= Mat Dryhurst =

British artist

- Born: 1984 (age 41–42); Birmingham, England
- Genres: Electronic; Experimental

Mat Dryhurst is a British artist, musician, and technological researcher based in Berlin, Germany. Dryhurst often works on interdisciplinary audiovisual projects in collaboration with Holly Herndon. The duo is known for their contributions to music and art, in which they explore the creative potential and ethics of creating content using technologies, such as AI, Web 3.0, and blockchain. Dryhurst and Herndon have been listed among Art Review's Power 100 in 2021 and 2022.

== Career ==
=== Advocacy for a decentralized internet ===
As an early adopter and practitioner of emerging blockchain technology including NFTs and social tokens, Dryhurst's work envisions cultural production within a decentralized internet. He exemplifies how artists and musicians can use technology to reclaim and direct how their work is displayed and contextualized when it is presented online.

In 2015, Dryhurst launched Saga, which is an embeddable self-hosting and publishing framework that lets content creators claim ownership in every space where their work is embedded online. Saga enables creatives to choose how their work will look when displayed on different websites where it is hosted or displayed.

Dryhurst envisions online culture through a lens similar to how independent record labels and DIY culture helped make the music industry more equitable and accessible. He notes that: “I'm bored of handing control of my work to centralized platforms that have no interest in representing the community of artists I identify with. An independent music industry was built by artists, for artists decades ago, and I think that we need to devise an equivalent infrastructure for online media. That doesn't mean SoundCloud with a different name and font, but an entirely different logic that is as nuanced and distinguished as the independent communities that use it.”

=== Collaborations with Holly Herndon ===
Dryhurst has collaborated on music, visual art, and tech-based projects with Holly Herndon since 2013. One of their first collaborative projects was designing sound for Sonic Movement, a research project operated by the Swedish company Semcon. Responding to the need for pedestrian safety due to the silent nature of electric cars, the duo developed a system that transformed an electric vehicle into a musical instrument that sang and collaborated with its environment and crafted warning sounds alerting pedestrians of the vehicle's presence. Their work premiered as an installation during Frankfurt Motorshow 2013.

In 2015, Dryhurst and Herndon released an eleven minute long track called Recruit, which they made for British menswear line Cottweiler. The artwork merges outdoor soundscapes alongside Herndon's treated vocal samples.

Dryhurst co-produced Herndon's albums Platform (2015) and Proto (2019) and joined her on tour as the supporting act for Radiohead in May 2016. Platform addresses themes of internet decentralization by actively exploring the concept of decentralized autonomous organizations (DAOs), which Dryhurst explains as “a native way to create agreements and trust amongst people who you've not met or who might be pseudonymous”. Platform was created through the Internet in collaboration between Dryhurst and Herndon and participants from all over the world.

=== Spawn and Holly+ ===
Since 2019, Dryhurst and Herndon have been making music using their own AI generators, which they named Spawn and Holly+. They have called Spawn their “AI baby,” while Holly+ is referred to as Herndon's “deepfake twin”. In 2021, a real time version of Holly+ premiered at Sonar Festival in Barcelona, Spain with Maria Arnal and Tarta Relena. Holly+ was also presented at TED2022: A New Era in April 2022 with Pher. Dryhurst and Herndon won the 2022 Ars Electronica STARTS prize for digital art for Holly+.

Spawn was developed during the making of Proto by Dryhurst, Herndon, and Jules LaPlace. It is an artificial neural network that can be trained to recognize and replicate distinct human voices. Dryhurst and Herndon taught Spawn to create original music by feeding it audio files, mainly featuring Herndon's own singing voice. Spawn was also trained to learn vocal ranges by listening to the voices of others. During the making of Proto, they held “training ceremonies” which are live call and response singing performances where Dryhurst, Herndon, and other enlisted participants train Spawn by singing to it. Once Spawn develops a framework for a particular vocal timbre, it is able to improvise and compose music on its own. One of the first sounds that Spawn produced became the foundation of the first track on Proto, titled “Birth”.

In 2021, Dryhurst and Herndon developed Holly+, a music AI generator that lets the public upload polyphonic tracks that are then performed by a deepfaked version of Herndon's voice. In 2022, they released a cover version of Dolly Parton's “Jolene,” using Holly+. A modified score of the original song composed of new tonal harmonies was fed to Holly+ and then generated in Herndon's voice. Every distinct vocal sound, including the deep breathes, usually taken by a performer before embarking on a harmony, was AI generated. Musician Ryan Norris accompanies Holly+ on guitar.

=== Interdependence ===
On April 30, 2020, Dryhurst and Herndon debuted their podcast, Interdependence. Broadcasting from their studio in Berlin, they host conversations with individuals who are working at the forefront of integrating arts and technology. Podcast guests have included artists James Bridle, Simon Denny, Harm van den Dorpel, and Emad Mostaque who is the founder of AI deep learning platform Stable Diffusion.

=== Spawning ===
In September 2022, Dryhurst and Herndon began collaborating with Jordan Meyer and Patrick Hoepner to develop an organization called Spawning. The name comes from the reproductive process that AI uses to create an infinite number of new works from its training data. It is intended to help distinguish this process from more familiar concepts like sampling. Spawning allows artists to consciously opt in or out of the datasets that AI art generators use to train and create compositions. They set up a website called haveibeentrained.com, where artists can search the approximately 5.8 billion images in the Laion-5b dataset used to train popular AI art models Stable Diffusion and Midjourney. If an artist finds out that their work is being hosted within a dataset, Spawning can help them declare whether they want to continue or terminate the use of their imagery for AI training. Dryhurst believes that “more will ultimately opt in than out, but first we have to establish a common respect”. In March 2023, Spawning, partnering with stock footage company Shutterstock and portfolio platform Artstation, announced that 80 million artworks have been opted out of Stable Diffusion version 3.0 to honor artists’ claims. Spawning's approach has been cited as being instructive towards guiding the European Union’s policy on text and data mining.

In 2023, Spawning launched Source.plus, "a tool to search and curate image collections into individually tailored training datasets."

== Exhibitions and visual art projects ==
In 2015, Dryhurst and Herndon presented their first fine art exhibition at Hamburg's Kunstverein space. The project was commissioned by ZKM Center for Art and Media’s Sound Dome. The exhibition, titled Everywhere and Nowhere, featured a combination of a 23.2-channel sound installation and related video works, as well as live performances by dancer and choreographer Jone San Martin, Jiu Jitsu fighter Sam Forsythe, and artist Brian Rogers. The performances are guided by whispered narration by Czech artists Marek Luzny and Lukas Hofmann. Inspiration for Everywhere and Nowhere came from a performance by Dryhurst and Herndon at Creepy Teepee, an anti-fascist music festival in the Czech forest.

== Teaching ==
Dryhurst has been a lecturer at the NYU Clive Davis Institute of Recorded Music, Strelka Institute, and the European Graduate School.
