= Swisher =

Swisher may mean:

== People ==
- Swisher (surname), a list of people

== Places in the United States ==
- Swisher, Iowa, a city
- Swisher County, Texas
- Swisher Gymnasium, Jacksonville, Florida

== In business ==
- Swisher Hygiene Inc., a provider of cleaning and sanitizing products and services
- Swisher (company), the world's largest cigar company by number sold

== Other uses ==
- Swisher (album), released in 2013 by the electronic duo Blondes
- "Swishers", a 2021 song by Sabina Ddumba

== See also ==
- Swish (disambiguation)
