= Angel Tears in Sunlight =

Studio album by Pauline Anna Strom
- Released: February 19, 2021
- Genre: Electronic; ambient
- Length: 45:45
- Label: RVNG Intl.

Pauline Anna Strom chronology
Trans-Millenia Music (2017)	Angel Tears in Sunlight (2021)	Echoes, Spaces, Lines (2023)

Angel Tears in Sunlight is the final studio album by American composer Pauline Anna Strom. It was released posthumously on February 19, 2021, through RVNG Intl. It received universal acclaim from critics.

== Background ==
Pauline Anna Strom was an American composer. She grew up in Louisiana and Kentucky before moving to the Bay Area. She released her debut studio album, Trans-Millenia Consort, in 1982, and continued to release music throughout the 1980s, often under the pseudonym Trans-Millenia Consort. She then stopped releasing music and lived in the San Francisco apartment alongside her pet iguanas Little Solstice and Ms Huff. Trans-Millenia Music, an anthology of her compositions from the 1980s, was released in 2017 through RVNG Intl.

Angel Tears in Sunlight is Strom's first studio album in over 30 years. It was created in the San Francisco apartment where she lived. She died on December 13, 2020, at the age of 74. The album was released posthumously on February 19, 2021, through RVNG Intl. A portion of proceeds from the sales of the album goes to the International Iguana Foundation. Music videos were released for the tracks "Marking Time" and "Equatorial Sunrise".

== Critical reception ==
Professional ratings
Aggregate scores
Source	Rating
Metacritic	87/100
Review scores
Source	Rating
AllMusic	4/5 stars
Beats Per Minute	75%
Crack	9/10
The Guardian	4/5 stars
Loud and Quiet	8/10
Mojo	4/5 stars
MusicOMH	4.5/5 stars
Pitchfork	7.9/10
Spectrum Culture	68%
Uncut	9/10

According to the review aggregator Metacritic, Angel Tears in Sunlight received "universal acclaim" based on a weighted average score of 87 out of 100 from 10 critic scores.

Kez Cochrane of Crack wrote, "A transcendent parting gift to the universe, Angel Tears in Sunlight is a timeless addition to Strom's canonical legacy." Andy Beta of Pitchfork stated, "The lightest and most playful of Strom's recorded work, it signals new vistas ahead, ones that sadly will now have to be explored by others." Robert Davidson of Loud and Quiet called the album "a mesmerising final tour of a fascinating mind and a fitting farewell to truly a one-of-a-kind visionary."

=== Accolades ===
Year-end lists for Angel Tears in Sunlight
Publication	List	Rank	Ref.
AllMusic	Favorite Electronic Albums	—	
Beats Per Minute	BPM's Favorite Ambient of 2021	—	
Crack	The Top 50 Albums of 2021	36	
NPR	The Best Electronic Music of 2021	—	
The Vinyl Factory	Our 50 Favourite Albums of 2021	35	
The Wire	Releases of the Year (2021 Rewind)	37	

== Track listing ==
All tracks are written by Pauline Anna Strom.

Angel Tears in Sunlight track listing
No.	Title	Length
1.	"Tropical Convergence"	2:41
2.	"Marking Time"	4:30
3.	"I Still Hope"	2:28
4.	"Temple Gardens at Midnight"	4:25
5.	"The Pulsation"	5:47
6.	"The Eighteen Beautiful Memories"	4:03
7.	"Equatorial Sunrise"	6:10
8.	"Small Reptiles on the Forest Floor"	5:36
9.	"Tropical Rainforest"	5:45
10.	"Words in Motion" (bonus track)	4:08
Total length:		45:45

== Personnel ==
Credits adapted from liner notes.

- Pauline Anna Strom – recording
- John Also Bennett – editing
- Jeremy Harris – mixing
- Jessica Thompson – mastering
- Aubrey Trinnaman – photography (Pauline's hand)
- John Jennings – photography (Little Solstice and Ms Huff)
- Will Work for Good – design
