= A Danger to Ourselves =

Studio album by Lucrecia Dalt
- Released: 5 September 2025
- Length: 50:16
- Label: RVNG
- Producer: Lucrecia Dalt; David Sylvian

Lucrecia Dalt chronology
¡Ay! (2022)	A Danger to Ourselves (2025)

Singles from A Danger to Ourselves
- 1. "Cosa Rara" Released: 28 January 2025; 2. "Divina" Released: 27 May 2025

A Danger to Ourselves is the seventh studio album by Colombian experimental musician Lucrecia Dalt. It was released on 5 September 2025, via RVNG Intl. in LP, CD and digital formats.

A Danger to Ourselves was co-produced by Dalt and David Sylvian. "Cosa Rara" was released as the first single on 28 January 2025. "Divina" followed as the second single on 27 May 2025, alongside a music video directed by Tony Lowe.

== Reception ==
Professional ratings
Aggregate scores
Source	Rating
Metacritic	84/100
Review scores
Source	Rating
AllMusic	3.5/5 stars
Clash	8/10
The Skinny	5/5 stars

According to the review aggregator Metacritic, A Danger to Ourselves received "universal acclaim" based on a weighted average score of 84 out of 100 from 9 critic scores.

The album received a five-star rating from The Skinny, whose reviewer Patrick Gamble referred it as "a cinematic exploration of the self that reveals the human psyche as a strange and uncanny landscape."

Igor Bannikov of Clash described the album as "something strange and eerie, yet surprisingly close to a pop album, with weirdly catchy melodies that tempt you to either dance or hide under the bed, the very thing music critics with their radars on may be looking for," giving it a rating of eight out of ten.

AllMusic's Paul Simpson called the album "a unique sonic environment that actually becomes stranger as one spends more time inside of it."

=== Accolades ===
Year-end lists for A Danger to Ourselves
Publication	List	Rank	Ref.
Crack	The Top 50 Albums of 2025	36	
DJ Mag	DJ Mag's Top Albums of 2025	—	
No Ripcord	The Best Albums of 2025	36	
Pitchfork	The 50 Best Albums of 2025	34	

== Track listing ==
All lyrics are written by Lucrecia Dalt, except "Cosa Rara" (written with David Sylvian) and "The Common Reader" (written with Juana Molina); all music is composed by Dalt and Alex Lázaro.

A Danger to Ourselves track listing
No.	Title	Length
1.	"Cosa Rara" (featuring David Sylvian)	3:48
2.	"Amorcito Caradura"	1:06
3.	"No Death No Danger"	3:10
4.	"Caes" (featuring Camille Mandoki)	3:49
5.	"Agüita Con Sal"	2:23
6.	"Hasta El Final"	4:17
7.	"Divina"	4:13
8.	"Acéphale"	2:44
9.	"Mala Sangre"	4:12
10.	"The Common Reader" (featuring Juana Molina)	2:33
11.	"Stelliformia"	5:44
12.	"El Exceso Según Cs"	2:18
13.	"Covenstead Blues"	3:46
14.	"Caes (Nick León Dub)" (featuring Camille Mandoki)	3:13
Total length:		50:16

== Personnel ==
Credits adapted from Bandcamp and Tidal.

- Lucrecia Dalt – vocals, instrumentation, production, instrument recording, vocal recording (all tracks); string arrangements (track 6)
- David Sylvian – production, mixing, claps, finger snaps (all tracks); vocals, feedback guitar, vocal recording (1); electric guitar solo (13), art direction
- Heba Kadry – mastering
- Josh Bonati – vinyl lacquer cut
- Alex Lázaro – percussion, claps, finger snaps (all tracks); backing vocals, howls (7); electric guitar (11)
- Cyrus Campbell – electric bass, contrabass (1–8, 10–14)
- Eliana Joy – backing vocals (2, 3, 13), string arrangements (6)
- Chris Jonas – soprano saxophone, tenor saxophone (5)
- Carla Kountoupes – violin (6, 7)
- Karina Wilson – violin (6, 7)
- Amanda Laborete – cello (6)
- Marc Whitmore – string recording (6)
- William Fuller – electric bass (9)
- Juana Molina – vocals, vocal recording (10)
- Camille Mandoki – vocals, vocal recording (14)
- Yuka Fujii – cover photo
- Louie Perea – photo retouching
- Will Work for Good – design
