= Chorus (EP) =

EP by Holly Herndon
- Released: January 21, 2014
- Length: 12:23
- Label: RVNG Intl.

Holly Herndon chronology
Movement (2012)	Chorus (2014)	Platform (2015)

Chorus is an EP by American composer and record producer Holly Herndon. It was released on January 21, 2014, through RVNG Intl. It received generally favorable reviews from critics.

== Background ==
Holly Herndon is an American composer and record producer. Chorus is a follow-up EP to her debut studio album, Movement (2012). It contains two tracks: "Chorus" and "Solo Voice". The EP was released on January 21, 2014, through RVNG Intl., as a limited edition 12-inch vinyl and as a digital download.

A music video was released for the title track "Chorus". Akihiko Taniguchi directed the video. It features 3D-rendered images of various home environments.

"Chorus" would later appear on Herndon's second studio album, Platform (2015).

== Critical reception ==
Professional ratings
Aggregate scores
Source	Rating
Metacritic	74/100
Review scores
Source	Rating
Fact	4/5 stars
Pitchfork	8.0/10
Resident Advisor	4/5
XLR8R	7/10

According to the review aggregator Metacritic, Chorus received "generally favorable reviews" based on a weighted average score of 74 out of 100 from 4 critic scores.

Maya Kalev of Fact stated, "Chorus is informed by the conviction that the laptop is a performative instrument, and the political, aesthetic and practical implications of that premise." Mark Richardson of Pitchfork commented that "The basic elements of 'Chorus' and 'Solo Voice' have much in common, but the difference in how they work is significant, which speaks to Herndon's expansive range as a composer." Steve Kerr of XLR8R stated, "Experiments shouldn't necessarily have to reflect anything." He added, "Even if it doesn't land any emotional blows, the record still has its dynamism to fall back upon."

=== Accolades ===
Year-end lists for "Chorus"
Publication	List	Rank	Ref.
Pitchfork	The 100 Best Tracks of 2014	74	
The Quietus	Quietus Tracks of the Year 2014	1	
Resident Advisor	Top 50 Tracks of 2014	42	

== Track listing ==
All tracks are written by Holly Herndon.

Chorus track listing
No.	Title	Length
1.	"Chorus"	5:57
2.	"Solo Voice"	6:26
Total length:		12:23

== Personnel ==
Credits adapted from liner notes.

- Holly Herndon – custom software, recording
- Mat Dryhurst – custom software
- Mark Pistel – mixing
- Rashad Becker – mastering
- Will Work for Good – graphic design
