= Movement (Holly Herndon album) =

Studio album by Holly Herndon
- Released: 13 November 2012
- Genre: Experimental; techno
- Length: 35:04
- Label: RVNG Intl.
- Producer: Holly Herndon

Holly Herndon chronology
Car (2011)	Movement (2012)	Chorus (2014)

Movement is the first studio album by American electronic musician Holly Herndon, released by RVNG Intl. on 12 November 2012. A music video for the album's title track was uploaded to the RVNG Intl. YouTube account on 29 November 2012.

== Critical reception ==
Professional ratings
Aggregate scores
Source	Rating
Metacritic	81/100
Review scores
Source	Rating
Beats Per Minute	79%
Consequence of Sound	4/5 stars
Fact	3/5 stars
Pitchfork	8.1/10
PopMatters	8/10
Resident Advisor	3/5
Tiny Mix Tapes	4/5 stars
Uncut	8/10
XLR8R	7/10

According to the review aggregator Metacritic, Movement received "universal acclaim" based on a weighted average score of 81 out of 100 from 11 critic scores.

=== Accolades ===
Year-end lists for Movement
Publication	List	Rank	Ref.
The Quietus	The Quietus Albums of the Year 2012	33	
Tiny Mix Tapes	Favorite 50 Albums of 2012	13	

== Track listing ==
All tracks are written by Holly Herndon.

Movement track listing
No.	Title	Length
1.	"Terminal"	8:15
2.	"Fade"	6:29
3.	"Breath"	5:59
4.	"Control And"	2:00
5.	"Movement"	4:53
6.	"Interlude"	1:04
7.	"Dilato"	6:24
Total length:		35:04

== Personnel ==
Credits adapted from AllMusic.

- Holly Herndon – production, engineering
- Bruce Rameker – vocals
- Matthew Dryhurst – editing
- Mark Pistel – mixing
- Scott Arford – mixing
- Rashad Becker – mastering
- Kevin O'Neill – design
- Randy Yau – photography
