= Anticlines (album) =

Studio album by Lucrecia Dalt
- Released: 4 May 2018
- Length: 36:23
- Label: RVNG Intl.

Lucrecia Dalt chronology
Ou (2015)	Anticlines (2018)	No Era Sólida (2020)

Anticlines is a solo studio album by Lucrecia Dalt, a Colombian musician based in Berlin. It was released on 4 May 2018 through RVNG Intl. It received universal acclaim from critics.

== Background ==
Lucrecia Dalt created Anticlines primarily using Nord Modular, Moogerfooger MuRF, and her voice. She wrote the lyrics with Henry Anderson. The album's title refers to a type of geological formation. Music videos were released for "Tar" and "Edge".

== Critical reception ==
Professional ratings
Aggregate scores
Source	Rating
Metacritic	83/100
Review scores
Source	Rating
Pitchfork	8.0/10
PopMatters	8/10
Resident Advisor	4.1/5
Tiny Mix Tapes	3.5/5 stars
XLR8R	8.5/10

According to the review aggregator Metacritic, Anticlines received "universal acclaim" based on a weighted average score of 83 out of 100 from 7 critic scores.

Philip Sherburne of Pitchfork stated, "what makes this a truly special record is its vocal dimension." He added, "A world away from her singing style on previous albums, Dalt's performance here combines captivating spoken-word passages with subtle vocal processing that sounds like the product of a chromed larynx." Daniel Cole of XLR8R stated, "deeply framed messages are tied together with abstract jagged music, rigid sound design and haunting, poetic vocals, to create a richly layered record." Danijela Bočev of The Quietus commented that "This is an immersive listen, full of eerie familiarity and suspended body horror; a quasi-mystical sense of oneness gives Anticlines cohesion and a sense of spiritual comfort, and somehow reminds one of the vast indifferent universe as we descend into environmental disaster."

=== Accolades ===
Year-end lists for Anticlines
Publication	List	Rank	Ref.
The Quietus	Quietus Albums of the Year 2018	76	
Resident Advisor	2018's Best Albums	—	

== Track listing ==
All lyrics are written by Lucrecia Dalt and Henry Anderson; all music is composed by Lucrecia Dalt.

Anticlines track listing
No.	Title	Length
1.	"Edge"	3:45
2.	"Altra"	1:30
3.	"Tar"	4:40
4.	"Atmospheres Touch"	3:29
5.	"Errors of Skin"	3:39
6.	"Analogue Mountains"	2:14
7.	"Axis Excess"	2:33
8.	"Indifferent Universe"	1:42
9.	"Concentric Nothings"	1:54
10.	"Helio Tanz"	1:44
11.	"Glass Brain"	3:09
12.	"Liminalidad"	2:33
13.	"Eclipsed Subject"	1:20
14.	"Antiform"	2:11
Total length:		36:23

Expanded edition bonus track
No.	Title	Length
15.	"Shergotite Rain"	3:01
Total length:		39:24

== Personnel ==
Credits adapted from liner notes.

- Lucrecia Dalt – recording, mixing
- Rashad Becker – mastering
- WWFG – design
- Regina de Miguel – photography
