= Lex (album) =

EP / soundtrack album by Visible Cloaks
- Released: December 8, 2017
- Genre: Ambient; experimental; electroacoustic
- Length: 27:13; 39:23 (Japan CD release)
- Label: RVNG Intl.
- Producer: Ryan Carlile; Spencer Doran

Visible Cloaks chronology
Reassemblage (2017)	Lex (2017)	Paradessence (2026)

Lex is a mini-album and partial soundtrack by Portland, Oregon duo Visible Cloaks, consisting of Spencer Doran and Ryan Carlile. Continuing the experimental electronic music stylings and East and West relationship ideas of their previous work Reassemblage (2017), the album takes place in a future utopian world with aliens talking in a hybrid of several languages to the point of speaking a "non-language." The speech sounds on the album were made by Doran feeding dialects and accents to the language translation program Infovox Voice Manager.

The first five tracks of Lex soundtrack a short film the duo and artist Brenna Murphy did titled Permutate Lex (2017), and the closing track "World," according to RVNG Intl.'s press release, is a "fixed" version of a piece the duo and Murphy previously originally did for an unspecified art installation. The film was released by Kabinett on October 12, 2017, the album issued by RVNG Intl. on December 8 to favorable reviews from music writers.

== Production ==
The making of Lex began with Spencer Doran and his friend Brenna Murphy, who does artwork and videos for Visible Cloaks' music, being "commissioned" to produce a fifteen-minute short film; he said this in an interview with The Quietus, though he did not specify who commissioned the two to make the film. Doran conceived the idea of having a speech synthesizer to serve as dialogue for the film. Doran produced the speeches by having the language translation program Infovox Voice Manager speak various dialects and accents into other languages. Visible Cloaks and Murphy titled the short film Permutate Lex, and its audio also served as the first five tracks for a Visible Cloaks mini-album titled Lex. The word "Lex" in both titles derived from the speeches being spoken in a "lexical permutation."

== Composition and concept ==
Lex continues the experimental musical style, 1980s Japanese electronic music influences, and East and West relationship concept of Visible Cloaks' previous album Reassemblage (2017). According to RVNG Intl.'s press releases, Lex takes place in a future utopia, "a limitless, delicate space developed by fluid musical techniques and subconscious voices," with "mysteries" told via an "unknown but imaginable melodic language." Doran stated that the album is trying to present a future vision of the world that can't be determined currently, and thus it seems "only surreal and inscrutable" to most people. Also like Reassemblage, Lex takes sounds of metallophones, woodwinds, and synthesizers and makes the "source" of the instruments less identifiable, "adding a 21st-century digital-versus-acoustic complexity to the mix," writer Chal Raven stated.

The music is led by aliens trying to speak a hybrid of several languages but end up speaking a "non-language" as a result. Doran stated the speeches were meant to be a commentary on inaccurate translations that most translation applications makes. The speeches are the most commonplace on Lex's first four tracks, which Raven labeled as more "fragmented, unsettled, and inscrutable" than Reassemblage. The record becomes almost entirely ambient by the title track, however, with only bits of the alien voices before completing disappearing on its 14-minute closer "World."

Returning to the "dreamy" tones of Reassemblage, "World" is a "fixed" version of a "generative composition" that Doran made for an installation he worked on with artist Brenna Murphy; that's according to the press release, though it didn't specify which installation. While the original version of the composition consists of erratic MIDI notes and uses of low-frequency oscillation, the version that appears on Lex is about "a more conclusive view" of the "deepening, patient intimations" the future world of Lex will likely bring. Resident Advisor described "World" as more "immersive" than the album's more "blur"ry previous tracks: "Watery sounds slosh around, airy tones drift at the periphery and chords ripple outwards."

== Release and reception ==
Professional ratings
Review scores
Source	Rating
The 405	7/10
Pitchfork	7.1/10
Resident Advisor	3.8/5
The Skinny	4/5 stars

On October 12, 2017, the company Kabinett released Permutate Lex on its website. RVNG Intl. released the album Lex on digital and vinyl formats on December 8, 2017, a release date for the album's Japan-only CD release yet to be announced. The album was critically well-received upon its distribution. As Raven wrote in his review for Pitchfork, "though less memorable than its predecessor, Lex succeeds when it is heard as intended: as a conceptual companion to Reassemblage’s opaque experimentation." The 405 praised the album as "well-mannered, fun experimentalism with a winning spirit," and "if it doesn't break any tonal boundaries, it firmly establishes its composers' place at least in sight of the bleeding edge. And it opens the door to all manner of discoveries." The Skinny stated it was successful in presenting its concept, reasoning that it sounds "consistently otherworldly, but still retain[s] enough humanity to make it effective."

== Track listing ==
Derived from the RVNG Intl. website.

Lex – Standard version
No.	Title	Length
1.	"Wheel"	3:35
2.	"Frame"	2:36
3.	"Transient"	2:15
4.	"Keys"	2:23
5.	"Lex"	2:06
6.	"World"	14:18
Total length:		27:13

Lex – CD exclusive bonus track
No.	Title	Length
7.	"Permutate Lex"	12:10
Total length:		39:23

== Personnel ==
Derived from the liner notes of Lex.

- Written, recorded, and produced by Ryan Carlile and Spencer Doran
- Mixed by Doran at The Garden Studio in Portland, Oregon
- Mastered by Rashad Becker at Dubplates & Mastering in Portland, Oregon
- Artwork by Brenna Murphy

== Release history ==
Region	Date	Format(s)	Label
Worldwide	December 8, 2017	Digital download; vinyl	RVNG Intl.
Japan	TBA	CD	RVNG Intl.
