= ¡Ay! =

Studio album by Lucrecia Dalt
- Released: 14 October 2022
- Length: 34:27
- Label: RVNG Intl.

Lucrecia Dalt chronology
No Era Sólida (2020)	¡Ay! (2022)	A Danger to Ourselves (2025)

¡Ay! is a studio album by Lucrecia Dalt, a Colombian musician based in Berlin. It was released on 14 October 2022 through RVNG Intl. It received universal acclaim from critics.

== Background ==
¡Ay! is Lucrecia Dalt's first solo studio album since No Era Sólida (2020). In between, she collaborated with Aaron Dilloway on Lucy & Aaron and composed the scores for The Seed and The Baby. ¡Ay! tells the story of an alien named Preta who visits the planet Earth. On the album, Dalt sings the lyrics in Spanish. The album's title translates to "Oh!" in English. Music videos were released for the songs "No Tiempo", "Atemporal", "Dicen", and "Enviada".

== Critical reception ==
Professional ratings
Aggregate scores
Source	Rating
Metacritic	83/100
Review scores
Source	Rating
AllMusic	3.5/5 stars
Mojo	4/5 stars
Pitchfork	8.6/10
PopMatters	8/10
Uncut	8/10

According to the review aggregator Metacritic, ¡Ay! received "universal acclaim" based on a weighted average score of 83 out of 100 from 6 critic scores.

Chris Richards of The Washington Post described the album as "a richly percussive, luxuriously spacious recording, with Dalt singing tenderly over various bolero-shaped rhythms, each song unspooling patiently, inviting you to notice its details." Paul Simpson of AllMusic stated, "Much heavier on acoustic instrumentation than Dalt's previous albums, the record has a bit of a space-age exotica feel, giving the impression of an extraterrestrial's first encounters with Latin American music." He added, "With ¡Ay!, Dalt succeeds at constructing and exploring an elaborate sound world that resembles a surreal reflection of her past." Bernie Brooks of The Quietus commented that "the real strength of Dalt's work on ¡Ay! lies not in its strangeness but in how deftly it navigates and defines its relationship with the past, while doing something novel in the present, and charting out new paths forward into the future."

=== Accolades ===
Year-end lists for ¡Ay!
Publication	List	Rank	Ref.
Crack	The Top 50 Albums of 2022	8	
DJ Mag	DJ Mag's Top Albums of 2022	—	
The Fader	The 50 Best Albums of 2022	19	
NPR	The 50 Best Albums of 2022	29	
Pitchfork	The 50 Best Albums of 2022	8	
Rolling Stone	The 100 Best Albums of 2022	64	
The Wire	The Wire's Releases of the Year 2022	1	

== Track listing ==
All lyrics are written by Lucrecia Dalt and Miguel Prado; all music is composed by Lucrecia Dalt.

¡Ay! track listing
No.	Title	Length
1.	"No Tiempo"	3:35
2.	"El Galatzó"	3:32
3.	"Atemporal"	3:07
4.	"Dicen"	2:44
5.	"Contenida"	4:31
6.	"La Desmesura"	3:45
7.	"Gena"	4:29
8.	"Bochinche"	2:11
9.	"Enviada"	4:03
10.	"Epílogo"	2:28
Total length:		34:27

== Personnel ==
Credits adapted from liner notes.

- Lucrecia Dalt – arrangement, pre-mixing, album concept
- Miguel Prado – album concept
- Lina Allemano – trumpet
- Edith Steyer – clarinet, flute
- Nick Dunston – double bass
- Isabel Rößler – double bass (2)
- Alex Lázaro – percussion, backing vocals
- Camille Mandoki – backing vocals
- Alberto Lucendo – wind instruments recording, double bass (Nick Dunston) recording
- Eric Brewer – percussion recording
- Marta Salogni – mixing
- Sarah Register – mastering
- Anne Taegert – vinyl cut
- Will Work for Food – artwork, design
- Aina Climent – cover photography
- Regina de Miguel – limited edition cover artwork
