= Warmth (album) =

Studio album by Blondes
- Released: August 11, 2017
- Genre: Electronic
- Label: R&S

Blondes chronology
Persuasion (2015)	Warmth (2017)

Warmth is the third studio album by New York City-based electronic music group Blondes, released on R&S Records on August 11, 2017; they originally released records via RVNG Intl., but as the label moved their business model from issuing dance music to experimental music and re-releases of underground records, the duo moved to R&S to continue producing dance music.

Professional ratings
Aggregate scores
Source	Rating
Album of the Year	73/100
AnyDecentMusic?	7.1/10
Metacritic	76/100
Review scores
Source	Rating
The A.V. Club	B
Crack Magazine	7/10
DJ Mag	8/10
Drowned in Sound	6/10
Exclaim!	7/10
The Line of Best Fit	7.5/10
Pitchfork	7.3/10
Resident Advisor	3.7/5
The Skinny	4/5 stars
Tiny Mix Tapes	4/5 marks
