= No Era Sólida =

Studio album by Lucrecia Dalt
- Released: 11 September 2020
- Studio: Berlin, Germany; INA GRM (Paris, France); Pioneer Works (Brooklyn, New York, United States)
- Length: 40:05
- Label: RVNG Intl.

Lucrecia Dalt chronology
Anticlines (2018)	No Era Sólida (2020)	¡Ay! (2022)

No Era Sólida is a solo studio album by Lucrecia Dalt, a Colombian musician based in Berlin. It was released on 11 September 2020 through RVNG Intl. It received universal acclaim from critics.

== Background ==
No Era Sólida is Lucrecia Dalt's first solo studio album since Anticlines (2018). She drew inspiration from J. G. Ballard's short story "Venus Smiles", as well as Clarice Lispector's novel A Breath of Life. The album centers around a fictional character named Lia. The album was entirely written, recorded, and mixed by Dalt herself. She finished making the album before the COVID-19 pandemic. The album's title is Spanish for "I was not solid", "she was not solid", or "it was not solid".

A portion of the proceeds from the sales of the album goes to Tierra Digna, an organization that "works to defend Colombian communities affected by economic policies that impact human rights and the environment."

== Critical reception ==
Professional ratings
Aggregate scores
Source	Rating
Metacritic	81/100
Review scores
Source	Rating
Pitchfork	7.9/10

According to the review aggregator Metacritic, No Era Sólida received "universal acclaim" based on a weighted average score of 81 out of 100 from 5 critic scores.

Claire Lobenfeld of Bandcamp Daily described the album as "a record of unraveling and reformation." She added, "Its songs are intellectual and visceral at the same time." Jonathan Williger of Pitchfork stated, "It shows rather than tells, guiding you through its prickly, unstable moods with a mystical sort of grace." Hannah Pezzack of The Quietus commented that the album "travels to cavernous spaces, occupying an ethereal landscape that is deep inside an unknowable earth." She added, "Its final title track crystallises with Dalt singing in Spanish, moving out of her made-up language, the dissolution finally coming into sharp focus."

Pitchfork included the album's opening song "Disuelta" in its list of "The 22 Best Songs by Latinx Artists in 2020".

=== Accolades ===
Year-end lists for No Era Sólida
Publication	List	Rank	Ref.
The Quietus	Quietus Albums of the Year 2020	84	

== Track listing ==
All tracks are written by Lucrecia Dalt.

No Era Sólida track listing
No.	Title	Length
1.	"Disuelta"	2:57
2.	"Seca"	2:18
3.	"Coatlicue S."	3:24
4.	"Ser Boca"	3:55
5.	"Espesa"	2:22
6.	"Di"	4:23
7.	"Suprema"	2:06
8.	"Revuelta"	4:27
9.	"Endiendo"	4:17
10.	"No Era Sólida"	9:52
Total length:		40:05

== Personnel ==
Credits adapted from liner notes.

- Lucrecia Dalt – recording, mixing
- Rashad Becker – mastering
- Will Work for Good – design
