= Syndrome Syndrome =

Studio album by Gardland
- Released: 29 October 2013
- Recorded: 2013
- Studio: Gardland's bedroom, Marrickville^{[a]}
- Genre: Techno; house; ambient; sound art
- Length: 53:19; 64:17 (CD and digital)
- Label: RVNG Intl.
- Producer: Gardland

Gardland chronology
EP (2013)	Syndrome Syndrome (2013)	Improvisations (2014)

Singles from Syndrome Syndrome
- 1. "Syndrome Syndrome" Released: 17 September 2013; 2. "Magicville" Released: 10 October 2013

Syndrome Syndrome is the debut studio album by Australian techno duo Gardland, consisting of Alex Murray and Mark Smith. It was released by the label RVNG Intl. on 29 October 2013. The album was produced by Gardland based on a deal RVNG Intl. leader Matt Werth made with the duo after he listened to a performance they did on the radio. Recorded in Marrickville^{[a]} over three weeks of improvisational sessions, Syndrome Syndrome is very harsh in tone and has an open-ended style that's unconventional to most electronic music genres. In critical reviews, Syndrome Syndrome was praised for its unique arrangement and sound methods while also being panned for its long length.

== Production ==
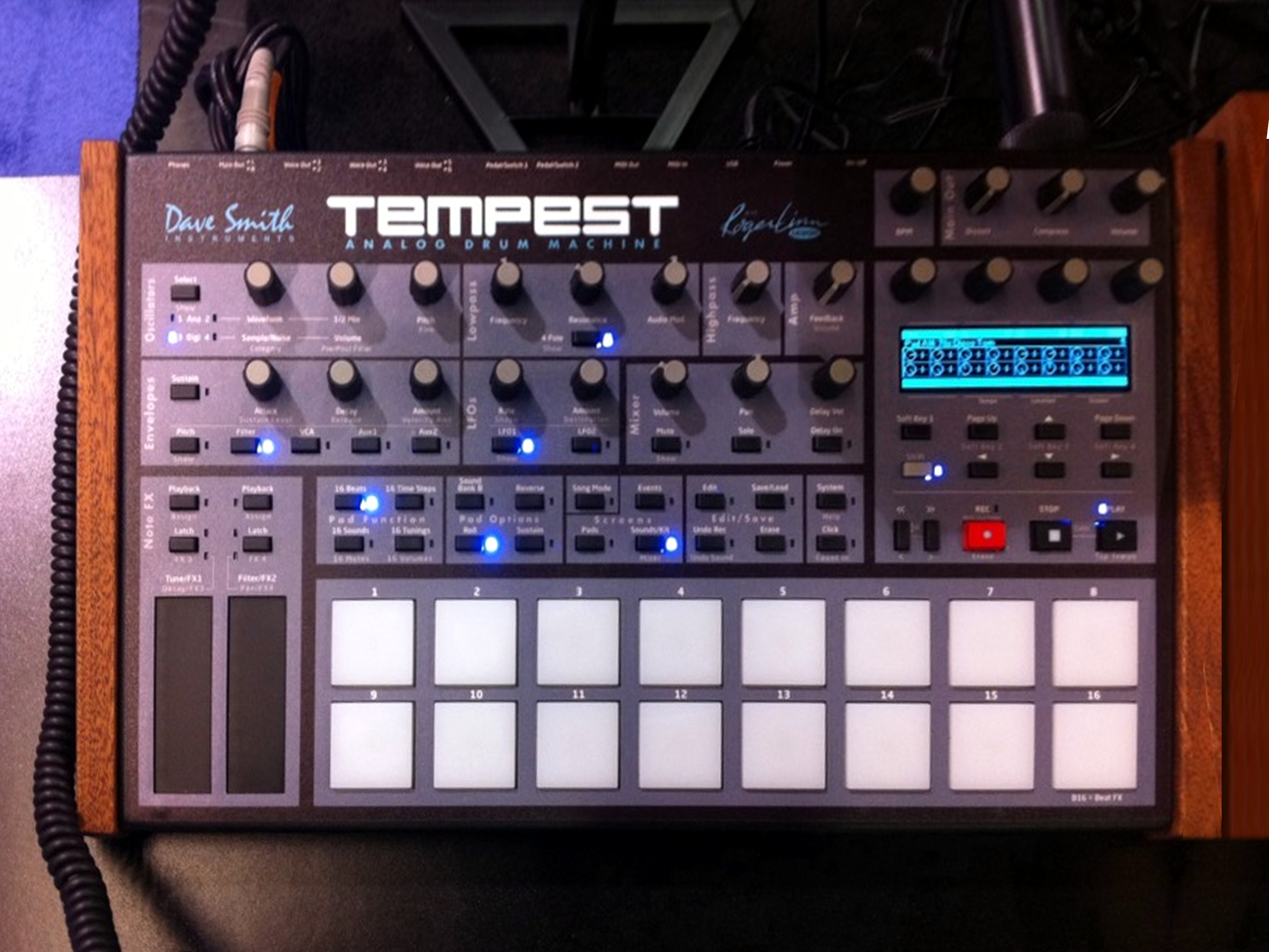
Gardland primarily used a Dave Smith Tempest for making Syndrome Syndrome.

“We decided to get rid of the computer and improvise. We had a deadline. We had to make a record for a broadly scoped record label [RVNG Intl.] on the other side of the world. So we just locked ourselves in a bedroom and smashed out the best music we possibly could.”

— Gardland on making Syndrome Syndrome

RVNG Intl. leader Matt Werth noticed Gardland in late 2012 when the duo were performing with Teengirl Fantasy. Teengirl Fantasy informed Werth about Gardland, and after listening to an improvisational set the duo performed on radio, he emailed them about signing them to RVNG Intl. for an album release. Gardland recorded Syndrome Syndrome in their Marrickville bedroom^{[a]} over the course of three weeks worth of 12-hour improvisational sessions while unemployed.

Gardland's initial plan for their first RVNG Intl. record was an extended play based on the radio set. Murray and Smith originally programmed sounds to be used for the EP on their Dave Smith Tempest drum machines. However, three weeks before they were due to submit it for RVNG Intl., someone stole Murray's drum machine and Smith lost his. This forced the duo to buy new Tempest machines and go into a "mad, yet fruitful, binge of writing" new tracks.

Gardland explained that starting over to make new content for the album actually helped them: "There was a period of trying to reclaim the sounds we lost - but when we realised that this was a waste of time and decided to focus on making totally new stuff, the material came out thick and fast." The result was a full-length album instead of an extended play as originally planned. About two weeks of the recording of Syndrome Syndrome was spent working on material after the drum machine incident. The LP's newer material makes up 80 percent of the album and is the record's "more exploratory and generally wacked out" material, while the content originally written on the duo's lost Tempest machines is the album's calmest tracks.

While the Tempests served as the foundation for Gardland producing the record, the JoMoX Xbase09 and MFB-522 were also used to record replications of sounds from the Roland TR-808 and TR-909 as well as slightly reduce the "experimental" instincts of the duo for a more "codified" sound palette. Murray explained, "Maybe it was a subliminal goal of ours, to create sounds that we hadn’t heard before and to be able to get that away from a purely experimental context and bring it into a club setting.”

== Composition ==
As the RVNG Intl. press release for Syndrome Syndrome states, the album follows an unconventional and "uneasy" techno style where beats enter and disappear at unexpected random moments, the "harmonic architecture forms cavernous canopies in place of metronomic melodies," and the structure "may or may not crumble on contact." This open-ended structure is more akin to RVNG Intl.'s FRKWYS series than the label's regular set of albums. Dummy critic Steph Kretowicz described the LP as exploring the "hidden" sound art stylings of electronic music, examples including the "swinging, manic rhythm and vicious clatter" of "One on None" and the sub bass textures on "Success in Circuit."

The music of Syndrome Syndrome is very harsh, which reflects the social environment and weather of where Gardland recorded the album. As The 405's Corao Malley analyzed, it contains a couple of tracks which are slightly darker of the album's overall tone, suggesting "hints of a different world creep[ing] in from time to time." Murray described making the LP as "searching exploration" in the places they were in at the time, and Kretowicz, while interviewing Murray for Dummy, described the album as having an "earthy feel" in its otherwise electronic sound. RVNG Intl. noted the use of human and machine-produced textures on songs like the title track, "Katarakt" and "Hell Flur," stating that they give the music a "paradoxical unity" and a "deranged power."

== Critical reception ==
Professional ratings
Aggregate scores
Source	Rating
Metacritic	73/100
Review scores
Source	Rating
The 405	8/10
Dummy	6/10
Fact	4/5
musicOMH	3.5/5 stars
Pitchfork	6.3/10
Resident Advisor	4/5
Uncut	3.5/5 stars
XLR8R	8/10

Resident Advisor stated Syndrome Syndrome has an "unpredictable, wandering spirit" that makes it worth listening to its otherwise "monochrome" sound. XLR8R highlighted the album's use of a false "illusion of forward movement" on tracks like "Magicville" and "Ode to Ode" and praised its use of improvisation with common electronic music formulas. Malley called the LP "powerful while rarely tipping over into outright ferocity, which makes its darkness all the more unnerving," also spotlighting its "purity of sound that disorients one moment and dazzles the next."

The more mixed reviews of Syndrome Syndrome mainly criticized the album's overly long length. Pitchfork writer Nick Neyland criticized Syndrome Syndrome for feeling simply like an experiment with undeveloped concepts rather than an actual album. He noted that some moments of the LP show a "stronger sense of design," but it was overall a "trying proposition" for listeners due to its overly long runtime and a lack of a "real sense of purpose." Selim Bulut of Dummy found Syndrome Syndrome not "that much fun to listen to end-to-end" for its lack of structural variety between tracks and summarized that it's "an album that demands a lot of your time with little reward."

== Track listing ==
Derived from the RVNG Intl. official website.

Syndrome Syndrome – Standard version
No.	Title	Length
1.	"Grrone"	2:12
2.	"Syndrome Syndrome"	4:41
3.	"Katarakt"	5:37
4.	"One In None"	4:34
5.	"Ode To Ode"	6:11
6.	"Trepan Heke"	4:24
7.	"Magicville"	4:33
8.	"Ride Wid Me"	5:59
9.	"Success In Circuit"	4:15
10.	"Nothing But Not Zero"	6:24
11.	"Hell Flur"	4:29
Total length:		53:19

Syndrome Syndrome – CD and digital exclusive bonus tracks
No.	Title	Length
12.	"Reak"	6:00
13.	"fMRI"	4:58
Total length:		64:17

== Release history ==
Region	Date	Format(s)	Label
Worldwide	29 October 2013	CD; digital download; vinyl	RVNG Intl.

== Notes ==
- a RVNG Intl.'s press release states Gardland recorded Syndrome Syndrome "during a psychedelic desert excursion far from their urban dwellings in Sydney, Australia." The duo placed a joke about the album being recorded in a desert in the press release because it was "a lot more sexy than ‘recorded in a bedroom in Marrickville, hell poor’."
