= Lucrecia Dalt =

Colombian-born musician

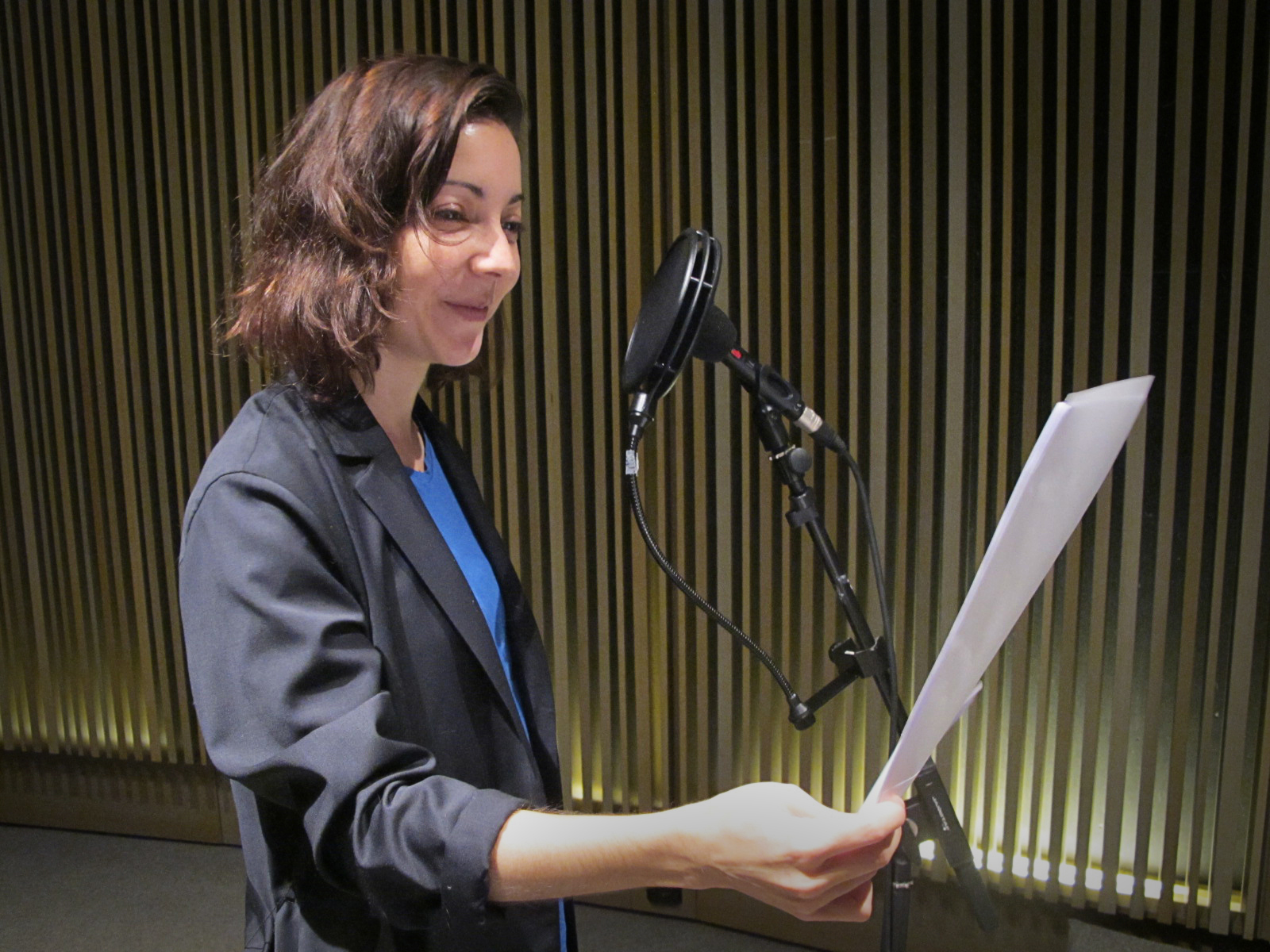

Background information
- Born: 20 December 1980 (age 45); Pereira, Colombia
- Genres: Avant-garde; experimental
- Occupations: Musician; composer
- Labels: RVNG Intl.; Care of Editions; Hanson; Other People; Invada
- Website: lucreciadalt.bandcamp.com

Lucrecia Dalt (born 20 December 1980) is a Colombian experimental musician who currently resides in New Mexico. While her earlier releases were rooted in electronic dance music, her work has evolved over time to become more overtly abstract and experimental.

== Biography ==
Dalt was born in Pereira, Colombia. She studied civil engineering and worked for two years in a geotechnical company in Medellín before deciding to pursue music.

Her first recordings were released by Colombian collective Series under the name Lucrecia. After meeting Gudrun Gut, she contributed four songs to the 4 Women No Cry compilation released on Monika Enterprise in 2008.

After moving to Europe, she released a series of recordings, including a release on Nicolás Jaar's Other People imprint and a series of collaborations with Aaron Dilloway. Among her more recent releases are the albums Anticlines (2018), No Era Sólida (2020), and ¡Ay! (2022), on RVNG Intl.

In 2022, Dalt announced her debut film score for The Seed, a sci-fi horror film directed by Sam Walker.

British music magazine The Wire named ¡Ay! record of the year 2022.

Dalt released her seventh studio album, A Danger to Ourselves, as Lucrecia Dalt on 5 September 2025.

== Personal life ==
As of September 2025, Dalt was in a relationship with the English musician David Sylvian.

== Discography ==
=== As Lucrecia ===
Albums

- Acerca (Mil records, 2005)
- Acerca Re-edit (Series, 2005)
- Congost (Pruna Recordings, 2009)

EPs

- Like Being Home (Series, 2007)

Remixes

- Camila López + Flamante – Move & Remove Remixes (Series, 2009)

Guest appearances

- [Neuma] – Tobi Ishi (Series, 2008)

Compilation appearances

- Cubik EP (Latin Lovr Crw, 2004)
- 4 Women No Cry Vol. 3 (Monika Enterprise, 2008)

=== As Lucrecia Dalt ===
Studio albums

- Commotus (Human Ear Music, 2012)
- Syzygy (Human Ear Music, 2013)
- Ou (Care Of Editions, 2015)
- Anticlines (RVNG Intl., 2018)
- No Era Sólida (RVNG Intl., 2020)
- ¡Ay! (RVNG Intl., 2022)
- A Danger to Ourselves (RVNG Intl., 2025)

Score albums

- The Seed (Original Score) (Invada Records, 2022)
- The Baby (Original Score) (Invada Records, 2022)
- Rabbit Trap (Original Motion Picture Soundtrack) (Invada Records, 2025)

EPs

- Lucrecia Dalt (Other People, 2014)
- Caes EP (RVNG Intl., 2025)

Compilation appearances

- Series Volumen 2 (Series, 2010)

=== With F.S.Blumm ===
- Cuatro Covers (La Bèl Netlabel, 2011)

=== With Aaron Dilloway ===
Albums

- Field Recordings in the Forest of Colombia (self-released, 2020)
- Lucy and Aaron (Hanson, 2021)

EPs

- Dragon Loops (Deceptions Order bank, 2019)
- Demands of Ordinary Devotion (Hanson, 2021)
- The Blob (Hanson, 2021)
