= Blondes (Blondes album) =

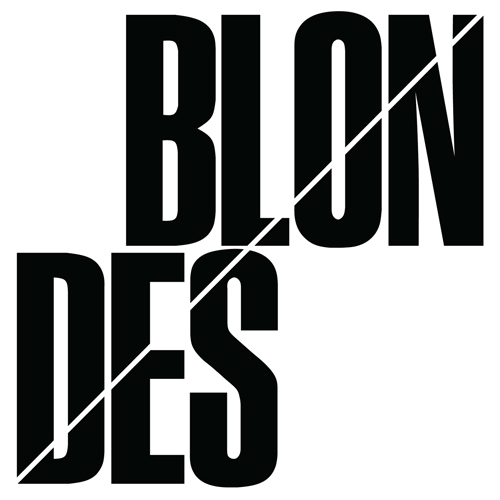

Studio album by Blondes
- Released: February 7, 2012
- Genre: Electronic music, House
- Length: 63:46 (Disc 1); 81:27 (Disc 2); 145:13 (Total)
- Label: RVNG Intl.
- Producer: Sam Haar, Zach Steinman

Blondes chronology
Touched (2010)	Blondes (2012)	Swisher (2013)

Singles from Blondes
- 1. "Lover"/"Hater" Released: March 15, 2011; 2. "Business"/"Pleasure" Released: June 14, 2011; 3. "Wine"/"Water" Released: November 15, 2011

Blondes is the debut full-length album by American electronic duo Blondes, released on February 7, 2012, by RVNG Intl. Critical reception was generally favorable, most notably that of Sean Adams, founder of Drowned in Sound, who lauded the album in a 10/10 review.

== Critical reception ==
Professional ratings
Aggregate scores
Source	Rating
Album of the Year	78/100
AnyDecentMusic?	7.4/10
Metacritic	76/100
Review scores
Source	Rating
Drowned in Sound	10/10
The Irish Times	4/5 stars
musicOMH	4.5/5 stars
NME	8/10
Pitchfork	7.5/10
PopMatters	6/10 stars
Q	4/5 stars
Resident Advisor	4/5
Tiny Mix Tapes	3.5/5 marks
Uncut	3/5 stars

According to the review aggregator Metacritic, Blondes received "generally favorable reviews" based on a weighted average score of 76 out of 100 from 15 critic scores.

=== Accolades ===
Year-end lists for Blondes
Publication	List	Rank	Ref.
MusicOMH	musicOMH's Top 100 Albums of 2012	5	

== Track listing ==
All tracks are written by Sam Haar and Zach Steinman, except "Lover" by Haar, Steinman, and Meredith Monk.

Blondes (disc 1) track listing
No.	Title	Length
1.	"Lover"	6:42
2.	"Hater"	7:45
3.	"Business"	8:55
4.	"Pleasure"	8:55
5.	"Wine"	6:57
6.	"Water"	6:56
7.	"Gold"	9:50
8.	"Amber"	7:46
Total length:		63:46

Blondes (disc 2) track listing
No.	Title	Length
1.	"Lover (A JD Twitch Optimo Mix)"	7:59
2.	"Lover (Dungeon Acid Remix)"	11:32
3.	"Hater (SFV Acid's Encino Oaks Remix)"	6:19
4.	"Business (John Roberts Remix)"	5:38
5.	"Pleasure (Andy Stott Remix)"	7:03
6.	"Pleasure (Robert Miles Remix)"	9:00
7.	"Wine (Teengirl Fantasy Remix)"	3:34
8.	"Water (Bicep Remix)"	8:00
9.	"Gold (One Blonde Strange Idea by Traxx)"	9:56
10.	"Gold (Laurel Halo Chains Remix)"	5:43
11.	"Amber (Variation in CM by Rene Hell)"	6:43
Total length:		81:27

Notes

- "Lover" contains a sample of "Rally" by Meredith Monk.

== Personnel ==
Credits adapted from liner notes.

- Blondes – production, recording, mixing
- Diko Shotmura – engineering (1, 2)
- Volker Schneider – mixing (3, 4)
- Frederic Strader – mastering
- WWFG – design
- Hope Esser – photography
