= Visible Cloaks =

American electronic music duo (e. 2010)

- Origin: Portland, Oregon, U.S.
- Genres: Electronic; new age; ambient
- Years active: 2010–present
- Labels: Musique Plastique; RVNG Intl.
- Members: Spencer Doran; Ryan Carlile
- Website: www.visiblecloaks.com

Visible Cloaks are an American electronic musical duo based in Portland, Oregon, consisting of Spencer Doran and Ryan Carlile. The project originally emerged in 2010 as Doran's solo project, in which he explored rare groove new-age and ambient music from Japan. Carlile joined the project in 2014. Scott Wilson of Fact described their music as "shattering the idea of 'fourth world music'."

The duo's 2017 album Reassemblage, released on RVNG Intl., introduced the duo's cross-influenced sound, taking inspiration from new-age music, Italian minimalism and Japanese ambient music. The record received the "Best New Music" accolade from Pitchfork, and was named an "Album Pick" by AllMusic. The duo's subsequent release Lex (2017) used software programmes to create electronic tranquil melodies, similarly to Reassemblage.

The duo also released Paradessence (2026).

== Discography ==
=== Albums ===
- Visible Cloaks (Musique Plastique, 2014)
- Reassemblage (RVNG Intl., 2017)
- Lex (RVNG Intl., 2017)
- FRKWYS Vol. 15: Serenitatem (with Yoshio Ojima and Satsuki Shibano; RVNG Intl., 2019)
- Paradessence (RVNG Intl., 2026)
