= UkabazUmorezU =

Studio album by Sugai Ken
- Released: October 20, 2017
- Genre: Electroacoustic; experimental; ambient
- Length: 33:08; 38:58 (digital download)
- Label: RVNG Intl.
- Producer: Sugai Ken

Sugai Ken chronology
On The Quakefish (2016)	UkabazUmorezU (2017)

Singles from UkabazUmorezU
- 1. "Wochikaeri to Uzume" Released: August 9, 2017

UkabazUmorezU (Japanese: 不浮不埋), translated in English to "slow and steady wins the race," is the fifth studio album by Japanese musician Sugai Ken and his first LP for the New York-based independent label RVNG Intl. Continuing the ambient electroacoustic style of Ken's previous albums, UkabazUmorezU is a set of musical representations of Japanese folk traditions and "artificial" versions of passageways in the Kanagawa Prefecture during the nighttime. It was released on October 20, 2017 to favorable critical reviews.

== Concept and composition ==
As with previous works by Sugai Ken, UkabazUmorezU follows an ambient electroacoustic style "that hums with the vibrancy of people and tradition, deftly straddling the temporal gap between past and present, myth and reality," Fact summarized. The title of UkabazUmorezU translates to "slow and steady wins the race," which, according to Ken, means "the perseverance of an idea through originality in a world highly influenced by trends." A major concept of the album is Japanese artists' exposure to aspects of art of the Western world, such as a yokai-esque "atmosphere" "speaking through a Western electroacoustic motif," RVNG Intl.'s press release stated.

The sound of UkabazUmorezU is based on Ken's personal interest in an "obscured horizon." UkabazUmorezU involves Ken imagining real-life passageways in the Kanagawa Prefecture during the nighttime before coming up with audio representations of "artificial" versions of them that are "tethered to but abstracted from the natural world" and contain "recontextualized Japanese rituals and tradition." The album mainly consists of synthesizers and recordings and synthesized replications of actual places in Japan and their folk traditions. "Ganoubyoushi" involves the slapping of a Japanese hand fan with conversations in the background to represent the tradition of hand fans, while "Wochikaeri to Uzume" is about an old woman rejuvenating with the help of her respect to water.

Ray Philp of Resident Advisor found it different from Ken's past works for its use of "unlikely" source material, such as the James Ferraro-style "sighing vocal synths" and "funny animal samples." He analyzed some of the tracks, including "Wochikaeri To Uzume" and ""Ganoubyoshi," felt more like "hallucinations" of random sound effects and instruments rather than sound portrayals of Kanagawa. Some songs, such as "Katsura," "Doujiri" and "Wochikaeri To Uzume," have cartoonish orchestral instruments and slapstick Foley that add a surreal element to the album and recall Ken's childhood. A Tiny Mix Tapes found the album different from other ambient records: most ambient albums "resist boundaries and contouring," but UkabazUmorezU is "more particular, insular, imaginary, and full of contours shaped by [...] moments and the spaces between them."

== Release and reception ==
Professional ratings
Review scores
Source	Rating
Resident Advisor	4.1/5
Tiny Mix Tapes	4/5 discs

Ken first contacted RVNG Intl. in the winter of 2015 about joining the label. It let him join after the 2016 release of his album On The Quakefish, and his first release for the label, as well as the lead single of UkabazUmorezU, was "Wochikaeri to Uzume," which came out on August 9, 2017. The video for "Doujiri," released on October 27, 2017, was directed by Kiyotaka “Kiyo” Sumiyoshi and is a visual representation of Ken’s folk-inspired musical style, taking place in a "shadowy forest inhabited by ancient spirits," The Attic summarized. RVNG Intl. distributed UkabazUmorezU on October 20, 2017 via CD and digital download and the vinyl version on November 10. The album garnered favorables from sources such as Resident Advisor and Tiny Mix Tapes upon its release.

== Track listing ==
Derived from the RVNG Intl. official website, with bonus track lengths derived from the official Sugai Ken Bandcamp.

UkabazUmorezU – Standard version
No.	Title	Length
1.	"Wakihi" (湧き祕)	2:19
2.	"Wochikaeri to Uzume" (をちかえりと渦女)	2:49
3.	"Shinobine" (時鳥)	2:59
4.	"Okera" (桶楽)	4:28
5.	"Mei" (冥)	1:00
6.	"Ganoubyoshi" (贋扇拍子)	2:26
7.	"Doujiri" (堂尻)	2:59
8.	"Katsura" (桂)	2:46
9.	"Kugutsu Biwa" (傀儡びわ)	1:23
10.	"Sawariyanagi" (障り柳)	6:07
11.	"Suzunarikibushi" (鈴生り木節)	3:52
Total length:		33:08

UkabazUmorezU – Digital download bonus tracks
No.	Title	Length
12.	"Kanman no Uragasumi" (蚶満の裏霞)	3:43
13.	"Gibaso" (偽番叟)	2:07
Total length:		38:58

== Personnel ==
Derived from the liner notes of UkabazUmorezU.

- Written, performed, and produced by Sugai Ken
- "Okera" mixed by Remold "Moss" Works
- Mastered by Rashad Becker at Dubplates & Mastering in Berlin, Germany

== Release history ==
Region	Date	Format(s)	Label
Worldwide	October 20, 2017	CD; digital download	RVNG Intl.
Worldwide	November 10, 2017	Vinyl	RVNG Intl.
