= Pauline Anna Strom =

American electronic musician (1946–2020)

- Also known as: Trans-Millenia Consort
- Born: October 1, 1946; Baton Rouge, Louisiana
- Died: December 13, 2020 (aged 74) San Francisco, California
- Genre: Electronic
- Occupation: Musician
- Years active: 1982–2020
- Labels: Ether Ship; RVNG Intl.; Trans-Millenia Consort

Pauline Anna Tuell Strom (October 1, 1946 – December 13, 2020) was an American electronic music composer and synthesist best known under the pseudonym Trans-Millenia Consort. Strom made seven recordings between 1982 and 1988 including three LPs and four cassette tapes. Her 1982 debut, Trans-Millenia Consort, was released on Ether Ship Records.

== Early life ==
Strom was born on October 1, 1946, in Baton Rouge, Louisiana. She grew up in a Southern Catholic family with three sisters in Louisiana and Kentucky. Her parents were Paul and Marjorie (Landry) Tuell. Born blind, she learned to navigate the world largely on an auditory plane and to relate to the world through her other senses. During childhood, Strom showed an avid interest in classical music and fiction. She married Robert Strom in 1970.

== Career ==
Strom moved to the Bay Area in the early 1970s and embarked on a career in music by acquiring synthesizers and building compositions with a Tascam four-track recorder. She regularly worked with a Yamaha DX7, Prophet-10, two CS1x keyboards and an E-mu Emulator. She taught herself to compose intuitively. She explained, "I learned as I go. And I learned through repetition—I'd try something and see what I'd get and play with it that way. ... If someone asked me how I did it, I honestly couldn't say how I did it, I just did it. ... I went into a different space. ... I'd start at six at night and I could go until six in the morning." Strom's range of equipment allowed her flexibility in composition and she used this home work station to create 7 albums. She explained: "My mind and imagination were always somewhere else. Music fit. Synthesizers fit. I felt totally at home with this set up, almost like I'd known it before"

Strom said that she translated visual ideas into audio using her setup. As she told Fact, "I like to create what's in my head and interpret that into sound." According to The Wire, her 1980s recordings included everything from visions of ancient civilizations to late-night drone meditations.

Calling herself the Trans-Millenia Consort, Strom mapped an inner world of imagined pasts, possible futures, and alternate realities. She sought to act as a "consort" for her audience, "spiriting listeners through epochs described by her evocative musical passages," according to the label, RVNG Intl.

The ability to tap into, map, and translate an "inner world" into sound recalls Strom's philosophy that everything in the now is rooted in the past, future and present.

== Leaving music industry and re-releases ==
Due to financial constraints, Strom sold all her equipment, stopped making music, and focused on building a spiritual healing practice. After a silent period musically, Trans-Millenia Music, compiled from three albums and four cassette tapes recorded from 1982 through 1988, was released by RVNG Intl. in November 2017. RVNG Intl. describes the album as "a collection of transportive synthesizer music providing listeners a vessel to break beyond temporal limits into a world of pulsing, mercurial tonalities and charged, embryonic waveforms."

The re-circulation of Pauline's music in 2017 was well received by the music press and online magazines. The Wire magazine listed Trans-Millenia Music as No. 2 for Archive Releases of the Year in their 2017 end-of-year list. In an interview with Fact following the release of Trans-Millenia Music, Strom stated that she was hopeful that soon she would be able to obtain a digital audio workstation capable of providing as many possibilities as her previous analogue setup and resume composing music.

Her first album of new compositions in over 30 years, entitled Angel Tears in Sunlight, was announced in November 2020, just a month before her unexpected death. It was released posthumously on RVNG Intl. in February 2021.

Echoes, Spaces, Lines, a box set containing Trans-Millenia Consort, Plot Zero, Spectre, and the previously unreleased album Oceans of Tears, was released in 2023. In 2026, the web-radio NTS released a retrospective episode of her work.

Pauline was a Reiki master, spiritual counselor, and healer. She lived in San Francisco with her pet iguana, Little Soulstice, where she ran a remote healing practice under the name "Reverend Paula." "I strive to teach people to be their own highest authority," she said, telling her clients, "You are in charge of your freedom, and your life. You are connected to the God of your heart."

== Death ==
Strom died on December 13, 2020, at her home in San Francisco. She was 74. A cause of death was not revealed.

== Discography ==
=== Studio albums ===
- Trans-Millenia Consort (vinyl/cassette; Ether Ship Records, 1982)
- Plot Zero (vinyl/cassette; Trans-Millenia Consort Recordings, 1983)
- Spectre (vinyl; Trans-Millenia Consort Recordings, 1984)
- The Moorish Project (cassette; Trans-Millenia Consort Recordings, 1988)
- Japanese Impressions (cassette; Trans-Millenia Consort Recordings, 1988)
- Aquatic Realms (cassette; Trans-Millenia Consort Recordings, 1988)
- Mach 3.04 (cassette; Trans-Millenia Consort Recordings, 1988)
- Angel Tears in Sunlight (vinyl/CD, RVNG Intl., 2021)

=== Compilation albums ===
- Trans-Millenia Music (vinyl/CD; RVNG Intl., 2017)

=== Box sets ===
- Echoes, Spaces, Lines (vinyl/CD; RVNG Intl., 2023)
