= Swish =

Swish may refer to:

== Games ==
- Swish, a basketball shot that goes through the basket without touching the rim or backboard
- Swish, a form of table tennis that can be played both by people who are blind or vision-impaired, and by people who are sighted

== Music ==
- Swish (band), an indie rock band established in 1996
- Swish (hip hop producer), an American hip hop producer/rapper
- Swish (album), an album by Joywave
- SWISH, the former name of the Christian rock band Hawk Nelson
- Swish, the second title for The Life of Pablo, a 2016 album by Kanye West
- "Swish", a song by Kid Ink from the EP 7 Series
- "Swish" (song), a 2018 song by Tyga

== Software ==
- Swish (payment), a mobile phone payment system in Sweden
- SWiSH Max, software used to create cross-platform presentations
- SWISH-E, software to index collections of documents

== People ==
- Bill Nicholson (baseball) of the Chicago Cubs (1914–1996)
- Nick Swisher of the New York Yankees (born 1980)

== Others ==
- Swish cymbal, an exotic ride cymbal used in big band and swing band
- Swishing, a clothing swap event
- Swish, an alcoholic beverage obtained by filling an (empty) cask from a distillery with water to leech the remaining liquor out.
- Swish, a brand of curtain track
- Swish, a 2008 book by Joel Derfner
- Swish function, a mathematical activation function in data analysis
- Swish (slang), effeminate behaviour and interests in gay male communities
- Swish (Neuro-linguistic programming), a technique used to diminish unwanted habits

== See also ==
- Swish Swish, a song by American singer Katy Perry featuring American rapper Nicki Minaj
- Swisher (disambiguation)
