= The Gradual Progression =

Studio album by Greg Fox
- Released: September 8, 2017
- Studio: Figure 8 Recording, Brooklyn
- Genre: Electroacoustic; sound art; post-free jazz; experimental jazz; ambient; kosmische; funk; new age
- Length: 32:38 (vinyl); 37:36 (CD and digital download)
- Label: RVNG Intl.
- Producer: Greg Fox

Greg Fox chronology
Mitral Transmission (2014)	The Gradual Progression (2017)

Singles from The Gradual Progression
- 1. "Catching an L" Released: June 22, 2017

The Gradual Progression is a studio album by American drummer Greg Fox, released on September 8, 2017 by the label RVNG Intl. It depicts his first use of Sensory Percussion, a set of sensors created by drummer Tlacael Esparza where drum hits send MIDI data to virtual instruments. Fox used Sensory Percussion as a way to become flexible with his drumming skills and combine his interests in electronic music with drumming. The album was recorded in Brooklyn in six days and also features instrumental performances from Curtis Santiago, Michael Beharie, Maria Kim Grand, and Justin Frye. The LP garnered favorable reviews from music journalists upon its release.

== Production and composition ==
The press release from RVNG Intl. explains The Gradual Progression "focuses less on [Greg Fox's] drumming and more on its untapped potential as one element in a polyphonic unity" and is intended to "externaliz[e] his polyrhythmic virtuosity into non-physical realms" and "activate spiritual states through physical means." To do this as well as have other sounds perform with the same "intensity and vibrancy" as Fox's drumming, all of the tracks were produced in what RVNG Intl. labeled as the musical form of action painting.

The Gradual Progression is the first album where Fox recorded with Sensory Percussion, a set of sensors created by drummer Tlacael Esparza. He used the beta version of the device that was given to him by Esparza before its official build was released for public consumption. He placed the sensors on his drum kit for it to serve as a MIDI controller triggering sounds on modular synthesizers and virtual instruments he programmed on Ableton. On "By Virtue of Emptiness," each drum was responsible for the note performance of six virtual instruments, including a drum loop being played via the hits of the snare and kick drums, low-frequency bass sounds being triggered by the kick drum, and a high-pitched note being played when the "middle of the snare" is hit. The virtual instrument sounds he used on the album includes material he recorded on his own, such as his friends playing the note of an instrument or street field recordings, and sound effects and foley he pirated off the internet.

Fox was first taught how to use this technology by Milford Graves while he was making his extended play Mitral Transmissions (2014). He wanted to use the sensor device as a way to combine his love for drumming with electronic music, as well as have complete flexibility in his craft and not worry about copying the skill of other drummers. He noticed that using Sensory Percussion "started to take on an architectural quality and an environmental quality," and the drums served as a "blanket" to reveal the "invisible sculpture[s]" that was being made by the virtual instruments." Despite the free-style-esque performance on the album, the songs were not improvised, but rather composed via what Fox labeled "virtual scaffolding," a technique that departed from the "liner" method of writing compositions and was like composing in "virtual reality." Composition of the tracks took place at the non-profit place Pioneer Works for weeks.

== Release and promotion ==
The lead single of The Gradual Progression was "Catching an L," issued on June 22, 2017. Its video was also released the same day, which was filmed by Fox and "re-purposed" by Johann Rashid. Released on September 8, 2017, the video for "By Virtue Of Emptiness" was also directed by Rashid and is a collage of shots of Maria Kim Grand and Michael Beharie performing the song on a rooftop and other footage assembled by Fox. The same day, RVNG Intl. released The Gradual Progression. On October 7, 2017, Fox performed The Gradual Progression at the non-profit New York City art space The Kitchen.

== Critical reception ==
Professional ratings
Aggregate scores
Source	Rating
Metacritic	77/100
Review scores
Source	Rating
Magnet	3/5 stars
Mojo	4/5 stars
Pitchfork	7.7/10

Critical reviews of The Gradual Progression were favorable overall. Bandcamp Daily stated that the album "shows there aren’t any rules to making good music. Do what feels right and let the art fall into place." Magnet magazine described it as a "curious balance between high-concept art and Fox's own fiercely independent spirit and virtuosic talent." Pitchfork labeled the album as "overwhelming but beautiful, like stepping inside a waterfall," also stating that its only dud song was "Catching an L," "a late ’70s funk cast off with weirdly farty synths and a meandering sax." Danny Riley of The Quietus praised the LP as "an unselfconscious attempt to forge forward with music" and "an unabashed statement for progression" but was heavily critical towards Fox's overuse of the Sensory Percussion technology. He stated that it led to sounds that were "meandering and forgettable when presented on their own." Riley also stated that using Sensory Percussion prevented Fox from performing "interplay" required for the "spiritual" jazz style he went for.

== Track listing ==
Derived from the RVNG Intl. website.

The Gradual Progression – Standard version
No.	Title	Length
1.	"The Gradual Progression"	7:04
2.	"Earth Center Possessing Stream"	5:10
3.	"By Virtue of Emptiness"	5:46
4.	"Catching An L"	3:26
5.	"My House of Equalizing Predecessors"	6:32
6.	"OPB"	4:40
Total length:		32:38

The Gradual Progression – CD and digital download bonus track
No.	Title	Length
7.	"Preponderance of the Small"	4:58
Total length:		37:36

== Personnel ==
Derived from the liner notes of The Gradual Progression.

Technical

- Composed, arranged, and recorded by Greg Fox in six days at Figure 8 Recording in Brooklyn
- Mixed and engineered by Eli Crews
- Mastered by Bob Weston at Chicago Mastering Service
- Artwork by Tauba Auerbach

Musicians

- Drums and percussion by Fox
- Vocals on "The Gradual Progression" by Curtis Santiago
- Nylon guitar on "The Gradual Progression" and "By Virtue of Emptiness" by Michael Beharie
- Tenor saxophone on "Earth Center Possessing Stream" and "Catching An L" by Maria Kim Grand
- Upright bass on "By Virtue of Epmtiness" by Justin Frye

== Release history ==
Region	Date	Format(s)	Label
Worldwide	September 8, 2017	CD; digital download; vinyl	RVNG Intl.
