= Holly Herndon =

American composer and musician

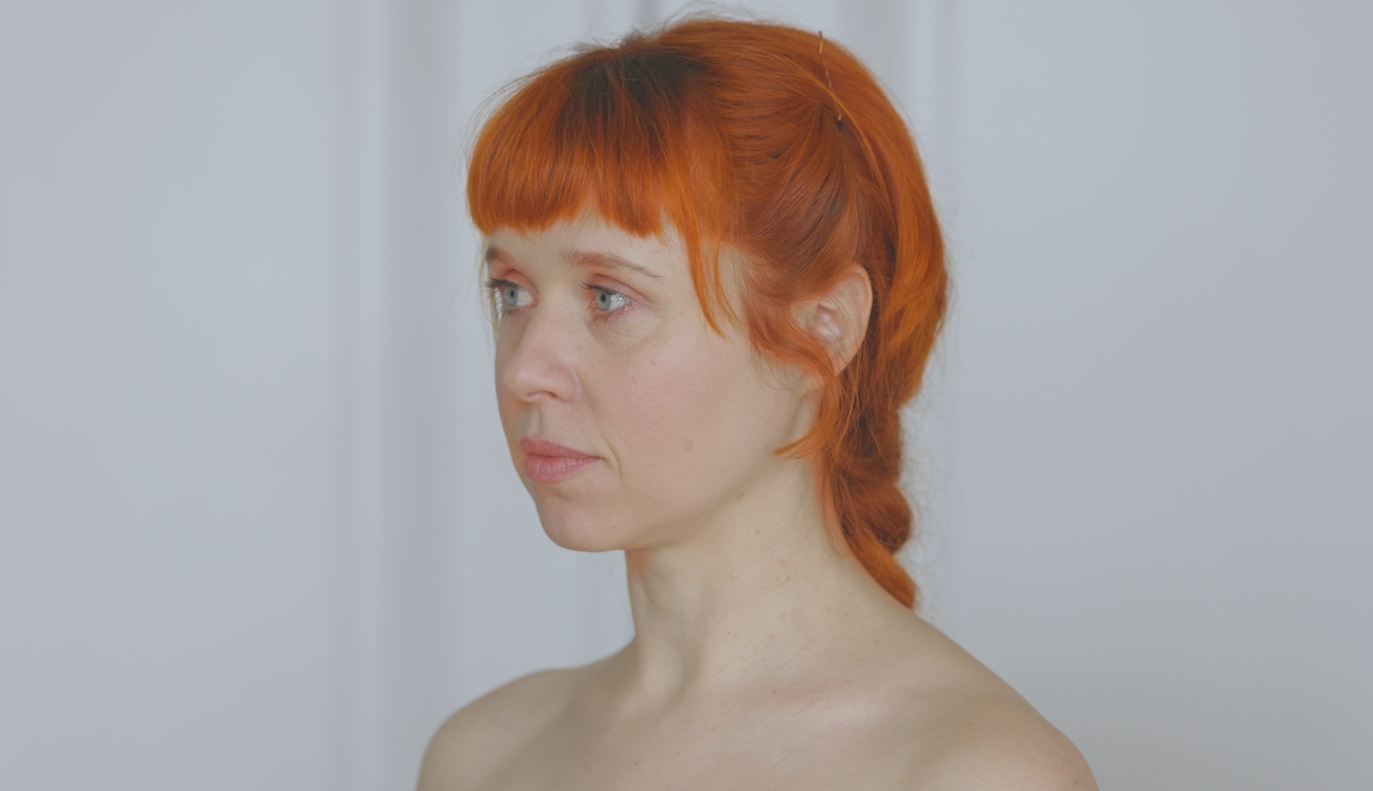
- Herndon in 2026

Background information
- Born: 1980 (age 45–46)
- Origin: Johnson City, Tennessee, U.S.
- Genres: Electronic; experimental
- Occupations: Composer; musician; producer
- Instruments: Vocals; DAW; Max/MSP
- Years active: 2009–present
- Labels: 4AD; RVNG Intl.
- Website: www.hollyherndon.com

Holly Herndon (born 1980) is an American artist and composer based in Berlin, Germany. After studying composition at Stanford University and completing her Ph.D. at Stanford University's Center for Computer Research in Music and Acoustics, she pursued a music career internationally. Herndon's music often includes human singing voices (including her own), is primarily computer-based, and regularly uses the visual programming language Max/MSP to create custom instruments and vocal processes. She has released music on the labels RVNG Intl. and 4AD. Her third full-length album, Proto, was released on May 10, 2019.

In addition to her solo work, Herndon has been involved in numerous artistic collaborations, including projects with Iranian writer Reza Negarestani, Chicago-based producer Jlin and Dutch design studio Metahaven. Her long standing collaborator is Mathew Dryhurst. Herndon and Dryhurst are notable for their work exploring the possibilities of creating content using technologies such as AI, Web 3.0, and blockchain. Herndon and Dryhurst host a podcast called Interdependence, where they discuss technology and the arts with guests who are working at the forefront of integrating arts and technology in their work.

== Biography ==
=== Early life and education ===
Holly Herndon was born in 1980 and raised in Johnson City, Tennessee. As a teenager, she spent several years living in Berlin on a high school exchange program, absorbed in the city's dance and techno scene. When Herndon returned to the United States she began studying electronic music at Mills College in Oakland, California. She studied under John Bischoff, James Fei, Maggi Payne, and Fred Frith, receiving her MFA in Electronic Music and Recording Media. While at Mills she composed the vocal-generated piece 195, which won her the Elizabeth Mills Crothers award for best composer in 2010. At school she focused on laptop performance, and she currently does most of her composing via laptop. In 2011 she released Car, an independent, near hour-long track on cassette. In 2012, she was a doctoral candidate in composition at Stanford University. At Stanford she continued to use coding software such as Max/MSP to program many of her own electronic instruments and patches. Herndon successfully defended her dissertation in 2019.

=== Movement (2012) ===
While attending Mills she began developing her debut album Movement. Movement was released in November 2012 through RVNG Intl, a record label based in Brooklyn. For the album she used the visual programming language Max/MSP to create custom instruments and vocal processes.

Movement received a score of 8.1 on Pitchfork, who stated that Herndon "uses her crystalline voice as a chief input for her laptop, ultimately arriving at a poignant nexus of electronic accessibility and experimentation that owes as much to her academic forebears as her club contemporaries. It's a record with the rare capacity to turn cynics who might scoff at the idea of laptops-as-intimate-instruments into believers."

According to The Quietus, "Movement's sound certainly has its forebears and contemporaries – it's possible to detect traces of everyone from Coil and Aphex Twin to Ellen Allien and Laurel Halo in the mix – but equally it contains elements, both sonic and thematic, that are quite unlike any other electronic music currently out there." Also, "Herndon's music reflects the ambiguous nature of our interactions with these technologies. It's by turns sensual, blissful and disturbing, and often hints towards all three states at once."

=== Chorus (2014) ===
Her single "Chorus" was released on January 24, 2014, with a music video created by Akihiko Taniguchi. "Chorus" was named Best New Track by Pitchfork. For sounds to build the song, Herndon sampled her browsing experience on the internet, incorporating sources such as YouTube and Skype. The video focuses explicitly on the personal nature of modern computing. According to Herndon, "The more comfortable we get with these devices, the more vulnerable we are. We are learning more and more about the NSA revelations; I think it is really interesting that we have never been more intimate with these machines, and at the same time have never had such cause to be suspicious of them. We wanted to capture both of those sides."

The full Chorus EP was also released in January both on vinyl and digitally, and it received an 8.0 and positive review in Pitchfork. According to Create Digital Music, "few artists have managed to meld the dark thump of techno with the intricate constructions of post-minimalist new music quite like Holly Herndon. Her rapid-punctuated, ethereal vocals... float above complex, dance music-inspired machinery, producing an effect that is arrestingly gorgeous and frightening all at once."

=== Home (2014) ===
Herndon released the single "Home" on September 16, 2014, with a video directed by Dutch design studio Metahaven. According to Herndon, it captures her feeling of losing trust in electronics after the revelations the NSA monitors what some Americans do online. "Home" continues "Chorus"'s theme of surveillance: "It is a love song for prying eyes (an agent / a critic), and also a break up song with the devices with which I shared a naive relationship."

=== Platform (2015) ===
Herndon's second full-length album, Platform, was released on May 19, 2015. Guest artists include Dryhurst, the Dutch design studio Metahaven, Spencer Longo, and Claire Tolan. The album explores a complicated relationship with technology, and includes a track titled "Lonely at the Top" that is intended to trigger Autonomous sensory meridian response (ASMR). Addressing themes of internet decentralization by actively exploring the concept of decentralized autonomous organizations (DAOs), Platform was created through the Internet in collaboration between Dryhurst and Herndon and strangers from all over the world.

=== Recruit (2015) ===
In 2015, Dryhurst and Herndon released an eleven minute long track called "Recruit", which they made for British menswear line Cottweiler. The artwork merges outdoor soundscapes alongside Herndon's treated vocal samples.

=== Proto (2019) ===
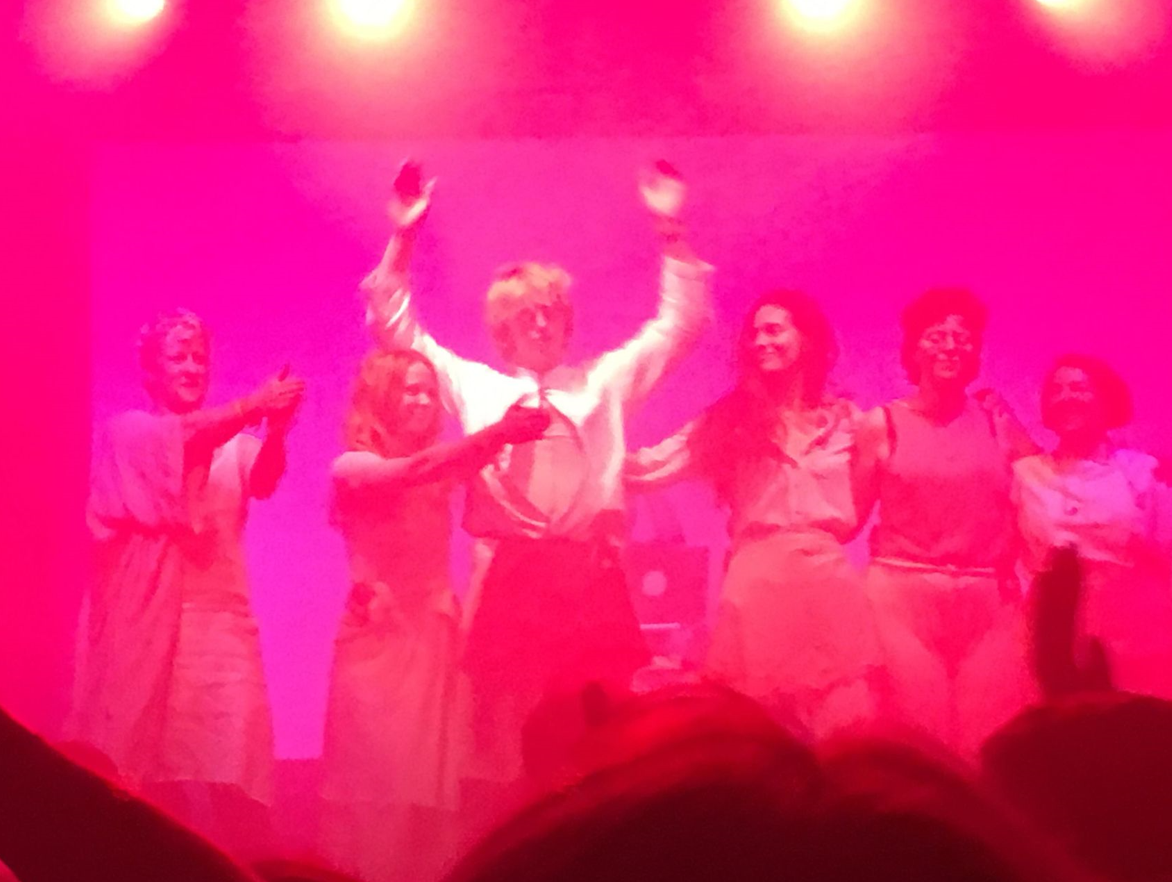
Herndon (second from left) performing Proto in Bristol, 2019

Herndon's third full-length album, Proto, was released on May 10, 2019. This collaborative work with Dryhurst and programmer Jules LaPlace involved a singing AI named Spawn, which they developed over the course of several years. Spawn is an artificial neural network that is trained to recognize and replicate human voices. Spawn learned to create original music through Herndon, Dryhurst, and LaPlace feeding it audio files, largely featuring Herndon's own singing voice. They also trained Spawn to learn diverse vocal types by having it listen to the singing voices of others. While making Proto, they held "training ceremonies" which are live performances where participants sing to Spawn.

=== Holly+ (2021) ===
In 2021, Dryhurst and Herndon developed Holly+, a protocol that addresses concerns associated with deepfakes and distributed "identity play." Holly+ is a method to decentralize Herndon's own identity, which enables a community of stewards to determine whether new media created with her voice should be co-sold in collaboration with Holly herself. Utilizing Holly+, the public can upload polyphonic tracks to a website that are then reinterpreted and performed by a deepfaked version of Herdon's voice. In 2021, a real time version of Holly+ premiered at Sonar Festival in Barcelona, Spain in collaboration with Maria Arnal and Tarta Relena. Holly+ was also presented at TED2022: A New Era in April 2022 with Pher. In November 2022, Holly+ performed a cover version of Dolly Parton's "Jolene". A modified score of the original song composed of new tonal harmonies was fed to Holly+ and then generated in Herndon's voice. Dryhurst and Herndon won the 2022 Ars Electronica STARTS prize for digital art for Holly+. Some of these songs were sold on as NFTs on the Zora platform.

=== Touring and exhibitions ===
Herndon has toured throughout Europe and the United States. She played the CTM Festival on January 31, 2013, in Berlin.

Herndon contributed a composition titled "Relations" for artist Conrad Shawcross' installation, ADA, which was on view at the Palais de Tokyo in Paris, from February 4 to May 19, 2014.

In May 2016, Herndon played seven shows with Radiohead in Amsterdam, Paris and London. She was joined on stage by Mat Dryhurst and Colin Self.

Herndon's first foray into exhibiting her own visual art installations in an art gallery was in 2015, at Hamburg's Kunstverein space. The project was commissioned by ZKM | Center for Art and Media's Sound Dome. The exhibition, titled Everywhere and Nowhere, featured a combination of a 23.2-channel sound installation and related video works, as well as live performances by dancer and choreographer Jone San Martin, Jiu Jitsu fighter Sam Forsythe, and artist Brian Rogers.

Herndon created a piece in collaboration with Mat Dryhust for the 2024 Whitney Biennial, which consisted of training an A.I. model with images of Herndon. Visitors to the Whitney Museum website could prompt the chatbot to generate images based solely on this dataset. Several large-format digital prints of images generated from the model were also displayed within the museum during the Biennial.

=== Spawning ===
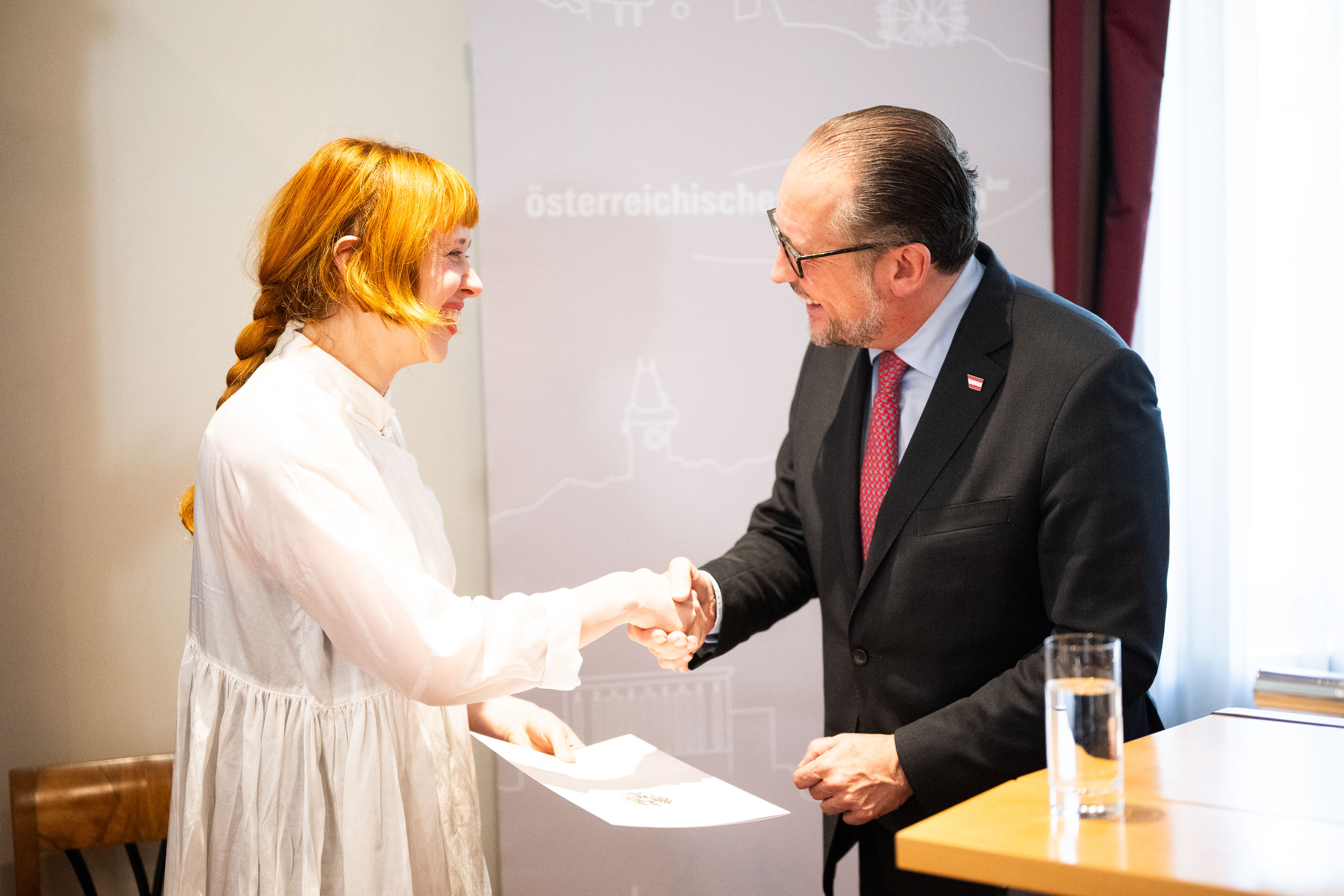
Herndon being awarded an Art Prize for Digital Human Rights in 2024 by Alexander Schallenberg, foreign minister of Austria.

In 2022, Dryhurst and Herndon, along with Jordan Meyer and Patrick Hoepner launched Spawning. They coined the term "spawning" to describe generating media from a training set using machine learning. Spawning enables artists to consciously opt in or out of the datasets which AI art generators use to train and create compositions. They set up a website called haveibeentrained.com, where artists can search the nearly 5.8 billion images in the Laion-5b dataset that is used to train AI art models Stable Diffusion and Midjourney. If an artist finds out that their work exists within the dataset, Spawning allows them to declare whether they want to continue or terminate the use of their imagery for AI training. In March 2023, Spawning, partnering with stock footage company Shutterstock and portfolio platform Artstation, announced that 80 million artworks have been opted out of Stable Diffusion V3 to honor artists' claims. Spawning's approach has been cited as being instructive towards guiding the European Union's policy on text and data mining.

In 2023, Spawning launched Source.plus, "a tool to search and curate image collections into individually tailored training datasets." As of 2026, the site is no longer available and the domain for sale.

=== Teaching ===
Herndon has taught, lecturered, and performed workshops at conferences, festivals, academies, and mentorship programs, such as Forecast in Berlin.

== Discography ==
=== Studio albums ===
Title	Details
Car	Released: 2011; Label: Independent; Format: Cassette, digital
Movement	Released: November 13, 2012; Label: RVNG Intl.; Format: 12" vinyl, Digital
Chorus EP	Released: January 21, 2014; Label: RVNG Intl.; Format: 12" vinyl, digital
Platform	Released: May 19, 2015; Label: 4AD; Format: 12" vinyl, digital
Proto	Released: May 10, 2019; Label: 4AD; Format: CD, 12" vinyl, digital

=== Singles ===
Title	Release details	Album
"Dilato"	Released: November 13, 2012; Format: Digital, score	Movement
"Chorus"	Released: January 24, 2014; Format: 12" vinyl, digital	Chorus EP
"Home"	Released: September 16, 2014; Format: Digital	Platform
"Lucifer"	Released: August 6, 2021; Format: Digital	MUTANTS VOL. 5: FREE

=== Compositions ===
- 2010: 195 (winner of the Elizabeth Mills Crothers award for best composition 2010)
- 2013: BodySound: Solo Duet with Cuahtemoc Peranda
- 2013: ADA with Conrad Shawcross
- 2013: Being There with TILT Brass

=== Collaborations, other ===
- 2009: Score Generating Vocal Network Piece
- 2009: Mills Improvisation Ensemble
- 2010: +Dialog
- 2011: CCM
- 2011: CCM Artist in Residency Series
- 2012: <body> with Mathew Dryhurst
- 2012: Collusion with Reza Negarestani & Mathew Dryhurst
- 2013: C.回.R with Mathew Dryhurst - hackathon
- 2013: K回IRO with Mathew Dryhurst - exhibit
- 2014: Call with Mathew Dryhurst and Metahaven

=== Music Videos ===
- "Interference" (2015)
- "Morning Sun" (2015)
- "Godmother" (2018)
- "Eternal" (2019)
- "Jolene" (2022)

== See also ==
- List of 21st-century classical composers
