= Reassemblage (album) =

2017 album by Visible Cloaks

Studio album by Visible Cloaks
- Released: February 17, 2017
- Genre: New-age; ambient; vaporwave
- Length: 40:44
- Label: RVNG Intl.
- Producer: Ryan Carlile; Spencer Doran

Visible Cloaks chronology
Visible Cloaks (2015)	Reassemblage (2017)	Lex (2017)

Singles from Reassemblage
- 1. "Valve" / "Valve (Revisited)" Released: October 5, 2016; 2. "Terrazzo" Released: November 16, 2016; 3. "Neume" Released: February 2, 2017

Reassemblage is the second studio album by Portland, Oregon duo Visible Cloaks, consisting of musicians Spencer Doran and Ryan Carlile. The record is named after Trinh T. Minh-ha's 1982 documentary film of the same name, since both works observe its subject matter without showing meaning to it. Reassemblage departs from Doran's past hip-hop releases for a more high-quality style inspired by the works of Japanese synthesizer music acts such as Yellow Magic Orchestra and Ryuichi Sakamoto, all of which were featured on Doran's 2010 mix Fairlights, Mallets & Bamboo.

Reassemblage uses Doran's "fourth world Japan" music structure similar to the "fourth world" concept of composer Jon Hassell, where virtual replications of acoustic instruments specific to nations all across the globe are played together to create a virtual world. The combinations of these sounds lead to discombobulated situations to the point where the source of the sounds are unknown and all of the sonic textures "end up sounding like something else.” Reassemblage was released on the label RVNG Intl. on February 17, 2017, and landed on the American Billboard Dance/Electronic and New Age albums charts. Its cover art was created by digital installation artist Brenna Murphy, who was also responsible for creating the record's three music videos and visual environments. The album garnered generally favorable reviews from music journalists, the most positive reviews praising its unique sound.

== Production and composition ==
“With all that Japanese stuff recorded in the ’80s, [the producers] were working in the best studios in the world at the time. It was at the peak of analogue, where analogue and digital meet at this perfect technological way of recording.”

— Spencer Doran on his Japanese music influences for Reassemblage

Fact journalist Scott Wilson categorized Reassemblage's overall sound as a combination of the works of Yellow Magic Orchestra and the album R Plus Seven (2013) by Oneohtrix Point Never. The album's sound palette mainly consists of high-quality, polished software instrument replication of instruments specific to many nations all over the world. The album marks a shift in Doran's overall career from an instrumental hip-hop sound to a hi-fi and bright style inspired by the works of Japanese synthesizer music acts such as Yellow Magic Orchestra and Ryuichi Sakamoto that were featured on Doran's 2010 mix Fairlights, Mallets & Bamboo. The clean production attribute of the record was mainly influenced by the works of Japanese engineer Seigen Ono. The Japanese aspect of the record came from Doran's experience of touring the country as being a part of the Japanese label Easelmusic. As Doran said, “We’re coming out of this scene of music that, for the longest time, was very lo-fi and very DIY. And now the technology has advanced to the point where it’s really easy to make things sound really clear—and that’s something I’ve always been drawn to."

In making an uncanny sound for Reassemblage, Visible Cloak used complex audio production methods. Creating the virtual setting of Reassemblage involved using Audio Ease's Altiverb reverb plug-in, which re-creates reverberation of real-life places, on the virtual instruments. Multiple patches from the plug-in were put together to create a "psychedelic effect" where the instruments move through different spaces: "When you combine that with using these hyper-realistic software instruments it creates a confusing feeling, in that it’s something that’s very real, but you can expose the artifice the space has by playing with these impossible elements.” The track "Valve" is a key example of the duo's attempt in developing an unnatural tone for the album. It features a sample of spoken word vocals by Miyako Koda from "Sea of Love," a track on Japanese band Dip in the Pool's album Jupiter (1998); the phonemes of what she is speaking are also translated to MIDI notes for them to be played on glassy, vapor-like synthesizer sounds which serve as a "shadow" of Koda's vocals according to Beta. The album closes with "Place," a song where the duo, in the words of Wilson, uses "software that randomly generates a new set of notes every time the track is recorded to disk." The note generations were inspired by John Cage's use of the ancient Chinese text I Ching and the use of prime numbers by Walter Zimmermann, and attempt to get Doran's ego "out of the process” on the album.

Finlayson also labeled Reassemblage's use of voices to be an essential part of the album. "Bloodstream" begins with arpeggio lines played through synthesizers with very few snippets of someone talking popping up. Quivering sounds then come into the track which, according to Finlayson, are either meant to be synthesizer patches intended to only sound like human voices or a vocoder robot. "Mask" includes mallets and artificial birdsong sounds which are abrupted also by synthesized sounds. Finlayson described "Neume" as a robotic choir "update of baroque choral music."

Tiny Mix Tapes critic Michael J. wrote that despite using sounds that are "no longer all that surprising," Reassemblage is "oddly intangible," which is contributed by its "low-key unpredictability" and inability to find a specific basic structure for each track. He suggests that the album's focus is more on how the sounds develop into a track rather the sounds themselves, which is impossible to figure out and "something hard to derive from a naive engagement with it": "I can perceive no internal or internalized necessity to what happens. I perceive only shapes of a tranquil kind of contingency, a host of serene accidents floating by on the surface of a deeper current I can’t see, the forces and obstacles shaping not clearly detectable as part of the audible outward appearances."

== Concept ==
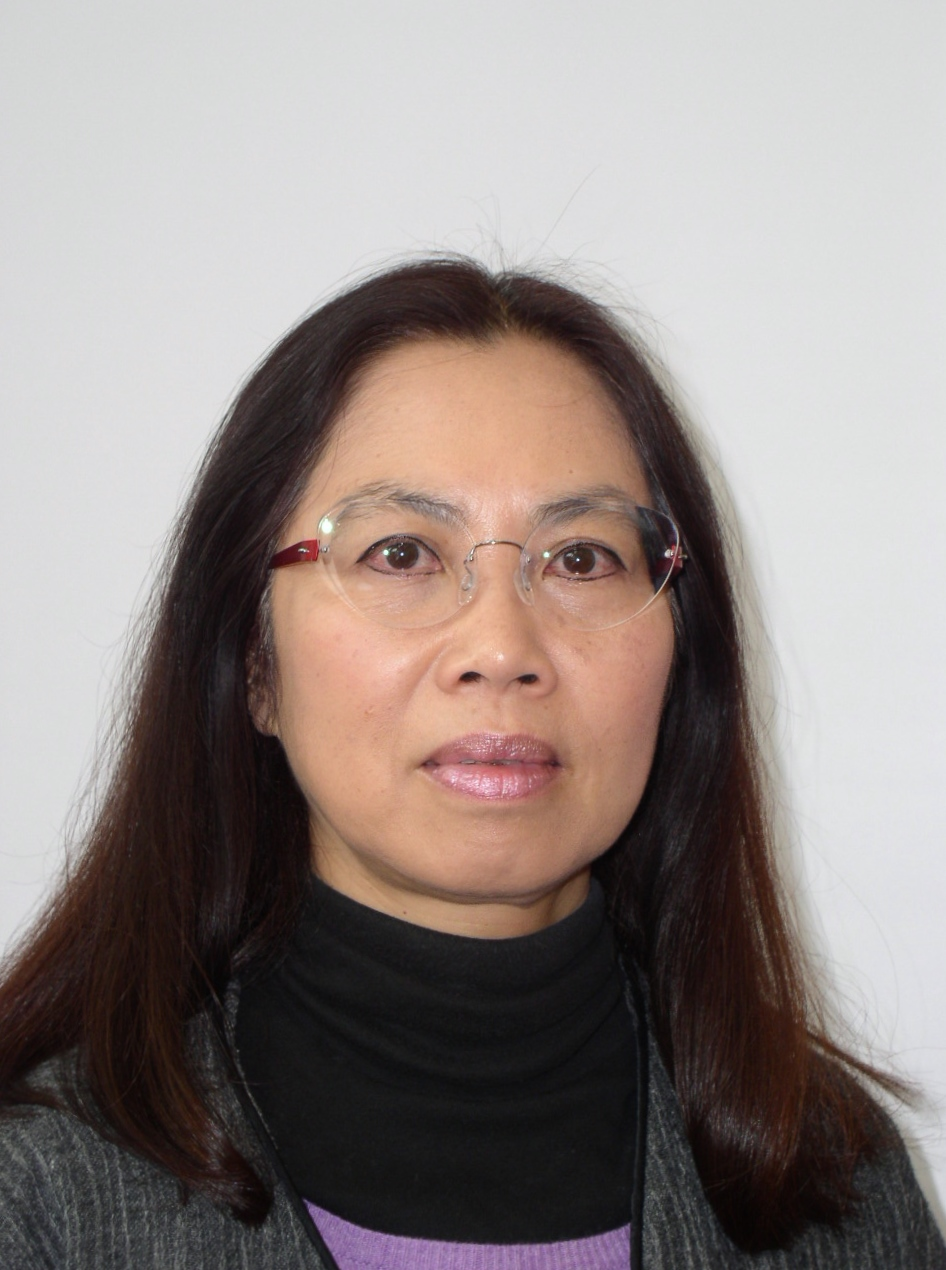
Like Trinh T. Minh-ha's documentary film of the same name, Reassemblage perceives music cultures from around the globe without giving any meaning to it.

Reassemblage uses a method similar to Vietnamese filmmaker Trinh T. Minh-ha's 1982 documentary film that it is named after, where it perceives music cultures from around the globe without giving any meaning to it. As Doran explained, “I think a lot of the point of her film, which is a very feminist take on this footage that she’s shot, is that we can’t really just ascribe our own external meaning on images of other people, because meaning is easily lost when you’re from another culture looking into someone else’s vantage point." All of the virtual instruments are played at the same time in attempts unforeseen to the listener as part of Doran's "fourth world Japan" concept, identical to the "fourth world" concept of American composer Jon Hassell. The concept involves instruments coming together to make a virtual world where they co-exist with each other.

Reassemblage is summarized by RVNG Intl.'s press release as "a collection of delicately rendered passages of silence and sound that invokes – and invites – consciousness." This means that the album, in the words of writer Pryor Stroud, "exalts silence just as much as it values surprise." In “Bloodstream," a collection of sounds described by Stroud as "bio-mechanical gibberish" comes to a halt, but then rises again into "a long, momentous exhalation [...] surging out of that uncanny valley between the human voice and synthesizer that can be so disorienting." As Stroud writes, "It’s exhilaration, weightlessness, a feeling that one is flying through clouds spitting bursts of lightning that pose no threat and offer amazing spectacles of light."

Doran described "fourth world Japan" as a more varied and abstract version of Hassell's concept; unlike Hassell's works which were singular and dull, Reassemblage contains sounds from different world cultures and styles that come together to create a discombobulated situation to the point where the source of the sounds are unknown and all of the sonic textures "end up sounding like something else.” As critic Andy Beta put it, "Cloaks tease [the sounds] out so that they clench and exhale, emerging as digital blips that seem as natural as breath." This combination of digital and organic sound aspects lends the record a retrofuturistic feel. “Screen" consists of water sounds that become higher in pitch and wrinkly in tone as the track progresses, eventually turning into fabricated cellophane-esque sea textures. "Terrazzo" includes a flute that digitally bends into a shakuhachi throughout the song. According to writer Phillip Sherburne, the flute is the central point of the song and an example of sounds that represent the yearning of going into an alien landscape in Visible Cloaks' works. Meanwhile, blips, crystal-like sounds and unharmonous koto plucks come together to create a glitched, alien world or "a celebration of faked human inflection" as Resident Advisor journalist Angus Finlayson described. "Circle" includes a saxophone that "is sent into bizarre, breathy paroxysms." Wilson described the record's overall instrumental structure as a utopian view of a schismatic political environment and a reinforcement of multiculturalism. Finlayson wrote that the album "brushes against knotty debates about appropriation, exoticism and decontextualised borrowing in the online age."

== Release and promotion ==
The lead single of Reassemblage was "Valve" / "Valve (Revisited)," released for digital download on October 5, 2016. An interactive environment based on the song was released for Macintosh computers that same day and created by digital installation artist Brenna Murphy of art collective MSHR, who also created Reassemblage’s cover art and two other music videos and visual landscapes, "Terrazzo" and "Nueme." "Terrazzo" was the second single released from the album, issued on November 16, 2016 and covered under NPR Music's "Recommended Dose" column. Its video and virtual environment was released the same day. The album's third single, "Neume," and its video premiered on February 2, 2017. An official release party for the album took place at the Holocene live music venue in Portland, Oregon on February 28, 2017.

== Critical reception ==
Professional ratings
Aggregate scores
Source	Rating
Metacritic	80/100
Review scores
Source	Rating
The 405	8/10
AllMusic	3.5/5 stars
Exclaim!	6/10
Pitchfork	8.7/10
Popmatters	8/10 stars
Resident Advisor	4.2/5
Tiny Mix Tapes	3/5 stars

Finlayson, reviewing for Resident Advisor, awarded Reassemblage the "Resident Advisor Recommends" label, calling the LP the best work using digital software to create experimental and abstract material. Beta, in his review for Pitchfork, awarded the album the "Best New Album" label, honoring it to be abstract yet accessible to mainstream listeners similar to the albums Endless Summer (2001) by Fennesz and Replica (2011) by Oneohtrix Point Never. Similar praise came from AllMusic journalist Paul Simpson, who called it "intriguing and accessible, yet just strange enough to stand out among all the other experimental electronic artists mining the early new age era for inspiration."

Beta especially spotlighted Visible Cloaks' use of early digital sounds that was very unusual from most vaporwave releases and works in the style of Daniel Lopatin, James Ferraro, and Laurel Halo. Stroud, reviewing for Popmatters, also praised its sound as distinctive from most ambient release, calling the album "of remarkable restraint that never feels overly restricted." He concluded, "Visible Cloaks understand the same rules underlying ambient music that Eno does; the key difference is: because of their youth or in spite of it, they’re willing to break a few more." Exclaim!, in a more mixed review, felt that Reassemblage would only interest listeners that are into the Japanese music of the 1980s the album regards.

== Accolades ==
First-half-of-year-end lists
Publication	Rank
The A.V. Club	*
The Vinyl Factory	*
Year-end lists
Publication	Rank
Bleep.com	*
Crack	44
Fact	12
The Morning News	*
Piccadilly Records	99
Pitchfork (Electronic)	7
The Quietus	45
Resident Advisor	*
The Vinyl Factory	14
"*" indicates an unordered list.

== Track listing and credits ==
The following information adapted from the liner notes of Resassemblage and the RVNG Intl. press release:

All tracks written and produced by Spencer Doran and Ryan Carlile.

Reassemblage – Standard version
No.	Title	Additional producer	Length
1.	"Screen"		3:21
2.	"Valve" (featuring Miyako Koda)		3:24
3.	"Bloodstream"		3:36
4.	"Terrazzo" (featuring Motion Graphics)	Joe Williams	3:41
5.	"Wintergreen"		2:47
6.	"Circle"		3:25
7.	"Mask"		5:38
8.	"Mimesis"		5:04
9.	"Skyscraper"		0:37
10.	"Neume" (featuring Matt Carlson)	Matt Carlson	3:44
11.	"Place"		5:27
Total length:			40:44

Reassemblage – Digital download and CD exclusive bonus tracks
No.	Title	Lyrics	Music	Length
12.	"Valve (Revisited)" (Accompaniment by Dip in the Pool)	Miyako Koda	Tatsuji Kimura, Visible Cloaks	3:13
13.	"Imprint"			6:13
14.	"Moon"			2:25
15.	"Cave"			2:19
Total length:				54:54

Additional credits

- Mixed by Spencer Doran at Yale Union in Portland, Oregon
- Mastered by Rashad Becker at Dubplates & Mastering in Berlin, Germany
- Cover art and "additional interactive material" by Brenna Murphy
- Cover art design by Will Work For Good in Brooklyn, New York

== Release history ==
Region	Date	Format(s)	Label
Worldwide	February 17, 2017	CD; digital download; vinyl	RVNG Intl.

== Charts ==
Chart (2017)	Peak position
US Dance/Electronic Albums (Billboard)	25
US New Age Albums (Billboard)	10
