= Swisher (surname) =

Swisher is a surname. Notable people with the surname include:

- Bella French Swisher (1837–1893), American writer
- Bob Swisher (1914–1979), American football player
- Carl Brent Swisher (1897-1968), American legal historian
- Charles W. Swisher (1867-1927), thirteenth West Virginia Secretary of State
- Clark Swisher (1916–2005), American football and basketball coach
- Clayton Swisher (born 1977), American journalist and author
- Gloria Wilson Swisher (born 1935), American composer, educator and pianist
- Howard Llewellyn Swisher (1870-1935), American businessperson, writer, and historian
- Jay C. Swisher (1921-2008), American politician
- JoAnna Garcia Swisher (born 1979), American actress and businessperson, wife of baseball player Nick Swisher
- Joel Swisher (born 1943), American college football coach
- Kara Swisher (born 1962), American technology journalist
- Laura Swisher, American actress and comedian
- Luis Swisher (born 1978), Guatemalan football player
- Nick Swisher (born 1980), American baseball player, husband of actress JoAnna Garcia Swisher
- Phil Swisher (born 1967), American guitarist
- Steve Swisher (born 1951), American baseball player, father of baseball player Nick Swisher
