= Blondes (band) =

American musical duo

- Origin: New York City, New York, United States
- Genres: Electronic; techno; house
- Labels: RVNG Intl.; Merok; R&S
- Members: Sam Haar; Zach Steinman
- Website: www.blondeblondeblondes.com

Blondes is an American electronic duo based in New York City. The band consists of Sam Haar and Zach Steinman. The group is signed to RVNG Intl.

== Discography ==
=== Studio albums ===
Title	Details
Blondes	Released: February 7, 2012; Label: RVNG Intl.; Format: Digital download, CD
Swisher	Released: August 6, 2013; Label: RVNG Intl.; Format: Digital download, CD
Warmth	Released: August 11, 2017; Label: R&S Records; Format: Digital download, CD

=== Extended plays ===
Title	Details
Touched	Released: June 28, 2010; Label: RVNG Intl.; Format: Digital download, CD
Persuasion	Released: August 2015; Label: RVNG Intl.; Format: Digital download, CD

=== Singles ===
Title	Year	Album
"Lover" / "Hater"	2011	Blondes
"Business" / "Pleasure"	2011	Blondes
"Wine" / "Water"	2011	Blondes
"Rein"	2015	Non-album single
