= Swisher (album) =

Studio album by Blondes
- Released: August 6, 2013
- Genre: Electronic
- Length: 72:02
- Label: RVNG Intl.

Blondes chronology
Blondes (2011)	Swisher (2013)	Persuasion (2015)

Swisher is the second studio album by American electronic duo Blondes. It was released in August 2013 on RVNG Intl.

== Critical reception ==
Professional ratings
Aggregate scores
Source	Rating
Album of the Year	81/100
AnyDecentMusic?	7.8/10
Metacritic	84/100
Review scores
Source	Rating
AllMusic	4/5 stars
Dummy	9/10
Exclaim!	7/10
musicOMH	4.5/5 stars
NME	4/5 stars
Pitchfork	7.9/10
PopMatters	8/10 stars
Resident Advisor	4/5
Spin	8/10
Uncut	6/10

According to the review aggregator Metacritic, Swisher received "generally favorable reviews" based on a weighted average score of 80 out of 100 from 14 critic scores.

=== Accolades ===
In terms of year-end lists of best albums, Swisher was the 20th best according to XLR8R, ranked number 35 on Obscure Sound's list, was number 40 on the ranking by Rough Trade Records, 48 on Urban Outfitters' list, and 59 on Crack Magazine's.

== Track listing ==
All tracks are written by Sam Haar and Zach Steinman.

Swisher track listing
No.	Title	Length
1.	"Aeon"	3:55
2.	"Bora Bora"	8:56
3.	"Andrew"	9:38
4.	"Poland"	7:53
5.	"Clasp"	5:19
6.	"Swisher"	6:57
7.	"Rei"	6:39
8.	"Wire"	10:31
9.	"Elise"	7:37
10.	"Wire (Claro Intelecto Remix)"	7:03
Total length:		72:02

== Personnel ==
Credits adapted from liner notes.

- Sam Haar – recording
- Zach Steinman – recording
- Joe Lambert – mastering
- WWFG – graphic design
- Steinman and Tear – artwork
