= Proto (Holly Herndon album) =

Studio album by Holly Herndon
- Released: May 10, 2019
- Length: 44:07
- Label: 4AD
- Producer: Holly Herndon; Mat Dryhurst

Holly Herndon chronology
Platform (2015)	Proto (2019)

Proto (stylized in all caps) is the third studio album by American electronic musician Holly Herndon. It was released on May 10, 2019, via 4AD. It includes the singles "Godmother" and "Eternal", with the video of the latter accompanying the album announcement. The album was called a collaboration with an AI named "Spawn" co-created by Herndon and Mat Dryhurst.

== Background ==
The album was created in a collaboration with an AI program named "Spawn", created by Herndon and Mat Dryhurst, and located in a "DIY souped-up gaming PC". It features "live vocal processing and timeless folk singing" with an "emphasis on alien song craft". The album features "live training" sessions during which vocalists recruited by Herndon and Dryhurst would teach Spawn how to interpret sounds. Herndon has said that her aim is to make technology seem less "dehumanizing".

== Critical reception ==
Professional ratings
Aggregate scores
Source	Rating
AnyDecentMusic?	8.0/10
Metacritic	82/100
Review scores
Source	Rating
AllMusic	4.5/5 stars
Exclaim!	9/10
Financial Times	3/5 stars
The Guardian	4/5 stars
The Observer	5/5 stars
Pitchfork	8.2/10
Q	4/5 stars
Resident Advisor	3.8/5
The Times	4/5 stars
Uncut	7/10

According to the review aggregator Metacritic, Proto received "universal acclaim" based on a weighted average score of 82 out of 100 from 18 critic scores.

=== Accolades ===
Year-end lists for Proto
Publication	List	Rank	Ref.
BrooklynVegan	BrooklynVegan's Top 50 Albums of 2019	32	
Crack	The Top 50 Albums of the Year	36	
DJ Mag	DJ Mag's Top 50 Albums of 2019	6	
NPR	The 25 Best Albums of 2019	17	
Pitchfork	The 50 Best Albums of 2019	44	
The Quietus	Quietus Albums of the Year 2019	37	
Slant Magazine	The 25 Best Albums of 2019	21	
Stereogum	The 50 Best Albums of 2019	13	
Under the Radar	Under the Radar's Top 100 Albums of 2019	99	
Vice	The 100 Best Albums of 2019	34	

== Track listing ==
Proto track listing
No.	Title	Length
1.	"Birth"	1:14
2.	"Alienation"	3:43
3.	"Canaan (Live Training)"	1:36
4.	"Eternal"	4:45
5.	"Crawler"	5:57
6.	"Extreme Love" (with Lily Anna Hayes and Jenna Sutela)	2:34
7.	"Frontier"	4:29
8.	"Fear, Uncertainty, Doubt"	3:11
9.	"Swim"	4:38
10.	"Evening Shades (Live Training)"	1:33
11.	"Bridge" (with Martine Syms)	2:48
12.	"Godmother" (with Jlin featuring Spawn)	2:30
13.	"Last Gasp"	5:09
Total length:		44:07

== Charts ==
Chart (2019)	Peak position
Scottish Albums (OCC)	99
UK Album Downloads (OCC)	78
UK Independent Albums (OCC)	28
