= Brenna Murphy =

American artist

- Born: 1986 (age 39–40); Edmonds, Washington
- Website: bmruernpnhay.com

Brenna Murphy (born 1986) is an American artist based in Portland, Oregon.

== Early life and education ==
Murphy was born in 1986 in Edmonds, Washington. She holds a BFA from the Pacific Northwest College of Art. In 2014 Murphy spent a five-month creative residency at Eyebeam Art + Technology Center in New York.

== Works ==
Her works combine digital and physical input, combining psychedelic visual forms with three-dimensional objects. Murphy's work has been called strange, but with an "uncanny familiarity." Murphy thinks of herself as a channel that mediates between the digital and the physical. She privileges neither the physical nor the virtual and her sculptures are models of her net-based works as much as her net-based works are models of her sculptures.

Her exhibition Liquid Vehicle Transmitters appeared at the Yerba Buena Center for the Arts in San Francisco, CA in 2013. The exhibit featured prints and physical representations of her internet-based work, forming "an interactive arena of labyrinthine sculptures". An auxiliary installation featured the audiovisual work of MSHR, her collaboration with Birch Cooper. Her work has been exhibited online via the New Museum and in group shows including This is what sculpture looks like, at the Postmasters Gallery in New York City.

Her work has been collected in the book Domain~Lattice.

== Published works ==
- 2015: Domain~Lattice
- 2014: Central Lattice Sequence OCLC 902733775
- 2012: Conversations at the Edge: Fall 2012 Series OCLC 847778823
