= Jay C. Swisher =

American politician

Member of the South Dakota House of Representatives
- In office 1967–1968

Personal details
- Born: June 1, 1921 Vermillion, South Dakota, U.S.
- Died: January 11, 2008 (aged 86) Aberdeen, South Dakota, U.S.
- Party: Republican
- Education: University of South Dakota

Jay C. Swisher (June 1, 1921 – January 11, 2008) was an American politician. He served as a Republican member of the South Dakota House of Representatives.

== Life and career ==
Swisher was born in Vermillion, South Dakota, where attended the University of South Dakota.

Swisher served in the South Dakota House of Representatives from 1967 to 1968.

Swisher died on January 11, 2008 at the age of 86, at Avera St. Luke's Hospital in Aberdeen, South Dakota.
