= Platform (album) =

Studio album by Holly Herndon
- Released: May 19, 2015
- Genre: Electronic; experimental pop; sound collage
- Length: 49:36
- Label: 4AD
- Producer: Holly Herndon; Amnesia Scanner; Mat Dryhurst

Holly Herndon chronology
Chorus (2014)	Platform (2015)	Proto (2019)

Platform is the second studio album by American electronic producer Holly Herndon, released on May 19, 2015, via 4AD. The album received wide critical acclaim upon its release. It is the first commercially released album to include a track intended to trigger autonomous sensory meridian response (ASMR), "Lonely at the Top".

== Critical reception ==
Professional ratings
Aggregate scores
Source	Rating
AnyDecentMusic?	7.9/10
Metacritic	81/100
Review scores
Source	Rating
AllMusic	4/5 stars
The Guardian	4/5 stars
The Irish Times	4/5 stars
NME	8/10
Pitchfork	8.7/10
Q	4/5 stars
Resident Advisor	4.0/5
Rolling Stone	3.5/5 stars
Spin	7/10
Uncut	9/10

According to the review aggregator Metacritic, Platform received "universal acclaim" based on a weighted average score of 81 out of 100 from 23 critic scores.

Winston Cook-Wilson of Pitchfork wrote that "Platform may turn out to be the most thought-provoking experimental electronic music release of the year." Laurie Tuffrey of The Quietus wrote that "in so solidly refuting musical clichés, it can genuinely lay claim to the oft-used description forward-facing." The Guardian's Tshepo Mokoena wrote that "[Herndon] turns cold, lifeless synthetic beats into disconcerting, disjointed rhythms that glitch and collapse on each other", describing the album as "gloriously avant garde and fiercely inventive." Drowned in Sound wrote that "at once Herndon’s most accessible and most adventurous record, this is digital age avant-garde sound art put through a pop prism, and it’s all the more exciting as a result." Heather Phares of AllMusic described the album as "nuanced in how it combines political, technological and structural and ideological concepts." In naming Platform among 2015's best experimental albums, PopMatters wrote: "It’s fair to say if you're unfamiliar with [Herndon's] work, you've never heard anything like it: EDM-streaked sound collage, at once robotic and deeply personal."

=== Accolades ===
Publication	Accolade	Year	Rank
The Guardian	The Best Albums of 2015	2015	24
NME	NME's Albums of the Year 2015	2015	26
Pitchfork	The 50 Best Albums of 2015	2015	39
PopMatters	The 10 Best Experimental Albums of 2015	2015	6
The Wire	Top 50 Releases of 2015	2015	6

== Track listing ==
All songs written and produced by Holly Herndon; except where noted

Platform track listing
No.	Title	Writer(s)	Producer(s)	Length
1.	"Interference"		Holly Herndon, Mat Dryhurst	4:41
2.	"Chorus"		Herndon, Dryhurst	5:55
3.	"Unequal"	Herndon, Colin Self		5:11
4.	"Morning Sun"		Herndon, Dryhurst	5:21
5.	"Locker Leak"	Herndon, Spencer Longo		4:15
6.	"An Exit"	Herndon, Amnesia Scanner	Herndon, Amnesia Scanner	4:58
7.	"Lonely at the Top"	Herndon, Claire Tolan		4:31
8.	"DAO"			4:13
9.	"Home"		Herndon, Dryhurst	5:53
10.	"New Ways to Love"		Herndon, Dryhurst	4:38

== Charts ==
Chart (2015)	Peak position
Belgian Albums (Ultratop Flanders)	183
UK Independent Albums (OCC)	37
US Heatseekers Albums (Billboard)	20
US Top Dance Albums (Billboard)	13
