= RVNG Intl. =

Record label

- Founded: 2003
- Founder: Matt Werth, David Pianka
- Distributor: Secretly Distribution
- Genre: Electronic, experimental
- Country of origin: U.S.
- Location: Brooklyn, New York City
- Official website: www.igetrvng.com

RVNG Intl. is an independent record label based in Brooklyn, New York. Founded in 2003 by Matt Werth, the label is run by Werth and focuses on experimental dance and electronic music, often incorporating avant-garde genres. Release formats include vinyl, CDs, and digital downloads. In 2011, they were named one of the top 50 indie labels in America by Billboard.

In its nascent years, the label released the mix tape series RVNG PRSNTS MX, which was later followed by the Rvng of the Nrds 12" edit series. The ReRVNG archival series and FRKWYS series continue to this day, the latter of which pairs contemporary artists with influential musical pioneers. RVNG Intl. has also released original albums by artists such as Blondes, The Body, Holly Herndon, Julia Holter, Maxmillion Dunbar, and Stellar OM Source. In 2011, the label began releasing vinyl singles under the Beats in Space imprint, which Werth co-owns with Tim Sweeney.

RVNG Intl. was chosen as Resident Advisor's label of the month in January 2014 and Tiny Mix Tapes included RVNG Intl. amongst their favorite labels of 2015.

In 2016 Gideon Coe hosted “Label of Love is RVNG Records” on BBC Radio 6 and The Vinyl Factory featured RVNG as one of the top “20 Record Labels to Follow on Instagram”. The same year Apple Music Experimental Spotlight was on RVNG Intl.

In 2017 RVNG Intl. was listed as one of the best things/happenings of 2017 by The Ransom Note. The label also participated in the Prelude to Sleep series at Moogfest. An LGBTQ benefit compilation entitled “Peaceful Protest” was produced by RVNG Intl. in 2017, while in the same year RVNG pledged all profits from Bandcamp to benefit the ACLU.

The label is also noted for its charitable program Come Mend, in which a portion of record sale profits are donated to causes chosen by the label's artists.

== History ==
=== Background and founding ===
The record label RVNG Intl. was launched in 2003 by Matt Werth. Werth was born in Madison, Wisconsin and spent his formative years in Little Rock, Arkansas. When he was 15, he started the punk 'zine Potluck and took over the record label File Thirteen. First established as what Werth called a "self-reflective journal fanzine" in 1989, File Thirteen was operated by Werth for 8 years.

In 1996, Werth moved to Philadelphia at the age of 18 to play bass for Aspera Ad Astra. While attending Temple University he met Dave Pianka, and together they came up with the idea of RVNG Intl., which was originally an event production company. A mutual friend, Michael Zwizanski, recommended the name, which is an anti-voweled version of "revenge", much in the style of Primal Scream's XTRMNTR, which had come out around the same time.

Werth said that the label's very first mix was intended for event clients, as proof that the label could select and manage good DJs. According to Werth, "Julian Grefe put together the first RVNG mix ―RVNG PRSNTS MX1, which was basically a spray-painted CD in a spray-painted case." Following the initial mix release, MX CDs became an infrequent series of albums from artists such as Tim Sweeney and DJ Twitch. After six years in Philadelphia, Werth moved to Brooklyn in 2002 in order to work at Flyer magazine.

=== First releases ===
The record label RVNG Intl was launched in 2003 by Werth. The label is based in its original location of Brooklyn, New York, Packaging is frequently detailed and unique. For example, a 7" vinyl from Purple Brain came with a hand-crocheted case by designer Dani Griffiths and 1000 prints of Pink Skull's Endless Bummer were letter-pressed with 1000 different variations on the album title phrase.

By 2010, the label had put out two original releases: These Are Powers’ Candyman EP and Pink Skull’s Endless Bummer LP. In 2011, they put out albums by Mirror Mirror and Bronze and were named one of the top 50 indie labels in America by Billboard. In 2012, the label released Blondes by Blondes, which Sean Adams, the founder of Drowned in Sound, lauded with a 10/10 review, praising the music as "bliss" and his "eureka moment."

Other notable albums in 2012 included Ekstasis by Julia Holter, which was named Pitchfork's Best New Music and described as "music that's both haunting and life-affirming, something to make you dream and think", in addition to the critically acclaimed "Movement" by experimental composer Holly Herndon.

In 2013, the label released Swisher by Blondes, and notable albums from Maximillion Dunbar, Blondes, Gardland, and Holly Herndon. As of 2014, RVNG has also released a number of singles and albums from the likes of Bing & Ruth and others. Preserving past works from pioneering musicians is another focus, as exemplified by the release of a double LP set from artist and producer Craig Leon (Nommos and Visiting), titled Anthology of Interplanerary Folk Music Vol. 1 and K. Leimer's A Period of Review.

=== Series ===
Rvng presents Mx series

In 2003 the label first released the Rvng presents Mx CD & vinyl series, which included works from artists such as Tim Sweeney, Justine D and Purple Brain.

RVNG of the NRDS series

Starting in 2006 the label began releasing a vinyl series of disco edits, titled RVNG of the NRDS. The series ran for four years with album artwork from Kevin O’Neill of the independent design firm Will Work For Good. According to a review, the series was "carefully riding the edges of the nu-disco zeitgeist thanks to two obvious factors...the caliber of the artists involved, and the quality of presentation from Will Work For Good, a design agency that has helped form the visual identity of the label across its many releases".

Ten Rvng of The Nrds albums were released, including works by Todd Terje, Greg Wilson, and Pilooski. Each artist also contributed to re-edits of songs by artists such as Wire and R.D. Burman.

FRKWYS series

"The guiding concept behind [FRKWYS] is to bring contemporary electronic artists together with their creative fore-bearers of sorts and allow them to collaborate as inspired."
— Fact Magazine

In 2009, RVNG initiated the FRKWYS series, skipping Volume 1 by initially releasing Frkwys Vol. 2. The first edition featured two remixes of the experimental band Excepter, remixed by Carter Tutti and JG Thirlwell and was praised as "evidence of what can make New York music great when its proprietors are willing to sacrifice expectation for innovation." The series title references Moses Asch's label Folkways.

In May 2010, the label released FRKWYS Vol. 3, an album-length collaboration between Arp and Anthony Moore. Arp reworked both original and unreleased music written by Moore in the 1960s, which was the result of working together at Atlantic Sound's Brooklyn studio in September 2009. FRKWYS Vol. 9 had Los Angeles-based artists Sun Araw and M. Geddes Gengras travel to Jamaica to record with the notable reggae vocal group, The Congos.

Beats in Space series

In 2011, the label began releasing the Beats in Space series of vinyl singles and albums. In 2015, Fact TV presented a documentary on Beats In Space and ranked BIS 25th in their Top 30 album covers of 2015. The BIS Boat Party at Mareh Festival was also a featured pick by Resident Advisor. In 2015 the Beats In Space 15th Anniversary Mix was named compilation of the month by Mixmag.
In 2016 the first issue of Record Magazine featured an interview with Tim Sweeney. Beats In Space also joined Bandcamp with Tim Sweeney being featured on Bandcamp's radio show.
In 2017 a Beats In Space photo book was featured in Record Magazine.

Freedom to Spend imprint

RVNG Intl partnered with Pete Swanson (formerly of Yellow Swans) in 2017 to relaunch his Freedom To Spend label, along with Portland record store owner Jed Bindeman. The label is described as "concerned with autonomous anomalies produced by musicians working within and outside the limits of technology to create intimate art. By virtue of this, the music of Freedom to Spend resonates across a broad sound spectrum, but thrives without rigid regulation." Freedom To Spend has reissued several overlooked and underheard experimental albums from the past few decades. Freedom To Spend was named one of the best electronic labels of 2017 by The Quietus.

=== Events ===
The label has been active in organizing art and music shows, partnering with the likes of the White Columns Gallery in New York City, the Barbican Centre in London, and MoMa PS1′s Summer Warm Up series. RVNG worked with the Unsound Festival in Kraków, Poland, and presented a label showcase in April 2014 at Moogfest in Asheville, North Carolina featuring Blondes, Holly Herndon, and Craig Leon performing "NOMMOS" with the Asheville Symphony. Also in 2014 the 15th Anniversary of Beats In Space was celebrated at Corsica Studios in London. In 2018 RVNG featured artists and collaborated with Le Guess Who music festival. RVNG was also featured at MoMA PS1 Come Together Music Festival and Record Fair.

== Artists ==
=== Current ===
The following artists are current as of August 2018:

- Anna Homler / Breadwoman
- The Body
- Greg Fox
- Helado Negro
- Holly Herndon
- K. Leimer
- Craig Leon
- Pauline Anna Strom
- Sensations' Fix
- Stellar OM Source
- Sugai Ken
- Visible Cloaks
- Oliver Coates
- Kate NV
- Lucrecia Dalt
- Mark Renner
- Emily A. Sprague
- Diatom Deli
- Dylan Moon
- Isik Kural
- M.Sage
- Horse Lords
- Dialect
- Flore Laurentienne
- Satomimagae
- Ka Baird

=== Alumni ===
- Allez-Allez
- Blondes
- Bronze (San Francisco band)
- CFCF
- Clean Plate
- Harald Grosskopf
- Laurel Halo
- Julia Holter
- Lauer (Phillip Lauer)
- The Congos
- David Borden
- James Ferraro
- Sun Araw
- These Are Powers
- Daniel Lopatin
- Regal Regal
- Mirror Mirror
- Pink Skull
- Gardland
- Maxmillion Dunbar
- Mikael Seifu

=== Beats in Space (BIS) artists ===
The following is a complete list (as of August 2018) of artists who have released music as part of the Beats in Space Records series.

- Antenna
- Dukes of Chutney
- E Ruscha V
- Hidden Fees
- Jacques Bon
- Jee Day
- Lauer (Philip Lauer)
- Matt Karmil
- Mount Liberation Unlimited
- Paradis
- Palmbomen II
- Secret Circuit
- Shan
- Tornado Wallace
- Gonno
- Crystal & S. Koshi
- House of Spirits
- Jaakko Eino Kalevi
- Guido w Georges Perin
- T&P
- Shy Layers

=== FRKWYS series ===
The following is an incomplete list of artists who have been included in the FRKWYS series:

- Excepter
- Carter Tutti
- JG Thirlwell
- Jack Dangers
- Arp
- Anthony Moore
- Psychic Ills
- Juan Atkins
- Gibby Haynes
- Hans-Joachim Irmler
- Mirror Mirror
- Alig Fodder's Pranayame
- Stuart Moxham
- Stuart Argabright
- Gretchen Faust
- Rico Conning
- Julianna Barwick
- Ikue Mori
- Samuel Godin
- Blues Control
- Laraaji
- Sun Araw
- M. Geddes Gengras
- The Congos
- Steve Gunn
- Mike Cooper
- David Van Tieghem
- Diamond Terrifier (Sam Hillmer + Max Alper)
- Future Shuttle
- Georgia
- Helado Negro
- Darren Ho
- Eli Keszler
- Hiro Kone
- Megafortress
- Blanche Blanche Blanche
- Maxmillion Dunbar
- Suzanne Ciani
- Kaitlyn Aurelia Smith
- Alan Howarth
- Harald Grosskopf
- Emeralds
- David Borden
- James Ferraro
- Samuel Godin
- Laurel Halo
- Daniel Lopatin
- Robert Aiki Aubrey Lowe
- Ariel Kalma
- Tashi Wada
- Yoshi Wada
- Julia Holter
- Visible Cloaks
- Yoshio Ojima
- Satsuki Shibano
- Ian William Craig
- Daniel Lentz
- Ka Baird
- Pekka Airaksinen
- Psychic Ills
- Gibby Haynes

=== Freedom to Spend series ===
The following is an incomplete list of artists who have been included in the Freedom to Spend imprint:

- Michele Mercure
- Marc Barreca
- Pep Llopis
- Richard Horowitz
- Ursula K. Le Guin & Todd Barton
- Cheri Knight
- Ernest Hood
- Universal Liberation Orchestra
- Rimbarimba
- June Chikuma
- Tiziano Popoli

== Discography ==
=== Main album series ===
Partial RVNG Intl. discography
Cat. #	Yr	Album title	Artist(s)	Notes
RVNGNL01	2009	Endless Bummer	Pink Skull	
RVNGNL02	2010	Candyman	These Are Powers	EP
RVNGNL03	2010	Hideous Racket	Allez-Allez	single
RVNGNL04	2010	The River	CFCF	EP
RVNGNL05	2011	Lover / Hater	Blondes	single
RVNGNL06	2011	Clean Plate	Clean Plate	single
RVNGNL07	2011	Business / Pleasure	Blondes	single
RVNGNL08	2011	Psychic Welfare	Pink Skull	
RVNGNL09	2011	Interiors	Mirror Mirror	
RVNGNL10	2011	Copper	Bronze	
RVNGNL11	2011	Wine / Water	Blondes	single
RVNGNL12	2012	Blondes	Blondes	10/10 review by Drowned in Sound.
RVNGNL14	2012	Ekstasis	Julia Holter	
RVNGNL15	2012	Movement	Holly Herndon	
RVNGNL16	2012	Woo	Maximillion Dunbar	single
RVNGNL17	2012	House of Woo	Maximillion Dunbar	
RVNGNL18	2012	Ekstasis	Julia Holter	expanded edition
RVNGNL19	2013	Elite Excel	Stellar OM Source	single
RVNGNL20	2013	Joy One Mile	Stellar OM Source	
RVNGNL21	2013	Swisher	Blondes	
RVNGNL22	2014	Improvisations	Gardland	live album
RVNGNL23	2014	Syndrome Syndrome	Gardland	
RVNGNL24	2014	"Chorus"	Holly Herndon	single
RVNGNL25	2014	I Shall Die Here	The Body & The Haxan Cloak	
RVNGNL26	2014	Rewire	Blondes	EP
RVNGNL27	2014	Tomorrow Was the Golden Age	Bing & Ruth	
RVNGNL28	2014	Home	Holly Herndon	single
RVNGNL29	2015	Platform	Holly Herndon	
RVNGNL30	2015	Nite-Glo	Stellar OM Source	EP
RVNGNL31	2015	City Lake	Bing & Ruth	
RVNGNL32	2015	Persuasions	Blondes	EP
RVNGNL33	2015	We Are Not the First	Hieroglyphic Being & J.I.T.U. Ahn-Sahm-Buhl	
RVNGNL34	2016	Zelalem	Mikael Seifu	EP
RVNGNL35	2016	The Enlightening Beam of Bobby Brown	Various artists	
RVNGNL36	2016	Catalog Compendium vol. 1	Various artists	
RVNGNL37	2016	Reassemblage	Visible Cloaks	RVNGNL37-1 is Valve / Valve (Revisited) single
RVNGNL38	2017	The Gradual Progression	Greg Fox	
RVNGNL39	2017	Private Energy (Expanded)	Helado Negro	
RVNGNL40	2017	UkabazUmorezU	Sugai Ken	
RVNGNL41	2017	Peaceful Protest	Various Artists	
RVNGNL44	2017	Lex	Visible Cloaks	
RVNGNL43	2017	Shelly's On Zenn-la	Oliver Coates	Album
RVNGNL46	2018	Anticlines	Lucrecia Dalt	Album
RVNGNL50	2018	для FOR	Kate NV	Album
RVNGNL60	2020	Sea to Sea	Sign Libra	
RVNGNL81	2022	Salutations	Various Artists	
RVNGNL83	2022	Volume II	Flore Laurentienne	
RVNGNL84	2022	Advanced Myth	Dialect	
RVNGNL85	2022	¡Ay!	Lucrecia Dalt	
RVNGNL95	2022	Comradely Objects	Horse Lords	
RVNGNL103	2022	bouquet	Kate NV	
RVNGNL82	2023	WOW	Kate NV	
RVNGNL86	2023	soaring wayne phoenix story the earth and sky	Wayne Phoenix	
RVNGNL93	2023	Paradise Crick	M. Sage	
RVNGNL96	2023	Hidden Beauty	Sign Libra	
RVNGNL99	2023	Reflections Vol. 1: Let the Moon Be a Planet	Steve Gunn & David Moore	
RVNGNL105	2023	Tin Iso and the Dawn	Tristan Allen	
RVNGNL106	2023	SEASON: A letter to the future (Original Soundtrack)	Spencer Doran	
RVNGNL108	2023	Live in Leipzig	Horse Lords	
RVNGNL112	2024	Quantum Web	Discovery Zone	

=== RVNG Prsnts Mxs series ===
Selected releases from the RVNG Prsnts Mxs series
Cat#	Yr	Album title	Artist(s)	Notes
Mx1B	2003	Rvng Prsnts Mx1B: Julian S. Process	Julian S. Process	CD, 12" vinyl
Mx2	2004	Rvng Prsnts Mx2: Diabolic & Julian S. Process	Julian S. Process, Diabolic	CD, 12" vinyl
Mx3	2003	Rvng Prsnts Mx3: Tim Sweeney	Tim Sweeney	
Mx4	2005	Rvng Prsnts Mx4: Crazy Rhythms	Crazy Rhythms	
Mx5	2007	Rvng Prsnts Mx5: Justine D	Justine D	
Mx6	2008	Rvng Prsnts Mx6: JD Twitch	JD Twitch	Subtitled 60 Minutes of Fear
Mx6TEN	2008	Rvng Prsnts Mx6TEN: JD Twitch	JD Twitch	Subtitled 10 Inches of Fear
Mx7	2009	Rvng Prsnts Mx7: Purple Brain	Purple Brain	
Mx7SEVEN	2009	Rvng Prsnts Mx7SEVEN: Purple Brain	Purple Brain	

=== RVNG OF THE NRDS series ===
Selected releases from the Rvng Of The Nrds series
Cat. #	Yr	Album title	Artist(s)	Notes
NRDS01	2006	Rvng of the Nrds Vol. 1	The Flying Squad	12" vinyl
NRDS02	2006	Rvng of the Nrds Vol. 2	Betty Botox	12" vinyl
NRDS03	2007	Rvng of the Nrds Vol. 3	Mock & Toof	12" vinyl
NRDS04	2008	Rvng of the Nrds Vol. 4	Lovefingers	12" vinyl
NRDS05	2008	Rvng of the Nrds Vol. 5	Wade Nichols	12" vinyl
NRDS06	2008	Rvng of the Nrds Vol. 6	Jacques Renault	12" vinyl
NRDS07	2008	Rvng of the Nrds Vol. 7	Greg Wilson	12" vinyl
NRDS08	2009	Rvng of the Nrds Vol. 8	In Flagranti	12" vinyl
NRDS09	2009	Rvng of the Nrds Vol. 9	Jackpot	12" vinyl
NRDS10	2010	Rvng of the Nrds Vol. 10	Pilooski	12" vinyl

=== FRKWYS Series ===
Selected releases from the FRKWYS Series
Cat. #	Yr	Album title	Artist(s)	Notes
FRKWYS02	2009	FRKWYS Vol. 2	Carter Tutti, JG Thirlwell	12" + MP3
FRKWYS03	2010	FRKWYS Vol. 3	Arp, Anthony Moore	12" + MP3
FRKWYS04	2010	FRKWYS Vol. 4	Psychic Ills	12" + MP3
FRKWYS05	2011	FRKWYS Vol. 5	Mirror Mirror	12" + MP3
FRKWYS06	2011	FRKWYS Vol. 6	Julianna Barwick, Ikue Mori	
FRKWYS07	2011	FRKWYS Vol. 7	David Borden, James Ferraro, Sam Godin, Laurel Halo, Daniel Lopatin	
FRKWYS08	2011	FRKWYS Vol. 8	Blues Control, Laraaji	
FRKWYS09	2012	FRKWYS Vol. 9	Sun Araw, M. Geddes Gengras and The Congos	ICON GIVE THANK
FRKWYS10	2013	FRKWYS Vol. 10	David Van Tieghem x Ten	Fits & Starts
FRKWYS11	2014	FRKWYS Vol. 11	Steve Gunn & Mike Cooper	Cantos de Lisboa
FRKWYS12	2015	FRKWYS Vol. 12	Robert Aiki Aubrey Lowe & Ariel Kalma	We Know Each Other Somehow
FRKWYS13	2016	FRKWYS Vol. 13	Kaitlyn Aurelia Smith & Suzanne Ciani	Sunergy
FRKWYS14	2018	FRKWYS Vol. 14	Tashi Wada with Yoshi Wada and Friends	Nue
FRKWYS15	2019	FRKWYS Vol. 15	Visible Cloaks, Yoshio Ojima & Satsuki Shibano	serenitatem
FRKWYS16	2020	FRKWYS Vol. 16	Ian William Craig & Daniel Lentz	In a Word

=== Beats in Space series ===
Selected releases from the BIS series
Cat#	Yr	Single title	Artist(s)	Notes
BIS001	2011	"Parfait Tirage"	Paradis	12", mp3
BIS002	2012	"Nebula Sphynx"	Secret Circuit	
BIS003	2012	"Hemisphere"	Paradis	
BIS004	2012	"Macsat Ring Down"	Lauer	
BIS005	2013	"Afterlife"	Secret Circuit	
BIS006	2013	Tactile Galactics	Secret Circuit	
BIS007	2013	"Sum of Love"	Jee Day	
BIS008	2013	Desperate Pleasures EP	Tornado Wallace	
BIS009	2013	"The Noughties"	Gonno	
BIS010	2013	"Break the Dawn"	Crystal & S. Koshi	
BIS011	2014	Domino EP	Dukes of Chutney	
BIS012	2014	So What EP	Hidden Fees	
BIS013	2014	"Holding On"	House of Spirits	
BIS014	2014	"So You Say"	Matt Karmil	
BIS015	2014	"Yin Yang Theatre"	Jaakko Eino Kalevi	
BIS016	2014	"Gin 'n' Tears"	Guiddo feat. Georges Perin	
BIS017	2014	"Hands & Feet"	Lauer	
BIS018	2015	"Kangaroo Ground / Ferntree Gully"	Tornado Wallace	
BIS019	2015	Palmbomen II	Palmbomen II	
BIS020	2016	"Shoot the Freak"	T & P	
BIS021	2016	Beats in Space 15th Anniversary Mix	Tim Sweeney	Mix of previous releases
BIS022	2016	BIS: 001–020	Various artists	Collection of previous releases
BIS023	2016	Primavera EP	Antenna	
BIS024	2016	"Memories of Cindy Pt. 1"	Palmbomen II	
BIS025	2016	"(Eerie) For Your Love"	Mount Liberation Unlimited	
BIS026	2016	"Good to Me"	Shan	
BIS027	2017	"Dawning Light"	Jacques Bon	
BIS028	2017	"Memories of Cindy Pt. 2"	Palmbomen II	
BIS029	2018	"Memories of Cindy Pt. 3"	Palmbomen II	
BIS031	2018	Memories of Cindy	Palmbomen II	
BIS032	2018	Who Are You	E Ruscha V	
BIS032	2018	Midnight Markers	Shy Layers	
BIS032	2018	Woo are you	E Ruscha V. And Woo	

=== RERVNG series ===
Selected releases from the RERVNG series
Cat#	Yr	Album title	Artist(s)	Notes
RERVNG01	2011	Synthesist / Re-Synthesist	Harald Grosskopf / Various artists	
RERVNG02	2012	Music Is Painting in the Air (1974-1977)	Sensations' Fix	
RERVNG03	2014	A Period of Review (1975-1983)	K. Leimer	
RERVNG04	2014	Anthology of Interplanetary Folk Music vol. 1: Nommos / Visiting	Craig Leon	
RERVNG05	2014	An Evolutionary Music (1972–1979)	Ariel Kalma	
RERVNG07	2015	Artificial Dance	Savant	
RERVNG06	2016	Breadwoman & Other Tales	Anna Homler and Steve Moshier	
RERVNG08	2016	Tumblers from the Vault (1970–1972)	Syrinx	
RERVNG10	2017	Trans-Millenia Music	Pauline Anna Strom	
RERVNG11	2018	Few Traces	Mark Renner	

=== Commend See series ===
Selected releases from the Commend See series
Cat#	Yr	Album title	Artist(s)	Notes
CMMND001	2016	For Haku	RAMZi	
CMMND002	2016	Water Falls Into a Blank	7FO	
CMMND003	2017	Parcel	Melanie Velarde	

=== Freedom to Spend series ===
Selected releases from the Freedom to Spend series
Cat#	Yr	Album title	Artist(s)	Notes
FTS001	2017	Eye Chant	Michele Mercure	
FTS002	2017	Music Works for Industry	Marc Barreca	
FTS003	2017	Poiemusia La Nau Dels Argonautes	Pep Llopis	
FTS004	2017	Eros in Arabia	Richard Horowitz	
FTS009	2018	Music and Poetry of the Kesh	Ursula K. Le Guin & Todd Barton	

== See also ==
- List of independent record labels
