= List of 2017 albums =

The following is a list of albums, EPs, and mixtapes released in 2017. These albums are (1) original, i.e. excluding reissues, remasters, and compilations of previously released recordings, and (2) notable, defined as having received significant coverage from reliable sources independent of the subject.

For additional information about bands formed, reformed, disbanded, or on hiatus, for deaths of musicians, and for links to musical awards, see 2017 in music.

== First quarter ==
=== January ===
List of albums released in January 2017
Go to: January | February | March | April | May | June | July | August | September | October | November | December | Back to top
Release date	Artist	Album	Genre	Label	Ref.
January 1	Brian Eno	Reflection	Ambient	Warp	
January 1	Chief Keef	Two Zero One Seven	Drill	Glo Gang, RBC Records, eOne Music	
January 2	AOA	Angel's Knock	K-pop, electropop, dance-pop	FNC, LOEN	
January 2	S.E.S.	Remember	R&B, new jack swing, ballad	SM, KT	
January 3	Akdong Musician	Winter	K-pop, folk	YG, KT	
January 3	April	Prelude	K-pop, synth-pop, R&B	DSP, LOEN	
January 4	Pink Guy	Pink Season	Comedy hip-hop	Pink Records	
January 6	Dropkick Murphys	11 Short Stories of Pain & Glory	Celtic punk, folk punk	Born & Bred Records	
January 6	Gone Is Gone	Echolocation		Black Dune, Rise	
January 6	Halestorm	Reanimate 3.0: The Covers EP	Hard rock	Atlantic	
January 6	Jipsta	Ban2oozle	Dance, hip-hop, pop	Bandoozle Beatz	
January 6	NCT 127	Limitless	K-pop, R&B, dance-pop	SM, KT	
January 6	Sundara Karma	Youth Is Only Ever Fun in Retrospect	Indie rock, new wave, synth-pop	Chess Club Records	
January 6	You Me at Six	Night People	Hard rock, rock and roll	Virgin, Prospect Park, BMG	
January 8	David Bowie	No Plan		Columbia, Sony Music	
January 11	Band-Maid	Just Bring It	Hard rock, heavy metal	Nippon Crown, JPU	
January 11	Hello Venus	Mystery of Venus	Swing, R&B, hip-hop	Fantagio	
January 11	One Ok Rock	Ambitions	Alternative rock	A-Sketch, Amuse, Inc., Fueled by Ramen	
January 12	Pabllo Vittar	Vai Passar Mal	Pop	BMT	
January 12	The Teskey Brothers	Half Mile Harvest		Half Mile Harvest Recordings, Decca, Ivy League	
January 13	Bonobo	Migration	Electronic, downtempo	Ninja Tune	
January 13	Code Orange	Forever	Metalcore	Roadrunner	
January 13	Colony House	Only the Lonely	Rock, blues	RCA	
January 13	Danny Gokey	Rise	CCM	BMG	
January 13	The Flaming Lips	Oczy Mlody	Neo-psychedelia, electronic, experimental rock	Warner Bros., Bella Union	
January 13	Flo Morrissey and Matthew E. White	Gentlewoman, Ruby Man	Indie rock	Glassnote	
January 13	Gotthard	Silver	Hard rock	G Records	
January 13	Grave Digger	Healed by Metal	Heavy metal, power metal	Napalm	
January 13	Grayson/Reed	Walk	Christian pop, Christian rock, worship	Centricity	
January 13	John Abercrombie Quartet	Up and Coming	Jazz	ECM	
January 13	Julie Byrne	Not Even Happiness	Contemporary folk	Ba Da Bing, Basin Rock	
January 13	The McClymonts	Endless	Country	Universal Music	
January 13	Natalie Hemby	Puxico	Country	GetWrucke Productions	
January 13	Pain of Salvation	In the Passing Light of Day	Progressive rock, progressive metal	Inside Out	
January 13	PnB Rock	GTTM: Goin Thru the Motions	Hip-hop	Empire, Atlantic	
January 13	The Regrettes	Feel Your Feelings Fool!	Punk rock	Warner Music	
January 13	Rick Wakeman	Piano Portraits	Classical	Universal Music	
January 13	Sean Danielsen	Product of Isolation	Alternative rock		
January 13	Sepultura	Machine Messiah	Groove metal, thrash metal, death metal	Nuclear Blast	
January 13	Wiley	Godfather	Grime	Chasing The Art	
January 13	The xx	I See You	Indie rock, dream pop, alternative dance	Young Turks	
January 17	CLC	Crystyle	Dance pop, EDM, trap	Cube, CJ E&M Music	
January 17	Jessie James Decker	Gold	Country pop	Epic	
January 17	Joan of Arc	He's Got the Whole This Land Is Your Land in His Hands	Experimental rock	Joyful Noise	
January 17	Seohyun	Don't Say No	Dance pop, R&B	SM, KT	
January 18	E-Girls	E.G. Crazy	J-pop, EDM, dance	Rhythm Zone	
January 18	Ok Taec-yeon	Taecyeon Special: Winter Hitori	J-pop	Epic Japan	
January 20	AFI	AFI	Punk rock, post-punk	Concord	
January 20	As It Is	okay.	Pop-punk	Fearless	
January 20	As Lions	Selfish Age	Rock	Better Noise	
January 20	Austra	Future Politics	Synth-pop, new wave, house	Domino	
January 20	Cherry Glazerr	Apocalipstick	Indie rock	Secretly Canadian	
January 20	Dune Rats	The Kids Will Know It's Bullshit	Pop-punk	Ratbag Records	
January 20	Firewind	Immortals	Power metal	Century Media	
January 20	Foxygen	Hang	Baroque pop, glam rock	Jagjaguwar	
January 20	Frank Carter & The Rattlesnakes	Modern Ruin	Alternative rock, hardcore punk, punk rock	International Death Cult	
January 20	J-Ax and Fedez	Comunisti col Rolex	Pop-rap	Sony Music	
January 20	Jacob Sartorius	The Last Text EP	Pop	T3 Music Group	
January 20	John Mayer	The Search for Everything: Wave One	Blues, pop, rock	Columbia	
January 20	Kasey Chambers	Dragonfly	Country	Warner Bros., Sugar Hill	
January 20	Loyle Carner	Yesterday's Gone	Hip-hop	Virgin EMI	
January 20	Menace Beach	Lemon Memory	Surf punk, indie rock	Memphis	
January 20	Mick Harvey	Intoxicated Women		Mute	
January 20	Mike Oldfield	Return to Ommadawn	Progressive rock, world music, folk	Virgin EMI	
January 20	Nicky Jam	Fénix	Reggaeton	Pina Records	
January 20	Palisades	Palisades	Electronicore	Rise	
January 20	Renée Fleming	Distant Light	Classical	Decca	
January 20	Starset	Vessels	Hard rock, progressive rock, electronic rock	Razor & Tie	
January 20	Uniform	Wake in Fright	Noise rock, industrial rock, industrial metal	Sacred Bones	
January 20	William Basinski	A Shadow in Time	Ambient, drone	2062 Records, Temporary Residence	
January 23	Neil Cicierega	Mouth Moods			
January 24	Suzy	Yes? No?	K-pop, R&B, soul	JYP, KT	
January 27	Allison Crutchfield	Tourist in This Town	Synth-pop, pop rock, indie rock	Merge	
January 27	Annihilator	Triple Threat	Thrash metal	UDR Music	
January 27	Aquilo	Silhouettes	Electronica, dream pop	Island	
January 27	Barry Zito	No Secrets	Country	Childlike Productions	
January 27	Bell Biv DeVoe	Three Stripes	Hip-hop, R&B	eOne Music	
January 27	Brantley Gilbert	The Devil Don't Sleep	Country rock, rock	Valory Music	
January 27	Brian & Jenn Johnson	After All These Years	Worship, CCM	Bethel Music	
January 27	Chris Thile, Brad Mehldau	Chris Thile & Brad Mehldau		Nonesuch	
January 27	Cloud Nothings	Life Without Sound	Indie rock, post-hardcore, noise rock	Carpark, Wichita	
January 27	Deaf Havana	All These Countless Nights	Rock	SO Recordings	
January 27	Ellie Holcomb	Red Sea Road	CCM	Full Heart	
January 27	Gabriel Garzón-Montano	Jardín	R&B, Alternative R&B	Stones Throw	
January 27	Japandroids	Near to the Wild Heart of Life	Indie rock, noise pop, garage punk	Anti-	
January 27	John Craigie	No Rain, No Rose	Folk, indie folk, Americana	Zabriskie Point Records	
January 27	Kehlani	SweetSexySavage	Alternative R&B	Atlantic	
January 27	Kellermensch	Goliath	Experimental rock, art rock	Universal, Persona Non Grata	
January 27	Kreator	Gods of Violence	Thrash metal	Nuclear Blast	
January 27	Lauren Alaina	Road Less Traveled	Country	Mercury Nashville, Interscope, 19	
January 27	Lucy Spraggan	I Hope You Don't Mind Me Writing	Pop	CTRL Records	
January 27	Matt Martians	The Drum Chord Theory	Trip hop, neo soul, experimental hip-hop	Three Quarter	
January 27	Matthew Shipp Trio	Piano Song	Jazz	Thirsty Ear	
January 27	Migos	Culture	Hip-hop, trap	300, Atlantic, Because Music	
January 27	P.O.S	Chill, Dummy	Hip-hop, alternative hip-hop	Doomtree	
January 27	Priests	Nothing Feels Natural	Punk rock	Sister Polygon	
January 27	Shinee	Five	Pop, pop rock, teen pop	EMI Records Japan	
January 27	Stephen Pearcy	Smash		Frontiers Music SRL	
January 27	Train	A Girl, a Bottle, a Boat	Pop	Columbia	
January 27	T.S.O.L.	The Trigger Complex	Gothic rock, hard rock, punk rock	Rise	
January 27	Ty Segall	Ty Segall	Garage rock	Drag City	
January 27	Whitney Rose	South Texas Suite	Country	Six Shooter, Thirty Tigers	
January 27	Xandria	Theater of Dimensions	Symphonic metal, power metal	Napalm	
January 30	Riff Raff	Aquaberry Aquarius	Hip-hop	BMG, Warner, ADA	
January 31	Emika	Melanfonie		Emika Records	

=== February ===
List of albums released in February 2017
Go to: January | February | March | April | May | June | July | August | September | October | November | December | Back to top
Release date	Artist	Album	Genre	Label	Ref.
February 1	Red Velvet	Rookie	Pop	SM	
February 1	Zion.T	OO	R&B, soul	The Black Label	
February 3	Big Sean	I Decided.	Hip-hop	GOOD, Def Jam	
February 3	Big Wreck	Grace Street	Rock	Anthem, Warner Music Canada	
February 3	Black Star Riders	Heavy Fire	Hard rock	Nuclear Blast	
February 3	Craig Taborn	Daylight Ghosts	Jazz	ECM	
February 3	Dave Hause	Bury Me in Philly	Rock, alternative rock, heartland rock	Rise	
February 3	Elbow	Little Fictions	Alternative rock	Polydor	
February 3	G4	G4 Love Songs	Operatic pop	Amick Productions	
February 3	Homeshake	Fresh Air	R&B, Synth-pop	Royal Mountain, Sinderlyn	
February 3	Iron Reagan	Crossover Ministry	Crossover thrash	Relapse	
February 3	Julian Cope	Drunken Songs	Rock	Head Heritage	
February 3	Kari Jobe	The Garden	Worship	Sparrow, KAJE	
February 3	The Knocks	Testify EP	EDM, nu-disco, dance-pop	Big Beat, Neon Gold	
February 3	Lower Than Atlantis	Safe in Sound	Rock	Easy Life Records	
February 3	The Menzingers	After the Party	Punk rock, heartland rock	Epitaph	
February 3	Moon Duo	Occult Architecture Vol. 1		Sacred Bones	
February 3	Ocean Grove	The Rhapsody Tapes	Nu metal, hardcore punk, grunge	UNFD	
February 3	Reba McEntire	Sing It Now: Songs of Faith & Hope	Country, gospel	Nash Icon, Rockin' R Records, Capitol CMG	
February 3	RuPaul	Remember Me: Essential, Vol. 1		RuCo Inc.	
February 3	Sampha	Process	Electronic	Young Turks	
February 3	Sofía Reyes	Louder!	Latin pop	Warner Music Latina	
February 3	Surfer Blood	Snowdonia	Indie rock, surf music	Joyful Noise	
February 3	Syd	Fin	Alternative R&B	Columbia	
February 3	Wyclef Jean	J'ouvert	Hip-hop	Heads Music	
February 8	Kyuhyun	One Voice	J-pop	Avex Trax, SM	
February 8	Takuto	Scapegoat	J-pop, rock	Being Inc.	
February 9	Two-9	FRVR	Hip-hop	EarDrummers, Interscope	
February 10	Aaron Carter	Love	Pop, electronic	Sony Music, Z Entertainment	
February 10	Adam Brand	Get On Your Feet	Country	Adam Brand, ABC Music, Universal Music Australia	
February 10	Andrew McMahon in the Wilderness	Zombies on Broadway	Pop	Vanguard	
February 10	Blackfield	Blackfield V	Art rock, alternative rock	Kscope	
February 10	Brett Young	Brett Young	Country, contemporary folk	Big Machine Label Group	
February 10	Carousel Kings	Charm City	Pop-punk	Victory	
February 10	Chuck Prophet	Bobby Fuller Died for Your Sins	Rock	Yep Roc	
February 10	Ermal Meta	Vietato morire	Pop	Mescal	
February 10	Jesca Hoop	Memories Are Now		Sub Pop	
February 10	Jess & Matt	Belmont Street	Pop	Sony Music Australia	
February 10	Lupe Fiasco	Drogas Light	Hip-hop	1st & 15th, Thirty Tigers	
February 10	Michael Bolton	Songs of Cinema	Pop	Frontiers	
February 10	Mother Mother	No Culture	Indie rock	Universal Music Canada, Def Jam	
February 10	Nicolas Kummert	La diversité	Jazz	Edition	
February 10	Nines	One Foot Out	British hip-hop	XL	
February 10	Oleta Adams	Third Set	Jazz		
February 10	Overkill	The Grinding Wheel	Thrash metal	eOne Music, Nuclear Blast	
February 10	Quelle Chris	Being You Is Great, I Wish I Could Be You More Often	Underground hip-hop	MMG	
February 10	Rag'n'Bone Man	Human	Soul, blues	Columbia, Sony Music	
February 10	Rosalía	Los ángeles	Nuevo flamenco	Universal Music Spain	
February 10	Save Ferris	Checkered Past	Ska punk	Withyn Records	
February 10	Steamchicken	Look Both Ways	Jazz, roots, cèilidh	Chicken Records	
February 10	Thievery Corporation	The Temple of I & I	Electronic	ESL Music	
February 10	Thunder	Rip It Up	Hard rock	earMUSIC	
February 10	Thundamentals	Everyone We Know		High Depth	
February 10	Tinariwen	Elwan	African blues, desert blues, world	Anti-, Epitaph	
February 10	Una Healy	The Waiting Game	Pop, folk, country	Decca, Universal	
February 10	Various artists	Fifty Shades Darker: Original Motion Picture Soundtrack	Electro, R&B, electropop	Republic	
February 10	Young Bleed	Livin'	Hip-hop	Trap Door Entertainment, Team Mashn' Entertainment	
February 13	Bohemia	Skull & Bones: The Final Chapter	Desi hip-hop	T-Series	
February 14	Keke Wyatt	Keke Covers	R&B	Aratek Entertainment	
February 15	Mai Kuraki	Smile	J-pop, R&B, rock	Northern Music	
February 16	Jovi	16 Wives	Mboko	New Bell Music	
February 16	Maggie Rogers	Now That the Light Is Fading	Folktronica	Capitol, Debay Sounds	
February 17	Alison Krauss	Windy City	Country	Capitol	
February 17	Amy Macdonald	Under Stars	Pop rock, soft rock	Melodramatic, Mercury, Vertigo	
February 17	Animal Collective	The Painters	Experimental pop	Domino	
February 17	Battle Beast	Bringer of Pain	Heavy metal, power metal	Nuclear Blast	
February 17	Bebe Rexha	All Your Fault: Pt. 1	Pop	Warner Bros.	
February 17	Bing & Ruth	No Home of the Mind		4AD	
February 17	Blutengel	Leitbild	Futurepop, dark wave	Out of Line	
February 17	Busby Marou	Postcards from the Shell House		Warner Music Australia	
February 17	Charlie Wilson	In It to Win It	R&B	RCA	
February 17	The Courtneys	The Courtneys II		Flying Nun	
February 17	Dutch Uncles	Big Balloon	Art pop, post-punk	Memphis Industries	
February 17	Edenbridge	The Great Momentum	Symphonic metal, power metal	SPV/Steamhammer	
February 17	Eisley	I'm Only Dreaming	Indie pop	Equal Vision	
February 17	Fat Joe and Remy Ma	Plata O Plomo	Hip-hop	Terror Squad, Mr. 305 Inc., Empire	
February 17	Flume	Skin Companion EP 2	Electronic	Mom + Pop, Future Classic	
February 17	Frontier Ruckus	Enter the Kingdom	Folk rock, indie pop	Sitcom Universe, Loose	
February 17	Future	Future	Hip-hop, trap	A1, Freebandz, Epic	
February 17	Jens Lekman	Life Will See You Now	Indie rock	Secretly Canadian	
February 17	Jidenna	The Chief	Hip-hop	Wondaland, Epic, Sony Music	
February 17	Joel Plaskett and Bill Plaskett	Solidarity	Folk rock	Pheromone	
February 17	Jonwayne	Rap Album Two	Hip-hop	Authors Recording Company	
February 17	Katie Noonan and Karin Schaupp	Songs of the Latin Skies	Jazz, classical, pop	Kin Music	
February 17	Massive Ego	Beautiful Suicide	Darkwave, electronic	Out of Line	
February 17	Nikki Lane	Highway Queen	Americana, outlaw country	New West	
February 17	Once Human	Evolution	Melodic death metal	earMUSIC, eOne Music	
February 17	The Orwells	Terrible Human Beings	Garage punk, garage rock	Canvasback Music, Atlantic	
February 17	The Raveonettes	2016 Atomized	Shoegaze, noise pop, post-punk revival	The Beat Dies	
February 17	Ryan Adams	Prisoner	Alternative country, rock	PAX AM, Blue Note	
February 17	Son Volt	Notes of Blue	Blues	Transmit Sound	
February 17	Strand of Oaks	Hard Love	Indie rock	Dead Oceans	
February 17	Sun Kil Moon	Common as Light and Love Are Red Valleys of Blood	Folk rock, indie folk, indie rock	Caldo Verde	
February 17	Vant	Dumb Blood	Indie rock, punk rock	Parlophone	
February 17	Visible Cloaks	Reassemblage	New-age, ambient, vaporwave	RVNG Intl.	
February 17	William Control	The Black	Darkwave, Synth-pop	Control Records	
February 20	Twice	Twicecoaster: Lane 2	K-pop, dance	JYP, KT	
February 21	Dirty Projectors	Dirty Projectors	Art pop, experimental rock	Domino	
February 21	Roc Marciano	Rosebudd's Revenge	Hip-hop	Marci Enterprises	
February 24	Aaron Watson	Vaquero	Country	Big Label Records	
February 24	All Them Witches	Sleeping Through the War		New West	
February 24	Bea Miller	Chapter One: Blue	Pop	Hollywood	
February 24	Born of Osiris	The Eternal Reign	Deathcore, progressive metal	Sumerian	
February 24	Crystal Fairy	Crystal Fairy	Rock, alternative rock, hard rock	Ipecac	
February 24	Dams of the West	Youngish American	Alternative rock	30th Century Records, Columbia	
February 24	Emel Mathlouthi	Ensen	Electronic	Partisan	
February 24	The Feelies	In Between	Rock	Bar/None	
February 24	Future	Hndrxx	Hip-hop, trap	A1, Freebandz, Epic	
February 24	Hippo Campus	Landmark	Indie pop	Grand Jury Records	
February 24	Holy Holy	Paint		Wonderlick Entertainment	
February 24	Immolation	Atonement	Death metal	Nuclear Blast	
February 24	John Mayer	The Search for Everything: Wave Two	Blues, pop, rock	Columbia, Sony Music	
February 24	King Gizzard & the Lizard Wizard	Flying Microtonal Banana	Psychedelic rock, acid rock, krautrock	Flightless, ATO, Heavenly	
February 24	Little Big Town	The Breaker	Country	Capitol Nashville	
February 24	Los Campesinos!	Sick Scenes	Indie rock	Wichita	
February 24	Michele Bravi	Anime di carta	Pop, electropop	Universal Music Italy	
February 24	Mike Tramp	Maybe Tomorrow	Soft rock, melodic rock	Mighty Music, Target Records	
February 24	Nav	Nav	Hip-hop, trap, R&B	XO, Republic	
February 24	Oddisee	The Iceberg	Hip-hop	Mello Music Group	
February 24	Old 97's	Graveyard Whistling	Country	ATO	
February 24	Peter Silberman	Impermanence	Anti-, Transgressive	Slowcore, ambient, indie rock	
February 24	Pissed Jeans	Why Love Now	Post-punk, heavy metal, noise punk	Sub Pop	
February 24	Place Vendome	Close to the Sun	Hard rock	Frontiers	
February 24	Power Trip	Nightmare Logic	Thrash metal, crossover thrash, hardcore punk	Southern Lord	
February 24	Prince Royce	Five	Bachata, pop, R&B	Sony Music Latin	
February 24	Rhiannon Giddens	Freedom Highway	Americana, folk, old-time	Nonesuch	
February 24	Sanctuary	Inception	Thrash metal, power metal	Century Media	
February 24	Sofia Ellar	Seis peniques	Pop, folk	Sofia Ellar S.L	
February 24	Steel Panther	Lower the Bar	Glam metal, heavy metal, comedy rock	Kobalt	
February 24	Stormzy	Gang Signs & Prayer	Grime, R&B, UK rap	#Merky Records, Warner, ADA	
February 24	Suicide Silence	Suicide Silence	Nu metal, alternative metal, metalcore	Nuclear Blast	
February 24	Taylor Bennett	Restoration of an American Idol	Hip-hop		
February 24	Thundercat	Drunk	Jazz fusion, electronic, R&B	Brainfeeder	
February 24	Vagabon	Infinite Worlds	Indie rock	Father/Daughter	
February 24	Xiu Xiu	Forget	Rock	Polyvinyl	
February 26	Lil Uzi Vert	Luv Is Rage 1.5	Hip-hop, trap		
February 26	Lovelyz	R U Ready?	Bubblegum pop, R&B	Woollim Entertainment, LOEN	
February 28	Taeyeon	My Voice	Pop, R&B, PBR&B	SM, KT	

=== March ===
List of albums released in March 2017
Go to: January | February | March | April | May | June | July | August | September | October | November | December | Back to top
Release date	Artist	Album	Genre	Label	Ref.
March 3	Blanck Mass	World Eater	Electronic	Sacred Bones	
March 3	Caro Emerald	Emerald Island	Exotica	Grandmono	
March 3	deadmau5	Stuff I Used to Do	Progressive house, electro house, downtempo	mau5trap	
March 3	Ed Sheeran	÷	Pop	Asylum	
March 3	Emmure	Look at Yourself	Nu metalcore, djent	SharpTone	
March 3	Grandaddy	Last Place	Indie rock, indie pop	30th Century Records	
March 3	Jona	Jona	R&B, pop	Star Music	
March 3	Joy Denalane	Gleisdreieck	R&B, PBR&B	Nesola	
March 3	Khalid	American Teen	R&B, Alternative R&B	Right Hand, RCA	
March 3	Lusine	Sensorimotor		Ghostly International	
March 3	Mallory Knox	Wired	Alternative rock	RCA	
March 3	Matmatah	Plates Coutures	French rock	La Ouache Production	
March 3	Methyl Ethel	Everything Is Forgotten	Rock	4AD	
March 3	Minus the Bear	Voids	Math rock, experimental rock, progressive rock	Suicide Squeeze	
March 3	The Real McKenzies	Two Devils Will Talk	Celtic punk	Fat Wreck Chords	
March 3	Sleaford Mods	English Tapas	Post-punk	Rough Trade	
March 3	Temples	Volcano	Psychedelic pop	Heavenly, Fat Possum	
March 3	Tokio Hotel	Dream Machine	Electropop, Synth-pop	Starwatch Music	
March 3	Why?	Moh Lhean	Indie pop, hip-hop	Joyful Noise	
March 3	Within the Ruins	Halfway Human	Deathcore, progressive metal, metalcore	eOne	
March 3	X Japan	We Are X	Heavy metal, power metal, speed metal	Legacy	
March 6	BtoB	Feel'eM	K-pop, dance-pop	Cube Entertainment, LOEN	
March 6	GFriend	The Awakening	K-pop	Source Music, LOEN	
March 7	Brave Girls	Rollin'		Brave Entertainment	
March 7	Hyperbubble	Western Ware	Synth-pop, electropop	Fellowshipwreck	
March 8	Koda Kumi	W Face: Inside/Outside	J-pop, hip-hop	Rhythm Zone	
March 10	Black Map	In Droves	Hard rock, alternative rock	eOne Music, SPV	
March 10	Bliss n Eso	Off the Grid	Hip-hop	Illusive Sounds	
March 10	Bush	Black and White Rainbows	Alternative rock	Zuma Rock Records	
March 10	Can't Swim	Fail You Again	Post-hardcore, emo	Pure Noise	
March 10	Charli XCX	Number 1 Angel	Bubblegum pop, hip-hop	Vroom Vroom	
March 10	Circa Waves	Different Creatures	Alternative rock, indie rock	Virgin EMI	
March 10	Darkest Hour	Godless Prophets & the Migrant Flora	Metalcore, melodic death metal	Southern Lord	
March 10	Greg Graffin	Millport	Country rock, folk, roots rock	Anti-	
March 10	Havok	Conformicide	Thrash metal	Century Media	
March 10	Hurray for the Riff Raff	The Navigator	Americana, folk	ATO	
March 10	Idles	Brutalism	Punk rock	Partisan	
March 10	JID	The Never Story	Hip-hop	Dreamville, Interscope	
March 10	Jay Som	Everybody Works	Bedroom pop	Double Denim, Polyvinyl	
March 10	Jerry Garcia Band	Garcia Live Volume Eight	Rock, rhythm and blues	Round, ATO	
March 10	Josh Turner	Deep South	Country	MCA Nashville	
March 10	Laura Marling	Semper Femina	Folk, folk rock, alternative rock	More Alarming Records	
March 10	The Magnetic Fields	50 Song Memoir	Indie pop	Nonesuch	
March 10	The Motels	If Not Now Then When	New wave	Sunset Blvd Records	
March 10	Murs	Captain California	Hip-hop	Strange Music	
March 10	Nick Murphy	Missing Link	Experimental pop	Downtown	
March 10	Smile Empty Soul	Rarities	Alternative rock, post-grunge	MRAfia	
March 10	Shobaleader One	Elektrac	Electronic	Warp	
March 10	Sunny Sweeney	Trophy	Country	Aunt Daddy	
March 10	The Shins	Heartworms	Indie pop	Columbia	
March 10	Spectres	Condition		Sonic Cathedral	
March 10	Tennis	Yours Conditionally	Indie rock, indie pop	Mutually Detrimental	
March 10	Valerie June	The Order of Time	Americana, soul, blues	Concord, Caroline	
March 10	Various artists	Beauty and the Beast: Original Motion Picture Soundtrack		Walt Disney	
March 10	Vera Lynn	Her Greatest from Abbey Road	Pop	Parlophone, Warner Music	
March 10	Western Addiction	Tremulous	Punk rock, hardcore punk	Fat Wreck Chords	
March 10	Your Old Droog	Packs	Hip-hop	Droog Recordings, Fat Beats	
March 10	Yvonne Catterfeld	Guten Morgen Freiheit	Pop	Veritable Records	
March 13	Got7	Flight Log: Arrival	K-pop, hip-hop, R&B	JYP	
March 13	Loona 1/3	Love & Live	K-pop, pop, ballad	Blockberry Creative, CJ E&M	
March 14	Smino	Blkswn	Neo soul, hip-hop, R&B	Zero Fatigue, Downtown	
March 15	Jean-Michel Blais and CFCF	Cascades	Ambient, postminimalism, neoclassical	Arts & Crafts	
March 16	Chloe x Halle	The Two of Us	R&B	Parkwood, Columbia	
March 17	Anohni	Paradise	Electronic	Secretly Canadian, Rough Trade	
March 17	The Charm The Fury	The Sick, Dumb & Happy	Nu metal, groove metal	Nuclear Blast	
March 17	Conor Oberst	Salutations	Folk, folk rock, Americana	Nonesuch	
March 17	Depeche Mode	Spirit	Electronic	Columbia	
March 17	Elevation Worship	There Is a Cloud	Worship, CCM, Christian rock	Elevation Church, Provident Label Group	
March 17	Fit for an Autopsy	The Great Collapse	Deathcore	eOne	
March 17	Frances	Things I've Never Said	Indie pop, soul	Capitol	
March 17	KXM	Scatterbrain	Hard rock	Rat Pak Records	
March 17	Milky Chance	Blossom	Folk	Lichtdicht, Ignition	
March 17	Nina Rodríguez	Heroína	Alternative pop		
March 17	Obituary	Obituary	Death metal	Relapse	
March 17	Pitbull	Climate Change	Pop, hip-hop	RCA, Polo Grounds, Mr. 305	
March 17	Real Estate	In Mind	Indie rock, jangle pop, dream pop	Domino	
March 17	Rick Ross	Rather You Than Me	Hip-hop	Epic	
March 17	Samantha Fish	Chills & Fever		Ruf	
March 17	Sorority Noise	You're Not As _____ As You Think	Emo, indie rock	Triple Crown	
March 17	Spoon	Hot Thoughts	Indie rock	Matador	
March 17	Tedeschi Trucks Band	Live from the Fox Oakland	Southern rock, blues rock	Fantasy	
March 17	Vera Lynn	Vera Lynn 100	Traditional pop	Decca	
March 17	Zara Larsson	So Good	Pop	Epic	
March 18	Drake	More Life	Hip-hop, R&B	Young Money, Cash Money, Republic	
March 20	CNBLUE	7°CN	Pop rock	FNC	
March 20	Highlight	Can You Feel It?	K-pop	Around Us Entertainment, LOEN	
March 21	2Cellos	Score		Sony Masterworks	
March 21	Monsta X	The Clan Pt. 2.5: The Final Chapter	K-pop, hip-hop	Starship Entertainment, LOEN	
March 21	Pristin	Hi! Pristin	K-pop	Pledis, LOEN	
March 24	Art of Anarchy	The Madness	Hard rock, alternative metal	Another Century	
March 24	Betty Who	The Valley	Synth-pop, dance-pop, electro house	RCA	
March 24	Boss Hog	Brood X		Bronze Rat, In the Red	
March 24	Bridget Kearney	Won't Let You Down	Pop	Signature Sounds	
March 24	Craig Finn	We All Want the Same Things	Indie rock	Partisan	
March 24	Creeper	Eternity, in Your Arms	Horror punk, punk rock	Roadrunner	
March 24	Desperate Journalist	Grow Up	Indie rock, post-punk	Fierce Panda	
March 24	Eliane Elias	Dance of Time	Jazz	Concord	
March 24	Fucked Up	Year of the Snake		Tankcrimes	
March 24	GoldLink	At What Cost	Hip-hop	RCA	
March 24	James Blunt	The Afterlove		Atlantic UK	
March 24	The Jesus and Mary Chain	Damage and Joy	Alternative rock	Warner Bros.	
March 24	The Kelly Family	We Got Love	Pop, rock, folk	Airforce1, Universal	
March 24	Kelly Lee Owens	Kelly Lee Owens		Smalltown Supersound	
March 24	La Vida Bohème	La Lucha	Indie rock	Nacional	
March 24	Lee Kernaghan	The 25th Anniversary Album	Country	ABC Music, Universal Music Australia	
March 24	Lindsay Ell	Worth the Wait	Country	Stoney Creek	
March 24	Louis the Child	Love Is Alive		Ultra Music	
March 24	Mike Will Made It	Ransom 2	Hip-hop, trap	EarDrummers, Interscope	
March 24	Mount Eerie	A Crow Looked at Me	Indie folk	P.W. Elverum & Sun	
March 24	Northlane	Mesmer	Metalcore, progressive metal	UNFD	
March 24	Octo Octa	Where Are We Going?	Deep house, chill-out, techno	HNYTRX	
March 24	Pallbearer	Heartless	Doom metal	Profound Lore	
March 24	Passion Pit	Tremendous Sea of Love		Wishart Group Recordings	
March 24	RaeLynn	WildHorse	Country	Warner Music Nashville	
March 24	Raekwon	The Wild	Hip-hop	Ice H2O, Empire	
March 24	The Residents	The Ghost of Hope	Dark ambient, rock	MVD Audio, Cherry Red	
March 24	RuPaul	American	Dance	RuCo, Inc.	
March 24	Ruthie Foster	Joy Comes Back	soul, blues, gospel	Blue Corn Music	
March 24	Skaters	Rock and Roll Bye Bye	Garage rock, psychedelic rock	Yonks Records	
March 24	Soulwax	From Deewee	Synth-pop	PIAS	
March 24	Spiral Stairs	Doris & the Daggers	Pop rock	Matador	
March 24	Steve Hackett	The Night Siren	Progressive rock	Inside Out Music	
March 24	Take That	Wonderland	Pop	Polydor	
March 24	Tonstartssbandht	Sorcerer		Mexican Summer	
March 24	Trey Songz	Tremaine the Album	R&B	Songbook, Atlantic	
March 24	Whit Dickey, Mat Maneri, and Matthew Shipp	Vessel in Orbit	Jazz	AUM Fidelity	
March 27	Girl's Day	Girl's Day Everyday 5	Pop	Dream Tea Entertainment, LOEN	
March 29	Ryuichi Sakamoto	Async	Electronic, experimental, ambient	Commmons, Milan	
March 30	Amir Obè	None of the Clocks Work		Def Jam	
March 31	50 Cent	Best of 50 Cent	Hip-hop, gangsta rap	Shady, Aftermath, Interscope	
March 31	Aimee Mann	Mental Illness	Folk, rock	SuperEgo	
March 31	Bob Dylan	Triplicate	Traditional pop	Columbia	
March 31	Body Count	Bloodlust	Thrash metal, groove metal, rap metal	Sumerian	
March 31	British Sea Power	Let the Dancers Inherit the Party		Caroline, Golden Chariot	
March 31	Chaz Bundick Meets The Mattson 2	Star Stuff		Company Records	
March 31	Christian Scott	Ruler Rebel	Jazz	Ropeadope, Stretch Music	
March 31	Cupcakke	Queen Elizabitch	Hip-hop		
March 31	Demon Hunter	Outlive	Heavy metal	Solid State	
March 31	Freddie Gibbs	You Only Live 2wice	Hip-hop	ESGN, Empire	
March 31	Goldfrapp	Silver Eye	Electroclash, Synth-pop	Mute	
March 31	Heavy Heart	Keepsake	Alternative rock, indie rock, dream pop	I Can & I Will, AWAL	
March 31	Homeboy Sandman	Veins	Hip-hop	Stones Throw	
March 31	Imminence	This Is Goodbye	Alternative rock, pop rock	Arising Empire	
March 31	Jackie Evancho	Two Hearts	Classical crossover	Portrait	
March 31	Jamiroquai	Automaton	Funk, disco	Virgin EMI	
March 31	Jennifer Paige	Starflower	Pop	Tone Tree Music	
March 31	Jon Stevens	Starlight	Rock	Liberation	
March 31	Julia Holter	In the Same Room	Baroque pop	Domino	
March 31	Kodak Black	Painting Pictures	Hip-hop, trap	Atlantic	
March 31	Loïc Nottet	Selfocracy	Electropop	Sony Music	
March 31	Mastodon	Emperor of Sand	Progressive metal	Reprise	
March 31	The Mavericks	Brand New Day	Tex-Mex, bluegrass	Mono Mundo Recordings	
March 31	Mr. Envi'	All Nite Grind	Hip-hop	Southern Stisles Records	
March 31	Nana Grizol	Ursa Minor	Indie rock	Orange Twin	
March 31	Nelly Furtado	The Ride	Indie pop, R&B	Nelstar	
March 31	Pharmakon	Contact		Sacred Bones	
March 31	Phish	St. Louis '93	Rock	JEMP	
March 31	Residente	Residente	Alternative hip-hop, urban, world	Fusion, Univision Communications	
March 31	Rodney Crowell	Close Ties		New West	
March 31	Trace Adkins	Something's Going On	Country	Wheelhouse	
March 31	Warbringer	Woe to the Vanquished	Thrash metal	Napalm	
March 31	Ward Thomas	A Shorter Story	Country pop	WTW Music, Sony Music	
March 31	Wire	Silver/Lead	Post-punk, art punk, alternative rock	Pinkflag	

== Second quarter ==
=== April ===
List of albums released in April 2017
Go to: January | February | March | April | May | June | July | August | September | October | November | December | Back to top
Release date	Artist	Album	Genre	Label	Ref.
April 1	Young Dolph	Bulletproof	Hip-hop, trap	Paper Route Empire	
April 3	Oh My Girl	Coloring Book	K-pop	WM Entertainment, LOEN	
April 4	K.Flay	Every Where Is Some Where	Electro, pop rock	Night Street, Interscope	
April 4	Winner	Fate Number For	K-pop, tropical house, alternative pop	YG Entertainment	
April 4	YFN Lucci	Long Live Nut	Hip-hop	Think It's a Game	
April 5	Koda Kumi	Koda Kumi Driving Hit's 7	Drum and bass, dubstep, house	Rhythm Zone	
April 6	The Caretaker	Everywhere at the End of Time - Stage 2	Ambient, big band, drone	History Always Favours The Winners	
April 7	Alexandra Savior	Belladonna of Sadness	Psychedelic pop	Columbia	
April 7	Arca	Arca	Electronic	XL	
April 7	Aye Nako	Silver Haze	Indie rock, punk	Don Giovanni	
April 7	Bethel Music	Starlight	Contemporary worship music, CCM	Bethel Music	
April 7	Betty Buckley	Story Songs			
April 7	The Big Moon	Love in the 4th Dimension	Indie rock, alternative rock	Fiction	
April 7	Blaenavon	That's Your Lot	Indie rock, folk rock	Atlantic	
April 7	Brian May and Kerry Ellis	Golden Days	Easy listening, pop rock	Sony Music	
April 7	The Chainsmokers	Memories...Do Not Open	Pop	Columbia, Disruptor Records	
April 7	Clark	Death Peak	Electronic	Warp	
April 7	Cold Beat	Chaos by Invitation	Electronic, synth-pop, darkwave	Crime on the Moon	
April 7	Cold War Kids	L.A. Divine	Indie rock	Capitol	
April 7	Cotton Mather	Wild Kingdom	Rock	The Star Apple Kingdom	
April 7	Dayna Stephens	Gratitude	Jazz	Contagious Music	
April 7	Dead by April	Worlds Collide	Metalcore, alternative metal	Universal	
April 7	Deep Purple	Infinite	Hard rock, heavy metal, progressive rock	earMUSIC	
April 7	Deez Nuts	Binge & Purgatory	Hardcore punk, nu metal, rapcore	Century Media, Sony Music	
April 7	Dopplereffekt	Cellular Automata		Leisure System	
April 7	Fabri Fibra	Fenomeno	Hip-hop	Universal Music Italy	
April 7	Falling in Reverse	Coming Home	Pop-punk, electropop, space rock	Epitaph	
April 7	Father John Misty	Pure Comedy	Indie folk, indie rock, soft rock	Bella Union, Sub Pop	
April 7	The Flatliners	Inviting Light	Punk rock	Rise, Dine Alone	
April 7	Future Islands	The Far Field	Synth-pop, new wave, indie pop	4AD	
April 7	Gonjasufi	Mandela Effect		Warp	
April 7	Guided by Voices	August by Cake	Indie rock	Rockathon	
April 7	Joey Badass	All-Amerikkkan Bada$$	Hip-hop	Pro Era, Cinematic	
April 7	Joshua Abrams and Natural Information Society	Simultonality	Free jazz, minimalism	Eremite	
April 7	Karen Elson	Double Roses	Rock	H.O.T. Records Ltd.	
April 7	The Maine	Lovely Little Lonely	Pop rock, alternative rock	8123	
April 7	Meng Jia	JIA	C-pop	Banana Culture Music	
April 7	Michelle Branch	Hopeless Romantic	Indie pop, rock	Verve	
April 7	Mila J	Dopamine	Hip-hop, R&B	Silent Partner Entertainment	
April 7	The New Pornographers	Whiteout Conditions	Indie rock	Concord	
April 7	Rachael Leahcar	Shadows		Fanfare	
April 7	San Fermin	Belong		Downtown, Interscope	
April 7	The Smith Street Band	More Scared of You than You Are of Me	Punk rock, indie rock	Pool House, Banquet, SideOneDummy	
April 7	Sun Ra and His Arkestra	Thunder of the Gods	Jazz	Modern Harmonic	
April 7	Tech N9ne	Dominion	Hip-hop	Strange Music	
April 7	Tee Grizzley	My Moment	Hip-hop, trap	300 Entertainment	
April 7	Timber Timbre	Sincerely, Future Pollution	Folk, country blues, freak folk	Arts & Crafts, City Slang	
April 7	Tina Arena	Greatest Hits & Interpretations	Pop	EMI Music Australia	
April 7	Ulver	The Assassination of Julius Caesar	Synth-pop, new wave, EDM	House of Mythology	
April 7	Wear Your Wounds	WYW	Post-rock	Deathwish	
April 7	White Reaper	The World's Best American Band	Blues rock, garage rock, power pop	Polyvinyl	
April 10	EXID	Eclipse	K-pop	Banana Culture, Sony Music	
April 12	D-Lite	D-Day	Folk, alternative rock	YGEX	
April 14	Adina Howard	Resurrection	hip-hop soul, R&B, trap	Indelible Enterprises	
April 14	Actress	AZD	Electronic	Ninja Tune	
April 14	Barenaked Ladies and The Persuasions	Ladies and Gentlemen: Barenaked Ladies and The Persuasions		Vanguard	
April 14	Enterprise Earth	Embodiment	Deathcore	Stay Sick	
April 14	John Mayer	The Search for Everything	Pop rock, soft rock, acoustic rock	Columbia	
April 14	Kendrick Lamar	Damn	Hip-hop	Top Dawg, Aftermath, Interscope	
April 14	Little Dragon	Season High	Downtempo, soul, synth-pop	Because Music	
April 14	Little Hurricane	Same Sun Same Moon	Alternative rock	Mascot	
April 14	Mark Vincent	A Tribute to Mario Lanza	Classical	Sony Music Australia	
April 14	Novembers Doom	Hamartia	Death-doom, progressive death metal, gothic metal	The End	
April 14	Playboi Carti	Playboi Carti	Hip-hop, cloud rap	AWGE, Interscope	
April 14	Rich Homie Quan	Back to the Basics	Hip-hop	RAIS, Motown	
April 14	Talib Kweli and Styles P	The Seven	Hip-hop	Javotti Media	
April 14	Tinie Tempah	Youth	Hip-hop	Parlophone, Disturbing London	
April 14	Various artists	The Fate of the Furious: The Album	Hip-hop, EDM, Latin pop	Atlantic	
April 14	Will Joseph Cook	Sweet Dreamer		Atlantic	
April 14	Wincent Weiss	Irgendwas gegen die Stille	Pop	Vertigo Berlin	
April 17	Minzy	Minzy Work 01: "Uno"	K-pop, ballad, R&B	Music Works, Sony Music	
April 17	Shamir	Hope	Indie rock, lo-fi		
April 19	DIA	YOLO	K-pop, bubblegum pop, trot	MBK, LOEN, Interpark	
April 19	Lee Hae-ri	h	K-pop, ballad	CJ E&M, B2M	
April 21	Adel Tawil	So schön anders	Pop	Polydor, Island	
April 21	Alee	Bad Habit	Country pop	Wax Records, Universal	
April 21	Allday	Speeding	Australian hip-hop	OneTwo	
April 21	Angaleena Presley	Wrangled	Americana, country	Thirty Tigers	
April 21	Barry Manilow	This Is My Town: Songs of New York		Decca, Stiletto Entertainment	
April 21	Bee Gees	Timeless: The All-Time Greatest Hits	Pop, rock, disco	Capitol	
April 21	Brad Paisley	Love and War	Country	Arista Nashville	
April 21	Cait Brennan	Third	Indie rock, glam rock, soul	Omnivore, ADA	
April 21	Charlie Worsham	Beginning of Things	Country	Warner Bros. Nashville	
April 21	Charly Bliss	Guppy	Bubblegum pop, grunge, power pop	Barsuk	
April 21	Eddie Palmieri	Sabiduría	Latin jazz	Ropeadope	
April 21	Gas	Narkopop	Ambient	Kompakt	
April 21	Greta Van Fleet	Black Smoke Rising	Rock	Republic	
April 21	Imelda May	Life Love Flesh Blood	Soft rock, soul	Decca	
April 21	Incubus	8	Alternative rock, indie rock, electronic music	Island	
April 21	IU	Palette	K-pop	Fave Entertainment, LOEN	
April 21	Maxïmo Park	Risk to Exist	Rock	Daylighting, Cooking Vinyl	
April 21	PJ Morton	Gumbo	R&B, soul, funk	Morton Records	
April 21	Procol Harum	Novum	Progressive rock, art rock	Eagle Rock	
April 21	Ray Davies	Americana	Rock	Legacy	
April 21	Robyn Hitchcock	Robyn Hitchcock	Psychedelic rock, pop rock, country rock	Yep Roc	
April 21	Sheryl Crow	Be Myself	Rock	Warner Bros.	
April 21	Steps	Tears on the Dancefloor	Pop	Steps Recordings, Warner Music	
April 21	Texas	Jump on Board	Alternative rock	BMG	
April 21	Various artists	Guardians of the Galaxy Vol. 2	Rock, soul	Hollywood, Marvel Music	
April 21	While She Sleeps	You Are We	Metalcore	SharpTone, UNFD	
April 22	Animal Collective	Meeting of the Waters	Experimental pop	Domino	
April 22	David Bowie	Cracked Actor (Live Los Angeles '74)	Glam rock, R&B	Parlophone	
April 22	Grateful Dead	July 29 1966, P.N.E. Garden Aud., Vancouver Canada	Rock	Rhino	
April 24	Kim Jong-hyun	Story Op.2	K-pop, R&B, soul	SM, KT Music	
April 26	Kara-Lis Coverdale	Grafts		Boomkat Editions	
April 26	Mito Natsume	Natsumelo	J-pop, pop rock, alternative dance	Sony Music Japan	
April 26	Sevdaliza	ISON	Trip hop	Twisted Elegance	
April 27	Foster the People	III	Indie pop, neo-psychedelia, alternative rock	Columbia	
April 28	All That Remains	Madness	Heavy metal, alternative metal, metalcore	Razor & Tie, Concord Bicycle	
April 28	American Standards	Anti-Melody	Metalcore, hardcore punk, post hardcore		
April 28	Ayreon	The Source	Rock opera, progressive rock, progressive metal	Mascot Label Group	
April 28	Big Big Train	Grimspound	Progressive rock	Giant Electric Pea	
April 28	Bliss n Eso	Off the Grid	Australian hip-hop	Illusive Sounds	
April 28	BNQT	Volume 1	Indie rock, soft rock, glam rock	Bella Union	
April 28	Cashmere Cat	9	Alternative R&B, electronic	Interscope, Mad Love	
April 28	CDB	Tailored for Now	R&B	Warner Music Australia	
April 28	Colin Stetson	All This I Do for Glory		52 Hz	
April 28	The Cranberries	Something Else	Alternative rock	BMG	
April 28	Feist	Pleasure		Universal	
April 28	Francesco Gabbani	Magellano		BMG	
April 28	Gorillaz	Humanz	Trip hop, R&B, electronic	Parlophone, Warner Bros.	
April 28	John Mellencamp	Sad Clowns & Hillbillies	Roots rock	Republic	
April 28	Jonathan Coulton	Solid State	Alternative rock	SuperEgo	
April 28	Juliana Hatfield	Pussycat	Alternative rock	American Laundromat	
April 28	Kontra K	Gute Nacht		BMG	
April 28	Lea Michele	Places	Pop	Columbia	
April 28	Levina	Unexpected	Pop	Unser Song, RCA, Sony Music	
April 28	Marie Miller	Letterbox	Country	Curb	
April 28	Mark Lanegan Band	Gargoyle		Heavenly	
April 28	Mary J. Blige	Strength of a Woman	R&B	Capitol	
April 28	Mew	Visuals	Alternative rock	PIAS	
April 28	New Found Glory	Makes Me Sick	Alternative rock	Hopeless	
April 28	The New Year	Snow	Indie rock	Undertow Music	
April 28	Shadow of Intent	Reclaimer	Deathcore		
April 28	Sylvan Esso	What Now	Folk pop, electronica	Loma Vista	
April 28	Thurston Moore	Rock n Roll Consciousness		Caroline, Fiction	
April 28	Van Morrison	The Authorized Bang Collection		Bang, Legacy	
April 28	Wale	Shine	Hip-hop	Maybach, Atlantic	
April 28	Willie Nelson	God's Problem Child	Country	Legacy	

=== May ===
List of albums released in May 2017
Go to: January | February | March | April | May | June | July | August | September | October | November | December | Back to top
Release date	Artist	Album	Genre	Label	Ref.
May 1	Triple H	199X	K-pop	Cube Entertainment	
May 5	The Afghan Whigs	In Spades	Alternative rock	Sub Pop	
May 5	Alma	Ma peau aime	Pop	Warner Music Group	
May 5	Andrew Rayel	Moments	Trance	Armada	
May 5	Anja Nissen	Where I Am	Pop	Universal Music Australia	
May 5	Arve Henriksen	Towards Language	Jazz	Rune Grammofon	
May 5	At the Drive-In	In·ter a·li·a	Post-hardcore	Rise	
May 5	Big Walnuts Yonder	Big Walnuts Yonder	Indie rock	Sargent House	
May 5	Blondie	Pollinator	Alternative rock, new wave, post-punk revival	BMG	
May 5	Bonnie "Prince" Billy	Best Troubador		Drag City	
May 5	Brother Ali	All the Beauty in This Whole Life	Hip-hop	Rhymesayers Entertainment	
May 5	Café Tacuba	Jei Beibi	Latin alternative, Latin rock, folk rock	Melotrón	
May 5	Carl Craig	Versus	Techno, classical	InFiné	
May 5	Cassper Nyovest	Thuto	Hip-hop, trap, R&B	Family Tree	
May 5	Chino Amobi	Paradiso	Electronic, avant-garde	Non Worldwide, Uno NYC	
May 5	Chris Stapleton	From A Room: Volume 1	Country	Mercury Nashville	
May 5	Colt Ford	Love Hope Faith	Country rap	Average Joes	
May 5	Day Wave	The Days We Had			
May 5	Diana Krall	Turn Up the Quiet	Jazz	Verve	
May 5	Forest Swords	Compassion	Experimental, electronic	Ninja Tune	
May 5	Full of Hell	Trumpeting Ecstasy	Deathgrind, sludge metal, noise	Profound Lore	
May 5	Grateful Dead	May 1977: Get Shown the Light	Rock	Rhino	
May 5	Ho99o9	United States of Horror	Hip-hop, electronic, industrial	Deathkult Records	
May 5	Johannes Oerding	Kreise	Pop, pop rock	Columbia	
May 5	Juana Molina	Halo	Folktronica	Crammed Discs	
May 5	Kasabian	For Crying Out Loud	Electronic rock, electronica, neo-psychedelia	Columbia, Sony Music	
May 5	Kid Ink	7 Series	Hip-hop	Tha Alumni Music Group, 88 Classic, RCA	
May 5	Logic	Everybody	Hip-hop	Visionary Music Group, Def Jam	
May 5	Mac DeMarco	This Old Dog	Indie rock, psychedelic rock	Captured Tracks	
May 5	Moon Duo	Occult Architecture Vol. 2		Sacred Bones	
May 5	Motionless in White	Graveyard Shift	Gothic metal, nu metal, industrial metal	Roadrunner	
May 5	Natalia Lafourcade and Los Macorinos	Musas	Folk	RCA, Sony Music	
May 5	Oxbow	Thin Black Duke	Art rock, post-hardcore	Hydra Head	
May 5	Ozomatli	Non-Stop: Mexico to Jamaica	Reggae	Cleopatra	
May 5	Perfume Genius	No Shape	Art pop, chamber pop	Matador	
May 5	Pond	The Weather	Psychedelic rock, neo-psychedelia	Marathon Artists	
May 5	Robin Trower	Time and Emotion		V-12 Records	
May 5	Russ	There's Really a Wolf	Hip-hop, R&B	Russ My Way Inc., Columbia	
May 5	Sigrid	Don't Kill My Vibe	Pop	Island	
May 5	Slowdive	Slowdive	Dream pop, shoegaze	Dead Oceans	
May 5	Taj Mahal and Keb' Mo'	TajMo	Blues	Concord	
May 5	Various artists	Cover Stories	Americana, country, rock	Legacy	
May 8	Grateful Dead	Cornell 5/8/77	Rock	Rhino	
May 10	Psy	4X2=8	K-pop	YG	
May 10	Siti Nurhaliza	SimetriSiti	Pop, R&B	Siti Nurhaliza Productions, Universal, EMI	
May 11	Jlin	Black Origami	Electronica, footwork	Planet Mu	
May 12	B.o.B	Ether	Hip-hop	Label No Genre, Grand Hustle, Empire	
May 12	Dean Lewis	Same Kind of Different	Pop, indie pop	Island, Universal Music Australia	
May 12	Dreamcar	Dreamcar		PLOF, Columbia	
May 12	Girlpool	Powerplant		Anti-	
May 12	Harry Styles	Harry Styles	Soft rock	Erskine, Columbia	
May 12	Helene Fischer	Helene Fischer	Schlager, pop	Polydor	
May 12	J Hus	Common Sense	Afroswing, UK rap, dancehall	Black Butter	
May 12	LeToya Luckett	Back 2 Life	R&B	eONE	
May 12	Machine Gun Kelly	bloom	Hip-hop	Bad Boy, Geffen, Interscope	
May 12	Paramore	After Laughter	New wave, pop rock, synth-pop	Fueled by Ramen, Warner Bros.	
May 12	Paul Weller	A Kind Revolution	Pop rock	Parlophone	
May 12	Pwr Bttm	Pageant	Queercore, indie rock, garage rock	Polyvinyl, Big Scary Monsters	
May 12	R5	New Addictions	Pop rock	Hollywood	
May 12	Seether	Poison the Parish	Rock	Canine Riot, Concord	
May 12	Todd Rundgren	White Knight	Synth-pop, rock	Cleopatra	
May 12	Warrant	Louder Harder Faster	Hard rock, heavy metal, glam metal	Frontiers	
May 12	Zac Brown Band	Welcome Home	Country	Elektra	
May 15	Twice	Signal	K-pop, dance	JYP, KT Music	
May 15	VIXX	Shangri-La	K-pop	Jellyfish Entertainment, CJ E&M Music	
May 16	The I.L.Y's	Bodyguard	Punk rock	Castle Face	
May 16	XXXTentacion	Revenge	Hip-hop, trap, punk rap	Bad Vibes Forever, Empire	
May 17	Sayuri	Mikazuki no Koukai	J-pop	Ariola Japan	
May 18	T-Pain and Lil Wayne	T-Wayne	Hip-hop, R&B	Nappy Boy	
May 19	!!!	Shake the Shudder	Dance-punk	Warp	
May 19	Aldous Harding	Party		4AD	
May 19	Alex G	Rocket	Indie rock, contemporary folk, Americana	Domino	
May 19	Burial	Subtemple / Beachfires	Ambient	Hyperdub	
May 19	Chris Price	Stop Talking	Indie pop, rock	Omnivore	
May 19	Daniel Romano	Modern Pressure		You've Changed, New West	
May 19	David Banner	The God Box	Hip-hop	A Banner Vision	
May 19	Do Make Say Think	Stubborn Persistent Illusions	Post-rock	Constellation	
May 19	DragonForce	Reaching into Infinity	Power metal, speed metal	Metal Blade	
May 19	Erasure	World Be Gone	Synth-pop	Mute	
May 19	Faith Evans and The Notorious B.I.G.	The King & I	Hip-hop, R&B	Rhino	
May 19	Flor	Come Out. You're Hiding		Fueled by Ramen	
May 19	Jane Weaver	Modern Kosmology		Fire	
May 19	The Kooks	The Best of... So Far	Rock	Virgin, Astralwerks	
May 19	Linkin Park	One More Light	Pop, pop rock, electropop	Warner	
May 19	MisterWives	Connect the Dots	Indie pop	Photo Finish, Republic	
May 19	The Mountain Goats	Goths	Indie rock, indie folk	Merge	
May 19	The Night Flight Orchestra	Amber Galactic	Progressive rock	Nuclear Blast	
May 19	Oceano	Revelation	Deathcore	Sumerian	
May 19	Papa Roach	Crooked Teeth	Alternative metal, hard rock, alternative rock	Eleven Seven Music	
May 19	Radiophonic Workshop	Burials in Several Earths	Electronic	Room 13	
May 19	Rascal Flatts	Back to Us	Country	Big Machine	
May 19	Rawsrvnt	Shut It Down	Hip-hop, Christian hip-hop, alternative hip-hop	Soul Deep	
May 19	Snoop Dogg	Neva Left	West Coast hip-hop, g-funk, gangsta rap	Doggy Style, Empire	
May 19	Tigers Jaw	Spin	Indie rock, pop rock	Black Cement Records	
May 19	The Underachievers	Renaissance	East Coast hip-hop	RPM MSC	
May 19	Wavves	You're Welcome		Ghost Ramp	
May 19	Wear Your Wounds	Dunedevil	Ambient, electronic		
May 21	The Basics	In the Rude!	Rock, Alternative rock	The Three Basics	
May 22	iKon	New Kids: Begin	K-pop	YG	
May 24	Exo-CBX	Girls	J-pop	Avex Trax	
May 24	Nogizaka46	Umarete Kara Hajimete Mita Yume	J-pop	Sony Music	
May 24	Tofubeats	Fantasy Club	J-pop, electronic	Unborde	
May 26	Alestorm	No Grave But the Sea	Power metal, folk metal	Napalm	
May 26	The Amazons	The Amazons	Alternative rock, psychedelic rock, power pop	Fiction	
May 26	Bill Frisell and Thomas Morgan	Small Town	Jazz	ECM	
May 26	Bryson Tiller	True to Self	R&B	RCA	
May 26	The Charlatans	Different Days	Madchester, Britpop	BMG	
May 26	Danzig	Black Laden Crown	Heavy metal, hard rock	Evilive, Nuclear Blast	
May 26	Frenzal Rhomb	Hi-Vis High Tea	Punk rock, pop-punk, melodic hardcore	Shock, Fat Wreck Chords	
May 26	Gucci Mane	Droptopwop	Hip-hop, trap	GUWOP, Atlantic	
May 26	In Hearts Wake	Ark	Metalcore	UNFD	
May 26	Justin Townes Earle	Kids in the Street	Country	New West	
May 26	Kraftwerk	3-D The Catalogue	Electronic	Kling Klang, Parlophone	
May 26	The Letter Black	Pain	Christian rock, hard rock, alternative rock	EMP Music Group	
May 26	Lil Yachty	Teenage Emotions	Hip-hop	Quality Control, Capitol, Motown	
May 26	Louis Hayes	Serenade for Horace	Jazz	Blue Note	
May 26	Molly Nilsson	Imaginations	Synth-pop	Dark Skies Association, Night School Records	
May 26	New Order	NOMC15			
May 26	Rhapsody of Fire	Legendary Years	Symphonic power metal	AFM	
May 26	Shakira	El Dorado	Latin pop	Sony Music Latin	
May 26	The Unthanks	The Songs and Poems of Molly Drake	Folk	Rabble Rouser	
May 29	Baek A-yeon	Bittersweet	K-pop	JYP	

=== June ===
List of albums released in June 2017
Go to: January | February | March | April | May | June | July | August | September | October | November | December | Back to top
Release date	Artist	Album	Genre	Label	Ref.
June 1	Major Lazer	Know No Better	Hip-hop, moombahton, pop	Mad Decent	
June 1	Yo Gotti and Mike Will Made It	Gotti Made-It	Hip-hop	CMG, Epic, Roc Nation	
June 2	'68	Two Parts Viper	Punk rock, blues rock, noise rock	Good Fight, Cooking Vinyl	
June 2	Adrenaline Mob	We the People	Heavy metal, alternative metal, hard rock	Century Media	
June 2	All Time Low	Last Young Renegade		Fueled by Ramen	
June 2	alt-J	Relaxer	Indie rock	Infectious, Atlantic	
June 2	Amber Coffman	City of No Reply	R&B, indie pop, art pop	Columbia	
June 2	Bea Miller	Chapter Two: Red	Pop	Hollywood	
June 2	Bleachers	Gone Now	Synth-pop, indie electronic	RCA	
June 2	Charlie Fink	Cover My Tracks	Indie rock	Hangman Records	
June 2	Chastity Belt	I Used to Spend So Much Time Alone		Hardly Art	
June 2	Dan Auerbach	Waiting on a Song	Pop, rock	Easy Eye Sound	
June 2	Dispatch	America, Location 12	Indie rock	Bomber Records	
June 2	Dua Lipa	Dua Lipa	Pop	Warner	
June 2	Flogging Molly	Life Is Good	Celtic punk, folk punk	Vanguard, Spinefarm	
June 2	Halsey	Hopeless Fountain Kingdom	Pop, synth-pop, electropop	Astralwerks	
June 2	Kool G Rap	Return of the Don		Clockwork Music, Full Mettle	
June 2	Luke Combs	This One's for You	Country, country pop	Columbia Nashville	
June 2	Marika Hackman	I'm Not Your Man		AMF Records, Virgin EMI, Sub Pop	
June 2	Noga Erez	Off the Radar	EDM, experimental pop, electropop	City Slang	
June 2	Omar Souleyman	To Syria, with Love		Mad Decent	
June 2	PartyNextDoor	Colours 2		OVO Sound	
June 2	Richard Dawson	Peasant	Progressive folk	Weird World	
June 2	Roger Waters	Is This the Life We Really Want?	Rock		
June 2	Saint Etienne	Home Counties		Heavenly	
June 2	Sikth	The Future in Whose Eyes?	Progressive metal, mathcore, avant-garde metal	Millennium Night, Peaceville	
June 2	Suran	Walkin'		Million Market, LOEN Entertainment	
June 2	Tankard	One Foot in the Grave	Thrash metal	Nuclear Blast	
June 2	Tops	Sugar at the Gate		Arbutus	
June 3	Aphex Twin	London 03.06.17	Techno	Warp	
June 3	Produce 101 Season 2	35 Boys 5 Concepts	K-pop	CJ E&M Music	
June 7	Ai	Wa to Yo	R&B, hip-hop	EMI	
June 7	Chungha	Hands on Me	Pop, tropical house, dance-pop	MNH Entertainment, CJ E&M Music	
June 7	Day6	Sunrise	K-pop, pop rock	JYP Entertainment, Genie Music	
June 7	Lingua Ignota	All Bitches Die			
June 8	G-Dragon	Kwon Ji Yong	R&B, hip-hop	YG	
June 8	Vic Mensa	The Manuscript	Hip-hop	Roc Nation	
June 9	AJR	The Click	Pop	BMG, S-Curve, Ultra	
June 9	Allie X	CollXtion II	Synth-pop	Twin Music	
June 9	Anathema	The Optimist	Progressive rock	Kscope	
June 9	Ani DiFranco	Binary	Indie rock, folk rock	Righteous Babe	
June 9	Big Thief	Capacity	Indie rock, folk rock	Saddle Creek	
June 9	BiSH	Giant Killers	Punk rock, pop-punk, alternative rock	Avex Trax	
June 9	Brockhampton	Saturation	Hip-hop	Brockhampton Records	
June 9	Christina Grimmie	All Is Vanity	Pop, electropop	Universal, Republic	
June 9	Chuck Berry	Chuck	Rock and roll	Dualtone	
June 9	Cigarettes After Sex	Cigarettes After Sex	Shoegaze, ambient pop, dream pop	Partisan	
June 9	Glen Campbell	Adiós	Country, pop, rock	Big Machine, Universal Music Enterprises	
June 9	Gov't Mule	Revolution Come...Revolution Go	Hard rock, blues rock, Southern rock	Fantasy	
June 9	Hillsong United	Wonder	Worship, CCM	Hillsong, Sparrow, Capitol CMG	
June 9	Jack DeJohnette, John Medeski, John Scofield, Larry Grenadier	Hudson	Jazz	Motéma	
June 9	Katy Perry	Witness	Dance-pop	Capitol	
June 9	Kirin J. Callinan	Bravado		Terrible	
June 9	Lady Antebellum	Heart Break	Country pop	Capitol Nashville	
June 9	Lindsey Buckingham and Christine McVie	Lindsey Buckingham Christine McVie	Rock, pop rock	Atlantic	
June 9	London Grammar	Truth Is a Beautiful Thing	Dream pop, trip hop	Metal & Dust, Ministry of Sound	
June 9	Phoenix	Ti Amo	Synth-pop, Italo disco	Glassnote	
June 9	Rancid	Trouble Maker	Punk rock	Hellcat, Epitaph	
June 9	Rise Against	Wolves	Punk rock	Virgin	
June 9	Suffocation	...Of the Dark Light	Technical death metal	Nuclear Blast	
June 9	Sufjan Stevens, Bryce Dessner, Nico Muhly, James McAlister	Planetarium		4AD	
June 9	SZA	Ctrl	Alternative R&B, neo soul	Top Dawg, RCA	
June 9	Various artists	Music from The American Epic Sessions: Original Motion Picture Soundtrack		Lo-Max, Columbia, Third Man	
June 12	Moby & The Void Pacific Choir	More Fast Songs About the Apocalypse	Electronica	Little Idiot, mute	
June 13	Hwang Chi-yeul	Be Ordinary	Pop	NHN	
June 14	NCT 127	Cherry Bomb	EDM, hip-hop, electropop	SM, Genie	
June 14	T-ara	What's My Name?	K-pop, EDM	MBK, Interpark	
June 16	2 Chainz	Pretty Girls Like Trap Music	Hip-hop, trap	Def Jam	
June 16	Alison Moyet	Other	Electropop	Cooking Vinyl	
June 16	Beth Ditto	Fake Sugar	Southern rock, pop	Virgin	
June 16	Big Boi	Boomiverse	Hip-hop	Epic	
June 16	Carach Angren	Dance and Laugh Amongst the Rotten	Symphonic black metal	Season of Mist	
June 16	Cheap Trick	We're All Alright!	Hard rock, power pop	Big Machine	
June 16	CKY	The Phoenix	Alternative metal, stoner rock, alternative rock	eOne	
June 16	Com Truise	Iteration	Synthwave	Ghostly International	
June 16	The Drums	Abysmal Thoughts	Indie pop, surf rock	Anti-	
June 16	Fleet Foxes	Crack-Up	Indie folk	Nonesuch	
June 16	Goldie	The Journey Man	Drum and bass, acid jazz, trip hop	Metalheadz, Cooking Vinyl	
June 16	Hey Violet	From the Outside	Indie pop	Capitol	
June 16	Hundredth	Rare	Shoegaze, alternative rock, indie rock	Hopeless	
June 16	Iced Earth	Incorruptible	Heavy metal, power metal	Century Media	
June 16	Igorrr	Savage Sinusoid		Metal Blade	
June 16	Jason Isbell and The 400 Unit	The Nashville Sound	Americana, alternative country	Southeastern Records	
June 16	Joyner Lucas	508-507-2209	Hip-hop	Atlantic Records	
June 16	Kathryn Williams	Songs from the Novel 'Greatest Hits'		One Little Indian	
June 16	Kevin Morby	City Music	Folk rock, indie folk	Dead Oceans	
June 16	Lorde	Melodrama	Alternative pop	Lava, Republic	
June 16	Nickelback	Feed the Machine	Rock	BMG	
June 16	Peaking Lights	The Fifth State of Consciousness	Psychedelic pop, experimental, synth-pop	Two Flowers	
June 16	Portugal. The Man	Woodstock	Rock	Atlantic	
June 16	Rich the Kid, Famous Dex and Jay Critch	Rich Forever 3	Hip-hop, trap	Rich Forever Music, 300	
June 16	Ride	Weather Diaries	Alternative rock, shoegaze	Wichita	
June 16	Royal Blood	How Did We Get So Dark?		Warner Bros.	
June 16	Styx	The Mission	Hard rock, rock, pop	UM^{e}	
June 16	Way Out West	Tuesday Maybe	Electronica, progressive house, chill-out, ambient	Anjunadeep	
June 16	Young Thug	Beautiful Thugger Girls	Hip-hop, trap, R&B	300, Atlantic	
June 22	Mamamoo	Purple	K-pop	Rainbow Bridge World	
June 23	311	Mosaic	Alternative rock, reggae rock, rap rock	BMG	
June 23	Algiers	The Underside of Power	Gospel, post-punk, psychedelic soul	Matador	
June 23	Bone Thugs	New Waves		eOne	
June 23	Camo & Krooked	Mosaik	Drum and bass	RAM, Mosaik Music, BMG	
June 23	The Chain Gang of 1974	Felt	Electronic rock	Caroline	
June 23	DJ Khaled	Grateful	Hip-hop, trap, R&B	We the Best, Epic	
June 23	Goatwhore	Vengeful Ascension	Blackened death metal	Metal Blade	
June 23	Imagine Dragons	Evolve	Pop rock, rock	KidinaKorner, Interscope	
June 23	Jeff Tweedy	Together at Last		dBpm	
June 23	Joe Scarborough	Mystified	Alternative rock, indie rock, power pop	RED Music, Sony Music	
June 23	King Gizzard & the Lizard Wizard	Murder of the Universe	Psychedelic rock, acid rock, progressive rock	Flightless, ATO, Heavenly	
June 23	Laurel Halo	Dust	Electronic, art pop	Hyperdub	
June 23	Municipal Waste	Slime and Punishment	Crossover thrash	Nuclear Blast	
June 23	Vérité	Somewhere in Between		Kobalt	
June 23	Vince Staples	Big Fish Theory	Hip-hop	ARTium, Def Jam	
June 23	The White Noise	AM/PM	Post-hardcore, hardcore punk, pop-punk	Fearless	
June 26	Seven Lions	Where I Won't Be Found	Electronic	Seeking Blue	
June 27	Stellar	Stellar Into the World		The Entertainment Pascal, Genie Music	
June 28	Cornelius	Mellow Waves	Shibuya-kei	Warner Music Japan, Rostrum	
June 28	Twice	#Twice		Warner Music Japan	
June 29	Up10tion	Stardom	K-pop	TOP, Loen	
June 30	The Beach Boys	1967 – Sunshine Tomorrow	Soul, rhythm and blues	Capitol	
June 30	Beach House	B-Sides and Rarities	Dream pop, indie rock	Sub Pop	
June 30	Calvin Harris	Funk Wav Bounces Vol. 1	Funk, disco, post-disco	Columbia	
June 30	Cellar Darling	This Is the Sound	Progressive rock, folk rock	Nuclear Blast	
June 30	Envy on the Coast	Ritual	Rock	Equal Vision	
June 30	Jay-Z	4:44	Hip-hop	Roc Nation	
June 30	Kacy Hill	Like a Woman	Electropop, trip hop, electronica	GOOD Music, Def Jam	
June 30	LANY	LANY	Electropop, alternative pop	Polydor	
June 30	MC Eiht	Which Way Iz West	West Coast hip-hop, gangsta rap, G-funk	Year Round, Blue Stamp Music	
June 30	Public Enemy	Nothing Is Quick in the Desert	Hip-hop		
June 30	Ratboys	GN		Topshelf	
June 30	Stone Sour	Hydrograd	Alternative metal	Roadrunner	
June 30	TLC	TLC	R&B, soul	852 Musiq, Cooking Vinyl	
June 30	Washed Out	Mister Mellow		Stones Throw	
June 30	ZZ Ward	The Storm	Blues rock, hip-hop	Hollywood	

== Third quarter ==
=== July ===
List of albums released in July 2017
Go to: January | February | March | April | May | June | July | August | September | October | November | December | Back to top
Release date	Artist	Album	Genre	Label	Ref.
July 4	Lee Hyori	Black	K-pop	Kiwi Media Group	
July 6	Sheer Mag	Need to Feel Your Love		Wilsuns Recording Company, Static Shock	
July 7	21 Savage	Issa Album	Hip-hop, trap	Slaughter Gang, Epic	
July 7	Broken Social Scene	Hug of Thunder	Indie rock, baroque pop	Arts & Crafts	
July 7	Chronixx	Chronology	Reggae	Soul Circle Music, Virgin	
July 7	Decapitated	Anticult	Groove metal, technical death metal	Nuclear Blast	
July 7	Haim	Something to Tell You	Pop rock	Polydor	
July 7	Lucy Rose	Something's Changing		Communion	
July 7	Melvins	A Walk with Love & Death	Experimental rock	Ipecac	
July 7	Mr. Big	Defying Gravity	Hard rock, blues rock, folk rock	Frontiers	
July 7	Public Service Broadcasting	Every Valley	Art rock	PIAS	
July 7	Sevyn Streeter	Girl Disrupted	R&B, soul	Atlantic	
July 7	This Is the Kit	Moonshine Freeze	Indie folk	Rough Trade	
July 9	Red Velvet	The Red Summer	K-pop	SM, Genie Music	
July 12	Boris	Dear	Drone metal	Sargent House, Daymare Recordings	
July 14	12 Stones	Picture Perfect	Hard rock, post-grunge	Cleopatra	
July 14	Coldplay	Kaleidoscope EP	Alternative rock	Parlophone	
July 14	Edguy	Monuments	Heavy metal, power metal	Nuclear Blast	
July 14	French Montana	Jungle Rules	Hip-hop	Bad Boy, Epic	
July 14	Japanese Breakfast	Soft Sounds from Another Planet	Dream pop, indie rock	Dead Oceans	
July 14	Laibach	Also Sprach Zarathustra	Electronic	Mute	
July 14	L D R U	Sizzlar	Electronic	Sony Music Australia	
July 14	Meg Mac	Low Blows	Indie pop	littleBIGMAN Records, Universal Music Australia	
July 14	Mura Masa	Mura Masa	Electronic	Interscope, Downtown, Anchor Point Records	
July 14	Offa Rex	The Queen of Hearts	Folk, British folk rock	Nonesuch	
July 14	The Pollyseeds	Sounds of Crenshaw Vol. 1		Sounds Of Crenshaw, Ropeadope	
July 14	Shabazz Palaces	Quazarz: Born on a Gangster Star		Sub Pop	
July 14	Shabazz Palaces	Quazarz vs. the Jealous Machines		Sub Pop	
July 14	Waxahatchee	Out in the Storm	Alternative rock, indie rock	Merge	
July 19	Nine Inch Nails	Add Violence	Industrial	The Null Corporation	
July 21	Avey Tare	Eucalyptus	Electroacoustic, experimental	Domino	
July 21	Chris Robinson Brotherhood	Barefoot in the Head		Silver Arrow Records	
July 21	Declan McKenna	What Do You Think About the Car?	Indie rock	Columbia	
July 21	Decrepit Birth	Axis Mundi	Technical death metal	Nuclear Blast	
July 21	Ded	Mis-An-Thrope	Nu metal	Surestone	
July 21	Dizzee Rascal	Raskit	Grime, British hip-hop	Dirtee Stank, Island	
July 21	Foster the People	Sacred Hearts Club		Columbia	
July 21	Goldfinger	The Knife	Pop-punk, ska punk	Rise	
July 21	In This Moment	Ritual	Alternative metal, hard rock, industrial metal	Atlantic, Roadrunner	
July 21	Lana Del Rey	Lust for Life		Interscope, Polydor	
July 21	Manafest	Stones	Christian hip-hop, rap rock, Christian alternative rock	Manafest Productions	
July 21	Manchester Orchestra	A Black Mile to the Surface	Indie rock, indie folk, art rock	Loma Vista	
July 21	Meek Mill	Wins & Losses	Hip-hop	Maybach, Atlantic	
July 21	Nav and Metro Boomin	Perfect Timing	Trap	Boominati, XO, Republic	
July 21	Nicole Atkins	Goodnight Rhonda Lee	Country, pop, soul	Single Lock	
July 21	Romeo Santos	Golden	Tropical music	Sony Music Latin	
July 21	Tyga	Bitch I'm the Shit 2	Hip-hop, trap	Last Kings, Empire	
July 21	Tyler, the Creator	Flower Boy	Hip-hop	Odd Future, Columbia	
July 21	Vera Blue	Perennial	Electropop, folk, alternative pop	Universal Music Australia	
July 24	Grave Babies	Holographic Violence	Gothic rock, darkwave	Hardly Art	
July 28	Alice Cooper	Paranormal	Hard rock	earMUSIC	
July 28	Arcade Fire	Everything Now	Dance-rock	Columbia	
July 28	The Fall	New Facts Emerge	Alternative rock	Cherry Red	
July 28	The Isley Brothers and Santana	Power of Peace		Legacy	
July 28	Jerry Garcia and Merl Saunders	Garcia Live Volume Nine	Rock, Rhythm and blues	ATO	
July 28	Jillette Johnson	All I Ever See in You Is Me			
July 28	Joe Nichols	Never Gets Old	Country	Red Bow	
July 28	Joywave	Content	Indie rock, electropop	Cultco, Hollywood	
July 28	Make Them Suffer	Worlds Apart	Progressive metalcore, symphonic death metal	Rise	
July 28	The Perceptionists	Resolution	Hip-hop	MMG	
July 28	Prong	Zero Days	Groove metal, thrash metal	Steamhammer/SPV	
July 28	Shaman's Harvest	Red Hands Black Deeds	Rock	Mascot Label Group	
July 28	John Pizzarelli, featuring Daniel Jobim	Sinatra & Jobim @ 50	Brazilian jazz, latin jazz	Concord Jazz	
July 28	Vic Mensa	The Autobiography	Hip-hop	Roc Nation, Capitol	

=== August ===
List of albums released in August 2017
Go to: January | February | March | April | May | June | July | August | September | October | November | December | Back to top
Release date	Artist	Album	Genre	Label	Ref.
August 2	ONF	On/Off	Dance	WM	
August 4	Accept	The Rise of Chaos	Heavy metal	Nuclear Blast	
August 4	Black Grape	Pop Voodoo	Funk, pop, trip hop	UMC	
August 4	Brett Eldredge	Brett Eldredge	Country	Atlantic Nashville	
August 4	Dead Cross	Dead Cross	Crossover thrash, experimental metal	Ipecac, Three One G	
August 4	George Thorogood	Party of One	Blues rock, boogie rock	Rounder	
August 4	Girl Ray	Earl Grey		Moshi Moshi	
August 4	Kenny Wayne Shepherd	Lay It On Down	Blues rock	Concord	
August 4	Khalil	Prove It All	R&B	Empire	
August 4	Quiet Riot	Road Rage	Heavy metal, hard rock, blues rock	Frontiers	
August 4	Randy Newman	Dark Matter		Nonesuch	
August 4	Rezz	Mass Manipulation	Electronic	mau5trap	
August 4	Tyler Childers	Purgatory	Americana, country	Hickman Holler Records	
August 4	Wage War	Deadweight	Metalcore	Fearless	
August 8	Sean Price	Imperius Rex	Hip-hop	Duck Down Music	
August 10	Avicii	Avīci (01)		Virgin, Avicii Music	
August 10	Oneohtrix Point Never	Good Time	Electronica	Warp	
August 10	Richard Thompson	Acoustic Classics II	Folk rock	Beeswing Records	
August 11	Bebe Rexha	All Your Fault: Pt. 2		Warner Bros.	
August 11	Billie Eilish	Don't Smile at Me	Electropop, bedroom pop	Darkroom, Interscope	
August 11	Blondes	Warmth	Electronic	R&S	
August 11	The Cribs	24-7 Rock Star Shit	Punk rock	Sonic Blew	
August 11	Jesus Culture	Love Has a Name	Contemporary worship, CCM	Jesus Culture Music, Sparrow, Capitol CMG	
August 11	Kesha	Rainbow	Pop	Kemosabe, RCA	
August 11	Lindsay Ell	The Project	Country pop	Stoney Creek	
August 11	Paul Draper	Spooky Action	Alternative rock, progressive rock	Kscope	
August 11	Rat Boy	Scum	Indie pop, indie rock	Parlophone	
August 11	Varials	Pain Again		Fearless	
August 15	Lil Peep	Come Over When You're Sober, Pt. 1	Emo rap, rap rock, pop-punk	AWAL	
August 16	Taeyang	White Night	R&B	YG Entertainment	
August 17	Brand New	Science Fiction	Alternative rock	Procrastinate! Music Traitors	
August 17	Lil B	Black Ken	Hip-hop	BasedWorld	
August 17	MewithoutYou	Untitled	Indie rock, art rock	Run for Cover, Big Scary Monsters	
August 17	Motograter	Desolation	Nu metal, metalcore	EMP	
August 18	Alice Glass	Alice Glass	Electropop	Loma Vista Recordings	
August 18	ASAP Ferg	Still Striving	Hip-hop	ASAP Worldwide, RCA	
August 18	Dent May	Across the Multiverse		Carpark	
August 18	Eluveitie	Evocation II: Pantheon	Acoustic rock, folk rock, Celtic rock	Nuclear Blast	
August 18	Everything Everything	A Fever Dream	Indie pop, art pop, indie rock	RCA Victor	
August 18	Gang of Youths	Go Farther in Lightness	Indie rock	Mosy Recordings, Sony Australia	
August 18	Grizzly Bear	Painted Ruins	Indie rock	RCA	
August 18	Josh Abbott Band	Until My Voice Goes Out	Country	Prety Damn Tough, Reviver Records	
August 18	King Gizzard & the Lizard Wizard and Mild High Club	Sketches of Brunswick East	Psychedelic rock, jazz	Flightless, ATO, Heavenly	
August 18	Neck Deep	The Peace and the Panic	Pop-punk	Hopeless	
August 18	Rainer Maria	S/T		Polyvinyl	
August 18	Shelby Lynne and Allison Moorer	Not Dark Yet	Americana, country, folk	Thirty Tigers, Silver Cross Records	
August 18	Steven Wilson	To the Bone	Art rock	Caroline	
August 18	Thy Art Is Murder	Dear Desolation	Deathcore	Nuclear Blast	
August 18	Unkle	The Road: Part 1		Songs for the Def	
August 25	Action Bronson	Blue Chips 7000	Hip-hop	Vice, Atlantic	
August 25	Apollo Brown and Planet Asia	Anchovies	Hip-hop	Mello Music	
August 25	ASAP Mob	Cozy Tapes Vol. 2: Too Cozy	Hip-hop, trap	ASAP Worldwide, RCA, Polo Grounds	
August 25	Black Belt Eagle Scout	Mother of My Children	Grunge	Good Cheer Records, Saddle Creek	
August 25	Brendon Small	Brendon Small's Galaktikon II: Become the Storm	Melodic death metal	BS, Megaforce	
August 25	Brockhampton	Saturation II	Hip-hop	Question Everything, Inc, Empire	
August 25	Daniel Caesar	Freudian	R&B	Golden Child Recordings	
August 25	EMA	Exile in the Outer Ring		City Slang	
August 25	Fifth Harmony	Fifth Harmony	R&B, pop, hip-hop	Epic, Syco	
August 25	Gogol Bordello	Seekers and Finders	Folk punk, folk, gypsy punk	Cooking Vinyl	
August 25	Hammock	Mysterium	Ambient	Hammock Music	
August 25	Hype Williams	Rainbow Edition	Hypnagogic pop	Big Dada	
August 25	Iron & Wine	Beast Epic	Indie folk	Black Cricket Recording Company, Sub Pop	
August 25	Kitty	Miami Garden Club	Cloud rap, experimental pop	Pretty Wavvy	
August 25	Liars	TFCF	Art rock, electronica	Mute	
August 25	Lil Uzi Vert	Luv Is Rage 2	Hip-hop, trap, pop rap	Generation Now, Atlantic	
August 25	The Mynabirds	Be Here Now		Saddle Creek	
August 25	Nadine Shah	Holiday Destination	Post-punk, alternative rock	1965	
August 25	Oh Sees	Orc	Garage rock, psychedelic rock	Castle Face	
August 25	Old Dominion	Happy Endings	Country pop	RCA Nashville	
August 25	Oliver	Full Circle	Electropop	Interscope	
August 25	PVRIS	All We Know of Heaven, All We Need of Hell		Rise	
August 25	Queens of the Stone Age	Villains	Stoner rock, hard rock, boogie rock	Matador	
August 25	Tribalistas	Tribalistas	Música popular brasileira, pop	Phonomotor Records, Universal Music	
August 25	Vijay Iyer	Far from Over	Jazz	ECM	
August 25	The War on Drugs	A Deeper Understanding	Heartland rock, synth-pop, Americana	Atlantic	
August 25	Wiki	No Mountains in Manhattan	Hip-hop	XL	
August 25	XXXTentacion	17	Emo rap, alternative rock, R&B	Bad Vibes Forever, Empire	

=== September ===
List of albums released in September 2017
Go to: January | February | March | April | May | June | July | August | September | October | November | December | Back to top
Release date	Artist	Album	Genre	Label	Ref.
September 1	Anthony Callea	ARIA Number 1 Hits in Symphony	Pop	Sony Music Australia	
September 1	Bicep	Bicep	Electronic	Ninja Tune	
September 1	Cloud Control	Zone		Ivy League	
September 1	Hercules and Love Affair	Omnion		Atlantic, Big Beat	
September 1	Jake Bugg	Hearts That Strain	Americana	Virgin EMI	
September 1	Joan Osborne	Songs of Bob Dylan	Folk rock	Thirty Tigers, Womanly Hips Records	
September 1	LCD Soundsystem	American Dream	Dance-punk, new wave, post-punk	DFA, Columbia	
September 1	Madeline Kenney	Night Night at the First Landing	Indie rock	Company Records	
September 1	Mogwai	Every Country's Sun	Post-rock	Rock Action	
September 1	Orchestral Manoeuvres in the Dark	The Punishment of Luxury	Synth-pop	White Noise	
September 1	Paradise Lost	Medusa	Death-doom	Nuclear Blast	
September 1	The Script	Freedom Child	Pop rock, dance, electronic rock	Columbia, Sony Music	
September 1	Starsailor	All This Life	Alternative rock, post-Britpop	Cooking Vinyl	
September 5	Corbin	Mourn	Alternative R&B	WeDidIt Records	
September 7	Syd	Always Never Home	R&B	The Internet, Columbia	
September 8	Alex Cameron	Forced Witness	Synth-pop, indie rock	Secretly Canadian	
September 8	Alter Bridge	Live at the O2 Arena + Rarities	Hard rock, heavy metal, post-grunge	Napalm	
September 8	Alvvays	Antisocialites	Indie pop	Polyvinyl, Royal Mountain, Transgressive	
September 8	Anna of the North	Lovers	Synth-pop	Honeymoon Records	
September 8	The Belonging Co	All the Earth	Contemporary worship music	TBCO Music	
September 8	Death from Above	Outrage! Is Now	Alternative rock, hard rock, heavy metal	Last Gang	
September 8	Deerhoof	Mountain Moves	Indie pop, art rock	Joyful Noise	
September 8	The Dream Syndicate	How Did I Find Myself Here?	Alternative rock, neo-psychedelia	Anti-	
September 8	Dustin Lynch	Current Mood	Country	Broken Bow	
September 8	Jack Johnson	All the Light Above It Too	Rock, folk rock, surf rock	Brushfire, Republic	
September 8	Kip Moore	Slowheart	Country rock	MCA Nashville	
September 8	Living Colour	Shade		Megaforce	
September 8	Mount Kimbie	Love What Survives	Post-punk, electronic	Warp	
September 8	Mutemath	Play Dead		Wojtek	
September 8	The National	Sleep Well Beast	Indie rock, post-punk revival	4AD	
September 8	Neil Young	Hitchhiker	Rock	Reprise	
September 8	Nothing But Thieves	Broken Machine	Alternative rock, indie rock, hard rock	RCA, Sony Music	
September 8	Odesza	A Moment Apart	Indie electronic, synth-pop, experimental	Counter, Foreign Family Collective, Ninja Tune	
September 8	Project Pat	M.O.B.	Southern hip-hop	Cleopatra	
September 8	Sparks	Hippopotamus	Rock, baroque pop	BMG, The End	
September 8	Susanne Sundfør	Music for People in Trouble	Art pop, folk	Bella Union	
September 8	Thomas Rhett	Life Changes	Country pop	Valory	
September 8	Toadies	The Lower Side of Uptown	Alternative rock	Kirtland	
September 8	Tori Amos	Native Invader	Alternative rock, baroque pop, chamber pop	Decca	
September 8	The Waterboys	Out of All This Blue		BMG	
September 8	Zola Jesus	Okovi	Gothic rock, dark wave	Sacred Bones	
September 15	Anastacia	Evolution	Pop, pop rock, dance	Four Eyez Productions, Polydor	
September 15	Angus & Julia Stone	Snow		EMI Music Australia, Nettwerk	
September 15	Arcane Roots	Melancholia Hymns	Alternative rock, mathcore, electronica	Easy Life Records, Red Essential Records	
September 15	Ariel Pink	Dedicated to Bobby Jameson	Pop, indie pop, hypnagogic pop	Mexican Summer	
September 15	Big & Rich	Did It for the Party	Country	Big & Rich Records, Thirty Tigers	
September 15	Cody Carnes	The Darker the Night / The Brighter the Morning	Worship, CCM, Christian alternative rock	Sparrow	
September 15	The Cool Kids	Special Edition Grandmaster Deluxe	Hip-hop	Green Label Sound	
September 15	Eamon	Golden Rail Motel	R&B	Huey Ave Music	
September 15	Ensiferum	Two Paths	Folk metal, melodic death metal, Viking metal	Metal Blade	
September 15	Foo Fighters	Concrete and Gold	Hard rock	Roswell, RCA	
September 15	Galantis	The Aviary	EDM	Big Beat, Atlantic	
September 15	Gary Numan	Savage (Songs from a Broken World)		BMG, The End	
September 15	Irène Schweizer and Joey Baron	Live!	Jazz	Intakt	
September 15	Lee Ranaldo	Electric Trim	Alternative rock, experimental rock, acoustic rock	Mute	
September 15	Madonna	Rebel Heart Tour		Boy Toy, Live Nation, Interscope	
September 15	Nothing More	The Stories We Tell Ourselves	Hard rock, alternative metal	Eleven Seven	
September 15	Open Mike Eagle	Brick Body Kids Still Daydream	Hip-hop	Mello Music	
September 15	Prophets of Rage	Prophets of Rage	Rap rock, hard rock, funk rock	Fantasy, Caroline	
September 15	Ringo Starr	Give More Love	Pop rock, country, reggae	UM^{e}	
September 15	Rostam	Half-Light	Art pop, indie rock, indietronica	Nonesuch	
September 15	Seaway	Vacation	Pop-punk	Pure Noise	
September 15	Seth MacFarlane	In Full Swing	Traditional pop, vocal jazz, swing	Republic, Verve, Fuzzy Door Productions	
September 15	Wyclef Jean	Carnival III: The Fall and Rise of a Refugee	Hip-hop	Heads Music	
September 21	Illenium	Awake	Future bass	Seeking Blue, Kasaya	
September 22	Billy Strings	Turmoil & Tinfoil	Bluegrass	Apostol Recording Company	
September 22	Chelsea Wolfe	Hiss Spun	Doom metal	Sargent House	
September 22	Christian McBride Big Band	Bringin' It	Jazz	Mack Avenue	
September 22	Circa Survive	The Amulet	Progressive rock, post-hardcore	Hopeless	
September 22	The Clientele	Music for the Age of Miracles	Indie rock	Merge	
September 22	Cradle of Filth	Cryptoriana – The Seductiveness of Decay	Extreme metal	Nuclear Blast	
September 22	Cut Copy	Haiku from Zero	Indietronica, synth-pop, dance-rock	Cutters Records, Astralwerks	
September 22	DJ Kay Slay	The Big Brother	Hip-hop	Streetsweepers, Empire	
September 22	Enter Shikari	The Spark	Electronic rock	Ambush Reality, PIAS	
September 22	Fergie	Double Dutchess	Hip-hop, dance, R&B	Dutchess Music, Retrofuture, BMG	
September 22	Godspeed You! Black Emperor	Luciferian Towers	Post-rock, drone	Constellation	
September 22	The Horrors	V	Neo-psychedelia, shoegaze, post-punk	Wolf Tone, Caroline	
September 22	Josh Ritter	Gathering	Folk rock, Americana	Pytheas Recordings	
September 22	The Killers	Wonderful Wonderful	Indie pop, heartland rock, new wave	Island	
September 22	Kristene DiMarco	Where His Light Was	CCM, worship	Bethel Music	
September 22	Lights	Skin & Earth	Electropop	Warner Bros.	
September 22	Luna	A Sentimental Education		Double Feature Records	
September 22	Macklemore	Gemini	Pop-rap	Bendo LLC, Warner Music	
September 22	Mastodon	Cold Dark Place	Progressive rock, stoner rock, hard rock	Reprise	
September 22	Metz	Strange Peace	Noise rock, hardcore punk, alternative rock	Sub Pop	
September 22	Midland	On the Rocks	Neotraditional country	Big Machine	
September 22	Moses Sumney	Aromanticism	Chamber folk, electro-soul	Jagjaguwar	
September 22	Phoebe Bridgers	Stranger in the Alps	Indie rock, indie folk	Dead Oceans	
September 22	Satyricon	Deep Calleth Upon Deep		Napalm	
September 22	Sleeping with Sirens	Gossip	Pop rock	Warner Bros.	
September 22	Tricky	Ununiform		False Idols	
September 22	Van Morrison	Roll with the Punches	Rock	Caroline	
September 22	Wand	Plum		Drag City	
September 22	Wolves in the Throne Room	Thrice Woven	Black metal	Artemisia	
September 27	B1A4	Rollin'	Dance, K-pop	WM Entertainment	
September 28	The Caretaker	Everywhere at the End of Time - Stage 3	Ambient, big band, dark ambient	History Always Favours The Winners	
September 29	Benjamin Clementine	I Tell a Fly	Avant-garde, experimental pop, contemporary classical	Virgin EMI	
September 29	Cécile McLorin Salvant	Dreams and Daggers	Jazz	Mack Avenue	
September 29	Chanté Moore	The Rise of the Phoenix	R&B, soul	CM7 Records, Fontana	
September 29	David Crosby	Sky Trails	Jazz rock	BMG	
September 29	David Gilmour	Live at Pompeii	Progressive rock, blues rock	Columbia	
September 29	Demi Lovato	Tell Me You Love Me	Pop, R&B	Island, Hollywood, Safehouse	
September 29	Dolly Parton	I Believe in You	Country, children's	Dolly Records, RCA Nashville	
September 29	Echosmith	Inside a Dream	Synth-pop, indie pop	Warner Bros.	
September 29	Four Tet	New Energy	Electronic	Text	
September 29	Hurts	Desire	Electropop, synth-pop, pop rock	Columbia	
September 29	Ibeyi	Ash	Alternative R&B, hip-hop, Yoruba	XL	
September 29	Injury Reserve	Drive It Like It's Stolen	Underground hip-hop		
September 29	Kamasi Washington	Harmony of Difference	Jazz	Young	
September 29	Lucinda Williams	This Sweet Old World	Country, folk	Highway 20 Records, Thirty Tigers	
September 29	Marius Neset	Circle of Chimes	Jazz	ACT	
September 29	Michael Jackson	Scream		Epic	
September 29	Miley Cyrus	Younger Now	Country pop, pop rock	RCA	
September 29	Pere Ubu	20 Years in a Montana Missile Silo		Cherry Red	
September 29	Primus	The Desaturating Seven	Progressive rock	ATO, Prawn Song	
September 29	Propagandhi	Victory Lap	Melodic hardcore, thrash metal	Epitaph	
September 29	Protomartyr	Relatives in Descent	Post-punk, art punk, noise rock	Domino	
September 29	Rick Price and Jack Jones	California Dreaming	Pop	Sony Music Australia	
September 29	Shania Twain	Now	Country pop	Mercury Nashville	
September 29	Tamar Braxton	Bluebird of Happiness	R&B	Logan Land Records	
September 29	Torres	Three Futures	Folk rock, alternative rock	4AD	
September 29	Unsane	Sterilize	Noise rock, heavy metal	Southern Lord	
September 29	Wolf Alice	Visions of a Life	Alternative rock	Dirty Hit	
September 29	The World Is a Beautiful Place & I Am No Longer Afraid to Die	Always Foreign	Emo, indie rock, post-rock	Epitaph	

== Fourth quarter ==
=== October ===
List of albums released in October 2017
Go to: January | February | March | April | May | June | July | August | September | October | November | December | Back to top
Release date	Artist	Album	Genre	Label	Ref.
October 5	Sabrina Claudio	About Time	Alternative R&B, indie pop, soul	SC Entertainment	
October 6	Alex Lahey	I Love You Like a Brother			
October 6	August Burns Red	Phantom Anthem	Melodic metalcore, Christian metal	Fearless	
October 6	The Black Dahlia Murder	Nightbringers	Melodic death metal	Metal Blade	
October 6	The Church	Man Woman Life Death Infinity	Alternative rock, neo-psychedelia, psychedelic rock	Unorthodox Records	
October 6	Cults	Offering		Sinderlyn	
October 6	The Darkness	Pinewood Smile	Hard rock, glam rock	Canary Dwarf, Cooking Vinyl	
October 6	Gwen Stefani	You Make It Feel Like Christmas	Christmas	Interscope	
October 6	Jason Manford	A Different Stage		Decca	
October 6	Daphni	Joli Mai		Jiaolong	
October 6	Kaitlyn Aurelia Smith	The Kid		Western Vinyl	
October 6	Kelela	Take Me Apart	Alternative R&B, electro, R&B	Warp	
October 6	Lara Fabian	Camouflage	Pop	Sony Music	
October 6	Liam Gallagher	As You Were	Rock	Warner Bros.	
October 6	Marilyn Manson	Heaven Upside Down	Gothic rock, industrial metal, punk rock	Loma Vista, Caroline	
October 6	NF	Perception	Hip-hop	NF Real Music, Capitol	
October 6	Poppy	Poppy.Computer	Art pop, synth-pop, electropop	I'm Poppy, Mad Decent	
October 6	Shigeto	The New Monday		Ghostly International	
October 6	Tokimonsta	Lune Rouge	Electronic	Young Art Records	
October 6	The Weather Station	The Weather Station		Paradise of Bachelors	
October 6	Weaves	Wide Open		Kanine	
October 6	Wolf Parade	Cry Cry Cry	Indie rock	Sub Pop	
October 13	Anouar Brahem	Blue Maqams	Jazz	ECM	
October 13	The Barr Brothers	Queens of the Breakers		Secret City	
October 13	Beck	Colors	Pop rock, dance-rock, experimental pop	Capitol	
October 13	Carly Pearce	Every Little Thing	Country	Big Machine	
October 13	Courtney Barnett and Kurt Vile	Lotta Sea Lice	Indie rock, alternative rock	Matador, Marathon Artists, Milk! Records	
October 13	Dirty Heads	Swim Team	Reggae rock	Five Seven	
October 13	Dvsn	Morning After	Alternative R&B	OVO	
October 13	Enslaved	E	Progressive metal, black metal	Nuclear Blast	
October 13	The Front Bottoms	Going Grey		Fueled by Ramen	
October 13	The Glorious Sons	Young Beauties and Fools	Alternative rock, hard rock, Southern rock	Black Box	
October 13	Gucci Mane	Mr. Davis	Hip-hop, trap	GUWOP, 1017, Atlantic	
October 13	Iron Chic	You Can't Stay Here	Pop-punk, punk rock	SideOneDummy	
October 13	Jessie James Decker	Southern Girl City Lights	Country pop	Epic	
October 13	King Krule	The Ooz	Trip hop	True Panther Sounds, XL	
October 13	Knuckle Puck	Shapeshifter	Pop-punk	Rise	
October 13	L.A. Guns	The Missing Peace	Glam metal	Frontiers Music Srl	
October 13	Pink	Beautiful Trauma	Pop	RCA	
October 13	Robert Plant	Carry Fire	Americana	Nonesuch	
October 13	Russell Dickerson	Yours	Country pop	Triple Tigers	
October 13	The Score	Atlas		Republic	
October 13	Squeeze	The Knowledge	Rock	Love Records	
October 13	St. Vincent	Masseduction	Pop, new wave, glam rock	Loma Vista	
October 13	Stars	There Is No Love in Fluorescent Light	Indie pop, synth-pop, dream pop	Last Gang	
October 13	Through the Eyes of the Dead	Disomus	Death metal, deathcore	eOne, Good Fight	
October 13	William Patrick Corgan	Ogilala	Acoustic rock, folk	BMG, Martha's Music, Reprise	
October 20	Bully	Losing	Indie rock, alternative rock, grunge	Sub Pop	
October 20	Chris Young	Losing Sleep	Country	RCA Nashville	
October 20	Darius Rucker	When Was the Last Time	Country	Capitol Nashville	
October 20	Destroyer	Ken	Indie rock, new wave, jazz rock	Merge	
October 20	Europe	Walk the Earth	Hard rock, heavy metal	Hell & Back	
October 20	Future and Young Thug	Super Slimey	Hip-hop, trap	Freebandz, YSL, Epic	
October 20	Jessie Ware	Glasshouse	Rock	Island	
October 20	Keyshia Cole	11:11 Reset	R&B	Epic, Sony Music, Hearts and Stars Production Inc.	
October 20	Lindsey Stirling	Warmer in the Winter	Christmas, classical crossover	Lindseystomp, Universal, Concord	
October 20	Makthaverskan	Ill		Luxury Recordings, Run for Cover	
October 20	Margo Price	All American Made	Country	Third Man	
October 20	Niall Horan	Flicker	Folk pop	Capitol	
October 20	Paul van Dyk	From Then On	Trance	Vandit	
October 20	Sons of Apollo	Psychotic Symphony	Progressive metal	Inside Out	
October 20	Trivium	The Sin and the Sentence	Thrash metal, heavy metal, progressive metal	Roadrunner	
October 20	Turnpike Troubadours	A Long Way from Your Heart		Bossier City Records	
October 20	Wadada Leo Smith	Najwa	Jazz	TUM Records	
October 20	Wadada Leo Smith	Solo: Reflections and Meditations on Monk	Jazz	TUM Records	
October 27	10 Years	(How to Live) as Ghosts	Alternative rock, hard rock	Mascot	
October 27	Baxter Dury	Prince of Tears		PIAS Le Label, Heavenly	
October 27	Big K.R.I.T.	4eva Is a Mighty Long Time	Southern hip-hop	BMG, Multi Alumni	
October 27	Communic	Where Echoes Gather	Progressive metal, power metal, thrash metal	AFM	
October 27	Daniele Luppi and Parquet Courts	Milano		30th Century, Columbia	
October 27	Fever Ray	Plunge	Electropop, experimental	Rabid, Mute	
October 27	Gord Downie	Introduce Yerself		Arts & Crafts Productions	
October 27	Granger Smith	When the Good Guys Win	Country	Wheelhouse	
October 27	Gregory Porter	Nat King Cole & Me	Jazz	Decca, Blue Note	
October 27	Hollywood Undead	Five		MDDN, BMG	
October 27	John Maus	Screen Memories	Synth-pop, goth-pop, post-punk	Ribbon Music	
October 27	Julien Baker	Turn Out the Lights		Matador	
October 27	Kelly Clarkson	Meaning of Life	Soul, pop, R&B	Atlantic	
October 27	Lee Ann Womack	The Lonely, the Lonesome & the Gone	Country blues, Americana, countrypolitan	ATO	
October 27	Martin Carr	New Shapes of Life		Tapete	
October 27	Powerman 5000	New Wave	Industrial metal, punk rock	Pavement Music	
October 27	Rachel Platten	Waves		Columbia	
October 27	Red	Gone	Christian rock	Essential	
October 27	Rina Sawayama	Rina	Pop, R&B	Rina Sawayama	
October 27	Stereophonics	Scream Above the Sounds	Rock	Stylus Records, Parlophone	
October 27	Theory of a Deadman	Wake Up Call	Pop, pop rock	Roadrunner, Atlantic	
October 27	Ty Dolla Sign	Beach House 3	Hip-hop, R&B	Atlantic	
October 27	The Used	The Canyon	Post-hardcore, alternative rock	Hopeless	
October 27	A Wake in Providence	Insidious: Phase II		Outerloop Records	
October 27	Weezer	Pacific Daydream	Pop rock, alternative rock, power pop	Atlantic	
October 27	Yelawolf	Trial by Fire	Country rap	Slumerican, Shady, Interscope	
October 30	Twice	Twicetagram	K-pop, Bubblegum pop, dance	JYP	
October 31	21 Savage, Offset and Metro Boomin	Without Warning	Hip-hop, trap	Motown, Epic, Capitol	
October 31	Big Dumb Face	Where Is Duke Lion? He's Dead...		Edison Sound	
October 31	Chris Brown	Heartbreak on a Full Moon	R&B	RCA	
October 31	Willow Smith	The 1st		Roc Nation	

=== November ===
List of albums released in November 2017
Go to: January | February | March | April | May | June | July | August | September | October | November | December | Back to top
Release date	Artist	Album	Genre	Label	Ref.
November 3	Armand Hammer	Rome	Hip-hop	Backwoodz Studioz	
November 3	Bibio	Phantom Brickworks	Ambient, minimal, electronic	Warp	
November 3	Billy Bragg	Bridges Not Walls		Cooking Vinyl	
November 3	Blake Shelton	Texoma Shore	Country	Warner Bros. Nashville	
November 3	Bryan Adams	Ultimate	Rock, soft rock	Polydor	
November 3	Converge	The Dusk in Us	Metalcore, post-hardcore, sludge metal	Epitaph, Deathwish	
November 3	Grace VanderWaal	Just the Beginning	Pop, indie pop, bluegrass	Columbia, Syco	
November 3	Guy Sebastian	Conscious	Pop, R&B	Sony Music Australia	
November 3	James Holden and the Animal Spirit	The Animal Spirits	Electronic, jazz	Border Community	
November 3	Joji	In Tongues	Trip hop, lo-fi, alternative R&B	Empire, 88rising	
November 3	Kelsea Ballerini	Unapologetically	Country pop	Black River	
November 3	Kid Rock	Sweet Southern Sugar	Southern rock, country	BMG, Top Dog Records, BMG	
November 3	Kygo	Kids in Love		Sony Music, Ultra	
November 3	Lee Brice	Lee Brice	Country	Curb	
November 3	Maroon 5	Red Pill Blues	Pop, R&B, funk, soft rock	222, Interscope	
November 3	Polaris	The Mortal Coil	Metalcore	Resist Records, SharpTone	
November 3	Sam Smith	The Thrill of It All	Soul, gospel, pop	Capitol	
November 3	Signs of the Swarm	The Disfigurement of Existence		Unique Leader Records	
November 3	Symphony Number One	Approaching	Contemporary classical	SNOtone	
November 10	The Corrs	Jupiter Calling	Folk	East West	
November 10	Evanescence	Synthesis	Electronica	BMG	
November 10	Greta Van Fleet	From the Fires	Hard rock, blues rock	Lava, Republic	
November 10	Kutless	Alpha / Omega		BEC	
November 10	Langhorne Slim	Lost at Last Vol. 1		Dualtone	
November 10	Pnau	Changa		etcetc	
November 10	Quicksand	Interiors	Post-hardcore	Epitaph	
November 10	Seal	Standards	Jazz, swing	Decca, Virgin EMI	
November 10	Sleigh Bells	Kid Kruschev	Noise pop	Torn Clean	
November 10	Spinning Coin	Permo		Geographic Music	
November 10	Taylor Swift	Reputation	Electropop, Synth-pop, R&B	Big Machine	
November 10	Tears for Fears	Rule the World: The Greatest Hits	Pop rock	Virgin EMI	
November 10	Walk the Moon	What If Nothing		RCA	
November 10	Yung Lean	Stranger	Hip-hop, cloud rap	YEAR0001	
November 17	Barenaked Ladies	Fake Nudes	Alternative rock	Vanguard	
November 17	Baths	Romaplasm	Electronica	Anticon	
November 17	Bob Seger	I Knew You When	Rock	Capitol	
November 17	The Body and Full of Hell	Ascending a Mountain of Heavy Light	Experimental metal	Thrill Jockey	
November 17	Charlotte Gainsbourg	Rest		Because Music, Atlantic	
November 17	Electric Wizard	Wizard Bloody Wizard	Doom metal, stoner metal	Spinefarm, Witchfinder Records	
November 17	Faith Hill and Tim McGraw	The Rest of Our Life	Country	Arista Nashville	
November 17	Godflesh	Post Self	Industrial metal	Avalanche	
November 17	Jaden	Syre	Alternative hip-hop, progressive rap	Roc Nation, Republic	
November 17	Jeremy Riddle	More	CCM, worship	Bethel Music	
November 17	Katharine McPhee	I Fall in Love Too Easily	Jazz	BMG	
November 17	King Gizzard & the Lizard Wizard	Polygondwanaland	Progressive rock, psychedelic rock, acid rock	ATO, Flightless	
November 17	Mavis Staples	If All I Was Was Black	R&B, soul	Anti-	
November 17	Mike Love	Unleash the Love	Pop, rock	BMG	
November 17	Morrissey	Low in High School		BMG	
November 17	Paloma Faith	The Architect	Pop, disco, R&B	RCA, Epic	
November 17	Red Velvet	Perfect Velvet	K-pop	SM, Dreamus, iRiver	
November 17	Sia	Everyday Is Christmas	Christmas	Monkey Puzzle, Atlantic	
November 17	Tove Lo	Blue Lips	Electropop, dance-pop	Island	
November 24	Björk	Utopia	Avant-garde, folktronica	One Little Indian	
November 24	Fabolous and Jadakiss	Friday on Elm Street	Hip-hop, horrorcore	Def Jam, Street Family, D-Block	
November 24	Hopsin	No Shame	Hip-hop	Undercover Prodigy, 300 Entertainment	
November 24	Loreen	Ride	Indie rock, pop rock, electronic	BMG	
November 24	Matt Terry	Trouble	Pop	Syco	
November 24	Noel Gallagher's High Flying Birds	Who Built the Moon?	Psychedelic rock	Sour Mash	
November 24	Sufjan Stevens	The Greatest Gift		Asthmatic Kitty	
November 29	B'z	Dinosaur	Hard rock, pop rock	Vermillion Records	

=== December ===
List of albums released in December 2017
Go to: January | February | March | April | May | June | July | August | September | October | November | December | Back to top
Release date	Artist	Album	Genre	Label	Ref.
December 1	Andy Grammer	The Good Parts		S-Curve, BMG	
December 1	Chris Stapleton	From A Room: Volume 2	Country, Southern rock, Southern soul	Mercury Nashville	
December 1	Danielle Bradbery	I Don't Believe We've Met	Country pop	Big Machine	
December 1	The Dear Hunter	All Is as All Should Be	Progressive rock, indie rock, experimental rock	Cave and Canary Goods	
December 1	Glassjaw	Material Control	Post-hardcore	Century Media	
December 1	Ha*Ash	30 de Febrero	Latin pop	Sony Music Latin	
December 1	Miguel	War & Leisure	R&B, psychedelic funk, pop	Bystorm, RCA	
December 1	Morbid Angel	Kingdoms Disdained	Death metal	Silver Lining Music, UDR Music	
December 1	Neil Young and Promise of the Real	The Visitor	Rock	Reprise	
December 1	Prurient	Rainbow Mirror	Noise, industrial, drone	Profound Lore	
December 1	U2	Songs of Experience	Pop rock	Island, Interscope	
December 1	Van Morrison	Versatile		Legacy, Caroline	
December 5	Project 86	Sheep Among Wolves	Christian rock, alternative rock, post-hardcore	Team Black Recordings	
December 8	Big Sean and Metro Boomin	Double or Nothing	Hip-hop, trap	GOOD Music, Def Jam, Republic	
December 8	Charles Hayward and Thurston Moore	Improvisations	Noise	Care in the Community	
December 8	Chris Thile	Thanks for Listening		Nonesuch	
December 8	Creeper	Christmas	Horror punk, punk rock, Christmas	Roadrunner	
December 8	Diablo Swing Orchestra	Pacifisticuffs	Avant-garde metal, swing revival, progressive metal	Candlelight, Spinefarm	
December 8	Juicy J	Rubba Band Business	Hip-hop, trap	Kemosabe, Columbia, Taylor Gang	
December 8	K. Michelle	Kimberly: The People I Used to Know	R&B, soul	Atlantic	
December 8	Luke Bryan	What Makes You Country	Country	Capitol Nashville	
December 8	Story of the Year	Wolves	Melodic hardcore		
December 8	Various artists	Control the Streets, Volume 1	Hip-hop	Motown, Capitol, Universal	
December 8	Various artists	The Greatest Showman	Pop	Atlantic	
December 8	Visible Cloaks	Lex	Ambient, experimental, electroacoustic	RVNG Intl.	
December 8	Walker Hayes	Boom	Country	Monument	
December 11	A Night in Texas	Global Slaughter	Deathcore		
December 11	Twice	Merry & Happy	K-pop, Christmas	JYP	
December 12	Taeyeon	This Christmas: Winter Is Coming	Christmas	SM	
December 13	Ryuichi Sakamoto	Async – Remodels		Commmons, Milan	
December 15	Asking Alexandria	Asking Alexandria	Hard rock, metalcore, post-hardcore	Sumerian	
December 15	Brockhampton	Saturation III	Alternative hip-hop	Question Everything, Inc. Empire	
December 15	Charli XCX	Pop 2	Experimental pop, dance-pop	Asylum	
December 15	Eminem	Revival	Hip-hop	Shady, Aftermath, Interscope	
December 15	G-Eazy	The Beautiful & Damned	Hip-hop	BPG, RVG, RCA	
December 15	Gabriel & Dresden	The Only Road	Progressive house, trance, downtempo	Anjunabeats	
December 15	Linkin Park	One More Light Live		Warner Bros., Machine Shop	
December 15	N.E.R.D.	No One Ever Really Dies	Hip-hop, experimental hip-hop, new wave	i Am Other, Columbia	
December 22	Gucci Mane	El Gato: The Human Glacier	Hip-hop, trap	GUWOP, 1017, Atlantic	
December 30	Conan Osiris	Adoro Bolos		AVNL Records	
December 31	King Gizzard & the Lizard Wizard	Gumboot Soup	Psychedelic rock, psychedelic pop, progressive rock	Flightless	
