= Keepsake =

Keepsake may refer to:

- Souvenir, an object a person acquires for the memories the owner associates with it
- Gift book, a 19th-century decorated book which collected essays, short fiction, and poetry
- Keepsake (band), an American emo/screamo band
- Keepsake (quartet), an American barbershop quartet
- Keepsake (video game), 2006
- Keepsake (Hatchie album), 2019
- Keepsake, a 2017 album by Heavy Heart
- Keepsake, a 2010 album by Kathy and Carol
- Keepsakes (album), by All About Eve, 2006
- "Keepsake", a song by The Gaslight Anthem from the 2012 album Handwritten
- The Keepsake, a literary annual 1828–1857
