= Hyacinth (album) =

Studio album by Spinning Coin
- Released: 21 February 2020
- Length: 41:44
- Label: Geographic

Spinning Coin chronology
Permo (2017)	Hyacinth (2020)

Singles from Hyacinth
- 1. "Feel You More Than World Right Now" Released: 7 November 2019; 2. "Ghosting" Released: 16 January 2020; 3. "Get High" Released: 19 February 2020

Professional ratings
Aggregate scores
Source	Rating
Metacritic	75/100
Review scores
Source	Rating
AllMusic	4.5/5 stars
DIY	3/5 stars
Exclaim!	8/10
PopMatters	7/10
The Skinny	4/5 stars
Under the Radar	4/10 stars

Hyacinth is the second studio album by Scottish indie rock band Spinning Coin. It was released on 21 February 2020 through Geographic Music.

== Track listing ==
Hyacinth track listing
No.	Title	Length
1.	"Avenues of Spring"	3:15
2.	"Feel You More Than World Right Now"	2:33
3.	"Get High"	3:09
4.	"The Long Heights"	3:18
5.	"Despotic Sway"	4:30
6.	"Ghosting"	3:32
7.	"Laughing Ways"	2:46
8.	"Black Cat"	2:49
9.	"Soul Trader"	2:40
10.	"Never Enough"	3:10
11.	"Slips Away"	2:44
12.	"It's Alright"	4:19
13.	"Things of the Past"	2:53
Total length:		41:44
