= Nina Rodríguez (album) =

Studio album by Nina Rodríguez
- Released: June 12, 2013
- Recorded: 2012–2013
- Genre: Pop, indie pop, jazz pop
- Length: 42:07
- Label: Indie
- Producer: Ernesto Santos

Nina Rodríguez chronology
Nina Rodríguez (2013)	Heroína (2017)

Singles from Nina Rodríguez
- 1. "Búscame Un Doctor" Released: 2013

Nina Rodríguez is the self-titled debut studio album by Colombian singer-songwriter Nina Rodríguez, released on June 12, 2013.

== Track listing ==
All tracks are written by Nina Rodríguez, except where noted

No.	Title	Writer(s)	Length
1.	"Búscame un Doctor"	Nina Rodríguez, Ernesto Santos, S. Gonzalez	3:31
2.	"Miento"		3:40
3.	"Me Niego"	Nina Rodríguez, Santiago Cruz	3:50
4.	"Por Ti"		3:52
5.	"Días"		3:56
6.	"Nubes"		3:56
7.	"No Quiero"	Nina Rodríguez, Ernesto Santos	4:08
8.	"Crimen"	Gustavo Cerati	3:54
9.	"Me Elevo"		3:35
10.	"Inevitable"		3:27
11.	"Tres Palabras"	Nina Rodríguez, Ernesto Santos	4:18
