= Holographic Violence =

Studio album by Grave Babies
- Released: July 24, 2017
- Genres: Gothic rock; darkwave
- Length: 39:44
- Label: Hardly Art

Grave Babies chronology
Crusher (2013)	Holographic Violence (2015)

Holographic Violence is an album by American rock band Grave Babies. It was released on July 24, 2017, through Sub Pop-affiliated Hardly Art record label. It is the band's first album to be recorded in a studio.

== Music and composition ==
Cameron Cook of Pitchfork regarded the album as a transition from band's previous garage rock sound in favor of gothic rock influences. The A.V. Club critic Chris Mincher stated: "Documenting that exploration, Holographic Violence sifts through various ’80s dark-wave styles in the hunt for worthy concepts, finding serviceable elements of goth-rock, post-punk, grunge, alt-metal, and industrial electronica." AllMusic's Paul Simpson wrote: "While still dark and dingy, the relatively cleaner production brings the group closer to sounding like its '80s deathrock heroes, while the overly dramatic bent and tongue-in-cheek song titles like "Pain Iz Pleasure" recall a less metal, lower-budget version of Type O Negative." Simpson also noted that "the group isn't stuck in the past (be it the goth '80s, the alt-metal '90s, or the late-2000s lo-fi cassette boom) by including a few up-to-date production effects, particularly the subtle influence of trap-style beats on the drum machine programming." According to The Irish Times' "Taking as their base of reference the still-in-fashion 1980s blend of post-punk (The Cure) and goth-rock (Sisters of Mercy) – with hints of Nine Inch Nails and Nirvana."

== Critical reception ==
Professional ratings
Review scores
Source	Rating
AllMusic	3/5 stars
The A.V. Club	B−
The Irish Times	3/5 stars
Pitchfork	6.4/10

The album generally received positive reviews from music critics. AllMusic's Paul Simpson wrote: "The overall result is a forward-looking album drawing from dark, foreboding sounds from the past, and it's a decent, spooky listen, if a bit hard to take seriously at times." The A.V. Club critic Chris Mincher commented: "Taking a more airy, atmospheric approach than its pummeling predecessors, Holographic Violence strives for melodic melancholy, yet can’t resist breaking out the occasional bright, shimmery hook or synth flourish" The Irish Times's Tony Clayton-Lea stated: "Founding member Danny Wahlfeldt has taken it upon himself to tackle all of the songwriting, and while there are sci-fi concept themes here that are too oppressive if not ordinary (the usual unholy trinity of dystopia, nihilism and misanthropy), at least the music mostly makes up for it." Cameron Cook of Pitchfork wrote: "In the end, though, Violence comes off as transitional, a building block for a bigger, darker, blacker record that may be in Grave Babies' future."

== Track listing ==
1. "Eternal (On & On)" – 4:39
2. "Beautiful Lie" – 3:33
3. "Try 2 Try" – 4:54
4. "Something Awful" – 3:47
5. "Punishment (Only a Victim)" – 4:40
6. "Metal Me" – 1:37
7. "Pain Iz Pleasure" – 3:17
8. "Positive Aggression" – 3:19
9. "N2 Ether" – 2:44
10. "Concrete Cell" – 3:54
11. "War" – 3:20
