= Grave Babies =

American rock band

- Origin: Seattle, Washington, U.S.
- Genres: Gothic rock; darkwave; garage rock; noise rock; lo-fi
- Years active: 2009–present
- Labels: Skrot Up; Hardly Art
- Members: Alex Noelke; Emily Gorman; Danny Wahlfeldt
- Past members: Claire Haranda; Mark Gajadhar; Bryce Brown; Tyler Robinson; Keith Whiteman; Mitch Saulsberry

Grave Babies is an American rock band formed in 2009 in Seattle, Washington. The band consists of Emily Gorman (harmonizing vocals), Alex Noelke (bass), and Danny Wahlfeldt (vocals, guitar). The band released its latest album, Holographic Violence, in 2015 through Sub Pop-affiliated label Hardly Art.

== History ==
The band started out in 2009 as a home recording project of Danny Wahlfeldt with keyboardist Tyler Robinson. Bassist Mitch Saulsberry and drummer Keith Whiteman joined up for live shows, and the band released its debut, Deathface, on Denmark-based label Skrot Up. After signing up to Hardly Art for a couple singles, the band released Crusher in 2013. Wahlfeldt recorded the band's next record, Holographic Violence, with drummer Mark Gajadhar at his studio in Orcas Island, Washington. Bryce Brown played bass, and the album was mixed by Matt Bayles and mastered by Chris Common. Grave Babies subsequently went on hiatus in the fall of 2015, reforming in the fall of 2019 with new music and live performances expected.

== Musical style ==
Grave Babies' sound has been described as "lo-fi goth" and darkwave. The band's early work was called as "half post-industrial, half-oily garage" and "tensely abrasive, home-recorded lo-fi sludge". With the release of 2015's Holographic Violence, the band adopted a gothic rock sound in favor of their previous garage rock inspired style, incorporating elements from new wave, post-punk, grunge, alternative metal, and industrial electronica.

== Members ==
=== Current members ===
- Emily Gorman - vocals
- Alex Noelke - bass guitar
- Danny Wahlfeldt - vocals, guitar

=== Past members ===
- Claire Haranda - synthesizer, keyboards
- Mark Gajadhar - drums
- Bryce Brown - bass guitar
- Tyler Robinson - synthesizer, keyboards
- Keith Whiteman - drums
- Mitch Saulsberry - bass guitar

== Discography ==
=== Albums ===
- Deathface (2009)
- Blood Skull (2011)
- Crusher (2013)
- Holographic Violence (2015)
- Death Will Kill Us All (2023)

=== EPs ===
- Gothdammit (2012)

=== Singles ===
- "Gouge Your Eyes Out" (2010)
- "Pleasures" (2011)
- "Eternal (On & On)" (2015)
- "Casket Shuts" (2020)
