= Nina Rodríguez =

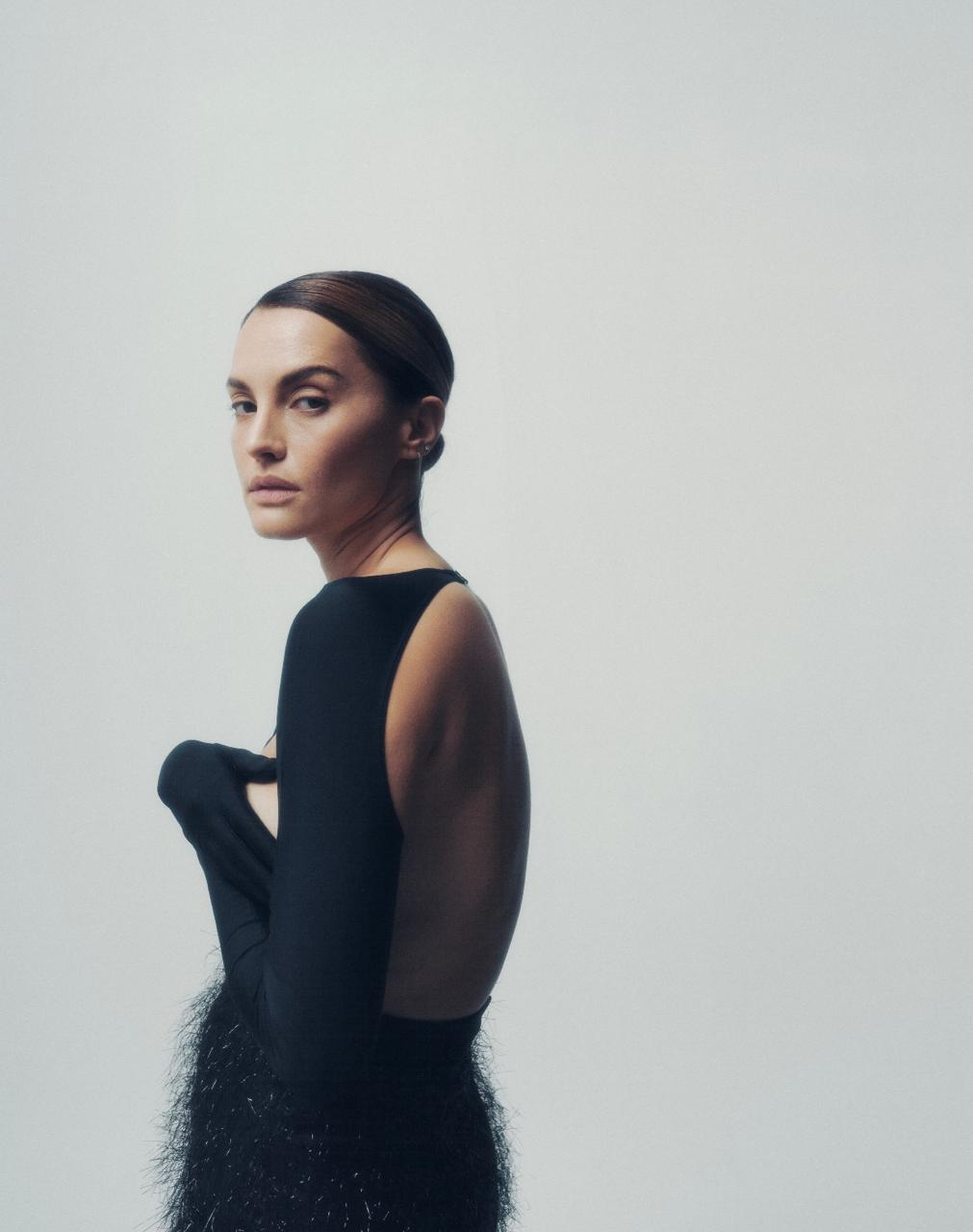
- Nina Rodríguez in 2026

Background information
- Born: Carolina Rodríguez; 15 July 1985 (age 41); Bogotá, Colombia
- Genres: Pop; alternative pop; jazz
- Occupation: Singer-songwriter
- Years active: 2013–present
- Label: Indie
- Website: ninarodriguezmusic.com

Carolina Rodríguez Ferrero (born 15 July 1985), better known as Nina Rodríguez, is a Colombian pop singer-songwriter.

== Musical career ==
In 2013, Rodríguez launched her solo music career with the release of her self-titled debut studio album, Nina Rodríguez, supported by the lead single "Búscame Un Doctor". Later that year, she gained wider recognition as a contestant on the second season of the vocal competition series La Voz Colombia. In 2014, she relocated to Miami, releasing the indie-flavored single "Duelo". Following the release of "Como Respirar" (2015), she released her second studio album, Heroína (2017).

In 2020, Rodríguez released her third and fourth studio albums, Ficciones Vol. 1 and Ficciones Vol. 2. In December 2022, she was featured in Forbes Colombia. In October 2023, she released her fifth studio album, Mis Santos, with a collaborative launch performance alongside several Colombian public figures. In December 2025, Rodríguez released the extended play Interludio.

Rodríguez has contributed as a cultural columnist for Revista Alternativa, publishing a series of 12 columns focused on art, society, and culture. In October 2023, she was invited by Chanel to attend its runway show in Paris. In December 2025, she was featured on the cover of Noir Magazine.

== Discography ==
=== Studio albums ===
Title	Album details
Nina Rodríguez	Released: 12 June 2013; Label: Independent; Format: Digital download, CD
Heroína	Released: 17 March 2017; Label: Independent; Format: Digital download, CD
Mis Santos	Released: 23 May 2023; Label: Independent; Format: Digital download
Interludio	Released: 21 Nov 2025; Label: Independent; Format: Digital download

=== Extended plays ===
Title	Album details
Ficciones, Vol I	Released: 13 March 2020; Label: Arbol Naranja; Format: Digital download
Ficciones, Vol II	Released: 20 March 2020; Label: Arbol Naranja; Format: Digital download

== Singles ==
Year	Song	Peak chart positions	Album
Year	Song	COL National-Report	Album
2013	"Búscame Un Doctor"	–	Nina Rodríguez
2014	"Duelo"	-	
2016	"Como Respirar"	–	Heroína
2017	"Heroína"	–	Heroína
2017	"Campo Minado"	–	Heroína
2019	"Destino"	–	Ficciones Vol. I
2019	"Sweet Lover"	–	Ficciones Vol. I
2019	"Como Respirar (Live Session)"	–	
2019	"Quédate"	–	Ficciones Vol. I
2019	"Gravedad"	–	Ficciones Vol. I
2019	"Feel Better (feat. Nanpa Básico)"	–	Ficciones Vol. I
2019	"Hechos de Lo Mismo"	–	Ficciones Vol. II
2020	"Río"	–	Ficciones Vol. II
2020	"Fuego"	-	
2020	"Luna Blanca"	-	
2020	"Guerra"	-	
"—" denotes releases that did not chart or were not released.

== Music videos ==
Title	Year
"Búscame Un Doctor"	2013
"Duelo"	2014
"Como Respirar"	2016
"Heroína"	2017
"Campo Minado"	2017
"Veneno (Live Session)"	2017
"Destino (Live Session)"	2019
"Sweet Lover (Live Session)"	2019
"Como Respirar (Live Session)"	2019
"Quédate"	2019
"Gravedad"	2019
"Feel Better"	2019
"Hechos de lo Mismo"	2020
"Fuego"	2020
"Luna Blanca"	2020
