= Grayson/Reed =

American Christian music duo

Grayson|Reed
- Origin: Nashville, Tennessee
- Genres: Christian pop; Christian rock; worship; pop rock
- Years active: 2016–present
- Labels: Centricity
- Members: Mike Grayson; Molly Reed
- Website: graysonreedmusic.com

Grayson|Reed is an American Christian music duo from Nashville, Tennessee that started making music in 2016. They released an extended play, Walk, with Centricity Music in 2017. This release charted on two Billboard magazine charts.

== Background ==
Grayson|Reed is a husband-and-wife duo based in Nashville, Tennessee, where the husband, Mike Grayson, was the lead singer with Mikeschair, and the wife, Molly Reed, was half of the group City Harbor.

== Music history ==
Their first release, an extended play entitled Walk, was released on January 13, 2017, with Centricity Music. It charted on two Billboard magazine charts, where it peaked on the Christian Albums chart at No. 21, and No. 12 on the Heatseekers Albums chart.

== Members ==
- Michael Alan "Mike" Grayson (born October 21, 1984, Orlando, Florida)
- Molly Elizabeth Reed Grayson (born February 5, 1985, East Aurora, New York)

== Discography ==
EPs

List of studio albums, with selected chart positions
Title	Album details	Peak chart positions	
Title	Album details	US CHR	US HEAT
Walk	Released: January 13, 2017; Label: Centricity; Format: CD, download	21	12
