= Spinning Coin (band) =

Scottish Indie rock band

- Origin: Glasgow, Scotland
- Genres: Indie rock, art rock
- Years active: 2014–present
- Labels: Geographic Music
- Members: Sean Armstrong; Jack Mellin; Rachel Taylor; Chris White
- Past members: Cal Donnelly

Spinning Coin are a Scottish indie rock band formed in Glasgow in 2014. They are signed to the Domino Records imprint Geographic Music, which is run by Stephen Pastel. Their first album Permo was released in 2017, and the follow-up Hyacinth was released in 2020.

Their debut cassette was released in 2015, which caught the attention of Geographic Music. They have toured with Teenage Fanclub and recorded with Edwyn Collins.

== Discography ==
=== Studio albums ===
- Permo (2017)
- Hyacinth (2020)

=== Singles ===
- Spinning Coin (2015) (cassette released by Winning Sperm Party)
- Spinning Coin (2015) (cassette released by Fuzzkill Records)
- Spinning Coin (2016) (self-released cassette)
- Albany / Sides (2016)
- Raining on Hope Street (2017)
- Sleepless (2017)
- Feel You More Than World Right Now (2019)
- Visions At The Stars (2019)
- Every Law / The Joker / The Theme (2020)
