= Condition (album) =

Studio album by Spectres
- Released: 10 March 2017
- Label: Sonic Cathedral

Spectres chronology
Dying (2015)	Condition (2017)	Dark Habits 11 & Death Kettled LP (2019)

Professional ratings
Aggregate scores
Source	Rating
AnyDecentMusic?	7.1/10
Metacritic	81/100
Review scores
Source	Rating
AllMusic	3.5/5 stars
Crack Magazine	7/10
Drowned in Sound	8/10
The Line of Best Fit	7/10
Loud and Quiet	8/10
Mojo	4/5 stars
Q	4/5 stars
Record Collector	3/5 stars
SoundBlab	10/10
Uncut	8/10

Condition is the second studio album of British band Spectres, released on 10 March 2017 on the label Sonic Cathedral. It was tracked by Dominic Mitchison in Bristol and mastered by Mogwai and 65daysofstatic client Frank Arkwright at Abbey Road Studios. The album was positively received.

== Track list ==
No.	Title	Length
1.	"The Beginning of an End"	5:03
2.	"Rubber Plant"	2:53
3.	"Dissolve"	7:48
4.	"Neck"	3:32
5.	"A Fish Called Wanda"	6:17
6.	"Welcoming the Flowers"	3:50
7.	"Colour Me Out"	8:59
8.	"End Waltz"	3:33
9.	"Coping Mechanism"	6:59
