= Heroína (album) =

Studio album by Nina Rodríguez
- Released: 17 March 2017
- Recorded: 2015–2017, Nebula Studio, Bogotá
- Genre: Alternative pop, jazz, soul, funk, trip-hop
- Length: 31:31
- Label: Indie
- Producer: Nina Rodríguez, Mauricio García, Juan Galeano

Nina Rodríguez chronology
| Nina Rodríguez (2013) | Heroína (2017) | Ficciones Vol. 1 (2020) |

Singles from Heroína
- 1. "Como Respirar" Released: September 2, 2016; 2. "Heroína" Released: March 31, 2017; 3. "Campo Minado" Released: September 10, 2017

Heroína (transl. Heroine) is the second studio album by Colombian singer-songwriter Nina Rodríguez, released on March 17, 2017. The album received critical acclaim from the music press, earning praise for its alternative sound and Nina songwriting and emotive singing style.

== Track listing ==
All tracks are written by Nina Rodríguez.

| No. | Title | Length |
|---|---|---|
| 1. | "Campo Minado (Minefield)" | 3:36 |
| 2. | "Como Respirar (Like Breathing)" | 4:25 |
| 3. | "Heroína (Heroine)" | 3:38 |
| 4. | "Inocente/Pecador (Innocent/Sinner)" | 4:08 |
| 5. | "Aire-Agua-Fuego-Tierra (Air-Water-Fire-Dust)" | 4:10 |
| 6. | "Espejo (Mirror)" | 4:11 |
| 7. | "Veneno (Poison)" | 4:03 |
| 8. | "Cicatrices (Scars)" | 3:19 |
