= Permo =

Studio album by Spinning Coin
- Released: 10 November 2017
- Length: 39:13
- Label: Geographic

Spinning Coin chronology
Permo (2017)	Hyacinth (2020)

Singles from Permo
- 1. "Raining on Hope Street" Released: 7 February 2017; 2. "Tin" Released: 13 March 2017

Professional ratings
Aggregate scores
Source	Rating
AnyDecentMusic?	6.9/10
Metacritic	75/100
Review scores
Source	Rating
AllMusic	4/5 stars
DIY	4/5 stars
The Guardian	4/5 stars
The Line of Best Fit	7/10
Loud and Quiet	5/10
The Skinny	4/5 stars

Permo is the debut studio album by Scottish indie rock band Spinning Coin. It was released on 10 November 2017 through Geographic Music.

== Track listing ==
Permo track listing
No.	Title	Length
1.	"Raining on Hope Street"	02:24
2.	"Tin"	2:39
3.	"Money for Breakfast"	2:27
4.	"Money Is a Drug"	2:32
5.	"Metronome River"	2:12
6.	"Magdalene"	2:59
7.	"Floating with You"	3:22
8.	"Be Free"	2:27
9.	"Sides"	3:12
10.	"Sleepless"	2:08
11.	"Powerful"	3:01
12.	"Starry Eyes"	2:40
13.	"Running with the World"	3:44
14.	"I Feel the Need to Be an Actor"	3:20
Total length:		39:13
