= No Home of the Mind =

Studio album by Bing & Ruth
- Released: February 17, 2017
- Studio: Future-Past Studios, New York
- Length: 59:17
- Label: 4AD
- Producer: Brian Bender, David Moore

Bing & Ruth chronology
Tomorrow Was the Golden Age (2014)	No Home of the Mind (2017)

No Home of the Mind is the third studio album by American ensemble Bing & Ruth. It was released in February 2017 under 4AD.

Professional ratings
Aggregate scores
Source	Rating
Metacritic	81/100
Review scores
Source	Rating
AllMusic	4/5 stars
Pitchfork	8.2/10
Slant Magazine	4/5 stars

== Track listing ==
No.	Title	Length
1.	"Starwood Choker"	6:16
2.	"As Much as Possible"	5:40
3.	"Scrapes"	5:18
4.	"Chonchos"	4:58
5.	"The How of It Sped"	5:47
6.	"Is Drop"	5:51
7.	"Form Takes"	6:23
8.	"To All It"	6:02
9.	"Flat Line/Peak Color"	6:50
10.	"What Ash It Flow Up"	6:12
