= Bing & Ruth =

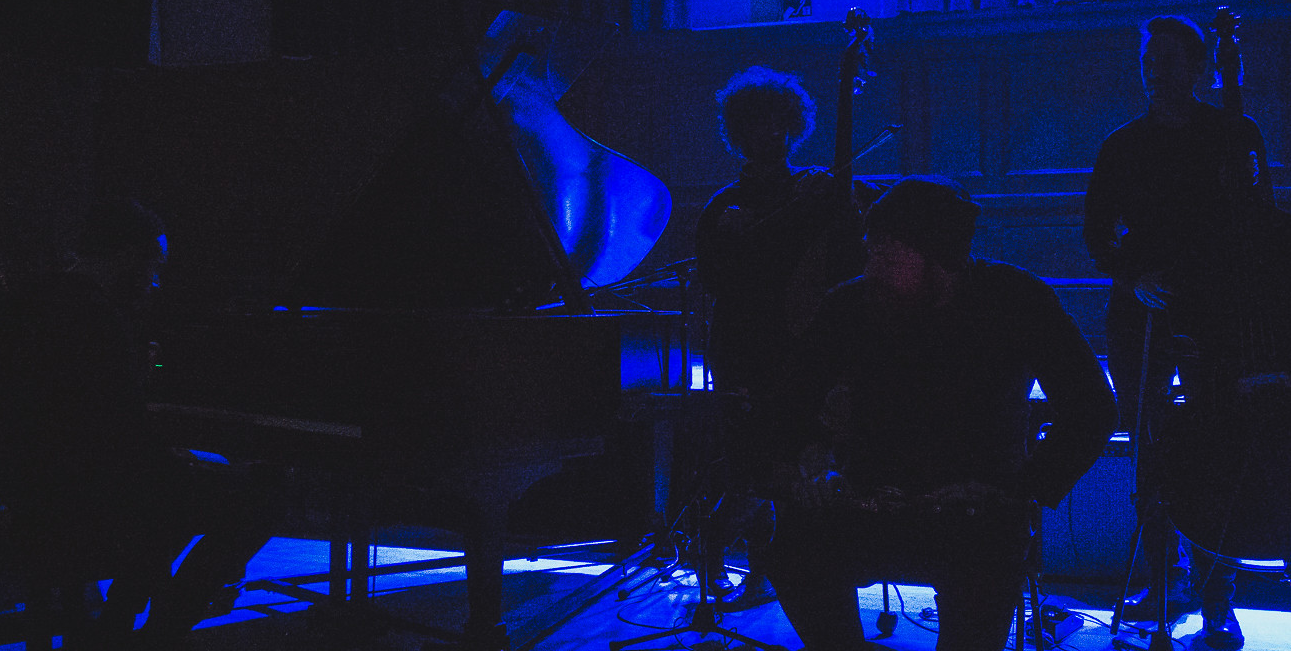
- Performing in 2016.

Background information
- Genres: minimalism; ambient
- Years active: 2006–present

Bing & Ruth is an American minimalist/ambient music ensemble from Brooklyn, led by pianist David Moore.

== History ==
=== Formation ===
In 2006, David Moore started Bing & Ruth to bring his music outside of academia. As a student at The New School for Jazz in New York City, Moore wanted to write "minimalist ensemble music with a certain filmic sensitivity, one that prioritized grace and texture over the style’s once-radical subtraction." Moore named the band after two characters from the 1980 short story "Daylight Come" by Amy Hempel.

=== City Lake (2010) and Tomorrow Was The Golden Age (2014) ===
Bing & Ruth's first album, City Lake, was self-released in 2010 in a run of 250 physical copies. The ensemble featured eleven members, making touring and rehearsals difficult to coordinate.

While facing financial and logistical issues associated with selling self-released vinyl out of his basement, Moore was put in touch with experimental label RVNG Intl. In 2014, Bing & Ruth signed with the label RVNG Intl. and issued Tomorrow Was the Golden Age; the following year, they reissued City Lake in a larger print run.

Tomorrow Was The Golden Age saw the group pare down to a seven-person ensemble composed of a pianist, two clarinetists, two bassists, a cellist and a tape-delay operator. The group sought to "reviv[e] interest in the meditative pop traditions of Philip Glass and Harold Budd." Pitchfork called it, "one of the finest left-field releases of the year" and included it on their list of the "Top 50 Ambient Albums of All Time" in 2016.

=== No Home of the Mind (2017) ===
In 2016, Bing & Ruth signed with 4AD and announced the release of their new album No Home of the Mind in February 2017.

No Home of the Mind was written on seventeen pianos across North America and Europe over numerous sessions, tours, and travel and recorded in Hudson, NY in 2016. The self-contained pieces were arranged for a five-person ensemble. The album was recorded in two days at a repurposed church in Hudson, NY in the fewest takes possible in order to "capture the immediacy of classic session-style musicianship, where one-take recordings were a standard to keep costs down."

=== Species (2020) ===
On July 17, 2020, Bing & Ruth released their new album Species with 4AD.

== Discography ==
- City Lake - 2010
- Backward Music, Vol. 1 (with Joshua Van Tassel and Tim Crabtree) - 2012
- Tomorrow Was The Golden Age - 2014
- No Home of the Mind - 2017
- Species - 2020

== Members ==
- David Moore – piano
- Jeremy Viner – clarinet
- Mike Effenberger – tape delay
- Jeff Ratner – bass
- Greg Chudzick – bass

== Former members ==
- Patrick Breiner – clarinet
- Leigh Stuart – cello
