= Walk (Grayson/Reed EP) =

EP by Grayson|Reed
- Released: January 13, 2017
- Genres: Christian pop; Christian rock; worship; pop rock
- Length: 19:08
- Label: Centricity

Walk is the first extended play and debut recording from the husband-and-wife duo Grayson|Reed. Centricity Music released the EP on January 13, 2016, while this was their first release with the label.

== Critical reception ==
Professional ratings
Review scores
Source	Rating
365 Days of Inspiring Media	4.5/5 stars
CCM Magazine	4.25/5 stars
Jesus Freak Hideout	4.5/5 stars
Louder Than the Music	4.5/5 stars
New Release Today	4/5 stars
The Phantom Tollbooth	4/5 stars
Today's Christian Entertainment	4.6/5 stars
Worship Leader	5/5 stars

Kevin Sparkman says "their music and message are both worth the attention". Jay Akins writes "I love this record; it's a great everyday listen or road trip album." Marie Asner states "it shows in the timing, arrangements and lyrics of their music". Nicole Marie Vacca says "Listeners who take on Walk will not regret it." Caitlin Lassiter writes "it's also a completely new sound that displays the duo's own style and shows how well Mike and Molly mesh musically." Brian Hunter states "The album is produced and mixed very professionally and really let's both voices shine." Jono Davies says "It's a great record, well worth investing time in." Jonathan Andre writes "Yet in the same breath, Mike and Molly have complemented each other so seamlessly and poetically on the EP that I can't help by enjoy and love the duo."

== Track listing ==
No.	Title	Writer(s)	Length
1.	"Walk"	Robby Earle, Justin Ebach, Molly Reed	2:55
2.	"Bloom"	Ben Glover, Mike Grayson, Reed	2:48
3.	"Fight for You"	Grayson, Jeff Pardo, Reed	3:26
4.	"Can't Get Enough"	Ebach, Grayson, Reed	2:56
5.	"Be Revealed"	Mia Fieldes, Grayson, Seth Mosley, Reed	3:22
6.	"How This Ends"	Josh Kerr, Reed, Emily Weisband	3:41
Total length:			19:08

== Charts ==
Chart (2016)	Peak position
US Top Christian Albums (Billboard)	21
US Heatseekers Albums (Billboard)	12
