= Heavy Heart (band) =

- Origin: New Cross, London, England
- Genres: Alternative rock, indie rock, dream pop, shoegaze
- Years active: 2014–present
- Labels: AWAL, I Can & I Will
- Members: Anna Vincent; James Vincent; Patrick Fitzroy; Craig Brown
- Past members: Adam Williams
- Website: Official website

Heavy Heart are a British alternative rock band formed in 2014 in London. They are notable for writing, recording and releasing a new song each month of 2016, all of which then appeared on their 2017 debut Keepsake.

== History ==
Heavy Heart was initially formed at the start of 2014 in south-east London as a three-piece by Anna Vincent (vocals, guitar), James Vincent (guitar) and Patrick Fitzroy (guitar). They expanded the line-up later that year with the addition of Adam Williams (bass guitar) and Craig Brown (drums).

The band self-released a demo cassette tape in 2014, following this in 2016 with a project which involved writing, recording and releasing a new song online every month throughout the year. All twelve songs formed a full-length vinyl collection entitled Keepsake which was released in March 2017 by London-based independent record label, I Can & I Will and digitally by AWAL.

Heavy Heart appeared live at 2015's CMJ Music Marathon in New York City, also performing at MBC Fest in Valencia, Spain and Truck Festival in Oxford, UK.

The band have received radio support from Tom Robinson at BBC Radio 6 Music, Gary Crowley at BBC Radio London and Charlie Ashcroft at Amazing Radio in the UK, as well as in the USA on WMFO (Medford, MA), DKFM (Fresno, CA), 913 The Summit (Akron, OH), WJCU (Cleveland, OH), 106.1 The Corner (Charlottesville, VA), and WVPB (Charleston, WV).

Their music was described by NME as "a graceful and rewarding listen" and by The Line of Best Fit as "lush alt-rock", whilst The Revue included the band in their Artists to Watch in 2017 feature, saying they had "an intoxicating rock formula with a 90s slant".

== Members ==
=== Current ===
- Anna Vincent – lead vocals, guitar (2014–present)
- Patrick Fitzroy – guitar, backing vocals, synths (2014–present)
- James Vincent – guitar, backing vocals (2014–present)
- Craig Brown – drums (2014–present)

=== Former ===
- Adam Williams – bass (2014–2017)

== Discography ==
=== Albums ===
Title	Details
Keepsake	Released 31 March 2017; Label: I Can & I Will, AWAL; Format: CD, DL, LP

=== EPs ===
This Season – EP (2014)

=== Singles ===
Year	Single	Album
2017	Fruitfly	Keepsake
2019	Bed Bug	non-album single
2019	Dowsabel	non-album single
2019	Cry Ice	non-album single
