= Tim Hecker discography =

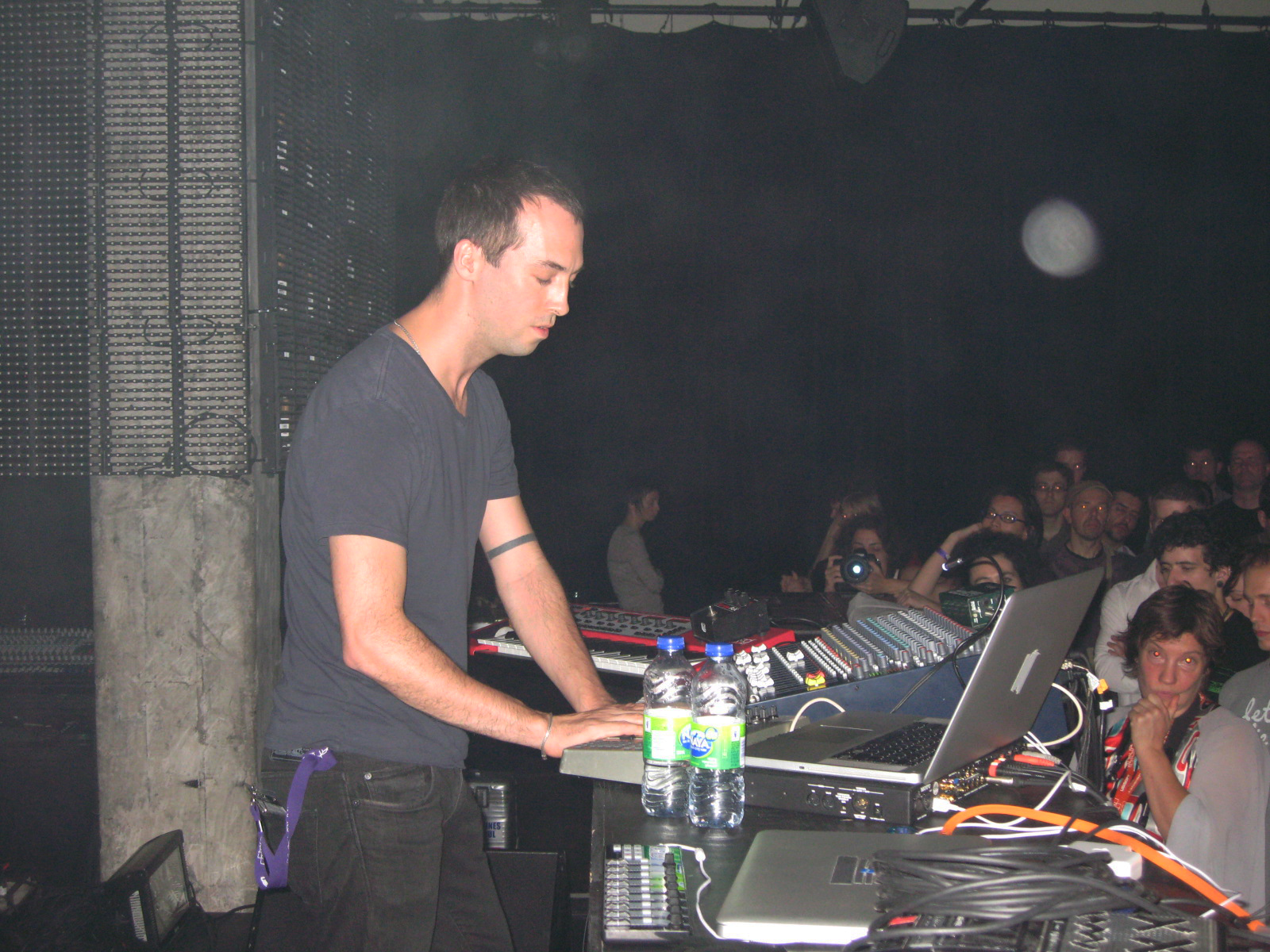
- Tim Hecker performing in 2010
- Studio albums: 15
- EPs: 4
- Soundtrack albums: 2
- Live albums: 1
- Compilation albums: 1
- Singles: 14
- Music videos: 3

The discography of Canadian electronic music musician Tim Hecker is composed of fifteen studio albums, four extended plays (EPs), two soundtrack albums, one compilation, fourteen singles, and three music videos. (Note: This counts for both of his aliases.) Hecker debuted under the pseudonym Jetone in 1996, though with an unknown release. His first release under his real name was the album Haunt Me, Haunt Me Do It Again in 2001, and his last release under Jetone was in 2006, with EP Sundown. Three of his albums have charted in the Top Dance Albums, those being Ravedeath, 1972 in 2011, Virgins in 2013, and Love Streams in 2016. In the UK Albums Chart, only Love Streams has charted.

== As Tim Hecker ==
=== Solo studio albums ===
Title	Details	Peak Chart Positions	
Title	Details	US Dance	UK
Haunt Me, Haunt Me Do It Again	Released: November 20, 2001; Label: Substractif	—	—
Radio Amor	Released: March 25, 2003; Label: Mille Plateaux	—	—
Mirages	Released: September 21, 2004; Label: Alien8	—	—
Harmony in Ultraviolet	Released: October 16, 2006; Label: Kranky	—	—
An Imaginary Country	Released: March 10, 2009; Label: Kranky	—	—
Ravedeath, 1972	Released: February 7, 2011; Label: Kranky	17	—
Virgins	Released: October 14, 2013; Label: Kranky	13	—
Love Streams	Released: April 8, 2016; Label: 4AD and Paper Bag Records	2	97
Konoyo	Released: September 28, 2018; Label: Kranky	—	—
Anoyo	Released: May 10, 2019; Label: Kranky	—	—
No Highs	Released: April 7, 2023; Label: Kranky	—	—
"—" denotes items which did not chart in that territory.

=== Collaborative studio albums ===
Title	Details
Fantasma Parastasie (with Aidan Baker)	Released: October 14, 2008; Label: Alien8
Instrumental Tourist (with Daniel Lopatin)	Released: November 20, 2012; Label: Software Recording Co.

=== Live albums ===
- Mort Aux Vaches (Staalplaat, 2005) (Note: Made for the collection of albums of the same name, which is by label Staalplaat.)

=== Soundtrack albums ===
Title	Details
The North Water	Released: September 10, 2021; Label: Invada and Lakeshore Records
Infinity Pool	Released: January 27, 2023; Label: Milan Records

=== EPs ===
Title	Details
My Love Is Rotten to the Core	Released: June 25, 2002; Label: Substractif
Dropped Pianos	Released: October 10, 2011; Label: Kranky
Shards	Released: February 21, 2025; Label: Kranky

=== Compilations ===
- Norberg/Apondalifa (Room40, 2015)

=== Singles ===
Title	Year	Album/EP	Ref.
"Hatred of Music I"	2011	Ravedeath, 1972	
"Sketch 5"	2011	Dropped Pianos	
"Black Refraction"	2013	Virgins	
"Live Room"	2013	Virgins	
"Stigmata I"	2013	Virgins	
"Virginal II" (Note: Stylized as "Virginal ll" ("II" is with two Ls) on SoundCloud.)	2013	Virgins	
"Castrati Stack"	2016	Love Streams	
"Black Phase"	2016	Love Streams	
"This Life"	2018	Konoyo	
"Keyed Out"	2018	Konoyo	
"That World"	2019	Anoyo	
"You Never Were"	2019	Anoyo	
"Lotus Light"	2023	No Highs	
"Sunset Key Melt"	2025	Shards	

=== Music videos ===
Title	Year	Director	Album	Ref.
"Black Refraction"	2013	Sabrina Ratté	Virgins	
"Castrati Stack"	2016	Brett Stabler	Love Streams	
"Black Phase"	2016	Brett Stabler	Love Streams	

== As Jetone ==
=== Studio albums ===
Title	Details
Autumnmonia	Released: 2000; Label: Pitchcadet
Ultramarin	Released: 2001; Label: Force Inc.

=== EPs ===
- Sundown (Apnea, 2006)
