= Harmony in Ultraviolet =

2006 studio album by Tim Hecker

Studio album by Tim Hecker
- Released: October 16, 2006
- Recorded: 2005–2006
- Genre: Experimental; electronica; ambient; glitch
- Length: 49:54
- Label: Kranky

Tim Hecker chronology
Mirages (2004)	Harmony in Ultraviolet (2006)	An Imaginary Country (2009)

Harmony in Ultraviolet is the fourth studio album by the Canadian electronic musician Tim Hecker. It was recorded in two years, and released on October 16, 2006, via Kranky. Described as ambient and experimental, it uses instruments including electric guitars, pipe organs, and keyboards, along with distortion and samples. With fifteen tracks, sounds change throughout them. The cover art depicts a memorial in Bologna about the Italian Resistance.

Harmony in Ultraviolet received positive reviews from magazines such as Pitchfork, PopMatters, and Tiny Mix Tapes. Critics focused on the structure of it, and comparisons were made to Hecker's earlier works and On Land by Brian Eno. It would appear in several rankings, including one from Pitchfork as the ninth best ambient album of all time.

== Background ==
Tim Hecker is a Montreal-based musician known for his work in ambient music. He debuted under the name Jetone in 1996, and released techno. Under his real name, Hecker released the albums Haunt Me, Haunt Me Do It Again (2001), Radio Amor (2003), and Mirages (2004) before Harmony in Ultraviolet. His sound was influenced by rock and releases from Warp Records, including the works of Aphex Twin and Autechre. His works have been positively received by critics.

== Release and artwork ==
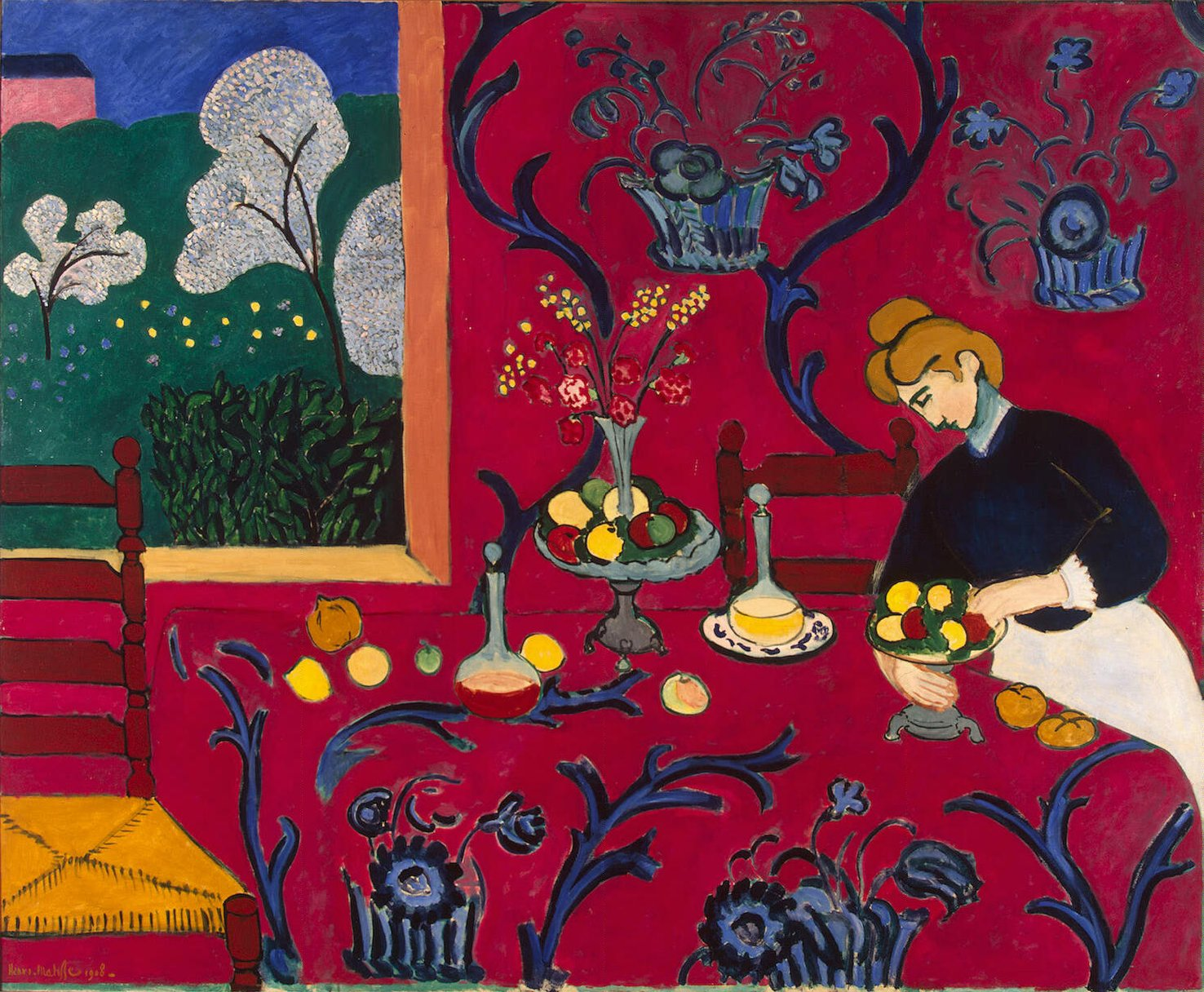
Harmony in Red (1908), the painting which the title references

Harmony in Ultraviolet was recorded from 2005 to 2006 in Montreal and Banff, Alberta. It was released on October 16, 2006, through Kranky, and was the first album of his to be released on the label. The album was distributed by CD and vinyl. Hecker would say in an interview that it was difficult choosing a record label, since he knew a large number of them, though he was interested in Kranky years before Harmony in Ultraviolet. The title of the album is a reference to Harmony in Red, a 1908 painting by Henri Matisse. Ultraviolet was chosen as ultraviolet radiation is invisible. The narrative of Harmony in Ultraviolet is more abstract and changed multiple times as production took place. Hecker would later say that it was about the process of making an album.

The cover art is a photograph taken by Hecker of the Monument to Fallen Partisans, an anti-fascist memorial in Bologna. Located in Piazza Maggiore, it commemorates soldiers who fought as a part of the Italian Resistance. Hecker said that the memorial was chosen for its crude qualities and how he felt that it matched with the music.

== Composition ==
Harmony in Ultraviolet has been described as experimental, electronica, ambient, and glitch. Critics have described it as loud and dense. It has electric guitars, pipe organs, string instruments, and keyboards, alongside distortion. The album uses a variety of heavily edited samples from instruments and other releases. According to Hecker, Harmony in Ultraviolet is a continuation of his older works, as it keeps the heaviness of his previous album, Mirages, while being more melodic than his earlier releases.

"Rainbow Blood"
"Rainbow Blood" contains a "screeching and trebly" drone and a processed guitar.

The album has fifteen tracks. The opener "Rainbow Blood" contains a "screeching and trebly" drone and a processed guitar. The following track, "Stags, Aircraft, Kings and Secretaries", also uses a processed guitar. This transitions into "Palimpsest I", described as a mediation between tracks. "Chimeras" has slow and looping tones alongside synths with arpeggio. The title references the Chimera, a creature in Greek mythology. Following "Dungeoneering" and "Palimpsest II", the track "Spring Heeled Jack Flies Tonight" was described as violent and having a slow pacing by critics. The title is a reference to the Spring-heeled Jack, a character in English folklore. It is followed by a four-track suite named "Harmony in Blue", which evolves from a warmer tone to a significantly darker sound. After it, "Radio Spiricom" includes heavy use of keyboards and static, with synths near the end. The title is named after the spiricom, a 1980s electronic audio device which was claimed to be able to talk to spirits. A two-track suite named "Whitecaps of White Noise" follows, which uses distortion and static throughout, and fades into a drone with degraded keyboards. The first part of the suite uses a sample of an organ, arranged with staccato. The album ends with "Blood Rainbow", a companion piece to "Rainbow Blood", which some critics said made Harmony in Ultraviolet a "loop".

== Reception ==
Professional ratings
Review scores
Source	Rating
AllMusic	4/5 stars
Pitchfork	8.7/10
PopMatters	8/10
Remix	4/5 stars
Sputnikmusic	5/5
Tiny Mix Tapes	4/5 marks

Harmony in Ultraviolet received positive reviews from publications like Pitchfork, PopMatters, and Tiny Mix Tapes. Some journalists regarded it as one of his best. Nate Dorr for PopMatters considered it as Hecker's finest work, as it creates appeal from "jarring" noise. A writer for Sputnikmusic gave it a perfect score out of five, and described it as a "bit of a drug trip reverie".

Writers commented and praised on the structure and sound of it. Pitchfork writer Mark Richardson said "Harmony in Ultraviolet is sensual body music of a very particular kind, and it's the sort of record that asks a lot. But if you trust it and go along, it knows exactly where to lay its hands." Writer Marisa Brown for AllMusic described the album's tracks as "work[ing] together to form an idea that's greater than its individual elements: a sense of exploration and sadness and understanding of the infiniteness and uncertainty and expanse of the world". Saul Austerlitz for The Boston Globe described the album as "more than the sum of its parts" and likened it to Canadian band Godspeed You! Black Emperor. Remix writer Christine Hsieh said that the album was one of "those rare albums that creeps unnoticed into the listener's headspace".

Critics also compared Harmony in Ultraviolet to other albums. Dusted's Emerson Dameron compared it to Hecker's earlier works, to say that Harmony in Ultraviolet's artwork and structure "suggest a heavy, shenanigan-free affair", while his older works were described as more lonesome and sad. P. Funk writing for Tiny Mix Tapes noted that the album had similar tones to Hecker's Radio Amor, and that one of the strengths of it was its structure. Funk also commented on how sounds change into each other, describing it as strange. Michael Henning for independent magazine Treblezine compared the album to Brian Eno's On Land, in which Harmony in Ultraviolet was equally "organic", although more "digital".

The album was featured in multiple listicles. Pitchfork called Harmony in Ultraviolet the ninth best ambient album of all time and the fourteenth best album of 2006. Mark Richardson on the ambient list explained: "It makes you feel small, one speck on a pale blue dot. Harmony is the rare ambient album that begs to be played loud." In another list from the publication, where each writer lists their favourite albums from 2006, the album would be listed ten times. Writers for Treblezine put Harmony in Ultraviolet in its list of "10 Essential Ambient Albums" and its list of the twenty best Kranky albums. After the release of Love Streams (2016), Hecker's eighth album, Lindsey Rhoades from Stereogum ranked Harmony in Ultraviolet as the second best album in his discography.

== Track listing ==
All tracks are written by Tim Hecker.

Harmony in Ultraviolet track listing
No.	Title	Length
1.	"Rainbow Blood"	1:52
2.	"Stags, Aircraft, Kings and Secretaries"	4:31
3.	"Palimpsest I"	0:35
4.	"Chimeras"	3:13
5.	"Dungeoneering"	5:24
6.	"Palimpsest II"	0:38
7.	"Spring Heeled Jack Flies Tonight"	3:11
8.	"Harmony in Blue I"	1:31
9.	"Harmony in Blue II"	1:52
10.	"Harmony in Blue III"	2:41
11.	"Harmony in Blue IV"	2:02
12.	"Radio Spiricom"	4:52
13.	"Whitecaps of White Noise I"	7:29
14.	"Whitecaps of White Noise II"	5:57
15.	"Blood Rainbow"	4:06
Total length:		49:54

== Personnel ==
Credits adapted from liner notes.

- Denis Blackham – mastering
- Jonathan Parent – organ stab (on tracks 13–14)
