= Red Studio =

Red Studio may refer to:

- The Red Studio or L'Atelier Rouge, a painting by Henri Matisse from 1911
- Red 5 Studios, a computer game
- RED STUDIO, a game project of CD Projekt Red
- Red Studios Hollywood, a motion picture studio
