= Monument to Fallen Partisans =

World War 2 Memorial in Bologna, Italy

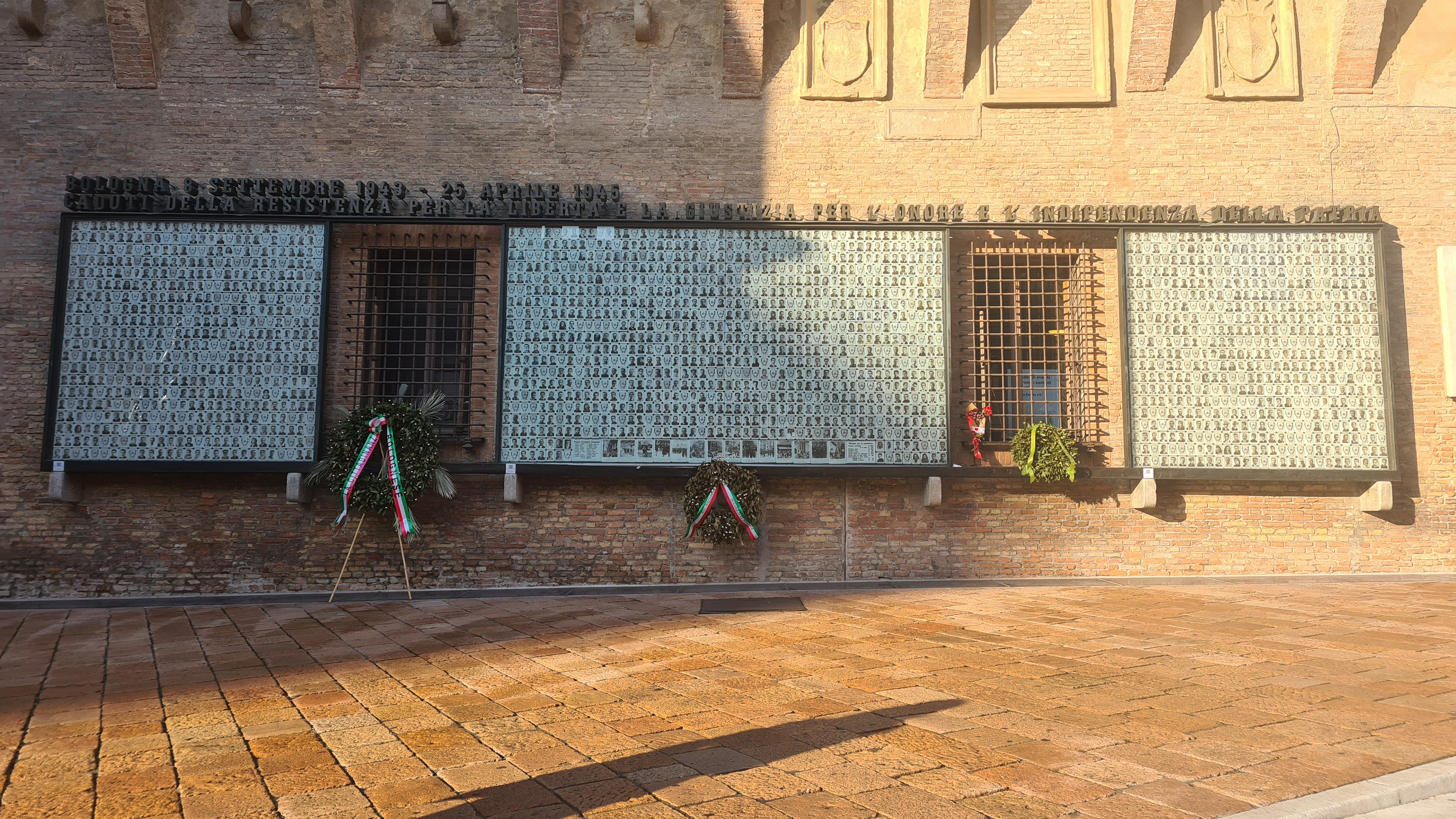
The monument in 2021

The Monument to Fallen Partisans (Italian: Sacrario dei Partigiani) is a commemorative installation located in Bologna. The monument is composed primarily of a collection of photos of fallen Italian partisans. Images were initially placed there spontaneously by relatives of those pictured in April 1945, shortly before the conclusion of World War II in Italy. 10 years later, the site completed its transformation into a permanent memorial.

== History ==
The memorial began to take shape on 21 April 1945, when the city was liberated from Axis occupation. Groups of women spontaneously began to post photos of their loved ones on a wall of the town hall, in the same spot where many partisans had been shot. The Fascists themselves ironically referred to this spot as the partisans' refreshment point, referring to the soup kitchen set up by Francesco Zanardi inside the Biblioteca Salaborsa. There, the bodies of those executed were left on display as a warning to citizens.

This is how the first nucleus of the Shrine was formed, often referred to as the Altar of the People (aba or Altar of the Martyrs. During the 1940s, there was much debate about its preservation, given that it was exposed to the elements and, above all, following a fire on 23 April 1947 that destroyed about two-thirds of the reliquary.

A committee was therefore established with the aim of erecting a permanent memorial, which was joined by individual citizens and local personalities, associations including the ANPI, but also banks, the municipality and the province. The final design, by architect Giuseppe Vaccaro, was inaugurated on the tenth anniversary of liberation by Mayor Giuseppe Dozza, and subsequently by then-President of Italy Giuseppe Saragat on 25 April 1955.

On the night between 13 and 14 February 1973, it was the target of a fascist attack, which was responded to with a demonstration on 17 February. On 5 June 2009, it was also defaced with fascist graffiti which made reference to Propaganda Due as well as its leader Licio Gelli.

== Description ==
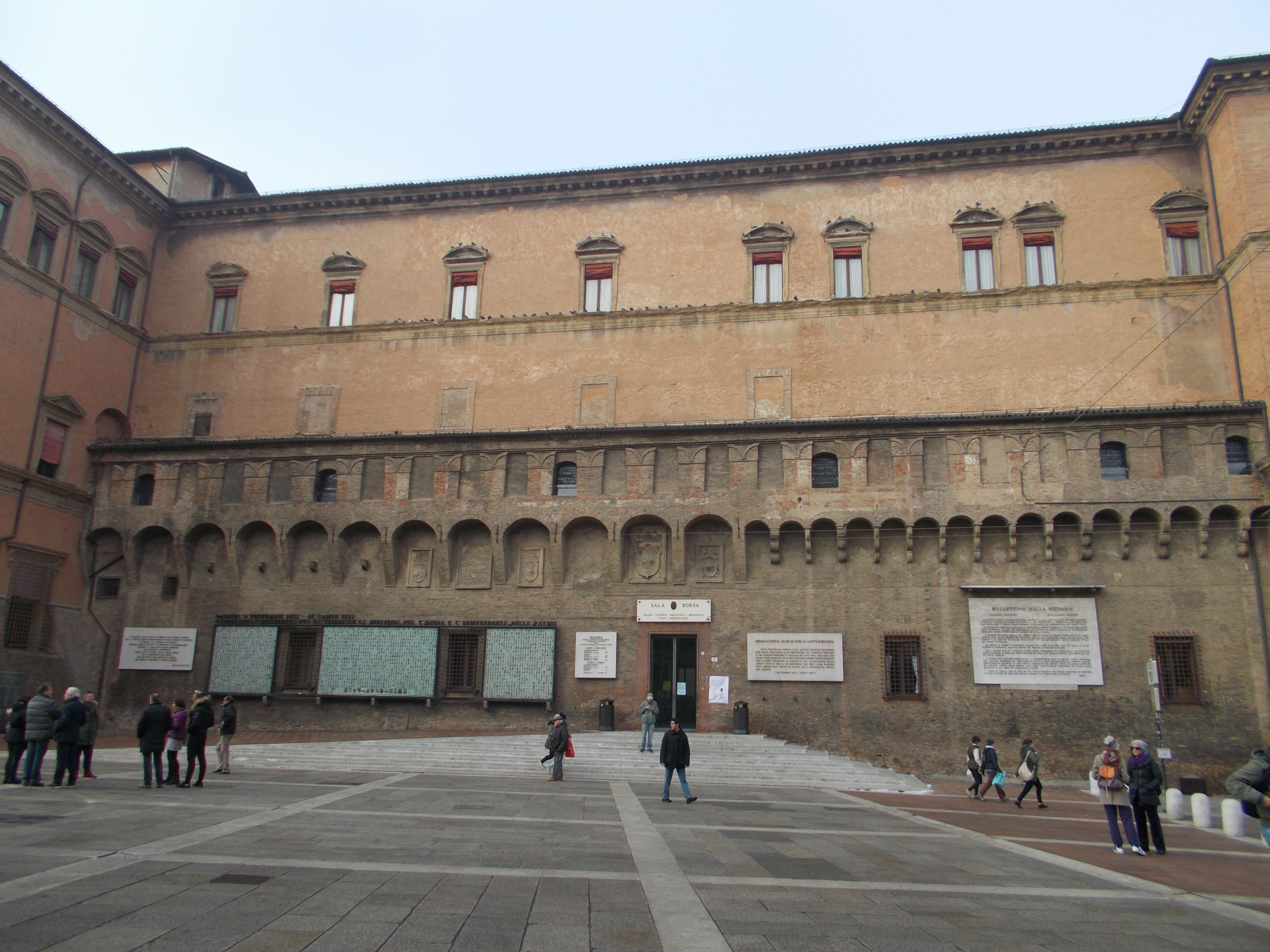
Facade of the Salaborsa, with the memorial located in the lower left.

The memorial commemorates the fallen partisans of the Resistance War in Bologna and its province. It is located on the wall of Palazzo d'Accursio overlooking Piazza del Nettuno, adjacent to the Biblioteca Salaborsa.

The memorial is composed of three large frames containing more than 2,000 glass-ceramic tiles. Each of them bears the name of a fallen partisan, often accompanied by a photograph. In the central frame, the largest, some tiles commemorate the partisan formations active in the province, and some numerical data: the partisans, divided into men and women, the dead, the arrested, the deported and the decorated. In the centre appear those who received the Gold Medal of Military Valour. The three frames are interspersed with the windows of the building and connected by a bronze inscription above:

Bologna 8 settembre 1943 - 25 aprile 1945 Caduti della Resistenza per la libertà e la giustizia, per l’onore e l’indipendenza della Patria

Translated into English, this reads:

Bologna 8 September 1943 - 25 April 1945 Fallen of the Resistance for freedom and justice, for the honour and independence of the Fatherland

== In the arts ==
The Shrine was seen by the American soldier Edward Reep during the days of liberation, who was so impressed that he photographed and drew it. In 1946 he painted it in the form of a painting entitled Italian Shrine, now exhibited at the Smithsonian American Art Museum.

The artist Christian Boltanski was inspired by the Shrine for his work Les Regards, exhibited for the first time at Villa delle Rose and then at MAMbo.

The memorial is also featured on the cover of Tim Hecker's 2006 album Harmony in Ultraviolet.

== See also ==
- Monumento Ossario ai caduti partigiani
- Monumento di Monte Sabbiuno
