= Grafts (album) =

Studio album by Kara-Lis Coverdale
- Released: 26 April 2017
- Length: 22:31
- Label: Boomkat Editions

Kara-Lis Coverdale chronology
Aftertouches (2015)	Grafts (2017)	From Where You Came (2025)

Grafts is a solo studio album by Canadian composer, musician, and arranger Kara-Lis Coverdale. It was released on 26 April 2017 through Boomkat Editions.

== Background ==
Kara-Lis Coverdale is a Canadian composer, musician, and arranger. She was born in Ontario and attended music school at the University of Western Ontario. In 2010, she moved to Montreal. She released A 480 (2014) and Aftertouches (2015). Grafts was released on 26 April 2017 through Boomkat Editions. It consists of one composition separated into three parts: '2c', 'Flutter', and 'Moments in Love'.

Grafts was reissued in an expanded edition on 15 July 2020 through Boomkat Editions. It includes a 20-minute piece, "Undo", on the B-side. In addition to a digital release, the expanded reissue edition was made available on gold-colored vinyl, with a new artwork and program notes written by Coverdale, limited to 700 copies.

== Critical reception ==
Professional ratings
Review scores
Source	Rating
Pitchfork	7.7/10
Resident Advisor	4.2/5
Tiny Mix Tapes	4/5 stars

Andrew Ryce of Resident Advisor commented that "Coverdale's interests in classical and experimental electronic approaches have tended to exist in separate spheres." He added, "On Grafts, she brings them together beautifully." Thea Ballard of Pitchfork stated, "With Grafts, Coverdale seems to propose a decidedly agnostic vision of what devotional electronics could mean in our contemporary moment, folding a natural awareness of technology's forms into music that feels insistently about being present."

=== Accolades ===
Year-end lists for Grafts
Publication	List	Rank	Ref.
Crack	The Top 100 Albums of 2017	74	
Noisey	The 100 Best Albums of 2017	91	
Resident Advisor	2017's Best Tracks	—	
Tiny Mix Tapes	2017: Favorite 50 Music Releases	40	

Decade-end lists for Grafts
Publication	List	Rank	Ref.
Tiny Mix Tapes	2010s: Favorite 100 Music Releases of the Decade	99	

== Track listing ==
All tracks are written by Kara-Lis Coverdale.

Grafts track listing
No.	Title	Length
1.	"Grafts" ('2c' / 'Flutter' / 'Moments in Love')	22:31

2020 reissue edition bonus track
No.	Title	Length
2.	"Undo"	20:10

== Personnel ==
Credits adapted from liner notes.

- Kara-Lis Coverdale – performance, recording, mixing, art direction
- Matt Colton – mastering
- Boomkat – artwork
