= Shards (EP) =

2025 EP by Tim Hecker

EP by Tim Hecker
- Released: February 21, 2025
- Genres: Ambient; experimental
- Length: 31:07
- Label: Kranky

Tim Hecker chronology
No Highs (2023)	Shards (2025)

Singles from Shards
- 1. "Sunset Key Melt" Released: January 16, 2025

Shards is an EP (Note: Some sources say it is an album.) by Canadian electronic music musician Tim Hecker. It was released in February 21, 2025 through Kranky. The EP received positive reviews from critics.

== Release and composition ==
Shards was released in February 21, 2025 through Kranky. In promotion for Shards, Hecker released "Sunset Key Melt" as a single on January 16. Alongside it, a visualizer was made for the track, depicting a jet-ski. The EP is composed of scrapped tracks that Hecker made for Infinity Pool, The North Water, Luzifer, and Lockdown Tower. Although, the soundtracks for Infinity Pool and The North Water were released before.

The EP has been described as ambient and experimental.

== Reception ==
Professional ratings
Aggregate scores
Source	Rating
Metacritic	73/100
Review scores
Source	Rating
AllMusic	3.5/5 stars
MusicOMH	4/5 stars
Pitchfork	7.1/10
PopMatters	8/10
Uncut	6/10

Shards received positive reviews from critics. At Metacritic, a review aggregator, the EP has a score of 73 out of 100 from 5 reviews, meaning generally favorable reviews.

Paul Simpson writing for AllMusic said that Shards was "representative of his signature sound, encapsulating the emotional depth and innovative sonic". Writing for MusicOMH, Sam Shepherd said that the EP was more "cohesive" and "let the listener to create their own interpretations and visualisations". Pitchfork writer Christopher R. Weingarten said that the EP was Hecker's most diverse work and that it was "an unfixed landscape that moves from shadowy to frigid to transcendent with ease". Comparing Shards to Hecker's Harmony in Ultraviolet (2006) and Virgins (2013), J. Simpson of PopMatters said that Shards was "subtler, more delicate meditation on the world and our place in it". Jon Dale for Uncut said that the EP showed Hecker's ability in soundtracks, and that it was "weirdly disembodied".

== Track listing ==
Shards track listing
No.	Title	Length
1.	"Heaven Will Come"	4:48
2.	"Morning (Piano Version)"	4:22
3.	"Monotone 3"	4:18
4.	"Ice Synth"	2:45
5.	"Sars Requiem"	3:13
6.	"Joyride Alternate"	4:05
7.	"Sunset Key Melt"	7:36
Total length:		31:07
