= No Highs =

Studio album by Tim Hecker
- Released: April 7, 2023
- Genre: Ambient
- Length: 51:18
- Label: Kranky

Tim Hecker chronology
Anoyo (2019)	No Highs (2023)	Shards (2025)

No Highs is the eleventh studio album by Canadian ambient musician Tim Hecker, released on April 7, 2023, via Kranky.

== Background ==
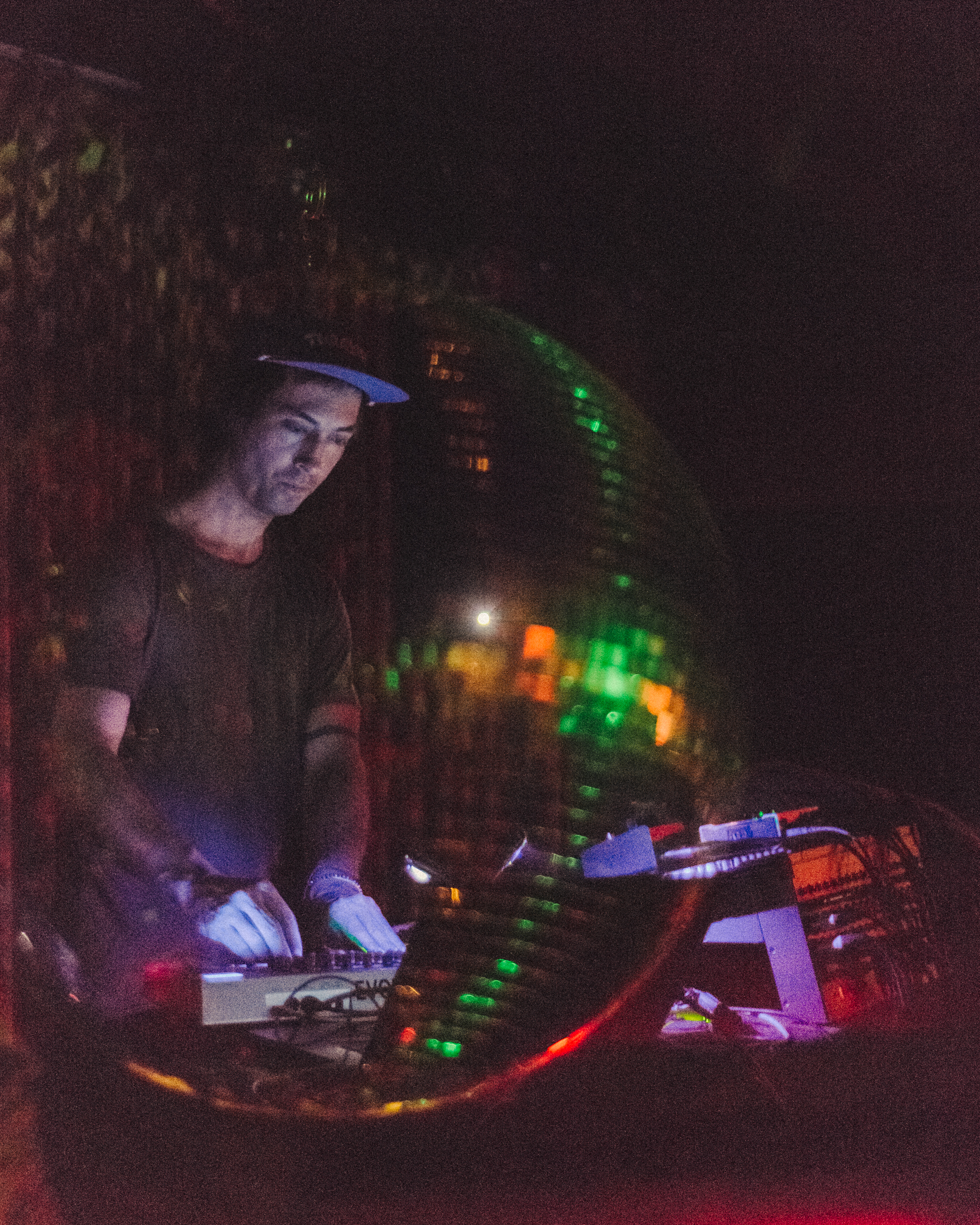
Hecker in 2018

A press release about the album discussed ambient music's place in the modern era. It reads: "[the album] serves as a beacon of unease against the deluge of false positive corporate ambient currently in vogue". The album is Hecker's reaction to this "soothing", corporate ambient, as shown in the album's anxious and fretful sound. The album was also seen as a response to the rise of ambient music on streaming services, which, according to The Guardian, "[threatens to] reduce ambient to a genre of convenience". Pitchfork wrote that "ambient music is in crisis" due to the abundance of channels on streaming services which "guarantee hours of chilled-out, challenge-free audio".

== Composition ==
No Highs is an ambient album. The album is a departure of the sound of Hecker's last two albums, and was described by Pitchfork as "less confrontational". According to AllMusic, No Highs is about "dealing with depression, anxiety, and isolation" which reflects in the nervous tone of the music. The Skinny wrote that the album attempts to portray the contemporaneous era, and its sounds evoke "dead horizons and husk cityscapes". According to Sputnikmusic, the album is "profoundly lonely-feeling".

The eight-minute opener "Monotony" begins with a Morse code-like post-minimalist pulse, before "sweeping" synths and a church organ are added. According to Pitchfork, this organ is a signature sound of Hecker. "Total Garbage" includes playing by saxophonist Colin Stetson. "Lotus Light" helps portray the album's anxious mood through "a loud, high-pitched beeping noise". "In Your Mind" uses a sequencer pattern which has a fluctuating tempo. Stetson also plays on "Monotony II". Pitchfork compared the final two tracks, "Sense Suppression" and "Living Spa Water", to early ambient music. The satirically titled "Living Spa Water" was described by AllMusic as conveying "somewhere between a replenishing bath and an out-of-body experience".

== Critical reception ==
Professional ratings
Aggregate scores
Source	Rating
Metacritic	77/100
Review scores
Source	Rating
AllMusic	3.5/5 stars
The Guardian	4/5 stars
Pitchfork	7.2/10
The Skinny	3/5 stars
Slant Magazine	3.5/5 stars
Sputnikmusic	4.0/5

No Highs received positive reviews from critics. According to the review aggregator Metacritic, No Highs received "generally favorable reviews" based on a weighted average score of 77 out of 100 from 11 critic scores.

Paul Attard of Slant Magazine praised the album's atmosphere and dynamic sounds, but found some tracks like "Winter Cop" and "Sense Suppression" underwhelming in comparison to the rest of the album. Kompys2000 of Sputnikmusic described the album's sounds as "frequently gorgeous and sometimes even transcendent", but the album can seem standoffish in comparison to Hecker's other works.

Joe Creely of The Skinny criticized the album's lack of focus and said it didn't stand out compared to previous work. Creely praised some "moments of tremendous beauty", including parts of the tracks "Monotony II" and "Total Garbage". Daniel Bromfield of Pitchfork found the album "muted" and unwilling to take risks in comparison to his earlier albums, such as Harmony in Ultraviolet or Ravedeath, 1972.

== Track listing ==
1. "Monotony" – 8:22
2. "Glissalia" – 2:58
3. "Total Garbage" – 2:40
4. "Lotus Light" – 8:31
5. "Winter Cop" – 2:35
6. "In Your Mind" – 3:35
7. "Monotony II" (feat. Colin Stetson) – 2:57
8. "Pulse Depression" – 2:27
9. "Anxiety" – 8:16
10. "Sense Suppression" – 2:04
11. "Living Spa Water" – 6:46
