= Love Streams =

Love Streams may refer to:

- Love Streams (film), a 1984 film directed by John Cassavetes
- Love Streams (album), a 2016 album by Tim Hecker
