= Fríkirkjan í Reykjavík =

Church in Reykjavík, Iceland

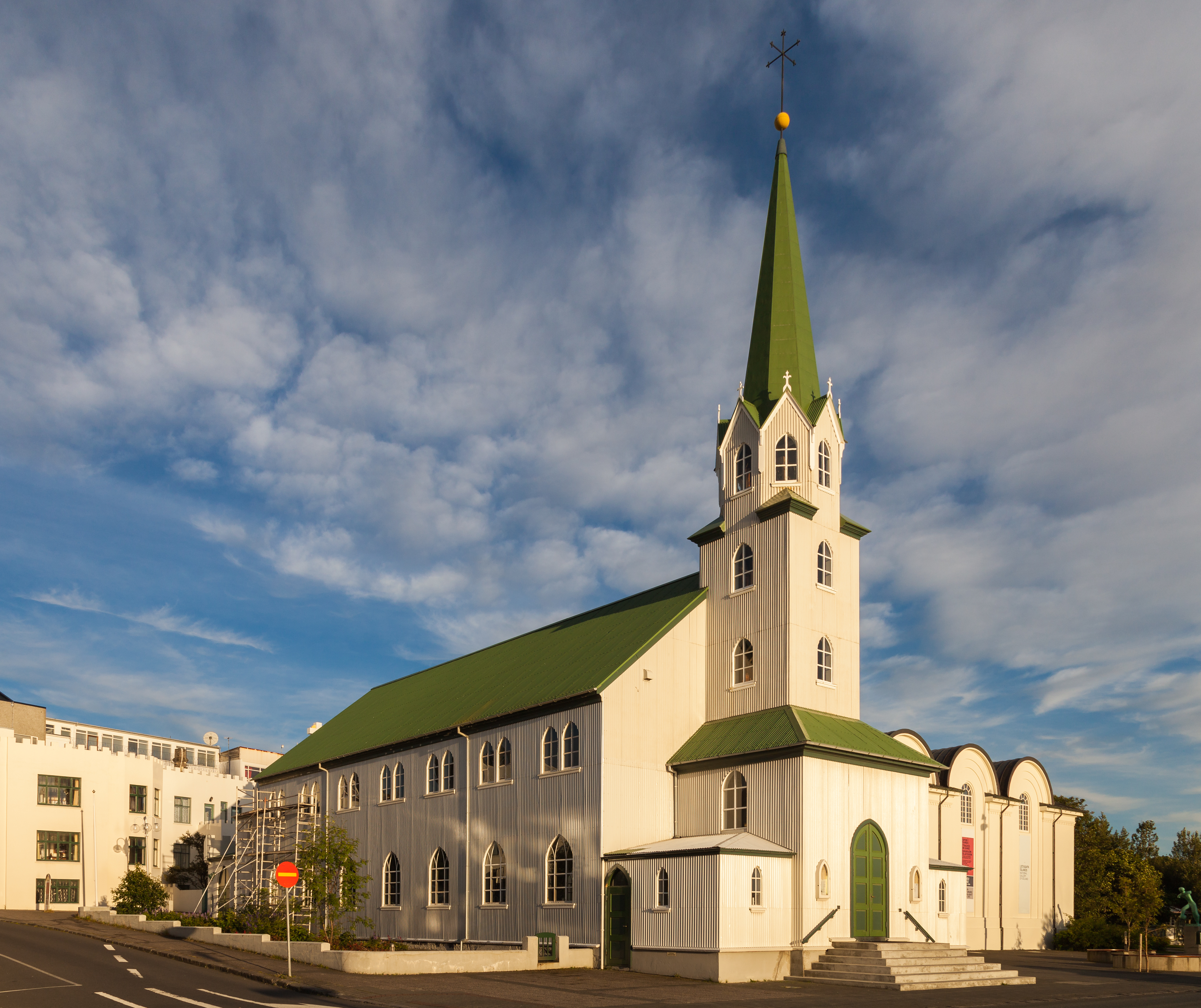
- Free Church in Reykjavík
- Fríkirkjan í Reykjavík
- 64°8′39.54″N 21°56′21.23″W
- Location: Reykjavík, Iceland
- Denomination: Lutheran (Free Church)

History
- Status: Active

Architecture
- Architect: Rögnvaldur Ólafsson

Specifications
- Materials: Concrete (chancel), wood

The Fríkirkjan í Reykjavík (English: The Free Church in Reykjavik) is a Lutheran church independent from the Church of Iceland, the established church of Iceland. It lies in the centre of the Icelandic capital, by the lake Tjörnin.

The Fríkirkjan í Reykjavík congregation was established in Reykjavík in the autumn of 1899. It had an initial membership of 600 which soon rose. The foundation of the Free Church did not spring from any doctrinal dispute with the national Lutheran church, but arose from objections to certain aspects of the national church's organisations. The Free church followed the example of churches in Norway and those of Icelandic immigrant communities in North America, in wishing to bring the church closer to the people. The rising population of Reykjavík and the concomitant social changes also contributed. Craftsmen and tradesman were growing classes in the town, and new districts were built, and yet Reykjavík Cathedral was still the only church.

Shortly after the new congregation was founded, a suitable site for a new church was chosen at the east of the lake. The church was consecrated on 22 February 1903. Only two years later the church was lengthened, to a design by architect Rögnvaldur Ólafsson. In 1924 the church was enlarged again. A chancel was built of concrete at the eastern end, and various alterations were built on either side of the forechurch, supervised by master builder Guðmundur H. Þorláksson.

The pipe organ for Tim Hecker's album Ravedeath, 1972 was recorded at Fríkirkjan in July 2010.

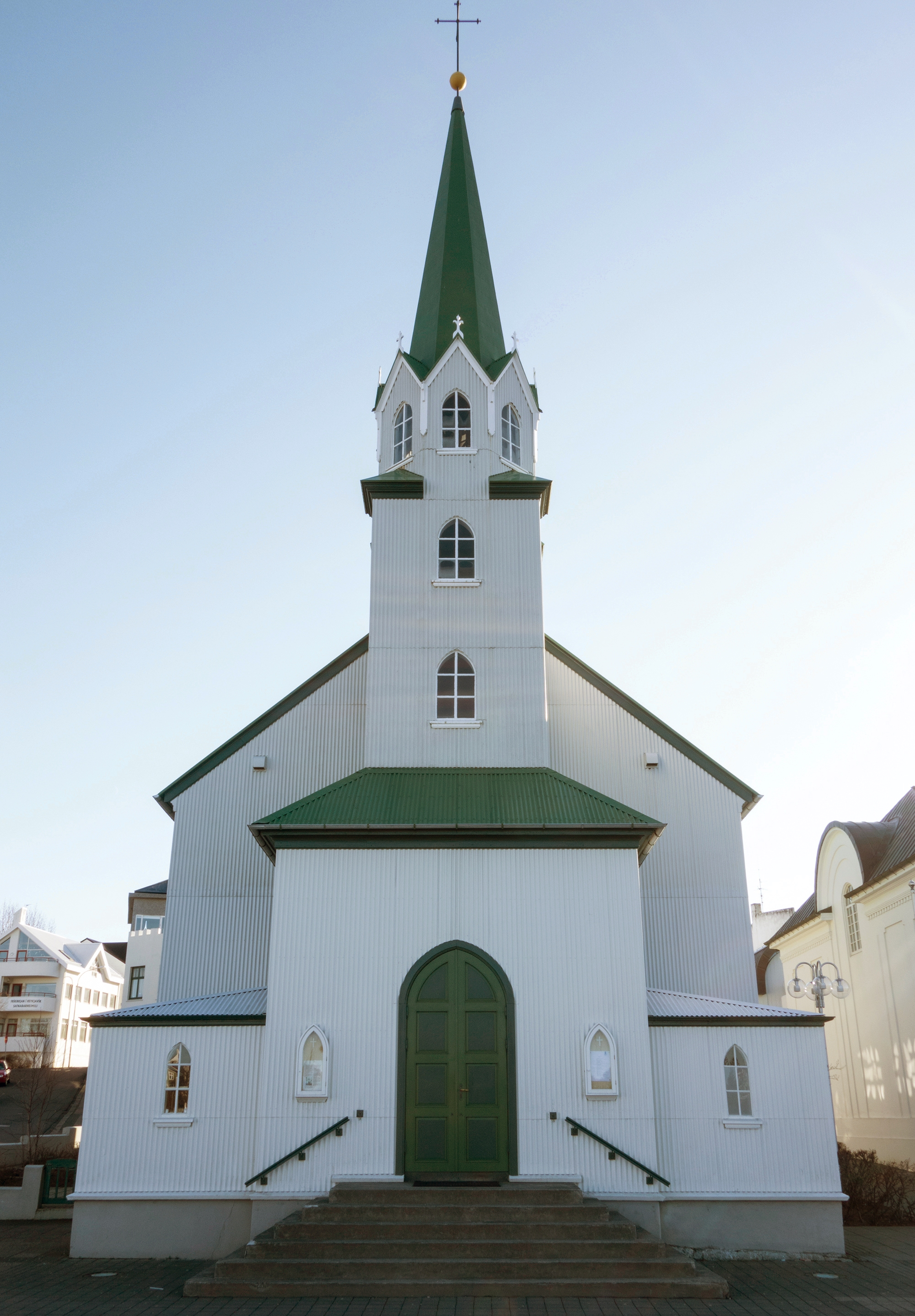
Fríkirkjan í Reykjavík (Free Church Reykjavik)
