= Cristian Gastou =

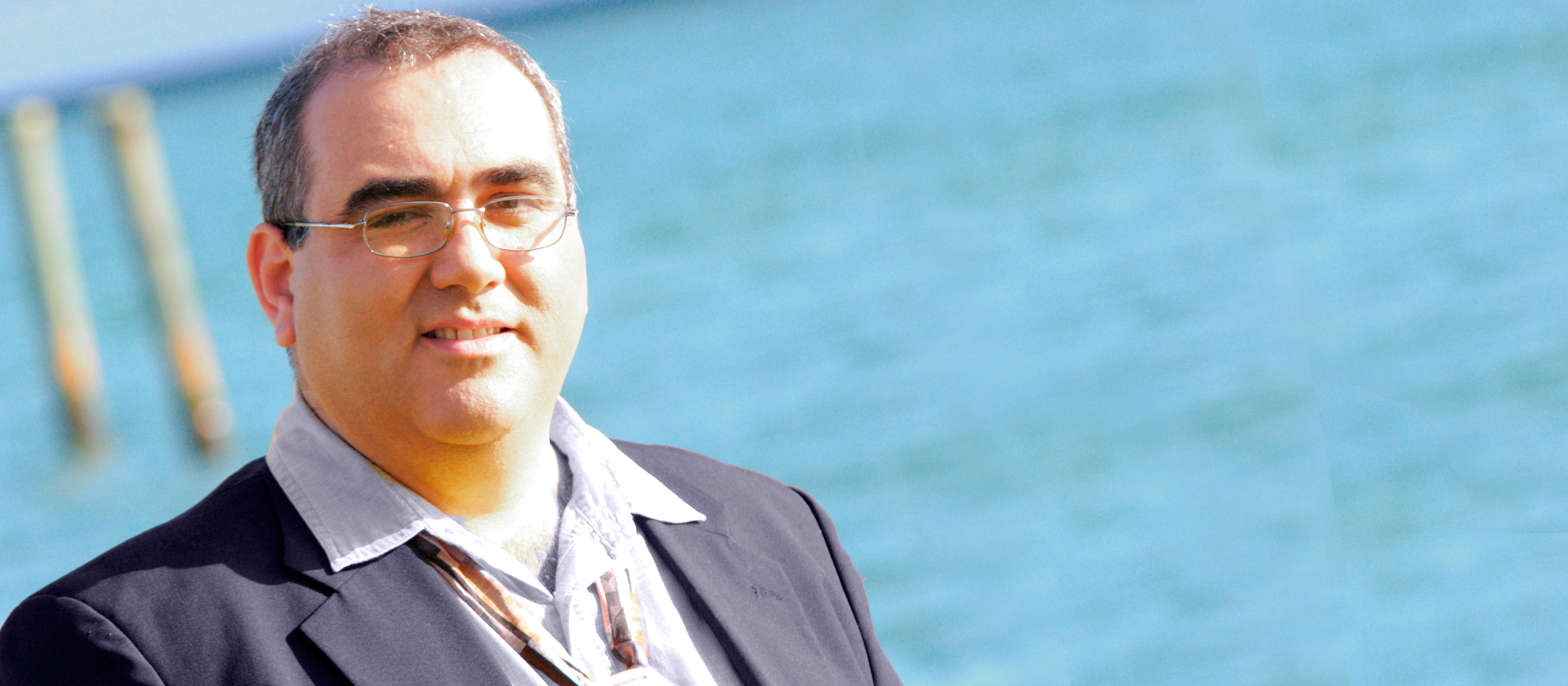
Cristian Gastou. Miami, Fl. (2009)

Cristian Gastou. Songwriter, producer and evangelical preacher, born in Cordoba, Argentina on August 30, 1970. He lives in Atlanta, Georgia.

He has participated in events, concerts, conferences and evangelist events along with speakers and performers such as Yiye Avila, Carlos Annacondia Dante Gebel, Alex Campos, Funky, Contagious, Daniel Calvetti and many more.

He has released two albums as a singer/songwriter: Comprobado (2007) (Proved) and Como se escapan los Lunes (2010). (As the Monday escape) The album Como se escapan los Lunes includes the song Mirándome (Looking to me), with the participation of salsa musician Richie Ray, winner of several awards including the Latin Grammy for lifetime achievement. Cristian has been highlighted in the Hispanic market of Christian music as a producer and composer, as well as singer.

The songs, Volverás (You'll come back), Si faltas tú (If you're not), Tu me amas (You love me) and Mirándome (Looking at me), have spearheaded the tops of the major Christian radio stations in Latin America, as: La nueva 88.3 fm Miami, Radio Amor 91.9 fm. Baton Rouge, Louisiana, Plenitud Stereo 96.6 Barranquilla Colombia, among others. Cristian Gastou, work at The LittleOne Christian Studio in Atlanta, Georgia.

In the month of January 2013, Cristian Gastou with his wife Karina, founded the Christian Development Church, (Iglesia Desarrollo Cristiano) located in the city of Lawrenceville Georgia.

== Awards ==
He won three ARPA Awards (awarded by ANMAC - National Academy of Music and Christian Arts of Mexico) for his work as a producer:

- 2007 - Best Children Album - Dios no es un viejito (God is not an old man) / Shanna (Producer)
- 2008 - Best Child album - Se buscan corazones (Wanted hearts) / Laura Ayala (producer, composer)
- 2009 - Best independent album - El ultimo tren (Last Train Out) / Daniela Barroso (producer, composer)
- 2007 - nominee as: Composer of the Year for the song Volverás (You'll come back)
- 2010 - nominee as: best album of singer/songwriter, by Como se escapan los Lunes (As the Monday escape)

He won the PAOLI Award 2007 (Orlando, FL) as Christian singer/songwriter revelation of the year.
