= Konoyo =

Studio album by Tim Hecker
- Released: September 28, 2018
- Studio: Various: Studio Atlio; Jiunzan Mandala-Temple Kanzouin, Tokyo; Sunblind Studios
- Genre: Electronic; ambient; dark ambient; drone; gagaku; sound collage
- Length: 59:06
- Label: Kranky
- Producer: Tim Hecker

Tim Hecker chronology
Love Streams (2016)	Konoyo (2018)	Anoyo (2019)

Singles from Konoyo
- 1. "This Life" Released: July 31, 2018; 2. "Keyed Out" Released: September 12, 2018

Konoyo is the ninth studio album by Canadian electronic music musician Tim Hecker, released on September 28, 2018 on Kranky and Sunblind Music. A majority of the album was made from Hecker's visits to Japan, where he worked with a gagaku ensemble, Tokyo Gakuso, in Jiunzan Mandala-Temple Kanzouin on the outskirts of Tokyo.

== Critical reception ==
Professional ratings
Aggregate scores
Source	Rating
AnyDecentMusic?	7.7/10
Metacritic	81/100
Review scores
Source	Rating
AllMusic	4/5 stars
Drowned in Sound	8/10
Exclaim!	9/10
The Guardian	4/5 stars
Mojo	3/5 stars
Pitchfork	8.5/10
PopMatters	9/10
Resident Advisor	4.2/5
Rolling Stone	3.5/5 stars
Uncut	7/10

According to the review aggregator Metacritic, Konoyo received "universal acclaim" based on a weighted average score of 81 out of 100 from eighteen critic scores. The review aggregator AnyDecentMusic? gave Konoyo a weighted average score of 7.7 out of 10 from nineteen critic scores.

=== Accolades ===
Publication	Accolade	Rank	Ref.
Crack Magazine	Top 50 Albums of 2018	26	
Gaffa	Top 30 Albums of 2018	13	
The 405	Top 50 Albums of 2018	6	
PopMatters	Top 70 Albums of 2018	28	
PopMatters	Top 20 Avant-Garde and Experimental Albums of 2018	4	
Sputnikmusic	Top 50 Albums of 2018	7	
Tiny Mix Tapes	Top 50 Albums of 2018	21	

== Track listing ==
All tracks are written by Tim Hecker.

No.	Title	Length
1.	"This Life"	8:42
2.	"In Death Valley"	5:36
3.	"Is a Rose Petal of the Dying Crimson Light"	3:27
4.	"Keyed Out"	9:46
5.	"In Mother Earth Phase"	10:26
6.	"A Sodium Codec Haze"	5:46
7.	"Across to Anoyo"	15:26
Total length:		59:06

Notes

- All tracks are stylized in sentence case, except for "In Death Valley" and "Across to Anoyo". For example, "This Life" is stylized as "This life".

== Personnel ==
- Mariel Roberts – cello
- Tim Hecker – computer, electric guitar, synth, writer, producer
- Kara-Lis Coverdale – keyboards
- Yoshiyuki Izaki – percussion (uchimono)
- Takuya Koketsu – woodwind (ryuteki)
- Motonori Miura – woodwind (hichiriki)
- Fumiya Otonashi – shō
- Jake Viator – transfer
- Akihiro Iizuka – engineer
- Ben Frost – engineer
- Toshihiko Kasai – engineer
- Teo Schifferli – design, layout
- Tobias Spichtig – artwork, photography

== Charts ==
Chart (2018)	Peak position
UK Dance Albums (OCC)	18
