= Dropped Pianos =

2011 EP by Tim Hecker

EP by Tim Hecker
- Released: October 10, 2011
- Recorded: 2010
- Studio: Hotel2Tango; Studio Pentagram
- Genre: Ambient; experimental
- Length: 32:35
- Label: Kranky

Tim Hecker chronology
Ravedeath, 1972 (2011)	Dropped Pianos (2011)	Instrumental Tourist (2012)

Singles from Dropped Pianos
- 1. "Sketch 5" Released: September 26, 2011

Dropped Pianos is an EP by Canadian electronic music musician Tim Hecker. It was released on October 10, 2011 on Kranky, and was a collection of demo recordings for Ravedeath, 1972, the album he released earlier that year. The EP received positive reviews from critics.

== Recording and release ==
Dropped Pianos was recorded in early 2010 at recording studios Hotel2Tango and Studio Pentagram. It released on October 10, 2011 through Kranky. It was available as vinyl, a CD, and as a digital download. The EP was a companion for Ravedeath, 1972, the album which Hecker released earlier on the year of the EP's release. Before the EP, "Sketch 5" was released on September 26 as a single on SoundCloud.

== Composition and titling ==
The EP is composed of demo recordings made in preparation for Ravedeath, 1972. It was solely made with a piano and a delay pedal. The release has been described as ambient and experimental.

The tracks on the EP are titled with "Sketch" and a number following it. According to a writer for Tiny Mix Tapes, the title of Dropped Pianos is in reference on how the pianos on the EP were changed to church organs on Ravedeath, 1972.

== Reception ==
Professional ratings
Review scores
Source	Rating
Beats Per Minute	78%
Pitchfork	7.8/10
Sputnikmusic	4/5
Tiny Mix Tapes	3.5/5 stars

Dropped Pianos received positive reviews from critics. Writing for Beats Per Minute, Colin Joyce said that the tracks were "fully formed and ready to be consumed on their own merit" for a demo. Marc Masters for Pitchfork said that the EP was darker in tone than Ravedeath, 1972, and that it "[showed] how small ideas can lead to greater ones". A writer for Sputnikmusic said that it was a "shockingly solid work that separates itself from [Ravedeath, 1972]", while also lacking consistency. James Parker of Tiny Mix Tapes said that it was "minimal", but "deserves not to be reduced to 'mere' ambience".

== Track listing ==
Dropped Pianos track listing
No.	Title	Length
1.	"Sketch 1"	7:09
2.	"Sketch 2"	3:57
3.	"Sketch 3"	1:20
4.	"Sketch 4"	2:56
5.	"Sketch 5"	4:58
6.	"Sketch 6"	1:24
7.	"Sketch 7"	3:26
8.	"Sketch 8"	1:43
9.	"Sketch 9"	5:32
Total length:		32:25

== Personnel ==
Credits adapted from liner notes.

- Radwan Moumneh – recording assistant
- Steve Bates – recording assistant
- Mell Dettmer – masterer
- David Nakamoto – artwork
