= My Love Is Rotten to the Core =

Studio album by Tim Hecker
- Released: June 25, 2002
- Recorded: December 2001
- Genre: Ambient; glitch
- Length: 24:46
- Label: Alien8; Substractif

Tim Hecker chronology
Haunt Me, Haunt Me Do It Again (2001)	My Love Is Rotten to the Core (2002)	Radio Amor (2003)

Professional ratings
Review scores
Source	Rating
AllMusic	3.5/5 stars
Eye Weekly (Toronto)	3/4 stars
Pitchfork	6.8/10
Stylus	B

My Love Is Rotten to the Core is Tim Hecker's third release. It was released on June 25, 2002 by Substractif, a sub-label of Alien8 Recordings. The record is a concept album of sorts, being composed of spliced and sampled elements of Van Halen songs and interviews, constructed into a mini-narrative of the band's dissolution and breakup, accompanied by Hecker's compositions of ambience and noise.

The title is taken from a line off Van Halen's major hit "Ain't Talkin' 'Bout Love".

== Track listing ==
All tracks are written by Tim Hecker.

No.	Title	Length
1.	"Introducing Carl Cocks"	8:31
2.	"Sammy Loves Eddie Hates David"	2:50
3.	"Hello Detroit"	7:24
4.	"Midnight Whispers"	0:50
5.	"The Return of Sam Snead"	5:02
Total length:		24:46
