= From Where You Came =

Studio album by Kara-Lis Coverdale
- Released: May 9, 2025
- Studio: The Shop (Valens); Pumpkin House (St. George); GRM (Paris); EMS Elektronmusikstudion (Stockholm)
- Length: 42:35
- Label: Smalltown Supersound
- Producer: Kara-Lis Coverdale

Kara-Lis Coverdale chronology
Grafts (2017)	From Where You Came (2025)

From Where You Came is the eighth studio album by Canadian composer Kara-Lis Coverdale. It was released on May 9, 2025, by Smalltown Supersound. Released eight years after Coverdale's previous studio album, From Where You Came consists of eleven songs with a total runtime of approximately forty-two minutes.

== Reception ==
Professional ratings
Review scores
Source	Rating
AllMusic	4/5 stars
Pitchfork	6.8/10
The Skinny	4/5 stars
Uncut	8/10 stars

AllMusic's Paul Simpson described the album as "a mature, beautiful work expressing wonder and hope." Patrick Gamble of The Skinny referred to it as "a beautiful collection of ambient compositions that explore the interconnectedness of all things," rating the album four stars. Stephen Deusner of Uncut gave it an eight-out-of-ten rating and noted, "Coverdale deploys gentle synth cascades and live-instrument drones to evoke a sense of the celestial, as though everything is floating just a few feet off the ground." Henry Ivry of Resident Advisor gave the album a "RA Recommends" rating stating, "The sheer range of Coverdale's palette makes for a spectacular listen. This is the closest she's sounded to capturing the energy of her live performances–during shows, it can sometimes feel like each song teeters on the edge of entropy as layers of sound stack atop one another." For Pitchfork, Sam Goldner rated the album 6.8 out of ten and stated, "At its best, From Where You Came makes for some high-grade sleep music—which is both pleasant and a little disappointing, coming from an artist as distinctive as Coverdale." The Guardian awarded the album "Experimental Album of The Month," described by Safi Bugel as "quietly ecstatic," a world that is "focused and full of feeling." Lucy Thraves of The Wire states it "feels appropriate for spring, as Coverdale's precise ear for instrumental textures and organic development of motifs yields fragile emergent ecosystems...largely wordless odysseys wrought from rich, detailed instrumentation, are peppered with arresting moments where some internal shift, like a change of mind, pushes the song in new directions."

== Track listing ==
All music is composed by Kara-Lis Coverdale.

From Where You Came track listing
No.	Title	Length
1.	"Eternity"	3:31
2.	"Flickers in the Air of Night"	4:02
3.	"The Placid Illusion"	5:49
4.	"Daze"	5:16
5.	"Coming Around"	1:51
6.	"Problem of No Name"	4:05
7.	"Freedom"	6:58
8.	"Offload Flip"	2:14
9.	"Habitat"	2:11
10.	"Equal Exchange"	2:03
11.	"The Ceremonial Entrance of Colour"	4:35
Total length:		42:35

== Personnel ==
Credits adapted from Bandcamp.

- Kara-Lis Coverdale – recording, editing, mixing, production
- Regina Greene – executive production
- Anne Bourne – cello on "Eternity", "Flickers in the Air of Night", and "Coming Around"
- Kalia Vandever – trombone on "The Ceremonial Entrance of Colour"
- Jay Hodgson – mastering
- Adam Feingold – cover photo
- Kaja Krakowian – art, sleeve design
