= Mirages (Tim Hecker album) =

Studio album by Tim Hecker
- Released: September 21, 2004
- Recorded: November 2002 and March 2004 in Montréal and Ottawa
- Genre: Ambient; glitch
- Length: 47:41
- Label: Alien8

Tim Hecker chronology
Radio Amor (2003)	Mirages (2004)	Harmony in Ultraviolet (2006)

Professional ratings
Review scores
Source	Rating
AllMusic	link
AlmostCool.org	link
Pitchfork	7.9/10
Stylus	(B−) 10/5/2004

Mirages is the third studio album by Canadian electronic music musician Tim Hecker, released on September 21, 2004 on Alien8 Recordings. It is described on the Alien8 website as "an ambient-death-metal classic in waiting." The album is composed primarily of heavily distorted and processed guitar.

The track "The Truth of Accountants" is a reference to the philosophy of director Werner Herzog. In 1999, Herzog made a declaration at the Walker Art Center in Minneapolis, writing, "By dint of declaration the so-called Cinema Verité is devoid of verité. It reaches a merely superficial truth, the truth of accountants.". Herzog continues to use this phrase to distance himself from the idea that facts create truth.

== Track listing ==
All tracks are written by Tim Hecker.

No.	Title	Length
1.	"Acéphale"	4:57
2.	"Neither More Nor Less"	3:10
3.	"Aerial Silver"	3:37
4.	"Celestina"	4:31
5.	"Counter Attack"	2:13
6.	"The Truth of Accountants"	2:21
7.	"Aerial Light-Pollution Orange"	3:09
8.	"Non Mollare"	1:10
9.	"Kaito"	3:08
10.	"Balkanize-You"	8:37
11.	"Incurably Optimistic!"	10:40
Total length:		47:41

== Production notes ==
- Recorded in Montreal and Ottawa from November 2002 – March 2004
- Le Fly Pan Am + Christof Migone play on track 3
- Oren Ambarchi plays guitar on track 9
- David Bryant plays guitar on track 11
- "Kaito" samples the recording of the number station "Magnetic Fields" off the Conet project, which contains a recording by Jean Michel Jarre
