= Anoyo =

Studio album by Tim Hecker
- Released: May 10, 2019
- Length: 34:26
- Label: Kranky
- Producer: Tim Hecker

Tim Hecker chronology
Konoyo (2018)	Anoyo (2019)	No Highs (2023)

Anoyo is the tenth studio album by Canadian musician Tim Hecker. It was released on May 10, 2019, under Kranky.

== Background ==
The album was recorded in the Jiunzan Mandala-Temple Kanzouin in Tokyo, at the same time as Hecker's 2018 album Konoyo.

== Critical reception ==
Professional ratings
Aggregate scores
Source	Rating
AnyDecentMusic?	7.4/10
Metacritic	79/100
Review scores
Source	Rating
AllMusic	3.5/5 stars
Exclaim!	8/10
The Line of Best Fit	8.5/10
MusicOMH	3.5/5 stars
Pitchfork	7.8/10
Resident Advisor	3.8/5 stars
The Skinny	4/5 stars

Anoyo was met with generally favorable reviews from critics. At Metacritic, which assigns a weighted average rating out of 100 to reviews from mainstream publications, this release received an average score of 79, based on 13 reviews.

=== Accolades ===
Publication	Accolade	Rank	Ref.
Drift Records	Top 100 Albums of 2019	56	
Obscure Sound	Top 50 Albums of 2019	45	
XLR8R	Best Albums of 2019	N/A	

== Track listing ==
All tracks are written by Tim Hecker.

Anoyo track listing
No.	Title	Length
1.	"That world"	9:10
2.	"Is but a simulated blur"	4:10
3.	"Step away from Konoyo"	4:38
4.	"Into the void"	4:48
5.	"Not alone"	3:10
6.	"You never were"	8:30
Total length:		34:26

Notes

- All tracks are stylized in sentence case, excluding the word "Konoyo". For example, "That World" is stylized as "That world".

== Personnel ==
Credits adapted from liner notes.

- Tim Hecker – computer, synthesizer, production
- Motonori Miura – hichiriki
- Fumiya Otonashi – shō
- Takuya Koketsu – ryūteki
- Yoshiyuki Izaki – uchimono
- Toshihiko Kasai – engineering
- Akihiro Iizuka – engineering assistance
- Ben Frost – additional engineering
- Ayako Sanjo – translation, co-ordination
- Jake Viator – detuning, tape transfer
- Matt Colton – mastering, cut
- Tobias Spichtig – artwork
- Teo Schifferli – layout, design
