= The Red Studio =

Painting by Henri Matisse

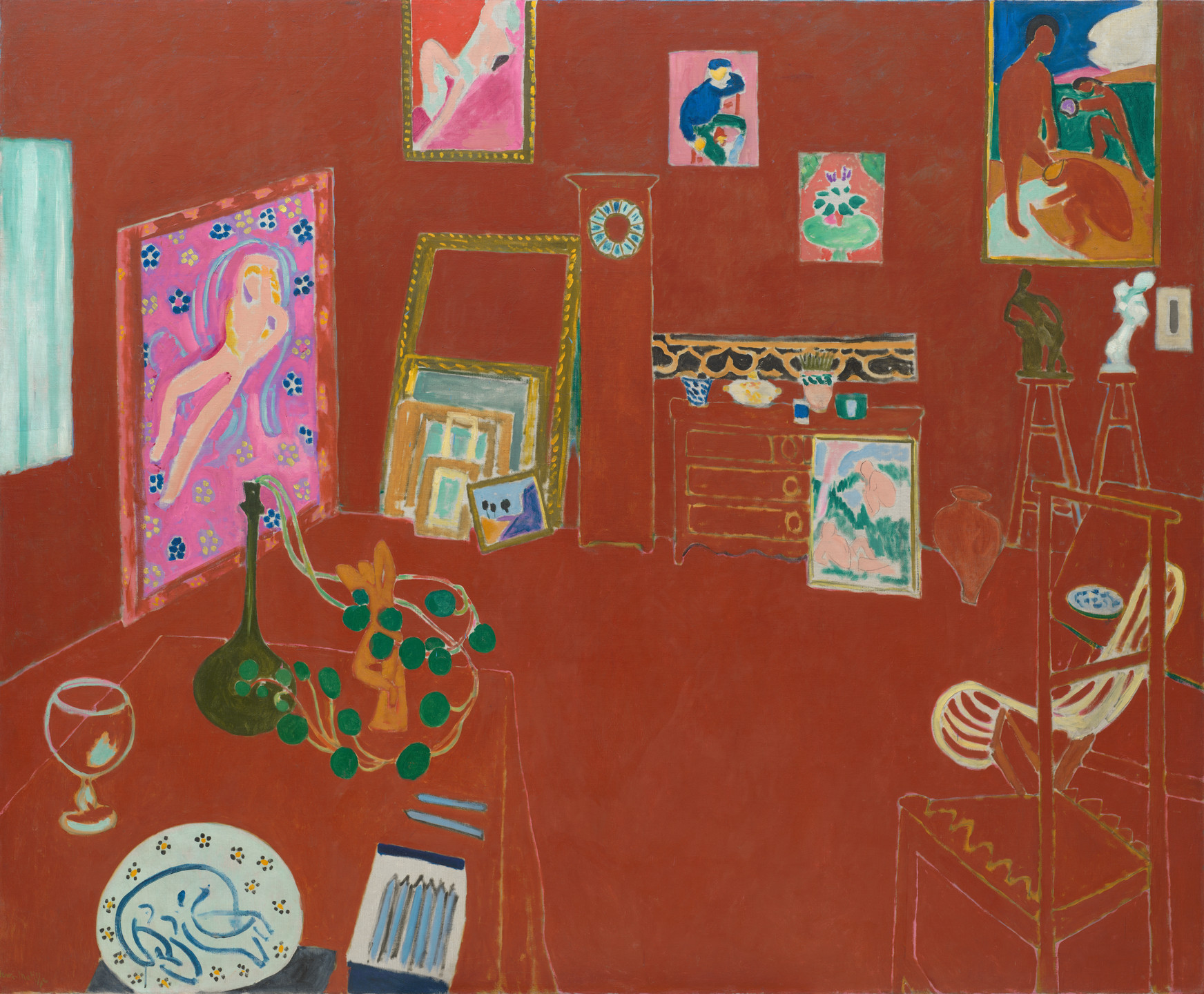
- Artist: Henri Matisse
- Year: 1911
- Medium: Oil on canvas
- Dimensions: 181 cm × 219.1 cm (71.25 in × 86.25 in)
- Location: Museum of Modern Art; New York

The Red Studio (French: L'Atelier Rouge) is an oil on canvas painting by French artist Henri Matisse from 1911. It is held in the collection of the Museum of Modern Art, in New York.

In 2004, L'Atelier Rouge came in at No. 5 in a poll of 500 art experts voting for the most influential of all works of modern art, along with works by Pablo Picasso, Marcel Duchamp and Andy Warhol.

== Formal analysis ==
This work depicts Matisse's atelier (studio) that he had built for himself in 1909, entirely awash in one tone of vibrant, rusty red. At 64 inches by 51 inches, the interior still life successfully accomplishes a monumentality while also seeming inviting. Unassertive yellow lines create the outlines of Matisse's furniture, creating objects out of the expansive red space. A grandfather clock sits approximately in the center of the composition, serving as a vertical axis that brings balance and harmony to the spatial discontinuities of the studio. The paintings and objects within the room, seemingly suspended in the sea of red, establish a sense of spatial depth by creating angles and perspective in an otherwise flat picture. They also give the eye a place to rest and bring a sense of harmony to the colors. Most of the objects are painted with whites, blues, and greens, colors that contrast and balance the thinly-applied red paint. There is also a tabletop that dominates the bottom left corner of the canvas, jutting out from the edge as if the viewer were next to it and looking down from a corner of the room. The spatial discontinuities of the table, the objects in the room, the chairs on the right side of the canvas, and the window on the left wall give the sense that this is the artist's environment, dominated by creativity and color more than laws of natural order.

== Influences ==
If one were to put L'Atelier Rouge in the chronology of Matisse's artistic production, it would land immediately after his Fauvist paintings. Created in 1911, the work is a singular, culminating expression of several key aspects of Matisse's artistic development up to that point. That is to say, the painting reflects the influence of Fauvism, Impressionism, Post-Impressionism, his early travels abroad, and his own emerging artistic code. For example, the red that dominates the canvas is evocative of his earlier work The Dessert: Harmony in Red (1908), yet it also illustrates compelling differences: exaggerated forced perspective, thinner washes of color, and a pared down composition. These differences are indicative of Matisse's growing concern with "a) the orchestration of pure colors and b) the search for a stable composition with the simplest means." For instance, the painting bears the influence of Impressionism in its lack of focal point, but it is clear that focal point was abandoned in favor of the compositional balance and harmony Matisse so desired. Similarly, the expressive use of color and forced perspective is comparable to Post-Impressionist Vincent van Gogh's The Night Café, yet once again it is clear how Matisse adapted these elements to his own aesthetic interests. In L'Atelier Rouge, the expressive use of color and lack of focal point work together to create harmony and balance. Even Fauvism, a style which Matisse himself developed with other artists in Paris, leaves its mark on the work in the use of bold color and disdain for realistic, representational painting.

Matisse also made several significant trips just prior to the creation of L'Atelier Rouge. He visited an Islamic exhibition in Munich; the Moorish cities of Seville, Córdoba, and Granada in Spain; and St. Petersburg and Moscow. One can see how this impacted the development of his aesthetic, as his tones and decorative motifs become more exotic–almost playful in his experimentation with forms and colors.

== Legacy ==
Matisse's technique in L'Atelier Rouge to use just one bold, rich color to create the entirety of the composition–by strategically using the absence of the red–would significantly impact the succeeding generations of Modern artists. This accomplishment is considered by some a direct precursor to color field painting, best exemplified by artists such as Mark Rothko and Kenneth Noland. For example, upon closer inspection, the pale "lines"—that carve the objects out of the red space and dictate the perspective of the room—are not lines at all. Rather, the lines themselves are constructed by the absence of the red paint. That is to say, Matisse originally painted the canvas a pale yellow. He then painted over that color with a thinly applied rusty, rich red, leaving thin bands of the under-color to serve as line. This same approach can be seen in works by Frank Stella, although he left bands of raw canvas. Similarly, the technique of layering color to establish depth or perspective—without formal use of line—serves as a crux for most of color field painting.

This painting was the subject of an exhibition at the Museum of Modern Art in New York (1 May–10 September 2022) and the National Gallery of Denmark in Copenhagen (13 October 2022–26 February 2023).

== See also ==
- List of works by Henri Matisse
