= Valens, Ontario =

- Dispersed rural community
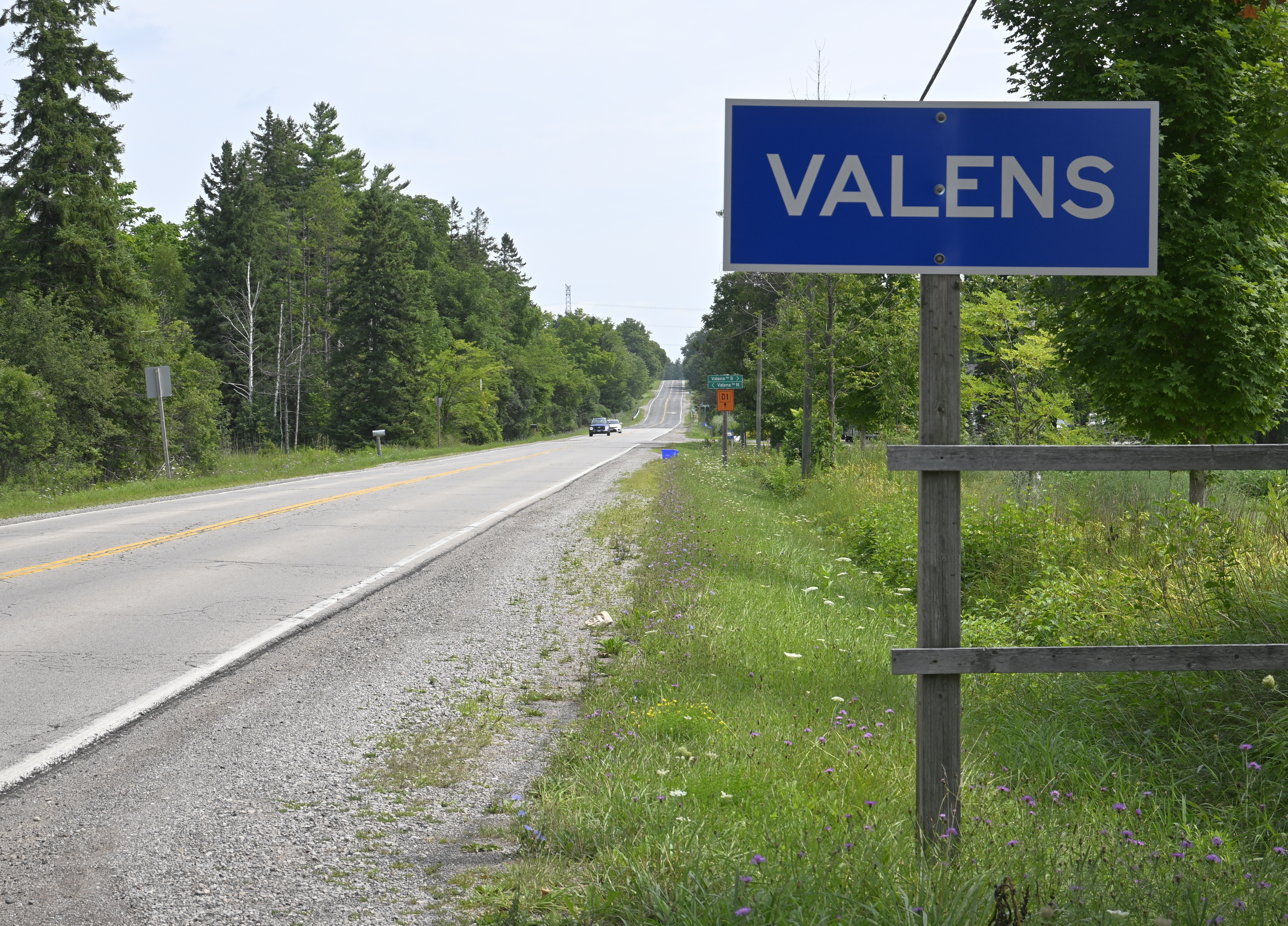
- Regional Road 97 in Valens

- Location within Southern Ontario Location within Canada
- Coordinates: 43°22′50″N 80°07′57″W
- Country: Canada
- Province: Ontario
- City: Hamilton
- Time zone: UTC-5 (Eastern (EST))
  - Summer (DST): UTC-4 (EDT)
- GNBC Code: FCZKM

Valens is a community in Hamilton, Ontario, Canada. It is the location of the Valens Conservation Area, which is built around the Valens Reservoir.

It is located about 36 km from downtown Hamilton. It can be reached by travelling north on highway 6 and then west on highway 97.

Valens Lake is a water reservoir managed by the Hamilton Conservation Authority and offers facilities for camping, hiking, swimming, boating and fishing. It used to be stocked with fish but now has a sustained natural fish population that has among others, carp, catfish, small and largemouth bass, pike, perch, an assorted varieties of pan fish, and the odd turtles.

A dam controls water flow from the basin. The water level may fluctuate throughout the year.
