= The Dessert: Harmony in Red (The Red Room) =

1908 painting by Henri Matisse

- Artist: Henri Matisse
- Year: 1908
- Medium: Oil on canvas
- Dimensions: 180 cm × 220 cm (70.9 in × 86.6 in)
- Location: Hermitage Museum, St. Petersburg

The Dessert: Harmony in Red (The Red Room) is a painting by Henri Matisse. Previously titled Harmony in Blue, the painting had a blue background when Matisse first exhibited it in 1908. In 1909, Matisse changed the blue to red, retitling it The Dessert: Harmony in Red (The Red Room).

== History ==
The background of the painting was originally green, but Matisse changed it to blue before exhibiting it at the Salon d'Automne in 1908. Sergey Shchukin purchased the work from the exhibition. In 1909, Matisse repainted the background in red, giving it the new title The Dessert: Harmony in Red. Matisse had the goal of capturing still life and the interiors of the time. Today, the painting is in the Hermitage Museum in Saint Petersburg, Russia.

== Description and analysis ==
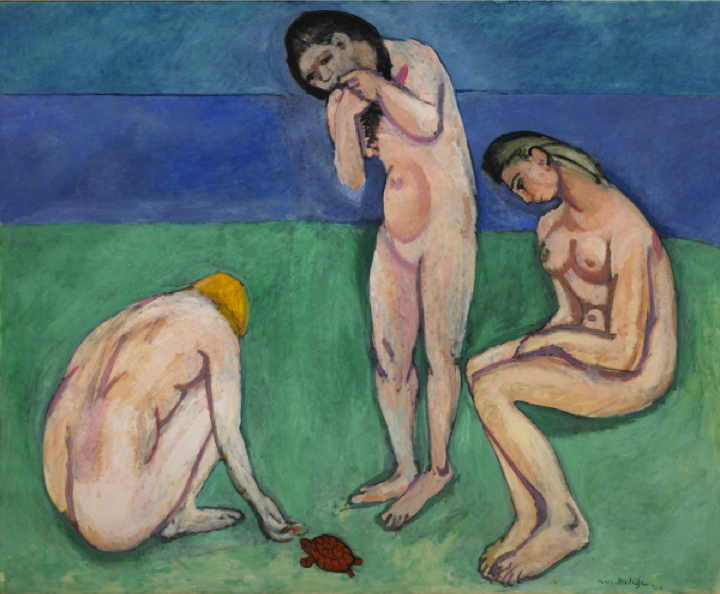
Bathers with a Turtle by Henri Matisse in 1907–1908

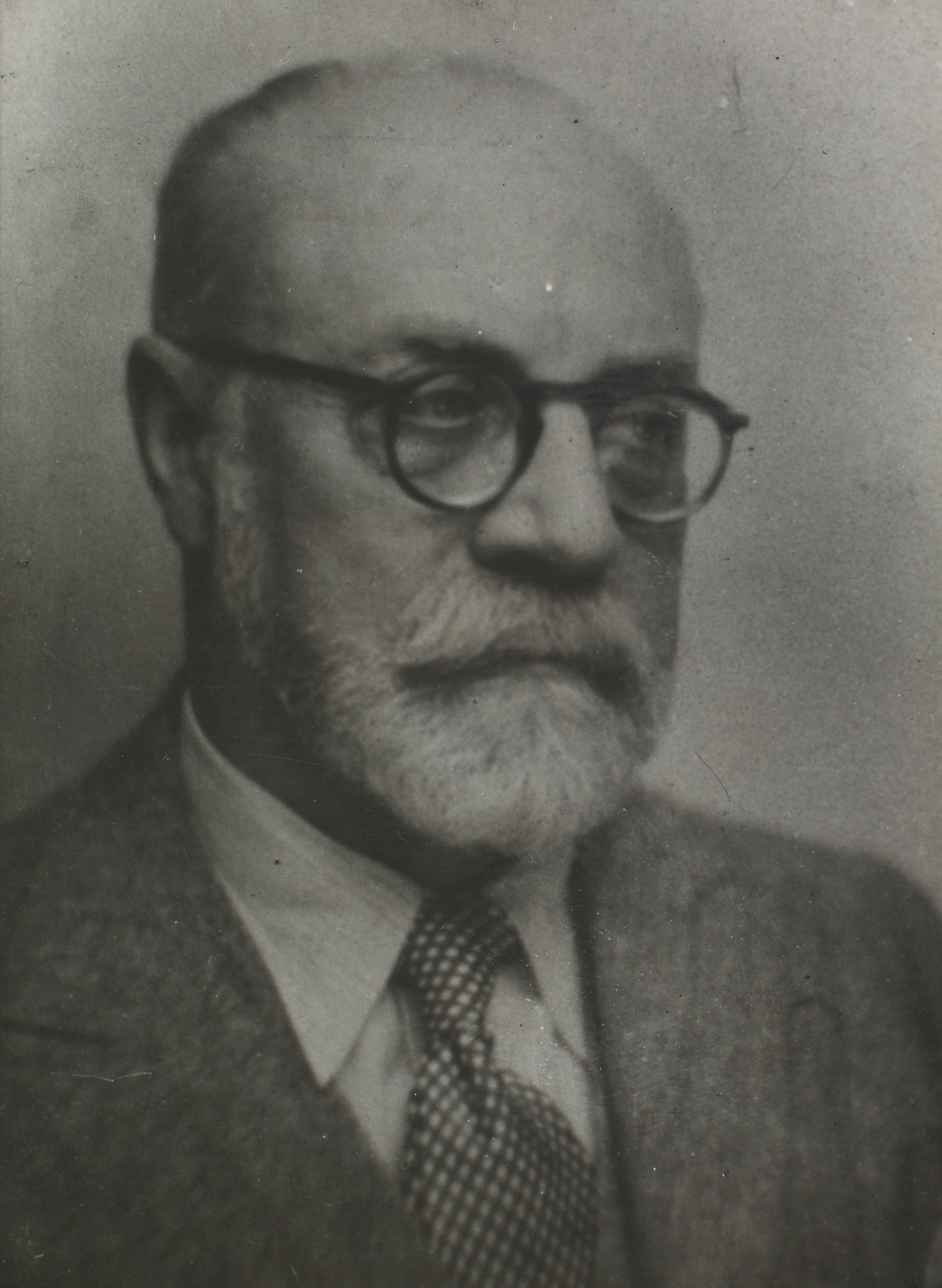
Henri Matisse

The painting reworks elements from Matisse's 1897 work The Desert. While that work was in an Impressionist style, the intense colors of the later painting are more consistent with Fauvism. The red of the room contrasts with the dark green of the landscape depicted outside the window. The dark blue swirls that line the tablecloth and walls contrast with the abundance of the rich red.

Matisse was intentional about maintaining the realistic qualities of objects even as he experimented with the colors of their surrounding environment. For example, the lemons on the table are yellow and maintain a realistic shape and size.

The woman in the painting provides a sense of reality in the painting. The woman is proportional to the table. The woman gives context to the time of the painting with the clothing she is wearing and the action she is completing. In the book Matisse: The Man and His Art, Katharine Kuh compares Harmony in Red with Matisse's painting Bathers with a Turtle, completed between 1907 and 1908. The curvature of the bodies in Bathers with a Turtle is similar to the pose of the woman in The Dessert: Harmony in Red.

The painting is unusual for the way it explores the relationship between flatness and deep space. The red of the tablecloth and walls are the same color, making the surface appear unified, but surrounding objects convey a sense of depth. For instance, the chair appearing behind the table gives context to the presence of a table. There is a faint line that runs between the table and the wall, providing a further hint of three-dimensional space.

The overwhelming and bold red color seen in The Dessert: Harmony in Red began a trend in Matisse's work. Pieces of work that followed created by Matisse included: The Red Studio and the Red Interior series.

== See also ==
- List of works by Henri Matisse
