= Kara-Lis Coverdale =

- Origin: Ontario, Canada
- Genres: Experimental; electronic; contemporary classical
- Occupations: Musician; composer; record producer
- Instruments: Electronics; piano; organ; Max MSP; synthesizer; sampler; computer
- Labels: Smalltown Supersound; Gate; Boomkat; Umor Rex; Sacred Phrases; Constellation Tatsu

Kara-Lis Coverdale, also known as K-LC, is a Canadian composer, musician, and producer based in Montreal, Quebec. Coverdale's music mixes electronic and traditional instruments, including piano, organ, and keyboard. She released A 480 (2014), Aftertouches (2015), Grafts (2017), From Where You Came (2025), A Series of Actions in a Sphere of Forever (2025), and Changes in Air (2025).

== Early life ==
Coverdale began studying music and piano at age 5. By age 14, she had begun performing and composing her own music. Her mother is an Estonian visual and choral artist, her father is a builder, and her great-uncle Ike Volkov is part of the Estonian folk group Kukerpillid. She was a competitive pianist until she went to music school at The University of Western Ontario, where she studied piano, composition, and musicology with Gwen Beamish, Omar Daniel, David Myska, and Jay Hodgson. She later studied in the MIT (Media Information Technologies) program. Canadian pianist Ann Southam presented her with the promising young artist award at The Contemporary Music Showcase in Toronto. At Western, Coverdale became captivated by the practice of electroacoustic music and began integrating electronics and digital processes into her work. The Kurzweil K2500 was the first sampler she ever worked with.

Since age 13, Coverdale has been the organist and music director at several churches across Canada. Sacred music is an influence in her composition work, as is Estonian choral and folk music.

== Music career ==
=== Tours and performances ===
Coverdale's live performances have been consistently met with widespread international critical acclaim. She has received outstanding reviews for her solo performances in publications like The New York Times, The Guardian, Wire, and Crack Magazine. In 2016 and 2017, Coverdale performed over eighty shows in Europe, North America, and Australia. She has opened tours for acts such as Big Thief and Caribou., is part of the Floating Points Promises Ensemble with Shabaka Hutchings, and the Konoyo Gagaku Ensemble.

Coverdale has performed at the Unsound Festival, Mutek, and Semibreve.

She has earned praise from Arvo Pärt (she also appears in the documentary "That Pärt Feeling" by Paul Hegeman) and Brian Eno. She is one of the only artists to open a solo show for Death Grips, in Köln at Stadtgarden in 2016. In 2017, Coverdale partook in the 17th edition of the Sonic Acts Festival in Amsterdam, exploring the theme of "The Noise of Being".

=== Montreal ===
Coverdale moved to Montreal in 2010 and took a new position as organist at St. John's Estonian Lutheran church in NDG. Coverdale collaborated live and in studio with electronic composer Tim Hecker, including on his 2013 album Virgins. She has also collaborated with the digital information artist LXV (David Sutton). In 2012, she self-released a series of solo piano pieces called Triptych. In 2013, she composed music for Wind Controller called "Conversion Music" which was premiered at LMCML by Montreal clarinetist Suzu Enns. A rework of that piece appears as X4EWI" on Coverdale's 2015 solo album Aftertouches, released by Sacred Phrases in March 2015. Coverdale is also a frequent collaborator with the writer Kara Crabb.

Adam Harper from The Fader described Aftertouches as a part of a new school of enterprising electronic artists that lean heavily into electronic adventuring, "as if to experiment with the very building blocks of musical beauty... to speak a language that not everyone speaks yet". Compared to its experimentalist contemporaries, Aftertouches approaches experimentalism with a more symphonic calculation and leaning towards composition, weaving both physical and technological realms to creates a series of celestial modern classical miniatures. The Wire describes Aftertouches as "...the textless, fleshless voice-keyboard, the lingering foggy sublime of CPU-washed tone granules, the modular serialism of object-oriented processes. The various parts are often starkly separated in colour and harmony, but the overall shape flows on smoothly either still learning from and resolving its experiences, or in thrall to an aesthetic that's beyond the horizon" (The Wire, issue 376, June 2015). For Adhoc, Neil Lord writes "The sweeping moments of beauty are balanced with stabs of electronic grit: an acrylic portrait of a Cronenberg-esque organism, morphing, half human, half machine." Aftertouches was named one of the best 25 records of the first half of 2015 by Adhoc, and was called "a true masterwork from a still young artist" by Bobby Power in Decoder.

== List of works ==
- "VoxU" (Montreal, Mutek 2017) - premiered at Mutek Montreal and was described by Exclaim to "set the precedent for aspiring experimental artists to come".
- "PICL" (Solo Piano, Creamcake, Berlin, 2017)
- "Marjamaa Laulud" (Opera, Dance, and Theatre company, Theatre Vanemuine, Tartu ES, 2017)
- "Shadow Encounter" (Pipe Organ, Berlin Jazz Festival, 2018)
- "Wood Has Memory" (Pipe Organ, Issue Project Room, 2018)
- "Grand Exorcism" (Electronics and Pipe Organ, Gesu, Montreal, RBMA, 2018)
- "Music for Skarven" (Sound Installation Oslo, 2019)
- "Aftertouches Acoustic" (Chamber Orchestra, Contemporaneous Ensemble, 2021)
- "Washington Baths" (Sound installation, Maine, 2023)
- "Light Music" (Violin and Electronics, Berlin, 2022)
- "Patterns in High Places" (Solo violin, Christopher Whitley, 2023)
- "Sol" (Choir, Ludens Choir, 2023).
- "Composite Matter" (Chamber Orchestra, Hamilton Philharmonic Orchestra, 2024)
- "Endocrine" (Cello Octet, Cello Octet Amsterdam, 2024)
- "A Series of Actions in a Sphere of Forever" (Solo Piano, Smalltown Supersound, 2025)
- "Three Body Illumination" (Pipe Organ, Braga 25, 2025)
- "Primary Action at a Distance" (Quantum Sound installation, Berlin Kraftwerk, 2025)

== Discography ==
=== Albums ===
- A 480 (Constellation Tatsu, 2014; reissue, Gate, 2020)
- Aftertouches (Sacred Phrases, 2015; reissue, Gate, 2020)
- Sirens (with LXV; Umor Rex, 2015)
- Grafts (Boomkat Editions, 2017; reissue, Boomkat Editions, 2020)
- From Where You Came (Smalltown Supersound, 2025)
- A Series of Actions in a Sphere of Forever (Smalltown Supersound, 2025)
- Changes in Air (Smalltown Supersound, 2025)

=== EPs ===
- Triptych for Solo Piano (Gate, 2012)

=== Singles ===
- "Fireflight" (Leiter, 2022)
- "Kvinne Med Gresskar" (Smalltown Supersound, 2025)

=== Original film and theatre scores ===
- Royal Jelly (by Kara Crabb; 2014)
- The Reproductive Life Cycle of a Flower (by Kara Crabb; 2015)
- Elektra (by Metahaven; 2019)
- Black Conflux (by Nicole Dorsey; 2019)
- Physician, Heal Thyself (by Asher Penn; 2023)
- Carpet Cowboys (by Emily MacKenzie and Noah Collier; 2023)
- To Use a Mountain (by Casey Carter; 2025)

=== Production credits / feature credits / reworks ===
- Tim Hecker – Virgins (keyboards and piano; Kranky, 2013)
- Tim Hecker – Massacred for Gold (keyboards for film score; directed by Jennifer Anderson and Vernon Lott, 2013)
- Lee Bannon – Patterns of Excel (keyboards, piano, and arrangements; Ninja Tune, 2015)
- How to Dress Well – Care (Weird World / Domino, 2016)
- Tim Hecker – Love Streams (4AD, 2016)
- Actress – Karma & Desire (Ninja Tune, 2020)
- Caterina Barbieri – Fantas Variations (Editions Mego, 2021)
- Lyra Pramuk – Delta (Bedroom Community, 2021)
