= Instrumental Tourist =

Studio album by Tim Hecker and Daniel Lopatin
- Released: November 20, 2012
- Recorded: Mexican Summer Studios
- Genres: Ambient; drone; experimental
- Length: 54:29
- Label: Software Recording Co.
- Producers: Tim Hecker, Daniel Lopatin

Tim Hecker chronology
Dropped Pianos (2011)	Instrumental Tourist (2012)	Virgins (2013)

Daniel Lopatin chronology
Music for Reliquary House (2011)	Instrumental Tourist (2012)	R Plus Seven (2013)

Instrumental Tourist is a collaborative studio album by Canadian musician Tim Hecker and American musician Daniel Lopatin (who records as Oneohtrix Point Never). The album was recorded over several improvisational jam sessions, and was released in November 2012 under Lopatin's Software Records imprint to generally positive critical reviews.

== Background ==
Lopatin and Hecker were admirers of each other's work but had no formal connection when Lopatin suggested a collaboration between the two in 2012. They met at Mexican Summer Studios, with recording sessions occurring over several days in the form of improvisational jam sessions which were later edited down. Lopatin cited producer Teo Macero's tape editing work with Miles Davis in the late-1960s/early-1970s as an inspiration for the sessions.

Lopatin stated that "I'm not sure how it emerged, but we pretty quickly got into this idea that we could paint an extended portrait of a sonic world that is filled with stock musical motifs and sounds," later saying that "we wanted to take those sounds, scrub away the cliché and see if they were salvageable." Hecker noted that "we didn't cut a path in advance. It sort of took shape very quickly in a non-contrived, almost unconscious level through joking around and talking in the studio."

== Reception ==
Professional ratings
Aggregate scores
Source	Rating
Metacritic	73/100
Review scores
Source	Rating
AllMusic	4/5 stars
DIY	6/10
Exclaim!	6/10
The Observer	4/5 stars
Resident Advisor	3.5/5
Spin	7/10
Tiny Mix Tapes	3.5/5 stars
Uncut Magazine	7/10
XLR8R	6.5/10

Instrumental Tourist received generally favorable reviews from critics, with an aggregate score of 73 out of 100 on Metacritic. AllMusic wrote that "Lopatin and Hecker take the sounds in their intentionally limited palette to places they may never have been expected to go, and the journey is intriguing and frequently lovely." The Observer wrote that "the strength of this record comes from their disregard for coherence and disinterest in finding common ground. Their warring improvisations are intriguing, unsettling and often exquisite." In a less positive review, XLR8R wrote that "despite scattered flashes of brilliance, too often it's an album that feels unambitious, as though it's content to dwell in the middle ground where the two producers' back catalogs intersect rather than forge something new." Uncut wrote that "as sublime as much of Instrumental Tourist is, it rarely fulfills that promise of improvisation, of a real sonic engagement or play, and struggles to exceed the sum of its parts."

== Track list ==
No.	Title	Length
1.	"Uptown Psychedelia"	5:58
2.	"Scene from a French Zoo"	4:59
3.	"Vaccination (For Thomas Mann)"	5:51
4.	"Instrusions"	4:52
5.	"Whole Earth Tascam"	5:00
6.	"GRM Blue I"	0:50
7.	"GRM Blue II"	5:48
8.	"Racist Drone"	5:39
9.	"Grey Geisha"	4:17
10.	"Instrumental Tourist"	3:19
11.	"Ritual for Consumption"	4:44
12.	"Vaccination No. 2"	3:12

== Personnel ==
- Tim Hecker – producer, mixing, amplifiers, Eventide Modal, synthesizer (Clavia Nord Modular), saxophone (Vapour), effects (Lexicon Unity, amplifier expansion)
- Daniel Lopatin – producer, synthesizer (Roland Juno 60, Alesis Ion), performer (Monks), lap steel guitar (Ur-Do Lapsteel), koto, electronics (Fm Wand)
- Al Carlson – engineer
- Rob Carmichael – graphic design
- Paul Corley – special assistance
- James Plotkin – mastering
