= An Imaginary Country =

Studio album by Tim Hecker
- Released: March 10, 2009
- Genre: Ambient; drone
- Length: 48:00
- Label: Kranky

Tim Hecker chronology
Harmony in Ultraviolet (2006)	An Imaginary Country (2009)	Ravedeath, 1972 (2011)

An Imaginary Country is the fifth studio album by Canadian electronic music musician Tim Hecker, released on March 10, 2009, by Kranky. The album is available on either CD or 2×LP.

== Reception ==
Professional ratings
Review scores
Source	Rating
AllMusic	4/5 stars
NME	3/5 stars
The Phoenix	3/4 stars
Pitchfork	7.7/10
PopMatters	8/10
Tiny Mix Tapes	3.5/5 stars

Initial critical response to An Imaginary Country was positive. At Metacritic, which assigns a normalized rating out of 100 to reviews from mainstream critics, the album has received an average score of 79, based on 11 reviews.

== Track listing ==
No.	Title	Length
1.	"100 Years Ago"	3:28
2.	"Sea of Pulses"	4:41
3.	"The Inner Shore"	4:17
4.	"Pond Life"	1:24
5.	"Borderlands"	4:46
6.	"A Stop at the Chord Cascades"	4:43
7.	"Utropics"	1:05
8.	"Paragon Point"	5:04
9.	"Her Black Horizon"	1:27
10.	"Currents of Electrostasy"	3:43
11.	"Where Shadows Make Shadows"	8:37
12.	"200 Years Ago"	4:45
Total length:		48:00
