= Virgins (album) =

Studio album by Tim Hecker
- Released: October 14, 2013
- Recorded: 2012
- Studios: Greenhouse (Reykjavík); Avast! (Seattle); EMPAC (Troy)
- Genres: Electronic; experimental; minimal music; drone
- Length: 48:46
- Labels: Kranky; Paper Bag

Tim Hecker chronology
Instrumental Tourist (2012)	Virgins (2013)	Love Streams (2016)

Singles from Virgins
- 1. "Virginal II" Released: August 27, 2013; 2. "Black Refraction" Released: September 26, 2013

Virgins is the seventh studio album by Canadian electronic musician Tim Hecker, released on October 14, 2013 by Kranky and Paper Bag Records.

== Background ==
Virgins was recorded during three periods in 2012, mostly in Reykjavik, Montreal and Seattle, using ensembles in live performance. A statement on Hecker's Bandcamp page elaborates:

The sound palette of this work is wider, almost 'percussive' and tighter sounding than previous works. While this album remains committed to a painterly form of musical abstraction, it is also a record of restrained composition recorded live primarily in intimate studio rooms. This record employs woodwinds, piano and synthesizers towards an effort at doing what digital music does not do naturally—making music that is out of time, out of tune and out of phase.

In an interview with Ted Davis, Hecker said, "I did a record, called Virgins, that was antagonistic to the idea of ambient. I was trying to make rhythmical, staccato, aggressive blasts that tried to not have it pigeonholed in that way, or kind of went beyond the confines of that category."

The image on the album cover is a reference to The Hooded Man, a photograph of Abdou Hussain Saad Faleh being tortured by members of the United States Army at Abu Ghraib Prison in 2003. Taken by Hecker in the Duomo di Milano, the photo depicts a statue of the Virgin Mary covered for restoration.

== Critical reception ==
Professional ratings
Aggregate scores
Source	Rating
AnyDecentMusic?	8.1/10
Metacritic	87/100
Review scores
Source	Rating
AllMusic	4/5 stars
The A.V. Club	A−
Mojo	4/5 stars
MusicOMH	4.5/5 stars
NME	8/10
Pitchfork	8.3/10
Q	4/5 stars
Resident Advisor	4.0/5
Spin	9/10
Uncut	8/10

Virgins received widespread critical acclaim upon its release. At Metacritic, which assigns a normalized rating out of 100 to reviews from mainstream critics, the album has received an average score of 87, based on 26 reviews, indicating "universal acclaim", and becoming Hecker's highest scoring album on the site.

Mike Powell of Pitchfork praised the album, stating, "This is music that benefits from being heard loud and/or on headphones in the same way couches are best experienced by actually sitting down in them instead of just brushing your fingers against the upholstery as you leave the room. Like a lot of Ben Frost’s albums (or something like Swans’ The Seer), Virgins feels possessed by the idea that no advancements in society or technology will ever shake our primal reactions to fear, wonder, awe and what in a more naïve era used to be called the sublime." Philip Sherburne of Spin gave the album a favorable review, stating, "Hecker's abstractions have never been more expressive than they are on Virgins".

Virgins was a longlisted nominee for the 2014 Polaris Music Prize. The album placed fifth in The Wire magazine's annual critics' poll.

== Track listing ==
All tracks are written by Tim Hecker.

No.	Title	Length
1.	"Prism"	2:53
2.	"Virginal I"	6:16
3.	"Radiance"	3:22
4.	"Live Room"	7:02
5.	"Live Room Out"	2:37
6.	"Virginal II"	5:23
7.	"Black Refraction"	3:33
8.	"Incense at Abu Ghraib"	1:53
9.	"Amps, Drugs, Harmonium"	3:03
10.	"Stigmata I"	2:18
11.	"Stigmata II"	3:56
12.	"Stab Variation"	6:30
Total length:		48:46

== Personnel ==
- Tim Hecker – mixing
- Ben Frost – performing, engineering
- Grímur Helgason – performing
- Kara-Lis Coverdale – performing
- Paul Matthew Moore – performing
- Valgeir Sigurðsson – performing, mixing
- Paul Corley – engineering
- Randall Dunn – engineering
- Mandy Parnell – mastering
- David Nakamoto – design, layout
