= Radio Amor =

2003 studio album by Tim Hecker

Studio album by Tim Hecker
- Released: March 25, 2003
- Recorded: 2001–2002 in Montreal and Halifax, Nova Scotia
- Genre: Ambient; glitch
- Length: 58:22
- Label: Mille Plateaux

Tim Hecker chronology
My Love Is Rotten to the Core (2002)	Radio Amor (2003)	Mirages (2004)

Radio Amor is the second studio album by Canadian electronic music musician Tim Hecker, released on March 25, 2003, through Mille Plateaux.

== Release and recording ==
Radio Amor was recorded from 2001 to 2002 in Montreal and Halifax, Nova Scotia. The album was inspired by Jimmy, a fisherman and shrimper that Hecker met during a visit to Honduras in the mid-1990s. In an article from The Wire, Hecker said that "I was totally obsessed with the idea of fishermen in the Caribbean".

The album was released on March 25, 2003, through Mille Plateaux, and re-released on January 23, 2007, through Alien8 Recordings. The album, along with Haunt Me, Haunt Me Do It Again were remastered by Matt Colton and re-released on July 6, 2018, via Kranky. The remaster was available through vinyl and CD.

== Reception ==
Professional ratings
Review scores
Source	Rating
AllMusic	4/5 stars
Pitchfork	8.3/10
Stylus Magazine	A−
Tiny Mix Tapes	4/5 marks

The album was received well by critics, with Pitchfork writer Mark Richardson describing it as "Hecker's coldest and most piercing work, without the billowy blissed-out sections he usually manages to work in somewhere". Michael Heumann writing for Stylus Magazine describes the album's texture as "not simply noise; this is music, created and shaped and pruned and dissected into something almost operatic in scope". In a Dusted review by Emerson Dameron, they said that "Radio Amor doesn't compare to anything else currently on the market. Hecker's flickering spirals may, at times, loosely echo the more reflective side of Oval, but take a more direct route to the cortex."

In January 2004, The Wire put the album in its list of the best electronica albums of 2003.

== Track listing ==
All tracks are written by Tim Hecker.

No.	Title	Length
1.	"Song of the Highwire Shrimper"	7:24
2.	"(They Call Me) Jimmy"	4:52
3.	"Spectral"	8:09
4.	"I'm Transmitting Tonight"	5:16
5.	"7000 Miles"	5:43
6.	"Shipyards of La Ceiba"	1:56
7.	"Careless Whispers"	5:11
8.	"The Star Compass"	4:49
9.	"Azure Azure"	10:34
10.	"Trade Winds, White Heat"	4:22
Total length:		58:22
