= Love Streams (album) =

Studio album by Tim Hecker
- Released: April 8, 2016
- Recorded: 2014–2015
- Studio: Greenhouse Studios, Reykjavík, Iceland
- Genre: Experimental
- Length: 42:49
- Label: 4AD; Paper Bag
- Producer: Tim Hecker; Ben Frost

Tim Hecker chronology
Virgins (2013)	Love Streams (2016)	Konoyo (2018)

Singles from Love Streams
- 1. "Castrati Stack" Released: February 19, 2016; 2. "Black Phase" Released: March 30, 2016

Love Streams is the eighth studio album by Canadian electronic music musician Tim Hecker, released on April 8, 2016 on 4AD and Paper Bag Records. The album was recorded throughout 2014 and 2015 at Greenhouse Studios in Reykjavík, Iceland, where parts of Hecker's last two albums Virgins (2013) and Ravedeath, 1972 (2011) were recorded.

== Background and recording ==
The album features Kara-Lis Coverdale and Grímur Helgason, who were both collaborators on Hecker's last album Virgins, as well as contributions from the Icelandic Choir Ensemble, whose vocal arrangements were scored by Icelandic composer Jóhann Jóhannsson. Hecker professed to having thought about ideas like "liturgical aesthetics after Yeezus" and the "transcendental voice in the age of auto-tune" during its creation.

== Critical reception ==
Professional ratings
Aggregate scores
Source	Rating
AnyDecentMusic?	7.9/10
Metacritic	82/100
Review scores
Source	Rating
AllMusic	4/5 stars
The A.V. Club	B
The Guardian	4/5 stars
The Irish Times	4/5 stars
Mojo	4/5 stars
The Observer	4/5 stars
Pitchfork	8.2/10
Q	4/5 stars
Spin	7/10
Uncut	8/10

Love Streams received universal acclaim from critics. On the aggregate score site Metacritic, the album scored at 82 out of 100, indicating "universal acclaim". Pitchfork wrote that "Love Streams marks a subtle shift in Tim Hecker's habitual style, a pivot away from his hazy trademark." PopMatters gave the album nine stars out of ten, stating that "Love Streams is at once familiar and totally alien; a work of art that reminds us why we need art in the first place."

=== Accolades ===
Publication	Accolade	Year	Rank	Ref.
Consequence of Sound	Top 50 Albums of 2016	2016	17	
Pitchfork	The 20 Best Experimental Albums of 2016	2016	—N/a	
The Quietus	Albums of the Year 2016	2016	51	
Stereogum	The 50 Best Albums of 2016	2016	48	

== Track listing ==
All tracks are written by Tim Hecker.

No.	Title	Length
1.	"Obsidian Counterpoint"	4:55
2.	"Music of the Air"	4:08
3.	"Bijie Dream"	2:16
4.	"Live Leak Instrumental"	2:56
5.	"Violet Monumental I"	4:58
6.	"Violet Monumental II"	3:13
7.	"Up Red Bull Creek"	2:41
8.	"Castrati Stack"	4:01
9.	"Voice Crack"	3:14
10.	"Collapse Sonata"	4:12
11.	"Black Phase"	6:15
Total length:		42:49

== Personnel ==
- Jóhann Jóhannsson – choral arrangement
- Icelandic Choir Ensemble – choir
- Owen Roberts – choir conductor
- Ben Frost – studio engineering, additional choral production
- Kara-Lis Coverdale – keyboards
- Paul Corley – additional mixing
- Grímur Helgason – woodwind

== Charts ==
Chart (2016)	Peak position
Belgian Albums (Ultratop Flanders)	86
UK Albums (OCC)	97
Scottish Albums (OCC)	70
UK Dance Albums (OCC)	11
UK Independent Albums (OCC)	18
