= Haunt Me, Haunt Me Do It Again =

Studio album by Tim Hecker
- Released: November 20, 2001
- Recorded: 2000–2001
- Genre: Ambient; glitch
- Length: 53:59
- Label: Alien8; Substractif

Tim Hecker chronology
Haunt Me, Haunt Me Do It Again (2001)	My Love Is Rotten to the Core (2002)

Haunt Me, Haunt Me Do It Again (or simply Haunt Me) is the debut studio album by Canadian electronic musician Tim Hecker. It was released on November 20, 2001, through Substractif, a sub-label of Alien8 Recordings.

== Background ==
The album mixes the digital signal processing of glitch with post-rock structures and melodies. The sounds used for this album, as well as most of Tim Hecker's other works, originate from a guitar, piano, and laptop. The title of the song "The Work of Art in the Age of Cultural Overproduction" is a reference to Walter Benjamin's essay, "The Work of Art in the Age of Mechanical Reproduction". The track "Ghost Writing Pt. 1" samples the American television show Who Wants to be a Millionaire?.

== Release ==
The album was originally released on November 20, 2001, through Substractif. It was re-released on September 24, 2010, through Alien8 Recordings. A remastered edition of the album was released on July 6, 2018, through Kranky.

== Critical reception ==
Professional ratings
Review scores
Source	Rating
AllMusic	4.5/5 stars
The Line of Best Fit	8.5/10
Pitchfork	8.6/10
Resident Advisor	4.2/5

Mark Richard-San of Pitchfork described the album as "a journey into abstract drones and cinematic atmosphere." In 2016, Lindsey Rhoades of Stereogum wrote, "Feeling bound by the trappings of techno, Hecker was already on a different wavelength with Haunt Me, clearly seeking something that would trigger ASMR-induced enlightenment, and he ran with it." In 2018, Evan Lilly of The Line of Best Fit stated, "Within its twenty songs, Haunt Me's entirety lasts less than an hour, but in that time, Hecker manages to transform ambient noise itself into something magnificent."

=== Accolades ===
Accolades for Haunt Me, Haunt Me Do It Again
Publication	List	Rank	Ref.
Pitchfork	Top 50 Albums of 2002	34	

== Track listing ==
All tracks are written by Tim Hecker.

Haunt Me, Haunt Me Do It Again track listing
No.	Title	Length
1.	"Music for Tundra, Part 1"	5:13
2.	"Music for Tundra, Part 2"	1:57
3.	"Music for Tundra, Part 3"	0:39
4.	"Arctic Lover's Rock, Part 1"	5:34
5.	"Arctic Lover's Rock, Part 2"	0:56
6.	"The Work of Art in the Age of Cultural Overproduction"	7:35
7.	"October, Part 1"	3:35
8.	"October, Part 2"	1:08
9.	"Ghost Writing, Part 1"	4:29
10.	"Ghost Writing, Part 2"	1:20
11.	"City in Flames (In Three Parts), Part 1"	2:58
12.	"City in Flames (In Three Parts), Part 2"	2:46
13.	"City in Flames (In Three Parts), Part 3"	0:54
14.	"Borderlines, Part 1"	4:56
15.	"Borderlines, Part 2"	0:21
16.	"Boreal Kiss, Part 1"	3:28
17.	"Boreal Kiss, Part 2"	0:32
18.	"Boreal Kiss, Part 3"	1:59
19.	"Night Flight to Your Heart, Part 1"	2:28
20.	"Night Flight to Your Heart, Part 2"	1:02
Total length:		53:59

== Personnel ==
Credits adapted from liner notes.

- T. Hecker – photography
- C. Minaker – photography
