= Ravedeath, 1972 =

Studio album by Tim Hecker
- Released: February 14, 2011
- Recorded: July 21, 2010
- Studios: Frikirkjan Church, Reykjavík, Iceland
- Genres: Ambient; drone; experimental
- Length: 52:24
- Label: Kranky

Tim Hecker chronology
An Imaginary Country (2009)	Ravedeath, 1972 (2011)	Dropped Pianos (2011)

Ravedeath, 1972 is the sixth studio album by Canadian electronic music musician Tim Hecker, released on February 14, 2011, by Kranky. The album was recorded primarily in Frikirkjan Church, Reykjavík, a location found by Ben Frost. It makes prominent use of pipe organ, and was described by Hecker as "a hybrid of a studio and a live record." It received universal acclaim from critics, with many reviewers acknowledging the album as Hecker's finest.

== Writing, recording and release ==
The album was written by Hecker during early 2010 in Montreal and Banff, Canada. The majority of the album was recorded in Fríkirkjan Church, Reykjavík, Iceland; the location was discovered as a possible recording venue by Frost. Hecker recorded the album on July 21, 2010, playing compositions on the pipe organ which were further complemented by guitar and piano. Following this concentrated recording session, he returned to his studio in Montreal and worked for a month, undertaking the mixing and completing the record. The result, as Hecker described it, is "a hybrid of a studio and a live record."

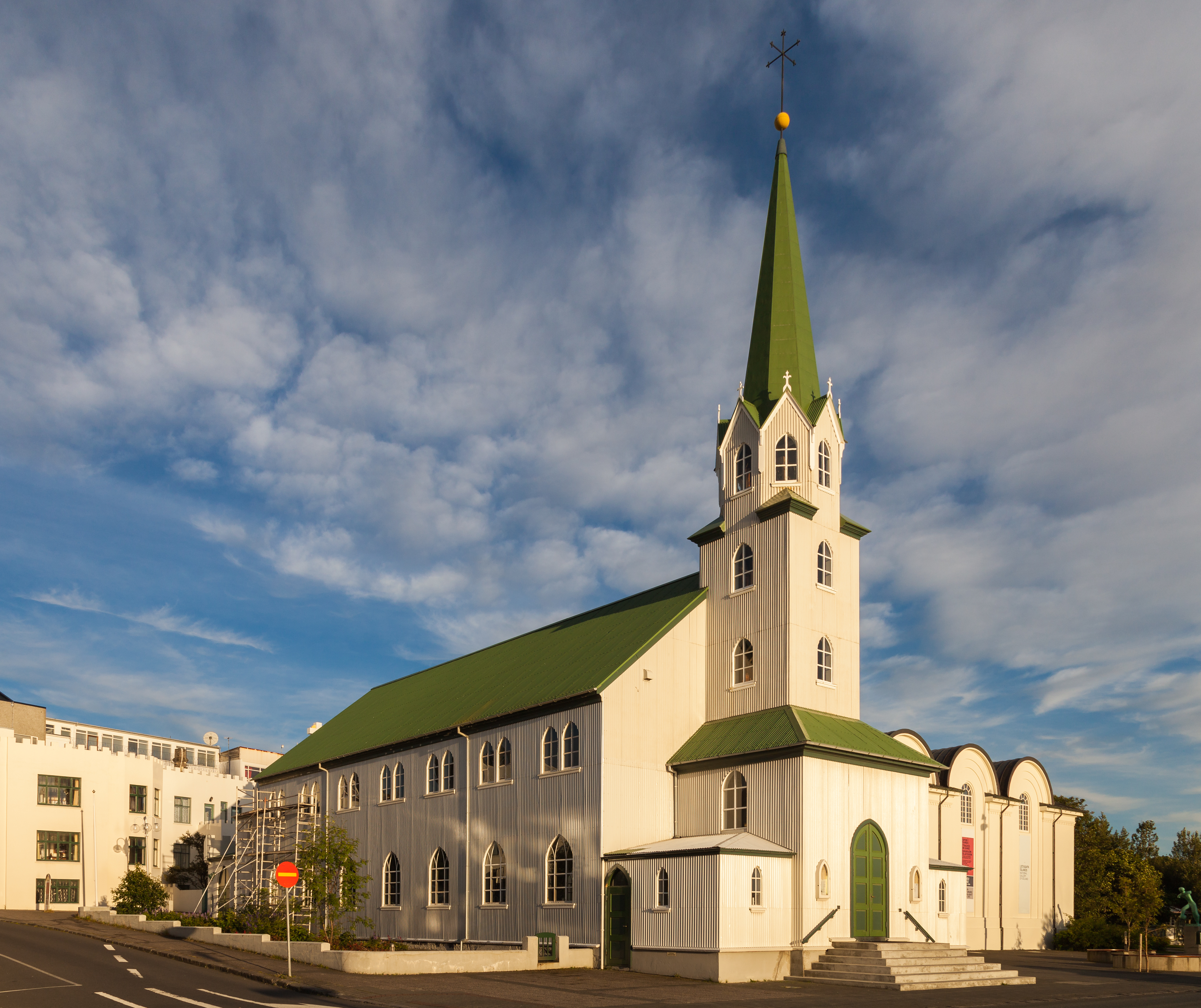
Frikirkjan Church in Reykjavík, Iceland

The cover depicts MIT students pushing a piano off the roof on the undergraduate dorm Baker House in 1972 – an act which began a long-running university ritual. Inspired by "digital garbage – like when the Kazakhstan government cracks down on piracy and there's pictures of 10 million DVDs and CDRs being pushed by bulldozers", Hecker found the artwork and developed the cover concept in a pharmacy, licensing the artwork from the MIT archives and re-photographing the image.

The '1972' of the album's title is a reference to the cover artwork – the inaugural piano drop occurred in 1972 – but the word 'Ravedeath' has unclear connotations to Hecker. At a rave in 2010, the word occurred to Hecker, and became "the wrongest and the most right title ever. It had a life of its own after a while."

The album was released in CD and double LP format by Kranky on February 14, 2011. Hecker subsequently released a companion EP, named Dropped Pianos, later in 2011. It serves as a "starker and colder" counterpoint, utilising "heavy reverb and minor-key tones, produc[ing] lots of negative space". The EP's cover art is a re-photographing of the image used for Ravedeath.

== Sound and structure ==
While an oft-used label, the name "ambient" was deemed a "lazy term" by No Ripcord, but serves as a "tool of recognition" for the album. Beats Per Minute describes the music as "drone-based tempests with a mixture of laptop, keyboard, tape and effects-drenched guitar". The album makes extensive use of pipe organ, which "sets the album's tone from the outset", alongside "[l]ingering piano chords [which] slip over the droning throb of the buried pipe organ"; although "many may not identify an organ as the source of the music at all".

A diverse range of recording artists have been used as reference points to describe the sound and tone of the album. "Studio Suicide" is likened to shoegaze artists My Bloody Valentine and Slowdive, while other parts of the album have called reviewers to invoke Pink Floyd, Bach, Silver Apples and Vangelis. Minimalist composer Terry Riley and guitarist John Martyn are likewise alluded to, while a PopMatters review underlined the power of the album when saying that it can be "more bone-chilling than Cannibal Corpse at their most bloodthirsty."

The album's unique recording context – its location and technique – was deemed a vital component of its sound, one described as "evocative, moving and expressive". Tonally, melody "tends to remain subordinate to texture", meaning "Hecker's music is not easy or accessible. There are hints of melody but these are always subservient to mood, texture and feeling. There is little or no percussion and rhythm is not a prominent element." This results in "a dark and often claustrophobic record", as No Ripcord's Marc Higgins concludes that "the record is awash with the feeling of isolation".

Reviewers found that the record did not conform to a typical structure. As a PopMatters reviewer analyzed, "The record seems to have no center, no shining single moment, no climax or vortex. Instead it hovers lightly but ominously, like the notes in the songs themselves, hanging in midair without ever dropping to the floor. Each time a track threatens to spill over and crash, it doesn’t." There was, however, a divide to be found; the second half's tracks "are subtler than those in the first half and give the album a sense of balance and a natural arc". In Hecker's own words, "In the beginning, it's a false start, a kind of a turn-away, like 'Don't cross. This river it's filled with blood,' or something... [But] that tension and anxiety slowly dissipates towards the end of the record and it has an almost romantic finish to it."

== Theme ==
"[Music is] this thing that fills everyone's lives all of the time, but it's this thing that is completely taken for granted, and it's also totally fickle and it's infuriating and it's overloading you and it's often not good [...] It's often not done very well and there's also a system of production that doesn't reward people who do it well, so it's kind of fucked up in a lot of ways."

— Tim Hecker, interviewed by Vincent Pollard

Reviewers roundly acknowledged the album's thematic centre, as the album "seems to be pointing at an end to music, or the endlessness of music". A MusicOMH review expands on this: "[o]ne of Hecker's major concerns is decline and degradation. The album's title and a number of the individual track titles suggest that this preoccupation is still very much in his mind. Yet the titles also suggest some sort of internal, personal conflict – perhaps even a crisis of confidence." Joe Colly's Pitchfork review delves deeper into this idea: "it seems that the organ sounds Hecker captured back in that Rejkjavik church represent a certain purity of sound and that the digital noise battering it throughout act as the enemy, the corrosive effect. There's an ongoing struggle between the two that's mirrored in the menacing song titles and gripping cover art. It's important, then, that the album closes with "In the Air III", a track that features almost no interference whatsoever, just the plinking organ by itself. If I'm reading it right, it feels like Hecker's point is that music, in its purest form, survives no matter what you throw at it".

== Reception ==
Professional ratings
Aggregate scores
Source	Rating
AnyDecentMusic?	8.0/10
Metacritic	86/100
Review scores
Source	Rating
AllMusic	4/5 stars
The A.V. Club	A−
Drowned in Sound	9/10
Fact	4.5/5
Mojo	4/5 stars
MusicOMH	5/5 stars
NME	7/10
Pitchfork	8.6/10
Resident Advisor	4.0/5
Uncut	4/5 stars

Ravedeath, 1972 received widespread acclaim from music critics upon release. At Metacritic, which assigns a normalized rating out of 100 to reviews from mainstream critics, the album has an average score of 86 out of 100, which indicates "universal acclaim" based on 17 reviews. The album has been described as Hecker's "most claustrophobic", in the same breath as being "his most powerful", and his "most successful" album. Reviewers for Pitchfork and Rock Sound acclaimed it as Hecker's "finest work to date". Set in the context of the ambient genre, Beats Per Minute's Ian Barker holds that it "quietly stand[s] a shade taller than many of its peers".

Both Pitchfork and Uncut placed the album at number 30 on their respective lists of the top 50 albums of 2011, while The Quietus named the album #3 on its rundown the top albums of 2011. The album was longlisted for the Canada-based 2011 Polaris Music Prize, and in March 2011 it won the Juno Award for best Canadian Electronic music album. In 2019, Pitchfork ranked the album at number 136 on their list of "The 200 Best Albums of the 2010s".

== Track listing ==
All tracks are written by Tim Hecker.

No.	Title	Length
1.	"The Piano Drop"	2:54
2.	"In the Fog I"	4:52
3.	"In the Fog II"	6:01
4.	"In the Fog III"	5:01
5.	"No Drums"	3:24
6.	"Hatred of Music I"	6:11
7.	"Hatred of Music II"	4:22
8.	"Analog Paralysis, 1978"	3:52
9.	"Studio Suicide, 1980"	3:25
10.	"In the Air I"	4:12
11.	"In the Air II"	4:08
12.	"In the Air III"	4:02
Total length:		52:24

== Personnel ==
Writing and performing

- Tim Hecker – writing and recording

Technical

- Paul Corley – engineering
- Ben Frost – engineering and additional piano
- David Nakamoto – artwork layout
- James Plotkin – mastering

== Release history ==
Date	Label	Catalogue number	Format
14 February 2011	Kranky	krank154	2×LP
14 February 2011	Kranky	krank154	CD
