= Tim Hecker =

Canadian electronic musician (born 1974)

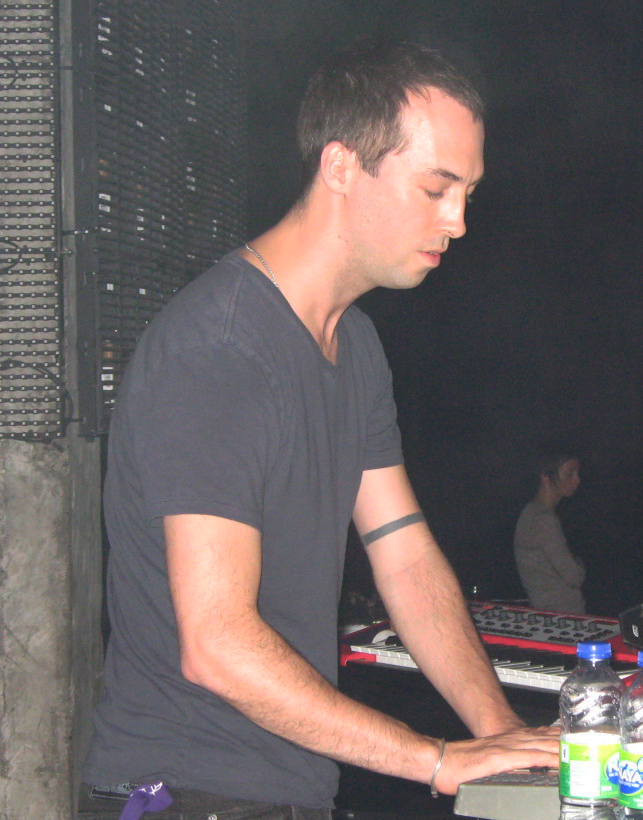
- Hecker performing in 2010

Background information
- Also known as: Jetone
- Born: July 17, 1974 (age 52); Vancouver, British Columbia, Canada
- Origin: Montreal, Quebec, Canada
- Genres: Electronic; ambient; experimental; avant-garde; minimal; noise
- Occupation: Composer
- Instrument: Electronics
- Years active: 1996–present
- Labels: Mille Plateaux; Alien8; Force Inc.; Staalplaat; Fat Cat; Kranky; Paper Bag Records; Software Recording Co.; 4AD; New Amsterdam
- Website: sunblind.net

Tim Hecker (born July 17, 1974) is a Canadian electronic musician, producer, composer, and sound artist. His work, spanning albums such as Harmony in Ultraviolet (2006), Ravedeath, 1972 (2011) and Virgins (2013), has been widely critically acclaimed. He has released eleven albums and a number of EPs in addition to a number of film scores and collaborations with artists such as Arca, Ben Frost, Jóhann Jóhannsson, Daniel Lopatin, and Aidan Baker.

== Biography ==
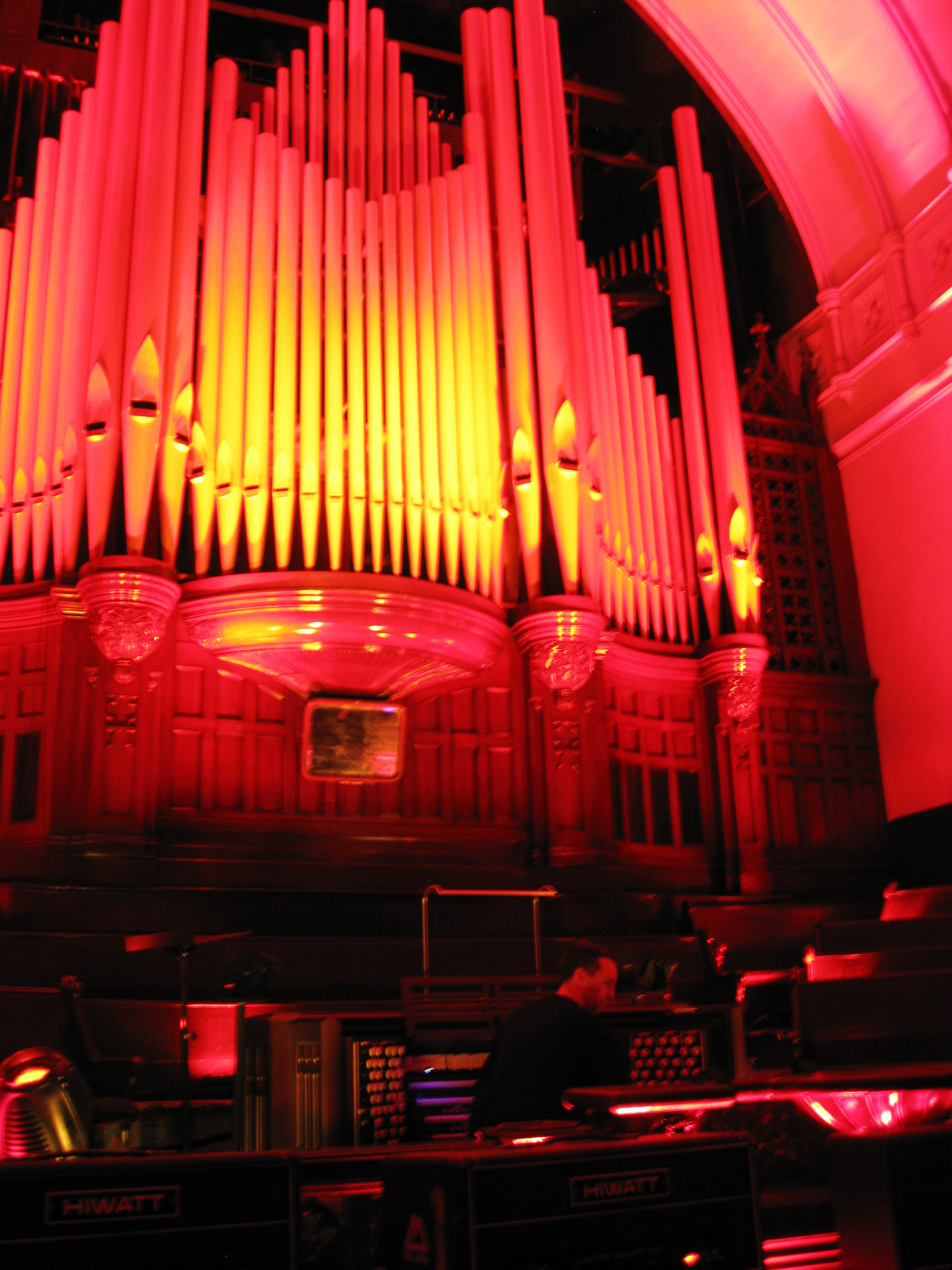
Hecker performing at Mutek Montréal in 2012.

Born in Vancouver, British Columbia, Hecker is the son of two art teachers. During his high school years, he played in rock bands with friends, before acquiring a sampler and working on solo material. He moved to Montreal, Quebec in 1998 to study at Concordia University and explore his artistic interests further. He initially performed as a techno producer under the name Jetone, debuting in 1996. By 2001 he became disenchanted with the musical direction of the Jetone project. In 2001, Hecker released the album Haunt Me, Haunt Me Do It Again, under his own name through the label Alien8. He followed with Radio Amor (2003) and Mirages (2004).

In 2006, he moved to Kranky where he released his fourth album Harmony in Ultraviolet. He subsequently incorporated the use of pipe organ sounds which were digitally processed and distorted. The album was called the 9th best ambient album of all time by Pitchfork in 2016. For the album Ravedeath, 1972 (2011), Hecker traveled to Iceland where together with Ben Frost, he recorded parts in a church. The album was awarded the Juno Award for Electronic Album of the Year. In November 2010, Alien8 re-released Hecker's debut album on vinyl. His live performances contain improvisations by processing organ sounds that are manipulated, with great fluctuations in volume.

In 2012, Hecker collaborated with Daniel Lopatin (who also records as Oneohtrix Point Never) on an improvisatory project which became Instrumental Tourist. Following 2013's Virgins, Hecker returned to Reykjavík, Iceland for sessions in 2014 and 2015, to create what would become Love Streams. Collaborators include Ben Frost, Johann Johannsson, Kara-Lis Coverdale and Grimur Helgason, whilst the 15th century choral works by Josquin des Prez birthed the foundations of the album. In February 2016, it was announced that Hecker had signed with 4AD while Love Streams was released in April of that year.

In addition to touring with Godspeed You! Black Emperor, Sigur Rós, and recording with the likes of Fly Pan Am, Hecker has also collaborated with the likes of Arca and Aidan Baker. He has also contributed remixes to other artists, including Ellen Allien, John Cale, Isis, and Interpol.

== Art ==
Hecker occasionally makes sound installations and has collaborated with visual artists such as Stan Douglas and Charles Stankievech.

Hecker, along with other musicians Ben Frost, Steve Goodman (Kode9), Piotr Jakubowicz, Marcel Weber (MFO), and Manuel Sepulveda (Optigram), provided music for Unsound Festival's sensory installation, Ephemera.

Hecker composed the score for Damien Jalet's performance piece, Planet [wanderer].

== Film ==
Hecker composed the score for 2016's The Free World, selected to be shown in the U.S. Dramatic Competition section at the 2016 Sundance Film Festival. He composed the score for BBC Two drama series The North Water directed by Andrew Haigh and based on Ian McGuire's novel of the same name.

Hecker also composed the score for the Austrian drama and horror film Luzifer, which won the Best Actor Award for Franz Rogowski at Fantastic Fest in 2021 and Best Actress Award for Susanne Jensen and Best Actor Award for Franz Rogowski at the 2021 Sitges Film Festival.

Hecker composed the score for Infinity Pool, the 2023 film by Canadian director Brandon Cronenberg, starring Alexander Skarsgård and Mia Goth, which premiered at the Sundance Film Festival.

== Personal life ==
Hecker pursued a professional career outside music, working as a policy analyst for the Canadian Government in the early 2000s. After leaving his employment in 2006 he enrolled at McGill University to study for a PhD, completing it in 2014 with a thesis on loud sound as a productive force between 1880 and 1930, supervised by Jonathan Sterne. He has also worked there as a lecturer in sound culture in the Art History and Communications department.

Hecker is a Buddhist and a former Catholic. He started studying Buddhism and practiced meditation in his studio during the start of the COVID-19 pandemic.

== Discography ==
- Haunt Me, Haunt Me Do It Again (2001)
- Radio Amor (2003)
- Mirages (2004)
- Harmony in Ultraviolet (2006)
- An Imaginary Country (2009)
- Ravedeath, 1972 (2011)
- Virgins (2013)
- Love Streams (2016)
- Konoyo (2018)
- Anoyo (2019)
- No Highs (2023)
- Shards (2025)

== See also ==
- List of ambient music artists
