= Radiance and Submission =

Studio album by CFCF
- Released: July 31, 2015
- Recorded: 2013–14
- Genre: New age; electro-funk; classical; pop; chamber jazz; ambient; balearic
- Length: 34:18
- Label: Driftless Recordings
- Producer: Michael Silver

CFCF chronology
Outside (2013)	Radiance and Submission (2015)	"The Colours of Life" (2015)

Singles from Radiance and Submission
- 1. "The Ruined Map" Released: June 4, 2015; 2. "La Soufrière" Released: July 16, 2015

Radiance and Submission is the third studio album of Canadian electronic musician Michael Silver, known by his stage name as CFCF. Silver was inspired to make Radiance and Submission from his purchase of an acoustic guitar. Therefore, the LP involves numerous guitar melodies and harmonies playing at the same time. It was released on July 31, 2015 by the label Driftless Recordings and was Silver's first Billboard entry, peaking at number eight on the magazine's American New Age Albums chart. Radiance and Submission garnered a mixed critical reception upon its distribution.

== Recording and concept ==
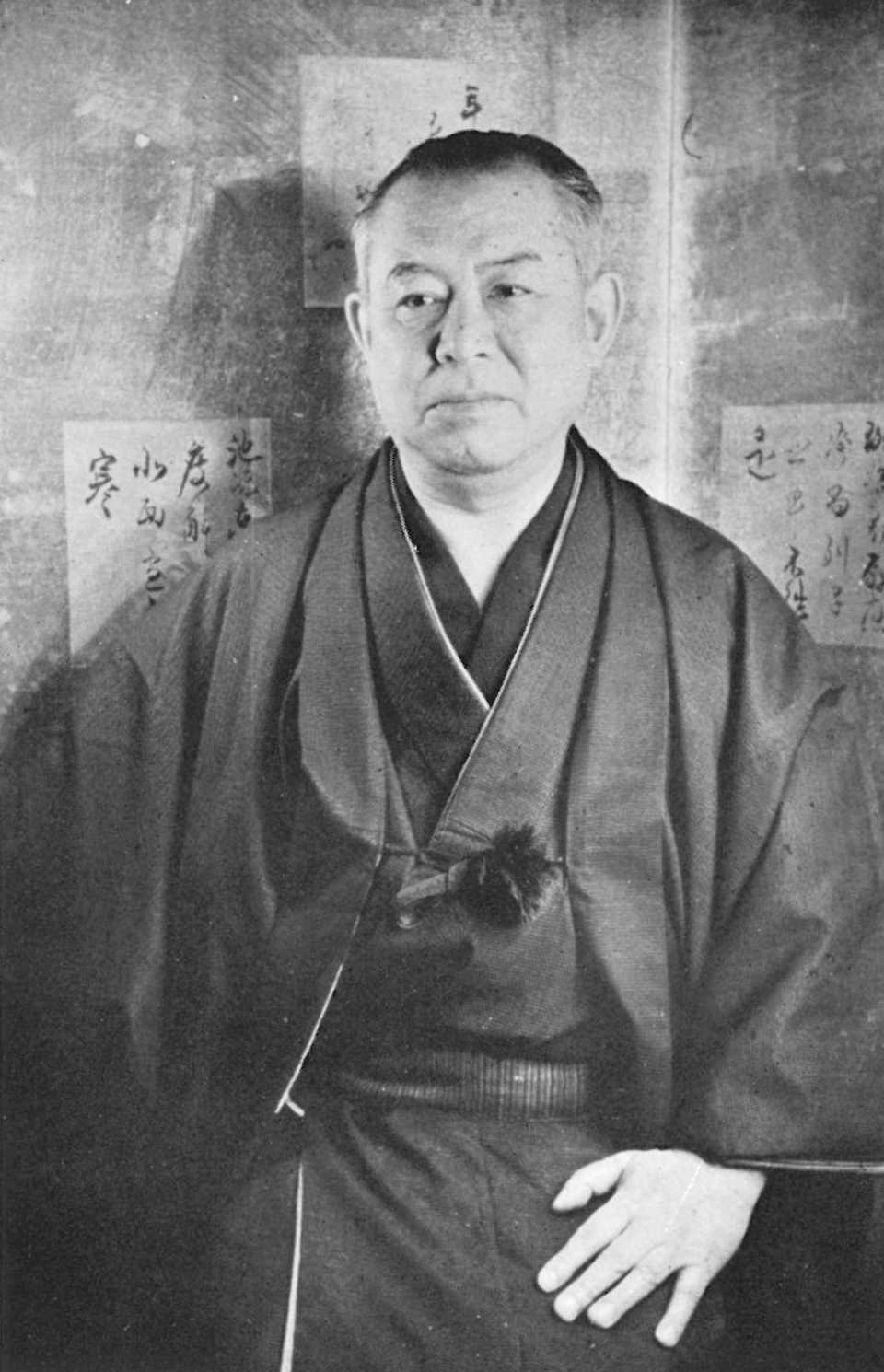
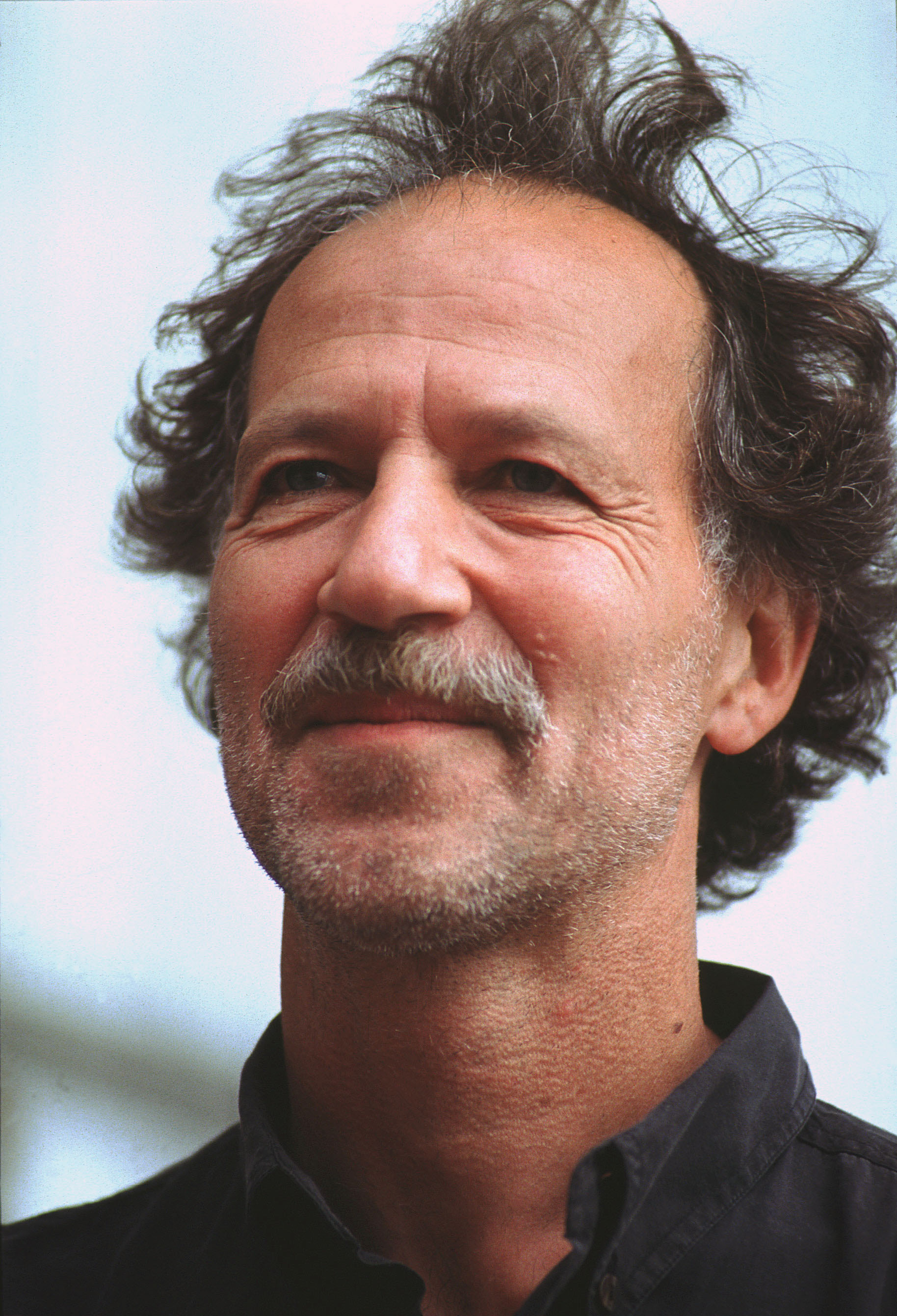
The title of the tracks on Radiance and Submissions include references to the works of Jun'ichirō Tanizaki (left) and Werner Herzog (right).

Radiance and Submission was recorded in the winter of 2013 to 2014. The album deals with themes of isolation, which, according to Ian King of The Line of Best Fit, may have been a result of how Silver felt when he produced the album in the winter. For the album, Silver went for a record that represented a paradox of “non-time, non-being, non-death.” As a Spectrum Culture critic analyzed the music's relationship with Matsuda Matsuo's cover art for Radiance and Submission, "[the artwork consists of] a cold scene, a family of sorts, kneeling, seeming to mourn the death of a unknown figure, beside a conceptual lake or seaside, [and] the long echoy synth-leads call upon an open space and [are] almost animalistic in its tone and flavor."

The names of the tracks on Radiance and Submission are based on the titles of Japanese writings and the films of German filmmaker Werner Herzog. The title of “In Praise of Shadows” is also the name of Jun'ichirō Tanizaki's essay about Japanese aesthetics, the name of “The Ruined Map” is the title of a 1967 book by Kōbō Abe, and "La Soufrière" is titled after Herzog's 1977 documentary about an erupting volcano. Herzog previously had a major influence on Silver's music when he recorded his EP The River (2010), which was based on Herzog's Fitzcarraldo (1982).

== Composition ==
Radiance and Submission is mostly an instrumental record, exceptions being the tracks "The Ruined Map" and "La Soufriere" which feature vocal performances from Silver. Silver categorized Radiance and Submission as a hybrid of folk, classical, modern pop music, and chamber jazz. The music mainly consists of numerous acoustic guitar melodies and harmonies being performed simultaneously; Silver was inspired to make an album of this style after he purchased a guitar, and he listened to the improvisational guitar works of Pat Metheny, Terry Callier, and Terje Rypdal while producing Radiance and Submission. The album includes a mixture of both digital and acoustic sounds that have an "even struggle for dominance throughout," wrote Craig Clemens of Spectrum Culture.

A review by Justin Pearson published in Soundblab described Radiance and Submission as "less of a background and more of a backdrop. Instead of fading into your surroundings, it augments them in the manner of a curtain, closing off all the unnecessary aspects to shine a light on the now. It brings into focus whatever your current surroundings are and stages that location, whether physically or emotionally." Radiance and Submission has a much more minimal structure than CFCF's previous album Outside (2013), where "even in busier moments, there is sufficient enough breathing room to catch each sound and instrument’s subtle exhalations," wrote King. King also described it as somewhere between CFCF's extended plays Exercises (2012), a record where each song sounded the same, and Music for Objects (2013), where all of its tracks sound very disparate from each other: "Each song [on Radiance and Submission] sets out to achieve something apart from the others, but the motion between them is often fluid."

== Critical reception ==
Professional ratings
Aggregate scores
Source	Rating
AnyDecentMusic?	6.1/10
Metacritic	67/100
Review scores
Source	Rating
Consequence of Sound	C+
Exclaim!	6/10
In Your Speakers	63/100
The Line of Best Fit	7.5/10
Now	3/5 Ns
Pitchfork	6.9/10
Soundblab	7/10
Spectrum Culture	3/5 stars
State	3/5 stars

Pearson, in a favorable review of Radiance and Submission, opined, "Radiance and Submission plays out like a collection of inward-seeking moments that serves to highlight those pure, specific feelings of time and place – the ones unbothered by intrusion from the outside." Clemens enjoyed the album as being the most "complex" from other new age music, highlighting the record's "compositional techniques, such as his ability to develop and articulate counter-point and his ability to set a scene with nothing more than well-constructed sound to get his point across." However, he also opined that the short length of each track was a major drawback of the record: "Silver has spent so much time and effort to build a song up to this great climax, but then just gives up." Pitchfork's Clayton Purdom was another critic that highlighted the album's compositional methods, more specifically its use of "interstitial moments:" "The establishing shots and denouements of his compositions are here turned into the raw material for something strange and fascinating and (for him, at least) new."

Journalist Benjamin Boles gave the album a score of a three out of five, calling its first half the "weakest" part and the rest of the record the most "interesting," where "Silver's soft vocals begin to give the songs a sharper focus and a human vulnerability." Ali Van Houten of In Your Speakers wrote that while Radiance and Submission was decent, it wasn't worth more than one listen, reasoning that it "gets bogged down in the territory of aimless ambience." Similarly, James Glynn of State magazine labeled the album as a "lovely, yet largely unexciting listen" and "a triumph of elegance over endeavour." He explained that, despite its "crisp production," "tranquil composition," and "intriguing musical variations," it "lacks spice." A reviewer for the webzine Treble, however, was much harsher on the album's contrived and aimless quality, calling it "unacceptable" given Silver's past experiences of experimenting with styles that were more "loud and even scary." Some reviewers criticized the album's combination of acoustic folk and electronic music. Writer Matthew Sedacca found it to be "finicky," stating that "Silver attempts to force stylistic egalitarianism, the two sides of his composition awkwardly failing to join." An Exclaim! journalist opined than the album was a "stunningly simple, meditative listen" for only "a handful of moments," writing that "the Montreal musician attempts a serene matrimony of the two musical sides that struggles to strike a balance between stimulating and stale when it comes to the record's overarching sound."

== Track listing ==
All songs written and produced by Michael Silver.

No.	Title	Length
1.	"In Praise Of Shadows"	4:07
2.	"Sculptures Of Sand"	3:43
3.	"A Various Language (From The Same Hill)"	3:54
4.	"Tethered In Dark"	6:56
5.	"The Ruined Map"	2:58
6.	"Blanketed In Snow A Place Returned"	3:50
7.	"La Soufrière"	3:15
8.	"Two Mirrors"	5:35
Total length:		34:18

Sample credits

- "A Various Language (From The Same Hill)" is adapted from the piece "From The Same Hill" by Brian Eno.

== Release history ==
Region	Date	Format(s)	Label
Worldwide	July 31, 2015	Cassette; CD; digital download	Driftless Recordings

== Charts ==
Chart (2015)	Peak position
US New Age Albums (Billboard)	8
