= The Colours of Life =

Studio album (composition) by CFCF
- Released: August 14, 2015
- Recorded: 2011
- Genres: New age; electronic; ambient
- Length: 40:43
- Label: 1080p
- Producer: CFCF

CFCF chronology
| Radiance and Submission (2015) | "The Colours of Life" (2015) | On Vacation (2016) |

"The Colours of Life'" is a composition written and recorded in 2011 by Canadian electronic musician Michael Silver, known by his stage name as CFCF. The 40-minute, twelve-movement track was influenced by what Silver described as "some really cornball music," such as the works of singer Phil Collins and the Windham Hill label. The style Silver went for with "The Colours of Life" was "call waiting background music, just the most pleasant thing and kind of trying to push to the edges of tolerable cheese in some places, but also have it be totally sincere and not ironic, like actually purely pleasurable music."

"The Colours of Life" was first submitted to RVNG Intl. for inclusion on the label's series FRKWYS, with founder Matt Werth suggesting that lead vocals should be recorded over the instrumentals. Vocals from several contributors, such as Japanese duo Dip in the Pool, were recorded and mixed. However, the contributors left the project before they signed the contracts, thus removing the lead vocals and delaying the composition's release. It was finally issued by label 1080p on August 14, 2015 to favorable reviews from music journalists, a common praise being its use of 1980s sounds.

== History ==
"The Colours of Life" was influenced by what Michael Silver described as "some really cornball music." Silver wanted to make music similar to the song "Hand in Hand" by English singer Phil Collins; he intended to produce "call waiting background music, just the most pleasant thing and kind of trying to push to the edges of tolerable cheese in some places, but also have it be totally sincere and not ironic, like actually purely pleasurable music." He wanted "The Colours of Life" to have the vibe of a "weird, transporting nostalgia" to "faded media memories of utopia." In making "The Colours of Life," he also garnered inspiration from the works of label Windham Hill, Manuel Gottsching and Suzanne Ciani, as well as Balearic music.

Michael Silver began creating "The Colours of Life" on a laptop in the first half of 2011 while living in a Paris apartment. When writing the first song for what was initially planned to be an album titled The Colours of Life, Silver felt it should "morph" into another track "for whatever reason." He then kept making songs that transitioned into other tracks until he created a 40-minute piece of "12 pure pop instrumentals" that serve as its movements. As Silver explained, "It was fun for me because having 2-3 minutes per song and a larger structure meant I could write small simple chord progressions and melodies that I maybe wouldn’t have explored on single tracks, and it meant I could go and meander here and get really specific there." "The Colours of Life" was completed in the summer of 2011.

Silver sent "The Colours of Life" to Matt Werth, the founder of the label RVNG Intl. which released the CFCF extended play The River (2010). Werth suggested to Silver lead vocalists should be added to the composition. Thus, vocal contributions where recorded and mixed into the songs. One of these contributors was Japanese duo Dip in the Pool, who contributed two songs to the composition; one of these tracks appears on the duo's album Highwire Walker (2015). Traces of the work done by Dip in the Pool are on the movements “Rain Dance” and “Intimacy," where keyboardist Tatsuji Kimura "elaborated" on the chord progressions.

"The Colours of Life" was originally planned to be a part of RVNG Intl.'s FRKWYS series. However, when the time came for the vocalists to sign contracts in order for "The Colours of Life" to be released, some of the singers were too nervous for it to be issued and left the project. This caused the vocal parts to be removed and for the track to not be released as part of the FRKWYS series. As Silver explained in the press release for "The Colour of Life," "we got some contributions from really amazing people, but the thing sadly fell apart for reasons I won’t go into." On August 4, 2015, two movements from "The Colours of Life," "Intimacy" and "Night Music," premiered via a VHS-quality nature music video directed by Bleu Nuit Video's Rob Feulner. "The Colours of Life" was finally released by 1080p on August 14, 2015.

== Composition ==
"The Colours of Life" is a suite lasting for 40 minutes and 43 seconds and divided into 12 movements:

1. "Departure" (0:00–3:54)
2. "Melting the Ice" (3:54–7:35)
3. "Our World" (7:35–11:02)
4. "The Pyramid" (11:02–13:45)
5. "Rain Dance" (13:45–17:42)
6. "Intimacy" (17:42–20:52)
7. "Nightmusic" (20:52–24:27)
8. "Tropical Realities (24:27–26:27)
9. "A Real Dream" (26:27–29:07)
10. "Imagination" (29:07–33:07)
11. "Touching the Earth" (33:07–36:07)
12. "Return" (36:07–40:43)

Most of the movements play at a tempo of around 100 beats per minute and are in a 4/4 time signature. "The Colours of Life" garnered comparisons to Göttsching's record E2-E4 (1984) by multiple reviewers. Journalist Paul Simpson categorized the composition as a Berlin school-style Peter Gabriel or Wally Badarou track with elements of worldbeat.

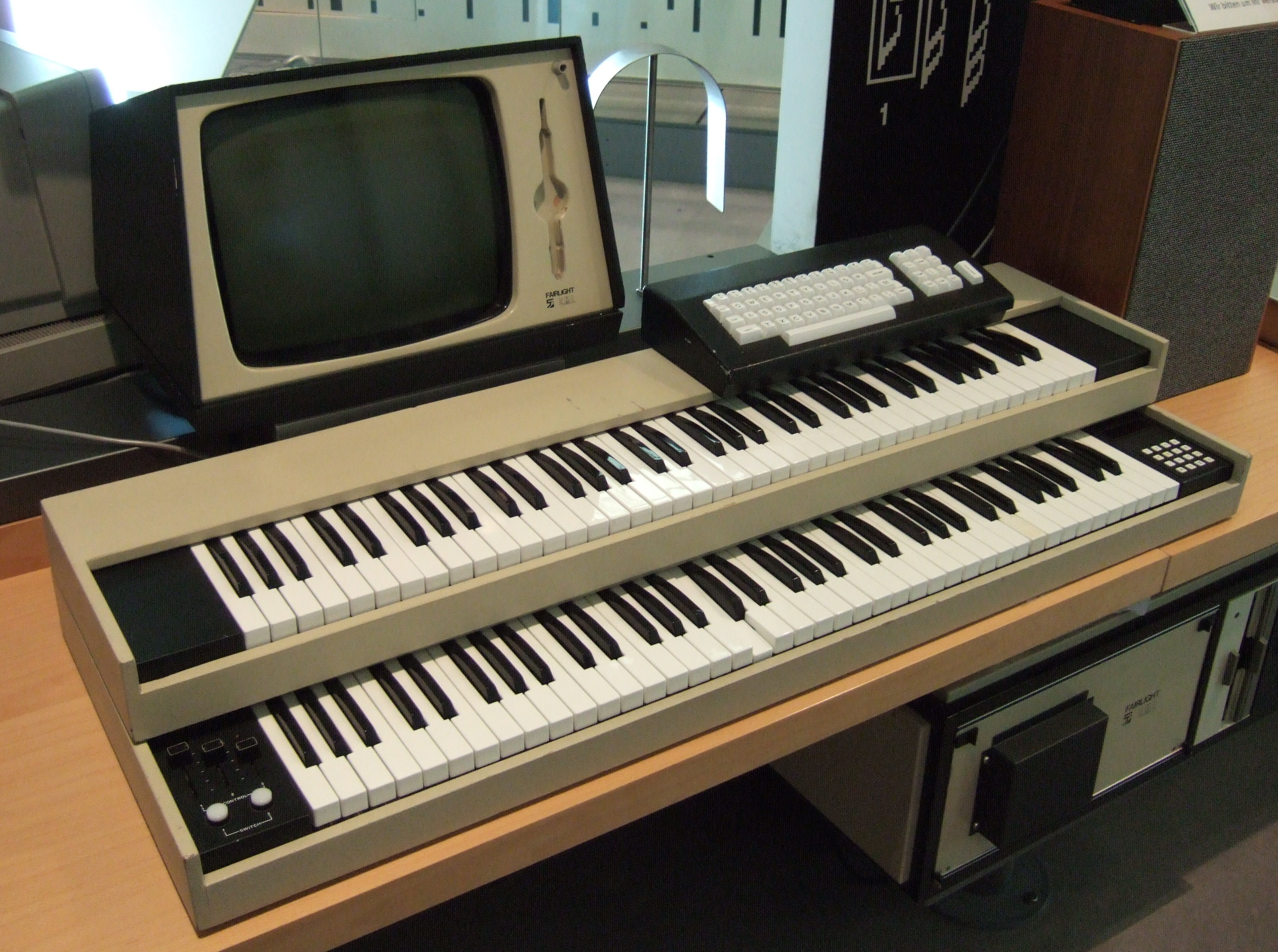
Sounds from the Fairlight CMI are featured on The Colours of Life.

"The Colours of Life" uses sounds from the sampler Fairlight CMI, which artists including Gabriel have used in their works released in the 1980s. The piece has an instrumentation of digitally-produced xylophones, pan flutes and drum machines present throughout. Riffs performed by synthesized trumpets and strings, saxophones, and pianos are also in the composition. Critic Andy Beta wrote that while elements of new age and the works of Collins and Windham Hill were present in CFCF's past releases, "The Colours of Life"'s use of these elements is where the composition differs from the rest of Silver's discography: "CFCF transcends such influences and the tags associated with high and low art, and instead seeks a true synthesis of all those silky textures."

Critic Patric Fallon suggests that there are two stories on "The Colours of Life." One involves a beach someone is transported to through synesthesia, as suggested by the ocean wave sound effects, pan flutes and xylophones in the piece. Another story is suggested by the titles of each of the movements, such as "Departure," "The Pyramid," "A Real Dream," "Imagination" and "Return." These names and the sounds of their respective tracks suggest a sort of unordinary, metaphysical adventure.

== Artwork ==
The artwork for "The Colours of Life" was designed by Bobby Houlihan. The cover art depicts a taxonomy-style table of animal paintings Houlihan found near a Brooklyn public school, which represents the movements of the composition. At the bottom of the artwork is a list of the movements presented in the humanist sans-serif typeface Optima; the typeface was used in memory of its designer, Hermann Zapf, who died while "The Colours of Life"'s cover art was being made. It was also used to align with the corny style of the musical content. The cover art was awarded one of Redefine magazine's "Album Covers of the Year" accolades.

== Critical reception ==
Professional ratings
Review scores
| Source | Rating |
|---|---|
| AllMusic | 4/5 stars |
| Resident Advisor | 4/5 |
| [sic] | 9.5/10 |

Simpson called "The Colours of Life" "thoroughly enjoyable," praising the composition's "meditative quality" and "impeccable" development of melody and pace. He wrote, "While Silver's obsession with '80s sounds at their smoothest and most synthetic might be off-putting to some, he approaches them with such sincerity that it doesn't sound condescending in the least." Fallon, reviewing for Resident Advisor, honored "The Colours of Life" as the best CFCF release yet, writing that it involves Silver "delivering his best ideas with an effortlessness wrought by years of experience." He highlighted its "well-paced sequencing and the breadth of skill at work in its arrangements," its "keen sense of restraint and impeccably timed delivery," and how each movement transitions "so seamlessly with no lack of care and detail in every phase."

Luke Bradley of [sic] magazine jokingly honored "The Colours of Life" as "essentially the epitome of what every kid making vapourwave wishes they could produce, but know they cannot because they lack the talent or the creativity of someone like CFCF to craft such a thing of ineffable beauty." He called it superior to most releases with elements of retro music; he wrote that most music uses works "of a previous generation as a raw material to be distorted and tinkered with," whereas "The Colours of Life" "is building on the foundations of that past to create something new and wonderful."

== Track listing ==
- Cassette/CD/digital download
1. "The Colours of Life" – 40:43

== Personnel ==
Derived from the liner notes of The Colours Of Life and the official 1080p Bandcamp.

- Written, produced and recorded in 2011 by Michael Silver
- Saxophone by Al Carlson
- Writing, keyboards, and programming on "Rain Dance" and "Intimacy" by Tatsuji Kimura
- Mastered by Josh Stevenson at Otic Mastering
- Artwork by The Kids Of P.S. 261 Brooklyn
- Design by Bobby Houlihan

== Release history ==
| Region | Date | Format(s) | Label |
|---|---|---|---|
| Worldwide | August 14, 2015 | Cassette; CD; digital download | 1080p |
