= Outside (CFCF album) =

Studio album by CFCF
- Released: October 16, 2013
- Studio: Breakglass Studios in Montreal, Quebec; Joao Carvalho Mastering in Toronto, Ontario
- Genre: New age; soft rock; hypnagogic pop; ambient; synthpop; progressive rock; dream pop
- Length: 52:06
- Label: Paper Bag; Dummy
- Producer: CFCF

CFCF chronology
Music for Objects (2013)	Outside (2013)	Radiance and Submission (2015)

Singles from Outside
- 1. "Jump Out of the Train" Released: August 1, 2013; 2. "Beyond Light" Released: September 27, 2013

Outside is the second studio album of Canadian electronic musician Michael Silver, known by his stage name as CFCF. Silver began work on a second CFCF LP shortly after the release of his debut album Continent (2009) in order to increase his reputation of being more than just a "house DJ." The record has feelings of being tired and hoping to reach something, which was influenced by Silver's experience in traveling to and from places such as New York, Toronto, and Montreal. He would often look at other landscapes while he was bored during travels and became "immersed" in the fantasies caused by looking at them.

Outside uses several elements of 1980s music by acts such as Peter Gabriel and Phil Collins. Outside was the first album where Silver's vocals served as the foreground of some tracks, and features background vocal contributions from artists such as Stefanie Franciotti, Active Child, and Johan Tuvesson. The album's atmosphere was inspired by Bonnie 'Prince' Billy's record The Letting Go (2006), and Outside features a cover of a track from that LP titled "Strange Form of Life."

The songs were arranged in Logic Pro and taken to Breakglass Studios in Montreal in 2012 to be re-recorded. Promoted with two pre-album-release tracks, "Jump Out of the Train" and "Beyond Light" and two music videos for "Beyond Light" and "Strange Form of Life," Outside was distributed by Paper Bag Records and Dummy Records digitally in October 2013 and on vinyl in November 2013. Responses towards Outside from professional reviewers upon release were generally average, some critics having mixed opinions towards how Silver changed his sound and style for the LP as well as his vocal performances. Outsiders, released in May 2014, is a set of four remixes of tracks from Outside as well as two B-sides.

== Concept ==
Outside was inspired by Silver's favorite Bonnie 'Prince' Billy album The Letting Go (2006), as well as The Sensual World (1989) by Kate Bush and Peter Gabriel’s record Security (1982). Silver was focused on The Letting Go's "earthy" atmosphere, explaining that "it kind of creates this fantastical world" that has a "kind of wintry, forlorn quality, but is [also] at peace." Outside is intended to represent the feelings of a human being tired and expected to reach something soon while traveling. Silver intended to make an album with this vibe based on experiences on traveling back and forth from Toronto to Montreal as well Montreal to New York: "The reasons for travel didn't really play into the album -- it was really journey itself, and getting kind of lost in transit, watching the landscape go by and being immersed in those surroundings -- kind of as a fantasy in contrast to the boredom and restlessness of being on those long journeys." Silver described Outside as different from most new age albums in that it involves the feeling of being "separat[ed] from nature, rather than being immersed in" it.

== Production and composition ==
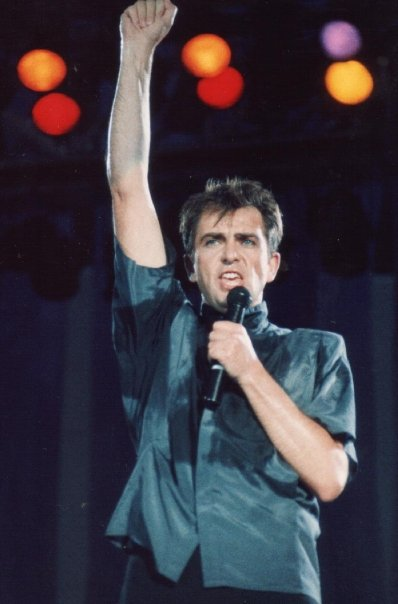
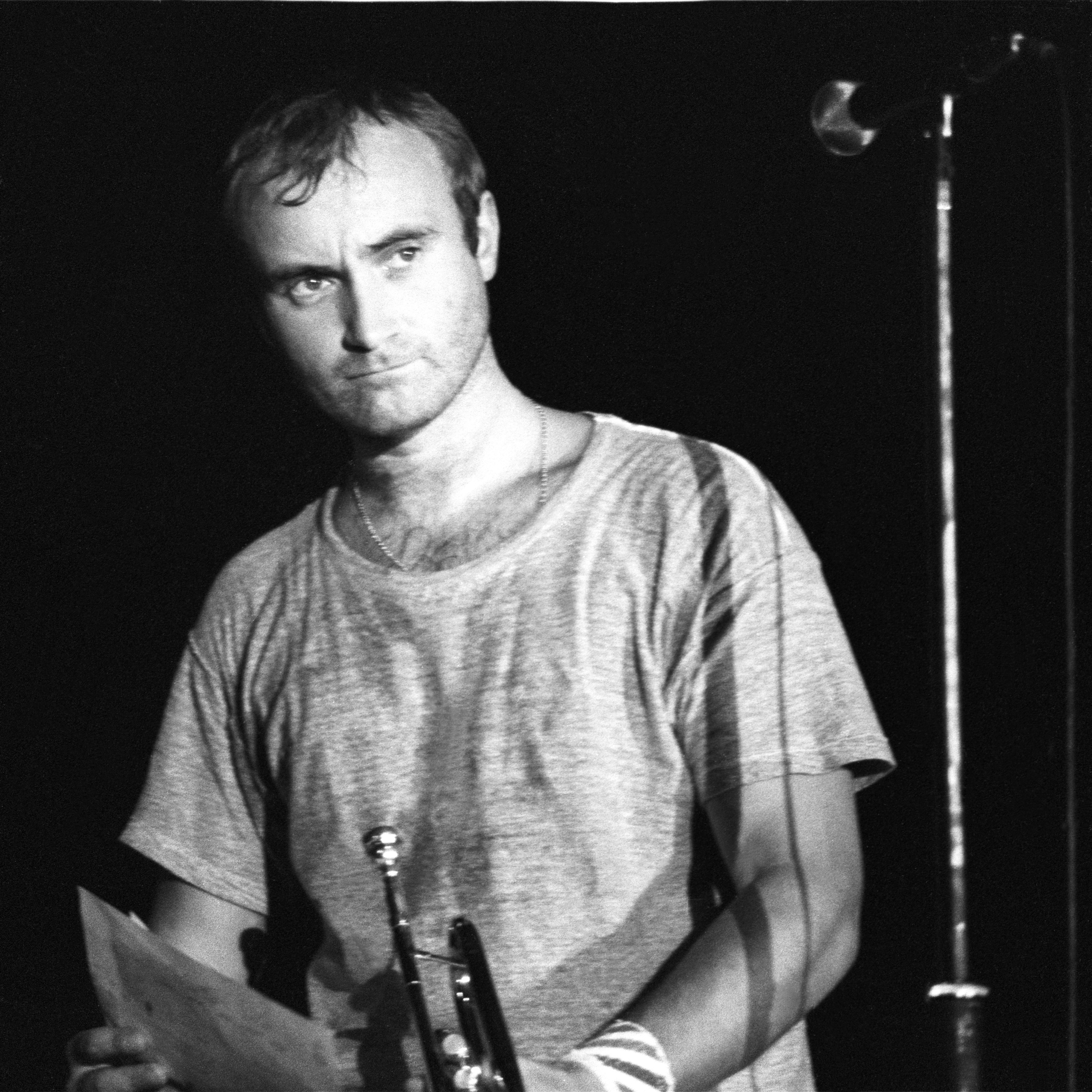
Outside features elements of 1980s music by acts such as Peter Gabriel (left) and Phil Collins (right).

Writing for a second CFCF album began in 2010, shortly after the release of Silver's debut album Continent (2009). His initial plan for making another LP was to expand his musical abilities and move away from doing "beat-orientated" work that had him labelled as a "house DJ," which "frustrated" him. Silver composed the songs on a laptop in trains, buses, airplanes and three apartments. Arranging and sequencing of the songs began after writing of all of them was completed and was done via the digital audio workstation Logic Pro. Due to the complexity of the arrangements as well as the number of effects used on each instrument channel, the DAW often crashed, so Silver had to work on the arrangements in ten-second fragments. In the summer of 2012, the Logic-programmed tracks were taken to Breakglass Studios in Montreal, Quebec and re-recorded.

Outside contains elements of 1980s music by acts such as Peter Gabriel, Phil Collins, Talk Talk, The Blue Nile, and Sting; much of its sound palette is Fairlight CMI samples of instruments such as voices, mallets, and pan flutes. He explained that Gabriel was "trying to express something super organic by using completely inorganic sounds" and that the Fairlight sounds were "so not of this world, but it’s also organic" and "come closer to expressing actual, tangible elements of a forest setting." Pitchfork's Zach Kelly analyzed that Outside differs from the "haze of the translucent pastels" of CFCF's previous records in that it uses "approachable song structures."

Outside features lead vocals from Silver and is the first CFCF album where his singing is the main focus. His performance was described by Kelly as "unspectacular—hushed, a little flat, at times almost plainspoken—but one with a deliberate purpose, used to bring more shape and emotional clarity to these pieces." As Silver explained, Outside starts out very dark in tone, but by the eight track "Transcend," it "rebirth[s]" "quite soft[,] reserved and kind of at peace." The album also features background vocal contributions from Stefanie Franciotti of the project Sleep ∞ Over, Patrick Grossi, known by his stage name as Active Child, and Karl x Johan's Johan Tuvesson. Silver originally planned Japanese group Geinoh Yamashirogumi to perform vocals on "This Breath," but the band refused, and Silver ultimately rewrote the vocal parts he planned for them. On Outside, Franciotti is a background vocalist on what Evelyn Malinowski described as a dark cover of Bonnie 'Prince' Billy's song "Strange Form of Life." Silver though the original song was "quite dark, but with quiet hopefulness" and similar to despaired houses that most neglect to clean. As he explained, "I definitely wanted to kind of amplify these things that the song showed me, and make it kind of grandiose, epic."

== Release and promotion ==
The first track issued from Outside was "Jump Out of the Train," released on August 1, 2013. On September 27, 2013, "Beyond Light" was distributed. An official video for the song was released on October 11, 2013. The video depicts a set of colors, signs and textures that change based on what goes on in the track. The visuals were filmed with a RED Scarlet camera, where the light source and objects were aligned in the same place together. The objects the directors used were chemicals, housewares, and toys taken from a department store. Paper Bag Records and Dummy Records premiered Outside via audio streaming on October 16, 2013. They then issued it to digital stores on October 21 and on vinyl on November 18. On May 20, 2014, Paper Bag distributed Outsiders, a set of four remixes of cuts from Outside as well as two B-sides. On July 24, 2014, an official video for "Strange Form of Life" was released. Directed by Jared Raab, the video depicts of footage of CFCF; the video starts with the camera zooming out of his face before the footage becomes filtered with glitch effects.

== Critical reception ==
Professional ratings
Aggregate scores
Source	Rating
AnyDecentMusic?	5.8/10
Metacritic	67/100
Review scores
Source	Rating
AllMusic	3/5 stars
Clash	4/10
Exclaim!	9/10
Fact	3/5
Mojo	4/5 stars
NME	6/10
Pitchfork	6.7/10
PopMatters	8/10 stars
Q	3/5 stars
Uncut	3/5 stars

Critic Daniel Sylvester honored Outside as CFCF's best release, describing it as "an immaculate zenith that represents every brave, leftfield musical choice this young musician has made up until this point." Kevin Korber of PopMatters called Outside a "masterful collection of songs that is at once self-assured and emotionally direct to the point of fragility." He highlighted the "human" tone of the LP mostly caused by Silver's vocal performance: "He’s not exactly a technically gifted singer, but his plaintive vocals work to greater emphasize the feelings that he’s trying to convey here. Aside from the occasional mis-step [...] Silver’s voice functions well as another ambient texture, flowing seamlessly into the songs and making Outside into an even more impressive accomplishment." He also praised the songwriting that elevated the record to become much "more than ambient background music." Allan Raible of ABC News called the album a "surprising and rewarding collection," recommending it to fans of M83, Air, and Washed Out. Outside ranked number 38 on Gorilla vs. Bear's list of the best albums of 2013.

Kelly praised Silver's ability to change his style while still "sounding uniquely like himself" but found his vocal performance on the record to be "more of a distraction than a guiding light," elaborating that "while a good portion of these songs would sound unfinished without a lyrical component, you can't help but wonder what Outside would sound like with anchored by a different person (or persons) on vox." He also felt that the album would not appeal to listeners who aren't into popular music from the 1980s, explaining that "it's not that Silver doesn't successfully develop [his 1980s pop music elements], but he presents them in ways that are too resolute and self serious to be effectively absorbed." Angus Finlayson's review of the album for Fact magazine mainly discussed its relation to Silver's belief of focusing on the notes composed when listening to music even if it doesn't have a "fashionable" sound. The reviewer opined, "over 53-odd minutes, the utter sincerity of it all begins to feel rather wearisome. Silver may believe in the changeless beauty of his art, but he doesn’t quite succeed in convincing the rest of us." He also criticized the lack of concision in the tracks, which led to "small cracks in Silver’s pop edifice." Dusted magazine critic Patrick Wall called Outside better than Continent in terms of songwriting, atmosphere, feel, and pace but also wrote that it lacked the "insistent hip-hop thump" of CFCF's debut album. He also did not like the fact that Silver "tempered his intellectual curiosity [of his previous EPs] for such outward attempts at adult pop."

Dorian Mendoza, reviewing for Pretty Much Amazing, opined that the album "still showcases one of North America’s more unique and talented producers on his own terms," but also felt that its "formulated" music crafting was at the expense of the "dynamism" that defined previous CFCF records. He also wrote that Silver's singing "adds to the atmosphere, and not to the most effective of results." Journalist Andrew Hannah thought Outside was "more than alright" but was hugely disappointed with its 1980s-influenced ambient synthpop style that replaced the "engaging and energetic" elements of past releases by the producer: " The annoying thing is that we know from previous EPs that CFCF is plainly better than the music on this record, and can only hope he proves it in the future." A review from The Aquarian Weekly praised the "transcendent and dreamlike" instrumentals but described Silver's lead vocals as "almost like a distraction:" "While experimenting is a job requirement of all musicians, CFCF has already found what he does well and should stick with it." Reviewing for AllMusic, Heather Phares stated that the album was "pretty, smooth, and inoffensive, but not nearly as interesting as CFCF's debut album or the EPs that followed it." While he opined Silver's recreation of 1980s sounds to be very faithful, he criticized the songwriting for not being "quite distinctive enough to transcend the atmospheres [Silver] re-creates so exactly" and felt that the album, while not corny, "rarely rises above polished background music." musicOMH opined that while the LP works as an immersive listening experience, it's too focused on mood which, in turn, causes it to have "pedestrian" pacing and unmemorable hooks.

A Mxdown writer described Outside as an album that "simply exists," calling it "tired," "formulaic," "lazy," and "uninspired." Reviewing for In Your Speakers, Ashley Pike criticized Outside for not having enough "broad creativity," writing that its overuse of synthesizers led to a lack of variety between each track. Joe Rivers of Clash magazine wrote that, in trying to resemble a hypnagogic pop album, it "far too often simply passes you by, casts a glance to ‘80s power ballad sincerity and – particularly on the tracks with vocals – sounds like an inferior Tears For Fears." He criticized Silver for "approaching the kind of sounds more associated with artifice than art, and doing so with a completely straight face." Zoe Sheena of The Line of Best Fit was harsh towards Outside; describing it as "an album full of the same musical tropes and devoid of the promising artifices he once displayed," Sheena wrote that it "sounds exactly like the repetitive spinning wheels on a bus (going ’round and ’round) and causes you to become restless and slightly angry of its lack of forward movement." She concluded her review joking, "If you’re looking for something deep and spiritual to accompany a long journey, might we suggest a couple of takeaway glasses from M&S and a copy of some trashy magazine. You’ll probably have more fun."

== Track listing ==
Outside
No.	Title	Length
1.	"Beyond Light"	4:46
2.	"Jump Out Of The Train"	6:36
3.	"Strange Form of Life"	6:43
4.	"Find"	4:09
5.	"This Breath"	4:28
6.	"Feeling Holding"	5:44
7.	"The Forest At Night"	6:18
8.	"Transcend"	3:30
9.	"The Crossing"	5:41
10.	"Walking In The Dust"	4:11
Total length:		52:06

Outsiders
No.	Title	Length
1.	"Jump Out of the Train" (Mark McGuire "Road Chief" remix)	5:00
2.	"Being With You"	6:44
3.	"Forest At Night" (John Roberts remix)	4:08
4.	"Strange Form of Life" (North Americans remix)	5:35
5.	"Transcend" (Huerco S. Temple remix)	6:31
6.	"Windswept"	6:12
Total length:		34:10

== Personnel ==
Derived from the liner notes of Outside.

- Written, performed, produced, recorded, and mixed by Michael Silver at Breakglass Studios in Montreal, Quebec
- Mixed and engineered by James Benjamin
- "Strange Form of Life" is a cover of a song written by Will Oldham
- Background vocals on "Strange Form Of Life" by Stefanie Franciotti
- Background vocals on "Jump Out Of The Train" by Pat Grossi
- Background vocals on "The Crossing" by Johan Tuvesson
- Mastered by Tim Branton at Joao Carvalho Mastering in Toronto, Ontario
- Artwork designed by Colin Bergh
- Artwork cyanotype by Sojourner Truth Parsons

== Release history ==
Region	Date	Format(s)	Label
Worldwide	October 16, 2013	Streaming	Paper Bag; Dummy
Worldwide	October 21, 2013	Digital download	Paper Bag; Dummy
Worldwide	November 18, 2013	Vinyl	Paper Bag; Dummy
Worldwide	May 20, 2014	Digital download — Outsiders	Paper Bag
