= Aya Gloomy =

Japanese pop artist

Aya Gloomy, the stage name of Aya Yanase, is a Japanese pop artist.

== Biography ==
Born in Tokyo, Aya began writing music in junior high school by playing guitar in a band. Her early influences included Björk and MTV as well as electronic indie pop groups such as Glass Candy and Chromatics. She decided to use the moniker of Aya Gloomy after finding the word gloomy in a dictionary; she liked it not only for its phonetic similarity to gummy candies, which she enjoyed, but also because she liked the way its melancholic meaning clashed with the bright and sweet nature of candy.

More recently, she has also cited Japanese avant-pop artists from the 1980s such as Jun Togawa and Dip in the Pool as influences for her debut album.

== Discography ==
=== Albums ===
- 陸の孤島 (Big Love Records, 2018)
- Tokyo Hakai (Self-released, 2021)

=== Singles and EPs ===
- Only You (Self-released, 2015)
- Ennui Ground (STBO Recordings, Big Love Records, 2017)
- Kanjiru (Self-released, 2019)
