= On Vacation (CFCF album) =

Album by CFCF

Studio album (mini-LP) by CFCF
- Released: February 17, 2016
- Recorded: 2014–15
- Studio: Michael Silver's home, Montreal
- Genre: Balearic beat; ambient; jazz; baroque; chamber music; downtempo; easy listening; exotica; new age
- Length: 31:05
- Label: International Feel
- Producer: CFCF

CFCF chronology
"The Colours of Life" (2015)	On Vacation (2016)	On Vacation Remixes (2016)

Singles from On Vacation
- 1. "Sate Padang" Released: January 12, 2016; 2. "Arto" Released: January 12, 2016

On Vacation is a mini-album by Canadian electronic musician Michael Silver, known by his stage name as CFCF, and the second record in Balearic beat music label International Feel's On Vacation mini-album series. On Vacation was initially planned to be a project of two extended plays titled Road Movie and House Music; this was before an International Feel A&R worker suggested to Silver he should make the project one whole album. International Feel first released vinyl versions of the LP in Europe on February 17, 2016, before releasing it in digital shops all around the world on February 19.

A Balearic beat jazz record that also includes a variety of musical styles such as baroque, chamber music, downtempo, easy listening, and new age, it is a set of tracks that lack any sort of indication of what place they are specifically set in, which is unlike most Balearic music that usually takes place on a beach. Reviews of On Vacation from music journalists were very favorable in general, some of them calling the record a "masterpiece" and one of the best albums of all time; a common praise was the album's use of sounds that would otherwise turn off most contemporary listeners. A set of three remixes of songs from On Vacation was issued by International Feel on July 15, 2016.

== Composition ==
On Vacation is a "breezy and cinematic" LP with "elegant melodies," as described by Alec M. Preister of The New York Times. The record contains a variety of different genres; with Silver himself categorizing it as an ECM Records-style jazz release, it also touches on balearic beat, ambient, baroque, chamber music, downtempo, easy listening, exotica, J-pop, new age, and what critic Thomas H. Green described as "Parisian café music." While it contains the same elements of the works of 1980s acts like Peter Gabriel, Dip in the Pool, and David Sylvian that were in all of CFCF's previous albums, including light-sounding drum machines, fretless bass and new age synthesizers, it includes much more acoustic instrumentation than his past releases, such as woodwinds, pianos, saxophones, chime sounds and accordions. The more ambient tracks on On Vacation include "Lighthouse on Chatham Sound," which contains a brief interlude of a woodwind-and-chime arrangement in the style of Brian Wilson's album Smile (2004), and “In The Courtyard.”

The songs on On Vacation were inspired by the films Paris, Texas (1984) and Three Colors: Red (1994). Resident Advisor critic Andrew Ryce wrote that On Vacation has a similar intention to Paris, Texas in that it "invites you to get lost in its incredible backdrops." Ryce wrote that "even the rhythmic parts can feel motionless, with metronomic beats that induce contemplation more than movement." On Vacation, as a reviewer for International DJ magazine analyzed, is "an album inspired by places and spaces - some imaginary, some real." As journalist Paul Simpson wrote, "On Vacation isn't CFCF's most focused work, but it isn't supposed to be. As the title states, this is music for escaping day-to-day life and getting pleasantly lost."

Critic Daniel Bromfield called On Vacation superior from most Balearic releases due to its "sense of mystery;" the songs lack any specific or consistent indication of where they take place, unlike other Balearic recordings which are commonly set in beaches of places like Africa or Brazil. For example, "Arto," as Bromfield wrote, "will scan as European to anyone who’s never seen a Hayao Miyazaki film, but to those who have, it will instantly evoke the work of his musical partner, Joe Hisaishi, particularly on their more nostalgic joints like Porco Rosso and Kiki's Delivery Service." Other specimens of the LP's little-place-identity aspect are songs whose titles are contradictory to where they are really set, including “Vermont,” which has the vibe of coasts rather than wood-filled areas like the U.S. state named in the track's title, and “Sate Padang," which consists of more of an Afrobeat feel than an Indonesian tone. Bromfield also wrote that some songs, such as “Lighthouse On Chatham Sound,” “Chasing,” and “In The Courtyard” have a high amount of reverb on instruments "for extra transportive oomph."

== Release ==
On Vacation was originally planned to be released as two extended plays titled Road Movie and House Music. However, International Feel A&R worker Paul Byrne, known by his stage name as Apiento, convinced Silver he should combine the tracks into one single record instead of two separate releases; thus, the songs were released as a mini-album titled On Vacation, the second album in International Feel's On Vacation mini-LP series. On January 12, 2016, two songs from On Vacation, "Sate Padang" and "Arto," premiered on Gorilla vs. Bear, "Sate Padang" co-premiering via The Fader. International Feel first issued On Vacation in European stores on February 17, 2016. The album was then released in digital stores worldwide on February 19, 2016.

== Critical reception ==
Professional ratings
Aggregate scores
Source	Rating
Metacritic	75/100
Review scores
Source	Rating
Allmusic	3.5/5 stars
Exclaim!	6/10
International DJ	10/10
Pitchfork	7.8/10
Resident Advisor	3.9/5
Spectrum Culture	4/5 stars

Bromfield, reviewing for Spectrum Culture, wrote that with On Vacation, Silver proved he was the "closest thing Balearic ha[d] to a modern great." He called the mini-album "something rare: a work that refuses to make itself more likable or palatable to compromise its vision." He praised Silver for taking a risk in making a style of music free from any sort of negativity or dark tone that would normally be considered "corny" and "wimpy" by most listeners; Bromfield wrote that Silver succeeded in making a pastiche of "corny" music everyone could enjoy in that Silver "came in with something very clear in his mind – perhaps a melody, or a place he wanted to evoke – and then used the best of his talents to make it spring to life." He also praised the LP's songs as different from most Balearic music for their lack of indication of places they represent, because "it allows listeners to create their own mental slideshows [and] avoids the tendency of exotica to construct phony, patronizing ideas of foreign music." However, he also gave minor criticisms like the short length of the record, the "stylistic discrepancies" between each song that gave the album an "awkward" arc, and the lack of a "consistent mood." A praise similar to that in Bromfield's review came from Philip Sherburne. As he concluded in his review for Pitchfork, "it is Silver's most sophisticated virtual environment yet; disappear into it for a while, and you may come back with a newfound appreciation for sounds you once thought irredeemable—yes, even slap bass." A review from Beatselector magazine concluded with, "Silver has rescued some of the sounds previously considered abominable to current music. He sucks his audience into an experience. And he does it well. This may be one of his most sophisticated albums yet."

A writer for International DJ magazine, scoring On Vacation a perfect ten, called the LP one of the best albums ever made. The writer praised Silver's "keen sense of melody" on the LP where it "allows CFCF to switch genres throughout this release and shows him in clear analogue organic territory." Thump journalist Josh Baines honored it as a "10/10, stone cold, grade-A masterpiece, and an utterly essential listen for anyone with even the slightest interest in music that sort of sounds like being in a garden centre on the best pill of your life." Green called it a "thoughtful" record, highlighting its "delicious, warm production," while Ryce called it "personal and awe-inspiring." Simpson, writing for Allmusic, said that "there's certainly a great deal of care put into these subtly sophisticated tracks, with slightly twisted rhythms and arrangements, and ecstatic moments." In a more mixed review for Exclaim!, Pearson called On Vacation a "loving recreation" of new age music from the 1980s and 1990s, praising its "expertly sourced sound-bank." However, he also wrote that it has "little more than ambience and mood," and "those looking for a bolder artistic statement may be disappointed by its conventionality." On Vacation landed at number 44 on Gorilla vs. Bear's list of the best albums of 2016.

== Track listing ==
Track lengths from the iTunes Store.

No.	Title	Length
1.	"Sate Padang"	3:58
2.	"Arto"	3:06
3.	"In the Courtyard"	2:01
4.	"Pleasure Centre"	5:47
5.	"Chasing"	2:18
6.	"Fleurs Laissés Dans Un Taxi"	4:42
7.	"Lighthouse on Chatham Sound"	4:25
8.	"Vermont"	4:48
Total length:		31:05

== Personnel ==
Credits adapted from the liner notes of On Vacation.

- All tracks written, performed and recorded by Michael Silver at his home studio in Montreal from 2014 to 2015
- Accordion on "Arto" and "Chasing" by Nigel Broderick
- Cello on "In The Courtyard" by Keith Freund

== Release history ==
Region	Date	Format(s)	Label
Europe	February 17, 2016	Vinyl	International Feel
Worldwide	February 19, 2016	Digital download	International Feel

== On Vacation Remixes ==
On Vacation Remixes

EP by CFCF
- Released: July 15, 2016
- Recorded: 2014–15
- Length: 13:42
- Label: International Feel
- Producer: CFCF; Alejandro Cohen; Andres Renteria; Sam Cooper; Stellar Rahim; Apiento

CFCF chronology
On Vacation (2016)	On Vacation Remixes (2016)	Cascades (2017)

A set of three remixes of tracks from On Vacation were released on July 15, 2016, under an extended play titled On Vacation Remixes: a remix of "Pleasure Centre" by Los Angeles group Pharaohs, CFCF's "Re-Version" of "Fleurs Laissés Dans Un Taxi," and Apiento's reedit of "Chasing." Pharaohs' re-edit of "Pleasure Centre" adds a set of hand percussion and flute riffs to the original song. CFCF's "Fleurs Laissés Dans Un Taxi" remix extends the original song's guitar and adds a saxophone and drum machine to its instrumentation. Apiento's remix of "Chasing" only makes few alterations to the source material, including adding filters to the accordion and adding a guitar part. Andy Beta wrote a mixed review of the EP for Resident Advisor; he felt that the remixes of "Chasing" and "Fleurs Laissés Dans Un Taxi" were underwhelming "musical wallpaper," writing that the "Pleasure Centre" re-cut was the only track on the EP with "some sort of pulse."

=== Track listing ===
Track lengths from the iTunes Store.

No.	Title	Remix by	Length
1.	"Pleasure Centre"	Pharaohs	5:01
2.	"Fleurs Laissés Dans Un Taxi"	CFCF	5:15
3.	"Chasing"	Apiento	3:26
Total length:			13:42

=== Release history ===
Region	Date	Format(s)	Label
Worldwide	July 15, 2016	Digital download; vinyl	International Feel
