= CFCF (musician) =

Canadian electronic musician/vocalist

- Born: Michael Silver; Montreal, Quebec, Canada
- Genres: Electronic
- Occupations: Musician, composer, arranger
- Labels: Paper Bag Records; Acéphale Records; RVNG Intl.; International Feel; BGM Solutions
- Website: https://www.cfcfmusic.com/

CFCF is the stage name of Canadian electronic musician Michael "Mike" Silver. Based in Montreal, Silver took the name CFCF from the call sign of the city's CFCF-TV. Silver's work oftentimes involves themes of nostalgia.

Silver has released ten studio albums, a film soundtrack, and several EPs. In 2015, he released two albums within two weeks: Radiance and Submission on July 31, and The Colours of Life on August 14. His most recent release is the studio album L.U.V. (2026).

== Background ==
Originally from Montreal, Silver became interested in electronic music at an early age. Self-taught, he cites Peter Gabriel, DJ Shadow, Yellow Magic Orchestra, and Talk Talk as important influences.

== Career ==
His first 7" single "You Hear Colours" / "Invitation to Love" was released on March 8, 2009, on the Acéphale label.

Describing his creative approach on 2012's Exercises and 2013's Music for Objects, Silver says, "A lot of people think the things that will give your life meaning are those grand, giant emotions, like you're terrified, or you're in love, but what the EPs are trying to do is fill in the gaps between."

In 2013, Silver released his second studio album, titled Outside. Inspirations for the album include The Letting Go by Bonnie "Prince" Billy (Outside also features a cover of that album's second track, "Strange Form of Life"), Notebook on Cities and Clothes by Wim Wenders, and Peter Gabriel.

In 2016, Silver was nominated for the Grammy Award for Best Remixed Recording, Non-Classical for his remix of "Berlin By Overnight" by Daniel Hope.

Silver composed the score for the 2022 film You Can Live Forever.

== Style ==
In a 2013 interview with Aimee Cliff for DMY, Silver calls his own melodies "evocative rather than provocative." Cliff goes on to write that Silver's melodies are "never close enough to divulge anything personal, but they aren't devoid of humanity either. Maybe this is because they aren't studies as much as they are reflections."

== Discography ==
Studio albums
- 2009 – Continent, Paper Bag Records
- 2013 – Outside, Paper Bag Records
- 2015 – Radiance and Submission, Driftless Recordings
- 2015 – The Colours of Life, 1080p Collection
- 2016 – On Vacation, International Feel
- 2019 – Liquid Colours, BGM Solutions
- 2021 – Memoryland, BGM Solutions
- 2026 – L.U.V., CFCF

Mixtapes

- 2010 – Slow R&B for Zellers Locations Canada-Wide
- 2010 – Do U Like Night Bus
- 2010 – Altered Zones 4
- 2011 – Reincarnation
- 2011 – Slorida
- 2011 – Night Bus II
- 2012 – The Flood for SSENSE
- 2014 – Night Bus 3: Death of Night Bus
- 2015 – Blowing Up The Workshop 48
- 2019 – Night Bus 4: Memory of Night Bus
- 2020 – MMLD 99.9 FM: Dispatches From Memoryland

EPs

- 2009 – Panesian Nights, Paper Bag Records
- 2010 – Drifts, Paper Bag Records
- 2010 – CFCF c28, They Live We Sleep
- 2010 – The River, RVNG Intl.
- 2012 – Exercises, Paper Bag Records / Dummy
- 2013 – Music for Objects, Paper Bag Records / Dummy
- 2017 – Cascades (with Jean-Michel Blais), Arts & Crafts
- 2018 – Self Service, Sounds of Beaubien Ouest

Singles

- 2009 – "The Explorers", Paper Bag Records
- 2009 – "You Hear Colours" / "Invitation to Love", Acephale Records
- 2011 – "Cometrue", UNO NYC
- 2018 – "December 25, 1999", BGM Solutions
- 2021 – "Light Disguise", Collection Disques Durs
- 2022 – "Sunrise Blue", BGM Solutions
- 2023 – "Never Going Home", BGM Solutions

=== Remixes ===
- 2008 – Heartsrevolution – "CYOA (CFCF Remix)"
- 2008 – The Presets – "Talk Like That (CFCF Remix)"
- 2008 – HEALTH – "Triceratops (CFCF Remix)"
- 2008 – Sally Shapiro – "Time to Let Go (CFCF Remix)"
- 2008 – Crystal Castles – "Air War (CFCF Remix)"
- 2008 – Genghis Tron – "Recursion (CFCF Remix)"
- 2008 – Memory Cassette – "Last One Awake (CFCF Version)"
- 2009 – Sally Shapiro – "Love in July (CFCF Remix)"
- 2009 – Datarock – "The Pretender (CFCF Remix)"
- 2009 – Fan Death – "The Constellations (CFCF Remix)"
- 2009 – Midstates and The Choir of Ghosts – "Hate to See You Smile (CFCF Remix)"
- 2009 – Woodhands – "Dancer (CFCF Remix)"
- 2010 – Owen Pallett – "Lewis Takes off His Shirt (CFCF Remix)"
- 2010 – Azari & III – "Into the Night (CFCF Remix)"
- 2010 – Historics – "Take It to the Top (CFCF Remix)"
- 2010 – HEALTH – "Before Tigers (CFCF Remix)"
- 2012 – Say Lou Lou – "Maybe You (CFCF Remix)"
- 2012 – Elite Gymnastics – "Here, in Heaven 4 & 5 (CFCF Remix)"
- 2017 – Kero Kero Bonito – "Heard a Song (CFCF Remix)"
- 2017 – HEALTH – "Dark Enough (CFCF Remix)"
- 2018 – Baltra – "Will You Be? (CFCF Remix)"
- 2022 – The Hellp – "yrstruly (CFCF Remix)"
- 2023 – The Life – "Grace (CFCF Remix)"
- 2024 – Basile3 – "U Stole the Summer (CFCF Remix)"
