= The River (EP) =

EP by CFCF
- Released: October 12, 2010October 12, 2010
- Recorded: Fall 2009–winter 2010
- Studio: Silver's home and various trains
- Genre: New age; electronic; downtempo; experimental; psychedelic; ambient; kosmische
- Length: 32:27
- Label: RVNG Intl.
- Producer: CFCF

CFCF chronology
CFCF c28 (2010)	The River (2010)	Exercises (2012)

Singles from The River
- 1. "Before and After Light" Released: September 28, 2010; 2. "It Was Never Meant to Be This Way (Games Remix)" Released: October 11, 2010

The River is an extended play written and produced from 2009 to 2010 by Canadian electronic musician Michael Silver, known by his stage name as CFCF. It was inspired by Werner Herzog's 1982 film Fitzcarraldo. Described by RVNG Intl.'s press release as a series of "lucid sound sequences from a lunatic mind," the experimental downtempo psychedelic new age EP was analyzed by music journalist Jonny Coleman as the story of a character who is stranded in a rural, tribal land. The River is a set of six original tracks by Silver with digital download versions of the record containing four remixes of songs from the EP by acts such as Jacques Renault, Coyote, and Games. The River was released by label RVNG Intl. on October 12, 2010, to generally positive reviews from critics, some reviewers calling its more modern-sounding cuts to be the best of the entire record.

== Composition and concept ==
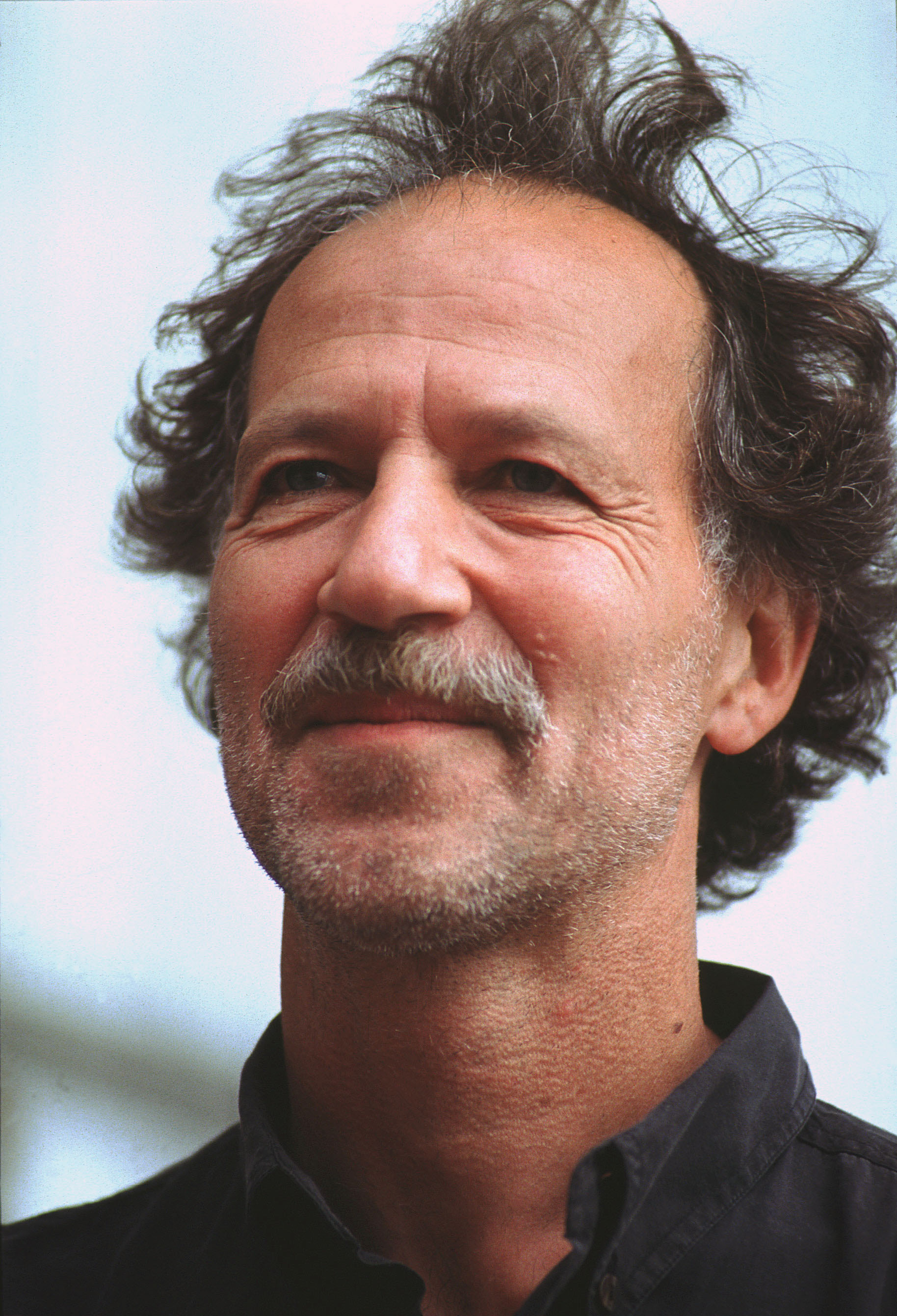
The River was inspired by Fitzcarraldo (1982), a film by Werner Herzog.

The River was written and produced from the fall of 2009 to the winter of 2010 by Michael Silver at his home and "on trains." It was inspired by Fitzcarraldo (1982), a German adventure-drama film by Werner Herzog that, in the words of writer Jonny Coleman, is about "academic (white) men who go out on culturally touristic crusades." Coleman highlighted that these "academic (white) men" formed the presence of Imperialism in the world due to their crusades. He analyzes that The River follows a character who is stranded in a rural, tribal land, where "benevolent polyrhythms share space with civilized instruments like synths and drum machines." The vinyl cover of The River, designed by Kevin O’Neill, is a map of what led the title character of Herzog's film to achieve "madness and freedom."

The press release by RVNG Intl. summarized The River as a series of "lucid sound sequences from a lunatic mind." The EP is an experimental downtempo electronic psychedelic new age record that was categorized by William Rauscher of Resident Advisor as a "heavily soundtrack-esque exploration of kosmische atmosphere and ambient evocation." It mostly consists of textures that sound like they were made with acoustic instruments. Ray Finlayson of Beats Per Minute described the sound of The River as a "beautiful landscape."

== Songs ==
The River begins with "Before and After Light," a song based around a looping snippet of finger-picking. The song also consists of unnoticeable drums and ghost-like, Brian Eno-style synthesizers. The track is followed by "It Was Never Meant to Be This Way," which features the more repetitive aspects of krautrock. It depicts what RVNG Intl. described as a "melancholy chopstick piano figure" in an environment of ghostly-and-airy-sounding synthesizer loops. Coleman wrote that the first two songs serve as an introduction to the tribal land that the EP takes place in, as they "casually build towards something" and "noodle and meander without any vocals leading the charge."

Coleman analyzes that a human voice is introduced on The River in "Upon the Hill" in the form of an "abstract backing vocal choir." The track consists of Popol Vuh-style electric guitars that, as he wrote, give both a "vaguely spiritual" and "dusty-leather-rock-friendly" groove to the track. Snare drums come in later on in the track to "scream[] at us that we’re marching somewhere," he analyzed. Coleman pinpoints "Frozen Forest" as the MacGuffin in the plot of The River. The ambient downtempo trip-hop song was analogized by Finlayson as someone driving through the woods after a snowstorm, which is represented using what he labeled as "chilly synths and glimmering repeating noises" that play over a set breakbeat-style drums and bass arpeggios. Finlayson compared its "cold feeling" to the works of Fever Ray, while Rauscher found its vibe and guitar pick sounds similar to "Teardrop" by English group Massive Attack.

The title track, categorized by Rauscher as a "Tim-Hecker style white-noise freak-out," includes synthesized panpipes and sounds similar to those of a heavy amount of water harshly flowing. As the press release described, the title track "casts doomsday shadows before the best use of a master blaster drum attack since DJ Shadow’s "Stem / Long Stem"." The River closes with "Orage," which, as the press release analogized, "drifts on a bed of wreckage into an uncertain dusk." As Finlayson wrote, the song is a "vague nod to times and sounds past as wonderfully resolving synth lines circle patiently around each other." Despite these synth lines being electronically produced, Finlayson noted their "strangely natural" feel, "like some sort of high pitch noise a thriving forest emits condensed into carefully executed tones." The track ends with rain sound effects as it fades out. As Coleman wrote, "the final two tracks wind us down either the way we came or as some sort of conduit, some bridge to the next release."

== Remixes ==
Digital download editions of The River come with four remixes of songs from the EP. These re-edits were analogized by Rauscher as "the soundtrack to Fitzcarraldo 2: Electric Boogaloo, in which the obsessed hero builds a disco next to his jungle opera house." The first of these remixes is a version of "Frozen Forest" by DJ Jacques Renault, which Coleman called a "bridge track, one that constantly inches us higher, without exploding." The remix removes the guitar from the original track and turns it into a dub-influenced house song. It is followed by a remix of "It Was Never Meant to Be This Way" by electronic music duo Games, which was described by reviewer Steve Shaw as a "lush affair" with "chopped DX7 pads and afro-new age staccato melodies". The remix was also included on Games' EP That We Can Play (2010). Another remix of "Frozen Forest" by English balearic group Coyote adds a disco element to the original song and is much more melodic. The last remix of the digital edition of The River is a piano version of "It Was Never Meant to Be This Way," which The Fader analogized as the story of a "damper-pedal virtuoso and plaintive high-cheekboned ghost [that] take[s] residence inside your ear to elegantly discharge their story of composure amidst agitating stillness."

== Release and promotion ==
Two tracks from The River were released before the EP was distributed: "Before and After Light" on September 28, 2010 and Games' remix of "It Was Never Meant to Be This Way" on October 11, 2010. The River was released on vinyl and in digital stores on October 12, 2010, by the label RVNG Intl. The first vinyl pressing of The River was a limited edition of 550 copies. On October 6, 2010, an official video for the title track was released. Described by Larry Fitzmaurice as a "strangely unsettling clip," the video depicts a woman with anxiety on a roller coaster, kids disappearing, and a man that walks backward. On November 8, 2010, a video for the piano version of "It Was Never Meant to be This Way" was released. It uses footage of the "icebox glamor" sequences from the David Cronenberg film Stereo (1969).

== Reception ==
Professional ratings
Review scores
Source	Rating
Beats Per Minute	79%
Fact	3.5/5
Pitchfork	6.8/10
Resident Advisor	3.5/5
Under the Radar	6/10 stars

Finlayson called The River "fresh," "original," and "exciting." Both Rauscher and Pitchfork critic Marc Hogan found the more modern-sounding material on the EP to be the best on the release. Rauscher still found its more retro-sounding tracks to be "quite effective," while Hogan felt that they "tend to drag." Hogan called The River "fine and auspicious" but also opined it a downfall from the film the EP was inspired by in that the listener "can't hear the place" where it takes place like the film. A writer from Under the Radar concluded, "while The River lacks an immediate standout close to Continent's "Big Love," it still strikes an incredible aesthetic balance between Silver's love affair with 1980s keyboard music and his forward-thinking, restrained, and sparse electronica know-how."

In a more mixed review, Danny Wadeson of The Line of Best Fit dismissed The River as "an oddly composed EP [...] that flirts with great ideas and a lush sound that aren’t quite unlocked fully until they find themselves in other hands than those of Silver’s." He criticized the EP for having remixes that "actually help to find the original tracks find what feels like a truer voice," feeling the original CFCF tracks lacked "engaging beats." The cover art for The River landed on a year-end list of the "Top 25 Album Covers of 2010" by Tiny Mix Tapes.

== Track listing ==
All track lengths adapted from the iTunes Stores.

No.	Title	Length
1.	"Before and After Light"	5:19
2.	"It Was Never Meant to Be This Way"	5:13
3.	"Upon the Hill"	5:10
4.	"Frozen Forest"	5:47
5.	"The River"	6:36
6.	"Orage"	4:22
Total length:		32:27

Digital download bonus remixes
No.	Title	Length
7.	"Frozen Forest" (Jacques Renault remix)	7:56
8.	"It Was Never Meant to Be This Way" (Games remix)	3:18
9.	"Frozen Forest" (Coyote remix)	7:52
10.	"It Was Never Meant to Be This Way" (Piano version)	4:12
Total length:		55:45
