= Loudmouth (band) =

American post-grunge band

Loudmouth is a post-grunge band, formed in 1993. Their songs included "Fly", "What?", and "End of the Century". Their music was featured in the PlayStation game Omega Boost, and having the same song featured in the movie Varsity Blues.

Two of Loudmouth's four members are Bob Feddersen and John Sullivan who were both from Oak Lawn, Illinois. Feddersen and Sullivan were previously in the bands Vandal and Full Force. They have been musical partners since they were in junior high, both recently have pursued solo careers. Loudmouth's former bassist, Mike "Flare" Flaherty went on to enjoy limited success with the band No One. Lead Guitarist Tony "Mac" McQuaid has been playing Guitar in two Illinois-based Rock Bands, one named Head on and the other named The Mag 7.

LoudMouth released their first CD on Hollywood Records in 1999. It featured the single "Fly" and "Rats in the Maze". John Sullivan and Joe Barresi produced the album that was mixed by Chris Lord-Alge.

== Discography ==
- 1/2 EP (5 songs, 1995, Moot Music)
- Loudmouth (8 songs, 1997, Moot Music)
- Loudmouth (Major label debut, 1999, Hollywood Records)
  - Track listing:
1. "Fly"
2. "No Heroes"
3. "Not Free"
4. "Maybe"
5. "Rats in the Maze"
6. "Road"
7. "Turn It Off"
8. "Lucky 7"
9. "Where Have We Gone"
10. "Insecure"
11. "What?"
12. "End of the Century"
