= Omega Boost =

1999 video game

- Developer: Polyphony Digital (Note: Additional work by Cyberhead)
- Publisher: Sony Computer Entertainment
- Directors: Yasushi Taki; Zaika Tei
- Producer: Kazunori Yamauchi
- Designer: Yuji Yasuhara
- Programmer: Yuji Yasuhara
- Artists: Hiroshi Kanzaki; Hiroshi Takeuchi; Shoji Kawamori
- Composer: Jun Kitagawa
- Platform: PlayStation
- Release: JP: April 22, 1999; WW: September 14, 1999
- Genre: Rail shooter
- Mode: Single player

Omega Boost (Note: Japanese: オメガブースト, Hepburn: Omega Būsuto) is a 1999 shoot 'em up video game developed by Polyphony Digital and published by Sony Computer Entertainment for the PlayStation. It is the first game to be developed by Polyphony Digital, formed after the success of Gran Turismo which was developed under Sony Computer Entertainment Japan, and their only game that is not in the Gran Turismo series as well as their sole non-racing video game.

The game features mecha designs by Shoji Kawamori of Macross fame. The game was criticized by some reviewers for being too short (nine levels with an equal amount of unlockable special missions) and simplistic.

== Gameplay ==
Gameplay screenshot

The gameplay takes place in waves, meaning that enemies will appear in the same groups and formations in the same order every playthrough. The player doesn't get to choose what order to engage an entire stage's enemies, just the ones in the current wave. This rail-shooter element does not hamper the player's freedom to fly where they choose in most stages. On some stages, the player has complete control of Omega Boost, specifically areas where they are in Planet ETA's atmosphere. Other stages limit the player in terms of speed (falling through the timeshift).

The "Boost" part of the mech's name comes from Omega Boost's booster pack, allowing the player to move in any direction and circle strafe enemies with a scanning and lock-on feature. Omega Boost also learns the Viper Boost maneuver once it is levelled up. Viper Boost, when engaged, will cause Omega Boost to glow blue as it tears through enemies on screen. Destroying enemies will cause the gauge to refill incrementally. However, the game can be completed without ever using Viper Boost. If Viper Boost is used, the final ranking will have "Pixy" added onto the title, showing the attack during play.

== Story ==
In the past, an artificial intelligence named AlphaCore peacefully and silently co-existed with the human race, though its origins remain unknown. Eventually, the human race advanced to the point where they became aware of AlphaCore and its capabilities, and were shocked by what it was capable of. Fearing its power, humanity tried to 'dump' AlphaCore- presumably an attempt to destroy or manipulate the AI- but the action failed, only provoking the AlphaCore and starting a war between humans and machines. This war goes on into the distant future, with mankind steadily being outmatched by AlphaCore, who is capable of destroying entire cities easily.

In this future, scientists devise a way to travel through time in order stop AlphaCore. However, AlphaCore discovers this plan and steals the time travel technology. It builds a giant shaft, the Timeshaft, on a desolate, mined out planet named ETA, and uses this to travel back in time and alter ENIAC, the first general-use computer created and considered by AlphaCore to be the first artificial intelligence. It plans to implant a virus containing its own code into one of ENIAC's vacuum tubes, thus creating a predestination paradox and ensuring its survival in the present day.

To counter AlphaCore's scheme, human scientists create the Omega Boost, a giant robot capable of traveling through time using the Direct Drive System (DDS). Lester J. Hemming, an experienced pilot and one of very few who can pilot the Omega Boost, is charged with traveling back in time to stop AlphaCore by finding ENIAC and replacing the AlphaCore infected vacuum tube, breaking the paradox and thus stopping AlphaCore before it even has a chance to exist.

Omega Boost manages to pierce the defenses around planet ETA, encountering along the way a red 'knockoff' of Omega Boost made by AlphaCore named Beta Boost, and enters the Timeshaft encountering resistance around and inside. However, after traveling through, Lester and Omega Boost find themselves not in the past of 1946, but near planet ETA a few decades into the future.

The ETA of the future has become the home base of AlphaCore and turned into a cybernetic planet completely unlike its present self, overrun with AlphaCore's machinery. Omega Boost proceeds to breach the planetary defenses, once again defeating Beta Boost (who has been given a version of the Viper Boost attack) and fending off the avatar of AlphaCore itself.

Afterwards, AlphaCore detonates the entire planet in an effort to destroy Omega Boost, but leaves the Timeshaft- now its own structure akin to a space station- intact in order to attempt an escape to an unknown time. Omega Boost pursues it and destroys its three forms- crystal, serpent-like machine, and finally the true form, a vaguely fairylike humanoid with wings. After defeat, AlphaCore attempts to possess Omega Boost, but fails, disintegrating.

The end cutscene depicts Omega Boost arriving in 1946, crashing into a forest in North America. Lester locates ENIAC and, through a small probe, finds the vacuum tube infected by AlphaCore's virus, switching it out for the safe tube seen in the intro; thus preventing AlphaCore's rise to power and subsequent destruction of the human race.

== Development ==
Similarities between Omega Boost and Sega's Panzer Dragoon series led to a rumor that former members of Team Andromeda, dissolved in 1998, had joined Polyphony Digital. This rumor turned out to be true as the lead designer and programmer on Omega Boost was Yuji Yasuhara, who had worked on Panzer Dragoon Zwei.

== Audio ==
Omega Boost Original Soundtrack

Soundtrack album by CMJK, Shingo Okumura, Daiki Kasho, Takafumi Fujisawa
- Released: June 19, 1999
- Genre: Video game soundtrack
- Length: 63:21
- Label: SPE Visual Works

The Omega Boost Original Soundtrack was released on June 19, 1999.

Omega Boost Original Soundtrack
No.	Title	Writer(s)	Length
1.	"BOOST I"	Takafumi Fujisawa	0:20
2.	"SPLIT THE NEBULA"	CMJK	5:18
3.	"RING BUFFER"	CMJK	3:28
4.	"ORBITAL FLIGHT"	CMJK	4:23
5.	"BETA BETA"	CMJK	3:11
6.	"ATTACK IN WAVES"	CMJK	4:49
7.	"GROUND AND THE SKY"	CMJK	3:26
8.	"THE ODD LIFE FORCE"	CMJK	4:35
9.	"A MEASURING WORM"	CMJK	3:05
10.	"BACK TO THE 1946"	CMJK	4:43
11.	"SPARK OF DRUM"	CMJK	1:31
12.	"TENSE UP"	Singo Okumura, Daiki Kasho	2:07
13.	"PATHAKA"	CMJK	1:33
14.	"BOOST II"	Takafumi Fujisawa	0:14
15.	"FIERCE RESISTANCE"	CMJK	4:44
16.	"ELIMINATION UP"	CMJK	4:51
17.	"LET'S TIE LIKE A LINE"	CMJK	4:49
18.	"Ismeel"	Dip in the Pool	6:14

The album had a limited print and is considered very rare. As such, many fans of the game have found it easier to rip the soundtrack from the game disc itself, however, this leads to confusion over the official titles of the tracks, mainly because they are labeled as "areas" in-game instead of the official names given by the creators.

The opening movie and ending credits in each version features different music. The Japanese version uses "Shade" by Feeder as its opening theme and final boss theme, and "Ismeel" by Dip in the Pool as its ending theme. The North American version licenses songs by Loudmouth, opening with "Fly" and closing with "The Road"; as well as featuring "Otsegolation" by Static-X, played during the title screen and the final boss. Finally, the European version uses "Dreamer" by Cast as the opening, final boss and ending themes.

== Merchandise ==
A series of action figures was created by Blue Box Toys, featuring mecha from the game, including: Omega Boost and Beta Boost. A third figure, Herbarcher, was shown on the back of the boxes; however, it was never released.

== Reception ==
Reception

Aggregate score
Aggregator	Score
GameRankings	73%

Review scores
Publication	Score
AllGame	3/5
CNET Gamecenter	6/10
Edge	7/10
Electronic Gaming Monthly	8.875/10
Famitsu	28/40
Game Informer	7.75/10
GameFan	79% (Note: In GameFan's viewpoint of the Japanese import, three critics gave it each a score of 83, 75, and 79.) (E.M.) 60%
GamePro	(DPD) 4/5 (Note: GamePro gave the game two 4/5 scores for graphics and overall fun factor, and two 4.5/5 scores for sound and control in one review.) (A.D.) 3.5/5 (Note: GamePro gave the game three 4/5 scores for graphics, sound, and control, and 3.5/5 for overall fun factor in another review.)
GameRevolution	C+
GameSpot	6.5/10
IGN	6.3/10
Next Generation	2/5
Official U.S. PlayStation Magazine	4/5

Omega Boost received above-average reviews according to the review aggregation website GameRankings. However, Chris Charla of NextGen called it "The textbook definition of a two-star game: competent, but totally uninspired." In Japan, Famitsu gave it a better score of 28 out of 40.
