= Exercises (EP) =

EP by CFCF
- Released: April 12, 2012
- Recorded: 2011
- Studios: Michael Silver's home in Montreal, Paris, and GS Mastering & Post in Stockholm
- Genres: Modern classical; ambient; minimal; indie; synth-pop; progressive electronica; new age
- Length: 26:29
- Labels: Paper Bag; Dummy
- Producer: CFCF

CFCF chronology
The River (2010)	Exercises (2012)	Music for Objects (2013)

Singles from The River
- 1. "Exercise #3 (Building)" Released: February 2, 2012; 2. "Exercise #5 (September)" Released: April 6, 2012

Exercises is the fifth extended play in the discography of Canadian musician Michael Silver, known by his stage name as CFCF. The extended play was inspired by brutalist architecture and several synthesizer-heavy modern classical and piano-only works that Silver listened to during the fall and winter of 2010–11, which were the "soundtrack" to how he felt "kind of uncertain” in those seasons. Its cover art by Ken Schwarz, Josh Clancy, and Travis Stearns shows one of the buildings the extended play was inspired by.

Exercises was produced with very limited resources; the piano was not an actual live piano but rather a replication from a software instrument plug-in. Each cut on Exercises is a minimal track that involves a piano that slowly builds around other sounds like quiet drums and synthesizers. It follows a more classical and less dance music-based style with more "simple" compositions than his past releases. The EP features a "semi-cover" of "September," a track by English singer-songwriter David Sylvian.

Promoted with two pre-EP track releases and a music video, Exercises was in released in 2012 by the labels Paper Bag Records and Dummy Records. It garnered generally very favorable reviews upon its distribution, ranking number 14 on a list of the best dance and electronic releases of 2012 by Exclaim!. Some reviewers highlighted the expansion of Silver's musical scope with the EP, while critics with more mixed opinions on the record felt it sounded too nice and lacked in having surprising or exciting moments.

== Inspiration ==
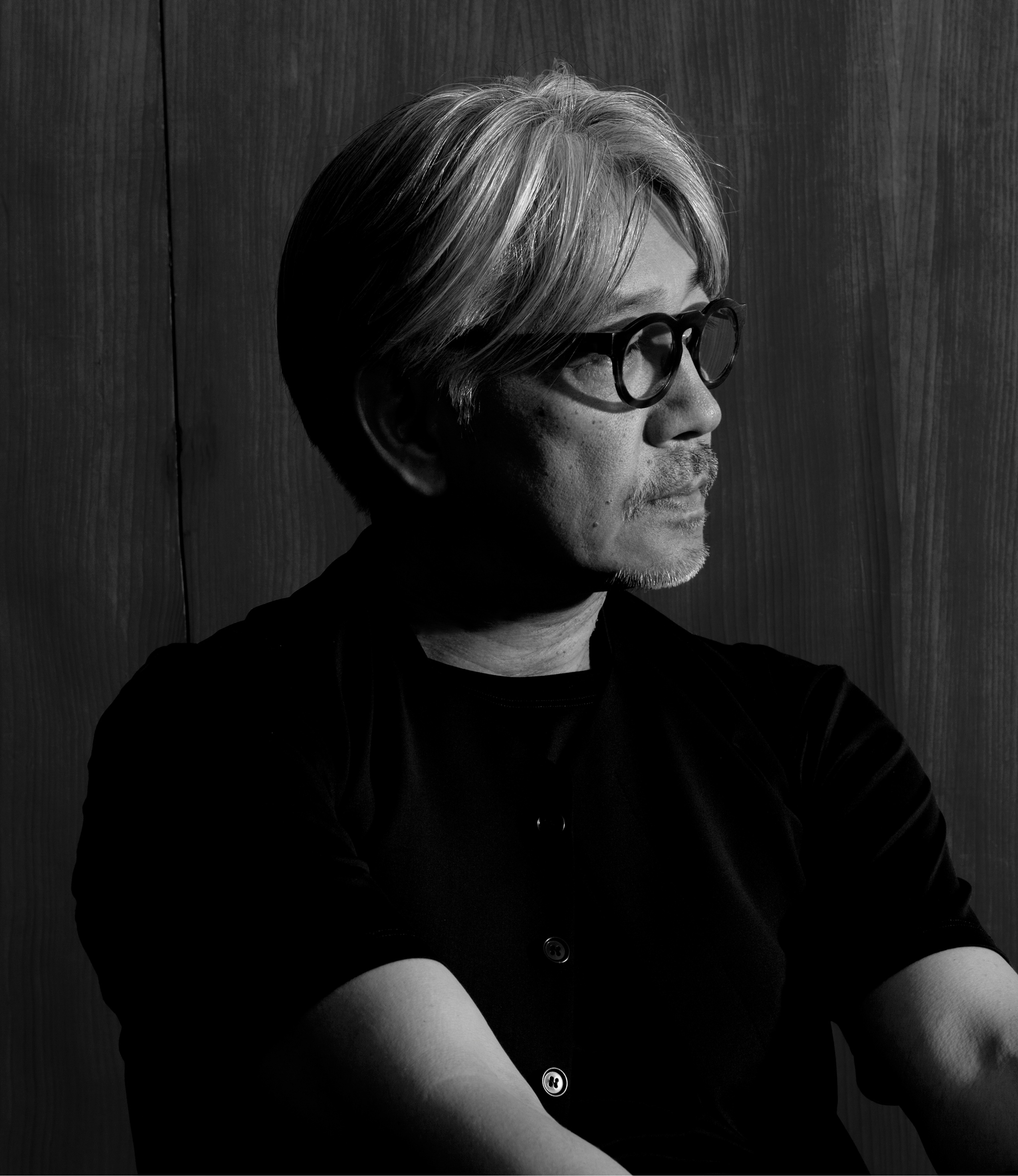
The album Playing the Piano (2009) by Ryuichi Sakamoto was one of the most influential works for Silver making Exercises.

"I think Montreal in the '60s and '70s wanted to be this really futuristic forward-thinking city but now the city's falling apart. The fabric of Montreal is these modernist slabs and long corridors with nothing in them and they give the city a strange, eerie feel. You can't help but feel this hushed awe for the concrete. They are beautiful in their own right but they are oppressive too."

— Silver on the architectural influence on Exercises

In the fall and winter of 2010 and 2011, Michael Silver listened to several synthesizer-heavy modern classical and piano-only works by composers such as Frédéric Chopin, Glenn Gould, Philip Glass, and David Borden. He described them as the "soundtrack" to how he felt "kind of uncertain” in that time period. Listening to these works influenced him to record a piano-and-vocal-only version of a track from his previous extended play The River (2010) titled "It Was Never Meant to Be This Way."

The piano version was included as one of four bonus tracks on digital download releases of The River and also received an official music video that paired the track with "icebox glamor" sequences from the David Cronenberg film Stereo (1969). Stereo was filmed in a brutalist building at the University of Toronto. This combination of the recording of a piano piece and visuals of brutalist architecture created the feeling of an "otherworldly and kind of sad" world that Silver wanted to explore. After creating around five piano-and-synthesizer pieces, Silver decided to produce and release a set of these types of tracks as a record. Architectural elements were noted in a review of the EP for SoundBlab by Daryl Worthington: "The first few tracks exhibit a distinctly urban feel, sounding like soundtracks to a film about architecture."

Ryuichi Sakamoto’s album Playing the Piano (2009) as well as improvisational recordings by composers such as Alva Noto and Fennesz were the most influential works for Silver creating Exercises. The EP also garnered influence from the soundtracks of the National Film Board of Canada and tonal elements from Canadian animator Norman McLaren's sound work.

== Production and composition ==
Work on Exercises began in December 2010, when Michael Silver was packing up to move to Paris. For the EP, he went for a more "structured," classical, and less dance music-based approach with more "simple" compositional structures than his past releases. Exercises was categorized by reviewer Puja Patel as a "dreamy indie flick scored by fuzzy synths and gorgeous piano recitals," while Worthington labeled it as a "pop perspective" of the synthesizer works of Oneohtrix Point Never and Emeralds. Elements of kosmische are also present on the EP.

In producing Exercises, Silver tried to represent warm feel of a concert hall with the limited tools he had to work with. Given that most of the equipment he usually used was packaged in Montreal and he was mostly in a Paris apartment while making the EP, Silver was left with only a laptop. Despite being an instrumental piano EP, Exercises was not recorded on an actual acoustic piano, but rather a software instrument plug-in replicating a piano. While Silver spent hours on a piano experimenting to find which melodies would work for each track, he didn't want them to sound too perfect. An example would be when he was making "Exercise #4 (Spirit)," an improvisational track where he played on a "synth bed" not thinking about the melodies he was coming up with.

In a similar fashion to the LP Ravedeath, 1972 (2011) by Tim Hecker, tracks on Exercises involve piano parts that slowly build, with other sounds such as unnoticeable drums and synthesizers also in the background of the mix on occasion. Making more simple tracks meant Silver had to start writing each of them on a piano instead of on drums or synthesizers as songs from most of his other records were made. As Silver explained, "since I was going for something stripped down I was kind of working with melodic patterns, building melodies on melodies in ways that weren’t necessarily grandiose." Each track on Exercises contains only around three to five instruments and involves "just a lot of different melodies working off each other, bouncing off each other," Silver explained. The simplicity gives each song multi-dynamic emotional aspects. Patel compared the EP's minimal structure to the works of Yellow Magic Orchestra.

Hence the title of the EP, Exercises is a series of tracks that "express" a certain theme rather than "explore" it, Worthington analyzed. Worthington also called the title of the EP appropriate because in each song, the listener can feel a "sense of movement" like the works of German band Neu!. Dummy magazine called Exercises a "deeply affecting record, one that draws you close and comforts." They categorized it as a modern classical record having "the sensitivity" of the works of Sakamoto, "the weightlessness" of Glass' pieces, and the "emotional" tone of the works of Borden. Steve Shaw of Fact magazine described Exercises as a study of internet-released beat tapes and unfinished material from the 2010s. His reason for this categorization was the length of each song on the EP: "any track on Exercises could be developed to far greater length, but Silver’s decision to reign these in is deftly handled."

== Concept ==
Exercises is an album of eight movements that document parts of life; "Exercise #1 (Entry)" is the birth of someone, "Exercise #3 (Buildings)" deals with the growth of a person, "Exercise #5 (September)" is about aging, "Exercise #7 (Loss)" regards the end of someone's life, and "Exercise #8 (Change)" is about what happens after the death of a person. According to Dummy, the EP's intention is to find "a way to articulate the soul, to transcend the pettiness of our existence, to find the poetry in the most base elements of life." The primary message of Exercises, according to Dummy, is that "there is no finish-line in the real world outside of death, no happy ever after," and "we’re never going to have it all figured out."

== Track titles ==
The title of each track is composed of only a number and a word describing it, which, according to writer Erik Burg, suggests all of the recordings on Exercises are "experiments." The song names were originally numbered titles without descriptions. However, after six tracks for the EP were completed, he struggled to remember "which [track]s were which" and found a "visual element" in each song. Thus, he added an adjective to each title to give the listener an idea of what they were hearing.

== Songs ==
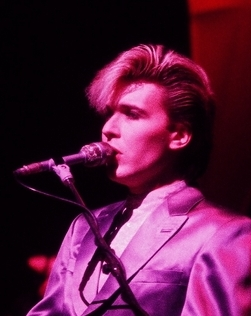
"Exercise #5 (September)" is a "semi-cover" of the opening track on Secrets of the Beehive (1987), an album by English singer-songwriter David Sylvian.

The opener of Exercises, "'Exercise #1 (Entry)," centers around a piano played in a 7/4 time signature that has a sad tone throughout the track's entire length. Around the piano are a set of Vangelis-style synthesized drones and arpeggios that change their vibe from sad to bright as the track progresses. Made by Silver very quickly and influenced by Gould's Variations 1–7, "Exercise #2 (School)" is the brightest track on Exercises in terms of tone. Set in a 9/4 time signature and using dub rhythms, it consists of what Shaw described as a Telefon Tel Aviv-style "clicking beat" and what Silver labeled as "sprouting synth leads that come from either channel." It starts with what PopMatters reviewer Steven Spoerl labeled as "an almost lullaby-like melody." An echo-filtered piano then enters the song, before electronically made drums and bass sounds are added to give the track a calm yet threatening tone. The song was categorized by Marc Hogan of Pitchfork as a "post-Jamie xx bedroom-disco" cut, while Tom Williams of FasterLouder compared it to the works of Aphex Twin.

Silver called "Exercise #3 (Buildings)" the most "pattern-based" track on Exercises, "mainly a set of cycles that build on one another, with some pads and melodies that offer an emotional core." Compared by Worthington to Glass' piece Glassworks, it involves a progressive rock-style synthesized brass performing a fanfare over piano arpeggios and a harsh synth bass a la the Emeralds LP Does It Look Like I'm Here? (2010). "Exercise #4 (Spirit)" was the last recording completed for Exercises. It was inspired by British rock band Talk Talk's song “Wealth,” and its title derived from where "Wealth" came from, Talk Talk's fourth studio LP Spirit of Eden (1988). "Exercise #4 (Spirit)" was performed in improvisation and has a different palette of instruments in comparison to the EP's other tracks, including Yamaha DX7 sounds and pan flute samples. The track is constructed around an electronically produced pump organ sound. Steve Shaw of Fact magazine wrote about the track, "as clicky mid-range keys amble daintily beneath, a butterflies-in-the-stomach sense of quiet excitement is drawn out by increasing vibrato and breathy shakuhachi/vox chord gestures." A rework of "Exercise #4 (Spirit)" was included on CFCF's collaboration album with Jean-Michel Blais titled Cascades (2017).

"Exercise #5 (September)" is a synthpop "semi-cover" of the opening track on English singer-songwriter David Sylvian's album Secrets of the Beehive (1987) that's quadruple the length of the original piano ballad. Silver called "Exercise #5 (September)" a "fully realized" track in terms of instrumentation, consisting of basses, syncopated, single-reed-like synthesizer lines, 2-step-rhythm percussion that include claps and woodblocks, staccato piano notes, and vocals. He felt when he was making the track, it was being "a bit weighed down by ‘songness,’" thus he made a track featuring vocals that sung lyrics. Shaw compared Silver’s vocal performance on the cover to José González. As Jaber Mohamed wrote about the song's feel, "its upbeat tones speak of nostalgia for an idealism that no longer exists and an optimism of the coming future." "Exercise #6 (December)" was the seventh track completed for Exercises and the sixth in the track listing. Recorded in December 2011, it's the most minimal cut on Exercises; its instrumentation includes a piano, slow-attack synth brasses performing harmonies in the style of the LP Amber (1994) by English duo Autechre, and a mid-octave synthesized bell counter-melody representing snow. Silver said that it is about a "lost winter feeling" with "moments of tenderness, confusion, elation."

Categorized by Williams as a downtempo track in the style of the works of Jean Michel Jarre, "Exercise #7 (Loss)" centers around a triple metre piano with sawtooth wave sounds and vibraphones that fade in and combine to a "cloud" around it, wrote Shaw. Worthington analyzes that "Exercise #6 (December)" and "Exercise #7 (Loss)" depart from the "distinctly urban" element of the other tracks on Exercises for a "warmer" and "earthier" tone with quieter synthesizer textures. Exercises closes with "Exercise #8 (Change)," also called by Hogan a "post-Jamie xx bedroom-disco" track and featuring what Williams described as a "sombre post-dubstep" atmosphere. The song only includes electronic sounds unlike the previous tracks and was labeled by SIlver as "forward-looking" in terms of vibe. As Silver explained, the song uses tons of reverb to represent "room for growth and room to build." It depict layers of synth sounds filtered in Fennesz-style distortion that, as he put it, "suddenly drop off [...] into the unknown" when the track ends."

== Artwork ==
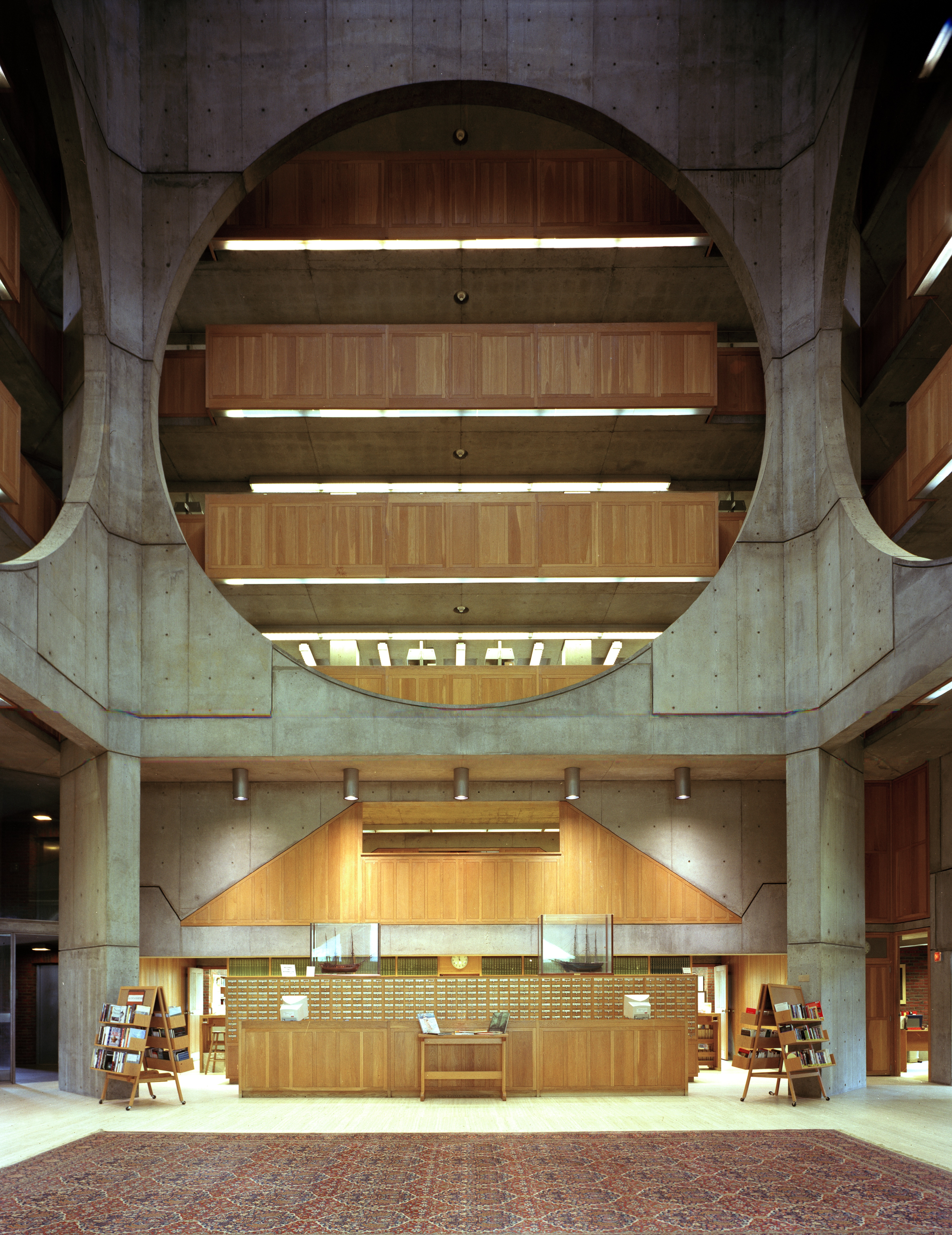
The cover art for Exercises depicts a photograph of the Phillips Exeter Academy Library in New Hampshire.

The artwork for Exercises was designed by Josh Clancy and Travis Stearns. It depicts a photograph by Ken Schwarz of the Phillips Exeter Academy Library in New Hampshire, one of the architectural buildings the EP was inspired by. It more specifically shows a library of empty book shelves. It landed at number 24 on a list of "The 25 Best Album Covers of 2012" by Complex magazine, writing that "it's the kind of view that would make L.B. Jefferies grab his binoculars."

== Release and promotion ==
On February 2, 2012, “Exercise #3 (Building)” was released as an online MP3 download. An official music video for the track was released on June 11, 2012. Directed by Adam Beck, the black-and-white video involves a woman who is able to make any object turn into color and glow. Putting in regard the "future-retro" feel of the architecture that influenced Exercises, Beck read the young adult novel The Giver (1993) to develop a dystopian viewpoint of brutalist buildings for the video. Tom Breihan of Stereogum compared the video to the 1998 film Pleasantville. On April 6, 2012, Spin magazine premiered "Exercise #5 (September)," and on May 11, Silver performed the cover as part of a performance sessions series by Yours Truly. On April 12, 2012, Exercises became available worldwide via streaming. Paper Bag Records released the EP in United States digital stores on April 24, and Dummy Records issued it on vinyl in the United Kingdom on August 6.

== Critical reception ==
Professional ratings
Aggregate scores
Source	Rating
Metacritic	74/100
Review scores
Source	Rating
Beats Per Minute	58%
Fact	4/5
Hour Community	4.5/5 stars
Metro	4/5 stars
Mojo	4/5 stars
NME	4/5 stars
Pitchfork	8/10
PopMatters	7/10 stars
Spin	8/10
Uncut	3.5/5 stars

Some reviewers highlighted Silver's expansion of his musical style scope with Exercises. Hogan and Mohamed wrote that this was due to Silver's uses of classical music and kosmische elements on the EP. A 4.5-out-of-5-star review came from critic Jess Locke of Hour Community, who called Exercises "another stunner." PopMatters reviewer Steven Spoerl labeled Exercises the most "irresistible" instrumental piano record since An Accidental Memory in the Case of Death (2004) by ambient recording artist Eluvium. As Spoerl opined, "It’s incredibly easy to be dragged into Exercises and as the record progresses, it becomes incredibly difficult to leave." He summarized that while the EP isn't a masterpiece, it still "comes close enough to keep everyone not only interested, but invested." As Kenny S. McGuane from Under the Radar wrote, "although it lacks the beat-oriented, build-and-release formula of his best work, Exercises is elegant, textured, and cerebral enough to be an excellent after-hours soundtrack." Adam Blyweiss of Treble called Exercises a "fascinating repeat listen" because its tracks "feel like they’ve become sentient, curious to know where they are and what they’re doing here. Remixes don’t do that; witch house hasn’t quite, either."

Worthington felt that the influences of synthesizer music by acts such Emeralds, Oneohtrix Point Never, and Tim Hecker used on Exercises were "obvious" but praised the record for how it used these influences to "condense them into short sharp and melodic pieces." Arwa Haider wrote in her review for Metro that the EP's "eight tracks appear subtle and unstrained, yet Exercises is carefully studded with so many beautiful details that it never feels insubstantial." A journalist for The Verge similarly called it a "heavily textured, slow-burning collection of tunes — I'm still finding new auditory delights each time I listen to it." A review from Daniel Korn called the record the "kind of music that works as beautiful background music, but holds up under close scrutiny as well." A writer for Filter magazine highlighted the instrumentation of the EP: "The chamber-piano infused into these eight experiments is sometimes utterly heartrending—those pulsating synthesizers sound like they could pump blood and breathe oxygen." A Prefix magazine critic analyzed that while fans of CFCF's previous records may be turned off by the EP's style, it showcases Silver's "true" and "exciting" composition abilities.

More mixed reviews of Exercises criticized the EP for focusing too much on sounding nice rather than having many moments that excite the listener. Ray Finlayson, a fan of CFCF's past works, gave Exercises a mixed review for Beats Per Minute. He described the EP as a set of "pleasant music" with "a few quite intriguing and solid moments." However, a major criticism in his review was that to some listeners, the EP could "become background music all too easily." He summarized, "While Silver’s work will always have a degree of ambience to it, Exercises can completely disappear from your consciousness if you don’t pay enough attention, especially during the last few tracks. And while in no way do I want CFCF to be forgotten, Exercises makes it very easy for Silver’s work to fade out of view." Stephen Judge of Blurt magazine, while calling the EP "nice," felt that it "often fades so completely into the background, or one’s consciousness," which "could mean it’s being marketed in the wrong genre." He called the EP "too much like the short drizzle" with very few "brief rainbows" or surprises.

The EP landed at number 14 on a list of the best dance and electronic releases of 2012 by Exclaim!. It also ranked number 97 on a year-end list of "Favorite Albums" by Drowned in Sound.

== Track listing ==
All track lengths adapted from 7digital.

No.	Title	Length
1.	"Exercise 1 (Entry)"	2:34
2.	"Exercise 2 (School)"	3:18
3.	"Exercise 3 (Buildings)"	3:23
4.	"Exercise 4 (Spirit)"	2:06
5.	"Exercise 5 (September)"	4:30
6.	"Exercise 6 (December)"	3:38
7.	"Exercise 7 (Loss)"	4:01
8.	"Exercise 8 (Change)"	2:59
Total length:		26:29

== Personnel ==
Derived from the liner notes of Exercises.

- Written, produced, and recorded by Michael Silver at his Montreal-based home and Paris in 2011.
- Lyrics on "Exercise 5 (September)" by David Sylvian
- Mastered by Anders Peterson at GS Mastering & Post in Stockholm, Sweden.
- Artwork photography by Ken Schwarz
- Artwork designed by Josh Clancy and Travis Stearns

== Release history ==
Region	Date	Format(s)	Label
United States	April 24, 2012	Digital download	Paper Bag
United Kingdom	August 6, 2012	Vinyl	Dummy
