= Music for Objects =

EP by CFCF
- Released: July 1, 2013
- Genres: Electronica; minimal; neoclassical
- Length: 23:54
- Labels: Paper Bag; Dummy
- Producer: CFCF

CFCF chronology
Exercises (2012)	Music for Objects (2013)	Outside (2013)

Singles from Music for Objects
- 1. "Camera" Released: June 5, 2013

Music for Objects is an extended play by Canadian electronic musician Michael Silver, known by his stage name as CFCF. The EP is a 24-minute set of eight compositions that are meant to showcase the emotion of everyday objects, a concept inspired by Wim Wenders' documentary film Notebook on Cities and Clothes (1989). Music for Objects has the same ambient feel as CFCF's previous EP Exercises (2012) but with a much more uplifting tone. Music for Objects was released in July 2013 in European territories by Dummy Records and in North America by Paper Bag Records, and garnered favorable reviews from professional reviewers upon its distribution. Some critics wrote it was enjoyable without knowing its object concept, while others praised how it represented the objects.

== Concept and composition ==
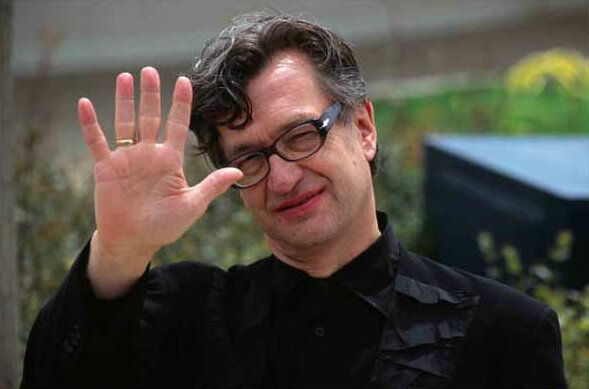
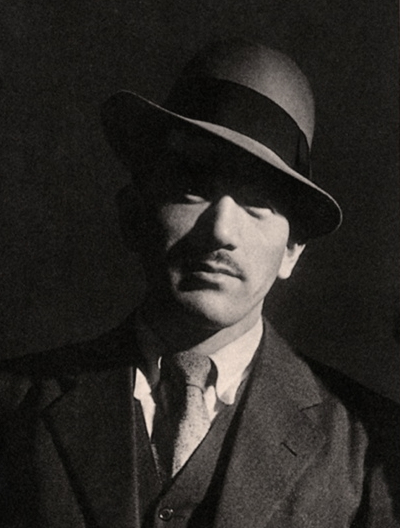
The films of Wim Wenders (left) and Yasujirō Ozu (right) inspired Music for Objects.

"The music is using objects as a central theme but in reality the music is obviously about humans. I can’t say that a bowl or a glass really has this emotional element to them, it just doesn’t happen until a human being enters the room. So I wouldn’t say I’m trying to break away from any typical understanding of music – it’s still very human-centric – but it’s about shifting the focus away from our thoughts and feelings and looking at our surroundings, appreciating them, and seeing how our feelings might shape our perception of them. That probably sounds silly, but that’s great. "

— Silver on the relation between humans and objects in Music for Objects

After completing CFCF's 2012 EP Exercises, Silver initially planned the next release to be a mixtape with the same vibe as Exercises but with a "simpler" structure. The works of Yasujirō Ozu inspired Silver to make a record with a more "simple," "smaller[-]scale" and less "expansive" feel than his past works. In the summer of 2012, Silver watched Wim Wenders' Notebook on Cities and Clothes (1989), a documentary film about Japanese fashion designer Yohji Yamamoto. One of the film's topics was about the value of clothing in relation to places all across the world. Silver felt the film's discussion towards this topic "g[a]ve the clothes a tangible quality." As he explained, "I was looking at objects around me and thinking about how to convey something intangible about these objects. To try to translate those intangibles into something musical and emotional.”

In composing pieces for the EP, Silver was influenced by the works of Steve Reich, Philip Glass, and Yasuaki Shimizu's album Music for Commercials (1987). The track-making process for Music for Objects involved Silver first writing a composition then choosing an object he felt the composition would be a perfect soundtrack for. He explained that in each piece of the extended play, an object represents the emotion of the composition and that it wasn't until later on in writing a piece that he discovered an emotion for the object. However, there are some songs on Music for Objects where their non-emotive elements fit with the objects they are about. "Ring," for instance, has a "circular" compositional structure that consists of three movements that connect with each other like a ring.

Silver said that Music for Objects is about "how the form of the object has an impact on the way that [he] approach[es] the world" and "the small things in life to express something larger and life-affirming." The focus on small objects gave the record a more upbeat and "romantic" tone than Exercises. As Silver said, "instead of feelings of loss or nostalgia which were present in the last record, this one is more about those moments when your heart is full and even the small, silly things fill your world up with joy." In categorizing Music for Objects, Beats Per Minute's Ray Finlayson wrote that it has the same ambient style as Exercises but with the upbeat feeling of CFCF's debut album Continent (2009).

Music for Objects, as Popmatters writer Jennifer Kelly analyzed, has a complex compositional structure featuring "clear, bell-like melodies." The tracks are primarily focused on rhythm, with the melodies usually performing ostinato-esque riffs that only serve as another component to the EP's rhythmic element. A Treble magazine writer compared the EP to the music of Brian Eno due to its "heavy emphases on flow and lulling the listener into the meditative loop."

"Keys," the most beat-driven cuts on Music for Objects, derived from a song that was made for the EP while it was still conceived as a mixtape but never became a part of the final track listing. The unused track combined snippets of Ryuichi Sakamoto's ambient album Three (2012) and a release by Steve "Silk" Hurley. He felt the combination led to a "demure and almost romantic aspect" to the track "that was both comforting and quite weird at the same time." Silver described "Keys" as a hybrid of "the weirder aspects of techno that are happening right now" and the "fourth world" styles of Jon Hassell and Yasuaki Shimizu.

== Sound design ==
The instrumentation of Music for Objects primarily consists of digital orchestral sounds such as drums, pianos, guitars, basses, strings and mallets, built from combining layers of wavetables and samples. Silver felt making layers of electronic sounds that made orchestral textures led to "not-quite-right-sounding instruments" that gave the tracks "a bit of extra mystery, another veil in a sense.” A saxophone performance from Montreal noise musician Francesco De Gallo is the only sound on the EP that was recorded instead of created from digital textures. However, as described by Kelly, "even the saxophone has been altered, stretched, skewed and denatured, to the point where it seems more like a dream world stand-in for the actual instrument than the thing itself."

A majority of the sounds on Music for Objects were inspired by the keyboard-produced sounds used in the works of Peter Gabriel, and Silver felt the EP's use of these "useful and evocative" "very early keyboard" sounds gave it a "very strange, surreal," and "forced" element. Silver went for sounds that are only used on very few records and often "get thrown by the way side." As Silver described the piano, drum and synthesizer arrangement on “Perfume," "They have this ringing Eastern quality to them that chimes out while also sounding very artificial. It’s the kind of sound that’s very one of a kind and very flashy and cavernous and evocative.”

== Release and promotion ==
The first track from Music for Objects that was released was "Camera," which was issued on June 5, 2013 as the EP's lead single. On July 1, Pitchfork Advance hosted a stream for the entire EP. Dummy Records released the EP to digital stores in Ireland and Switzerland on July 5, 2013. Dummy released Music for Objects on vinyl and for digital download in the United Kingdom on July 8, 2013. On July 9, Paper Bag Records issued Music for Objects in North American territories such as Canada and the United States.

== Critical reception ==
Professional ratings
Aggregate scores
Source	Rating
Metacritic	79/100
Review scores
Source	Rating
The 405	7.5/10
AllMusic	4/5 stars
Beats Per Minute	68%
Blurt	4/5 stars
The Line of Best Fit	7/10
Loud and Quiet	8/10
Nothing but Hope and Passion	("Recommended")
Pitchfork	7.3/10
XLR8R	8/10

A common praise in reviews of Music for Objects was its sonic representation of the objects. Finlayson honored it for "mov[ing] beyond stereotypical ideas," writing that "at its best – primarily the two middle cuts, “Camera” and Keys” – the EP seems to transport you to another world, if not try to create one." Blurt magazine critic Jennifer Kelly wrote, "this is music for objects, not about them. Yet Silver does succeed in finding the transcendent in small, closely defined musical motifs that fit into ordinary experience like a set of keys fits the hand. And, in doing so, he imbues the mundane with a spiritual significance and beauty." Zach Kelly, who wrote a review for Pitchfork, praised the EP for representing such seemingly non-important things with "wide arrays of emotion," writing that "[Silver] brings things to life in ways that wouldn't feel unfamiliar to OCD sufferers quick to anthropomorphize objects lying around the apartment." He writes, "Music for Objects is, above all else, a record about perspective, one that requires you to look at the familiar from a different angle, and in doing so do the most impressive illuminations take place." Overall, he called it "another excellent chapter in CFCF's story, a strong case for how much unexpected magic can be found in the ordinary."

A Loud and Quiet reviewer called Music for Objects a "dynamic EP" that "is compelling and anything but boring," while David Jeffries, writing for Allmusic, labeled it an "Album Pick" and "a fine listen, offering CFCF fans the restrained, smart music they crave." Nathan Reese, writing a review for XLR8R, complimented the EP for not being "overly academic," writing that "during its best moments, Music for Objects could even be described as fun." He compared the record to Ambient 1: Music for Airports (1978) by Brian Eno in that all the songs can be enjoyed in any situation without knowledge of the actual subject matter: "While it's fun knowing what a song is about, it's unnecessary to envision the platonic ideal of a turnstile to enjoy the album track of the same name."

Mike Emerson, a critic for The 405, similarly wrote that Music for Objects could be enjoyed without knowing its main concept. However, he also criticized the use of a main idea for the EP for not improving the listening experience in any way; in fact, he joked that "Lamp" "makes [him] think of a microwave more than a light bulb, or even a kettle maybe." Similarly, Laurence Day of The Line of Best Fit called the object concept a "bit of a gimmick," and wrote that the EP, "while home to a very interesting premise and copious technical perfection, lacks much charm outside of the scheme it was intended for." However, Day still gave Music for Objects a favorable review, calling the record a "substantial EP full of intriguing ditties made up from intelligent electronica, neo-classical minimalism and piano balladry."

Finlayson called the record "surprisingly, if not frustratingly passive," where its "highlights make an impression for sure, but otherwise you can find yourself not having taken much in." Finlayson also praised Silver for going for a more "lively" and upbeat feel than Exercises: "At the very least instead of sounding like he was curling up into a melancholic hibernating state as on Exercises, here he sounds like he once again wants to fight the boredom and start actively engaging the listener on all levels." However, he also wrote that some of the EP's tracks, including “Lamp,” “Bowl,” and “Turnstile,” are "mundane" as they "have interesting traits but they’re not devoted to being entirely ambient or solely engaging tracks in themselves."

== Track listing ==
Track lengths from the liner notes of Music For Objects.

No.	Title	Length
1.	"Glass"	4:03
2.	"Bowl"	2:04
3.	"Turnstile"	2:10
4.	"Camera"	3:30
5.	"Keys"	4:09
6.	"Perfume"	1:35
7.	"Lamp"	3:26
8.	"Ring"	2:57
Total length:		23:54

== Personnel ==
Derived from the liner notes of Music For Objects.

- Written and produced by Michael Silver
- Mastered by Tom Branton at Joao Carvalho Mastering in Toronto, Ontario
- Saxophone on "Camera" by Francesco De Gallo
- Design by Oval-X
