= Continent (CFCF album) =

Studio album by CFCF
- Released: October 27, 2009
- Recorded: 2008–09
- Studios: Michael Silver's home, Montreal
- Genres: Electronic dance music; electropop
- Length: 1:05:20
- Label: Paper Bag
- Producer: CFCF

CFCF chronology
Panesian Nights (2009)	Continent (2009)	The Drift (2010)

Singles from Continent
- 1. "You Hear Colours" / "Invitation to Love" Released: March 27, 2009; 2. "Monolith" Released: September 9, 2009

Alternate cover

Continent is the debut studio album by Canadian electronic musician Michael Silver, known by his stage name as CFCF. It was released on October 27, 2009 by the label Paper Bag Records. Continent is a downtempo dance album that was described by one reviewer as "dance music that doesn't want you to dance." It includes elements from a variety of styles such as IDM, balearic, synthpop, rave, and disco and differs from later CFCF albums more focused on new age and ambient compositions. Continent features a cover of the song "Big Love" by Fleetwood Mac. The LP garnered very favorable reviews from professional music reviewers, praises going towards its compositions, arrangements and use of musical styles.

== Content ==
Continent is an electropop album that includes elements from a variety of genres, such as IDM, balearic, soft rock, European synth-pop, rave, boogie, house, ambient, lounge, jazz, and Italo disco. Pitchfork writer Ryan Dombal analogized Continent as a tech noir film soundtrack: "There's the umbrella-less, lonely walk scene ("Raining Patterns"), the nightclub scene (the cover of Fleetwood Mac's "Big Love"), the hacking-the-mainframe scene ("Break-In"), the slow, ambiguous fade-out ("You Hear Colours")." Continent follows a downtempo dance music style that has been described by Mxdown as "a milder form of dance music that soothes as well as grooves," by reviewer Patric Fallon as "more about the upper half of your body than the lower," and by David Ritter in a review for Coke Machine Glow as "dance music that doesn't want you to dance."

Critic Zach Kelly wrote that some cuts on the album that have a melancholy or "ethereal, out-of-body" feel are "unapologetically svelte tunes jam-packed with cues taken from body-high inducing ambient atmospherics, beatific house loopings, 70s AM Easy Cheese, and bubbly Balearic turns." Ritter wrote, "This record wants you to feel not sad or angry but as if you are, say, in a government-town city centre at 4am, or a parking lot under a red sun. It's not a cinematic mode of intuition, exactly, since there's no plot; but there is the development of impression through time, as if the space gets sharper and more detailed as the song goes on." Ritter wrote that each track is an evocative "space" a listener is brought in; these spaces take a variety of forms, such as spaces "filled with regret," "with the anticipation of an event just about to begin," "with people and things, stone-still in a frozen tableau," or "emotional spaces, again not something like "happy" but the headspace you're in when, for instance, you step off a cross-state bus into a very bright day."

A Tilt magazine critic highlighted Silver's experimental musical arrangement techniques on the album: "Subtle shifts in tempo will transition into the next track, What may have been a background pad will become the lead synth, Sudden switch-over from faint drums to a breathy latin percussion." As critic Bruce Tantum wrote, the album consists of "cascading keyboard runs, languid guitar strums, deliberate tempos and drifting atmospherics." As Tim Sendra wrote, the record mostly has "lush synths, rubbery basslines, tinkling pianos, 4/4 beats, drifting ambient waves, and peaceful melodies throughout, as well as the occasional screaming guitar line and laid-back vocal." He compared Continent to the works of U.F. Orb, Aphex Twin, and Soul Family Sensation, while Ray Finlayson, writing for Beats Per Minute, compared it to music by electronic acts such as Diskjokke and Deadmau5 for its use of "energetic and attention-grabbing loops, thumping beats and bouncy piano." Mike Newmark, writing for Popmatters, highlighted the album's "clean" structure, analyzing that "there isn't a note, a beat, an instrument or a maneuver that sounds as if it doesn't belong smack dab in its very spot."

Continent features a cover of Fleetwood Mac's "Big Love," which increases the pace of the original source material and includes what Ritter described as a "rare lead vocal" that's very low in volume in comparison with the other instruments in the mix. The post-disco track "Invitation to Love" is named after the show within a show from the David Lynch television series Twin Peaks. It is based on a sample of the song "Voyager" by The Alan Parsons Project. It includes what Finlayson described as a "dulled buzz" synthesizer, a 1980s-style guitar solo, and handclaps. Finlayson jokingly wrote that there are tracks on Continent that "suggest the album title should have been pluralised;" an example he used was "Letters Home," which consists of strings instrument common in European dance music as well as Native American-esque pan flutes.

== Release and promotion ==
On March 27, 2009, the double A-side single "You Hear Colours"/"Invitation to Love" was released for a limited edition of 500 copies by the label Acephale. On September 9, 2009, "Monolith" was premiered by the online edition of magazine The Fader. Paper Bag Records finally released Continent worldwide on October 27, 2009.

== Critical reception ==
Professional ratings
Review scores
Source	Rating
AllMusic	3.5/5 stars
Beats Per Minute	78%
Coke Machine Glow	81%
Fact	6/10
Now	4/5 stars
Pitchfork	7.7/10
PopMatters	6/10 stars
Time Out New York	4/5 stars
Tilt	5/5 stars
XLR8R	8/10

Chart Attack called Continent a "minor miracle" due to successfully combining "icy synths" with kraut-rock sounds while in many others LPs trying to do the same thing, "the combination falls flat on record and it's a challenge to make them more than the sum of their parts." He also called the record "surprisingly organic," showing "new sonic textures with each listen." A five-star review from a Tilt magazine critic said that the LP "ascends all expectations" and has "a musical theory that far exceeds my own understanding." Tantum, writing for the New York edition of Time Out, called the record's songs "evocative tunes capable of summoning any range of emotions," praising Silver's arrangement skill on the tracks. Sendra praised Continent for its presence of Silver's "programming skills, his light touch, his knowledge of the styles, and his gift for concocting songs with melodies that stick in your ear." Finlayson called Continent "cohesive, engaging and enjoyable to sit all the way through," writing that "there's always something happening to demand the attention of the listener." However, he also criticized the LP for being "almost predictable" in some parts.

Kelly, in his review for Pitchfork, wrote that Continent was a "rich[] experience when looked at as independent of any peripheral distraction, with its pop-friendly attention-grabbers very much in the foreground." He praised how Silver used nostalgic elements on the LP: "Where artists like Neon Indian or Washed Out rely on instant gratification to transport a listener back to specific time or feeling, CFCF's music is less concerned with arriving at a discernible destination than it is with detailing the journey." One criticism in Kelly's review was the long length of the tracks: "Large parts of Continent may be considered too cautious or circuitous for the casual listener [...] However, by employing a bit of listener fortitude, you'll hopefully unlock the vibrancy that lies at Continent's core and defines it as the sure-footed, elegantly stated electro-pop record it most certainly is." Benjamin Boles of Now magazine praised Silver's "futuristic reimaginings of vintage sounds and [his] strong sense of good old-fashioned melody."

Ritter called Continent "dense, detailed electronic music that is ever more evocative as the minutes, tracks, and repeated listens accumulate." He wrote in his review for Coke Machine Glow, "What separates CFCF's accomplished debut from other leisurely, ambient-ish electronic records is his dead-on pop sensibilities and the inexhaustible depth of his craft. Where others fall into the musical-wallpaper trap or are too easily slotted into one ambience-by-numbers or another, CFCF shapes his tracks to build seamlessly toward climaxes that are just so, and no more, before pulling everything back a little." A reviewer for Prefix magazine analogized Continent as "driving in a foreign sports car along a coastal road to your mistress' Italian villa." He praised the LP's "uniformity" but also wrote that it was a slightly negative aspect of the record and what prevented it from being "great:" "CFCF teases his work's build-up for too long. Continent never takes us to that villa, or at least lets us fool around in the backseat with a wanton Mrs. Officer who pulls us over for speeding because we really, really want to get to that villa."

A mixed review came from Jay Shockley of Fact magazine, describing Continent as an "instrumental record that often sounds very nice, but rarely achieves much beyond that." Newmark also had a mixed opinion on the album; he praised it for being "remarkably disciplined, with Silver demonstrating the kind of restraint that usually takes two or three albums to achieve," comparing this achievement with that of The xx's self-titled debut album. He also honored Silver for establishing a "signature sound" a listener could identify on his first album: "It's because Silver is confident in his tools, mostly vintage analogue synthesizers or what passes for them digitally nowadays, and he adheres to them with such genuine enthusiasm that it's hard not to be as taken with his methodology as he is." However, Newmark also dismissed Continent for being "so well-planned, so devoid of errancies and so fixated on doing everything right that, truthfully, most of it just bored me to tears."

== Track listing ==
Derived from the liner notes of Continent.

No.	Title	Length
1.	"Raining Patterns"	7:25
2.	"Big Love"	6:22
3.	"Invitation To Love"	6:06
4.	"Summerlong"	1:53
5.	"You Hear Colours"	5:38
6.	"Monolith"	7:11
7.	"Half Dreaming"	5:28
8.	"Letters Home"	4:58
9.	"Break-In"	3:08
10.	"Come Closer"	6:07
11.	"Snake Charmer"	8:23
12.	"Half Dreaming Reprise"	2:41
Total length:		1:05:20

== Personnel ==
Adapted from the liner notes of Continent.

- All tracks written by Michael Silver, with the exception of "Big Love" which was written by Lindsey Buckingham
- Produced and recorded by Silver at his Montreal home from 2008 to 2009
- Mastered by Ryan Mills
- Artwork by Them Finest
- Artwork photography by Jimmy Limit
