= Dip in the Pool (band) =

Japanese pop duo

Dip in the Pool is a Japanese pop duo consisting of Miyako Koda (voices) and Tatsuji Kimura (keyboards), who have made eight albums. Their UK album Silence was released through Rough Trade Records in 1986. Their track "Izmir" is the ending music of the PlayStation game, Omega Boost. Koda is also an actress and has appeared in "Fanshî dansu" (Fancy Dance, 1989), "Hakuchi" (1999), and "Kanaria" (2005).

== Discography ==
=== Albums ===
- Dip in the Pool (1986, previous works collection CD; also released in UK on Rough Trade Records titled Silence)
- 10 Palettes (1988, East West Records)
- Retinae (1989, Moon/East West)
- Aurorae (1991, Moon/East West, produced by Peter Scherer)
- The Sea of Serenity (1993, Epic Records)
- KM 93.11 (1993, Sony Records)
- 7 (1994, Epic)
- Wonder 8 (1997, grandisc Records)
- Brown Eyes (25 May 2011, Bellwood Records)
- Highwire Walker (21 Jan 2015, Bellwood Records)
- 8 Red Now (30 October 2021, grandisc Records)

==== Miyako Koda (solo) ====
- Jupiter (1998, grandisc Records)

=== EPs ===
- "Dip in the Pool" (1985, Moon/East West, produced by Seigen Ono)
- "太陽のしっぽ" (1986, Moon/East West, produced by Seigen Ono)
- "Miracle Play‧on Christmas Day" / "天使が降る夜" (1988, Moon/East West)
- "Miracle Play" (1995 Epic)
