= Virtue signalling =

Pejorative term

Virtue signalling is a pejorative neologism for the expression of a moral viewpoint with the intent of communicating good character, frequently used to suggest hypocrisy. An accusation of virtue signalling can be applied to both individuals and companies.

Virtue signalling often describes behaviour meant to gain social approval without taking meaningful action, such as in greenwashing, where companies exaggerate their environmental commitments. On social media, large movements such as Blackout Tuesday were accused of lacking substance, and celebrities or public figures are frequently charged with virtue signalling when their actions seem disconnected from their public stances. However, some argue that these expressions of outrage or moral alignment may reflect genuine concern, and that accusing others of virtue signalling can itself be a form of signalling. This inverse concept has been described as vice signalling and refers to the public promotion of negative or controversial views to appear tough, pragmatic, or rebellious, often for political or social capital.

== Definition and usage ==
According to the Cambridge Dictionary, virtue signalling is "an attempt to show other people that you are a good person, for example by expressing opinions that will be acceptable to them, especially on social media... indicating that one has virtue merely by expressing disgust or favour for certain political ideas or cultural happenings". The expression is often used to imply that the virtue being signalled is exaggerated or insincere.

The concept of virtue signalling is most often used by those on the political right to denigrate the behaviour of those on the political left. It is similar to the idea of grandstanding. One practice sometimes cited as an example of virtue signalling is greenwashing, when a company deceptively claims or suggests that its products or policies are more environmentally friendly than they actually are. Some sustainability advocates have suggested ecological virtue signalling by corporations is not necessarily negative, as long as it is accompanied by taking responsibility for past environmental harms. Merriam-Webster editor Emily Brewster has likened virtue signalling to the term humblebragging.

== History ==
David Shariatmadari writes in The Guardian that the term has been used since at least 2004, appearing for example in religious academic works in 2010 and 2012. Nassim Nicholas Taleb cites Matthew 6:1 as an example of "virtue signalling" being condemned as a vice in antiquity ("Beware of practicing your piety before others in order to be seen by them; for then you have no reward from your Father in heaven").

British journalist James Bartholomew claims to have originated the pejorative usage of the term "virtue signalling" in 2015. He wrote in The Spectator that:

No one actually has to do anything. Virtue comes from mere words or even from silently held beliefs. There was a time in the distant past when people thought you could only be virtuous by doing things...[that] involve effort and self-sacrifice.

== Examples ==
=== Social media ===
Angela Nagle, in her book Kill All Normies, described Internet reactions to the Kony 2012 viral video as "what we might now call 'virtue signaling'", and that "the usual cycles of public displays of outrage online began as expected with inevitable competitive virtue signaling" in the aftermath of the killing of Harambe. B. D. McClay wrote in The Hedgehog Review that signalling particularly flourished in online communities. It was unavoidable in digital interactions because they lacked the qualities of offline life, such as spontaneity. When one filled out a list of one's favourite books for Facebook, one was usually aware of what that list said about oneself.

Blackout Tuesday, a 2020 collective action that was ostensibly intended to combat racism and police brutality mainly by businesses and celebrities through social media in response to the killings of several Black people by police officers, was criticized as a form of virtue signalling for the initiative's "lack of clarity and direction".

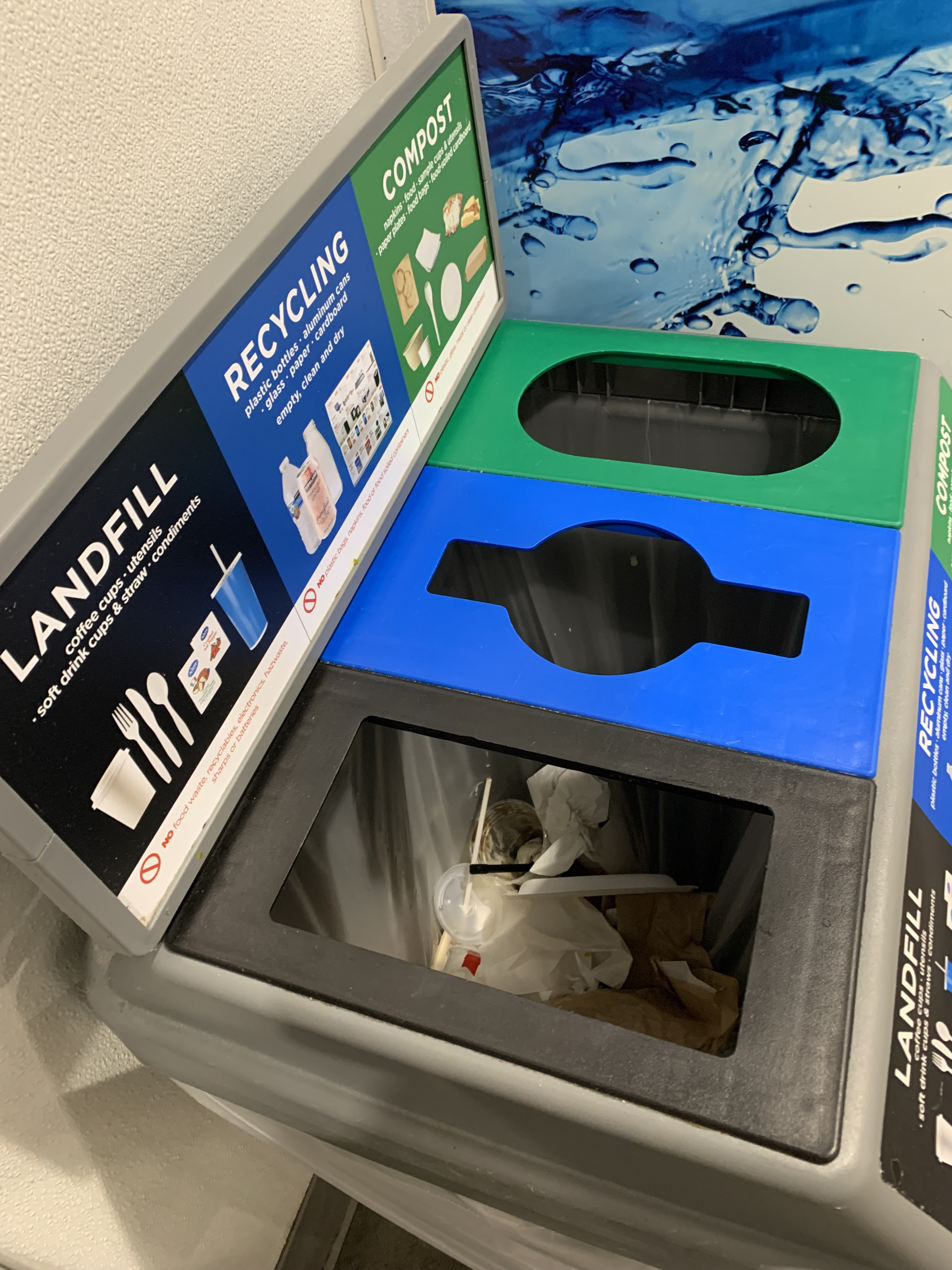
Recycling and trash separator paired with a single can that co-mingles all waste, pretending to sort waste

In 2024, the pro-Palestinian political slogan "All Eyes on Rafah" went viral after an AI-generated image of the phrase was shared on social media. Some users criticized the campaign as a form of virtue signalling and compared it to Blackout Tuesday, and believed that it would be more important for people to post actual pictures of Rafah.

=== Marketing ===
In addition to individuals, companies have also been accused of virtue signalling in marketing, public relations, and brand communication. Companies have also been accused of using virtue signalling as a form of marketing.

=== Film industry ===
Actors and other celebrities may be accused of virtue-signalling if their actions are seen to contradict their expressed views.

== Reception ==
Psychologists Jillian Jordan and David Rand argue that virtue signalling is separable from genuine outrage towards a particular belief, but in most cases, individuals who are virtue signalling are, in fact, simultaneously experiencing genuine outrage. Linguist David Shariatmadari argues in The Guardian that the very act of accusing someone of virtue signalling is an act of virtue signalling in itself. Zoe Williams, also writing for The Guardian, suggested the phrase was the "sequel insult to champagne socialist".

== Vice signalling ==
Financial Times editor Robert Shrimsley suggested the term vice signalling as a counterpoint to virtue signalling:

A vice-signaller boasts about sneaking meat into a vegetarian meal. He will rush on to social media to denounce as a "snowflake" any woman who objects to receiving rape threats, or any minority unhappy at a racist joke ... Vice-signallers have understood that there is money to be made in the outrage economy by playing the villain. Perhaps, secretly, they buy their clothes at the zero-waste shop and help out at the local food bank, but cannot be caught doing so lest their image is destroyed.

Stephen Bush, also in the Financial Times, describes vice signalling as "ostentatious displays of authoritarianism designed to reassure voters that you are 'tough' on crime or immigration", and that it "risks sending what is, in a democracy, the most dangerous signal of all: that politicians do not really care about their electorate’s concerns, other than as a device to win and to hold on to their own power". In particular, Bush cited Donald Trump's Mexican border wall pledge and Boris Johnson's Rwanda asylum plan.

Examples of vice signalling have been described as "show[ing] you are tough, hard-headed, a dealer in uncomfortable truths, and, above all, that you live in 'the real world'", in a way that goes beyond what actual pragmatism requires, or to "a public display of immorality, intended to create a community based on cruelty and disregard for others, which is proud of it at the same time".

According to Olúfẹ́mi O. Táíwò, "a vice signaler is trying to look bad—but not to everyone. A vice signaler typically violates moral or other standards of an out-group precisely in order to look good to the fellow members of some in-group...The moral commitments of the in-group are basically irrelevant: all that matters is owning the enemy."

Austrian linguist Ruth Wodak described the "antisemitic and revisionist utterances" of Austrian politician Jörg Haider in the 1980s as an example of vice signalling.

== See also ==
- Conspicuous consumption — effort to signal wealth rather than virtue
- Do-gooder derogation
- Double standard
- Luxury belief
- Moral high ground
- Performative activism
- Political correctness
- Political expressive behaviour
- Purity test
- Signalling theory — namesake
- Slacktivism
- Social justice warrior
- Status dog
- Suicidal empathy
- Woke
