= Capitalist Realism =

2009 book by Mark Fisher

Capitalist Realism: Is There No Alternative?
- Author: Mark Fisher
- Subject: Capitalist realism; neoliberalism; political theory; popular culture
- Genre: Political philosophy
- Publisher: Zero Books
- Publication date: 2009
- Pages: 81
- ISBN: 9781846943171
- OCLC: 1846943175

Capitalist Realism: Is There No Alternative? is a 2009 book by British philosopher Mark Fisher. It explores his concept of "capitalist realism", defined as "the widespread sense that not only is capitalism the only viable political and economic system, but also that it is now impossible even to imagine a coherent alternative to it."

The book, less than 90 pages in length, examines what Fisher sees as the far-reaching effects of neoliberal ideology on popular culture, work, education, and mental health in contemporary society. The subtitle refers to British Prime Minister Margaret Thatcher's pro-market slogan, "There is no alternative".

Capitalist Realism was generally overlooked when first published, but it became an unexpected success and influenced a range of writers.

== Definition ==
Capitalist realism (a play on the term "socialist realism") is an ideological framework for viewing capitalism and the sway it holds over politics, economics, and public thought. It is widely regarded as Fisher's most consequential idea. Through his writings and numerous interviews with political bloggers and theorists, he continually expounded on the idea.

According to Fisher, the quotation "it is easier to imagine an end to the world than an end to capitalism" (attributed to both Fredric Jameson and Slavoj Žižek) captures the essence of capitalist realism. It is the prevailing belief that capitalism is the only feasible economic system, and thus there can be no alternative:

Capitalist realism ... cannot be confined to art or to the quasi-propagandistic way in which advertising functions. It is more like a pervasive atmosphere, conditioning not only the production of culture but also the regulation of work and education, and acting as a kind of invisible barrier constraining thought and action.

Capitalist realism advances the notion of the "post-political", whereby the dissolution of the Soviet Union solidified the supremacy of capitalism, and removed the question of its replacement from any serious consideration. This altered political debate such that it operated solely inside the boundaries of the capitalist system. As a result, anti-capitalist movements shifted away from promoting alternative systems, and toward alleviating capitalism's worst effects.

Exponents of capitalist realism do not claim that capitalism is a perfect system, but instead that it is the only one which can operate in a manner compatible with human nature and economic law. The Atlantic characterized capitalist realism as a political sensibility that "free-market neoliberalism is broken but that there is no better alternative so we might as well embrace it." By promoting the belief that innate human desire is only compatible with capitalism, any other system not based on the personal accumulation of wealth and capital is seen as counter to human nature and, by extension, impossible to implement successfully.

== Book summary ==
The book opens with a meditation on Alfonso Cuarón's 2006 film Children of Men about a dystopia of childlessness, which Fisher suggests is "specific to late capitalism". He asks what happens when there is no future for the human race, "how long can a culture persist without the new? What happens if the young are no longer capable of producing surprises?" He says the film confirms the suspicion that the end is already here: "it could well be the case that the future harbors only reiteration and re-permutation. Could it be that there are no breaks, no 'shocks of the new' to come?"

In Fisher's view, capitalist realism has so captured public thought that anti-capitalist ideas no longer act as an antithesis to capitalism. Instead, "gestural anti-capitalism" (e.g., a villainous corporation in a Hollywood film) is deployed as a means of reinforcing capitalism. He believes that mass media and culture offer a safe outlet for surfacing anti-capitalist ideas without actually challenging the status quo. The lack of coherent alternatives, as presented through the lens of capitalist realism, leads many anti-capitalist movements to cease targeting the end of capitalism, but instead to seek reformist mitigations, often through individual consumption-based activities such as Product Red.

Fisher cites Jacques Lacan's distinction between "the Real" and "reality", in which "the Real is what any 'reality' must suppress". Using this terminology, Fisher equates 'reality' with capitalist realism, and 'the Real' with problems such as environmental catastrophe, worsening mental health, and corporate bureaucracy. He argues that capitalist realism both hides and co-opts these problems, and that "one strategy against capitalist realism could involve invoking the Real(s) underlying the reality that capitalism presents to us."

Fisher traces the emergence of capitalist realism to a purposeful push by the neoliberal right to transform public attitudes toward capitalism and, specifically, the post-Fordist form of capitalism that prevailed throughout the 1980s. The demise of the Soviet Union, which Fisher believes had represented the only example of a working non-capitalist system, was hailed as capitalism's decisive final victory and further validated capitalist realism. He adds that in the post-Soviet era, unchecked capitalism was able to reframe history into a narrative declaring that neoliberalism was the result of a natural progression of history and even embodied the culmination of human development.

With regard to public perceptions of capitalism, Fisher coins the term "reflexive impotence", which describes a phenomenon where people recognize the flawed nature of capitalism, but think that there are no means of effecting change. In his opinion, this inaction leads to a self-fulfilling prophecy as well as a negative toll on mental health.

Fisher writes that the bank bailouts after the 2008 financial crisis illustrated capitalist realism in action, claiming that the bailouts occurred largely because the notion of allowing the banking sector to fail was unimaginable to politicians and the general population. He attributes it to the influence of capitalist realism that such a failure was never considered an option; consequently, the neoliberal system survived. He classifies the state of capitalist realism in 2009 in the following terms:

The only powerful agents influencing politicians and managers in education are business interests. It's become far too easy to ignore workers and, partly because of this, workers feel increasingly helpless and impotent. The concerted attack on unions by neoliberal interest groups, together with the shift from a Fordist to a post-Fordist organisation of the economy – the move towards casualisation, just-in-time production, globalization – has eroded the power base of unions.

Fisher identifies a widespread desire for a public sphere and public spaces that operate outside of the state and are free from the harmful "add-ons of capital". He asserts, however, that it is the state alone which has been able to maintain a public sphere against the capitalist push for mass privatization. Neoliberal thought supports the destruction of the public sphere, disparagingly referred to as the "Nanny State", in favor of privatising institutions such as education and health, based on the assumption that the market best serves public needs. In this vein, he raises the idea of "business ontology", i.e., "the only goals and purposes which count are those that are translatable into business terms". In light of the 2008 crisis, he says that for public services to survive they must remove their business-oriented underpinnings, for if "even businesses can't be run as businesses, why should public services?"

The book ends on a somewhat hopeful note that "the long, dark night of the end of history" also presents an opportunity: "The very oppressive pervasiveness of capitalist realism means that even glimmers of alternative political and economic possibilities can have a disproportionately great effect. The tiniest event can tear a hole in the grey curtain of reaction which has marked the horizons of possibility under capitalist realism. From a situation in which nothing can happen, suddenly anything is possible again."

== Reception ==
When Capitalist Realism was published in 2009, it was met with "critical silence", as Lauren Kelly recalled in an April 2026 profile of Fisher: "Journalists and academics initially dismissed Mark Fisher's book, ignoring the cultural theorist's requests for coverage and interviews"; even the book's publisher, Zer0 Books, "lamented that it was unmarketable. Fisher, also prone to self-doubt, questioned the relevance of his thesis and the gravitas of his personal approach after attempting, and failing, to write a traditional systematic work of theory."

Over the next few years, the book enjoyed steadily growing sales. By 2017, more than 30,000 copies had been sold. As of December 2025, sales of English-language versions reached an estimated 250,000, with translations in nearly a dozen languages.

Coinciding with the increased sales, the book started to receive critical attention. In 2011, The Guardian called it "a brilliant, succinct ... analysis of the social, political and psychological structures in place today." The term "capitalist realism" began to appear more often in mainstream discourse, for example, in 2011 The Independent characterized Fisher's definition of the term as "the weary belief that 'nothing can be done' about capitalism". In 2018, Hua Hsu wrote in The New Yorker that Capitalist Realism had become a "cult favorite" due to Fisher's "relentless energy" and the book's "rousing call to arms". In Novara Media in 2023, Aaron Bastani labeled the book "the most important document the British left has produced so far this century. This isn't because of its conceptual originality ... but because it provides a popular register for the torpor at the heart of our political and social life."

In the wake of Fisher's work, other critical theorists in academia and the political blogosphere employed the concept of capitalist realism as a theoretical framework.

== See also ==
- Late capitalism
- Occupational burnout
- Socialist Patients' Collective, West German Marxist collective with motto "Turn illness into a weapon"
- Capitalism and Schizophrenia
