= Dystopia =

Community or society that is undesirable or frightening

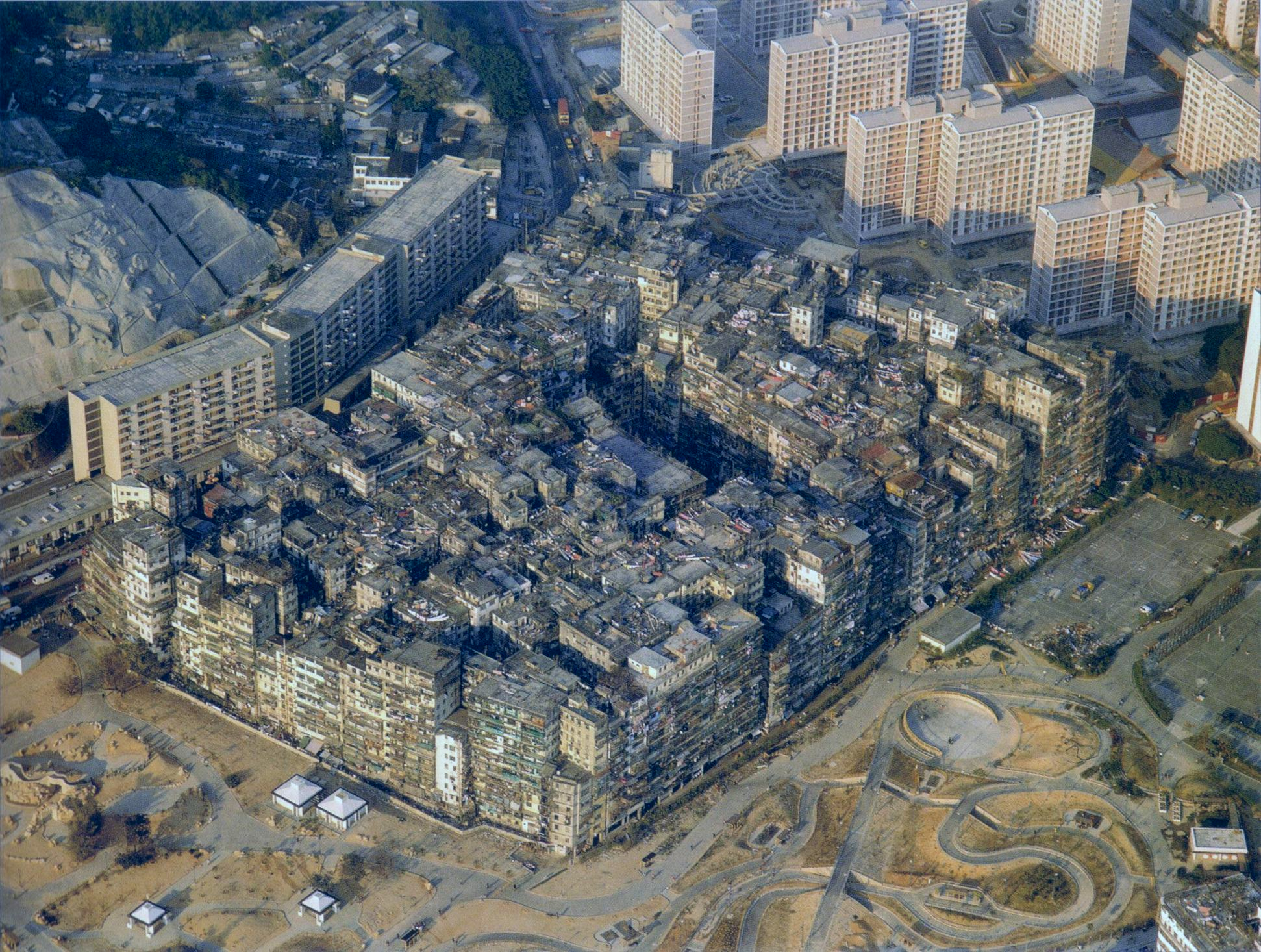
Life in Kowloon Walled City in British Hong Kong has often inspired the dystopian identity in modern media works.

A dystopia (lit. "bad place") is an imagined world or society in which people lead wretched, dehumanized, fearful lives. It is an imagined place (possibly state) in which everything is unpleasant or bad, typically a totalitarian or environmentally degraded one. Dystopia is widely seen as the opposite of utopia – a concept coined by Thomas More in 1516 to describe an ideal society. Both topias are common topics in fiction. Dystopia is also referred to as cacotopia.

Dystopias are often characterized by fear or distress, tyrannical governments, environmental disaster, or other characteristics associated with a cataclysmic decline in society. Themes typical of a dystopian society include complete control over the people in a society through the use of propaganda and police state tactics, heavy censorship of information or denial of free thought, worship of an unattainable goal, the complete loss of individuality, and heavy enforcement of conformity. Despite certain overlaps, dystopian fiction is distinct from post-apocalyptic fiction, and an undesirable society is not necessarily dystopian. Dystopian societies appear in many sub-genres of fiction and are often used to draw attention to society, environment, politics, economics, religion, psychology, ethics, science, or technology. Some authors use the term to refer to existing societies, many of which are, or have been, totalitarian states or societies in an advanced state of collapse. Dystopias, through an exaggerated worst-case scenario, often present a criticism of a current trend, societal norm, or political system.

== Etymology ==
"Dustopia", the original spelling of "dystopia", first appeared in Lewis Henry Younge's Utopia: or Apollo's Golden Days in 1747. Additionally, dystopia was used as an antonym for utopia by John Stuart Mill in one of his 1868 Parliamentary speeches (Hansard Commons) by adding the prefix "dys" (Ancient Greek: δυσ- "bad") to "topia" (Ancient Greek: τόπος, lit. 'place'), reinterpreting the initial "u" as the prefix "eu" (Ancient Greek: ευ- "good") instead of "ou" (Ancient Greek: οὐ "not"). It was used to denounce the government's Irish land policy: "It is, perhaps, too complimentary to call them Utopians, they ought rather to be called dys-topians, or caco-topians. What is commonly called Utopian is something too good to be practicable; but what they appear to favour is too bad to be practicable."

Decades before the first documented use of the word "dystopia" was "cacotopia"/"kakotopia" (using Ancient Greek: κακόs, "bad, wicked") originally proposed in 1818 by Jeremy Bentham: "As a match for utopia (or the imagined seat of the best government) suppose a cacotopia (or the imagined seat of the worst government) discovered and described." Though dystopia became the more popular term, cacotopia finds occasional use; Anthony Burgess, author of A Clockwork Orange (1962), said it was a better fit for Orwell's Nineteen Eighty-Four because "it sounds worse than dystopia".

== Theory ==
Some scholars, such as Gregory Claeys and Lyman Tower Sargent, make certain distinctions between typical synonyms of dystopias. For example, Claeys and Sargent define literary dystopias as societies imagined as substantially worse than the society in which the author writes. Some of these are anti-utopias, which criticize attempts to implement various concepts of utopia. In the most comprehensive treatment of the literary and real expressions of the concept, Dystopia: A Natural History, Claeys offers a historical approach to these definitions. Here, the tradition is traced from early reactions to the French Revolution. Its commonly anti-collectivist character is stressed, and the addition of other themes—the dangers of science and technology, of social inequality, of corporate dictatorship, of nuclear war—are also traced. A psychological approach is also favored here, with the principle of fear being identified with despotic forms of rule, carried forward from the history of political thought, and group psychology introduced as a means of understanding the relationship between utopia and dystopia. Andrew Norton-Schwartzbard noted that "written many centuries before the concept "dystopia" existed, Dante's Inferno in fact includes most of the typical characteristics associated with this genre – even if placed in a religious framework rather than in the future of the mundane world, as modern dystopias tend to be. In the same vein, Vicente Angeloti remarked that "George Orwell's emblematic phrase, a boot stamping on a human face – forever, would aptly describe the situation of the denizens in Dante's Hell. Conversely, Dante's famous inscription Abandon all hope, ye who enter here would have been equally appropriate if placed at the entrance to Orwell's "Ministry of Love" and its notorious "Room 101."

== Society ==
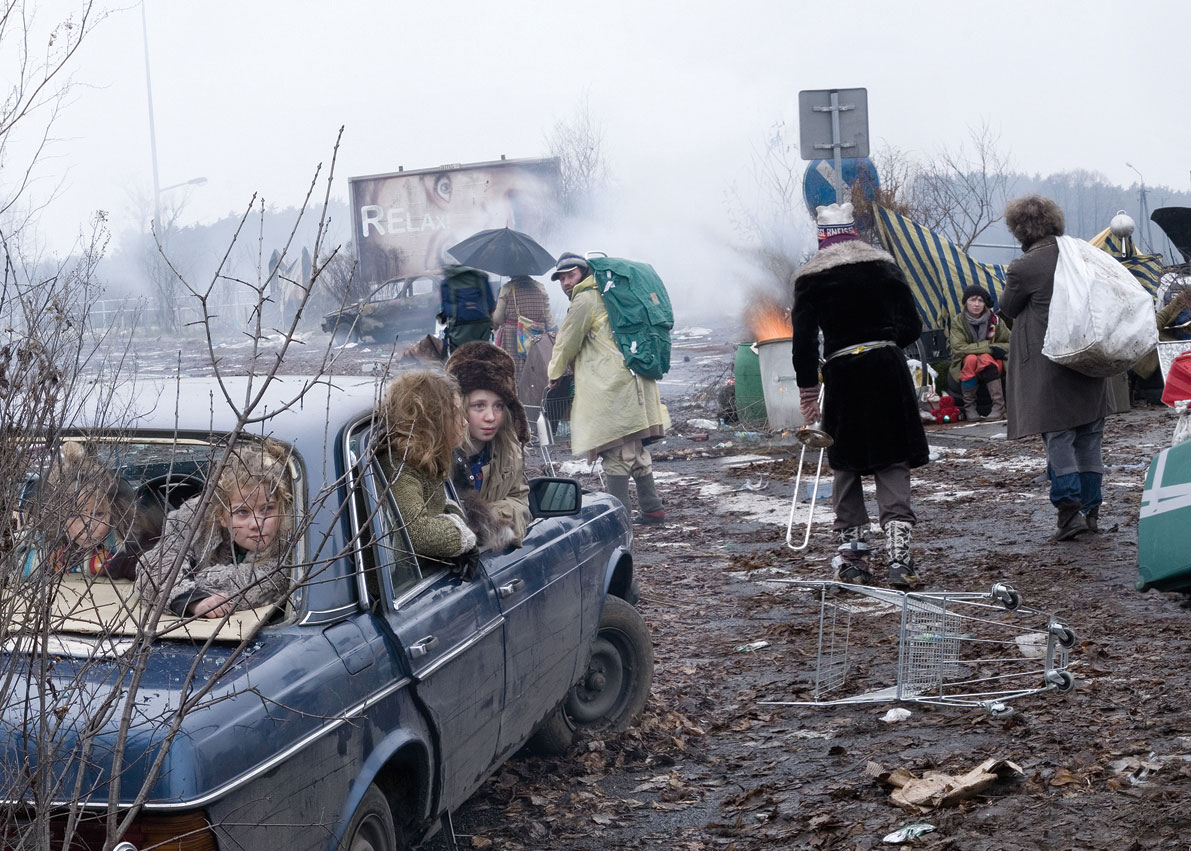
People Leaving the Cities, photo art by Zbigniew Libera, which imagines a dystopian future in which people have to leave dying metropolises

Dystopias typically reflect contemporary sociopolitical realities and extrapolate worst-case scenarios as warnings for necessary social change or caution. Dystopian fictions invariably reflect the concerns and fears of their creators' contemporaneous culture. Due to this, they can be considered a subject of social studies. In dystopias, citizens may live in a dehumanized state, be under constant surveillance, or have a fear of the outside world. In the film What Happened to Monday the protagonists (identical septuplet sisters) risk their lives by taking turns onto the outside world because of a one-child policy in place in this futuristic dystopian society.

In a 1967 study, Frank Kermode suggests that the failure of religious prophecies led to a shift in how society apprehends this ancient mode. Christopher Schmidt notes that, while the world goes to waste for future generations, people distract themselves from disaster by passively watching it as entertainment.

In the 2010s, there was a surge of popular dystopian young adult literature and blockbuster films. Some have commented on this trend, saying that "it is easier to imagine the end of the world than it is to imagine the end of capitalism". Cultural theorist and critic Mark Fisher identified the phrase as encompassing the theory of capitalist realism—the perceived "widespread sense that not only is capitalism the only viable political and economic system, but also that it is now impossible even to imagine a coherent alternative to it"—and used the above quote as the title to the opening chapter of his book, Capitalist Realism: Is There No Alternative?. In the book, he also refers to dystopian film such as Children of Men (originally a novel by P. D. James) to illustrate what he describes as the "slow cancellation of the future". Theo James, an actor in Divergent (originally a novel by Veronica Roth), explains that "young people in particular have such a fascination with this kind of story [...] It's becoming part of the consciousness. You grow up in a world where it's part of the conversation all the time–the statistics of our planet warming up. The environment is changing. The weather is different. These are things that are very visceral and very obvious, and they make you question the future, and how we will survive. It's so much a part of everyday life that young people inevitably – consciously or not – are questioning their futures and how the Earth will be. I certainly do. I wonder what kind of world my children's kids will live in."

The substantial sub-genre of alternative history works depicting a world in which Nazi Germany won the Second World War can be considered as dystopias. So can other works of Alternative History, in which a historical turning point led to a manifestly repressive world. For example, the 2004 mockumentary C.S.A.: The Confederate States of America, and Ben Winters' Underground Airlines, in which slavery in the United States continues to the present, with "electronic slave auctions" carried out via the Internet and slaves controlled by electronic devices implanted in their spines; or Keith Roberts' Pavane in which 20th-Century Britain is ruled by a Catholic theocracy and the Inquisition is actively torturing and burning "heretics".

== Common themes ==
=== Politics ===
In When the Sleeper Wakes, H. G. Wells depicted the governing class as hedonistic and shallow. George Orwell contrasted Wells's world to that depicted in Jack London's The Iron Heel, where the dystopian rulers are brutal and dedicated to the point of fanaticism, which Orwell considered more plausible.

The political principles at the root of fictional utopias (or "perfect worlds") are idealistic in principle and result in positive consequences for the inhabitants; the political principles on which fictional dystopias are based, while often based on utopian ideals, result in negative consequences for inhabitants because of at least one fatal flaw.

Dystopias are often filled with pessimistic views of the ruling class or a government that is brutal or uncaring and rules with an 'iron fist'. Dystopian governments are sometimes ruled by a fascist regime or dictators. These dystopian government establishments often have protagonists or groups that lead a "resistance" to enact change within their society, as seen in Alan Moore's V for Vendetta.

=== Economics ===
The economic structures of dystopian societies in literature and other media have many variations, as the economy often directly relates to the elements depicted by the writer as the source of the oppression. There are several archetypes that these societies tend to follow. One theme is the dichotomy of planned economies versus free market economies, a conflict which is found in such works as Ayn Rand's Anthem and Henry Kuttner's short story "The Iron Standard". Another example is Norman Jewison's 1975 film Rollerball.

Some dystopias, such as that of Nineteen Eighty-Four, feature black markets with goods that are dangerous and difficult to obtain or the characters may be at the mercy of the state-controlled economy. Kurt Vonnegut's Player Piano depicts a dystopia in which the centrally controlled economic system has indeed made material abundance plentiful, but deprived the mass of humanity of meaningful labor; virtually all work is menial and unsatisfying, with only a small number of the group that achieves education being admitted to the elite and its work. In Tanith Lee's Don't Bite the Sun, there is no want of any kind – only unabashed consumption and hedonism, leading the protagonist to begin looking for a deeper meaning to existence. Even in dystopias where the economic system is not the source of the society's flaws, as in Brave New World, the state often controls the economy. A character, reacting with horror to the suggestion of not being part of the social body, cites as a reason that it works for everyone else.

=== Class ===
Dystopian fiction frequently draws stark contrasts between the privileges of the ruling class and the dreary existence of the working class. In Aldous Huxley's 1931 novel Brave New World, a class system is prenatally determined, with Alphas, Betas, Gammas, Deltas, and Epsilons. The lower classes have reduced brain function and are specially conditioned to be satisfied with their position in life. Outside of this society, several human settlements exist in the conventional way, but the World Government describes them as 'savages.'

In George Orwell's Nineteen Eighty-Four, the dystopian society features a tiered class structure: the ruling elite, the 'Inner Party,' at the top; the 'Outer Party' below them, functioning as a type of middle class with minor privileges; and the working-class proletariat at the bottom of the hierarchy, with few rights, yet making up the vast majority of the population.

In the film Elysium, the majority of Earth's surface population lives in poverty, with little access to health care, and is subjected to worker exploitation and police brutality. Meanwhile, the wealthy live above Earth in luxury, with access to technologies that cure all diseases, reverse aging, and regenerate body parts.

Written a century earlier, the future society depicted in H. G. Wells' The Time Machine had started in a similar way to Elysium – with workers consigned to living and working in underground tunnels while the wealthy live on a surface transformed into a beautiful garden. However, over a long period, the roles were eventually reversed—the rich degenerated and became decadent 'livestock,' regularly caught and eaten by the underground cannibal Morlocks.

=== Family ===
Some fictional dystopias, such as Brave New World and Fahrenheit 451, have eradicated the family and prevented it from re-establishing itself as a social institution. In Brave New World, where children are artificially reproduced, the concepts of "mother" and "father" are considered obscene. In some novels, such as We, the state is hostile to motherhood, as a pregnant woman from One State rebels.

=== Religion ===
In dystopias, religious groups may play the role of oppressed or oppressor. One of the earliest examples is Robert Hugh Benson's Lord of the World, about a futuristic world where Marxists and Freemasons led by the Antichrist have taken over the world and the only remaining source of dissent is a tiny and persecuted Catholic minority. In Brave New World, the establishment of the state involved lopping off the tops of all crosses (symbols of Christianity) to make them 'T's (symbols of Henry Ford's Model T).

In C. S. Lewis's That Hideous Strength, the leaders of the fictional National Institute of Coordinated Experiments—an academic and governmental joint venture promoting an anti-traditionalist social agenda—are contemptuous of religion and require initiates to desecrate Christian symbols. Margaret Atwood's novel The Handmaid's Tale is set in a future United States under a Christian-based theocratic regime.

=== Identity ===
In the Russian novel We by Yevgeny Zamyatin, first published in 1921, people are permitted to live out of public view twice a week for one hour and are referred to only by numbers instead of names.

The latter feature also appears in the film THX 1138. In some dystopian works, such as Kurt Vonnegut's Harrison Bergeron, society forces individuals to conform to radical egalitarian social norms that discourage or suppress accomplishment, even competence, as forms of inequality. Complete conformity and suppression of individuality (to the point of acting in unison) are also depicted in Madeleine L'Engle's A Wrinkle in Time.

=== Violence ===
Violence is prevalent in many dystopias, often in the form of war, but also in urban crimes led by (predominantly teenage) gangs (e.g., A Clockwork Orange), or rampant crime met with blood sports (e.g. Battle Royale, The Running Man, The Hunger Games, Divergent, and The Purge). It is also explained in Suzanne Berne's essay "Ground Zero", where she explains her experience of the aftermath of 11 September 2001.

=== Nature ===
Fictional dystopias are commonly urban and frequently isolate their characters from all contact with the natural world. Sometimes they require their characters to avoid nature, as when walks are regarded as dangerously anti-social in Ray Bradbury's Fahrenheit 451, as well as in his short story "The Pedestrian". In That Hideous Strength, science coordinated by the government is directed toward the control of nature and the elimination of natural human instincts. In Brave New World, the lower class is conditioned to be afraid of nature but encouraged to visit the countryside and consume transport and games to promote economic activity. Lois Lowry's "The Giver" shows a society where technology and the desire to create a utopia have led humanity to enforce climate control on the environment, as well as to eliminate many undomesticated species and to provide psychological and pharmaceutical repellent against human instincts. E. M. Forster's "The Machine Stops" depicts a dramatically altered global environment which forces people to live underground due to an atmospheric contamination. As Angel Galdon-Rodriguez points out, this kind of isolation caused by external toxic hazard is later used by Hugh Howey in his series of dystopias of the Silo Series.

Excessive pollution that destroys nature is common in many dystopian films, such as The Matrix, RoboCop, WALL-E, April and the Extraordinary World and Soylent Green, as well as in video games like Cyberpunk 2077 and Half-Life 2. A few "green" fictional dystopias do exist, such as in Michael Carson's short story "The Punishment of Luxury" and Russell Hoban's Riddley Walker. The latter is set in the aftermath of nuclear war, "a post-nuclear holocaust Kent, where technology has been reduced to the level of the Iron Age".

=== Science and technology ===
Contrary to the technologically utopian claims, which view technology as a beneficial addition to all aspects of humanity, technological dystopia concerns itself with and focuses largely (but not always) on the negative effects caused by new technology.

== Dystopia in culture ==
- List of dystopian literature
- List of dystopian films
- List of dystopian TV programs
