= Dawn Foster =

Irish-Welsh journalist (1986–2021)

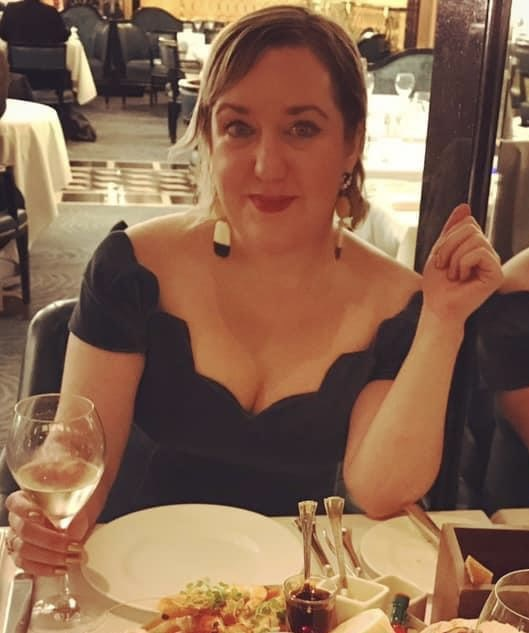
- Foster in 2018
- Born: Dawn Hayley Foster; 12 September 1986; Newport, Wales
- Died: 9 July 2021 (aged 34); London, England
- Education: University of Warwick (BA)
- Occupations: Writer, broadcaster

Dawn Hayley Foster (12 September 1986 – 9 July 2021) was an Irish-British journalist, broadcaster, and author writing predominantly on social affairs, politics, economics and women's rights. Foster held staff writer positions at Inside Housing, The Guardian, and Jacobin magazine, and contributed to other journals such as The Independent, The New York Times, Tribune, and Dissent. She regularly appeared as a political commentator on television and was known for her coverage of the Grenfell Tower fire.

== Early life and education ==
Foster was born in and grew up in Newport, South Wales. She also had a background in Belfast and held dual British and Irish citizenship. In articles for Child Poverty Action Group and The Guardian, she wrote that she grew up in poverty in an unemployed family. In 2017, Foster detailed early experiences of hunger and sleeping rough for the Food Memory Bank project.

She attended Caerleon Comprehensive School and Bassaleg High School before going on to study English literature at the University of Warwick. Before going into journalism, Foster worked in politics and higher education.

== Journalism ==
Foster held staff writer positions at Inside Housing, The Guardian, and Jacobin magazine. She was co-editor of openDemocracy 50:50 and wrote for numerous publications including The New York Times, Tribune, and the London Review of Books.

=== The Guardian ===
The success of Foster's blog on the harassment of female cyclists led to her first commission at The Guardian in 2010. In 2011, Foster was appointed as a moderator on The Guardian Comment is Free website and became a regular contributor to its opinion section.

Foster's career at The Guardian continued with regular columns including Foster on Friday for the Housing Network, opinion columns, and her work for The Guardian's Society desk. Her work at The Guardian predominantly covered social affairs, politics, economics and women's rights. Her tenure at The Guardian came to an end in mid-2019 after she wrote an opinion piece criticising then deputy leader of the Labour Party Tom Watson and suggesting he should quit.

=== Inside Housing ===
After working on The Guardian's comment moderation desk and writing opinion, Foster worked as deputy features editor at Inside Housing from 2014 to 2015. Her work there includes reports into hoarding, interviews with social geographer Danny Dorling and Welsh politician Tanni Grey-Thompson, and investigations into how periods impact homeless women.

Inside Housing colleagues described Foster as "brave and bold" and a "brilliant journalist."

It was during Foster's role at Inside Housing that International Building Press organisation named her 2014's IBP new journalist of the year.

=== London Review of Books letter to Toby Young ===
In 2015, the London Review of Books' cover story for its 7 May issue was an article written by Foster criticising the free school movement. In it, Foster wrote: "There is no requirement that free school founders have experience of running a school, and no assessment is made as to whether the prospective founders will be able to meet the legally required standards of school governance." The article drew criticism from free schools advocate and journalist Toby Young. In a letter to the London Review of Books, Young took issue with Foster's interpretation of free schools data and made claims that were challenged by the author Michael Rosen, journalist Melissa Benn, and education researcher Janet Downs in further letters written to the publication. Foster responded to Young in the London Review of Books' Letters refuting Young's criticism and wrote:

Creaming off the children of more affluent parents constitutes social segregation; so too does the existence of religious free schools. Young seems to think he is held in high regard by free school advocates. When I mentioned his name in the course of interviewing a former Department for Education employee for the piece, my interviewee headbutted the restaurant table in exasperation. I have found the sentiment, if not the gesture, to be common among his ideological comrades.

=== Grenfell Tower fire ===
On the night of the Grenfell Tower fire, "[Foster] headed over to do what she could as Grenfell Tower was engulfed in flames, and went on to unearth a blog post written by former residents of the tower warning that the recent refurbishment could cause a 'serious fire'." Her coverage of the fire included an opinion piece in The New York Times, in which she wrote the following:

"the level of public anger right now since the Grenfell disaster is forcing people here to confront the issues of class and race, gentrification and public policy that, it is now clear, can be deadly."

On the day of the fire, Jacobin magazine published an article by Foster on the fire. She called the tragedy an "atrocity" that "was explicitly political" and "a symbol of the United Kingdom's deep inequality".

A tribute to Foster by the writer Juliet Jacques wrote that Foster, "reported on [the Grenfell Tower fire] relentlessly, criticising the way the building's management company and the local council had ignored the residents' concerns".

One year on from the Grenfell fire, Foster discussed the political aftermath and the survivors' struggle for justice with writer and editor James Butler on Novara Media.

=== 2018 Conservative Party Conference ===
Whilst attending the 2018 Conservative party conference, Foster uncovered an oversight in the event's mobile app that allowed any user to access personal details and phone numbers of attendees including Boris Johnson and senior members of Theresa May's cabinet. The story went viral online and resulted in an apology and investigation from the Information Commissioner.

=== Criticism of an MP's use of the phrase "Cultural Marxism" ===
In 2019, the Conservative Member of Parliament, Suella Braverman, said in a pro-Brexit speech for the Bruges Group (a Eurosceptic think tank): "We are engaged in a war against cultural Marxism" and warned about free speech at universities in the UK. Journalists present at the event included Foster who challenged Braverman's use of the term 'cultural Marxism' highlighting its anti-Semitic history and its connection to the manifesto of mass murderer Anders Breivik. Braverman responded, "Yes, I do believe that we are in a fight against cultural Marxism. We have a culture evolving from the far left which is about snuffing out freedom of speech." Braverman's usage of the conspiracy theory was condemned as hate speech by other MPs, such as Wes Streeting, and the anti-racist organisation Hope Not Hate.

=== Support of transgender rights ===
Foster wrote numerous articles against transphobia in British media and was one of more than 200 feminists who signed a letter to The Guardian in 2020 rejecting the argument that transgender rights are a threat to women.

In 2019, Foster criticised anti-transgender activist Graham Linehan and others who allegedly engaged in targeted harassment of an NSPCC employee after the charity hired British model and activist Munroe Bergdorf, a transgender woman. Foster called the online abuse "transphobic" and "flatly homophobic".

In 2020, Foster received transphobic emails and threats for her support of the transgender rights movement. Foster told PinkNews:

"It's been awful to see the rhetoric around trans issues dragged back to the 80s by a handful of obsessive, middle-class newspaper columnists, the bloke who wrote Father Ted and then failed to be funny ever again, cheered on by internet-obsessed women on Mumsnet."

=== Ireland ===
Foster often wrote and made commentary on Irish politics and social issues, particularly those concerning Northern Ireland. A believer in Irish reunification, she attended Sinn Féin public meetings. She was described as "one of the few working-journalists in Britain who intimately understood Ireland" in An Phoblacht.

== Media appearances ==
=== Television ===
Foster made regular appearances as a political commentator on television including Sky News, Channel 4 News, BBC News, and Newsnight.

=== Radio and podcasts ===
Foster also regularly appeared on radio and podcasts in Britain and America. She was a frequent guest on Novara Media and made appearances to discuss austerity, politics, and housing in Britain. Between 2020 and 2021, Foster also appeared on talkRADIO.

In 2017, Foster appeared on The Independent's Double Take podcast to discuss solutions to Britain's housing emergency.

In 2020, the London Review Bookshop podcast released a conversation between Foster and the author Lynsey Hanley discussing Hanley's book Estates. Hanley and Foster also discussed class in an episode released in 2016. Other appearances on the London Review Bookshop podcast include Foster's 2017 conversation with the American poet and author Patricia Lockwood.

=== Recorded panels ===
Recordings of Foster's appearances at The World Transformed include a 2016 panel titled "Building a Radical Media" and a 2018 panel titled "Tribune: the relaunch", organised by Tribune magazine.

In 2016, Foster took part in the Fawcett Society's 150th anniversary celebrations on a panel discussing feminism.

== Books ==
=== Lean Out ===
Foster's first book, Lean Out, was published in January 2016 by Repeater Books. In Foster's obituary in The Guardian Lean Out was described as "a rebuttal of Sheryl Sandberg's argument that corporate women could succeed by 'leaning in' to their careers, it skewered what Dawn called the 'self help' approach of corporate feminism."

In January 2016, Foster was interviewed about Lean Out's politics by The Huffington Post. In it she discussed the book's response to Lean In: Women, Work, and the Will to Lead, a 2013 book co-written by Sheryl Sandberg, the chief operating officer of Facebook, and Nell Scovell, a TV and magazine writer. In the interview, Foster said.

"the only reason that Sandberg's life is at all possible is because she employs low-paid women to clean her house, do the grocery shopping, look after her children, run her finances... and her advice wouldn't help those women at all."

Foster further discussed her criticism of Lean In and liberal feminism with The Huffington Post:

"The book assumes that women always work in the interests of women, but people aren't male and female and that's it. If Theresa May is a white woman who is very well-educated and very wealthy, she's more likely to act in the interests of, say, a very wealthy white man than she is a working class poor black or immigrant woman."

In March 2016, Foster discussed the book with openDemocracy in a recorded interview titled, "Is capitalism destroying feminism?"

Further promotion of Lean Out included a discussion with Zoe Williams at the London Review Bookshop in February 2016. Foster also discussed the book on Novara Media. On 21 September 2018, Foster took part in a three-person panel discussion of Sandberg's book.

==== Reception ====
Social geographer Danny Dorling wrote, "Rarely does 'essential reading' really mean that you urgently need to read a book. But Lean Out is different." The Independent on Sunday called Lean Out, "A very important, much-needed and well-researched book that isn't afraid to ask the right questions and demand answers. It is a straight-talking, timely call to arms." In Times Higher Education, writer and academic Shahidha Bari wrote that the book was, "Vigorous...trenchant...a robust critique...its conclusion is both inevitable and startling." The Huffington Post wrote that it was, "Fascinating, thought-provoking and at times outrage-inducing."

In 2017, Lean Out was shortlisted for the Bread and Roses book award.

=== Incomplete works ===
According to Foster's obituary in The Guardian, she had been working on a second book, Where Will We Live?, about the history of and solutions to the housing crisis: she had one chapter left to write before being sidelined by illness. According to her biography in the London Review of Books, she was working on another book, a cultural history of the dole.

== Personal life ==
As a child, Foster practised Taekwondo.

At the end of her life, Foster was based in South West London. She was a Roman Catholic. In 2019, Foster wrote in The Guardian about rediscovering her faith after speaking to survivors of the Grenfell Tower fire.

Foster's volunteer work included the Christmases she spent volunteering for homeless charities with ties to her church.

Foster had epilepsy and schwannomatosis, and wrote about her experience of disabilities and disability rights.

== Death ==
Foster's friends and colleagues announced her death on 15 July 2021, at the age of 34. Foster had been discharged from hospital on 9 July and was found in her home, having died suddenly of complications related to her long-term health problems.

Tributes were paid by fellow political commentators and journalists on social media as well as a number of politicians, including Jeremy Corbyn, Mary Lou McDonald, Angela Rayner, and John McDonnell.

== Legacy ==
In July 2021, South Wales Argus reported on a fundraiser for a memorial bench for Foster in Newport.

=== Housmans bookshop ===
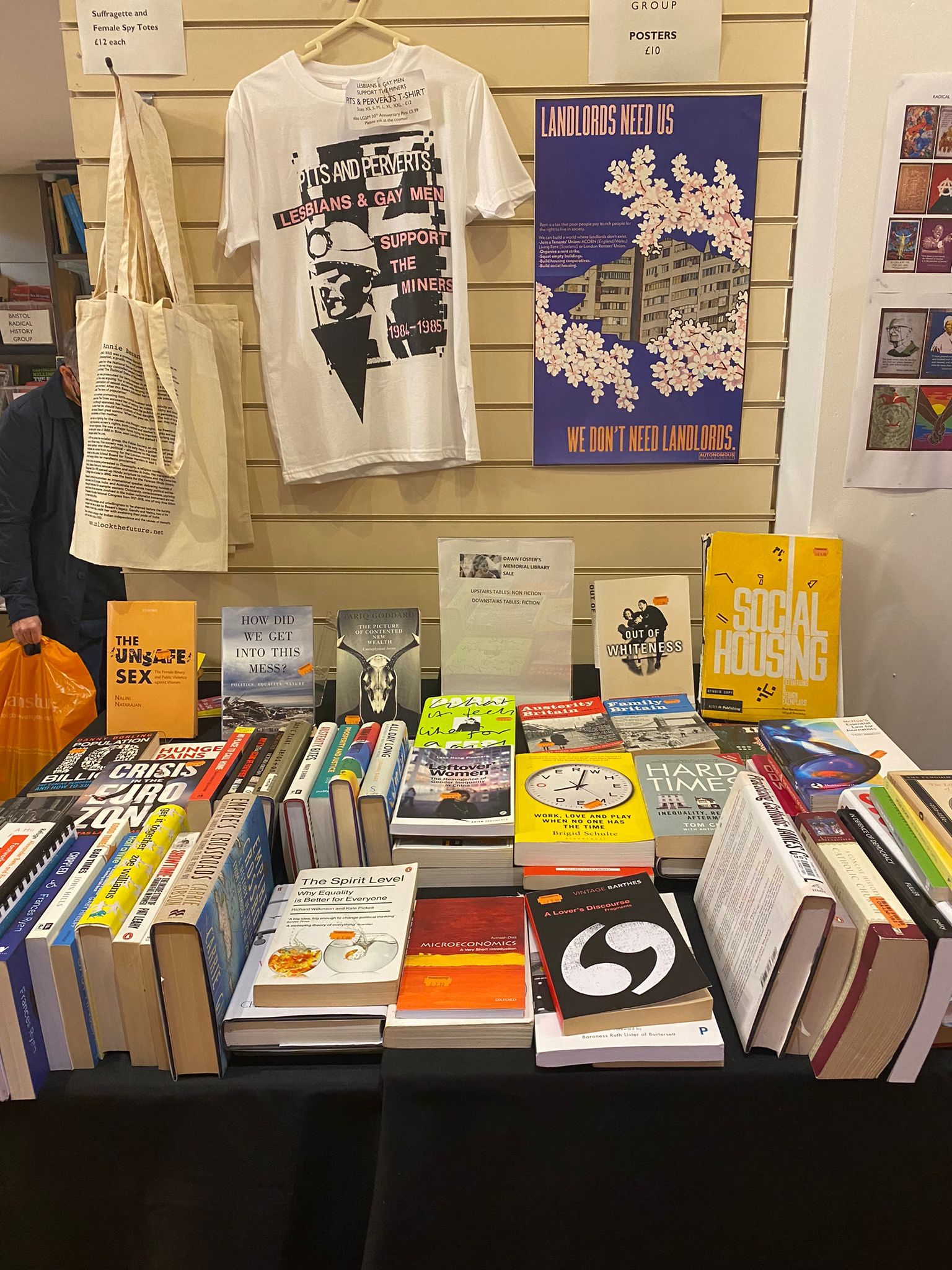
Some of Dawn Foster's books at the Housman's memorial sale.

In October 2021, the radical, London-based bookshop Housmans announced that Foster's private library had been donated to the bookshop by Foster's next of kin. Each book was stamped with the imprint "DAWN FOSTER FOREVER – From the library of Dawn Foster 1986–2021."

=== Dawn Foster Memorial Essay Prize ===
In November 2021, the Dawn Foster Memorial Essay Prize was launched in her memory by HCI Skills Gateway in partnership with Red Pepper magazine. In 2022, this prize was awarded to Jessica Field's essay on #SaveOurHomesLS26: a resident action group in Leeds campaigning to save their prefabricated tenanted homes. The winning essay and the shortlisted entries were published by Red Pepper magazine.

== Bibliography ==
- Lean Out Repeater Books, 2016.ISBN 9781910924020

== Awards and influence ==
- The International Building Press Prize for Young Journalist of the Year, 2014.
- Non-traditional journalist of the year, Words by Women awards, 2016.
- Shortlisted for Scoop of the Year, The International Building Press Prize, 2016.
- Longlisted for the Orwell Prize for Exposing Britain's Social Evils, 2017.
- Shortlisted for the Bread and Roses Award, 2017.
- Number 82 in "The 100 Most Influential People on the Left" by political commentator Iain Dale, 2017.
- One of the most respected journalists by journalists in the Journalists at Work survey by the National Council for the Training of Journalists, 2018.
