= Compass Books =

Compass Books may refer to:

- An imprint of Viking Press in the 1950s-1960s
- An imprint of John Hunt Publishing after 2001
