= Claire Cronin =

Claire Cronin may refer to:

- Claire Cronin (singer-songwriter), singer-songwriter and author
- Claire Cronin (camogie), Irish camogie player
- Claire D. Cronin, US Ambassador to Ireland and former member of the Massachusetts House of Representatives
