= Tariq Goddard =

British novelist and publisher (born 1975)

Tariq Goddard (born 1975) is a British novelist and publisher. He has written seven novels, the first of which Homage to a Firing Squad, was short-listed for the Whitbread Book Award for First Novel. He founded, and was the publisher of the independent publishing companies Zero Books and Repeater Books.

== Life and career ==
Goddard was born in London and read philosophy at King's College, London, and Continental Philosophy at the University of Warwick and the University of Surrey. In 2002 his first novel, Homage to a Firing Squad, was nominated for the Whitbread (Costa) Book Award for First Novel. It was also nominated for the Bollinger Everyman Wodehouse Prize literary award for comic literature. He was included as one of Waterstones' 'Faces of the Future' and the novel, whose film rights where sold, was listed as one of The Observer's Four Debuts of the year.

In 2003 his second novel, Dynamo, was cited as one of the ten best sports novels of all time by The Observer Sports Magazine. The Morning Rides Behind Us, his third novel, was released in 2005, and short-listed for the Commonwealth Writers Prize for Fiction. In 2010 The Picture of Contented New Wealth, his fourth novel, won The Independent Publishers Award for Horror Writing and he was awarded a development grant by The Royal Literary Fund. The Message, published in 2011 and set in a fictional African state, received Silver at the 2012 Independent Publishers Award for Literary Fiction. His sixth novel Nature and Necessity was published in 2017. The Repeater Book of the Occult, edited by Tariq Goddard and “horror philosopher” Eugene Thacker, was published in 2021. His seventh novel High John the Conqueror was published in 2022.

In 2007 Goddard founded Zer0 Books in collaboration with Mark Fisher with the intention of publishing works that were "intellectual without being academic, and popular without being populist". Amongst others, Zer0 published bestselling works by Fisher, Eugene Thacker and Owen Hatherley. He was the Publisher for Zero Books from 2007-2014 and again from 2021-2024.

In 2014 he and his co-founders left Zero Books and started Repeater Books. The brand's strapline “we’re alive and we don’t agree” is taken from the imprint’s mission statement, which described the imprint’s aim to gather together isolated voices from across the political left and the counterculture in every sphere and genre. Goddard left Repeater Books and Zero Books in 2024, stating that "Repeater and Zero Books are publishing imprints that have become a culture. That culture will endure longer than the individuals that helped bring it about, and although I will be leaving the imprints, it is impossible to leave what they have created."

Goddard is also a frequent contributor to The Quietus, writing reviews of artists such as Grinderman and Current 93, editorial tributes to the singers Shane MacGowan and Mark Stewart, and on the importance of music journalism. He was shortlisted for the 2020 IMJA Music Journalism Award.

He lives on a farm in Wiltshire with his wife and has three children.

== Bibliography ==
- Homage to a Firing Squad. Sceptre Books, 2003. ISBN 978-0340821473.
- Dynamo. Sceptre Books, 2004. ISBN 978-0340821497.
- The Morning Rides Behind Us. Sceptre Books, 2006. ISBN 978-0340832028.
- The Message. Zero Books, 2011. ISBN 978-1846948794.
- The Picture of Contented New Wealth: A Metaphysical Horror. Zero Books, 2009. ISBN 978-1846942709.
- Nature and Necessity. Repeater Books, 2017. ISBN 978-1910924440.
- The Repeater Book of the Occult. Edited with Eugene Thacker. Repeater Books, 2021. ISBN 978-1913462079.
- The Repeater Book of Heroism. Edited with Alex Niven. Repeater Books, 2022. ISBN 978-1914420023.
- High John the Conqueror. Repeater Books, 2022. ISBN 978-1914420306.
