= The Folk Singers and the Bureau =

Book about musicians, CPUSA, and the FBI

The Folk Singers and the Bureau: The FBI, the Folk Artists and the Suppression of the Communist Party, USA-1939-1956
- Author: Aaron J. Leonard
- Language: English
- Subjects: American folk music; History of the FBI; History of the Communist Party USA
- Genre: Historical Nonfiction
- Published: September 8, 2020
- Publisher: Repeater Books
- Publication place: United States of America
- Pages: 323
- ISBN: 1-913-46200-5
- Website: repeaterbooks.com/product/the-folk-singers-and-the-bureau-the-fbi-the-folk-artists-and-the-suppression-of-the-communist-party-usa-1939-1956/

The Folk Singers and the Bureau: The FBI, the Folk Artists and the Suppression of the Communist Party, USA-1939-1956 is a book written by Aaron Leonard.

== Background ==
The book focuses on musicians such as Pete Seeger, Woody Guthrie, Lee Hays, and Josh White who associated with the Communist Party of the United States of America (CPUSA) as well as musicians such as Burl Ives and Oscar Brand who later turned on the party and its members. The 323 page book was written by Aaron J. Leonard and published by Repeater Books on September 8, 2020 in London, England. The Federal Bureau of Investigation (FBI) was invested in close surveillance of the CPUSA and people associated with the party, especially after the 1939 Molotov–Ribbentrop Pact and throughout the era of McCarthyism. Leonard used the FBI's archives of surveillance data as source material for the book, which included a file on Pete Seeger that was more than 5,800 pages long. Gustavus Stadler's book, Woody Guthrie: An Intimate Life, suggested that perhaps FBI surveillance of Woody Guthrie stopped when he was diagnosed with Huntington's Chorea and admitted to the Brooklyn State Hospital in 1955, but Leonard's research found that the surveillance continued.
