= Purity test (disambiguation) =

A purity test is a self-graded survey assessing one's participation in vices.

Purity test may also refer to:

- Purity test (politics), a standard used to determine in-group and out-group
- Metallurgical assay, the process of testing the purity of a metal
- Seed testing, the percentage of seed described on the label that is actually found in the quantity of seed
