= Unspeakable Things =

2014 book by Laurie Penny

Unspeakable Things: Sex, Lies and Revolution
- Cover of the first edition
- Author: Laurie Penny
- Language: English
- Subject: Feminism, Consumerism, Capitalism
- Published: London
- Publisher: Bloomsbury
- Publication date: 2014
- Publication place: United Kingdom
- Media type: Print
- Pages: 267
- ISBN: 9781408857694
- Dewey Decimal: 305.42
- Preceded by: Meat Market: Female Flesh Under Capitalism

Unspeakable Things: Sex, Lies and Revolution is a 2014 book by British journalist, author and political activist Laurie Penny.

== Background ==
The book is critical of neoliberalism and capitalism, and an account of gender politics and fiscal austerity. Penny also writes about her own struggles with an eating disorder, her career in journalism and experiences in activism and the British underground. In addition, the book discusses misogyny and political organisation on the internet, protest, poverty, feminist hostility towards sex workers, sexual freedom and the failure of the Occupy movement.

== Reception ==
In The Guardian, journalist Gaby Hinsliff praised the writing style and noted "for all her contradictions and irritatingly sweeping generalisations, when she's right she is very right" and "you find yourself nodding too many times to ignore it: when she explores the media's obsession with 'fucked up white girls, beautiful broken dollies, unable to cope with the freedom and the opportunities they've inherited'.

In The Independent the book received a strongly critical review by Daisy Wyatt. Wyatt criticised the book for being "provocative" and "dramatic" and condemned Penny for including too much personal information, such as writing about being caught masturbating, losing her virginity, and a section in the book in which Penny notes "she has slept with numerous nerdy male activists, and some women – sometimes with both at the same time". According to Wyatt, "the transitions between passages from her personal life and polemics about sexual submission are often very abrupt...After a visceral passage about women's fertility still being seen as a sin against market forces, we cut straight to a first-person diary entry about flirting with a Catholic pro-lifer at a protest in Dublin." Wyatt also writes that for all Penny's "many encounters with the male sex, men are continually disparaged, criticised and blamed throughout the book", with Penny writing that men are "socially conditioned to behave like arseholes".

The book received media attention in Australia, Ireland, the United States and elsewhere. The book was Shortlisted for The Green Carnation Prize 2014.
