= Christiana Spens =

Writer and Illustrator

- Education: University of Cambridge, University of St. Andrews
- Occupation: Author
- Writing career
- Language: English

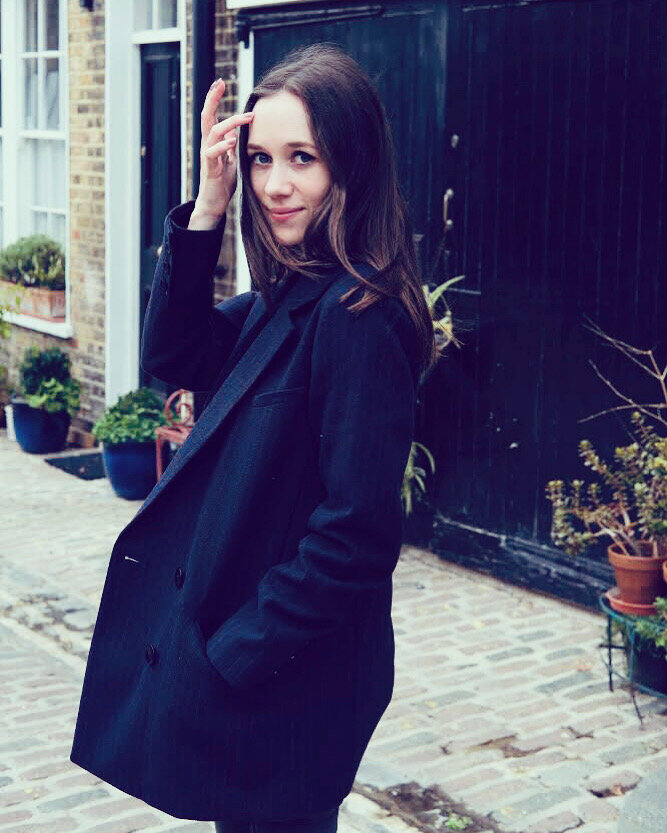
Christiana Spens

Christiana Spens is a writer and academic.

== Biography ==
Christiana Spens was born in Melbourne, Australia and grew up in Fife, Scotland. She was educated at the University of Cambridge in Philosophy, followed by the University of St. Andrews for her master's degree and doctorate. She is the author of The Fear (Repeater Books, 2023), The Portrayal and Punishment of Terrorists in Western Media (Palgrave Macmillan, 2019), and Shooting Hipsters: Rethinking Dissent in the Age of PR (Repeater Books, 2017). Her academic work looks at terrorism, ritual, visuality and Neo-orientalism. She has written for The New Statesman, The Irish Times, Byline Times, Glamour, Stylist, Prospect Magazine, Studio International and The Quietus on culture, psychology and politics.

== Publications ==
- Shooting Hipsters: Rethinking Dissent in the Age of PR, 2016
- The Portrayal and Punishment of Terrorists in Western Media : Playing the Villain, 2019
- The Fear, 2023
