= All Eyes on Rafah =

Pro-Palestinian slogan and viral post regarding the Rafah offensive

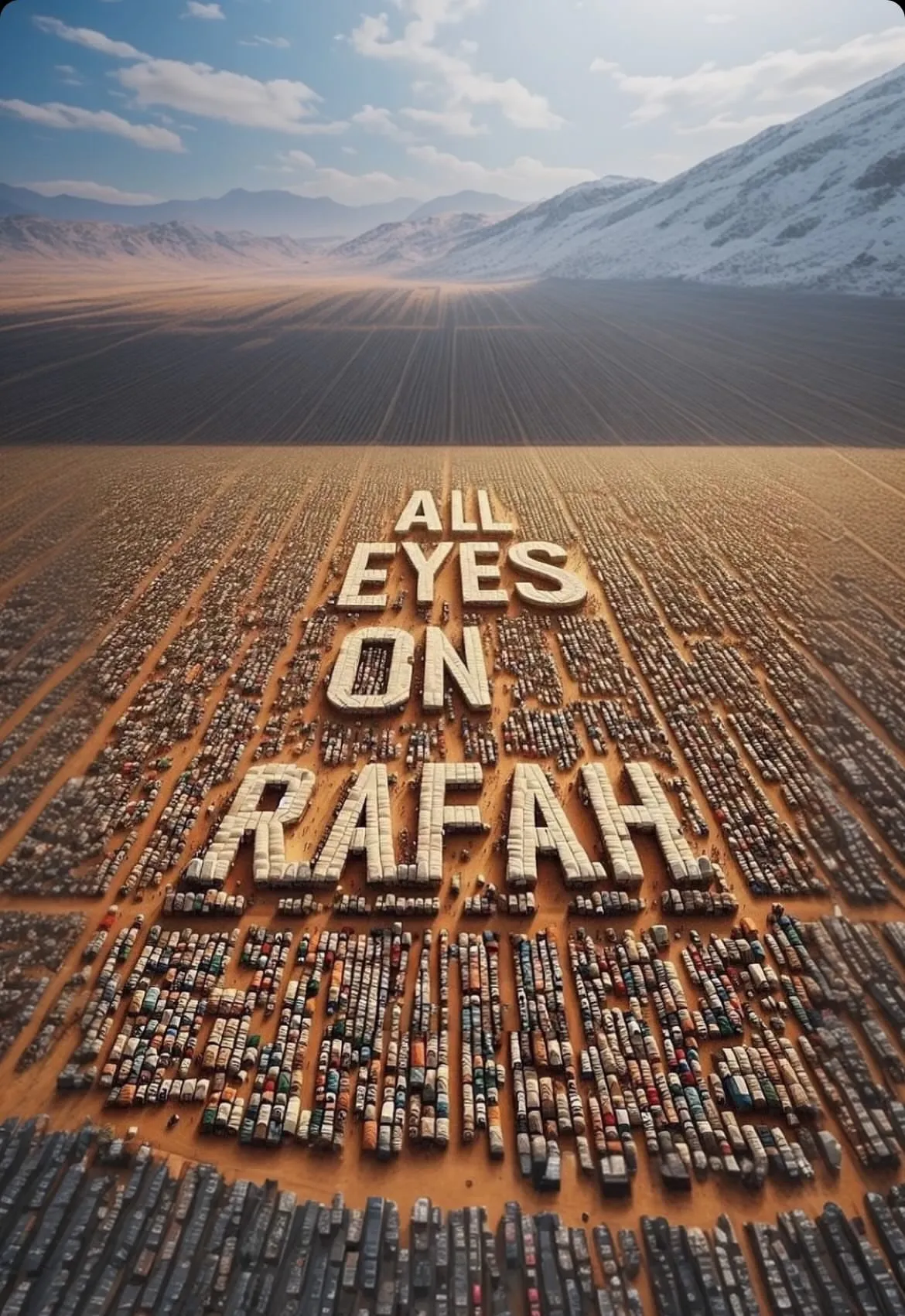
AI-generated "All Eyes on Rafah" image that went viral on Instagram in May 2024

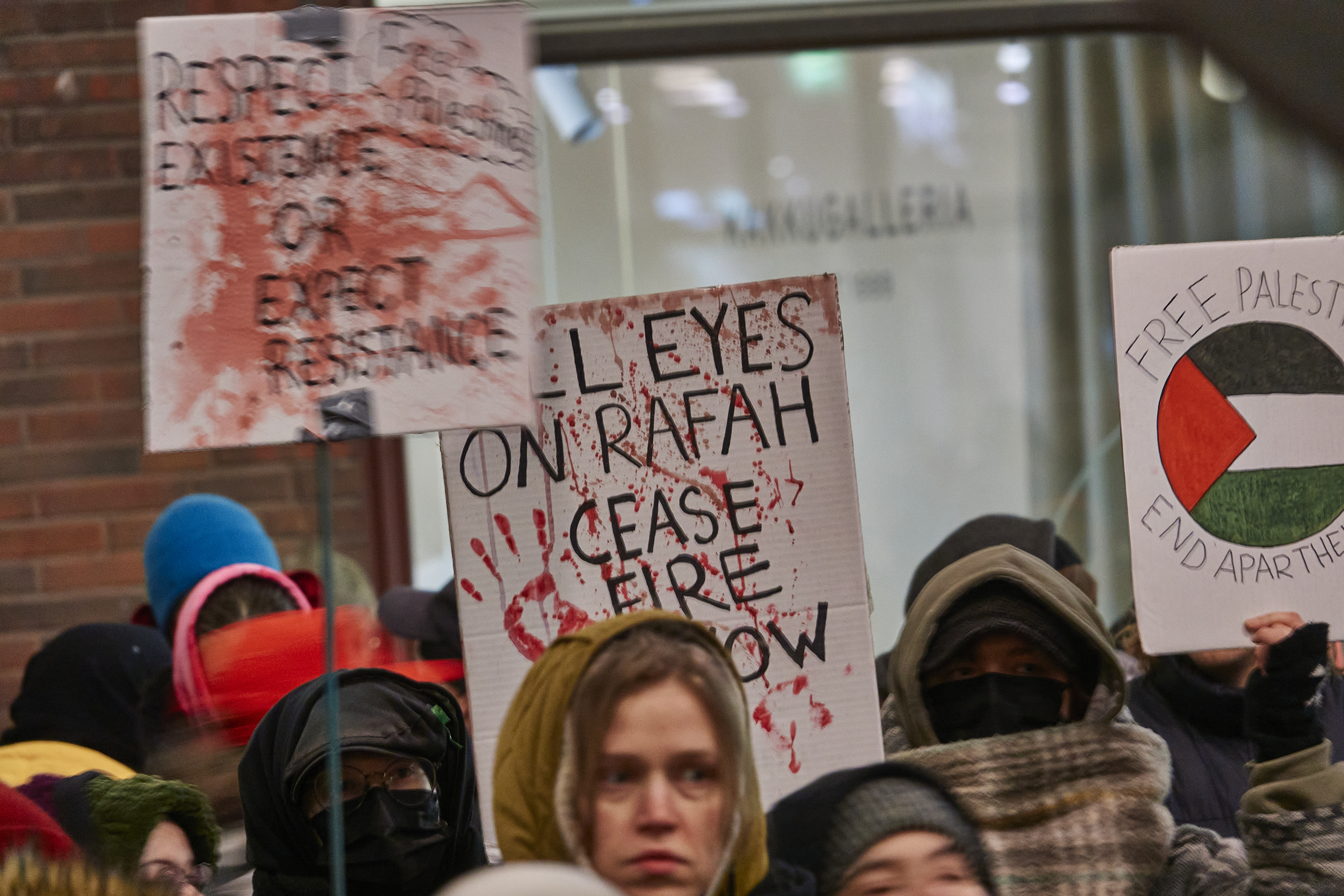
The phrase on a placard at a demonstration in Helsinki, Finland, in February 2024

"All Eyes on Rafah" is a pro-Palestinian political slogan during the Gaza war and Rafah offensive, mostly used on social media.

The phrase derives from a comment made by Richard "Rik" Peeperkorn, the World Health Organization's representative for Gaza and the West Bank, when he told journalists at the UN in February 2024 that "All eyes are on Rafah". This extract from Peeperkorn's broadcast began to be shared when the Rafah offensive began in early May, and an AI-generated image of the slogan went viral on Instagram later that month.

The hashtag #alleyesonrafah has been featured in videos viewed millions of times on TikTok, and the slogan has been used internationally at protests.

== Meaning and origin ==
The phrase "All Eyes on Rafah" references the Rafah offensive, an ongoing military operation in and around the city of Rafah, a city near the Gaza Strip's border with Egypt. By February 2024, when Israel announced the operation, nearly half of Gaza's population of 2.3 million had been pushed into Rafah due to Israeli orders for Palestinians to evacuate there and actions elsewhere in the strip. The announcement was condemned by many countries. About a million Palestinian civilians left Rafah after repeated warnings and following Israeli calls for evacuation prior to the commencement of Israeli military operations. About a million Gazans followed Israeli instructions and evacuated from Rafah.

== Viral image ==
In late May 2024, an AI-generated image depicting the phrase had been shared more than 47 million times in the space of a few days on Instagram, going viral on social media following the Tel al-Sultan attack. Users with large followings, including celebrities like Bella Hadid and Nicola Coughlan, also participated in the trend. The AI-generated image accompanying the sentence shows an aerial view of a camp set up in orderly rows of tents, with snowy peaks in the background. Light-colored tents are arranged to spell out the words "All eyes on Rafah".

The origin of the image is disputed. The image has been attributed to Malaysian photographer Amirul Shah who first posted it to Instagram, but AI hobbyist Zila Abka claims to have posted a square, watermarked version of the same image to Facebook in February, having used AI to generate it herself. She believes that Shah took this image and expanded it to remove her watermark and add a mountain range across the top, before sharing it to Instagram.

'All Eyes on Rafah' also gained notable traction within the association football community, as the image was posted by many professional footballers, including Arsenal's William Saliba, Barcelona’s João Cancelo, Paris St. Germain's Ousmane Dembélé, Chelsea's Nicolas Jackson, Atalanta's Gianluca Scamacca, AC Milan's Rafael Leão, Inter Milan's Marcus Thuram, 2023 women's Ballon D'Or winner Aitana Bonmatí, and BBC broadcaster Gary Lineker.

Some social media users criticized the trend, comparing it to 2020's Blackout Tuesday, which some criticized for being performative activism or virtue signaling. Other users suggested that the trend was sanitizing ongoing events, and that users should instead post actual images from Rafah.

After several Bollywood celebrities shared the "All Eyes on Rafah" poster on social media, "Boycott Bollywood" started trending on Twitter. Users taking part in the Boycott Bollywood trend asked Indian actors who had shared the image why they did not also speak out about attacks on Hindus in other countries, such as Pakistan. A pro-Israel response to the image that asked "Where were your eyes on October 7th?" was removed by Meta after having been shared by several hundred thousands.

The phrase and campaign gained renewed criticism in September 2024, after the bodies of six recently-killed Israeli hostages were found in a tunnel in Rafah at the end of August. LeElle Slifer, cousin of Carmel Gat, said “The entire world warned Israel to stay out of Rafah. ‘All eyes on Rafah,’ they said, but could no one see the hostages in Rafah? Could no one see our Carmel?”
