= Collective Ink =

UK publishing company

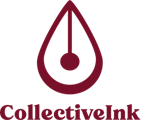
- Parent company: Watkins Media
- Founded: 2001
- Distribution: Simon & Schuster (USA)
- Publication types: Books
- Nonfiction topics: critical theory, philosophy, political theory, music criticism, contemporary cinema, paganism, Christianity, mind body and spirit, history
- Official website: www.collectiveinkbooks.com

Collective Ink (formerly John Hunt Publishing) is a publishing company founded in the United Kingdom in 2001 under the name O Books. The publisher has 15 active imprints, the largest of which are Moon Books, O-Books and Zero Books (styled Zer0 Books). After changing ownership in 2021, in June 2023, John Hunt Publishing was renamed to Collective Ink.

== History ==
Collective Ink was founded in the United Kingdom in 2001, originally named O Books, a name which it continues to use as one of its imprints, in the "mind, body, and spirit" market.

The name was later changed to John Hunt Publishing, under which it then underwent a major reorganization in 2010.

In 2014, it was stated that John Hunt Publishing "deals directly with authors" and does not require they have an agent. However, in the mid-2010s it was stated that "because they are a small publisher, they are unable to pay advances, so [authors] have to wait for the royalties to roll in". Imprints of John Hunt Publishing offered four levels of publishing based on the likely popularity of the book, with both "traditional publishing deals and what it describes as co-operative publishing for authors," with about a quarter of books, most prevalently those in fiction, being published "under co-operative terms," though this would vary by imprint. The company also said that "every title gets treated the same. No bookshop or reviewer is going to know if one title or another has had a subsidy." As with other imprints, operations are controlled by authors themselves, who "have gravitated to being involved in publishing, whether coming up through editing, design or marketing." This multiple-imprint author-centric style was described as, "It can't work. It shouldn't work. Yet, somehow, John Hunt Publishing is making it work." A central corporate office continues to manage sales, accounts, and royalties for all imprints. As of 2014, the company was publishing "approximately 300 titles per year with global sales and a focus on physical stores."

On October 25, 2021, it was announced that Watkins Books owner Etan Ilfeld had purchased John Hunt Publishing from John Hunt. In June 2023, John Hunt Publishing was renamed to Collective Ink.

Like its predecessor, Collective Ink does not require authors to have an agent, and "welcomes unsolicited manuscript submissions". The publisher also routinely publishes lists of contacts for its published authors and data regarding books in production, the number of advertisements run for books, and average royalty payments.

== Zero Books ==
Zero Books is the largest imprint of Collective Ink

The Zero Books imprint was founded to combat what they viewed as a trend of anti-intellectualism in contemporary culture.

Zero Books predominantly publishes works of critical thinking and philosophy, such as Mark Fisher's Capitalist Realism and Eugene Thacker's In The Dust of this Planet.

Zero Books imprint was founded by Tariq Goddard and Mark Fisher in 2009, as an imprint of John Hunt Publishing. In 2014, Goddard and Fisher left Zero Books and launched Repeater Books as a part of Watkins Media.

From 2014 the imprint was run directly through John Hunt with associated authors and freelancers, and has published critically acclaimed books such as Kill All Normies and Zen City. The imprint began publishing a series called Neglected or Misunderstood in 2017 with the aim of covering "neglected or misunderstood" left-wing theorists such as Shulamith Firestone and Theodor Adorno. Zero Books states that their goal is to utilize critical theory to "publish books that make our readers uncomfortable" in order to "reinvent the left".

Collective Ink was brought by Watkins Media in October 2021, bringing Zero Books and Repeater Books under the same ownership. This allowed some Zero Book assets to be transferred to their originators at Repeater Books.

On October 23, 2021, Repeater Books announced that they had regained the Zero Books imprint under the control of publisher Tariq Goddard via the purchasing of John Hunt Publishing by Repeater parent company Watkins Media, which owns both Collective Ink as a publishing company in its own right and Repeater as a Watkins imprint respectively.

=== Selected books ===
- Capitalist Realism: Is There No Alternative? (2009), by Mark Fisher
- Meat Market: Female Flesh Under Capitalism (2011), by Laurie Penny
- Kill All Normies (2017), by Angela Nagle
- Marx Returns (2018), by Jason Barker

== Authors ==
Some authors published through John Hunt Publishing include: Andrez Bergen, Frithjof Bergmann, Danielle Collobert, David Fontana, Nicholas Hagger, Leslie Scalapino, Norman Jetmundsen, and Steve Taylor. Authors published through the Zero Books imprint include: Angela Nagle, Mark Fisher, James Heartfield, Tariq Goddard, David Stubbs, Guy Mankowski, Hatty Nestor, Sam Shain, Adam Kotsko, Owen Hatherley, Cliff Slaughter, Anselm Jappe, Aaron J. Leonard, Laurie Penny, Grafton Tanner, Eugene Thacker, Gilad Atzmon, and David Cromwell.

== Imprints ==
=== Current ===
As of 2023, the active imprints of John Hunt Publishing are described as:

- 6th Books – All things paranormal
- Business Books – "Fresh thinking for the business world"
- Changemakers Books – Transformation
- Chronos Books – History
- Christian Alternative – "The new open spaces"
- Circle Books – Christian faith
- Iff Books – Academic and specialist
- Liberalis – Liberal arts education and storytelling
- Lodestone Books – Young adult fiction
- Mantra Books – Eastern religion and philosophy
- Moon Books – Paganism and shamanism
- O-Books – Spirituality
- Our Street Books – Juvenile fiction, non-fiction, and parenting
- Psyche Books – Psychology
- Roundfire – Fiction
- Zero Books – Culture, society and politics

=== Former ===
- Cosmic Egg Books – Fantasy, science fiction, and horror
- Dodona Books – Astrology, numerology and general divination
- Earth Books – Environment
- Compass Books – Practical books for authors
- Perfect Edge – "Fiction for those who know fiction matters", noted on the website as "no longer receiving submissions"
- Bedroom Books – Romance and "sexy-time"
- Gaming Books – Card and board games
- Soul Rocks – New generation
- Top Hat Books – Historical fiction
- Sassy Books – "Badass books for go-for-it girls"
