= Aaron J. Leonard =

American author

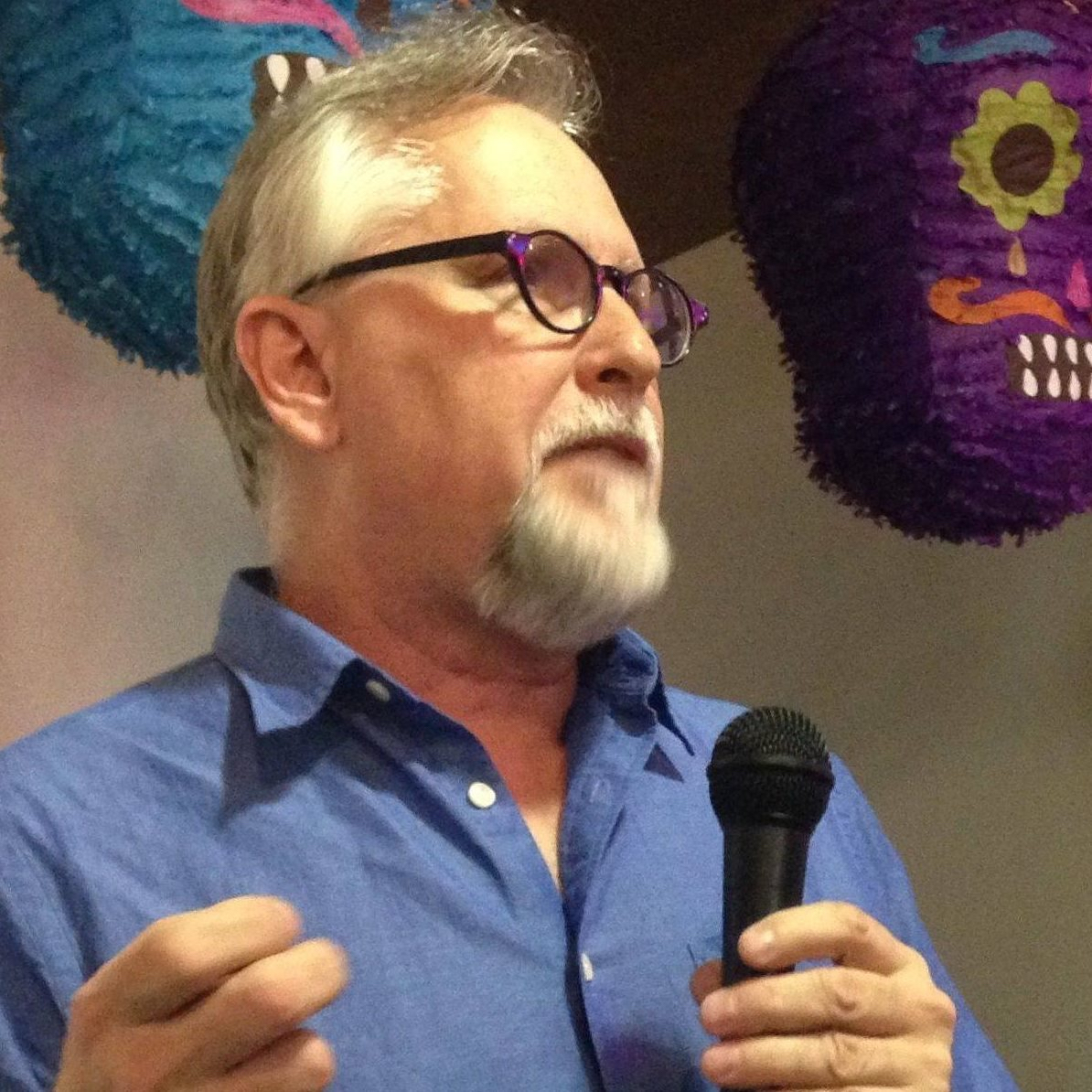
Leonard speaking in 2023

Aaron J. Leonard is an American author with a particular focus on the history of radicalism and state suppression.

== Biography ==
Leonard was born in Herkimer, New York. He became politically active as a teenager, forming a left-leaning group called the Stoned Rabbits Peoples Party with his fellow high school students in his home town. On graduation he moved to the Pacific Northwest where he began working with the Revolutionary Communist Party, first with the Unemployed Workers Organizing Committee (UWOC), then the Revolutionary Communist Youth Brigade (RCYB), and finally writing for its newspaper, the Revolutionary Worker, before breaking with the group in the early 2000s.

He has a BA in Social Sciences and History. He graduated, magna cum laude, from New York University in 2012. In 2017 he began work on a PhD in history at UC Irvine, but withdrew to pursue writing full time. He lives in Sacramento.

== Works ==
He is the author of Heavy Radicals: The FBI’s Secret War on America’s Maoists (Zer0 Books 2015, ISBN 978-1-78279-534-6) and A Threat of the First Magnitude—FBI Counterintelligence & Infiltration: From the Communist Party to the Revolutionary Union.(Repeater Books, 2018, ISBN 9781910924709).

In 2020 he published The Folk Singers and the Bureau (Repeater Books). Joe Pagetta, writing in America magazine said, "Aaron J. Leonard’s new book, The Folk Singers and the Bureau, draws from almost 10,000 pages of F.B.I. files on an array of folk artists. It aims to illustrate the considerable impact that the U.S. government’s campaign against Communism had on folk artists in the 1940s and early ’50s." Daniel Rosenberg, in American Communist History wrote: "Aaron J. Leonard has contributed a solid piece of research to the history of FBI repression of the Communist Party USA by tracing the surveillance, investigation, and harassment of folk singers, many of whom belonged or were sympathetic to the Party."

In February 2023, his book Whole World in an Uproar: Music, Rebellion & Repression - 1955-1972 was published.(Repeater Books, 2023, ISBN 9781914420924). It focuses on folk and pop musicians that were subjects of FBI surveillance and monitoring since the 1950s. Such artists included Pete Seeger, Phil Ochs and Dave Van Ronk due to their affiliations with organized groups or specific political activism such as making anti-war statements and contributing to "civil unrest".

In May 2024 he published Meltdown Expected: Crisis, Disorder & Upheaval at the end of the 1970s (Rutgers Univ. Press), the story of the power shifts from late 1978 through 1979 leading to the final phase of the Cold War. In 2025 he published 'Menace of Our Time: The Long War Against American Communism, (Rutgers University Press), a history of the repression directed at the Communist Party USA from its founding in 1919 to the collapse of the Soviet Union in 1991.

His next book, An Era of Disruption of Violence: The FBI and the shattering of the Sixties New Left, will publish on July 13, 2027.

Leonard is also a contributor to the news sites Truthout LA Progressive, and Jacobin.
