= Anna Minton =

British journalist and writer (born 1970)

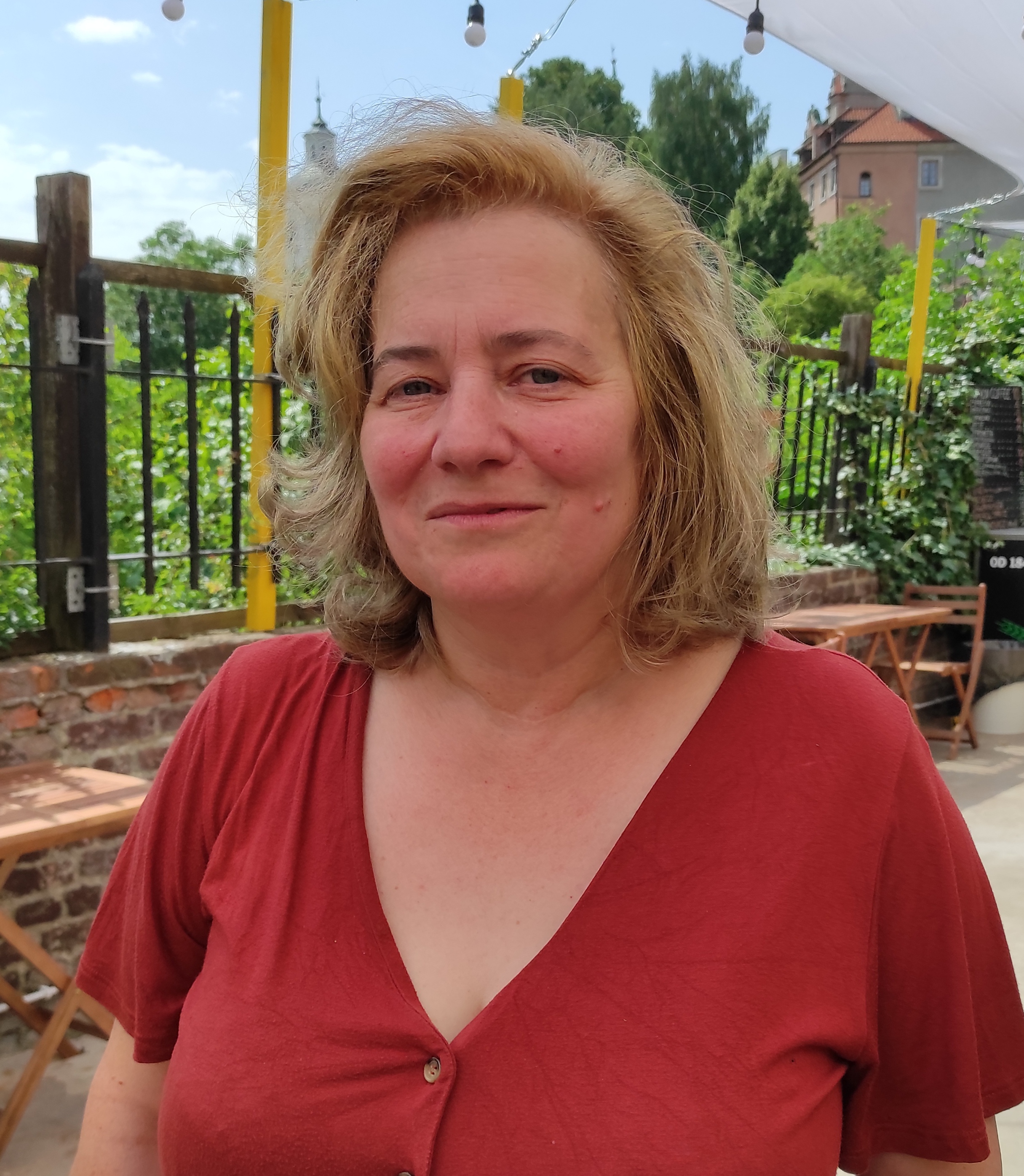
- Born: 19 April 1970 (age 56); England
- Education: The Queen's College, Oxford
- Occupations: Journalist, writer, academic
- Website: www.annaminton.com

Anna Minton is a British writer, journalist, and academic. Born 19 April 1970, educated at Queen's College, Oxford, Minton has worked as a foreign correspondent, business reporter and social affairs writer and has won a number of national journalism awards. She is the author of Big Capital: Who is London For? (Penguin, 2017) and Ground Control: Fear and Happiness in the Twenty-First Century City (Penguin, 2009).

== Work ==
After a decade in journalism, including a period spent as a staff member of the Financial Times, Minton began to focus on larger projects for various think tanks and policy organisations, which culminated in her writing her first book, Ground Control: Fear and Happiness in the Twenty-First Century City (Penguin, 2009) is a book which looks at the ownership of various UK cities to investigate the effect and nature of public space. She is a regular contributor to The Guardian.

Minton's interest in public space took root when she wrote a series of reports on the polarisation and privatisation of cities. The first, ‘Building Balanced Communities’, was originally published by the Royal Institution of Chartered Surveyors in 2002 and focused on gated communities and ghettos in the United States, questioning to what extent these trends were also being transported to the United Kingdom. The second, ‘Northern Soul' (Demos and the RICS, 2003) looked at polarisation and culture in the British city of Newcastle, while Minton's third and final report, ‘What Kind of World Are We Building?’ (RICS, 2006) investigated the growing privatisation of public space in the United Kingdom.

She is a Reader in Architecture at the University of East London where she is Programme Leader of UEL's new post graduate MRes course, Reading the Neoliberal City. In 2016 she co-edited, with Paul Watt, a special edition of the journal CITY, focusing on the housing crisis, which informed research for Big Capital. She is a regular contributor to The Guardian, writing often on housing, cities, democracy and public space.

She is a regular conference speaker and frequent broadcaster. She lives in South London with her partner Martin Pickles, who is an animator, and their two sons.

== Bibliography ==
- Ground Control: Fear and Happiness in the Twenty-First Century City. Penguin. 2009.
- Big Capital: Who Is London For?. Penguin. 2017.
- Regeneration Songs: Sounds of Investment and Loss from East London. (Editor, with Alberto Duman, Dan Hancox and Malcolm James). Repeater Books. 2018. ISBN 9781912248230.
