= Exiting the Vampire Castle =

2013 political essay by Mark Fisher

"Exiting the Vampire Castle" is an essay written by the English theorist Mark Fisher for the online publication The North Star in 2013. It argues for increased leftist solidarity by departing from the phenomenon of online cancel culture to instead orient activity around organization of efforts around the accountability of one's economic class, rather than around traits in identity and culture.

== Synopsis ==
Fisher argues that a largely online style of identity-based leftist discourse grounded in "witch-hunting moralism" halts productive leftist discourse and undermines class politics. In particular, the combination of a primary focus on identity and the policing of others' speech is deleterious. Fisher saw the turn from class and materialism towards identity as a move from objective outward-facing goals to subjective inward goals that result in fragmentation of the left's efforts and community.

== Reception ==
Jacobin magazine described "Exiting the Vampire Castle" as Fisher's "most loved and hated essay".

== Influence ==
Michael Brooks' book Against the Web: A Cosmopolitan Answer to the New Right uses concepts from "Exiting the Vampire Castle" to describe the limits Brooks observes in leftist tactics. Noting the condemnation and alienation common among leftists of the "Castle", Brooks proposes a "cosmopolitan socialism" alternative built on the works of Cornel West, Amartya Sen, and C. L. R. James.

Marc James Léger references Fisher's essay in his introduction to the book Identity Trumps Socialism: The Class and Identity Debate after Neoliberalism under the concept of "decadent Marxism," which marks the decline of the petty-bourgeois and counter-cultural tendencies that became dominant after the postwar-era and the problems that this poses for the renewal of socialism.
