= Claire Cronin (singer-songwriter) =

Singer and song writer

- Genre: Folk
- Years active: 2015–present
- Website: www.overandthrough.com

Claire Cronin is a singer-songwriter and author. She has released five albums since 2015.

== Biography ==
Cronin moved from Los Angeles to Athens, Georgia in the summer of 2015. In addition to her music career, she is a poet and as of 2019 was a PhD student in creative writing at the University of Georgia, completing a thesis on horror films and television. She has described poetry and songwriting as "equally meaningful, difficult and necessary", saying "they may come from the same inner place, but ... there is a different burden on poetry to silently perform emotion and nuance to a reader, [whereas] a singer's voice can impart these things in how it handles lyrics—transforming a really simple refrain into something profound, for example." Cronin has named the songwriters Jason Molina, Nick Drake, Chan Marshall and Jeff Mangum, and the poets Brigit Pegeen Kelly, Frank Stanford and Sara Nicholson as influences. She is married to Ezra Buchla of The Mae Shi, with whom she also frequently collaborates.

== Over and Through (2015) ==
Over and Through, a compilation of Cronin's work produced over the previous several years, was released in 2015.

== Came Down a Storm (2016) ==
Came Down a Storm, produced in collaboration with John Dieterich of Deerhoof, was released in 2016. Cronin has described the album as resembling a concept album by virtue of the songs' focus on "death and the afterlife" and their construction of "overlapping narratives and characters." Gabe Vodicka, writing in Flagpole Magazine, singles out "The Unnatural" for praise and described the album's other songs as "both beautiful and terrifying—abstract stories of personal victory set against a sea of apocalyptic imagery."

== Big Dread Moon (2019) ==
Big Dread Moon was released in 2019. The album's lyrics draw on Cronin's interest in horror films; musically, most songs feature only vocals, guitar and viola, while only some use synthesizers and percussion.

Sam Sodomsky of Pitchfork described Cronin's lyrics on the album as "kaleidoscopic" and "heavy with pre-traumatic calm." Sodomsky noted that the album strikes a "balance between tenderness and terror, the supernatural and the quotidian" and praised "Wolfman" as a high point, describing it as "a slow, menacing ballad sung with the devotion of a love song." Writing for Talkhouse, Sam Woodring wrote that Big Dread Moon "betrays a strong knack for narrative, pacing, and imagery, probably indebted to her other artistic endeavor as a writer" and noted that Cronin's vocals "dart around in a way that builds suspense not only for what she is about to say, but for how she may or may not buckle her words into pitch-perfect severed parts."

== Blue Light of the Screen (2020) ==
Cronin's first book of non-fiction, Blue Light of the Screen: On Horror, Ghosts, and God, was published by Repeater Books in October 2020. Reviewing the book in International Times, Rupert Loydell described it as "an obsessional, egotistical nightmare of a book, a shapeshifting gothic narrative". Enrico Monacelli in The Quietus described it as "a blood-shot eyed tour-guide to losing one's ability to speak and think; to being bewildered by the strangeness of the dead and the living".

== Bloodless (2021) ==
Cronin's fourth album, Bloodless, was released in November 2021. Reviewing the album in God Is in the TV, Trev Elkins described it as "more real, personal and direct" in its examination of fear and sorrow than Big Dread Moon, but noted that it also contains moments of humor, as well as "beautiful, melancholic rawness and cautionary tales". Bruce Miller of PopMatters also compared the two albums, identifying Bloodless's production during the COVID-19 pandemic and 2020 California wildfires as contributing to its sense of intensity and uncertainty, and comparing it to the work of Brigid Mae Power and Neil Young.

== The Bruise (2026) ==
Cronin's fifth album, The Bruise, was released in October 2026. It featured Buchla, John Dieterich of Deerhoof, and Julia Holter.
