= Kill All Normies =

2017 nonfiction book by Angela Nagle

- Author: Angela Nagle
- Language: English
- Subject: Internet culture, alt-right, political correctness
- Genre: Cultural studies
- Publisher: Zero Books
- Publication date: 2017
- Publication place: United Kingdom
- Pages: 136 pp.
- ISBN: 978-1-78-535543-1

Kill All Normies: Online Culture Wars from 4chan and Tumblr to Trump and the Alt-Right is a 2017 non-fiction book by Angela Nagle published by Zero Books. It describes the development of internet culture, the nature of political correctness, the emergence of the alt-right and the 2016 election of Donald Trump. Nagle offers a left-wing critique of contemporary social liberalism, arguing that it helped create the alt-right movement.

== Content ==
The book describes the development of internet culture, the nature of political correctness, the emergence of the alt-right and the 2016 election of Donald Trump.

Nagle presents her work as an attempt to map the online culture wars that occurred in the early 2010s and how it resulted in the development of alt-right which played a major role in the election of Donald Trump. Nagle introduces the 2010s as a period in which "cyber utopianism" began to emerge with the rise of internet-based social activism such as the Arab Spring, Occupy movement, WikiLeaks and Anonymous which were based on decentralized leadership and online organization. This internet-based activism was immediately embraced by much of mainstream liberalism without any rigorous analysis or appraisal of the organizational structure and limitations of these internet-based movements, which all resulted in consistent failure and eventual collapse. Many of these movements began on image-based online forums such as 4chan and 8chan. These forums, organized on the basis of anonymity, developed a subculture among the users that combined extremely transgressive and dark humor with a deeply misogynistic and racist attitude.

In the second chapter, titled "The Online Politics of Transgression", Nagle observes how political transgression historically is associated with the political Left, specifically that of the New Left, which was adopted by the Alt-Right. Nagle frames this adoption of transgression by the political right in relation to the concept of moral transgression, which can be traced to the eighteenth century figures of Marquis De Sade, The Surrealists, Friedrich Nietzsche, Punk subculture, and contemporaneously in the 1990s 'male rampage films' like American Psycho and Fight Club. This 'transgressive anti-moral style' of the Alt-Right, according to Nagle, is their attempt to completely break away from the egalitarian philosophy of the Left and the Christian morality of the Right.

In chapter three, "Gramscians of the Alt-Lite", Nagle focuses on the popularity of the French New Right within the circles of the Alt-Right.

== Publication and reception ==
Kill All Normies received a polarized reception from critics and columnists, with Vice, New York, and The New Republic publishing positive reviews of the book, whereas outlets such as The Daily Beast, Libcom, CounterPunch, and The New Socialist criticized Nagle's description of campus activism. A review in The Daily Beast said the book was plagued by "sloppy sourcing", noting an allegation that parts of the book had been plagiarized. Nagle and her publisher both rejected the accusations. In his review, Red Wedge Magazine co-author accused Nagle of failing to understand the countercultures she writes about, claiming that she portrays alt-right groups on 4chan and social justice communities on Tumblr as being equally violent. Nagle called the review "hilarious" in an interview with Zero Books.

Columnist Ross Douthat of the New York Times praised Nagle's "portrait of the online cultural war", and the Times columnist Michelle Goldberg said that Kill All Normies had "captured this phenomenon". Novelist George Saunders listed Kill All Normies as one of his ten favorite books helping him through the "current political moment".

An episode of the Fusion Networks' TV series Trumpland directed by Leighton Woodhouse was based on the book. A Spanish edition was published in May 2018 by Orciny Press, and a German edition in September 2018 by Transcript.

== See also ==
- It Came from Something Awful
