= Angela Nagle =

Irish writer and academic (born 1984)

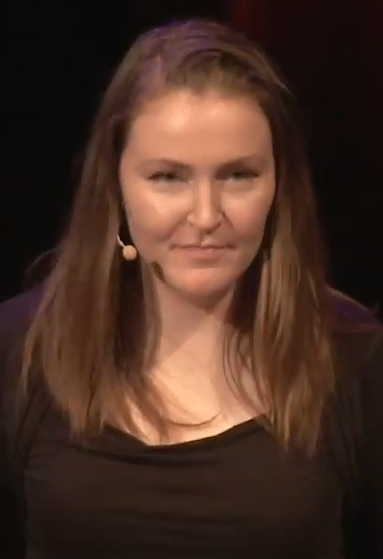
- Nagle in 2017
- Born: 1984 (age 41–42); Texas, U.S.
- Education: Dublin City University
- Writing career
- Genre: Non-Fiction
- Notable work: Kill All Normies

Angela Nagle (born 1984) is an Irish academic and non-fiction writer who has written for The Baffler, Jacobin, and others. She is the author of the book Kill All Normies, published by Zero Books in 2017, which discusses the role of the internet in the rise of the alt-right and incel movements. Nagle describes the alt-right as a dangerous movement but also criticizes aspects of the left that she says have contributed to the alt-right's rise. Since 2021, she has been publishing articles on a wide range of personal, political and cultural topics via the online publishing platform Substack.

== Early life and education ==
Nagle was born in Houston, Texas, to Irish parents, then grew up in Dublin, Ireland. She graduated from Dublin City University with a PhD for a thesis titled "An investigation into contemporary online anti-feminist movements".

== Alt-right and culture wars ==
Nagle's book Kill All Normies: Online Culture Wars from 4chan and Tumblr to Trump and the Alt-Right discusses the role of the internet in the rise of the alt-right and incel movements. She describes the alt-right as a counterculture of young men who reject taboos on race and gender. While many young people in the alt-right started simply as trolls, she says the movement has developed into something much more serious. While she supports identity politics in general, she says that some on the left have contributed to the rise of the alt-right with their "performative wokeness", which often involves censoring dissidents and ganging up on them. She has also expressed concerns about "the woke cultural revolution sweeping Irish society".

The book received many positive reviews, and Nagle became a welcome commentator on the topic of online culture wars. Columnist Ross Douthat of The New York Times praised Nagle's "portrait of the online cultural war". Another New York Times contributor, Michelle Goldberg, wrote that Kill All Normies had "captured this phenomenon". Novelist George Saunders listed Kill All Normies as one of his ten favorite books. Fusion TV's documentary Trumpland: Kill All Normies directed by Leighton Woodhouse was based on the Nagle's book.

In May 2018, The Daily Beast and Libcom.org accused Nagle of "sloppy sourcing", including not citing sources and drawing heavily from Wikipedia and RationalWiki. Nagle and her publisher both issued detailed statements rebutting the accusations, and The Daily Beast adjusted some of the article's wording.

== Open borders ==
In November 2018, American Affairs published Nagle's essay "The Left Case against Open Borders", in which she voiced opposition to immigration from a left-wing perspective. The Nation responded with an essay in which author Atossa Araxia Abrahamian criticizes Nagle and others who, according to Abrahamian, hold similar views, like economist Larry Summers, author John Judis, and Hillary Clinton. Abrahamian states that "it’s hard not to think that it’s arguments like [Nagle's] that damage the left by legitimizing the idea that someone arbitrarily born on the wrong side of a line is less deserving of a good life."

Writing in The Independent, Slovenian philosopher and academic Slavoj Žižek commented on the "ferocious attacks on Angela Nagle for her outstanding essay." American cultural theorist and author Catherine Liu defended Nagle, considering her to be "one of the brightest lights in a new generation of left writers and thinkers who have declared their independence from intellectual conformity". In the summer of 2020, Nagle and Michael Tracey co-wrote a long-form piece in the journal American Affairs.

== Bibliography ==
- Nagle, Angela (2013). "Not Quite Kicking Off Everywhere: Feminist Notes on Digital Liberation" (PDF). Internet Research, Theory, and Practice: Perspectives from Ireland: 157–175 – via ERIC Clearinghouse.
- Nagle, Angela (2017). Kill All Normies: Online Culture Wars From 4Chan And Tumblr To Trump And The Alt-Right. Alresford, UK: Zero Books. ISBN 978-1-78-535543-1.
