= Laurie Penny =

English journalist, columnist and author (born 1986)

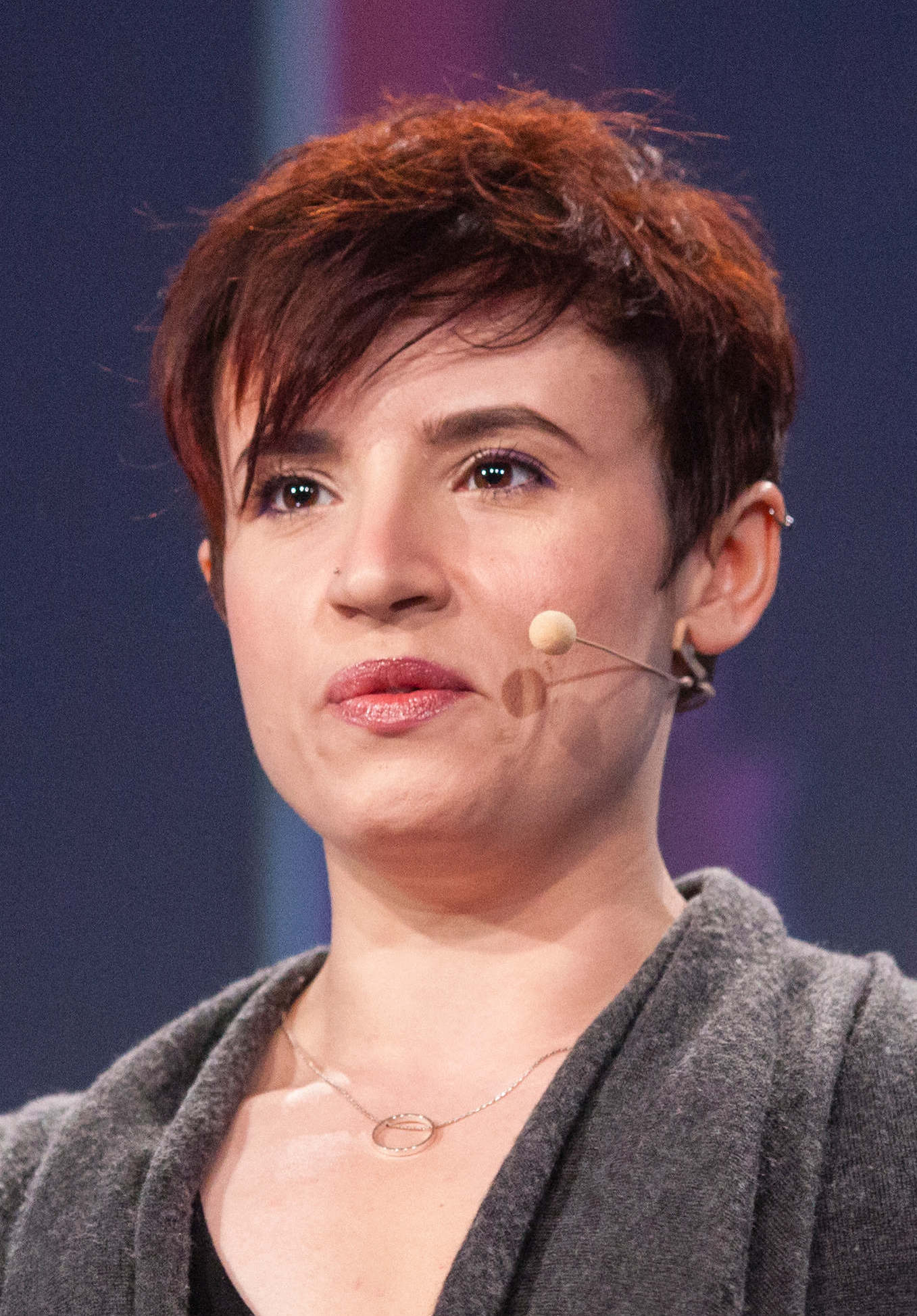
- Penny in 2016
- Born: Laura Barnett; 28 September 1986 (age 40); London, England
- Education: Brighton College
- Alma mater: Wadham College, Oxford
- Occupations: Journalist, author, screenwriter

Laurie Penny (born Laura Barnett, 28 September 1986) is a British journalist and writer. Penny has written articles for publications including The Guardian, The Spectator, The New York Times, and Salon. Penny is a contributing editor at the New Statesman and the author of several books on feminism, and they have also written for American television shows including The Haunting of Bly Manor and The Nevers.

== Early life and education ==
Penny was born in London, England, to two lawyers of Irish, Jewish, and Maltese descent, and grew up in Lewes and Brighton. Penny suffered from anorexia nervosa as a teenager and was hospitalised with the condition aged 17. They recovered from the illness and wrote about the experience from a feminist perspective in their book Unspeakable Things.

Penny attended the fee-paying private school Brighton College before studying English at Wadham College, Oxford.

== Career ==
Penny's blog "Penny Red" was launched in 2007 and was shortlisted for the Orwell Prize for blogging in 2010. Penny became a columnist at The Independent in 2012 and then a columnist and contributing editor for the New Statesman. They are a regular contributor to The Guardian.

In April 2011, they presented the Channel 4 Dispatches programme "Cashing in on Degrees" and appeared on Channel 4's satirical current affairs programme 10 O'Clock Live and on BBC Two's Newsnight.

In 2012, Tatler magazine described Penny as one of the top 100 "people who matter". In October 2012, The Daily Telegraph ranked Penny as the 55th most influential left-wing figure in Britain, describing them as "without doubt the loudest and most controversial female voice on the radical left", and the knowledge networking company Editorial Intelligence awarded Penny its "Twitter Public Personality" award. In 2015, Penny was a Nieman Fellow at Harvard University, and a fellow at the Berkman Klein Center for Internet & Society also at Harvard.

Several of Penny's articles have provoked criticism, including a 2014 article for the New Statesman that argued short hair on women was a "political statement" and a 2015 article defending vandalism of the Monument to the Women of World War II.

=== Publications ===
Penny is the author of nine books, including Bitch Doctrine, Unspeakable Things, and Everything Belongs to the Future. Penny's book Penny Red: Notes from the New Age of Dissent was shortlisted for the first Bread and Roses Award for Radical Publishing in 2012. Their seventh book, Bitch Doctrine: Essays for Dissenting Adults, was longlisted for the 2018 Orwell Prize.

=== Screenwriting ===
Penny has written for streaming TV, contributing to episodes of the Netflix show The Haunting of Bly Manor and HBO's The Nevers. Penny also worked as a story editor on Carnival Row.

== Personal life ==
Penny came out as genderqueer, pansexual, and polyamorous in 2015. In 2020, Penny stated a preference for the pronouns they/them; they also use she/her pronouns, although they consider them to be "less accurate". Penny disclosed in May 2022 that they are autistic.

Penny got married in 2020 and was living in the United States. As of May 2025 they were divorced.

== Awards ==
Year	Nominated work	Award	Category	Result	Ref.
2010	—	Orwell Prize	Blogger	Shortlist	
2012	Penny Red: Notes from the New Age of Dissent	Bread and Roses Award	—	Shortlist	
2014	—	Red Women of the Year Award	Blogger	Shortlist	
2017	—	John W. Campbell Award for Best New Writer	—	Shortlist	
2018	Longreads columns	National Magazine Awards	Columns and Commentary	Shortlist	

== Bibliography ==
- Meat Market: Female Flesh Under Capitalism (Zero Books, 2011)
- Penny Red: Notes from the New Age of Dissent (Pluto Press, 2011)
- Discordia: Six Nights in Crisis Athens (illustrated by Molly Crabapple, Random House, 2012)
- Cybersexism: Sex, Gender and Power on the Internet (Bloomsbury Publishing, 2013)
- Unspeakable Things: Sex, Lies and Revolution (Bloomsbury Publishing, 2014)
- Everything Belongs to the Future (Tor.com, 2016)
- Bitch Doctrine: Essays for Dissenting Adults (Bloomsbury USA, 2017)
- Sexual Revolution: Modern Fascism and the Feminist Fightback (Bloomsbury Publishing, 2022)
