= Repeater Books =

Publishing imprint based in London, England

- Parent company: Watkins Media
- Founded: 2014
- Founders: Tariq Goddard, Etan Ilfeld, Alex Niven, Mark Fisher, Tamar Shlaim, Matteo Mandarini
- Country of origin: United Kingdom
- Headquarters location: London
- Distribution: GBS (UK); Random House (US)
- Publication types: Books
- Imprints: Zero Books
- Official website: www.repeaterbooks.com

Repeater Books is a publishing imprint based in London, founded in 2014 by Tariq Goddard and Mark Fisher, formerly the founders of radical publishers Zero Books, along with Etan Ilfeld, Tamar Shlaim, Alex Niven and Matteo Mandarini. It was launched by Watkins Media.

== Formation ==
In 2014, after disagreements with their parent company John Hunt Publishing (now Collective Ink), Zero Books founders Tariq Goddard and Mark Fisher, as well as Matteo Mandarini, editor Alex Niven and publicist Tamar Shlaim, resigned, and formed the new imprint Repeater Books.

In 2015, Repeater Books published its first two titles: The Isle of Minimus, an experimental novel by M. K. L. Murphy; and Lean Out, a feminist polemic by the journalist Dawn Foster. They have since published books by Mark Fisher, Brad Evans, David Stubbs, Graham Harman, Mat Osman, Steven Shaviro, Roy Christopher, Leila Taylor, Claire Cronin, Eugene Thacker, and Todd McGowan, amongst others.

Collective Ink was brought by Watkins Media in October 2021, bringing Zero Books and Repeater Books under the same ownership. This allowed some Zero Book assets to be transferred to their originators at Repeater Books.

On October 23, 2021, Repeater Books announced that they had bought the Zero Books imprint from John Hunt Publishing. However, as of May 2024, it is still listed as on Collective Ink's website as its imprint.

== Authors ==
- Tristam Adams
- Monster Bobby
- Grace Blakeley
- Gavin Butt
- Roy Christopher
- Claire Cronin
- Cynthia Cruz
- Kodwo Eshun
- Mark Fisher
- Dawn Foster
- Eliane Glaser
- Tariq Goddard
- Graham Harman
- Owen Hatherley
- James Heartfield
- Aaron J. Leonard
- Tom Lutz
- Anna Minton
- Todd McGowan
- Alex Niven
- Mat Osman
- Simon Reynolds
- Lee Scott
- Steven Shaviro
- Christiana Spens
- Terence Stamp
- David Stubbs
- Eugene Thacker
- Patrick Wright
