= Inside Housing =

British trade publication

Inside Housing is a monthly trade publication that covers the United Kingdom's social housing sector. The magazine was first published on 30 March 1984, and is part of Ocean Media Group. The headquarters is in London. In 2007, the majority stake of Ocean Media was acquired by AAC Capital Partners.

Inside Housing presents development awards each year for:

- Best older people's housing development (under 70 homes and 71 or over)
- Best shared ownership development
- Design quality
- Best build-for-rent development
- Best approach to modular construction
- Best partnership (under 100 units and 101 or over)
- Market sale development of the year
- Best development team (under 20 members and 21 or over)
- Best regeneration project (under 70 homes and 71 or over)
- Best inclusive development
- Best affordable housing development (under 25 homes and 26-70 and 71 or over)
- Best residential development (under 70 homes and 71 or over)
