= Meat Market: Female Flesh Under Capitalism =

2011 book by Laurie Penny

- Author: Laurie Penny
- Language: English
- Subjects: Feminism, Consumerism, Capitalism
- Published: Winchester
- Publisher: Zero Books
- Publication date: 2011
- Publication place: United Kingdom
- Media type: Print (Paperback)
- Pages: 79
- ISBN: 9781846945212
- Dewey Decimal: 305.42
- Followed by: Unspeakable Things: Sex, Lies and Revolution

Meat Market: Female Flesh Under Capitalism is a 2011 book by British journalist, author and political activist Laurie Penny, which they describe as their "little anti-capitalist-feminist pop-theory book".

== Background ==
The book is critical of "the patriarchal capitalist machine", the sexualisation of women and gender stereotyping, and the capitalist economic system which entrenches discrimination towards women.

== Content ==
- Introduction: Branded Bodies – Penny gives an overview of how female flesh is a resource and commodity, while women are simultaneously the biggest consumers. They state that the book is "an attempt to chart some of the ways in which women's bodies are marginalized and controlled under late capitalism."
- Chapter 1: An Anatomy of Modern Frigidity – Penny begins the novel by discussing the supposed rise of "raunch culture", exemplified by things such as Girls Gone Wild and the Playboy Bunny. They speak of how since sex sells, much of advertisement has been sexualized, but that we are sold an artificial and unrealistic portrayal of sex and sexuality. Furthermore, real sex exists as a threat to capital, as it cannot be branded, mass-produced and resold to us. They then speak of how all women put in a great amount of time and work into becoming sexual objects, but sex work itself is stigmatized and made illegal in society, and that sex workers are some of the most marginalized members of society. They note how sex work is done mostly out of economic necessity, and very rarely out of desire, and therefore sex work should be framed as an economic question and not a moral one.
- Chapter 2: Taking Up Space – In this chapter Penny largely focuses on eating disorders, particularly anorexia. Penny highlights the stories of two young women, Jo and Hannah, who give adverse testimony to the usual ideas surrounding anorexia. Instead of developing the eating disorder to conform to beauty standards, the two confess that they were anorexic in order to look ugly and un-feminine. They go on to note that anorexia awareness campaigns either glamorize and sexualize those suffering from the eating disorder, or they trivialize those suffering and make the women look weak and helpless. Penny rounds out the chapter by giving a personal account of their own struggles dealing with anorexia.
- Chapter 3: Gender Capital – Penny rejects the idea of female body essentialism in defining womanhood. They reject ideas that transgender individuals are either men trying to invade female spaces or repressed homosexuals who would rather change their gender than be in a same-sex relationship. They explain how it is rational for those who wish to be addressed by the gender they feel to feel they must give social cues to those around them. They go on to note that the female identity is something that must be purchased and added to the flesh, and that trans-women know this better than any other group. Trans women often want to live outside gender norms as much as other women, but they are expected to prove their femininity on a routine basis. They also reject the ideas that feminists get to be "gatekeepers" of what is and is not female, and that such gatekeepers are antithetical to feminism as a whole.
- Chapter 4: Dirty Work – Penny explains how capitalism is essential to the marginalization of domestic work. Spaces of work became separate during the industrial revolution, where the home became a private sphere created for women to work on creating and sustaining life. The justification for this separation of the genders quickly took on a social Darwinist approach and the creation of the myth of prehistoric hunter-gatherer gender roles. Furthermore, they explain that men's refusal to gain competency in domestic work is not only a guide to keep women in traditional positions, but also prevents men from achieving independence, making them dependent on women to have a functioning home. Penny tells how many women who have escaped domestic drudgery have simply passed the work on to some other woman that they employ to do the work for them. They round out the books by mentioning that without domestic work western society would crumble.

== Reception ==
In The Independent, Abby O'Reilly described the work as "a nutritious thought-snack for emergent feminists and those approaching female cultural positioning from a socialist perspective" whilst it was described in Peace News as "a great first book on feminism by a worthy successor to Wolf, Greer and Woolf". In the Oxonian Review, the book was praised as a "a stirring call to political action" while in Red Pepper Jennie O'Hara wrote that the Meat Market was "refreshing reading" in its rebuttal of anti-sex feminism. Eleanor Davies of The Anti-capitalist Initiative believes that while the book shows "articulate, sharp observations", it is lacking due to Penny showing no solutions as we head forward.
