= Mark Fisher =

English cultural theorist (1968–2017)

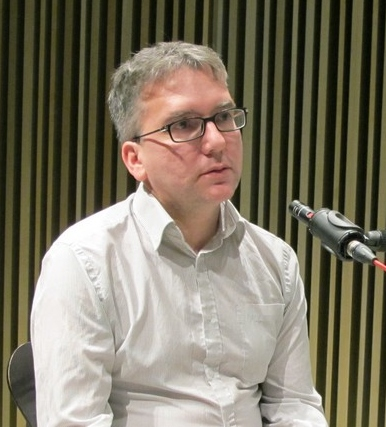
- Fisher in 2011
- Born: 11 July 1968; Leicester, England
- Died: 13 January 2017 (aged 48); Felixstowe, England
- Other name: k-punk
- Spouse: Zoe Fisher
- Children: 1

Education
- Education: University of Hull; University of Warwick
- Thesis: Flatline Constructs (1999)

Philosophical work
- School: Continental philosophy
- Institutions: Goldsmiths' College, London
- Main interests: Critical theory; philosophy; music criticism; political theory; CCRU
- Notable works: Capitalist Realism (2009); k-punk blog (2003–2015); "Exiting the Vampire Castle"
- Notable ideas: Capitalist realism, business ontology, hauntology, the weird and the eerie, acid communism
- Website: k-punk.abstractdynamics.org

Mark Fisher (11 July 1968 – 13 January 2017), also known under his blogging alias k-punk, was an English writer, music critic, political and cultural theorist, philosopher, Marxist and teacher based in the Department of Visual Cultures at Goldsmiths, University of London. He initially achieved acclaim for his blogging as k-punk in the early 2000s, and was known for his writing on radical politics, music, and popular culture.

Fisher published several books, including the unexpected success Capitalist Realism: Is There No Alternative? (2009), and contributed to publications such as The Wire, Fact, New Statesman and Sight & Sound. He was also the co-founder of Zero Books, and later Repeater Books. After years intermittently struggling with depression, Fisher died by suicide in January 2017, shortly before the publication of The Weird and the Eerie (2017).

== Early life and education ==
Fisher was born in Leicester and grew up in Loughborough to working-class, conservative parents. Fisher's father was an engineering technician and his mother a cleaner. Fisher attended a local comprehensive school. He was formatively influenced in his youth by the post-punk music press of the late 1970s, particularly papers like the NME which crossed music with politics, film, and fiction. He was also influenced by the relationship between working class culture and football, being present at the Hillsborough disaster.

Fisher earned a B.A. in English and Philosophy at Hull University in 1989. He completed a PhD at the University of Warwick in 1999; his thesis titled Flatline Constructs: Gothic Materialism and Cybernetic Theory-Fiction. During that time, he was a founding member of the interdisciplinary collective known as the Cybernetic Culture Research Unit, which was associated with accelerationist political thought and included philosophers such as Sadie Plant and Nick Land. There, he befriended and influenced producer Kode9 who later began the Hyperdub record label. In the early 1990s, Fisher also made music as part of the breakbeat hardcore group D-Generation, releasing the EPs Entropy in the UK and Concrete Island, and later Isle Of The Dead as The Lower Depths. In the 1990s he wrote "White Magic" for CritCrim.org.

After teaching philosophy at a further education college, Fisher began his blog on cultural theory, k-punk, in 2003. Music critic Simon Reynolds described it as "a one-man magazine superior to most magazines in Britain" and as the hub of a "constellation of blogs" in which popular culture, music, film, politics, and critical theory were discussed in tandem by journalists, academics, and colleagues. Vice magazine later said Fisher's writing on k-punk was "lucid and revelatory, taking literature, music and cinema we're familiar with and effortlessly disclosing its inner secrets". The Guardian contrasted it with his CCRU work, stating "The blog retained some Warwick traits, such as quoting reverently from Deleuze and Guattari, but it gradually shed the CCRU's aggressive rhetoric and pro-capitalist politics for a more forgiving, more left-leaning take on modernity." He used the blog as a more flexible, generative venue for writing, a respite from the frameworks and expectations of academic writing. He also co-founded the message board Dissensus with Matt Ingram, a writer.

== Career ==
In turn, Fisher was a visiting fellow and a lecturer on Aural and Visual Cultures at Goldsmiths College, a commissioning editor at Zero Books, an editorial board member of Interference: A Journal of Audio Culture and Edinburgh University Press's Speculative Realism series, and an acting deputy editor at The Wire. In 2009, he edited The Resistible Demise of Michael Jackson, a collection of critical essays on the career and death of Michael Jackson, and published Capitalist Realism: Is There No Alternative?, an analysis of the ideological effects of neoliberalism on contemporary culture.

Fisher was an early critic of call-out culture and in 2013 published a controversial essay titled "Exiting the Vampire Castle". He felt that call-out culture created a space "where solidarity is impossible, but guilt and fear are omnipresent". He went on to say that call-out culture reduces every political issue to criticizing the behaviour of individuals, instead of dealing with such political issues through collective action. In 2014, Fisher published Ghosts of My Life: Writings on Depression, Hauntology and Lost Futures, a collection of essays on similar themes viewed through the prisms of music, film, and hauntology. He contributed intermittently to a number of publications including the music magazines Fact and The Wire. In 2016, he co-edited a critical anthology on the post-punk era with Kodwo Eshun and Gavin Butt titled Post-Punk Then and Now, published by Repeater Books.

=== Capitalist realism ===
In the late 2000s, Fisher re-purposed the term "capitalist realism" to describe "the widespread sense that not only is capitalism the only viable political and economic system, but also that it is now impossible even to imagine a coherent alternative to it". He argued that the term best describes the ideological situation since the fall of the Soviet Union, in which the logics of capitalism have come to delineate the limits of political and social life, with significant effects on education, mental illness, pop culture, and methods of resistance. The result is a situation in which it is "easier to imagine an end to the world than an end to capitalism." He wrote:

Capitalist realism as I understand it... is more like a pervasive atmosphere, conditioning not only the production of culture but also the regulation of work and education, and acting as a kind of invisible barrier constraining thought and action.

As a philosophical concept, capitalist realism is influenced by the Althusserian conception of ideology, as well as the work of Fredric Jameson and Slavoj Žižek. Fisher also credited working in the public sector in Blairite Britain, as well as being a teacher and trade union activist, with making him see that "neoliberal capitalism didn't fit with the accelerationist model" but was instead creating the bureaucracy he describes in Capitalist Realism. The concept of capitalist realism stems from the concept of cultural hegemony proposed by Italian theorist Antonio Gramsci, which can generally be described as the notion that the "status quo" is all there is, and that anything else violates common sense itself.

According to capitalist realism, capitalists maintain their power not only through violence and force, but also by creating a pervasive sense that the capitalist system is all there is. They seek to maintain these conditions by dominating most social and cultural institutions. Fisher proposed that within a capitalist framework there is no space to conceive of alternative forms of social structures, adding that younger generations are not even concerned with recognizing alternatives. He said that the 2008 financial crisis compounded this position. Rather than catalyzing a desire to seek alternatives for the existing model, the response to the crisis reinforced the notion that modifications must be made within the existing system. Fisher states that capitalist realism has propagated a "business ontology" which concludes that everything should be run as a business including education and healthcare. Fisher has also stated that after the 2008 financial crisis, even the capitalist status quo seemed impossible, which he considered an improvement. After the publication of his work, the term was picked up by other literary critics.

=== Hauntology ===
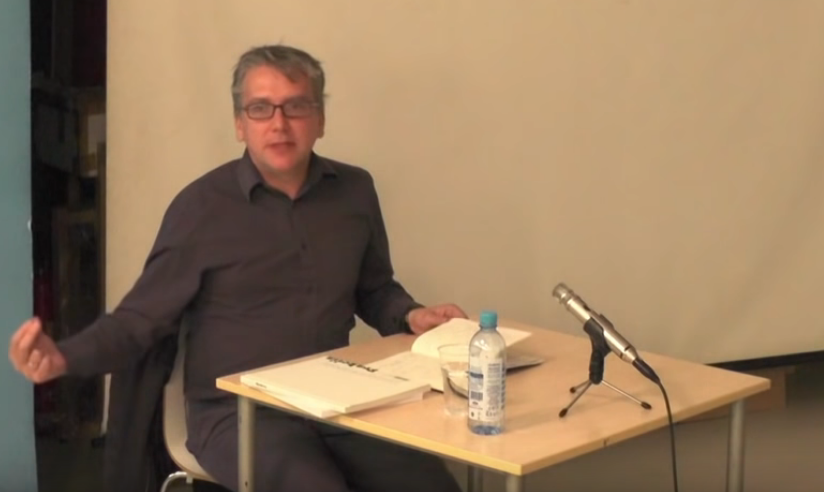
Fisher lecturing on the topic "The Slow Cancellation of the Future" in Zagreb, Croatia, May 2014

Fisher popularised the use of Jacques Derrida's concept of hauntology to describe a pervasive sense in which contemporary culture is haunted by the "lost futures" of modernity, which failed to occur or were cancelled by postmodernity and neoliberalism. Fisher and others drew attention to the shift into post-Fordist economies in the late 1970s, which he argued has "gradually and systematically deprived artists of the resources necessary to produce the new". In contrast to the nostalgia and ironic pastiche of postmodern culture, he defined hauntological art as exploring these impasses and representing a "refusal to give up on the desire for the future" and a "pining for a future that never arrived". Discussing the political relevance of the concept, he wrote:

At a time of political reaction and restoration, when cultural innovation has stalled and even gone backwards, when "power... operates predictively as much as retrospectively" (Eshun 2003: 289), one function of hauntology is to keep insisting that there are futures beyond postmodernity's terminal time. When the present has given up on the future, we must listen for the relics of the future in the unactivated potentials of the past.

Fisher and critic Simon Reynolds adapted Derrida's concept to describe a musical trend in the mid-2000s. Fisher's 2014 book Ghosts of My Life examined the idea through cultural sources including the music of Burial, Joy Division, and the Ghost Box label; TV series such as Sapphire & Steel, the films of Stanley Kubrick and Christopher Nolan, and the novels of David Peace and John le Carré.

=== The Weird and the Eerie ===
Fisher's posthumous book The Weird and the Eerie explores the titular concepts of "the weird" and "the eerie" through various works of art, defining the concepts as radical narrative modes or moments of "transcendental shock" which work to de-centre the human subject and de-naturalise social reality, exposing the arbitrary forces which shape it. Summarizing Fisher's characterizations, Yohann Koshy said that "weirdness abounds at the edge between worlds; eeriness radiates from the ruins of lost ones". The book includes discussion of science-fiction and horror sources like the writing of H. P. Lovecraft, Joan Lindsay's 1967 Picnic at Hanging Rock, and Philip K. Dick, films such as David Lynch's Inland Empire (2006) and Jonathan Glazer's Under the Skin (2013), and the music of UK post-punk band The Fall and ambient musician Brian Eno.

=== Acid Communism ===
At the time of his death, Fisher was said to be planning a new book titled Acid Communism, excerpts of which were published as part of a Mark Fisher anthology, k-punk: The Collected and Unpublished Writings of Mark Fisher (2004–2016), by Repeater Books in November 2018. Acid Communism would have attempted to reclaim elements of the 1960s counterculture and psychedelia in the interest of imagining new political possibilities for the Left.

=== On Vanishing Land ===
After Fisher's death, the Hyperdub record label began a sub label called Flatlines which published an audio-essay by Justin Barton and Fisher in July 2019. Fisher and Barton edited together music from various musicians which was made to accompany the text and Barton, working in part with suggestions from Fisher, wrote the text for the audio-essay which "evokes a walk along the Suffolk coastline in 2006, from Felixstowe container port ('a nerve ganglion of capitalism') to the Anglo-Saxon burial ground at Sutton Hoo". Both Barton and Fisher narrate the essay. Adam Harper wrote about the elements of hauntology in On Vanishing Land including its relation to the environmentalist movement. In a review for The Quietus, Johny Lamb referred to On Vanishing Land as a "shocking revelation of the proximity of dystopia."

=== Critique of political economy ===
Fisher critiqued economics, claiming that it was a bourgeois "science" which moulds reality after its presuppositions rather than critically examining reality:

From the start, "economy" was the object-cause of a bourgeois "science", which hyperstitionally bootstrapped itself into existence, and then bent and melted the matter of this and every other world to fit its presuppositions–the greatest theocratic achievement in a history that was never human, an immense conjuring trick which works all the better because it came shrouded in that damp grey English and Scottish empiricism which claimed to have seen off all gods.

== Death ==
Fisher died by suicide at his home on King Street, Felixstowe in Suffolk, England on 13 January 2017 at the age of 48, shortly before the publication of his latest book The Weird and the Eerie (2017). He had sought psychiatric treatment in the weeks leading up to his death, but his general practitioner had only been able to offer over-the-phone meetings to discuss a referral. Fisher's mental health had deteriorated since May 2016, leading to a suspected overdose in December 2016 when he was admitted to Ipswich Hospital.

He discussed his struggles with depression in articles and in his book Ghosts of My Life. According to Simon Reynolds in The Guardian, Fisher said that "the pandemic of mental anguish that afflicts our time cannot be properly understood, or healed, if viewed as a private problem suffered by damaged individuals."

== Legacy ==
Fisher has been posthumously acclaimed as a highly influential thinker and theorist. Commenting on Fisher's influence in Tribune, Alex Niven recalled that Fisher's "lucidity, but more than that, his ability to get to the heart of what was wrong with late-capitalist culture and right about the putative alternative...seemed to have cracked some ineffable code". In The Irish Times Rob Doyle wrote that "a more interesting British writer has not appeared in this century". The Guardian described Fisher's k-punk blog posts as "required reading for a generation".

In the Los Angeles Review of Books, Roger Luckhurst called Fisher "one of Britain's most trenchant, clear-sighted, and sparky cultural commentators...it is a catastrophe that we no longer have Mark Fisher".

After Fisher's suicide, English musician the Caretaker, whose music Fisher discussed in Ghosts of My Life and online writings, released Take Care. It's a Desert Out There... in memory of him, with its proceeds being donated to the mental health charity Mind.

Since 2018, "For k-punk" has been a yearly series of tribute events celebrating Fisher's life and works. In 2021, the ICA commissioned a series of films from different artists for the occasion to respond to themes in the volume Postcapitalist Desire (2020), which transcribes Fisher's final lecture series for his Master of Arts contemporary art theory course at Goldsmiths which is part of the University of London. The films have unifying visuals and captions by Sweatmother who was influenced through Fisher's work to use "early internet aesthetics and 1990s cyberpunk, merged with reworked empty promises of advertisements.”

Fisher has on numerous occasions been compared to Walter Benjamin by scholars of both. This partially stems from the fact that both Fisher and Benjamin died by suicide at 48 years of age and at-times explored similar ideas, concepts, and concerns. Both thinkers were deeply concerned about the commodification of art and culture, with Fisher expanding upon Benjamin's idea of left-wing melancholia in his work Exiting the Vampire Castle.

Konrad Kay, one of the two Oxford-educated creators of the HBO TV series Industry, has said he's been influenced by Fisher's writings, especially by his observation in ‘’Capitalist Realism‘’ that it “is easier to imagine an end of the world than it is to imagine an end of capitalism.” So it then follows, Kay believes, that “any product of capitalism has to be, on some level, a celebration of it.” And this seems to be true even of “Industry”’s scabrous, transactional depiction of the world of high finance.

A 65-minute "experimental documentary" film called We Are Making a Film About Mark Fisher was released in 2025. The film was self-funded by the artists Sophie Mellor and Simon Poulter, who used Instagram as a tool to find collaborators.

== Bibliography ==
- The Resistible Demise of Michael Jackson (editor). Winchester: Zero Books, 2009. ISBN 978-1-84694-348-5
- Capitalist Realism: Is There No Alternative? Winchester: Zero Books, 2009. ISBN 978-1-84694-317-1
- Ghosts of My Life: Writings on Depression, Hauntology and Lost Futures. Winchester: Zero Books, 2014. ISBN 978-1-78099-226-6
- Post-Punk Then and Now (editor, with Gavin Butt and Kodwo Eshun). London: Repeater Books, 2016. ISBN 978-1-910924-26-6
- The Weird and the Eerie. London: Repeater Books, 2017. ISBN 978-1-910924-38-9
- Flatline Constructs: Gothic Materialism and Cybernetic Theory-Fiction (foreword by exmilitary). New York: Exmilitary Press, 2018. ISBN 978-0-692-06605-8
- k-punk: The Collected and Unpublished Writings of Mark Fisher (2004–2016) (edited by Darren Ambrose, foreword by Simon Reynolds). London: Repeater Books, 2018. ISBN 978-1-912248-29-2
- Postcapitalist Desire: The Final Lectures (edited and with an introduction by Matt Colquhoun). London: Repeater Books, 2020. ISBN 978-1-913462-48-2
