= Purity test =

Self-graded survey assessing innocence

A purity test is a self-graded survey that assesses the participants' supposed degree of innocence in worldly matters (sex, drugs, deceit, and other activities assumed to be vices), generally on a percentage scale with 100% being the most and 0% being the least pure. Similar types of tests circulated under various names long before the existence of the Internet.

== History ==
The Rice Thresher student newspaper in 1924 published the results of an informal ten-question survey of 119 female undergraduate students at Rice University, with questions like "Have you ever been drunk?", "Did you ever dance conspicuously?", and "Have you ever done anything that you wouldn't tell your mother?" The test has periodically been revisited and revised by the Thresher, usually on its satirical "Backpage," with expanded lists of questions that students can take and score on their own, starting with a list of 150 questions in 1988. The newspaper's staff have held conflicting opinions on the test, but continue to publish it most years as of 2012.

The Independent reported in 2021 that Gen Z TikTok users were enthusiastic about a Rice purity test with 100 questions, noting that it was for entertainment and that "purity" can be a controversial concept. Student newspaper The Trail said of the test in 2024 that "Its continued popularity as a "harmless" viral trend among teens across the world has remained. Although the test may present itself as a fun way to get to know a friend or partner, it has extremely negative implications that uphold sexism, racism, and oppressive moral puritanism that should not be ignored."

As the purity test spread to other universities throughout the mid-20th century, they were documented by folklorists as a form of "questionnaire parody" reflecting evolving social norms.

The Columbia University humor magazine, The Jester, reported in its October 1935 issue on a campus wide "purity test" conducted at Barnard College in 1935. The issue of The Jester was briefly censored, with distribution curtailed until the director of activities at the university could review the article. According to the editor-in-chief of The Jester, "We printed the survey to clear up some of the misconceptions that Columbia and the outside world have about Barnard girls," he said. "The results seem to establish that Barnard girls are quite regular. I fail to see anything off-color in the story. It's a sociological study."

In 1936, The Indian Express reported that students at Toronto University were "under-going a 'purity test', which took "the form of twenty very personal questions, designed to determine the state of their morals and their 'purity ratio'. For example, so many marks are lost for smoking, drinking, and every time the sinner kisses a girl or boy. Then, after truthfully answering all the questions, the total number of bad marks are added up and subtracted from a hundred. What is left, if any, is the 'purity ratio'. The test is unofficial and just what it will prove when completed nobody knows."

Alan Dundes, a professor of anthropology and folklore at the University of California, Berkeley, and Carl R. Pagter included examples of purity tests in their 1975 book Work Hard and You Shall Be Rewarded: Urban Folklore from the Paperwork Empire. They noted, "An indication of the particular sexual activities that are valued is provided by various versions of a questionnaire parody entitled 'Virtue Test' or 'Official Purity Test' or the like. It is obviously doubtful whether anyone would answer the questions posed on the test in an honest and truthful fashion. Nevertheless, the questions themselves serve to reveal a good deal about the American male's sexual fantasy life." Dundes and Pagter's book reprints a "Virtue Test" circulated at Indiana University in 1939 and a more contemporary "Official Purity Test" circulated at California Institute of Technology.

In 1976, a teacher at La Grange High School in Texas was fired for distributing a 1966 purity test, which had appeared in the Ask Ann Landers column, to her students. The questions on the test ranged from "Ever said 'I love you'?" to "Ever had group sex?" The teacher sued the school district and was awarded $71,000 in back pay and damages.

Purity tests started to be shared online around 1980, and the first web-based test came in 1994.

== Description ==
A purity test generally consists of a number of questions with yes-no answers. Answering them produces a percentage, the score or "purity number". The lower the score, the lower "purity." The number of questions varies, 100 is not uncommon.
