= Capitalist realism =

Term for commodity-based art

- Years active: From Pop Art in the 1950s and 1960s to the commodity art of the 1980s and 1990s
- Location: Germany
- Major figures: Michael Schudson, Mark Fisher, Gerhard Richter, Sigmar Polke, Wolf Vostell, and Konrad Lueg

The term "capitalist realism" has been used, particularly in Germany, to describe commodity-based art, from Pop Art in the 1950s and 1960s to the commodity art of the 1980s and 1990s. When used in this way, it is a play on the term "socialist realism". Alternatively, it has been used to describe the ideological-aesthetic aspect of contemporary corporate capitalism in the Western world.

== In art ==
Although attested earlier, the phrase "capitalist realism" was first used in the title of the 1963 art exhibition in Düsseldorf, Demonstration for Capitalist Realism, which featured the work of Gerhard Richter, Sigmar Polke, Wolf Vostell, and Konrad Lueg. The exhibition's participants focused upon depictions of Germany's growing consumer culture and media-saturated society with strategies, in part, influenced by those of their American Pop counterparts. In May 1963 the exhibition Living with Pop: A Demonstration for Capitalist Realism took place in the furniture showroom Berges in Düsseldorf. For this 'demonstration' Gerhard Richter and Konrad Lueg hung their works alongside furniture showcased on plinths and presented themselves as artworks.

== Sigmar Polke ==
Capitalist realism is a German art movement co-founded in 1963 by artist Sigmar Polke. Polke embraced the advertising and publicity commonly found in the popular press in renderings of everyday consumer items. Often ironic and with critical overtones of society and politics, the Capitalist Realism movement is considered more explicitly political than conventional Pop Art.

== Michael Schudson ==
In the mid-1980s, Michael Schudson used the term "capitalist realism" to describe mainstream practices in advertising. Chapter seven of Schudson's Advertising: The Uneasy Persuasion compares the messages and appeals of advertising to those found in the Socialist Realism of the Soviet Union. In his account, the realism of advertising promotes a way of life based on private consumption, rather than social, public achievement.

== Mark Fisher ==
The term next appeared in 2009 with the publication of Mark Fisher's book Capitalist Realism: Is There No Alternative?. Fisher argues that the term "capitalist realism" best describes the current global political situation, which lacks visible alternatives to the capitalist system which became dominant following the fall of the Soviet Union. His argument is a response to, and critique of, neoliberalism and new forms of government which apply the logic of capitalism and the market to all aspects of governance.

His ideology refers to a perceived "widespread sense that not only is capitalism the only viable political and economic system, but also that it is now impossible even to imagine a coherent alternative to it".

As a philosophical concept, capitalist realism is influenced by the Althusserian conception of ideology. Fisher proposes that within a capitalist framework there is no space to conceive of alternative forms of social structures, adding that younger generations are not even concerned with recognizing alternatives. He proposes that the 2008 financial crisis compounded this position. Rather than catalyzing a desire to seek alternatives to the existing model, the crisis reinforced the notion that modifications must be made within the existing system. Rather than shake it loose from its foundations, the crash confirmed to the populace the necessity of capitalism.

Capitalist realism as I understand it cannot be confined to art or to the quasi-propagandistic way in which advertising functions. It is more like a pervasive atmosphere, conditioning not only the production of culture but also the regulation of work and education, and acting as a kind of invisible barrier constraining thought and action.

Fisher argues that "capitalist realism has successfully installed a 'business ontology' in which it is simply obvious that everything in society, including healthcare and education, should be run as a business" (cf. New Public Management).

Following the publication of Fisher's work, the term has been picked up by other literary critics.

The term has also been used by Japanese scholar Yoshifusa Ichii to characterize the way that the International Olympic Committee and its stakeholders, along with the Japanese state, took advantage of the 2020 Summer Olympics in Tokyo and the COVID-19 pandemic in order to further expand capitalist profits, state power, and national mobilization. Ichii combines Fisher's capitalist realism with Jules Boykoff's "celebration capitalism" to explain that "the celebration capitalism of the Olympics reinforces capitalist realism by creating a state of exception, which maximizes the flow of capital while invoking the biopolitics of a “new lifestyle” that echoes wartime slogans of national mobilization."

== See also ==
- Real capital
- Socialist realism
- Social realism
