= Grand Canyon Suite =

Suite for orchestra by Ferde Grofé

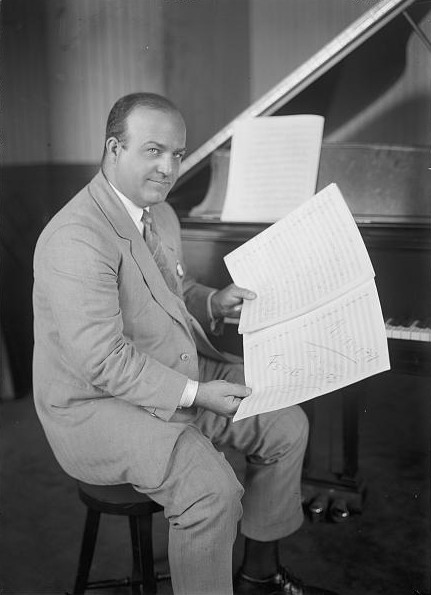
Ferde Grofé in 1925

The Grand Canyon Suite is a suite for orchestra by Ferde Grofé, composed between 1929 and 1931. It was initially titled Five Pictures of the Grand Canyon.

It consists of five movements, each an evocation in tone of a particular scene typical of the Grand Canyon. Paul Whiteman and His Orchestra gave the first public performance of the work, in concert at the Studebaker Theatre in Chicago on November 22, 1931.

Grofe, in 1937, described the genesis of his piece:

Although I was born in New York City, I lost all consciousness of being a New Yorker at the age of five. From that age till a few years ago, I lived in California.... In writing "Grand Canyon Suite" I drew from notes I had made during my constant visits to the rim of the mighty work of nature. I had watched the Canyon in all seasons, in all its moods. And my findings were on paper, notes in hieroglyphics that were later transcribed into musical notes.

== Structure ==
The movements of the suite are:

1. Sunrise
2. Painted Desert
3. On the Trail
4. Sunset
5. Cloudburst

== Instrumentation ==
The work is scored for three flutes (third doubling piccolo), two oboes, English horn, two clarinets, bass clarinet, two bassoons, contrabassoon, four horns, three trumpets, two tenor trombones, bass trombone, tuba, timpani, triangle, small cymbal, bass drum, cymbals, snare drum, vibraphone, gong, coconut shells, bells, chime, wind machine, piano, celesta, harp, and strings.

== Influence ==
Grand Canyon is a 1958 short Walt Disney film in CinemaScope format directed by James Algar. It features color film footage of the Grand Canyon accompanied by the Grand Canyon Suite, though the order of the movements has been somewhat altered. In the manner of Fantasia, there is no story and no dialogue. The film won an Academy Award in 1959 for Best Short Subject.

On the Trail has been used as the soundtrack for the Grand Canyon Diorama on the Santa Fe & Disneyland Railroad in Disneyland since the diorama's 1958 debut.

On the Trail was the theme music for commercials for Philip Morris cigarettes on US radio and television from 1934 until sometime in the 1960s, accompanied by the voice of Johnny Roventini calling "Call for Philip Morris" in the style of a hotel bellhop paging a customer. This movement is also used extensively in the Bob Clark film A Christmas Story, with the celesta solo providing the soundtrack music when Ralphie and his younger brother are seen sleeping and dreaming about Christmas morning.

Painted Desert, Sunrise and Sunset were sampled by The Caretaker for the tracks "C4 - Glimpses of hope in trying times", "D1 - I still feel as though I am me" and "D5 - The way ahead feels lonely" in Everywhere at the End of Time. Furthermore, Cloudburst was sampled for "Lonely way ahead" in Everywhere, an Empty Bliss.

== Recordings ==
Paul Whiteman and His Orchestra recorded the movements of the suite in three studio sessions on April 26, April 27, and April 28, 1932, for RCA Victor at their studios in Camden, New Jersey. The suite was released on eight 78 rpm record sides (eight single-sided records/four two-sided records) in 1932.

The work has been recorded many times since, with performances by American orchestras conducted by Arturo Toscanini, Arthur Fiedler, Morton Gould, Howard Hanson, Eugene Ormandy, Felix Slatkin, Leonard Bernstein, Maurice Abravanel, Andre Kostelanetz, Antal Doráti, Erich Kunzel, Lorin Maazel, and Gerard Schwarz. Performances by non-American ensembles are much rarer, with a recording by the London Festival Orchestra under Stanley Black notable among them.
