= We, So Tired of All the Darkness in Our Lives =

- Ivan Seal Com Push

Studio album by Leyland Kirby
- Released: 28 September 2017
- Genre: Electronic
- Length: 94:06
- Label: History Always Favours the Winners

Leyland Kirby chronology
Intrigue & Stuff (2014)	We, So Tired of All the Darkness in Our Lives (2017)	We are in the Shadow of a Distant Fire (2022)

We, So Tired of All the Darkness in Our Lives is the fifth studio album by English musician Leyland Kirby, released on 28 September 2017. An electronic album, it features melancholic and gothic elements. It was produced the same time as Stage 4, and released the same day as Stage 3, of Kirby's album series under the Caretaker moniker, Everywhere at the End of Time. We, So Tired of All the Darkness in Our Lives contrasts from the Caretaker's work in that it is more positive; aspects such as drums mimicking a sound of marching are present. The album's title is a reference to the Joe Jackson song Steppin' Out.

We, So Tired of All the Darkness in Our Lives was described by Kirby as not needing to be aggressive. Its liner notes also presented Kirby's dissatisfaction with big streaming services; the album is free to download. It featured a music video for the ending track, "Back in the game". The record received a general positive reception from music critics, who felt its more positive style was needed in 2017.

== Background ==
Leyland Kirby is an English electronic musician known for his work under the Caretaker alias, which explores memory and its deterioration. His albums under the moniker manipulate big band records to reflect disorders such as anterograde amnesia and Alzheimer's disease. While it started with inspiration of a ballroom scene from horror film The Shining, it later ended with drones of Stage 6 from the album series Everywhere at the End of Time, which depicts the stages of dementia. The Caretaker's breakthrough album, An Empty Bliss Beyond This World gained attention from music critics; it would later inspire Kirby to create Everywhere. On 28 September 2017, the Caretaker released Stage 3 of Everywhere at the End of Time. Along with it, Kirby released We, So Tired of All the Darkness in Our Lives under his own name.

== Composition and production ==
We, So Tired of All the Darkness in Our Lives is an electronic album. It features a sound with drums and piano which Luke Turner of The Quietus described as all the sounds one hears when "drunk, wept over, grieving and bleakly euphoric, like rolling over onto the other side of a bed still warm from a lover just departed for good." The record has a melancholic style that contrasts from its track titles, such as "Rotten rave tropes", "Clickbait", and "Sickly strawberry nostalgia". Negative track titles such as "Momentum is not on our side", which Fact's critic Miles Bowe called poetic, contrast with other, more positive ones, such as "Back in the game". Their gothic style is emphasized by the album cover, which shows a phone and a flower. This painting, by longtime collaborator Ivan Seal, was also used as the cover of Kirby's 2014 album We Drink to Forget the Coming Storm. Bowe felt the record offered a more positive side to Kirby's music, in contrast to the aggressive sound of the Caretaker alias. Its drums and synths, mimicking a sound of marching, were described by him as finding "quiet strength and immense beauty".

The album was produced the same time as Stage 4 of his at the time ongoing album series Everywhere at the End of Time. According to Kirby, the "audio dementia experiments" made him isolated from the world. The musician added that the record released under his own name presents a new perspective and "production value" to works of his that were previously archived. Its tracks are what Kirby has listened to the most since the release of Patience (After Sebald). He described their elements as more focused, indicating "early influences." They are themed around the idea that Kirby's music shouldn't be aggressive to "show defiance." He added that potential listeners may find tracks that give solace, "hit home", or "help here and there."

== Release and reception ==
The album was released on 28 September 2017. This was the same day Kirby released Stage 3 of Everywhere at the End of Time. On 19 September 2017, nine days before the album's release, Kirby uploaded a music video for "Back in the game" on YouTube. It featured Kirby doing a performance where he'd fall off stairs at the Krakow Barbican. Kirby expressed great dissatisfaction with the music industry at the date, stating streaming services, contrary to his belief of "true independent music", are "constant[ly] devaluing" music. The musician wrote he does not produce music to "push cans of energy drink or to look for cheap clicks on playlists or to get involved in scenes." The record is free to download; according to Kirby, this is not because he does not value his work, but rather because he "mean[s] it." Kirby concluded, "If it’s not released now then this work just sits on a drive for even longer gathering digital dust which I feel is a shame."

The record was met with positive reception from music critics. Writing for The Quietus, Luke Turner stated that records such as these, along with Kirby's "generosity of spirit", is what will "help us through this rum age." Critic Miles Bowe chose the album for the accolade "Bandcamp Release Of The Month" in September 2017 due to being "a glimmer of light in the middle of his bleak series and an even bleaker world around us." Bowe cited it as an important release of Kirby's career as a musician. It was also mentioned The Quietus as one of the "Albums Of The Month".

== Track listing ==
No.	Title	Length
1.	"A1 - Consolation"	4:38
2.	"A2 - Momentum Is Not on Our Side"	6:06
3.	"A3 - Oblivion of Experiences"	7:33
4.	"A4 - Rotten Rave Tropes"	4:00
5.	"B1 - Rain Drenched"	4:34
6.	"B2 - Dig Deep, March On"	6:03
7.	"B3 - Positive Outcome"	4:33
8.	"B4 - Drowning in the Quagmire"	9:20
9.	"C1 - Clickbait"	7:06
10.	"C2 - Plastic False World"	7:18
11.	"C3 - Collected Light"	4:00
12.	"C4 - Solid Mentality"	4:35
13.	"D1 - Tinseltown"	5:10
14.	"D2 - Bursts of Anxiety"	8:24
15.	"D3 - Sickly Strawberry nostalgia"	4:50
16.	"D4 - Back in the Game"	5:56
Total length:		94:06

== Personnel ==
Adapted from Bandcamp.

- Leyland Kirby – production
- Ivan Seal – album cover
- Stephan Mathieu – mastering
