= Everywhere, an Empty Bliss =

2019 compilation album by the Caretaker

- Ivan Seal, Pm, Why Bees Are Very Silent (2019), oil on canvas

Compilation album by the Caretaker
- Released: 26 February 2019
- Genre: Ambient; hauntology
- Length: 49:32
- Label: History Always Favours the Winners; FRAC Auvergne
- Compiler: Leyland Kirby

The Caretaker chronology
Everywhere at the End of Time - Stage 5 (2018)	Everywhere, an Empty Bliss (2019)	Everywhere at the End of Time - Stage 6 (2019)

Everywhere, an Empty Bliss (stylized as “Everywhere, an empty bliss”) is the twelfth release by the Caretaker, an alias of English musician Leyland Kirby. Released on 26 February 2019, the record is compiled from archived tracks that were meant to be used on the Caretaker's albums. Before finishing his album series Everywhere at the End of Time, Kirby released the album as "a surprise golden farewell".

Consisting of outtakes from Everywhere at the End of Time, the album was promoted by a French art exhibition. Following the album's release, Kirby performed in 2019 and 2020 for promotion. He claimed the record would be free to download until June 2019, but as of 2026, it is currently still available for free. Everywhere, an Empty Bliss met praise from music critics because of its content related to dementia.

== Background ==
The Caretaker was an alias of English musician Leyland Kirby, who manipulated big band songs. Inspired by the film The Shining (1980), the pseudonym's first releases were heavily influenced by the movie's haunted ballroom scene. However, Kirby later moved on to explore memory loss through Theoretically Pure Anterograde Amnesia (2005). Shifting record labels, Persistent Repetition of Phrases (2008) changed from V/Vm Test to History Always Favours the Winners. The album featured a change in concept from previous records; rather than amnesia, it depicts Alzheimer's disease. Along with the Caretaker's first releases, the album was mentioned by Fact as a "modern classic" of Kirby's music. The Caretaker broke through the ambient scene with An Empty Bliss Beyond This World (2011).

After five years without any releases, Kirby announced that he would be "giving the alias dementia" with an album series titled Everywhere at the End of Time (2016–2019). The series explored the disorder and attempted to portray it through six stages, with Stage 1 consisting of ballroom music loops and Stage 6 consisting of heavily distorted music combined with white noise. It would later be misinterpreted by music publications, draw comparisons to the Brexit process, and inspire other musicians to create music influenced by experiences with patients. Alongside the final album of the series, Everywhere, an Empty Bliss was released, according to Kirby, as "a surprise golden farewell". He added that it is:

"one last chance to raise a charged glass for those we lost along the way, for all the works, for those ghosts from our past, for our uncertain future and for the Caretaker."

== Composition ==
Mastered by musician Stephan Mathieu, Everywhere, an Empty Bliss combines the titles of Everywhere at the End of Time and An Empty Bliss Beyond This World. The record is compiled from tracks that were meant to be used on these albums. It presents a movie-like texture with nostalgic sounds of vinyl crackle. Like on Everywhere at the End of Time, the music gets more distorted as the album progresses, also reflecting dementia. However, this is done in miniature in contrast to the six-hour runtime of the album series. Like the series, the album also features a range of emotions, from joyful to hauntological.

The album is most similar to the compositions of Stage 3. On "Losing Battle of Loss", the melancholy settles in the album. This is contrasted by "All Eyes Bewildered", which features a music box song that is actually quite similar to Everywhere's "E7 - Bewildered in other eyes". "Losing Loss of Battle" repeats "Losing Battle of Loss", and by "Plaque Advanced Despair" the music struggles to have a coherent melody.

The record presents lyrical content within some of its tracks. On "Glimpses of Life Denial", a woman recites a Santa Claus song to a group of kids. "Benjamin Beyond Bliss" features a sample of a song by piano duo Layton & Johnstone that is manipulated so that only small parts of the voice are recognizable. It features garbled words, akin to a destroyed intercom. By "Dusk Memory Fraction", a man singing in French can be heard.

== Artwork and release ==
The artwork was created by Kirby's long-time friend Ivan Seal. The arts of Seal and the music of Kirby were included on a French exhibition that occurred in 2019, done by the public regional collection of contemporary art FRAC Auvergne. Named after Everywhere, an Empty Bliss, it presented Kirby's music and names for the paintings used as the album covers. In the exhibition, a CD edition of Everywhere, an Empty Bliss and a booklet consisting of Seal's paintings were also present. The company released a YouTube promotional video announcing that their exhibition would happen from 6 April to 6 June 2019. Seal's art was also featured near one of Kirby's live performances in 2019, on an exhibition titled Cukuwruums. Searching for uncommon venues, a signature mark of the festival, the organizers found an abandoned apartment from 2014. Seal felt that "nothing should be cleared up—there would be no brushing up". First built as a part of the performance, the exhibition remained open later. The title of its artwork, Pm, Why Bees Are Very Silent (2019), is an anagram of the album's name. The record's CD edition presents a different part of the painting used as the album cover on the digital edition.

Kirby's last work as the Caretaker, Everywhere, an Empty Bliss was released on 14 March 2019, alongside Stage 6 of the album series. Kirby claimed the album would be available for free on his Bandcamp until 16 June of that year. However, as of April 2026, the record is still available for free. To promote the album and his album series, Kirby performed at two music festivals: the "Solidarity" show of the Unsound Festival in May 2019, and the "[Re]setting" Rewire Festival in 2020, which would occur in April at The Hague.

== Critical reception ==
Everywhere, an Empty Bliss received general praise from music critics for its dementia-related topics. Hayden Menzies, drummer of band Metz, wrote for Bandcamp Daily that the album "is kind of terrifying for a lot of people and understandably so". He added that the record is "worth a listen, but don't be prepared to come out feeling very good after". Richard Allen of website A Closer Listen felt that, along with the album series, the release "offers dignity to those suffering from the disease, as well as encouragement to caregivers". He called them "a definitive statement". However, reviewing the album series for Spectrum Culture, Holly Hazelwood stated that it can "seem excessive to want to listen to another 40 minutes of [the] Caretaker's music" following "six-and-a-half hours within the sound of someone losing the fundamental building blocks of who they are".

Along with Everywhere at the End of Time, Everywhere, an Empty Bliss ranked fourth on A Closer Listen's top releases of the 2010s listing.

== Track listing ==
Digital and French CD listings adapted from Bandcamp and Boomkat respectively.

Digital version
No.	Title	Length
1.	"Loss of want back there"	5:20
2.	"I might be vanishing"	0:09
3.	"Empty beyond beyond beyond"	1:22
4.	"Losing battle of loss"	2:40
5.	"Advanced plaque camaraderie"	3:05
6.	"All eyes bewildered"	3:24
7.	"Glimpses of life denial"	2:36
8.	"Equinox eyes will stop"	2:59
9.	"Losing loss of battle"	2:38
10.	"Plaque advanced despair"	2:55
11.	"Benjamin beyond bliss"	1:06
12.	"Drifting sublime hope"	3:35
13.	"Minimal all you are"	3:38
14.	"Internal unravel"	3:38
15.	"Dusk memory fraction"	3:00
16.	"Entanglement synapse ache"	3:23
17.	"And bliss everywhere bliss"	3:57
Total length:		49:32

French CD version
No.	Title	Length
1.	"An empty everywhere"	1:50
2.	"I might be vanishing"	0:10
3.	"My heart is true"	3:26
4.	"Losing battle of loss"	2:40
5.	"Advanced plaque camaraderie"	3:06
6.	"All eyes bewildered"	3:25
7.	"Glimpses of life denial"	2:37
8.	"Lonely way ahead"	2:59
9.	"Losing loss of battle"	2:38
10.	"Plaque advanced despair"	2:55
11.	"Benjamin beyond bliss"	1:06
12.	"Drifting sublime hope"	3:35
13.	"Hidden minimal sea"	3:38
14.	"Internal unravel"	3:38
15.	"Dusk memory fraction"	3:01
16.	"I might be vanishing"	0:10
17.	"Elusive Sunshine"	3:07
Total length:		44:01

== Personnel ==
Adapted from YouTube.

- The Caretaker – "remembering and disfiguring" of the audio
- Leyland Kirby – compilation
- Ivan Seal – album covers
- Stephan Mathieu – aural mastering

== Release history ==
Release formats for Everywhere, an Empty Bliss
Region	Release date	Label	Format	Ref.
Worldwide	14 March 2019	History Always Favours the Winners	Digital download	
Worldwide	4 April 2019	FRAC Auvergne	CD	
