= William Utermohlen =

American artist (1933–2007)

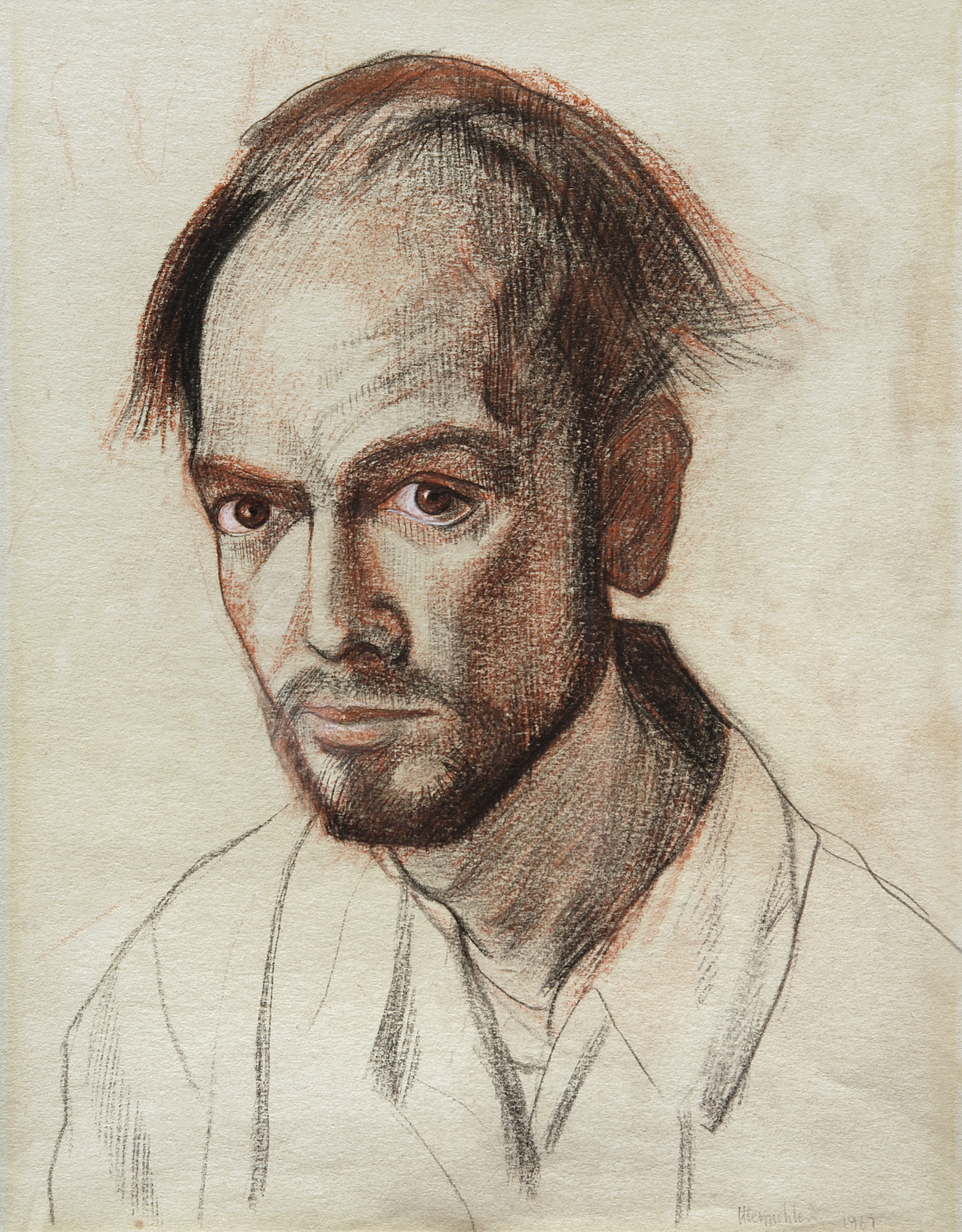
- Self-portrait, mixed media on paper, 1967
- Born: William Charles Utermohlen; December 5, 1933; South Philadelphia, Pennsylvania, U.S.
- Died: March 21, 2007 (aged 73); London, England
- Citizenship: United States (until 1992); United Kingdom (from 1992)
- Education: Philadelphia Academy of Fine Arts
- Years active: 1957–2002
- Known for: Drawing self-portraits after his diagnosis of probable Alzheimer's disease
- Spouse: Patricia Redmond (m. 1965) (Note: Sources differ on the date of Utermohlen and Redmond's marriage. For example, NBC and New Statesman claim that they married the same year they met.)

William Charles Utermohlen (December 5, 1933 – March 21, 2007) was an American and British figurative artist known for his late-period self-portraits completed after his diagnosis of probable Alzheimer's disease. He was diagnosed in 1995, having had progressive memory loss since 1991. After diagnosis, he began a series of self-portraits influenced by both the figurative painter Francis Bacon and cinematographers from the German Expressionism movement. The last of his self-portraits was completed c. 2001, some six years before his death.

Born to first-generation German immigrants in South Philadelphia, Utermohlen earned a scholarship at the Philadelphia Academy of Fine Arts (PAFA) in 1951. After completing military service, he spent 1953 studying in Europe where he was inspired by Renaissance and Baroque artists. He moved to London in 1962 and married the art historian Patricia Redmond in 1965. He relocated to Massachusetts in 1972 to teach art at Amherst College before returning to London in 1975. His early work consists of separate six cycles, each of which covers themes and subject matter ranging from mythology to war to nudes.

Most of Utermohlen's life was spent in obscurity. His later works began to attract attention at the beginning of the 21st century. His self-portraits especially are seen as important in the understanding of the gradual effects of neurocognitive disorders, and have become some of the most well-recognised works of art about Alzheimer's. His late paintings have been widely displayed since his story became known in popular medicine literature.

== Early life ==
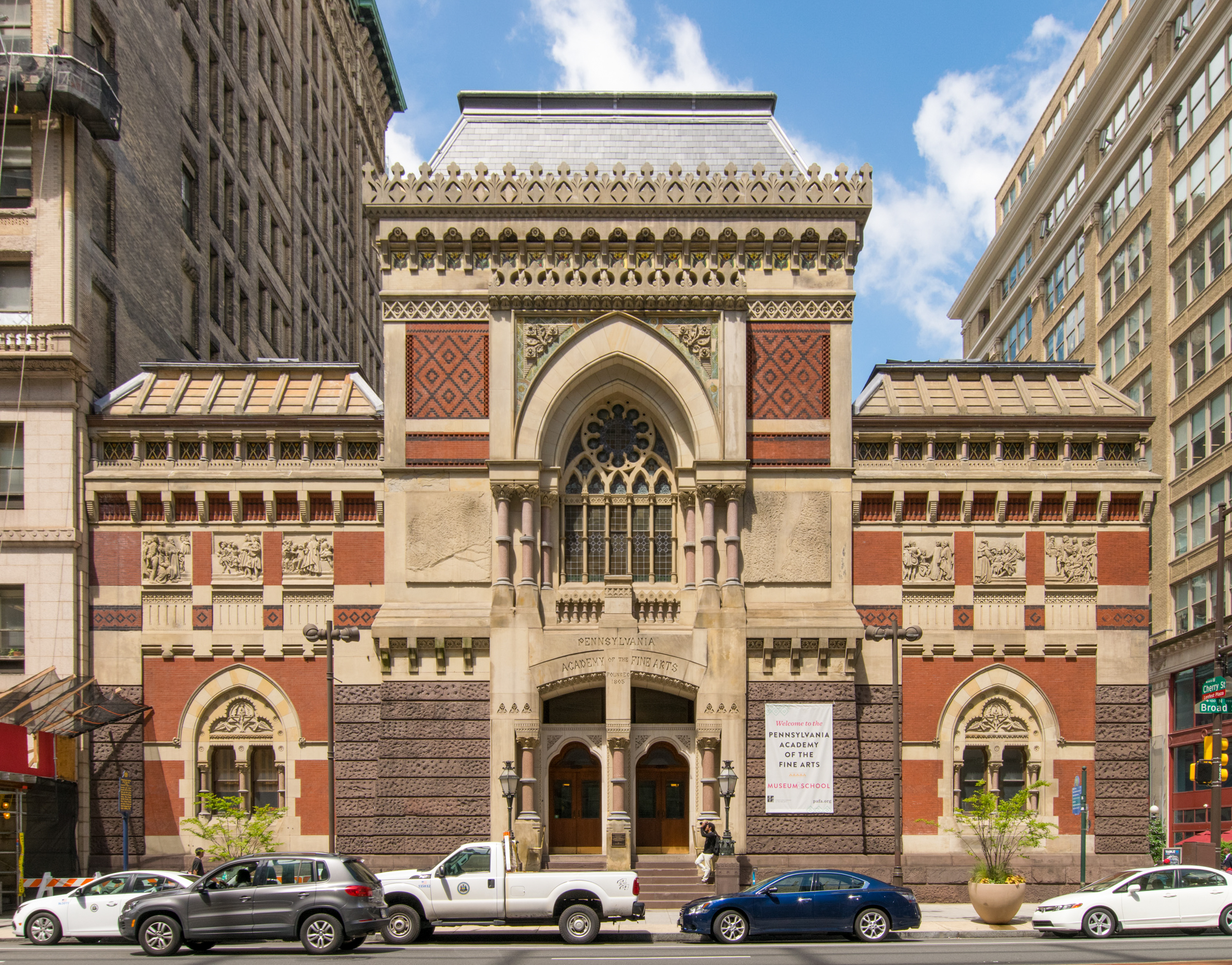
Utermohlen was educated and received his scholarship at the Pennsylvania Academy of Fine Arts (PAFA).

William Charles Utermohlen was born on December 5, 1933, in Southern Philadelphia, Pennsylvania, as the only child of first-generation German immigrants. At the time, the area was split along language lines; his family lived on Hicks Street in the German-speaking part of the city, but the Germans that lived there migrated further across the US, which resulted in them living in an Italian bloc. Utermohlen's parents did not allow him to venture outside of his immediate surrounding; the art critic Manu Sharma speculates that, by making Utermohlen look inwards, such protectiveness had an influence on his artistic development.

Utermohlen earned a scholarship at the Pennsylvania Academy of the Fine Arts (PAFA) in 1951 where he studied under the realist artist Walter Stuempfig. He completed his military service in 1953, following two years in the Caribbean. Shortly after, he studied in Europe, traveling through Italy, France and Spain where he was heavily influenced by the works of the Proto-Renaissance artist Giotto and the French Baroque painter Nicolas Poussin. He graduated from PAFA in 1957 and moved to England, in part because he was attracted to the London art scene. Utermohlen's wife, the art historian Patricia Redmond, (Note: In the Illinois Wesleyan University's chronology of Utermohlen's life, they listed her surname as Haynes.) said that "when he was at art school, he was very pretty, and he was chased around by all the homosexual tutors and everybody else ... he didn't care but he didn't fancy them. When he came to England he discovered, amazingly, because the English had always been like this, that we quite liked girlish men."

Utermohlen attended the Ruskin School of Art at the University of Oxford between 1957 and 1959, while he was on the G.I. Bill. There he met the American artist R. B. Kitaj, whose pop art works had influenced Utermohlen. After Oxford, he returned to the U.S. for three years. He moved to London in 1962 where he met Redmond, whom he married in 1965. In 1969, his artwork was featured in an exhibition at the Marlborough Gallery. He taught art at Amherst College in Massachusetts from 1972, where he spent his last year as an artist-in-residence. In 1975, Redmond received her master degree at Massachusetts, after which they had again returned to London, eventually gaining British nationality in 1992.

== Style ==
His early works are mostly figurative, and described by the medical academic James M. Stubenrauch as "exuberant, at times surrealistic" style of expressionism. During the late 1970s, in response to the photorealist movement, he printed photographs onto a canvas and painting directly over them. Examples of this technique include his 1997 Self-Portrait (Split) and two portraits of Redmond.

During this period, Utermohlen did not explain his work or discuss them with Redmond as she was an art historian, and he feared she would interfere with his creative progress. Redmond believes he was "absolutely right" in this approach as she would likely have highlighted faults in his work.

Regarding Utermohlen's art style, Redmond said to The New York Times that "he was never quite in the same time slot with what was going on. Everybody was Abstract expressionist, [while] he was solemnly drawing the figure." She explained in a Studio 360 interview that Utermohlen was "puzzled and worried, because he couldn't work in [a] totally abstract way", as he considered the figure "incredibly important". His art is mainly centered on portraiture, although Utermohlen has also made murals at the Royal Free Hospital and at the Liberal Jewish Synagogue.

=== Six cycles ===
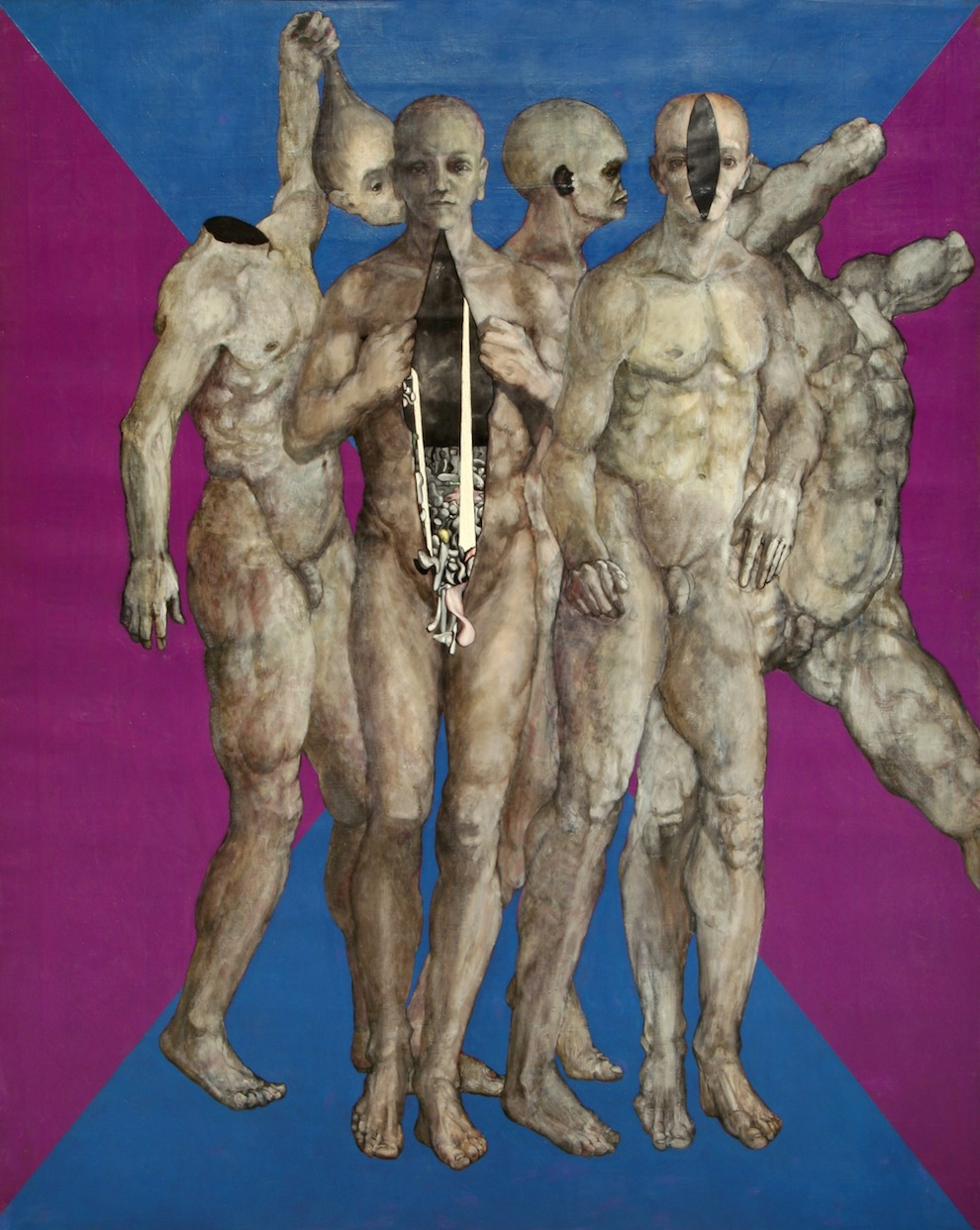
The Schizmatics (Canto XXVIII), which was created in 1966, is one of the paintings in Utermohlen's Cantos series.

Most of his early paintings can be grouped into six cycles: Mythological (1962–1963), Cantos (or Dante) (1964–1966), Mummers (1969–1970), War (1972–1973), Nudes (1973–1974), (Note: Although his earliest Nudes date to 1953, he produced most of the works between 1973 and 1974.) and Conversation (1989–1991).

The Dante cycle is named after and inspired by Dante's Inferno. The cycle conflicted with the optimistic mood of the 1960s due to its reference to medieval literature, according to The Wall Street International, who simultaneously cites the Dante cycle as making him into a mature and committed figurative artist.

The War series references the Vietnam War; and according to Redmond the inclusion of isolated soldiers represented his feelings of being an outsider in the art scene.

Both the Mummers and Conversations series are based on early memories; the former, completed between 1968 and 1970, is based on the Mummers Parade of Philadelphia, of which Utermohlen wasn't allowed by his parents to participate in. In a letter from November 1970, Utermohlen stated that the cycle was created as a "vehicle for expressing my anxiety".

The Conversations paintings were described by Polini as an attempt to describe his life before memory loss. Pre-dating his diagnosis, they already indicated the onset of a number of symptoms. Titles such as W9 and Maida Vale reference the names of the district and neighborhood, respectively, that he lived in at the time. The artworks contain saturated colors and "engaging spatial arrangements", which highlight the actions of the people in the artworks. Tobi Zausner likened the perspectives and spatial arrangements of the Conversation pieces to the work of M. C. Escher.

== Alzheimer's and later works ==
Head I (2000) is one of Utermohlen's last recognizable self-portraits. According to Redmond, it shows his "efforts to explain his altered self, his fears and his sadness".

Utermohlen experienced memory loss while working on the Conversation series. This included inability to wrap his necktie or to find his apartment. He had issues with speech and knowing the time of day. Utermohlen rarely depicted himself in the Conversation series, and in one of these few depictions, in Snow, Utermohlen showed himself as isolated from the group of five people at the table. Tobi Zausner believes that this was a representation of Utermohlen's struggles with verbally communicating when he was painting Snow. Between 1993 and 1994, he produced a series of lithographs depicting short stories by World War I poet Wilfred Owen. The figures are more still and mask-like than the Conversation pieces. They consist of a series of disoriented and wounded soldiers, and are described by his art dealer Chris Boicos as a seeming premonition of the artist's dementia diagnosis made in the following year. By this time, he often forgot his teaching appointments.

In 1994, he was commissioned for a family portrait. Around one year later, Redmond took his client to Utermohlen's studio to see the progress, but saw that the portrait had not advanced since their last viewing nine months earlier. She feared Utermohlen was depressed and sought medical advice, where he was subsequently diagnosed with probable Alzheimer's disease in August 1995 at the age of 61. An MRI scan that was done in November left little doubt about this diagnosis, showing pronounced cerebral atrophy. He was sent to the Queen's Square Hospital where a nurse, Ron Isaacs, became interested in his drawings and asked him to start drawing self-portraits. As each self-portrait was completed, Utermohlen would show it to Isaacs, where he would photograph it. The first, Blue Skies, was completed between 1994 and 1995, before his diagnosis, and shows him gripping a yellow table in an empty, sparsely described interior. When his neuropsychologist Sebastian Crutch visited Utermohlen in late 1999, he described the painting as depicting the artist trying to hang on and avoid being "swept out" of the open window above. Polini likened the depiction of him holding onto the table to a painter holding onto his canvas, saying that "[i]n order to survive, he must be able to capture this catastrophic moment; he must depict the unspeakable." Blue Skies became Utermohlen's last "large scale" painting.

That year's sketch, A Welcoming Man, shows a disassembled figure that seems to represent his loss of spatial perception. Regarding the sketch, Crutch et al stated that "[Utermohlen] acknowledged that there was a problem with the sketch, but did not know what the problem was nor how it could be rectified." He began a series of self-portraits after his diagnosis in 1995. The earliest, the Masks series, are in watercolor and were completed between 1994 and 2001. His last non-self-portrait dates 1997, and is of Redmond, titled by Patrice Polini as Pat (Artist's Wife).

=== Death ===
Utermohlen had retired from painting by December 2000, could no longer draw in 2002, and was in the care of the Princess Louise nursing home in 2004. He died of pneumonia at the Hammersmith Hospital on March 21, 2007, aged 73.

== Later work ==
=== Self-portraits ===
On the creation of his self portraits

[Dementia] makes me anxious because I like to produce good work and I know good work, but it's just so sad when you feel you cannot do it ... It was in sense of opportunity to have something so interesting to happen to you ... You have to approach something like this positively and throw yourself into it ... It's not fighting back, you can't fight it. But I wanted to understand what was happening to me in the only way I can.

— William Utermohlen, 2001 interview with Margaret Driscoll

His series of self-portraits became increasingly abstract as his dementia progressed, which according to the critic Anjan Chatterjee, describe "haunting psychological self-expressions". The early stages of the disease had not impacted his ability to paint, regardless of what was observed by Crutch et al. His cognitive disorder is not believed to have been hereditary; aside from a 1989 car accident which left him unconscious for around 30 minutes, Utermohlen's medical history was described by Crutch as "unremarkable". Redmond covered the mirrors in their house because Utermohlen was afraid of what he saw there, and had stopped using them for self-portraits. After Utermohlen's diagnosis, descriptions of his skull became a key aspect of his self-portraits, and the academic Robert Cook–Deegan noticed how as Utermohlen's condition progressed, he "gradually integrates less color".

Crutch et al speculate that the change in his painting style may have been caused by "deterioration in [his] ability to process perceptual and spatial information", which Tobi Zausner states didn't impact Utermohlen's memory massively in the early stages of the disease. Dr. Bruce Miller says that this might have made Utermohlen's earlier self-portraits more abstract and surreal, citing the cause of this to be the right parietal lobe, which they call "the dominant hemisphere for artistry". Redmond acknowledges that the visual distortions in the portraits were intentional, stating that the enlarged ears may represent his hearing problems. She also noted an emphasis in his forehead that is present within the self-portraits. Xi Hsu states that the vibrant pop art like colors and "traditional draughtsmanship" of Utermohlen's earlier works were "spared [from] the effects of dementia"; they are also present in the self-portraits. According to Giovanni Frazzetto of Science, the portraits are marked with "an agonizing awareness of impending physical and existential decay".

Self Portrait (In The Studio), 1996

The late self-portraits incorporate thicker brushwork than his earlier works. Writing for the Queen's Quarterly, the journalist Leslie Millin noted that his works became progressively more distorted but less colorful. In Nicci Gerrard's 2019 book, What Dementia Teaches Us About Love, she describes the self-portraits as emotional modernism.

In the 1996 Self Portrait (With Easel), (Note: Also named Self Portrait I or Self Portrait (With Easel–Yellow and Green)) which Zausner identifies as his first self portrait post-diagnosis, Utermohlen is realistically painted, except for the face, which is painted yellow. (With Easel) shows more confused emotions according to Green et al. Polini describes the appearance of the easel in (With Easel) as akin to prison bars. In Self Portrait (In The Studio) (1996), frustration and fear are evident in his expressions. Hsu speculates that Utermohlen created this self portrait to express that he did not want to be known for his struggles with dementia, and wanted to be known as an artist. A 1996 drawing, Broken Figure contains a ghost-like figure which serves as the outline of the fallen body in the drawing. His Self Portrait with Saw (1997) has a serrated carpenter's saw in the far right, which Redmond said invokes an autopsy that would have given a definite diagnosis. Polini noticed how the saw is vertically pointed, similar to a guillotine blade, and wrote that it may symbolize the "approach of a prefigured death". The guillotine theme is also highlighted by Polini in the 1998 Self Portrait (With Easel), comparing the red and yellow lines in the portrait to the shape of a guillotine. The last self portrait that Utermohlen used a mirror for, Self Portrait (With Easel) (1998) uses the same pose as a 1955 self-portrait. Polini states that this was his desire to "experience again the old motions of painting".

Erased Self Portrait (1999) (Note: Joann Loviglio also lists the date of creation as between 1999–2000.) was his last self-portrait using a paint brush. It took nearly two years to complete and was described by the BBC as "almost sponge like and empty". Polini describes the Erased Self Portrait as "drawn and erased at the same time". Head I (Note: Also titled just Head, or Self-portrait) (2000) shows a head portraying eyes, mouth, and a smudge on the left that appears to be an ear; a crack appears in the center of the head. The final portraits after Head I are of a blank head, one of them erased. Associated Press's Joann Loviglio describes Utermohlen's late self-portraits as the "afterimages of a creative and talented spirit whose identity appears to have vanished".

=== Influences ===
Francis Bacon's 1953 Study after Velázquez's Portrait of Pope Innocent X

Rob Sharp from Artsy states that the self-portraits are "expressionistic, and influenced by his German heritage". Redmond also links the portraits to German Expressionism, comparing them to artists such as Ernst Ludwig Kirchner and Emil Nolde, explaining for New Statesman: "It's odd, because he hardly ever thought of his German ancestry, but toward the end he becomes a kind of German abstract expressionist. He might have been quite amused by that, I think." Crutch et al from The Lancet noted how divisions of the face near the jawline in Utermohlen's self-portraits were similar to Picasso's works such as The Weeping Woman.

Shortly after his diagnosis, he and Redmond traveled to Europe and saw Diego Velázquez's 1650 Portrait of Pope Innocent X, which led to an interest in Francis Bacon's distorted 1953 version Study after Velázquez's Portrait of Pope Innocent X. After his return to England in 1996, he painted Self Portrait (In the Studio), which includes the screaming mouth motif from Bacon's Pope series.

A 2015 Scientific American article which mentions both Bacon and Utermohlen's works, describes Bacon's "distorted faces and disfigured bodies" as disturbing, notes that Bacon's works are "so distorted that they violate the brain's expectations for the body", and discusses the possibility that he had dysmorphopsia. The writer continues that Utermohlen's portraits offer "a window into the artist's" decline...[and are] "also heartbreaking in that they expose[d] a mind trying against hope to understand itself despite deterioration".

== Legacy ==
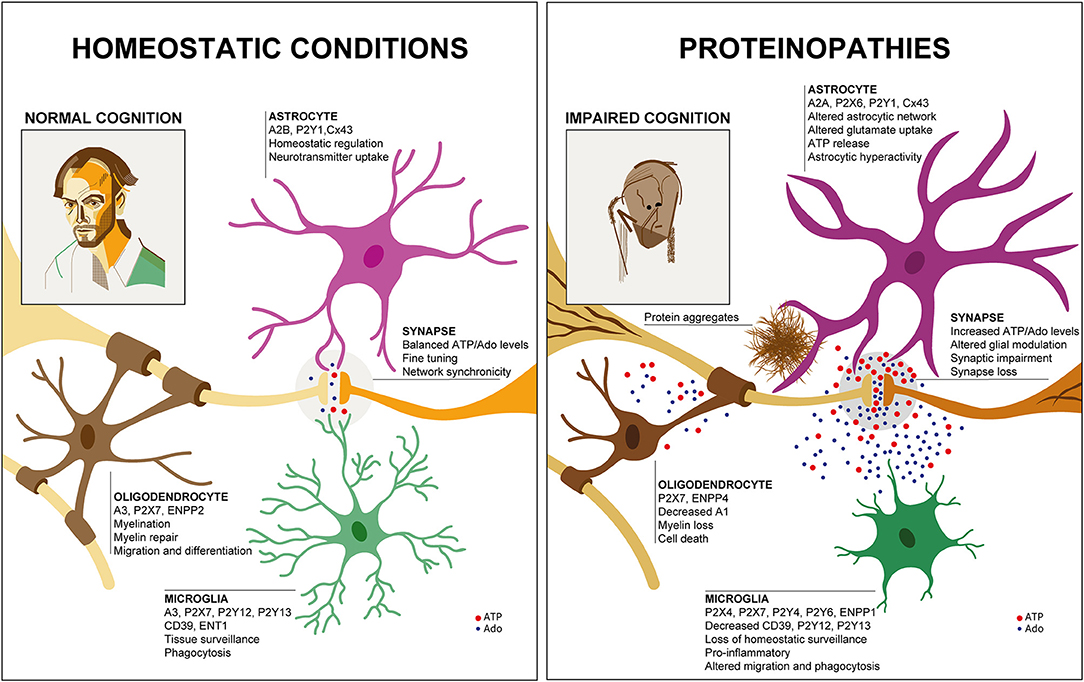
This synapse diagram contains recreations of the 1967 self-portrait and Head I.

Utermohlen's self-portraits were first reported on as the subject of the June 2001 case report published by The Lancet, and three months later in August an exhibition featuring the works at the Two 10 Gallery in London, and another exhibition in Paris, brought media attention to his self-portraits in the artistic and scientific world. In the case report, the Crutch et al noted that the evident change in artistic ability was "indicative of a process above and beyond normal aging". Further noted in the article was that Utermohlen showed "objective deterioration in the quality of the artwork produced". They concluded that the portraits offered "a testament to the resilience of human creativity", saying that his willingness to work with The Lancet made his self-portraits "free from the diagnostic uncertainty which has made assessment of de Kooning's work so controversial". Crutch said that Utermohlen's works were "more eloquent than anything he could have said with words". Utermohlen wanted his works to be a subject of medical research, willingly engaging in research published by The Lancet, which involved the relationship between the symptoms of the disease and the aesthetics of his work. Commenting about the case report to The Daily Telegraph, he said: "I think it is perfect. It is there to help people."

The self-portraits have become one of the most widely recognized depictions of the cognitive decline from Alzheimer's in art. According to Hsu, the portraits are the "highlight of his career". Sharma compared the self-portraits to the works of English painter Ivan Seal, noting that the latter's works show objects that "[teeter] on the brink of pure recognition and abstraction". Writers at the Neuropsychology journal have likened the self-portraits to the illustrations of Mervyn Peake; although Demetrios J. Sahlas of Peake Studies noted that Peake's works differ from Utermohlen's, because of the "preservation of insight". A 2013 article in The Lancet compared his work to self-portraits by Rembrandt, and described Utermohlen as "struggling to preserve his self against age" while also fighting against "inexorable neurodegeneration". Frazzetto described Utermohlen's self-portraits as similar to the works of Egon Schiele, explaining that the portraits were "evocative of the shrivelled bodies and diaphanous faces" shown in the latter's work. Mike Shahin from Times Colonist deemed the self-portraits as "one of the most powerful artistic commentaries on the ravages of Alzheimer's... promis[ing] to speak to people about Alzheimer's for years to come". Dr. Miller called Utermohlen's self-portraits proof that "people [can] express what they can despite their disease".

Sherri Irvin says that the portraits show "remarkable stylistic features, [rewarding] serious efforts of appreciation and interpretation". Irvin notes that their "formal and aesthetic features", the correlation with Utermohlen's earlier works and their "aptness to interpretation", is what makes the portraits "jointly sufficient to connect them in the right way with past art, [regardless of] the absence of an express[ed] intention about how they are to be regarded".

Alan E. H. Emery believes that the progressive effects of dementia give neurologists "an opportunity to study how the disease affects an artist's work over time", and provide a unique method of studying detailed change in perception, and how it can be linked to localized brain functions, concluding by stating that documenting changes over time with neuroimaging could lead to better understanding of dementia. Medical anthropologist Margaret Lock states that the portraits indicate that "there may be many avenues [...] that suggest ways in which humans can be protected from the ravages of this condition by means of lifelong social and cultural activities". Dr. Jeffery L. Cummings said that study of Utermohlen's self-portraits and other Alzheimer's patients could help with understanding how the brain works, which could aid in the earlier diagnosis of Alzheimer's and other forms of dementia. He added that they "[brought] the interphase of science and art to a whole new level".

Andrew Purcell stated that Utermohlen's artwork provided viewers with a "unique glimpse into the effects of a declining brain". Researchers at Illinois Wesleyan University stated that Utermohlen's self portraits show that "people with AD can have a strong voice through images". The existence of his earlier self-portraits (which allow viewers to create a time-lapse of his mental decline) and the idea that his works give a rare view into the mind of an Alzheimer's patient contributed to his growing popularity. The 2019 short film Mémorable was inspired by the self-portraits and nominated for the Academy Award for Best Animated Short Film in 2020.

== Exhibitions ==
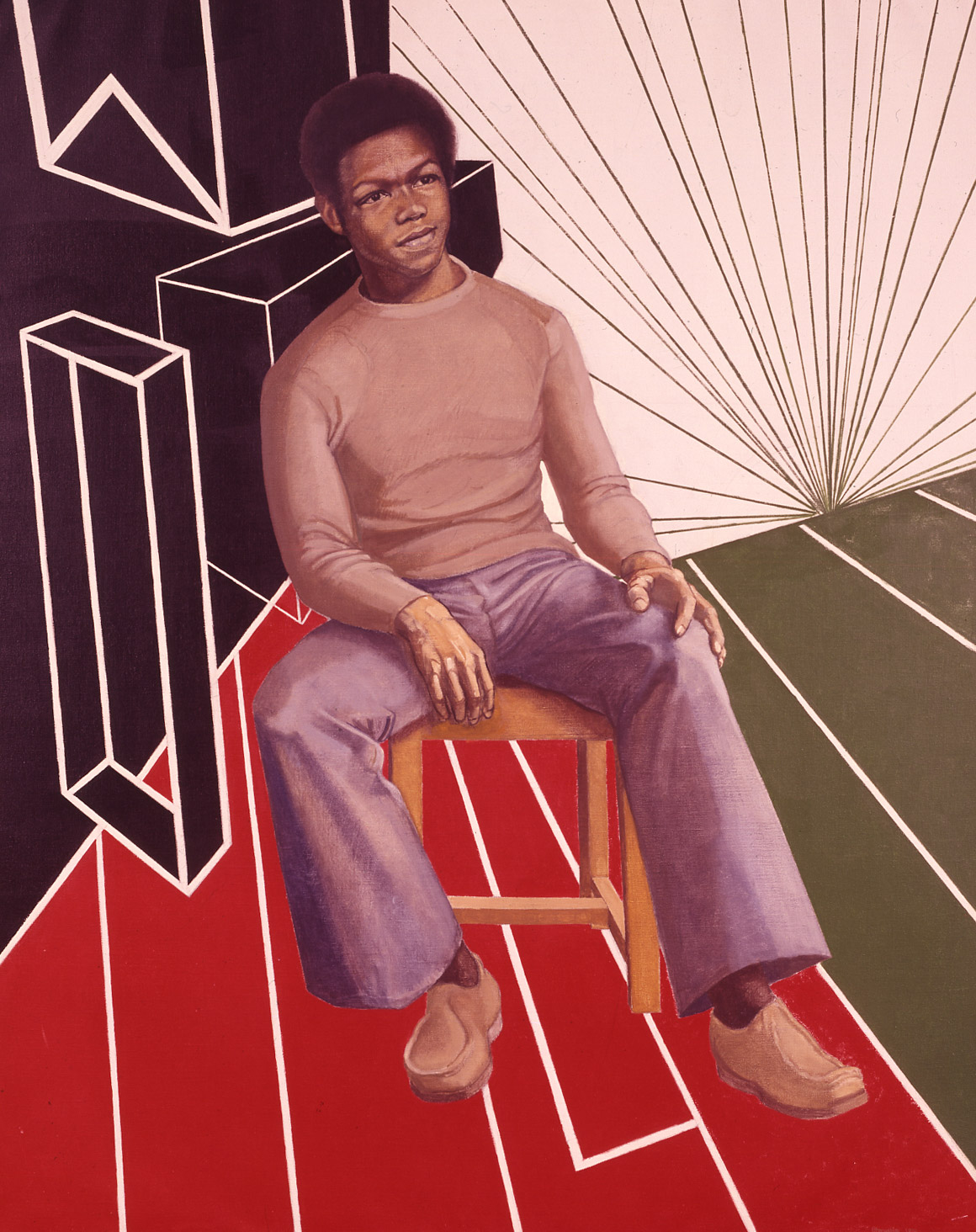
Utermohlen's posthumous portrait of Gerald Penny (1974)

Utermohlen had exhibited art long before his diagnosis. His paintings were exhibited at the Lee Nordness Gallery in 1968, the Marlborough Gallery in 1969, and in 1972, the Mummers cycle was displayed in Amsterdam. Utermohlen's posthumous portrait of Gerald Penny was featured in the Gerald Penny '77 Center; earlier that year, he had artworks such as Five Figures in the Mead Art Museum. Five Figures is another painting about Gerald Penny. At their peak, sales of Utermohlen's earlier works ranged from $3,000 to $30,000.

His self-portraits had several exhibitions in the years after his death, including 12 exhibitions from 2006 to 2008. In 2016, the exhibition A Persistence of Memory was shown at the Loyola University Museum of Art in Chicago. The exhibition, which held 100 of Utermohlen's works, was organized by Pamela Ambrose, who said about his portraits: "If you did not know that this man was suffering from Alzheimer's, you could simply perceive the work as a stylistic change." A 2016 exhibition at the Science Gallery Dublin titled Trauma: Built to Break featured some of his self-portraits. It was reviewed by Frazzetto, who wrote: "At a time when terrorism, forced migration, ideologies of hatred, and the risk of war put our civilization and mental well-being to test, a creative reflection on the science and experience of trauma is obliging."

Other exhibitions include a retrospective at the GV Art gallery in London in 2012, (Note: The GV Art gallery had another exhibition of Utermohlen's work earlier that year, under the name William Utermohlen: Artistic Decline Through Alzheimer's.) an exhibition at the Chicago Cultural Center in 2008 sponsored by Myriad Pharmaceuticals, and The Later Works of William Utermohlen, shown at the New York Academy of Medicine in 2006, which marked the centenary of Alois Alzheimer first discovering the disease; it was open free to the public. Earlier that year, another exhibition was at the College of Physicians of Philadelphia. His self-portraits have been shown in Washington, D.C. in 2007, the Two 10 Gallery in London in 2001, Harvard University at Cambridge, Massachusetts in 2005, Boston, and Los Angeles. The self-portraits were exhibited in Sacramento, California in 2008. Utermohlen's artworks were shown in 2016 at the Kunstmuseum Thun in Switzerland. In February 2007, one month before Utermohlen's death, his self-portraits were exhibited at Wilkes University.

== See also ==
- Everywhere at the End of Time (2016–2019), a series of six concept albums reflecting the stages of dementia
- It's Such a Beautiful Day (2012), an experimental film depicting the progressively failing memory and worsening symptoms of the protagonist due to a neurological disease
- Time's Arrow (2017), an episode of the series BoJack Horseman that portraits the impact of dementia visually, including by the alteration and erasing of faces.
