= Clickbait (disambiguation) =

Clickbait is web content intended to entice users to click on a link.

Clickbait may also refer to:

== Film and television ==
- Clickbait (film), 2018 film
- Clickbait (miniseries), 2021 television series

== Songs ==
- "Clickbait", 2016 song by Chelsea Grin, from the album Self Inflicted
- "Clickbait", 2019 song by Logic, from the album Confessions of a Dangerous Mind
- "Clickbait", 2021 song by Exodus, from the album Persona Non Grata
- "Clickbait", 2023 song by Dero Goi
- "Clickbait", 2024 song by Neonoen
- "C1 - Clickbait", 2017 song by Leyland Kirby, from the album We, So Tired of All the Darkness in Our Lives
