= Mémorable =

- Directed by: Bruno Collet
- Written by: Bruno Collet
- Produced by: Jean-Francois Le Corre
- Starring: Dominique Reymond; André Wilms
- Cinematography: Fabien Drouet
- Edited by: Jean-Marie Le Rest
- Music by: Nicolas Martin
- Distributed by: Vivement Lundi
- Release date: 11 June 2019
- Running time: 12 minutes
- Country: France
- Language: French

Mémorable is a 2019 French short animated film written and directed by Bruno Collet. The stop-motion film deals with Alzheimer's disease, and was nominated for an Academy Award.

== Plot ==
The film concerns the relationship between Louis, a painter suffering from Alzheimer's, and his wife Michelle. At first, Louis seems merely forgetful, but as the film progresses his dementia becomes apparent. The viewer experiences much of this from Louis' point of view; objects melt and shape shift in his hand. When Louis encounters other characters, such as the doctor Michelle takes him to, they appear strange and monstrous. Aware of his condition, Louis tapes notes on household objects to remind himself of their usage, but this effort ends with him sitting in a sea of detached notes. Michelle notices the effect Louis' condition has on his increasingly abstract paintings.

At the end of the film, Louis no longer recognizes Michelle, who appears to him now as a translucent figure made of scattered paint strokes. Still, Louis is stunned by Michelle's beauty. They dance together until Michelle dissolves into a swirl of floating dots.

== Background ==
Bruno Collet was inspired to create the film when he saw the paintings of William Utermohlen, an American painter who kept working throughout his Alzheimer's disease diagnosis. The film is primarily made with stop-motion animation, but computer-generated 3D effects are also utilized.

== Accolades ==
The film premiered at the Annecy International Animated Film Festival where it won the Cristal for a Short Film, the Audience Award, and the Junior Jury Award for a Short Film. It was also nominated for the Academy Award for Best Animated Short Film.
