= Patience (After Sebald) (soundtrack) =

Album by the Caretaker

Soundtrack album by the Caretaker
- Released: 23 January 2012
- Genres: Ambient; drone; classical; plunderphonics
- Length: 48:56
- Label: History Always Favours The Winners
- Producer: Leyland Kirby

The Caretaker chronology
| An Empty Bliss Beyond This World (2011) | Patience (After Sebald) (2012) | Extra Patience (After Sebald) (2012) |

Extra Patience (After Sebald)

Soundtrack album by the Caretaker
- Released: 15 February 2012
- Genres: Ambient; drone; classical; plunderphonics
- Length: 24:11
- Label: History Always Favours the Winners
- Producer: Leyland Kirby

The Caretaker chronology
| Patience (After Sebald) (2012) | Extra Patience (After Sebald) (2012) | Everywhere at the End of Time - Stage 1 (2016) |

The soundtrack for Patience (After Sebald) (2012), a film by Grant Gee, was composed and produced by English musician James Leyland Kirby under his ambient music project The Caretaker. The official soundtrack album was issued on 23 January 2012. Unlike other albums of the Caretaker that used old recordings of playful and bright ballroom music, Kirby's score for the film uses a 1927 recording of Franz Schubert's song cycle for voice and piano Winterreise (1828) as its main audio source. It also differs from other works of the project where hissing sounds are used instead of crackles, the loops are shorter in lengths, and the non-musical aspects of each track (the hiss sounds) serve as the foreground of the mix. The soundtrack was favorably received by professional music journalists.

== History ==
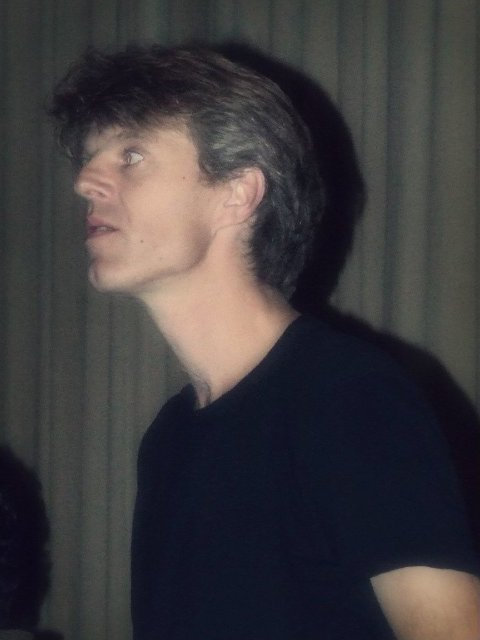
Patience (After Sebald) filmmaker Grant Gee asked James Kirby to make music for the film in 2009 and provided him a 1927 record of Winterreise (1828) by Franz Schubert for producing the soundtrack.

Grant Gee asked James Kirby to soundtrack his film Patience (After Sebald) in 2009. Gee explained in an interview that when he figured out what film stock he would be using to record footage, he "knew [he] wanted to use James’ music" for the presence of "scratches and degradation and repetition" from old records. Kirby created the soundtrack before he started work on An Empty Bliss Beyond This World (2011). The official album for the soundtrack of Patience (After Sebald) was first issued on vinyl on 23 January 2012 and then in digital stores on 14 February 2012.

On the official album release for Patience (After Sebald)'s soundtrack, there are more pianos heard than there are voices. “No one knows what shadowy memories haunt them to this day” is the first track on the album where vocals become a dominant sound. On 15 February 2012, the album Extra Patience (After Sebald) was released for free; it is a set of alternate versions of tracks from the soundtrack's main album release as well as music that is not included on the album release but is heard in the actual film. It is where more of the focus is on the vocal aspects of the 78-rpm recording and was compared by James Knapman of Igloo magazine to Akira Rabelais' album Spellewauerynsherde (2004).

== Composition and sound ==
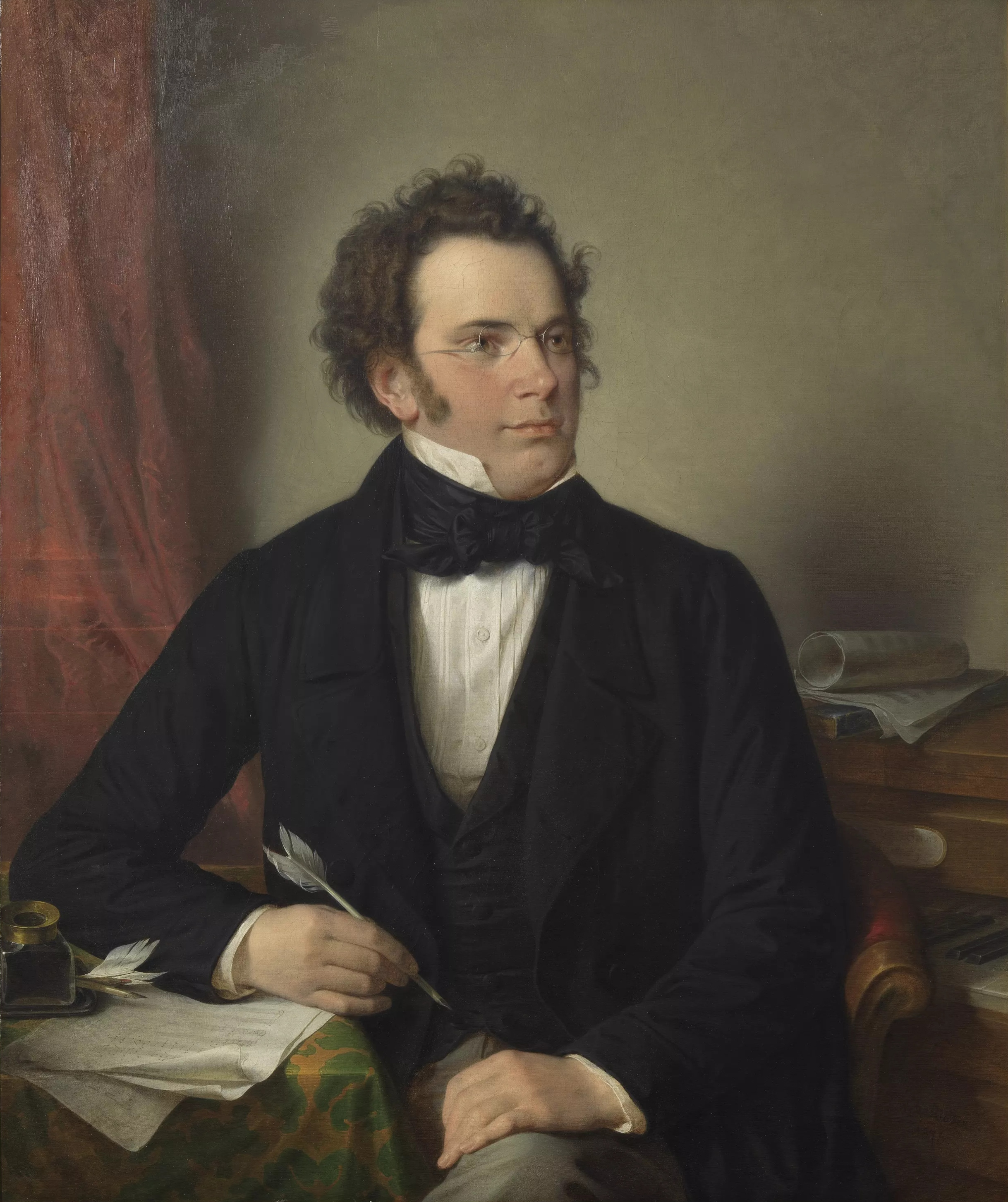
The main audio source used for the soundtrack of Patience (After Sebald) is a 1927 recording of Winterreise (1828) by composer Franz Schubert.

The soundtrack is a set of classical ambient piano-based music categorized by Jordan Cronk of Coke Machine Glow as "one of the warmest, most tangible examples of modern drone music." Unlike past works of the Caretaker where the audio snippets used were from bright, playful ballroom records, the main audio source of the soundtrack is a degraded 1927 78-rpm recording of a rendition of Winterreise (1828), a piece by Austrian composer Franz Schubert. The record was bought by Gee and given to Kirby for making the film's music.

Labeled by critic Andrew Ryce as "one of Kirby's most consistent and stylistically severe" works, the soundtrack only consists of pianos and vocals. As the official press release for the film describes, the soundtrack uses parts of the 78-rpm recording and turns them into a "dust-caked haze of plangent keys, strangely resolved loops and de-pitched vocals which recede from view as eerily as they appear." The samples are repeated, stretched, and detuned to the point where, in the words of AllMusic journalist Heather Phares, "they're nothing but ghostly shadows of themselves" and "literal rings of melancholia." The snippets are altered in ways that results in pianos sounding like organs or synthesizers and, in the words of Knapman, voice parts that turn into "almost operatic arias."

Knapman noted that the loops on the soundtrack are shorter in length than what would usually be heard on other releases of the Caretaker. "Increasingly absorbed in his own World” uses a repeated sample that is the longest in length out of snippets from all the tracks. Jonny Mugwump, a critic for Fact magazine, wrote that the music doesn't have "narrative development" and instead uses "world-weary atmospherics and heavy repetition and loops," a structure identical to the Caretaker's album Persistent Repetition of Phrases (2008). The score also differs from previous Caretaker works in that hissing sounds are used instead of vinyl crackles and the non-musical elements of the music serve as the main focus (the hiss sounds). As Rory Gibb of The Quietus analyzed, the pianos are "half-vanished" by the sounds of static noises and dark mist, while Ben Beaumont-Thomas of The Guardian wrote that the pianos "lollop along, drenched in static, while detuned voices burble from the murk."

Each piece of Patience (After Sebald)'s score has audio samples and static sounds with different timbres and moods as well as varied amounts of processing, and the soundtrack balances between both calm pieces such as "Increasingly absorbed in his own World" and sinister cuts such as "No one knows what shadowy memories haunt them to this day" in a chiaroscuro-like technique. The most processing takes place on the second half of the original album release, where, in the words of Mark Richardson of Pitchfork, "transformation becomes the prevailing theme." Throughout the soundtrack, the tone of the hiss textures range from calm to harsh to the point where it "separat[es] the listener from the melody" on "Approaching the outer limits of our solar system," Phares analyzed. Certain samples are used in more than one track but significantly change in terms of how they are processed or change in speed. For instance, “I have become almost invisible, to some extent like a dead man" consists of a piano sample with only very little static sounds in the background. The same snippet is used in “In the deep and dark hours of the night" but with the sample being slowed down and the static being much more present in the mix.

The soundtrack also varies in the way samples are edited. On "As if one were sinking into sand," the piano loop cuts out and starts over when it perform a melody that starts to "trail up hesitantly," which "expresses Sisyphean frustration" in the words of Phares. She wrote that the track "When the dog days were drawing to an end" involves a loop where a piano "anticipates a murky vocal," but the loop repeats before the vocal line can finished, thus "leaving listeners craving a resolution that never comes." On "The homesickness that was corroding her soul," there is brief silence before the melody beings in each repetition of the loop, which, as Phares described, "seems to punctuate each loop with a pensive sigh." The pitch of the sample also changes randomly, thus giving the track a feel of unease. “No one knows what shadowy memories haunt them to this day” and the album closer "Now the night is over and the dawn is about to break" are tracks that stretch out single syllables from male vocal snippets and turns them into what Richardson described as "tense, uneasy drones."

== Concepts ==
Richardson analyzed Schubert's works as representing "frozen world[s]" and wrote that "Kirby responds in kind, crafting [a film soundtrack] that hints at the season's chill with characteristic complexity and ambiguity." In the music for Patience (After Sebald), there is more tension in what Will Ryan of Beats per Minute described as the "space between the origins of Kirby’s source material and the place – nearly three-quarters of a century later – we’re now hearing it." The record used for making the score is in the public domain, which Mugwump suggested was a commentary of the problems of media ownership during a period of illegal downloading. Kirby himself described the soundtrack as "a lot more of a winter album, a lot darker," while Gee explained that the music executes a "gritty, dusty, destroyed universe," which represents "Sebald's images of dust falling, particles and granularity." Cronk theorized that the music regards Kirby's fear of how civilization will work in the future, as it is "grounded in a more contemporary milieu than [other works of the project] even as it continually portends the demise of an unidentified civilization." Richardson wrote that the soundtrack's voice parts "reinforce the feeling of collapsing into something, the howls, that could stand in for pain or ecstasy, suggest that something will never be the same."

== Critical reception ==
Professional ratings
Aggregate scores
| Source | Rating |
|---|---|
| Metacritic | 81/100 |
Review scores
| Source | Rating |
| AllMusic | 4/5 stars |
| Beats Per Minute | 72% |
| Cokemachineglow | 80% |
| Fact | 4/5 stars |
| Mojo | 4/5 stars |
| Pitchfork | 8.0/10 |
| Resident Advisor | 4/5 |
| Tiny Mix Tapes | 4/5 stars |
| Uncut | 8/10 |

Patience (After Sebald) was met with critical acclaim. The score for Patience (After Sebald) was awarded by magazine Chart Attack as one of the top ten "Great Soundtracks by Independent Artists," where the magazine labeled it as "probably the closest you’ll ever get to hearing what dementia sounds like without actually losing your mind." Self-titled magazine called the music "a magical instance of mood manipulation," which was impressive given the type of sounds Kirby worked with that would've otherwise resulted in a "monotonous listen." Describing the music as "conceptually and emotionally satisfying," Phares opined that the score "succeeds as beautifully evocative music to accompany the documentary, as another distinctive entry in Kirby's Caretaker discography and as an inspired blending of different works that makes its own statement."

Cronk highlighted how the music "breathe[d]" the signature style of the Caretaker in a different manner, writing that "the drones he constructs to buttress each piece accentuat[es] the simultaneously lulling and foreboding samples without suffocating the natural ambiance either ingredient naturally imparts." Similarly, Knapman praised Kirby's work for Patience (After Sebald) as another example of retaining the Caretaker's style but having different methods doing so. He opined that the short lengths of most of the soundtrack's sample loops led it to be sometimes "actively grating" without watching the film, but the music "peak[ed] more than it dip[ped]" due to the variety of ways that the snippets are manipulated. He also wrote that Extra Patience (After Sebald) was better than the official album release of the soundtrack due to its shorter track lengths. Ryan opined that while most of the soundtrack was "truly great," it was also a "little slight" in a few parts where it "sidle[d] around like lost Alzheimer’s patients [...] without really capturing the inherent tragedy there" due to the loops feeling "plodding," "stilted," and not "interesting."

== Track listing ==
Patience (After Sebald)
| No. | Title | Length |
|---|---|---|
| 1. | "Everything is on the point of decline" | 2:33 |
| 2. | "As if one were sinking into sand" | 2:30 |
| 3. | "Approaching the outer limits of our solar system" | 5:40 |
| 4. | "When the dog days were drawing to an end" | 4:50 |
| 5. | "A last glimpse of the land being lost forever" | 2:55 |
| 6. | "The homesickness that was corroding her soul" | 3:36 |
| 7. | "I have become almost invisible, to some extent like a dead man" | 4:00 |
| 8. | "In the deep and dark hours of the night" | 4:38 |
| 9. | "No one knows what shadowy memories haunt them to this day" | 4:04 |
| 10. | "Increasingly absorbed in his own World" | 4:24 |
| 11. | "Isolated lights on the abyss of ignorance" | 4:32 |
| 12. | "Now the night is over and the dawn is about to break" | 5:14 |
| Total length: | | 48:56 |

Extra Patience (After Sebald)
| No. | Title | Length |
|---|---|---|
| 1. | "Everything is on the point of decline (again)" | 1:13 |
| 2. | "So run down" | 2:12 |
| 3. | "Isolated lights (again)" | 2:02 |
| 4. | "Of grace and providence" | 2:26 |
| 5. | "A golden pheasant on a black ground" | 2:16 |
| 6. | "The Quilter Standard" | 1:24 |
| 7. | "After the Earth has ground itself down" | 4:38 |
| 8. | "But the Stars had come out" | 3:00 |
| 9. | "Sebald" | 5:00 |
| Total length: | | 24:11 |

== Personnel ==
Derived from the liner notes of Patience (After Sebald).

- Recorded by James Kirby
- Artwork by Ivan Seal
- Mastered by Lupo (Andreas Lubich)

== Release history ==
| Region | Date | Format(s) | Label |
|---|---|---|---|
| Worldwide | 23 January 2012 | Vinyl | History Always Favours The Winners |
| Worldwide | 14 February 2012 | Digital download | History Always Favours The Winners |
