= Everywhere at the End of Time =

2016–2019 album series by the Caretaker

- Ivan Seal, Beaten Frowns After, 2016, oil on canvas, cover art for Stage 1

Studio album series by the Caretaker
- Released: 22 September 2016 (Stage 1); 6 April 2017 (Stage 2); 28 September 2017 (Stage 3); 5 April 2018 (Stage 4); 20 September 2018 (Stage 5); 14 March 2019 (Stage 6)
- Studios: James Leyland Kirby's flat in Kraków, Poland
- Genres: Ambient; avant-garde; big band; dark ambient; drone; electronic; experimental; hauntology; noise; plunderphonics; sound collage
- Length: 390:31 (6:30:31)
- Label: History Always Favours the Winners
- Producer: James Leyland Kirby

The Caretaker chronology
Extra Patience (After Sebald) (2012)	Everywhere at the End of Time (2016–2019)	Everywhere, an Empty Bliss (2019)

Everywhere at the End of Time (Note: Stylised in sentence case.) is a series of albums by English electronic musician James Leyland Kirby under the alias the Caretaker. Released between 2016 and 2019, its six albums use degraded samples of old ballroom music, largely from the 1920s and 1930s, to portray the stages of Alzheimer's disease. Inspired by the success of An Empty Bliss Beyond This World (2011), Kirby produced the project in Kraków out of his fascination with the topic, and made it his final release under the alias. He released each record after a six-month period for listeners to feel the passage of time, and used abstract art pieces by his friend Ivan Seal as album covers. The series drew comparisons to the works of musicians William Basinski and Burial, while production of the later albums was influenced by the aleatoric music of avant-gardist composer John Cage.

Everywhere comprises over six hours and 30 minutes of music and portrays a range of events in a patient's life, including joy, despair, confusion, nostalgia, anxiety, horror, isolation, and death. The album mostly samples big band music throughout. Stages 1–3 are the most similar to An Empty Bliss, while Stages 4–6 depart from the Caretaker's older melodic ambient works to form chaotic noise soundscapes. Anonymous visual artist Weirdcore created music videos for the first two stages, which accompanied Kirby's performances. Initially concerned about the project being seen as pretentious, Kirby thought of not creating the album at all, although he spent more time producing it than any of his other releases. Seal's paintings were covered by a French art exhibition named after the Caretaker's Everywhere, an Empty Bliss (2019), a compilation album of scrapped tracks.

As each stage of Everywhere was released, critics felt increasingly positive towards the series, highlighting its length, unusual concept and perceived emotional power. Considered to be Kirby's magnum opus, the project was one of the most praised music releases of the 2010s. During the early 2020s, it became a YouTube and TikTok phenomenon in the form of a listening challenge and recommendation, after which caregivers of people with dementia praised the albums for increasing empathy among younger listeners. The series has since retained status either as a "dark" project or as a meme in Internet culture, inspiring several similar projects by the Caretaker fanbase and influencing other forms of media such as video games. It emerged in aesthetic styles such as the analog horror genre, liminal spaces and the Backrooms, including its 2026 film.

== Background ==
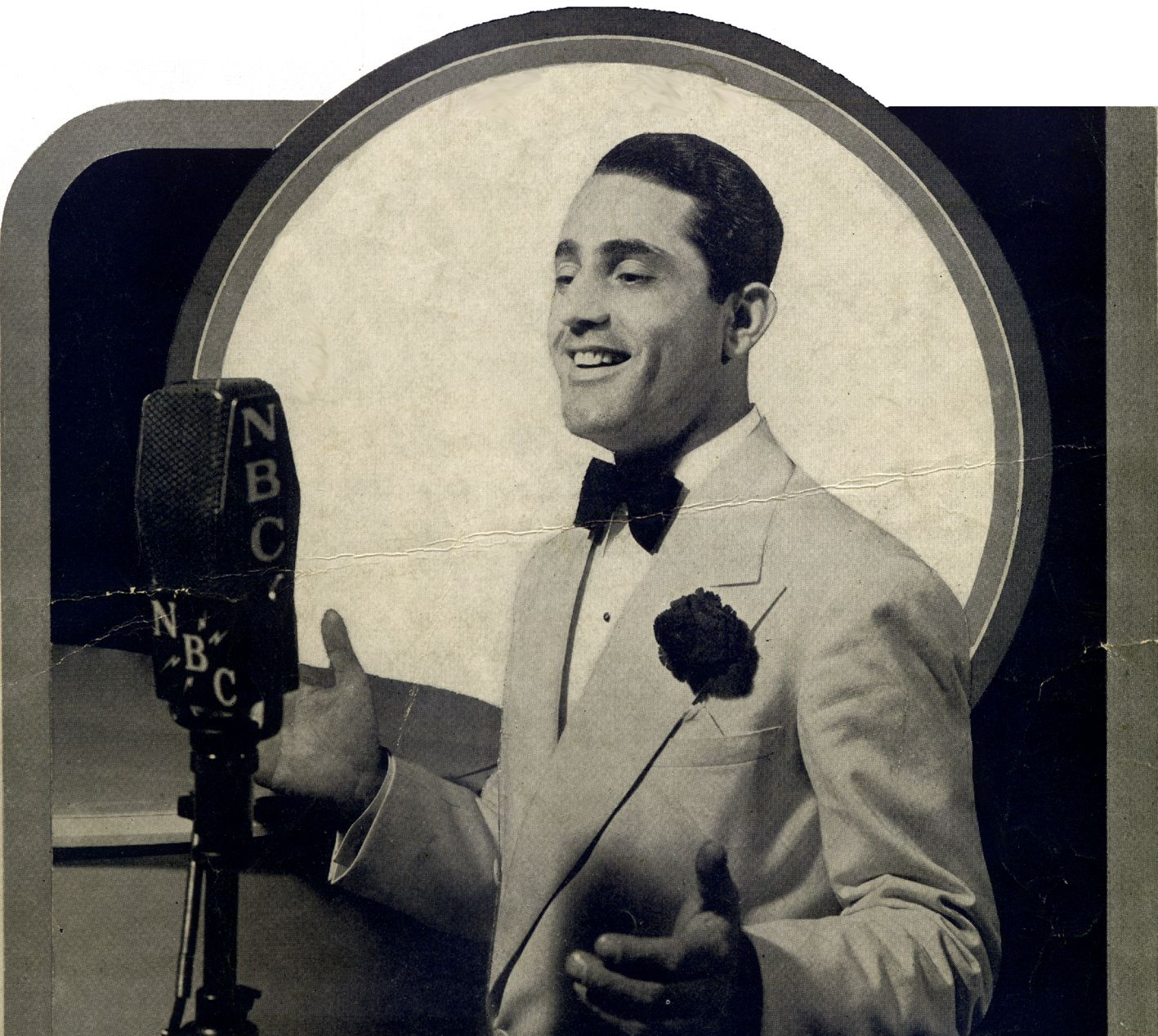
Al Bowlly, a big band artist sampled in Everywhere at the End of Time

In 1999, English electronic musician James Leyland Kirby adopted the pseudonym the Caretaker, under which he released several albums sampling big band records to convey a ghostly ambience. He was inspired by a scene of the haunted ballroom from filmmaker Stanley Kubrick's work The Shining (1980), as heard on the debut release of the alias, Selected Memories from the Haunted Ballroom (1999). These first records introduced the ambient style that would become more prominent in his last releases. The project first explored memory in general with Theoretically Pure Anterograde Amnesia (2005), a three-hour-long album portraying the disease of the same name. By 2008, Persistent Repetition of Phrases saw the Caretaker alias gaining a wider critical attention and a larger fanbase.

In 2011, Kirby released An Empty Bliss Beyond This World, attaining acclaim for its exploration of Alzheimer's disease. Although Kirby initially did not want to produce more music as the Caretaker, the album's success compelled him to continue the project. Patience (After Sebald) (2012), his next release, was a soundtrack album which did not feature themes of memory loss nor the same musical style of his other releases. For him, the only concept related to memory left to explore was the full progression of Alzheimer's, which he envisioned would gradually unravel through the six albums of Everywhere at the End of Time. The project is his final release as the Caretaker and also represents the symbolical death of the alias, as according to Kirby, "I just can't see where I can take it after this."

== Music and concept ==
For to be capable of remembering this music as a real-time, living culture, you'd have to be in your nineties now. What Kirby presents here could be heard as the faint, faded memory-fragments of once-beloved tunes as they waver on in atrophying minds.

— Simon Reynolds

The concept of Everywhere at the End of Time, which has been described as avant-gardist, experimental and plunderphonic in nature, explores dementia's "advancement and totality". Although Alzheimer's has seven stages, the first stage presents no symptoms and is not portrayed in the series, as it would merely present the sourced samples, which Kirby called "Stage 0". The six albums feature expressive track titles and descriptions by Kirby for each stage, which highlight the ideas of deterioration, melancholy, confusion, and mortality that are present throughout. On the work's characterisation of mortality, writer Alexandra Weiss described the series as challenging to Western notions of death. Its portrayal of confusion, according to music website Tiny Mix Tapes, "threatens at every moment to give way to nothing" and renders it the definitive swan song of the Caretaker alias. Big Think's Tim Brinkhof categorised the project as a piece of high culture and called its deterioration "terrifying", due to its manipulation of Roaring Twenties and Jazz Age samples into incoherent white noise, while French researchers Christine Esclapez and Luis Velasco-Plufeau highlighted how the sampling "takes place in time even as the music itself depicts the passage of time".

Everywhere's exploration of decay drew comparisons to The Disintegration Loops (2002–2003) by musician William Basinski, which, unlike Kirby's software-induced decay representative of a neurological disease, focuses on physical tape decay in coincidence with the September 11 attacks. Although complimentary of Basinski's works, Kirby said his own "aren't just loops breaking down. They're about why they're breaking down, and how." Author Matt Colquhoun of The Quietus compared the sound of the series to the style of electronic musician Burial, as both artists "highlight the 'broken time of the twenty-first century'", while Daniel Bromfield of 48 Hills likened the project's aesthetic qualities to the fictional VHS tapes found throughout the plot of Canadian film Skinamarink (2022). While reviewing the first stage, writers Adrian Mark Lore and Andrea Savage recommended the record for enjoyers of Basinski, Stars of the Lid, and Brian Eno. Music magazine Fact noted a "hauntological link" between the ballroom records sampled in each stage and the Muzak songs modified in vaporwave albums, which is present in a more explicit manner than in other electronic acts such as Boards of Canada. The project also drew comparisons to the works of French musician Éliane Radigue and of American sound artist Alvin Lucier, specifically his tape I Am Sitting in a Room (1969). The digital aura of the series, illustrated by the complete edition's six-hour runtime and minimalist thumbnail on YouTube, was also highlighted for "challeng[ing] how listeners engage with the music itself", according to MSN's Polyphonic.

The songs of Everywhere, which span over six and a half hours, get more distorted with each stage to reflect the patient's memory and its deterioration, and were described by writer Frank Falisi as "fundamentally sentimental cultural object[s]". The jazz style of the first three stages is reminiscent of An Empty Bliss, using loops from vinyl records and wax cylinders. Besides representing the progression of Alzheimer's, the repetition of these stages, according to researchers from the Università per Stranieri di Siena, also plays the role of metaphorising how unrecognisable the surrounding world seems to the Caretaker. On Stage 3, the songs are shorter—some lasting for only one minute—and typically avoid fade-outs. The Post-Awareness stages reflect Kirby's desire to "explore complete confusion, where everything starts breaking down". The two penultimate stages represent the patient's altered perception of reality through more chaotic soundscapes, while the final stage portrays the emptiness of the afflicted person's mind through drones. Stages 4–6 are often highlighted as the focus of the series: Miles Bowe of Pitchfork wrote about the contrast of the later stages to Kirby's other ambient works as "evolving its sound in new and often frightening ways", while Kirby described the series to be "more about the last three [stages] than the first three". In their Handbook of the Anthropology of Sound, Bloomsbury Academic describes the later stages as "a disorienting cut-up of slurred reminiscences bathing in a reverberant fog", relating them to amusia and its effects on musical memory.

== Stages ==
=== Stages 1–3 ===
Everywhere at the End of Time – Stages 1–3
- Beaten Frowns After, 2016; Pittor Pickgown in Khatheinstersper, 2015; Hag, 2014

Studio album series by the Caretaker
- Genres: Big band; hauntology; jazz
- Length: 41:20 (Stage 1); 41:50 (Stage 2); 45:29 (Stage 3)

The Caretaker chronology
Extra Patience (After Sebald) (2012)	Everywhere at the End of Time – Stages 1–3 (2016–2017)	Take Care. It's a Desert Out There... (2017)

Audio sample
- Stage 1: A1 – "It's Just a Burning Memory": file; help

Stage 1 represents the initial signs of memory deterioration and is the closest album in the series to what Kirby calls a "a beautiful daydream". On its vinyl release, it features inscripted text reading "Memories That Last a Lifetime". Like An Empty Bliss, Stage 1's samples are looped and altered with pitch changes, reverberation, overtones, and vinyl crackle. The album features a mostly positive emotional tone, demonstrated by the notions its song titles evoke. Names such as "Into Each Other's Eyes" may be interpreted as a romantic memory, while more ominous titles, such as "We Don't Have Many Days", point to the patient's recognition of their own mortality. Despite being an upbeat release by the Caretaker, some of its big band compositions are more distorted and melancholic than others, such as "Slightly Bewildered". Michele Palozzo of Italian music publication Ondarock likened the record's "elegance" to Stanley Kubrick's Eyes Wide Shut (1999) and its dramatic "avidity" to the works of filmmaker Woody Allen. The album's joyful sound is contrasted by one of the sentences in its description, where Kirby clarifies these are "the last of the great days".

Stage 2, to Kirby, is the "self-realization that something is wrong and a refusal to accept that". In Kirby's description, a person in this stage usually makes more attempts to recall than normal. In contrast with the first stage's joyful sound, he noted the second stage as featuring "a massive difference between the moods". "A Losing Battle Is Raging" represents a transition between the two. Compared with Stage 1, the album features an emotionally charged tone, with more melancholic, degraded and droning samples. Its source material presents significantly more static than the first stage, exploring a hauntological ambience. Track titles, such as "Surrendering to Despair", represent the patient's awareness of their disorder and the accompanying sorrow, while "The Way Ahead Feels Lonely" is directly lifted from a book on dementia by Sally Magnusson. The songs play for longer times and feature fewer loops, but are more deteriorated in quality, to symbolise the person's realisation of their faulty memory. The album's description also states the "mood is generally lower", but still not to a level where "confusion starts setting in".

Stage 3 presents, in Kirby's description, "some of the last coherent memories before confusion fully rolls in and the grey mists form and fade away". A portion of the tracks are samples from An Empty Bliss, some returning with an underwater-like sound and ending abruptly, to portray the patient's growing despair and struggle to keep their memories. Kirby highlighted the returnal of previously used samples from the alias as "older memories coming back in various disfigured ways", calling it "a huge detail often missed by critics and writers". Tracks' titles combine names from the previous stages and from An Empty Bliss, and result in abstract phrases such as "Sublime Beyond Loss" and "Internal Bewildered World". Three of these are named after American neuroscientist Benjamin Libet: "Back There Benjamin", "Libet's All Joyful Camaraderie", and "Libet Delay". Online magazine Entropy described Stage 3's deterioration as the most distant from Basinski's method of decay and noted the record's "more direct, less intellectualized approach" to it when compared to the works of German musician Stephan Mathieu. The latter half of the album presents the last recognisable melodies, although some tracks nearly lose their melodic qualities. Kirby explained these are the last moments that the patient knows of their dementia, and that they represent "the last embers of awareness before we enter the post awareness stages".

The opening track of Stage 1, "It's Just a Burning Memory", introduces "Heartaches", one of the main samples that gradually degrade throughout the series. At first, it is a version by Al Bowlly, which is one of the most sampled musicians in the Caretaker alias. The third track of Stage 2, "What Does It Matter How My Heart Breaks", returns "Heartaches" in a lethargic tone and uses the Seger Ellis cover of the song. This specific version, in contrast to its Stage 1 counterpart, sounded downbeat to Kirby. By the second track of Stage 3, "And Heart Breaks", the last coherent version of "Heartaches" can be found, where its horn aspects become more similar to white noise. These tracks sampling "Heartaches" take their title from the sample's lyrics, which surround themes of memory; in the Al Bowlly cover, he sings: "I can't believe it's just a burning memory / Heartaches, heartaches / What does it matter how my heart breaks?"

=== Stages 4–6 ===
Everywhere at the End of Time – Stages 4–6
- Giltsholder, 2017; Eptitranxisticemestionscers Desending, 2017; Necrotomigaud, 2018

Studio album series by the Caretaker
- Genres: Choral; drone; glitch; noise; sound collage; surrealist
- Length: 87:19 (Stage 4); 88:19 (Stage 5); 85:57 (Stage 6)

The Caretaker chronology
Take Care. It's a Desert Out There... (2017)	Everywhere at the End of Time – Stages 4–6 (2018–2019)	Everywhere, an Empty Bliss (CD version) (2019)

Audio samples
- Stage 4: "H1 – Post Awareness Confusions": file; help
- Stage 6: "R1 – Place in the World Fades Away": file; help

Abruptly transitioning from Stage 3, Stage 4, to Kirby, is the point at which "the ability to recall singular memories gives way to confusions and horror". It presents heavy distortion and reverberation and is more akin to noise, in contrast to the first three albums, which featured the same style as An Empty Bliss. Marking the start of the "Post-Awareness" stages, its four compositions occupy whole vinyl side lengths of 21 to 22 minutes. Track titles were described as clinical by Bowe: G1, H1 and J1 share the name "Post Awareness Confusions", while I1 is titled "Temporary Bliss State". Samples from the entire Caretaker discography are used in the album, such as Russ Morgan's "Goodnight, My Beautiful" from An Empty Bliss. A horn sample from one specific segment of H1, known by fans as the "Hell Sirens", features harsh strings and drum crashes, presenting what Hazelwood felt was "one of the most horrifying moments of the series", and could represent sundowning, although the segment can be traced back as early as a BBC 6 guest mix in 2011. However, "Temporary Bliss State" is calmer than the "Post Awareness Confusions" tracks, featuring a more ethereal sound. The surreal and incoherent aspect of the melodies was compared by Bowe to experimental musician Oval's album 94 Diskont (1995), as they "capture the darkest, most damaged sounds in the project's lifespan". This, according to Kirby, represents the Caretaker's memories becoming "more fluid through entanglements, repetition and rupture".

Stage 5 has "more extreme entanglements, repetition and rupture [that] can give way to calmer moments", according to Kirby. The album expands its noise influence by replacing the previously coherent melodies with violently overlapped samples, resulting in a sound similar to the works of Merzbow and John Wiese. Tracks K1 and L1 share the name "Advanced Plaque Entanglements", while M1 and N1 are titled "Synapse Retrogenesis" and "Sudden Time Regression Into Isolation" respectively. Akin to Stage 4, track titles are clinical in nature and are directly named after structures and concepts such as amyloid plaques, neurofibrillary tangles, synapses and the retrogenesis hypothesis. In Kirby's description, the patient may perceive the unfamiliar as familiar and get isolated as their "time is often spent only in the moment". The record uses the most vocals of the series, including whispers and recognisable English words; near the end of K1, a man announces: "This selection will be a mandolin solo by Mr. James Fitzgerald", followed by a recording of him playing the El Capitan March. To Falisi, Stage 5 represents a metaphorical ghost causing the patient to lose their identity; whereas the first stages saw this ghost "drifting through a crumbled mansion, losing and lost", in Stage 5 it appears "compounding a failing system with the uncanny choke of absence".

Stage 6 is described by Kirby in only one sentence: "Post-Awareness Stage 6 is without description." The most interpretative record of the series, it consists of sound collages forming a void of sound in which music is audible, yet distant. The album is the most distant from the sound of An Empty Bliss and portrays feelings of anxiety, heartbreak, distress, isolation and other "unknown emotions, states and perspectives", according to The Quietus. While Stage 5 had snippets of instruments and voices, Stage 6 features mostly drowned, empty compositions consisting of hissing and crackling, which Hazelwood interpreted as portraying the patient's apathy. It is the only Post-Awareness stage to feature emotional rather than clinical song titles, which are, in order, "A Confusion So Thick You Forget Forgetting", "A Brutal Bliss Beyond This Empty Defeat", "Long Decline Is Over" and "Place in the World Fades Away". With the album, Kirby achieved what Andrew Ryce of Resident Advisor called the "blurring [of] the boundary between ambient music and sound art", which "forces the listener to come to terms with what Alzheimer's entails". After releasing Stage 6, Kirby compiled all six stages and uploaded them to YouTube in a single "complete" video, where he commented: "Thanks for the support through the years. May the ballroom remain eternal. C'est fini." (Note: French for "It's over.")

The final track, "Place in the World Fades Away", features organ drones, which have been compared to the 2014 film Interstellar's soundtrack. The organ eventually gives way to a needle drop and leads to the climax of the series six minutes before the project's end: a clearly audible choir sourced from a degraded vinyl record. The segment ends with a minute of silence, to represent the patient's death. Although the moment evoked varying interpretations from commentators, the most accepted theory by critics and medics is that it represents terminal lucidity, a phenomenon where patients suffering from neurological conditions experience a return of mental clarity shortly before death. Falisi considered it the movement of the patient's soul to the afterlife, while the sound itself was identified by Bandcamp Daily's Matt Mitchell as ending the series in "ethereal catharsis". The segment samples a performance of an English translation of Bach's aria "Lasst mich ihn nur noch einmal küssen" (Note: German for "Just Let Me Kiss Him One More Time".) of the St Luke Passion, BWV 246. This aria was also used on the track "Friends Past Reunited" from Selected Memories from the Haunted Ballroom (1999) and A Stairway to the Stars (2001), the Caretaker's first two albums, a fact interpreted by writer Paul Simpson of AllMusic as the alias in a "full circle moment".

== Production ==
Kirby produced Everywhere at the End of Time at his flat in Kraków using a computer "designed specifically for the production of music". He made more tracks for the first stage alone than in the alias' entire history. Each of the albums were produced at least a few months before their release; Stage 3's development began in September 2016, and Stage 6 began in May 2018. According to Kirby, the first three stages have "subtle but crucial differences", presenting the same general style "based on the mood and the awareness that a person with the condition would feel". He wanted the mastering process, done by Andreas "Lupo" Lubich, to be "consistent sounding all the way through". One of the compositional strategies of the series was to use various covers of sampled songs to associate specific emotional messages with each. Rather than buying physical records as he did with An Empty Bliss, Kirby found most samples online, and stated: "It's possible to find ten versions of one song now." He noted that Stage 1 looped short sections of songs while Stage 2 would let the samples fully play, and confirmed that this was intentional. Describing Stage 3 to be the most similar to An Empty Bliss, Kirby stated that Stages 1–3 could potentially be listened to on shuffle and still remain cohesive. Between the release of the third and fourth stages, he said he felt overwhelmed by the workload associated with the Caretaker and announced that he was "moving house and studio".

Kirby's production focus in Everywhere was on the last three stages, where he wanted to create what he called a "listenable chaos". In a Reddit comment, he later clarified that artificial intelligence was never involved in the production process of Stages 4–6, but rather an unspecified "piece of music software used in a way that it was not designed to be used". While producing Stage 4, Kirby realised that the final three stages "had to be made from the viewpoint of post-awareness", a term meaning that the patient no longer knows of their diagnosis. He reported feeling pressured while working on the final three stages, saying: "I'd be finishing one stage, mastering another, all whilst starting another stage." In composing the fourth and fifth stages, Kirby stated that he possessed over 200 hours of music and "compiled it based on mood". The Believer's Landon Bates likened Stage 4 to "Radio Music" (1956) by composer John Cage, to which Kirby responded that Cage's style of aleatoric music—music with random elements—actually inspired the production process of the later stages. Stage 5, according to Kirby, features "a distinct change" from Stage 4, writing that this difference is subtle but represents "a crucial symptom". The production of the final stage was the hardest for him, due to the public's expectations and "the weight of the previous five [stages] falling all on this now".

== Artwork and packaging ==
You can't trust any memories at all, can you? Because it's all glitched. It's all nonsense in a way.

— Ivan Seal

The album covers for Everywhere at the End of Time are abstract, still life oil-on-canvas paintings by Kirby's long-time friend Ivan Seal. They are minimalist in their style, each presenting a single object of focus and no text, and become less recognisable with each stage; as agreed upon by writer Luke Nixon, they are "just alien enough to keep [one] confused". Tiny Mix Tapes included Beaten Frowns After, the artwork for Stage 1, in their lists for best album covers of 2016 and of the 2010s. Some have compared the artistic themes of Kirby and Seal; like Kirby, Seal highlights memory as a central part of art, and said: "Art is always working from memory." Noting this overlap, Kirby said that both visions "collide in a great way".

The first three album covers are titled Beaten Frowns After (2016), Pittor Pickgown in Khatheinstersper (2015) and Hag (2014), respectively. Beaten Frowns After features a grey unravelling scroll on a vacant horizon, with newspaper folds similar to a brain's creases, likened by Teen Ink writer Sydney Leahy to the patient's potential awareness of the disease's progression. Pittor Pickgown in Khatheinstersper portrays four wilting flowers in an abstract rotten rock vase. Hag presents a kelp plant distorted to the extreme, which Sam Goldner of Tiny Mix Tapes described as "a vase spilling out into ripples of disorder".

The paintings for the final three stages are respectively titled Giltsholder (2017), Eptitranxisticemestionscers Desending (2017) and Necrotomigaud (2018). Giltsholder is the only artwork to present a human figure, in the form of a blue-and-green bust with unrecognisable facial features. According to Goldner, the figure appears smiling when viewed from a distance, while Leahy interpreted it as representing the patient's lack of capability to recognise a person. Considered the most abstract cover, Eptitranxisticemestionscers Desending depicts an abstract mass, which has been variously described as a woman, a marble-like staircase or both. Hazelwood interpreted it as representing the patient's mind, which once presented recognisable experiences now indistinguishable from noise. Necrotomigaud presents an art board with a square of loosely attached blue tape, reflecting the emotional emptiness of Stage 6.

Seal's paintings and the Caretaker's music were featured in the 2019 French art exhibition Everywhere, an Empty Bliss by the company FRAC Auvergne, which featured documents about the duo's work and revealed the names of the album covers. Seal's paintings were also previously featured near one of Kirby's performances in the Kraków 2019 exhibition Cukuwruums and later in the 2023 Paris event Ser Serpas. In 2018, when asked why the packaging of his releases did not present any descriptions, Kirby said that Seal's paintings are the main focus to each stage. He stated that liner notes would distract from Seal's art and that he kept them in digital form for listeners that "search a little deeper".

== Release and promotion ==
Kirby initially thought of not producing Everywhere at the End of Time at all. For months before the release of the first stage, he mentioned the concept to friends and family, explaining he "wanted to be sure it didn't come across as this highbrow, pretentious idea". The albums were released over a timespan of three years: the first stage in 2016, the next two in 2017, the penultimate two in 2018, and the final one in 2019. According to Kirby, the delays intended to "give a sense of time passing" to the listeners. Although he expressed concern with dementia as a social problem, Kirby said that the disorder does not affect him personally, noting how it turned into "more of a fascination than a fear" for him. He additionally stated that each dementia patient's experience is unique and that his portrayal was "only unique to the Caretaker". Initially, none of Kirby's music was available on Spotify and other streaming services due to his criticism of it. However, in December 2023, he uploaded his most popular albums as the Caretaker onto them, including all stages of Everywhere, mentioning their intellectual property as the main reason and citing "bad actors and snide uploaders" who monetised his work without his permission.

Stage 6 release note

When work began on this series it was difficult to predict how the music would unravel itself. Dementia is an emotive subject for many and always a subject I have treated with maximum respect.

Stages have all been artistic reflections of specific symptoms which can be common with the progression and advancement of the different forms of Alzheimer's.

Thanks always for your support of this series of works remembered by The Caretaker.

— James Leyland Kirby

When releasing the first stage on 22 September 2016, Kirby announced the series' concept, "diagnosing" the Caretaker alias with dementia through albums that reveal "progression, loss and disintegration" as they fell "towards the abyss of complete memory loss". This statement misled some to believe that Kirby himself had been diagnosed with early-onset dementia, namely The Fader's Jordan Darville and Marvin Lin of Tiny Mix Tapes. Both publications updated their posts when Kirby clarified that he did not have dementia; only the Caretaker persona did. He released Stage 3 and We, So Tired of All the Darkness in Our Lives on 28 September 2017, the latter under his own name, as well as Take Care. It's a Desert Out There... later in the year, a tribute album to English writer Mark Fisher. Releasing Stage 5, Kirby's press release compared the series' progression to the then-ongoing Brexit process. The Caretaker's final record, released alongside Stage 6, was Everywhere, an Empty Bliss (2019), a compilation album of scrapped material from Everywhere. In March 2022, Kirby released the single "We Are in the Shadow of a Distant Fire" under an unspecified alias, and later unlisted the track on his own channel.

Anonymous visual artist Weirdcore, known for creating visuals for electronic musician Aphex Twin, produced music videos for the first two stages. Both were uploaded to Kirby's YouTube channel vvmtest, which takes its name from his old record label V/Vm Test Records. Released in September 2016 and 2017, they feature effects such as time-stretching and delay, with Kirby saying their "otherworldy" visuals are important to his music. In 2020, Kirby and Weirdcore again collaborated in the YouTube video "[ -0° ]", which was chosen as one of the best audiovisual works of the year by Fact. In June 2026, the Caretaker's music was featured on "Presented Echoes of Virality", a video installment on Adult Swim's Ambient Swim series. As of 2026, there are no official music videos on vvmtest for the last four stages, nor any official announcements of a release date for them.

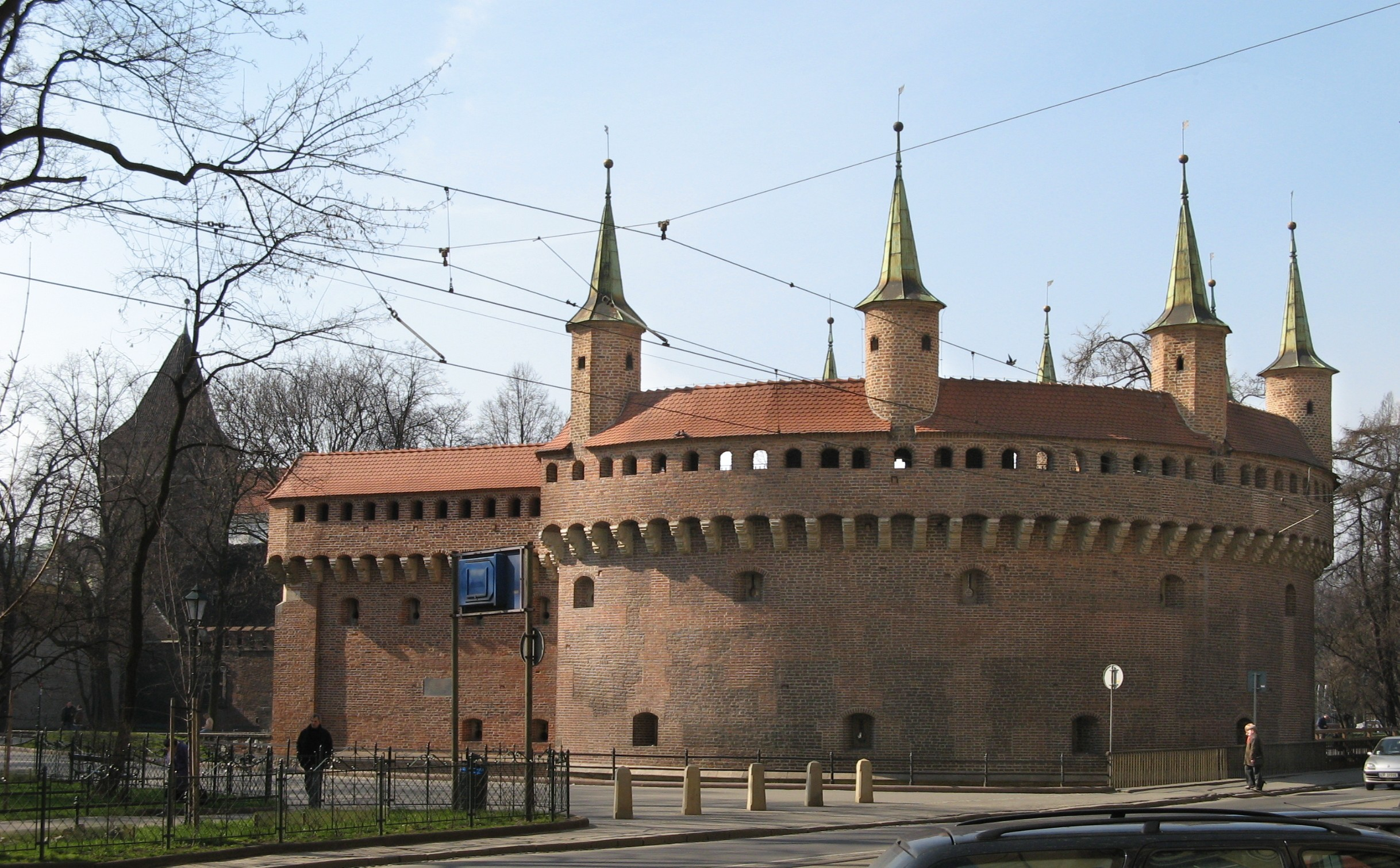
The Kraków Barbican, where Kirby performed in 2017

In December 2017, Kirby performed at the Kraków Barbican for the Unsound Festival in Poland. The show was his first since 2011 and featured Seal's art and Weirdcore's visuals. The music videos would be presented throughout the Caretaker's following shows. In March 2018, Kirby was featured at Festival Présences électronique in Paris, where he played a version of the 1944 song "Ce Soir" by singer Tino Rossi. He participated at Unsound's May 2019 "Solidarity" show, also set in Kraków. In April 2020, he was due to perform live for the "[Re]setting" Rewire Festival, which would have occurred at the Hague in the Netherlands. However, the show was cancelled due to the COVID-19 pandemic. Kirby performed at the Donaufestival in Krems' and Primavera Sound in Barcelona during 2022, while 2023 saw him hosting an Unsound performance in New York City. Although he previously expressed hesitation to perform, Kirby said each show would now be "a battle to make sense from the confusion". He added that Weirdcore would bring Seal's paintings "alive" and that the visual art would explore the idea of making the audience "feel ill".

== Critical reception ==
Professional ratings
Review scores
Source	Rating
AllMusic	(Stages 1–3) (Stages 4–6)
Ondarock	9/10 (Stage 1); 8/10 (Stage 6)
Pitchfork	7.3/10 (Stage 1); 7.9/10 (Stage 4)
Resident Advisor	4.3/5 (Stage 6)
Sputnikmusic	5.0/5 (Stages 1–6)
Tiny Mix Tapes	4/5 (Stage 1); 3.5/5 (Stage 2); 4.5/5 (Stage 4); 3.5/5 (Stage 5); 4.5/5 (Stage 6)

Everywhere at the End of Time received increasingly positive reactions as it progressed and was, overall, met with universal acclaim. Of the project's more widespread success relative to An Empty Bliss, NPR writer Meaghan Garvey said that Kirby's concept of representing Alzheimer's in music was "loaded beyond the capacities of a 40-some-minute ambient record", while Kelly Scanlon of Far Out Magazine stated that he went beyond the previous record's "day in a life" portrayal. Conversely, Paste's Matt Mitchell wrote that no track in the series has the "grievous splendor" of "Libet's Delay", one of the most popular tracks from An Empty Bliss. In March 2021, Everywhere peaked as the best-selling record on Boomkat, the platform Kirby uses for his physical releases. Initially, in response to "today's culture of instant reaction", Kirby said that "these parts have been looped for a specific reason ... which will become clear down the line".

The first three stages of the series were criticised for their portrayal of dementia. Pitchfork contributor Brian Howe expressed concern for the romanticised view of Alzheimer's in Stage 1. He found Kirby's description inaccurate; Howe "watched [his] grandmother succumb to it for a decade before she died, and it was very little like a 'beautiful daydream'. In fact, there was nothing aesthetic about it." Pat Beane of Tiny Mix Tapes considered Stage 1 the most "pleasurable listen from [t]he Caretaker", while Falisi regarded Stage 2 as neither "decay or beauty", "diagnosis or cure". Entropy considered Stage 3 the most intriguing of the first three stages, as it portrays the sensitive topic of dementia with "moving tenderness". The album was alternatively described by Hazelwood as continuing Kirby's default "bag of tricks", although she nevertheless argued that "without those stages and their comforts, the transition into Stage 4 wouldn't have the crushing impact it does".

Critics generally agreed that Kirby's portrayal of dementia improved with Stages 4–6. Pitchfork contributor Miles Bowe described Stage 4 as avoiding "a risk of pale romanticization", and Goldner felt that the record had "broken the loop", although he added that "Temporary Bliss State" is not "real dementia". Falisi, referring to Goldner's description of the "broken loop" in Stage 4, considered such loop in Stage 5 to be "unspooling (endlessly) off the capstans and piling up until new shapes form". He praised the fifth stage's "four sprawled teeth of tracks" for completely abandoning the comfort of Stage 1, saying that the record "hurts". Characterisations of Stage 6 ranged from "a mental descent rendered in agonizingly slow motion" to "something extra-ambient whose aches are of the cosmos". Commentators often described the last stage with additional praise; one called it a "jaw-dropping piece of sonic art" with "a unique force".

Critics have also commented on the interpretative nature, "thought-provoking" feelings and "nightmare fuel" sounds evoked by the series as a whole. Dave Gurney of Tiny Mix Tapes called the compilation "disturbing", while Hazelwood said that its music "sticks with you, its melodies haunting and infecting". Luka Vukos, in his review for the blog HeadStuff, argued that the "empathy machine" of the series "is characterized not by words" but rather "rests in [Kirby's] marrying of [the vinyl record] with the most contemporary modes of digital recall and manipulation". Having written about some of Kirby's earlier music, Simon Reynolds said that the Caretaker "could have renamed himself the Caregiver, for on this project he resembles a sonic nurse in a hospice for the terminally ill". In his opinion, Kirby's names for the tracks are "heartbreaking and often describe the music more effectively than the reviewer ever could".

=== Accolades ===
Everywhere at the End of Time appeared the most on year-end lists of The Quietus and Tiny Mix Tapes. The latter reviewed each album, except for Stage 3, and gave the first, fourth and sixth stages the "EUREKA!" award, given to albums "explor[ing] the limits of noise and music" and "worthy of careful consideration". Resident Advisor included Stage 6 in its listing of 2019's best albums. Quietus contributor Maria Perevedentseva chose "We Don't Have Many Days" as one of the best songs of 2016, and Stage 5 would later be included in the publication's listing of the best music of September 2018. Stage 6 was named the website's "Lead Review" of the week and the best "miscellaneous" music release of 2019. The series also received three votes on the Quietus year-end annual rewind: one for Stage 6 and two for the complete edition.

Accolades for Everywhere at the End of Time
Album	Year	Publication	List	Rank	Ref.
Stage 1	2016	The Quietus	Year-end	16	
Stage 1	2016	Tiny Mix Tapes	Year-end	35	
Stage 2	2017	The Quietus	Semester-end	88	
Stage 3	2017	The Quietus	Year-end	39	
Stage 4	2018	Tiny Mix Tapes	Year-end	26	
Stage 4	2018	The Quietus	Semester-end	37	
Stage 5	2018	The Quietus	Year-end	45	
Stage 6	2019	The Quietus	Semester-end	59	
Stage 6	2019	Obscure Sound	Year-end	19	
Stage 6	2019	Ondarock	Year-end	38	
Stage 6	2019	Il Giornale della Musica	Year-end	12	
Stages 1–6	2019	A Closer Listen	Decade-end	4	
Stages 1–6	2019	Tiny Mix Tapes	Decade-end	41	
Stages 1–6	2019	Ondarock	Decade-end	42	
Stages 1–6	2019	Spex	Decade-end	133	
Stages 1–6	2019	Resident Advisor	Quarter-century-end	55	
Stages 4–6	2019	The Wire	Year-end	35	

== Impact and popularity ==
Everywhere at the End of Time is regarded by several critics and musicians, including James Webster of vaporwave group Death's Dynamic Shroud, as the Caretaker's magnum opus. It was named one of the "scariest pieces of music ever" by Geordie Gray of Vinyl Group's Tone Deaf and the "heaviest album ever" by Swedish metal musician Buster Odeholm. The albums in the series are considered some of the best of the 2010s, and the chaos of the fourth and fifth stages was remarked for its perceived imposition of contemplative power unto the listener. Its conceptualisation of dementia was described by The Vinyl Factory as "remarkably emotive" and by Vogue's Corey Seymour as "life-changing". Tiny Mix Tapes writer Jessie Dunn Rovinelli said that the expectations set by Kirby for the project were met, "all of them, head on", and called it a "masterpiece", while Darren McGarvey of Daily Record felt "struck by a deep sense of gratitude" after finishing the series. Author Adam Flynn highlighted Everywhere as the culmination of "an extremely important corpus of work of this century", while Cole Quinn called it the greatest album of all time. Inspired by the Caretaker, several vaporwave musicians whose elder relatives had dementia released the 100-track album Memories Overlooked in 2017. Simon Reynolds, in Resident Advisor's list of the best electronic releases from the first quarter of the 21st century, concluded: "Conceptually immaculate, consummately executed and emotionally devastating, Everywhere at the End of Time is the ultimate work of hauntological electronic sound art."

=== In Internet culture ===
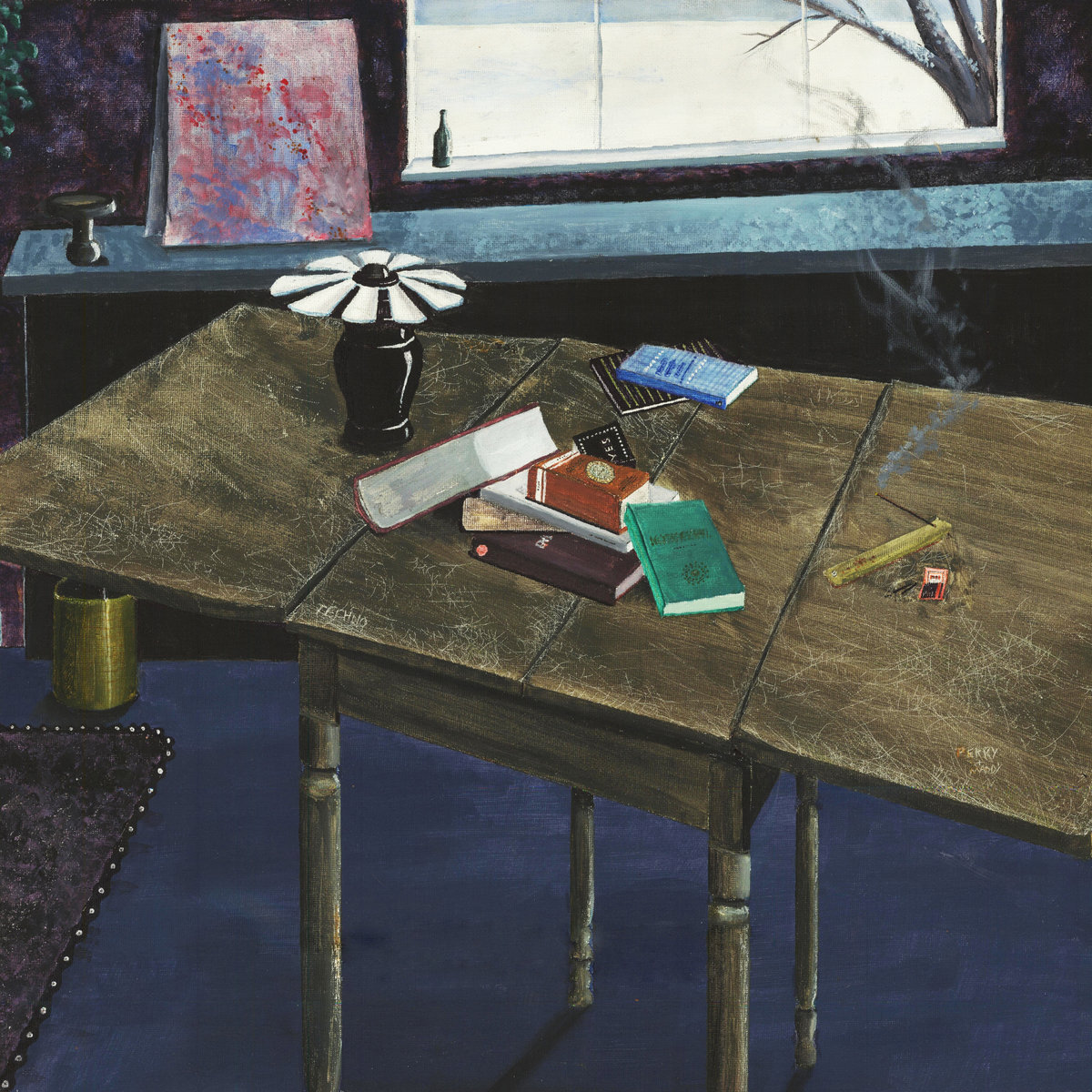
The album cover of Memories Overlooked (2017)

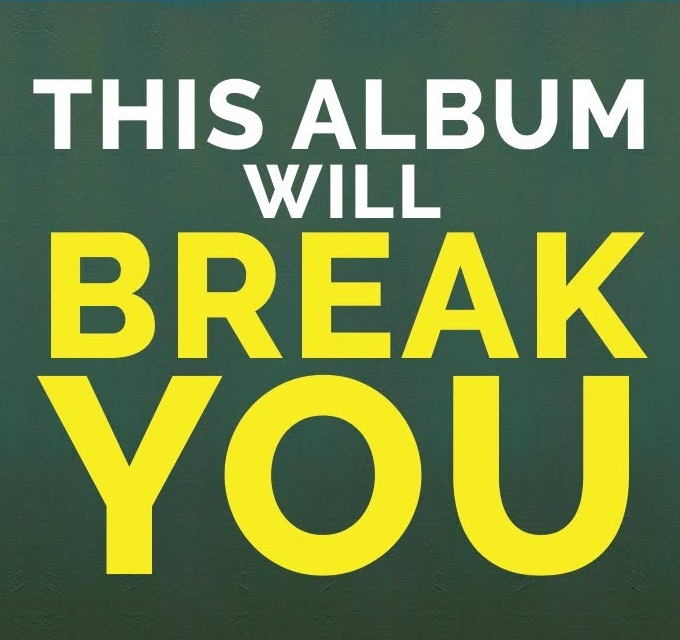
The thumbnail of a YouTube video about Everywhere

In 2017, various vaporwave musicians released the seven-hour-long compilation album Memories Overlooked in tribute of the Caretaker alias. In 2020, Internet users popularised the series for its "breaking" reflection of dementia, resulting in the creation of creepypasta and meme-related content.

In January 2020, American YouTuber Solar Sands uploaded the video "Can You Name One Object In This Photo?", which partly examines the abstract aspects of Seal's art in combination with the concept and stages in Everywhere. It received over four million views as of 2026, while another video by French YouTuber Feldup received almost a million. Later in October, users on the social media platform TikTok created a challenge of listening to the entire series in one sitting, due to its long length and existential themes. Kirby knew about the phenomenon from an exponential growth of views on the series' YouTube upload, over 39 million as of 2026; only 12% of them came from the platform's algorithm, whereas direct searches made up over 50%. In a video some writers hypothesized as the cause of Everywhere's popularity, YouTuber A Bucket of Jake called the series "the darkest album I have ever heard" and also references the video by Solar Sands. Following its popularity, the series appeared more often on Bandcamp's ambient recommendations.

Some TikTok users shared fictional creepypasta stories of Everywhere with claims that it cures patients or, conversely, that it introduces symptoms of dementia in people. The claims and the listening challenge triggered a negative backlash from others, who felt that it offended Alzheimer's patients and the purpose of the series itself. Kirby, in contrast to these complaints, saw the phenomenon in a positive light, highlighting those who may have gained "an understanding into the symptoms a person with dementia may face". Lazlo Rugoff of the Vinyl Factory found the TikTok phenomenon drew "an unlikely audience" of teenagers to Kirby's music, while Conor Lochrie of Tone Deaf opined that teens, rather than being disrespectful, "were devoting themselves to ... challenging art". The project was later called by TikTok's William Gruger a niche discovery and "unexpected hit".

Everywhere has seen continued use as a meme throughout the early 2020s, partly coinciding with the period of the COVID-19 pandemic and its mental health impact on teenagers. In 2021, it gained attention among the modding community of the rhythm game Friday Night Funkin' (2020) with the mod Everywhere at the End of Funk, which was described by Wren Romero of esports group Gamurs as "one of the most unique experiences of any FNF mod". During the end of her Coachella 2024 performance, the American singer Lana Del Rey played a live version of "It's Just a Burning Memory"; she related to the series after witnessing her grandfather's struggle with dementia and said that it was "a beautiful song ... [which] perfectly embodied both sides of the coin of the rise and the fall of that era". Along with Mark Fisher's books, the project was also one of the main points of inspiration for the visual novel Dusk Index: Gion (2026), as writer Jen Williams felt it was "devastating" and "crystallised her preoccupation with being trapped in the past" following the release of Tokyo Dark (2017).

The series was also popularised for its relation to the Backrooms, a creepypasta about an endless empty office space. Writer Silvia Trevisson said that this stemmed from their similar portrayals of absurd states of mind, while projectionist Harry Nordlinger commented that warped styles as liminal spaces and the analog horror subgenre end up reflecting on Everywhere, as such visuals form the zeitgeist of Millennial and Gen Z individuals. In 2026, the Stage 1 track "All That Follows Is True" was used by entertainment company A24 for Backrooms, a film inspired by the original creepypasta. Accompanying other pieces of similarly "liminal music", such as the previously lost media song "Ulterior Motives" and the Boards of Canada track "The Word Becomes Flesh", it received a 203% increase in popularity on streaming services, according to Billboard. In the film, the blue tape outlining the entrance to the Backrooms references the Stage 6 cover art Necrotomigaud.

=== Scientific response ===
Within neurological research groups, Everywhere at the End of Time has been seen as a generally positive influence. One Iowa State University researcher found the series to present the "chilling reality" of Alzheimer's disease, highlighting the gradual progression of calmness into confusion. Brian Browne, the president of Dementia Care Education, said that Kirby's portrayal of Alzheimer's disease is "a much welcome thing" to caretakers of dementia patients. He praised the series' newfound attention, as "it produces the empathy that's needed".

Browne concludes:

The composer of this music really was onto something in terms of being able to—through the medium of music—lead a younger generation on a journey through the sounds of what the brain is going through, through a dementing process.

Partially positive of Kirby's work, French neuropsychologist Hervé Platel praised Everywhere's approach, but perceived its portrayal of dementia as too linear; he said that the series, while faithful in its representation, gives an inaccurate impression of a total and unilateral degradation of memory. In particular, Platel highlighted how music-related memory is the most resistant to the effects of neurodegenerative diseases such as Alzheimer's.

== Track listing ==
Adapted from Bandcamp. (Note: For unknown reasons, each Post-Awareness track lists its respective stage within the title, which is omitted here to avoid redundancy.) Notes adapted from Kirby's YouTube uploads of Stages 1–3, Stages 4–6, and the complete edition.

Stage 1
No.	Title	Length
1.	"A1 – It's just a burning memory"	3:32
2.	"A2 – We don't have many days"	3:30
3.	"A3 – Late afternoon drifting"	3:35
4.	"A4 – Childishly fresh eyes"	2:58
5.	"A5 – Slightly bewildered"	2:01
6.	"A6 – Things that are beautiful and transient"	4:34
7.	"B1 – All that follows is true"	3:31
8.	"B2 – An autumnal equinox"	2:46
9.	"B3 – Quiet internal rebellions" (replaced by Stage 3's "Long term dusk glimpses" on YouTube)	3:30
10.	"B4 – The loves of my entire life"	4:04
11.	"B5 – Into each others eyes"	4:36
12.	"B6 – My heart will stop in joy"	2:41
Total length:		41:20

Stage 2
No.	Title	Length
13.	"C1 – A losing battle is raging"	4:37
14.	"C2 – Misplaced in time"	4:42
15.	"C3 – What does it matter how my heart breaks"	2:37
16.	"C4 – Glimpses of hope in trying times"	4:43
17.	"C5 – Surrendering to despair"	5:03
18.	"D1 – I still feel as though I am me"	4:07
19.	"D2 – Quiet dusk coming early"	3:36
20.	"D3 – Last moments of pure recall"	3:52
21.	"D4 – Denial unravelling"	4:16
22.	"D5 – The way ahead feels lonely" (titled "The Away [sic] Ahead Feels Lonely" on Weirdcore's video)	4:15
Total length:		41:50

Stage 3
No.	Title	Length
23.	"E1 – Back there Benjamin"	4:14
24.	"E2 – And heart breaks"	4:05
25.	"E3 – Hidden sea buried deep"	1:20
26.	"E4 – Libet's all joyful camaraderie"	3:12
27.	"E5 – To the minimal great hidden"	1:41
28.	"E6 – Sublime beyond loss"	2:10
29.	"E7 – Bewildered in other eyes" (titled "Bewildered in others eyes" on the Stage 3 Boomkat page)	1:51
30.	"E8 – Long term dusk glimpses"	3:33
31.	"F1 – Gradations of arms length"	1:31
32.	"F2 – Drifting time misplaced" (titled "Drifting time replaced" on the Stage 3 YouTube upload)	4:15
33.	"F3 – Internal bewildered World"	3:29
34.	"F4 – Burning despair does ache"	2:37
35.	"F5 – Aching cavern without lucidity"	1:19
36.	"F6 – An empty bliss beyond this World"	3:36
37.	"F7 – Libet delay"	3:57
38.	"F8 – Mournful cameraderie [sic]"	2:39
Total length:		45:29

Stage 4
No.	Title	Length
39.	"G1 – Post Awareness Confusions"	22:09
40.	"H1 – Post Awareness Confusions"	21:53
41.	"I1 – Temporary Bliss State"	21:01
42.	"J1 – Post Awareness Confusions"	22:16
Total length:		87:19

Stage 5
No.	Title	Length
43.	"K1 – Advanced plaque entanglements"	22:35
44.	"L1 – Advanced plaque entanglements"	22:48
45.	"M1 – Synapse retrogenesis"	20:48
46.	"N1 – Sudden time regression into isolation"	22:08
Total length:		88:19

Stage 6
No.	Title	Length
47.	"O1 – A confusion so thick you forget forgetting" (excludes the "A" on Boomkat)	21:52
48.	"P1 – A brutal bliss beyond this empty defeat"	21:36
49.	"Q1 – Long decline is over"	21:09
50.	"R1 – Place in the World fades away"	21:19
Total length:		85:57

== Personnel ==
Credits adapted from YouTube.

- James Leyland Kirby – producer
- Ivan Seal – artwork
- Andreas Lubich – mastering

== Release history ==
All released worldwide by record label History Always Favours the Winners.

Stages 1–3
Date	Format	Catalog number	Ref.
12 October 2017	Triple CD; digital download	HAFTWCD0103	
7 April 2019	Triple LP	HAFTW025026027-SET	

Stages 4–6
Date	Format	Catalog number	Ref.
14 March 2019	Quadruple CD; digital download	HAFTWCD0406	
14 March 2019	Sextuple LP	HAFTW028029030-SET	

== See also ==
- Alzheimer's disease in the media
- It's Such a Beautiful Day (2012), a film series portraying mental illness and mortality
- List of concept albums
- Music therapy for Alzheimer's disease
- William Utermohlen, an artist with Alzheimer's disease who drew self-portraits to chronicle the disorder's advancement
