= An Empty Bliss Beyond This World =

- Ivan Seal, Happy in Spite (2010), oil on canvas

Studio album by the Caretaker
- Released: 1 June 2011
- Studio: Flats in Berlin
- Genre: Ambient; dance band; easy listening; plunderphonics; conceptual art; tone poem
- Length: 45:21
- Label: History Always Favours the Winners
- Producer: Leyland Kirby

The Caretaker chronology
The Complete Digital Collection (1996 - 2008) (2009)	An Empty Bliss Beyond This World (2011)	Patience (After Sebald) (2012)

An Empty Bliss Beyond This World (stylized as “An empty bliss beyond this World”) is the ninth studio album by the Caretaker, an ambient music project of English musician Leyland Kirby, released on 1 June 2011 through History Always Favours the Winners.

The record is based on a study regarding people with Alzheimer's disease being able to remember music they listened to when they were younger, as well as where they were and how they felt listening to it. The album samples pre-World War II ballroom records Kirby bought in Brooklyn in December 2010. This theme of Alzheimer's in music would be greatly expanded from 2016 to 2019 through Kirby's final series of albums as The Caretaker, Everywhere at the End of Time.

An Empty Bliss Beyond This World was the Caretaker's breakthrough album, garnering critical acclaim upon its release and earning several year-end accolades. Pitchfork has called it the 75th best album of the first half of the 2010s as well as the 14th best ambient album of all time.

== Concept ==
An Empty Bliss Beyond This World reflects, with broken sounds, the mind of an Alzheimer's patient who struggles to remember parts of their life. The record was based on a 2010 study about the ability of people with the disease to remember music from their time, as well as their context within the patient's life. The Caretaker project was inspired by the ballroom music in films such as Carnival of Souls (1962), The Shining (1980), and the television series Pennies from Heaven (1978), which drew Kirby to themes of memory loss: "Famously, people as they got older have started seeing dead people, people from the past, and that's their reality because the brain's misfiring. I'm very interested in these kinds of stories. Music's probably the last thing to go for a lot of people with advanced Alzheimer's."

Critic Rowan Savage compared the album to Mark Z. Danielewski's novel House of Leaves (2000) due to its "endless and fearfully cavernous space (the ballroom) existing concealed by the deceptive limitations of familiar domesticity" represented with a deep resonant sound. Some tracks on An Empty Bliss appear twice but are sampled differently, such as the title track and "Mental Caverns Without Sunshine." Kirby explained this was done to give it a déjà vu vibe: "Immediately upon first listen, you’re already questioning where you have heard this song before." The second version of "Mental Caverns Without Sunshine" is only half as long as the first. According to Savage, the repetitive aspects of the album question the listener if "[their] sense of familiarity spring[s] from the loop[s] [themselves] or from the very patina that inheres in the scratchy turntable record as such".

An Empty Bliss has retrofuturistic themes of disputes between the distant past and the envisioned future similar to Into Outer Space with Lucia Pamela (1969). Savage labeled the album a commentary on modern music that "coloni[zes]" and "dehistoricize[s]" works from the past. He compared the album to when Gary Numan sang "I'm Vera Lynn" on the track "War Songs." Describing "War Songs" as a "peculiar evocation of the 30s and 50s as vocodered through eerie 80s electro," Savage explained:

It's as if Kirby, speaking to a postmodern generation steeped in Stone-cold revivalism [...] is asking: "You call that retro? This is retro" (but also, this is what retro is, and that may not be the comfortable appropriation you're familiar with).

== Production ==
Initially, Kirby did not plan out making An Empty Bliss. Its making started when he shopped at a Brooklyn store in December 2010 and bought a ten-dollar collection of numerous ballroom records. The records would be left unused for a while until he was in a Berlin flat, where he spent around a month tracking them by playing them on a broken turntable. He then transferred the recordings to a digital recorder he obtained while vacationing in Spain during the 2010 eruptions of Eyjafjallajökull. By the time he moved to another flat, he edited and mixed the recordings. The artwork, named Happy in Spite, was painted in 2010 by Kirby's long-time friend Ivan Seal.

== Composition ==
An Empty Bliss Beyond This World uses snippets of several 78-rpm ballroom records. It drew comparisons to William Basinski's album series The Disintegration Loops (2002) and the music for the BioShock series, as well as the works of Philip Jeck, Ekkehard Ehlers and Gavin Bryars. The first tracks in An Empty Bliss feature the most prominent samples. Surrounding these samples are vinyl scratches, as well as click and pop sounds; these, in Savage's opinion, are "steampunk glitches." The sounds become more filtered in echo as each track goes on. It is unknown if Kirby added these echo filters or if they are a part of the original recordings, which Savage interpreted as giving the album an "affective" vibe. As the album progresses, the samples become more fragmented and unnoticeable, the sounds stop staying at both stereo channels, and the tracks become shorter. This is all until "Camaraderie at Arms Length," which ends the album with a clear repeat of the samples heard in the first tracks.

The focus of the album is how the audio sources are altered and edited. As Powell wrote, An Empty Bliss has a "mindless" method of editing audio sources to represent "the fragmented and inconclusive ways our memories work." The tracks "never feel filled-in from start to finish, and they tend to linger on moments that feel especially comforting or conclusive." The album also has a "jump cut" method of transitioning between each track and noticeable skipping through melodic samples; some songs end abruptly in what feels like their mid-way point. The album slowly develops changes in reverb, echo, and noise. The echo was noted by some critics to give the album a ghost-like ominous feel, while Powell wrote that the crooked editing is what gave the album its eerie feel: "The source material is music designed not only to comfort, but to sound like it existed before you: hymns, love songs, lullabies. Bliss is eerie because it takes the seduction of those forms and turns it slightly askew."

While Andrew Ryce of Resident Advisor felt An Empty Bliss as "overbearingly depressive," others described the album in a brighter tone. Savage said the record differs from the Caretaker's past "dissonant and reverberated" releases in that it has a tone more "subtle and disconcertingly reassuring—as if the shades of the Overlook Hotel, in imploring the caretaker to join them, were to ask that he should do so through the medium of suicide rather than murder." This was similarly remarked in Powell's review of the album, in which he wrote that "there's something at least metaphorically beautiful—even slightly funny—about living inside a locked groove, dancing with nobody." In addition to its bright feel, An Empty Bliss also differs from past Caretaker works in that, whereas samples were obscured via extensive pitch-shifting and reverb, samples are much clearer here. While most of the tracks on the album end suddenly, the album's closer fades out, representing, in Savage's opinion, a "memento mori that must go hand-in-hand with the resurrection of sounds as temporally distant as these, with the re-giving of the name and hence finitude, the entry (or, rather, re-entry) into mercilessly linear history."

== Critical reception ==
Professional ratings
Aggregate scores
Source	Rating
Metacritic	82/100
Review scores
Source	Rating
AllMusic	5/5 stars
Cokemachineglow	70%
Mojo	4/5 stars
Pitchfork	8.2/10
PopMatters	7/10
Resident Advisor	4/5
Sputnikmusic	3.5/5
Tiny Mix Tapes	5/5 stars

An Empty Bliss Beyond This World was the Caretaker's breakthrough album. Nick Butler of Sputnikmusic called it one of the most "beguiling" albums of 2011. He highlighted the album's mixture of two different vibes, that the samples used are "often jolly and very dated to the point of arguably being irrelevant to modern ears," and the overall music is "very modern [...] and very depressing." He analysed that these two tones "don't match at all, and it sends [the listener's] brain into overdrive trying to figure it all out, trying to work out where the link is between those two extremes is." James Knapman of Igloo magazine labeled it Kirby's most "endearing" work due to its combination of light and haunting tones: "What it asks of the listener is a sense of humour and the ability to actively enjoy the aged source material that Kirby has spliced and looped together. It's a truly haunting experience that is buoyed up by a heady dose of nostalgia and affection that bestows upon it an oddly lilting quality."

Simon Reynolds labeled An Empty Bliss an "excellent" example of a record using hauntology themes. Michael Lovino, writing for No Ripcord, analysed, "there's a mysterious sense that what we're listening to is pure fantasy, designed to perplex our constant perception of our reality, of the moment, now, as we experience it, right now. This may just be the first record that emits such a strange feeling with such sublime ghostliness." He highlighted the album's ability to achieve a "perplexing and strenuous" task of inducing many emotions into the listener, writing that "Kirby does it with a special kind of grace." Ryce called An Empty Bliss "evocative, heart-tugging stuff," stating that "when knowledge of Kirby's intent lurks underneath the damaged acetate grooves, it becomes something else entirely: A poignant interrogation of memory loss and aging." He opined it was far superior to most other ambient albums that "get lost in their own delusions of grandeur vis a vis elaborate concepts," describing the edits done to the samples as "simplistic" but "so horrifyingly effective it's hard to feel anything but awestruck."

Andrew Hall of Cokemachineglow described An Empty Bliss as "a remarkably cohesive listen and one that achieves its goals, but whether or not it, in and of itself, is an entirely creative work is another question entirely." He praised the album's unique sampling style and "careful" sequencing. However, he also felt it was "like a glorified mix with a handful of treatments made to emphasize specific elements of the music being manipulated," writing that "it already has prompted difficult to address questions over ownership, credit, and just how much work actually goes into creating a finished product when working through a method like Kirby's." In an October 2014 BDCwire article, Tyler Cumella labeled An Empty Bliss Beyond This World one of the most "fascinating" records of the 2010s. He stated that the album "has the overall quality of something slipping through your fingers, like a memory that you are struggling to cling onto. Rarely has an album created such a haunting, insular look at the life of the mind." He compared the record to The Shining, the film that helped inspire the album, in that they "perfectly capture the sense of a faltering mind, with past and present blurring together into a beautifully eerie whole."

Retrospectively reviewing the album for AllMusic, Paul Simpson awarded it five stars and summarised that it "quickly became a cult classic, and has since been regarded as one of the defining works of hauntology, a concept evoking cultural memory, which has also been present in discussions of other British artists such as Burial and the Ghost Box label." Simpson also called it "a profoundly beautiful, thought-provoking work of art." The concept of An Empty Bliss would eventually be expanded to six albums on Everywhere at the End of Time, a series exploring the mental deterioration of dementia through six stages.

== Accolades ==
An Empty Bliss Beyond This World landed at number 22 on Pitchfork's list of the "Top 50 Albums of 2011". It later made its way to number 75 on the publication's list of the best albums of the first half of the 2010s decade (2010 to 2014) and number 14 on their list of the greatest ambient albums of all time. Gorilla vs. Bear ranked it 14th on their list of the best albums of 2011, with writer Chris calling it "some of the loveliest, most heartbreaking anonymous music we never knew we needed," while Uncut magazine placed it at number 47 on their year-end list. In 2013, the album was ranked 79th on a list of "The Top 130 Albums" of the previous five years by Beats per Minute.

An Empty Bliss Beyond This World was ranked fourth on a year-end list by Tiny Mix Tapes of 2011's best releases, with journalist Embling describing the LP as "relevant and necessary" due to the year's rise in the number of films that were "antique revisions, early 20th-century histories made conveniently, divertingly neat" and "tinsel-toned recreations of a world that never actually was, much as we sometimes wish it had been." These films included Captain America: The First Avenger, Midnight in Paris, The Artist, and Hugo. Embling wrote that with the album, "Leyland Kirby presented pre-war 78s in their current, decaying condition, as a testament to the things that cannot be restored, those people, moments, and memories lost to time, out of reach and forever unrecoverable."

== Track listing ==
Original release
No.	Title	Length
1.	"All you are going to want to do is get back there"	3:46
2.	"Moments of sufficient lucidity"	3:47
3.	"The great hidden sea of the unconscious"	3:02
4.	"Libet's delay"	3:26
5.	"I feel as if I might be vanishing"	1:55
6.	"An empty bliss beyond this World"	4:19
7.	"Bedded deep in longterm memory"	1:48
8.	"A relationship with the sublime"	3:36
9.	"Mental caverns without Sunshine"	3:13
10.	"Pared back to the minimal"	1:45
11.	"Mental caverns without Sunshine"	1:35
12.	"An empty bliss beyond this World"	3:48
13.	"Tiny gradiations of loss"	2:52
14.	"Camaraderie at arms length"	4:45
15.	"The sublime is disappointingly elusive"	1:44
Total length:		45:21

Bonus Tracks
No.	Title	Length
16.	"Fleeting dreams"	3:03
17.	"Their story is lost"	3:58
Total length:		52:26
