= Ivan Seal =

English painter and sound artist (born 1973)

- Born: 22 May 1973 (age 53); Stockport, Manchester, England
- Education: Sheffield Hallam University, 1992–1995
- Occupations: Painter and Experimental Musician
- Years active: 2006–present
- Known for: Producing album covers for musician James Leyland Kirby
- Website: ivanseal.com

Ivan Seal (born 22 May 1973) is an English painter and sound artist who specializes in surreal and abstract works centred around concepts of memory and the creation of imagined objects. He is best known for his collaborations with ambient musician James Leyland Kirby, also known as The Caretaker, creating artwork for the critically acclaimed albums: An Empty Bliss Beyond This World and the six part album series Everywhere at the End of Time, both of which examine themes of memory loss through the long-term mental decay brought about by dementia.

== Biography ==
=== Early life ===
Ivan Seal was born in Stockport, England on 22 May 1973. Little is known about Seal's early life aside from attending Sheffield Hallam University from 1992 to 1995, during which Seal began to experiment with creating art installations using ambient music as a medium. During this period, Seal became close friends with another experimental musician from Stockport, James Leyland Kirby, who was creating music under the name "V/Vm". At some point during 2004 following his studies, Seal moved to Berlin, Germany, where he currently resides.

=== Career ===
Nopossibiseallityarv leevin (2019), a painting showcasing Seal's abstract art, as well as the names of his paintings.

Seal's first known exhibition was as a part of the 2006 "Anonymous" exhibition at the Schirn Kunsthalle in Frankfurt, Germany, in which he was one of 11 anonymous artists featured. Through the years between 2006 and 2010, Seal's ambient music installations and paintings were featured within group and solo exhibitions throughout the Berlin art scene.

Ivan Seal held his first major solo exhibition "personality disorders" at the Carl Freedman Gallery in London starting in May 2011. Following his initial exhibition, Seal returned to showcase his works at the same gallery in 2013, 2015, and 2021. Alongside these semi-regular exhibitions, Seal's works have been exhibited in galleries across Europe and the United States.

==== Collaborations with James Leyland Kirby ====
In June 2011, James Leyland Kirby, under his moniker The Caretaker, released his breakthrough album An Empty Bliss Beyond This World, which featured Seal's 2010 work "happy in spite" as the album cover, giving both artists a large boost in popularity due to the critical acclaim for the album. Seal's art had been previously used by Kirby for Persistent Repetition of Phrases, released in 2008, but the usage of Seal's artwork for An Empty Bliss Beyond This World resulted in a continued collaborative relationship between the two artists. In 2012, Seal's artwork was once again used by Kirby as the album cover for the soundtrack to Grant Gee's film Patience (After Sebald).

Ivan Seal and Kirby's relationship is most well known due to the album artwork Seal created for Everywhere at the End of Time, a six-part album series released throughout 2016 to 2019 which was meant to musically emulate the mental decay caused by dementia and Alzheimer's disease.
