= Sick-Love =

Remix album by V/Vm
- Released: 2000
- Genres: Dance; disco; drone; experimental; industrial; noise; plunderphonics; pop; sampledelia; noise pop
- Length: 71:56
- Label: V/Vm Test
- Producer: Leyland Kirby

Leyland Kirby chronology
Selected Memories from the Haunted Ballroom (1999)	Sick-Love (2000)	The Green Door (2000)

V/Vm chronology
Sick-Love (2000)	The Green Door (2000)

Singles from Sick-Love
- 1. "The Lady in Red (Is Dancing With Meat)"

Sick-Love is the debut remix album by V/Vm, an alias of English musician Leyland Kirby. Released in 2000, it samples several 1960s-1990s pop songs about love, distorting them to create a sinister atmosphere. The album is mostly unavailable physically because of copyright laws; V/Vm later released the similar album The Green Door. Met with a positive reception from music critics, the album and its single received airplay on various radio stations, achieving the NME title of single of the week.

== Composition ==
Sick-Love comprises several covers of 1960s-1990s pop songs about love that are put through various sound effects, such as pitch shifting. Most of the songs are recognizable for those who have listened to them before; however, they are distorted to an extreme noise, though not as much as V/Vm's other album The Green Door. Artists and bands sampled include East 17, Bobby Brown, Billy Joel, Berlin, the Bee Gees, Elton John, Robbie Williams, The Beatles, John Lennon, Boyzone, and Yazoo. Other dance and disco tracks of the record feature new vocals or distortions of existing ones that make the original samples nearly unrecognizable. There are sound effects such as background buzz noises, saxophones with distorted notes, and growling vocals.

The third track, "The Lady in Red (Is Dancing With Meat)", samples the song of same name by singer Chris de Burgh and distorts it with the intent of rendering it sinister. Its vocal drone is pitched down and distorted so as to sound akin to releases of the Raster-Noton record label. The following track, "I Need Lard" loops several lyrics of its original sample, "I Need Love" by rapper LL Cool J. In "Just the Way You Are XX", the sample is modified in order to become more mutant, while "A Perfect Moment" remakes the style of the English band Portishead. By "Take My Beef Away", sampling "Take My Breath Away" (June 1986) by Berlin, Kirby slows down the synth, making the chorus sound akin to a death wish.

== Release ==
Sick-Love was released in the year of 2000 by Kirby's self-operated label V/Vm Test. In a 2008 interview, Kirby said Sick-Love and his other work with pop under the V/Vm alias already explored memory; his later releases under the Caretaker alias would explore memory loss. The musician said most people dismissed Sick-Love as a joke when, according to him, it "was about recontextualisation and memory just as much as any Caretaker album was." The record is mostly unavailable physically because of copyright laws, which may be the reason as to why the most recent samples are the ones with most distortion.

== Reception ==
Professional ratings
Review scores
Source	Rating
AllMusic	4/5 stars
NME	4/5 stars

Sick-Love received generally positive reception from music critics, who praised its distortion of pop songs. AllMusic critic Tim DiGravina felt that, while it may be "first-class sonic thievery and manipulation," it would not be a record that listeners "would want to return to with great frequency." Paul Simpson of the same website argued that, for the public that has "a downright evil sense of humor, this is simply one of the best albums ever made." Writing for NME, Stephen Dalton called Sick-Love "a brutally disturbing treatise on pop and our love/hate relationship with it." The Igloo Magazine said the album was fantastic, along with V/Vm's albums of commemorative dates. However, Mark Weddle's more negative review for Brainwashed opined that the album "is fun and funny but the theme and gimmick get a bit old after awhile", and that The Green Door is more varied.

Sick-Love received airplay from several radio stations. This includes ABC, WPRB, WFMU, RTRFM, KFJC, and BBC Radio 1. The single "The Lady In Red (Is Dancing With Meat)" was later named by NME as single of the week. The song was also included in the Rewired program of The Wire.

== Track listing ==
Adapted from Brainwashed. Note and total length adapted from AllMusic. Samples adapted from Brainwashed, AllMusic, NME, and Freaky Trigger, as well as from the names of the songs themselves.

Sick-Love
No.	Title	Sample	Length
1.	"The Best Baby"	Kirby's voice and "Don't Be Lonely" (1986) by Cameo	1:51
2.	"Stay Anuvva Day"	"Stay Another Day" (December 1994) by East 17	4:25
3.	"The Lady in Red (Is Dancing With Meat)"	"The Lady in Red" (1986) by Chris de Burgh	4:09
4.	"I Need Lard"	"I Need Love" (July 1987) by LL Cool J	4:12
5.	"Goodiepal's _ _ _ _s (Edit)"	Original music and "I Keep Forgettin' (Every Time You're Near)" (August 1982) by Michael McDonald	0:56
6.	"Only You Ba Da Da Da"	"Only You" (December 1983) version by The Flying Pickets	3:18
7.	"Two Can Play That Gammon"	"Two Can Play That Game" (June 1994) by Bobby Brown	2:33
8.	"Just the Way You Are xx"	"Just the Way You Are" (September 1978) by Barry White	4:36
9.	"Say Nothing at All"	"When You Say Nothing at All" (August 1988) by Ronan Keating	3:35
10.	"Take My Beef Away"	"Take My Breath Away" (June 1986) by Berlin	4:06
11.	"Sex You Up"	"I Wanna Sex You Up" (March 1991) by Color Me Badd	0:50
12.	"Words......"	"Words" (October 1996) by Boyzone	4:01
13.	"The Other Side"	"The Other Side of the World" (March 1985) by Luther Vandross	3:27
14.	"For Evver and Evva"	"Forever and Ever (1973) by Demis Roussos	3:35
15.	"A Perfect Moment"	"Perfect Moment" (November 1997) by Martine McCutcheon	3:30
16.	"Blue Thighs (Baby's Got)"	"Blue Eyes (March 1982) by Elton John	3:47
17.	"Do You Want to Know a Sick-Rat?"	"Do You Want to Know a Secret" (March 1963) by The Beatles	2:06
18.	"Spud Girls Two Become 1"	"2 Become 1" (December 1996) by Spice Girls	3:53
19.	"Angels"	"Angels" (December 1997) by Robbie Williams	3:56
20.	"Mama Mia Tordis"	"Mamma Mia (September 1975) by ABBA	1:37
21.	"On My Own Why Did It End..."	"On My Own (March 1986) by Patti LaBelle and Michael McDonald	4:31
22.	"Untitled" (referred to as "Imagine")	"Imagine" (October 1971) by John Lennon	3:02
Total length:			71:56

The Green Door
No.	Title	Sample	Length
1.	"How Ya Gonna Keep 'em Down on the Farm?"	"How Ya Gonna Keep 'em Down on the Farm (After They've Seen Paree)?" (October 1973) by The Geoff Love Banjos	2:16
2.	"The Green Door Abduction"	"Green Door" (July 1981) by Shakin' Stevens	3:06
3.	"The Birdie Song"	"The Birdie Song (1982) by Bobby Crush	1:59
4.	"Schwarz-gelb Ist Borussia"	"Schwarz-Gelb Ist Borussia" (1997) by V/Vm With Hein O	3:38
5.	"Jim Bergerac"	"Bergerac Theme" (1981) by George Fenton	2:32
6.	"I'd Rather Jack Than Fleetwood Mac"	"I'd Rather Jack" (1988) by The Reynolds Girls	3:09
7.	"Lady in Red, Chris Has Gone"	"The Lady in Red" (1987) by Richard Clayderman	1:47
8.	"Careless*Trotter"	"Careless Whisper" (July 1984) by George Michael	3:41
9.	"BBC Snooker Theme"	"Drag Racer" (1988) by The Doug Wood Band	1:42
10.	"This Ole House"	"This Ole House (Rock & Roll Medley)" (1981) by Mini Pops	0:47
11.	"A Day Up North"	"Symphony #9 "New World" - Largo" (1893) by Antonín Dvořák	3:07
12.	"Rock Me (H)amadeus (Edgeley Edit)"	"Rock Me Amadeus" (1985) by Falco	4:14
13.	"All Night Long (Butcher All Night)"	"All Night Long (All Night)" (August 1983) by Lionel Richie	6:18
14.	"The Green Door"	"The Green Door (Novelty Medley)" (1981) by Mini Pops	0:58
15.	"He Ain't Heavy He's My Butcher"	"He Ain't Heavy, He's My Brother" (1969) by Bobby Scott and Bob Russell.	4:53
16.	"A-Team"	"The A-Team (From "The British Gas Advert")" (1984) by The Daniel Caine Orchestra	2:40
17.	"Mark*-That's Livin' Allright"	"That's Livin' Alright" (1997) by Pinky and Perky's Top Pop Party	3:11
18.	"Please Stop, I've Had Enough"	"Don't Stop 'Til You Get Enough" (July 1979) by Michael Jackson	4:11
19.	"I'm So In Love With You"	"Rock On Tommy (I'm So In Love With You)" (1980) by Cannon and Ball	3:20
20.	"Seven Days With Crab David"	"7 Days" (24 July 2000) by Craig David	3:59
21.	"Up Where We Belong"	"Up Where We Belong" (22 July 1982) by Joe Cocker and Jennifer Warnes	3:54
22.	"Pigs (You Are All)"	Original recording of pigs	6:37
23.	Untitled (referred to as "The Green Door Reprise")	"Green Door (Medley)" (1982) by Bobby Crush	1:19
Total length:			73:18
