= Persistent Repetition of Phrases =

Studio album by the Caretaker
- Released: 1 April 2008
- Genres: Ambient; big band; dark ambient; drone; electronic; experimental; hauntology; plunderphonics
- Length: 43:39
- Labels: Install; History Always Favours the Winners
- Producer: Leyland Kirby

The Caretaker chronology
Deleted Scenes, Forgotten Dreams (2007)	Persistent Repetition of Phrases (2008)	Recollected Memories from the Museum of Garden History (2008)

Audio sample
- "Persistent repetition of phrases": file; help

Persistent Repetition of Phrases (stylized as “Persistent repetition of phrases”) is the seventh studio album by the Caretaker, an alias of musician Leyland Kirby. Released on 1 April 2008, it was his first record to cover themes of Alzheimer's disease. The album was also the first Caretaker release to present looping of short segments within tracks. It marked Kirby's change of record labels from V/Vm Test to History Always Favours the Winners, which he felt might have helped with the record's success.

Persistent Repetition of Phrases has many track titles that reference memory disorders. The album began Kirby's history of using paintings by English painter Ivan Seal as album covers. A concept album, the record received a generally positive reception from music critics. The album's concepts would later influence Kirby on his next release as the Caretaker, An Empty Bliss Beyond This World.

== Background ==
The Caretaker was a musical project of English musician Leyland Kirby that sampled various big band records. Named after one of the characters from horror film The Shining, the haunted ballroom scene of the film was specified as his inspiration. His first albums had the film as a main influence. They are the "haunted ballroom trilogy," spanning Selected Memories from the Haunted Ballroom, A Stairway to the Stars, and We'll All Go Riding on a Rainbow. Selected Memories from the Haunted Ballroom had the most influence from the film, including the credits song "Midnight, the Stars and You". The Caretaker's albums were considered prime examples of hauntology, a genre that evokes the aesthetics of the past.

Kirby abandoned the ballroom and installed themes of memory loss on his 2005 release Theoretically Pure Anterograde Amnesia (2005). It was a drone album, featuring six CDs with 72 tracks titled "Memories". It was downloaded over 50,000 times on Kirby's V/Vm Test website. Persistent Repetition of Phrases had a great influence on Kirby's next album as the Caretaker, An Empty Bliss Beyond This World. An Empty Bliss was Kirby's first album to be based on a specific study about Alzheimer's disease.

== Composition ==
Persistent Repetition of Phrases consists of samples from 78-rpm records with vinyl crackle effects. It explores ambient, drone, hauntology, big band, electronic, experimental, and dark ambient. With its source material obscured, it is the first Caretaker record to revolve around the concept of Alzheimer's disease rather than amnesia, less abstract than Theoretically Pure Anterograde Amnesia. It uses looping to depict emotions related with recalling at an old age. It also features multiple layers of white noise, compared by several critics to the works of William Basinski and to Akira Rabelais' 2004 release Spellewauerynsherde. Its track titles reference various memory disorders, such as false memory syndrome. It is the Caretaker's first release to not be produced from a sample manipulated in real time. Instead, its tracks are composed from short segments of ballroom records. Like with other Caretaker albums, it is considered hauntological music.

The record opens with "Lacunar amnesia", where Kirby obscures the source material. This is to a certain point where the song turns into an earworm in the listener's consciousness. It references the disorder of the same name, whereby the brain loses the memory of a specific event. The following song, "Rosy retrospection" is named in reference to the phenomenon of the same name, whereby people judge the past as more positive than the present in a disproportionate amount. "Poor enunciation" presents a dark ambient style with a choir. "Von Restorff effect" is named after the effect of the same name, which indicates objects that stand out from other objects are more prone to being remembered better. This results in the other objects not being recalled well. "Past life regression" also references the disorder of the same name, whereby hypnosis is used to bring memories of what seems to be a past life. The record ends with "Unmasking alzhiemer's", the only track to have a direct reference to Alzheimer's disease.

== Release and artwork ==
The Caretaker released Persistent Repetition of Phrases on 1 April 2008. Contrary to previous albums, which came on the V/Vm Test record label, it came on History Always Favours the Winners, though was originally released on the Install label. Kirby mentioned he was in a sad period of his life at the time, as his health was in a bad state. He did not release the record for six months, but rather left it in a hard drive "gathering digital dust." This was until two workers of the label "immediately wanted to put it out." Its success impressed the musician; he believed not being released on V/Vm Test might have helped with its success. Kirby later re-issued Persistent Repetition of Phrases on vinyl in 2011 after its original release. He responded: "It’s something I have thought about as people often ask me. I just need to work out what and when."

Persistent Repetition of Phrases was the first Caretaker record to use artwork by Ivan Seal. Its vinyl edition featured a painting by him. Seal had also previously worked as a sound artist. According to Kirby, Seal is a friend of his since the 1990s, when he recorded as V/Vm. The musician described his paintings at the time as "incredible, almost timeless, playing with spaces and objects." Kirby felt they were "perfect" at depicting his work, and that he's "very flattered" towards Seal allowing him to use his paintings. He added that Seal's sound art is "amazing," citing an exhibition of his at Berlin as an example. He concluded, "maybe at some point we can work together on something. Let’s hope so." The physical packaging of the vinyl includes no liner notes, presenting only a painting by Ivan Seal. The cover art is minimalistic, depicting a blank canvas. Later editions of the album feature a different painting by Seal depicting a paint roller standing upright.

== Reception ==
Professional ratings
Review scores
Source	Rating
Fact	8.5/10
OndaRock	7.5/10

Persistent Repetition of Phrases was met with a generally positive reception from music critics. According to Kirby, it was a success. Writing for Tiny Mix Tapes, critic Joe Davenport felt many listeners saw the record as "his masterpiece." James Knapman from Igloo Magazine described the record as a very peculiar experience, due to its combination of nostalgia with psychological horror creating "a ghostly library of vintage memories and fictions that are quite simply without par." Magazine Fact, who gave the highest rating of the album, stated that the Caretaker is "a past master at the technique of exquisitely drawing out and distending the ache – of nostalgia, heartbreak, longing – already glowing like gaslight in these old songs." Cyclic Defrost critic Shaun Prescott felt the record was one of Kirby's most acclaimed releases and his most acclaimed of 2008, while still not being released in his own label. The Wire included Persistent Repetition of Phrases as an "office ambiance" record, specifying the track "Lacunar amnesia". Critic Matthew Solarski from Pitchfork named it the 17th best album of 2008, as well as The Wire included it in a listing of the best releases of the year.

== Track listing ==
Adapted from Bandcamp.

Persistent Repetition of Phrases track listing
No.	Title	Length
1.	"Lacunar Amnesia"	3:29
2.	"Persistent Repetition of Phrases"	6:17
3.	"Rosy Retrospection"	5:09
4.	"Long Term (Remote)"	4:19
5.	"Poor Enunciation"	5:04
6.	"Past Life Regression"	4:34
7.	"False Memory Syndrome"	3:54
8.	"Von Restorff Effect"	5:33
9.	"Unmasking Alzhiemer's [sic]"	5:24
Total length:		43:48

== Personnel ==
Adapted from Brainwashed.

- The Caretaker – "recording and remembering" of the audio
- Leyland Kirby – mastering
- Ivan Seal – album cover
