= The Japanese Sandman =

Song by Paul Whiteman and His Ambassador Orchestra
- B-side: "Whispering"
- Released: September 1920
- Recorded: August 19, 1920
- Studio: Victor Studios, Camden, New Jersey, U.S.
- Genre: Jazz, Big band
- Label: Victor 18690
- Composer: Richard A. Whiting
- Lyricist: Raymond B. Egan

Paul Whiteman and His Ambassador Orchestra singles chronology
| "The Japanese Sandman" (1920) | "Wang Wang Blues" (1920) |
- An instrumental version of "The Japanese Sandman", being performed by Paul Whiteman and His Ambassador Orchestra in August 1920.

"The Japanese Sandman" is a song from 1920, composed by Richard A. Whiting and with lyrics by Raymond B. Egan. The song was first popularized in vaudeville by Nora Bayes, and then sold millions of copies as the B-side for Paul Whiteman's song "Whispering".

== Content ==
"The Japanese Sandman", being performed by Nora Bayes and the Charles A. Prince Orchestra in 1920.

An instrumental rendition of "The Japanese Sandman", being performed on a synthesized piano.

1920s piano roll of "The Japanese Sandman" as played by the pianist John Milton Delcamp.

Olive Kline performing "The Japanese Sandman" in 1920, with Josef Pasternack conducting.

"The Japanese Sandman" played by Harry Raderman's Novelty Orchestra c. 1920.

"The Japanese Sandman" played by Isham Jones' Rainbo Orchestra in 1920.

Apart from the original instrumental version, there are songs of the same name, and at a minimum, two entirely different lyrical arrangements, and musical arrangements that in turn give very different impressions, so are distinct from each other. For example, the version by Willard Robison Deep River Orchestra, with vocals by Annette Hanshaw, with the lyrics about a sandman from Japan, who exchanges yesterdays for tomorrows. By doing so he "takes every sorrow of the day that is through" and "he'll bring you tomorrow, just to start a life anew." The number has an Oriental atmosphere, and is similar to many other songs from the interwar period that sing about a dreamy, exotic setting. Whereas in a version by The Cellos there are East Asian tropes of pronunciation "you lookie like a Japanese Sandman", and the use phrases such as "I wear a pinstripe jacket made of chunky foo yang/ Polka dot shoes made of yang sang"

Nora Bayes made a popular recording of the song in 1920. In the same year, the song was released as the B-side of Paul Whiteman's first record, "Whispering.” It has been subsequently performed by several musical artists like Art Hickman, Benny Goodman, Bix Beiderbecke, Artie Shaw, Earl Hines, Paul Young, Django Reinhardt, the Andrews Sisters, Freddy Gardner, and in 2010, a high-fidelity recording of Whiteman's historic arrangement, by Vince Giordano and his Nighthawks Orchestra.

Additionally, the song was recorded by the Nazi German propaganda band, Charlie and his Orchestra. For propaganda reasons, the lyrics were changed through references to the Japanese Empire.

== In popular culture ==
- A version of the song was often used in North American cartoons in the 1940s, such as 1942's The Ducktators, usually to mock Japanese characters, due to the attack upon the U.S. by Japan.
- An orchestral version is heard in the musical film Rose of Washington Square (1939), starring Alice Faye.
- In the 1947 Disney cartoon "Cat Nap Pluto," both Pluto and Figaro are visited by figurative "sandman" likenesses of themselves in coolie hats, seeking to bring on sleep. These references are purely visual, however, as the Whiting song is not heard.
- The Japanese-American boxer, Shoji "Harold" Hoshino, was nicknamed "The Japanese Sandman" in the 1930s.
- In 1944 a version of the song plays out the submarine's speaker system to the crew in Destination Tokyo.
- Hoagy Carmichael performed the song on ukulele in the 1952 film, Belles on Their Toes.
- A version of the song appears towards the end of the overture to the 1967 film Thoroughly Modern Millie, despite not appearing anywhere else in the theatrical release.
- Whiteman's original can also be heard in the 1969 film, They Shoot Horses, Don't They? and on The Masked Marauders album from the same year.
- A version was featured in the 1999 Martin Scorsese film Bringing Out the Dead.
- A version also appears in the 2009 fantasy film The Imaginarium of Doctor Parnassus.
- Instrumental covers performed by Vince Giordano and his Nighthawks Orchestra appeared in almost every one of the first five episodes of the HBO series Boardwalk Empire; a version with lyrics was featured in an episode aired on October 24, 2010.
- The Caretaker sampled the song for his track "The Weeping Dancefloor" in We'll All Go Riding on a Rainbow.

== The Cellos version ==
In 1957, the American doo-wop band The Cellos recorded "Rang Tang Ding Dong (I Am the Japanese Sandman)", which features the same character, but with different lyrics. Frank Zappa quoted from The Cellos' lyrics in his song "A Little Green Rosetta", from Joe's Garage (1979).

== See also ==
- "Afghanistan", contemporaneous song with a similar premise
