= You and the Night and the Music =

Song
- Published: 1934 by Harms Incorporated
- Genre: Jazz standard
- Songwriters: Composer: Arthur Schwartz; Lyricist: Howard Dietz

"You and the Night and the Music" is a popular song composed by Arthur Schwartz with lyrics by Howard Dietz.

The song was debuted in the Broadway show Revenge with Music. The show originally opened on November 28, 1934, ran for 22 performances, after which it closed temporarily on December 15, reopening on December 24 and running for an additional 135 performances. Authors Caryl Brahms and Ned Sherrin, in their book Song by Song: 14 Great Lyric Writers, say that “...the musical yielded two enduring hits and a profit although it was an artistic failure.”

== Notable recordings ==
Popular recordings in 1935 were by Libby Holman and by Leo Reisman (vocal by Phil Dewey). The song has since become an enduring jazz standard with notable recordings by Frank Sinatra, Bill Evans, Chet Baker, Stan Getz, Keith Jarrett, Julie London, Jamie Cullum, Baby Washington and Lennie Niehaus.

The song was sampled on The Caretaker’s 1999 album Selected Memories from the Haunted Ballroom as part of the track “You and the Night”.

== See also ==
- List of 1930s jazz standards
