= Watermelon in Easter Hay =

Song by Frank Zappa

from the album Joe's Garage Acts II & III
- Released: November 19, 1979
- Recorded: Village Recorders, LA; Spring 1979
- Genre: Instrumental rock, hard rock, progressive rock
- Length: 9:08
- Label: Zappa Records
- Songwriter: Frank Zappa
- Producer: Frank Zappa

"Watermelon in Easter Hay", full name "Playing a Guitar Solo With This Band is Like Trying To Grow a Watermelon in Easter Hay", is the penultimate song on Frank Zappa's 1979 concept album Joe's Garage. The main character from this three-part rock opera is faced with the banning of all music by the dystopian society into which he is released after having been repeatedly raped in prison, and copes by imagining guitar solos in his head for the entire third act of the album. As he "begins to feel depressed now, he knows the end is near", this song acts as the character's final goodbye to music as he moves on with his life, detailed in "A Little Green Rosetta", the next and final song of the album.

The song is introduced by opening narration by Zappa as the Central Scrutinizer, which then gives way to a guitar solo. This guitar solo is the only guitar solo specifically recorded for the album, as every other guitar solo was xenochronous—overdubbed from older live recordings.

== Reception and legacy ==
In their review of the album, Down Beat magazine criticized the song, but subsequent reviewers have championed the song as Zappa's masterpiece. Kelly Fisher Lowe called it the "crowning achievement of the album" and "one of the most gorgeous pieces of music ever produced". Zappa told Neil Slaven that he thought it was "the best song on the album". The song's title is thought to have come from a saying used by Zappa while recording the album: "Playing a guitar solo with this band is like trying to grow a watermelon in Easter hay". After Zappa died, "Watermelon in Easter Hay" became known as one of his signature songs, and his son Dweezil Zappa later referred to it as "the best solo Zappa ever played".

== Personnel ==
- Frank Zappa – lead guitar
- Warren Cuccurullo – rhythm guitar
- Denny Walley – slide guitar
- Peter Wolf – keyboards
- Tommy Mars – keyboards
- Arthur Barrow – bass
- Ed Mann – percussion
- Vinnie Colaiuta – drums

== In popular culture ==
=== Film ===
- "Watermelon in Easter Hay" was the ending credit song in Alfonso Cuarón's 2001 road film Y Tu Mamá También.
- "Watermelon in Easter Hay" was used in Deathwish Skateboards full length video "UNCROSSED" as the featured track during skateboarder Jamie Foy's skate part in the film.

=== Television ===
- "Watermelon in Easter Hay" can be heard during the 7th episode of the first season of American Hostage, beginning at 18m07s. At 18m16s, Barbara Heckman shouts, "RITCHIE, TURN IT DOWN!". American Hostage is set in 1977, but Joe's Garage was released in 1979.
