= St Luke Passion, BWV 246 =

Musical composition

The St Luke Passion (German: Lukas-Passion), BWV 246, is a Passion setting formerly attributed to Johann Sebastian Bach. It is included in the BWV catalog under the number 246. Now it appears in the catalogues under the heading apocryphal or anonymous.

== History ==
A surviving manuscript of the St Luke Passion from about 1730 is partly in Bach's hand, though scholars believe that the music is certainly not his own. The music was later thought to have been composed by Johann Melchior Molter, but that was proven false because if Molter composed the music, then the manuscript would date to later than 1730. Presumably Bach performed it, or intended to perform it, in Leipzig. C. P. E. Bach and Agricola may have mistaken it for a work of Bach's and thus included it in their census. Of course, given his delight in exhaustive cycles, Bach should have composed a St Luke Passion. Apparently J. S. Bach took the anonymous St Luke Passion and arranged it for four voices, chorus, orchestra, and continuo to meet an urgent deadline for Good Friday in 1730.

== Authenticity ==
With regard to the authorship of the passion, Felix Mendelssohn commented in a letter to Franz Hauser who had just paid a large sum of money to purchase the Lukaspassion: "I am sorry to hear you have given so much money for the St. Luke Passion." Mendelssohn repudiated Bach's authorship of the work upon the evidence of a single chorale, 'Weide mich und mach' mich satt' (No. 9). He continued:

"No doubt, as an authentic autograph, it would be worth the price. But it is not by Bach. You ask, 'On what grounds do you maintain your opinion?' I answer, on intrinsic evidence, though it is unpleasant to say so, since it is your property. But just look at the chorale, 'Weide mich und mach' mich satt'! If that is by Sebastian, may I be hanged! It certainly is in his handwriting, but it is too clean. Evidently he copied it. 'Whose is it?' you ask; 'Telemann, or M. Bach, or Altnichol?' Jung Nichol or plain Nichol, how can I tell? It's not by Bach. Probably it is of North German origin." (Terry, 78).

== In popular culture ==
Starting in 1999, an English performance of the aria "Lasst mich ihn nur noch einmal küssen" ('Just let me kiss him one more time') from the St. Luke Passion was used by musician Leyland James Kirby, also known as The Caretaker, as the track "Friends Past Reunited" on several of his albums. Specifically, he included the track on his first album, Selected Memories from the Haunted Ballroom (1999) and A Stairway to the Stars (2001). He also used the same performance recording as the ending to the final track of Stage 6, "Place in the World fades away", the finale to his final project, Everywhere at the End of Time (2016–2019). The group that produced the exact performance remains unknown.

== Recordings ==
- 1963 – Christiane Sorell (soprano), Maura Moreira (contralto), Kurt Equiluz (tenor), Franz Wimmer (bass) – Wiener Akademie Kammerchor, Orchester der Wiener Staatsoper, conducted by George Barati – 3 LPs LL 110 Lyrichord.
- 1971 – Charlotte Lehmann (soprano), Gudrun Schmid (soprano), Elisabeth Künstler (contralto), Georg Jelden (tenor), Graeme Nicolson (tenor), Ulrich Schaible (bass), Wolfgang Herrlitz (bass) – Balinger Kantorei, Kammerorchester des Collegium Musicum Tübingen, conducted by Gerhard Rehm – 3 LPs SM 30 013/14/15 Corona, reissued on 2 CDs by Brilliant Classics.
- 1997 – Mona Spägele (soprano), Christiane Iven (soprano), Rufus Müller (tenor), Harry van Berne (tenor), Markus Sandmann (tenor), Stephan Schreckenberger (bass) – Alsfelder Vokalensemble, Barockorchester Bremen, conducted by Wolfgang Helbich – 2 CDs 999 293-2 CPO.
