= Lacunar amnesia =

Amnesia for specific events

- Specialty: Psychology

Lacunar amnesia is the loss of memory about a specific event. This specific form of amnesia is caused by brain damage in the limbic system which is responsible for our memories and emotions. When the damage occurs it leaves a lacuna, or a gap, in the record of memory within the cortex region of the brain. There is a general belief that certain emotions from the lost memory may be triggered without the recollection of the event.

== Characteristics ==
Daniel Goleman, in his book Vital Lies, Simple Truths, defines a lacuna as:

"...the sort of mental apparatus that diversionary schemas represent. A lacuna is, then, the attentional mechanism that creates a defensive gap in awareness. Lacunas, in short, create blind spots."

Lacunar amnesia has also been known to be attributed to alcoholism, drug treatment, and withdrawal in some cases. After using these substances a person may experience a loss of memory of a specific event temporarily or even permanently.

Steven Johnson, (the author of Mind Wide Open: Your Brain and the Neuroscience of Everyday Life) also states that:

"Scientists believe memories are captured and stored by two separate parts of the brain, the hippocampus, the normal seat of memory, and the amygdala, one of the brain's emotional centers. People who, due to hippocampus damage, are incapable of forming long-term memories can still form subconscious memories of traumatic events if their amygdala is intact."This may be related to erasure or reconsolidation of memories. Attempts have been made to remember memories that have been consolidated and reconsolidate them under desired conditions.

According to Alex Chadwick speaking on NPR:

"Some scientists now believe that memories effectively get rewritten every time they're activated. Studies on rats suggest that if you block a crucial chemical process during the execution of a learned behavior - pushing a lever to get food, for instance - the learned behavior disappears. The rat stops remembering. Theoretically, if you could block that chemical reaction in a human brain while triggering a specific memory, you could make a targeted erasure. Think of a dreadful fight with your girlfriend while blocking that chemical reaction, and zap! The memory's gone."

This idea of the reconsolidation of memories has also been used in cases of PTSD to lessen or alleviate some of the symptoms associated with the illness.

== Criminal cases ==
This condition is often claimed in the instance of criminal cases. The victim or assailant will insist that they have lost their memory about the event in question, but the remainder of their memory, both anterograde and retrograde, remain intact. There is only one specific memory or recollection of an event that is impaired. This is normally paired or in conjunction with the claim of insanity.

== In popular culture ==
This type of amnesia is used as a plot element in movies such as Eternal Sunshine of the Spotless Mind and Memento, & Heroes, a Vietnam War veteran named Jack Dunne seeks out a friend from the war, which he knew had been killed, but had completely blocked out until his father triggers the memory. Both of the amnesiac conditions in these movies represent gaps in the memory instead of long-term or short-term loss. The Caretaker's 2008 album Persistent Repetition of Phrases has the name "Lacunar amnesia" as the title of its opening track.
