= Sadly, the Future Is No Longer What It Was =

Studio album by Leyland Kirby
- Released: 1 September 2009
- Recorded: December 2008–March 2009
- Studio: Berlin, Germany
- Genre: Ambient; drone; electronic; hauntology; post-rock
- Length: 233:34
- Label: History Always Favours the Winners

Leyland Kirby chronology
Sadly, the Future Is No Longer What It Was (2009)	Intrigue & Stuff (2011)

Sadly, the Future Is No Longer What It Was is the debut studio album by English musician Leyland Kirby, released on 1 September 2009. With his ongoing aliases at the time, Kirby produced a melancholic album that explored thoughts of the future. He produced Sadly at an agitated time, when he would not work but rather drink with various girls. The record was first issued as three full-length CDs and would later be repressed as six LPs with artwork by Ivan Seal. The release received moderately positive reception from music critics. Some criticized its length, while others praised its emotional sound.

== Background ==
Leyland Kirby is an English musician best known for his ambient drone releases as the Caretaker. He was very prolific with his numerous pseudonyms, saying: "There is only the work, regardless of external pressures and the day to day struggle." His releases under the Caretaker alias explored the horror film The Shining but would later portray memory loss with Theoretically Pure Anterograde Amnesia (2005). According to Rory Gibb of The Quietus, Sadly, the Future Is No Longer What It Was 'reimagined' Kirby's music and gave him the title of "Frustrated future thinker." As the debut album of Kirby under his own name, it shows a more emotional and personal sound than his other aliases while maintaining the trend of his hauntological work as the Caretaker.

== Composition ==
Sadly, the Future Is No Longer What It Was is a romantic melancholic album, exploring ambient, electronic, rock, hauntology, and drone. The album is divided into three discs that present elements such as keyboards through a hissing sound. Its main features and instruments are piano-related, with a large portion of the compositions being built from incomplex melodies and notes. The record's track titles manifest its melancholic feel, with names such as "When We Parted, My Heart Wanted to Die", "Tonight is the Last Night of the World", and "I've Hummed This Tune to All the Girls I've Known". The length of the tracks can reach 20 minutes, some of which highlight white noise and reverberation effects. They also have various futuristic textures and sound effects influenced by electronica. Featuring a mourning and somber style, Sadly drew several comparisons to the works of American composer Harold Budd, to the first ambient releases of English musician Brian Eno, and to American avant-gardist William Basinski. The record also drew some comparisons to deceased French pianist Erik Satie.

According to the press release, the album's title "alludes to a once-promised yet undelivered future cast aside in favor of harnessing intellect and technology for the furtherance of social networking and internet memes." Author Mark Fisher felt the title 'perfectly' encapsulates "the sense of yearning for a future that we feel cheated out of". Before the album's release, Fisher interpreted the Caretaker's music as "the failure of the future". The three CDs—When We Parted My Heart Wanted to Die, Sadly, the Future Is No Longer What It Was, and Memories Live Longer Than Dreams—present the same general sound, indicating the record's intention is to be listened to in parts rather than as a whole. The release mostly features a sadness feel, as well as a sound more reminiscent of Kirby's own music rather than the music of others. Its emotional parts are broader than Kirby's music as the Caretaker, with a fog sound effect rendering the music as such. As its title suggests, Sadly, the Future Is No Longer What It Was represents mourning for the loss of the future. The album's length suggests the challenge of listening to the entirety of the album at once.

== Recording, release, and artwork ==
"A lot of work has gone into [Sadly, the Future Is No Longer What It Was]. It's the beginning of a new phase of work now – something a lot more personal than before, more delicate and emotional. [...] It was also born from a time of personal change...it became part of my own rebuilding process."

— Leyland Kirby

Sadly, the Future Is No Longer What It Was was recorded in Berlin from December 2008 to March 2009, which was winter. Sadly's recording process was at a very agitated time in Kirby's life; whenever the agitation stopped, he would go back to recording the album. He would drink and be with various girls, which according to him, made Sadly "quite interesting" for being released at this time. He added: "It was an incredibly fun time, but the work was very difficult, and emotionally I probably wasn't the best." Noting comparisons of the album with the work of Eno, Kirby said "it's kind of lazy to say anything which has a certain kind of ambience is related to Brian Eno..." He felt his new work under his own name is "in the middle ground" between his work as the Caretaker and the Stranger. In another interview, he continued stating the difference between V/Vm and the albums under his own name: "Sometimes it's good to flip things around 180 degrees, and say 'Instead of smashing something apart, I'm going to make something much more beautiful now'."

Sadly, the Future Is No Longer What It Was was released on 1 September 2009. It was first issued as three CDs in 2009 but would later be reissued on six LP in 2010, featuring artwork by Ivan Seal. Kirby initially intended for it to be a single CD, which would make the album be very different than what it is now. He described Sadly as "the soundtrack to a world in decline, the heroism of modern life, a document of loss, an essay in gloom".

== Critical reception ==
Professional ratings
Review scores
Source	Rating
AllMusic	3.5/5 stars
OndaRock	8/10
Pitchfork	6.8/10
Resident Advisor	4.5/5
Tiny Mix Tapes	4.5/5 stars

Sadly, the Future Is No Longer What It Was received moderately positive reception from music critics. Some criticized its length, while others praised its emotional sound.

AllMusic writer Phil Freeman cited the album's length as "artistic failure." Mike Powell of Pitchfork called Kirby's approach to the album "still extreme", noticing its "three discs, four hours, [and] little variation". The Line of Best Fit's Matt Poacher argued that, with the record, "one wonders what it is that Kirby truly mourns and whether the whole enterprise is founded on some abstract notion of grief."

Chris Mann of Resident Advisor said Sadly "is rich in ideas and textures," adding it is "one of the most haunting albums you'll hear all year." Joe Davenport of Tiny Mix Tapes echoed a similar sentiment, calling the album 'brilliant'. Davenport explained that criticizing the "6 fucking LPs" length "would demonstrate a disregard for Kirby's intent, which is political in nature." BBC Music's Louis Pattison further pinpointed Sadly's melancholy as "sham[ing] many other examples of the form". Writer for NPR, Meaghan Garvey said the title Sadly, the Future Is No Longer What It Was encapsulates feelings relating to the death of author Mark Fisher. The Quietus' Frances Morgan concluded that "a large-scale piece is in itself a statement of intent in our supposedly accelerated listening culture, upon which Kirby takes a dystopian, regretful stance."

Sadly ranked 26th on a listing by the Australian Broadcasting Corporation of the best releases of 2009. It also ranked 39th on a listing of same style done by Tiny Mix Tapes. Magazine Fact placed Sadly on 9th in its ranking of the best albums from 2009's third quarter. French electronic musician Jean-Jacques Perrey, who was labeled as "the godfather of techno", mentioned the album title while explaining how "the world moves so much faster."

Fact said Sadly perfected Kirby's "moody Lynchian mode". His next albums would further explore this idea, including Intrigue & Stuff and We Drink to Forget the Coming Storm. The magazine argued that "the future certainly seem[ed] to be brightening for James Leyland Kirby." In his interview with Kirby, Resident Advisor's Todd L. Burns called Sadly "one of the most beautiful works of his career".

== Track listing ==
Adapted from Bandcamp. All tracks are written by Leyland Kirby.

Disc 1 - When We Parted, My Heart Wanted to Die
No.	Title	Length
1.	"When We Parted, My Heart Wanted to Die"	15:00
2.	"The Sound of Music Vanishing"	11:09
3.	"The Beauty of the Impending Tragedy of My Existence"	7:30
4.	"And as I Sat Beside You, I Felt the Great Sadness That Day"	12:46
5.	"Tonight Is the Last Night of the World"	9:25
6.	"To the Place Between the Twilight and the Dawn"	20:15
Total length:		76:38

Disc 2 - Sadly, the Future Is No Longer What It Was
No.	Title	Length
1.	"When Did Our Dreams and Futures Drift So Far Apart?"	9:47
2.	"Not Even Nostalgia Is as Good as It Used to Be"	9:35
3.	"Sadly, the Future Is No Longer What It Was"	20:21
4.	"Stay Light, There Is a Rainbow Coming"	12:11
5.	"And Nothing Comes Between the Sadness and the Scream"	6:55
6.	"I Hummed This Tune to All the Girls I've Known"	12:42
7.	"Not As She Is Now, But As She Appears in My Dreams"	6:55
Total length:		76:58

Disc 3 - Memories Live Longer than Dreams
No.	Title	Length
1.	"Memories Live Longer than Dreams"	8:34
2.	"Don't Sleep, I Am Not What I Seem, I'm a Very Quiet Storm"	13:14
3.	"A Longing to Be Absorbed for a While Into a Different and Beautiful World"	13:16
4.	"Days in the Wilderness"	4:14
5.	"Stralauer Peninsular"	16:53
6.	"We All Won That Day, Sunshine"	12:42
7.	"And at Dawn Armed with Glowing Patience, We Will Enter the Cities of Glory"	10:46
Total length:		79:58
