= Eager to Tear Apart the Stars =

- Ivan Seal, Analyst Couch (Note: Stylised in all lowercase.) (2010), oil on canvas

Studio album by Leyland Kirby
- Released: 3 October 2011
- Genres: Ambient; electronic
- Length: 42:46
- Label: History Always Favours the Winners

Leyland Kirby chronology
Intrigue & Stuff (2011)	Eager to Tear Apart the Stars (2011)	Breaks My Heart Each Time (2014)

Eager to Tear Apart the Stars is the second studio album by English electronic musician Leyland Kirby, released on 3 October 2011. Following his own name debut album 'Sadly, the Future Is No Longer What It Was', Kirby continued exploring a more personal side of his music, though one that differs from his work as 'The Caretaker'. Kirby produced the songs without using any samples, mostly creating piano tracks from synthesisers. This style of sound drew comparisons to the work of composers Harold Budd and Roedelius, though the record's press release claimed Kirby has his own oeuvre.

Characterised by a melancholic tone and piano-reliant tracks, Eager to Tear Apart the Stars departs from the longer and more inaccessible Sadly, but is still similar to that album in its emotions. The length of the songs, which present a concept related to time, range from one to 10 minutes; although not related to the Caretaker's exploration of memory loss, some critics interpreted Eager's track titles as describing such. After a year of no music, Kirby released the album as a portion of what some reviewers felt was the occupied year of 2011 for him. Following its release, the artwork by painter Ivan Seal was compared to the Caretaker's An Empty Bliss Beyond This World.

The album is positively regarded by music critics, with a number of them finding its melancholia "beautiful". Eager to Tear Apart the Stars was considered Kirby's opportunity of being in a group of "music demigods", including William Basinski and Tim Hecker.

== Background ==
After the release of his debut album Sadly, the Future Is No Longer What It Was (2009), English electronic musician Leyland Kirby "needed time to rest". Sadly represented Kirby's dissatisfaction with the public's perception of the future, which Rory Gibb of The Quietus wrote about as Kirby's "lament for the death of flying-car futurism". Unlike his work as the Caretaker, which explores memory loss, the Leyland Kirby alias represents a more personal project, with piano tracks dominating the releases.

== Music and production ==
The songs, described by Kirby as "clear-headed and sombre," are presented with what Joseph Burnett of The Quietus described as "a deliberately overwrought approach". The compositions feature a style that many reviewers interpreted as melancholic, with Kirby's press release claiming it is a concept album about time. The Quietus suggested that, as Kirby's follow-up to Sadly, Eager is "as beautiful as you'd expect from a Kirby album". The album is characterised as ambient and electronic, with music reviewers also citing sound collages and rock as dominant in some tracks.

The synth style of the record was compared by Kirby's press release to the music of composers Roedelius and Harold Budd, though Eager has "a temporal warping and sense of decayed decadence individual to Kirby's oeuvre." Kirby said he feels "cheated" when listening to the releases of other musicians, since "it can sound too perfect and calculated." One producer likened to Eager is Fennesz; writer Mike Powell suggested for Pitchfork that the album Endless Summer (2001) also evokes a feeling of time passing. Compared to Sadly, Eager is much shorter—with a length of 40 minutes rather than three hours—and was described by Kirby as more accessible.

Kirby produced Eager to Tear Apart the Stars in Berlin; the songs "start from no sounds whatsoever and [then] everything's built up"; unlike his work as the Caretaker, the Leyland Kirby alias does not use samples.

The opening track, "The Arrow of Time", sets the melancholic tone of the record, with AllMusic contributor Ned Raggett interpreting it as Kirby's continued exploration of Sadly's emotions. "This Is the Story of Paradise Lost" expands on this theme, although Raggett felt that it contrasts with the opener due to its "more soothing impact". The one-minute long song "To Reject the World" is followed by "No Longer Distance than Death", where a noise-like choral is featured. The static style of "They Are All Dead, There Are No Skip at All" drew comparison to bands Disco Inferno and the Avalanches, with Burnett calling it "a synthetic miasma locked somewhere between the Blade Runner soundtrack and Music for Airports." Unlike the synth style found on most of the album's tracks, "My Dream Contained a Star" presents a mournful piano, concluding Eager with violins.

== Release and artwork ==
Eager to Tear Apart the Stars was released on 3 October 2011. The Self-Titled Magazine noted that the release of Eager meant that "Kirby ha[d] suddenly emerged from hiding"; Rory Gibb of The Quietus claimed that the album was a part of Kirby's "characteristically busy 2011", to which Kirby responded that, in 2010, he "needed time to rest [after Sadly]." Kirby continued with the statement that he "was still working very hard all year on music," and "thought it'd be nice to put something out which isn't as grand as [Sadly]." Like Sadly, Eager to Tear Apart the Stars represents a more personal side of Kirby's music, but it is also "a lot more accessible, because it's short." Describing Eager to Tear Apart the Stars, Kirby's press release noted that "There's an ostensible sadness to these six pieces, but of a life-affirming and subtly ambiguous kind."

The cover art for Eager to Tear Apart the Stars is an oil painting by Kirby's long-time friend Ivan Seal. Titled Analyst Couch (2010), it features a dramatically widened hand watch. Knapman interpreted the work as "a companion piece" to An Empty Bliss Beyond This World, which presents a boulder, possibly a ball of clay, with a match stuck in it.

== Critical reception ==
Professional ratings
Review scores
Source	Rating
AllMusic	4/5 stars
Eesti Ekspress	9/10
Nöjesguiden	(Note: Before the album's title, there is a happy face. The file for that face is titled "rating-5.svg".)
OndaRock	7/10
Pitchfork	7.9/10
Porcys	6.5/10

Eager to Tear Apart the Stars has been praised by music reviewers for the emotions it presents. AllMusic contributor Ned Raggett expressed positivity with the record's "cryptic, sometimes darkly evocative sonics". He found that "Kirby is happily interested in continuing the exploration of instrumental moods previously demonstrated on the three-disc Sadly, the Future Is No Longer What It Was". Mike Powell, a Pitchfork writer, considered Eager a "drift, float, shrug" record, while Burnett regarded the album as "that place where melancholia is all-enveloping and overwhelming". For Igloo Magazine, James Knapman described Eager to Tear Apart the Stars as an "essential release", and argued that "To pass on this [...] would be a serious error." The critic followed this up by saying the record's compositions are "heart-stopping", calling a listener's experience with them as "transcend[ing] the mood". In Knapman's opinion, it is "desperately melancholy" and "an obvious sequel" to Sadly, the Future Is No Longer What It Was.

The compositions found on Eager to Tear Apart the Stars were described by several critics as melancholic, though some reviewers felt nothing of the track titles. Tyler Parks of Treblezine described the names as not "contain[ing] the music that they designate," although The Quietus felt that they are "again concerned with time and memory", with Burnett saying the record "would (and has) quickly become maudlin." Mike Reid of Tiny Mix Tapes was positive of Eager, considering it Kirby's "palpable opportunity to secure his place alongside comparable musical demigods like Tim Hecker, William Basinski, or Stars of the Lid"; he described the sound of the album as "just as beautifully affecting as [Sadly]." In general, the record received comments ranging from "a hard sell [that is] rather magnificent" to "Romantic, sentimental, [and] faintly melancholy".

Eager to Tear Apart the Stars received airplay from the WMFU radio station, featuring "This Is the Story of Paradise Lost" and "No Longer Distance than Death". Attaining coverage from foreign publications, the record's first two tracks also received airplay from ABC.

== Track listing ==
Adapted from Bandcamp.

Eager to Tear Apart the Stars track listing
No.	Title	Length
1.	"The Arrow of Time"	3:12
2.	"This Is the Story of Paradise Lost"	9:43
3.	"To Reject the World"	1:27
4.	"No Longer Distance than Death"	7:53
5.	"They Are All Dead, There Are No Skip at All"	10:25
6.	"My Dream Contained a Star"	10:03
Total length:		42:46

== Personnel ==
Adapted from Brainwashed.

- Leyland Kirby – producer
- Ivan Seal – artwork
- "Lupo" – mastering
