= Diskono =

Diskono is an independent record label comprising anonymous artists from Scotland north of the Antonine Wall. Continuing multidisciplinary art practices in non-disclosed Scottish locations, they are also rumored to operate out of Belgium, France, and United States of America. Diskono, and its offshoot imprint Penthouse Hotplate nurtured divergent forms of location recordings and sound art to minimal techno, sparse piano compositions to abstract explosive noise and angular punk pop. Known for the discovery of artists such as Felix Kubin, Janek Schaefer, and many more, they were also instrumental in the deconstruction of Detroit techno classics with releases such as V/Vm 'String Up Your Wife', as well as being involved in many controversial art world and performance based situations across the British Isles and Europe in the late 90's- early 2000s. Diskono were also the first and only Scottish artists to be awarded a major Scottish Arts Council grant from submission under pseudonym with the resulting exhibition, Revisionland with Alejandra and Aeron going on to win the 2002 Prix Ars Electronica award in Linz, Austria. Currently, Diskono are observing the reemergence of artist, Jan Van Den Dobbelsteen.
