= Jan van den Dobbelsteen =

Dutch artist

Jan van den Dobbelsteen (born 28 September 1954, Waalre) is an interdisciplinary Dutch artist who teaches at Academy St. Joost in Breda and lives and works in Eindhoven.

Biography: "He has been working with sound and sound installations for more than 25 years. He is interested in the fundamental structures of space and sound. He creates sounds that are related to specific research on elements like flowers, machines, architecture, colour and sound bodies. Sonic and the visual aspects all come together in his sound installations. The musical works he releases on his own record label Cosmic Volume are often part of these sound-art installations."

As well as his own label Cosmic Volume, Jan Van Den Dobbelsteen has released music on (K-RAA-K)³, Diskono, Rotkop, Onomatopee amongst others.

The Danish musician Kristian Vester a.k.a. Goodiepal also operates under the alias Gæoudjiparl Van Den Dobbelsteen.
