= Theoretically Pure Anterograde Amnesia =

Studio album by the Caretaker
- Released: December 2005
- Genre: Dark ambient; drone; experimental; hauntology; noise; plunderphonics
- Length: 231:58
- Label: V/Vm Test
- Producer: Leyland Kirby

The Caretaker chronology
We'll All Go Riding on a Rainbow (2003)	Theoretically Pure Anterograde Amnesia (2005)	Additional Amnesiac Memories (2006)

Theoretically Pure Anterograde Amnesia (stylized as “Theoretically pure anterograde amnesia”) is the fourth studio album by the Caretaker, an alias of musician Leyland Kirby. Released in 2005, it abandoned the haunted ballroom aesthetic of the previous albums and explored memory loss. Divided into six CDs, it consists of seventy-two drone tracks combined to create an almost four hour long release. It was compared by several critics to other musicians, including Merzbow, Boards of Canada, and Krzysztof Penderecki.

The liner notes for Theoretically Pure Anterograde Amnesia were written by Mark Fisher. The blogger, who referenced the record on his book Ghosts of My Life (2014), died by suicide in 2017, for which Kirby created Take Care. It's a Desert Out There.... Theoretically Pure Anterograde Amnesia was met with general praise from music critics, who felt it improved on the Caretaker's style. However, some of the tracks were criticized for their production. The album has since been considered a precursor to the Caretaker's final and most acclaimed project, Everywhere at the End of Time.

== Background ==
The Caretaker was an alias of English musician Leyland Kirby that explored the haunted ballroom scene of the horror film The Shining. His first three albums are called the "haunted ballroom trilogy", spanning Selected Memories from the Haunted Ballroom (1999), A Stairway to the Stars (2001), and We'll All Go Riding on a Rainbow. According to Kirby, the Caretaker alias found a "big leap" with Theoretically Pure Anterograde Amnesia, as it explored memory loss. The album marks a conceptual change for the Caretaker alias, as its themes of memory loss made the pseudonym much more complex than previous releases did.

== Composition and style ==
Theoretically Pure Anterograde Amnesia explores drone, experimental, plunderphonics, dark ambient, hauntology, and noise. Divided into six CDs, it consists of minimal drones made from orchestral music samples by Anglo-Italian orchestra conductor Mantovani slowed down and reverberated to an extreme amount. All of these samples come from a 6xLP box set known as "The Magic of Mantovani", with each track on the album corresponding to tracks on the box set. It has a basic concept and sound design, with its track titles simply being "Memories". In the album, Kirby uses various filtering and echo effects to reflect the disorientation felt by an amnesiac.

== Production ==
Kirby's fascination with memory loss on the Caretaker's later albums started with Theoretically Pure Anterograde Amnesia. The musician said the CDs attempted to recreate the experience of having the disorder within sound; Kirby said, "Even if you listen over and over to all the songs, you still can't remember when these melodies will come in. You have no favourite tracks, it's like a dream you are trying to remember." According to Kirby, Theoretically Pure Anterograde Amnesia is a release that did not follow his trend of "creating a mood." He stated he made the album with the intention of making it hard to remember, "an audio fog in many ways." Kirby said the album can be confusing because of the way the tracks are titled combined with them all being of a relatively similar length. With the record, Kirby explored a specific condition rather than what he said were "memories or echoes of something." Kirby never specified hauntology as his goal but did call his music hauntological.

== Release ==
Isn't, in fact, theoretically pure anterograde amnesia the postmodern condition par excellence? The present - broken, desolated is constantly erasing itself, leaving few traces. Things catch your attention for a while but you do not remember them for very long. But old memories persist, intact... Constantly commemorated... I love 1923...

— Mark Fisher, Ghosts of My Life (2014)

Theoretically Pure Anterograde Amnesia was first released in December 2005 as a free download on Kirby's website for the V/Vm Test record label. It was later released in physical form with no track titles on 31 May 2006, featuring liner notes written by blogger Mark Fisher. The record's liner notes, as well as the album title, were later mentioned by him on his book Ghosts of My Life, released in 2014. After Fisher's suicide in 2017 with severe depression, Kirby released Take Care. It's a Desert Out There... in tribute of the writer and his descriptions of the Caretaker's music. According to the writer, Theoretically Pure Anterograde Amnesia had been "designed to be forgotten". Kirby later released several outtakes of the album on Additional Amnesiac Memories (2006) and another shorter album of similar style titled Deleted Scenes, Forgotten Dreams.

== Critical reception ==
Professional ratings
Review scores
Source	Rating
Grooves	3/5
Stylus Magazine	B+

Theoretically Pure Anterograde Amnesia received praise from music critics, who felt it improved the Caretaker's style. Writing for Grooves, Allan Harrison said it "is quite a trip", calling it one of the year's most ambitious albums, and one of the Caretaker's darkest releases. Scott McKeating of Stylus Magazine felt the record "needs to be checked out." However, he criticized some of the tracks, specifically "Memory Fifty", where it "sounds like The Caretaker just turned the whole thing backwards and pressed play." Brainwashed's Matthew Jeanes summarized his review with the statement that, if Kirby's six discs exploring amnesia are not "enough murky drone for a lifetime, I don't know what is." According to Kirby, the album was downloaded over 50,000 times and put him "back on the critical radar." It is the first Caretaker release to be presented as a "recommended disc" on Italian music magazine OndaRock.

== Track listing ==
Adapted from Bandcamp.

Part 1
No.	Title	Length
1.	"Memory One"	3:00
2.	"Memory Two"	3:03
3.	"Memory Three"	4:00
4.	"Memory Four"	4:24
5.	"Memory Five"	7:56
6.	"Memory Six"	3:23
7.	"Memory Seven"	3:33
8.	"Memory Eight"	3:20
9.	"Memory Nine"	4:08
10.	"Memory Ten"	1:55
11.	"Memory Eleven"	2:36
12.	"Memory Twelve"	3:14
Total length:		44:45

Part 2
No.	Title	Length
13.	"Memory Thirteen"	3:54
14.	"Memory Fourteen"	3:26
15.	"Memory Fifteen"	3:30
16.	"Memory Sixteen"	3:20
17.	"Memory Seventeen"	2:52
18.	"Memory Eighteen"	2:54
19.	"Memory Nineteen"	3:26
20.	"Memory Twenty"	3:39
21.	"Memory Twenty One"	3:39
22.	"Memory Twenty Two"	3:10
23.	"Memory Twenty Three"	4:00
24.	"Memory Twenty Four"	4:06
Total length:		42:09

Part 3
No.	Title	Length
25.	"Memory Twenty Five"	2:33
26.	"Memory Twenty Six"	3:05
27.	"Memory Twenty Seven"	3:00
28.	"Memory Twenty Eight"	3:43
29.	"Memory Twenty Nine"	3:23
30.	"Memory Thirty"	2:10
31.	"Memory Thirty One"	2:46
32.	"Memory Thirty Two"	3:10
33.	"Memory Thirty Three"	2:30
34.	"Memory Thirty Four"	3:02
35.	"Memory Thirty Five"	3:02
36.	"Memory Thirty Six"	4:37
Total length:		37:13

Part 4
No.	Title	Length
37.	"Memory Thirty Seven"	3:55
38.	"Memory Thirty Eight"	3:36
39.	"Memory Thirty Nine"	1:54
40.	"Memory Forty"	3:26
41.	"Memory Forty One"	2:26
42.	"Memory Forty Two"	3:39
43.	"Memory Forty Three"	3:16
44.	"Memory Forty Four"	3:06
45.	"Memory Forty Five"	3:39
46.	"Memory Forty Six"	3:16
47.	"Memory Forty Seven"	3:12
48.	"Memory Forty Eight"	3:27
Total length:		39:05

Part 5
No.	Title	Length
49.	"Memory Forty Nine"	4:11
50.	"Memory Fifty"	3:24
51.	"Memory Fifty One"	3:05
52.	"Memory Fifty Two"	2:47
53.	"Memory Fifty Three"	2:35
54.	"Memory Fifty Four"	3:03
55.	"Memory Fifty Five"	3:40
56.	"Memory Fifty Six"	3:07
57.	"Memory Fifty Seven"	3:29
58.	"Memory Fifty Eight"	2:38
59.	"Memory Fifty Nine"	3:07
60.	"Memory Sixty"	2:06
Total length:		37:24

Part 6
No.	Title	Length
61.	"Memory Sixty One"	1:55
62.	"Memory Sixty Two"	2:56
63.	"Memory Sixty Three"	4:00
64.	"Memory Sixty Four"	3:12
65.	"Memory Sixty Five"	2:04
66.	"Memory Sixty Six"	2:46
67.	"Memory Sixty Seven"	3:02
68.	"Memory Sixty Eight"	3:13
69.	"Memory Sixty Nine"	3:08
70.	"Memory Seventy"	3:21
71.	"Memory Seventy One"	2:44
72.	"Memory Seventy Two"	4:48
Total length:		37:22

Additional Amnesiac Memories
No.	Title	Length
1.	"Memory Seventy Three"	3:14
2.	"Memory Seventy Four"	2:58
3.	"Memory Seventy Five"	1:50
4.	"Memory Seventy Six"	2:51
5.	"Memory Seventy Seven"	3:42
6.	"Memory Seventy Eight"	2:44
7.	"Memory Seventy Nine"	2:15
8.	"Memory Eighty"	2:18
9.	"Memory Eighty One"	3:01
10.	"Memory Eighty Two"	10:10
11.	"Memory Eighty Three"	3:36
12.	"Memory Eighty Four"	3:18
13.	"Memory Eighty Five"	6:38
Total length:		48:43
