= Take Care. It's a Desert Out There... =

- Ivan Seal, Blame Shines Within the Demise (2016), oil on canvas

Studio album in tribute of Mark Fisher by the Caretaker
- Released: 8 December 2017
- Genre: Ambient
- Length: 48:33
- Label: History Always Favours the Winners
- Producer: Leyland Kirby

The Caretaker chronology
| Everywhere at the End of Time - Stage 3 (2017) | Take Care. It's a Desert Out There... (2017) | Everywhere at the End of Time - Stage 4 (2018) |

30-second sample
- file; help

Take Care. It's a Desert Out There... is the eleventh studio album by the Caretaker, an alias of musician Leyland Kirby. Released on 8 December 2017, Kirby composed it after the death of his collaborator, Mark Fisher, who died by suicide on January 13, 2017 at age 48. Consisting of a single title track throughout its 48-minute runtime, its proceeds would be donated to the mental health charity Mind. Kirby's initial intention would be to give the record to attendants of his performance at the Barbican Hall in London. However, due to a high demand, he decided to also release it on his YouTube channel.

== Background ==
Mark Fisher was an English writer who died by suicide in January 2017 with severe depression. He is most well known for his blog k-punk, his 2009 book Capitalist Realism, his 2014 book Ghosts of My Life and his 2017 book The Weird and the Eerie. He discussed his experience with depression in some articles. Fisher expressed an interest in Kirby's music as the Caretaker, having a symbiotic relationship with the musician. He debated of it on his 2014 book Ghosts of My Life, and in many occasions on the internet. He wrote liner notes for the Caretaker's 2005 release Theoretically Pure Anterograde Amnesia. Fisher, after Jacques Derrida's coinage of it, also used the term "hauntology", a genre often described as found in the Caretaker's style.

=== Naming ===
The first two words of Take Care. It's a Desert Out There are a reversed version of Kirby's moniker, the Caretaker. In addition, the phrase itself is the final line in the liner notes for the Caretaker's Theoretically Pure Anterograde Amnesia, which Fisher wrote. According to writer Adam Scovell from The Quietus, the album being not only "in memory of" but also "for" Fisher may suggest something. Questioning the nature of why this was done, he hypothesized of it as "the memory of a future now lost through his suicide as well as simultaneously in memory of, of course."

== Composition ==
We could go so far as to say that it is the human condition to be grotesque, since the human animal is the one that does not fit in, the freak of nature who has no place in the natural order and is capable of re-combining nature's products into hideous new forms.

— Mark Fisher, The Weird and the Eerie (2017)

Take Care. It's a Desert Out There... is an ambient album consisting of a single track in its runtime, presenting previously unreleased music by the Caretaker. According to writer Adam Scovell from The Quietus, its "fog of dead voices" makes it have "a sense of enveloping that suggests spatial qualities within the music." He wrote that the music is "haz[y]", that its meaning may be lost but, while in an obscure position, "there is still something communicable there at its core". The record features slight tonal changes, with the sounds sometimes overlapping and fading to make the listeners forget what they heard before. Scovell likened it to a film where all its frames are put together at once. The writer hypothesized the sound may depict what he called a "memory-scape" of Fisher. He felt the work negates being explicit in its core due to it being "beyond representation; loss via a too-soon, unexpected death." Scovell mentioned the EP Young Death by electronic musician Burial due to its naming combined with the fact that it was released soon before Fisher's death. While describing the depression of Fisher and of Kirby's record, Scovell added that there was still a sense of "quiet optimism" within Take Care. He explained that, as long as its "questioning" nature stays, "so does a slight glimmer that the system around us will eventually give way".

== Release and artwork ==
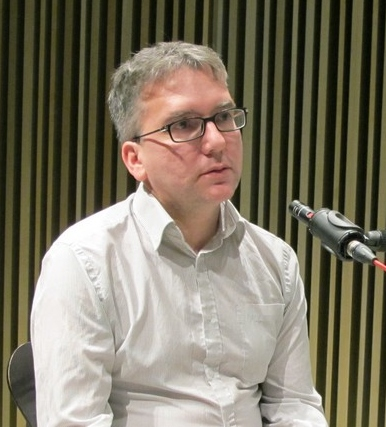
Mark Fisher in 2011.

The Caretaker released Take Care. It's a Desert Out There... on 15 December 2017, which was between the release of Stages 3-4 of his album series Everywhere at the End of Time. Kirby would give Take Care to people attending his performance at Barbican Hall in London. Released in 1800 copies of CD, it included a message stating its proceeds would be donated to the mental health charity Mind. However, due to high demand, Kirby decided to additionally release it on his YouTube channel, vvmtest. He affirmed in 2017 that only 350 of the CD copies were "signed and numbered," and that he would repress more of an approximate amount "at some point in the new year." Upon upload to Leyland's YouTube channel, the track's authorship information simply read "Remembered by the Caretaker", as opposed to the usual "Audio remembered, disfigured and forgotten by the Caretaker."

The artwork, painted in 2016 and named Blame Shines Within the Demise, was created by Kirby's long-time friend Ivan Seal. Seal performed with Kirby at the Barbican, to the confusion of some writers who thought Seal was Mark Fisher. Like in Everywhere at the End of Time, Seal's paintings in the context of Kirby's music, specifically as the Caretaker, received praise. However, writer Matt Colquhoun praised them for different reasons. He felt that Seal's abstract style "lends itself well to capturing the positive side of the Caretaker's otherwise melancholic project." The writer noticed his bric-à-brac works as being "another example of psychedelic domesticity."

== Personnel ==
Adapted from YouTube.

- Leyland Kirby – "remembering" of the audio
- Stephan Mathieu – mastering
- Ivan Seal – album cover

== Release history ==
Release formats for Take Care. It's a Desert Out There...
| Region | Release date | Label | Format | Cat. no. | Ref. |
|---|---|---|---|---|---|
| Worldwide | 5 April 2018 | History Always Favours the Winners | CD | HAFTW024 | |
| Worldwide | 7 August 2019 | History Always Favours the Winners | CD | HAFTW024 | |
