= A Token of My Extreme =

Song by Frank Zappa

from the album Joe's Garage Acts II & III
- Released: November 19, 1979
- Recorded: Village Recorders, LA; Spring 1979
- Genre: Progressive rock; comedy rock
- Length: 5:30
- Label: Zappa Records
- Songwriter(s): Frank Zappa
- Producer(s): Frank Zappa

"A Token of My Extreme", by Frank Zappa, is a song on the 1979 concept album Joe's Garage Acts II & III. The main character from this triple-album rock-opera has his mind messed-up by Lucille then "finally does something smart" and "pays a lot of money to L. Ron Hoover and the First Church of Appliantology."

== Plot ==
Appliantology is shown as an insincere religion, which cooperates with a "malevolent totalitarian regime." This is an apparent reference to Scientology and its founder L. Ron Hubbard. Joe, doubting his sanity, asks 'mystical advisor' L. Ron Hoover what his problem is and is told that he is "a latent appliance-fetishist." Joe asks if it is time "to come out of the closet," and is told that he should "go into the closet". "The Closet" turns out to be a bar in Los Angeles, where he can have "a lot of fun" achieving sexual gratification using machines. The "machines" at The Closet are household appliances with marital aids stuck all over them. Joe is informed that the best appliances speak foreign languages, which leads to the next song, "Stick It Out". This song derives from another piece called "Tush Tush Tush" from 1973.

== Analysis ==
This song was analyzed in Zappa, and also in Academy Zappa. In their study of Zappa published in the journal Studies in Musical Theatre, Carr and Hand mention that the song is "a satire of L. Ron Hubbard (1911–86) and the Church of Scientology". They described the work as "an ironic precursor" to Carlton's Return to the Forbidden Planet.

== See also ==
- Scientology in popular culture
