= We'll All Go Riding on a Rainbow =

2003 studio album by the Caretaker

Studio album by the Caretaker
- Released: 1 July 2003
- Genres: Ambient; British dance band; dark ambient; electronic; experimental; hauntology; noise; plunderphonics
- Length: 51:29
- Label: V/Vm Test
- Producer: Leyland Kirby

The Caretaker chronology
A Stairway to the Stars (2001)	We'll All Go Riding on a Rainbow (2003)	Theoretically Pure Anterograde Amnesia (2005)

Audio sample
- "The weeping dancefloor": file; help

We'll All Go Riding on a Rainbow is the third studio album by the Caretaker, an alias of musician Leyland Kirby. Released in 2003, it was the last of Kirby's "haunted ballroom trilogy", which spans his albums mainly influenced by the film The Shining. It features distorted melodies from the 20th century to recreate the ambience of The Shining's ballroom. We'll All Go Riding on a Rainbow was met with positive reception from music critics, who praised its themes of the paranormal. Kirby's next album as the Caretaker, Theoretically Pure Anterograde Amnesia (2005) would abandon the haunted ballroom concept and install themes of memory loss.

== Background ==
The Caretaker's first record, Selected Memories from the Haunted Ballroom (1999), was inspired by the haunted ballroom scene from the film The Shining. Leyland Kirby, the English musician responsible for the Caretaker's album, was involved in controversy due to his V/Vm alias, under which he manipulated pop songs to create several noise releases, such as an extreme distortion of "The Lady in Red" by musician Chris de Burgh. Following the Caretaker's debut, A Stairway to the Stars found praise from music critics for its atmosphere. His first three albums under the Caretaker alias were later named the "haunted ballroom trilogy" due to their influence from The Shining's scene. Kirby's next release after We'll All Go Riding on a Rainbow, Theoretically Pure Anterograde Amnesia (2005) would add several layers of complexity to the pseudonym, as it directly explored memory loss.

== Composition and release ==
We'll All Go Riding on a Rainbow explores hauntology, noise, British dance band, electronic, experimental, and dark ambient. Its 16 tracks sample ballroom songs from the early 20th century, Each track is made up of slowed and warped brass instruments, surface noise, reverberation, and pitch effects, meant to be eerie and atmospheric. Like in The Disintegration Loops (2002–2003) by composer William Basinski, the record involves themes of decay, degradation, and deterioration. The album's atmosphere is similar to that of The Shining's Overlook Hotel, with hissing and clicks overlaying orchestras.

"Contemplation"
"Contemplation" differs from other songs, as it mimics a sonar. Like Canadian musician Loscil, it uses various noises to create its sound.

We'll All Go Riding on a Rainbow was released on 1 July 2003. On the topic of a reissue of We'll All Go Riding on a Rainbow or A Stairway to the Stars, Kirby said: "I just need to work out what and when." The background noises and strange effects produce the Caretaker's signature sound. A track that differs from these patterns is "Contemplation", where by its sonar-like style uses several noises sourced from its sample, making it stand out from the other compositions.

=== Artwork ===
The artwork is the sourced from the 1977 compilation album And the Bands Played On. It depicts a dancing couple in front of a pedestal, on which sits a band with white suits. Most of the faces are solidly black, only the couple showing any sort of facial features. The cover itself seems to show a reality losing shape; the couple looks straight ahead as if inviting the viewer to join them.

== Critical reception ==
Professional ratings
Review scores
Source	Rating
AllMusic	3.5/5 stars
Stylus Magazine	B−

We'll All Go Riding on a Rainbow was met with generally positive reception from music critics, who praised its haunted ballroom ambiance, although some criticized its length and concept. AllMusic critic John Bush stated the record could even convince listeners that "Kirby has actually spent time in a haunted ballroom". Writing for Stylus Magazine, Todd Burns criticized the 50-minute length, which made it fall "prey to the problem of most screwed music". Noting the record's difference to Kirby's V/Vm releases, Andy Slocombe of Comes with a Smile felt the album's "depth is sometimes breathtaking, and the overall effect is totally all-consuming," and added that it is "highly recommended, if you're up to it." When reviewing the Caretaker's later record Patience (After Sebald) (2012), Fact argued We'll All Go Riding on a Rainbow was when the haunted ballroom concept started leaving listeners "wondering just how much mileage could be left in such an idiosyncratic and specific aesthetic." The album's opener, "I saw your face in a dream", was one of the listed tracks on a program of the BBC Radio 1.

== Track listing ==
Adapted from Bandcamp.

We'll All Go Riding on a Rainbow track listing
No.	Title	Length
1.	"I saw your face in a dream"	4:29
2.	"We'll all go riding on a rainbow"	1:22
3.	"That old feeling"	3:08
4.	"The weeping dancefloor"	5:50
5.	"Driven beyond the limits"	2:05
6.	"The memory of a song"	3:09
7.	"And the bands played on"	2:05
8.	"Here I am broken hearted"	3:16
9.	"Hoping for some kind of recognition"	2:20
10.	"Under a warm golden light"	1:54
11.	"Unmasking at midnight"	2:47
12.	"Roll up the carpet and dance"	2:05
13.	"Contemplation"	5:44
14.	"Faith in time"	3:14
15.	"We have been here before"	4:23
16.	"Stardust"	3:38
Total length:		51:29
