= Bobby Crush =

English pianist (born 1954)

- Born: Robert Nicholas Crush; 23 March 1954 (age 72); Leyton, London, England
- Instrument: Piano

Robert Nicholas Crush (professionally known as Bobby Crush), born 23 March 1954, is an English pianist, songwriter, actor and television presenter.

== Biography ==
Bobby Crush first came to public attention after six winning appearances on Hughie Green's British ITV talent show, Opportunity Knocks in 1972. He received the Variety Club of Great Britain award for Best New Artist of that year. He was signed to a 7 album deal with Philips Records, where his albums were produced by Norman Newell who had previously worked with Russ Conway, Judy Garland, Johnny Mathis and Dame Shirley Bassey. By the time he was 18, Bobby had an album in the top 20, a single ("Borsalino") in the top 40 and had made his professional debut at the London Palladium in a two week season with American singer Jack Jones. There followed two further Palladium seasons with Vic Damone and Dame Julie Andrews.

Other West End successes include a year at the Victoria Palace in London with Max Bygraves in "SwingalongaMax" and an appearance in "The Royal Variety Performance" for Queen Elizabeth, the Queen Mother.

His TV credits include two series of "Sounds Like Music" as the show's host, "Pointless Celebrities", "Celebrity Eggheads", "This Morning", "When Saturday Night TV Goes Horribly Wrong", "Celebrity Squares", "Wetty Henthropp Investigates" with Victoria Wood and Julie Walters for "Comic Relief", "Through The Keyhole",, "Cash in the Celebrity Attic", "The Antiques Roadshow", "Live from Her Majesty's", "Give Us A Clue", "Noel's House Party", "The Unforgettable Hughie Green", "Victoria Wood, as seen on TV", "Jim Davidson's Generation Game", "The Talent Show Story" and countless guest appearances. He has also been a guest judge on Sky TV's talent show "Star Search" and "Pot of Gold" with Des O'Connor. Bobby played "Billy Sparkle" in the popular TV comedy "Benidorm" and was seen recently in a major new series for ITV called "Last Laugh in Vegas", which documented Bobby's American debut alongside 7 other legendary British acts.

Bobby's work abroad has also been extensive: a tour of Canada with Sir Harry Secombe and concerts in Australia and New Zealand, where he received a gold disc for sales of his "Piano Party" album.

Other career highlights include a 45 date tour with 60's singing star Gene Pitney, an appearance at the Royal Albert Hall in "The Stonewall Equality Show" and a national tour of "Back to Bacharach", his tribute show to the legendary composer Burt Bacharach, for which he also wrote the script.

As an actor, his theatrical roles include "Dr. Frank N. Furter" in "The Rocky Horror Show", "Vernon Gersch" in "They're Playing Our Song", "LM" in "Pump Boys and Dinettes", "Billy Flynn" in "Chicago" and "Jerry, the agent" in "Summer Holiday, the Musical". He also portrayed the American pianist Liberace in "Liberace's Suit" at the Jermyn Street Theatre in London and also in the one-man show "Liberace, Live from Heaven" (Leicester Square Theatre / Edinburgh Festival / 34 date tour of New Zealand)

Crush's many radio broadcasts include his own week of shows on BBC Radio 2 and as guest contributor on many other programmes including Ken Bruce's Radio 2 show, where he featured on "The Tracks of My Years" segment. His "40th Birthday Concert", aired on BBC Radio 2, was nominated for the "Monte Carlo Radio Prize" and such was its success that a follow-up show, "Bobby Crush - Centre Stage" was immediately commissioned.

Crush's recordings include his debut album Bobby Crush, which reached no. 15 in the UK Albums Chart, and chart singles "Borsalino" and "The Sting". He has made 13 studio albums as a pianist, not including compilations. His Double Decker Party Album, which was TV-advertised, sold over 100,000 copies and brought him a double gold disc.

His greatest success as a songwriter was penning both the music and lyrics for Keith Harris and Orville's hit "Orville's Song" (also known as "I Wish I Could Fly"), which reached no. 4 in the UK singles chart, sold 250,000 copies and brought Crush a silver disc.

Bobby has starred in many pantomimes, starting out as a teenager in "juvenile lead" roles but in recent years, he has become one of the UK's most in-demand "Dames", a role he has played every year since 2000. In January 2021, Bobby was inducted into "The Panto Archive Hall of Fame" in recognition of his 37 panto appearances from 1973 to present day.

Bobby is currently writing his autobiography, which has the working title "Not The Boy Next Door" ... it is hoped that it will be published in the near future. He continues to play regular concert and cabaret dates in the UK

== Personal life ==
Crush came out publicly as gay in an interview with Gay Times in 2004. He lives in London's West End.

== Chart discography ==
=== Albums ===
- Bobby Crush (1972) – UK no. 15
- The Bobby Crush Incredible Double Decker (1982) – UK no. 53
- All Time Piano Hits
- Piano Party
- Smash Hits including The Sting
- 35 Piano Pops
- Honky Tonk Favourites
- Hits of the Thirties
- Music, Music, Music!
- Bobby Crush plays Elton John
- First Love
- Hollywood and Broadway
- Reel Music (Melodies from the Movies)
- The Best of Bobby Crush
- Bobby Crush: The Definitive Collection

=== Singles ===
- "Borsalino" (1972) – UK no. 37
- "The Good Old Bad Old Days" (1973)
- "The Gondolas of Venice" (1973)
- "The Sting " (1974)
- "Mayday" (1974)
- "Hangin' Out" (1974)
- "The Chinese Bicycle" (1976)
- "Lonely Ballerina" (1984)
- "Brendan's Theme" (1984)
