= Xenochrony =

Musical technique

Xenochrony is a studio-based musical technique developed at an unknown date, but possibly as early as the early 1960s, by Frank Zappa, who used it on several albums. Xenochrony is executed by extracting a guitar solo or other musical part from its original context and placing it into a completely different song, to create an unexpected but pleasing effect. He said that this was the only way to achieve some rhythms.

== Etymology ==
The word derives from the Greek words ξένος (xenos), strange or alien, and χρόνος (chronos), time.

== Examples ==
One of the most prominent examples of xenochrony can be found on Zappa's rock opera Joe's Garage (1979), on which the guitar solos are all xenochronous (with the exceptions of "Watermelon in Easter Hay" and "Crew Slut").

In the words of Zappa himself:

A classic "Xenochrony" piece would be "Rubber Shirt", which is a song on the Sheik Yerbouti album. It takes a drum set part that was added to a song at one tempo. The drummer was instructed to play along with this one particular thing in a certain time signature, eleven-four, and that drum set part was extracted like a little piece of DNA from that master tape and put over here into this little cubicle. And then the bass part, which was designed to play along with another song at another speed, another rate in another time signature, four-four, that was removed from that master tape and put over here, and then the two were sandwiched together. And so the musical result is the result of two musicians, who were never in the same room at the same time, playing at two different rates in two different moods for two different purposes, when blended together, yielding a third result which is musical and synchronizes in a strange way. That's Xenochrony. And I've done that on a number of tracks.

Xenochrony can be heard as early in Zappa's career as 1968: on The Mothers of Invention's We're Only in It for the Money, the rhythm track from the chorus line of "How Could I Be Such A Fool" on Freak Out! (which consists of the drums, bass, vibraphone and orchestra) is used on the ending of "Lonely Little Girl." This is noticeable when listening to the backing tracks without vocals, which appear on the posthumous box set releases The MOFO Project/Object and Lumpy Money. On Uncle Meat, a phrase from the guitar solo of "Nine Types of Industrial Pollution" appears later on at the end of "Sleeping in a Jar". Several earlier possible examples of xenochrony can be heard on Lumpy Gravy, Zappa's first solo album. A passage from "Harry, You're a Beast" may or may not be incorporated in "Almost Chinese": a harpsichord/xylophone sounding instruments plus several "snorks" can be heard directly after Larry's dialogue with Motorhead Sherwood. Also, the sound effect that begins "Flower Punk" from We're Only in It for the Money, released months earlier, is played at approximately 0:19 of Part 2, 15:19 or 15:20 of the record. Excerpts from "The World's Greatest Sinner" soundtrack, composed by Zappa, are audible on both "I Don't Know If I can Go Through This Again" (from Lumpy Gravy) and "Mother People" (from We're Only in It for the Money).

Simon & Garfunkel also used this technique on their 1968 Bookends album. The second track on the album, "Save the Life of My Child." uses the first few seconds of "The Sound Of Silence" (released on their 1966 Sounds of Silence album) around the 1:20 mark in a slowed-down fashion.

Another example is the King Crimson song "The Devil's Triangle", on their 1970 album In the Wake of Poseidon, which uses elements of "The Court of the Crimson King" near the end.

Another example is The Arms of Someone New song "Believe Me", on their 1986 album Love, Power & Justice, which uses a casio solo left on the multitrack tape. "As we were working on “Believe Me," we discovered there was something on one track that we hadn’t recorded over yet, and there was Tim’s Casio solo from the other song, in the perfect spot, in the right key, so... we kept it!"

Other examples are the albums from avant-garde guitarist Buckethead, Forensic Follies and Needle in a Slunk Stack, released in 2009: both featured songs from several Buckethead albums to make new songs.

The technique was used by Dream Theater at the beginning of the song "The Dance of Eternity", where samples from their earlier song "Metropolis Pt. 1" briefly fade in and out against a slower drum and bass beat.

Car Seat Headrest used the technique on the 2010 album 3, albeit in a unique way; the song "Beach Drugs" (Track 10) prominently features a reversed version of "Sun Hot" (Track 6) in its outro. This reversed version of "Sun Hot" was later released on the compilation Little Pieces of Paper With 'No' Written on Them as "Hot Sun."

== See also ==
- Polyrhythm
- Mashup (music)
- Sampling (music)
