= A Little Green Rosetta =

Song by Frank Zappa

from the album Joe's Garage Acts II & III
- Released: November 19, 1979
- Recorded: Village Recorders, LA; Spring 1979
- Length: 8:15
- Label: Zappa Records
- Songwriter(s): Frank Zappa
- Producer(s): Frank Zappa

"A Little Green Rosetta", by Frank Zappa, is the final song on the 1979 concept album Joe's Garage Acts II & III. The main character from this triple-album rock opera is faced with the decline of the music industry, and is forced to work on an assembly line placing little frosted rosettes on top of muffins at the Utility Muffin Research Kitchen facility (a self-reference to Zappa's private studio)

The song forms a coda for Joe's Garage, completing the song cycle of the album. The opening narration by Zappa as the Central Scrutinizer, describing his job at the facility, is nearly identical to the opening preamble to the 1975 song "Muffin Man" from Bongo Fury. "A Little Green Rosetta" is the only song on Joe's Garage where Zappa's entire studio band sings along to the chorus.

Zappa's dialogue in the Joe's Garage recording also lampoons Steve Gadd's status as one of the highest-paid session drummers in popular music. This song was analyzed in the books Zappa, and Academy Zappa.

An earlier recording of the song was made at the Record Plant in Los Angeles in 1975. The 1975 recording featured only brief piano and vocal parts from Zappa. This was included on the Läther album in 1977. It was not officially released at the time, but was widely traded among Zappa fans as a bootleg recording before its official release in 1996.

At one point in the song, Zappa quotes from the U.S. doowop song "Rang Tang Ding Dong (I Am the Japanese Sandman)" by the Cellos.

== Personnel ==
- Frank Zappa – lead guitar, lead vocals
- Warren Cuccurullo – rhythm guitar, vocals
- Denny Walley – slide guitar, vocals
- Ike Willis – vocals
- Peter Wolf – keyboards
- Tommy Mars – keyboards
- Arthur Barrow – bass, backing vocals
- Ed Mann – percussion, vocals
- Vinnie Colaiuta – drums
