= Minipops =

1983 British television series

- Created by: Martin Wyatt
- Country of origin: United Kingdom
- Original language: English
- No. of series: 1
- No. of episodes: 6

Production
- Executive producer: Mike Mansfield
- Running time: 30 minutes (including adverts)
- Production company: Mike Mansfield Enterprises

Original release
- Network: Channel 4
- Release: 8 February – 15 March 1983

Minipops was a television series broadcast in 1983 on Channel 4 in the United Kingdom. Designed primarily for younger viewers, it consisted of music performances from preteen children singing then-contemporary pop music hits and older classics. The children were usually made to look like the original performers, including clothing and make-up. Controversy erupted over how appropriate the show's content was for children, as many of the selected songs contained sexual innuendo, and the young performers were made to wear adult costumes and make-up; this controversy led to the show's cancellation after one series.

== History ==
Minipops was the brainchild of Martin Wyatt, who created a new child group from London called the MiniPops and released an album in 1982 which reached the top 30 in the UK and Europe. This resulted in a French record label releasing a single from the album, "Stupid Cupid", which was sung by Martin Wyatt's young daughter Jo. The song reached number 1 in France, knocking "Ebony and Ivory" off the top spot.

Cecil Korer, then head of entertainment at Channel 4, and record producer Mike Mansfield embraced the idea of producing a TV show around the MiniPops. Korer believed it would boost and broaden the group's audience appeal. On 4 July 1982, thousands of amateur child performers from across Britain descended on a London theatre for the audition in a search to find additional children to sing and star in the television show with the original five members of the group.

== Criticism ==
=== Contemporary ===
The programme began attracting criticism from commentators in the British media for the portrayal of children in this manner. One especially controversial segment featured a five-year-old girl singing Sheena Easton's "9 to 5", with the line "we make love" left intact. Writing for The Observer, Julian Barnes said that Minipops was "certainly tasteless and appalling; the harder question is whether it's corrupt or corrupting", and went on to criticize the decision to put children in adult makeup and costumes. A caller on Channel 4's Right to Reply programme stated, "Minipops should be called MiniWhores. Are you people out of your mind?" There were also concerns about the psychological effects that such sexual content would have on the child performers. An episode of the sketch show A Kick Up the Eighties featured a parody of Minipops, with Tracey Ullman singing as a young girl in skimpy clothing while three men in dark clothes leered at her, a moment critics called "damning".

=== Legacy ===
Minipops is regarded as one of the worst television programmes of all time. In 2006, John Naughton of The Radio Times named it the second-worst British television show of all time. In 2019, The Daily Telegraph referred to it as an "all-round televisual tragedy". Interviewed on TV Hell, former Channel 4 commissioning editor Mike Bolland called it "a great miracle" that Minipops managed to last a series.

== Discography ==
Seven albums were produced and released in the UK, Europe and Canada.

=== Albums ===
Before the television show:

- The Mini Pops (1982)

After the television show:

- We're the Mini Pops (1983)
- Christmas (1984)
- Let's Dance (1984)
- Wanna Have Fun (1985)
- Magic Juke Box (1986)
- Rocket to the Stars (1989)

In Canada We're the Mini Pops was successful, becoming the third-highest-selling album in Canada at the time. This prompted the Minipops to hold a three-week tour in 1983, enjoying controversy-free success.

A number of singles were released across Europe.

== See also ==
- Kids Incorporated
- Kidz Bop
