= Joe's Garage =

1979 studio album by Frank Zappa

- Original cover art for Act I; used on front cover of triple album set

Studio album with live elements by Frank Zappa
- Released: September 3, 1979 (Act I); November 19, 1979 (Acts II & III)
- Recorded: March–June 1979
- Studios: Village Recorders "B", Hollywood
- Genre: Rock
- Length: 115:14
- Label: Zappa
- Producer: Frank Zappa

Frank Zappa chronology
Orchestral Favorites (1979)	Joe's Garage (1979)	Tinsel Town Rebellion (1981)

Singles from Joe's Garage
- 1. "Joe's Garage" Released: October 29, 1979; 2. "Stick It Out" Released: 1979

Joe's Garage is a three-part rock opera released by American musician Frank Zappa in September and November 1979. Originally released as two separate albums on Zappa Records, the project was later remastered and reissued as a triple album box set, Joe's Garage Acts I, II & III, in 1987. The story is told by a character identified as the "Central Scrutinizer" narrating the story of Joe, an average adolescent male, from Canoga Park, Los Angeles, who forms a garage rock band, has unsatisfying relationships with women, gives all of his money to a government-assisted and insincere religion, explores sexual activities with appliances, and is imprisoned. After being released from prison into a dystopian society in which music itself has been criminalized, he lapses into insanity.

The album encompasses a large spectrum of musical styles, while its lyrics often feature satirical or humorous commentary on American society and politics. It addresses themes of individualism, free will, censorship, the music industry and human sexuality, while criticizing government and religion, and satirizing Catholicism and Scientology. Joe's Garage is noted for its use of xenochrony, a recording technique that takes musical material (in this instance, guitar solos by Zappa from older live recordings) and overdubs them onto different, unrelated material. All solos on the album are xenochronous except for "Crew Slut" and "Watermelon in Easter Hay", a signature song that Zappa described as the best song on the album, and according to his son Dweezil, the best guitar solo his father ever played.

Joe's Garage initially received mixed to positive reviews, with critics praising its innovative and original music, but criticizing the scatological, sexual and profane nature of the lyrics. Since its original release, the album has been reappraised as one of Zappa's best works.

== Background ==
After completing contractual obligations with DiscReet Records and distributor Warner Bros. Records in March 1977, Zappa formed Zappa Records, with distribution in the US and Canada by Phonogram Inc. He released the successful double album Sheik Yerbouti (1979, recorded 8/1977-2/1978), and began working on a series of songs for a follow-up album. The songs "Joe's Garage" and "Catholic Girls" were recorded with the intention that Zappa would release each as a single. Throughout the development of Joe's Garage, Zappa's band recorded lengthy jams which Zappa later formed into the album. The album also continued the development of xenochrony, a technique Zappa also featured on One Size Fits All (1975), in which aspects of older live recordings were utilized to create new compositions by overdubbing them onto studio recordings, or alternatively, selecting a previously recorded solo and allowing drummer Vinnie Colaiuta to improvise a new drum performance, interacting with the previously recorded piece.

Midway through recording the new album, Zappa decided that the songs connected coherently and wrote a story, changing the new album into a rock opera. Joe's Garage was the final album Zappa recorded at a commercial studio. Zappa's own studio, the Utility Muffin Research Kitchen, built as an addition to Zappa's home, and completed in late 1979, was used to record and mix all of his subsequent releases.

== Style and influences ==
=== Lyrical and story themes ===
Eventually it was discovered, that God did not want us to be all the same. This was Bad News for the Governments of The World, as it seemed contrary to the doctrine of Portion Controlled Servings. Mankind must be made more uniformly if The Future was going to work. Various ways were sought to bind us all together, but, alas, same-ness was unenforceable. It was about this time, that someone came up with the idea of Total Criminalization. Based on the principle, that if we were all crooks, we could at last be uniform to some degree in the eyes of The Law. [...] Total Criminalization was the greatest idea of its time and was vastly popular except with those people, who didn't want to be crooks or outlaws, so, of course, they had to be Tricked Into It... which is one of the reasons, why music was eventually made Illegal.

— Joe's Garage Acts II & III liner notes, 1979

The lyrical themes of Joe's Garage involve individualism, sexuality, and the danger of large government. The album is narrated by a government employee identifying himself as The Central Scrutinizer, who delivers a cautionary tale about Joe, a typical adolescent male who forms a band as the government prepares to criminalize music. The Central Scrutinizer explains that music leads to a "slippery slope" of drug use, disease, unusual sexual practices, prison, and eventually, insanity. According to Scott Schinder and Andy Schwartz, Zappa's narrative of censorship reflected the censorship of music during the Iranian Revolution of 1979, where rock music was made illegal.

The title track is noted as having an autobiographical aspect, as the character of Larry (as performed by Zappa himself) sings that the band plays the same song repeatedly because "it sounded good to me". In real life, Zappa said he wrote and played music for himself, his sole intended audience. The song also takes lyrical inspiration from bands playing in bars like The Mothers of Invention once had, and shady record deals Zappa had experienced in the past. In "Joe's Garage", Joe finds that the music industry is "not everything it is cracked up to be". The song refers to a number of music fads, including new wave, heavy metal, disco and glitter rock, and is critical of the music industry of the late 1970s.

"Catholic Girls" is critical of the Catholic Church, and satirizes "the hypocrisy of the myth of the good Catholic girl." While Zappa was in favor of the sexual revolution, he regarded himself as a pioneer in publicly discussing honesty about sexual intercourse, stating

"American sexual attitudes are controlled as a necessary tool of business and government in order to perpetuate themselves. Unless people begin to see through that, to see past it to what sex is really all about, they're always going to have the same neurotic attitudes. It's very neatly packaged. It all works hand-in-hand with the churches and political leaders at the point where elections are coming up."

This view inspired the lyrical content of "Crew Slut", in which Mary, Joe's girlfriend, falls into the groupie lifestyle, going on to participate in a wet T-shirt contest in the following track, "Fembot in a Wet T-Shirt".

"Why Does It Hurt When I Pee?" was written in the summer of 1978. Zappa's road manager, Phil Kaufman, alleged that the song was written after Kaufman had asked that very question; within the context of the album's storyline, it is sung by Joe after he receives a sexually transmitted disease from Lucille, "a girl, who works at the Jack in the Box". The Central Scrutinizer continues to express the hypothesis that "girls, music, disease, heartbreak [...] all go together." Halfway through the album's libretto, Zappa expressed the belief that governments believe that people are inherently criminals, and continue to invent laws, which gives states the legal grounds to arrest people, leading to the fictional criminalization of music which occurs towards the end of the album's storyline.

"A Token of My Extreme" satirizes Scientology and L. Ron Hubbard, as well as new age beliefs and the sexual revolution. It describes an insincere religion, which co-operates with a "malevolent totalitarian regime." "Stick It Out" contains lyrical references to Zappa's songs "What Kind Of Girl", "Bwana Dik", "Sofa No. 2", and "Dancin' Fool". "Dong Work For Yuda" was written as a tribute to Zappa's bodyguard, John Smothers, and features Terry Bozzio imitating Smothers' dialect and speech. "Keep It Greasy" is a lyrical tribute to anal sex. Following Joe's imprisonment and release, the libretto describes a dystopian future, accompanied musically by long guitar solos, which Joe imagines in his head. The penultimate song, "Packard Goose", criticizes rock journalism, and features a philosophical monolog delivered by an apparition of the character Mary, who had been absent since the first act. In the epilogue song "A Little Green Rosetta," Joe gives up music, returns to sanity, hocks his imaginary guitar and gets "a good job" at the Utility Muffin Research Kitchen Facility (a self-reference to Zappa's own personal studio). The Central Scrutinizer sings the last song on the album in his "regular voice", and joins in a long musical number with most of the other people that worked with Zappa around 1979.

=== Plot ===
==== Act I ====
At the beginning of the album, we are introduced to "The Central Scrutinizer", the album's narrator, who brings us a "special presentation" on music's bad influences on man. We are introduced to Joe, the main character in the presentation. Joe used to be the lead singer in a garage band, which eventually broke up ("Joe's Garage"). Joe continues playing his music until a neighbor calls the police, who tell Joe to "stick closer to church-oriented social activities." Joe starts going to the Catholic Youth Organization (CYO) at the Catholic Church, held by Father Riley, and falls in love with a girl named Mary ("Catholic Girls").

One day, Mary skips the church club and goes to the Armory. She becomes a groupie for a band called Toad-O ("Crew Slut"). Eventually, Mary, unable to keep up with the band's laundry, is dumped in Miami. With no money to get home, she signs up for the local Wet T-Shirt Contest at the Brasserie, hosted by Father Riley (who has since changed his name to Buddy Jones) ("Wet T-Shirt Nite"). Mary wins first place in the contest and wins fifty bucks, enough money to go home. However, Warren, a former member of Joe's Garage Band, finds out about Mary's "naughty exploits" and sends a letter to Joe telling him about it ("Toad-O Line"). Joe, heartbroken, "falls in with a fast crowd" and gets seduced by Lucille, a girl who works at the Jack in the Box, and has sex with her, only to catch gonorrhea ("Why Does It Hurt When I Pee?"). Discouraged, he sings about Lucille and his feelings for her ("Lucille Has Messed My Mind Up").

==== Act II ====
Joe is in "a quandary, being devoured by the swirling cesspool of his own steaming desires" and seeks redemption; he decides to "pay a lot of money" to the First Church of Appliantology, owned by L. Ron Hoover, an amount of fifty bucks ("A Token of My Extreme"). He learns from Hoover that he is a "Latent Appliance Fetishist", learns German, dresses like a housewife and goes to a club called the "Closet", filled with sexual appliances. Joe meets Sy Borg, a "Model XQJ-37 Nuclear Powered Pansexual Roto-Plooker", who looks like a "Cross between an Industrial Vacuum Cleaner and a Chrome-Plated Piggy Bank with marital aids stuck all over it", and falls in love with him ("Stick It Out"). They go back to Sy's apartment and have sex, only for Joe to accidentally kill him when a "golden shower" causes his master circuit to short out ("Sy Borg").

Having given all his money to Hoover, Joe cannot pay to fix Sy and is arrested and sent to a special prison filled with people arrested due to music, who spend all day "snorting detergent and plooking each other". At the prison, he meets Bald-Headed John, "King of the Plookers" ("Dong Work for Yuda"). Joe is eventually "plooked" by the executives at the prison ("Keep It Greasey"). Having "a long time to go before [he's] paid [his] debt to society", he decides to be "sullen and withdrawn" and sits around dreaming up imaginary guitar notes ("Outside Now"), until he is released from prison (a bit of art imitating life, as Zappa himself did just that during his own prison sentence in 1965).

==== Act III ====
Joe is released from prison into a dystopian society where music has been made illegal and "[walks] through the parking lot in a semi-catatonic state", dreaming guitar notes. Eventually, he hears the voice of his neighbor Mrs. Borg taunting him in his head ("He Used to Cut the Grass"). Joe becomes scared of rock journalists and sings about them. He sees a vision of Mary appear and deliver a lecture ("Packard Goose"). Joe goes back to his house and dreams his last imaginary guitar notes ("Watermelon in Easter Hay"). Afterward, he "[hocks his] imaginary guitar and [gets] a good job" at the Utility Muffin Research Kitchen, where he squeezes icing rosettes onto muffins. As an epilogue, the Central Scrutinizer turns off his plastic megaphone and sings the final song on the album, "A Little Green Rosetta", with most of the people who worked at Village Recorders around 1979, with the song growing more chaotic as it goes as "proof" that music is dangerous.

=== Music and performance ===
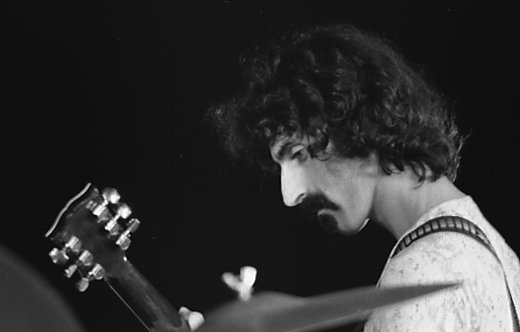
Joe's Garage is noted for its extensive guitar-oriented work, including live improvisations which were incorporated into new studio compositions using xenochrony.

The music of Joe's Garage encompassed a variety of styles, including blues, jazz, doo wop, lounge, orchestral, rock, pop and reggae. "Catholic Girls" makes musical reference to Zappa's controversial song "Jewish Princess", as a sitar plays the melody of the earlier song during the fadeout of "Catholic Girls". "Crew Slut" is performed as a slow blues song, with slide guitar riffs and a harmonica solo. According to Kelly Fisher Lowe, the song is "more Rolling Stones or Aerosmith than it is Gatemouth Brown or Guitar Watson". The extended three and a half minute, two-part guitar solo in "Toad-O-Line" is taken from Zappa's earlier song, "Inca Roads."

"A Token Of My Extreme" originated as an instrumental song played during improvised conversations by saxophonist Napoleon Murphy Brock and George Duke on keyboards. It typically opened Zappa's concerts in 1974; a recording of this version of the piece was released under the title "Tush Tush Tush (A Token of My Extreme)" on You Can't Do That on Stage Anymore, Vol. 2.

"Lucille Has Messed My Mind Up" first appeared on Jeff Simmons' album of the same name, on which its writing is credited to "La Marr Bruister", one of Zappa's pseudonyms. The Joe's Garage arrangement is radically different, and is played in a reggae style. "Stick It Out" originated as part of the Mothers of Invention's "Sofa" routine in the early 1970s. The Joe's Garage version is musically influenced by funk and disco, with its lyrics performed first in German, and then in English. "Sy Borg" derives from funk, reggae and R&B.

"Keep It Greasy" had been performed by Zappa since 1975; the Joe's Garage album version features a guitar solo from a March 1979 live performance of the song "City of Tiny Lights". Another March 1979 guitar solo from "City of Tiny Lights" is incorporated into the song "Outside Now" using the same recording technique. "Packard Goose", which Zappa wrote sometime in 1975, also uses xenochrony, with its guitar solo taken from a March 1979 performance of "Easy Meat".

The album concludes with a long guitar instrumental, "Watermelon in Easter Hay", the only guitar solo recorded for the album, in 9/4 time; every other guitar solo on the album was xenochronous—overdubbed from older live recordings. In their review of the album, Down Beat magazine criticized the song, but subsequent reviewers have championed the song as Zappa's masterpiece. Lowe called it the "crowning achievement of the album" and "one of the most gorgeous pieces of music ever produced". Zappa told Neil Slaven that he thought it was "the best song on the album". The song's title is thought to have come from a saying used by Zappa while recording the album: "Playing a guitar solo with this band is like trying to grow watermelon in Easter hay". After Zappa died, "Watermelon in Easter Hay" became known as one of his signature songs, and his son, Dweezil Zappa, later referred to it as "the best solo Zappa ever played".

The song is followed by "A Little Green Rosetta", a song that was originally intended to appear on Zappa's shelved Läther album, but rerecorded with different lyrics for Joe's Garage.

==== Guitar solo sources ====
All dates occurred in 1979.

Song	Source	Notes
Toad-O Line/On the Bus	March 21st, Rhein-Neckar-Halle, Eppelheim, Germany	extracted from "Inca Roads" (source also appears on One Shot Deal as "Occam's Razor")
Keep It Greasy	March 31st (late show), Rudi-Sedlmayer Sporthalle, Munich, Germany	first section extracted from "City of Tiny Lites" (source also appears on Guitar as "Outside Now (Original Solo)")
Keep It Greasy	March 31st (early show), Rudi-Sedlmayer Sporthalle, Munich, Germany	second section extracted from "City of Tiny Lites"
Outside Now	March 31st (early show), Rudi-Sedlmayer Sporthalle, Munich, Germany	second solo extracted from "City of Tiny Lites"
Outside Now	April 1st, Hallenstadion, Zurich, Switzerland	first solo extracted from "City of Tiny Lites"
Packard Goose	April 1st, Hallenstadion, Zurich, Switzerland	first section extracted from "Easy Meat"
Packard Goose	March 27th (late show), Rhein-Main-Halle, Wiesbaden, Germany	second section extracted from opening solo ("Persona Non Grata")
He Used to Cut the Grass	March 23rd, Liebenau Station, Graz, Austria	extracted from opening solo ("Persona Non Grata")

== Release ==
Joe's Garage Acts II & III was released in November 1979, with cover art depicting a makeup artist applying makeup to Zappa's face.

Joe's Garage was initially released in separate units, beginning with the single LP Act I in September 1979. For the album artwork, Zappa was photographed in black makeup, holding a mop for the car grease garage theme. The gatefold sleeve of Act I was designed by John Williams, and featured a collage, which included a naked Maya, vague technical drawings, pyramids and fingers on the fret of a guitar. The lyric insert featured similar illustrations, which related to the content of the songs and storyline. The title track was released as a single, with "The Central Scrutinizer" as its B-side. It did not chart.

Act I peaked at No. 27 on the Billboard Pop Albums chart. It was followed by the double album Acts II & III in November. The gatefold of Acts II & III featured collages taken from a medical journal, while the cover for Acts II & III featured a makeup artist applying makeup to Zappa's face. Acts II & III peaked at No. 53 on the Pop Albums chart.

Joe's Garage was reissued in 1987 as a triple album, combining Acts I, II & III into a single box set, and as a double album on compact disc. The song "Wet T-Shirt Nite" received two alternate titles, when the album was released on CD: the libretto referred to the song as "The Wet T-Shirt Contest", while the back cover referred to the song as "Fembot in a Wet T-Shirt". In an interview, Zappa explained that the "fembot" was the name given to a female robot in an episode of the TV series The Six Million Dollar Man. The instrumental "Toad-O Line" was renamed "On the Bus". The Central Scrutinizer monolog at the end of "Lucille Has Messed My Mind Up", which concludes the story's first act, was indexed as its own track on the CD reissue, under the title "Scrutinizer Postlude".

== Reception and legacy ==
Professional ratings
Review scores
Source	Rating
AllMusic	(Acts I, II & III) (Acts I) (Acts II & III)
Q	4/5 stars
Rolling Stone	4/5 stars
The Rolling Stone Album Guide	3/5 stars

AllMusic gave 3 out of 5 stars for the individual releases Act I and Acts II & III. William Ruhlmann wrote of Act I, "although his concern with government censorship would see a later flowering in his battles with the Parents Music Resource Center (PMRC), here he wasn't able to use it to fulfill a satisfying dramatic function." Ruhlmann also felt that Acts II & III "seems so thin and thrown together, musically and dramatically".

Don Shewey of Rolling Stone magazine wrote, "If the surface of this opera is cluttered with cheap gags and musical mishmash, its soul is located in profound existential sorrow. The guitar solos that Zappa plays in Joe's imagination burn with a desolate, devastating beauty. Flaws and all, Joe's Garage is Frank Zappa's Apocalypse Now." The collected Acts I, II & III release received 4.5 out of 5 stars from AllMusic's Steve Huey, who wrote "in spite of its flaws, Joe's Garage has enough substance to make it one of Zappa's most important '70s works and overall political statements, even if it's not focused enough to rank with his earliest Mothers of Invention masterpieces."

For his performance on Joe's Garage, Vinnie Colaiuta was named "the most technically advanced drummer ever" by Modern Drummer, which ranked the album as one of the top 25 greatest drumming performances of all time. On September 26, 2008, Joe's Garage was staged by the Open Fist Theatre Company in Los Angeles, in a production authorized by the Zappa Family Trust.

The cover was parodied by Swedish rockabilly artist Eddie Meduza on his 1980 album Garagetaper.

== Track listing ==
All tracks are written by Frank Zappa.

Act I Joe's Exploits
No.	Title	Length
1.	"The Central Scrutinizer"	3:27
2.	"Joe's Garage"	6:10
3.	"Catholic Girls"	4:26
4.	"Crew Slut"	5:51
Total length:		20:29

Sex and Side Gigs
No.	Title	Length
5.	"Wet T-Shirt Nite"	5:26
6.	"Toad-O Line"	4:18
7.	"Why Does It Hurt When I Pee?"	2:35
8.	"Lucille Has Messed My Mind Up"	7:17
Total length:		20:14

Act II The Closet
No.	Title	Length
1.	"A Token of My Extreme"	5:28
2.	"Stick It Out"	4:33
3.	"Sy Borg"	8:50
Total length:		19:34

Prison
No.	Title	Length
4.	"Dong Work for Yuda"	5:03
5.	"Keep It Greasey"	8:22
6.	"Outside Now"	5:52
Total length:		19:44

Act III Dystopian Society
No.	Title	Length
1.	"He Used to Cut the Grass"	8:34
2.	"Packard Goose"	11:38
Total length:		20:41

Imaginary Guitar Notes
No.	Title	Length
3.	"Watermelon in Easter Hay"	9:08
4.	"A Little Green Rosetta"	8:17
Total length:		17:25

Disc one
No.	Title	Length
1.	"The Central Scrutinizer"	3:27
2.	"Joe's Garage"	6:10
3.	"Catholic Girls"	4:26
4.	"Crew Slut"	5:51
5.	"Fembot in a Wet T-Shirt"	5:26
6.	"On the Bus"	4:18
7.	"Why Does It Hurt When I Pee?"	2:35
8.	"Lucille Has Messed My Mind Up"	5:43
9.	"Scrutinizer Postlude"	1:35
10.	"A Token of My Extreme"	5:28
11.	"Stick It Out"	4:33
12.	"Sy Borg"	8:50

Disc two
No.	Title	Length
1.	"Dong Work for Yuda"	5:03
2.	"Keep It Greasey"	8:22
3.	"Outside Now"	5:52
4.	"He Used to Cut the Grass"	8:34
5.	"Packard Goose"	11:38
6.	"Watermelon in Easter Hay"	9:09
7.	"A Little Green Rosetta"	8:15
Total length:		115:14

== Personnel ==
=== Musicians ===
- Frank Zappa – lead guitar, vocals
- Warren Cuccurullo – rhythm guitar, vocals, sitar
- Denny Walley – slide guitar, vocals
- Ike Willis – lead vocals
- Peter Wolf – keyboards
- Tommy Mars – keyboards (Act 1)
- Arthur Barrow – bass guitar, guitar (on "Joe's Garage"), vocals
- Patrick O'Hearn – bass guitar on "Outside Now" and "He Used to Cut the Grass"
- Ed Mann – percussion, vocals
- Vinnie Colaiuta – drums, combustible vapors, optometric abandon
- Jeff (Jeff Hollie) – tenor sax (all tracks Act 1)
- Marginal Chagrin (Earle Dumler) – baritone sax (all tracks Act 1)
- Stumuk (Bill Nugent) – bass sax (all tracks Act 1)
- Dale Bozzio – vocals (Acts 1 & 3)
- Al Malkin – vocals (all tracks Act 1)
- Craig Steward – harmonica (all tracks Act 1)

=== Cast ===
- Frank Zappa – Central Scrutinizer, Larry, L. Ron Hoover, Father Riley and Buddy Jones
- Ike Willis – Joe
- Dale Bozzio – Mary
- Denny Walley – Mrs. Borg
- Al Malkin – Officer Butzis
- Warren Cuccurullo and Ed Mann – Sy Borg
- Terry Bozzio – Bald-Headed John
- The Utility Muffin Research Kitchen Chorus – Al Malkin, Warren Cucurullo, Dale Bozzio, Geordie Hormel, Barbara Issak and most of the people who work at Village Recorders

=== Production staff ===
- Ferenc Dobronyi – cover design
- Steve Alsberg – project coordinator
- Joe Chiccarelli – engineer, mixing, recording
- Norman Seeff – photography, cover photo
- John Williams – artwork
- Steve Nye – remixing
- Mick Glossop – remixing
- Stan Ricker – mastering
- Jack Hunt – mastering
- Thomas Nordegg – assistant
- Tom Cummings – assistant

== Charts ==
Chart (1979)	Peak position
United States (Billboard 200)	27
Australia (Kent Music Report)	94
Canadian Albums (RPM) (Act I)	16
Canadian Albums (RPM) (Act II & III)	39

=== Year-end charts ===
Chart (1979)	Position
Canadian Albums (RPM)	98
