= Selected Memories from the Haunted Ballroom =

Studio album by the Caretaker
- Released: 1 September 1999
- Recorded: 1997–1999
- Genres: Ambient; big band; choral; dark ambient; drone; experimental; hauntology; industrial; noise; plunderphonics
- Length: 74:20
- Label: V/Vm Test
- Producer: Leyland Kirby

Leyland Kirby chronology
Selected Memories from the Haunted Ballroom (1999)	Sick-Love (2000)

The Caretaker chronology
Selected Memories from the Haunted Ballroom (1999)	A Stairway to the Stars (2001/2002)

Selected Memories from the Haunted Ballroom is the debut studio album by the Caretaker, an alias of musician Leyland Kirby. Released in 1999, it consists of an influence from the horror film The Shining, manipulating songs from the 1920s to resemble the film's music. It differed from Kirby's earlier works in that it did not manipulate pop songs to create noise albums, as he did under the V/Vm alias. It rather slowed down big band records to create a hauntological atmosphere. However, the packaging was the same as other V/Vm releases. The album was met with positivity from music critics, who praised its hauntological themes.

== Background ==
In the late 1990s, English musician Leyland Kirby started recording as V/Vm, releasing noise albums sampled from pop songs. Controversial aspects, such as copyright concerns and recordings of pigs feeding, were a prominent part of the alias. The alias was prolific, releasing in vinyl and CD on limited numbers. In 1997, Kirby started working in a new project, with only a turntable and effects at his disposal. In 1999, inspired by the haunted ballroom scene from the horror film The Shining, Kirby released Selected Memories from the Haunted Ballroom. Contrary to other releases, it was under the Caretaker alias, which was named after one of the film's characters. The pseudonym started with the exploration of nostalgia but would later shift into themes of memory and its deterioration. This started with Theoretically Pure Anterograde Amnesia (2005), which explored the disorder of same name. The Caretaker's breakthrough album, An Empty Bliss Beyond This World (2011) was inspired by a study about Alzheimer's disease. Kirby's final release under the alias, Everywhere at the End of Time (2016–2019) is a depiction of the stages of dementia. It uses the track "Friends past reunited" which is a much more clear version of the track on a stairway to the stars. Though the original piece used in "Friends past reunited" has been identified, being the aria "Lasst mich ihn nur noch einmal küssen" from St Luke Passion, BWV 246, the exact performance used for the sample remains unknown, and an ongoing effort exists to identify it.

== Composition and style ==
"You and the night"
"You and the night", a track that features distorted instruments and vocals.

"September 1939"
One of several noise tracks of the record, "September 1939" references the invasion of Poland.

Selected Memories from the Haunted Ballroom samples records from the 1920s and manipulates them to resemble the music from The Shining. The Caretaker's debut album, it explores ambient, noise, choral, dark ambient, drone, industrial, big band, and experimental music. The record is more noise-orientated than later Caretaker releases, often bearing resemblance to Kirby's work as V/Vm. The tracks feature aspects such as vocals filtered through reverberation and vinyl crackle, with an effect of hauntology. The original samples are slowed down, distorted, and echoed for an intent of creating a disorientation to the listener, with layers applied akin to films by David Lynch. It incorporates feelings of melancholy by time stretching waltzes and voices. Selected Memories from the Haunted Ballroom has a much more prominent hauntological influence than other Caretaker records. Along with releases by the Caretaker such as A Stairway to the Stars and Persistent Repetition of Phrases, it remains as one of his most prominent ambient records. It is part of the Caretaker's haunted ballroom trilogy, spanning Selected Memories from the Haunted Ballroom, A Stairway to the Stars, and We'll All Go Riding on a Rainbow. Sampled artists include Krzysztof Penderecki and Al Bowlly. Writer Adam Parkinson cited the album as a "sonic crystal, as the 'actual' music co-exists in close circuits with its 'virtual' counterpart, and we are listening to both a 'presence' and an 'absence'."

Noise tracks include "One thousand memories", "Den of iniquity", and "September 1939", the last referencing the invasion of Poland. They have a style akin to Japanese musician Merzbow. Many vocal tracks distort the voices so the lyrics are somewhat unrecognizable. Some tracks resemble a hissing sound, like in The Disintegration Loops by avant-garde composer William Basinski. Vocal tracks include "Haunting Me", "Dream Waltz", "From out of nowhere", "Friends past reunited" and "Thanks", whereby vocals and, in occasion, choirs, start panning. Other vocal tracks such as "In the dark" and "You and the night" have two vocals at different pitches creating the impression that there is a child accompanying the main singer; another track, "In days of old" has dramatic pitch changes throughout the song. "By The Seaside", while presenting a more coherent structure, has metallic screeches accompanying the instrumentals, rising and falling as the song progresses. The record ends with "Midnight, the stars and you", the song used in the ending credits for The Shining.

== Packaging and release ==
Selected Memories from the Haunted Ballroom was released after V/Vm's double CD AuralOffalWaffleTenPintsOfBitterAndABagOfPorkScratchings. Before AuralOffalWaffle, there have been several releases on vinyl records at the alias' record label, V/Vm Test. The packaging came in a zipped bag with photocopied paper inserts, akin to AuralOffalWaffle. Selected Memories from the Haunted Ballroom was released on 1 September 1999.

== Reception ==
Professional ratings
Review scores
Source	Rating
AllMusic	4/5 stars
Musique Machine	4/5 stars

Selected Memories from the Haunted Ballroom was praised due to its hauntological style. Brainwashed's critic Mark Weddle noted the album's simultaneous "a bit disturbing, a bit humorous and a bit beautiful" feel as "Loads of fun!". He noted its noise tracks as having sounds "that would make Merzbow jealous." Duncan Simpson, writing for Musique Machine, felt the record's "unique listening experience [...] is just the trick" for fans of dark ambient/industrial music. The A.V. Club's Seal O'Neal stated Kirby's work at depicting memories as "the ghosts that torment us" was "like listening to death itself." According to writer Corey Seymour from magazine Vogue, the title Selected Memories from the Haunted Ballroom "goes a long way in describing the music."

== Track listing ==
Adapted from Bandcamp and Brainwashed. The CD version features an interval between "Reckless Night" and "Thronged with Ghosts".

Selected Memories from the Haunted Ballroom track listing
No.	Title	Length
1.	"The Haunted Ballroom (1)"	3:44
2.	"By the Seaside"	4:00
3.	"One Thousand Memories"	1:25
4.	"Haunting Me"	3:48
5.	"A Summer Romance"	3:05
6.	"Den of Iniquity"	2:45
7.	"Dream Waltz"	3:29
8.	"A Handful of Stars"	3:34
9.	"Request Dance"	5:09
10.	"In the Dark"	3:02
11.	"Reckless Night"	3:02
12.	"Thronged with Ghosts"	3:48
13.	"From Out of Nowhere"	3:45
14.	"Friends Past Reunited"	2:00
15.	"You and the Night"	3:12
16.	"Moonlight Serenade"	2:34
17.	"Disillusioned"	2:41
18.	"The Revolving Bandstand"	0:47
19.	"Garden of Weeds"	3:06
20.	"'Excuse Me' for Ladies"	0:59
21.	"In Days of Old"	2:14
22.	"September 1939"	1:57
23.	"Thanks"	3:25
24.	"The Haunted Ballroom (2)"	3:20
25.	"Midnight, the Stars and You" (untitled on the CD release)	3:29
Total length:		74:20
