= A Stairway to the Stars =

Studio album by the Caretaker
- Released: 10 January 2001
- Genres: Ambient; choral; darkwave; drone; experimental; hauntology; noise; plunderphonics
- Length: 49:55
- Label: V/Vm Test
- Producer: Leyland Kirby

The Caretaker chronology
Selected Memories from the Haunted Ballroom (1999)	A Stairway to the Stars (2001)	We'll All Go Riding on a Rainbow (2003)

A Stairway to the Stars (stylized as "A stairway to the stars" and commonly shortened to ASTTS) is the second studio album by the Caretaker, an alias of musician Leyland Kirby. Released in 2001, it was created after one of Kirby's pop manipulations as V/Vm gained attention. Following Selected Memories from the Haunted Ballroom, A Stairway to the Stars features new genres such as darkwave and elements such as reversed vocals. The record was met with positivity from music critics, who praised its ambiance. It is regarded as Kirby's best album in his haunted ballroom trilogy, which spans his first three releases.

== Background ==
In 1999, English musician Leyland Kirby released the record Selected Memories from the Haunted Ballroom, inspired by a scene from the horror film The Shining. Kirby was previously known for his work under the V/Vm alias, whereby he manipulated pop songs in controversial ways. The controversy included various copyright violations, uncommon recordings, and noise releases made from samples. In the year of 2000, Kirby created a distorted version of "The Lady in Red" by English Chris de Burgh, which NME would feature as single of the week in September 2000. One of the tracks in A Stairway to the Stars would later be used in the last track of Kirby's final project as the Caretaker, Everywhere at the End of Time.

== Composition and style ==
"Robins and roses"
18-second sample of "Robins and roses", where a voice singing in reverse can be heard.

A Stairway to the Stars explores ambient, darkwave, plunderphonics, experimental, drone, choral, and dark ambient. It consists of ballroom 78-rpm records released between the 1920s and the 1940s, which are slowed down, distorted, and reverberated to produce an ambient sound. Its transformation of the basic source material is akin to the ones of the bands Skinny Puppy and Will, as well as to those of artists from the Cold Meat Industry record label. It implemented on the haunted ballroom themes of Selected Memories from the Haunted Ballroom. Part of the haunted ballroom trilogy, it succeeds Selected Memories from the Haunted Ballroom and precedes We'll All Go Riding on a Rainbow. Its track titles, such as "Malign forces of the occult", contrast with the light names from Selected Memories from the Haunted Ballroom, such as "By the seaside".

The opening track, "We cannot escape the past", intends to produce an eerie feel that is emphasized by the rest of the album and its title. Along with "Emptiness", they encapsulate the record's hauntological style, depicting the atmosphere of an empty ballroom. The first vocal track, "Cloudy, since you went away" makes the album's hauntology more unexpressed, with its horn creating a more lethargic sound. The track's sound is obscured by several noise layers. "Robins and roses" features a reversed melody, changing pitch differences. Nearing the album's end, "Each today doesn't lead to a tomorrow" features a gothic production, with a melody that is often interrupted by a reverberating bassline. "Home" and its distorted vocals are followed by a choral in "Friends past re-united", a recurring track in the project with vague production elements applied to the latter, which is presented in full in A Stairway to the Stars, as opposed to the truncated version featured in the preceding album, Selected Memories from the Haunted Ballroom. The album ends with the title track, which features a minimalistic organ in its sound.

=== Release ===
A Stairway to the Stars was released on 10 January 2001. On 19 February 2009, Kirby released music videos for the tracks "Emptiness" and "Friends past re-united" on his vvmtest YouTube channel. Both featured photo collages by used Drakulady. When some of his audience asked Kirby if he could reissue A Stairway to the Stars or We'll All Go Riding on a Rainbow, Kirby said: "I just need to work out what and when." Kirby was being asked by various filmmakers whether he could produce soundtracks for them, as the Caretaker's music was seen as fitting for horror movies at the time.

== Critical reception ==
A Stairway to the Stars was critically acclaimed, with praise being most directed to its ambiance. Olli Siebelt of BBC Music described the record as "a truly wonderful little gem that will have you dancing in the haunted ballroom, over and over again." Writing for A Closer Listen in 2013, Zachary Corsa interpreted the album as the result of "an era of smartphone obsessions and fear-strewn media overload," where "we should all be so haunted by the past and its implications." Shanshee_allures, critic of Julian Cope's Unsung, said it is the best of the haunted ballroom trilogy, "although it will take a few listens to appreciate just how it works as a piece." He concluded, "Once you’ve cracked it, it just might turn out to be one of the most fascinating, unfathomably wonderful creations you have ever heard." Musique Machine's Justin Faase affirmed the record was one of the best dark ambient releases of the time, surpassing record labels such as Cold Meat Industry. The album is regarded as Kirby's best album of his haunted ballroom trilogy. Along with Selected Memories from the Haunted Ballroom and Persistent Repetition of Phrases, A Stairway to the Stars is one of Kirby's most praised early records as the Caretaker.

== Track listing ==
Adapted from Bandcamp.

A Stairway to the Stars track listing
No.	Title	Length
1.	"We cannot escape the past"	2:03
2.	"Cloudy, since you went away"	4:12
3.	"Emptiness"	3:49
4.	"Consigned to a yesterday"	5:13
5.	"Masquerade ball"	4:01
6.	"Malign forces of the occult"	3:20
7.	"On the edge of breakdown"	2:06
8.	"Robins and roses"	3:02
9.	"Date with an angel"	3:10
10.	"It's all forgotten now"	3:03
11.	"Each today doesn't lead to a tomorrow"	1:50
12.	"Home"	2:06
13.	"Friends past re-united"	4:47
14.	"A stairway to the stars"	7:13
Total length:		49:55

== Personnel ==
- Leyland Kirby – producer
- Drakulady – music videos
