= The Caretaker (musician) =

English ambient music project

- Also known as: Leyland James Kirby; V/Vm; The Stranger
- Born: James Leyland Kirby; 9 May 1974 (age 52); Stockport, England
- Genres: Experimental; ambient; ballroom; hauntology; plunderphonics; sampledelia
- Instruments: Turntables; sampler
- Years active: 1999–2019 (as the Caretaker); 1996–present (solo career)
- Labels: V/Vm Test; History Always Favours the Winners
- Website: thecaretaker.com

James Leyland Kirby (born 9 May 1974), known professionally as The Caretaker, is an English ambient musician. His work as the Caretaker is characterized by exploring memory and its gradual deterioration, nostalgia, and melancholy. The project was initially inspired by the haunted ballroom scene in the 1980 film The Shining, the 1978 TV show Pennies from Heaven, and the 1962 film Carnival of Souls. His first several releases comprised treated and manipulated samples of 1930s ballroom pop recordings. Most of his album covers were painted by his friend, Ivan Seal.

The Caretaker's works have received critical acclaim in publications such as The Wire, The New York Times, and BBC Music.

== Career ==
=== 1999–2003: Haunted Ballroom trilogy ===
Simon Reynolds refers to the Caretaker's first three releases as "the haunted ballroom trilogy", spanning 1999–2003: Selected Memories from the Haunted Ballroom, A Stairway to the Stars, and We'll All Go Riding on a Rainbow.

Jon Fletcher described the sound as

"instantly recognizable musical identity of British tea-room pop (dance-band and swing music from the 1920s, 1930s and 1940s) plugged into a multitude of effects to create a Proustian Replicant inverse. It's a stranger's past relocated within your own memories, a re-imagined history from an alien past. The mannered romantic swing of a bygone era is rendered beguilingly uncanny. These first releases flitted from bursts of noise (September 1939) to gaseous ambiance (We Cannot Escape The Past) to subtly-soaked moments of outright beauty (Stardust). Despite the uncanny effect and the eeriness, there is something warmly seductive about this debut triptych. Kubrick's film, like the best horror, still injects a thrill and is a remnant of comfort in being haunted, a strange warmth. These early forays have the allure you find in childhood ghost stories. By the time of the third release though, it was hard to imagine what more could be done with the project. Never less than beautiful, it was just hard to conceive of actually needing any more of it."

=== 2005–2008: Amnesia period ===
Theoretically Pure Anterograde Amnesia was released in 2005 as a series of 72 free MP3 downloads. The release found much critical acclaim. Reynolds identifies it as a shift in the sound, "disorienting in its scale and abstraction", with his period 2005-2008 "exploring similar zones of queasy amorphousness". Doran also sees the album as "a change in direction for the project conceptually, as it started to explore different aspects of memory loss as the music itself became more texturally and structurally complex."

Jon Fletcher describes the release as "the labyrinthian set is a k-hole for the mind. Vague clouds of noise, barely flickering signals of life, only the starkest traces of past romanticism (no matter how poignant)- nothing to cling onto." Mark Fisher contrasts this album with the Caretaker's previous output: "If his earlier records suggested spaces that were mildewed but still magnificent - grand hotels have gone to seed, long-abandoned ballrooms - Theoretically Pure Anterograde Amnesia invokes sites that have deteriorated into total dereliction, where every unidentified noise is pregnant with menace."

Persistent Repetition of Phrases combines an overt interest in amnesia and memory distortion, with a more melodic piano-centered atmosphere, with fewer recognizable samples than the Haunted Ballroom period: "After a few minutes you realize that something is stuck...Each song is tightly looped, a single event, chasing its resignation. No development, no narrative, no story. Not every locked groove is entirely hopeless. Rosy retrospection fixates on an event with a sense of less-bereft nostalgia - the memory trap seemingly resting on a happy moment." Kirby described it as "a lot warmer and more gentle...Not all memories are necessarily bad or disturbing memories". At the time, this album was seen as his masterpiece, with Kirby describing himself as "surprised" by the level of reception, as it was created in a "bleak" and difficult period of his life.

=== 2011: Breakthrough and An Empty Bliss Beyond This World ===
After 2008, the Caretaker's website announced that "work has begun on a new release for early 2010 which will shift focus completely towards the brain and brain function, recall and error". During this time, Kirby released Sadly, the Future Is No Longer What It Was under his name, which was described by Pitchfork as "music of stasis that doesn't announce itself as much as it seeps."

Kirby's focus at this time was on another album, and did not plan out making another Caretaker record of this kind - the album was made because of "pure chance in action at all times". The critical impact of An Empty Bliss Beyond This World is explored in detail on its page.

He also completed the soundtrack for Grant Gee's film Patience (After Sebald) (2012) during this period. Kirby's score for the film uses a 1927 record of Franz Schubert's piano-and-voice-only composition Winterreise (1828) as its main audio source. It also differs from other works of the project where hissing sounds are used instead of crackles, the loops are shorter in length, and the non-musical aspects of each track (the hiss sounds) serve as the foreground of the mix.

=== 2016–2019: Everywhere at the End of Time ===
After another break, the Caretaker returned with his final project, intended as an end to the Caretaker persona. He conceived of six interlinked releases, which would explore the progression of dementia stage by stage to its end. Later stages reprise loops and motifs from both earlier albums in the series, and from throughout the Caretaker's back catalogue. To immerse listeners, Kirby released each album 6 months apart.

Kirby has always been driven by innovation and frustration with his past, saying "I can't carry on for another ten years looping old 1920s music" and seeking to make a final break, and expressing a quixotic desire to frustrate fans of his earlier work, describing them as "a certain type of listener who will be buying this for a particular type of sound". Everywhere at the End of Time is also influenced by technological changes since 1999, most notably advances in recording and mixing technology, and the new opportunities of sourcing music cuts online rather than scavenging in a physical record store.

Everywhere at the End of Time was released to wide critical acclaim.

In 2017, Kirby released Take Care. It's a Desert Out There..., following the suicide of his collaborator Mark Fisher, who was suffering from depression. It features a single track in its 48-minute runtime, with previously unreleased music by the Caretaker. Kirby's initial intention would be to give Take Care for people attending at his performance at the Barbican Hall in London. However, its high demand caused him to share it on the internet. Released in a CD, it included a message stating its proceeds would be donated to the mental health charity Mind.

Kirby's last work as the Caretaker, released alongside 2019's Stage 6, is Everywhere, an Empty Bliss, a collection of unreleased archival works.

== Influences ==
The Caretaker describes himself as "fascinated by memory and its recall", as well as suggesting the project is "a kind of audio black comedy". As well as The Shining, The Caretaker names Dennis Potter's Pennies from Heaven as an influence, which also appropriates music of the era in a new way with a "sadness in the lyrics to keep telling the story", as well as Carnival of Souls (1962) and the music itself:

"Most of that music is about ghosts and loss as it was recorded between both the world wars. it's of a totally different era and has more or less been forgotten. Titles inspired new ideas as did the audio itself"

He cites Al Bowlly specifically, whose music is featured prominently in The Shining, as a key touchstone:

"He was the golden voice of his generation, but he was killed by a parachute mine outside his London home. Bowlly always sang as if haunted; his voice was otherworldly. It's very strange music from this time between the two world wars: optimistic, but also very much about loss and longing, ghosts and torment. It seems haunted by the spirits of those who went to the trenches and never returned"

For his work on amnesia and dementia, he also drew from books and research on the topic.

The Caretaker's original website suggested it to "fans of the darker isolationist ambient work of modern composers such as William Basinski, Nurse with Wound, Aphex Twin, Fennesz and Brian Eno". Fisher notes that the project is "rooted in Britishness", with the Caretaker generally choosing to focus on only British source material. Fletcher suggests "Roxy Music's early weirdness".

The Caretaker sees his work as a collaborative process, stressing the importance of LUPO's mastering, the visuals of weirdcore.tv, and the work of artists Ivan Seal, Guy Denning, and Andrew Cliff as a key part of his process. Theorist Mark Fisher had a symbiotic relationship with the Caretaker, contributing the liner notes to Theoretically Pure Antiretrograde Amnesia as well as putting his work in critical context, often taking the Caretaker as a jumping off point for his political ideas. Following Fisher's death, the Caretaker released Take Care, It's a Desert Out There as a memorial album, after one of the writer's quotes, with proceeds going to the mental health charity Mind.

== Critical response ==
Mark Fisher played a major role in theorizing the Caretaker's sound. He names the Caretaker as a key hauntology artist, alongside "William Basinski, the Ghost Box label...Burial, Mordant Music, Philip Jeck, amongst others" who had "converged on a certain terrain without directly influencing one another...suffused with an overwhelming melancholy; and they were preoccupied with how technology materialized memory" - in the Caretaker's case, that of vinyl records. He identifies the "crackle" of vinyl as "the principal sonic signature of hauntology" which "makes us aware that we are listening to a time that is out of joint", signaling "the return of a certain sense of loss" which "invokes the past and marks our distance from it". Fisher connects the Caretaker's sound to his wider project of describing capitalist realism - the political idea that "not only has the future not arrived, it no longer seems possible", and hauntology's melancholia to capitalist realism's "closed horizons". Fisher contributed liner notes to Theoretically Pure Anterograde Amnesia, describing it as "uneasy listening"; in contrast to the Caretaker's earlier works, "the threat is no longer the deadly sweet seduction of nostalgia. The problem is not, anymore, the longing to get *to* the past but the inability to get *out* of it".

Jon Fletcher similarly describes his work as "a hideously clear analysis of the post-modern condition - the sheer ephemerality of contemporary culture degenerating into a hopelessness - a sickness so debilitating that we forget the moment while it is still taking place…"

Kirby's press releases also welcome political understandings of his work. With British-born Kirby having lived and worked for many years in Berlin and Kraków, the press release for Everywhere at the End of Time compares the project to Brexit: "Both started in 2016 and are due to wrap up in spring 2019. It should be no stretch of the imagination to read into their parallel progression from nostalgia and historic/collective amnesia, to progressive dementia and complete obliteration of (the) sense(s)."

Adam Scovell focuses on the "spatial qualities" of Take Care, It's a Desert Out There - contrasting it with the Caretaker's earlier evocation of old tea rooms and hotels with "transporting the listener into a void of sorts". He describes it as "almost weather-like which is appropriate as depression is in some sense meteorological...Everything is dampened, nothing is spared. There is only the "now" when the weather is bad. Bones are damp, thoughts are damp and the dry land that others inhabit is seemingly inconceivable."

== Legacy ==
Jon Fletcher described the Caretaker as "one of this decade's most innovative, heartbreaking and downright eerie musical projects has been playing to shadows under dimmed lights for the past 12 years". Pitchfork described An Empty Bliss Beyond This World as "the musical equivalent of a permanent smile."

The Caretaker's final project, Everywhere at the End of Time, is amongst his best-known. The Quietus, who very frequently features Kirby's projects, named it at the top of its 100 Reissues list in 2019. In 2020, the completed Everywhere at the End of Time went viral on TikTok, with users telling one another to listen to the entire six-and-a-half-hour album series in one sitting.

Silvia Trevisson noted the connection of Everywhere at the End of Time with the internet creepypasta The Backrooms, due to the similar absurd states of mind that both projects possess. The track "All That Follows Is True" was featured in the Backrooms film adaptation, which released in 2026. Everywhere at the End of Time has also been connected to the aesthetics of liminal spaces and analog horror. Harry Nordlinger commented that the warped styles of analog horror and liminal spaces reflects upon Everywhere at the End of Time as such visuals form the zeitgeist of those who were born Millennials or Gen Z.

== The Caretaker discography ==
=== Albums ===
==== Studio albums ====
Title	Studio album details
Selected Memories from the Haunted Ballroom	Released: 1 September 1999; Label: V/Vm Test; Format: CD
A Stairway to the Stars	Released: 10 January 2001; Label: V/Vm Test; Format: CD, 2×LP
We'll All Go Riding on a Rainbow	Released: 1 July 2003; Label: V/Vm Test; Format: CD
Theoretically Pure Anterograde Amnesia	Released: December 2005; Label: V/Vm Test; Format: DL, 6×CD
Deleted Scenes / Forgotten Dreams	Released: 7 July 2007; Label: WéMè; Format: DL, 2×LP
Persistent Repetition of Phrases	Released: 1 April 2008; Label: Install/History Always Favours the Winners; Format: DL, CD, LP
An Empty Bliss Beyond This World	Released: 19 May 2011; Label: History Always Favours the Winners; Format: DL, CD, LP
Everywhere at the End of Time – Stage 1	Released: 22 September 2016; Label: History Always Favours the Winners; Format: DL, LP
Everywhere at the End of Time – Stage 2	Released: 6 April 2017; Label: History Always Favours the Winners; Format: DL, LP
Everywhere at the End of Time – Stage 3	Released: 28 September 2017; Label: History Always Favours the Winners; Format: DL, LP
Take Care. It's a Desert Out There...	Released: 8 December 2017; Label: History Always Favours the Winners; Format: CD
Everywhere at the End of Time – Stage 4	Released: 5 April 2018; Label: History Always Favours the Winners; Format: DL, 2×LP
Everywhere at the End of Time – Stage 5	Released: 20 September 2018; Label: History Always Favours the Winners; Format: DL, 2×LP
Everywhere at the End of Time – Stage 6	Released: 14 March 2019; Label: History Always Favours the Winners; Format: DL, 2×LP

==== Soundtrack albums ====
Title	Album details
Patience (After Sebald)	Released: 23 January 2012; Label: History Always Favours the Winners; Format: DL, LP

==== Compilation albums ====
Title	Album details
Additional Amnesiac Memories	Released: March 2006; Label: V/Vm Test; Format: DL
The Complete Digital Collection (1996-2008)	Released: 2009; Label: History Always Favours the Winners; Format: DL
Everywhere at the End of Time Stages 1–3	Released: 12 October 2017; Label: History Always Favours the Winners; Format: DL, 3xCD set, 3×LP set
Everywhere, an Empty Bliss	Released: 26 February 2019; Label: History Always Favours the Winners/FRAC Auverne; Format: DL, CD
Everywhere at the End of Time Stages 4–6	Released: 14 March 2019; Label: History Always Favours the Winners; Format: DL, 4xCD set, 6xLP set

==== Live albums ====
Title	Details	Notes
Recollected Memories from the Museum of Garden History	Released: 12 May 2008; Label: Vukzid; Format: DL	A one-track live album exclusively released for digital download on Vukzid. It consists of previously released tracks compiled for an event at the Museum of Garden History.

=== Extended plays ===
Title	EP details
Extra Patience (After Sebald)	Released: 15 February 2012; Label: History Always Favours the Winners; Format: DL

=== Mixes ===
- Recollections from old London town (Radio, Compilation, 2009)

Note

- The release Desolate Fragments Of Thought was cancelled

== Other releases ==
=== As Leyland Kirby ===
- Sadly, the Future Is No Longer What It Was (2009)
- Eager to Tear Apart the Stars (2011)
- Bonus Tracks 1 (Compilation, 2011)
- Breaks My Heart Each Time (EP, 2014)
- We Drink to Forget the Coming Storm (2014)
- The Death of Rave (A Partial Flashback) (2014)
- Intrigue & Stuff (Compilation, 2015)
- We, So Tired of All the Darkness in Our Lives (2017)
- We Are in the Shadow of a Distant Fire (2022)

=== As The Stranger ===
- The Stranger (1998)
- Bleaklow (2008)
- Watching Dead Empires in Decay (2013)
- Bleaklow (Remastered) (2014)
