= V/Vm =

- Born: James Leyland Kirby; 9 May 1974 (age 52)
- Origin: Stockport, England
- Genres: Experimental music; noise music; sound collage; plunderphonics; new beat (later)
- Occupation: Musician
- Instruments: Computer, sampler, turntable
- Years active: 1996–2008, 2016-2017, 2026
- Labels: V/Vm Test Records (1996-2008), History Always Favours The Winners (2016-2017)
- Website: Official website

V/Vm was an alias of English musician James Leyland Kirby, used for producing experimental music. Although starting out mainly in the style of noise music, most releases under the V/Vm alias were plunderphonics, with some original compositions. Most, but not all, of V/Vm's music was released under the V/Vm Test Records label. Alongside the work of the V/Vm project, Kirby also recorded as The Caretaker. He currently resides in Kraków.

== History ==
Leyland Kirby began producing music under the V/Vm alias in 1996, mostly under his own label, V/Vm Test Records. Early releases were electronic in nature, including a split 12" release on Fat Cat Records. In 1999, V/Vm released the EP Pig, consisting mostly of the sound of pigs feeding, which some critics mistook as the sound of pigs dying.

In 1998, V/Vm appeared on the cover of The Wire (October 1998, issue 176) under the banner "Harder! Faster! Louder!". The article explored a developing scene which also included Alec Empire, DJ Speedranch, Diskono, and Fat Cat Records.

The late 1990s saw V/Vm begin to produce music under the genre of plunderphonics, which was released in a manner which ignored copyright. At this time, V/Vm was in conversation with the artists spearheading the bootleg, plunderphonics, and mashup (a.k.a. bastard pop) genres. In 2000, V/Vm's plunderphonics single "The Lady in Red (Is Dancing With Meat)", which sampled Chris de Burgh's "The Lady in Red", achieved Single of the Week in the NME. "The Lady In Red (Is Dancing With Meat)" later appeared on V/Vm's 2000 album Sick-Love.

In 2003, V/Vm re-released "Relax", the seminal 1983 hit by Frankie Goes to Hollywood. In a reproduction of the original release, a double LP, a 7-inch picture disc, and a CD single were released, each featuring numerous remixes of "Relax." Within weeks of the release, V/Vm received legal threats, causing V/Vm to withdraw the release.

== V/Vm Test Records ==
From 1996 to 2008, Kirby ran the V/Vm Test Records label, which released records from About This Product, Goodiepal, Jansky Noise, and Fast Lady, among many other experimental musicians. The label used to give away free audio via the V/Vm Test Records website.

== Later projects ==
In 2005, Kirby recorded a remix of the Alphaville song Forever Young, which was going to be used in an advertisement by Sony for the PlayStation. While the advertisement was recorded, it never aired, due to a dispute with TBWA Worldwide. Although it never aired, the advertisement was leaked and uploaded to YouTube.

In 2006, he produced V/Vm 365, which he spent the whole year on. Kirby described V/Vm 365 as "The idea is basically to create and upload free audio for one whole year and leave a massive big mess behind, warts and all, for you to digest as you see fit." When it was finished, V/Vm 365 contained 603 audio tracks and six video tracks, with a total running time of 52 hours, 3 minutes and 57 seconds.

In 2007, Kirby was included in an exhibition in Madrid entitled "Ruidos, Silencios y la Transgresion Mordaz. De Fluxus al techno-noise"; the exhibit featured video and artwork by Kirby under the V/Vm alias, alongside Fluxus artists (Nam June Paik, Philip Corner, Wolf Vostell), and other contemporary artists and musicians (Ultra-red).

In 2008, Kirby released the album There Was A Fish...In...The Percolator. He would cease operating V/Vm Test Records in 2008, establishing History Always Favours The Winners in 2009.

In 2016, under the alias Mrs VVMills, Kirby released Between Nothingness and Eternity, a full remix of the Tim Hecker album Love Streams, with a MIDI version of the album being played through a virtual piano, as a tribute to British pianist and entertainer Mrs Mills. He later released The Christmess Stocking, the last full length album he would release under the V/Vm alias.

After releasing EPs under the alias in 2017, Kirby would cease to release any recorded material under the name, reviving the alias for a live performance at the inaugural Black Lights Festival in Blackpool in 2026.

== Discography ==
=== Selected releases ===
- Uplink Data Transmissions – V/Vm Test (1996)
- Fat Cat Split 12-inch – Fat Cat Records (1997)
- Machines – V/Vm Test (1999)
- Pig – V/Vm Test (1999)
- Auraloffalwaffle – V/Vm Test (1999)
- Lady in Red/All Night Long – V/Vm Test (2000)
- Sick Love – V/Vm Test (2000)
- Masters of the Absurd – V/Vm Test (2000)
- Snooker Loopy – V/Vm Test (2001)
- Helpaphextwin – V/Vm Test (2003)
- The Missing Symphony – V/Vm Test (2003)
- Stigma – V/Vm Test (2004)
- Sabam – The Sound of Belgium '89 – V/Vm Test (2006)
- White Death – V/Vm Test (2006)
- Vvmt365 – Daily Audio Downloads – V/Vm Test (2006)
- The Death of Rave – V/Vm Test (2006)

=== Revival releases under the vanity label V/Vm Test Records ===
- Between Nothingness & Eternity (under the alias Mrs VVMills) – History Always Favours The Winners (2016)
- The Christmess Stocking – History Always Favours The Winners (late 2016)

=== Compilation appearances ===
- "Cha-ha Meat Skran-r The 15lb. Turkey" on Brain in the Wire
- "Engulfer" on Brainwaves (2006)
- "Female Pig Herder" on Split Series 1–8
- "She Chokes Her Dying Breath and Does It in My Face" on Chicken Switch
