= Gilda Maiken =

American singer (1922–2001)

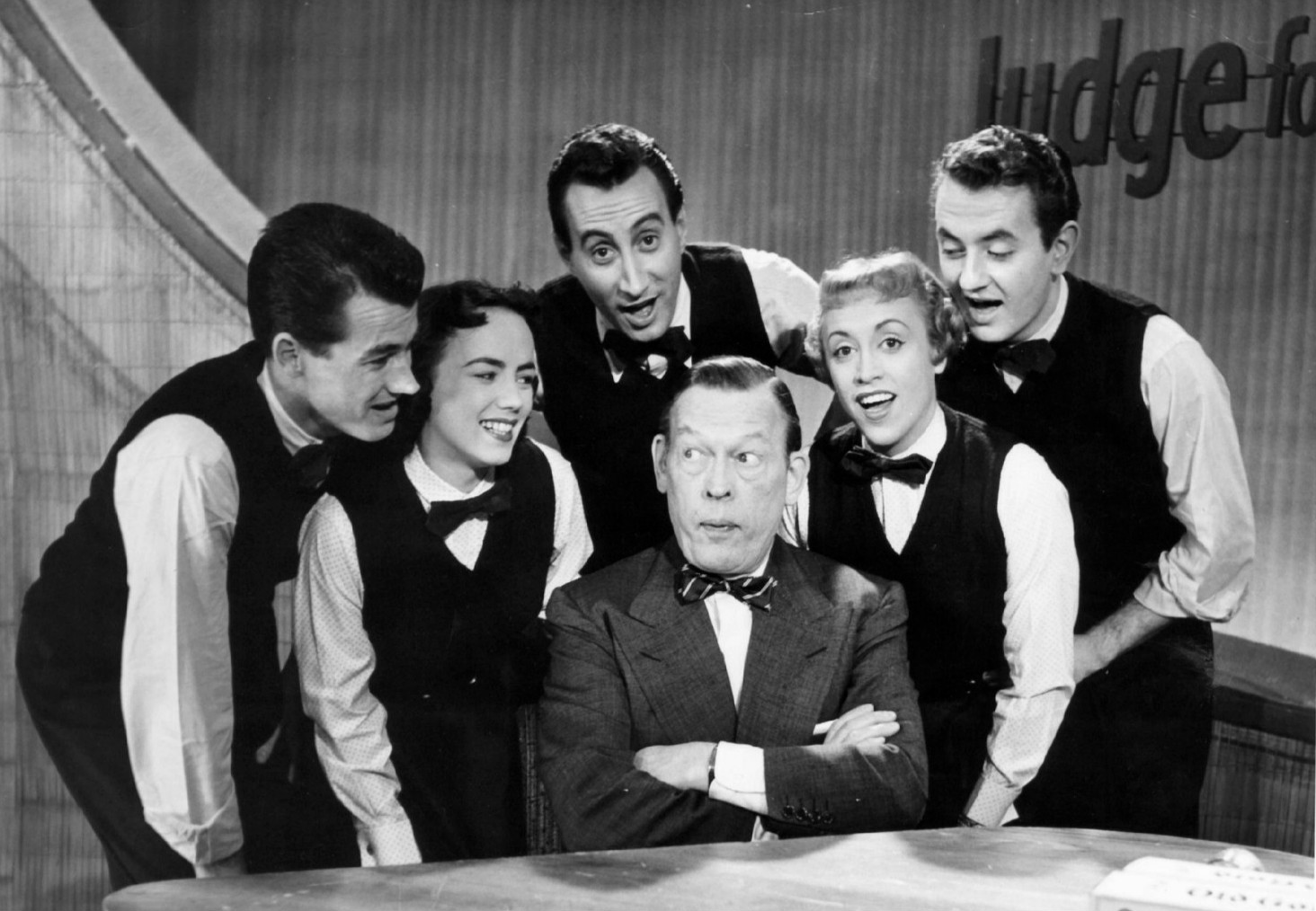
Gilda Maiken (second from right) with the Skylarks (and Fred Allen, seated)

Gilda D. Maiken (November 30, 1922 - October 14, 2001) was an American pop and jazz singer and charity executive. Her married name was Gilda Maiken Anderson.

Maiken is most known as the lead singer of The Skylarks. She joined the group in Detroit in its early days in the 1940s (they had heard her on WJR Radio) and remained with the group throughout its career, which stretched into the 1970s. With The Skylarks she backed Russ Morgan on his number one hits "Cruisin' Down the River" and "Forever and Ever", also backed singers such as Bing Crosby, Dinah Shore, Eddie Fisher, Danny Kaye, Jerry Lewis, Betty Hutton, Dean Martin, and Frank Sinatra, toured, and appeared on many TV variety shows.

Maiken provided the dubbed singing voice of Stella Stevens in the film Girls! Girls! Girls! (1962) on Stevens's songs ("Never Let Me Go", "The Nearness Of You" and "Baby, Baby, Baby"). She provided the dubbed singing voice for Marianne McAndrew's ensemble vocals in the film Hello, Dolly! (1969). She was the lead singer for the Merry Macs on some commercials.

Maiken later ran her own talent agency. She was a co-founder and founding chairman of the Society of Singers, a charity founded to help former professional singers who were ill, destitute, or otherwise in need (the organization later also provided scholarships for aspiring singers and sponsored the Ella Awards).
