= Connie & Clyde – Hit Songs of the 30s =

Studio album by Connie Francis
- Released: May 1968
- Recorded: May 6, 7, and 11, 1968
- Genre: Vocal jazz
- Labels: MGM Records; E-4573 (mono)/SE-4573(stereo)
- Producer: Don Costa

Connie Francis chronology
Hawaii Connie (1968)	Connie & Clyde – Hit Songs of the 30s (1968)	Connie Francis Sings Bacharach & David (1968)

Singles from Connie & Clyde – Hit Songs of the 30s
- 1. "Somebody Else Is Taking My Place" Released: August 1968 MGM Records K 13948; 2. "Brother, Can You Spare A Dime" Released: August 1968 MGM Records K 13948; 3. "Am I Blue" Released: November 1968 MGM Records K 14004

Connie & Clyde – Hit Songs of the 30s is a studio album recorded by U. S. Entertainer Connie Francis. While the LP didn't reach the album charts, it received a positive critical reception.

== Background and content ==
Allegedly inspired by the success of Arthur Penn's 1967 motion picture Bonnie & Clyde, Connie Francis decided in March 1968 to record an album of songs from the depression era. The selection of songs was made after interviewing several people about the hit songs from that era. Francis followed this project with enthusiasm, and within an unusual short preparation time of less than two months after the initial idea, the album was recorded on May 6, 7, and 11, 1968.

The album's title is a word play on the outlaw duo Bonnie and Clyde, two of the most remembered personalities of the era. Robert Arthur, the musical director of The Ed Sullivan Show, provided the only new song, the opening track "Connie & Clyde". Arrangements were provided by Don Costa, the live orchestra during the sessions was conducted by Joe Mazzu.

Two recordings on this album are especially noteworthy: Button Up Your Overcoat and You Oughta Be in Pictures were treated with a special mixing technique. The first bars of each song feature a nostalgic fake gramophone sound before bursting into glorious 1968 state of the art stereo. The mixing of all song was done immediately after the recording sessions in early May 1968, followed by the album's release at the end of the same month.

== Releases and cover ==
In Germany, the album was released in a slightly edited version: With Plenty Of Money And You was removed from the Golddiggers' Medley, so the recording starts immediately with We're In The Money. On the album cover, the song was renamed The Golddiggers' Song: We're In The Money.

For the photos on the album's cover, Connie Francis and an unnamed production assistant of MGM Records dressed up in fashionable 1930s style and reenacted the famous photo of Bonnie Parker and Clyde Barrow posing with guns in front of a Ford Model B of 1932.

The album would be Francis' second favorite that she recorded, with the song "Brother, Can You Spare A Dime" being the song that she loved to perform live the most.

== Critical reception ==
The album received a positive critical reception upon its release. The initial Record World magazine review said that "Still turned on by the Bonnie and Clyde notion, Connie uses the popularity of the pair as a reason for a trip down a 1930 memory lane. She sings 'You Oughta Be in Pictures,' 'Just a Gigolo,' 'Am I Blue?,' 'Brother, Can You Spare a Dime?'". They stated that "Gal cuts up on the jacket, too."

Cashbox reviewed the album in mid July and stated that Francis "has been a top performer for so long that it's almost easy to believe she was singing these hit songs of the Thirties when they first came out. Although references to personalities have been updated, the general treatment of the material retains a strong nostalgic sound which will appeal to many buyers of all ages." The publication noted that "'You Oughta Be In Pictures,' 'Just A Gigolo' and 'Am I Blue' are among the songs which get resurrected." They believed that it "Should fare nicely." Billboard said that "Connie Francis leads off with a clever title song which captures what teenagers think is the essence of the Thirties, then mixes straight singing with a bit of parody on the top tunes of the early FDR years."

== Track listing ==
Side one
No.	Title	Writer(s)	Length
1.	"Connie & Clyde"	Robert Arthur	2:56
2.	"You Oughta Be in Pictures"	Dana Suesse, Edward Heyman	2:14
3.	"Ace in the Hole"	James Dempsey, George Mitchell	3:11
4.	"Golddiggers Medley: With Plenty of Money and You / We're in the Money"	Harry Warren, Al Dubin	2:13
5.	"Just a Gigolo"	Leonello Casucci, Julius Brammer, Irving Caesar	3:33
6.	"Button Up Your Overcoat"	Ray Henderson, B. G. DeSylva, Lew Brown	1:56

Side two
No.	Title	Writer(s)	Length
7.	"Brother, Can You Spare a Dime"	Yip Harburg, Jay Gorney	3:48
8.	"Maybe"	Allan Flynn, Frank Madden	2:14
9.	"Am I Blue"	Harry Akst, Grant Clarke	3:01
10.	"Please Don't Talk About Me When I'm Gone"	Bee Palmer, Sam H. Stept, Sidney Clare	2:52
11.	"Ain't Misbehavin'"	Fats Waller, Harry Brooks, Andy Razaf	3:26
12.	"Somebody Else Is Taking My Place"	Dick Howard, Bob Ellsworth, Russ Morgan	2:32
