= Society of Singers =

American charitable organization

Society of Singers, (1984 – 2017), known as SOS, was an American nonprofit 501(c)3 charitable organization, the only one devoted exclusively to helping professional singers.

== History and programs ==
SOS was co-founded in 1984 by Ginny Mancini, widow of Academy Award-winning composer Henry Mancini, and Gilda Maiken Anderson and Donna (Fowler) Manners of the vocal group The Skylarks. Their aim was to help singers in need, as there is no union or guild that exclusively represents the rights of singers. It was the mission of SOS to benefit the health and welfare of professional singers by providing emergency assistance and other human services to those in acute financial need. Additionally, the SOS Vocal Arts Scholarship Program helped deserving students take their first step toward becoming professionals in the vocal arts. Tuition-based scholarships were granted to those pursuing master's degrees in Voice.

The SOS ceased active functioning in 2017.

== Funding ==
SOS was primarily funded by individual and corporate donations. SOS supporters included Barbra Streisand, Florence Henderson, Pat Boone, Elton John, and Barry Manilow. As a 501 (c)3 organization it was supported by tax-deductible contributions which helped SOS maintain its free and confidential programs.

== Ella Award and other events ==
From 1989 to 2014, the SOS's premier fundraising event was the ceremony awarding the Ella Award, named after its first recipient in 1989, Ella Fitzgerald. The last award was given in 2014 to Mike Love. The Ella Award was given to singers "...for their contribution to the world of music along with their dedicated efforts to benefit the community and worldwide causes". SOS held other events throughout the year to raise funds.

=== Recipients ===
- Ella Fitzgerald (1989)
- Frank Sinatra (1990)
- Tony Martin (1992)
- Peggy Lee (1994)
- Steve Lawrence and Eydie Gorme (1995)
- Lena Horne (1997)
- Rosemary Clooney (1998)
- Joe Williams (1999)
- Tony Bennett (2000)
- Tina Turner (2000)
- Julie Andrews (2001)
- Plácido Domingo (2002)
- Barry Manilow (2003)
- Celine Dion (2004)
- Elton John (2005)
- Johnny Mathis (2006)
- Gladys Knight (2007)
- Andy Williams (2008)
- Herb Alpert & Lani Hall (2009)
- Doris Day (2010)
- Smokey Robinson (2011)
- No award 2012 – 2013
- Mike Love (2014)
