= You're a Sweetheart =

1937 film

- Theatrical poster
- Directed by: David Butler
- Written by: Story: Maxwell Shane; Warren Wilson; William C. Thomas; Screenplay: Monte Brice; Charles Grayson
- Produced by: Buddy G. DeSylva
- Starring: Alice Faye; George Murphy; Ken Murray
- Cinematography: George Robinson
- Edited by: Bernard W. Burton
- Music by: Charles E. Henderson. Songs: Jimmy McHugh (music), Harold Adamson (lyrics)
- Production company: Universal Pictures
- Distributed by: Universal Pictures
- Release dates: December 26, 1937 (limited); January 7, 1938
- Running time: 96 minutes
- Country: United States
- Language: English
- Budget: $800,000

You're a Sweetheart is a 1937 American musical film directed by David Butler and starring Alice Faye, George Murphy and Ken Murray. It was produced and distributed by Universal Pictures who had Alice Faye on loan from 20th Century Fox to headline the film. It was remade in 1943 under the title Cowboy in Manhattan.

You're a Sweetheart was nominated for an Academy Award for Best Art Direction by Jack Otterson.

== Plot ==
A big and important Broadway theatre producer is opening his new big show. He is alarmed when he discovers his new show opens on the same night as a charity convention. He decides to lie about the tickets already being sold, so the show will be more alluring.

== Cast ==
- Alice Faye as Betty Bradley
- George Murphy as Hal Adams
- Ken Murray as Don King
- Charles Winninger as Cherokee Charlie
- Andy Devine as Daisy Day
- William Gargan as Fred Edwards
- Frank Jenks as Harry Howe
- Frances Hunt as Penny
- Tony Labriola as Oswald
- Casper Reardon as Cousin Caspar
- Donald Meek as Conway Jeeters
- David Oliver as Yes Man
- A.A. Trimble as Will Rogers
- Edna Sedgewick as Ballet Dancer
- Bob Murphy as Bailiff
- Renie Riano as Mrs. Hepplethwaite
- Wade Boteler as Cop
- Virginia Sale as Gawking Wife at Opening
- Constance Moore as Bit Role

== Production ==
Universal paid 20th Century Fox $40,000 to use Alice Faye plus $26,500 when filming was extended.

== Songs ==
- You're a Sweetheart (Jimmy McHugh, Harold Adamson)
- Broadway Jamboree (Jimmy McHugh, Harold Adamson)
- My Fine Feathered Friend (Jimmy McHugh, Harold Adamson)
- Who Killed Maggie? (Jimmy McHugh, Harold Adamson)
- Oh, Oh, Oklahoma (Jimmy McHugh, Harold Adamson)
- So It's Love (Mickey Bloom, Lou Bring, Arthur Quenzer)
- Scrapin' the Toast' (Murray Mencher (music), Charles Tobias (lyrics))
