= Stewart Moss =

American actor

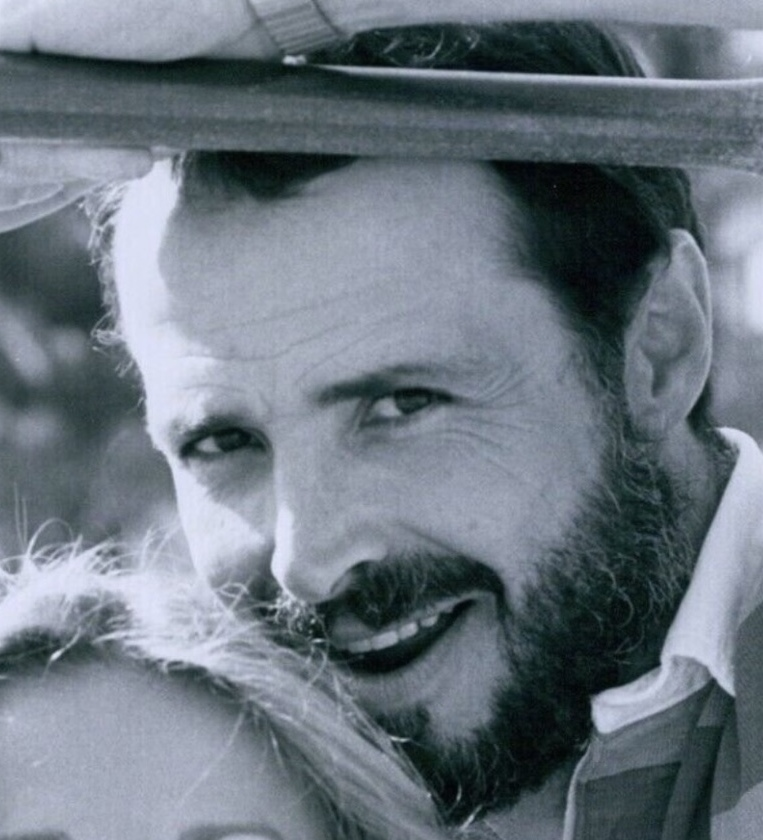
- Moss in Barnaby Jones, 1978
- Born: November 27, 1937; Chicago, Illinois, U.S.
- Died: September 13, 2017 (aged 79); Walla Walla, Washington, U.S.
- Education: Marquette University; Yale School of Drama
- Occupation: Actor
- Years active: 1964–1993
- Spouse: Marianne McAndrew (m. 1968)

Stewart Moss (November 27, 1937 – September 13, 2017) was an American actor, writer, and director.

== Early years ==
Moss was born in Chicago, Illinois, of Irish descent on his father's side and his mother was a daughter of immigrants from Italy. He graduated from Marquette University in 1959. Subsequently, he attended Yale School of Drama on a one-year scholarship.

== Career ==
On Broadway, Moss appeared in Seidman and Son (1962).

Moss's film credits included roles in In Harm's Way (1965) (his film debut), Chubasco (1968), Pendulum (1969), the Hitchcock movie Topaz (1969), Zig Zag (1970), Fuzz (1972), Stacey (1973), Doctor Death: Seeker of Souls (1973), The Bat People (1974), The Last Married Couple in America (1980) and Raise the Titanic (1980). He made eight guest appearances on Hogan's Heroes from 1965 to 1971. He also made two guest appearances on Perry Mason, first as murder victim David Cartwell in the 1964 episode, "The Case of the Paper Bullets," and Dan Swanson in "The Case of the Dead Ringer," in 1966 when star Raymond Burr doubled as Mason and murderer Grimes. Moss also appeared in two episodes of Star Trek: The Original Series: "The Naked Time" as Lt. Joe Tormolen, and "By Any Other Name" as Hanar. He appeared in the TV series The Invaders episode titled "Inquisition" as Hadley Jenkins (1968). He also appeared in such TV shows as Wheels, Murder, She Wrote, Hogan's Heroes, Matlock, Riptide, Cagney and Lacey, Magnum, P.I., Barnaby Jones, Baa Baa Black Sheep (in the episode "The Meatball Circus"), The Rockford Files, Cannon, Kojak, The Silent Force, Hawaii Five-O, and Bonanza. Moss appeared in two episodes of Cannon: the 1971 episode "Death Chain" as Don Woodard and the 1973 episode "Trial by Terror" as Ross Vernon.

In 1974, he appeared in the docudrama teleplay The Missiles of October, playing Kenneth O'Donnell, a special assistant to President John F. Kennedy.

In addition to acting, Moss also wrote and directed. He wrote an episode of Trapper John, M.D. called "Old Man Liver", and he directed a stage production of Sweet Charity starring Bebe Neuwirth. He won a Drama-Logue Award for directing the stage production of The Shadow Box at Theatre East.

== Marriage and death ==
In 1968, Moss married actress Marianne McAndrew and co-starred with her in the film The Bat People. Moss died in September 2017 at the age of 79.

== Autobiography ==
- Moss, Stewart (2014). My Trek. CreateSpace. ISBN 978-1500914233.

== Filmography ==
Year	Title	Role	Notes
1965	In Harm's Way	Ensign Balch	
1967	Chubasco	Les	
1969	Pendulum	Richard D'Angelo	
1969	Topaz	Devereaux's colleague in Havana	Uncredited
1970	Zig Zag	Edgar Courtland	
1972	Fuzz	Det. Hal Willis	
1973	Stacey	John Chambers	
1973	Doctor Death: Seeker of Souls	Greg Vaughn	
1974	The Bat People	Dr. John Beck	
1974	Live Again, Die Again	Wilson	ABC Movie of the Week
1974	The Tribe	Gato	ABC Movie of the Week
1980	The Last Married Couple in America	Donald	
1980	Raise the Titanic	Koplin	

== Television ==
Year	Title	Role	Notes
1965	Hogan's Heroes	Olsen	S1:E4, "The Late Inspector General"
1967	Hogan's Heroes	Olsen	S3:E2, "Some of Their Planes Are Missing"
1966	Star Trek: The Original Series	Lt. Joe Tormolen	S1:E4, "The Naked Time"
1968	Star Trek: The Original Series	Hanar	S2:E22, "By Any Other Name"
1969	Hawaii Five-O	Ned Horvath	S1:E22, "Not That Much Different"
1971-73	Cannon	David Rackham	3 episodes
1971	Dan August	Darryl York	S1:E20, "Trackdown"
1972	Cade's County	Jarvis	S1:E24, "The Witness"
1973-76	The Streets of San Francisco	Dr. Kevin Morely	2 episodes
1975-76	Fay	Dr. Elliott Baines	6 episodes
1976	Black Sheep Squadron	Lt. Cmdr. Hightower	Episode: "The Meatball Circus"
1976	The Practice	Dan Case	S1:E9, "The Nose"
1976-78	Barnaby Jones	Bill Wayland	2 episodes
1977	Kingston: Confidential	Ted Drew	S1:E2, "Eight Columns Across the Top"
1980	Beyond Westworld	Foley	S1:E1, "Westworld Destroyed"
1982	The Devlin Connection	Dr. Wade	S1:E13, "Jennifer"
1983	Cagney & Lacey	Joe Price	S2:E15, "Jane Doe #37"
1985	T. J. Hooker	Alan Hartman	S4:E17, "Hollywood Starr"
1988	Punky Brewster	Dr. Davis	S4:E14, "Ouch"
1986	Matlock	Lou Pearson	S1:E10, "The Angel"
1986	Remington Steele	Gerald Steinmetz	S4:E16, "Sensitive Steele"
1990	Generations	Judge Titus	10 episodes
1993	Murder, She Wrote	Dr. Abner Farrow	S9:E13, "Dead Eye"
