= The Bat People =

1974 film by Jerry Jameson

- Theatrical release poster
- Directed by: Jerry Jameson
- Written by: Lou Shaw
- Produced by: Lou Shaw
- Starring: Stewart Moss; Marianne McAndrew; Michael Pataki; Paul Carr; Arthur Space
- Cinematography: Matthew F. Leonetti
- Edited by: Tom Stevens
- Music by: Artie Kane
- Production company: American International Pictures
- Distributed by: American International Pictures
- Release date: January 30, 1974
- Running time: 93 minutes
- Country: United States
- Language: English

The Bat People is a 1974 American horror film directed by Jerry Jameson, produced by Lou Shaw, and distributed by American International Pictures. Starring Stewart Moss and Marianne McAndrew, the film tells the story of Dr. John Beck, who after being bitten by a bat in a cave, undergoes an accelerated transformation into a man-bat creature.

The Bat People is also known by two alternative titles: It Lives By Night and It's Alive. In 1999, the film was lampooned on the comedy series Mystery Science Theater 3000 in episode #1010. The film was widely panned by critics, who derided the screenplay, performances, and special effects.

== Plot ==
Dr. John Beck and his wife Cathy are newlyweds on an overdue honeymoon in southeastern California. While stopping to tour Mitchell Caverns, Dr. Beck begins to hear strange noises. Presently, they both notice a fruit bat has landed on their picnic blanket. Dr. Beck, who specializes in bats, manages to frighten the bat away as an uneasy Cathy looks on. Later, while on a guided tour inside the cave, he hears the same noises again and whispers, "The bats ... one of them is getting closer." He is then bitten on the forehead by the approaching bat.

Dr. Beck soon begins to experience mild seizures as Cathy becomes increasingly concerned. Later, while enjoying drinks with Cathy in a motel jacuzzi, Dr. Beck has a violent seizure, crushing the drinking glass in his hand and injuring it. A local physician, Dr. Kipling, notices the wound on his forehead while treating Dr. Beck's hand. Worried Dr. Beck may have contracted rabies from the bat, Dr. Kipling prescribes the Pasteur treatment. After Cathy admonishes her husband for initially dismissing the idea, Dr. Beck thinks better of it and agrees to begin treatment.

At the hospital, Dr. Kipling administers the first of 20 inoculations to Dr. Beck, who immediately has a violent seizure. After learning of the seizure from one of the attending nurses, Cathy pointedly remarks to Dr. Kipling that these strange seizures started before the treatment program began. Dr. Kipling assures her that the seizures are not connected to rabies since the incubation period is approximately one to five months. That night in his hospital bed, Dr. Beck fully transforms into a human-bat creature. The next morning, Cathy brings Dr. Beck flowers, but he appears deeply troubled, and suggests that a psychiatrist may be needed. After a heated argument, Dr. Beck withdraws the suggestion.

While shopping for a gift for Cathy, he has another seizure, but quickly covers his left hand to conceal any changes that might be visible. The local sheriff, Sgt. Ward, happens to witness the seizure while peering through the store window. The sheriff admits he's been following Dr. Beck, at which point the encounter becomes confrontational. Outside the store, Sgt. Ward says he is investigating an attack on a nurse known to be near his hospital room last night. The sheriff shows Dr. Beck his patient ID bracelet as evidence. That night, Dr. Beck gets out of his motel room bed, steals clothing from a store display mannequin, and kills a woman in a trailer park. Back at the motel, Cathy insists it was just a dream after Dr. Beck wakes up screaming next to her. Sgt. Ward soon appears at their motel room wanting to question Dr. Beck. Specifically, the sheriff asks him about a bandage found at the murder scene, which resembles one that used to cover Dr. Beck's hand.

The next day in his office, Dr. Kipling attempts to explain away the frequent nightmares Dr. Beck has been having. Later, in his hospital bed again, Dr. Beck has another seizure, but tries to convince himself that what he's experiencing is psychosomatic. He escapes out the window and steals an ambulance; Sgt. Ward pursues, but eventually crashes in a ditch. Dr. Beck also crashes his stolen ambulance and hides in a nearby barn, where he encounters a homeless man. After tending to the man's apparently broken hand and sampling his booze, Dr. Beck has another seizure and kills the homeless man. He then returns to Mitchell Caverns, where—fully transformed—he kills a tourist. Realizing he needs to consume blood, Dr. Beck retraces his steps to the hospital, where he forces a nurse to help him gain access to the facilities' refrigerated stock. Now satisfied, he manages to escape before Sgt. Ward arrives.

It is at this point that Dr. Beck decides to record a confession of his crimes, in addition to some details of his ongoing transformation, amongst other philosophical musings. Upon hearing a playback of the recording, Cathy refuses to believe a word of it, blaming the Pasteur treatment for his erratic behavior. Cathy later finds Dr. Beck back at the motel room, where she professes her love for him. In bed that night, she is bitten by Dr. Beck. The next day, Sgt. Ward tracks him to Mitchell Caverns. In the ensuing fight, the sheriff is disarmed, but manages to escape back to his department. While receiving medical attention, Sgt. Ward looks on in puzzlement as Cathy begins to hear the same noises Dr. Beck heard at the start of the film. While the two drive back to the motel, a horde of bats attacks the sheriff's car while Cathy observes from the passenger seat. The car ends up in a ditch; Cathy exits the vehicle and says blankly, "Goodbye, sergeant." The door now open, the mass of bats attacks Sgt. Ward, killing him. Cathy now accepts her fate as a human-bat creature, joining Dr. Beck in the cave.

== Cast ==
- Stewart Moss as Dr. John Beck
- Marianne McAndrew as Cathy Beck
- Michael Pataki as Sgt. Ward
- Paul Carr as Dr. Kipling
- Arthur Space as Tramp
- Robert Berk as Motel Owner
- Pat Delaney as Ms. Jax
- George Paulsin as Boy in Pickup
- Bonnie Van Dyke as Girl in Pickup
- Jeni Kulik as Nurse
- Laurie Brooks Jefferson as Nurse

== Release ==
=== Theatrical release ===
The film performed poorly at the box office.

=== Home media ===
The film was released on DVD by MGM as a double feature with The Beast Within on September 11, 2007. It was later released by Shout! Factory as a 4-film horror set on April 15, 2014. Shout! Factory released the film for the first time on Blu-ray on July 18, 2017.

== Reception ==
The Bat People was widely panned by critics.

Dave Sindelar, on his website Fantastic Movie Musings and Ramblings gave the film a negative review, calling it "forgettable". In his review of the film, Sindelar criticized the film's "leisurely pace", overuse of close-ups, and conclusion.

VideoHound's Golden Movie Retriever awarded the film one out of four bones, calling it "[a] less-than-gripping horror flick".

TV Guide awarded the film two out of five stars, commending the films special effects but criticizing the film's script and "mediocre" acting.

The Terror Trap gave the film 2/4 stars, writing, "this 1974 drive-in horror boasts some beautiful snowy vistas and picturesque desert landscapes. But that's not enough to save it from being overly sleepy, and poorly paced."

=== Mystery Science Theater 3000 ===
Under the name It Lives by Night, the film was featured in episode #1010 of Mystery Science Theater 3000. The episode debuted July 18, 1999, on the Sci-Fi Channel. Writer / performer Kevin Murphy wrote the movie was filmed in "unmistakably TV Movie Style," which he characterized as "irrepressibly bad acting, ... [with] up-to-the minute clothing and hair styles which date the film in an instant, ... squat title graphics, the giant cars, the Flockhartian thinness of the actresses, [and] the lack of anyone likable in the films." However, the style conjures memories of nights watching TV with his father, making the movie less painful than the usual dreadful offerings on the show.

Writer Jim Vorel placed the episode #134 (out of 197 total MST3K episodes) in his ranking of episodes from the series's first 12 seasons. Vorel called the movie "very dark and greasy" and mentions the protagonist's "bland, disinterested glumness." Still, he writes, "You can’t help but laugh at the costume that looks more like a werewolf or ape than a bat, or the strong supporting cast of derelict supporting actors." The episode did not make the Top 100 list of episodes as voted upon by MST3K Season 11 Kickstarter backers.

The MST3K version of It Lives by Night was included as part of the Mystery Science Theater 3000, Volume XXX DVD collection, released by Shout! Factory on July 29, 2014. The other episodes in the four-disc set include The Black Scorpion (episode #113), The Projected Man (episode #901), and Outlaw (episode #519).

== See also ==
- List of American films of 1974
