= Somebody Else Is Taking My Place =

1937 popular song

Song
- Written: 1937
- Published: December 13, 1941 by Shapiro, Bernstein & co., inc., New York.
- Genre: Traditional Pop
- Composer: Russ Morgan
- Lyricists: Dick Howard; Bob Ellsworth

"Somebody Else Is Taking My Place"
- A-side of the single

Single by Russ Morgan
- B-side: "'Neath A Tropical Moon"
- Released: December 1941
- Recorded: October 1941
- Studio: In New York City
- Genre: Swing; Instrumental
- Length: 3:14
- Label: Decca; 4098
- Songwriters: Dick Howard; Bob Ellsworth; Russ Morgan

Russ Morgan singles chronology
| "Ev'ry Time" (1941) | "Somebody Else Is Taking My Place" (1941) | "Sweet Eloise" (1942) |

"Somebody Else Is Taking My Place"
- A-side of the single

Single by Al Martino

from the album Somebody Else Is Taking My Place
- B-side: "With All My Heart"
- Released: February 1965
- Recorded: January 1965
- Genre: Pop; Vocal
- Length: 2:16
- Label: Capitol; 5384
- Songwriters: Dick Howard; Bob Ellsworth; Russ Morgan
- Producer: Voyle Gilmore

Al Martino singles chronology
| "My Heart Would Know" (1965) | "Somebody Else Is Taking My Place" (1965) | "My Cherie" (1965) |

"Somebody Else Is Taking My Place"
- A-side of the single

Single by Connie Francis

from the album Connie & Clyde – Hit Songs of the 30s
- B-side: "Brother, Can You Spare a Dime?"
- Released: June 1968
- Recorded: May 1968
- Genre: Jazz; Vocal
- Length: 2:31
- Label: MGM; K13948
- Songwriters: Dick Howard; Bob Ellsworth; Russ Morgan
- Producer: Don Costa

Connie Francis singles chronology
| "Why Say Goodbye" (1968) | "Somebody Else Is Taking My Place" (1968) | "I Don't Wanna Play House" (1968) |

"Somebody Else Is Taking My Place" is a song written by Dick Howard, Bob Ellsworth, and Russ Morgan, and recorded by numerous high-profile singers and band leaders, becoming a standard. It was first written in 1937, but was copyrighted in December 1941 and became popular from that point on. The song was first released as a single by Russ Morgan and his orchestra in late 1941.

That year Benny Goodman & his orchestra recorded the song with vocals by Peggy Lee as well, climbing to the top-10 in 1942. The song was revived in 1965 via an Al Martino single release, which did modestly both on the pop and adult-oriented charts. The final major version was done by Connie Francis for her 1968 concept album Connie & Clyde – Hit Songs of the 30s.

== Content ==
The song is a sentimental ballad, talking about how the singing person's crying and is heartbroken knowing that their former partner has found someone else, and that they go around "with a smile on [their] face."

== Russ Morgan and the Morganaires version ==
=== Release and reception ===
One of the original writers of the song, Russ Morgan and his orchestra released the single in October 1941, with vocals by the Morganaires. Billboard magazine would review the single and noted that Morgan "hasn't caused much excitement among piano fans," but saying "This song and its delivery should break the ice. It's a sentimental ballad, with the type of melody best suited waltzing and humming." Continuing, "Story is from the I Wonder What's Become of Sally school and harbors a real heart-throb. It’s sold like a million and will be effective for every type location."

=== Chart performance ===
The single would provide Russ Morgan his first 1940s hit; the song debuted on Billboard magazine's Music Popularity Chart in the issue dated March 27, 1942, peaking at No. 5 during an eleven-week run on the chart.

== Benny Goodman and Peggy Lee version ==
=== Release ===
Benny Goodman and his orchestra released the song as a single in December 1941 (catalogue number 6497), with vocals by Peggy Lee, it was backed by a Higginbotham and Meadows written jazz song, "That Did It Marie" and released by Okeh Records. The two songs were recorded on November 13, 1941. Billboard magazine gave "Somebody Else Is Taking My Place" a 71 out of 100 rating, commenting that a "fine band and a maturing Peggy Lee made a good record."

=== Chart performance ===
The single would provide Lee her first top 10 hit; the song debuted on Billboard magazine's Music Popularity Chart in the issue dated March 30, 1942, peaking at No. 5 during a nine-week run on the chart. "Somebody Else Is Takin' My Place" was reissued as a single in April 1948. The reissue charted again in 1948, reaching a different peak position (No. 30) than in its first release in 1941.

== Al Martino version ==
=== Release and reception ===
"Somebody Else Is Taking My Place" by Al Martino was released as a seven-inch single in February 1965 by Capitol Records. It was backed by "With All My Heart" on the B-side, a song that would chart alongside it. Both tracks were produced by Voyle Gilmore, with arrangements by Peter DeAngelis. The single was advertised as a "great standard" getting a "modern-big profit" treatment from Martino.

"Somebody Else Is Taking My Place" was given a positive critical response following its release. Billboard magazine stated that "The ever-green gets a pop treatment that should spiral it to No. 1 like Dean's 'Everybody Loves Somebody'" and called it a "First-rate Martino vocal." Cashbox magazine said that "One side, 'With All My Heart,' is a lyrical, full ork and chorus-backed shufflin’ pledge of romantic devotion sold feelingfully by the songster. The other lid, 'Somebody Else Is Taking My Place,' is an impressive heartfelt updating of the sentimental oldie delivered in a nostalgic heart-tugging style." Record World stated that the "reliable crooner comes through again with a warm reading of the oldie." The magazine noted that the chorus added a glow and that the single would be a hit.

=== Chart performance ===
In early 1965 during a six-week run the track peaked at No. 53 on the Billboard Hot 100, doing much better on the Billboard Easy Listening chart, where it peaked at No. 11. On another American music magazine the single was ranked lower, breaking into, but stalling at number 64 on the Cashbox Top 100 Singles "With All My Heart" charted alongside "Somebody Else Is Taking My Place" due to airplay, making the single a double sided hit. It bubbled under the Billboard Hot 100, reaching No. 22. But it broke into the Cashbox Top 100 Singles, reaching No. 99.

=== Track listing ===
7" vinyl single

- "Somebody Else Is Taking My Place" – 2:16
- "With All My Heart" – 2:59

== Connie Francis version ==
MGM advertisement for the single, the advert notes that the she sings the two oldie songs in a style that made her popular in the 1950s and 60s.

=== Release and reception ===
Connie Francis' version of "Somebody Else Is Taking My Place" was released as a seven-inch single by MGM Records in June 1968 in the United States, and in August 1968 in Canada. It was backed by a well known Great Depression song composed by Jay Gorney and written by Yip Harburg, "Brother, Can You Spare a Dime?" on the B-side. Both songs were originally recorded in an early May recording session. She would later recall that the song was one of her favorite ones to perform live. Both of the songs were produced, arranged, and conducted by American record producer Don Costa, and would appear in her 1968 Connie & Clyde – Hit Songs of the 30s concept album.

"Somebody Else Is Taking My Place" quickly started to catch on with local operators in Chicago and was also picked as one of the best jukebox bets for Peoria, Illinois and Toms River, New Jersey. But only with this minor locality, the single would be Francis' first 1960s US single to completely miss the charts, even with the MGM Records singles sales spike that happened in the summer, with the Singles Sale Manager for the company even listing the single as one of the better selling ones. In a review in October of that year, the Evening News and Star believed that the song is "sung well by Francis," but that the record "wouldn't sell" in England.

=== Track listing ===
7" vinyl single

- "Somebody Else Is Taking My Place" – 2:31
- "Brother, Can You Spare a Dime?" – 3:46

== Other versions ==
- Gene Autry and the Sons of the Pioneers sang "Somebody Else Is Taking My Place" in the 1942 film Call of the Canyon.
- Another charting version was released by Joni James in August 1961. The song reached No. 123 on the Cashbox Looking Ahead chart, which acted as a fifty-song extension of the main singles chart.
- Esther Phillips released the song as a single in October 1966, backed with "When Love Comes To The Human Race" on the B-side. Billboard predicted that it would reach the Hot 100 chart, but the single didn't appear on any chart.

== Charts ==
Chart performance for Russ' version
| Chart (1942) | Peak position |
|---|---|
| US Billboard Music Popularity Chart | 5 |

Chart performance for Goodman's version
| Chart (1942) | Peak position |
|---|---|
| US Billboard Music Popularity Chart | 5 |

Chart performance for Joni James' version
| Chart (1961) | Peak position |
|---|---|
| US Cashbox Looking Ahead | 123 |

Chart performance for Martino's version
| Chart (1965) | Peak position |
|---|---|
| US Billboard Hot 100 | 53 |
| US Billboard Easy Listening | 11 |
| US Cashbox Top 100 Singles | 64 |
