= Dana Suesse =

American musician, composer and lyricist

- Born: Nadine Dana Suesse; 1909
- Origin: Kansas City, Missouri, U.S.
- Died: October 16, 1987 (aged 77) New York, U.S.
- Occupations: Composer, musician, lyricist
- Instrument: Piano

Nadine Dana Suesse (/ˈswiːs/; December 3, 1909 – October 16, 1987) was an American musician, composer and lyricist.

== Biography ==
Dana Suesse was born in Kansas City, Missouri in 1909. When she grew too tall for ballet, she began piano lessons with Gertrude Concannon. While still a child, Suesse toured the Midwest vaudeville circuits in an act centered on dancing and piano playing. During the recital, she would ask the audience for a theme, and then weaving it into something of her own. In 1926, she and her mother moved to New York City.

Suesse began to create larger-scale pieces from which she would extrapolate a phrase and then set that tune to words, collaborating with a lyricist. "My Silent Love" (which came from a larger piece called "Jazz Nocturne"), and "You Oughta Be in Pictures" are among her most well-known and popular hits. She collaborated with lyricist Eddie Heyman on "You Ought to Be in Pictures" in addition to other hits, including "Ho-Hum." The 1930s press called Suesse "the girl Gershwin." Fortune, a magazine then devoted to male achievement, included her photo alongside eight other veterans of the music business, with the headline, "Nine Assets of a Prosperous Organization" (January 1933).

While in New York, Suesse studied piano under Alexander Siloti, a pupil of Franz Liszt. She studied composition under Rubin Goldmark, one of George Gershwin's teachers, and spent three years studying with Nadia Boulanger after World War II. In 1931, bandleader Paul Whiteman (following Gershwin's Rhapsody in Blue) commissioned her to write "Concerto in Three Rhythms."

In early 1932, she recorded a piano roll of the Sammy Fain and Irving Kahal popular tune "Was That The Human Thing To Do" for the Aeolian Company's Duo-Art reproducing piano system. Beginning in 1930, Suesse formed a songwriting partnership with impresario Billy Rose (usually in collaboration with other lyricists) that lasted into the 1940s.

In 1936 Suesse lived in Fort Worth, Texas for three months to compose the score for Rose's Casa Mañana, the spectacular outdoor dinner theatre of the Fort Worth (Texas) Frontier Centennial. With Rose and Irving Kahal she composed "The Night Is Young And You're So Beautiful," which won a fifth place on Your Hit Parade on the broadcast of February 6, 1937, and stayed on the program for six weeks. The Jan Garber, George Hall and Wayne King orchestras all recorded it in 1937, and in 1951 Ray Anthony's orchestra made it a hit again. On June 13, 1937 Amon G. Carter arranged for Billy Rose and Suesse to attend a dinner at the White House as guests of President and Mrs. Franklin D. Roosevelt. After dinner, music from Casa Mañana was performed by one of the show's stars, Everett Marshall.

Subsequently, she wrote many songs with Rose, including "Yours For A Song" (in collaboration with lyricist Ted Fetter), the theme of Billy Rose's Aquacade of the 1939 New York World's Fair. With lyricist E.Y. "Yip" Harburg Suesse wrote "Moon About Town" (for Jane Froman in the Ziegfeld Follies of 1934) and "Missouri Misery", both published in 1934. In the 1940s Suesse was Rose's staff composer for his legendary Diamond Horseshoe Revues.

After her success in writing popular songs (other lyricists included Harold Adamson, Sam Coslow) Suesse moved to Paris for three years to study composition with Nadia Boulanger. Boulanger accepted Suesse as a student on the recommendation of the great orchestrator Robert Russell Bennett, who was Suesse's tennis partner.

On December 11, 1974, Suesse and her husband produced a symphony concert at Carnegie Hall, devoted exclusively to her compositions. (In the 1990s, Robert Stern produced a CD of the concert using masters from Voice Of America.) On July 31, 1975, the Newport Music Festival (Rhode Island) presented four of her works in their concert series. A year after the Carnegie Hall concert, Suesse and her husband moved to the U.S. Virgin Islands.

After her husband's death in 1981, Suesse moved back to New York, the city where she had spent her most creative years. She took two apartments in the Gramercy Park Hotel and continued to write plays and songs for the theatre. Just before her death from a stroke on October 16, 1987, she was writing a new musical, putting the finishing touches on Mr. Sycamore, which had been optioned for off-Broadway, and was looking for a New York home for a straight play, Nemesis.

On September 24, 2003, John McGlinn conducted the BBC Concert Orchestra (UK) in a performance of American music that included three compositions by Suesse. Among the original productions for which Suesse composed are Sweet And Low (1930), You Never Know (1938), Crazy With the Heat (1941), and incidental music for both The Seven Year Itch (1952) and The Golden Fleecing (1959).

== Chronology ==
- 1909: Born Kansas City, Missouri, December 3
- 1919: First solo concert, Kansas City, Missouri
- 1926: Moves to New York City (December)
- 1927: First copyrighted song: "I Want the Whole World For You" (© 13 January 1927)
- 1928: Third copyrighted song: "Razor-Blade Blues" (© 9 October 1928; unpublished)
- 1928: "Syncopated Love Song" (copyrighted July 2) performed on station KWK by Merle Johnston’s Saxophone Quartet
- 1929: First publication: mood music for silent films; Nathaniel Shilkret records Syncopated Love Song (December 13)
- 1930: Rehearsal pianist, Billy Rose's first revue Sweet And Low. Syncopated Love Song published
- 1931: Staff composer at Famous Music; Jazz Nocturne becomes hit instrumental. Syncopated Love Song is made into song called "Have You Forgotten". Ho-Hum and Whistling In the Dark popularized internationally
- 1932: Jazz Nocturne is made into song called "My Silent Love", Paul Whiteman concert at Carnegie Hall (November 4) Concerto in Three Rhythms is introduced. In April, her piano roll recording of 'Was That The Human Thing To Do' is released as Duo-Art roll #0860
- 1933: Makes film appearance with Edward Heyman for Paramount, Astoria; Whiteman appearances: Madison Square Garden; Writes hit song for Ziegfeld Follies with Yip Harburg: Moon About Town
- 1934: Vera Brodsky and Harold Triggs (duo-pianists) perform Suesse’s ballet music for Tamara Geva at Radio City Music Hall; Town Hall concert conducted by Bernard Herrmann; Brooklyn Academy with Whiteman; Boston Symphony Hall Arthur Fiedler; writes songs for Broadway play The Red Cat; Appears on George Gershwin's radio broadcast (October 28); Whiteman records Blue Moonlight for Victor; You Oughta Be in Pictures is published
- 1935: Composes Sweet Surrender (Universal) film score; Performs with General Motors Symphony, Frank Black (né Frank Jeremiah Black; 1894–1968), conductor, in Studio 8H; Philadelphia Symphony Orchestra, conducted by Nathaniel Shilkret at Robin Hood Dell, Pennsylvania
- 1936: Billy Rose Casa Mañana, Fort Worth, Texas, Frontier Centennial, hit song "The Night Is Young and You're So Beautiful"
- 1937: More Casa Mañana; White House with President & Mrs. Roosevelt
- 1938: More radio appearances, writes song interpolated in Cole Porter show, You Never Know, Etc.; Robbins publishes instrumentals
- 1939: Composes suite for harpist Casper Reardon Young Man With a Harp; Philadelphia Orchestra performs harp suite with Reardon (July 19)
- 1940: Makes records for Schirmer Records; makes second visit to White House (March 4) with harpist Casper Reardon
- 1942: Composes and orchestrates 2-piano concerto; composes for Diamond Horseshoe Revue; Cocktail Suite; Meredith Willson recorded series includes American Nocturne
- 1943: Composes and orchestrates Three Cities suite; writes plays with Virginia Faulkner; Concerto in E Minor- Cincinnati Symphony Orchestra, duo-pianists Ethel Bartlett and Rae Robertson
- 1944: More Diamond Horseshoe scores
- 1946: Sells screenplay, It Takes Two, to RKO; Paul Whiteman introduces Night Sky (October 27) on broadcast
- 1947: It Takes Two (comedy written with Virginia Faulkner) opens (February 3); Departs for France (October) to study composition with Nadia Boulanger
- 1948: studies and composes concert music
- 1950: Sails back to New York (October); moves to 30 East 60th Street, Manhattan
- 1952: composes incidental music for the play The Seven Year Itch; The Girl Without a Name published
- 1953: Josephine (songs by Suesse) opens, Playhouse Theatre, Chicago
- 1955: Concerto Romantico performed at Cooper Union, broadcast on radio
- 1956: Concerto in Rhythm, premiered March 31, 1956, at Eastman Theatre; Dana Suesse, piano; Rochester Civic Orchestra, Frederick Fennell, conductor
- 1957: Buffalo Philharmonic Orchestra concert- conducted by Josef Krips
- 1959: Come Play With Me opens, York Playhouse, NY. with Tamara Geva, Liliane Montevecchi, Tom Poston (April 30); composes for play The Golden Fleecing
- 1970: Moves to New London, Connecticut
- 1974: Carnegie Hall Concert, The Music of Dana Suesse (December 11)
- 1975: Newport Music Festival concert; Sells Steinway to pianist Peter Mintun; Moves to Virgin Islands with husband
- 1979: Mintun honors Suesse at testimonial dinner, San Francisco. Reunited final time with Edward Heyman (September 10)
- 1981: Husband dies of cancer [July]; Moves to New York (October 9)
- 1982: This Time The Ladies (concert) Kool Jazz Festival, Carnegie Hall, produced by Sylvia Syms (July 3)
- 1982: October 1 is proclaimed Dana Suesse Day, Kansas City, Missouri; Suesse accepts honors from Mayor Richard L. Berkley in person. Last visit to Missouri; interview on WOR Radio Network(New York)
- 1986: Appears at Wall-To-Wall American Song tribute, Symphony Space, Manhattan
- 1987: Suesse dies from stroke (October 16)
- 1996: Two CDs are produced, devoted to the music of Suesse: Keyboard Wizards of the Gershwin Era (Pearl, UK) produced by Artis Wodehouse and The Night Is Young – The Concert Music of Dana Suesse (Premier) produced by Robert Stern
- 1998: Literary Executor Peter Mintun gives talk at Library of Congress for event "The Gershwins and Their World" (March)
- 2003: BBC Concert Orchestra conducted by John McGlinn, performs Afternoon of a Black Faun (arranged by Bernie Mayer), "Moon About Town" (arranged by Hans Spialek, sung by Kim Criswell) and "Serenade To A Skyscraper" (arranged by the composer) (September 24)
- 2005: Albany Symphony Orchestra Performs Concerto in Three Rhythms conducted by David Alan Miller, Kevin Cole, soloist (March 18)
- 2008: Jazz Nocturne: The Collected Piano Music Of Dana Suesse played by Sara Davis Buechner, E1 Distribution, KAS Music & Sound (USA)
- 2009: The Hot Springs Music Festival Symphony Orchestra performs Concerto in Three Rhythms (arranged in 1932 by Ferde Grofé for Paul Whiteman Orchestra, conducted by Richard Rosenberg; Michael Gurt, piano soloist (June 3). Festival Orchestra records Suesse's Jazz Nocturne (arranged by Carroll Huxley for Paul Whiteman Orchestra) and Concerto in Three Rhythms for Naxos Records (2010 release)
- 2011: On the Sono Luminus CD (DSL 92129), Suesse's Concerto in E Minor for Two Pianos & Orchestra (1943) is performed by Beatrice Long & Christina Long, duo-pianists, with the Eskişehir [Turkey] Greater Municipality Symphony Orchestra, conducted by Patrick Souillot. This concerto was introduced by pianists Ethel Bartlett and Rae Robertson with the Cincinnati Symphony Orchestra conducted by Eugene Aynsley Goossens
- 2013: Dana Suesse - The Girl Gershwin, concert by Tony Caramia, piano, Hatch Recital Hall, Eastman School of Music (March 26)

== Works ==
Dana Suesse's output includes many popular songs, short jazzy piano pieces, film scores and Broadway show tunes. Only her "serious" classical compositions are listed below.

- Syncopated Love Song for piano (1928); version for jazz orchestra with piano obbligato premiered on December 13, 1929, by Nathaniel Shilkret conducting the Victor Orchestra; in 1931 the main melody became a hit song under the title Have You Forgotten, with lyrics by Leo Robin
- Jazz Nocturne for piano (1931); also arranged for piano and orchestra by Carroll Huxley; the second theme became a popular hit as a song under the title "My Silent Love"
- Concerto in Three Rhythms for piano and orchestra (1932); commissioned by Paul Whiteman for his Fourth "Experiment in Modern Music" concert (Carnegie Hall, November 4, 1932) and orchestrated by Whiteman's chief arranger Ferde Grofé; later re-orchestrated by Dana Suesse herself without the constraints of the Paul Whiteman orchestra and premiered in 1974
- Symphonic Waltzes for piano and orchestra (1933); sometimes referred to as Jazz Waltzes or Eight Waltzes, although the eight sections are played without break and form a work in one continuous movement
- Danza a Media Noche for two pianos (1933)
- Blue Moonlight for orchestra with piano obbligato (1934); premiered during Paul Whiteman's Kraft Music Hall broadcast of October 11, 1934; also arranged for solo piano
- "Love Makes the World Go Round," song copyrighted in 1935, music by Dana Suesse, words by Edward Heyman from the 1935 film, Sweet Surrender
- Afternoon of a Black Faun for orchestra with piano obbligato (1936); originally entitled Evening in Harlem and retitled for publication in 1938; orchestration by Adolph Deutsch
- Young Man With a Harp, suite for harp and orchestra (1939); written for harpist Casper Reardon; also arranged by Dana Suesse for harp, piano and percussion and recorded in this form by Casper Reardon, Dana Suesse and Chauncey Morehouse (New York, April 12, 1940)
- Concerto for two pianos and orchestra in E minor (1934–1941)
- American Nocturne for orchestra with piano obbligato (1941); recorded by Meredith Willson And His Concert Orchestra as part of the 1941 LP "Modern American Music"; also arranged for solo piano
- Three Compositions for the Piano (At the Fountain; Midnight in Gramercy Square; Swamp-bird) (1941)
- 110th Street Rhumba for piano (1941); later orchestrated by Dana Suesse and premiered in this form during the Newport Music Festival, 1975
- Coronach for harp and orchestra (1941); dedicated to the memory of Casper Reardon, for whom she had composed her suite Young Man With a Harp two years before; broadcast on December 19, 1941
- Cocktail Suite for piano (1942); also orchestrated
- Three Cities Suite for symphony orchestra (1943)
- Concertino for piano and orchestra (published by E. H. Morris, 1945)
- Concerto Romantico for piano and orchestra in A major (1946)
- Night Sky for piano or for orchestra (1946); orchestral version premiered by Paul Whiteman and his Concert Orchestra on a Philco radio broadcast, 1946
- Jazz Concerto in D major for solo piano, combo and orchestra (1955); originally entitled Concerto in Rhythm but retitled in order to avoid confusion with her earlier 1932 Concerto in Three Rhythms; also arranged for two pianos and recorded in this form by Dana Suesse and Cy Coleman in 1956
- Scherzette/Whirligig for piano; later orchestrated by Dana Suesse (score published in 1956)

== Selected filmography and audio ==
- Edward Heyman & Dana Suesse, with Gertrude Niesen on YouTube (1933 film short), Paramount; OCLC 423282362
- Jazz Nocturne for piano on YouTube (1931), 1940 recording performed by Dana Suesse
- Symphonic Waltzes for piano and orchestra on YouTube (1933), 1935 recording by Dana Suesse with the General Motors Symphony Orchestra conducted by Frank Black in Studio 8H
- Blue Moonlight for orchestra with piano obbligato on YouTube (1934), recording by Paul Whiteman and his Concert Orchestra with Dana Suesse at the piano, recorded December 14, 1934, in New York
- Concerto for two pianos and orchestra in E minor on YouTube (1934–1941), Beatrice Long and Christina Long, pianos; Eskişehir Greater Municipality Symphony Orchestra conducted by Patrick Souillot
- Concerto in Three Rhythms for piano and orchestra on YouTube (1932), Michael Gurt, piano, Hot Springs Music Festival Symphony Orchestra conducted by Richard Rosenberg
- American Nocturne for orchestra with piano obbligato on YouTube (1941), recording performed by Dana Suesse
- Concerto Romantico for piano and orchestra in A major on YouTube (1946), recording of the world premiere (Cooper Union concert, Dana Suesse and the New York Symphony of The Air conducted by David Broekman (1899–1958) (fr), March 27, 1955
- Night Sky for piano or for orchestra on YouTube (1946), performance by Kayla Wong
- Jazz Concerto in D major for solo piano, combo and orchestra on YouTube (1955), Cy Coleman, piano, American Symphony Orchestra, Frederick Fennell, conductor, recorded live, Carnegie Hall, December 11, 1974
- Scherzette/Whirligig for piano on YouTube, Dana Suesse, piano

== Family ==
Dana Suesse, on July 26, 1940, in Fauquier County, Virginia, married 49-year-old Courtney Burr (né Howard Courtney Burr; 1891–1961), his second marriage. They divorced June 29, 1954. Suesse, on April 16, 1971, married businessman Charles Edwin Delinks (1912–1981), with whom she remained married until his death. Dana's father, Julius C. Suess (1877–1942) died January 16, 1942, in Chicago. Her mother, Nina (née Nina Louise Quarrier; 1886–1975) and father were divorced. Nina, around 1930, married Robert Chave Stevens (1896–1959). Nina died February 15, 1975, in Niantic, Connecticut.
