= You Oughta Be in Pictures =

Single by Rudy Vallée
- A-side: "Without That Certain Thing"
- Written: 1934
- Released: 1934
- Label: RCA
- Composer: Dana Suesse
- Lyricist: Edward Heyman

Rudy Vallée singles chronology
"Dancing in the Moonlight" (1934)	"You Oughta Be in Pictures" (1934)	"Oh, You Nasty Man" (1934)

"You Oughta Be in Pictures" is a 1934 song composed by the American songwriting team Dana Suesse and Edward Heyman. First recorded by Little Jack Little on February 8, 1934 for Columbia Records (catalog No. 2895D), it was recorded soon after by Rudy Vallée for RCA Records. Both versions were hits, and the song rapidly became the unofficial anthem of the American film industry. The song has been covered by numerous other singers, and is often used on the soundtrack of later productions set during the 1930s.

Original sheet music shows the title, "You Oughta Be in Pictures (My Star of Stars)" using the colloquial, "oughta" rather than the standard "ought to." The cover of the sheet music also notes, "Introduced in the William Rowland production "New York Town" released by Columbia Pictures, Inc."

The singer compliments the female object of the song in multiple ways, eventually making a comparison to movie stars who had been popular at the time, including "Crawford" (Joan Crawford), "Davies" (Marion Davies), "Gaynor" (Janet Gaynor), "West" (Mae West), "Garbo" (Greta Garbo), and "Tashman" (Lilyan Tashman).

The 1940 animated film You Ought to Be in Pictures opens with the song.

== Other versions ==
- Boswell Sisters - recorded March 23, 1934 for Brunswick Records (catalog 6798).
- Al Bowlly (1934) (Al Bowlly Discography)
- Connie Francis - for her album Connie & Clyde – Hit Songs of the 30s (1968). The song received updated references to the popular entertainers.
- Doris Day

== Uses in other media ==
"You Oughta Be in Pictures" was used in the film Inside Daisy Clover.

A cover version by The Boswell Sisters was featured in Halloween Horror Nights 13.

Little Edie sang the song in Grey Gardens.
