= Peter Mintun =

American pianist

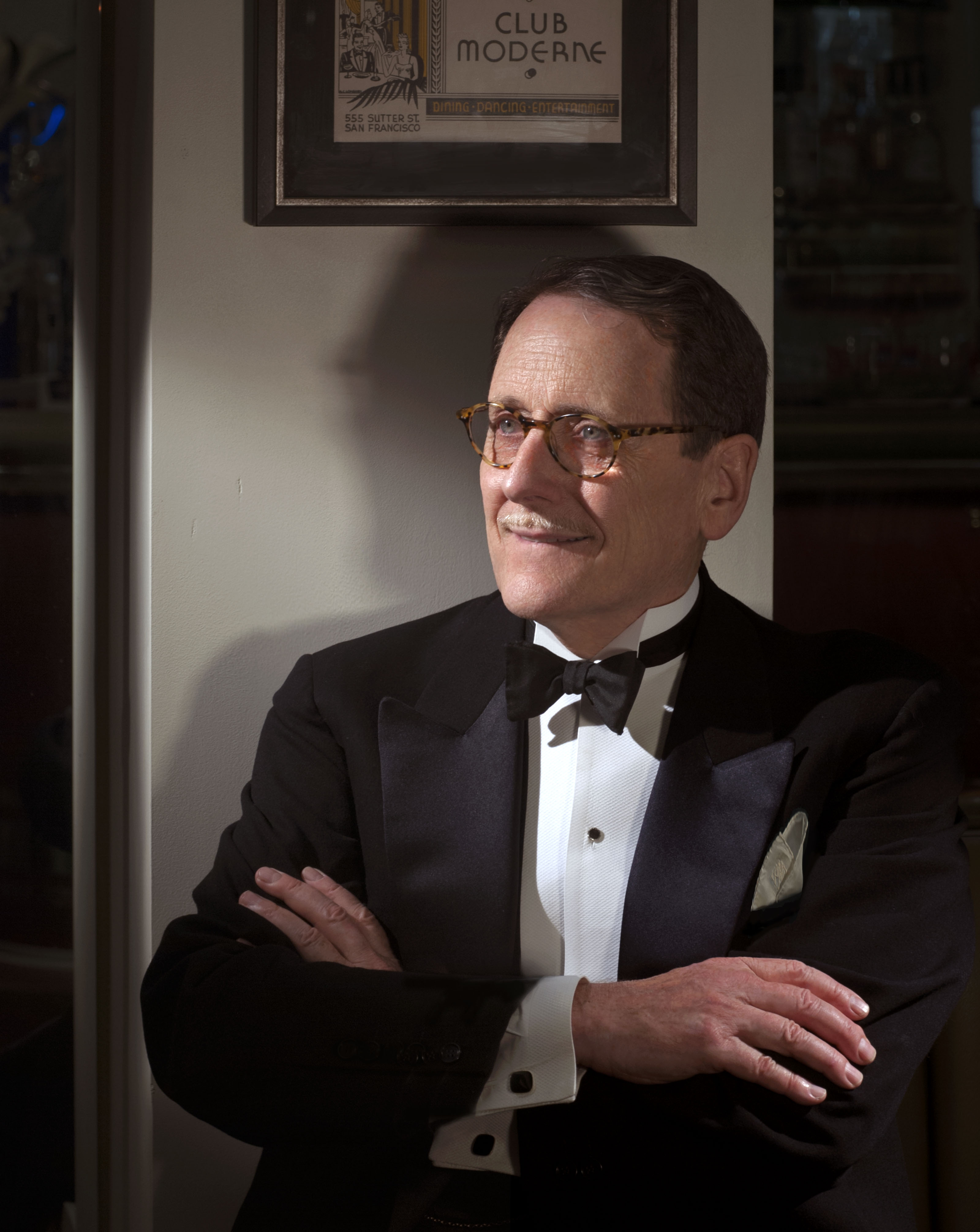
Mintun portrait by Mark Alan Vieira, Stooky's Club Moderne, San Francisco, 2016

Peter Mintun (born 1950), is an American pianist and historian of American music of the 1920s.

== Biography ==
He was born into a musical family in Berkeley, California. He grew up playing at parties and local events, and was drawn to American music of the 1920s, 1930s, and 1940s at an early age.

From 1973 to 1989, he played regularly at the San Francisco restaurant L’Etoile, then at the Fairmont San Francisco. He began playing in New York City, first at the New York Palace, and then spent seven years at Bemelmans Bar at the Carlyle Hotel. He moved to New York City in 2001.

Mintun has released three of his own recordings of songs of the 1920s and 1930s: “Deep Purple,” “Grand Piano,” and “Piano at the Paramount,” which were called "exemplars of re-creations of music of that era." He has also produced piano rolls, and has appeared in movies, on television, and in concert halls. Early in his career, he accompanied disco icon Sylvester on a series of recordings of vintage jazz tunes.

He is an authority on composer Dana Suesse, and has championed her music. He has been a consultant for numerous books on Jazz Age music. On buying an 1897 townhouse in Washington Heights, Manhattan, he became an informal neighborhood historian as well.
