= Goodnight, my Beautiful =

"Goodnight, My Beautiful"

Song by song in the musical "George White's Scandals of 1939"
- Released: 1939
- Genre: Big Band
- Songwriters: Sammy Fain; Jack Yellen

"Goodnight, my Beautiful" is a song written in 1939 by composer Sammy Fain and lyrics by Jack Yellen for the Broadway musical "George White's Scandals of 1939"

== History ==
"Goodnight, my Beautiful" was originally featured in George White's Scandals of 1939, Produced by George White. George White produced his musical venues from 1919 all the way to 1939. Production of the musical lasted from 28 August–November 1939 at the Alvin Theater and on 6 November-9 December 1939 at the Hollywood Theater. It would be George White last production due to financial difficulties. The song was featured on the first act as the third song and later on reused as the seventh song for the second act.

It received modest success and has covered by popular musicians Russ Morgan, Tommy Dorsey, Jimmy Dorsey, Shep Fields and Horace Heidt. Goodnight, my Beautiful was also popular for a brief period in Great Britain

== Legacy ==
Although the song was quickly forget by the public conscious as the song "Are You Havin' Any Fun?" also featured in the musical, gained more popularity, Goodnight, my Beautiful became the most popular song during the early 2020's due to ambient artist Leyland Kirby also known by his artistic name "The Caretaker" used the song's cover by Russ Morgan, several times through his two albums "An Empty Bliss Beyond This World" in the song ""Libets Delay" and again in his popular album Everywhere at the End of Time a six hour long album covering the most stages of Alzheimer's. The song is featured prominently in the third stage with the name "Back there Benjamin" and Libets Delay. The song also became popular through Analog horror videos on youtube.

== Notable recordings ==
- Shep Fields and His Rippling Rhythm-1 August 1939
- Tommy Dorsey and His Orchestra-3 August 1939
- Horace Heidt and His "Musical Knights"-9 August 1939
- Ben Bernie and His Orchestra-24 August 1939
- Donald Voorhees and His Orchestra-27 August 1939
- Victor Arden and His Orchestra-28 August 1939
- Johnny Messner and His Orchestra-5 September 1939
- Ella Logan-16 September 1939
- Andre Kostelanetz-18 September 1939
- Jack Benny and His Orchestra- 8 October 1939
- Al Pearce and His Gang-11 October 1939
- Jimmy Dorsey and His Orchestra-12 October 1939
- Paul Whiteman and His Orchestra-3 November 1939
- Billy Mills and His Orchestra-21 November 1939
- The Raymond Scott Quintette-3 December 1939
- Leslie Hutchinson at the Piano-29 December 1939
- Sydney Lipton and His Orchestra
- Russ Morgan and His Orchestra-Unknown 1939
- Jay Wilbur and His Orchestra 15 January 1940
- Beryl Davis-17 January 1940
- Arthur Young and His Orchestra, Vochals by Denny Dennis-19 January 1940
- Joe Loss and His band-19 January 1940
- Yorke De Souza-20 January 1940
- Ken "Snakehips" Johnson and His Orchestra-29 January 1940
- Rogelio Barba-1941
- Wayne King and His Orchestra-1946
