= Hello, Dolly! (film) =

1969 film by Gene Kelly

- Theatrical release poster by Richard Amsel
- Directed by: Gene Kelly
- Screenplay by: Ernest Lehman
- Based on: Hello, Dolly! by Michael Stewart The Matchmaker by Thornton Wilder
- Produced by: Ernest Lehman
- Starring: Barbra Streisand; Walter Matthau; Michael Crawford; Louis Armstrong
- Cinematography: Harry Stradling
- Edited by: William Reynolds
- Music by: Jerry Herman (music and lyrics); Score adaptation: Lennie Hayton; Lionel Newman
- Production company: Chenault Productions
- Distributed by: 20th Century-Fox
- Release date: December 16, 1969 (New York City)
- Running time: 148 minutes
- Country: United States
- Language: English
- Budget: $25 million
- Box office: $33.2 million (US and Canada rentals)

Hello, Dolly! is a 1969 American musical romantic comedy film based on the 1964 Broadway musical by Michael Stewart, which was based on Thornton Wilder's 1954 Broadway play The Matchmaker. Directed by Gene Kelly and written and produced by Ernest Lehman, the film stars Barbra Streisand, Walter Matthau, Michael Crawford, and Louis Armstrong (whose recording of the title tune had been a number-one hit in May 1964), with Marianne McAndrew, Danny Lockin, E. J. Peaker, Tommy Tune, and Fritz Feld.

The film follows the story of Dolly Levi, a strong-willed matchmaker who travels to Yonkers, New York, to find a match for the miserly "well-known unmarried half-a-millionaire" Horace Vandergelder. In doing so, she convinces his niece, his niece's intended, and Horace's two clerks to travel to New York City.

The film won three Academy Awards: for Best Art Direction, Best Score of a Musical Picture and Best Sound, and was nominated for four other Academy Awards, including Best Picture. Hello, Dolly! was one of the highest-grossing films of 1969 in the United States.

== Plot ==
In 1890, well-known widowed matchmaker Dolly Levi plans to travel to Yonkers, New York. She seeks a wife for Horace Vandergelder, an unmarried "half-a-millionaire". Meanwhile, young artist Ambrose Kemper wants to marry Horace's niece Ermengarde. Horace opposes this, feeling that Ambrose cannot provide financial security.

Horace, who owns Vandergelder's Hay and Feed, plans to travel to New York City to march in the 14th Street Parade and to propose to milliner Irene Molloy, whom he met through Dolly. After arriving in Yonkers, Dolly sends Horace ahead to New York. Before leaving, he tells his clerks, Cornelius Hackl and Barnaby Tucker, to mind the store.

Cornelius, however, decides that he and Barnaby need to venture out of Yonkers. Dolly overhears and sets them up with Irene and her shop assistant Minnie Fay. Dolly also helps Ambrose and Ermengarde, entering them in a dance contest at the upscale Harmonia Gardens restaurant, which she and her late husband Ephram frequented. The entire company takes the train to New York.

In New York, Irene and Minnie open their hat shop for the afternoon. Irene does not love Horace, but the marriage can provide her with financial security and an escape from her boring job.

Cornelius and Barnaby arrive at the shop, pretending to be rich. When Horace and Dolly arrive, Cornelius and Barnaby hide. Minnie screams when she finds Cornelius hiding in an armoire. Horace is about to open the armoire, but Dolly "searches" it and pronounces it empty. After hearing Cornelius sneeze, Horace storms out, realizing that there are men hiding in the shop but unaware that they are his clerks. Dolly arranges for Cornelius and Barnaby, who are still pretending to be rich, to take the women to dinner at Harmonia Gardens, to make up for their humiliation.

The clerks and the women attend the 14th Street Association Parade. In a moment alone, Dolly asks for her late husband Ephram's permission to marry Horace, requesting a sign. She resolves to go forward with life. After encountering old friend Gussie Granger on a parade float, Dolly catches up with the annoyed Horace, who is marching in the parade. She says that the heiress Ernestina Simple would be a good match for him and requests that he meet her that evening at Harmonia Gardens.

Because Cornelius and Barnaby have no money to hire a carriage, they tell Irene and Minnie that walking to the restaurant is more stylish. At the Harmonia Gardens restaurant, head waiter Rudolph prepares his crew for Dolly's return. Horace arrives to meet his date, who is really Gussie. She is neither rich nor elegant as Dolly implied, and leaves after being bored by Horace, as she and Dolly had planned.

Cornelius, Barnaby and their dates arrive, unaware that Horace is also there. Dolly shows up and is greeted by the staff. She sits in the now-empty seat at Horace's table, and says that no matter what he says, she will not marry him. Fearful of being caught, Cornelius confesses to the women that he and Barnaby are not wealthy.

Irene, who knew all along that they were pretending, offers to pay for the meal. However, Irene realizes that she left her handbag containing all her money at home. The four try to sneak out during the polka contest, but Horace recognizes them, then spots Ermengarde and Ambrose. In the ensuing confrontation, Horace fires the clerks, who are forced to flee as a riot breaks out. Cornelius professes his love for Irene. Horace declares that he has no intention of marrying Dolly.

The next morning, at the hay and feed store, Cornelius and Irene, Barnaby and Minnie, and Ambrose and Ermengarde all come to collect the money that Horace owes to them. Chastened, Horace admits that he needs Dolly, who is unsure about the marriage until Ephram sends her a sign. Cornelius becomes Horace's business partner at the store, and Barnaby fills Cornelius's old position. Horace says that life would be dull without Dolly, and she promises that she will "never go away again".

== Cast ==
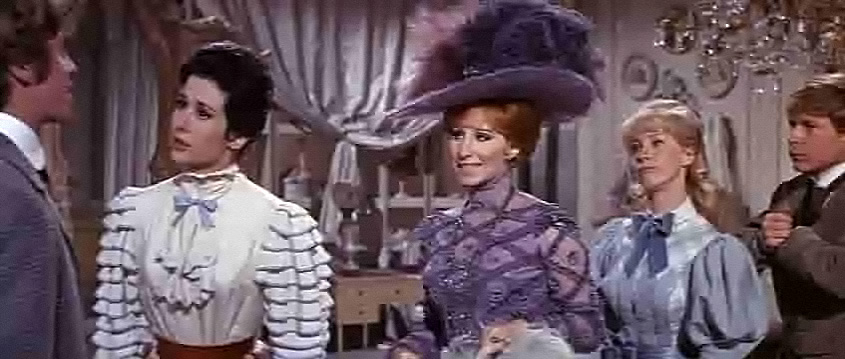
L-R: Michael Crawford, Marianne McAndrew, Barbra Streisand, E. J. Peaker and Danny Lockin

- Barbra Streisand as Dolly Levi
- Walter Matthau as Horace Vandergelder
- Michael Crawford as Cornelius Hackl
- Marianne McAndrew as Irene Molloy
  - Melissa Stafford as Irene's singing voice (solo numbers; uncredited)
- Danny Lockin as Barnaby Tucker
- E. J. Peaker as Minnie Fay
  - Gilda Maiken as Minnie's singing voice (group numbers; uncredited)
- Joyce Ames as Ermengarde Vandergelder
- Tommy Tune as Ambrose Kemper
- Judy Knaiz as Gussie Granger
- David Hurst as Rudolph Reisenweber
- Fritz Feld as Fritz, German waiter
- Richard Collier as Joe, Vandergelder's barber
- J. Pat O'Malley as policeman in park
- Louis Armstrong as orchestra leader
- Scatman Crothers as porter (uncredited)
- Tucker Smith as dancer (uncredited)
- Jennifer Gan as Miss Bolivia (uncredited)

== Musical numbers ==
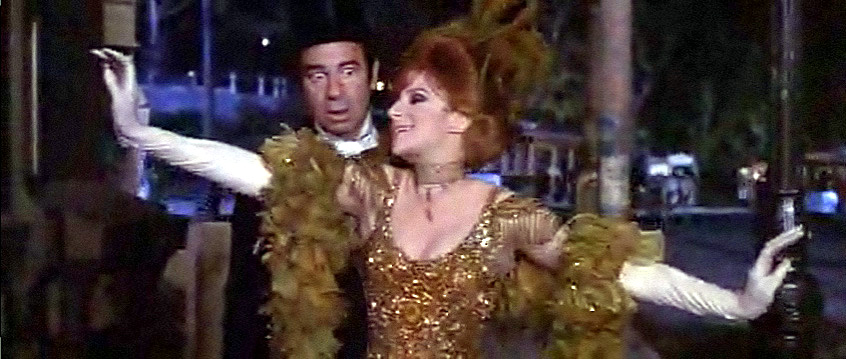
Walter Matthau and Barbra Streisand, "So Long, Dearie"

1. "Call On Dolly"
2. "Just Leave Everything To Me"
3. "Main Titles (Overture)"
4. "It Takes a Woman"
5. "It Takes a Woman (Reprise)"
6. "Put on Your Sunday Clothes"
7. "Ribbons Down My Back"
8. "Dancing"
9. "Before the Parade Passes By"
10. "Intermission"
11. "Elegance"
12. "Love is Only Love"
13. "Hello, Dolly!"
14. "It Only Takes a Moment"
15. "So Long, Dearie"
16. "Finale"
17. "End Credits"

The Hello, Dolly! soundtrack album was released on the LP and 8-track tape formats in December 1969. It was released on compact disc in November 1994. Both the LP and compact disc omit selections 1, 3, 10 and 17.

== Production ==
=== Filming ===
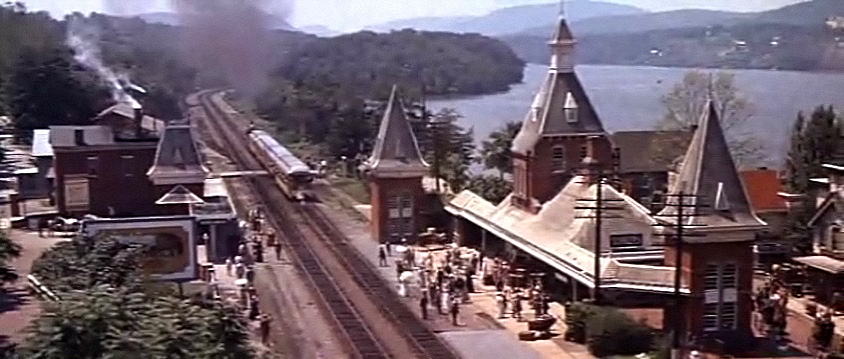
Location shot in Garrison, New York

The town of Garrison, New York, specifically the Garrison Landing Historic District around the train station, was the filming site for scenes in Yonkers. In the opening credits, the passenger train is traveling along the Hudson River on rails belonging to Penn Central. Provided by the Strasburg Rail Road, the train is pulled by Pennsylvania Railroad 1223 (now located in the Railroad Museum of Pennsylvania), retrofitted to resemble a New York Central & Hudson River locomotive. The locomotive, used in "Put on Your Sunday Clothes", was restored specifically for the film. The Poughkeepsie (Metro-North station) trackside platform was used at the beginning when Dolly is on her way to Yonkers.

The name of Judy Knaiz's character, Ernestina Semple, was changed from the stage version's Ernestina Money.

The church scene was filmed on the grounds of the United States Military Academy at West Point, New York, but the church's facade was constructed specifically for the film. The New York City scenes were filmed on the 20th Century Fox lot in California. Some of the exteriors still exist. The film was photographed in 65 mm Todd-AO by Harry Stradling.

The film was beset by tension on the set, with Streisand clashing with co-star Matthau and director Kelly. Choreographer Michael Kidd had conflicts with costume designer Irene Sharaff and Kelly, to the point at which he and Kelly were no longer on speaking terms. Tensions came to a head in a heated argument between Streisand and Matthau on June 6, 1968, on a hot day in Garrison on the day after the assassination of Robert F. Kennedy.

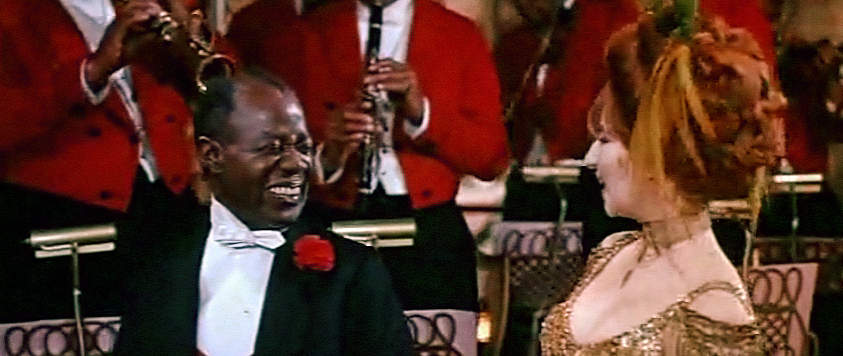
Louis Armstrong, who had a hit recording with the title song, as the orchestra leader.

=== Music ===
Most of the original Broadway production's score was preserved for the film. However, "Just Leave Everything to Me" and "Love Is Only Love" were not in the stage show. Jerry Herman wrote "Just Leave Everything to Me" especially for Streisand; it effectively replaced "I Put My Hand In" from the Broadway production. However, an instrumental version of parts of "I Put My Hand In" can be heard in the film during the dance competition at the Harmonia Gardens. Herman had written "Love is Only Love" for the stage version of Mame, but it was cut before its Broadway premiere. It occurs in the story as Mame tries to explain falling in love to her young nephew Patrick. A brief prologue of "Mrs. Horace Vandergelder" was added to the song to integrate it into this film.

Working under the musical direction of Lionel Newman and Lennie Hayton, the team of orchestrators included film stalwarts Herbert W. Spencer and Alexander Courage, the original Broadway production arranger Philip J. Lang, and established television and pop arrangers Joe Lipman, Don Costa and Frank Comstock. All of the actors did their own singing, except for Marianne McAndrew, whose singing was dubbed by Melissa Stafford for Irene's vocal solos, and Gilda Maiken, when Irene sings with other characters.

== Release ==
=== U.S. premieres ===
The film premiered in New York City at the Rivoli Theatre on December 16, 1969. Production had wrapped more than a year prior, but release was significantly delayed for contractual reasons. A clause in the 1965 film-sale contract specified that the film could not be released until June 20, 1971, or when the show closed on Broadway, whichever came first.

In 1969, the show was still running. Eager to release the film to recoup its cost, Fox negotiated and paid an "early release" escape payment to release the film, which cost Fox an estimated $1–2 million. The following day, the film started 45 roadshow engagements around the United States and Canada, before opening worldwide on December 18, starting in Belgium, the Netherlands, New Zealand and South Africa.

=== Home media ===
Hello, Dolly! was one of the first theatrical films to be released on the new VHS and Betamax home-video formats in fall 1978. It was released on DVD in 2003 and Blu-ray in 2013. It began streaming on Disney+ on May 22, 2020.

== Reception ==
=== Box office ===
The film opened strongly, finishing in third place at the US box office, behind On Her Majesty's Secret Service and Easy Rider in its opening week, and initially grossed more than The Sound of Music, but lost momentum and became a disappointment at the box office. It grossed $33.2 million at the box office in the United States, earning a theatrical rental (the distributor's share of the box office after deducting the exhibitor's cut) of $15.2 million, ranking it in the top five highest-grossing films of the 1969–1970 season.

In total, it earned $33.2 million in theatrical rentals for Fox, against its $25.335 million production budget. Despite performing decently at the box office, the losses worsened. Over the last few decades, however, it has gone substantially into profit due to successful home-video sales, beginning in 1978, when it went "gold" for VHS and Betamax sales at a then-suggested retail price of US$69.95.

The soundtrack album's sales also did not live up to expectations, peaking at number 49 on the Billboard chart.

=== Critical response ===
The film received favorable reviews on release, but some critics felt that it was not a success as a musical, with Kelly and Kidd making little use of the widescreen format of the film. Critic Tom Santopietro described their approach as "shoveling more and more bodies on-screen with no apparent purpose".

Vincent Canby, in his review for The New York Times, said that the producer and director "merely inflated the faults to elephantine proportions".

Eric Henderson of Slant Magazine said, "More infamous for bringing Fox financially to its knees than for being the last major musical directed by Gene Kelly, Hello, Dolly! is one big-assed bull in a china shop. The film cost nearly as much to produce as Cleopatra and made far less at the box office, thus earning the film its reputation as one of Hollywood's foremost turkeys."

On the review aggregator website Rotten Tomatoes, the film holds an approval rating of 43% based on 30 reviews, with an average rating of 5.9/10. The website's critics consensus reads, "Though Streisand charms, she's miscast as the titular middle-aged widow in Gene Kelly's sluggish and over-produced final directorial effort."

=== Accolades ===
Award	Category	Recipient(s)	Result	Ref.
Academy Awards	Best Picture	Ernest Lehman	Nominated	
Academy Awards	Best Art Direction	John DeCuir, Jack Martin Smith, Herman A. Blumenthal, Walter M. Scott, George James Hopkins, and Raphaël Bretton	Won	
Academy Awards	Best Cinematography	Harry Stradling (Note: Posthumous nomination)	Nominated	
Academy Awards	Best Costume Design	Irene Sharaff	Nominated	
Academy Awards	Best Film Editing	William H. Reynolds	Nominated	
Academy Awards	Best Score of a Musical Picture – Original or Adaptation	Lennie Hayton and Lionel Newman	Won	
Academy Awards	Best Sound	Jack Solomon and Murray Spivack	Won	
American Cinema Editors Awards	Best Edited Feature Film	William H. Reynolds	Won (Note: Tied with Warren Low for True Grit)	
British Academy Film Awards	Best Actor in a Leading Role	Walter Matthau (Note: Also for The Secret Life of an American Wife)	Nominated	
British Academy Film Awards	Best Actress in a Leading Role	Barbra Streisand (Note: Also for Funny Girl)	Nominated	
British Academy Film Awards	Best Art Direction	John DeCuir	Nominated	
British Academy Film Awards	Best Cinematography	Harry Stradling	Nominated	
Directors Guild of America Awards	Outstanding Directorial Achievement in Motion Pictures	Gene Kelly	Nominated	
Golden Globe Awards	Best Motion Picture – Musical or Comedy		Nominated	
Golden Globe Awards	Best Actress in a Motion Picture – Musical or Comedy	Barbra Streisand	Nominated	
Golden Globe Awards	Best Supporting Actress – Motion Picture	Marianne McAndrew	Nominated	
Golden Globe Awards	Best Director – Motion Picture	Gene Kelly	Nominated	
Golden Globe Awards	Most Promising Newcomer – Female	Marianne McAndrew	Nominated	

== In other media ==
- Upon the film's release, Dolly's Restaurant opened in Garrison, NY, directly across from the train station where the Yonkers scenes were filmed. The restaurant closed in 2008 and reopened in 2018 under new ownership.
- Songs and footage from the scenes "Put on Your Sunday Clothes" and "It Only Takes a Moment", as well as still images from the film in general, were prominently featured in the 2008 Disney-Pixar film WALL-E. In the film, WALL-E watches the footage from an old Betamax tape and learns about the concept of love from the film.
- The songs "Elegance" and "Put on Your Sunday Clothes" are heard through any day at the Main Street section of the Magic Kingdom in Walt Disney World, with the addition of "Before the Parade Passes By" at Disneyland in Anaheim.
- The song "Just Leave Everything to Me" is heard in the Season-2 opening of The Marvelous Mrs. Maisel.
- The title song was parodied in the Freakazoid! episode "Dexter's Date" as "Bonjour Lobey", with Freakazoid's glitching powers turning him into a blue Louis Armstrong to sing with The Lobe.
- The SpongeBob SquarePants episode "Something Smells" from season 2 features the title after SpongeBob says "hello" to all the random parade members.

== See also ==
- Hello, Dolly! – 1964 Broadway musical
- List of American films of 1969
- The Matchmaker – 1958 film by Joseph Anthony
