= The Skylarks (vocal group) =

American singing group of the 1940s–1970s

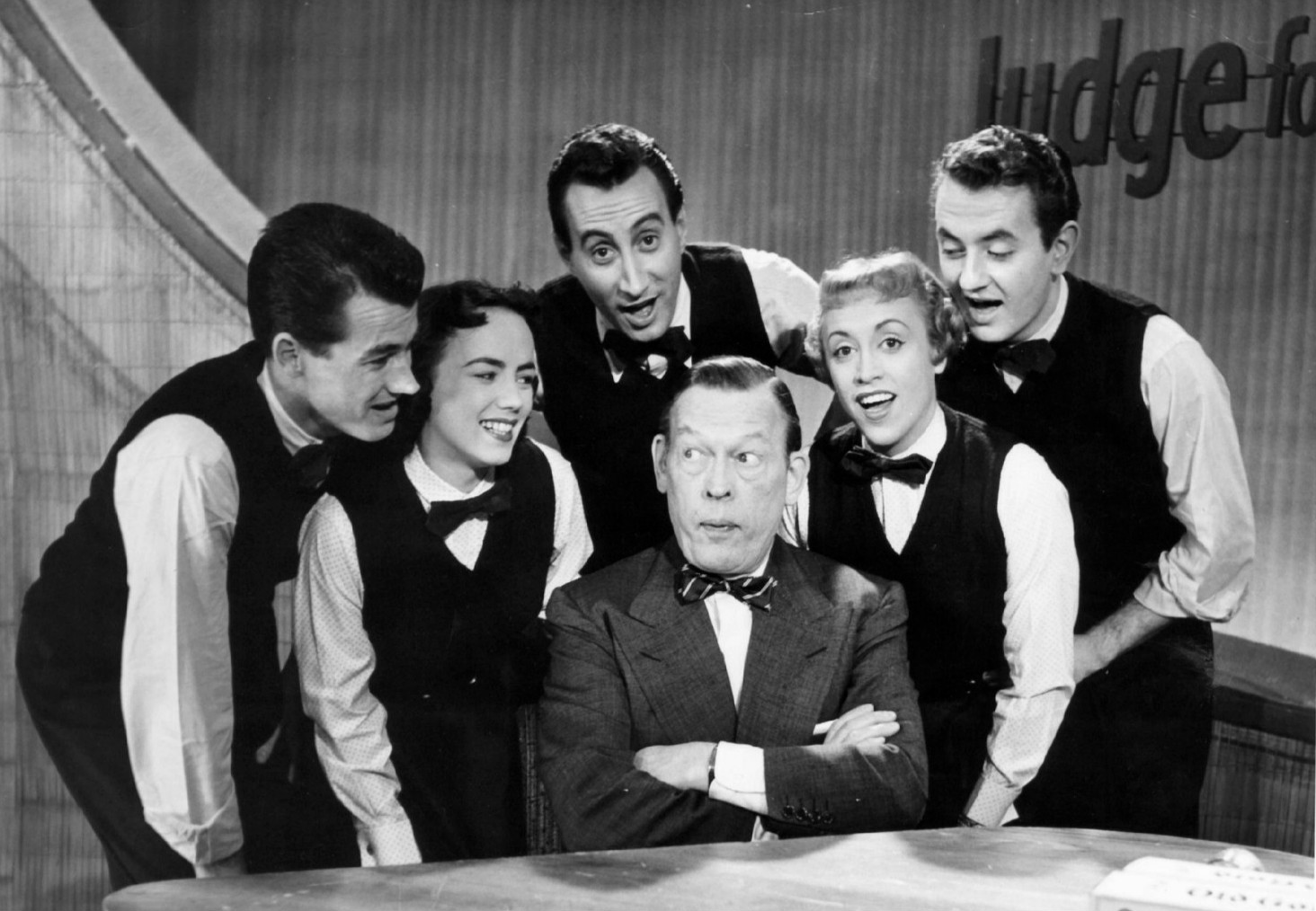
The Skylarks on the TV show Judge for Yourself (1954). Standing (L-R) Joe Hamilton, Jackie Gershwin, George Becker, Gilda Maikin, and Earl Brown. Center: Fred Allen

The Skylarks were an American jazz and pop music vocal group of the 20th century.

The group was formed during World War II, in 1942, by four servicemen serving in the American Panama Canal Zone – Bob Sprague (first tenor), Harry Gedicke (second tenor), Harry Shuman (baritone), and arranger and lead singer George Becker. Under the name The Velvetones they toured bases in Panama and appeared in a weekly program on Armed Forces Radio Network.

After the end of the war and their discharge, the group relocated to Detroit and added a female lead singer, the lively and charismatic Gilda Maiken. The group appeared on national radio, and Woody Herman engaged them to appear with his band. Upon joining Herman they changed their name to the Blue Moods. They recorded "Stars Fell on Alabama" and toured with Herman, but Herman's band broke up in 1947, after which they recorded two songs with Bing Crosby, who changed their name to The Skylarks. In 1948 they joined and recorded with Jimmy Dorsey's orchestra, but Dorsey's band soon broke up, after which Harry James hired them. In 1949 The Skylarks recorded with Russ Morgan and had number one hits with "Cruising Down the River" and "Forever and Ever".

By this time The Skylarks had added a second female singer and consisted of original member George Becker, early member Gilda Maiken, and Chick Gale, Joe Pryor, and Gladys Vesely. By the 1950s lineup was Becker, Maiken, Joe Hamilton, Earl Brown, and female singer, Jackie Gershwin (later replaced by Carol Lombard; Donna Manners and Peggy Clark also later spent some time in the group). They sang backup for artists including Dinah Shore, Eddie Fisher, Danny Kaye, Jerry Lewis, Betty Hutton, Dean Martin, and Frank Sinatra. On their own they had a number 28 hit in 1953 with "I Had the Craziest Dream" from the film Springtime in the Rockies (1942) starring Betty Grable. The Skylarks also appear on the soundtrack of White Christmas, accompanying Danny Kaye on “Choreography” and “The Best Things Happen While You’re Dancing.” They also reprise the latter on their own during the cast party scene.

The Skylarks toured with Dinah Shore and Martin and Lewis and appeared on TV variety shows in the 1950s, 1960s, and 1970s (The Danny Kaye Show, The Dinah Shore Show (where they were regular performers, 1956–1957), The George Burns and Gracie Allen Show, The Carol Burnett Show, The Sonny & Cher Comedy Hour). Their 1957 album Ridin' On The Moon was described by musicologist Todd Decker as "a forgotten masterpiece of jazz arranging and singing"; Decker described "Ol' Man River", released from the album as a single, as "a kind of cubist assemblage of familiar elements made delightfully strange... Kern's angular bridge gets some spectacular chromatic remaking".

The Skylarks farewell concert was in 1979, at the Hollywood Palladium.

== Discography ==
Album

- Ridin' On The Moon (1957, Verve MG V 2077)
