= Marianne McAndrew =

American actress

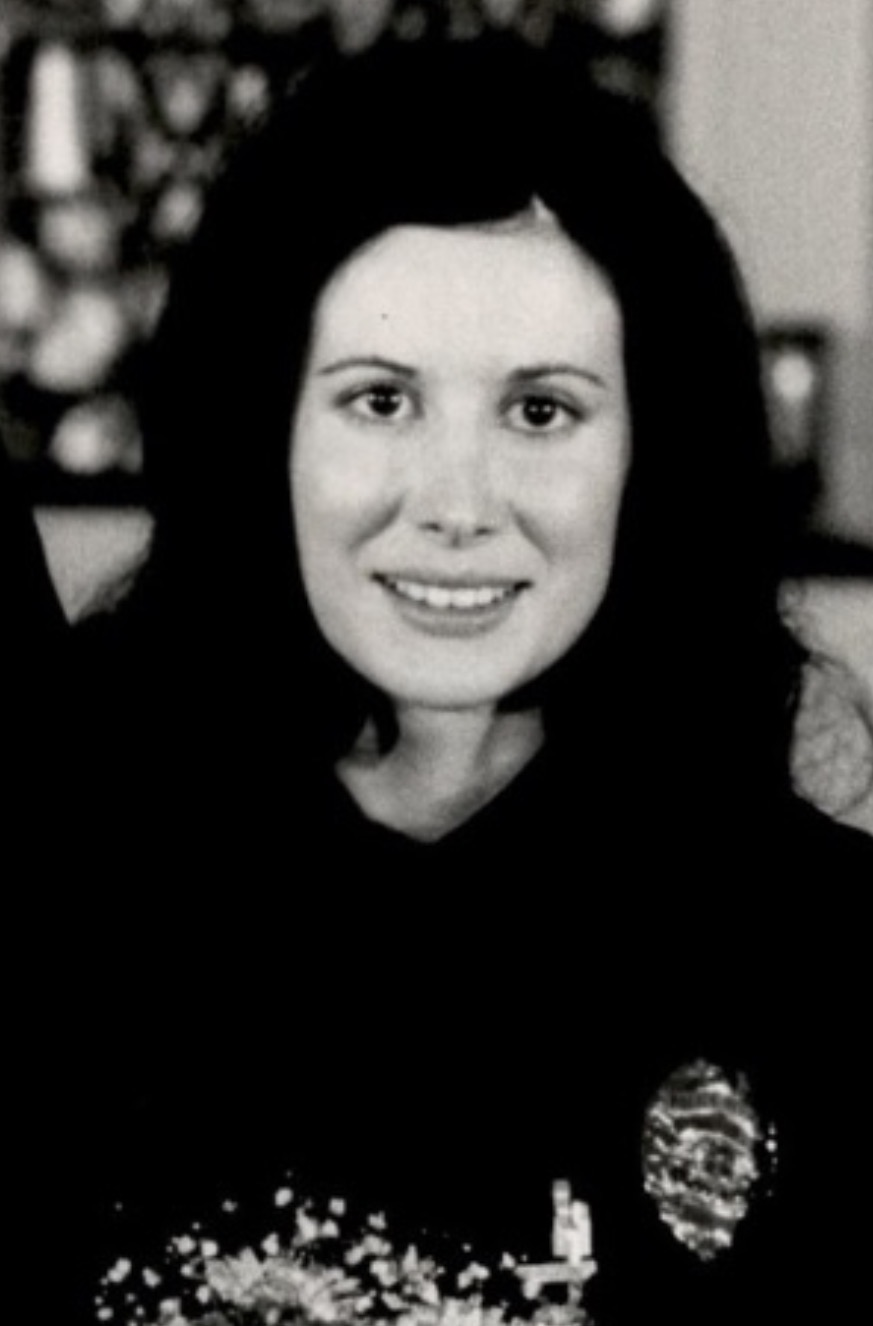
- McAndrew in 1975
- Occupation: Actress
- Years active: 1967–2000
- Spouse: Stewart Moss (m. 1968; died 2017)

Marianne McAndrew is a retired American actress known for her role as Irene Molloy in the film Hello, Dolly!

== Career ==
Hello, Dolly! was McAndrew's first credited film role. The role of Irene Molloy was given considerably more attention in the film than in earlier Broadway productions. Hello, Dolly! earned McAndrew two Golden Globe nominations in 1969; Golden Globe Award for Best Supporting Actress – Motion Picture and the since discontinued Golden Globe Award for New Star of the Year – Actress, as well as generally good reviews. She landed a starring (second billed) role in her next film (The Seven Minutes). By 1971, she had made appearances in popular TV shows including The F.B.I., Hawaii Five-0, Mannix, Cannon and Love, American Style also appearing in Highway To Heaven in 1985 in the 2nd season episode 6 "Birds of a Feather"

One notable later film role was her co-starring role in The Bat People, with her husband Stewart Moss. The film was widely panned, and is still somewhat known today as a "bad film". The Bat People was also her last film released in theaters; she has only worked in television since its release. Her only other later role of particular note is her role of Doris Williams in Growing Up Brady, a TV film about the popular show. McAndrew, along with everything else related to the film Hello, Dolly! experienced something of a resurgence in popularity with the release of WALL-E, which featured clips from the film, including a duet with McAndrew's character (but McAndrew did not do her own singing in the film, which some news outlets claimed in articles about WALL-E).

== Personal life ==
McAndrew married actor Stewart Moss in 1968, remaining married until his death in 2017. They starred together in The Bat People. McAndrew has two brothers.

== Awards and honors ==
Hello, Dolly! earned McAndrew two Golden Globe nominations in 1969; Golden Globe Award for Best Supporting Actress – Motion Picture and the since discontinued Golden Globe Award for New Star of the Year – Actress.

== Filmography ==
Film	Year	Role	Notes
Hello, Dolly!	1969	Irene Molloy	
The Seven Minutes	1971	Maggie Russell	
Chandler	1971	Angel Carter	
The Bat People	1974	Cathy Beck	
Growing Up Brady	2000	Doris Williams	
WALL-E	2008	Irene Molloy	footage from Hello, Dolly!
