= Casper Reardon =

American classical and jazz harpist

- Born: April 15, 1907; Little Falls, New York, U.S.
- Died: March 9, 1941 (aged 33) New York City, U.S.
- Genres: Classical music, jazz
- Occupation: Musician
- Instrument: Harp

Casper Reardon (April 15, 1907 – March 9, 1941) was an American classical and jazz harpist. He studied classical harp at the Curtis Institute of Music and went on to play for the Philadelphia Orchestra and the Cincinnati Symphony Orchestra. Later on, he played jazz.

The harp had been used in dance music for occasional flourishes before Reardon, but he is considered a first for using harp as a jazz instrument for solos and performances. By 1936, he was described as the "World's Hottest Harpist". During the following year he played "Cousin Caspar" in the film, You're a Sweetheart. In 1938, he played harp for the Broadway musical, I Married an Angel.

As a jazz musician he can be heard on albums by Jack Teagarden and Paul Whiteman. He recorded a handful of records for Liberty Music Shop Records and Schirmer Records.

He died in March 1941, in New York, at the age of 33 from kidney failure.
