= Forever and Ever (Franz Winkler and Malia Rosa song) =

Popular song from a German song written by Franz Winkler

"Forever and Ever" is a popular song, from a German song, "Fliege mit mir in die Heimat" written by the Austrian songwriter Franz Winkler. It was adopted by the German Luftwaffe as their song during World War II. The English lyrics were written by Malia Rosa in 1948. It was originally recorded by Gracie Fields with Robert Farnon's Orchestra on 23 October 1948 and released on Decca F9031. Her version was subsequently released in the USA on London 362 and it charted briefly in 1949.

== 1949 recordings ==
There were a number of popular recordings in 1949:

- The song was also recorded by Russ Morgan with vocals by The Skylarks on January 20, 1949, for Decca Records and the song reached the top of the Billboard charts.
- It was recorded by Perry Como on January 13, 1949, and released as a single that year by RCA Victor Records. The 78 rpm version was released with catalog number 20-3347-A, the 45 rpm version was released with catalog number 47-2892-A. The flip side was "I Don't See Me in Your Eyes Anymore." The record first hit the Billboard chart on March 19, 1949, and it reached position #2, staying there for 4 weeks. In the United Kingdom, it was released by His Master's Voice as a 78 rpm version with catalog number BD-1250 in June 1949. The flip side was "A - You're Adorable."
- Other charted versions in 1949 were by Margaret Whiting (recorded on January 27, 1949, Capitol 15386), and by Dinah Shore with Harry Zimmerman's Orchestra (Columbia 38410) on January 13, 1949.
- Bob and Alf Pearson recorded it in 1949.

== Simon et les Modanais version ==
"Ėtoile des neiges"

Single by Simon et les Modanais

from the album Il était une fois en Savoie...
- B-side: "Au bar de l'edelweiss"
- Released: 1988
- Recorded: 1987
- Genre: Rock, musette
- Length: 3:50
- Label: BMG-Ariola
- Songwriters: Jacques Plante, Franz Winkler
- Producer: Jean Soullier

Simon et les Modanais singles chronology
| "Ėtoile des neiges" (1988) | "Il pleut sur la route" (1988) |

In 1987, "Forever and Ever" was covered in French-language by Simon et les Modanais, under the title "Ėtoile des neiges". It was released in January 1988 as the first single from their debut album Il était une fois en Savoie. It achieved a great success in Belgium (Wallonia) and France where it was respectively a top one and two hit.

=== Background and release ===
Bernard Simon, railway worker in Modane and amateur singer in a small group covering Johnny Hallyday's songs and rehearsing in a disused chapel, performed one evening in a ball a cover of "Étoile des neiges" in a rock-musette style, which quickly became popular. Friend Jacques Vise went to Paris to propose the song and, in six months, they managed to get an old studio to record a model; presented to the BMG label, the song was accepted by the producers, but they asked the band to convey an image of a "terroir" group, with Louis Testardi as drummer, Jacques Vise as keyboards player and Véronique Vise as bassist. The often deemed kitsch music video, which begins with bells sounds, displays Simon dressed with a perfecto and a bow tie trying to seduce shepherdess Véronique. As the song was successful, the Modane town hall elected the members of the group honorary citizens of the town.

=== Chart performance ===
In France, "Étoile des neiges" debuted at number 46 on the chart edition of 30 January 1988, entered the top ten four weeks later where it stayed for 12 weeks, peaked at number two for a sole week in its eighth week, being blocked from the number one slot by Glenn Medeiros' hit "Nothing's Gonna Change My Love for You", and fell off the top 50 after 22 weeks of presence. It earned a gold disc awarded by the Syndicat National de l'Édition Phonographique. In the Walloon region of Belgium, it was a number one hit for consecutive three weeks from 9 to 23 April 1988, and cumulated six weeks in the top three. On the Music & Media's European Hot 100 Singles chart, it debuted at number 78 on 27 February 1988 and reached a peak of number 6 for six weeks, and left the chart after 19 weeks.

=== Track listings ===
- 7" single
1. "Étoile des neiges" – 3:50
2. "Au bar de l'edelweiss" – 3:00
- 12" maxi
1. "Étoile des neiges" (Modane mix) – 5:11
2. "Au bar de l'edelweiss" – 3:00
3. "Étoile des neiges" (instrumental) – 3:50

=== Charts and certifications ===
==== Weekly charts ====
| Chart (1988) | Peak position |
|---|---|
| Belgium (Ultratop 50 Wallonia) | 1 |
| Europe (European Hot 100) | 6 |
| France (SNEP) | 2 |

==== Year-end charts ====
| Chart (1988) | Position |
|---|---|
| Europe (European Hot 100) | 42 |

==== Certifications ====
Certifications for "Étoile des neiges"
| Region | Certification | Certified units/sales |
|---|---|---|
| France (SNEP) | Gold | 500,000^{*} |
^{*} Sales figures based on certification alone.

== Other recordings ==
- Bing Crosby recorded the song in 1962 for his album On the Happy Side.
