= Russ Morgan =

American bandleader and composer (1904–1969)

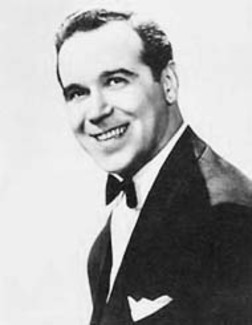
- Russ Morgan, American big band leader and arranger.

Background information
- Born: Russell Morgan; April 29, 1904; Scranton, Pennsylvania, U.S.
- Died: August 7, 1969 (aged 65) Las Vegas, Nevada, U.S.
- Genres: Jazz, swing
- Occupations: Bandleader; arranger; conductor; composer
- Years active: 1920s–1960s

Russell Morgan (April 29, 1904 – August 7, 1969) was an American big band leader and arranger during the 1930s and 1940s. He was best known for being one of the composers of the song "You're Nobody till Somebody Loves You", with Larry Stock and James Cavanaugh, and was the first to record it in 1944.

In the early 2020s, he regained popularity due to some of his music being sampled by the Caretaker on his albums An Empty Bliss Beyond This World and Everywhere at the End of Time, the latter of which plays loops of progressively degraded big band music to portray Alzheimer's disease. Some of Morgan's songs sampled by the Caretaker include “Goodnight my Beautiful” (sampled in "Libet's Delay", "Back There Benjamin", "Libet's All Joyful Camaraderie", and "Libet Delay"), "Moonlight and Shadows" (sampled in "Childishly Fresh Eyes"), and "Room with a View" (sampled in "My Heart Will Stop in Joy").

== Biography ==
=== Early life ===
Born into a Welsh family in Scranton, Pennsylvania, United States, Morgan was encouraged to express himself musically from the age of seven. His father, a coal mine foreman, was a former musician who played drums in a local band in his spare time. Morgan's mother had been a pianist in a vaudeville act. Morgan began to study piano and worked in the mines to earn money to help support his family and pay for his lessons.

At the age of 14, Morgan earned money as a pianist in a theater in Scranton. He purchased a trombone and learned to play it. In 1921, he played trombone with the Scranton Sirens, which became popular in Pennsylvania during the 1920s. Besides Morgan, several of its members became famous, including Jimmy Dorsey on saxophone and clarinet, Billy Lustig on violin, and Tommy Dorsey on trombone, taking Morgan's place when Morgan left the band.

=== Early career ===
In 1922, Morgan moved to New York. Three years later, at the age of twenty-one, he wrote arrangements for John Philip Sousa and Victor Herbert. He then joined Paul Specht's orchestra and toured throughout Europe with the orchestra. Colleagues of Morgan in Specht's orchestra included Arthur Schutt, Don Lindley, Chauncey Morehouse, Orville Knapp, Paul Whiteman, Charlie Spivak, and Artie Shaw.

After returning from Europe, Jean Goldkette invited Morgan to Detroit to lead his band. Some members of the Goldkette Orchestra were former associates. The band included Tommy and Jimmy Dorsey, Chauncey Morehouse, Joe Venuti, Eddie Lang, Bix Beiderbecke, and Fuzzy Farrar.

Morgan's first records were made for OKeh in mid 1930 for Parlophone and Odeon, usually under the name "Russell Brown and his Orchestra". During the early 1930s, Morgan joined the group of anonymous studio groups recording pop tunes for the dime store labels, which included Banner, Melotone, Oriole, Perfect, Romeo, Conqueror, and Vocalion.

For a short time in 1934, Morgan arranged for Fletcher Henderson's Orchestra. In 1935, he played trombone with the Original Dixieland Jazz Band when they recorded four sides for Vocalion. On September 12, 1935, Morgan, playing piano and Joe Venuti on violin recorded two sides for Brunswick: "Red Velvet" and "Black Satin". Most of the songs were written by Morgan and Venuti.

== Radio work ==
Morgan's biggest success came when he was offered the position of musical director for Detroit radio station WXYZ. His show, Music in the Morgan Manner, became one of the most popular radio shows. At one time during his radio run, he was directing nine commercial programs. While in Detroit, he did arranging for the Detroit 102 piece Symphony Orchestra.

In the early 1930s, Morgan was in an automobile accident that almost ended his career. After several months in the hospital, he started again in New York City as an arranger for the George White Scandals, the Cotton Club Revue, and the Capitol Theatre. When not arranging for the Broadway shows, Morgan worked as a pianist or trombonist with orchestras led by Phil Spitalny, Eddie Gilligan, Ted Fio Rito, and Freddy Martin.

Russ Morgan joined the Freddy Martin Orchestra in 1934 as a pianist but worked chiefly as a trombonist and arranger with the band. While with Martin's orchestra, he was music director at Brunswick in New York, where he met Shirley Gray, whom he married in 1939.

He hosted The Russ Morgan Show on the Mutual Broadcasting System beginning in September 1949. Originating from San Francisco, the show featured Morgan "as master of ceremonies of a program built around guest entertainers."

=== Mid-career ===
While at Brunswick, Morgan met Rudy Vallée, who was impressed with his ability. Vallée insisted he form an orchestra of his own. He then invited Morgan to appear as a guest on his popular Fleishman Yeast radio show. Vallée was instrumental in getting Morgan his first engagement in New York City, along with his own orchestra, at the Biltmore Hotel in February 1936. This first engagement was indicative of the audience's reaction to Morgan's appearances. He started with a four-week contract. The contract was extended, and Morgan remained at the hotel for two years. During the next few years, he was music director for the Rinso-Lifebuoy Show on NBC for thirty-nine weeks and the Philip Morris radio series on NBC and CBS for two years.

Russ Morgan's band had regular engagements at the Biltmore Hotel, Los Angeles; Claremont Hotel, Berkeley, California; Edgewater Beach Hotel, Chicago; Aragon and Trianon, Chicago; Strand, Chicago; the Statler Hotel, New York; Orpheum, Los Angeles; and the Palladium in Hollywood.

=== Chart success ===
In 1949, Morgan had four songs on the charts: "So Tired", "Cruising Down the River", "Sunflower", and "Forever and Ever".

Biggest hit singles
I'm in a Dancing Mood (vocal Red Jessup) (1936)
The Merry-Go-Round Broke Down (vocal Jimmy Lewis) (1937)
The Dipsy Doodle (vocal Jimmy Lewis) (1937)
I Double Dare You (vocal Bernice Parks) (1938)
Bei Mir Bist Du Schoen (vocal Bernice Parks) (1938)
I've Got a Pocketful of Dreams (vocal Russ Morgan) (1938)
The Lambeth Walk (vocal Jimmy Lewis) (1938)
Wishing (Will Make It So) (vocal Mert Curtis) (1939)
Somebody Else Is Taking My Place (vocal Morganaires) (1942)
Dance with a Dolly (vocal Al Jennings) (1944)
There Goes That Song Again (vocal Russ Morgan) (1944)
So Tired (vocal Russ Morgan) (1948)
Cruising Down the River (vocal Skylarks) (1949)
Sunflower (vocal Skylarks) (1949)
Forever and Ever (vocal Skylarks) (1949)

=== Late career and death ===
During the spring and summer of 1950 he hosted a televised version of In the Morgan Manner. The show originated from Chicago and was aired on the American Broadcasting Company (ABC) network. In 1953, Russ Morgan And His Orchestra released "The Tennessee Wig-Walk" as a single. Morgan had another TV program on CBS in 1956 with Helen O'Connell as the featured singer. In 1958, Morgan's nineteen-piece band had been reduced to eleven men, with his sons Jack Morgan on trombone and David Morgan on guitar. In 1965, he was booked for an eight-week engagement at the Top o' the Strip at the Dunes Hotel in Las Vegas. The engagement lasted until 1977.

Morgan died from a hemorrhagic stroke in 1969 in Las Vegas at the age of 65. His son Jack took over leadership of the band. Morgan has a star on the Hollywood Walk of Fame for his contributions to recording.

== Legacy ==
Russ Morgan's work lives on in many works of media. Much of his music is used in Analog Horror, such as in Vita Carnis. Leyland Kirby also sampled Morgan's songs in the album, Everywhere at the End of Time, an album that attempts to represent the stages of dementia, the most known/famous example being Libet's Delay, which samples "Goodnight, My Beautiful", and Childishly Fresh Eyes, which samples "Moonlight and Shadows". These songs are featured many times in different forms as the album progresses, eventually becoming corrupted to simulate the feeling of dementia.

Russ Morgan's "Were You Foolin'?" was also heavily popularized by the video game Ultrakill, where a 30-second loop of the instrumental plays in the background while the player is using a Terminal, though technically the song is credited under Bob Causer and His Cornellians (Russ' alias at the time).

Most of Morgan's most popular songs come from an album of previously unreleased songs that were released in 1978, nearly 10 years after his death. Among his most known songs are "Goodnight, My Beautiful", "Moonlight and Shadows", "So Tired", "Room With a View", "Moonlight Serenade", "To You", and "What Do You Know About Love?".
