= Rewind (The Wire) =

Annual year-in-review issue of The Wire

The Wire no. 263: the "2005 Rewind" issue

Rewind is the annual year-in-review issue of The Wire, a British music magazine founded in 1982. The year-end issues have been published every January since 1986, adopting the current "Rewind" title in 1997. Each year-end issue has included an annual critics' poll, collating critics' ballots into a list of the year's best releases. The polls survey writers affiliated with the magazine.

Across its history, critics' polls in The Wire have tended to reflect the magazine's eclectic, avant-garde sensibility and coverage of experimental music across a broad variety of genres. The magazine's first few polls were limited to selecting the best jazz LP of the year, in accordance with its original focus on jazz music. As the magazine's coverage expanded, it began incorporating other lists of the best albums in selected non-jazz genres, but kept the jazz poll at the centre. In 1990 the magazine had its first all-genre poll, and the following year the main poll opened to include albums from any musical genre. Beginning in 2011, the main poll expanded to encompass not only albums, but any musical release of any length in any conceivable format. Nevertheless, the poll has typically continued to emphasise releases from the album format above all others.

== History ==
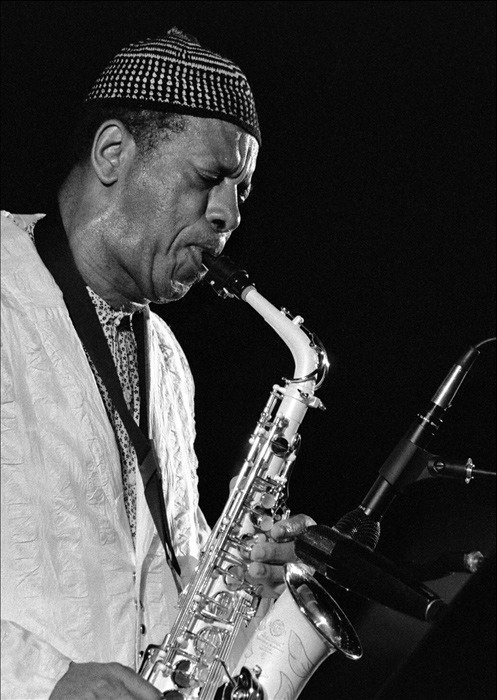
The American avant-garde jazz saxophonist Ornette Coleman topped The Wire's poll in two consecutive years.

=== 1985–1991: jazz era ===
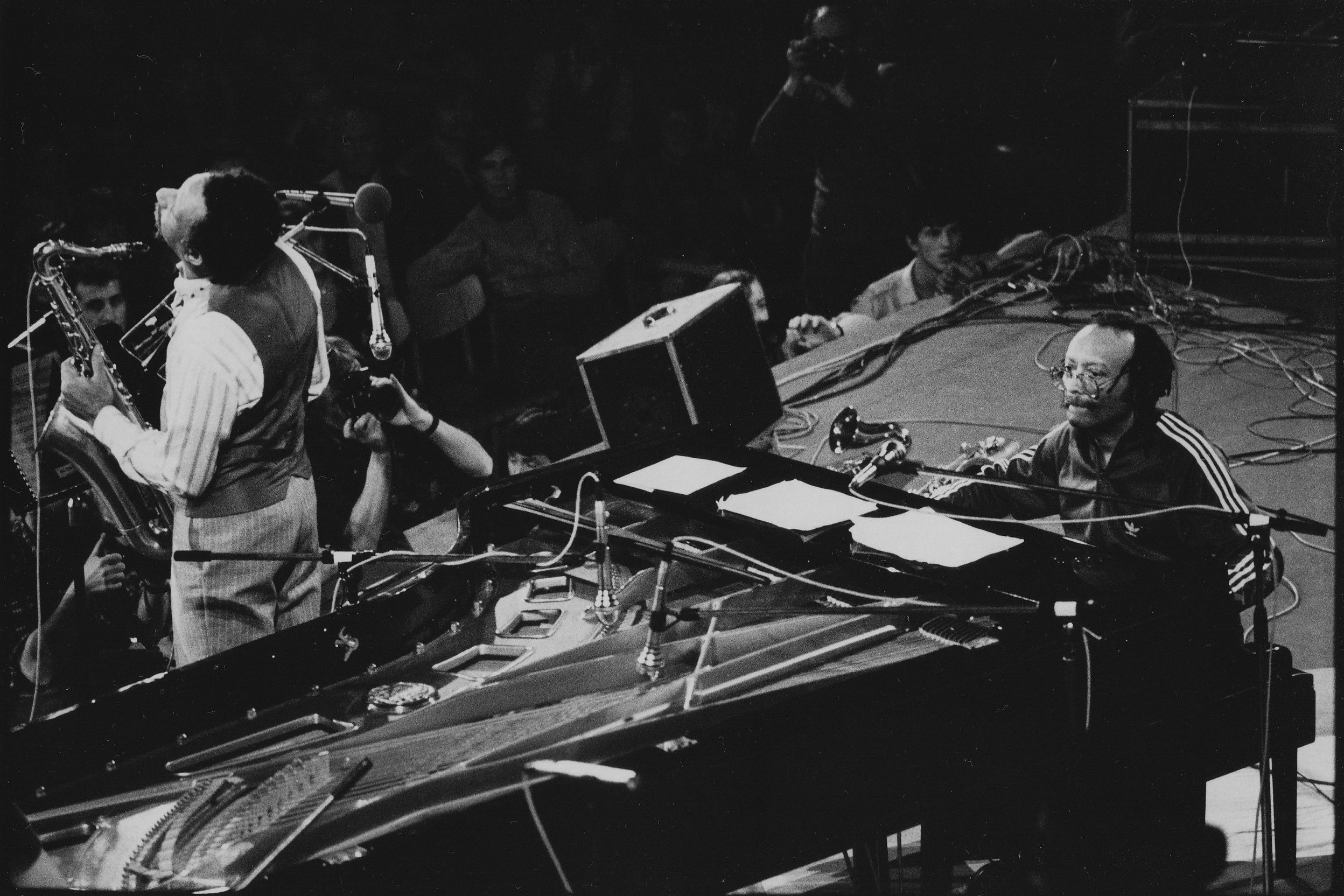
American jazz pianist Cecil Taylor (pictured at right) placed first in the 1988 poll and, in 1990, received a "special accolade" for a box set that would have otherwise topped the poll.

The early polls were limited to jazz albums, mirroring the magazine's focus at that time, but the purview gradually expanded; by 1990, the main jazz list was published alongside lists for blues, Latin music, "composition" (i.e., classical music) and "suspect rock" (i.e., experimental rock). The magazine published an all-genre poll for the first time in 1991, a so-called "open vote 'beyond' category" that was still subordinate to the "main" list of jazz and improvised releases. The Mix, a remix album by German electronic group Kraftwerk, was the first release to top an all-genre poll.

=== 1992–2010: Record of the Year ===
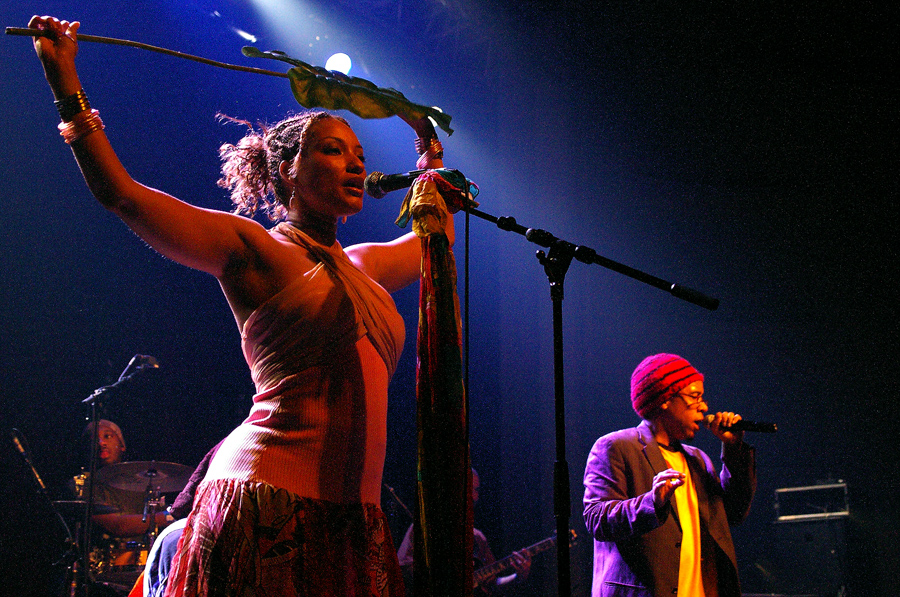
American hip-hop group Arrested Development topped the critics' poll in 1992, the first year that the magazine placed an all-genre list ahead of its jazz list.

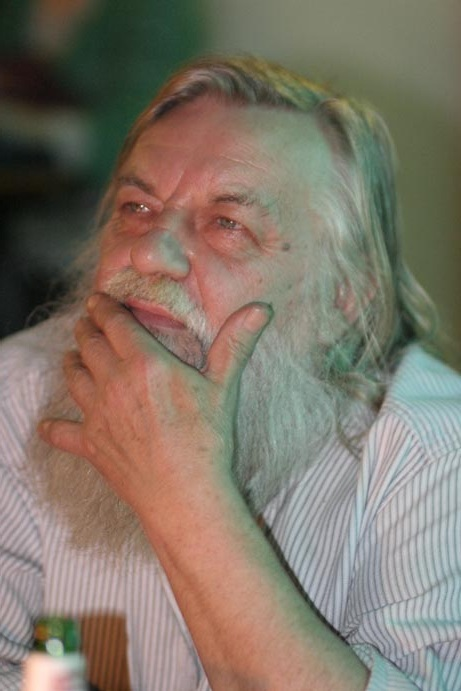
With three albums named Record of the Year, English musician Robert Wyatt has topped The Wire's poll more than any other artist.

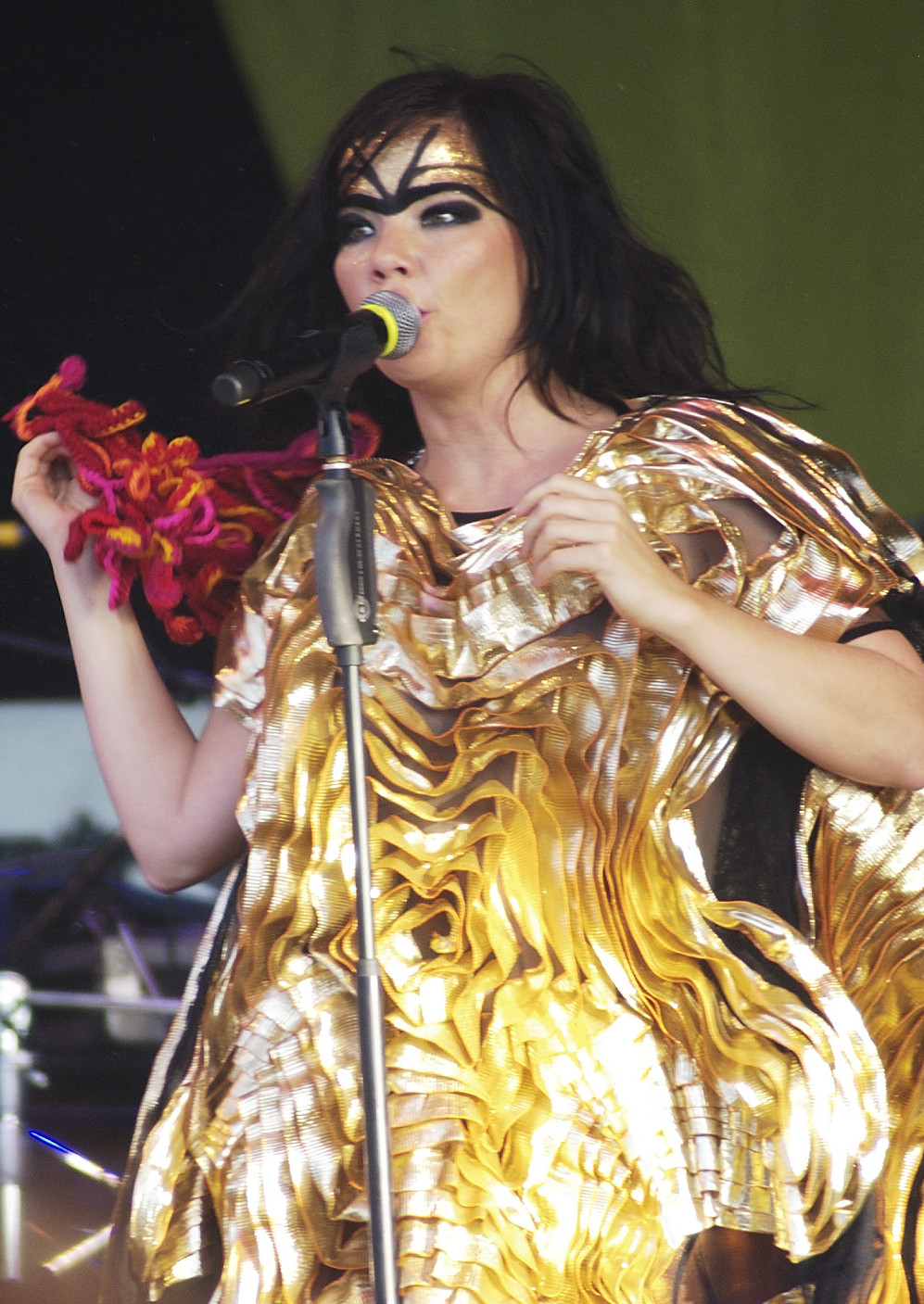
Two-time poll-topper Björk (pictured), an Icelandic musician, is one of only four artists from outside the Anglosphere to place first in the poll.

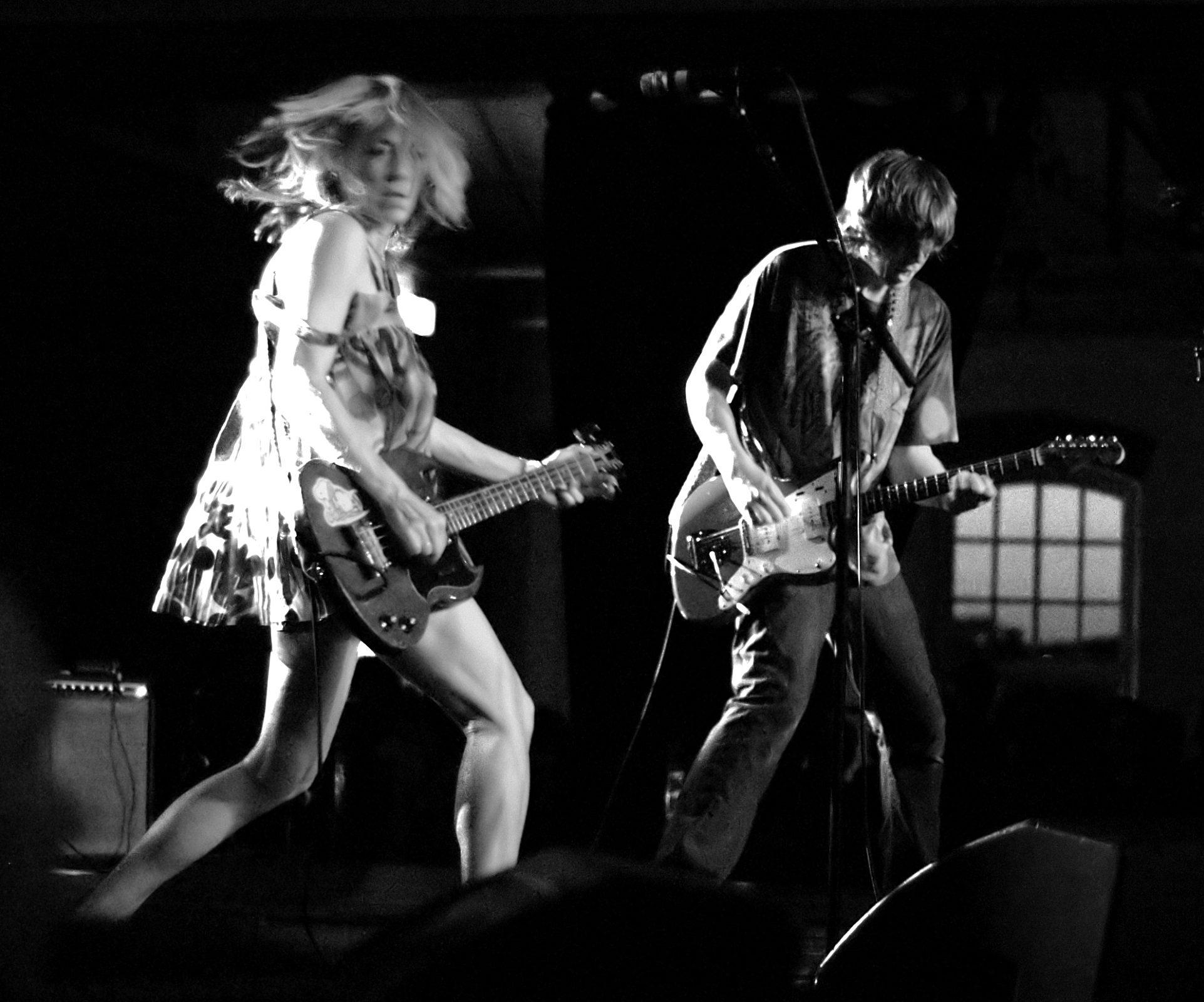
American rock band Sonic Youth topped the magazine's poll twice.

In 1992, The Wire stopped privileging its jazz poll and instead began to designate its all-genre poll as its primary year-end list. The blurb accompanying that year's poll announced that the "main chart takes the form of an all-inclusive, open-ended category—contributors were asked to vote for their favourite records across all genres, from jazz to Techno, opera to Africa, metal to Minimalism." The magazine continued to publish genre-specific lists, including for jazz. In 1993, The Wire started calling its all-genre poll the "Record of the Year".

=== 2011–present: Release of the Year ===
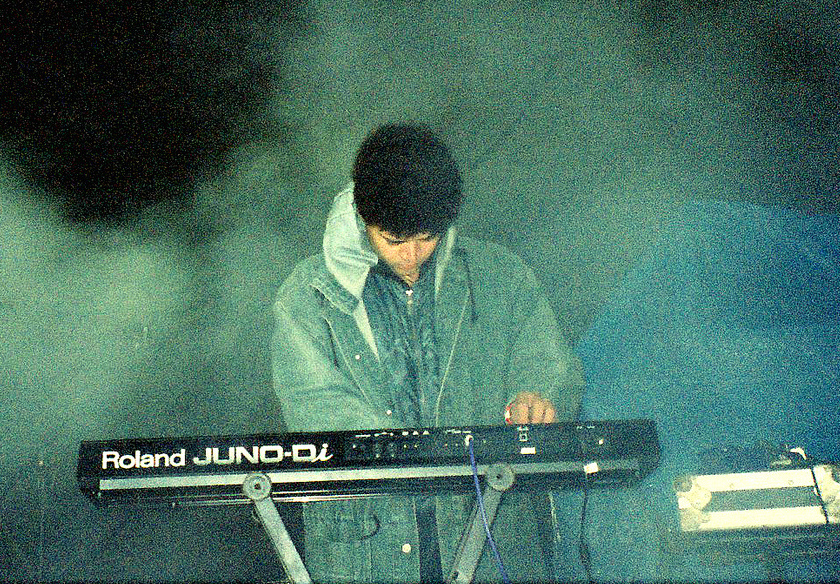
American musician James Ferraro's Far Side Virtual was the first winner of the expanded "Release of the Year" poll.

In 2011, The Wire switched the name of its annual critics' poll from Records of the Year to Releases of the Year. The change meant that critics could cast votes for "any self-contained audio entity, be it a vinyl LP, 12" EP, cassette, CD, download, mixtape, etc." Editor-in-chief Tony Herrington explained the reasoning and observed how it had changed critics' submissions:

We made the change in a spirit of 'all formats acknowledged' democracy, but while a few up-to-speed contributors took us at our word and ran with it, submitting Web 2.0-driven charts containing YouTube uploads and tracks given away via Twitter, the bulk of the electorate continued to cast their votes for old fashioned albums, records or otherwise."

The cover design for the 2017 Rewind—published January 2018, issue number 407—was a work of interactive audiovisual art. Using a custom augmented reality app, a smart device's camera would show the abstract magazine cover as a three-dimensional, with accompanying audio. The project was cited in the 2019 book The Fundamentals of Graphic Design as "an immersive and dynamic experience perfectly reflecting the publication's long-running championing of experimental approaches to making and performing music."

== Critics' polls ==
Year	Artist	Album	Musical genre	Nation	Poll name	Ref.
1985	Ronald Shannon Jackson	Decode Yourself	Avant-garde jazz	(United States); US	"LP of the Year"	
1986	Pat Metheny and Ornette Coleman	Song X	Avant-garde jazz	(United States); US	"LP of the Year"	
1987	Ornette Coleman	In All Languages	Avant-garde jazz	(United States); US	"Top LP of the Year"	
1988	Cecil Taylor Unit	Live in Bologna	Avant-garde jazz	(United States); US	"Top LP of the Year"	
1989	David Murray	Ming's Samba	Avant-garde jazz	(United States); US	"Critics' Poll"	
1990	John Scofield	Time on My Hands	Avant-garde jazz	(United States); US	"The Critics' Choice"	
1990	Cecil Taylor	Cecil Taylor in Berlin '88	Avant-garde jazz	(United States); US	"Special Wire Accolade" (Note: Several critics had voted for Cecil Taylor's 11-CD box set, In Berlin '88, as their number-one choice for the 1990 poll. However, it was kept off the main list altogether because, according to the introductory essay, "11 against one wasn't really fair odds for the rest". Instead, In Berlin '88 was separately "honoured ... with a special Wire accolade of the year's most impressive recording project.")	
1991	Sheila Jordan	Lost and Found	Avant-garde jazz	(United States); US	"The Critics' Choice: Jazz & Improvised"	
1991	Kraftwerk	The Mix	Electronic	(Germany); DEU	"The Critics' Choice: 'Beyond' Category"	
1992	Arrested Development	3 Years, 5 Months and 2 Days in the Life Of...	Alternative hip hop	(United States); US	"The Critics' Choice"	
1993	Björk	Debut	Electronic pop	(Iceland); ISL	"Record of the Year"	
1994	Portishead	Dummy	Trip hop	(United Kingdom); UK	"Record of the Year"	
1995	Tricky	Maxinquaye	Trip hop	(United Kingdom); UK	"Record of the Year"	
1996	Tortoise	Millions Now Living Will Never Die	Post-rock	(United States); US	"Record of the Year"	
1997	Robert Wyatt	Shleep	Art rock	(United Kingdom); UK	"Record of the Year"	
1998	Sonic Youth	A Thousand Leaves	Experimental rock	(United States); US	"Record of the Year"	
1999	Mouse on Mars	Niun Niggung	Electronic	(Germany); DEU	"Record of the Year"	
2000	Antipop Consortium	Tragic Epilogue	Alternative hip hop	(United States); US	"Record of the Year"	
2001	Björk	Vespertine	Electronic pop	(Iceland); ISL	"Record of the Year"	
2002	Sonic Youth	Murray Street	Experimental rock	(United States); US	"Record of the Year"	
2003	Robert Wyatt	Cuckooland	Art rock	(United Kingdom); UK	"Record of the Year"	
2004	Albert Ayler	Holy Ghost: Rare & Unissued Recordings (1962–70)	Avant-garde jazz	(United States); US	"Record of the Year"	
2005	The Books	Lost and Safe	Folktronica	(United States); US	"Record of the Year"	
2006	Burial	Burial	Dubstep	(United Kingdom); UK	"Record of the Year"	
2007	Robert Wyatt	Comicopera	Art rock	(United Kingdom); UK	"Record of the Year"	
2008	The Bug	London Zoo	Dubstep	(United Kingdom); UK	"Record of the Year"	
2009	Broadcast and The Focus Group	... Investigate Witch Cults of the Radio Age	Psychedelic pop and sampledelia	(United Kingdom); UK	"Record of the Year"	
2010	Actress	Splazsh	Tech house	(United Kingdom); UK	"Record of the Year"	
2011	James Ferraro	Far Side Virtual	Vaporwave	(United States); US	"Release of the Year"	
2012	Laurel Halo	Quarantine	Avant-pop	(United States); US	"Release of the Year"	
2013	Julia Holter	Loud City Song	Avant-pop	(United States); US	"Release of the Year"	
2014	Aphex Twin	Syro	Electronic	(United Kingdom); UK	"Release of the Year"	
2015	Jlin	Dark Energy	Footwork	(United States); US	"Release of the Year"	
2016	David Bowie	Blackstar (★)	Art rock	(United Kingdom); UK	"Release of the Year"	
2017	Chino Amobi	Paradiso	Sound collage	(United States); US	"Release of the Year"	
2018	Sons of Kemet	Your Queen Is a Reptile	Avant-garde jazz	(United Kingdom); UK	"Release of the Year"	
2019	75 Dollar Bill	I Was Real	Psychedelic rock	(United States); US	"Release of the Year"	
2020	Beatrice Dillon	Workaround	Electronic	(United Kingdom); UK	"Release of the Year"	
2021	L'Rain	Fatigue	Avant-pop	(United States); US	"Release of the Year"	
2022	Lucrecia Dalt	¡Ay!	Avant-pop	Colombia	"Release of the Year"	
2023	Yo La Tengo	This Stupid World	Indie rock	(United States); US	"Release of the Year"	

== See also ==
- Pazz & Jop – a critics' poll conducted by The Village Voice
- HMV's Poll of Polls – music retailer HMV's aggregate year-end poll compiling various publications' polls (including The Wire's), published from 1998–2012
