= In Situ (EP) =

EP by Laurel Halo
- Released: September 25, 2015
- Length: 35:48
- Label: Honest Jon's

Laurel Halo chronology
Chance of Rain (2013)	In Situ (2015)	Dust (2017)

In Situ is an EP by American musician Laurel Halo. It was released on September 25, 2015, through Honest Jon's. It received generally favorable reviews from critics.

== Background ==
Laurel Halo is an American musician from Ann Arbor, Michigan. She released Quarantine and Chance of Rain through Hyperdub. In Situ is a double EP, consisting of eight tracks. All tracks are instrumental. The EP's title comes from in situ, a Latin phrase meaning "in its original place." The EP was released on September 25, 2015, through Honest Jon's.

== Critical reception ==
Professional ratings
Aggregate scores
Source	Rating
Metacritic	73/100
Review scores
Source	Rating
AllMusic	3.5/5 stars
Resident Advisor	3.7/5
Spin	8/10
Tiny Mix Tapes	3/5 stars
XLR8R	7/10

According to the review aggregator Metacritic, In Situ received "generally favorable reviews" based on a weighted average score of 73 out of 100 from 5 critic scores.

Heather Phares of AllMusic wrote, "the set finds her taking a technical, almost scientific approach to experimental techno." Glenn Jackson of Resident Advisor stated, "Live manipulation gives In Situ its textures, as Halo hardly lets a few bars go by without tweaking rhythmic elements, introducing new sonics or briefly leaning on an effect." He added, "The movements are unpredictable but never distracting or overwhelming." DeForrest Brown of XLR8R commented that "In Situ is ultimately beautiful in design, and speaks quite a bit to where Laurel could potentially go, now that she's spent some time exploring her understanding of sound design and club music."

== Track listing ==
In Situ track listing
No.	Title	Length
1.	"Situation"	4:29
2.	"Leaves"	3:19
3.	"Nebenwirkungen"	5:00
4.	"Drift"	5:02
5.	"Nah"	3:49
6.	"Shake"	4:05
7.	"Nimrud"	1:41
8.	"Focus I"	8:23
Total length:		35:48

== Personnel ==
Credits adapted from liner notes.

- Laurel Halo
- Phillip Aumann – photography
