= Laurel Halo =

American electronic musician

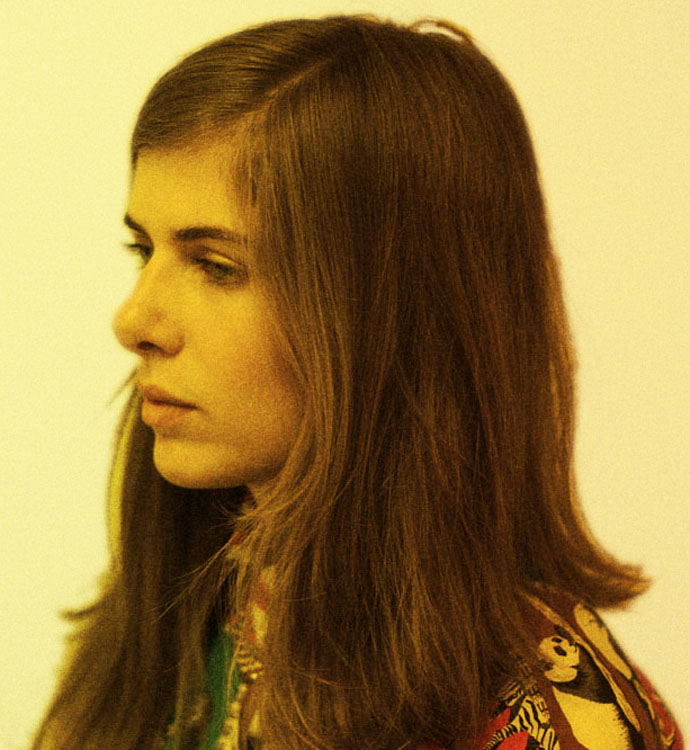
- Halo in 2010

Background information
- Born: Laurel Anne Chartow; June 3, 1985 (age 40); Ann Arbor, Michigan, U.S.
- Genres: Electronic; avant-pop; ambient; experimental; techno
- Occupations: composer; producer; musician; DJ
- Instruments: piano; guitar; violin; synthesizer; sampler; drum machine
- Years active: 2006–present
- Labels: Latency; Hyperdub; Honest Jon's; Livity Sound; !K7; The Vinyl Factory; Hippos in Tanks
- Website: www.laurelhalo.com

Laurel Anne Chartow (born June 3, 1985), known professionally as Laurel Halo, is an American electronic musician currently based in Los Angeles, California. She released her debut album Quarantine on Hyperdub in 2012 to critical acclaim; it was named album of the year by The Wire.

== Early life ==
Laurel Anne Chartow was born on June 3, 1985, in Ann Arbor, Michigan, where she also grew up and learned to play the piano, guitar, and violin. She draws influences from the music of Detroit, London, and Berlin, as well as from her time in free jazz ensembles and as a college radio DJ. She moved to New York City in 2009, to Berlin in 2013, and to Los Angeles in 2023.

== Career ==
=== 2010s ===
Halo's debut album, Quarantine, was released on the London-based label Hyperdub in June 2012. The album was named Album of the Year in 2012 by The Wire. Halo also released the Behind the Green Door EP, as well her second album, Chance of Rain, on Hyperdub in 2013.

In 2015, Halo released In Situ, a double-EP for the London-based label Honest Jon's. Also that year, she worked alongside Rashad Becker, Julia Holter, and NH'Koxyen on the collaborative, 'telepathic' Terepa EP, in addition to recording a cover of a previously lost Karen Dalton song for the Tompkins Square compilation, Remembering Mountains. 2015 also saw Halo collaborate with John Cale and Lisa Gerrard for a performance of Cale's music at the Arts Centre Melbourne.

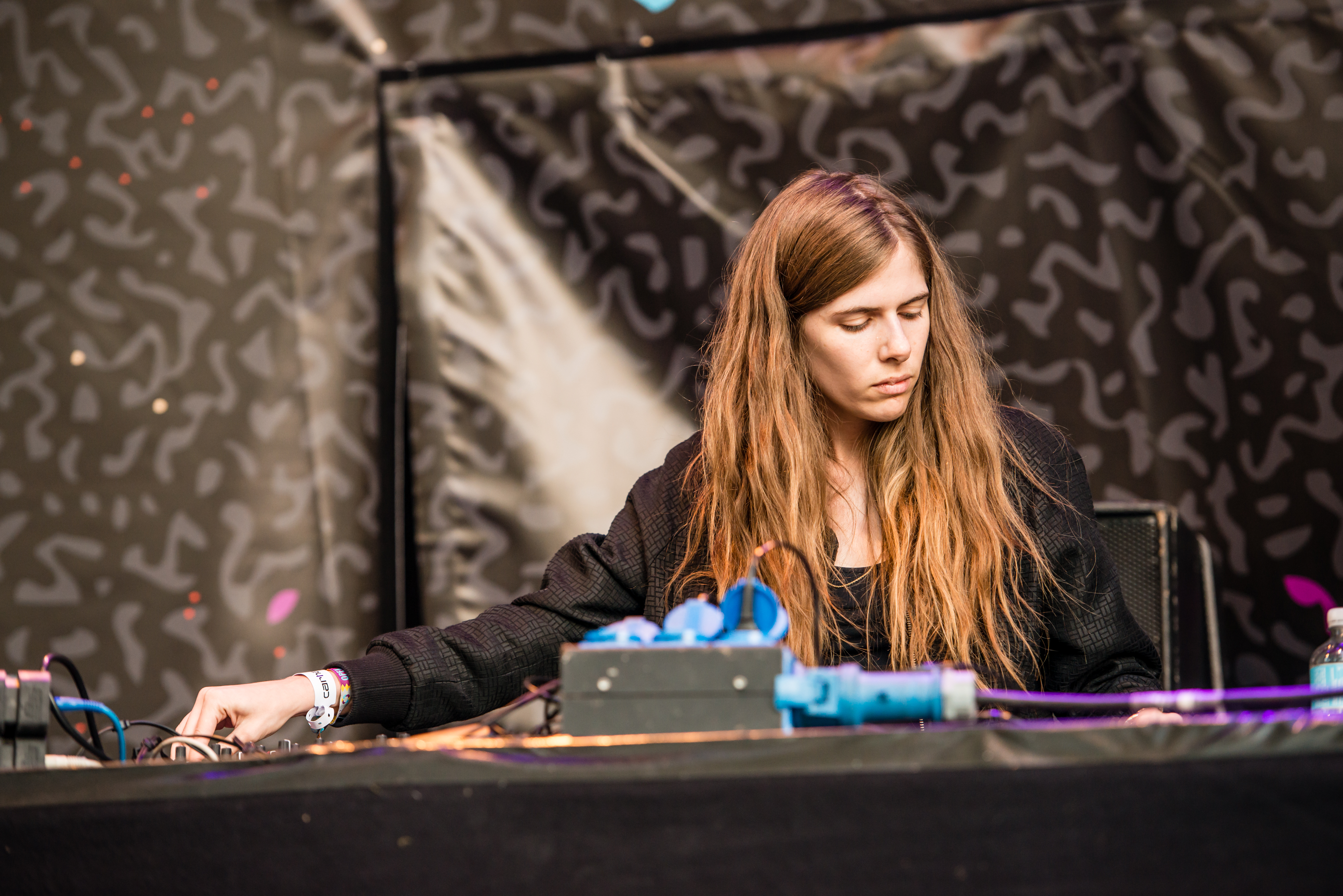
Halo performing in 2015

In 2016, Halo composed the soundtrack for Still Be Here, a collaborative piece featuring the Japanese virtual pop star Hatsune Miku jointly commissioned by CTM/Transmediale. It premiered at HKW in Berlin, Germany.

In June 2017, Halo released her third album Dust on Hyperdub, featuring contributions from Eli Keszler, Julia Holter, Michael Salu, Max D, Klein, and Lafawndah, among others. The album received critical praise from numerous publications.

In January 2018, it was announced that Halo wrote a score for the documentary film Possessed by Dutch design studio Metahaven and Rob Schröder. Later that year in July, she released a mini-album on Parisian label Latency Recordings entitled Raw Silk Uncut Wood, which she stated was inspired by her contribution to the film. The mini-album consists of six instrumental ambient tracks, and features contributions from cellist Oliver Coates, whom she also worked with on the Possessed score, and percussionist Eli Keszler. Halo also teamed up with Bristol-based musician Hodge on the collaborative EP Tru / Opal / The Light Within You, which was released on November 30, 2018, by Livity Sound Recordings.

In February 2019, Halo provided the soundtrack for Eckhaus Latta's Fall 2019 runway at New York Fashion Week. March 2019 Halo released the 68th edition of the DJ-Kicks mix series on !K7, followed by an extensive world DJ tour. In fall 2019 Halo curated the programming for London multidisciplinary event series MODE, featuring artists such as Julia Holter, Kali Malone, Gas, and Éliane Radigue.

=== 2020s ===
In April 2020, Halo's original score for Possessed was released by The Vinyl Factory. In October 2020, Halo walked for Chloé's Spring 2021 runway show at Paris Fashion Week.

January 2021 saw her announce the label Awe as an outlet for her solo and collaborative work. Since January 2021, Halo has held a monthly NTS residency under the same name, featuring guests such as Kode9, Mica Levi, TTB, and Aya. In August 2021, the Moritz von Oswald Trio released an album, Dissent, which alongside von Oswald featured Halo and jazz percussionist Heinrich Köbberling.

In March 2022, Halo composed the score to Cecilie Bahnsen's Fall/Winter 2022 runway show at Paris Fashion Week, which featured a poem by Tove Ditlevsen recited by artist Puce Mary. In April 2022, Halo premiered a new multichannel work for piano and electronics, entitled Octavia, commissioned by Ina-GRM and presented at the Maison de la Radio in Paris. Octavia was released in April 2024 on the Portraits GRM record series, as a split with Jessica Ekomane's Manifolds. In October 2022, Smalltown Supersound released Norwegian free jazz pianist Anja Lauvdal's debut solo album, From a Story Now Lost, which featured Halo as main producer.

In January 2023, Halo joined the Composition and Experimental Sound Practices faculty of The Herb Alpert School of Music at CalArts. In September 2023, Halo released her fifth album, Atlas on her record label, Awe. The album featured contributions from Bendik Giske, Lucy Railton, Coby Sey, and James Underwood. The album was critically successful, rated an 8.1 by Pitchfork and named 2023 Album of the Year by Boomkat.

== Discography ==
=== Studio albums ===
Title	Album details
Quarantine	Released: May 21, 2012; Label: Hyperdub; Formats: CD, LP, digital download
Chance of Rain	Released: October 28, 2013; Label: Hyperdub; Formats: CD, LP, digital download
Dust	Released: June 23, 2017; Label: Hyperdub; Formats: CD, LP, digital download
Raw Silk Uncut Wood	Released: July 13, 2018; Label: Latency; Formats: LP, digital download
Atlas	Released: September 22, 2023; Label: Awe; Formats: CD, LP, digital download
Octavia	Released: March 1, 2024; Label: Shelter Press / Portraits GRM; Formats: LP, digital download; Split with Jessica Ekomane's Manifolds

=== Soundtrack releases ===
Title	Album details
Possessed (Soundtrack to the Film by Metahaven & Rob Schröder)	Released: April 10, 2020; Label: The Vinyl Factory; Formats: LP, digital download

=== EPs ===
Title	EP details
King Felix	Released: November 30, 2010; Label: Hippos in Tanks; Formats: 12", digital download
Hour Logic	Released: June 21, 2011; Label: Hippos in Tanks; Formats: 12", digital download
Antenna	Released: November 5, 2011; Label: NNA Tapes; Formats: CS, digital download
Behind the Green Door	Released: May 20, 2013; Label: Hyperdub; Formats: 12", digital download
In Situ	Released: September 25, 2015; Label: Honest Jon's; Formats: CD, 2x12", digital download
Tru / Opal / The Light Within You (with Hodge)	Released: November 30, 2018; Label: Livity Sound; Formats: 12", digital download

=== Singles ===
Title	Year	Album
"Sunlight on the Faded"	2012	Non-album single
"Jelly" (feat. Lafawndah and Klein)	2017	Dust
"Belleville" (feat. Coby Sey)	2023	Atlas

=== Remixes ===
Title	Year	Artist
"Casual Diamond"	2011	Sleep ∞ Over
"Work, Live & Sleep in Collapsing Space"	2012	Kuedo
"Living With You"	2013	John Cale
"Blue Scene"	2018	Helm
"Throw"	2018	Forest Swords
"Die 4 You"	2018	Perfume Genius
"Niagara" (Laurel Halo "Lilith" Mix)	2019	Tashi Wada
"Lon Lon Night Vision"	2019	Wilted Woman
"Young Lover"	2019	St. Vincent
"Sleeve"	2019	LYZZA
"Another Thing"	2019	Homeshake
"Phantoms of Dreamland"	2020	Michal Turtle
"Opening"	2021	Bruce Brubaker & Max Cooper
"Steel"	2021	Swim Mountain
"You, At The End"	2021	Lafawndah
"Cruising"	2021	Bendik Giske
"Deadlock"	2021	Scalping
"Kerlann"	2022	Yann Tiersen

=== Guest appearances ===
Title	Year	Artist(s)	Album
"Strawberry Skies" (featuring Laurel Halo)	2010	Games	That We Can Play
"Mist of Time" (featuring Laurel Halo)	2012	Teengirl Fantasy	Tracer
"Blue Notion"	2015	—N/a	Remembering Mountains: Unheard Songs by Karen Dalton
"Workaround Two"	2020	Beatrice Dillon	Workaround
"Mercy"	2023	John Cale	Mercy

=== Collaborations ===
- FRKWYS Vol. 7 LP (as Borden, Ferraro, Godin, Halo and Lopatin) (RVNG Intl., 2011)
- Terepa EP (as Terepa) (Other People, 2015)
- Dissent LP (as Moritz von Oswald Trio) (Modern Recordings, 2021)

=== As producer ===
- Anja Lauvdal - From A Story Now Lost LP (Smalltown Supersound, 2022)
