= Channel Pressure =

Studio album by Ford & Lopatin
- Released: June 7, 2011
- Recorded: November 2010–January 2011
- Studio: Gary's Electric in Brooklyn, New York
- Genre: Synth-funk; experimental; electronic; synthpop; post-pop
- Length: 37:23
- Label: Software
- Producer: Daniel Lopatin; Joel Ford

Ford & Lopatin chronology
That We Can Play (2010)	Channel Pressure (2011)

Singles from Channel Pressure
- 1. "Emergency Room" Released: April 25, 2011; 2. "Too Much MIDI (Please Forgive Me)" Released: June 13, 2011

Channel Pressure is the debut studio album of electronic music duo Ford & Lopatin, consisting of producers Daniel Lopatin (a.k.a. Oneohtrix Point Never) and Joel Ford. Following the group's abandonment of their previous name "Games" for legal reasons, they recorded the album at Gary's Electric Studios in Brooklyn, New York. It was released on June 7, 2011 as the first album to be issued on Software, Lopatin's own label under the Mexican Summer imprint.

Channel Pressure is a concept album about a teen named Joey Rogers who is brainwashed by voices from a supercomputer. Musically, the album draws on an eclectic variety of 1980s music styles, including electropop, white soul, R&B, jazz fusion, and new age, as well as cluttered and improved quality production techniques than heard on their previous releases. It features production and vocal contributions from Al Carlson, Autre Ne Veut, and Jeff Gitelman.

The album was promoted with two singles, "Emergency Room" and "Too Much MIDI (Please Forgive Me)." Channel Pressure garnered favorable reviews from professional music journalists upon its release, and was number 18 on a year-end list of the best albums of 2011 by Gorilla vs. Bear.

== Background and production ==
Ford & Lopatin formed in 2009 under the moniker Games. Their debut record That We Can Play (2010) was an extended play that was produced by recording and editing one single stereo Pro Tools improv jam. In an August 2010 interview, Ford said that he had recently met in Brooklyn with Jan Hammer's son, who was a fan of the Tigercity project, so he could talk about recording the synths for Games' first full-length album at Hammer's studio in upstate New York, and announced they would begin recording the LP at the studio in December: "We're honing in [sic] on the concept still, but it definitely involves athletic cuts and smooth jazz-fusion."

In the fall of 2010, Keith Abrahamsson and Andres Santo Domingo, founders of the imprint Mexican Summer, had a conversation with Ford and Lopatin where they suggested that the group form a new label and studio under Mexican Summer. In February 2011, the duo changed their name to Ford & Lopatin, reportedly to preempt legal issues with the Interscope Records artist Game, and started the label Software under Mexican Summer; Channel Pressure was Software's first release. Like That We Can Play, Channel Pressure was produced with the software Pro Tools. However, it was recorded in a much bigger studio with more advanced equipment, meaning the recording of the jam sessions involved instruments that were signaled to multiple channels instead of just one track all together like That We Can Play, which led to many more possibilities in how each song would be crafted and edited.

Lopatin said his use of the program for making Channel Pressure increased his comfort and familiarity with the program. He described the development process as "kind of a White Album thing going on where some songs were more driven by Joel, some by me. But whatever ideas were on the table, both of us were kind of throwing a lot of stuff together." The Gaia synth by Roland was used to achieve what he called "the weird scat dad sounds": "It's definitely like we wanted to do almost this J-pop, cartoony thing and to have this overload of interesting synth moments, Thomas Dolby style, where he's showing you all these little strange [...] but in a fun way that's not wanky, being a zoo of little synth emotions and shapes."

== Composition ==
The style of Channel Pressure was described by Beats per Minute as a mixture of "80s throwback electropop, happy hooks, new-aged tinged video game overworld themes, Rhythm Nation-era industrial R&B, and a liberally applied layer of synthy cheese" and by Spin magazine as pastiche in the vein of Ariel Pink. Some critics noted the record's glitchy and hectic arrangements and sound structures. AllMusic described the album as "blurring the boundaries between brittle digi-funk, gooey, soft-focus R & B, wonky fusion jazz, noodly electro-prog, and chintzy new age." Scott Morrow of Alarm magazine categorized the album as a "modern and experimental twist" of 1980s music and described the sound as "Prefuse 73 twisting around the Miami Vice theme." In the words of Patrick Hajduch, another Alarm magazine journalist, Channel Pressure is a "jittery, looped amalgam of trashy ’80s vibes" where instrument and vocal recordings are decreased in sample rate, "deconstructed," and "smashed back together;" the record has a "smooth ’80s sound and quasi-R&B song structures" that contradict its "crazy programming."

The hectic sound editing is most prevalent in the instrumental facet of the album, where, as Conrad Tao of Sputnikmusic explained, "layers build upon one another and drop out without warning, beats appear out of nowhere, and flangers are employed liberally." PopMatters critic Richard Elliott noted a "stutter of the past" in the album's drum parts which was a symbol of the "general battle between analog and digital, “real” and synthesized, that occupied so much of that era’s aesthetics."

As Becker analyzed, the use of vocals on Channel Pressure makes the album "a collection of pop songs rather than yet another instrumental so-old-it’s-new electronic album." Joel Ford sings in a falsetto in the style of Green Gartside, Jimmy Somerville, and Lewis Taylor, and his vocals are filtered with auto-tune. Tao described the singing as "creepily emotionless" and "purposefully robotic, acting as the voice of God if God sounded like a male version of GLaDOS;" he analyzes that the robotic aspect of the singing gives "the knowingly cheesy melodies a welcome (if superficial) feeling of gravitas."

== Concept ==
Channel Pressure is a concept album imagined as a retrofuturistic story that takes place in the year 2082. Combining elements of the plots of WarGames (1983), Tron (1982), and Donnie Darko (2001), the story involves a "mild-mannered" teenaged antihero named Joey Rogers who is brainwashed by several voices transmitted to his subconscious by a record industry-controlling supercomputer named System II from a television while he's asleep. The voices control him to break into a music equipment store. Rowan Savage found this story similar to Victor Tausk's concept of the "influencing machine" that controls the human. He explained that the frequent number of references to television in the lyrics "locate the album somewhere between the technology of the past and that of the future, between 1984 and the virtualized separation of image from machine." Ford & Lopatin conceived the idea of the Joey Rogers character while riding a bus to Boston, Massachusetts.

== Tracks ==
Channel Pressure opens with "Scumsoft", where Rogers, while clicking through channels on the television, is possessed by snippets of demonic shows. The track is a montage of samples from randomly-chosen YouTube videos Lopatin played through Al Carlson's tape echo filter. Lopatin jokingly described YouTube as the "second-best synth" used for the making of the album, being topped by the Roland Jupiter-8. Heems from the alternative hip hop group Das Racist recorded a full verse for the album, but only a part of it was used and was featured near the end of "Scumsoft". Channel Pressure's title track, described by Lopatin as "one of the more developed Jupiter 8 MIDI jams", introduces the supercomputer System II that brainwashes Rogers throughout the album. In this track, the computer is voiced by Mexican Summer staff member Julia Krivonos. The Omnisphere strings that play during the song's chorus were added by Ford and Lopatin after the mixing was done, which angered Guillermo. Dried, ominous dub-esque soundscapes, a ska-influenced guitar played by Jeff Gitelman, and a repeating flute trill riff performing a riff a la the theme for The Good, The Bad, and The Ugly are also present in the instrumentation.

"Emergency Room" was Channel Pressure's lead single, released on April 25, 2011. It's a joyous track that Pitchfork's Zach Kelly compared to "forgotten B-movie soundtracks from the decade of excess" and Ken Taylor of XLR8R the works of Oingo Boingo. In the middle of the track's running time, Gitelman's jazz metal-style guitar solo is performed with inharmonious vocal stabs in the background. All of the sporadic instances are calmed when Ford sings "Although I'm dinged up, voices are going away." The song's Roland D-50 bass riff was compared by Kelly to that of the Gary Numan song "Cars". In "Rock Center Paranoia", which Lopatin called a "fake metal jam," Rogers has an anxiety attack in a music equipment shop. The song features a Minimoog the duo bought from the door next to where they were recording Channel Pressure, as well as another guitar part from Gitelman where he is "shredding seventh-grade style."

"Too Much MIDI (Please Forgive Me)" was Channel Pressure's second single; it was the first of ten tracks to be issued under Adult Swim's 2011 Singles Program. Upon its June 13, 2011 release under the program, it received the label of "Best New Track" from a review of the track by Kelly for Pitchfork. The track depicts Rogers as excited to record an album in his own dreamland while riding in a hatchback on an elevated interstate. It starts out as a lament sounding like what Lopatin described as a "subterranean S&M steam world", musically arranged with "alien-sounding" synthesizers and sounds commonly found in Industrial music. It then turns into an "archetypal synth pop banger" with synth stabs reminiscent of those in Prince and The Revolution's "Purple Rain" and "deliciously cheesy guitar wailing," Kelly analyzed. Savage compared its instrumental to New Order's "Blue Monday", and noted its "fretless bass aesthetic characteristic" similar to that of musician Mick Karn.

As Ford and Lopatin's "secret recipe", most of the songs written for Channel Pressure, started out as smooth jazz songs before Ford and Lopatin began experimenting with them. The making of "New Planet" is the best example of this process; Ford and Lopatin built the track around fretless bass guitar lead melodies and synth pads, and Prefuse 73, in the duo's words, "took this one above the clouds." Jokingly described by Ford and Lopatin as "our sweet ELO ripoff jam," "The Voices" lyrically has a double meaning; the song is about Roger hearing voices, but at the same time it also talks about earworms the narrator hates to have in his brain. Despite the track's glitchy sound, the song also contains elements of pop music that gives it a mournful, scented tone. It is followed by the theme song for and named after Joey Rogers, which is about needing System II to produce the record he wants make that, in Ford's words, "dominates his dreams."

"Dead Jammer" was described by Ford as "ambient John McLaughlin meets Jerry Garcia and Steve Roach." Jan Hammer's signature arpeggiated synthesizer riffs and tape echos are present on the track, as well as guitar work from Tigercity's Andrew Brady. It was described by Marrow as a "polyrhythmic yet relaxing mixture where the guitar, bass, and programmed sounds all do different things." "Break Inside", labeled "the Babyface jam" during development, features Autre Ne Veut and Gitelman singing the same lead vocal melody in different styles, while Ford acts as "weird computer glue holding them together," Lopatin said. Categorized as a "lover's Casio reggae" song by Lopatin, "I Surrender" is another track on Channel Pressure featuring vocals from Autre Ne Veut. The song is followed by "Green Fields", another Hammer-influenced cut on Channel Pressure. Musically influenced from Yello's song "Oh Yeah" that Ford and Lopatin heard on a Twix television advertisement, "World of Regret" is the part of the album's story where Rogers' "hedonistic last supper" takes place, with a choir of "dads" attending it. Channel Pressure close with "G's Dream."

== Critical reception ==
Professional ratings
Aggregate scores
Source	Rating
AnyDecentMusic?	7.4/10
Metacritic	78/100
Review scores
Source	Rating
AllMusic	4/5 stars
Beats per Minute	73%
DIY	8/10
Pitchfork	7.5/10
PopMatters	9/10
Spin	8/10
Sputnikmusic	4/5
Tiny Mix Tapes	4/5 discs
Under the Radar	7/10 stars
XLR8R	6/10

Channel Pressure earned moderately positive reviews upon its release. PopMatters critic Richard Elliot wrote a highly favorable review of the record, calling it "a work of heroic heritage—reorganizing an era that is too often dismissed as sterile and empty" and a record that "gets better with every play, with every peeling back of its more obvious, glossy layers." He analyzed that the LP was "far from being subject to a nostalgia for inauthenticity, or a desire for style over content," and the duo "get involved in the labor of memory work, piecing together textures and re-composing slabs of sound in ways that challenge and change their original logic." He also highlighted how the "broken" and unstable arrangements of the tracks are made into "magical pop sounds." K. Ross Hoffman, a journalist for AllMusic, compared it to Neon Neon's album Stainless Style (2008), writing that Channel Pressure "is equally enjoyable as a painstaking period re-creation drenched in neon nostalgia and nylon nausea, and as a piece of sterling (if decidedly warped) electronic pop music in its own right." He praised the duo's ability of making sounds from music of the 1980s "feel surprisingly fresh, thanks to their obvious affection for the material and their equally devoted attention to songs [...] and sounds."

Larry Fitzmaurice called Channel Pressure "overstuffed and ridiculous, but also an enticing invitation to plug in and drop out." He praised the vocals and "merely functional" instrumentals, opining that they help "keep the balance right," as well as the old-era-style songwriting. Savage described Channel Pressure as a "creation that is equal parts experimentation and familiarity, cheese sincerity, teen affect, cultural diagnostics, and a liberal streak of naïve charm." He highlighted how the melodies "won’t impress themselves instantly upon the consciousness but rather work their way into it," which was clever given the album's concept about computers manipulating the behavior of a human. Hajduch praised Channel Pressure as "something strange and pretty universally likable at the same time" and one of the few records to properly homage music from the 1980s. Reviewing for Exclaim!, Cam Lindsay honored the album for being "shrewd" and accessible to many listeners while still being complex. The LP later made it to number 16 on the publication's list of the "20 Best Dance & Electronic Albums of 2011." Tao highlighted the complexity of the sounds used in the album, which helped make it worth repeated listens given that the lyrics mostly has "vague references to the album's concept or express some generic sentiment along the lines of "Big Brother is watching"."

In a more mixed review, writer Ben Schumer felt that while the LP was "enjoyable," it was nothing "more than a time capsule." He also noted that listeners of works under the Oneohtrix Point Never project would be "shocked by how goofy the dark synth lord can get." Becker called it "an undeniably fun ride through EPCOT-themed dreams and technological mysticism," describing it as like "candy; it’s not great for you, but it tastes delicious and goes down easy." However, he also compared it to Lopatin's album Returnal (2010), which was released a year before, and the works of Joel Vandroogenbroeck and Software acts Peter Mergener and Michael Weisser, who produced music in the same style as Channel Pressure more than 20 years prior. He opined that in those regards, "much of Channel Pressure plays disappointingly safe." Taylor found the LP to be inferior to the previous release of the project That We Can Play (2010); he opined that the duo's self-aware and "over-studied" take on 1980s music as well as the "focused and [..] over-thought songwriting and production" on Channel Pressure was at the expense of That We Can Play's "welcome looseness." He felt that this led to "too many cultural cues being thrown our way." He overall described the record as "dated, but not in a good way." Channel Pressure was number 18 on Gorilla vs. Bear's list of the best albums of 2011.

== Track listing ==
Derived from Channel Pressure.

No.	Title	Length
1.	"Scumsoft"	0:40
2.	"Channel Pressure"	3:02
3.	"Emergency Room"	3:33
4.	"Rock Center Paronoia"	1:21
5.	"Too Much MIDI (Please Forgive Me)"	4:14
6.	"New Planet"	3:22
7.	"The Voices"	3:00
8.	"Joey Rogers"	3:43
9.	"Dead Jammer"	2:16
10.	"Break Inside"	4:50
11.	"I Surrender"	3:14
12.	"Green Fields"	0:53
13.	"World Of Regret"	2:42
14.	"G's Dream"	0:41
Total length:		37:23

== Personnel ==
Derived from the liner notes of Channel Pressure.

Recorded at Gary's Electric Studio in Brooklyn, New York from November 2010 to January 2011 and mastered by Joe LaPorta at The Lodge in New York City.

- Joel Ford - synthesizers, writing, production, vocals (except "Joey Rogers" and "I Surrender"), drum programming
- Daniel Lopatin - synthesizers, writing, production, additional drum programming (on "I Surrender")
- Jeff Gitelman - guitar (except on "Green Fields"), vocals (on "Joey Rogers"), additional vocals (on "Too Much MIDI (Please Forgive Me)"), additional vocals and lyrics (on "Break Inside")
- Autre Ne Veut - vocals and additional lyrics (on "I Surrender"), additional vocals and lyrics (on "Break Inside")
- Aaron David Cross - additional synthesizers (on "Break inside")
- Paul Hammer - drums (on "The Voices")
- Andrew Brady - guitar (on "Green Fields")
- Himanshu Suri - vocals on "Scumsoft"
- Julia Krivonos - System II voice (on "Channel Pressure")
- Al Carlson - engineering, vocal programming
- Joe LaPorta - mixing
- Guillermo Scott Herren - mixing
- Thunderhorse - cover art
- B. Sisto - layout and typography
