= Chance of Rain =

Chance of Rain may refer to:

- Probability of precipitation
- Chance of Rain (Laurel Halo album), 2013
- Chance of Rain (Stefanie Heinzmann album), 2015
