= Lifetime =

Lifetime may refer to:

- The period between one's birth and death
- Life expectancy, the length of time a person is expected to remain alive

== Arts, entertainment, and media ==
=== Music ===
- Lifetime (band), a band from New Jersey
- Life Time (Rollins Band album), by Rollins Band
- Life Time (Tony Williams album), by American jazz drummer Tony Williams
- Lifetime (Lifetime album), a 2007 album by the band Lifetime
- Lifetime (Real Life album), 1990
- Lifetime (Klein album), 2019
- Lifetime (Erika de Casier album), 2025
- LifeTimes, a 1979 album by Diana Hubbard
- "Lifetime" (Ben&Ben song)
- "Lifetime" (Katharine McPhee song), a 2010 song from Unbroken
- "Lifetime" (Noah and the Whale song)
- "Lifetime" (Maxwell song), a 2002 song by American R&B singer Maxwell
- "Lifetime" (Swedish House Mafia song)
- "Lifetime" (Three Days Grace song)
- "Lifetime" (Tobiahs song)
- "Lifetime" (Usher song)
- "Lifetimes" (song), a 2024 song by Katy Perry from 143
- "Lifetime", a 2009 song by Kris Allen from Kris Allen
- "Lifetime", a 2021 song by Justin Bieber from Justice
- "Lifetime", a 2026 song by Iceage from For Love of Grace & the Hereafter
- "Lifetimes", a 2001 track by Slam
- "Lifetimes", a 2005 song by Sheryl Crow from Wildflower

=== Television ===
- "Life Time" (M*A*S*H), a 1979 episode of the TV series M*A*S*H
- Lifetime (Southeast Asian TV channel), an Asian television channel owned by A+E Networks Asia
- Lifetime (TV channel), a cable television programming network geared towards women
  - Lifetime (Canadian TV channel), the Canadian version of the American TV channel of the same name
- Lifetime (British and Irish TV channel), a defunct British entertainment television channel
- Lifetime Entertainment Services (LES), an American entertainment industry company
- LMN, formerly Lifetime Movie Network and Lifetime Movies, an American digital cable and satellite television network

=== Other uses in arts, entertainment, and media ===
- Lifetimes, an alternative English-language title for a 1994 Chinese film, also known as To Live
- Lifetimes: True Accounts of Reincarnation (1979), a book by Frederick Lenz

== Duration or time span ==
- Mean lifetime, a certain number that characterizes the rate of reduction ("decay") of an assembly of unstable particles
- Object lifetime, in object-oriented programming, the time between an object's creation until the object is no longer used
- Product lifetime, a product's expected lifetime
- Service life, a product's expected time in use between point of sale and point of discard

== Enterprises and organizations ==
- Life Time, Inc. (formerly Life Time Fitness), a chain of health clubs in the US and Canada
- Lifetimes, a museum in Croydon, England (1995–2004), now known as the Museum of Croydon
- Lifetime Products, a manufacturer of tables, chairs, outdoor sheds, utility trailers, and residential basketball equipment

== See also ==
- "A Lifetime", a 2001 song by Better Than Ezra
- Life span (disambiguation)
