= Lifespan =

Lifespan or life span may refer to:

- Lifespan (film), 1976 film starring Klaus Kinski
- Lifespan (video game), 1983 Atari 8-bit computer game
- Lifespan (album), 2004 album by Kris Davis
- Lifespan: Why We Age – and Why We Don't Have To, 2019 book by David Andrew Sinclair
- Lifespan.io, non-profit crowdfunding platform of the Lifespan Extension Advocacy Foundation
- Lifespan (health system), now Brown University Health, a not-for-profit academic health system in Providence, Rhode Island

== See also ==
- Maximum life span, the maximum lifespan observed in a group
- Life expectancy, the average lifespan expected of a group
- Longevity, the average lifespan expected under ideal conditions
- Lifetime (disambiguation)
