= Behind the Green Door (EP) =

EP by Laurel Halo
- Released: May 20, 2013
- Genre: Techno
- Length: 25:51
- Label: Hyperdub
- Producer: Laurel Halo

Laurel Halo chronology
Quarantine (2012)	Behind the Green Door (2013)	Chance of Rain (2013)

Behind the Green Door is an extended play (EP) by American musician Laurel Halo, released on May 20, 2013, through Hyperdub. The EP was influenced by the techno music of Detroit and the United Kingdom. The track "Throw" was recorded in London using a detuned piano. It peaked at number 22 on the UK Physical Singles Chart.

== Critical reception ==
Professional ratings
Aggregate scores
Source	Rating
Metacritic	74/100
Review scores
Source	Rating
Consequence of Sound	C+
Drowned in Sound	8/10
Exclaim!	6/10
Fact	4/5 stars
Pitchfork	7.2/10
Resident Advisor	4/5

Behind the Green Door received generally favorable reviews from music critics, with a Metacritic weighed aggregate score of 74 out of 100 based on eight reviews. Drowned in Sound critic George Bass wrote, "It's as direct and aggressive as any of Halo's floor-orientated material, and shows that, while she may turn more heads with more compositional, vocal-driven tracks, Hyperdub and Halo can move into new areas, one where syncopated drum lines break for vintage warehouse rhythms and the chill-out room has been invaded by pianists and a house DJ."

Paula Mejia of Consequence of Sound wrote, "Like Halo’s previous work, Behind The Green Door coos the listener to listen often and closely, while instilling that sense of intrigue that unexplained mysteries leave you with." Writing for Exclaim!, Ian Schober stated that the EP "contains some of the most comfortably weird grooves we've heard from Laurel Halo." Pitchfork's Nick Neyland said the EP "feels more in tune with decay and exploitation in sexual portrayal, the numbness accrued from a constant barrage of imagery, than anything that's notionally 'sexy.'"

XLR8R named it the 15th best release of 2013.

== Track listing ==
All tracks are written by Laurel Halo.

No.	Title	Length
1.	"Throw"	5:25
2.	"UHF F/O"	5:39
3.	"NOYFB"	7:09
4.	"Sex Mission"	7:38
Total length:		25:51

== Charts ==
Chart (2013)	Peak position
UK Physical Singles (OCC)	22
