= Jessica Ekomane =

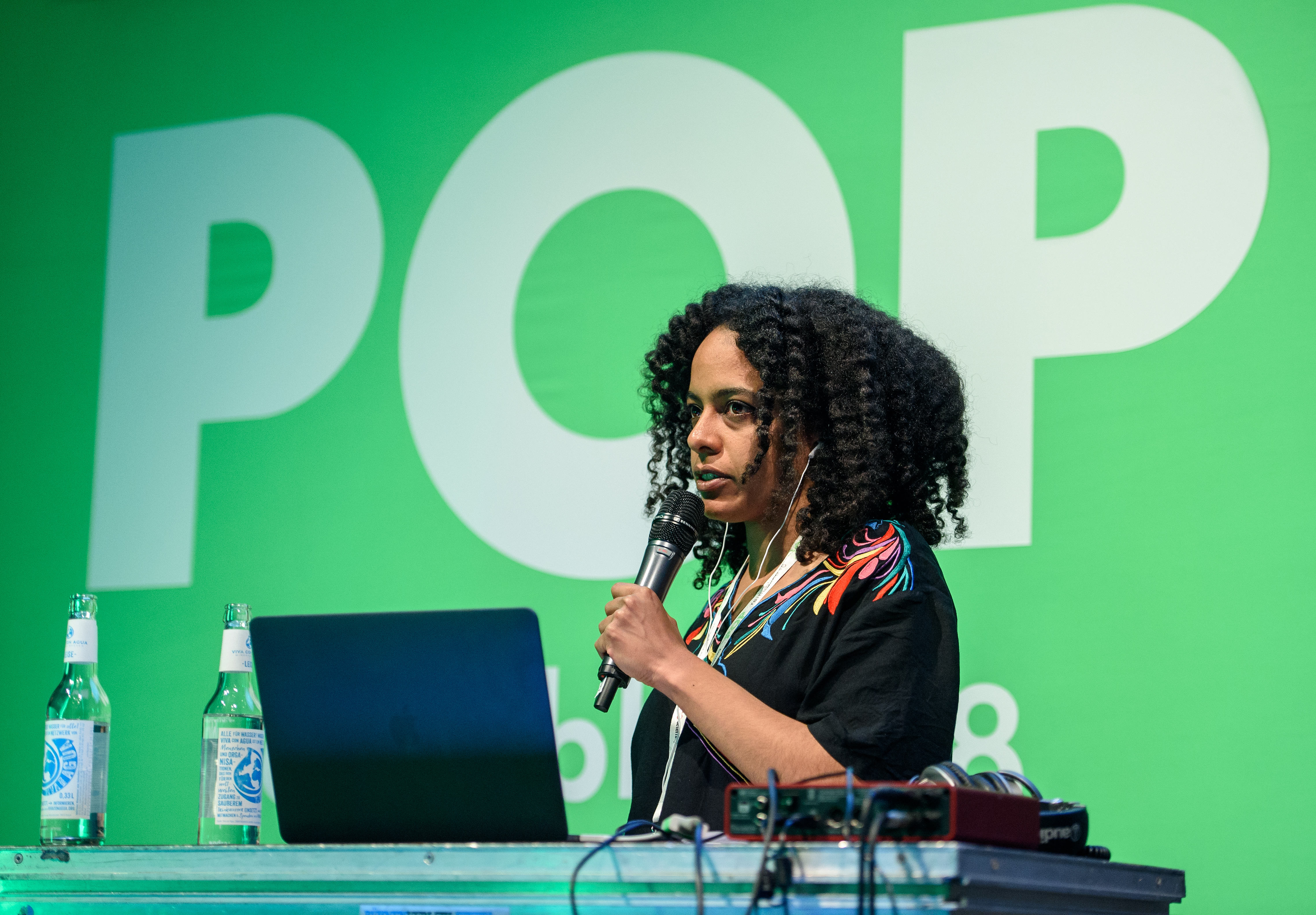
- Ekomane in 2018

Background information
- Born: France
- Genres: Electronic; experimental; computer music
- Occupations: Composer; Musician
- Years active: 2018–present
- Labels: Important Records; Shelter Press
- Website: jessicaekomane.com

Jessica Ekomane is an electronic musician and composer. Born in France, she lives and works in Berlin. Her work often utilizes computer music techniques, sound synthesis and algorithmic composition.

Her debut album Multivocal was released in 2019 on Important Records.

In 2024, she released Manifolds, a piece commissioned by the Groupe de Recherches Musicales (GRM) for its loudspeaker orchestra, the Acousmonium. It was released as a split with Laurel Halo's Octavia. The release appears on the Portraits GRM record series, a joint series between the GRM and its label partner Shelter Press, a collaboration originally started with Peter Rehberg of Editions MEGO.

She was awarded with a Villa Romana Prize, as well as a ZKM Giga-Hertz production award in 2023 (alongside Lea Bertucci and Laurie Spiegel).

She was one of the composers chosen as collaborators by Natascha Sadr Haghigian for her installation Ankerzentrum at the German pavilion of the Venice Biennale 2019.

== Discography ==
=== Solo ===
Manifolds – split album with Laurel Halo's "Octavia" (2024, Shelter Press / Portraits GRM)

Multivocal (2019, Important Records)

=== Compilations ===
"MR.2023.9.5-A3" – Temporary Stored II (2024, OFNOT). With KMRU, Aho Ssan, Lamin Fofana, Nyokabi Kariũki.

"First Light" – XKatedral Anthology II, An Anthology of Slowly Evolving Timbral Music (2023, XKatedral). With Kali Malone, Mats Erlandsson, Theodor Kentros, Wilma Hultén, and Maria W. Horn.

"Iteration" – with Zoë McPherson, Ostgut Ton Fünfzehn +1 (2021, Ostgut Ton)

=== Other ===
"Latitudes" – Sonneurs 2 (2022, Buda Musique). With Erwan Keravec and Sonneurs.
