= Tracer (album) =

Studio album by Teengirl Fantasy
- Released: August 21, 2012
- Genre: Electronic
- Length: 39:40
- Label: R&S Records; True Panther Sounds
- Producer: Logan Takahashi; Nick Weiss

Teengirl Fantasy chronology
7AM (2010)	Tracer (2012)	8AM (2017)

Tracer is the second studio album by American electronic music duo Teengirl Fantasy. It was released on R&S Records and True Panther Sounds on August 21, 2012. It features vocal contributions from Kelela, Panda Bear, Laurel Halo, and Romanthony.

== Critical reception ==
Professional ratings
Aggregate scores
Source	Rating
Metacritic	71/100
Review scores
Source	Rating
AllMusic	4/5 stars
Clash	8/10
Consequence of Sound	B
Fact	3/5
NME	7/10
Pitchfork	7.0/10
PopMatters	6/10 stars
Resident Advisor	2.5/5
Slant Magazine	4/5 stars
Spin	7/10

At Metacritic, which assigns a weighted average score out of 100 to reviews from mainstream critics, Tracer received an average score of 71, based on 25 reviews, indicating "generally favorable reviews".

Sarah H. Grant of Consequence of Sound gave the album a grade of "B" and commented that "Teengirl Fantasy's interpretation of dance-pop through a technical EDM filter recalls Sonic Youth's re-interpretation of hardcore punk through indie rock." Jayson Greene of Pitchfork gave the album a 7.0 out of 10, saying, "If Tracer has significant replay value, it's for the parsing of the details of its light-filled surface, for the sounds themselves." George Bass of Slant Magazine gave the album 4 out of 5 stars, describing it as "a carefully balanced collage of experimental electronica and stylish vocal pop on which Nick Weiss and Logan Takahashi display a technical prowess to match many of EDM's current stars".

Blurt named it the 27th best album of 2012.

== Track listing ==
All tracks are written by Logan Takahashi and Nick Weiss, except where noted.

No.	Title	Writer(s)	Length
1.	"Orbit"		3:14
2.	"EFX" (featuring Kelela)	Takahashi; Weiss; Kelela Mizanekristos	3:40
3.	"Eternal"		4:27
4.	"Pyjama" (featuring Panda Bear)	Takahashi; Weiss; Noah Lennox	3:34
5.	"Mist of Time" (featuring Laurel Halo)	Takahashi; Weiss; Laurel Halo	3:06
6.	"End"		4:08
7.	"Vector Spray"		4:04
8.	"Inca"		3:37
9.	"Do It" (featuring Romanthony)	Takahashi; Weiss; Romanthony	4:37
10.	"Timeline"		5:20
Total length:			39:40

== Personnel ==
Credits adapted from liner notes.

- Logan Takahashi – performance, production
- Nick Weiss – performance, production
- Kelela – vocals (2)
- Panda Bear – vocals (4)
- Laurel Halo – vocals (5)
- Romanthony – vocals (9)
- Nathan Boddy – additional mixing (1, 3, 5–8, 10)
- Michael Cheever – additional mixing (2, 4, 9)
- Joe LaPorta – mastering
- Kari Attmann – artwork
- Richard Robinson – design
