= Dust (Laurel Halo album) =

Studio album by Laurel Halo
- Released: June 23, 2017
- Studio: Experimental Media and Performing Arts Center (Troy, New York)
- Genres: Art pop; experimental; electronic; musique concrète
- Length: 43:44
- Label: Hyperdub
- Producer: Laurel Halo

Laurel Halo chronology
Chance of Rain (2013)	Dust (2017)	Raw Silk Uncut Wood (2018)

Singles from Dust
- 1. "Jelly" Released: April 20, 2017

Dust is the third album by American electronic music artist Laurel Halo, released on June 23, 2017 by Hyperdub. The album features contributions from Eli Keszler, Julia Holter, Michael Salu, and Max D among others. The album was preceded by the single "Jelly", featuring Klein and Lafawndah.

== Background and release ==
The composing process for Dust began in early 2015 at a two-week residency at the Experimental Media and Performing Arts Center in upstate New York, where Halo worked between a "black box space" and a concert hall equipped with percussion, piano, and a digital mixer. The artist invited French singer Lafawndah and American percussionist Eli Keszler during her residency. Dubois described the environment as "a very Lynchian scene," with Halo "directing [her] like an actress; she had lyrics she wanted [her] to sing" and "ways she needed things to be said."

Halo described the lyrical process as lacking "very specific or linear narratives," inspired by Aram Saroyan, Anne Carson's translations of Sappho, and concrete poetry, most notably using the adaptation of "Servidão de Passagem" by Haroldo de Campos on the opening track "Sun to Solar." She used a method of "randomizing the lines" of her lyrics to create a disjointed structure, leaping from "heavily emotional" writing to "something that is completely about the weather or something super basic."

On April 20, 2017, Halo announced the album and released the single "Jelly", a "swirling vortex of soulful sounds and harsh judgement," featuring vocal contributions by Klein and Lafawndah. The single was accompanied by a music video created by Bureau Borsche, who were also in charge of the album's graphic design.

== Critical reception ==
Professional ratings
Aggregate scores
Source	Rating
AnyDecentMusic?	8.3/10
Metacritic	84/100
Review scores
Source	Rating
AllMusic	3.5/5 stars
Exclaim!	9/10
Financial Times	4/5 stars
The Guardian	5/5 stars
The Irish Times	4/5 stars
Mixmag	9/10
The Observer	4/5 stars
Pitchfork	8.2/10
Resident Advisor	4.3/5
Uncut	8/10

Upon its release, Dust was received positively by music critics, with a Metacritic weighed aggregate score of 84 out of 100 based on 18 reviews, indicating "universal acclaim". Writing for The Guardian, Ben Beaumont-Thomas called the album "a triumph of impressionism, where the digital and organic coexist in a radically beautiful whole," while naming it electronic." In his review for AllMusic, Paul Simpson described Dust as, "very disorienting and not always easy to grasp hold of, but it never comes close to sounding like anything else, and its best moments are highly compelling." Heather Phares described the album in the artist's biography as fusing jazz with avant-pop. Resident Advisor described the music on Dust as experimental. Andrew Dorsett of PopMatters said in his review that Halo is "crafting a series of drifting art pop pieces that evoke forgotten, buried materials long since fallen into disrepair.". The Quietus' Joseph Burnett said that "her almost monomaniacal focus on the intricacies of sound since her earliest releases has clearly culminated with this record, one that is in constant flux between joyful abandon and grim introspection, pop-tinged electronica and avant-garde expressionism."

April Clare Welsh of Fact wrote: "Like Arca's Arca, Laurel Halo's third album also explores the human voice. But while Arca explores largely organic territory, Halo fashions a musique concrete mosaic of vocal cut-ups and robotic reveries."

=== Accolades ===
Publication	Accolade	Rank	Ref.
Drowned in Sound	Favourite Albums of 2017	85	
Fact	The 50 Best Albums of 2017	6	
Gigwise	Gigwise's 51 Best Albums of 2017	18	
Gorilla vs. Bear	Gorilla vs. Bear's Albums of 2017	5	
Pitchfork	The 50 Best Albums of 2017	46	
Tiny Mix Tapes	2017: Favorite 50 Music Releases	7	
The Vinyl Factory	The 50 Best Albums of 2017	8	

== Track listing ==
Tracks listing adapted from Bandcamp.

All tracks are written by Laurel Halo.

No.	Title	Length
1.	"Sun to Solar"	5:33
2.	"Jelly"	4:55
3.	"Koinos"	2:50
4.	"Arschkriecher"	1:35
5.	"Moontalk"	4:24
6.	"Nicht ohne Risiko"	1:41
7.	"Who Won"	3:44
8.	"Like an L"	3:58
9.	"Syzygy"	6:30
10.	"Do U Ever Happen"	5:14
11.	"Buh-Bye"	3:14

Japanese edition
No.	Title	Length
12.	"[untitled]"	2:09
13.	"Who Won?" (Acapella)	3:23

== Personnel ==
Credits adapted from the liner notes of Dust.

=== Musicians ===
- Laurel Halo – vocals, synthesizer, piano, vibraphone, guitaret
- Eli Keszler – drum kit, dumbek, glockenspiel
- Max D – cowbell (track 2)
- Klein – vocals (tracks 1, 2)
- Lafawndah – vocals (tracks 2, 8)
- Michael Salu – vocals (tracks 7)
- Craig Clouse – wurlitzer (tracks 7, 9, 10)
- Julia Holter – cello (track 10)
- Michael Beharie – electric guitar (track 5)
- Diamond Terrifier – tenor saxophone (tracks 4, 10)

=== Technical personnel ===
- Laurel Halo – production
- Cole M.G.N. – mixing
- Jason Goz – mastering

=== Artwork ===
- Phillip Aumann – photography
