= Atlas (Laurel Halo album) =

Studio album by Laurel Halo
- Released: September 22, 2023
- Recorded: 2020–2022
- Genre: Ambient; minimalist
- Length: 40:46
- Label: Awe
- Producer: Laurel Halo

Laurel Halo chronology
Raw Silk Uncut Wood (2018)	Atlas (2023)

Singles from Atlas
- 1. "Belleville" Released: July 12, 2023; 2. "Atlas" Released: August 8, 2023

Atlas is the fourth full-length album by American electronic musician Laurel Halo. It was released on September 22, 2023, through her own label Awe. The album features contributions by saxophonist Bendik Giske, violinist James Underwood, cellist Lucy Railton, and vocalist Coby Sey.

== Background and release ==
Atlas began to assume shape in 2020. A year later, Halo was invited to the Ina-GRM Studios in Paris. She would spend 2021 studying and experimenting with simple piano sketches that she had recorded over the months prior. She added "electronic flourishes and acoustic instrumentation" in 2021 and 2022, with time spent between Berlin and London, which would later result in the project Atlas. The album comes after years of "researching electroacoustic sound design" and a newfound passion for piano. It includes a combination of ambient and jazz sounds.

Halo announced the album on July 12, 2023, and released the lead single "Belleville", "a welcome return" after five years absence from releasing, the same day. Halo is joined by singer Coby Sey on the track. The album marks her first record under her own imprint Awe, the namesake of the associated NTS radio show. She presented the title track "Atlas" on August 8, an "ambient track filled with dramatic flourishes" accompanied by strings and an "abstract sense of dread".

== Critical reception ==
Professional ratings
Aggregate scores
Source	Rating
Metacritic	80/100
Review scores
Source	Rating
Clash	9/10
Pitchfork	8.1/10
Uncut	7/10

Atlas received a score of 80 out of 100 on review aggregator Metacritic based on seven critics' reviews, indicating "generally favorable" reception. Pitchfork rated the album 8.1/10, describing it as "among her best, a beautiful collection of minimalist ambient compositions in which no line extends for long without dissolving into an inky blot". Uncut stated that Atlas is "occasionally guilty of tasteful conservatory restraint, but overall this is a richly, immersive headphones experience, a haunted sonic mansion of many chambers". Jack Oxford of Clash called it "tamed chaos, a three-year exploration of sound and nostalgia. Each track is a dense collage, merging into a greater collage in the album's context, with piano and strings evoking familiarity alongside thick soundscapes".

=== Accolades ===
Publication	Accolade	Rank	Ref.
Clash	Albums of the Year 2023	15	
Exclaim!	Exclaim!'s 50 Best Albums of 2023	33	
The Fader	The 50 Best Albums of 2023	41	
Pitchfork	The 50 Best Albums of 2023	26	

== Track listing ==
All tracks are written by Laurel Halo.

Atlas track listing
No.	Title	Length
1.	"Abandon"	4:01
2.	"Naked to the Light"	4:19
3.	"Late Night Drive"	4:55
4.	"Sick Eros"	4:22
5.	"Belleville"	2:25
6.	"Sweat, Tears or the Sea"	2:45
7.	"Atlas"	6:53
8.	"Reading the Air"	5:42
9.	"You Burn Me"	1:08
10.	"Earthbound"	4:16
Total length:		40:46

== Personnel ==
- Laurel Halo – vocals, production, electronics, guitar, piano, vibraphone, violin
- Lucy Railton – cello
- Bendik Giske – saxophone
- James Underwood – violin
- Coby Sey – vocals
- Rashad Becker – mastering
- James Ginzburg – mixing
- Hugo Blanzat – design
- Martine Syms – photography

== Charts ==
Chart performance for Atlas
Chart (2023)	Peak position
UK Album Downloads (OCC)	70
