= Autre Ne Veut =

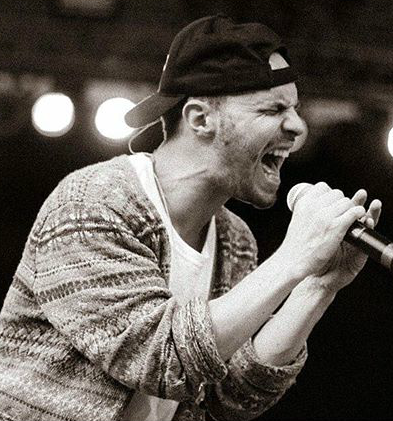
- Autre Ne Veut performing at SummerStage in 2013

Background information
- Born: Arthur Ashin; 1982 (age 43–44); Raleigh, NC
- Origin: New York City
- Genres: Alternative R&B
- Occupation: Singer-songwriter
- Years active: 2010–present
- Labels: Olde English Spelling Bee, Software Recording Co.

Arthur Ashin (born 20 April 1982), known professionally as Autre Ne Veut, is an American singer-songwriter and musician from New York City.

The name Autre Ne Veut is taken from an inscription in French on a 15th-century British dress ornament that is stored at The Cloisters and is translated to English as "I want no other."

== Early life and education ==
Ashin was born on 20 April 1982 in Raleigh, North Carolina. They earned their undergraduate degree at Hampshire College, where they lived with Daniel Lopatin (later of Oneohtrix Point Never). After college, Ashin lived briefly in New York City and Chicago before establishing their home in Brooklyn. They briefly enrolled in a master's program in clinical psychology but dropped out in order to focus on their music.

== Career ==
Ashin's debut album and the subsequent "Body EP" were recorded at home. Additionally, although it was never heard by the public before a one-time performance in 2016, Ashin recorded a “lost” album. Written during the winter of 2011-12 between “Body EP” and “Anxiety”, Ashin titled the album “kingofpop” in a characteristic self-deprecating reference to Michael Jackson.

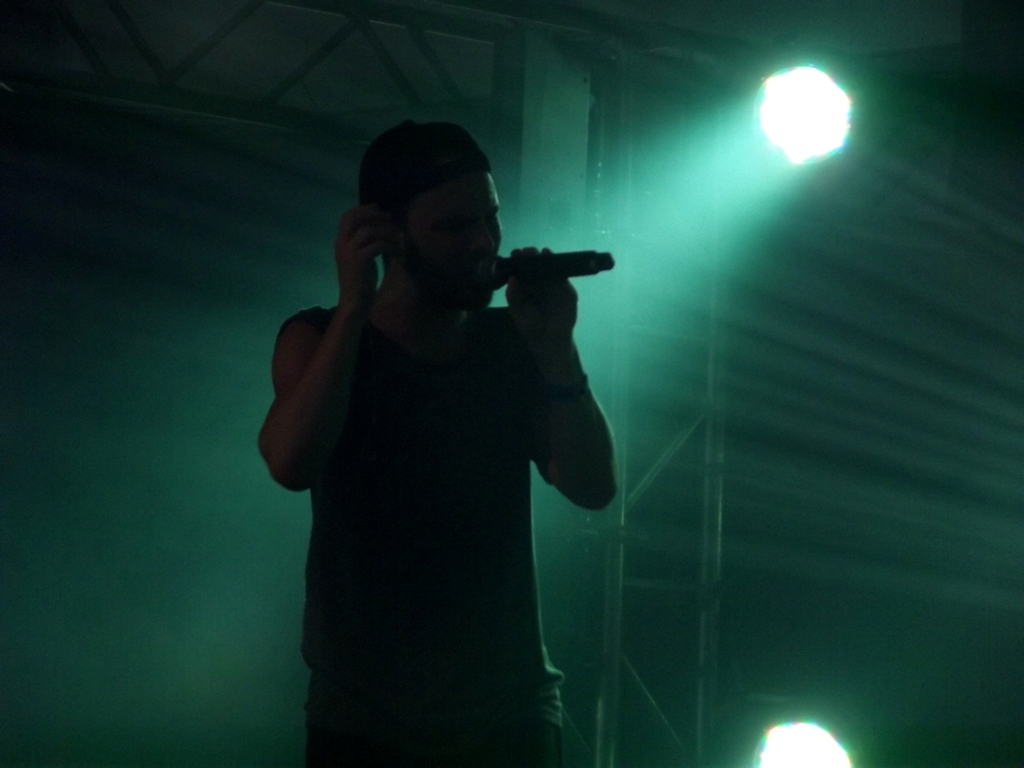
Autre Ne Veut in 2013

Ashin's 2013 album, Anxiety, was self-produced as well; however, Ford & Lopatin contributed to the recording in a studio. Anxiety received a 7.6 out of 10 on the meta-review site anydecentmusic.com. including Best New Music from Pitchfork. Gorilla vs. Bear named Anxiety as "Album of Year (so far)" in June 2013.

In July 2013, Ashin released a single titled "On & On" as part of the Adult Swim Summer Singles series. In 2015, Ashin released their third studio album, titled "Age of Transparency".

In October 2022, Ashin released their first new music in 7 years, a single titled "Okay", and in September 2024 announced their first new album in almost a decade, titled "Love, Guess Who??", scheduled to be released on 1 November 2024.

== Discography ==
=== Albums ===
- Autre Ne Veut (2010)
- kingofpop (2012)
- Anxiety (2013)
- Age of Transparency (2015)
- Love, Guess Who?? (2024)

=== Singles & EPs ===
- Body EP (2011)
- Don's Rainbow (2011)
- Okay (2022)
