= Tommy (EP) =

- Digital artwork

EP by Klein
- Released: 29 September 2017
- Recorded: Klein's room, South London; Abbey Road Studios, London
- Genres: Experimental; R&B; electronic; glitch
- Length: 24:42
- Label: Hyperdub
- Producer: Klein

Klein chronology
Lagata (2016)	Tommy (2017)	cc (2018)

Tommy is an extended play by South London musician Klein, released on 29 September 2017. It is her debut release on Kode9's electronic label Hyperdub. It received acclaim from professional critics. It was named the third best release of 2017 by The Wire.

== Background ==
Tommy is Klein's Hyperdub label debut after she self-released two projects in 2016. It was primarily recorded in Klein's room in South London with the exception of "Prologue", which was recorded at Abbey Road Studios. The album's digital cover was photographed by Hannah Diamond.

Klein described the titular name as "symbolism for a person who is really going through a lot of shit," inspired primarily by Love & Hip Hop cast member Tommie Lee. "Everlong" references the Foo Fighters' song of the same name. One inspiration for the project came from a dream in which R&B singer Brandy advised Klein to record with "less echoes."

== Composition ==
Tommy, typical of Klein's self-produced and uniquely developed style, was created with the audio editor Audacity as well as Ableton Live for songwriting and sequencing, incorporating sonic artifacts, looping, and melodies formed through pitchshifting that often use seventh chords. Multiple songs have structures that build up and crescendo into droning, often industrial-sounding noise formed out of overly distorted loops. As well as this, "Runs Reprise", "Everlong" and "B2k" gradually make use of cut up and sped up Amen breaks. On "B2k", named for the R&B group, Klein used synth pads which 'felt like [they] could be part of that era', but the song changed as she 'made it live and was a bit waved' on her sequencer; the song is resequenced out of what she recorded.

The other day I had to listen to the record and I was like 'OK, maybe it is a little bit intense'. It is probably darker than stuff I’ve put out before, but in a way it is softer and very honest too. 'Act One' is about friendship. At the time I was watching The Sound of Music loads and I love musicals and the drama and exaggeration of saying things you want to say to your friend but just stretched out. Playing around with that and the tonalities of how something is supposed to sound, and then placing it a certain way, I guess that is why certain things do sound dark. But even if I’m feeling sad or whatever, I’ll make stuff from my own head and for me it feels warm because I’ll add in certain, softer chords, obviously forgetting that the person listening is shook, like 'OK, this is too much'.

== Reception ==
Professional ratings
Aggregate scores
Source	Rating
Metacritic	83/100
Review scores
Source	Rating
Exclaim!	7/10
Pitchfork	7.6/10
The Quietus	(positive)
Resident Advisor	4.2/5
Tiny Mix Tapes	4.5/5 stars
The Wire	(positive)

Tommy received acclaim from critics, scoring 83 out of 100 on aggregate website Metacritic based on six professional reviews. Andrew Ryce of Resident Advisor wrote that "Klein's work exists entirely on its own terms," describing the EP as one of Hyperdub's "most dumbfounding records" but adding that "even at its weirdest, it's deeply affecting music." Ashley Hampson of Exclaim! wrote that "through fragmentation, each track finds cohesion, making deconstruction — the silences, gaps, twisted repetitions, abrupt cuts, looped production, harried noise — the story itself." Nick James Scavo of Tiny Mix Tapes called it "exhausting, refreshing, new" as well as "actually experimental in its affects, its tactics, its textures."

== Track list ==
All tracks produced by Klein.

No.	Title	Length
1.	"Prologue" (ft atl, Jacob Samuel, thisisDA, Pure Water, eric sings)	5:22
2.	"Act One" (w Embaci & Jacob Samuel)	2:55
3.	"Cry Theme"	3:44
4.	"Tommy"	1:48
5.	"Runs Reprise"	0:55
6.	"Everlong"	3:00
7.	"B2k"	3:27
8.	"Farewell Sorry"	3:31
Total length:		24:42

== Personnel ==
Credits adapted from Bandcamp.

- Klein - production, vocals
- Hannah Diamond - cover photo
