= Workaround (album) =

Studio album by Beatrice Dillon
- Released: 7 February 2020
- Genre: Electronic
- Length: 41:50
- Label: PAN

Beatrice Dillon chronology
Workaround (2020)	50 Locked Grooves (2021)

Workaround is the debut solo studio album by British electronic artist Beatrice Dillon. It was released on 7 February 2020 through the record label PAN. The review aggregator Metacritic described the album's reception as "universal acclaim".

== Background ==
Beatrice Dillon is a British record producer, DJ, and composer based in London. She studied fine art at Chelsea College of Arts. Workaround is her debut album. The album takes inspiration from the works of James P. Carse, Tomma Abts, Jorinde Voigt, and Bridget Riley. She created the album between 2017 and 2019, in London, Berlin, and New York, with multiple musicians. The album's cover features artwork by Thomas Ruff. The album was released on 7 February 2020 through PAN.

== Critical reception ==
Professional ratings
Aggregate scores
Source	Rating
Metacritic	87/100
Review scores
Source	Rating
AllMusic	4/5 stars
Crack	8/10
The Guardian	5/5 stars
The Line of Best Fit	8/10
Loud and Quiet	7/10
Pitchfork	8.3/10

According to the review aggregator Metacritic, Workaround received "universal acclaim" based on a weighted average score of 87 out of 100 from 8 critic scores.

Evan Lilly of The Line of Best Fit stated, "Embracing chic elements of avant-garde and body-moving techno, her debut remains clear-cut, her songs fashioned around sharp, enunciated thuds." Katie Thomas of Crack wrote, "Dillon's DJ sets are valued for her playful affinity for rhythm and groove – Workaround is a thrilling extension of that dancefloor fascination."

=== Accolades ===
Accolades for Workaround
Publication	Accolade	Rank	Ref.
AllMusic	AllMusic Best of 2020	—	
Crack	The Top 50 Albums of 2020	16	
Esquire	The 50 Best Albums of 2020	14	
The Guardian	The 50 Best Albums of 2020	22	
Pitchfork	The 50 Best Albums of 2020	33	
PopMatters	The 60 Best Albums of 2020	22	
The Quietus	Quietus Albums of the Year 2020	23	
The Wire	Releases of the Year (2020 Rewind)	1	

== Track listing ==
Workaround track listing
No.	Title	Length
1.	"Workaround One"	3:37
2.	"Workaround Two"	4:21
3.	"Workaround Three"	4:24
4.	"Workaround Four"	5:50
5.	"Workaround Five"	1:36
6.	"Clouds Strum"	4:45
7.	"Workaround Six"	1:28
8.	"Workaround Seven"	3:18
9.	"Workaround Eight"	4:26
10.	"Workaround Nine"	1:23
11.	"Square Fifths"	4:31
12.	"Workaround Bass"	0:41
13.	"Pause"	0:12
14.	"Workaround Ten"	1:18
Total length:		41:50

== Personnel ==
Credits adapted from liner notes.

- Beatrice Dillon – electronics, drum programming, synthesizer, percussion, tidal, bass
- Kuljit Bhamra – tabla, dholak, darabukka (1, 4, 6, 11)
- Laurel Halo – vocals, additional synthesizer (2)
- Verity Susman – alto saxophone, soprano saxophone (2)
- Jonny Lam – pedal steel guitar (2)
- Lucy Railton – cello (3, 5)
- Kenichi Iwasa – wave drum, clave (3, 11)
- Batu – hi-hat (6)
- Morgan Buckley – bodhrán (6)
- Petter Eldh – double bass (7, 8)
- Untold – electric guitar (7, 8)
- Kadialy Kouyaté – kora (8)
- James Rand – additional editing, mixing
- Rashad Becker – mastering
- Thomas Ruff – artwork
- Johannes Schnatmann – layout
- Bill Kouligas – layout
