= That We Can Play =

EP by Games
- Released: November 2, 2010
- Recorded: 2010
- Length: 18:23
- Label: Hippos in Tanks
- Producers: Daniel Lopatin, Joel Ford

Games chronology
That We Can Play (2010)	Channel Pressure (2011)

That We Can Play is the debut EP of the American electronic-music project Games, consisting of producers Daniel Lopatin and Joel Ford. Lopatin and Ford (who had made electronic music together since their school days) produced That We Can Play in an apartment studio, using vintage synthesizers and sequencers to recapture the sound and style of 1980s power pop.

That We Can Play contains six songs, including four original Games tracks (one, the opener "Strawberry Skies", with vocals by Laurel Halo). It also has two remixes: a remix of "Strawberry Skies" by the Chicago duo Gatekeeper and a reprise of a song by Canadian musician CFCF. The EP, released in November 2010 on the Hippos in Tanks label, was promoted with music videos and singles. It was well received by critics, who appreciated the duo's use of its 1980s power-pop influences, and made the top ten of MP3 blog Gorilla vs. Bear's year-end list.

== Background ==
Ford and Lopatin, who met in a science class, began playing music together in high school. During their practice sessions they experimented with electronic music using a Roland Juno-60 (belonging to Lopatin's father) and their high school's Ensoniq SQ-2, which Ford used as a drum machine. During these sessions, the two became serious about composing electronic music together. For a time they had separate careers, with Ford moving to New York City to play in soft-rock group Tigercity and Lopatin remaining in Boston to produce and compose music as Oneohtrix Point Never. In the summer of 2009, they developed an idea for a group they called Games after what Lopatin described as "an intense 72-hour internet writing frenzy". Lopatin and Ford spent a week recording demos at Ford's home in Massachusetts, developing their sound with "a ridiculously sick collection of vintage synths" they collected during their years as musicians. Other musical commitments slowed the work, but by 2010 they had moved into an apartment (lacking heat and hot water) to focus on the project.

== Production and composition ==
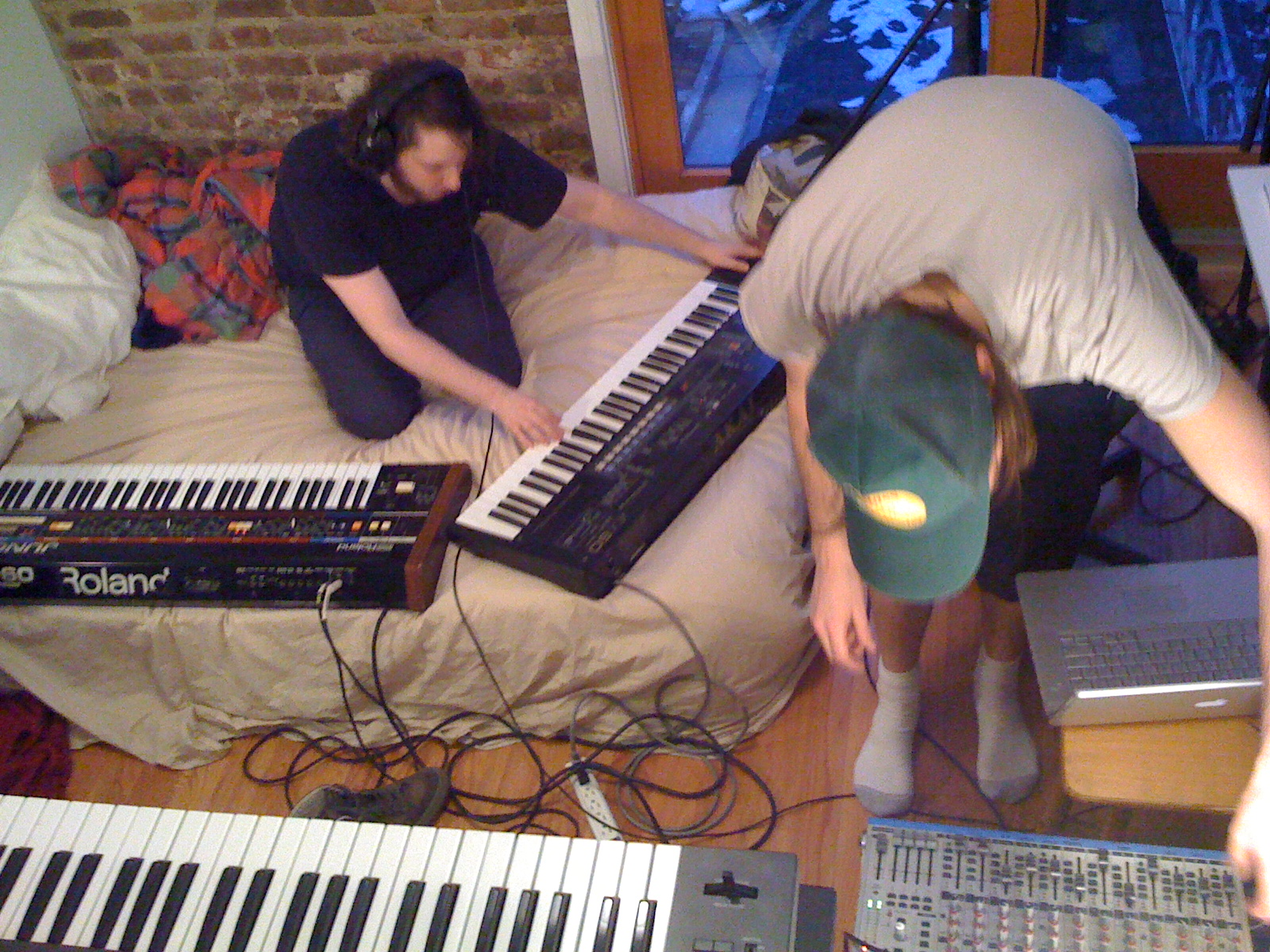
Games in their apartment, using vintage synths to record in March 2010

That We Can Play was recorded with a single stereo Pro Tools track and "outboard, secondhand vintage synths and sequencers". Ford explained the process of making each song in an interview with XLR8R: "It's almost like we just sit down with gear and are like, 'Whoa, this sounds sweet,' and then we'll make a beat, and be like, 'What if we do this?' and something comes out and we move from there. Where it gets really complex—and you can't be a slacker—is you have to inventorize all these tiny sounds and constantly be trying to fit all of these moving parts together and see what sticks—and it's a lot of repetitive, careful-listening kind of work."

The writing, recording and mixing of That We Can Play is rooted in 1980s power pop. On a technical level, according to Steve Shaw of Fact magazine, Games' instrumentation includes everything expected in 1980's music and is executed correctly: bass lines, strings, keytar and arpeggiators. Instead of merely reproducing the sound from that era, the band pushes the music into unfamiliar territory. According to Pitchfork Media's Joe Colly, the EP has a nostalgic sound – due, in part, to the analog synths ("not just vintage but almost aged" instrumentation) and their "glitchy electro jams."

== Songs ==
That We Can Play's opening track, "Strawberry Skies", the only cut on the release that was produced in a real studio, was inspired by the theme of the American television show Law & Order. Critics compared it to Bananarama's "Cruel Summer". The track features dream-like vocals by Laurel Halo, mixed with reverb; according to Fact, it reflects the "cloud-like" sounds of previous releases by Oneohtrix Point Never. In writing the lyrics to the song, Ford and Lopatin came up with several senseless phrases in writing the melody for the lead vocal, the former saying that he "made them about Shaq and Kobe and eating steak sandwiches and pies," and the latter saying "Anything just to get the sounds." "Strawberry Skies" is followed by "MIDI Drift", which features an Italo bass line, "pitch-bent keytar" and "square wave synths", and was compared by Michael Brodeur of The Boston Globe to the music of Ratatat.

The third track, "Planet Party", called "Apple IIe funk" by Joe Colly of Pitchfork Media, contains "wailing guitar synths", "fist-pumping bass", "scattergun freestyle drums" and "sudden, surprisingly violent orchestral stabs". Produced in the summer of 2010 and the first song to be chosen for inclusion on That We Can Play, Ford recalled, "We were making this smooth-rock, Alan Parsons Project-style shit, and then it completely got sliced and diced, mistakes happened in Pro Tools, and it became something else." "Shadows in Bloom", a reprise of Secret Service's "Flash in the Night", is a melancholy, mid-tempo power ballad featuring bass, snare and synth harmonies described by a reviewer as violent, cavernous, and harsh.

That We Can Play also includes two remixes; Chicago duo Gatekeeper's version of "Strawberry Skies" contains a sample of the PlayStation start-up sound and, according to Fact's Steve Shaw, "ups the '80s ante and slows the pace with their trademark industrial sex club character (sampling Boards of Canada in the process), the result sounding far more like a real computer game than any of the UK club tracks currently referencing them". The other remix is Games' version of CFCF's "It Was Never Meant to Be", which Shaw described it as a "lush affair" with "chopped DX7 pads and afro-new age staccato melodies".

== Promotion ==
The first song released from That We Can Play was "MIDI Drift", which was posted on Games' blog in April 2010. "Shadows in Bloom" premiered on the MP3 blog Gorilla vs. Bear and Pitchfork Media's Altered Zones website on September 29, 2010. On December 14, a remix of "Strawberry Skies" by electronic musician Hudson Mohawke (not included on the EP) became available for download on Fact's website; according to the magazine, it "manages to be totally malevolent while also sounding like an amazing street party, which is quite an achievement". A Stereogum writer called the Hudson Mohawke remix "nice", but preferred Gatekeeper's "strangulation" of the song.

That We Can Play was also promoted with several music videos. A video for "Planet Party" was released on Delicious Scopitone in August 2010, which Larry Fitzmaurice of Pitchfork Media described as "a stutteringly smooth, been-around-for-a-few-minutes" production with "jet skis, killer whales, water slides, wind surfing, track racing, and tape-warped women". A video for "Shadows in Bloom" by WEIRDCORE was released on November 11 and, according to Fitzmaurice, "showcases a warped take on airline attendants and air travel that has to be seen to be believed." On December 13 a video for "Strawberry Skies", directed by Josef Kraska and described by Gorilla vs. Bear as an "'80s chat line-shower montage", premiered on the blog.

== Packaging ==
The album cover features 49 flags below the title.

A fictional flag attributed to the Republic of Benin	Viet Cong	United States Civil Administration of the Ryukyu Islands	Free City of Danzig	Ottoman Empire	United Kingdom of Portugal, Brazil, and the Algarves	Western Sahara
United Arab Republic	Republic of Tuva	South African Republic	United Suvadive Republic	Northern Cyprus	Serbian Krajina	A fictional flag attributed to the Republic of Ezo
Republic of China	Alsace-Lorraine	Principality of Trinidad	Mongolian People's Republic	Orange Free State	Federal Republic of Yugoslavia	Kingdom of the Two Sicilies
Kingdom of Sarawak	British West Africa	State of Muskogee	Chinese Red Army	South Yemen	South Vietnam	South Ossetia
South Kasai	Somaliland	Kingdom of Sikkim	Riograndense Republic	Natalia Republic	Republic of Artsakh	Kingdom of Kurdistan
Kuban People's Republic	Kosovo	Republic of Formosa	East Germany	Czechoslovakia	Independent State of Croatia	Republic of Cospaia
Corsica	Biafra	State of Anjouan	Abkhazia	British Raj	Republic of Acre	Bisected flag

== Release and reception ==
In August 2010, Games stated that That We Can Play would be released in late September or early October 2010. However, when the release date and track list were announced on September 9 the release date had been pushed back to November 2. The EP, distributed by Hippos in Tanks with cover artwork by Christian "Megazord" Oldham and cover design by Rasmus Emanuel Svensson, was positively received by critics. In a November 3, 2010 review Steve Shaw praised That We Can Play for its accurate references to 1980s music, writing that the EP "resides in a both unsettled and an unsettling state, with hints of something very strong and unique perhaps being tied down by exploring more recognisable formats". Shaw recommended it to his readers, giving it a rating of four out of five. In a Boston Globe review Michael Brodeur described the EP as "unrelentingly retro, but intriguingly interstitial", with a smoothness which "sounds like a familiar future". Joe Colly of Pitchfork Media called That We Can Play "a quirky and technical treat" but criticized the EP's brevity, lamenting the omission of previous Games singles "Everything Is Working" and "Heartlands". That We Can Play was ranked eighth on Gorilla vs. Bear's list of the top 30 albums of 2010; according to Chris Cantalini, "The run time here is slight, but the EP's brevity works in its favor, as there's not a wasted second on this thing."

== Track listing ==
All tracks are written by Daniel Lopatin and Joel Ford

No.	Title	Length
1.	"Strawberry Skies" (featuring Laurel Halo)	3:14
2.	"MIDI Drift"	3:12
3.	"Planet Party"	2:46
4.	"Shadows in Bloom"	2:33
5.	"It Was Never Meant to Be" (Games remix of a song originally by CFCF)	3:19
6.	"Strawberry Skies" (Gatekeeper remix)	3:19
Total length:		18:23

Sample credits

- "Shadows In Bloom" samples "Flash In The Night" by Secret Service.

== Credits and personnel ==
Credits and personnel from liner notes:

Personnel

- Production, songwriting, performers – Daniel Lopatin and Joel Ford
- Mastering, additional mixing on "Strawberry Skies" – Al Carlson
- Additional vocals on "Strawberry Skies" – Laurel Halo
- Artwork – Christian "Megazord" Oldham
- Artwork design – Rasmus Emanuel Svensson

Equipment

- Akai AX60
- Akai AX80
- Akai MPC1000
- Kawai R100
- Korg Wavestation
- Roland D-550
- Roland Juno-106
- Roland Juno-60
- Roland Alpha Juno 2
- Sequential Circuits Prophet 600
- Yamaha Motif
