= Teengirl Fantasy =

American electronic music duo

- Origin: United States
- Genre: Electronic
- Years active: 2008–present
- Labels: True Panther Sounds; Planet Mu; R&S; Merok Records; Break World Records
- Members: Logan Takahashi; Nick Weiss
- Website: teengirlfantasy.bandcamp.com

Teengirl Fantasy is an American electronic music duo. It consists of Logan Takahashi and Nick Weiss. They are best known for the track called "Cheaters".

== Career ==
Teengirl Fantasy was formed by Logan Takahashi and Nick Weiss while they were studying at Oberlin College. In 2010, the duo released the debut album, 7AM. The second album, Tracer, was released in 2012. It featured guest appearances from Kelela, Panda Bear, Laurel Halo, and Romanthony. In 2017, the duo released the third album, 8AM, which featured a guest appearance from Khalif Jones.

== Style and influences ==
Teengirl Fantasy's musical style has been described by The Guardian as "dream-disco featuring washed-out synths and samples doused in static and fuzz, with a heady aura about it of glo-fi and the hypnagogic pop of early Ariel Pink."

== Discography ==
=== Studio albums ===
- 7AM (2010)
- Tracer (2012)
- 8AM (2017)

=== Compilation albums ===
- Teengirl Fantasy CD-R (2009)

=== EPs ===
- TGIF (2009)
- Nun (2013)
- Thermal (2014)
- Thermal Remixed (2015)

=== Singles ===
- "Portofino" b/w "New Image Every Day" (2009)
- "Hollywood Hills" b/w "Love Don't Live Here" (2009)
- "Cheaters" (2011)
- "Motif" (2012)
- "EFX" (2012)
