= Raw Silk Uncut Wood =

Studio album by Laurel Halo
- Released: July 13, 2018
- Genre: Ambient; minimalism
- Length: 32:26
- Label: Latency
- Producer: Laurel Halo

Laurel Halo chronology
Dust (2017)	Raw Silk Uncut Wood (2018)	Atlas (2023)

Singles from Raw Silk Uncut Wood
- 1. "Raw Silk Uncut Wood" Released: July 13, 2018

Raw Silk Uncut Wood is a mini-album by Berlin-based American electronic musician Laurel Halo, released on July 13, 2018, through Latency Recordings. It consists of six ambient instrumental tracks.

== Release ==
Halo announced the release of a "mini-LP" titled Raw Silk Uncut Wood on June 13, 2018, alongside the release of the title track. In a press release, Halo stated that the album was inspired by her work on the 2018 documentary film, Possessed. The album features contributions from cellist Oliver Coates and percussionist Eli Keszler. It was described as "a meditative, cinematic listening experience."

The title is derived from Ursula Le Guin's translation of the Tao Te Ching.

== Critical reception ==
Professional ratings
Aggregate scores
Source	Rating
Metacritic	84/100
Review scores
Source	Rating
NME	4/5 stars
Pitchfork	8.0/10
PopMatters	8/10 stars
Resident Advisor	4.1/5
Tiny Mix Tapes	4/5 stars
The Wire	4/5 stars

Raw Silk Uncut Wood received acclaim from music critics upon release, with a Metacritic weighed aggregate score of 84 out of 100 based on seven reviews. Writing for Pitchfork, Sasha Geffen said "Raw Silk Uncut Wood marks a departure from her usual mode of thorny, cerebral electronic compositions, but as her most ambient record to date, it also boasts some of her most unabashedly beautiful music." Hans Kim of PopMatters said, "Whether Raw Silk Uncut Wood is the precursor to a forthcoming ambient full-length or just another stint of experimentation, Laurel Halo continues to break expectations in the most bemusing way. The mini-album is a beautiful practice of minimalism that also maintains her intricate perspective." Resident Advisor's Nina Posner wrote, "Inspired by this sentiment, as well as Halo's time scoring a film for the Dutch art collective Metahaven, the more abstract aspects of Raw Silk Uncut Wood allow her to establish moods that are at once non-prescriptive and immediately visceral."

== Accolades ==
Publication	Accolade	Rank	Ref.
The A.V. Club	Best Electronic Albums of 2018	N/A	
The Vinyl Factory	Top 50 Albums of 2018	20	
The Wire	Top 50 Albums of 2018	33	
Tiny Mix Tapes	Top 50 Albums of 2018	33	

== Track listing ==
All tracks are written by Laurel Halo.

No.	Title	Length
1.	"Raw Silk Uncut Wood"	10:00
2.	"Mercury"	3:56
3.	"Quietude"	2:32
4.	"The Sick Mind"	4:24
5.	"Supine"	1:27
6.	"Nahbarkeit"	10:07
Total length:		32:26

== Personnel ==
Credits adapted from the liner notes of Raw Silk Uncut Wood.

- Laurel Halo – production
- Oliver Coates – cello (tracks 1, 6)
- Eli Keszler – percussion (tracks 2, 6)
- Jill Mulleady – artwork
- Hugo Blanzat – design
