= Klein (musician) =

English musician

- Origin: South London, England
- Genres: Experimental; R&B; UK rap; dark ambient; noise rock
- Occupations: Musician, producer, singer, guitarist
- Years active: 2016–present
- Labels: Hyperdub; ijn inc.; Parkwuud Entertainment; Roc Nation
- Website: www.klein1997.bandcamp.com

Klein is a singer-songwriter, producer, and multidisciplinary artist from South London, England. She released the EP Tommy on UK label Hyperdub in 2017 and has received praise for her albums Lifetime (2019) and Frozen (2020).

== Biography ==
Klein lives in South London, and comes from a Nigerian background. A fan of gospel music and theatre, she wrote poetry before moving to production as a hobby, receiving some early encouragement from musicians Mica Levi and Arca. After independently releasing the projects ONLY and Lagata in 2016, she garnered a cult audience and critical praise from sources such as The Wire and Boomkat.

In 2017, Klein appeared on Laurel Halo’s album Dust. She released her label debut EP Tommy to the UK label Hyperdub later that year, receiving positive reviews from publications such as Tiny Mix Tapes and Pitchfork. In 2018 she directed and scored Care, a fantasy musical inspired by Disney princesses and the UK care system; it premiered at London's ICA in February 2018.

In September 2026, she released My Own Fairytale, an ambient album.

== Music ==
Klein's work features heavily manipulated audio samples, surreal metallic drones and R&B-inspired vocals, as well as, in recent years, rock and metal inspired guitar playing. AllMusic called her work "an utterly unique, surreal blend of R&B and experimental electronics." She initially assembled her tracks in the sound editing program Audacity, before shifting to producing and arranging music in Ableton Live. In 2017, she cited singer Brandy, composer Andrew Lloyd Webber, rapper Soulja Boy, and the reality TV show Love & Hip Hop: Atlanta as personal influences. Klein describes her music with the word "spiral" as both a verb and adjective.

== Discography ==
LPs

- Only (2016, self-release)
- Lifetime (2019, ijn inc.)
- Frozen (2020, ijn inc.)
- Harmattan (2021, Pentatone)
- Cave in the Wind (2022, Parkwuud Entertainment)
- Star in the Hood (2022, Parkwuud Entertainment)
- Touched by an Angel (2023, Parkwuud Entertainment)
- Marked (2024, Parkwuud Entertainment)
- Thirteen Sense (2025, Parkwuud Entertainment)
- Sleep With a Cane (2025, Parkwuud Entertainment)
- My Own Fairytale (2026, Parkwuud Entertainment)

EPs

- Lagata (2016, self-release)
- Tommy (2017, Hyperdub)
- CC (2018, self-release)

Mixtapes

- Now That's What I Call R&B (2021, self-release)
