= Lifetime (Klein album) =

Studio album by Klein
- Released: 6 September 2019
- Recorded: 2018–2019
- Length: 52:35
- Label: ijn inc.
- Producer: Klein

Klein chronology
cc (2018)	Lifetime (2019)

Lifetime is the debut studio album by South London musician Klein, released on 6 September 2019 on her imprint ijn inc., released digitally and on vinyl in a limited edition run.

== Background ==
Lifetime was created over a 18-month period. Klein likened the album to "giving someone your diary", and the press release states that it features "a deeply personal narrative and a more discursive and expressive approach to songwriting". The album is inspired by the works of gospel singer and composer James Cleveland and race film pioneer Spencer Williams, early 18th century tonalities, and the lasting impact of Klein's religious experience. Lifetime features less emphasized vocal work than her prior releases, and each track is intended to stand as its own "conversational piece." Its press release says the album "embraces the inevitable cycles of existence, phasing through moments of brutality, vulnerability, estrangement and unexpected fortitude."

== Artwork ==
The artwork for Lifetime was designed by Lacra; on its front cover, Klein, with white hair starting as braids that flow out into chaotic water-like streams and bloodshot eyes, is crouching and glancing to the viewer, with an aquatic dark blue fabric laid out in a black background. On its back cover, a gathering of uncanny nun-like figures on the same background communicate and stare at the ground.

== Track listing ==
No.	Title	Length
1.	"Lifetime"	3:29
2.	"Claim It"	6:30
3.	"Listen and See as They Take"	5:02
4.	"Silent"	3:05
5.	"For What Worth" (featuring Matana Roberts)	4:25
6.	"Enough Is Enough"	5:00
7.	"We Are Almost There"	3:10
8.	"Never Will I Disobey"	4:03
9.	"Honour"	9:43
10.	"Camelot Is Coming"	1:26
11.	"99"	1:23
12.	"Protect My Blood"	5:13
Total length:		52:35

== Personnel ==
- Klein – production, arrangements
- Matana Roberts – featured (track 5)
- Lacra – artwork
