= Quarantine (Laurel Halo album) =

Studio album by Laurel Halo
- Released: May 21, 2012
- Recorded: 2007–February 2012
- Studios: Endless Echo (Brooklyn); So Many Fields (Brooklyn); 4AD (London)
- Genres: Avant-pop; electronic; ambient pop
- Length: 41:19
- Label: Hyperdub
- Producer: Laurel Halo

Laurel Halo chronology
Antenna (2011)	Quarantine (2012)	Behind the Green Door (2013)

Quarantine is the debut album by American electronic musician Laurel Halo, released on May 21, 2012 by Hyperdub. It received acclaim from critics, and was named release of the year by British magazine The Wire.

== Background ==
Halo recorded Quarantine between July 2011 and February 2012 primarily in her home studio, with some instrument tracks also recorded in London. She made over thirty demos, eighteen of which were deleted. In November 2011, Halo sent the LP demos to Hyperdub label head Steve Goodman, who responded with positive interest.

Initially applying extensive echo and reverb to her vocals, which she found "supremely boring", Halo instead opted to leave them dry and unadorned, stating that "it was tempting to use autotune but I decided against it because there's this brutal, sensual ugliness in the vocals uncorrected, and painfully human vocals made sense." Speaking to Fact, she described the album's thematic focus as "contrails, trauma, volatile chemicals, viruses."

The album cover features an adaptation of Harakiri School Girls, a work by Makoto Aida which Halo chose for the artwork after seeing it at an exhibition on Japanese pop art in New York. She stated that "I love that it's brutal and violent but colourful and slow to sink in."

== Critical reception ==
Professional ratings
Aggregate scores
Source	Rating
AnyDecentMusic?	7.7/10
Metacritic	80/100
Review scores
Source	Rating
AllMusic	4.5/5 stars
Fact	4/5
The Guardian	4/5 stars
The Irish Times	4/5 stars
Mojo	4/5 stars
NME	6/10
Pitchfork	8.0/10
Resident Advisor	4.0/5
Spin	7/10
XLR8R	8/10

Quarantine received positive critical reviews from critics, with an aggregate score of 80 out of 100 on Metacritic. The Wire named Quarantine as the "release of the year" in its annual critics' poll. Ian Cohen of Pitchfork called the album "something definitive" and Halo's "best and most cohesive work to date." The Quietus called it "one of this year's most intriguing and divisive listens," and noted that "what's blasted her music headlong into the future is its re-integration of those most ancient of musical devices – the unadorned human voice, verse/chorus structures – into environments they’re usually so thoroughly unfamiliar with." The Guardian wrote that "it manages to sidestep pretension at almost every turn, partly due to the near-naive vocals that dominate the warm crackle and glow." Resident Advisor states "Quarantine binds her past sounds into a toxic, lush blend of ambient suspension and disorienting detail," and called the album Halo's "most immersive and beautiful work to date." The album was named the 25th best album of the 2010s by Tiny Mix Tapes.

=== Year-end lists ===
Year	Publication	Work	List	Rank	Ref.
2012	Pitchfork	Quarantine	Overlooked Records 2012	--	
2012	Pitchfork	Quarantine	The Best Album Covers of 2012	--	
2012	Pitchfork	Quarantine	Albums of the Year: Honorable Mention	--	

== Track listing ==
All tracks are written by Laurel Halo.

No.	Title	Length
1.	"Airsick"	3:58
2.	"Years"	2:52
3.	"Thaw"	5:59
4.	"Joy"	3:27
5.	"MK Ultra"	4:17
6.	"Wow"	1:23
7.	"Carcass"	4:30
8.	"Holoday"	1:50
9.	"Tumor"	2:40
10.	"Morcom"	3:03
11.	"Nerve"	2:31
12.	"Light + Space"	4:49
Total length:		41:19

== Personnel ==
Credits adapted from the liner notes of Quarantine.

- Laurel Halo – production, recording, mixing, vocals, Wurlitzer electric piano, Access Virus XL, Akai AX60, Akai MPC 1000, ARP 2600, Elektron Octatrack, Fender Jaguar, Korg Electribe ES-1, Korg MS-20, Korg Mono/Poly, Korg Polysix, MFB Synth II, Roland D-50, Roland Juno-106, Roland SH-101, Yamaha CS-80
- Zeljko McMullen – mixing
- Jason Goz – mastering
- Makoto Aida – artwork
- Kei Miyajima – photography
- Manuel Sepulveda – layout
