= Ford & Lopatin =

American electronic music duo

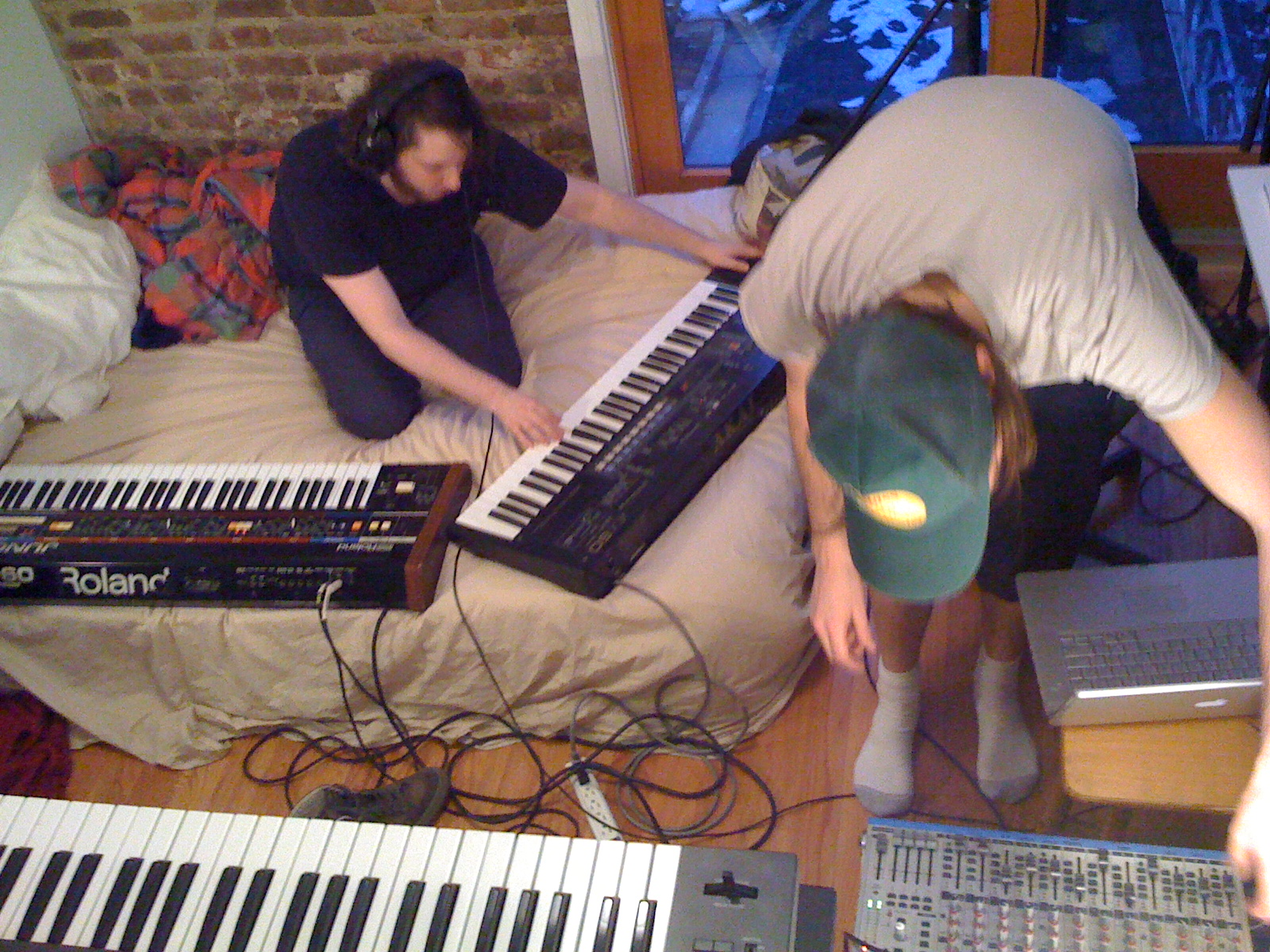
- Ford (R) and Lopatin in 2010

Background information
- Also known as: Games
- Genres: Electropop; synth-funk; R&B; vaporwave
- Years active: 2009–2011
- Labels: Hippos in Tanks; Software
- Members: Joel Ford; Daniel Lopatin

Ford & Lopatin (formerly known as Games) is an American electronic duo composed of musicians Daniel Lopatin (better known as Oneohtrix Point Never) and Joel Ford (of the group Tigercity). The group's sound draws on disparate genres such as 1980s synthpop and MIDI-funk, chopped and screwed production, 1970s fusion, and techno. They have released a number of original recordings and remix mixtapes, including the 2011 album Channel Pressure.

== History ==
=== Background ===
First meeting each other in the sixth grade at a science class in a Wayland, Massachusetts school, Daniel Lopatin and Joel Ford listened to music from British artist Goldie, Boston campus radio, and jazz fusion albums owned by Lopatin's father during their teen years. While in the sixth grade, Lopatin had tried out for being a bassist in Ford's grunge band, The Grainers, but was rejected. However, the band started to create and perform funkier, weirder and more prog-fusion material, and by the time they were in their late high school years, Ford said the group "couldn't exist without Dan and his synthesizer."

When the two were 15 years old, they began a group called Polyphonic, with Ford using their high school's Ensoniq SQ-2 as a drum machine and Lopatin using a Roland Juno-60 synthesizer. The two recalled jamming in Lopatin's basement and performing at their high school's talent show with other rappers and a DJ. During this period, the two became serious about composing electronic music together.

The band ended when Ford and Lopatin graduated from high school. However, the two still kept in touch with each other during their college years, Ford attending University of Massachusetts Amherst and Lopatin a student at Hampshire College, and would briefly form another band that Ford described as "kind of like Suicide, but with live drums." Lopatin had started making music in his bedroom which was the beginning of his project Oneohtrix Point Never. Ford was present during one of Lopatin's first such sessions and later described it as "one of the purest listening experiences I've ever had." Ford would move to Brooklyn to form Tigercity after college, where he lived to do the project for six years.

In the summer of 2009, they developed an idea for a group they called "Games" after what Lopatin described as "an intense 72-hour internet writing frenzy." They spent a week recording demos at Ford's home in Massachusetts, developing their sound using "a ridiculously sick collection of vintage synths" the two had collected during their years as musicians. Other musical commitments slowed the work, but by February 2010, the two had moved into an apartment that lacked heat and hot water so they could focus on the project.

=== 2009–2010: That We Can Play ===
From February 1 to April 16, 2010, Games self-released their series of 35-minute chopped and screwed mixtapes, Heaven Can Wait. In a Pitchfork review, the 3rd part of the series was described by Larry Fitzmaurice as "tape-warped, syrup-slow R&B jams". It had also been announced that day that they were "still hard at work" on their yet-unnamed debut EP. On July 1, 2010, the Curatorial Club, a label by the blog Chocolate Bobka, released a double cassette mix of slowed-down tracks by Games titled Spend the Night With...Games.

Their early work, which included the 7" single of "Everything Is Working"/"Heartlands" and their debut extended play That We Can Play, were all officially released by the label Hippos in Tanks. That We Can Play was released on November 2, 2010 to a very positive critical reception, with reviewers praising the duo's use of the 1980s power pop influences. One such writer, Michael Brodeur of The Boston Globe, described the EP as "unrelentingly retro, but intriguingly interstitial", telling readers to not "mistake Games for some out-of-date outfit; this is what’s next – all over again." Some of their early tracks received official music videos, including a now-removed one for "Everything Is Working" that was made by Jheri Evans of the blog Get Off the Coast and showed old footage of cities, suburbs, and car conventions.

=== 2010–2011: Channel Pressure ===
In an August 2010 interview, Ford said that he had recently met in Brooklyn with Jan Hammer's son, who was a fan of the Tigercity project, so he could talk about recording the synths for Games' first full-length album at Hammer's studio in upstate New York, and announced they would begin recording the LP at the studio in December: "We're honing in [sic] on the concept still, but it definitely involves athletic cuts and smooth jazz-fusion." The album, later named Channel Pressure, was recorded in improvised sessions over the course of three months at the studio and the headquarters of the label Mexican Summer, with the tracks later spliced, sampled and reconstructed. The press release described the record as "an imaginary soundtrack for the adventure of Joey Rogers, a kid who gets brainwashed by a gigantic television", and musically categorized it as a post-pop album with elements of glitch, krautrock, synthpop, ambient music and progressive-fusion. In February 2011, the duo changed their name to Ford & Lopatin, reportedly to preempt legal issues with the Interscope Records artist Game, and also announced that they had founded a sub-label of Mexican Summer, named Software. Channel Pressure was the first release on the label.

== Style ==
In an October 2010 interview, Lopatin described the idea behind Games as "looking to cook down stuff we like such as ‘70s fusion and hip hop and IDM and techno and MIDI funk into something primordial and pop-oriented and fun and weird." He also said, "We like slowing down fast jams. It’s creepier and subliminal that way. If you just straight up slow everything down into oblivion it’s kinda hectic." As Games in August 2010, Ford and Lopatin cited the works of DJ Paul, DJ Screw, Electric Light Orchestra, Aphex Twin, DJ Premier, The Weather Channel, Weather Report, Return to Forever, Boards of Canada and James Ferraro, as well as genres like Italo disco and albums like Moment of Truth by Gang Starr and On the Corner by Miles Davis, as influences. The two said DJ Premier and Teo Macero were their favorite producers: "Their cuts and edits always recontextualize performances and samples in the most psychedelic way." Lopatin also said: [Gang Starr's] "Robin Hood Theory" is a blueprint-level jam for us. There's other, lesser discussed [DJ Premier] beats that are just as good, but Moment of Truth was a classic when we were in high school and really got us moving in the direction of samplers and stuff like that." As for developing remixes, Ford said that they "preserve minimal amounts of original track; create whole world underneath."

== Discography ==
- "Everything Is Working"/"Heartlands" 7" (Hippos in Tanks, 2010)
- That We Can Play 12" EP (Hippos in Tanks, 2010)
- Channel Pressure (Software Recording Co., June 7, 2011)
- "Emergency Room" 12" (Software Recording Co., 2011)
