= Chance of Rain (Laurel Halo album) =

Studio album by Laurel Halo
- Released: October 28, 2013
- Genre: Experimental techno; musique concrète; post-ambient
- Length: 44:10
- Label: Hyperdub
- Producer: Laurel Halo

Laurel Halo chronology
Behind the Green Door (2012)	Chance of Rain (2013)	Dust (2017)

Chance of Rain is the second studio album by American electronic music artist Laurel Halo. The album was released on October 28, 2013, by Hyperdub and is Halo's second instrumental release of 2013, alongside her extended play Behind the Green Door. The album cover is the work of Halo's father, Arthur Chartow, drawn in the 1970s.

== Critical reception ==
Professional ratings
Aggregate scores
Source	Rating
AnyDecentMusic?	7.3/10
Metacritic	78/100
Review scores
Source	Rating
AllMusic	3.5/5 stars
Exclaim!	9/10
Fact	4/5
The Irish Times	3/5 stars
NME	7/10
Pitchfork	7.4/10
Resident Advisor	4.5/5
Tiny Mix Tapes	5/5 marks
Uncut	8/10
XLR8R	8/10

Upon its release, Chance of Rain was received positively by music critics. On Metacritic, the album received a score of 78 out of 100, based on 21 reviews, indicating "generally favorable reviews". Heather Phares of AllMusic wrote that the album combines "jazz-inspired experimental techno and musique concrète tracks". In his review for Tiny Mix Tapes, DeForrest Brown Jr. defined the music on Chance of Rain as proto-absolute and post-ambient.

=== Accolades ===
Publication	Accolade	Rank	Ref.
Fact	The 50 Best Albums of 2013	36	
The Quietus	Quietus Albums of the Year 2013	21	
Tiny Mix Tapes	2013: Favorite 50 Albums of 2013	14	

== Track listing ==
All tracks are written by Laurel Halo.

No.	Title	Length
1.	"Dr. Echt"	1:38
2.	"Oneiroi"	7:35
3.	"Serendip"	6:29
4.	"Chance of Rain"	7:36
5.	"Melt"	2:21
6.	"Still/Dromos"	3:51
7.	"Thrax"	5:56
8.	"Ainnome"	7:14
9.	"-Out"	1:30
Total length:		44:10

== Personnel ==
Credits adapted from liner notes of Chance of Rain.

- Laurel Halo – music
- Rashad Becker – mastering
- Arthur Chartow – artwork
- Bill Kouligas – layout
