= Beatrice Dillon =

- Born: London, England
- Genre: Electronic
- Occupations: Record producer; DJ; composer
- Years active: 2010s–present
- Labels: Alien Jams; Boomkat Editions; Hessle Audio; HI; PAN; Poly Kicks; Portraits GRM; Snow Dog; The Trilogy Tapes; Where to Now?
- Member of: Dillon Wendel

Beatrice Dillon is an English record producer, DJ, and composer. Her debut solo studio album, Workaround, was released in 2020.

== Early life ==
Beatrice Dillon was born in London. She studied fine art at Chelsea College of Arts. She worked at multiple record shops around London.

== Career ==
Dillon's first solo release of original material was Blues Dances, a cassette tape released in 2014 through the record label Where to Now?.

In 2015, Dillon released Studies I–XVII for Samplers and Percussion, a collaborative album with Rupert Clervaux, through Snow Dog Records. In 2016, the duo released Two Changes through Paralaxe Editions.

In 2016, Dillon released "Curl", a split single with Karen Gwyer, through Alien Jams. She also released a solo single, "Can I Change My Mind?" (2016), through Boomkat Editions.

Dillon is a member of Dillon Wendel, along with Kassem Mosse. The duo released a two-track EP, Pulse / High (2017), through The Trilogy Tapes. In 2017, she also released a collaborative single with Call Super, "Inkjet" / "Fluo", through Hessle Audio.

In 2019, The Guardian described her as "the most thrilling new voice in British electronic music today."

In 2020, Dillon released her debut solo studio album, Workaround, through PAN. It received universal acclaim from critics. In 2021, she released 50 Locked Grooves, a 12-inch record containing 50 locked grooves, through Poly Kicks.

In 2024, Dillon released Seven Reorganisations through her own record label HI. In 2025, she released Basho through Portraits GRM.

== Discography ==
=== Studio albums ===
- Studies I–XVII for Samplers and Percussion (with Rupert Clervaux; Snow Dog Records, 2015)
- Two Changes (with Rupert Clervaux; Paralaxe Editions, 2016)
- Workaround (PAN, 2020)

=== Compilation albums ===
- Blues Dances (Where to Now?, 2014)
- 50 Locked Grooves (Poly Kicks, 2021)

=== EPs ===
- Pulse / High (with Kassem Mosse, as Dillon Wendel; The Trilogy Tapes, 2017)
- Seven Reorganisations (HI, 2024)
- Basho (Portraits GRM, 2025)

=== Singles ===
- "Curl" (split with Karen Gwyer; Alien Jams, 2016)
- "Can I Change My Mind?" (Boomkat Editions, 2016)
- "Inkjet" / "Fluo" (with Call Super; Hessle Audio, 2017)
