= Michael Salu =

British designer, writer and illustrator

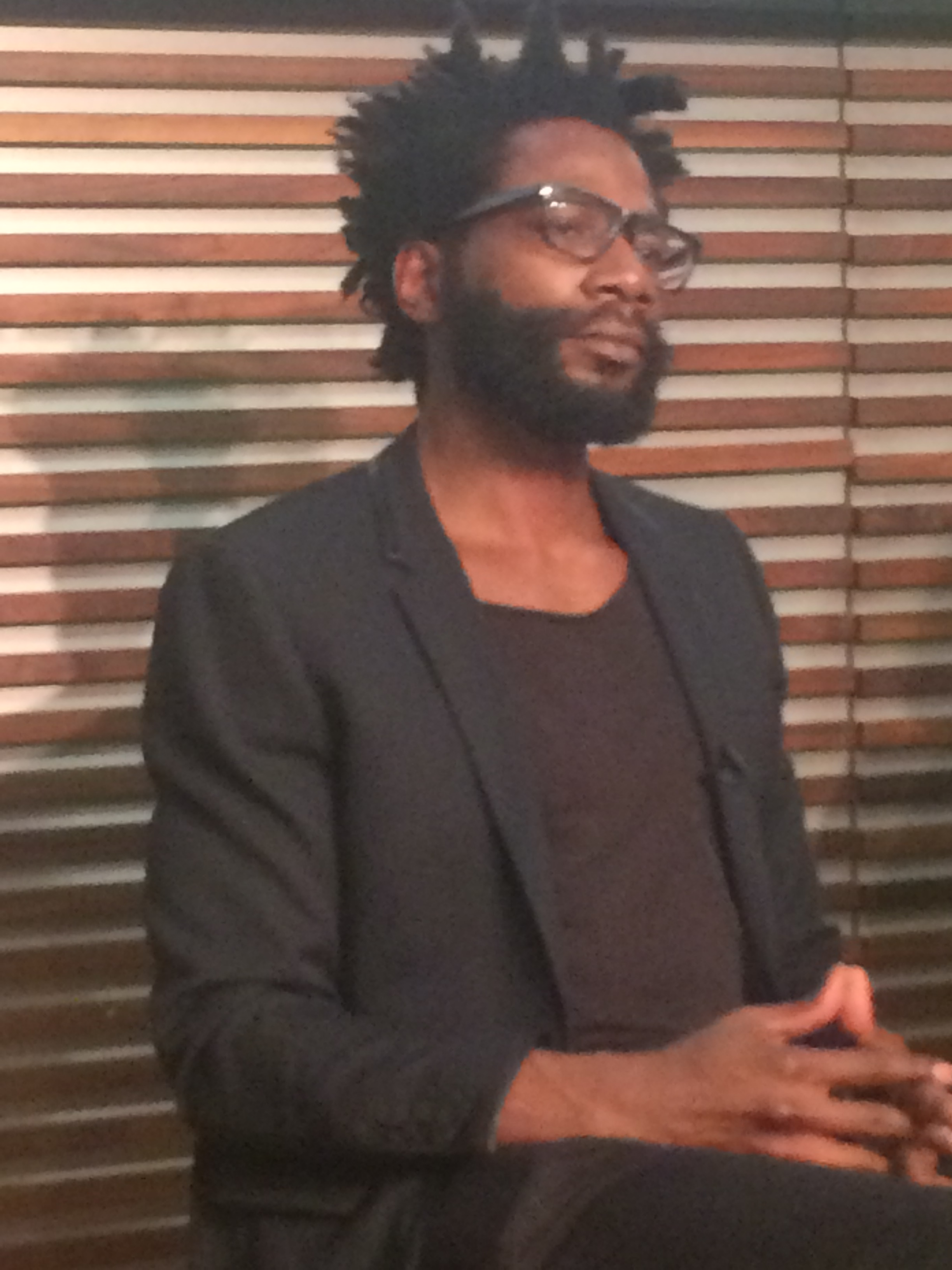
- Salu in November 2015
- Born: London, England
- Education: University of Wolverhampton, BA (Hons) in Graphic Communication
- Occupations: Creative director, designer, writer and illustrator
- Awards: British Book Design Award, "Best Cover of the Year" 2011
- Website: www.michaelsalu.com

Michael Salu, British-born of Nigerian heritage, is a creative director, art and photography editor, designer, brand strategist, writer and illustrator.

== Education and career ==
Born in London, England, to parents from Nigeria, Michael Salu lived in both countries during his childhood. He earned a BA (Hons) degree in Graphic Communication from the University of Wolverhampton.

=== Artistic direction, editing and art publishing ===
Cover of If On A Winter's Night A Traveller, from the Italo Calvino series

In his role as artistic director of Granta Publications (2010–13), Salu was responsible for the creative concepts behind Granta magazine, Granta Books and Portobello Books, commissioning and creating work for print, covers and digital. During this period, he was also the art editor for Granta magazine, publishing new and established artists’ and photographers' work. Highlights of his works include curating a showcase of art to respond to the question "What is British Identity?" for Granta 119 and a photographic collaboration with Nadav Kander for Granta's Best of Young British Novelists 4, which also appeared in The New York Times.

At Granta magazine, Salu was also responsible for art editing and commissioning on projects including Contacts and the Pakistan issue.

Prior to Granta, Salu worked for Random House, where he designed and art directed covers for authors such as Kurt Vonnegut and Fyodor Dostoevsky, as well as for more contemporary fiction including Xiaolu Guo and Chuck Palahniuk.

=== Brand strategy ===
Salu was involved with shaping a new brand identity for Soda Pictures, launched in 2014, and was creative director for the Art Dubai Abraaj Art Prize 2014.

=== Other work ===
Salu has done mentoring with The Photographers' Gallery, has lectured at various educational institutions such as The Royal College of Art, as well as being involved in a wide range of creative projects, including with Curzon Cinemas and musician Ticky.

Granta Magazine 110: "Sex"

Salu has written fiction and essays for publications such as Varoom, Eye Magazine, Under The Influence magazine, Freeman's Journal, Catapult and Entropy. He also contributes original art to Grey Magazine.

He has conceived a variety of digital projects for Granta and other brands. For Granta 110: "Sex", he conceived and commissioned a viral website featuring several films to promote the issue. He was Creative Director on the Granta documentary on A. M. Homes, May We Be Forgiven, in conjunction with her novel of the same title, in 2012.

His essay "Mixed Media, Dimensions Variable" is in Tales of Two Cities (2014), an anthology on the socio-economic imbalances of New York, edited by John Freeman and published by OR Books, also including work by Zadie Smith, Jonathan Safran Foer, Taiye Selasi, Mark Doty and other writers.

Salu runs the multi-disciplinary creative consultancy SALU.io.

== Awards and recognition ==
Salu's many awards include "Best Cover of the Year" in the British Book Design Awards 2011 for Granta 110: "Sex", and the Images 36 Gold Award (art direction) in October 2012 from the Association of Illustrators.
