= Hypnagogic pop =

Music genre

- Etymology: Hypnagogia, the transitional state from wakefulness to sleep
- Other names: H-pop; chillwave; glo-fi
- Stylistic origins: Lo-fi; post-noise; psychedelia; electronic; hauntology; soft rock; new-age; new wave; drone; experimental; muzak; film soundtracks; R&B; synth-pop; neo-psychedelia
- Cultural origins: 2000s, United States
- Typical instruments: Guitars; synthesizers
- Derivative forms: Vaporwave; bedroom pop

Local scenes
- Crimson Wave

Other topics
- Cassette underground; cultural memory; art pop; avant-pop; experimental pop; Italian occult psychedelia; blog rock; psychedelic pop; toytown pop; shoegaze

Hypnagogic pop (or simply h-pop) is a loosely defined style of pop and psychedelic music that evokes cultural memory and nostalgia for the popular entertainment of the past (principally the 1980s and early 1990s). It emerged in the 2000s through a wave of American Millennial home recording artists in the lo-fi and post-noise scene, who adopted retro aesthetics from their childhood, such as radio and soft rock, new wave, video game music, synth-pop, R&B, film soundtracks, new-age and early Internet. Recordings were typically marked by the use of outmoded analog equipment and DIY experimentation, while distributed on cassettes and CD-R's with circulation primarily based on the Internet through blog sites.

The genre's name was coined by journalist David Keenan in an August 2009 issue of The Wire to label the developing trend, the term was inspired by a comment made by musician James Ferraro about the notion that 1980s sounds had seeped into the unconscious of contemporary musicians while they were toddlers falling asleep. Keenan characterized the concept as "pop music refracted through the memory of a memory." It was used interchangeably with "chillwave" or "glo-fi" and gained critical attention through artists such as Ariel Pink and James Ferraro. The music has been variously described as a 21st-century update of psychedelia, a reappropriation of media-saturated capitalist culture, and an "American cousin" to British hauntology.

In response to Keenan's article, The Wire received a "slew of semi-hate mail" that derided hypnagogic pop as the "worst genre created by a journalist". Some of the tagged artists rejected the label or denied that such a unified style exists. During the 2010s, the style's "revisionist nostalgia" sublimated into various youth-oriented cultural zeitgeists. The scene influenced the rise of bedroom pop, while elements evolved into vaporwave, with which it is sometimes conflated.

== Etymology ==
In August 2009, journalist David Keenan, who was known as a reporter of noise, freak folk, and drone music scenes, coined the term "hypnagogic pop" in issue 306 of British music magazine The Wire. His article was entitled Childhood's End. Keenan applied the label to a developing trend of 2000s lo-fi and post-noise music in which artists engaged with elements of cultural nostalgia, childhood memory, and outdated recording technology. Inspired by comments by James Ferraro and Spencer Clark of the Skaters, and while invoking a similar concept discussed by Russian esotericist P.D. Ouspensky, Keenan employed the term "hypnagogic" as referring to the psychological state "between waking and sleeping, liminal zones where mis-hearings and hallucinations feed into the formation of dreams." The term reportedly originated with a comment by James Ferraro about the notion that 1980s sounds had seeped into the unconscious of contemporary musicians while they were toddlers falling asleep and their parents played music in another room.

Among the artists discussed in Keenan's article were Ariel Pink, Daniel Lopatin, the Skaters, the Savage Young Taterbug, Gary War, Zola Jesus, Ducktails, Emeralds, and Pocahaunted. (Note: Also mentioned were Dolphins into the Future, Sora Eros, Infinity Window, Orphan Fairytale, and the Super Vacations.) According to Keenan, these artists drew on cultural sources subconsciously remembered from their 1980s and early 1990s adolescence while freeing them from their historical contexts and "hom[ing] in on the futuristic signifiers" of the period. He alternately summarized hypnagogic pop as "pop music refracted through the memory of a memory" and as "1980's-inspired psychedelia" that engages with capitalist detritus of the past in an attempt to "dream of the future." In a later article, Keenan identified Lopatin, Ferraro, Clark, and ex-Test Icicles member Sam Mehran as hypnagogic pop's "most adventurous proponents".

== Characteristics ==
Hypnagogic pop is pop or psychedelic music that draws heavily from the popular music and culture of the 1980s – also ranging from the 1970s to the early 1990s. The genre reflects a preoccupation with outmoded analog technology and bombastic representations of synthetic elements from these epochs of pop culture, with its creators informed by collective memory as well as their personal histories. Per the imprecise nature of memory, the genre does not faithfully recreate the sounds and styles popular in those periods. In this way, hypnagogic pop distinguishes itself from revivalist movements. As authors Maël Guesdon and Philippe Le Guern write, the genre can be described as "revisionist nostalgia, not in the sense that 'everything used to be better' but because it rewrites collective memory with a view to being more faithful to an idea or a memory of the original than to the original itself."

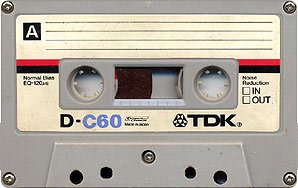
A compact cassette. Hypnagogic pop artists often use or emulate outdated cassette recording technology.

Examples of specific sounds evoked by hypnagogic pop artists range from "ecstatically blurry and irradiated lo-fi pop" to "seventies cosmic-synth-rock" and "tripped-out, tribal exotica". Writing for Vice in 2011, Morgan Poyau described the genre as "making awkward bedfellows out of experimental music enthusiasts and weird progressive pop theorists." He described a typical manifestation of the style as featuring long tracks "saturated with echo, delay, smothered guitars and amputated synths." Critic Adam Trainer writes that, rather than a particular sound, the music was defined by a collection of artists who shared the same approaches and cultural experiences. He observed that their music drew from "the collective unconscious of late 1980s and early 1990s popular culture" while being "indebted stylistically to various traditions of experimentalism such as noise, drone, repetition, and improvisation."

Common reference points include various forms of 1980s music, including radio rock, new wave pop, MTV one-hit wonders, New Age music, synth-driven Hollywood blockbuster soundtracks, lounge music, easy-listening, corporate muzak, lite rock "schmaltz", video game music, and 1980s synth-pop and R&B. Recordings are often deliberately degraded, produced with analog equipment, and exhibit recording idiosyncrasies such as tape hiss. It employs sounds that were considered "futuristic" during the 1980s which, due to their outmoded nature, appear psychedelic out of context. Also common was the use of outmoded audiovisual technology and DIY digital imagery, such as compact cassettes, VHS, CD-R discs, and early Internet aesthetics.

== Background ==
In the 2000s, a wave of retro-inspired home recording artists began dominating underground indie scenes. The emergence of Ariel Pink's Haunted Graffiti, in particular, prompted journalistic discussion of the philosophical concept of hauntology, most prominently among the writers Simon Reynolds and Mark Fisher. Later, the term "hauntology" was described as a British synonym for hypnagogic pop, while hypnagogic pop was described as an "American cousin" to Britain's hauntological music scene.

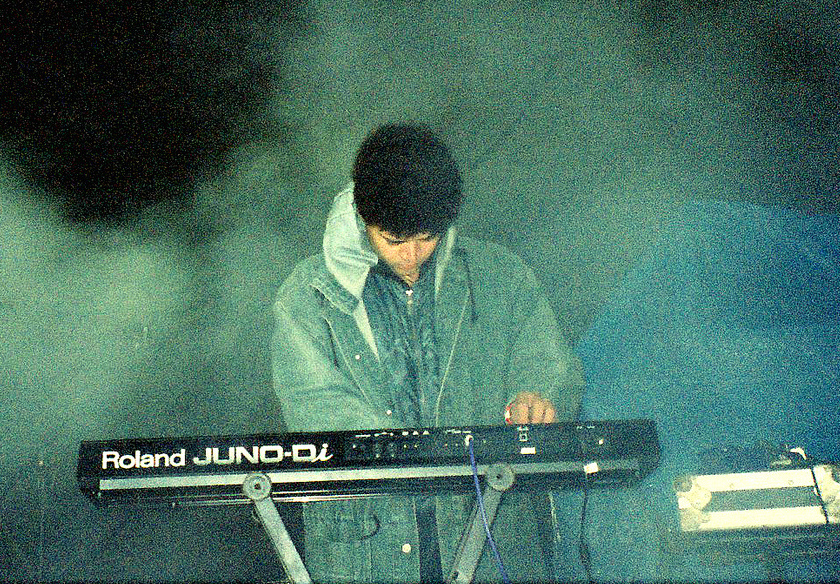
The term "hypnagogic pop" was inspired by comments made by musician and artist James Ferraro (pictured in 2012).

Todd Ledford, owner of the music label Olde English Spelling Bee (OESB), attributed a correlation between the proliferation of hypnagogic pop and the rise of YouTube. Reynolds attributed the origins of hypnagogic pop to Southern California and its culture. Trainer disagreed with Reynolds' assertion and said the style "arguably" emerged from numerous simultaneous scenes inhabited by artists working in a diverse form of "post-noise psychedelia". Pitchfork's Marc Masters offered that it may have originated "less [as] a movement than a coincidence". The music was often issued in the form of limited-edition cassettes or vinyl records before reaching a wider audience through blogs and YouTube videos.

The Skaters were a noise duo consisting of James Ferraro and Spencer Clark, and like Pink, were based in California. In the mid-2000s, they released dozens of CD-Rs and cassettes of psychedelic drone music, after which Ferraro and Clark each pursued solo outings. They have been regarded as part of the "post-noise psychedelia" movement. From 2009 to 2010, Ferraro's music evolved to be increasingly rhythmic and melodic, as Trainer describes, "an oversaturated sonic palette of cheesy pop reminiscent of early video game soundtracks and 1980s Saturday morning cartoons."

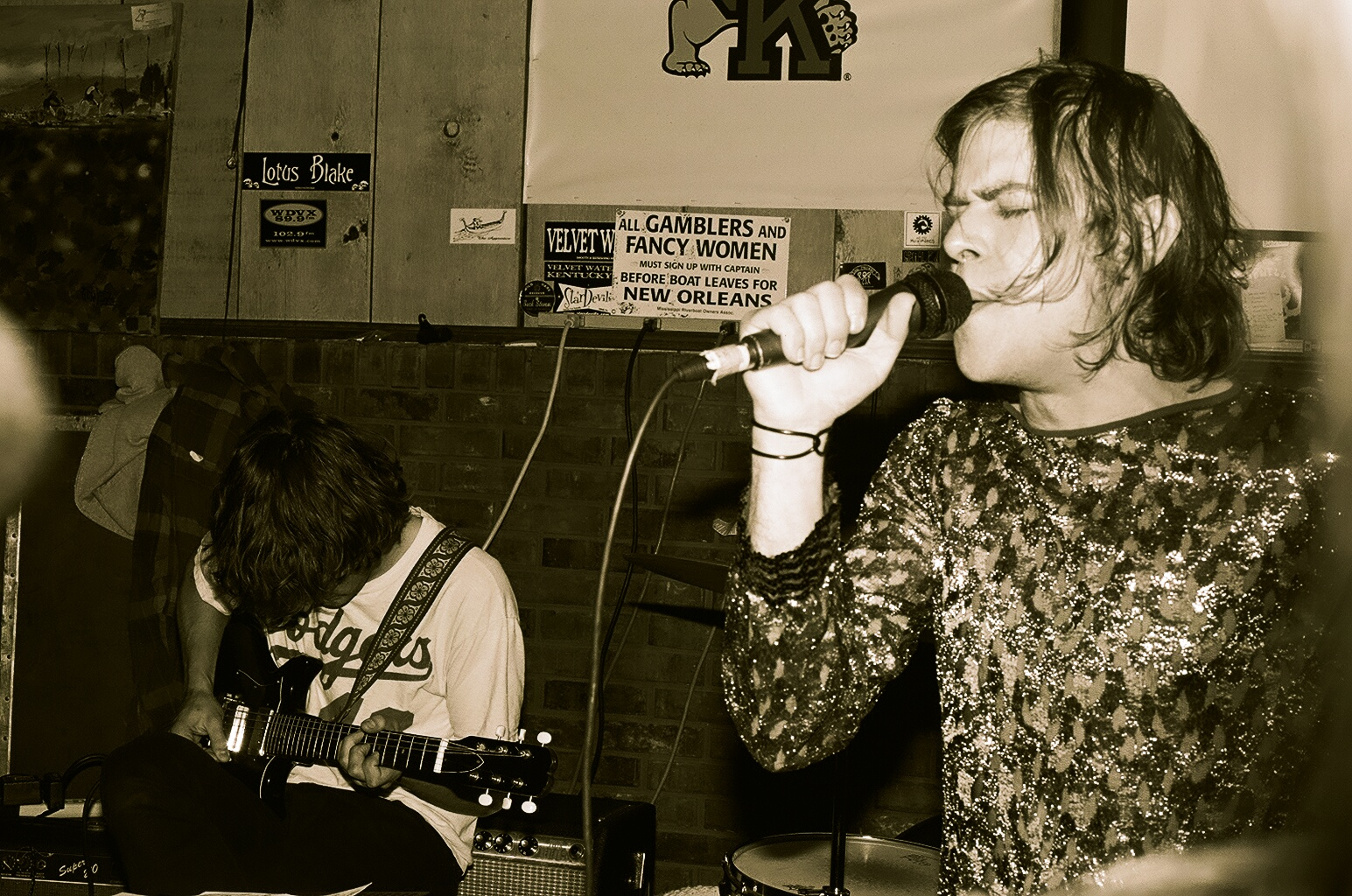
Ariel Pink performing in 2007

Ariel Pink gained recognition in the mid-2000s through a string of self-produced albums, pioneering a sound that Reynolds called "'70s radio-rock and '80s new wave as if heard through a defective transistor radio, glimmers of melody flickering in and out of the fog". He identified Pink and the Skaters as the "godparents of hypnagogic", and credited a comment made by Ferraro with inspiring the use of the term "hypnagogic". However, Reynolds singled out Pink as the central figure to what he calls the "Altered Zones Generation", an umbrella term he designed for lo-fi, retro-inspired indie artists who were commonly featured on Altered Zones, an associate site for Pitchfork. (Note: In response to Reynolds' argument, critic Adam Harper wrote that Pink's "largely rock-based" music lacked "the pop-art pastiche of hypnagogic pop," and that instead of "the progenitor [of] the AZ Generation, Pink can easily be understood as the youngest member of this mid-80s Cassette Culture Generation." Pink believed that his own music, while heavily indebted to 1960s pop, is not classifiable in any genre.) Tiny Mix Tapes' Jordan Redmond wrote that Pink's early collaborator John Maus was also placed "at the nexus of a number of recent popular movements" including hypnagogic pop, and that Maus was as "much of a progenitor of this sound as Pink, even though Pink has tended to be the headline-grabber."

R. Stevie Moore, Gary Wilson and Martin Newell's the Cleaners from Venus were earlier artists who anticipated Pink's sound. Matthew Ingram of The Wire recognized Moore's influence on Pink and hypnagogic pop: "through his disciple ... he has unwittingly provided the [genre's] template". (Note: Specifically, Moore's 1976 debut album Phonography. Pink was a devout fan of his work and shared the same musical approaches, although Moore denies that they sound similar. After the two collaborated in the 2000s, Moore's exposure increased as a result of Pink's solo success.)

Another precursor to the genre was Nick Nicely and his 1982 single "Hilly Fields (1892)". Red Bull Music's J.R. Moore wrote that Nicely's "uniquely haphazard DIY aesthetic" and contemporary take on 1960s psychedelic pop "basically invented the sound of the 2000s Hypnagogic Pop movement decades beforehand." (Note: Nicely returned to live performances in 2008, after a long absence from the public, sharing concert billings with Pink and Maus.) Others include Robert Truman's "Way Down" (1987).

Complex contributor Joe Price felt that the h-pop movement was "birthed" by Ferraro and "the vastly overlooked [Missouri artist] 18 Carat Affair". In Reynolds' description, "other rising figures" from the original California scene included Sun Araw, LA Vampires and Puro Instinct. He added: "Other key hypnagogues such as Matrix Metals and Rangers reside elsewhere but seem SoCal in spirit." In a 2009 interview, Daniel Lopatin (Oneohtrix Point Never) stated that Salvador Dalí and Danny Wolfers were the "godfathers of hpop". He identified other progenitors to be DJ Screw, "retro kids", Joe Wenderoth, Autre Ne Veut, Church In Moon and DJ Dog Dick.

== History ==
Sample of Ariel Pink's Haunted Graffiti's "Round and Round" (2010)
The Atlantic highlighted "Round and Round" as a "perfect" representation of hypnagogic pop's "breathless simplicity", while Pitchfork wrote that it "evokes the sort of dusty 80s radio pop singles you find on defunct regional labels in thrift store bins."

In 2009, David Keenan coined the term "hypnagogic pop", which led to a variety of music blogs writing about the phenomenon. By 2010, albums by Ariel Pink and Neon Indian were regularly hailed by publications like Pitchfork and The Wire, with "hypnagogic pop", "chillwave", and "glo-fi" employed to describe the evolving sounds of such artists, a number of which had songs of considerable success within independent music circles. Pink was frequently called "godfather" of h-pop, chillwave or glo-fi as new acts that were associated with him (aesthetically, personally, geographically, or professionally) attracted notice from critics. Some of his contemporaries, such as Ferraro, Clark, and War, failed to match his mainstream success. When this point was raised to Clark in a 2013 interview, he replied that Pink was simply "an ambassador of California, like the Beach Boys."

In 2010, Pitchfork launched Altered Zones, effectively an online newsletter for hypnagogic acts. Beginning that July, Altered Zones aggregated its content from a collective of leading blogs specializing in the movement. By the end of the year, OESB, now known for its roster of hypnagogic acts such as Ferraro and Mehran, had grown to be one of the most prominent underground indie labels. In January 2011, Keenan wrote that OESB was "the imprint most associated with H-pop" and "in many ways ... the label of 2010", although he mused, "[I]ts demographic has morphed from an early underground/Noise audience to being embraced by the fringes of indie and dance culture, helped by groups like Forest Swords, who muddy the line between H-pop and dubstep."

=== Chillwave and vaporwave ===
"Chillwave", a tag used to describe a similar trend, was coined one month before Keenan's 2009 article and was adopted synonymously with "hypnagogic pop". While the two styles are similar in that they both evoke 1980s–90s imagery, chillwave has a more commercial sound with an emphasis on "cheesy" hooks and reverb effects. A contemporary review by Marc Hogan for Neon Indian's Psychic Chasms (2009) listed "dream-beat", "chillwave", "glo-fi", "hypnagogic pop", and "hipster-gogic pop" as interchangeable terms for "psychedelic music that's generally one or all of the following: synth-based, homemade-sounding, 80s-referencing, cassette-oriented, sun-baked, laid-back, warped, hazy, emotionally distant, slightly out of focus."

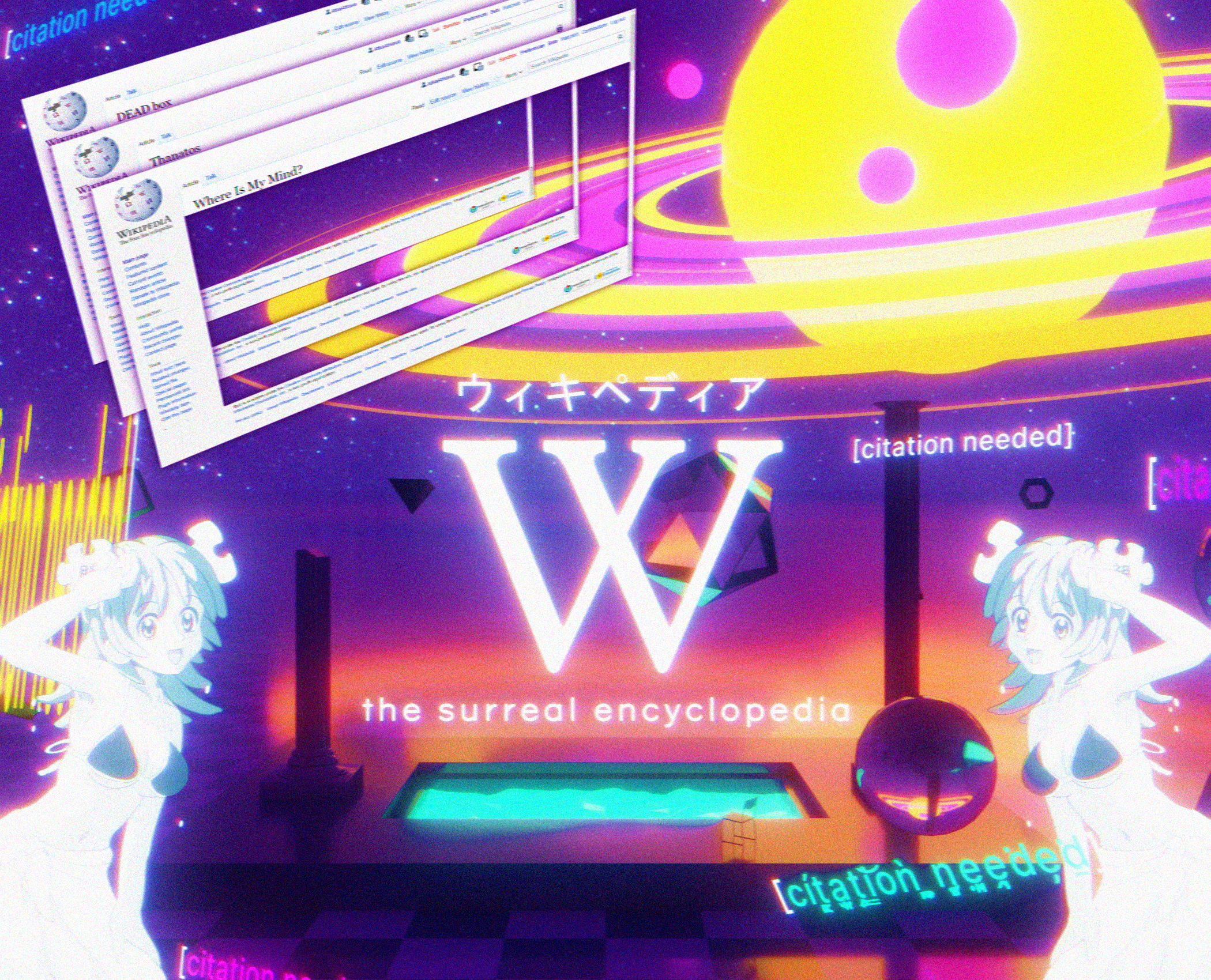
The vaporwave Internet meme amplified notions of self-referential irony and satire in hypnagogic pop.

The experimental tendencies of hypnagogic pop artists like Pink and Ferraro were soon amplified by the Internet-centric genre dubbed "vaporwave". Although the name shares the "-wave" suffix, it is only loosely connected to chillwave. Sam Mehran was one of the earliest hypnagogic acts to anticipate vaporwave, with his project Matrix Metals and the 2009 album Flamingo Breeze, which was built on synthesizer loops. That same year, Lopatin uploaded a collection of plunderphonics loops to YouTube inconspicuously under the alias sunsetcorp. These clips were later assembled for the album Chuck Person's Eccojams Vol. 1 (2010). Stereogum's Miles Bowe summarized vaporwave as a combination of "the chopped and screwed plunderphonics of Dan Lopatin ... with the nihilistic easy-listening of James Ferraro’s Muzak-hellscapes on [the 2011 album] Far Side Virtual". (Note: Another artist considered by some to be a hypnagogic precursor to vaporwave is 18 Carat Affair.)

Writers, fans, and artists struggled to differentiate between hypnagogic pop, chillwave, and vaporwave. The term "vaporwave" is generally attributed to an October 2011 blog post that discussed the hypnagogic album Surfs Pure Hearts by Girlhood. Adam Harper surmised that the author cited the work as "vaporwave" instead of "hypnagogic pop" possibly because they were unfamiliar with the latter term. He jokingly remarked of "a special place in hell" for those who attempt to separate the three genres: "it's a back room where Satan forever explains the differences between death metal, black metal and doom metal."

According to Harper, vaporwave and hypnagogic pop share an affinity for "trash music", both are "dreamy" and "chirpy", and both "manipulate their material to defamiliarise it and give it a sense of the uncanny, such as slowing it down and/or lowering the pitch, making it, as the term goes, ‘screwed’." Of differences, vaporwave does not typically engage in long tracks, lo-fi productions, or non-sampled material, and it draws more from the early 1990s than it does the 1970s and 1980s. Vaporwave has a stronger musical connection to chillwave than to hypnagogic pop for its sampling of slowed-down synth funk.

=== Impact and criticism ===
David Keenan's original Wire article incited a slew of hate mail that derided the "hypnagogic pop" label as the "worst genre created by a journalist". As the movement's popularity grew, the analogue lo-fi aspirations of Pink and Ferraro were taken up by "groups with names like Tape Deck Mountain, Memory Tapes, Memory Cassette – and turned into cliché." Both chillwave and vaporwave had been conceived as tongue-in-cheek, hyperbolic responses to such trends. Writer Emilie Friedlander stated that the message board "Terminal Boredom" was where the debate on Keenan's article began.

Keenan became disenchanted with artists of the movement who streamlined their sound and "chillwave" came to serve as a pejorative for such acts. In the 2010 Rewind issue of The Wire, Keenan said that h-pop had "migrated from a process designed to liberate desire from marketing formulas to a carrot in the mouth of a corpse that has proved irresistible to underground musicians looking for an easy route to mainstream acceptance." (Note: In particular, he criticized Best Coast for leaving behind Pocahaunted to start a "simplistically twee-pop group that seems to exist solely to dance to whatever tune her current corporate sponsors – Converse, Target, Eskuche – care to call".) He invoked chillwave as "one of the more meaningless sobriquets applied to the new future pop visions" and "a much more appropriate description of the mindless, depoliticised embracing of mainstream values that H-pop has come to be associated with."

Some of the tagged artists, such as Neon Indian and Toro y Moi, rejected the h-pop tag or denied that such a unified style exists. (Note: Daniel Lopatin said: "I don't think the hpop tag is representative of a movement or constituted by a select group of artists. I see it more as a discussion about nostalgia and its subliminal effects on culture. I don't see anything wrong with the tag—it's just a way of engaging with a phenomenon." Ariel Pink similarly found such tags to be simply a means of framing artists in an interesting way. John Maus rejected the "hypnagogic pop" tag, as he did not intend his music to evoke 1980s nostalgia. James Ferraro was uncertain whether he belonged under the h-pop umbrella and believed that the genre was "not really an influence on me".) The Guardian's Dorian Lynskey called the hypnagogic tag "pretentious", while New York Times writer Jon Pareles criticized the style as "annoyingly noncommittal music". The latter described a showcase of such bands at the 2010 South by Southwest festival as "a hedged, hipster imitation of the pop they're not brash enough to make". Altered Zones contributor Emilie Friedlander prophesied in 2011 that Ariel Pink, John Maus, James Ferraro, Charles Free, Spencer Clark, and R. Stevie Moore would be remembered as musicians who "elevated the crackle and grain of low-fidelity recording ... and made the vocabulary of pop music and the preoccupations of the avant-garde seem a lot less incompatible than much of the previous century had implied." However, like Keenan, she later wrote of her disenchantment with the movement, after hearing Ferraro's Far Side Virtual's "reclamation of the laptop" which made her "realise how out-of-hand the whole lo-fi conceit had become". (Note: Writing for a 2019 retrospective on chillwave, Friedlander expressed that Keenan "wasn't wrong in thinking that lo-fi music was becoming a piece with the industry to which it once represented an alternative". She followed in his disillusionment after the release of Far Side Virtual, "a half-joking reclamation of the laptop that ... made me realise how out-of-hand the whole lo-fi conceit had become.") Weeks after the album's release, Altered Zones shut down. (Note: The announcement came on November 30, 2011, the same day the website published an artist feature on Ferraro.) OESB also went defunct the same year.

Hypnagogic pop's "imagined sonic past" has sublimated into various pop culture zeitgeists. Likewise, an affinity for the retro proved itself as a hallmark of 2010s youth culture. In a 2012 interview, Pink acknowledged that he was aware that he "was doing something that sounded like the trace of a memory you can't place" and argued that such evocations had become so ingrained into modern music that "people take it for granted".

=== Cultural interpretations ===
Simon Reynolds described hypnagogic pop as a "21st-century update of psychedelia" in which "lost innocence has been contaminated by pop culture" and hyper-reality. He notes a particular concern with the "scrambling of pop time", suggesting that "perhaps the secret idea buried inside hypnagogic pop is that the '80s never ended. That we're still living there, subject to that decade's endless end of History." Guesdon and Le Guern posit that "the hypnagogic movement can be seen as an aesthetic response to the growing feeling that time is speeding up: a feeling that often proves to be one of the fundamental components of advanced modernity."

On September 28, 2009, Writer Emilie Frielander would post an article in response to David Keenan's Childhood's End article on hypnagogic pop, stating: "So is hypnagogic pop political, in the sense of engaging in some way in the fight against capitalism and capitalist culture? Or does it signify a kind of dying gasp on the part of experimental music, a becoming-consensual of a noise now ready to throw down its hands and to concede that–at the end of the day–people just want to listen to Fleetwood Mac? My personal belief is that, sure, this new music may be somewhat 'nostalgic' or 'reactionary' in its return to outmoded recording technologies and the pop cultural idioms we grew up with as kids. But in this movement backwards I think there is the implicit recognition that these tropes actually form the fabric of our musical consciousness, and that they present building blocks for us to use as we move forward and try to create art that is true to our experience as members of the Y generation: coming of age with a remote control in one hand and an Ipod in the other, listening to our parents tell us that every good song in the universe has already been written".

Adam Trainer suggested that the style allowed artists to engage with the products of media-saturated capitalist consumer culture in a way that focuses on affect rather than irony or cynicism. Adam Harper noted among hypnagogic pop artists a tendency "to turn trash, something shallow and determinedly throwaway, into something sacred or mystical" and to "manipulate their material to defamiliarise it and give it a sense of the uncanny."

Writer Eldritch Priest stated in 2013, that hypnagogic pop and hauntology were "manifest examples of how music expresses a cultural lull. Both styles refer chiefly to a retro-electronic music steeped in a sensibility for the fictional, or (keeping with the apparitional signifiers) the spectral nature of nostalgia. Specifically, groups like Mordant Music and Pocahaunted mine the past for sounds that act the way Fredric Jameson suggests signifiers in a postmodern age do: they serve as codes for the affections of an era’s style that can be 'cannibalized' and made into 'a field of stylistic and discursive heterogeneity without a norm'".

== Related terms ==
=== Crimson Wave ===
Crimson Wave is a music scene associated with female hypnagogic pop artists such as U.S. Girls, Zola Jesus, LA Vampires, and Cro Magnon. In 2008, Die Stasi’s XXperiments559 compilation album gathered several female musicians such as Buckets Of Bile, Cro Magnon and their solo projects Bird and Circuit Des Yeux, Luxury Prevention, U.S. Girls, Wolf Eyes-related projects and Zola Jesus. These artists became known as part of a shortlived scene known as the "Crimson Wave".

== See also ==
- Microgenre
- Blog rock

== Bibliography ==
- Reynolds, Simon (2011). Retromania: Pop Culture's Addiction to Its Own Past. Farrar, Straus and Giroux. ISBN 978-1-4299-6858-4.
- Trainer, Adam (2016). "From Hypnagogia to Distroid: Postironic Musical Renderings of Personal Memory". The Oxford Handbook of Music and Virtuality. Oxford University Press. ISBN 978-0-19-932128-5.
- Graham, Stephen (2016). Sounds of the Underground: A Cultural, Political and Aesthetic Mapping of Underground and Fringe Music. Ann Arbor, Michigan: University of Michigan Press. ISBN 978-0-472-11975-2.
- Priest, Eldritch (2013). Boring Formless Nonsense: Experimental Music and the Aesthetics of Failure. Bloomsbury Academic. ISBN 978-1441124753.
- Whiteley, Sheila; Rambarran, Shara (2016). The Oxford Handbook of Music and Virtuality. Oxford: Oxford University Press. ISBN 978-0-19-932128-5.
- Spiegel, Maximilian Georg (2012). Gender construction and American 'Free Folk' music(s). University of Vienna.
