= Stop Your Nonsense =

Studio album by Position Normal
- Released: 23 August 1999
- Genre: Sampledelia; hauntology; lo-fi; sound collage
- Length: 41:32
- Label: Mind Horizon Recordings
- Producer: Position Normal

Position Normal chronology
Stop Your Nonsense (1999)	Goodly Time (1999)

Stop Your Nonsense is the debut album by English musical duo Position Normal, released in August 1999 by Mind Horizon Recordings. The album is constructed primarily from samples and found sounds, often taken from unusual vintage sources such as second-hand children's records and answer machine cassettes, often purchased by member Chris Bailiff in jumble sales and charity shops, or inherited from his father. Bailiff's bandmate John Cushway also contributes instrumentation and vocals.

Released to critical acclaim, Stop Your Nonsense was praised for its distinctively whimsical and eccentric style, with writer Simon Reynolds later crediting the album for pioneering hauntology music. Position Normal later re-released the album themselves.

== Background and production ==
Position Normal emerged in London in the late 1990s, consisting of producer Chris Bailiff and vocalist/guitarist John Cushway, both are former art students. In the years prior to forming Position Normal, project leader Bailiff's first group Bugger Sod dissolved, and he faced mental issues such as public anxiety, and felt focusing on making music was a therapeutic activity. The duo's only release as Position Normal prior to Stop Your Nonsense was the twelve-inch single "Part of the Bugger Sod Empire" (1998). Bailiff aimed to create his own distinctive sound for Stop Your Nonsense, dispirited that other music was what he described as "sounds from people that wanted to be part of something as opposed to being themselves." Although not wishing to be part of musical trends, he later commented that the album "sonically suggests that I had absolutely no idea of what musical scenes were happening around me at the time."

For musical inspiration and for sourcing samples for Stop Your Nonsense, Bailiff went to charity shops and car boot sales purchasing the cheapest records he could afford "with beautiful artwork and photography/illustration". He listened to various sources, including electronic music, easy listening, bands like T. Rex, church bells, "old music radio stations", The World Service, radio interference and "fruit and vegetable markets". He later commented: "You never know where the next lovely sounds are going to come from and what style or from what era they will be. There is no way of knowing, before you hear it, how you are going to feel or react." Sources for samples on the album included spoken word albums, nursery rhyme records and documentary records collected by his father, who had developed Alzheimer's and was unable to continue collecting, leaving Bailiff to archive his own "history".

Featuring an image of a child revving a toy car on the album sleeve, Stop Your Nonsense was Position Normal's sole recording for Mind Horizon Recordings. Having been signed to the label by an A&R sole, the duo believed Mind Horizon to be a small independent label, but later discovered it was being funded by PolyGram, who Bailiff dismissed as egotists. He later commented: "When the bosses of Polygram found out that Position Normal was on their label they went ape shit. They spent the next five months trying to kick me out."

== Composition ==
"Much of Stop Your Nonsense is steeped in a mildly menacing anglo-Dadaist atmosphere that's redolent of the English comedy tradition of cracked whimsy: writer/performers like Spike Milligan, Ivor Cutler, Viv Stanshall, Reeves & Mortimer and Chris Morris. Other tracks bring to mind the cabinet of curiosities, Joseph Cornell's boxes of found objects and Kurt Schwitters's Merz collages and sculptural assemblages made of consumer detritus."

—Simon Reynolds, Retromania

Stop Your Nonsense is a fuzzy, sample-based lo-fi album, consisting mostly of short tracks. It is constructed entirely out of samples, aside from Cushway's sporadic vocals and ethereal guitar work. The samples, many of which are voices, are variably either sourced from or resemble unusual vintage items, such as spoken word albums, faded BetaMax videos, time-worn answer machine cassettes and old reel-to-reel tapes. The fragmented speech samples are turned into "melodious mosaics" according to writer Simon Reynolds, who wrote: "Position Normal music is woven almost entirely out of samples which have a musty quality redolent of things stowed away in attics and forgotten for decades. This is B-boy crate-digging adapted to the English landscape of jumble sales and Oxfam." According to Tom Ewing of Freaky Trigger, the album aims to "take a bit of background noise and move it up front, spend a track exploring it. More often than not this sound is human speech."

The recurrent sampled children's voices, cover picture and album title have led critics to describe Stop Your Nonsense as childlike in nature. Dominant throughout the album are sampled music taken from 1960s and 1970s children's albums and television series, material which makes heavy usage of horns, whistles and commonplace percussion. According to Ewing, the second half of the album is largely "a big dreamy suite of children’s voices babbling away between half-remembered TV themes and carefree sonic gurgles." According to Reynolds, a production trick used throughout is combining reverb and filtering to make sounds "glint like they've been irradiated by a sudden shaft of sunlight pouring into a gloomy room." Despite being sample-based, the homemade quality of the album emphasises a feel of hand-made tape loops; the writer says "collage-wise, it's somewhere between Nurse with Wound and De La Soul's first album. Only Nonsense's stoned-to-say-the-least aura locates the album in the post-rave Nineties."

Critics compared the album's surreal, eccentric style to Dadaism and whimsical English comedians and humorists like Ivor Cutler, Viv Stanshall, Chris Morris, Spike Milligan and Reeves & Mortimer. In an interview with PopMatters, Reynolds reflected that the album's eccentric usage of odd samples and dreamy, Durutti Column-style guitar related to the whimsical, ethereal side of late 1970s post-punk that was absent in the more angular post-punk revival bands of the ensuing decade, comparing it to the unusual "bedsit" one-off singles of acts like Family Fodder and the Native Hipsters played by radio DJ John Peel. The album's usage of found sound, such as Cockney stallholders in a fruit and vegetable market or a phone message left by one Aunty Betty for her niece Doreen, drew comparison to the interludes on Saint Etienne's first two albums. The poetic speech on "Jimmy Had Jane" bears the influence of Dr. Seuss.

== Release and reception ==
Professional ratings
Review scores
Source	Rating
AllMusic	4/5 stars
Uncut	5/5 stars

Released on 23 August 1999 by Mind Horizon Recordings, Stop Your Nonsense drew the attention of several music critics who wrote gushing reviews. Andy Kellman of AllMusic named it an "Album Pick", saying "[t]he fact that the pied pipers behind Stop Your Nonsense are complete loons shouldn't hinder your ability to get lost in its juvenile buffoonery." He commented that the album's "gleeful regression" was an 'escape hatch' into "a rumpus room of fun house mirrors -- imagine adolescent versions of Prince Paul and Aphex Twin toying with a clunky My First Sampler." In a biography on Position Normal, he wrote the album's sound collages baffled Position Normal's small audience with "fun house-style deranged children's music and psychedelic dabs of guitar and odd percussion," resulting in a "British version of The Electric Company gone to hell."

Tom Ewing of Freaky Trigger felt that Position Normal achieved "the most difficult pop trick of all – making an album that sounds like nobody else but obeys an immediate internal logic." He further praised the 'glorious' attention to detail, considering the echoed instrumentation and "placidly catchy undersea melodies" to be Position Normal's signature sound, concluding that Stop Your Nonsense was the year's most original and "lovable" album. In a review for The Village Voice, Simon Reynolds positively commented that, due to the unusual sample sources, "Nonsense evokes the bygone crapness of Olde England--the provincial parochialism banished by the New Labour government's modernising policies and the twin attrition of Americanisation/Europeanisation. Some of the most magical tracks on the album aren't really music, but melodious mosaics of speech expertly tiled from disparate sources." He also reviewed the album for Uncut, writing that the sampledelic album was "the missing link between The Residents' Commercial Album and Saint Etienne's Foxbase Alpha." Bailiff later reflected on the album's reception in 2010:

"When Stop Your Nonsense came out when there was, as far as I am aware, nothing like it around. You can obviously categorise something when there is a lot of it about, or at least more than one, but at the time I felt that music lovers enjoyed it. It was about London history to them. It seemed to reflect how they felt about their own background. but then recently someone from Paris told me that it reminds them of growing up there which I thought was awesome."

Several music critics included Stop Your Nonsense on their lists of the best albums of 1999. Ewing wrote that Stop Your Nonsense was one of several British albums that year to owe "little to anything except themselves. Uncaring of commercial success, contemptuous of indie rock cool, concerned only with the noble task of creating their own words of sonic or songwriting logic. Reynolds named it his favourite album of 1999, later hailing Position Normal as pioneers of the hauntological genre. Bailiff was originally unaware of being hailed "the Godfather of Hauntology" by Reynolds, later commenting of the album's influence: "I suppose other people with their ears to the ground became aware of what I was doing and were influenced by it. It did feel a bit weird after what I suppose is so many years of other folks being influenced by my sounds and me not knowing anything about it." In an interview with Prog, actor Paul Putner praised the album, comparing it to Negativland and describing it as "[s]amples, cut-ups, weird easy listening… it’s got this heavy rock, Sabbath-type track played on recorders." Position Normal later re-released Stop Your Nonsense on their Bandcamp page.

== Track listing ==
All tracks written by Position Normal.

1. "Heavy" – 0:58
2. "The Blank" – 3:27
3. "Jimmy Had Jane" – 5:09
4. "Whoppeas" – 2:31
5. "German" – 2:19
6. "Drishnun" – 1:45
7. "Bucket Wipe" – 1:56
8. "Nostrils and Eyes" – 1:06
9. "Pepay Pepaymemimo" – 2:32
10. "Rabies" – 2:02
11. "Lightbulbs" – 1:36
12. "Hop Sa Sa" – 1:36
13. "Under Da Sea" – 1:59
14. "Only On Da Water" – 0:58
15. "Bedside Manners" – 11:52

== Personnel ==
- Position Normal – production
