= Post-noise =

Music genre and scene

- Other names: Post-noise psychedelia
- Stylistic origins: Noise; drone; lo-fi; progressive electronic; psychedelia; ambient; new age; tape music; kosmische Musik; DIY
- Cultural origins: 2000s
- Derivative forms: Hypnagogic pop; vaporwave; glo-fi; neo-kosmische; nu-new age; chillwave

Local scenes
- Post-noise underground

Other topics
- Crimson Wave; hauntology; harsh noise; blogspot; frippertronics; shoegaze; Italian occult psychedelia; Brooklyn noise

Post-noise is a 21st century music genre and scene related to hypnagogic pop, new-age and hauntology. The term was featured in writer David Keenan's 2009 article "Childhood's End" in issue 306 of British music magazine The Wire where he coined the term hypnagogic pop, describing it as a "questing post-Noise network that worships New Age music and uses half-remembered hits as portals to the subconscious". Music critic Simon Reynolds referred to "glo-fi" as a post-noise microgenre.

The style mostly propagated on the Internet, primarily through tape trading. Reynolds credited the Skaters, a group formed by James Ferraro and Spencer Clark in 2004, with catalyzing an "international post-noise network". Other associated artists included Oneohtrix Point Never, Pocahaunted, Laurel Halo, Sun Araw, Yellow Swans, Stellar Om Source, Dolphins into the Future, Xiphiidae and Emeralds. Ferraro released work through CD-R and cassette on his self-owned independent record labels New Age Tapes and Muscleworks Inc. Musical styles such as neo-kosmische, nu-new age, chillwave and vaporwave have been associated with the post-noise scene.

== Etymology and characteristics ==
In August 2009, writer David Keenan coined the term "hypnagogic pop" in the article "Childhood's End" in issue 306 of the British music magazine The Wire. He also used the terms "post-noise" and "post-noise underground". The blurb of the article described hypnagogic pop as a "questing post-Noise network that worships New Age music and uses half-remembered hits as portals to the subconscious". In the article, Keenan discussed artists such as James Ferraro, Spencer Clark, Ariel Pink, Ducktails, Pocahaunted, Zola Jesus, and Emeralds as hypnagogic pop acts. Keenan also noted the commonalities between hypnagogic pop and noise music, stating that "Like Noise before it, Hypnagogic pop fetishises the outmoded media of its infancy, releasing albums on cassette, celebrating the video era and obsessing over the reality-scrambling potential of photocopied art". In 2009, musician Daniel Lopatin described post-noise as a move away from "macho" noise music.

On 28 September 2009, writer Emilie Friedlander posted an article on hypnagogic pop, writing: "I commend Keenan a hundred times over for putting into words something that was on the tip of many a critical tongue over the past year but that no one had the guts articulate as something so sweeping as a cultural movement: the rise of a lo-fi post-noise psychedelia that moves past noise's rejection of consonance and sort of unconscious adherence to the 20th century high modernist ideal of autonomous art".

Although their aesthetic sensibilities diverge in many ways, this kind of composition shares with Hauntology and Hypnagogic Pop a kind of sadness or melancholy and a desire to construct an alternative reality by abstracting the affects from expressions past and showering the listener with their unclosed charm. Turning attention away from the historical depths in which a musical signifier is sunk, and scrambling the customary relationship between a work's formal object and aural symptoms, produces a strange, alluring apparition that "brings objects directly into play by invoking them as dark agents at work beneath those qualities [that express it]".

— Eldritch Priest (2013)

In Boring Formless Nonsense: Experimental Music and the Aesthetics of Failure (2013), author Eldritch Priest described "lo-fi post-noise psychedelia" as "often drone-heavy and noise-inclined, this music is characterized by a logic of deformation that aims to disfigure without obliterating samples, timbres, and impressions noticeably culled from a musical past that never was". Priest referred to what writer David Keenan labelled "wasteland 1980s cultural signifiers" to describe how "indulgence in these warped signifiers is what gives the music its spectral identity". Additionally, Priest stated that the style blends "outmoded media's high noise to signal ratio with an affected anti-virtuosity", and elaborated "Rather than sampling 1980s pop culture with contemporary technology, one can hear composers recycling the tropes of experimental art music from the 1950s and 1970s, tropes that Michael Nyman compiled and categorized as 'indeterminacy,' 'process,' 'ephemerality,' and the 'non-identity' of a work. But we can also hear the debt to conceptual art and free jazz that helped evolve experimental music in the 1970s into sound art, something that Hauntology and Hypnagogic Pop don't exhibit owing to the rock and dance background of their practitioners".

In Sounds of the Underground: A Cultural, Political and Aesthetic Mapping of Underground and Fringe Music (2016), author Stephen Graham defines post-noise as a wide subgenre of noise music which breaks apart noise music's orthodoxies, "inserting newer influences and references from popular culture alongside dyschronic affects [...] and subliminal modalities". It can even add "some commercial appeal". For Graham, post-noise encompasses hauntology and hypnagogic pop. Throughout the book, he uses the term "post-noise" to refer to artists such as James Ferraro, LA Vampires, the Advisory Circle, Fatima Al Qadiri, Daniel Lopatin, Broadcast, Sun Araw, and Moon Wiring Club. Additionally, Graham stated:

"Post-noise" refers to twenty-first-century music building off the viscous sounds, loose gestures, and anti-mainstream contexts of noise, while adding pop influences and even some commercial appeal [...] uses popular culture, from 1980s films and the proto-digital soundtracks of 1990s advertising to popular musical sounds themselves, as bedrock influences. But they aren't simply pop artists at the extremes; their work demands some kind of other home. These would be examples of horizontally overlapping fringe practices.

Post-noise artists were influenced by noise music, psychedelia, and new age, alongside German progressive electronic and kosmische musik artists such as Tangerine Dream, Klaus Schulze, Vangelis and Edgar Froese. In 2010, The Guardian published an article by music critic Simon Reynolds where he stated "post-noise microscenes like glo-fi" were maintaining "the tape trade tradition, releasing music in small-run editions as low as 30 copies and wrapping them in surreal photocopy-collage artwork".

== History ==
=== Origins ===
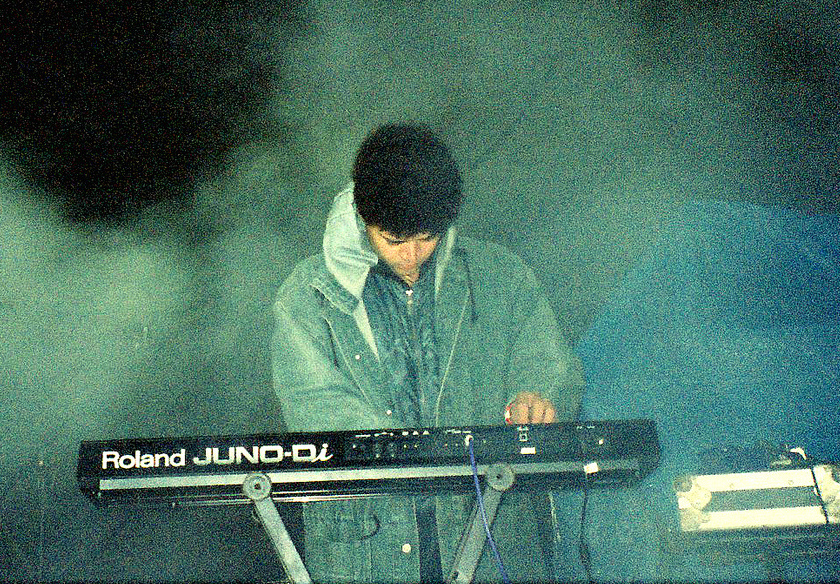
James Ferraro (pictured in 2012) and Spencer Clark's noise group the Skaters formed in 2004.

Writer Stephen Graham traced "the wide genre(s) of post-noise music" to a hybridization of the noise music scene which took place from the 1990s onwards. Coming from several noise scenes in the United States, artists James Ferraro and Spencer Clark formed the group the Skaters in 2004. After a year of recording, they began touring around the country. Graham referred to Ferraro as a "post-noise musician". Other acts associated with the post-noise scene included Oneohtrix Point Never, Pocahaunted, Dolphins into the Future, Sun Araw, Yellow Swans, Stellar Om Source, Xiphiidae, Laurel Halo, and Emeralds. Independent record labels such as California-based Not Not Fun proved influential.

The style primarily proliferated on the Internet, especially through cassette tape and CD-R sharing. Some artists also owned netlabels that published music coming from the scene, such as James Ferraro's New Age Tapes and Muscleworks Inc., along with Xiphiidae's Housecraft Recordings. Ferraro used New Age Tapes primarily for small-run releases of his own work on CD-R and cassette. Additionally, several writers have used terms such as "post-noise psychedelia", "post-noise underground", "lo-fi post-noise underground", "post-noise drone", "post-noise music", and "post-noise pop". Graham used the phrase "post-noise fringe pop", while writers Emilie Friedlander and Eldritch Priest used the phrase "lo-fi post-noise psychedelia".

In 2010, music critic Simon Reynolds referred to Lieven Martens as a "prominent figure in the international post-noise network catalysed by the Skaters". A close relationship existed between New Age Tapes and David Keenan and Heather Leigh Murray's Glasgow, Scotland-based record shop, distribution company, and record label Volcanic Tongue. The Volcanic Tongue shop enabled James Ferraro's UK and European audience to obtain physical copies of his music. The relationship between New Age Tapes and Volcanic Tongue was facilitated by the Internet.

==== Hypnagogic pop and new-age music ====
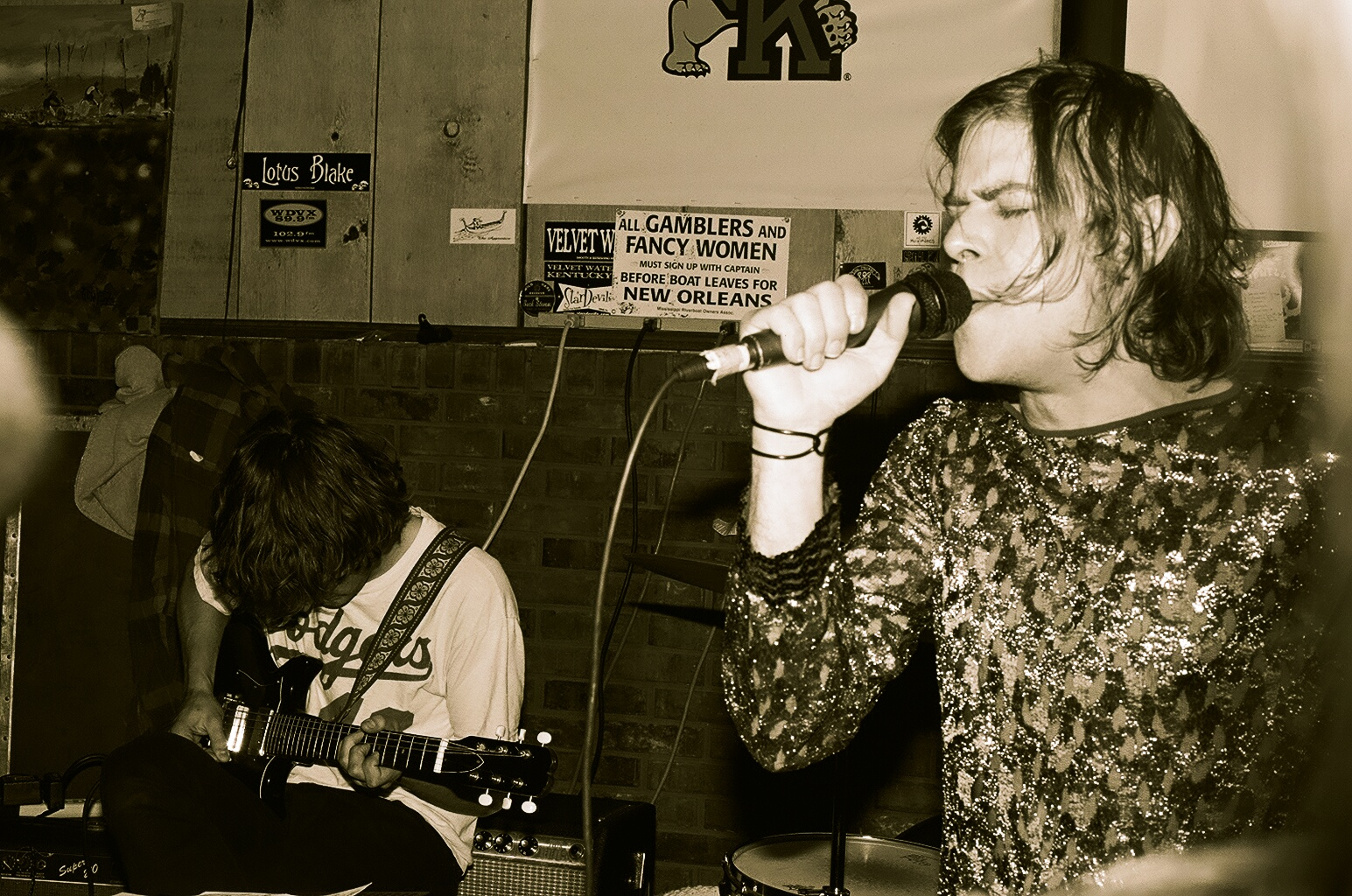
Ariel Pink performing in 2007

David Keenan's "Childhood's End" article from 2009 coined the term "hypnagogic pop" referring to "hypnagogia", the psychological state "between waking and sleeping, liminal zones where mis-hearings and hallucinations feed into the formation of dreams". Simon Reynolds credited a comment made by James Ferraro with inspiring the use of the term "hypnagogic". In December 2010, writer Ed Jupp acknowledged the article and a debate surrounding it in a review of Twin Shadow's Forget:

[...] the advent of artists like Neon Indian, Emeralds, and Ariel Pink's Haunted Graffiti (the latter labelmates of Twin Shadow) have started a seachange in thinking about 80s AOR, particularly when filtered through a post-noise and shoegazing filter. David Keenan wrote an article in The Wire last year that examined the concept and lead to a whole lot of discussion of whether the term is fair or not, and whether totally different bands are being shoehorned into the type of movement-making more commonly associated with the NME.

According to Keenan, hypnagogic pop "takes New Age at its word, as legitimate devotional music filtered through the particular ethos of the time". Keenan acknowledged that "it's vaguely serendipitous that the post-Noise underground would finally find its spiritual side in New Age music and 1980s pop culture", but argued that they allow for "true creative freedom". In Keenan's view, new-age music's "punk" simplicity makes it a "readymade DIY form of devotional process". Hypnagogic pop has been described as growing out of post-noise music or the post-noise underground.

In 2009, writing for Tiny Mix Tapes, writer Elliott Sharp reviewed the album Crowded Out Memory by Caboladies, stating that the group "navigate post-Skaters all-night pizza club and arcade terrains". He further added that he felt the album was one of the best representatives of hypnagogic pop, which was described as a "mysterious post-noise persuasion". That same year, The New Yorker highlighted "glo-fi", "chillwave" and "hypnagogic pop" as new terms, while citing the group Small Black as standing out as one of the "talented gems". The group were described as "warm nostalgic experiments in post-noise drone and shimmering pop".

==== Nu-new age and neo-kosmische ====
In 2016, Fact magazine published an article written by Adam Bychawski regarding an emerging revival of new-age music. Bychawski noted that by the end of the twentieth century, "listeners' appetite for the genre had waned", but it had an "afterlife" among some artists, including from the post-noise scene, "not long after [new-age] faded from public consciousness". These "post-noise converts" to new-age included Emeralds, Stellar Om Source, and Oneohtrix Point Never. The style has been referred to as "nu-new age". Other artists who have been associated with the style include James Ferraro and Dolphins into the Future. Independent record label Leaving Records was labelled a "bastion" of the movement.

Additionally, neo-kosmische emerged as a style of music used to refer to post-noise groups such as Emeralds, who "prompted a wave of millennial interest in kosmische Musik (Deuter, Klaus Schulze, Cluster et al)". The term was also used by Pitchfork to label Brooklyn band Titan. According to the Village Voice, around 2006, Lopatin stated that the Brooklyn noise scene began to discuss the work of Klaus Schulze. Initially Lopatin was considered an outcast in the scene for introducing "'70s cosmic trance music and '80s new age" into noise music. However, Emeralds and other acts felt a "boredom with noise, a sense we'd done it: We get this emotion".

In 2012, neo-kosmische was used as a term by British magazine Fact. That same year, Canadian magazine Exclaim! referred to Daniel Lopatin on the collaborative album Instrumental Tourist as "neo-kosmische noodling". By December, The Quietus published a review of Bee Mask's When We Were Eating Unripe Pears by Rory Gibb, where he associated the term "neo-kosmische" with post-noise, stating "Of all the neo-kosmische/post-noise explorers whose balmy currents have lapped at our shores over the past few years, Chris Madak is among the few who seem hellbent on mapping out genuinely new territory". Pitchfork stated that Lopatin "was at the vanguard of the American noise scene in the hazy years when it retreated from feedback-soaked harshness into an unkanny [sic] kosmische".

=== Vaporwave and development ===
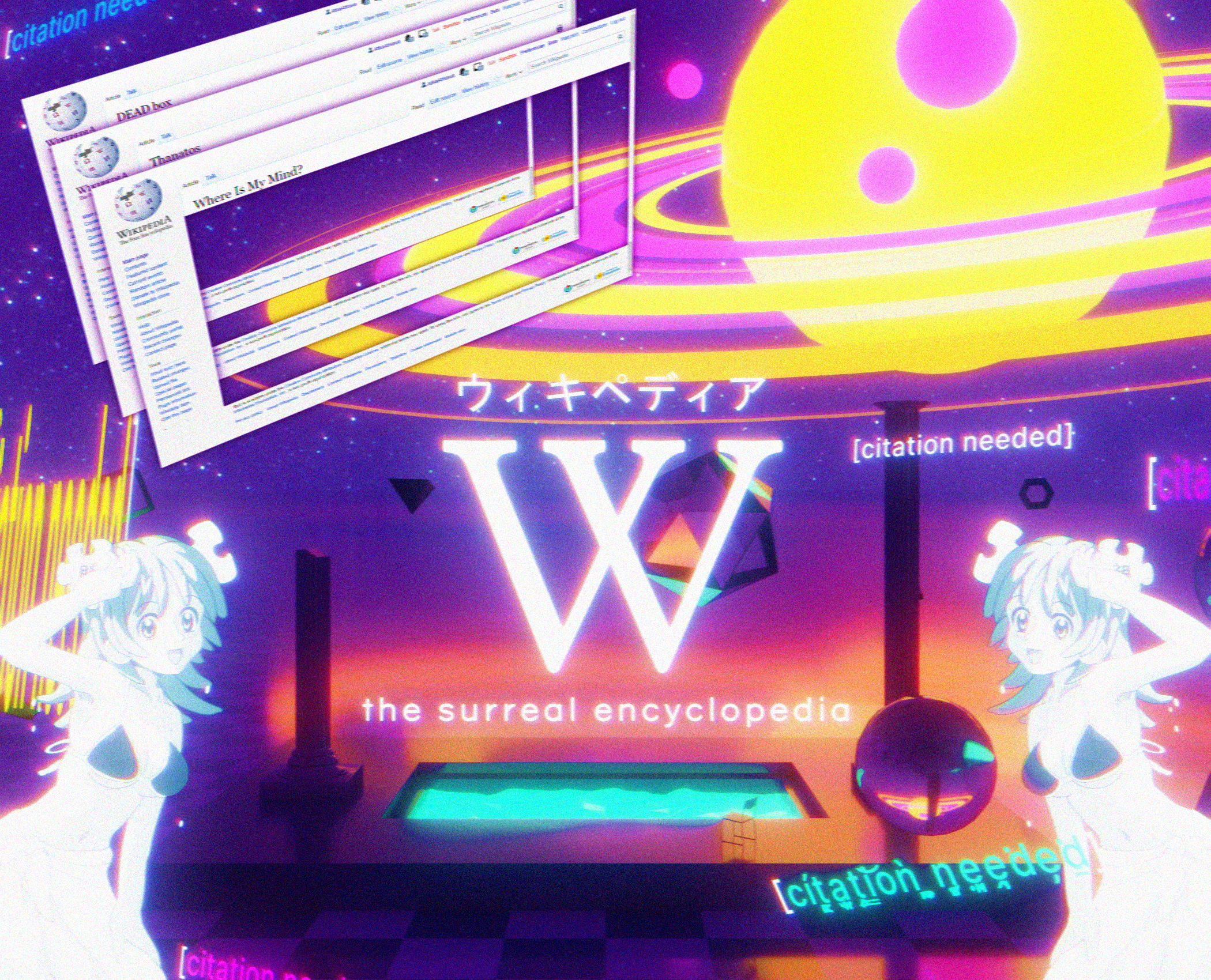
Vaporwave shared ties to 2000s lo-fi and post-noise music.

Oneohtrix Point Never (Daniel Lopatin) has been cited as emerging from the post-noise scene. In 2010, he released the album Chuck Person's Eccojams Vol. 1 under the pseudonym Chuck Person. The album coined a style of music known as "eccojams" which would later develop into the larger vaporwave microgenre and movement. That same year, Lopatin stated "I've got more in common with the American noise scene, to be honest".

Pitchfork stated in a retrospective review:

[Lopatin] Alongside artists like Emeralds, Yellow Swans, Skaters, and Carlos Giffoni, noise music was starting to sound less like Texas Chain Saw massacre and more like Tarkovsky's Stalker—and Lopatin was quietly training to become the house DJ for the "Zone".

On 15 September 2009, Keenan published an email interview with Lopatin titled This Beat Is Hypnagogic. In the interview, Lopatin drew a parallel between the relationship of post-noise and noise music and that of post-punk and punk rock, arguing that both involved a re-evaluation and expansion of styles he viewed as "stifling, didactic and kinda trad". He suggested that post-punk faced criticism from early punk scenes due to its associations with Black and queer cultures, and characterized first-generation punk as " just rockers with trashier aesthetix [sic] (punk rock-rock inertia undiluted)". Lopatin applied this framework to noise and post-noise, contrasting what he described as a "macho" strain of noise with post-noise practices that subverted it. While citing Spencer Longo's description of noise as a form of rock spectacle (referencing Hanatarash's use of a bulldozer and the slicing of a dead cat in half), Lopatin argued that post-noise represented a move away from masculinist conventions in the genre, stating "Goodbye macho sigs, goodbye noise for dudes only". He would also state that "Hpop operates as a function of pnoise [post-noise] and pop both – and deals acutely with nostalgia as a medium by which we generate present day variety. It's postmodern as fuck and its been happening for a long while now. Sonically, a new ageian pan flute preset with chorus function-ON presented as a method by which one might deliver a sublime no-mind drone situation works in a pnoise context".

In 2010, Lopatin stated in reference to the group Double Leopards, that "It was droning put into the context of extended jamming. But it was really un-macho – they used to sit down and play. We called it floorcore. It was super-reverby, gauzy and dark". At the time, Lopatin had coined the term "floorcore" to describe a previous group he was in and style of music he performed.

In 2011, Tiny Mix Tapes reviewed James Ferraro's album Inhale C-4 $$$$$ which was released as Benetune$. Writer Jonathan Dean highlighted audience perception of Ferraro's music from his early work through Far Side Virtual, stating that there was "a growing rank of malcontents who have greeted Ferraro's sudden leap from the lo-fi post-noise underground to lurid HD postmodernity with skepticism or contempt".

That same year, writing for Drowned in Sound in a review of Laurel Halo's album Hour Logic released on the independent record label Hippos in Tanks, Rory Gibb stated:

2011 was a year when the formless stews of US post-noise pop began to crystallise out into warped proto dance music. Not Not Fun's 100% Silk label put out a series of dancefloor 12"s with mixed results, Olde English Spelling Bee's Stellar OM Source has started making droney acid-flecked house – and Laurel Halo put out Hour Logic, a stunning six tracker that nodded equally towards eighties synth-pop, early Detroit techno and Oneohtrix-styled synthesiser music. But it was anything but retro – in the vocal-driven swoon of 'Constant Index', and the electric blue crackles of the title track, far more modern concerns were expressed: web age connectivity vs. bedroom-locked loneliness, the rapid-fire advance of modern technology, the utopian promises ushered in by the digital age.

On 4 December 2018, the Journal of Popular Music Studies published a research paper which stated that vaporwave shared "ties to the trends of 2000s lo-fi and post-noise music, such as 'hypnagogic pop'". In 2019, Nashville, Tennessee artist River Everett founded Retrac Recordings, a DIY label active between 2019 and 2026 which released and reissued "past, present, and future internet cult classics", described as ranging from "analog bliss to digital psychedelia", on cassette tape, CD and vinyl. Her ambient and new age project New Mexican Stargazers drew heavy inspiration from the work of James Ferraro and Spencer Clark. Her work under Bagel Fanclub, a musical duo between Everett and Caybee Calabash, has been characterized as spanning "post-noise pastiches and dense braindance".

== See also ==
- Crimson Wave (music)
- Harsh noise
- Minimal music
