= The Skaters (band) =

American experimental music duo

- Ferraro (right) and Clark, year unknown

Background information
- Also known as: The Temple Defectors (March 2008)
- Origin: California, U.S.
- Genres: Post-noise; drone
- Years active: 2004–2009
- Labels: New Age Tapes; Nature Tape Limb; Arbor Infinity; 267 lattajjaa; 23; Lal Lal Lal; Chocolate Monk; American; Sick Head; Catsup Plate; Wabana; Eclipse; Pacific City
- Past members: James Ferraro; Spencer Clark

The Skaters were an American experimental music duo based in San Diego and San Francisco, California, formed by James Ferraro and Spencer Clark. The group released cassettes, CD-Rs, and LPs of their work between 2004 and 2008 and toured the United States and Europe until 2009. They have been regarded as part of the "post-noise psychedelia" movement.

Music journalist Simon Reynolds described the Skaters, along with Ariel Pink, as the "godparents" of hypnagogic pop, and credited a comment made by Ferraro with inspiring the use of the term "hypnagogic". He had also credited the group with catalyzing an "international post-noise network".

== History ==
In 2004, Ferraro turned 18 and moved from New York to San Diego, where he would meet Clark at an "all-day improvisational noise jam". Later moving to San Francisco, the duo would record jam sessions in their apartment, which were described by SF Weekly in 2006 as "vocal-dominated psychedelia" and "noise-drenched cosmic soul". The cover artwork of these releases was typically low-quality, black and white collages.

== Discography ==
- Dark Rye Bread (2004)
- Humming Lattice Flowers (2004; with Yellow Swans)
- Mountain of Signs (2004)
- Rippling Whispers (2004)
- White Rye Bread (2004; remixes of the Beatles)
- Palm Shaper (November 2004)
- Axolotl / The Skaters (2005; with Axolotl)
- Crowned Purple Gowns (2005)
- Gambling in Ohpa's Shadow (2005)
- Pavilionous Miracles of Circular Facet Dice (2005)
- Receding Smokebath (2005)
- The Skaters / Wooden Wand / The Vanishing Voice (2005; with Wooden Wand and the Vanishing Voice)
- Live at KDVS 90.3 FM, Sacramento, CA 3-25-2005 (March 2005; with Axolotl and Mouthus)
- Untitled or The Skaters (August 2005)
- Diminishing Shrine Recycles (2006; VHS)
- Live Split (2006; with Tomutonttu)
- Shadow Watcher Levitations (2006; released under the aliases "Acid Eagle" (Ferraro) and "Vodka Soap" (Clark))
- Talking Head (2006)
- Raising Spheres of Crossing Angel Minds (April 2006)
- The Skaters / Axolotl (June 2006; with Axolotl)
- Dripping Avenues / Wind Drapeing Incense (December 2006)
- Dispersed Royalty Ornaments (May 2007)
- Monopoly Child Star Searchers / Angel Snake (2008; released under the aliases "Angel Snake" (Ferraro) and "Monopoly Child Star Searchers" (Clark))
- Wind Drapeing Incense (2008)
- The Temple Defectors / Claypipe (March 2008; with Claypipe, released under the alias "the Temple Defectors")
- Physicalities of the Sensibilities of Ingrediential Stairways (August 2008)
- Mountaineer Skyness of Majestic Planes (October 2008)
- Live at Spooky Action Palace (year unknown; with Axolotl, C. Spencer Yeh, and Lambsbread)

Note: Some Ferraro releases, such as Rerex 1–2 and Body Fusion 1–2, have been referred to by Ferraro as being a part of the Skaters' catalog.

== Bibliography ==
- Reynolds, Simon (July 19, 2011). Retromania: Pop Culture's Addiction to Its Own Past. New York City: Faber & Faber. ISBN 978-1-4299-6858-4.
- Whiteley, Sheila; Rambarran, Shara (2016). The Oxford Handbook of Music and Virtuality. Oxford: Oxford University Press. ISBN 978-0-19-932128-5.
