= Position Normal =

English musical duo

- Also known as: Buggersod
- Origin: London, England
- Genres: Sampledelia; collage; psychedelic pop
- Years active: 1986–present
- Labels: Mind Horizon Recordings, Rum
- Members: Chris Bailiff, John Cushway
- Website: https://www.positionnormal.com/

Position Normal are an English musical duo, formed in London in 1986, consisting of Chris Bailiff and John Cushway. Their music is sample-based, incorporating existing music and found sound from unusual vintage sources (purchased second hand or previously owned by Bailiff's father) into collage-like tracks.

== History ==
The two members began working together in 1986, using samplers and tape loops to fashion collagistic psychedelic pop. The duo originally worked as Buggersod, supplementing their music with video projections as well as "mashed potato flung into the audience and socks hanging from the ceiling," according to writer David Stubbs. Bailiff and Cushway's first release as Position Normal was the twelve-inch single "Part of the Bugger Sod Empire" (1998). In 1999, they released their debut album Stop Your Nonsense in Britain through Mind Horizon. The record combined samples from children's music with psychedelic guitar work and unusual percussion, and was critically acclaimed, later ranking on several critics' year-end best albums lists.

The band followed with Goodly Time (1999). In a review for Uncut, Stubbs credited the album with "uncover[ing] old cardboard boxes of stuff that, even in this supposed era of kitsch, have remained repressed and untouched." Following a decade-long hiatus, follow-up Position Normal was released in 2009, originally only on cassette, It was ranked as one of the best albums of 2009 by The Wire. The group also played rare live performances in London, including at the Exotic Pylon in 2010.

== Influence ==
The group were a primary influence on artists like Moon Wiring Club and The Focus Group. In his book Retromania, Simon Reynolds describes Position Normal as a progenitor of the 2000s hauntology genre, which is concerned with "lost futures" and abandoned cultural material. Writer Joseph Stannard, who helped popularise the term "hauntology", included Position Normal on a 2013 compilation album based on his Brighton club night The Outer Church.

== Discography ==
- Stop Your Nonsense (1999)
- Goodly Time (1999)
- Position Normal (2009)
