= Sampledelia =

Sample-based music genre

- Stylistic origins: Hip-hop; electronic; psychedelia; sound collage; turntablism; dub; musique concrète; art rock
- Cultural origins: Late 1960s–1980s
- Typical instruments: Sampler; audio editing software; digital audio workstation
- Derivative forms: Chopped and screwed; wonky

Other topics
- Plunderphonics; trip hop; post-rock; tape music

Sampledelia (also called sampledelica and sampledelic) is sample-based music that uses samplers or similar technology to expand upon the recording methods of 1960s psychedelia. Sampledelia features "disorienting, perception-warping" manipulations of audio samples or found sounds via techniques such as chopping, looping or stretching. Sampledelic techniques have been applied prominently in styles of electronic music and hip-hop, such as trip hop, jungle, post-rock, and plunderphonics.

== Characteristics ==
Sampledelia describes a variety of styles which involve the use of samplers to manipulate and play back appropriated sounds, often drawn from outside familiar contexts or from foreign sources. Common techniques include chopping, looping, or time-stretching, the use of found sounds, and a focus on timbre. Artists frequently join musical fragments from different sources and eras, emphasizing rhythm, noise, and repetition over conventional melodic and harmonic development. The 1990s also saw computer-based sampling develop, with sounds treated within the "virtual space" of the hard disk. Samples may be used for both their musical qualities and cultural associations.

According to critic Simon Reynolds, sampledelic music expands upon the recording methods of 1960s psychedelia, which saw artists abandon "naturalistic" recording practices in favor of using studio-based techniques and effects to create sounds that could not be achieved through live performance. Reynolds identifies two contrasting tendencies amongst sampledelic artists: postmodernist versus modernist, with the former viewing sampling as a form of collage and pop art referentiality, and the latter approaching it as an update of musique concrète's techniques of sonic manipulation and transformation. Theorist Kodwo Eshun has described sampledelia as a kind of mythology in which "sounds have detached themselves from sources [and] substitute themselves for the world," inducing an experience of "synthetic defamiliarisation."

== Origins ==
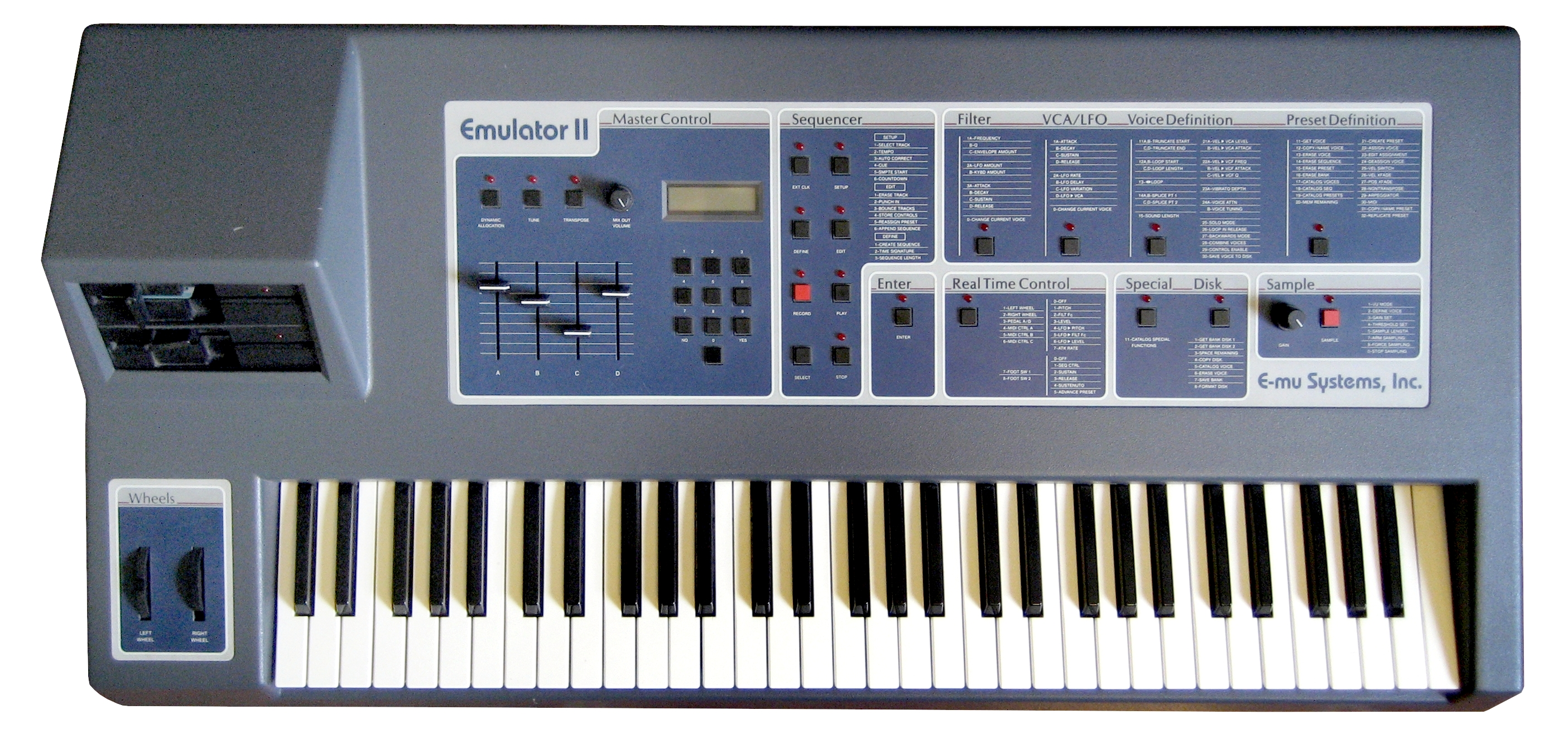
The E-mu Emulator II (1984) was an early, cheap digital sampler used by 1980s hip hop producers.

Early sampling practices date back to late-1960s turntablism and scratching in dance music, including Jamaican dub music scenes. Critic Simon Reynolds notes that early sampling techniques were used by art rock artists such as Brian Eno, Kate Bush and Peter Gabriel (the latter two via the expensive Fairlight CMI), with Eno and David Byrne's My Life in the Bush of Ghosts (1981) a landmark in the genre. However, he states that the beginning of the sampledelic era was marked by the acquisition of cheaper samplers such as the E-mu Emulator and Ensoniq Mirage by rap producers. In 1985, John Oswald coined the term "plunderphonics" to describe an approach which framed sampling as a "self-conscious practice" which interrogated notions of originality, identity, and "the death of the author."

Sampling was incorporated into hip hop's DJ- and studio-based approaches by artists such as Mantronix, Eric B & Rakim, and the Art of Noise, and by 1987 UK acts such as Coldcut, M/A/R/R/S, S'Express were creating breakbeat-driven sample collages blending the feel of hip hop and house. Late-1980s hip hop albums such as It Takes A Nation of Millions To Hold Us Back (1988) by Public Enemy, 3 Feet High & Rising (1989) by De La Soul, and Paul's Boutique (1989) by the Beastie Boys exemplified the sampledelic production style by appropriating sounds from varied sources to create "a dizzying, impressionistic whole that reminded some of the rock's ambitious psychedelic era of the late '60s" before copyright law made such an approach more difficult.

== Later developments ==
Early sample-based music often involved blatant interpolations of known music, prompting criticism and copyright concerns, but in the 1990s the style grew more subtle, with artists obscuring their sources in part to avoid legal repercussions. Artists such as A Guy Called Gerald, Techno Animal, and the Young Gods approached sampling with a more modernist outlook than Oswald. According to theorist Kodwo Eshun, sampledelic techniques were used by artists such as Tricky and RZA of Wu-Tang Clan and Gravediggaz. 1990s acts such as Position Normal and Saint Etienne would also take a sampledelic approach to explore forgotten elements of English culture. Albums such as Throbbing Pouch (1995) by Wagon Christ and Endtroducing..... (1996) by DJ Shadow are prominent 1990s works in the style.

Australian group the Avalanches extended DJ Shadow's sampledelic approach on their 2000 album Since I Left You. Pitchfork described the 2007 Panda Bear album Person Pitch as sitting "firmly in the sampledelic canon" alongside Since I Left You and Paul's Boutique. In the 21st century, genres such as chillwave pushed sampledelic music into new territory, incorporating retro styles such as yacht rock. West Coast hip-hop producer Madlib was described by Uncut as a master of the "lost art" of sampledelia, harkening back to an earlier era of hip-hop beatmaking.

== See also ==
- List of electronic music genres
