= Hauntology (music) =

Music genre and scene based on Jacques Derrida's neologism

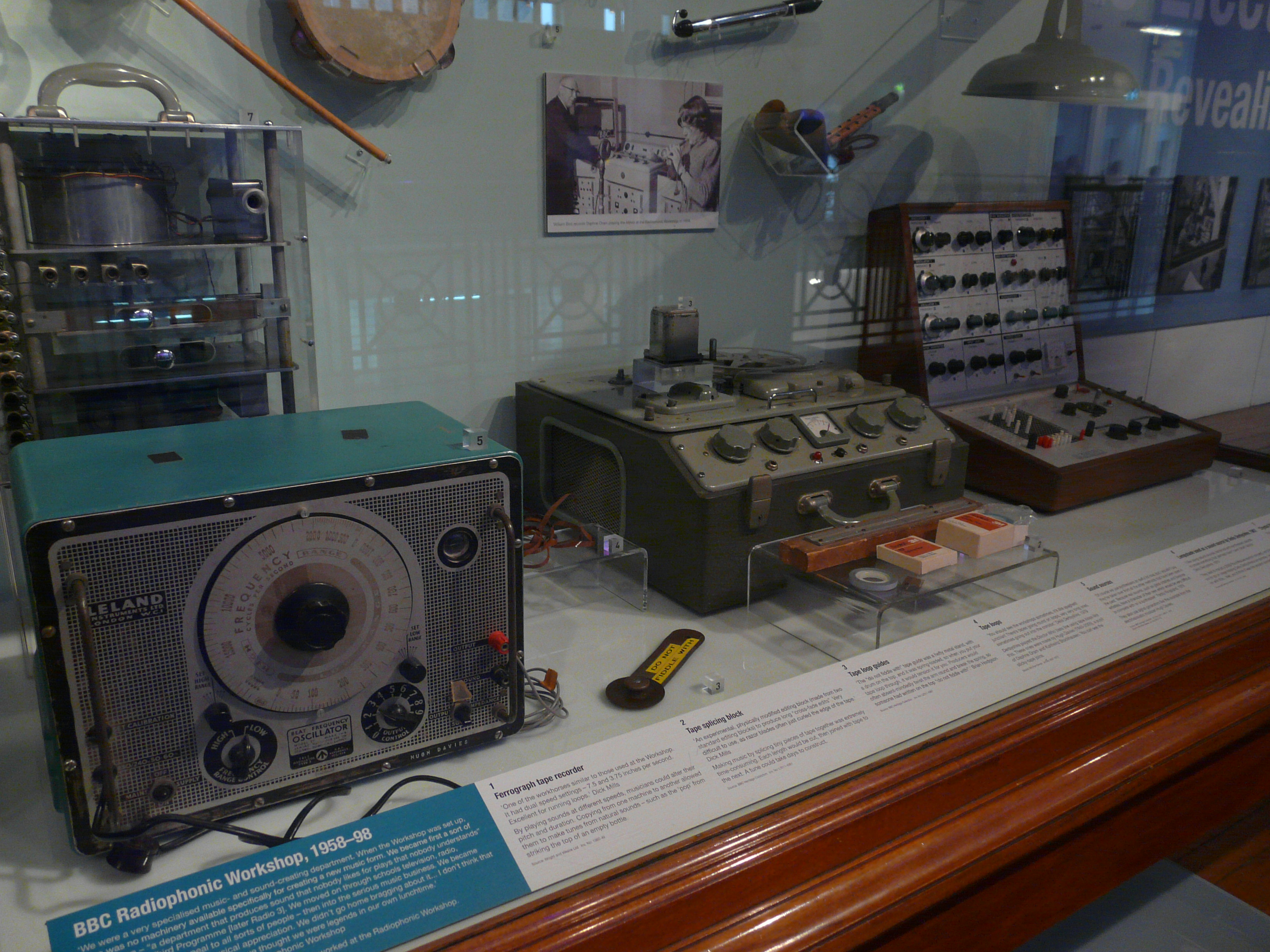
- Equipment used by the BBC Radiophonic Workshop, a common influence on hauntology artists
- Stylistic origins: Electronic; library music; film soundtracks; psychedelia; public information films; sound collage; plunderphonics; sampling; television idents; educational music; musique concrète; lo-fi
- Cultural origins: 2000s, United Kingdom
- Derivative forms: Hypnagogic pop; chillwave; Italian occult psychedelia; vaporwave

Other topics
- Post-Internet music; post-noise; glo-fi; neo-kosmische; bedroom pop

Hauntology is a music genre, movement or a loosely defined stylistic feature that evokes cultural memory and aesthetics of the past. It developed in the 2000s primarily among British electronic musicians, and typically draws on mid-century broadcast media, particularly British sources from the 1930s to the 1970s, including library music, film and TV soundtracks, psychedelia, and public information films; often through the use of sampling.

The term was derived from philosopher Jacques Derrida's concept of the same name. In the mid-2000s, it was adapted by theorists Simon Reynolds and Mark Fisher. Hauntology is associated with the UK record labels Ghost Box and Trunk Records, in addition to artists such as The Caretaker, Burial, and Philip Jeck.

== Etymology ==
The term hauntology was introduced by French philosopher Jacques Derrida in his 1993 book Specters of Marx as a term for the post-Marxist understanding of what is perceived as the tendency of Karl Marx's ideas to "haunt Western society from beyond the grave". The word functions in Derrida's native French as a deliberate near-homophone to "ontology", the philosophical study of being (cf. "hantologie", [ɑ̃tɔlɔʒi] and "ontologie", [ɔ̃tɔlɔʒi]).

== Characteristics ==
In music, hauntology is predominantly associated with a British electronic music trend but it can apply to any art concerned with the aesthetics of the past. The trend is often tied to notions of retrofuturism, whereby artists evoke the past by utilising the "spectral sounds of old music technology". The trend involves the sampling of older sound sources to evoke deep cultural memory. Critic Simon Reynolds stated in a 2006 article that "this strand of 'ghostified' music doesn't quite constitute a genre, a scene, or even a network. [...] more of a flavour or atmosphere than a style with boundaries", although in a 2017 article he summarized it as a "largely British genre of eerie electronics fixated on ideas of decaying memory and lost futures". A 2009 blog post by academic Adam Harper stated that "[h]auntology is not a genre of art or music, but an aesthetic effect, a way of reading and appreciating art".

Hauntological music draws on varied postwar cultural sources from the 1940s through the 1960s which lie outside the usual canon of popular music, including library music, film and television soundtracks, educational music, and the sonic experimentation of the BBC Radiophonic Workshop, as well as electronic and folk music sources. Other British influences include obscure musique concrète composers and Joe Meek's album I Hear a New World, as well as psychedelia and public information films. Also important is the appropriation of visual iconography from this earlier period, including graphic design elements of school textbooks, public information posters, and television idents.

Artists typically use vintage recording devices such as cassettes and synthesisers from the 1960s and 1980s. Production often foregrounds the grain of the recording, including vinyl noise and tape hiss derived from the degraded musical or spoken word samples commonly used. Sampling is used to "evoke 'dead presences'" which are transformed into "eerie sonic markers". Artists often mix antique synthesiser tones, acoustic instruments, and digital techniques, as well as found sounds, abstract noise, and industrial drones.

== History ==
=== 1990s–2000s ===
In music journalism, Derrida's ideas were invoked by critic Ian Penman for his 1995 essay on the production style of Tricky's album Maxinquaye, though Penman did not use the phrase "hauntology." In the mid-2000s, the word began to be more widely appropriated by writers and theorists such as Simon Reynolds and Mark Fisher, who referred to the work of Philip Jeck, William Basinski, Burial, The Caretaker, plunderphonics artist Loose On The Goose and artists associated with the UK label Ghost Box as hauntology. Fisher attributed this renewed discussion of hauntology to the emergence of lo-fi musician Ariel Pink in the mid-2000s. In a 2006 article for The Wire, Reynolds identified Ghost Box's the Focus Group, Belbury Poly, the Advisory Circle as prominent in the trend, along with Broadcast, The Caretaker, and Mordant Music.

Several elements of hauntology as a musical style were presaged by Scottish electronic duo Boards of Canada. Other progenitors include Portishead and I Monster. Reynolds also invoked sample-based group Position Normal as presaging the genre.

Music genres hypnagogic pop and chillwave – sometimes deployed interchangeably with each other – descended from hauntology. The former is described as an "American cousin" to hauntology. According to the Michigan Daily, the music microgenre vaporwave is considered hauntological due to its use of nostalgia.

== Critical analysis ==
Hauntological music is identified with British culture, and was described as an attempt to evoke "a nostalgia for a future that never came to pass, with a vision of a strange, alternate Britain, constituted from the reordered refuse of the postwar period" by The Oxford Handbook of Music and Virtuality. Simon Reynolds described it as an attempt to construct a "lost utopianism" rooted in visions of a benevolent post-welfare state. A sense of loss and bereavement is central to the phenomenon, according to theologian Johan Eddebo. Simon Reynolds in 2011, remarked:

There are those who say that hauntology's moment has passed... that a good five or six years after the genre-not-genre coalesced, its set of reference points and sonic tropes has been worn threadbare. [...] how can you call time on a genre so self-consciously untimely? "Consensus to Delete" a/k/a the debate at Wikipedia about whether or not to erase the entry on 'Hauntology (musical genre)'. In the end the shadowy cabal... decreed that Hauntology was too ontologically tenuous an entity to qualify for status as proper knowledge. It's the kind of Moebius pretzel of preposterous-yet-faintly-sinister discourse that could have inspired an entire monograph by Michel "Power/Knowledge" Foucault or Jacques "Archive Fever" Derrida. But look, look, how carefully and scrupulously they preserve ("do not modify") the record of their own deliberations.

Liam Sprod of 3:AM Magazine stated that "[h]auntology as aesthetics is firmly rooted in the idea of nostalgia as a disruption of time," adding that "[i]nstead of mere repetition, this distance provides a sense of loss and mourning, [...] and revitalizes the potential for a utopianism for the present age". Mark Fisher characterised the hauntology movement as "a sign that 'white' culture can no longer escape the temporal disjunctions that have been constitutive of the Afrodiasporic experience", calling it contemporary electronic music's "confrontation with a cultural impasse: the failure of the future". Fisher stated that

[W]hen cultural innovation has stalled and even gone backwards, [...] one function of hauntology is to keep insisting that there are futures beyond postmodernity's terminal time. When the present has given up on the future, we must listen for the relics of the future in the unactivated potentials of the past.

Hauntological music is stated by academic Sean Albiez to suggest "an uncanny mixture of shared but faded cultural memories with sinister undercurrents". Hauntology (along with the hypnagogic movement) was likened to "sonic fictions or intentional forgeries, creating half-baked memories of things that never were—approximating the imprecise nature of memory itself".

== See also ==
- Deconstruction
- Defamiliarization
- Nostalgia
- Post-noise
- Italian occult psychedelia
- Everywhere at the End of Time
