= Italian occult psychedelia =

Music genre

- Other names: Psichedelia occulta italiana
- Stylistic origins: Psychedelia; post-punk; progressive rock; hauntology
- Cultural origins: 2000s, Italy

Other topics
- Krautrock; occult rock; zeuhl; hypnagogic pop

Italian occult psychedelia (also known as psichedelia occulta italiana) is a subgenre of Italian psychedelic music defined as a form of hauntology, capturing the Italian collective memory of the soundtracks to cannibal movies, spaghetti westerns, and B horror movies. "Psichedelia occulta italiana" was coined by journalist Antonio Ciarletta in an article published by Italian music magazine Blow Up, in January 2012. A festival called Thalassa has occurred in Rome since 2013 to celebrate Italian occult psychedelia bands.

== Etymology and characteristics ==
The music form has emerged as a form of hauntology, an engine of reactivation of an Italian collective memory. The features of this shared past are related to the imagery of Italian genre films as cannibal movies, spaghetti westerns, Italian B horror movies and their soundtracks, and are related also to the violent, obscure and esoteric folklore so well outlined in the essays of Ernesto De Martino and in the documentaries of Luigi Di Gianni. "The darkness of human mind and the superstitions of old religions are leit-motifs that run through Giallo films and the music of IOP bands is hardly surprising: Italy is a country bound by belief and superstitions."

Other references are the stories and the characters of Federico Fellini and Pier Paolo Pasolini. Musically, Italian occult psychedelia is a cross of post-punk, psychedelic rock, Italian progressive rock, Italian library music and "Mediterranean vibes." According to Rumore, also other influences that "goes from Krautrock to Italian B-movie soundtracks, from drones to analog electronics, from lysergic folk to free jazz." According to Joseph Stannard, "It's equally clear that Italian occult psychedelia is far from sonically homogeneous." Simon Reynolds identifies italian occult psychedelia as an Italian counterpart to hauntology.
