= Specters of Marx =

1993 French-language book by Jacques Derrida

Specters of Marx: The State of the Debt, the Work of Mourning and the New International
- Cover of the first edition
- Author: Jacques Derrida
- Original title: Spectres de Marx: l'état de la dette, le travail du deuil et la nouvelle Internationale
- Translator: Peggy Kamuf
- Language: French
- Subject: Karl Marx
- Published: 1993 (Éditions Galilée, in French); 1994 (Routledge, in English)
- Publication place: France
- Media type: Print
- Pages: 198 (Routledge edition)
- ISBN: 0-415-91045-5

Specters of Marx: The State of the Debt, the Work of Mourning and the New International (French: Spectres de Marx: l'état de la dette, le travail du deuil et la nouvelle Internationale) is a 1993 book by the French philosopher Jacques Derrida. It was first presented as a series of lectures during "Whither Marxism?", a conference on the future of Marxism held at the University of California, Riverside in 1993. It is the source of the term hauntology.

== Summary ==
The title Spectres of Marx is an allusion to Karl Marx and Friedrich Engels' statement at the beginning of The Communist Manifesto that a "spectre [is] haunting Europe." For Derrida, the spirit of Marx is even more relevant since the fall of the Berlin Wall in 1989 and the demise of communism. With its death, the spectre of communism begins to make visits on the Earth. Derrida seeks to do the work of inheriting from Marx, that is, not communism, but of the philosophy of responsibility, and of Marx's spirit of radical critique.

Derrida first notes that, in the wake of the fall of communism, many in the west had become triumphalist, as is evidenced in the formation of a neoconservative grouping and the displacement of the left in third way political formations. He claims that at the intellectual level, it is apparent in Francis Fukuyama's proclamation of the end of ideology. Derrida commented on the reasons for that spectre of Marx:

For it must be cried out, at a time when some have the audacity to neo-evangelise in the name of the ideal of a liberal democracy that has finally realised itself as the ideal of human history: never have violence, inequality, exclusion, famine, and thus economic oppression affected as many human beings in the history of the earth and of humanity. Instead of singing the advent of the ideal of liberal democracy and of the capitalist market in the euphoria of the end of history, instead of celebrating the ‘end of ideologies’ and the end of the great emancipatory discourses, let us never neglect this obvious macroscopic fact, made up of innumerable singular sites of suffering: no degree of progress allows one to ignore that never before, in absolute figures, have so many men, women and children been subjugated, starved or exterminated on the earth.

Derrida went on, in his talks on this topic, to list 10 plagues of the capital or global system. And then to an account of the claim the creation of a new grouping of activism, called the "New International".

Derrida's ten plagues are:

1. Employment has undergone a change of kind, i.e. underemployment, and requires "another concept".
2. Deportation of immigrants. Reinforcement of territories in a world of supposed freedom of movement. As in, Fortress Europe and in the number of new walls and barriers being erected around the world, in effect multiplying the "fallen" Berlin Wall manifold.
3. Economic war. Both between countries and between international trade blocs: United States - Japan - Europe.
4. Contradictions of the free market. The undecidable conflicts between protectionism and free trade. The unstoppable flow of illegal drugs, arms, etc.
5. Foreign debt. In effect the basis for mass starvation and demoralisation for developing countries. Often the loans benefiting only a small elite, for luxury items, e.g., cars, air conditioning etc. but being paid back by poorer workers.
6. The arms trade. The inability to control to any meaningful extent trade within the biggest ‘black market’
7. Spread of nuclear weapons. The restriction of nuclear capacity can no longer be maintained by leading states since it is only knowledge and cannot be contained.
8. Inter-ethnic wars. The phantom of mythic national identities fueling tension in semi-developed countries.
9. Phantom-states within organised crime. In particular the non-democratic power gained by drug cartels.
10. International law and its institutions. The hypocrisy of such statutes in the face of unilateral aggression on the part of the economically dominant states. International law is mainly exercised against the weaker nations.

On the New International, Derrida has this to say:

The 'New International' is an untimely link, without status ... without coordination, without party, without country, without national community, without co-citizenship, without common belonging to a class. The name of New International is given here to what calls to the friendship of an alliance without institution among those who ... continue to be inspired by at least one of the spirits of Marx or of Marxism. It is a call for them to ally themselves, in a new, concrete and real way, even if this alliance no longer takes the form of a party or a workers' international, in the critique of the state of international law, the concepts of State and nation, and so forth: in order to renew this critique, and especially to radicalise it.

== Reception ==
Fredric Jameson, Werner Hamacher, Antonio Negri, Warren Montag, Rastko Mocnik, Terry Eagleton, Pierre Macherey, Tom Lewis, Aijaz Ahmad responded to Specters of Marx in Ghostly Demarcations, to which Derrida responded in Marx & Sons.

== See also ==
- Deconstruction
- Hauntology
- Hauntology (music)
- Post-Marxism
