= Joy Press =

American writer and editor (born 1966)

Joy Press (born 1966) is an American writer and editor. In the 1980s she was a music critic for American magazines and for the English weekly music paper Melody Maker. In 1996 she became the editor of the Village Voice literary supplement, VLS. Press later became the chief book critic and TV critic for the Village Voice. She edited the paper's 50th anniversary issue. By 2006 she was the culture editor for the Voice. Press worked for several years as culture editor for Salon.com before taking a job at The Los Angeles Times in 2010, where she worked as a TV editor and Books editor. She has contributed to the Village Voice, New York Times, and Slate.com. In 2003, the Association of Alternative Newsweeklies awarded her second place for Arts Criticism. Press has written extensively on the topic of gender. In 2018, Press published a book detailing the history of female showrunners, titled Stealing the Show: How Women Are Revolutionizing Television; the book received critical acclaim. Later in 2018, Press joined Vanity Fair as a television correspondent. She is married to the British rock critic Simon Reynolds.

== Books ==
- The Sex Revolts: Gender, Rebellion and Rock'N'Roll. Co-author Simon Reynolds. Serpent's Tail, January 1995, ISBN 1-85242-254-8
- War of the Words: 20 Years of Writing on Contemporary Literature in the VLS. Three Rivers Press, 2001, ISBN 0-609-80853-2
- Stealing the Show: How Women Are Revolutionizing Television. Faber & Faber, 2018, ISBN 0571342442
