= Toytown pop =

Music genre

Toytown Pop
- Stylistic origins: Pop; psychedelia
- Cultural origins: Mid-to late 1960s, United Kingdom

Other topics
- Psychedelic pop; bubblegum pop; sunshine pop; baroque pop

Toytown pop is a microgenre of pop music which emerged in the 1960s. It was most popular in the British singles charts between 1967 and 1974. The style is marked by the influence of LSD and psychedelia, as well as the work of authors such as Lewis Carroll, Edward Lear, C. S. Lewis, J. M. Barrie, Hilaire Belloc, Beatrix Potter, Charles Kingley, and Enid Blyton.

The genre contrasted with American artists who made music in response to the Vietnam War, which was not broadly the case in the United Kingdom.

== Characteristics ==
Toytown pop has been described as a microgenre and noted for appearing on the British singles chart between 1967 and 1974. According to writer Ian Rushbury of PopMatters, "If the band had a cute, lengthy name and the song had the word 'toy' in the title or was named after a missing chapter in The Wind in the Willows, it was a safe bet you were in the ballpark." Rushbury further stated that songs at the time about "drinking tea and eccentric shop owners" only seemed to appeal to the United Kingdom as opposed to the United States. In reference to toytown pop songs on Cherry Red Records' compilation album Climb Aboard My Roundabout!, he stated "All the appropriate components are in place – the jaunty rhythm section, the nursery rhyme lyrics, and the random fairground-inspired noises are all front and center."

Writer Michael Hann in an article of British magazine The Spectator stated that in the toytown pop genre, "musicians responded to LSD by opening their minds not to the possibilities of higher consciousness, but to nursery rhymes and doggerel. Or, as the Beatles did on the cover of Sgt. Pepper, by dressing themselves up as toy soldiers."

Hann remarked that the shortcomings of pretending to be children would have been "evident to musicians," though labels, producers and artists capitalized on the growing trend in British pop while groups who had previously performed rough British rhythm and blues switched to songs evoking "childlike whimsy".

== Background ==
The post-World War II generation of baby boomers which reached its teens and twenties during the 1960s widely grew up reading authors such as Lewis Carroll, Edward Lear, C. S. Lewis, J. M. Barrie, Hilaire Belloc, Beatrix Potter, Charles Kingley, and Enid Blyton. Lewis Carroll and Edward Lear were significant influences on late 1960s music, including on John Lennon of the Beatles and Syd Barrett of Pink Floyd.

Lewis Carroll's influence had been constant in Great Britain since his Alice's Adventures in Wonderland and Through the Looking Glass enjoyed a revival in popularity due to World War I. Once the hallucinogenic drug LSD became widespread, references to the books found their way into numerous songs. These included Jefferson Airplane's "White Rabbit," the Beatles' "I Am the Walrus," the Incredible String Band's "Alice Is a Long Time Gone" and "The Mad Hatter's Song," and many others. Songs could also take influence from the Alice books not by way of direct references, but through their "dreamtime ambience and the startling jump cuts and lurches in tempo."

Shortly before the dawn of English psychedelia, on 28 December 1966, Jonathan Miller's adaptation of Alice in Wonderland as a TV play was shown by the BBC. It had been in the planning for three years, and thus psychedelia was not an influence; nonetheless, "its hazy replications of the logic twists and warped perceptions of the LSD trip were unmistakable."

== History ==
At the height of psychedelia, an abundance of what Rob Chapman calls "nursery-rhyme pop songs" appeared. The trend was begun by the Beatles' "Yellow Submarine," released as a single on 5 August 1966. Writer Michael Hann in an article of British magazine The Spectator added that the Beatles' 1967 song "Lucy in the Sky with Diamonds" on Sgt. Pepper's Lonely Hearts Club Band was also responsible for the invention of the style. Hann remarked that several English bands drew inspiration from the song and "treated it as a manifesto".

The Beatles' Sgt. Pepper's Lonely Hearts Club Band, released on 26 May 1967, and Pink Floyd's The Piper at the Gates of Dawn, released on 4 August 1967, were highly influential to the course of British psychedelia, imbuing it with a character distinct from that of its American counterpart. While the music of American artists such as the Doors and Jefferson Airplane responded to the Vietnam war, this was not broadly the case in the United Kingdom. In the wake of Sgt. Pepper's Lonely Hearts Club Band, numerous English groups took influence from the Beatles' "Yellow Submarine" and "Lucy in the Sky With Diamonds," which responded to LSD with a retreat into "nursery rhymes and doggerel." This style of pop music became known to enthusiasts as toytown pop.

David Bowie's 1967 self-titled debut album was noted by David Wells as an example of the toytown pop sound. Wells cited the song "Uncle Arthur," as well as citing Bowie's blending of influences from Lou Reed and Anthony Newley.

Writer Michael Hann cited examples of the toytown pop trend with the Alan Bown Set changing their name to "The Alan Bown!" and recording an album that opened with the song "Toyland." In 1968, Status Quo released their album Picturesque Matchstickable Messages from the Status Quo with tracks such as "Sunny Cellophane Skies". Pirate radio DJ Kenny Everett produced the orchestral piece "And Now for a Little Train Number," with a psychedelic vocal about trainspotting at a Birmingham station. Marty Wilde would also release a toytown pop song moving passed his earlier rock and roll style to record "Zobo (1871–1892)," about a circus clown's life. Hann cites that many of these recordings have resurfaced online thanks to aficionados.

Other examples of toytown pop include Tomorrow's "Three Jolly Little Dwarves," World of Oz's "The Muffin Man," Cuppa T's "Miss Pinkerton," the Decision's "Constable Jones," and Consortium's "Colour Seargant Lillywhite."

Hann stated that toytown pop declined after a few years of the style emerging as "the serious musicians got the upperhand" through the popularity of progressive rock and concept albums.

== Legacy ==
In 2023, Cherry Red Records released the toytown pop compilation album Climb Aboard My Roundabout! The British Toytown Pop Sound 1967-1974.

== See also ==
- Nostalgia
- Psychedelic pop
- Bubblegum pop
- Sunshine pop
- Baroque pop
- Peacock revolution

== Bibliography ==
- Chapman, Rob (2015). Psychedelia and Other Colours. London: Faber & Faber Ltd. pp. 499–520. ISBN 978-0-57 1-28200-5.
- Rekret, Paul (2017). Down With Childhood: Pop Music and the Crisis of Innocence. London: Repeater. ISBN 978-1-910924-50-1.
