= Psychedelic pop =

Genre of pop music

- Other names: Acid pop
- Stylistic origins: Pop; psychedelia
- Cultural origins: Mid-1960s, United States and United Kingdom
- Derivative forms: Neo-psychedelia

Other topics
- List of artists; hypnagogic pop; toytown pop; psychedelic folk; psychedelic funk; psychedelic rock; psychedelic soul

Psychedelic pop (or acid pop) is a genre of pop music that contains musical characteristics associated with psychedelic music. Developing in the mid-to-late 1960s, elements included "trippy" features such as fuzz guitars, tape manipulation, backwards recording, sitars, and Beach Boys-style harmonies, wedded to melodic songs with tight song structures. The style lasted into the early 1970s. It has seen revivals in subsequent decades by neo-psychedelic artists.

== Characteristics ==
According to AllMusic, psychedelic pop was not too "freaky", but also not very "bubblegum" either. It appropriated the effects associated with straight psychedelic music, applying their innovations to concise pop songs. The music was occasionally confined to the studio, but there existed more organic exceptions whose psychedelia was bright and melodic. AllMusic adds: "What's [strange] is that some psychedelic pop is more interesting than average psychedelia, since it had weird, occasionally awkward blends of psychedelia and pop conventions – the Neon Philharmonic's 1969 album The Moth Confesses is a prime example of this."

== Notable works (1966–1969) ==
1966

- Pet Sounds by the Beach Boys – The album came as an indirect result of bandleader Brian Wilson's experimentation with psychedelic drugs. Music journalist Mike McPadden credits it with sparking a psychedelic pop revolution. He says that while psychedelic rock had existed before Pet Sounds, mainly among garage bands like the 13th Floor Elevators, Pet Sounds inspired mainstream pop acts to take part in the psychedelic culture. (Note: As albums that followed in the wake of Pet Sounds, McPadden cites Sgt. Pepper's Lonely Hearts Club Band (the Beatles, 1967), Triangle (the Beau Brummels, 1967), The Magic Garden (the 5th Dimension, 1967), Captain Sad and His Ship of Fools (the Cowsills, 1968), Head (the Monkees, 1968), The Turtles Present the Battle of the Bands (The Turtles, 1968), Odessa (The Bee Gees, 1969), The Genuine Imitation Life Gazette (The Four Seasons, 1969), Odessey and Oracle (The Zombies, 1969), and Intercourse (The Tokens, 1971).)
- Revolver by the Beatles – According to AllMusic, the album ensured that psychedelia emerged from its underground roots and presented in the mainstream as psychedelic pop. Biographer Ian MacDonald wrote that the album "had initiated a second pop revolution – one which, while galvanising their existing rivals and inspiring many new ones, left all of them far behind".
- "Good Vibrations" by the Beach Boys – Proclaimed by journalist Barney Hoskyns as the "ultimate psychedelic pop record" from Los Angeles in its time. Popmatters added: "Its influence on the ensuing psychedelic and progressive rock movements can't be overstated ... [it] changed the way a pop record could be made, the way a pop record could sound, and the lyrics a pop record could have."

1967

- "Penny Lane" and "Strawberry Fields Forever" by the Beatles – the double A-sided single is described by AllMusic as a prototype for psychedelic pop.
- Evolution was a transitional album between The Hollies' conventional pop sound and what the Oxford 'Encyclopedia of Popular Music' described as the "full-blown psychedelic glory of Butterfly."
- "Arnold Layne" and "See Emily Play" by Pink Floyd – Two singles written by Syd Barrett that helped set the pattern for pop-psychedelia in Britain.

1968

- Odessey and Oracle by the Zombies – AllMusic's Bruce Eder characterizes the album as "some of the most powerful psychedelic pop/rock ever heard out of England". According to Record Bin's Joshua Packard, the album was a "psychedelic pop spectacle". "Care of Cell 44", its opening track, "presents the band as bearers of a new kind of psychedelia, one that relied less on psychotropics and more on the natural abilities of the band. ... [the album] has gained a well-deserved reputation for being one of the greatest pop records of the '60s."

== Decline and revivals ==
By the end of the 1960s, psychedelic folk and rock were in retreat. Many surviving acts moved away from psychedelia into either more back-to-basics "roots rock", traditional-based, pastoral or whimsical folk, the wider experimentation of progressive rock, or riff-laden heavy rock. Psychedelic influences lasted a little longer in pop music, stretching into the early 1970s.

Psychedelic pop became a component of the neo-psychedelic style. There were occasional mainstream acts that dabbled in the genre, including Prince's mid-1980s work and some of Lenny Kravitz's 1990s output, but it has mainly been the domain of alternative and indie rock bands. Animal Collective saw commercial success in the 2000s; their 2009 album Merriweather Post Pavilion featured a reverb-heavy psychedelic pop sound that exerted a wide influence on music of the subsequent decade.

== Bibliography ==
- Bogdanov, Vladimir; Woodstra, Chris; Erlewine, Stephen Thomas, eds. (2002). All Music Guide to Rock: The Definitive Guide to Rock, Pop, and Soul. Backbeat Books. ISBN 978-0-87930-653-3.
- J. Kitts and B. Tolinski, eds, Guitar World Presents Pink Floyd (Milwaukee, WI: Hal Leonard, 2002), ISBN 0-634-03286-0, p. 6.
