= Sheila Whiteley =

- Born: Sheila Astrup; 2 February 1941; Brighton, Sussex, England
- Died: 6 June 2015 (aged 74)
- Education: Hove Grammar School; Open University (honors degree and Ph.D.)
- Occupation: Musicologist

Sheila Whiteley (née Astrup; 2 February 1941 – 6 June 2015) was an English musicologist known for studying popular music, such as progressive rock music and Britpop. In 1999, she was named professor and chair of popular music at the University of Salford, the first such position in Great Britain. From 1999 to 2001, she was the general secretary of the International Association for the Study of Popular Music. She held visiting professorships at the University of Aarhus in 2008, and at the University of Brighton from 2007 to 2009.

== Works ==
- Whiteley, Sheila (2006). Queering the Popular Pitch. Routledge. ISBN 0-415-97805-X.
