= Hauntology =

Return or persistence of past ideas

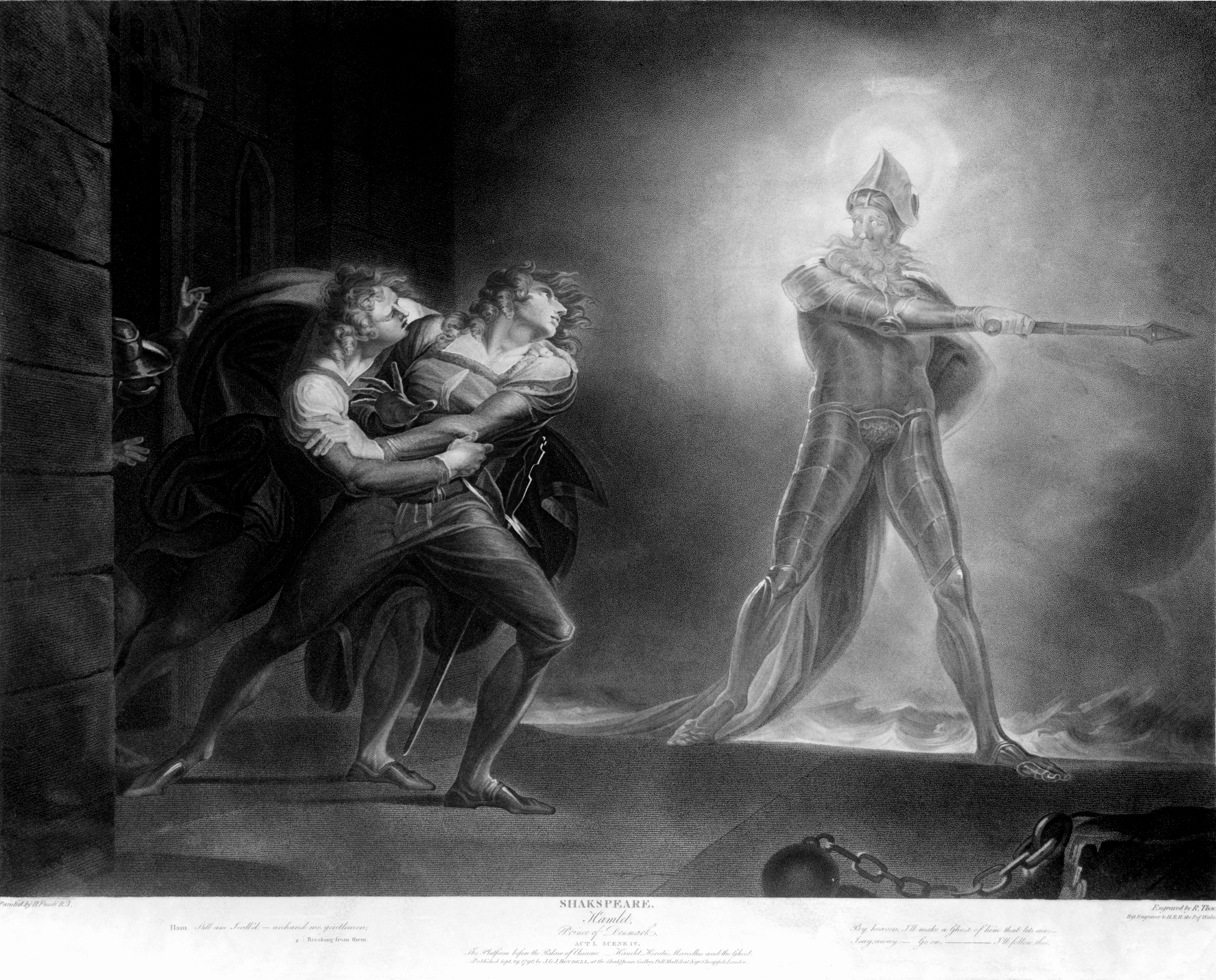
Hamlet, Prince of Denmark, Act I, Scene IV by Henry Fuseli (1789)

Hauntology (a portmanteau of haunting and ontology, also spectral studies, spectralities, or the spectral turn) is a range of ideas referring to the return or persistence of elements from the social or cultural past, as if to haunt the present. The term is a neologism first introduced by French philosopher Jacques Derrida in his 1993 book Spectres of Marx. It has since been invoked in fields such as visual arts, philosophy, electronic music, anthropology, criminology, politics, fiction, and literary criticism.

While Christine Brooke-Rose had previously punned "dehauntological" (on "deontological") in Amalgamemnon (1984), Derrida initially used "hauntology" for his idea of the atemporal nature of Marxism and its tendency to "haunt Western society from beyond the grave". It describes a situation of temporal and ontological disjunction in which presence, especially socially and culturally, is replaced by a deferred non-origin. The concept is derived from deconstruction, in which any attempt to locate the origin of identity or history must inevitably find itself dependent on an always-already existing set of linguistic conditions. Despite being the central focus of Spectres of Marx, the word hauntology appears only three times in the book, and there is little consistency in how other writers define the term.

In the 2000s, the term was applied to musicians by theorists Simon Reynolds and Mark Fisher, who were said to explore ideas related to temporal disjunction, retrofuturism, cultural memory, and the persistence of the past. Hauntology has been used as a critical lens in various forms of media and theory, including music, aesthetics, political theory, architecture, Africanfuturism, Afrofuturism, neo-futurism, metamodernism, anthropology, and psychoanalysis. Due to the difficulty in understanding the concept, there is little consistency in how other writers define the term.

== Development ==
=== Precursors ===
Hauntings and ghost stories have existed for millennia, and reached a heyday in the West during the 19th century. In cultural studies, Terry Castle (in The Apparitional Lesbian) and Anthony Vidler (in The Architectural Uncanny) predate Derrida.

=== Spectres of Marx ===
"Hauntology" originates from Derrida's discussion of Karl Marx in Spectres of Marx, specifically Marx's proclamation that "a spectre is haunting Europe—the spectre of communism" in The Communist Manifesto. Derrida calls on Shakespeare's Hamlet, particularly a phrase spoken by the titular character: "the time is out of joint". The word functions as a deliberate near-homophone to "ontology" in Derrida's native French (cf. "hantologie", [ɑ̃tɔlɔʒi] and "ontologie", [ɔ̃tɔlɔʒi]).

Derrida's prior work on deconstruction, on concepts of trace and différance in particular, serves as the foundation of his formulation of hauntology, fundamentally asserting that there is no temporal point of pure origin but only an "always-already absent present". Derrida sees hauntology as not only more powerful than ontology, but that "it would harbor within itself eschatology and teleology themselves". His writing in Spectres is marked by a preoccupation with the "death" of communism after the 1991 fall of the Soviet Union, in particular after theorists such as Francis Fukuyama asserted that capitalism had conclusively triumphed over other political-economic systems and reached the "end of history".

Despite being the central focus of Spectres of Marx, the word hauntology appears only three times in the book. Peter Buse and Andrew Scott, discussing Derrida's notion of hauntology, explain:

Ghosts arrive from the past and appear in the present. However, the ghost cannot be properly said to belong to the past .... Does then the 'historical' person who is identified with the ghost properly belong to the present? Surely not, as the idea of a return from death fractures all traditional conceptions of temporality. The temporality to which the ghost is subject is therefore paradoxical, at once they 'return' and make their apparitional debut [...] any attempt to isolate the origin of language will find its inaugural moment already dependent upon a system of linguistic differences that have been installed prior to the 'originary' moment (11).

=== In music ===
In the 2000s, the term was taken up by critics in reference to paradoxes found in postmodernity, particularly contemporary culture's persistent recycling of retro aesthetics and incapacity to escape old social forms. Writers such as Mark Fisher and Simon Reynolds used the term to describe a musical aesthetic preoccupied with this temporal disjunction and the nostalgia for "lost futures". So-called "hauntological" musicians are described as exploring ideas related to temporal disjunction, retrofuturism, cultural memory, and the persistence of the past.

== In anthropology ==
Anthropology has seen a widespread usage of hauntology as a methodology across ethnography, archaeology, and psychological anthropology. In 2019 Ethos, the journal of the Society for Psychological Anthropology dedicated a full issue to hauntology, titled Hauntology in Psychological Anthropology, and numerous books and journal articles have since appeared on the topic. In a book titled The Hauntology of Everyday Life, psychological anthropologist Sadeq Rahimi asserts, "the very experience of everyday life is built around a process that we can call hauntogenic, and whose major by-product is a steady stream of ghosts." In 2025, the journal Anthropological Theory Commons published a Special Collection on hauntology titled "Ghostly Lessons."

=== As method ===
Justin Armstrong, building on Derrida, proposes a "spectral ethnography" that "sees beyond the boundaries of actually spoken language and direct human contact to the interplay between space, place, objects, and temporality". Jeff Ferrell and Theo Kidynis, building on Armstrong, have developed further ideas of "ghost ethnography". Mara Dicenta, building on Gordon and Derrida, proposes "haunting as anti-method," one "that refuses to manage repression through interpretation" and allows for follow ghosts of violence without seeking resolution.

=== Primary and secondary hauntings ===
Anthropologists Martha and Bruce Lincoln make a distinction between primary hauntings, in which the haunted recognize the reality and autonomy of metaphysical entities in relatively uncritical, literal manner; and secondary hauntings, which identify "textual residues" history, or as tropes for "collective intrapsychic states" such as trauma and grief. As a case study, they use the example of Ba Chúc's secondary haunting, in which the state-controlled museums display the skulls of the dead and memorabilia, as opposed to traditional Vietnamese burial customs. This is contrasted with the "primary haunting" of Ba Chúc, the paranormal activity said to occur at an execution site marked by a tree.

Kit Bauserman notes that for literary and critical theorists, the ghost is "pure metaphor" and "a fictional vessel that co-opts their social agenda", whereas ethnographers and anthropologists "come the closest to engaging ghosts as beings". Some scholars have argued that the "neat distinction quickly breaks down in ethnographic analysis" and that "it is far from clear that the presence of ghosts as metaphysical entities is primary."

== See also ==
- Cultural memory
- Eternal return
- National memory
