= Found object (music) =

Classification of musical instruments

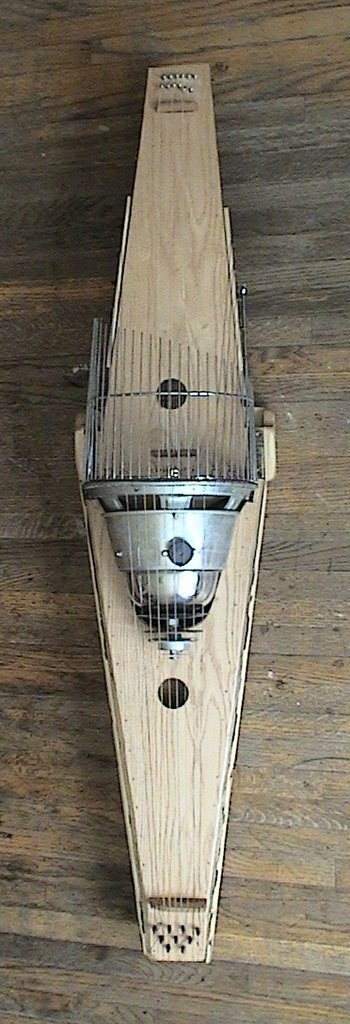
A "bowafridgeaphone" made by Iner Souster constructed from objects including refrigerator grates, a bundt cake pan and a metal salad bowl

Found objects are sometimes used in music, often to add unusual percussive elements to a work. Their use in such contexts is as old as music itself, as the original invention of musical instruments almost certainly developed from the sounds of natural objects rather than from any specifically designed instruments.

== Use in classical and experimental music ==
The use of found objects in modern classical music is often connected to experiments in indeterminacy and aleatoric music by such composers as John Cage and Karlheinz Stockhausen. However, it has reached its ascendancy in those areas of popular music as well, such as the ambient works of Brian Eno. In Eno's influential work, found objects are credited on many tracks. The ambient music movement which followed Eno's lead has also made use of such sounds, with notable exponents being performers such as Future Sound of London and Autechre, and natural sounds have also been incorporated into many pieces of new-age music. Also other builders like Yuri Landman, Harry Partch (for example his famous cloud chamber bowl instrument), Pierre Bastien, Iner Souster often incorporate found material in their works. Erik Satie's Parade is also an example of this unconventional type of compositional practice.

== Use in popular music ==
Einstürzende Neubauten became known for incorporating a wide range of found objects in their percussion gear. Shawn "Clown" Crahan, from the nu metal band Slipknot, beats a beer keg with a baseball bat to the beat of the song. The Dodos played a garbage bin as a part of their percussion gear. Wall of Voodoo drummer Joe Nanini would commonly use pots and pans instead of conventional drums.

The band Neptune uses VCR-casings, scrap metal and other found objects to create experimental musical instruments.

Found objects have occasionally been featured in very well-known pop songs: "You Still Believe In Me" from the Beach Boys' Pet Sounds features bicycle bells and horns as part of the orchestral arrangements.

=== Found sounds ===
The use of found objects in music takes one of two general forms: either objects are deliberately recorded, with their sound used directly or in processed form, or previous recordings are sampled for use as part of a work (the latter often being referred to simply as "found sound" or "sampling"). With the improvement and easy accessibility of sampling technology since the 1980s, this second method has flourished and is a major component of much modern popular music, particularly in such genres as hip-hop. Found sounds are also used significantly in certain areas of industrial music, especially metallic sounds that are the result of hitting or belabouring solid metal objects and surfaces.

== Examples ==
- Great Stalacpipe Organ
- Snake Oil Symphony - Daniel Steven Crafts

== See also ==
- Experimental musical instrument
- Found object
- Sampling (music)
- Sound collage
