= Simon Reynolds =

English music critic (born 1963)

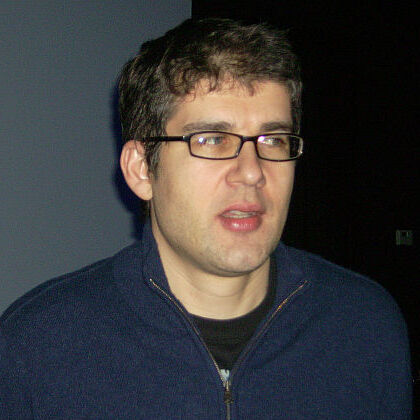
- Reynolds in 2011
- Born: 19 June 1963 (age 63); London, England
- Education: Brasenose College, Oxford
- Occupations: Music critic; author
- Spouse: Joy Press
- Writing career
- Period: 1986–present
- Website: blissout.blogspot.com

Simon Reynolds (born 19 June 1963) is an English music journalist and author who began his career at Melody Maker in the mid-1980s. He subsequently worked as a freelancer and published a number of books on music and popular culture.

Reynolds has contributed to Spin, Rolling Stone, The New York Times, The Village Voice, The Guardian, The Wire, Pitchfork and others.

== Biography ==
=== Early life and Blissed Out (1990) ===
Reynolds was born in London in 1963 and grew up in Berkhamsted. Inspired by his younger brother Tim, he became interested in rock and specifically punk in 1978. In the early 1980s, he attended Brasenose College at the University of Oxford. After graduating, in 1984 he co-founded the Oxford-based pop culture journal Monitor with his friends and future Melody Maker colleagues Paul Oldfield and David Stubbs along with Hilary Little and Chris Scott.

In 1986, Reynolds joined the staff of Melody Maker, where his writing was marked by enthusiasm for a wave of neo-psychedelic rock and hip hop artists that emerged in the mid-1980s (including A.R. Kane, My Bloody Valentine, Public Enemy, Throwing Muses and the Young Gods). During this period, Reynolds and his Melody Maker colleagues set themselves in opposition to what they characterized as the conservative humanism of the era's indie rock, soul, and pop music, as well as the unadventurous style and approach of most music criticism. Pieces from this late Eighties era would form the remixed collection Blissed Out: The Raptures of Rock, published in 1990.

=== Freelance and Energy Flash (1998) ===
In 1990, Reynolds left the staff of Melody Maker (although he would continue to contribute to the magazine until 1996) and became a freelance writer, splitting his time between London and New York. In the early 1990s, he became involved in rave culture and the electronic dance music scene, particularly that of the UK, and became a writer on the development of what he would later conceptualise as the "hardcore continuum" along with its surrounding culture such as pirate radio. Much of this writing was later published in Energy Flash: a Journey Through Rave Music and Dance Culture (1998), a history of the breakbeat, house, techno and later rave genres like jungle music and gabber. The book was published that same year in America in abridged form, with the title Generation Ecstasy: Into the World of Techno and Rave Culture.

During this time, he also coined the concept of "post-rock", using the term first in a Melody Maker 1993 feature about Insides and then in a more developed form in a May 1994 thinkpiece for The Wire and in a review of Bark Psychosis' album Hex, published in the March 1994 issue of Mojo magazine. In late 1994, Reynolds moved to the East Village in Manhattan. In 1995, with his wife, Joy Press, Reynolds co-authored The Sex Revolts: Gender, Rebellion and Rock 'n' Roll, a critical analysis of gender in rock. In 1998 Reynolds became a senior editor at Spin magazine in the US. In 1999, he returned to freelance work.

In 2013, a second expanded update of Energy Flash was published, with new material on the rise of dubstep to worldwide popularity and the EDM or Electronic Dance Music explosion in America.

=== Rip It Up and Start Again (2005) and Retromania (2011) ===
In 2005, Reynolds released Rip It Up and Start Again: Postpunk 1978–1984, a history of the post-punk era. In 2007, Reynolds published Bring the Noise: 20 Years of Writing about Hip Rock and Hip Hop in the UK, a collection of his writing themed around the relationship between white bohemian rock and black street music. In 2008, an updated edition of Energy Flash was published, with new chapters on the decade of dance music following the appearance of the first edition. In 2009, a companion volume to Rip It Up and Start Again was published, Totally Wired: Postpunk Interviews and Overviews, containing interview transcripts and new essays.

In 2011, Reynolds published Retromania: Pop Culture's Addiction to Its Own Past, a critical investigation into what he perceives as the current situation of chronic retrogression in pop music, with a focus on the effects of the internet and digital culture on music consumption and musical creativity.

=== Shock and Awe (2016) to present ===
Reynolds's eighth book, a history of the glam rock era, Shock and Awe: Glam Rock and Its Legacy, was published in October 2016.

In June 2026 White Rabbit Books released the publication of Still In A Dream: Shoegaze, Slackers And The Reinvention Of Rock, 1984–1994, a new book covering "the rise of shoegaze, slacker rock, grunge and dream pop", according to The Quietus.

In addition to writing books, Reynolds has continued freelancing for magazines, giving lectures, writing liner notes, and appearing in music documentaries. He resides in Los Angeles.

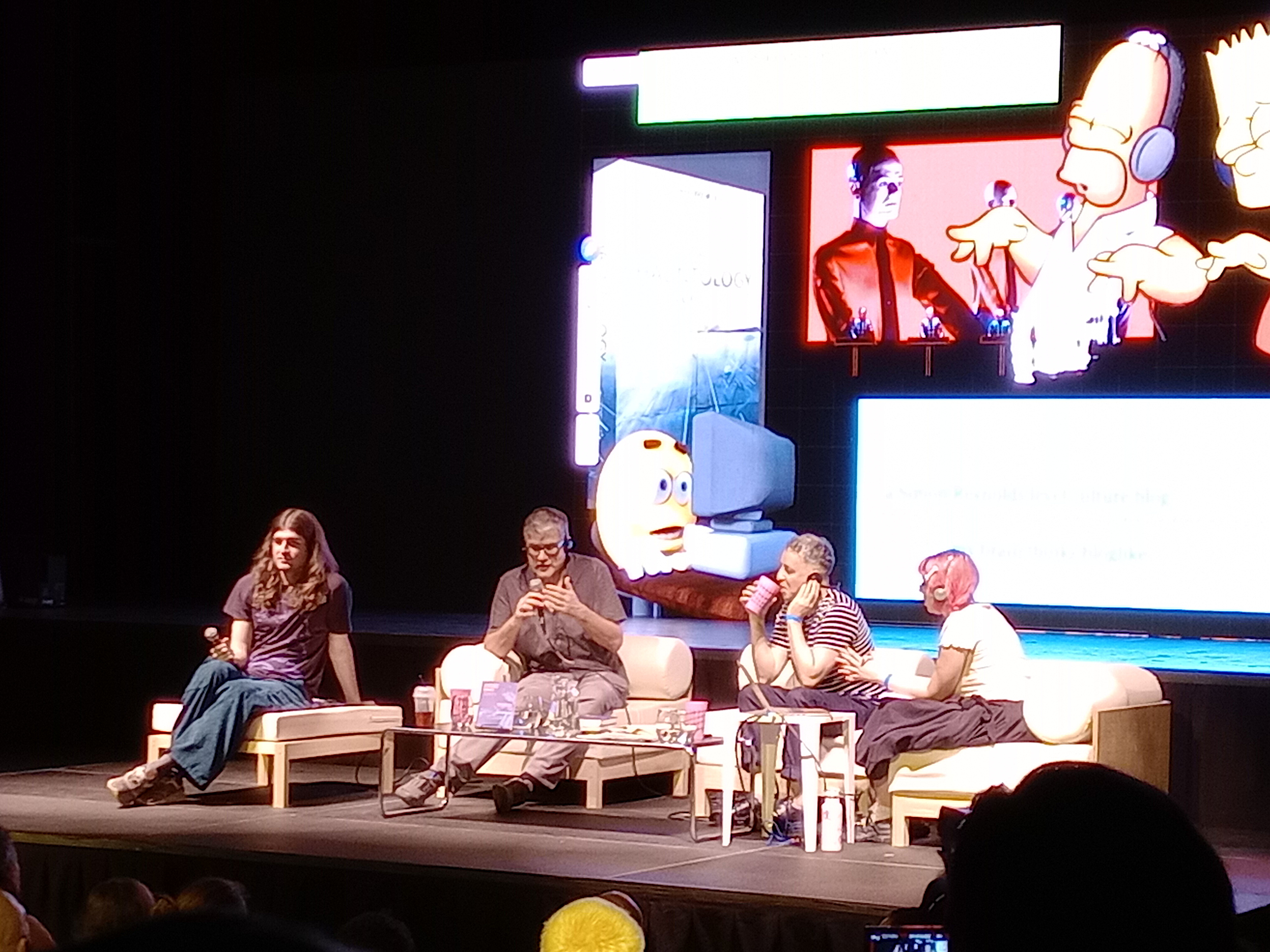
Simon Reynolds and his son Kieran (also a music critic) in a conference talk in Buenos Aires, 2025

== Critical style ==
Reynolds' writing has blended cultural criticism with music journalism. He has written extensively on gender, class, race, and sexuality in relation to music and culture. Early in his career, Reynolds often made use of critical theory and philosophy in his analysis of music, deriving particular influence from thinkers such as Roland Barthes, Georges Bataille, Julia Kristeva, Michel Foucault, and Gilles Deleuze and Félix Guattari. He has on occasion used the Marxist concepts of commodity fetishism and false consciousness to describe attitudes prevalent in hip hop music. In discussing the relationship between class and music, Reynolds coined the term liminal class, defined as the upper-working class and lower-middle-class, a group he credits with "a lot of music energy". Reynolds has also written about drug culture and its relationship to various musical developments and movements. In the 2000s, in tandem with fellow critic and blogger Mark Fisher, Reynolds made use of Jacques Derrida's concept of hauntology to describe a strain of music and popular art preoccupied with the disjointed temporality and "lost futures" of contemporary culture.

== Personal life ==
Reynolds is married to American writer Joy Press. Their child Kieran Press-Reynolds was born in 2000. Kieran is a music critic who has written for GQ, Pitchfork, and Dazed, and has been described as a digital culture reporter by Time magazine.

== Year-end critics' polls ==
Reynolds has voted in a number of year-end critics' polls, most often for The Wire's Rewind and for The Village Voice's Pazz & Jop. Since 2011, when The Wire renamed its year-end poll from Records of the Year to Releases of the Year, Reynolds has cast several votes for songs rather than album-length releases. Reynold's full voting ballots and year-end commentaries for a variety of magazines, going back to the late 1980s, can be found at Reynolds's Faves/Unfaves blog.

Year	Artist	Release	Source
1991	World of Twist	Quality Street	Reynolds's blog (ballot for The Wire)
1994	Tricky	"Aftermath"	Reynolds's blog (ballot for The Wire)
1995	Tricky	Maxinquaye	Reynolds's blog (ballot for The Wire)
1999	Position Normal	Stop Your Nonsense	Reynolds's blog (collecting writings from The Village Voice and Uncut)
2000	Isolée	Rest	The Wire
2001	Pulp	We Love Life	The Wire
2002	The Streets	Original Pirate Material	The Wire
2003	Dizzee Rascal	Boy in da Corner	The Wire
2004	Dizzee Rascal	Showtime	The Wire
2005	Ariel Pink's Haunted Graffiti	Worn Copy	The Wire
2006	Scritti Politti	White Bread Black Beer	The Wire
2007	Black Moth Super Rainbow	Dandelion Gum	The Wire
2008	Vampire Weekend	Vampire Weekend	The Wire and Pazz & Jop
2009	Tie: Micachu and the Shapes / Dirty Projectors	Jewellery / Bitte Orca	In Pazz & Jop, Reynolds allocated equal points to both albums. In The Wire, which does not allow tie votes, he voted for Jewellery only.
2010	Tie: Rangers / Ariel Pink's Haunted Graffiti	Suburban Tours / Before Today	In Pazz & Jop, Reynolds allocated equal points to both albums. In The Wire, he voted for Suburban Tours only.
2011	Metronomy	The English Riviera	Pazz & Jop
2012	Ariel Pink's Haunted Graffiti	Mature Themes	The Wire
2013	Sage the Gemini featuring Iamsu!	"Gas Pedal"	The Wire
2014	Tinashe featuring Schoolboy Q	"2 On"	The Wire
2015	Future	"Fuck Up Some Commas"	The Wire
2016	eMMplekz	Rook to TN34	The Wire
2017	Travis Scott	"Goosebumps"	The Wire
2018	Migos	Culture II	The Wire
2019	Baron Mordant	Mark of the Mould	The Wire

== Selected publications ==
=== Books ===
- Blissed Out: The Raptures of Rock. London: Serpent's Tail (Aug. 1990). ISBN 1852421991.
- The Sex Revolts: Gender, Rebellion and Rock 'N' Roll, with Joy Press. London: Serpent's Tail (Jan. 1995). ISBN 1852422548.
- Energy Flash: A Journey Through Rave Music and Dance Culture. United Kingdom: Palgrave Macmillan (2008). ISBN 978-0330454209.
  - Hardcover ed. (abridged). Generation Ecstasy: Into the World of Techno and Rave Culture. Boston: Little, Brown (1998). ISBN 0316741116.
  - Softcover ed.: London: Routledge (1999). ISBN 0415923735.
- Rip It Up and Start Again: Postpunk 1978–1984. London: Faber & Faber (Apr. 2005). ISBN 0571215696.
  - U.S. ed.: Penguin (Feb 2006). ISBN 0143036726. Full text.
- Bring The Noise: 20 Years of Writing About Hip Rock and Hip-Hop. London: Faber & Faber (May 2007). ISBN 978-0571232079.
- Totally Wired: Post-Punk Interviews and Overviews. London: Faber & Faber (Feb 2009). ISBN 978-0571235490.
  - U.S. ed.: Soft Skull Press (Sep 2010). ISBN 1593762860.
- Retromania: Pop Culture's Addiction to Its Own Past. London: Faber & Faber (Jun. 2011). ISBN 978-0571232086.
- Shock and Awe: Glam Rock and Its Legacy, from the Seventies to the Twenty-First Century. London: Faber & Faber (Oct. 2016). ISBN 978-0571301713.
- Futuromania: Electronic Dreams from Moroder to Migos. Minimum fax (Nov. 2020). ISBN 978-8833890920.
- Still In A Dream: Shoegaze, Slackers And The Reinvention Of Rock, 1984–1994. London: White Rabbit Books (Jun. 2026).

Book contributions

- "Ecstasy is a Science: Techno-romanticism." In: Stars Don't Stand Still in the Sky: Music and Myth. Edited by Karen Kelly and Evelyn McDonnell. New York University Press in collaboration with Dia Center for the Arts (1999). ISBN 0814747264.

== Music compilations ==
- Energy Flash (1998)
- Rip It Up and Start Again (2006)
