= For Love of Grace & the Hereafter =

Studio album by Iceage
- Released: 29 May 2026
- Recorded: November 2025
- Studio: Silence (Klippan)
- Genres: Indie rock; post-punk
- Length: 41:15
- Label: Mexican Summer
- Producers: Nis Bysted; Iceage

Iceage chronology
| Seek Shelter (2021) | For Love of Grace & the Hereafter (2026) |

Singles from For Love of Grace & the Hereafter
- 1. "Star" Released: 11 March 2026; 2. "Ember" Released: 7 April 2026; 3. "The Weak" Released: 6 May 2026

For Love of Grace & the Hereafter is the sixth studio album by the Danish rock band Iceage. It was released on 29 May 2026 through Mexican Summer. The album is the band's first studio album since Seek Shelter (2021) and was recorded in November 2025 at Silence Studio in rural Sweden, where Iceage had previously recorded Plowing Into the Field of Love (2014).

The album was promoted with the singles "Star", "Ember", and "The Weak". Critics described For Love of Grace & the Hereafter as a rawer and more immediate record than the band's preceding albums, while also discussing its melodic songwriting, romantic and religious imagery, and mixture of punk, post-punk, indie rock, folk-punk, and other rock styles. For Love of Grace & the Hereafter received positive reviews from critics and charted on Danish and UK specialty album charts.

== Background and recording ==
Iceage released their fifth studio album, Seek Shelter, in 2021. In the period between Iceage albums, the band's vocalist Elias Rønnenfelt released the solo albums Heavy Glory in 2024 and Speak Daggers in 2025. The first songs for For Love of Grace & the Hereafter began after the making of Heavy Glory, which Rønnenfelt said had given him an outlet for stripped-back songwriting before returning to more forceful material with Iceage.

For Love of Grace & the Hereafter was recorded in November 2025 at Silence Studio in rural Sweden, the same studio where the band recorded Plowing Into the Field of Love. The band lived above the studio during a week of recording, worked with a minimal setup, used few overdubs, and made many arrangement decisions live in the room. Rønnenfelt said in a press statement that the band wanted to remove unnecessary weight from the songs and capture quick-moving energy. The lyrics were written only a few weeks before the band entered the studio, a choice the band said was intended to keep the record urgent and less fragmented. Longtime collaborator Nis Bysted assisted with producing and mixing the album.

According to Pitchfork, the band returned to the Swedish countryside studio and recorded basic tracks in a week. Exclaim! similarly described the album as written and recorded over a week in a remote southern Sweden studio, with the songs shaped by the band members' improvisational impulses.

== Music and themes ==
For Love of Grace & the Hereafter is an indie rock and post-punk album. Pitchfork categorized it as rock and wrote that the album reframes Iceage's punk background through more melodic, pastoral, and romantic songwriting. Alexis Petridis of the Guardian wrote that the album adds shoegaze, country, and 1950s rock and roll to the band's indie-punk base, contrasting dark lyrics with more energetic music. Ross Horton of MusicOMH described the album as drawing on mid-2000s indie rock and indie sleaze, while comparing parts of the record to groups such as the Cure, the Strokes, and Vampire Weekend.

Several reviews discussed the album's relationship to earlier Iceage records. Zach Schonfeld wrote that the album follows the band's move from the raw punk of New Brigade and You're Nothing toward the broader arrangements of Plowing Into the Field of Love, Beyondless, and Seek Shelter. John Amen of Beats Per Minute described it as a return to more stripped-down instrumentation and mixes compared with the band's preceding albums.

Other critics focused on the album's tighter and more upbeat approach. Grant Sharples of Paste described it as unusually concise and rhythm-driven for the band, while writing that it revisits the energy of Iceage's early punk records through brighter melodies and more syncopated rhythms. David Saxum of Northern Transmissions wrote that the record was lighter and more upbeat than the band's recent releases, connecting its directness to the minimal recording process.

Reviewers also focused on the album's lyrics and themes. Myles Tiessen wrote for Exclaim! that the record brings together love, grace, annihilation, and religious imagery, especially in songs such as "Ember", "No Fear", and "True Blue". Schonfeld wrote that Rønnenfelt's lyrics treat romance as dangerous and catastrophic, with "Ember", "Star", and "No Fear" presenting love through images of darkness, violence, and religious feeling. Amen wrote that "Star" presents love as unresolved conflict rather than escape from it.

== Release and promotion ==
"Star" was released on 11 March 2026 as Iceage's first original song in five years. Iceage announced For Love of Grace & the Hereafter on 7 April 2026. The announcement came with a music video for "Ember", directed by the band and Ira Rønnenfelt. "Ember" was the album's second single. The Fader also wrote that "Ember" was the album opener and published the track list.

"The Weak" was released on 6 May 2026 as the third single from the album. The single followed "Ember" and "Star" and was released with a lyric video made by Alex Tults using video footage and still photographs by Anna Dobos and Ira Rønnenfelt. Stereogum described the song as rowdier than the album's first two singles, noting its drums, guitar riffs, and flute solo.

Mexican Summer released the album on 29 May 2026. Bandcamp listed digital, black vinyl, and CD editions, with downloads available in 24-bit/48 kHz audio. Mexican Summer also announced an artist-signed "Battered Sky" marbled-vinyl edition limited to 800 copies worldwide.

== Critical reception ==
Professional ratings
Aggregate scores
| Source | Rating |
|---|---|
| Metacritic | 87/100 |
Review scores
| Source | Rating |
| AllMusic | 4/5 stars |
| Beats Per Minute | 76% |
| Exclaim! | 8/10 |
| Louder Than War | 4.5/5 stars |
| MusicOMH | 5/5 stars |
| Northern Transmissions | 8.4/10 |
| Paste | B |

For Love of Grace & the Hereafter received a score of 87 out of 100 on Metacritic, based on 17 critic reviews, indicating "universal acclaim". Zach Schonfeld wrote in Pitchfork that the album works as a reset for Iceage by foregrounding sharper arrangements, direct feeling, and stronger melodic writing. Alexis Petridis wrote in the Guardian that the album continues the band's streak of varied, forceful albums and that its music offsets bleak lyrics with lively arrangements.

Myles Tiessen gave the album an 8 out of 10 in Exclaim!, calling it refined despite its fast development and emphasizing its religious and romantic themes. Ross Horton named it MusicOMH's album of the week and gave it five out of five stars, describing it as direct, hook-focused, and rooted in mid-2000s indie rock references. Writing for Beats Per Minute, John Amen gave the album a 76% rating and described it as a return to more stripped-down instrumentation and mixes compared with the band's preceding albums.

Grant Sharples gave the album a B in Paste, describing it as a return to early Iceage force filtered through the band's later songwriting experience. Nathan Whittle of Louder Than War gave the album four and a half out of five stars and wrote that its sixth-album reset may be the band's strongest record to that point. David Saxum gave the album an 8.4 out of 10 for Northern Transmissions, highlighting the lighter tone and more direct recording style while singling out "The Weak" as an early standout.

== Track listing ==
All lyrics are written by Elias Rønnenfelt; all music is composed by Iceage.

For Love of Grace & the Hereafter track listing
| No. | Title | Length |
|---|---|---|
| 1. | "Ember" | 3:25 |
| 2. | "Match Head Girl" | 3:31 |
| 3. | "The Weak" | 3:15 |
| 4. | "No Fear" | 3:38 |
| 5. | "Salve for Every Sore" | 3:13 |
| 6. | "Mother-of-Pearl" | 3:43 |
| 7. | "Tender Blades" | 4:03 |
| 8. | "1835" | 3:04 |
| 9. | "Star" | 3:25 |
| 10. | "Lifetime" | 3:43 |
| 11. | "Holy Water" | 2:51 |
| 12. | "True Blue" | 3:24 |
| Total length: | | 41:15 |

== Personnel ==
Credits are adapted the album's liner notes and Tidal.

=== Iceage ===
- Dan Kjær Nielsen – drums, production (all tracks); percussion (tracks 1, 7), background vocals (5), organ (8)
- Jakob Tvilling Pless – bass guitar, production (all tracks); background vocals (5)
- Elias B. Rønnenfelt – vocals, guitar, production (all tracks); glockenspiel (1); chimes, cowbell, Mellotron (2); flute (3), organ (6–8), synthesizer (6), piano (7)
- Johan S. Wieth – guitar, production (all tracks); background vocals (1, 2, 4, 5, 8–10, 12), synthesizer (2), keyboards (12)
- Casper Morilla Fernandez – guitar, production (all tracks); background vocals (5), mandolin (11)

=== Additional contributors ===
- Nis Bysted – production, recording, mixing
- Jens Benz – recording
- Asbjørn Nørrind Hansen – additional engineering
- Jens Ramon – additional engineering
- Oliver Nehammer – additional engineering
- Emil Thomsen – mastering
- Nils Gröndahl – violin (5, 12)
- Elizabeth Peyton – album cover painting
- Ira Rønnenfelt – band photo
- Alex Tults – design assistance

== Charts ==
Chart performance for For Love of Grace & the Hereafter
| Chart (2026) | Peak position |
|---|---|
| Danish Vinyl Albums (Hitlisten) | 4 |
| Scottish Albums (Official Charts) | 82 |
| UK Album Sales (OCC) | 83 |
| UK Album Downloads (Official Charts) | 37 |
| UK Physical Albums (OCC) | 94 |
| UK Independent Albums (Official Charts) | 28 |
| UK Independent Album Breakers (OCC) | 13 |
