= Heavy Glory =

Studio album by Elias Rønnenfelt
- Released: October 25, 2024
- Genres: Rock, Americana
- Length: 41:25
- Label: Escho

Elias Rønnenfelt chronology
Heavy Glory (2024)	lucre (2025)

Singles from Heavy Glory
- 1. "Like Lovers Do" Released: May 28, 2024; 2. "No One Else" Released: August 14, 2024; 3. "Worm Grew a Spine" Released: September 16, 2024; 4. "Soldier Song (feat. Joanne Robertson)" Released: October 10, 2024

Heavy Glory is the debut studio album from Danish musician and Iceage frontman Elias Rønnenfelt. The album was released on October 25, 2024 by Escho, and was preceded by the release of several singles. The album received generally favourable reviews, and was featured on lists for the best albums of 2024.

== Production ==
Every track was produced by Rønnenfelt and Nis Bysted. Rønnenfelt is the sole lyricist on every track except for "Sound of Confusion" (written by Jason Piece and Peter Kember) and "No Place to Fall" (written by Townes Van Zandt)

== Critical reception ==
Professional ratings
Aggregate scores
Source	Rating
Metacritic	65/100
Review scores
Source	Rating
Pitchfork	7.3/10

According to the review aggregator Metacritic, Heavy Glory received "generally favourable reviews" based on a weighted average score of 65 out of 100 from 6 critic scores. In a positive review for Pitchfork, David Glickman viewed the album as Rønnenfelt's "opportunity to branch out from the ferocity of his main outfit", noting that he "seems to focus more on discovery than on crafting a cohesive whole" in his production style.

A less favourable review from DIY described the album as a "jumbled disappointment", and that despite Rønnenfelt's efforts to "echo songwriters past", the directness of his vocal delivery sounds dated in 2024.

== Track listing ==
No.	Title	Length
1.	"Like Lovers Do"	2:50
2.	"Another Round"	3:04
3.	"Doomsday Childsplay"	3:57
4.	"Close" (featuring FAUZIA)	2:17
5.	"No One Else"	3:51
6.	"Stalker"	3:52
7.	"Worm Grew a Spine"	3:50
8.	"Soldier Song" (featuring Joanne Robertson)	3:32
9.	"Unarmed"	3:47
10.	"River of Madelaine"	2:43
11.	"Sound of Confusion"	4:33
12.	"No Place to Fall" (Steve Young cover)	3:09
Total length:		41:25
