= The Attitude Era (album) =

2012 compilation album by Dean Blunt and Inga Copeland

- Cover used on streaming services

Compilation album by Dean Blunt and Inga Copeland
- Released: April 6, 2012
- Genres: Lo-fi; drone

Dean Blunt and Inga Copeland chronology
The Attitude Era (2012)	Black Is Beautiful (2012)

The Attitude Era is a compilation album by British musician Dean Blunt and Estonian musician Inga Copeland. It was exclusively released through The Guardian's website on April 6, 2012, in an article where the duo were interviewed as part of the music and art group Hype Williams. Consisting of 33 tracks, all songs on the album were previously unreleased, with some being made during recording sessions for Hype William's One Nation (2011) and Blunt's The Narcissist mixtapes. The Attitude Era received positive reviews from music critics. In June 2017, it was re-released onto select music streaming services.

== Composition ==
=== Overview ===
The Attitude Era consists of 33 tracks, many of which have titles suggesting they're unfinished. The original download for the album had an unordered tracklist, although its streaming re-release arranges them in alphabetical order. The album spans a variety of genres, with Roberto Rizzo of OndaRock observing elements of drone music, field recordings, UK garage, and UK bass across its tracks.

=== Songs ===
The Attitude Era opens with "_The Sniper", a song where Blunt sings about being a ghost over a sample of "Girl Afraid" by the Smiths. The album's shortest track, "Slugabed (Rejected Remix)", is only three seconds long, consisting of Blunt laughing and saying "fucking joker" alongside a snare. "Schadenfreude" is mostly spoken word, featuring vocals from Copeland and a robotic text-to-speech voice.

== Release ==
The Attitude Era was released on April 5, 2012, as an exclusive download at the end of an interview on The Guardian's website, titled "Hype Williams: do they ever speak the truth?". In the article, writer Ben Beaumont-Thomas talks to the group and attempts to learn their backstory, though is aware that the majority of their statements are either jokes or fabrications, even comparing them to the fable "The Boy Who Cried Wolf" in the piece's opening line. The .ZIP containing the album was downloadable from April 5 to April 19, 2012.

Shortly after the release of The Attitude Era, Blunt and Copeland released the album Black Is Beautiful on April 16. Its opening track, "Venice Dreamway", reuses a coughing sound from the song "Heel Turn (Vocal Version)", but at a slower speed. Similarly, Blunt would reuse a sample of applause from the compilation on the song "The Narcissist" (2012). In June 2017, The Attitude Era was re-released onto select music streaming services. Matt McDermott of Resident Advisor noted that the streaming version of the album was in higher quality than the original download, which he described as "low-bitrate".

== Reception ==
The Attitude Era received positive reviews from music critics. Writing for The Quietus, Rory Gibb said that the album "offers rich pickings, both purely on a sonic level and for those who’ve been enjoying their more thought-provoking forays into blunted dreamworlds, half-sleep states and lo-fi AM radio pop." In a separate article, the publication wrote that "unlike a lot of free outtake records, [it] actually contains rather a lot of good music." Beaumont-Thomas called the compilation "an excellent introduction" to the music of Hype Williams, as despite its rough nature, "Hype Williams have never been about slickness, and its dual nature is compelling."

== Track listing ==
All tracks are written by Dean Blunt and Inga Copeland.

No.	Title	Length
1.	"_The Sniper"	1:20
2.	"80210"	3:06
3.	"Amir (Voc Mix)"	3:43
4.	"Attitude Adjustment"	2:04
5.	"Bar Rumba"	0:17
6.	"Blinder"	2:07
7.	"Copeland Not Ever"	4:04
8.	"Copeland Rumors (Unmastered)"	4:02
9.	"Energy God"	3:47
10.	"Existential Flux"	1:58
11.	"Face Turn (Mastered)"	3:53
12.	"Heel Turn (Vocal Version)"	4:59
13.	"Jericho"	3:22
14.	"Judgement"	0:54
15.	"Luna Vachon"	1:53
16.	"Millenial Turk"	3:55
17.	"Parred"	0:42
18.	"Posion"	1:26
19.	"Progression"	3:47
20.	"Schadenfreude"	2:05
21.	"Showcase Of The Immortals (Ramirez Mix Instrumental)"	1:12
22.	"Sinn Fein"	4:04
23.	"Slugabed (Rejected Remix)"	0:02
24.	"Tape 3 Mix Weds"	1:22
25.	"The Attitude Era"	2:07
26.	"The Mandible Claw"	2:47
27.	"This Is The Remix"	5:53
28.	"Untitled 1"	2:59
29.	"Untitled"	4:10
30.	"White Flight II"	0:27
31.	"White Flight (Refix)"	4:42
32.	"White Flight"	1:20
33.	"y2j"	5:19

Notes

- "_The Sniper" contains samples of "Girl Afraid", written by Morrissey and Johnny Marr, as performed by the Smiths.
