= Mersh (song) =

2014 single by Dean Blunt

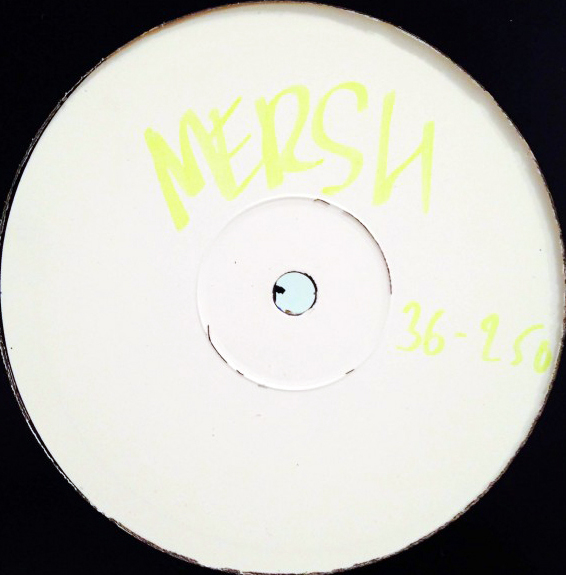

Single by Dean Blunt

from the album Black Metal
- B-side: "Grade"
- Released: April 30, 2014
- Genre: Dub; grime
- Length: 3:26 (album version); 3:29 (VIP)
- Label: Rough Trade Records
- Songwriter: Dean Blunt
- Producer: Dean Blunt

Music video
- "Mersh" on YouTube

"Mersh" is a song by British musician Dean Blunt from his second studio album, Black Metal (2014). It was first released as a music video on YouTube on March 3, 2014, and was later released as a limited edition 10-inch single on April 30 of that year. The vinyl release was accompanied by the B-side "Grade", which later appeared as the album's closing track. Musically, "Mersh" consists of keyboards and computerised drums, with Blunt rapping throughout. Both the song and its video received positive reviews from music critics, with one writer for Vice calling it their second favorite music video of 2014.

== Background and release ==
"Mersh" was first released through its music video, uploaded to YouTube on March 3, 2014. Black Metal, the album it features on, was announced through the video's description. Blunt had previously announced that he signed to Rough Trade, which is the label on which the album later released. The song was later made available on vinyl as a 10-inch single, limited to 250 copies and only sold at Blunt's April 30 performance at the Institute of Contemporary Arts in London. The vinyl's B-side, "Grade", later appeared on Black Metal as the album's closing track, with "Mersh" featuring as its twelfth track.

== Composition ==
"Mersh"
An excerpt from "Mersh", featuring Blunt rapping over "barebones" drum patterns.

Critics generally characterised "Mersh" as being dub, with Robin Murray of Clash comparing it to industrial music. Its production consists of electronic keyboards, which are distorted, and "barebones" programmed drums. The song's sub-bass line is quiet, being "nearly hidden" in the overall composition. Blunt's lyrics are rapped, with Tiny Mix Tapes describing them as being "about the maybe-importance of knowing your limits when feeling anxious or confused". Vice's Brandon Soderberg felt that Blunt's style of rapping on the track was "somber". DMY noted that the song's name, which is slang for low-grade marijuana, represents "an apparent penchant for smoking pot that feeds into his Dean 'Blunt' persona".

== Critical reception ==
"Mersh" received positive reviews from music critics. Listing the song as Blunt's 15th best track, Paste writer Matty Monroe praised its "grimy" nature as being "certifiably nasty compared to the faux debauchery of an artist like The Dare." She complimented Blunt's menacing nature on the song, opining that "seeing those words delivered by a man seemingly detached from the world—backed up by some supremely nasty and blown out dub—is truly something to behold on ['Mersh.']"

== Music video ==
A still from the music video for "Mersh", taken during one of several moments where the red strobe light briefly turns off.

Blunt uploaded the song's music video to YouTube on May 3, 2014, under the alias "pollyjacobsen". In the video, Blunt sits on a couch beside a woman as he mimes along to a song, though his appearance is obscured behind a flickering red strobe light. Both he and the woman nod along to the song, although Blunt is mostly slumped over, only standing up during his verses to seemingly address the camera. A jump cut near the end removes Blunt from the couch, leaving only the woman remaining for the rest of its runtime.

Lauding the video as "brilliantly half-assed", Soderberg named it his second favorite music video of 2024 so far. Complimenting its atmosphere as "palpable", Soderberg said it embodies a "kind of there-but-not-there druggy melancholy dominates the attitude of hip-hop right now, found in everything Drake does (especially the videos for 'Over' and 'Marvin’s Room') and spilling out into other places like the video for French Montana's 'Sanctuary' and 'Mersh' captures it better by not getting ambitious. What most rappers and video directors are spending thousands of bucks to characterize has been captured by Blunt in 'Mersh,' using only a girl, some weed, a bummy couch, a strobe light, and a static camera." Reviewing the video for The Fader, Emile Friedlander said it reminded her that despite Blunt signing with Rough Trade, "he's still the same Dean Blunt we've always known, hanging around on the living room couch of some seedy-looking, after-hours crashpad, sporting all the usual Dean Blunt accessories (the 'normcore' baseball cap, some pretty girl wearing sunglasses)".

== Track listing ==
All music is written and produced by Dean Blunt.

No.	Title	Length
1.	"Mersh" (VIP)	3:29
2.	"Mersh" (Instrumental Mix)	3:17
3.	"Grade"	4:41
Total length:		11:27
