= 100 (Dean Blunt song) =

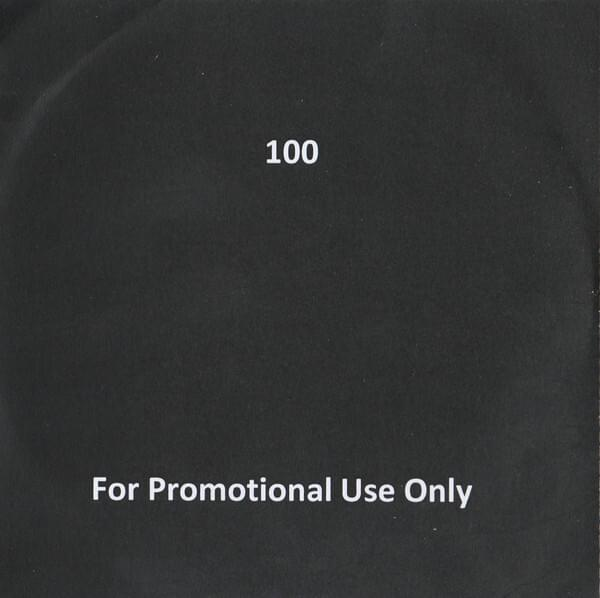

Promotional single by Dean Blunt

from the album Black Metal
- Released: April 13, 2015
- Genre: Indie rock; dream pop
- Length: 3:20
- Label: Rough Trade
- Songwriters: Dean Blunt; Stephen McRobbie
- Producer: Dean Blunt

"100" is a song by British musician Dean Blunt from his second studio album, Black Metal (2014). Written and produced by Blunt, it features additional vocals from Scottish singer Joanne Robertson. It was released as a promotional single on April 13, 2015. It samples "Over My Shoulder" by the Pastels, whose member Stephen McRobbie received writing credits.

"100" received acclaim from music critics, who praised the composition and lyrics. A music video was released on February 19, 2015, and features a transcript from a negative review of Blunt's music by English actor Idris Elba. In 2024, the song went viral on TikTok, and has since become Blunt's most streamed song on Spotify.

== Composition ==
"100"
An excerpt from "100".

"100" is structured around a prominent sample of "Over My Shoulder" by Scottish indie pop band the Pastels, which is layered with additional guitar playing by Blunt. Its genre has been varyingly described as pop and folk rock.

== Reception and legacy ==
"100" received acclaim from music critics, who often praised the composition and lyrics. Cairo Starr of I-D called it "one of the best pop songs in Dean’s catalogue", saying that you could play it on loop forever. In a mixed review of Black Metal, MusicOMH's David Welsh wrote that the song "belatedly raise[s]" the album's quality, complimenting its "rich, deep layers of sound that call the Goldberg Sisters' best efforts to mind." Writing for Hearing Aid, Evelyn Donnelly wrote that Blunt's lyrics, "when combined with the childlike simplicity of the sample convey a reminiscence and yearning that is beautiful to experience." Calling it Blunt's second best song, Matty Monroe of Paste lauded "100" as "one of the greatest pop songs of the last decade." He called it and the rest of Blunt's work "deceptively compelling", opining that its combination of simple lyrics, Blunt's limited vocal range, and liberal use of samples shouldn't work on paper, but still do.

In 2024, "100" went viral on TikTok, with Monroe writing that its virality helped "Blunt's star [rise] to new heights". The song "9" from Blunt's 2019 mixtape Zushi also went viral that same year. "100" is Blunt's most streamed song on Spotify, having 52 million streams as of August 2025.

== Music video ==
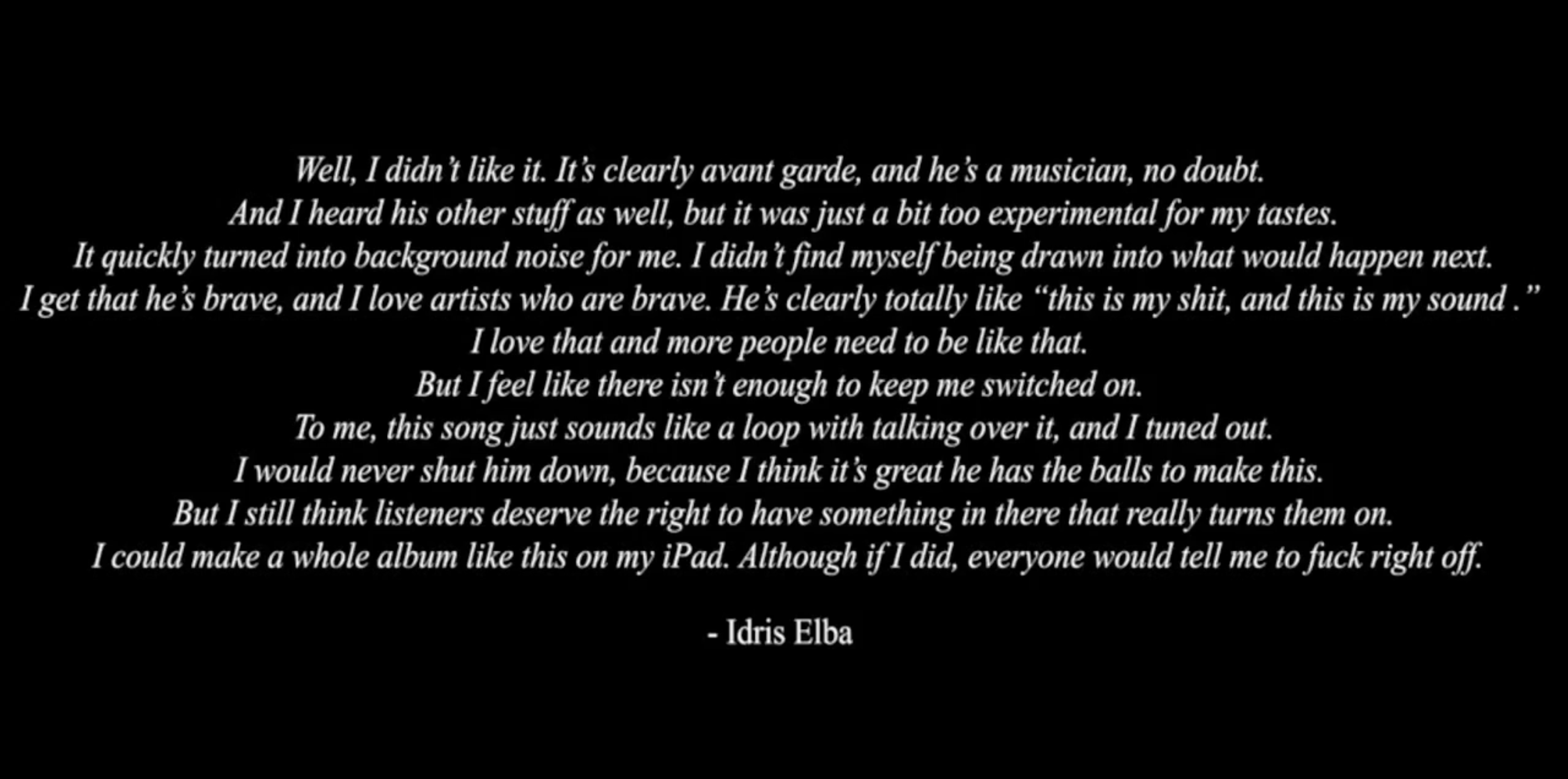
Full transcript shown at the start of the music video for "100".

The music video for "100" was released on February 19, 2015. It opens with a transcript of Idris Elba's review of Blunt's music, taken from a November 2014 interview with Noisey Vice. In the article, Elba referred to Blunt's music as avant-garde, calling it "just a bit too experimental for my tastes." Though he appreciated Blunt's bravery to release music, saying he "would never shut him down, because I think it’s great he has the balls to make this", he opined that he "could make a whole album like this on my iPad. Although if I did, everyone would tell me to fuck right off." Bonnie Mayall of Gigwise interpreted the transcript as a direct response, writing that "Elba underestimated Blunt's love of confrontation." After the text disappears, the music video begins, which consists of Blunt driving around at night alongside his bodyguard.

The music video received positive reviews, with Mayall calling it "tinged with a sense of impending danger, which contrasts the gentle lightness of the track, and it is very effective." The Guardian's music blog opined that it was "an eerily enjoyable watch", while Juice wrote that the video's randomness and wobbly camera work "just make Dean Blunt all the more intriguing in his reticence."
