= As Long as Ropes Unravel Fake Rolex Will Travel =

- Streaming cover

Single by Dean Blunt
- B-side: "Funktion"
- Released: 4 September 2017
- Genre: Post-rock; dream pop
- Length: 6:00
- Label: World Music
- Songwriter: Dean Blunt
- Producer: Dean Blunt

"As Long as Ropes Unravel Fake Rolex Will Travel" (stylized in all lowercase) is a song by British musician Dean Blunt. It was first published onto Blunt's SoundCloud in April 2017, later being released as a white-label 12-inch record on 4 September 2017, alongside its B-side, "Funktion". On 20 March 2020, it was made available on music streaming services alongside several other releases under the World Music label.

== Release ==
"As Long as Ropes Unravel Fake Rolex Will Travel" was originally released onto Blunt's SoundCloud account in April 2017, along with a music video for the Hotep (2017) track "Who Shot Lucious Lyon?" In August, it was made available for purchase on Boomkat's website as a white-label 12-inch record, backed by the B-side "Funktion". The record was officially released on 4 September 2017.

On 20 March 2020, "As Long as Ropes Unravel Fake Rolex Will Travel" was released onto music streaming services along with several other records released under World Music, including Blunt's mixtape Zushi (2019), an extended version of the song "Stalker", and albums from other artists signed to the label.

== Reception ==
"As Long as Ropes Unravel Fake Rolex Will Travel" received generally positive reviews. Writing for Pitchfork, Kevin Lozano called it "a refreshingly simple song: relaxing and free of tension, composed of just a well-wrought guitar riff and the sweet, sleepy intonation of a woman cooing." He called it less "cluttered" than most of Blunt's releases, opining that "it's nice to see Blunt offer a song that's essentially easy listening; for a second, his usual inscrutability dissolves into a contented smile." Mr P of Tiny Mix Tapes simply referred to it as "gorgeous".

Calling the track an influence on his music, French musician Myd wrote that "there's something broken and punk about this track. It feels worn out in the best way. Dean isn’t trying to impress anyone. This gave me permission to keep the cracks. To leave things messy if they feel honest.”

== Track listing ==
All tracks are written by Dean Blunt.

White-label release (WMA12-002)
No.	Title	Length
1.	"As Long as Ropes Unravel Fake Rolex Will Travel"	6:00
2.	"Funktion"	2:55
Total length:		8:55
