= Trident (song) =

2014 single by Dean Blunt

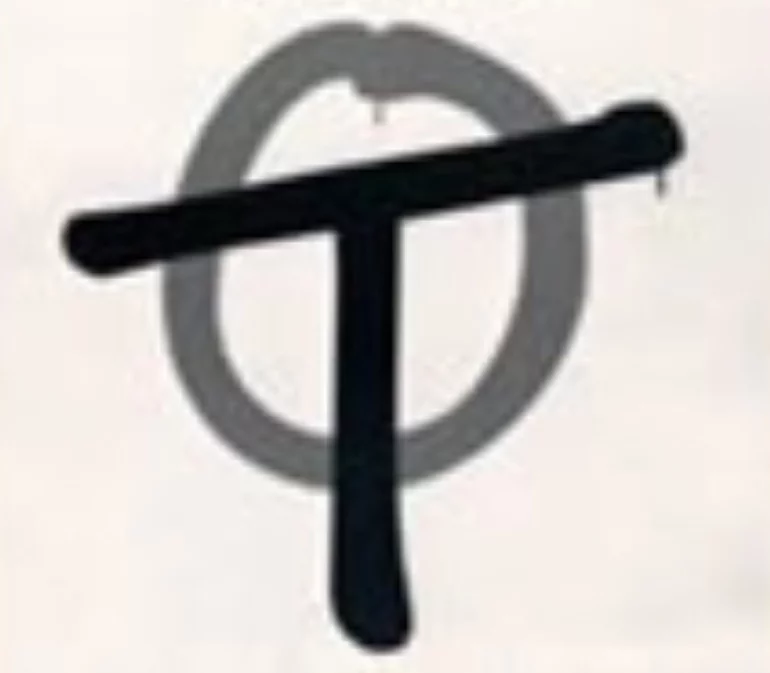
- Cover art for "Trident 2"

Single by Dean Blunt
- A-side: "50 Cent"
- Released: November 3, 2014
- Length: 5:16
- Label: Rough Trade Records
- Songwriter: Dean Blunt
- Producer: Dean Blunt

"Trident" is a song by British musician Dean Blunt. It was first released through a music video on September 30, 2014, and was formally released on November 3, 2014, as the B-side to Blunt's "50 Cent" 12-inch single. The song is named after Operation Trident, a defunct Metropolitan Police unit. A sequel song, titled "Trident 2", (Note: Sometimes written as "Trident, Part 2".) was released in October 2014, and is a spoken word piece about East London gang wars between the Tottenham Mandem and the Hackney Boys.

== Background and release ==
Both parts of "Trident" were inspired by gang violence in Hackney, London. "Trident 2" was inspired by gang wars between the Hackney Boys and Tottenham Mandem gangs, which took place from the late 1990s to the early 2000s in East London. Both songs are named after Operation Trident, a defunct Metropolitan Police unit set up to tackle "black-on-black" gun crime following a series of shootings in the London boroughs of Lambeth and Brent.

"Trident" was first released through its music video on September 30, 2014, later being included as the B-side to the 12-inch vinyl release of "50 Cent" on November 3, 2014. "50 Cent" was previously released as a single on September 9, 2014, along with the release date of Blunt's second studio album, Black Metal (2014).

== Reception ==
Chris Deville of Stereogum compared "Trident" to the second half of Talking Heads' 1980 album Remain In Light, though "refracted through the lens of bizarre outsider hip-hop." The Vinyl Factory named the "50 Cent/Trident" vinyl one of the best releases of the week, with Kelly Doherty writing that the latter track "devastatingly captures the isolation of urban life."

== Trident 2 ==
The sequel to "Trident", titled "Trident 2", was released to SoundCloud in October 2014 under Blunt's alias @jesuschrist3000ADHD. In the song, Blunt recites an article about the violent feud between the Tottenham Mandem and the Hackneys Boys over a looped goth-rock sample.

=== Reception ===
"Trident 2" received generally positive reviews. Samuel Diamond of Tiny Mix Tapes compared it to the work of Linton Kwesi Johnson, though noted that "where Johnson composed dub poems set to music produced by others, Blunt seems to have simply recited excerpts from an article over more than eight minutes of (possibly) original music." For Clash, Robin Murray said it had "an interesting viewpoint, one that is frequently bypassed in British music"; another article by the magazine opined that it "offers listeners a greater insight into [Blunt's] world than ever before." At Flavorwire, Tom Hawking one of the week's best releases, feeling that it "works surprisingly well, even if the details of shooting after shooting are both depressing and all-too-familiar." Reviewing Roaches 2012-2019, Resident Advisor's Maya-Roisin Slater praised the song's inclusion, writing that "[b]y archiving it in this medium, Blunt returns the song to its ancient use as a vessel for history, capturing the story in a way that's both rich and emotionally resonant."
