= Black Metal 2 =

Studio album by Dean Blunt
- Released: 11 June 2021
- Genre: Experimental
- Length: 23:26
- Label: Rough Trade
- Producers: Dean Blunt; Giles Kwakeulati King-Ashong

Dean Blunt chronology
Disasterpiece OST (2020)	Black Metal 2 (2021)	Freestyles (SS22) (2022)

Black Metal 2 is the third studio album by British musician Dean Blunt, released on Rough Trade Records on 11 June 2021. The album was only formally announced on 8 June 2021, following pictures being posted to the social media accounts of collaborators Vegyn and James Massiah depicting a billboard with the album cover; however, references had been made to it by Blunt prior to this, as far back as 2016, including in the description of various releases on SoundCloud. It serves as a sequel to his 2014 album Black Metal and features an edited version of that cover as its album cover. The album features additional vocals from Joanne Robertson on six songs.

The album was produced by Blunt and Giles Kwakeulati King-Ashong of Speakers Corner Quartet, also known as Kwake Bass. The album also features instrumental performances by Mica Levi.

== Critical reception ==
Professional ratings
Aggregate scores
Source	Rating
AnyDecentMusic?	7.9/10
Metacritic	84/100
Review scores
Source	Rating
Beats per Minute	79%
Exclaim!	8/10
The Guardian	4/5 stars
Pitchfork	8.1/10
PopMatters	8/10

Black Metal 2 was met with very positive reviews; on review aggregator Metacritic it has a score of 84/100, indicating "universal acclaim", and according to the same website, it is Blunt's best-received album.

=== Accolades ===
Black Metal 2 on year-end lists
Publication	List	Rank	Ref.
Clash	Clash Albums of the Year 2021	22	
Crack	The Top 50 Albums of the Year	42	
Dazed	The Best Albums of 2021	20	
Dummy Magazine	The 25 Best Albums of 2021	16	
Gorilla vs. Bear	Gorilla vs. Bear's Albums of 2021	6	
Les Inrockuptibles	Our Top 50 Albums of 2021	4	
Loud and Quiet	Loud and Quiet Albums of the Year 2021	15	
Mojo	The 75 Best Albums of 2021	51	
Pitchfork	The 50 Best Albums of 2021	19	
The Quietus	Quietus Albums of the Year 2021	3	
Resident Advisor	The Best Albums of 2021	–	
Vinyl Me, Please	The Best Albums of 2021	–	

== Track listing ==
All tracks written by Dean Blunt, except where noted. All tracks produced by Blunt and Giles Kwakeulati King-Ashong.

No.	Title	Writer(s)	Length
1.	"Vigil"	Dean Blunt; Joanne Robertson	2:30
2.	"Mugu"		1:39
3.	"Dash Snow"	Blunt; Robertson	2:00
4.	"Sketamine"	Blunt; Robertson	2:32
5.	"Semtex"		1:27
6.	"La Raza"		1:44
7.	"Nil by Mouth"	Blunt; Robertson	2:40
8.	"ZaZa"		2:06
9.	"Woosah"		3:02
10.	"The Rot"	Blunt; Robertson	3:43

== Charts ==
Chart performance for Black Metal 2
Chart (2021)	Peak position
UK Independent Albums (Official Charts)	39
UK Independent Albums Breakers Chart (OCC)	10
UK Official Record Store Chart (OCC)	28
