= The Redeemer (album) =

Studio album by Dean Blunt
- Released: 1 May 2013
- Genre: Experimental
- Length: 44:02
- Labels: Hippos in Tanks; World Music
- Producers: Dean Blunt; Arca

Dean Blunt chronology
The Narcissist II (2012)	The Redeemer (2013)	Stone Island (2013)

The Redeemer is the debut studio album by British musician Dean Blunt. It was released on 1 May 2013 through Hippos in Tanks and World Music.

== Critical reception ==
The Redeemer received generally positive reviews from music critics. At Metacritic, which assigns a normalized rating out of 100 to reviews from professional publications, the album received an average score of 71, based on 13 critic scores, indicating "generally favorable reviews". Similarly, aggregator AnyDecentMusic? gave it 7.1 out of 10, based on seven critic scores.

Professional ratings
Aggregate scores
Source	Rating
AnyDecentMusic?	7.1/10
Metacritic	71/100
Review scores
Source	Rating
Consequence	C+
NME	3/5 stars
Pitchfork	6.1/10
PopMatters	8/10
Tiny Mix Tapes	4.5/5 marks

=== Accolades ===
Following its release, The Redeemer was featured on several publication's year-end lists. Naming it the 68th best album of the 2010s, Colin Joyce of Vice wrote that it's "theoretically a breakup album—there are lonely voicemails and mournful ballads scattered across the record—but it’s opaque and fragmented. The narrative, if there even is one, is hard to parse." He called the album "confusing by design", feeling that it accurately "sounds how a breakup feels—you’re lost in a fog of your own creation." Listing the album alongside Blunt's mixtape Stone Island (2013) as the fourth best album of 2013, Manhattan Digest's Rio Toro opined that, although he always liked The Redeemer, he "didn't think it would be an album I would enjoy coming back to time and time again as the months went on. I thought of it as being too damaged to truly love."

Select rankings of The Redeemer
Publication	List	Year	Rank	Ref.
Fact	The 50 Best Albums of 2013	2013	1	
Gorilla vs. Bear	Gorilla vs. Bear's albums of 2013	2013	22	
Manhattan Digest	Best albums of 2013	2013	4	
Tiny Mix Tapes	Favorite 50 Albums of 2013	2013	2	
Vice	The 100 Best Albums of the 2010s	2019	66	

== Track listing ==
All tracks written and produced by Dean Blunt, except "The Redeemer" (co-produced with Arca).

No.	Title	Length
1.	"I Run New York"	0:36
2.	"The Pedigree"	2:27
3.	"Demon"	5:00
4.	"Flaxen"	4:09
5.	"V"	0:50
6.	"The Redeemer"	3:32
7.	"The Seven Seals of Affirmation"	2:14
8.	"Walls of Jericho"	3:44
9.	"Make It Official"	1:44
10.	"Need 2 Let U Go"	2:34
11.	"Dread"	0:58
12.	"Y3"	1:31
13.	"Papi"	2:17
14.	"MMIX"	0:55
15.	"All Dogs Go to Heaven"	5:33
16.	"Imperial Gold"	2:28
17.	"Predator"	0:14
18.	"Brutal"	3:23
19.	"Par"	0:06
Total length:		44:02

Notes

- "I Run New York" contains a sample of "All My Life" by K-Ci & JoJo.
- "Demon" and "Imperial Gold" feature vocals from Joanne Robertson
- "Demon" and "Need 2 Let U Go" feature uncredited trumpet from David Gray
- "Demon" contains a sample of "Sat in Your Lap" by Kate Bush.
- "The Redeemer" features vocals from Inga Copeland and a sample of "Oh Daddy" by Fleetwood Mac.
- "Need 2 Let U Go" features uncredited vocals from Kieran Kennedy Young, S. Bronze, and Thomas Bush
- "All Dogs Go to Heaven" features uncredited guitar from Alexander Fnug Olsen
- "Brutal" features uncredited piano from Lin Sien Koong and contains a sample of "The Roof" by Mariah Carey.
- All tracks feature uncredited mastering from Amir Shoat
