= Black Is Beautiful (Dean Blunt and Inga Copeland album) =

Studio album by Dean Blunt and Inga Copeland
- Released: 16 April 2012
- Genres: Experimental; electronic
- Length: 39:27
- Label: Hyperdub
- Producers: Dean Blunt; Inga Copeland

Black Is Beautiful is a collaborative studio album by British musician Dean Blunt and Estonian musician Inga Copeland released on April 16th 2012 as their debut full-length on the Hyperdub label. The record features 15 tracks characterized by hazy production, blending electronic elements with experimental structures and lo-fi aesthetics, including reverbed vocals, synthscapes, and sampled percussion. It was issued in formats such as CD, vinyl, and digital, with production credits including keyboards by Copeland. The album received critical acclaim for its disorienting yet immersive "gloriously messy" sound from Pitchfork, as well it was favourited by critics as underground electronic and hypnagogic pop circles for its rejection of conventional song structures in favor of atmospheric improvisation.

== Background and production ==
Dean Blunt, born Roy Chukwuemeka Nnawuchi, is a British musician and producer from Hackney, London, who initially played bass in the early project “Graffiti Island” before gaining recognition through experimental electronic work. He maintained a high degree of anonymity in his early career, avoiding conventional promotional tactics and interviews.

Inga Copeland, born Alina Astrova in Russia and raised partly in Estonia, relocated to London in her mid-teens after her family moved there. She later studied art criticism at St. Martins. Prior to music production, she had no formal background in creating it, having been exposed mainly to mainstream media like MTV during her youth in post-Soviet Eastern Europe. Copeland began producing electronic music specifically upon joining forces with Blunt.

The pair collaborated as the duo Hype Williams starting around 2007, operating out of London (later Berlin) and building an underground following through self-released, DIY-distributed material often shared via unconventional methods like USB sticks at markets, which led to a connection with the Hyperdub label.

Their pre-2012 output included albums such as Untitled and One Nation, alongside EPs like High Beams and Kelly Price W8 Gain Vol. II, characterized by lo-fi, collage-like recordings that eschewed traditional structures. By 2011, Hype Williams had begun transitioning from the shared pseudonym to individual credits, with Blunt issuing early solo releases and the duo preparing joint work under their own names, culminating in their 2012 Hyperdub album Black Is Beautiful.

Recording drew directly from Hype Williams methods, emphasizing live taping with basic equipment including tape machines and a two-string bass. Dean Blunt favored analog tape for its familiarity, avoiding digital tools like Audacity due to a lack of patience for software learning, though he noted its potential for mixing. Tapes were frequently reused and overdubbed immediately after computer transfer, resulting in inherent artifacts like hiss and residual "ghost" layers from prior sessions.

== Composition and style ==
Black Is Beautiful employs a hypnagogic pop and experimental electronic aesthetic, marked by lo-fi distortion and reverb-saturated vocals that produce a hazy, immersive soundscape. These production choices, including crunched textures and kinetic drum machine patterns, foster disorientation and dreamlike fragmentation rather than melodic resolution. The album's 15 tracks, mostly untitled and numbered with brief runtimes, span a total of approximately 39 minutes.

== Release and commercial aspects ==
The album appeared in multiple physical and digital formats, including a standard CD edition (catalog HDBCD012) and a red vinyl LP pressing (catalog HDBLP012). Digital downloads were also offered via platforms associated with Hyperdub, such as Bandcamp, ensuring accessibility beyond physical stock.

The album received limited promotion, primarily through a promotional CD-R version distributed by Hyperdub to industry contacts and media outlets. This approach aligned with the label's focus on niche electronic and experimental audiences, eschewing large-scale advertising campaigns or mainstream media tie-ins. Additional exposure came via informal online channels, including full-album uploads to YouTube and availability on platforms like SoundCloud, fostering word-of-mouth dissemination within underground communities rather than broad marketing efforts.

Commercially, Black Is Beautiful did not enter any major music charts, such as the UK Albums Chart or Billboard 200, reflecting its constrained reach in the experimental genre. Sales were handled through Hyperdub's direct channels, including physical formats like vinyl and CD via the label's site and Bandcamp, with no publicly reported figures indicating significant volume or certifications. Post-release, the album maintained digital availability on streaming services like Spotify, contributing to modest ongoing plays but without evidence of commercial breakthroughs or expanded market penetration.

== Critical reception ==
Critics praised Black Is Beautiful for its experimental innovation and lo-fi aesthetics upon its April 2012 release, though opinions divided on its structural coherence. The album holds a Metacritic score of 68 out of 100, derived from 13 reviews comprising nine positive, four mixed, and zero negative assessments. Publications such as SPIN rated it 8 out of 10, commending the duo's "sensitive side" evident in "flea-market beats and stoned new age" elements that evoked a hazy, atmospheric intimacy.

Pitchfork assigned a 7.4 out of 10, portraying the record as "a trip through the fragments of [the duo's] collective psyches," with reviewers appreciating how abstraction intertwined with structure to yield playful, psychedelic shards of sound and treated audio ephemera. Similarly, Fact Magazine and Tiny Mix Tapes both scored it 80 out of 100, lauding its succinct refinement within hypnagogic pop influences, including warped synths and distant vocals that advanced the duo's boundary-pushing style.

Drowned in Sound gave it 6 out of 10, deeming it a "rather bitty album" obstructed by "dead ends and retreaded ground," with abrupt fades, silences, and impenetrable samples rendering accessible moments scarce and the overall effort "shabby and uninspiring" relative to contemporaries. NME echoed this with a 60 out of 100, critiquing its deliberate obtuseness as impeding broader engagement despite flashes of intrigue.

Professional ratings
Aggregate scores
| Source | Rating |
|---|---|
| AnyDecentMusic? | 7.1/10 |
| Metacritic | 68/100 |
Review scores
| Source | Rating |
| Pitchfork | 7.4/10 |
| Tiny Mix Tapes | 4/5 stars |
| Under the Radar | 4/5 stars |

The album received positive reviews, and was ranked the second-best album of the 2010s decade by Tiny Mix Tapes.

== Track listing ==
| No. | Title | Length |
|---|---|---|
| 1. | "1 (Venice Dreamway)" | 2:32 |
| 2. | "2" | 2:14 |
| 3. | "3" | 0:48 |
| 4. | "4" | 2:26 |
| 5. | "5 (But Life Goes On Nahmean)" | 2:39 |
| 6. | "6" | 0:35 |
| 7. | "7" | 0:51 |
| 8. | "8" | 2:39 |
| 9. | "9" | 5:16 |
| 10. | "10" | 9:24 |
| 11. | "11" | 1:50 |
| 12. | "12" | 2:38 |
| 13. | "13" | 1:03 |
| 14. | "14" | 1:14 |
| 15. | "15" | 3:16 |

== Personnel and credits ==
Credits adapted from AllMusic.

- Dean Blunt - Primary Artist
- Dean Blunt & Inga Copeland - Primary Artist
- Inga Copeland - Primary Artist
