= Zushi (mixtape) =

Mixtape by Dean Blunt
- Released: September 6, 2019
- Length: 36:53
- Label: World Music

Dean Blunt chronology
Desert Sessions (2018)	Zushi (2019)	King of R&B (2019)

Zushi (stylised in uppercase) is a 2019 mixtape by British musician Dean Blunt. The album was initially premiered during Blunt's residency on NTS Radio on September 6, 2019, and was released on streaming platforms on March 27, 2020 through Blunt's World Music label.

== Background and release ==
The mixtape was premiered during Blunt's month-long "World Music Residency", in which Blunt would share "unreleased music and mixes featuring friends and various artists".

== Composition ==
Unlike other projects, Blunt does not provide any vocals on Zushi, appearing solely in a production capacity. Because of this absence, Malachi Lui for Tracking Angle wrote that "the lack of Blunt's vocals keeps it from being absolutely essential, but it's still one of many very solid entries in his large catalog".

== Critical reception ==
"9" featuring Panda Bear was ranked as Blunt's sixteenth best song by Paste, describing it as some of Lennox's best vocal work, both "solo or as a member of Animal Collective.

== Track listing ==
No.	Title	Length
1.	"In"	1:06
2.	"2" (featuring Panda Bear)	2:40
3.	"3" (featuring Joanne Robertson)	1:22
4.	"4"	1:38
5.	"5" (featuring Joanne Robertson)	1:37
6.	"6" (featuring Joanne Robertson)	2:18
7.	"7"	0:42
8.	"8"	1:05
9.	"9" (featuring Panda Bear)	1:27
10.	"10" (featuring Joanne Robertson)	1:01
11.	"11" (featuring Joanne Robertson)	1:33
12.	"ZUSHI"	1:47
13.	"Damaged"	0:50
14.	"14"	1:46
15.	"Desert Storm" (featuring Asger Hartvig)	1:23
16.	"16" (featuring jonatan leandoer96)	1:25
17.	"17"	2:28
18.	"Allison"	0:22
19.	"19" (featuring A$AP Rocky and Sauce Walka)	2:40
20.	"Biafra"	1:05
21.	"bare"	3:44
22.	"22"	0:17
23.	"Slacker" (featuring Joanne Robertson)	1:15
24.	"Out"	1:22
