= Soul on Fire (disambiguation) =

Soul on Fire is a 2025 American biographical drama film. It may also refer to:

- "Soul on Fire", a song by LaVern Baker from her self-titled debut album, 1953
- "Soul on Fire", a song by HIM from Love Metal, 2004
- Soul on Fire, a 2005 album by KMC, and its title track
- "Soul on Fire", a song by Spiritualized from Songs in A&E, 2008
- "Soul on Fire", a song by Third Day featuring All Sons & Daughters from Lead Us Back: Songs of Worship, 2015
- Soul on Fire (EP), an EP by British musician Dean Blunt, 2018
- "Soul on Fire", a song by Godsmack from Lighting Up the Sky, 2023
