= Papi (Dean Blunt song) =

Promotional single by Dean Blunt

from the album The Redeemer
- Released: January 29, 2013
- Genre: Soul-pop
- Length: 2:17
- Label: Hippos in Tanks; World Music
- Songwriter: Dean Blunt
- Producer: Dean Blunt

"Papi" is a song by British musician Dean Blunt from his debut studio album, The Redeemer (2013). It was released to Blunt's SoundCloud account on January 29, 2013, as a promotional single for the album. A soul-pop song, it samples "Echoes" by Pink Floyd.

== Composition ==
Musically, "Papi" is a soul-pop song, built off a sampled section from "Echoes" by Pink Floyd. Its production features strings and jazz piano. Blunt sings in a baritone, and the song's lyrics are about the ups and downs of a relationship. His opening lines address a person who "brings out the best of me", though he later hints at problems in his relationship, singing that "It's not about the things I did to you". The song ends with a sample of a New Years countdown, starting from ten. DMY compared it to the movie samples used in Blunt's 2012 mixtape The Narcissist II, writing that the countdown "pulls the plug on all the emotion and thoughtfulness – just as it was at its most charged."

== Critical reception ==
"Papi" received positive reviews from music critics. Pitchfork's Ruth Saxelby wrote that it "reveals a very different side of Blunt" by highlighting "the theatrical quality of his artistry" more than his previous work, calling it "a disarmingly raw song that stirs up a cacophony of emotion as its lonely refrain takes up residence in your brain." Chris of Gorilla vs. Bear called it "[j]ust as bizarre and heartbreaking as Blunt's devastating 'The Narcissist,' though in very different ways." The Quietus felt that the song's release "signals quite a shift away from the hazy sound of Hype Williams, finding his voice emerging to the fore with a far clearer and less stoned feel." In his Obscure Sound blog, Mike Mineo praised Blunt's "excellent usage" of "Echoes", writing that it was "a nice way to dig into Blunt's new album". DMY opined that the song "is over before you know it, but as is often the way in the world of Hype Williams, the lingering air of uncertainty is palpable."
