= Lockdown Blues =

Single by Iceage
- Released: 2 April 2020
- Studio: Black Tornado; Copenhagen, Denmark
- Genre: Post-punk; art punk
- Length: 3:57
- Label: Escho
- Songwriter(s): Johan Surrballe Wieth; Dan Kjær Nielsen; Elias Bender Rønnenfelt; Jakob Tvilling Pless; Casper Morilla
- Producer(s): Lars Lundholm; Nis Bysted

Iceage singles chronology
"Hurrah" (2018)	"Lockdown Blues" (2020)

"Lockdown Blues" is a single by Danish art punk band Iceage. The standalone single was released on 2 April 2020 through Escho.

== Background ==
The song was written, recorded, and released during the COVID-19 pandemic and touches on the reality of quarantine and the sense of anxiety and loneliness associated with quarantine. In a statement on the song, they state that "we’ve felt the urge to touch base now that the physical touch has been suspended and contribute an effort to raise spirits in the face of adversity. Our thoughts are with all those in jeopardy to the many various horrors in relation to the crisis, those situated on the front lines and those who are direly compromised."

Proceeds from the song's sales went to Doctors Without Borders.

== Recording ==
The song was recorded in March 2020 at Black Tornado Studios in Copenhagen, Denmark.

== Critical reception ==
Spin Magazine writer, David Kohn called the "Lockdown" an urgent song with driving guitars.

== Personnel ==
- Songwriting – Iceage
- Performance – Iceage
- Production – Iceage
- Recording Engineering – Lars Lundholm
- Mixing – Nis Bysted
- Mastering – ET Mastering
