= Seek Shelter =

2021 studio album by Iceage

Studio album by Iceage
- Released: 7 May 2021
- Studios: Namouche Studios Lisbon, Portugal
- Genre: Post-punk
- Length: 41:24
- Label: Mexican Summer
- Producers: Iceage; Nis Bysted; Sonic Boom

Iceage chronology
| Beyondless (2018) | Seek Shelter (2021) | For Love of Grace & the Hereafter (2026) |

Singles from Seek Shelter
- 1. "The Holding Hand" Released: 2 February 2021; 2. "Vendetta" Released: 17 February 2021; 3. "Shelter Song" Released: 24 March 2021

Seek Shelter is the fifth studio album by Danish punk rock band Iceage. It was released on 7 May 2021, by Mexican Summer. A post-punk album with classic rock and Britpop influences, Seek Shelter experiments with diverse sounds that recalls the music of the Pogues, the Replacements, the Rolling Stones, and the Velvet Underground. Upon release, the album was met with widespread critical acclaim with praise towards its eclectic sound and poetic lyricism.

== Background and release ==
Seek Shelter follows Iceage's 2018 album, Beyondless. Recorded in "lengthy" sessions in Namouche Studios in Lisbon, Portugal, the album was produced by Iceage in collaboration with Sonic Boom of Spacemen 3 and their longtime collaborator Nis Bysted. The album features guest appearances from guitarist Casper Morilla Fernandez and the Lisboa Gospel Collective. It was mixed by Shawn Everett. The record was announced in February 2021, alongside the cover-art and tracklist. The album closer "The Holding Hand" was served as the first single from the album on 2 February. "Vendetta" was released as the album's second single on 17 February. The title track was delivered as the third and final single from the album on 24 March. Seek Shelter was released on 7 May 2021 by Mexican Summer.

== Critical reception ==
Professional ratings
Aggregate scores
| Source | Rating |
|---|---|
| AnyDecentMusic? | 7.9/10 |
| Metacritic | 83/100 |
Review scores
| Source | Rating |
| AllMusic | 3.5/5 stars |
| DIY | 4/5 stars |
| Exclaim! | 9/10 |
| Gigwise | 9/10 stars |
| The Line of Best Fit | 9/10 |
| Loud and Quiet | 8/10 |
| NME | 4/5 stars |
| Paste | 7.7/10 |
| Pitchfork | 8.3/10 |
| Under the Radar | 8.5/10 |

At Metacritic, which assigns a weighted average rating out of 100 to reviews from mainstream publications, this release received an average score of 83, based on 16 reviews, indicating "universal acclaim". At AnyDecentMusic?, which collates album reviews from websites, magazines and newspapers, they gave the release a 7.9 out of 10, based on a critical consensus of 18 reviews.

Pitchfork writer Stuart Berman selected Seek Shelter as one of the best rock records of its release week, and wrote that it "completes [Iceage]'s transformation from grim-faced nihilists to wearied soothsayers" while also retaining their "restless spirit". Matthew Ritchie of Exclaim! called the album a "stunning achievement". He praised it for showcasing Iceage as "refusing to be pigeonholed and instead reaching out — exploring life, love and the lack thereof — and ending up exactly where they should be." Gigwise's Adam England praised the album as Iceage's "most accessible record yet". Labelling it as "a rollercoaster ride of diverse influences", Joe Goggins from DIY commended the experimentation with eclectic sounds and "earnest" lyricism.

Lizzie Manno of Paste lauded Rønnenfelt's lyricism which she described as "evocative yet elusive" and felt "deliberately impressionistic", calling the album "a statement of tireless reinvention". NME's Patrick Clarke viewed it as "a record overflowing in grandeur, a vast emotional release after a decade spent coiled like a spring". Laim Martin of AllMusic opined that the album showcases the band's "flair for the theatric, leaving their scrappy beginnings firmly behind", and concluded that Seek Shelter is "a triumph for the band, born out of strange times, and although it may not be their best, their blend of bitter and sweet still rings true".

== Track listing ==
All lyrics are written by Elias Bender Rønnenfelt; all music is composed by Iceage; and all tracks are produced by Sonic Boom, Nis Bysted, and Iceage.

Seek Shelter track listing
| No. | Title | Length |
|---|---|---|
| 1. | "Shelter Song" | 5:29 |
| 2. | "High & Hurt" | 4:09 |
| 3. | "Love Kills Slowly" | 4:10 |
| 4. | "Vendetta" | 5:13 |
| 5. | "Drink Rain" | 3:28 |
| 6. | "Gold City" | 4:13 |
| 7. | "Dear Saint Cecilia" | 4:51 |
| 8. | "The Wider Powder Blue" | 4:25 |
| 9. | "The Holding Hand" | 5:26 |
| Total length: | | 41:24 |

Japanese edition bonus track
| No. | Title | Length |
|---|---|---|
| 10. | "Shelter Song" (Acoustic) | 5:17 |
| Total length: | | 46:41 |

== Personnel ==
Credits adapted from Tidal.

- Iceage – primary vocals, producer (all tracks)
- Sonic Boom – producer, writer (all tracks)
- Nis Bysted – producer, writer (all tracks)
- Elias Bender Rønnenfelt – writer (all tracks)
- Gospel Collective – vocals (tracks 1, 3)
- Emil Thompsen – mastering, studio personnel (all tracks)
- Shawn Everett – mixings, studio personnel (all tracks)
- Nils Gröndahl – violin (tracks 1, 9)
- Anders P. Jensen – piano (tracks 4, 5, 6)
- Ned Ferm – saxophone (track 4, 7, 8)
- Mads Hyne – trombone (track 4, 7, 8)
- Kasper Tranberg – trumpet (track 4, 7, 8)

== Charts ==
Chart performance for Seek Shelter
| Chart (2021) | Peak position |
|---|---|
| Danish Albums (Hitlisten) | 9 |
| Scottish Albums (Official Charts) | 27 |
| UK Independent Albums (Official Charts) | 9 |
| UK Rock & Metal Albums (Official Charts) | 1 |
