= Plowing Into the Field of Love =

Studio album by Iceage
- Released: October 6, 2014
- Recorded: February 2014
- Genre: Gothic rock; post-punk; punk rock
- Length: 47:54
- Label: Matador
- Producer: Nis Bysted and Iceage

Iceage chronology
You're Nothing (2013)	Plowing Into the Field of Love (2014)	Beyondless (2018)

Singles from Plowing Into the Field of Love
- 1. "The Lord's Favorite" Released: July 24, 2014; 2. "Forever" Released: September 4, 2014; 3. "How Many" Released: September 19, 2014

Plowing Into the Field of Love is the third studio album by Danish punk band Iceage. The album was released through Matador Records on October 6, 2014 worldwide and on October 7, 2014 in the US.

== Reception ==
Professional ratings
Aggregate scores
Source	Rating
AnyDecentMusic?	7.5/10
Metacritic	76/100
Review scores
Source	Rating
AllMusic	3.5/5 stars
Alternative Press	4/5 stars
Consequence of Sound	B
Exclaim!	8/10
MusicOMH	5/5 stars
NME	8/10
Pitchfork	8.5/10
PopMatters	7/10
Rolling Stone	3.5/5 stars
Tiny Mix Tapes	4/5 marks

Plowing Into the Field of Love received positive reviews from critics, achieving a 76/100 on Metacritic based on 21 reviews, indicating "generally favourable reviews". Kyle Greco of Smash Cut Reviews gave the album a positive review calling it "one of the more inventive and replayable punk records of the year." He gave the album a score of 8.8/10.

== Track listing ==
All lyrics are written by Elias Bender Rønnenfelt; all music is composed by Iceage.

No.	Title	Length
1.	"On My Fingers"	5:14
2.	"The Lord's Favorite"	3:49
3.	"How Many"	3:21
4.	"Glassy Eyed, Dormant and Veiled"	4:33
5.	"Stay"	4:14
6.	"Let It Vanish"	3:58
7.	"Abundant Living"	2:30
8.	"Forever"	4:51
9.	"Cimmerian Shade"	4:35
10.	"Against the Moon"	3:27
11.	"Simony"	3:17
12.	"Plowing into the Field of Love"	4:05
Total length:		47:54

== Personnel ==
Iceage

- Dan Kjær Nielsen – drums, percussions
- Johan Surrballe Wieth – guitar, viola
- Jakob Tvilling Pless – bass, mandolin
- Elias Bender Rønnenfelt – vocal, guitar, piano

Additional musicians

- Asger Valentin – trumpets

Technical personnel

- Mixed by Nis Bysted and Iceage
- Mastered by Emil Thomsen
- Cover photo by Kristian Emdal
- Produced by Nis Bysted and Iceage
