= "BBF" Hosted by DJ Escrow =

Studio album by Babyfather
- Released: 1 April 2016
- Genres: Hip-hop; dub
- Length: 49:50
- Language: English
- Label: Hyperdub
- Producers: Dean Blunt; DJ Escrow; Arca

Babyfather chronology
Platinum Tears (2016)	"BBF" Hosted by DJ Escrow (2016)	419 (2016)

"BBF" Hosted by DJ Escrow is the debut studio album by British experimental group Babyfather (consisting of Dean Blunt, DJ Escrow and Gassman D), released by Hyperdub on 1 April 2016. The album was first announced on 18 February of that year, with the track "Meditation" (featuring Arca as a producer) being released as a twelve-inch single the month before.

== Critical reception ==
Professional ratings
Aggregate scores
Source	Rating
AnyDecentMusic?	6.8/10
Metacritic	72/100
Review scores
Source	Rating
AllMusic	3.5/5 stars
ClashMusic.com	7/10
Mixmag	8/10
Pitchfork	6/10
PopMatters	6/10
The Quietus	6/10
Resident Advisor	4.1/5
Tiny Mix Tapes	4.5/5 marks
The Wire	7/10

"BBF" Hosted by DJ Escrow currently has a score of 72 on Metacritic, indicating "generally favourable reviews".

=== Accolades ===
"BBF" Hosted by DJ Escrow placed first on Tiny Mix Tapes's Favourite 50 Music Releases list for 2016. Resident Advisor gave the album first place on its Top 20 Albums of 2016 list, as well as placing it on its Top Albums of the 2010s list for 2016. The Wire placed the album at number 15 in its Best Releases of 2016 list.

== Track listing ==
All tracks are written by Dean Blunt and DJ Escrow.

No.	Title	Length
1.	"Stealth Intro"	5:02
2.	"Greezebloc"	1:44
3.	"Meditation" (featuring Arca)	5:21
4.	"Escrow"	0:39
5.	"Shook"	2:06
6.	"Motivation"	2:03
7.	"PROLIFIC DEAMONS"	3:03
8.	"Platinum Cookies"	1:14
9.	"Esco Freestyle"	1:56
10.	"Stealth"	2:13
11.	"God Hour" (featuring Micachu)	1:44
12.	"N.A.Z"	2:36
13.	"Juice"	1:06
14.	"HELLS ANGLES"	1:15
15.	"Killuminatti"	2:42
16.	"Escrow 2"	0:25
17.	"Deep" (featuring Arca)	3:11
18.	"Escrow 3"	0:29
19.	"The Realness"	3:21
20.	"Flames"	1:54
21.	"Snm" (featuring Arca)	0:39
22.	"Stealth Outro"	3:26
23.	"Message"	0:50
Total length:		49:50
