= Elias Rønnenfelt =

Danish musical artist

- Rønnenfelt performing with Iceage in 2016

Background information
- Born: Elias Bender Rønnenfelt; March 24, 1992 (age 34); Copenhagen
- Origin: Copenhagen
- Genres: Punk rock; Experimental
- Instruments: Singing; Guitar
- Labels: Escho; World Music
- Member of: Iceage; Marching Church; Vår

Elias Bender Rønnenfelt (ˈe̝ˈliˀæs ˈʁɶnənfɛlt; born March 24, 1992) is a Danish musician and poet best known as the frontman for the punk rock band Iceage. In 2024, Rønnenfelt released his debut solo album Heavy Glory. In 2025, he released his second solo album Speak Daggers.

== Career ==
Rønnenfelt founded the punk rock band Iceage in 2008 with his longtime childhood friends. The quartet released a debut self-titled EP in 2009 through Copenhagen based label Escho, and have since released seven studio albums.

Rønnenfelt made his solo debut with the LP Heavy Glory, followed up by the 2025 album Speak Daggers.

In 2025 he released a collaborative EP with Dean Blunt titled Lucre. Rønnenfelt and Dean Blunt had previously collaborated on the 2023 single "Smile Please". He also appeared on Dean Blunt and Joanne Robertson's 2024 collaborative album Backstage Raver on the track "Repeat Offenders".

== Personal life ==
Rønnenfelt is currently based in Copenhagen.

== Discography ==
Solo works

Title	Album details
Heavy Glory	Type: LP; Released: October 25, 2024; Label: Escho; Format: Digital download, streaming, vinyl
lucre	Type: Collaborative EP with Dean Blunt; Released: February 7, 2025; Label: World Music; Format: Digital download, streaming, vinyl
Speak Daggers	Type: LP; Released: October 17, 2025; Label: Escho; Format: Digital Download, streaming, vinyl
