= Blurrr =

Studio album by Joanne Robertson
- Released: September 19, 2025
- Genre: Experimental
- Length: 43:30
- Label: AD 93
- Producers: Joanne Robertson; Oliver Coates

Joanne Robertson chronology
Backstage Raver (2024)	Blurrr (2025)

Singles from Blurrr
- 1. "Gown" Released: July 22, 2025; 2. "Always Were" Released: August 27, 2025

Blurrr is the sixth solo album by British multidisciplinary artist Joanne Robertson, and her second release with record label AD 93. The album features production by British cellist and composer Oliver Coates. The album's release was preceded by two singles: "Gown" and "Always Were". The album was released on September 19, 2025. Blurrr received acclaim from critics and was named among the best albums of 2025 by several publications.

== Background ==
Little has been published on the background and recording process of Blurrr, however according to Robertson, songs on the album were written in between painting sessions and raising a child.

== Track listing ==
All songs written by Joanne Robertson.

No.	Title	Length
1.	"Ghost"	4:28
2.	"Why Me"	5:35
3.	"Friendly"	7:05
4.	"Exit Vendor"	4:05
5.	"Always Were" (With Oliver Coates)	4:26
6.	"Peaceful"	5:44
7.	"Gown" (With Oliver Coates)	3:16
8.	"Doubt" (With Oliver Coates)	4:01
9.	"Last Hay"	4:55
Total length:		43:30

== Critical reception ==
Professional ratings
Aggregate scores
Source	Rating
Metacritic	90/100
Review scores
Source	Rating
Clash	8/10
Paste	88/100
Pitchfork	9.0/10
The Skinny	4/5 stars

Blurrr has received acclaim from critics. At Metacritic, which assigns a weighted average rating out of 100 to reviews from mainstream critics, Blurrr received a rating of 90 out of 100 based on five critic reviews, indicating "universal acclaim".

Emma Madden, writing for Pitchfork, named the album Robertson's undisputed masterpiece. Devon Chodzin's review for Paste noted and praised the album's approach to improvisation, and described her songs as being at the midpoint of Arthur Russell and Hope Sandoval. Joe Creely, writing for The Skinny, praised Coates' contributions, calling his cello playing as being "the perfect accompanying haze for Robertson's voice to float through". Robin Murray's review for Clash described "Doubt" as having a "hymnal quality", and stated that it may be the finest moment from Robertson's work with Coates so far.

=== Rankings ===
Publication	Accolade	Rank	Ref.
Pitchfork	Pitchfork's 50 Best Albums of 2025	8	
Time	TIME's 10 Best Albums of 2025	6	
Stereogum	Stereogum's 50 Best Albums Of 2025	37	
Clash	Clash's Albums of the Year 2025	25	
The Guardian	The 10 Best Experimental Albums of 2025	1	
Uncut	Uncut's 80 Best Albums of 2025	59	
Crack	Crack Magazine's Top 50 Albums of 2025	22	
Gorilla vs. Bear	Gorilla vs. Bear’s Albums of 2025	5	
Beats per Minute	BPM’s Top 50 Albums of 2025	50	
