= Pain Killer (Iceage song) =

Single by Iceage featuring Sky Ferreira

from the album Beyondless
- Released: 1 March 2018
- Genre: Art punk; jazz fusion; post-punk
- Length: 3:39
- Label: Matador
- Songwriter(s): Elias Bender Rønnenfelt
- Producer(s): Nis Bysted

Iceage featuring Sky Ferreira singles chronology
"Catch It" (2018)	"Pain Killer" (2018)	"Take It All" (2018)

"Pain Killer" is a single performed by Danish art punk band, Iceage. The single was the second single released on their fourth studio album, Beyondless. The track has been praised for its jazz influence, featured horns and backing percussion, and its backing guest vocals from American singer, Sky Ferreira.

The single was released on the band's YouTube on 1 March 2018.

== Music video ==
The song was the only single not to include a music video. Instead the album artwork for Beyondless was released, and the audio was released on YouTube.

== Critical reception ==
The track received widespread acclaim from contemporary music critics. John Norris of Billboard described the track as a "driving standout" on the album, and the music as "Tusk-worthy fanfare of horns". Norris overall described the song as a bold move from the band. Evan Rytlewski of Pitchfork called the horns and jazz influence of the song "splashy", and felt their performance was bombastic. Rytlewski felt the track allows Iceage "let their pheromones fly, flaunting their seductive new sound like it’s a brand new sports car". In a more mixed review, Stereogum's Gabriela Tully Claymore felt the song was a bit drawn out, but that Sky Ferreira's vocals were a welcome addition.
