= Black Metal (Dean Blunt album) =

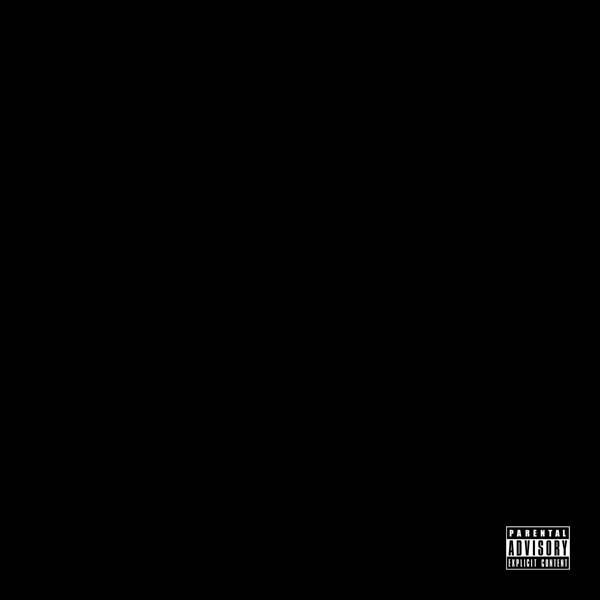

Studio album by Dean Blunt
- Released: 3 November 2014
- Genres: Experimental, indie pop
- Length: 52:31
- Label: Rough Trade
- Producer: Dean Blunt

Dean Blunt chronology
Skin Fade (2014)	Black Metal (2014)	Babyfather (2015)

Singles from Black Metal
- 1. "Mersh" Released: 30 April 2014; 2. "50 Cent" Released: 9 September 2014

Black Metal is the second studio album by British musician Dean Blunt, released by Rough Trade Records on 3 November 2014. The album features vocals from Blunt and frequent collaborator Joanne Robertson. Musically, the album is structured more conventionally than Blunt's previous work, but is diverse in instrumentation and genre. However, despite the name, it is not a black metal album.

== Background and composition ==
Black Metal includes elements of post-punk, post-rock, indie pop, folk, Americana, dub, ambient, grime, and dancehall. Critics have also noted the prose of Blunt's lyrics as being similar to present day hip-hop lyrics, which often reflect dark subjects like infidelity and alcoholism. In a review for The Guardian, Michael Hann characterised the album as consisting of two halves, with the first half having an indie pop sound featuring intricate guitar work reminiscent of Felt and repetitive musical structures, followed by a shift towards more eclectic influences including dub, noise music, soft pop, rap and cut-up.

Blunt has stated that the album was inspired by what he saw as a personal artistic liberation away from the appropriation of "existing old white images" toward "something that is undefined and is new".

In June 2021, Blunt released a sequel album, Black Metal 2.

== Promotion ==
During the 2013 holiday season, Blunt uploaded two songs to the "cplnd" SoundCloud account that later be featured on Black Metal: "50 Cent" and "X". The latter was originally a solo Joanne Robertson track. Blunt also announced his split from label Hippos in Tanks, sending an email to Tiny Mix Tapes stating that "[t]here will be no mo [sic] future Dean Blunt projects released with the label Hippos in Tanks."

Black Metal was announced through the YouTube description music video for "Mersh", released on 3 March 2014. The song was later released as the album's lead single on 30 April 2014 as a 10-inch single, backed by album tracked "Grade" on its B-side. On 9 September, the album's release date was announced, and its second single, "50 Cent", was officially released. The same day as Black Metal's release, a 12-inch vinyl containing the song, as well as the B-side "Trident", was released.

On 5 December 2014, Blunt uploaded the music video for "Lush", which recreates the video for "Bitter Sweet Symphony" by the Verve. A video for "100" was released on 19 February 2015, featuring a transcript from a negative review of Blunt's music by English actor Idris Elba. "100" was later released as a promotional single on 13 April 2015.

== Critical reception ==
Professional ratings
Aggregate scores
Source	Rating
AnyDecentMusic?	7.5/10
Metacritic	79/100
Review scores
Source	Rating
AllMusic	2.5/5 stars
Fact	4.5/5
The Guardian	3/5 stars
Mojo	4/5 stars
NME	9/10
The Observer	4/5 stars
Pitchfork	7.3/10
Q	4/5 stars
Resident Advisor	4.5/5
Uncut	8/10

Black Metal currently has a score of 79 on Metacritic, indicating "generally favorable reviews". Critics praised Blunt's emotional range and directness on the album. In a review for The Observer, Killian Fox wrote that Blunt had created "some of the most achingly beautiful music recorded this year." Writing for Pitchfork, Colin Joyce called the album "disjointed" but praised the album for its sound and for Blunt's clearer, more pop-oriented style compared to his previous work. However, AllMusic's Andy Kellman criticised the album for being "quantity-over-quality" and for what Kellman saw as a derivative sound. Michael Hann characterised the album in The Guardian as a needlessly difficult listen that was sometimes repetitive, but nonetheless praised it as "extraordinary."

=== Accolades ===
Black Metal placed first on Tiny Mix Tapes' and Crack Magazine's lists of best albums from 2014. The latter also named it the best album of the 2010s.

== Track listing ==
All tracks are written by Dean Blunt, except where noted. All tracks are produced by Blunt.

No.	Title	Writer(s)	Length
1.	"Lush"	Blunt; Jody Stephens^{[a]}	1:58
2.	"50 Cent"		2:35
3.	"Blow"		2:31
4.	"100"	Blunt; Stephen McRobbie^{[b]}	3:20
5.	"Heavy"		1:58
6.	"Molly & Aquafina"		4:06
7.	"Forever"		13:00
8.	"X"		8:54
9.	"Punk"		2:34
10.	"Country"		2:10
11.	"Hush"		1:16
12.	"Mersh"		3:25
13.	"Grade"		4:45

Notes

- All tracks are stylized in all caps. For example, "Lush" is stylized as "LUSH".

Sample credits

- ^{^[a]} "Lush" contains a sample of "For You", written by Stephens and performed by Big Star.
- ^{^[b]} "100" contains a sample of "Over My Shoulder", written by McRobbie and performed by The Pastels.
