= Rainbow Edition (album) =

Studio album by Hype Williams
- Released: 25 August 2017
- Genre: Hypnagogic pop
- Length: 36:56
- Label: Big Dada

Hype Williams chronology
Chalice (2017)	Rainbow Edition (2017)	L's (2020)

Rainbow Edition is a studio album by British musical duo Hype Williams. It was released in August 2017 under Big Dada.

== Reception ==
Professional ratings
Aggregate scores
Source	Rating
Metacritic	61/100
Review scores
Source	Rating
AllMusic	3/5 stars
Crack Magazine	8/10
Loud and Quiet	7/10
Mixmag	7/10
Pitchfork	6.4/10
PopMatters	3/10

At Metacritic, which assigns a normalized rating out of 100 to reviews from critics, the album received an average score of 61, which indicates "generally favorable reviews", based on 11 reviews.

=== Accolades ===
Publication	Accolade	Rank	Ref.
Crack Magazine	Top 100 Albums of 2017	60	

== Track listing ==
No.	Title	Length
1.	"Madting"	0:58
2.	"Loud Challenge"	3:26
3.	"The Whole Lay"	2:27
4.	"Baby Blu"	1:22
5.	"Smokebox"	0:50
6.	"Rumor Report"	1:17
7.	"Puredamage"	0:28
8.	"Leimert"	2:40
9.	"#Blackcardsmatter"	4:33
10.	"Sadting"	0:43
11.	"Ask Yee"	2:10
12.	"This Is Mister Bigg. How You Doing Mister Bigg"	1:17
13.	"The Den"	0:55
14.	"Cockblocker Blues"	1:30
15.	"Sweet Chin Musik"	0:34
16.	"Pretty Young Ting"	0:56
17.	"Percy"	1:18
18.	"Spinderella's Dream"	6:18
19.	"Situations"	1:12
20.	"Kandy"	2:02
