= New Brigade =

Studio album by Iceage
- Released: 7 January 2011
- Genre: Art punk; garage rock; no wave; post-punk; punk rock
- Length: 24:09
- Label: What's Your Rupture?

Iceage chronology
New Brigade (2011)	You're Nothing (2013)

New Brigade is the debut studio album by Danish punk rock band Iceage.

== Reception ==
Professional ratings
Aggregate scores
Source	Rating
AnyDecentMusic?	7.8/10
Metacritic	85/100
Review scores
Source	Rating
AllMusic	4/5 stars
The A.V. Club	A−
Consequence of Sound	3.5/5 stars
Drowned in Sound	8/10
NME	9/10
Pitchfork	8.4/10
PopMatters	8/10
Rolling Stone	3.5/5 stars
Spin	9/10
Uncut	4/5 stars

New Brigade was well received by critics upon release. At Metacritic, which assigns a normalized rating out of 100 to reviews from mainstream critics, the album has received an average score of 85, based on 18 reviews, indicating "universal acclaim".

New Brigade received Pitchfork's "Best New Music" designation, with critic David Bevan praising it as a "refreshing and extraordinary debut". He continued, "These four have located a punk-rock sweet spot: mixing the black atmosphere of goth, the wild-limbed whoosh of hardcore, and the clangor of post-punk. It's a feat made all the more impressive by one very important intangible: energy." David Malitz of The Washington Post also praised the debut, saying that "In an era of rock-gone-easy-listening and endless reunions, New Brigade is a reminder of how powerful a noisy, new band with something to prove can sound. The kids maintain an unrelenting intensity throughout the album’s 12 songs."

Pitchfork placed the album at number 37 on its list of the top 50 albums of 2011,

== Accolades ==
Publication	Accolade	Rank	Ref.
The A.V. Club	The Best Music of 2011	21	
BBC Music	Top 25 Albums of 2011	10	
DIY	Albums of 2011	45	
The Guardian	The Best Albums of 2011	50	
The Line of Best Fit	The Best Fit Fifty: Albums of 2011	43	
New York	The Year in Pop (Top 10 Albums)	6	
NME	50 Best Albums Of 2011	36	
Old Waver	Top 50 Albums of 2011	50	
Pitchfork	Top 50 Albums of 2011	37	
Pretty Much Amazing	40 Best Albums of 2011	35	
Spin	50 Best Albums of 2011	23	
Stereogum	Top 50 Albums of 2011	19	
Treble	Top 50 Albums of 2011	26	
Uncut	Top 50 Albums of 2011	46	
Uncut	Top 50 Albums of 2011 (One Year On)	29	

== Track listing ==
All tracks are written by Iceage, except where noted.

No.	Title	Writer(s)	Length
1.	"Intro"		0:48
2.	"White Rune"	Iceage; Loke Rahbek	2:41
3.	"New Brigade"		2:15
4.	"Remember"		2:14
5.	"Rotting Heights"		1:39
6.	"Total Drench"		1:39
7.	"Broken Bone"		2:30
8.	"Collapse"		2:11
9.	"Eyes"		2:03
10.	"Count Me In"	Sexdrome	1:17
11.	"Never Return"		3:09
12.	"You're Blessed"		1:55
Total length:			24:09

== Personnel ==
Iceage

- Elias Bender Rønnenfelt – vocals, guitar
- Johan Surrballe Wieth – guitar
- Jakob Tvilling Pless – bass
- Dan Kjær Nielsen – drums

Technical personnel

- Jens Benz – engineering, mixing
- Nis Bysted – mixing
- Iceage – mastering, mixing
- Alberte Karrebæk – photography
- Peter Schneidermann – mastering
