= Lucre (EP) =

EP by Dean Blunt, Elias Rønnenfelt, and Vegyn
- Released: 1 January 2025
- Genre: Experimental
- Length: 15:58
- Label: World Music

Dean Blunt chronology
Backstage Raver (2024)	Lucre (2025)

Lucre is an extended play (EP) by British musician Dean Blunt, Danish vocalist and Iceage member Elias Rønnenfelt, and British producer Vegyn. It was initially released in full on YouTube on 1 January 2025, and later released on streaming platforms on 7 February 2025. The EP features seven tracks, with each being titled numerically.

Dean Blunt and Rønnenfelt previously collaborated on 2023 single "Smile Please" and the track "Repeat Offenders" on Blunt's 2024 album Backstage Raver.

== Critical reception ==
Samuel Hyland, writing for Pitchfork, gave Lucre a rating of 7.5 out of 10, describing the music "as a soundtrack for trying to remember a dream about your crush". Jordan Darville of The Fader characterized the EP as being more "revitalized by a production that scans more keenly" as a project that "turns its eye more firmly towards the last few decades of British indie music". Bonnibel Lilith Rampertab of the University of Connecticut's The Daily Campus gave the project a 4 out of 5 star rating, describing it "a flourishing proof of concept", adding that the "instrumentation is polished and extremely satisfying to listen to".

== Track listing ==
No.	Title	Length
1.	"1"	1:29
2.	"2"	2:09
3.	"3"	2:19
4.	"4"	2:59
5.	"5"	2:00
6.	"6"	1:32
7.	"7"	3:27
Total length:		15:58
