= You're Nothing =

Studio album by Iceage
- Released: 19 February 2013
- Recorded: May 2012
- Genre: Hardcore punk; punk rock; garage rock
- Length: 28:30
- Label: Matador
- Producer: Iceage; Nis Bysted

Iceage chronology
New Brigade (2011)	You're Nothing (2013)	Plowing Into the Field of Love (2014)

You're Nothing is the second studio album by Danish punk rock band Iceage. The album was released through Matador Records on 19 February 2013. Like its predecessor, New Brigade, the album was met with critical acclaim.

== Critical reception ==
Professional ratings
Aggregate scores
Source	Rating
AnyDecentMusic?	7.7/10
Metacritic	80/100
Review scores
Source	Rating
AllMusic	4/5 stars
The A.V. Club	B
Entertainment Weekly	B+
The Guardian	2/5 stars
Los Angeles Times	3/4 stars
NME	9/10
Pitchfork	8.6/10
Q	4/5 stars
Rolling Stone	3.5/5 stars
Spin	8/10

You're Nothing was well received by critics upon release. At Metacritic, which assigns a normalized rating out of 100 to reviews from mainstream critics, the album has received an average score of 80, based on 41 reviews, indicating "generally favorable". Brandon Stosuy of Pitchfork gave the album a "Best New Music" designation, saying that "Iceage write brilliant songs; on You're Nothing, they've found a way to clarify these compositional skills without stripping away their power."

Fred Thomas, writing for AllMusic, also praised the album and the group's musical evolution, writing, "By the time the title track rolls around to close the album, Iceage have developed a record reaching out in many directions without straining to make any points."

== Track listing ==
All tracks are written by Iceage

No.	Title	Length
1.	"Ecstasy"	2:29
2.	"Coalition"	2:03
3.	"Interlude"	1:44
4.	"Burning Hand"	3:22
5.	"In Haze"	3:01
6.	"Morals"	3:21
7.	"Everything Drifts"	2:41
8.	"Wounded Hearts"	2:29
9.	"It Might Hit First"	1:22
10.	"Rodfæstet"	1:45
11.	"Awake"	2:27
12.	"You're Nothing"	1:45
Total length:		28:30
