= Soul on Fire (EP) =

2018 extended play by Dean Blunt

EP by Dean Blunt
- Released: 19 September 2018
- Genre: Experimental
- Length: 16:24
- Label: World Music
- Producer: Dean Blunt

Dean Blunt chronology
Muggy Vol.1 (2018)	Soul on Fire (2018)	Desert Sessions (2018)

Soul on Fire (stylised in lowercase) is an EP (Note: While some sources refer to Soul on Fire as an album, most consider it an EP.) by British musician Dean Blunt, initially released via YouTube and WeTransfer on 19 September 2018. It was released on streaming platforms on 5 October 2018, and on vinyl on 31 May 2023, through Blunt's World Music label.

The EP followed World Music's Muggy Vol.1 compilation album, which was released a month prior. Soul on Fire features guest appearances by ASAP Rocky, POiSON ANNA, and TYSON. It also has uncredited appearances by Jockstrap and Mica Levi.

== Critical reception ==
Andy Beta of Pitchfork gave Soul on Fire a rating of 5.3 out of 10, describing it as "fragmented and unpolished" and as being on the underwhelming side of Blunt's discography.

== Track listing ==
Track order, timings, and titles sourced from Spotify.

No.	Title	Length
1.	"CHANCER" (featuring ASAP Rocky)	1:27
2.	"ORANGE SODA"	1:23
3.	"NBA"	0:56
4.	"CRUSHED"	1:11
5.	"PETTY WAP"	1:18
6.	"WHITE GRRRL WASTED"	1:47
7.	"A/X" (featuring TYSON)	3:01
8.	"CIAO 2001"	1:05
9.	"BEEFA" (featuring POiSON ANNA)	3:01
10.	"SOMALIA PARK"	1:11
Total length:		16:24

=== Notes ===
- "SOMALIA PARK" was not included on the EP until its release on streaming platforms.
