= Iceage =

Danish punk rock band

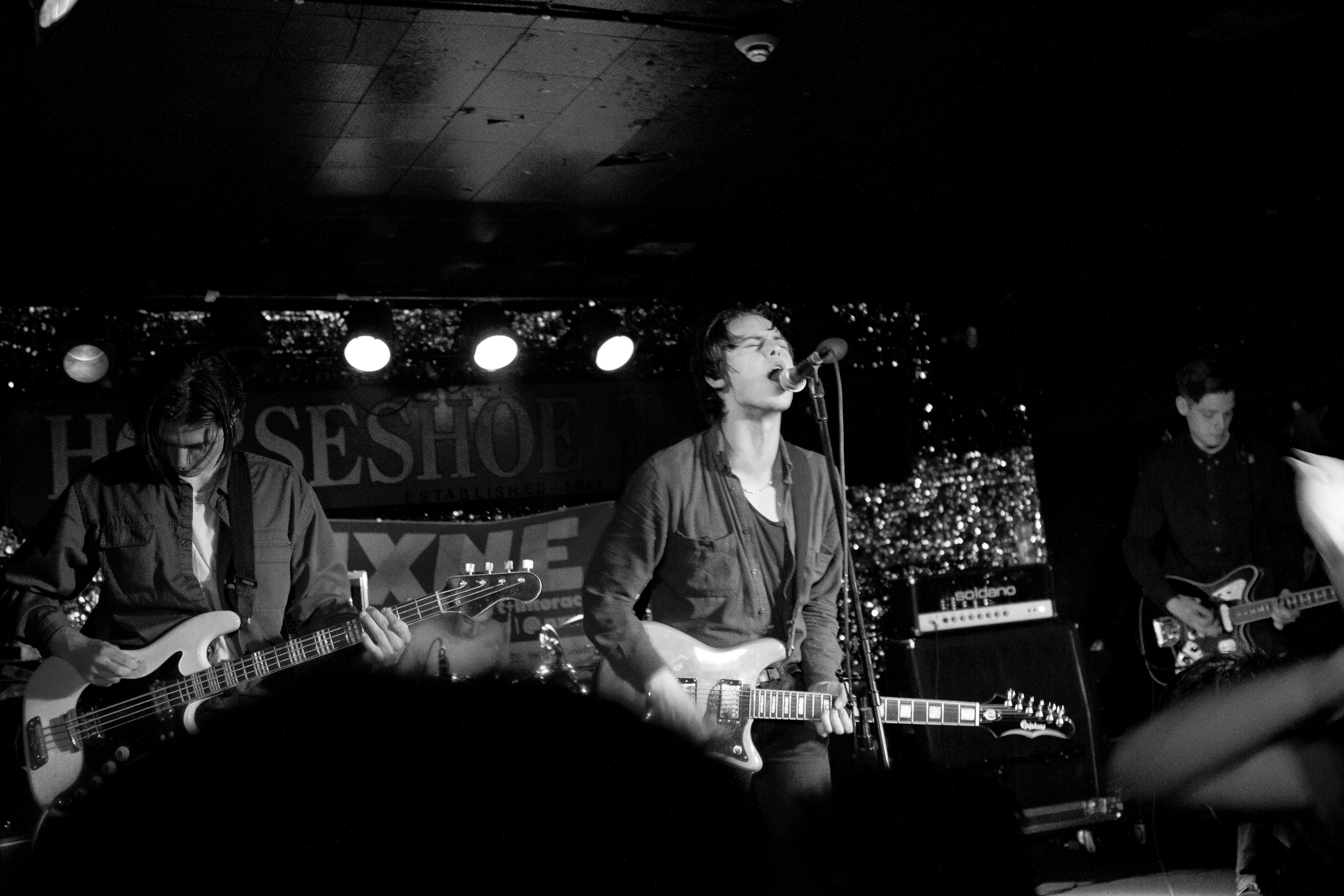
- Iceage performing in Toronto in 2013

Background information
- Origin: Copenhagen, Denmark
- Genres: Post-punk; art punk; noise rock; post-hardcore
- Years active: 2008–present
- Labels: Escho; Posh Isolation; Dais; Big Love; What's Your Rupture?; Tambourhinoceros; Matador; Mexican Summer
- Members: Johan Suurballe Wieth; Dan Kjær Nielsen; Elias Bender Rønnenfelt; Jakob Tvilling Pless; Casper Morilla
- Website: iceage.dk

Iceage is a Danish punk rock band from Copenhagen. The band was formed in 2008 and has released the albums New Brigade (2011), You're Nothing (2013), Plowing Into the Field of Love (2014), Beyondless (2018), Seek Shelter (2021) and For Love of Grace & the Hereafter (2026).

The band's frontman, Elias Bender Rønnenfelt, also released two albums, This World Is Not Enough (2015) and Telling It Like It Is (2016), under the name Marching Church. He released his first solo album, Heavy Glory in 2024 and the collaborative EP Lucre with Dean Blunt in 2025.

== History ==
Iceage were formed in 2008, when the members of the band averaged 17 years old. They signed to Escho to release their debut 7" in 2009 and later on also to Tambourhinoceros in Denmark and Dais Records in the United States. They were then picked up by What's Your Rupture? Records for international release, and their debut album New Brigade was released in January 2011 in Denmark and on 21 June 2011, in the US.

In February 2013, Iceage released their second studio album, You're Nothing, after signing with the independent record label Matador Records. It earned a four star rating (out of five) from Allmusic and four-and-a-half stars out of five from Humo.

Iceage's third studio album, Plowing Into the Field of Love, was released in October 2014 by Matador. The album marked a shift for the band, moving away from their hardcore punk roots and embracing a broader sonic pallet, as well as influences like Nick Cave and Leonard Cohen. All three albums received a nomination for IMPALA's European Independent Album of the Year Award. Iceage released their fourth album, Beyondless, on 4 May 2018 through Matador.

On 7 May 2021, Iceage released their fifth album Seek Shelter. It was their first album working with an outside producer (Sonic Boom of Spacemen 3), and their first album to feature guitarist Casper Morilla, who joined the band in 2019.

Their sixth album For Love of Grace & the Hereafter was released on 29 May 2026.

== Band members ==
- Elias Bender Rønnenfelt – vocals, guitar (born 24 March 1992)
- Johan Suurballe Wieth – guitar, backing vocals (born 13 September 1991)
- Jakob Tvilling Pless – bass (born 10 November 1992)
- Dan Kjær Nielsen – drums (born 11 October 1991)
- Casper Morilla – guitar (born 31 March 1985), joined in 2019

== Discography ==
Studio albums

- New Brigade (2011)
- You're Nothing (2013)
- Plowing Into the Field of Love (2014)
- Beyondless (2018)
- Seek Shelter (2021)
- For Love of Grace & the Hereafter (2026)

Live albums

- Coalition (2011)
- Live, April Fools Day (2014)
- Live 2014 (2015)

Compilations

- Shake The Feeling: Outtakes & Rarities 2015-2021 (2022)

Extended plays

- Iceage (2009)
- Lower / Iceage (2013; split)
- To the Comrades (2013)

Singles

- "New Brigade" (2010)
- "Broken Bone" (2011)
- "White Rune" (2011)
- "Ecstasy" (2013)
- "Wounded Hearts" (2013)
- "The Lord's Favorite" (2014)
- "Catch It" (2018)
- "Pain Killer" (2018)
- "Take It All" (2018)
- "The Day the Music Dies" (2018)
- "Hurrah" (2018)
- "Lockdown Blues" (2020)
- "The Holding Hand" (2021)
- "Vendetta" (2021)
- "Pull Up" (2022)
- "All the Junk on the Outskirts" (2022)
- "Shake the Feeling" (2022)
- "Star" (2026)
- "Ember" (2026)
- "The Weak" (2026)
