= Hype Williams (band) =

British band

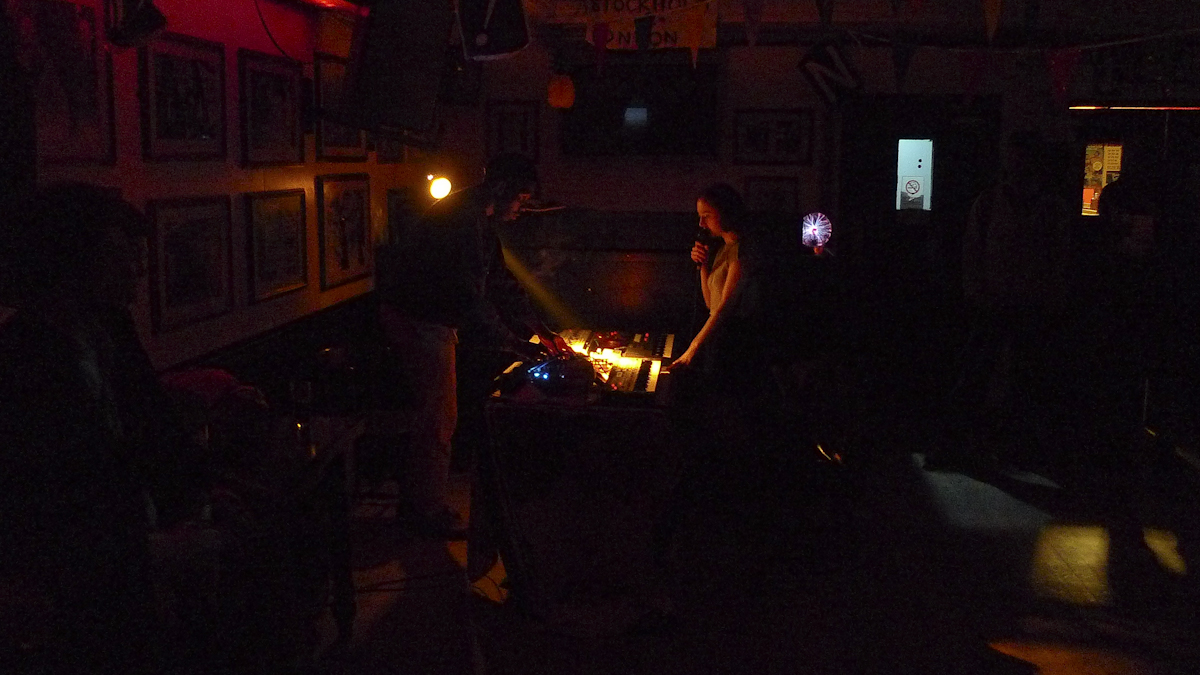
- Hype Williams (Dean Blunt & Inga Copeland) performing in 2010

Background information
- Origin: London/Berlin
- Genres: Experimental; hypnagogic pop
- Years active: 2005 (allegedly)–present
- Labels: World Music; Big Dada; Hippos in Tanks; Hyperdub; De Stijl; Carnivals
- Members: Denna Frances Glass; Slaughter; Silvermane
- Past members: Dean Blunt; Inga Copeland; Arch M

Hype Williams is a music and art group best known for consisting of UK-born artist Dean Blunt and Russian-Estonian artist Inga Copeland (aka Lolina) between 2007 and 2012. Supposedly founded in 2005 as a "relay" project passed between artists every five years, the group has given few interviews, leaving music journalists and the media in doubt as to the exact nature of the project.

== Background, style and career ==
The group's work encompasses widely experimental music releases marked by a lo-fi sound, including their 2011 album One Nation on Hippos in Tanks, and distinctive video pieces, including the defunct YouTube channel pollyjacobsen, which featured a bizarrely cryptic range of content. Their work has drawn irreverently on popular culture and incorporated opaque imagery and contexts, as well as an idiosyncratic online presence. In 2011, they were signed to Hyperdub.

The group's lineup has remained obscure, although Blunt's artistic style has been heard within newer releases, and a variety of other names have also been invoked as members. A mysterious representative named Denna Frances Glass has alternately been posited as either the manager of the project or a fake identity created by Blunt and Copeland. In 2016, Glass announced that Blunt and Copeland were no longer part of the project, which would be continuing with other members. From 2016 onward, the project was headed by two men known by Slaughter and Silvermane. In 2020, Blunt would become involved in the project again when he would sign the group to his World Music label.

== Discography ==
- Han Dynasty (2009, De Stijl)
- Improv (2009, self-released) (with Bo Khat Eternal Troof Family Band)
- Infinity (2010, self-released) (with Bo Khat Eternal Troof Family Band)
- Untitled (2010, Carnival)
- Find Out What Happens When People Stop Being Polite And Start Gettin Reel (2010, De Stijl)
- One Nation (2011, Hippos in Tanks)
- Kelly Price W8 Gain Vol II (2011, Hyperdub)
- London 2012 (2012, self-released)
- 10 / 10 (2016, self-released)
- Guccistreams 2 (2017, self-released)
- Chalice (2017, self-released)
- Rainbow Edition (2017, Big Dada)
- L's (2020, World Music)
