= One Nation (album) =

Studio album by Hype Williams
- Released: 14 March 2011
- Genre: Hypnagogic pop; electro-dub
- Length: 44:14
- Label: Hippos in Tanks

Hype Williams chronology
Find Out What Happens When People Stop Being Polite, and Start Gettin' Reel (2011)	One Nation (2011)	The Attitude Era (2012)

One Nation is an album by British musical duo Hype Williams. It was released on 14 March 2011 through Hippos in Tanks record label.

== Composition ==
The Guardian describes the record's sound as “all woozy basslines, stuttering tempos and glacial washes of synths that feel like a hollowing out of several narrative strands in pop history." Self-Titled Mag called One Nation "as blunted as hypnagogic pop gets." Pitchfork critic Paul Thompson wrote: "At its best, One Nation sounds like a beat tape left to crackle for a decade in somebody's garage. [...] a spacious, hazy, hip-hop-influenced electronic dub." It has been compared to the works of Daniel Lopatin, Ariel Pink, and Boards of Canada, and has been characterized as drawing influences from G-funk, synthpop, horror movie soundtracks, classic R&B and Chicago house. The album also features spoken word fragments

== Critical reception ==
Professional ratings
Aggregate scores
Source	Rating
Metacritic	70/100
Review scores
Source	Rating
Drowned in Sound	7/10
The Guardian	4/5 stars
NME	3/5 stars
Pitchfork	6.4/10

At Metacritic, which assigns a normalized rating out of 100 to reviews from critics, the album received an average score of 70, which indicates "generally favorable reviews", based on 8 reviews. Drowned in Sound critic Noel Gardner described Hype Williams as "a brace of obnoxious, always-switched-on jokers whose music has actual depth and beauty, as much as their M.O. might try to disguise it." Gardner further commented: "If you had to single out something as being symbolic of 2011, you could do a lot worse than this album." The Guardian's Caspar Llewellyn Smith stated: "And while, for some, two spoken-word tracks – Untitled and Untitled (And Your Batty's So Round) – may bring to mind nothing so much as Baz Luhrmann's Everybody's Free (To Wear Sunscreen), others may find it all strangely addictive." Tim Chester of NME thought that the record lacks cohesion and "the songwriting spark of Ariel Pink", eventually writing: "Like making a time capsule and filling it full of junk, '‘One Nation''s oddball ephemera might seem more intriguing to good citizens of the future than it does to us."

== Track listing ==
1. "Ital" – 3:14
2. "Untitled" – 2:28
3. "William, Shotgun Sprayer" – 4:30
4. "Businessline" – 3:37
5. "Warlord" – 4:57
6. "Dragon Stout" – 1:04
7. "Homegrown" – 1:41
8. "Your Girl Smells Chung When She Wears Dior" – 2:12
9. "Unfaithful" – 1:40
10. "Mitsubishi" – 7:48
11. "Jah" – 3:17
12. "Break4love" – 3:04
13. "Untitled (And Your Batty's So Round)" – 4:42
