= Lolina =

Estonian electronic musician and singer

- Lolina performing live 2018 in Gothenburg, Sweden

Background information
- Born: Alina Astrova; Samara, Russia
- Origin: Tallinn, Estonia
- Occupations: Singer; musician
- Labels: Hyperdub; Deathbomb Arc; Relaxin Records

Alina Astrova, better known by the recording aliases Lolina and Inga Copeland, is a Russian-Estonian experimental musician and singer living in London. In addition to her solo work, she collaborated with British musician Dean Blunt on various releases, including several albums as the duo Hype Williams from 2009 to 2012.

== Life and work ==
Astrova was born in Samara, Russia. Her family moved to Tallinn, Estonia when she was a child. At 17, she moved to London to study art criticism at Central Saint Martins College of Art and Design.

From 2007 to 2016, Astrova served as the vocalist for the avant-garde duo Hype Williams alongside Dean Blunt. The pair also released music as "Dean Blunt and Inga Copeland".

In 2024, Astrova was featured on Astrid Sonne's first remix album Great Doubt EDITS, being on the song Almost.

== Discography ==
=== Solo ===
==== As Inga Copeland ====
- Inga Copeland (EP) (2011)
- Don't Look Back, That's Not Where You're Going (EP) (2013)
- Higher Powers (LP) (2013)

==== As Copeland ====
- Smitten (Single) (2014)
- Because I'm Worth It (LP) (2014)

==== As Lolina ====
- Relaxin' with Lolina (EP) (2015)
- Live In Paris (LP) (2016)
- Lolita (EP) (2017)
- The Smoke (LP) (2018)
- Live in Geneva (LP) (2019)
- Who is experimental music? (LP) (2019)
- Fast Fashion (LP) (2021)
- Music Is The Drug (Single) (2022)
- Face The Music (LP) (2022)
- Unrecognisable (LP) (2024)
- gg ep (EP) (2025)
- Monopoly of Mistakes (LP) (2026)

=== With Dean Blunt ===
- Black Is Beautiful (LP) (Hyperdub, 2012)
- The Attitude Era (LP) (2012)
