= Beyondless =

Studio album by Iceage
- Released: 4 May 2018
- Studios: Kungsten Studios; Gothenburg, Sweden
- Genres: Post-punk; art punk; art rock; jazz punk
- Length: 40:54
- Label: Matador
- Producers: Nis Bysted; Iceage

Iceage chronology
Plowing Into the Field of Love (2014)	Beyondless (2018)	Seek Shelter (2021)

Singles from Beyondless
- 1. "Catch It" Released: 12 February 2018; 2. "Pain Killer" Released: 1 March 2018; 3. "Take It All" Released: 22 March 2018; 4. "The Day the Music Dies" Released: 18 April 2018; 5. "Hurrah" Released: 4 May 2018

Beyondless is the fourth studio album by Danish punk rock band Iceage. The album was released through Matador on 4 May 2018.

== Background ==
The first single for Beyondless, "Catch It", was released on 12 February 2018. The single was given the Best New Track acclaim from Pitchfork. Sasha Geffen praised the song for its complexity and unpredictability, saying that when it "slows to a false ending and then spins back up into a raucous, unhinged instrumental climax, it only makes his come-on sound like it could double as a threat." With the release of the single, the band announced tour dates for the Summer of 2018.

On 1 March 2018, Iceage released their second single, "Pain Killer" which featured backing vocals from Sky Ferreira. With the release of the single, Iceage announced further details on their fourth studio album, including the full track list, and the name of the album. The track has been described as a jazz-influenced track due to its backing horns and percussion. In an endearing review, Evan Rytlewski of Pitchfork described the track as morose, and praised Ferreira's backing vocals.

Three weeks later, their third single "Take It All" was released. The track was described by Laurence Day of The Line of Best Fit as "sprawling". Ryan Leas of Stereogum gave the track a rave review, claiming it to be the best single of the album. Leas called "Take It All" an "enigmatic piece, with an atmosphere that unfolds gradually and changes within a single moment, managing to come across as haunting, angered, and a darkly pretty reverie simultaneously." In a positive review, Ben Kaye of the Consequence of Sound called the track "lush" and that the brooding singing of Elias Bender Rønnenfelt and the proceeding percussion made the track unique. Ryan Reed of the Rolling Stone gave high remarks to the violin appearance by Nils Gröndahl. Robin Murray of Clash magazine praised the lyricism of the track.

The fourth single released prior to the album releasing was "The Day the Music Dies", which was released on 18 April 2018. Lauren O'Neill of Noisey and subsidiary of Vice magazine, described the track as "driving, rhythmic, and direct". O'Neill also felt that Elias Rønnenfelt's lyricism was "poetic" and "on prime form". Lizzie Manno of Paste magazine felt the track was anxious and restless.

== Critical reception ==
Professional ratings
Aggregate scores
Source	Rating
AnyDecentMusic?	8.0/10
Metacritic	83/100
Review scores
Source	Rating
AllMusic	4.5/5 stars
The A.V. Club	B
DIY	4/5 stars
The Irish Times	4/5 stars
Mojo	3/5 stars
NME	4/5 stars
The Observer	4/5 stars
Pitchfork	8.6/10
Q	4/5 stars
Uncut	8/10

Beyondless received critical acclaim upon its release. At Metacritic, which assigns a normalized rating out of 100 to reviews from mainstream publications, the album received an average score of 83, based on 24 reviews, indicating "universal acclaim".

=== Accolades ===
Publication	Country	Accolade	Year	Rank
Paste	US	The 50 Best Albums of 2018	2018	24
Pitchfork	US	The 200 Best Albums of the 2010s	2019	187

== Track listing ==
All lyrics are written by Elias Bender Rønnenfelt; all music is composed by Iceage.

No.	Title	Length
1.	"Hurrah"	4:15
2.	"Pain Killer" (featuring Sky Ferreira)	3:39
3.	"Under the Sun"	4:31
4.	"The Day the Music Dies"	3:48
5.	"Plead the Fifth"	3:11
6.	"Catch It"	5:46
7.	"Thieves Like Us"	3:50
8.	"Take It All"	3:50
9.	"Showtime"	4:06
10.	"Beyondless"	4:02
Total length:		40:54

Japanese edition
No.	Title	Length
11.	"Broken Hours"	4:44
Total length:		45:38

== Personnel ==
Credits adapted from AllMusic.

- Nis Bysted – engineer, producer
- Randall Dunn – mixing
- Axel Encke – booklet
- Sille Bræmer Enke – marbles
- Sky Ferreira – vocals
- Christian Friedländer – band photo
- Mattias Glavå – engineer
- Lars Greve – saxophone
- Nils Gröndahl – violin
- Iceage – design, vocals, composer, producer
- Morten Jessen – trombone
- Tom Larsson – assistant engineer
- Dan Kjaer Nielsen – composer
- Jakob Tvilling Pless – composer
- Jens Ramon – engineer
- Elias Bender Rønnenfelt – composer
- Inger Ronnenfelt – photography
- Nis Sigurdsson – design
- Kasper Tranberg – trumpet
- Johan Suurballe Wieth – composer

== Charts ==
Chart (2018)	Peak position
Belgian Albums (Ultratop Flanders)	137
US Heatseekers Albums (Billboard)	4
US Independent Albums (Billboard)	27
