= Tiny Mix Tapes =

Online music and film magazine

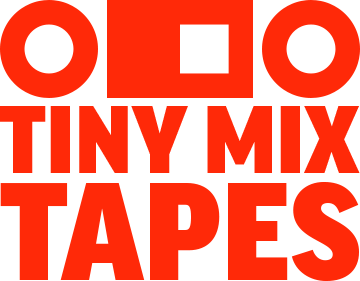
- Website type: Music webzine
- Owner: Mr. P
- Creator: Mr. P
- Website: tinymixtapes.com
- Registration: No
- Launched: 2001-04-16
- Current status: Indefinite hiatus

Tiny Mix Tapes (also TMT or tinymixtapes) was an online music and film webzine that focused primarily on new music and related news. In addition to its reviews, it was noted for its subversive, political, and sometimes surreal news, as well as a podcast and its mixtape generator.

== History ==
Originally called Tiny Mixtapes Gone to Heaven and hosted on GeoCities, the webzine moved to its current domain in 2001. Tiny Mix Tapes is a featured reviewer on Metacritic.

The writing staff was composed of volunteers who often use pen names (such as "Wolfman," "Mango Starr," "Chizzly St. Claw," and "Filmore Mescalito Holmes"). Some contributors, like Rebecca Armendariz and Alex Brown, go by their real names. Its cofounder and last editor-in-chief was Minneapolis-resident Marvin Lin (who writes as "Mr. P"). The music reviews, features, news, film, comics, and the "DeLorean", "Cerberus", and "Automatic Mix Tapes" columns are edited by "Jay," "Gumshoe," "Dan Smart," Benjamin Pearson, "Keith Kawaii," "JSpicer," "Trillian," and "Pliny the Elder," respectively.

On January 6, 2020, Tiny Mix Tapes announced it was going on hiatus.

== Content ==
Tiny Mix Tapes offers news, music reviews, movie reviews, and columns. The "DeLorean" section reviews music released before Tiny Mix Tapes began that may no longer be popular, albums that the writer believes are "classic" or influential, or older music that is significant to the writer.

Similarly, "Eureka" consists of reviews highlighted by the site as particularly noteworthy or exciting.

There is also a features section devoted to interviews, articles, festival reviews, as well as a "Live Blog," in which writers review live music shows. In 2009, Tiny Mix Tapes added a "columns" section.

As of 2008, Tiny Mix Tapes started reviewing films and now has a section devoted to it. This section also includes features on filmmakers and other numerous subjects within the medium.

=== The Automatic Mix Tape Generator ===
The Automatic Mix Tape Generator, or AMG, was created to offer two-way communication with the website. Started in 2002, readers may submit a title or the theme for a mixtape, and a group of volunteers (called the "Mix Robots") will compile a track list. Due to the large volume of requests as well as request redundancy, not all requests are filled. The "Mix Robots" produce and submit track lists fulfilling the request as they interpret it. Mixtape track lists are then available on the website. Most of the songs on the mix tapes come from indie or underground bands/musicians. In 2008, Trillian, the AMG editor, was on Talk of the Nation talk radio program to discuss Valentine's Day mixes.

=== Chocolate Grinder ===
At the beginning of 2009, Tiny Mix Tapes began a feature podcast called Chocolate Grinder. Published approximately twice a month, each installment sees a writer collecting ten brand new tracks they want to shed light on and mix it as a continuous stream or download. The tracks are posted for stream or download in a single continuous file with a unique name. Currently, Chocolate Grinder remains a staple of Tiny Mix Tapes' daily media content, which includes videos, music streams, internet premieres, interactive websites, and the like.

=== Benefit compilation ===
In April 2009, the site began selling a benefit compilation CD/LP to benefit the victims of the War in Darfur. It featured 11 exclusive songs.

=== Humor and politics ===
On March 30, 2007, Tiny Mix Tapes announced it was hosting a festival in Minnesota. At this festival, long-since dissolved indie band Neutral Milk Hotel were billed to be "reuniting all over your Cheerios" as the headlining act. Amidst a blog flurry, and articles disputing the legitimacy of the event in Billboard and Prefix, the festival was revealed as an early April Fool's Day joke later the same day.

== Album of the Year ==
| Year | Artist | Album | Top 5 Albums | Source |
|---|---|---|---|---|
| 2007 | Panda Bear | Person Pitch | 2. Radiohead - In Rainbows; 3. Battles - Mirrored; 4. Animal Collective - Strawberry Jam; 5. Deerhunter - Cryptograms | |
| 2008 | Deerhunter | Microcastle / Weird Era Cont. (tie) | 2. Portishead - Third; 3. TV on the Radio - Dear Science; 4. Fleet Foxes - Fleet Foxes; 5. The Music Tapes - Music Tapes for Clouds and Tornadoes | |
| 2009 | Animal Collective | Merriweather Post Pavilion | 2. Dirty Projectors - Bitte Orca; 3. Sunn O))) - Monoliths & Dimensions; 4. Oneohtrix Point Never - Zones Without People; 5. Raekwon - Only Built 4 Cuban Linx... Pt. II | |
| 2010 | Zs | New Slaves | 2. Ariel Pink's Haunted Graffiti - Before Today; 3. Swans - My Father Will Guide Me up a Rope to the Sky; 4. Flying Lotus - Cosmogramma; 5. Big Boi - Sir Lucious Left Foot: The Son of Chico Dusty | |
| 2011 | Oneohtrix Point Never | Replica | 2. James Blake - James Blake; 3. Colin Stetson - New History Warfare Vol. 2: Judges; 4. The Caretaker - An Empty Bliss Beyond This World; 5. DJ Diamond - Flight Muzik | |
| 2012 | Scott Walker | Bish Bosch | 2. Dean Blunt & Inga Copeland - Black Is Beautiful; 3. Swans - The Seer; 4. Mount Eerie - Clear Moon / Ocean Roar (tie); 5. Laurel Halo - Quarantine | |
| 2013 | Oneohtrix Point Never | R Plus Seven | 2. Dean Blunt - The Redeemer; 3. Julia Holter - Loud City Song; 4. Pharmakon - Abandon; 5. Kanye West - Yeezus | |
| 2014 | Dean Blunt | Black Metal | 2. Grouper - Ruins; 3. GFOTY - Secret Mix; 4. Scott Walker & Sunn O))) - Soused; 5. 5. Kevin Drumm & Jason Lescalleet - The Abyss | |
| 2015 | Arca | Mutant | 2. Young Thug - Barter 6; 3. James Ferraro - Skid Row; 4. Kendrick Lamar - To Pimp a Butterfly; 5. Oneohtrix Point Never - Garden of Delete | |
| 2016 | Babyfather | "BBF" Hosted by DJ Escrow | 2. Lolina - Live in Paris; 3. Kanye West - The Life of Pablo; 4. Arca - Entrañas; 5. Frank Ocean - Blonde / Endless (tie) | |
| 2017 | Mount Eerie | A Crow Looked at Me | 2. Yves Tumor - Experiencing the Deposit of Faith; 3. Arca - Arca; 4. Charli XCX - Number 1 Angel; 5. Klein - Tommy | |
| 2018 | Sophie | Oil of Every Pearl's Un-Insides | 2. Yves Tumor - Safe in the Hands of Love; 3. Lolina - The Smoke; 4. Charli XCX - Pop 2; 5. Tirzah - Devotion | |

| Decade | Artist | Album | Top 5 Albums | Source |
|---|---|---|---|---|
| 2000s | Radiohead | Kid A | 2. Animal Collective - Sung Tongs; 3. Lightning Bolt - Wonderful Rainbow; 4. Madvillain - Madvillainy; 5. The Microphones - Mount Eerie | |
| 2010s | Chuck Person | Chuck Person's Eccojams Vol. 1 | 2. Dean Blunt & Inga Copeland - Black Is Beautiful; 3. Kanye West - Yeezus; 4. Sophie - Oil of Every Pearl's Un-Insides; 5. DJ Rashad - Just a Taste Vol. 1 | |
