= Dean Blunt =

British musician (born 1984)

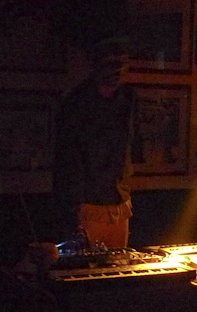
- Blunt performing in 2010 with Hype Williams

Background information
- Also known as: Дин Блант
- Born: Roy Chukwuemeka Nnawuchi; 8 February 1984 (age 42); Hackney, London
- Origin: Hackney, London
- Genres: Art pop; avant-garde; hypnagogic pop; hip-hop
- Occupations: Singer-songwriter; musician; record producer; contemporary artist
- Labels: Hippos in Tanks; Hyperdub; Rough Trade; World Music
- Member of: Babyfather
- Formerly of: Graffiti Island; Hype Williams

Roy Chukwuemeka Nnawuchi (born February 8 1984), known professionally as Dean Blunt, is a Nigerian-British singer-songwriter, musician, producer, and contemporary artist. He is best known for his current solo work as well as his previous work as part of the avant-garde duo Hype Williams (with Inga Copeland) and the hip-hop project Babyfather. Blunt was also the founder of London rock band Graffiti Island. He has been described as "a prolific, category-rejecting artist" and "an art-pop provocateur".

== Early life ==
Although little is known about his personal life, Blunt has said he comes from a family in Hackney, London, that he describes as "Sun readers, working class, kind of ignorant in ways". He is of Igbo descent.

== Music career ==
Blunt performed music with Russian-Estonian artist Inga Copeland (also known as Lolina) as the electronic duo Hype Williams from 2007 until 2012. Supposedly founded in 2005 as a "relay" project passed between artists every five years, the group has given few interviews, leaving music journalists and the media in doubt as to the exact nature of the project. The group's lineup has remained obscure, although Blunt's artistic style has been heard within newer releases, and a variety of other names have also been invoked as members. A mysterious representative named Denna Frances Glass has alternately been posited as either the manager of the project or a fake identity created by Blunt and Copeland. In 2016, Glass announced that Blunt and Copeland were no longer part of the project, which would be continuing with other members.

Blunt embarked on his solo career in 2011, releasing a set of albums as well as several EPs and singles. His first few full-length studio albums, The Narcissist II (2012), The Redeemer (2013), and Black Metal (2014), received attention and praise from various music publications. "BBF" Hosted by DJ Escrow, his first album under experimental group Babyfather, was named the best album of 2016 by Tiny Mix Tapes and Resident Advisor.

Over time, Blunt has frequently collaborated with other artists, such as: Inga Copeland, Joanne Robertson, Elias Rønnenfelt, Panda Bear, Yung Lean, Tirzah, Arca, Mica Levi, A$AP Rocky, Evilgiane, Vegyn, John Glacier, Sauce Walka, POiSON ANNA, and Delroy Edwards.

In 2018, Blunt contributed heavily to A$AP Rocky's album Testing, with production and writing credits on "Purity" and "Gunz N Butter" and additional vocals on "Calldrops". Blunt's work on the album followed collaborative singles between the two artists prior, such as the Babyfather track "Benzo Amore". The pair have since collaborated on multiple recordings.

In 2024, the collaborative album Backstage Raver was released with longtime collaborator Joanne Robertson.

On 1 January 2025, Blunt would release Lucre, a collaborative EP with Iceage lead singer Elias Rønnenfelt and producer Vegyn.

== Other artistic work ==
Blunt has directed music videos for Actress and Panda Bear.

He has produced theatre works including The Narcissist at HAU1 in Berlin in 2012; Lord Knows at Le Romandie in Lausanne in 2013; and I’m Just Passin Thru To Show Some Love in 2013 and Urban in 2014, both at the Institute of Contemporary Arts in London. In October 2017, Blunt also debuted Inna, an opera directed by himself with music from Mica Levi, at the same institute.

Blunt has put on a number of art exhibitions, including Brixton 28s and New Paintings at Space Studios and W44VY at Arcadia Missa. He has also published a book compiling "excessive expenses made in the most popular VIP clubs in the hip hop scene", entitled Cîroc Boyz: Vol 1.

== Personal life ==
Blunt is known for his playfulness and obfuscation. In 2015, he sent his bodyguard to accept his Philip Hall Radar Award at the NME Awards. In 2016, he listed a toy Foxtons estate agents Mini Cooper with a splatter of pink paint filled with marijuana on eBay for £250. At a New York concert in March 2016, media guests were asked to check in under aliases that they had received with their ticket confirmations.

Blunt practices Transcendental Meditation and is a vocal proponent of it.

== Discography ==
=== Solo ===
- Jill Scott Herring OST (EP) (2011)
- The Narcissist (mixtape) (2011)
- The Narcissist II (mixtape) (2012)
- The Redeemer (2013)
- Каменный Остров (Stone Island) (released as Дин Блант) (2013)
- Skin Fade (mixtape) (2014)
- Black Metal (2014)
- Babyfather (mixtape) (2015)
- Muggy Vol.1 (compilation, released under Various Artists) (2018)
- Soul on Fire (EP) (2018)
- Zushi (mixtape) (2019)
- King of R&B (mixtape) (2019)
- Roaches 2012–2019 (compilation) (2020)
- Black Metal 2 (2021)
- Freestyles (SS22) (compilation, EP) (2022)
- Give Me a Moment (EP) (2023)
- 🖤🗑️+4 (EP) (2024)
- Hackney Commercial Waste (compilation) (2024)
- 🔪🩸🖤 (compilation) (2026)

=== As part of Babyfather ===
- UK2UK (mixtape) (2015)
- Platinum Tears (mixtape) (2016)
- "BBF" Hosted by DJ Escrow (2016)
- 419 (mixtape) (2016)
- Cypher (mixtape) (2017)
- "AUG Freestyle / MANNA" (single, with Vegyn & John Glacier) (2020)
- "1471" (single, with Tirzah) (2022)
- "Sleep It Off" (single) (2023)
- "bluey vuitton" (single, with Evilgiane) (2024)
- "teddy boi freestyle" (single) (2024)
- "ƐƐƐƐƐ" (single) (2025)
- ICL (EP) (2026)
- "big farma" (single) (2026)
- "Botched" (single) (2026)

=== Other ===
- The Attitude Era (compilation album of unreleased tracks with Inga Copeland) (2012)
- Black Is Beautiful (with Inga Copeland) (2012)
- Watch the Throne (with James Ferraro) (2012)
- Watch the Throne 2 (with James Ferraro) (2013)
- Hackney vs Brixton (with Gaika) (2016)
- Wahalla (with Joanne Robertson) (2017)
- Hotep (as part of Blue Iverson) (2017)
- Desert Sessions (with Delroy Edwards) (2018)
- BM 2 Kwake Dubs 2021 (remixes and outtakes from Black Metal 2) (2023)
- Backstage Raver (with Joanne Robertson) (2024)
- Lucre (EP) (with Elias B. Rønnenfelt & Vegyn) (2025)

== Awards ==
Year	Organisation	Award	Result
2015	NME Award	Philip Hall Radar Award [Best New Act]	Winner
