= Joanne Robertson (artist) =

British singer-songwriter

- Born: 1979 (age 46–47); Manchester
- Label: AD 93
- Website: joannerobertson.bandcamp.com

Joanne Robertson (born 1979) is an experimental British multidisciplinary artist. She is best known for her collaborations with British avant-garde musician Dean Blunt on albums such as The Redeemer and Black Metal, as well as her 2025 album Blurrr, which was featured on several year-end lists.

Robertson published her first poetry collection with Byron Coley, titled 1971 (A Year in Record Reviews Poems), in 2018.

== Personal life ==
Robertson was born in 1979 in Manchester, and she is currently based in Glasgow after having lived in London. Robertson has one child.

== Style ==
Robertson cites German artist Jutta Koether as a major influence.

She has described her creative process as being improvisation heavy, stating that while at art school she was interested in having ideas come into the work while doing it.

== Discography ==
=== Studio albums ===
Title	Album details
The Lighter	Released: December 25, 2007; Label: Textile Records; Format: Digital download, vinyl
Wildflower	Released: June 22, 2016; Label: Escho; Format: Digital download, vinyl
Wahalla	Collaboration album with Dean Blunt; Released: May 8, 2017; Label: World Music, Textile Records (Vinyl); Format: Digital download, vinyl
Blue Car	Released: March 10, 2023; Label: AD93; Format: Digital download, vinyl
Backstage Raver	Released: May 27, 2024; Label: World Music; Format: Digital download, vinyl
Blurrr	Released: September 19, 2025; Label: AD93; Format: Digital download, vinyl

=== EPs ===
- Painting Stupid Girls (2018)
