= Suki Girlz =

Mixtape by user703918785
- Released: July 2, 2014
- Genre: Trap
- Length: 82:22
- Producer: James Ferraro

User703918785 chronology
NYC, Hell 3:00 AM (2013)	Suki Girlz (2014)	Skid Row (2015)

Suki Girlz is a mixtape by producer James Ferraro, self-released under the moniker user703918785 on SoundCloud on July 2, 2014. The concept of the trap mixtape is symbolized through both its sound and its marketing; all of the tracks are low-quality and borrow tropes common in music self-released on sites like SoundCloud, and it was released with the name user703918785, which spoofs the spambots of these services, thus making it symbolically disposable. It garnered favorable opinions from music journalists, landing at number one on a list of the best mixtapes of 2014 by Pretty Much Amazing.

== Composition and concept ==
Underground music journalist Adam Harper categorized Suki Girlz, as well as Ferraro's album NYC, Hell 3:00 AM (2013), under a style he noticed to have formed the previous few years that he coined as "platinum beats," which is music consisting of sounds that have the feel of an expensive yet depressing metal. Examples include metallophone sounds on the third, fifth and sixteenth tracks of the mixtape, which Harper described as "sounding like chemical drums or rusty oil cans beaten as if seized in an industrial dispute or by the occupants of a polluted area."

Suki Girlz is a trap mixtape that follows the titular and depersonalized SUKI GIRL character, performed by Asian text-to-speech voices, as she views a metropolis consisting of mostly inhuman behavior. The foreign nationality of the voices gives the mixtape's concept of the spreading of luxurious lifestyles around the world; as Harper writes, the Suki Girl talks "about their status and decadent appeals, as if they were talking commodities made bilingual for sale to the travelling business class." Writer Will Neibergall writes that the same "deceptively [...] accessible" sound that was on Ferraro's album Sushi (2012) is present on the mixtape, noting the sound to properly fit the decayed feel of the city it takes place in. He compared the mixtape to the album Ghettoville (2014) by British producer Actress, in that it is "long, minimal, rhythmic, and "difficult" in the sense that it abuses a relatively straightforward medium" and follows a wrecked setting.

All of the tracks have a digitally lo-fi aspect to them, where they only have 196 kilobytes per second and lack any sort of audio mastering. They all contain tropes of music that are common in music that is released on services like SoundCloud, such as low-quality tom sounds, house music synthesizer pads and a trap music style. This all leads to the mixtape being unmemorable in an artistic manner. When viewing the information of each track via iTunes, the artist field is not filled in, and the mixtape was released on SoundCloud under the user703918785 moniker, which is similar to spambot usernames. All of these compositional and release aspects of the mixtape, according to The Quietus reviewer Alexander Iadarola, makes it symbolically disposable and something that should not ever be touched.

== Release and reception ==
Suki Girlz was uploaded to SoundCloud on July 2, 2014 and promoted with an Instagram account titled suki_girl_ that consisted of "typically unsettling 3D rendered face" as Fact magazine described. In a five-out-of-five review for Tiny Mix Tapes, Neibergall called Suki Girlz "just as technically masterful and conceptually subtle as NYC, HELL, if not more complete and focused." He highlighted how it "terrifies without overture, provocation, or pastiche." The mixtape ranked number 37 on the publication's year-end list of best releases; on the list, Nico Callaghan noted that the mixtape's main appeal was its "fascinating emptiness," given that "Ferraro overcame any kind of inflated post-Far Side Virtual cheesiness to craft something so painstakingly deflated and bleak that I was no longer left wondering if he’d pulled my leg." Suki Girlz also topped a list by Pretty Much Amazing of the best mixtapes of 2014.

== Track listing ==
No.	Title	Length
1.	"Suki Girlz 1"	4:54
2.	"Suki Girlz 2"	1:51
3.	"Suki Girlz 3"	2:54
4.	"Suki Girlz 4"	2:41
5.	"Suki Girlz 5"	3:39
6.	"Suki Girlz 6"	5:07
7.	"Suki Girlz 7"	3:49
8.	"Suki Girlz 8"	3:52
9.	"Suki Girlz 9"	3:29
10.	"Suki Girlz 10"	3:22
11.	"Suki Girlz 11"	2:45
12.	"Suki Girlz 12"	3:39
13.	"Suki Girlz 13"	5:02
14.	"Suki Girlz 14"	3:56
15.	"Suki Girlz 15"	2:41
16.	"Suki Girlz 16"	4:21
17.	"Suki Girlz 17"	4:16
18.	"Suki Girlz 18"	3:36
19.	"Suki Girlz 19"	3:29
20.	"Suki Girlz 20"	4:36
21.	"Suki Girlz 21"	7:20
22.	"Suki Girlz 22"	1:03
Total length:		1:22:22

"Suki Girlz 17" contains a sample of "Control (Acapella)", as performed by Janet Jackson.

== Release history ==
Region	Date	Format(s)	Label
Worldwide	July 2, 2014	Digital download; streaming	Self-released
