= Skid Row (James Ferraro album) =

Studio album by James Ferraro
- Released: November 13, 2015
- Genre: Alternative R&B; experimental hip hop; hypnagogic pop
- Length: 56:51
- Label: Break World
- Producer: James Ferraro

James Ferraro chronology
Suki Girlz (2014)	Skid Row (2015)	Human Story 3 (2016)

Singles from Skid Row
- 1. "Skid Row" Released: September 24, 2015

Skid Row is a studio album by American electronic musician James Ferraro, released on November 13, 2015 by Break World Records. Lyrically, it had previously existed as a series of poems before it turned into a set of lyrics for an album named after the crime-and-poverty-heavy Los Angeles area Skid Row. It is the Los Angeles counterpart to Ferraro's previous studio effort NYC, Hell 3:00 AM (2013). Its sound palette includes elements of funk, news reports, new jack swing, film scores, smooth jazz and 1980s rock and hip-hop. The album garnered generally positive reviews upon its release.

== Recording and concept ==
"I remember seeing the Rodney King home video beating on TV. I remember adults being around T.V. talking about it. And I remember there being this sort of energy around it, that this was different to just watching a primetime sitcom or something. There was a little more tension; adults seemed a little more worked up. I remember the visuals too – I was at my grandma's house and there was this huge old wooden T.V. It was just the lexicon for a while. It was something people referenced pretty easily. That's the thing about L.A. – it's still referenced in the actual behaviour [of people]. You see the actual shell-shocked nature of what these things have done to L.A. It sheds a light on a certain character of the environment."

— Ferraro recalling his time during the 1992 Los Angeles riots

When James Ferraro was raised in the early 1990s, his mother lived in New York City and his father in Los Angeles. While traveling back and forth to these homes every few years or less, he noticed the difference of trends and cultures that took place in the cities he went through, describing the experience as "like the internet before the internet had really evolved." Skid Row is a follow-up and the Los Angeles equivalent to Ferraro's previous LP NYC, Hell 3:00 AM (2013), a Hippos in Tanks release that was about the unwholesome part of New York City Ferraro saw that was unknown to most of the world and "a surreal psychological sculpture of American decay and confusion" as Ferraro described.

One time, when visiting the University of Southern California to meet a friend, Ferraro was authorized to use the virtual reality therapy software Bravemind, which is normally used by war veterans to re-experience traumatic war events in order to relieve severe symptoms of post-traumatic stress disorder. He described the virtual area he viewed as "lifeless and really void," and it inspired him to create the three-track extended play War (2015) shortly after using the software, around the same time he began writing Skid Row. The experience with Bravemind painted the mood of the album that Ferraro conceived, saying that his Los Angeles experiences felt like a hyperreal war zone or a "psychic battlefield". Skid Row is about the city's relation to how the media dramatizes information about topics like the 1992 Los Angeles riots and the 1994 O. J. Simpson trial. Some parts of Los Angeles he saw are used on the record as metaphors, such as burning Toyota Prius cars, showcasing how consumerism have caused people to ruin climate. The album is interlaced with samples from online shopping commercials, a take on the culture of Silicon Valley according to God Is in the TV.

In the tradition of making most of Ferraro's records where he imagined an album as being a stage play, film or opera, what would later be an album named after the crime-and-poverty-heavy Los Angeles area of Skid Row began as a series of poems named after The Terminator (1984), a film set in Los Angeles. The films Colors (1988) and Boyz n the Hood (1991) were influences throughout the whole writing process when he the turned the poems into album lyrics and changed the name to Skid Row. As Ferraro said, "I kind of see it as if, you know when you go to a movie house, there's Colors and Boyz n the Hood, and then there's Skid Row, this weird B-movie from the time that nobody really saw." Skid Row was the second record in Ferraro's career where he produced in an actual studio.^{[A]} Ferraro said in an interview that "it's cool to be in an actual space that is just dedicated to you crafting this work. You really hone in [sic] on certain things and spend more time being focused." One difference of making Skid Row from his previous releases is that the recording was done first before mixing instead of all at one time.

== Music and sound ==
Skid Row utilizes influences and sound palettes from Los Angeles' music culture, different from NYC, Hell 3:00 AM in the style of "cold and brittle" contemporary R&B. The online magazine God Is in the TV categorized the LP as a vaporwave album due to its use of news snippets overlaid on top of each other, samples of lounge music and smooth jazz, slow track tempos, and 1980s rock and hip-hop samples. A Pitchfork reviewer also noticed more pop hooks in Skid Row than on NYC, Hell 3:00 AM, which suggests that "he might be starting to come to terms with his innate pop talents, or it could just be a new tactic of dispensing hints of traditional pop pleasures into the gloom to keep his audience off balance."

Ferraro's lead singing on Skid Row serve as an internal monologue about the feeling of isolation while in a car, a vehicle that is a big part of the overall lifestyle of Los Angeles. God is in the TV described his voice on the album as a "slowed-down Maxi Jazz" with occasional influences of George Michael on tracks like "Sentinel Beast." Sonic aspects of the album are arranged to represent conflict associated with the city, and cinematic strings are played to enhance the movie-like feeling of the album.

== Release and promotion ==
Professional ratings
Review scores
Source	Rating
God is in the TV	3/5 stars
Pitchfork	6.6/10
Tiny Mix Tapes	4.5/5 marks

On September 24, 2015, Vice Media's electronic music publication THUMP premiered Skid Row's title track, and announced that the album would be released on November 13, 2015 through Break World Records. On November 15, Stereogum premiered the official video for “Thrash & Escalate," which Ferraro directed with Elsa Henderson. The video consists of white silhouettes of angels laid on erratically arranged footage of smog, factories and dark streets.

Reviews of Skid Row were generally positive. A Pitchfork critic described the album as "solidly built cohesive" and "a worthy addition to the long line of punk albums about Los Angeles that render it as a city built on fantasy with a nihilistic streak that runs to its core." A review published in God Is in the TV spotlighted Ferraro's knowledge of Los Angeles which was unusual for a person who usually lives in New York, and described its "metallic" chopped and screwed style as "idiosyncratic". A Tiny Mix Tapes review was put under the site's "EUREKA!" column, a section for albums "so incredible we just can't help but exclaim EUREKA!" The review described the album as "a sad, chaotic, asymmetrical report, but it's honest." Skid Row landed at number three on the publication's list of best albums of 2015.

== Track listing ==
Skid Row
No.	Title	Length
1.	"Burning Prius (for the World)"	1:34
2.	"White Bronco"	4:32
3.	"Pollution"	3:48
4.	"Street Freaks"	4:28
5.	"Million Dollar Man"	1:14
6.	"Thrash & Escalate"	3:14
7.	"Skid Row"	4:32
8.	"To Live and Die in La"	8:33
9.	"Rhinestones"	5:32
10.	"Doctor Hollywood"	6:54
11.	"1992"	4:18
12.	"Sentinel Beast"	4:54
13.	"At the Beach"	3:18
Total length:		56:51

== Release history ==
Region	Date	Format(s)	Label
Worldwide	November 13, 2015	Cassette; CD; digital download; vinyl	Break World

== Notes ==
- A Even though some sources claim Skid Row to be Ferraro's first studio experience, he said in an October 2013 interview with Bomb magazine that with NYC, Hell 3:00 AM, it was the first time he produced in a studio.
