= Night Dolls with Hairspray =

Studio album by James Ferraro
- Released: October 31, 2010
- Genres: Hypnagogic pop; dream pop; bubblegum pop; glam rock; power pop; glam punk
- Length: 48:15
- Label: Olde English Spelling Bee
- Producer: James Ferraro

James Ferraro chronology
On Air (2009)	Night Dolls with Hairspray (2010)	Far Side Virtual (2011)

Night Dolls with Hairspray is a studio album by American electronic musician James Ferraro, released on October 31, 2010 by Olde English Spelling Bee. Described as a "cycle of bubblegum pop songs," its lo-fi sound draws on sources such as 1980s pop culture tropes, B-movies, and glam punk. The album garnered generally favorable reviews from critics, and was called a "weirdo masterpiece of the 21st century" by Impose.

== Composition ==
In an interview, Ferraro claimed he had gotten into "weird street fashion" while recording Night Dolls with Hairspray, which led to the album being influenced by glam rock and power pop styles. Of the record's concept, Ferraro explained: "the idea itself was basically just private material, just fooling around. I was really inspired to try to make just weird B-movie style trash." Many of the songs on Night Dolls with Hairspray feature Ferraro exaggeratedly singing in falsetto, which he claimed was "silly" and "harmless" and made the album sound "cool" and "futuristic".

Pitchfork described the album's overall instrumentation as consisting of "plunging bass lines, warped guitar riffs, and crooning vocals" that "bounce around the stereo space like lasers in a hall of mirrors." A reviewer for Playground magazine described the tracks as "fragmentary songs," in that it feels like each track cuts to different songs; this "collage effect" is an essential part of hypnagogic pop, in that the variety of 1980s musical styles serve as an "exercise in nostalgia".

According to Nick Richardson of Fact magazine, Night Dolls with Hairspray explores the surfaces of popular media in the 1980s; in doing so, Ferraro creates new bad behaviors for scenarios common in B movies of that decade. The song "Leather High School" takes place in a 1980s high school movie situation, but adds a sexual context not normally present in such a movie: "The principal's wearing panties under his suit / They're taking him down to the boiler room / They're going to whip him till he bleeds." "Buffy Honkerburg's Answering Machine" involves the singer as a stalker nerd sending lewd messages to a cheerleader in a slasher film scenario.

Richardson noted that Night Dolls with Hairspray "reflects a fantastical vision of the present that's out of date and crumbling as soon as it's realised – even as the vision hairpins to a blemishless space of muscled, digital geometry." The album features interludes that Richardson described as "disorienting amalgams of gross-out sound effects, shortwave radio noise, advertising jingles and cartoon theme tunes," which all represent the negative by-products of the entertainment community the album mocks. Night Dolls with Hairspray also focuses on how most people positively view an otherwise bad entertainment industry today, where "real teenagers, like Ferraro records, are smelly, acnefied, confused; while Beyonce [sic] is a slick, inhuman cyborg".

== Critical reception ==
Professional ratings
Review scores
Source	Rating
Fact	4/5
Pitchfork	7.9/10
Playground	7.9/10

An Impose magazine journalist called Night Dolls with Hairspray a "weirdo masterpiece of the 21st century." Marc Masters of Pitchfork described it as "remarkably catchy music," writing that fans of artists like Ariel Pink would enjoy the album; he also called it "dizzying" and "nauseating, much the way audiences left The Blair Witch Project more sick from the shaky camerawork than scared by the plot." The Pitchfork blog Altered Zones called Night Dolls with Hairspray a "supremely listenable batch of hits" and "so poignant that it'll leave you wondering how you (actually) chuckled at the roach-infested creeps that populated the album." In a harsher review, Joshua Paul Greene of MVRemix called the album "a painfully lo-fi, endlessly frenetic example of what I consider to be seriously unfulfilled potential." He mainly criticized the editing, more specifically the placement of sounds that ruin the flow of each song that otherwise has "catchy melodies and rhythms", and also chastised most of its songs for ending abruptly.

== Track listing ==
Night Dolls with Hairspray
No.	Title	Length
1.	"Dollhouse Frotteur"	5:10
2.	"Runaway"	6:32
3.	"Brittney's Gum"	3:01
4.	"Leather High School"	5:41
5.	"Buffy Honkerburg's Answering Machine"	3:36
6.	"Lipstick On Ants"	1:51
7.	"Killer Nerd"	5:08
8.	"Roaches Watch TV"	1:29
9.	"Roses And Mystery"	4:31
10.	"Movie Monster"	4:47
11.	"Radio Cherubs"	6:29
Total length:		48:15

== Release history ==
Region	Date	Format(s)	Label
Worldwide	October 31, 2010	Digital download	Olde English Spelling Bee
