= NYC, Hell 3:00 AM =

2013 album by James Ferraro

Studio album by James Ferraro
- Released: October 15, 2013
- Recorded: 2012–13
- Genres: R&B; avant-garde
- Length: 61:36
- Label: Hippos in Tanks
- Producer: James Ferraro

James Ferraro chronology
Cold (2013)	NYC, Hell 3:00 AM (2013)	Suki Girlz (2014)

Singles from NYC, Hell 3:00 AM
- 1. "Eternal Condition/Stuck 2" Released: July 20, 2013

Alternate cover
- CD artwork

Alternate cover
- Digital artwork

NYC, Hell 3:00 AM is a studio album by American musician James Ferraro, released digitally and physically on October 15, 2013 by the label Hippos in Tanks. The album, stylistically exploring a combination of R&B and avant-garde music, was Ferraro's first album recorded with studio instrumentation. It began as a conceptual project, described by Ferraro as "a surreal psychological sculpture of American decay and confusion", for him to only record at or around midnight, and the album's material was "realized" instead of structured and planned out.

NYC, Hell 3:00 AM explores themes of decadent aspects of life in New York City that are otherwise not propagated to the rest of the world, but is also "a statement about [Ferraro's] emotional hell", and it is "about [his] demons just as much as it's about society's demons". Its sound palette incorporates "monastic" instrumentation including moody string sections, glockenspiels and bells, as well as samples from news broadcasts, heavily processed and distorted sound design, text-to-speech voices, and what reviewer Reed Scott Reid writing for Tiny Mix Tapes described as "non-sequitur streetlife collage". It also incorporates Ferraro's own singing voice and ambiguous mumbled lyrics with a somber presentation. Music journalists wrote favorable reviews of NYC, Hell 3:00 AM upon its release, and the album appeared on year-end lists of publications such as Vice magazine, Chart Attack and The Wire; common major praises were toward its unique concept and the way it presented it, while more mixed reviews criticized the overall presentation, the off-kilter sound palette, and the quality of Ferraro's singing.

== Recording and concept ==
The writing and recording of what would later be titled NYC, Hell 3:00 AM started in the fall of 2012 only as a ritualistic project for Ferraro to record exclusively during midnight hours. At the time, he had only vaguely planned it as an imaginary soundtrack to a sex tape; one of the songs that came out of the original concept which appears on the album is "Cheek Bones", described by Ferraro as a "dark love song" regarding young people who try to have sexual intercourse in the same way actors and actress in films do for more satisfaction, as well as people's gratification from seeing emaciated bodies and their bodily anxieties. When the production of the album was near completion, he realized the album could incorporate greater themes, especially his experience of New York City, saying that "it was just inherent within these recordings that I was making. But it was pretty blind. At the end, it sort of revealed itself to me without me setting out and doing it." This process was very different from the making of his past releases, where it was more controlled with the main idea already planned. It also departed from the making of Ferraro's past works because it was the first time Ferraro recorded in an actual studio; he said that he "really enjoyed that experience of having a space to create in."

Some of the lyrics for the record were taken from a 20-page poem Ferraro wrote after going to a fashion party on a night circa 2011, while other lyrics were improvised. For Ferraro, the title of each track was a crucial part of NYC, Hell 3:00 AM. For instance, the song "Nushawn" is named after Nushawn Williams, who spread AIDS to several women in the 1990s: "as a kid I remember being like, 'Damn... that's like a new type of serial killer.' That always resonated with me and went on as a memory of New York as a kid." The title of "Beautiful Jon K." refers to Basque model Jon Kortajarena, who Ferraro felt symbolized one of the album's major concepts of unrealistic and electronically created idea of beauty, and felt near-romantic empathy towards: "I thought about him as being a supermodel that was facing this hideous fucked up thing about his face. You see people caught up in that – developing a whole language of their own."

NYC, Hell 3:00 AM is based around the unwholesome and decadent part of New York City Ferraro saw as unknown to most of the world, and was described by him as "a surreal psychological sculpture of American decay and confusion." The 3:00 AM part of the record's title is the hour of when each night of recording the album began, and according to Ferraro, this made the LP a "snapshot" of New York City when "the hedonism kind of spills out." The parts of the city Ferraro saw and knew about that inspired the record include the violence in Brooklyn, the crack and heroin-selling areas in Chinatown, Manhattan and The Sun Bright Hotel where news reports have accredited it to keeping guests in cages, as well as, in Ferraro's words, "rats, metal landscape, toxic water, junkie friends, HIV billboards, evil news, luxury and unbound wealth, exclusivity, facelifts, romance, insane police presence [and] lonely people... all against the sinister vastness of Manhattan's alienating skyline."

=== Philosophy ===
One of the forces behind the creation of NYC, Hell 3:00 AM was "a mental stuck", which parallels the content of the interludes of the same name featured on the album; it also considers the world as a constantly changing but "completely fixed thing". In an interview with Miles Bowe for Stereogum, Ferraro said:

I feel like we’re in this giant traffic jam. Like you’ll be trapped on the train and try to escape into your phone but you get no bars and it’s just... stuck. There’s nowhere to go. You have to embrace that moment when you’re stuck with everybody. Everything’s congested — the economy, everything is oversaturated and there’s no mobility. That’s the mental space of thinking of something as global as New York or as global as the economy — sometimes it’s a weird checkmate logic. For someone who is not an economist and trying to think about it, you get into this sort of congested rationality. Some people like really sadistic businessmen can work in that mindset and thrive in it.

Ferraro also remarked that French philosopher Michel Foucault had been an inspiration, saying he was "one thinker I always came back to".

Reed Scott Reid's review of NYC, Hell 3:00 AM for Tiny Mix Tapes expresses similar ideas concerning the cultural value of the music that inspired the album: introducing the review with a quote from Jean Baudrillard's Cool Memories that relates his experience at a Stevie Wonder concert to a "strictly regulated release", Reid went on to say that "afro-diasporic pop culture conceals not a quantization of truth (groove as the soul in motion; humanity as a pattern of similarity), but a radical equivalence between the two processes, the expressive and the imprecise swelling behind the lattice of a timing grid." In the review, he also makes a "corollary speculation" that ties the album's use of rhythm and city imagery to the fixity of Ferraro's idea of a stuck world, stating that "[p]erhaps rhythm does not belong to the foundations of the city. Perhaps the measure of motion is a senseless byproduct of urban performance and exchange. Perhaps rhythm is not a sentence to be sworn, its invocation requiring the acquisition of knowledge and technical mastery, but a crisis to be managed, an ecological condition that needs to be supervised, regulated, and contained."

== Music and sound ==
Alongside its use of orchestral sounds, NYC, Hell 3:00 AM utilizes a range of digital sound design to represent the jarring contrast between frantic nightlife and emotionally flat technology, including conveniences like self-checkouts and ATMs. Cut up samples of news broadcasts, such as those about topics like the September 11 attacks in "City Smells" and "Stuck 2", show how mass media during crises will often use images from surveillance footage and news stations to determine how a crime or event occurred, often to compulsively fixate on a part of the crime or event in retrospect instead of the full story. While Ferraro sings on most of the album, text-to-speech voices are also present, such as the opening of the album where the word "Money" is repeated multiple times by a text-to-speech voice, which establishes a feeling of alienation and a neurotic personality; Pitchfork's Miles Raymer described it as sounding "like the flattened affect of a person in the midst of a psychotic break." Underground music journalist Adam Harper described the feel of NYC, Hell 3:00 AM as dragging the listener "down like a ghoul on [their] back and a concrete block chained to [their] legs" without any ability to understand a recurring theme. He called the record "a mystery you feel pressing you down before you comprehend it, resigning you to truths that are greater and more modern than mimicry, something you can pour yourself into." He compared the record's combination of a depressed state of mind and a luxurious and affluent yet devastated social environment to that of the works of Kanye West, Drake, Dean Blunt and How to Dress Well. As he described the album's overall arrangement, "the speckled, downcast members of Ferraro’s arcane backing band don’t make eye contact with each other or anyone else, but somehow their disunity settles, like silt."

The album also features distinctively used musical samples which demonstrate Ferraro's influences. "Fake Pain" samples vocals from "I Wish It Would Rain" by the Temptations, while the closing track, "Nushawn", samples dialogue from American Psycho and utilizes a pitched down sample from Bernard Herrmann's film score for Taxi Driver.

In the intro to NYC, Hell 3:00 AM, the segment where a female text-to-speech voice repeatedly says "Money" is followed by an accompaniment of string sections and woodwinds; these "monastic" instruments, according to Harper, are present as "troglodytes" in the background throughout the record, showcasing emotions of "sagging, sighing" and "wheezing." As Harper writes, "maybe they’re the beings who have long occupied these caves before, who have long understood these inevitabilities and can sombrely carry our debilitated bodies into the subterranean lake, the old weird religion whose gnarled arms we can fall into." According to Ferraro, NYC, Hell 3:00 AM was initially planned to be much like an orchestral piece, but due to his label "disput[ing]" the album in this state, the record had to be modified for a different style he didn't originally plan. In the forefront of these orchestral sounds are disrepaired metallophone-like sounds that serve as the symbol of artifacts of buildings that were either built a century ago, are unfinished or broken down. They also, as Harper wrote, are "the enervating glockenspiel of helpless immaturity, and the weirdly transfigured, oppressive Big Ben of a New Year's Eve spent on codeine."

NYC, Hell 3:00 AM uses heavily manipulated and distorted samples, often sidechain compressed. As well as this, the occasional pitch-shifting on them through songs on the album reflects conflict in emotion and mood on the album, a compositional technique also used in the works of mutual American electronic musician Oneohtrix Point Never. Some of these sounds, in a similar behavior to that of non-player characters in video games, come together in order to hide each other rather than create a new fresh and tidy landscape, wrote Harper. Other times, Ferraro "isn’t so much creating these sounds as they’re bothering him, eavesdropping on him, hemming him in, and scuttling up next to him. Sometimes they’re scaffolding through which we glimpse him, scraps of gently flapping tarpaulin hanging from it."

== Release and reception ==
Professional ratings
Aggregate scores
Source	Rating
Metacritic	74/100
Review scores
Source	Rating
Dummy Mag	6/10
Fact	2.5/5
HHV	9.2/10
Pitchfork	6.6/10
Tiny Mix Tapes	4.5/5 marks
Uncut	4/5 stars

On July 4, 2013, the first trailer for the record was released, which a Tiny Mix Tapes writer praised as "amazing." The second trailer, which came out on July 17, shows footage of a burning car on the streets. The third trailer premiered on July 31, which played the full-length version of "Upper East Side Pussy" as well as another track off the album which ended up being unused and existing only as an instrumental on the Japanese edition. One single was released from NYC, Hell 3:00 AM, "Eternal Condition/Stuck 2." The song premiered on Stereogum on July 20, 2013. NYC, Hell 3:00 AM was issued for digital retailers and on compact disc on October 15, 2013, by Hippos in Tanks. The label then released the album on vinyl on November 26.

NYC, Hell 3:00 AM garnered mostly positive reviews from music journalists. It was called by a critic for The Wire Ferraro's best release since Far Side Virtual (2011), landing at number 47 on the publication's year-end list. The album ranked number 17 on Tiny Mix Tapes' year-end list, where Nico Callaghan described it as the most "complex evocative experience" in Ferraro's discography: "By stripping back his compositions and shifting his gaze away from eliciting a listener’s response and moving himself to the forefront, Ferraro surprisingly achieved the most visceral and expressive creation in his career so far." It was also number 36 in a top 50 year-end list by Vice, where Gladys Goopinstein humorously described it as "so pants-shittingly terrifying that it sucked all the blood vessels from my face and brain and transported them southward faster than a van’s worth of AR-15s breezing past Mexican customs." It was also discussed in Canadian magazine Chart Attack's article on the "best overlooked and underground electronic music" of 2013, where it was called a "beautiful monument to the digital life that soothes, but never cures, the alienation of living in a big city."

NYC, Hell 3:00 AM was named by Harper to be the "most beautifully and troublingly convincing account of" the part of New York City that's mostly unheard of. The Quietus called NYC, Hell 3:00 AM Ferraro's "most affecting and intoxicating" album, highlighting his "sick skill with illogical hooks" and "uniquely harrowing surrealism" that comes into play on the record. He wrote that the record's focus on a concept outside of the digital atmosphere is what made it "so surprisingly compelling" in comparison to similar works such as Oneohtrix Point Never's R Plus Seven (2013) and Tim Hecker's Virgins (2013). Going as so far as to call it "an actual piece of history," HHV magazine honored the album to be "full of soul" and "we feel it because it’s constantly being threatened." Pitchfork's Miles Raymer recommended NYC, Hell 3:00 AM to those who wanted to have an "extremely rare and powerful, if not exactly fun" experience. He highlighted the album's negative representation of being drugged late at night, which is unique from other contemporary R&B works that would otherwise depict getting high on chemical substances in an attractive manner: "The fact that Ferraro’s able to work in an R&B medium using ugliness as his primary aesthetic says a lot about how real the style’s avant garde is, and about how far they’re willing to push things. It also says a lot about how good things can get if they keep pushing."

In a mixed review, Fact magazine's Steve Shaw wrote that NYC, Hell 3:00 AM had many "genuine highs" in the instrumental department; however, the record felt like a "painful hour" entirely due to Ferraro's "achingly, pitifully bad" vocals, which "have no reason to be there, and only serve to question what Ferraro thinks of his audience." Adam Strohm of Dusted magazine wrote that "the album isn’t without moments of levity, but it’s also not a good time." He was also mixed towards Ferraro's singing, writing that while it wasn't horrible, it wasn't for the type of music that is played on the record: "It puts the album in a particular light, one in which NYC, Hell 3:00 AM is either an awkward misstep or a tongue-in-cheek spoof. [...] either way, this isn’t James Ferraro playing to his strengths." Dummy mainly criticized the album for its message, finding it to be "a little obvious" and "gauche": "Ferraro is known for being way ahead of his peers when it comes to identifying and representing shifts in sound and ideology through his music, but with ‘NYC, Hell 3:00AM’ it's as if he's run out of ideas."

== Track listing ==
NYC, Hell 3:00 AM
No.	Title	Length
1.	"Intro"	2:34
2.	"Fake Pain"	3:19
3.	"Qr Jr"	3:27
4.	"Close Ups"	3:06
5.	"Beautiful Jon K."	4:24
6.	"Stuck 1"	1:29
7.	"City Smells"	5:28
8.	"Upper East Side Pussy"	2:39
9.	"Eternal Condition"	4:11
10.	"Stuck 2"	3:02
11.	"Niggas"	4:56
12.	"Stuck 3 (Rats)"	2:19
13.	"Cheek Bones"	4:45
14.	"Vanity"	5:57
15.	"Irreplaceable"	6:13
16.	"Nushawn"	3:47

NYC, Hell 3:00 AM — Japanese version (bonus tracks)
No.	Title	Length
17.	"N_1"	0:46
18.	"The Escalade" (Instrumental)	2:40
19.	"N_3"	4:22
20.	"N_4"	3:12
21.	"NYC GOD" (Instrumental)	4:48

== Release history ==
Region	Date	Format(s)	Label
Worldwide	October 15, 2013	Digital download; CD	Hippos in Tanks
Worldwide	November 26, 2013	Vinyl	Hippos in Tanks
