= Triad God =

Chinese-Vietnamese rapper

- Born: Vinh Ngan
- Origin: Peckham, London
- Genres: Experimental hip-hop; cloud rap; ambient music
- Occupations: Rapper; singer; record producer; songwriter
- Years active: 2011–present
- Labels: Hippos in Tanks; Presto!?; Triple You Tapes

Vinh Ngan, known professionally as Triad God, is a Chinese-Vietnamese English rapper based in London. His discography blends elements of cloud rap, ambient music and experimental hip hop often featuring Cantonese lyrics. He has frequently collaborated with producer Palmistry and Hippos in Tanks labelmate James Ferraro.

== Early life ==
Vinh Ngan was raised in Peckham, London, and is of Chinese and Vietnamese heritage. Ngan has cited Chinese love songs, rap music, and American rapper Tupac Shakur as influencing his music.

== Career ==
In 2012, Triad God gained a cult following with his debut mixtape NXB, which was initially self-released before receiving a proper rollout on the now-defunct label Hippos in Tanks. The album was described by Pitchfork's Nadine Smith as "a surreal blend of singing, rapping, and voiceover narration".

Triad God has been described as "cloaked in mystery with close to no in-depth interviews and only a few video appearances. He has frequently collaborated with producer Palmistry and Hippos in Tanks labelmate James Ferraro. After the release of NXB, he was "hardly seen or heard", until the release of his second album Triad in 2019 on Lorenzo Senni's record label Presto!?

In 2021, Triad God was credited on the soundtrack to the film Boogie.

== Legacy ==
Rapper Edward Skeletrix cited Triad God's 2019 track "So Pay La" as an influence.

== Discography ==
=== Mixtapes ===
Title	Mixtape details
NXB	Released: 2012; Label: Self-released; Format: Digital download, streaming

=== Studio albums ===
Title	Album details
Triad	Released: 2019; Label: Self-released; Format: Digital download, streaming
