= Sushi (album) =

Studio album by James Ferraro
- Released: November 7, 2012
- Genres: Electronica; dance-pop; UK bass; glitch hop
- Length: 36:01
- Label: Hippos in Tanks
- Producer: James Ferraro

James Ferraro chronology
Inhale C-4 $$$$$ (2011)	Sushi (2012)	Cold (2013)

Singles from Sushi
- 1. "SO N2U" Released: September 24, 2012

Sushi (stylized as SUSHi) is a studio album by the American electronic musician James Ferraro, released on November 7, 2012, by the independent record label Hippos in Tanks. The electronica dance-pop record has a much more mainstream sound than Ferraro's past albums, continuing some of the trap, R&B and hip-hop underpinnings that were a part of Ferraro's two mixtapes Inhale C-4 $$$$$ (2012) and Silica Gel (2012), released under his Bebetune$ and Bodyguard monikers, respectively. Sushi garnered mixed to positive reviews upon its release, a common criticism being its lack of depth or indication of a main concept.

== Composition ==
Described by Dazed magazine as a "modern take in leftfield electronica," Sushi is a dance-pop album that borrows some of the same trap, R&B and hip-hop styles present on Ferraro's previous two mixtapes: Inhale C-4 $$$$$ (2012), released under the Bebetune$ name, and Silica Gel (2012), issued under Bodyguard. Critic Josh Becker wrote that it also combines elements of some of Ferraro's previous releases and creates "dance-friendly" music out of them; for example, “Baby Mitsubishi” and “Jet Skis & Sushi” best showcase Ferraro's interest in consumerism which was also present on Far Side Virtual (2011) and Silica Gel, while “Powder” and “Jump Shot Earth” have chopped and screwed vocal samples similar to those on Night Dolls with Hairspray (2010). He also noted that every song on the album is dominated by a bassline, which was never the case of Ferraro's past works and strongly contributes to Becker's description of Sushi being "dance-friendly." Other genres that are touched upon in Sushi include footwork and house.

== Interpretations ==
Dummy magazine noted that the album's hip-hop and dance influences, as well as track titles like "Power" and "Bootycall," suggest the album could be making fun of club culture. Becker analyzed the record may be about "a clueless white kid's conception of ghetto tropes," as the title of "Bootycall" as well as “Playin Ya Self” and “Condom” would indicate. A No Ripcord reviewer felt the album was titled Sushi because, like actual modern pop music the record replicates, the food sushi are "tiny bite-size chunks of ear-candy, finely and delicately crafted, but consumed quickly and disposably." A reviewer for Dusted magazine described the record's overall instrumentation as consisting of "shuffling beats, bright synth patterns and repetitive melodies."

== Release and promotion ==
A track that would become a part of Sushi's track list, “SO N2U,” was released on September 24, 2012. That same day, it was announced a new album was coming out in November 2012 that was either to be titled Rainstick Fizz Plus or ☣ NEW AGE PLAYBOY ☣. It was then updated that the album would be titled Shoop2DaDoop, before it was announced on October 24, 2012 that the official album title was Sushi. The album first became available via streaming on the official website for Dazed magazine on November 6, 2012. It was then released digitally a day later on the Hippos in Tanks label before being released on vinyl and CD on December 10, 2012.

== Critical reception ==
Professional ratings
Aggregate scores
Source	Rating
AnyDecentMusic?	6.3/10
Metacritic	68/100
Review scores
Source	Rating
Beats Per Minute	59%
Drowned in Sound	6/10
Fact	3.5/5 marks
musicOMH	2/5 stars
No Ripcord	7/10 stars
Pitchfork	7.2/10
Uncut	4/5 stars

Marc Masters, writing for Pitchfork, described Sushi as "well-made, engaging electronic instrumental music, the best of which rivals that of any current producer." He wrote that the album's perky aspect was its charm, in that "the way snippets of voices and smatterings of sound effects add unpredictable humor." His only main criticism was that it was "more entertaining than resonant," though he also wrote that there were parts on the record that "suggest what Ferraro has begun on Sushi could deliver deeper rewards." These parts include a "chiming lope" on the track "Jet Skis & Sushi," which Masters analyzed the song really being about humanity and technology coming together, and the "wavy" and "ponging" sounds on "Bootycall" that give the track a nostalgic vibe. No Ripcord called Sushi "more sophisticated" than Inhale C-4 $$$$$ and Silica Gel, writing that its main appeal is that it "draws from so many strands of contemporary electronic music, but sounds like something else in its own right." Fact magazine noted the album's mainstream hip-hop sound to be an "interesting change of direction, and arguably a good one too," even calling the album weird due to it sounding like an actual, professionally produced release.

More mixed reviews of Sushi were more critical of the album's lack of depth. Becker, who wrote a review for Beats Per Minute, called it "disappointingly mediocre" and only a "more coherent" version of Silica Gel. His main criticism was that the record was very repetitive and lacking either "atmosphere or songcraft," meaning that "it feels like Ferraro had about an EP’s worth of solid, original ideas here upon which he felt either artistically or contractually obligated to expand, only instead of expanding his sound he just looped it a few times and laid down the occasional synth string/brass or sampled expletive in the hopes of spicing things up." Noel Gardner of Drowned in Sound wrote that Sushi was a "tour through the last couple of years’ most voguish electronic microgenres, all smeared with the Ferraro jus but only sporadically impressive." He felt that "about half the album is worth hearing" when judging the tracks without figuring out the record's main concept, which Gardner said was impossible to do. Thomas May of musicOMH panned Sushi for being "high on style and decidedly low on substance," writing that it "is a potpourri of different flavours and textures which is ultimately lacking in any sense of overarching design or narrative thrust." He overall called it "a disappointing release from an artist whose previous work has been so lofty, challenging and (on occasion) rewarding." Dusted described Sushi as "enthusiastic but slight, with generic synths and run-of-the-mill dubstep-inflected bass lines."

== Track listing ==
No.	Title	Length
1.	"Powder"	3:09
2.	"Jumpshot Earth"	2:37
3.	"Flamboyant"	3:18
4.	"Playin Ya Self"	2:47
5.	"Baby Mitsubishi"	3:10
6.	"Lovesick"	3:28
7.	"E 7"	3:24
8.	"Jet Skis & Sushi"	2:59
9.	"SO N2U"	3:12
10.	"Condom"	4:15
11.	"Booty Call"	3:42
Total length:		36:01

== Release history ==
Region	Date	Format(s)	Label
Worldwide	November 6, 2012	Streaming	Hippos in Tanks
Worldwide	November 7, 2012	Digital download	Hippos in Tanks
Worldwide	December 10, 2012	Vinyl; CD	Hippos in Tanks
