= Human Story 3 =

Studio album by James Ferraro
- Released: June 14, 2016
- Genre: Classical; Modern classical; Electronic; Vaporwave
- Length: 41:07
- Producer: James Ferraro

James Ferraro chronology
| Skid Row (2015) | Human Story 3 (2016) | Rerex (2016) |

Alternate cover

Singles from Human Story 3
- 1. "Ten Songs For Humanity" Released: June 7, 2016

Human Story 3 is a studio album by American electronic musician James Ferraro, self-released on June 14, 2016. Displaying a turn towards the style and aesthetic of modern classical, the album's concept revolves philosophically and structurally on how technology that can be used meaningfully is often used less usefully for commerce and, as a result, how the technology may eventually end up subverting humanness. The record garnered critical acclaim and landed at number seven on Tiny Mix Tapes' year-end list of the best albums of 2016.

== Composition and concept ==
"I think technology is making people really egotistical and self-centered. [Brand names] become background noise, and there’s no one else there to tell you that it’s wrong, no one there to tell you that our environment is really unnatural."

— Ferraro in an interview with Spin magazine

Human Story 3 conceptually and, by its ambiguous narrative, revolves around a "smart planet" where service robots, performed by text-to-speech voices, attempt to cognitively interpret the world around them but are at the same time musically shown as still performing repetitive tasks. The aim and moral of the record is that while technology can do a lot of commands that are beneficial, it ends up only being used less usefully for commerce and, as a result, the technology may eventually end up subverting humanness. The juxtaposed words in the titles of cuts such as "Immanent Cloud," "Security Broker," or "Plastic Ocean" cause the meaning of symbols to be changed, much like how marketers alter the meaning of some objects to create what Ferraro described as strange and "contradictory" products.

The text-to-speech voices often display slight mispronunciations, which give the album a surrealistic feel regarding how technology sometimes fails to replicate human cognition. As Ferraro said, "Certain newer apps tend to bring people together – in a mechanical, artificial way – in shared space. I think that’s probably the trend, post- this hyper-individual era. So it’s obviously going to be unnatural if it’s being manipulated through a third party like that—a bit alien." Human Story 3 follows several text-to-speech characters, male and female voices, that repeat brand names, buzzwords and phrases like "IKEA," "GPS," "Starbucks," "market crash," "mobile payments," "FedEx," "smart car" and "latte" at musical swells and crescendos, along with detailed speeches. Mehan Jayasuriya of Pitchfork wrote that this dialogue feels "like a torrent of audio pop-ups that can’t be blocked."

== Inspirations ==
The name of Human Story 3 is a play on the title of the Pixar film Toy Story 3 (2010). Ferraro named the album, given that the company's works were the "mimesis of our reality." He said, "we aggressively celebrate Pixar's cloud-like performance of human emotion, building emotional relationships with CGI characters and accepting them as powerful vehicles of meaningfulness. I personally see them as a marker of the hyper-individualistic age we live in."

The instrumental backing often moves into separated moods, repetitive structures and pauses throughout each song, along with abrupt and dissonant key changes. Musically, Human Story 3 is a modern classical album that returns to the commercial-like, overloaded vaporwave style of Ferraro's Far Side Virtual (2011). Most of the digitally made textures and clanging synthesizer sounds on the album blend in with organic instruments such as strings, woodwinds, pianos and professionally recorded real-life choirs. The choral vocals were performed by the Trojans choir of the University of Southern California. Ferraro's biggest reference point for Human Story 3 was 20th century American composer Aaron Copland. Ferraro described Copland as "the purest musical spirit," reasoning that "his music wasn’t just appealing to the common denominator—it’s pandering toward their higher mind. He does that really well: just bringing in all of humanity. It represented something really, really virtuous for me." Winston Cook-Wilson, writing for Bandcamp, observed influences from the works of Igor Stravinsky, Erik Satie and Charles Ives in Human Story 3. Anna Gaca of Spin magazine compared the album's feeling to that of the Ridley Scott film Blade Runner (1982), where the record's mood of alienation and dystopia comes from how many of its elements representing AI are exaggerated or emotionally amplified.

== Release and reception ==
Professional ratings
Review scores
| Source | Rating |
|---|---|
| Pitchfork | 5.0/10 |
| Tiny Mix Tapes | 5/5 marks |

Human Story 3 was announced on May 18, 2016, with a trailer and Ferraro summarizing the album on Twitter as "a musing on hyper individualism and the marketability of neotenous plastics." The trailer consist of footage of Financial District, Manhattan. The second and third trailers of the album were released on May 24 and May 31 respectively. "Ten Songs for Humanity" was the first song released from Human Story 3 on June 7, 2016. Ferraro self-released Human Story 3 digitally and on cassette tape on June 14, 2016. The cassette release was a limited edition of only 200 copies. On June 28, 2016, Vice Media's THUMP publication premiered the video for "Plastiglomerate & Co," which they described as a "Web 1.0 rendering of a busy metropolis, gross in its idealized cleanliness; in it, almost faceless, bots bustle about and trample each other in algorithmic harmony."

Miles Bowe of Fact magazine called Human Story 3 "truly American music made by one of this generation’s great composers." He highlighted that "the album builds on various qualities found in Ferraro’s discography, dragging familiar sounds into exciting, unknown territories." The LP was number 12 on the magazine's year-end list of best Bandcamp releases. The album received a five-out-of-five review from Tiny Mix Tapes, and landed at number seven on the publication's list of the best albums of 2016, where Jude Noel praised the arrangements as "unabashedly ambitious, towering structures built upon cozy clarinet melodies and unbridled ideology." The album's cover art was put at number 13 on the publication's list of best album covers of 2016. However, in a five-out-of-ten review for Pitchfork, Jayasuriya mainly criticized the album for its lack of subtlety in how it presented its message. He gave descriptions of the record such as it being a "less artful, album-length version" of the song "Fitter Happier" by Radiohead and "just as tiring as" commercial music.

== Track listing ==
Human Story 3
| No. | Title | Length |
|---|---|---|
| 1. | "Ten Songs For Humanity" | 3:49 |
| 2. | "Marketphagia" | 3:58 |
| 3. | "Individualism" | 5:30 |
| 4. | "Market Collapse" | 3:51 |
| 5. | "GPS & Cognition" | 2:29 |
| 6. | "Security Broker" | 2:49 |
| 7. | "Anthropoceniac" | 5:00 |
| 8. | "Neotenous Smart Car" | 3:33 |
| 9. | "Plastic Ocean (Poem For Deep Horizon)" | 2:28 |
| 10. | "Immanent Cloud" | 4:13 |
| 11. | "Plastiglomerate & Co" | 3:27 |
| Total length: | | 41:07 |

== Release history ==
| Region | Date | Format(s) | Label |
|---|---|---|---|
| Worldwide | June 14, 2016 | Cassette; digital download | Self-released |
