= Forever (Sleep ∞ Over album) =

2011 studio album

Studio album by Sleep ∞ Over
- Released: 2011
- Genre: Ambient; electropop; industrial; new wave
- Length: 36:22
- Label: Hippos in Tanks
- Producer: Al Carson

Sleep ∞ Over chronology
| Casual Diamond (2011) | Forever (2011) | I Want to Be Alone (2013) |

Forever is an album by Sleep ∞ Over released on the label Hippos in Tanks in 2011.

== Background ==
Sleep ∞ Over formed in 2009 as a trio of musicians Stefanie Franciotti, Sarah Brown and Christa Palazzolo. They produced and released various singles on the labels Light Lodge and Forest Family before Brown and Palazzolo left the project to form the group Boy Friend. Thus, Franciotti was left on her own to create Sleep ∞ Over's debut studio album.

== Composition ==
Critic Guy Frowny suggests Forever is an "unfolding" of a "dark baby land," "a realm somewhere between heavens “turning by themselves,” populated by flying saucers, and the lifeworld-bound closed doors and tears that can reference either romance or depravity;" the unfolding is done by the vocals of Franciotti, symbolized as a spiritual guide.

Forever is an ambient electropop record that is "downcast, introspective, and melodic," wrote Patrick McDermott of The Boston Phoenix. In comparing Forever to the works of Peaking Lights and Sun Araw, reviewer Zach Kelly categorized it as a shoegaze record with a more "dynamic" and less "aimless" and "soupy" version of the noise-heavy, "highly textured" pop sound that was prevalent on Sleep ∞ Over's previous releases. According to Kelly, two types of tracks are prevalent on the record: slow-tempo new wave dance music and experimental music with moods that range from ambient and majestic to harsh and avant-garde.

Popmatters reviewer Zachary Houle wrote that the album alternates between two types of tracks: slow-paced "melodic keyboard pop" and experimental psychedelic noise pop instrumentals similar to songs on The Moody Blues album On the Threshold of a Dream (1969). Castor Green spotlighted the record's "full" sound, consisting of "meaty basslines, banks of drums and at times, drawn-out crescendos that recall more experimental recent albums by Julia Holter or Roly Porter." Writer Austin Powell labeled Forever in the same league as the works of Pure X and Neon Indian in that it was "redefining Texas slowcore for the chillwave generation." Critic Guy Frowny categorized the tracks into three types of styles: guitar-heavy drone music, ambient industrial music and slow-tempo, lo-fi synthesizer songs; he labeled the album's alternation between and combination of these styles to serve as its hegelian dialectic that attempts to lead to an "unrealized" solution. There are "moments where the synth lines bend and distort, purposefully disfiguring the music’s beauty for a moment both fleeting and fearful."

Frowny suggests that Franciotti sings in a manner where Forever involves a voyeur who listens to her "private" lullabies, and the listeners are "overhearing" these lullabies rather than Franciotti singing to the listeners. Franciotti's vocal performance garnered comparisons to the works of Laurel Halo, My Bloody Valentine and ethereal vocals present in the 1990s works of acts like Love Spirals Downwards from journalists. Kelly analyzed Franciotti's vocal performance to range from "approachable and human" to "unremarkable, [...] like a slurry Hope Sandoval trapped in a bell jar." Lyrically, Kelly described the songs as "frozen lullabies" consisting of problems that are figured with only an unsuggested tad bit of unsolved detail.

== Critical reception ==
Professional ratings
Aggregate scores
| Source | Rating |
|---|---|
| Metacritic | 71/100 |
Review scores
| Source | Rating |
| Austin Chronicle | 3/4 stars |
| Beats per Minute | 75% |
| The Boston Phoenix | 3.5/4 stars |
| Drowned in Sound | 8/10 |
| Fact | 3.5/5 |
| Pitchfork | 7/10 |
| Popmatters | 6/10 stars |
| Tiny Mix Tapes | 3.5/5 stars |
| Under the Radar | 7/10 stars |

Reviews of Forever were generally favorable. Green called the LP a "strong" debut, writing that its songcrafting is what made it unique from most underground lo-fi 1980s-synth-music-influenced acts in the 2010s.

In a mixed review, journalist Zachary Houle called Forever a "schizophrenic lo-fi keyboard-based version of early Sebadoh in its fractured sense of unity." He mainly criticized the record's "padded" and "formless" instrumentals but praised the "fragility" of the vocals that gave the album "structure."

== Track listing ==
1. Behind Closed Doors
2. Romantic Streams
3. Porcelain Hands
4. The Heavens Turn By Themselves
5. Casual Diamond
6. Crying Game
7. Flying Saucers Are Real
8. Stickers
9. Untitled
10. Don't Poison Everything
