= Boogie (soundtrack) =

Boogie: The Original Motion Picture Soundtrack

Soundtrack album by various artists
- Released: March 5, 2021
- Genre: Pop; hip hop; rap
- Length: 37:39
- Label: Republic
- Producer: 808Melo; Rico Beats; CashMoneyAP; Quincy "Tell Em"; Stefanccino; Yozora; Dave Clark IV; Tasha Catour; AXL Beats; Benjamin Keating (Palmistry); Henry "Junjo" Lawes; Kamaal Williams; Great John; Music Production Studios

Singles from Boogie: The Original Motion Picture Soundtrack
- 1. "AP" Released: February 25, 2021

Boogie: The Original Motion Picture Soundtrack is the soundtrack to the 2021 film Boogie. Released by Republic Records on March 5, 2021, the soundtrack consisted of 14 tracks, mostly hip hop and pop tracks. It also featured three original songs written and performed by Pop Smoke, who also starred in the film in his first and only film appearance before his death in February 2020. His song "AP" was the lead single that preceded the soundtrack.

== Background ==
The soundtrack featured several contributions from hip hop and rap artists. Pop Smoke who starred in the film as Monk, also contributed three original songs for the film. The first being "AP" served as the lead single from the album, released on February 25, 2021. An official music video for the track was released on March 19, 2021. The track topped Billboard's "Favourite Music Poll" for the week of February 28 to March 6.

== Track listing ==
Boogie: The Original Motion Picture Soundtrack track listing
No.	Title	Writer(s)	Producer(s)	Length
1.	"AP" (performed by Pop Smoke)	Bashar Jackson; Andre Loblack; Rico Lamarre; Steven Victor	808Melo; Rico Beats	2:51
2.	"Fashion" (performed by Pop Smoke featuring Polo G)	Jackson; Taurus Bartlett; Alexander Petit; Lamarre; Victor	CashMoneyAP; Rico Beats	3:19
3.	"No Cap (Remix)" (performed by Pop Smoke featuring M24)	Jackson; Dorai Harrison; Quincy Ferreira	Quincy 'Tell Em'	3:25
4.	"Up It" (performed by 10k Mula)	Jamel Dorsett	Music Production Studios	2:08
5.	"Need It" (performed by Nycani)	Dasani Browne; Filip Stefanczyk; George Bakopoulos	Stefanccino; Yozora	2:12
6.	"Plug Speak Taiwanese" (performed by Bad Boy Raco G featuring Eddie Huang)	Yen-Cheng Liu; Eddie Huang; Brandon Love; Dave Clark IV	Clark; 808Melo	2:32
7.	"Faded" (performed by Jacquees)	Rodriquez Broadnax; Kendricke Brown; Forte	Tasha Catour	2:52
8.	"Big Drip" (performed by Fivio Foreign)	Maxie Ryles III; Manalla Yusuf	AXL Beats	2:48
9.	"So Pay La" (performed by Triad God)	Vinh Ngan; Benjamin Keating	Keating; Palmistry	2:29
10.	"Stylin" (performed by Bella Sky featuring Bad Boy Raco G)	Huang; Liu; Brandon Love; David Clark	Clark	2:19
11.	"Mr. Chin" (performed by Yellowman)	Yellowman; Winston Foster	Henry "Junjo" Lawes	4:02
12.	"When It's All Over" (performed by Kamaal Williams)	Kamaal Williams	Williams	1:15
13.	"Fear Over Love" (performed by Sheff G)	Michael Williams; Johnathan Scott; Jeremy Soto; Karel Jorge	Great John	1:53
14.	"Welcome to the Party" (performed by Pop Smoke)	Bashar Jackson; Loblack	808Melo	3:34

== Chart performance ==
Chart (2012)	Peak position
UK Compilation Albums (OCC)	41
US Top Soundtracks (Billboard)	8
