= Cold (mixtape) =

Mixtape by James Ferraro
- Released: March 26, 2013
- Recorded: Early 2013
- Genre: R&B; hip-hop
- Length: 52:52
- Label: Hippos in Tanks
- Producer: James Ferraro; Daddy Kev

James Ferraro chronology
Sushi (2012)	Cold (2013)	NYC, Hell 3:00 AM (2013)

Singles from Cold
- 1. "Blood Flow" Released: March 6, 2013

Cold is a mixtape by American electronic musician James Ferraro, recorded in New York City and released in March 2013 on the Hippos in Tanks label. The press release stated that Cold is about "human drama" that is a part of a nihilistic period, as well as "the repetition and consumption of hedonism that cannot represent or replace one night of love." Described by one journalist as a pastiche of contemporary R&B and hip-hop, Cold contains elements of two-step, dubstep, techno and lounge music styles. Reviews of the mixtape were very favorable in general, common praises including its production and the use of Ferraro's own vocals.

== Production and composition ==
Written on a piano by James Ferraro and recorded by him in early 2013 with Daddy Kev in New York City, Cold includes elements of two-step, dubstep, techno and lounge music. According to its press release, Cold is about "human drama" that is a part of a nihilistic period, as well as "the repetition and consumption of hedonism that cannot represent or replace one night of love." The lonely mood of Cold is set from the start with muted street sound effects that back the sounds of an empty subway station, and is further advanced upon with the use of dark instrumentals and vocal yellings of phrases such as “Let me burn” and “Don’t put it on my blood."

In describing the structure of each track, a reviewer for Sputnikmusic wrote that "Ferraro keeps playing the music, weaving the sounds out of nothing and fading them back into nothing when he finishes, much like a child and his wondrous toy box, discarding one toy in favor of the wonder another brings over and over again." A Tiny Mix Tapes review described Cold as a pastiche of contemporary R&B and hip-hop: "Ferraro bends the styles to fit what he needs to say, because that is all that has become available to him in this world of pastiche, where we have become unable to sufficiently express our desires except through constant (incomplete) imitation." He analyzed the instrumentals to have a "horrific deepness" which causes them to be "hauntingly" disharmonious with the muffled, pitch-shifted vocal samples. An Impose magazine critic named Jason Randall Smith wrote that the dominance of Ferraro's vocals on the mixtape leads it to have a truthfulness, such as on "Dove" where he sings, "I never thought that I would live and die without you, but I'm through." Randall Smith wrote that "[Ferraro]'s off-key delivery still conveys the weight and heartbreak that such a lyric would suggest."

== Release and reception ==
Professional ratings
Review scores
Source	Rating
Pitchfork	7.2/10
Sputnikmusic	4/5
Tiny Mix Tapes	4/5 stars

A Sputnikmusic critic wrote that with Cold, "Ferraro has merely awoken long-dormant ideas and tied them together expertly in the form of a picturesque trap-rap tapestry." Fact magazine noted Cold to have an "earnest" element not present in Ferraro's other mixtapes. Tiny Mix Tapes called the mixtape an example of why Ferraro was "one of the more intriguing artists of the past few years" because he was able to do pastiche "with a shocking consistency, poignancy, and efficiency that his contemporaries can’t seem to match."

Randall Smith highlighted Ferraro's use of his own voice for Cold: "While no one will mistake him for Frank Ocean, he certainly can't be accused of not being honest on these recordings. He also described the production as what "will keep people listening" to the record, and overall concluded that the mixtape was "liable to confuse far more than it will impress" but would "certainly keep people talking" nonetheless. Lisa Blanning of Pitchfork was another critic to praise Ferraro's elementary vocal performance on the release, describing it as "endearing": "he still doesn't sing very well, but while occasionally painful, the Auto-Tuned balladry is fascinating in its oddness."

== Track listing ==
No.	Title	Length
1.	"Intro"	0:37
2.	"Fade"	3:54
3.	"Blood Flow"	3:50
4.	"E178 TH"	3:57
5.	"Light Skinned"	3:43
6.	"Dove"	3:46
7.	"Sentinel"	3:22
8.	"Slave To Rain"	4:01
9.	"Coda (Let Me Burn)"	2:06
10.	"Gargoyles"	1:45
11.	"Plated"	4:09
12.	"Tinted Windows"	3:41
13.	"Rata"	3:05
14.	"C Lord"	0:52
15.	"Turned Opp"	3:56
16.	"Vapor Weight"	3:52
17.	"Outro"	2:16
Total length:		52:52

== Release history ==
Region	Date	Format(s)	Label
Worldwide	March 26, 2013	Digital download	Hippos in Tanks
