= Sleepover (disambiguation) =

A sleepover is a party where guests are invited to stay overnight.

Sleepover(s) or Sleep Over may also refer to:

- Sleepover (film), a 2004 film
- "Sleepover" (Doctors), a 2004 television episodes
- "Sleepover", a Malcolm in the Middle episode
- "Sleepover", a That '70s Show episode
- "Sleepover", a song by Hayley Kiyoko from Expectations
- Sleepovers (book), a 2001 book by Jacqueline Wilson
- SleepOver, a 2011 album by Canadian producer Socalled
- "Sleep Over", an episode of the television series Teletubbies
- Sleep ∞ Over, an American indie rock group
- The Sleepover, a 2020 film
