= Last American Hero (album) =

- Cover of the 2010 vinyl edition

Studio album by James Ferraro
- Released: November 10, 2008
- Recorded: 2008
- Genre: Hypnagogic pop
- Length: 58:31; 29:57 (vinyl & digital editions)
- Label: Taped Sounds
- Producer: James Ferraro

James Ferraro chronology
Chameleon Ballet (2008)	Last American Hero (2008)	Heaven's Gate (2009)

Last American Hero is a studio album by American musician James Ferraro, released on November 10, 2008 by Taped Sounds. It was later repressed in March 2010 by Olde English Spelling Bee.

== Background and style ==
Last American Hero was inspired by Ferraro's experiences of living in a "kind of insane gated community for senior citizens", where his grandparents resided in Florida. He recalled feeling like he was in a "weird science experiment of consumerism" in the community, which consisted of "large flat-screen TVs, and insane Ikea couches that you can't even sit on because they're too big", as well as Chrysler PT Cruisers. As Ferraro explained, "this infrastructure of gated communities and Wal-Marts and Targets, and these complexes of shopping – that was their entire world."

The album incorporates heavily phased, bluesy guitar playing and saturated synthesizers, delay and loop effects, and thin, compressed recording quality. The cover of the tape release shows two unidentified bikers standing next to a saguaro cactus. The Olde English Spelling Bee repress includes a different cover, a picture of a Best Buy storefront along with a superimposed image from the courtroom TV program Judge Judy.

== Release and reception ==
Professional ratings
Review scores
Source	Rating
Fact	4.5/5 stars

Last American Hero was released on November 10, 2008 through Taped Sounds through a limited edition cassette, before being reissued in March 2010 by Olde English Spelling Bee as an abridged vinyl release, splitting the track listing of the A-side into 3 parts.

Writing for Fact, Kiran Sande called Last American Hero "a magnificent record" and wrote that "Ferraro's willingness to engage with the real banal, liminal ugliness of consumer life is undeniably interesting, and on this album at least, the music feels emboldened rather than burdened by it." Critic David Keenan called it "fantastic" and described it as "a series of meditations on American concepts of heroism and freedom as refracted via MTV, Hollywood and various black magic marketing strategies."

In 2023, Last American Hero, along with other albums from his early catalog, was digitally reissued and remastered by James Ferraro under his Restoration Series 1.0 series. This reissue has the same abridged track listing as the Olde English Spelling Bee reissue, but introducing a new cover art, being an edited version of the original cassette cover.

== Track listing ==
=== Original cassette release ===
No.	Title	Length
1.	"Last American Hero"	29:57
2.	"Adrenaline's End"	28:34
Total length:		58:31

=== Vinyl & digital editions ===
No.	Title	Length
1.	"F-150 Night Eros at Highway's End"	11:58
2.	"Blacktop Tumble Weed"	8:54
3.	"Headlines (Access Hollywood)"	7:15
Total length:		29:57
