= Troll (EP) =

EP by James Ferraro
- Released: November 26, 2017
- Genres: Electronic; experimental
- Length: 25:13
- Label: self-released
- Producer: James Ferraro

James Ferraro chronology
Anthrospray: Music for Extinction Renaissance (2017)	Troll (2017)	Four Pieces for Mirai (2018)

Troll is an extended play by American musician James Ferraro. The EP was self-released to his Bandcamp page on November 26, 2017, with no prior announcement. The EP gained minor attention by online news sites who reported its release.

== Background and composition ==
Hatsune Miku is used as a vocalist on several tracks, notably being the first time Ferraro's music has had strictly female vocals.

== Track listing ==
No.	Title	Length
1.	"hedonic prison"	4:24
2.	"bio-sewer"	4:00
3.	"cyber bile"	6:48
4.	"dopaminergic precision"	4:41
5.	"sedentary seed"	5:20
