= Inhale C-4 $$$$$ =

Mixtape by BEBETUNE$
- Released: December 14, 2011
- Genre: Experimental hip hop
- Length: 50:39
- Producer: James Ferraro

BEBETUNE$ chronology
Far Side Virtual (2011)	Inhale C-4 $$$$$ (2011)	Sushi (2012)

Inhale C-4 $$$$$ is a mixtape by American musician James Ferraro under the alias BEBETUNE$, released for free on December 14, 2011. Parodying the tropes of contemporary American hip hop music and its culture, it marks the first time in Ferraro's career that he approached such a style. Reviews of the mixtape were mostly positive, and it appeared in the top 20 of Tiny Mix Tapes' list of the best releases of 2012.

== Composition and concept ==
Inhale C-4 $$$$$ marks the first time Ferraro approached a hip hop style, which critic Jonathan Dean suggested was an acknowledgement of Ferraro's mixed race. Categorized by writer Rory Gibb as southern hip hop and by Impose magazine as crunk, the mixtape parodies several tropes of modern American hip hop music; production-wise, there is trap music percussion, preset trance music-style synthesizer patches, auto-tune and a BEBETUNE$ production tag. Gibb compared its hi-hat rhythms to that of the footwork and trap works of Vex'd member Kuedo. There are some songs that lack audio mixing or mastering, which satirizes the little amount of quality control in making and releasing mixtapes. The track "Li$$tening with my Eyezzz" features mumbled rapping from a character stage-named "Yung Cea$er" about being at a club, and the soft vocals on "Nero Cea$er/Anti Christ" spoof the self-loathing lines present in the works of Drake and The Weeknd. Despite the mixtape's direction, Gibb, writing for The Quietus, still noted it to have the same "glossy sounds, dense networks of samples and a convincingly web-age sheen" as Far Side Virtual (2011).

Dean wrote that there were many ways Ferraro made Inhale C-4 $$$$$ more than just a spoof of modern hip hop; the song titles, which feature references to Macau and Saharan cell phone ringtones, give the mixtape a "global" aesthetic that represents "the dense, teeming atmospheres of ultramodern, geographically hybrid urban spaces." Dean also analyzed that Ferraro suggests that there will be music movements of other genres that will contain the "low" standards of hip hop. Examples include "STREET DREAM$$", a chopped and screwed version of Gang Gang Dance's "Glass Jar", and "Sahara Jr.", a "recapitulation" of the trance style of the band's 2011 album Eye Contact. Despite the mixtape having a sound accessible to mainstream listeners, Dean noted that it had an overall "giddy horror" feel that suggests a future apocalypse caused by the overload of online data that consists of "signs, omens, and synchronicities that point to nothing other than themselves"; the track "NERO CEA$SAR/ANTI CHRIST" consists of "reptilian societies and GTA suicides", and "P.O.W.E.R." and "M A D N E $ $" are about people "tweeting the Armageddon using Siri voice commands, Hipstamatic photos, and T-Pain apps." This leads to "a digital unease aggravated by multiple references to unhinged technological proliferation."

The cover art for Inhale C-4 $$$$$ features images from a 2008 publicity stunt for a DVD release of the 1988 film Child's Play, which involved six Chucky dolls "invading" the intersection of Times Square. Dean wrote it was an homage to the cover of DJ Paul's 1993 mixtape Volume 12, Part 2, in that Inhale C-4 $$$$$ has the same dark tone.

== Release and promotion ==
Professional ratings
Review scores
Source	Rating
Fact	3.5/5
Pitchfork	3.8/10
Tiny Mix Tapes	4/5 stars

Critic Jonathan Dean labeled the marketing of Inhale C-4 $$$$$ as "a new period of manic productiveness for Ferraro", where the musician used every internet service possible, such as Twitter, YouTube and Facebook, to promote the mixtape and the project; he noted the promotion's use of "hashtags and seemingly random cultural references that lay bare the surreal process of making-viral." Ferraro released the mixtape for free download via MediaFire, and made it available for streaming on December 14, 2011.

Inhale C-4 $$$$$ garnered mostly positive reviews from critics. Gibb described Ferraro's movement towards an R&B sound as a "pretty fascinating new development from an artist always in flux." Chris Campbell, writing for Fact magazine, called it "often pretty entertaining," writing that "Bebetunes clearly isn't here to be taken too seriously, but he's got a lot more replay value than some of his subject matter." Inhale C-4 $$$$$ landed at number 14 on a year-end list by Tiny Mix Tapes of the best releases of 2012, where Unicornmang wrote that it "was secretly about locating a kernel of belief at the core of all things cultural, messy, and anxious." In a negative review, Pitchfork's Brandon Soderberg criticized Inhale C-4 $$$$$ for its "mutant strain of mainstream rap and R&B" and Ferraro for trying to recreate hip hop mixtape production, saying "the tracks here feel endless, like uninspired, snarky parodies of rap instrumentals, roving along for too long, filled with too many recycled ideas and yet, not one worth considering."

== Track listing ==
No.	Title	Length
1.	"R E P T I L E Online"	3:34
2.	"Macau Celebrities"	5:13
3.	"Machine"	1:52
4.	"Madne$$"	4:42
5.	"#Grindlyfe"	5:20
6.	"Street Dream$$"	1:53
7.	"H20"	2:54
8.	"LI$$tening With My Eyezzz" (featuring Yung Cea$er)	3:36
9.	"Pepsi B@by"	4:13
10.	"Sahara Jr."	4:59
11.	"Siri Pop"	1:15
12.	"P . O . W . E . R ."	2:27
13.	"#City Light$"	3:16
14.	"N E R O Cea$er / Anti - Chri$t"	5:25
Total length:		50:39

== Release history ==
Region	Date	Format(s)	Label
Worldwide	December 14, 2011	Digital download; streaming	Self-released
