= Requiem for Recycled Earth =

Studio album by James Ferraro
- Released: May 3, 2019
- Recorded: 2018–2019
- Length: 60:23
- Producer: James Ferraro

James Ferraro chronology
| Four Pieces for Mirai (Overture) (2018) | Requiem for Recycled Earth (2019) | Neurogeist (2020) |

Requiem for Recycled Earth is a studio album by American musician James Ferraro, released independently on May 3, 2019. The album is the first part of Ferraro's Four Pieces For Mirai series.

== Background ==
Ferraro has described the album as a "opus into ecocide and planetary divorce".

== Track listing ==
All tracks are written by James Ferraro.

| No. | Title | Length |
|---|---|---|
| 1. | "Embryo" | 4:49 |
| 2. | "No Future" | 5:55 |
| 3. | "Airless Matrix" | 2:52 |
| 4. | "Xerces Blau" | 3:03 |
| 5. | "Deleted Biosphere" | 4:54 |
| 6. | "Omega-Generation" | 3:18 |
| 7. | "Cyber Seed" | 4:16 |
| 8. | "Chemical Death" | 5:00 |
| 9. | "Weapon" | 4:13 |
| 10. | "Recycled Sky" | 2:26 |
| 11. | "Malign Blossom" | 6:49 |
| 12. | "Gaia Wept Effluent" | 6:10 |
| 13. | "Spawn of Hate" | 6:38 |
