= Four Pieces for Mirai (Overture) =

EP by James Ferraro
- Released: May 18, 2018
- Genre: Electronic; experimental
- Length: 36:34
- Producer: James Ferraro

James Ferraro chronology
Troll (2017)	Four Pieces for Mirai (Overture) (2018)	Requiem for Recycled Earth (2019)

Four Pieces for Mirai (Overture) is an extended play by American musician James Ferraro. It was self-released on May 18, 2018, on his Bandcamp page and later on other music platforms. Ferraro also released the album on cassette. The EP is the overture to Ferraro's Four Pieces for Mirai series.

== Background ==
Four Pieces for Mirai (Overture) is an overture to Ferraro's own post-apocalyptic narrative, Four Pieces for Mirai, "a large body of work that spans across multiple releases", involving Mirai, a malware that turns networked devices running Linux into remotely controlled "bots" that can be used as part of a botnet in large-scale network attacks. Mirai's presence in the narrative is that of a savior, rather than a destructive force. In the Bandcamp description for the release, Ferraro describes Four Pieces For Mirai as "integrating medieval chorals to baroque to ambient noise to MIDI generated music, and other musical anthropology".

In this introductory prologue Ferraro reveals a dystopian present, a society in servitude to its digital network and its savior Mirai a computer virus with a "denial of service" malware system that attacks "Internet of Things" devices. in essence disrupting the hold of the internet on humanity. It is from this aspect that Ferraro builds his philosophical allegory of technological plague, hyper connectivity, social famine and virtual exodus.

== Track listing ==
All tracks are written by James Ferraro.

No.	Title	Length
1.	"Fossils"	1:24
2.	"Green Hill Cross"	6:36
3.	"Butterfly"	7:53
4.	"Mirai"	8:39
5.	"Remnant"	8:07
6.	"Gulf Gutters"	3:54
