= Sleep ∞ Over =

Indie rock and experimental pop project

- Origin: Austin, Texas, U.S.
- Genres: Indie rock, experimental pop
- Years active: 2009–present
- Label: Hippos in Tanks
- Members: Stefanie Franciotti
- Past members: Christa Palazzolo; Sarah Brown

Sleep ∞ Over is an American indie rock and experimental pop project founded by Stefanie Franciotti. The project began in late 2009 after Franciotti recruited collaborators Christa Palazzolo and Sarah Brown. When the latter two left, Franciotti continued to record under the name.

Franciotti released a single titled "Casual Diamond" in 2011 on the Hippos in Tanks label, followed by her first full album, Forever, later that same year.

Franciotti said of the breakup with her former bandmates: "I wanted to see the songs I had written [happen]. The whole experience was pretty soul-crushing at the time but we're all over it now".

In 2013, Franciotti released a double single titled "Rooftop / I Want to Be Alone" on Hippos in Tanks.

== Discography ==
=== Studio albums ===
- Forever (2011)

=== Extended plays ===
- Sleep ∞ Over (2010)
- Daytrotter Session (2011)

=== Singles ===
- "Dream Over / Your World Is Night" (with Pure X) (2010)
- "Outer Limits / La Rose" (2010)
- "Casual Diamond" (2011)
- "Romantic Streams (Nguzunguzu Remix)" (2011)
- "Rooftop / I Want to Be Alone" (2013)
- "Don't Wanna Hide" (2017)
- "Earliest Memory" (2020)
- "Trace Moment" (2020)
- "Clinging to Life - Sleep ∞ Over Remix" (with Single Lash) (2024)
