= Palmistry (musician) =

- Born: Benjamin (Benjy) Keating; Kilkenny, Ireland
- Genres: Electronic, Pop
- Occupations: Musician, Songwriter, Producer
- Labels: Mixpak, Fool's Gold
- Website: Instagram

Benjamin (Benjy) Keating, known professionally as Palmistry, is a musician and producer. He creates minimalist pop influenced by dancehall music and has produced music for Charli XCX, Yung Lean, Bladee, and Triad God.

== Early life ==
Born Benjamin Keating in Kilkenny, Ireland, he was raised by non-denominational Christian ministers. His mother was a musician at their church, while his father was a former drug user who became involved in Christianity in prison. At age 10, his family moved to Peterborough, England. He has spoken about feeling "weird" as a child and like his family was disliked by others. In his teens, he moved away from his family to London where he joined an industrial music band. Palmistry's father died when he was 15.

== Career ==
Palmistry began producing music around 2010. His credits include work for Charli XCX, Yung Lean, Bladee, and Triad God.

In London, Palmistry was exposed to dancehall music which influenced his own style. His early singles include "Catch", a collaboration with SOPHIE, "Protector SE5", named a best song of 2014 by The Fader, and "Memory Taffeta", which raised his profile as an artist. Lil Gem, an EP, was released on Presto?! in 2013. Ascensión, a mixtape, was self-released in 2014.

Mixpak Records released Palmistry's debut album, Pagan, in 2016. He did all of the songwriting, performances, and production. The album exhibits pop and dancehall elements but with a stripped-down, minimalist, and melancholy sound. The New Yorker wrote about Palmistry's experimentation with and repackaging of dancehall elements, calling the album "a dancehall record at heart" and "an emotional blend of recognizable and alien pop music". Pitchfork rated the album 5/10, calling it "muddled, amorphous and repetitive" and criticizing Palmistry's vocals and lyrics. PopMatters wrote that some listeners may find "moments of surprising beauty", while others will find it shallow and boring. Red Bull named it a best album of 2016. "Lifted" was used in the 2018 track "Miss You" by Cashmere Cat, Major Lazer, and Tory Lanez.

Palmistry largely composed his second album, Afterlife (2019), in Athens and Brooklyn. Fact named it a best album of 2019 and said it had "the catchiest, druggiest songs he has ever made." The album included collaborations with SOPHIE, Cashmere Cat, and Mechatok. Palmistry followed up with Post Eternity (2020), released on Fool's Gold Records. By 2021, Palmistry moved to California. He co-wrote wyrdo (2021) with Danny Parker. Stereogum said it was "all terribly lovely and reassuring, and it sounds like nothing else". Shortly before his longtime collaborator SOPHIE died in early 2021, they created two songs together as Sophistry. In September, he released the songs in a mix for Fact Magazine.

Palmistry's next album, TINKERBELL (2022), is 16 minutes long. Inspired by his work with Triad God, the album contains spiritual themes and tells the story of a drug dealer named Tinkerbell. In an interview with PAPER Magazine, Palmistry stated, "I feel like, honestly, I normally hate all the music that I’ve made. But this the first record I’ve been really proud of." Collaborators included Yung Lean, Bladee, and Isabella Lovestory. Dazed named "Bad Vibes" one of 20 best tracks of 2022, saying that it aptly represents the pessimism about the future that many people feel.

Around 2022, Palmistry moved to Athens. He spent several months producing Psykos (2024) for Bladee and Yung Lean, largely in Sweden and Thailand. In interviews, he has spoken about the toll that working on the album took on his mental health. In 2025, Palmistry released T2. A Vogue editor proposed "Writ Capo" as the song of the summer, likening it to "the sonic equivalent of sun sparkling off water." Later that year, Palmistry participated in No Music For Genocide, a campaign to remove music from streaming services in Israel.

== Style ==
Palmistry's influences include Popcaan, Vybz Kartel, Alkaline, and Mr Eazi. PopMatters called his music bedroom dance-pop, lo-fi electronica, and "tip-toed dancehall for fragile souls." Stereogum described it as "a strange and particular kind of introvert pop music". DMY called it "melancholic, gossamer-fine dancehall". Palmistry is a fan of Dambudzo Marechera and Rainer Maria Rilke.

== Discography ==
=== Singles ===
- 2013: "Catch"
- 2014: "Protector SE5"
- 2015: "Memory Taffeta"

=== EPs ===
- 2013: Little Gem

=== Mixtapes ===
- 2014: Ascensión

=== Albums ===
- 2016: Pagan (Mixpak)
- 2019: Afterlife (Mixpak)
- 2020: Post Eternity (Fool's Gold)
- 2021: wyrdo (Fool's Gold)
- 2022: Tinkerbell
- 2025: T2
