= James Ferraro =

American musician (born 1986)

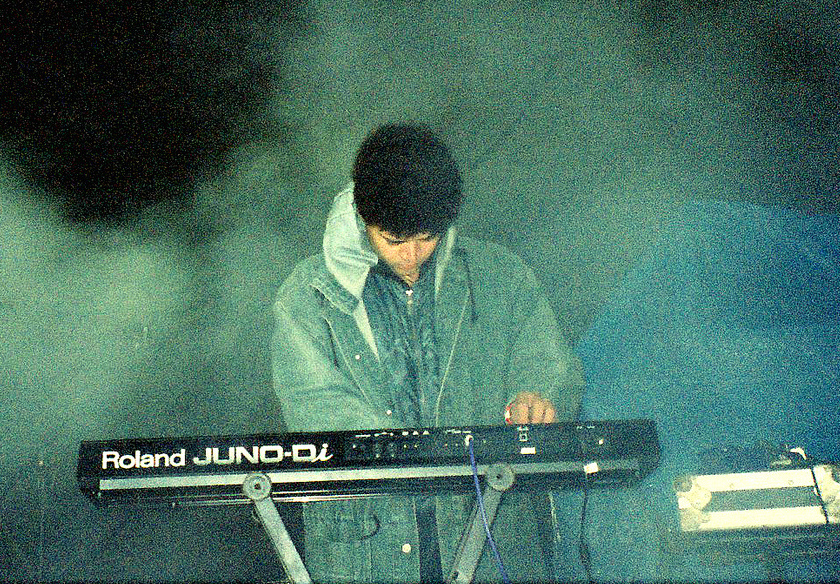
- Ferraro performing in 2012

Background information
- Also known as: Bebetune$; Edward Flex; K2; Lamborghini Crystal; The Wooden Cupboard; Dreams; Suki Girlz; Gecko Afterlife HD; Grapes; Avatar Salad
- Born: November 7, 1986 (age 40); Rochester, New York, U.S.
- Genres: Electronic; experimental; hypnagogic pop; vaporwave
- Instruments: Synthesizer, rompler, computer, sampler, piano, vocals
- Years active: 2004–present
- Labels: Independent; previously on Hippos in Tanks; Olde English Spelling Bee; New Age Tapes; Holy Mountain
- Member of: The Skaters; Bodyguard; Edward Flex; Pacific Rat Temple Band; FRKWYS 7 Ensemble; Jim Ferraro
- Website: James Ferraro on Bandcamp

James Ferraro (born November 7, 1986) is an American musician, singer, producer, multi-instrumentalist, composer, contemporary artist and video game developer. He has been credited as a pioneer of the 21st-century genres post-noise, hypnagogic pop and vaporwave, with his work exploring themes related to hyperreality and consumer culture. His music has drawn on diverse styles such as contemporary classical music, new age, electronica, drone, sound collages, R&B and hip-hop.

Ferraro began his career in the early 2000s with the formation of the Californian noise duo the Skaters, alongside musician Spencer Clark, after which he began recording solo work under a wide variety of aliases. He released music on several self-owned labels such as New Age Tapes and Muscleworks Inc. His work with the Skaters was credited by music critic Simon Reynolds with catalyzing an "international post-noise network". In 2010, he released the album Night Dolls with Hairspray.

In 2011, Ferraro began working with the label Hippos in Tanks, gaining wider recognition when his polarizing album Far Side Virtual was chosen as Album of the Year by The Wire. The album marked a shift from his previous lo-fi music style to a clearer, more electronic sound described as "lurid HD postmodernity" by Tiny Mix Tapes. He later explored styles such as hip-hop through the group Bodyguard with Yves Tumor, and under the alias BEBETUNE$. He released other projects under the label such as Sushi and NYC, Hell 3:00 AM, before pivoting to solely releasing projects independently like Human Story 3. In the 2020s, he collaborated with Bladee on his album Cold Visions and developed an interactive game known as Sanctuary; he additionally released the game Desolation Seed as early access.

== Biography ==
=== Early life and the Skaters ===
Ferraro was born in Rochester, New York, to Italian and African-American parents. He came from a musical background; his father was a musician, DJ, and record enthusiast, while his mother was a singer. He began making instrumentals in high school with the program MTV Music Generator (1999). When Ferraro was 18, he moved from New York to San Diego, California, where he met Spencer Clark. He explained that "we had this conversation and it ended with us collaborating on visual art and paintings and stuff together."

When Ferraro was 20, he formed a drone noise music project with Clark called the Skaters. After a year of recording, they began touring around the country and issued releases from that year of recording. Physicalities Of The Sensibilities Of Ingrediential Stairways (2008), issued on Eclipse Records, was the last record released by the Skaters. The group and Ferraro's work from this period would later be referred to by writers as "post-noise psychedelia" or "post-noise". In 2010, music critic Simon Reynolds stated the Skaters had catalysed an "international post-noise network", a phrase which had been featured in writer David Keenan's 2009 article Childhood's End in issue 306 of the British music magazine The Wire where he coined the term hypnagogic pop. The article would reference the group and Ferraro's work.

=== Solo career ===
Ferraro started the label New Age Tapes to release his own solo work; his early solo material was often released under myriad pseudonyms such as Lamborghini Crystal and Teotihuacan and was often distributed as limited cassettes or CD-Rs, although some LPs, such as Clear (2008) and Last American Hero (2008), were released through labels such as Holy Mountain Records and Olde English Spelling Bee. According to AllMusic's Paul Simpson, these early recordings "explored everything from gamelan to drone to lo-fi Casio pop" and were associated with the 2000s "hypnagogic pop" trend by the media. Around 2010, Ferraro's music developed an eccentric pop style on releases such as the high-school themed Night Dolls with Hairspray (2010). He also collaborated on the 2011 RVNG ambient album collaboration FRKWYS 7 with Daniel Lopatin, David Borden, Laurel Halo, and Sam Godin.

In 2011, Ferraro began working with the label Hippos in Tanks. His album Far Side Virtual abruptly embraced MIDI music technology and corporate Muzak. Beginning as a series of ringtones, the album was met with both praise and derision from critics and was named Album of the Year by British music magazine The Wire; it was described as "providing a postmodern critique on consumer culture, retro-futurism, and hyperreality", and along with Lopatin's Chuck Person's Eccojams Vol. 1 would go on to influence the Internet microgenre vaporwave, which explored similar themes. In 2012, Ferraro performed at Primavera Sound. Following the release of Far Side Virtual, Ferraro's work became increasingly influenced by contemporary hip hop and R&B, as seen on albums such as Sushi (2012), NYC, Hell 3:00 AM (2013), and Skid Row (2015). He also released digital downloads under aliases such as Bebetune$ and Bodyguard. His 2016 album Human Story 3 returned to themes explored on Far Side Virtual.

In August 2017, Ferraro's multimedia art exhibition Extinction Renaissance premiered at the Loyal Gallery in Stockholm, Sweden. Ferraro also released a limited edition musical piece, 'Anthrospray: Music for Extinction Renaissance', on USB credit cards through the Loyal Gallery's website. On November 26, 2017, Ferraro digitally released Troll, a five-track EP. In February 2018, Ferraro officially premiered Plague, an opera with scenography by Nate Boyce, at the 2018 transmediale festival. The work starred German actor Christoph Schüchner as an "undead" Steve Jobs, "the surrogate of a deranged AI, a data mongrel comprised of all our networked activity", and also featured chorales by PHØNIX16. On May 18, 2018, Ferraro digitally released Four Pieces for Mirai, an EP working as the first part of and the prologue to the project of the same name. Ferraro was featured and interviewed on the cover of the 416th issue of The Wire in October 2018.

In 2024, he collaborated with Bladee on his 2024 album Cold Visions. In 2025, Ferraro and Bladee's single-player virtual world project Sanctuary was unveiled through Microsoft and TBA Agency's generative AI showcase Artifacts.

As late as 2023, Ferraro, under ECS Software, has worked on a dystopian video game known as Desolation Seed, described as being a game where you can "explore an open world of eco-cide and societal ruin". The game originally was expected to release in the late winter to early spring of 2023 but did not end up releasing within this time frame. Samples of the gameplay through videos and images have been consistently posted on Ferraro's Instagram stories and Twitter. The samples that were posted have a resemblance to Artifacts, his virtual world project with Bladee. On June 2, 2026, ECS Software posted on their Instagram stating that Desolation Seed will release under early access on June 22, 2026.

== Artistry ==
Ferraro has created music since the mid-2000s, initially with Spencer Clark as the Skaters. His style has ranged from drone music and noise music with a lo-fi ethos to sound collages. His works are known for being conceptual in nature and for uniquely expressing specific modern subjects; his albums have incorporated themes of consumerism, cybernetics, emaciation, social experience, hyperreality, post-9/11 New York, lo-fi counterculture, and the collapse of civilization. His 2011 work Far Side Virtual is often credited for helping to spark the development of the internet-based micro-genre vaporwave, although he has not considered himself a part of its history.

In a 2009 issue of The Wire, David Keenan characterized Ferraro as a progenitor of an emerging post-noise music style dubbed "hypnagogic pop", in which memory and nostalgia for retro formats (especially 1980s recording technology and culture) acted as a defining characteristic.

Red Bull Music Academy described the concept of Ferraro's albums as regarding the "dark underbelly of masculine culture in the digital age." Most of Ferraro's records take place in dystopian environments, focusing on the consequences of consumerism. According to Ferraro, the consumerism concept of his albums came from his interest in "signs" and "symbols" and the fact that they lose their identity due to "excessive repetition." His works have been compared to theories of French sociologist Jean Baudrillard, who stated that only "symbols" and "signs" have destroyed any sort of real meaning and that human activity is "only a simulation of reality".

The sounds Ferraro uses are those that humans encounter but are not aware of. These include television jingles, cell phone ringtones, and ATM noises. Robert Grunenberg of Ssense characterized the sounds as "communicational tools" between humans and electronics that are "informing, warning, or pleasing" humans. He also writes that "the shelf life of electronic audio rarely surpasses that of your average milk carton. And so, his compilations become a nostalgic sound archive of the near-past". Overall, Grunenberg analyzed that concepts of Ferraro's sound palette was that "as much as we are living under the dominance of our visual culture, we are greatly affected by the powers of our audio culture as well". Ferraro symbolized the nostalgia element that comes out of these "near-past" sounds as "the decline of American prosperity, a ghost of a once-superpower that is dying". In making an album, Ferraro says that he comes up with a "vision", or an imaginary visual picture of what it will be. He explained in a 2012 interview, "I try not to be overly conceptual about what I'm doing. You can contrive it to a point where it gets too heady. Music-wise, I try to be careful." When interviewed by Bomb magazine on the subject of sampling in 2013, Ferraro said, "I sample my own sources of sounds. I use AT&T Natural Voices and text-to-speech generators so it's all original content."

== Discography ==
=== As James Ferraro ===
==== Studio albums ====
| Year | Title |
|---|---|
| 2007 | Alternative Soundtrack To: Scream in Blue Surf Video |
| 2008 | Postremo Mundus Techno-Symposium |
| 2008 | Virtual Erase |
| 2008 | Clear |
| 2008 | Discovery |
| 2008 | Marble Surf |
| 2008 | Multitopia |
| 2008 | Last American Hero / Adrenaline's End |
| 2009 | Heaven's Gate |
| 2009 | Genie Head Gas in the Tower of Dreams (Jesters Midnight Toys) |
| 2009 | KFC City 3099: Pt.1 Toxic Spill |
| 2009 | Star Digital Theatre: Movies for P.T. Cruisers |
| 2009 | Jarvid 9: Flushpipe |
| 2009 | Jarvid 9: Gecko |
| 2009 | Jarvid 9: Kava Jar Race |
| 2009 | Body Fusion 1 |
| 2009 | Body Fusion 2 |
| 2009 | REREX 1 |
| 2009 | REREX 2 |
| 2009 | iAsia |
| 2009 | Son Of Dracula |
| 2009 | Wild World |
| 2009 | Hacker Track |
| 2009 | Pixarni |
| 2010 | Feed Me |
| 2010 | Night Dolls With Hairspray |
| 2011 | Far Side Virtual |
| 2012 | Sushi |
| 2013 | NYC, Hell 3:00 AM |
| 2015 | Skid Row |
| 2016 | Human Story 3 |
| 2017 | Anthrospray: Music for Extinction Renaissance |
| 2017 | Speed |
| 2019 | Requiem For Recycled Earth |
| 2020 | Neurogeist |
| 2021 | Terminus |
| 2021 | They Don't Know It's Christmas |
| 2023 | Concerto I for Strings |
| 2023 | Concerto II for Strings |
| 2024 | Genware I: DIHCRO |
| 2024 | Genware II: Eigen Embryo |
| 2024 | Genware III: Neuralpaint |
| 2025 | Sanctuary OST |
| 2026 | Desolation Seed Soundscapes |

==== Demos ====
| Year | Title |
|---|---|
| 2009 | Angels with Tongue Rings |
| 2009 | Bigfoot |
| 2009 | Dino Hunter / Flat Screen Dreams |
| 2009 | Genie Embryo Garden / Netscapes |
| 2009 | Too Hot for TV |

==== Mixtapes ====
| Year | Title |
|---|---|
| 2013 | Cold |

==== Compilations ====
| Year | Title |
|---|---|
| 2009 | Citrac |
| 2016 | Rerex |

==== Extended plays ====
| Year | Title |
|---|---|
| 2011 | Condo Pets |
| 2012 | Hurting |
| 2013 | God Of London |
| 2014 | Eco – Savage Suite |
| 2014 | LAPD (Extended Motifs) |
| 2014 | 1 WTC |
| 2015 | War |
| 2015 | FUKU-TONE |
| 2016 | Burning Prius ® |
| 2017 | Fanfare for the Boston Marathon 2017 |
| 2017 | Troll |
| 2018 | Four Pieces for Mirai (Overture) |

=== As Lamborghini Crystal ===
==== Studio albums ====
| Year | Title |
|---|---|
| 2006 | 1992 Cool Runnings |
| 2006 | Lamborghini Crystal |
| 2007 | Clock Tower Acid |
| 2007 | Demon Channels (Radio Demons) |
| 2007 | Dial: 747 Creepozoid |
| 2007 | Draco-Shop Bop Vol. 1 |
| 2007 | Little Deuce Coupe T.V. Dinners |
| 2007 | Roach Motel |
| 2007 | Smoking Out His Majesties UFO |
| 2007 | Sky Divers Request / Cyborg Chillers |
| 2008 | Refried Demon Channels |

==== Compilations ====
| Year | Title |
|---|---|
| 2007 | Alien Microwave |

=== Releases under other aliases ===
==== Studio albums ====
| Year | Title | Alias released under |
|---|---|---|
| 2004 | Cruisin' the Nightbiker Strip 1977 | Cruisin' the Nightbiker Strip 1977 |
| 2005 | Sunbrain Albino (Aquarium Temples) | 8pashupatinath |
| 2005 | Acid Eagle | Acid Eagle |
| 2005 | Newage Panther Mistique | Newage Panther Mistique |
| 2005 | Live Smokeshows From Inside the Ciguri Cave Hazed Diamonds With Windswept Hair | Teotihuacán |
| 2005 | Teotihuacán | Teotihuacán |
| 2006 | Dreams | Dreams |
| 2006 | Purple Gongs | Purple Gongs |
| 2006 | Pan als Allgott Saturnia, 1977 | Pan als Allgott Saturnia, 1977 |
| 2006 | Wheel of Heaven | Snake Figures Fan |
| 2006 | Composition of the Sensibilities of Melted Knowledge | Composition of the Sensibilities of Melted Knowledge |
| 2007 | Body of Consciousness / Uguiya to Jeep by Iguana Greenwave | Nirvana |
| 2007 | Malanyang Nirvana Safari | Nirvana |
| 2007 | Peyote Cactus Rituals | Peyote Cactus Rituals |
| 2007 | Slippery Beach Trashed Gamelan | Splash |
| 2007 | Prelude to Diminishing Forms | Sky and Mirrorbalm in Preparation for Deja Vu |
| 2008 | D.M.T. | D.M.T. |
| 2008 | Infrared Roots | D.M.T. |
| 2008 | Chameleon Ballet | K2 |
| 2008 | Symbio-Dome | K2 |
| 2008 | Encino Man: Cryogenic Awakening | K2 |
| 2008 | Silicon Oasis | K2 |
| 2008 | Alternative Soundtrack to "Digital Overdrive" | Liquid Metal |
| 2010 | iAsia 2 Raver | Avatar Salad |

==== Mixtapes ====
| Year | Title | Alias released under |
|---|---|---|
| 2011 | Inhale C-4 $$$$$ | BEBETUNE$ |
| 2014 | Suki Girlz | User703918785 |

==== Extended plays ====
| Year | Title | Alias released under |
|---|---|---|
| 2005 | Menstrual Chinese Dream | Menstrual Chinese Dream |
| 2005 | Boiling the Animal in the Sky | The Wooden Cupboard |
| 2005 | Palm Reading in the Sacred Universe Wilderness | The Wooden Cupboard |
| 2005 | Animals Speak the Spirit Tongue | The Wooden Cupboard |
| 2007 | Observatory cg II & III (Coconut of Teotihuacan) | Arecaceae |

== Videography ==
| Year | Title | Reference |
|---|---|---|
| 2009 | Rapture Adrenaline | |
| 2010 | Blackberry Hill | |
| 2012 | Welcome to Candyland | |
| 2017 | 9/11 Simulation in Roblox Environment | |
| 2019 | Xerces Blau | |

== Bibliography ==
- Whiteley, Sheila; Rambarran, Shara (2016). The Oxford Handbook of Music and Virtuality. Oxford: Oxford University Press. ISBN 978-0-19-932128-5.
- Trainer, Adam (2016). "From Hypnagogia to Distroid: Postironic Musical Renderings of Personal Memory". The Oxford Handbook of Music and Virtuality. Oxford University Press. ISBN 978-0-19-932128-5.
