= Far Side Virtual =

Studio album by James Ferraro
- Released: October 25, 2011
- Genres: Utopian virtual; muzak
- Length: 45:29
- Label: Hippos in Tanks
- Producer: James Ferraro

James Ferraro chronology
Condo Pets (2011)	Far Side Virtual (2011)	Inhale C-4 $$$$$ (2011)

Singles from Far Side Virtual
- 1. "Adventures in Green Foot Printing" Released: October 4, 2011; 2. "Earth Minutes" Released: October 18, 2011

Far Side Virtual is a studio album by American electronic musician James Ferraro, released on October 25, 2011 by Hippos in Tanks. Conceived as a series of ringtones, the album marked Ferraro's transition from his previous lo-fi recording approach to a sharply produced, electronic aesthetic that deliberately evokes sources such as elevator music, corporate mood music, easy listening, and early computer sound design. The album has been interpreted as engaging with themes such as hyperreality, disposable consumer culture, 1990s retrofuturism, advertising, and musical kitsch.

Far Side Virtual was met with polarizing but generally positive reviews, with most critics commending its conceptual underpinnings and noting its ambiguous relationship to its subject. It was named album of the year by British magazine The Wire, a decision which was met with contention from some journalists and readers. The album has since been cited as one of the forerunners to the internet microgenre vaporwave as well as its offshoot utopian virtual.

== Concept ==
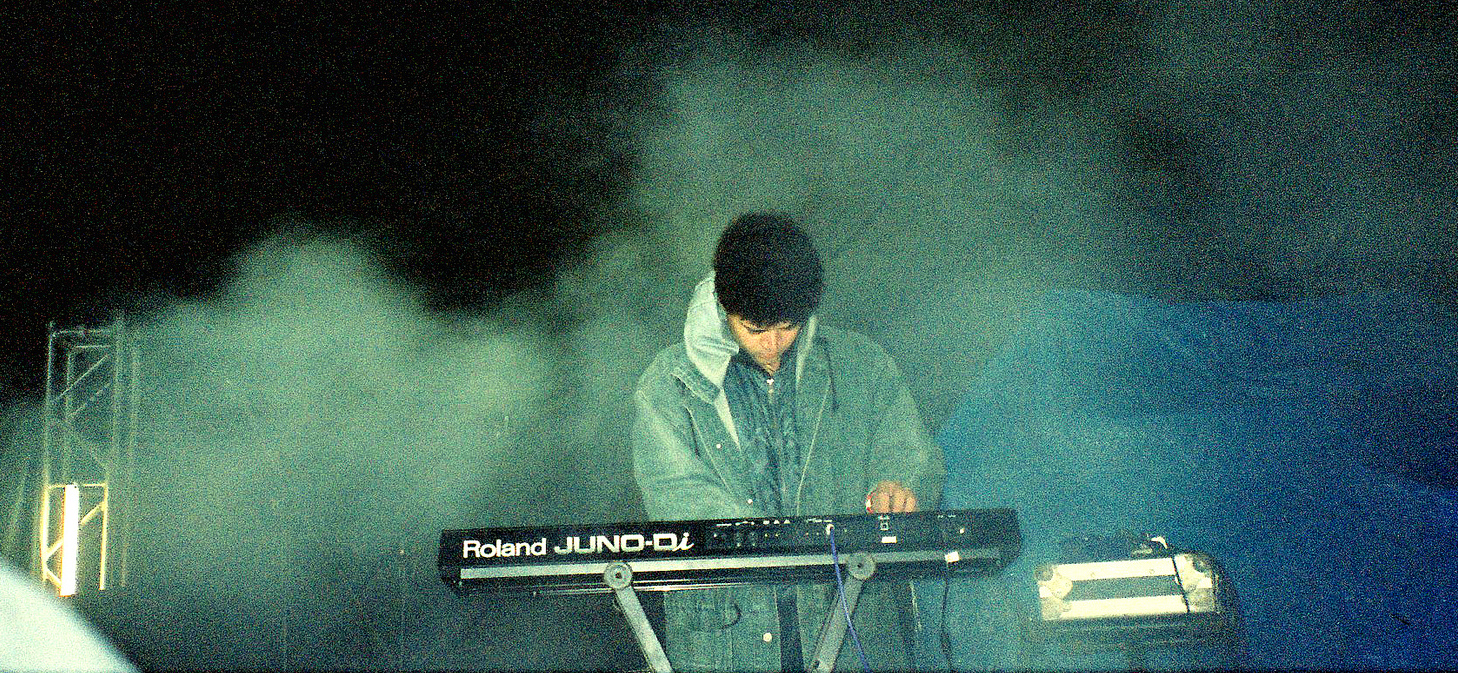
Ferraro's musical style changed to a clearer and more electronic sound for Far Side Virtual, while continuing to explore themes from his previous work.

Ferraro explained that his original idea had been to release the sixteen compositions on Far Side Virtual as a set of downloadable ringtones, but wanted the songs to have the impact of a complete album. He felt that few would want to purchase the music as a set of ringtones, but said, "Hopefully these songs [will be] made available for ringtone[s] and the album will be condensed into ringtone format so the album won't be the centerpiece, it will just dissipate into the infrastructure. The record is just the contained gallery space of these ringtone compositions." Ferraro said that listeners using songs from Far Side Virtual as ringtones was the realization of the album as "a performance art installation".

Ferraro said, "When I made Far Side Virtual, I was really into grime. I lived in Leeds for a year and I used to hear to kids listening to instrumentals on their phones, rapping over the top. I love the way that sounds: the texture of super compressed digital beats coming out of a cellphone and just a voice over it. Far Side Virtual was inspired by hearing music like that."

== Production ==
Ferraro created Far Side Virtual with the Apple audio software GarageBand, which brought out the "cheap digital sound" he desired, and called it a "[r]ubbery plastic symphony for global warming, dedicated to the Great Pacific Garbage Patch". He said, "This is ringtone music meant to be experienced on the post-structuralist medium, the smartphone." Ferraro frequently described it as a musical still life of the 21st century, specifically the year it was released. Electronic musician Dan Deacon praised the album for its unaltered, standard MIDI sound. The sources of most of the album's found sounds have been described as "perversely commonplace", and include the Skype log-in sound and synthesized voices that appear to mimic interactivity.

"Adventures in Green Foot Printing"
The album's first single "Adventures in Green Foot Printing" is an example of Ferraro's use of clean production and keyboards inspired by 1990s-era computer sounds.

Commenting on the production style, Joseph Stannard of The Wire wrote, "In contrast to the audio soup of Ferraro's earlier recordings, these tracks have a spacious, architectural feel that recalls Laurie Anderson, Philip Glass and Rush." Critics noted that the album abandons the veneer of noise that coats Ferraro's previous releases while retaining—and reimagining—the form and ethos of noise music. Ferraro said "it's still in the tradition of noise."

The album was retrospectively tagged as one of the most influential releases to vaporwave, a genre mostly spread via the Internet and identified by its adoption of dated electronic "corporate mood music" and ambiguously ironic attitude.

== Artwork and title ==
The album's cover artwork displays a pair of iPads displaying abstract designs (with one placed as a head on a tuxedo), superimposed over a low-resolution image of 5th Avenue in Manhattan as viewed in Google Street View. Explaining the title in an interview, Ferraro said:

Far Side Virtual mainly designates a space in society, or a mode of behaving. All of these things operating in synchronicity: like ringtones, flat-screens, theater, cuisine, fashion, sushi. I don't want to call it "virtual reality," so I call it Far Side Virtual. If you really want to understand Far Side, first off, listen to [Claude] Debussy, and secondly, go into a frozen yogurt shop. Afterwards, go into an Apple store and just fool around, hang out in there. Afterwards, go to Starbucks and get a gift card. They have a book there on the history of Starbucks—buy this book and go home. If you do all these things you'll understand what Far Side Virtual is — because people kind of live in it already.

== Release ==
Far Side Virtual was announced in May 2011 as Ferraro's first album on the Hippos in Tanks label. The label first released the digital extended play (EP) Condo Pets, which was intended as a preview of the sound of the forthcoming LP. Karen Ka Ying Chan, writer for Dummy, identified the theme of the two releases as Ferraro's "fascination of the surreal side of American living". Amber Bravo of The Fader said that Far Side Virtual had been "billed somewhat as a cultural critique as told through MIDI-synths".

Ferraro's satirically written announcement for the album read, in part, "All the proceeds from Far Side Virtual are going towards my facial reconstructive plastic surgery. My new face will be fashioned after CCTV's satellite queen, Princess Diana. And you will be able to see it live in concert on the Far Side Virtual World Tour.. Always coca cola."

The tracks "Adventures in Green Foot Printing" and "Earth Minutes" were released as promotional singles in advance of the album.

== Symbolism and interpretations ==
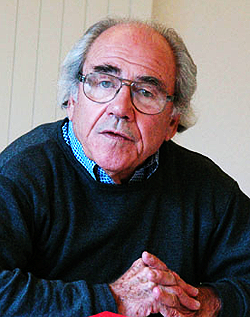
Baudrillard

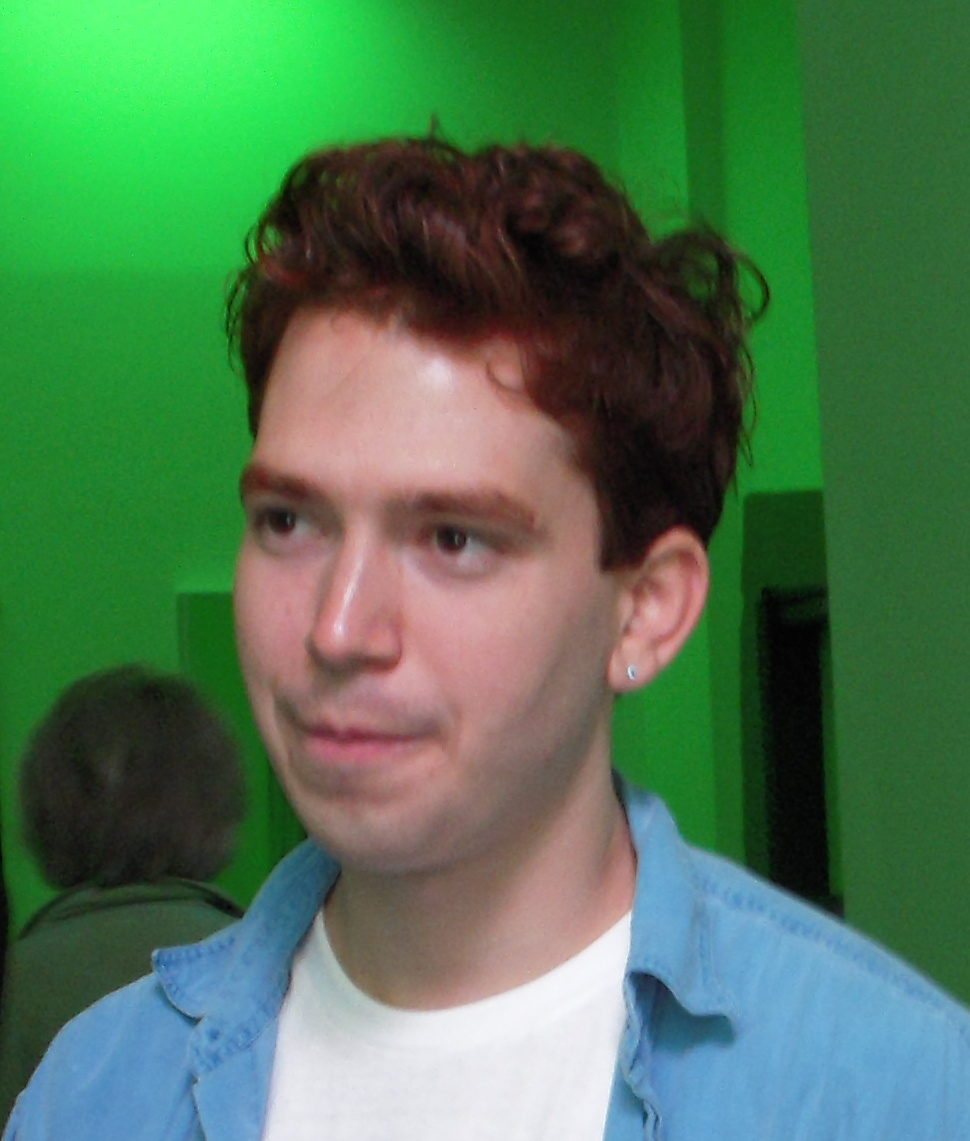
Trecartin

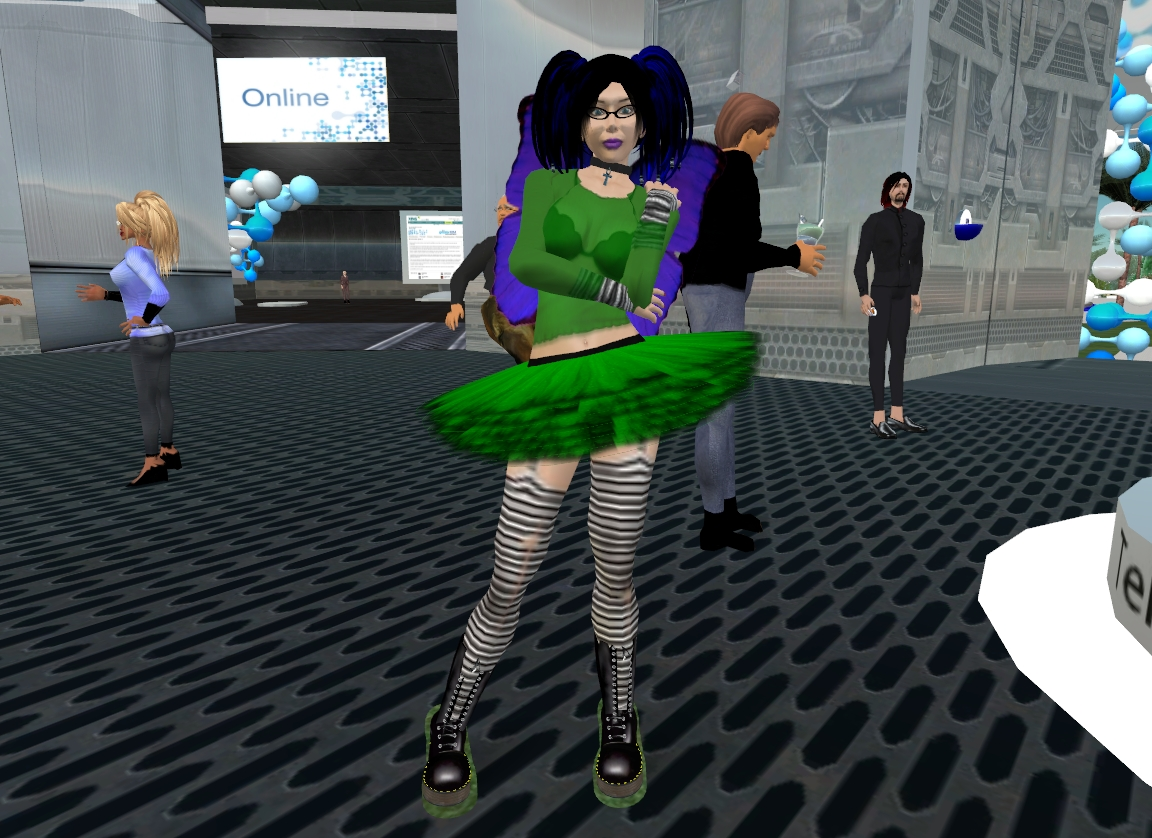
Second Life screenshot

Critics have compared Far Side Virtual to the works of the French cultural theorist Jean Baudrillard, video art by Ryan Trecartin, and the virtual world of Second Life.

Andy Battaglia compared the feeling of the music to the online virtual world Second Life, the city-building game SimCity, and the work of experimental filmmaker Ryan Trecartin. Adam Harper of Dummy called it a "pastiche [of] a kind of music you never knew you knew existed: techno-capitalist stock promotional music for the era of the personal computer ... Each track is bristling with the maximalist promise of a world of possibilities waiting behind the screen for your double-click, and evokes a time when we were much less familiar with and cynical about the virtual world technology has brought us into." Bomb writer Luke Degnan wrote, "This is what Far Side Virtual does for 45 minutes—it reminds the listener that these sounds were born digitally and will die digitally. This is a digital album for a digital age."

According to Bomb magazine writer Luke Degan, the album is unlike the "reverbed-out, feedback-laden noise" of Ferraro's earlier music, but instead represents the noise of the "digital age". A Fact writer said, "there's no distortion, no tape-hiss, no obvious underground signifiers... [but] this new cleanness and clarity to the Ferraro aesthetic hasn't diminished the hallucinatory power of his music... [the songs] will terrify you to the core even as they evoke the soundtrack of a third-tier Melanie Griffith rom-com or a forgotten Phil Collins B-side." Another critic said, "while Ferraro is interested in issues of distance and impermanence, there is no lo-fi fuzz or warm nostalgic haze to temper how flat and ugly the music he's referencing on Far Side Virtual is." Stereogum described the album as "nihilistic easy-listening."

Like Ferraro's previous albums Night Dolls with Hairspray and Last American Hero, Far Side Virtual expressed as one critic noted "a pre-DVD, Reagan-straight-to-Clinton aesthetic full of neon vulgarity and deteriorated sonics." A writer from French music blog The Drone described Far Side Virtual as a concept album inspired by the ideas of hyperreality and simulacra from the post-modern cultural theorist Jean Baudrillard. Harper wrote, "Up until Far Side Virtual, many of James Ferraro's albums were impressionistic lo-fi portraits of bygone eras – perhaps on Far Side Virtual he decided to represent the present as is and then let nature take its course, over time, and do the aging for him. Returning to it in ten or twenty years time, we might discover that it was ironically a victim of its own futurist acceleration, and is now about as up-to-date as a ten-year-old carton of milk."

English music critic Simon Reynolds said that, while the album's song titles allude to the 21st century, the album is sonically reminiscent of the 1990s, and that Ferraro shares interest in that time period with contemporaries like Oneohtrix Point Never. Reynolds wrote, "Far Side Virtual seems to undertake an archaeology of the recent past, conjuring the onset of the internet revolution and 90s optimism about information technology. But that recent past could equally be a case of 'the long present' in so far as the digiculture ideology of convenience/instant access/maximization of options now permeates everyday life and is arguably where faint residues of utopianism persist in an otherwise gloomy and anxious culture."

== Critical reception ==
Professional ratings
Aggregate scores
Source	Rating
Metacritic	77/100
Review scores
Source	Rating
Drowned in Sound	7/10
Fact	4.5/5 marks
Pitchfork	7.6/10
Spin	6/10
Tiny Mix Tapes	3.5/5 marks

Far Side Virtual was met with greater critical attention than Ferraro's previous releases. Just over a year after its release, Marc Masters at Pitchfork wrote that Far Side Virtual "became Ferraro's most discussed and divisive effort, landing on year-end best-of lists as often as it got dismissed as a joke." At Metacritic, which assigns a normalized rating out of 100 to reviews from mainstream critics, the album received an average score of 77, which indicates "generally favorable reviews", based on seven reviews. Critics tended to agree that Far Side Virtual takes the state of 21st-century consumerism as its subject, but there was no consensus regarding whether Ferraro intended to satirize, criticize or embrace this condition. Brandon Soderberg said that the album's concept "seemed critic-proof, which was frustrating ... Negative reviews could be dismissed as the listeners simply not getting the joke."

The Wire published a favorable review by Joseph Stannard, in which he wrote "If it is an elaborate put-on—and I suspect Ferraro isn't averse to a chuckle at the expense of his audience—Far Side Virtual still feels like the culmination of numerous releases' worth of research and development. ... Whether or not its creator is giggling through a bong smoke haze, Far Side Virtual is a convincing evocation of the digital dreamtime." Stefan Wharton of Tiny Mix Tapes took the album as a statement about blurred boundaries between consumers and their technologies, citing the writing of Markus Giesler as a precedent: "Far Side Virtual succeeds in exciting the collective memory of that generation now so conjoined to its technological appendages." In Pitchfork's review, Soderberg wrote, "the songs here are exactly the same as what they're ostensibly parodying, which is bold and maybe even the point. ... You suddenly realize you're listening to 45 minutes of utilitarian music that doesn't really have a purpose. Can something be utopian and dystopian at the same time? Probably. Maybe even always."

Steve Shaw of Fact called the album "an intense immersive listening experience that is both deeply comforting and unsettling at the same time" and said "arguably, it is more a piece of art than a collection of music. ... Compositionally, Far Side Virtual is truly frenetic, nothing safe from Ferraro’s meddling, all elements completely malleable and at the mercy of his eccentric imagination." A Spin reviewer wrote that Ferraro "makes a glowing, glossy album out of everyday digital detritus. If you can wade through the excruciating sitar-synths, bank-lobby melodies, home-fitness techno, and infomercial drum breaks, Ferraro's playfulness blips into view."

=== Accolades ===
Far Side Virtual appeared on several "best of 2011" lists and features. In Tiny Mix Tapes' end-of-year wrap-up column on nostalgia in pop music, Jonathan Dean wrote, "You may want to throw Far Side Virtual against a wall upon hearing its relentlessly arch, kitschy blandness, but it manages to successfully turn pop against itself, which, like it or not, is a politically progressive project. Its pure, bold conceptualism stood out in a year that was dominated by the 'febrile sterility' of post-internet microgenres and tail-swallowing postmodernism." Music critic Jonah Weiner cited Far Side Virtual for his end-of-year article on contemporary protest songs, and called it "antagonizingly, alienatingly, wondrously bland." Fact named Hippos in Tanks the best label of the year, listing the signing of Ferraro and subsequent release of Far Side Virtual as one of its finest accomplishments.

Tiny Mix Tapes named Far Side Virtual the 21st best album of the year, summarized it as "hyperreal... frivolous... eerily familiar and scarily comfortable: pop structures moving one step closer toward the 'synthetic music box' from Huxley's Brave New World." Fact named it the sixth best album of the year, and called it "[t]he finest, most accessible example yet of James Ferraro's ability to turn the detritus and dreck of US pop/commercial culture into gold – or, at any rate, something stomach-turningly psychedelic, mentally disturbing yet oddly celebratory." Dummy named the album one of its "12 albums for 2011", and Ruth Saxelby concluded that Ferraro "neither celebrates nor critiques the internet's reign but simply observes it with deep fascination. Andy Warhol style, it reflects the ambiguity of consumer culture in the digital age back at us with a Pixar-animated wink." The album was placed at number 316 on The Village Voice Pazz & Jop poll, with votes from four critics.

Far Side Virtual topped The Wire's top 50 releases of 2011, a choice that proved to be polarizing among readers. Writing to elucidate the "low mandate" for the album, editor-in-chief Tony Herrington stated that only seven of 60 voters included Far Side Virtual on their lists, and no voters chose it as their personal favorite. Herrington said the choice was "entirely appropriate in a year in which the abundance of choice brought on by digital technology reached such a tipping point as to make genuine consensus impossible. ... you either swoon over the conceptual audacity of its deadpan appropriation of late capitalist-era corporate mood Muzak, or you think it's the worst record Dave Grusin never made." Tiny Mix Tapes' Dean wrote that after Far Side Virtual topped The Wire's list, "discerning music nerds have felt the imperative to step to either side of a line," and that Herrington's column "amounted to a retraction." While praising the magazine for its diverse taste, Seattle Weekly's Eric Grandy jokingly commented that it was "no surprise" that the "willfully obscurantist" magazine would top their list with a "winking Windows '97 soft-rock hellscape".

== Track listing ==
All tracks are written by James Ferraro.

No.	Title	Length
1.	"Linden Dollars"	1:57
2.	"Global Lunch"	2:13
3.	"Dubai Dream Tone"	1:49
4.	"Sim"	2:53
5.	"Bags"	3:25
6.	"PIXARnia and the Future of Norman Rockwell"	1:44
7.	"Palm Trees, Wi-Fi and Dream Sushi"	2:39
8.	"Fro Yo and Cellular Bits"	2:19
9.	"Google Poeises"	3:51
10.	"Starbucks, Dr. Seussism, and While Your Mac Is Sleeping"	2:25
11.	"Adventures in Green Foot Printing"	3:28
12.	"Dream On"	3:07
13.	"Earth Minutes"	4:17
14.	"Tomorrow's Baby of the Year"	1:49
15.	"Condo Pets"	3:31
16.	"Solar Panel Smile"	4:08
Total length:		45:29
