= Hippos in Tanks =

Electronic music label

- Founded: 2010
- Founder: Barron Machat; Travis Woolsey; Don Andrews
- Defunct: 2015
- Status: Defunct
- Distributors: Sony Music; Universal Music; Redeye; Genepool
- Genre: Electronic; avant-garde; experimental pop
- Country of origin: United States
- Location: Los Angeles

Hippos in Tanks was a record label founded in 2010 by Barron Machat and Travis Woolsey.

The label specialized in electronic music. It was named the best label of 2011 by Fact.

Following the death of Machat in 2015, The Fader praised the label for "laying the groundwork to an alternative template for the avant-garde" into the 21st century during the post-internet era. The label is no longer active.

== History ==
In 2009, Machat and Woolsey, who met while working at an online company in Los Angeles, California, hosted a radio show on Saturdays between 2-4am on KXLU called Hippos in Tanks. It was named after the novel by Jack Kerouac and William S. Burroughs titled And the Hippos Were Boiled in Their Tanks.

After leaving the company to work on their label full-time, Hippos in Tanks released their first EP from Von Haze in June 2010 after having travelled between England and New York City in the spring of 2010. In the summer of 2011, Woolsey left the label with Machat staying on as CEO.

According to a 2014 interview with Dean Blunt, Hippos in Tanks had sued him for $10,000 over contract disputes. The dispute was resolved when his label at the time, Rough Trade Records, paid Hippos in Tanks the amount sought.

The label became associated with internet age experimental pop that drew on disparate sources such as new wave, avant-garde noise, R&B, and techno. The label released projects by artists such as Grimes, James Ferraro, Autre Ne Veut, Laurel Halo, Hype Williams, Arca, and d'Eon.

Machat died in a car crash in Miami, Florida, on April 8, 2015 aged 27. The label has been inactive since Machat's passing.

== Artists / alumni ==
- ADR
- Arca
- Autre Ne Veut
- Bodyguard
- Dean Blunt
- d'Eon
- Games
- Gatekeeper
- Goth Money
- Grimes
- Hype Williams
- Inga Copeland
- James Ferraro
- Laurel Halo
- Nguzunguzu
- Outer Limitz
- Physical Therapy
- Sleep ∞ Over
- Triad God
- Von Haze
- White Car
- Wilder
