= Weed420 =

Venezuelan experimental music collective

- Origin: Valencia, Venezuela
- Genres: Epic collage; plunderphonics; vaporwave; deconstructed club; IDM; reggaeton; salsa; hexD; cloud rap (early); trap (early)
- Years active: 2021–present
- Label: Deprerreo
- Members: Glitch; Swan; Álvaro; DJ Juan; Samuel; frowningato; Eduardo; Zamora
- Past members: Gabriel
- Website: weed420x.com

Weed420 (Spanish pronunciation: [ˈwid ˈkwa.tɾo ˈbein.te]) is a Venezuelan experimental music collective formed in 2021. Its early work consisted of bitcrushed remixes of Venezuelan trap songs. Weed420's website listed epic collage, hexD, deconstructed club, cloud rap, reggaeton and salsa among the tags used to describe its music. Agustín Puszczyk of Bandcamp Daily characterized the collective's sound as a Venezuelan reinterpretation of vaporwave and the most authentic "meme music". Archie Forde of The Quietus characterized the group as making "frenetic and baleful IDM that never has less than seven things going on at once", describing its sound as combining samples from Latin club music with hardstyle drums, distorted bass, field recordings and synthesizers. Resident Advisor described its music as combining noise, lo-fi and maximalist vaporwave influences with cloud rap, ambient music, perreo, salsa, and chopped and screwed.

== History ==
=== Formation and early releases (2021–2023) ===
Weed420 formed around 2021 in Valencia, Venezuela, as an online music collective. As of March 2026, its founding members were Glitch (gL1tChhhvkVmv), Gabriel, Álvaro (djALVARO), all from Valencia, and Swan (swan duhr), from Falcón, Venezuela. Agustín Puszczyk of Bandcamp Daily claims that the group "shuffle their line-up with each release". They all coordinate its creative process through social media groups like WhatsApp, Discord, and Facebook. Early interactions within the collective involved sharing personal production demos, discussing video games (such as Counter-Strike, Call of Duty: Modern Warfare 3, and God of War), and discovering new music in Rate Your Music.

Weed420's earliest releases consisted of bitcrushed remixes of Venezuelan trap songs uploaded to SoundCloud and Bandcamp, which would then compile into a trilogy of mixtapes titled Rare Venezuelan Real Trampa, the last of them being RVRT 3. Members of Weed420 have cited Dismiss Yourself as an important initial influence on the collective's music (which introduced the members to the HexD microgenre). They have also named artists such as Yabujin, Leroy, Nanoray, and Machine Girl among their influences. During the production of RVRT 3 in 2023, DJ Juan (domingodemierda), from Valencia, and Samuel (samuelpochi), from Asunción, Paraguay, joined the collective, the latter joining after connecting with Glitch on a Discord server. The collective also used shitposting on social media to promote its releases. That year, their desire to form a "real" band grew, heavily inspired by the boy band Brockhampton, though, according to them, it should not be taken literally. They said they started feeling the urge to make music, but they did not like doing it alone.

=== Transition and Malandreo Conceptual (2024) ===
In 2024, they released Malandreo Conceptual, a mixtape described by Puszczyk as a parody and tribute to reggaeton that marked a shift from its earlier trap and cloud rap releases. The mixtape addressed themes surrounding Venezuelan street culture and the social term malandro, functioning as a critique of privileged individuals attempting to appropriate street culture, seeking instead to highlight the economic realities and daily survival of average Venezuelans. The members identified Malandreo Conceptual as a turning point in defining their collective sound and establishing their decision to continue making music as a group. Following its release, Puszczyk reported that the mixtape received coverage on music forums and year-end rankings. In late 2024, frowningato (gato) joined the group.

=== Amor de Encava, NTS mixes and international touring (2025–present) ===
Due to economic instability and mass migration from Venezuela, the collective did not meet in person until 2025. Their debut album Amor de Encava (2025) has been described as epic collage and plunderphonics. Released on 10 March 2025, the album reworks Latin American popular music, including reggaeton and salsa, and was structured around the cultural role of the encava, a line of public transit minibuses produced by Ensamblaje de Carrocerías Valencia since 1962 that serve as a primary mode of transportation in Venezuela. Glitch served as the collective's creative director and designed the cover of the album. According to Álvaro, DJ Sueldomínimo introduced the collective to the Catalan label Deprerreo, which distributed the release. Weed420 released two promotional video projects on YouTube alongside the album. One of them, titled Official Visualizer, was produced by members Glitch and Swan. The 40-minute animated video accompanies the full album with digital collages incorporating footage from video games, including Grand Theft Auto: San Andreas and The Legend of Zelda, driving simulators, and archival salsa performance recordings. The album was released to international critical acclaim from music publications; Vogue México y Latinoamérica named it the third best Latin album of 2025, Time Out placed it 14th on its general year-end list, and Rolling Stone included it among the top Latin releases of the year, placing it 29th. The record also received critical recognition in publications including Pitchfork, Bandcamp Daily, Remezcla, and Folha de S.Paulo.

Following the release of Amor de Encava, Weed420 released a series of DJ mixes, demos, and singles. Eduardo (h0tn1k), from the United States, and Zamora joined the group in mid-2025. In September 2025, Weed420 released Miren Miren Guayo..., a four-track mix for NTS Radio. Richard Villegas of Remezcla described it as combining experimental sound collage with club music, incorporating elements of grunge, perreo and ambient music alongside samples of Latin pop musicians like Sinaka, Justin Quiles, and Daniela Romo. Weed420 released another NTS mix on 21 October titled Fotos Varias. The release was ranked 70th in The Quietus's year-end list of reissues, compilations, live albums and mixes. Writing for the publication, Archie Forde described Fotos Varias as an exercise in pushing the boundaries of sound and digital audio production. In December 2025, Weed420 released their debut live album Esto No Es un Show. The release featured extended instrumental compositions, some reaching up to seventeen minutes in length, and incorporated live arrangements of earlier pieces, such as "O Santa Rosa / Parejas", from Miren Miren Guayo... Alan Baez of Remezcla described "O Santa Rosa" as combining ambient textures and post-rock elements with industrial percussion and vocal samples.

In April 2026, Weed420 embarked on its first international tour, with performances across Europe. On April 8, the collective performed at the Foyer of the Bourse de Commerce in Paris, opening for the American experimental duo Los Thuthanaka (Chuquimamani-Condori and Joshua Chuquimia Crampton). Two days later, they played the PAARD II hall as part of the 15th edition of the Rewire Festival in The Hague, Netherlands. They also performed at Electrónica en Abril at La Casa Encendida in Madrid, Spain, where guest producer Dexonia joined them onstage for a live remix of "Alien", a track from Weed420's mixtape "Estoy Viviendo" (2026). Later that year, the collective embarked on a further European tour, performing between October and November 2026 across Portugal, Germany, Poland, Croatia, Austria, Denmark, Norway, Sweden, Belgium, Switzerland, Spain and the Netherlands.

== Members ==
Current members

- Glitch (gL1tChhhvkVmv) (2021–present)
- Swan (swan duhr) (2021–present)
- Álvaro (djALVARO) (2021–present)
- DJ Juan (domingodemierda) (2023–present)
- Samuel (samuelpochi) (2023–present)
- frowningato (gato) (2024–present)
- Eduardo (h0tn1k) (2025–present)
- Zamora (2025–present)

Former members

- Gabriel (2021–?)

== Discography ==
Selected discography listed on the collective's official website.

=== Studio albums ===
- Amor de Encava (2025)

=== Live albums ===
- Esto No Es un Show (2025)

=== Mixtapes ===
- Malandreo Conceptual (2024)
- "Estoy Viviendo" (2026)

=== Extended plays ===
- Evilchanga (2024)

=== DJ mixes ===
- RVRT 3 (2023)
- Miren Miren Guayo... (2025)
- Fotos Varias [NTS] (2025)
- Dedicado a [NTS] (2025)

=== Singles ===
- "Vámonos de Aquí" (2026)
