= Rewire Festival =

Annual international music festival

- Genre: Electronic music, experimental music
- Locations: The Hague, Netherlands
- Years active: 2012- present
- Website: www.rewirefestival.nl/

Rewire Festival is an annual international festival for adventurous music, held since 2011 in The Hague, Netherlands. The festival presents a broad program with a focus on contemporary electronic music, neo-classical, new jazz, experimental pop, sound art and multidisciplinary collaborations. It has featured artists such as Laurie Anderson, James Holden, Godspeed You! Black Emperor, Ricardo Villalobos, Arca & Jesse Kanda, Nils Frahm, Animal Collective, Nina Kraviz, and The Field (the band). The 2019 edition took place on March 29, 30 and 31. Venues differ from churches, old factories and abandoned spaces to the more institutional theatres and pop venues. According to Resident Advisor, "[The festival] prides itself on musical diversity first and foremost."

Besides the festival, the organization is focussing on presenting several other affiliated activities year round.

== Previous editions ==
Rewire 2024

33EMYBW & Joey Holder / Aïsha Devi / Alabaster DePlume / Amirtha Kidambi's Elder Ones / Amor Muere / Andrius Arutiunian / Annea Lockwood / Arushi Jain / Astrid Sonne / Atelier Impopulaire with Blacks' Myths / Aunty Rayzor / Autechre / Beans / Ben Frost feat. Greg Kubacki & Tarik Barri / Ben Vida with Yarn/Wire & Nina Dante / Blacks' Myths / Brìghde Chaimbeul / Brother May / Carl Gari & Abdullah Miniawy / Carmen Jaci / Caz Egelie & Jesse Strikwerda ‘A Staged Slumber’ / Cello Octet Amsterdam & Nick Verstand / Chuquimamani-Condori / Clara de Asís / Cole Pulice / comforter2 / Concepción Huerta / Crystallmess / Deli Girls / Devon Rexi / Dialect / FUMU / Gazelle Twin / goat (jp) / Gordan / H31R / Henk & Melle ‘Baumhaus’ / Henk Schut ‘Lost Sound’ / HHY & The Macumbas / HiTech / HUUUM / Iceboy Violet / Jeanine Verloop / Jenny Hval / Jlin & Florence To / Julia Holter / Ka Baird / Kaðlín Sara Ólafsdóttir / Keeley Forsyth / Laura Ortman / Lila Tirando a Violeta & Sin Maldita / Liliane Chlela / Lolo & Sosaku / Lonnie Holley / Loraine James feat. Fyn Dobson & Alessandra Leone / Louis Braddock Clarke / Marco Fusinato / Maria W Horn & Sara Parkman / Martin Messier / Maxime Denuc / Maya Al Khaldi & Sarouna / Maya Shenfeld & Pedro Maia / MAZE Ensemble & Annea Lockwood / Mette Ingvartsen & Will Guthrie / Meuko! Meuko! & NONEYE / Mhm, Mhm / MIZU / ML Buch / Myra-Ida van der Veen / Myriam Bleau / NAH / Nailah Hunter / Nandita Kumar / Neon Dance, Jóhann Jóhannsson & Yair Elazar Glotman, narration by Tilda Swinton / Nick León & Ezra Miller / Niecy Blues / No Plexus / Oceanic feat. Tharim Cornelisse ‘Choral Feeling’ / ojoo / Olof Dreijer / One Leg One Eye / Oneohtrix Point Never / Orphax & MAZE Ensemble / Pelle Schilling / Phét Phét Phét / Phew / Phew & Oren Ambarchi / Plus44Kaligula / PYUR / Quade / Rafael Toral / Raphael Rogiński / ROLROLROL / Roméo Poirier & Ohme / Saint Abdullah & Jason Nazary / Shovel Dance Collective / Simo Cell / Slauson Malone 1 / Sockethead / Sophia Bulgakova / Speakers Corner Quartet / Stephanie Pan & Ensemble Klang / Sun Kit / Sunn O))) / Svitlana Nianio / Tadleeh / Tara Clerkin Trio / Tara Pasveer / The Necks / The Sleep of Reason Produces Monsters / Titanic / Van Boom / Venus Ex Machina / Yarn/Wire performs the music of Annea Lockwood / Youmna Saba

Rewire 2019

Actress & Young Paint / Adam Harper / Alex Zhang Hungtai / All Sounds Considered / Anat Spiegel / Andrea Belfi & Valerio Tricoli / Angel Bat Dawid / Angel-Ho / Animistic Beliefs / Anna Mikkola / Annelies Monseré / Ash Koosha / Astrid Sonne / Aurélie Nyirabikali Lierman & But What About / Bamba Pana & Makaveli / Bill Orcutt / Bob Sturm / CCL / Chris Corsano & Bill Orcutt / Clara! Y Maoupa / Creative Sound Lab / CTM / CURL / De Methode / Diamanda Dramm / Dianne Verdonk / Doon Kanda / Elaine Mitchener / Eli Keszler / Emmanuel Biard / Enrique Manjavacas / Federico Campagna / Flohio / Foodman / Free Fall Improvisers Orchestra / Geomancer / Giant Swan / Haron & Anne Veinberg / Henry Vega & Jan Willem Troost / Iona Fortune & NYX / Ipek Gorgun / Jasmín / Jason Sharp / Jennifer Walshe & Memo Akten / Jesse Osborne-Lanthier / Jessica Pratt / Jessica Sligter / Jlin & Company Wayne McGregor / John Bence / Julia Holter Duo / Justin Bennett / Kampire / Kelly Moran / Kit Downes & Ensemble Klang / Lafawndah / Laura Agnusdei / Laurel Halo / Lotic / Low / Lucrecia Dalt & Alessandra Leone / Maria W Horn / Mark Fell / Mark IJzerman / Maurice Louca Elephantine Band / Mette Henriette / Mick Grierson / Mohammad Reza Mortazavi / Nicolás Jaar & Group / Nicolás Jaar presents Free 2 Move / Niels Broos & Jamie Peet / No history in a room filled with people with funny names 5 / Nosedrip / Obol Le / Otim Alpha / Party on the CAPS / Patrick Higgins / Pierre Bastien & Tomaga / Puce Mary / RAFF / Rebecca Fiebrink / Red Brut / Refree / Rian Treanor / Róisín Loughran / Sébastien Robert / Sega Bodega / Sinjin Hawke & Zora Jones / Sosena Gebre Eyesus / Sote / Spekki Webu / Spinifex / Stekkerdoos / Tanya Tagaq / Tashi Wada Group / Thor Magnusson / Tim Hecker & Konoyo Ensemble / Tirzah / upsammy / Violet / vtgnike / Walled Unwalled / William Basinski & Lawrence English / Xiu Xiu / YEK: Mohammad Reza Mortazavi & Burnt Friedman / Yona ft. Ash Koosha / Yves Tumor / Zeno van den Broek / Zoe Reddy

Rewire 2018

AMMAR 808 / Antenes / Arto Lindsay & Zs / Avalon Emerson / Beatriz Ferreyra / Ben Vince / Boi Mesa / Carmen & Matthew Schoen / Chino Amobi / Clifford Sage / CocoonDance / Daniel O'Sullivan & Dream Lion Ensemble / Deena Abdelwahed / E. Jane / Ellen Arkbro + Zinc & Copper / Elysia Crampton / FAKA / Fatima Al Qadiri / Floating Points / Frances Morgan / Gagi Petrovic / Gary Hill / Glice & Dieter Vandoren / Golden Retriever / Identified Patient / Irreversible Entanglements / Ivan Vukosavljević & Il Hoon Son / JASSS / James Holden & The Animal Spirits / Jasper Stadhouders' Polyband / Jeremy Gilbert / Ji Youn Kang / Jon Davies / Joshua Abrams & Natural Information Society / Juju & Jordash / Juliana Huxtable / Kaitlyn Aurelia Smith / Kareem Lotfy / Karen Gwyer / Kepla / LYZZA / Lanark Artefax / Laura Agnusdei / Laurence Pike / Laurie Anderson / Le poème électronique / Legacy Russell / Lori Napoleon / MHYSA / Marija Bozinovska Jones / Maryam Saleh, Maurice Louca & Tamer Abu Ghazaleh / Mia Zabelka, James Plotkin and Benjamin Finger / Music Hackspace / Mykki Blanco / Nadah El Shazly / Nadia Struiwigh / New Emergences / Nina Kraviz / Ninos Du Brasil / Oberman / Oceanic / PAUS / Panda Bear / Park Jiha / Paul Twin / Quantum Natives / Ragazze Quartet / Raphael Vanoli / Royal Conservatoire String Ensemble / Rupert Clervaux & Ben Vince / SCRAAATCH / Širom / SUUNS / Stephan Meidell / Sugai Ken / Sven Kacirek / Syncom Data / The Hague Record Fair / The Music of Stranger Things by Kyle Dixon and Michael Stein / The School of Noise / The Thing / Tom Rogerson / Tristan Perich / UUUU / Umfang / Underbelly Books & Vinyl / Vicky Chow / Visionist + Pedro Maia / Volvox / Yon Eta / ZA! / Zimpel/Ziolek / Ziúr

Rewire 2017

Adele Cutting / AGF & Kubra Khademi / Anni Nöps / Arca & Jesse Kanda / Aurora Halal / Baiba Yurkevich / Bertus Gerssen / Blanck Mass / CAO / Carla dal Forno / Cloud Becomes Your Hand / Concertzender Live / Croatian Amor / Daniel Lanois / Daniel Wohl + Slagwerk Den Haag + Matangi Quartet / Darien Brito / Das Ensemble Ohne Eigenschaften / David Housden / Dazion / DSR Lines / Forest Swords / Gábor Lázár / GAIKA / Greg Fox / Helena Hauff / HOEK & Dieter Vandoren / Horse Lords / Igor C Silva & Trash Panda Collective / Jace Clayton / Jace Clayton presents Uproot / Jameszoo Quintet / Jeff Mills & Tony Allen / Jessy Lanza / John Broomhall / Kassel Jaeger / Kassem Mosse / Kobe van Cauwenberghe / Lorenzo Senni / Moor Mother / N.M.O. / NAH / Nimbus 3000 / Oliver Coates / Paul Weir / Pete Harden & Ensemble Klang / Peter Zinovieff & Lucy Railton / Pharmakon / Pussy Mothers / Radian / 2017 DJ-team / Ryan Teague Ensemble / S.T. Cordell / Sarathy Korwar / Sex Swing / SHXCXCHCXSH / Slowdive / Smudged Toads / SØS Gunver Ryberg / SUMS: Kangding Ray & Barry Burns (Mogwai) / Swans / The Chi Factory/ Peter Zinovieff / These Hidden Hands / This Is Not This Heat / Tony Conrad / Torus & Nikki Hock / Wing / Waclaw Zimpel / Willem Marijs + Gert-Jan Prins + Peter van Bergen / Wolf Eyes / Zs

Rewire 2016

Alessandro Bosetti / Amnesia Scanner / Animal Collective / Anna Meredith / Ash Koosha / Babyfather / Bas van Huizen / Battles / Beatrice Dillon / Ben UFO / Brokenchord / Chris Watson / Cocktail Party Effect / Colleen / Elektrovolt / Emily Wells / Ensemble Economique / Factory Floor / Félicia Atkinson / Gazelle Twin: Kingdom Come / Gebben / Gerri Jäger / Glice / Hilde Marie Holsen / In Code [Wentink, Snoei, Hulskamp] / ITPDWIP / J(ay).A.D / James Holden & Maalem Houssam Guinia / James Welburn / Jlin / Kaitlyn Aurelia Smith / Kara-Lis Coverdale + MFO / Lakker present Struggle & Emerge / Lena Willikens / Leo Svirsky / Lussuria / Matana Roberts / Mica Levi & Stargaze present Under The Skin / Michel Banabila & Oene van Geel / Mikael Seifu / Mykki Blanco / Norberto Lobo & João Lobo Sextet / Not Waving / Olivier Messiaen: Pierre Henry - Timbres-durées / Peverelist / Pierre Alexandre Tremblay / Poppy Ackroyd / Ricardo Donoso / Roly Porter & MFO / Royal Conservatoire presents KHZ kollektiv / Teho Teardo & Blixa Bargeld / Total Freedom / Truss / Vessel + Black Rain + Pete Swanson / Via App / Xiu Xiu plays Twin Peaks

Rewire 2015

96wlrd / Aïsha Devi / Akka / Alessandro Cortini / Antenna / Blue Daisy / Bronze Teeth / Casperelectronics / Chris Corsano & Mette Rasmussen / Cliff Lothar / Cloudface / Dandana / De Tuinen / DJ Sniff / DJ Stingray / Evian Christ / Fetter / FilosofischeStilte / Gaby Felten / Garoeda / Gerben Louw / Gnod / Godspeed You! Black Emperor / Grouper / Gut & Irmler / HOEK / Holly Herndon / IVVVO / Jac Berrocal + David Fenech + Vincent Epplay / Jenny Hval & Susanna / Julianna Barwick Expanded / Klankman / Leslie Nagel / Lorn / Marsman / Mbongwana Star / MGBG / Mischa Daams / Neneh Cherry & Rocketnumbernine / Omer Eilam / Oren Ambarchi / Organisms / Paul Panhuysen / Pearson Sound / Powell / Ron Morelli / RP Boo / Sara Pape García / Saskia Lankhoorn / Kate Moore / Shabazz Palaces / Shit and Shine / Siinai / Sima Kim / Stoka Ensemble / Svengalisghost / TCF / The Bug / The Cult of Dom Keller / The Void Pointers / Thomas Ankersmit / Tomaga / Tomas Järmyr / Total Life / Unit Moebius Anonymous / Yara van der Velden / Yodok III

Rewire 2014

James Holden presents The Inheritors live / Tatu Rönkkö & Efterklang / Henrik Schwarz & Nik Bärtsch / Colin Stetson / Bohren & der Club of Gore / Simian Mobile Disco / Gold Panda / The Field / Herman Kolgen & Bl!ndman / Vessel / Ital / Jozef van Wissem / Chantal Acda / DNMF [Dead Neanderthals & Machinefabriek] / Maarten Vos & Greg Haines / Gardland / Albert van Abbe / Fiium Shaarrk / Klara Lewis / Hydras Dream (Anna von Hausswolff & Matti Bye) / Wanda Group / Greg Haines solo / Koreless / Dauwd / Von Nohrfeldt Ensemble / Lee Gamble / Siinai / Noveller / Valerio Tricoli / Drvg Cvltvre / Will Samson / Lee Noble / Bram Stadhouders / KRK / Aron Birtalan / Moritz Alive / Geritz / Kaffa / Void of Sound / Dotlights / Wouter van Veldhoven / Cabaret Contemporain / Inga Copeland / Kode9

Rewire 2013

751 / Baths / Black Marble / Cloud Boat / Food + Fennesz / Holly Herndon / Iceage / Intergalactic Gary / James Ferraro / Jerusalem in My Heart / Julia Holter / Kelpe / Lone [cancelled ]/ Loyu / Lucrecia Dalt / Lumisokea / Modeselektor / Moon Ate the Dark / Nathan Fake / Nils Petter Molvær & Moritz von Oswald / Ricardo Villalobos & Max Loderbauer present Re:ECM live / Seams / Stellar OM Source / Still Serious Nic / Tape / The KVB / Traxx / Valgeir Sigurðsson

Rewire 2012

Alberto Novello a.k.a. JesterN / Alex Smoke presents Wraetlic / Black Rain / Deaf Center / DIIV / Errors / Filosofische Stilte / Handsome Thomas & Still Serious Nic / Henry Vega & Anat Spiegel / H-SIK / Halls / Jacob 2-2 / Juffage / Kangding Ray / Knalpot / Kreng / Laurel Halo / Legowelt / Lichens / Lotus Plaza / Lukid / Mark du Mosch / Micachu & The Shapes / Nosaj Thing [cancelled] / Palmbomen live / patten / Pete Swanson / Presk / Rocketnumbernine / Shackleton / Some Clouds / Stelios Manousakis / Torus / Xosar / Young Magic

Rewire 2011

Andy Stott / Applescal / Bomb Diggy Crew / Comfort Fit / Dagga Dagga / Daniel Haaksman / Dirty Beaches / Dorian Concept / Eklin / Holy Other / Hype Williams / I am Oak / Juha / Kuedo / Martyn / Narain Ashad / Nils Frahm & Anne Müller / oOoOO / Patrice Bäumel / Peter Broderick & Machinefabriek / Plaid / Rustie / Sylvain Chauveau / Tonik / Tropics / Vondelpark / Walls / Washed Out

== See also ==
- List of electronic music festivals
