= Paradiso (Chino Amobi album) =

Studio album by Chino Amobi
- Released: May 5, 2017
- Genre: Electronic; avant-garde
- Length: 68:35
- Label: Non Worldwide; Uno NYC

Chino Amobi chronology
Paradiso (2017)	Eroica (2024)

Paradiso is the debut studio album by American record producer Chino Amobi. It was released on May 5, 2017, through Non Worldwide and Uno NYC. The Wire named it the release of the year.

== Background ==
Chino Amobi is an American record producer based in Virginia. Paradiso is his debut studio album. It includes contributions from Rabit, Dutch E Germ, Aurel Haize Obogbo, Haleek Maul, Embaci, Full Carnage, Jesse Hlebo, Benja SL, Rena Anakwe, Therochelle Moore, FAKA, Lee Jones, Johnny Utterback, Moro, and Elysia Crampton. The album's cover art depicts Amobi's imaginary ID card. The album was released on May 5, 2017, through Non Worldwide and Uno NYC.

Rick Farin directed an animated short film, Welcome to Paradiso (City in the Sea), in 2018.

== Critical reception ==
Professional ratings
Review scores
Source	Rating
Pitchfork	7.7/10
Resident Advisor	4.0/5
Tiny Mix Tapes	4/5 stars

Andrew Ryce of Resident Advisor described Paradiso as "one of the definitive records of the recent explosion of experimental club music, even if, on the album itself, there's no club music at all." Colin Joyce of Vice wrote, "Many futurist producers attempt to meld genres, but Amobi's attempts to do so feel uniquely bleak." However, he added, "Even amid the terror, there's a sense of strange celebration, as seemingly anyone who's ever been in Amobi's musical orbit makes an appearance on the record." Jes Skolnik of Bandcamp Daily stated, "We've spoken much of the dystopian present this year as a culture, but there's no other work I can think of that captures the brittle, brutal uncertainty that is the wage of centuries of colonialism and imperialism like this vivid record."

=== Accolades ===
Year-end lists for Paradiso
Publication	List	Rank	Ref.
Bandcamp Daily	The Best Albums of 2017	60	
Noisey	The 36 Best Overlooked Albums of 2017	—	
PopMatters	The 20 Best Electronic Albums of 2017	11	
Tiny Mix Tapes	2017: Favorite 50 Music Releases	24	
The Wire	Releases of the Year (Rewind 2017)	1	

== Track listing ==
Paradiso track listing
No.	Title	Length
1.	"Law I (The City in the Sea)"	3:22
2.	"Gænova"	1:59
3.	"Blood of the Covenant"	3:36
4.	"Negative Fire III"	3:50
5.	"The Failed Sons and Daughters of Fantasia"	3:15
6.	"Blackout"	3:06
7.	"Antikeimenon"	4:10
8.	"Nkisi (Edit)"	2:49
9.	"Eigengrau (Children of Hell II)"	4:13
10.	"Law II (Demolition)"	1:18
11.	"Polizei"	3:58
12.	"White Mætel"	3:00
13.	"White Mætel Narrative"	3:11
14.	"Radical Zero"	1:11
15.	"Paradiso"	7:02
16.	"Law III (Adam)"	2:24
17.	"The Floating World Pt. 1"	1:46
18.	"The Floating World Pt. 2"	2:09
19.	"Dixie Shrine"	4:41
20.	"Kollaps"	4:08
21.	"End (The City in the Sea)"	3:16
Total length:		68:35

Notes

- All track titles are stylized in all caps.
