= Halcyon Veil =

Record label

Halcyon Veil is an American independent record label founded in 2015 by Rabit and Lane Stewart. Originally based between Houston, Texas, and Los Angeles, the label was associated with a hybridized style of club music sometimes described as "post-club," releasing work by artists including IVVVO, MHYSA, Angel-Ho, and 700 Bliss. The label's output has since broadened to include indie rock, hip-hop, and pop, continuing a consistent focus on music resistant to genre classification. Resident Advisor described the label as having grown from an outpost for experimental club music into a freeform, community-oriented network, while Bandcamp Daily characterized it as a distributed entity that, while rooted in Houston, has "always looked outward, almost like a pirate radio station."

== History ==
Halcyon Veil was formed in 2015, after Stewart and Burton met on Twitter, Burton proposing starting a label within minutes of meeting in person. The label's debut release was Angel-Ho's EP Ascension the same year. Its early catalog was closely associated with the "deconstructed" or "post-club" scenes of the mid-2010s, situating the label alongside a wider network of artists including Chino Amobi and Elysia Crampton. Rabit and Chino Amobi's The Great Game: Freedom from Mental Poisoning, released on the label in 2015, was later cited by critic Matthew Phillips as a defining work of what he termed "neofuturism," an aesthetic he traced through artists including Arca, Lotic, and Holly Herndon. By the end of the decade, the label's roster had expanded to include artists such as IVVVO, whose 2019 single "Forever Your Mouth" was played by Aphex Twin during his Coachella set that year.

== Artists ==
- Agazero
- Angel-Ho
- Angels in America
- Bapari
- $quib
- CECILIA
- DJ Haram
- Europa
- IVVVO
- LA Timpa
- Lol K
- MHYSA
- Moor Mother
- nudo
- Rabit
- Rat Section
- SAUSHA
- Tati au Miel
- 700 Bliss
