= Epic collage =

Sound collage music genre

- Stylistic origins: Sound collage; deconstructed club; EDM; mashup; pop; electronic
- Cultural origins: Early 2010s, United States

Other topics
- Avant-garde music; Post-Internet music

Epic collage is a subgenre of sound collage that emerged in the early 2010s within experimental electronic and post-Internet music. The term was originally coined by journalist Adam Harper to describe the work of artists such as Elysia Crampton (as E+E), Total Freedom and Chino Amobi (as Diamond Hearted Black Boy). Drawing primarily on deconstructed club and electronic dance music, epic collage combines the sampling of pop music and other recorded media with electronic elements, noise and sound effects.

== Characteristics ==
Epic collage is a form of avant-garde sample-based music that combines fragments of pop music with sound effects, noise and electronic sounds. Its compositions incorporate samples and sound palettes associated with radio broadcasts, video games, film and other forms of contemporary media. Other sound effects range from vehicle engines, weapon-like sounds, screams, toilet-flushing sounds, birdsong, and bell tones. The genre mainly draws on elements of deconstructed club and electronic dance music.

The term epic collage was coined by the experimental music journalist Adam Harper in his May 2014 column for The Fader, titled "System Focus: Adam Harper on the Divine Surrealism of Epic Collage Producers E+E, Total Freedom and Diamond Black Hearted Boy". He used the term to describe the music of Elysia Crampton (as E+E), Total Freedom, Chino Amobi (as Diamond Hearted Black Boy), and other artists in their network. The term referenced the painting style of musicians and painters Amobi and Seychelles Allah. However, musician Lotic questioned the meaning of the term, arguing that combining disparate sounds was not an overintellectualized concept but a natural byproduct of "grow[ing] up with a laptop [and] constantly taking little tiny things from everywhere".

== History ==
=== Precursors and influences ===
The use of non-musical sounds in experimental composition predates epic collage. Italian Futurist Luigi Russolo advocated incorporating sounds associated with modern industrial life into music in his 1913 manifesto The Art of Noises. In the 1940s and 1950s, French composers Pierre Schaeffer and Pierre Henry developed musique concrète, a form of experimental music based on recorded sounds manipulated through techniques such as tape editing and loop. An earlier work identified as a precursor to epic collage is Olivier Messiaen's Timbres-Durées (1952), an experimental electronic composition created in collaboration with Henry. The work contained recorded everyday sounds, including running water. Since the 1960s and 1970s, Jamaican dub producers and DJs such as King Tubby and Lee "Scratch" Perry developed studio techniques that turned the mixing console as an instrument, manipulating and reworking existing songs.

Further influences that shaped epic collage include hip-hop sampling, plunderphonics, and 2000s mashup culture pioneered by artists like Erol Alkan, 2manydjs, and Girl Talk. Plunderphonics uses samples from existing recordings as compositional material, while mashups combine elements of different tracks, often including vocals from one recording and instrumental backing from another. Epic collage developed alongside a broader experimental club culture associated with party series and collectives such as GHE20G0TH1K in New York. Founded in 2009, the party brought together hip-hop, Jersey club, industrial and other musical influences through experimental DJ sets, and was associated with artists including Total Freedom. Janus, established as a club night in 2012 in Berlin, similarly developed a network of experimental electronic musicians like Lotic, M.E.S.H., and Kablam. Epic collage emerged in the context of post-Internet art in music, which explored the cultural and aesthetic implications of networked media. Vaporwave was a related development in this context, with James Ferraro's Far Side Virtual (2011) and releases by artists such as ADR and Internet Club incorporating sounds and scenes associated with the critique of late capitalism and consumer technology.

=== 2010s–present ===
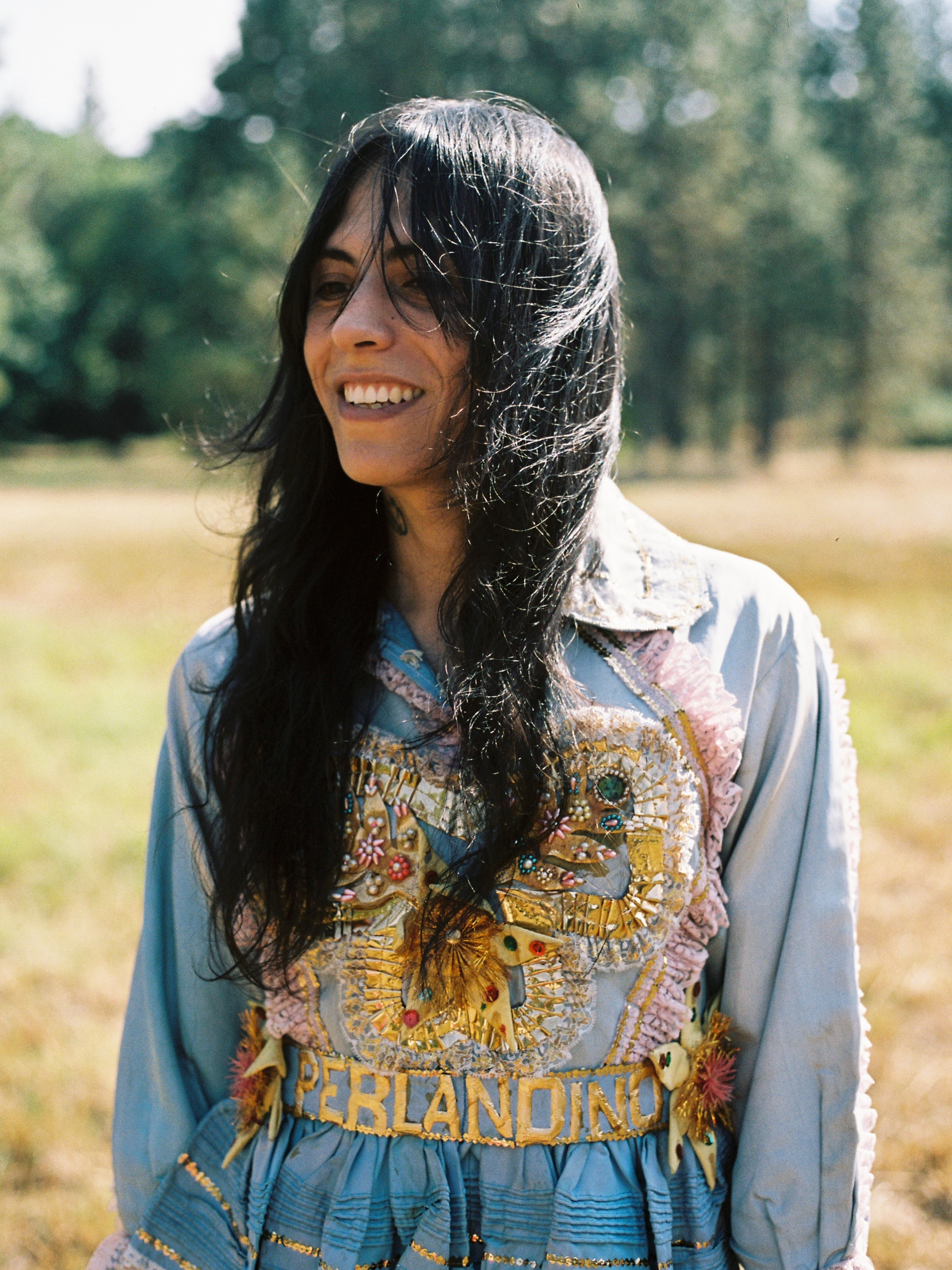
Elysia Crampton

Harper and critics retroactively regard that the epic collage scene developed around releases including Elysia Crampton's The Light That You Gave Me to See You (2013), as E+E, Blasting Voice (2012), a compilation album made by Total Freedom, and Father, Protect Me. (2013), a full-length cassette by Chino Amobi, as Diamond Hearted Black Boy. Crampton was described by journalist Agustín Wicki as having helped pioneer the epic collage style since the early 2010s. Blasting Voice brought together music by several artists associated with the scene, such as E+E, Diamond Black Hearted Boy, Felix Lee, Violence, Nguzunguzu, and James Ferraro (as Bodyguard). Amobi was a co-founder of the NON Worldwide music label and collective (along with Angel-Ho and Nkisi), where their music fused digital collage and identity politics to subvert white heteronormative narratives.

The Baltimore-based artist Alexander Deranian, who records as Sentinel, self-released his debut album Hybrid in 2014. Sentinel's musical style, in the words of Harper, exemplified a "hi-tech" approach to the epic collage genre, and the album explored exaggerated, mass-marketed masculinity through a dark aesthetic. In 2015, Crampton released American Drift, their debut album under their own name. The album explored themes including Virginian history, geology, brownness, queer Indigenous narratives and two-spirit histories. The Fader's Aimee Cliff called "Petrichrist", a track from the album, as "the most epic 'epic collage' from the artist". Their follow-up album, Elysia Crampton Presents: Demon City (2016), continued their work within epic collage and was dedicated to Bolivian revolutionary Bartolina Sisa.

In 2024, Amobi released Eroica, which Jordan Darville of The Fader called it "an epic collage masterpiece". Darville compared the genre's emergence in 2014 with its continued relevance a decade later, characterizing it as "the sound of now". The Venezuelan group Weed420's album Amor de Encava (2025) has been described as epic collage. The collective, based in Valencia, Venezuela, combines noise, lo-fi and vaporwave influences with cloud rap, ambient music, perreo and salsa. The album reworks Latin American popular music, including reggaeton, through sound collages that evoke travel on Latin American roads and public transport. In 2025, Crampton released Los Thuthanaka, the debut album of Los Thuthanaka, a duo formed with their twin sibling Joshua Chuquimia Crampton. It marked the highest point of visibility of the artists and the genre; Pitchfork named it the best album of 2025, The Wire placed it third on its year-end list, and Resident Advisor included it among the top electronic releases of the 21st century, placing it tenth. Paste noted that Heavensouls' album Westside Trapped exhibited "His version of the expanding Epic Collage genre is more coherent than the fever dream Los Thuthanaka but tinkers with a similar ethos".
