= Elysia Crampton Presents: Demon City =

Studio album by Elysia Crampton
- Released: July 22, 2016
- Genres: Epic collage; electronic; Andean; experimental
- Length: 25:26
- Label: Break World
- Producers: Elysia Crampton; Rabit; Why Be; Chino Amobi; Lexxi

Elysia Crampton chronology
American Drift (2015)	Elysia Crampton Presents: Demon City (2016)	Dissolution of the Sovereign: A Time Slide Into the Future (Or: A Non-Abled Offender's Exercise in Jurisprudence)

Professional ratings
Aggregate scores
Source	Rating
Metacritic	88/100
Review scores
Source	Rating
Pitchfork	8.2/10
Resident Advisor	4/5 stars
Spin	8/10
Tiny Mix Tapes	4.5/5 stars

Elysia Crampton Presents: Demon City is the second studio album by American electronic musician Elysia Crampton. It consists of a series of collaborations with fellow underground and queer electronic artists, and it has been described as an "epic poem" by Crampton. It was released on July 22, 2016, on Break World Records.

== Accolades ==
Publication	Accolade	Year	Rank
Pitchfork	The 20 Best Experimental Albums of 2016	2016	-

== Track listing ==
No.	Title	Length
1.	"Irreducible Horizon"	3:32
2.	"After Woman (For Bartolina Sisa)"	5:32
3.	"Dummy Track"	3:33
4.	"The Demon City"	3:29
5.	"Children of Hell"	2:56
6.	"Esposas 2013 (No Drums)"	2:38
7.	"Red Eyez"	3:46
