= Edits (Chuquimamani-Condori album) =

Compilation album by Chuquimamani-Condori
- Released: July 18, 2025
- Genre: Experimental
- Length: 1:39:12
- Label: Self-released

Chuquimamani-Condori chronology
| Los Thuthanaka (2025) | Edits (2025) | Ludmila Edits (2026) |

Edits is a compilation album by the American musician Chuquimamani-Condori. The album was self-released on July 18, 2025, exclusively on Bandcamp.

== Background and release ==
Chuquimamani-Condori is an American musician of Aymara descent. With a career beginning in the early 2000s, the artist has worked under several aliases, including Elysia Crampton, E+E, DJ K'oa, and DJ Ocelote. Edits is a compilation of DJ mashups and remixes produced by Chuquimamani-Condori over a six-year period, drawn from live sets, DJ mixes, and previously unreleased material. The collection consists of 24 tracks and runs for more than 100 minutes. In 2025, Chuquimamani-Condori married their partner, Travis, and released an NTS Radio mix titled Chuqi Chinchay is God (ILY Travis), which shares musical material with Edits.

== Musical style ==
Edits is an experimental compilation of DJ mashups and edits that combines Western pop and country songs with indigenous dance genres from Bolivia and Peru. Critics identified elements of Andean folk music, bro-country, tecnocumbia, cloud rap, and 1990s freestyle, with many tracks built around caporales and kullawada rhythms.

Critics noted the album's dense and fragmented sonic design. The arrangements incorporate DJ tags, sound effects, and samples from songs by Faith Hill, Bruce Hornsby, and Parker McCollum, among others. Sam Goldner from Pitchfork also observed recurring themes related to Indigenous identity, queerness, and anti-colonial perspectives, particularly through the album's juxtaposition of North American popular music and Andean rhythms.

== Critical reception ==
Professional ratings
Review scores
| Source | Rating |
|---|---|
| Pitchfork | 7.7/10 |

Sam Goldner from Pitchfork described the mashups in Edits uncover "a sense of wonder and vulnerability buried in unlikely places" and observed that the results were "not that far off from an 'official' DJ E album".

== Track listing ==
Edits track listing
| No. | Title | Length |
|---|---|---|
| 1. | "Way It Is w/ Recordar Es Volver A Vivir" | 4:36 |
| 2. | "Breathe Kullawada Caporal" | 4:09 |
| 3. | "LRC w/ Pueblo De Dios Capo" | 6:39 |
| 4. | "Alborada w/ Mari Carmen w/ Zonico" | 2:13 |
| 5. | "K'ala Marka w/ JCC" | 2:58 |
| 6. | "Eternero w/ Ecco" | 2:21 |
| 7. | "Chapman Caporal" | 4:25 |
| 8. | "Sariri Walker Demo w/ Joselito Lopez" | 7:58 |
| 9. | "Aguilas Del Amor" | 2:59 |
| 10. | "Sombra Blanca w/ When I Think Of You" | 2:57 |
| 11. | "Call Your Name w/ Shot By Dopefiend" | 4:34 |
| 12. | "Carter w/ Dejame Vivir en Paz" | 4:29 |
| 13. | "Dozen Roses w/ Zonico Kullawada Caporal" | 3:47 |
| 14. | "Red Road w/ Dolls" | 6:28 |
| 15. | "Sexteto Viento w/ Leo & JCC w/ Intocable w/ Virtuoso Capo Kullawada" | 3:49 |
| 16. | "Dream w/ Danny" | 4:19 |
| 17. | "Parker w/ JCC" | 4:29 |
| 18. | "Dylan w/ Emmsu Records w/ Lauren" | 3:40 |
| 19. | "Oner w/ Alewife" | 3:21 |
| 20. | "The River w/ Niurkas Chica Orion" | 2:43 |
| 21. | "JCC w/ Christian w/ Steve" | 2:26 |
| 22. | "Gregory w/ Jocelyn w/ Qhantati Ururi" | 5:43 |
| 23. | "Game Capo" | 2:21 |
| 24. | "Sabrina w/ Cobra w/ Che & Osteer Tribal Love" | 5:48 |
| Total length: | | 1:39:12 |
