= Heavensouls =

heavensouls

Background information
- Born: Chidi Obialo; April 10, 2006 (age 20)
- Genres: Experimental hip-hop; epic collage; nu jazz; IDM
- Years active: 2022–present
- Labels: NTS Radio; DeadAir Records
- Member of: The Sidepeices; CAPERFLOWER

Chidi Obialo (born April 10, 2006), known professionally as heavensouls (styled in lowercase), is a Nigerian-American musician and record producer based in Houston, Texas. He is a member of the group The Sidepeices [sic] with collaborator Stickerbush.

== Early life ==
Chidi Obialo was born in Nigeria on April 10, 2006. At age seven, his family moved to the United States.

== Career ==
During the 2020s, Obialo met close collaborator Stickerbush through online forums and messaging platforms. The pair formed the group the Sidepeices releasing a trilogy of albums: Lightskin Niggas with Darkskin Problems (2024), Darkskin Niggas with Lightskin Problems (2025) and Darklight (2026). The album Darklight was described by Treble as "Tim Hecker and/or Oneohtrix Point Never producing a southern rap album".

On March 7, 2026, Obialo released the album westside trapped. Paste ranked the album at number 4 on their list "The 50 best albums of 2026 so far" and noted "His version of the expanding Epic Collage genre is more coherent than the fever dream Los Thuthanaka but tinkers with a similar ethos". They later released the single "shipping times and quiet streets" described as a "a ceremonial collage tinted by fairy therapy's agile jazz saxophone." This was followed by the release of the album Cantu of the Sower which was given a 8.2 by Pitchfork and labelled Best New Music. Obialo has been described as a "RateYourMusic darling" achieving success in the "online music" scene.

== Discography ==
=== Albums ===
Title	Album details
Debut	Released: 2023; Label: Self-released; Format: Digital download, streaming
Bliss	Released: 2023; Label: Self-released; Format: Digital download, streaming
Jambalyah	Released: 2024; Label: Self-released; Format: Digital download, streaming
Central Station Bootleg 3	Released: 2024; Label: Self-released; Format: Digital download, streaming
Lightskin Niggas With Darkskin Problems	Released: 2024; Collaborators: Heavensouls & Stickerbush (The Sidepeices); Label: Self-released; Format: Digital download, streaming
Sharman Dealer	Released: 2024; Label: Self-released; Format: Digital download, streaming
Northside Trapped	Released: 2024; Label: Self-released; Format: Digital download, streaming
Fondren & 2nd Greenspoint	Released: 2025; Label: Self-released; Format: Digital download, streaming
Darkskin Niggas With Lightskin Problems	Released: 2025; Collaborators: Heavensouls & Stickerbush (The Sidepeices); Label: Self-released; Format: Digital download, streaming, CD
PRODUCT PRODUCT PRODUCT PRODUCT PRODUCT PRODUCT	Released: 2025; Label: Self-released; Format: Digital download, streaming
New York Fall, 1977	Released: 2025; Label: Self-released; Format: Digital download, streaming
Southside Trapped	Released: 2025; Label: Self-released; Format: Digital download, streaming
Darklight	Released: January 2026; Collaborators: Heavensouls & Stickerbush (The Sidepeices); Label: Self-released; Format: Digital download, streaming, CD
Westside Trapped	Released: March 2026; Label: Self-released; Format: Digital download, streaming
Cantu of the Sower	Released: October 2026; Label: Self-released; Format: Digital download, streaming

=== Mixtapes ===
Title	Mixtape details
This is Where im at Rn [sic]	Released: 2024; Label: Self-released; Format: Digital download, streaming
Album 3	Released: 2024; Label: Self-released; Format: Digital download, streaming
Mixtape 1	Released: 2024; Label: Self-released; Format: Digital download, streaming

=== EPs ===
Title	EP details
Central Station Bootleg	Released: 2022; Label: Self-released; Format: Digital download, streaming
Some Songs I Made w/ Friends	Released: 2023; Label: Self-released; Format: Digital download, streaming
Central Station Bootleg 2	Released: 2023; Label: Self-released; Format: Digital download, streaming
Prada Black	Released: 2024; Label: Self-released; Format: Digital download, streaming
Central Station Bootleg 4	Released: 2024; Label: Self-released; Format: Digital download, streaming
Afro-Surrealism	Released: 2024; Collaborators: Heavensouls & Stickerbush; Label: Self-released; Format: Digital download, streaming
Nekka, Your [sic] My Sorrow	Released: 2025; Label: Self-released; Format: Digital download, streaming
