= Post-Internet (music) =

Music inspired by the post-Internet art movement

Post-Internet music is a style of 21st century music addressing the Internet's ubiquity in society as influenced by the post-Internet art movement. The term "post-Internet art" was originally coined by artist Marisa Olson in 2006. Writer Gene McHughe would author the blog "Post-Internet" in 2009, which developed and popularized the concept. In 2010, Canadian musician Grimes began describing her work as "post-Internet". By 2015, the idea of post-Internet music was formally introduced by Irish composer Jennifer Walshe.

The term "post-Internet music" was originally used by publications to describe the work of composer Holly Herndon and London's PC Music record label and art collective founded by musician A. G. Cook. Record label, Hippos in Tanks founded by Barron Machat and Travis Woolsey in 2010, was defined as a new form of avant-garde and alternative music for "the post-internet age" by the Fader. In 2015, the London Contemporary Music Festival hosted an event entitled "Requiem for Reality", which focused on the idea of incorporating post-Internet art ideas into the context of musical composition. The event featured music by artists such as Jennifer Walshe, James Ferraro, PC Music associate Felicita, Neele Hülcker and Brigitta Muntendorf.

Additionally, the style was initially associated with academia, art galleries and art school contexts. However, has since been attributed to several Internet related musical styles and microgenres such as vaporwave, epic collage, hyperpop and internet rap.

== Etymology ==
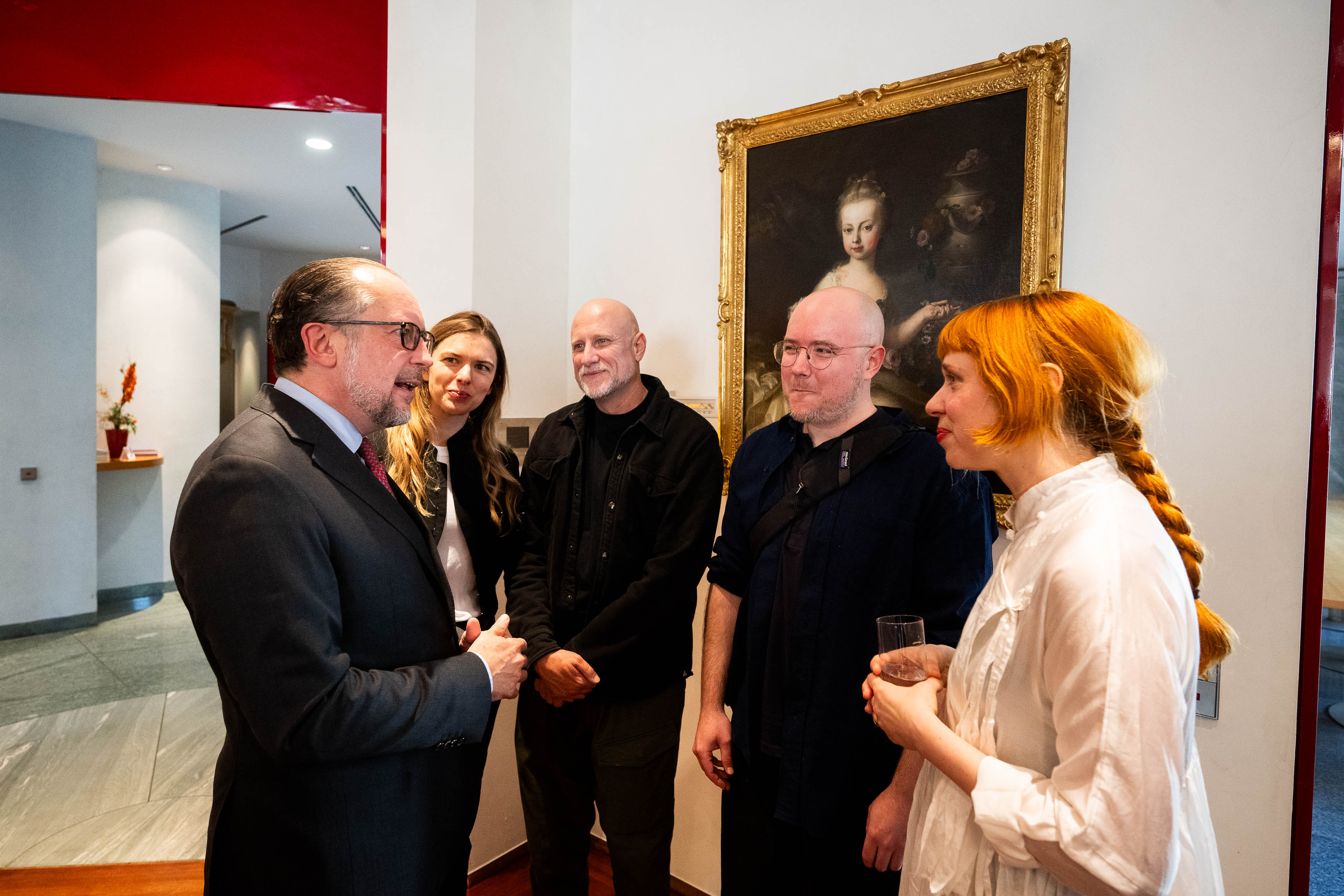
Chancellor of Austria, Alexander Schallenberg and Holly Herndon photographed in Berlin on 7 June 2024

The term "post-Internet" was originally coined by artist Marisa Olson in 2006 to describe contemporary art that focused on the Internet's ubiquity in the 21st century. However, the term went on to encompass a movement spearheaded by Gene McHughe's 2009 blog "Post-Internet". The movement's influence has extended into music as well as broader fashion trends. In 2015, writing for Vice magazine, Robert Barry aimed to define post-Internet music in an article entitled "So What Is Post-Internet Music, Anyway?". He stated that at the time the idea of "post-Internet music" was scarce and usually applied to the work of Holly Herndon and London's PC Music record label and art collective founded by musician A. G. Cook. According to Barry, Max Pearl and Michelle Lhooq, writing in THUMP, PC Music was "post-internet art" and there was a connection between their sound and the post-Internet video work of Ryan Trecartin. However, Barry ultimately credits Irish composer Jennifer Walshe with introducing the idea of "post-Internet music" on Facebook in the spring of 2015.

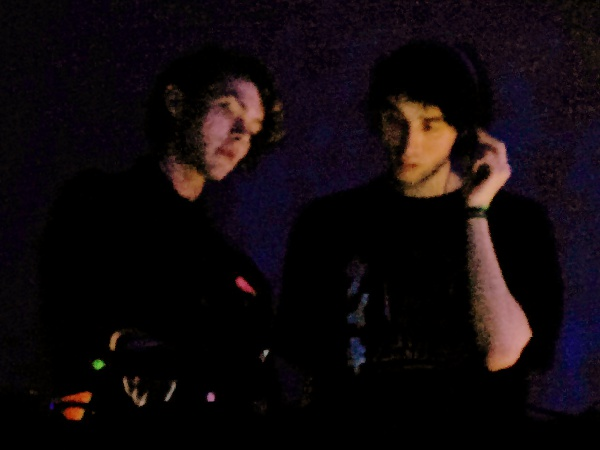
British musicians Sophie (left) and A. G. Cook (right) were members of the art collective PC Music credited with pioneering post-Internet music.

Walshe described post-Internet music as "music written after the internet is as much a part of everyday life as electricity or indoor plumbing". She added that post-Internet music incorporates and showcases elements that make the songs in question impossible to have been written at any other time in history. However, Sam Mackay, one of the curators of the London Contemporary Music Festival, argued, "It's not simply that such music couldn't have come about without the internet, but that it actually probes and reflexively approaches that situation". In 2015, the LCMF's "Requiem for Reality" event was billed as a focus on exploring how the art world's "post-internet" ideas could work in the context of musical composition. The event hosted music by Jennifer Walshe, James Ferraro, PC Music associate Felicita, Neele Hülcker and Brigitta Muntendorf. Barry cited Walshe's forty minute video and performance piece The Total Mountain as an example of post-Internet music, adding that Walshe was looking to "memes on her iPhone for inspiration". The performance piece included YouTube clips, screen captures of Wikipedia pages, text messages, a "Twitter opera", valley girl accents and the Department of homeland security's flagged words list. It was premiered at the Donaueschingen Musiktage in Germany. In 2016, High Brow Magazine wrote an article on popular music in the post-Internet era, writer Sandra Canosa described "post-Internet" as not implying being beyond the Internet but denoting that it is no longer a novelty and has become part of everyday life. She added, "As with postmodern, post-rock, etc., the 'post' not only means that it comes after, but implies an awareness of its medium, sources, audiences and its limits." Writer Peter Defraene stated for HumanHuman, "The movement then takes this self-awareness as its new subject. The result is a metastate of looking."

In 2018, music and culture critic Adam Harper wrote an article entitled "Charting the evolution of post-internet music" for Red Bull Music Academy. He stated that post-Internet music concerned art that "addressed the effects of digital technology on modern ways of seeing and living". He added that, "Just as not all books are about paper and not all radio shows are about electromagnetic radiation, the digital medium itself may be receding into the background as a style or subject matter for new electronic music".

However, the phrase "post-Internet music" has also been used as an umbrella term to describe several Internet related musical styles and microgenres stemming from 21st century online culture.

Additionally, Harper remarked that post-Internet art was usually "art that was based in relatively traditional gallery and art-school settings rather than an online culture itself, even if often drew from online culture." He cites that a quantity of "post-internet music" has been released under similar circumstances, including on outmoded media such as vinyl or cassette, with Gatekeeper's Young Chronos appearing as an exception due to the album being released on The Pirate Bay and a USB flash drive. Harper argued that "the whole notion of a musical expression that portrays a particular (past or present) cultural milieu with a degree of artistic distance – especially ironic distance – has been criticised as 'conceptual.' Conceptual music, it's argued or implied, is music about ideas or postures rather than emotions; its makers are veiled pretenders rather than authentic, expressive artists. Much of the criticism of what some would call post-internet music ('accelerationist' music is another term) has taken this angle."

== Characteristics ==
Early post-Internet music often embraced ironic, nostalgic, self-referential Internet aesthetics, defined by microgenres and subcultures such as seapunk and vaporwave, other influences included the work of Holly Herndon and the PC Music label founded by A. G. Cook, which gave way to bubblegum bass and hyperpop. These styles incorporated 1990s and early 2000s Internet nostalgia, kitsch, online memes, and consumer culture into a new context. They emerged primarily online and were more prevalent there than in traditional performance venues.

== History ==
=== Precursors ===
According to Vice magazine, the work of American composer Milton Babbitt has been described as a precursor to post-Internet music, though not labeled a "post-Internet artist", his work is thought of as fitting "the larger theme of analogue reality dissolving into digital simulation". Writer Igor Toronyi-Lalic labeled him "the first [modern] composer to really apply mathematical principles to music". He added that, "If the internet is anything, it’s about coding the real world. And Babbitt was doing that, trying to translate the real into the codified."

=== 2000s–2010s: Origins ===
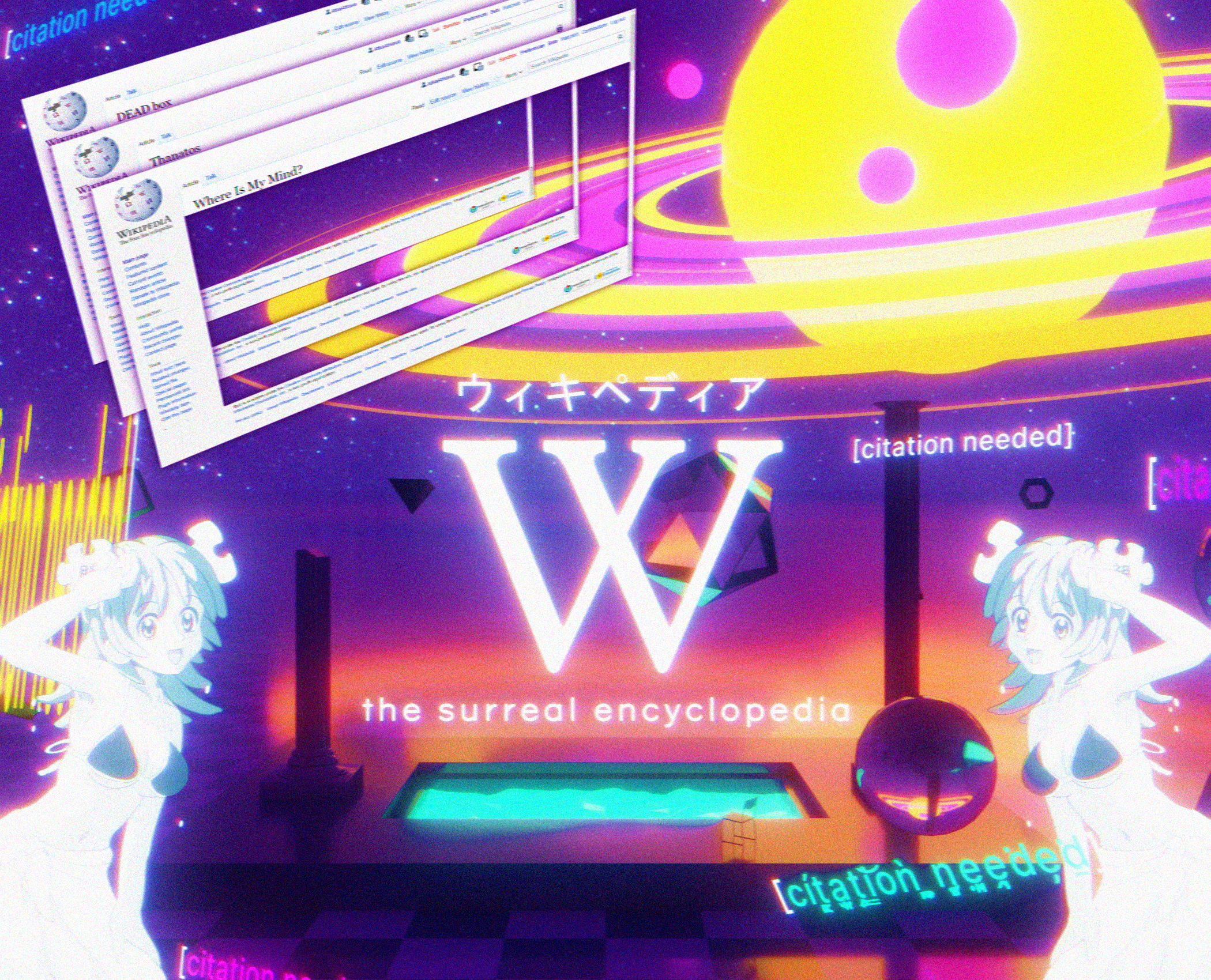
Vaporwave is among the Internet-centric microgenres that emerged in the 21st century.

Post-Internet art originated in the contemporary art world, its influence has extended into popular music, as well as broader fashion trends. This was followed by, music scenes surrounding the early online blogosphere such as bloghouse, blog rap and blog rock, and early microgenres which were distributed online such as shitgaze and hypnagogic pop which all came to define an era of alternative music that was underpinned by the growing nature of the Internet as well as MP3 blogs, netlabels, streaming services and online music journalism. By the late 2000s, chillwave became the first musical microgenre and subculture to develop primarily through the Internet. In 2010, Canadian musician Grimes began describing her work as "post-Internet", at a time when post-Internet concepts were not typically discussed in mainstream music spaces.

In 2015, the London Contemporary Music Festival's "Requiem for Reality" event was billed as a focus on exploring how the contemporary art world's "post-Internet" ideas could work in the context of musical composition. The event hosted music by Jennifer Walshe, James Ferraro, PC Music associate Felicita, Neele Hülcker and Brigitta Muntendorf. By the late 2010s, post-Internet music began to incorporate themes regarding the rise of social media and the increasing dominance of the Internet in wider society.

== In popular music ==
The independent record label, Hippos in Tanks founded by Barron Machat and Travis Woolsey in 2010, was a leading influence in post-Internet music, featuring artists like Dean Blunt, Yung Lean, Inga Copeland, Grimes, James Ferraro, Autre Ne Veut, Laurel Halo, Hype Williams, and Arca. While several musicians in genres such as electronic, hip-hop and pop music have made use of post-Internet art ideas. However, some artists have been described as creating music that reflects a post-Internet generation rather than music influenced directly by the post-Internet art movement.

=== Electronic ===
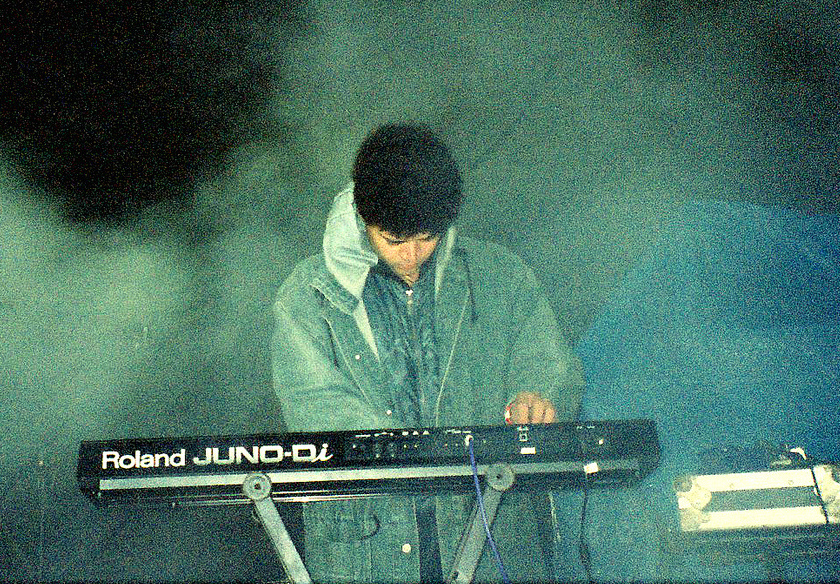
James Ferraro is an experimental artist, and has been described as "the godfather of post-internet electronic music"

The work of vaporwave pioneers Oneohtrix Point Never and James Ferraro have been linked to the pioneering of post-Internet related music. Ferraro's 2011 album Far Side Virtual alongside OPN's 2018 album Age Of have been described as reflections of the post-Internet age. Far Side Virtual was described by Dazed as full of "advertisements, ringtones, iPads, and Nintendo Wiis". Other influential artists include the works of Hayden Dunham, Laurel Halo and Holly Herndon.

Some post-Internet musicians have also collaborated with post-Internet visual artists, such as Jon Rafman's work with Oneohtrix Point Never on a two-part music video for "Sticky Drama", from Lopatin's 2015 album Garden of Delete. Ferraro had also experimented with post-Internet related visual art, releasing the film "9/11 Simulation in Roblox Environment" in 2017. His work has been compared to that of post-Internet figures such as Ryan Trecartin.

Another development associated with post-Internet music was epic collage, a subgenre of sound collage that emerged in the early 2010s. Coined by music journalist Adam Harper in 2014, experimental musician Elysia Crampton, who initially recorded as E+E, was among the pioneers associated with the genre. Drawing primarily on deconstructed club and electronic dance music, it combines the sampling of pop music and other recorded media with electronic elements, noise and sound effects.

=== Hip-hop ===
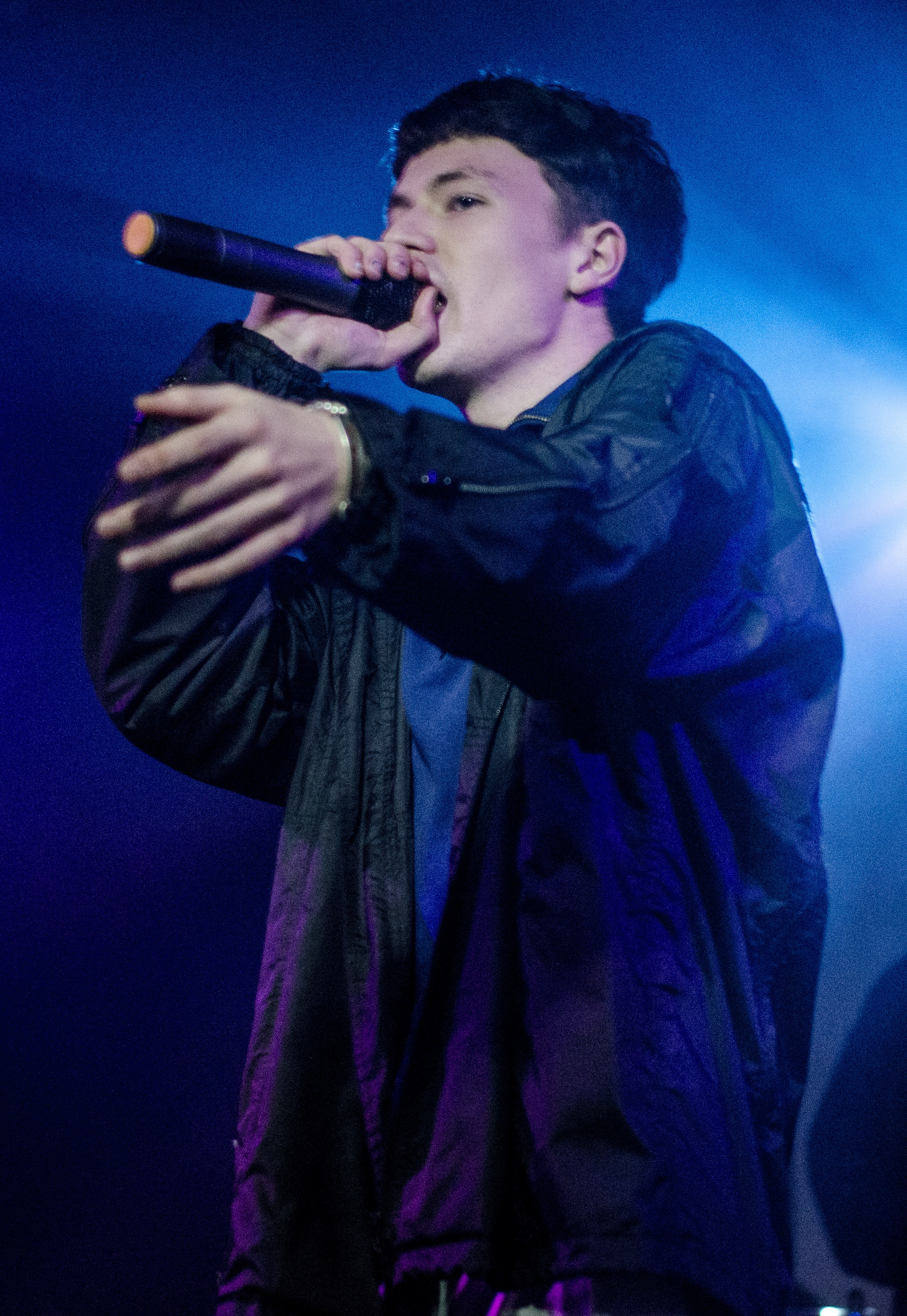
Swedish rapper Bladee, alongside his collective Drain Gang, has been described as defining "the malaise of post-internet alienation"

Soundcloud rap has been credited with emerging primarily on the Internet. Amarco referred to Swedish cloud rap artist Yung Lean, who visually drew influence from seapunk and vaporwave aesthetics, as "by and large a product of the internet and a leading example of a generation of youths who garner fame through social media." In 2015, Dazed stated that British musician M.I.A. had embraced the post-Internet aesthetic. Additionally, American rapper Sematary's sound has been described as "distinctly post-internet".

The Swedish Internet rap collective Drain Gang, consisting of Bladee, Ecco2k, Thaiboy Digital, and Whitearmor, have also been described as reflective of post-Internet music. The group inspired the microgenre draincore, later renamed to digicore. Bladee has been described as defining "the malaise of post-internet alienation". He cited the work of James Ferraro under the pseudonym BEBETUNE$ as an influence. In 2025, Bladee and Ferraro collaborated with Microsoft on an interactive visual art project incorporating generative AI.

Other rappers who have been described as post-Internet include JPEGMafia and Edward Skeletrix, the latter of whom initially gained popularity by experimenting with AI-generated videos to TikTok.

In 2024, Rolling Stone magazine described the 2020s underground rap scene as "extremely online", stating songs "have gone viral on TikTok, the app of choice for a post-internet generation". Artists cited in the article included Xaviersobased, Nettspend and Yhapojj.

=== Pop ===
PC Music, the London art collective founded by A.G. Cook in 2013 has been described as "post-Internet" by several publications. The label led to musical styles such as bubblegum bass and hyperpop, with the latter also being described as "post-Internet". Musician Cayenne of the Singoporean trio Sobs has been described by the NME as "post-Internet pop". In an article about hyperpop duo 100 Gecs, British magazine Dazed stated "Fandom in the post-internet world is an odd thing – you would think that, if you loved something so much, you wouldn't dare to tinker with it [...] when Les and Brady released their debut album, 1000 Gecs, last year, people were falling over themselves to remix it. Such are the times."

== See also ==
- New Aesthetic – Artistic movement exploring the intersection of the digital and physical worlds
- Dimes Square – New York City microneighborhood and Internet art scene
- Corecore – 2020s Internet aesthetic and artistic movement
- Information Age – Industrial shift to information technology
- Internet art – Form of art distributed on the Internet
- Net.art – Group of artists that use the Internet as their medium
- Generation Z – Cohort born from 1997 to 2012
- Millennials – Cohort born from 1981 to 1996
- Hauntology (music) – Music genre and scene based on Jacques Derrida's neologism
- Blogspot scene – 2000s music scene centered on online service Blogspot
- Internet music – Music influenced by Internet culture
- Paper Rad – American art collective
- Glitch (music) – Electronic music genre
- Tracker music – Family of file formats
- Computer music – Application of computing technology in music
- Postdigital – Artistic movement
- Digital art – Art created digitally with a computer
- Music and artificial intelligence – Usage of artificial intelligence to generate music
