= Communion (Rabit album) =

Studio album by Rabit
- Released: October 30, 2015
- Genre: Electronic
- Length: 32:11
- Label: Tri Angle

Rabit chronology
Baptizm (2015)	Communion (2015)	Excommunicate (2016)

Communion is the debut studio album by American record producer Eric Burton under the pseudonym Rabit. It was released on October 30, 2015, through Tri Angle. It received generally favorable reviews from critics.

== Background ==
Communion is Rabit's second release through Tri Angle, following the Baptizm EP (2015). He cited Tri Angle's Robin Carolan and Icelandic musician Björk as a guiding force in making the album.

== Critical reception ==
Professional ratings
Aggregate scores
Source	Rating
Metacritic	80/100
Review scores
Source	Rating
AllMusic	4/5 stars
Exclaim!	8/10
Mixmag	7/10
Pitchfork	7.9/10
Resident Advisor	4.1/5
Spectrum Culture	3.25/5
Spin	8/10
Uncut	7/10

According to the review aggregator Metacritic, Communion received "generally favorable reviews" based on a weighted average score of 80 out of 100 from 8 critic scores.

Bryon Hayes of Exclaim! stated, "Harsh and complex, the album — which was inspired by gender and sexual politics, injustice and media manipulation — is an unrelenting series of skull-pounding beat salvos, peppered with choppy vocal samples and warped synthetic textures." He added, "Burton is challenging the notion of what exactly can be classified as club music, with driving yet oblique rhythmic sequences and an unstoppable sense of exploration." Andrew Ryce of Resident Advisor commented that "Baptizm channeled Burton's ideas through the brittle steel and glass structures of modern grime, whereas Communion plays with a more wide-open field." He added, "Communion's dynamic range is impressive, not to mention unusual for an electronic music record in 2015."

Heather Phares of AllMusic stated, "While it's more challenging for instrumental music to address politics explicitly, a feeling of violation permeates the album." She added, "A haunting debut, Communion finds Rabit living up to his potential in stark, beautifully ugly and angry ways." Philip Sherburne of Pitchfork commented that "Communion plays out like a kind of fever dream, a delirium of cold sweat and disturbing visions in which there are only brief moments of daylight before you're plunged back into the maelstrom once more."

=== Accolades ===
Year-end lists for Communion
Publication	List	Rank	Ref.
Mixmag	The Top 50 Albums of 2015	15	
The Quietus	The Quietus Albums of 2015	51	
Spin	The 50 Best Albums of 2015	35	

== Track listing ==
All tracks are written by Eric C. Burton.

Communion track listing
No.	Title	Length
1.	"Advent"	2:29
2.	"Snow Leopard"	3:24
3.	"Fetal"	3:35
4.	"Artemis"	2:40
5.	"Ox"	3:05
6.	"Flesh Covers the Bone"	2:17
7.	"Pandemic"	3:24
8.	"Burnerz"	3:19
9.	"Glass Harp Interlude"	1:50
10.	"Black Gates"	3:16
11.	"Trapped in This Body"	2:52
Total length:		32:11

== Personnel ==
Credits adapted from liner notes.

- Eric C. Burton – music
- Heba Kadry – mastering
