= American Drift =

Studio album by Elysia Crampton
- Released: August 7, 2015
- Recorded: 2012–2014
- Genres: Electronic; Andean music; avant-garde; progressive; psychedelic; epic collage
- Length: 30:38
- Label: Blueberry
- Producer: Elysia Crampton

Elysia Crampton chronology
American Drift (2015)	Elysia Crampton Presents: Demon City (2016)

American Drift is the first studio album by American electronic musician and composer Elysia Crampton, after their previous work under the name E+E. It was released on August 7, 2015, on Blueberry Records and was released to high critical acclaim from various critics.

== Background ==
Crampton began composing American Drift in 2012 while living in Roanoke and Richmond, Virginia, and was further producing the album in La Paz, Bolivia in 2014. The album was created as part of a project to describe the experience of prehistoric and precolonial history in direct relation to African-American history and Aymara history, as well as Christian faith and ontology. Crampton was inspired by Southern hip hop and crunk, Bolivian and Peruvian prog, metal and psych, trival/tribal-guarachero, black spirituals and early blues, psychedelic folk, and neo-classical music, as well as their brother's avant-garde records, and their grandfather's collection of huayno and cumbia tapes. She also cited late writer José Esteban Muñoz's writings on brownness, which she correlated with the Earth and its geology.

In press photos for American Drift, Crampton was often depicted in forest settings, as well as holding a copy of Stacy Alaimo's Bodily Natures: Science, Environment, and the Material Self.

== Concept ==
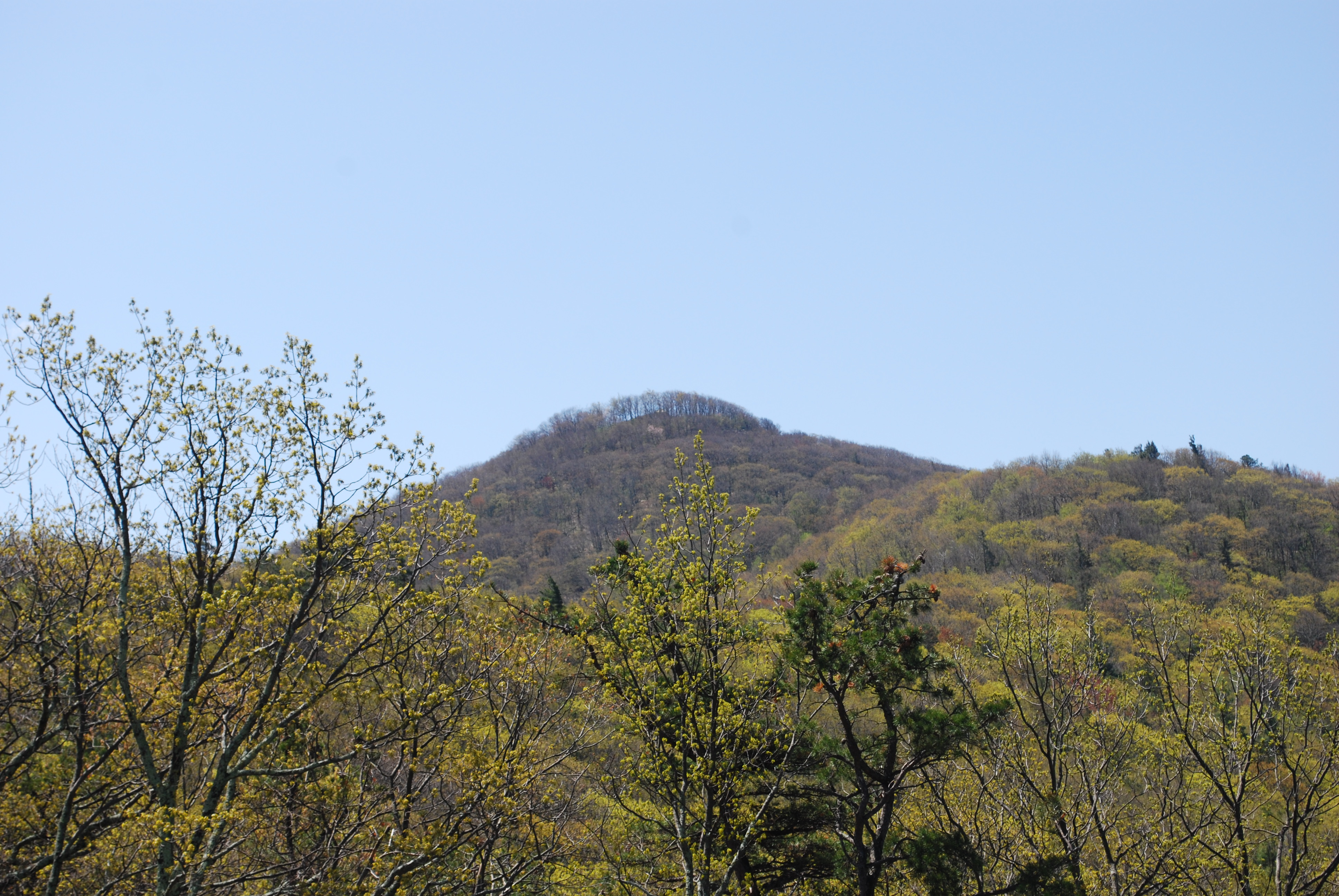
The Shenandoah Mountain in Virginia served as a geographical and geological inspiration for American Drift.

Crampton described both themselves and American Drift as taking a transevangelistic approach. The title track, written for and spoken by their collaborator Money Allah (who also appears on "Wing"), is set as a transevangelistic prayer. Lyrically, it references Paul Claudel's poetic cycle "The Way of the Cross" and the Christian hymn "Rock of Ages", and depicts the "wildly disanthropocentric" transformation of natural settings. "Petrichrist" is a portmanteau of petrichor and Christ, and musically documents Crampton's drive in a Ford Ranger up Shenandoah Mountain in Virginia. It is intended as a depiction of "an encounter between mountain and vehicle, interactions of non-human objects touching one another in a worlding where all things have agency". It is dedicated to writer Jeffrey J. Cohen and crunk artist Nicole Walker. "Wing" is a piece in two parts based on particular natural cycles in prehistory; it portrays an impact event, leading into "negative photosynthesis" and finally fern spikes; the track is also dedicated to black pianist Margaret Bonds, whose piano pieces were formulative on the album among Crampton's influences. "Axacan" is named for and musically depicts the Ajacán Mission, where the first Spanish settlement in Virginia occurred violently.

== Composition ==
Alongside the influences laid out in the press release of the album, American Drift uses a distinct keyboard-based rich musical palette, including ambient pads, woodwinds and horns, and Hollywood-style stock sound effects including vocal bites, explosions, alerts, gunshots, beeps and evil laughs. These sounds are often arranged atmospherically or rhythmically in juxtaposition with the otherwise polyphonic and minimalist structure of the music, and in particular, Crampton's style of sound collages with such samples was dubbed "epic collage" by music journalist Adam Harper. Crampton's collaborator, Money Allah, who intones a poem by Crampton on the title track and raps on "Wing", is described as a "thug dove".

On "Petrichrist" and "Wing", rhythm samples reminiscent of Baile funk are used alongside cumbia patterns, and on "Axacan", cumbia sonidera samples are interspersed with rhythms recalling Andean khantus music. The album is punctuated with vocal samples and synths that refer back to Southern rap and crunk, including "yup!"s and, on "Axacan", vocal bites of rapper Lil Jon saying "yeahhh!", "what!" and "okayyy!". In correlation, the second section of "Wing" is described as a "crunk-huayno ballad". Guitars, flutes and horns that appear to be played on Kurzweil and Yamaha keyboards appear throughout, as well as similarly electronic-sounding bells, chimes and ambient pads that, according to Nick James Scavo of Tiny Mix Tapes, set an Appalachian scene.

Philip Sherburne, writing for Pitchfork, described American Drift as artistically evoking "a hillside that's been worn away by erosion to reveal a sedimentary record of the millennia". He also commented on the album's use of "woodblock rhythms", "trap chants" and "coruscating organs", praising them, as elements of the record, as being 'overwhelming in the best way.' Nick James Scavo, writing for Tiny Mix Tapes, commented that "the beauty of Crampton's art is that it gorgeously describes a drifting, transitional nature — to pin it down is to forget its essence, to rob it of movement." Scavo also stated that the album artistically "evoke[s] the biologically self-queering nature of the "sublime" [and] approaches the "opening" of Crampton’s sound as a trans-ontology".

== Track listing ==
Professional ratings
Review scores
Source	Rating
Pitchfork	8.1/10
Tiny Mix Tapes	4.5/5 marks

No.	Title	Length
1.	"American Drift" (featuring Money Allah)	4:10
2.	"Petrichrist"	6:19
3.	"Wing" (featuring Money Allah)	10:20
4.	"Axacan"	9:39
