= Chino Amobi =

American artist, musician and director

- Also known as: Diamond Black Hearted Boy
- Born: Chinonyeelu Uchechi Amobi; 1984 (age 41–42); Tuscaloosa, Alabama, U.S.
- Occupations: Contemporary artist, musician, painter, label founder, director
- Years active: 2010–present
- Labels: NON Worldwide, The Vinyl Factory

Chinonyeelu Uchechi Amobi (born 1984), also known as Chino Amobi, is an American contemporary artist, musician, painter and director. He is a co-founder of the now-defunct independent record label NON Worldwide, and has released albums on the label that include Airport Music for Black Folk (2016) and Paradiso (2017).

== Early life and education ==
Amobi was born in Tuscaloosa, Alabama, in 1984 and grew up in Virginia. Amobi's parents emigrated from Nigeria, and he frequently traveled to the country as a child to visit extended family. Concerned about assimilation into American life, Amobi's parents did not teach their children to speak their native Igbo. Amobi experienced alienation growing up in America and said "I can't speak Igbo so I never fully felt Nigerian or black American." However, Amobi has also spoken of the importance and closeness of the Nigerian-American community in Virginia to his family. He has also recalled his travels to Nigeria as a significant early artistic influence.

As a child, Amobi pursued art and learned to make music through software like eJay, the first-generation PlayStation game MTV Music Generator, and Apple Inc.'s GarageBand. In high school, Amobi made hip-hop music with his brother, who is now a rapper under the name Chichi the Eternal. He favored music with an immersive, world-building quality, naming video game music and musicians like Nas, Wu-Tang Clan, Björk, and Radiohead as early influences. Amobi attended the public John Tyler Community College with a plan to transfer to undergraduate art school, obtain a doctorate, and teach painting at the community-college level. He transferred to Virginia Commonwealth University in 2006, graduating cum laude in 2009 with a BFA. In 2019, Amobi completed a MFA in graphic design at VCU.

== Career ==
=== Diamond Black Hearted Boy (2009–2014) ===
While at art school, Amobi began releasing music under the alias Diamond Black Hearted Boy. His early music was self-released through Myspace. Amobi was quoted in a 2012 New York Times article on seapunk, an early-2010s subculture and microgenre that prized aquatic aesthetics:

As with any online trend, seapunk is probably fleeting. Chino Amobi, an artist from Richmond, Va., who makes electronic music under the name Diamond Black Hearted Boy, has already shifted from seapunk to slimepunk. (Note: Amobi shared more thoughts and visual art about slimepunk in an interview with Charlotte McManus, who also interviewed Le1f and several others.) "It's the toxic waste of 2012," he said. On March 9, Mr. Amobi will hold a slimepunk rave in Brooklyn during the Arts Not Fair. "It's going to be the saddest rave you've ever been to."

As Diamond Black Hearted Boy, Amobi became part of an underground scene of musicians using electronic production techniques to create a subgenre of sound collage dubbed "epic collage". "Nigerian Hair," a Diamond Black Hearted Boy track, appeared on Blasting Voices, a 2012 various-artists compilation featuring E+E (an alias of Elysia Crampton), James Ferraro, and Ryan Trecartin.

In 2013, Diamond Black Hearted Boy released Father, Protect Me., a full-length cassette compiling several of the project's tracks. Praising the tape for its narrative cohesion, Adam Harper wrote that Amobi's voice is "on the outer reaches of hip hop culture and its means of self-expression. If Kanye is a 'God,' DBHB is a fallen god languishing in some weird purgatory, and his collected work is a Yeezus for even greater degrees of alienation." Harper compared the tape's music to a subverted form of cloud rap, and remarked that it "mixes together the sweetness and violence of the modern soundscape (music and non-music) in ways that play on the mind and are often frankly distressing." How The West Was Won, Wanted: Dead or Alive, Amobi's final long work as Diamond Black Hearted Boy, came out in 2014. Harper said this final release "flicks through the wreckage of the twentieth-century Americana like it was TV channels on a concave wood-paneled screen, jerry-building a mock-epic (anti-)hero's tale along the way."

=== NON Worldwide and Airport Music For Black Folk (2015–2016) ===
By 2015, Amobi stopped using the Diamond Black Hearted Boy moniker for his new music, instead releasing work under his own name. Amobi told OkayAfrica he realized he had used the name as a "mask," and "I didn't want to hide behind a mask and that I wanted to claim ownership of what I was making, to be able to face someone as me without an alter ego. In the same way that Wangechi Mutu or Richard Serra or Philip Glass create, I want my work to be an extension of me." An early Amobi project under his own name was a noise-inspired remix of Michael Jackson's "They Don't Care About Us". He released a collaborative mixtape with Houston-based producer Rabit, The Great Game: Freedom From Mental Poisoning (The Purification of The Furies).

That same year, Amobi—along with the musicians Nkisi, from London, and ANGEL-HO, from Cape Town—co-founded NON Records (also called NON Worldwide). NON is an independent record label dedicated to artists who are African or of the African diaspora, with an artistic and political vision articulated in a manifesto written by Amobi, "NON SUPPORTS ITS CITIZENS OF THE UNITED RESISTANCE".

In 2016, Amobi released the EP Airport Music For Black Folk. The title alludes to Brian Eno's landmark 1978 ambient album Ambient 1: Music for Airports. According to Matthew Trammell at The New Yorker, Amobi's EP offered "a more explicit take on air travel" than Eno's Music for Airports, with "buzzy synths swell into prominence like a takeoff, asymmetrical percussion mimics the metallic dance of landing gear unfolding, and talk-box samples evoke the chorus of voices, automated and analog, that echo through terminal halls." Joe Muggs of The Wire called the EP "a sonic illustration of the tensions felt by non-white travellers in today's surveillance society." Later that year, NON held a performance at the New Museum during Red Bull Music Academy Festival New York. Amobi contributed to two of his friends' albums in 2016: Elysia Crampton Presents: Demon City by Elysia Crampton and $uccessor, the debut album of the Sacramento, California-based producer Fred Warmsley (aka Dedekind Cut).

=== Paradiso (2017–present) ===
Amobi made his solo vinyl debut with Minor Matter, a soundtrack accompaniment to choreographer Ligia Lewis's piece of the same name. He also announced his debut album, Paradiso, described as "a musical epic set in a distorted Americana populated by a cast of sirens, demons, angels, imps, priests, hierophants, monsters and peasants."

The Wire praised it as "an extraordinary record: utterly grandiose, pulsing and punishing." Comparing the album's soundscape to the works of Hieronymus Bosch and Dante Alighieri, Power wrote "[m]odernity is Hell, Paradiso tells us, but the only way to understand this is to embrace it fully, to stare into the void, to get on all the fairground rides, even though you already feel sick and all the colours are wrong." The Wire named Paradiso the release of the year in its annual critics' poll. Rolling Stone named the album the year's third-best avant-garde release.

Music by Amobi was featured in "Gidi gidi bụ ugwu eze (Unity is strength)", a short film directed by Akinola Davies Jr. for fashion house Kenzo. In 2018, Amobi released a short film accompaniment to Paradiso titled WELCOME TO PARADISO: CITY IN THE SEA. Directed by Rick Farin and rendered in Unreal Engine 4, Amobi listed the film's influences as "The Global South, Hieronymus Bosch's Garden of Earthly Delights, Timothy Morton's theories regarding hyper-objects and dark ecology after the end of the world, my experiences traveling and touring globally, Square Enix, Xanadu (Citizen Kane), and the poetry of Elysia Crampton." In 2020, Amobi published a dystopian science fiction novel titled Eroica. The artist's 2024 Von Ammon Co. exhibition "Miasma" included paintings related to the novel. The paintings were generated through artificial intelligence and rendered an outsourced supplier, a process that is intended to reflect the “hyper-networked society" depicted in Eroica.

== Selected discography ==
=== Studio albums ===
- Paradiso (2017)
- Eroica (2024)
- Eroica II: Christian Nihilism (2025)

=== Soundtrack albums ===
- Minor Matter (2017)

=== Live albums ===
- Live Rehearsal (with Johnny Utterback; 2017)

=== Mixtapes ===
- The Great Game: Freedom from Mental Poisoning (The Purification of the Furies) (with Rabit; 2015)

=== EPs ===
- Anya's Garden (2015)
- Airport Music for Black Folk (2016)
- What a Wonderful World (2020)
- Darling Street (2021)
- French Extremism (2023)
- Airport Music for Black Folk: K-Pop (2025)

=== As Diamond Black Hearted Boy ===
- e (2011)
- Father, Protect Me. (2013)
- z^{ero} (2013)
- How The West Was Won, Wanted: Dead or Alive (2014)
