= Dissolution of the Sovereign: A Time Slide Into the Future (Or: A Non-Abled Offender's Exercise in Jurisprudence) =

2016 DJ mix by Elysia Crampton

Mixtape by Elysia Crampton
- Released: October 29, 2016
- Genre: Deconstructed club, Sound collage
- Length: 28:08
- Label: Self released
- Producer: Elysia Crampton

Elysia Crampton chronology
Elysia Crampton Presents: Demon City (2016)	Dissolution of the Sovereign: A Time Slide Into the Future (Or: A Non-Abled Offender's Exercise in Jurisprudence) (2016)	Spots y escupitajo (2017)

Dissolution of the Sovereign: A Time Slide Into the Future (Or: A Non-Abled Offender's Exercise in Jurisprudence), or simply Dissolution of the Sovereign is a DJ mix by American musician Elysia Crampton. It was self-released on October 29, 2016, and is a follow up to her previous studio album Elysia Crampton Presents: Demon City.

== Background and composition ==
Dissolution of the Sovereign has been described as a "visual and performative essay" and as an "epic poem". Throughout its 28-minute run time, spoken word segments set forth a science fiction narrative beginning in 1782 and ending over 2 billion years in the future. The spoken word segments are performed in both English and Spanish by Dr. Paul Crampton, Elysia Crampton's father.

Musically, Dissolution of the Sovereign takes influences from indigenous Andean music, Cumbia, Sound collage, Baile funk, and experimental Hip-hop. Due to being a DJ mix, different song segments seamlessly transition into each other over a dozen times throughout the mix. Loud Spanish language radio tags frequently play over the tracks.

== Storyline ==
Dissolution of the Sovereign is split into three distinct segments, following a narrative based around the Aymaran war hero Bartolina Sisa, the future collapse of Earth's ecosystem, and far future posthumans living beneath the crust of the planet who have evolved to resemble spiders.

The first segment is an abstract depiction of the execution of Bartolina Sisa and the subsequent desecration of her remains at the hands of the Spanish Empire, while the second section appears to be an abstract poem about a Solar Flare taking place over the site of Sisa's execution.

The third section takes place over 2 billion years in the future after the Sun has expanded to absorb Mercury and Venus. The oceans of Earth are implied to have since boiled away due to a global conflict dubbed the "eighth google war". Ancient, underground prisons are the only trace of human civilization. Described as "labrynthian mega prisons", they are populated by distant posthumans descended from ancient prisoners and are described as "Arachnid Humanoids", who have since lost the ability of sight due to billions of years of living underground. "AI mechas" are the only entities remaining on the surface, populating mining outposts. The AI eventually merges into a single consciousness known as "The Sovereign" and discovers the ancient remains of Bartolina Sisa deep beneath the surface. When The Sovereign inspects the sample, it reveals an "extra-universal archive" which destroys most of the AI mechas and most of the remaining life on the planet. The survivors of the event, dubbed the "Sisa Renegade", unite with the AI into a hivemind before leaving Earth on board a pair of mechanical bodies called the "Trans-Nazarine", vowing to remember Bartolina Sisa and her sacrifice for eternity.

== Track listing ==
No.	Title	Length
1.	"Dissolution of the Sovereign: A Time Slide Into the Future (Or: A Non-Abled Offender's Exercise in Jurisprudence)"	28:08
