= Bartolina Sisa =

Bolivian revolutionary

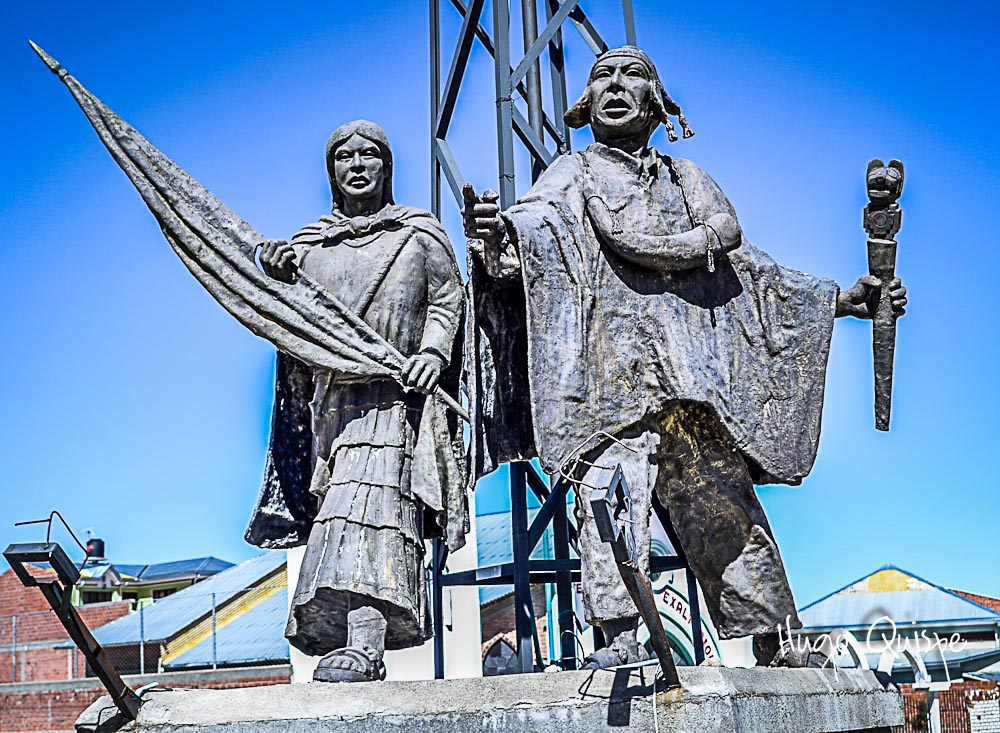
- Statue of Bartolina Sisa alongside Túpac Katari
- Born: c. 1750; Q'ara Qhatu, Viceroyalty of La Plata, Spanish Empire
- Died: 5 September 1781 (aged 31); La Paz, Viceroyalty of Peru, Spanish Empire (now in Bolivia)
- Known for: Indigenous leader, freedom fighter

Bartolina Sisa Vargas (c. 1750 – 5 September 1782) was an Aymaran woman and indigenous heroine who led numerous revolts against the Spanish rule in Charcas, then part of the Viceroyalty of Peru and present-day Bolivia. Alongside her husband, the indigenous leader Túpac Katari, she participated in the organisation of indigenous military camps that took part in the siege of La Paz. She was betrayed and turned in to the Spanish authorities, who later executed her.

Honouring the date of her death, the International Day of Indigenous Women is celebrated every 5 September since 1983 in Bolivia. Bartolina Sisa is often the name used by many indigenous organisations in Bolivia, such as the Bartolina Sisa Confederation, the primary union of peasant women in the country.

== Biography ==
Bartolina Sisa was born around the year 1750 in the indigenous community of Q'ara Qhatu (Caracoto in Spanish), a village in the Real Audiencia of Charcas, Viceroyalty of La Plata, the daughter of José Sisa and Josefa Vargas. She was still a young child when her family moved to Sica Sica, where they traded coca leaves and worked in the production of woven goods. As it was common for peasant families of the region, she traveled across the Altiplano selling the goods produced by her family. Also in Sica Sica lived Julián Apaza, later to be known as Túpac Katari, whom Sisa married and with whom she had four children. According to the Franciscan friar Matías Balderrama, Sisa was thin, of medium height, comely appearance and great intelligence.

During her early adulthood Sisa witnessed the violence and injustice that the indigenous peoples of the Altiplano were often victims of at hands of the Spanish rule, which later motivated her to join her husband leading indigenous militias across the Altiplano to resist the colonial rule.

In 1780 an indigenous insurrection of mostly Aymara and Quechua peoples took place against the colonial rulers of the Viceroyalty of Peru, led by Túpac Amaru II. During the uprising, Bartolina Sisa was given an important leadership role at the head of an army of around 40,000

=== Siege of La Paz ===
Bartolina Sisa, her husband and other indigenous leaders like José Gabriel Condorcanqui. Jose was later known as Túpac Amaru II, and the brothers Damasio and Tomás Katari were joined together in their ideals of indigenous empowerment and managed to gather around 150,000 indigenous, mostly Quechuas and Aymaras, to join their cause.

On 13 March 1781 Sisa and Túpac Katari establish a siege around the city of La Paz, then capital of Charcas and seat of the colonial Real Audiencia with a force of some 20,000 men, later to be joined by other 80,000. The city is located on an enclosed valley with limited access, and the siege was able to completely block all movement to and from the city. During this time, Sisa organised military camps around all the mountain passes that led to the city and acted as main command of the indigenous forces. On 21 May, a Spanish military force attempted to dissolve the siege and capture Sisa, failing to do so.

Katari and Sisa set up court in El Alto and their army maintained the siege for 184 days, from March to June and from August to October. Sisa was a commander of the siege, and played the crucial role following Katari's capture in April. After almost 190 days of siege, it was finally broken by a Spanish reinforcement force arriving from Lima, La Plata and Buenos Aires. The Spanish forces received help from other indigenous communities that were opposed to Katari and that ultimately led to his capture: they were executed by hanging in September, 1782.

Bartolina Sisa was captured and executed by the Spanish on September 5, 1782. She was hanged after being publicly humiliated in the La Paz's Main Square (now Plaza Murillo), beaten and raped. Once dead, the Spanish cut her body into pieces, showed her head in public to intimidate the natives, and sent her limbs to be exhibited in different villages.

== Legacy ==
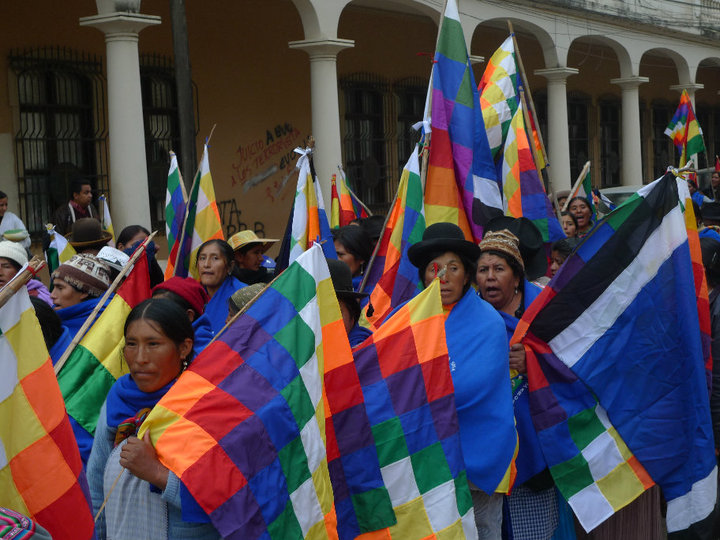
Bartolina Sisa Confederation

In 1980 it was named in her honour the Bartolina Sisa Confederation, a union organisation for indigenous and peasant women, with the aim of improving the participation of indigenous and rural women in the political, social and economic decisions of Bolivia. Also, in 1983 the Second Meeting of Organisations and Movements of the Americas, meeting in Tiwanaku, decided to celebrate the International Day of the Indigenous Woman every 5 September, the same day of her execution.

The 2016 album Dissolution of the Sovereign: A Time Slide Into the Future (Or: A Non-Abled Offender's Exercise in Jurisprudence) by Bolivian-American musician Elysia Crampton is a fictionalized retelling of the life story of Bartolina Sisa. It is a Sci-Fi narrative extending into the far future depicting Sisa's mummified remains fusing with the distant ancestors of humanity in a "liberation".

== Bibliography ==
- Valencia Vega, Alipio (1978). Bartolina Sisa — la virreina Aymara que murió por la libertad de los indios (in Spanish). La Paz: Librería Editorial "Juventud".
- del Valle de Siles, María Eugenia (1981). Bartolina Sisa y Gregoria Apaza — dos heroínas indígenas (in Spanish). La Paz: Biblioteca Popular Boliviana de "Ultima Hora".
- Ari, Marina (2003). Bartolina Sisa — La generala aymara y la equidad de género (in Spanish). La Paz: Editorial Amuyañataki.
- Thomson, Sinclair (2002). We alone will rule: Native Andean politics in the age of insurgency. Madison: University of Wisconsin Press. ISBN 978-0-299-17790-4.

== See also ==
- India Juliana
- Micaela Bastidas
- Dissolution of the Sovereign: A Time Slide Into the Future (Or: A Non-Abled Offender's Exercise in Jurisprudence)
