= IVVVO =

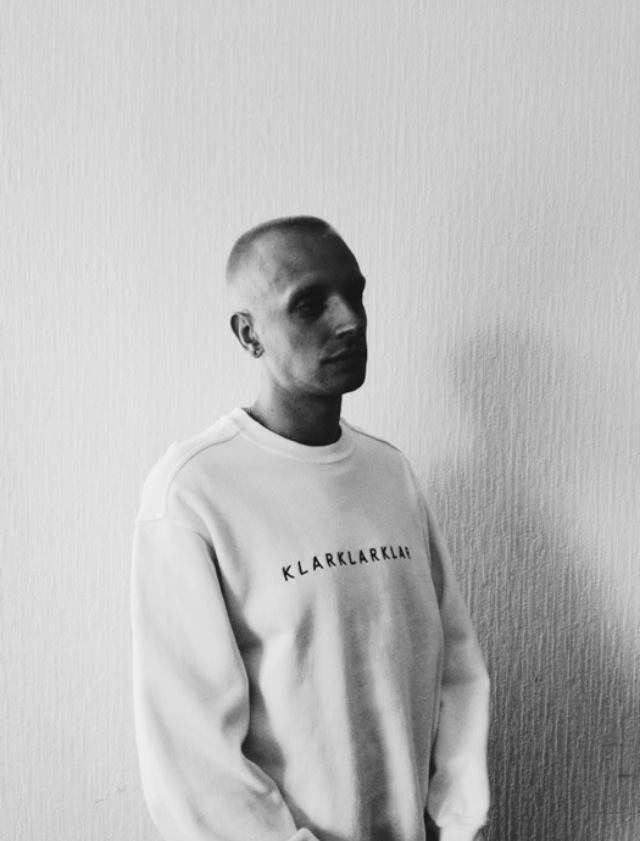

Background information
- Also known as: IVVVO
- Born: Ivo Pacheco; 1989 (age 36–37); Oporto, Portugal
- Genres: Electronic, techno, experimental
- Occupations: Artist, curator, creative director
- Years active: 2012-present
- Labels: Terrain Ahead; Opal Tapes; Public Information; Halcyon Veil; Danse Noire; AD 93

Ivo Pacheco, professionally known as IVVVO, is a Portuguese musician, artist and curator. In 2023, he introduced a new project called SOFT COMMODITY, which serves as a research and curatorial art platform.

His practice is primarily occupied with concepts of millennial anxiety, social angst, vulnerability, and the global crisis's agony, analysing its constituents’ parts for reuse in a different context. He shifts the condition of constant deconstruction and reconfiguration and the idea of a non-hierarchical, boundaryless universe, maintaining a taste for intensity and emotions as a tool for immersive engagement in addressing the repressed underpinnings of contemporary culture.

== Terrain Ahead ==
Founded by the hands of Ivo Pacheco (IVVVO), Luis Dourado (Purple) and Tiago Carneiro (Solution) in late 2010, Terrain Ahead was the cradle of a new generation of electronic musicians that emerged in Oporto.

=== Albums ===
- Occult (moun10, 2012)
- All Shades Of White (Opal Tapes, 2012)
- Prince of Grunge (Nyx Unchained, 2017)
- doG (Halcyon Veil, 2019)
- Bleached Butterfly (AD 93, 2022)

=== EPs and singles ===
- Here EP (Terrain Ahead, 2011)
- I Just Love You EP (Terrain Ahead, 2011)
- Future EP (Public Information, 2013)
- Light Moving EP (Fourth Wave, 2013)
- Theories of Anxiety EP (Danse Noire, 2014)
- Mark Leckey Made Me Hardcore EP (Crème Organization, 2015)
- Good, Bad, Baby, Horny EP (Halcyon Veil, 2017)

=== Other albums ===
- Dead Cities Vol.1 (One Eyed Jacks, 2012)
