= Ange Madame =

South African musician

Angel-Ho
- Origin: Cape Town, South Africa
- Genres: Pop; Electronic; Experimental; Industrial; Disco
- Occupations: Musician; Producer; Performance Artist
- Formerly of: NON Worldwide

Angelo Antonio Valerio, (Note: She is to be referred to as Angel or Angie.) better known as Ange Madame, formerly Angel-Ho (oftentimes stylized in all-uppercase) is a South African producer, rapper, vocalist and performance artist. Best known for her song Like A Girl, her musical style has been described as experimental, (post-)industrial, pop and neo-pop. She is also a co-founder of the now-defunct collective and independent record label NON Worldwide.

== Career ==
Angel was born and raised in Cape Town, South Africa. She studied fine arts at the University of Cape Town.

In 2015 she started releasing music on a joint SoundCloud account with fellow musicians Chino Amobi and Nkisi, both of which she met online. That account turned into their own independent record label, NON Records (also known as NON Worldwide). In an interview with Amobi it has been described as "a worldwide resistance movement." The first music uploaded by NON Worldwide was the 27 minute long mix Death Drop From Heaven by Angel.

Angel put out her debut EP Ascension later that same year. It released via Rabit's Halcyon Veil label and was mastered by Arca. She also featured on a song by South African rapper and producer Dope Saint Jude called "Keep In Touch". In 2016 she also joined the Cape Town Electronic Music Festival lineup.

After catching the attention of M.I.A. and opening for her in South Africa, Angel's debut album, Death Becomes Her was released via Hyperdub in 2019. The album saw her rapping and singing over decidedly more pop productions, referencing a myriad of other songs, such as Lumidee's Never Leave You, as to "collectively encompass a broader experience shared by queer people of color around the world." The album deals with Angel's transition, especially on songs such as Like a Girl.

In late 2019, Angel-Ho's song Chaos was featured on Adult Swim's HyperSwim compilation alongside contributions from Burial, Orion Sun, Laurel Halo, Dean Blunt and many more. By 2019 NON Records became defunct.

Angel's EP Alla Prima released in September 2020 and was described by her as "Hip Hop Haute Couture".

The short documentary Angel-Ho: The Documentary was directed by South African filmmaker Allison Swank and released at the end of September 2021. It roughly follows the Dancing On Air music video shoot and deals with Angel's schizophrenia and how it impacted her art and identity. It is entirely narrated by the artist alongside brief interview portions with her mother.

In 2023 Angel won the Standard Bank Young Artist Award for Performance Art at the National Arts Festival.

As of June 2024, accompanied by the release of her new album, Birth Becomes Her, Angel changed her alias from Angel-Ho to Ange Madame. Later that same year she released her second self-titled album, Ange Madame, alongside a mixtape of club tracks created for live performances.

== Personal life ==
In 2015 Angel was a part of the Rhodes Must Fall movement.

Angel is queer and non-binary.

== Discography ==
=== Studio albums ===
- 2019 – Death Becomes Her
- 2020 – Woman Call
- 2021 – A Time to Die
- 2023 – Angel-Ho
- 2024 – STAIN
- 2024 – Birth Becomes Her
- 2024 – Ange Madame

=== EPs ===
- 2015 – ASCENSION
- 2020 – Alla Prima
- 2024 – Moonlight
- 2024 – MUSICAL PROSTITUTE
- 2024 – Big Bang

=== Mixtapes ===
- 2024 – Atonal Rebel Blues Mixtape

=== Live Albums ===
- 2023 – Angel-Ho (The LIVE Album)

=== Singles ===
- 2018 – "Doll"
- 2018 – "Like A Girl" (featuring K Rizz)
- 2020 – "Juice"
- 2020 – "Diva"
- 2022 – "GLOW"
- 2023 – "Starlight"
- 2023 – "Got2Move"
- 2024 – "Rain"
- 2024 – "The Give"
- 2024 – "Dreckitude"
- 2024 – "Aint Shit 2 Me"
- 2024 – "Psycho Disco"
- 2024 – "Drunk On Your Love"
- 2024 – "Ms. A"
- 2024 – "Freedom"
