= DJ E =

2023 album by Chuquimamani-Condori

Studio album by Chuquimamani-Condori
- Released: November 15, 2023
- Genre: Experimental
- Length: 29:05
- Label: Self-released

Chuquimamani-Condori chronology
Quirquincho Medicine (2019)	DJ E (2023)	Los Thuthanaka (2025)

DJ E is the second studio album by the American musician Chuquimamani-Condori. The album was self-released on November 15, 2023, exclusively on Bandcamp. Musically, critics have categorized the instrumental album as experimental record that incorporates elements of Andean folk genres and electronic music. Conceived as a densely layered sound collage, DJ E combines traditional instrumentation and rhythms with digital sound effects, distorted production, and experimental compositional techniques. Themes throughout the album draw on Aymara cultural concepts and Latin American queer theory.

DJ E received positive reviews from music critics; released without label support or external promotion, the album reached listeners primarily through word of mouth within experimental music communities. Reviewers described the album as both challenging and danceable, and praised its ambitious fusion of styles and dense arrangements. The album appeared on year-end and retrospective lists, including Pitchfork's list of "The 100 Best Albums of the 2020s So Far" (2024), where it was ranked ninth, and Paste's list of "The 250 Greatest Albums of the 21st Century So Far" (2025).

== Background and release ==
Chuquimamani-Condori is an American musician and poet of Aymara descent. With a career beginning in the early 2000s, the artist has worked under several aliases, including Elysia Crampton, E+E, DJ K'oa, and DJ Ocelote. Quirquincho Medicine (2019) is the first album issued under the Chuquimamani-Condori alias; this alias is the artist's Aymara name. The album, which combines traditional Andean rhythms with sparse acoustic instrumentation, was ranked eighth on PopMatters' list of the ten best ambient albums of 2019.

DJ E draws on ancestral Aymara concepts and Latin American queer theory. The artist described the record as "the sound of our water ceremonies" and compared it to 40 bands playing melodies simultaneously to recreate the "cacophony of the first aurora and the call of the morning star Venus". Chuquimamani-Condori's brother, Joshua Chuquimia Crampton, contributed guitar work to the album, while PK Crampton contributed the sound of a circular saw. DJ E was self-released exclusively on Bandcamp on November 15, 2023. Without label support or external promotion, it reached listeners primarily through word of mouth within experimental music communities.

== Musical style ==
DJ E has been categorized by music critics as an experimental record that combines Andean folk traditions with electronic music styles. The album consists of seven tracks in a running time of over 29 minutes. Journalists have also identified elements of cumbia, huayno, tarqueada, psychedelic music, and chopped and screwed, assembled through a collage approach. DJ E was issued in an unmastered state; the artist stated that they were unwilling to quiet any aspect of the work or create an "illusion of cohesion" through the process. The album's production includes hyper-compressed digital bass, white-noise blasts, and digital stock sound effects such as skidding tires and drawn swords. This aesthetic reflects a rejection of "clean" sound design, in which Chuquimamani-Condori has characterized its polished, futuristic sound design as rooted in colonialist modes of education. Instrumentation includes siku panpipes, flutes, synthesizers, electric guitar, grand pianos, and DJ tags, alongside a circular saw.

"Breathing", the opening track, features a slowed and pitch-shifted sample of "Un Vaso de Cerveza" by Argentine cumbia singer Mario Pereyra. The track layers the vocal sample with multiple melodic lines. It is followed by "Eat My Cum", which explores atonal harmonies and dissonant tonal structures. It includes a sample of manic laughter previously used in Chuquimamani-Condori's earlier work as E+E, alongside science fiction-inspired electronic effects and guitar performed by Crampton. "Engine" combines grand piano melodies with industrial sounds, including a circular saw and high-pitched mechanical effects. "Forastero Edit" incorporates stock sound effects resembling the drawing of swords alongside intermittent guitar passages performed by Crampton. The track "Return" features siku panpipes layered beneath distorted bass and heavily processed production. Pitchfork's Sam Goldner compared its dense and obscured soundscape to the disorienting qualities of experimental forms of Brazilian funk, particularly those characterized by heavily clipped bass presets and hypnotic rhythmic textures. "Know" is structured around slowed and pitch-shifted vocal samples. The closing track, "Until I Find You Again", features a folk fiddle melody alongside heavy percussion. In contrast to the album's more dissonant material, the track employs prominent major-key harmonies and a comparatively melodic structure.

== Critical reception ==
Professional ratings
Review scores
Source	Rating
Pitchfork	8.0/10

Sam Goldner from Pitchfork described DJ E as a "binary-smashing collage with ecstatic overtones", characterizing the music as "simultaneously harrowing yet warm, deathly urgent yet defiantly playful". He also praised the album's unmastered sound, noting that its dense and "claustrophobic" production heightened the music's intensity. The same publication in its list of "The 100 Best Albums of the 2020s So Far" (2024) ranked DJ E ninth. Writing for the publication, Alphonse Pierre described the album as a "beguiling collage" characterized by dense layers of sound and abrupt stylistic shifts. In Paste's list of "The 250 Greatest Albums of the 21st Century So Far" (2025), Devon Chodzin said that the album evoked strong feelings of nostalgia while avoiding what he viewed as nostalgic idealization. He praised DJ E's emotional impact and vitality, highlighting tracks such as "Breathing" and "Until I Find You Again" for their energy and expressive qualities.

Writing for Resident Advisor, Max Pearl described DJ E as "gloriously chaotic and triumphant", comparing it thematically to the MoMA PS1 mural the artist created with their brother. He observed that the album distinguishes itself from Chuquimamani-Condori's earlier work through a greater mastery of layering and an embrace of uplift as a compositional principle, citing online listeners' descriptions of the music as "light-giving", "life-affirming", and "cathartic". Raphael Helfand of The Fader praised the album's experimental approach, describing it as a result of a "massive, multi-genre pileup". Helfand also remarked on the tension between the record's abrasive, collage-like arrangements and its underlying danceability, arguing that its rhythmic foundation allowed its unconventional combinations of sounds to remain accessible despite their complexity. Dazed's Martyn Pepperell noted the album's densely layered arrangements and symbolic content, writing that its compositions build "layers of sound and symbolism" that swell and recede over the course of the record.

== Track listing ==
DJ E track listing
No.	Title	Length
1.	"Breathing"	4:17
2.	"Eat My Cum"	3:16
3.	"Engine"	3:39
4.	"Forastero Edit"	2:19
5.	"Return"	4:54
6.	"Know"	6:10
7.	"Until I Find You Again"	4:30
Total length:		29:05

== Personnel ==
Credits are adapted from Bandcamp.

- Chuquimamani-Condori (Elly) – teclas, CDJ, BOSS samplers, baby grand piano
- Joshua Chuquimia Crampton – guitar (tracks 2, 4), bass (track 3), artwork, cover art
- PK Crampton – circular saw
