= Los Thuthanaka =

Studio album by Los Thuthanaka
- Released: March 22, 2025
- Genres: Andean music; experimental; epic collage; psychedelia; trance; drone
- Length: 60:42
- Label: Self-released

Los Thuthanaka chronology
Los Thuthanaka (2025)	Wak'a (2026)

Chuquimamani-Condori chronology
DJ E (2023)	Los Thuthanaka (2025)	Edits (2025)

Joshua Chuquimia Crampton chronology
Estrella Por Estrella (2024)	Los Thuthanaka (2025)	Anata (2026)

Los Thuthanaka is the debut studio album by the American duo Los Thuthanaka, consisting of siblings Chuquimamani-Condori and Joshua Chuquimia Crampton. The album was self-released on March 22, 2025, as a surprise release, exclusively on Bandcamp and YouTube. It was developed through the duo's engagement with Aymara musical traditions and the reflection of the principle of ayni (reciprocity between humans and nature).

Musically, critics have categorized the instrumental album as experimental, epic collage, trance, and drone music, while also identifying elements of cumbia, psychedelic rock, noise rock, plunderphonics and sound collage. Los Thuthanaka combines traditional Andean musical genres such as huayno, caporal and kullawada with experimental electronic production. Its production incorporates unmastered audio, clipping, static, and layered instrumentation including electric guitars, synthesizers, keytar, ronroco, and bombo italaque drums.

Los Thuthanaka received widespread critical acclaim upon release. Pitchfork awarded the album a score of 9.3/10 and named it the best album of 2025. The album was also ranked among the year's best releases by several publications, including number two on Paste and number three on The Wire, as well as number ten on Resident Advisor's list of the best electronic records released between 2000 and 2025.

== Background and production ==
Chuquimamani-Condori and Joshua Chuquimia Crampton are American siblings with Aymara heritage. Prior to Los Thuthanaka, both siblings had released solo work independently. Chuquimamani-Condori's recordings as a DJ and producer drew on experimental electronic music and sound collages; their 2023 album DJ E was self-released without external promotion and spread largely through word of mouth, receiving an 8.0 rating from Pitchfork and was covered by publications including The Fader and Resident Advisor. Crampton had released guitar-based works incorporating traditional Andean music, noise, and psychedelia, including Estrella por Estrella (2024).

The Los Thuthanaka project draws on the siblings' long-term engagement with Aymara cultural practices, including rhythms learned from family members and participation in ceremonial contexts. The term thuthanaka derives from the Aymara language, in which thutha means "moth" and -naka is the plural suffix, literally meaning "moths". The album is dedicated to Chuqi Chinchay, a figure in Aymara belief associated with dual or non-binary identities. The artists have referred to the concept of ayni, denoting reciprocal relationships within communities and across generations, and to Aymara conceptions of time in which past and future are understood as interconnected. The music on the album originated from material that was written and performed live, a factor that Joshua Chuquimia Crampton noted provided the songs with "raw energy". Los Thuthanaka's production is deliberately unmastered, with audio clipping and static employed as aesthetic choices. Instrumentation spans both contemporary and traditional tools, including electric guitars, a keytar rig, the ronroco, the electronic keyboard, bombo italaque drums and a CDJ.

The album was surprise released on March 22, 2025, exclusively on Bandcamp and YouTube. A compact disc (CD) edition was also issued. It was the first musical record credited to the siblings Chuquimamani-Condori and Crampton as a duo. The album cover image on the album's Bandcamp page incorporates Aymara and Andean iconography, including a mask resembling those worn during Bolivian festivals, particularly Carnival, and images of pumas, alongside a clock and a moth. Confetti and streamers evoke festive settings, while loudspeakers, saturated colors and artificial lighting suggest a contemporary nightclub. The juxtaposition of these elements has been interpreted by scholars Nuno Manna and Igor Lage as a connection of Andean cultural imagery with electronic music and modern dance culture. They further interpret the clock as introducing a tension between modern, standardized conceptions of time and the repetition, excess, and instability associated with the album's music.

== Musical style ==
=== Overview ===
Los Thuthanaka has been categorized by music critics as an experimental, epic collage, trance and drone recording. The album reimagines various traditional genres of Andean music from the duo's Aymara heritage, such as huayno, caporal and kullawada, in experimental electronic forms; several tracks include parenthetical genre labels in their titles, identifying the traditional Andean musical form each is based on. Diego Rubio of Rockdelux says the duo incorporates them into a fragmented continuum of electronic and Afro-diasporic dance rhythms associated with Latin club music. The album consists of eight instrumental tracks, most exceeding eight minutes in length, structured to function similarly to a continuous DJ mix through repetitive, propulsive arrangements. Journalists have also identified elements of Andean folk, cumbia psychedelic rock, chopped and screwed, sound collage, lo-fi, noise rock, plunderphonics, braindance, and the "hyper prog" reminiscent of bands such as 100 gecs according to Jesse Dorris of Resident Advisor. Crampton's electric guitar forms the basis of the arrangement, while Chuquimamani-Condori incorporates sampled, pitch-shifted vocal interjections such as "Yo!" and "Grrrrr!" over syncopated rhythms.

=== Songs ===
"Huayño 'Ipi Saxra'"
Two excerpts from "Huayño 'Ipi Saxra'". The opening section incorporates rhythmic vocal interjections and repeating patterns, while the second excerpt highlights dense noise textures and intensified percussion.

"Q'iwanakax-Q'iwsanakax Utjxiwa", the opening track, begins with a rapid sequence of electronic sounds before transitioning into an ambient, electroacoustic passage. Rubio describes the use of digital noise, a prominent sub-bass and electric guitar, with the arrangement subsequently moving towards a more psychedelic sound. The track also features guitar lines, synthesizers, and processed dialog interspersed with electronic stutter. Its title translates from Aymara as "The Queer People-Medicines Are Here". "Jallalla Ayllu Pahaza Marka Qalaqutu Pakaxa" is driven by percussion and incorporates martial-style drums. The production is notably lo-fi, with Pitchfork critic Joshua Minsoo Kim comparing the sound as though it is playing through small speakers or from another room. Rubio describes the track as juxtaposing the rhythms of qala qala, associated with Andean markas, with global dance styles including gqom and funk bruxaria.

"Huayño 'Ipi Saxra'" is built around a syncopated electric guitar riff layered over a traditional Andean huayno rhythm, a festive Andean dance style characterized by syncopated rhythmic patterns played on guitar. It is accompanied by backspins, synthesizer stabs, and sampled sound effects. The arrangement incorporates short, percussive vocal grunts and repetitive rhythmic figures. It features a gradual, episodic structure centered on the interaction between Crampton's electric guitar and Chuquimamani-Condori's dual-keytar setup, while synthesizers, electronic sounds and percussion accumulate around it. In its final two minutes, the track shifts toward layered noise textures and more percussion. "Huayño 'Phuju'" is structured around syncopated guitar rhythms, bitcrushed synthesizer sounds, and repeated DJ tags. "Caporal 'Apnaqkaya Titi'" is structured as a caporal, a high-energy Bolivian dance form characterized by a double-kick drum pattern, with the addition of jagged guitar chords that give the track a dance-punk quality. Kitty Empire from The Observer described the track as incorporating elements of "video game math rock".

"Kullawada 'Awila'" is a near twelve-minute track and takes the form of a kullawada, another Bolivian dance style. The track is structured around a marching band rhythm that gradually fragments into dense cymbal work and distorted guitar and is built on a persistent interplay between guitars, drums and recurring piano chords. Guitars and percussion contribute to its sustained, dance-oriented intensity. The piano gradually recedes into the broader arrangement as the percussion intensifies, with audible audio clipping in the later stages of the track. The piece concludes with guitar work rather than a conventional climactic resolution. "Parrandita 'Sariri Tunupa'" is a drone track that combines ambient textures reminiscent of Oneohtrix Point Never with an underlying celebratory rhythm. The track features panpipe textures alongside subwoofer-heavy bass. "Salay 'Titi Ch'iri Siqititi'" closes the album with an arrangement combining orchestral stabs, dog barks, DJ scratches, and heavily processed organ sounds, anchored by Crampton's guitar work. The track ends with a low vocal laugh and a crackling percussive sound.

== Critical reception ==
Professional ratings
Review scores
Source	Rating
Pitchfork	9.3/10

Los Thuthanaka was met with universal acclaim from music critics. In a 9.3/10 review for Pitchfork, Joshua Minsoo Kim described the album as "ceremonial but swaggy, cataclysmic but healing, unrefined but magnificent". He called it a "dense, elaborate thicket of sound" where "traditional genres and ancestral wisdom coexist with digital ephemera and rapturous noise", remarking that its unmastered nature serves as "a call to unlearn contemporary notions of sonic perfection and surrender to music in all its forms". It was the highest rating Pitchfork awarded to any new album since Fiona Apple's 2020 album Fetch the Bolt Cutters. The album topped Pitchfork's list of the top 50 albums of 2025. Jeremy D. Larson, in his accompanying writeup, wrote that "Los Thuthanaka is an album about transience and permanence, the mutability of sound and its deep roots". He characterized the work as one that asks for "time, patience, reorganization, reframing, and reconnection".

In a review for Resident Advisor, Jesse Dorris described the album as "an excellent surprise drop" and "mind-blowing", praising its fusion of styles into "something new". He wrote that the duo "queer everything they touch" with "a determined flamboyance", while emphasizing that he did not "hear a second of irony" in the record's presentation. The Quietus reviewer Eden Tizard wrote that the album's music leaves listeners with "a sense of slack jawed euphoria" and praised its immersive atmosphere. Diego Rubio from the Spanish-language music magazine Rockdelux praised the album very positively, highlighting the album's ability to connect physical, dance-oriented music with spiritual experience, arguing that its rhythms induce a trance that blurs "the divine, the unattainable, and the mundane". He described the resulting sound from the album's combination of Bolivian and Peruvian folkloric traditions as "strangely familiar while completely new at the same time".

Writing for Stereogum, Chris DeVille called Los Thuthanaka "an easy shortlist contender for 2025's best album", describing it as "eight propulsive instrumentals that get the most out of repetition but never feel like they're spinning their wheels". The Observer's Kitty Empire listed the album among the "hidden gem albums of 2025", describing it as "gloriously borderless", characterizing the record as "at once ancient and modern" and noted that, despite the duo's prior individual releases, the album "feels newly exhilarating".

=== Rankings ===
Publication	List	Rank	Ref.
Crack	The Top 50 Albums of 2025	9	
Paste	The 50 best albums of 2025	2	
Pitchfork	The 50 Best Albums of 2025	1	
The Quietus	The Quietus Albums of the Year 2025	59	
Resident Advisor	The Best Releases of 2025	—N/a	
Resident Advisor	The Best Electronic Records of 2000-25	10	
Stereogum	The 50 Best Albums Of 2025	14	
Vogue México y Latinoamérica	The 30 Best Latin Music Albums of 2025	1	
The Wire	Top 50 Releases of the Year	3	

== Track listing ==
No.	Title	Length
1.	"Q'iwanakax-Q'iwsanakax Utjxiwa" ("The Queer-People Medicines Are Here")	6:28
2.	"Jallalla Ayllu Pahaza Marka Qalaqutu Pakaxa" ("Victory Ayllu Pahaza Marka Calacoto Pacajes")	5:30
3.	"Huayño 'Ipi Saxra'" ("Dumb Evil")	8:56
4.	"Huayño 'Phuju'" ("Spring Fount")	8:06
5.	"Caporal 'Apnaqkaya Titi'" ("Driveable Cat")	3:04
6.	"Kullawada 'Awila'" ("Queer Grandma")	11:32
7.	"Parrandita 'Sariri Tunupa'" ("Tunupa the Walker")	8:57
8.	"Salay 'Titi Ch'iri Siqititi'" ("Cat Warlock Ant")	8:09
Total length:		60:42

== Personnel ==
Adapted from Bandcamp.

- Chuquimamani-Condori (Elly) – teclas, sampler, CDJ, ronroco, bombo italaque
- Joshua Chuquimia Crampton (Josh) – guitar, bass, artwork, cover art
