= Chuquimamani-Condori =

American electronic music artist

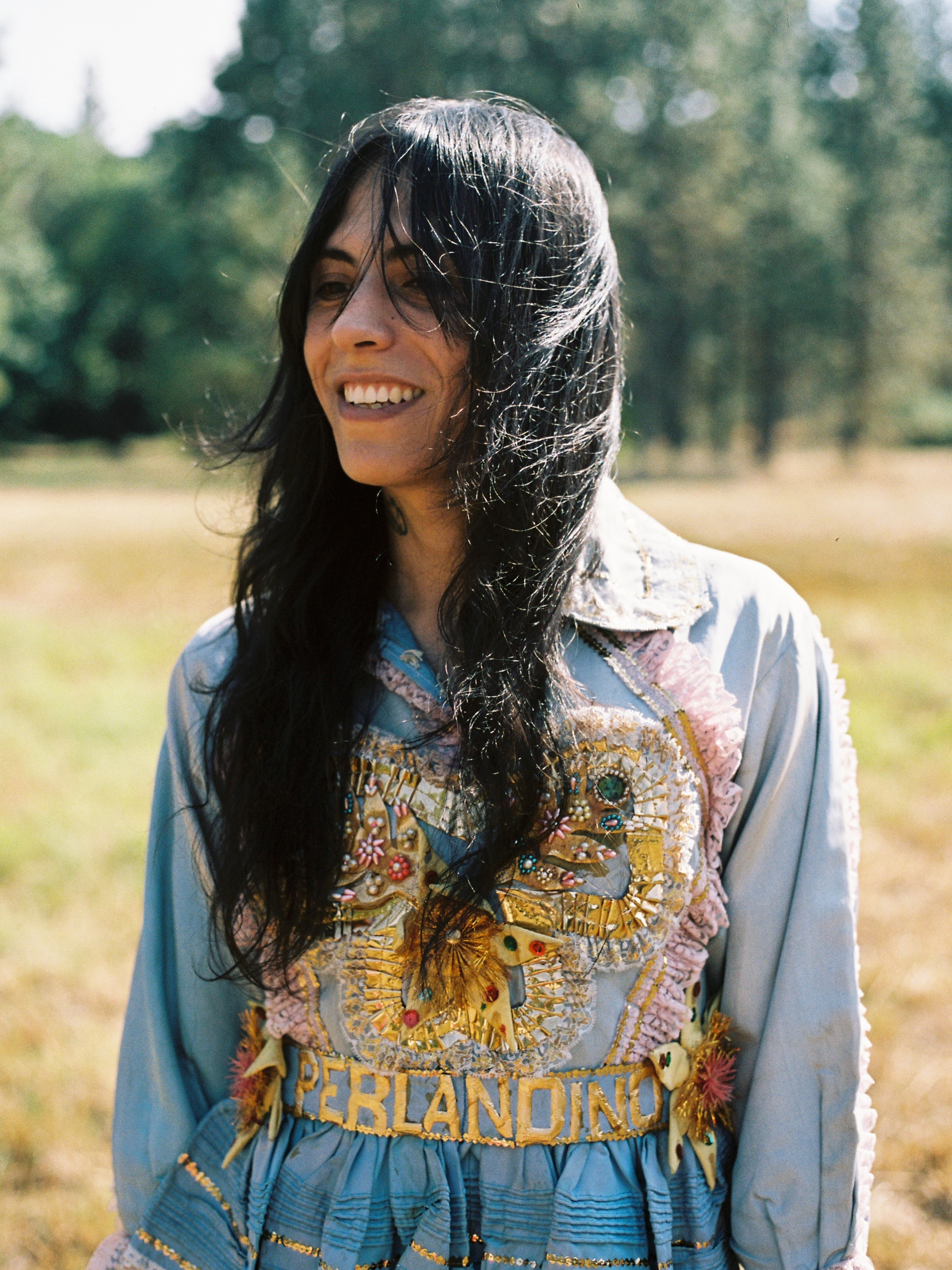
- Chuquimamani-Condori photographed by boychild in 2018.

Background information
- Also known as: Elysia Crampton, Elysia Crampton Chuquimia, E+E, DJ Ocelote
- Born: 1985 (age 40–41); Riverside, California, U.S.
- Genres: Andean; electronic; rock; avant-garde; psychedelia; epic collage
- Occupations: Artist, poet, composer
- Years active: 2008–present
- Labels: PAN, Blueberry Recordings, Break World Records
- Member of: Los Thuthanaka

Elly Crampton Chuquimia Quiñones-Tancara, Aymara name Chuquimamani-Condori, is an American electronic music artist, poet and composer. Their music has been described in music criticism as being based around Andean music and cumbia, incorporating contemporary composition and North American genres like country, forms of rock, trap, and R&B. Conceptually, they have based their music and artworks on Aymara belief and Latin American queer theory. They are one half of the duo Los Thuthanaka, along with their brother Joshua Chuquimia Crampton. The two siblings identify with the Pakajaqi nation of Aymara people.

In 2025, they were awarded the Venice Biennale Silver Lion award following the release of Los Thuthanaka's self-titled album that spring. The album was named by Pitchfork as the best album of 2025.

== Career ==
Crampton began making music under the name E+E, a way of writing "And & And" in Spanish, doubling as a pun on their name and member Erik Ansaya's, in the 2000s. Their music as E+E consisted of edits, remixes, and DJ mixes made with a keyboard, acapellas, and a sampler.

In 2015, they concluded the E+E project and released their first studio album, American Drift, under the name Elysia Crampton. The album took three years to make and was made as an encapsulation of research and personal interests developed while pursuing residence in Virginia in the aforementioned years. The album was released on August 7, 2015, and was met with critical success. Philip Sherburne said for Pitchfork, in praise, that it:

[...] is only four songs long, but it represents a monumental undertaking. [They have] described it as an exploration of Virginia's history as well as a meditation on brownness, on being Latina, and as a kind of geology. [Their] epiphanies feel hard-won, and they shine all the more brightly for it.

Crampton released their second album, Elysia Crampton Presents: Demon City, on July 22, 2016. It featured mutual collaborators including Chino Amobi, Rabit, Why Be, and Felix Lee. Music review website Tiny Mix Tapes gave the album a 4.5 out of 5, while Pitchfork said: "Demon City, Virginia producer Elysia Crampton's follow-up to [their] sumptuous debut American Drift, is a wonder of concision and represents another massive leap forward in [their] growth," of the album.

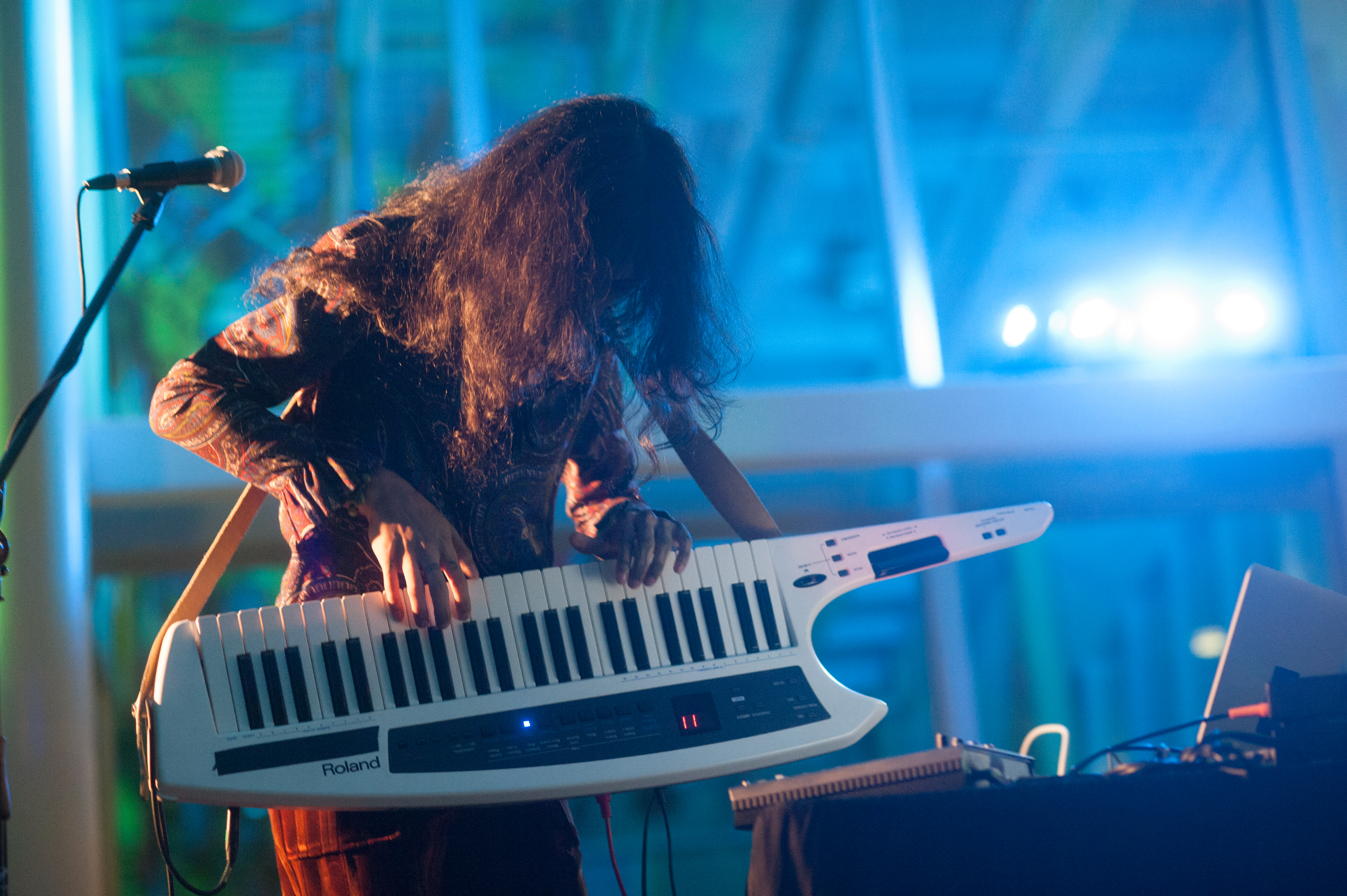
Elysia Crampton in concert at OBEY Convention X (2017)

In 2023, they released the album DJ E, their first album to be released under their Aymara name, Chuquimamani-Condori. The album received critical acclaim, landing at the #9 spot on Pitchfork's 2024 list entitled "The 100 Best Albums of the 2020s So Far". In 2025, Chuquimamani-Condori and their brother Joshua Chuquimia Crampton released a self-titled album under the name Los Thuthanaka (English: The Moths). The album received universal acclaim, and it was named as the best album of 2025 by Pitchfork.

In 2026, Chuquimamani-Condori created the music for the Museum of Modern Art’s exhibition Na Mira NO SMOKING, a work commissioned by the museum.

== Musical style ==
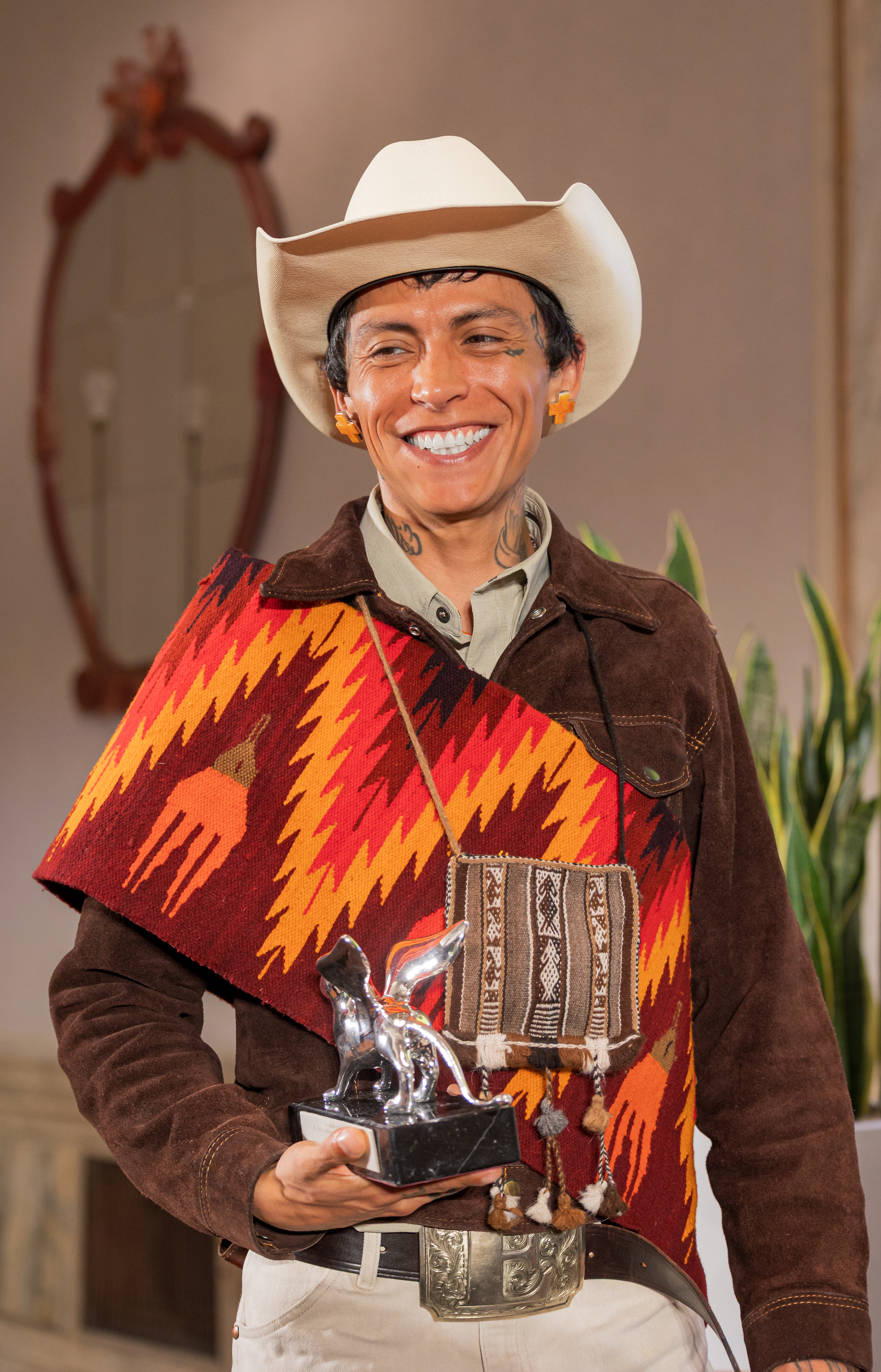
Chuquimamani-Condori at the Silver Lion Award Ceremony — Venice Biennale (2025)

Chuquimamani-Condori's music is notable for drawing from an eclectic and wide variety of influences, including cumbia, and Andean music like huayno and tarqueada, as well as North American genres like country, crunk, metal, R&B and minimalism. However, their eclecticism is owed to their understanding and incorporation of Aymara ontology in their music, specifically the concepts of taypi and ch'ixi. As a way of summing up their stylistic intent, they have used the tags prog and folk to describe their music.

During the time of the making of their album American Drift, they were living in rural Virginia and being inspired by the expansive local geographical features around the area, described as "wild Southern surroundings", in the area, one of which was the Shenandoah Mountain. They previously made journeys around it, with one inspiring track two of American Drift, 'Petrichrist'. In an interview to promote the album, they remarked that "the older I get, the uglier I want my music to feel, to be".

Through music, the post-colonial divide between Peru and Bolivia was bridged for me, and I was allowed to glimpse an ancient, illusive moment of my heritage that barred nationalistic dividings. The mixture of electronic and acoustic sounds, especially in huayno, provided inspiration that has stuck to this day. The incorporation of these textures into my own voice never had to be deliberately sought out; these ancestral/familial narratives, languages, tones, colors... moved with me as I musically came of age.

They also cited many individuals as influences for their 2015 album American Drift, including José Esteban Muñoz (a noted Cuban-American queer theorist), black pianist Margaret Bonds, Jeffrey Jerome Cohen (a writer and professor in Medieval studies) and queer performance artist, photographer and close friend boychild. They have said that their 2016 album, Elysia Crampton Presents: Demon City, was written in the style of a musical epic poem. They said that the album was inspired by Aymaran revolutionary Bartolina Sisa, who is often remembered in indigenous history. The album was a companion piece to their theatrical production and DJ set Dissolution of the Sovereign: A Time Slide Into the Future (Or: A Non-Abled Offender's Exercise in Jurisprudence).

== Personal life ==
Crampton was born and grew up in the desert areas on the periphery of Barstow, California. They were nomadic, moving between the United States, Mexico and Bolivia for most of their life, occasionally taking residence in community centers. They took piano and keyboard lessons as a child, and began writing and recording music in 2007, forming the band E&E with Erik Ansaya and Ashland Mines. After finishing up their studio album American Drift (2015) in 2014, they went to Bolivia to care for their grandmother Flora.

Chuquimamani-Condori and their brother Joshua identify with the Pakajaqi nation of Aymara people, which descends from the pre-Hispanic Pacajes lordship, located in the modern-day Pacajes Province of Bolivia. They are the great-great-grandchildren of Francisco Tancara and Rosa Quiñones, spiritual leaders from the town of Rosario, Pacajes, who were leaders in indigenous resistance to state authorities in the early 20th century.

== Discography ==
=== With E&E ===
==== Studio albums ====
- E&E (2008, self-released)

=== As E+E ===
==== Studio albums ====
- The Light That You Gave Me to See You (2013, self-released; rereleased by Total Stasis in 2016)

==== Extended plays ====
- Bound Adam (2011, self-released)
- Smile (2012, self-released)

==== Compilations ====
- Edited/Remixed [2008–2012] (2014, self-released)

=== As Elysia Crampton ===
==== Studio albums ====
- American Drift (2015, Blueberry Recordings)
- Elysia Crampton Presents: Demon City (2016, Break World Records)
- Spots y Escupitajo (2017, The Vinyl Factory)
- Elysia Crampton (2018, Break World Records)
- Orcorara 2010 (2020, PAN)

==== Singles ====
- "Moth/Lake" (2015, Boomkat Editions)
- "Flora's Theme" (2016, Williams Street Records)
- "Final Exam" with Kelela and Adrian Piper (2016, The Vinyl Factory)
- "Solilunita" (2018, Break World Records)

==== Compilations ====
- Selected Demos & DJ Edits [2007–2019] (2020, self-released)

==== DJ mixes ====
- Dissolution of the Sovereign: A Time Slide Into the Future (Or: A Non-Abled Offender's Exercise in Jurisprudence) (2016)

=== As Chuquimamani-Condori ===
==== Studio albums ====
- Quirquincho Medicine (2019, self-released)
- DJ E (2023, self-released)

==== Compilations ====
- Edits (2025, self-released)

==== Extended plays ====
- Uta Pachanqiri (2019, self-released)
- 3 Demos (2020, self-released)
- Luzmila edits (2026, self-released)

=== With Los Thuthanaka ===
==== Studio albums ====
- Los Thuthanaka (2025, self-released)

==== Extended plays ====
- Wak'a (2026, self-released)
