= Rabit (musician) =

American producer of electronic music

- Born: Eric C. Burton; Houston, Texas, U.S.
- Genres: Deconstructed club; industrial; chopped and screwed; grime
- Instruments: Synthesizer; computer; sampler
- Years active: 2010–present
- Labels: Halcyon Veil; Glacial Sound; Tri Angle

Eric C. Burton, best known by the recording alias Rabit, is an American producer of experimental electronic music, as well as the owner of his own label Halcyon Veil, born in Houston.

== Career ==
Burton began his musical career making experimental grime music for online record labels. Eventually, he released his debut album Communion on Tri Angle, which received critical acclaim; in a Pitchfork review by Philip Sherburne, where he rated the record 7.9 out of 10, he described it as "violent music" with an "unrelenting barrage of beats and palette of sampled shrapnel".

In 2017, Burton was featured as a producer on Björk's Grammy-nominated album Utopia for the track "Losss". In the same year, he released Les fleurs du mal, a shift in style to experimental electronic music outside of grime. He currently owns and releases music on the record label Halcyon Veil, which has existed since 2015.

Burton has also produced and independently released mixtapes of chopped and screwed remixes and mashups.

== Discography ==
Studio albums

- Communion (2015, Tri Angle)
- Excommunicate (2016)
- Les fleurs du mal (2017, Halcyon Veil)
- Life After Death (2018, Halcyon Veil)
- What Dreams May Come (2022, Halcyon Veil)
- Stranger in a Strange Land (2026, Halcyon Veil)

EPs

- Terminator (2012, #FEELINGS)
- Double Dragon (2013, Glacial Sound)
- Baptizm (2015, Tri Angle)
- Toe In The Bardo Pond (2018, Halcyon Veil)

Mixtapes

- Cry Alone Die Alone (2018, Halcyon Veil)
- Bricks in a Drought (2018)
- The Dope Show (2019, Halcyon Veil)
- Kold Summer (2019)
- Star Belly (2019)
