= List of car magazines =

This is a list of notable car magazines.

== Current ==
=== Australia and New Zealand ===
- The Dog & Lemon Guide, a car buyer's guide originally based in New Zealand, since 2010 online only
- Motor, founded in Australia in 1954 as Modern Motor, renamed Motor in 1992
- NZ Classic Car, first issued in 1990
- NZ Performance Car, first published in 1996
- NZV8 magazine, launched in 2005
- Top Gear Australia, published by the Bauer Media Group with a partnership with the BBC. Last issue October 2015
- Wheels, first issued in Australia in 1953

==== Japan ====
- Option, 1981
- Drift Tengoku, 1999

=== Europe ===
==== British ====
- Auto Express, first issued in 1988
- Auto Italia, started in 1995 focussing on Italian marques, manufacturers and designers.
- Autocar, first issued 1895, considered the first car magazine
- Autosport, first issued in 1950, mainly concentrating on motor sport
- Car, established in 1962 as Small Car, renamed Car in 1965
- Car Mechanics, published since 1958
- Classic & Sports Car, first issued in 1982
- Classic Car Weekly, weekly magazine published since 1990
- Evo, first issued 1998
- Fast Car, first issued 1987, covering modified cars
- Octane, first issued in 2003
- Parker's Car Price Guide, founded in 1972
- Performance BMW, launched in 2001
- Practical Classics, published since 1980
- Practical Performance Car
- Top Gear, first issued in 1993; related to the BBC TV programme Top Gear
- Total 911, launched in 2005; focuses on the Porsche 911
- VolksWorld, published since 1987; specialising in Volkswagen cars
- What Car?, first issued in 1973

==== Italy ====
- Al Volante, first issued in 1999.
- Quattroruote, first issued in 1956.

=== North America ===
- Automobile, first issue 1986
- Automotive Industries, founded in 1895 as The Horseless Age, becoming The Automobile in 1909, then Automotive Industries in 1917
- Autoweek, first issued in 1958
- Car and Driver, first issued in 1955 as Sports Cars Illustrated, renamed in 1961
- Car Craft, established in 1953 focusing on hod rods and drag racing
- Cruisin' Style Magazine
- Diesel Power, first published in 2005
- European Cars
- Green Car Journal, published quarterly since 1992
- Hot Rod Magazine
- Motor Trend, first published in 1949
- Road & Track, first published in 1947
- The Drive, focusing on new cars, car culture, and transportation

=== South America ===
==== Brazil ====
- Quatro Rodas
- Autoesporte

== Defunct ==
=== British ===
- Auto Trader, print magazine published between 1975 and 2013, now online only
- iCar, only published two issues in 2011
- Max Power, first issued in 1993, ceased publication in 2011; covered modified cars
- Motor, first issued in 1903 as The Motor; ceased publication in 1988 after it was bought by Autocar
- Performance Car, published 1983 to 1998, with a short-lived relaunch in 2008-09
- Popular Motoring, published from 1962 to 1982.
- Practical Motorist, published from 1934 to 1940, then 1954 to 1997.

=== North American ===
- Automobile Quarterly, published quarterly from spring 1962 until Vol. 51, issue 1 in 2012.
- Sports Cars Illustrated, launched in 1961, renamed Car and Driver in 1965
- Speed Age, published May 1947 to October 1959
