= Classic Car Weekly =

British car newspaper

- Editor: David Simister (2016 - )
- Former editors: Keith Adams (2014–2016); Dave Richards (2010–2014); Peter Simpson (2008–2009); Richard Gunn (2006–2008); Russ Smith (2001–2006); Phil Long (1999–2001); Geoff Browne (1992–1999); Mike Nicks (1990–1992)
- Categories: Automobile magazine
- Frequency: Weekly
- Publisher: Bauer
- Founded: 1990
- Company: Bauer
- Country: United Kingdom
- Based in: Peterborough
- Language: English
- Website: www.classiccarweekly.co.uk
- ISSN: 0959-9738

Classic Car Weekly is a British car newspaper published by the Bauer Media Group.

== History and profile ==
Launched in 1990 by Emap, Classic Car Weekly comes out weekly on a Wednesday, and majors on news and auction coverage, as well as running regular articles on buying, selling, maintaining and driving classic cars. The current editor is David Simister.

It is a newsprint A3-sized publication, and primarily carries a mixture of private-seller advertising and editorial articles. From 2002 to the end of 2009 the title was published under licence by Kelsey Publishing, Bauer Media, which had bought EMAP's consumer magazines in the meantime, took it back from Kelsey at the end of 2009. Classic Car Weekly is now one of a group of UK motoring titles published by Bauer, including Practical Classics, Land Rover Owner, Car, Car Mechanics, Classic Cars, and Modern Classics. Kelsey responded by launching its own weekly competitor, Classic Car Buyer.

The newspaper's average reader owns two classic cars, but also aims to be the first port of call for traders and private owners looking to buy or sell classic cars, and is also used for the latest information about the classic car market and for details of classic cars.

== Regular content and features ==
- The Way We Were: images from the 1950s-1990s and a discussion of the cars featured in the images
- Five Classic Trials: an assessment of a classic car tested by Classic Car Weekly

The following sections regularly appear in Classic Car Weekly every Wednesday: This Week, Out and About, Living With Classics, Buying and Selling

=== This Week ===
- Myth Buster: a regular column which de-bunks popular misconceptions about classic cars
- Products: reviews of classic car-related products and books
- Value My Classic: a weekly assessment of what a classic car - typically belonging to one of the readers - is worth

=== Out and About ===
- Previews ahead of classic car shows from around the UK, such as the Goodwood Revival, or European events, including Techno Classica Essen and the Le Mans Classic.

=== Living With Classics ===
- Our Classics: updates on classic cars owned by members of the Classic Car Weekly team, and contributors including Jon Bentley and Steve Berry
- Mods and Consequences: a rundown of what modifications can be made to classic cars, focusing on a different model each week
- £500 Challenge: updates on running a Ford Puma, Mercedes-Benz S-class and MG ZR bought by Classic Car Weekly for £500 each

=== Buying and Selling ===
- Classic Risers: a look at how values of classic car models have increased over a 15-year period, and a prediction of their future values
- Buying Classics Abroad: an assessment of international classic car prices

== Awards ==
Classic Car Weekly won the Automotive Consumer Publication award at the 2017 Newspress Awards. The title won the award again in the 2024 Newspress Awards.
