= Performance Car (magazine) =

- Final issue cover, July 1998
- Former editors: Ian Wearing; Jesse Crosse; Dave Calderwood; Paul Clark; Brett Fraser; Dominic Holtam
- Categories: Automobile magazine
- Frequency: Monthly
- Publisher: Ascential
- First issue: October 1983
- Final issue: July 1998
- Country: United Kingdom
- Language: English
- ISSN: 0265-6183
- OCLC: 11201781

Performance Car
- Editors: Dominic Holtam; Chris Knapman; Dan Prosser; Max Earey
- Categories: Automobile magazine
- Frequency: Monthly
- Publisher: Unity Media
- First issue: March 2008
- Country: United Kingdom
- Language: English

Performance Car, commonly abbreviated to PC, was an automobile magazine from the United Kingdom published by EMAP between October 1983 and July 1998. As suggested by the title, the magazine focussed on the high performance sector of the car market, from hot hatches through to supercars.

A magazine of the same name was launched in 2008.

== Original magazine ==
AGB Business Publications Limited launched Performance Car in October 1983. It replaced Hot Car magazine, a magazine that focussed on the tuned & modified car scene. The change of name came about due to a slight shift of focus to manufacturer-built performance cars. Early issues were titled Performance Car (incorporating Hot Car). The editor at launch was Ian Wearing.

In 1986, Jeremy Clarkson became a freelance columnist for the magazine. He would later go on to present the BBC motoring TV series Top Gear, but continued to write for Performance Car until 1994, when the BBC issued him an ultimatum following the launch of Top Gear magazine.

In the mid-1990s, the magazine changed its style, aiming to bring in a larger readership. The move backfired, and they later admitted they "went looking for extra readers that weren't there, and pissed off several thousand that were". Attempts to revert were somewhat successful in regaining readers, but publishers EMAP decided that as performance cars were being covered by other magazines there were not enough readers to justify keeping Performance Car. The final issue, July 1998, was published on 12 June 1998 before the magazine was merged into EMAP's other motoring magazine Car. Following one issue of Car with a Performance Car supplement, it remained much the same magazine as it was before, with little influence from Performance Car.

Following its demise, several of the writers from Performance Car, including Richard Meaden, John Barker and Harry Metcalfe went on to found a new magazine, Evo, which was launched at the end of 1998 and covered similar topics to those of Performance Car.

== 2008 relaunch ==
Performance Car magazine was re-launched in 2008 by Unity Media. The editorial team was made up of Dominic Holtam, Chris Knapman, Dan Prosser, Duncan Clarke, James Harrison and Max Earey. Dominic Holtam was editor of the publication after his spells at other Unity Media magazines including Performance BMW. His aim was to continue the high-quality aspect of the magazine whilst retaining a real-world approach. The magazine closed once again at the end of 2009.

Dan Prosser subsequently founded his own online publication, Mud, Snow and Tar.
