= Joshua Chuquimia Crampton =

Aymara-American experimental musician (born 1983)

- Born: 1983 (age 42–43); San Diego, California, US
- Genres: psychedelic rock; experimental; Andean Music; avant-garde
- Occupation: Musician
- Years active: 2011–present

Joshua Chuquimia Crampton (born 1983) is an American musician. He makes up one half of Los Thuthanaka, along with his sibling Chuquimamani-Condori. The two have released their self-titled debut in 2025, followed up by an EP, Wak'a, the following year. Since 2020 Crampton has released five solo studio albums, most recently Anata in 2026. He is a member of the Pakajaqi nation of the Aymara people. Crampton's musical style has been described as psychedelic and experimental.

== Early life ==
Joshua Chuquimia Crampton was born in 1983 in San Diego, California. He is the brother of musician and artist Elysia Crampton, also known as Chuquimamani-Condori. The two siblings identify with the Pakajaqi nation of the Aymara people. His family heritage is rooted in the town of Calacoto, located in the Pacajes province. During his childhood, Crampton lived in a rural area of Mexico, an experience he has associated with his later creative development. He eventually moved back to the United States and is currently based in Northern California.

Crampton's early musical development was influenced by his grandparents, from whom he learned traditional Andean rhythms and took part in ceremonial musical practices. He has identified the first two concerts he attended as a child, those of the Bolivian folk group Los Kjarkas and the American rock band the Smashing Pumpkins, citing the high volume of both performances as a formative influence on his own use of loudness. Aside from his musical background, Crampton has studied martial arts, which he has stated influences the physical nature of his guitar performances.

== Career ==
=== 2011–2021: Early career and solo works ===
Crampton's professional musical activity began with collaborative work and writing under various names. Around 2011, he planned a collection of solo guitar pieces that remained unreleased as he focused on other projects. During this period, he frequently contributed guitar work to the recordings of his sibling Chuquimamani-Condori. In 2020, Crampton released his debut solo album, The Heart's Wash, through the multimedia studio Puro Fantasía. The project is a 96-minute collection of 15 solo guitar compositions recorded to tape. Crampton utilized a non-traditional notation system for these works, employing hand-drawn images and sequences of "events" rather than standard musical notes to facilitate improvisation. The album features electric and acoustic guitars, often tuned to A# or D, and includes tracks named after animals like the axolotl and the Carnotaurus to reflect the nocturnal atmosphere of its recording.

Crampton released his second album, 4, on January 1, 2021, also via Puro Fantasía, which consists of four extended tracks totaling 67 minutes. The record has been described by PopMatters' Daniel Bromfield as "landscape music", featuring tracks such as "Fantasy IV" and "Jamp'Atu Colores", which transition between frantic guitar sections and extended, repetitive ambient passages. In an interview, Crampton said that the album's compositions were approached in a more "straightforward and accessible" manner than his previous release, despite their length and abrupt editing. He also described the album as conceptually centered on a ceremonial journey involving the Pachamama. That same year, he composed the score for the collaborative film Amaru's Tongue: Daughter (2021) and presented work at international venues including Haus der Kunst in Munich and Auto Italia in London.

=== 2022–2024: Stylistic expansion ===
His 2023 album Profundo Amor has been described as combining solo guitar with tape manipulation and noise textures, in which layered guitar parts interact with elements of distortion and ambient sound. In an interview, he told that the album was influenced by his collaborative work with Los Thuthanaka, an experimental duo formed with his sibling Chuquimamani-Condori, particularly in its expanded use of effects and multi-guitar arrangements, with each composition written for three guitars. He also described the album as having been developed over a longer period than his previous releases in order to incorporate a wider range of emotional material. The album was dedicated to his daughter, who had not yet been born, and her mother, and was conceived around themes of anticipation and transformation.

Crampton released the album Estrella Por Estrella in 2024. The record has been described as consisting primarily of guitar-based compositions characterized by dense layering and distortion. Crampton stated that the album reflected a period of personal and emotional change, and described it as a culmination of artistic development, using celestial imagery as an allegory for themes of spiritual and physical love. Comparisons to shoegaze had been made, although this was not an intentional influence in the album's composition, with Crampton writing that he was instead "simply trying to make powerful emotional music with loud guitar sounds that are layered like a ceremonial procession, symphonies of distortion".

=== 2025–present: Los Thuthanaka, wider recognition and recent releases ===
On March 22, 2025, he and his sibling surprise-released a self-titled collaborative album under the name Los Thuthanaka, which was made available exclusively on Bandcamp. The album incorporates elements of traditional Andean genres associated with the duo's Aymara heritage, including huayño, caporal, and kullawada, reworking them in experimental electronic forms. In a 2025 Hearing Things interview, Crampton described his production approach as focused on the "sonic potential" of recorded sound, and the publication noted continuity between Estrella por Estrella and his work with Los Thuthanaka. It was met with universal acclaim from music critics, with Pitchfork naming it the best album of 2025 and The Wire placing it third on its year-end list, while Resident Advisor included it among the top electronic releases of the 21st century, placing it tenth.

Crampton released his fifth solo album, Anata, on February 4, 2026, two days ahead of its originally scheduled release date. The self-released record was initially distributed through Bandcamp, before becoming available on other streaming platforms on February 26. It was preceded by the single "Ch'uwanchaña El Golpe Final", issued on January 21, 2026. Consisting of seven instrumental tracks, the album is dedicated to the Andean ceremony of the same name, which honors Pachamama and emphasizes the principle of reciprocity between humans and nature. Crampton wrote about the guitarwork on Anata, writing that what drew him to the disturted fuzzy guitar tones was "wanting everything to be louder and all-consuming like ocean waves, fire or a star exploding". Anata received positive reviews from music critics, with Safi Bugel describing the album as "an ear-splitting haze that heals as it hurts" in his review for The Guardian, and Pitchfork's Daniel Bromfield writing that Anata is "some of the most elemental, in-the-red music ever recorded".

On April 3, 2026, Crampton and his sibling released the followup to 2025's Los Thuthanaka, the Wak'a EP. In their review for Pitchfork, Sasha Geffen wrote that the EP "commemorates their work to preserve Aymara lore", and noting that the EP can be seen as a companion to their 2025 album.

== Discography ==
=== Studio albums ===
- The Heart's Wash (2020, self-released)
- 4 (2021, self-released)
- Profundo Amor (2023, self-released)
- Estrella Por Estrella (2024, self-released)
- Anata (2026, self-released)

=== Scores ===
- Amaru's Tongue: Daughter OST (2021, self-released)

=== With Los Thuthanaka ===
==== Studio albums ====
- Los Thuthanaka (2025, self-released)

==== Extended plays ====
- Wak'a (2026, self-released)
