= Paul Larkins =

English middle-distance runner

Personal information
- Nationality: British (English)
- Born: 19 May 1963 (age 63) Hackney, England

Sport
- Sport: Athletics
- Event: middle-distance
- Club: Wolverhampton and Bilston AC

Paul Larkins (born 19 May 1963) is a retired English middle-distance runner and a sub 4 minute miler. He still ranks in the all time British Top 30 for 1,500m.

== Biography ==
Running for the Oklahoma State Cowboys track and field team, Larkins won the 1986 mile run at the NCAA Division I Indoor Track and Field Championships.

Larkins finished third behind John Gladwin in the 1500 metres event at the 1986 AAA Championships.

After his competitive career, Larkins went into journalism becoming Editor of both Athletics Weekly and Running Fitness. He is now Production Editor on Practical Classics, a classic car publication and Editor of Trail Running, an off-road running magazine.

== Personal bests ==
Distance	Mark	Date
800 m	1:47.13	1984
1000 m	2:18.35	1985
1500 m	3:35.94	1987
Mile	3:56.65	1987
2000 m	5:01.48	1988
3000 m	7:47.54	1989
