= Athletics Weekly =

UK sports magazine

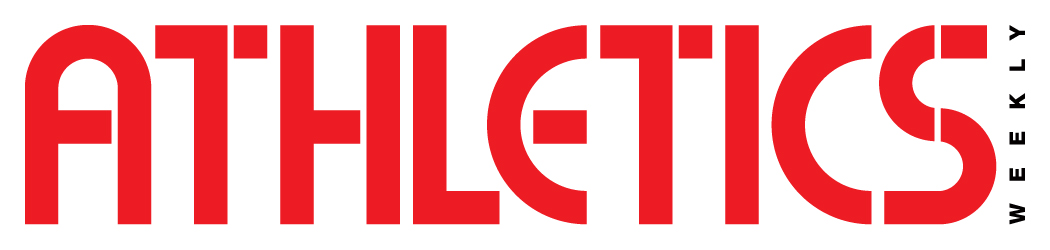
- Athletics Weekly masthead
- Editor: Jason Henderson
- Categories: Track and field
- Frequency: Monthly
- Publisher: Athletics Weekly Ltd
- Founded: 1945
- First issue: December 1945
- Country: United Kingdom
- Based in: Farnham, Surrey
- Language: English
- Website: Athletics Weekly
- ISSN: 0004-6671

AW (formerly Athletics Weekly) is a monthly track and field magazine published in the United Kingdom by Athletics Weekly Limited. The magazine covers news, results, fixtures, coaching and product advice for all aspects of track and field, cross-country, road racing and race walking. Between 1950 and 2020, it was called Athletics Weekly and was published weekly.

In addition to its main website, Athletics Weekly partners with the UK Athletics site Power Of 10 and owns records data website GBR Athletics.

== Jimmy Green years (1945 to 1987) ==
The magazine was started as a monthly by PW "Jimmy" Green in 1945, with the first few issues produced from the back bedroom of a bungalow in Kent which Green shared with his wife, Pam.

With post-war paper rationing still in force, Green used a mixture of determination and devilment to launch the first, self-published edition. It was numbered Volume II Issue I, but this was a deliberate error to fool the government into thinking the magazine had existed before the war. There was, of course, never a Volume I.

Green was also told by athletics and publishing experts that the idea would never work. “I thanked them for their advice and completely ignored it. I was pig headed,” said Green. Green's magazine went weekly in January 1950, published on Fridays, and has never failed to come out since.

In 1968, Green (who died in 1998, aged 88) passed the editorship to Mel Watman, who in a near-20-year reign steered the title to some success and continued to build its reputation for accuracy and authority.

Independently published by Kent Art Printers in a distinctive A5, pocket-sized format, the magazine reached its peak of popularity in the mid-1980s - coinciding with the marathon running boom following the first London Marathon in 1981 - selling some 25,000 copies per week.

== Emap years (1987 to 1999) ==
The title was bought in 1987 by Emap and moved from Kent to Peterborough, where the management sought to repeat the publishing success of its Smash Hits pop title and re-launched AW as an A4 title aimed at teenagers. Emap's youthful relaunch was very unpopular with traditional readers and damaged the magazine's reputation.

Mel Watman remained in a consultant role until he jointly launched ‘Athletics Today’, at which time the only other pre-Emap member of staff also left the magazine, after a marketing leaflet flagged him up as having joined ‘Athletics Today’ while still employed by Emap. New members of journalistic staff included UK international athletes Paul Larkins and Martin Gillingham and former English Schools Cross Country top 300 finisher and launch editor of North-East athletics magazine ‘InForm’ David Ogle. By late 1989, one-third of sales had been lost. Keith Nelson, Emap's choice as editor, moved on to edit ‘Country Walking’ magazine and subsequently launch ‘Trail Walker’ magazine with Emap, the latter which Ogle joined, subsequently edited and changed its name to ‘Trail’.

Aware of its loyal following's disgruntlement with the re-launch of Athletics Weekly, in 1989 Eddie Kulukundis funded the launch of a rival title, Athletics Today, jointly edited by Randall Northam and Mel Watman: for the first time in its existence, Athletics Weekly now faced competition.

Despite the sport's continued successes through the 1990s and the ultimate demise of its rival in 1993, Athletics Weekly struggled in vain to regain its reputation, even though results were published only days after events took place - whereas results in the original title could be published weeks afterwards.

== Descartes years (1999 to 2010) ==
After a decade's ownership, Emap admitted defeat and in April 1999 licensed the title to Descartes Publishing, a company established by businessman and athletics enthusiast Matthew Fraser Moat for the purpose. Descartes kept the title in Peterborough and went on to purchase the title outright in 2003. In February 2005 the magazine was awarded Sports BrandLeader status and in December 2005 Athletics Weekly celebrated its 60th birthday with a charity calendar and a special 100 page edition.

In 2006 the title changed its publication date back to a Thursday, and increased in size to 64 pages a week; in 2007 an online digital version was launched and in 2009 Athletics Weekly became the first magazine in the world to have all its content commercially available on the iPhone. In 2010 the AW app was relaunched for the iPad.

A sister company, Athletics Data Limited, was formed to manage the commercial rights of Athletics Weekly's results data and in 2009 Athletics Data was appointed to run Power of 10, a statistical website, for UK Athletics.

Taking advantage of the renewed interest in the sport generated by London 2012 and Usain Bolt, the magazine was "highly commended" in the "Brand Extension of The Year" category at the 2009 Independent Publisher Awards and won a "Media Pioneer Award" at the 2010 Specialist Media Show.

In January 2010, the magazine celebrated 60 years as a weekly magazine.

== Athletics Weekly years (2010 to date) ==
In May 2010, ownership of the magazine passed to a new company "Athletics Weekly Limited", with a new publisher Richard Hughes. In 2015 the magazine was bought by The Great Run Company and they appointed 1984 Olympic 3000m silver medallist Wendy Sly as managing director.

In 2020, The Great Run Company sold Athletics Weekly and it was bought by the 21six Group. Publication of the magazine was briefly suspended during the early months of the Covid pandemic and while the magazine changed ownership, but 21six then relaunched the magazine as a monthly title in October 2020. Since 2020 Euan Crumley has edited the monthly print magazine with long-time editor of the weekly publication, Jason Henderson, head of digital.

== Editors ==
- PW "Jimmy" Green - 1945-1968
- Mel Watman - 1968-1986
- Barry Trowbridge - 1986-1987
- Keith Nelson - 1987-1989
- Steven Downes - 1989-1991
- Paul Richardson - 1991-1992
- David Clarke - 1993-1994
- Paul Larkins - 1994-1995
- Nigel Walsh - 1995-2001
- Jason Henderson - 2001 to 2020
- Euan Crumley - 2020 to date
