= Stephen Bayley =

Welsh architecture critic (born 1951)

Stephen Paul Bayley FRIBA (born 13 October 1951) is a Welsh writer and critic, known particularly for his commentary on architecture and design. He was founding CEO of the Design Museum in London in 1989, and has been a regular architecture, art and design critic for newspapers and magazines such as The Listener, The Observer, The Spectator and Car.

== Childhood and education ==
Bayley was born on 13 October 1951 in Cardiff, Wales and spent his childhood years in Liverpool, England, attending Quarry Bank High School for Boys. He was inspired by Liverpool's architecture and its built environment. When Bayley was 15, he wrote a letter to John Lennon, who had also attended Quarry Bank as a teenager. Bayley's description of his English teacher analysing Beatles lyrics in class helped to inspire "I Am the Walrus".

He was later educated at Manchester University and the University of Liverpool School of Architecture, where his mentor was the historian and conservationist Quentin Hughes, whose obituary he wrote in The Guardian, 16 May 2004.

== Career ==
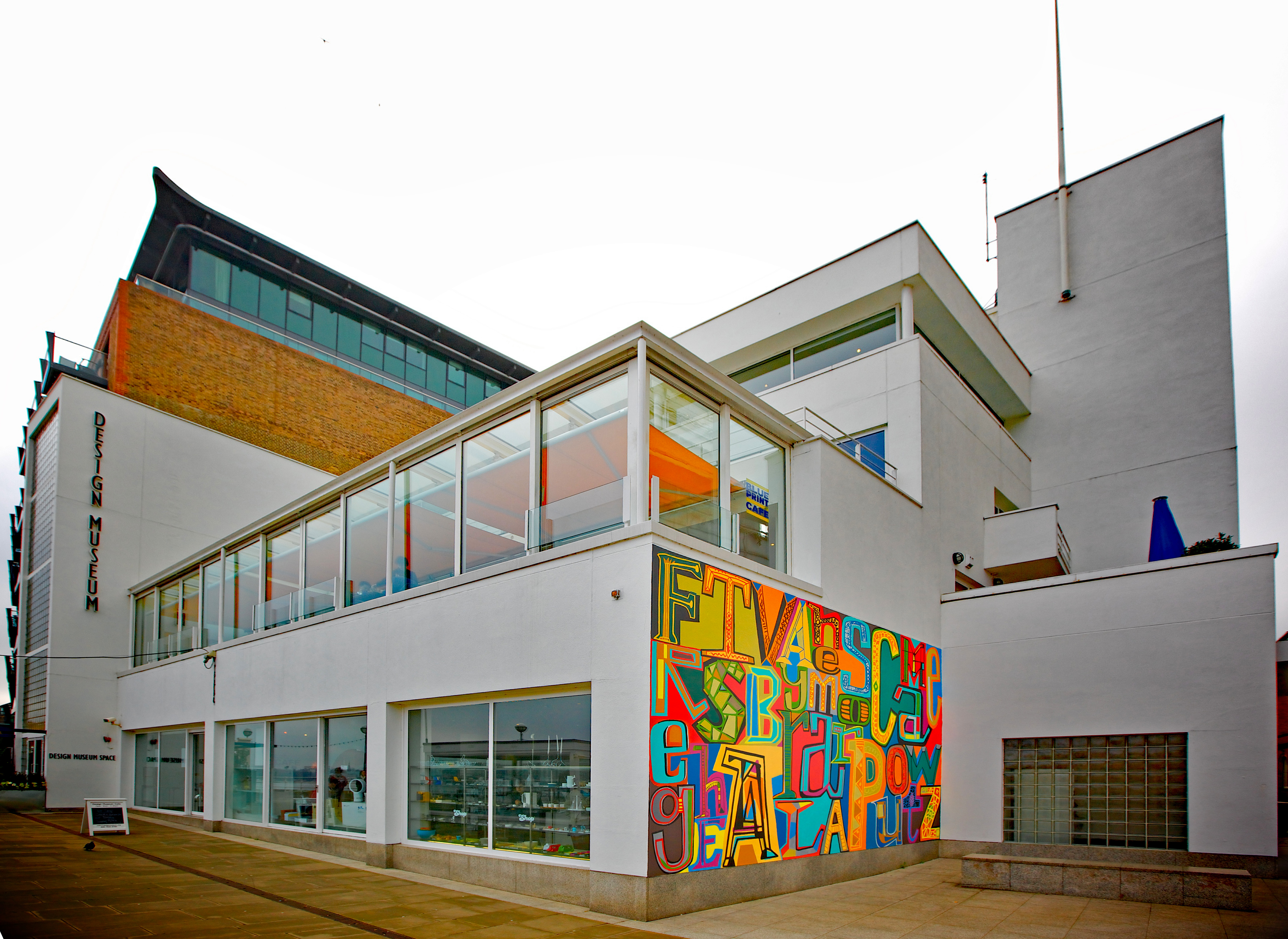
The old Design Museum, for which Bayley was the founding CEO

In the 1970s, he was a lecturer in the history of art at the University of Kent. He first became prominent as an authority on style and design when, in 1979, he began a collaboration with Habitat founder Sir Terence Conran to promote a more intelligent awareness of design. This led to the creation of The Boilerhouse Project, at the Victoria and Albert Museum, which became London's most successful gallery of the 1980s. The Boilerhouse Project was Britain's first permanent exhibition of design, host to more than 20 exhibitions in five years, including Ford Motor Company, Sony, Issey Miyake, Coca-Cola, and Taste. The Boilerhouse evolved into a unique Design Museum of which Bayley was the founding CEO, and which was opened by Margaret Thatcher in 1989.

He was appointed as the creative director of the exhibition at the Millennium Dome in Greenwich. After a series of disputes, he resigned in 1998, citing ministerial interference. On his resignation, he said of the dome that "it could turn out to be crap", and accused government minister Peter Mandelson of "running the project like a dictator".

=== Writing ===
In 2007, Bayley became The Observer's architecture and design correspondent. He writes for a huge range of national and international consumer, trade and professional publications including: The Spectator, The Times, The Independent, The Daily Telegraph, Sud Deutsches Zeitung, GQ, Car, Financial Times, Vanity Fair, and Octane. He has been a contributing editor of GQ since the magazine was launched. He has been a columnist in The Times and The Independent, as well as the art critic of The Listener and the architecture critic of The Observer.

As of 2020 he was design critic of The Spectator.

=== Television ===
His 1980 BBC2 documentary Little Boxes was the first treatment of design on television. It was produced by Patrick Uden and included unique interviews with Dieter Rams, Ettore Sottsass, Raymond Loewy, and Tom Wolfe.

He has also appeared on television series such as Have I Got News for You and Grumpy Old Men.

== Recognition ==
In 1989, Bayley was made a Chevalier de L'Ordre des Arts et des Lettres, France's top artistic honour, by the French Minister of Culture and in 1995 he was Periodical Publishers Association Columnist of the Year.

He is an Honorary Fellow of the RIBA, an Honorary Fellow of the University of Wales, Chairman of The Royal Fine Arts Commission Trust, and a Fellow of Liverpool Institute for Performing Arts.

The American author and journalist Tom Wolfe said of him, "I don't know anybody with more interesting observations about style, taste and contemporary design".

== Opinions ==
In an article for The Times in 2018, Bayley wrote that if Lord Elgin had not removed the Elgin Marbles from the Parthenon, they would have been eventually destroyed due to a combination of war and natural decay. Bayley also argued against their repatriation to Greece.

In his Observer column of 22 March 2009, Bayley wrote that: "Botticelli's model for The Birth of Venus was a common Florentine hooker called Simonetta Vespucci, painted nude to titillate his client". He was arguing against the motion that: "Britain has become indifferent to beauty" proposed by Roger Scruton and David Starkey, who held an image of The Birth of Venus next to an image of the British supermodel Kate Moss, in order to demonstrate how "cruddy" British culture is.

Following the 2025 unveiling of the new branding livery for the UK's state-owned railway company, Great British Railways, Bayley said "It's atrocious. A mad dog's breakfast". He added that "A livery is branding and branding is all about associations and expectations", telling The Telegraph that "In this sense, they've got it right. It projects the values of the sponsoring organisation: artless, careless, clumsy, unintelligent and uncoordinated".

== Personal life ==
As of 2008 he lived in a house in South West London with his wife, Flo, and their two children, Bruno and Coco. After living there for 25 years, he said that the house was still not finished.

== Selected publications ==
- In Good Shape: Style in Industrial Products 1900 to 1960. Design Council, London, 1979. ISBN 0850720958
- The Albert Memorial (1981)
- Harley Earl and The Dream Machine (1983)
- The Conran Directory of Design (1985)
- Sex Drink and Fast Cars (1986)
- Commerce and Culture (1989)
- Taste (1991)
- Labour Camp (1998)
- General Knowledge (2000)
- Sex: A cultural history (2000)
- A Dictionary of Idiocy (2003)
- Life’s a Pitch (2007)
- Design: Intelligence made visible (2007)
- Cars (2008)
- Work: The Building of the Channel Tunnel Rail Link (2008)
- Woman as Design (2009)
- Liverpool: Shaping the city (2010)
- La Dolce Vita (2011)
- Ugly: The Aesthetics of Everything (2012).
- Death Drive – there are no accidents (2016).
- Life’s a Pitch (3rd edition, 2017).
- Taste – the secret meaning of things (2nd edition, 2017).
- Signs of Life – why brands matter (2017).
- How To Steal Fire (2019).
