= Jenny Jefferies =

British cookbook author

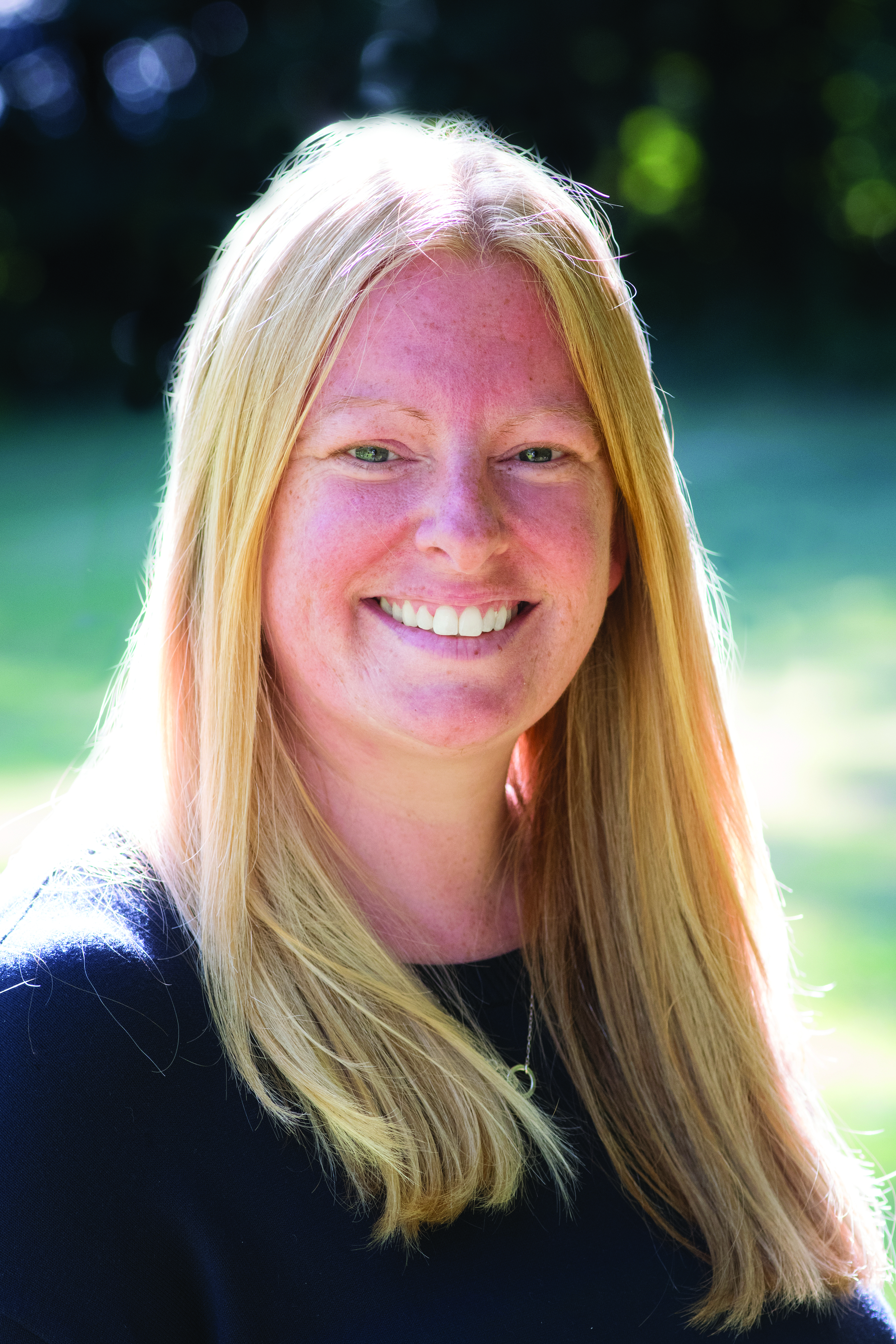
- Jenny Jefferies
- Occupations: Cookbook author, columnist, producer, campaigner
- Writing career
- Language: English
- Notable works: For the Love of the Land, For the Love of the Sea, Islands in a Common Sea
- Notable awards: Woman & Home Book Award (2021), Guild of Food Writers Award (2022), NYC Big Book Award (2024), Gourmand Award (2025)

Jenny Jefferies is a cookbook author, food columnist, producer and campaigner based in South Cambridgeshire.

== Work ==
Jefferies writes a monthly food column for the Cambridge Independent featuring recipes such as mackerel and venison. She writes a bi-monthly article and an international chef interview series for the Country & Town House online magazine. Examples of her column include "Farm Diversification" and "Organic September". She writes for Rural Life magazine, featuring recipes from her cookbooks. She presented her own radio show at Black Cat Radio, a local Cambridgeshire radio station (2023–2025).

As well as the articles Jefferies writes herself, she has received recognition for her endeavours. This includes articles by The Sunday Post, Chatting Food online magazine, The Hunts Post, That's Farming magazine and Kids Country online magazine.

Jefferies is a producer of a documentary series based on her 2024 book Islands in a Common Sea.

Jefferies is leading the first fishing-themed British 24-hour social media campaign, in collaboration with Fishing News, #Fish24. The next one will be held on 14 May 2026.

== Books ==
- For the Love of the Land: A Cook Book to Celebrate British Farmers and Their Food. Meze Publishing. (2020) ISBN 978-1-910863-58-9.
- For The Love Of The Sea: A cook book to celebrate the British seafood community and their food. Meze Publishing. (2021) ISBN 978-1910863756.
- For The Love Of The Land II: A cook book to celebrate the British farming community and their food. Meze Publishing. (2022) ISBN 978-1910863923.
- For The Love Of The Sea II : A cook book to celebrate the British seafood community and their food. Meze Publishing. (2023) ISBN 978-1910863626.
- Islands In A Common Sea: Stories of Farming, Fishing and Food Around The World. Meze Publishing. (2024) ISBN 978-1915538208.

== Awards ==
- Woman & Home Book Award in 2021 for For The Love Of The Land in the category Best Cookbook
- Named as a Guild of Food Writers member in 2022.
- For The Love Of The Sea was Best Self-Published Work in the Guild of Food Writers Annual Awards 2022.
- Silver in the category of Best Newcomer of the Year, Community Radio Awards 2023
- For the Love of the Land II won the Best Indie Book Award in 2023 in the category of Non-fiction: cooking
- Culture Champion, SheInspires Awards 2023
- NYC Big Book Award in 2024 for Islands in a Common Sea in the category Cookbooks - International.
- International Impact Book Award in 2024 for Islands in a Common Sea in the category Sustainability.
- Gourmand Award in 2025 for Islands in a Common Sea in the category Best European Fundraising Book
- Best Cooking/Cookbook in the 2025 Best Indie Book Awards
