= Wak'a (EP) =

EP by Los Thuthanaka
- Released: April 3, 2026
- Genre: Experimental
- Length: 18:27
- Label: Self-released

Los Thuthanaka chronology
Los Thuthanaka (2025)	Wak'a (2026)

Chuquimamani-Condori chronology
Edits (2025)	Wak'a (2026)

Joshua Chuquimia Crampton chronology
Anata (2026)	Wak'a (2026)

Wak'a is the debut extended play (EP) by the American duo Los Thuthanaka, consisting of siblings Chuquimamani-Condori and Joshua Chuquimia Crampton.

== Background and release ==
Los Thuthanaka is a project by siblings Chuquimamani-Condori and Joshua Chuquimia Crampton. On March 22, 2025, the group surprise-released their self-titled debut album, available exclusively on Bandcamp. The album blends elements of traditional Andean genres linked with the duo's Aymara heritage, such as huayño, caporal, and kullawada, with experimental electronic music. The album was released to critical acclaim from music publications; Pitchfork named it the best album of 2025, The Wire placed it third on its year-end list, and Resident Advisor included it among the top electronic releases of the 21st century, placing it tenth.

Over several years preceding the release, the two collected Aymara oral histories through direct retellings from community members alongside archival transcriptions. This work produced a 14-page Aymara-language text, Qutax janïr Intix Yurkipänxa ("The Lake Before the Sun Was Born"), described by the artists as an assemblage of variant narratives; the text accompanies the EP as a digital booklet. The EP Wak'a was self-released on April 3, 2026, distributed digitally via Bandcamp, where it was made available for streaming and purchase. It comprises three tracks with a total duration of approximately 18 and a half minutes.

== Critical reception ==
Professional ratings
Review scores
Source	Rating
Pitchfork	8.0/10

Sasha Geffen from Pitchfork characterized Wak'a as an extension of Los Thuthanaka's "distinct, boundaryless sound explorations", framing the EP as a companion piece that "commemorates their work to preserve Aymara lore".

== Track listing ==
No.	Title	Length
1.	"Quta"	5:20
2.	"Wara Wara"	8:40
3.	"Ay Kawkinpachasa?"	4:27
Total length:		18:27
