= Power Without Glory (2015 book) =

2015 non-fiction book by Terry Wright

Power Without Glory: Racing the Big-Twin Cooper
- Author: Terry Wright
- Language: English
- Subject: Cooper racing cars
- Genre: Motorsports
- Publisher: Loose Fillings Sydney
- Publication date: 2015
- Pages: 352 (first edition)
- ISBN: 978-0-9943661-0-8

Power Without Glory: Racing the Big-Twin Cooper is a non-fiction book about the early history of the modern racing car. It aims to document the influences behind the first Cooper racing cars and the development of record-breaking motorcycles, hillclimb and sprint specials, and dirt-track speedway cars before the Second World War.

== Reception ==
Mark Dixon and David Lillywhite of Octane said that "the Cooper story is well told within the 342 pages, but it's the surrounding history that really adds to the tale", and felt that the book covers the history of the cars within the contemporary social context. A review in The Automobile said "Wright gives a balanced picture of the light racing car renaissance". A review in Speedscene magazine describes the book as "Entertainingly written and superbly laid out ... the book is a visual treat as well as being a meticulously researched, in-depth survey of the history and development of the motorcycle V-twin engine in motorcar competition." The book received an Award of Distinction in 2016 from the Society of Automotive Historians. It was shortlisted by Octane magazine for Publication of the Year in the International Historic Motoring Awards of 2016.
