= Popular Motoring =

British car magazine

- Popular Motoring, October 1980
- Frequency: Monthly
- Publisher: Mercury House
- First issue: April 1962
- Final issue: 1982
- Country: United Kingdom

Popular Motoring was a British car magazine founded in April 1962 by Mercury House. It covered a broad spectrum of motoring topics, including buyer's guides and DIY maintenance advice. During the 1970s it was retitled Popular Motoring & Practical Car Maintenance, later reverting to its original title. The magazine was taken over by EMAP and eventually merged with Practical Motorist in 1982.
