= Hans G. Lehmann =

German photographer

Hans Georg Lehmann (born 1939, in Dessau, Germany) is a retired German photographer who is noted for his spy shots of prototype automobiles whilst they undergo testing stages, frequenting in locations where test sessions are likely to occur. These photographs regularly appear in automobile magazines.

As a result of his success, a number of photographers have followed his example. Because of this, a number of major car manufacturers developed their own testing facilities to prevent people from taking photographs of their secretive prototypes and pre-production cars.

His nickname in the industry amongst others is Handy Hans, carparazzo, car spy, prototype hunter and is widely regarded as a pioneer of the car spy photography and the best known of them all.

Since his retirement in 2008, he continued to run his photo syndication company.

== Biography ==
Lehmann was born in the former East Germany. At a young age, his family moved to Wolfsburg where he developed his interest for cars. He later moved to Hamburg in the 1960s, where he worked as a photographer for a news agency and freelanced for daily newspapers. In his break, he frequently visited his parents, usually taking his camera along. Whilst there in 1963, at the nearby Volkswagen factory, he used a 300mm lens to take some photographs of an unusual looking car near the factory. His employer became uneasy about the photographs, and after declining them, Lehmann sold them to the tabloid newspaper Bild for a healthy sum of money. The prototype in question turned out to be a proposed replacement for the Volkswagen Beetle.

He continued to combine his photojournalism with his stint as a spy photographer.

== Secrecy ==
Despite having access to or having their own proving grounds, prior to a launch, car manufacturers test their car model on the open road, making it easy prey for Lehmann, unhindered by trespass laws.

Commonly he frequented Death Valley or in desert areas in the United States, Australia or North Africa in the summer, as well as Alaska or Scandinavia in the winter, where car manufacturers frequently test for temperature tolerance. He also frequents the Nürburgring.

Although secretive about his sources, they are employees of car manufacturers, some of whom have had their contract terminated as a result. Lehmann's other sources are informants, including those in petrol stations and hotels.

Lehmann also employs photographic assistants to work with him and prefers to keeps a low profile, shunning publicity

Lehmann's most important piece of equipment is a ladder. Aside from his camera, his other important equipment is a 1000mm lens and a motor drive. In his job, Lehmann never works on his own, he is assisted by a minder who operates their hire car. He also sits in a tree if possible, which resulted in him being injured when spying on a testing session of a Ford Sierra at their test track in Cologne.

His biggest scoop of all was the Volkswagen Golf, on a public road in Spain in 1973, the Mark II in Arizona, and the Mark III in Austria. His other best known shots were of the Ford Sierra, and the Ford Mondeo at a gas station in Las Vegas, Nevada whilst staking out Death Valley.

It is not uncommon for Lehman to face hostilities from car manufacturers and has faced police arrests in his career. He was detained overnight once in Algeria for espionage charges for a photograph of an Audi 100.

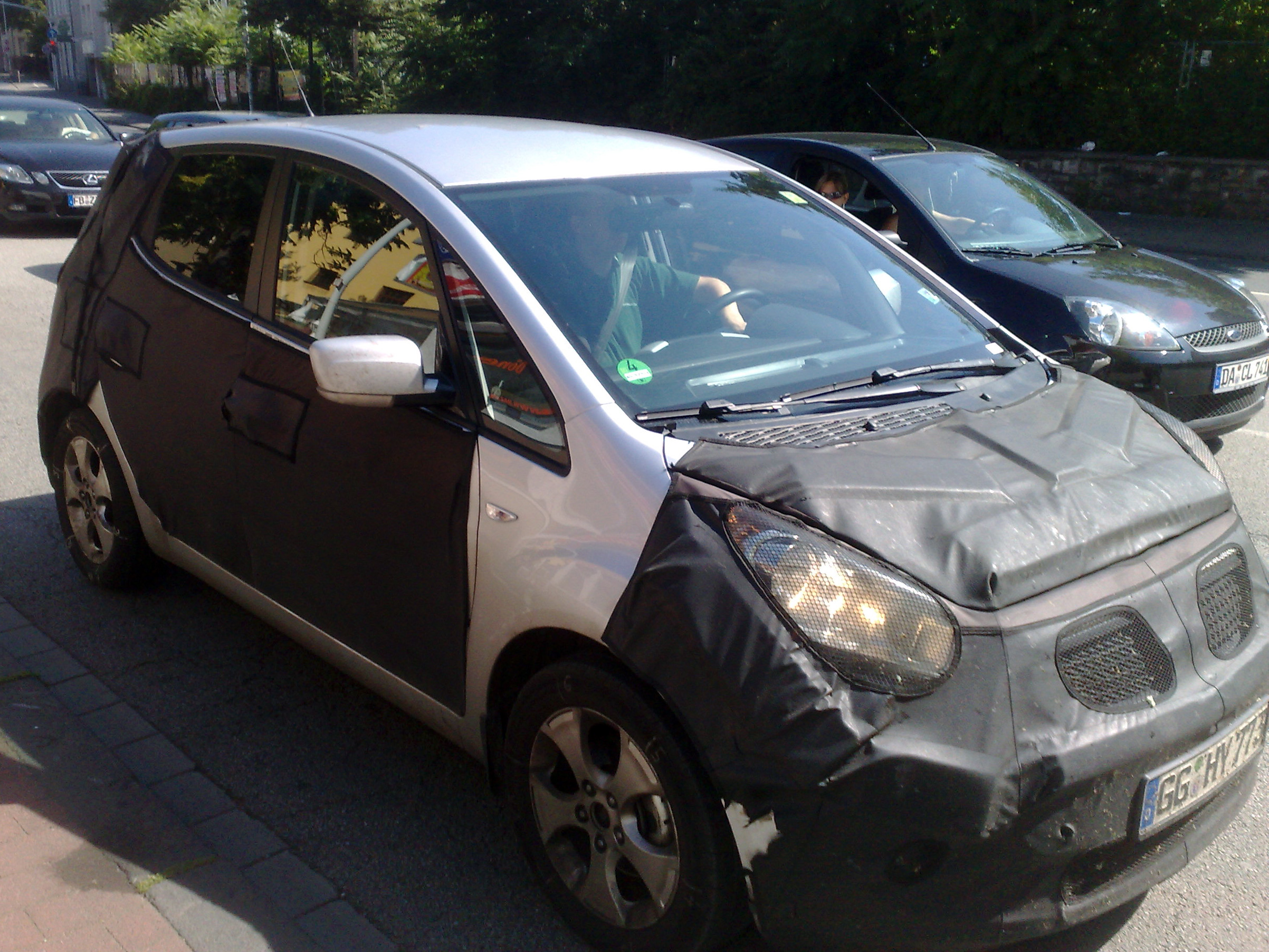
One of several lengths a car manufacturer will go to keep their development mule away from the lens of photographers like Lehmann.

Due to its high development costs in the midst of a competitive market, these testing sessions are intended to be as secretive as possible to prevent competitors gaining an advantage and sometimes developing a similar vehicle of their own. It has become a common practice for car manufacturers to mask details of their prototypes to make the car very difficult to be recognised, sometimes using "protection cars" that drive alongside the test car to block the view of the prototype from photographers. Aside from the motoring press, Lehmann's photographs have appeared in the German news magazine Stern and additionally had been offered to sell his photographs to rival Japanese car manufacturers.

Manufacturers have also resorted to placing the badge of a rival manufacturer in an attempt to foil photographers like Lehmann, and sometimes placing engines and suspension systems inside the bodyshells of rival manufacturers. They cancelled advertisements at magazines who dared to feature Lehmann's photographs as retaliatory measures

== Legal issues ==
Manufacturers such as BMW, Volkswagen, Rover and Porsche have unsuccessfully attempted to take legal action against Lehmann for industrial espionage. As a result of his and other photographer's activities who followed his example, car manufacturers have become more secretive, some resorting to developing their private testing sites. Renault for example, used a secret rocket-testing site for cold weather testing in Kiruna, near the Arctic Circle in northern Sweden. Audi conduct their tests on their own proving ground, their cars clad in full-cover canvas blankets. Private testing facilities make it difficult for photographers to enter the site without authorisation. In addition to private sites, car manufacturers test their cars dead at night and in dawn on public roads.

Volkswagen in the mid-seventies have attempted to have Lehmann's driving licence suspended, alleging that he drove dangerously and blocked a road while photographing one of its prototypes, when it was revealed that one of the car manufacturer's test driver had blocked the road. Rover attempted to obtain a High Court order to search the house of one of his British associates, citing a breach of copyright. One unnamed British car manufacturer went as far as recruiting John Stalker, a retired deputy chief constable of Greater Manchester Police to attempt to discover the source of the information.

== Recent times ==
Lehmann reportedly announced his retirement in April 2008, but continued to run his picture syndication company, Lehmann Photo Syndication.

He currently resides in the outskirts of Hamburg in a house by the River Elbe with his wife and business partner, Christa, also a photographer. His favourite cars amongst his collections are the Porsche 911 Speedster and the Mercedes S-Class Coupe.

He published a book in 1985 titled Testfahrer und Autospione: Abenteuer mit geheimen Automobilen (Test Drivers and Car Spies: Adventures with Secret Automobiles).
