= LRO =

LRO may mean:

- Lunar Reconnaissance Orbiter, a NASA spacecraft launched in 2009
- Large receive offload, in computer networking, a technique for increasing inbound throughput
- Light railway order, an order made under the Light Railways Act 1896 for the construction or operation of a railway in the United Kingdom
- Lithium ruthenate, an inorganic chemical compound with the formula Li_{2}RuO_{3}.
- Land Rover Owner, a magazine about Land Rover vehicles
- Left-to-right override, a Unicode character (U+202D) used in bi-directional text
- Legal Rights Observatory, a legal rights activism group
