= Anata =

Anata (あなた) is the Japanese word for "you".

Anata may refer to:

- Anata, a Japanese language second-person pronoun, sometimes used by married couples to refer to their partners
- Anata (band), a technical death metal band from Varberg, Sweden that formed in 1993
- 'Anata, a Palestinian town in the Jerusalem Governorate in the central West Bank
- Anata, a festivity celebrated since the early 1990s in the city of Oruro, Bolivia linked to pre-Hispanic agricultural practices
- "Anata" (song), a song by Utada Hikaru
- "Anata", a song by L'Arc-en-Ciel from their 1998 album Heart
- Anata (album), a 2026 album by Joshua Chuquimia Crampton

== See also ==
- Anatta, the Buddhist doctrine of "non-self"
