= Al Volante =

Monthly automobile magazine in Italy

- Categories: Automobile magazine
- Frequency: Monthly
- Publisher: Unimedia
- Founded: 1999; 27 years ago
- Country: Italy
- Based in: Milan
- Language: Italian
- Website: Al Volante

Al Volante is a monthly automobile magazine based in Milan, Italy. It has been in circulation since 1999.

== History and profile ==
Al Volante was established in 1999. The magazine is published by Unimedia on a monthly basis. The headquarters of the magazine is in Milan. It features articles on the estimations about second-hand cars as well as on auto reviews, road tests and price lists. Although its main focus is on automobiles, the magazine also covers articles related to motorcycles.

== Circulation ==
From September 2003 to August 2004 the circulation of Al Volante was 736,012 copies. In 2004 the magazine sold 720,000 copies. Between February 2006 and January 2007 its circulation was 566,800 copies. The magazine was the best-selling automobile magazine in Italy in 2007 with a circulation of 543,551 copies. In 2010 its circulation was 437,791 copies.

== See also ==
- List of magazines in Italy
