= Mary Sievier =

Mary Sievier (1941–2023) was a British woman who completed a round-the-world trip on a motorcycle. She did so in stages between 1967 (when she was 26 years old) and 1976, riding a BSA Bantam 175cc machine.

== Preparations ==
In the mid-1960s Mary Sievier was a shorthand reporter at a London magistrates court. In 2021 Mary Sievier told her story to Motorcycle Rider magazine:

The Daily Telegraph was running a holiday competition where you had to write about a trip. I'd already hitchhiked across Europe and through Tunisia and Libya but didn't want to do that again, and I certainly didn't want to cycle and didn't know how to drive a car, so decided on a motorbike. I would ride to the USSR, which was just starting to open to tourists. Two police motorcycle mechanics advised me to get a Bantam, because it was simple and light enough to load into a van if it broke down. CMW Motorcycles in Chichester) sold me a Bantam D7, taught me the basics of riding, and I was off.

However, there was a serious problem: the Russian authorities refused her a visa. She said that it was refused because the Russian authorities believed that seeing all 15,000 miles of the country by [motor-]bike would be too much for any woman. "That got my pride, so [I decided that] I would go to India on my bike and show people what distance really is."

She spent four months learning to ride and maintain her 175 cc motorcycle. "I did the RAC/ACU training scheme, which was fantastic. I had crashbars and legshields fitted, with panniers from Millets, (Note: A chain of shops selling outdoor clothing and equipment.) and wore a Helly Hansen sailing outfit which was waterproof, turned out to be accident proof and also very strong."

== Motorcycle ==
Sievier's motorcycle was a BSA D7 Super Bantam, index number JPX573D. The list price new was £129, but she bought it second hand for £99 10s. It is now an exhibit at the National Motor Museum, Beaulieu, in Hampshire.

She said, "The Bantam was brilliant, though it was serviced along the way and BSA helped by sending out parts."

== Journey as far as Kabul ==
In October 1967 Sievier set out on the journey with £80 in cash. She took secretarial jobs as she travelled in order to support herself.

She reported,

I remember catching the ferry in Portsmouth and staying with a friend in Paris, but the first day was awful. My red leather handbag fell off the back and was run over by a truck, then all the other luggage fell off as I was circulating the Arc de Triomphe, with a gendarme shouting at me. All I wanted to do was go home, and I had the wild idea of just getting a job in France and pretending to friends and family that I was still on the road. But there is such a thing as pride. Many people had said I would never manage it, so I was determined to carry on.

I think the RAC worked out a route for me, which got me through Eastern Europe and eventually to Istanbul. I knew I'd have to work, and an American family got me a job at the American military dependants' school. After six months I'd earned $600 – not enough to get to India, but it helped a lot. I wasn't able to ride through Lebanon and Syria because of fighting, so took a more northerly route to Tehran. I arrived at the British embassy at about 9pm and the official on duty said, 'Hello Mary, welcome to Tehran.' They were expecting me, and I don't really know how.

I kept going to Kabul. I'd been on the road nearly a year by now and had got over my travel nerves. I'd met other travellers and was determined to get to India. But again I had to work and earn some money, and ended up staying in Kabul for two years. Getting a job wasn't difficult though. Word got round that the English girl who had arrived on a motorbike wasn't a hippy smashed on hash, and I had three job offers. The social life in Kabul was fantastic—all the ex-pats wanted to meet the English girl on the bike.

== From Kabul to Hong Kong ==
I was always intending to get back on the road and eventually got to India. I'd been warned off travelling around the country by bike so put it in store for a bit while I travelled around. I had saved quite a lot of money by this time, and wanted to see the world, so [I] shipped the Bantam to Mombasa and went all through Kenya, Tanzania and Uganda, where Idi Amin had just come to power. Everyone said that I mustn't go to Uganda, that Amin is shooting people and kicking all the foreigners out—I thought I would be fine because I was only passing through, and I had no problems whatsoever.

There were some difficult moments though. Crossing Lake Kivu by boat, at one overnight stop ashore there was some sort of party going on – the captain locked me in his cabin and told me to keep my head down. In the Belgian Congo one mayor insisted I put the bike on a train rather than ride. 'There are people up in the hills,' he said, 'who don't know that we are no longer shooting white Belgians'. After Zambia and Rhodesia I got to South Africa where it was the apartheid era and not much fun, but the South Africans had been brought up with it and knew nothing else. I was warned not to ride through the Transkei as a white woman on her own but felt perfectly safe. I did run out of fuel once – a lot of white people drove past, but a black father and son stopped and syphoned some petrol from their own car to get me going.

From Durban Sievier shipped the bike on a cargo ship with three passengers to Melbourne. A motorcycle shop in Adelaide put sleeves inside the tyres, which helped on preventing punctures; she only sustained two on the entire world trip. When she got to the Nullarbor Plain, she expected it to be "hotter than hell", but in fact it was raining and so cold she had to put all her clothes on. There were filling stations every 200 miles.

She left Australasia in 1973, and continued to Singapore, Malaysia and Thailand, and then Laos. From there she once again took passage, to Hong Kong.

== Hong Kong to home ==
Sievier reached Hong Kong, and remained there for three years, incidentally meeting the man she was to marry, David Smith. She had no intention of riding any more, but he persuaded her to ship the bike to North America, cross the United States and ship it home. He argued that in her old age she would be able to say that she had ridden around the world on her Bantam. She did so, shipping the bike to Los Angeles then riding in a straight line eastwards to Savannah, Georgia.

In 1976 she gave an interview to the Long Beach Independent Press-Telegram newspaper. On the day of the interview her motorbike was located in a crate, and the docks where the authorities would not release it until she could produce proper identification. She had lost her original bill of lading, and had been waiting for four days for the shipping company to get a duplicate from their offices in Hong Kong. Meanwhile, she was staying at the Long Beach home of Betty and Carter Hoffman. She had met Mr Hoffman's brother in Afghanistan, and he gave her his relative's address.

== Epilogue ==
Sievier returned to the UK in 1976. She estimated that she had travelled around 50,000 miles. She said that she sustained two punctures on the journey.

She told a reporter, "The press at the time always had the same questions. How often was my money and passport stolen? And how often was I raped? None of that happened to me. Yes, there were situations, but I handled them. Having a posh English accent and being six-foot tall helped – men don't like being looked down on! Anyway, it got me to Savannah, was put in a crate and shipped to Harwich. My sister and I picked it up, took it to our mother's house in Selsey, Sussex, [and I] never rode it again until 2021.

On her return there was little media interest in her trip. The Daily Telegraph—the newspaper whose competition had inspired the trip in the first place—said that they had plenty of stories about people going round the world on motorcycles, and they did not want another one.

She had one fall, in North Australia, and landed "with my legs all twisted". She continued, and in New Zealand she stayed for ten months with a brother, before continuing to Singapore. In her journey she averaged about 250 miles a day; the most she ever travelled was 400 miles between Melbourne and Canberra, Australia. She said, "I was literally staggering by the end of my journey. Soon after I left England I slowly began discarding belongings: first the tent and sleeping bag went, followed by the typewriter. Now I'm down to two saddlebag—one for clothes and one for tools."

Her motorcycle sustained a breakdown in Australia, in the desert halfway between Perth and Darwin. She was without water; she was rescued by someone who came along in a Land Rover and helped her.

== Miscellaneous ==
Sievier was born in 1941, and on her marriage took the surname Smith; she died at the age of 82 in 2023.

Sievier was not the first woman to complete such a feat: Joy McKean of New Zealand had completed a round-the-world journey in the 1950s, on a similar motorcycle.

== Filmed interview and podcasts ==
In November 2021, Mary was interviewed by Martyn Moore and a film was made of this conversation. The full-length (1hr 19min) video includes photographs taken by Mary on her journey and press cuttings from local newspapers. A series of eight 25-minute podcasts was made, based on the whole interview. Available at https://shows.acast.com/mary-motorcycle
