= Road test =

Road test may refer to:

- Driving test, a test of driving skill typically needed for the receipt of a driving license
- Test drive, a trial run to assess handling or performance
