= Martyn Moore =

Martyn Moore is an English journalist, editor and film-maker.

He was born in 1961 at Norton-on-Derwent, near Malton, North Yorkshire and started work as a professional photographer in 1982. Moore travelled extensively as a photographer until 1988 when he joined the publishing company Emap as a feature writer for Practical Photography magazine.

In 1989 he was the PTC Trainee Journalist of the Year.

In 1991 Moore moved to Bike magazine as editor and was BSME Magazine Editor of the Year in 1992.

After Bike he started to work his way through Emap specialist magazines to become one of the company's most versatile editors, leading the editorial teams for, in chronological order:

Photo Answers, Practical Photography, Internet Magazine, Max Power, Max Power Online, Classic Cars magazine, Practical Classics, Fleet News

During his editorship of Classic Cars, Moore was also the resident classic car expert on BBC1's 20th Century Roadshow, presented by Alan Titchmarsh. In 2004 he was Emap Automotive's Editor of the Year.

Moore wrote his first book, The Photographer's Guide to Setting Up a Website in 2005. In 2008, he set up his own editorial services and media consultancy, NorthLight Media Ltd. NorthLight's first project was a regional business-to-business news website, Peterboroughbusiness.co.uk

In 2009 NorthLight Media launched Business Education News, a quarterly publication aimed at businesses supporting further and higher education initiatives. Also in 2009, Martyn Moore was appointed editor of BPI, the magazine for the British photographic industry.

He used to lecture in journalism and digital communications at Peterborough Regional College.

Since 2011 Martyn Moore has concentrated on film-making, producing short films mostly for online viewing. His second book, You Can Be A Film-maker, was published in April 2017.
