= Gruzovik Press =

Russian automotive publication

- Editor: Alexander Eremtsov
- Categories: Automobile magazine
- Frequency: Monthly
- Circulation: 40,000 /monthly
- Founded: 2003
- Company: Advertising and Information Agency "Rossbiznes"
- Country: Russia
- Language: Russian
- Website: http://www.gruzovikpress.ru/
- ISSN: 1810-3170

Gruzovik Press, a Russian automotive publication, is a monthly publication on trucks, buses and military vehicles. Of Russian publications on this topic, it is aimed at not only professionals but also for ordinary fans of this technology, where particularly unique materials are published on the history of the samples of this technique, written by experts in the field, materials for car models and is also commercially available.

It is the only magazine in Russia on this subject which conducts a full-scale coverage of test tool technology on various vehicle technologies.

"Gruzovik Press" regularly participates in thematic exhibitions.

The magazine has been published since 2003. In 2014, it launched the electronic version of the magazine for IPad.
