= Heritage Commercials =

British Vintage Vehicle Magazine

Heritage Commercials is a British magazine for classic and vintage commercial vehicle enthusiasts. It has been published on a monthly basis since 1987. The magazine was part of Mortons Media Group until 2016 when it was acquired by Kelsey Media. David Craggs and Stephen Pullen served as the editors of the magazine when it was part of Mortons Media Group.

The magazine typically contains historical information as well as coverage of vehicle preservation efforts.
