= Coast (magazine) =

British Coast magazine

Coast Magazine
- Editor: Alex Fisher
- Categories: Lifestyle
- Frequency: Monthly (12 issues a year)
- First issue: March/April 2004
- Company: Kelsey Media
- Country: United Kingdom
- Based in: Kent
- Website: coastmagazine.co.uk
- ISSN: 1742-5840

Coast is a consumer magazine about the British seaside. It was launched as a bi-monthly title in 2004 by Coastal Living Ltd, and was then published by Edisea Ltd, until UK publishing company National Magazines (now Hearst Communications) bought it in 2005. National Magazines continued to publish it bi-monthly as a sister title to Country Living magazine. It increased the number of issues published per year to ten in 2007. The magazine was taken over by current publishers Kelsey Media in November 2012. The number of issues published per year was increased to twelve in 2014. Coast covers all aspects of living by the sea: homes, gardens, travel, food and health. The magazine was formerly headquartered in London. It is now based in Kent.

== The Coast Awards ==
Every year, the magazine celebrates the best of the British coastline in the Coast Awards. The winners of each of the ten categories are usually announced in the June issue of the magazine. From 2008 to 2011, the Awards have been reader nominated and a panel of expert judges has decided on the winners from a short list. Past presenters of the Coast Awards ceremony have included Michaela Strachan and Julia Bradbury.

== Campaigns ==
In 2009, Coast launched a Save the Seaside Postcard campaign that attracted widespread media attention including an appearance by editor Clare Gogerty on the Today programme on Radio 4, and on BBC Breakfast.

In the Great Seaside Poster Revival (June 2010), seven artists (Rob Ryan, Angie Lewin, Barbara Hulanicki, Nick Higgins, Wayne and Gerardine Hemingway, Andy Tuohy and Christopher Wormell) were asked to reinvent the seaside poster to publicise a chosen resort. The original artwork of each of these posters was auctioned on eBay with funds raised (£5,000) going to the Marine Conservation Society. Readers also submitted their own designs in a related competition.

In March 2011, Coast launched the Great Pier Promenade to raise funds towards the restoration of Hastings Pier,Roberts, Anna (13 October 2011). "Woman's challenge in aid of fire struck Hastings Pier". The Argus. which was damaged by fire in October 2010. The magazine called upon readers to walk as many UK pleasure piers as possible during spring/summer 2011, and to get themselves sponsored.

== Reader events ==
Coast holds an annual beach clean in collaboration with the Marine Conservation Society. Beaches cleaned so far include Southwold, East Wittering, Holkham and Weston-super-Mare (May 2011). Further events included an annual coastal walk, a reader Learn to Sail Day, and a day out at the De La Warr Pavilion.

== Competitions ==
Competitions are an annual photographic competition (results announced in the March issue), and a Coast Quilt competition held in association with Runaway Coast.

== Awards ==
Coast won Best Specialist Consumer Magazine at the PPA Awards in 2009.

== Editors ==
- Jo Denbury (issues 1–5)
- Katie Ebben (issues 6–10)
- Susy Smith (issues 10–19)
- Clare Gogerty (issues 20 to 73)
- Emma Dublin (issues 74 to 79)
- Alex Fisher (issues 80 to present)
