= David Arculus =

British media figure, businessman (born 1946)

Sir David Arculus
- Born: Thomas David Guy Arculus; 2 June 1946 (age 80)
- Education: Oriel College, University of Oxford and the London Business School
- Occupation: High Sheriff of Cambridgeshire (2016–2017)

Sir Thomas David Guy Arculus (born 2 June 1946), is a British media figure, businessman and advisor to Government who has appeared several times in The Sunday Times Power 100, ranked at number 39 in 2005.

== Education ==
Educated at Bromsgrove School (Wendron House) and Oriel College, University of Oxford and the London Business School, he started his career as a writer and was a producer for the BBC from 1968 to 1974. He joined EMAP in 1972, and took it from being a small regional newspaper publisher to a large media group. He was involved in launching many new magazines – for instance, Smash Hits, a journal that printed words to pop songs, which went from an initial circulation of 10,000 to one million within a year, which provided the cash which helped Emap to subsequently become a leader in the world of business communications encompassing magazines, events, exhibitions and data products.

== Career ==
As a result of these successes Arculus worked his way up to group managing director in 1989, leaving Emap in 1997. He subsequently became chief operating officer of United News and Media and then became chairman of IPC Media which at the time was Britain's largest management buy-out. Arculus also headed Earls Court and Olympia Ltd and spent nearly ten years as a Non-Executive Director of Pearson plc.

Away from the media sector, he was a Non-Executive Director of Severn Trent plc from 1996, serving as chairman from 1998 until 2004.

He joined the board of O2 plc in 2003, and in 2006 as chairman was responsible with the management team for the sale of O2 to Telefónica of Spain. At £18bn this was the largest cash deal ever done in Europe, and the second biggest in the world. Following the 2006 merger of O2 and Telefónica he sat on the Board of Telefónica. David has also served as a director of Barclays and Pearson and of a variety of private equity backed companies and was chairman of ExCeL Exhibition Centre.

During his career David has also undertaken a number of non-business roles, including four years (2002 to 2006) as Tony Blair's "Red Tape Czar" when he was chairman of the British Government's Better Regulation Task Force. During this time he helped bring about a number of regulatory initiatives intended to reduce burdens on business. These included improved impact assessments; the introduction of common commencement dates and the measurement of administrative burden in the UK economy which led to government imposing a 25% red tape reduction across all departments. He also led the effort during the UK Presidency to reduce EU bureaucratic burdens which resulted in the notable claim from MEPs that "the European Parliament now has nothing to do".

Arculus has also been a member of the National Consumer Council and chaired both the Royal Institution and the Advisory Council of The British Library as well as being a trustee of various charitable organisations. In 2014, Arculus was appointed as the chairman of Hassium Asset Management, a wealth management firm servicing high net worth clients, run by Yogesh "Yogi" Dewan.

Alongside his role as High Sheriff of Cambridgeshire 2016–2017, David is currently the chairman of Energy UK.
