= Clive Matthew-Wilson =

New Zealand writer

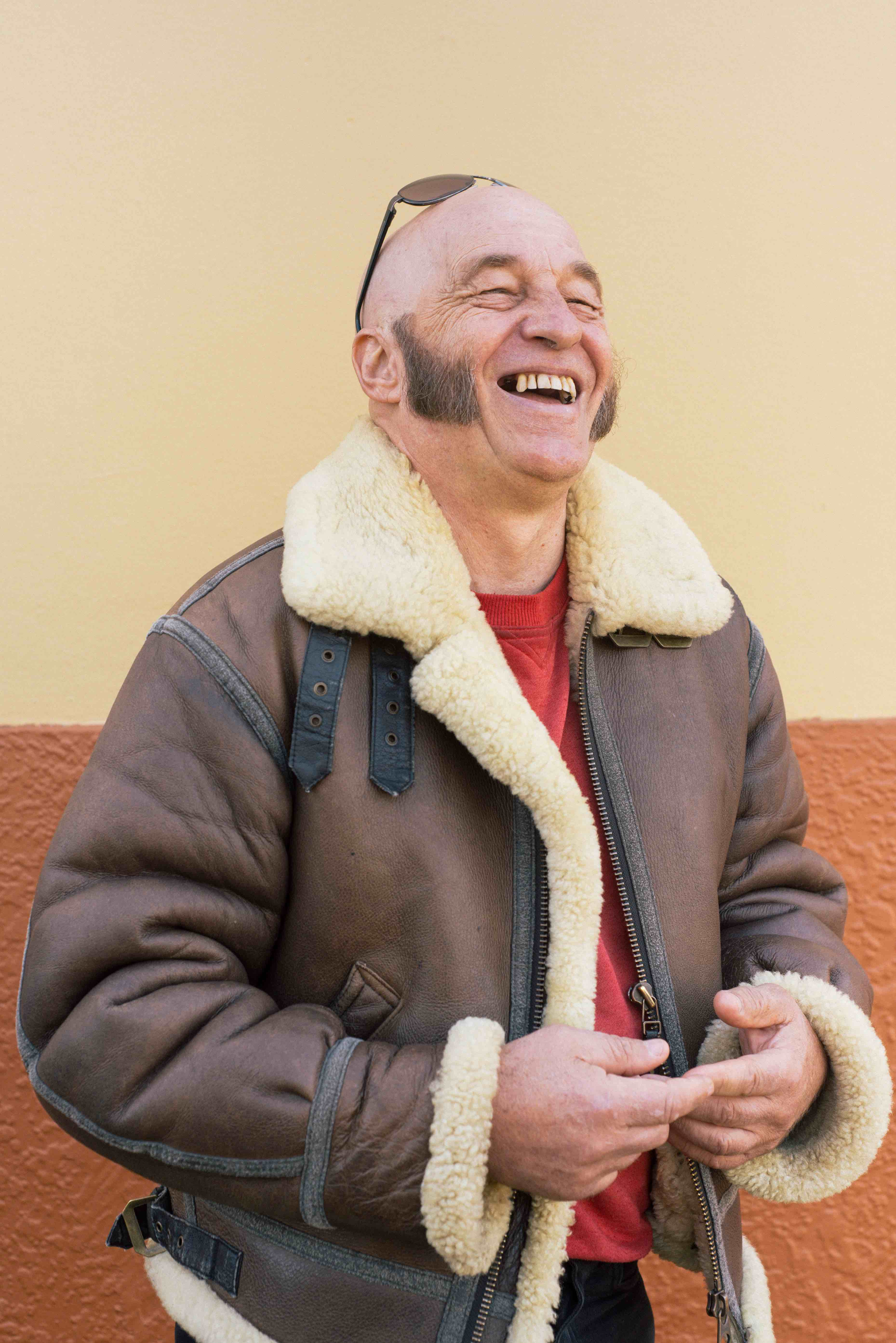
- Clive Matthew-Wilson
- Born: 24 July 1956 (age 70)
- Occupations: Author, songwriter
- Writing career
- Genre: Non-fiction
- Website: www.dogandlemon.com

Clive Matthew-Wilson (born 24 July 1956 in Wellington) is a New Zealand writer.

He was educated at exclusive private school Scots College, and Wellington College. Matthew-Wilson left school at 15. After several years traveling, he became a motor mechanic. He ended up running his own garage for six years, before experimenting with a number of careers, including prestidigitation, advertising, songwriting, jewellery, computers, publishing and public relations. He eventually became a professional writer, whose published works include The Information Effect, The Turners & Growers Natural Foods Cookbook & The Dog & Lemon Guide. Matthew-Wilson is concerned about fatal police chases.
