= Violation out-of-service =

Form of driving violation

The purpose of out-of-service criteria is to define a set of physical conditions under which a commercial motor vehicle ("CMV") or commercial driver may be placed out of service. The Secretary of Transportation’s statutory authority for issuing out-of-service orders is predicated upon a finding that a regulatory violation poses an imminent hazard to public safety.

The out-of-service criteria should establish binding norms for use by vehicle safety inspectors, and other law enforcement officials, to define certain conditions that pose an imminent hazard to safety and permit the inspector to order the driver and/or his CMV out of service. For enforcement of those norms, research has shown that truck "drivers rely heavily on evaluations of safety norms (and not reward/punishment outcomes) when forming ethical judgments and behavioral intentions."

An out of service violation removes the driver and CMV off the roadway until the violation is corrected, and can result in, with repeated violations, up to three years' suspended license.

== See also ==
- No fault insurance
- Highway safety
