= Practical Reptile Keeping =

British herpetology magazine

- Cover of the February 2010 issue.
- Editor: David Alderton
- Categories: Herpetology
- Frequency: Monthly
- Founded: 2009
- Company: Kelsey Media
- Country: United Kingdom
- Language: English
- Website: www.practicalreptilekeeping.co.uk

Practical Reptile Keeping is a monthly herpetology magazine published by Kelsey Media in the United Kingdom. The magazine focuses on all aspects of Reptilekeeping, including Species information and Caresheets.

The magazine was first released in 2009 and is funded by Ad revenue from Reptile stores and websites.
