= Triathlon Plus =

- Categories: Sports
- Frequency: Monthly
- Founded: 2009
- Company: Kelsey Media
- Country: United Kingdom
- Based in: Cudham
- Language: English
- Website: www.triradar.com/triathlon-features/magazine/
- ISSN: 1759-7838

Triathlon Plus is a monthly triathlon magazine published in the UK by Kelsey Media. Launched in May 2009 by Future plc, it contains news, features, coaching tips and buyers guides. According to the magazine's web site, the editor (as of March 2010) is Elizabeth Hufton. However, the pre-launch news story in The Guardian said that the editor would be "Mat Brett, former editor of Mountain Biking UK and Cycling Plus". In 2014, Future sold its auto titles and Triathlon Plus to Kelsey Media.
