= Internet Magazine =

Defunct British technology magazine (1994–2004)

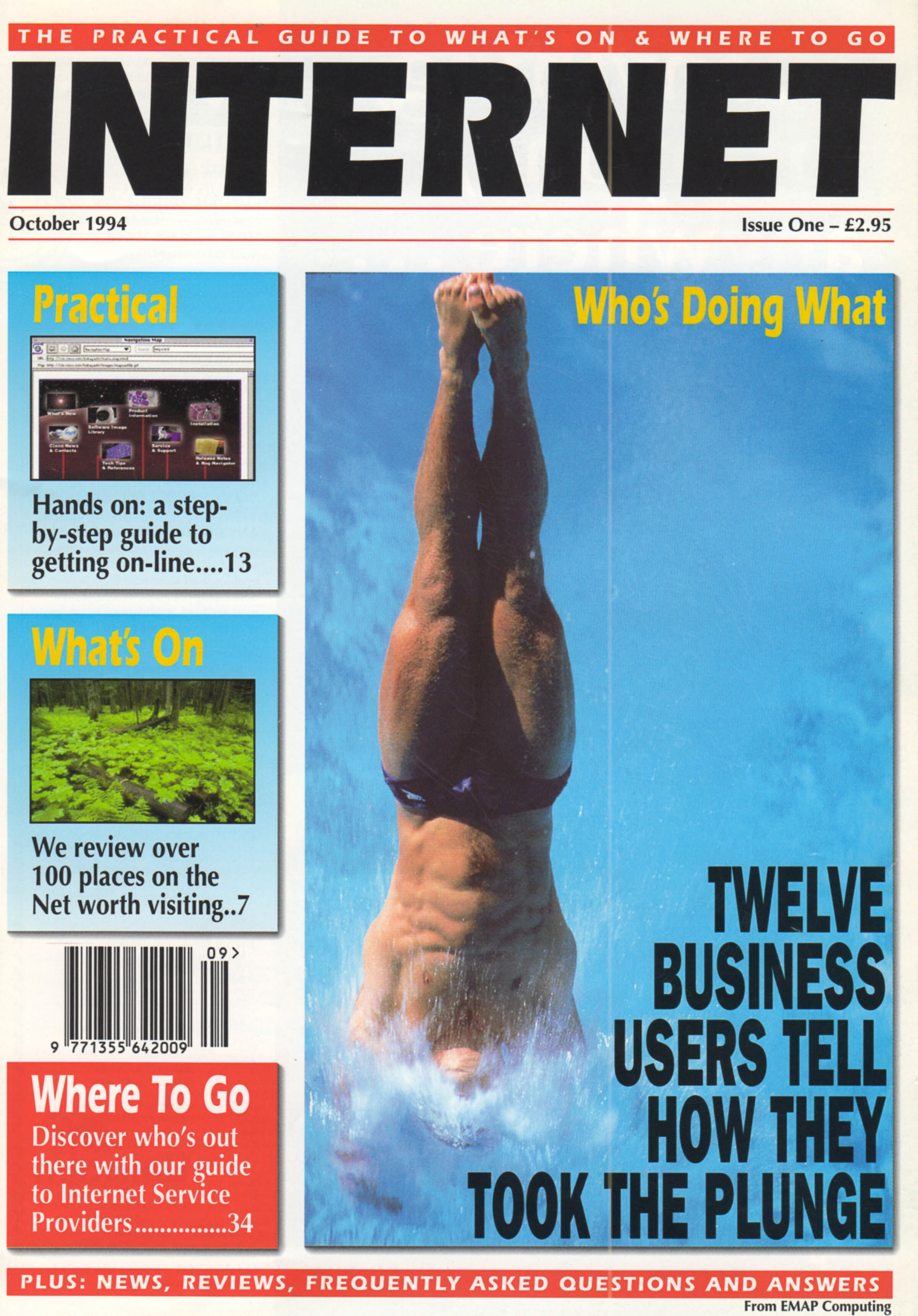
- The first edition of Internet Magazine
- Categories: Computer magazines
- Frequency: Monthly
- First issue: October 1994
- Final issue Number: July 2004; 119
- Company: Emap
- Country: United Kingdom
- Based in: London
- Language: English
- ISSN: 1355-6428

Internet Magazine was a monthly print title launched in October 1994 by the UK publishing house, Emap. Its last issue, number 119, was published in July 2004.

== History ==
Internet Magazine covered almost anything internet-related, as long as there was a consumer or small business slant. It was launched by Emap's London-based Emap Computing unit as a spin-off from a now-defunct technical computer networking monthly called Datacom having been proposed by that magazine's then deputy editor Neil Ellul to publisher Roger Green.

The first stand-alone issue of Internet, edited by Ellul and published by Green appeared in October 1994 with a cover story on how a dozen businesses had 'taken the plunge' by starting up their own websites.

Positioned as 'the practical guide to what's on and where to go', Internet Magazine published a list of all the world's publicly available World Wide Web websites—55 in the first issue of the magazine—as well as content available through FTP and Gopher protocols.

Gradually, the dot-com boom helped boost the magazine's popularity, and by the late 1990s its pagination had quadrupled from 52 pages to more than 200.

Regular features included "Bookmarks of the Rich and Famous", in which a celebrity was asked their favourite websites. Featured celebrities of the day included Uri Geller, Kelly Brook, Loyd Grossman, Terry Pratchett, Steve Redgrave and Martine McCutcheon.

In 2000, Internet Magazine began hosting a regular 'Movers and Shakers' event which featured 50 of what it deemed the biggest names in the Internet industry. The first event included guests such as Bob Geldof, who had established an internet travel website called Deckchair.com (now part of lastminute.com), as well as lastminute.com's founders, Brent Hoberman and Martha Lane Fox. The last annual Movers and Shakers event was held in 2003.

== Layout and content ==
From 1998 onwards, the magazine was divided into several sections including news, an internet interview, expert help, features and website reviews.

Its accompanying website, www.internet-magazine.com, was launched in 2001, and included daily news, a website of the week and several feature articles.

In 2003, a decision was made to redesign the magazine. A new masthead and font was introduced, and a more conscious decision to make the column layout more flexible.

== Contributors ==
Regular contributors to the magazine included Angus Kennedy, author of the first few editions of the Rough Guide to the Internet (which initially was largely based on content that had appeared in Internet Magazine); Simon Waldman, now Director, Product Research, Design and Definition at Sky; Lance Concannon; Bill Thompson; Mike Slocombe, founder of the Brixton-based website Urban 75; Sean McManus; Ivan Pope, internet publisher and inventor of the Cybercafe; Richard Dinnick, author and screenwriter; Martyn Moore, writer and filmmaker; and Daniel Harvey, journalist and publisher of Transport Briefing.
