= Commercial vehicle =

Road vehicle designed to transport persons or goods for compensation

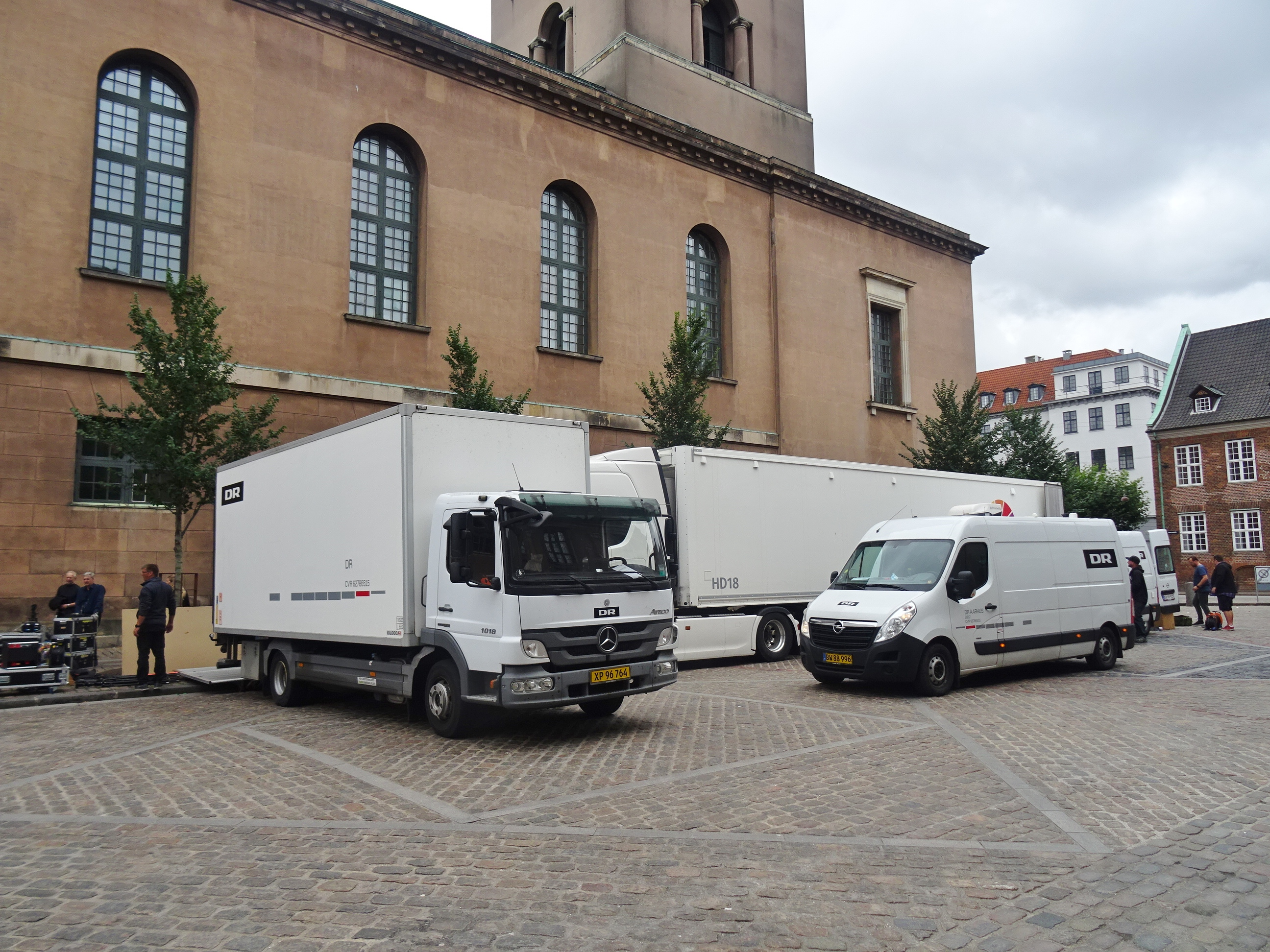
Trucks and vans, two types of vehicles common as commercial vehicles, operated by DR in Copenhagen, Denmark

A commercial vehicle is any type of motor vehicle used for transporting goods or paying passengers. Depending on laws and designations, a commercial vehicle can be any broad type of motor vehicle used commercially or for business purposes.

== Classification ==
In the United States, a vehicle is designated "commercial" when it is titled or registered to a company. This is a broad definition, as commercial vehicles may be fleet vehicles, company cars, or other vehicles used for business. Vehicles that are designed to carry more than 15 passengers are considered a commercial vehicle. Variations may exist from state-to-state on which "commercial vehicles" are prohibited on certain routes and lanes and between homeowner associations, which may employ broader definitions than their municipalities with regard to their own parking restrictions.

Broadly defined, a vehicle may be considered a commercial vehicle if it:

- Belongs to a company or corporation
- Is used for business, but is in an individual's name, such as a sole proprietor
- Is a leased vehicle and in the name of the financial institution that owns it
- Exceeds a certain weight or class and therefore, is "classified" as commercial even though it may not be commercially used or commercially owned; a weight rating of 26,001 pounds or more is always considered commercial
- Is used to haul any hazardous material

A vehicle can be used for a business, if not exclusively, and remain privately licensed, depending on the amount of time used for business.

=== Legal definitions ===
In the United States, the Federal Motor Carrier Safety Administration defines a "commercial motor vehicle" as any self-propelled or towed vehicle used on a public highway in interstate commerce to transport passengers or property when the vehicle:

1. Has a gross vehicle weight rating of 4,536 kg (10,001 pounds) or more
2. Is designed or used to transport more than 8 passengers (including the driver) for compensation;
3. Is designed or used to transport more than 15 passengers, including the driver, not used to transport passengers for compensation;
4. Is used in transporting material found by the Secretary of Transportation to be hazardous.

The federal definition, though followed closely, is meant to accommodate and remain flexible to each state's definitions.

The European Union defines a "commercial motor vehicle" as any motorized road vehicle, that by its type of construction and equipment is designed for, and capable of transporting, whether for payment or not:

1. More than nine persons, including the driver;
2. Goods and "standard fuel tanks". This means the tanks permanently fixed by the manufacturer to all motor vehicles of the same type as the vehicle in question and whose permanent fitting lets fuel be used directly, both for propulsion and, where appropriate, to power a refrigeration system. Gas tanks fitted to motor vehicles for the direct use of diesel as a fuel are considered standard fuel tanks.

=== Commercial truck classification ===
Commercial trucks are classified according to the gross vehicle weight rating (GVWR). The United States Department of Transportation classifies commercial trucks with eight classes:

- Class 1 – GVWR ranges from 0 to 6,000 pounds (0 to 2,722 kg)
- Class 2 – GVWR ranges from 6,001 to 10,000 pounds (2,722 to 4,536 kg)
- Class 3 – GVWR ranges from 10,001 to 14,000 pounds (4,536 to 6,350 kg)
- Class 4 – GVWR ranges from 14,001 to 16,000 pounds (6,351 to 7,257 kg)
- Class 5 – GVWR ranges from 16,001 to 19,500 pounds (7,258 to 8,845 kg)
- Class 6 – GVWR ranges from 19,501 to 26,000 pounds (8,846 to 11,793 kg)
- Class 7 – GVWR ranges from 26,001 to 33,000 pounds (11,794 to 14,969 kg)
- Class 8 – GVWR is anything above 33,000 pounds (14,969 kg)

== Examples of commercial vehicles ==
- Truck
  - Box truck
  - Farm truck
  - Mini truck
  - Pickup truck
  - Semi-trailer truck
  - Tow truck
- Van
  - Light commercial vehicle
  - Panel van
- Bus
  - Coach
- Trailers
  - Caravan over 10,000 pounds
- Heavy equipment (in mining equipment, construction equipment, farming machinery)
- Taxi
  - Share taxi
- Auto rickshaw
- Motorcycle taxi

Commercial vehicles are sometimes sought after for historic preservation as classic cars. News about preservation can be found in magazines such as Hemmings Motor News and Heritage Commercials.

== Legal issues ==
Commercial vehicle accidents and injuries are often more complex than regular car accidents, often involving additional concerns, background checks on operator driving records, and corporate maintenance records.

== See also ==
- Bus driver
- Commercial vehicle inspection
- Light commercial vehicle
- Large goods vehicle
- Light truck
- Truck classification
- Truck driver
- Utility vehicle
- Violation out-of-service
