= Anata (album) =

Studio album by Joshua Chuquimia Crampton
- Released: February 4, 2026
- Genre: Experimental
- Length: 24:55
- Producer: Joshua Chuquimia Crampton

Joshua Chuquimia Crampton chronology
Los Thuthanaka (2025)	Anata (2026)	Wak'a (2026)

Singles from Anata
- 1. "Ch'uwanchaña ~El Golpe Final~" Released: January 21, 2026

Anata is the fifth studio album by the American experimental musician Joshua Chuquimia Crampton. Released on February 4, 2026, the album was initially self-issued on Bandcamp and later made available on other streaming platforms on February 26. The album takes its title from the Anata ceremony, an Aymara tradition associated with offerings to Pachamama, reflecting the principle of ayni (reciprocity between humans and nature).

Musically, critics have categorized the instrumental album as an experimental record with elements of psychedelic music, shoegaze and Andean folk, incorporating regional instruments such as the charango, ronroco, and bombo italaque drum alongside electric guitar-based arrangements. Its production emphasizes high volume, distortion, and an intentionally unmastered sound, with compositions structured around repetitive motifs and contrasting textures. The lead single, "Ch'uwanchaña ~El Golpe Final~", was released on January 21, 2026. Music critics lauded Anata for Crampton's guitar sound and its raw, high-volume sound.

== Background and production ==
On March 22, 2025, Joshua Chuquimia Crampton and his sibling Chuquimamani-Condori surprise-released a self-titled collaborative album under the name Los Thuthanaka, available exclusively on Bandcamp. The album blends elements of traditional Andean genres linked with the duo's Aymara heritage, such as huayno, caporal, and kullawada, with experimental electronic music. The album was released to critical acclaim from music publications; Pitchfork named it the best album of 2025, The Wire placed it third on its year-end list, and Resident Advisor included it among the top electronic releases of the 21st century, placing it tenth.

Anata takes its title from the Anata ceremony, an Aymara tradition in which offerings are made to Pachamama prior to the rainy season, reflecting the principle of ayni, or reciprocity between humans and nature. Crampton intended the record to capture the energy of "activated ceremonial music" rather than a polished studio version of traditional sounds, informed by his affiliation with the Great Pakajaqi Nation. To achieve this, he utilized a production style meant to resemble a ceremony captured on a phone camera, characterized by clipped audio and distortion. Anata is presented as deliberately unmastered, emphasizing high volume levels, clipped audio, and distorted textures. The sound is shaped through extensive use of equalization, alongside layered guitar parts that are combined to produce both unified and multilayered textures. Performance technique contributes to the tonal variation. The arrangements incorporate repeated figures and loops, with some passages transitioning between contrasting textures through studio manipulation.

== Musical style ==
=== Overview ===
Anata is an instrumental album. Daniel Bromfield of Pitchfork has categorized Anata as an experimental recording, with other critics noting its elements of modern psychedelic music, shoegaze and Andean folk. At the time of its release, it was Crampton's shortest solo album, consisting of seven dense instrumental tracks with a runtime of 25 minutes. The album is built around electric guitar and bass guitar, complemented by regional Andean instruments such as the charango, ronroco, and bombo italaque. Structurally, the compositions often rely on repetitive, trance-like motifs and fluid arrangements that move between heavily distorted passages and more subdued, atmospheric sections.

=== Songs ===
"Ch'uwanchaña ~El Golpe Final~"
A sample of the third track and lead single, "Ch'uwanchaña ~El Golpe Final~", which introduces Crampton's distinctive guitar performance.

Opening the album, "Chakana Head-Bang!" starts with a muffled, low-frequency drum pattern that develops into a jagged guitar riff marked by increasing speed and amplitude. The track incorporates dense guitar feedback and emphasizes the interaction between contrasting low- and high-frequency elements. "Taqini (Juntxs)" is characterized by a relatively bright melodic framework subjected to light distortion. Its rhythm maintains a restrained but energetic quality, accompanying a guitar performance that includes high-pitched tones. The composition returns to its opening motif in a more subdued and reflective form. "Ch'uwanchaña ~El Golpe Final~" foregrounds rhythmic drive, combining distorted guitar textures with looping structures. The arrangement juxtaposes heavy metal-influenced guitar passages with acoustic timbres from charango and ronroco, and features a deliberately diffuse structural progression.

"Convocación -Banger/Diffusion-" is divided into two sections, with an initial segment built around dense, swirling guitar textures followed by a quieter ambient passage. The latter employs reversed guitar loops to produce a softened, modulated tonal effect. "Mallku Diablón" combines freeform instrumental passages with a huayno-derived rhythmic pattern. The arrangement is reinforced by the use of the bombo italaque drum, which is comparatively more accessible in tone than other compositions on the album. "Jallu" begins with tremolo-based ambient textures before shifting to a more forceful, rhythmically driven guitar passage. The track's dynamics are shaped primarily by variations in strumming intensity, and it concludes with a brief coda following a sudden pause. The title track, "Anata", opens with abrasive noise elements and gradually develops into a layered instrumental composition. A repeated charango figure provides a consistent tonal counterpoint to the surrounding guitar textures, and the track closes with a gradual reduction in intensity.

== Release ==
Anata was self-released by Joshua Chuquimia Crampton on February 4, 2026, two days ahead of its scheduled release date of February 6. It was issued exclusively through the Bandcamp platform, before becoming available on other streaming platforms on February 26. The lead single, "Ch'uwanchaña ~El Golpe Final~", was released on January 21, 2026, alongside the album's announcement. An album release event was held on February 6, 2026, in San Francisco. The event was organized as a community gathering and hosted by the Bay Area American Indian Two-Spirits (BAAITS) and the Sacramento Red Road Gathering. It included a screening of Amaru’s Tongue: Daughter (2021), a collaborative film by Crampton and Chuquimamani-Condori.

== Critical reception ==
Professional ratings
Review scores
Source	Rating
The Guardian	4/5 stars
Our Culture Mag	4/5 stars
Paste	A−
Pitchfork	7.6/10

Daniel Bromfield from Pitchfork portrays Anata as "some of the most elemental, in-the-red music ever recorded", and an "anti-colonial, anti-complacency guitar album", praising its raw texture and emphasis on performance. In a piece for Stereogum, Tom Breihan wrote that, as with his work in Los Thuthanaka, the record draws on similar influences, adding that listeners can "get lost in this music". Jaša Bužinel of The Quietus remarked on the difficulty of describing Crampton's work in conventional terms, suggesting that it invites "mystical" interpretations while ultimately functioning as "emotional guitar music with a singular atmosphere". He described the album as a "spiritual successor" to Los Thuthanaka's self-titled release, characterizing the listening experience as akin to a "purifying noise bath".

Writing for The Guardian, Safi Bugel described Anata as "an ear-splitting haze that heals as it hurts", calling it a "scrappy sonic meditation" with "woozy melodies and pockets of warmth". Paste's Matt Mitchell described Anata as "a ceremony of noise", calling it "an abundant, truthful body of work" that "merits repeated listens", while emphasizing its physical intensity and focus on loudness as an embodied experience. In a review for Our Culture Mag, Konstantinos Pappis praised Anata as a "fantastic new album" described it as initially "harsh to the point of being overstimulating", though he argued that, with context, its "spiritual, medicinal, and strikingly deconstructive properties" become more apparent. Andrew Sacher of BrooklynVegan highlighted the record's hypnotic guitar work, writing that they "are impossible to not get sucked into".

== Track listing ==
All tracks are written by Joshua Chuquimia Crampton.

Amata track listing
No.	Title	Length
1.	"Chakana Head-Bang!"	3:11
2.	"Taqini (Juntxs)"	2:35
3.	"Ch'uwanchaña ~El Golpe Final~"	4:05
4.	"Convocación -Banger/Diffusion-"	3:59
5.	"Mallku Diablón"	4:30
6.	"Jallu"	3:23
7.	"Anata"	3:10
Total length:		24:55

== Personnel ==
Credits are adapted from Tidal and Bandcamp.

- Joshua Chuquimia Crampton – production, recording, electric guitar (all tracks); bass (track 5), charango (3, 5, 7), ronroco (3, 5), bombo italaque (1, 2, 5)
