= The Dog & Lemon Guide =

The Dog & Lemon Guide is an annual car buyer's guide originally based in Auckland, New Zealand, sold throughout British commonwealth countries and beyond. It was one of the few widely available publications that rank the reliability of cars sold in Australia. It was founded by mechanic and writer, Clive Matthew-Wilson. At over 1000 pages, it is claimed to be the largest car buyer's guide on the planet. It was first published in 1996 and last published as a book in 2010.

The guide lists common faults and safety ratings for several thousand different vehicles. The term dog and the term lemon are generic terms for bad cars in many countries. Unusually for a motoring publication, The Dog & Lemon Guide tends to avoid the petrolhead point of view and focuses instead on the motoring experiences of "ordinary" people. The Dog & Lemon Guide is also unusual in that it uses wit and sarcasm as a primary vehicle for communication. The guide refuses to accept car company advertising and is widely seen as a threat by both the motor industry and much of the mainstream motoring press.

The book has come under fire from many car enthusiasts in its home market of New Zealand, with many bringing into question the accuracy of the information provided in the book and Matthew-Wilson's bias towards Japanese makers for reliability claims – praising Toyota in particular – against Australian and European cars.

One may also suggest that using customer satisfaction surveys as a means of determining reliability is flawed. The results of customer satisfaction surveys are influenced by owner expectations and how well the manufacturer responds to a fault. However, The Dog & Lemon Guide claims to also make extensive use of surveys where only the reliability of the vehicle is looked at. For example, the low level of customer satisfaction for Peugeot cars is matched by the low levels of reliability for Peugeot cars. Peugeot cars also have far higher levels of breakdowns than similar Japanese vehicles, and these breakdowns are logged by the mechanic who is sent out to rescue the stranded vehicle, not the owner, so they cannot be said to be subjective.

Other critics have questioned the way the guide tends to lump all European makes into one bad basket, pointing out that makes such as Skoda, Porsche, and Jaguar have far better reliability records than makes like Peugeot and Renault. European cars have values unseen in Japanese makes that go beyond mere reliability.

For readers used to the glossy magazine advertising of expensive cars, it is a very revealing publication in that it cans/questions the safety and reliability of some of the more famous car makers in the world. The introductory articles on some of the car makers and their companies read like summaries of good opera plots.

The Dog & Lemon Guide created controversy by publishing articles like Cars and other dysfunctional relationships by feminist writer Germaine Greer, which included the line: "men abuse cars because they cannot separate the idea of abuse from the concept of love." In another controversial article: Cars & Nazis, the guide alleged that the US car industry actively supported Hitler and knowingly gave the Germans the technology to launch World War II.

The Dog & Lemon Guide's website contains the only English language translation of the entire Japanese domestic car safety recalls database. This information is provided free of charge and is widely used to investigate possible safety faults on Japanese vehicles imported second-hand from Japan. This information is frequently used by buyers of grey market vehicles, who often have no other way of telling if their second-hand vehicles have been subject to unresolved recalls before export.
