= Kelsey Media =

British magazine publishing company

Kelsey Media Ltd
- Industry: Publishing
- Founded: 1989
- Headquarters: Yalding, England
- Revenue: £25 million (2018)
- Operating income: £4.9 million (2018)
- Website: www.kelsey.co.uk

Kelsey Media Ltd is a magazine publisher and trade fair company based in Yalding, England. Founded in 1989, it has bought and sold many publications over the years, including former Bauer Media Group magazines Sea Angler, Car Mechanics and Your Horse (which it bought from Bauer along with their websites) in July 2020. In May 2023, it bought the print and digital assets of Uncut magazine from BandLab Technologies' NME Networks division, with the first issue of Uncut published by Kelsey Media being the September 2023 issue Take 317.

Kelsey Media has published the following magazines:

- Aeroplane
- Agricultural Trader
- 220 Triathlon
- Amateur Gardening
- Amateur Photographer
- Aston Martin Driver
- Boxing News
- Cage & Aviary Birds
- Car Mechanics (previously published by Bauer)
- Camper & Bus
- Canal Boat
- Classic & Vintage Commercials
- Classic Car Buyer
- Classic Car Mart
- Classic Ford
- Classic Massey & Ferguson
- Classic Military Vehicles
- Classic Plant & Machinery
- Classic Truck
- Classic Van & pick-up
- Classics Monthly
- ClayCraft
- Coast
- Country Kitchen
- Country Smallholding
- Custom Car
- Fast Car
- Fast Ford
- Fishing News
- Ford & Fordson Tractors
- Good Homes
- Heritage Commercials
- Holiday Living
- Jaguar World
- Jets Monthly
- Land Rover World
- Match
- Men's Fitness
- MG Enthusiast
- Mini
- MiniWorld
- Modern Mini
- Motorsport News
- On the Buses
- Outdoor Fitness
- Park Home & Holiday Caravan
- Performance Audi
- Performance BMW
- Performance Vauxhall
- Performance VW
- Pick Up
- Pilot
- Practical Pigs
- Practical Poultry
- Practical Reptile Keeping
- Profi International
- Psychologies
- Rail Express
- Retro Cars
- Rolls Royce & Bentley Driver
- Running Fitness
- SciFiNow
- Sea Angler (previously published by Bauer)
- Ships Monthly
- Slim, Fit & Healthy
- South East Farmer
- Stationary Engine
- Stuff
- The Christmas Magazine
- The Great Outdoors
- The Tillergraph
- Top Santé
- Tractor & Farming Heritage
- Tractor & Machinery
- Tractor World
- Transport Cafe
- Triathlon Plus
- Triumph World
- Trucking
- Uncut
- Vintage Roadscene
- Volkswagen Golf+
- VolksWorld
- VWt
- World Soccer
- Wrights Farming Register
- Your Chickens
- Your Horse (previously published by Bauer)
- 4×4
- 911 & Porsche World
