= ICar (magazine) =

British automobile magazine

iCar
- Launch issue cover
- Editor: Jeremy Laird
- Categories: Automobile magazine
- Frequency: Quarterly
- Publisher: Future plc
- First issue: May 2011
- Final issue Number: August 2011; 2
- Country: United Kingdom
- Language: English
- OCLC: 751737378

iCar was a British automobile magazine published by Future.

It was launched in May 2011 as a quarterly car magazine, edited by Jeremy Laird.

The magazine's aim was to cover more sustainable cars. It was very short-lived, with only two issues being published before being closed in August 2011.
