= Fast Car (magazine) =

UK-based car magazine

- Cover of the final issue (438, Winter 2021)
- Editor: Jules Truss
- Categories: Automobile magazine
- Frequency: Monthly (13 per year)
- Circulation: 60,000
- Publisher: Phil Weeden
- First issue: April 1987
- Final issue Number: October 2021; 438
- Company: Kelsey Media
- Country: United Kingdom
- Language: English
- Website: www.fastcar.co.uk

Fast Car magazine was a British car magazine covering the modified car market and car culture. It was the first UK magazine focusing on this genre. It was owned by Kelsey Media, based in Westerham. The magazine was published 13 times a year. Fast Car included stickers, posters, CD/DVDs and other car related gadgets.

== History ==
The magazine was launched in Orpington in April 1987 by Security Publications as an evolution from a short-lived publication called Power and Style. Security Publications was acquired by Highbury House in 2000. Future acquired Fast Car from Highbury House in 2005. In 2014, Future sold its auto magazines to Kelsey Media.

The magazine ceased publication of print issue after issue 438, became online-only.

== Background ==
Fast Car started as a performance car magazine, but now specialises in readers interested in Japanese, European cars and the car culture genre. Fast Car travel the World to give readers a better look into some of the biggest modified car shows like SEMA in America, Wörthersee in Austria and TRAX here in the UK. Fast Car members modify their own personal cars each month and take readers through what they have done.

The magazine also shows Reader's Rides, which the writers judge the very best to the simple daily driver through a verdict. This shows the best modifications and specs of this hopefully future cover cars.

== Reception ==
The Audited Bureau of Circulations (ABC) reports that Fast Car's sales peaked at 127,620 copies in 2003. Historically, Fast Car traditionally sold fewer copies of their magazine than Max Power (which closed in January 2011 due to poor sales). However, Fast Car has been the market leader in this segment since 2007. Its most recent ABC audited circulation figure (in 2010) was 60,000, but the magazine is no longer listed.

In 2012, Fast Car teamed up with SpeedHunters.com for a monthly look into motorsports, drift events, car show/festivals with Speed Hunter's Rod Chong and other Speed Hunters who travels around the world to spread their name and take pictures of the best cars. This was later taken over by Speed Hunter's journalist Suzie Wallace. This segment just faded away from 2013 to 2014.

Their Facebook page is very popular with car lovers with over 4.7 million likes as of March 2016.

== Parody ==
A parody, "Jalopy and Slow Car", emerged.

== See also ==
- Classic Cars
