= Car (magazine) =

British automotive magazine

- Cover of the December 2024 issue
- Editor-in-Chief: Phil McNamarra
- Categories: Automobile magazine
- Total circulation (June 2013): 48,370
- Founded: 1962
- Company: Bauer Consumer Media
- Country: United Kingdom
- Based in: Peterborough
- Language: English
- Website: www.carmagazine.co.uk
- ISSN: 0008-5987

Car is a British automotive enthusiast magazine published monthly by Bauer Consumer Media. International editions are published or licensed by Bauer Automotive in South Korea (since March 2016), Brazil, China, Greece, India, Italy (through 2019), Malaysia (from December 2012 to March 2017, through Astro), Mexico, the Middle East, Romania, Russia, South Africa (under the title topcar), Spain, Thailand and Turkey.

Car features a regular group test under the 'Giant Test' name, which was originally developed by the magazine in the 1960s. It also features 'newcomer' first drives of new cars, interviews with significant figures in the motor industry and other features.

== History ==
The magazine was launched in 1962 as Small Car and Mini Owner incorporating Sporting Driver. It was renamed as Car in 1965. In the 1960s Car pioneered the 'Car of The Year' (COTY) competition that was subsequently decided by motoring journalists on a Europe wide basis. In the 1960s, 1970s and 1980s Car was far ahead of other motoring magazines for the quality and depth of its writing, artwork and photography. Significant contributors during the magazine's heyday included Henry N. Manney III, Douglas Blain, George Bishop, LJK Setright, Ronald Barker, Mel Nichols, Steve Cropley, Russell Bulgin, Philip Llewellin, James May, Stephen Bayley, Alexei Sayle and Rowan Atkinson. LJK Setright in many insightful series of articles linked the development and history of the motor car to its social, technological and historical contexts. Car was also renowned for its 'scoop' photos and drawings and took delight in the irritation it caused to car manufacturers by revealing new models ahead of release so that readers knew what was coming and could avoid buying a model that would soon be replaced. Car regularly featured the spy shots of German photographer Hans G. Lehmann, featuring his work with its own image-stamp emblazoned with the words Hans G. Lehmann - Fotograf. In the 1990s and early 2000s (decade), the artist Hilton Holloway was responsible for a number of projected images of cars in development, first through graphic art, followed later by Photoshop compositing artwork. In 2001 one of his concepts for a Lotus Formula 1 was so accurate that 'Project Hilton' became the code-name for the F1 project within Lotus. In 1992 Car was sold by News International to Emap. Emap published the magazine until 2007.

In March 2009, the magazine's listings section (which gives details of new cars on sale in the UK) reverted to the name 'The Good, The Bad and The Ugly' – which it had used when it was created in the early 1970s – after an absence of nearly three years.

== Sales ==
In the UK Car's sales have been in decline since peaking in the mid-1990s. Car's circulation in 2012 averaged 54,500 copies a month, 37,500 of which are in the UK.

== Editors ==
- 2017 to present: Ben Miller
- 2006 to 2017: Phil McNamara
- 2004 to 2006: Jason Barlow
- 2002 to 2004: Angus MacKenzie
- 1999 to 2002: Greg Fountain
- 1997 to 1999: Rob Munro-Hall
- 1994 to 1997: Gavin Green
- 1993: Mark Gillies
- 1992 to 1993: Richard Bremner
- 1987 to 1992: Gavin Green
- 1981 to 1987: Steve Cropley (two issues were edited by Rob Golding in 1985)
- 1974 to 1981: Mel Nichols
- 1971 to 1974: Ian Fraser
- 1963 to 1971: Douglas Blain
- 1963 to 1964: Nigel Lloyd
- 1962 to 1963: George Bishop
