= Fishing News =

British fishing industry newspaper established in 1913

- Type: Weekly newspaper
- Format: Tabloid
- Owner: Kelsey Media
- Founded: 1913
- Headquarters: London
- Circulation: 4,500 (as of 2022)
- Website: fishingnews.co.uk

The Fishing News is a national weekly newspaper published in London. The paper serves the professional fishing industry.

== History ==
Founded in 1913 in Aberdeen, in 1961 the publishers of Fishing News also began to publish Fishing News International, a quarterly magazine. There was also by then a sister company, Fishing News (Books) Limited, publishing works of reference.

In 1973 Fishing News was published by A. J. H. Publications Ltd. at 110 Fleet Street, London EC4, and was reported to deal with all aspects of the commercial fishing industry, including catching, processing, distribution, and research.

== Present day ==
The paper is now on sale in all parts of the British Isles and covers all relevant news about the British and Irish commercial fishing industries, together with features.

The paper is printed by Mortons of Horncastle, and in 2016 its work on Fishing News was awarded the title Niche Market Newspaper of the Year at the News Awards ceremony in London.

Fishing News runs an annual awards ceremony presenting awards to various aspects of the industry, including 2 distinct Fishing Vessel of the Year categories, several 'Fisherman of the Year' classes. In 2026 they plan to make awards in 12 categories.
