= Land Rover Owner =

UK based monthly magazine

- Frequency: Monthly
- Publisher: Bauer Consumer Media
- First issue: July 1987; 39 years ago
- Based in: Peterborough, United Kingdom

Land Rover Owner International (LRO) is a monthly magazine for Land Rover enthusiasts published by Bauer Consumer Media, based in Peterborough, United Kingdom.

== History ==
The first issue of Land Rover Owner was launched in July 1987 and featured a picture of Captain Mark Phillips and his horse on the front cover. The second issue front cover featured the Queen with her Series III Land Rover. The third front cover showed a Land Rover being driven off-road, which is what has been featured on the front cover ever since.

Land Rover Owner was started by a group of East Anglian businessmen. The first issue cost £1 for 40 pages (mainly black and white), but during that time there were just two models to write about – the Land Rover and the Range Rover. The first two issues sold well.

In May 1990 LRO reported that the Discovery had become the UK's best-selling 4x4 with 1,533 sold in the first three months of 1990. The magazine carried a report in the December 1990 issue on the fleets of Land Rovers that were bought with much of the money raised from the Band Aid record 'Do They Know It's Christmas?' and the subsequent Live Aid concert for the starving population of Ethiopia.

In the mid-1990s LRO was bought by publishing group Emap (which became Bauer Consumer Media).
