= Running Fitness =

Magazine for recreational runners

- June 2005 Issue
- Editor: David Castle
- Categories: Health; Running
- Frequency: Monthly
- Circulation: 1.m (2005) (U.S.); 5.3m (2007) (Worldwide)
- Publisher: Kelsey Media
- Founded: 1985
- Country: United Kingdom
- Based in: Kent
- Language: English
- Website: www.runningfitnessmag.co.uk
- ISSN: 1472-4545

Running Fitness is a globally circulated monthly magazine for recreational runners, published by Kelsey Media in Peterborough, in the United Kingdom.

== History ==
The magazine was established in 1985. EMAP sold the title to Kelsey Media in 2006. The headquarters of the magazine later moved to Kent.

== Website ==
In addition to the printed magazine, the magazine's web sites have provided a valuable resource for runners, including thorough running race event calendars.
