= Car Mechanics =

British motoring magazine

- Car Mechanics cover, November 1980
- Editor: Martyn Knowles
- Former editors: Peter Simpson
- Staff writers: Steve Rothwell; Dave Taylor
- Frequency: Monthly (third Thursday)
- First issue: April 1958
- Company: Kelsey Media
- Country: England
- Based in: Peterborough
- Language: English
- Website: www.carmechanicsmag.co.uk
- ISSN: 0008-6037

Car Mechanics is a British motoring magazine published monthly by Kelsey Media and edited by Martyn Knowles who took over in 2008 from long standing editor Peter Simpson. It is aimed at DIY motorists and the motor repair trade. The coverage ranges across all major car manufacturers and models sold in the UK chiefly in the last five to thirty years. It is the only news stand magazine of this type covering servicing, repair and restoration, with its nearest equivalent Practical Motorist having ceased publication in 1997.

== History ==
Car Mechanics, first issue, April 1958

Car Mechanics was launched in April 1958, originally published by Mercury House, who along with its successors published Car Mechanics until 1989 when the Robert Maxwell bought the company. However he sold the AGB motoring publications within a matter of weeks to Emap after stealing the pension fund. Emap relaunched Car Mechanics as a performance orientated magazine, however in this form the magazine was not successful and in early 1992 Car Mechanics was taken over by the Kelsey Publishing who took it back to its DIY/practical routes and turned a title's fortunes around. Publishing transferred to Bauer Media (who had acquired Emap's consumer magazine division in the meantime) from 3 December 2010, as part of a tit-for-tat dispute following Bauer's decision to take another licensed title (Classic Car Weekly) away from Kelsey, and Kelsey launching its own Weekly title (Classic Car Buyer) in response. As cars have become more complex, with a corresponding increase in the cost and complexity of tools and diagnostic equipment needed, more people are having repairs carried out professionally. This has led the magazine to broaden its appeal to include the independent motor trade whilst still retaining a focus base with the private DIY enthusiast.

Kelsey Media later reacquired Car Mechanics from Bauer in 2020.

== Project cars ==
In the early days of Car Mechanics, project cars were an important part of the magazine and Kelsey reintroduced them, having now had over 100 project cars since 1992. Current projects include a Ford Fiesta MkVII and a Vauxhall Insignia. Past projects have ranged in price from free - Volvo 240, Rover 600, Ford Granada MkIII Ghia to three or four thousand pounds - BMWs etc. They include a Ford Escort MkIV, Ford Mondeo MkI, Citroen 2CV restoration, MGB restoration, Austin Metro, a Jaguar XJ40, an ex police Vauxhall Astra MkIII, ex-customs seizure Citroen XM TD, even a Sherpa minibus and, more recently, an ex-police Ford Mondeo MkIII, Jaguar X300, Volvo V70 diesel, Mazda MX-5, MG ZR, Saab 9-5, Land Rover Freelander, Volkswagen Golf MkIV, Skoda Octavia, Audi A6 Avant, Land Rover Discovery, Jaguar S Type, Vauxhall Astra MkIV, Ford Escort Mexico, Alfa Romeo 156, Lexus IS200, Audi A3, Daewoo Matiz, a Nissan Micra, a Ford Focus Diesel Estate, Vauxhall Zafira, Jaguar X Type, Toyota Prius, Mercedes-Benz E-Class diesel Estate, Ford Ka and Peugeot 207CC . Some of their restoration project articles were compiled and sold in book form.
