= VolksWorld =

- Editor: Paul Knight
- Categories: Automobiles
- Frequency: Monthly
- Circulation: 2,000 (approx)
- Publisher: Kelsey Media
- Founded: 1987 (first publication September 1987)
- Country: United Kingdom
- Based in: Kent
- Language: English
- Website: VolksWorld
- ISSN: 0954-0164

VolksWorld is a monthly magazine about air-cooled Volkswagen vehicles published by Kelsey Media. The current editor is Paul Knight.

== History and profile ==
VolksWorld was started in October 1987. The founding editor of the magazine was Keith Seume, author of The Beetle, a book about the Volkswagen Beetle. The magazine is headquartered in Kent.

Kelsey Media acquired VolksWorld from IPC Mediain March 2016.
