= Diesel Power (magazine) =

Diesel Power is an American automotive magazine that focuses on interests in heavily modifying trucks, SUVs, and cars powered by diesel engines. The original tagline for the magazine called it "The Voice of the Turbodiesel Enthusiast" and it’s now "The World’s Largest Diesel Magazine." As of January 2012, the magazine has certified circulation of more than 135,000 per month according to the Audit Bureau of Circulations.

Diesel Power is published in Los Angeles by the Motor Trend Group and originally debuted in 2005 by Primedia (now RentGroup). The editor is KJ Jones and the art director is Mark Snyder.

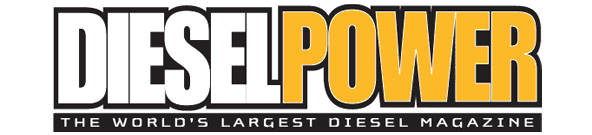

== History ==
Diesel Power was first published in the Spring of 2005 as a spin-off of Sport Truck. It was originally intended to be printed four times per year, but it quickly grew into a monthly magazine and went from 130 pages per issue in 2005 to 250 pages in 2006. For 2015, page count and circulation has been suffering due to a mix of challenges in the publishing industry as well as lack of retail outlets carrying the magazine. The focus has moved to combining Diesel Power with the likes of the Motor Trend staff to help cover and overlap resources between departments currently owned by TEN (The Enthusiast Network).

== Diesel Power Challenge ==
Diesel Power holds an international competition called the "Diesel Power Challenge", where readers compete with highly modified, Chevrolet/GMC, Dodge, and Ford trucks. The event includes competitions in sled-pulling, drag strip racing, fuel economy testing, trailer towing, and dynamometer pulls to determine which truck makes the most torque.

== Project vehicles ==
Diesel Power has constructed a number of project vehicles to demonstrate the potential of upgrading diesel trucks and SUVs. Some of the project vehicles include:

- Project Rust Bucket, a 1989 Dodge Ram D250 with a mechanical Cummins turbodiesel that can produce nearly 1,000 horsepower
- Project Triple Threat, a 1995 Dodge Ram 2500 tasked with daily-driving, sled-pulling, and dragstrip racing
- Project Street Max, a 2006 GMC Sierra Duramax with ECU programming designed for daily driving and producing more than 650 horsepower
- Project Godzilla, a 2008 Ford F-250 6.4L that put out 682 horsepower without the aid of nitrous
- Project 300, a 1994 Ford F-250 Indirect Diesel Ignition bought for just 300 dollars
- Project Jeep Grand Cherokee CRD, with a 4-inch lift, Warn winch, and 376 lb-ft of torque at the wheels
