= Cruisin' Style Magazine =

US automotive publication

Cruisin' Style Magazine was an American monthly automobile magazine, which featured articles on classic car restoration, hot rods, performance cars (particularly Corvettes), muscle cars, street rods, car shows and cruise nights.

== History ==
The magazine started in 1995 and was published on a monthly basis. Produced by a small staff, the magazine has been discontinued.

== Regular features ==
Each issue covers several car shows from across the country, a feature/cover car, how-to articles, and updates on ongoing project cars as well as regular features such as Corvette Corner and Club Corner. Annual showcase issues focus on new products and automotive supply catalogs.

Articles range from small charity events hosted by local car clubs to larger, national events sponsored by organizations such as NSRA, SEMA, and Goodguys.

Cruisin' Style boasts the largest, most comprehensive list of events such as car shows and cruise nights found anywhere - approximately 80 pages per issue organized by state. Both the magazine and the accompanying website cruisinstyle.com contain classifieds for parts as well as cars for sale or trade.

== Writin' style ==
Along with the extensive car show and cruise night listings and focus on local events (though those local events could be anywhere in the continental US), something that makes Cruisin' Style unique is the grass roots style in which it is written. Readers and auto enthusiasts from across the country submit articles and photographs making the magazine's extensive, personal coverage possible.

Generic solutions to common, easily solved problems are not where the magazine shines. Submissions from readers are what make unusual and creative solutions the standard for the tech section. This is also what makes the magazine a virtual car show crammed between two glossy covers.
