= Practical Performance Car Magazine =

British automobile magazine

Practical Performance Car
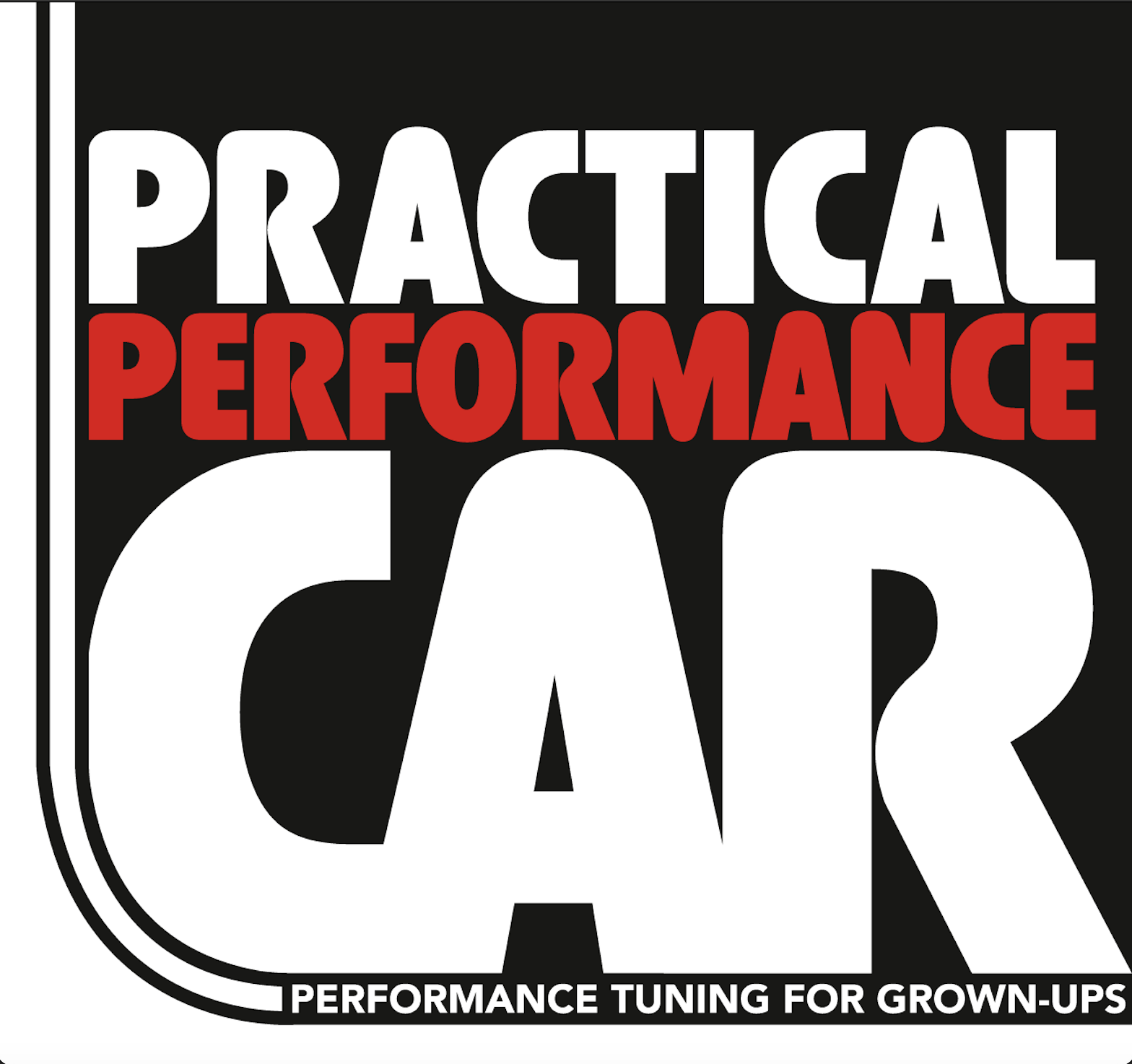
- Editor: Will Holman
- Categories: Automobile
- Frequency: Monthly
- First issue: May 2004
- Final issue: August 2022
- Company: Blockhead Media
- Country: United Kingdom
- Language: English
- Website: ppcmag.co.uk

Practical Performance Car Magazine
- Genre: Cars
- Created by: Will Holman; Ben Allen
- Country of origin: United Kingdom
- Original language: English

Production
- Production location: Northamptonshire

Original release
- Release: 28 March 2024

Practical Performance Car Magazine ("PPC") is a British car YouTube channel and former magazine that was published monthly by Blockhead Media. The channel uses the strap-lines "Performance Tuning for Grown Ups" and "Building, tuning & buying real-world performance cars".

== History ==
The original magazine was launched in May 2004 by former Practical Classics magazine staff members, Will Holman and Kevin Leaper, and took an expert DIY approach to its stated interest areas (above), covering topics in three distinct sections.

The magazine's last issue was published in August 2022, after which Blockhead Media ceased trading.

After an almost two-year hiatus, Will Holman announced the magazine's comeback as a YouTube channel via a video message.

The new channel states that it focuses "on classic cars that enthusiasts can (and do) build on their drive/garage/shed/living room floor, PPC is hosted by magazine founder and editor, Will Holman, and long-term contributor, Ben Allen."

== Front ==
This section of the magazine generally included articles of interest, feature cars, news and updates on those cars owned by the magazine's staff and its readership.

== Tech ==
This section of the magazine generally included technical and expert-technical articles on a very wide range of topics such as modifications to the chassis, engine, suspension or engine management of a selected car. Articles are usually based on technical modifications that are widely applicable, or applicable to a popular model. The section also includes an opportunity for readers to submit their own technical project, which, if selected, will be featured in the magazine.

== Buyer ==
This section of the magazine, as the name suggests, offered advice and tips on buying cars. Each month, the magazine will select a car to feature (for example the Lotus Carlton featured in the October 2006 edition), and provide a multi-page feature covering the car's history, known issues and attractions and advice regarding prices and maintenance.

This section also included classified adverts from both trade and private advertisers.
