= Performance BMW =

British car magazine

Performance bMW
- Categories: Automotive
- Frequency: Bi-monthly
- Publisher: Kelsey Media
- Founded: 1998
- Based in: London, England
- Language: English

Performance BMW is a monthly British car magazine, aimed primarily at BMW owners, published by Kelsey Media, situated in Kent. The magazine was launched in 1998. Its current editor is Elizabeth de Latour.

The magazine focuses on the modification of BMWs for performance and styling.
