= Octane (magazine) =

British car magazine

Octane Magazine
- Cover of the December 2024 issue
- Editor: James Elliott
- Categories: Motoring, Cars
- Frequency: Monthly
- Total circulation (June 2016): 38,428
- First issue: June 2003
- Company: Hothouse Publishing
- Country: United Kingdom
- Based in: London
- Website: subscribe.octane-magazine.com
- ISSN: 1740-0023

Octane is a British car magazine, published monthly, focused on classic and performance cars. It was launched in 2003 and is now published by Hothouse Publishing Limited. The magazine features news, road tests and buyers' guides of classic cars and some modern performance cars, as well as a "For Sale" section that lists cars from all around the world.

The Octane office is situated in Wollaston, Northamptonshire in England.

== History ==
Octane Magazine was launched in May 2003 following a chance meeting between writer David Lillywhite and publisher Geoff Love. They were invited to a meeting about the launch of a motoring magazine (eventually launched as Practical Performance Car) but came away with the idea for a magazine that focused on the upper-end market targeting serious collectors and enthusiasts. They assembled a small team and received funding from Crystal Palace F.C. chairman Simon Jordan in February 2003.

In May 2007, Dennis Publishing, which had recently acquired supercar magazine Evo, purchased Octane.

Octane is published in the UK, Italy, The Netherlands, Germany and Sweden. A Japanese and an Argentine edition launched in 2013.

In 2021, Octane and the rest of Dennis Publishing's automotive assets were spun-off into an independent company, Autovia. In 2023, Hothouse Media, publisher of Magneto, purchased the magazine, leading the re-unification of Robert Coucher, Sanjay Seetanah, Geoff Love and David Lillywhite, the four original founders of Octane.

== Content ==
Octane strives to "feed the appetites of the most hardcore enthusiasts, both old and new," and primarily features news and market analysis, as well as buyers' guides. Octane has featured writing by Pink Floyd co-founder Nick Mason, American television host Jay Leno, AC/DC frontman Brian Johnson, and driver Tony Dron, as well as many others.
