= Auto Italia =

- Editor: Chris Rees
- Categories: Automobile magazine
- Frequency: 12/year
- Publisher: Gingerbeer Promotions Ltd
- Founder: Phil Ward
- Founded: 1995
- Country: United Kingdom
- Based in: Hertfordshire
- Language: English
- Website: auto-italia.net

Auto Italia magazine was first published in March 1995, as the world's first specialist publication to focus on Italian automotive design, motoring heritage and engineering. The founder of the magazine is Phil Ward. The magazine is now owned and run by Michael Ward.

Auto Italia's features are produced by a group of British and Italian writers, who all own, restore or race Italian cars.
