= Test drive =

Driving of a motor vehicle to assess it

A test drive is the driving of a motor vehicle to assess its drivability or roadworthiness, and general operating state. A person who tests vehicles for a living, either for an automobile company, automotive media for review purposes, or a motorsports team, is called a test driver.

The first test drives of a new production vehicle are made by mainstream automobile magazines and other third parties (not customers) for initial evaluation. Once vehicles are for sale, test drives are also usually allowed by vehicle traders (dealerships) or manufacturers to enable prospective customers to determine the suitability of the vehicle to their driving style. Test drives can also be taken before vehicle repairs to assist in diagnosis or after repair works to ensure that the vehicle has been fully restored.

One of the disadvantages of buying a vehicle over the internet is that you may not be able to test drive it prior to purchase.

== Other uses ==
In a broader sense, "test drive" can be used to refer to the testing of anything, such as a computer program, an idea or process, a pair of shoes, etc.

== See also ==
- Proving ground
