= Kullawada =

Dance practiced in Bolivia and Peru

- Origin: Department of La Paz, Bolivia

The kullawada, also spelled kullahuada, cullaguada, or kullawa, is a dance practiced in Bolivia and Peru. Its name is derived from the Aymara word kullawa ("sister"), referring to its dancers. In Bolivia, the kullawada is primarily performed during the Fiesta del Gran Poder, the Carnival of Oruro, the Festival of the Virgin of Urkupiña, and the Festival of Chutillos.

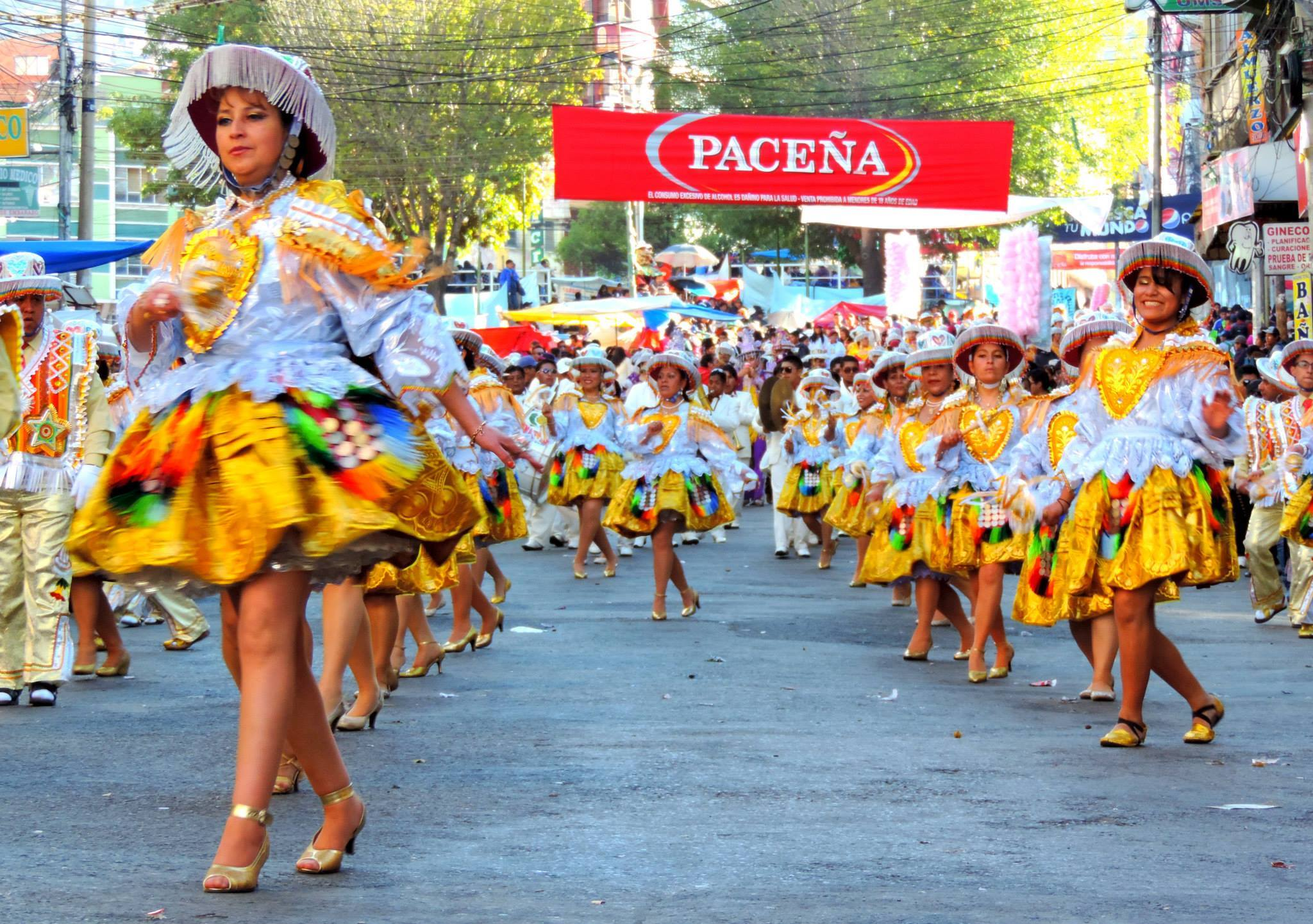
Kullawada dancers in the Fiesta del Gran Poder in La Paz, Bolivia

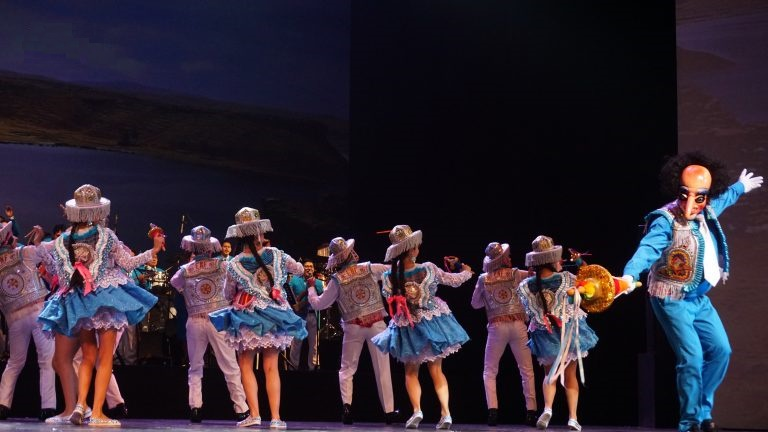
Kullawada dancers in the locality of Puno, Peru

== Origin ==
The Kullawada originated in the Community of San Vicente de Collagua, in the municipality of Viacha, Ingavi Province, Department of La Paz, Bolivia, deriving its name from the Aymara "Kullawas" (spinners/weavers) who practiced this craft in the Andean region, representing the pre-Hispanic textile activity, although its history dates back to the Inca era and is linked to the colonial workshops and the textile tradition of the area.

=== Bolivian arguments ===
According to the Bolivian position, the Kullawada dance originated exclusively in Bolivia in the city of La Paz. The name Kullawada, derives from the San Vicente de Collagua Community (kullawa in Aymara) of the Viacha municipality of the Ingavi Province of the Department of La Paz.

The Kullawada dance originated in the city of La Paz as an allegory to spinners who worked in the Obrajes textile factories located in the city of La Paz.

Kullawada dance is practiced in Puno, Peru due to the Bolivian influence in said Peruvian region. The copying of Bolivian dances in Puno was due to a complex social and economic process. Peruvian researcher Americo Valencia Chacon argues that due to Puno being a far away region, forgotten by its capital Lima, and for its proximity to the city of La Paz, the seat of the government of Bolivia, the people there imitated and copied Bolivian traditions, including Bolivian dances. The Bolivian influence in Puno has been documented since the end of the 19th century. The dances called De Traje de Luces, including the kullawada that is danced in Puno, are of Bolivian origin. This fact was highly criticized in Peru due to the preference for Bolivian dances, causing a process of extinction of the authentic dances of Puno. For the registration of the Fiesta de la Candelaria of Peru in UNESCO in the official documents it is written verbatim: "the dances, music and costumes of the people of Puno are accompanied by the dances, music and costumes of the people of Bolivia".

=== Peruvian arguments ===
According to the Peruvian version, the dance of the "Kullawas", also known as "Kullawada", dates before the formation of the current countries to Inca times and is linked to the activity of ancient spinners and weavers. Some historians maintain that this dance belonged to the Inca nobility, danced by the ñustas and authorities of the empire. Other researchers maintain that several Aymara couples brought to the capital of the empire danced ceremonially to the delight of the Inca and the orejones (noble cusqueños) led by a guide, carrying a large spinning wheel with wool tufts, to represent their ethnic group, their trade, and its importance to the Aymara economy, culture and communication. These peoples were settled on the shores around of Lake Titicaca.

It is documented that these spinners and embroiderers had a presence in Puno, and that part of this community migrated to Lima: "... the characteristic hat of that time had a rectangular shape, there was the Kullawa Achachi, later these embroiderers went to Lima and not I know more about them".

Initially the costumes were simple, with silver embroidery touches that made them look very elegant. In colonial times Westerners persecuted Andean culture in a war against idolaters. Later, under the republican, kullawas were reborn again as a dance of spinners and became a ritual dance. Centuries later it became a dance of ostentation and economic power, turning the costume even more pompous, including pearls, gold leaf, silver and gold threads.
