= Practical Classics =

British car magazine

- Practical Classics, July 2013
- Editor: Danny Hopkins
- Categories: Classic automobiles
- Frequency: Monthly
- Publisher: Bauer Consumer Media
- First issue: 1980
- Country: UK
- Based in: Peterborough
- Language: English
- Website: http://www.practicalclassics.co.uk/

Practical Classics, started in 1980, is a British magazine about classic cars. It focuses on affordable classic cars for the man in the street, as well as more expensive and exotic cars that have now become affordable. It has always had a strong emphasis on DIY and showing the skills and tools needed for restoration, maintenance and repairs. The editorial staff all have old cars that they work to keep running. The magazine features a price guide and buyer's guides to specific models. Bauer Consumer Media, publishers of Practical Classics, claim an ABC audited circulation of 48,033 (July–December 2012).
