= Ascential =

British business media company

- Company type: Subsidiary
- Industry: Advisory; Business intelligence; Events; Media
- Founded: 1947
- Headquarters: London, United Kingdom
- Key people: Scott Forbes (Chairman); Philip Thomas (CEO); Mandy Gradden (CFO)
- Revenue: ▲£206.4 million (2023)
- Operating income: ▲£51.5 million (2023)
- Net income: ▼£5.8 million (2023)
- Owner: Informa
- Number of employees: 700 (2024)
- Website: www.ascential.com

Ascential (formerly EMAP) was a British-headquartered global company, specialising in events, intelligence and advisory services for the marketing and financial technology industries. It was listed on the London Stock Exchange until it was acquired by Informa in October 2024.

== History ==
Richard Winfrey purchased the Spalding Guardian in 1887 and later purchased the Lynn News and the Peterborough Advertiser; he also started the North Cambs Echo. He became a Liberal politician and campaigner for agricultural rights and the papers were used to promote his political views in and around Spalding, Boston, Sleaford and Peterborough. During World War II Winfrey's newspaper interests began to be passed over to his son, Richard Pattinson Winfrey (1902–1985). In 1947, under the direction of 'Pat' Winfrey, the family's newspaper titles were consolidated to form the East Midland Allied Press (EMAP): this was achieved by the merger of the Northamptonshire Printing and Publishing Company, the Peterborough Advertiser Company, the West Norfolk and King's Lynn Newspaper Company and commercial printing sections at Rushden, King's Lynn and Bury St Edmunds.

The magazine division was founded on a hunch when the company's printing presses lay dormant between printing issues of the local papers. The staff gambled that a weekly angling publication would be a hit; in 1953, Angling Times was born. This was soon joined by another weekly heavyweight when EMAP bought Motor Cycle News from its founder in 1956 for £100. EMAP grew significantly in the late 1970s under the guidance of the extremely successful partnership of Sir Robin Miller and David Arculus. In 1992 and 1993, EMAP moved into trade magazines by acquiring titles from Maxwell Communication and Thomson. In 1996, EMAP agreed to sell its 65 newspaper titles, including the 300-year-old Stamford Mercury, to Johnston Press for £111 million.

Scottish Radio Holdings was acquired by EMAP on 21 June 2005. In 2006, EMAP sold its French division to Italy's Arnoldo Mondadori Editore. On 27 July 2007, EMAP announced that it was undertaking a review of the structure of the group in response to receiving a number of unsolicited proposals to purchase parts of the company. On 12 September 2007, EMAP announced that it had completed the disposal of its Australian consumer magazine division, EMAP Australia for approximately £38m to ACP Magazines. On 29 January 2008, EMAP completed the sale of its radio, television and consumer media businesses (EMAP Radio) to German company Bauer for £1.14bn. The remainder of the company was taken over by Eden Bidco Ltd, a company incorporated for the purpose of the acquisition by its owners, the private equity investment group Apax and the Guardian Media Group in late March/early April 2008.

In March 2012, the company announced that it would be renamed Top Right Group, and that its magazines, events and data businesses would be separated into three standalone companies. The EMAP name would continue to be used for the magazines operation, which at the time accounted for around 18 per cent of the group's turnover. The database business was renamed 4C Group, and the events unit was renamed I2i Events Group. Then in October 2015 the company announced that the EMAP brand would be scrapped as all its titles move to digital-only format.

In February 2015, Top Right Group sold Media Business Insight (including Broadcast, Shots and Screen International) to Mobeus Equity Partners and Tenzing PE.

In December 2015, Top Right Group rebranded as Ascential. The company was the subject of an £800m initial public offering in February 2016. The Guardian Media Group sold off its shares of Ascential in 2016 and 2017.

In June 2017, Ascential sold heritage brands (business-to-business titles) to Metropolis International. The transaction included the rights to EMAP name (as EMAP Publishing Ltd).

In July 2024, Informa reached a deal to acquire Ascential for approximately £1.2 billion. The court sanctioned the deal in October 2024, allowing the transaction to proceed to completion.

=== Acquisitions and sales ===
2014

- Money 20/20 - Acquired

2015

- Retail Net Group - Acquired

2016

- One Click Retail - Acquired

2017

- RWM - Sold
- Clavis Insight - Acquired
- MEED - Sold
- 11 heritage brands (EMAP Publishing) - Sold
- MediaLink - Acquired
- HSJ - Sold

2018

- Brand View - Acquired
- WARC - Acquired
- Flywheel Digital - Acquired
- Exhibitions - Sold

2020

- Glenigan - Sold

2021

- DeHavilland - Sold
- OneSpace - Acquired
- MediaLink - Sold

2022

- Intrepid - Acquired
- Sellics - Acquired

2023

- Contagious - Acquired

2024

- WGSN - Sold

== Operations ==
Ascential operates two informational service categories focused on businesses in the digital economy. The two areas are marketing and financial technology.

Marketing

- Cannes Lions
- WARC
- Contagious

Financial Technology

- Money 20/20

=== Previous publications ===
- Architects' Journal
- Architectural Review
- BIG!
- Business Matters
- Car
- Computer and Video Games
- Commodore User
- Construction News
- Datacom
- Drapers
- Eye magazine – Issue numbers 13–25, 1994–1997
- Ground Engineering
- Health Service Journal
- H&V News
- Internet Magazine
- J-17
- Local Government Chronicle
- Materials Recycling World
- Maximum
- Mean Machines
- MEED
- MEED Projects
- New Civil Engineer
- Nintendo Official Magazine
- Nursing Times
- PC Games
- PC Leisure
- PC Review
- PC User
- Pleine Vie
- Retail Week
- Refrigeration & Air Conditioning (RAC)
- Retail Jeweller
- Running Fitness
- Sega Saturn Magazine
- Sinclair User
- SKY Magazine
- Smash Hits
- SPORT
- ST Review
- The One
- The Face
- Which Computer?
