= Automobile magazine =

Genre of magazine

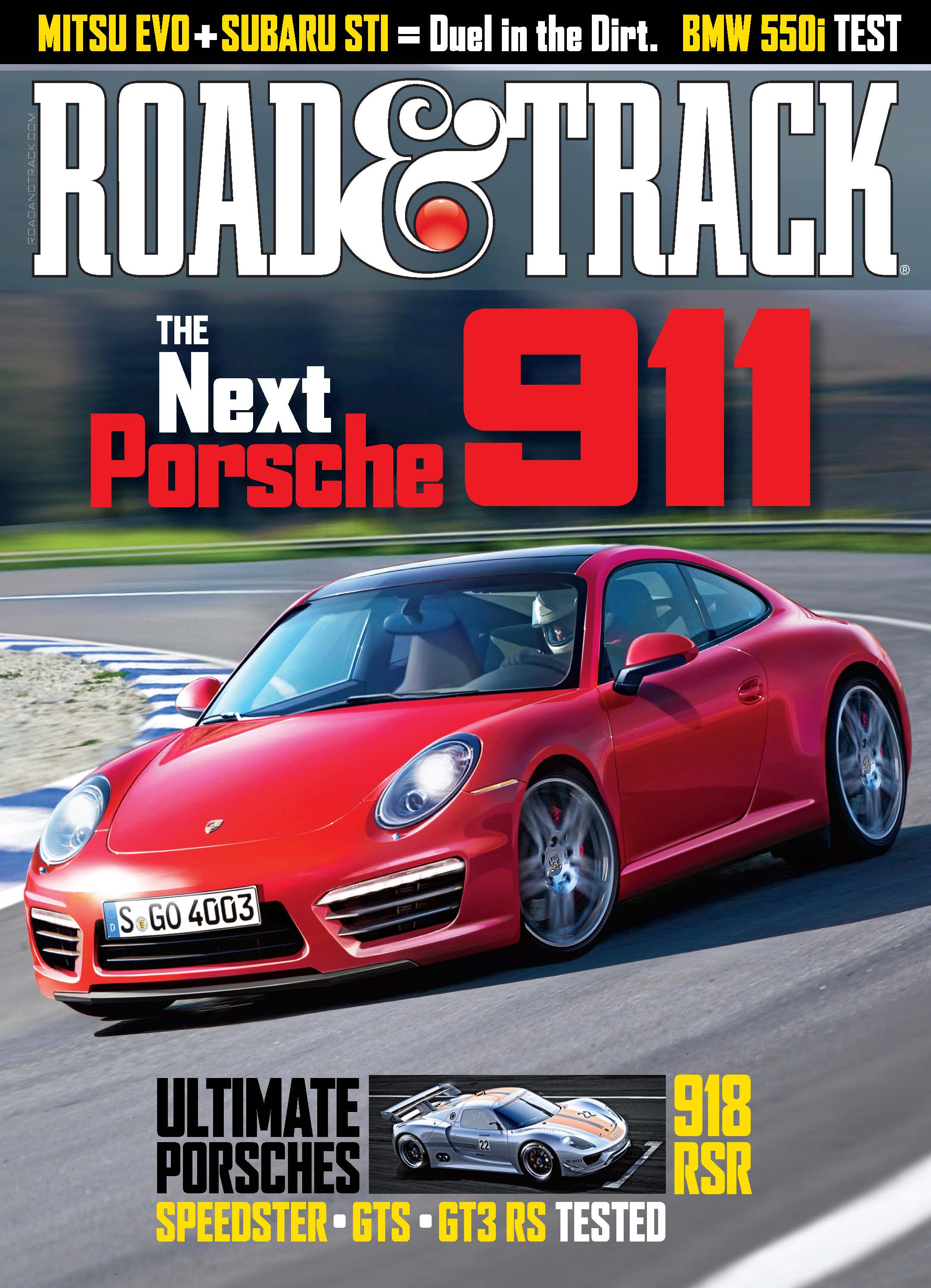
An example of modern automobile magazine (Road & Track, March 2011)

An automobile magazine is a magazine with news and reports on cars and the automobile industry.

Automobile magazines may feature new car tests and comparisons, which describe advantages and disadvantages of similar models; future models speculations, confidential information and "spyshots" (pictures of camouflaged models tested by automakers); modified automobiles; lists of new models with prices, specifications and ratings; used car advertisements; auto racing news and events; and other information.

The first two magazines were launched in November 1895, in the very early days of motoring, the American The Horseless Age, which later became Automotive Industries Magazine and the British The Autocar.

== See also ==
- List of car magazines
- List of motor vehicle awards
