= Jack Slack =

Mixed martial arts journalist

Jack Slack is a pen name of an anonymous British freelance writer, podcaster, analyst and amateur historian of combat sport; most notable as a mixed martial arts (MMA) striking analyst, writing detailed, analytical breakdowns of fighters, fighting techniques and strategies, using videos, photos and animated GIFs.

Slack formerly wrote regularly for BloodyElbow.com, Bleacher Report, Vice Sports and Unibet. Due to successful Patreon support, he independently writes on his blog FightPrimer.com and bi-weekly broadcasts Jack Slack Podcast (formerly named Fights Gone By (FGB) podcast) on YouTube.

== Background ==
Slack describes himself as “a martial arts fanatic from the U.K. who got involved in karate very young, then boxing, then most recently jiu-jitsu". Initially he started researching and writing for his own training improvement in order to compensate for his "shortcomings in his own physicality", and later, by motivation to showcase to the casual fan and the mainstream media how MMA is a highly skillful art form.

In a 2012 AMA, Slack wrote "I've been analysing techniques since I realised that coaches couldn't or wouldn't tell me everything they knew or even what they most liked doing themselves. I knew there had to be more to it than just the same basic techniques performed at the opponent so I started watching boxing. When I started in boxing in my early teens I loved scrapping but I couldn't stand watching a boxing match - watching guys like Joe Louis, Sugar Ray Robinson and Jersey Joe Walcott soon improved me so much that I couldn't stop watching old fights."

Slack's pen name is a reference to Jack Slack the "Norfolk Butcher", the 1743 Norfolk boxing champion who defeated famed English boxing champion Jack Broughton in 1750 as a heavy underdog and remained undefeated as champion until 1760. Slack has said that he does not particularly admire the man, whose life was "more than a little shady", but that the name has "a ring to it".

=== Anonymity ===
In a post on mixedmartialarts.com forum in June 2013, Slack explained his reason for his anonymity: "Only reason I haven't done any video podcasts or anything is because I like being able to train without the pressure of being that guy from the internet. I wouldn't want to do an instructional video - all my content is about what great fighters do! I'm absolutely nothing special in personal ability".

Historical European martial arts (HEMA) writer Peter Smallridge wrote in June 2016 "and while Slack explains his anonymity as the result of his personal lack of athleticism and competitive record tarnishing his analytic reputation, his understanding is top notch."

== Career ==
Slack's first public contribution to analysing striking came in the form of sharing passages from published authors from his book collection. The first one posted on MMASHARE forum August 2011 titled Jimmy Wilde - The Art of Boxing. From January 2012 onwards he started to write and publish his analytical breakdown on his newly opened blog FightsGoneBy, while promoting his articles on major MMA forums and gaining popularity.

In January 2012 he started using the pen name Jack Slack, submitting Fanposts regularly to SB Nation's websites Bloodyelbow.com (MMA) and the now defunct HeadKickLegend.com (kickboxing), and also writing an article for CagePotato. In April 2012, Slack's article was first published on BloodyElbow front page, and soon he became a stipend author for the website. In that same month he was interviewed by sports announcer and commentator Mauro Ranallo on The MMA Show radio podcast. From July 2012 onwards he focused his writing on more popular fighters in order to increase his readership.

In March 2013 Slack was hired to write regularly for Bleacher Report; initially as a featured columnist and later as "Lead MMA Analyst".

The editor of Fightland contacted Slack and offered him a position as a writer. Though Slack's initial intention was to write two articles a month for Fightland while continuing writing regularly for Bleacher Report, which he started doing from November 2013, on March 31, 2014, Slack left Bleacher Report and was writing eight articles a month only for Fightland. Though a regular writer, Slack was not exclusive to Fightland, and wrote articles for Fighters Only magazine and Unibet UK blog. Slack is known for his use of animated GIFs in his articles. Moving to Fightland allowed Slack to embed UFC parent company Zuffa's copyrighted fight footage in his articles.

In February 2019, Slack left Fightland and Vice Sport, and wrote regularly for Unibet.

Since July 2020, due to successful Patreon support, Slack writes independently on his blog Fightprimer.com.

=== Podcaster ===
Since August 2016, Slack is the host of Fights Gone By (FGB) podcast, (now the Jack Slack Podcast) which he independently finances via Patreon.

=== Book author ===
Slack has written and self-published four ebooks:

- Elementary Striking: Strategies for Boxing, Kickboxing and MMA (2012)
- Advanced Striking: Tactics of Kickboxing, Boxing and MMA Masters (2012)
- Fighting Karate (2014)
- Finding the Art: Essays on the Principles, Tactics and Techniques Which Govern Combat Sports (2015)

And one printed book (published by John Blake Books):

- Notorious: The Life and Fights of Conor McGregor (2017)

== Striking analysis ==
While Slack is known for analyzing MMA fighters, he has also published articles on professional boxing such as Pulling Back the Curtain on Muhammad Ali, on Kickboxing such as The Finest Striker on the Planet: Giorgio Petrosyan, on Muay Thai such as Eight Limbs: The Masters of Each Strike in MMA, on Karate such as Glory 19: Why Karate Doesn't Work in the Ring, on Wing Chun such as Wing Chun and MMA: Controlling the Centre, articles on the history of martial arts such as Interpreting the Bubishi: One Thousand Pounds Falls to the Ground. and critical articles such as Wushu Watch: Lessons to learn from Aikido. He has also published semi satirical articles such as Star Trek: The illogical fighting style of James T. Kirk and Street Fighter in the UFC: Hadoukens and Izuna drops. Slack also published articles about fighting techniques in the Animal Kingdom such as Jack Slack: Street Fighting Roos.

Slack has stated in his July 2014 article Jack Slack: Four Strikers That Every MMA Fan Should Be Watching: "Top level grappling, boxing and Muay Thai are light years ahead technically of what we see in mixed martial arts competition, but progress in MMA is shockingly rapid."

Slack's popular series of articles titled Killing the King, which break down the current UFC champions weaknesses, and how they could potentially be beat, have spanned through four different MMA websites during his career: BloodyElbow.com, Bleacher Report, Fightland and FightPrimer.com

Slack lists former MMA Heavyweight Fedor Emelianenko as the top striker on the feet and on the ground, in MMA history. He has published a three part article series titled Analyzing Fedor.

Slack has stated that to him the "striking bible" is the 1940 book Boxing by boxing coach Edwin L. Haislet and that the "grappling bible" is the 2008 book Jiu-jitsu University by Saulo Ribeiro. Slack's favourite book of all time is the 1975 book The Fight by Norman Mailer. Between 2016 and 2017 on FGB podcast, Slack has recommended 41 various books to read.

According to Slack, the 2003 film Ong-Bak: Muay Thai Warrior starring Tony Jaa; "is perhaps the finest martial arts movie of this generation", and that Tony Jaa's multiple attackers scene in the 2005 film Tom-Yum-Goong (The Protector); "[is] the best fight in movie history".

== Reception ==
Matt Saccaro of CagePotato describes Slack as "by far the greatest assessor of in-cage techniques that has graced the keyboard", and Ben Fowlkes of MMAjunkie describes Slack's work as existing "in that rare sports writing space where the reader comes away with a better understanding of the sport itself, rather than merely the people in it". Mike Johnston of Sportsnet wrote "There aren’t many people on the planet better capable of analyzing a fighter’s strengths, weaknesses and evolution than Jack Slack".

Joel Snape of Men's Fitness magazine, wrote "He’s a scholar of the fight game, an excellent technician, and I fully recommend checking out his books and blog – even if you aren’t interested in improving your own striking, it’ll give you a huge understanding and appreciation of the fight game." Graham Barlow of The Tai Chi Notebook wrote "I’d go as far to say that he’s totally changed my appreciation of the depth of the technicalities of Mixed Martial Arts".

Mark Serrels of Kotaku (Australia) describes Slack as a "peerless" writer who is "so on the ball it is unbelievable — to the point where fighters will often approach him for help with strategy or read his articles in an attempt to improve". Former UFC bantamweight champion TJ Dillashaw stated that he used Slack's article Killing the King: Renan Barao in preparation for his fight against then title holder Barao. MMA coaches, fighters and UFC color commentator Joe Rogan have been reading Slack's articles and have found them to be educational. Tristar owner Firas Zahabi stated "He's an expert at what he does and I recommend his material".

George Mills of BT Sport in reference to Slack's 2016 article Justin Gaethje thriving amid chaos, wrote "Looking back in 2020, those words are almost prophetic in describing Gaethje’s ascent through the UFC ranks".

Pundit Arena describe Slack as a "brilliant technical analyst". John Franklin of Combat Press has listed Slack as one of the five best MMA analysts, and stated that "Slack has made Fightland relevant as a place for analysis".

Singapore Evolve daily has listed Slack's podcast Fights Gone By #1 on its 4 Of The Best Martial Arts Podcasts You Need To Start Listening To Immediately article. Following 3 podcasts included Ariel Helwani's MMA Hour, The Joe Rogan Experience and MMAjunkie Radio. They describe Slack as knowledgeable, writing:

Slack loves to delve deep into the technical aspects of a bout, pinpointing the strategic nuances and habits of each fighter that has a direct impact on the result of a fight. More often than not, Slack’s insights are spot and really make a lot of sense.

Technical aspects like the role of reach, the taking of dominant angles, and the significance of feints, among others, are focal points of discussion. Every nuance that can affect the outcome of a fight is examined in-depth and scientifically.

Jeremy Brand of MMASucka.com has recommended following Slack's Twitter account on his top 10 MMA Twitter Accounts You Should Follow list, stating "If you don’t follow Jack Slack, then you may not want to know about MMA on a deeper level. This guy is a wealth of knowledge. His 20.4k followers are treated to some great fight breakdowns and more."

== Awards ==
Slack was a World MMA Awards nominee for MMA Journalist Of The Year 2014 award.
