= Cricket bat =

Item of sporting equipment

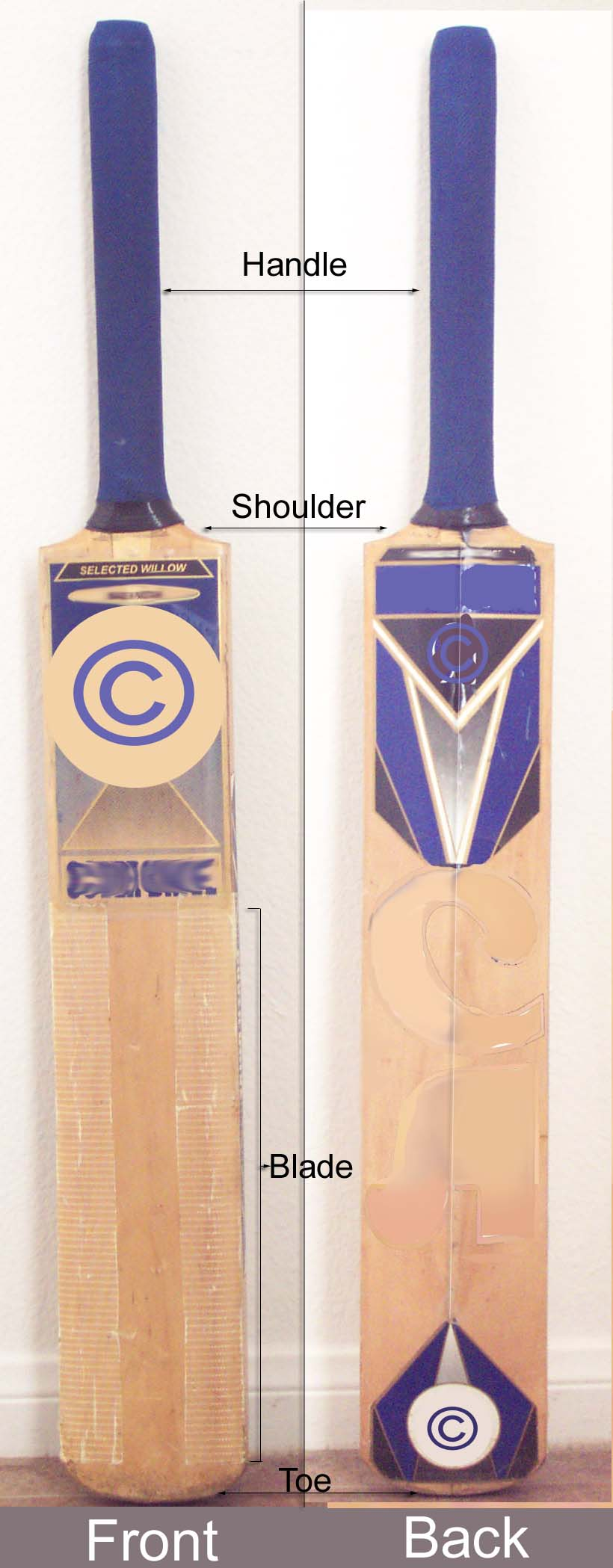
A modern cricket bat

A cricket bat is a specialised piece of equipment used by batters in the sport of cricket to hit the ball, typically consisting of a cane handle attached to a flat-fronted willow-wood blade. It may also be used by a batter who is making batter's ground to avoid a run out, by holding the bat and touching the ground with it. The length of the bat may be no more than 38 inches (96.5 cm) and the width no more than 4.25 inches (10.8 cm). Its use is first mentioned in 1624. Since 1979, a law change has dictated that cricket bats can only be made from wood.

== Construction ==
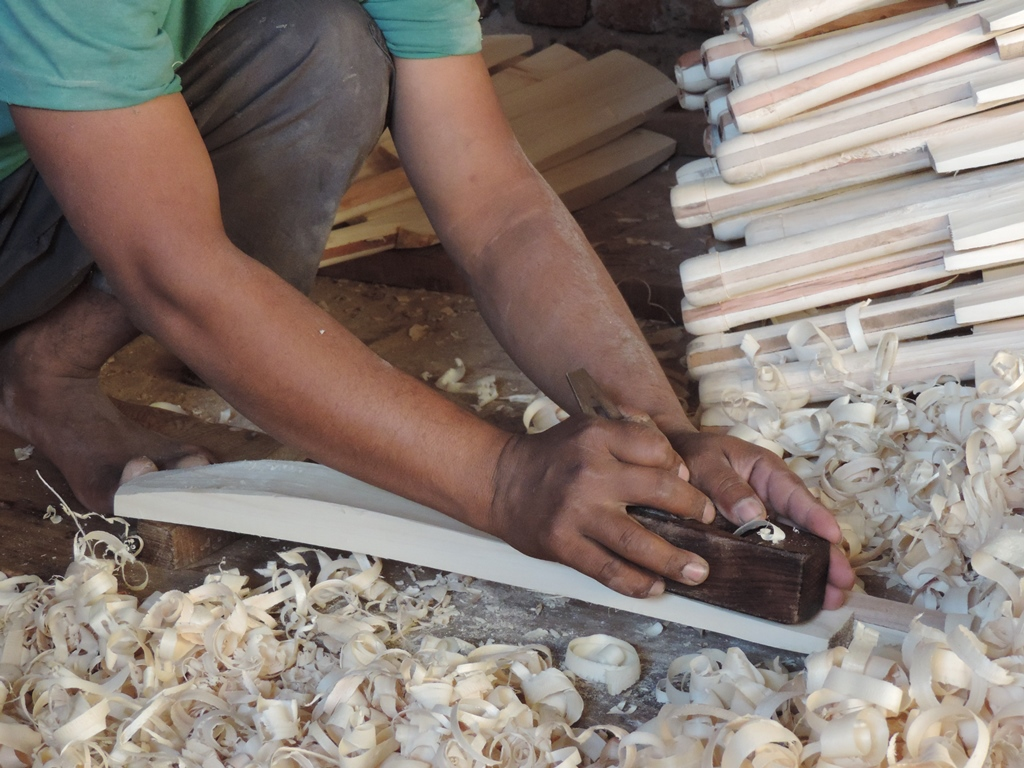
Shaving a cricket bat

The blade of a cricket bat is a wooden block that is generally flat on the striking face and with a ridge on the reverse (back) which concentrates wood in the middle where the ball is generally hit. The bat is traditionally made from willow wood, specifically from a variety of white willow called cricket bat willow (Salix alba var. caerulea), treated with raw (unboiled) linseed oil, which has a protective function. This variety of willow is used as it is very tough and shock-resistant, not being significantly dented nor splintering on the impact of a cricket ball at high speed, while also being light in weight. The face of the bat is often covered with a protective film by the user. In 1900 Percy Stuart Surridge developed a reinforced toe.

The blade is connected to a long cylindrical cane handle, similar to that of a mid-20th-century tennis racquet, using a splice. The handle is usually covered with a rubber grip. Bats incorporate a wooden spring design where the handle meets the blade. The current design of a cane handle spliced into a willow blade through a tapered splice was the invention in the 1880s of Charles Richardson, a pupil of Brunel and the first Chief Engineer of the Severn Railway Tunnel. Spliced handles had been used before this but tended to break at the corner of the join. The taper provides a more gradual transfer of load from the bat's blade to the handle and avoids this problem.

The edges of the blade closest to the handle are known as the shoulders of the bat, and the bottom of the blade is known as the toe of the bat.

Bats were not always this shape. Before the 18th century, bats tended to be shaped similarly to modern hockey sticks. This may well have been a legacy of the game's reputed origins. Although the first forms of cricket are obscure, it may be that the game was first played using shepherd's crooks.

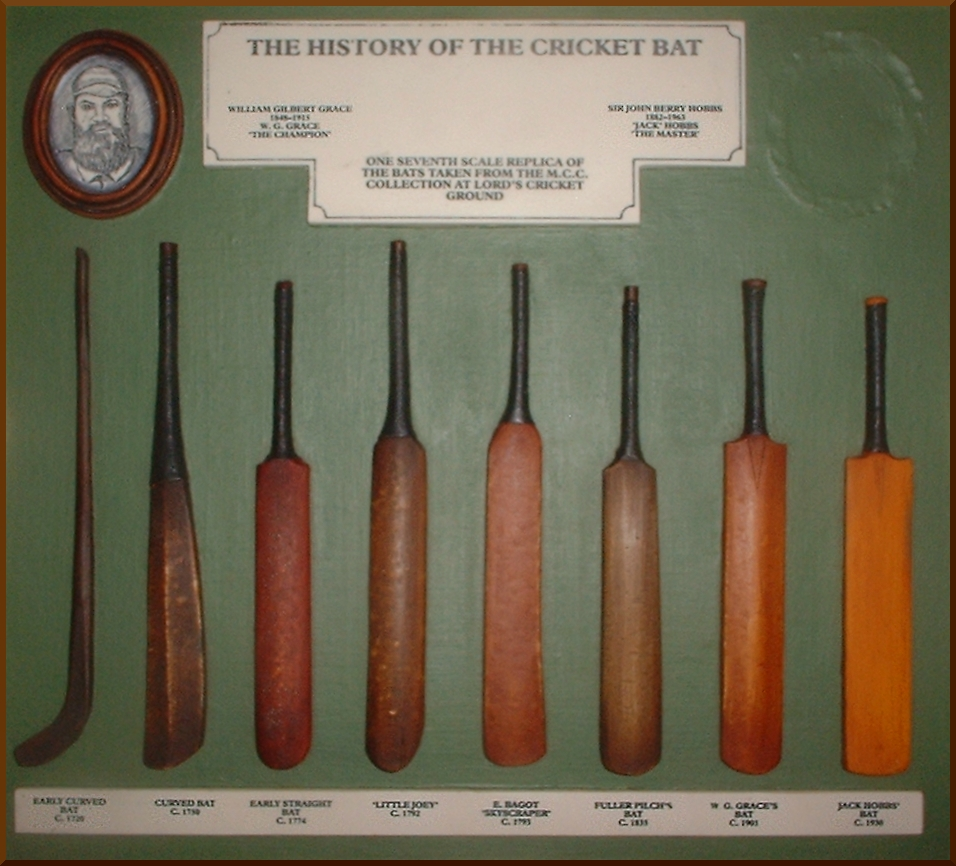
Evolution of the cricket bat

The bat generally recognised as the oldest bat still in existence is dated 1729 and is on display in the Sandham Room at The Oval in London.

== Maintenance ==
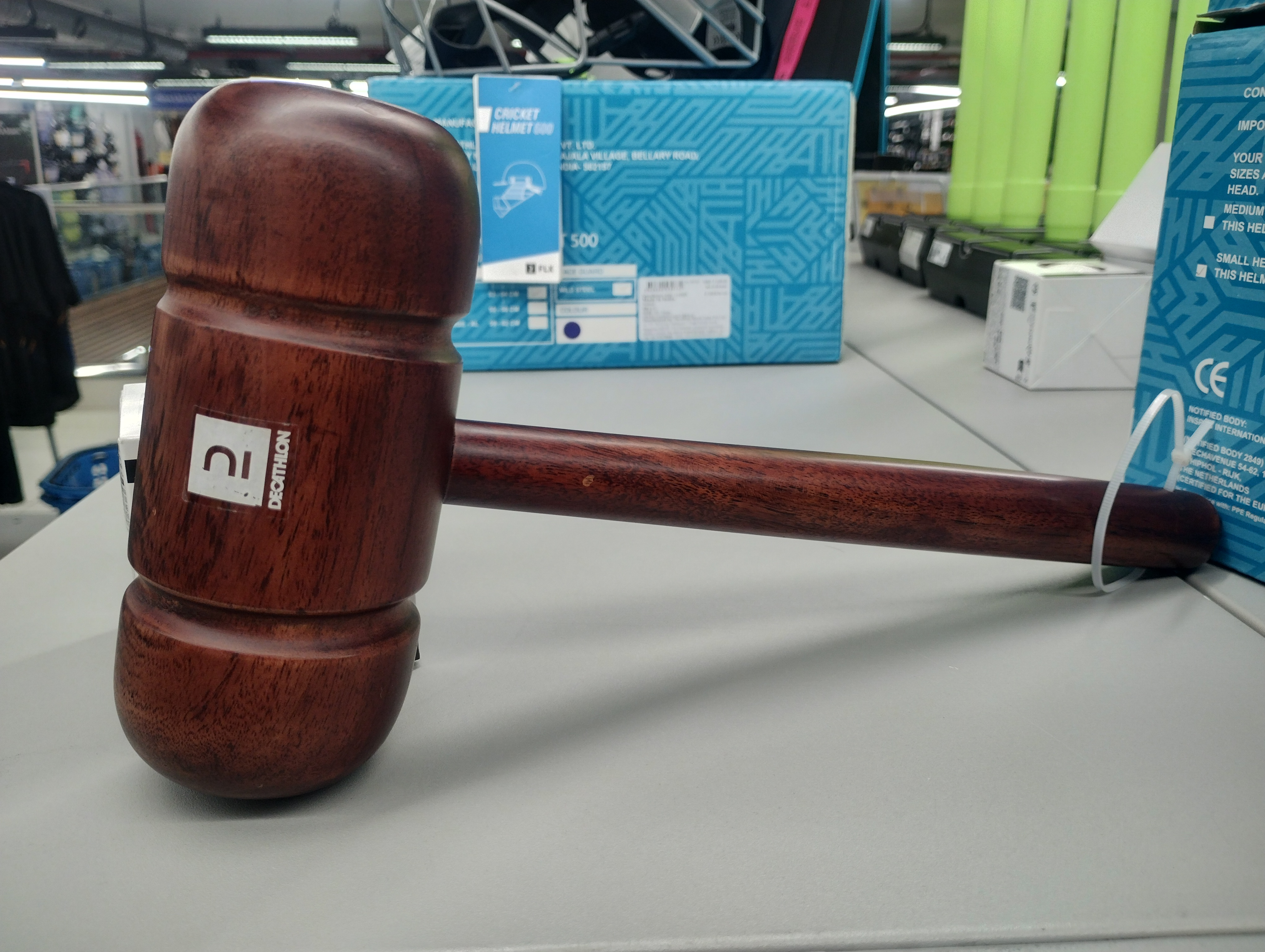
A cricket bat grip cone at Decathlon, Bengaluru (2026)

When first purchased, most bats are not ready for immediate use and require knocking-in to allow the soft fibres to strike a hard new cricket ball without causing damage to the bat, and allowing full power to be transferred to the shot. Knocking-in involves striking the surface with an old cricket ball or a special mallet. This compacts the soft fibres within the bat and reduces the risk of the bat snapping. The bat may also need raw linseed oil, which fills in the gaps between the fibres.

Raw linseed oil is used, rather than boiled linseed oil, as the raw form is also a drying oil but very slow "drying", and so the surface remains tacky. Applied regularly, this has a protective effect on the wood and makes it less sensitive to humidity changes in the atmosphere, which could cause warping or splitting. Another important factor is that it increases the surface friction of the ball to the bat surface, giving better control of the shot. A worn surface can be noticed by the player, indicating that re-oiling is needed.

== Sizes of bats ==
Law 5 of the Laws of Cricket state that the length of the bat may be no more than 38 in (965 mm), the width no more than 4.25 in (108 mm), the overall depth no more than 2.64 in (67 mm) and edge no more than 1.56 in (40 mm). Appendix B of the Laws of Cricket set out more precise specifications.

The 2017 update to the Laws saw no changes to the maximum length of the bat, which is still 38 inches/96.52 cm, but a new specification stated that the edge of the bat cannot be more than 1.56 inches / 4 cm while the depth cannot be more than 2.64 inches / 6.7 cm. The umpires are now given a bat gauge so they can check the legality of the bat at any time.

Bats are available in a range of sizes, with some manufacturers offering unique variations. Commonly found are children's sizes 0 to 6, youth size Harrow and adult sizes. SH (Short Handle) is the most common adult size, whilst long handle and long blade options are also available. Children's sizes increase in length and width as the size increases. Although most adult bats will be the maximum width permitted (4.25 inches), no generally available cricket bat is a maximum length of 38 very few exceed 35 inches.

== Variations ==
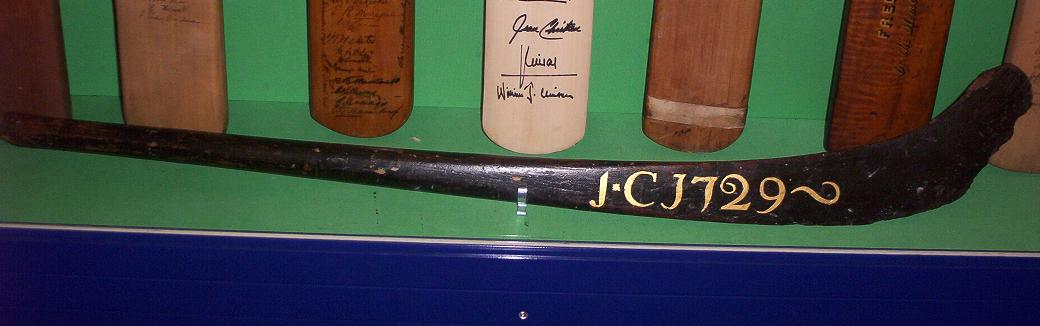
The oldest surviving bat dates from 1729. Note its shape, which is very different from modern-day bats.

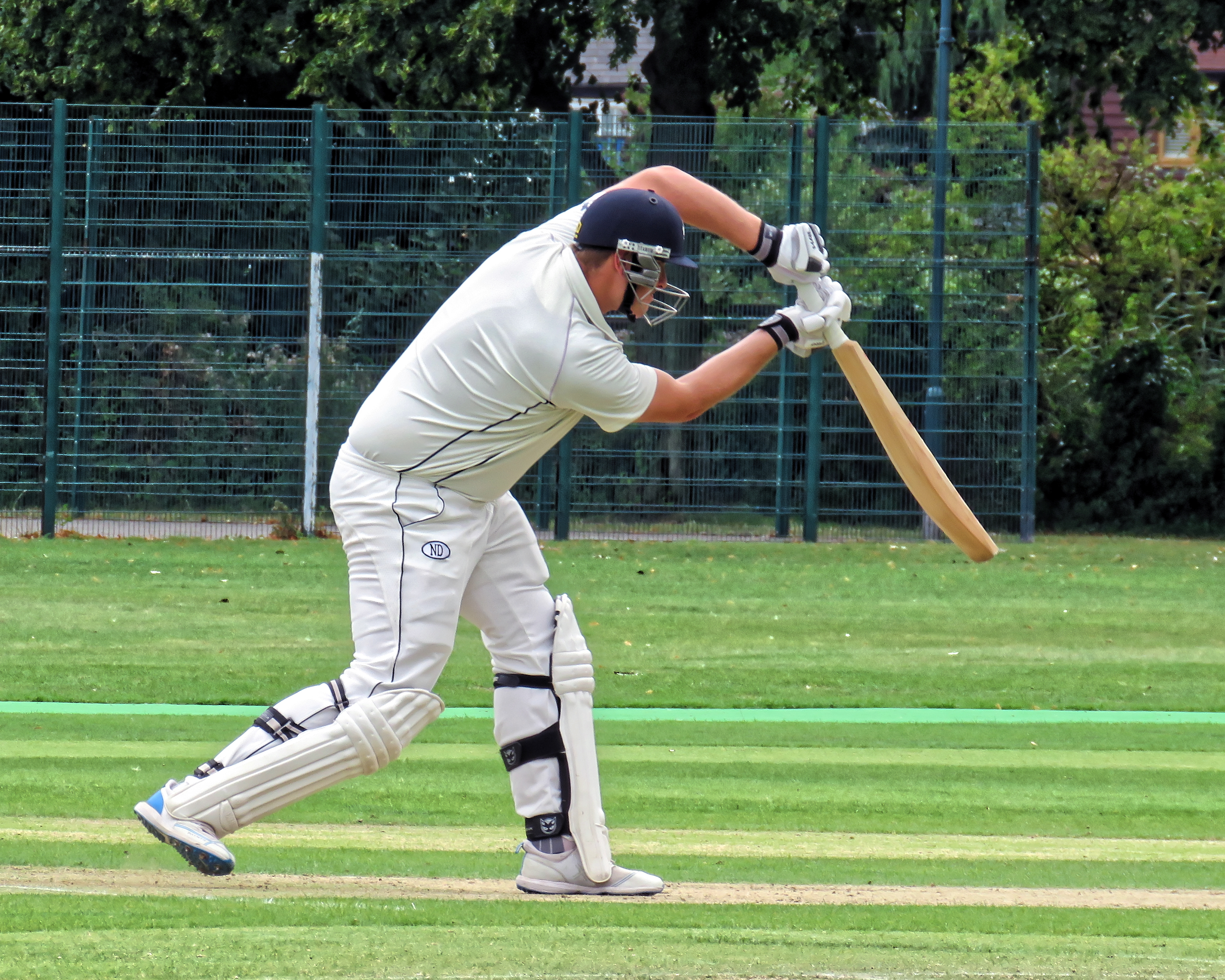
Modern cricket bat in play

Various companies have over the years tried new shapes that come within the laws of the game to make a name for themselves and to improve sales. In the 1960s the first shoulderless bats appeared from Slazenger. This allowed more of the weight to be redistributed to the "sweet spot" of the blade providing more power to each stroke, whilst still having good balance and light "pick up". This style of the bat was made famous by Lance Cairns's six sixes in a match played in 1983.

The 1970s saw double-sided bats from Warsop Stebbing. With the advent of Twenty20 cricket, double-sided bats are experiencing renewed interest.

In 1974 the first GN100 Scoop was released; this was the first bat to turn to shape on its head by removing the wood from the centre of the rear of the bat. By removing this wood, the bat became lighter, its sweet spot grew and its pick-up improved. Even though there is less material, strong strokes are still possible if well-timed. It allows weaker players to play many strokes they would otherwise omit from their repertoire. This bat quickly became a big seller and various scooped bats such as the GN500, Dynadrive and Viper have been released by Gray-Nicolls ever since, including a re-release of the Scoop itself for the 2012 English season. The removal of wood from the rear has been copied by many other companies without much critical acclaim.

In 1979 Australian cricketer Dennis Lillee briefly used a ComBat aluminium bat. After some discussion with the umpires, and after complaints by the English team that it was damaging the ball, which was later proved untrue, he was urged by the Australian captain Greg Chappell to revert to a wooden bat as Chappell believed it was not delivering the same amount of power to the ball as a regulation wooden bat. The rules of cricket were shortly thereafter amended, stating that the blade of a bat must be made entirely of wood.

In the 1980s Stuart Surridge & Co developed the Turbo. Designed by John Surridge, the bat was formed from two pieces of willow which reduced the flex and increased the transfer of power. The bat was used by Graham Gooch for his record 333 against India in 1990.

In 2005 Kookaburra released a new type of bat that had a carbon fibre-reinforced polymer support down the spine of the bat. It was put on the bat to provide more support to the spine and blade of the bat, thus prolonging the life of the bat. The first player to use this new bat in international cricket was Australian Ricky Ponting. Kookaburra withdrew it after advice was received by the ICC from MCC that it was illegal under Law 6.

In 2005 Newbery created a carbon fibre handle, the C6 and C6+, which weighed 3 ounces/85 grams less than a standard laminated cane and rubber handle. It was used by Newbery and Puma for three years before the concept was copied by Gray Nicolls with a hollow plastic tube. However, this provoked the MCC to change the law on materials in handles amid fears that the new technology would lead to an increase in the distance the ball was hit. Appendix B.2.3. in the Laws of Cricket concerns - Materials in handle and states that "As a proportion of the total volume of the handle, materials other than cane, wood or twine are restricted to one-tenth".

In late 2008, SAFBats created a cricket bat with an offset edge. The edge offsetting allowed for an extended middle, better swing weight and increased performance without compromising the cricket bat's balance. The production models were available in 2009, and the bat won awards in 2010 and 2012.

=== Twenty20 bats ===
In 2004, Newbery created the Uzi, with a truncated blade and elongated handle for the new Twenty20 format of the game. This change allowed more wood to be placed in the middle, as more attacking shots are played in the shorter version of the game. In 2009, an extreme version of the Newbery Uzi shape named the Mi3 was launched by Mongoose. The design is unusual in that the blade is 33% shorter than a conventional bat and the handle is 43% longer. Launched with a fanfare of publicity, it proclaimed the idea of not defending the ball in the T20 format and purely playing attacking shots.

On 11 March 2010, Mongoose launched its range in India with the announcement of Matthew Hayden as the brand ambassador. Stuart Law, the former Australian Test player, called it "a half-brick on a stick". The bat was used by Hayden in the 2010 version of the IPL. Gareth Andrew, the Worcestershire all-rounder, scored his maiden 100 with an MMi3 in professional cricket when he hit 100 off 58 balls at the Oval in 2010 against Surrey.

In 2008, Lekka Cricket launched a T20 format bat, the Big Hitter. Black Cat Cricket then launched a T20 format bat, the Joker, in 2009. These worked on a similar principle to other T20 bats with the blade length reduced by one inch and an inch longer handle, but uniquely reduced the width of the bat to 4 inches in an adult bat.

== Manufacturing ==
Modern bats are usually hand-made in the Indian sub-continent (India or Pakistan) due to the low cost of labour. However a few specialists in England, Australia, and New Zealand still make bats, mostly with use of a CNC lathe.

=== Cricket bat industry of India ===
Traditional Indian cricket bats are made in the regions of Jammu and Kashmir, Punjab, Haryana, Gujarat, Uttar Pradesh and Rajasthan. In Kashmir they are made out of willow found in northern India. Some bats made in Kashmir are of international standards and are/were used by national players in India Sunil Gavaskar, Virender Sehwag and Yuvraj Singh.

==== Kashmir willow bats ====
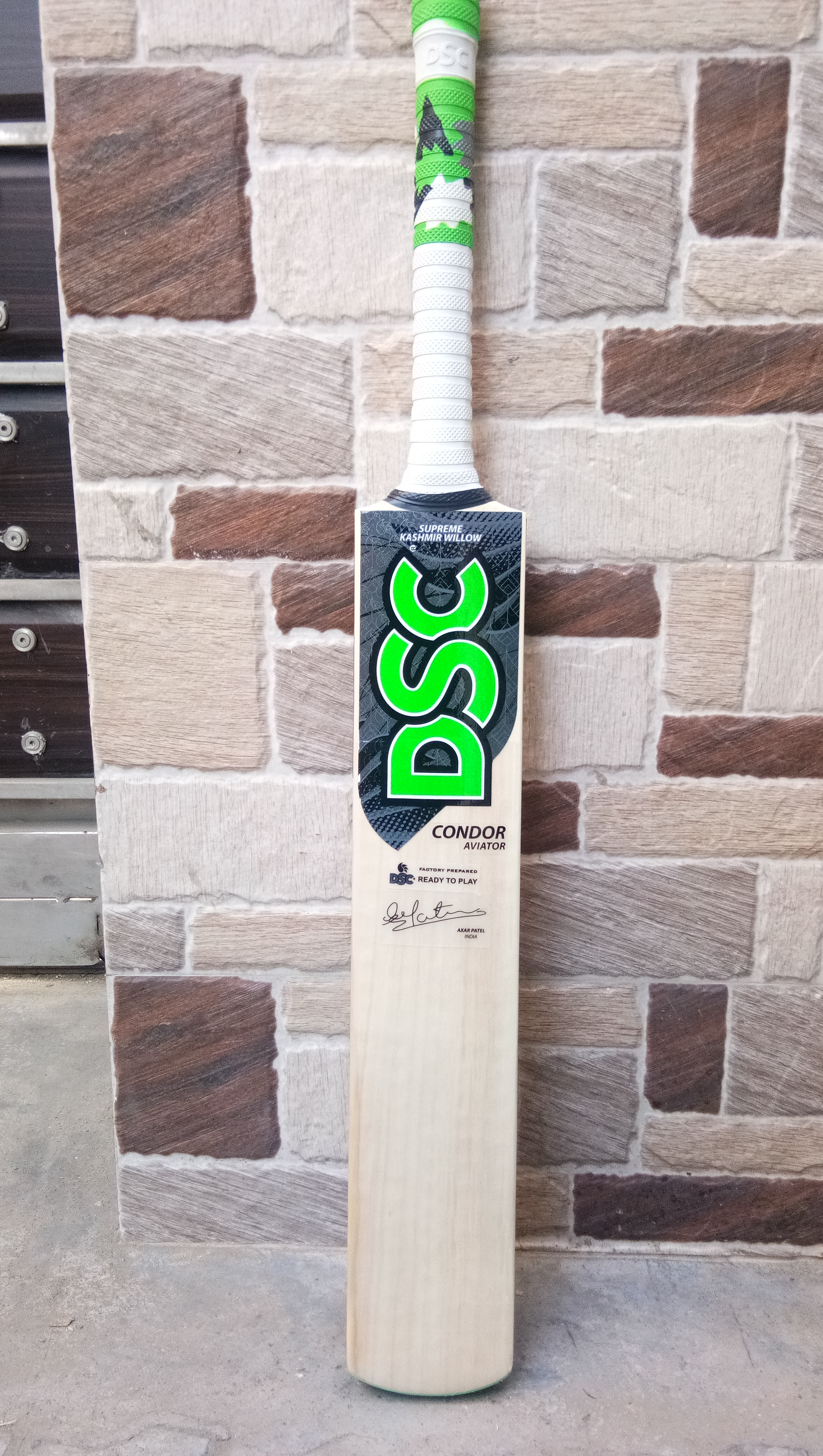
Kashmir willow cricket bat

The willow used in making bats in Kashmir was brought in by the British, who ruled India, during the 1820s. The industry combines traditional tools with modern technology. Some of the districts where these bats are made in Kashmir are Anantnag, Baramula, and Pahalgam.

The species is identical (Salix alba var. caerulea) to English willow. Kashmir willow bats play well and no evidence has been presented that the wood or finished product has different properties or plays any differently. However, Kashmir willow bats sell for significantly lower prices than English willow, on the belief that the English willow bats are superior. Kashmir willow bats are widespread in social and amateur competitions, although English willow is seen as a more "serious" cricketer's bat.

Much of the English Willow cricket bat market consists of bats that are made in India from imported English willow blanks. It would be virtually impossible to detect "counterfeit" English willow bats made from Kashmir willow. The marketing of English willow bats is, therefore, a trust exercise between the buyer and the brand, that the brand has not inflated their supply of "English willow" bats by sourcing blanks from India as well as England. This risk of substitution is a major hurdle for small brands looking to get bats manufactured in India. Resources are needed to ensure the integrity and custody of the English willow at all stages of production.

English willow bats with minor visual defects such as grains that are not perfectly straight, or discolourations, are also cheaper. Former England captain Geoffrey Boycott has stated that such bats will play just as well as better-looking ones and that players ought to buy the cheaper ones to get the same performance at a better price. It is unlikely that any difference in performance can be noted by most players from imperfections unless they are severe. Provided the willow has been handled and prepared competently after felling and during the bat's creation, the much more important factor is the pickup (or weight distribution) of the bat, and its suitability to the player's style. Different shaping techniques create a higher or lower centre of balance, and different "sweet spot" sizes and locations.

One issue presented as the case against Kashmir willow is the warmer growing region. The timber is said to be firmer, with less spring. However, this is a common issue for English willow bats, too. Due to the shortage of stock and demand for English willow, many small plantations on private property have been established in ideal conditions, with trees maturing as young as 10 to 12 years. This has meant a much wider grain in the wood, sometimes leading to bats with as few as 6 or even 4 grains. Bats with 8 or fewer grains are held to be harder and take longer to play well, but also to last longer. Bats with 16 or more grains are held to be softer and more playable immediately but with a reduced lifespan. 8 to 12 grains is commonly the desirable range.

Australia is another country growing Salix alba var. caerulea for cricket bats, with the entire Australian stock descended from staves sent to Australia in the 1930s from the then-England captain to his Australian counterpart. Australia grew its willow for decades until Slazenger bought the company which owned most of the plantations. Slazenger's only interest was in apparel and the plantations were mostly sold and destroyed. In the 1990s a project was launched to again commercially grow cricket bat willow. There are now plantations in Victoria and New South Wales, but not Queensland, where all forms of willow cultivation are banned.

== Modern alternatives to willow ==
With the English willow (Salix alba var. caerulea) trees diminishing in numbers across England, researchers have tried to invent modern alternatives to cricket bats made of wood from the willow tree. According to a study published in The Journal of Sports Engineering and Technology by Dr Darshil Shah and Ben TInkler-Davies of the University of Cambridge, cricket bats made of wood from the bamboo plant provide higher strength than a traditional willow bat and hence, can be thinner and lighter than a willow bat, providing strength similar to a willow bat. The bamboo bat the researchers used was a specially made prototype laminated bat made by sticking layers of bamboo wood together. The sweet spot on the bamboo bat performed 19% better than that on a willow bat.

Alternatives to willow, such as bamboo can further drive cricket's global expansion in regions where the willow tree does not grow, such as China and South-East Asia, where bamboo thrives. This would make cricket bats made of bamboo substantially cheaper than traditional willow bats and thus make the sport more accessible.

The Marylebone Cricket Club issued a statement in 2021 saying that a bat made from bamboo would be illegal under the current set of laws, as Law 5.3.2 of the Laws of Cricket states that in a cricket bat, "The blade shall consist solely of wood..." Since bamboo is grass, this Law would need to be changed to allow bamboo bats. The statement further read that the issue of bamboo bats and other alternatives to willow would be discussed in the next Laws sub-committee meeting.

== Giant bats ==
Several organisations have made giant cricket bats and claimed them as the largest bat in the world. According to the Laws of Cricket, a bat can have a maximum width of 4.25 inches (108 mm), so these bats cannot be used in an official game. As of November 2020, Guinness World Records state that the largest bat is 15.627 metres (51.27 ft) long and was made by Classic Mall Development Company in Chennai, India.

Other giant bats include:

- A synthetic cricket bat 100 feet (30 m) high and 10 feet (3.0 m) wide is installed at Indira Gandhi Stadium in Vijayawada, India.
- LEMU Soft Drinks in Bangladesh created a 70 feet (21 m) long and 8 feet (2.4 m) wide bat to wish the Bangladesh cricket team good luck in the 2007 Cricket World Cup.
- LG Electronics presented a 16 metres (52 ft) long, 2 metres (6.6 ft) wide, 1 metre (3.3 ft) deep bat to the South Africa national cricket team at their final warmup game prior to the 2003 Cricket World Cup. LG's press release shows this bat is the largest ever constructed.
- The Pasban Giant Cricket Bat was unveiled at Defense Stadium, Karachi, Pakistan in the lead up to the 1996 Cricket World Cup. The bat is 50 feet (15 m) in length.

== See also ==
- Cricket clothing and equipment
