= Judge Dredd (1995 video game) =

- North American Genesis box art
- Developer: Probe Software
- Publishers: Acclaim Entertainment; Throwback Entertainment (re-release)
- Designers: Simon Bland; Andy Cambridge; Ben O' Reilly
- Composer: Andy Brock
- Platforms: Super NES, Genesis, Game Boy, Game Gear, MS-DOS, Windows
- Release: Super NES, Genesis, Game Boy, Game Gear: NA/PAL: June 16, 1995; MS-DOS: WW: 1996; Windows: WW: May 23, 2018
- Genres: Action, platform
- Mode: Single-player

Judge Dredd is a side-view action video game released for the Super NES, Mega Drive/Genesis, Game Gear, and Game Boy, originally in 1995. An MS-DOS version was published in 1996. The game is based on the 1995 film Judge Dredd, which was itself an adaptation of the Judge Dredd strip from 2000AD.

The game was released on Steam and ZOOM Platform as Judge Dredd 95 by Throwback Entertainment. It was delisted by its publisher on January 1, 2023, a move that was criticized by ZOOM Platform.

== Gameplay ==
The game allows players to arrest enemies instead of executing them.

The game features run and gun gameplay with a variety of weapons. The player is given a choice to either execute criminals or arrest them.

Levels range from the major futuristic city known as Mega-City One, a prison in a post-nuclear wasteland, ruins and a showdown with the rogue Judge Rico Dredd.

== Plot ==
In the 22nd century, everybody lives in the urban areas of the world. Police officers and lawyers have been abolished and only the Judges are in complete control of human society. One of them, Judge Dredd, must pursue the renegade Judge Rico and Mega-City's most dangerous criminals. Eventually, Dredd defeats Rico and wins a final battle with the Dark Judges to rescue Mega-City.

== Development ==
For seven of the game's 12 levels, the backgrounds were created by digitizing sets from the movie; the remaining five levels use backgrounds based on the comic book.

== Ports ==
A conversion of the game was in development for the Jaguar CD after Atari Corporation and Acclaim announced their partnership in March 1995 that included plans to release three games for the system. Judge Dredd was licensed to Atari months after the announcement of the partnership and was planned for a Q4 1995 release, but the port went unreleased for unknown reasons.

== Reception ==
Reception

Review scores
Publication	Score
Electronic Gaming Monthly	(7.625/10) (SNES) (6.625/10) (Genesis) (5.625/10) (Game Boy)
Famitsu	7/10, 5/10, 5/10, 7/10 (SNES) 4/10, 3/10, 4/10, 4/10 (GB) 6/10, 4/10, 5/10, 4/10 (GEN)
Next Generation	3/5 (Genesis); 2/5 (SNES)

The four reviewers of Electronic Gaming Monthly criticized that the game's bosses are overly difficult, but generally approved of Judge Dredd for its large levels and selection of weapons, with one of their reviewers remarking that "What Judge Dredd lacks in originality, it more than makes up for in playability." They were much more critical of the Genesis version, which they said suffers from inferior graphics, sound, and most importantly, control compared to the SNES version. Similarly, GamePro criticized the game's lack of originality but praised the large levels, selection of weapons, and the ability to arrest enemies instead of killing them. They too gave the Genesis version a more negative review on account of inferior graphics and sounds.

Electronic Gaming Monthly reviewed that the game "translates surprisingly well to the Game Boy", with most of the levels and graphical effects of the home versions, but that the Game Boy version also suffers from inferior sound quality. GamePro's review of the Game Boy version criticized that Judge Dredd is overly similar to previous handheld action/adventure games and has so-so controls, but concluded, "Is Judge Dredd tough? Not guilty. Is it terrific? Not guilty. Is it worth playing? Guilty."

Next Generation reviewed the Genesis version of the game, rating it three stars out of five, and stated that "in the end, Judge Dredd is guilty of one thing, it's yet another side-scroller."

Next Generation reviewed the SNES version of the game, rating it two stars out of five, and stated that "while it's well animated and tightly designed, that still doesn't make Judge Dredd very interesting."
