= AeroGauge =

1997 video game

- North American cover art
- Developer: Locomotive Co. Ltd.
- Publisher: ASCII Entertainment
- Designer: Akira Otsuka
- Programmer: Koji Nakanishi
- Artist: Yasuyuki Nomura
- Composer: Kazuhisa Kamifuji
- Platform: Nintendo 64
- Release: JP: December 19, 1997; PAL: March 1998; NA: May 21, 1998
- Genre: Racing
- Modes: Single-player, multiplayer

AeroGauge (Note: AeroGauge (エアロゲイジ, EaroGeiji)) is a 1997 racing game developed by Locomotive and published by ASCII Entertainment for the Nintendo 64. It is conceptually similar to Psygnosis's Wipeout and Acclaim Entertainment's Extreme-G; the main difference is that the vehicles in the game fly instead of hovering. AeroGauge garnered mediocre reviews, with criticism directed at its routine concept, excessive pop up, lack of weapons and power-ups, and overly high difficulty.

== Gameplay ==
AeroGauge is a futuristic racing game in the vein of the Wipeout and F-Zero series, as well as Extreme-G, with the only major difference being that the racing is done in aircraft; the racers fly in futuristic Aero Machines on tracks consisting of banked turns, bridges, hills, spiraling tunnels, and alternate routes. There are four modes (a four-race grand prix, a single match, a time trial, and a two-player vs. mode) that can be played from a choice of six tracks, four of which are already unlocked and have varying levels of difficulty (the beginner Dug Rug, an ocean-themed level, the neon-colored China-themed Chinoispolis, and the metropolis Earth Cream Circuit for experts). All of them are playable at three different difficulty settings, which only determine the speed of the vehicles. In grand prix and single match, the player races against seven computer opponents.

AeroGauge features ten Aero Machines, five of which are available from the start. Each of the vehicles is rated based on speed, acceleration, shield, and agility. The white, old-school Mitia is the weakest car, Fusaha has the quickest descending and floating, Zero has the greatest handling, the orange Gazpecs is the fastest, and Interceptor has good movement ability and is meant for beginners. An N64 controller is also usable as a vehicle, although it must be unlocked. An Aero Machine can move up to 186 miles per hour and have its position from the bottom changed, allowing for alternate routes at different ground levels. The hovercraft also has a damage meter that increases when it collides with rocks and walls, and each course has a pitstop to recharge. Too much damage results in the race being over. Most Aero Machines have flaps for turning tight corners. A button combo is used to activate turbo boosts, which can only be done when getting out of corners.

== Development ==
AeroGauge was presented at the 1997 Nintendo Space World event. The game's North American release date was initially set for February 1998, but it was delayed to April 2, then to May 1998 a day later as a result of manufacturing issues.

== Reception ==
Reception

Aggregate score
Aggregator	Score
GameRankings	58%

Review scores
Publication	Score
AllGame	3.5/5
Computer and Video Games	1/5
Electronic Gaming Monthly	5/10, 6.5/10, 6/10, 5/10
Famitsu	24/40
Game Informer	5/10
Game Players	8/10
GameSpot	4.5/10
Hyper	69%
IGN	5.2/10
N64 Magazine	10%
Next Generation	3/5
Nintendo Power	6.5/10
N64 Pro	86%
VSixtyFour	5/10

AeroGauge was met with mixed reception. The game held a 58% on the review aggregation website GameRankings based on 12 reviews. Chief among the criticisms were the extreme pop up, the absence of weapons and power-ups, the limited variety of tracks, and the excessively high difficulty, with controls that make it difficult to master even basic maneuvers and AI opponents which race so flawlessly that even a single mistake is enough to cost the player all chance of victory. Kraig Kujawa of Electronic Gaming Monthly said the pop-up is "so extreme in places that it can mess you up by inconveniently popping things up in front of you at inopportune times. This adds a little frustration to a game that isn't too much fun to begin with." GamePro remarked, "Aero Gauge looks impressive at first, serving up wickedly fast hovercraft racing in 3D space, tight two-player split-screen battles, and tracks packed with thrilling loops and tunnels that harken back to the arcade classic Stun Runner. Unfortunately, the game's sparse features (a skimpy lineup of vehicles and tracks and no weapons) and serious draw-in problems quickly limit the fun."

Kujawa and GamePro, along with GameSpot's Joe Fielder, also criticized the music as being dull in composition and grating in tone. Fielder said it "has a tinny, old-school coin-op-type sound, like that of an old Ninja Gaiden machine, and has perhaps the most grating tunes this side of Midway's San Francisco Rush for the N64." However, Kujawa's co-reviewer Shawn Smith found the music catchy, and Nintendo Power said it "keeps you pumped." Nintendo Power also praised the hovercraft physics ("there is a soft, realistic feel to the steering controls similar to flying an airplane in [Diddy Kong Racing]."), but summed up the game as "not as involving as we'd like. Frankly, we wanted more courses, more cars, and more things to do." Game Informer said the game is simply dull due to its overdone concept.

Reviews almost unanimously compared AeroGauge unfavorably to its contemporary Extreme-G. Next Generation, however, argued that the game "may not stand up to the speed, multiplayer action, and track diversity of the upcoming F-Zero X (or for that matter, Extreme-G), but considering that it beats Nintendo's cyber-racer to the punch by more than six months, this should help tide over racing fans nicely." Contrarily, GameSpot and GamePro both concluded that N64 owners should stick with Extreme-G as their holdover title for futuristic racers, with GameSpot describing AeroGauge as "just an all-around pretty dull experience."

Game Players called the graphics outstanding, highlighting the tracks' visual differentiation. N64 Magazine commented that "zipping through one of the horrible strobing tunnels is possibly the best method ever devised for discovering your susceptibility to epilepsy." AllGame noted how the elevation of the hovercraft changed by holding up or down on the joystick, which went against natural instinct of holding up to move forward.
