= Iggy's Reckin' Balls =

1998 racing video game

- North American cover art
- Developer: Iguana Entertainment
- Publisher: Acclaim Entertainment
- Designer: Jools Watsham
- Programmers: Carl Wade; Ian Dunlop
- Platform: Nintendo 64
- Release: NA: August 24, 1998; UK: August 28, 1998
- Genres: Platformer, racing
- Modes: Single-player, multiplayer

Iggy's Reckin' Balls (Note: Iggy-kun no Bura Bura Pyon (Japanese: イギーくんのぶら²ぽよん, Hepburn: Igii-kun no Bura Bura Poyon)) (stylized as IGGY's reckin' balls) is a racing video game developed by Iguana Entertainment and published by Acclaim Entertainment for the Nintendo 64. It was originally released in August 1998. It involves a set of ball characters with faces and unique personalities that race around a series of vertical obstacle courses in order to win medals. The characters use grappling hooks to climb to other platforms and attack other players. The game is named after Iggy, who is the main character. Iggy represents the developer's mascot, an iguana.

Upon its release, the game received mixed reviews from critics. In 2024, the game was re-released through the Nintendo Classics service.

== Gameplay ==
A screenshot of Iggy's Reckin' Balls on Nintendo 64

Iggy's Reckin' Balls is a simple racing game with tower-based levels. The players must pull themselves up to the next level of a tower using a grappling hook, which can also be used to grab and slow down opponents. Each type of stage is divided into 10 towers. The players race up the tower and the first to reach the top is teleported back to the bottom. Once two or three laps (or just one in final towers in each world) have been completed, the tower is destroyed and the player moves on to the next tower. There are ten worlds in Iggy's Reckin' Balls, each containing ten towers.

Power-ups, scattered throughout the 100 courses, equip the players with temporary special abilities. Up to four players can participate. Modes of play include Arcade, Mix-up, Time Trial and Battle. There are initially eight characters to choose from, with an additional nine hidden characters that can be unlocked later.

== Development ==
Iggy's Reckin' Balls was developed by Iguana Entertainment and published by Acclaim Entertainment. The game was pitched by Jools Watsham, drawing picturing and describing the game to Acclaim, who rejected the idea. Watsham, with the help of programmers Carl Wade and Ian Dunlop, created a prototype in two weeks and was approved by Acclaim to make the game. N64.com first revealed its development in 1997 with details such as its tentative title "Wrecking Balls" and having similar gameplay to Putty Squad. Development began in March 1997 and concluded in early June 1998, programmed into a 4 megabyte cart. The grappling hook mechanic was inspired by 1988's Bionic Commando. It was released for the Nintendo 64 in 1998. Following Acclaim's bankruptcy, Throwback Entertainment bought at auction part of their catalog in 2006, including Iggy's Reckin' Balls.

== Reception ==
Reception

Aggregate score
Aggregator	Score
GameRankings	69.35%

Review scores
Publication	Score
CNET Gamecenter	6/10
Computer and Video Games	3/5
Electronic Gaming Monthly	5.5/10, 7.5/10, 7/10, 7/10
EP Daily	7/10
Famitsu	5/10, 6/10, 6/10, 7/10
Game Informer	8.75/10
GameRevolution	B−
GameSpot	6.7/10
Hyper	78/100
IGN	6.9/10
N64 Magazine	56%
Nintendo Power	6.6/10
Official Nintendo Magazine	83%
Total!	82/100
64 Magazine	83%
Arcade	1/5
Gamers' Republic	B−
N64 Gamer	6.5/10
N64 Pro	68%

Iggy's Reckin' Balls received mixed reception from critics, holding a rating of 69.35% based on thirteen reviews according to review aggregator GameRankings.
