= Richard M. Rosenfeld =

American otolaryngologist and medical guideline methodologist

Richard M. Rosenfeld is an American otolaryngologist and Distinguished Professor of Otolaryngology at SUNY Downstate Health Sciences University. His academic work has focused on clinical practice guideline development, evidence-based medicine, pediatric otolaryngology, and otitis media. He served as chair of the American Academy of Otolaryngology–Head and Neck Surgery Foundation (AAO-HNSF) Guideline Development Task Force when it was established in 2005 and has served as an author or methodologist for numerous multidisciplinary clinical practice guidelines.

Rosenfeld served as editor-in-chief of Otolaryngology–Head and Neck Surgery from 2006 to 2014. In 2022, he was inducted into the AAO-HNS Hall of Distinction as a Living Legend.

== Education ==
Rosenfeld received a BA in chemistry from Hamilton College and an MD from the University at Buffalo School of Medicine. He completed training in surgery and otolaryngology at Mount Sinai Medical Center, followed by research and clinical fellowships in pediatric otolaryngology at Children's Hospital of Pittsburgh.

He received an MPH in epidemiology from the University of Pittsburgh and an MBA from SUNY Oswego.

== Academic and professional career ==
Rosenfeld joined the faculty of SUNY Downstate in 1992. He became chair of otolaryngology at Long Island College Hospital in 2007 and subsequently served as chair of otolaryngology and residency program director at SUNY Downstate. He was appointed Distinguished Professor of Otolaryngology in 2016.

Rosenfeld was president of the American Society of Pediatric Otolaryngology from 2011 to 2012. He also participated in efforts to establish subspecialty certification in complex pediatric otolaryngology.

Rosenfeld was involved in establishing the Guidelines International Network North American Community. He was also a founder of the International Society for Otitis Media. In 2023, he became Director of Guidelines and Quality for the American College of Lifestyle Medicine.

== Clinical practice guidelines ==
The AAO-HNSF established its Guideline Development Task Force in 2005 with Rosenfeld as chair. He subsequently served as the Academy's Senior Advisor for Quality and Guidelines through 2024.

In a 2010 ENTtoday editorial, Robert H. Miller, then executive director of the American Board of Otolaryngology, discussed the development of validated otolaryngology guidelines by the task force under Rosenfeld's leadership. An earlier ENTtoday feature described Rosenfeld's role in the Academy's guideline-development process, including topic selection, multidisciplinary panel formation, evaluation of evidence, formulation of recommendations, and external review.

Rosenfeld has served as an author or methodologist for clinical practice guidelines addressing conditions including otitis media, tympanostomy tubes, rhinosinusitis, tonsillectomy, and opioid prescribing.

He was an author of the AAO-HNSF Clinical Practice Guideline Development Manual, which describes the organization's methodology for developing evidence-based clinical practice guidelines. He also co-authored the organization's Clinical Consensus Statement Development Manual.

The Institute of Medicine cited Rosenfeld and Shiffman's work on guideline development in its 2011 report Clinical Practice Guidelines We Can Trust.

== Otitis media and pediatric otolaryngology ==
Rosenfeld's research in pediatric otolaryngology has included otitis media and tympanostomy tubes. In 1994, he was lead author of a meta-analysis of 33 randomized trials involving approximately 5,400 children that examined the clinical efficacy of antimicrobial drugs for acute otitis media.

He subsequently participated in national efforts to promote more selective antibiotic use for childhood ear infections. In 2004, as recommendations were being developed to allow observation rather than immediate antibiotic treatment for selected children with acute otitis media, CBS News described Rosenfeld as being at the forefront of efforts to implement the approach.

Rosenfeld subsequently participated in the development of clinical practice guidelines concerning acute otitis media, otitis media with effusion, and tympanostomy tubes in children.

The Los Angeles Times reported in 2011 that Rosenfeld had helped prepare American Academy of Pediatrics guidelines on childhood ear infections and sought his interpretation of randomized trials concerning antibiotic treatment in young children.

Rosenfeld has also been consulted by national media about research concerning childhood ear disease. In 2006, The Washington Post identified him as an expert on ear infections in reporting on research into bacterial biofilms and recurrent otitis media.

His work has also included office-based placement of tympanostomy tubes in selected children without general anesthesia. Rosenfeld was a founder of the International Society for Otitis Media, which developed from a series of international symposia on otitis media.

== Lifestyle medicine ==
Rosenfeld later expanded his professional work to lifestyle medicine. He founded the SUNY Downstate Committee on Plant-Based Health and Nutrition, became board-certified in lifestyle medicine in 2020, and subsequently became Director of Guidelines and Quality for the American College of Lifestyle Medicine.

He chaired the guideline development group and was lead author of the American College of Lifestyle Medicine's clinical practice guideline on lifestyle interventions for treatment and remission of type 2 diabetes and prediabetes, published in 2025.

Rosenfeld has also written about plant-based nutrition and sports performance. He began marathon running in later adulthood and completed the six Abbott World Marathon Majors. His exercise and nutrition regimen was profiled by Men's Fitness in 2026 in a feature about men who began exercising later in life.

== Selected books ==
- Rosenfeld, Richard M.; Bluestone, Charles D., eds. (1999). Evidence-Based Otitis Media. Hamilton, Ontario: BC Decker.
- Bluestone, Charles D.; Rosenfeld, Richard M. (2002). Surgical Atlas of Pediatric Otolaryngology. Hamilton, Ontario: BC Decker.
- Rosenfeld, Richard M.; Bluestone, Charles D., eds. (2003). Evidence-Based Otitis Media (2nd ed.). Hamilton, Ontario: BC Decker.
- Rosenfeld, Richard M. (2005). A Parent's Guide to Ear Tubes. Hamilton, Ontario: BC Decker.
- Arriaga, Moisés A.; Rosenfeld, Richard M.; de Souza, Christopher, eds. (2026). Pediatric Hearing Loss: Diagnosis, Evaluation, and Management. Springer. doi:10.1007/978-3-032-25356-9. ISBN 978-3-032-25355-2.

== Awards and honors ==
Rosenfeld received the Robert Ruben Scientific Achievement Award from the Society for Ear, Nose and Throat Advances in Children in 2002. He received the Najoua Mlika-Cabanne Innovation Award from the Guidelines International Network in 2016.

By 2019, Rosenfeld had received five Distinguished Service Awards from the American Academy of Otolaryngology–Head and Neck Surgery. In 2022, he was inducted into the AAO-HNS Hall of Distinction as a Living Legend.
