= Nintendo Gamer =

UK gaming magazine

- Issue 80 (October 2012) with cover art by Wil Overton
- Editor: Mark Green (2006–2007); Nick Ellis (2007–2010, 2012); Martin Kitts (2010–2011); Charlotte Martyn (2011–2012); Matthew Castle (2012)
- Categories: Video games
- Frequency: Monthly
- Circulation: ABC 7,745 (January–December 2011)
- First issue: 13 July 2006
- Final issue: 7 September 2012
- Company: Future plc
- Country: United Kingdom
- Language: English
- Website: nintendo-gamer.net
- ISSN: 2049-4300

Nintendo Gamer was a magazine published in the United Kingdom which mainly covered Nintendo video game consoles and software. It was the successor publication to N64 Magazine, later renamed NGC Magazine (1997–2006), and Super Play (1992–1996), continuing the unique style of those magazines. The publication was originally known as NGamer, with the first issue being released on 13 July 2006. From issue 71 onward, released on 5 January 2012, the magazine was renamed Nintendo Gamer and was significantly reformatted. On 30 August 2012, it was announced that issue 80 was to be the magazine's final issue.

Upon launch the magazine covered the Nintendo DS, GameCube and Game Boy Advance game consoles, with pre-release coverage of the Wii. Full coverage of the Wii and Nintendo 3DS was added over time, as were reports about the then-upcoming Wii U in later issues.

== Editorial staff and guest reviewers ==
Mark Green served as editor from issues 1 to 19. Nick Ellis served as editor for issues 20 to 47, and deputy editor Martin Kitts stood in as editor until his return. Ellis returned as editor for issues 54 to 56 and issues 78 to the final 80th issue. Guest reviewers included Wil Overton, Tim Weaver, Alex Dale, Mike Gapper, Richard Stanton, John Walker, Matthew Pellett, Rory Smith, Geraint Evans, and Tom Sykes.

== Other languages ==
A Brazilian edition, NGamer Brasil, was published by Editora Europa from 2007 to 2010. It featured links with the original NGamer and some features from the UK magazine were translated. It was published monthly with a page length of about 100 pages.

In October 2007, the Spanish version of the magazine became available in stores. It was published by Editorial Globus. However, it only lasted 19 issues until it stopped being published in 2009. Most of its content were translated from the UK issues.

There was another Nintendo magazine named NGamer (alternative spelling: [N]Gamer) published in the Netherlands with no links to the UK magazine. This magazine pre-dates the British version by three years; it was published from 2003 to 2013.
