= 1726 to 1750 in sports =

#REDIRECT 1726 to 1730 in sports

- From a page move: This is a redirect from a page that has been moved (renamed). This page was kept as a redirect to avoid breaking links, both internal and external, that may have been made to the old page name.
