= Xbox World =

British video gaming magazine

- Editor: Pat Garratt (2003); Lee Hall (2003–2005); Tim Weaver (2005–2011); Andy Hartup (2011–2012)
- Categories: Video games
- Frequency: 13 per year
- Circulation: 31,030 (July 2008 – December 2008)
- First issue: 17 April 2003
- Final issue: 12 December 2012
- Company: Future plc
- Country: United Kingdom
- Website: Official website

Xbox World was a British Xbox and Xbox 360 magazine published by Future plc.

== History ==
Xbox World 360 began life as Xbox World, with issue one released in early 2003, over a year after the Xbox's release. Published by Computec Media, the editor at launch was Pat Garratt (now of Eurogamer), and the managing editor was former CU Amiga editor Tony Horgan.

Xbox World, alongside sister magazine PlayStation World, was acquired by Future plc in late 2003. The majority of the staff departed during the magazine's move from London to Future's Bath offices. The editor for the first Future-published Xbox World was Lee Hall.

In September 2005, Xbox World relaunched as Xbox World 360 under the guidance of former NGC editor Tim Weaver. It contains an achievements/hint/cheats/walkthrough book and a double sided four-hour disc including a DVD side and a HD side to be run on the Xbox 360.

In the September 2011 issue, the magazine was revamped and for the November 2011 issue reverted to its original name of Xbox World. The Christmas 2011 issue was Tim Weaver's last issue as editor of the magazine. He is now the managing editor, while PSM3's Andy Hartup took over as editor.

On 13 November 2012, it was announced that both Xbox World and sister magazine PSM3 were to be closed down by publisher Future. The final issue of both magazines went on sale on 12 December 2012.
