= Tim Weaver (author) =

English novelist (born 1977)

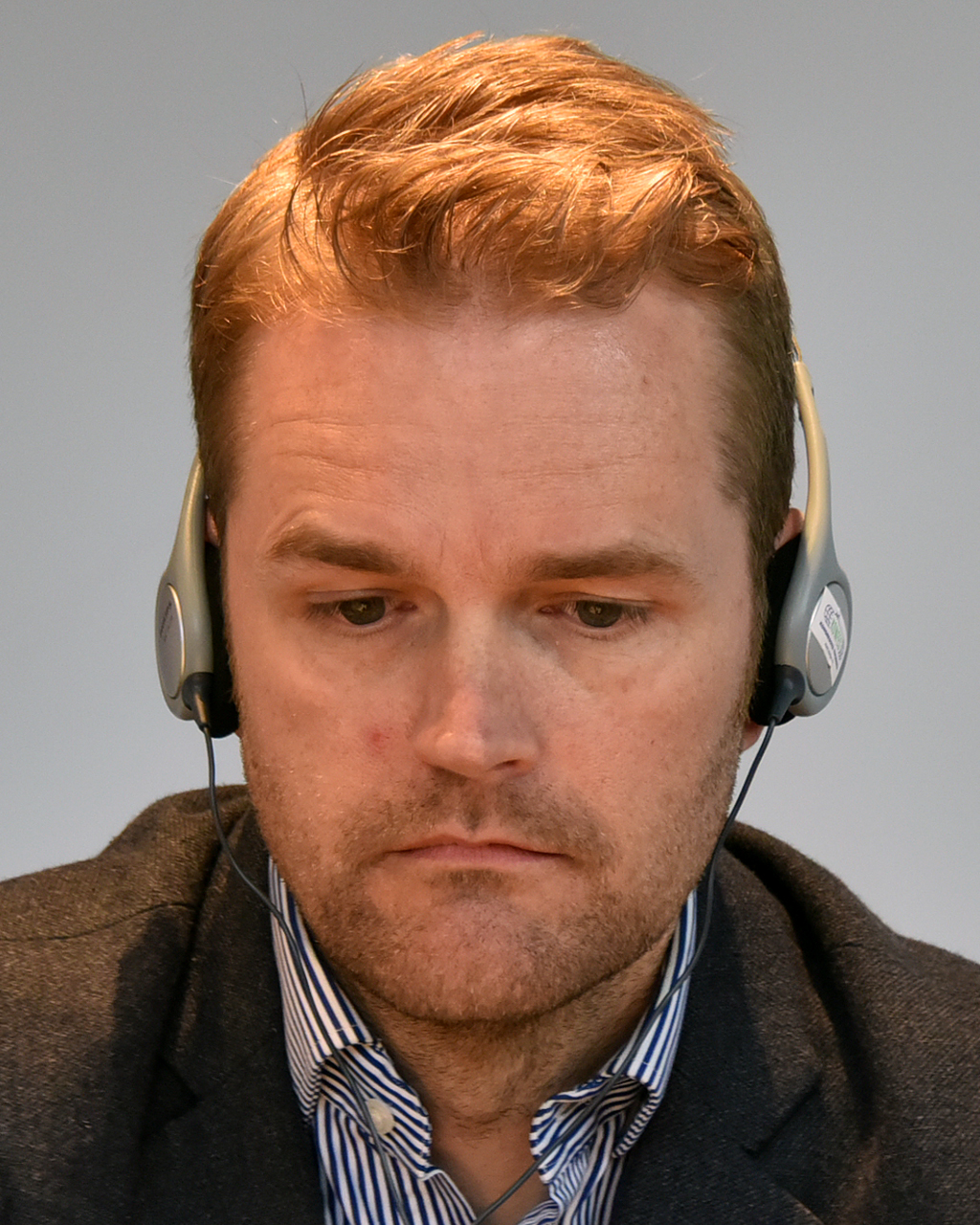
- Tim Weaver (2019)
- Born: 1977 (age 48–49); Bath, England
- Occupation: Novelist
- Writing career
- Genre: Crime
- Notable work: David Raker series
- Website: timweaverbooks.com

Tim Weaver (born 13 July 1977) is an English writer primarily known for his crime thrillers featuring missing persons investigator David Raker.

== Career ==
=== Journalism ===
Prior to publication of his first book, Weaver was a video game journalist. He was a writer for Future plc magazines Super Play, Total!, N64 Magazine, Video Gamer, and Xbox World. He also appeared as co-host of YouTube show GTA V O'Clock.

=== Novels ===
Weaver's debut crime thriller Chasing the Dead was released in February of 2010. The story introduced the character of David Raker. Raker is a former journalist, who gave up his career in newspapers to care for his wife after she was diagnosed with terminal cancer. The book begins twelve months after her death, centering on the mysterious reappearance of a man thought to have died in a car crash.

His fourth book, Never Coming Back, is the first in the series to move entirely away from London, and is set in Devon and Las Vegas. On 28 August 2013, it was announced that Never Coming Back had been selected for the Richard and Judy Autumn 2013 Book Club. On 18 November 2013, it was shortlisted for Crime & Thriller of the Year in the Specsavers National Book Awards, and on 16 December 2013, iTunes included it in their 'Best of 2013' list, naming it Best British Crime Thriller.

On his decision to have David Raker specialise in missing persons cases, Weaver has said: "I just became very interested in the idea of a person going missing in an age where we have CCTV on every street, 24-hour rolling news channels, and constant access to cameras through our phones. It seemed like an intriguing starting point for a book. It sounds trite, but I was also struck by the human cost. Can you imagine how many stories must go untold when a person vanishes?"

In October 2013, Weaver contributed a short story entitled Disconnection to #YouDunnit, a joint venture between Penguin and Specsavers. The major themes of the story – including the victim, crime scene location, and central character – were crowdsourced on Twitter.

Weaver's tenth book, No One Home, was again selected for the Richard and Judy Book Club on 20 February 2020 and on 15 April 2021, Weaver released his first standalone novel, Missing Pieces.

=== Podcast ===
In September 2015, Weaver wrote and presented an eight-part podcast series called Missing, looking into how and why people disappear. It was selected by iTunes as one of the best podcasts of 2015. In August 2016, Weaver recorded three further episodes.

== Personal life ==
Weaver attended Norton Hill School in Midsomer Norton, Somerset. He also describes himself as a "massive, massive football fan," and supports Arsenal and Bath City F.C.

== Bibliography ==
=== David Raker novels ===
- 2010 – Chasing the Dead
- 2011 – The Dead Tracks
- 2012 – Vanished
- 2013 – Never Coming Back
- 2014 – Fall From Grace
- 2015 – What Remains
- 2016 – Broken Heart
- 2017 – I Am Missing
- 2018 – You Were Gone
- 2019 – No One Home
- 2021 – The Shadow at the Door
- 2022 – The Blackbird
- 2023 – The Last Goodbye
- 2024 – The Missing Family
- 2026 – The Lost Women

=== Standalone novels ===
- 2021 – Missing Pieces

=== Short stories ===
- 2013 – Disconnection
