= Throwback Entertainment =

Canadian video game publisher

- Company type: Video games
- Industry: Video games
- Founded: 2006
- Headquarters: Toronto, Ontario, Canada
- Key people: Thomas Maduri (Chairman); Robert Maduri (President)
- Products: Vexx; Extreme-G; Gladiator: Sword of Vengeance
- Number of employees: 25–50
- Website: Official website

Throwback Entertainment is a Canadian video game publisher from Toronto, Ontario.

== History ==
In 2006, Throwback announced the purchase of the Acclaim Entertainment library, consisting of over 190 titles such as Iggy's Reckin' Balls, Extreme-G, Gladiator: Sword of Vengeance, Wizards & Warriors and Vexx.

In February 2011, WeGo Interactive Co., Ltd., located in Seoul, Korea, purchased the Re-Volt franchise from Throwback Entertainment.

In June 2012, Throwback Entertainment launched Double Clutch, an automotive lifestyle site.

In February 2013, Throwback Entertainment launched Sportsgoer, an app for the iPhone that combines schedule data for professional sports.

On May 6, 2015, during Microsoft's IGNITE conference, it was announced that Gladiator: Sword of Vengeance will be made available on Xbox One and the Windows stores. On December 29, 2015, Throwback released TrickStyle on GOG.com.

In 2016, Throwback released iOS 10 sticker packs for Gladiator: Sword of Vengeance, TrickStyle, Legends of Wrestling, Wrestling, SX Superstar and All-Star Baseball on the iMessage App Store. On December 20, 2016, Throwback released Gladiator: Sword of Vengeance on the l Windows Store. Gladiator: Sword of Vengeance was also subsequently released on Steam on January 28, 2017. Both versions included enhanced HD rendering and full controller support.

On February 21, 2017, TrickStyle was released on the Steam store along with the soundtrack as free DLC. On May 2, 2017, Extreme-G 2 was added to Steam. On September 1, 2017, Throwback with Jordan Freeman Group released TrickStyle on ZOOM Platform with exclusive Mac support.

In October 2018, Liquid Media Group purchased 65 ex-Acclaim titles from Throwback for $1 million. This mainly consisted of installments in the NBA Jam, AFL Live, All-Star Baseball and NFL Quarterback Club franchises, as well as some Taito titles that Acclaim published outside of Japan.

In February 2022 the company partnered with Nightdive Studios to release PowerSlave Exhumed.
