= Wil Overton =

British artist

Will Overton
- Movement: Manga

Wil Overton is a British artist, specialising in manga styles.

== Career ==
He has worked for a number of notable British video games magazines, including Super Play and N64 Magazine. He then worked at Rare and was an illustrator for NGamer magazine. After Overton drew the Perfect Dark cover for N64 Magazine at the time of the game's release, the manga-styled Joanna Dark design impressed Rare, and he was hired by the company as a result; the original cell-shaded designs for Perfect Dark Zero were based on this design, but later changed to more realistic graphics.

Since leaving Rare, Overton has been a freelance artist. He provided art for the instruction manual of the 2016 Playtonic Games title Yooka-Laylee.

== See also ==
- Matt Bielby, video game magazine editor
- Julian Rignall, video game magazine publisher
- Helen McCarthy, anime book author
