= PSM3 =

Video gaming magazine

- Editor: Marcus Hawkins (2000–2006); Daniel Dawkins (2006–2012)
- Categories: Gaming
- Frequency: Monthly
- Publisher: Future plc
- First issue: October 2000
- Final issue: 12 December 2012
- Country: United Kingdom
- Language: English
- Website: psm3mag.com
- ISSN: 1752-2625

PSM3 (short for PlayStation 3 Magazine) was a video game magazine specializing in all Sony video game consoles and handheld gaming platforms. It was published by Future plc, a UK-based publishing company.

The magazine launched in October 2000 under the name PSM2 and quickly became one of the most popular unofficial PlayStation magazines on the market. It changed its name to PSM3 in issue 78, focusing more on Sony's PlayStation 3, but still covering PlayStation Portable and PlayStation 2. In July 2011, PSM3 underwent a redesign in an effort to appeal to the "needs of the modern, adult gamer."

On 13 November 2012, it was announced that both PSM3 and sister magazine Xbox World would be closed down by publisher Future. The final issue of both magazines went on sale on 12 December 2012.

== Magazine team ==
PSM3 team (as of January 2010)
Member	Position	Specialist in
Daniel Dawkins	Editor	Adventure
Andy Hartup	Associate Editor	RPGs
Owen Hill	Production Editor	FPS
Milford Coppock	Art Editor	Retro
Richard Broughton	Deputy Art Editor	Action

PSM3 also had a number of regular freelance contributors, including writers from Edge, PC Gamer and NME.

== DVD ==
PSM3's cover disc was popular with readers because of its reviews. Each month, the writers recorded a commentary – much like a director's commentary or a podcast – over footage of recently released games.

In 2007, PSM3 released a double sided disc. One side was the regular DVD and the other side consisted of high definition trailers of new games as well as screenshots and game saves, all of which can be transferred to a personal computer or PlayStation 3.

== Blog ==
PSM3 had been running a blog since the middle of 2006. Initially it was run independently, but in early 2007 it became part of the CVG network, along with other Future games magazines, including Xbox World.

=== The PlayStation 3 video ===
In 2006, through their blog, the PSM3 team released YouTube videos of PlayStation 3 being used in a non-controlled environment. The videos gained a vast amount of hits and were some of the most-viewed on YouTube. Sony quickly removed the footage but it has since been re-hosted by hundreds of other users. The blog was also noteworthy during PS3's Japanese launch; one of the freelance writers, Joel Snape, was in the queue at the Asobits store in Akihabara and blogged live using his laptop. He was second in line and was the second person in the world to buy a PS3 commercially.

== Podcasts ==
On 21 June 2007, PSM3 announced that they would be releasing a podcast and requested suggestions for topics of discussion. The release of the first podcast was praised by readers, and this led to a second podcast (released on 31 July 2007). Again, readers were given the chance to put forward questions. Both of the podcasts were more than an hour long. Many further podcasts were produced since then.

In January 2013, the team produced their final episode and shared their thoughts in an emotional retrospective on 2012 and their history with PSM3. They signed off this episode by playing "I'm So Sorry" (from the game Portal 2).
