= Gladiator: Sword of Vengeance =

2003 video game

- Developer: Acclaim Studios Manchester
- Publishers: Acclaim Entertainment; Throwback Entertainment (2015 re-release)
- Producer: Steve Perry
- Designer: Jim Bottomley
- Programmer: Ged Keaveney
- Artists: Christopher Subagio; Carleen Smith; Alwyn Talbot
- Composers: Nelson Everhart; Ron Fish
- Platforms: PlayStation 2; Xbox; Windows
- Release: NA: 4 November 2003; EU: 28 November 2003; AU: 15 January 2004
- Genre: Hack and slash
- Mode: Single-player

Gladiator: Sword of Vengeance is a 2003 hack and slash video game for PlayStation 2, Xbox, and Windows. Developed by Acclaim Studios Manchester and published by Acclaim Entertainment, it was released for all platforms in North America and Europe in November 2003 and in Australasia in January 2004. In 2006, Throwback Entertainment acquired the rights to the game, re-releasing it on the Microsoft Store in December 2015 and on Steam in February 2016.

The game tells the story of Invictus Thrax, the Roman Empire's greatest gladiator. When his patron, the noble and just Emperor Trajan, dies under mysterious circumstances, Thrax is summoned to compete in the Colosseum by Trajan's successor, the corrupt and despotic consular Arruntius. At the games, Thrax is murdered, finding himself in Elysium, where he is tasked by the spirits of Romulus and Remus with saving Rome by killing Arruntius and his two allies; Phobos and Deimos, the black magic-infused children of Mars.

Gladiator: Sword of Vengeance received mixed reviews, with critics praising the graphics (particularly the lighting), sound design, and storyline. Whilst some lauded the simplicity of the two-button combat mechanic, others criticised it for a lack of depth and concomitant repetitive gameplay. The game's auto-targeting system was singled out by many critics as being especially flawed.

== Gameplay ==
Gladiator: Sword of Vengeance is a hack and slash game in which the player character is Invictus Thrax. The game is played from a fixed-camera third-person perspective, with the camera's position automatically changing relative to the player's current position. Thrax's basic abilities include two different swipe attacks, a defensive roll, magic casting, and finishing moves that can be performed on weakened opponents. The player can also use context-sensitive manoeuvres in specific locations, such as climbing a rope, using a key, pulling a lever, or jumping from a ledge. Thrax has access to three weapons during the game; a gladius sword, a two-handed battle axe, and bladed gauntlets. The sword is the default weapon, with the axe and gauntlets needing to be unlocked.

Screenshot of Sword of Vengeance showing Thrax engaged in combat using the battle axe. The yellow icon above one of the skeletons indicates that the player has locked onto this enemy. The silver icon over another enemy is the secondary lock.

As combat often sees Thrax competing against multiple opponents at once, the game employs an auto lock-on system. When combat begins, Thrax automatically locks onto the nearest opponent. If the player presses the lock button when already locked onto a target, Thrax won't target anyone. Whilst locked on, the player also has access to a secondary lock; when the secondary lock button is pressed, Thrax will switch his lock-on to another opponent. As long as the button is held, Thrax will target this secondary opponent. As soon as the player lets go of the button, Thrax will re-target the primary opponent.

During combat, by combining the two attack types in various configurations, the player can initiate combos. If the player combines attacking with rolling, or if they switch opponents mid-combo, the resulting combo can be significantly more powerful than a standard combo. The better the combo, the more it will charge the "fight gauge", a gauge which rewards the player with mid-combo bonuses. As the player starts to pull off combos, the gauge starts to fill up, with different markers distributed along its length. Once a marker has been reached, that bonus is awarded to the player. Bonuses include double armour, double damage, shield break, and reflect armour. These bonuses are only temporary, with the gauge emptying when the player is not in combat. Each of the game's three weapons has its own unique gauge with different rewards at different points, and each of the three gauges can be expanded four times to make available to the player more significant bonuses (such as quadruple damage, for example).

The fight gauge upgrades are found in optional challenges distributed throughout the game. These are shrines that transport the player to an enclosed arena where they must either kill a certain number of enemies or break a certain number of barrels within a time limit. Oftentimes, there are other restrictions such as only being allowed to use one weapon, or starting with half-health. Aside from the fight gauge upgrades, rewards for completing optional challenges include extra health bars (the player starts with three and can acquire up to 15), upgrades for each of the three weapons (each weapon has four possible upgrades), and collectibles, which count towards unlocking an "ultimate weapon".

The player also has access to "Olympian Battle Magic". Three such powers become available during the game; the Power of Hercules (increases Thrax's strength, speed, and accuracy, and grants him temporary invulnerability), the power of Pluto (allows the player to tag enemies and transfer their health to Thrax), and the Power of Jupiter (sends out a lightening wave every time the player lands an attack, causing damage to every enemy in the vicinity). To use a specific magic, the player must fill the "blood meter", a gauge which fills automatically as the player attacks enemies. It must be filled once to use the Power of Hercules, twice to use Pluto, and three times to use Jupiter.

== Plot ==
The game takes place in an alternate history of the Roman Empire and is set in 106AD, shortly after the mysterious death of the noble and popular Emperor Trajan. With the despotic and sadistic consular Arruntius now on the Imperial throne, he ushers in an age of tyranny and destruction, turning Rome into a personal playground named Arruntium, with even the streets converted into gladiatorial arenas for the pleasure of the increasingly bloodthirsty crowds.

The most famous gladiator, and formerly Trajan's champion, is Invictus Thrax, a Thracian who was taken from his mother and sold into slavery whilst still a baby. Due to Thrax's popularity, Arruntius wants him to compete in one final series of games, promising him his freedom if he survives. Thrax does so, fighting his way to the Colosseum, but he is immediately attacked and killed by something unseen. Sent to Elysium, he encounters the childlike spirits of Romulus and Remus, who reveal that Arruntius assassinated Trajan with the aid of black magic and the rogue children of Mars; Phobos and Deimos. They tell Thrax that he has been chosen by the gods to act as their champion, with his goal being to kill Arruntius and prevent the demise of Rome.

Setting out on his mission, he tracks and kills Phobos, before then pursuing Deimos, who flees back to Rome. The brothers resurrect Thrax, who follows Deimos to the Colosseum, where only moments have passed since Thrax was killed. Arruntius is horrified at his return, and after Thrax fights through waves of gladiators and defeats Deimos, Arruntius murders his own daughter as a sacrifice to resurrect Phobos and Deimos.

Thrax manages to destroy them again and then kills Arruntius by throwing his sword into Arruntius' chest. Romulus and Remus congratulate Thrax on his victory before rewarding Thrax his freedom under the order of Jupiter. The brothers then inform Thrax they may need his services again in the future, but Thrax asserts his status as a free man, saying he will fight for Rome again only at a time of his choosing after he has explored life outside of the gladiatorial arena.

He then recites a paraphrase of part of Canto the Fourth of Childe Harold's Pilgrimage by Lord Byron;

Murder breathed her bloody steam,
And here, where buzzing nations choked the ways,
Here, where the Roman millions blame or praise
Was death or life, the playthings of a crowd,
Then in this magic circle raise the dead;
Heroes have trod this spot, 'tis on their dust ye tread.

== Development ==
Acclaim Entertainment announced the game as I Gladiator in January 2003, with an October release scheduled for the PlayStation 2, Xbox, GameCube, and Windows. At a press event later in the month, Acclaim made a non-playable demo available to journalists, citing as influences films such as William Wyler's Ben-Hur (1959), Stanley Kubrick's Spartacus (1960), and Ridley Scott's Gladiator (2000). The work of Ray Harryhausen, particularly Jason and the Argonauts, has also been cited as an inspiration. In March, Acclaim announced they had changed the name from I Gladiator to Gladiator: Sword of Vengeance. At E3 in May, Acclaim announced that the GameCube version had been cancelled, although no official reason was given.

In the UK, with Acclaim promoting the game as the bloodiest ever made, an unusual advertising strategy was employed. Referred to as "Bloodvertising", poster adverts in bus shelters would seep 'blood'. In reality, cartridges of red dye were placed behind clear sheets of film and slowly released over a six-day period, thus making it appear as if the 'blood' was seeping out of the advert itself and spilling onto the street. Acclaim assured fans that they had their own clean-up crews to remove the dye from the street at the end of the six days.

In Germany, the game was released in two versions; an uncensored version rated USK18 and a censored version rated USK12. The main differences between the two are that all finishing moves have been removed from the censored version, all blood effects have been recoloured white, and severed limbs no longer litter the battlefield during combat.

== Reception ==
Reception

Aggregate score
Aggregator	Score		
Aggregator	PC	PS2	Xbox
Metacritic	69/100	65/100	65/100

Review scores
Publication	Score		
Publication	PC	PS2	Xbox
Electronic Gaming Monthly		4.8/10	4.8/10
Game Informer			5.8/10
GameSpot	7.1/10	7.1/10	7.1/10
IGN	8/10	8/10	8/10
Official U.S. PlayStation Magazine		2/5	
Official Xbox Magazine (US)			6.9/10
PC Gamer (US)	62%		
Play		C	C
PlayStation: The Official Magazine		8/10	

Sword of Vengeance received "mixed or average reviews" across all three platforms; the PlayStation 2 and Xbox versions hold an aggregate score of 65 out of 100 on Metacritic, based on 19 and 25 reviews, respectively; the PC version holds a score of 69 out of 100 from seven reviews.

IGN's Jeremy Dunham scored the game 8 out of 10, praising the combo system, the simplicity of the combat mechanics, the boss battles, and, especially, the graphics. On the other hand, he was critical of the targeting system, the linear level design, and he felt that combat tended to become repetitive. He concluded, "Gladiator isn't going to win any awards or change the way we look at video games. What it will do, however, is help pass the time away for nine to twelve hours." Writing for PlayStation: The Official Magazine, Dunham again scored the PlayStation 2 version 8 out of 10, writing "Gladiator is a little on the short side, doesn't innovate much, and boasts some occasional camera problems, [but] it has enough of the good hacking and slashing to allow you to overlook these minor problems."

GameSpot's Alex Navarro scored it 7.1 out of 10, praising the "great lighting effects and rich, colorful set pieces and textures." On the other hand, he was very critical of the "frustrating" targeting system and the combat's lack of depth. He concluded, "it's unfortunate that the gameplay isn't nearly as interesting or well-put-together as the rest of the game." PC Gamer's Steve Klett scored the PC version 62%. He praised the graphics, sound, and storyline, but was critical of the targeting system, arguing that the "lack of precision means you must resort to frantic button-mashing throughout most of the game." He also felt that "the overall design is weak."

Play's Bradley Fiechter scored the game a C. He praised the graphics, particularly the lighting, but was critical of the core combat mechanics, writing, "there's nothing wrong with simple two-button combat in the spirit of the classic hack 'n' slash, but there is something wrong with making it so mechanical and lifelessly staged." Game Informer's Andrew Reiner scored the Xbox version 5.8 out of 10. He too praised the graphics but was critical of the combat. He concluded, "focusing on detail over substance is definitely an interesting design, but without a solid gameplay package, it amounts to nothing."

Electronic Gaming Monthly scored the game an average of 4.8 out of 10. Joe Fielder called it "a straightforward action game to kill some time with." Paul Byrnes criticised the targeting system, the lack of a block feature and the "nearly useless" roll, arguing that "the game is stupidly, punishingly difficult." Chris Baker cited the "crappy" combat system when criticising "the obscene difficulty." Writing for Official U.S. PlayStation Magazine, Baker scored the game 2 out of 5, again criticising the combat system as "so flawed and needlessly complicated that you never feel like you have full control."

== 2015 re-release ==
In September 2004, Acclaim filed for Chapter 7 bankruptcy. With debts exceeding $100 million, a trustee was appointed by the Bankruptcy Court to liquidate any remaining Acclaim assets, resulting in the rights for many of their games going up for auction from December 2005. Several of these rights were purchased by Throwback Entertainment, including Gladiator: Sword of Vengeance.

In May 2015, Throwback announced that Sword of Vengeance would be released on Windows, Windows Phone, and Xbox One later in 2015. The game was released on the Windows Store in December, and in February 2016, it was made available on Steam. This re-release features resolution support up to 1080p, cloud saving, controller support, and achievements.
