= Extreme-G =

1997 video game

- Developer: Probe Entertainment
- Publisher: Acclaim Entertainment
- Composer: Simon Robertson
- Platform: Nintendo 64
- Release: NA: October 27, 1997; EU: December 9, 1997; JP: May 29, 1998
- Genre: Racing
- Modes: Single-player, multiplayer

Extreme-G is a futuristic racing video game developed by Probe Entertainment and published by Acclaim Entertainment, featuring an original trance soundtrack. It was released for the Nintendo 64 in 1997, with a Japan release on May 29, 1998. Despite the competitive landscape of Nintendo 64 racing games, Extreme-G received moderately positive reviews and achieved commercial success. A sequel, Extreme-G 2, was launched in 1998, followed by two additional titles: Extreme-G 3 (2001) and XGRA: Extreme-G Racing Association (2003). In 2024, the game was re-released through the Nintendo Classics service by Throwback Entertainment, which acquired the rights to the game in 2006.

== Gameplay ==
A screenshot of Extreme-G gameplay on Nintendo 64

The gameplay of Extreme-G primarily revolves around fast-paced racing through a variety of futuristic environments. An assortment of defensive and offensive weapons can be found on the track. These weapons include multi-homing/reverse missiles, magnetic and laser mines, as well as shield-boosting power-ups. Special weapons, such as invisibility, phosphorus flash, and the formidable Wally-Warp, can also be collected; if not avoided, the Wally-Warp can instantly transport a bike to the back of the pack.

As with all Extreme-G games, players control futuristic racing pilots riding plasma-powered bikes in an intergalactic Grand Prix, reaching speeds of over 750 km/h. The focus is on speed and innovative racetrack design, with tracks looping like roller coasters.

At the beginning of each round, players receive three "nitro" power-ups, which provide a temporary speed boost (these power-ups cannot be replenished). Additionally, falling off cliffs or, in some instances, the track itself results in merely losing time rather than lives; bikes are teleported back to the track and must regain their speed and recover lost time from a complete standstill.

The single-player mode offers three difficulty settings: Novice, Intermediate, and Extreme. The main game mode, known as Extreme Contest, features three championships: Atomic (four tracks), Critical Mass (eight tracks), and Meltdown (a full set of 12 standard tracks). Players must secure first place in each championship to progress. Winning championships across various difficulty levels unlocks hidden bikes, levels, and cheats. Once these levels are unlocked, they can be used in additional single-player and multiplayer modes.

The multiplayer modes include competitive racing, flag capture, and battle mode.

== Development ==
Extreme-G was developed under the working title "Ultimate Racer." The game was created by Probe Entertainment, an internal development team of Acclaim Entertainment.

== Reception ==
Reception

Aggregate score
Aggregator	Score
Metacritic	82/100

Review scores
Publication	Score
AllGame	3/5
Computer and Video Games	3/5
Edge	7/10
Electronic Gaming Monthly	8.5/10
Game Informer	8.5/10
GameFan	87%
GameRevolution	B+
GameSpot	8.2/10
Hyper	75%
IGN	7.9/10
N64 Magazine	87%
Next Generation	4/5
Nintendo Power	8.1/10

Extreme-G received "favorable" reviews according to the review aggregation website Metacritic. Critics particularly praised the track designs, which feature numerous loops, jumps, and corkscrews, along with the exhilarating sense of speed. Crispin Boyer wrote in Electronic Gaming Monthly that no other title delivers a sense of speed quite like Extreme-G. Next Generation noted that the game features fast, futuristic, heavily armed speedbikes racing on rollercoaster-like tracks set in some hallucinogenic scenarios. A few critics remarked that the intense speeds create a steep learning curve; however, they concluded that the controls work well overall. Edge criticized the handling of the bikes but highlighted the game's strong emphasis on combat.

The bike designs were also lauded, with several reviewers comparing their aesthetics to that of the movie Tron. GameRevolution praised the game's replay value due to its extensive number of tracks, weapons, and multiplayer options. Critics generally complimented the selection of modes and options, although there were some complaints that the multiplayer modes did not match the strength of the single-player experience. Several reviewers noted instances of slowdown and choppiness in the otherwise solid frame rate when four players are racing, while Shawn Smith of Electronic Gaming Monthly described the tracks in the multiplayer Battle mode as dull and unimaginative. Next Generation stated that while four-player Extreme-G bike deathmatches was a decent idea, it ultimately fell short due to various flaws. Most critics agreed that the techno soundtrack is unoriginal but effectively enhances the mood of the intense races. Although many criticized the use of distance fog, reviews unanimously declared the game's graphics to be outstanding.

Most reviews concluded that while a handful of shortcomings prevent Extreme-G from achieving top-tier status, it remains impressive enough to recommend. GamePro, for instance, stated that Extreme-G would satisfy Nintendo 64 racers until the release of F-Zero 64. Similarly, Peer Schneider of IGN opined that while it cannot compete with Wave Race 64 and Top Gear Rally in terms of graphics, physics, and control, he ultimately recommended it for action and racing fans.

According to N64 Magazine, Extreme-G was a commercial success, selling 700,000 copies by October 1998.
