= Joel Snape =

British writer

- Born: 28 February 1979 (age 47); Ashton-under-Lyne, Manchester
- Occupation: Novelist
- Writing career
- Genre: Children's Literature

Joel Snape (born 28 February 1979) is an English author. He is the author of the Dylan Douglas series, described by the Daily Telegraph as having the "flavour of a junior Martin Amis." He is also GMA-nominated contributor to the UK's Official PlayStation Magazine and unofficial PlayStation magazine PSM3, has written for Venue, and previously worked as The Boy Next Door, an agony uncle for J-17. He is currently the editor at large of the UK edition of Men's Fitness magazine.

== Works ==
- Going Out With A Bang (2005)
- They Think It's All Over (2005)
- Itching For A Fight (2005)
- The Not-So-Great Outdoors (2005)
