= Vexx =

2003 video game

- Developer: Acclaim Studios Austin
- Publisher: Acclaim Entertainment
- Director: David Dienstbier
- Producer: Kristy Tipton
- Designer: Thomas Coles
- Programmer: Chuck Karpiak
- Artist: Gregg Hargrove
- Composer: Nelson Everhart
- Platforms: GameCube, PlayStation 2, Xbox
- Release: NA: February 11, 2003; EU: April 4, 2003
- Genres: Platform, action-adventure
- Mode: Single-player

Vexx is a 2003 platform game developed by Acclaim Studios Austin and published by Acclaim Entertainment for the GameCube, PlayStation 2 and Xbox. The game was released in North America on February 11, 2003, and in Europe on April 4, 2003. It follows the main character, Vexx, as he searches for the Shadowraiths' hearts, needed to power the rift between worlds and defeat the villainous Dark Yabu to avenge his grandfather's death.

The game began development in 1999 and underwent a strained development process, during which many features and levels were cut.

== Gameplay ==
Vexx is a 3D platformer that takes place across a series of nine nonlinear open levels. A set of wraithhearts are hidden in each level, and the player must find where they are located and, in some cases, complete challenges to obtain them. Collecting a sufficient number of wraithhearts unlocks the next level, and players are free to travel between the levels to collect 60 wraithhearts to fight the final boss. Combat takes place primarily through the use of the Astani War Talons, which allow for melee attacks that can be used in several combinations and can be charged to shoot flames for a brief time.

The gameplay has been compared to 3D games in the Mario franchise, such as Super Mario 64 and Super Mario Sunshine.

== Plot ==
In the past, the Astani people of Astara created a rift system that allowed them to move between worlds. However, the Shadowraiths came through the rift, drained it of its energy, and destroyed Astara. Hundreds of years later, Dark Yabu (voiced by Brian Cox), the leader of the Shadowraiths, discovers the village of Overwood and enslaves the Valdani people that live there so they can find the wraithhearts to power the rift. Vexx attempts to resist, but he is spared from Yabu's wrath by his grandfather Vargas, who is killed in the ensuing fight. Vexx sneaks away and discovers the Astani War Talons, which bond to him.

Vexx awakens in the Hall of Heroes, where previous wearers of the Talons are entombed. An old man named Darby (also voiced by Brian Cox) appears and informs him he carried Vexx to the Hall after thinking he was dead. He also tells Vexx that Yabu completely destroyed the village, and that Vexx and Darby are the only survivors. Darby is too old to fight, so he instructs Vexx to collect the wraithhearts and use them to power the rift and find and stop Yabu before he opens the gate to his own world. Before Vexx departs, Darby warns him the Shadowraiths are shapeshifters and to "trust no one along your journey".

After collecting several wraithhearts, Vexx meets up with Darby inside the Landspire, and they encounter Reia, the last remaining Astani warrior. Reia exposes Darby, who is revealed to be Dark Yabu in disguise. Both Reia and Vexx try to attack Yabu, but he escapes, taking Reia's magical staff with him. It is revealed that by collecting the wraithhearts, Vexx was helping Yabu power the gate to his own world. Since the only way to close the rift is with Reia's staff, Vexx has to activate the rest of the gates and catch up to Yabu to get it back.

After collecting 60 wraithhearts, Vexx finds Yabu in the Shadow Realm, and the two fight one last time. During the battle, Vexx manages to take Yabu's amulet, which gives him more power. Vexx wins and retrieves the staff, but Yabu's death causes the platform on which he and the portal back to Astara stand to crumble. Unable to get back through the portal, Vexx throws the staff through, closing the rift and saving Astara, but trapping himself in the shadow realm.

== Development and release ==
=== Creation and character design ===
Development of Vexx began in late 1999 by Acclaim Studios Austin, with the studio wanting to create a mascot platformer for the then-next generation consoles. The development team was led by creative director David Dienstbier and designer Thomas Coles and varied in size, ranging from around 22-40 people who had worked on some of Iguana's previous titles, such as Turok: Dinosaur Hunter. Coles cited several platform games as inspiration for the game, specifically Super Mario 64 and Banjo-Kazooie.

The game was initially titled Clip and Mischief, and starred a rodent-like creature named Clip, who had a small, reptilian sidekick named Mischief. This idea was shelved when the development team thought the concept was too similar to Jak and Daxter. To differentiate the game, several gameplay mechanics were changed about halfway through development, primarily the focus on one main playable character. The development team renamed the main character Jinx based on his bad luck and his knack for getting into terrible situations, but faced legal issues with the name. The character was renamed Vexx out of the notion that he would try to turn his bad luck onto his enemies.

Vexx's design changed several times during development. Designers initially submitted ideas for a character that Acclaim would be proud to have as their own brand mascot. The development team soon came to the conclusion that the character should be designed around the gameplay mechanics, and not the other way around. As Coles explained, "Mario is not a great character because he's Mario and he's designed out of nowhere. He's Mario because of the games he's been in and people have grown to love him." After creating the core gameplay mechanics, Acclaim did focus testing and worked on finalizing the design, taking inspiration from many sources. Vexx's gauntlets, for example, were inspired by the gloves of Gully, a character from the Image Comics series Battle Chasers, and the team found them perfect for applying effects to give them the moveset they wanted. Though the development team tried to create a focused story for the game, they left Vexx's backstory open-ended to allow players to more freely identify with the character as an everyman hero.

=== Technological development ===
Technology development on the game began in the first half of 2000, with the first game assets being created in November 2000. Early work on Vexx was done on PC, since the then-next generation consoles had not been released yet. The game was always planned to be released on all three platforms, but the team found it easiest to transition to the Xbox, due to its use of the same development tools. As development progressed, the team branched out and had people working on all three versions simultaneously. Acclaim tried to play to the strengths of each console, supporting, for example, Dolby Digital on Xbox and Dolby Pro-Logic II on the PlayStation 2 and GameCube. With the exception of these and minor tweaks involving the platforms' controllers, the three versions are identical. Vexx was developed at the same time as Turok: Evolution, and though the games were developed by different development teams at Acclaim Studios Austin, they share the same engine and many of the same resources.

=== Late changes and release ===
The game was unveiled at E3 2001 as Jinx and re-introduced as Vexx on January 14, 2002. Vexx was originally slated for an October 2002 release, but was delayed for the team to have extra time to polish the game. The development team was inspired by the then-newly released Super Mario Sunshine and its use of previews showing players where to find the shine sprites in the game, and added similar previews in the form of arrow indicators as a last-ditch effort to make the game easier for casual players. Vexx was finally released in North America on February 11, 2003, and in Europe on April 4, 2003. The game was published by Acclaim Entertainment for the PlayStation 2, GameCube and Xbox video game consoles.

Due to time constraints and insufficient funding, much content was cut during development. Vexx originally featured six worlds, with each world containing three levels, forming a combined total of 18 levels. The worlds idea was eventually scrapped, and half of the levels were cut from the game to focus on the remaining nine a year before the game was released. The game originally featured six bosses, including a troll boss featuring heavily in pre-release footage who eventually ended up as an NPC. The game's day/night cycle was supposed to play a significantly larger role as well, with the development team trying to create a light/dark world akin to The Legend of Zelda: A Link to the Past. Several suit power-ups were also cut from the game, including an underwater suit that allowed Vexx to swim faster.

== Reception ==
Reception

Aggregate score
Aggregator	Score		
Aggregator	GameCube	PS2	Xbox
Metacritic	71/100	63/100	70/100

Review scores
Publication	Score		
Publication	GameCube	PS2	Xbox
Edge	3/10	3/10	3/10
Electronic Gaming Monthly	7.5/10 (Note: Three critics of Electronic Gaming Monthly gave the GameCube version each a score of 9/10, 7.5/10, and 6/10.)	N/A	N/A
EP Daily	N/A	N/A	7/10
Eurogamer	N/A	3/10	N/A
Game Informer	8.25/10	6.75/10	8/10
GameSpot	6.3/10	6.3/10	6.3/10
GameSpy	2/5	2/5	2/5
GameZone	7.5/10	8.9/10	8.3/10
IGN	7.2/10	7.4/10	7.6/10
Nintendo Power	3.3/5	N/A	N/A
Nintendo World Report	7.5/10	N/A	N/A
Official U.S. PlayStation Magazine	N/A	2/5	N/A
Official Xbox Magazine (US)	N/A	N/A	7.9/10
X-Play	N/A	N/A	3/5
Maxim	8/10	8/10	8/10

Vexx received "mixed reviews" on all platforms according to video game review aggregator Metacritic. It is regarded by critics as a typical platform game that excels in previously established rules of the genre while doing little to expand the premise. Ryan Davis of GameSpot praised the game for its variety of tasks and its combat system but criticized it for its weak story, lack of innovation, and poor design. Hilary Goldstein of IGN praised the variety of tasks and the platforming aspects of the game while criticizing the lack of interesting enemies and the static nature of the character's abilities. Kristan Reed of Eurogamer gave the PlayStation 2 version a poor review, harshly criticizing the game for retreading previous platform games without meeting the standards set by previous entries. Fennec Fox of GamePro said of the Xbox version, "With some polish (and a better soundtrack), Vexx could take on the top of the heap; as it is, it already beats all of last year's second-tier platformers." (Note: GamePro gave the Xbox version 4/5 for graphics, 3/5 for sound, and two 3.5/5 scores for control and fun factor.)
