= Super Play =

British video game magazine

- Cover of the first issue of Super Play by Wil Overton
- Former editors: Tony Mott (September 2017); Alison Harper (Apr 95 - Sep 96); James Leach (Oct 93 - Mar 95); Matt Bielby (Nov 92 - Sep 93)
- Categories: Nintendo video games
- Frequency: Monthly
- Circulation: 23,657 (Nov 95); 37,747 (May 95); 37,442 (Dec 94); 50,578 (Jun 94); 50,504 (Nov 93)
- Publisher: Future Publishing
- First issue: November 1992
- Final issue Number: September 2017; 48
- Country: United Kingdom
- Based in: Bath
- Language: English
- ISSN: 0966-6192

Super Play was a British Super Nintendo Entertainment System (SNES) magazine which ran from 1 October 1992 to September 1996.

== Overview ==
Super Play covered in great detail the role-playing video game genre. Many of these games were never released officially in the UK or European games market, and therefore the magazine concentrated much effort in covering aspects of the American, and moreover the Japanese games markets.

Given the close ties between the world of Japanese console RPGs and animation, the magazine also heavily featured information about manga and anime by noted UK-based writer Helen McCarthy. It can be said that Super Play was one of the magazines that helped to push forward what was at the time a nascent market for anime in the UK. In this vein, the magazine itself was also notable as its cover illustrations (and many illustrations between the covers) were done in a manga-influenced style by artist Wil Overton. Overton also caricatured many of the staff in chibi form, wearing various types of anime-related costumes - sci-fi armour, flying gear, RPG-style armour etc. The cover even had the name "Super Play" written in katakana.

== Logo ==
The logo for the magazine was designed by Jez Bridgeman in his first week on the magazine before the Art Editor arrived in the September before launch and at the last minute the 'PLAY' part of the logo was switched for a sans serif font and then stretched to fit the space.

== Publication schedule and staff ==
The magazine was published monthly, and would regularly feature a monthly Fantasy Quest column about Japanese console RPGs in their native market. In the second half of the publication's life, there was a monthly Final Fantasy Forum dedicated to playing tips and secrets for Square games, even despite the fact that none of the Final Fantasy game series had been released in Europe at that point.

Some of the most recognisable names on the Super Play writing staff were Matt Bielby, Tony Mott (former editor of Future Publishing stablemate Edge), Jason Brookes, Jonathan Davies and Zy Nicholson.

The magazine was based in Bath, England and published by Future Publishing. Despite its fairly short run (47 issues, just short of 4 years, and a one-off "Gold" special in 1993), and many years since its demise, it still enjoys a fan following on the internet.

== Closure ==
Its end came with the declining popularity of the SNES itself, both among games publishers and the game-buying public, as the Nintendo 64 was on the cusp of release, making way for the next generation of video game consoles. Super Play was succeeded in March 1997 by N64 Magazine, which was initially edited by Jonathan Davies with Wil Overton as Art Editor, and frequent contributions by former Super Play writers, although the magazine was much less focused on import gaming and RPGs than its forebear. N64 Magazine in turn was renamed NGC Magazine to coincide with the launch of the GameCube, and after closure of NGC in 2006 the publication was relaunched as NGamer.

== Revival ==
In September 2017, inspired by the announcement of a Super NES Classic Edition, original staff, including Jason Brookes, Jonathan Davies, Tony Mott and Zy Nicholson, along with seasoned Nintendo experts Nathan Brown, Keza MacDonald, Damien McFerran, Jeremy Parish and Chris Schilling, produced a one-off issue 48 of Super Play, which came bundled with Retro Gamer issue 172. Featuring all-new content it consists of the regular sections Super Express, Helen McCarthy's Anime World and a What Cart? guide. Also inside are new reviews of the games included on the SNES Classic, a Star Fox 2 preview and an interview with Dylan Cuthbert, one of the key developers behind the game. Cover art was created by Wil Overton, illustrator of all 48 Super Play covers, with the internal visual style resurrected by Future's senior art editor Warren Brown, who ensured the design will be immediately familiar to fans of the '90s magazine.
