= Proceedings of the Institution of Mechanical Engineers, Part P =

Proceedings of the Institution of Mechanical Engineers, Part P: Journal of Sports Engineering and Technology
- Discipline: Sports engineering
- Language: English
- Edited by: James A Sherwood

Publication details
- History: 2008-present
- Publisher: SAGE Publications (United Kingdom)
- Frequency: Quarterly
- Impact factor: 0.615 (2013)

Standard abbreviations
- ISO 4: Proc. Inst. Mech. Eng. P

Indexing
- ISSN: 1754-3371 (print); 1754-338X (web)
- LCCN: 2008252096
- OCLC no.: 232368099

Links
- Journal homepage; Online access; Online archive

The Proceedings of the Institution of Mechanical Engineers, Part P: Journal of Sports Engineering and Technology is a peer-reviewed scientific journal that covers the development of novel sports apparel, footwear, and equipment; and the materials, instrumentation, and processes that make advances in sports possible. The journal was established in 2008 and is published by SAGE Publications on behalf of the Institution of Mechanical Engineers.

== Abstracting and indexing ==
The journal is abstracted and indexed in Scopus and the Science Citation Index Expanded. According to the Journal Citation Reports, its 2013 impact factor is 0.615.
