= 1726 to 1730 in sports =

Events in world sport through the years 1726 to 1730.

== Boxing ==
Events

- c. 1726 – Jack Broughton begins fighting professional boxing matches in London venues. He defeated several opponents from 1726 to 1732 and became one of the favorites of James Figg.
- 6 June 1727 – James Figg and Gravesend pipe-maker Ned Sutton fight a much-publicised match attended by more than 1,000 spectators.
- May 1730 – James Figg and Ned Sutton fought in two exhibition bouts.

== Cricket ==
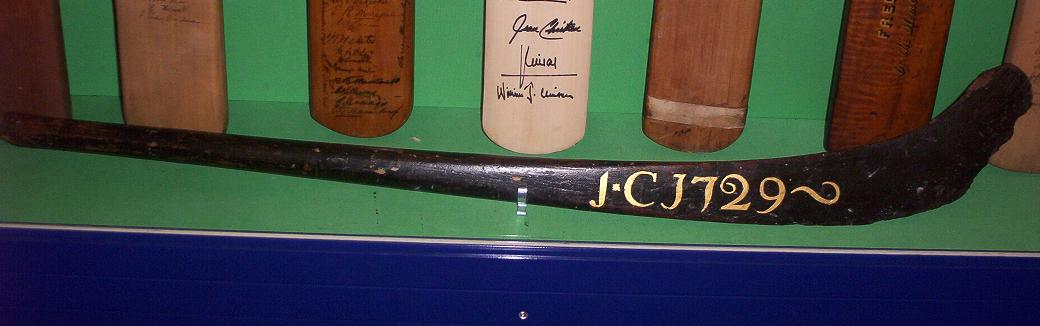
The oldest surviving bat from 1729. Note its "hockey stick" shape, which is very different from modern-day bats.

Events

- 1727 — Charles Lennox, 2nd Duke of Richmond was involved in the creation of Articles of Agreement to establish the rules under which two matches were played, the first time that a set of rules is known to have been put in writing.
- 1728 — the earliest known instance of a county team (i.e., Kent) being acclaimed for its superiority over its rivals suggests the origin of the unofficial Champion County title.
- 1729 — the earliest known innings victory was achieved and 1729 is the date of the oldest known cricket bat still in existence.

== Sources ==
- Bowen, Rowland (1970). Cricket: A History of its Growth and Development. Eyre & Spottiswoode.
- Buckley, G. B. (1935). Fresh Light on 18th Century Cricket. Cotterell.
- Maun, Ian (2009). From Commons to Lord's, Volume One: 1700 to 1750. Roger Heavens. ISBN 978-1-900592-52-9.
- McCann, Tim (2004). Sussex Cricket in the Eighteenth Century. Sussex Record Society.
- Waghorn, H. T. (1906). The Dawn of Cricket. Electric Press.
