= Men's Fitness (British magazine) =

British fitness magazine

Men's Fitness (UK)
- Categories: Fitness, health, nutrition, sports, outdoors
- Frequency: 12 issues per year
- Circulation: 25,807 (ABC Jul–Dec 2016); Print and digital editions.
- Publisher: Kelsey Media
- Founded: 2001
- Based in: London, England
- Language: English
- Website: www.mensfitness.co.uk

Men's Fitness (UK) is a monthly men's magazine specialising in health and fitness and published by Kelsey Media in the UK and Ireland. It was started in 2001.

== Slogan ==
The magazine's slogan is "Fit For Life", and it targets men of all ages, featuring the latest tips, advice and information on training, nutrition, muscle-building, weight loss, and sports performance, as well as sex tips, grooming advice, celebrity interviews, and in-depth features and analysis on the core and emerging health and fitness trends.

In 2009 Dennis Publishing acquired control of the complete publishing rights for Men’s Fitness in the UK and Ireland. The magazine was previously published under licence from American Media, Inc. Dennis has also published a number of books under the Men's Fitness brand, known as MagBooks, including the Amazon UK best-seller 12 Week Body Plan by then deputy editor Joe Warner and personal trainer Nick Mitchell. In 2013 the magazine launched an interactive edition.

== Editors ==
Its editors have included Pete Muir (currently editor of cycling magazine Cyclist), Jon Lipsey and Warner, who together set up the digital fitness publishing company IronLife in 2014, and Joe Barnes, who had formerly been editor of FHM and Front. Other members of staff have included erstwhile children's author and games journalist Joel Snape, who was features editor and later associate editor.

A former deputy editor, Andy Dixon, is editor of Runner's World in the UK and another, Michael Donlevy, was editor of the UK edition of Maxim before its closure in 2009.

== Art directors ==
Art directors included Will Jack, who worked with Barnes at FHM and Front as well as on Sport and is now at Men's Health, and former Daily Mail Weekend Magazine art director Ped Millichamp.

In 2019 Dennis sold the title to Kent-based Kelsey Media. The current editor is Isaac Williams.

== See also ==
- Men's Fitness
- Muscle & Fitness
