= Acclaim Entertainment =

American video game publisher

Acclaim Entertainment, Inc.
- Type: Public
- Traded as: Nasdaq: AKLM (pre-2004); OTC Pink: AKLMQ (2004)
- Industry: Video games
- Founded: 1987; 39 years ago in Oyster Bay, New York, U.S.
- Founders: Greg Fischbach; Robert Holmes; Jim Scoroposki
- Defunct: September 1, 2004; 22 years ago
- Fate: Chapter 7 bankruptcy
- Headquarters: Glen Cove, New York, U.S.
- Area served: Worldwide
- Key people: Rodney Cousens (CEO); Gerard Agoglia (CFO)
- Products: Burnout series; (2001–2002); NBA Jam series; Turok series
- Brands: AKA Acclaim (formerly Acclaim Max Sports); Club Acclaim; Acclaim Sports
- Number of employees: 585 (2004)
- Subsidiaries: See § Subsidiaries
- Website: acclaim.com (archived)

Acclaim Entertainment, Inc. was an American video game publisher based in Glen Cove, New York. Originally founded by Greg Fischbach, Robert Holmes, and Jim Scoroposki from a storefront in Oyster Bay in 1987, the company built a global development team through a series of acquisitions during the late 1990s and early 2000s.

Following disappointing financial results in its 2003 fiscal year, Acclaim filed for Chapter 7 bankruptcy on September 1, 2004. The properties owned by Acclaim were subsequently auctioned off to various parties, most notably Howard Marks, a former Activision CEO, launched Acclaim Games which continued to exist until 2010 when Playdom acquired and closed the company. A group of investors launched a new company using the Acclaim trademark in 2025.

== History ==
=== 1987–1990: Founding ===
In the early 1980s, Greg Fischbach was employed by the American video game company Activision, where he worked alongside Robert Holmes and Jim Scoroposki. After leaving Activision, he joined RCA Records, which was subsequently acquired by Bertelsmann, leaving Fischbach unemployed. In 1987, he met with Scoroposki in Oyster Bay, where Scoroposki owned a sales rep company, to discuss a potential joint venture. After Scoroposki suggested that they re-enter the video game industry, they contacted Holmes to join them, and the three co-founded Acclaim Entertainment. Acclaim did not secure any venture financing and was entirely financed by Fischbach and Scoroposki. In its early years, Acclaim operated exclusively as a video game publisher, either outsourcing the development of its video games to external developers or localizing existing titles from overseas. However, as the company expanded, it acquired several independent studios, including Iguana Entertainment of Austin, Texas; Probe Entertainment of London, England; and Sculptured Software of Salt Lake City, Utah.

The company's name was chosen to ensure it was alphabetically positioned above its co-founder's former employer, Activision, as well as above Accolade, another company established by former Activision employees. This naming convention was a common practice among new companies founded by ex-Activision employees, as the founders of Activision had similarly adopted this strategy when they left Atari.

Many of Acclaim's products featured licenses from popular comics, television series, and movies. Fischbach noted that during the late 1980s and early 1990s, the video game market was less discerning, with specialized gaming publications exerting minimal influence on consumer opinion. Consequently, leveraging a popular license became one of the few reliable strategies to persuade retailers to stock a game. In its early years, the company entered into an agreement with Interactive VCR Games Inc., whose bestsellers included NFL Quarterback, to produce interactive VCR games, as well as expand into the handheld game market. Acclaim was also responsible for porting many of Midway's arcade games in the early to mid-1990s, including the Mortal Kombat series. Additionally, it published several games from companies that, at the time of publication, did not have an American branch, such as Technōs Japan's Double Dragon II: The Revenge and Taito's Bust-a-Move series.

=== 1990–2004: Success ===
In 1990, the company signed a five-year deal with WMS Industries where Acclaim handled home console rights to WMS' arcade titles from the brands of Williams Electronics Games and Midway Manufacturing Company, with a right of first refusal option. In 1990, Acclaim partnered with TV producer Saban Entertainment and distributor Bohbot Entertainment to launch Video Power, which subsequently premiered in the fall of 1990. In early 1992, the company acquired Mirrorsoft, a British game developer who owns the Arena Entertainment and Image Works labels. Around the same time, the company introduced the Flying Edge label for Sega games.

In December 1993, Acclaim signed a distribution deal with the European Spanish branch of Buena Vista Home Video, allowing the company to distribute its titles in Spain.

In May 1994, Tom Petit, former president of Sega Enterprises USA, who had worked at Sega for nine years, became the president of Acclaim's coin-op division. In May 1994, the company dropped the Flying Edge and Arena Entertainment brand names in favor of Acclaim, as its branding was adopted on Sega games, and the LJN brand was soon later dropped.

Throughout much of the 1990s, Acclaim was one of the most successful publishers of console video games in the world. In the financial year ending August 1994, the company reported a profit of $481 million, which rose to $585 million the following year. Franchises such as Mortal Kombat, NBA Jam, and NFL Quarterback Club served as reliable cash cows for Acclaim. Acclaim's expansion continued with the signing of a relationship with Marvel Entertainment Group, wherein Acclaim managed the video game licenses for some of Marvel's comic book properties. Later that year, the company acquired a minority interest in the FMV gaming studio Digital Pictures and began releasing its titles through Acclaim Distribution.

In 1995, the company acquired Sculptured Software, Iguana Entertainment, and Probe Entertainment, with these entities transitioning to the first-party development studio known as Acclaim Studios from 1999 to 2004. Acclaim's gaming business further expanded with the acquisition of exclusive rights to publish Taito's games in the Western Hemisphere. The company also constructed a motion capture studio at its headquarters, making it the first video game company to have an in-house motion capture studio.

A less prominent aspect of Acclaim's business was the development and publication of strategy guides related to its software products, along with the issuance of "special edition" comic magazines via Acclaim Comics to support its more lucrative brand names. Additionally, it created the ASF/AMC motion capture format, which remains in use in the industry today.

Acclaim enjoyed a long-standing relationship with the World Wrestling Federation (WWF) that dates back to 1988's WWF WrestleMania. However, after failing to replicate the success of World Championship Wrestling (WCW)'s THQ/AKI games during the Monday Night Wars, the WWF announced in April 1998 that it would not renew its deal with Acclaim, opting instead to sign a joint-publishing agreement with Jakks Pacific and THQ after WCW's contract with the latter publisher expired and signed a deal with rival Electronic Arts.

Acclaim closed its coin-op division in early 1998, transferring the key personnel and resources to its New York development studios.

In October 1999, Acclaim signed a contract with Extreme Championship Wrestling (ECW) to publish video games based on the promotion. Under this agreement, Acclaim released two video games until ECW declared bankruptcy in 2001, leaving the promotion still owing Acclaim money. The game publisher subsequently released three wrestling titles under the Legends of Wrestling banner during its final years.

=== 2004: Decline and bankruptcy ===
Acclaim faced significant financial difficulties in 2004, primarily due to poor sales of its video game titles. This situation led to the closure of Acclaim Studios Cheltenham and Acclaim Studios Manchester in England, along with other locations, and resulted in its filing for Chapter 11 bankruptcy protection, leaving many employees unpaid. Among the titles under development at the UK studios were Emergency Mayhem, ATV Quad Power Racing 3, The Last Job, Interview with a Made Man, and Kung Faux.

In May 2004, it was announced that Major League Baseball had revoked its licensing agreement with Acclaim for the All-Star Baseball franchise due to a failure to make royalty payments. The following month, in June, Turok owners Classic Media announced that it had terminated Acclaim's video game rights to the franchise, also due to non-payment of royalties.

When Acclaim's agreement with GMAC Commercial Finance, its primary lender, expired on August 20, 2004, the company closed all of its facilities on August 27. This closure resulted in the termination of all employees at the Austin and New York studios. Prior to the closures, Acclaim employed 585 staff worldwide as of March 31, 2004. On August 30, Acclaim announced its intention to file for bankruptcy, officially filing for Chapter 7 bankruptcy with the United States bankruptcy court in Central Islip, New York on September 1.

In September 2005, a complaint filed in the same court sought to hold the company's founders, including Fischbach and Scorposki, and several executives accountable for Acclaim's financial losses shortly before the bankruptcy filing, seeking $150 million in damages.

=== Asset selling ===
On October 1, 2004, Rod Cousens acquired the former Acclaim Studios Cheltenham and Acclaim Studios Manchester development studios, along with several of its unfinished projects. Cousens sought to reopen the studios under a new publisher provisionally named "Exclaim" on October 11, but his efforts were hindered by a lawsuit and legal disputes over Acclaim's intellectual property, with both US and UK administrators asserting their claims.

Following interested offers from Take Two Interactive, it was announced on October 8 that THQ had acquired the worldwide publishing rights to Juiced.

In November 2004, Acclaim's headquarters were sold to Anthony Pistilli of Pistilli Realty Group for $6 million.

On April 20, 2005, Fund4Games announced that Acclaim's upcoming European titles had been sold to them, with Interview with a Made Man and ATV Quad Power Racing 3 being returned to development at the Manchester studios, which were reopened by Fund4Games under the name Silverback Studios. In June 2006, Mastertronic announced that it had acquired the publishing rights to Made Man in Europe.

The Dave Mirra Freestyle BMX and ATV: Quad Power Racing franchises were sold to Crave Entertainment in July 2005.

In August 2005, former Activision executive Howard Marks acquired the Acclaim brand and logo for a reported $100,000. At the beginning of 2006, Marks established a new company named Acclaim Games. According to a job listing for the company, Acclaim Games targeted the US and UK preteen multiplayer markets. However, the second iteration of Acclaim struggled due to connectivity and payment issues for its online games, as well as a lack of action against dishonest players, earning this iteration an "F" grade from the Los Angeles/Southern California Better Business Bureau.

In 2006, Throwback Entertainment acquired more than 50 of Acclaim's games and committed to bringing titles such as Re-Volt, Extreme-G, Gladiator: Sword of Vengeance, Vexx, Fur Fighters, and many other franchises into the next generation and beyond.

In March 2007, budget publisher XS Games acquired the publishing rights to The Red Star, with Take-Two Interactive managing European distribution. In April 2007, Warner Bros. Interactive Entertainment, then the North American distributor for Codemasters' products, announced that the British publisher had acquired the rights to Emergency Mayhem.

In July 2010, the South Korean-based company We Go Interactive acquired Re-Volt, RC Revenge, and RC De Go! (developed and owned by Taito) from Throwback.

In October 2015, Gregarious Games, LLC were reported to be the current owners of the Acclaim trademark. In May 2016, the Acclaim brand was acquired by Collectorvision, an independent game developer, publisher, and manufacturer.

In October 2018, Liquid Media Group purchased 65 former Acclaim titles from Throwback for $1 million. This acquisition primarily included installments in the NBA Jam, AFL Live, All-Star Baseball, and NFL Quarterback Club franchises, as well as games from Japanese developer Taito that Acclaim had published outside of Japan.

=== 2025 revival (as Acclaim, Inc. "PlayAcclaim") ===
On March 4, 2025, it was announced that a group of executives purchased the Acclaim trademark and would relaunch Acclaim Entertainment as an indie publisher and potentially purchase former Acclaim IP.

The company, Acclaim, Inc., is led by Russell Binder, Mark Caplan and wrestler Jeff Jarrett, while Graffiti Games CEO Alex Josef was appointed as Acclaim's new CEO.

On September 10, 2025, the revived company announced a slate of nine indie games, during its newly described, "Play Acclaim Showcase". During the showcase, Acclaim, Inc. announced that two of its nine titles, Katanaut, an all-new sci-fi samurai action platformer, was made immediately available for PC, and Basketball Classics, a retro-style basketball game developed by Namo Gamo, were made immediately available for PC, with Basketball Classics also coming soon to home consoles.

== Controversies ==
During Acclaim's decline towards bankruptcy, the company made several controversial business and marketing decisions in the United Kingdom. One notable example was a promise to award a US$10,000 (£6,000) prize to UK parents who named their baby "Turok" to promote the release of Turok: Evolution. A subsequent investigation by VG247 revealed that all those who had reportedly changed their names were actors. Another controversial initiative involved an attempt to purchase advertising space on tombstones for Shadow Man: 2econd Coming. To promote Burnout 2: Point of Impact, Acclaim offered to reimburse any driver in the United Kingdom who received a speeding ticket. However, following negative reactions from the UK government, the plan was ultimately canceled.

In the United States, Acclaim faced multiple lawsuits, several of which involved former partners. Mary-Kate and Ashley Olsen sued over unpaid royalties. Another lawsuit was brought by Acclaim's own investors, who claimed that Acclaim management had published misleading financial reports.

In the final iteration of the BMX series, BMX XXX, nudity and semi-nudity (including full motion video of strippers and nude female riders) were incorporated in an attempt to boost sales. However, like most of Acclaim's video games during the company's final years, BMX XXX sold poorly and was criticized for its sexual content and subpar gameplay. Dave Mirra publicly disowned the game, stating that he had no involvement in the decision to include nudity, and he subsequently sued Acclaim out of concern for being associated with BMX XXX.

In 1997, two years after its acquisition of Sculptured Software, Acclaim terminated approximately half of the staff at the Salt Lake City studio, violating the terms of the contracts it had provided to employees, which appeared to be iron-clad and included stock that would vest over the contract period. The layoffs were abrupt, forcing employees to choose between accepting a severance package (the terms of which changed multiple times during the initial weeks after the layoff) and foregoing the right to sue, or joining other creditors in litigation, thereby losing their severance packages. In 2007, one of several class action suits filed on behalf of stockholders was won, enabling some employees to recover a portion of the stock that had vested.
