= NGC Magazine =

British magazine

- Cover of November 2001 issue
- Former editors: Jonathan Davies: issues 1–12; James Ashton: issues 13–27; Tim Weaver: issues 28–41; Andrea Ball: issues 42–56; Mark Green: issues 57–59; Tim Weaver: issues 60–72; Jes Bickham: issues 73–84; Marcus Hawkins: issues 85–103; Tom East: issues 104–116; Martin Kitts: issues 117–120
- Categories: Video games
- Frequency: Monthly
- First issue: April 1997; 29 years ago (as N64 Magazine)
- Final issue Number: June 2006; 120
- Company: Future plc
- Country: United Kingdom
- Based in: Bath, England
- Website: gamesradar.com
- ISSN: 1475-584X

NGC Magazine (N64 Magazine until October 2001, issue 59) was a British magazine specialising in Nintendo video game consoles and software. It was first printed in 1997 and ran until 2006. It was the successor to Super Play, a magazine that ended in September 1996. Many of the staff and the style of that publication persisted at N64 Magazine. In November 2000, N64 Magazine merged with Nintendo World, a magazine that was published by the same company, Future plc. NGC Magazine ceased publication in 2006. Its successor, NGamer, was renamed Nintendo Gamer in January 2012, until publishing its final issue the following September.

NGC Magazine was at the time of its closure one of the longest-running gaming magazines in the UK. It was on many occasions first for news (including the 'denied by official source' rumors such as the existence of Resident Evil Deadly Silence and the implication of the Wii controller and the delay of Zelda: Twilight Princess – both later being proved true in parts), due in part to having no official connection to Nintendo and therefore no restrictions on what it could report (save legal ones).

== Staff ==
The staff of NGC Magazine varied over the years. Memorable staff members included Jonathan Davies, James Ashton, Jes Bickham, Dan Geary, Tim Weaver, Wil Overton, Mark 'Greener' Green, Martin 'Kittsy' Kitts, Andrea Ball, Dr Mark Cousens, Zy Nicholson, Geraint Evans, Justin Webb, Miriam 'Mim' McDonald, Steve Jalim and Paul 'Shedwards' Edwards.

The magazine took usual light-hearted digs at each of its own staff; Jes was regularly lampooned due to his bald head; Mark Green had an evil alter-ego named Dark Mark; Andrea Ball was apparently permanently covered in grease and fake tan, and also had a reputation for carrying a constantly trademarked "Big Stick™"; Dr Mark Cousens was mocked for his apparent lack of a Nintendo Entertainment System console; Tim Weaver was famed for his patented Emotionless Stare; and James Ashton was ridiculed mercilessly in the magazine's pages for continually failing to pass his driving test. To this very day, he drives his Ferraris on a provisional license. Geraint was often also the subject of jokes, due to his Welsh origins, with regular pokes at him and his culture and lifestyle.

== Thematic humour ==
The many popular, satirical, running gags revolved around:

- Nintendo executive and design staff – Shigeru Miyamoto (most commonly referred to by NGC as 'Shigsy'), Hiroshi Yamauchi (NCL's former President, who the magazine regularly called absolutely terrifying), Satoru Iwata, David Gosen (former CEO of Nintendo of Europe – the magazine claimed he was a homicidal robot named "Go-Sen" who would always say "This year is a good year to buy a [insert Nintendo product or calendar]"), and Reggie Fils-Aimé (referred to as a frightening man ogre who could crush you with his bare hands – in one issue a cut-out cat mask adorned with Reggie's face was included in the magazine to frighten other cats).
- Having the readers send in weird things to win stuff: Luigi papier-mache statues, photos of people dressed up as game characters, and pieces of alternative wisdom known as 'Sense Talks'. One famous competition asked readers to send in "tat" of their own in exchange for over £1000s worth of tat from the N64 offices. Among the N64 tat was a life-sized cardboard cut-out of Turok, star of several N64 games, along with two wigs that apparently belonged to Jes Bickham: the caption read "Make no mistake: when you see Jes striding down the street in his size threes wearing these hairpieces, you know he means business". This competition was repeated when NGC later reached its final issue.
- Random nonsense on popular love/hate-relationship characters: Toad, Luigi, Sonic, Tingle, Diddy Kong, Krystal, Lex Luthor, Yoshi, Kirby, Jango Fett, and Jar Jar Binks.
- 'Bonus Letters' (nonsensical sentences picked out of letters which are not entirely printed). This could also include the titles at the top of fully printed letters, which took certain amusing words from the body of the letter and printed them in large, bold text to draw the reader's attention. This tradition, and the one above, have been continued in NGC's successor Nintendo Gamer (formerly NGamer).
- Made-up and ridiculous words such as "blork", "grackler", "interweb", and "wah!". "Grackler" is particularly infamous; in response to a competition in issue 16 ("send us something you think will scare us witless"), a ghost story was received, part of which read "one nit when i was sleppin a grackler cam" (sic). The entire sentence (and later, the word "grackler" alone) became part of N64 tradition, and it was eventually decided that the term should be used as a noun when referring to an exceptionally ugly person. For example, when the football game FIFA 99 was reviewed, a picture reference was made to the extremely horrible texture-mapping on the players' faces, with the caption "Grackle Vision, Gr-Grackle Vision, Grackle-Grackle Vision," in reference to the popular UK children's TV show ChuckleVision. "Wah!" is based on Wario's exclamation upon being hit by a shell in Mario Kart 64.

== Wil "FuSoYa™" Overton ==
Wil Overton was the magazine's chief artist (until issue 42) and was held in a somewhat reverential light by several of the magazine's readers; this could possibly have been brought about because some of the magazine's readers had followed him from Super Play magazine. Overton came in for much more than his fair share of insults and jokes, but he was part of the reason that N64 Magazine stood out so much on the shelves: his manga-styled cover art was unique compared to the other magazines, and his experience, love for RPGs and generally somewhat eccentric nature were comforting for many hardcore gamers.

As a measure of this eccentricity, he was also known by the pseudonym "FuSoYa™". FuSoYa was a wizard character from the game Final Fantasy IV. Overton, a devotee of Final Fantasy, added a ™ symbol to the character's name, and a legend was born: FuSoYa™, his "beardy, RPG-loving alter-ego", as N64 Magazine described him. FuSoYa™ appeared sporadically, sometimes to promote a competition, other times in response to queries in the magazine's letters section; his monstrous visage (actually Overton in a cheap wizard outfit and very unconvincing fake beard) was a comforting sight to many.

Overton eventually moved to Rare, where he worked as an artist for several years. He later returned to do some character design artwork for NGamer, including the cover of the final ever issue.

== Regular features ==
NGC's recurring features included:

- End64/GC: A random page signifying the end of the magazine. Typically featured abstract Nintendo-related subjects. Examples included a fake magazine article of Lara Croft Vs Joanna Dark, a Nintendo Internet forum with fanboyish morons, and a newspaper obituary for the Nintendo 64.
- I'm the Best: A league for readers competing against each other in N64 challenges.
- Grintendo: A small joke section whereupon a reader's (usually abysmal) joke is put to test against the Team, movie stars, and Pikmin.

== Top scored games ==
These are the top games that the magazine rated where the 100-point system was used. Ratings reflected are the last printed in N64/NGC Magazine before it finished (GameCube and DS games were re-rated for the first issue of Nintendo Gamer, NGC's successor).

Score	Games
98%	The Legend of Zelda: Ocarina of Time (N64) – Issue 24
97%	Resident Evil 4 (GameCube) – Issue 104; The Legend of Zelda: The Wind Waker (GameCube) – Issue 81; Metroid Prime (GameCube) – Issue 79
96%	Super Mario 64 (N64) – Issue 1 Perfect Dark (N64) – Issue 42; Super Mario Sunshine (GameCube) – Issue 71; The Legend of Zelda: Majora's Mask (N64) – Issue 49 (previous score: 95% in Issue 48)
95%	Turok 2: Seeds of Evil (N64) – Issue 21; Advance Wars (GBA) – Issue 61 (previous scores: 5/5, 96%); Advance Wars: Dual Strike (DS) – Issue 110
94%	GoldenEye 007 (N64) – Issue 9 Metroid Prime 2: Echoes (GameCube) – Issue 101; Golden Sun (GBA) (previous score: 4/5 in Issue 64); Mario Kart DS (DS) – Issue 114 (previous score: 5/5); Super Mario World: Super Mario Advance 2 (GBA) – Issue 64 (previous scores: 5/5, 95%)
93%	Mario Kart: Double Dash (GameCube) – Issue 88; Donkey Kong 64 (N64) – Issue 36; F-1 World Grand Prix (N64) – Issue 20; Jet Force Gemini (N64) – Issue 34; Shadow Man (N64) – Issue 32; Mario Kart: Super Circuit (GBA) – Issue 59 (previous scores: 5/5, 95%)

For two stints, first from 1999 to 2002 and then all issues dated 2005, the Magazine ran a 5 out of 5 scoring system for portable games. This list is all games which scored the perfect five, and thus do not fit in well with the above list.

Score	Games
5/5	Sonic Rush (DS) – Issue 114; Kirby: Power Paintbrush (DS) – Issue 113; Gunstar Future Heroes (GBA) – Issue 113; Nintendogs (DS) – Issue 112; Osu! Tatakae! Ouendan (DS) – Issue 112; Meteos (DS) – Issue 108; Wario Ware Twisted! (GBA) – Issue 107; Wario Ware Touched! (DS) – Issue 105; Broken Sword: The Shadow of the Templars (GBA) – Issue 66; Pocket Music (GBA) – Issue 65; Super Mario Advance 2 (GBA) – Issue 64; Doom (GBA) – Issue 62; Wario Land 4 (GBA) – Issue 62; The Legend of Zelda: Oracle of Seasons (GBC) – Issue 57; The Legend of Zelda: Oracle of Ages (GBC) – Issue 57; GT Advance (GBA) – Issue 55; Kuru Kuru Kururin (GBA) – Issue 55; Chu Chu Rocket! (GBA) – Issue 55; F-Zero: Maximum Velocity (GBA) – Issue 55; Pokémon Puzzle Challenge (GBC) – Issue 55; Pokémon Gold and Silver (GBC) – Issue 54; Mario Tennis (GBC) – Issue 51; Kirby Tilt and Tumble (GBC) – Issue 50; Pokémon Trading Card (GBC) – Issue 50; Cannon Fodder (GBC) – Issue 49; Donkey Kong Country (GBC) – Issue 49; Warlocked (GBC) – Issue 48; Legend of the River King 2 – Issue 47; Harvest Moon 2 (GBC) – Issue 47; Pokémon Pinball (GBC) – Issue 47; O'Leary Football Manager 2000 (GBC) – Issue 46; Perfect Dark (GBC) – Issue 45; Pokémon Yellow (GB) – Issue 43; Driver (GBC) – Issue 42; Wario Land: Super Mario Land 3 (GB) – Issue 41 (Retro Review); Metal Gear Solid (GBC) – Issue 41; BC Kid 2 (GB) – Issue 40 (Retro Review); Kirby's Dream Land (GB) – Issue 39 (Retro Review); Balloon Kid (GB) – Issue 39 (Retro Review); Dragon Warrior Monsters (GBC) – Issue 38; Mario Golf (GBC) – Issue 36; Stranded Kids (GBC) – Issue 35; Pokémon Red and Blue (GB) – Issue 33; R-Type DX (GBC) – Issue 32; Legend of the River King (GBC) – Issue 32; Conker's Pocket Tales (GBC) – Issue 31; Super Mario Bros. DX (GBC) – Issue 30; Wario Land 2 (GBC) – Issue 27; Harvest Moon (GBC) – Issue 27; Super Mario Land 2: 6 Golden Coins (GB) – Issue 26 (Retro Review); Tetris DX (GBC) – Issue 26; The Legend of Zelda: Link's Awakening DX (GBC) – Issue 26

== Controversial reviews ==
The magazine handed out some controversial scores in its N64/NGC years, mainly with some fan backlash found in the letters pages. Some examples are:

- WCW vs. nWo: World Tour: 70% (Fans of the game felt that the review of the game was unfair and some speculate the magazine being fans of WWF than WCW – also seen in WCW/nWo Revenge.)
- Mystical Ninja 2 Starring Goemon: 69% (It was common practice at the time for critics like N64 Magazine to bash games that go 2D, thus making reviews like this be frowned upon by gamers today.)
- Star Fox Adventures: 72% (Some thought to be a response to Rare's sale to Microsoft, although this being the reason for the score was denied. NGC humorously gave a 'cut out' 98% sticker later on for people to paste over, as a response to it)
- Sonic Adventure DX: Director's Cut: 38% (Some readers wrote in accusing this of being because of the magazine's hatred of Sonic – also seen in Sonic Adventure 2 and Sonic Heroes reviews, but Sonic Rush, Sonic Riders and Sonic Advance 3 got better grades, 5/5, 75% and 81% respectively. Also, Sonic Mega Collection was placed at #5 on their top 5 Platformers for GameCube.)
- Kirby Air Ride: 51% (Had a couple of minor complaints, but the game was received similarly elsewhere – also people thought it was due to the magazine's 'hatred' of Kirby.)

== The famed "bad reviews" ==
The magazine's reviews of games they considered to be terrible were enjoyed by readers due to the use of comically savage language to more convey the staff's disgust with a particular game – in descending order:

- ClayFighter 63⅓ (N64): 24% - Was described as being "as painful as... having red hot needles shoved into your eyes"; the Top Tip section revealed that "Breaking the cart open reveals several chips of varying thickness. Stack them together to prop up wobbly chairs, etc."
- Cruis'n USA (N64): 24% was described, simply, as "dump".
- Rampage 2: Universal Tour (N64): 22% - Declared an "utterly rancid arcade yawn-fest".
- Trump World (N64): 21% - To give it the full title, "Alice's Waku-Waku Trump World", an unfathomable Alice In Wonderland-themed card game, was deemed "nose-achingly pungent" and "a real Lennie Bennett of a game".
- Wheel Of Fortune (N64): 17% - Another US quiz show port, this was found to be "worse than accidentally falling off a cliff. And surviving".
- Castleween (GameCube): 16% - This platformer's attempt to attract the younger generation of gamers was described via "Although it's aimed squarely at the ultra young market, we can't imagine many small children having the patience to endure an 'entertainment' experience as arduous as this. Not when pushing lolly sticks into dog turds offers so much more long-term excitement, and is a good £40 cheaper".
- Batman of the Future (N64): 16% - A "miserable excuse for a fighting game".
- Batman: Dark Tomorrow (GameCube): 15% - Jes described as "Like having the skin flayed from your fingertips". Later when Batman Begins was mentioned on the cover the magazine asked the rhetorical question: "Can it beat Batman: Dark Tomorrow? Well, it wouldn't be hard..."
- Superman (N64): 14% - was initially viewed as 'an utterly hopeless, consistently appalling leper of a 'game'...bordering on the illegal'. Superman became the butt of all jokes after it was reviewed, and described in Issue 100's hall of shame as 'A game of legendary-so-bad-it's-almost-goodness'. Features the legendary level where Lex Luthor asks Superman to 'solve my maze' which later was a small competition segment in the magazine, the last of which was named "Solve my murder" and had three ways in which Luthor was killed.
- AeroGauge (N64): 10% - Was ridiculed severely, and a "Top Tip" provided with a quick-reference review in the magazine's "index" section read "If you handed over good money for Aero Gauge, 01*** ****** (number censored for privacy) is the number to ring to complain". Further, the sound was described as being "what your TV's mute button was designed for".
- Beyblade (GameCube): 10% - Was referred to as being "scat-encrusted", in the Mastery section it was stated that "the only thing this game has mastered is total crapness" and Kittsy said: "It's rubbish. Really rubbish. Honest, it's crap". In later issues the game's summary within the magazine's review directory read "For £20, we will come to your house and cheesegrater your eyeballs. It's more fun and lasts longer than this frickin' spinning top sim".
- Jeopardy! (N64): 9% A US Import only, was described as "less a game, more a vile disease". Apparently "so ugly that, if you look at it, you'll turn to stone".
- Mortal Kombat Mythologies (N64): 9% - Possibly the most despised game of NGC Magazine's history; the price was stated as "£Too much", the mini-review stated that "This could only be less enjoyable if it squirted sulphuric acid into your face," and the staff's frustration with the game's mechanics was revealed in a tip section: "Creep along in that sideways spider fashion and then GET CRUSHED BY A PILLAR. Place your fist into TV screen".
- Power Rangers Lightspeed Rescue (N64): 9% - Described by Greener as "60 of the most bitterly tedious minutes" of his life. Was also described as "constipated puppet men jerking their way around Lego-built cities".
- Carmageddon 64 (N64): 8% - Was the lowest rated from 1999 until the end of 2004, and was described as "brain-meltingly awful" and "a shocking travesty": players were instructed, if they saw the game in the shops, to "take it off the shelves, rip up the box and throw the cart repeatedly at the wall until it breaks";
- Who Wants to be a Millionaire? Second Edition (GBA): 5% - The worst score in NGC's history. "You'd be better off staying as far away from this lazy slab of plastic as you can. So it's getting 5%. For 'existing'. And that is generous."
- Lego Island 2 The Brickster's Revenge (N64): 3% - "And you think that Clayfighter was bad? Wait til you see this. It is THE worst game on the console, except for a game which actually throws up instantly without any further ado. Avoid like the plague." Top Tip Section: "Press all the directional pad buttons and then LOSE in the rocket ship test, then pull the cartridge out and play baseball with it in place of the ball." The magazine decided to cancel the port in anger.

And, two final honorable mentions:

- Getter Love!! Panda Love Unit (N64): ??% - The strangest game ever reviewed for NGC Magazine, and as such, a score was impossible to award. The decision reached was ??%, and the review read thus: "Impenetrable Japanese girlfriend simulator. No, hang on, that came out all wrong..."
- Giftpia (GameCube): ??% - Awarded the score for the fact that it was so heavy in Japanese that they didn't have a clue what was going on in the game and thus didn't feel they could award a score. However, the review was not unfavourable to the game's graphics and sound, giving them marks of 8 (out of 10) and 7 respectively, and even commenting that "There's clearly a quite brilliant game lurking beneath the realms of the Japanese text".
