= Lithium iridate =

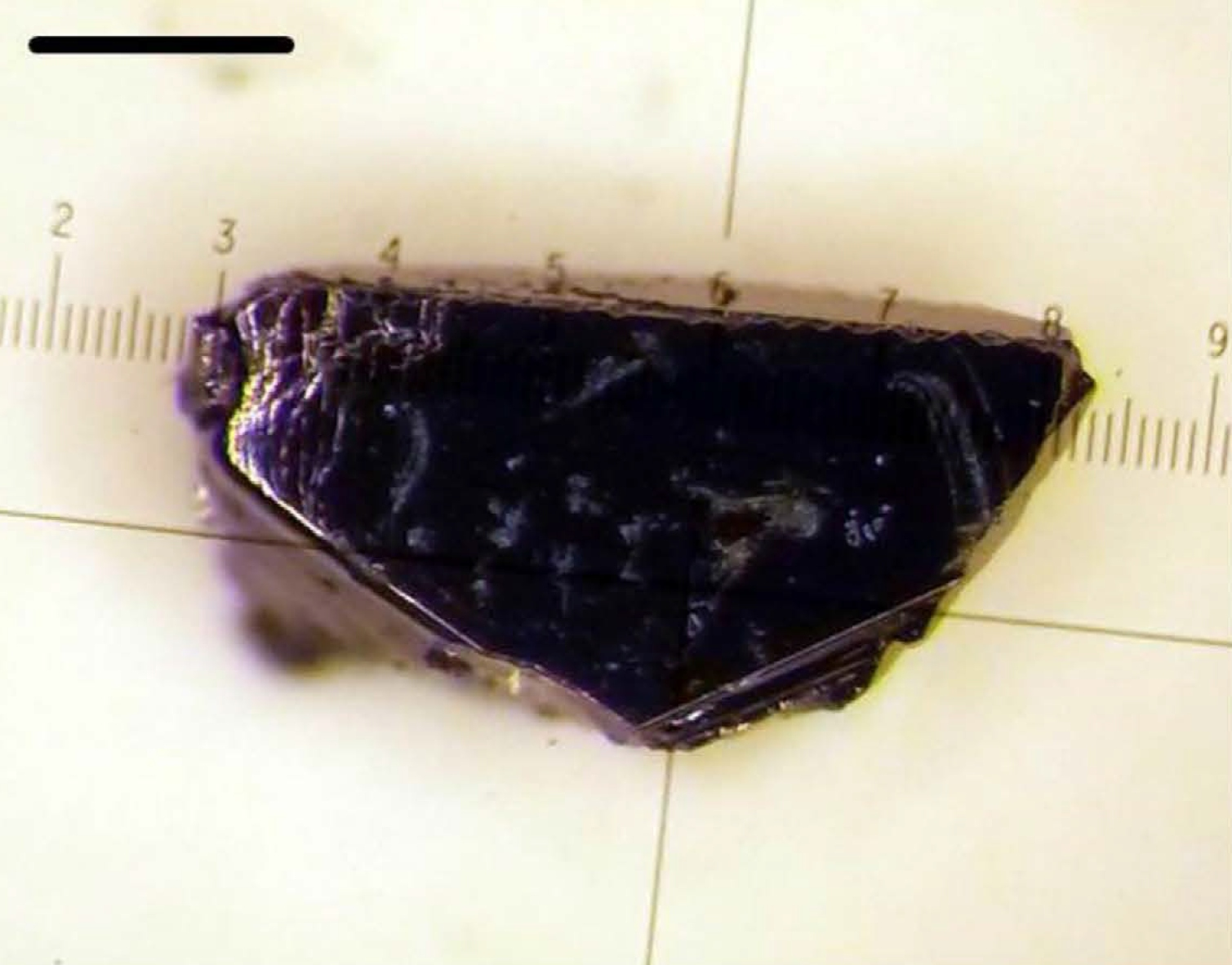
α-Li_{2}IrO_{3} (scale bar 0.3 mm)
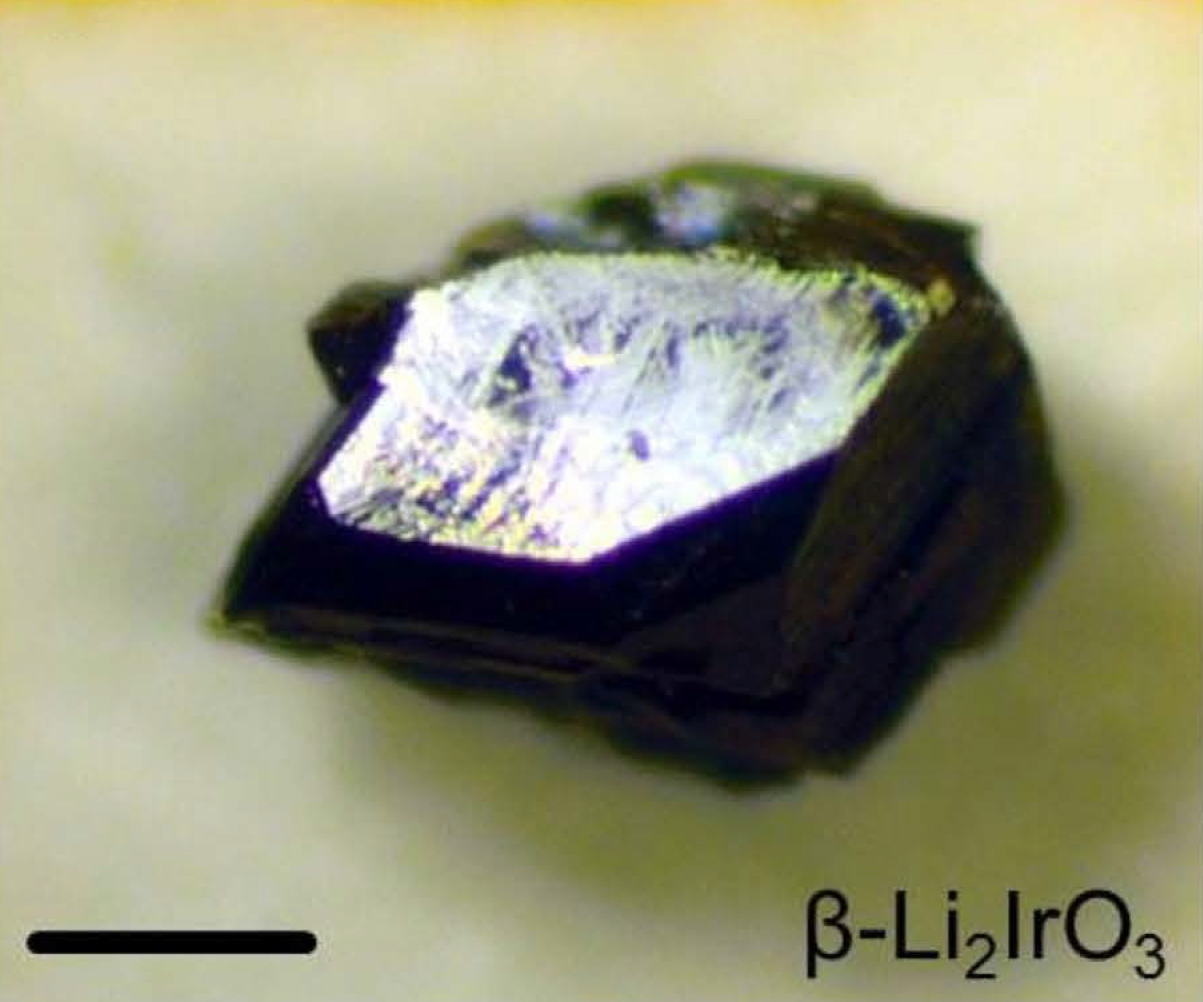
β-Li_{2}IrO_{3} (scale bar 0.2 mm)
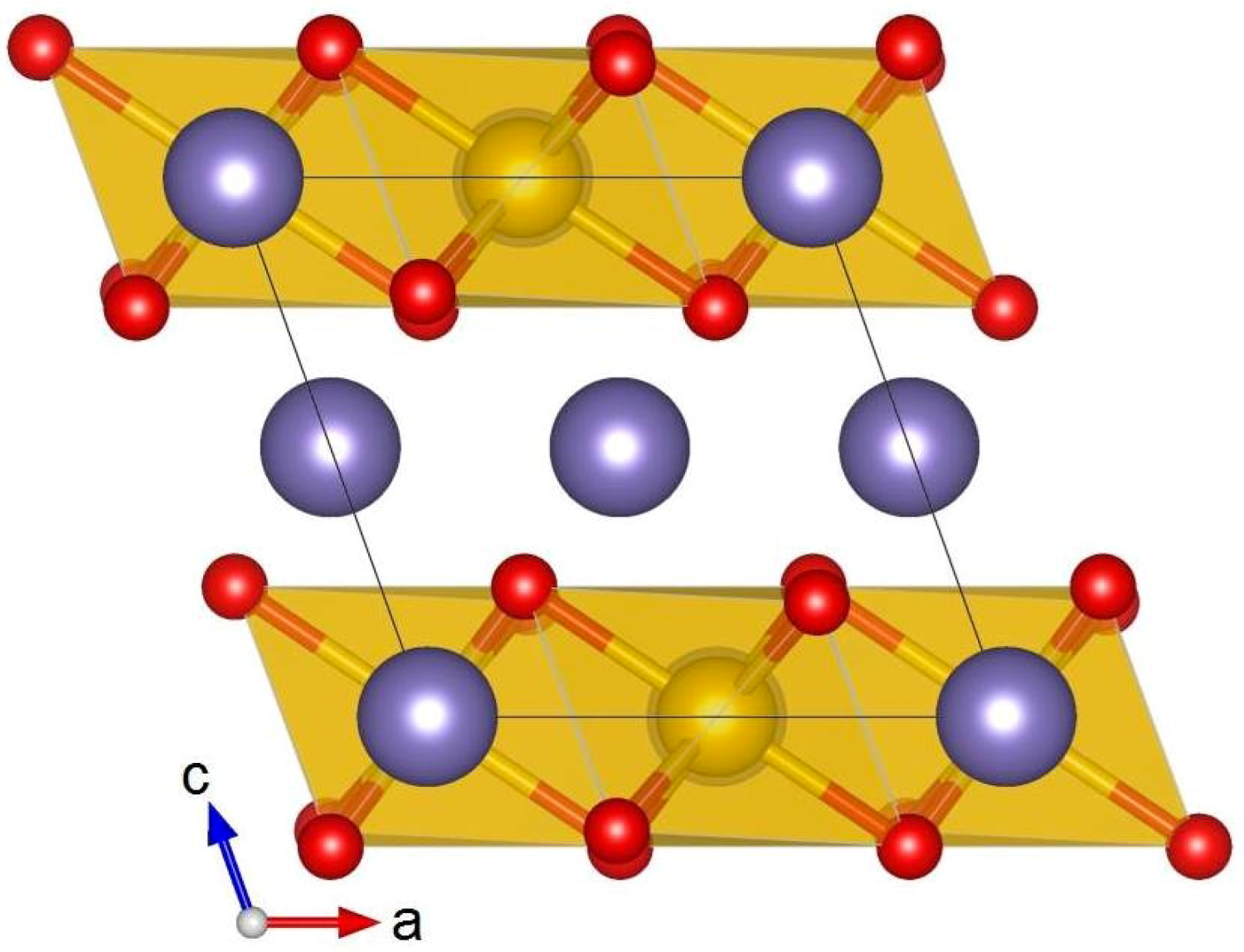

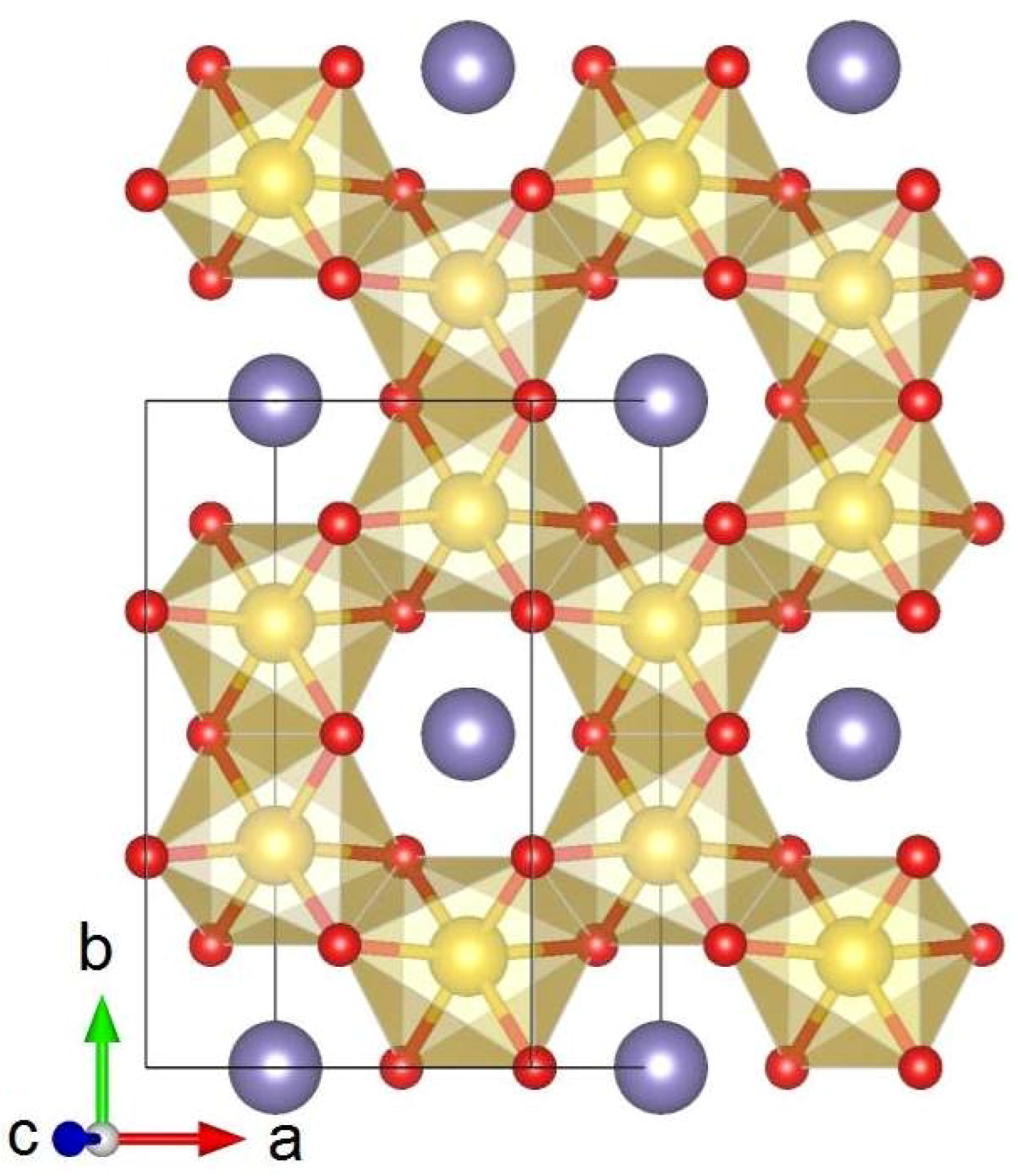
- Crystal structure of α-Li_{2}IrO_{3} with Ir shown in yellow, Li in purple and O in red

Names
- Preferred IUPAC name Lithium iridate

Identifiers
CAS Number	61232-88-0
3D model (JSmol)	Interactive image
- InChI: InChI=1S/Ir.2Li.3O/q;2*+1;;2*-1 Key: QPXMDGCGKRSYMN-UHFFFAOYSA-N
- SMILES: [Li+].[Li+].[O-][Ir](=O)[O-]

Properties
Chemical formula	Li_{2}IrO_{3}
Appearance	Black crystals

Structure
Crystal structure	Monoclinic, C2/m
Lattice constant	a = 5.1633(2) Å, b = 8.9294(3) Å, c = 5.1219(2) Å α = 90°, β = 109.759(3)°, γ = 90°
Formula units (Z)	4

Related compounds
Other anions	Lithium ruthenate, lithium platinate
Other cations	Sodium iridate
- Except where otherwise noted, data are given for materials in their standard state (at 25 °C [77 °F], 100 kPa). (what is ?) Infobox references

Lithium iridate, Li_{2}IrO_{3}, is a chemical compound of lithium, iridium and oxygen. It forms black crystals with three slightly different layered atomic structures, α, β, and sometimes γ. Lithium iridate exhibits metal-like, temperature-independent electrical conductivity, and changes its magnetic ordering from paramagnetic to antiferromagnetic upon cooling to 15 K.

== Properties ==
Lithium iridate is black in color and has a relatively high, temperature-independent electrical conductivity characteristic of metals. Its both α and β phases exhibit the Kitaev exchange coupling between magnetic spins originating from Ir^{4+} ions. These spins form an antiferromagnetic lattice at temperatures below 15 K (Néel temperature, T_{N}), while the material is paramagnetic above T_{N}.

== Structure ==
Li_{2}IrO_{3} typically crystallizes in the α or β phase, and a rare γ phase has been reported. The crystal structure of α-Li_{2}IrO_{3} consists of an alternate stacking of hexagonal Li layers and honeycombs of edge-sharing IrO_{6} octahedra with Li in the center. The offset in adjacent layers results in a relatively low (monoclinic) crystal symmetry. Li_{2}IrO_{3} crystals have abundant twinning defects where the ab crystal planes are rotated by 120° around the c axis.

== Synthesis ==
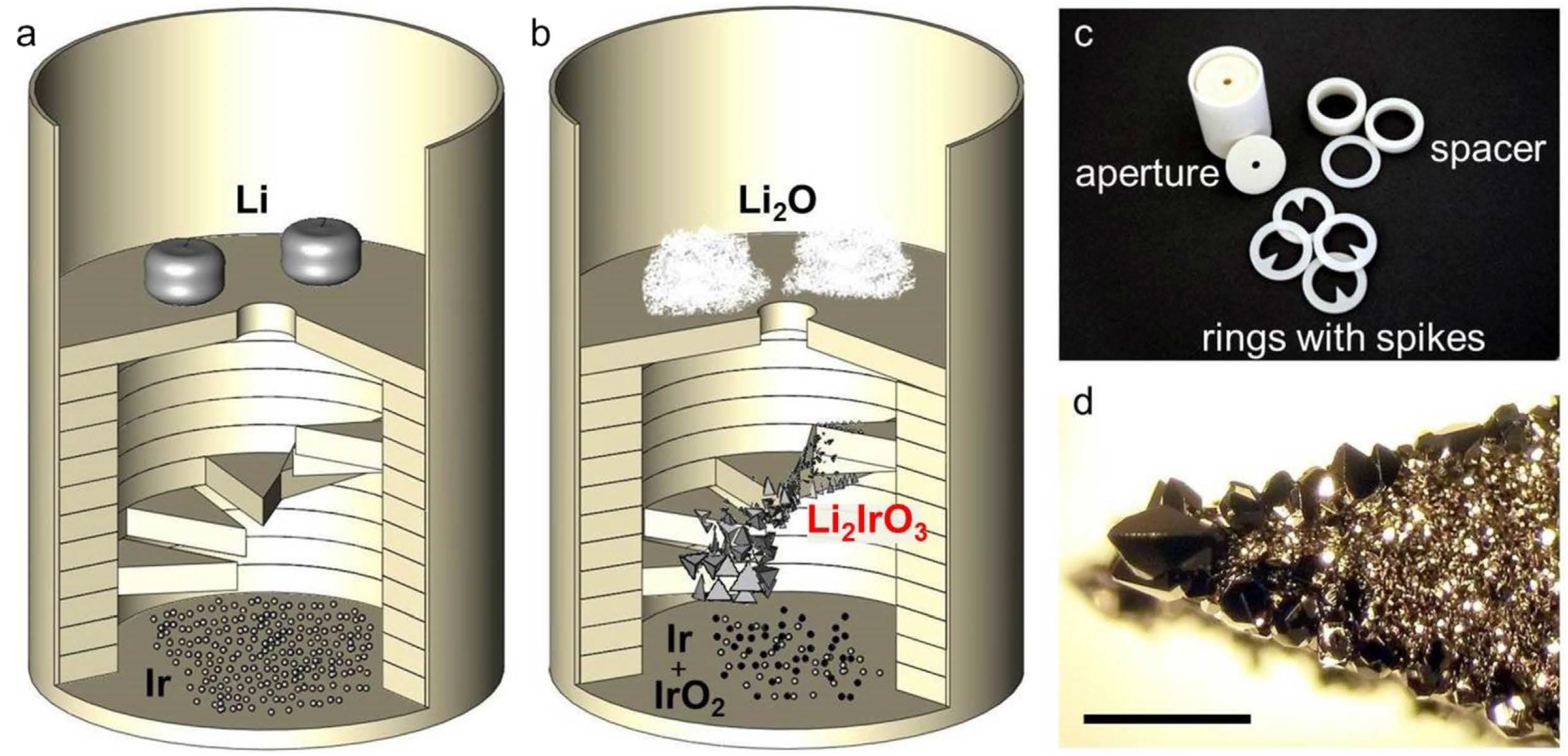
Synthesis of Li_{2}IrO_{3} from Li and Ir metals, which are oxidized during heating. The spiral staircase-like growth chamber allows for nucleation of different crystals at different staircase steps.

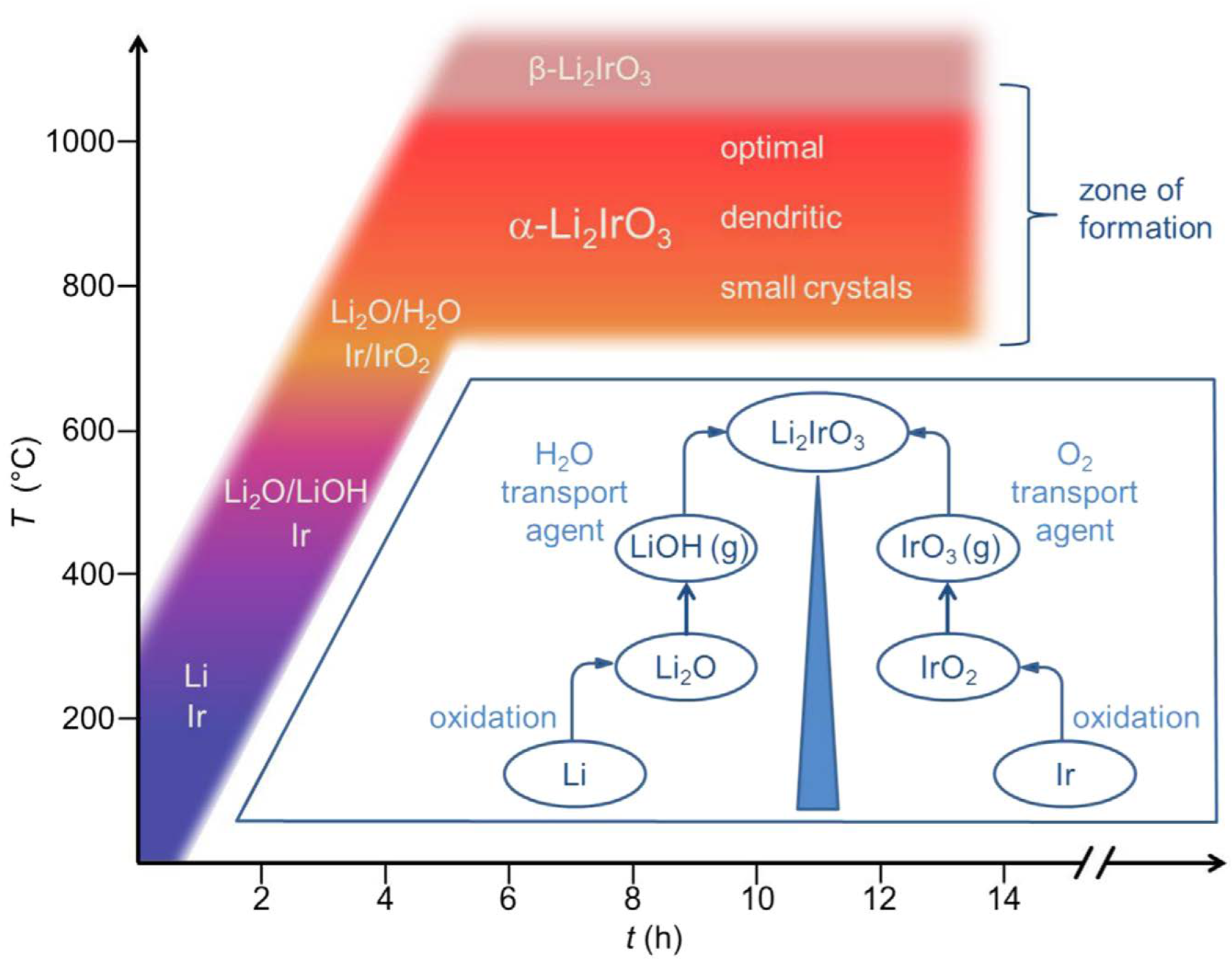
Time-temperature diagram of Li_{2}IrO_{3} synthesis.

Li_{2}IrO_{3} crystals can be grown by direct sintering of Ir and Li metals, which both oxidize during heating in ambient atmosphere. The α phase is formed at 750–1050 °C, while heating to higher temperatures results in the β phase. The use of Li metal instead of more traditional lithium carbonate, which is easier to handle and store, results in larger crystals. The γ phase can be obtained by the calcination of lithium carbonate and iridium(IV) oxide, followed by annealing in molten lithium hydroxide at 700–800 °C.

== Potential applications ==
Lithium iridate is a potential electrode material for the lithium-ion battery. This application is hindered by the high costs of Ir, as compared to the cheaper Li_{2}MnO_{3} alternative.
