= Lithium ruthenate =

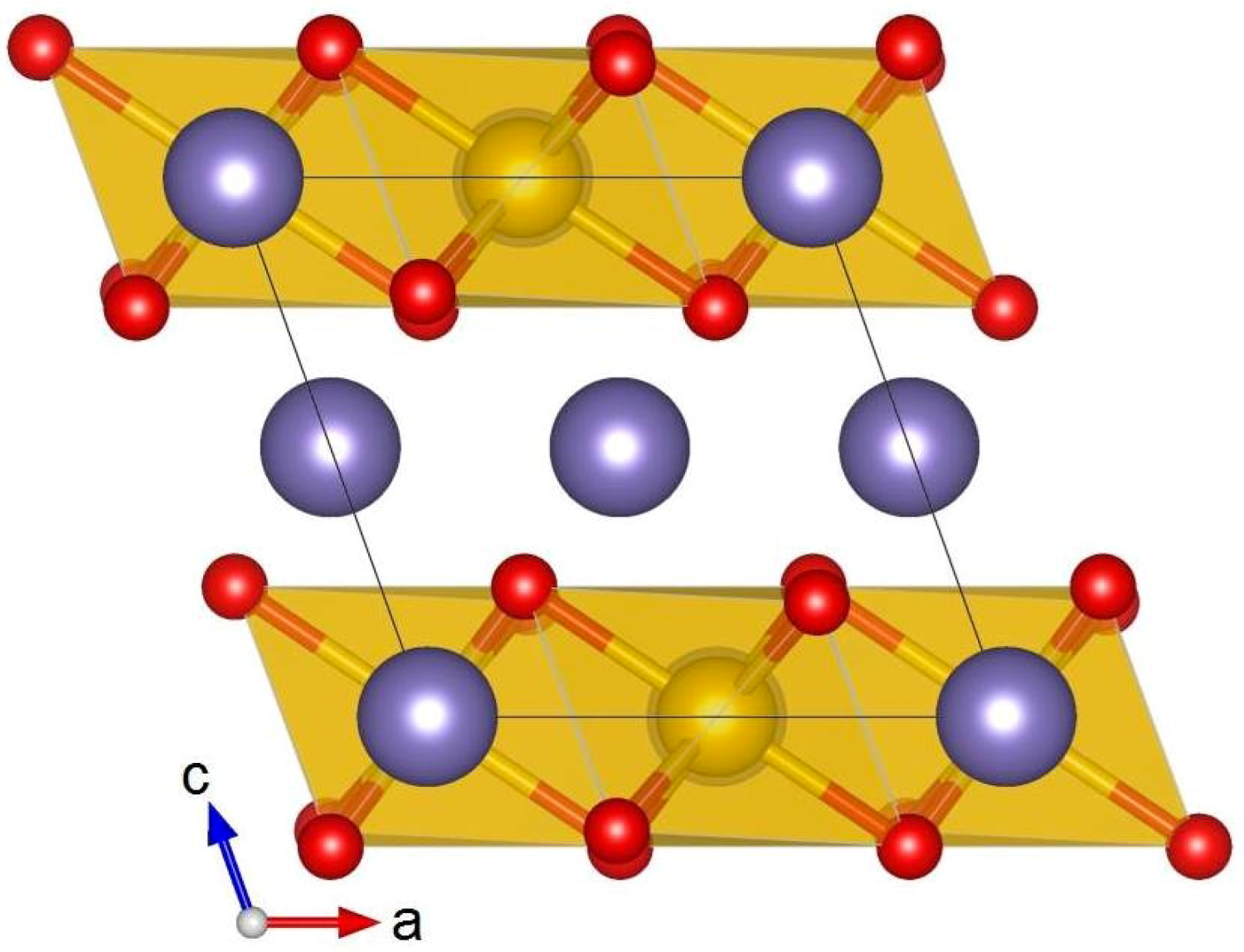

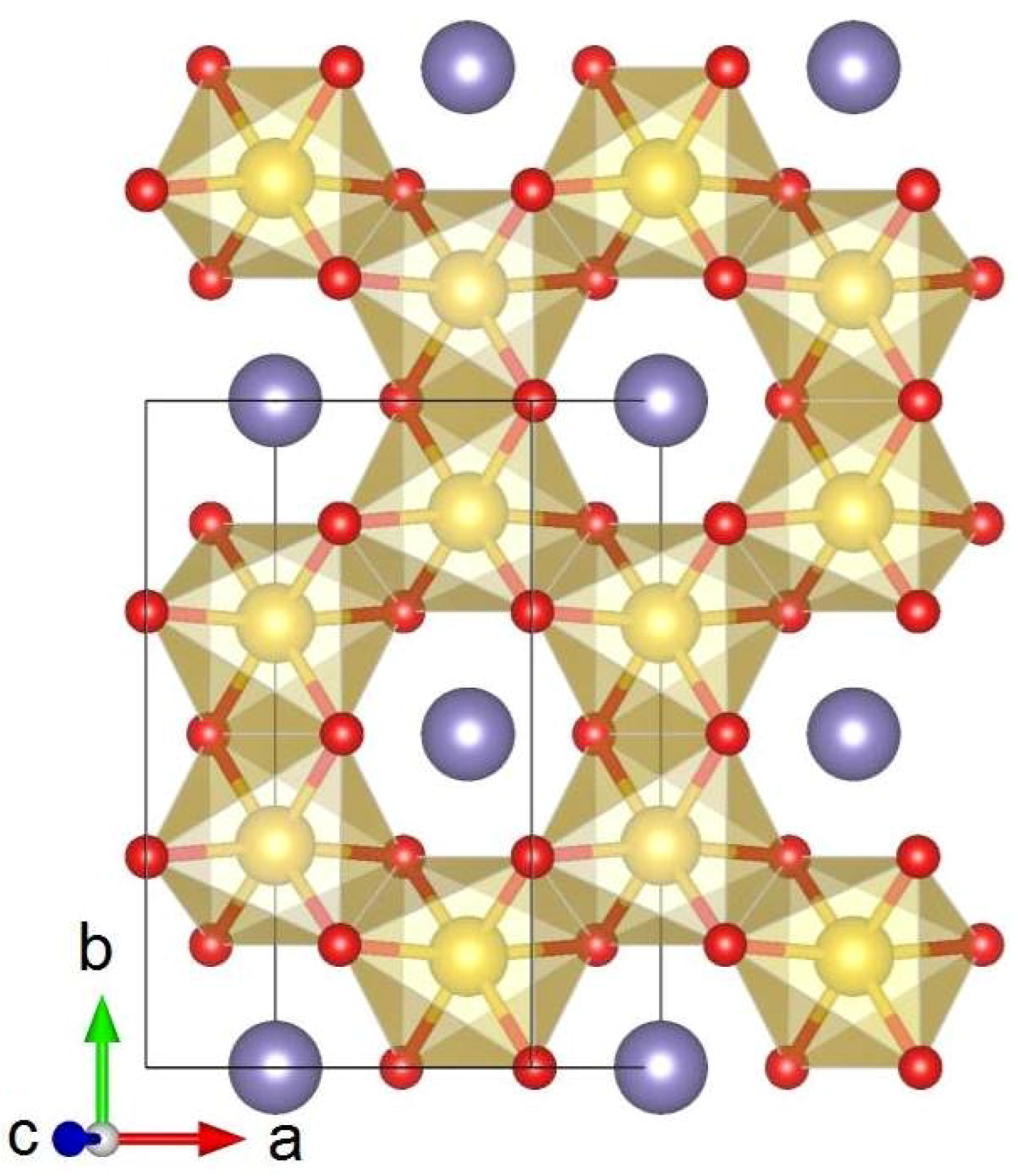
- Crystal structure with Ru shown in yellow, Li in purple and O in red

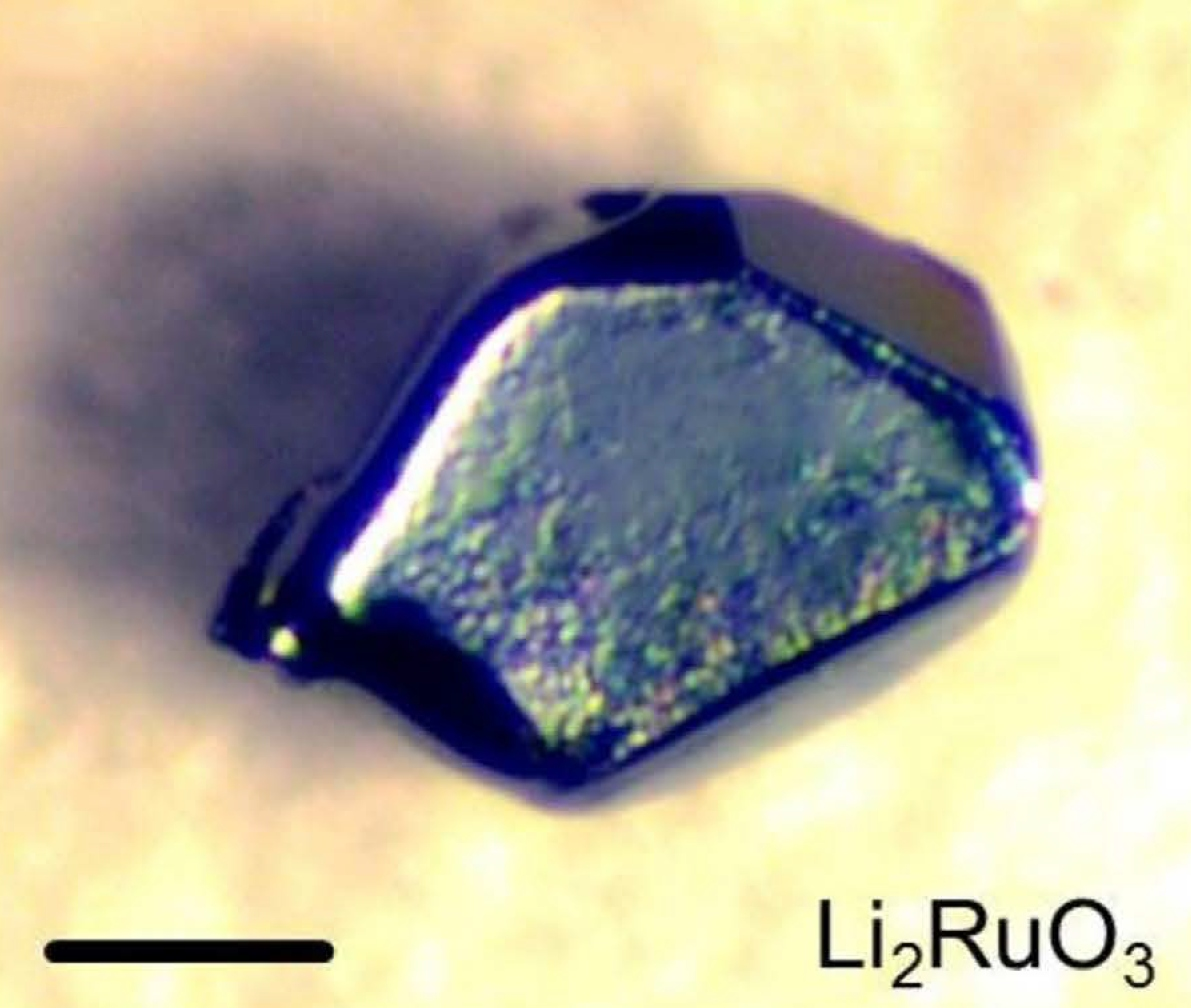
- Scale bar 0.1 mm

Names
- Preferred IUPAC name Lithium ruthenate

Identifiers
CAS Number	12508-91-7
3D model (JSmol)	Interactive image
ChemSpider	129549570
PubChem CID	165360223
- InChI: InChI=1S/2Li.3O.Ru/q2*+1;;2*-1; Key: YDDSSMAAWNLGBJ-UHFFFAOYSA-N
- SMILES: [Li+].[Li+].[O-][Ru](=O)[O-]

Properties
Chemical formula	Li_{2}RuO_{3}
Appearance	Dark blue crystals

Structure
Crystal structure	Monoclinic
Space group	P2_{1}/m (No. 11)
Formula units (Z)	4

Related compounds
Other anions	Lithium iridate; Lithium platinate
- Except where otherwise noted, data are given for materials in their standard state (at 25 °C [77 °F], 100 kPa). (what is ?) Infobox references

Lithium ruthenate, Li_{2}RuO^{(IV)}_{3}, or LRO, is a chemical compound of lithium, ruthenium and oxygen. It has a layered honeycomb crystal structure, and can be prepared by direct calcination of Ru metal or RuO_{2} and lithium carbonate at ca. 700 °C. The material is a potential lithium-ion battery electrode material and supercapacitor because of its high specific capacity due to lattice oxygen redox. This application is hindered by the high costs of Ru, as compared to the cheaper Li_{2}MnO_{3} alternative

Despite having a low-spin state of Ru(IV), namely 4d^{4}, above 540 K there have been observed Ru-Ru dimers which decrease the magnetic susceptibility of the material.

The compound is known to react with water in neutral and basic solutions to partially exchange Li_{2}O with H_{2}O in its structure. The new phase, Li_{2-x}H_{x}RuO_{3}, is structurally different from pure Li_{2}RuO_{3}.

The delithiathed phase, Li_{2-x}RuO_{3}, is nonstoichiometric. It exhibits Ru^{4+}-Ru^{4+} dimers and above 539 K has increase in magnetic susceptibility.

== Other phases ==
While Li_{2}RuO_{3} could be obtained from mixing Li_{2}CO_{3} and RuO_{2} at 800°C, when the same mixture is heated at 900°C, another ruthenate, Li_{3}Ru^{(V)}O_{4}, is obtained. Li_{7}RuO_{6} and the cubic NaCl-like Li_{x}RuO_{1+x} have also been reported.
