= Lithium platinate =

Chemical compound

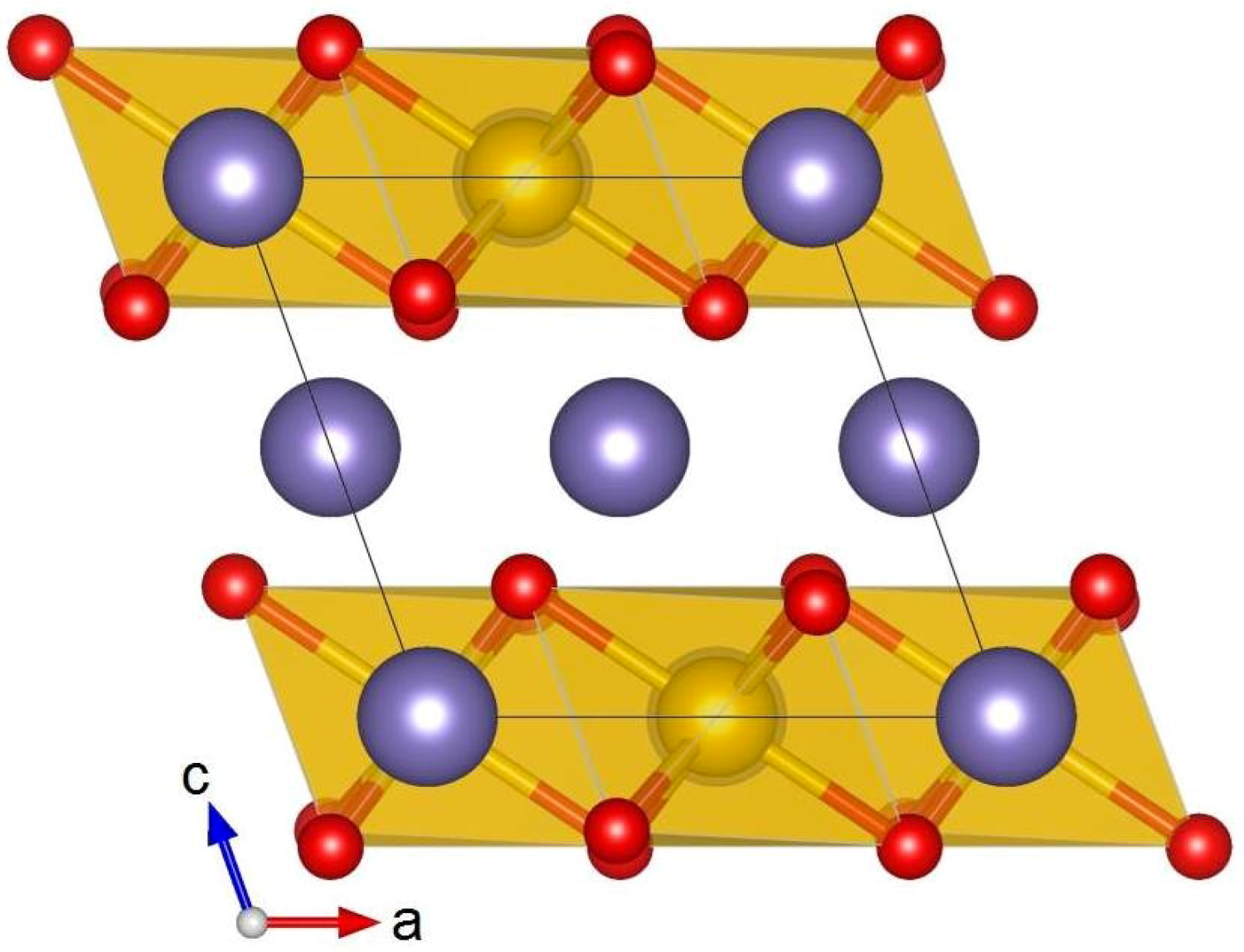

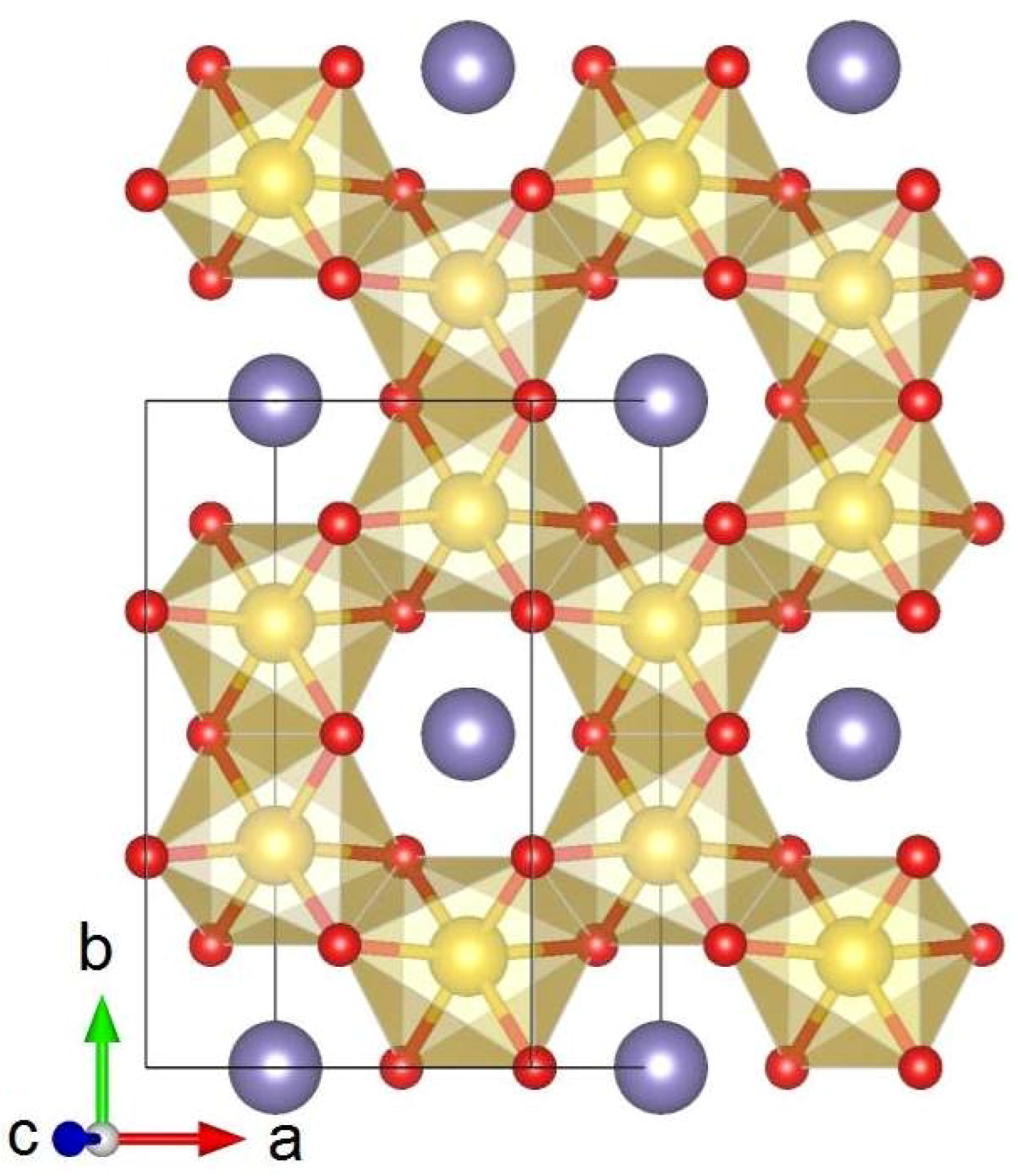
- Crystal structure with Pt shown in yellow, Li in purple and O in red

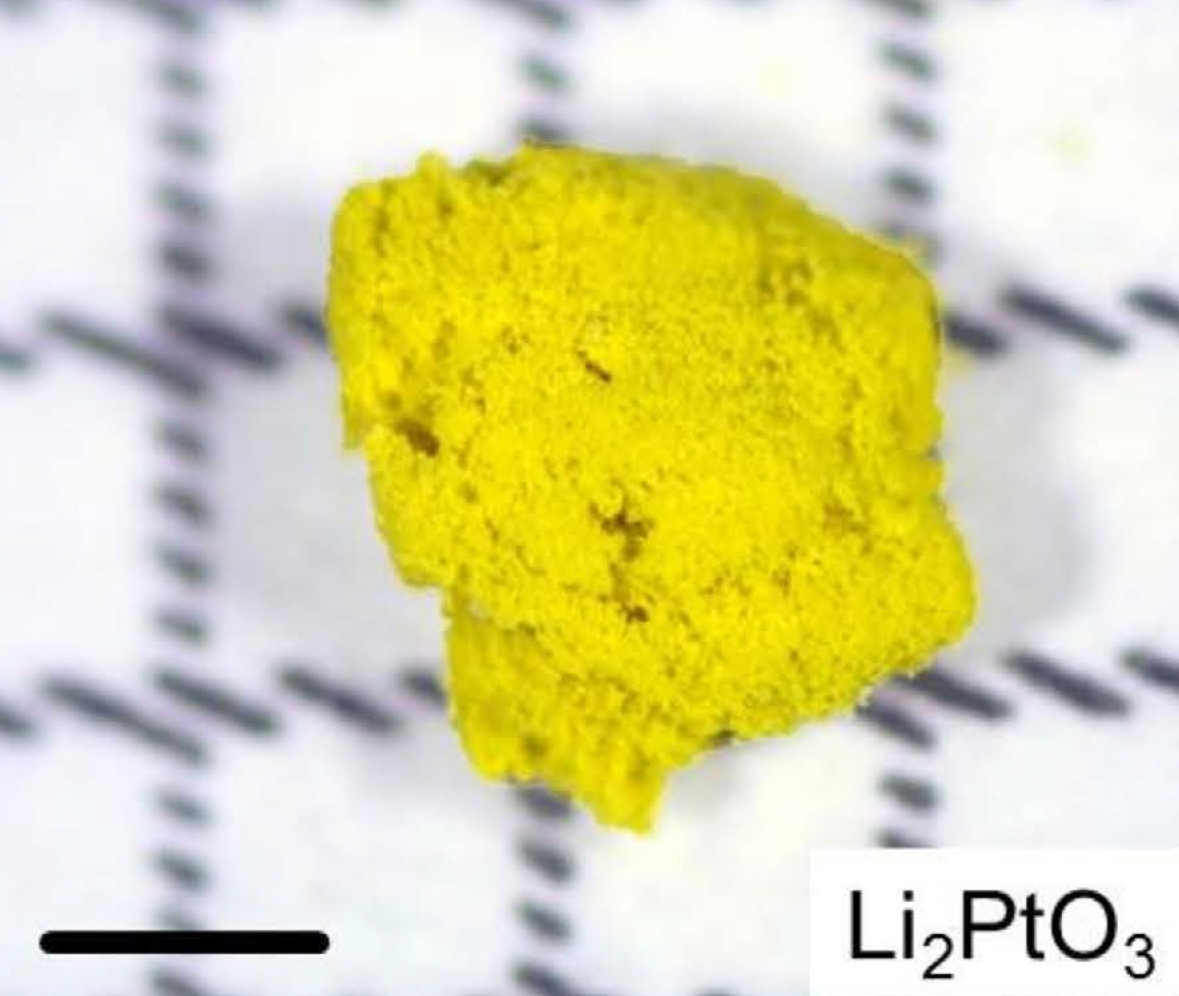
- Scale bar 1 mm

Names
- Preferred IUPAC name Lithium platinate

Identifiers
CAS Number	37363-24-9
3D model (JSmol)	Interactive image
- InChI: InChI=1S/2Li.3O.Pt/q2*+1;;2*-1; Key: CVMPVCBSFYSFDB-UHFFFAOYSA-N
- SMILES: [Li+].O=[Pt]([O-])[O-].[Li+]

Properties
Chemical formula	Li_{2}PtO_{3}
Appearance	Yellow crystals
Band gap	2.3 eV

Structure
Crystal structure	Monoclinic, C2/m
Lattice constant	a = 5.1836(2) Å, b = 8.9726(3) Å, c = 5.1113(1) Å α = 90°, β = 109.864(2)°, γ = 90°
Formula units (Z)	4

Related compounds
Other anions	Lithium iridate, lithium ruthenate
- Except where otherwise noted, data are given for materials in their standard state (at 25 °C [77 °F], 100 kPa). (what is ?) Infobox references

Lithium platinate, Li_{2}PtO_{3}, is a chemical compound of lithium, platinum and oxygen. It is a semiconductor with a layered honeycomb crystal structure and a band gap of 2.3 eV, and can be prepared by direct calcination of Pt metal and lithium carbonate at ca. 600 °C. Lithium platinate is a potential lithium-ion battery electrode material, though this application is hindered by the high costs of Pt, as compared to the cheaper Li_{2}MnO_{3} alternative.
