= Sodium iridate =

Sodium iridate (Na_{3}Ir_{3}O_{8})
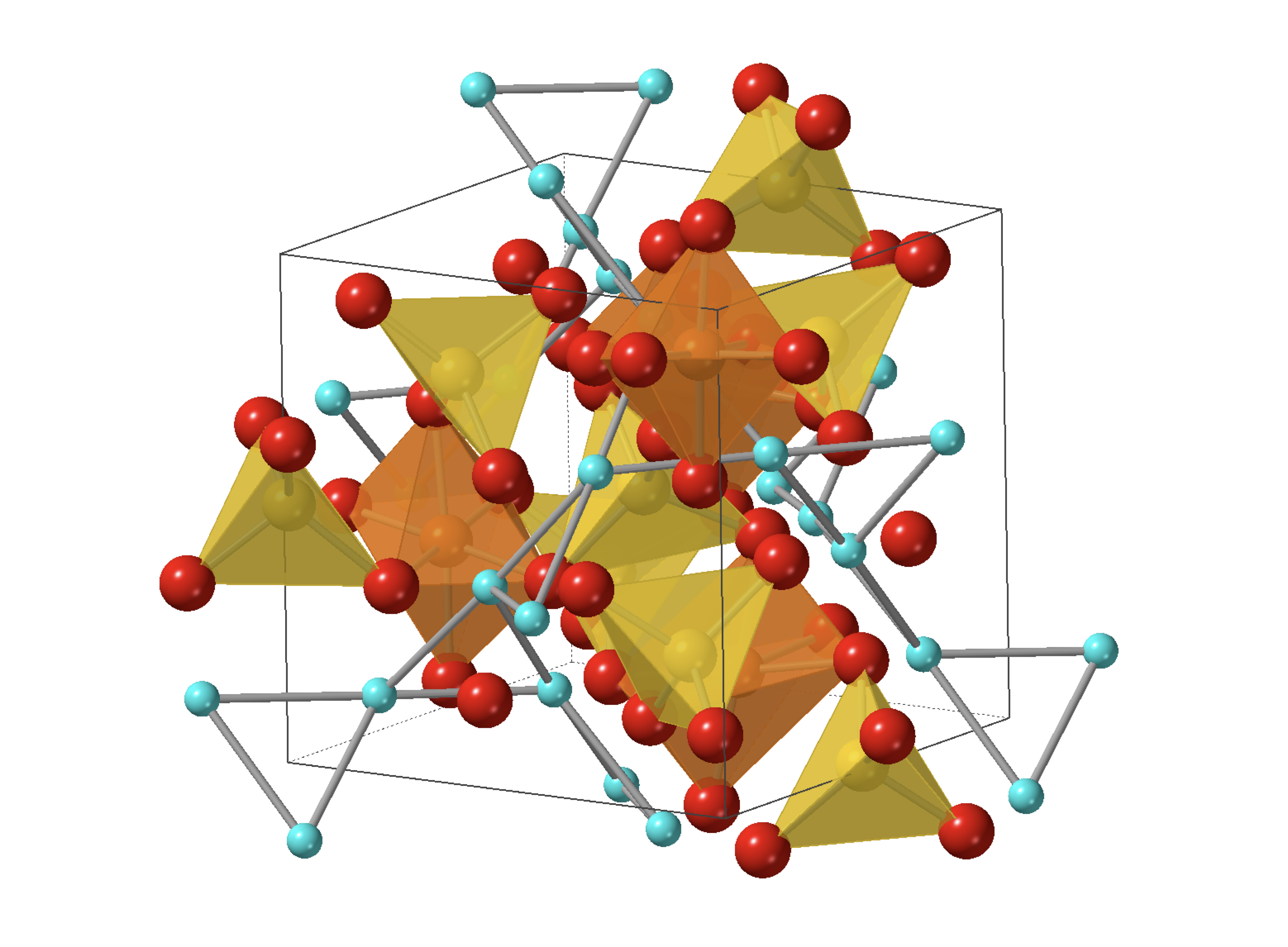
- Crystal structure of sodium iridium oxide Na_{3}Ir_{3}O_{8}. Cyan spheres show the Ir hyperkagome network; red spheres are oxygen atoms; polyhedra indicate two Na coordination environments.

Properties
Chemical formula	Na_{3}Ir_{3}O_{8}
Molar mass	773.61 g/mol
Density	7.50 g/cm^{3}

Structure
Crystal structure	cubic
Space group	P4_{1}32 (No. 213)
Lattice constant	a = 8.9857(4) Å
Formula units (Z)	4
- Except where otherwise noted, data are given for materials in their standard state (at 25 °C [77 °F], 100 kPa). Infobox references

Sodium iridate (chemical formula Na_{3}Ir_{3}O_{8}) is a sodium–iridium oxide that is geometrically frustrated, making it a strongly spin–orbit-coupled transition metal oxide. It is described as a hyperkagome iridate related to Na_{4}Ir_{3}O_{8}, whose hyperkagome lattice is a three-dimensional network of corner-sharing triangular units. Na_{3}Ir_{3}O_{8} is described as a 1/3-doped analogue of Na_{4}Ir_{3}O_{8} (average Ir valence ≈ +4.33) and as semimetallic compared with the more insulating hyperkagome parent compound.

== Structure ==
Hyperkagome iridates are discussed as spinel-related (ordered-spinel) materials in which the Ir sublattice forms a three-dimensional network of corner-sharing triangles (the hyperkagome lattice). The hyperkagome can be viewed as a "deleted" pyrochlore-type network obtained by removing one-quarter of sites from a pyrochlore lattice. In iridates with Ir^{4+} (5d^{5}), strong spin–orbit coupling entangles spin and t_{2g} orbital character into effective J_{eff} = 1/2 moments, which is often used to motivate spin-liquid proposals for the hyperkagome lattice. Na_{3}Ir_{3}O_{8} is described as a chiral, frustrated hyperkagome system and is commonly discussed as a doped member within the Na_{4−x}Ir_{3}O_{8} family. Partial Na deintercalation from Na_{4}Ir_{3}O_{8} can lead to a doped hyperkagome with Na_{3}Ir_{3}O_{8} as an end member.

== Physical properties ==
Na_{3}Ir_{3}O_{8} demonstrates strong spin–orbit coupling combined with lattice-driven electronic-structure effects (including distortion-induced molecular orbitals in the hyperkagome setting). Because it combines a frustrated lattice with strong spin–orbit coupling and chiral structure, it has been suggested as a platform to explore unconventional electronic transport, including possible topological contributions.

== See also ==
- Kagome Lattice
- Quarter cubic honeycomb
- Quantum spin liquid
