= Jim Jupp =

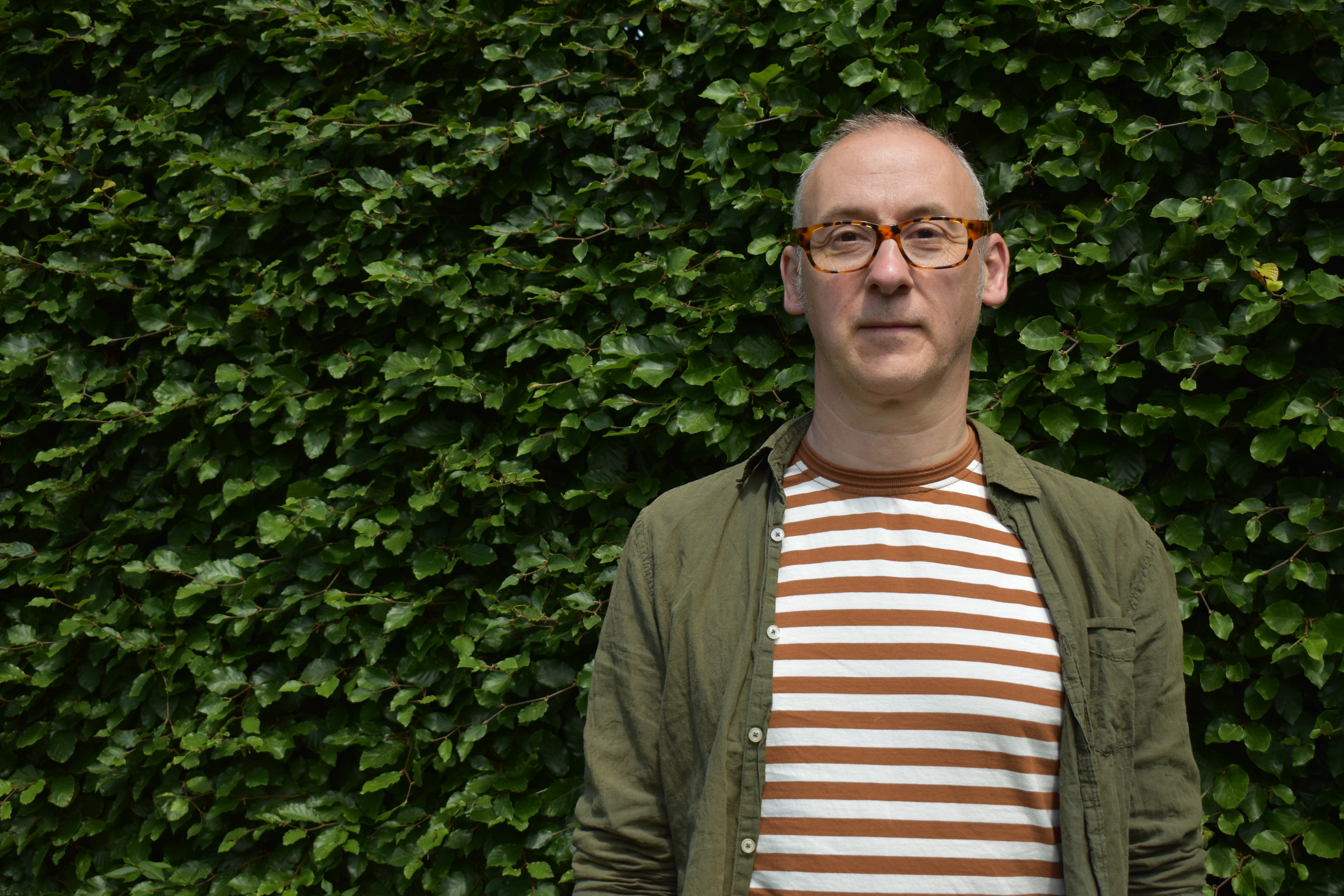
Jupp in 2020

Jim Jupp is a producer, composer, and along with the graphic designer Julian House he co-owns the Ghost Box record label and manager of Belbury Music Publishing. He records as Belbury Poly. Jupp also runs his own music publishing business and small run record label, Belbury Music

== Recording career ==
Since 2004 he has recorded six albums for Ghost Box with Belbury Poly, and one album as Eric Zann and also records with Cate Brooks as The Belbury Circle. He has collaborated on Ghost Box singles and EPs with John Foxx, Pye Corner Audio, Spacedog, The Advisory Circle and Moon Wiring Club, Jupp has remixed work by Pye Corner Audio, The Advisory Circle, Moon Wiring Club, Bill Ryder-Jones, John Foxx, Mirrors, Bernard Fevre, The Memory Band, Sharron Kraus. The track "The Willows" taken from the first Belbury Poly album of the same name was reworked by Paul Weller as "Earth Beat" for his 2020 album On Sunset. The debut EP by Belbury Poly, Farmer's Angle was included in an Electronic Sound magazine feature, A History of Electronic Music in 75 Records.

== Musical influence ==
In interviews Jupp has cited several influences including French soundtrack composer François de Roubaix, Harmonia, the BBC Radiophonic Workshop, Broadcast, Caravan and more generally Early Music, folk music, Krautrock, 1970s television soundtracks and electronic music of the 1960s and 1970s.
