= Scarfolk =

Fictional northern English town

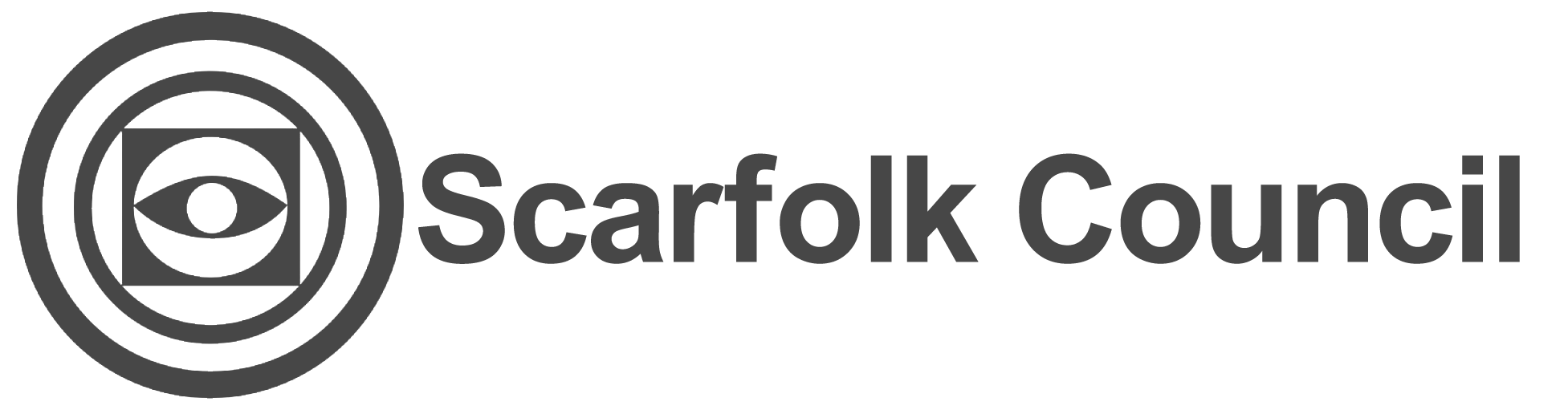
- Website type: Graphic design/internet humor blog
- Available in: English
- Creator: Richard Littler
- Website: scarfolk.blogspot.com
- Current status: Inactive (no content added since 2023)

Scarfolk is a fictional northwestern English town created by writer and designer Richard Littler, who is sometimes identified as the town mayor, L. Ritter. It is trapped in a time loop set in the 1970s, and its culture, parodying that of Britain at the time, features elements of the absurd and the macabre. It was first released as a blog of fake historical documents parodying British public information posters of the 1970s, and a collected book was published in 2014; the Scarfolk Annual was released in 2019. Scarfolk is depicted as a bleak, post-industrial landscape through unsettling images of urban life. Littler's output belongs to the genres of hauntology and dystopian satire; his psychologically disturbing form of humour has been likened to the writings of George Orwell and J. G. Ballard.

== Description ==
Scarfolk, which is forever locked in the 1970s, is a satire not only on that decade but also on contemporary events. It touches on themes of totalitarianism, suburban life, occultism and religion, school and childhood, as well as social attitudes such as racism and sexism.

Scarfolk was initially presented as a fake blog which purportedly releases artefacts from archive of the fictional town council, Scarfolk Council. Artefacts include public information literature, out-of-print books, record and cassette sleeves, advertisements, television programme screenshots, household products, and audio and video, many of which suggest brands and imagery recognisable from the period. Additionally, artefacts are usually accompanied by short fictional vignettes that are also presented as factual and that introduce the town's residents. The public information literature often ends with the strapline: "For more information please reread."

== Aesthetic ==
The aesthetic is utilitarian, inspired by public sector materials in the United Kingdom such as public information films and posters issued by the Central Office of Information and British Transport Films during the 1970s. Digitally altered photographs and illustrations parody publicity campaigns of the period such as Protect and Survive, Charley Says and The Finishing Line, as well as contemporary Penguin and Pelican paperback book covers and children's toys, such as Action Man. Images are altered to convey a sinister or potentially violent message and are deliberately distressed to appear worn and dog-eared.

Writing in The Daily Telegraph author Richard Littler stated that his Scarfolk style was the product of several influences, including George Orwell, television programmes such as Monty Python's Flying Circus and The League of Gentlemen, satirist Chris Morris, and the work of cartoonists Gerald Scarfe and Ralph Steadman. Littler considers Scarfolk as part hauntology, an aesthetic movement that draws on "the darker aspects of the 1970s". Littler also drew on the satirical 2002 television science series Look Around You.

Littler has said "I was always scared as a kid, always frightened of what I was faced with. ... You'd walk into WHSmith... and see horror books with people's faces melting. Kids' TV included things like Children of the Stones, a very odd series you just wouldn't get today. I remember a public information film made by some train organisation in which a children's sports day was held on train tracks and, one by one, they were killed. It was insane. ... I'm just taking it to the next logical step."

== Media controversies ==
In January 2014, the London Evening Standard published an article by Charles Saatchi, which accidentally included the cover of a Scarfolk book called Eating Children: Population Control & The Food Crisis instead of the intended Jonathan Swift publication A Modest Proposal (1729).

In July 2018, a parody Scarfolk poster was mistakenly featured in the UK government's in-house magazine Civil Service Quarterly as part of a serious article about the history of government communications. The inclusion of the poster, which bore the slogan "If you suspect your child has RABIES, don't hesitate to SHOOT", attracted some media attention.

== Reception ==
Scarfolk has received positive reactions from the public and media in the United Kingdom and abroad. GQ Magazine called it one of "The 100 Funniest Things in the History of the Internet". Reviews and interviews with Littler have appeared in publications such as Creative Review, The Independent, The Telegraph, Stylenoir, and The Honest Ulsterman, and have been featured by popular online sites such as Boing Boing and Dangerous Minds.

Design Week called Scarfolk "a queasy, unsettling provincial place".

== Associated works ==
=== Discovering Scarfolk ===
Discovering Scarfolk
- Front cover
- Language: English
- Subject: Scarfolk
- Genre: Guide; Satire
- Publisher: Ebury Publishing
- Publication date: 16 October 2014
- Publication place: England
- Media type: Hardcover
- Pages: 192
- ISBN: 0091958482
- Followed by: Scarfolk Annual

A book called Discovering Scarfolk, which tells the story of a family trapped in the town, was published in October 2014 by Ebury Press. It is a guide to all aspects of Scarfolk and covers the "frenzied archive of Daniel Bush, whose sons 'disappeared' in Scarfolk in 1970." Littler has said that the book "attempts to guide you through the darkness by making light of the contradictions and it promises not to unnerve you. Well, not too much anyway."

Boing Boing's co-editor Cory Doctorow said "[Discovering Scarfolk] looks to be absolutely genius." Digital Arts reviewed Discovering Scarfolk favorably with "We've seen so many blogs turned into books that it should probably be its own genre, but Discovering Scarfolk is one of the few to stand on its own and deserve to be more than a [sic] ill-conceived Christmas present." Starburst gave Discovering Scarfolk nine out of ten stars, calling it "a hilarious novel filled with so-creepy-it's funny illustrations and a relentlessly silly back story."

In his review of The Advisory Circle's From Out Here (2014), musician DJ Food remarked both From Out Here and Discovering Scarfolk define "a good portion of the visual stimulus associated with the hauntological genre."

=== Scarfolk Annual ===
Scarfolk Annual
- Language: English
- Subject: Scarfolk
- Genre: Guide; Satire
- Publisher: William Collins
- Publication date: 17 October 2019
- Publication place: England
- Media type: Hardcover
- Pages: 136
- ISBN: 978-0008307011
- Preceded by: Discovering Scarfolk
- Followed by: Scarfolk & Environs

A follow-up book to Discovering Scarfolk entitled Scarfolk Annual was published by HarperCollins on 17 October 2019. It satirises the British comic annual format and the cover resembles the BBC Publications annual based on the children's TV show Play School.

=== Scarfolk & Environs: Road & Leisure Map For Uninvited Tourists ===
Scarfolk & Environs: Road & Leisure Map For Uninvited Tourists
- Language: English
- Subject: Scarfolk
- Genre: Guide; Satire
- Publisher: Herb Lester Associates Ltd
- Publication date: 17 October 2019
- Publication place: England
- Media type: Paperback
- ISBN: 9781838216702
- Preceded by: Scarfolk Annual

A folded map entitled Scarfolk & Environs: Road & Leisure Map for Uninvited Tourists was published by Herb Lester Associates Ltd on 2 November 2020.

=== Unproduced television series ===
A Scarfolk television series, co-written by English writer and comedian Will Smith, was described as "in the works" in 2018, but ultimately did not enter production.

== In popular culture ==
In 2025, Charles Stross partially set the Laundry Files novel A Conventional Boy in Scarfolk. Stross confirmed that this was "a fictional homage to Littler's work".

== See also ==
- Welcome to Night Vale
