= Belbury Poly =

British musician

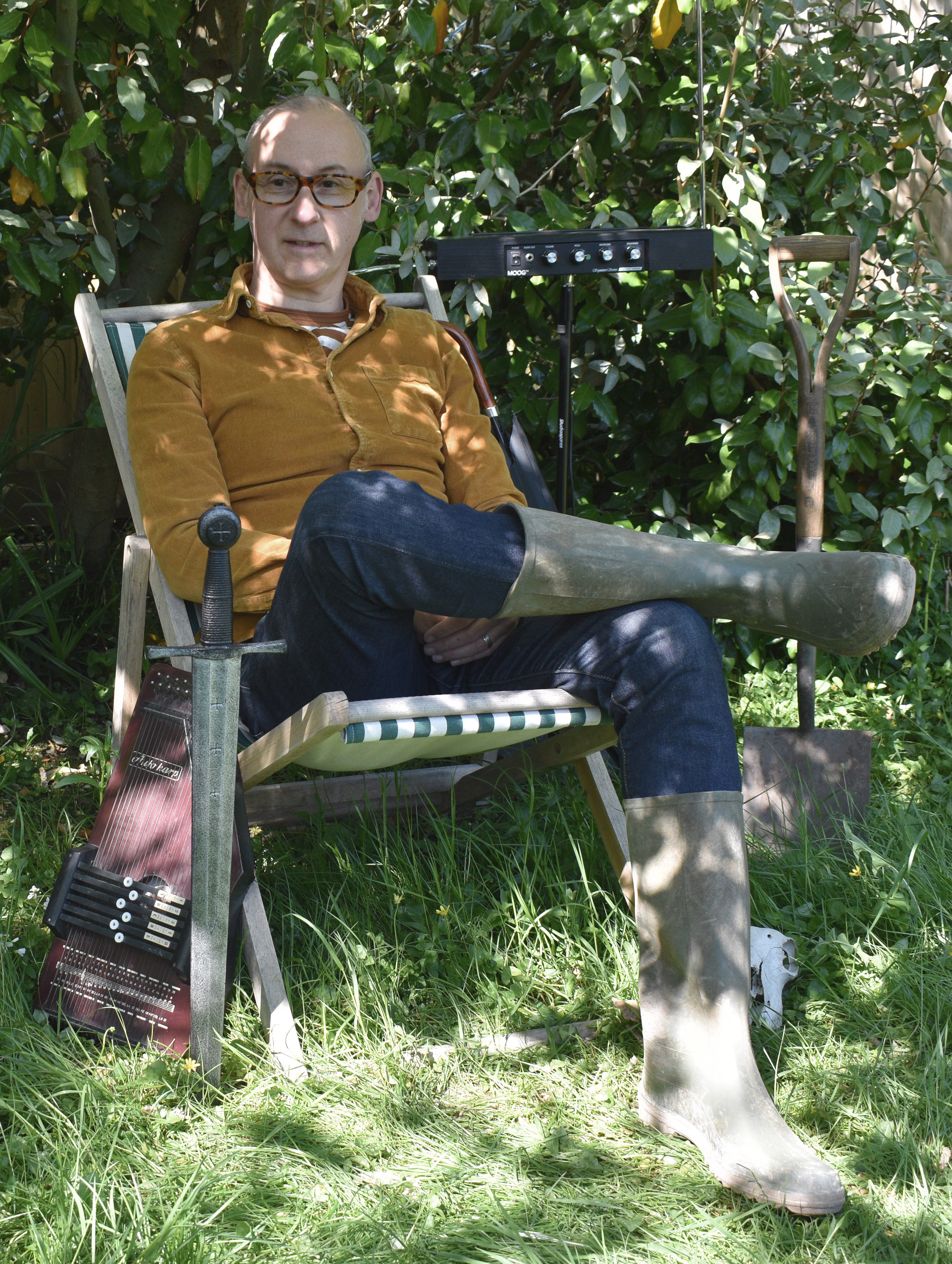

Background information
- Genres: Hauntology; electronic; library music; folk
- Label: Ghost Box
- Members: Jim Jupp
- Website: Belbury Poly on Ghost Box

Belbury Poly is the studio band of Ghost Box Records co-founder Jim Jupp. Jupp is the main composer and producer and also plays synth, keyboards and guitar. Other members are session musicians, that have included: Christopher Budd on bass and lead guitar, Jim Musgrave on drums, James Allen on drums, David Sharp on acoustic guitar and Cate Brooks on piano.

== Sound ==
Belbury Poly's sound is characterised as a kind of upbeat, electronic and rustic prog rock. Influences, range from old library music and TV soundtracks to keyboard driven 1970s prog rock, folk and Krautrock.

Jupp has spoken about Belbury Poly and the other artists on Ghost Box as sounding like the misremembered past of a parallel world, as well as acknowledging a debt to the author Arthur Machen. The name references the fictional town of Belbury, created by the author C.S. Lewis in his novel That Hideous Strength.

== Biography ==
Jim Jupp has released EPs, singles and six albums on Ghost Box under the name of Belbury Poly, and has released a dark ambient album for the label under the moniker Eric Zann. He is also a member of The Belbury Circle along with Cate Brooks (of The Advisory Circle) and occasional collaborator, John Foxx In 2019 he co-wrote and produced the music and spoken word album Chanctonbury Rings with Justin Hopper and Sharron Kraus. He has recorded library tracks for KPM, BMG and Lo-Editions. He has remixed tracks for several artists including John Foxx and Bill Ryder-Jones (The Coral). The track "The Willows" taken from the first Belbury Poly album of the same name was reworked by Paul Weller as "Earth Beat" for his 2020 album On Sunset. The debut EP by Belbury Poly, Farmer’s Angle was included in an Electronic Sound magazine feature, A History of Electronic Music in 75 Records.

== Discography ==
=== Albums and EPs ===
Title	Format	Label	Catalogue Number	Year
Farmer's Angle	3" CD EP/DL	Ghost Box	GBX001	2004
The Willows	CD/LP/DL	Ghost Box	GBX003	2005
The Owl's Map	CD/DL	Ghost Box	GBX007	2006
From an Ancient Star	CD/DL	Ghost Box	GBX011	2009
Farmer's Angle (Revised Edition)	CD/10"/DL	Ghost Box	GBX014	2010
The Belbury Tales	CD/LP/DL	Ghost Box	GBX016	2012
New Ways Out	CD/LP/DL	Ghost Box	GBX024	2016
The Gone Away	CD/LP/DL	Ghost Box	GBX035	2020
The Path	CD/LP/DL	Ghost Box	GBX043	2023
Sorcery	CD/LP/DL	Belbury Music	BM10LP	2026

=== Singles ===
As	Title	Format	Catalogue Number	Year
Belbury Poly and Moon Wiring Club	Study Series 01: Youth and Recreation	7"/DL	GBX701	2010
Belbury Poly and Mordant Music	Study Series 03: Welcome to Godalming	7"/DL	GBX703	2010
Belbury Poly and The Advisory Circle	Study Series 08: Inversions	7"/DL	GBX708	2012
Belbury Poly and Spacedog	Study Series 10: Message and Method	7"/DL	GBX710	2013
Pye Corner Audio with Belbury Poly	Other Voices 05: Machines are Obsolete/Pathways	7"/DL	GBX715	2015
Sharron Kraus with Belbury Poly	Other Voices 10: Something out of Nothing	7"/DL	GBX720	2018

=== Album appearances ===
Album Title	Album Artist	Label	Catalogue Number	Year
Ley Line	Justin Hopper	Bandcamp	self-released	2014
Shirley Inspired: A Tribute to Shirley Collins	Various Artists	Earth	EARTHLP003	2015
Folklore of Plants Volume 1	Various Artists	Folklore Tapes		2017
Chanctonbury Rings	Justin Hopper, Sharron Kraus and Belbury Poly	Ghost Box	GBX033	2019
Intermission	Various Artists	Ghost Box	GBXD008	2020

=== Remixes ===
Track Title	Original Artist	Album, Single, EP title	Label	Catalogue Number	Year
Taxi Negro (Black Cab Mix)	Tremolo Audio	Visitas	Mil Records	MRCD009	2008
Ghost Office (Remixed by Belbury Poly)	Xylitol	Xylitol Music as played by Other People	self-released		2010
Escape Hatch	Bernard Fevre	The Strange World of Bernard Fevre Remixes	Universal	NJ9048	2010
And The Cuckoo Comes To Belbury	The Advisory Circle	Mind How You Go (Revised Edition)	Ghost Box	GBX013	2010
Lights And Offerings (Belbury Poly Mix)	Mirrors	The White EP	Skint	SKINT216ID	2011
Summerland (Belbury Poly Mix)	John Foxx and the Maths	The Shape of Things	Metamatic	META29CD	2011
If... (Belbury Poly Mix)	Bill Ryder-Jones	If... Remixes	Domino	DS061	2012
Hobby Horse	The Memory Band	Further Navigations	Static Caravan	Van 272	2014
Broken Folk	Seatman and Powell	Broken Folk	KS Audio	KSA 008	2018
Something Out of Nothing	Sharron Kraus	Other Voices 10	Ghost Box	GBX720	2018

=== The Belbury Circle (Belbury Poly and The Advisory Circle) Discography ===
Title	Format	Label	Catalogue Number	Year
Empty Avenues	10" EP/CD EP/DL	Ghost Box	GBX019	2013
Outward Journeys	CD/LP/DL	Ghost Box	GBX029	2017
