= Zann =

Zann may refer to:

- Lenore Zann (born 1959), a Canadian actress and politician
- Richard Zann (1944–2009), an Australian ornithologist
- Eric Zann, an alias of electronic musician Jim Jupp
- Zann, a fictional deity in Forgotten Realms
- Tyber Zann, leader of the Zann Consortium, a criminal organization in the video game Star Wars: Empire at War: Forces of Corruption
- Zann Mureed, a 2018 Pakistani drama serial

== See also ==
- "The Music of Erich Zann", a horror short story by American author H. P. Lovecraft
