= The Belbury Tales =

Studio album by Belbury Poly
- Released: 24 February 2012
- Genre: Ambient; Electronic music Musique concrète
- Label: Ghost Box Music GBX016
- Producer: Jim Jupp

Belbury Poly chronology
From an Ancient Star (2009)	The Belbury Tales (2012)	New Ways Out (2016)

The Belbury Tales is a 2012 concept album by Jim Jupp, the fourth studio album under the pseudonym of Belbury Poly. It was released on 24 February 2012 on CD, online download, and 12" vinyl record. Rob Young contributed the short story "The Journeyman’s Tale" to the liner notes.

== Development ==
Jim Jupp told Fact "most of the tracks went through at least ten versions over the last two and half years." Jon Brooks of The Advisory Circle provided technical assistance for the album's production.

== Track listing ==
All tracks are written by Jim Jupp. Guest musicians included Jim Musgrave on drums and Christopher Budd on bass and electric guitar.

No.	Title	Length
1.	"Belbury Poly Logotone B"	0:14
2.	"Cantalus"	3:24
3.	"Green Grass Grows"	3:31
4.	"The Geography"	4:10
5.	"A Pilgram's Path"	4:31
6.	"Now Then"	2:27
7.	"Chapel Perilous"	4:27
8.	"Unheimlich"	2:46
9.	"My Hands"	1:20
10.	"Goat Foot"	3:03
11.	"Unforgotten Town"	4:17
12.	"Earth Lights"	4:53
13.	"Summer Round"	6:37

== Reception ==
Professional ratings
Review scores
Source	Rating
Allmusic	4/5 stars
Drowned in Sound	8.0/10.0
Pitchfork	7.2/10.0
Record Collector	3 stars
Tiny Mix Tapes	4.5/5.0

AllMusic noted The Belbury Tales "will require repeat listens in order to really appreciate the little details and the true scope of the Ghost Box sound, a fine little story book of music that slowly opens a haunted crypt of memories and prophecies. BBC Music Review called The Belbury Tales "infused with a deep vein of paranoia, a palpable fear, an attempt to reconcile the imminent unknown (evoking a reimagined or never experienced past). But whereas previous albums have alluded to the grim spectre of the Cold War, this time around the spooks appear to be a little closer to home." Boing Boing's David Pescovitz praised The Belbury Tales citing "Jupp's freshly nostalgic forays into library music of yore filtered through his own progrock-loving, analog synth filters are enhanced with real drum and bass (and guitar) by, respectively, Jim Musgrave and Christopher Budd."

Fact reviewed The Belbury Tales "one of the most rewarding and fully realised projects in the Ghost Box catalogue – and that’s high praise indeed." Pitchfork placed The Belbury Tales as "stranded somewhere between the abstract work of Jupp's past and the fuller sound of the live instrumentation he is applying, making this feel like his most pleasingly open-ended release so far." Record Collector rated the album with three stars commenting "one of his [Jim Jupp's] most multiplex; augmenting his sparse synth blueprints with outside musicians allows Jupp to wander ever deeper into the catacombs of his mind."
