= MVAL =

MVAL may refer to:

- Mount Vernon Arts Lab, pseudonym of Scottish musician Drew Mulholland
- Mission Valley Athletic League, a California schools athletic league
- Monocacy Valley Athletic League, a Maryland schools athletic league
