= The Museum of Imaginary Animals =

Studio album by Pram
- Released: 12 September 2000
- Genres: Dream pop, avant-pop
- Length: 45:01
- Labels: Domino, Merge
- Producer: Pram

Pram chronology
North Pole Radio Station (1998)	The Museum of Imaginary Animals (2000)	Dark Island (2003)

Singles from The Museum of Imaginary Animals
- 1. "The Owl Service" Released: 2000

Professional ratings
Review scores
Source	Rating
AllMusic	4.5/5 stars
Birmingham Post	3/4 stars
The Encyclopedia of Popular Music	4/5 stars
Pitchfork	7.7/10

The Museum of Imaginary Animals is the fifth album by the English band Pram, released on 12 September 2000.

== Critical reception ==
Exclaim! wrote: "It's rare that a band can be this eccentric and daring without sounding contrived or wilfully obscure, but there's an abiding organicism at the heart of Pram that keeps them, well, not exactly grounded, but welcoming." The Washington Post wrote that "Pram isn't as out there as it wants to be, but much of The Museum of Imaginary Animals draws you in." NME deemed the album "fractured and spindly, plundering post-rock and jazz and dub, without really sounding like any of them."

== Track listing ==
All lyrics are written by Rosie Cuckston; all music is composed by Pram.

No.	Title	Length
1.	"The Owl Service"	4:13
2.	"Bewitched"	4:25
3.	"Mother of Pearl"	5:10
4.	"Narwhal"	4:05
5.	"History of Ice"	4:02
6.	"The Mermaid's Hotel"	4:02
7.	"A Million Bubbles Burst"	5:38
8.	"Cat's Cradle"	4:31
9.	"Picturebox"	1:29
10.	"Play of the Waves"	7:26

== Personnel ==
- Rosie Cuckston – vocals, keyboards, omnichord
- Matt Eaton – guitar, bass guitar, sampler, keyboards
- Sam Owen – bass guitar, guitar, keyboards, accordion, woodwind
- Max Simpson – keyboards, sampler
- Stephen Perkins – drums, percussion
- Alex Clare – trumpet, trombone
- Nick Sales – keyboards, guitar, woodwind, theremin, sampler
