= Ghostbox =

Ghostbox or Ghost box may refer to:

- Ghost Box Records, a recording label
- Ghostbox (paranormal research device), a radio with a frequency scan mode meant to detect EVPs and communicate with spirits
