= Let's Emerge! =

Studio album by Pye Corner Audio
- Released: 15 July 2022
- Length: 40:56
- Label: Sonic Cathedral

Pye Corner Audio chronology
Entangled Routes (2021)	Let's Emerge! (2022)

Professional ratings
Aggregate scores
Source	Rating
Metacritic	80/100
Review scores
Source	Rating
AllMusic	4/5 stars
MusicOMH	4/5 stars
Uncut	7/10

Let's Emerge! is the fifth studio album by British electronic musician Pye Corner Audio. It was released on 15 July 2022 by Sonic Cathedral.

== Background ==
On 31 May 2022, Pye Corner Audio announced the release of a new studio album, moving away from his previous releases on the Ghost Box Records label.

== Critical reception ==
Let's Emerge! was met with "generally favorable" reviews from critics. At Metacritic, which assigns a weighted average rating out of 100 to reviews from mainstream publications, this release received an average score of 80, based on 4 reviews.

=== Accolades ===
Publications' year-end list appearances for Let's Emerge!
Critic/Publication	List	Rank	Ref
Norman Records	Norman Records' Top 50 Albums of 2022	44	
Piccadilly Records	Piccadilly Records' Top 100 Albums of 2022	20	

== Track listing ==
Let's Emerge track listing
No.	Title	Length
1.	"De-Hibernate"	5:43
2.	"Lyracal"	4:19
3.	"Does It Go Dark?"	3:57
4.	"Haze Loops"	4:21
5.	"Let's Emerge, Part One"	2:29
6.	"Saturation Point"	3:39
7.	"Sun Stroke"	3:07
8.	"Let's Emerge, Part Two"	1:15
9.	"Luminescence"	4:38
10.	"Warmth of the Sun"	7:30
