= Mind how you go =

Mind how you go may refer to:

- Mind How You Go (The Advisory Circle album), 2005
- Mind How You Go (Skye Edwards album), 2006
- "Mind How You Go", a 1965 single by Barry St. John (Elizabeth Thompson)
- "Mind How You Go", a 1967 single by Allan Smethurst
- "Mind How You Go", a 1966 single by Mr. Lee Grant (Bogdan Kominowski)
