= Farmer's Angle =

EP by Belbury Poly
- Released: 2004
- Genre: Electronic, musique concrète, ambient
- Label: Ghost Box GBX001; GBX014 (Revised Edition)
- Producer: Jim Jupp

Belbury Poly chronology
Farmer's Angle (2004)	The Willows (2004)

Farmer's Angle is an EP by Jim Jupp, under the pseudonym of Belbury Poly. It was released in 2004 on CD-R and was the first release on Ghost Box Records. In 2010, the EP was re-released and expanded on CD and 10" vinyl as Farmer's Angle' (Revised Edition), whilst it was re-issued in its original form on October 28, 2022, on CD and 7" vinyl.

== Track listing ==
All tracks are written by Jim Jupp.

No.	Title	Length
1.	"Farmer's Angle"	4:36
2.	"Wildspot"	1:24
3.	"The Eleventh House"	3:55
4.	"Cool Air"	2:31

=== Track titles ===
Like another musical alias of Jupp, Eric Zann, Cool Air is named after a minor H. P. Lovecraft short story.
