= The Moving Frontier =

Studio album by Pram
- Released: 1 October 2007
- Genre: Experimental pop, post-rock
- Length: 44:30
- Label: Domino

Pram chronology
Dark Island (2003)	The Moving Frontier (2007)	Across the Meridian (2018)

Professional ratings
Review scores
Source	Rating
AllMusic	4/5 stars
The Skinny	2/5 stars

The Moving Frontier is an album by Pram, released in 2007.

== Critical reception ==
AllMusic wrote that "exotica, '60s and '70s electronic novelty pop, and noir-ish jazz are still major influences on Pram's music, and on their instrumentals they mimic and modernize those sounds like few other bands can." NME deemed the album "45 minutes of bland, jazzy, nonsense." Clash thought that Pram had become "immersed in overtly odd, bloated high-art plodding."

== Track listing ==
1. 'The Empty Quarter'
2. 'Salt and Sand'
3. 'Iske'
4. 'The City Surveyor'
5. 'Sundew'
6. 'Salva'
7. 'Moonminer'
8. 'Hums Around Us'
9. 'Metaluna'
10. 'Beluga'
11. 'Blind Tiger'
12. 'Mariana Deep'
13. 'Compass Rose'
14. 'The Silk Road'

== Personnel ==
- Rosie Cuckston – vocals, keyboards, omnichord
- Matt Eaton – guitar, bass guitar, sampler, keyboards
- Sam Owen – bass guitar, guitar, keyboards, accordion, woodwind
- Max Simpson – keyboards, sampler
- Laurence Hunt – drums, percussion
- Harry Dawes – trumpet, trombone
- Natalie Mason – viola
- Grandmaster Gareth – cello, string arrangements
