= Beautify Junkyards =

Portuguese band

Background information
- Origin: Lisbon, Portugal
- Genres: Folk; Electronica; Hauntology
- Label: Ghost Box Records UK
- Members: João Branco Kyron; Martinez; João Moreira; Sergue Ra; Antonio Watts; Bernard Loopkin

Beautify Junkyards are a Portuguese group influenced by English acid folk, Brazilian Tropicália and contemporary electronica.

== Members ==
Led by João Branco Kyron on vocals and keyboards. With Martinez also on vocals, João Moreira on guitar, Bernard Loopkin on synths, Sergue Ra on bass and Antonio Watts on drums.

== History ==
Beautify Junkyards are a Lisbon-based band that released their 5th album, “NOVA”, in 2024 on Ghost Box Records - British cult labelwho has released records by artists such as Broadcast, John Foxx and Paul Weller, among many others.

The album was widely praised in international publications such as MOJO, UNCUT, Shindig and Electronic Sound, and received airplay on radios such as BBC2, BBC6, KEXP, RAI Radio 3, Radio France.

Over the years of activity, the band has played in various venues across Portugal.such as CCB, Teatro Trindade, ZdB gallery, Maus Hábitos, Casa da Música, Passos Manuel, Musicbox, Salão Brazil and participated in several festivals, such as Alive, Mexefest, Imminente, Impulso, among others.

In 2023 they performed a 10-dates tour in Italy and the United Kingdom. In 2019, they had made their debut in British soil, with a mini-tour that culminated in a sold-out concert at the mythical Cafe OTO in London.

The Beautify Junkyards are: João Branco Kyron (voices, synthesizers), Bernard Loopkin(synthesizers), Martinez (voices) João Moreira (guitar and synthesizers), Sergue Ra (bass), António Watts (drums and percussion).

== Discography ==
Title	Year	Format	Label
From The Morning (Nick Drake) / Fuga No.2 (Os Mutantes)	2012	7" single	Fruits de Mer Records
Beautify Junkyards	2013	LP/CD	Metrodiscos
The Beast Shouted Love	2015	LP/CD	Mega Dodo / Nos Discos
Other Voices 08: Constant Flux / Pirâmide	2016	7" single	Ghost Box Records
The Invisible World of Beautify Junkyards	2018	LP/CD	Ghost Box Records
Cosmorama	2021	LP/CD	Ghost Box Records
Painting Box (with Belbury Poly) / Ritual In Transfigured Time	2021	7" single	Ghost Box Records
Verde Pino / Dupla Exposição	2022	7" single	Lux Records
Nova	2024	LP/CD	Ghost Box Records
