= New Ways Out =

Studio album by Belbury Poly
- Released: 27 May 2016
- Genre: Electronic music Experimental music Krautrock
- Label: Ghost Box Music GBX024

Belbury Poly chronology
The Belbury Tales (2012)	New Ways Out (2016)

New Ways Out is a 2016 album by Jim Jupp, under the pseudonym of Belbury Poly. It was scheduled to be released on 27 May 2016 by independent record label Ghost Box Music on CD, online download, and 12" vinyl record.

== Accolades ==
Publication	Accolade	Year	Rank
Rough Trade	Albums of the Year	2016	94

== Track listing ==
=== 12" vinyl record ===
No.	Title	Length
1.	"These Ringing Hills"	4:13
2.	"Starhazy"	4:37
3.	"The Elsewhere Shuffle"	4:39
4.	"The New Harmony"	8:51
5.	"Hey Now Here He Comes"	3:43
6.	"The Green Scene"	3:40
7.	"Water Wheel"	3:57
8.	"Downstream"	4:15
9.	"Old Ways In"	5:54
10.	"Playground Gateway"	1:58

=== CD release ===
No.	Title	Length
1.	"These Ringing Hills"	4:13
2.	"Starhazy"	4:37
3.	"The Elsewhere Shuffle"	4:39
4.	"The New Harmony"	8:51
5.	"Hey Now Here He Comes"	3:43
6.	"The Green Scene"	3:40
7.	"Water Wheel"	3:57
8.	"Downstream"	4:15
9.	"Old Ways In"	5:54
10.	"All in Good Time"	3:56
11.	"Playground Gateway"	1:58

== Reception ==
DJ Food described the album "Autobahn-era Kraftwerk meets Glitter Band glam stomp meets folk-tinged vocals and sunshine Sesame Street ‘ba-ba-bum’ singalong harmonies."
