= Helium (Pram album) =

Studio album by Pram
- Released: September 1994
- Recorded: Third Sex Studios in Birmingham, England
- Genre: Post-rock
- Length: 50:15
- Label: Too Pure
- Producer: Pram

Pram chronology
Meshes EP (1994)	Helium (1994)	Sargasso Sea (1995)

Helium is the second album by English post-rock band Pram, released in September 1994 through Too Pure.

== Reception ==
Professional ratings
Review scores
Source	Rating
AllMusic	4/5 stars
Select	4/5
The Vinyl District	A−

The Vinyl District reviewed the album positively, stating that "the band’s playing is as urgent and vibrant as it is carefully assembled [...] Pram had become progressively more comfortable with the technology and the offbeat instruments at their fingertips." AllMusic noted that the album's musical elements—"Moog burblings, exotic rhythms, and cool-toned horns—are more typically the building blocks of lounge music, but Pram is instead all about uneasy listening, cutting and pasting schizophrenic sound collages topped off by Rosie Cuckston's unnerving vocals."

In 2016, Fact ranked Helium at number 29 on its list of the best post-rock albums.

== Track listing ==
All lyrics are written by Rosie Cuckston; all music is composed by Pram

No.	Title	Length
1.	"Gravity"	4:40
2.	"Dancing on a Star"	4:17
3.	"Nightwatch"	3:55
4.	"Things Left on the Pavement"	6:49
5.	"Windy"	2:43
6.	"My Father the Clown"	4:04
7.	"Blue"	8:14
8.	"Little Angel, Little Monkey"	4:32
9.	"Meshes in the Afternoon"	4:23
10.	"Shadows"	6:38

== Personnel ==
- Rosie Cuckston – vocals, keyboards
- Matt Eaton – guitar, bass guitar, keyboards, sampler
- Sam Owen – bass guitar, guitar, keyboards, backing vocals
- Max Simpson – keyboards, sampler
- Daren Garratt – drums, percussion
- Verdigris – horns
