= Modified Toy Orchestra =

The Modified Toy Orchestra is an experimental music group from Birmingham, England. Brian Duffy, the main member and creator of the orchestra makes the group's instruments by circuit bending sound making devices, such as toy keyboards, and educational spelling toys.

== History ==
The band was founded by Brian Duffy as a one-man project. He originally began by sampling sounds from toys to use in his electronic music, but after disassembling a Texas Instruments Speak & Spell he realised he could modify them to produce new sounds, turning the toys themselves into instruments. He began looking in car boot sales and skips for more electronic toys to modify and use in performances.

Duffy describes the intent behind his music as "an interest in the surplus value and hidden potential of seemingly redundant technology."

Louder than War discussed the band's sound in a review of their 2022 album: "Silfurberg... is a work of art. A techno classical album of sorts which tips an affectionate wink in the direction of Gustav Holst or Vangelis, also has hints of twenty-first century Orchestral Manoeuvres in the Dark and teases of Kraftwerk which are interwoven quite beautifully."

== Members ==
- Brian Duffy
- Darren Joyce
- Laurence Hunt
- Sean Tighe
- Chris Plant
- Graeme Rose

== Past members ==
- Mike Johnston – his last performance with Modified Toy Orchestra was on 15 October 2007 at the Birmingham Town Hall. He sang a cover version of Kraftwerk's Pocket Calculator as his last song with the band.

== Live ==
In 2006, the Modified Toy Orchestra was expanded from a one-man project by Brian Duffy to a full six-piece band, to have more possibilities when playing live.

New live members are: Laurence Hunt (Pram), Darren Joyce (Dreams of Tall Buildings), Mike Johnston (Plone, Mike in Mono), and visual projection artist Chris Plant. Together they have performed at the 2006 Sónar festival in Barcelona and Supersonic festival in the United Kingdom. Previous performances have included the Royal Institute, and supporting bands Heaven 17 and Melt Banana. Live sets have also been transmitted on Resonance FM and BBC Radio 1.

== Discography ==
- Silfurberg (CD album, Bit-Phalanx Music, 2022)
- Plastic Planet (LP, Warm Circuit Records, 2010)
- Pocket Calculator / TVOD (Limited Edition 7" vinyl, Warm Circuit Records, 2006)
- Toygopop (LP, Warm Circuit Records, 2006)
- This Is the Monkey (7" vinyl, Warm Circuit Records, 2004)
