= The Séance at Hobs Lane =

Studio album by Mount Vernon Arts Lab
- Released: 2001, rereleased on Ghost Box Music in 2007
- Genre: Electronic rock, Post-rock, Acousmatic music/Ambient
- Label: Ghost Box Music GBX009
- Producer: Drew Mulholland

The Séance at Hobs Lane is the fifth release by Drew Mulholland (with collaborators), under the pseudonym of Mount Vernon Arts Lab. Originally released through Via Satellite in 2001, the album was re-released on the Ghost Box Music label in 2007, and was created as an unofficial soundtrack to Quatermass and the Pit.

== Track listing ==
No.	Title	Length
1.	"The Fog Detonator"	0:57
2.	"Hobgoblins"	5:48
3.	"The Mandrake Club"	2:37
4.	"Dashwood's Reverie"	3:59
5.	"The Black Drop"	3:13
6.	"Sir Keith at Lambeth"	6:08
7.	"The Submariner's Song"	1:20
8.	"The Vauxhaull Labyrinth"	5:22
9.	"While London Sleeps"	5:27
10.	"Warminster 4"	3:24
11.	"Percy Toplis"	14:43

== Personnel ==
- Drew Mulholland - composer, synthesizer, theremin, guitar, effects, producer, recording engineer
- John Cavanagh - composer (track 4), harpsichord & clarinet (track 5), producer, recording engineer
- Norman Blake - composer & guitar (track 3)
- Adrian Utley - composer, mini moog & synthesizer (track 10)
- Isobel Campbell - cello (track 5)
- Raymond McDonald - saxophone (tracks 8 & 11)
- Morag Brown - flute (track 10)
- Coil - remixer (track 2)
- Barry 7 - remixer (track 7)
- Julian House - artwork (Ghost Box edition)
