= The Stars Are So Big, the Earth Is So Small... Stay as You Are =

The Stars Are So Big, The Earth Is So Small... Stay as You Are

Studio album by Pram
- Released: September 1993
- Recorded: Church Road in Birmingham, England
- Genre: Post-rock
- Length: 44:14
- Label: Too Pure
- Producer: Pram

Pram chronology
Iron Lung (1993)	The Stars Are So Big, The Earth Is So Small... Stay as You Are (1993)	Meshes EP (1994)

Professional ratings
Review scores
Source	Rating
AllMusic	3/5 stars
The Vinyl District	B+

The Stars Are So Big, The Earth Is So Small... Stay as You Are is the debut album by Pram, released in September 1993 through Too Pure. The album takes its name from a caption of an image in Marshall McLuhan’s work The Medium is the Massage.

== Reception ==
AllMusic described the group's post-rock sound as drawing on various possible influences, including The Velvet Underground, Nico, Yoko Ono, "Miles Davis' minimalist material from the late '60s," as well as "German futurists Can and Faust," and composer Angelo Badalamenti. The site concluded that "the results on this eight-song release are both original and enchanting. The surrealistic lyrics are disturbing and dreamlike, with references to insects and outer space, and the haunting music draws on a wealth of unexpected instrumentation (trumpet, toy piano, etc.) combined with Rosie Cuckston's wispy, off-key vocals." The Vinyl District called the album that "a solid full-length, but it captures Pram partway to full flower."

== Track listing ==
All lyrics are written by Rosie Cuckston; all music is composed by Pram.

No.	Title	Length
1.	"Loco"	4:28
2.	"Radio Freak in a Storm"	3:49
3.	"Loredo Venus"	4:26
4.	"Milky"	4:15
5.	"Dorothy"	3:53
6.	"In Dreams You Too Can Fly"	16:10
7.	"The Ray"	3:39
8.	"Cape St Vincent"	3:34

== Personnel ==
- Rosie Cuckston – vocals, keyboards
- Matt Eaton – guitar, bass guitar, keyboards, sampler
- Sam Owen – bass guitar, guitar, keyboards, backing vocals
- Pram – recording
- Max Simpson – keyboards, sampler
- Daren Garratt – drums
