= Gash (EP) =

EP by Pram
- Released: 1992
- Recorded: Strensham Hill and Wake Green Road, England
- Genre: Neo-psychedelia
- Length: 27:24
- Label: Howl
- Producer: Justin Broadrick

Pram chronology
Gash (1992)	Iron Lung (1993)

Professional ratings
Review scores
Source	Rating
AllMusic	3/5 stars

Gash is the debut EP by the neo-psychedelia band Pram. It was released in 1992 on Howl Records.

Originally a six-song album, the EP was re-released in 1997 as a full-length record on the æ label. Five more tracks were added to the release.

== Track listing ==
All lyrics are written by Rosie Cuckston, except "Inmate's Clothes" co-written by Sam Owen; all music is composed by Pram.

Side one
No.	Title	Length
1.	"Dead Piano"	3:42
2.	"Flesh"	2:13
3.	"Inmate's Clothes"	5:21

Side two
No.	Title	Length
1.	"I'm a War"	4:49
2.	"Pram"	5:21
3.	"Dirty Children"	5:58

CD issue
No.	Title	Length
1.	"Dead Piano"	3:42
2.	"Flesh"	2:13
3.	"Inmate's Clothes"	5:21
4.	"I'm a War"	4:49
5.	"Pram"	5:21
6.	"Dirty Children"	5:58
7.	"Blue Singer"	7:23
8.	"The Day the Animals Turned on the Cars"	4:45
9.	"Goosewalk"	1:30
10.	"Sunset International"	6:32
11.	"Bleed"	5:39

== Personnel ==
- Rosie Cuckston – vocals
- Sam Owen – bass guitar
- Phil Savage – production, engineering
- Max Simpson – keyboards, sampler
- Andy Weir – drums
