= The Owl's Map =

Studio album by Belbury Poly
- Released: 10 September 2006
- Genre: Ambient, electronic
- Label: Ghost Box Music GBX007
- Producer: Jim Jupp

Belbury Poly chronology
The Willows (2004)	The Owl's Map (2006)	From an Ancient Star (2009)

The Owl's Map is an album by Jim Jupp, under the pseudonym of Belbury Poly. The album was released on 10 September 2006 on the Ghost Box Music label.

== Track listing ==
No.	Title	Length
1.	"Owls And Flowers"	4:12
2.	"Rattler's Hey"	3:40
3.	"The Moonlawn"	4:17
4.	"Music, Movement & Meaning"	1:26
5.	"Wetland"	2:01
6.	"Tangled Beams"	3:40
7.	"The People"	5:02
8.	"The New Mobility"	4:56
9.	"Pan's Garden"	4:36
10.	"Lord Belbury's Folly"	3:13
11.	"Scarlet Ceremony"	6:11
12.	"Your Way Today"	1:22
