= Other Channels =

Studio album by The Advisory Circle
- Released: 10 March 2008
- Genre: Electronic, musique concrète, acousmatic music, ambient
- Label: Ghost Box GBX010
- Producer: Cate Brooks

The Advisory Circle chronology
| Mind How You Go (2005) | Other Channels (2008) | As the Crow Flies (2011) |

Other Channels is the debut album by Cate Brooks, under the pseudonym of The Advisory Circle. It was preceded by the mini-album Mind How You Go. The album was released on 10 March 2008 on the Ghost Box label.

== Track listing ==
| No. | Title | Length |
|---|---|---|
| 1. | "Callsign 'A' - The TV Trap" | 0:18 |
| 2. | "Civil Defence Is Common Sense" | 2:52 |
| 3. | "Mogadon Coffee Morning" | 2:56 |
| 4. | "Sundial" | 3:27 |
| 5. | "Swinscoe Episode 1 - 'Enter Swinscoe'" | 1:58 |
| 6. | "Celebrate Michaelmas NOW!" | 2:41 |
| 7. | "Fire, Damp & Air" | 3:44 |
| 8. | "Frozen Ponds PIF" | 0:52 |
| 9. | "Erosion Of Time" | 3:32 |
| 10. | "A Clear Yarn Warning" | 1:13 |
| 11. | "Keep Warm, Keep Well" | 2:48 |
| 12. | "Eyes Which Are Swelling" | 2:18 |
| 13. | "Hocusing For Beginners" | 3:50 |
| 14. | "The Coastguard" | 2:42 |
| 15. | "Swinscoe Episode 2 - 'Release The Birds'" | 1:46 |
| 16. | "Farmland, Freeland" | 3:39 |
| 17. | "Everyday Electronics" | 3:20 |
| 18. | "The Old Schoolhouse" | 2:36 |
| 19. | "Callsign 'B' - Freeland Logotone" | 0:09 |
