= Somniloquy (EP) =

EP by Pram
- Released: 2001
- Genre: Avant-garde
- Label: Domino Records

Professional ratings
Review scores
Source	Rating
Pitchfork	6.8/10
RTÉ	2/5 stars
AllMusic	3.5/5 stars

Somniloquy is an EP by English band Pram.

== Track listing ==
1. "Mother of Pearl"
2. "The Way of the Mongoose"
3. "Monkey Puzzle"
4. "Clock Without Hands"
5. "Bewitched" (Plone Mix)
6. "Play of the Waves" (Balky Mule Mix)
7. "Omnichord" (Terry:Funken Mix)
8. "The Last Astronaut" (Andy Vtel Mix)
9. "A Million Bubble Burst" (Sir Real Mix)
