= As the Crow Flies (album) =

As The Crow Flies

Studio album by The Advisory Circle
- Released: 8 July 2011
- Genre: Electronic, musique concrète, acousmatic music, ambient
- Label: Ghost Box Music GBX015
- Producer: Cate Brooks

The Advisory Circle chronology
Other Channels (2008)	As The Crow Flies (2011)	From Out Here (2014)

As The Crow Flies is the third album by Cate Brooks, under the pseudonym of The Advisory Circle. It was preceded by the album Other Channels. The album was released on 8 July 2011 on the Ghost Box Music label. The CD sleeve notes and bonus digital booklet contains an introduction by professor Ronald Hutton, as well as a paragraph quoted from his book, The Stations of the Sun.

== Track listing ==
No.	Title	Length
1.	"Logotone I - Decisions"	0:15
2.	"Now Ends The Beginning"	3:28
3.	"Here! In The Wychwoods"	3:10
4.	"The Patchwork Explains"	2:54
5.	"Everyday Hazards"	2:49
6.	"Ceridwen"	1:16
7.	"As The Crow Flies"	4:27
8.	"Innocence Elsewhere"	1:31
9.	"Logotone II - The New Traffic Signs"	0:06
10.	"Modern Through Movement"	2:39
11.	"Learning Owl Reappears"	3:54
12.	"Further Starry Wisdom"	2:35
13.	"We Cleanse This Space"	2:37
14.	"Beyond The Wychelm"	4:35
15.	"Logotone III - Eyes Inside You"	0:09
16.	"Route Along 18 Corners"	2:52
17.	"Wheel Of The Year"	5:03
18.	"Unforgotten Path"	2:27
19.	"Lonely Signalman"	4:33
