= For Beginner Piano =

Studio album by Plone
- Released: 13 September 1999
- Recorded: 1999
- Genre: IDM, indietronica, space age pop
- Length: 39:25
- Label: Warp
- Producer: Plone

Singles from For Beginner Piano
- 1. "Press a Key" Released: 1997; 2. "Plock" Released: 1998

Professional ratings
Review scores
Source	Rating
AllMusic	4/5 stars
The Independent	HHHH
Pitchfork	5.4/10

For Beginner Piano is the debut studio album by British electronic band Plone. It was released on Warp in 1999.

== Critical reception ==
John Bush of AllMusic gave the album 4 stars out of 5, calling it "an enjoyable album, especially for those interested in the history of the synthesizer and tape music ('60s pioneers Perrey & Kingsley are probably the best reference point)." Tim Perry of The Independent said, "Plone mix warm electronica with a global sensibility." Ryan Schreiber of Pitchfork gave the album a 5.4 out of 10, saying: "Like so many songs being sold to hip marketing campaigns these days, you can listen to any of For Beginner Piano's ten tracks for hours without ever noticing they're there."

== Track listing ==
All tracks are written by Plone.

No.	Title	Length
1.	"On My Bus"	4:28
2.	"Top & Low Rent"	3:51
3.	"Plock"	3:57
4.	"Marbles"	3:50
5.	"Busy Working"	3:37
6.	"The Greek Alphabet"	3:47
7.	"Press a Key"	4:05
8.	"Bibi Plone"	2:54
9.	"Be Rude to Your School"	3:29
10.	"Summer Plays Out"	5:21

== Personnel ==
Credits adapted from liner notes.

- Plone – production
- Frank Arkwright – mastering
- The Designers Republic – design
- Deirdre O'Callaghan – photography
