= Dark Island (album) =

Studio album by Pram
- Released: 20 January 2003
- Genre: Avant-pop
- Length: 44:43
- Label: Domino

Pram chronology
The Museum of Imaginary Animals (2000)	Dark Island (2003)	The Moving Frontier (2007)

Professional ratings
Review scores
Source	Rating
AllMusic	4/5 stars
Drowned in Sound	8/10
Pitchfork	5.7/10

Dark Island is an album by English band Pram, released on 20 January 2003. The album contains the song "Track of the Cat", which was used on a BT advert in 2003.

== Track listing ==
All tracks by Pram

1. "Track of the Cat" – 4:13
2. "Penny Arcade" – 4:27
3. "The Pawnbroker" – 3:19
4. "Paper Hats" – 4:05
5. "Peepshow" – 3:28
6. "Sirocco" – 4:25
7. "The Archivist" – 6:01
8. "Goodbye" – 5:06
9. "Leeward" – 3:36
10. "Distant Islands" – 6:03

== Personnel ==
- Rosie Cuckston – vocals, keyboards, omnichord
- Matt Eaton – guitar, bass guitar, sampler, keyboards
- Sam Owen – bass guitar, guitar, keyboards, accordion, woodwind
- Max Simpson – keyboards, sampler
- Stephen Perkins – drums, percussion
- Laurence Hunt – drums, percussion
- Alex Clare – trumpet, trombone
- Nick Sales – keyboards, theremin, sampler
- Holly Simpson – violin
- Megan Bassett – violin
- Grandmaster Gareth – string arrangements
