= Across the Meridian =

Studio album by Pram
- Released: 20 July 2018
- Studio: Foel Studios, Wales
- Length: 45:40
- Label: Domino

Pram chronology
The Moving Frontier (2007)	Across the Meridian (2018)

Professional ratings
Aggregate scores
Source	Rating
Metacritic	74/100
Review scores
Source	Rating
AllMusic	4/5 stars
Loud and Quiet	5/10
Sputnikmusic	4.3/5

Across the Meridian is the eighth studio album by British band Pram. It was released in July 2018 by Domino Records. It is their first album in eleven years since The Moving Frontier (2007).

== Release ==
On 14 June 2018 Pram announced the release of the album, along with the first single "Shimmer and Disappear".

== Track listing ==
No.	Title	Length
1.	"Shimmer and Disappear"	3:15
2.	"Thistledown"	4:15
3.	"Electra"	4:19
4.	"Wave of Translation"	3:29
5.	"Shadow in Twilight"	2:27
6.	"Ladder to the Moon"	5:39
7.	"The Midnight Room"	2:39
8.	"Footprints Towards Zero"	3:36
9.	"Mayfly"	4:34
10.	"Sailing Stones"	4:06
11.	"Where the Sea Stops Moving"	3:22
12.	"Doll's Eyes"	4:00

== Core Personnel ==
- Matt Eaton – guitar, bass guitar, sampler, keyboards, percussion
- Sam Owen – bass guitar, guitar, keyboards, accordion, woodwind, percussion, vocals
- Max Simpson – keyboards, sampler, melodica
- Harry Dawes – trumpet, trombone, keyboards, theremin
