= From an Ancient Star =

Studio album by Belbury Poly
- Released: 2009
- Genre: Ambient, electronic music, musique concrète
- Label: Ghost Box Music GBX011
- Producer: Jim Jupp

Belbury Poly chronology
The Owl's Map (2006)	From an Ancient Star (2009)	The Belbury Tales (2012)

From an Ancient Star is the third studio album by Belbury Poly.

== Track listing ==
No.	Title	Length
1.	"Belbury Poly Logotone"	0:12
2.	"The Hidden Door"	5:09
3.	"From an Ancient Star"	4:58
4.	"A Year and a Day"	4:56
5.	"The All at Once Club"	3:47
6.	"Time Scale"	2:14
7.	"Adventures in a Miniature Landscape"	5:30
8.	"Widdershins"	3:21
9.	"A Great Day Out"	4:23
10.	"Clockwork Horoscope"	3:37
11.	"Remember Tomorrow"	4:47
12.	"Model Country"	3:31
13.	"Seed Ships"	3:07
