= Plone (band) =

English electronic music band

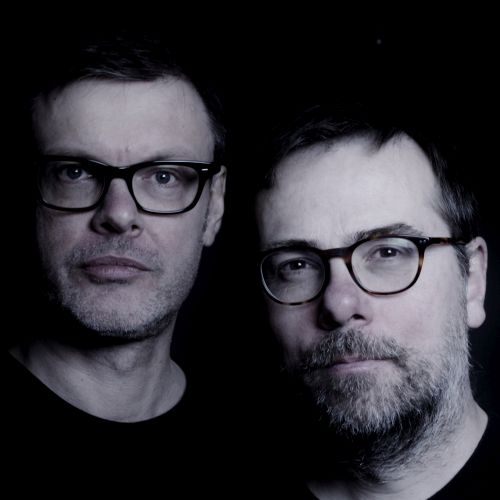
- Mike 'Billy' Bainbridge and Mike Johnston

Background information
- Origin: Birmingham, England
- Genres: Indietronica; psychedelia; downtempo; space age pop; ambient pop
- Years active: 1994–2001; 2019-present
- Labels: Warp; Matador; Ghost Box
- Members: Mike 'Billy' Bainbridge; Michael Johnston
- Past members: Mark Cancellara

Plone are an electronic music band from Birmingham, England, formed in late 1994 by Mark Cancellara and Mike Johnston.

== Career ==
Plone formed in late 1994 when Mark Cancellara and Mike Johnston started to buy old analogue keyboards and guitar effects units, and began to rehearse and make soundscapes under the name Rehab. Johnston was living with Billy Bainbridge (who was in another band at the time, Supernal, also containing members of electro band sol dat) who bought himself a keyboard and joined the band, changing their name to Plone.

The band started gigging as support to local bands such as Pram and Broadcast. In 1997, the band was approached by Wurlitzer Jukebox who released the single, "Press a Key". On the strength of this the band was signed to Warp and, in September 1998, released the single "Plock". This was tipped as one of the singles of the year by NME, Melody Maker and Dazed & Confused.

Rob Mitchell (who had originally signed the band to Warp) was diagnosed with cancer in 2001 and died in September that year, which caused their second album to never officially be released. Although never released, it has appeared on torrent and other file-sharing sites on the internet.

The software Plone was released in 2001, named after the band.

Bainbridge went on to play keyboards with Broadcast (on the 'Ha Ha Sound' tour), and is now a member of Seeland with Tim Felton (now also ex-Broadcast), and released a single "Wander" / "Pherox" on Duophonic in 2005. Johnston went on to form Mike in Mono, and is also 'Clive 2' in ZX Spectrum Orchestra and a member of the Modified Toy Orchestra.

Mark Cancellara is currently a magician's assistant and DJ.

Starting in the summer of 2009, Plone's song "Plaything" appeared on a Reese's Peanut Butter Cups commercial.

In October 2019, it was announced that Bainbridge and Johnston had reconvened as Plone and that a new album would be released on the Ghost Box label in 2020. On 25 February 2020 the new album was announced, named Puzzlewood and set to be released on 17 April. It is compiled from material recorded at various points since the “lost second album”, right up to the present day.

== Band members ==
- Mike 'Billy' Bainbridge
- Michael Johnston
- Mark Cancellara (no longer in Plone)

== Discography ==
=== Singles ===
- "Press A Key" (Wurlitzer Jukebox)
- "Plock" (Warp Records)

=== Albums ===
- For Beginner Piano (Warp Records) (1999)
- Puzzlewood (Ghost Box Records) (2020)

=== Remixes ===
- Warp 10+3 (2xCD) "Tricky Disco (Plone Remix)" (Warp Records)
- "Me And Jerry D" / "On Furry Cushion (Plone Mix)" (7") "On Furry Cushion (Plone Mix)" (Octave Kitten Recordings)
- Somniloquy (CD) "Bewitched (Plone Mix)" (Domino Recording Company Ltd.)

=== Tracks appeared on ===
- wap100. We Are Reasonable People (CD) "Plaything" (Warp Records)
- Round Squared: Weirdbag Vol. 1 (CD) "Somebody Is Alive And Well... Somewhere" (Round Records)
- For Wearing A Phone W/Q (CD) "Simple Song" (not on a label)
- The Mediterranean Beat Cook (Cassette) "Sunday Laid Moo" (Spotlight Records, Japan)
- Music Sampler (CD) "Plock", "Top & Low Rent" (Warp Records)
