= Ex Reverie =

American folk musician

Ex Reverie is the Philly-based, solo project of folk musician Gillian Chadwick.

Debut album The Door Into Summer features the production and musical collaboration of Greg Weeks and his wife Jessica. The act is signed to Greg and Jessica's Language of Stone record label. Additional contributors to Ex Reverie's sound are Ben McConnel, Margie Wienk, Art Difuria and Gillian's ex-husband, David Chadwick.

Gillian Chadwick has also performed with Jessica Weeks as Woodwose, and with Sharron Kraus as Rusalnaia, in addition to being a contributing member to the band Golden Ball, which she co-founded with her ex-husband.

== Discography ==
=== Albums ===
- The Door Into Summer (2008)
- Praxis (2011)
- Isobel Gowdie (2019)
