= Pram (band) =

English post-rock band

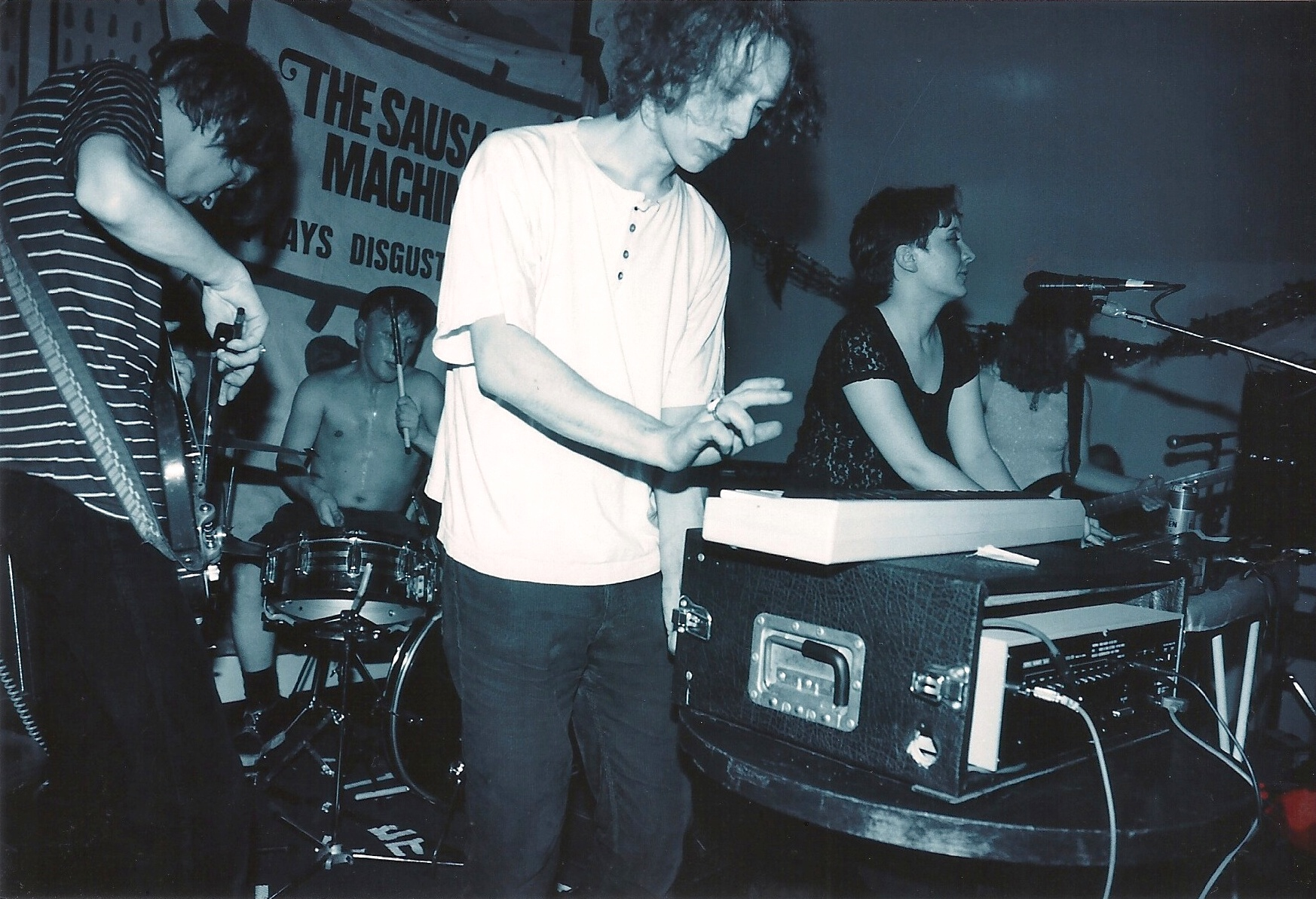
- Pram performing at the London Irish Centre in 1994

Background information
- Origin: Moseley, Birmingham, England
- Genres: Electronic pop; post-rock; experimental rock; avant-pop
- Years active: 1988–2008; 2016–present
- Labels: Howl; AE; Too Pure; Duophonic; Domino; Merge
- Members: Sam Owen; Matt Eaton; Max Simpson; Harry Dawes
- Past members: Rosie Cuckston; Laurence Hunt; Steve Perkins; Daren Garratt; Nick Sales; Alex Clare; Dave Turner; Mark Butterworth; Andy Weir; Hannah Baines; Mr. Verdigris Horn; The Colonel

Pram is an English post-rock/avant-pop band formed in Birmingham in 1988 by singer-keyboardist Rosie Cuckston, guitarist Matt Eaton, drummer Andy Weir and bassist Samantha Owen.

Subsequent lineups have changed frequently, most notably with Cuckston's departure in 2008. Their electronic pop sound, described by AllMusic as "equally quaint and unsettling," employs unconventional instruments and draws on stylistic influences such as krautrock, exotica, and dub.

The group signed to Too Pure Records in 1993, where they released their debut LP The Stars Are So Big, The Earth Is So Small... Stay as You Are. They later signed to Domino. Following the 2007 album The Moving Frontier, they took a lengthy hiatus, returning in 2018 with Across the Meridian.

== History ==
=== Early years ===
Rosie Cuckston, Matt Eaton and Andy Weir grew up together attending Harrogate Grammar School in Harrogate, North Yorkshire. In the late 1980s Cuckston and Eaton moved to Birmingham to study at Birmingham Polytechnic (now Birmingham City University), where Cuckston met Shropshire-born Samantha "Sam" Owen by chance (at a local supermarket's Singles Night). Weir had moved to London to study art, but kept in touch: in the meantime, Cuckston and Eaton played together in bands and got as far as recording in commercial studios, but Eaton would later recall that "the process didn’t lend itself to diversity and experimentation." In 1988, Weir reunited with the other three and they began playing music together in Birmingham under the temporary name Hole (at that point, performing solely with vocals and a homemade theremin).

Some time later Hole changed their name to Pram, with Cuckston singing and playing keyboards, Eaton mostly playing guitar, Weir drumming, and Owen playing bass guitar. A little later the group added a fifth member, Leeds Grammar School-educated Max Simpson, on keyboard and sampler. Over time, the various band members introduced their multi-instrumental skills to the project. Sam Owen and Matt Eaton frequently shared bass guitar and six-string guitar roles (as well as adding to the keyboards), while Owen also performed on various woodwind and reed instruments as well as singing backing vocals. The band were also quick to incorporate unusual instruments, including toys, into their sound - their performance and recording armoury included the theremin, a zither, a toy piano, a glass hammer, a glockenspiel, and a Hawaiian bubble machine.

Pram's name emphasised their unearthly, childlike tone and presentation, with Rosie Cuckston's eerie vocals and lyrics dealing with depression, loneliness and the dark side of childhood. The band's early recordings had a Krautrock-influenced blend of rhythmic guitar, keyboards and percussion which would eventually see them associated with the emerging post-rock genre, as would other elements of their work (although the band have rejected the label). The band was also inspired by multimedia and by memories of broadcast material: Sam Owen has commented that "in some ways film, animation, children's TV, Play for Today and public information broadcasts all lodged their spirit into our songs as much as the music we listened to.".

In 2011, Matt Eaton recalled "there was never any discussion at that time what the group would sound like. We appropriated some of the working methods of Can and Faust... if a piece had a similarity/reminded someone of another work it was generally rejected. The emphasis was on new. We were inspired a lot by groups like The Slits, and especially The Raincoats. They invented their own ways of playing music - that's a surefire way towards artistic fulfilment." Other cited influences on the nascent Pram included Sonic Youth, Pixies, My Bloody Valentine, The Fall, Big Black, The Residents and Alice Coltrane as well as various dub and bhangra artists.

=== Too Pure years ===
Pram's first mini-LP, Gash was self-released on their own label 'Howl Records' and sold by mail order and at gigs. While much harsher and more immediate than the band's subsequent recordings, it presented them as an experimental band and got them early attention from record labels.

Pram's growing reputation soon engaged the interest of Too Pure Records (then home to Stereolab, Mouse on Mars and PJ Harvey). Signing to Too Pure in 1993, Pram embarked on the release of several increasingly sophisticated recordings, the first of which was the Iron Lung EP.

Andy Weir left shortly after the release of the EP and was replaced as drummer by Daren Garratt, who would perform on all subsequent recordings until the dawn of the new millennium. This new line-up gelled instantly and would write, record and mix the band's debut album, 1993's The Stars Are So Big, The Earth Is So Small... Stay as You Are in time to meet their agreed, scheduled September release date. During the recording sessions, a trumpeter (credited only as "The Verdigris Horn") also joined the band and played on several album tracks, including the quarter-hour "In Dreams You Too Can Fly".

In April 1994, Pram released the Meshes EP, which was followed in September by their second album Helium. This record featured increasing use of the sampler. Pram's subsequent recordings began to show a marked interest in exotica.

Although their third album, 1995's Sargasso Sea, was awarded a rating of 0/10 when reviewed by the NME (which Pram took as a compliment), the band continued to gain momentum and popularity. Despite this, the band's sales were insufficient to save their business relationship with Too Pure, and the label dropped the band in late 1995. Pram have acknowledged that, despite the end of the business relationship, the label had always respected their artistic integrity and let them be themselves.

=== Between labels ===
For a couple of years, Pram performed and recorded without a long-term record deal. Their first release during this period was a 1995 self-released cassette compilation of early demos and live recordings called Perambulations.

The band's next EP, Music for Your Movies, was released in November 1996 through Stereolab's label Duophonic Records. It was followed by the vinyl-only "Omnichord/Sixty Years of Telephony" single on the small independent label Wurlitzer Jukebox Records. Another non-album single, "The Last Astronaut", was released in 1997 on the Kooky label. Also in 1997, the band expanded and reissued their debut EP Gash as a full-length album on the æ label, adding five tracks from Perambulations and doubling the length.

Pram's lineup changed several times during this period. A theremin player known only as "The Colonel" joined the band in 1996, bringing his own home-made theremin with him. By late 1997, Daren Garratt would be replaced on drums by Mark Butterworth, although pre-recorded material with Daren would continue to feature on records for the following two years. Former Long Fin Killie drummer Dave Turner would also have a stint with the band.

=== Domino years, Part 1 ===
By 1998, Pram had found a new home at Domino Records (distributed by Merge Records in the USA). Their fourth album, North Pole Radio Station (which had originally been recorded for release on Wurlitzer Jukebox before the label shut down) was released on Domino in March 1998. A related EP called Sleepy Sweet was released the following August.

In 1998, Pram recorded the soundtrack to Martin Davies of bolexbrothers 10-minute animated film "Keep in a Dry Place and Away From Children" and in 1999, they released it as an EP, including a remix by Mouse on Mars. Also in 1999, Domino collected various single and EP tracks from the previous two years and compiled them on the Telemetric Melodies compilation. These were the final recordings to feature Daren Garratt on drums (with the notable exceptions of the "Last Astronaut" 7", the Sleepy Sweet EP and around half of the tracks on the North Pole Radio Station album).

By 2000, three new members had joined Pram - former Broadcast drummer Steve Perkins, multi-instrumentalist Nick Sales (of the long-running Birmingham performance art group Blissbody) and trumpeter Alex Clare. All three performed on the band's fifth album, The Museum of Imaginary Animals which was released in 2000. The album featured the single "The Owl Service", named after the Alan Garner book of the same name.

The Somniloquy LP was released in 2001, featuring both new tracks and remixes of various recent album tracks and singles. Remix contributors were Andy Votel, fellow Brummie experimentalists Plone and Tele:funken (the latter credited as "Terry Funken").

=== Domino years, Part 2 (and Cuckston's departure) ===
Pram's sixth album - 2003's Dark Island - proved to be more of a breakthrough in terms of the band's profile. One of its songs, "Track of the Cat", was used on a BT Group advert. A remix of "Simon from Sydney/Untitled 2", commissioned by Warp Records, was used on Volkswagen's "30 years in the Making" advertising campaign. By now, the band's lineup had changed again. While Steve Perkins had drummed on three tracks on Dark Island, he was replaced during the sessions by Laurence Hunt. Trumpeter Hannah Baines (of Misty's Big Adventure) was briefly a member of the band for live performances in 2003. In spite of the relatively greater success of Dark Island, Pram did not release a new album for another four years.

In 2004, NME finally reversed their previous scathing opinion of Pram by tipping them as the next big band to watch out for.

In 2006, trombonist Harry Dawes (who also played theremin and stylophone) joined the band. By this time, both Sales and Clare had left for other projects.

In September 2007 Pram released their seventh studio album The Moving Frontier. It was named number 7 in Wire Magazine's Top Ten records of the year. A remix EP based on various Moving Frontier tracks, Prisoner of the Seven Pines, followed in 2008 as did a full self-released collection of the band's visual work (short films, music videos and animations), collated on a limited edition 90-minute DVD called Shadow Shows of the Phantascope These would be the band's last commercial releases for a decade.

Following the release of Prisoner of the Seven Pines and Shadow Shows of the Phantascope, Rosie Cuckston permanently left the band in 2008 to concentrate on academia (and, later, politics).

=== Release hiatus/work in other artistic areas ===
Partly as a consequence of Cuckston's departure, Pram went into a period of dormancy (as far as commercial releases were concerned) for almost a decade. The remaining band members worked on other projects, both separately and together.

In 2010 and 2001, Pram collaborated with visual artist "Film Ficciones" (filmmaker Scott Johnston) on a large scale multi platform show that used early cinematic techniques, shadow-play, theater and a live musical performance in silhouette to soundtrack a three-screen film produced by Johnston and the band. The piece "Shadow Shows" premiered at Supersonic Festival Birmingham, touring to Germany and then headlining the closing day of the Edinburgh International Film Festival in 2011.

In 2012 the group recorded a series of experimental works at Jochen Hans Irmler's Klangbad Studio, with the intention of releasing a new LP of experimental works.

As Pram, the group conducted workshops in sound art and field recording, producing as yet unreleased work that was performed live in 2016.

Now working as a semi-instrumental project, with an increased interest in film and site-specific work, the band performed at the Imaginary Musics festival in Switzerland in May 2017 (playing an audio-visual "Music for Kopfkino" set) and at a combined sound-art installation and concert ('Under the Blossom That Hangs On The Bough') in Birmingham's Martineau Gardens as part of the for-Wards project and festival for June 2017.

=== Return to album releases ===
In 2018 Pram released a new album, Across the Meridian, on Domino Records (with Sam Owen now handling vocals). The album was launched at a Club Integrale Midlands concert at the Edge, on 20 July 2018, followed by concerts at The Lexington, London, on 22 July and the Soup Kitchen, Manchester, on 26 July (with Fliss Kitson of The Nightingales playing drums).

During 2019 the band were working on further editing and arranging for the 2012 Klangbad Studio session recordings.

== Work as remixers ==
Pram remixed LFO and Aphex Twin for Warp Records' 10th anniversary compilation. They also remixed a song by the Indian singer Mohammed Rafi.

== Outside band activities ==
Rosie Cuckston recorded songs with Lætitia Sadier as Monade in the late 90s. She appeared on their "M Is The Thirteenth Letter/Monade" and "Split" singles.

Matt Eaton produces his own music under the name 'Micronormous' and has released a number of tracks on compilation albums - in Autumn 2009 he was reporting as working on an album for Warm Circuit records (home of the Modified Toy Orchestra). Eaton also DJs with Mark Cancellara (ex-Plone) at Silver Dollar, a reggae club in Birmingham.

Sam Owen and Max Simpson record and perform their own work as 'Moths of the Moon'. Their first mini-LP 'Another Place' was released in July 2021 on Ondes Positives Recordings.

== Band members ==
=== Current members ===
- Samantha "Sam" Owen (vocals, flute, clarinet, soprano saxophone, accordion, keyboards, melodica, guitar, bass guitar)
- Matthew Eaton (guitar, bass guitar, keyboards, sampler, strings)
- Max Simpson (sampler, keyboards, bass guitar, melodica, synthesisers)
- Harry Dawes (trombone, theremin, stylophone)

=== Live band members ===
- Fliss Kitson - drums (2018-present)

=== Past members ===
- Rosie Cuckston (vocals, keyboards)
- Laurence Hunt (drums)
- Andy Weir (drums)
- Daren Garratt (drums)
- Steve Perkins (drums)
- Nick Sales (zither, theremin, guitar, bass guitar, keyboards, sampler, melodica)
- Alex Clare (trumpet)
- Dave Turner (drums)
- Mark Butterworth (drums)
- Hannah Baines (trumpet, cello)
- "Mr. Verdigris Horn" (horns) AKA "Verdigris", "Mr. Verdigris", "Verdigris Al", "The Mysterious Verdigris Horn" (may possibly have been Alex Clare under a pseudonym)
- "The Colonel" (theremin)

== Discography ==
=== Studio Albums ===
Title	Details
The Stars Are So Big, the Earth Is So Small... Stay as You Are	Release date: 1993; Label: Too Pure; Format: CD, LP
Helium	Release date: 1994; Label: Too Pure; Format: CD, LP
Sargasso Sea	Release date: 1995; Label: Too Pure; Format: CD, LP, Cassette
North Pole Radio Station	Release date: 1998; Label: Domino; Format: CD, LP, Cassette
The Museum of Imaginary Animals	Release date: 2000; Label: Domino; Format: CD, LP, Cassette
Dark Island	Release date: 2003; Label: Domino; Format: CD, LP
The Moving Frontier	Release date: 2007; Label: Domino; Format: CD, LP
Across the Meridian	Release date: 2018; Label: Domino; Format: CD, LP

=== EPs ===
Title	Details
Gash	Release date: 1992; Label: Howl; Format: CD, LP
Iron Lung	Release date: 1993; Label: Too Pure; Format: CD, 12"
Meshes	Release date: 1994; Label: Too Pure; Format: CD, 12"
Music for Your Movies	Release date: 1996; Label: Duophonic; Format: CD, 12"
Keep in a Dry Place and Away From Children	Release date: 1999; Label: Domino; Format: CD, 12"; Soundtrack to the short film of the same name.
Somniloquy	Release date: 2001; Label: Domino; Format: CD, LP
Prisoner of the Seven Pines	Release date: 2008; Label: Domino; Format: CD, 12"

=== Singles ===
List of singles as lead artist, showing year released and album name
Title	Year	Album
"Omnichord"	1996	North Pole Radio Station
"Sleepy sweet"	1998	North Pole Radio Station
"The Last Astronaut"	1998	Non-album single
"The Owl Service"	2000	The Museum of Imaginary Animals

=== Compilations ===
Title	Details
Perambulations	Release date: 1995; Label: Howl Record; Format: Cassette
Telemetric Melodies	Release date: 1999; Label: Domino; Format: CD, LP

=== Videos ===
Title	Details
Shadow Shows of the Phantascope	Release date: 2008; Label: Self-released; Format: DVD

=== Compilation appearances ===
- Brum Brum (1989, Pram's song "Jack Sabbath" appears on this compilation, along with other Brummie bands)
- In The Light Of Time: UK Post-Rock and Leftfield Pop 1992 - 1998 (Jumbo Records, 2023)
