= The Music of Erich Zann =

1921 short story by H. P. Lovecraft

- Short story by H. P. Lovecraft
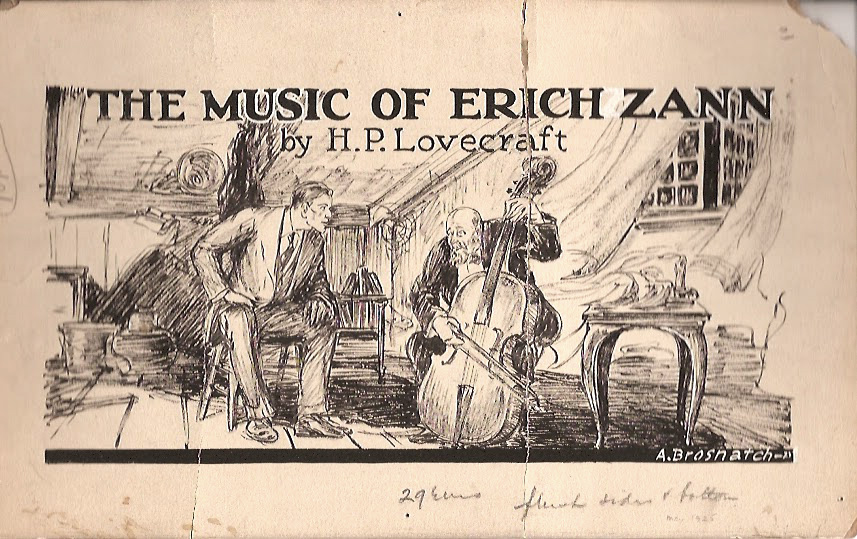
- The Music of Erich Zann

Text available at Wikisource
- Country: United States
- Language: English
- Genre: Horror

Publication
- Publisher: The National Amateur
- Media type: Magazine
- Publication date: March 1922

"The Music of Erich Zann" is a horror short story by American author H. P. Lovecraft. Written in December 1921, it was first published in National Amateur, March 1922.

The story is an account of the enigmatic Erich Zann, an elderly musician whose unique and unworldly melodies draw the curiosity of a young university student.

== Plot ==
Due to lack of funds, a student studying metaphysics abroad is forced to take up lodging in a cheap apartment building on a street named the "Rue d'Auseil". The street is not far from his university and is bordered by a river, dark warehouses and a large wall, and is described as being very steeply inclined, as if being on a cliff. The student cannot see what lies on the other side of the wall, as only a single window on the top floor of his building looks over it. Along with the building's disabled landlord, Blandot, one of the few other tenants is an old German man named Erich Zann. The old man is mute and plays the viol (Note: Although Zann's instrument is often depicted as a violin (see "Influence" below), Lovecraft's intended use of this term appears to be to refer to a violoncello: in a letter to Elizabeth Toldridge (October 31, 1931?) he describes Zann as a "'cellist".) with a local theater orchestra. He lives alone on the top floor and at night he plays strange melodies the student has never heard before.

Despite Zann's reclusiveness, Blandot reveals his identity to the student, who approaches him in the hallway one evening and asks if he can listen to Zann's music. Zann allows the student to enter his room. He plays for the student some of his unique melodies but not the same as the student had previously heard. The student asks him if he could play his music from the previous nights, awkwardly humming and whistling the notes he remembered. Zann is taken aback by the request and nervously glances at the window in his room, covered by curtains. The student recognizes the window as the only one that can oversee the wall at the end of the mysterious street. He approaches it to look outside but Zann angrily pulls him back. The student is fed up with Zann's eccentricities but Zann explains through writing that he is simply a lonely old man, and suffers from numerous phobias and nervous disorders. He is pleased that the student likes his music, but refuses to play the particular tunes that the student asked for. He persuades the student to move to a lower floor in the apartment as he would prefer the student not listen to them. The student sympathizes with Zann and agrees to move. Zann promises that he will invite the student to his room to hear his other music. After the student moves, however, Zann returns to his antisocial behavior and his health deteriorates, eventually not letting the student listen at all.

The student's curiosity to hear the secret music and look out the window grows, and he begins eavesdropping on Zann while he plays at night. His melodies have an unearthly sound, and the student praises Zann as a musical genius. One night while secretly listening outside Zann’s room, the student hears a commotion and the old man scream inside. When the student bangs at the door, Zann lets him in and asks him to wait while he writes, promising to explain everything. More than an hour into writing, Zann is startled by a distant sound in the form of a low note, interrupts his writing and starts furiously playing his viol with a crescent terror. The music is horrific and the student surmises that Zann is playing wildly to drown out or keep something out of the room. Zann seemingly enters a stupor, doing nothing but playing his music. Another sound from outside the room, which the student perceives to be mocking them, is heard and a gust shatters the window. The unnatural wind sweeps through the room, blowing Zann's unread papers out the window, despite the student's attempts at catching them. The student remembers his curiosity and finally looks out the window. Instead of seeing the city lights, he only sees a terrible black void, an infinite abyss of chaos.

The howling winds and cacophony of elements snuff out the candles in the room, leaving the student and Zann in complete darkness. He blindly moves through the dark with desperation, and feels a "chill thing" brush up against him. Determined to save Zann, the student reaches the musician and screams at him to run, but Zann only continues to play his music. Upon attempting to physically carry him to safety, he discovers Zann is dead, although his body is still playing. With this realization, the student bolts for the door, frantically fleeing the apartment and entire neighborhood. He only realizes afterward that the sky was calm and the city lights were shining.

Writing an account of the incident years later, the student states that despite his best efforts, he has never again been able to find the Rue d'Auseil. It does not appear on any maps, and it seems no one else has even heard of it. But he feels a degree of relief that he cannot find the street, or the lost papers that could have explained the music of Erich Zann.

== Setting ==
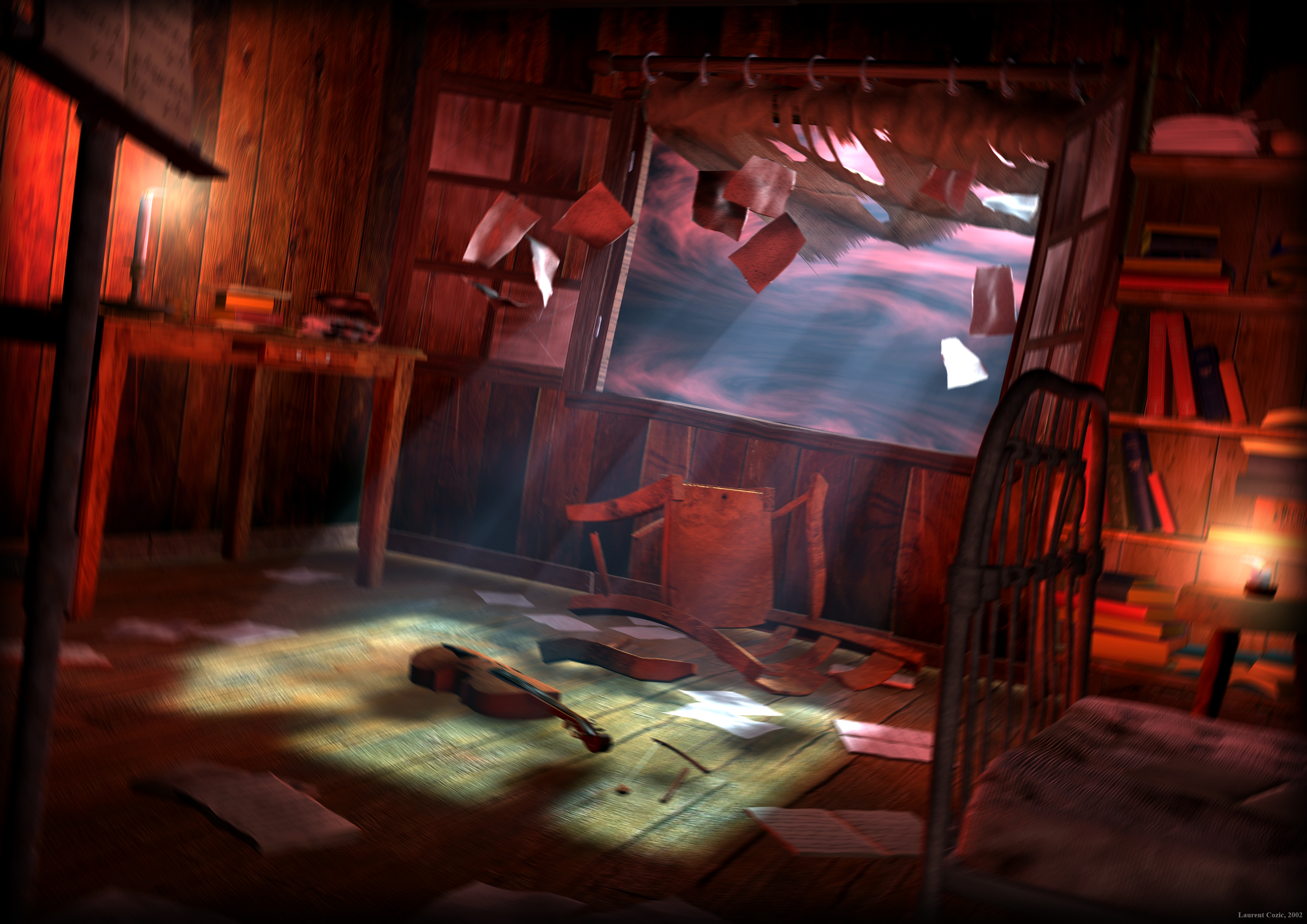
An artist's depiction of Zann's room

The setting of the story is presumably France or another French-speaking country, sometime in the late-19th or early-20th century, though the exact location and date are never named. Auseil is not a true French word, but it has been suggested that Lovecraft derived it from the phrase au seuil, meaning at the threshold. Auseil is read like oseille, meaning sorrel or, colloquially, money. The identity of the student is never elaborated upon, only that he is a foreigner like Zann and studies metaphysics.

== Reactions ==
Lovecraft considered "The Music of Erich Zann" one of his best stories, in part because it avoided the overexplicitness that he saw as a major flaw in some of his other work. An H. P. Lovecraft Encyclopedia notes that it "might, however, be said that HPL erred on the side of underexplicitness in the very nebulous horror to be seen through Zann's garret window."

The story was frequently anthologized even during Lovecraft's lifetime, including in Dashiell Hammett's 1931 collection Creeps by Night. Ramsey Campbell has stated that "The Music of Erich Zann" was "the single Lovecraft story that the late Robert Aickman liked". Campbell himself used only "The Music of Erich Zann" when creating the Folio Book of Horror Stories.

== Influence ==
=== Comics ===
- A comic book adaption was released in 1993 by Caliber Press. It apparently incorporates vistas and creatures described in The Dreams in the Witch House in the story including the eponymous Erich Zann encountering Nyarlathotep in flashbacks.

=== Literature ===
- James Wade wrote a sequel to the story, "The Silence of Erika Zann", first published in The Disciples of Cthulhu (1976).
- The story is illustrated by Barry Moser as part of the 1998 children's book, Great Ghost Stories.
- In Charles Stross's The Laundry Files novels series including The Jennifer Morgue, The Fuller Memorandum, The Apocalypse Codex, The Rhesus Chart, and The Annihilation Score one of the characters has a violin made by an "Erich Zahn" which is made from human bones and, when played, eats the soul of the intended victim.

=== Film ===
- Leigh Blackmore scripted a short film version in 1975; however, the script was never filmed.
- Ernest Dickerson's segment in V/H/S/Mixtape (2026), "The Music of Mr. Sze," is an adaptation of the story.

=== Music ===
- American composer Raymond Wilding-White created a piece in 1980 by the same title for violin and electronics, with Eugene Gratovich of DePaul University in the role of the university student.
- Univers Zéro's album Ceux du dehors (1981) includes a track titled "La musique d'Erich Zann". According to drummer and bandleader Daniel Denis, all members read the short story in the studio and promptly improvised the piece.
- German technical thrash metal band Mekong Delta titled their 1988 second album The Music of Erich Zann after the story.
- British Anarcho-punk band Rudimentary Peni featured a depiction of Eric Zann on the original cover of their 1988 album Cacophony.
- Hungarian Metal band Without Face has a song called "The Violin of Erich Zann" on the 2002 album Astronomicon.
- Japanese jazz-rock band Fragile's album ZANN is probably a reference to this story.
- German ambient band Forma Tadre titled their 2008 album The Music of Erich Zann.
- Greek death metal band Septic Flesh references the story in the song "Lovecraft's Death" on their 2008 album Communion.
- American thrash metal band Revocation song "Madness Opus" off their 2014 album Deathless is based on off The Music of Erich Zann.
- Eric Zann is a pseudonym of Jim Jupp, who has released an album on the Ghost Box Music record label.
- French composer Claude Ballif wrote stage music of the same title.
- The Darkest of the Hillside Thickets' 2017 album The Dukes of Alhazred included a track titled Erich Zann.
- I Monster's 2017 album A Dollop of HP illustrated four of Lovecraft's short stories including The Music of Erich Zann, narrated by David Yates.

=== Games ===
- Yahtzee Croshaw based a small indie game called The Life of Erich Zann on H.P. Lovecraft's short story, as part of a "12 Games in 12 Months" series of videos for The Escapist.

== Sources ==
- Lovecraft, Howard P. (1984) [1925]. "The Music of Erich Zann". In S. T. Joshi (ed.). The Dunwich Horror and Others (9th corrected printing ed.). Sauk City, WI: Arkham House. ISBN 0-87054-037-8. Definitive version.
- Harksen, Henrik. Metaphysics in "The Music of Erich Zann" . Denmark: H. Harksen Productions, 2003 for the Esoteric Order of Dagon Amateur Press Association Mailing No 123 (July 2003).
