= The Willows (album) =

Studio album by Belbury Poly
- Released: 2004
- Genre: Electronic, musique concrète, ambient
- Label: Ghost Box Music GBX003
- Producer: Jim Jupp

Belbury Poly chronology
Farmer's Angle (2004)	The Willows (2004)	The Owl's Map (2006)

The Willows is an album by Jim Jupp, under the pseudonym of Belbury Poly. The album was released in 2004 on the Ghost Box Music label. It is named after a short story by Algernon Blackwood.

== Track listing ==
No.	Title	Length
1.	"Wildspot"	1:25
2.	"The Willows"	4:43
3.	"Caermaen"	3:41
4.	"A Thin Place"	5:41
5.	"Farmer's Angle"	4:36
6.	"Insect Prospectus"	5:06
7.	"A Warning"	1:06
8.	"Monstroon"	4:27
9.	"Thorn"	4:14
10.	"The Absolute Elsewhere"	4:05
11.	"Far Off Things"	4:34
