= We Are Reasonable People =

Compilation album by various artists
- Released: 29 June 1998
- Genre: IDM, electronic
- Length: 59:56
- Label: Warp Records

Professional ratings
Review scores
Source	Rating
AllMusic	4/5 stars
Music Week	positive

We Are Reasonable People is a compilation album released by Warp Records on 29 June 1998. The title of the album is a backronym of WARP. It reached number 14 on the UK R&B Albums Chart.

== Critical reception ==
Music Week gave the album a positive review, writing that it would "certainly appeal to existing fans and act as a good introduction to anyone interested in the sound of the underground". Brainwashed listed We Are Reasonable People as the third-best compilation album of 1998. In 2013, Fact placed "Freeman Hardy & Willis Acid" at number 10 on their list of the 50 best Aphex Twin tracks.

== Track listing ==
No.	Title	Artist(s)	Length
1.	"Freeman Hardy & Willis Acid"	Squarepusher/AFX	5:42
2.	"Orange Romeda"	Boards of Canada	4:51
3.	"Hammer Without a Master"	Broadcast	4:58
4.	"Ilasas"	Plaid	4:23
5.	"Stop Look Listen"	Autechre	7:26
6.	"Fishtail Parker"	Nightmares on Wax	5:08
7.	"Wear My Bikini"	Jimi Tenor	4:13
8.	"Plaything"	Plone	4:14
9.	"4 Dead Monks (Original Demo)"	Red Snapper	5:06
10.	"Umchunga Locks"	Mira Calix	4:51
11.	"Circulation"	Two Lone Swordsmen	6:53
12.	"A Salute to Those People Who Say Fuck You"	Mark Bell	5:50

== Charts ==
Chart	Peak position
UK R&B Albums (OCC)	14
