= Sargasso Sea (Pram album) =

Studio album by Pram
- Released: August 1995
- Recorded: Third Sex Studios in Birmingham, England
- Genre: Neo-psychedelia
- Length: 45:12
- Label: Too Pure
- Producer: Pram

Pram chronology
Helium (1994)	Sargasso Sea (1995)	Music for Your Movies (1996)

Sargasso Sea is an album by the English band Pram, released in 1995.

== Critical reception ==
Professional ratings
Review scores
Source	Rating
AllMusic	4/5 stars
Robert Christgau	(dud)
NME	–
Orlando Sentinel	5/5 stars

The Orlando Sentinel wrote that the "cinematic sweep of Pram's work is sometimes reminiscent of Portishead, but there's more hallucinatory detail." The Colorado Daily stated that "as vocalist Rosie Cuckston breathes out her melodies, wavy synths, tight snare hits and funky bass lines move the songs along, taking the listener on an undersea adventure." In his 2023 interview with Pram, Brett Abrahamsen referred to the album as "a masterpiece" and "one of the most fascinating albums of the modern era".

== Track listing ==
All lyrics are written by Rosie Cuckston; all music is composed by Pram.

No.	Title	Length
1.	"Loose Threads"	4:59
2.	"Little Scars"	4:25
3.	"Earthing and Protection"	3:44
4.	"Cotton Candy"	5:29
5.	"Three Wild Georges"	4:57
6.	"Serpentine"	6:04
7.	"Crystal Tips"	3:46
8.	"Crooked Tiles"	3:41
9.	"Eels"	1:52
10.	"Sea Swells and Distant Squalls"	6:12

== Personnel ==
- Rosie Cuckston – vocals, keyboards
- Matt Eaton – guitar, bass guitar, sampler, keyboards
- Sam Owen – guitar, bass guitar, keyboards
- Max Simpson – keyboards, sampler
- Daren Garratt – drums, percussion
- Mr Verdigris Horn – trumpet
- Pram – recording
