= Moon Wiring Club =

Moon Wiring Club is the recording alias of Ian Hodgson, who releases his music on his own label Blank Workshop.

== Discography ==
- An Audience of Art Deco Eyes (2007)
- Shoes Off and Chairs Away (2008)
- Striped Paint for the Last Post (2009)
- A Spare Tabby at the Cat's Wedding (2010)
- Somewhere a Fox is Getting Married (2011)
- Clutch It Like a Gonk (2011)
- Today Bread, Tomorrow Secrets (2012)
- Always a Party (2013)
- Leporine Pleasure Gardens (2014)
- A Fondness for Fancy Hats (2015)
- Why Does My House Make Creaking Noises? (2015)
- Playclothes from Faraway Places (2015)
- Exit Pantomime Control (2016)
- Tantalising Mews (2017)
- Cateared Chocolatiers (2018)
- Psychedelic Spirit Show (2018)
- Ghastly Garden Centres (2019)
- Cavity Slabs (2019)
- Tabitha Reverb (2020)
- Jass of Thun (2020)
- The Most Unusual Cat in the Village (2020)
- The Only Cat Left in Town (2021)
- Ghost Party Delirium (2021)
- Medieval Ice Cream (2022)
- Sepia Cat City (2023)
- Cat Location Conundrum (2024)
- Gruesome Shrewd (2025)

== See also ==
- Ghost Box Records#Singles & EPs
- Hauntology (music)
