= Stylenoir =

Stylenoir is a British magazine published since 2013. The magazine had been online based since 2008, but launched print issues in May 2013. The magazine regularly features art, culture, and the darker aesthetics of fashion.

== History ==
Stylenoir Magazine was launched in May 2008 as an independent online magazine, joining the Glam Media publishing network later that year. Stylenoir quickly became known for its edgy design and aesthetic. In 2010 Stylenoir won the Jaeger (clothing) styling competition and pushed a focus on its original mission of bringing dark culture and style to the high fashion industry. In 2013 Stylenoir launched into print, publishing two issues a year.

Stylenoir is edited by James Joseph. Cover Stars have included actor Luke Newberry and singer Kyla La Grange. Interview subjects include Ève Salvail, Naomi Grossman and costume designer for The Girl with the Dragon Tattoo (2011 film), Trish Summerville.

== Technology ==
Stylenoir Magazine is seen as a pioneer for technology in new media. The prominent reason for this is Stylenoir's iPad and iPhone magazine downloads, alongside the magazine's Twitter and Facebook page . This has prompted Stylenoir and editor James Joseph to be featured in Marketing Magazine and Brand Republic.
