= Mount Vernon Arts Lab =

Scottish musical project

- Origin: Glasgow, Scotland
- Genres: Electronic rock, post-rock, psychogeographic rock
- Years active: 1996–present
- Labels: Earworm, Via Satellite, Ochre, Eskaton
- Members: Drew Mulholland

Mount Vernon Arts Lab is a musical project of the Scottish musician Drew Mulholland, who has also recorded as Black Noise and N. Between 1996 and 2001, a string of EPs, singles, and albums were released. After this he continued to release material as Mount Vernon Astral Temple.

== History ==
Taking inspiration from Joe Meek, and from Daniel Miller's work as The Normal, Mulholland began creating avant-garde/post-rock recordings in 1996, and soon found the support of independent labels such as Via Satellite and Earworm, who between them issued a series of vinyl-only releases during 1997 and 1998. Mulholland used a range of electronic and acoustic instruments including Moog synthesizers, theremin, and a specially-built unit which he calls a "Turbine Generator". The debut mini-album, Gummy Twinkle, was issued in September 1998, featuring guest appearances from Pete Kember (a.k.a. Sonic Boom) and Norman Blake of Teenage Fanclub. He then signed a deal with Ochre Records, who issued his second mini-set, a collaboration with Adrian Utley of Portishead, featuring a single 23-minute track, "Warminster". A second mini-set followed for Ochre, this time recorded 100 feet below ground in the abandoned nuclear bunker at Troywood. A final album as Mount Vernon Arts Lab was released in 2001 on Via Satellite; The Séance at Hobs Lane was inspired by "Victorian skullduggery, outlaws, secret societies and subterranean experiences", and featured guest appearances from Blake, Utley, Isobel Campbell, and Barry 7 (of Add N to (X)). It has been described as "a music distilled from the nuclear age". Mulholland released further work under the name Mount Vernon Astral Temple, including Musick That Destroys Itself (2003), Bent Sinister By Sound (2005).

Many of MVAL's tracks are inspired by historical locations, and Mulholland has been described as the "godfather" of psychogeographic rock, and the inspiration for the Ghost Box Music record label.

Mulholland went on to become the composer-in-residence at Glasgow University's geography department.

In 2009, Mulholland and Utley again collaborated, with a performance at the Le Weekend festival in Stirling.

== Discography ==
=== Singles, EPs ===
- Nova EP (1997), Via Satellite
- "Window" (1997), Earworm – split with Omit
- Talvin Stardust EP (1997), Via Satellite
- William Green EP (1998), Via Satellite
- "Imber" (1998), Earworm – one-sided 7-inch single, split with Electroscope

=== Albums ===
- Gummy Twinkle (1998), Via Satellite
- Warminster (1999), Ochre – with Adrian Utley
- One Minute Blasts Rising to Three and then Diminishing (2000), Ochre
- The Séance at Hobs Lane (2001), Via Satellite (Note: rereleased in 2008 on Ghost Box Records)
- Musick That Destroys Itself (2003), Eskaton (Note: as Mount Vernon Astral Temple)
- Untitled (2003), Eskaton
- Bent Sinister by Sound (2005), Further – CDR-only issue, limited to 33 copies

Compilations

- E for Experimental (1999), Ochre

=== Compilation appearances, split releases ===
- Creeping Bent Singles Club 7" (1997), Creeping Bent – "Bad Vibrations" (Mount Vernon Arts Lab deconstructed by Scientific Support Dept.)
- Just Like Jeff 7-inch, Boa Records – "Sky Men" (Electroscope with Mount Vernon Arts Lab)
- After Hours (1997), After Hours – "The Mind Field"
- Spooky Sounds of Now (1997), Vesuvius – "Scooby Don't"
- Sunday 14 Sept.. '97 (1997), Enraptured – "Automatic Frequency Control"
- Electronic Lullabies (1998), Creeping Bent – "MV 3"
- The Battle of Bosworth (1998), Trunk – "Electroluminessence"
- Bentism – The Underground Sounds of Creeping Bent (1999), Creeping Bent – "Remix" (remix by Scientific Support Dept.)
- 271199 (2000), Ochre – "Abstracts"
- Infrasonic Waves (2001), Ochre – "Broadcasting"
- The Electronic Bible Chapter 1 (2004), White Label Music – "Hobgoblins" (Coil remix), "The Hackney Homonculus" (as N)
- Not Alone (2006), Durtro/Jnana – "The Postal Workers Night Out" (Note: as Black Noise)
- Electric Brain Storms Vol.1 (2008), The Pod Room (podcast by Future Sound of London) – "Mv3"
- Ritual And Education (2008), Ghost Box – "The Black Drop", "The Submariner's Song"
- Infrasonic Waves Volume III 7-inch EP, Ochre – "Broadcasting"
