= Misty's Big Adventure =

English band

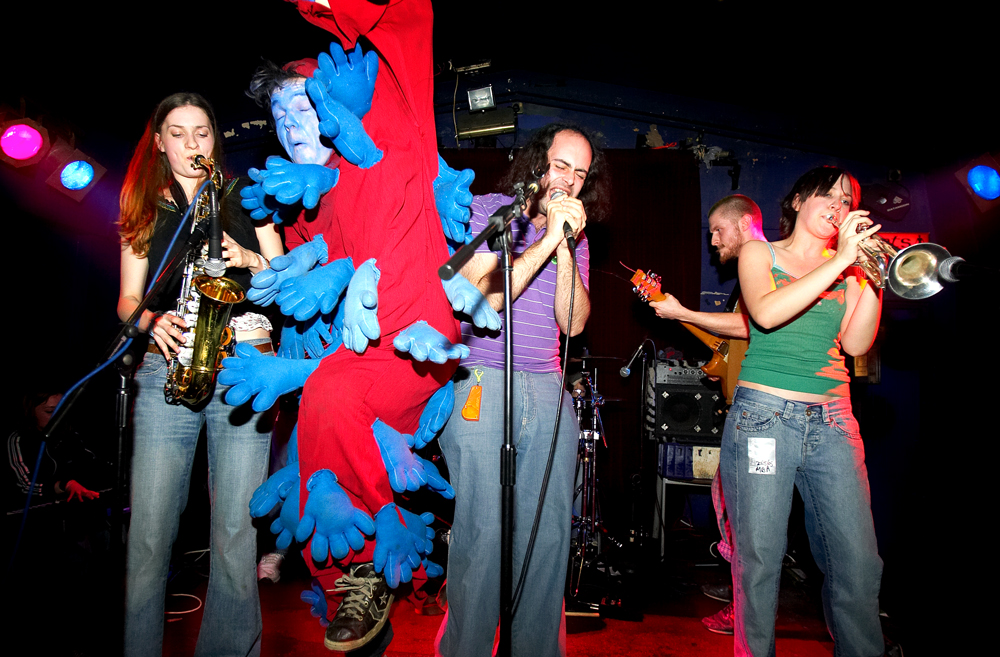
- Misty's Big Adventure

Background information
- Origin: Birmingham, England
- Years active: 1996–2022
- Labels: Awkward Records; SL Records; Grumpy Fun Recordings; Psychotron Records
- Past members: Gareth Jones; Matt Jones; Sam Minnear; Jonathan Kedge; Hannah Baines; Lucy Baines; Lucy Bassett; Erotic Volvo; DJ Feva
- Website: http://www.mistysbigadventure.com

Misty's Big Adventure were an English indie pop band, formed in 1996 in Birmingham by singer-songwriter Gareth Jones (AKA Grandmaster Gareth). Their music incorporated elements of jazz, lounge, psychedelia, 2 tone, pop and punk.

The band was composed of singer and sole songwriter Gareth Jones (AKA Grandmaster Gareth), bassist (and brother) Matt Jones, drummer Sam Minnear, guitarist Jonathan Kedge, trumpet player Hannah Baines, saxophone player Lucy Baines, keyboardist Lucy Bassett and dancer Erotic Volvo.

Commenting on the band's lack of commercial success, Gareth admitted that "some people can't see past the novelty aspect. There's a part of me that just wants to make people laugh. Being grumpy, but finding the fun in grumpy."

On 19 May 2022, it was announced via social media that frontman Gareth Jones had died on 15 May 2022, the day after the band had headlined the Hare & Hounds venue in their hometown of Birmingham.

== About the band ==
A long time fixture on the Birmingham experimental music scene, Gareth Jones formed the band in 1996 with his friend Sam Minnear. Originally called Misty's Big Adventure In The Snow, the name was taken from a story in the 1968 children's book The Magic Roundabout Annual about a kitten, Misty, who meets a dog with whom she becomes friends. Commenting on the band setup with him writing all the songs including brass parts, Jones stated that "when people joined it was always on the proviso that I would write the parts and they'd play them".

The band's songs typically consist of Jones singing in a deadpan, maudlin style accompanied by lively guitar, keyboards and brass players. They occasionally include samples and toy instruments in their songs. Contrasting with Jones' dour lounge-singer act is the dancer Erotic Volvo. Dressed in a loose, full-body red sack with numerous stuffed blue gloves attached, and his face painted purple, he dances continuously and in a frantic manner, often moving around the audience. He occasionally also performs as a human beat box.

All members of the band were trained musicians, and were predominantly based in the Moseley suburb of Birmingham. The band's home venue was the Jug of Ale in Moseley, where they played regularly until it was shut down in 2008; fittingly, Misty's played the last ever gig held there. They have played widely outside Birmingham too and since 2005 had toured extensively around the UK with forays into Europe, and supported The Zutons and The Magic Numbers. During the early 2000s they were managed by Mathew Priest, the drummer with Dodgy.

Their debut album, Misty's Big Adventure and Their Place in the Solar Hi-Fi System, was released in 2004, produced by Richard March of Bentley Rhythm Ace and Matthew Eaton of Pram. Their follow-up albums, The Black Hole (2005) and Funny Times (2007), were produced by Brian O'Shaughnessy whose production credits include Primal Scream, Denim and The Firm's "Star Trekkin'."

Jones occasionally toured as Misty's Little Adventure with a stripped-down band, featuring himself on guitar, backed only by drums, trumpet and saxophone.

In 2003, Jones recorded the solo album Grandmaster Gareth Presents... An Introduction To Minute Melodies. This was accompanied by a John Peel session entitled "Grandmaster Gareth's Monster Melody," a CDR EP which was available for purchase from the band's website. A second album of one-minute melodies, The Party Sounds of Grandmaster Gareth, was released on SL Records in May 2006. This featured 29 tracks varying in length from 47 seconds to 1 minute 29 seconds. The bonus track "Monster Melody" (different from the version in their Peel session) was also included to end the album. Contributors to this album included the other members of Misty's, Brute Force, Jeffrey Lewis, Dog Food's Mr Simon and Bom & His Magic Drumstick.

The humourist Dave Gorman is a fan of Misty's Big Adventure, and the DVD The Dave Gorman Collection features a special song and video as an extra. The song is titled "54 Dave Gormans". The band also provided the theme tune to his TV series Genius.

In 2007 the BBC used the instrumental version of "Fashion Parade" as the music to their The Edwardians trailer, while ITV used the same version in their trailer for their reality show This Is David Gest. On radio, the instrumental version was used by The Geoff Show on Virgin Radio as backing music to one of their regular features. It has also been used as the soundtrack to an Irish anti-litter campaign.

In 2019 the band released the 2LP & CD best of compilation The Young Person's Guide to Misty's Big Adventure, which was compiled by frontman Gareth Jones.

In April 2022 the band embarked on a short English tour. The first 2 dates of the tour in Birmingham & London were postponed due to illness, with the rescheduled Birmingham show taking place on 14 May 2022. On 19 May 2022, it was announced via the band's official Facebook account that frontman Gareth Jones had committed suicide on 15 May 2022, the day after the band's last show. The London show, which had been postponed to 3 July 2022 was cancelled.

The band were in the process of completing their 6th studio album, which was to be entitled The Brain Cupboard. The band had started work on the planned 13 track album in 2011, but in January 2018 frontman Gareth Jones revealed that plans for the album had been put to one side due to a "remarkable run of brain crushing events".

== Influences ==
Gareth Jones cited local Birmingham bands Pram, Broadcast, Dog Food and Novak as teenage influences. Seven-piece Novak had an "anything goes" attitude combined with skilled musicianship that Misty's exhibit. Other influences include Raymond Scott, Julian Cope, The Beatles, The Specials, Joe Meek and Can.

== Other projects and associations ==
Gareth Jones worked as producer with anti-folk artist Jeffrey Lewis during 2004. Some of these recordings are featured on City and Eastern Tapes (2008).

Misty's 2006 single "Fashion Parade" features 3/4 of Northampton indie-punk rockers The Retro Spankees and a guest appearance by Noddy Holder. The music video features The Teats.

== Discography ==
=== Albums ===
Title	Year	Label
Misty's Big Adventure and Their Place in the Solar Hi-fi System	2004	SL Records
The Black Hole	2005	SL Records/T.A.R.G.O. Records
Funny Times	2007	Grumpy Fun Recordings
Television's People	2008	Grumpy Fun Recordings/SL Records
The Family Amusement Centre	2011	Grumpy Fun Recordings

=== Compilations ===
Title	Year	Label
Allsorts	2003	self released
Grumpy Fun	2006	self released
Grumpier Fun	2007	Grumpy Fun Recordings
Grumpiest Fun	2010	Grumpy Fun Recordings
Lumpy Fun	2014	Grumpy Fun Recordings
The Young Person's Guide to Misty's Big Adventure	2019	Psychotron Records

=== Singles ===
Title	Year	Label
"I am Cool with a Capital C"	2004	Awkward Records
"Night Time Better Than the Daytime/I Killed the Neighbours"	2004	Awkward Records
"Hey Man"	2005	SL Records
"The Story of Love"	2005	SL Records
"Evil"	2005	SL Records
"Where Do Jam Jars Go at Xmas Time"	2005	SL Records
"Fashion Parade"	2006	Sunday Best Records
"I Can't Bring The Time Back/Serious Thing"	2007	Club Fandango Records
"Between Me and You"	2008	Club Fandango Records
