= From Out Here =

Studio album by The Advisory Circle
- Released: 5 December 2014
- Genre: Acousmatic music Ambient; Electronic; Musique concrète
- Label: Ghost Box Music GBX021

The Advisory Circle chronology
As the Crow Flies (2011)	From Out Here (2014)

From Out Here is a 2014 album by Cate Brooks, under the pseudonym of The Advisory Circle. It was released on 5 December 2014 by independent record label Ghost Box Music on CD, online download, and 12" vinyl record. The album cover art was designed by Julian House.

== Concept ==
Ghost Box Music's press release for From Out Here "hints at a Wyndham-esque science fiction story, where bucolic English scenery is being manipulated and maybe even artificially generated by bizarre multi-dimensional computer technology."

== Reception ==
Chicago Reader said From Out Here "exceeds all of my expectations—it's among the best work Brooks has ever done, and one of the finest albums of the year." DJ Food called the album "[Cate Brooks'] best yet" and "my favourite though as it embodies everything I love about the [Ghost Box Music] label" Pitchfork reviewed From Out Here with "[f]or a notionally darker work this album ends up being more enjoyable than some of [Cate Brooks'] prior records, mainly because the sense of exploration is heightened with each turn taken."

The Quietus called From Out Here a "particularly satisfying and coherent listening experience" and "beautifully crafted voyage into electronic music's substrata." Record Collector reviewed From Out Here with "Brooks, though, stands out by dint of a nimble melodic touch, compositional sophistication and a broader historical frame of references. This makes From Out Here both satisfying and hard to pin down."

== Track listing ==
No.	Title	Length
1.	"Triadex Logotone"	0:20
2.	"Escape Lane"	4:02
3.	"Upon Oakston"	4:54
4.	"From Out Here"	1:07
5.	"Vibrations and Waves"	4:02
6.	"Triadex Two Five Nine"	1:47
7.	"Experiment!"	3:55
8.	"All Alone in a Green and Pleasant Land"	1:00
9.	"Causeway Ballet"	5:26
10.	"Dexter Logotone"	0:09
11.	"The Blue Energy Programme"	5:43
12.	"Mr Foyster"	1:15
13.	"Discipline Before Data"	3:51
14.	"Mr Foyster Creates a Beach"	0:41
15.	"Jessica Finds the Beach"	3:07
16.	"Winter Hours"	4:29
17.	"Crag Hey"	0:40
18.	"Sine Seeing"	2:18
19.	"Verberatim"	0:58
20.	"Cobol Landing"	3:19
21.	"The Walk Home"	1:50
