= Mind How You Go (The Advisory Circle album) =

Studio album (mini-album) by The Advisory Circle
- Released: 17 October 2005
- Genre: Electronic, musique concrète, acousmatic music, ambient
- Label: Ghost Box Music GBX006
- Producer: Cate Brooks

The Advisory Circle chronology
Mind How You Go (2005)	Other Channels (2008)

Professional ratings
Review scores
Source	Rating
Uncut	3/5 stars

Mind How You Go is a mini-album by Cate Brooks, under the pseudonym of The Advisory Circle. The album was released on 17 October 2005 on the Ghost Box Music label. It was re-released in 2009 with two extra tracks and renamed Mind How You Go Now.

== Track listing ==
=== First release ===
No.	Title	Length
1.	"Logo"	0:14
2.	"Mind How You Go"	2:57
3.	"Everyday Science (For Ron Geesin)"	2:41
4.	"And The Cuckoo Comes"	2:56
5.	"Osprey"	3:52
6.	"Nuclear Substation"	2:47
7.	"Get In The Swim"	2:37
8.	"Nuclear Substation PIF"	0:43

=== Re-release ===
No.	Title	Length
1.	"Logo"	0:14
2.	"Mind How You Go"	5:51
3.	"Everyday Science (For Ron Geesin)"	2:41
4.	"And The Cuckoo Comes"	2:56
5.	"Osprey"	3:52
6.	"Nuclear Substation"	2:47
7.	"Seasons"	2:28
8.	"Get In The Swim"	2:37
9.	"Nuclear Substation PIF"	0:43
10.	"Mind How You Go"	2:57
