= North Pole Radio Station =

Studio album by Pram
- Released: 16 March 1998
- Recorded: Colossal Studio in Birmingham, England
- Genre: Neo-psychedelia
- Length: 41:57
- Labels: Domino, Merge Records
- Producer: Pram

Pram chronology
Music for Your Movies (1996)	North Pole Radio Station (1998)	Sleepy Sweet (1998)

Singles from North Pole Radio Station
- 1. "Omnichord" Released: 1996; 2. "Sleepy Sweet" Released: 1998

Professional ratings
Review scores
Source	Rating
AllMusic	4/5 stars
The Encyclopedia of Popular Music	3/5 stars
Pitchfork	6.3/10
Spin	3.5/5 stars

North Pole Radio Station is the fourth album by Pram, released in 1998.

== Critical reception ==
The Independent wrote that Pram's "dark playfulness has a woozy ambience which makes this a very friendly oddity indeed." CMJ New Music Monthly called North Pole Radio Station "the band's most skeletal album to date," writing that "for the most part, Pram's newfound economy yields brilliant results."

== Track listing ==
All lyrics are written by Rosie Cuckston; all music is composed by Pram.

No.	Title	Length
1.	"Omnichord"	5:44
2.	"Cinnabar"	4:56
3.	"El Topo"	3:42
4.	"Bathysphere"	2:42
5.	"Fallen Snow"	5:22
6.	"The Clockwork Lighthouse"	4:43
7.	"Sleepy Sweet"	7:08
8.	"Cow Ghosts"	2:41
9.	"The Doors of Empty Cupboards"	4:59

== Personnel ==
- Rosie Cuckston – vocals, keyboards, omnichord
- Matt Eaton – guitar, bass guitar, sampler, keyboards
- Sam Owen – bass guitar, guitar, keyboards, accordion, woodwind
- Max Simpson – keyboards, sampler
- Nick Sales – keyboards, guitar, woodwind, theremin, sampler
- Daren Garratt – drums, percussion
- Mark Butterworth – drums, percussion
