= Pye Corner Audio =

British electronic music project by Martin Jenkins

- Genre: Electronic music
- Years active: 2010–present
- Members: Martin Jenkins
- Website: pyecorneraudio.wordpress.com

Pye Corner Audio is a British electronic music project by Martin Jenkins. Vols 1–2 and Vols 3–4 of the project's Black Mill Tapes, originally self-released, were later released by Type Records. In 2012, its Sleep Games album was released through the Ghost Box label.

Also as Pye Corner Audio, Jenkins has supported the Scottish band Mogwai, contributing a remix to their 2014 EP Music Industry 3. Fitness Industry 1.

== Discography ==
=== Studio albums ===
- Black Mill Tapes Vol.1: Avant Shards (2010)
- Black Mill Tapes Vol.2: Do You Synthesize? (2011)
- Black Mill Tapes Vol.3: All Pathways Open (2012)
- Sleep Games (2012, Ghost Box)
- Black Mill Tapes Vol.4: Dystopian Vectors (2013)
- Prowler (2015, More Than Human)
- Stasis (2016, Ghost Box)
- Where Things Are Hollow (2017, Lapsus Records)
- Hollow Earth (2019, Ghost Box)
- Entangled Routes (2021, Ghost Box)
- Let's Emerge! (2022, Sonic Cathedral)
- The Endless Echo (2024, Ghost Box)
- Where Things Are Hollow: No Tomorrow (2025, Lapsus Records)
- More Songs About the Sun (2026)

=== Compilations and reissues ===
- Black Mill Tapes Vols.1 & 2 (2012, Type Records)
- Black Mill Tapes Vols.3 & 4 (2014, Type Records)
