= Sharron Kraus =

- Genres: Folk music, Songwriter, Experimental music
- Instruments: Vocals, guitar, banjo.
- Years active: 2002–present
- Labels: Camera Obscura Records, Bo' Weavil Recordings, Durtro
- Website: Official Website

Sharron Kraus is an English singer, songwriter and musician with strong ties to the US. Kraus was born in New York but grew up in Leicester, England. She has lived in Philadelphia and collaborated with American musicians, including Meg Baird, Helena Espvall, Christian Kiefer, Tara Burke (Fursaxa), and Gillian Chadwick (Ex Reverie) .

Kraus has been compared to 1970s English folk singers such as Shirley Collins and Anne Briggs and heralded as one of the strongest voices in English contemporary folk. She has recorded a collection of traditional folk songs, Leaves From Off the Tree, with Meg Baird and Helena Espvall of Philadelphia psych folk band Espers, but the majority of her work is self-authored, influenced by English and Appalachian folk song, but with its own distinctive voice. Musically Kraus' work is described as 'spine-tingling' 'spooky' and 'the sound of England and its enchanted gardens'.

Kraus has toured Europe and the US with United Bible Studies, Meg Baird, James Blackshaw, Fursaxa, Thinguma*jigSaw and The Iditarod.

== Discography ==
- 2002 – Beautiful Twisted CD (Camera Obscura)
- 2003 – Yuletide CD (Elsie and Jack); a collaboration with The Iditarod
- 2004 – Songs of Love and Loss CD (Camera Obscura)
- 2006 – The Black Dove CD (Tompkins Square); a collaboration with Christian Kiefer
- 2006 – Leaves From Off the Tree CD/LP (Bo'Weavil); a collaboration with Meg Baird and Helena Espvall
- 2007 – Right Wantonly A-Mumming CD (Bo'Weavil); with Jon Boden, John Spiers, Ian Giles, Fay Hield, Ian Woods, Michael Tanner, Claire Lloyd, Graham Metcalfe and Giles Lewin
- 2008 – The Fox's Wedding CD (Durtro)
- 2008 – Rusalnaia CD (Camera Obscura); a collaboration with Gillian Chadwick
- 2008 – Travellers Two CD (Important); Tau Emerald, a collaboration with Tara Burke
- 2010 – The Woody Nightshade CD/LP (Strange Attractors Audio House)
- 2013 - Pilgrim Chants and Pastoral Trails CD (Second Language)
- 2015 - Friends and Enemies; Lovers and Strangers LP (Clay Pipe Music)
- 2016 - If You Put Out Your Hand Booklet/CD; with Helen Tookey (Wounded Wolf Press)
- 2016 - Time Takes Away CD; Rusalnaia (Cambrian Records)
- 2018 - Joy's Reflection is Sorrow LP/CD (Sunstone Records/Nightshade Records)
- 2018 - Something Out of Nothing 7"; Sharron Kraus & The Belbury Poly (Ghost Box Records)
- 2019 - Chanctonbury Rings LP/CD; Sharron Kraus & Justin Hopper with The Belbury Poly (Ghost Box Records)
- 2022 - Swift Wings CD; Sharron Kraus & Justin Hopper (Nightshade Records)
- 2022 - K I N LP/CD (Cardinal Fuzz/Feeding Tube)
