= Ghost Box Records =

British electronic music record label

- Founded: 2004
- Founder: Julian House; Jim Jupp
- Genre: Electronic, library music, hauntology, psychedelia
- Country of origin: United Kingdom
- Official website: www.ghostbox.co.uk

Ghost Box is an independent, UK-based electronic music record label, launched in 2004 by graphic designer Julian House and producer Jim Jupp. Its roster includes artists such as Jupp's Belbury Poly, House's The Focus Group, and the Advisory Circle, as well as releases by Broadcast and John Foxx among others.

The label's distinctive aesthetic draws on outdated and esoteric British cultural sources from the postwar period, including early electronic and library music, public information films, educational resources, occult stories, and BBC science-fiction programs. Ghost Box consequently became associated with the 2000s music trend known as hauntology.

== Background ==
Ghost Box was established in London in 2004 by producer Jim Jupp and music industry graphic designer Julian House. The label was formally launched on January 10, 2005, and was originally created as an outlet for their own musical experiments, with the idea that each release's packaging would display a similar design sensibility and allude to a shared imaginary landscape; a very British parallel world of public information films and TV soundtracks, cosmic horror stories, vintage library music and antique synthesisers, folk song, educational programmes, English psychedelia, occult stories and folklore.

Jupp and House have described the label as existing in an imagined or misremembered past. Influenced by school textbooks and the rigid design grid of Penguin and Pelican paperback books, Ghost Box records and CDs were always intended to look and sound like artefacts from a parallel world, familiar, elegant, but somehow "wrong". It's a world outside of time where cultural references from a roughly 20-year period (1958-1978) are happening all at once.

Their work has been described as an attempt to evoke "a nostalgia for a future that never came to pass, with a vision of a strange, alternate Britain, constituted from the reorder refuse of the postwar period."

== Roster ==
Ghost Box's key artists are House's own The Focus Group and Jupp's Belbury Poly as well as The Advisory Circle, the recording name for the work of producer and longest serving Ghost Box collaborator Cate Brooks. Jupp and Brooks have collaborated together as The Belbury Circle. Ghost Box have also released albums by Pye Corner Audio, Mount Vernon Arts Lab, Hintermass (formed by Brooks with former Broadcast and Seeland member Tim Felton), The Soundcarriers and Roj (also formerly of Broadcast), as well as the comeback album by Plone, who are acknowledged by the label as progenitors of the Ghost Box aesthetic. Ghost Box has recently began to expand their roster to showcase artists from other countries, such as ToiToiToi from Berlin, Germany and Beautify Junkyards from Lisbon, Portugal.

There have also been releases by guest artists sometimes in collaborating with members of the regular roster over an ongoing series of Ghost Box singles. First the Study Series (nos. 1-10) and more recently the ongoing Other Voices series. Guests have included include Broadcast, John Foxx, Paul Weller, Moon Wiring Club, Cavern of Anti-Matter, Sean O'Hagan, Steve Moore and The Listening Center.

== Reception ==
Music journalists Simon Reynolds and Mark Fisher borrowed Jacques Derrida's philosophical term hauntology to describe Ghost Box's uniquely surreal visual and musical output. Boing Boing's Mark Pilkington noted Ghost Box founders "fused pop concrète, soundtrack and library music with sharp design and a swarm of esoteric pop-cultural references to create a parallel reality built upon memories of a very British past."

In reviewing Broadcast and The Focus Group Investigate Witch Cults of the Radio Age, PopMatters called Ghost Box "[o]ne of the most rousing (oc)cult phenomena of the past decade" having "created a career conjuring past futurisms and collectively buried fears to create music that quite literally feels like it's in a different league, even another dimension, than other modern musicians."

== Discography ==
=== Albums ===
Musician	Title	Release Date	Format	Catalogue Number
Belbury Poly	Farmer's Angle	10 January 2005; 28 October 2022 (re-issue)	Mini CD-EP; CD/7" EP (re-issue)	GBX001
The Focus Group	Sketches and Spells	10 January 2005; 4 February 2011 (LP re-issue); 11 November 2022 (2022 re-issue)	CD; LP (2011 re-issue); CD/LP (2022 re-issue)	GBX002
Belbury Poly	The Willows	10 January 2005; 4 February 2011 (LP re-issue)	CD; LP (2011 re-issue)	GBX003
Eric Zann	Ouroborindra	4 April 2005	CD	GBX004
The Focus Group	Hey Let Loose Your Love	4 April 2005	CD	GBX005
The Advisory Circle	Mind How You Go	17 October 2005	Mini CD-EP	GBX006
Belbury Poly	The Owl's Map	10 September 2006; 14 July 2017 (LP re-issue)	CD; LP (2017 re-issue)	GBX007
The Focus Group	We Are All Pan's People	27 March 2007	CD	GBX008
Mount Vernon Arts Lab	The Séance at Hobs Lane	31 May 2007; 12 June 2015 (LP re-issue)	CD; LP (2015 re-issue)	GBX009
The Advisory Circle	Other Channels	10 March 2008; 12 June 2015 (LP re-issue)	CD; LP (2015 re-issue)	GBX010
Belbury Poly	From an Ancient Star	30 January 2009	CD	GBX011
Roj	The Transactional Dharma of Roj	28 September 2009	CD	GBX012
The Advisory Circle	Mind How You Go (Revised Edition)	5 March 2010	CD/LP	GBX013
Belbury Poly	Farmer's Angle (Revised Edition)	10 September 2010	CD/10"	GBX014
The Advisory Circle	As the Crow Flies	8 July 2011	CD/LP	GBX015
Belbury Poly	The Belbury Tales	24 February 2012	CD/LP	GBX016
Pye Corner Audio	Sleep Games	19 October 2012	CD/LP	GBX017
The Focus Group	The Elektrik Karousel	10 May 2013	CD/LP	GBX018
John Foxx and The Belbury Circle	Empty Avenues	6 September 2013	CD/10"	GBX019
The Soundcarriers	Entropicalia	20 May 2014	CD/LP	GBX020
The Advisory Circle	From Out Here	5 December 2014	CD/LP	GBX021
Various artists	In a Moment... Ghost Box	9 October 2015	CD/LP	GBX022
Hintermass	The Apple Tree	18 March 2016	CD/LP	GBX023
The Belbury Poly	New Ways Out	9 June 2016	CD/LP	GBX024
Pye Corner Audio	Stasis	26 August 2016	CD/LP	GBX025
The Pattern Forms	Peel Away the Ivy	6 November 2016	CD/LP	GBX026
ToiToiToi	Im Hag	16 June 2017	CD/LP	GBX027
The Focus Group	Stop-Motion Happening with The Focus Groop	1 October 2017	CD/LP	GBX028
The Belbury Circle	Outward Journeys	12 November 2017	CD/LP/Cassette	GBX029
Beautify Junkyards	The Invisible World of Beautify Junkyards	9 March 2018	CD/LP	GBX030
The Advisory Circle	Ways of Seeing	10 June 2018	CD/LP	GBX031
Pye Corner Audio	Hollow Earth	15 February 2019	CD/LP	GBX032
Justin Hopper & Sharron Kraus with The Belbury Poly	Chanctonbury Rings	21 June 2019	CD/LP	GBX033
Plone	Puzzlewood	17 April 2020	CD/LP	GBX034
Belbury Poly	The Gone Away	28 August 2020	CD/LP	GBX035
Beautify Junkyards	Cosmorama	13 January 2021	CD/LP	GBX036
Various Artists	Intermission (Ghostbox Contemporary Connections)	12 August 2021	CD/LP	GBX037
ToiToiToi	Vaganten	19 August 2021	CD/LP	GBX038
Pye Corner Audio	Entangled Routes	26 November 2021	CD/LP	GBX039
Pneumatic Tubes	A Letter From TreeTops	25 February 2022	CD/LP	GBX040
Large Plants	The Carrier	22 April 2022	CD/LP	GBX041
The Advisory Circle	Full Circle	30 September 2022	CD/LP	GBX042
Belbury Poly	The Path	4 August 2023	CD/LP	GBX043
Large Plants	The Thorn	17 November 2023	CD/LP	GBX044
Pye Corner Audio	The Endless Echo	5 April 2024	CD/LP	GBX045
Beautify Junkyards	Nova	20 September 2024	CD/LP	GBX046

=== Singles & EPs ===
Musician	Title	Format	Catalogue Number
Belbury Poly and Moon Wiring Club	Study Series 01: Youth and Recreation (2010)	Single	GBX701
The Advisory Circle with Hong Kong in the 60s	Study Series 02: Cycles and Seasons (2010)	Single	GBX702
Belbury Poly and Mordant Music	Study Series 03: Welcome to Godalming (2010)	Single	GBX703
Broadcast and The Focus Group	Study Series 04: Familiar Shapes and Noises (2010)	Single	GBX704
Hintermass	Study Series 05: The Open Song Book (2011)	Single	GBX705
Jonny Trunk	Study Series 06: Animation and Interpretation (2011)	Single	GBX706
Pye Corner Audio with The Advisory Circle	Study Series 07: Autumnal Activities (2011)	Single	GBX707
Belbury Poly and The Advisory Circle	Study Series 08: Inversions (2012)	Single	GBX708
Listening Center with Pye Corner Audio	Study Series 09: Projections (2013)	Single	GBX709
Belbury Poly and Spacedog	Study Series 10: Message and Method (2013)	Single	GBX710
Brooks and O'Hagan	Other Voices 01: Calibair/ Mulcair (2014)	Single	GBX711
Listening Center	Other Voices 02: Quotidian Forgotten/ Our Material (2014)	Single	GBX712
The Pattern Forms	Other Voices 03: Fluchtwege/ The Sacrifice (2015)	Single	GBX713
Steve Moore	Other Voices 04: The Moon Occults Saturn At Dawn/ Val Sans Retour (2015)	Single	GBX714
Pye Corner Audio with Belbury Poly	Other Voices 05: Machines are Obsolete/ Pathways (2015)	Single	GBX715
Cavern of Anti-Matter	Other Voices 06: Pulsing River Velvet Phase/ Phototones (2015)	Single	GBX716
ToiToiToi	Other Voices 07: Odin's Jungle/ Golden Green (2015)	Single	GBX717
Beautify Junkyards	Other Voices 08: Constant Flux/ Pirâmide (2016)	Single	GBX718
Belbury Poly & Moon Wiring Club	Other Voices 09: The Music Room/ Moonling (2017)	Single	GBX719
Sharron Kraus with Belbury Poly	Other Voices 10: Something Out of Nothing/Something Out of Nothing (Belbury Poly Mix) (2019)	Single	GBX720
Paul Weller	In Another Room (2020)	EP	GBX721
Beautify Junkyards & Belbury Poly	Painting Box/Ritual in Transfigured Time (2021)	Single	GBX722
Large Plants	La Isla Bonita/Please Don't Be There for Me (2021)	Single	GBX723

=== Download only label sampler album ===
Title	Work	Catalogue Number
Various artists	Ritual and Education (2008)	GBXSAMP01
Various artists	Intermission (2020)	MSFGBXD008
