= Eric Zann =

- Born: Jim Jupp
- Origin: Wales
- Genres: Ambient; Drone music Electronic music
- Occupations: Musician; Songwriter
- Years active: 2005–present
- Label: Ghost Box Music
- Website: Ghost Box Music

Eric Zann is an alias of electronic musician Jim Jupp (along with Belbury Poly). Jupp's releases are on the Ghost Box Music label, of which he is a co-founder. The name references a minor H. P. Lovecraft short story, The Music of Erich Zann.

== Eric Zann's sound ==
Zann's sound is deliberately darker and more Gothic than other Ghost Box artists, containing elements of Hammer Horror soundtracks, ambient music and drones; in Jupp's words, "it's full of crows, church bells, magick spells and other gothic clichés".

== Discography ==
- 4 April 2005 Ouroborindra, CD
