= The Advisory Circle =

English electronic musician

- Also known as: Cate Brooks; King of Woolworths; Georges Vert; Clesse; D. D. Denham
- Origin: England
- Genres: Ambient; Library music Musique concrète Hauntology
- Occupations: Music Producer; Composer
- Years active: 2001 – 2004 (as King Of Woolworths); 2005 – present (as The Advisory Circle)
- Labels: Ghost Box; Clay Pipe Music; Cafe Kaput
- Website: Ghost Box Music

The Advisory Circle is an alias of English electronic musician Cate Brooks (formerly Jon Brooks). Her releases as The Advisory Circle are on the Ghost Box label.

The Advisory Circle's first release was Mind How You Go, issued as a 3" CD in 2005.

An extensive feature in The Wire magazine explored Brooks' fascination with public information films from the 1970s. They describe her sound as "Everything's fine, but there is something not quite right about it."

Cate Brooks also releases music, under her own name and a variety of alter-egos, including King of Woolworths. Her projects have similar musical influences (such as soundtrack music and library music), emotional atmospheres, and conceptual themes to The Advisory Circle material, through the Clay Pipe Music label, own label Café Kaput, and the band The Pattern Forms (in collaboration with Ed Macfarlane and Edd Gibson of Friendly Fires).

== Discography ==
As the Advisory Circle:

- 2005 Mind How You Go (CD, mini-album)
- 2008 Other Channels (CD)
- 2011 As the Crow Flies (CD)
- 2014 From Out Here (CD)
- 2018 Ways of Seeing (CD, LP, download)
- 2022 Full Circle (CD, LP, download)

As D. D. Denham:

- 2010 Electronic Music in the Classroom

As King of Woolworths:

- 2001 Ming Star (CD)
- 2003 L'Illustration Musicale (CD)
- 2004 Rediffusion (CD)
