= Broadcast discography =

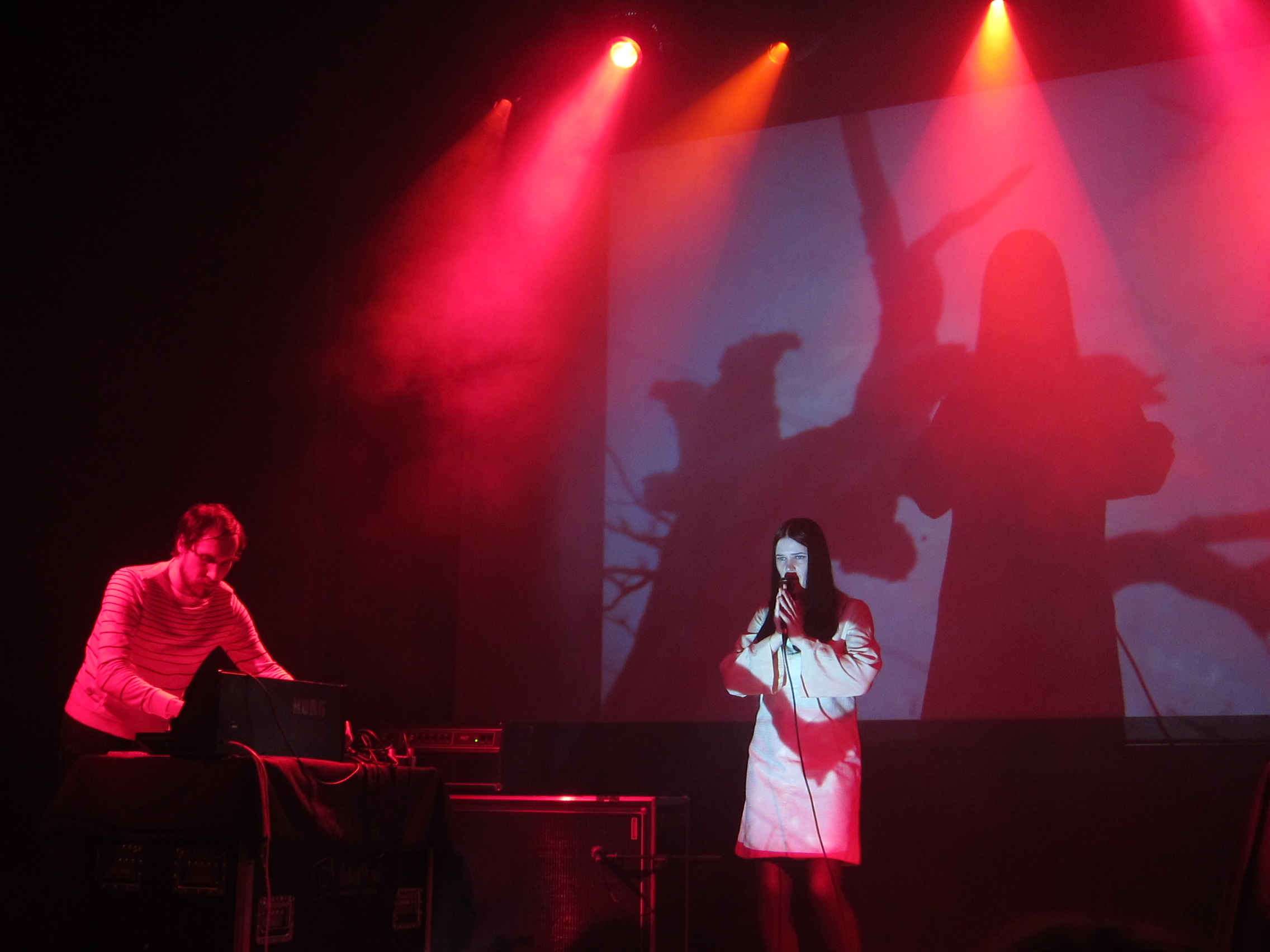
- Broadcast performing at Sónar Galicia in A Coruña, Spain in June 2010
- Studio albums: 3
- EPs: 7
- Soundtrack albums: 1
- Compilation albums: 2
- Singles: 8
- Music videos: 5
- Mini albums: 1
- Demo albums: 2

The discography of Broadcast, an English indie electronic band, consists of three studio albums, two demo albums, one collaborative mini album, one soundtrack album, two compilation albums, seven extended plays and eight singles.

Broadcast were formed in Birmingham in 1995 by vocalist Trish Keenan, bassist James Cargill, keyboardist Roj Stevens and guitarist Tim Felton. The band released their debut single, "Accidentals", on the independent record label Wurlitzer Jukebox in 1996; their two subsequent releases, The Book Lovers EP (1996) and "Living Room" (1997), were released on Duophonic Records. Soon after, the band signed to the Warp label and released Work and Non Work, a compilation of the band's previously released material. In 2000, Broadcast released their debut studio album, The Noise Made by People, and two EPs titled Extended Play and Extended Play Two. The Noise Made by People did not have a commercial impact, peaking only at No. 79 on the UK Albums Chart, but its accompanying EPs were a minor success, placing at No. 1 and No. 2, respectively, on the UK Budget Albums Chart.

Haha Sound, the band's second album, was released in 2003 to "universal acclaim", according to Metacritic. The album experienced moderate commercial success in the United States, where it peaked at No. 8 on Billboard's Electronic Albums chart and No. 50 on the Independent Albums chart. Haha Sound was preceded by the tour-only mini-album Microtronics Volume 01: Stereo Recorded Music for Links and Bridges and the Pendulum EP (2003). Tender Buttons, the final studio album to feature Keenan, was released in 2005, alongside Microtronics Volume 02.

Following the release of the B-side and rarities compilation The Future Crayon (2006), Broadcast began collaborating with Julian House and his project the Focus Group. In 2009, Broadcast and House released a collaborative album, Broadcast and the Focus Group Investigate Witch Cults of the Radio Age, which was listed as No. 1 on The Wire's Top 50 Releases of 2009 and referred to by Vice's Noisey as "perhaps Broadcast's finest achievement". A split 7-inch single with the Focus Group, featuring Broadcast's song "Inside Out", followed the album's release.

Keenan died in January 2011, following complications with pneumonia, which she suffered from after earlier contracting H1N1. Berberian Sound Studio, a soundtrack album to Peter Strickland's 2012 film of the same name, was released in January 2013 to moderate success in the UK and US, peaking at No. 24 on the UK Independent Albums Chart. Partially recorded prior to Keenan's death, it was the final Broadcast release to feature her vocals.

== Albums ==
=== Studio albums ===
List of studio albums, with chart positions
Title	Album details	Peak chart positions		
Title	Album details	UK Main	US Electro	US Indie
The Noise Made by People	Released: 20 March 2000 (UK); Label: Warp (65); Formats: CD, LP	79	—	—
Haha Sound	Released: 11 August 2003 (UK); Label: Warp (106); Formats: CD, LP	130	8	50
Tender Buttons	Released: 19 September 2005 (UK); Label: Warp (136); Formats: CD, LP	—	—	—
Broadcast and the Focus Group Investigate Witch Cults of the Radio Age (with The Focus Group)	Released: 22 September 2009 (UK); Label: Warp (189); Formats: CD, LP, digital download	—	—	—
"—" denotes a release that did not chart

=== Demo albums ===
List of demo albums, with selected details
Title	Album details
Spell Blanket – Collected Demos 2006–2009	Released: 3 May 2024; Label: Warp; Formats: CD, 2×LP, digital
Distant Call – Collected Demos 2000–2006	Released: 28 September 2024; Label: Warp; Formats: CD, LP, digital

=== Tour-only mini albums ===
List of mini albums
Title	Album details
Microtronics Volume 01: Stereo Recorded Music for Links and Bridges	Released: 1 January 2003 (UK); Label: Warp (169); Formats: Mini CD
Microtronics Volume 02: Stereo Recorded Music for Links and Bridges	Released: 30 November 2005 (UK); Label: Warp (199); Formats: Mini CD
Mother Is the Milky Way	Released: 17 October 2009 (US); Label: Warp (189T); Formats: CD

These three albums, originally only available at gigs, were reissued for general sale on CD and vinyl on 18 March 2022, with the two volumes of Microtronics being compiled into one album.

=== Soundtrack albums ===
List of soundtrack albums, with chart positions
Title	Album details	Peak chart positions		
Title	Album details	UK Indie	US Electro	US Heat
Berberian Sound Studio	Released: 7 January 2013 (UK); Label: Warp (233); Formats: CD, LP, digital download	24	32	39

=== Compilation albums ===
List of compilation albums, with chart positions
Title	Album details	Peak chart positions	
Title	Album details	UK Main	US Electro
Work and Non Work	Released: 9 June 1997 (UK); Label: Warp (52); Formats: CD, CS, LP	87	—
The Future Crayon	Released: 21 August 2006 (UK); Label: Warp (146); Formats: 2×LP, CD, digital download	—	22
"—" denotes a release that did not chart

== Extended plays ==
List of extended plays, with chart positions
Title	Album details	Peak chart positions	
Title	Album details	UK Budget	UK
The Book Lovers	Released: 25 November 1996 (UK); Label: Duophonic (45–16); Formats: 12", CD	—	150
Extended Play	Released: 21 February 2000 (UK); Label: Warp (129); Formats: 12", CD, digital download	1	—
Extended Play Two	Released: 25 September 2000 (UK); Label: Warp (141); Formats: 12", CD, digital download	2	—
Pendulum	Released: 5 May 2003 (UK); Label: Warp (162); Formats: 12", CD, digital download	46	—
"—" denotes a release that did not chart

== Singles ==
=== Retail singles ===
List of retail singles, with chart positions
Single	Year	Album	Peak chart positions
Single	Year	Album	UK
"Accidentals"	1996	Non-album single	—
"The Book Lovers"	1996	Non-album single	150
"Living Room"	1997	Non-album single	—
"Echo's Answer"	1999	The Noise Made by People	154
"Come On Let's Go"	2000	The Noise Made by People	84
"Drums on Fire"/"Come On Let's Go"	2000	Non-album single	—
"America's Boy"	2005	Tender Buttons	139
"—" denotes a release that did not chart

=== Promotional singles ===
List of promotional singles
Single	Year	Album
"Before We Begin"	2003	Haha Sound

=== Split singles ===
List of split singles, with other artists
Single	Year	Album	Other artist
"Inside Out"/"The Song Before"	2010	Non-album single	The Focus Group

== Music videos ==
List of music videos, with directors
Title	Year	Director(s)	Ref
"Papercuts"	2000	Barback	
"Come On Let's Go"	2000	Matt Hulse	
"Black Cat"	2005	Trish Keenan	
"I See, So I See So" (with the Focus Group)	2009	Julian House	
"Witch Cults" (with the Focus Group)	2009	Julian House	
