= Keith York =

English session drummer

Keith York is an English session drummer who has toured throughout the world and worked with a range of bands, including The Lightning Seeds, The Orb, Pitchshifter, Bivouac, Ladytron, Esoteric, Bentley Rhythm Ace, Broadcast and Love Amongst Ruin. He was a founding member of the 1990s Liverpool-based psychedelic rock band Dr Phibes & the House of Wax Equations along with Howard King, Jr. and Lee Belsham. He is currently playing various jazz. big band gigs and festivals, while recording, touring, and drumming for The Orb.

== Studio ==
- Dr Phibes & the House of Wax Equations: Whirlpool (album) (1991, 50 Seel Street Records)
- Dr Phibes & the House of Wax Equations: Hypnotwister (album) (1993, 50 Seel Street Records/Offside Records)
- Dr Phibes & the House of Wax Equations: Sugarblast (EP) (1991, 50 Seel Street Records)
- Dr Phibes & the House of Wax Equations: Hazy (EP) (1991, 50 Seel Street Records)
- Dr Phibes & the House of Wax Equations: Mr Phantasy (EP) (1991, 50 Seel Street Records)
- Dr Phibes & the House of Wax Equations: Misdiagnosedive (EP) (1992, 50 Seel Street Records)
- Dr Phibes & the House of Wax Equations: Moment Of Truth / Deadpan Control Freak (1993, 50 Seel Street Records)
- Dr Phibes & the House of Wax Equations: Seconds Out Round One) (compilation album) (1991, Imaginary Records)
- Dr Phibes & the House of Wax Equations: The Dark Side Of The Pool (Various Artists) – (1991 Liquid Noise Records – LIQ 1)
- Junglebone: live and studio drummer ("Mother Feature", "Grown Tired", "Yellow", "Days Go Bye") (demos)
- bivouac: Full Sized Boy (album) (1995, Geffen Records)
- bivouac: Cynic (Monkey Sanctuary) (EP) (1995, Geffen Records)
- Bentley Rhythm Ace: Bentley Rhythm Ace (album) (1997, Parlophone Records)
- Pitchshifter: "Genius (Pitchshifter song)" (maxi single) (1997, Geffen Records)
- Pitchshifter: www.pitchshifter.com (album) (1998, Geffen Records)
- Pitchshifter: "Un-United Kingdom" (EP) (1999, Geffen Records)
- Surgeon (musician): Alright(Surgeon's Keith 4 Nat Mix) 1999 (Tresor)
- Esoteric: Metamorphogenesis (1999, Eibon Records)
- Ananda Shankar: Walking On (1999, Real World Records)
- Bentley Rhythm Ace: For Your Ears Only (album) (2000, Parlophone Records)
- Broadcast: The Noise Made by People (2000, Warp Records)
- Broadcast: Come On Let's Go (7", Single) (2000, Warp Records)
- Broadcast: Extended Play (2000, Warp Records)
- Broadcast: Extended Play Two (2000, Warp Records)
- Broadcast, "Drums on Fire" (non-album single) (2000, Warp Records)
- Submarine: Skin Diving (album 2000 Kinetic/Reprise Records)
- Gramophone: Gramophone (2001 Artisan Records)
- Broadcast: Haha Sound (album) (2003, Warp Records)
- Ladytron: "Oops (Oh My)" (single) (2003, Emperor Norton Records)
- Esoteric: Subconscious Dissolution into the Continuum (album) (2004, Season of Mist)
- Ladytron: Witching Hour (album) (2005, Island Records)
- Ladytron: The Harmonium Sessions (EP) (2006, website release)
- Broadcast: The Future Crayon (2006, Warp Records)
- Love Amongst Ruin: (album track: "Come on Say It") Love Amongst Ruin (album) (2010, Ancient B Records)
- Various Artists – Real World 25: Classic Tracks & Hidden Gems - 25 Years Of Musical Discovery (2014, Real World Records)
- Love Amongst Ruin: (album track: "Oh God") (uncredited drums) Lose Your Way (album) (2015, Ancient B Records)
- bivouac "Deep Blue Sea Surround" (uncredited drums) (single) (2016), Reckless Yes
- Various Artists – Still in a Dream – A Story of Shoegaze 1988–1995 (album) (2017, Cherry Red records)
- Broadcast: Maida Vale Sessions (2022, Warp Records)

== Touring ==
- Dr Phibes & the House of Wax Equations (1990–1994)
- bivouac (1994–1996)
- The Lightning Seeds (1997–1998)
- Ananda Shankar (1999–2000)
- Broadcast (1999–2002)
- Bentley Rhythm Ace (2000–2002)
- Ladytron (2002–2007)
- The Seers (feat. Paul "Bonehead" Arthurs (Oasis)) (2003)
- The Orb (2007–2009)
- Love Amongst Ruin (2010–2011)

== Employment ==
He worked as a music lecturer at Halesowen College, Halesowen, West Midlands in 'music performance' and 'music industry' subjects, now working as the main drum instructor at York Music, Mappleborough Green, Studley, Warwickshire.
