= Alexa (name) =

- Gender: Female
- Language: Greek

Origin
- Meaning: defender of human

Other names
- See also: Alexander; Alexandra; Alexis; Alexia; Alex; Alexa

Alexa is a female form of Alex. It is variously a given name in its own right or a short form of Alexandra, both of which come from the Greek name Alexandros. It can be broken down into alexo meaning "to defend" and ander meaning "man", making Alexa mean "defender" and Alexandra "defender of man". The similarly-spelled name Aleksa is a South Slavic masculine name.

== Modern popularity ==
In the United States, the name Alexa first appeared on the chart of the top 1,000 most popular baby girl names in the year 1973. It stayed in the lower ranks of the top 1000 until 1986 when it jumped from number 815 to number 431. Popularity continued to climb and Alexa was ranked in the top 100 in the mid-1990s. According to the Social Security Administration, its highest popularity, 39th, was achieved in 2006. The name's popularity decreased rapidly after Amazon picked it as the wake word of its voice service Amazon Alexa, which was released worldwide in 2016.

== Notable people with the name ==
=== Given name ===
- Alexa Alemanni, American actress
- Alexa Brabec (born 2004), American skier
- Alexa Canady (born 1950, American neurosurgeon
- Alexa Chung (born 1983), British TV presenter
- Alexa Collins (born 1995), American influencer
- Alexa Curtis (entrepreneur), American entrepreneur and writer
- Alexa Curtis (singer) (born 2004), Australian singer, winner of The Voice Kids Australia
- Alexa Davalos (born 1982), French-American actress
- Alexa Davies (born 1995), British actress
- Alexa Dectis (born 1993), American actress
- Alexa Demie (born 1990), American actress
- Alexia Dizeko (born 2001), Angolan basketball player
- Alexa Fairchild (born 1994), Belgian equestrian athlete
- Alexa Glatch (born 1989), American tennis player
- Alexa Glover (1882–1933), Scottish golfer
- Alexa Goddard (born 1988), British singer
- Alexa Grasso (born 1993), Mexican mixed martial artist
- Alexa Hampton (born 1971), American entrepreneur
- Alexa Havins (born 1980), American actress
- Alexa Hepburn, Reader in Conversation Analysis in the Social Sciences Department at Loughborough University
- Alexa Hirschfeld (born 1985), American entrepreneur
- Alexa Hunt (born 1942), American author
- Alexa Ilacad (born 2000), Filipina actress
- Alexa Ray Joel (born 1985), singer-songwriter and daughter of Billy Joel
- Alexa Junge, American screenwriter
- Alexa Kenin (1962–1985), American actress
- Alexa Komarnycky (born 1989), Canadian swimmer
- Alexa Loo (born 1972), Canadian snowboarder
- Alexa McDonough (1944–2022), Canadian politician
- Alexa Moreno (born 1994), Mexican artistic gymnast
- Alexa Nikolas (born 1992), American actress
- Alexa von Porembsky (1906–1981), German actor
- Alexa PenaVega (born 1988), American actress and singer
- Alexa Sand, American art history professor
- Alexa Scimeca (born 1991), American pair skater
- Alexa Still, Australian musician
- Alexa Stirling (1897–1977), American golf player
- Alexa Suelzer (1918–2015), American author
- Alexa Vasko (born 1999), Canadian ice hockey player
- Alexa Viscius, American multi-disciplinary artist
- Alexa Von Tobel (born 1984), founder and CEO of LearnVest.com
- Alexa Weber Morales, American Grammy award-winning singer-songwriter, editor
- Alexa Wilkinson, American singer and musician
- Alexa Woodward, American indie/folk singer and songwriter

=== Surname ===
- Dan Alexa (born 1979), Romanian footballer

=== Stage name ===
- AleXa (born 1996), South Korean American singer
- Alexa Bliss, ring name of American professional wrestler Alexis Kaufman (born 1991)
- Kate Alexa, stage name of Australian singer–songwriter Kate Alexa Gudinski (born 1988)

== Fictional characters ==
- Alexa Lexington from MySims, MySims Kingdom, and MySims Agents
- Alexa Pappadopoulos, a character from the Degrassi teen drama franchise
- Alexa, one of the characters from the Diva Starz toy line
- Alexa Rivera, also known as Fuerza, character in The Flash
- Alexa D. Salvacion, character in Philippine drama series Dirty Linen
- Alexa Smith, character in EastEnders
- Alexa Woods, character in Alien vs. Predator
