= Tuber (disambiguation) =

A tuber is a type of modified plant structure that is enlarged to store nutrients.

Tuber may also refer to:

- Tuber (fungus), a genus of fungi that includes truffles
- Tuber (band), a stoner rock band from Greece
- Tuber (album), a 1993 album by Bivouac
- A form of tumor exhibited in tuberous sclerosis
- Tuber Hill in Canadian Cascade Arc
- Tuber (app) (Tuber浏览器), a discontinued browser app developed by Shanghai Fengxuan Information Technology
- YouTuber
