= Trish Keenan =

English musician (1968–2011)

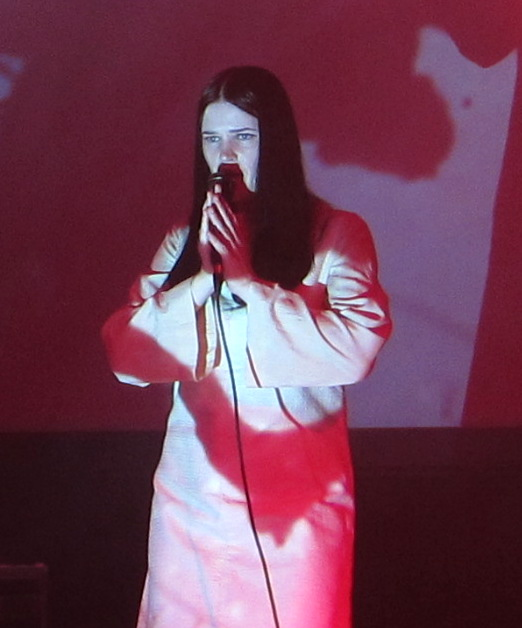
- Keenan performing in 2010

Background information
- Born: Patricia Anne Keenan; 28 September 1968; Winson Green, Birmingham, England
- Died: 14 January 2011 (aged 42) Warwick, Warwickshire, England
- Genres: Psychedelia; indietronica
- Occupations: Singer-songwriter; musician
- Instruments: Vocals; guitar; keyboards
- Years active: 1995–2011
- Label: Warp
- Formerly of: Broadcast

Patricia Anne Keenan (28 September 1968 – 14 January 2011) was an English musician and singer. She was the lead vocalist and founding member of the electronic band Broadcast, which she formed in 1995. The band released a total of five studio albums, including The Noise Made by People (2000), Haha Sound (2003) and Tender Buttons (2005), and earned a cult following.

Keenan died unexpectedly in January 2011 of pneumonia, shortly after she had contracted swine flu while completing a tour of Australia with Broadcast.

== Early life ==
Patricia Anne Keenan was born in Winson Green, a multicultural inner-city area in west Birmingham, England. She had two brothers, Malcolm and John, and two sisters, Maxine and Barbara. She was raised by her mother Zena, who was a sex worker: "I have got no problem with people knowing me or any personal details about myself," Keenan commented. "I have had a crazy life: I was brought up by a prostitute."

Keenan attended Archbishop Grimshaw Roman Catholic school, currently known as John Henry Newman Catholic school. She worked a range of catering jobs after school until at the age of 21 when she moved to Moseley, a bohemian enclave. She studied Creative Writing at Birmingham University while working on her music career.

== Career ==
Soon after moving to Moseley, Keenan formed a band called KOB in 1992 with local Solihull musicians Jude Owens and Adrian Baker. Some time in 1993, the group became a duo named Hayward Winters after Baker left. Keenan subsequently met James Cargill at a 1960s psychedelic revival club who then played bass for Hayward Winters. Soon after, the two of them formed a relationship over their shared interest and formed an improv band, Pan Am Flight Bag. The band was short-lived, only performing two gigs before they reformed in 1996 as Broadcast, which included guitarist Tim Felton, drummer Steve Perkins, and keyboardist Roj Stevens.

With Broadcast, Keenan released a total of five studio albums, including The Noise Made by People (2000), Haha Sound (2003) and Tender Buttons (2005); Keenan wrote the latter while her father was dying of cancer. In 2009 the group released a collaborative album Broadcast and The Focus Group Investigate Witch Cults of the Radio Age, with The Focus Group, the music project of graphic designer Julian House (who also designed all of Broadcast's album sleeves).

Keenan lived in and near Birmingham throughout her life, and her music career was based there. In an interview with Billboard, she said: "There's really a down tone in Birmingham. People here definitely underplay themselves. There's definitely a lack of confidence, and almost a resignation and defeatism among musicians here."

== Artistry ==
=== Musical style ===
Keenan possessed an alto vocal range. Music critics noted Keenan's vocals as "childlike" and "alluringly aloof", often "woven within squishy analog synths, pastoral melodies and mod-style rhythms." In a review published in Spin in 2001, Keenan's vocals and instrumentation alongside bandmate James Cargill were likened to being "stuck in a time warp—the sound of '70s wife-swapping parties with beanbags and unhappy children serving sausages on sticks". Keenan often explored cut-up lyric techniques, inspired partly by her interest in the occult.

=== Performances ===
Keenan suffered from stage fright in the beginning of her career, and earned a reputation for "shoegazing onstage introversion". As the band progressed, however, Keenan's stage fright receded: "I used to get nervous like the whole of that day of the show, and now it only happens the moment I walk onstage," she said in a 1998 interview. "When you listen to me sing my first line, you can always tell my heart is in my throat. Headlining gigs is a confidence booster."

== Death ==
During a tour in Australia, Keenan contracted the swine flu virus H1N1. It was reported on 14 January 2011 that she had died in the hospital. A statement by Warp Record Label said: "This is an untimely, tragic loss and we will miss Trish dearly—a unique voice, an extraordinary talent and a beautiful human being. Rest in peace."

Within hours of her death, a link was posted on Broadcast's Twitter to a mix of psychedelic, folk and world music that Keenan had made for a friend prior to leaving for the band's Australian tour. Shortly after, an intimate short film Keenan recorded on Super 8 was released, which showed festival-goers at the 2007 Moseley Folk and Arts Festival. Tributes to Keenan were made by numerous musicians, including Toro y Moi, Graham Coxon of Blur, and Colin Meloy of the Decemberists.

== Discography ==
=== Broadcast ===
- Work and Non Work (1997)
- The Noise Made by People (2000)
- Haha Sound (2003)
- Tender Buttons (2005)
- The Future Crayon (2006)
- Broadcast and The Focus Group Investigate Witch Cults of the Radio Age (2009)
- Berberian Sound Studio (2013)
- Spell Blanket - Collected Demos 2006-2009 (2024)
- Distant Call - Collected Demos 2000-2006 (2024)

=== Guest appearances ===
- Prefuse 73 – "And I'm Gone" from Surrounded by Silence (2005)
- Prefuse 73 – "The Only Trial of 9000 Suns" from The Only She Chapters (2011) (released posthumously)
