= Spell Blanket =

Demo album by Broadcast
- Released: 3 May 2024
- Recorded: 2006 – 2009
- Length: 64:39
- Label: Warp

Broadcast chronology
| Mother Is the Milky Way (2022) | Spell Blanket (2024) | Distant Call (2024) |

Singles from Spell Blanket
- 1. "Follow the Light" Released: 21 March 2024; 2. "The Games You Play" Released: 16 April 2024

Spell Blanket is the first demo album by English band Broadcast. It was released on 3 May 2024, through Warp Records. This album marks the fourth posthumous release by Broadcast after lead singer Trish Keenan's death in 2011, and the final release of unheard material from the group.

== Background ==
In September 2023, group member James Cargill, who has taken on the role of managing Broadcast's remaining material, announced on Facebook that he would be issuing a collection of previously unreleased demos in early 2024. In March 2024, Warp Records announced the release of two demo albums: Spell Blanket in May 2024, and Distant Call in September 2024. These two releases are to be the final material released by Broadcast. Spell Blanket consists of unreleased demos by Keenan recorded to 4-track tapes and MiniDiscs that were intended for the follow-up to Broadcast's 2005 album Tender Buttons.

== Singles ==
The same day of the announcement, a track off each album was released, with Spell Blanket's being a previously unheard song, "Follow the Light". Four other songs could be previously heard on Cargill's SoundCloud account: "The Song Before The Song Comes Out", "Petal Alphabet", "Where Are You?", and "Tunnel View".

In April 2024, a new single was released for the album, "The Games You Play". This demo is a vocal version of their instrumental song "DDL", which was featured on their 2006 compilation album The Future Crayon.

== Reception ==
Professional ratings
Aggregate scores
| Source | Rating |
|---|---|
| Metacritic | 90/100 |
Review scores
| Source | Rating |
| AllMusic | 4.5/5 stars |
| Mojo | 4/5 stars |
| Pitchfork | 8.5/10 |
| Record Collector | 4/5 stars |
| Uncut | 9/10 |

Upon its release, Spell Blanket was met with critical acclaim. Piers Martin of Uncut gave the release a 9/10 rating, writing of how "It fills in gaps we didn't know were there, offers tantalizing clues to their unfinished fifth album, and somehow ends up enhancing their mystique, despite laying all the cards on the table." He praised Keenan's poetic lyrics and the variety of styles and textures that she and Cargill experiment with. Heather Phares of AllMusic also commended the lyrical work, noting "There's a fullness to Keenan's lyrics that brings out the empathy of her writing as well as its mystery and beauty", and calling it a "true privilege" to discover the "raw brilliance" of the music.

== Charts ==
| Chart (2024) | Peak position |
|---|---|
| UK Album Downloads (OCC) | 27 |
| UK Independent Albums (OCC) | 12 |
| UK Scottish Albums (OCC) | 38 |
| UK Vinyl Albums (OCC) | 31 |

== Track listing ==
All tracks are written by Trish Keenan and James Cargill.

Spell Blanket track listing
| No. | Title | Length |
|---|---|---|
| 1. | "The Song Before the Song Comes Out" | 0:41 |
| 2. | "March of the Fleas" | 2:08 |
| 3. | "Greater Than Joy" | 1:29 |
| 4. | "Mother Plays Games" | 1:55 |
| 5. | "My Marble Eye" | 0:32 |
| 6. | "Roses Red" | 2:53 |
| 7. | "Hip Bone to Hip Bone" | 1:17 |
| 8. | "Running Back to Me" | 2:04 |
| 9. | "I Blink You Blink" | 0:55 |
| 10. | "Infant Girl" | 1:08 |
| 11. | "I Run in Dreams" | 1:58 |
| 12. | "Luminous Image" | 0:54 |
| 13. | "A Little Light" | 1:22 |
| 14. | "Hairpin Memories" | 2:10 |
| 15. | "My Body" | 1:08 |
| 16. | "Follow the Light" | 2:39 |
| 17. | "Tunnel View" | 2:45 |
| 18. | "Where Are You?" | 1:56 |
| 19. | "Singing Game" | 0:39 |
| 20. | "I Want to Be Fine" | 3:51 |
| 21. | "The Games You Play" | 2:34 |
| 22. | "Grey Grey Skies" | 0:24 |
| 23. | "Puzzle" | 2:18 |
| 24. | "The Clock Is on Fire" | 2:52 |
| 25. | "Petal Alphabet" | 3:38 |
| 26. | "Tell Table" | 0:42 |
| 27. | "Fatherly Veil" | 3:23 |
| 28. | "Dream Power" | 0:58 |
| 29. | "Heartbeat" | 2:36 |
| 30. | "Call Sign" | 0:30 |
| 31. | "Crone Motion" | 0:55 |
| 32. | "Sleeping Bed" | 1:09 |
| 33. | "Join in Together" | 1:27 |
| 34. | "Colour in the Numbers" | 3:42 |
| 35. | "I Am the Bridge" | 0:48 |
| 36. | "Spirit House" | 2:19 |
| Total length: | | 64:39 |
