= Sketches and Spells =

Studio album by The Focus Group
- Released: 2004
- Genre: Electronic
- Length: 34:54
- Label: Ghost Box Music GBX002
- Producer: Julian House

The Focus Group chronology
Sketches and Spells (2004)	Hey Let Loose Your Love (2005)

Sketches and Spells is an album by Julian House, under the pseudonym of The Focus Group. The album was released on CD-R in 2004 on the Ghost Box Music label.

== Track listing ==
No.	Title	Length
1.	"Stringed Winds"	1:19
2.	"Verberations"	0:16
3.	"Open The Gate"	1:14
4.	"Activity And Scales"	2:18
5.	"Corn Holes"	0:55
6.	"Verberations Exp."	1:55
7.	"Bells Hazes"	0:57
8.	"Alsh"	0:26
9.	"Hocusing Fee"	0:36
10.	"Colouring Toys"	1:12
11.	"Danse & Atoms"	3:10
12.	"Free Psych & Mirrors"	0:38
13.	"Verberation Int."	1:47
14.	"Jout Sections"	1:46
15.	"Geometree Hou"	0:46
16.	"Sun Groof"	2:05
17.	"Diagonalam"	0:31
18.	"Underwater Pries"	2:09
19.	"Jass Tarp"	1:05
20.	"Hocusing Loe"	1:29
21.	"What Are You Seeing?"	1:12
22.	"Bromiding Place"	1:11
23.	"Kasratu"	0:34
24.	"Swirling Paths"	2:26
25.	"Starry Wisdom"	2:58
