= Alexander Curtis =

Alexander Curtis may refer to:

- Alexander Curtis (British politician)
- Alexander H. Curtis, American politician
- Alexander Curtis (musician)
- Alex Curtis (born 1975), American former neo-Nazi

== See also ==
- Curtis Alexander (disambiguation)
- Alexa Curtis (disambiguation)
- Alexandra Curtis, American beauty pageant winner
