= Curtis Whitefinger =

British singer, songwriter and guitarist

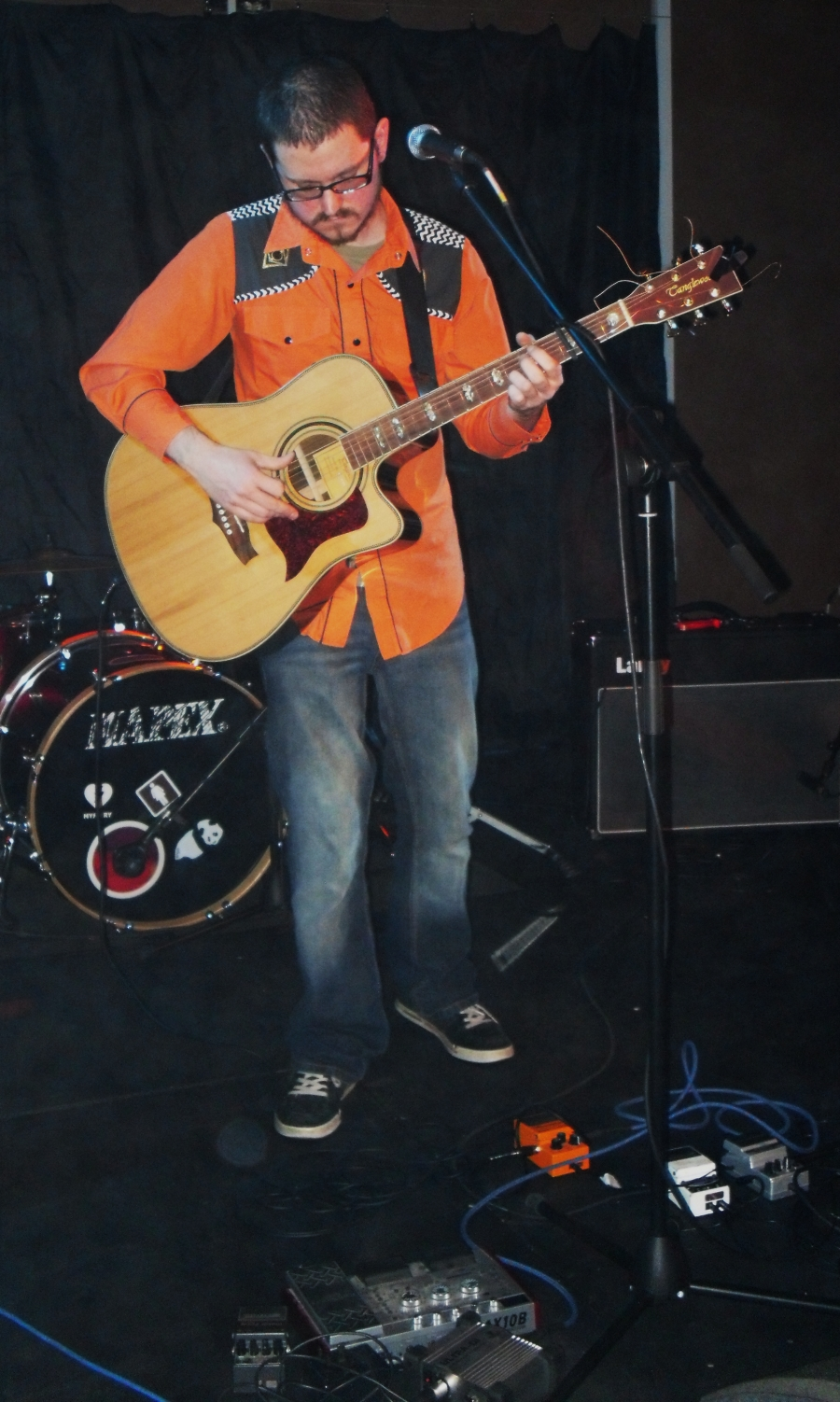
- Curtis Whitefinger performing at the Glo Bar, Nottingham, February 2009

Background information
- Born: Alexander Curtis; 1979 (age 46–47)
- Genres: Rock / Indie / Folk-rock
- Instrument: Electric guitar / Acoustic Guitar / Bass / Drums / Keyboard / Harmonica
- Label: Black Thumb Records
- Member of: The Curtis Whitefinger Ordeal, Rust For Glory
- Members: Curtis Whitefinger, John Russell, Dave Pearce, Nick Brown
- Past members: Craig Rye, Antony Hodgkinson
- Website: www.curtiswhitefinger.co.uk

Curtis Whitefinger (born Alexander Curtis, 1979) is a British singer, songwriter and guitarist from Nottingham, England, who has released six albums and two EPs of his songs through his own record label, Black Thumb Records.

Whitefinger's albums have been favourably reviewed by some magazines and websites, and in reviews Whitefinger has been compared to Bob Dylan, Paul Heaton, Raymond Chandler, and The Zutons.

Some of Whitefinger's recordings (Drunk For A Penny Dead For A Pound, Rockets Of Persistence) were engineered by Spiritualized / Julian Cope guitarist Tony 'Doggen' Foster.

Curtis often plays live with The Curtis Whitefinger Ordeal - a four-piece band currently featuring bass player John Russell, guitarist Dave Pearce and drummer Nick Brown. Past members of the band included drummer Antony Hodgkinson, formerly of Bivouac, Punish The Atom, and Dogntank, who also danced on stage for Nirvana; he now plays with Julian Cope.

The Curtis Whitefinger Ordeal also perform around the UK as a Neil Young tribute band, under the name Rust For Glory. They performed at Liverpool's Mathew Street Festival in 2011.

== Discography ==
- Extraterrestrial Blues (EP, 2005)
- Drunk For A Penny Dead For A Pound (LP, 2006)
- 27 (LP, 2007)
- Rockets Of Persistence (LP, 2008)
- Your Arse Is Mine (LP, 2008)
- The Curtis Whitefinger Ordeal (LP, 2009)
- Snuff Juice (EP, 2010)
- Inner Days (LP, 2011)
