= Extended Play Two =

EP by Broadcast
- Released: 19 September 2000
- Genres: Indie electronic; dream pop
- Length: 20:41
- Labels: Warp, Tommy Boy
- Producer: Broadcast

Broadcast chronology
Extended Play (2000)	Extended Play Two (2000)	Microtronics Volume 01 (2003)

Professional ratings
Review scores
Source	Rating
AllMusic	3/5 stars

Extended Play Two is an EP by English band Broadcast. It was released on 19 September 2000 by Warp in the UK and Tommy Boy Records in the US. The EP was recorded by the group after the release of their debut album, The Noise Made by People. The EP features non-album songs as well as a new version of "Unchanging Window", which appears re-recorded and conjoined with "Chord Simple", which originally appeared on the "Come On Let's Go" single. It also includes the track "Drums on Fire", previously issued only as a promo 12".

The sleeve was designed by Julian House.

== Legacy ==
In 2015, Fact's Mikey IQ Jones called Play Two "arguably the defining document of Broadcast's five-person lineup, and a fitting closure to their first era." He praised the musical growth showcased on their songs, writing that they "give these performances their all, and that increased power would carry over into the sessions for their next album."

In 2024, Paste named it the 12th greatest EP of all time. In a similar list, NME placed it #41 out of 50 "must-have" EPs.

== Track listing ==
No.	Title	Length
1.	"Illumination"	3:14
2.	"Unchanging Window / Chord Simple"	6:57
3.	"A Man for Atlantis"	3:12
4.	"Poem of Dead Song"	2:31
5.	"Drums on Fire"	4:33
