= Alexa Curtis =

Alexa Curtis may refer to:

- Alexa Curtis (entrepreneur) (born c. 1999), American entrepreneur, writer and former radio host
- Alexa Curtis (singer) (born 2004), Australian singer, songwriter, and actress

== See also ==
- Alexander Curtis (disambiguation)
