= Alessa =

Alessa is a feminine given name, a version of the Greek name Alexa, and a name in other languages. Notable people with the name include:

- Alessa Ries (born 1981), German swimmer
- Alessa-Catriona Pröpster (born 2001), German track cyclist
- Mohamed Mahmood Alessa (born 1989 or 1990), American criminal

== See also ==
- Alessa Gillespie, a fictional character in Silent Hill
