= House of Wax =

House of Wax may refer to:

- a wax museum
- House of Wax (1953 film), a 1953 3D horror film starring Vincent Price
- House of Wax (2005 film), a 2005 horror film starring Elisha Cuthbert and Chad Michael Murray
- House of Wax (EP), an EP by Insane Clown Posse
- "House of Wax", a song on the 2007 album Memory Almost Full by Paul McCartney

== See also ==
- Dr Phibes & the House of Wax Equations, a British rock band
- Mystery of the Wax Museum, a 1933 film, remade in 1953 as House of Wax
