= Bentley Rhythm Ace =

British electronic music duo

- In concert in 2023 (left to right: Richard March, Fuzz Townshend, James Atkin)

Background information
- Also known as: BRA
- Origin: Birmingham, England
- Genres: Big beat, electronic, electro house, electronic rock
- Years active: 1995–2000; 2016–present
- Labels: Skint, Parlophone
- Members: Mike Stokes; Richard March
- Website: facebook.com/BentleyRhythmAce

Bentley Rhythm Ace (BRA) are a British electronic music act formed in Birmingham in 1995, originally consisting of Mike Stokes and Richard March.

== Career ==
The band was formed in Birmingham by Richard March, formerly with the group Pop Will Eat Itself, and Mike Stokes, formerly of Bugweed Centipede. "Both more or less penniless, they drank in the same pub and were forced to buy their records at the cheapest place possible - car boot sales." Their live drummers include Keith York and Car SOS's Fuzz Townshend (alongside whom March previously played with in Pop Will Eat Itself), while EMF's James Atkin is also involved with BRA as a touring member.

BRA signed on the Brighton-based record label Skint and released their eponymous debut album Bentley Rhythm Ace in 1997, spawning the popular single "Bentleys Gonna Sort You Out!".

A second album, For Your Ears Only, was released in 2000 on Parlophone but was less popular. A further single, "Madam, Your Carriage Awaits", was released. The group also compiled a two-CD FSUK compilation album. In 2004 the Bentleys released a 4-song record with Sophia Lolley, Angel Face.

The name probably refers to the Rhythm Ace line of analogue drum machines manufactured by Ace Tone, some of which were rebranded and distributed by Bentley Pianos in the UK.

The group epitomises the big beat era. Signed to Skint Records, they enjoyed commercial success with their music being used on television advertisements and having an underground following.

The group split in 2000 after which they played the occasional low-key DJ set. In 2016, the duo reformed and played live sets across the UK at festivals, supporting the Wonder Stuff's December tour and headlining a few of their own shows.

== Band members ==
- Richard March (born 4 March 1965, York, England) - bass, keyboards, programming, engineering
- Mike Stokes (born 15 June 1971, Birmingham, England) - turntables, samples
- James Atkin (vocalist for EMF, born 28 March 1969, Birmingham) - vocals, guitars, keyboards
- Fuzz Townshend (born 31 July 1964, Hammersmith, London, England) - drums

== Discography ==
=== Albums ===
Year	Album	UK	Record label	Certification
1997	Bentley Rhythm Ace	13	Skint/Parlophone	UK: Gold
2000	For Your Ears Only	48	Parlophone	

=== Singles ===
Year	Single	UK
1996	"Bentleys Gonna Sort You Out!"	-
1996	"Midlander (There Can Only Be One)"	80
1997	"Bentleys Gonna Sort You Out!" / "Run on the Spot"	17
2000	"Theme from Gutbuster"	29
2000	"How'd I Do Dat???"	57
2004	"Angel Face" (with Sophia Lolley)	-

=== DJ mixes ===
- FSUK3 (1998)
