= Broadcast and the Focus Group Investigate Witch Cults of the Radio Age =

Studio album by Broadcast and the Focus Group
- Released: 26 October 2009
- Genres: Hauntology, sampledelia, neo-psychedelia, plunderphonics, musique concrète
- Length: 48:31
- Label: Warp

Broadcast chronology
| The Future Crayon (2006) | Broadcast and the Focus Group Investigate Witch Cults of the Radio Age (2009) | Berberian Sound Studio (2013) |

The Focus Group chronology
| We Are All Pan's People (2007) | Broadcast and the Focus Group Investigate Witch Cults of the Radio Age (2009) | The Elektrik Karousel (2013) |

Professional ratings
Aggregate scores
| Source | Rating |
|---|---|
| Metacritic | 79/100 |
Review scores
| Source | Rating |
| AllMusic | 4/5 stars |
| Drowned in Sound | 8/10 |
| Pitchfork | 7.2/10 |
| PopMatters | 8/10 |
| Tiny Mix Tapes | 4/5 stars |

Broadcast and the Focus Group Investigate Witch Cults of the Radio Age is a collaboration album by Broadcast and the Focus Group, released by Warp on 27 October 2009. It was the last Broadcast album released in Trish Keenan's lifetime; she died in January 2011.

== Background ==
Musician, graphic designer and Ghost Box Records co-founder Julian House (artist behind the Focus Group) had collaborated previously on artwork and packaging by British indie electronic group Broadcast. Their shared sources of inspiration—1960s BBC soundtrack music, pulp science fiction, occult texts and jazz—led to this, their first album-length musical collaboration.

== Reception ==
Rookie wrote that "the vast array of chopped and screwed samples–drawn from horror movies, nursery rhymes, and something that sounds like a long lost mantra-like ritual from some faraway place a hundred years ago–create a dynamic, haunting, but still pleasant mood, which is what makes it so thrilling". Vice assessed Witch Cults as "perhaps Broadcast's finest achievement, with intimations of Pink Floyd circa Piper at The Gates Of Dawn, as well as the horror film The Innocents and a whole, macabre toybox of colourful, arcane devices". PopMatters described their work as a unique postmodern approach which "seeks not show the world as it is, as a series of meaningless symbols, but to instead imagine a world that either never was or one that bubbles just a thin layer beyond perception".

BBC Music Review reviewed the album favorably, stating, "Witch Cults of the Radio Age is laced with enough wonder and intrigue to keep you coming back. It doesn't make perfect sense, but the sense of mystery is a key in itself". Drowned in Sound called the album "chaotic, overstimulating, like opening a dusty wardrobe and having an entire childhood tumble down on your head". Pitchfork critiqued the album as "predictable" and said that the collaboration between Broadcast and the Focus Group was like "trying to cast their spells at the same time: Some of the record is great, plenty of it is cross-chatter".

Broadcast and the Focus Group Investigate Witch Cults of the Radio Age was voted the record of the year in The Wire magazine's annual critics' poll.

== Track listing ==
| No. | Title | Length |
|---|---|---|
| 1. | "Intro / Magnetic Tales" | 0:39 |
| 2. | "The Be Colony" | 4:32 |
| 3. | "How Do You Get Along Sir?" | 1:11 |
| 4. | "Will You Read Me" | 1:20 |
| 5. | "Reception / Group Therapy" | 1:20 |
| 6. | "A Quiet Moment" | 0:58 |
| 7. | "I See, So I See So" | 2:09 |
| 8. | "You Must Wake" | 1:36 |
| 9. | "One Million Years Ago" | 2:16 |
| 10. | "A Seancing Song" | 2:19 |
| 11. | "Mr Beard, You Chatterbox" | 1:25 |
| 12. | "Drug Party" | 1:28 |
| 13. | "Libra, the Mirror's Minor Self" | 2:45 |
| 14. | "Love's Long Listen-In" | 1:48 |
| 15. | "We Are After All Here" | 2:32 |
| 16. | "A Medium's High" | 2:29 |
| 17. | "Ritual / Looking In" | 4:21 |
| 18. | "Make My Sleep His Song" | 2:41 |
| 19. | "Royal Chant" | 2:14 |
| 20. | "What I Saw" | 1:03 |
| 21. | "Let It Begin / Oh Joy" | 3:28 |
| 22. | "Round and Round and Round" | 1:39 |
| 23. | "The Be Colony / Dashing Home / What on Earth Took You?" | 2:30 |
