= Bivouac (band) =

British alternative rock band

Background information
- Origin: Derby, England, UK
- Genres: Alternative rock; fraggle; emo
- Years active: 1990–1996; 2016
- Labels: Elemental; Geffen Records
- Past members: Paul Yeadon; Granville Marsden; Antony Hodgkinson; Keith York

Bivouac were an English alternative rock band from Derby, England, who were active in the 1990s. They released two albums on the independent label Elemental, before being signed by DGC/Geffen for the 1995 album Full Size Boy.

== History ==
The band was originally a trio of Paul Yeadon (vocals, guitar), Granville Marsden (bass guitar), and Antony Hodgkinson (drums). Hodgkinson was local to the area, being from Amber Valley, whereas Yeadon and Marsden were from West Yorkshire. They were signed by Workers Playtime sub-label Elemental, releasing their debut EP in May 1992. They had support slots on tours by Fugazi and The Jesus Lizard. Their debut album Tuber was released in 1993, and they went on to sign for DGC, with Keith York (formerly of Dr Phibes & the House of Wax Equations) joining the band to replace Hodgkinson. Full Size Boy was released in July 1995, and despite good reviews, the album did not sell well, and the band were dropped from their label and disbanded soon afterwards.

Yeadon has since turned to the music production group The Moot, which has produced bands such as Send More Paramedics, as well as forming the UK band The Wireless Stores, releasing an EP and an album in 2003 and 2006. Along with second drummer Keith York, Yeadon has also played with other bands including Pitchshifter. Original drummer Antony Hodgkinson (Tony the Interpretative Dancer) danced on stage for Nirvana. Bassist Granville Marsden has since uploaded some of their unreleased demos from before they split to YouTube on his personal account.

They are now back together for shows and a new EP in 2016.

== Influences ==
Critics have categorised Bivouac's music as alternative rock, emo and fraggle.

Bivouac cited influences including Hüsker Dü, the Wedding Present, the Bodines, the Brilliant Corners, R.E.M. and Melvins.

== Discography ==
=== Albums ===
- Tuber (1993), Elemental
- Full Size Boy (1995), Geffen

=== Singles and EPs ===
- ABC EP (1992), Elemental
- "Slack" 12" (1992), Elemental
- "Good Day Song" (1993), Elemental
- "The Bell Foundry" (1993), Elemental
- Marked and Tagged EP (1994), Elemental
- "Thinking" (1995), Geffen
- "Monkey Sanctuary" (1995), Geffen
- "Deep Blue Sea Surround" (2016), Reckless Yes

=== Compilations ===
- Derby and Joan (1993), Elemental – tracks from the ABC EP and the "Slack" 12"
