= Tuber (album) =

1993 studio album by Bivouac

Studio album by Bivouac
- Released: 14 June 1993
- Studio: Rhythm Studios in Bidford-on-Avon, Warwickshire
- Genre: Alternative rock
- Length: 42:44
- Label: Elemental

Bivouac chronology
Tuber (1993)	Full Size Boy (1995)

Singles from Tuber
- 1. "Good Day Song" Released: 24 May 1993; 2. "The Bell Foundry" Released: 1993

Tuber is the debut studio album by the English alternative rock band Bivouac, released in 1993 through Elemental Records. It was recorded at Rhythm Studios in Bidford-on-Avon, Warwickshire.

A remastered version of the album was released in 2018 through the band's label, Thanks Capitalism!. Limited to 500 copies, it also included two recording sessions from 1992 and 1994.

== Track listing ==
Side One
No.	Title	Length
1.	"Good Day Song"	4:37
2.	"Big Question Mark"	4:04
3.	"Dragging Your Weight Around"	2:54
4.	"Rue"	4:26
5.	"Deadend Friend"	3:05

Side Two
No.	Title	Length
6.	"Drank"	5:38
7.	"Steel Strung"	8:12
8.	"The Need"	1:49
9.	"The Bell Foundry"	3:15
10.	"Bad Day Song"	4:41
Total length:		42:44

== Personnel ==
Bivouac

- Paul Yeadon – vocals, guitar
- Granville Marsden – bass
- Antony Hodgkinson – drums

Production and additional personnel

- Paul Johnson – engineering, mixing
- Graeme Naysmith – mixing
- Shawn Joseph – mastering
- Tom Winterburn – artwork
- Ian Berry – photography
- Nicholas Nixon – photography
- Eugene Richards – photography
- Graham Humphreys – layout
- Stuart Knight – management
- Mark Walmesley – management
- Childish Management – management
