= Hey Let Loose Your Love =

Studio album (mini-album) by The Focus Group
- Released: 2005
- Genre: Electronica, library music, musique concrète, sampledelia
- Length: 24:25
- Label: Ghost Box Music GBX005
- Producer: Julian House

The Focus Group chronology
Sketches and Spells (2004)	Hey Let Loose Your Love (2005)	We Are All Pan's People (2007)

Hey Let Loose Your Love is a mini-album by Julian House, under the pseudonym of The Focus Group. The album was released in 2005 on the Ghost Box Music label, and reissued on 10" vinyl in 2023.

== Track listing ==
No.	Title	Length
1.	"Icicle Wheel"	1:04
2.	"You Do Not See Me" (features an excerpt of Charles Causley's "I Am the Great Sun")	1:50
3.	"Clockbell"	0:24
4.	"Echo release"	1:30
5.	"Xylophone Signal"	0:28
6.	"Modern Harp"	1:41
7.	"Inside The Rubber Box"	1:19
8.	"Lifting Away"	1:26
9.	"Today's Rhythm People"	1:02
10.	"Hey Let Loose Your Love"	2:19
11.	"String Sine Romance"	1:50
12.	"The Moon Ladder"	0:25
13.	"Planning For Urban Green"	1:16
14.	"Swinging Phantom"	1:10
15.	"The Three"	1:06
16.	"Jam-Jar Carnival"	1:05
17.	"Baroque Face"	1:15
18.	"The Leaving"	1:28
19.	"Reflected Message"	1:47
