= Broadcast (band) =

British electronic rock music group

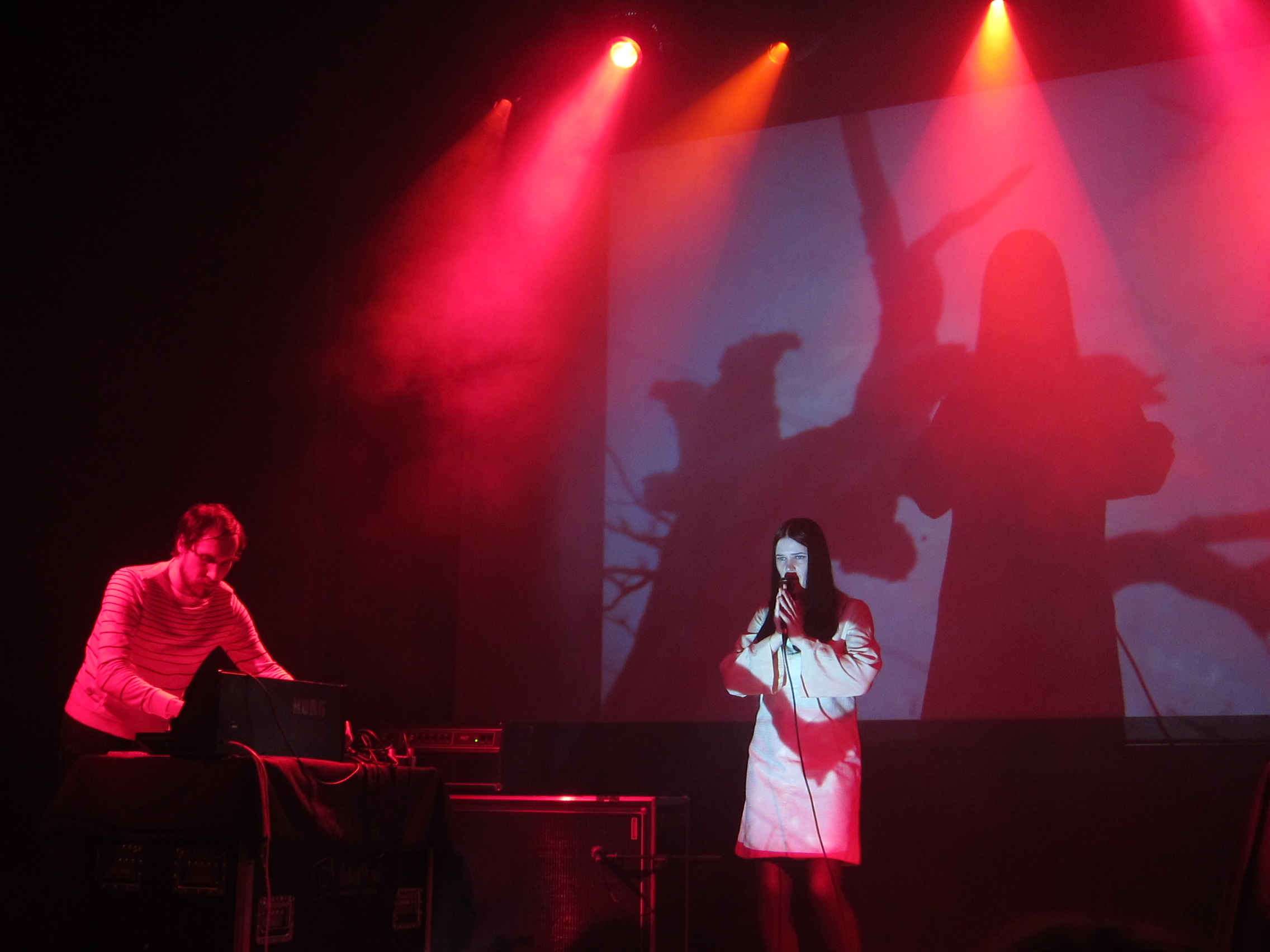
- Broadcast performing at Sónar Galicia in A Coruña, Spain in 2010

Background information
- Origin: Birmingham, England
- Genres: Psychedelic pop; ambient pop; indie electronic; space age pop; hauntology; post-rock
- Years active: 1995– 2011, 2024
- Labels: Wurlitzer Jukebox; Duophonic; Warp; Tommy Boy
- Past members: Trish Keenan; James Cargill; Steve Perkins; Tim Felton; Roj Stevens; See members section for others
- Website: broadcast.warp.net

Broadcast were an English band formed in Birmingham in 1995 by Trish Keenan (vocals, keyboards, guitar) and James Cargill (bass). Their musical style blended elements of 1960s psychedelic songwriting with early electronic music and samples from esoteric sources.

Broadcast released three studio albums—The Noise Made by People (2000), Haha Sound (2003), and Tender Buttons (2005)—on Warp Records, as well as several EPs and a collaborative album with the Focus Group titled Broadcast and the Focus Group Investigate Witch Cults of the Radio Age (2009). Their final release as a group was Distant Call, a collection of demo recordings released in 2024.

Aside from founding members Keenan and Cargill, Broadcast experienced regular lineup changes. The band has included Roj Stevens (keyboards), Tim Felton (guitar), and Steve Perkins (drums). Keith York, Phil Jenkins, Jeremy Barnes, Neil Bullock and Ash Sheehan have also featured in the band as touring or session drummers. From 2005 to 2011, Broadcast consisted only of the founding duo. Following the death of Keenan in 2011, Cargill oversaw all remaining Broadcast activity until 2024.

== History ==
=== 1995–1999: Formation ===
Keenan (formerly of folk duo Hayward Winters) and Cargill met in the mid 1990s at the Sensateria psychedelic club, and formed Pan Am Flight Bag in 1995, renamed Broadcast after several concerts.

The band's first release in 1996, was the 7" single "Accidentals" (issued on Wurlitzer Jukebox Records), which was written based around a sample from Joseph Losey’s 1967 film Accident. The same year, they released The Book Lovers EP (issued in November by Duophonic Records). In 1996, the band recorded a Peel Session.

Warp released a compilation album, Work and Non Work, in June 1997, compiling the EP and two singles. The 1999 Broadcast track "You Can Fall" was included on the soundtrack album for the film Morvern Callar, released by Warp in 2002.

=== 2000–2010: Studio albums ===
The group's debut studio album, The Noise Made by People, was released by Warp in March 2000. It was self-produced in the group's own recording studio after having been through three producers to get a particular sound. Regarding the expensive two year production of the album, Keenan said, "There [were] no financial benefits in getting it right." The band issued two EPs in the same year, Extended Play and Extended Play Two.

Their second album, Haha Sound, was released in August 2003, preceded by two EPs, Microtronics Volume 01: Stereo Recorded Music for Links and Bridges and Pendulum. Recording sessions for the album took place in fragments at various locations: Keenan recorded vocal tracks with her head in a cardboard box which gave it a "closeness and deadness that makes it sit in the mix a bit nicer," while drummer Bullock recorded drum tracks in a neighborhood church before overdubbing guitar tracks and additional arrangements. Haha Sound became their first charting album in the United States, reaching No. 8 in the Top Dance/Electronic Albums chart. While touring the United States to promote Haha Sound, the group recruited American drummer Jeremy Barnes to perform their live shows. Felton departed after Haha Sound to form a new project, Seeland, with touring keyboardist Billy Bainbridge (formerly of fellow Birmingham Warp act, Plone).

Broadcast's next album, Tender Buttons, was released in September 2005. It was their first album as a duo of Keenan and Cargill. On tour, they were joined by Ash Sheehan on drums and James's brother Bill on guitar and keyboards. A second compilation of B-sides and rarities, The Future Crayon, was issued in August 2006.

Broadcast released a collaborative album with the Focus Group (a.k.a. graphic designer and Ghost Box label co-owner Julian House) called Broadcast and the Focus Group Investigate Witch Cults of the Radio Age in October 2009. The band was chosen by Matt Groening to perform at the All Tomorrow's Parties festival he curated in May 2010 in Minehead, Somerset, England.

=== 2011–2024: Keenan's death and demo releases ===
Keenan died on 14 January 2011 at the age of 42, following complications with pneumonia, which she suffered from after earlier contracting H1N1. Cargill, the sole remaining member, said in a 2011 interview with Under the Radar that a new Broadcast album was in the works, featuring vocals recorded by Keenan shortly before her death. He later said: "Trish left a lot of tapes, four-tracks and stuff, and I've been going through those. It's difficult, and I'm connected to it at the same time. It's wonderful, but I'm also feeling a sense of loss. The next thing I release with Trish on it will be more like a monument and a tribute to her rather than this obsessive thing I used to have about making albums."

Broadcast were credited with providing the soundtrack Berberian Sound Studio for the 2012 film of the same name; the soundtrack was released 7 January 2013.

Warp Records reissued the band's entire discography in March 2015, and announced further rare reissues from the band in 2022. In April of that year, three collections of unreleased material were released: Maida Vale Sessions, Microtronics - Volumes 1 & 2, and Mother Is The Milky Way. Maida Vale Sessions is a compilation of alternate versions of released songs, recorded at Maida Vale Studios. Microtronics is an expanded collection of instrumentals originally released during 2003's tour for Haha Sound. Mother Is The Milky Way was originally released as a limited tour-only CD to support their collaborative album Broadcast and The Focus Group Investigate Witch Cults of the Radio Age. It's considered their last true release before Keenan's death.

In 2024, Warp Records announced the release of two demo albums: Spell Blanket - Collected Demos 2006-2009, a collection of Keenan's archive of 4-track tapes and MiniDiscs intended for the band's follow-up to Tender Buttons, to be released in May, and Distant Call - Collected Demos 2000-2006, consisting of demos that mostly appeared in previous studio albums, in September. A demo version of "Tears In The Typing Pool", a track featured on Tender Buttons, and a demo titled "Follow The Light" were released in March as singles from Distant Call and Spell Blanket, respectively. Following the release of Distant Call on 28 September 2024, Broadcast officially disbanded.

== Other projects ==
Cargill formed the project Children of Alice with House and former Broadcast member Stevens; they released their eponymous debut album in February 2017. The group's name is a tribute to Keenan, who had cited Alice in Wonderland as a main inspiration.

== Artistry ==
=== Musical style ===
FACT described Broadcast's music as blending "pop songcraft and experimentally-minded electronic music into a contemporary blend of psychedelia that resonated deeply with listeners". The Guardian described their work as incorporating direct pop while "mixing together influences such as the primitive electronics of the BBC Radiophonic Workshop, Czech surrealism, Moog organ, forgotten film soundtracks and kitsch ephemera." A mixture of electronic sounds and Keenan's 1960s-inspired vocals, the band is heavily influenced by the 1960s American psychedelic group the United States of America, using many of the same electronic effects. The band were also known for using samples taken from both library music compilations and real-life field recordings. The band's musical style has been variously labeled ambient pop, post-rock, psychedelic pop, dream pop, avant-pop, and space age pop. Their preoccupation with past cultural aesthetics saw them grouped with the 2000s electronic trend known as hauntology.

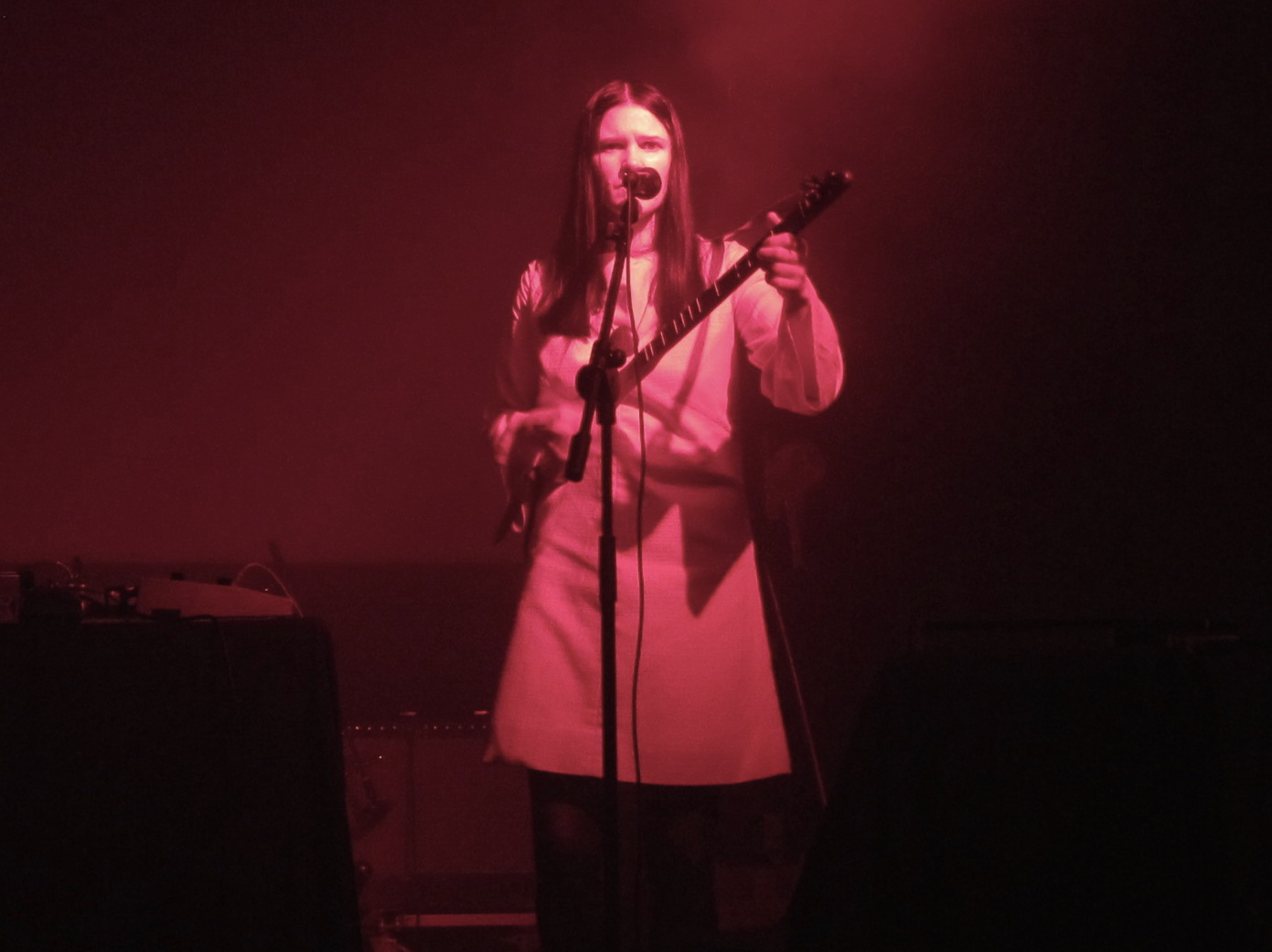
Keenan performing with Broadcast in 2010

Keenan said that the group "[listens] to a lot of soundtracks", and in a 2007 interview, she stated that the group aspired with each album to "make a soundtrack for a film that doesn't exist." In their early years, the band was frequently compared to acts such as Portishead and Stereolab. The group's musical output, according to journalist Mikey Jones, "fused the worlds of pop songcraft and experimentally-minded electronic music into a contemporary blend of psychedelia that resonated deeply with listeners, effectively expanding the conventions of what could be considered psychedelic." Keenan's first love had been primarily folk music, but this influence was downplayed in the early years of Broadcast due to Cargill's initial dislike of the genre. However, it became prominent as the band's sound became more open towards experimentation.

Other recurrent elements in the band's music (particularly their first two albums) were "science fiction" atmospheres and "skewed variants" of swing and jazz music, which "offered a Eurocentric counterpoint to the mostly American psych innovators they’d imbibed." In a review published in Spin in 2001, the band were unfavourably likened to being "stuck in a time warp–the sound of '70s wife-swapping parties with beanbags and unhappy children serving sausages on sticks."

=== Equipment ===
The band's recording gear and methods were profiled in a 2003 article in Electronic Musician, in which it was noted that they recorded many of their guitar arrangements (played at that time on a 1960s Italian Eko Edsel) through microphones, rather than through a DI unit. Additional instruments, including the vibraphone, timpani, clarinets and organ were recorded and subsequently fed through a speaker again in order to be re-recorded with microphones. Their private studio setup included an AKG BX-15, a Fostex rackmount coil reverb amplifier and an Acutronics tray (originally sourced from a Fender amplifier.) Their recording setup also included a MOTU 2408 hard-disk recording system, an Apple Mac G4, a Fender Rhodes, a Vox Continental and a Korg MS-20.

For digital production, the band sometimes used an reFX QuadraSid emulator and Native Instruments Reaktor. Commenting on the production of their second album, Haha Sound, Keenan said: "You know when it feels overworked. We used more of a minimalist approach on this album: There has been less emphasis on decoration and more on repetitive parts that go through the tracks. They are not the focus for your ear, but they are the foundation."

=== Live performances ===
Keenan suffered from stage fright in Broadcast's early days, and earned a reputation for a "shoegazing onstage introversion." "I used to get nervous like the whole of that day of the show, and now it only happens the moment I walk onstage," she later said in a 1998 interview. "When you listen to me sing my first line, you can always tell my heart is in my throat. Headlining gigs is a confidence booster."

== Members ==
- James Cargill – bass, production (1995–2013)
- Trish Keenan – vocals, guitar, keyboards (1995–2011; died 2011)
- Roj Stevens – keyboards (1995–2003)
- Tim Felton – guitar (1995–2004)
- Steve Perkins – drums (1995–1999)
- Keith York – drums (2000–2003)
- Phil Jenkins – drums (2003)
- Jeremy Barnes – drums (2003)
- Neil Bullock – drums (2003–2005)
- Billy Bainbridge – keyboards (2003)
- Bill Cargill – guitar, keyboards (2005–2006)
- Ash Sheehan – drums (2005–2006)

== Discography ==
Studio albums

- The Noise Made by People (2000)
- Haha Sound (2003)
- Tender Buttons (2005)

Compilation albums

- Work and Non Work (1997)
- The Future Crayon (2006)

Tour-only mini albums

- Microtronics Volume 01: Stereo Recorded Music for Links and Bridges (2003)
- Microtronics Volume 02: Stereo Recorded Music for Links and Bridges (2005)
- Mother Is the Milky Way (2009)

Demo albums

- Maida Vale Sessions (2022)
- Distant Call - Collected Demos 2000-2006 (2024)
- Spell Blanket - Collected Demos 2006-2009 (2024)
