= Curtis Alexander =

Curtis Alexander may refer to:

- Curtis Alexander, a footballer on the fictional footballing drama Dream Team
- Curtis Alexander (gridiron football) (born 1974), former American and Canadian football player
- Curt Alexander, screenwriter on The Bartered Bride

== See also ==
- Alexander Curtis (disambiguation)
