= The Noise Made by People =

Studio album by Broadcast
- Released: 20 March 2000
- Recorded: 1998–2000
- Genres: Psychedelic pop; ambient pop; post-rock; experimental pop; electronic; dream pop; avant-pop
- Length: 45:30
- Label: Warp
- Producer: Broadcast

Broadcast chronology
Work and Non Work (1997)	The Noise Made by People (2000)	Haha Sound (2003)

Singles from The Noise Made by People
- 1. "Echo's Answer" Released: 1 November 1999; 2. "Come On Let's Go" Released: 22 May 2000

The Noise Made by People is the debut studio album by English band Broadcast. It was released on 20 March 2000 by Warp. The band recorded and produced the album themselves after being dissatisfied with the results of earlier recording sessions helmed by external engineers.

Two singles were released from The Noise Made by People; "Echo's Answer" on 1 November 1999 and "Come On Let's Go" on 22 May 2000.

== Composition ==
Pitchfork critic Claire Lobenfeld described the style of The Noise Made by People as a homage to 1960s psychedelic pop; meanwhile, Carlene Bauer of Salon characterised it as "electronic, but not shot full of skittering beats", noting Broadcast's approach of fusing "synthesized sounds and live instrumentation". Writing for The Washington Post, Mark Jenkins said that the album "combines dub atmospherics, sample-driven audio collage and Trish Keenan's icy vocals in the manner of Portishead."

== Critical reception ==
Professional ratings
Aggregate scores
Source	Rating
Metacritic	81/100
Review scores
Source	Rating
AllMusic	5/5 stars
Alternative Press	5/5
The Guardian	4/5 stars
Melody Maker	3/5 stars
Muzik	4/5
NME	8/10
Pitchfork	7.8/10
Q	3/5 stars
Select	4/5
Spin	8/10

The Noise Made by People received critical acclaim. Awarding it a full score of five stars, AllMusic's Heather Phares called the album "shimmering, weightless pop" that "delivers [Broadcast]'s sound in widescreen, filmic grandeur." Pitchfork's Dan Gardopée applauded it as "positively vibrant and alive."

Pitchfork placed The Noise Made by People at number 177 on its list of the best albums of the 2000s, and "Echo's Answer" at number 178 on its list of the best tracks of the 1990s.

== Legacy ==
In 2014, Vice's Billy Black hailed The Noise Made by People as Warp's most representative release. Lauding its "untouchable otherness", Black wrote that it helped pave paths for accessible experimental music in the future. Stereogum's Nate Patrin wrote an essay on the album in response to its 20th anniversary, crediting it with introducing a "more sophisticated, less caricatured" psychedelia style to the new millennium. Mark Lager, in a retrospective review commemorating the album's 20th anniversary, described the "cinematic" instrumentation as similar to "the crystalline elegance of film scores (especially the swinging basslines and jazzy percussion of the ’60s)" and praised Trish Keenan's lyrics and vocals, describing them as "hypnotic and inviting while still mysterious and melancholy."

== Track listing ==
No.	Title	Writer(s)	Length
1.	"Long Was the Year"	James Cargill; Tim Felton; Trish Keenan; Steve Perkins; Roj Stevens	3:38
2.	"Unchanging Window"	Cargill; Felton; Keenan; Perkins; Stevens	3:48
3.	"Minus One"	Cargill; Stevens	2:02
4.	"Come On Let's Go"	Cargill; Felton; Keenan; Perkins; Stevens	3:17
5.	"Echo's Answer"	Cargill; Keenan; Stevens	3:12
6.	"Tower of Our Tuning"	Cargill; Felton; Keenan; Stevens	4:30
7.	"Papercuts"	Cargill; Felton; Keenan; Perkins; Stevens	4:32
8.	"You Can Fall"	Cargill; Felton; Keenan; Perkins; Stevens	4:24
9.	"Look Outside"	Cargill; Felton; Keenan; Perkins; Stevens	3:53
10.	"Until Then"	Cargill; Felton; Keenan; Stevens	3:51
11.	"City in Progress"	Cargill; Felton; Keenan; Perkins; Stevens	3:37
12.	"Dead the Long Year"	Cargill; Felton; Stevens	4:46
Total length:			45:30

== Personnel ==
Credits are adapted from the album's liner notes.

- Broadcast – engineering, mixing, recording
- Keith York – drums (tracks 2–4, 6, 7, 9)
- Stephen Francis – mixing (tracks 2, 5, 7, 8, 10, 12)
- Paul Glave – engineering (tracks 8, 10, 12)
- House – artwork, photography
- Kenny Patterson – engineering (track 11)
- Steve Perkins – drums (tracks 8, 11, 12)

== Charts ==
Chart (2000)	Peak position
UK Albums (Official Charts)	79
UK Dance Albums (OCC)	1
UK Independent Albums (Official Charts)	13

== Release history ==
Region	Date	Format	Label	Catalogue no.	Ref.
United Kingdom	20 March 2000	CD	Warp	WARPCD65	
United Kingdom	20 March 2000	LP	Warp	WARPLP65	
United States	18 April 2000	CD	Tommy Boy	TBCD1413	
United Kingdom	9 March 2015	LP	Warp	WARPLP65R	
