= Alexa Dectis =

American singer-songwriter

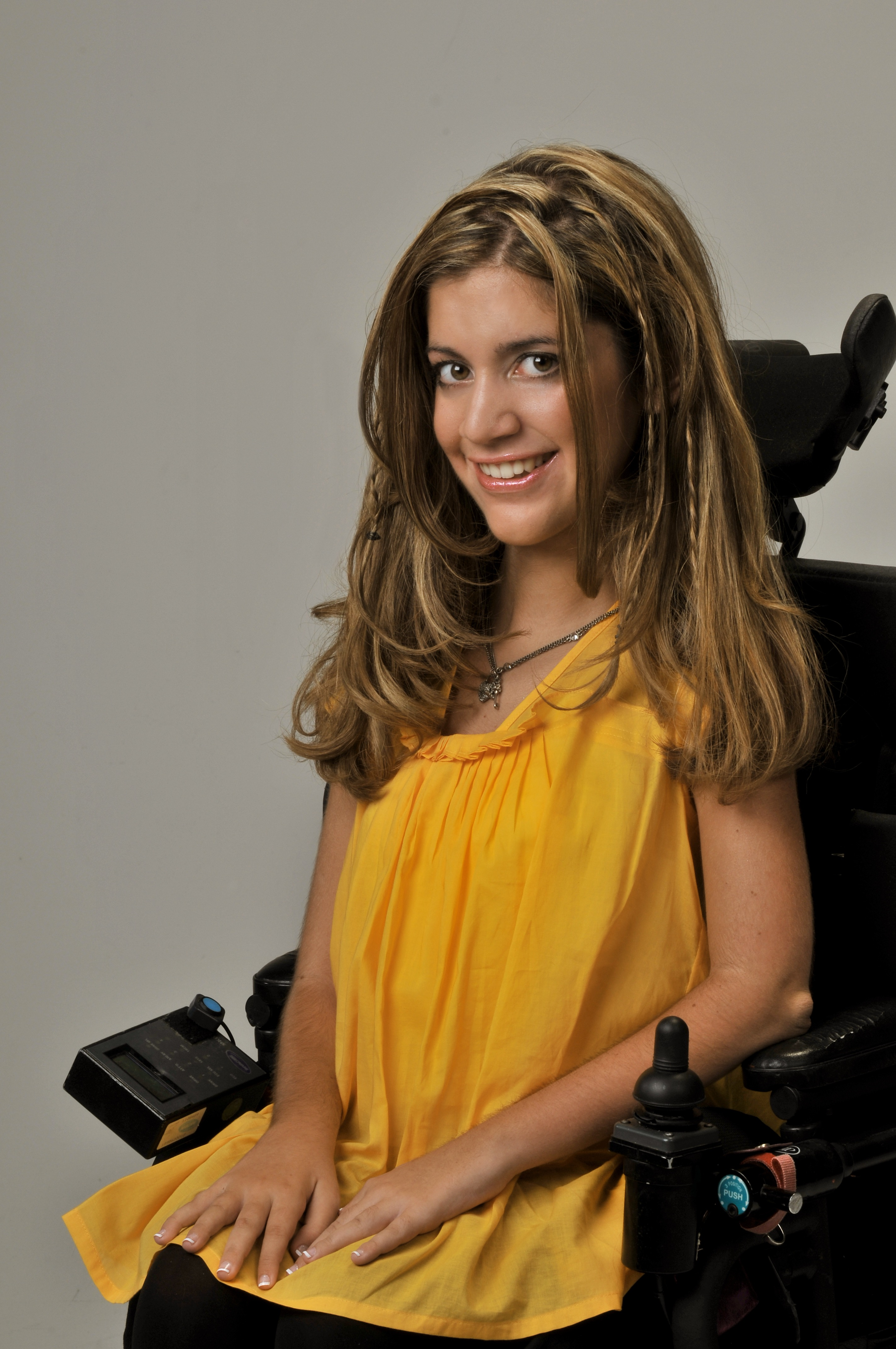
- Born: March 5, 1993 (age 33); Allentown, Pennsylvania, U.S.
- Education: George Washington University, (BA); Chapman University School of Law (JD)
- Occupation: Attorney
- Years active: 1998–present

Alexa Dectis (born March 5, 1993) is an American lawyer and former child actress. She has been a spokesperson for the Muscular Dystrophy Association since age five. Diagnosed with type 2 spinal muscular atrophy as a child, she uses a wheelchair.

== Early life and education ==
Dectis was born March 5, 1993, in Allentown, Pennsylvania. She was diagnosed with spinal muscular atrophy at 16 months and has used an electric wheelchair since age two.

Dectis graduated from the George Washington University in May 2015. While in college, she became a member of Kappa Delta sorority. Dectis went on to attend the Chapman University School of Law, where she concentrated in entertainment law and protecting minors in the entertainment industry. Dectis says her childhood in the entertainment industry made her realize the importance of protecting children in the industry.

== Career ==
After enrolling in acting classes at age five, Dectis appeared in numerous television shows, commercials, and movies, including PBS Kids, Scholastic Books, Sesame Street, The Guiding Light, and the movie Admissions, starring Tina Fey.

After graduating from law school in 2019, Dectis passed the California bar exam in July of that year. In 2022, she was named to the Forbes 30 Hollywood and Entertainment List for her work overseeing child labor law compliance across film and television projects.
