= Alexa Still =

New Zealand musician

- Born: 1962 (age 63–64); New Zealand
- Genre: Classical
- Occupations: Musician, professor
- Instrument: Flute
- Formerly of: New Zealand Symphony Orchestra

Alexa Still (born 1962) is a New Zealand-born flutist based in Oberlin, Ohio, where she is Professor of Flute at the Oberlin Conservatory of Music.

Still studied in the US with Samuel Baron at SUNY Stony Brook (MM, DMA) and with Thomas Nyfenger. Early in her career she won several competitions including the New York Flute Club Young Artist Competition, and East and West Artists Competition for a New York Debut. Still returned to New Zealand for eleven years to take the position of Principal Flute with the New Zealand Symphony Orchestra. She has presented recitals, concertos and master classes in Australia, England, Germany, Slovenia, Turkey, Mexico, Canada, Korea, China, Thailand, New Zealand, Venezuela, Brazil, and the United States. In 1996, Still received a Fulbright Award. From 2006 to 2007, she was Chair of the Board of Directors for the National Flute Association (USA). Still has also served on faculty at the University of Colorado at Boulder (1998–2006) and the Sydney Conservatorium of Music (2006–2011).

== Recordings ==
Still has recorded extensively with Koch International Classics label. Her CD recordings include:

- Carl Vine: Sonata for Flute (KIC-CD-7658)
- Medieval Suite (KIC-CD-7566)
- Alexa Still - Flute (KOCH 3-7063-2 H1)
- Alexa Still - Flute (KOCH 3-7144-2H1)
- Ernest Bloch (KOCH 3-7232-2 H1)
- Alexa Still - Flute (KOCH 3-7140-2 H1)
- William Grant Still (KOCH 3-7192-2 H1)
- Moross: Frankie and Johnny (KOCH 3-7367-2 H1)
- Kiwi Flute (KOCH 3-7345-2H1)
- Alexa Still - Flute: Charles Koechlin (KOCH 3-7394-2)
- The Viennese Guitar (KOCH 3-7404-2H1)
- Richard Rodney Bennett (KOCH 3-7505-2 H1)
- Lowell Liebermann: Complete Chamber Music for Flute (KOCH 3-7549-2 H1)
- Flute Salad (KOCH 3-7602-2)

She has also recorded with the Oberlin Music label. These recordings include:

- Ravel Intimate Masterpieces (Oberlin Music OC 13–04)
- House Music (Flute Concerto, 2006) - Matthew Hindson (Oberlin Music)
- Syzygy - Music for Flute by Efrain Amaya (Oberlin Music OC 18–01)
- Wish: Music of Valerie Coleman (Oberlin Music (Oberlin Music 5–23)

== Website ==
- Official site
- Oberlin Conservatory faculty profile
