= Alexa Woodward =

American singer-songwriter

- Born: Alabama, United States
- Genres: Indie/folk
- Occupations: Singer-songwriter, lawyer (previously)
- Instruments: Vocals, banjo, guitar
- Labels: Constant Clip
- Website: Alexawoodward.org

Alexa Woodward is an American indie/folk singer and songwriter.

== Early life ==
Alexa Woodward was born in the state of Alabama, but later on moved with her family to be raised in South Carolina and Virginia. She attended college at Gordon College in Wenham, Massachusetts and was a law student for three years in New York City. She made the transition into music after finding an old banjo her father, documentary film maker Stan Woodward, had bought but had never taken much interest in. In an interview, she spoke of the moment of inspiration saying (quote), "It really wasn't until I found the banjo that I got serious about it. I was home one Christmas and I found this banjo under the bed. I just started playing it and fell in love with it." The banjo's make was a Gibson from the early 1960s, and Woodward describes it as her main instrument she writes (her music) on "exclusively".

== Music career ==
The early roots of Woodward's career began in Boston, where she performed her first shows in Cambridge and Somerville. However, personal issues conflicting her new music career led to her moving to New York and applying for law school there. After settling down in a community house in Manhattan, she started performing at small-time gigs around town. The "Sidewalk Cafe" restaurant/bar was where she frequented and participated in the open mic nights held there. She later ventured out to perform at other public venues such as Banjo Jim's, the American Folk Art Museum, Pete's Candy Store, and The Living Room.

After completing a year of law school, Woodward headed down south to perform the Kerrville Folk Festival in the Texas hill country. It was at that time she decided that she would make a full career out of her music. At the festival, Woodward met with other music artists who now comprise the record label Constant Clip Records, and she continues to collaborate them in producing new albums and singles to this day.

== Acclaim ==
Woodward's very first studio album, "Speck," was released in the spring of 2009 through Constant Clip Records.

She set out on her first tour a day after graduating from law school. It was a three-month-long journey across the United States with three friends and musical comrades. The tour covered New York, Texas and Seattle.

Since the release of "Speck", she has performed across the United States and in other countries such as Denmark, Germany, France, and Switzerland. In 2009, she signed on to YNM management, and has performed on radio shows (NPR, college radio, and Adult Album Alternative stations), for video blogs, and festivals (SXSW, Old Songs Festival, and the Oregon Country Fair).

Woodward's music has been played by over 200 college radio stations in the United States and Canada. Her songs have been featured on season six of Fox's, "So You Think You Can Dance" as well as on national television in Australia. The title track of her album, "Speck", is on the soundtrack for The Fat Boy Chronicles, a feature film by Tin Roof Films. Her song "Secrets" is in the closing credits of the Twilight (film) series documentary "Twilight in Forks". "Secrets" has also been featured on a number of commercials for the National Geographic channel.

== Discography ==
| Official albums released | Year |
|---|---|
| 1) Speck | 2008 |
| 2) An Early Dream | 2009 |
| 3) It's a Good Life, Honey, If You Don't Grow Weary | 2012 |
| 4) Might Nigh | 2014 |
| 5) Voyager | 2021 |
