= Alexa Collins =

American influencer (born 1995)

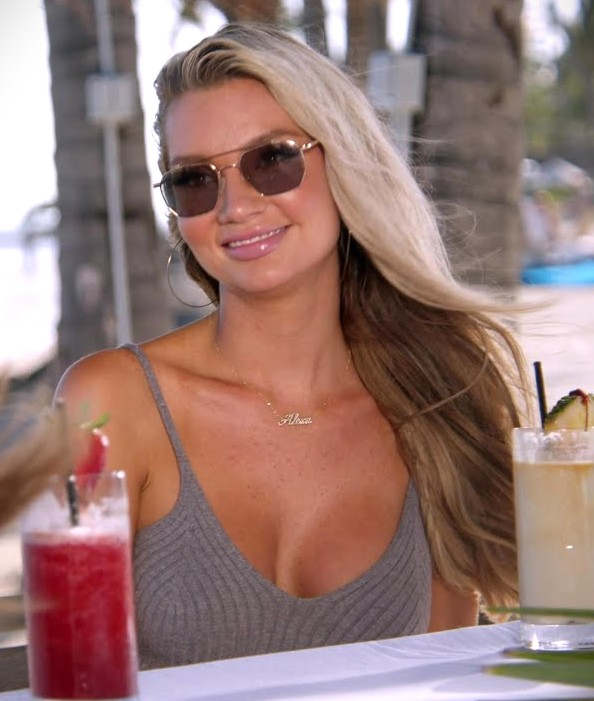
- Collins in an OnlyFans promotion in 2022.
- Born: Alexa Nicole Collins; 1995 (age 30–31); Orlando, Florida, U.S.
- Occupation: Influencer
- Years active: 2016–present
- Known for: Millionaire

Alexa Nicole Collins (born 1995) is an American model and social media influencer from Florida. She started her social media career after leaving university, and later became a millionaire.

== Early life ==
Collins was born in 1995 in Orlando, Florida and grew up in Palm Beach, Florida. After studying for communications at university for three years, she left in order to pursue a social media career. This decision made her parents "very upset".

== Career ==
Collins started her modelling career aged 15. When she left university at 21, she has already collaborated with several fashion brands: including PrettyLittleThing, Fashion Nova, as well as makeup brands Urban Decay and Tarte Cosmetics. By the time she was 25 years old, she had become a millionaire. Immediately after becoming a millionaire, she has also reached a million followers on Instagram. Her Instagram posts feature pictures of herself in lingerie, to which the South China Morning Post described as "[leaving] little to the imagination". She said that her followers had grown because she posted twice a day and "[documented] every single thing I was doing". She took part in 2021's Miami Swim Week, walking for boohoo. She is also the co-founder of BeachSweat, a virtual workout program which was established in January 2022. BeachSweat was dubbed a "visually inspired fitness".

Namita Nayyar of Women Fitness described Collins as having "glowing skin and gorgeous hair". She is also body confident and says "I feel that every woman should be confident in her own body".

== Personal life ==
In December 2022, Collins married Tommy Shields in Cancún, Mexico.
