= Bentley Rhythm Ace (album) =

Studio album by Bentley Rhythm Ace
- Released: 12 May 1997
- Genre: Electronic
- Length: 67:10
- Label: Skint, Parlophone
- Producer: Bentley Rhythm Ace

Bentley Rhythm Ace chronology
Bentley Rhythm Ace (1997)	For Your Ears Only (2000)

Singles from Bentley Rhythm Ace
- 1. "Bentleys Gonna Sort You Out!" Released: 1996; 2. "Midlander (There Can Only Be One)" Released: 1997

Professional ratings
Review scores
Source	Rating
AllMusic	4/5 stars
Christgau's Consumer Guide	(3-star Honorable Mention)
The Guardian	4/5 stars
Muzik	6/10
NME	9/10
Pitchfork	8.4/10
Select	4/5

Bentley Rhythm Ace is the debut studio album by Bentley Rhythm Ace, released in 1997. It peaked at number 13 on the UK Albums Chart. NME named it the 9th best album of 1997.

In August 2016 Richard March provided a track-by-track insight into some of the samples, sounds, instruments and musicians used on the album.

== Track listing ==
No.	Title	Length
1.	"Let There Be Flutes"	7:47
2.	"Midlander (There Can Only Be One…)"	6:38
3.	"Why Is a Frog Too..?"	5:23
4.	"Mind That Gap"	6:09
5.	"Run on the Spot"	5:25
6.	"Bentleys Gonna Sort You Out!"	4:55
7.	"Ragtopskodacarchase"	8:22
8.	"Whoosh"	5:50
9.	"Who Put the Bom in the Bom Bom Diddleye Bom"	3:59
10.	"Spacehopper"	5:23
11.	"Return of the Hardcore Jumble Carbootechnodisco Roadshow"	7:18

Japanese edition bonus tracks
No.	Title	Length
12.	"Let There Be Toast"	3:03
13.	"I Eat Skunk for Lunch"	2:55

US edition bonus tracks
No.	Title	Length
12.	"On Her Majesty's Secret Whistle"	5:35
13.	"Spy Who Loved Moose"	5:43

== Charts ==
Chart	Peak position
UK Albums (OCC)	13

== Release history ==
Region	Release date	Label	Format	Catalogue
UK	12 May 1997	Skint	CD	BRASSIC 5CD
UK	12 May 1997	Skint	2×LP	BRASSIC 5LP
UK	8 September 1997	Parlophone	CD	CDPCS 7391
UK	8 September 1997	Parlophone	2×LP	PCS 7391
UK	8 September 1997	Parlophone	TC	TCPCS 7391
