= Tuber (band) =

Greek instrumental rock band

- Origin: Crete, Greece
- Genres: Stoner rock, instrumental rock, psychedelic rock, post-rock
- Years active: 2010–present
- Labels: Neda, Krauted Mind, Rock Freaks
- Members: Nikos Gerostathos; Paris Fragkos; Yannis Gerostathos; Yannis Artzoglou

Tuber is an instrumental rock band formed in Crete, Greece, but currently located in Serres, Greece. Since its formation, the band has consisted of siblings Nikos Gerostathos (drums) and Yannis Gerostathos (guitar), and Paris Fragkos (bass guitar and production). Yannis Artzoglou (guitar) joined the trio later on.

== History ==
The Gerostathos siblings grew up in the city of Serres, in Northern Greece, but spent several years as students in Rethymno, on the island of Crete. This is where Tuber originally formed as a duet which was joined by Paris Fragkos, when they returned to Serres, upon completion of their studies. Their first recording as a trio was produced in Fragkos' own studio and production company, Parallel Universe, in 2010. Three years later, in 2013, Yannis Artzoglou joined the then-trio as the fourth member. Their band name 'Tuber' was coincidental, as they ultimately thought it sounded cool, after randomly browsing on the English dictionary. They play progressive rock music with strong psychedelic and stoner rock tendencies. Although they have considered (and attempted) adding lyrics to their music, their decision to produce strictly instrumental music has been deliberate, as they preferred that their (and their audience's) focus to be on the music rather than words. They have described their creation process as starting off with a beat and building on it, rather than jamming. Tuber have referenced, among others, Pearl Jam's "Ten", Mogwai's "Mr Beast", and the Wipers' "Over the edge", along with Michael Jackson, John Frusciante, Josh Homme and Kurt Cobain, as musicians and music works that influenced their personal music tastes as well as the band's subsequent music identity. They were one of the bands featured in the videographer Miguel Angel Cano Santizo's 2019 documentary 'Greek Rock Revolution'. In 2020, they also contributed to a 160-track bandcamp compilation, standing in solidarity to the refugees affected by the Moria refugee camp fires, on the Greek island of Lesvos.

== Albums ==
Their first successful album was Desert Overcrowded which was released in 2013. The album's title was based on a reference by Kornilios Kastoriadis describing modern urban societies. In 2017, Tuber released Out of the Blue.

== Discography ==
=== Albums ===
- Tuber (2012)
- Desert Overcrowded (2013)
- Live at Freak Valley (2016)
- Out of the Blue (2017)
- Joyful Science (2023)

=== EPs ===
- Tuber (2010) - a remastered version was re-released by Neda Records in 2015

=== Singles ===
- Smoked Up Notes (2011)
