= For Your Ears Only (album) =

Studio album by Bentley Rhythm Ace
- Released: 29 May 2000
- Genre: Electronica, big beat
- Length: 56:54
- Label: Parlophone
- Producer: Bentley Rhythm Ace

Bentley Rhythm Ace chronology
Bentley Rhythm Ace (1997)	For Your Ears Only (2000)

Singles from For Your Ears Only
- 1. "Theme from 'Gutbuster'" Released: 2000; 2. "How'd I Do Dat???" Released: 2000

Professional ratings
Aggregate scores
Source	Rating
Metacritic	66/100
Review scores
Source	Rating
AllMusic	2.5/5 stars

For Your Ears Only is the second studio album by Bentley Rhythm Ace, released through Parlophone in 2000. It peaked at number 48 on the UK Albums Chart.

== Track listing ==
No.	Title	Length
1.	"Ride Your Sleigh..."	1:29
2.	"T-Spot"	3:15
3.	"Theme from 'Gutbuster'"	5:35
4.	"Madam Your Carriage Awaits / Sugartown"	3:59
5.	"A Lot of Stick (But Not Much Carrot)"	4:43
6.	"Summer Song Blue"	4:25
7.	"Busyness Mans Lunch"	4:12
8.	"Duckweb and Fishlip"	5:14
9.	"Jim'll Twist It"	3:47
10.	"Barry Normal Eyes"	5:30
11.	"Do the Christmas Rush"	4:55
12.	"Kenny Beats (Part One)"	3:54
13.	"How'd I Do Dat???"	6:01

EU edition bonus track
No.	Title	Length
14.	"Bentley's Gonna Sort You Out (Damiens Gonna Edit a Bit Out)"	3:44

Japanese edition bonus tracks
No.	Title	Length
14.	"Say Hello"	5:28
15.	"Do Your Mints???"	6:30

== Charts ==
Chart	Peak position
UK Albums (OCC)	48
