= Tuber (app) =

Web browser mobile app

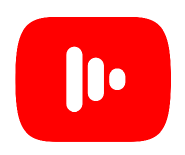
- Developer: Shanghai Fengxuan Information Technology
- Operating system: Android
- Available in: 1 languages
- List of languages Simplified Chinese
- Type: Web browser
- License: Proprietary freeware
- Website: "Tuber 浏览器". Archived from the original on 2020-10-09.

Tuber (Chinese: Tuber浏览器) was a web browser mobile app developed by Shanghai Fengxuan Information Technology that allowed users within mainland China to view filtered versions of certain websites normally blocked by the Great Firewall. Filtered versions of websites such as Google, Facebook, Instagram, YouTube, Twitter, Netflix, IMDb, and Wikipedia could be viewed. The app was backed by cybersecurity company Qihoo 360 which served as the parent company. The app required phone number registration. Sensitive keywords were blocked by the app.

On October 9, 2020, Global Times editor Rita Bai Yunyi tweeted that the move represented "a great step for China's opening up".

The app was removed from China domestic app stores and operations ceased as of October 10, 2020.

On October 12, when questioned by a Bloomberg News reporter on the topic, Foreign Ministry spokesperson Zhao Lijian replied, "This is not a diplomatic issue, and I do not have the relevant information you mentioned. China has always managed the Internet in accordance with the law. I suggest you ask the competent department for the specific situation."
