= Tender Buttons (album) =

Studio album by Broadcast
- Released: 19 September 2005
- Genres: Electronic pop; dream pop; indie electronic
- Length: 40:34
- Label: Warp
- Producers: Trish Keenan; James Cargill

Broadcast chronology
Haha Sound (2003)	Tender Buttons (2005)	The Future Crayon (2006)

Singles from Tender Buttons
- 1. "America's Boy" Released: 15 August 2005

Tender Buttons is the third and final studio album by English band Broadcast, released on 19 September 2005 by Warp. Following the departure of several bandmembers, the album was recorded largely as the core duo of Trish Keenan and James Cargill, and as such is considered to have a rawer and more stripped back sound than previous Broadcast releases. Upon its release, Tender Buttons received acclaim from critics but failed to place in international charts. "America's Boy", the lead and only single from the album, peaked at No. 139 in the UK Singles Chart.

== Music ==
Tender Buttons has been categorized as an electronic, electropop and dream pop album. The staff of GQ India noted that the album incorporates "the forgotten sounds of obscure 1960s pop, 1970s kids TV and car-boot sale synthesisers."

== Reception ==
Professional ratings
Aggregate scores
Source	Rating
Metacritic	76/100
Review scores
Source	Rating
AllMusic	4/5 stars
Entertainment Weekly	B−
The Guardian	4/5 stars
The Independent	5/5 stars
Mojo	4/5 stars
NME	8/10
Pitchfork	7.5/10
Q	2/5 stars
Uncut	3/5 stars
URB	4/5 stars

Upon its release, Tender Buttons received critical acclaim. At Metacritic, which assigns a weighted average score out of 100 to reviews and ratings from mainstream critics, the album received a score of 76, based on 21 reviews, indicating "generally favorable reviews". AllMusic writer Heather Phares said that the album "strips [the band's] luminous electronic pop down to its barest essence" and "has a uniquely fresh, modern feel. Sparingly applied beats, intricate but subtle guitars, and hazy synths dominate the album, providing a restrained backdrop for Keenan's quietly commanding voice and crossword-puzzle lyrics." The Guardian's David Peschek wrote that "Broadcast's recent records have often seemed too cluttered with effects" but that on Tender Buttons the band "managed to find a halfway house between this always engaging but fussed-at sound and … resonant, muscular psychedelia". In a positive review, Paul Woloszyn of musicOMH said that the album "takes you to another planet with a sonic soundscape lent from Stereolab, but developed to be distinctly Broadcast", and referred to the album as "arguably their finest moment".

Writing for Stylus Magazine, Jeff Siegel said that "on its surface, [Tender Buttons] seems like such a simple little curlicue, all Mother Goose coos, descending-scale melodies, and no-wave screech over dinky drum-machine patters … no mucking around in different time signatures, no showy genre fusions, just a single idea … most acts would falter here, but Broadcast pull it off with an easy grace and breezy elegance". PopMatters reviewer Adrien Begrand wrote that "instead of finding a comfortable middle ground, there's more of a sense of tension to the proceedings, the vocal hooks lulling you, only to have electronic noise jolt you awake", further referring to Tender Buttons as "rewarding [and] their boldest album to date." Pitchfork's David Raposa was more reserved in his praise, saying that the band "bring the melodies, but then dress their poptastic efforts with whatever ruckus they can conjure" and "there's no … stand-out track on this album (and there's certainly no 'oh wow' moments)" but concluding that "this is still a Broadcast album, meaning it's one of the better things you'll put in your ear this year."

In 2018, Pitchfork ranked Tender Buttons at number seven on its list of the 30 best dream pop albums. In 2023, British GQ ranked it at number eight on its list of the 10 best electronic albums of all time.

== Track listing ==
All tracks are written by Trish Keenan and James Cargill.

No.	Title	Length
1.	"I Found the F"	2:21
2.	"Black Cat"	3:58
3.	"Tender Buttons"	2:51
4.	"America's Boy"	3:34
5.	"Tears in the Typing Pool"	2:12
6.	"Corporeal"	3:54
7.	"Bit 35"	1:49
8.	"Arc of a Journey"	5:17
9.	"Michael A Grammar"	3:56
10.	"Subject to the Ladder"	3:13
11.	"Minus 3" (also known as "Evil Is Coming")	0:47
12.	"Goodbye Girls"	3:08
13.	"You and Me in Time"	1:24
14.	"I Found the End"	2:05
Total length:		40:34

- The LP track order moves "Bit 35" and "Subject to the Ladder" after "Tears in the Typing Pool" to end side 1. Side 2 begins with "Corporeal" and then continues in order for the remainder of the album.

Japanese CD bonus track
No.	Title	Length
15.	"Microtronics 14"	1:30
Total length:		42:04

== Personnel ==
All personnel credits adapted from Tender Buttons' album notes.

Broadcast

- Trish Keenan – vocals, production, engineering, recording, mixing
- James Cargill – bass, production, recording, mixing
- Roj Stevens – keyboards, effects (2)
- Tim Felton – guitar (6)

Design personnel

- Julian House – artwork
