= Berberian Sound Studio (soundtrack) =

Soundtrack album by Broadcast
- Released: 7 January 2013
- Length: 56:57
- Label: Warp

Broadcast chronology
Broadcast and the Focus Group Investigate Witch Cults of the Radio Age (2009)	Berberian Sound Studio (2013)

Berberian Sound Studio is an original soundtrack album by the British band Broadcast. The album is a soundtrack to Peter Strickland's 2012 horror film Berberian Sound Studio. Recording for the album began after Strickland approached Broadcast members James Cargill and Trish Keenan about providing the music for the soundtrack to an unseen fictional film contained within the main Berberian Sound Studio film; Cargill completed the album following the sudden death of Keenan in 2011. Berberian Sound Studio was released by Warp in January 2013, and marked Broadcast's first new material since 2009's Broadcast and the Focus Group Investigate Witch Cults of the Radio Age.

== Background and recording ==
Strickland had previously worked with Broadcast's former keyboard player, Roj Stevens, who had provided input for Strickland's debut film, Katalin Varga, in 2009. Stevens put Strickland in touch with Broadcast members Keenan and Cargill, and he asked them to provide the music to Il Vortice Equestre – the unseen fictional film that is contained within Berberian Sound Studio. The band's work then expanded to providing the entire soundtrack to Berberian Sound Studio.

Cargill drew inspiration from the Nicola Piovani's score for Le Orme and Luboš Fišer's score to Valerie and Her Week of Wonders. Cargill was also influenced by Czechoslovak New Wave filmmaking and the work of Zdeněk Liška. The album was composed and partly recorded prior to the death of Keenan in 2011, with Cargill then using sounds and dialogue from the film in the soundtrack itself. Cargill's main equipment was a laptop and dictaphone, with other sounds coming from synthesizers, Mellotron, flutes, autoharp and harpsichord. The recording process took place chiefly at Cargill's home.

== Reception ==
Professional ratings
Aggregate scores
Source	Rating
Metacritic	75/100
Review scores
Source	Rating
AllMusic	4/5 stars
BBC Music	favourable
Drowned in Sound	8/10
Fact	4.5/5 stars
The Guardian	4/5 stars
NME	8/10
Pitchfork	7.4/10.0
PopMatters	7/10
Uncut	9/10

Upon its release, Berberian Sound Studio received critical acclaim. At Metacritic, which assigns a weighted average score out of 100 to reviews and ratings from mainstream critics, the album has received a score of 75, based on 27 reviews, indicating "generally favorable reviews".

AllMusic rated Berberian Sound Studio 4 stars out of 5, with reviewer Heather Phares describing it as "clever, eerie, and beautiful", adding that it is "the perfect accompaniment to a film that examines the nature of fear and sound's part in it". Ian Wade of BBC Music remarked on the album's "perfect spooky mood" and stated that "Berberian Sound Studio and Broadcast are a perfect match". George Bass, writing for Drowned in Sound, said that the album was "as extraordinary and original as the film itself", and noted that it was "both a bona fide film score and consistent electronica album", awarding it a score of 8 out of 10. Fact magazine gave the album 4.5 stars out of 5, remarking that it was "wonderful, intense and darkly beautiful".

In his review for The Guardian, Alexis Petridis scored Berberian Sound Studio 4 stars out of 5, commenting that the "39 short pieces offer a partial index of Broadcast's various styles" but opining that "what's missing... is Keenan's remarkable voice". An NME review rated the album 8 out of 10, noting that its "creepily beautiful style" fitted well with the themes of the film". Pitchfork writer Nick Neyland rated it 7.4 out of 10, declaring that while the album was "an attempt at subtlety emulating the work of others", it had "a recognizable identity of its own". Rating the album 7 out of 10, Arnold Pan of PopMatters remarked that the soundtrack was "best experienced as a single unit all the way through" and that it was "a surprisingly complete and coherent effort". Stephen Troussé of Uncut rated the album 9 out of 10, describing it as "not an easy listen" but noting that it helped to make Broadcast "increasingly look like the key British group of the last 20 years".

== Track listing ==
All tracks are written by Broadcast.

No.	Title	Length
1.	"A Breeze Through the Burford Spur"	0:36
2.	"The Equestrian Vortex"	1:21
3.	"Beautiful Hair"	1:00
4.	"Malleus Maleficarum"	0:45
5.	"Mark of the Devil"	0:40
6.	"Confession Modulation"	0:27
7.	"Monica's Fall"	0:24
8.	"Teresa's Song (Sorrow)"	0:58
9.	"The North Downs Dimension"	1:05
10.	"Collatina Is Coming"	1:22
11.	"Such Tender Things"	0:47
12.	"Teresa, Lark of Ascension"	3:37
13.	"Monica's Burial (Under the Junipers)"	1:00
14.	"Found Scalded, Found Drowned"	0:56
15.	"Monica (Her Parents Have Been Informed)"	0:57
16.	"The Fifth Claw"	1:26
17.	"Saducismus Triumphatus"	0:33
18.	"The Gallops"	1:04
19.	"They're Here, They're Under Us"	0:23
20.	"Collatina, Mark of Damnation"	1:37
21.	"Treatise"	1:02
22.	"A Goblin"	0:32
23.	"The Equestrian Library"	0:54
24.	"The Serpent's Semen"	0:06
25.	"Burnt at the Stake"	1:33
26.	"All Chiffchaffs"	0:31
27.	"The Curfew After the Massacre"	0:30
28.	"Poultry in Mind"	0:24
29.	"The Sacred Marriage"	1:12
30.	"Valeria's Burial (Under the Fort)"	0:54
31.	"Edda's Burial (Under the Clumps)"	0:41
32.	"The Game's Up"	0:37
33.	"It Must've Been The Magpies"	0:48
34.	"The Dormitory Window"	0:58
35.	"Anima Di Cristo"	0:31
36.	"His World Is My Shed"	0:49
37.	"Collatina's Folly"	0:47
38.	"Here Comes the Sabbath, There Goes the Cross"	0:32
39.	"Our Darkest Sabbath"	3:08
Total length:		37:45
