= The Focus Group =

British electronic musician and graphic designer

- Born: Julian House
- Origin: England
- Genres: Electronica, library music, sampledelia, musique concrète, hauntology, psychedelia
- Occupations: Musician songwriter
- Years active: 2004–present
- Label: Ghost Box
- Website: Ghost Box Records

The Focus Group is a project of experimental electronic musician and graphic designer Julian House. The Focus Group's sound is a blend of influences ranging from old library music sounds produced in the 1970s, 1960s-inspired pastiches, public information films, and soundtracks to 1970s films and programmes, as well as the sound collage of musique concrète.

The Focus Group have released five studio albums on House's own label, Ghost Box: Sketches and Spells (2004), Hey Let Loose Your Love (2005), We Are All Pan's People (2007), The Elektrik Karousel (2013) and Stop-Motion Happening with the Focus Groop (2017). Hey Let Loose Your Love was featured in The Wire's top 50 albums of 2005.

Additionally, House collaborated with indie electronic band Broadcast, resulting in the 2009 album Broadcast and the Focus Group Investigate Witch Cults of the Radio Age (issued by Warp) and the 2010 7-inch EP Familiar Shapes and Noises (released on Ghost Box). Investigate Witch Cults of the Radio Age was named The Wire's top album of 2009.

== Discography ==
=== Studio albums ===
- Sketches and Spells (2004, Ghost Box)
- Hey Let Loose Your Love (2005, Ghost Box)
- We Are All Pan's People (2007, Ghost Box)
- Broadcast and the Focus Group Investigate Witch Cults of the Radio Age with Broadcast (2009, Warp)
- The Elektrik Karousel (2013, Ghost Box)
- Stop-Motion Happening with the Focus Groop (2017, Ghost Box)

=== Singles and EPs ===
- "We Are Coming Back to Dance With You" digital single (2008, Ghost Box)
- Ghost Box Free 3 Track EP split digital EP with the Advisory Circle (2008, Ghost Box)
- Familiar Shapes and Noises 7-inch EP with Broadcast (2010, Ghost Box)
