= The Future Crayon =

Compilation album by Broadcast
- Released: 21 August 2006
- Genres: Indie electronic; Dream pop
- Length: 74:37
- Label: Warp

Broadcast chronology
Tender Buttons (2005)	The Future Crayon (2006)	Broadcast and the Focus Group Investigate Witch Cults of the Radio Age (2009)

Professional ratings
Aggregate scores
Source	Rating
Metacritic	76/100
Review scores
Source	Rating
AllMusic	4/5 stars
Mojo	4/5 stars
The Observer	4/5 stars
Pitchfork	7.5/10
Tiny Mix Tapes	4/5 stars

The Future Crayon is a compilation album by English band Broadcast, released on 21 August 2006 by Warp. It collects all the tracks the band released on singles, EPs and compilations from 1999 to 2003, including rarities and B-sides, with the exception of "Drums on Fire" (from Extended Play Two). The iTunes version adds a 1997 instrumental from an NME compilation tape, as well as "Stupido" (the bonus track on the Japanese release of Haha Sound).

== Track listing ==
No.	Title	Original Release	Length
1.	"Illumination"	Extended Play Two, 2000	3:14
2.	"Still Feels Like Tears"	Pendulum EP, 2003	3:41
3.	"Small Song IV"	Pendulum EP, 2003	3:39
4.	"Where Youth and Laughter Go"	Extended Play, 2000	2:43
5.	"One Hour Empire"	Pendulum EP, 2003	1:42
6.	"Distant Call"	B-side of "Come On Let's Go", 2000	3:33
7.	"Poem of Dead Song"	Extended Play Two, 2000	2:30
8.	"Hammer Without a Master"	Wap100 Promo, 1998	4:59
9.	"Locusts"	B-side of "Come On Let's Go", 2000	5:00
10.	"Chord Simple"	B-side of "Come On Let's Go", 2000	4:38
11.	"Daves Dream"	Extended Play, 2000	4:01
12.	"DDL"	All Tomorrow's Parties 1.0, 2001	2:28
13.	"Test Area"	B-side of "Echo's Answer", 1999	5:53
14.	"Unchanging Window / Chord Simple"	Extended Play Two, 2000	6:59
15.	"A Man for Atlantis"	Extended Play Two, 2000	3:15
16.	"Minus Two"	Pendulum EP, 2003	4:16
17.	"Violent Playground"	Pendulum EP, 2003	2:11
18.	"Belly Dance"	Extended Play, 2000	4:46

iTunes version
No.	Title	Original Release	Length
19.	"Misc"	NME Presents Radio 1 Sound City Oxford '97, 1997	1:34
20.	"Stupido"	Japanese release of Haha Sound, 2003	3:35
