= Antony Hodgkinson =

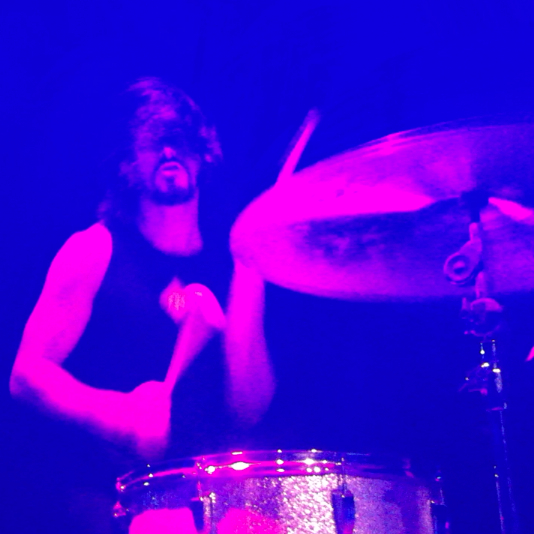

Background information
- Also known as: Tony the Interpretative Dancer, Dancing Tony
- Born: 1967 or 1968 (age 58–59); St Albans, England
- Origin: Derby, England
- Years active: 1990–present
- Formerly of: Bivouac

Antony Hodgkinson (born 1967 or 1968; also known as Tony the Interpretative Dancer or Dancing Tony) is an English rock drummer. He has performed with Bivouac and Julian Cope. He is known for his association with Nirvana, with whom he danced on stage during their British tours.

== Early life ==
Hodgkinson was born in St Albans, Hertfordshire, in 1967 or 1968. His birth mother was a Lakota Sioux, but he was adopted and raised in Derby. He took up BMX riding in the 1970s, visiting nearby Nottingham to do so. Hodgkinson took up drumming after a self-described troubled childhood.

== Nirvana ==
Hodgkinson was hospitalised with a serious illness and, shortly after recovering in 1989, was asked by a friend, music booking agent Russell Warby, to collect Nirvana from the airport on their arrival for a British tour. Hodgkinson became friends with the band who he said accepted him despite being "a bit depressed" following his illness.

Hodgkinson accompanied Nirvana on their 1990 UK tour, by which time Dave Grohl had joined them as their drummer. Hodgkinson later stated that he was particularly friendly with Grohl. Hodgkinson first danced on stage with Nirvana that year at a gig at Leeds Polytechnic when the band dared him to go onstage wearing the dress of Warby's girlfriend. Grohl later said: "He just wound up coming up on stage one night ... I'm not sure how he wound up backstage with make-up and paint all over him, but he became a dear friend. Kurt loved him, we all loved him." Hodgkinson recalled it was "quite a hairy show, really. Quite violent. It was just a stream of stage-divers – just a queue – really people trying to punch you out and whatever". He remembered trying to avoid being hit by the bass guitar of Krist Novoselic and being cautious not to strike frontman Kurt Cobain with his flailing dance moves. Hodgkinson also danced with the band during their 1991 Reading Festival appearance, starting about halfway through their set.

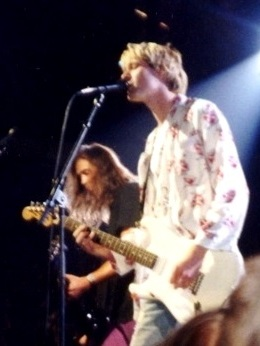
Novoselic and Cobain performing, c. 1992

Hodgkinson is remembered most for his dancing during Nirvana's headline appearance at the 1992 Reading Festival, by which time he was the drummer for indie rock band Bivouac. Hodgkinson, wearing baggy women's clothing, a tie, Chuck Taylor All-Stars shoes and clown face paint, danced in a convulsive manner with frequent pogoing to many of the songs. Hodgkinson claims that some of the moves drew inspiration from Native American dances. The set was largely unrehearsed and Hodgkinson recalled "I was absolutely shattered at the end of it" and had to wear a neck collar afterwards, because of whiplash.

Hodgkinson features prominently on the band's Live at Reading DVD, appearing in 12 of the 25 songs featured. The festival was Hodgkinson's last meeting with Cobain, who died in 1994, shortly before embarking on a planned British tour. The event caused Hodgkinson to give up drumming for six years.

== Since Nirvana ==
He has returned to drumming and is now a semi-professional musician with Dogntank, Island Apes and Great Raven. He has also drummed for Punish the Atom and Julian Cope and has worked on the soundtrack for the latter's debut novel One Three One.

Hodgkinson lives in Nottingham and also works installing recording studios and as a tester in the software industry. Late in life he was diagnosed as severely dyslexic. He no longer dances due to injuries incurred while surfing. Hodgkinson was interviewed for the 2021 BBC documentary When Nirvana Came to Britain.
