= Alexa Curtis (entrepreneur) =

American entrepreneur, writer, and radio host

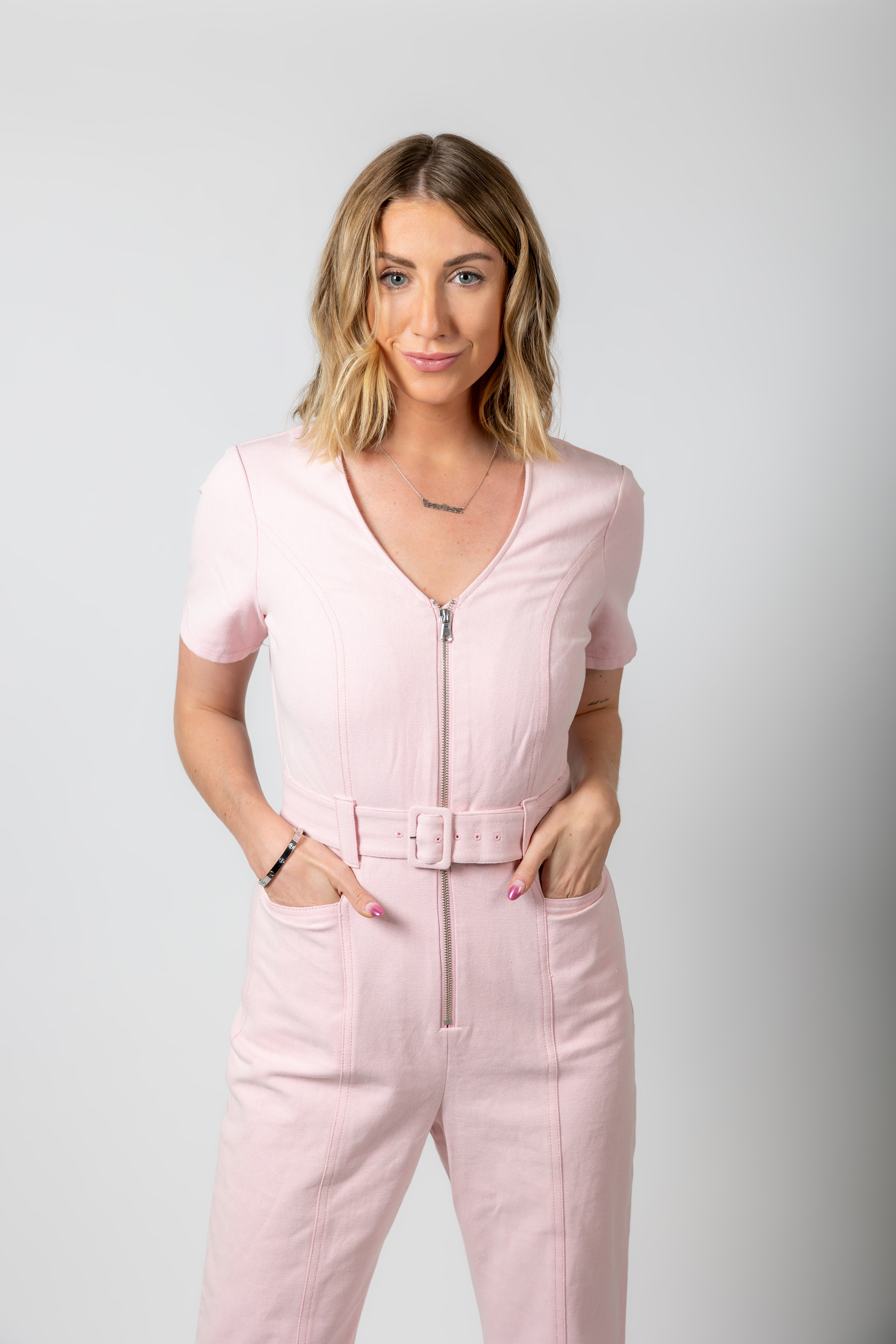
- Born: Mansfield, Connecticut, U.S.
- Occupations: Entrepreneur, writer, radio host

Alexa Curtis is an American entrepreneur, writer and former radio host. Curtis is the former host of the Radio Disney program Fearless Everyday and is the executive producer and host of the program Fearless on Localish.

== Early life ==
Curtis is from Mansfield, Connecticut. She became interested in fashion at an early age, eventually starting the blog "A Life in the Fashion Lane" when she was twelve years old in 2011. She also wrote for several fashion brands during this period and covered events such as New York, Paris, and London Fashion Weeks.

== Career ==
Curtis started out as a fashion blogger, and began writing for periodicals such as The Huffington Post and Guest of a Guest. She was modelling professionally at age 14. Around this time, she began struggling with depression, anxiety and an eating disorder. She also experienced suicidal thoughts after experiencing cyberbullying. She changed her focus from fashion to mental health because of these experiences.

In 2017, Curtis started the weekly podcast This is Life Unfiltered, where she interviews celebrities and other guest speakers on a diverse range of topics. In 2018, she launched her own radio show on Radio Disney called Fearless Every Day with Alexa Curtis.

In 2018, Curtis renamed her fashion blog "Life Unfiltered with Alexa", and began covering topics such as mental health, bullying, and social media addiction. She has written for publications such as Rolling Stone and SheKnows on these topics. These issues also led to the foundation of her non-profit organization Media Impact and Navigation for Teens, which hosts assemblies in schools in the United States that cover the aforementioned topics, along with responsibly navigating social media. In some of her writings, she was critical of the Netflix series 13 Reasons Why, because she felt that it glorified suicide, and that if she had viewed the content when she was suicidal, "she probably would have done something".

Curtis also founded the "Be Fearless" summit, which works with young people and connects them with mentors. The first summit was held at Drexel University in 2019. Curtis has since spoken at multiple summits and universities.

In 2021, Curtis was named to CT Insider’s 40 Under 40 list.

Curtis has appeared on TV shows like Today, CTV, Good Day Sacramento, Good Morning America, and The Rachael Ray Show.

== Personal life ==
In April 2024, Curtis ran the Brooklyn Half Marathon without signing up for the race in a practice colloquially referred to as "banditing." Curtis drew attention to this behavior in a social media post from April 28, 2024 on X, claiming:

"I just ran 13.1 miles for the Brooklyn half marathon at a 7.43 minute pace. I didn’t walk at all. I cried during a lot of it. I went to bed at 10 PM. I didn’t sign up for this race. I just asked the security where it started and where it ended and jumped in. No one watched me…"

Curtis responded by issuing a statement on April 29, 2024:

"I am sincerely sorry for any upset my hasty actions by unofficially joining the Brooklyn Half may have caused [sic]. It was never my intention to hurt or upset the running community, the esteemed team who works feverishly to organize and keep everyone safe, or the incredible nonprofits who benefit from runners' involvement. I made a terrible mistake. I thought I was that [sic] engaging in something uplifting would inspire others to do the same. It was a last-minute choice to join in from the sidelines and I did not think how my actions may impact the community in a negative way. As a token of my remorse, I have made a $150 donation to Tucks Travels, the nonprofit associated with the half marathon."

While Curtis received many positive comments and encouragements on social media, she also faced additional blowback as a result of this statement, with some responses accusing her of being a "serial bandit," flagging a social media post made by Curtis showing her at the finish line of the Austin 2023 Half-Marathon with a finisher's medal. She appeared in the photo without a race bib, and her name does not appear in the 2023 list of finishers. Curtis had also posted five days prior to the Brooklyn Half Marathon, on April 24, that she was training for and planned to run it, contradicting her account of her decision to join the race as having been "hasty".

== Selected writings ==
- "Does 13 Reasons Why Glamorize Teen Suicide," Rolling Stone 2017.
- "Dispatches from High School: Teens Talk 13 Reasons Why," SheKnows 2017.
- A Millennial's Guide To Cheese Plating". Guest of a Guest. 2019.
