= Dr. Phibes and the House of Wax Equations =

- Origin: Crewe, Cheshire, England
- Genres: Psychedelic rock
- Years active: 1989–1995
- Label: 50 Seel Street Records
- Past members: Lawrence Howard King Jr. Lee Patrick Belsham; Keith York

Dr. Phibes and the House of Wax Equations were an English psychedelic rock band, formed in 1989 in Crewe, Cheshire. They were composed of vocalist and guitarist Lawrence Howard King Jr., bassist Lee Patrick Belsham and drummer Keith York.

The band were regulars in the UK Indie Chart and had some links with other local bands in the North West. The band's name was linked to American actor Vincent Price, who starred in House of Wax and the two Dr. Phibes films.

The band toured extensively around the UK and mainland Europe, including a major European tour featuring performances at rock festivals in France, Switzerland and Germany.

== History ==
The band met whilst on a music course at South Cheshire College of Further Education in late 1989. King Jr. was born to Avril Fiona (née Sancho) and Lawrence Howard King Snr. in 1967 in Reading, Berkshire. His parents married in 1965 in Enfield, Middlesex.

They released their first EP Sugarblast in 1990. This was followed up by their first album Whirlpool in 1991. A second EP, called Hazy Lazy Hologram, was released the same year.

The level of success continued with appearances at the Glastonbury Festival in 1992. Dr. Phibes also recorded Peel Sessions for the Radio One DJ John Peel in 1991 and 1993. They also recorded some tracks for Mark Radcliffe's late night Radio 1 show. The band would release a further four EPs; their second album Hypnotwister came out in 1993.

Dr. Phibes' final live performance was in Manchester in 1995. Shortly afterwards the group folded.

In May 2017, it was announced via the band's Facebook fan page that bassist Lee Belsham had died of cancer at the age of 49. Born in 1968 in Chatham, Kent, Belsham was buried at St Mary's Church in Sandbach, Cheshire.

In October 2024, drummer Keith York announced the death of Howard King Jr. via the band's Facebook group. The post did not mention a cause of death nor any details of King's life post-incarceration, but stated: "I've now shed tears for both my former band mates. We lived our lives in each others pockets to create that music which thankfully still lives on."

== King Jr.'s incarceration ==
On 16 February 1997, Lawrence Howard King Jr. was charged by North Wales Police for the murder of his mother, Avril Fiona King, two days earlier at their shared home in Connah's Quay in north east Wales. King Jr., who stabbed and beat his mother, was jailed for life at Caernarfon Crown Court.

== Discography ==
- Sugarblast, EP, 1990
- Whirlpool, LP, 1991
- Hazy Lazy Hologram, 12" single (came with free 7" radio edit single), 1991
- Mr. Phantasy (7 inch remix), EP, 1991 (France-only promo EP including "L.A. Woman")
- Misdiagnosedive, EP, 1992
- Hypnotwister, LP, 1993
- Deadpan Control Freak, EP, 1993
- Moment of Truth / Deadpan Control Freak, EP, 1993
