= Work and Non Work =

Compilation album by Broadcast
- Released: 9 June 1997
- Genre: Ambient pop; indie electronic; post-rock
- Length: 36:12
- Label: Warp

Broadcast chronology
Work and Non Work (1997)	The Noise Made by People (2000)

Professional ratings
Review scores
Source	Rating
AllMusic	4/5 stars
NME	7/10
Uncut	3/5 stars

Work and Non Work is a compilation album by English band Broadcast, released 9 June 1997 by Warp. The album compiles material from their early singles and The Book Lovers EP and is their first full-length release.

== Track listing ==
All tracks are written by Trish Keenan, James Cargill and Roj Stevens.

No.	Title	Length
1.	"Accidentals"	3:28
2.	"The Book Lovers"	4:49
3.	"Message from Home"	4:59
4.	"Phantom"	3:31
5.	"We've Got Time"	4:13
6.	"Living Room"	3:26
7.	"According to No Plan"	3:08
8.	"The World Backwards"	4:00
9.	"Lights Out"	4:32
