= Haha Sound =

Studio album by Broadcast
- Released: 11 August 2003
- Genres: Experimental pop; dream pop; psychedelic pop; avant-pop; electronica
- Length: 44:27
- Label: Warp Records

Broadcast chronology
The Noise Made by People (2000)	Haha Sound (2003)	Tender Buttons (2005)

Singles from Haha Sound
- 1. "Before We Begin" Released: 2003

Haha Sound (stylised as HaHa Sound) is the second studio album by English band Broadcast. It was released on 11 August 2003 by Warp Records.

Haha Sound earned critical acclaim and became Broadcast's first charting album in the United States, where it reached the top 10 of the Billboard Dance/Electronic Albums chart.

== Background ==
The recording sessions for Haha Sound took place in various locations: for instance, Keenan recorded vocal tracks with her head in a cardboard box which gave it a "closeness and deadness that makes it sit in the mix a bit nicer," while drummer Bullock recorded drum tracks in a neighborhood church before overdubbing guitar tracks and additional arrangements.

== Critical reception ==
Professional ratings
Aggregate scores
Source	Rating
Metacritic	82/100
Review scores
Source	Rating
AllMusic	5/5 stars
Blender	4/5 stars
Entertainment Weekly	B+
The Guardian	5/5 stars
The Independent	3/5 stars
Mojo	4/5 stars
Muzik	5/5
Pitchfork	8.2/10
Q	4/5 stars
Uncut	4/5 stars

Haha Sound received highly favourable reviews from music critics. Paul Clarke called the album "a dizzying ride" in his review for Jockey Slut. Pitchfork placed Haha Sound at number 121 on its list of the best albums of the 2000s. In 2007, the record was listed by The Guardian as one of "1000 Albums to Hear Before You Die".

== Track listing ==
Songwriting credits are adapted from ASCAP.

No.	Title	Writer(s)	Length
1.	"Colour Me In"	James Cargill; Trish Keenan; Roj Stevens	2:51
2.	"Pendulum"	Cargill; Keenan	4:21
3.	"Before We Begin"	Cargill; Keenan	3:22
4.	"Valerie"	Cargill; Keenan; Stevens	4:04
5.	"Man Is Not a Bird"	Cargill; Keenan	4:52
6.	"Minim"	Cargill; Keenan	3:00
7.	"Lunch Hour Pops"	Cargill; Keenan	3:36
8.	"Black Umbrellas"	Cargill	1:08
9.	"Ominous Cloud"	Cargill; Keenan	3:46
10.	"Distorsion"	Cargill; Keenan; Stevens	2:02
11.	"Oh How I Miss You"	Cargill	1:17
12.	"The Little Bell"	Cargill; Keenan	2:48
13.	"Winter Now"	Cargill; Keenan; Tim Felton	3:48
14.	"Hawk"	Cargill; Keenan	3:32
Total length:			44:27

Japanese edition bonus track
No.	Title	Writer(s)	Length
15.	"Stupido"	Cargill; Keenan	3:38
Total length:			48:05

== Personnel ==
Credits are adapted from the album's liner notes.

- Broadcast – recording
- Neil Bullock – drums (tracks 1–12, 14)
- House – sleeve design
- P. Jenkins – drums (track 13)
- Nick Webb – mastering

== Charts ==
Chart (2003)	Peak position
UK Albums (Official Charts)	130
UK Dance Albums (OCC)	4
UK Independent Albums (Official Charts)	13
US Independent Albums (Billboard)	50
US Top Dance Albums (Billboard)	8

== Release history ==
Region	Date	Format	Edition	Label	Catalogue no.	Ref.
United Kingdom	11 August 2003	CD	Standard	Warp	WARPCD106	
United Kingdom	11 August 2003	CD	Special	Warp	WARPCD106X	
United Kingdom	11 August 2003	LP	Standard	Warp	WARPLP106	
United States	12 August 2003	CD	Standard	Warp	WARPCD106	
Japan	2003	CD	Standard	Beat	BRC76	
United Kingdom	9 March 2015	LP	Standard	Warp	WARPLP106R	
