= Julian House =

British musician and graphic designer

Julian House is a graphic designer, a musician, and the co-owner of the Ghost Box record label. He records music as the Focus Group.

== Graphic design ==
House is associated with Intro, a London-based design/production direction company who work in many media. House is perhaps most known for his album cover design; most notably for Stereolab, Oasis, The Prodigy, Broadcast, and Razorlight amongst others.

His work is largely collage-based, and draws heavily on record sleeve design and comic book art, with an acknowledged pulp influence - in House's own words, "the 'pulp' end of things which still informs me today, as much as classic design… Strange old vinyl LPs, paperback books, found ephemera…" In the same interview, House named many artists across many disciplines as influences, ranging from Peter Saville, Saul Bass and Max Ernst to William S. Burroughs, Bryon Gysin, H. P. Lovecraft, and Lewis Carroll.

House also contributed design work to the 2012 Peter Strickland movie Berberian Sound Studio. As well as producing posters and recording studio ephemera for use within the film, he conceptualized and designed the credit sequence for the ‘film within the film’ on which the movie is based.

== Music ==
House releases music under the alias The Focus Group on the label Ghost Box, which he is co-founder of with Jim Jupp. The releases on the label tend to share a common aesthetic, both in design and sound, which draws heavily on the sound of the BBC Radiophonic Workshop, musique concrète, the soundtracks to documentaries from the 1970s, and library music.

He lists his most recent work as collaborating with Martina Topley-Bird, some public information films for Live Earth, ongoing Ghost Box work and a musical collaboration with Broadcast.
