= List of songs recorded by Godflesh =

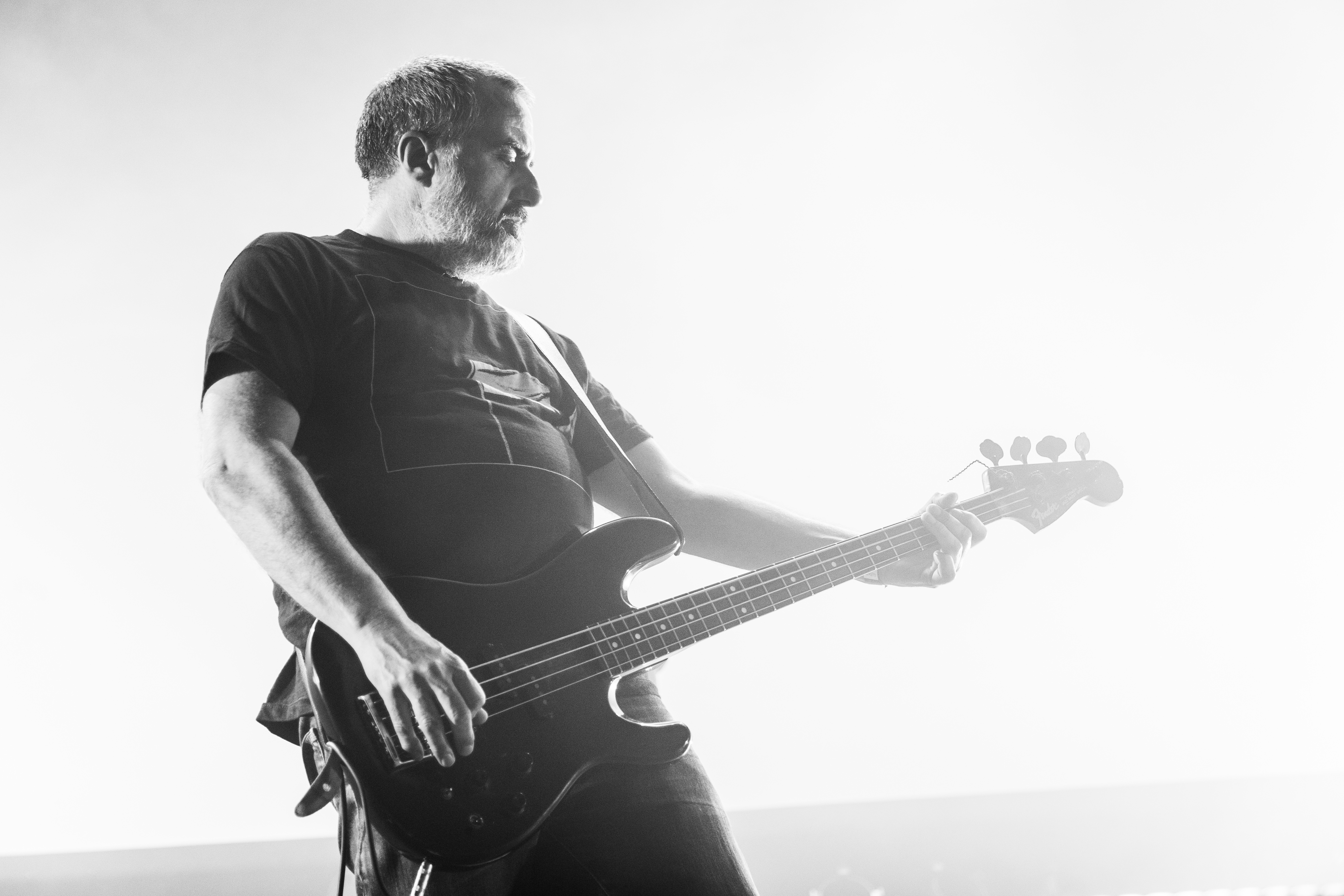
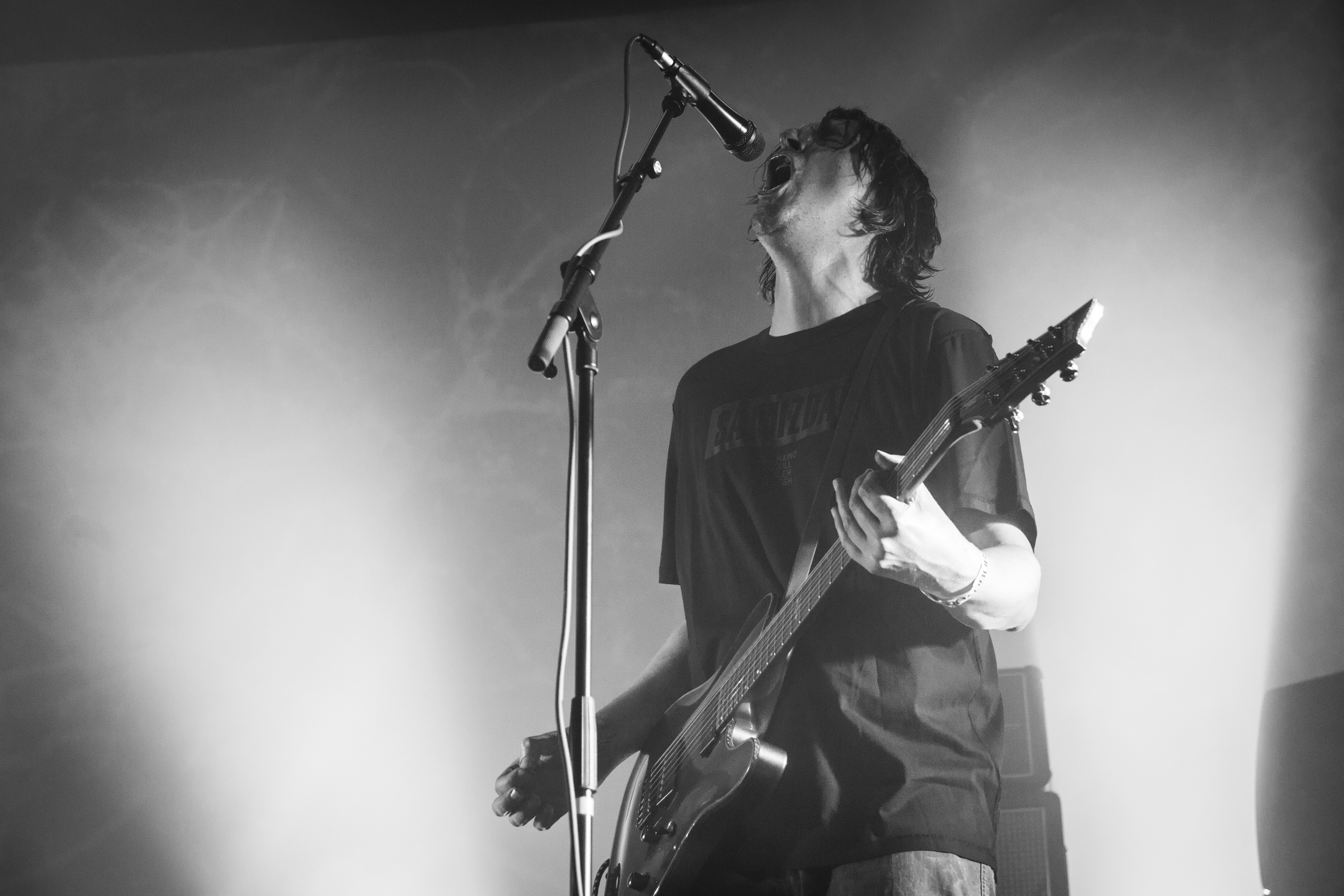
Godflesh performing at Roadburn 2018

The English industrial metal band Godflesh have released 195 songs; (Note: Additionally, Godflesh have recorded at least three songs with unknown titles that have never been released.) 135 are original tracks, 55 are remixes done by the band of their own songs and 5 are covers. The group, initially composed of B. C. Green and Paul Neville, formed in 1982 as Fall of Because but did not release any complete music until 1988 after Justin Broadrick joined, became frontman and renamed the project Godflesh. Though their debut, a self-titled EP, was released on a small, independent label named Swordfish, it was successful and drew the attention of Earache Records. After being picked up by Earache, Godflesh released the albums Streetcleaner (1989) and Pure (1992) and were then acquired by Columbia Records.

Following the disappointing sales of their third album, 1994's Selfless, and the ban of the music video for "Crush My Soul", Columbia dropped Godflesh, and the band returned to Earache. They then released Songs of Love and Hate in 1996, Love and Hate in Dub (an experimental remix album) in 1997 and Us and Them in 1999. The band again parted from Earache and released Hymns in 2001 before breaking up in 2002. Broadrick and Green reunited in 2009 with plans to create music together again, officially reformed Godflesh in 2010 and released A World Lit Only by Fire in 2014 and Post Self in 2017.

Musically, Godflesh's songs are characterised by machine percussion played in repetitive loops, driving bass and distorted guitar. Though two of their albums (Songs of Love and Hate and Hymns) featured human drummers, Broadrick saw these inclusions as a dilution of what the band set out to achieve. As pioneers of industrial metal, Godflesh's earliest songs are exceptionally slow and mechanical, employing a blend of heavy metal and industrial music. The bass and drums are unusually loud (as on the track "Avalanche Master Song" from the Godflesh EP), and the guitars and vocals play a secondary, more background role (as on "Pulp" and "Life Is Easy" from Streetcleaner). On their second album, Pure, Godflesh began to experiment with sprawling ambient pieces (as on "Pure II"), hip hop and breakbeats (as on the introductory song "Spite") and extreme degrees of heavy repetition (as on "Predominance"). Selfless saw the band taking a more straightforward metal approach, with a heavy emphasis on riffs (as on "Bigot" and "Toll"). This era of Godflesh (1988 to 1994) would retrospectively be seen as Broadrick's favorite.

Throughout their career, Godflesh have only released a handful of singles and music videos. None of their songs have charted individually despite Columbia's efforts to augment Godflesh's popularity and raise it in line with that of Nine Inch Nails. Within the band's catalogue are many remixes that were made by Broadrick. Aside from studio cover songs, Godflesh have performed "Requiem" by Killing Joke live.

== Songs ==
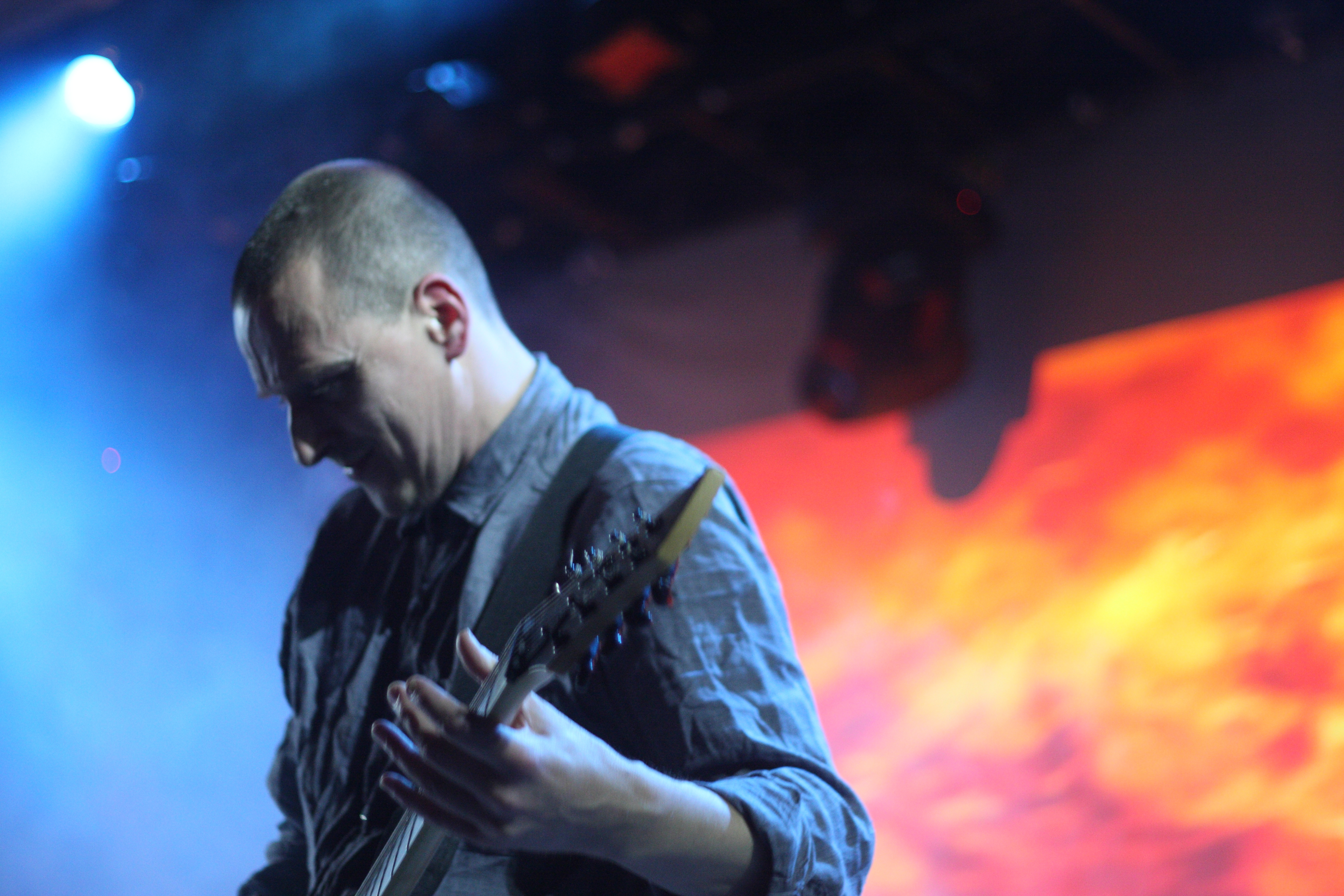
Justin Broadrick performing with Godflesh in 2015

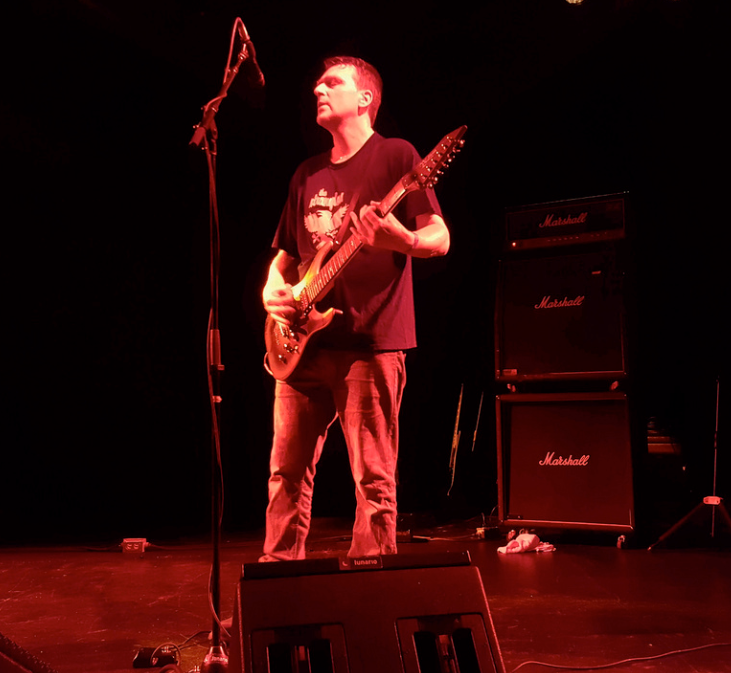
Broadrick performing with Godflesh in 2016

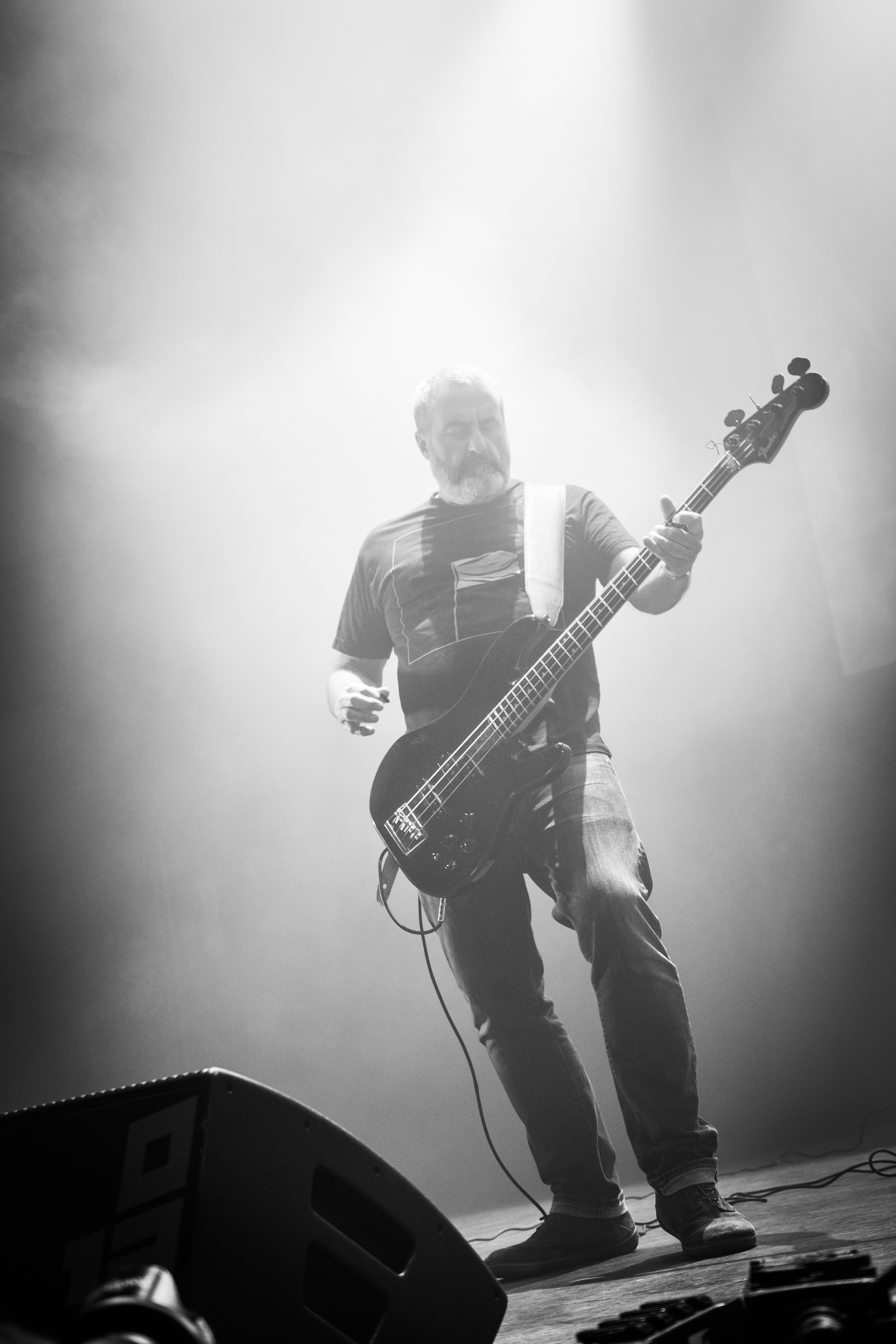
B. C. Green performing with Godflesh in 2018

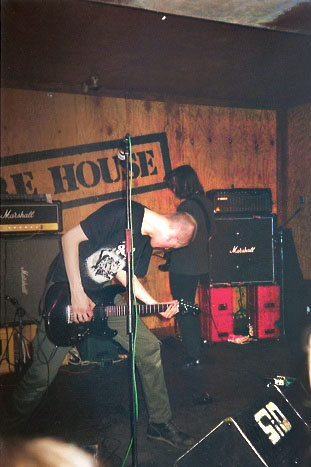
Broadrick performing with Godflesh in 1992

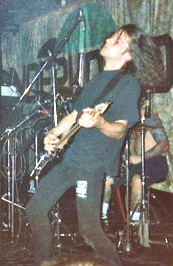
Robert Hampson of Loop performing with Godflesh in 1991

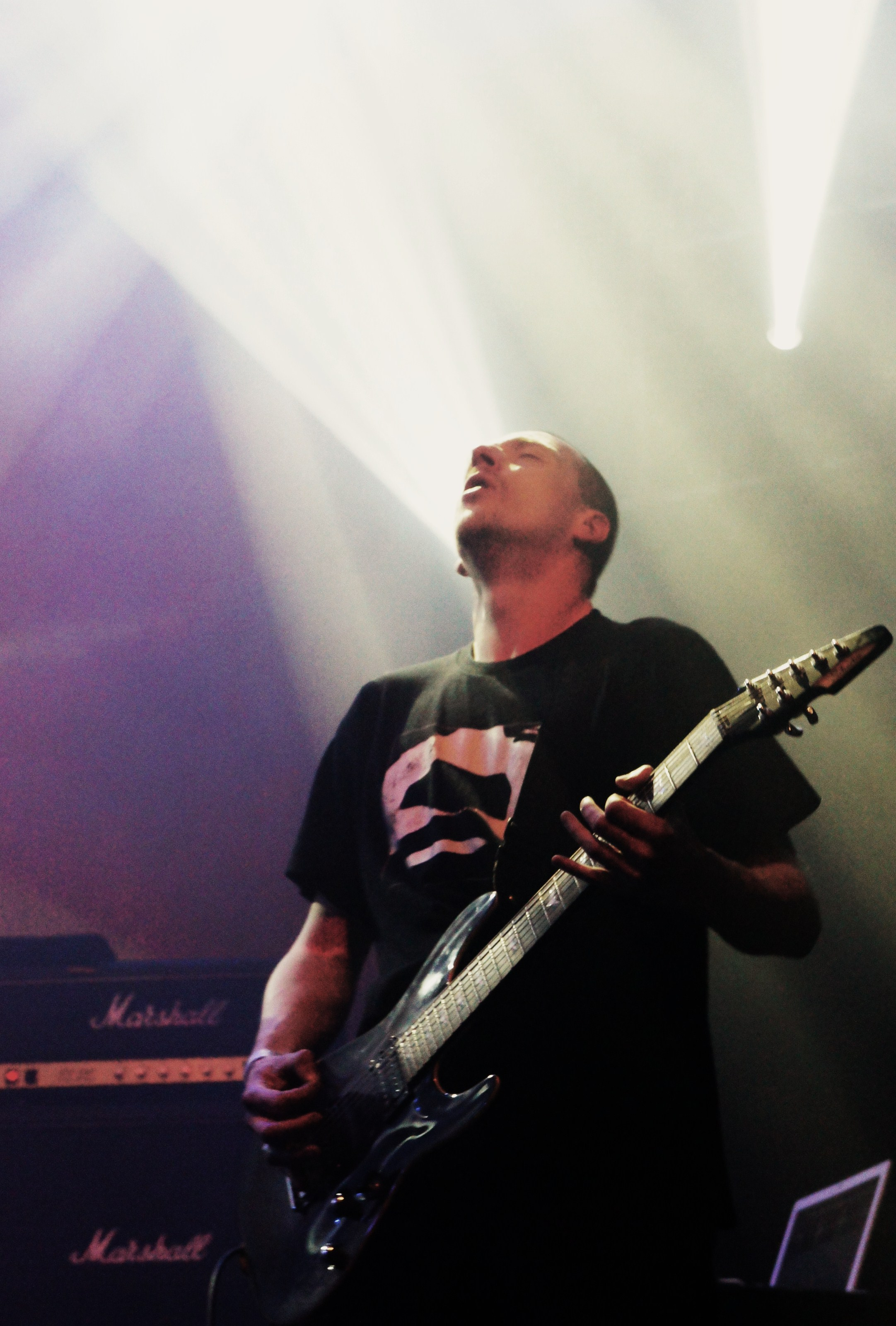
Broadrick performing with Godflesh in 2011

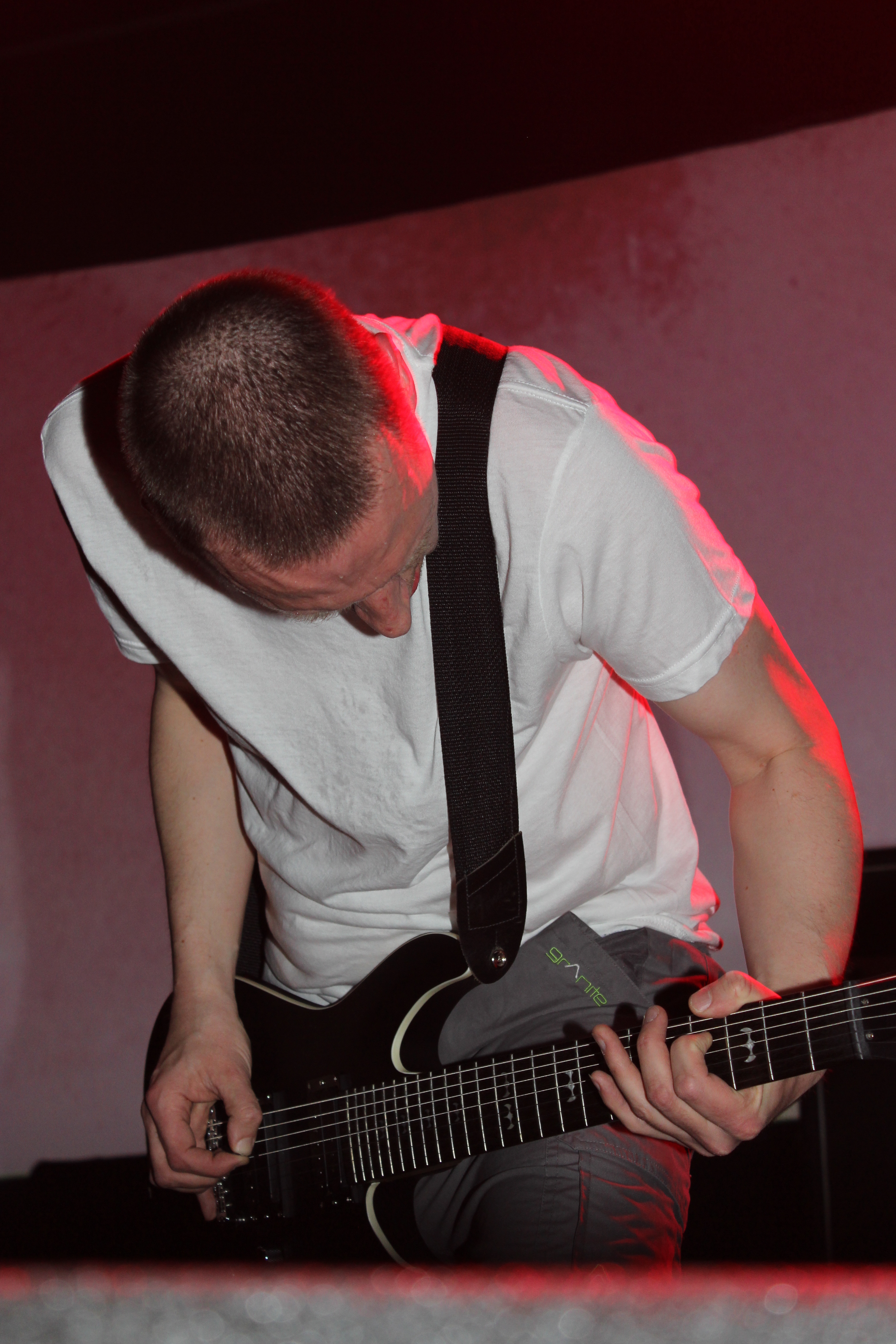
Broadrick performing with Godflesh in 2014

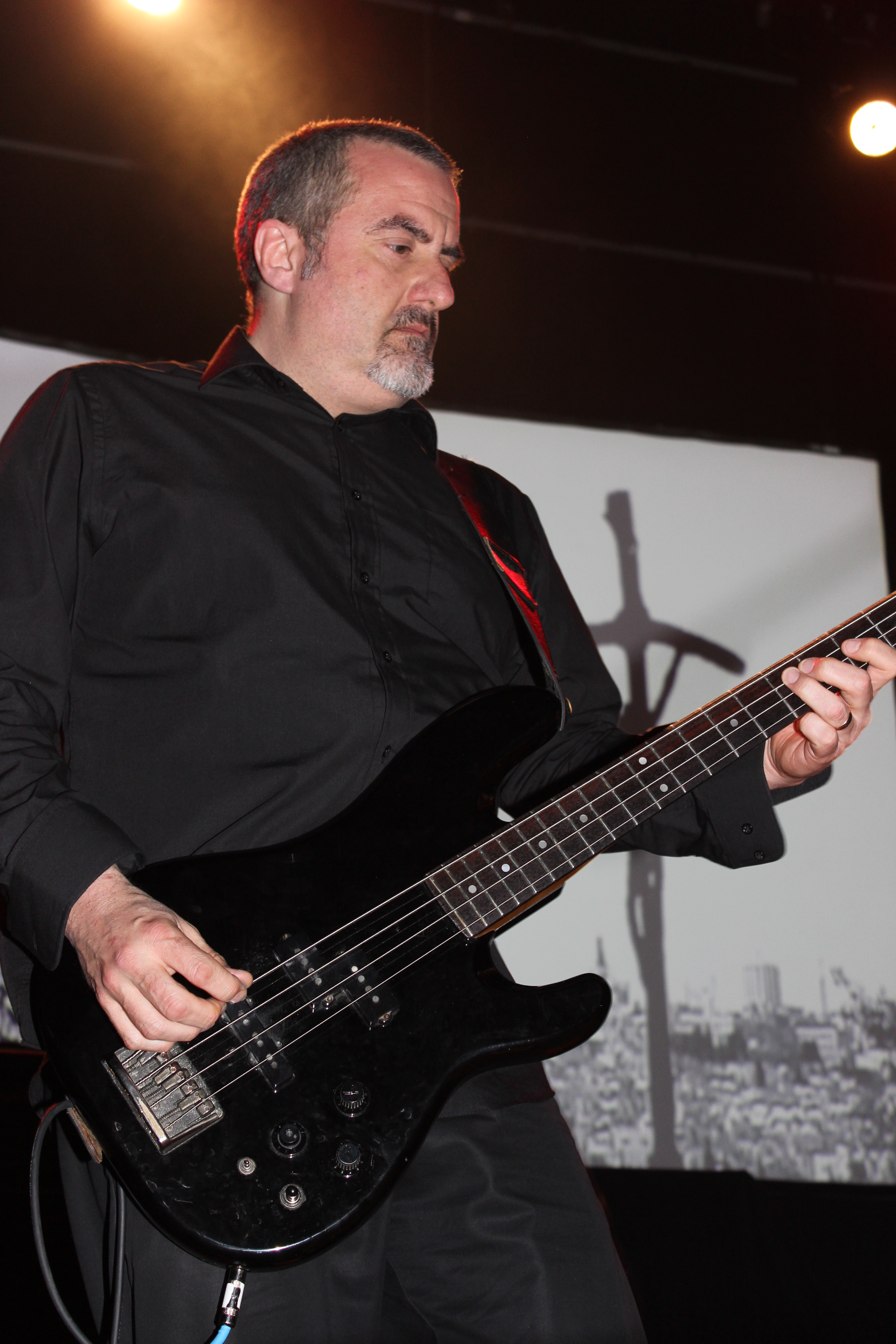
Green performing with Godflesh in 2014

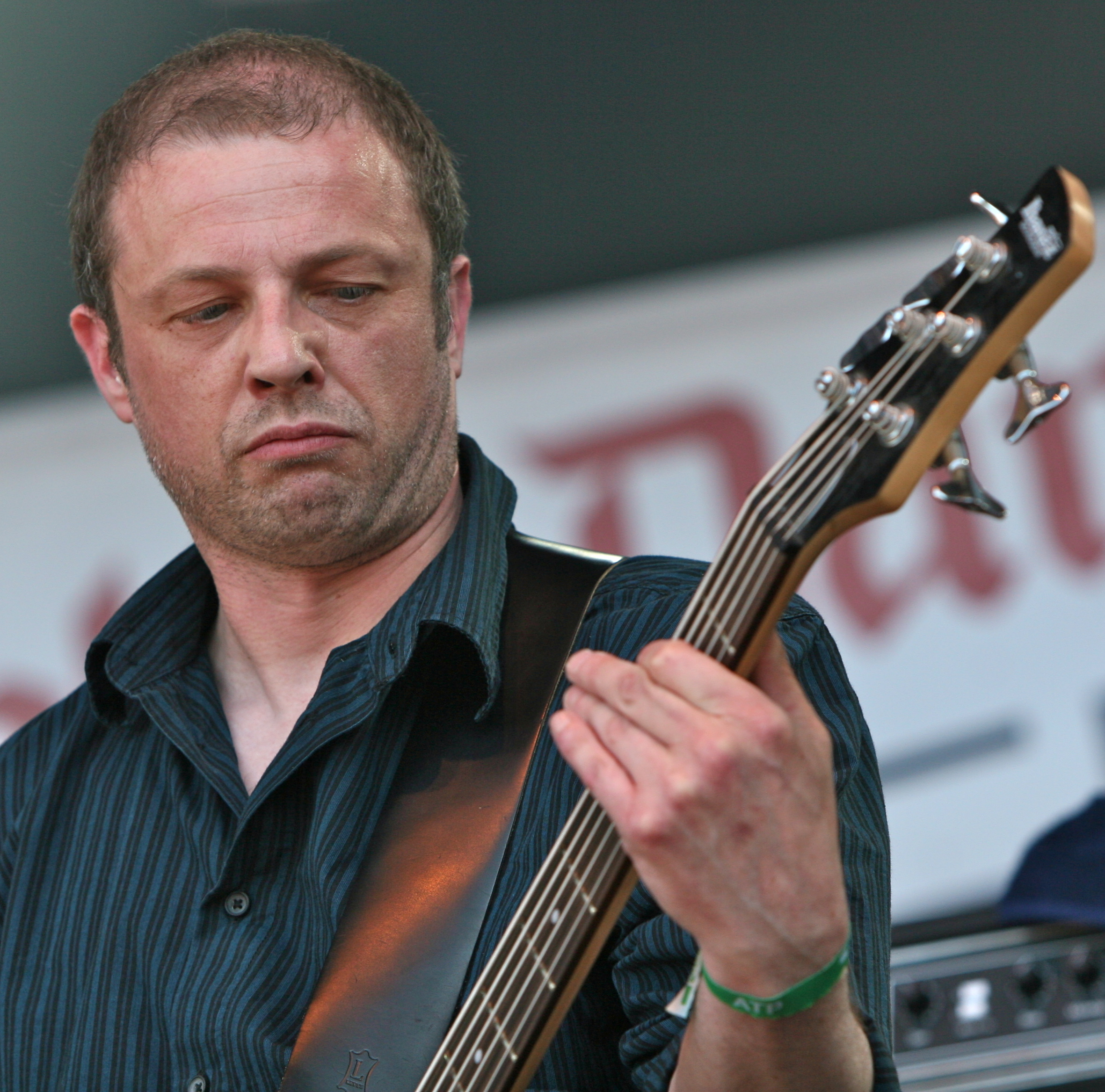
Diarmuid Dalton, an occasional member of Godflesh, performing with Broadrick's Jesu in 2009

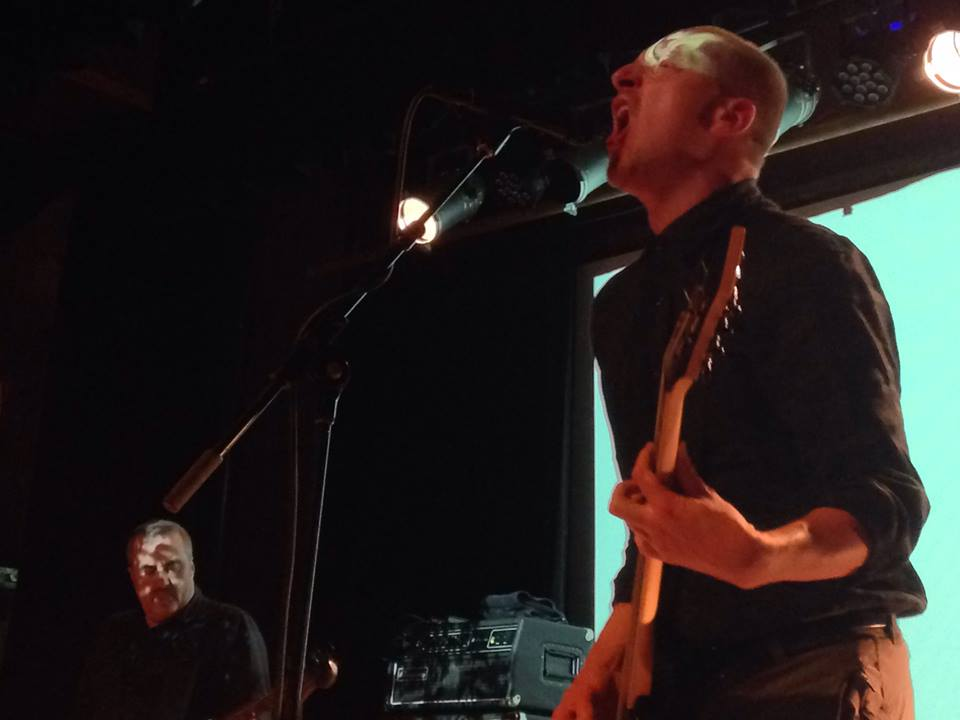
Godflesh performing in 2015

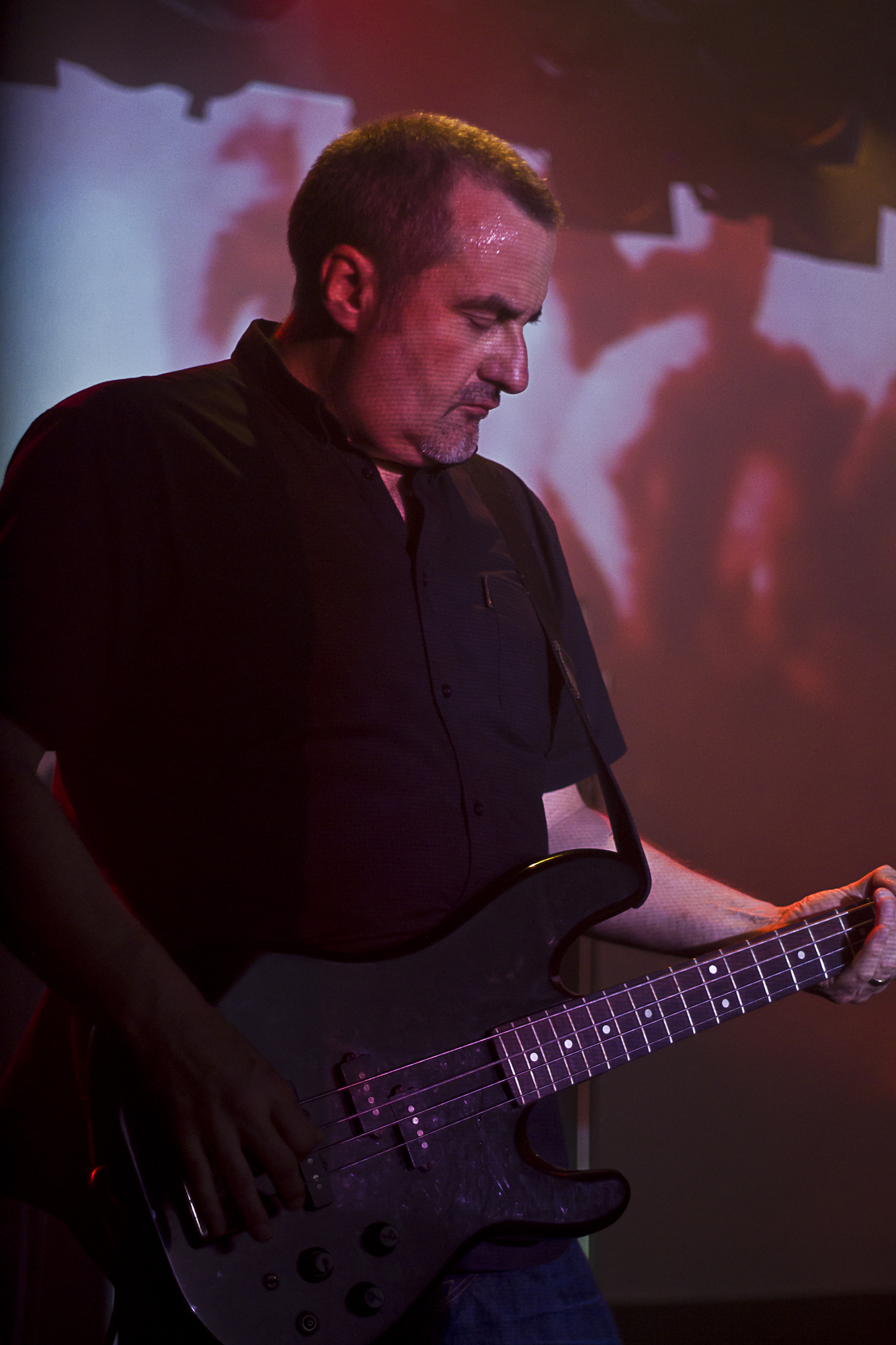
Green performing with Godflesh in 2013

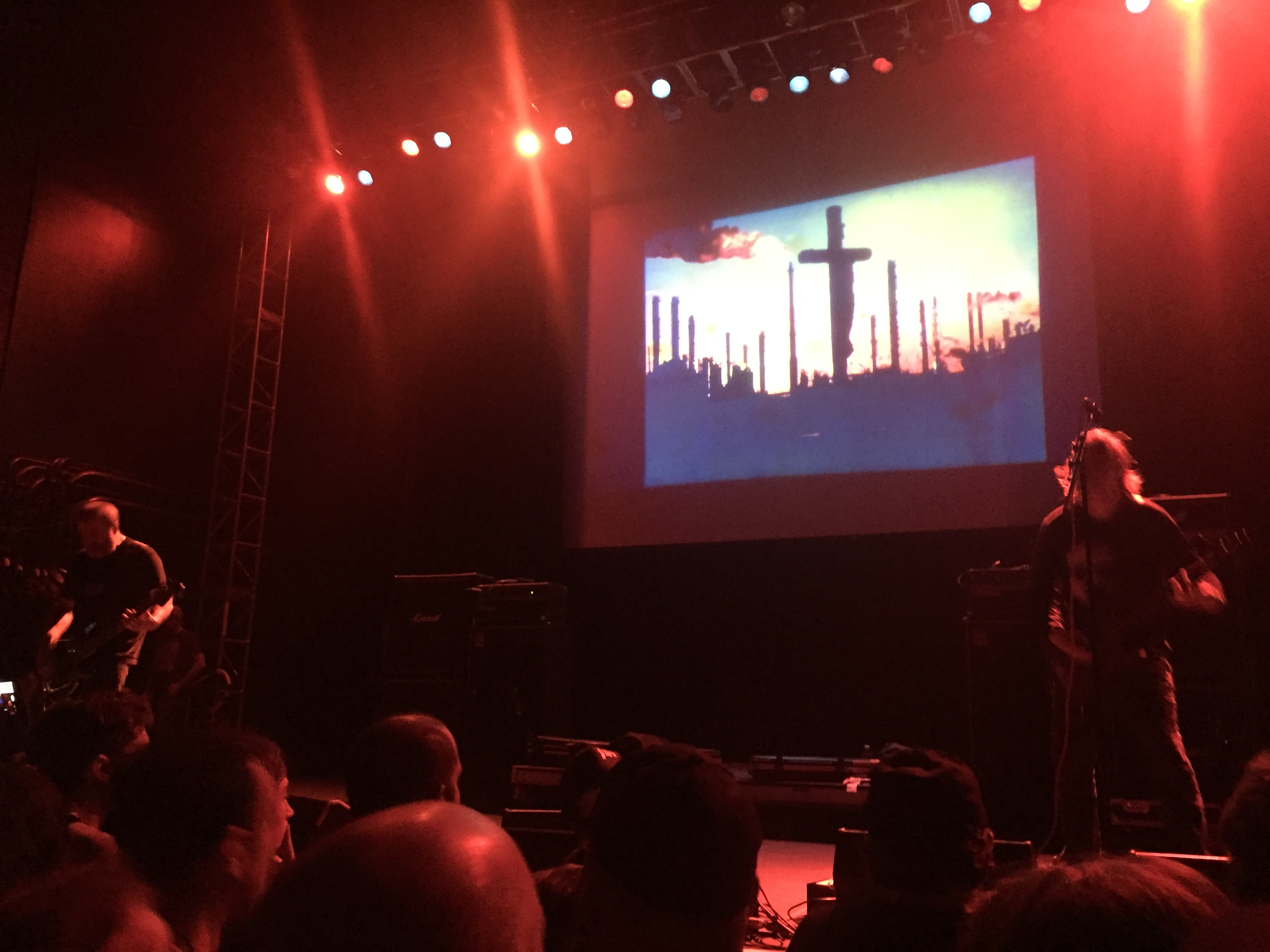
Godflesh performing in 2018

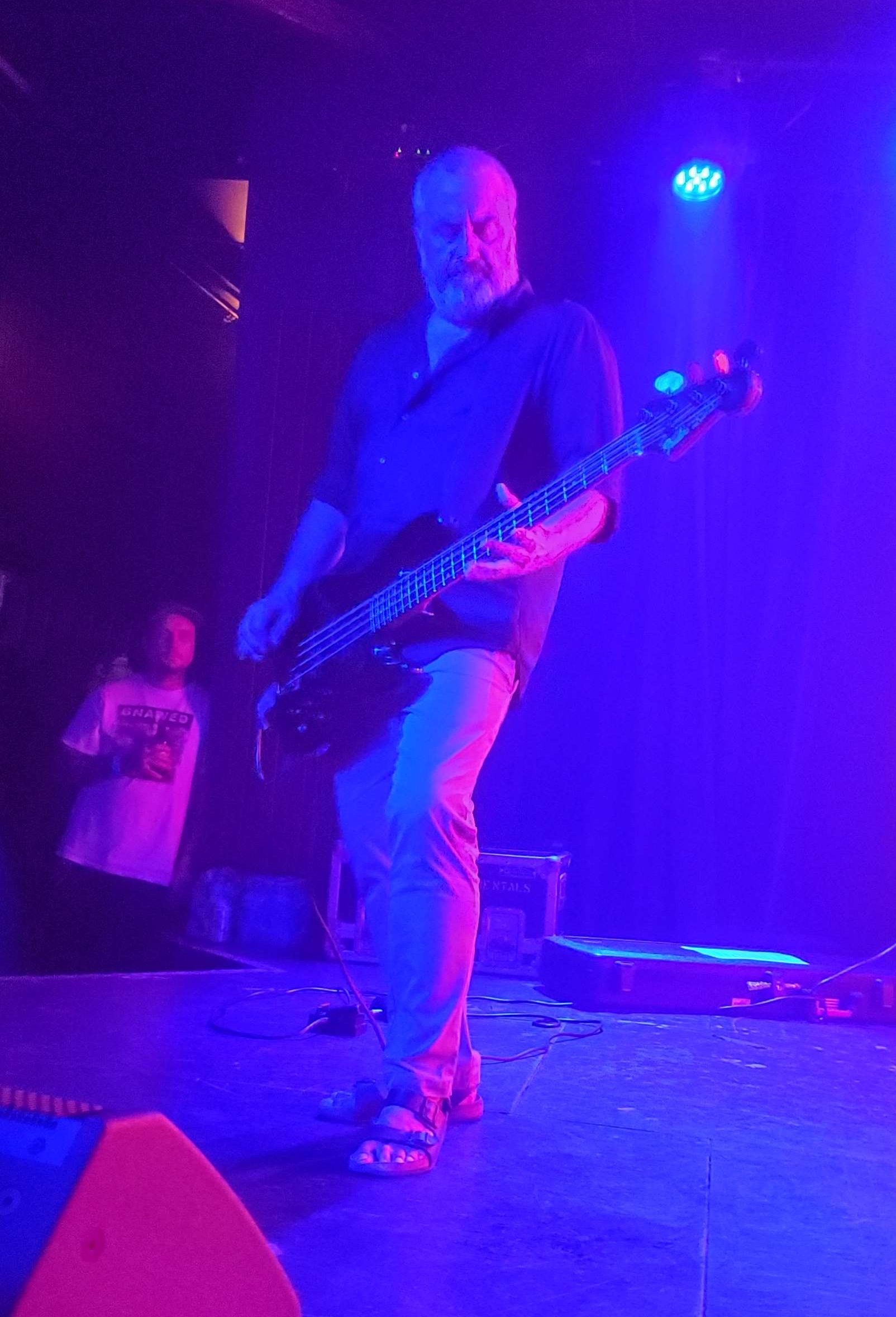
Green performing with Godflesh in 2023

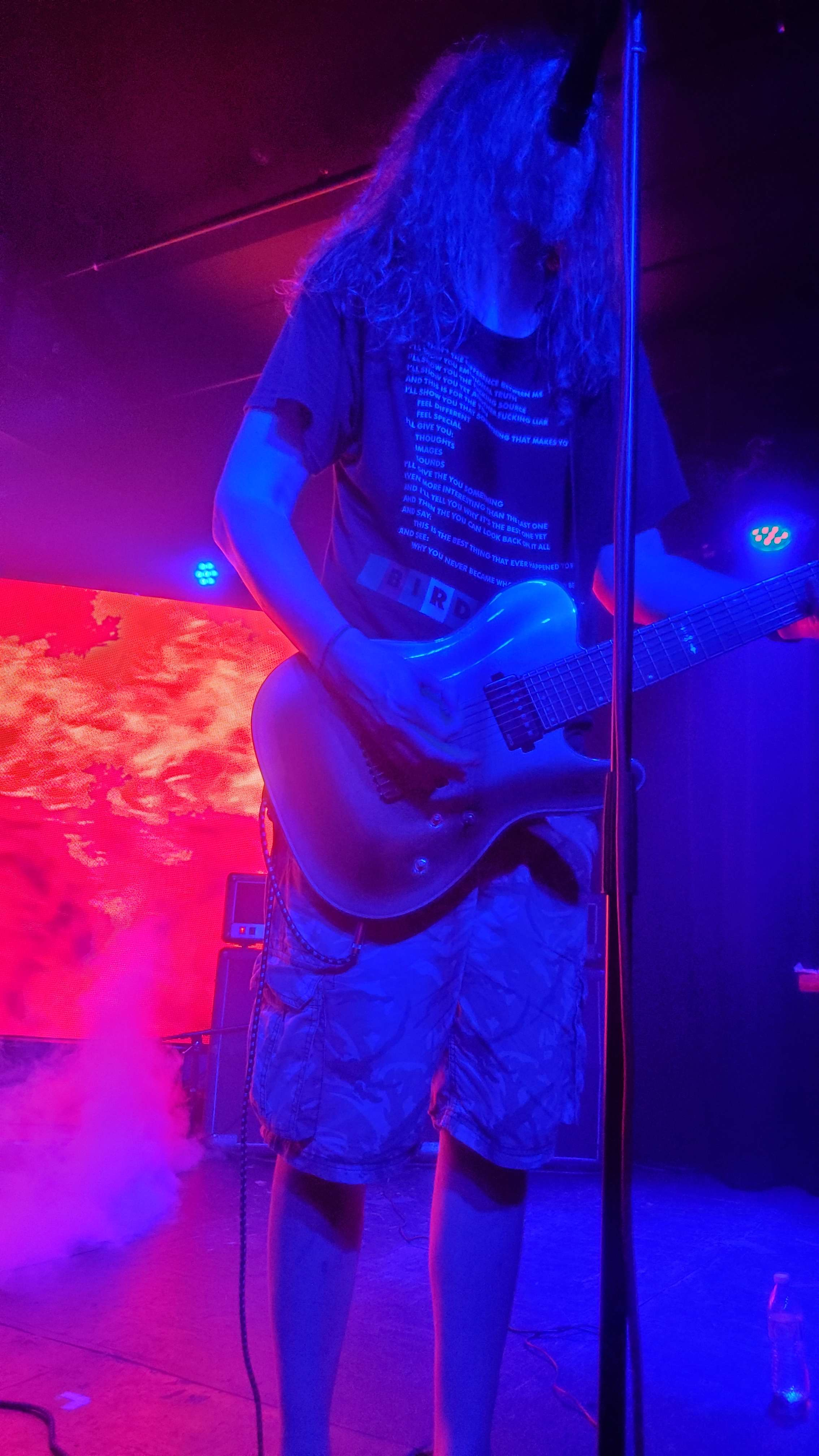
Broadrick performing with Godflesh in 2023

Key
†	Indicates a single release
#	Indicates a promotional single release
↓	Indicates an in-house remix
‡	Indicates a cover of another artist
↑	Indicates a song with a music video

Name of song, writers, original release and year released
Song	Writer(s)	Original release	Year	Ref(s).
"40 Versions" ‡	Bruce Gilbert	Whore – Various Artists Play Wire	1996	
"Absorber" (Note: This song is an altered version of "Wake" from Songs of Love and Hate (1996) with different vocals and guitar. It was made for the Mortal Kombat Annihilation (1997) soundtrack but was ultimately rejected.) ↓	Godflesh	Avalanche (Note: This was at one point the official website for several of Justin Broadrick's projects. "Absorber" was released here for exclusive download.)	1998	
"Almost Heaven"	Godflesh	Songs of Love and Hate	1996	
"Almost Heaven" (Closer Mix) ↓	Godflesh	Love and Hate in Dub	1997	
"Almost Heaven" (Helldub) ↓	Godflesh	Love and Hate in Dub	1997	
"Amoral"	Godflesh	Songs of Love and Hate	1996	
"Angel Domain"	Godflesh	Songs of Love and Hate	1996	
"Animals"	Godflesh	Hymns	2001	
"Anthem"	Godflesh	Hymns	2001	
"Antihuman"	Godflesh	Hymns	2001	
"Anything Is Mine"	Godflesh	Selfless	1994	
"Army of Non"	Godflesh	Purge	2023	
"Avalanche Master Song" ↑	Godflesh	Godflesh	1988	
"Baby Blue Eyes"	Godflesh	Pure	1992	
"Be God" #	Godflesh	Post Self	2017	
"Bigot"	Godflesh	Selfless	1994	
"Bittersweet"	Godflesh	Us and Them	1999	
"Black Boned Angel"	Godflesh	Selfless	1994	
"Blind"	Godflesh	Merciless	1994	
"Body Dome Light"	Godflesh	Selfless	1994	
"Carrion"	Godflesh	A World Lit Only by Fire	2014	
"Christbait Rising" # ↑	Godflesh	Streetcleaner	1989	
"Circle of Shit"	Godflesh	Songs of Love and Hate	1996	
"Circle of Shit" (To the Point Dub) ↓	Godflesh	Love and Hate in Dub	1997	
"Cold World"	Godflesh	Cold World	1991	
"Consume Me"	Godflesh	Decay	2026	
"Control Freak"	Godflesh	Us and Them	1999	
"Crush My Soul" † ↑	Godflesh	Selfless	1994	
"Crush My Soul" (Ultramix) ↓	Godflesh	"Crush My Soul"	1995	
"Crush My Soul" (Ultramixedit) ↓	Godflesh	In All Languages	2001	
"Curse Us All"	Godflesh	A World Lit Only by Fire	2014	
"Cursed by You All" (Note: This song is an "extended and mutated" version of "Curse Us All" from A World Lit Only by Fire.) ↓	Godflesh	A World Lit Only by Dub	2024	
"The Cyclic End"	Godflesh	Post Self	2017	
"The Cyclic End" (Dub) ↓	Godflesh	Post Self	2017	
"Dead Ending" (Note: This song is an "extended and mutated" version of "Deadend" from A World Lit Only by Fire.) ↓	Godflesh	A World Lit Only by Dub	2024	
"Dead Head" (Note: Some releases list this track as "Deadhead".)	Godflesh	Streetcleaner (Note: This song was originally recorded between 1988's Godflesh and 1989's Streetcleaner for an EP entitled Tiny Tears, but it was shelved and eventually released on Streetcleaner as an appended CD-only bonus track.)	1989	
"Deadend"	Godflesh	A World Lit Only by Fire	2014	
"Deaf, Dumb & Blind"	Godflesh	Hymns	2001	
"Decline & Fall"	Godflesh	Decline & Fall	2014	
"Defeated"	Godflesh	Hymns	2001	
"Defiled"	Godflesh	Us and Them	1999	
"Descent"	Godflesh	Us and Them	1999	
"Devastator" (Note: Some releases combine "Devastator" and "Mighty Trust Krusher" into one track.) (Note: This song was originally recorded in the early- to mid-eighties when the band went by the name Fall of Because.)	Godflesh	Streetcleaner	1989	
"Dogbite"	Godflesh	Decline & Fall	2014	
"Domain" (Note: This song is a remix of "Angel Domain" from Songs of Love and Hate.) ↓	Godflesh	Love and Hate in Dub	1997	
"Don't Bring Me Flowers"	Godflesh	Pure	1992	
"Dream Long Dead"	Godflesh	Streetcleaner	1989	
"Empyreal"	Godflesh	Selfless	1994	
"Empyreal 2" ↓	Godflesh	Rareache	1995	
"Endgames"	Godflesh	Us and Them	1999	
"F.O.D. (Fuck of Death)" ‡	Slaughter	"F.O.D. (Fuck of Death)"	2013	
"The Father"	Godflesh	Purge	2023	
"Fear of Man"	Godflesh	Decay	2026	
"Feral Colony"	Godflesh	Decay	2026	
"Flowers" (Note: This song is a deconstructed remix (or "demix", as the liner notes put it) of "Don't Bring Me Flowers" from Pure.) ↓	Godflesh	Merciless	1994	
"Fodder"	Godflesh	Decay	2026	
"For Life"	Godflesh	Hymns	2001	
"For Those About to Rock" ‡	AC/DC	Covered in Black: An Industrial Tribute to the Kings of High Voltage – AC/DC	1997	
"Forgive Our Fathers"	Godflesh	A World Lit Only by Fire	2014	
"Frail"	Godflesh	Songs of Love and Hate	1996	
"Frail" (Now Broken) ↓	Godflesh	Love and Hate in Dub	1997	
"Gateway" (Note: This song was originally recorded during the Post Self sessions.)	Godflesh	New Flesh in Dub Vol 1	2021	
"Gift from Heaven"	Godflesh	Songs of Love and Hate	1996	
"Gift from Heaven" (Breakbeat) ↓	Godflesh	Love and Hate in Dub	1997	
"Gift from Heaven" (Heavenly) ↓	Godflesh	Love and Hate in Dub	1997	
"Go Spread Your Wings"	Godflesh	Selfless	1994	
"Godhead"	Godflesh	Godflesh	1988	
"Head Dirt"	Godflesh	Streetcleaner	1989	
"Heartless"	Godflesh	Selfless	1994	
"Hunted and Consumed" ↓	Godflesh	Infected	1996	
"Hunter"	Godflesh	Songs of Love and Hate	1996	
"I Wasn't Born to Follow"	Godflesh	Pure	1992	
"I, Me, Mine"	Godflesh	Us and Them	1999	
"Ice Nerveshatter"	Godflesh	Godflesh	1988	
"If I Could Only Be What You Want"	Godflesh	Loud Music for Loud People	2002	
"Imperator" #	Godflesh	A World Lit Only by Fire	2014	
"Imperator" (Version Dub) ↓	Godflesh	A World Lit Only by Fire	2014	
"In Your Shadow"	Godflesh	Post Self	2017	
"In Your Shadow" (JK Flesh Reshape) ↓	Godflesh	Post Self	2017	
"The Infinite End"	Godflesh	Post Self	2017	
"The Internal"	Godflesh	Us and Them	1999	
"Jesu" (Note: An untitled hidden song is included in this track after a minute of silence.)	Godflesh	Hymns	2001	
"Kingdom Come"	Godflesh	Songs of Love and Hate	1996	
"Kingdom Come" (Version) ↓	Godflesh	Love and Hate in Dub	1997	
"Land Lord" #	Godflesh	Purge	2023	
"Lazarus Leper"	Godflesh	Purge	2023	
"Life Given Life Taken" (Note: This song is an "extended and mutated" version of "Life Giver Life Taker" from A World Lit Only by Fire.) ↓	Godflesh	A World Lit Only by Dub	2024	
"Life Giver Life Taker"	Godflesh	A World Lit Only by Fire	2014	
"Life Is Easy"	Godflesh	Streetcleaner	1989	
"Like Rats"	Godflesh	Streetcleaner	1989	
"Live to Lose" (Note: This song was originally recorded in 1995 but was shelved for four years before being released.)	Godflesh	Us and Them	1999	
"Living/Ending" #	Godflesh	Decay	2026	
"Locust Furnace"	Godflesh	Streetcleaner	1989	
"Love Is a Dog from Hell"	Godflesh	Pathological Compilation	1989	
"Love, Hate (Slugbaiting)"	Godflesh	Pure	1992	
"Mantra"	Godflesh	Selfless	1994	
"Master and Slave" #	Godflesh	Decay	2026	
"Meltdown"	Godflesh	Slavestate	1991	
"Merciless"	Godflesh	Merciless	1994	
"Messiah"	Godflesh	Messiah	2000	
"Messiah" (Dub) ↓	Godflesh	Messiah	2000	
"Mighty Trust Krusher"	Godflesh	Streetcleaner	1989	
"Mirror of Finite Light"	Godflesh	Post Self	2017	
"Monotremata"	Godflesh	Pure	1992	
"Mortality Sorrow"	Godflesh	Post Self	2017	
"Mothra" # ↑	Godflesh	Pure	1992	
"My Own Light"	Godflesh	Pathological Compilation	1989	
"Mythology of Self"	Godflesh	Purge	2023	
"Nail"	Godflesh	Us and Them	1999	
"Nero" †	Godflesh	"Nero"	2023	
"Nero" (Alt Version) ↓	Godflesh	"Nero"	2023	
"Nero" (Dub) ↓	Godflesh	"Nero"	2023	
"Nero" (Remix) ↓	Godflesh	"Nero"	2023	
"New Dark Ages" #	Godflesh	A World Lit Only by Fire	2014	
"New Dark Ages" (Dissolve Mix) ↓	Godflesh	Cold Waves 2020 Compilation	2020	
"New Dark Dub" ↓	Godflesh	A World Lit Only by Fire	2014	
"Newspite" (Note: This song is a remix of "Spite" from Pure.) ↓	Godflesh	Corporate Rock Wars	1994	
"Nihil"	Godflesh	Cold World	1991	
"Nihil" (No Belief Mix) ↓	Godflesh	Cold World	1991	
"Nihil" (Total Belief Mix) ↓	Godflesh	Cold World	1991	
"No Body"	Godflesh	Post Self	2017	
"Obeyed"	Godflesh	A World Lit Only by Fire	2014	
"Our Fathers in Heaven" (Note: This song is an "extended and mutated" version of "Forgive Our Fathers" from A World Lit Only by Fire.) ↓	Godflesh	A World Lit Only by Dub	2024	
"Paralyzed"	Godflesh	Hymns	2001	
"Parasite"	Godflesh	Post Self	2017	
"Parasite" (Alternate Version) ↓	Godflesh	Post Self	2017	
"Perfect Skin"	Godflesh	Slavestate	1991	
"Perfect Skin" (Dub) ↓	Godflesh	Slavestate Remixes	1991	
"Permission"	Godflesh	Purge	2023	
"Playing with Fire"	Godflesh	Decline & Fall	2014	
"Playing with Fire" (Dub) ↓	Godflesh	Decline & Fall	2014	
"Post Self" †	Godflesh	Post Self	2017	
"Pre Self"	Godflesh	Post Self	2017	
"Predominance"	Godflesh	Pure	1992	
"Pulp" #	Godflesh	Streetcleaner	1989	
"Pure"	Godflesh	Pure	1992	
"Pure II"	Godflesh	Pure	1992	
"Pure Spite" (Note: This song is a remix combining elements of "Pure" and "Spite" from Pure.) ↓	Godflesh	Funky Alternatives Eight	1995	
"Regal"	Godflesh	Hymns	2001	
"Ringer" #	Godflesh	Decline & Fall	2014	
"Ringer" (Dub) ↓	Godflesh	Decline & Fall	2014	
"Scapegoat"	Godflesh	Messiah	2000	
"Scapegoat" (Dub) ↓	Godflesh	Messiah	2000	
"Shut Me Down"	Godflesh	A World Lit Only by Fire	2014	
"Shut Me Down" (Version) ↓	Godflesh	A World Lit Only by Fire	2014	
"Slateman" †	Godflesh	"Slateman"	1991	
"Slavestate" ↑	Godflesh	Slavestate	1991	
"Slavestate" (Radio Slave) ↓	Godflesh	Slavestate Remixes	1991	
"Slavestate" (Total State Mix) ↓	Godflesh	Slavestate Remixes	1991	
"Someone Somewhere Scorned"	Godflesh	Slavestate	1991	
"Spinebender"	Godflesh	Godflesh	1988	
"Spite"	Godflesh	Pure	1992	
"Sterile Prophet"	Godflesh	Songs of Love and Hate	1996	
"Sterile Prophet" (Empty Messiah Mix) ↓	Godflesh	Future Shock	1996	
"Sterile Prophet" (In Dub) ↓	Godflesh	Love and Hate in Dub	1997	
"Sterile Prophet" (Version) ↓	Godflesh	Love and Hate in Dub	1997	
"Straight to Your Heart" ‡	Loop	Loopflesh/Fleshloop	1991	
"Streetcleaner"	Godflesh	Streetcleaner	1989	
"Streetcleaner 2" ↓	Godflesh	Godflesh	1990 (Note: This song only appears on a reissued version of the release.)	
"Suction"	Godflesh	Streetcleaner	1989	
"Sungod"	Godflesh	Messiah	2000	
"Sungod" (Dub) ↓	Godflesh	Messiah	2000	
"Time, Death and Wastefulness"	Godflesh	Songs of Love and Hate	1996	
"Time, Death and Wastefulness" (In Dub) ↓	Godflesh	Love and Hate in Dub	1997	
"Tiny Tears"	Godflesh	Streetcleaner	1989	
"Toll"	Godflesh	Selfless	1994	
"Towers" (Note: This song is an "extended and mutated" version of "Towers of Emptiness" from A World Lit Only by Fire.) ↓	Godflesh	A World Lit Only by Dub	2024	
"Towers of Emptiness"	Godflesh	A World Lit Only by Fire	2014	
"Tyrant"	Godflesh	Hymns	2001	
"Unworthy"	Godflesh	Merciless	1994	
"Us and Them"	Godflesh	Us and Them	1999	
"Us and Them" (Defensive Remix) ↓	Godflesh	In All Languages (Note: This song was originally created for Us and Them in Dub, a remix album that was never released.)	2001	
"Vampires"	Godflesh	Hymns	2001	
"Veins"	Godflesh	Godflesh	1988	
"Voidhead"	Godflesh	Hymns	2001	
"Wake"	Godflesh	Songs of Love and Hate	1996	
"Wake" (Break Mix) ↓	Godflesh	Love and Hate in Dub	1997	
"Weak Flesh"	Godflesh	Godflesh	1988	
"White Flag"	Godflesh	Hymns	2001	
"Whose Truth Is Your Truth"	Godflesh	Us and Them	1999	
"Wilderness of Mirrors"	Godflesh	Messiah	2000	
"Wilderness of Mirrors" (Dub) ↓	Godflesh	Messiah	2000	
"Witchhunt"	Godflesh	Us and Them	1999	
"Witchhunt" (Tyrant Remix) ↓	Godflesh	In All Languages	2001	
"Wound '91" (Note: This song is a rerecording of "Wound" from the Tiny Tears bonus tracks on Streetcleaner.)	Godflesh	"Slateman"	1991	
"Wound"	Godflesh	Streetcleaner	1989	
"Wounds" ↓	Godflesh	Godflesh	1990	
"Xnoybis" #	Godflesh	Selfless	1994	
"Xnoybis" (Clubdub) ↓	Godflesh	"Xnoybis"	1995	
"Xnoybis" (Clubdubedit) ↓	Godflesh	In All Languages	2001	
"Xnoybis" (Edit) ↓	Godflesh	"Xnoybis"	1995	
"Xnoybis" (Psychofuckdub) ↓	Godflesh	"Xnoybis"	1995	
"You Are the Judge, the Jury, and the Executioner"	Godflesh	Purge	2023	
"Your Nature Your Nurture"	Godflesh	New Flesh in Dub Vol 1	2021	
"Zero the Hero" ‡	Tony Iommi; Bill Ward; Geezer Butler; Ian Gillan	Masters of Misery – Black Sabbath: An Earache Tribute	1992	

== Demos, live recordings and remixes for other artists ==
=== Demos ===
Song	Original release	Year released	Year recorded	Ref.
"Anthem" (Demo 2012 Remaster)	Hymns	2013	2001	
"Be Grateful"	Extirpate (Note: This song was released by Fall of Because, an early version of Godflesh.)	1986	1986	
"Christbait Rising" (Original Unreleased Mix)	Streetcleaner	2010	1989	
"Christian Motherfucker"	Extirpate	1986	1986	
"Deadhead" (Original Demo Guitar & Machine 1988)	Streetcleaner	2010	1988	
"Deaf, Dumb & Blind" (Demo 2012 Remaster)	Hymns	2013	2001	
"Devastator"	Life Is Easy	1999	1986	
"Dream Long Dead" (Original Unreleased Mix)	Streetcleaner	2010	1989	
"Ecstacy of Hate"	Extirpate	1986	1986	
"Empire of Lies"	Extirpate	1986	1986	
"For Life" (Demo 2012 Remaster)	Hymns	2013	2001	
"Grind"	Extirpate	1986	1986	
"Grind" (Manipulation '91)	Mortar	1992	1991	
"Head Dirt" (Original Unreleased Mix)	Streetcleaner	2010	1989	
"Intro"	Extirpate	1986	1986	
"Life Is Easy"	Extirpate	1986	1986	
"Life Fucker, Shit Sucker" (Note: This song was later released as "Lifefucker-Shitsucker".)	Extirpate	1986	1986	
"Like Rats" (Original Unreleased Mix)	Streetcleaner	2010	1989	
"Male Whore Slag" (Note: This song was later released as "Malewhoreslag".)	Extirpate	1986	1986	
"Merciless"	Extirpate	1986	1986	
"Middle America" (Note: This song was later released as "Middle Amerika".)	Extirpate	1986	1986	
"Paralyzed" (Demo 2012 Remaster)	Hymns	2013	2001	
"Pulp" (Original Unreleased Mix)	Streetcleaner	2010	1989	
"Suction" (Original Demo Guitar & Machine 1988)	Streetcleaner	2010	1988	
"Vampires" (Demo 2012 Mix)	Hymns	2013	2001	
"Voidhead" (Demo 2012 Mix)	Hymns	2013	2001	
"White Rock, Black Death"	Extirpate	1986	1986	

=== Live recordings ===
Song	Original release	Year released	Year recorded	Ref.
"Baby Blue Eyes"	Pure : Live	2022	2013	
"Christbait Rising"	Streetcleaner: Live at Roadburn 2011	2013	2011	
"Christbait Rising" (Rehearsal April 1989)	Streetcleaner	2010	1989	
"Cold World"	Pure : Live	2022	2013	
"Dead Head"	Streetcleaner: Live at Roadburn 2011	2013	2011	
"Devastator / Mighty Trust Krusher"	Streetcleaner: Live at Roadburn 2011	2013	2011	
"Don't Bring Me Flowers"	Pure : Live	2022	2013	
"Dream Long Dead"	Streetcleaner: Live at Roadburn 2011	2013	2011	
"Dream Long Dead" (Rehearsal April 1989)	Streetcleaner	2010	1989	
"Fight Show" (Note: This track comprises a fifteen-minute live performance of Fall of Because, including the songs "Empire of Lies", "Whiterock-Blackdeath", "Christian Motherfucker" and "Ecstacy of Hate".)	Life Is Easy	1999	1986	
"Head Dirt"	Streetcleaner: Live at Roadburn 2011	2013	2011	
"Head Dirt" (Live Geneva Early 1990)	Streetcleaner	2010	1990	
"I Wasn't Born to Follow"	Pure : Live	2022	2013	
"Life Is Easy"	Streetcleaner: Live at Roadburn 2011	2013	2011	
"Like Rats"	Streetcleaner: Live at Roadburn 2011	2013	2011	
"Like Rats" (Peel Session) (Note: Though not explicitly labeled as such on the track listing of its original release, this song was recorded at a Peel session.)	Grind Madness at the BBC	2009	1989	
"Locust Furnace"	Streetcleaner: Live at Roadburn 2011	2013	2011	
"Monotremata"	Pure : Live	2022	2013	
"Mothra"	Pure : Live	2022	2013	
"Predominance"	Pure : Live	2022	2013	
"Pulp"	Streetcleaner: Live at Roadburn 2011	2013	2011	
"Pulp" (Peel Session)	In All Languages	2001	1989	
"Pulp" (Rehearsal May 1989)	Streetcleaner	2010	1989	
"Pure"	Pure : Live	2022	2013	
"Pure 2"	Pure : Live	2022	2013	
"Spite"	Pure : Live	2022	2013	
"Streetcleaner"	Streetcleaner: Live at Roadburn 2011	2013	2011	
"Streetcleaner" (Live Geneva Early 1990)	Streetcleaner	2010	1990	
"Suction"	Streetcleaner: Live at Roadburn 2011	2013	2011	
"Survive"	Life Is Easy	1999	1987	
"Tiny Tears"	Streetcleaner: Live at Roadburn 2011	2013	2011	
"Tiny Tears" (Peel Session)	In All Languages	2001	1989	
"Wound (Not Wound)" (Peel Session)	Grind Madness at the BBC	2009	1989	
"Wound"	Streetcleaner: Live at Roadburn 2011	2013	2011	
"Xmas Special" (Note: This track comprises a fifteen-minute live performance of Fall of Because, including the songs "Life Is Easy", "Calling" and "Submit-Suppress".)	Life Is Easy	1999	1986	

=== Remixes for other artists ===
Justin Broadrick has created a number of remixes over his career, and the distinction between a Broadrick remix and a Godflesh remix is often unclear; there is little effective difference since Broadrick is Godflesh's main creative force and sole remixer. The ones listed below are explicitly labeled with the Godflesh title or are inextricably tied to Godflesh (such as the two remixes for Pantera). (Note: This remix is credited to Justin Broadrick (the Godflesh frontman), but it uses the same remix title that he employed for Godflesh songs on the Merciless EP. In 1997, Broadrick referred to the remix as something "we" did, speaking of him and B. C. Green, the two constituents of Godflesh.) For a more complete list of Broadrick's remixes, see his discography.

Song	Original artist(s)	Original release	Year	Ref.
"21st Century Man" (Godflesh Remix)	The Membranes	Inner Space/Outer Space	2016	
"Ashen"	Lustmord	The Others (Lustmord Deconstructed)	2022	
"By Demons Be Driven" (Biomechanical Mix)	Pantera	Walk	1993	
"Fucking Hostile" (Biomechanical Mix)	Pantera	Walk	1993	
"Godflesh Style"	Evan Dando; Tom Morgan	"Style" / "Godflesh Style"	1994	
"The Great Leap" (Godflesh Extended Version)	Mortiis	Weal & Woe	2018	
"The Great Leap" (Godflesh Remix)	Mortiis	The Great Leap	2017	
"Inversion" (Godflesh Remix)	Khost	Needles into the Ground – Deconstructed and Reconstructed by Godflesh	2016	
"Revelations Vultures Jackals Wolves" (Godflesh Remix)	Khost	Needles into the Ground – Deconstructed and Reconstructed by Godflesh	2016	
"A Shadow on the Wound" (Godflesh Remix)	Khost	Needles into the Ground – Deconstructed and Reconstructed by Godflesh	2016	
"Swarm" (Remix by Justin K. Broadrick / Godflesh)	Controlled Bleeding	Carving Songs	2017	
