= Godflesh discography =

Band discography

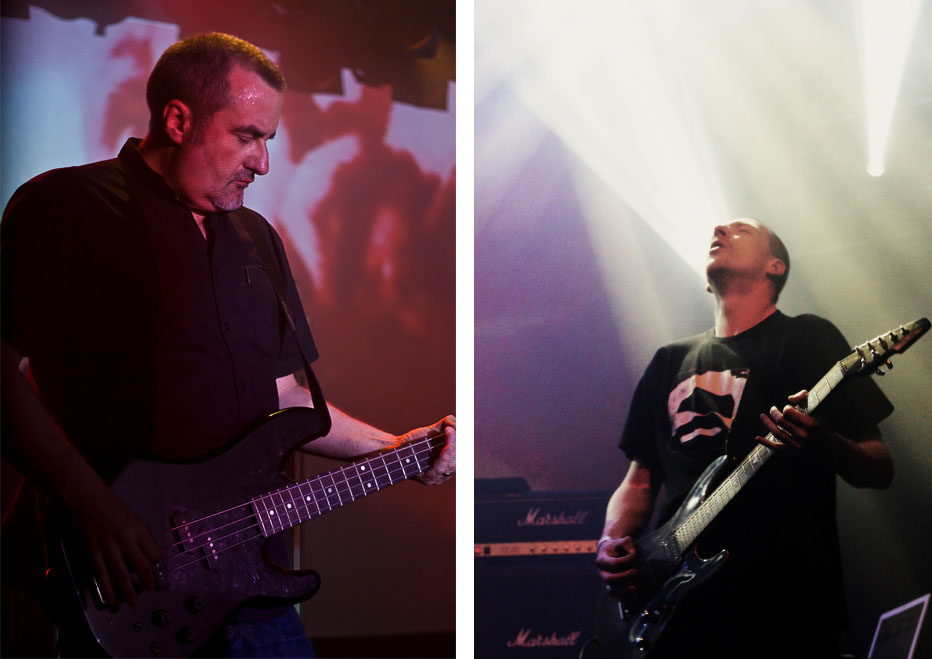
- Godflesh performing reunion concerts in the early 2010s. Left to right: B. C. Green and Justin Broadrick
- Studio albums: 10
- Extended plays: 6
- Live albums: 3
- Compilation albums: 5
- Singles: 16
- Video albums: 1
- Music videos: 5
- Remix albums: 3

The English industrial metal band Godflesh have released nine studio albums and six extended plays along with a number of singles, compilations and remix and live albums. The group formed in 1982 under the name Fall of Because, but they did not release any music (outside of a 1986 demo tape titled Extirpate) until 1988 when Justin Broadrick and B. C. Green changed the project's name to Godflesh and recorded a self-titled debut EP. That EP, released through the independent label Swordfish, was met with underground success and has since been recognised as one of the first industrial metal releases, if not the first.

Though the self-titled EP acted as Godflesh's introduction to innovation and experimentation, their next release and first through Earache Records, 1989's Streetcleaner, garnered even more recognition for its musical importance. After the success of Streetcleaner, Godflesh recorded Pure in 1992, which has drawn retrospective recognition as a significant release in the post-metal genre. The band's third album, Selfless (1994), was Godflesh's debut on Columbia Records. The album sold under expectations, and that coupled with MTV banning the music video of its lead single, "Crush My Soul", led to Columbia dropping support of Godflesh. Regardless of the disappointing commercial performance of Selfless, Broadrick considers that album and all of the preceding releases as Godflesh's best material.

In 1996, Godflesh, back on Earache, released Songs of Love and Hate, which featured Bryan Mantia on drums; this was a significant departure from the band's characteristic style, since all of their previous releases had been structured around programmed industrial beats from a drum machine. Broadrick later described this shift as a dilution of Godflesh's original goal, which was to meld human and machine music. Love and Hate in Dub, a remix album released in 1997, saw Godflesh again experimenting, this time with hip hop, breakbeats and dub. Those experiments continued and heightened with the 1999 studio album Us and Them, which again featured machine percussion. After Us and Them proved creatively dissatisfying for Broadrick, the band found a new live drummer (this time in Ted Parsons). Hymns (2001) was recorded in a professional studio, which led to a great deal of frustration for the band. Shortly after Hymns' release, Green quit Godflesh, and Broadrick officially ended the band not long after that.

Godflesh reformed in 2010 as Broadrick and Green. After performing scattered shows for four years, the band's return album, A World Lit Only by Fire (2014), was released to critical acclaim and appeared on several critics' year-end lists. It was a notably heavy industrial metal album focused again on downtuned guitar, distorted bass and driving machine drums. In 2017, Godflesh's eighth album, Post Self, was released. Like A World Lit Only by Fire, it drew critical praise and award recognition; unlike that previous album, however, Post Self proved introspective and experimental. Despite regular acclaim from critics and fellow musicians, Godflesh have received only minor commercial success.

== Albums ==
=== Studio albums ===
Title	Album details	Peak chart positions								Notes
Title	Album details	UK Sales	UK Indie (Note: UK Independent Singles and Albums Charts for: Streetcleaner; Selfless; Others)	UK Metal	US Sales	US Heat	US Taste	FRE Metal	GRE	Notes
Streetcleaner	Released: 13 November 1989; Label: Earache Records (MOSH 15); Format: CD, cassette, vinyl	—	19	—	—	—	—	—	45	CD versions include the otherwise unreleased Tiny Tears EP as a set of bonus tracks; Remastered and reissued in 2010 with a second disc of bonus tracks; Was performed in its entirety at Roadburn 2011
Pure	Released: 13 April 1992; Label: Earache Records (MOSH 32); Format: CD, cassette, vinyl	—	—	—	—	—	—	—	—	Was performed in its entirety at Roadburn 2013
Selfless	Released: 18 October 1994; Label: Earache/Columbia Records (MOSH 85); Format: CD, cassette, vinyl	—	12	—	—	—	—	—	—	Was performed in its entirety at Roadburn 2018; Sold approximately 180,000 copies
Songs of Love and Hate	Released: 20 August 1996; Label: Earache Records (MOSH 157); Format: CD, cassette, vinyl	—	—	33	—	—	—	—	—	The first Godflesh album with a human drummer instead of a machine one; Followed by a 1997 remix album entitled Love and Hate in Dub
Us and Them	Released: 8 June 1999; Label: Earache Records (MOSH 179); Format: CD	—	—	20	—	—	—	—	—	Again featured machine percussion; Intended to be followed by a remix album entitled Us and Them in Dub, but it was never completed
Hymns	Released: 23 October 2001; Label: Music for Nations (CDMFN 271); Format: CD, cassette, vinyl	—	—	—	—	—	—	—	—	Godflesh's final album before dissolution in 2002; The band's second and final album with a live drummer; Remastered and reissued in 2013 with a second disc of bonus tracks
A World Lit Only by Fire	Released: 7 October 2014; Label: Avalanche Recordings (AREC 034); Format: CD, vinyl, digital download	—	47	25	—	22	25	—	—	Followed by a 2024 remix album entitled A World Lit Only by Dub
Post Self	Released: 17 November 2017; Label: Avalanche Recordings (AREC 040); Format: CD, cassette, vinyl, digital download	—	41	28	—	23	—	—	—	Released in a limited capacity on compact cassette by Hospital Productions
Purge	Released: 9 June 2023; Label: Avalanche Recordings (AREC 066); Format: CD, vinyl, digital download	87	29	—	94	—	—	—	—	Described as a continuation of the concepts from Pure
Decay	Released: 25 September 2026; Label: Relapse Records (RR7658); Format: CD, cassette, vinyl, digital download	62	30	9	38	—	—	77	—	Recorded during the Purge sessions
"—" denotes a title that did not chart or was not released in that territory.

=== Extended plays ===
Title	EP details	UK Indie	Notes
Godflesh	Released: September 1988; Label: Swordfish (FLESH LP1); Format: CD, vinyl	20	Godflesh's debut and one of the originating industrial metal releases; Reissued in 1990 with two bonus tracks after Earache Records acquired Godflesh
Slavestate	Released: July 1991; Label: Earache Records (MOSH 30); Format: CD, cassette, vinyl	—	Most releases include Slavestate Remixes and the "Slateman" single
Cold World	Released: 5 November 1991; Label: Earache Records (MOSH 56); Format: CD, cassette, vinyl	—	Recorded in 1991 during the Pure sessions
Merciless	Released: 23 August 1994; Label: Earache Records/Columbia Records (MOSH 116); Format: CD, cassette, vinyl	—	Title track derived from a Fall of Because (pre-Godflesh) song
Messiah	Released: 5 December 2000; Label: Avalanche Recordings/Relapse Records (AREC 01); Format: CD, vinyl	—	Recorded in 1994 during the Selfless sessions; Released in a limited fan club capacity in 2000; Received a large-scale release in 2003
Decline & Fall	Released: 2 June 2014; Label: Avalanche Recordings (AREC 032); Format: CD, cassette, vinyl, digital download	—	Godflesh's first original material since 2001's Hymns; Recorded in 2014 during the A World Lit Only by Fire sessions
"—" denotes a title that did not chart or was not released in that territory.

=== Remix albums ===
Title	Album details	Notes
Slavestate Remixes	Released: 1991; Label: Earache Records (MOSH 30TR); Format: Vinyl	Only received limited release as a 12-inch vinyl with unique artwork, but was included on most issues of Slavestate
Love and Hate in Dub	Released: 24 June 1997; Label: Earache Records (MOSH 178); Format: CD, vinyl	Remixed tracks sourced from 1996's Songs of Love and Hate; Performed live at a one-off show in 1997
A World Lit Only by Dub	Released: 6 December 2024; Label: Avalanche Recordings (AREC084); Format: Digital download, CD, vinyl	Remixed tracks sourced from 2014's A World Lit Only by Fire; Peaked at position 24 on the UK Official Record Store Chart

=== Compilation albums ===
Title	Album details	Notes
The Ten Commandments	Released: 1996; Label: Earache Records; Format: CD	Only a promotional release; Cover artwork is a still frame from the music video for "Crush My Soul"
Life Is Easy	Released: 14 August 1999; Label: Invisible Records/Alleysweeper (INV 9042); Format: CD	A compilation of Fall of Because (pre-Godflesh) demos originally released in 1986 under the title Extirpate
In All Languages	Released: 24 July 2001; Label: Earache Records (MOSH 246); Format: CD, DVD, VHS	The first disc comprises a best-of collection, the second comprises a selection of rare and otherwise unreleased tracks and an additional DVD or VHS comprises the band's music videos
New Flesh in Dub Vol 1	Released: 9 July 2021; Label: Avalanche Recordings (AREC053DUB); Format: Digital download	Consists of most Godflesh remixes released from 2010 to 2021 and two previously unreleased tracks from the Post Self sessions
Long Live the New Flesh	Released: October 2021; Label: Avalanche Recordings (AREC053); Format: Vinyl, CD	Consists of almost all Godflesh material released from 2010 to 2021 alongside two unreleased tracks from the Post Self sessions

=== Live albums ===
Title	Album details	Notes
Streetcleaner: Live at Roadburn 2011	Released: 18 May 2013; Label: Avalanche Recordings/Roadburn Festival (AREC 028); Format: CD, vinyl, digital download	Documents the band's 2011 Roadburn performance of Streetcleaner in its entirety
Godflesh – The Earache Peel Sessions	Released: 8 December 2014; Label: Earache Records (MOSH 532); Format: Vinyl, digital download	Released in part on In All Languages; Released as a part of Grind Madness at the BBC in 2009
Pure : Live	Released: 2 November 2022; Label: Avalanche Recordings (AREC062); Format: CD, digital download, Vinyl	Documents the band's 2013 Roadburn performance of Pure in its entirety

== Singles ==
Title	Year	Album	Notes
"Pulp"/"Christbait Rising"	1989	Streetcleaner	Only a 12-inch promotional release
"Slateman"	1991	Non-album single	Was included on most issues of Slavestate; Cover photograph taken during a 1991 live performance where Godflesh opened for the grunge band Nirvana
"Straight to Your Heart"	1991	Loopflesh/Fleshloop	Two-track split with the English space rock band Loop; First side features Loop covering Godflesh's "Like Rats", while the second features Godflesh covering Loop's "Straight to Your Heart" from Heaven's End (1987)
"Mothra"	1992	Pure	Only a promotional release
"Xnoybis"	1995	Selfless	Only a promotional release
"Crush My Soul"	1995	Selfless	Drew controversy for its Andres Serrano-directed music video; Peaked at position 25 on the UK Rock & Metal Singles and Albums Chart
"F.O.D. (Fuck of Death)"	2013	Non-album single	Godflesh's first material since reforming in 2010; A cover of the band Slaughter released on Decibel's flexi series
"Ringer"	2014	Decline & Fall	Released for online streaming ahead of source album
"New Dark Ages"	2014	A World Lit Only by Fire	Released for online streaming ahead of source album
"Imperator"	2014	A World Lit Only by Fire	Released for online streaming ahead of source album
"Post Self"	2017	Post Self	Released for online streaming ahead of source album
"Be God"	2017	Post Self	Released for online streaming ahead of source album
"Nero"	2023	Purge	Released physically with three in-house remixes
"Land Lord"	2023	Purge	Released for online streaming ahead of source album
"Living/Ending"	2026	Decay	Released for online streaming ahead of source album
"Master and Slave"	2026	Decay	Released for online streaming ahead of source album
