= Post Self =

Studio album by Godflesh
- Released: 17 November 2017
- Recorded: 2016–2017
- Genres: Industrial metal; post-punk
- Length: 46:38
- Label: Avalanche
- Producer: Justin Broadrick

Godflesh chronology
A World Lit Only by Fire (2014)	Post Self (2017)	Purge (2023)

Singles from Post Self
- 1. "Post Self" Released: 31 October 2017; 2. "Be God" Released: 11 November 2017

Post Self is the eighth studio album by English industrial metal band Godflesh. It was released on 17 November 2017 through frontman Justin Broadrick's own record label, Avalanche Recordings, and was the band's second album since reforming in 2010. The single "Post Self" was released for streaming on 31 October 2017, and a second track, "Be God", was released for streaming on 11 November 2017, six days in advance of the full release. Godflesh avoided interviews in the wake of Post Self, hoping to retain some of the album's purity and give listeners a chance to digest the music in a vacuum.

Musically, Post Self explores less of the metal side of Godflesh and instead focuses on the band's industrial and post-punk elements; thematically, it covers anxiety, fear, loss of self and similar topics. The album was critically acclaimed, appeared on several publications' year-end lists and peaked on Billboard's Top Heatseekers chart at 23. It was followed by various scattered tours across Europe and North America.

== Background ==
After Godflesh released their return album, A World Lit Only by Fire, in 2014, frontman Justin Broadrick formed the band Zonal (a continuation of a previous project, Techno Animal) and created a number of solo albums; under the moniker JK Flesh, Broadrick released two albums, two EPs and a series of remixes. Jesu also released two collaborative studio albums with Sun Kil Moon. During this period of activity, Broadrick and Godflesh bassist B. C. Green were simultaneously working on Post Self. In a February 2017 interview with Vice, Broadrick said the then-upcoming album, recorded from 2016 to 2017, would be "more ambient, experimental, less riff-oriented. It should be a very interesting album, the next one." It was Broadrick's plan from the beginning to approach the new music as sampled and electronic tracks rather than as typical metal compositions. In 2026, he reflected upon the conception of Post Self, saying, "I wanted to construct something utterly alien, machinelike but organic, without reliance on riffs — the polar opposite of A World Lit Only by Fire. In some ways, it’s like one big remix record."

== Composition and style ==
"A World Lit Only by Fire was a heavy riff piece, a Godflesh minimal metal record. This new album is a mood piece, offering an all-encompassing vision of Godflesh."

— Justin Broadrick on the band's direction for Post Self

Tonally, Post Self is centered more on atmosphere and noise rather than the discrete riffs of its predecessor, A World Lit Only by Fire; Joe DiVita, a writer for Loudwire, said that the music "hinges less on burly, cement-cracking grooves from the overdriven distortion of Green's bass and more on lurching low-end that provides the foundation for abrasive layers of swirling, droning notes." Multiple critics compared the album to previous Godflesh releases, most notably 1999's Us and Them for its experimentation and hip hop influence, and 1992's Pure for its sparse, desolate atmosphere. As Broadrick wrote in the album's original press release, Post Self was an exercise in mood, compiling previous experiments under the Godflesh title into a new, more coherent package. With the album's focus on generating a bleak tone, comparisons were drawn between it and one of Broadrick's other projects, Jesu. As Stephen Wyatt said in his review of the album for Under the Radar, Post Self balances the shoegaze qualities of Jesu with Godflesh's mechanical beats and thick guitar sounds.

"The Cyclic End"
"The Cyclic End's" closing passage showcases Post Self's blend of metal weight and shoegaze experimentation.

"Mortality Sorrow"
"Mortality Sorrow's" introduction highlights the industrial, hip hop, drone and experimental aspects of the album.

In the album, Broadrick's guitar takes on many different tones and styles, but rarely does he use it to create a traditional metal riff. Instead, Green's bass provides the order and much of the musical direction; this technique was also used in the group's debut album, Streetcleaner (1989), when the band employed a second guitarist to create the warbling background noises while the bass was left to guide the songs. As such, Post Self eschews many trademarks of both the heavy metal genre at large and of Godflesh's most commonly-attributed subgenre, industrial metal. The label post-punk is often applied to Post Self, and Broadrick's vocals show similarity to Jaz Coleman, singer of the influential post-punk band Killing Joke.

Structurally, Post Self's first three songs are the album's most metal-oriented. PopMatters saw the album's opening and title track as a microcosm of Post Self at large, saying that the song's structure "begins to transform, becoming more abstract as each second passes. The guitars slowly melt away, the rhythm subsides, and abstract notions appear molded through noise and feedback. This introduction presents the narrative that Post Self follows, stripping away its metal side and focusing on atmosphere, industrial structures and electronic elements to a higher degree." In keeping with that progression, Post Self expands into many experimental territories; "Mirror of Finite Light" discards the conventional metal heaviness of the first three tracks in favor of drone, "Be God" is bleak and reminiscent of doom metal, "The Cylic End" follows an unusual structure and employs spectral guitar tones, "Pre Self" and "Mortality Sorrow" showcase the abrasive industry of Godflesh and the final two tracks return to hip hop and introspective experimentation. Thematically, Post Self stems from, according to Broadrick, "loss of self" and "feeling like an alien in one's own skin", something that he has experienced throughout his life. According to the press release, "The album deals with themes of anxiety, depression, fear, mortality, and paternal/maternal relationships."

== Touring ==
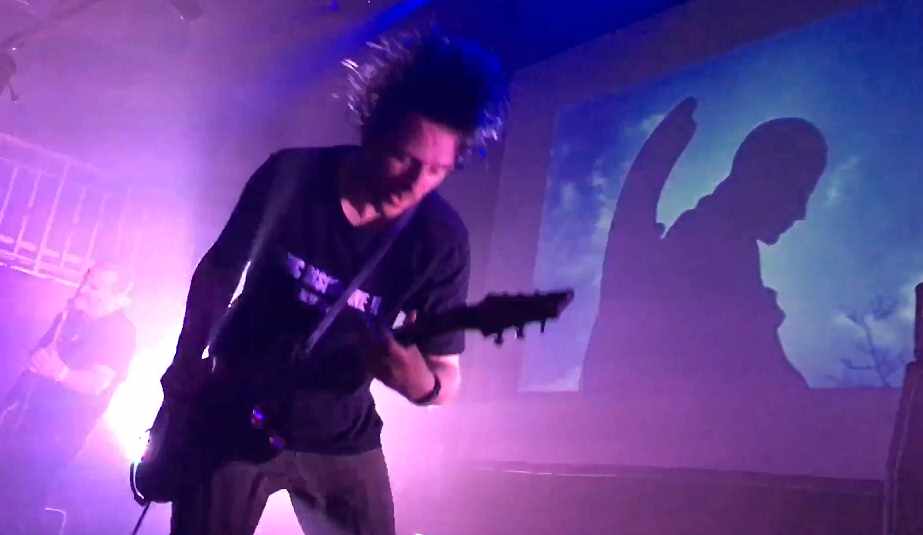
Godflesh performing in support of Post Self

A few weeks prior to the release of Post Self, Godflesh performed all of Streetcleaner at a special Hospital Productions 20th anniversary show. Despite this proximity to the album's release, the band would not go on road again until April 2018. The first concert of a loosely connected, "selective" series of Post Self shows was in Rennes, France on 12 April 2018. At that show, most of the songs had never been played before or had not been played since the 1990s; the first five tracks from Post Self were performed, as well as "Gift from Heaven" from Songs of Love and Hate (1996), the title tracks of the Merciless (1994) and Messiah (2000) EPs, "Spinebender" from the band's 1988 self-titled EP, "Head Dirt" from Streetcleaner and "Mantra" from 1994's Selfless. Outside of a 20 April 2018 performance at Roadburn Festival where most of Selfless was performed, this set list remained mostly constant through the Post Self shows. The band played nine European shows as well as Maryland Deathfest during the first half of 2018 and six North American shows in August. Godflesh then followed with a Spanish and four Scandinavian shows before heading back to North America to do a six date West Coast tour in December.

== Release ==
Upon release on 17 November 2017, Post Self was available as a black vinyl LP, a white vinyl LP limited to 1,000 copies, a CD and a digital download. The album was later released as a cassette through Hospital Productions. Supported by two singles, the title track and "Be God", Post Self placed on Billboard's Top Heatseekers chart; it was Godflesh's second album to do so after A World Lit Only by Fire. Broadrick deliberately avoided most interviews after the album's release in an attempt to help the music maintain a sense of mystique. About the choice, he said, "It did give listeners a chance to form their own opinion about what you're trying to achieve, which was something I loved about records in the late '80s, particularly post-punk albums. Having no context; coming to it completely clean. Everything is so overloaded these days. I just wanted to do the polar opposite and shroud it in mystery." All versions of Post Self feature cover art taken from the 1957 short film Angel by Joseph Cornell.

Two songs that were recorded for Post Self but weren't included on the album ("Your Nature Your Nurture" and "Gateway") were released in July 2021 as part of a compilation album titled New Flesh in Dub Vol 1.

=== Critical reception ===
Professional ratings
Aggregate scores
Source	Rating
Metacritic	84/100
Review scores
Source	Rating
AllMusic	4/5 stars
Alternative Press	4/5 stars
Blabbermouth.net	9/10
Exclaim!	9/10
Metal Hammer	3/5 stars
Metal Injection	7.5/10
MetalSucks	4/5 stars
Pitchfork	8.1/10
Stereoboard	4.5/5 stars
Under the Radar	8/10 stars

Post Self was met with critical acclaim; it received an average score of 84/100 from 8 reviews on Metacritic, indicating "universal acclaim". Initial reception of the album's two singles, "Post Self" and "Be God", was positive. Brock Thiessen of Exclaim! magazine said that the title track is "right in line with what you'd expect from Godflesh, and that's definitely not a bad thing." Regarding "Be God", MetalSucks co-founder Axl Rosenberg said, "You can't tell if everything is getting bigger or just closer, and the fact that you can't tell only adds to your sense of panic, your total loss of control."

Reception to the album proper was highly positive. AllMusic reviewer Paul Simpson said, "Post Self is more moody than direct, and isn't the most hard-hitting, immediate album in the Godflesh catalog, but for anyone who equally appreciates Broadrick's metal and electronic sides, the album is as stunning as one would expect." Denise Falzon of Exclaim! wrote that Post Self is "a masterful release from two musicians who seem to be incapable of creating anything short of exquisite." Jason Pettigrew of Alternative Press appreciated the sonic variety of the album and highlighted its "chilling" atmosphere. Writing for Pitchfork, Zoe Camp said, "brisk, 47-minute runtime aside, Post Self is a daunting listen, as well as an essential one, even by Godflesh's sterling standards." The PopMatters review for Post Self was highly positive, praising how the album remains true to Godflesh's sound while still breaking new ground. Similarly, Resident Advisor writer Andrew Ryce highlighted the album's ability to simultaneously reference old Godflesh material while still innovating. Juan Edgardo Rodríguez of No Ripcord wrote, "Simply put, Post Self is another stunning addition to Godflesh's uncompromising thirty-year run"; Metal Hammer's Tom O'Boyle, on the other hand, wrote a more lukewarm review of the album, criticising its spare minimalism and lack of innovation. Jami Morgan of the band Code Orange suggested that Post Self was Godflesh's best album.

=== Accolades ===
After its release, Post Self appeared on several year-end lists. On The Quietus' 2017 Albums of the Year breakdown, Patrick Clarke positively noted how the album was a more refined, "spartan" approach to nihilistic music than previous Godflesh records, and decided that the gloom of it all was "even more sickeningly intense for it". The same publication put Post Self at position 9 on their Best Metal Albums of 2017 list, praising the album's subtlety and writing that it is "extraordinary that, almost 30 years after the release of their first EP, Godflesh are still releasing utterly vital records that continue to reshape and reimagine their sound". For both Revolver's and Rolling Stone's year-end summaries, Dan Epstein and Kory Grow respectively appreciated how the bleak, "dystopian" soundscapes of Post Self managed as much impact as the band's earlier, heavier material.

Year	Publication	Country	Accolade	Rank	Ref.
2017	The Quietus	United Kingdom	"Albums of the Year 2017"	59	
2017	The Quietus	United Kingdom	"The Best Metal Albums of 2017"	9	
2017	Revolver	United States	"20 Best Albums of 2017"	6	
2017	Rolling Stone	United States	"20 Best Metal Albums of 2017"	10	

== Track listing ==
All tracks are written by Justin Broadrick and B. C. Green.

No.	Title	Length
1.	"Post Self"	4:28
2.	"Parasite"	3:40
3.	"No Body"	3:49
4.	"Mirror of Finite Light"	4:23
5.	"Be God"	5:09
6.	"The Cyclic End"	4:51
7.	"Pre Self"	5:08
8.	"Mortality Sorrow"	4:46
9.	"In Your Shadow"	5:08
10.	"The Infinite End"	5:16
Total length:		46:38

Bandcamp and Japanese edition bonus tracks
No.	Title	Length
11.	"Parasite" (Alternate Version)	4:09
12.	"The Cyclic End" (Dub)	7:08
13.	"In Your Shadow" (JK Flesh Reshape)	6:08
Total length:		64:03

Notes

- On some early releases of Post Self, track 2, "Parasite", and track 3, "No Body", switch positions.

== Personnel ==
Credits adapted from Post Self liner notes

- Justin Broadrick – guitars, vocals, production, machines
- B. C. Green – bass

== Charts ==
Chart (2017)	Peak position
US Billboard Heatseekers	23
