= Messiah (EP) =

2000 EP by Godflesh

EP by Godflesh
- Released: 5 December 2000 (limited run); 1 April 2003 (full release)
- Recorded: 1994–1995
- Genre: Industrial metal
- Length: 22:42 (original EP); 50:49 (public releases)
- Label: Avalanche; Relapse
- Producer: J. K. Broadrick; G. C. Green

Godflesh chronology
Hymns (2001)	Messiah (00000000)	Streetcleaner: Live at Roadburn 2011 (2013)

Original fan club cover
- Released in 2000

Messiah is the fifth EP by English industrial metal band Godflesh. The EP was originally recorded and mixed during 1994, and was released independently to members of the band's fan club on 5 December 2000 along with four remixes, which were created in 1995. After Justin Broadrick disbanded Godflesh, he reissued the material through Relapse Records on 1 April 2003.

== Background ==
Messiah was recorded at the same time as Godflesh's 1994 studio album, Selfless, but only saw limited release until being reassembled and repackaged in 2003 after the band's dissolution. Regarding the EP, Broadrick said:

Basically, Messiah was something we recorded in, like, 1994. We recorded it around the time we did the album Selfless. And when we did Selfless—which was on Columbia in America—we did so much stuff at that time, so we had a glut of material and we wanted to be somewhat focused about it. We had this EP that we recorded at the same time, which was Messiah, and we just sat on the EP because Columbia wanted to do so much with the tracks on Selfless that we couldn’t really focus on this EP. And they seemed not to really understand the context anyway, for one reason or another.

Upon reviewing the shelved EP after touring in 1994, Broadrick and Green proved dissatisfied with the package. While going through the mixing process again in 1995 for the eventual 2000 fan club limited run, the development of the next studio album, Songs of Love and Hate (1996), took precedence, and Messiah was again sidelined. After Godflesh disbanded in 2002, Broadrick was asked by Relapse Records founder Matthew Jacobson, an apparent fan, to fully release the EP, which had become a sort of legendary collector's item. Wanting to refine and perfect the package, Broadrick agreed and the EP saw full physical and digital distribution in 2003.

== Music and composition ==
"Sungod"
"Sungod" showcases the EP's focus on bass and hip hop beats

Musically, Messiah is more experimental than most Godflesh releases. Hip hop beats are more common than industrial ones, and uncommon instruments, like a sitar, are employed. Jon Wiederhorn of Bandcamp called the EP a "hybrid of knock-out punch and dreamy-eyed dissonance." Broadrick's vocals are unusually melodic on some tracks, and heavy metal guitar is largely absent from the EP, with the focus instead placed on Green's distorted bass. Much like Godflesh's 1997 remix album Love and Hate in Dub and 1999 studio album Us and Them, Messiah incorporates drum and bass and dub aspects. About the EP's content, Broadrick said it "was mainly focused around the 'Messiah' track itself—that is really the most important thing. Not to discount the other tracks at all, but that, we felt, was a really focused track—we actually feel it’s one of the best Godflesh tracks out there, really."

== Release ==
The original fan club version of Messiah was released on 5 December 2000 through Broadrick's own label, Avalanche Recordings, and was limited to 1,000 copies with different artwork than the final EP. This was the first release from Avalanche. On 1 April 2003, Messiah was distributed as a CD by Relapse Records, and on 5 February 2008, the EP was released as three 2xLP vinyl editions (one with unique artwork, one with clear records, one with white records, and all limited to 1,000 copies each).

=== Critical reception ===
Professional ratings
Review scores
Source	Rating
Allmusic	4/5 stars

Due to the convoluted and often limited nature of Messiah's releases, few publications reviewed the EP. Eduardo Rivadavia of AllMusic said that Messiah features "four intensely pulverizing cuts" that "easily qualify as vintage Godflesh." Chris Ayers of Exclaim! wrote, "ultimately, Messiah offers an unadulterated peek into Broadrick's mind before those albums were even ideas," speaking of Love and Hate in Dub and Us and Them. Paul Sinclair of The Skinny described the EP's title track as a "cult classic".

== Track listing ==
All songs written by Justin Broadrick and G.C. Green.

Original 1994 EP
No.	Title	Length
1.	"Messiah"	6:29
2.	"Wilderness of Mirrors"	5:56
3.	"Sungod"	6:23
4.	"Scapegoat"	3:54
Total length:		22:42

2000/2003 bonus tracks
No.	Title	Length
5.	"Messiah" (Dub)	6:35
6.	"Wilderness of Mirrors" (Dub)	6:08
7.	"Sungod" (Dub)	6:28
8.	"Scapegoat" (Dub)	8:53
Total length:		50:49

Note

- Even though the first, unreleased version of Messiah was limited to the four original tracks, no version of the EP saw distribution without the four dub mixes.

== Personnel ==
Godflesh

- G. C. Green – bass
- J. K. Broadrick – guitar, vocals
- Machines – rhythm, samples, synth

Technical personnel

- Scott Hull – mastering
- Paul A. Romano – photography
- James K. Weber – photography
- Timothy Leo – LP design
