= A World Lit Only by Dub =

Remix album by Godflesh
- Released: 6 December 2024
- Recorded: 2013–2024
- Genre: Industrial metal
- Length: 46:35
- Label: Avalanche
- Producer: Justin Broadrick

Godflesh chronology
Purge (2023)	A World Lit Only by Dub (2024)	Decay (2026)

Professional ratings
Review scores
Source	Rating
Decibel	Positive
Kerrang!	4/5
Thrashocore	8.5/10

A World Lit Only by Dub is the second remix album by English industrial metal band Godflesh, released on 6 December 2024 through frontman Justin Broadrick's label Avalanche Recordings. It features remixed dub versions of tracks from the band's seventh studio album, A World Lit Only by Fire (2014), created by Godflesh. Broadrick described the remix album as a way to celebrate A World Lit Only by Fire ten years after its original release.

== Background ==
After reforming in 2009, Godflesh released the 2014 EP Decline & Fall and the 2014 studio album A World Lit Only by Fire, both of which saw Japanese versions with bonus dub remixes. This combined with a history of in-house remixing (for example, 1997's Love and Hate in Dub) led to interviewers asking frontman Justin Broadrick if A World Lit Only by Fire would receive a fuller remix treatment. Broadrick first spoke publicly about A World Lit Only by Dub as early as 14 October 2014, a week after A World Lit Only by Fire's release and a decade before the remix album's release. He stated that the original intent of A World Lit Only by Dub was to explore the post-punk side of Godflesh's sound, and he planned to employ former Godflesh drummer Ted Parsons to provide live drumming. However, Parsons does not appear on the final release.

Broadrick characterized the five remixes on A World Lit Only by Dub as "extended mutated versions; exploring and pushing the inherently experimental nature of Godflesh, now finalised and somewhat re-contextualised 10 years later." Reviewers emphasised how "calling [the songs] remixes feels like something of a slight disservice" given how altered they are, featuring numerous new and rerecorded parts, entirely new structures and titles more reminiscent of new songs than remixes.

== Track listing ==
All songs written by Justin Broadrick.

No.	Title	Length
1.	"Cursed by You All"	9:07
2.	"Dead Ending"	10:10
3.	"Life Given Life Taken"	9:23
4.	"Our Fathers in Heaven"	9:11
5.	"Towers"	8:44
Total length:		46:35

== Personnel ==
Credits adapted from A World Lit Only by Dub liner notes.

- Justin Broadrick – guitars, vocals, machines, production
- Ben Green – bass
