= Streetcleaner: Live at Roadburn 2011 =

2013 live album by Godflesh

Live album by Godflesh
- Released: 18 May 2013 (limited vinyl); 4 April 2017 (digital); 1 November 2017 (limited CD)
- Recorded: 14 April 2011; Tilburg, Netherlands
- Genre: Industrial metal
- Length: 66:06 (vinyl release); 72:38 (digital and CD release)
- Label: Avalanche Recordings
- Producer: Justin Broadrick

Godflesh chronology
Messiah (2003)	Streetcleaner: Live at Roadburn 2011 (00000001)	Decline & Fall (2014)

Poster of the event

Streetcleaner: Live at Roadburn 2011 is the first live album by English industrial metal band Godflesh. The release (which consists of the entirety of Godflesh's 1989 studio album Streetcleaner performed live) was recorded on 14 April 2011 at the Roadburn Festival in Tilburg, Netherlands. Apart from being the group's debut live album, it was also the first time they played Streetcleaner in its entirety.

This performance marks the first of three times Godflesh played an entire album live at Roadburn. In 2013, the band performed their 1992 album Pure, and in 2018 the band performed their 1994 album Selfless.

== The performance ==
Godflesh frontman Justin Broadrick believed that this performance was "the most coherent version of Streetcleaner ever played." The Quietus writer Jamie Thomson said this about the performance: "As [Godflesh] pummeled their way through a complete performance of Streetcleaner in the main theatre, the jackhammer drum machine and guitar crunch invoked more of a physical rather than emotional response – that response being: 'Ouch'." Thomson later wrote "Rather than being dwarfed by the occasion, the image of Justin Broadrick and G. C. Green stood alone on the giant stage reflected perfectly their stark, tormented sound."

While many of the original Streetcleaner tracks were recorded with the aid of a second guitarist, Paul Neville, Godflesh remained a duo for the 2011 performance at Roadburn. In a mixed review of the performance, Ezekiel Rodofili with Cooltry highlighted this discrepancy, writing that the synth employed to replace Neville "wasn't quite up to the task." Regardless, Rodofili went on to praise the way Broadrick and Green played, especially focusing on the importance of Green's bass, and summarizing by saying "Streetcleaner: Live at Roadburn 2011 is decent, if a little uneven." Vince Bellino of Decibel was more positive, saying that Streetcleaner is brought to life in a way different from the studio recordings and writing, "The songs are more dissonant and, at times, cacophonous, a powerful incarnation of the record more than 20 years after its release."

== Release ==
Streetcleaner: Live at Roadburn 2011 was initially released as a limited vinyl pressing on 18 April 2013, available in black with 400 copies and in red with 100 copies. This version of the release divides the tracks "Devastator" and Mighty Trust Krusher", whereas the following releases combine them. The album only saw full digital distribution on 4 April 2017. On 1 November 2017, the album was released on CD in digipak format and was limited to 1,000 copies. Both the digital and CD versions run six minutes longer than the original vinyl release.

== Track listing ==
No.	Title	Length
1.	"Like Rats"	5:34
2.	"Christbait Rising"	7:46
3.	"Pulp"	4:21
4.	"Dream Long Dead"	5:36
5.	"Head Dirt"	4:20
6.	"Devastator / Mighty Trust Krusher"	9:40
7.	"Life Is Easy"	4:25
8.	"Streetcleaner"	6:47
9.	"Locust Furnace"	4:36
10.	"Tiny Tears"	3:21
11.	"Wound"	3:12
12.	"Deadhead"	4:06
13.	"Suction"	8:48
Total length:		72:38

Vinyl LP track listing (side A)
No.	Title	Length
1.	"Like Rats"	4:27
2.	"Christbait Rising"	6:59
3.	"Pulp"	4:16

Vinyl LP track listing (side B)
No.	Title	Length
1.	"Dream Long Dead"	5:17
2.	"Head Dirt"	6:08
3.	"Devastator"	3:21
4.	"Mighty Trust Krusher"	5:26

Vinyl LP track listing (side C)
No.	Title	Length
1.	"Life Is Easy"	4:48
2.	"Streetcleaner"	6:42
3.	"Locust Furnace"	4:44

Vinyl LP track listing (side D, Tiny Tears)
No.	Title	Length
1.	"Tiny Tears"	3:23
2.	"Wound"	3:06
3.	"Dead Head"	4:07
4.	"Suction"	3:22
Total length:		66:06

Note

- The album features different track times and track divisions for its vinyl release.

== Personnel ==
Godflesh

- Justin Broadrick – guitar, voice
- G. C. Green – bass
- Machines – machines

Additional personnel

- Maurice de Jong – sleeve art
- James Plotkin – CD mastering
