= F.O.D. (Fuck of Death) =

1987 song by Slaughter

Song by Slaughter

from the album Strappado
- Released: 1987
- Recorded: February 9, 1986; Future Sound, Toronto, Canada
- Length: 3:54
- Label: Diabolic Force, Fringe
- Songwriters: Dave Hewson, Terry Sadler, Ron Sumners
- Producer: Brian Tailor

"F.O.D. (Fuck of Death)" is a song by Canadian extreme metal band Slaughter. Written by bandmembers Dave Hewson, Terry Sadler and Ron Sumners and produced by Brian Tailor, the song was included in the band's 1987 debut album, Strappado, released in 1987 via Diabolic Force and Fringe Records.

The song bears the same title as the band's 2004 live album, Fuck of Death.

== Personnel ==
=== Slaughter ===
- Dave Hewson – lead vocals, guitar, lyrics
- Terry Sadler – bass, vocals, arrangement
- Ron Sumners – drums, percussion, arrangement

=== Technical personnel ===
- Brian Tailor – production
- Ted Kent – engineering
- Mike Busija – mixing

== Godflesh cover ==
"F.O.D. (Fuck of Death)"

Single by Godflesh
- Released: September 3, 2013
- Recorded: July 2013, Avalanche Studios
- Length: 4:01
- Label: Decibel Flexi Series
- Songwriters: Dave Hewson, Terry Sadler, Ron Sumners
- Producers: Justin Broadrick, Godflesh

Godflesh singles chronology
"Crush My Soul" (1995)	"F.O.D. (Fuck of Death)" (2013)	"Ringer" (2014)

Audio sample
- file; help

"F.O.D. (Fuck of Death)" was covered by English industrial metal band Godflesh, after its reunion in 2010. It was released as a limited edition flexi disc promotional single on November 3, 2013, as a part of Decibel Magazine's Flexi Series. The release was the band's first new material in 12 years, since Hymns (2001). The song was also released on SoundCloud for streaming.

Many copies of the flexi disc were accidentally destroyed by the printer during the insertion process. Subsequently, all of the subscribers of the magazine were mailed a new copy of the disc.

=== Background ===
On the band's decision to cover the song, Justin Broadrick spoke in a MetalSucks interview:

"It's a song both Ben and I have loved for years and years, ever since that album came out. What I loved about Slaughter at the time was their Celtic Frost worship. I loved Celtic Frost, and most who have taken their influence; for example, I also love Obituary! But we always thought 'F.O.D' was SO Godflesh in some weird sort of way. It's brutal and minimal without any showy display."

=== Critical reception ===
Gregory Adams of Exclaim! described the cover as "plenty grimy, with detuned six-strings unfurling layer upon layer of ooze onto the arrangement." He also commented, "The drum machine beat crawls along at an unnatural pace, up until the double kick comes in, while gargled vocals figure prominently throughout as well." Kez Whelan of Terrorizer also described it as a "crushing cover", while stating that the song was "performed here in that trademark Godflesh style, complete with merciless drum machine pounding, G.C. Green's churning bass lines and Justin Broadrick's unbelivably [sic] heavy guitar tone."

=== Track listing ===
==== Side A ====
1. "F.O.D. (Fuck of Death)" – 4:01

=== Personnel ===
- Justin Broadrick – vocals, guitar, production
- G. C. Green – bass
- Machines – drums
