= Decay (Godflesh album) =

Studio album by Godflesh
- Released: 25 September 2026
- Recorded: 2020–2025
- Studio: Avalanche Studios
- Genre: Industrial metal
- Length: 41:51
- Label: Relapse
- Producer: Justin Broadrick

Godflesh chronology
A World Lit Only by Dub (2025)	Decay (2026)	The End (2027)

Singles from Decay
- 1. "Living/Ending" Released: 12 August 2026; 2. "Master and Slave" Released: 15 September 2026

Decay is the tenth studio album by English industrial metal band Godflesh, released on 25 September 2026. Originally announced in March 2026 as part of a press release on the end of Godflesh, Decay will be the band's penultimate studio album due to frontman Justin Broadrick's inguinal hernia and subsequent abdominal surgery. It is composed of songs culled and expanded from the sessions of the band's previous album, Purge (2023), and was originally intended for release in 2024; however, it took Broadrick two years to find a suitable label in Relapse Records. Godflesh released the album's first single, "Living/Ending," on 12 August 2026, and the second, "Master and Slave," on 15 September 2026. Critics describe the former track as a "lurching, guttural groove" and compare it to the band's debut album, Streetcleaner (1989). Decay, recorded mostly on a seven-string guitar, is noted to be more instrumental than the band's earlier albums, with Broadrick uttering "less than 150 words total in just 42 minutes." Thematically, Decay explores Broadrick's exhaustion with human interaction and autistic masking.

== Composition and style ==
Decay consists of six tracks, the first and last of which comprise nearly half of the album's 42-minute runtime. These two bookending songs, "Master and Slave" and "Consume Me," serve as what frontman Justin Broadrick and some critics consider the most conceptually and sonically definitive pieces of the album. The four central tracks all last between five and six minutes. Though the songs on Decay come from the same sessions as those of the band's previous album, Purge (2023), several critics note differences between the two releases; Kory Grow of Rolling Stone describes Decay as more experimental, sophisticated, and emotional than Purge, and Will Yarbrough of PopMatters calls Decay the "evil twin" of Purge. Along with being generally bleaker and more experimental than its sister album, Decay is more laconic, containing fewer than 150 words of lyrics, some of which are difficult to hear and few of which fit the aggressive vocal style for which Broadrick is often known. This is due in part to a hernia with which Broadrick was struggling during the final stages of recording the album. Of this experience, Broadrick says, "normally Godflesh is me expressing existential and psychological pain, but here, physical pain had made its way into the sound." This hernia and subsequent abdominal surgery resulted in the end of Godflesh as a touring act and in the end of Broadrick's shouted, growling vocal style, the final examples of which appear on Decay, most notably in the lead single "Living/Ending" and closing track "Consume Me."

== Critical reception ==
Professional ratings
Aggregate scores
Source	Rating
Metacritic	83/100
Review scores
Source	Rating
AllMusic	4/5 stars
Distorted Sound Magazine	8/10
Ghost Cult Magazine	9/10
Noizze	10/10
Pitchfork	7.8/10
PopMatters	7/10
The Quietus	Positive
Rolling Stone	4/5 stars
Sputnikmusic	4/5
Stereoboard	5/5 stars

Decay received very positive reviews from critics. Metacritic scored the album 83/100 based on seven reviews, indicating "universal acclaim".

=== Accolades ===
Year	Publication	Country	Accolade	Rank	Ref.
2026	Decibel	United States	"Top 40 Albums of 2026"	16	

== Track listing ==
All music and lyrics written by Justin Broadrick

No.	Title	Length
1.	"Master and Slave"	8:46
2.	"Living/Ending"	5:07
3.	"Feral Colony"	5:02
4.	"Fear of Man"	5:23
5.	"Fodder"	5:55
6.	"Consume Me"	11:38
Total length:		41:51

== Personnel ==
Credits adapted from physical liner notes

Godflesh

- Justin Broadrick – guitars, vocals, machines, production, creative direction
- Ben Green – bass

Additional personnel

- Jacob Speis – design

== Charts ==
Chart performance for Decay
Chart (2026)	Peak position
French Physical Albums (SNEP)	200
French Rock & Metal Albums (SNEP)	77
Scottish Albums (Official Charts)	37
UK Albums Sales (Official Charts)	62
UK Independent Albums (Official Charts)	30
UK Rock & Metal Albums (Official Charts)	9
US Top Album Sales (Billboard)	38
