= Post Self (song) =

2017 song by Godflesh

Single by Godflesh

from the album Post Self
- Released: 31 October 2017
- Recorded: 2017
- Studio: Justin Broadrick's home studio in Wales
- Genre: Industrial metal; post-punk
- Length: 4:28
- Label: Avalanche
- Songwriter: Justin Broadrick
- Producer: Justin Broadrick

Godflesh singles chronology
"Ringer" (2014)	"Post Self" (2017)	"Nero" (2023)

Audio sample
- file; help

"Post Self" is a song by English industrial metal band Godflesh, taken from their 2017 album of the same name. It was released ahead of Post Self on 31 October 2017 through frontman Justin Broadrick's own label, Avalanche Recordings, as a digital download.

== Composition ==
"Post Self", the introductory and title track of Godflesh's eighth studio album, is one of only a few songs on the release to feature a traditional metal riff. Structurally, "Post Self" can be seen as a microcosm of its host album; just as Post Self begins with three metal-oriented tracks, "Post Self" the song's first half is dominated by aggressive guitar and guttural vocals, and just as Post Self becomes more somber and experimental in its latter stages, so too does the song. Peter Helman of Stereogum described the song as "crushing", and Zoe Camp of Revolver called it "relentless". Noisey's Phil Witmer highlighted the song's distortion, hip hop-inspired percussion, screaming, low-tuned guitar and overall grinding sound as "a great primer" for the band. Some critics labeled the song as post-punk.

== Critical reception ==
"Post Self" was well-received by critics. AllMusic writer Paul Simpson called the main riff "instantly striking." Vince Neilstein, cofounder of MetalSucks magazine, said that "Despite the press copy's claim that Post Self will be 'less metal,' this track still goes really fucking hard." Denise Falzon of Exclaim! wrote that "Post Self" "contain[s] those instantly recognizable pulsating beats and crushing sludgy heaviness, while Broadrick's distinct vocals are as powerful as ever." Also writing for Exclaim!, Brock Thiessen praised the song, saying, "[it] is a crushing sonic assault, loading on thick, damaged layers of industrial-minded sludge. It's right in line with what you'd expect from Godflesh, and that's definitely not a bad thing."

== Track listing ==
No.	Title	Length
1.	"Post Self"	4:28

== Personnel ==
Credits adapted from "Post Self" liner notes

- Justin Broadrick – vocals, guitar, production, rhythm programming
- B. C. Green – bass guitar
