= Hymns (Godflesh album) =

Studio album by Godflesh
- Released: 23 October 2001
- Recorded: June 2001
- Studio: Foel Studio, Llanfair Caereinion, Wales
- Genre: Industrial metal
- Length: 74:00
- Label: Music for Nations; Koch
- Producer: J. K. Broadrick; G. C. Green

Godflesh chronology
In All Languages (2001)	Hymns (2001)	Messiah (2003)

Hymns is the sixth studio album by English industrial metal band Godflesh. It was released on 23 October 2001 through Music for Nations and was the band's final album before breaking up in 2002. In 2010, Godflesh reformed and in 2014 released their comeback album A World Lit Only by Fire. Hymns had a troubled production and was intended to be distinct departure from Godflesh's intensely regimented industrial sound to something more traditionally hard rock. It was the band's second and final album to feature a live drummer rather than a drum machine.

== Background and composition ==
"This turned out to be a really long record for us. We put everything on this record that we had recorded ... We racked our brains on what should go and what needed to stay and it was just so hard to decide so we kept it all on. In this end, we said "fuck it!" We did eventually cut just one song, but that was more of an experimental song with beats that sounded like something from Us and Them. I didn't want anything like that on the record 'cause I absolutely fucking hated that album."

— Justin Broadrick on the album's content.

Following the under-promoted release of Us and Them (1999), Godflesh left Earache Records and was without their support for the first time since the band's self-titled debut EP in 1988. Despite already having some Hymns demos completed, Godflesh had difficulty finding a new label. After being repeatedly turned away, they eventually settled on Music for Nations, a "mainstream" label where frontman Justin Broadrick felt out of place.

Hymns was the first Godflesh album with Ted Parsons on drums, who Broadrick called the band's "driving force" and inspiration to continue, and was the group's second album (after 1996's Songs of Love and Hate) to feature a non-mechanical drummer. It was also the band's first album since 1989's Streetcleaner to be recorded in a professional studio. Parsons later revealed that the band recorded in the studio due to label pressure and described the decision as "a mistake". Broadrick said he found studio jamming refreshing but simultaneously depressing. He called the comparatively traditional recording process "primitive."

"Deaf, Dumb & Blind"
Showcases the album's hard rock sound and employment of conventional metal drumming

"Deaf, Dumb & Blind" (Demo 2012 Remaster)
Corresponding clip from the song's demo, preferred by Broadrick

Despite Broadrick preferring the album's original demos to the final products, the 13-track, 74-minute album was released on 23 October 2001. Broadrick stated that Hymns was a reaction to the previous album because he "lost sight of what Godflesh should be". In contrast, he described Hymns as "a new beginning" that was intended to counter the "watered down" rock associated with the popular nu metal genre. Musically, Hymns is a more conventional take on heavy metal than Godflesh had ever done before, which was a deliberate choice, according to Broadrick. Fact described it as "a strikingly spartan record, boiling the band to its bare bones and adding a little more light into the mix", and Gary Suarez of Consequence of Sound said, "Hymns is as pure a hard rock record as Godflesh ever made." While Godflesh's sound is often described as minimal, the album was particularly highlighted as a turn to the simplicity of the classic "guitar, bass, human drummer lineup".

The final song on the album, "Jesu", became the name of Broadrick's next project after he dissolved Godflesh on 10 April 2002.

== Live performances ==
Two weeks before Godflesh was set to tour in support of Hymns, G. C. Green, bass player and cofounding member, left the band to focus on his personal life. Broadrick, devastated by the departure, focused his efforts on finding a replacement. Killing Joke bassist Paul Raven ultimately filled the void, and he, Broadrick and Parsons played a handful of shows. In these concerts, "Requiem", a cover of the introductory track from Killing Joke's self-titled debut album, was performed. At one of those performances, Killing Joke singer Jaz Coleman joined Godflesh on stage. After those shows, a tour of North America alongside High on Fire and Isis was planned, but ultimately fell through when Broadrick experienced a nervous breakdown. The Hymns era proved to be tumultuous, resulting in few concerts played and the end of Godflesh.

After the band reformed in 2010 and began to play shows again, the set lists were focused on early Godflesh material that Broadrick considered best. As such, no songs from Hymns were performed live, though Green suggested they rework and play "Defeated" and Broadrick was interested in playing "Jesu".

== Release ==
Hymns was released on 23 October 2001 through Music for Nations. A remastered version of Hymns containing bonus tracks was released on 19 February 2013. Unlike most remasters, Broadrick's goal was to make the album closer to its original demos. Regarding the final sound of the original Hymns release, Parsons said, "We were produced by this kind of typical metal producer. He had done a lot of Fear Factory, and bands like that, and you know, he kinda watered it down a little bit." Included among the bonus tracks is the non-album song "If I Could Only Be What You Want", which was recorded during the Hymns session and was previously available on the Loud Music for Loud People compilation.

=== Reception ===
Professional ratings
Review scores
Source	Rating
AllMusic	4/5 stars
Exclaim!	Favourable
Metal Hammer	8/10
Rock Sound	4/5 stars
The Wire	Favourable

AllMusic reviewer Jim Harper wrote, "If you can't stand Godflesh and their minimalist approach, then Hymns is unlikely to change your mind, but, for the already converted, this is the best album the band have released in recent years." In 2001, Chris Ayers of Exclaim! wrote that Hymns was Godflesh's "most ambitious album yet". Blabbermouth.net said that Hymns is "often called [Godflesh's] finest album". Iain Currie with Bring the Noise described Hymns as "brilliant" and contextualized the album as "a reminder of how bands of real calibre reacted to that nonsensical period ... when nu-metal was picking up its destructive and soul destroying pace". In a retrospective review of the album, Treblezine writer Jeff Terich said, "Hymns sounds more relevant than ever, having perfected the art of the beautiful slaughter." In a 2015 interview, Parsons reflected on the reception of Hymns, saying "It got good reviews and it got really bad reviews. But I liked the album. I thought it was good."

=== Accolades ===
Year	Publication	Country	Accolade	Rank	Ref.
2001	Terrorizer	United Kingdom	"Albums of the Year"	13	
2001	Rock Sound	United Kingdom	"Critics' Poll 2001"	32	
2010	Decibel	United States	"The Top 100 Greatest Metal Albums of the Decade"	91	

== Track listing ==
No.	Title	Length
1.	"Defeated"	6:07
2.	"Deaf, Dumb & Blind"	4:26
3.	"Paralyzed"	5:10
4.	"Anthem"	5:27
5.	"Voidhead"	4:43
6.	"Tyrant"	4:07
7.	"White Flag"	6:27
8.	"For Life"	5:13
9.	"Animals"	3:54
10.	"Vampires"	6:30
11.	"Antihuman"	4:25
12.	"Regal"	4:40
13.	"Jesu" (ends at 6:03 and is followed by a minute of silence before an untitled track begins at 7:03)	12:51
Total length:		74:00

2013 reissue bonus tracks
No.	Title	Length
1.	"Voidhead" (Demo 2012 Mix)	4:51
2.	"Vampires" (Demo 2012 Mix)	6:10
3.	"Deaf, Dumb & Blind" (Demo 2012 Remaster)	4:37
4.	"Anthem" (Demo 2012 Remaster)	5:21
5.	"Paralyzed" (Demo 2012 Remaster)	5:10
6.	"For Life" (Demo 2012 Remaster)	5:11
7.	"If I Could Only Be What You Want" (2012 Remaster)	5:04
Total length:		36:24

== Personnel ==
Credits for Hymns adapted from 2013 reissue liner notes

Godflesh

- Justin Broadrick – vocals, guitar, programming, remastering
- G. C. Green – bass
- Ted Parsons – drums, percussion

Additional personnel

- Diarmuid Dalton – moog, shortwave on "Jesu"
- Colin Richardson – engineering
- Dave Anderson – engineering
- Mark Warden – engineering
