= Xnoybis =

Song by Godflesh

Single by Godflesh

from the album Selfless
- Released: 1995
- Recorded: 1994
- Studio: Avalanche Studios, Birmingham UK
- Genre: Industrial metal
- Length: 35:08
- Label: Earache, Columbia
- Songwriter(s): Justin Broadrick
- Producer(s): Justin Broadrick; G. C. Green

Godflesh singles chronology
"Mothra" (1992)	"Xnoybis" (1995)	"Crush My Soul" (1995)

"Xnoybis" (pronounced: znoi-bus) is a song by English industrial metal band Godflesh, taken from the album Selfless (1994). It was released in 1995 through Earache Records as a CD, and was also distributed as a promotional to radio stations.

== The song ==
Godflesh frontman Justin Broadrick explained that "Xnoybis" is a song about spiritual transcendence, and that much of the rest of the album carries that theme. Musically, the song features a pummeling drum machine loop and a simple, harmonics-based guitar riff that repeats throughout. Uncharacteristically for Godflesh, the song also has piano in it. "Xnoybis" was one of AllMusic critic Ned Raggett's favourite songs off of Selfless.

While the psychofuckdub of "Xnoybis" also appears on the "Crush My Soul" single, and the original version appears on the album Selfless, the clubdub and edit versions are unique to this release. In 1994, Broadrick called the eighteen-minute psychofuckdub remix "the most experimental thing Godflesh has ever done".

== Track listing ==
No.	Title	Length
1.	"Xnoybis" (Edit)	4:24
2.	"Xnoybis" (Clubdub)	7:24
3.	"Xnoybis" (Psychofuckdub)	17:25
4.	"Xnoybis"	5:54
Total length:		35:08

== Personnel ==
Godflesh

- G.C. Green – bass guitar, production
- J.K. Broadrick – guitar, vocals, production
- Machines – rhythm, samples

Additional personnel

- Bob Ludwig – mastering
- Jim Welch – editing (1)
- Vlado Meller – editing (1)
