= Selfless (album) =

Studio album by Godflesh
- Released: 26 September 1994 (Europe); 18 October 1994 (US)
- Recorded: January–May 1994
- Studio: Avalanche
- Genre: Industrial metal
- Length: 78:12
- Labels: Earache; Columbia (US)
- Producers: J. K. Broadrick; G. C. Green

Godflesh chronology
Merciless (1994)	Selfless (1994)	Songs of Love and Hate (1996)

Singles from Selfless
- 1. "Crush My Soul" Released: 1995; 2. "Xnoybis" Released: 1995

Selfless is the third studio album by English industrial metal band Godflesh. It was released in Europe on 26 September 1994 by Earache Records and in the United States on 18 October 1994 by Columbia Records. Being the band's major-label debut, the record features a more conventional and rock-oriented sound compared to Godflesh's previous releases. It spawned two singles, "Xnoybis" and "Crush My Soul". The music video for the latter was directed by photographer Andres Serrano.

At the 2018 Roadburn Festival, Selfless was performed live in its near entirety for the first time. "Go Spread Your Wings", the album's 23-minute closing track, was substituted with "Messiah" and "Merciless", two songs recorded in the same sessions as Selfless.

== Background and composition ==
"Bigot"
"Bigot" showcases the album's traditional heavy metal riffs.

Since Selfless and its preceding EP Merciless (1994) saw Godflesh with a major record label, the band was assigned a professional to do final mastering. Bob Ludwig was called in to enhance the pre-existing masters. Godflesh frontman Justin Broadrick spoke positively on this experience, saying that Ludwig's changes were improvements. The album reportedly takes its name from the John Coltrane record, Selflessness: Featuring My Favorite Things (1969), and the cover is a photograph of human nerve cells growing on a microchip.

Broadrick described Selfless as his "rock & roll" album. Nevertheless, on the record's sound, AllMusic's Ned Raggett states: "The rough, clipped, lock and load style of the band remained essentially unchanged at heart -- Broadrick's brawling, echoed vocals, the sheer impact of the guitars and drum machine beats, Green's uneasy bass. Still, some of the singing is Broadrick's most conventional, some of the riffing almost epically classic rock, and the technical/digital pulse at the heart of the band sufficiently straightforward enough not to annoy those who can't stand the idea of a non-human drummer." According to The Quietus, the album "returned to the super-dense riffery of their debut but also saw a widening melodic strain that would come to full bloom in Broadrick's post-Godflesh act Jesu." Trouser Press reported that the album drops the previous techno inclinations for "slow-motion Melvins meltdown surrealism and variations on Chicago skronk ratchetry." In 2018, Broadrick called the track "Anything Is Mine" a blatant rip-off of Celtic Frost.

Broadrick considered Selfless the "last pure record" that Godflesh made until reforming and releasing 2014's A World Lit Only by Fire and 2017's Post Self.

== Release and critical reception ==
Professional ratings
Review scores
Source	Rating
AllMusic	3/5 stars
Collector's Guide to Heavy Metal	4/10
Kerrang!	4/5 stars

Licensed by Columbia Records to break the band to a larger alternative audience, the album sold approximately 180,000 copies, yielding a commercial result below expectations. New Zealand drone metal band Black Boned Angel named themselves after the album's third track.

AllMusic critic Ned Raggett wrote that some tunes on the record are "both unpleasant enough to keep the wimps away and accessible enough to win over the more open-minded." Raggett further added: "It's a slightly uneasy balance but one that the band still makes work, with enough worthy tunes on Selfless to make it of interest." Joe Coyle of Duke University's The Chronicle praised Selfless as Godflesh's first complete, satisfying album, writing, "And while the song structures on this new album still remain far from complex, they are all perfect. This album is an achievement that has been long overdue."

== Track listing ==
All lyrics are written by Justin Broadrick; all music is composed by Broadrick and G.C. Green.

No.	Title	Length
1.	"Xnoybis"	5:54
2.	"Bigot"	4:33
3.	"Black Boned Angel"	6:46
4.	"Anything Is Mine"	3:59
5.	"Empyreal"	6:02
6.	"Crush My Soul"	4:26
7.	"Body Dome Light"	5:30
8.	"Toll"	4:13
9.	"Heartless"	5:32
10.	"Mantra"	7:26

CD-only track
No.	Title	Length
11.	"Go Spread Your Wings"	23:51
Total length:		78:12

== Personnel ==
All credits for Selfless are adapted from the album’s liner notes.

Godflesh

- Justin Broadrick – vocals, guitar, engineering, mixing, production
- G.C. Green – bass, synthesizer, engineering, mixing, production
- Machines – rhythm, sampling, synthesizer

Additional personnel

- Bob Ludwig – mastering

== Chart performance ==
Charts (1994)	Peak position
UK Top Independent Albums	12
