= Songs of Love and Hate (Godflesh album) =

Studio album by Godflesh
- Released: 20 August 1996
- Recorded: 1995–1996
- Genre: Industrial metal
- Length: 57:36
- Label: Earache
- Producer: J. K. Broadrick; G. C. Green

Godflesh chronology
Selfless (1994)	Songs of Love and Hate (1996)	Love and Hate in Dub (1997)

Songs of Love and Hate is the fourth studio album by English industrial metal band Godflesh. Released on 20 August 1996 through Earache Records, it is the band's first album to feature live drums, played by drummer Bryan Mantia, combining a heavy metal sound with a more pronounced hip-hop influence, toning down the industrial and mechanical elements of previous releases. The cover is a photograph of Cancer Alley, Louisiana.

An accompanying dub-inspired remix album, Love and Hate in Dub, was released in 1997. Both records were reissued by Earache in 2009.

== Music and composition ==
The choice to replace Godflesh's signature drum machines with a combination of sampled loops and live drumming by Bryan Mantia stemmed from Justin Broadrick's growing dissatisfaction with the limitation of mechanical percussion. After initially making Songs of Love and Hate exclusively with machines, Broadrick decided that there was a lack of dynamic range and groove. About the search for the proper drummer, Broadrick said, "The aim was to get a drummer who plays like a machine, but we wanted a feeling of movement and motion as opposed to a machine where it's very, very static."

"Angel Domain"
"Angel Domain" showcases the aggressive, natural drumming on the album.

Mantia said in 2018 that he was approached by his cousin, who was managing Mr. Bungle at the time, to join the band. Initially, he felt intimidated by Broadrick, calling him "scary," but soon found a common ground for their love of jungle music. A few months after the album's release, Mantia was unable to commit his time in Europe and left the band. He has not been in contact with Broadrick ever since but would love to someday.

According to AllMusic's Jason Birchmeier, Songs of Love and Hate sounds "less mechanical and more fluid than preceding albums." Most of the tracks are on the verse-chorus-verse form. On the album's sound, Meier further commented, "The monolithic riffs grind harmoniously as they never have before, with Broadrick's gigantic guitar tone bulging through the speakers with rude, distorted salience while Green's bass guitar grinds with more prominence than one can nearly handle. To make the sounds even more extreme, B. Mantia smashes and hammers his drums with rabid aggression, instilling the sense of anger than no machine can possibly accomplish." Peter Buckley, the author of The Rough Guide to Rock, considered Mantia's drumming as "occasionally funky".

In 2018, on the tour supporting Godflesh's 2017 album Post Self, the band performed "Gift from Heaven" live. It was quickly dropped from the set for, according to Broadrick, not working in a live setting.

== Critical reception ==
Professional ratings
Review scores
Source	Rating
AllMusic	3/5 stars
Alternative Press	5/5 stars
Chronicles of Chaos	7/10
Collector's Guide to Heavy Metal	5/10
Vox	7/10

AllMusic critic Jason Birchmeier said that "never before has the group rocked so hard, sounding tighter as a unit and more human than ever before." Alternative Press wrote, "Imagine a confluence between Black Sabbath and Wu-Tang Clan's rhythms." Valerie Potter of Vox called the album "challenging and savagely satisfying". In his Reissue Review, The Quietus' Mark Eglinton, who viewed the album as "accessible", described it as "a fulcrum for Godflesh", further writing that it "stands resolute as a unique snapshot of a shift in the Godflesh trajectory, as well as being their most multi-faceted release." In reviewing a compilation including Songs of Love and Hate, Eric Schneider of AllMusic said the album was arguably Godflesh's most straightforward release.

=== Accolades ===
Year	Publication	Country	Accolade	Rank	Ref.
1996	Terrorizer	United Kingdom	"Albums of the Year"	2	
1996	The Wire	United Kingdom	"Records of the Year"	39	

== Track listing ==
No.	Title	Length
1.	"Wake"	4:19
2.	"Sterile Prophet"	4:18
3.	"Circle of Shit"	4:53
4.	"Hunter"	4:39
5.	"Gift from Heaven"	7:45
6.	"Amoral"	4:56
7.	"Angel Domain"	3:55
8.	"Kingdom Come"	5:34
9.	"Time, Death and Wastefulness"	6:12
10.	"Frail"	5:24
Total length:		51:55

CD-only track
No.	Title	Length
11.	"Almost Heaven"	5:41
Total length:		57:36

== Personnel ==
- G. C. Green – bass guitar
- Justin Broadrick – guitar, vocals
- Bryan Mantia – drums
