= Purge (Godflesh album) =

Studio album by Godflesh
- Released: 9 June 2023
- Genre: Industrial metal
- Length: 43:43
- Label: Avalanche
- Producer: Justin Broadrick

Godflesh chronology
Post Self (2017)	Purge (2023)	A World Lit Only by Dub (2024)

Singles from Purge
- 1. "Nero" Released: 3 April 2023; 2. "Land Lord" Released: 31 May 2023

Purge is the ninth studio album by English industrial metal band Godflesh, released on 9 June 2023. The album, originally announced on 1 March 2023, "revisits and updates the concepts explored on Pure", the group's 1992 sophomore album. The title "Purge" refers to how frontman Justin Broadrick "utilises Godflesh's music as a temporary relief from his diagnosed autism and PTSD."

Broadrick teased the first single, "Nero", on social media accounts in early March 2023. The song, along with three in-house remixes, was released on 3 April 2023.

Professional ratings
Aggregate scores
Source	Rating
Metacritic	80/100
Review scores
Source	Rating
AllMusic	3.5/5 stars
Exclaim!	8/10
Pitchfork	7.4/10
Sputnikmusic	3.3/5 stars

== Accolades ==
Year	Publication	Country	Accolade	Rank	Ref.
2023	Metal Hammer	United Kingdom	"50 Best Albums of 2023"	16	
2023	The Quietus	United Kingdom	"Albums of the Year 2023"	87	
2023	Rolling Stone	United States	"The 100 Best Albums of 2023"	97	

== Track listing ==
All songs written by Justin Broadrick.

Purge track listing
No.	Title	Length
1.	"Nero"	4:31
2.	"Land Lord"	4:56
3.	"Army of Non"	4:53
4.	"Lazarus Leper"	6:10
5.	"Permission"	5:21
6.	"The Father"	4:56
7.	"Mythology of Self"	4:59
8.	"You Are the Judge, the Jury, and the Executioner"	7:57
Total length:		43:43

Japanese edition bonus disc, "Nero" remixes
No.	Title	Length
1.	"Nero" (Remix)	5:03
2.	"Nero" (Alt Version)	4:31
3.	"Nero" (Dub)	9:24

== Personnel ==
- Justin Broadrick – guitars, vocals, production, machines
- Ben Green – bass

== Charts ==
Chart performance for Purge
Chart (2023)	Peak position
Scottish Albums (Official Charts)	65
UK Independent Albums (Official Charts)	29
US Top Album Sales (Billboard)	94
