= Us and Them (Godflesh album) =

Studio album by Godflesh
- Released: 17 May 1999 (Europe); 8 June 1999 (North America)
- Recorded: 1997–1999
- Genre: Industrial metal
- Length: 64:05
- Label: Earache
- Producer: Justin Broadrick; G. C. Green

Godflesh chronology
| Love and Hate in Dub (1997) | Us and Them (1999) | In All Languages (2001) |

Us and Them is the fifth studio album by English industrial metal band Godflesh. It was released through Earache Records on 17 May 1999 in Europe and on 8 June 1999 in North America. As with Godflesh's 1997 remix album Love and Hate in Dub, Us and Them is influenced by breakbeats, drum and bass, oldschool jungle, trip hop and hip hop.

Shortly after Us and Them's release, Godflesh frontman Justin Broadrick admitted that he "hated" the album as it was the expression of an "identity crisis". Years later, he revised his thoughts, saying that his hatred of Us and Them was "overstated", and that his main issue in the album lies in its more "cringe-worthy moments."

== Composition and music ==
"Nail"
"Nail" shows the album's partial return to industrial metal

"Endgames"
"Endgames" shows the album's focus on hip hop experimentation

Us and Them features a sound similar to Songs of Love and Hate's remix album, Love and Hate in Dub (1997), driven percussively and relying on thumping drum and bass and hip hop rhythms. AllMusic critic John Bush, who described the record as "heavy grindcore with drum machines," wrote: "From the drum'n'bass onslaught of the opener though, it's clear that Us and Them is more indebted to electronics and pure noise. The razor-sharp guitars and sweeping, guttural vocals that fans have come to expect from any Godflesh record are still intact, but the pair extend the sound with avenues rarely heard on their proper albums." Ian Christe of CMJ thought that rather than the lurching stomp of 1992's Pure, Us and Them calls on trip-hop and slowed jungle. Decibel's Kevin Stewart-Panko also thought that the track "Internal" "acts as an elegiac, post-punk, shoegazing harbinger of what was to come on Hymns and the Jesu project." In a 2015 retrospective with Consequence of Sound, Broadrick said Us and Them "was so informed by the excesses of dance music ... But as we know, dance music moves at fucking light speed relative to rock music."

The album's closing track, "Live to Lose", was originally recorded in 1995. It was intended to be a vinyl-only bonus track on Us and Them, but Earache had stopped supporting the format by 1999. Shortly after releasing Us and Them, Godflesh began work on a proposed remix album, Us and Them in Dub. While this album was never released, two tracks from it appear on the 2001 compilation In All Languages.

== Critical reception ==
Professional ratings
Review scores
| Source | Rating |
|---|---|
| AllMusic | 4/5 stars |
| Chronicles of Chaos | 8.5/10 |
| Collector's Guide to Heavy Metal | 5/10 |
| Kerrang! | 5/5 stars |
| The Wire | Very positive |

AllMusic's John Bush wrote: "In a sense though, Us and Them is the same kind of record Godflesh has been making since its inception... It's just that the duo has pushed the envelope much farther than any of its contemporaries." Chronicles of Chaos critic Paul Schwarz thought: "At 64 minutes, Us and Them is a lot to take in, especially in one sitting, and I find it a little bit of a struggle as an album, but it does have some great tracks and creates a blanket of depressive, atmospheric industrial sound which is hard to throw off." Ian Christe of CMJstated: "Start to finish, this is a beautiful, moody and sincere record from a band most thought had milked its last cow." Ken Hollings of The Wire wrote, "Out of the masterful, combative collection of rants, songs and beats on Us and Them, Godflesh has conjured up a minor apocalypse. Not a moment too soon."

== Track listing ==
All tracks are written by Justin Broadrick and G. C. Green.

| No. | Title | Length |
|---|---|---|
| 1. | "I, Me, Mine" | 5:20 |
| 2. | "Us and Them" | 5:56 |
| 3. | "Endgames" | 4:56 |
| 4. | "Witchhunt" | 5:11 |
| 5. | "Whose Truth Is Your Truth" | 5:03 |
| 6. | "Defiled" | 5:29 |
| 7. | "Bittersweet" | 4:34 |
| 8. | "Nail" | 4:09 |
| 9. | "Descent" | 5:38 |
| 10. | "Control Freak" | 5:37 |
| 11. | "The Internal" | 6:33 |
| 12. | "Live to Lose" (Bonus track recorded in 1995) | 5:39 |
| Total length: | | 64:05 |

== Personnel ==
Credits adapted from Us and Them liner notes

- Justin Broadrick – guitar, vocals
- G. C. Green – bass
