= Love and Hate in Dub =

Remix album by Godflesh
- Released: 24 June 1997
- Recorded: December 1996 – March 1997
- Studio: Avalanche Studios
- Genre: Industrial; industrial hip hop; dub
- Length: 71:08
- Label: Earache
- Producer: J. K. Broadrick, G. C. Green

Godflesh chronology
| Songs of Love and Hate (1996) | Love and Hate in Dub (1997) | Us and Them (1999) |

Vinyl cover
- Released in 2007

Love and Hate in Dub is the first remix album by English industrial metal band Godflesh released on 24 June 1997 through Earache Records. The remixed songs are sourced from their 1996 album Songs of Love and Hate, and they adopt a more ambient, dub and drum and bass flavor.

== Background and content ==
Godflesh frontman Justin Broadrick originally wanted to get hip hop's top producers to remix the tracks for Love and Hate in Dub (which was tentatively titled Songs of Love and Hate in Dub). This ultimately proved too expensive. As a result and unlike most remix albums, all tracks on Love and Hate in Dub were made and reworked in-house, done by Godflesh's two members, Broadrick and G. C. Green. Broadrick saw Love and Hate in Dub as a sort of response to Songs of Love and Hate, which he found "flat" in comparison. Regarding the remix album, Broadrick said:

"A lot of that spite and shit from Columbia deal and everything really came into play on Songs of Love and Hate. I think that Love and Hate in Dub is a better record than Songs of Love and Hate [...] Just for our own amusement, we were fucking around with the mixes, we were seeing how far we could go with different mixes, and it seemed really attractive. I remember saying to G.C. Green that we should do something with this, and I love remix culture anyway, but there's a lot of tokenism with dance remixes that's quite horrible. That's why we do it ourselves because we have a vision of what we want to achieve, instead of having to draft in other people to give us a vision."

According to Broadrick, the overall fan consensus was that Love and Hate in Dub was an improvement from its source studio album, which received indifferent reviews upon release in 1996. The album begins with a KRS-One sample that, according to Broadrick, confused metal fans.

== Live performance ==
On 4 October 1997, Godflesh performed at The Garage, London in an unusual configuration and with an abnormal set list. Instead of playing guitar, Broadrick was stationed at a mixing desk (something that he would further explore more than a decade later with his JK Flesh project). Green played bass for most of the show, but near the end, he joined Broadrick behind the desk. Steve Hough was brought in to play guitar, and Diarmuid Dalton, a frequent collaborator with Broadrick, operated a Moog synthesizer. It was at this one-off show that Love and Hate in Dub was performed.

== Release and reception ==
Professional ratings
Review scores
| Source | Rating |
|---|---|
| AllMusic | 4/5 stars |

On 24 June 1997, Love and Hate in Dub was released as a Digipak CD through Earache Records. In 2007, Kreation Records reissued the remix album on vinyl with tracks 4, 10, and 12 cut. In a positive review of Love and Hate in Dub, AllMusic writer Sean Cooper said, "The result is a more lithe, slithery redivision of Godflesh's metallic murk, some tracks echoing with deep, bassy drones, others pummeling away with odd rhythmic timbres and quasi-jungular patterns."

=== Accolades ===
| Year | Publication | Country | Accolade | Rank |
|---|---|---|---|---|
| 1997 | Terrorizer | United Kingdom | "Albums of the Year" | 15 |
"*" denotes an unordered list.

== Track listing ==
All songs written and remixed by Justin Broadrick and G. C. Green.

| No. | Title | Length |
|---|---|---|
| 1. | "Circle of Shit" (To the Point Dub) | 4:49 |
| 2. | "Wake" (Break Mix) | 5:23 |
| 3. | "Almost Heaven" (Closer Mix) | 5:42 |
| 4. | "Gift from Heaven" (Breakbeat) | 5:55 |
| 5. | "Frail" (Now Broken) | 5:18 |
| 6. | "Sterile Prophet" (Version) | 4:42 |
| 7. | "Almost Heaven" (Helldub) | 5:49 |
| 8. | "Kingdom Come" (Version) | 5:52 |
| 9. | "Time, Death and Wastefulness" (In Dub) | 7:16 |
| 10. | "Sterile Prophet" (In Dub) | 5:03 |
| 11. | "Domain" | 5:04 |
| 12. | "Gift from Heaven" (Heavenly) | 10:11 |
| Total length: | | 71:08 |

2007 vinyl reissue (side A)
| No. | Title | Length |
|---|---|---|
| 1. | "Circle of Shit" (To the Point Dub) | 4:49 |
| 2. | "Wake" (Break Mix) | 5:23 |
| 3. | "Almost Heaven" (Closer Mix) | 5:42 |
| 4. | "Frail" (Now Broken) | 5:18 |
| 5. | "Sterile Prophet" (Version) | 4:42 |
| 6. | "Almost Heaven" (Helldub) | 5:49 |

2007 vinyl reissue (side B)
| No. | Title | Length |
|---|---|---|
| 1. | "Kingdom Come" (Version) | 5:52 |
| 2. | "Time, Death and Wastefulness" (In Dub) | 7:16 |
| 3. | "Domain" | 5:04 |
| Total length: | | 49:59 |

== Personnel ==
Credits adapted from CD liner notes.

Godflesh

- G. C. Green – bass
- J. K. Broadrick – guitar, vocals
- Bryan Mantia – drums
- Machines – rhythm, samples, synth

Additional personnel

- Antz White – design
- San Kittner – photography
- Chris Oxford – photography
