= Erotic art =

Visual art created to incite sexual arousal and activity

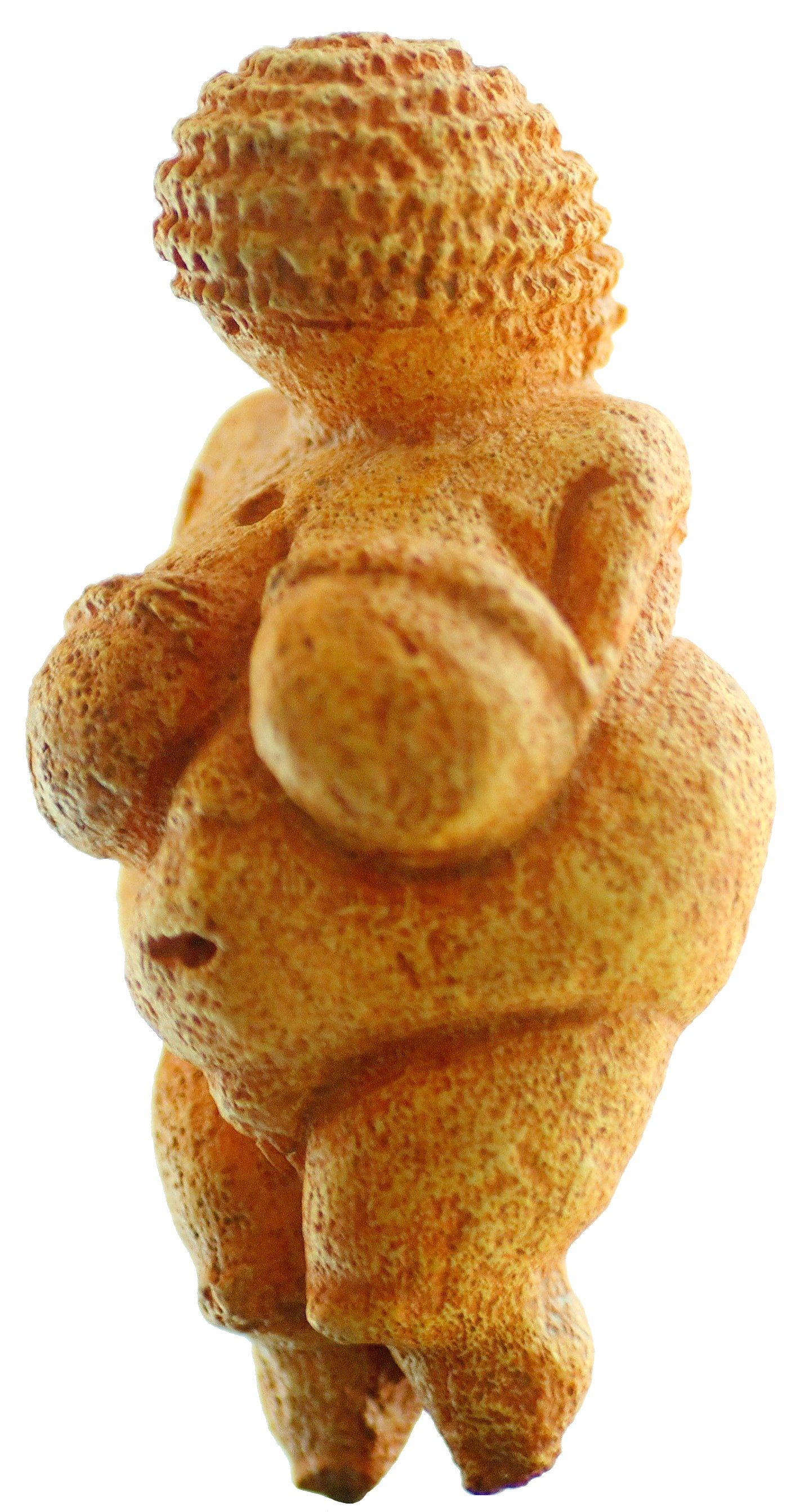
The Venus of Willendorf, a figurine with exaggerated sexual characteristics. Estimated to have been made c. 30,000 years ago

Erotic art is a broad field of the visual arts that includes any artistic work intended to evoke arousal. It usually depicts human nudity or sexual activity, and has included works in various visual mediums, including drawings, engravings, films, video games, paintings, photographs, and sculptures.

Some of the earliest known works of art include erotic themes, which have recurred with varying prominence in different societies throughout history. However, it has also been widely considered taboo, with either social norms or laws restricting its creation, distribution, and possession. This is particularly the case when it is deemed pornographic, immoral, or obscene.

== Definition ==
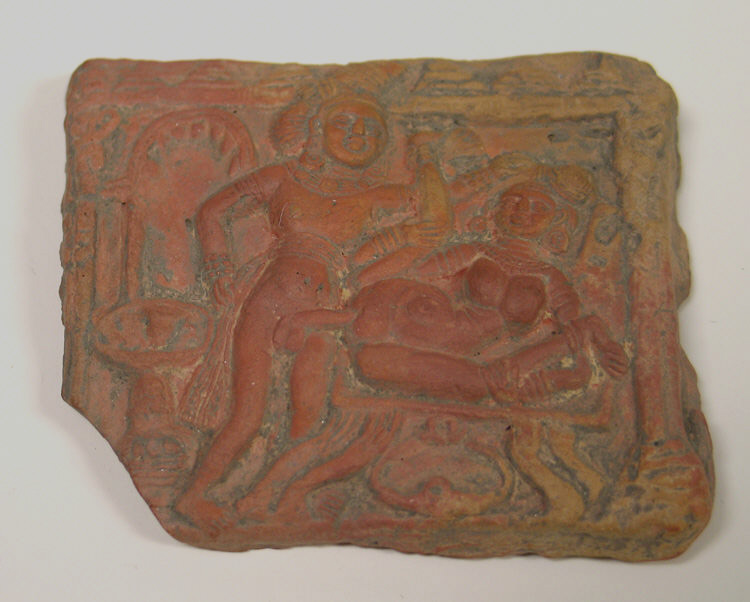
Clay plaque. India. 1st century BCE.

The definition of erotic art can be subjective because it is dependent on context, as perceptions of what is erotic and what is art vary. A sculpture of a phallus in some cultures may be considered a traditional symbol of potency rather than overtly erotic. Material that is produced to illustrate sex education may be perceived by others as inappropriately erotic.

The Stanford Encyclopedia of Philosophy defines erotic art as "art that is made with the intention to stimulate its target audience sexually, and that succeeds to some extent in doing so".

A distinction is often made between erotic art and pornography, which also depicts scenes of sexual activity and is intended to evoke erotic arousal. Pornography is not usually considered fine art. People may draw a distinction based on the work's intent and message: erotic art would be works intended for purposes in addition to arousal, which could be appreciated as art by someone uninterested in their erotic content. US Supreme Court Justice Potter Stewart wrote in 1964 that the distinction was intuitive, saying about hard-core pornography which would not be legally protected as erotic art, "I know it when I see it".

Others, including philosophers Matthew Kieran and Hans Maes, have argued that no strict distinction can be made between erotic art and pornography.

== History ==
Among the oldest surviving examples of erotic depictions are Paleolithic cave paintings and carvings, but many cultures have created erotic art.

Artifacts have been discovered from ancient Mesopotamia depicting explicit heterosexual sex. Glyptic art from the Sumerian Early Dynastic Period frequently shows scenes of frontal sex in the missionary position. In Mesopotamian votive plaques from the early second millennium BC, the man is usually shown entering the woman from behind while she bends over, drinking beer through a straw. Middle Assyrian lead votive figurines often represent the man standing and penetrating the woman as she rests on top of an altar. Scholars have traditionally interpreted all these depictions as scenes of ritual sex, but they are more likely to be associated with the cult of Inanna, the goddess of sex and prostitution. Many sexually explicit images were found in the temple of Inanna at Assur, which also contained models of male and female sexual organs, including stone phalli, which may have been worn around the neck as an amulet or used to decorate cult statues, and clay models of the female vulva.

Depictions of sexual intercourse were not part of the general repertory of ancient Egyptian formal art, but rudimentary sketches of heterosexual intercourse have been found on pottery fragments and in graffiti. The Turin Erotic Papyrus (Papyrus 55001) is an 8.5 feet (2.6 m) by 10 inches (25 cm) Egyptian papyrus scroll discovered at Deir el-Medina, the last two-thirds of which consist of a series of twelve vignettes showing men and women in various sexual positions. The men in the illustrations are "scruffy, balding, short, and paunchy" with exaggeratedly large genitalia and do not conform to Egyptian standards of physical attractiveness. The women are nubile, and they are shown with objects from traditional erotic iconography, such as convolvulus leaves. In some scenes, they hold items traditionally associated with Hathor, the goddess of love, such as lotus flowers, monkeys, and sacred instruments called sistra. The scroll was probably painted in the Ramesside period (1292–1075 BC) and its high artistic quality indicates that was produced for a wealthy audience. No other similar scrolls have been discovered.

The ancient Greeks painted sexual scenes on their ceramics, many of them famous for being some of the earliest depictions of same-sex relations and pederasty, and there are many sexually explicit paintings on the walls of ruined Roman buildings in Pompeii. Edward Perry Warren adopted a love for Greek Art during college and collected Greek erotic art pieces that often represented gay sexual relationships, such as the Warren Cup, a Greco-Roman drinking cup which features scenes of anal sex between males. Many of Warren's eclectic pieces collected over the years are in the Boston Museum of Fine Art.

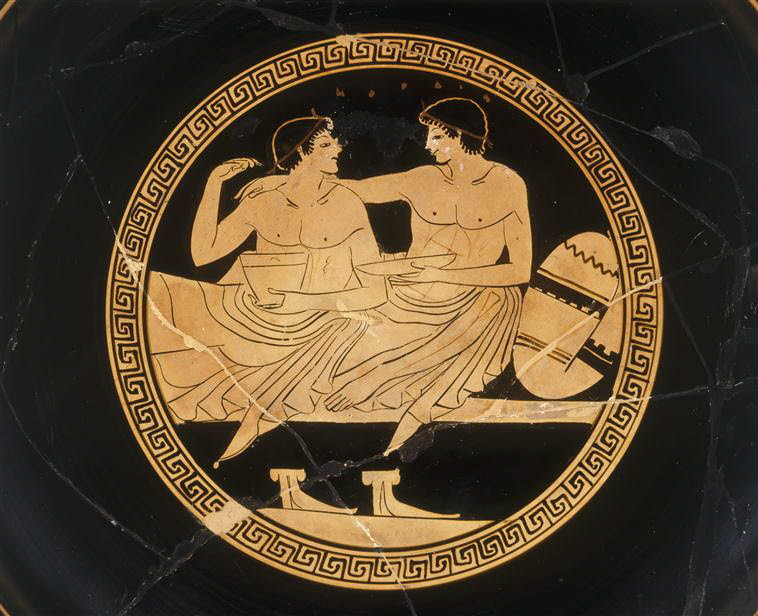
Interior of an Attic cup depicting a "courting couple at the symposium" or a "Symposium scene with youths", by a painter from Colmar, from around 500 - 450 BCE, displayed in the Louvre Museum

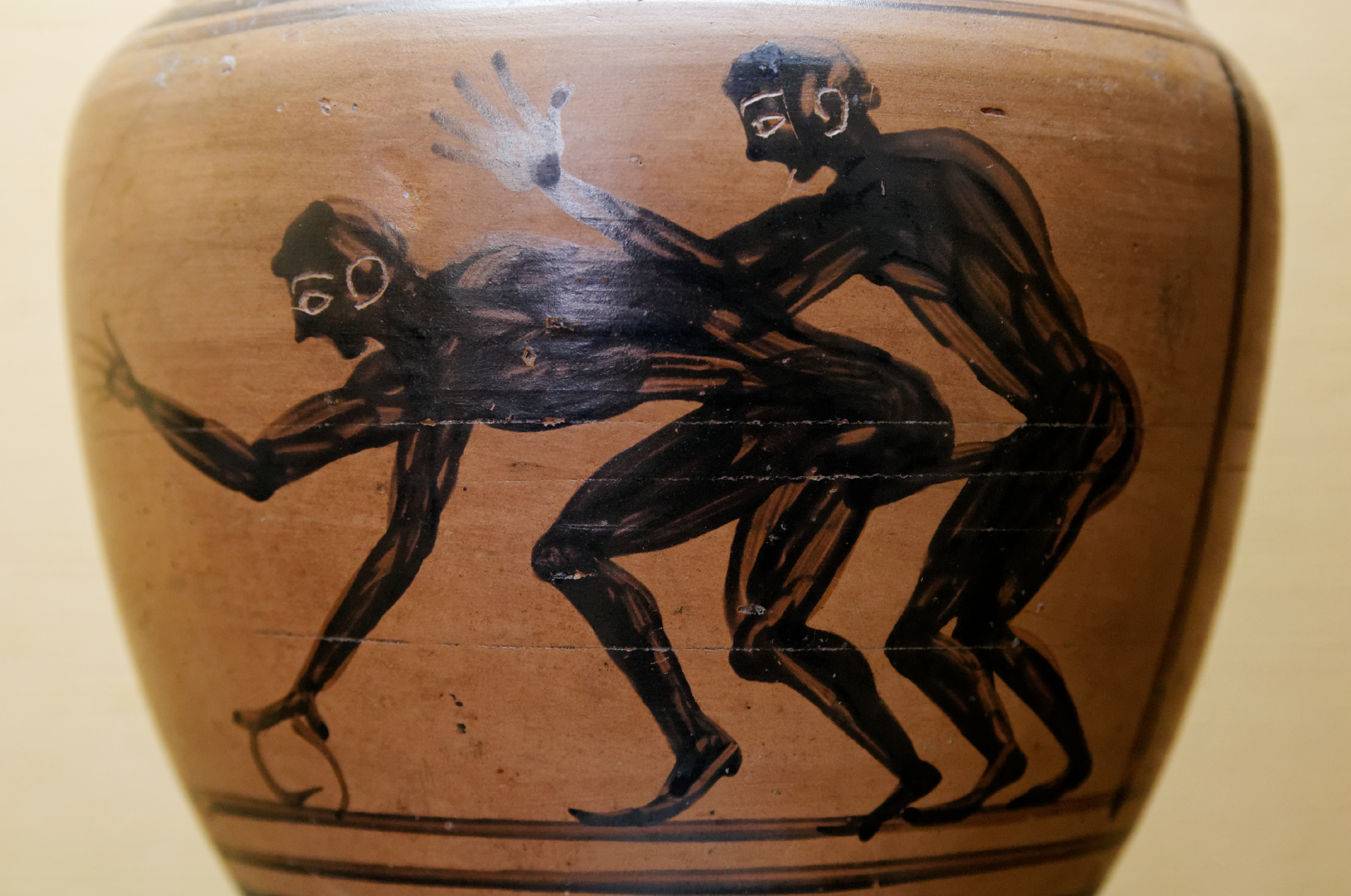
Amphora vase depicting anal sex between two males, with the left figure playing with a hoop, from the Etruscan civilization in the 5th century BCE

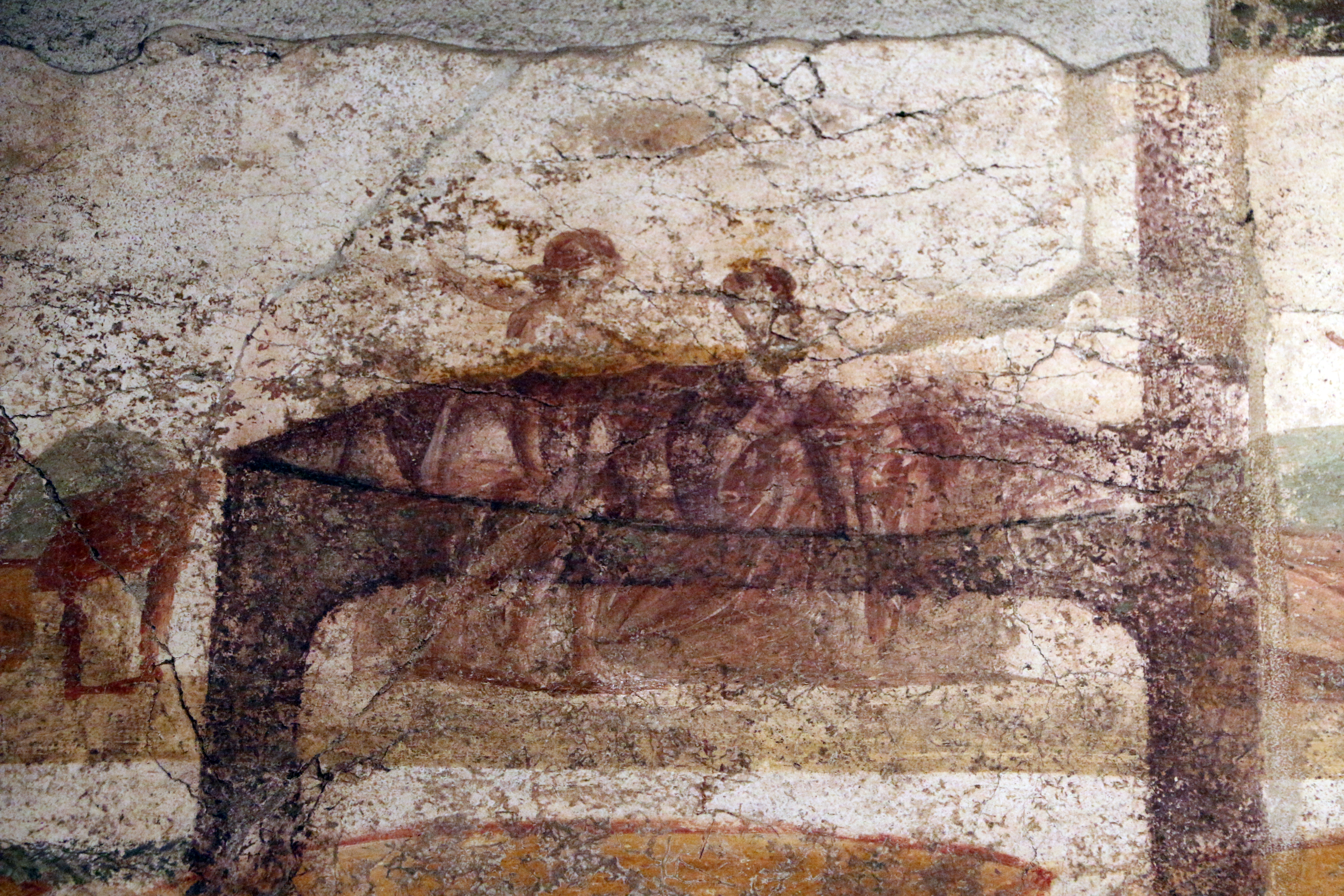
Wall painting of a lesbian sex scene, from the Suburban baths, Pompeii around 62-79CE

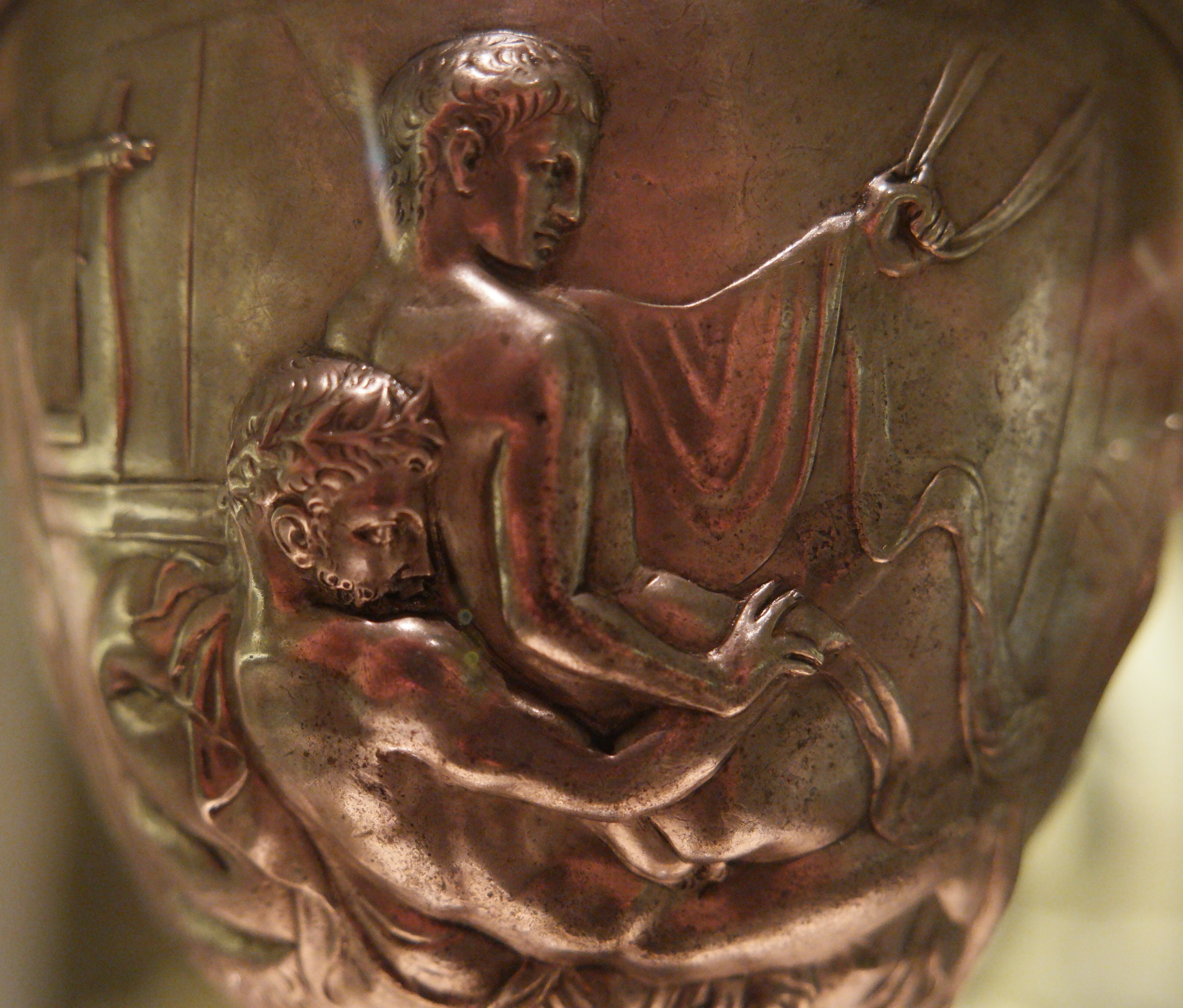
Side A of the Warren Cup, a silver drinking cup with reliefs of with male same-sex acts, from Betar, West Bank in the 1st century CE

The Moche of Peru are another ancient people who sculpted explicit scenes of sex into their pottery. There is an entire gallery devoted to pre-Columbian erotic ceramics (Moche culture) in Lima at the Larco Museum.

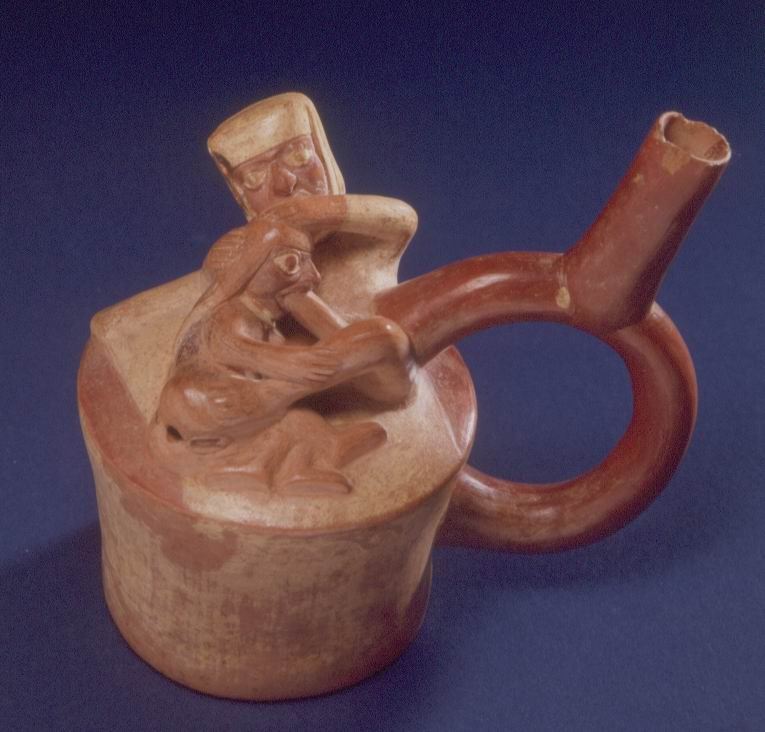
Ceramic vessel depicting oral sex, from the Moche culture around 300 CE, displayed in the Larco Museum

Caliph Al-Walid II, who ruled the Umayyad Caliphate in the 8th century, was a great patron of erotic art. Among the depictions of the Qusayr Amra, which were built by him, is the abundance of naked females and love scenes.

There is a long tradition of erotic art in Eastern cultures. In Japan, for example, shunga appeared in the 13th century and continued to grow in popularity until the late 19th century when photography was invented. In Japan during the Edo period (1600–1869), Shunga, translated to "spring pictures", was a series of sexually explicit paintings created with ink or woodblock works that became printed onto paper scrolls as an introduction to sexual education. Shunga, embraced by individuals as part of the Shinto religion, focused on liberating the innate sexual beings that are within all humans, including women and homosexual sexuality. Couples engaging in sexual acts were shown laughing and enjoying the sexual encounter with their partner; this focused on the positivity of sex. Around 1700, shunga was met with opposition and banned in Japan, but the circulation of this prominent Erotic Art continued. Shunga could be found in local libraries and homes of many Japanese citizens.

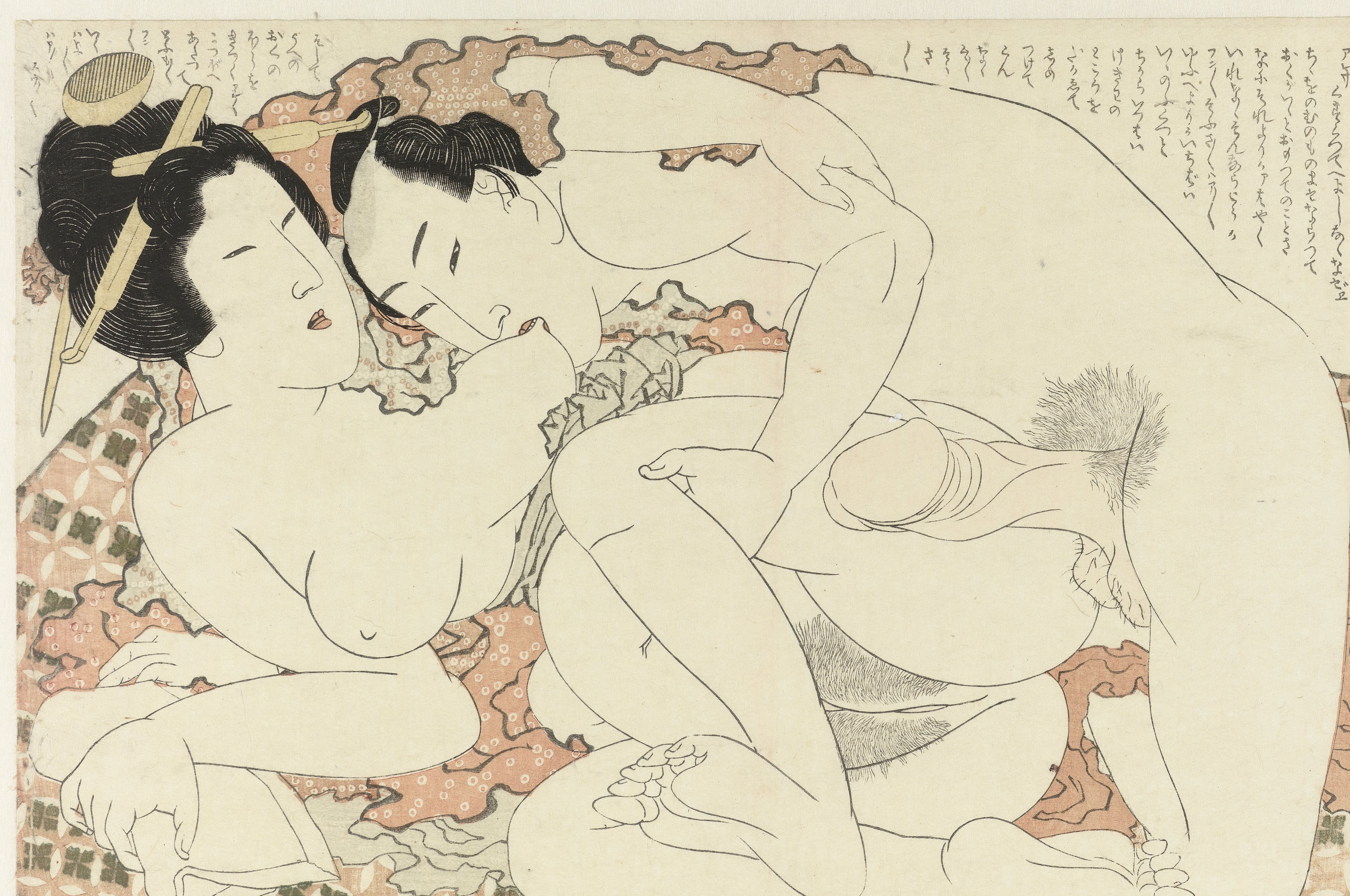
Shunga print, by Hokusai, from Japan around 1815–1823

Similarly, the erotic art of China (known as Chungongtu) reached its popular peak during the latter part of the Ming dynasty.

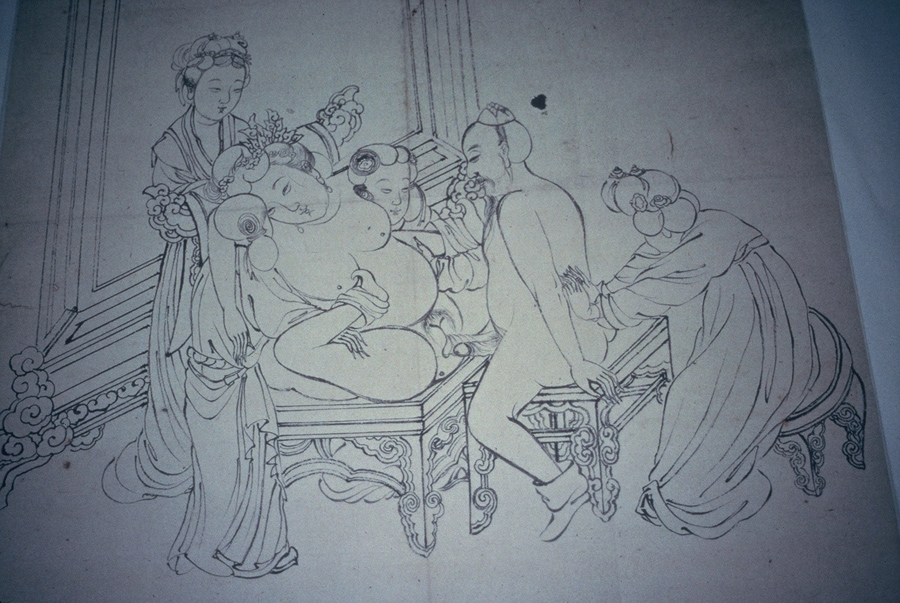
19th century sketch of an erotic painting, from China prior to 960 CE

In India, the famous Kama Sutra is an ancient sex manual that is still popularly read throughout the world.

In Europe, starting with the Renaissance, there was a tradition of producing erotica for the amusement of the aristocracy. I Modi was an erotic book with engravings of sexual scenes by Marcantonio Raimondi that were based on designs by Giulio Romano. I Modi was thought to be created in around 1524 to 1527. In 1601, Caravaggio painted the Amor Vincit Omnia for the collection of the Marquis Vincenzo Giustiniani.

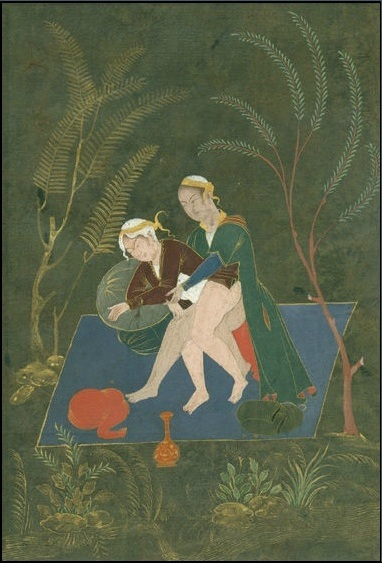
Watercolor painting on paper depicting anal sex between two males, from Persia around 1660 or 1880-1926

An erotic cabinet, ordered by Catherine the Great, seems to have been adjacent to her suite of rooms in the Gatchina Palace. The furniture was eccentric, with tables that had large penises for legs. Penises and vaginas were carved on the furniture and the walls were covered in erotic art. The rooms and the furniture were seen in 1941 by two Wehrmacht-officers but they seem to have vanished since then. A documentary by Peter Woditsch suggests that the cabinet was in the Peterhof Palace and not in Gatchina.

The tradition was continued by other, more modern painters, such as Fragonard, Courbet, Millet, Balthus, Picasso, Edgar Degas, Toulouse-Lautrec and Egon Schiele. Schiele served time in jail and had several works destroyed by the authorities for offending contemporary mores with his depictions of nude girls.

By the 20th century, photography became the most common medium for erotic art. Publishers like Taschen mass-produced erotic illustrations and erotic photography.

== 20th century onwards ==
Many erotic artists worked in the 1910s. Much of the genre is still not as well accepted as the more standard genres of art such as portraiture and landscape. Erotic depictions in art went through a fundamental repositioning over the course of the 20th century.

Early 20th century movements in art such as cubism, futurism, and German expressionism explored the erotic through manipulating the nude to explore multiple viewpoints, colour experimentation, and the simplification of the figure into geometrical components.

In the mid 20th century, realism and surrealism offered new modes of representation of the nude. For surrealist artists, the erotic became a way of exploring ideas of fantasy, the unconscious and the dream state. Artists such as Paul Delvaux, Giorgio de Chirico, and Max Ernst are well-known surrealists that dealt directly with the erotic. In the aftermath of the First World War, a shift away from the abstracted human figures of the 1920s and 1930s and towards realism took place. Artists such as British artist Stanley Spencer led this re-appropriated approach to the human figure in Britain, with naked self-portraits of himself and his second wife in erotic settings. This is explicitly evident in his work Double nude portrait, 1937.

The naked portrait was arguably becoming a category of erotic art that was dominating the 20th century, just as the academic nude had dominated the 19th century. Critical writings on the 'nude' and in particular the female 'nude', meant fundamental shifts in how depictions of the nude and the portrayal of sexuality were being considered. Seminal texts such as British Art historian Kenneth Clark's The nude: a study of ideal art in 1956 and Art Critic John Berger in 1972 in his book Ways of Seeing, were re-examining the notion of the naked and the nude within art. This period in art was defined by an acute engagement with the political. It marked a historical moment that stressed the importance of the sexual revolution upon art.

The 1960s and 1970s were a time of social and political change across the United States and Europe. Movements included the fight for equality for women with a focus on sexuality, reproductive rights, the family, and the workplace. Artists and historians began to investigate how images in Western art and the media, were often produced within a male narrative and particularly how it perpetuated idealisations of the female subject. The questioning and interrogation of the overarching male gaze within the historical art narrative, manifested in both critical writing and artistic practice, came to define much of the mid to late 20th century art and erotic art.

American Art Historian Carol Duncan summarises the male gaze and its relationship to erotic art, writing "More than any other theme, the nude could demonstrate that art originates in and is sustained by male erotic energy. This is why many 'seminal' works of the period are nudes." Artists such as Sylvia Sleigh is an example of this reversal of the male gaze as her work depicts male sitters presented in traditional erotic reclining poses that usually were reserved for the female nude as part of the 'odalisque' tradition.

The rise of feminism, the sexual revolution and conceptual art in the mid 20th century meant that the interaction between the image and audience, and the artist and audience, were beginning to be questioned and redefined, opening up new possible areas of practice. Artists began to use their own nude bodies and began to depict an alternative narrative of the erotic, through new lenses.

New media was beginning to be used to portray the nude and the erotic, with performance and photography being used by women artists, to draw attention to issues of gender power relations and the blurred boundaries between pornography and art. Artists such as Carolee Schneemann, and Hannah Wilke were using these new mediums to interrogate the constructs of gender roles and sexuality. Wilke's photographs, for instance, satirised the mass objectification of the female body in pornography and advertising.

Performance art since the 1960s has flourished and is considered as a direct response and challenge to traditional types of media and was associated with the dematerialization of the artwork or object. As performance that dealt with the erotic flourished in the 1980s and 1990s both male and female artists were exploring new strategies of representation of the erotic.

Martha Edelheit was a female artist known for her contributions to erotic art as a rebellious stance against typical gender roles, which excluded women artists from participating in free sexual expression. This limited women to often be the subject of many famous Erotic Art pieces which catered to men. Edelheit was criticized for being a female artist who created erotic artwork during a time when men were main contributors in this art. Edelheit was a pioneer in the feminist art movement because she was a woman who created erotic art and also depicted herself in many of her works, which paved the way for women's equality in sexual expression.

Edelheit confronted the common stereotype that this art was pornographic by offering an alternative view of oneself. Her works paved the way for women to openly express sexual desires. Painting nude male subjects were uncommon in the 1970s; her Art turned the tables and allowed for women to be at the forefront of this fem expression revolution that occurred in the 70s.

The acceptance and popularity of erotic art has pushed the genre into mainstream pop-culture and has created many famous icons. Frank Frazetta, Luis Royo, Boris Vallejo, Chris Achilleos, and Clyde Caldwell are among the artists whose work has been widely distributed. The Guild of Erotic Artists was formed in 2002 to bring together a body of like-minded individuals whose sole purpose was to express themselves and promote the sensual art of erotica for the modern age.

Between 2010 and 2015 sexologist and gallerist Laura Henkel, curator of the Erotic Heritage Museum and the Sin City Gallery, organised 12 Inches of Sin, an exhibition focussing on art that expresses a diverse view of sexuality and challenging ideas of high and low art. The erotic continues to be explored and employed in new types of art work today and the profound developments of the 20th century still underpin much of the prevailing erotic art and artistic intent.

== Legal standards ==
Whether or not an instance of erotic art is obscene depends on the standards of the jurisdiction and community in which it is displayed.

In the United States, the 1973 ruling of the Supreme Court of the United States in Miller v. California established a three-tiered test to determine what was obscene—and thus not protected, versus what was merely erotic and thus protected by the First Amendment.

Delivering the opinion of the court, Chief Justice Warren Burger wrote,

The basic guidelines for the trier of fact must be: (a) whether 'the average person, applying contemporary community standards' would find that the work, taken as a whole, appeals to the prurient interest, (b) whether the work depicts or describes, in a patently offensive way, sexual conduct specifically defined by the applicable state law; and (c) whether the work, taken as a whole, lacks serious literary, artistic, political, or scientific value.

As this is still much vaguer than other judicial tests within U.S. jurisprudence, it has not reduced the conflicts that often result, especially from the ambiguities concerning what the "contemporary community standards" are. Similar difficulties in distinguishing between erotica and obscenity have been found in other legal systems.

== Gallery ==
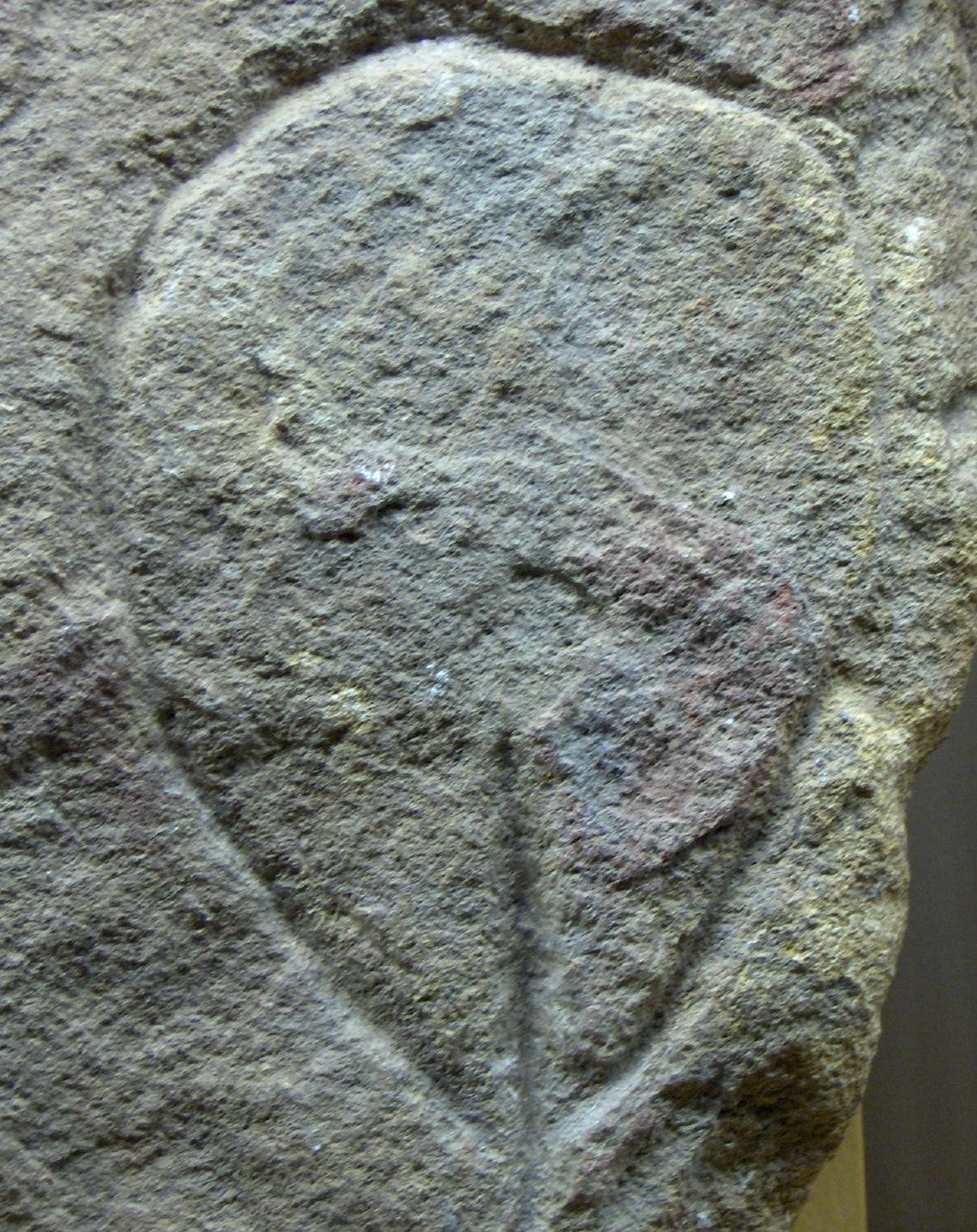
A palaeolithic petroglyph of a vulva

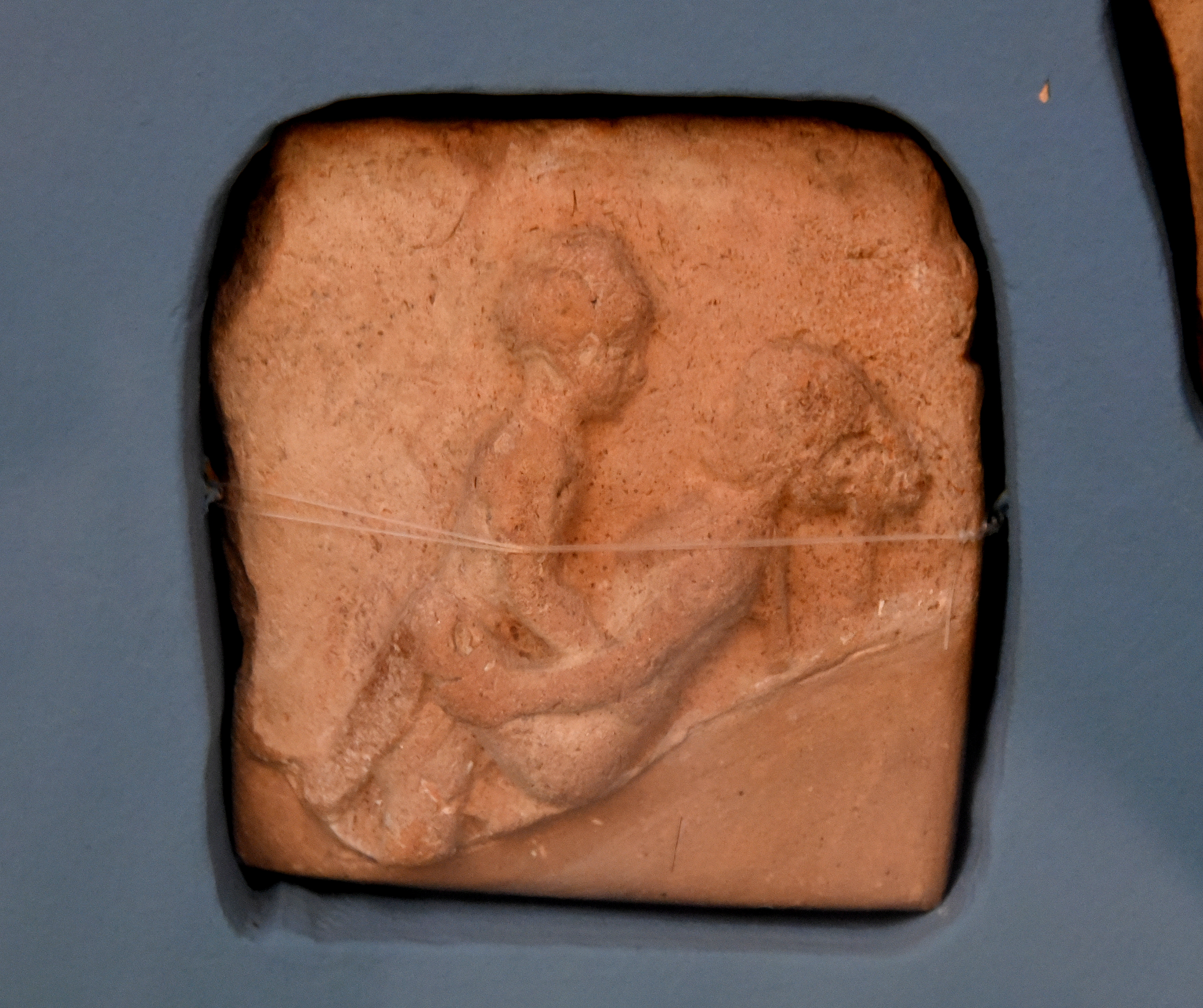
Sex between a female and a male. Terracotta plaque. Old Babylonian Period. Ancient Orient Museum, Istanbul, around 2000–1500 BCE

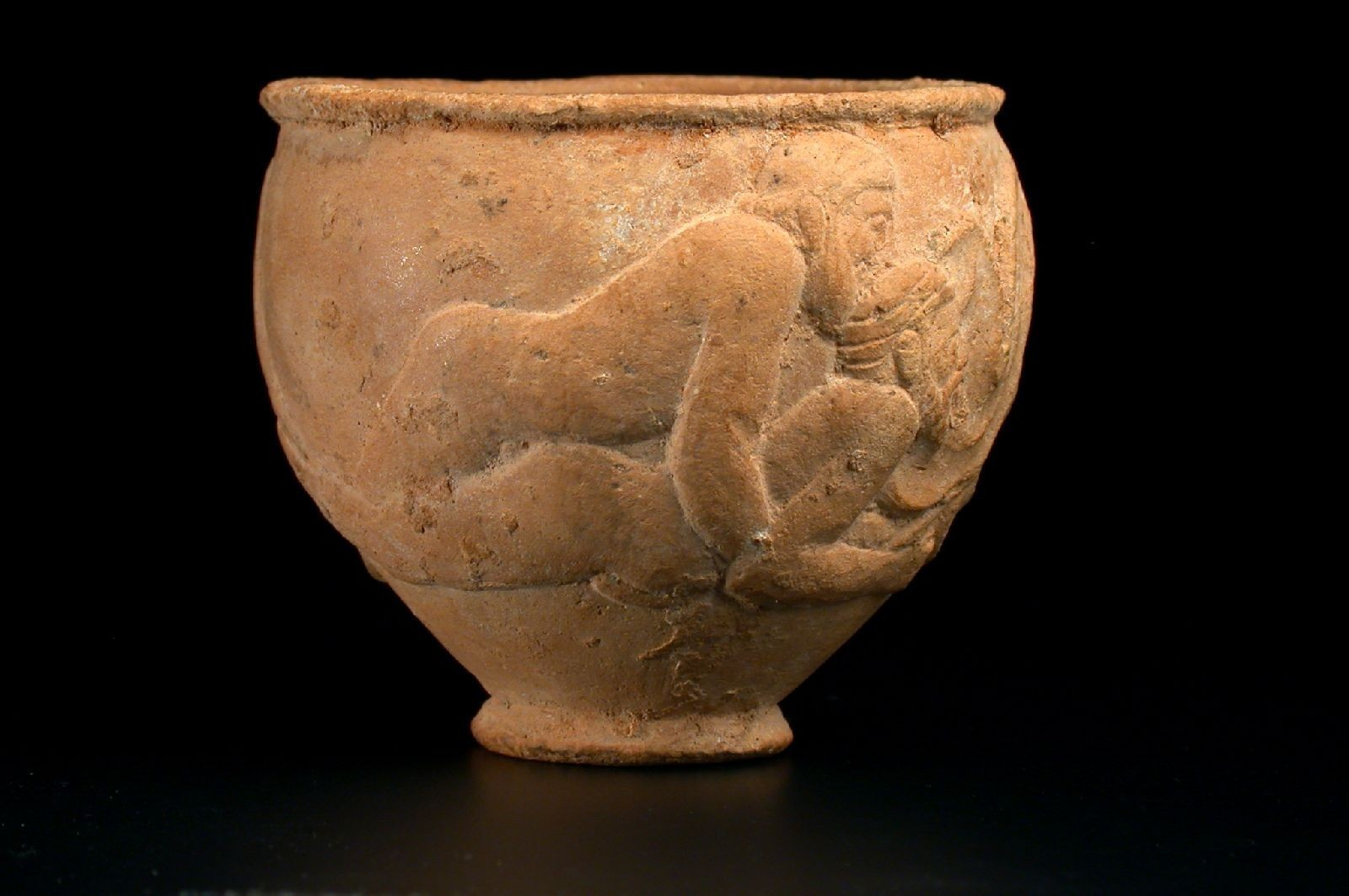
Anal sex between two males. Drinking cup. Greek; archaic period. 550-500 BCE

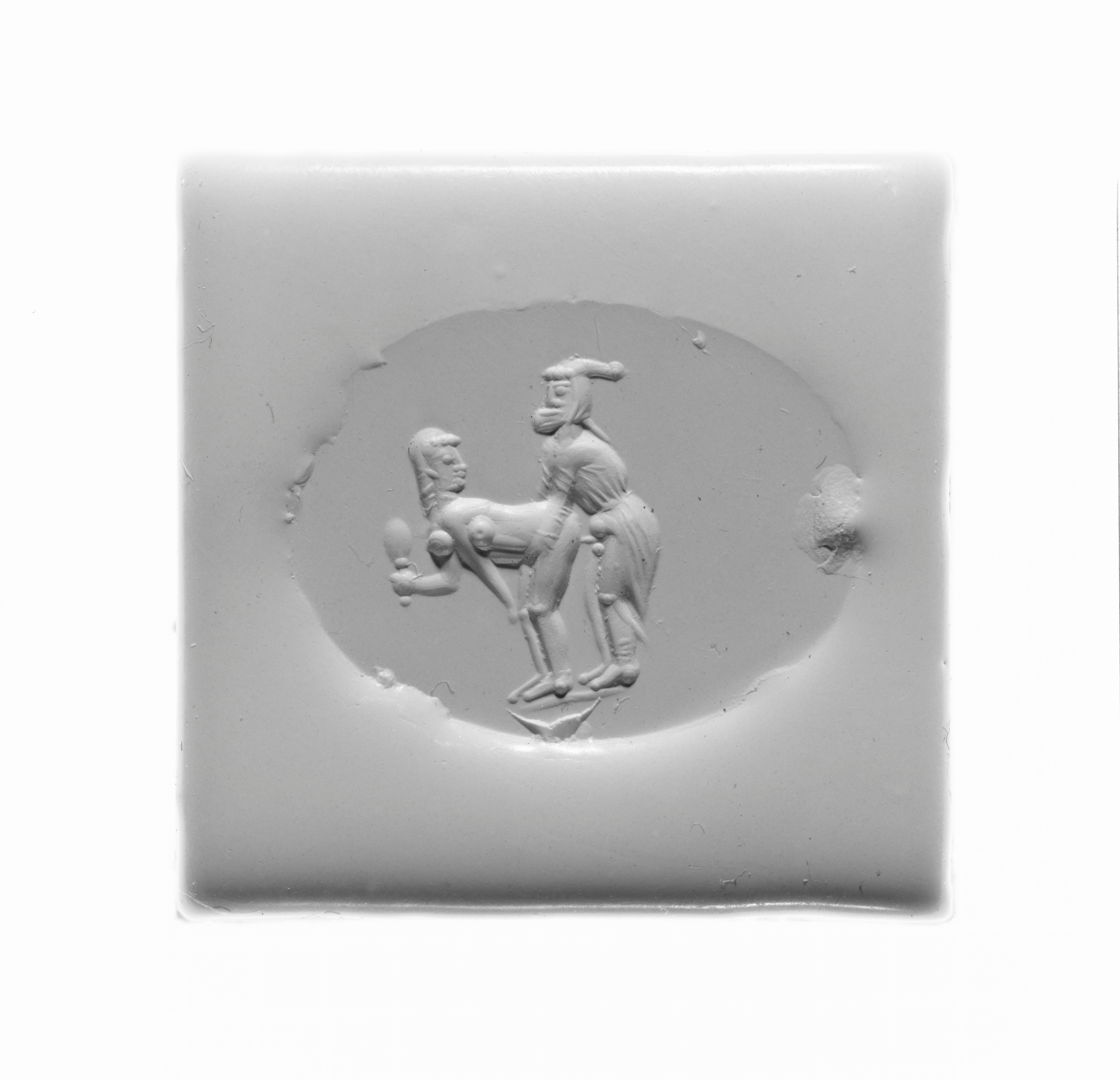
Sex between a female and a male. Engraved scaraboid (gem), White chalcedony. Greco-Persian. 4th century BCE

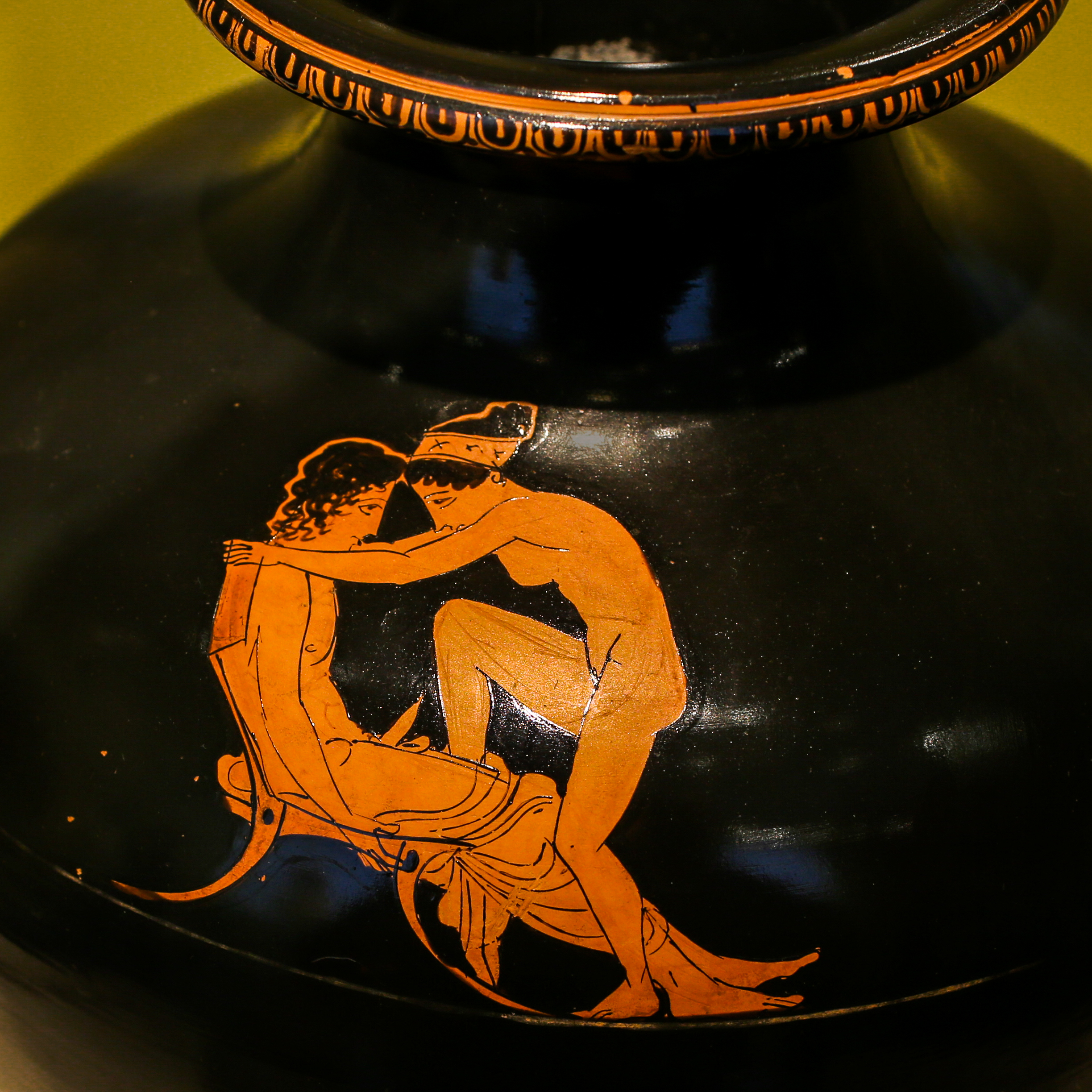
Oinochoe by the Shuvalov Painter, around 430–420 BCE

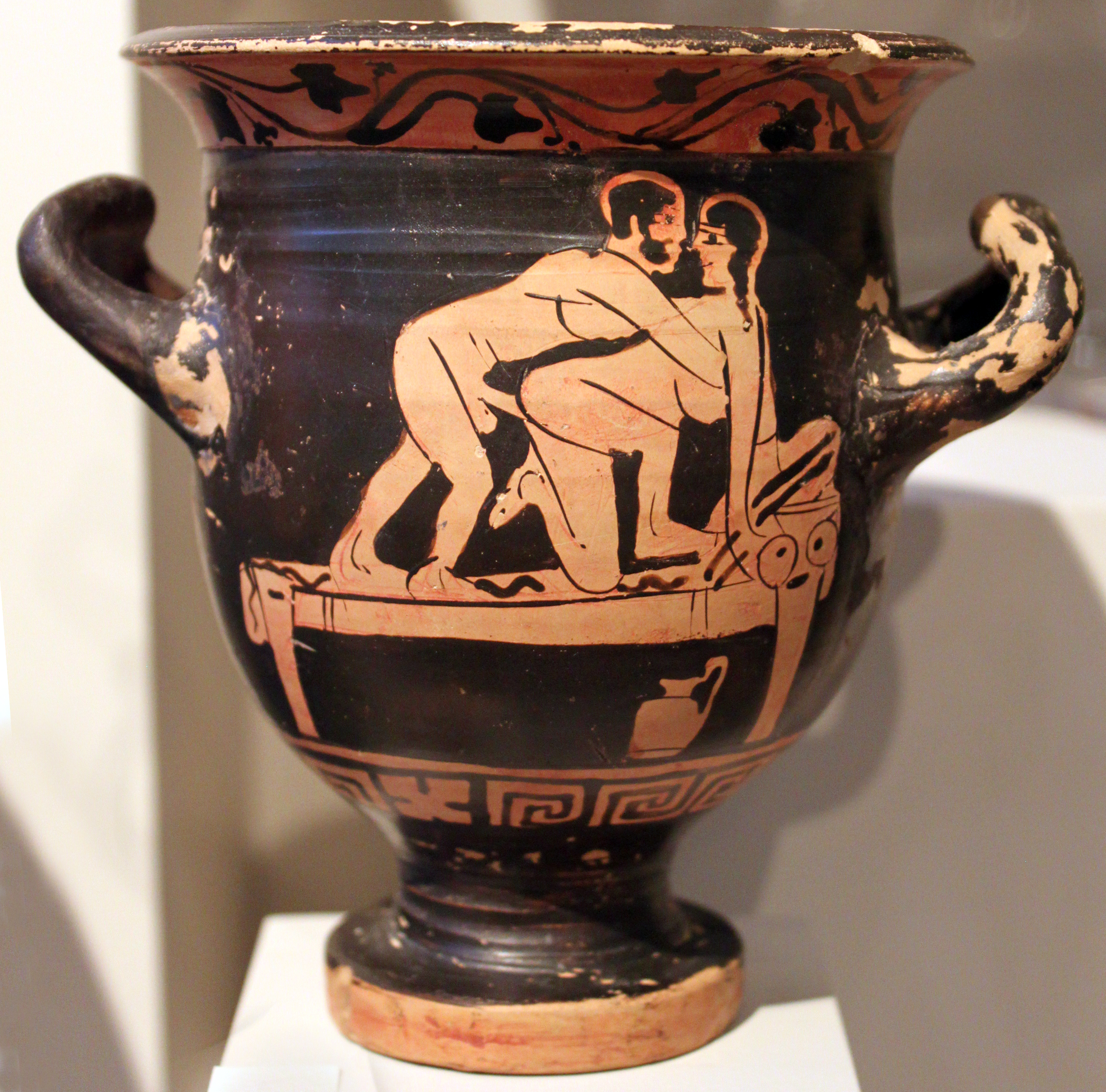
Bell Krater. Ancient Greek. Late 5th to 4th century BCE

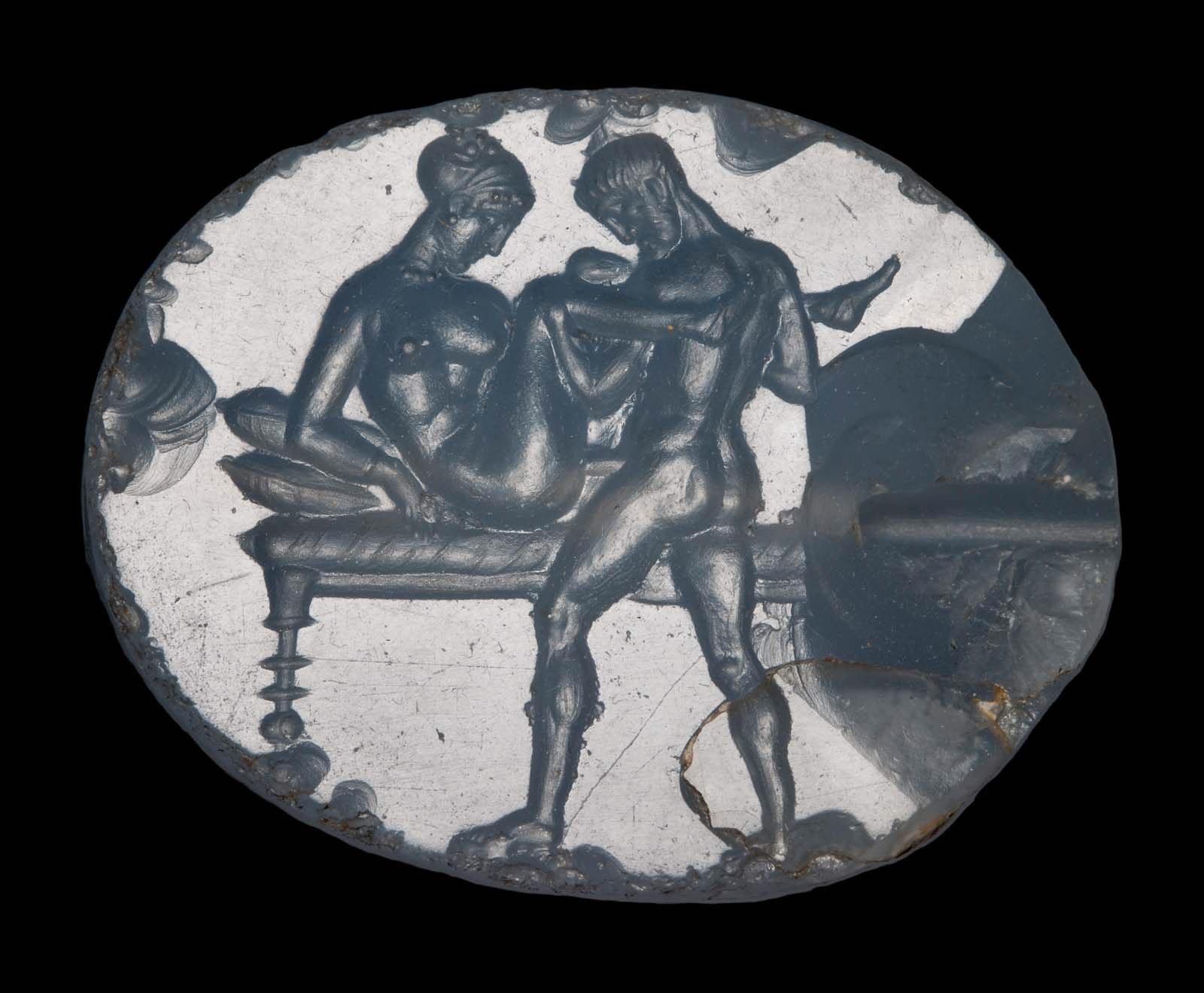
Engraving of a sexual scene on an ancient Greek gem. Late 5th to early 4th century BCE

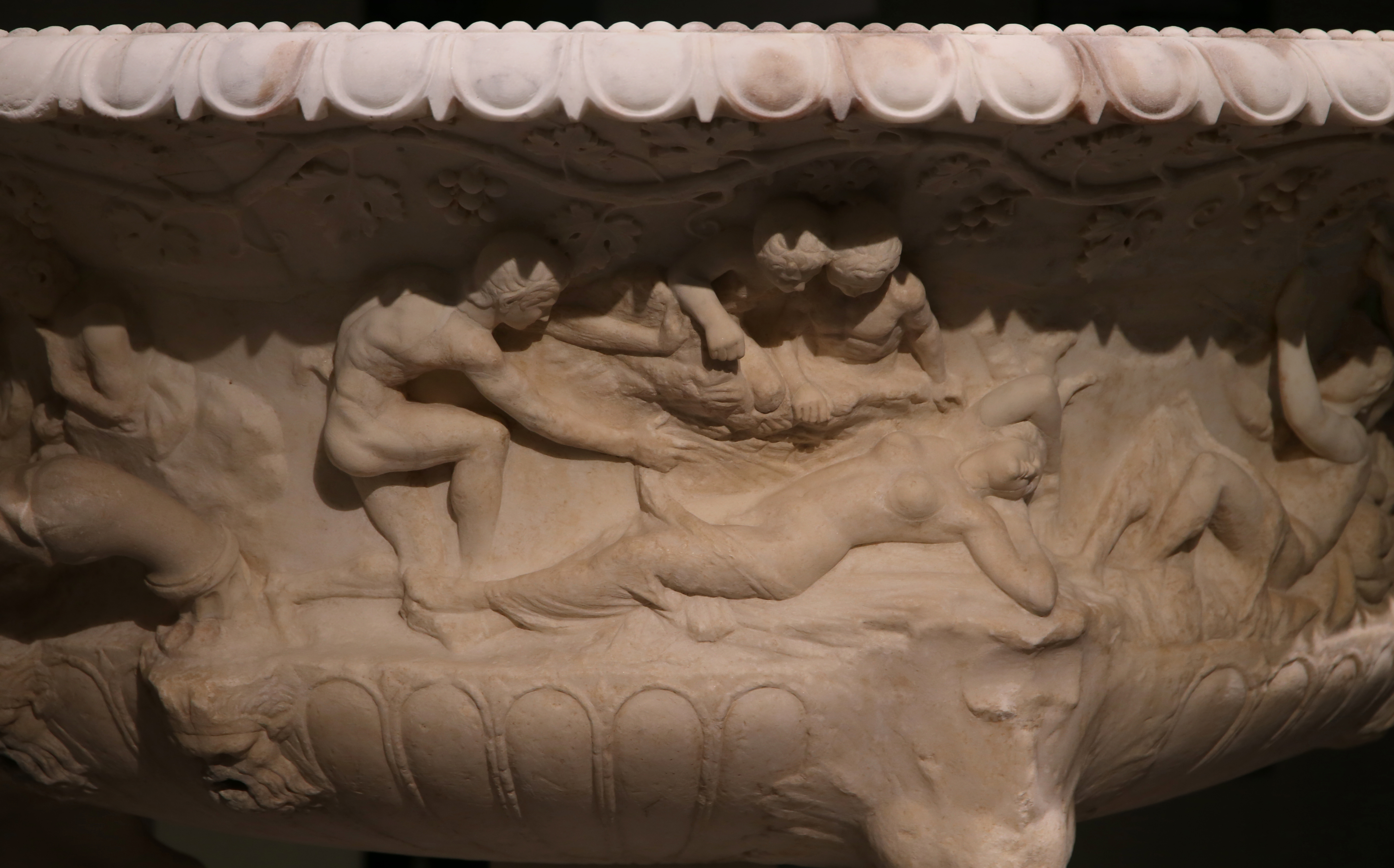
A sleeping Hermaphrodite being viewed. Krater. Marble. Ancient Greek. 110 - 90BCE

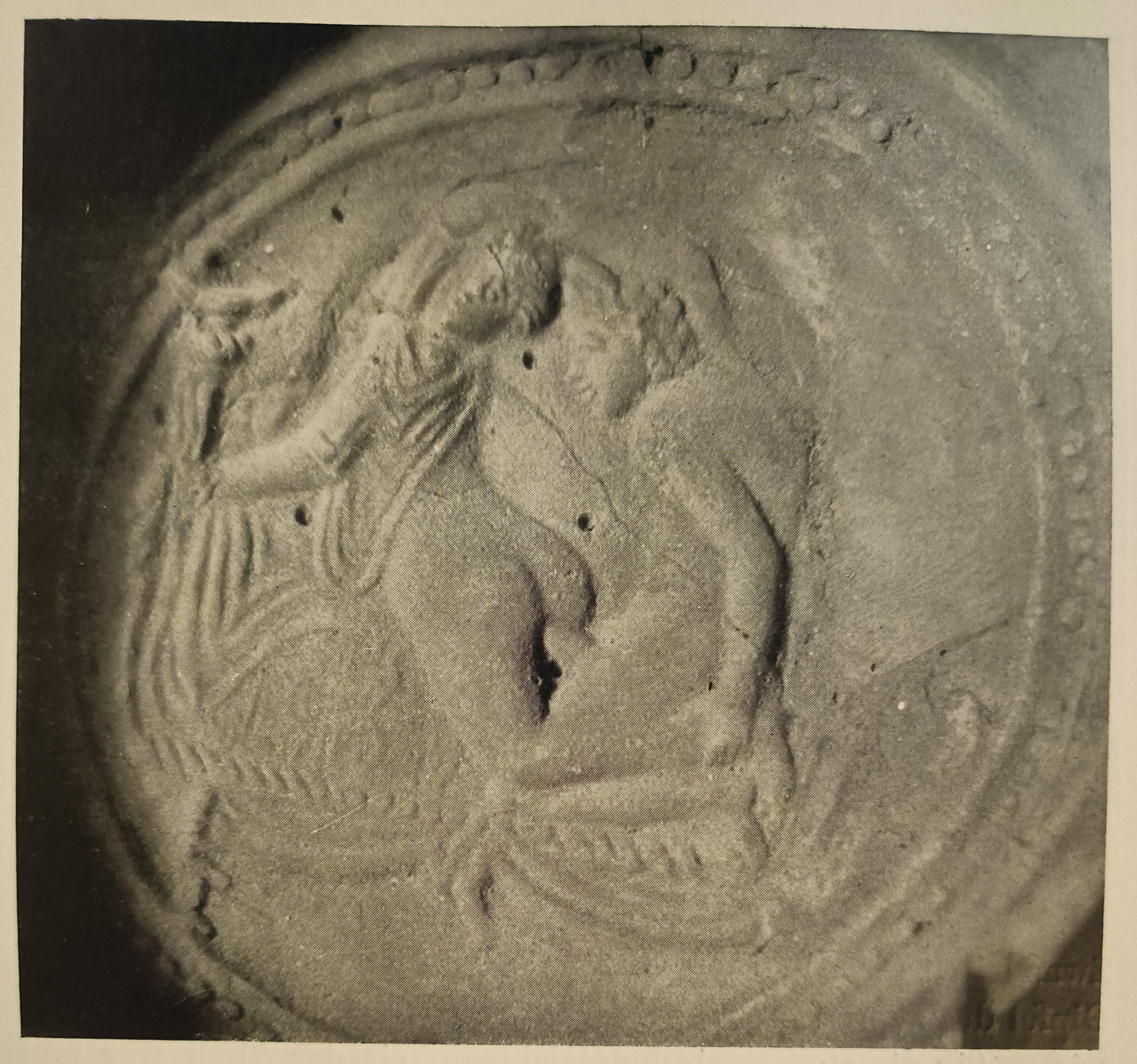
Bottom of a clay bowl. Ancient Roman? Ancient Greek? Hermitage Museum, St. Petersburg

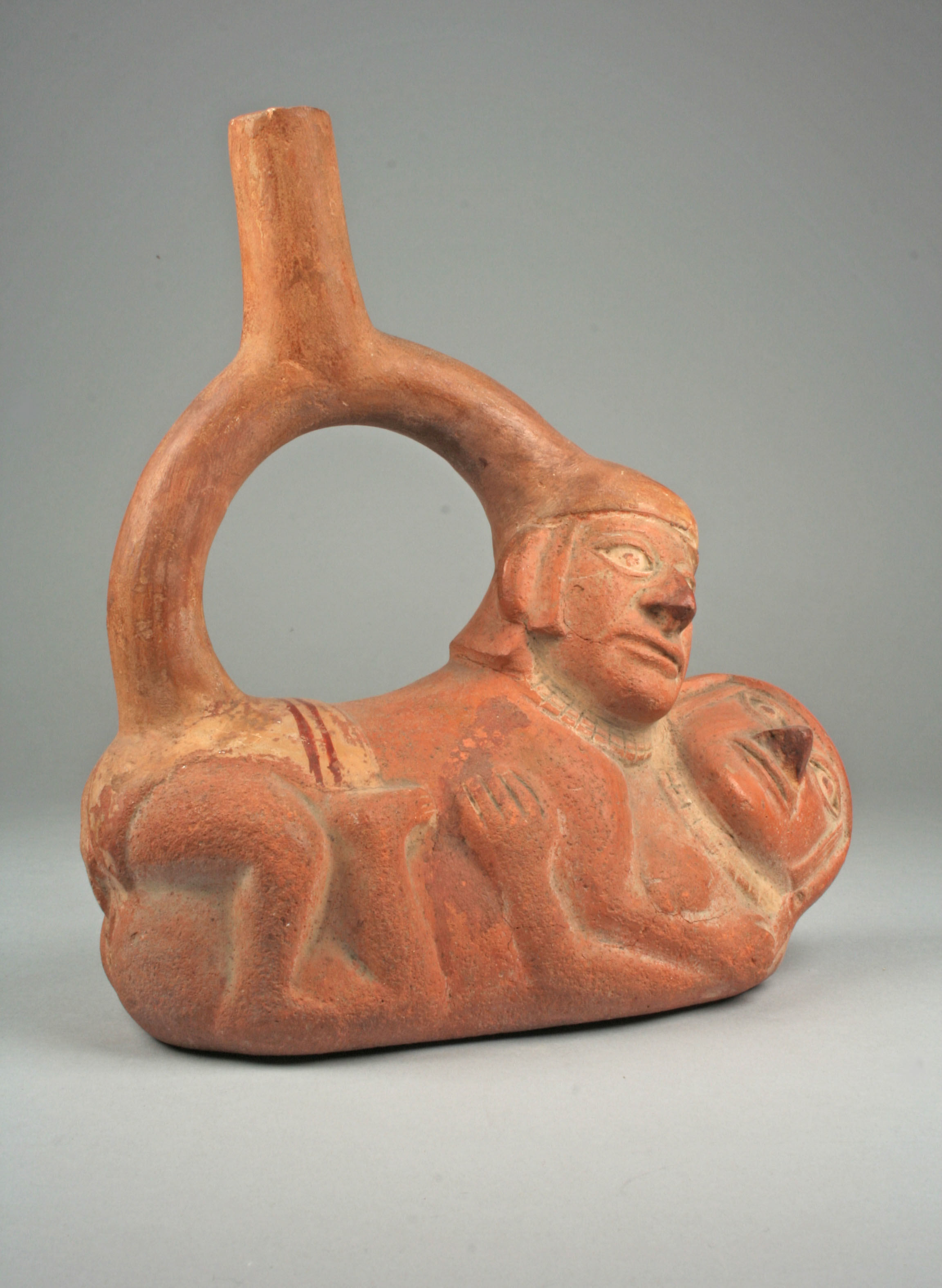
Ceramic vessel. Moche, Peru. Metropolitan Museum of Art, New York. 300–600 CE.

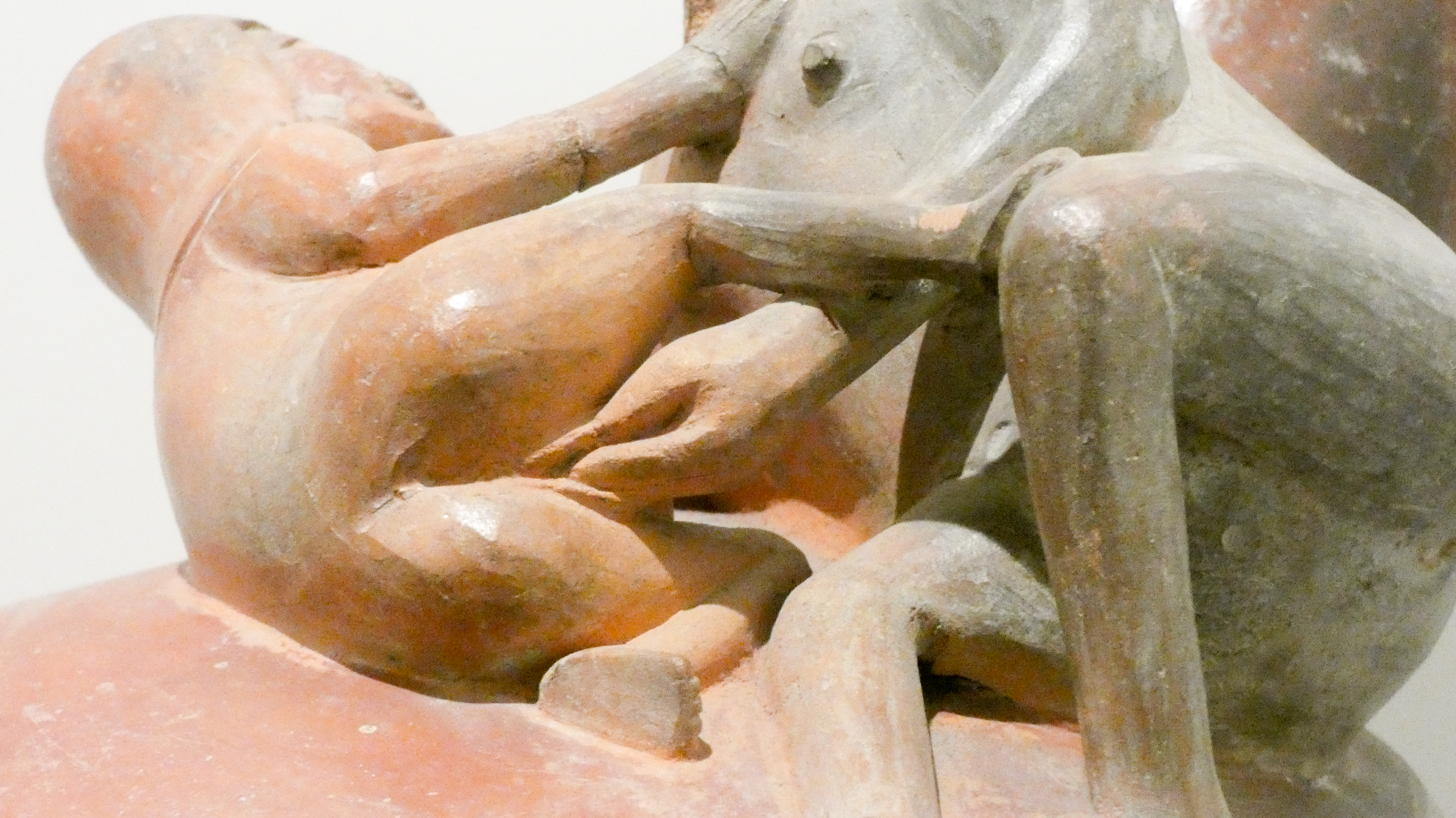
Ceramic vessel. Pre-Columbian. Larco Museum, Lima.

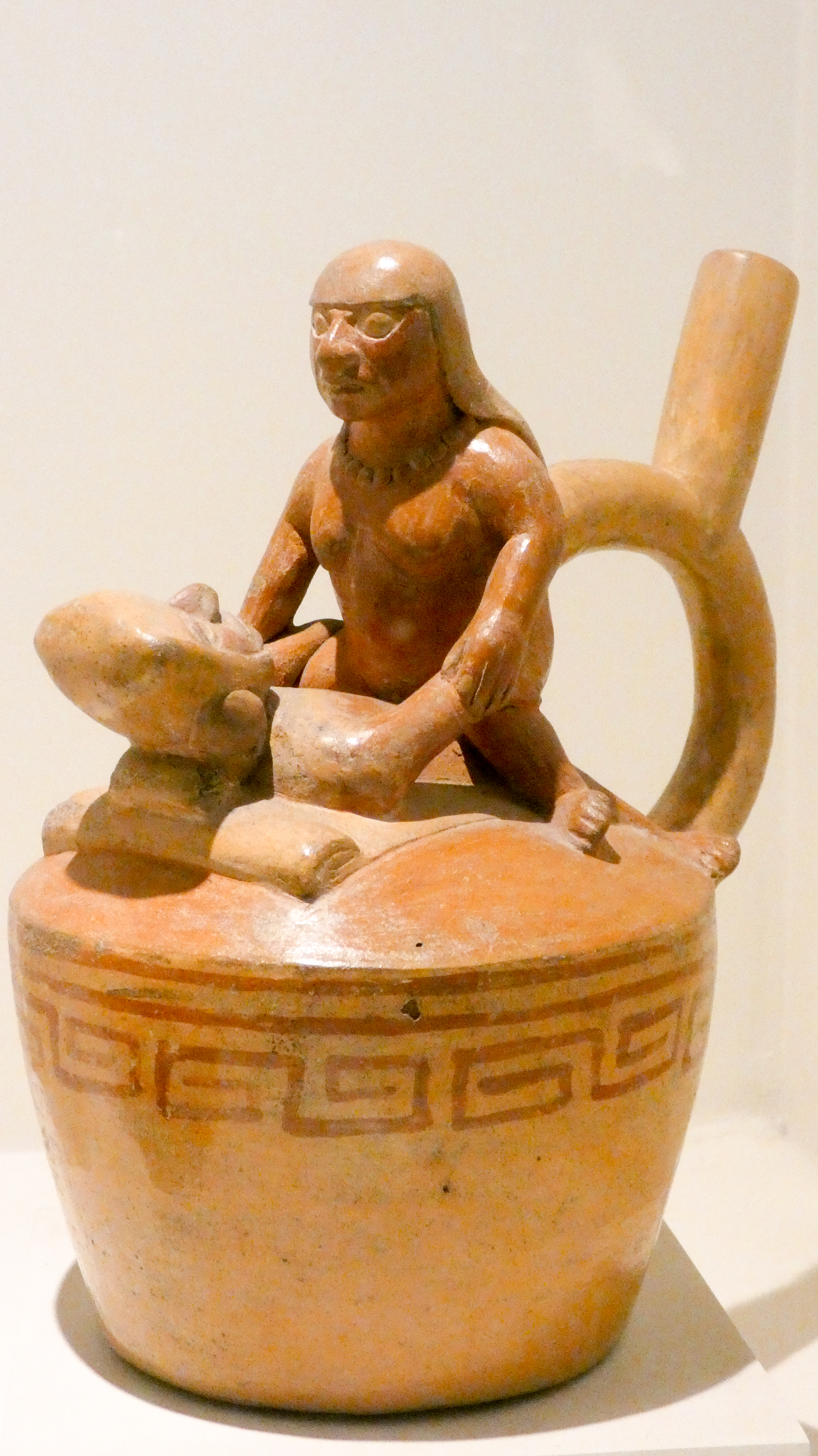
Ceramic vessel. Pre-Columbian. Larco Museum, Lima.

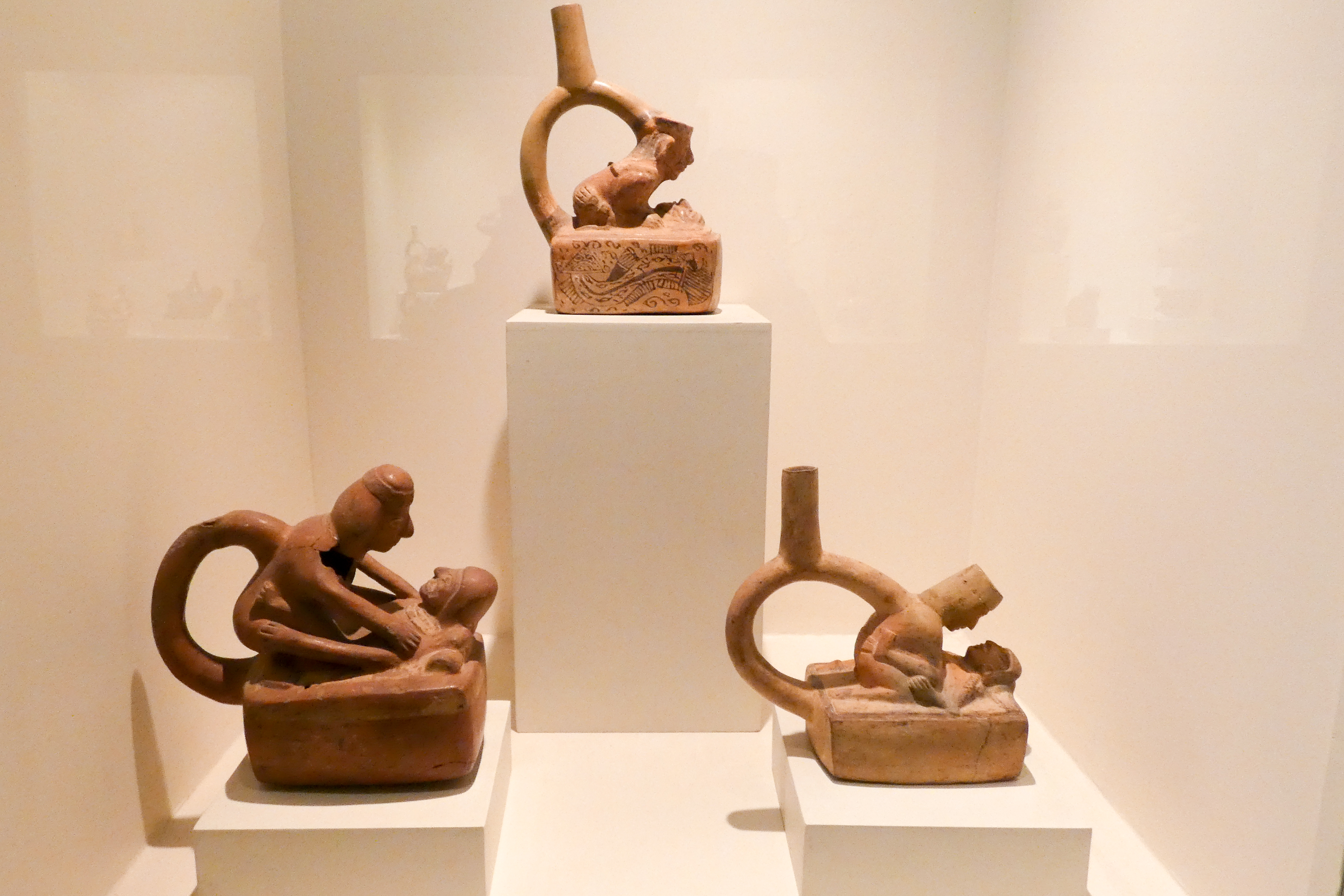
Ceramic vessels. Pre-Columbian. Larco Museum, Lima.

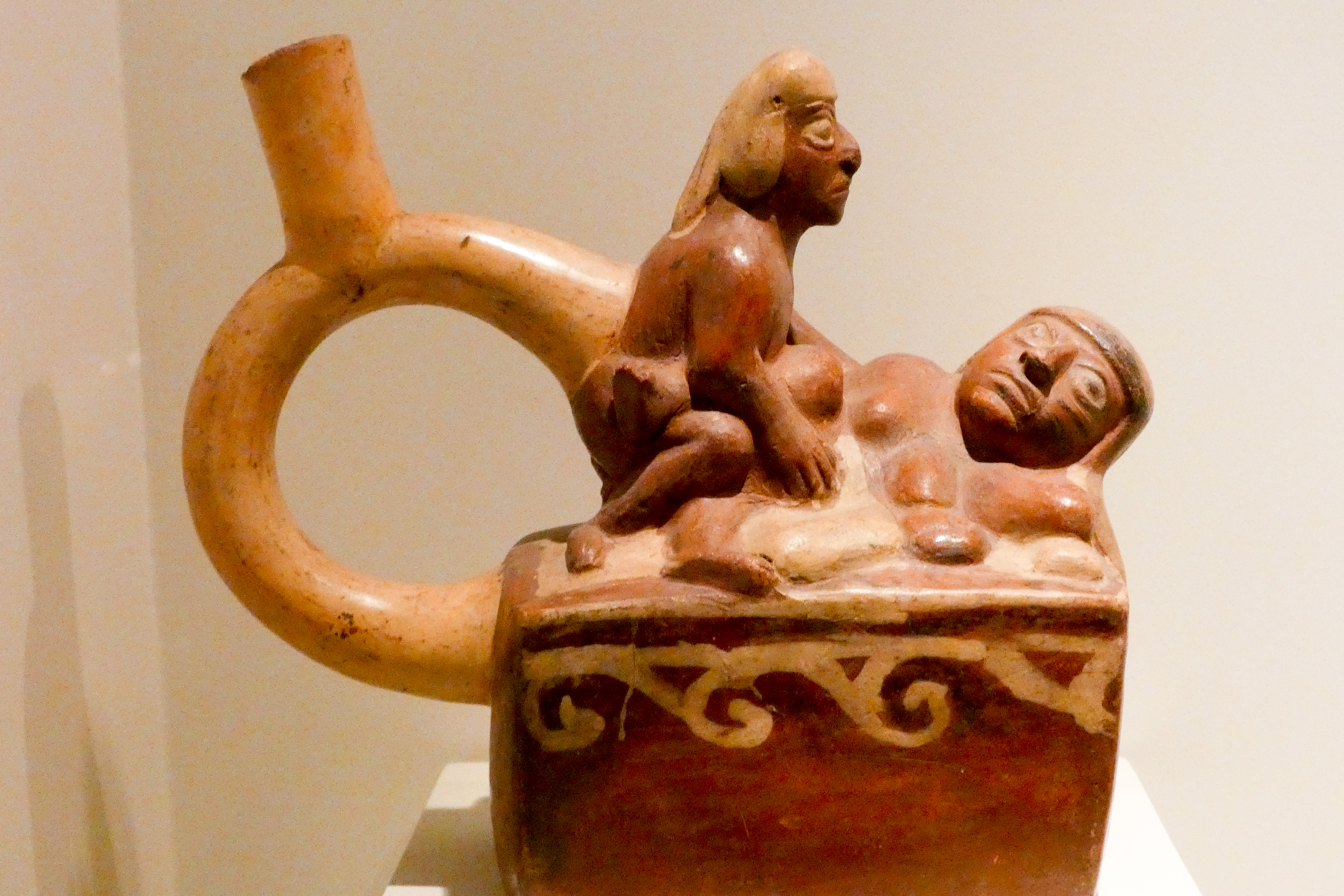
Ceramic vessel. Pre-Columbian. Larco Museum, Lima.

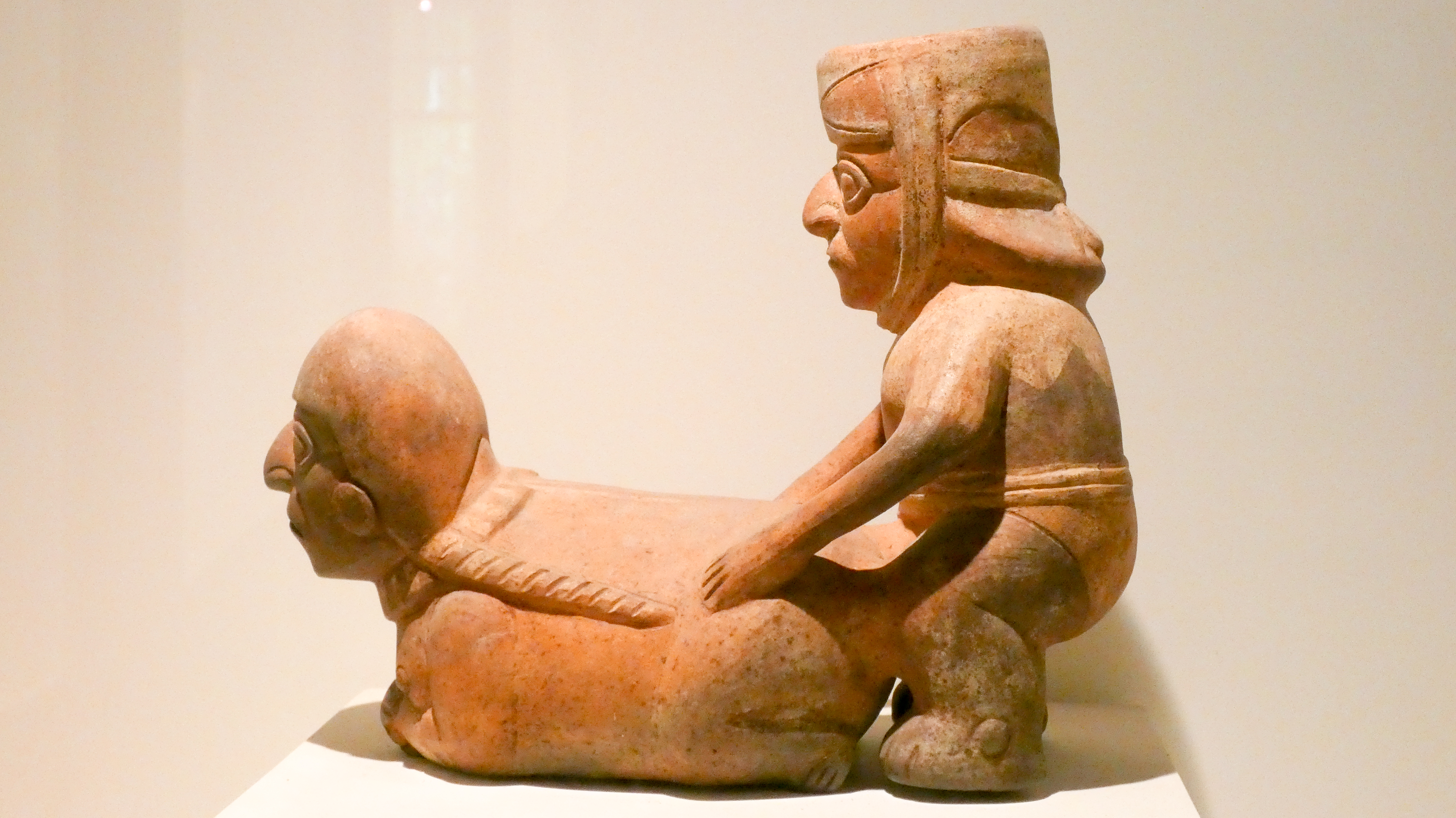
Ceramic vessel. Pre-Columbian. Larco Museum, Lima.

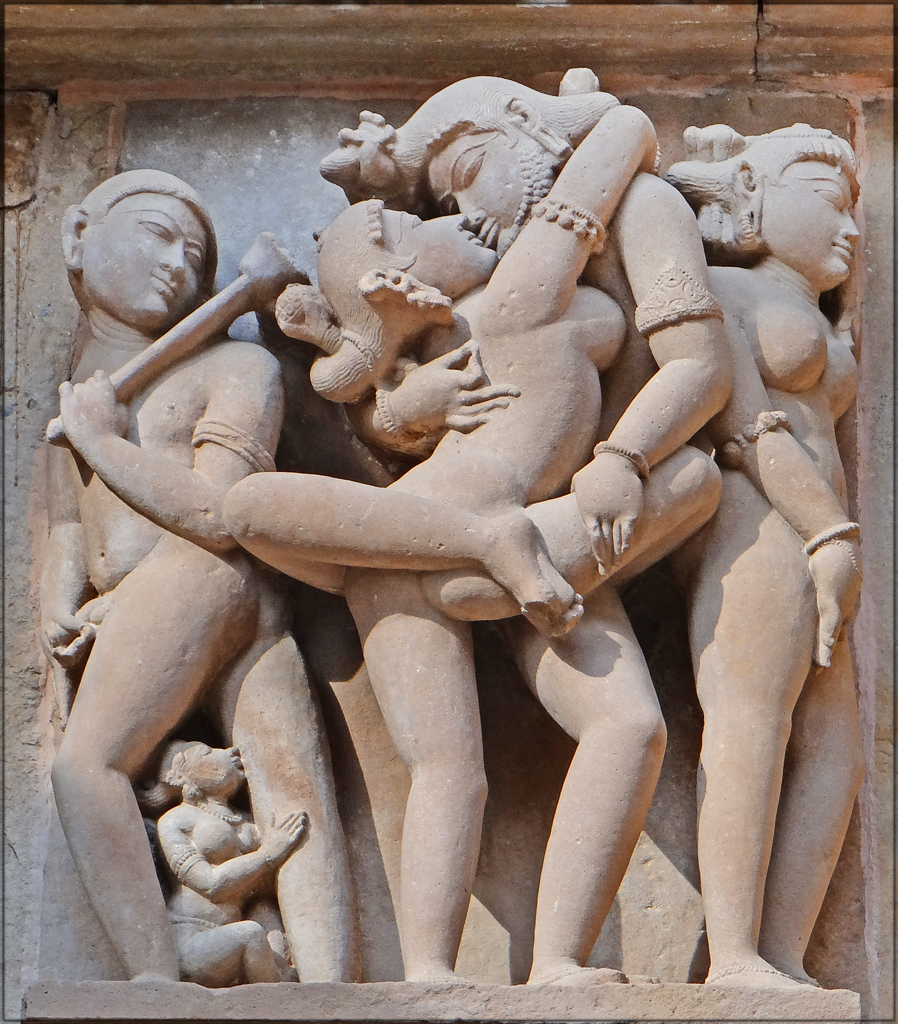
Tantric carving from the Lakshmana Temple, Khajuraho, India

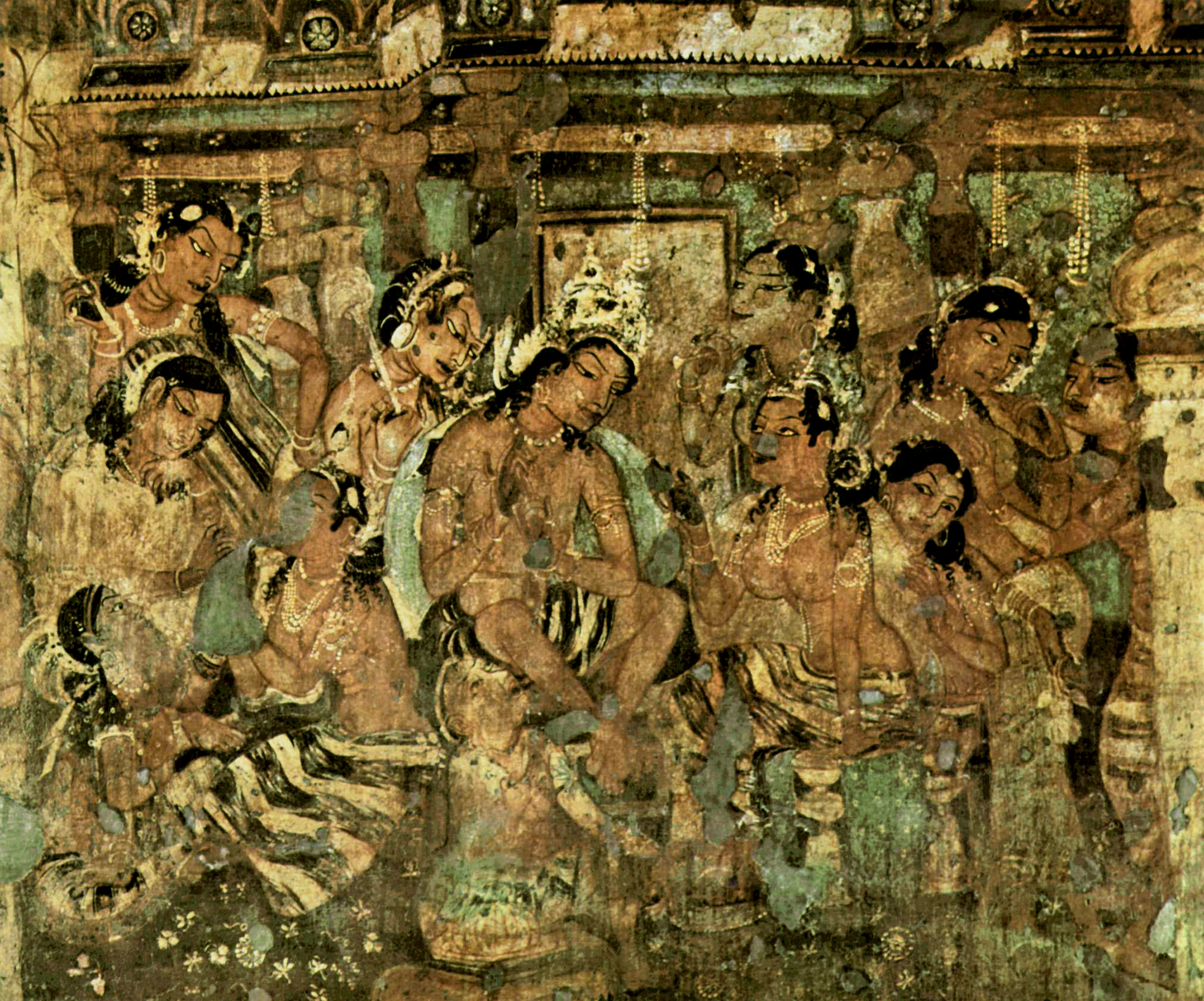
Frescos. Ajanta caves, 6th–7th century CE

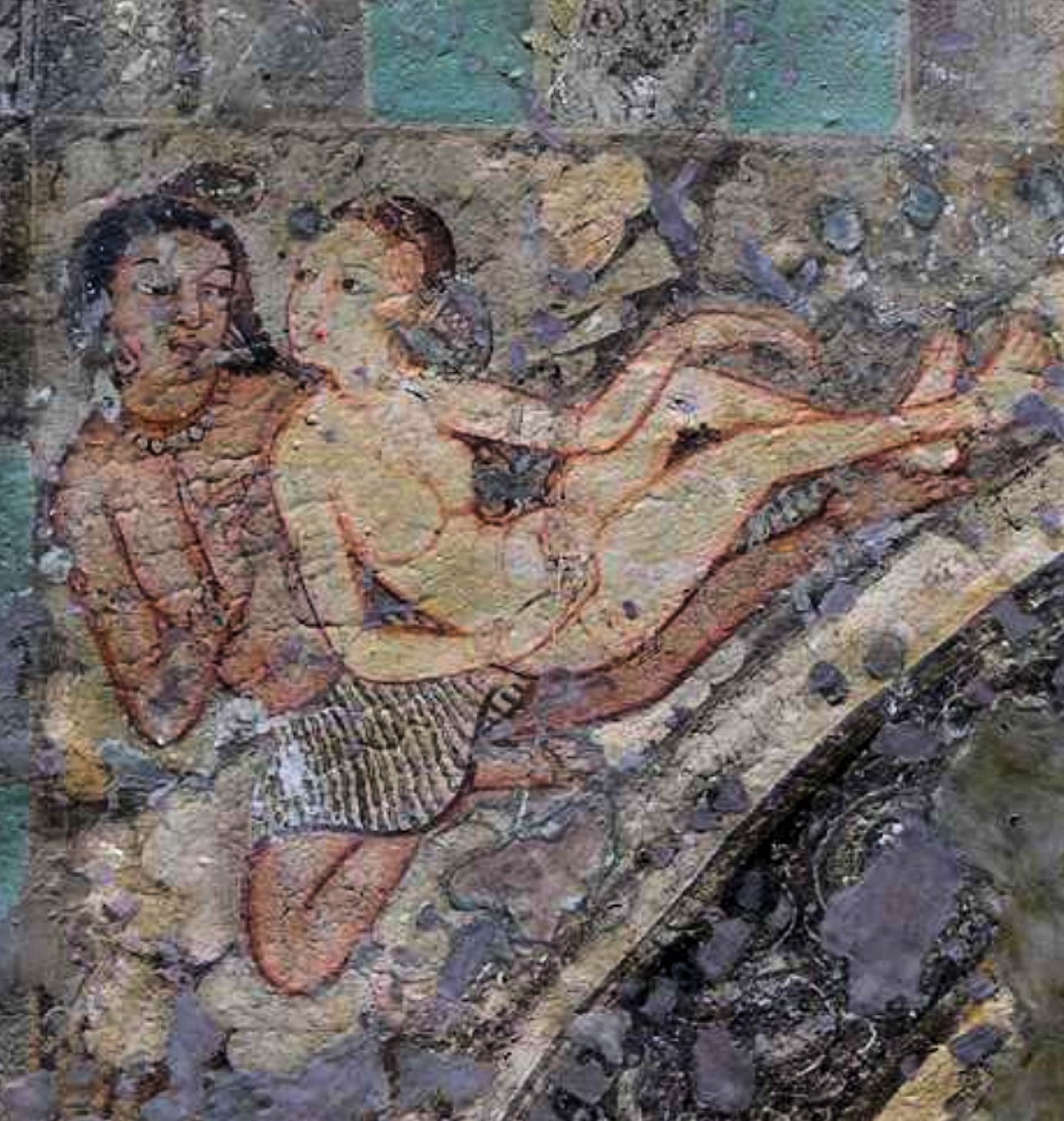
Fresco. Ajanta caves. 6th–7th century CE

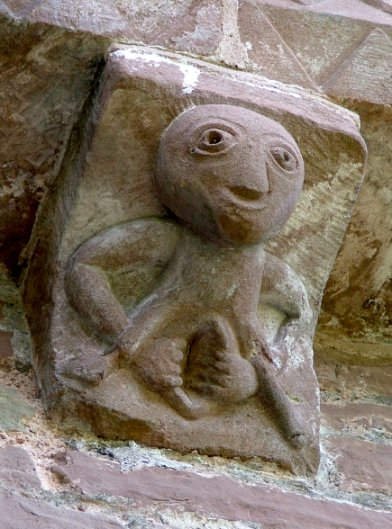
Sheela na Gig at Kilpeck, England, 12th century

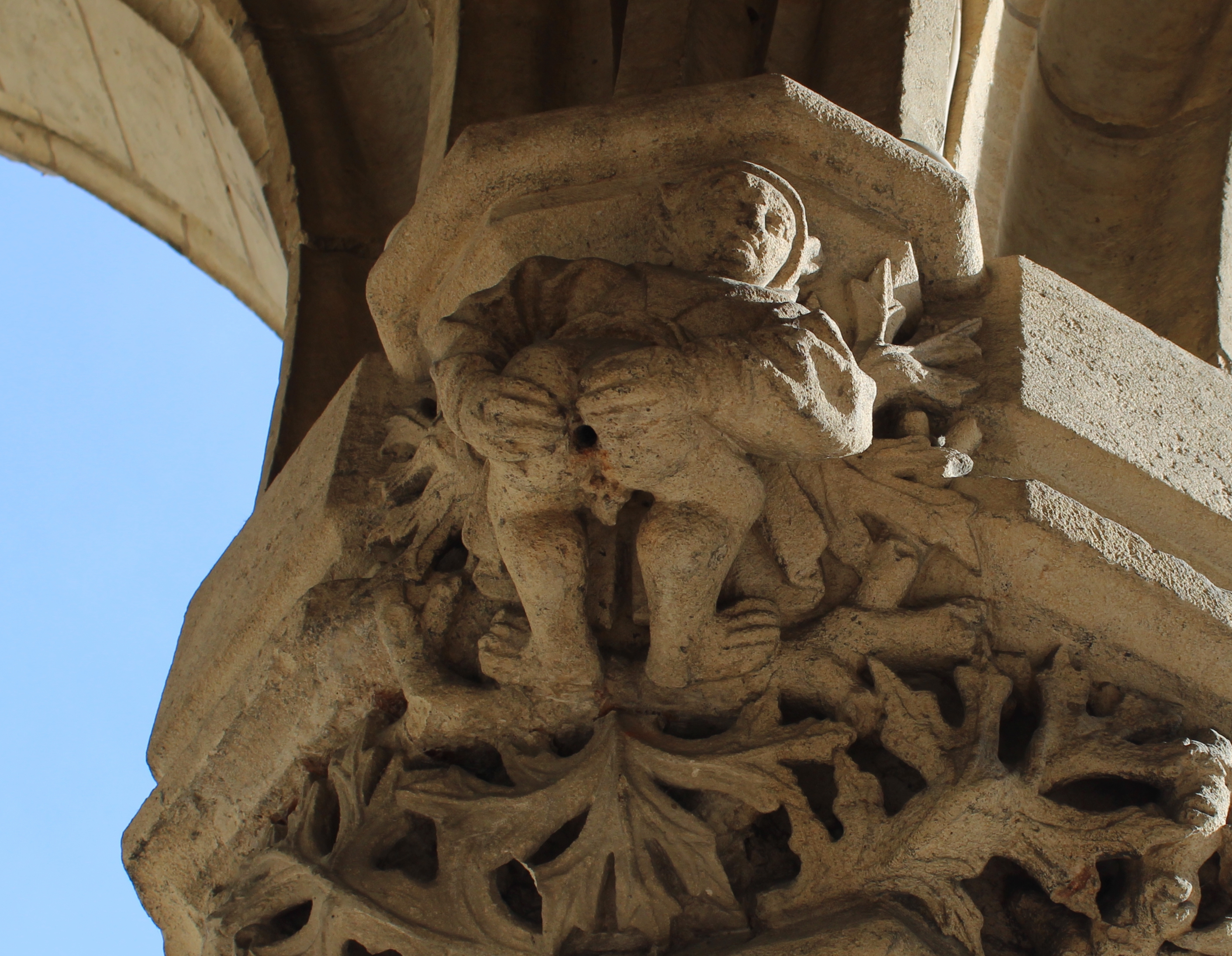
Hôtel-de-Ville de Saint-Quentin. Saint-Quentin, France. Between 1331 to 1509

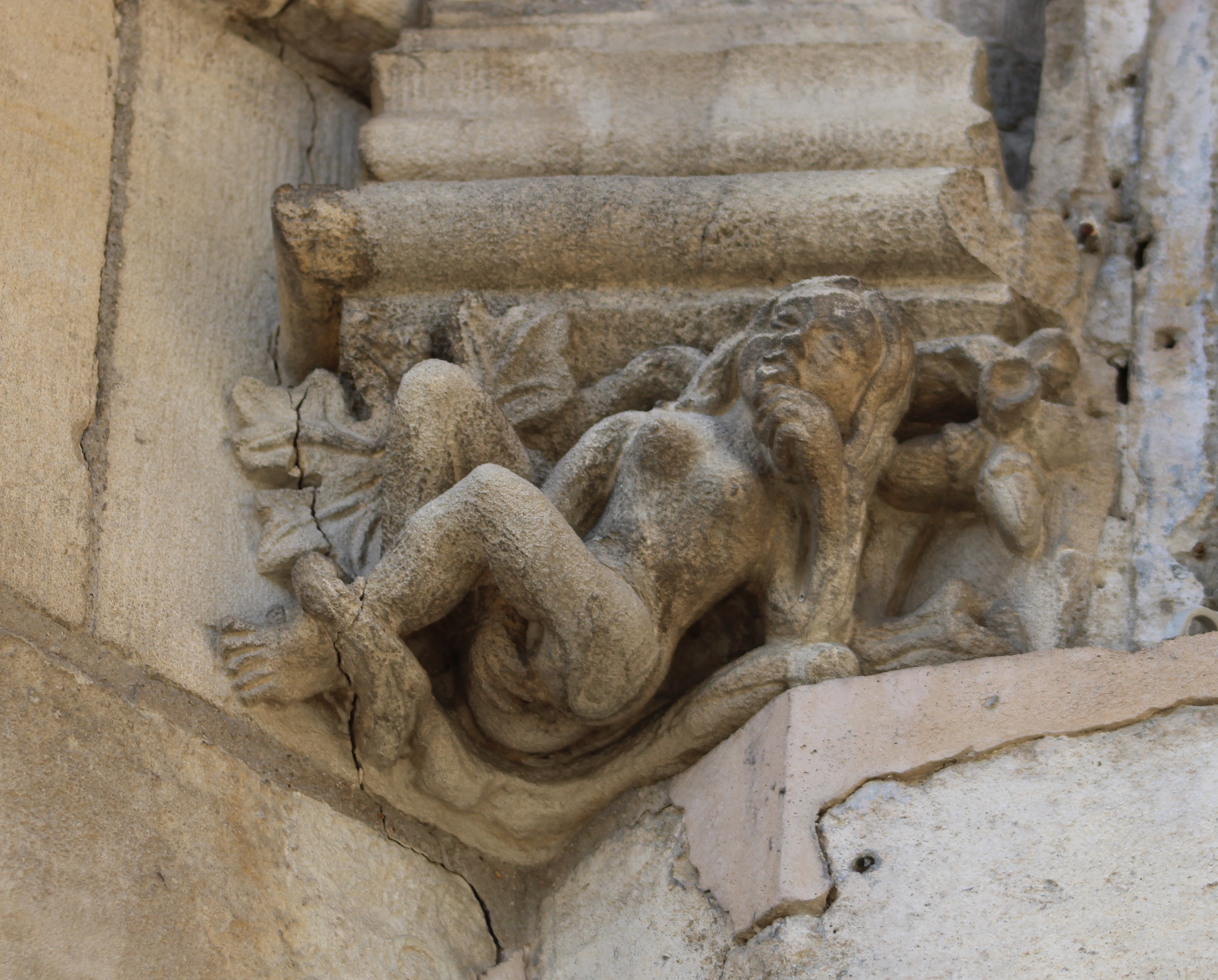
Masturbation. Hôtel-de-Ville de Saint-Quentin. Saint-Quentin, France. Between 1331 to 1509.

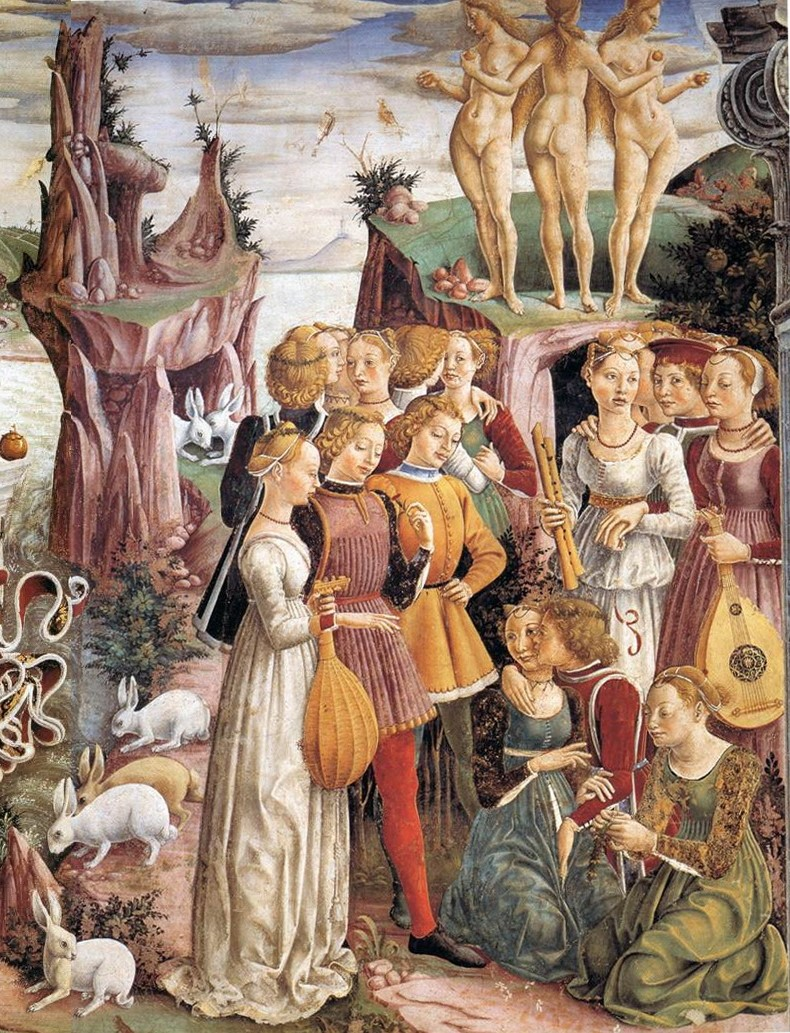
Allegory of April. Francesco del Cossa, Ercole de’ Roberti and Gherardo di Andrea Fiorini. Fresco in the Schifanoia Palace, Ferrara. Around 1469

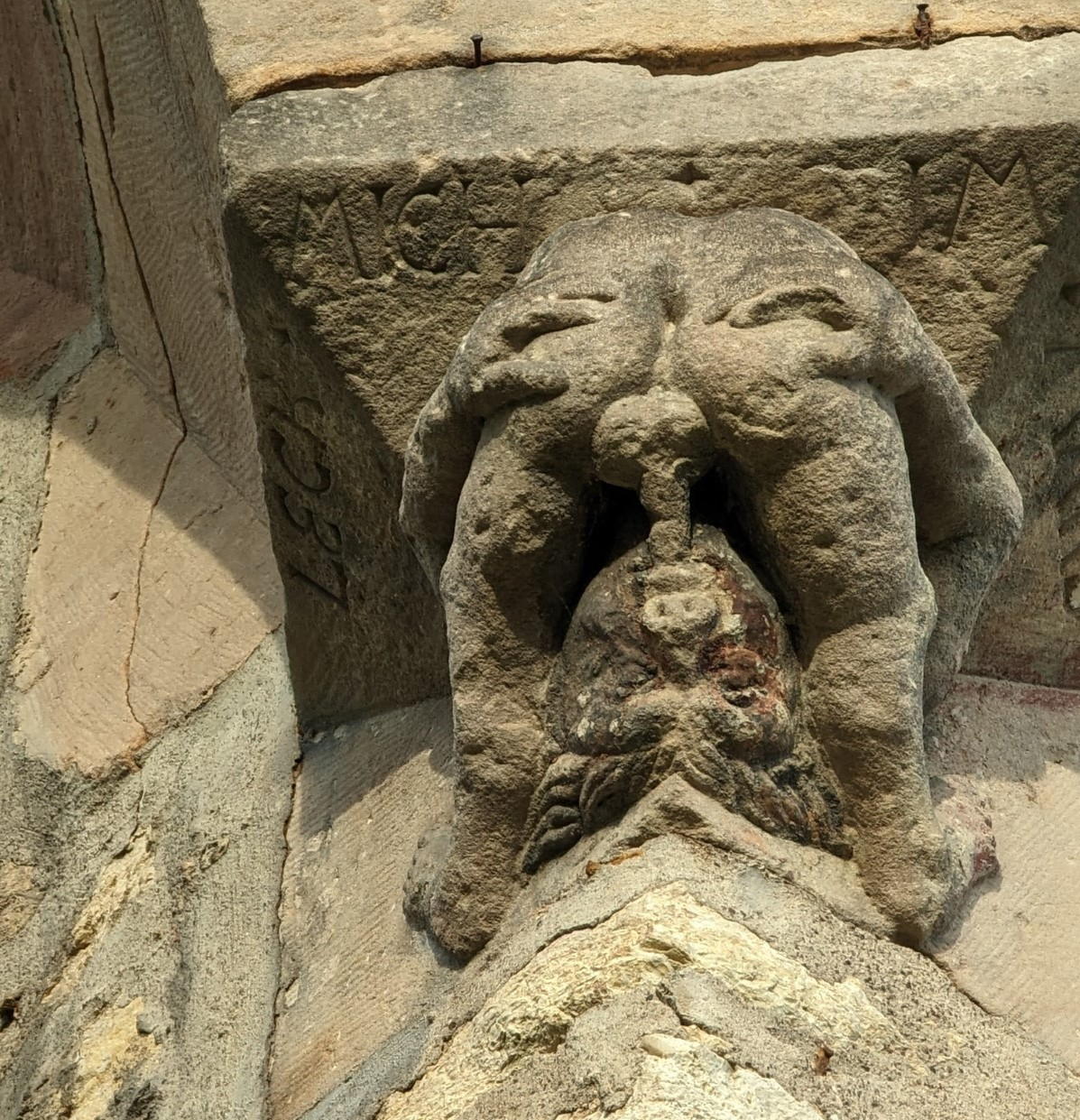
The "Lick ass". Upper castle, Kranichfeld, Thuringia. Around 1530.

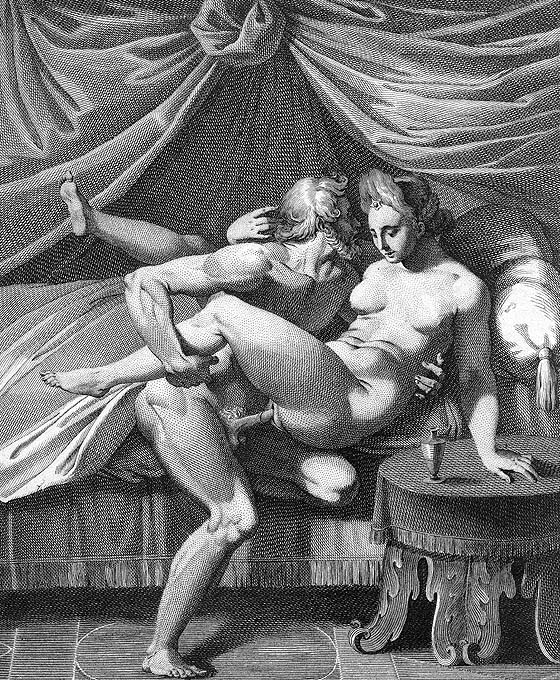
Jupiter and Juno. Jacques Joseph Coiny. 1798.

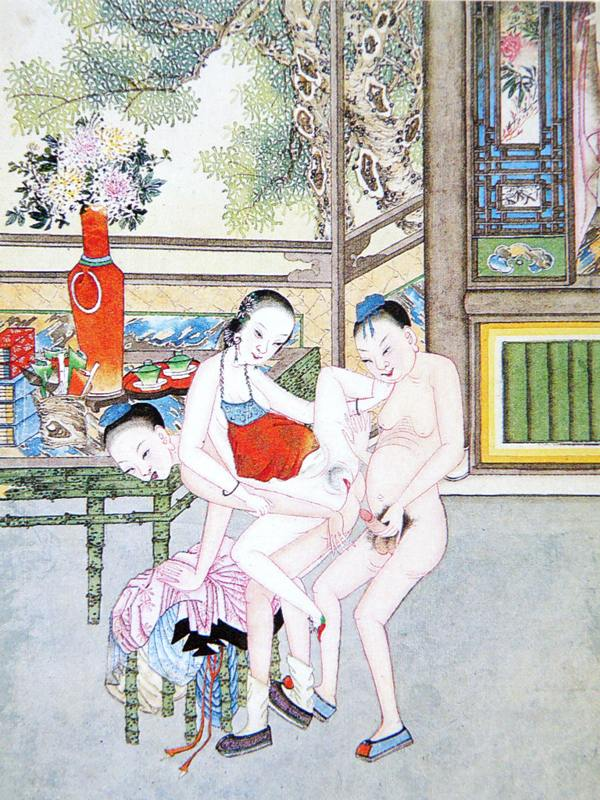
Spring Palace Illustration (also known as Chungongtu,春宮圖). Qing dynasty. 1636–1912.

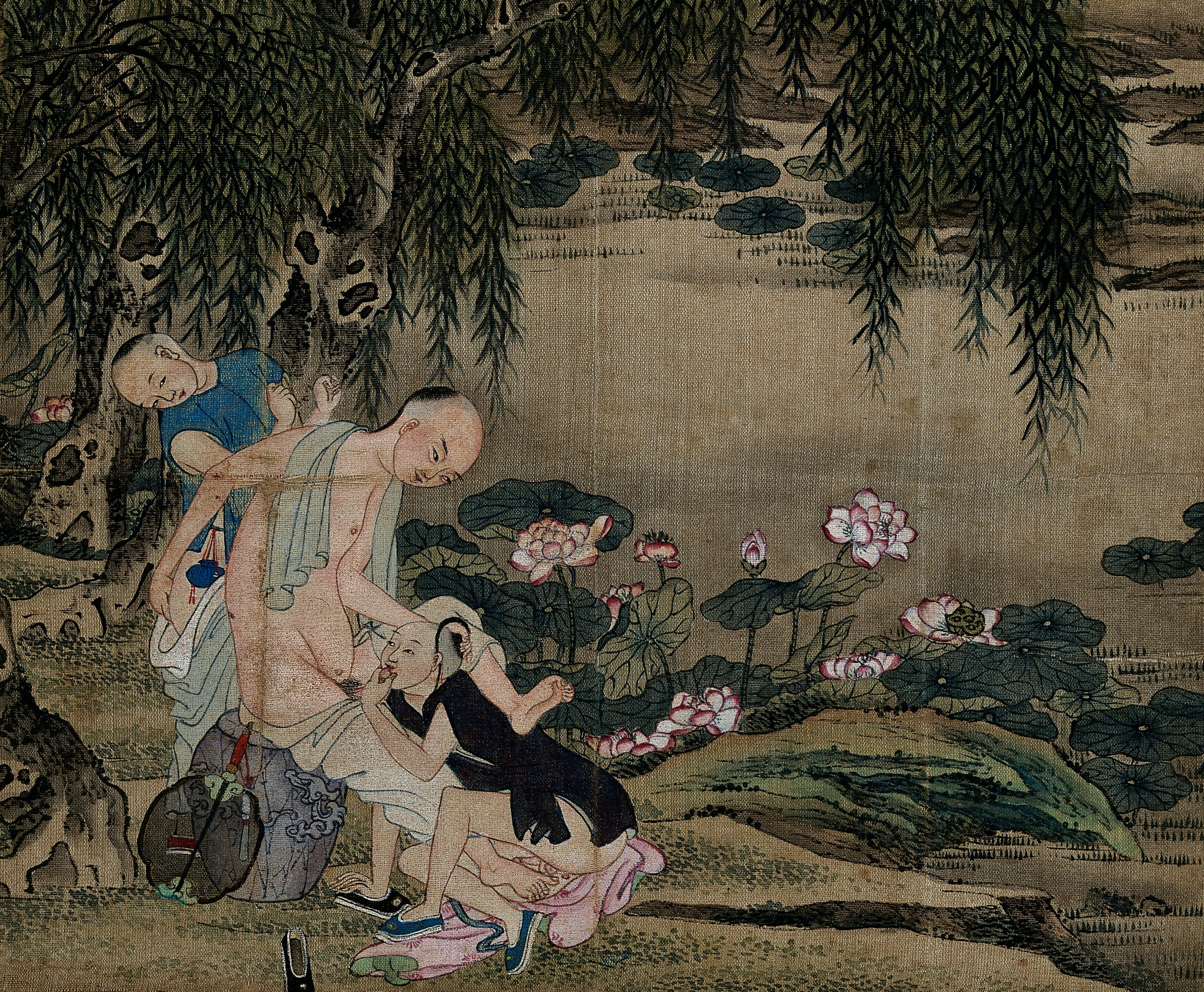
Chinese Erotic Art. Gouache painting. Date of creation uncertain 1800 to 1899.

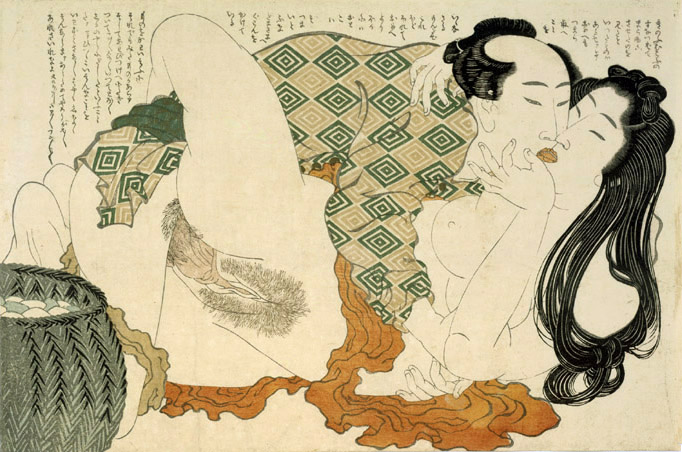
Hokusai, The Adonis Plant (Fukujusō), 1815

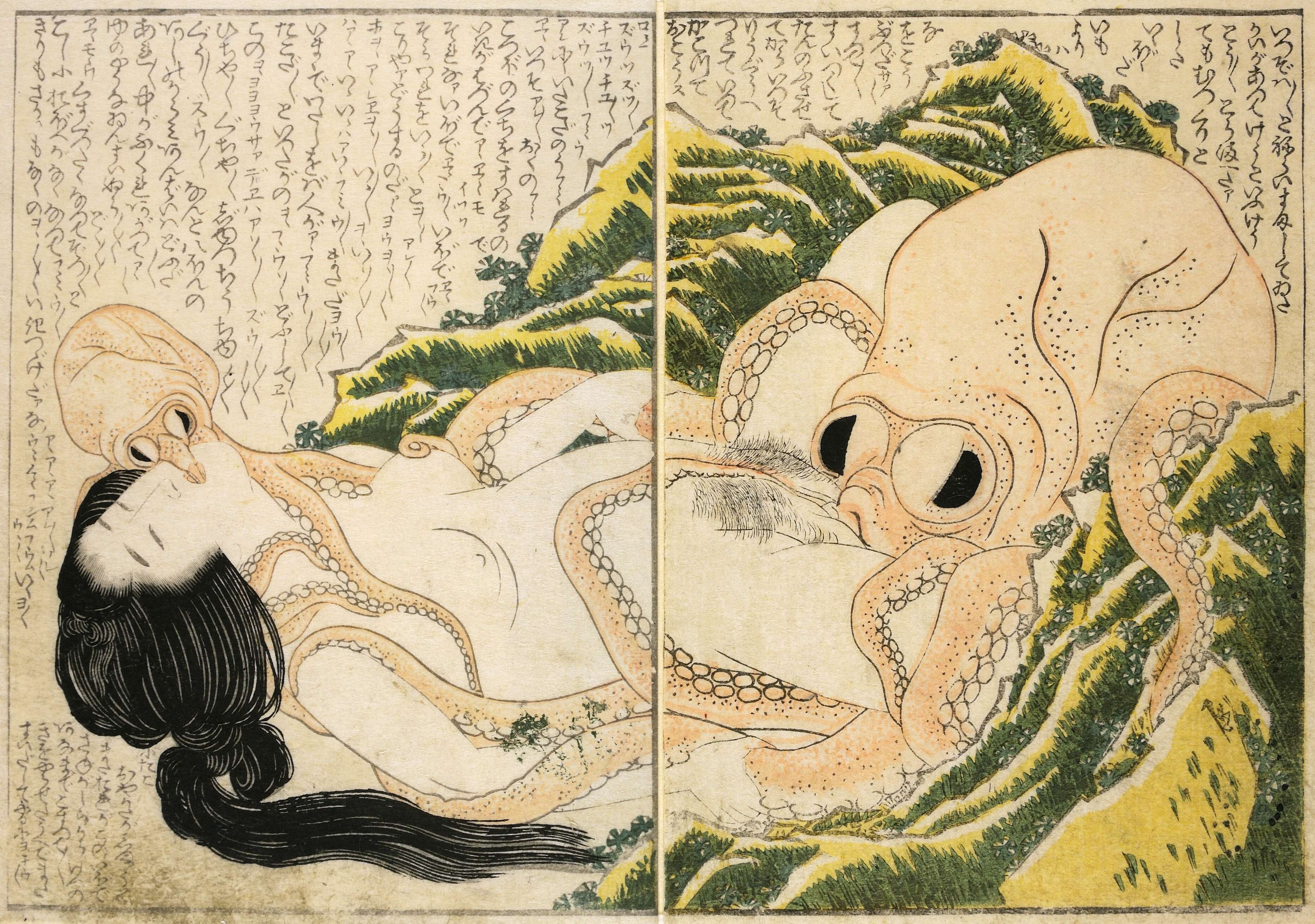
Hokusai, The Dream of the Fisherman's Wife, c. 1820

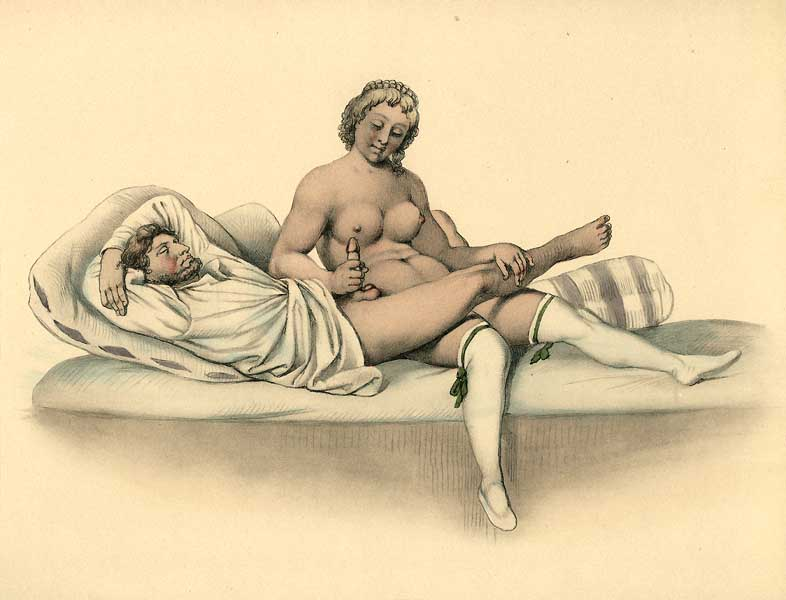
Erotic scene. Watercolour. Peter Johann Nepomuk Geiger. 1840.

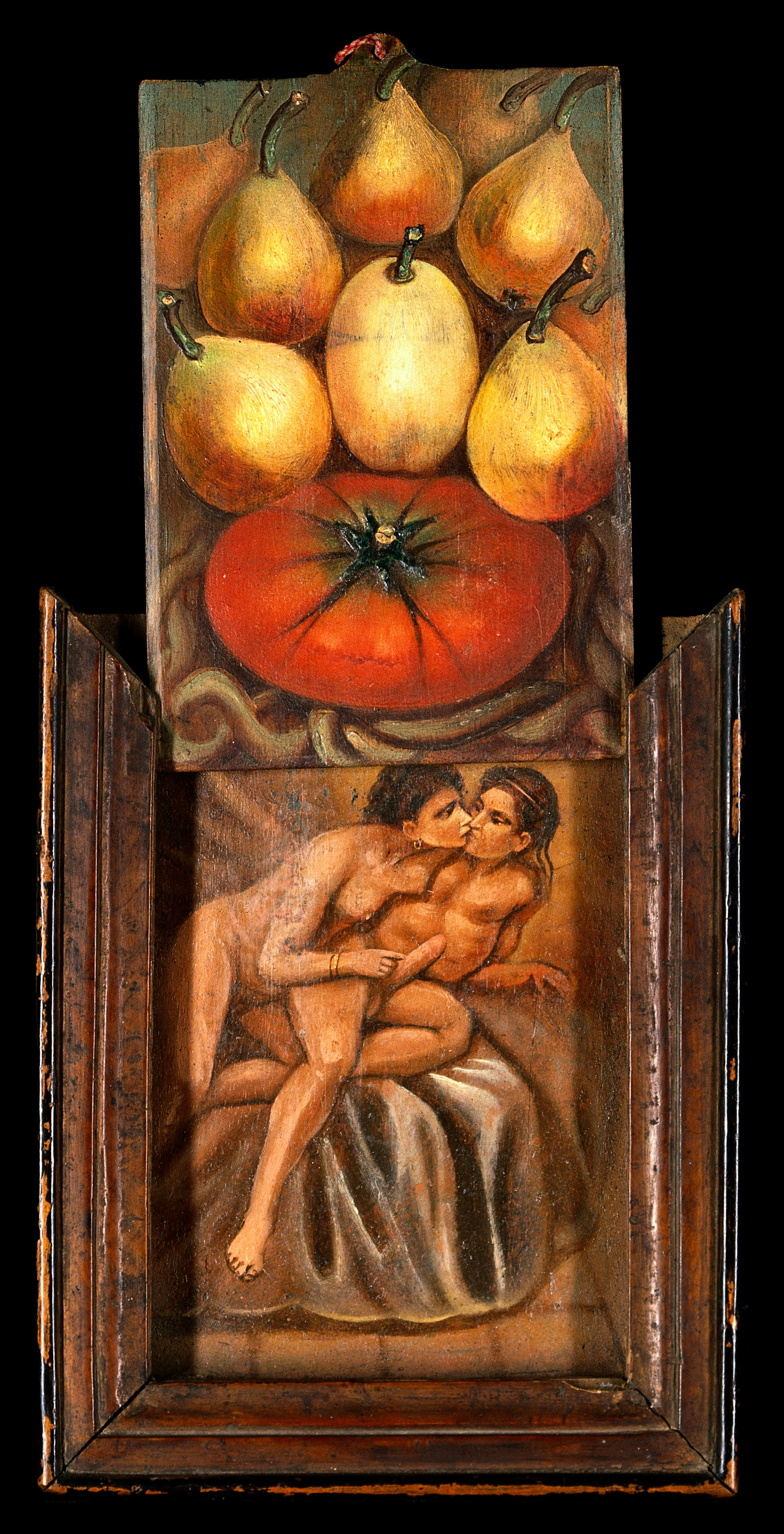
A painting of an erotic scene behind a painting of figs and a tomato. Summonte. 1800 to 1899?

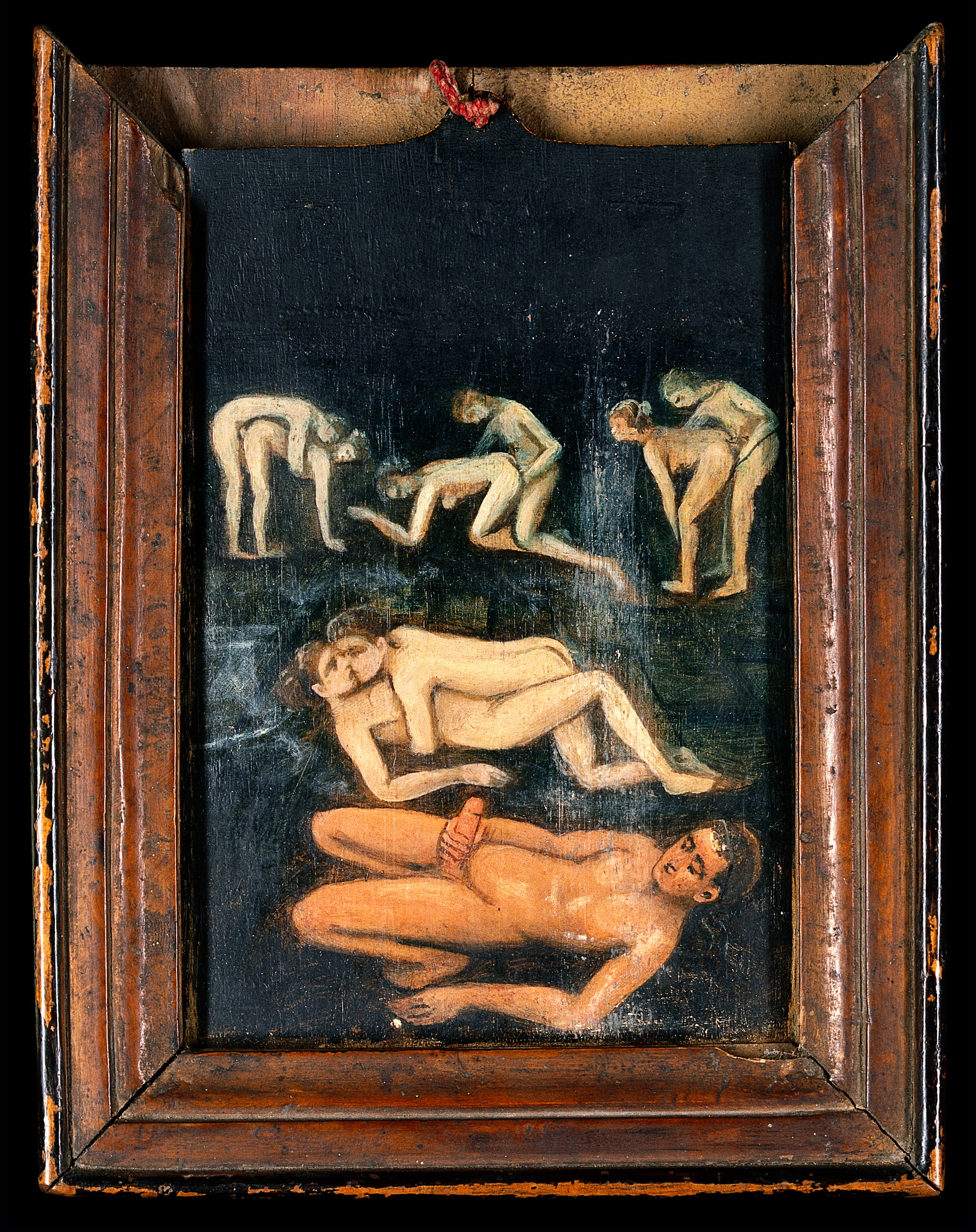
An erotic scene on the reverse side of the painting of figs and a tomato by Summonte. 1800 to 1899?

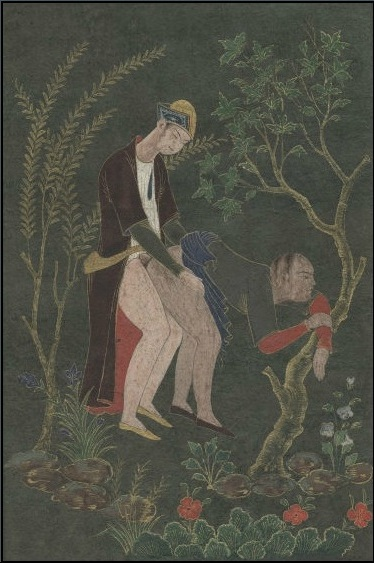
Anal sex between two males. Watercolour on paper. Around 1880 - 1926

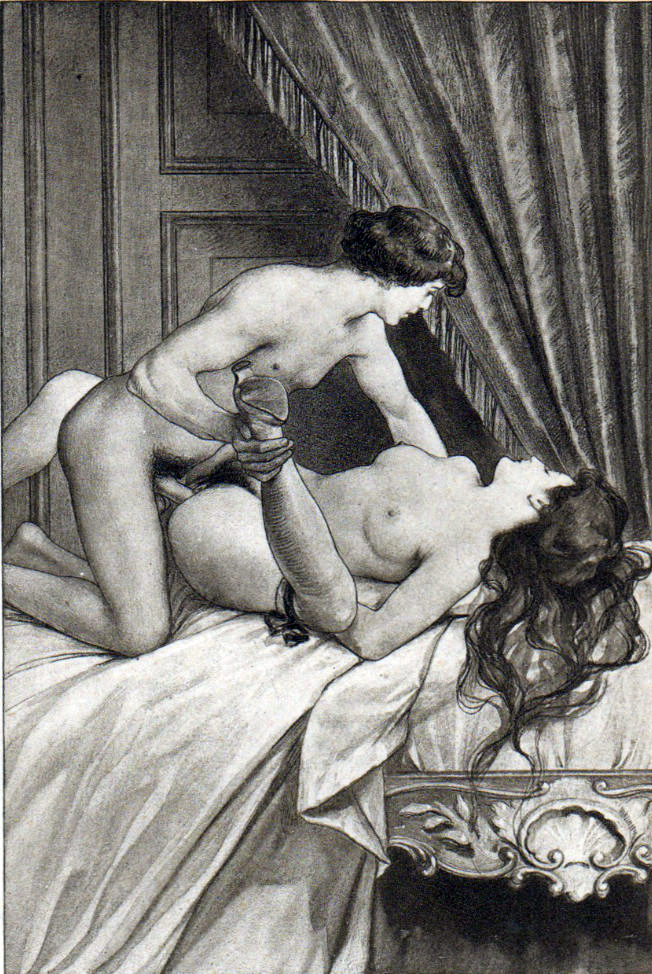
Paul avril, illustration for Fanny Hill, 1907

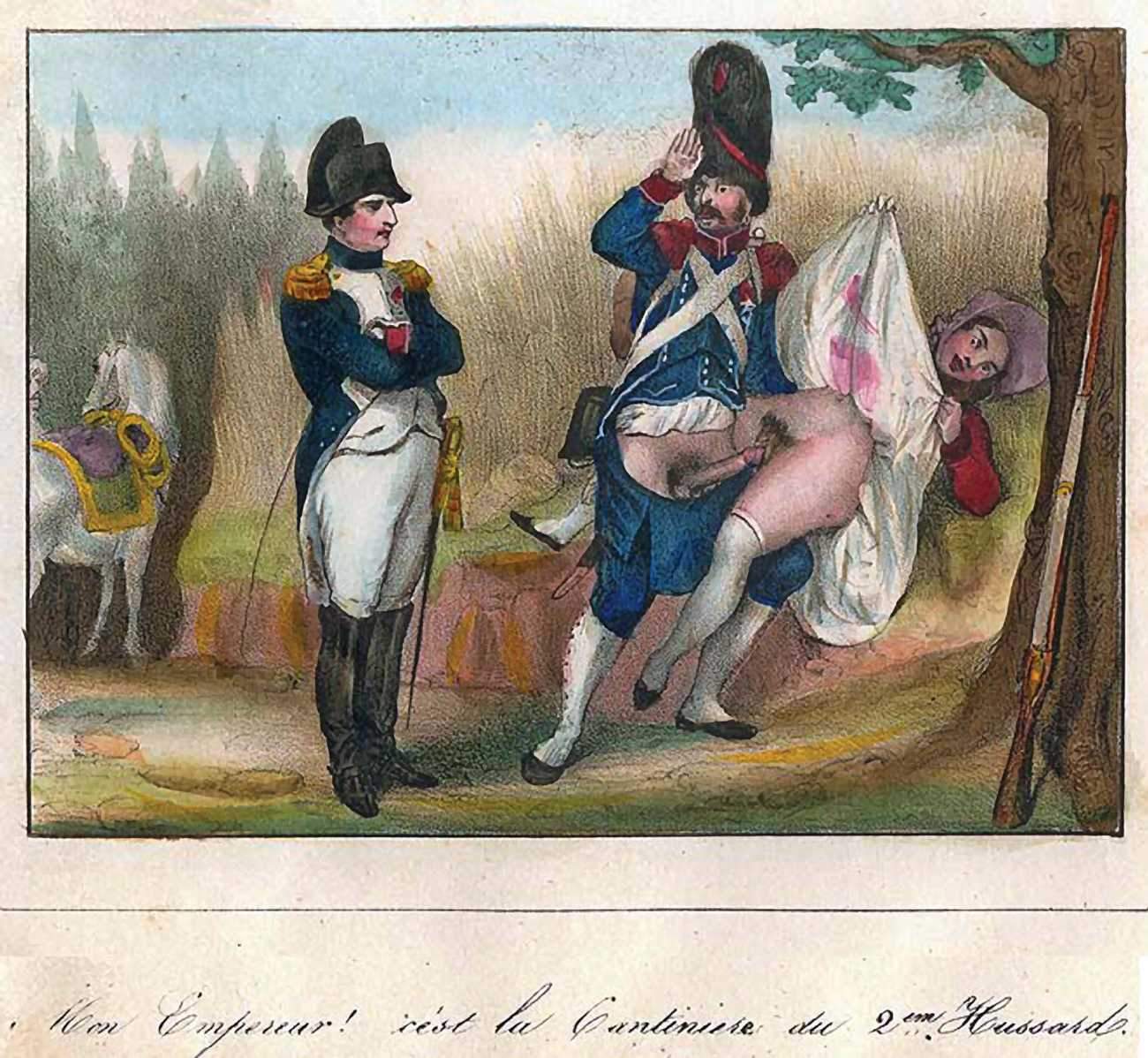
Erotic soldiers by Achille Devéria

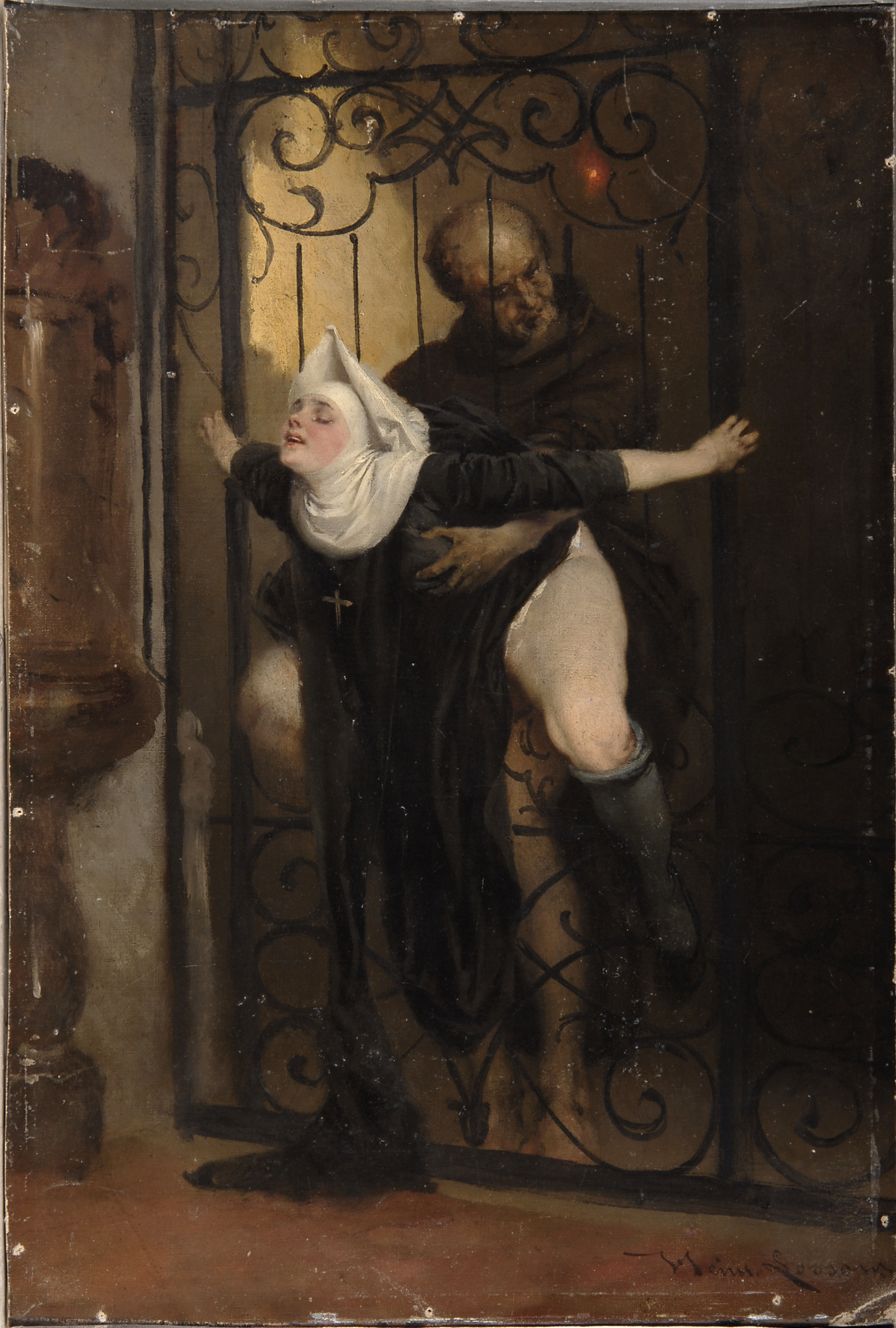
The Sin by Heinrich Lossow, 1880

Gustave Courbet, L'Origine du monde, 1866

== See also ==
- Artistic freedom
- Blue Movie by Andy Warhol
- Dionysism art
- Erotic art in Pompeii and Herculaneum
- Erotic comics
- Erotic photography
- Fantastic art
- Fetish art
- Golden Age of Porn
- Hentai
- History of erotic depictions
- I Modi
- Lesbian erotica
- Nude (art)
- Pin-up model
- Pornography
- Pregnancy in art
- Sex in advertising
- Sex in film
- Sexual arousal
- Yiff
- Zazel
- Khajuraho Group of Monuments
