= Loopflesh/Fleshloop =

EP (split) by Godflesh & Loop
- Released: May 1991
- Genre: Industrial metal; space rock
- Length: 14:13
- Label: Clawfist
- Producer: Godflesh; Loop

Godflesh chronology
Streetcleaner (1989)	Loopflesh/Fleshloop (1991)	Slavestate (1991)

Loop chronology
A Gilded Eternity (1990)	Loopflesh/Fleshloop (1991)	Wolf Flow (The John Peel Sessions (1987–90)) (1991)

Reverse cover

Loopflesh/Fleshloop is a split EP between English industrial metal band Godflesh and English rock band Loop. On side A of the 7-inch vinyl, Loop covers the song "Like Rats" by Godflesh, and on side B, Godflesh covers the song "Straight to Your Heart" by Loop. The palindrome "Rats Live On No Evil Star" appears etched into both sides of the record. Only a thousand copies were pressed.

== Background ==
Both Justin Broadrick of Godflesh and Robert Hampson of Loop were fans of each other's bands before they met. After becoming introduced, Loop invited Godflesh to be opening act on their 1990 tour. It was after that successful string of shows that the bands decided to create Loopflesh/Fleshloop.

Hampson and his bandmates were originally fans of Head of David, in which Broadrick drummed. As such, they were immediately aware of Godflesh and its first album, Streetcleaner. Regarding the album and the song from it that Loop covered, Robert Hampson said:

"We covered 'Like Rats' from Streetcleaner, an album that everyone in Loop was hugely into. That was fun to do–like I said, I never saw Godflesh as a metal band and that comes across in our cover, I think. Just a great song."

Regarding the song that Godflesh chose to cover, Broadrick said:

"'Straight to Your Heart' was the first Loop track I think I ever heard. I remember hearing it with Ben on a Peel session and we were both just like 'holy fuck!' So when it came time to choosing a song to cover, it had to be that one."

After Loop's dissolution in 1991, Hampson became a regular contributor to Godflesh, appearing on Cold World and half of the songs on the band's second album, Pure. In 2014, the two bands reunited and conducted a brief tour together.

== Track listing ==
Side A (Loopflesh)
No.	Title	Length
1.	"Like Rats" (Written by Godflesh, performed by Loop)	6:30

Side B (Fleshloop)
No.	Title	Length
1.	"Straight to Your Heart" (Written by Loop, performed by Godflesh)	7:43

== Personnel ==
Credits adapted from liner notes.

Godflesh

- Justin Broadrick – guitar, vocals, production
- G. C. Green – bass

Loop

- Robert Hampson – guitar, vocals
- Neil MacKay – bass
- Scott Dowson – guitar
- John Wills – drums
