= In All Languages (Godflesh album) =

2001 compilation album by Godflesh

Compilation album by Godflesh
- Released: 24 July 2001
- Recorded: 1988–1999
- Genre: Industrial metal
- Length: 153:05
- Label: Earache
- Producer: Justin Broadrick; G. C. Green

Godflesh chronology
| Us and Them (1999) | In All Languages (2001) | Hymns (2001) |

In All Languages is the first compilation album by English industrial metal band Godflesh, released on 24 July 2001 through Earache Records. It is a double album, and a companion music video DVD was also released in 2001. In All Languages' first disc acts as a greatest hits collection spanning from Godflesh's 1988 self-titled EP to their 1999 studio album, Us and Them. The second disc compiles rare and unreleased tracks.

== Background and content ==
In All Languages was released on 24 July 2001, thirteen years after the formation of Godflesh. Godflesh would disband one year later, only to reform in 2010.

"Witchhunt (Tyrant Remix)"
"Witchhunt (Tyrant Remix)", a song unique to this release, shows Godflesh's hip hop experimentation.

The first disc of the album features tracks from the band's first seven major releases (five full-length albums and two mini-albums). Disc two is a collection of more obscure songs, featuring B-sides, extended mixes, and two tracks from the band's BBC session. Two songs from the never-released Us and Them in Dub remix album also appear on the second disc. Ultimately, the two BBC session songs and two Us and Them in Dub songs were the only songs that were previously unreleased officially up to that point. The day of the release of In All Languages, a music video DVD of the same name was also released. It features videos for "Crush My Soul", "Mothra", "Slavestate", "Christbait Rising", and "Avalanche Master Song".

In a 2009 retrospective interview, Godflesh frontman Justin Broadrick proved dissatisfied with In All Languages, saying, "[it] didn’t succeed too well. I was still learning about self-mastering at that time. I wouldn’t say I was satisfied at all with the results a short time after and since."

Although two songs from Godflesh's 1989 BBC session were included on In All Languages, four songs were performed in actuality. In 2014, Earache Records released a compilation titled The Earache Peel Sessions, which combined Godflesh's 1989 BBC session with Carcass's 1988 and 1990 BBC sessions.

== Critical reception ==
Professional ratings
Review scores
| Source | Rating |
|---|---|
| AllMusic | 4.5/5 stars |
| Kerrang! | 4/5 stars |

Eduardo Rivadavia from AllMusic called In All Languages a "near-perfect career synthesis". He praised the inclusion of the tracks of the second disc which, according to him, "become especially relevant for a full appreciation of the band" and are "[a] great place to start discovering Godflesh". His only regret was that it couldn't feature songs from the band's then-forthcoming record, Hymns (2001).

== Track listing ==
All lyrics written by Justin Broadrick and G.C. Green.

Disc one: Flesh of God
| No. | Title | Source | Length |
|---|---|---|---|
| 1. | "Avalanche Master Song" | Godflesh, 1988 | 5:14 |
| 2. | "Like Rats" | Streetcleaner, 1989 | 4:13 |
| 3. | "Streetcleaner" | Streetcleaner, 1989 | 6:05 |
| 4. | "Slateman" | Slavestate, 1991 (Note: Also released as a standalone single around the same time.) | 5:59 |
| 5. | "Slavestate" | Slavestate, 1991 | 3:58 |
| 6. | "Mothra" | Pure, 1992 | 4:33 |
| 7. | "Spite" | Pure, 1992 | 4:32 |
| 8. | "Pure" | Pure, 1992 | 5:04 |
| 9. | "Xnoybis" | Selfless, 1994 | 5:18 |
| 10. | "Crush My Soul" | Selfless, 1994 | 4:28 |
| 11. | "Anything Is Mine" | Selfless, 1994 | 4:01 |
| 12. | "Circle of Shit" | Songs of Love and Hate, 1996 | 4:55 |
| 13. | "Frail" | Songs of Love and Hate, 1996 | 5:27 |
| 14. | "I, Me, Mine" | Us and Them, 1999 | 5:16 |
| 15. | "The Internal" | Us and Them, 1999 | 5:50 |
| Total length: | | | 74:53 |

Disc two: Beyond the Flesh
| No. | Title | Source | Length |
|---|---|---|---|
| 1. | "Love Is a Dog from Hell" | Pathological Compilation, 1989 | 8:16 |
| 2. | "Crush My Soul" (Ultramixedit) | "Crush My Soul", 1995 | 8:10 |
| 3. | "Flowers" | Merciless, 1994 | 7:37 |
| 4. | "Tiny Tears" (BBC Session) | Peel Session, 1989 (Note: Although recorded and aired in 1989, the BBC session was not officially released on any physical media by 2001.) | 3:10 |
| 5. | "Pulp" (BBC Session) | Peel Session, 1989 | 6:10 |
| 6. | "Newspite" | Corporate Rock Wars, 1994 | 4:27 |
| 7. | "Empyreal 2" | Rareache, 1995 | 5:15 |
| 8. | "Blind" | Merciless, 1994 | 7:18 |
| 9. | "Slavestate" (Radio Slave) | Slavestate Remixes, 1991 (Note: Also released on Slavestate around the same time.) | 4:58 |
| 10. | "Gift from Heaven" (Breakbeat) | Love and Hate in Dub, 1997 | 5:57 |
| 11. | "Xnoybis" (Clubdubedit) | "Xnoybis", 1994 | 6:19 |
| 12. | "Witchhunt" (Tyrant Remix) | Us and Them in Dub, 1999 (Note: The release of Us and Them in Dub was ultimately cancelled, and thus the song was previously unreleased by 2001.) | 5:12 |
| 13. | "Us and Them" (Defensive Remix) | Us and Them in Dub, 1999 | 5:23 |
| Total length: | | | 78:12 |

== DVD ==
In All Languages

Video by Godflesh
- Released: 2001
- Recorded: 1988–1994
- Genre: Industrial metal
- Length: 24:48
- Label: Earache
- Director: Various

Alongside the CD, In All Languages was accompanied with a separate DVD release featuring the same artwork. The DVD version is composed of the band's five music videos, most of which were not previously available to the public. Inside the DVD is a user manual explaining the band's direct involvement with and approval of all the videos.

=== Music videos ===
Unlike the other videos featured on In All Languages, "Avalanche Master Song" was created by three fans: Jack Sargent, Julian Weaver, and Stephanie Watson. After following the band Head of David, Sargent, Weaver and Watson decided pursue the drummer's, Broadrick's, career and film various shows of his new project, Godflesh. The video comprises these bootleg recordings interspersed with heavily distorted shots of industrial machinery. The live footage is the earliest known of Godflesh performing, as it was taken from their first public show in Brixton, London.

The music video for "Christbait Rising" is a compilation of live recordings from the band's 1989 tour opening for Loop. The music being performed does not match up with the track itself. The audio fades out, cutting away a minute and a half of the song.

Robert Garfield directed the music video for "Slavestate" in Hyde Park, London. Released in 1991, the video is abstract and features a number of distorted shots of Broadrick and previous Godflesh album covers.

Barry Maguire directed the music video for "Mothra" in 1992. It combines shots of the band performing in a rundown disco with strange images of animals and suited men.

Godflesh's most noteworthy video is for their song "Crush My Soul." It was directed by Andres Serrano and garnered some controversy for its portrayal of violence and religious imagery.

=== Track listing ===
| No. | Title | Director | Length |
|---|---|---|---|
| 1. | "Crush My Soul" | Andres Serrano | 5:01 |
| 2. | "Mothra" | Barry Maguire | 4:47 |
| 3. | "Slavestate" | Howard Garfield | 4:06 |
| 4. | "Christbait Rising" | Godflesh | 5:27 |
| 5. | "Avalanche Master Song" | Jack Sargent, Julian Weaver, Stephanie Watson | 5:27 |
| Total length: | | | 24:48 |

== Personnel ==
- Justin Broadrick – guitar, vocals, programming, samples, production, remastering
- G. C. Green – bass
- Paul Neville – guitar on "Streetcleaner", "Slateman", and "Slavestate"
- Robert Hampson - guitar on "Spite" and "Flowers"
- Bryan Mantia – drums on "Circle of Shit", "Frail", and "Gift from Heaven (Breakbeat)"
