= Mothra (song) =

Song by Godflesh

Promotional single by Godflesh

from the album Pure
- Released: 1992
- Recorded: September–October 1991
- Genre: Industrial metal
- Length: 4:31
- Label: Relativity
- Songwriter: Justin Broadrick
- Producers: Justin Broadrick; G. C. Green

Godflesh singles chronology
"Slateman" (1991)	"Mothra" (1992)	"Xnoybis" (1995)

Audio sample
- file; help

"Mothra" is a song by English industrial metal band Godflesh. It was taken from their 1992 album Pure and saw release as a radio promo and music video in the same year. The track's title is derived from 1961 Japanese film of the same name by Ishirō Honda. Musically, "Mothra" is a grinding, mechanical song with shouted vocals and heavily distorted instruments.

== Composition ==
"Mothra", the second track on 1992's Pure, is a weighty industrial metal song. Ned Raggett of AllMusic described the track as "surprisingly commercial for the band" and highlighted its "memorable main riff and drumming" as pleasingly listenable; he selected the song as one of his favourites from Pure. Joseph Schafer of Decibel agreed with Raggett, considering "Mothra" one of Godflesh frontman Justin Broadrick's most accessible songs, but added that "it still sounds like getting crushed by a ton of lead". Mike Gitter of Spin and RIP Magazine described hearing "Mothra" by writing, "It's as if your whole body is made to serve as a giant ear, as you are beaten upon by a low-level shock wave. You lose all defenses and filters against the world". He also wrote that the song is "the sound of rock taken to its bleakest and slowest extremes".

As is the case with most Godflesh songs, "Mothra" was recorded with a drum machine, which, according to Shawn Macomber of Decibel, "really hammers the [Steve] Albini vibe" in allusion to the band Big Black. Macomber also recognised "Mothra" as a fan favourite song. Writing for Melody Maker, Sharon O'Connell also noted the song's grinding, deliberate repetition in a favourable light. The Quietus' Noel Gardner wrote that the various machine, guitar and bass elements of "Mothra" seem incongruous from a distance, but in practice they work well. In their book The Trouser Press Guide to '90s Rock, Ira A. Robbins and David Sprague characterise "Mothra" as having a memorable and definite groove.

"Mothra" derives its title from Ishirō Honda's 1961 film Mothra, which features the fictional giant monster Mothra. Some of the song's lyrics are borrowed from "Avalanche" by Leonard Cohen, a track off of his 1970 album Songs of Love and Hate (a title that Godflesh later borrowed).

== Release ==
"Mothra" released as a promotional maxi single in 1992. Though licensed from Earache Records (who, at the time, managed Godflesh), the promo was distributed by Relativity Records. Pure's introductory track, "Spite", it also included on the release as a B-side. "Mothra" is one of the few Godflesh songs to feature a music video. Directed by Barry Maguire in 1992, the video was described by the band as "a curious affair that mixed David Lynch-style cinematography and concepts with performance shots of Godflesh in a dodgy-looking disco".

== Track listing ==
No.	Title	Length
1.	"Mothra"	4:31
2.	"Spite"	4:31
Total length:		9:02

== Personnel ==
Credits adapted from "Mothra" liner notes

- Justin Broadrick – guitar, vocals, engineering, production, rhythm programming
- G. C. Green – bass, engineering, production
- Robert Hampson – guitar (track 2)
