= Life Is Easy =

Studio album by Fall of Because
- Released: 14 August 1999
- Recorded: August 1986 – January 1987
- Studio: RB Studios in Birmingham, England and live at various venues in Birmingham
- Genre: Industrial metal; noise music
- Length: 73:34
- Label: Alleysweeper; Invisible Records
- Producer: Fall of Because

Fall of Because chronology
Extirpate (1986)	Life Is Easy (1999)

Life Is Easy is the first compilation album by English industrial metal band Fall of Because, compiling songs recorded in 1986 and 1987 before the band became Godflesh. Released on 24 August 1999 through Alleysweeper and distributed by Martin Atkins' label Invisible Records, Life Is Easy contains many songs that went on to be rerecorded and turned into Godflesh tracks.

== Background and content ==
"Life Is Easy" (1986)
A clip of "Life Is Easy" by Fall of Because

"Life Is Easy" (1989)
The corresponding clip of "Life Is Easy" from the rerecorded Godflesh version, illustrating the mechanical percussion and slowed tempo

Following the recording of a demo called Extirpate in 1986, Fall of Because disbanded and reformed in 1988 as Godflesh. Life Is Easy incorporates many of those early demo tracks, which were recorded when Justin Broadrick was only sixteen. Dimitri Nasrallah of Exclaim! called Fall of Because's output "eerily ahead of its time".

Released eleven years after Fall of Because turned into Godflesh, Life Is Easy was recorded partially in studio and partially live. The first eight tracks were recorded and mixed at Rich Bitch studios in Birmingham, England in November 1986. Tracks 9, 10, and 11 were recorded live, with the latter two comprising complete Fall of Because shows.

The songs "Devastator" and "Life Is Easy" were rerecorded in 1989 and used in Godflesh's debut studio album, Streetcleaner. "Merciless" was rerecorded in 1994 and became the title track of a Godflesh EP. A segment of the show titled "Xmas Special" appeared as the intro of the Godflesh song "Love, Hate (Slugbaiting)" from their 1992 album Pure. Since Broadrick acted as a physical drummer in Fall of Because, there is notable difference between those early demos and the final Godflesh songs, which employ programmed drum machines and slower, more grinding tempos.

== Track listing ==
All songs written by Justin Broadrick, G. C. Green, and Paul Neville.

No.	Title	Length
1.	"Devastator"	3:18
2.	"Life Is Easy"	3:53
3.	"Middle Amerika"	5:27
4.	"Grind"	4:01
5.	"Ecstacy of Hate"	7:23
6.	"Malewhoreslag"	3:35
7.	"Lifefucker-Shitsucker"	4:55
8.	"Merciless"	4:43
9.	"Survive"	5:17
10.	"Fight Show": 1. "Empire of Lies"; 2. "Whiterock-Blackdeath"; 3. "Christian Motherfucker"; 4. "Ecstacy of Hate"	15:38
11.	"Xmas Special": 1. "Life Is Easy"; 2. "Calling"; 3. "Submit-Suppress"	15:20
Total length:		73:34

== Personnel ==
Fall of Because

- Justin Broadrick – drums, vocals
- G. C. Green – bass
- Paul Neville – guitar, vocals, tapes

Additional personnel

- Mick Harris – vocals on "Fight Show"
- Nicholas Bullen – vocals on "Fight Show"
