= Slateman =

Song by Godflesh

Single by Godflesh
- B-side: "Wound '91"
- Released: 1991
- Genre: Industrial metal
- Length: 5:58
- Label: Sub Pop; Earache Records
- Songwriter(s): Justin Broadrick
- Producer(s): J. K. Broadrick; G. C. Green

Godflesh singles chronology
"Slateman" (1991)	"Mothra" (1992)

Audio sample
- file; help

"Slateman" is a song by English industrial metal band Godflesh. It was released as a 7-inch single in 1991 through Sub Pop and later reissued on Earache Records as a CD, a 7-inch and a 12-inch. In 1996, the single was repackaged alongside Cold World (1991) on one disc by Earache Records as the compilation Slateman/Cold World. Both "Slateman" and its b-side, "Wound '91", were appended to the end of most issues of Godflesh's 1991 EP Slavestate.

== Background ==
The song "Wound '91" is an updated version of the song "Wound" from the unreleased Tiny Tears EP, which was later appended as bonus tracks to the end of the CD version of Streetcleaner (1989). The single's cover photograph was taken during a 1991 gig in London where the band opened for Nirvana.

== Critical reception ==
Ira A. Robbins of Trouser Press wrote, "The four-song Slavestate EP finds the band charging full-on into an industrial-dance realm, giving Streetcleaner's lurch-and-crunch the twist of a rhythmic basis. The concurrent "Slateman" single found that format mutated into yet another shape". Denise Falzon of Exclaim! described the live version of the song simply as "groovy". In 2023, Rolling Stone named "Slateman" the 51st best metal song of all time.

== Track listing ==
No.	Title	Length
1.	"Slateman"	5:58
2.	"Wound '91"	4:25
Total length:		10:23

== Personnel ==
- G.C. Green – bass guitar, production
- J.K. Broadrick – guitar, vocals, production
- Paul Neville – guitar
- Machines – rhythm, samples
- Jason Ashbridge – photography
