= Godflesh (EP) =

EP by Godflesh
- Released: September 1988
- Recorded: June–July 1988
- Studios: Soundcheck in Birmingham, England
- Genres: Industrial metal; avant-garde metal
- Length: 30:48 (original release); 52:36 (reissues)
- Labels: Swordfish; Earache
- Producers: Justin Broadrick; G. C. Green

Godflesh chronology
Godflesh (1988)	Streetcleaner (1989)

Godflesh is the debut EP by English industrial metal band Godflesh. It was originally released in 1988 through Swordfish Records and later saw several reissues on Earache Records with two additional songs. An unexpected underground success, the eponymous EP made it onto the UK Indie Chart and peaked at position 20. Though not supported by any singles or music videos at the time, a fan-made video for "Avalanche Master Song" has since been made official by the band.

Godflesh was recorded and produced over two months in Birmingham by frontman Justin Broadrick and bassist G. C. Green, both of whom had played together in an early version of the band known as Fall of Because. Despite often being overshadowed by the critical success of Godflesh's first full-length studio album, 1989's Streetcleaner, the EP was one of the first industrial metal releases and helped define the genre's sound with programmed drum beats, heavy metal guitar and unusual emphasis on bass. Its and the band's title strive to reconcile the potentially deep and meaningful impact music has on people with its harsher, more physical side.

== Background ==
Fall of Because, the band that would eventually become Godflesh, temporarily dissolved in 1987 when Justin Broadrick left to drum for the English experimental group Head of David. After only six weeks with that band, Broadrick was fired for being, according to him, "too noisy" of a drummer. In April 1988, he and Fall of Because bassist G. C. Green reformed their project under the name Godflesh and set to work on a self-titled EP, which consisted of songs Broadrick had written for Head of David. Godflesh recorded these rejected tracks in June and July of the same year at a studio in Birmingham with Broadrick and Green undertaking production duties themselves. Crucially, it was in this reunion that Broadrick shifted from acoustic drums to vocals and guitar and that the percussion was instead programmed on an Alesis HR-16 drum machine. The decision to employ stiff, mechanical beats rather than a traditional human drummer would prove pivotal for Godflesh and industrial metal at large. About the title of the EP and of the band at large, Broadrick said, "I heard someone once say that music is the voice of God. The word 'God' conjures something immense and inconceivable. The 'flesh' part is what effects you on a physical level. Our music is loud and destructive."

== Composition ==
"Veins"
"Veins", the first song recorded for Godflesh, showcases the EP's blend of industrial and heavy metal music.

"Ice Nerveshatter"
The ending of "Ice Nerveshatter" highlights the EP's focus on programmed experimentation.

As one of, if not the, first releases to merge the genres of industrial and metal, the music of Godflesh is defined by its programmed drumming, Broadrick's low guitar and growls and Green's pummelling bass. The EP's sound, informed by Swans, Big Black, Killing Joke and Throbbing Gristle, is notably heavy and slow, built upon the deliberately repetitive pounding of the drum machine. Simon Turner of Melody Maker highlighted the EP's discipline and restraint as its greatest asset, praising its so-called "cruelty of denial". The songs are often glacially paced, focusing on exploring chords through repetition, and Broadrick's vocals (either screamed or wailed) are sparse. Martin Walters of AllMusic described the guitar as "explosive", and Jason Birchmeier of the same publication called the tempo "lumbering". Alternative Press's Jason Pettigrew characterised the EP as "oppressive and brutal".

Unlike many metal releases with guttural vocals and downtuned instruments, the EP's tone is not overtly masculine. About this subject, Melody Maker's Simon Reynolds described Godflesh as "terminal", or at the end of musical development, writing, "Rather than feminise themselves, they'd rather their masculinity was defeated, their strong bodies crushed and pulverised." Broadrick has often noted this himself, referring to the band as defensive instead of offensive. When asked directly about the topic in 1990, he answered, "We despise the celebration of male ego that comes with most metal. It's pathetic; all these guys with their penis extension guitars just make us laugh."

== Release ==
Godflesh was released in 1988 through the independent label Swordfish Records. Distributed only on vinyl at first, the EP was a surprise underground hit that reached position 20 on the UK Indie Chart; Digby Pearson of Earache Records took notice and acquired Godflesh, promising them wider circulation since Swordfish could not fulfil international demand. In 1990, a year after the acquisition, Godflesh was reissued on CD with two bonus tracks. These songs, "Wounds" and "Streetcleaner 2", were in-house remixes of songs from the band's debut full-length album and first release on Earache, Streetcleaner (1989). Godflesh was remastered and again reissued in 2014, this time as a gatefold double LP. On all versions of the EP, the cover artwork was taken from the 1966 John Frankenheimer film Seconds.

A still frame from the video for "Avalanche Master Song" that depicts religious imagery typical to Godflesh

"Avalanche Master Song", the EP's introduction and a track that MetalSucks described as a "classic", is one of few Godflesh songs accompanied with a music video. Directed by three fans of the band (Jack Sargent, Julian Weaver and Stephanie Watson) who had followed Broadrick since his days drumming with Head of David, the video comprises bootleg recordings of early Godflesh concerts. Some of the footage is from the band's first public show in Brixton, London. Interspersed among performance clips are brief shots of Christian iconography, something typical to Godflesh. This video was officially released for the first time in 2001 on the compilation In All Languages. The title "Avalanche Master Song" is derived from two Leonard Cohen songs, "Avalanche" and "Master Song" from 1971 and 1967 respectively.

=== Critical reception and legacy ===
Godflesh received positive reviews, but it was mostly overshadowed by the band's later releases. Martin Walters of AllMusic called the EP "one of the most influential recordings in the industrial metal scene", but suggested that new fans should listen to Streetcleaner, Slavestate (1991) or Pure (1992) first. Walters went on to describe the EP as "pioneering" and said that it "undeniably marked a high point in avant metal". Also from AllMusic, Greg Prato said Godflesh helped "pave the way for countless copycat acts", and Jonathan Gold of the Los Angeles Times suggested that the EP influenced the sound of many metal groups, especially Ministry. Melody Maker published three discrete reviews of Godflesh from 1988 to 1990, each from different authors. In the first, Simon Turner praised the EP's focus on a drum machine as well as Broadrick's "huge but overawed" vocals. Turner appreciated the vulnerability of the music contrasted against its harshness and weight. In 1989, an author credited as 'P.O.' favorably contrasted Godflesh against then-current music trends, expressing a struggle to find what genre the band fit into. In 1990, Simon Reynolds reviewed the Earache reissue of Godflesh, admiring its extreme weight and blend of diverse influences.

Since the late 1980s and early 1990s, Godflesh's reputation has grown, and critics have retrospectively looked at their debut EP in a favorable light. Joe DiVita of Loudwire called Godflesh one of the "most exciting releases ever in heavy metal," and the same publication ranked it the 16th best metal EP ever. In their book The New Metal Masters, H. P. Newquist and Rich Maloof wrote that Godflesh was, at the time, the most ominous and malevolent music in existence. BraveWords called the EP "genre-defining".

== Track listing ==
All tracks are written by Justin Broadrick and G. C. Green.

Original release
No.	Title	Length
1.	"Avalanche Master Song"	5:14
2.	"Veins"	4:30
3.	"Godhead"	5:01
4.	"Spinebender"	5:07
5.	"Weak Flesh"	4:23
6.	"Ice Nerveshatter"	6:31
Total length:		30:48

1990 reissue bonus tracks
No.	Title	Length
7.	"Wounds"	13:06
8.	"Streetcleaner 2"	8:41
Total length:		52:36

== Personnel ==
Credits adapted from Godflesh liner notes

Godflesh

- Justin Broadrick – guitar, vocals, production, rhythm programming (credited to "Machine" on liner notes)
- G. C. Green – bass, production

Technical personnel

- Malcolm Ball – engineering
- Richard Davis – photography

== Charts ==
Chart (1988)	Peak position
UK Indie Chart	20
