= Paul Neville (musician) =

- Born: Birmingham, England, UK
- Genres: Experimental, noise
- Instrument: Guitar
- Years active: 1983 – present
- Labels: Permis De Construire Deutschland, Sentrax Records, Invisible, Alley Sweeper, Earache

Paul Neville is an underground experimental guitarist and musician from Birmingham, England.

He is best known as the second guitarist in the seminal industrial metal band Godflesh on the second half of their Streetcleaner album and on the Slavestate EP as well as a tour member of the band on respective supporting tours, although Neville had been making music with G. C. Green and later, Justin Broadrick, since 1983 in noise outfit Fall of Because; a band that would break up in 1987 and later reform in 1988 at Broadrick’s initiative, now evolved into the industrial noise core that was Godflesh.

Neville is noted for his distinctive style, which can be said to be influenced by that of Geordie Walker of Killing Joke, but with an even greater experimental edge and a flair for drawn out improvisation, creating an unusual and original synergy of noise and melody akin to some of the work of Norman Westberg, Justin Broadrick and Robert Hampson.

Apart from his work with Fall of Because and Godflesh, Neville is also the founder of the underground experimental noise band Cable Regime, also featuring Diarmuid Dalton (now also bassist with Jesu) and Steve Hough (also involved with Justin Broadrick’s Final, and once a Godflesh touring member), which has been his main project since 1992.

Neville continues to be on good terms with Justin Broadrick, with Broadrick co-producing all of Cable Regime’s albums and Neville making a guest appearance on the track “Man/Woman” from Jesu’s eponymous debut album.

Neville has also featured in a techno collaboration called AKA, but little is known of this outfit apart from a track released on the Lo Fibre Companion in 1998.

== Discography ==
With Fall of Because

- Extirpate (1986)
- Life Is Easy (1999, recorded 1986–1987)

With Godflesh

- Streetcleaner (1989)
- Slavestate (1991)
- "Slateman" (1991)
- Pure (1992) – additional guitar on "Love, Hate (Slugbaiting)"
- In All Languages (2001)

With Cable Regime

- Life in the House of the Enemy (1992)
- Kill Lies All (1993)
- Brave New World (1995)
- Cable Regime (2000)

With Napalm Death

- Noise for Music's Sake (2003)

With Jesu

- Jesu (2004) – guitar on "Man/Woman"
