= Streetcleaner =

Studio album by Godflesh
- Released: 13 November 1989 (Europe) 7 December 1990 (US)
- Recorded: 1988 (Tiny Tears bonus tracks); May–August 1989 (main album)
- Studios: Soundcheck in Birmingham, England and Square Dance in Derby, England
- Genre: Industrial metal
- Length: 52:21 (vinyl and cassette releases); 66:22 (CD releases)
- Labels: Earache, Combat (US)
- Producers: J. K. Broadrick; G. C. Green

Godflesh chronology
Godflesh (1988)	Streetcleaner (1989)	Slavestate (1991)

Streetcleaner is the debut studio album by English industrial metal band Godflesh. It was released in the UK by Earache Records on 13 November 1989 and in the United States by Combat Records on 7 December 1990. The album was then reissued with a second disc of previously unreleased material on 21 June 2010. The album is widely acclaimed by critics and is often cited as a landmark release in industrial metal; though not the genre's first release, Streetcleaner helped define what industrial metal would become.

Recorded in three distinct sessions and partially refined from pre-Godflesh demos, Streetcleaner is a weighty, bleak album that blends heavy metal with industrial music by means of production-emphasised bass, distorted guitar and, most importantly, machine percussion. Unlike many metal albums, guitar is employed to create screeching noise rather than discrete riffs, and the drums and bass are louder than is typical. Streetcleaner was supported by a series of concerts where Godflesh played alongside Napalm Death, and it was on the North American leg of the tour that the band began to gain significant international traction.

Since its release, Streetcleaner has received a number of accolades and has been performed in its entirety by Godflesh twice (once at Roadburn Festival, a recording of which was released as a live album in 2013). Many other metal bands have cited the album as particularly influential, including Neurosis, Fear Factory and Isis, and Godflesh frontman Justin Broadrick considers it one of his landmark releases. In 2017, Rolling Stone named Streetcleaner the 64th greatest metal album of all time.

== Background and recording ==
Before performing as Godflesh, G. C. Green (bass) and Paul Neville (guitar) played together in a band known as Fall of Because. That group, formed in 1982, were less overtly heavy than what they would become as Godflesh, drawing musical and aesthetic influence from bands like the Cure. Future frontman Justin Broadrick (guitar, vocals and programming) joined Fall of Because in 1984 and introduced Green and Neville to Swans, Sonic Youth and Discharge. Inspired by the dissonance of this music, the group recorded a demo called Extirpate (1986). The songs "Devastator", "Mighty Trust Krusher", "Life Is Easy" and "Merciless" were included on this demo, the first three of which would be rerecorded for Streetcleaner. These early versions were eventually released on a wide scale in 1999 via the compilation album Life Is Easy.

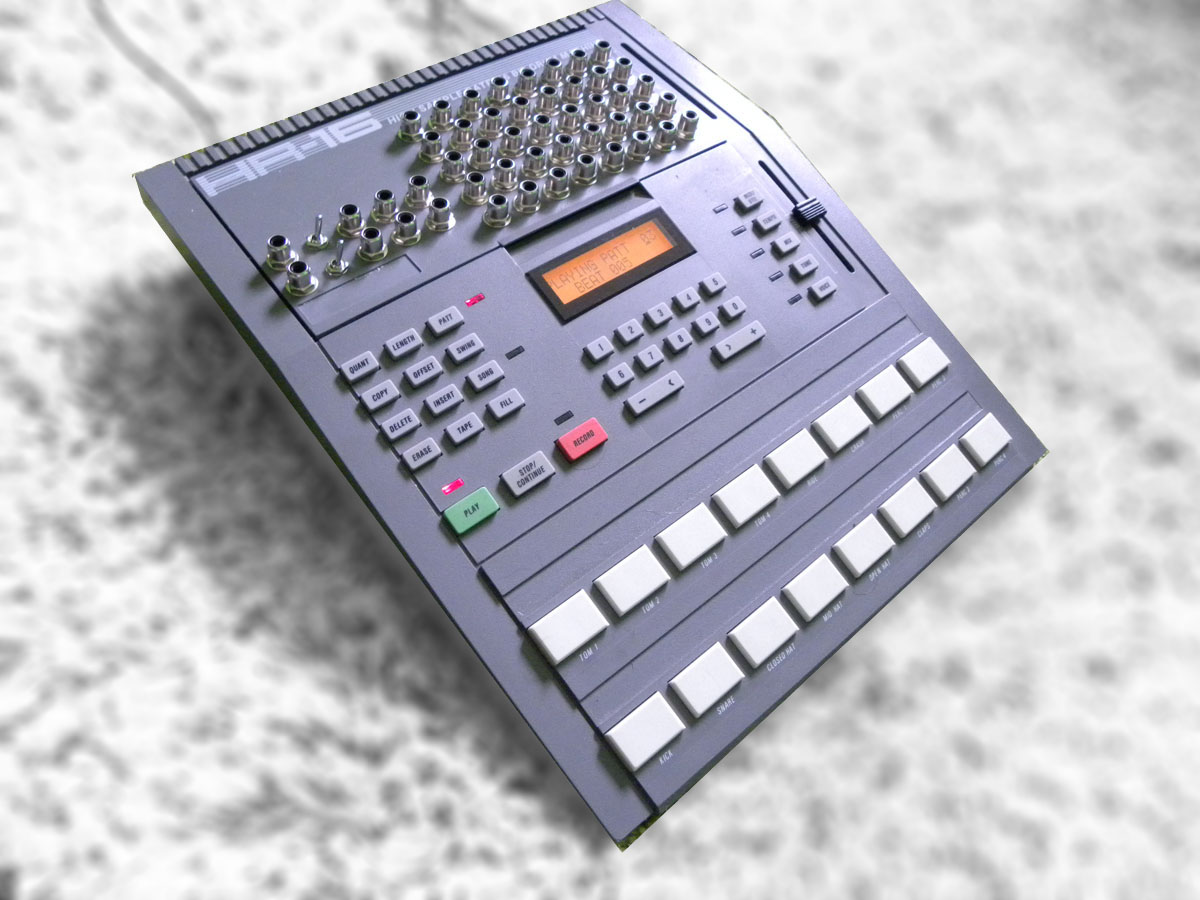
An Alesis HR-16, the model of drum machine used for Streetcleaner's percussion

Shortly after Fall of Because dissolved in 1987, Broadrick and Green reconvened without Neville and, in April 1988, renamed the project Godflesh. They released their debut self-titled EP on the independent label Swordfish later that year. That EP, though described by critics as raw and unrefined, is considered one of the originating industrial metal releases and proved to be the foundation upon which Streetcleaner would fine-tune Godflesh's approach to the genre. After the underground success of Godflesh, the band played several shows across Europe and recorded a four-track EP titled Tiny Tears. Before they could release the EP on Swordfish, Godflesh were acquired by Earache Records, and Digby Pearson, the label's head, urged the band to shelve the tracks and instead focus on putting out a complete studio album next. Broadrick and Green agreed and began recording Streetcleaner in May 1989 at Soundcheck in Birmingham and Square Dance in Derby.

The Birmingham sessions saw Broadrick and Green recording and mixing the first half of the album, while the Derby sessions (which yielded tracks six through ten) saw the temporary reincorporation of Neville into the band, this time as a second guitarist. Tiny Tears was appended to the end of CD versions of Streetcleaner, resulting in the album including material from three separate sessions. The entirety of the creative period was reinforced by an Alesis HR-16 drum machine. This choice was at first made out of necessity since Broadrick could not play the beats he wanted acoustically (he described himself as "[not] a great drummer"), but he came to embrace machine percussion and consider it a defining feature of Godflesh. Loudwire called the HR-16, specifically in regard to its use on Streetcleaner, "the most devastating drum machine ever employed". In a retrospective interview, Broadrick described the release as "one of the most alienating albums" he had ever made and referred to it as the band's landmark record.

== Composition and style ==
"The bass sound and texture, this is an integral part of the Godflesh sound. People often say that the bass is so loud in Godflesh they'll barely find another band [like it]. And that's entirely intentional, obviously."

— Justin Broadrick on the bass in Godflesh.

Musically, Streetcleaner was one of the earliest albums to merge industrial and heavy metal music. It accomplishes such a fusion through combining programmed, repetitive drum machine loops with Green's overdriven bass and Broadrick's distorted guitar. The vocals are sparse, guttural and bleak, and, according to Peter Buckley's Rough Guide to Rock, "misanthropic". Inspired by the harshness of early Swans material, Streetcleaner has been noted for its extreme weight and crushing aggression. Unlike the music of Napalm Death's 1987 album Scum, a release for which Broadrick provided guitar shortly before starting Godflesh, Streetcleaner is exceptionally slow, and the focus is placed on percussion and bass rather than vocals or traditional riffs. The style of guitar playing has been described as abrasive and deliberately grating, and the album is laden with factory sounds, stiff mechanical beats and overwhelming washes of noise. Thematically, Streetcleaner's dismal tone was born from Broadrick's troubled upbringing and from the oppressive Birmingham environment. About the album's desolate fury, he said, "there is a pure nihilism in there. Totally anti-everything. I couldn't come to terms with anything. It was all a struggle, and I just wanted to lash out at every target I possibly could".

Streetcleaner begins with one of Godflesh's most well-known tracks, "Like Rats". The introduction of the song, and of the album at large, is a wall of feedback. After the brief noise introduction, "Like Rats" descends into an intense, scathing song with prominent percussion, driving bass and piercing guitar. The screamed vocals, which Consequence of Sound's Andy O'Connor called "spine-chilling" and "some of the angriest verses laid to tape", are harsh and regularly noted for their punchy efficacy. Eduardo Rivadavia of Loudwire called the song "the genre standard", Decibel's Jonathan Horsley referred to it as "anthemic" and Revolver described it as "far-beyond-heavy".

"Like Rats"
"Like Rats" is an example of the album's blend of industrial programming and heavy metal.

"Dream Long Dead"
"Dream Long Dead" showcases the repetitive weight of the album.

Streetcleaner's second track, "Christbait Rising", has been cited by several critics as another high point of the album, and Decibel named it one of Godflesh's five best songs. While this track does feature a riff-heavy guitar breakdown in its latter segments, it is still dominated by machine drumming. According to Broadrick, the song's beat was his attempt to copy a rhythmic break in "Microphone Fiend" (1988) by Eric B. & Rakim. Luca Cimarusti of the Chicago Reader described "Christbait Rising" by writing, "Drum machines clank and scrape by, creating an eerie cyber-racket, while Broadrick and bassist G. Christian Green lay down impossibly heavy riffs on top. Broadrick's vocals—guttural and processed to sound like some sort of gigantic monster—make the whole thing sound like something out of a nightmare." "Pulp", the album's third track, is entirely built around a locked, repeating, uncomplicated drum loop; Green and Broadrick play over the beats, which completely drive the track. Because the percussion on "Pulp" features little to no changes over its running time, Godflesh occasionally performed extended versions of it where they simply allowed the machine to continue. "Pulp" and "Christbait Rising" were issued together as a promotional single in 1989.

"Dream Long Dead" is Streetcleaner's fourth song. Much of the track puts the squealing guitar of Broadrick at the forefront, but significant portions of the second half descend into heavy, repeating percussive movements where all instruments double the drums. The fifth track and the first recorded for the album, "Head Dirt", displays an unusual compositional structure, with the first half comprising a disjointed, jagged rhythmic loop and the latter half being almost entirely high-pitched guitar feedback. Those swelling waves of noise transition into "Devastator" and "Mighty Trust Krusher" (sometimes listed as two separate songs, sometimes listed as one combined track), the first composition on Streetcleaner from the recording sessions with Neville as a second guitarist and the first rerecorded remnants of the Fall of Because project. This nine-minute stretch is dark, dismal and oppressive, with enigmatic, growled lyrics and sounds underlaid with samples of voices. Ned Raggett of AllMusic considered it, along with "Like Rats" and "Christbait Rising", one of his favorite pieces on the album.

The seventh track on Streetcleaner, "Life Is Easy", is another holdover from the mid-eighties Fall of Because demos. Broadrick's and Neville's guitars clash and scrape against each other, creating eerie cacophony before the bass and drums kick in. The album's eighth song, its title track, begins with a sample of convicted serial killer Henry Lee Lucas speaking during an interrogation. "Streetcleaner" proper is one of the album's faster, more aggressive songs; as AllMusic's Stephen Cook describes, it "pummel[s] the listener with jackhammer percussion and ultra-demonic vocals", and Charlie Wood of Clash agreed, also calling the drumming similar to a jackhammer. "Locust Furnace" was originally designed as the album's closing track. The song itself is characterised by the drums and bass trading off with the vocals and guitar, and it concludes with Broadrick repeatedly shouting "furnace" as he grows gradually hoarser.

=== Tiny Tears and the Godflesh reissue ===
"Dead Head"
"Dead Head" showcases the musical differences between Tiny Tears and Streetcleaner proper.

The four Tiny Tears bonus songs (the title track, "Wound", "Dead Head" and "Suction") are Streetcleaner's shortest pieces. Because they were recorded apart from the album, they are compositionally different, more focused on propulsive hard rock riffs and beats than the stark, industrial sterility of Streetcleaner proper. Broadrick employs clean singing rather than growls, and multiple critics have described the tone of the songs as "ethereal". Noel Gardner of The Quietus called the EP a "muscular, enveloping follow-up, and utterly worth hearing". "Dead Head", a frantic song with stretched vocals, even has a tone that Sputnikmusic characterised as almost optimistic. Digby Pearson considered "Tiny Tears" one of his favorite Godflesh songs, and "Wound" would be revisited by Godflesh multiple times on future releases. One such future release, Earache's 1990 reissue of the band's debut EP Godflesh, featured two songs entitled "Wounds" and "Streetcleaner 2". Both are extended songs that have been manipulated and altered, something common for Godflesh. While "Streetcleaner 2" primarily builds upon and distorts "Streetcleaner", it also features deconstructed segments of "Pulp". It is one of Godflesh's earliest tracks to experiment with ambient elements. Another track, "My Own Light", was recorded during the Streetcleaner sessions but only saw release on label compilations.

== Release ==
Streetcleaner was released on 13 November 1989 through Earache Records. In the United States, it was released the following year on 7 December 1990 and was part of Earache's first push into the American market through a licensing deal with Combat Records; it was deemed a success. While the vinyl and cassette versions contained ten songs, the CD release included the Tiny Tears EP as a set of bonus tracks. In April 2010, Broadrick remastered the album and compiled seventy minutes of extra material for a double-disc reissue that was released later that year on 21 June. The bonus disc contained original unreleased mixes of songs from the Soundcheck sessions, live recordings from 1990, rehearsals and demos of some Tiny Tears songs that Broadrick believed revealed melodies that had been lost in the original mixing process. On all releases, the album's cover is a still frame of a hallucination scene from the 1980 Ken Russell film Altered States.

=== Live performances ===
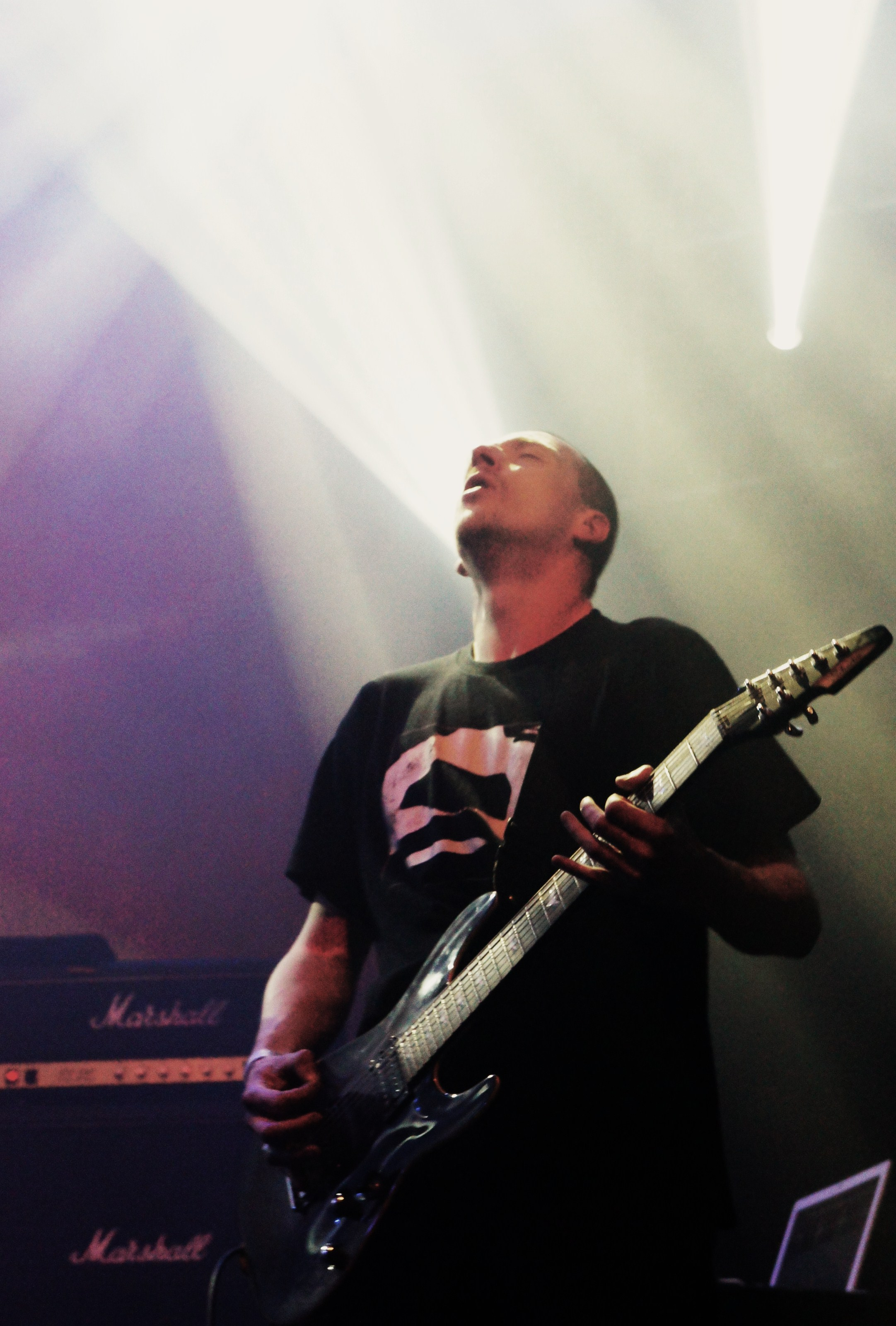
Justin Broadrick performing Streetcleaner in 2011

Godflesh toured Europe and North America in support of Streetcleaner from 1989 to 1991. Many of these shows were under the Grindcrusher Tour umbrella, which included fellow Earache acts Napalm Death and Nocturnus. By 1991 when Godflesh played in North America for the first time, the band was gaining "unexpected success" and "a loyal following". Neville performed with Godflesh during many of these shows, playing only on the songs which were recorded at the Derby Streetcleaner sessions. On 27 August 1989, Godflesh performed a four-song Peel session for BBC Radio 1. On the tracks played, "Tiny Tears", "Wound", "Pulp" and "Like Rats", the band experimented live, with Kevin Martin playing saxophone over "Pulp". Half of this session was released on the 2001 Godflesh compilation In All Languages, while the other two songs were only released through label compilations.

Apart from these initial tours, Streetcleaner tracks have remained a staple of Godflesh's set lists, and the album has been performed by the band in its entirety twice: once at Roadburn 2011 and once at the Hospital Productions 20th anniversary show in 2017. The Roadburn performance was recorded and released first through vinyl in 2013 as Godflesh's debut live album, then again in 2017 digitally and on CD.

=== Critical reception and legacy ===
Professional ratings
Review scores
Source	Rating
AllMusic	4.5/5 stars
Chicago Tribune	3/4 stars
Entertainment Weekly	B+
Metal Forces	95/100
Sputnikmusic	5/5
Tiny Mix Tapes	4.5/5 marks

Streetcleaner was met with positive reviews upon release, and its acclaim grew with time; several publications now list it as one of the best metal albums. Ned Raggett of AllMusic praised Godflesh's ability to deliver the apocalyptic impact of metal without resorting to invocations of Satan and death, and he highlighted the precision of the execution as particularly impressive. Chicago Tribune's Greg Kot called the album one of the most menacing ever released, and Entertainment Weekly's David Browne emphasised how intense and frightening it was. In 1992, Luca Collepiccolo of Blast! labeled the album as legendary. In a retrospective review of the album, The Quietus' Noel Gardner called Streetcleaner Godflesh's best material, a common stance; Joe DiVita of Loudwire wrote that Streetcleaner "borders on perfection", and Alternative Press' Jason Pettigrew regarded the album as a masterpiece. In 2010, Blabbermouth.net also agreed with Gardner, writing, "Streetcleaner was Godflesh's second release, proving to be one of the band's finest and most recognized albums and helping them to become one of the most influential industrial bands ever", and in 2013, Fact magazine lauded Streetcleaner as "arguably the 1980s' most important piece of extreme music". AllMusic's Jason Birchmeier called it "a landmark album whose status has steadily grown in stature over time".

As well as impressing critics, Streetcleaner has cultivated a major following among other musicians. Neurosis said that the album "was a game changer for everybody" that "forever changed heavy music", and Burton C. Bell of Fear Factory said, "[it] is a fantastically produced and written record; every song is an opus". Roy Christopher of Slap Magazine wrote, "1989's Streetcleaner is the seminal industrial-metal hybrid sound that bands all over the world are still trying to recreate". Devin Townsend also called the album "seminal" and claimed it as a major influence on his music, and in 2014, Revolver's Jon Wiederhorn wrote that Streetcleaner and Godflesh's second album, 1992's Pure, influenced bands like Korn, Isis and Converge. Dominick Fernow (better known as Prurient) credited the song "Like Rats", especially its noisy introduction, as a major influence on his musical experimentation. Aaron Turner of Isis described hearing Streetcleaner the first time by saying, "It honestly scared me. I was like, 'What the fuck is this?' It didn't even sound like music to me. Like, the first time I saw the Melvins, I didn't like it, but it made an impression on me that I can still recall today". In 1999, Isis covered the title track, beginning a long partnership between Turner and Broadrick. Broadrick reflected on the album as a highlight of his career by saying, "I'm really proud—even though it's been like an albatross around my neck—of the Streetcleaner album by Godflesh, because it was made without any ambition, and it seemed to change a lot of things in music and have a really wide effect". He later said in 2026 that "it's probably the best Godflesh album."

=== Accolades ===
Year	Publication	Country	Accolade	Rank	Ref.
1995	Alternative Press	United States	"Top 99 of '85 to '95"	34	
1998	Alternative Press	United States	"The 90 Greatest Albums of the '90s"	79	
2000	Kerrang!	United Kingdom	"200 Albums for the Year 2000: Essential Industrial"	*	
2000	Terrorizer	United Kingdom	"100 Most Important Albums of the Eighties"	*	
2002	Revolver	United States	"The 69 Greatest Metal Albums of All Time"	66	
2005	Kerrang!	United Kingdom	"The 100 Best British Rock Albums Ever"	78	
2011	NME	United Kingdom	"The Twenty Heaviest (Metal) Records of All Time"	7	
2011	Terrorizer	United Kingdom	"The Heaviest Albums Ever"	1	
2013	Fact	United Kingdom	"The 100 Best Albums of the 1980s"	3	
2017	Rolling Stone	United States	"The 100 Greatest Metal Albums of All Time"	64	
2018	Consequence of Sound	United States	"The 25 Greatest Debut Metal Albums of All Time"	8	
2018	Loudwire	United States	"The Best Metal Album from 40 Subgenres: Industrial Metal"	*	
2019	Pitchfork	United States	"The 33 Best Industrial Albums of All Time"	19	
2021	Revolver	United States	"10 Essential Industrial Albums"	*	
"*" denotes an unordered list.

== Track listing ==
All tracks are written by Justin Broadrick and G. C. Green. Tracks 6 to 10 also written by Paul Neville.

No.	Title	Length
1.	"Like Rats"	4:29
2.	"Christbait Rising"	7:00
3.	"Pulp"	4:16
4.	"Dream Long Dead"	5:19
5.	"Head Dirt"	6:09
6.	"Devastator"	3:20
7.	"Mighty Trust Krusher"	5:26
8.	"Life Is Easy"	4:51
9.	"Streetcleaner"	6:42
10.	"Locust Furnace"	4:45
Total length:		52:21

CD-only bonus tracks (Tiny Tears EP)
No.	Title	Length
11.	"Tiny Tears"	3:25
12.	"Wound"	3:05
13.	"Dead Head"	4:09
14.	"Suction"	3:22
Total length:		66:22

2010 remaster second disc
No.	Title	Length
1.	"Like Rats" (Original Unreleased Mix)	4:22
2.	"Christbait Rising" (Original Unreleased Mix)	6:50
3.	"Pulp" (Original Unreleased Mix)	4:07
4.	"Dream Long Dead" (Original Unreleased Mix)	5:08
5.	"Head Dirt" (Original Unreleased Mix)	6:01
6.	"Streetcleaner" (Live Geneva Early 1990)	5:47
7.	"Head Dirt" (Live Geneva Early 1990)	6:00
8.	"Pulp" (Rehearsal May 1989)	12:20
9.	"Dream Long Dead" (Rehearsal April 1989)	5:29
10.	"Christbait Rising" (Rehearsal April 1989)	6:34
11.	"Deadhead" (Original Demo Guitar & Machine 1988)	4:01
12.	"Suction" (Original Demo Guitar & Machine 1988)	3:11
Total length:		69:50

Notes

- On some releases, tracks 6 and 7 on the first disc are combined into one song titled "Devastator/Mighty Trust Krusher".

== Personnel ==
Credits adapted from Streetcleaner liner notes unless otherwise noted

Godflesh

- Justin Broadrick – guitar, vocals, production, Alesis HR-16 rhythm programming (credited to "Machine" on liner notes)
- G. C. Green – bass, production
- Paul Neville – guitar (tracks 6–10)

Technical personnel

- Pete Gault – engineering (tracks 1–5)
- Ric Peet – engineering (tracks 6–14)
- Noel Summerville – mastering

== Charts ==
Chart (1989)	Peak position
UK Indie Chart	19
