= Crush My Soul =

Song by Godflesh

Single by Godflesh

from the album Selfless
- Released: 1995
- Length: 36:52
- Label: Earache; Columbia
- Songwriter(s): Justin Broadrick
- Producer(s): Justin Broadrick; G. C. Green

Godflesh singles chronology
"Xnoybis" (1995)	"Crush My Soul" (1995)	"F.O.D. (Fuck of Death)" (2013)

Promotional cover
- Released in 1994

Audio sample
- file; help

"Crush My Soul" is a song by English industrial metal band Godflesh, taken from the album Selfless (1994). It was released in 1995 by Earache Records on 12" vinyl and CD. The single's two remixes were also included on the Selfless/Merciless compilation released on Earache Records in 1996.

== Music and critical reception ==
Regarding the song "Crush My Soul", Godflesh frontman Justin Broadrick said:

"Like most of my lyrics, "Crush My Soul" started off personal and eventually became a worldview; sometimes my worldview also becomes personal. It addresses the human race and its ever-increasing lack of emotional response, the cold machines that we're becoming. It's a huge scream at people to quite simply feel, to look at themselves inside before judging others. This sometimes can seemingly only be achieved by the individual going through some emotional pain of some description, which is most certainly good for the soul. People need to be emotionally crushed to feel."

Richard Fontenoy, a contributor to Rough Guide to Rock, stated in the book that "Godflesh's breakthrough into metal acceptance has a tendency towards mechanical, headbanging sameness, though the excellent 'Crush My Soul' is based around an asthmatically weaving sample loop." Ned Raggett of AllMusic wrote, "Songs like 'Anything Is Mine' and 'Crush My Soul', the latter infused with a strange breathing rhythm loop, or so it sounds, capture this version of major-label Godflesh pretty well, both unpleasant enough to keep the wimps away and accessible enough to win over the more open-minded." Ira A. Robbins of Trouser Press wrote, "the screaming 'Crush My Soul' demonstrate[s] an incipient sense of melody". Writing for Billboard, Larry Flick praised the single, saying, "Many may misread the passionate plea as angst, but buried deep beneath the cold, isolationist shell is a core with purely positive intentions. Dig for it."

On the "Ultramix" version of the song, The Wire wrote, "Even the rather ponderous industrial menace of Godflesh is transformed in their 'Ultramix' of 'Crush My Soul', although...it's too long."

== Music video ==
Originally, Broadrick wanted to recruit Swiss artist H. R. Giger to direct "Crush My Soul's" music video, but he proved too expensive. The video was ultimately directed by photographer Andres Serrano, who was known for his controversial 1987 photograph Piss Christ. The video, which was Serrano's debut music video, featured the band performing in the Angel Orensanz Synagogue interspersed with clips of cockfighting and religious iconography. Performance artist Bob Flanagan was also featured in the video, portraying an upside down Christ figure hoisted up on a ceiling. The video cost $75,000 to create.

=== Controversy ===
In an interview with SHOOT magazine, Serrano said, "I never set out to start any kind of controversy and I'm not foreseeing any kind of controversy with this video―it's not like we are out to prove anything." Regardless, the video drew media attention for its transgressive content. It was subsequently rejected from being aired by MTV, whose acquisitions group felt that "musically there wasn't a home for it at the current time." As a result of the rejection, Earache and Columbia Records changed their strategies into distributing the clip to regional video shows and to The Box, which aired content that MTV found objectionable. Broadrick believed the video's lack of airplay was in part responsible for Columbia abruptly dropping Godflesh.

=== Influence on Metallica ===
Godflesh showed the video for "Crush My Soul" to Metallica's Kirk Hammett. According to Broadrick, Hammett loved the video. Metallica later used art by Serrano for the cover of their 1996 album Load. Broadrick, disappointed by not being credited for discovering the artist, said this was no coincidence, and that no one in Metallica knew about Serrano before the "Crush My Soul" video. Later, Hammett praised Godflesh, calling them the heaviest band in the world and citing them as his favorite band.

== Track listing ==
All songs written by Justin Broadrick and G.C. Green.

No.	Title	Length
1.	"Crush My Soul"	4:28
2.	"Crush My Soul" (Ultramix)	14:58
3.	"Xnoybis" (Psychofuckdub)	17:26
Total length:		36:52

Promotional single
No.	Title	Length
1.	"Crush My Soul"	4:27
2.	"Crush My Soul" (Remix)	14:58
Total length:		19:25

Notes

- Some releases of "Crush My Soul" misspell "Xnoybis" as "Xynobis".

== Personnel ==
Godflesh

- G.C. Green – bass guitar, production
- J.K. Broadrick – guitar, vocals, production
- Machines – rhythm, samples

Additional personnel

- Bob Ludwig – mastering
- Jim Welch – publishing
