= Cold World (Godflesh EP) =

EP by Godflesh
- Released: 5 November 1991
- Recorded: September–October 1991
- Studio: Avalanche Studios
- Genre: Industrial metal
- Length: 22:38
- Label: Relativity; Earache
- Producer: J. K. Broadrick; G. C. Green

Godflesh chronology
Slavestate (1991)	Cold World (1991)	Pure (1992)

Song sample
- file; help

Professional ratings
Review scores
Source	Rating
AllMusic	2.5/5 stars

Cold World is the third EP by English industrial metal band Godflesh, released in 1991 through Earache Records. It was recorded and mixed during September 1991 as part of the Pure (1992) sessions.

The original EP was discontinued, but, in 1996, it was reissued along with the "Slateman" single on one disc through Earache as the compilation Slateman/Cold World. Later, in August 2009, this was reissued as part of a triple-CD package which also included the EP Slavestate (1991) and the band's second album, Pure.

== Critical reception ==
Cold World received mediocre reviews. Writing for AllMusic, Ned Raggett considered the EP a largely unremarkable continuation of the band's previous EP, Slavestate. He said the EP's title track would have benefited if it was included on Pure. Noel Gardner of The Quietus called Cold World a "curio", saying, "Rhythms are brought to the fore, vocals scaled back and jumbled among the overt volley of FX abuse; it sounds great but, again, the feeling is of a band trying their hand at something that wasn't really them."

== Track listing ==
No.	Title	Length
1.	"Cold World"	5:28
2.	"Nihil"	5:55
3.	"Nihil" (Total Belief mix)	5:37
4.	"Nihil" (No Belief mix)	5:36
Total length:		22:38

== Personnel ==
Credits adapted from liners note.

- G.C. Green – bass guitar, production
- J.K. Broadrick – guitar, vocals, production
- Robert Hampson – guitar (1)
- Machines – rhythm, samples
