= Pure (Godflesh album) =

Studio album by Godflesh
- Released: 13 April 1992
- Recorded: September–October 1991
- Genre: Industrial metal; post-metal
- Length: 48:30 (vinyl and cassette releases); 79:31 (CD releases)
- Label: Earache; Relativity
- Producer: J. K. Broadrick; G. C. Green

Godflesh chronology
Cold World (1991)	Pure (1992)	Merciless (1994)

Singles from Pure
- 1. "Mothra" Released: 1992

Pure is the second studio album by English industrial metal band Godflesh. It was released on 13 April 1992 through Earache Records. Though originally labeled only as industrial metal, the album has since been recognised as one of the earliest post-metal releases. Musically, Pure is rhythmically mechanical and features harsh guitars, with protracted songs and an abundance of deliberate repetition. Like much of Godflesh's music, it is regarded as particularly heavy and aggressive, and these elements helped it gain critical acclaim.

Pure was supported by the promotional single of and music video for "Mothra", and the 1991 EP Cold World was recorded in the same sessions as the album. In 2013, Godflesh performed the majority of Pure live at Roadburn. Despite dissatisfaction with the production quality of the album, Godflesh frontman Justin Broadrick considers it one of the band's most honest releases. In 2012, Fact ranked Pure as the 64th best album of the 1990s.

== Background ==
After the release of Godflesh's first album, 1989's Streetcleaner, the band played concerts across Europe and eventually embarked on a 1991 tour of North America with labelmates Napalm Death. This was the first time frontman Justin Broadrick and bassist G. C. Green played in America, and the band were met with unexpected favour. Broadrick elaborated upon their reception in a 2010 interview with Exclaim, saying, "By the time we got there, the band had already grown beyond my expectations, it was already becoming a popular band in the underground, which we hadn't really expected. It was very much a surprise for us that people responded so positively to the music". It was this tour that solidified Godflesh as a full-time project, and once it was over, Broadrick and Green returned to the studio. After the release of the 1991 EP Slavestate, the band decided to focus on a second studio album. The resulting sessions led to another 1991 EP, Cold World, and Pure in 1992.

With Pure, Broadrick wanted to explore the experimental side of Godflesh. However, at the time, the band were limited to 8-track reel-to-reel recording tape, which stifled some of his ambitions. To make up for the technological deficit and recent departure of second guitarist Paul Neville, Loop guitarist Robert Hampson was brought in to provide additional instrumentation. Hampson ended up playing on only half of Pure, but the additions helped reinforce the album's overwhelming sound. Broadrick later said the introduction "worked brilliantly". The album's title comes from Broadrick's idea that purity (especially a child's view of it) is strength.

== Composition ==
"The new record combines the desolate heaviness of Streetcleaner with the technology of Slavestate. Before we'd always write songs from a guitar or bass riff, but now we often start with a sample as a groove and build from there."

— Justin Broadrick on the band's direction for Pure

Pure is often characterised for its harsh, discordant and mechanical sound, with many critics noting its extreme weight and inhospitable mood. Unlike Streetcleaner, which featured intentionally loose guitar playing, Pure is intensely structured, regimented and stiff, dominated by repetition; The Times of Northwest Indiana called it "colossally repetitive". The guitar tone, a sound first explored by Broadrick on the 1991 Godflesh single "Slateman", is tinny and deliberately grating. Outright riffs are rare, leaving Green's bass and the programmed drums to guide the songs. Mike Gitter of RIP Magazine and Spin described the album as "a metal junkyard of strange harmonics and decayed muzak", and he called the guitars malevolent, the drum machine ice-cold and the bass clanging. Gitter concluded by writing that Pure is "two sides of technology gone amok that would rattle even Ministry's chain-link cage, and that makes Nine Inch Nails sound like the Pet Shop Boys!" Hampson's and Broadrick's guitars often hang in the background, leading Pure to be a notably percussive album with hip hop-inspired elements. The Chicago Tribune said the album employed what sounded like "a 20-ton rhythm machine". Broadrick's vocals on Pure, which are typically sparse, come in two primary styles: guttural shouting and "distant-sounding, voice-from-the-ether singing".

"Spite", the album's introductory track, begins with a jaunty hip hop loop that Kristi Siegel of the Tampa Bay Times compared to the percussion-heavy work of Skinny Puppy, a band that Godflesh briefly toured with before Pure. The lyrics of "Spite" are growled and direct, leading Broadrick to describe it as "the most literal song I've ever written" before calling it "as base as I can get". The second track and the album's only single, "Mothra", is a lively, driving song with some lyrics borrowed from Leonard Cohen's 1971 song "Avalanche". Shawn Macomber of Decibel recognised "Mothra" as a fan favourite, and Joseph Schafer of the same publication called the song "a colossal chugging machine" that sounds like "getting crushed by a ton of lead". The track's title is derived from Mothra, a fictional creature in the Godzilla franchise. Following that, "I Wasn't Born to Follow" is the first extended composition on the album; Sharon O'Connell of Melody Maker called it "a dream with heavy tread".

"Spite"
"Spite" shows Pure's hip hop beats.

"Don't Bring Me Flowers"
"Don't Bring Me Flowers" is an example of the album's stark atmosphere, unconventional application of guitars and focus on programmed percussion.

"Predominance", the fourth track on Pure, is a highly aggressive song that Gitter said took the sound of rock "to its bleakest and slowest extremes". Jason Pettigrew of Alternative Press called the song a "layered head-shock", and O'Connell wrote that the song "is all rough, rutting rhythm with a post-coital shudder fit to shift tectonic plates". The title track (named one of the five best Godflesh songs by Decibel) is built around a rhythm sample from "Let the Rhythm Hit 'Em" (1990) by Eric B. & Rakim, and "Monotremata" is an exceptionally slow nine-minute song with a degree of heaviness that is, according to Noel Gardner of The Quietus, "distinctive and inimitable". In 2014, MetalSucks singled out "Monotremata" as a "classic". The album's seventh song, "Baby Blue Eyes", features a stilted dance groove, and it is followed by "Don't Bring Me Flowers", a bleak, funereal song that was deconstructed (or "demixed" as the liner notes put it) on Godflesh's 1994 EP Merciless. The album concludes with "Love, Hate (Slugbaiting)" and "Pure II", the latter of which is a twenty-minute ambient sprawl with faraway drums that, according to Ned Raggett of AllMusic, hit "like a distant cannon". Gitter called the piece "a maximal approach to minimalism" that was "devastating" and "rips open a black hole".

While Pure is predominantly recognized as industrial metal, it has been cited as a key album to the post-metal genre, with some calling it one of the genre's founding releases. Jon Wiederhorn of Bandcamp wrote that it was "Pure, with its more expansive structures and long stretches of billowing noise, that inspired countless metal-based groups to experiment with layered washes of sound." Regardless of impact, Broadrick has occasionally expressed dissatisfaction with the production of the album. In a 2014 interview with The Quietus, he said, "My objections are the mixing. Not heavy enough. I was listening to a lot of hardcore hip hop at the time and I wanted the beats to be as heavy as that. That's my lingering dissatisfaction with that album." Still, when referring to what he considers and what he believes fans consider to be true Godflesh material, Broadrick often includes Pure. The album remains a staple of Godflesh's relatively picky live sets, with "Spite" and "Mothra" appearing most often.

== Release ==
Pure was released on 13 April 1992. CD versions included two bonus tracks: "Love, Hate (Slugbaiting)", the first three minutes of which were taken from a 1986 live performance of a previous incarnation of Godflesh called Fall of Because, and the protracted ambient piece, "Pure II". Pure was reissued in August 2009 as part of a triple-CD package which also included the 1991 EPs Slavestate and Cold World. "Mothra", a song that Decibel magazine called one of Broadrick's most accessible, was released as a promotional single for the album. In 2013, Pure was played in its near entirety at Roadburn. Robert Hampson appeared and performed live with the band, playing on the songs which he originally contributed to. The Loop song "Straight to Your Heart", which had been covered by Godflesh on the bands' 1991 split EP Loopflesh/Fleshloop, was also played. On 2 November 2022, the band released this performance under the title Pure : Live.

=== Critical reception ===
Professional ratings
Review scores
Source	Rating
AllMusic	4/5 stars
Christgau's Consumer Guide	(neither)
Collector's Guide to Heavy Metal	4/10
Guitar World	4/5 stars
Hit Parader	5/5 stars
Metal Forces	90/100
Melody Maker	Very positive
Q	3/5 stars

Pure received positive reviews upon release in 1992. Since then, its acclaim has grown. When the album came out, AllMusic reviewer Ned Raggett wrote, "In terms of grinding guitars and shouted vocals [...] it's pure Godflesh ire." In another contemporary review, Melody Maker writer Sharon O'Connell praised Pure for its weight, rhythm and ability to cover traditionally miserable topics in a "strangely life-affirming, almost soaringly spiritual" way. Also writing in 1992, Mike Gitter of Spin said, "driven by a monolithic drum machine that hammers with such force it could probably shift the tectonic plates, Godflesh successfully lays claim to the title of the most gloriously uncomfortable noise on the face of the planet", and Luca Collepiccolo of Blast! called the album an unmissable fusion of extreme metal and technology. Fact wrote in their 2012 "The 100 Best Albums of the 1990s" list, where Pure placed number 64, that "[the album] is far from the sound of Broadrick and Green going soft: one listen to the rampaging drum machines of its title track on a proper stereo is unforgiving proof of that." In 2014, Neil Kulkarni of The Quietus called the album a "stone-cold masterpiece." Later in 2015, Fact's Robin Jahdi placed Pure as the 18th best post-metal album of all time, writing "Pure is what happened when they started experimenting: incredibly harsh worlds of discordant post-punk guitar settling like factory smoke over catchy drum machine breakbeats." Brandon Stosuy of Pitchfork called the album "iconic", and Jon Wiederhorn of Revolver said that it influenced "bands ranging from Korn and Fear Factory to Isis and Converge". Some critics viewed Pure as more consistent than Streetcleaner, with greater attention paid to its beats and grooves.

=== Accolades ===
Year	Publication	Country	Accolade	Rank	Ref.
1992	The Wire	United Kingdom	"Albums of the Year"	18	
2000	Terrorizer	United Kingdom	"100 Most Important Albums of the Nineties"	*	
2012	Fact	United Kingdom	"The 100 Best Albums of the 1990s"	64	
2015	Fact	United Kingdom	"The 40 Best Post-Metal Albums Ever Made"	18	
2022	Revolver	United States	"20 Great Albums from 1992"	*	
"*" denotes an unordered list.

== Track listing ==
No.	Title	Length
1.	"Spite"	4:31
2.	"Mothra"	4:31
3.	"I Wasn't Born to Follow"	7:22
4.	"Predominance"	6:16
5.	"Pure"	5:02
6.	"Monotremata"	9:21
7.	"Baby Blue Eyes"	4:39
8.	"Don't Bring Me Flowers"	6:48
Total length:		48:30

CD-only tracks
No.	Title	Length
9.	"Love, Hate (Slugbaiting)"	9:57
10.	"Pure II"	21:04
Total length:		79:31

== Personnel ==
All credits adapted from the album's liner notes

- Justin Broadrick – guitar, vocals, engineering, production, rhythm programming
- G. C. Green – bass, engineering, production
- Robert Hampson – guitar (tracks 1, 3, 4, 8 and 10)
- Paul Neville – guitar (track 9)
