= Slavestate =

EP by Godflesh
- Released: July 1991
- Recorded: February–March 1991
- Studio: Avalanche Studios
- Genre: Industrial metal; electro-industrial
- Length: 22:10 (original EP); 58:15 (CD release)
- Label: Earache; Relativity
- Producer: Justin Broadrick

Godflesh chronology
Streetcleaner (1989)	Slavestate (1991)	Cold World (1991)

Slavestate is the second EP by English industrial metal band Godflesh. It was released in July 1991 through Earache Records. The EP saw the band experimenting with more samples and electronic sounds than their predominantly industrial metal prior releases.

== Composition ==
With Slavestate, Godflesh sought to diversify their metal-dominated sound by introducing elements of dance music and electronic body music. Still, the music retained the harsh guitar and vocals of frontman Justin Broadrick, as well as the extreme aspects of Godflesh. Ira A. Robbins of Trouser Press wrote, "The four-song Slavestate EP finds the band charging full-on into an industrial-dance realm, giving Streetcleaner's lurch-and-crunch the twist of a rhythmic basis." The EP's title track contains a sample of the song "Stakker Humanoid" by Brian Dougans.

"Meltdown"
"Meltdown", a critical highlight of the EP, shows Godflesh's industrial metal roots.

In 1992, after the releases of Godflesh (1988), Streetcleaner (1989), Slavestate (1991), and Pure (1992), Broadrick elaborated on Slavestate's shift in style when compared to the band's other records:

I wanted to use dance elements within the realm of Godflesh. We got some shit from people, but we also accessed a whole new audience [...] All four of our records are different. Now there's the techno audience that likes Slavestate.

== Release ==
Slavestate was initially released as a four-song EP. A three-song remix EP titled Slavestate Remixes saw a limited vinyl release in September that same year. The remixes were later appended to all further issues of Slavestate. The CD release also included the tracks from the follow-up "Slateman" single, which expanded Slavestate into a mini-album. In August 2009, Slavestate was reissued as part of a triple-CD package which also included the EP Cold World (1991) and the band's second full-length studio album Pure (1992).

=== Critical reception ===
Professional ratings
Review scores
Source	Rating
AllMusic	3/5 stars

Slavestate received lukewarm reviews, with the exception of the song "Meltdown", which was singled out as a highlight. Ned Raggett of AllMusic appreciated the change in pace from Godflesh's heavy, metal-focused music. Writing for The Quietus, Noel Gardner thought the introduction of electronic and dance elements was clunky but somewhat admirable. Broadrick was disappointed by the EP's contemporary reception, saying it "should have received far more acclaim than it did." In 1997, Metal Hammer retrospectively described the EP as "cutting edge".

=== Accolades ===
Year	Publication	Country	Accolade	Rank
2016	Decibel	United States	"The Top 30 Albums of 1991"	17

== Track listing ==
Original EP
No.	Title	Length
1.	"Slavestate"	3:58
2.	"Perfect Skin"	7:37
3.	"Someone Somewhere Scorned"	4:47
4.	"Meltdown"	5:48
Total length:		22:10

Slavestate Remixes
No.	Title	Length
5.	"Slavestate" (Radio Slave)	5:00
6.	"Slavestate" (Total State Mix)	8:29
7.	"Perfect Skin" (Dub)	12:15
Total length:		47:54

"Slateman" single
No.	Title	Length
8.	"Slateman"	5:56
9.	"Wound '91"	4:24
Total length:		58:14

== Personnel ==
Credits adapted from liner notes.

- Justin Broadrick – guitar, vocals, production
- G. Christian Green – bass
- Paul Neville – guitar
- Machine – rhythm
- Johnny Barry – layout
