= Merciless (EP) =

EP by Godflesh
- Released: 23 August 1994
- Recorded: 1991–1994
- Genre: Industrial metal
- Length: 28:20
- Label: Earache; Columbia (US)
- Producer: Godflesh

Godflesh chronology
Pure (1992)	Merciless (1994)	Selfless (1994)

Audio sample
- file; help

Merciless is the fourth EP by English industrial metal band Godflesh. It was released on 23 August 1994 by Earache Records, with Columbia Records handling the release in the United States. In 1996, the EP was reissued along with the Selfless (1994) album as the compilation Selfless/Merciless.

== Content ==
Recorded from 1991 to 1993, Merciless comprises one rerecorded song, two previously unreleased songs, and a remixed song. The EP's title track, recorded in December 1993, is an updated version of a 1986 Fall of Because song. "Blind" and "Unworthy", tracks 2 and 3 respectively, are both labeled as "Biomechanical Mix" in the EP's liner notes, though no original versions are publicly available. This is the same tag that Godflesh frontman Justin Broadrick applied to the remixes he made for Pantera in 1993 and God in 1995. Track 4, "Flowers", is a stripped-down remix, or "demix", of the song "Don't Bring Me Flowers" from Godflesh's 1992 studio album, Pure. After the EP was mastered and completed, Columbia brought in Bob Ludwig to refine the release. Broadrick said Ludwig's changes improved the sound.

The EP's cover is taken from the 1943 experimental film Meshes of the Afternoon by Maya Deren.

== Critical reception ==
Professional ratings
Review scores
Source	Rating
AllMusic	3/5 stars

AllMusic reviewer Daniel Gioffre wrote that the EP "displays clearly that there is method in Godflesh's madness, that their peculiar brand of discord is carefully calculated, in the full knowledge that there is consonance lurking inside every dissonance."

== Track listing ==
No.	Title	Length
1.	"Merciless"	6:16
2.	"Blind"	7:16
3.	"Unworthy"	7:13
4.	"Flowers"	7:34
Total length:		28:20

Merciless 12-inch promotional
No.	Title	Length
1.	"Unworthy" (Biomechanical Mix)	7:13
2.	"Blind" (Biomechanical Mix)	7:16
3.	"Flowers"	7:34
4.	"Merciless"	6:16
Total length:		28:20

== Personnel ==
- G. C. Green – bass guitar, production, engineering
- Justin Broadrick – guitar, vocals, production, engineering
- Robert Hampson – guitar (tracks 3 and 4)
- Machines – rhythm, samples
- Bob Ludwig – mastering
