= Godflesh =

English industrial metal band

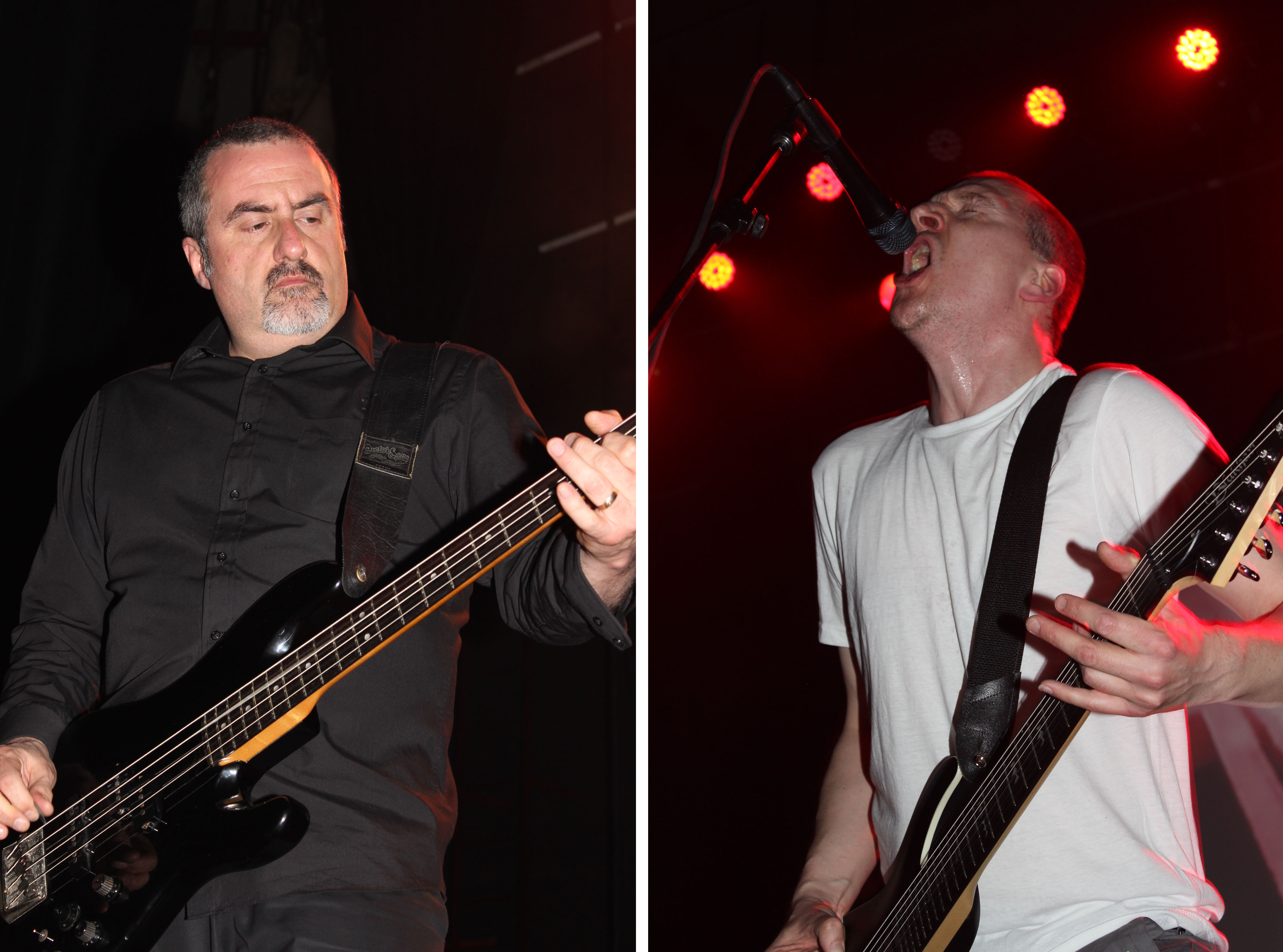
- Godflesh performing on 22 April 2014: B. C. Green and Justin Broadrick

Background information
- Also known as: O.P.D. (1982–1983); Fall of Because (1983–1987)
- Origin: Birmingham, England
- Genres: Industrial metal; post-metal; experimental metal
- Works: Discography; songs
- Years active: 1988–2002; 2009–present
- Labels: Swordfish; Earache; Columbia; Avalanche; Music for Nations; Koch; Relapse
- Members: Justin Broadrick; B. C. Green
- Past members: Paul Neville; Robert Hampson; Bryan Mantia; Ted Parsons; Paul Raven

Godflesh are an English industrial metal band from Birmingham, formed in 1988 by Justin Broadrick (guitar, vocals, programming) and B. C. Green (bass, programming). Before forming Godflesh, the pair worked together in Fall of Because, a band that began in 1982 as O.P.D. and helped lay the groundwork for Godflesh’s formation. Through their fusion of hip hop–derived drum programming, metal riffs, and industrial dissonance, later exploring electronic and dub elements, Godflesh developed a sound widely recognized as foundational to industrial metal and post-metal, and influential across experimental and extreme metal. (Note: Godflesh's influence on musical styles: Industrial metal; Post-metal; Experimental metal; Extreme metal)

The band signed to Earache Records in the late 1980s and released their debut album Streetcleaner (1989) to contemporary and lasting acclaim. After the release of their sophomore album Pure (1992) and their major label debut Selfless (1994), they started experimenting with live drums as well as hip hop and breakbeat sounds. The resulting albums, Songs of Love and Hate (1996) and Us and Them (1999), were followed by Hymns (2001), which saw a simplification of the band's style. Shortly after Green's departure in 2002, Broadrick ended Godflesh and pursued various other projects, such as Jesu. Broadrick and Green reformed Godflesh in 2009, releasing A World Lit Only by Fire (2014) and Post Self (2017) to critical acclaim. Their ninth album, Purge, was released in June 2023. In March 2026, Broadrick announced that Godflesh as a live act was over due to health complications and that two final studio albums were forthcoming, including their tenth album, Decay, which released in September 2026 to further acclaim.

As pioneers of industrial metal, Godflesh's early sound was defined by harsh machine beats, production-emphasised bass, distorted guitar and sparse vocals delivered in a low, guttural fashion. The band performed for most of their career as a duo with Broadrick and Green playing over preprogrammed percussion, normally to a backdrop of apocalyptic scenery and Christian iconography. Godflesh's music has been regarded as especially heavy and grim, with Streetcleaner being named by several publications as one of the heaviest and greatest metal albums. (Note: Streetcleaner reception: As musically significant; As particularly heavy; As critically acclaimed)

== History ==
=== Formation and early years (1982–1988) ===
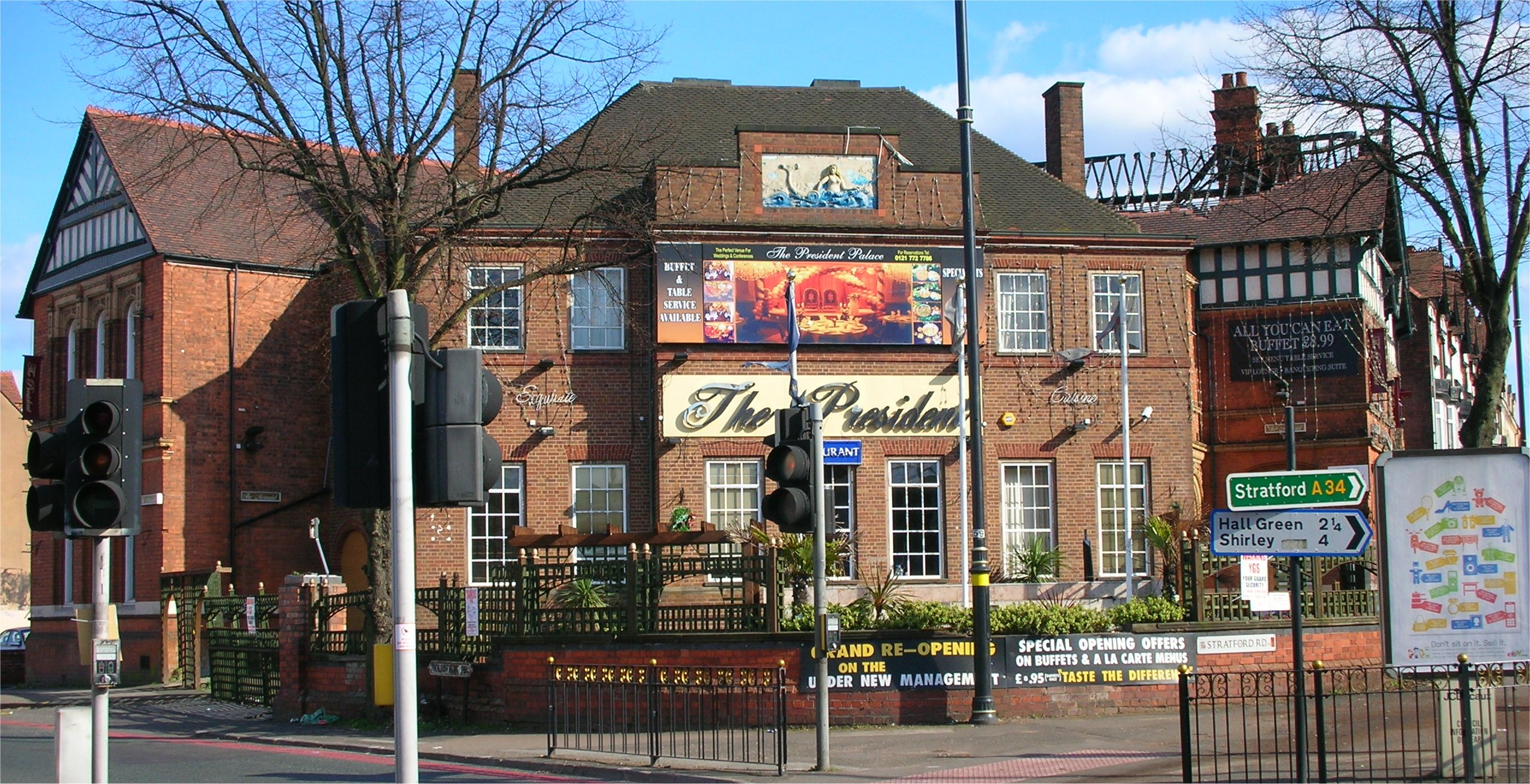
The Mermaid, site of Fall of Because's first concert with Broadrick

The band that would eventually become Godflesh, O.P.D. (Officially Pronounced Dead), formed in 1982 when B. C. Green and Paul Neville, two young musicians living in cheap council estate housing in east Birmingham, started experimenting musically alongside a drum machine. In 1983, the band renamed to Fall of Because, named after a Killing Joke song and a chapter from an Aleister Crowley book. The band found a live drummer, Justin Broadrick, who lived in the same council housing as Green and Neville. Broadrick joined the group in 1984 after organising a concert at The Mermaid in Birmingham. At that show, Fall of Because, Final (Broadrick's first musical act), and an early incarnation of Napalm Death performed before a crowd of twenty-five people. In the months following that concert, Broadrick joined Napalm Death as a guitarist and Fall of Because as a drummer and altered the latter's sound by introducing albums from Swans, Sonic Youth and Discharge to Green and Neville. Only fifteen at the time, Broadrick said he "usurped" their band.

Fall of Because recorded a demo titled Extirpate in 1986, which contained several tracks that would become Godflesh songs. Due to these recordings not being widely available until 1999, they were retrospectively recognised as "eerily" ahead of their time by Exclaim!. Later in 1986, Broadrick was invited to play drums for Head of David, leading to his departure from Napalm Death and soon after from Fall of Because in 1987. Then, in March 1988, he left Head of David for being, according to Broadrick, "too noisy of a drummer", and contacted Green in April to reform Fall of Because as a duo. In that reformation, Broadrick took over on guitar, and the band went back to employing a drum machine for percussion. It was then that the group was renamed Godflesh. Broadrick explained the new name by saying, "I heard someone once say that music is the voice of God. The word 'God' conjures something immense and inconceivable. The 'flesh' part is what effects you on a physical level. Our music is loud and destructive."

=== Self-titled EP, Streetcleaner and Pure (1988–1993) ===
"Avalanche Master Song"
From Godflesh (1988), "Avalanche Master Song" showcases the band's innovative mixture of metal and industrial music.

"Christbait Rising"
From Streetcleaner (1989), "Christbait Rising" showcases Godflesh's refinement of industrial metal.

Inspired by the bleak urban landscape of Birmingham and the extreme music Broadrick introduced to Green, Godflesh took on a distinctly more industrial tone than the primarily crust punk and post-punk-influenced Fall of Because. In 1988, the band established a presence in underground music by releasing their self-titled extended play (EP) through the Swordfish label. That EP, considered the source of industrial metal alongside Ministry's 1988 studio album The Land of Rape and Honey, combined programmed industrial beats, distorted vocals, low guitar and driving bass riffs to create the sound that Godflesh would become known for.

Shortly after the Godflesh release, the band recorded another EP titled Tiny Tears comprising four short, rough songs. Before Swordfish could release this EP, though, Godflesh were acquired by Earache Records, and the label's founder, Digby Pearson, convinced Broadrick and Green to shelve Tiny Tears and use the songs as bonus tracks on their first full-length album. The band agreed, and in 1989 they released Streetcleaner, which went on to receive critical acclaim and recognition as a landmark album in heavy metal music. Streetcleaner saw the reintroduction of Neville into the band, this time as the second guitarist, and it marked the band's first release of many on Earache. The album further defined Godflesh's sound, standing out from other metal releases with unusual production that emphasised mechanical beats and percussive bass over guitar. Streetcleaner is regarded as particularly heavy and bleak.

From February to March 1991, Godflesh were again in the studio, recording the Slavestate EP, which saw the band experimenting with dance and more electronic elements. Later that year in April, Godflesh embarked on their first tour of North America (a leg of Earache's Grindcrusher tour) with labelmates Nocturnus and Napalm Death. According to Mike Browning of Nocturnus, most of the shows of the 45-day tour were attended by 200 to 300 people. Godflesh missed the first concert due to permit issues, but they made it to the second date at the L'Amour in Brooklyn. The venue was full, and when Godflesh took the stage, their drum machine failed and the band could not continue. When a replacement machine was eventually found, Broadrick and Green hastily programmed in four songs to be ready for the tour's third show at the Channel in Boston. Despite these initial difficulties, the rest of the tour went well and Godflesh drew surprisingly positive reception. Slavestate was released in July after Grindcrusher had concluded. In August and October 1991, both Broadrick and Green guested on Buried Secrets (1992), an EP by Painkiller.

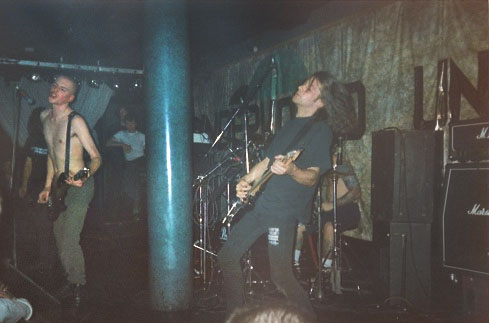
Godflesh performing at Camden Underworld on 10 October 1991. From left to right: B. C. Green, Justin Broadrick, Robert Hampson and Mick Harris

With the successes of Streetcleaner, Slavestate, a concert opening for Nirvana and the Grindcrusher tour, Godflesh started on their second album, this time without Neville, who chose to focus on his other project, Cable Regime, which featured Broadrick as a recurring producer. To fill the void, Robert Hampson of Loop was brought in to play on half of the new album's tracks as well as on Cold World (1991), an EP recorded in the same sessions. The sophomore album, Pure, was released in 1992 through Earache and has since been recognised as an influential release in the post-metal genre. Musically, Pure was even more mechanical than Streetcleaner, further emphasising the drum machine and featuring production that augmented the percussion with a stark, bleak atmosphere. Though Godflesh's most overt experiments with hip hop and breakbeats occurred later in their career, Pure featured elements of both buried under the wailing guitar, shouted vocals and aggressively repetitive drumming. The album continued its experimentation with atypical song structures on its conclusion, "Pure II", a twenty-minute ambient drone piece with a submerged beat that, as AllMusic's Ned Raggett said, "hits like a distant cannon".

Despite Broadrick's dissatisfaction with the mixing on Pure being "not heavy enough", many critics regarded the album as unrelenting; in a positive review, Spin's Mike Gitter wrote that "Hiroshima was probably more fun [than Pure]". In support of the album, Godflesh planned to open for Ministry on another tour of North America, but instead ended up opening for the electro-industrial band Skinny Puppy on their Last Rights (1992) tour. Due again to issues with entering the United States, Godflesh were forced to cancel a number of these dates; they later returned to those markets as headliners to make the missed shows up. Broadrick retrospectively said that this era of the band stands as "the most honest representation of what Godflesh set out to achieve."

=== Selfless, Songs of Love and Hate and Us and Them (1994–2000) ===
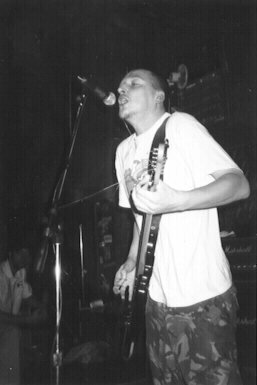
Godflesh performing live in November 1996

After a year of minimal activity in 1993, Godflesh were approached by several record labels. According to Broadrick, Danny Goldberg of Atlantic Records invited them to London and expressed his desire to acquire the band. About this period, Broadrick said, "They really thought that Godflesh could be the next Nine Inch Nails and that we would be selling out fucking stadiums. The buzz at the time was ridiculous. It outweighed the sales, obviously. It was all hype." Ultimately, the band ended up with major record label Columbia for the release of the EP Merciless in 1994, the title track of which was originally a Fall of Because song. Another EP, Messiah was recorded during these sessions, but it was not released on a wide scale until 2003 through Relapse Records. Later in 1994, the band released their third album, Selfless, which represented a shift in the group to a more high-end production approach and to a greater focus on traditional heavy metal riffs. Despite being the band's best-selling record with approximately 180,000 copies shipped, Selfless was deemed a commercial disappointment. This coupled with the ban of Godflesh's first major music video led to the end of their collaboration with Columbia.

Feeling abandoned after being abruptly dropped by Columbia, Godflesh were briefly directionless in 1995. In 1996, the band returned to Earache and created their fourth studio album, Songs of Love and Hate, which was Godflesh's first music made with a human drummer since the early Fall of Because days; Bryan Mantia of Praxis provided the aggressive, non-mechanical drumming. In retrospect, Broadrick believed Songs of Love and Hate marked the point where Godflesh lost sight of their original goal and started making "self-conscious" music. When it came time for the album's 1996 tour, Mantia made the move to join Primus, and Godflesh recruited Ted Parsons of Prong and Swans to perform on the tour in his place. Along with the album's follow-up remix release, Love and Hate in Dub (1997), Songs of Love and Hate moved away from Godflesh's industrial roots into experimentation with conventional verse-chorus format, hip hop, dub and drum and bass. The remix album was supported by a one-off concert on 4 October 1997 at The Garage, London where Broadrick operated a mixing desk, Steve Hough played guitar, Green played bass and Diarmuid Dalton provided support on a Moog synthesiser.

"Almost Heaven" (Helldub)
From Love and Hate in Dub (1997), "Almost Heaven" (Helldub) showcases the band's experimentation with dub and hip hop beats and shares features in common with another Broadrick project, Techno Animal.

This experimentation continued and increased with Godflesh's next album, Us and Them (1999). While live drumming was dropped again in favour of percussive machines, Us and Them saw the group going further with electronics and drum-and-bass-oriented sound than ever before. Broadrick was quick to admit that he "hated" the album and that it was an "identity crisis". Retrospectively, though, he revised his thoughts, saying that his hatred was overstated despite him still having issues with the album. Shortly after releasing Us and Them in 1999, Godflesh began work on a proposed remix album, Us and Them in Dub. While this album was never released, two tracks from it appeared on the 2001 compilation In All Languages. Also in 1999, Life Is Easy, an album compiling Godflesh's recordings as Fall of Because, was released on the Alleysweeper label and distributed via Martin Atkins' Invisible Records label.

=== Hymns and dissolution (2001–2002) ===
Following the release of the double album compilation In All Languages, Godflesh released their sixth studio album, Hymns (2001) through several different labels. The album again saw Godflesh with a human drummer; Parsons returned to provide the live percussion and, according to Broadrick, the inspiration for Godflesh to continue. Hymns marked a dramatic shift away from Godflesh's recent experimentation, moving instead into the realm of direct heavy metal, with only a few tracks revealing hip hop or electronic influence; Broadrick wanted Hymns to be more of a rock album than any other Godflesh releases. The album was recorded in a professional studio and a producer outside of the band was brought in to oversee the process, two firsts for Godflesh that Parsons believed to be mistakes. Despite receiving positive reviews, the final product of Hymns was ultimately dissatisfying for Broadrick, so much so that he restored it to a state resembling its demos on the 2013 reissue. With the band disheartened by Hymns' troubled production and dreading an upcoming tour, the direct future of Godflesh was unclear.

"Paralyzed"
From Hymns (2001), "Paralyzed" showcases the album's hard rock sound and employment of conventional metal drumming.

In October 2001, the same month Hymns was released, Broadrick received a call from Green just two weeks before Godflesh were set to tour with Strapping Young Lad and Fear Factory. Over the phone, Green expressed frustration at having to open for young bands despite being in the business since 1982, as well as being forced into a tour for an album that was manipulated from the outside. Green tearfully left Godflesh to return to university and focus on his relationship with his partner. To cope with the departure of his friend, Broadrick devoted all of his effort to maintaining the band. It was quickly announced that Green would be replaced by former Killing Joke and Prong bassist Paul Raven. Though this configuration of Godflesh came up with some ideas for another studio album (namely the usage of a rhythm from Public Enemy's "Shut 'Em Down"), Broadrick was "always aware that a new album was never going to happen". Not long after this short-lived incarnation of Godflesh performed a handful of shows that Broadrick later said "felt completely wrong", he experienced a nervous breakdown the day before departing for another tour of North America, this time with High on Fire and Isis. He recalled the breakdown as a "real Brian Wilson moment" and said, "I felt paralyzed by the stress, which had been building for several months, and I literally couldn't get out of bed. I was numb and couldn't move, so when the car came to pick me up to take me to the airport, I ran and hid at another friend's house in Birmingham." All of the shows were called off, and Godflesh officially disbanded on 10 April 2002.

The cancelled tour caused a number of problems for Broadrick; his thirteen-year relationship with his girlfriend dissolved, and a bus driver who had been hired for the tour threatened his life. In a panic, Broadrick remortgaged his house and amassed approximately US$35,000 to pay the driver and everyone else who had been affected by the cancellation. Broadrick, at a low point in his life, was left with little to do but work on new, different music. About the period, he said, "My only solace, my only escape at that time was recording the first Jesu album." "Jesu", the closing track of Hymns and, until 2014, the last original Godflesh song, ended with a hidden passage of unusual peacefulness and melodicism. Broadrick's next project, bearing the same title of Jesu, adopted that shoegaze sound and the new band's first EP, Heart Ache, was released in 2004. On promotional material for Heart Ache, a message from Broadrick read, "Godflesh is dead, long live Jesu."

=== Reformation (2009–2013) ===
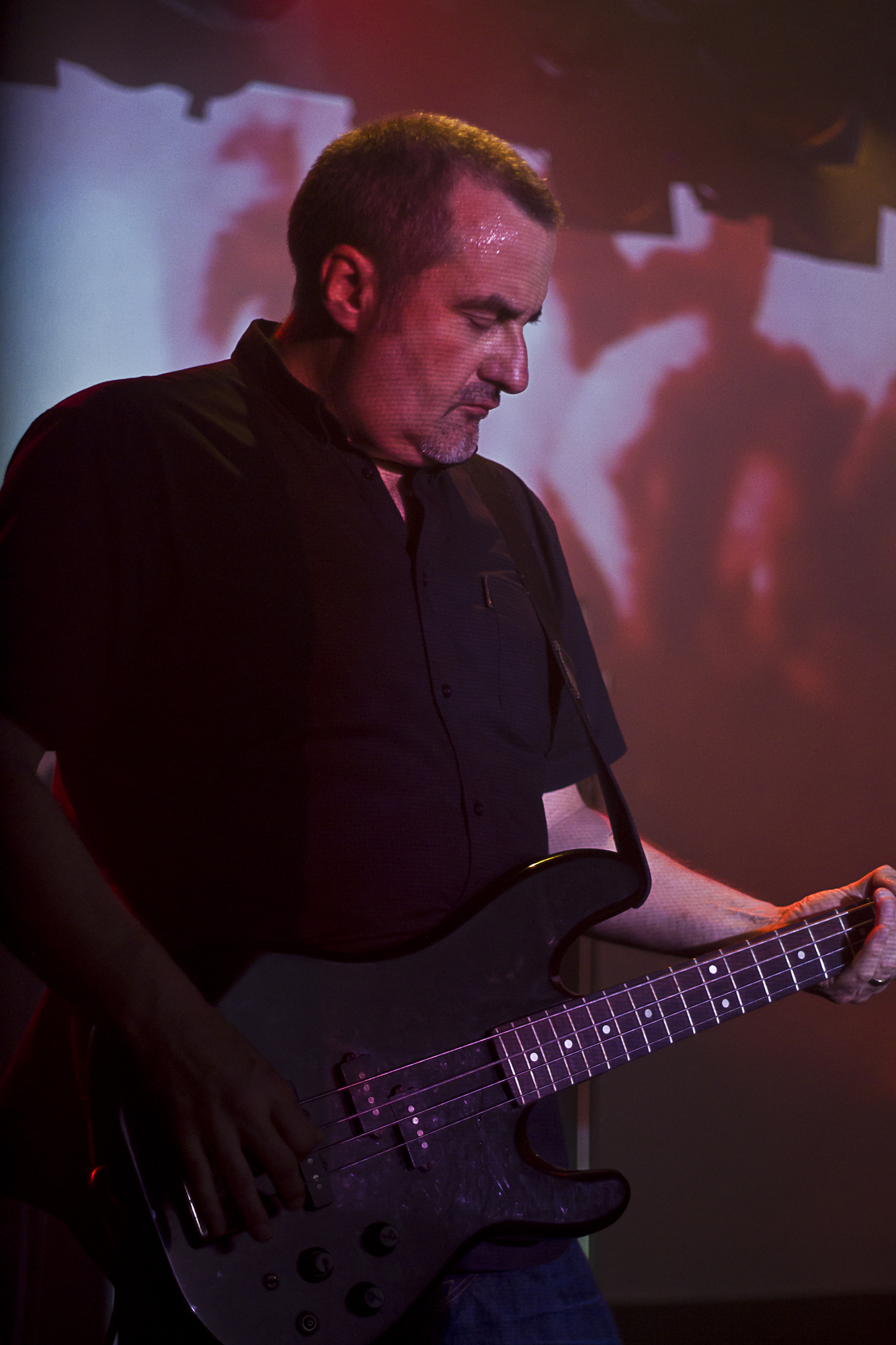
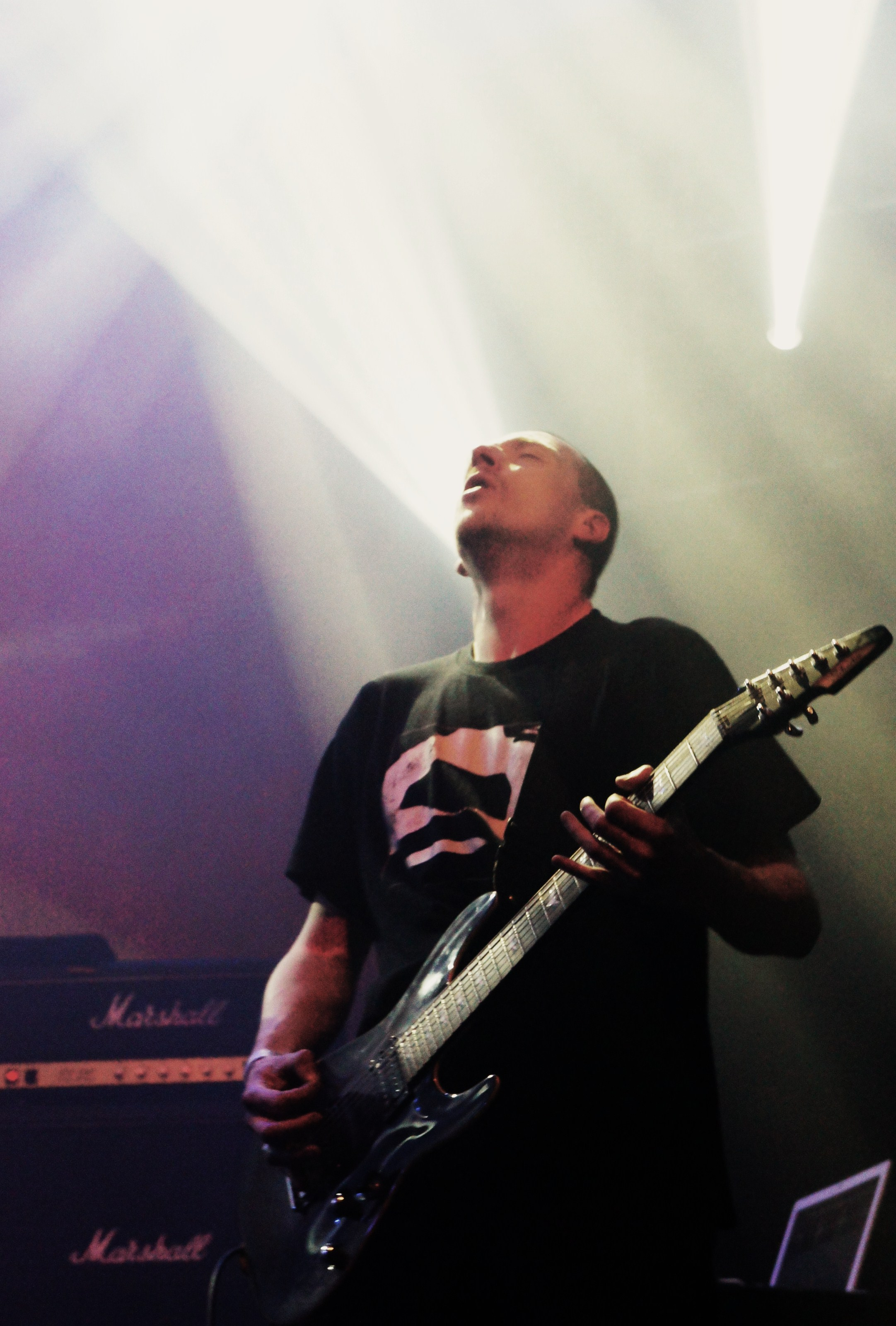
Godflesh performing reunion concerts

After Godflesh's dissolution, Broadrick and Green rarely spoke. Though there was no falling out between the two members, Broadrick assumed the project permanently dead, believing that Green's interest in it was gone. Regardless, Broadrick decided in 2009 to approach Green with an offer to reform, something that promoters had been pushing for years. Green responded to Broadrick's call within a few hours, saying he would love to do it. Both members quickly agreed that the most important thing for the reunion's integrity was that they return to a drum machine for percussion. In November 2009, the reunion was made public when Godflesh announced they would perform at the 2010 edition of the Hellfest Summer Open Air in Clisson, France. Asked in a February 2010 interview about Godflesh's future, Broadrick replied, "Godflesh will not commit to anything but Hellfest currently. I am unsure as to where we will go from there, if we go anywhere at all." He also revealed that the likelihood of new material was "fairly minimal", but that the possibility still existed; though later, in 2014, he insisted that "ultimately, the whole reformation thing was pretty much fundamentally about wanting to make new music". On 18 June 2010, Godflesh performed for their first time since 2001 at Hellfest. The show was fraught with technical difficulties, ending up as a forty-minute set instead of the intended sixty minutes. Despite the frustration of the return performance, Godflesh continued to play festivals throughout 2010 and 2011, including Roadburn in Tilburg, Netherlands, where they performed their first album, Streetcleaner, in its entirety. This performance was later released as the group's first live album in 2013.

In December 2010, Broadrick revealed to Decibel magazine that Godflesh were gradually assembling new ideas for a studio album. He explained, "It's something we're discussing all the time, and I do have bits and pieces of material. But it's something we'd really like to develop. It'd be quite easy to knock out eight to ten in-character songs and release it as quickly as possible to capitalise on the popularity of the group, but it would feel entirely wrong." In 2011, Godflesh (along with Black Sabbath, Napalm Death, Judas Priest and Led Zeppelin) were recognised by the UK-based Home of Metal archival project as significant contributors to the heavy metal genre. With this accolade absorbed, Broadrick continued to confirm the existence of a new Godflesh album throughout 2012, saying it would most likely be out in 2013 after a new EP. In 2013, Godflesh released their first new recording in over twelve years, a cover of Slaughter's "F.O.D. (Fuck of Death)", through Decibel magazine's flexi disc Series. The flexi disc was included in the November 2013 issue of Decibel. Later in 2013, Godflesh performed Pure in its entirety at Roadburn, featuring Hampson on guitar for part of the set. In 2014, Broadrick said that disbanding Godflesh was the best thing they had ever done and stated that the upcoming album was his favourite since 1994's Selfless.

=== A World Lit Only by Fire and Post Self (2014–2021) ===
"Shut Me Down"
From A World Lit Only by Fire (2014), "Shut Me Down" showcases the band's heavy return.

From 2012 to 2014, Godflesh were in Broadrick's private studio, working on their seventh album. The process was slow due to Broadrick's commitment to making a proper Godflesh album instead of a hollow exploitation of the reformation's media attention. After a long revision process, the 2014 EP Decline & Fall and the 2014 album A World Lit Only by Fire came out of those sessions, both of which featured Broadrick on an eight-string guitar. The album was the band's first to chart in the U.S., and it was met with critical acclaim, drawing praise for its extreme weight and being lauded as the ideal return for Godflesh. Musically, Broadrick stated A World Lit Only by Fire was most similar to Streetcleaner and Pure, and Green added that it was "spiritually" close to those first few releases. About the album's sound, Broadrick said, "It's extremely minimal and very, very brutal — a fairly unforgiving record, really, I think." Decline & Fall and A World Lit Only by Fire were heavy, distorted, riff-driven industrial releases that Broadrick saw as a return to the direct simplicity of Godflesh's original form. All of the recording, engineering, artwork and packaging was done by Godflesh through Broadrick's own label, Avalanche Recordings.

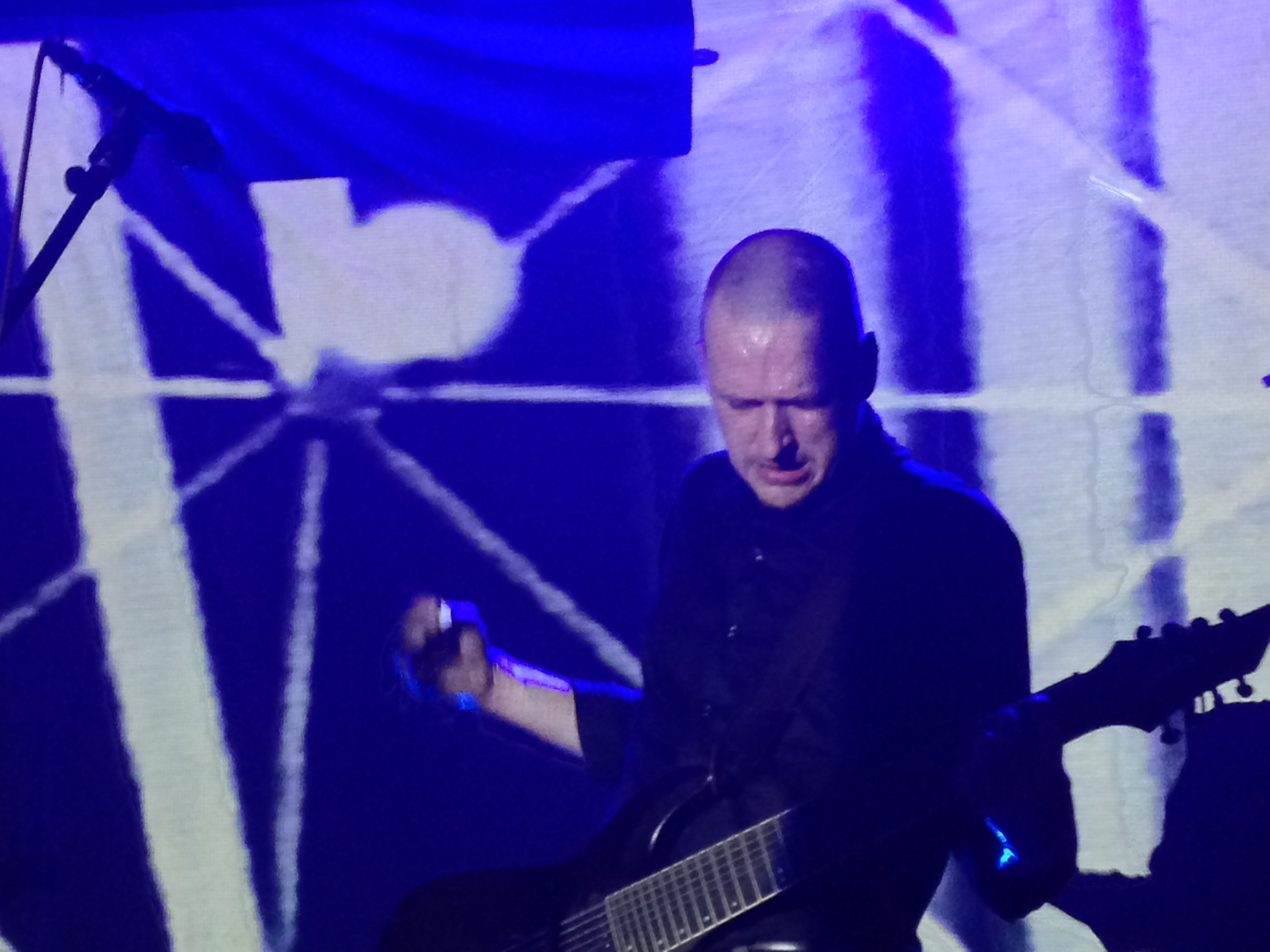
Broadrick performing live with an eight-string guitar on 17 September 2015

Following a number of tours in support of A World Lit Only by Fire and an attempt at an In Dub remix release with Parsons providing additional drumming, Godflesh returned to the studio in 2016 for a new album. Post Self, the band's eighth studio album, was released on 17 November 2017, shortly after another performance of Streetcleaner in its entirety. Unlike A World Lit Only by Fire's focus on making a bombastic comeback, Post Self proved more introspective and moody. Most of the traditional metal riffs were dropped in favour of atmosphere, noise and experimentation. Post Self received similar high praise as its predecessor, and both appeared on several publications' year-end lists. After the release of Post Self, Broadrick avoided interviews, hoping to give listeners time to form their own opinions on the music and to retain some of the album's "mystique". Godflesh embarked on a few brief tours and played scattered festivals, including Roadburn 2018 where they performed all of Selfless live for the first and only time. Broadrick spent a month reprogramming the album's percussion from scratch since the original drum parts no longer existed. In an interview with French magazine New Noise, Broadrick said that Selfless was the last Godflesh album he wanted to play in its entirety.

A compilation album titled Long Live the New Flesh was released in July 2021. The album featured most of the band's studio material released since reformation in 2010. A shortened digital edition, New Flesh in Dub Vol 1, comprising the majority of Godflesh's reformation-era remixes alongside two otherwise unreleased tracks from the Post Self sessions, was released ahead of the full compilation.

=== Purge, Decay and final studio album (2022–present) ===
Godflesh had started work on a new album by January 2022, and a live album documenting the performance of Pure at Roadburn 2013, titled Pure : Live, was released in November that year. The band's ninth studio album, Purge, was released in June 2023, preceded by the singles "Nero" and "Land Lord". On 6 December 2024, A World Lit Only by Dub, a remix album of 2014's A World Lit Only by Fire that had been in the works since 2013, was released. On 30 October 2025 at the Scala in London, the band supported this release with what would be their final live performance; Godflesh played two sets, the first of which consisted of dub versions of their songs. This was the second remix set the band had played after the 1997 show at The Garage.

On 5 March 2026, Broadrick announced that he had undergone open abdominal surgery for an inguinal hernia. Due to complications that have left him unable to perform the intense vocal style required for the band's music, he stated that Godflesh would no longer perform live. Following the release of their penultimate album, Decay, on 25 September 2026, Broadrick intends to complete the final Godflesh album, which has already been written, tentatively titled The End. After that, Godflesh releases will focus on dub mixes and previously recorded live performances. Broadrick also has plans for a new solo project.

== Style and influence ==
=== Musical style and legacy ===
Drawing inspiration from early industrial and noise groups such as Throbbing Gristle and Whitehouse, as well as from ambient musician Brian Eno, noise rock band Swans, post-punk innovators Killing Joke and also Siouxsie and the Banshees and Public Image Ltd., fellow Birmingham heavy metal band Black Sabbath and a wide range of hip hop artists such as Public Enemy, Eric B. & Rakim and Run-DMC, (Note: Influences on Godflesh: Throbbing Gristle; Whitehouse; Brian Eno; Swans; Killing Joke; Siouxsie and the Banshees; Public Image Ltd.; Big Black; Black Sabbath; Public Enemy, Eric B. & Rakim and Run-DMC) Godflesh were among the pioneers of both industrial metal and post-metal and are considered a significant experimental metal and extreme metal band. Broadrick and Green have both distanced themselves from the industrial metal title, though they concede that the label is accurate on a literal level. They consider Godflesh to be a continuation of post-punk, specifically in regard to furthering Killing Joke's sound.

Despite being considered a pioneer of industrial metal, Broadrick has stated that he finds that term to be "limiting," and further said that "I've always maintained that we're a rock band. We never came up with the term industrial metal; it was just that we were influenced as much by Throbbing Gristle as we were Black Sabbath."

"Predominance"
From Pure (1992), "Predominance" showcases Godflesh's percussive repetition.

Godflesh's sound is characterised by a combination of programmed drum machine beats, percussive bass and distorted heavy metal guitar. Though the band would later employ human drumming for Songs of Love and Hate and Hymns in 1996 and 2001 respectively (a decision that Broadrick believed compromised the group's musical identity), Godflesh's early sound was dominated by artificial, stiff drum loops and an uncommon focus on bass. On those early influential releases, the rhythms, synths and samples were credited to "Machine" or "Machines" despite being done by Broadrick. Initially, the employment of mechanical percussion was done out of necessity. When Broadrick rejoined Fall of Because with Green to form Godflesh, the beats he desired were too difficult to play acoustically, so he instead used an Alesis HR-16 drum machine; this decision would prove defining for both Godflesh and for industrial metal at large. Godflesh's writing and recording process is guided by Broadrick and generally happens without the aid of a professional studio or producer. According to Broadrick, "50% of the Godflesh material was often born from rhythms and grooves", and he called the hands-on recording process "primitive".

About the band's tuning, Green said in a 1997 interview, "We would just tune down as low as we could. We couldn't hear anything! But eventually we had to pick a pitch to tune to, so we chose C-sharp. It's low and heavy, but you can still make out the notes." For the early Godflesh albums, the guitars are tuned down to B. Starting with 2014's A World Lit Only by Fire, Broadrick started using an 8-string guitar tuned to F sharp.

Mike Patton of bands Faith No More and Mr. Bungle is a fan of Godflesh's sound, calling them "ridiculously heavy" and "one of the few bands that can make you wonder whether or not your batteries are running out on your stereo." Patton invited Broadrick to join Faith No More as guitarist after Jim Martin left the band in 1993. He was also asked to join Danzig shortly after Godflesh toured the U.S. with them and Type O Negative in 1994. In both instances, Broadrick declined the offer in favour of continuing to reside in the United Kingdom and work on his own music. Other artists such as Metallica, Fear Factory, Korn, Isis, Neurosis, Pelican, Prurient, Helmet, Prong, Nailbomb, Code Orange, Mortiis, Devin Townsend and Converge were inspired by Godflesh, (Note: Godflesh's influence on other bands: Metallica; Fear Factory; Korn; Isis; Neurosis; Pelican; Prurient; Nine Inch Nails; Helmet; Prong; Nailbomb; Code Orange; Mortiis; Danzig; Devin Townsend; Converge; Faith No More) and in 2014 MetalSucks wrote, "Everyone from Nine Inch Nails to Fear Factory to Batillus probably owes these dudes a couple of checks". Despite acclaim among critics and fellow musicians, Godflesh have only experienced minimal commercial success; in 2002, shortly before the band dissolved, Broadrick said he had no illusions about selling out stadiums. The goal of Godflesh, according to him, was simply to put out good albums.

=== Visual style ===
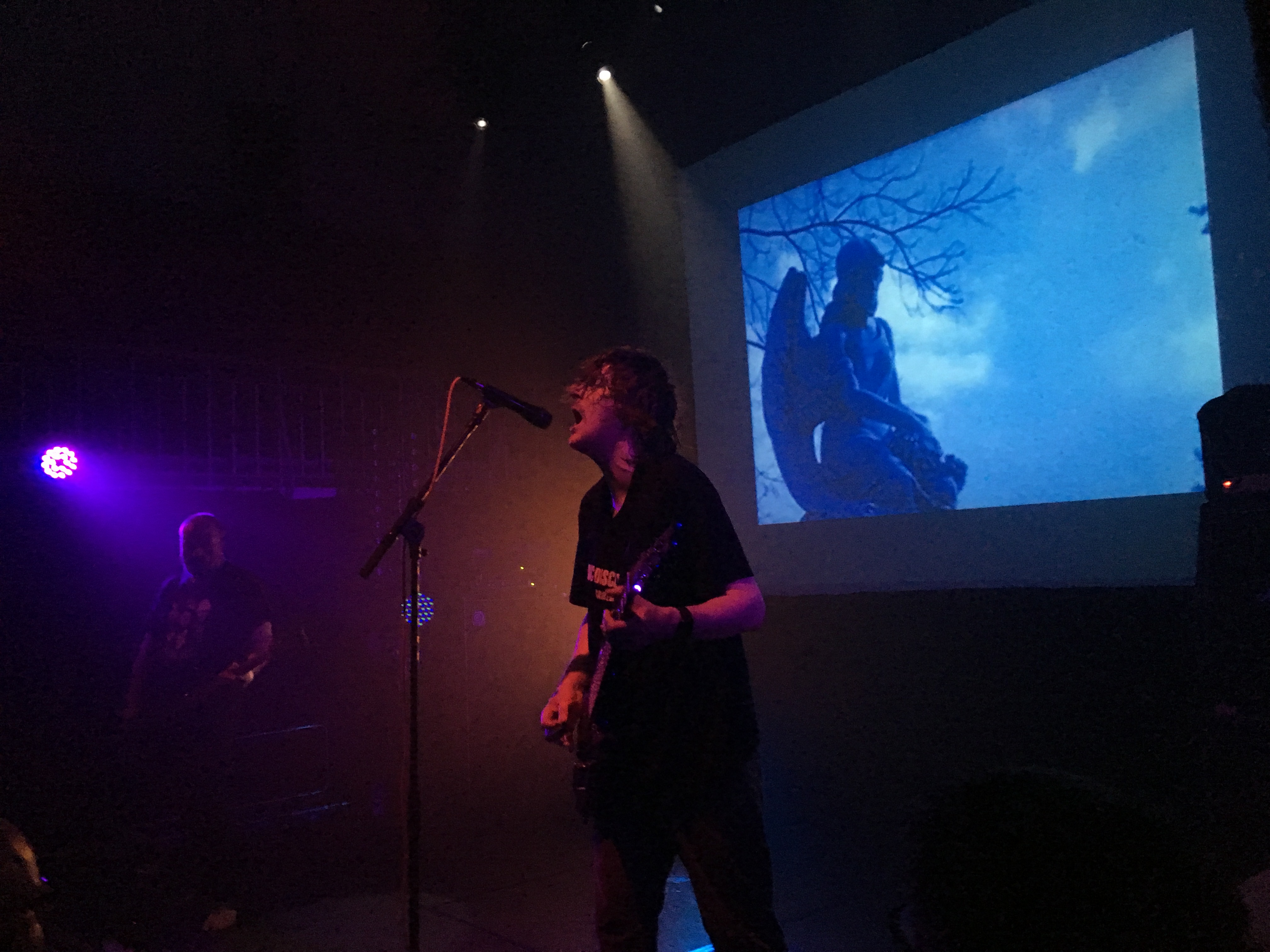
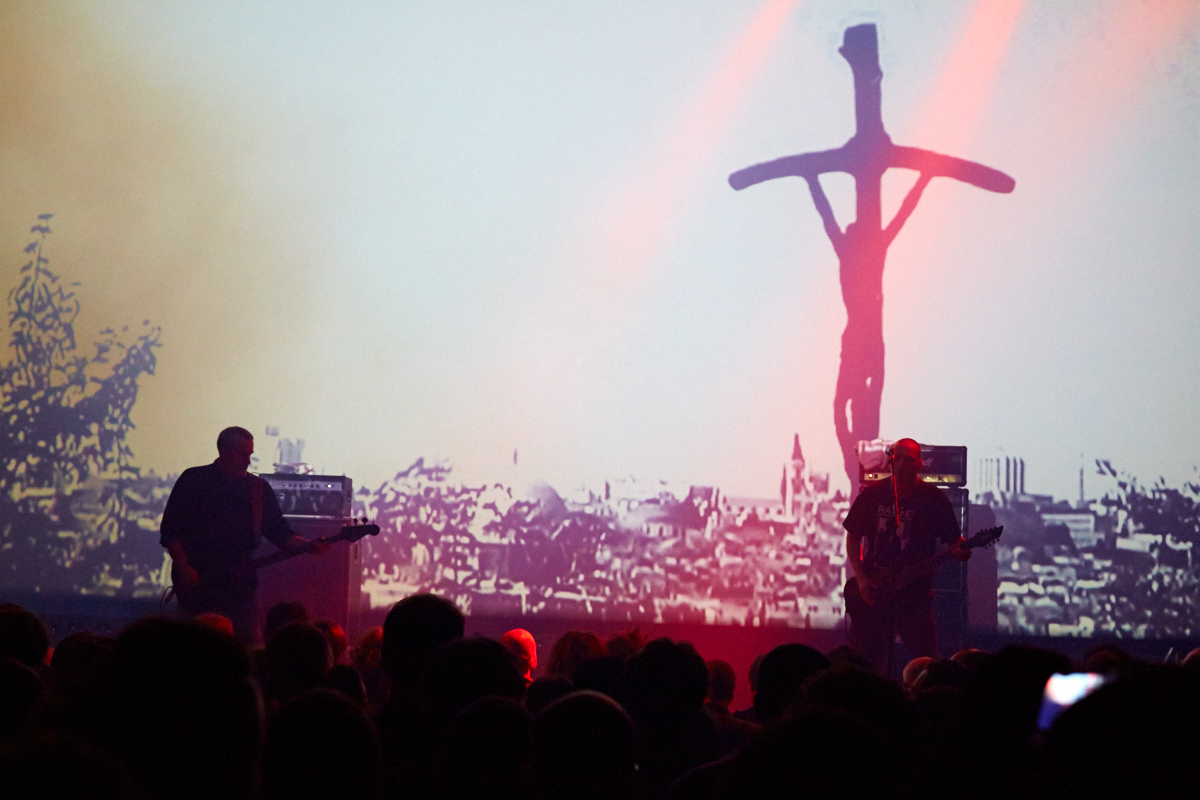
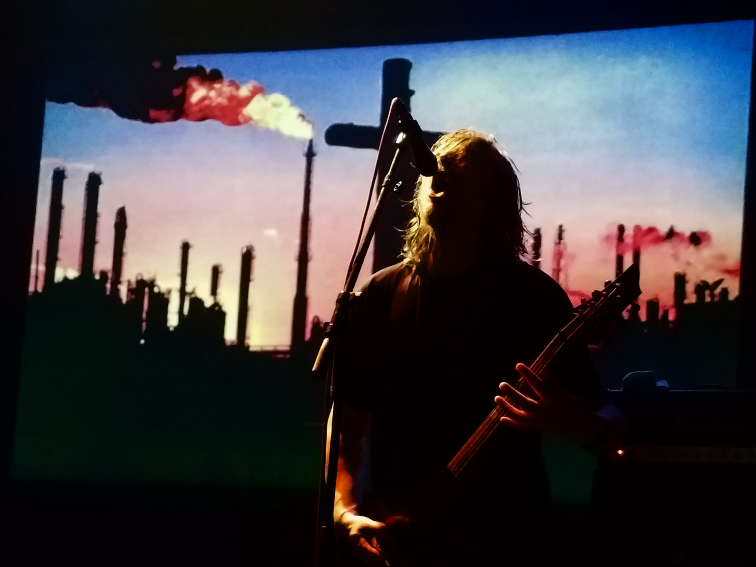
Three examples of imagery typically projected on the backdrop during a Godflesh live performance

Being interested in horror and art house cinema, both Broadrick and Green incorporated many references to such films in Godflesh. The image on the front of 1988's Godflesh EP is a still from the 1966 John Frankenheimer film Seconds. Streetcleaner's cover is an image from the movie Altered States, a 1980 horror film by director Ken Russell, and the album's liner notes feature frames from David Lynch's Eraserhead (1977). The cover of Merciless is derived from the 1943 experimental film Meshes of the Afternoon, by Maya Deren. Broadrick repeatedly cited another Russell movie, The Devils (1971), as an influence of Godflesh's sound. Additionally, Godflesh appeared in the 1995 film Hideaway; during one of the movie's club scenes, Broadrick and Green can be seen playing onstage in the background, performing the song "Nihil" from Cold World.

Apart from cinema, Christian iconography helped inform Godflesh's visual style. Broadrick, originally anti-religious, found churches and their related imagery intimidating. In a 2006 interview, Broadrick said, "The imagery of religion, the feeling of like when you walk into a cathedral, the huge feeling of intimidation that you get from Christian religion – everything to do with religion I find totally obsessive." Broadrick described the worship setting as "suffocating" and "claustrophobic", saying it played a large role in forming Godflesh's style. The covers of Streetcleaner, Songs of Love and Hate, Love and Hate in Dub and A World Lit Only by Fire showcase such Christian imagery, as do Godflesh's live performances.

=== Vocal style and lyrical themes ===
"No Body"
From Post Self (2017), "No Body" showcases Broadrick's usual growl vocals submerged below noise.

"Frail"
From Songs of Love and Hate (1996), "Frail" showcases Broadrick's singing.

Early Godflesh vocals came in the form of screaming and death growls, and lyrics were scarce. Over time, Broadrick's delivery expanded to include singing, softness and moments of melody, all things that he would further explore with Jesu. Songs of Love and Hate and Hymns saw Godflesh's greatest profusion of vocals, while A World Lit Only by Fire and Post Self returned to Broadrick's predominantly succinct style. Broadrick's voice has been compared to Killing Joke singer Jaz Coleman's, a self-proclaimed vocal influence in addition to Kelvin Morris from Discharge and Michael Gira's early work with Swans. Godflesh lyrics are cryptic, bleak and generally sparse. Many of Godflesh's themes deal with inner conflict, violence, destruction, corruption, religion, loss, emotional extremes and fear. In 2012, Broadrick stated that singing was "a necessary evil" to him and that he never felt he could do it properly; the role of vocalist came to him simply because he was bold enough to approach the microphone.

In a 1990 review of the band's self-titled EP, Simon Reynolds of Melody Maker noted that Godflesh's music rebelled against the overt masculinity found in most metal; he wrote, "Rather than feminise themselves, they'd rather their masculinity was defeated, their strong bodies crushed and pulverised". Broadrick echoed this sentiment in the same year, insulting the "celebration of male ego that comes with most metal" and distancing Godflesh from masculine expression; he reinforced his stance in 2012, saying, "Godflesh isn't that all-conquering male thing, on stage with a fucking sword and saying they're going to 'rape and pillage'. Pure comedy." Throughout the group's career, Broadrick continued to emphasise the defensive quality of the music over its offensive quality, citing aggression as a shield against the traumas of the world.

Broadrick has taken significant lyrical and thematic inspiration from Leonard Cohen. Both artists have an album titled Songs of Love and Hate, and the Godflesh track "Avalanche Master Song" combines two Cohen song titles. In the song "Mothra" (from Pure), Godflesh borrows the lyrics "Your pain is no credential here / It's just the shadow of my wound" from the song "Avalanche" on the aforementioned Cohen album.

== Live performances ==
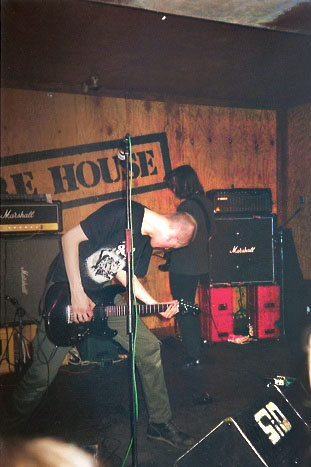
Godflesh performing at the Wherehouse in Derby on 25 March 1992

Godflesh typically perform as a duo, with Green playing bass and Broadrick providing both guitar and vocals while the percussion is relayed over the speakers, often at a notably high volume. This lineup, however, has not been constant over the band's career. In concerts supporting Streetcleaner, Neville occasionally came onstage and played second guitar, and Hampson did the same for Pure. For the tours in support of Selfless, Songs of Love and Hate and Hymns, the band played with a live drummer, though Broadrick believed this incorporation to be a misstep. In a 2014 interview, he clarified that the percussive additions of Mantia and Parsons brought "something amazing" to Godflesh, but that the band's name should have changed so as to not dilute the original focus on machine drums. A handful of other musicians have briefly performed with Godflesh: Mick Harris in 1991; Diarmuid Dalton in 1997, 1999 and 2001; Steve Hough in 1997 and 1999 and both Paul Raven and Jaz Coleman of Killing Joke in 2002.

The band's stage show is, like their music, minimal and focused. Godflesh only occasionally employ a smoke machine, and the lights are generally static; Toby Cook of The Quietus highlighted this unusual approach in a review of a 2014 concert, writing, "Over-lit and with no dry ice in sight, they look alarmingly exposed". Images of industrial urban sprawls, Christian iconography and apocalyptic landscapes cycle through the projector. The music itself is presented as noisy and overwhelming, with some critics calling the sound even more cacophonous and dissonant than the band's studio work. Gaps between songs are normally filled with feedback, and the band rarely speak to the crowd. In response to a question about Godflesh's laconic stage presence, Broadrick said, "I don't communicate with people. We just make music. We come on stage and I don't say anything to anyone. And that alone made people really mad. I find it really bizarre. I can't believe that people would disown a band because I'm not telling them how much I'm going to kick their asses tonight."

In a 2011 interview, Broadrick called playing live "a necessary evil" that is "so rarely right and so frequently wrong", but at the same time said that Godflesh "is probably even more so a live band than it is a recorded band" because those imperfections only work to accentuate the grinding chaos of the music (which is something that critics have noticed, too). Broadrick went on to say that it was the "rage" of Godflesh that made it work in a live setting.

== Members ==
=== Current lineup ===
- Justin Broadrick – guitars, vocals, programming, electronics (1988–2002, 2009–present), drums (1984–1987)
- B. C. Green – bass (1982–1987, 1988–2001, 2009–present), vocals (1982–1984)

=== Former members ===
- Paul Neville – guitars (1982–1987, 1989–1991), vocals, tape (1984–1987)
- Robert Hampson – guitars (1991–1992)
- Bryan Mantia – drums (1994–1996)
- Ted Parsons – drums (1996–2002)
- Paul Raven – bass (2002; died 2007)

=== Former touring musicians ===
- Mick Harris – drums (1991)
- Steve Hough – guitars (1997, 1999)
- Diarmuid Dalton – keyboards (1997, 1999, 2001)

== Discography ==
- Streetcleaner (1989)
- Pure (1992)
- Selfless (1994)
- Songs of Love and Hate (1996)
- Us and Them (1999)
- Hymns (2001)
- A World Lit Only by Fire (2014)
- Post Self (2017)
- Purge (2023)
- Decay (2026)
- The End (2027)
