= Robert Hampson =

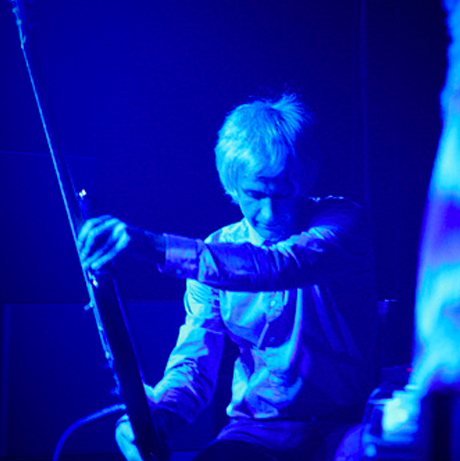
- Robert Hampson playing with Cindytalk in 2011

Background information
- Born: Joshua Robert Hampson; 10 June 1965 (age 60); Bromley, London, England
- Genres: Space rock; drone rock; post-rock; dark ambient; industrial metal
- Instruments: Vocals; guitar

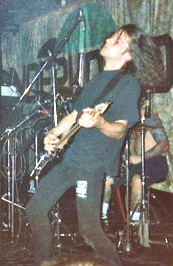
Robert Hampson performing with Godflesh on 10 October 1991

Joshua Robert Hampson (born 10 June 1965) is an English musician and composer. He is the lead musician in the bands Loop, which he co-founded in London in 1985 with his then-girlfriend Becky "Bex" Stewart, and the experimental project Main which he founded with Scott Dawson.

== Music career ==
After Loop disbanded, Hampson formed the more experimental Main with fellow Loop member Scott Dowson, releasing several albums and EPs on Beggars Banquet Records. Although a strong signature in the early material of Main, the guitar was slowly eroded from the stable sounds Hampson and Dowson produced, together with field recordings and other electro-acoustic sounds. When Dowson left the line-up in 1996, Main became a solo project for Hampson, who then abandoned the guitar altogether, feeling he had taken the instrument to such extremes that there was no longer any scope to create with it.

Between 1999 and 2003, he formed the electroacoustic duo Comae with Janek Schaefer touring in Europe, US, Japan, and released their self titled album on Rhiz Records.

He deactivated Main as a project in 2006, in an attempt to free himself of the restraints of critical and fan-based reviews, that still mentioned the guitar as the focal point of the material, even though he had not used it in many years. He was quoted in interviews as saying the guitar was a chain around his neck, and he was unhappy to be still so strongly associated with it.

Preferring to now explore other avenues of sound and its diffusion, especially multichannel systems for live performances, Hampson was invited by the Groupe de Recherches Musicales (GRM) in Paris to compose and perform on many occasions. He has also been associated with like-minded organisations and institutes around the world, exploring intricacies in sound composition.

In 2010, Hampson announced that he would be reactivating Main, which along with his solo acousmatic work, he will start performing and recording as a more collaborative process with fellow sound artists. A planned Loop reunion (of the Gilded Eternity line-up) later followed, in a statement by Hampson in April 2013.

Starting in 1996, Robert Hampson also seldomly released tracks and remixes (Bowery Electric, Veronica Vasicka, Eros) under the Chasm moniker.

== Discography ==
on Editions Mego

- Five Mountains of Fire / Antarctica Ends Here - Cindytalk / Robert Hampson 10-inch vinyl only, limited to 500 copies.
- Répercussions (eMEGO 132) CD + 5.1 DVD
- Signaux (eMEGO 148.1)
- Suspended Cadences (eMEGO 148.2)
- Ablation (as Main with Stephan Mathieu) (eMEGO 160)

with Godflesh

- Cold World (1991)
- Pure (1992)

on Touch

- Vectors - Robert Hampson CD

on Rhiz

- Comae - s/t CD {Robert Hampson with Janek Schaefer} 2001

on Reactor (Loop re-issues)

- Heaven's End Fade Out: A Gilded Eternity – studio albums, remastered two-disc sets with extra material and Peel Sessions
- The World in Your Eyes – three-disc set, compilation of singles, EPs and rarities
