= G. C. Green =

English musician

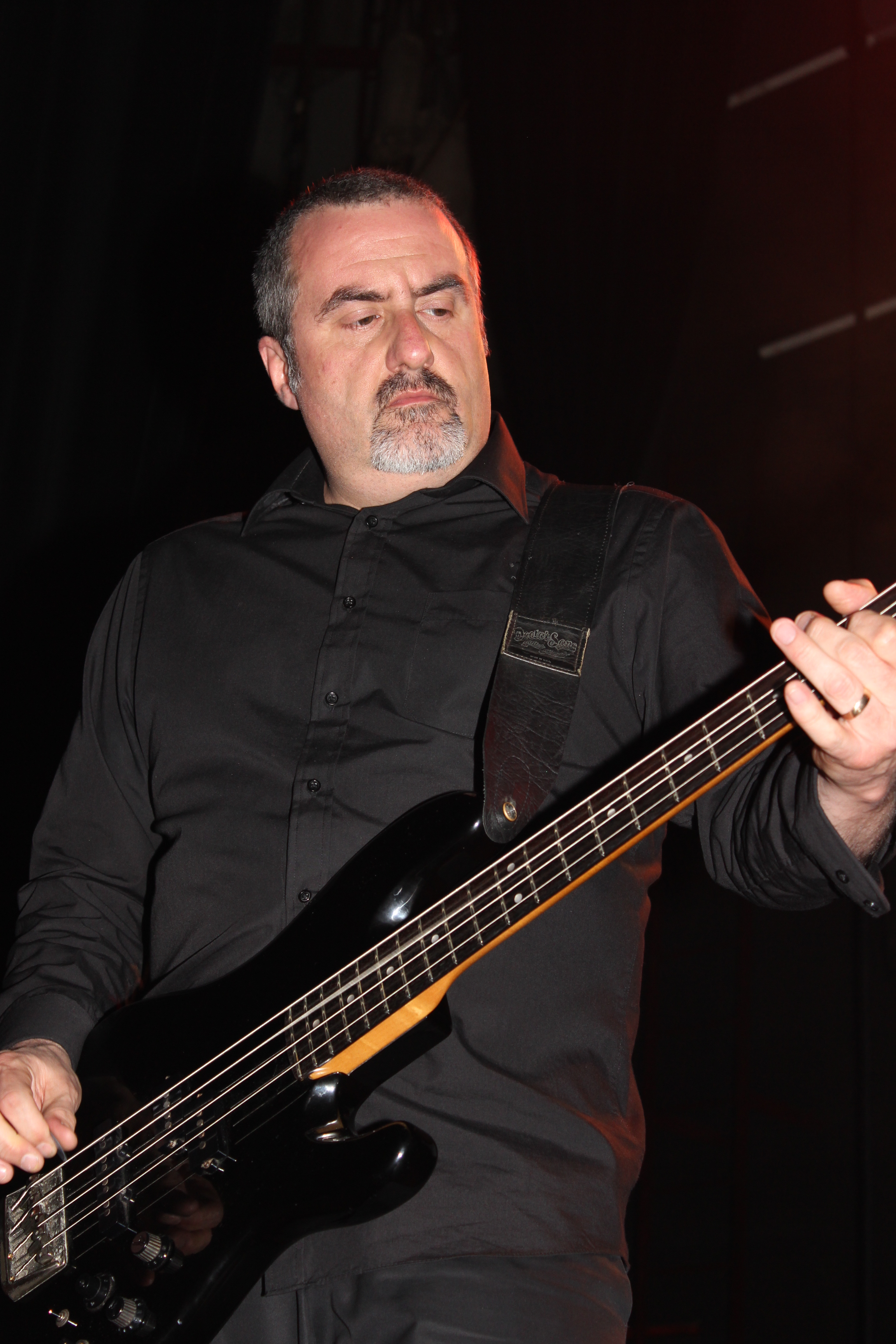
- Green performing with Godflesh in 2014

Background information
- Also known as: Vitriol; Ben Green; B. C. Green
- Born: Ben George Christian Green
- Origin: Birmingham, England
- Genres: Industrial metal; post-punk; experimental
- Occupation: Musician
- Instruments: Bass guitar; synthesizer
- Years active: 1982–2001; 2010–present
- Member of: Godflesh

Ben George Christian Green (born 1964), known professionally as G. C. Green and B. C. Green, is an English musician who is the bass guitarist and a founding member of the industrial metal band Godflesh.

== Biography ==
A native of Birmingham, Green was involved in the city's post-punk and goth scenes in early 1980s and was close friends with musicians such as Paul Neville and Diarmuid Dalton. He formed his first band, OPD ("Officially Pronounced Dead"), in 1982 with Neville. The band usually rehearsed at Green's or Neville's house. They changed their name to Fall of Because after the Killing Joke song of the same name in 1985.

Initially, they used a basic drum machine, with Neville playing guitar and Green on bass and vocals; the duo were writing songs influenced by the Cure's Seventeen Seconds and Faith albums. After meeting a 15-year-old Justin Broadrick in 1984 outside their local council estate shops, above which Broadrick lived with his parents, they started their friendship over their mutual admiration for the Stranglers, and other punk bands. Soon, Broadrick started playing drums in the band, and the three of them began writing songs that were influenced by bands such as Swans and Sonic Youth, whilst still retaining the psychedelic overtones that was inherent in the earlier Fall of Because music. Green was also introduced to various artists such as Throbbing Gristle, Whitehouse and SPK at this time by Broadrick.

In 1986, they recorded a demo, Extirpate, at Rich Bitch studios in Birmingham and sold a few copies to friends and other musicians in Birmingham. The band also played several gigs at The Mermaid public house in Birmingham with the likes of Napalm Death, Heresy and Amebix. In 1987, Broadrick left Fall of Because to join Head of David.

When he was sacked from Head of David in 1988, he and Green, who were sharing a flat together at the time, formed Godflesh. Throughout its career, Godflesh has released eight records and pioneered the industrial metal genre. After recording Godflesh's sixth album, Hymns, in October 2001, Green left Godflesh. He was replaced by Prong bassist Paul Raven. Nevertheless, the band disbanded in 2002 in the midst of their European tour. In following years, Green, who supported himself with various professions including as a social worker, disappeared from the music scene until 2010. He has significant hearing loss.

Green's only solo album, I-VII, was released under his "Vitriol" moniker in 1998 through Neurot Recordings. It was recorded in 1995.

Green was married in 2010. Green and Broadrick also reunited Godflesh in 2010 and began touring. The band's seventh album, and the first since the reunion, A World Lit Only by Fire, was released in 2014. Their eighth album, Post Self, followed in 2017.

== Artistry ==
=== Tone, playing style and influences ===
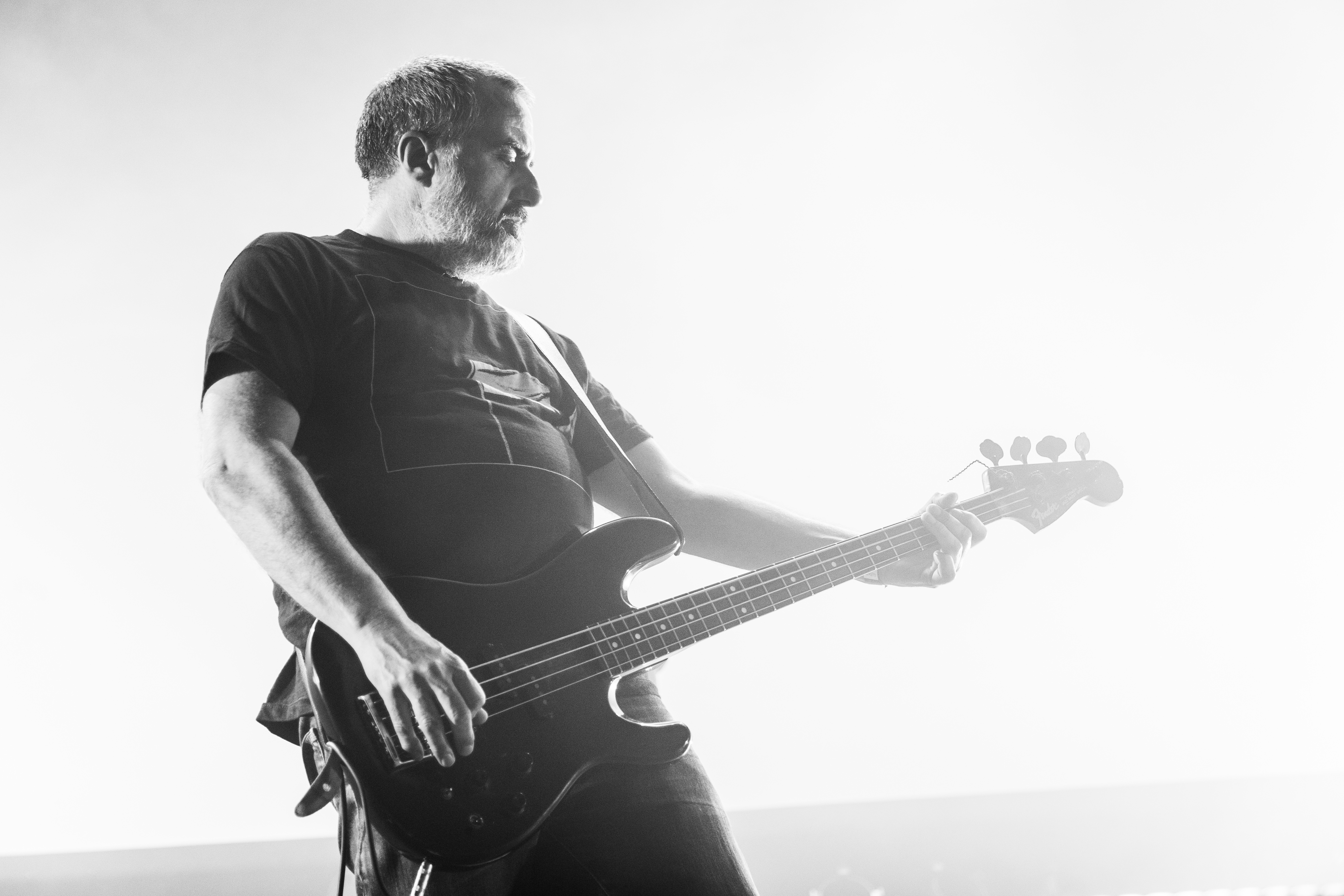
Green performing with Godflesh at Roadburn 2018

Rob Haynes of The Quietus described Green's bass sound as "like the noise a glacier might make as it remorselessly ground a mountain to dust." Green's basslines were essential in Godflesh's music and "freed up Broadrick to conjur the atmosphere with his droning guitar sound." Green also adapted his style to Godflesh's various influences, including electronic music, dub, breakbeat and hip hop.

Green describes his sound as "heavy, downtuned and driving" and tunes his bass to B standard. He occasionally plays chords to "give extra weight and depth" and sometimes uses slapping to "add a percussive tone and physicality." His favourite bass guitarists include Brian Wilson of the Beach Boys, Jean-Jacques Burnel of the Stranglers, Paul McCartney of the Beatles and Dennis Dunaway, the original bassist for Alice Cooper Band.

=== Equipment ===
Green's equipment as adapted from Bass Guitar magazine profile:

- Bass guitars: Fender Jazz Bass Special
- Effects: Boss HM-2 Heavy Metal pedal
- Amps: Ampeg SVT

== Discography ==
Green performing with Godflesh at The Metro Lounge in Long Branch, New Jersey in November 1996

With Godflesh

With Fall of Because

- Extirpate (1986)
- Life Is Easy (1999)

With Final

- Two (1996)
- Solaris (1996)
- The First Millionth of a Second (1996)
- Urge/Fail (1996)
- Flow/Openings (1996)

As Vitriol

- I-VII (2001)

Other contributions

- Painkiller – Buried Secrets EP (1992)
- Cain – Cain (1992)
- 16–17 – Gyatso (1993)
- Main – Motion Pool (1994)
