= Lossow =

Lossow may refer to:

== People ==
- Otto von Lossow, a Bavarian general who was involved in the Beer Hall Putsch
- Heinrich Lossow, a German artist and pornographer
- William Lossow, the architect of the Leipzig Hauptbahnhof and the Staatsschauspiel Dresden
- Jim von Lossow, a golfer and the 1986 winner of the Pacific Northwest PGA Championship
- Rodney Lossow, an American football player

=== Fictional ===
- Captain Lossow, a character in Sharpe's Gold

== Places ==
- Lossow Castle, a gord at Frankfurt Oder
