= Shut Me Down =

Shut Me Down may refer to:

- "Shut Me Down", a 2012 song by Ne-Yo from R.E.D.
- "Shut Me Down", a 2014 song by Godflesh from A World Lit Only by Fire
