= Scandals in art =

Reactions to works of art

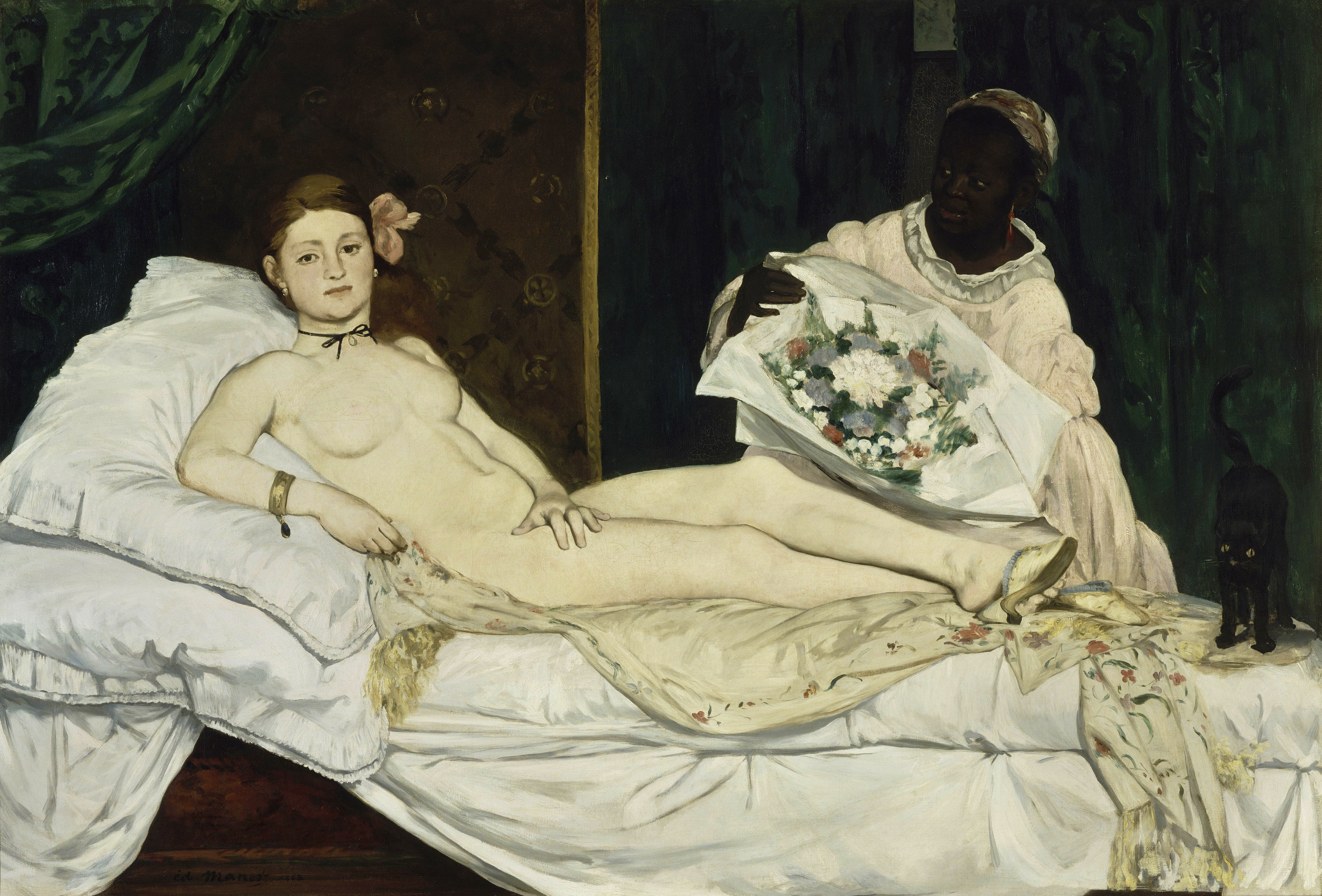
Olympia by Manet (1863)

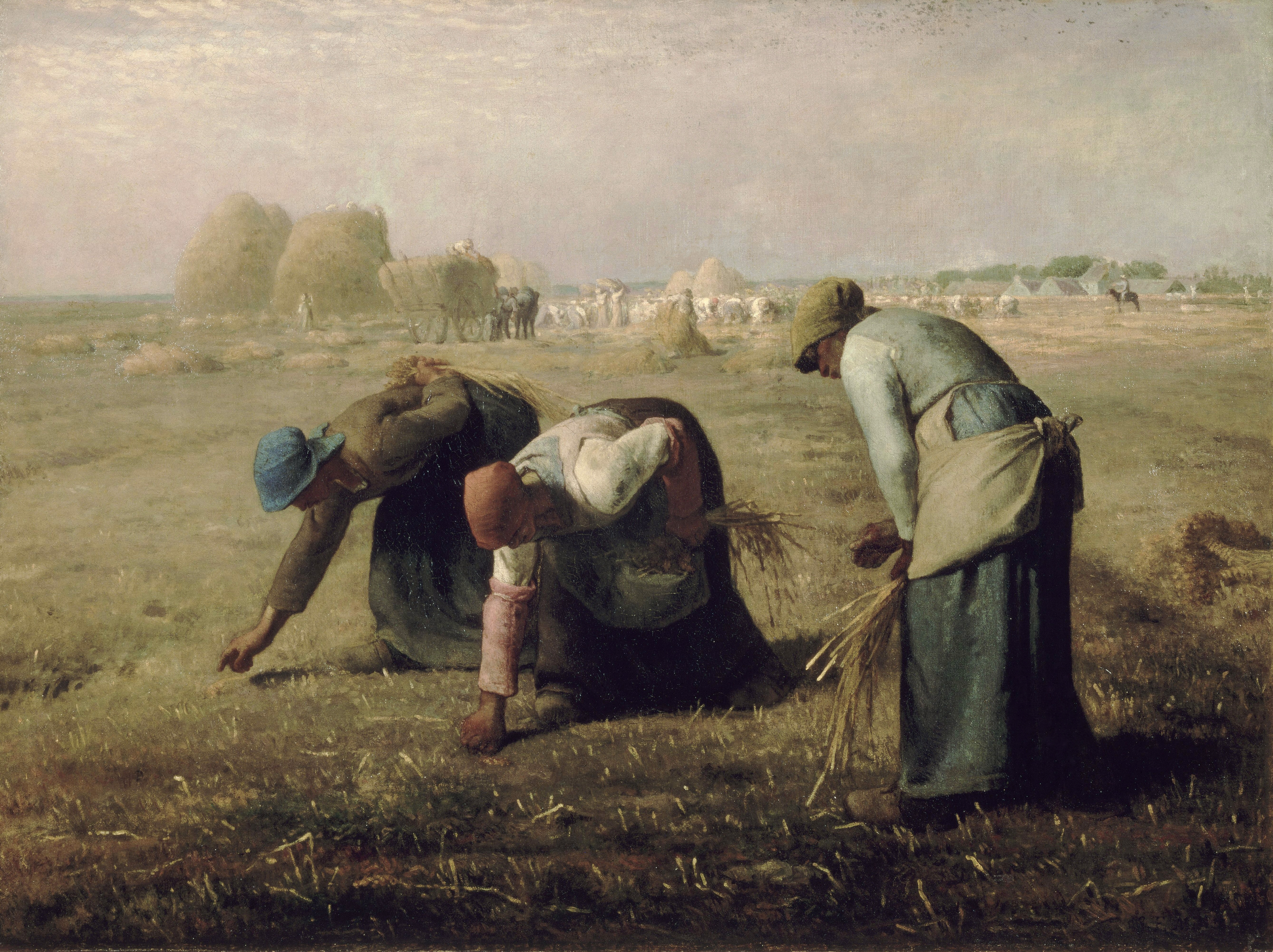
Upper-class Parisians felt threatened by the dignified size of the canvas used to depict The Gleaners by Jean-François Millet in 1857.

Scandals in art occur when members of the public are shocked or offended by a work of art at the time of its first exhibition or publication, (e.g. visual art, literature, scenic design or music).

The provocativeness of the scandal may relate to a controversial subject or style, being context-sensitive, according to the personality of the artist, along with transient political, religious, social, and moral factors. The Gleaners by Jean-François Millet seems innocuous today, but the large size of a painting, generally reserved for religious and mythological subjects, depicting the rural poor was seen by the upper class as an endorsement of the type of grievances that had erupted in the revolutionary violence of 1848, just 9 years earlier.

In contrast, the 90 cans of Artist's Shit (Italian: Merda d'artista, 1961), each labeled as containing 30 grams of feces of the artist Piero Manzoni, were regarded as social commentary rather than scandal. Collectors began buying the cans and they soon fetched high prices at auction; in August 2016, at an auction in Milan, can #69 sold for €275,000, including auction fees.

== History ==
=== 16th century ===
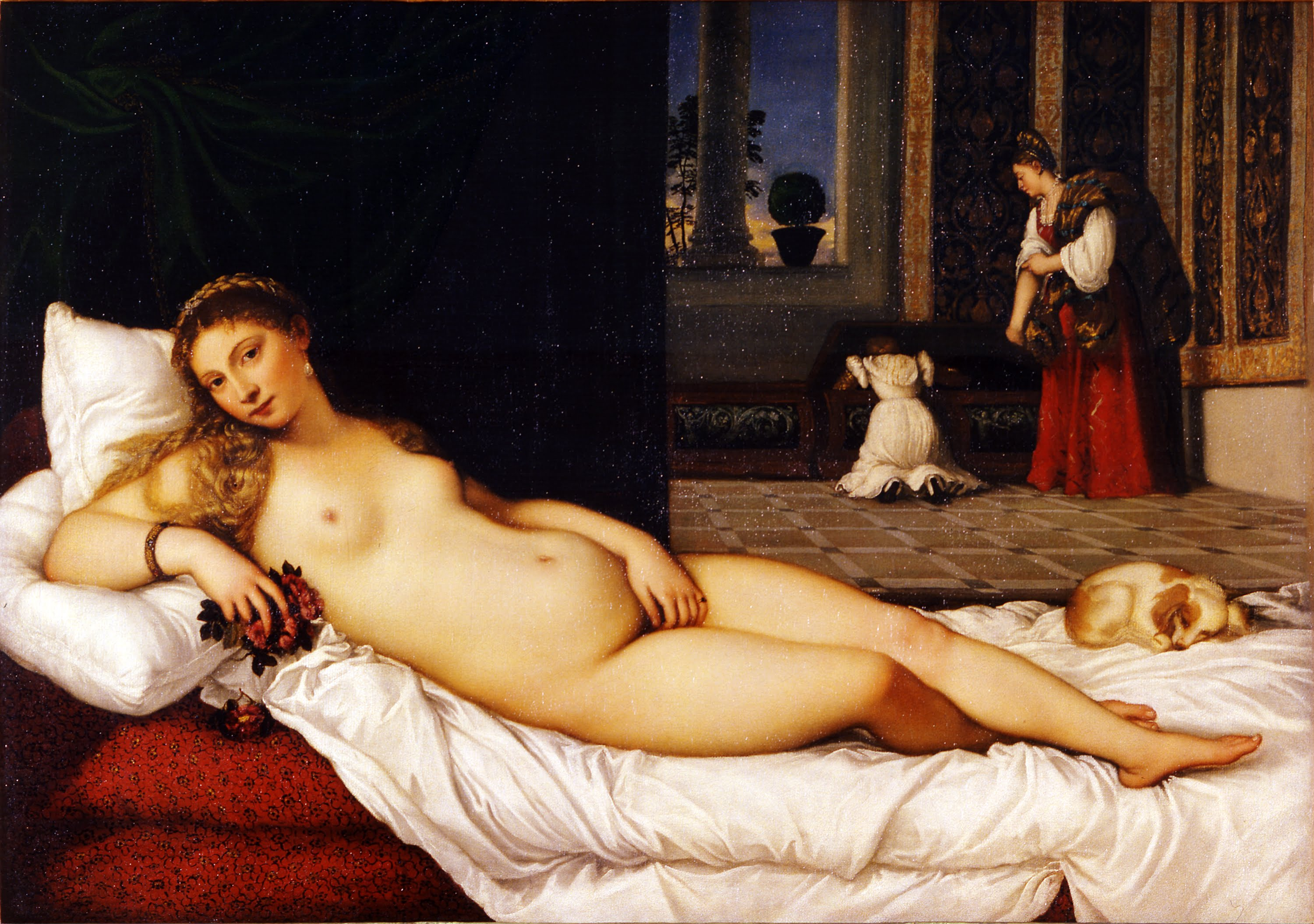
Venus of Urbino

Venus of Urbino by Titian scandalized through its profane character. Originally, the young nude woman not identified as a goddess; rather, she was reclining in a setting that could be identified as the bedchamber of Guidobaldo della Rovere, who had commissioned the painting. She was deliberately called "Venus" by Giorgio Vasari to minimize the scandal, in the context of a decree issued by the Council of Trent, imputing to artists the responsibility for everything arising from their creative representations.

During 1536–1541, the profusion of nude figures in The Last Judgment raised the ire of religious authorities. In spite of this, the work continued under Popes Paul III and Julius III, but in 1564, under the order of the Council of Trent, the genitalia were painted over by the Mannerist painter Daniele da Volterra, who became known as "Il Braghettone" ("the breeches maker").

The Feast in the House of Levi (1573) by Paolo Veronese was investigated by the Roman Inquisition, who asked, "Does it seem suitable to you, in the Last Supper of our Lord, to represent buffoons, drunken Germans, dwarfs, and other such absurdities?" and gave him three months to make changes. Veronese simply retitled it The Feast in the House of Levi.

=== 17th century ===
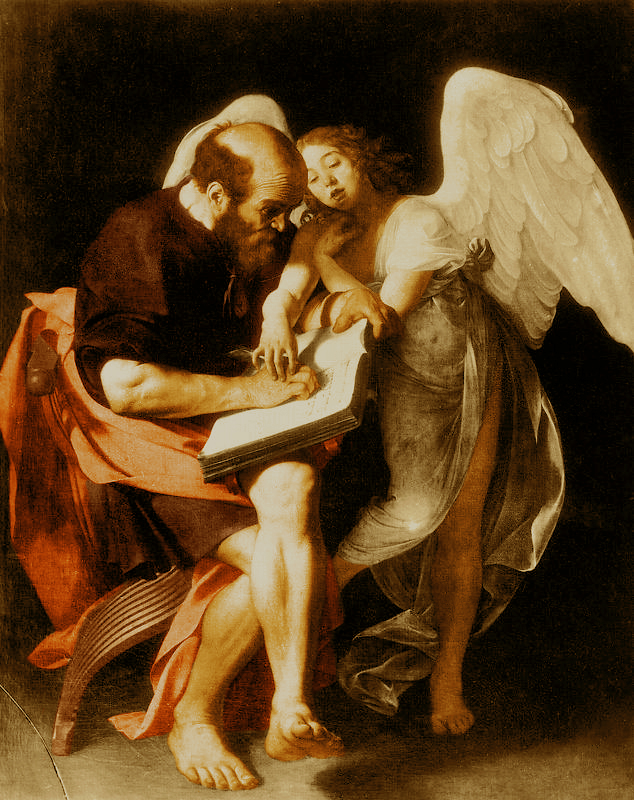
Saint Matthew and the Angel (1602) was refused for its triviality, the realism of the saint, and the ambiguity of the angel (original was destroyed in World War II)

Many of Caravaggio's works were rejected by his patrons, judged as being too vulgar, scandalous, like the first version of Saint Matthew and the Angel (1602). The canons of the Contarelli Chapel were appalled by the dirty legs and arms, minutely reproduced from the peasant model, and the ambiguity of the angel at his side. The painting was passed over, and Caravaggio was made to do a second that conformed better to the idealized representation preferred by the churchmen, The Inspiration of Saint Matthew. Caravaggio created a stir by his provocative Conversion of Saint Paul, with its prominent portrayal of the rump of the horse, who is poised to trample the saint. The Death of the Virgin (1606), intended for the Carmelite church of Santa Maria della Scala in Trastevere, Rome, was rejected as blasphemous.

=== 18th century ===
Girodet, Mlle Lange as Danae (1799)

At the Salon of 1799, Girodet exhibited a painting of Mademoiselle Lange which provoked the famous actress and merveilleuse. She wrote him a letter, "Please, Monsieur, do me the favor of withdrawing from the exhibit a portrait which, people say, does nothing for your glory, and which compromises my reputation for beauty." Furious, Girodet ripped up the original painting and made another, the Portrait of Mademoiselle Lange as Danaë, a satirical allegory in which the heads of most figures are crowned with peacock feathers, but her husband Michel-Jean Simons, a wealthy purveyor to the French army, is represented by a turkey, while golden coins fall from the sky.

In Spain, La Maja desnuda, painted sometime during 1797–1800 by Francisco Goya, shows a reclining nude, with pubic hair, looking at the viewer without any sense of shame. Although hung in a private room of Manuel Godoy, it came to the attention of the Spanish Inquisition in 1808, along with other works. Godoy and his curator, Don Francisco de Garivay, were brought before a tribunal and forced to reveal the artists behind the confiscated art works which were "so indecent and prejudicial to the public good."

=== 19th century ===
In 1819, to a public accustomed to historical tableaux painted in the Neoclassical style, Théodore Géricault presented the brooding Raft of the Medusa depicting survivors of a shipwreck in 1816, an embarrassment to the restored Bourbon monarchy, as Louis XVIII had appointed an incompetent nobleman as the captain for political reasons.

At the Salon of 1824, The Massacre at Chios, a large painting by Eugène Delacroix, supported state policy by favoring the Greeks, but his depiction of suffering devoid of heroism and glory was regarded as "a massacre of art" (Antoine-Jean Gros).

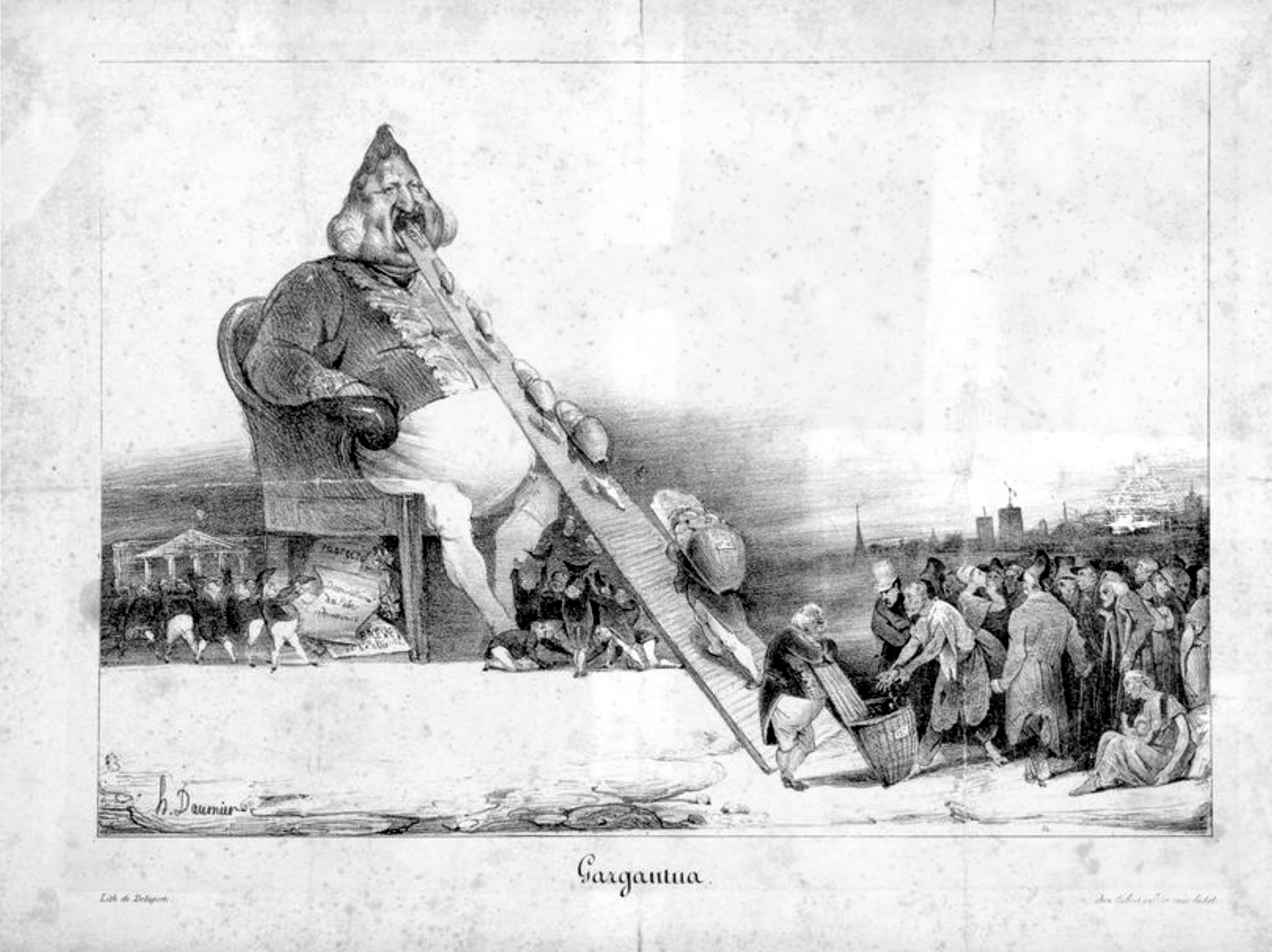
Lithograph of Gargantua, 1831

In 1831, the lithograph Gargantua by Honoré Daumier in the satirical periodical La Caricature, depicting Louis Philippe I as Gargantua, with scatological implications, resulted in six months of imprisonment for the artist.

At the Salon of 1850, the monumental painting A Burial At Ornans by Gustave Courbet was denounced for the unflattering faces of the mourners and their plainness. The "explosive reaction" brought Courbet instant fame.

Critics were divided in 1857 by The Gleaners painted by Jean-François Millet: some saw the gleaning women as a symbol of a popular uprising ("the scaffolds of 1793",) others complained about the realistic representation of the rural poor on a large canvas of the size reserved for religious scenes.

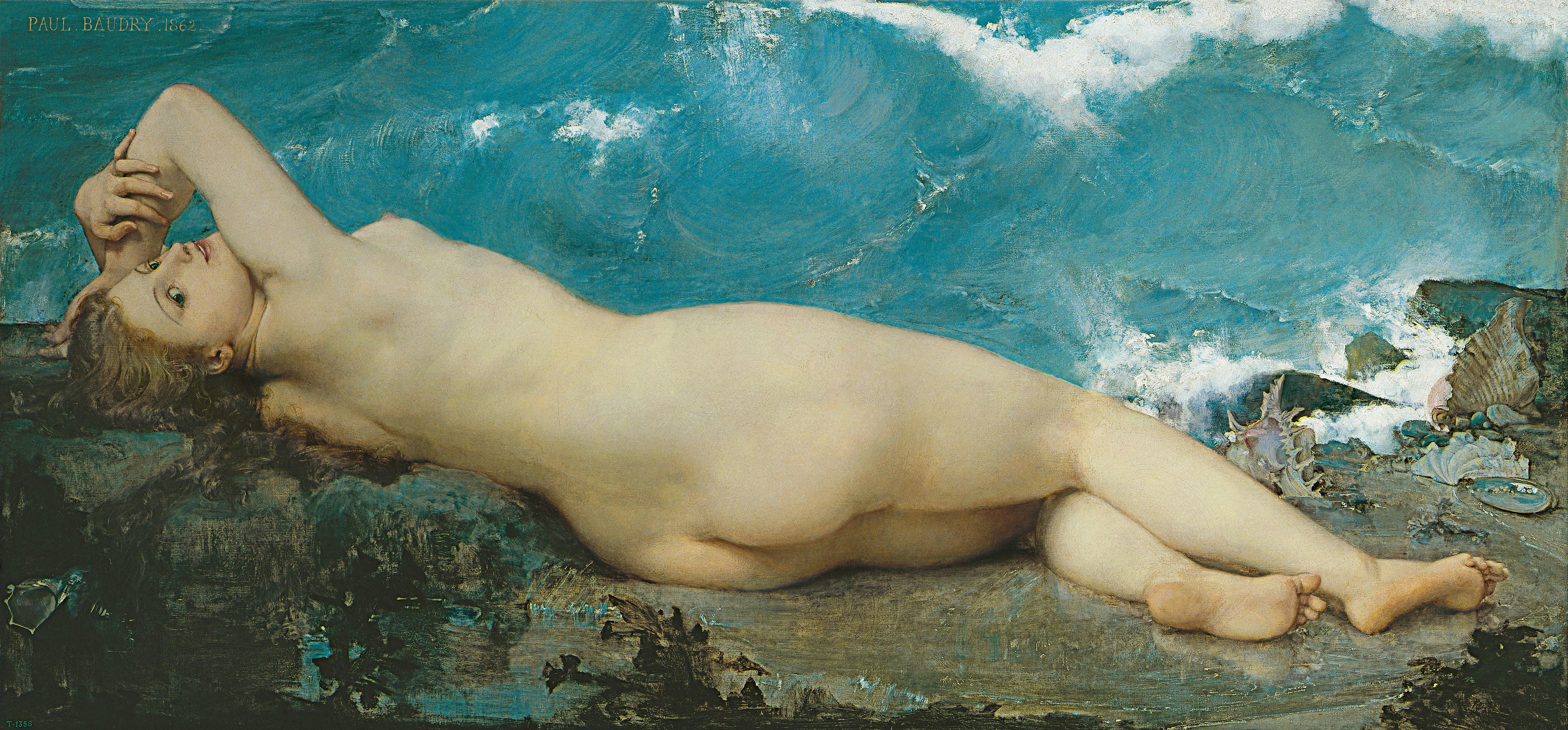
The Pearl and the Wave (Baudry, 1862)

The nudity in The Pearl and the Wave (1862) by Paul-Jacques-Aimé Baudry was judged too "annoying" in overly resembling an actual mortal rather than a goddess viewed from afar.

Painted in 1862–1863, Le Déjeuner sur l'herbe by Édouard Manet was exhibited at the Salon des Refusés in 1863, provoking scandal for both aesthetic and moral reasons.

Gustave Courbet's L'Origine du monde, painted in 1866, spent most of its time in private collections up until 1995, but continued to be polemical well into the 21st century.

In 1872, the painting Impression, Sunrise by Claude Monet was greeted with sarcasm for its audacity.

In 1874, the atmospheric Nocturne: Blue and Gold – Old Battersea Bridge by James Abbott McNeill Whistler was described as "flinging a pot of paint in the public's face" by critic John Ruskin; Whistler sued Ruskin for libel, and the case was brought to court in 1878.

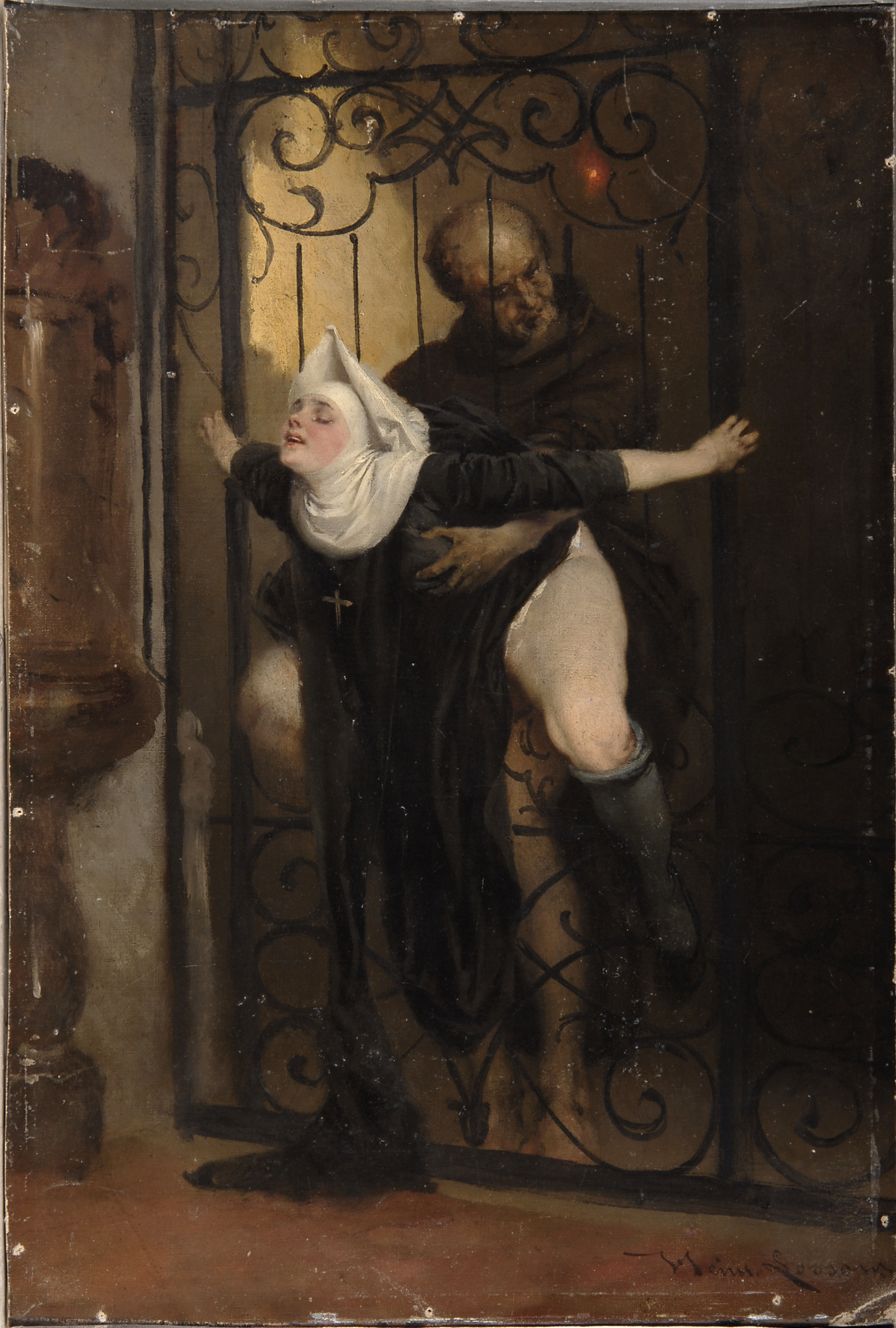
The Sin (Lossow, 1880)

In 1880, the erotic painting The Sin (or Die Versündigung) by Heinrich Lossow was the subject of significant controversy and public outrage in Germany due to its explicit nature and anti-clerical content, and it was formally condemned by the Catholic Church.

=== 20th century ===
- 1926–27 Brâncuși's Bird in Space is classified as a kitchen utensil, subject to duty, by U.S. Customs. "If that's art, hereafter I'm a bricklayer."
- 1934 Balthus's The Guitar Lesson, depicting a young girl nude below the waist in a sexual context, was rejected by MoMA.
- 1945 April, during the final days of World War II in Europe, Three Studies for Figures at the Base of a Crucifixion by the then unknown Irish-born artist Francis Bacon unnerved everyone who saw it, overnight turning Bacon into the most controversial painter in the country.
- 1987 Piss Christ, photograph by Andres Serrano of a small plastic crucifix submerged in a small glass tank of the artist's urine.

=== 21st century ===
- 2000 Wim Delvoye: Cloaca, mechanism that makes feces.
- 2001 Him by Maurizio Cattelan, depicting Adolf Hitler kneeling in prayer.

== See also ==
- Shock art
- Succès de scandale: Some scandals successfully boost the artist's career.
- Transgressive art
