= Ringer (song) =

Song by Godflesh

Promotional single by Godflesh

from the EP Decline & Fall
- Released: 21 May 2014
- Genre: Industrial metal
- Length: 6:23
- Label: Avalanche Recordings
- Songwriter: Justin Broadrick
- Producer: Justin Broadrick

Godflesh singles chronology
"F.O.D. (Fuck of Death)"	"Ringer"	"Post Self"

Audio sample
- file; help

"Ringer" is a song by English industrial metal band Godflesh. It was taken from their 2014 extended play Decline & Fall. The song was released ahead of the EP on 21 May 2014 through frontman Justin Broadrick's own label, Avalanche Recordings, as a digital download. "Ringer" was the first original material released by Godflesh since their dissolution in 2002, and it was praised by critics as an ideal return for the band.

== Background ==
In 2012, Godflesh entered the studio to record their seventh studio album, A World Lit Only by Fire. The studio (an at-home setup in Wales) saw Justin Broadrick and G. C. Green recording a number of songs, two of which were cut from the album and repurposed for an extended play titled Decline & Fall. On 21 May 2014, "Ringer", the EP's introductory track and Godflesh's first original material since the band dissolved in 2002, was released early for streaming. Decline & Fall was released shortly after that on 2 June 2014 with A World Lit Only by Fire following on 7 October 2014.

== Composition ==
Musically, "Ringer" is a slow, distorted, heavy song built around Broadrick's eight-string guitar, Green's overdriven bass and the characteristic programmed percussion that helped Godflesh define industrial metal. The song begins with a wash of distortion before descending into the extreme weight of the guitar, bass and repeatedly thumping drum machine double-kicks. Gregory Adams of Exclaim! described "Ringer's" main riff as a "punishing detuned groove" that the song locks into and that "batter[s] the brain"; Self-Titled magazine called the riff a "familiar blissful chug". The Fader's Colin Joyce wrote that the song starts with "a blown-out drum machine and warped, harrowing guitar work". Buried among the overwhelming, downtuned noise are Broadrick's half-sung, half-growled vocals, which were described as craggy, rhythmic, moaned, throaty and soured. The programmed drumming, a staple of Godflesh's early sound, was highlighted as chaotic and throbbing, with a sound that, as Adams describes, "burrows into your eardrums". Dan Reilly of Spin called the song "skull-crushing", and Maya Kalev of Resident Advisor described "Ringer" by writing, "It opens with a thin growl and explodes into a colossus of riffs, vocal moans and percussive pounding that seems to choke on itself before redoubling its strength and fading into an ominous stretch."

=== "Ringer" (Dub) ===
"Ringer" (Dub)
This clip highlights the sparseness of the dub mix.

A remixed version of "Ringer" was released on the Japanese edition of Decline & Fall, titled "Ringer" (Dub). As a dub mix, it is noticeably sparser than the original track, featuring spaces where the otherwise omnipresent guitar chugging falls away so the song can focus on percussion and bass. It is almost a minute longer than the base song.

== Critical reception ==
"Ringer" was met with very positive reviews. Invisible Oranges described the public and critical reaction to the song as full of relief, writing that it "sounded like Godflesh" and that "the purity from the innovators was appreciated". Several critics echoed this sentiment, noting that "Ringer" was instantly evocative of Godflesh's signature sound. Jeremy Ulrey of Metal Injection wrote that the song "has an absolutely savage central riff that almost seems written with sole purpose of teaching new school industrial dabblers like Batillus who really runs this shit." MetalSucks' Axl Rosenberg wrote, "the track fucking rules. I can't imagine anyone being disappointed by it".

== Track listing ==
No.	Title	Length
1.	"Ringer"	6:23
2.	"Ringer" (Dub)	7:09

== Personnel ==
Credits adapted from Decline & Fall liner notes

- Justin Broadrick – vocals, guitar, machines, record producer
- G. C. Green – bass guitar
