= Banquet of Chestnuts =

Purported 1501 bacchanal at the Vatican

The Banquet of Chestnuts (sometimes the Ballet of Chestnuts, the Festival of Chestnuts, or the Joust of Whores) was a supper purportedly held at the Papal Palace in Rome and hosted by former Cardinal Cesare Borgia, son of Pope Alexander VI, on 31 October 1501.

== Burchard's account ==
An account of the banquet appears in the Liber Notarum of Johann Burchard, a Protonotary Apostolic and Master of Ceremonies. This diary, a primary source on the life of Alexander VI, was preserved in the Vatican Secret Archive; it became available to researchers in the mid-19th century when Pope Leo XIII opened the archive, although Leo expressed specific reluctance to allow general access to a document which might harm the reputation of Alexander VI.

According to Burchard, the banquet was given in Cesare Borgia's apartments in the Palazzo Apostolico. Fifty prostitutes or courtesans were in attendance for the entertainment of the banquet guests. Burchard describes the scene as follows:

On the evening of the last day of October, 1501, Cesare Borgia arranged a banquet in his chambers in the Vatican with "fifty honest prostitutes", called courtesans, who danced after dinner with the attendants and others who were present, at first in their garments, then naked. After dinner the candelabra with the burning candles were taken from the tables and placed on the floor, and chestnuts were strewn around, which the naked courtesans picked up, creeping on hands and knees between the chandeliers, while the Pope, Cesare, and his sister Lucrezia looked on. Finally, prizes were announced for those who could perform the act most often with the courtesans, such as tunics of silk, shoes, barrets, and other things.

== Historicity ==
Both contemporary and modern authors have questioned the accuracy of Burchard's account. Two independent contemporary sources confirm that a social event occurred on the date given by Burchard, but give fewer details of the festivities.

The Belgian Vatican researcher Peter de Roo, in his five-volume history of Alexander VI, speculates that the passage may be a later interpolation in Burchard's memoirs, arguing that the Pope could not be capable of such "truly bestial" behavior. Other historians, however, have criticized De Roo's biography, describing it as "a vast apologetic work in which much useful material is often almost undetectable under the coat of white-wash" and as uncritically accepting all praise and rejecting all criticism of Alexander VI.

Alexander Lee notes that "The so-called 'Banquet of the Chestnuts'… is, for example, attested only in Burchard's memoirs, and not only was intrinsically implausible, but also was dismissed as such by many contemporaries." Henry A. Brann, a Catholic priest and historian, argues that "courtesans" is an improper translation of a word better understood as "courtiers", and that references to "nudity" merely describe "a throwing off of the outer robes."

Defending the historicity of the account, Giles Milton argues that the Liber Notarum is "a deeply serious work", that Burchard is generally a reliable source not prone to exaggerations, and that the events described are not out of character for Alexander VI, known for fathering the most illegitimate children of any pope.

== In popular culture ==
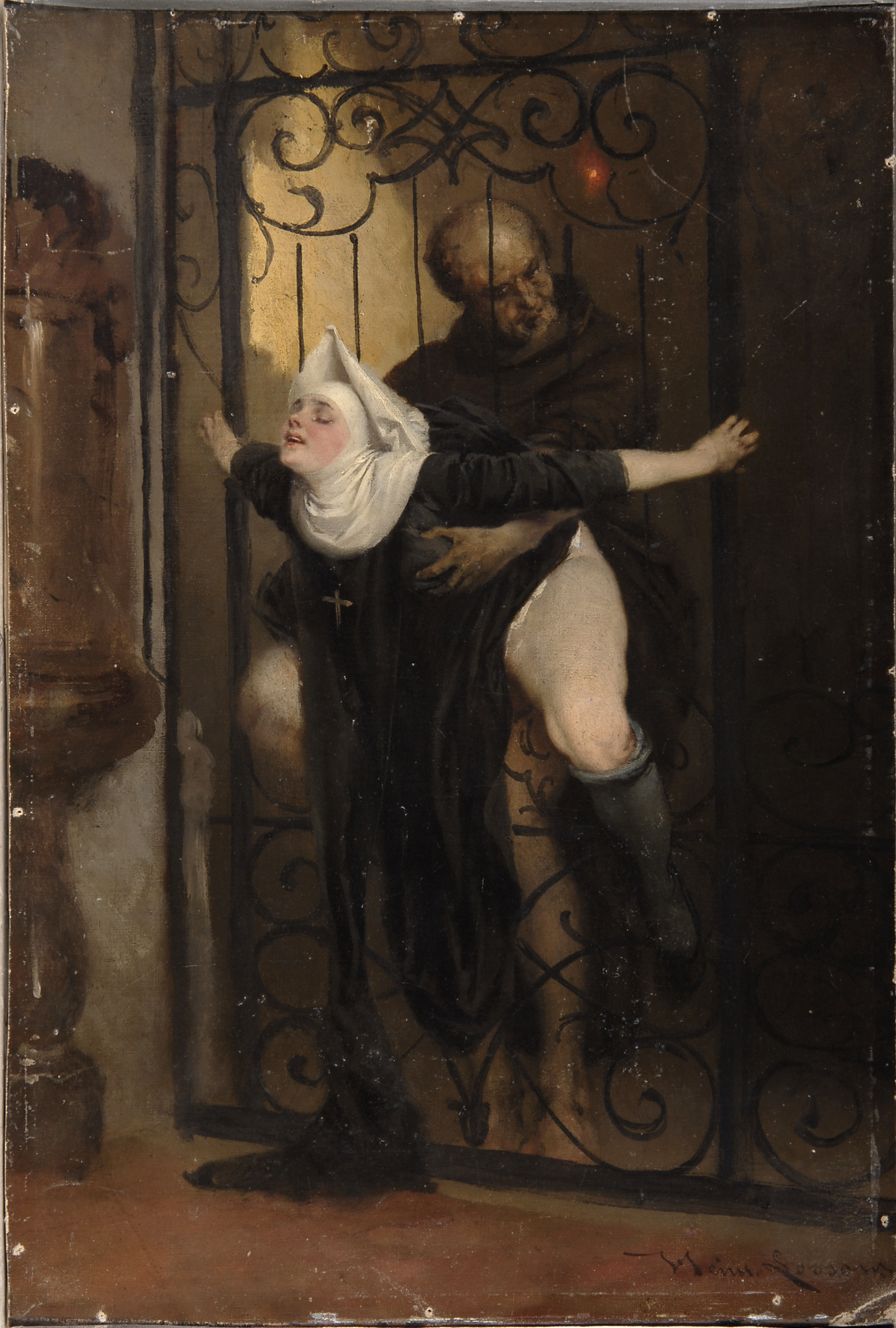
The Sin (1880) by Heinrich Lossow

The American author William Manchester's 1992 book A World Lit Only by Fire, which embellishes the original account, has been dismissed or ignored by professional historians because of its numerous factual errors and its dependence on interpretations that have not been accepted by experts since the 1930s. In a review for Speculum, the journal of the Medieval Academy of America, Jeremy duQuesnay Adams remarked that Manchester's work contained "some of the most gratuitous errors of fact and eccentricities of judgment this reviewer has read (or heard) in quite some time."

The banquet is depicted in episode 4 of season 3 of the Showtime TV series The Borgias. In the show, the Banquet is shown to be a trap to blackmail otherwise disloyal members of the College of Cardinals, and is officiated by Giulia Farnese, and witnessed by Burchard who chronicles the debaucheries of the Cardinals while hidden behind a screen. None of the Borgia family are seen to be present, and loyal Cardinals such as Cardinal Farnese are warned not to accept the invitation. In the series, the event takes place in c. 1499.

The painting The Sin (1880) by Heinrich Lossow, depicting a nun having sex with a monk, is believed to be inspired by the Banquet of Chestnuts.

== See also ==
- List of dining events
- List of sexually active popes
- House of Borgia
- Route of the Borgias

== Bibliography ==
- John (Johann) Burchard, Pope Alexander VI and his Court: extracts from the Latin diary of the Papal Master of Ceremonies, 1484–1506; ed. F. L. Glaser, New York, 1921
- Barbara W. Tuchman, The March of Folly. New York: Knopf, 1984; p. 106 ISBN 0-394-52777-1; another issue has ISBN 0-349-13365-4
- Burgo Partridge, A History of Orgies, Bonanza Books, 1960, p. 106
