= A Burial at Ornans =

Painting by Gustave Courbet, 1850–1851

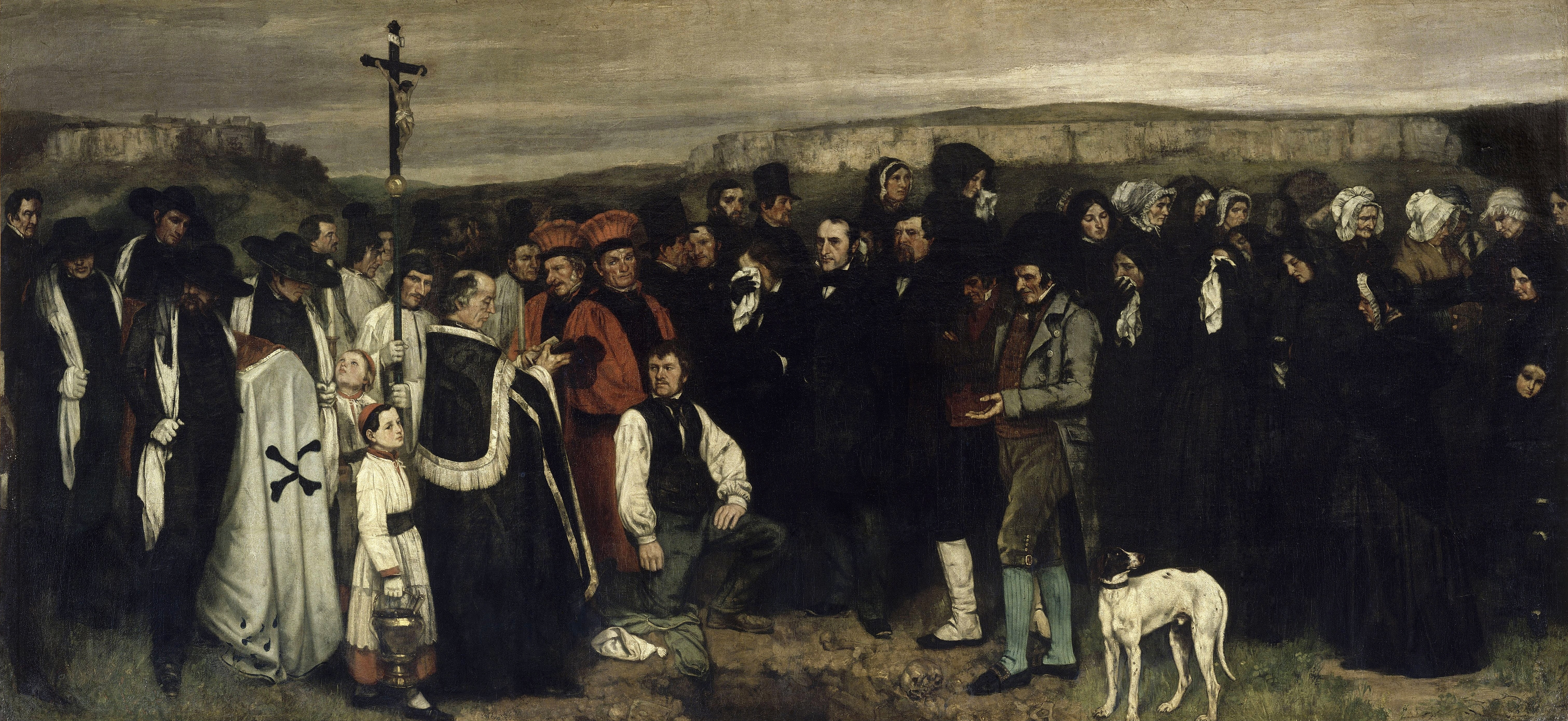
- Artist: Gustave Courbet
- Year: 1849–50
- Medium: Oil on canvas
- Dimensions: 315 cm × 660 cm (124 in × 260 in)
- Location: Musée d'Orsay, Paris

A Burial at Ornans (French: Un enterrement à Ornans, also known as A Funeral at Ornans) is a painting of 1849–50 by Gustave Courbet. It is widely regarded as a major turning point in 19th-century French art. The painting records a funeral in Courbet's birthplace, the small town of Ornans. It treats an ordinary, provincial funeral with frank realism, and on the grand scale traditionally reserved for the heroic or religious scenes of history painting. Its exhibition at the Paris Salon of 1850 created an "explosive reaction" and brought Courbet instant fame. It is currently displayed at the Musée d'Orsay in Paris, France. It underwent conservation treatment led by Cinzia Pasquali in 2026.

== Background ==
=== Creation ===
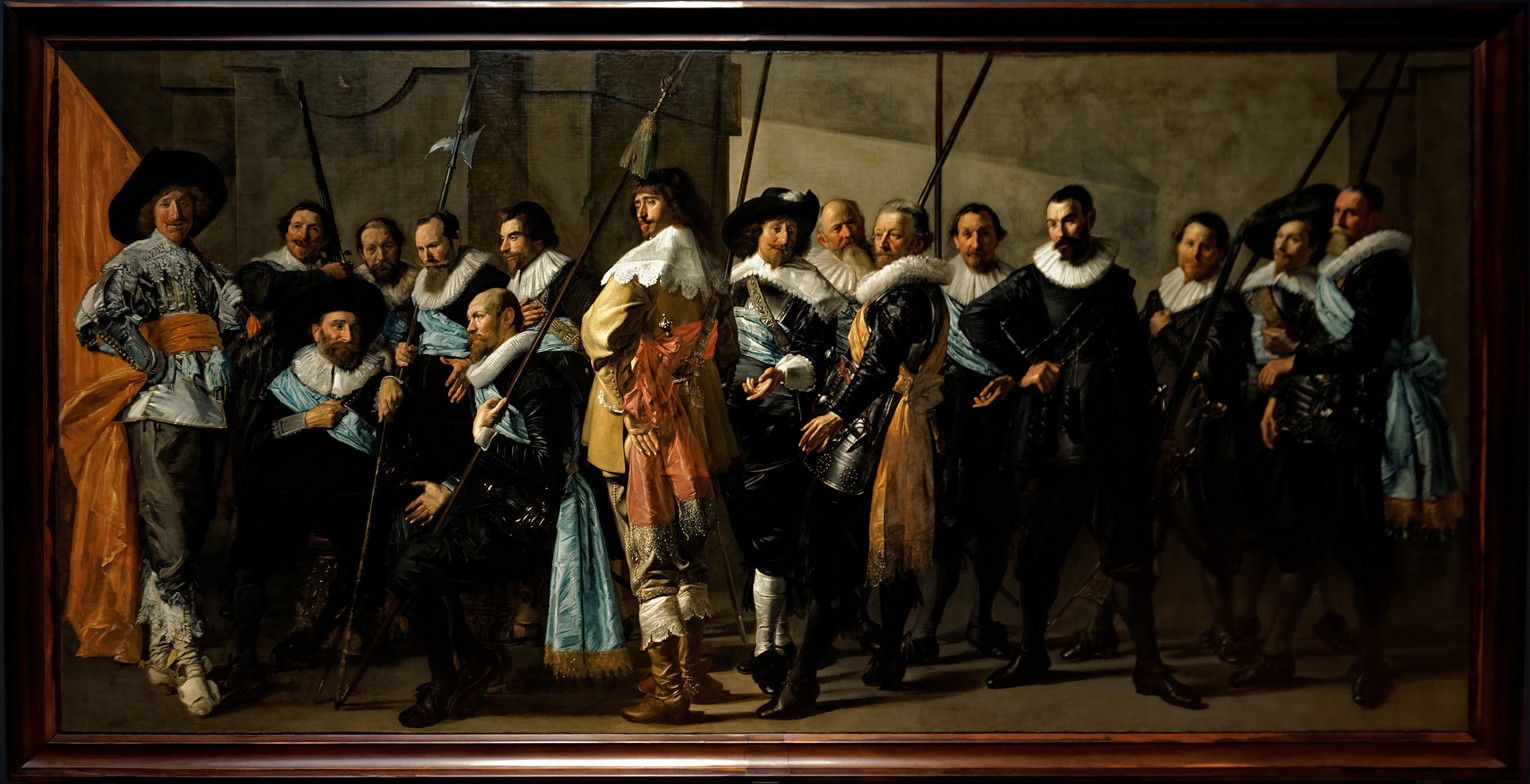
Courbet was possibly influenced by The Meagre Company after a trip to Amsterdam

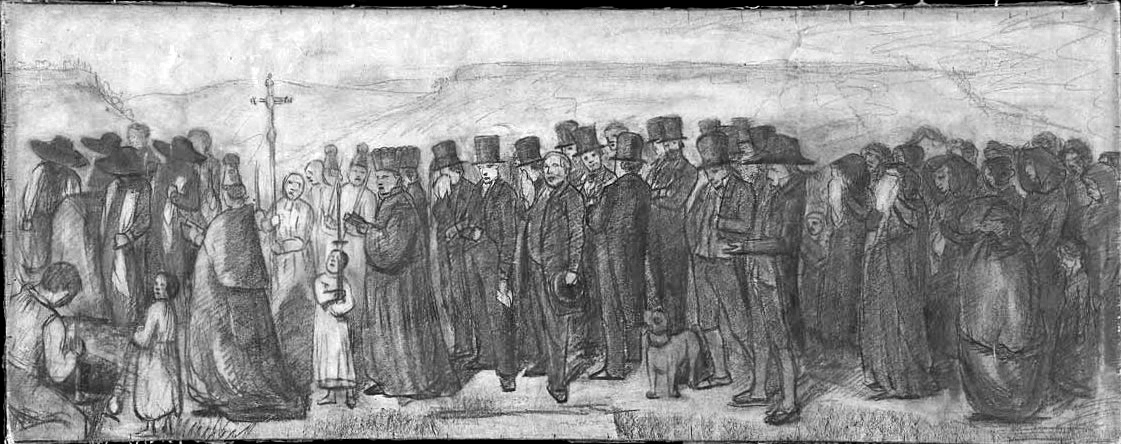
Original sketch of A Burial at Ornans by Courbet from 1849

Courbet likely drew inspiration from two different types of sources. One is seventeenth-century Dutch group portraits, such as Banquet of Captain Bicker (1648), Company of Captain Allaert Cloek (1632), or Meagre Company (1637). The other is woodcuts from the 1830s and 40s such as Souvenir Mortuaire (1830), featuring an elevated cross and a grave digger on the left, and Degrés des Âges (1830), depicting individuals in a semicircle around a scene of death. While these all likely had an impact on the creation of the painting, Courbet scholar Gerstle Mack claims that the original inspiration for the painting most likely came from the funeral of Oudot, Courbet's grandfather, who had died a year before he created the painting. According to another theory, the painting is based on a funeral for a member of the Proudhon family; Courbet was close with Pierre-Joseph Proudhon, and some of the figures in Burial are said to resemble members of the family. Courbet made a sketch prior to the final work, and the people of Ornans posed as models.

=== Composition ===
At the bottom center of the painting, there is an open grave with a skull and bones along its edge. Behind the grave stands a group of attendees, arranged loosely in three groups: church members, veterans with a dog, and other officials and mourners. The members of the church include a priest, a cross bearer, choir boys, and beadles. The crucifix held by the cross bearer looms above the figures in the painting. Courbet described the two figures standing with the white dog as "two old veterans of the Revolution of '93" who wear "the clothes of their time." The two figures have since been identified as Secrétan and Cardet, both friends of Courbet's grandfather. The figure among the crowd in the back on the far left of the painting has also been identified as Oudot, Courbet's grandfather.

The painting places the figures in a linear structure, arranging them alongside of each other. For this reason, some have described it as an additive mode of composition that focuses on the juxtaposition of figures. Others push back on this notion, claiming that the proximity of the figures along with their similar colors of costume unify them as though they are physically merged, not allowing the viewer's attention to rest on one person at a time. Each figure also appears to receive relatively equal emphasis, making the composition of the painting anti-hierarchical. Additionally, the linear nature of the painting suggests a lateral movement, which is reinforced by the final painting and the original sketch having unusual proportions, being much wider than tall.

== Analysis ==
=== Interpretations ===
By 1848, Courbet showed an interest in representing common people in a realistic manner. He expressed in letters his belief that his art was democratic. By depicting the townspeople of Ornans at a grand scale that was previously reserved for history paintings, Courbet declared the importance of ordinary, rural people to the Parisian public at the Salon. The provocative presentation of an ordinary subject in a large format has led many commentators to see the work as a political statement. This interpretation was especially common among Courbet's contemporaries who praised it for its realism, as well as for the democratic and socialist ideals it represented.

The composition of the painting has provided further support for this political interpretation. The horizontal format, with all figures represented on roughly the same level, delivered a seemingly egalitarian and socialist message.

Art historian T.J. Clark, however, has argued that the sociopolitical message of the painting is complex. Clark emphasizes the painting's stillness, ambiguity, and irony. At the time of the painting's creation, there was tension between peasants and the bourgeoisie, and though this painting may depict the rural bourgeoisie, it does not, according to Clark, take a stance on them. Clark instead claims that the painting simply represents rural French life, its structure, and permanence. Clark relates this message to the personal position of Courbet, whose family was not fully bourgeois, but was wealthy enough to own two homes. Rather than see the painting in terms of left and right politics, Clark interprets it as being about the subject of class.

Other commentators have rejected both politics and class as key to the painting's meaning. Some have simply interpreted it as Courbet's effort to depict an event that took place in his hometown. The art critic Champfleury wrote at the time, "there is not a trace of socialism in A Burial at Ornans ... Fortunately, M. Courbet has not tried to prove anything by his Burial. It represents death of a citizen who is escorted to his last resting place by other citizens ... It has pleased the painter to show us the domestic life of a small town ... As to the alleged ugliness of the townspeople, there is nothing exaggerated about it."

==== Skull ====
The skull and bones sit at the bottom of the painting between the veterans and the clergymen. Its placement between groups of two opposing ideologies is thought to potentially comment on "human aspirations and failures," showing the pointlessness of ideological contests, while also serving to emotionally move viewers. This interpretation sees the skull as an expression of Courbet's discontent with both traditional and revolutionary values. The skull is placed on the side of the grave closer to the veterans, which has sometimes been seen as a comment on revolutionaries. In traditional paintings of crucifixions, the side that the skull is placed on symbolizes those who "thrive on death," making the skull a potential comment on the violence of revolution.

==== Crucifix ====
The prominent position of the crucifix above all other figures is thought to symbolize the importance of Catholicism and traditional social values among the rural French population. At the same time, the inattentiveness of the church figures may serve as a witty commentary on the emptiness of the ritual they perform. Clark observes that there are all the elements of the burial ritual without their unison. Those attending the service are portrayed as indifferent to the presence of religion within the service, which may be interpreted as Courbet separating the two. Contemporary critics such as Proudhon also noticed this. He saw spirituality as being important in the death of a human, and he took the impious atmosphere of the scene to be a commentary on France losing its faith. Others, such as Hélène Toussaint, would later argue that the crucifix itself is a representation of hope that, after the 1848 Revolution, Christianity could be the basis for a rebuilding of French unity. This interpretation has often been disregarded due to the disconnect between those in the painting and the crucifix.

==== Veteran ====
The two veterans of the Revolution of '93 are represented in the painting in a light that was common at the time. They are worn down and old, standing proudly next to the grave, skull, and bones. Historian James C. McCarthy argues that their appearance likely represents both the contempt and compassion that Courbet felt towards them. McCarthy claims that the figures stood as a representation of "old-fashioned intransigence, a lack of contact with the latest revolutionary ideals, and a sense of frustration mingled with a certain bitterness." Additionally, Courbet may have represented them in this way due to his belief in non-violence. He described himself as a pacifist both early in life and later in his autobiography. He also expressed his disdain for violence after witnessing some of the horrors of the 1848 Revolution.

=== Controversies ===
Much of the controversy surrounding A Burial at Ornans centered on its monumental size. Its large scale had previously been reserved for history paintings, which academic doctrine held to be the highest genre. By depicting rural life at such a grand scale, Courbet scandalized audiences. In addition to the size, critics were displeased by the ugliness of the painting. They saw the composition as being crowded, disorganized, and without a clear focal point.

The work was also criticized for its impious presentation of death. At the time, scenes of death and funerals often delivered a religious message. This was true of the woodcuts that influenced Courbet. For example, Degrés des Âges presents a scene of heaven and hell underneath an aging couple. Many paintings of the subject also represent funeral attendees as mourning or pious, with the clergy shown as devoted. Both of these elements are absent in Burial. Some viewers may have seen this fact as a rightful criticism of contemporary funeral rituals. In 1849, there was a cholera outbreak, during which the funeral industry was faulted for price gouging. Additionally, questions had grown about the presence of the church and its efficacy. Some commentators also saw the painting as a scandalous celebration of France's declining religious faith.

While the painting was criticized for its ugliness and impiety, it was also praised for its realism and unprecedented representation of rural France.

=== Impact ===
Courbet is widely regarded as a leader of French Realism. Burial, as one of Courbet's most controversial works, helped bring Realism to the attention of the public. Additionally, some historians, such as Mack, believe that Courbet had an influence on the Impressionist movement. According to Mack, Courbet's works, and Burial in particular, allowed artists to explore new ways of painting and new subject matter.

== See also ==
- Artistic scandal
