= The Gleaners =

Painting by Jean-François Millet

- Des glaneuses (French)
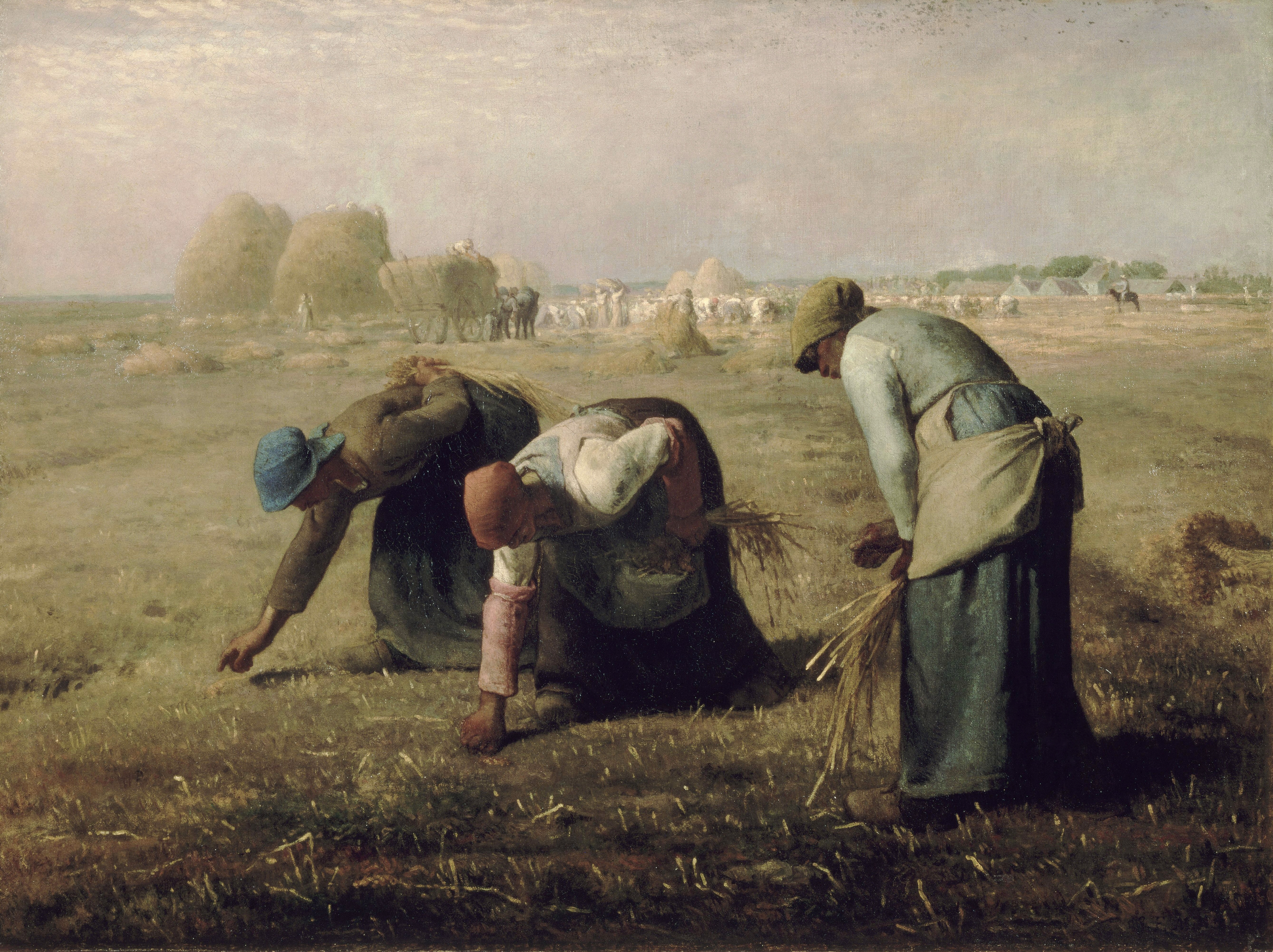
- Artist: Jean-François Millet
- Year: 1857
- Medium: Oil on canvas
- Dimensions: 83.8 cm × 111.8 cm (33 in × 44 in)
- Location: Musée d'Orsay, Paris

The Gleaners (Des glaneuses) is an oil painting by Jean-François Millet completed in 1857. It is held in the Musée d'Orsay, in Paris.

It depicts three peasant women gleaning a field of stray stalks of wheat after the harvest. The painting is famous for featuring in a sympathetic way what were then the lowest ranks of rural society; it was received poorly by the French upper classes.

== History ==
Millet's The Gleaners was preceded by a vertical painting of the image in 1854 and an etching in 1855. Millet unveiled The Gleaners at the Salon of 1857. It immediately drew negative criticism from the middle and upper classes, who viewed the topic with suspicion: one art critic, speaking for other Parisians, perceived in it an alarming intimation of "the scaffolds of 1793."

《Gleaners, Summer》, 1853

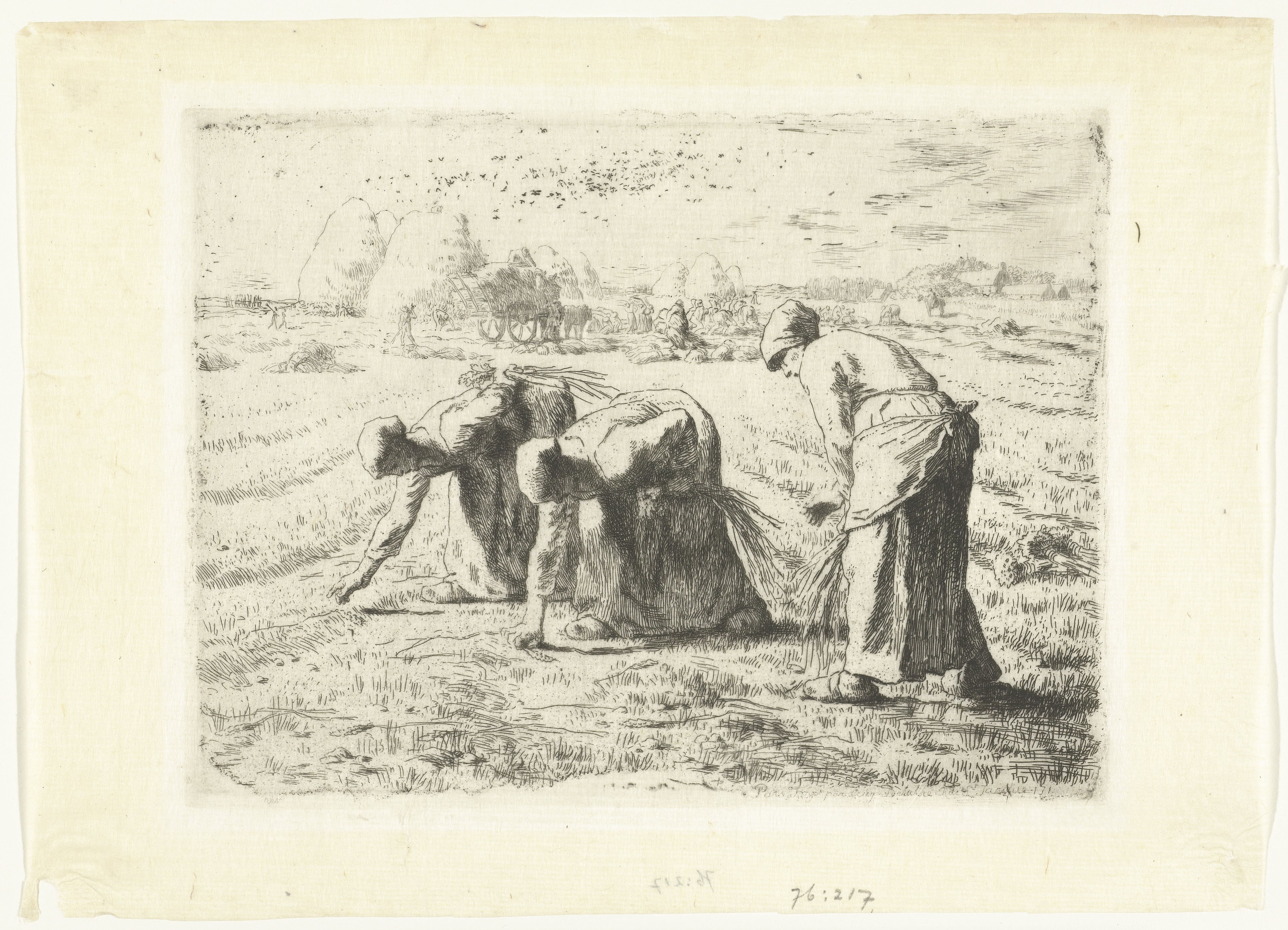
Etching of The Gleaners, 1855

Having recently come out of the French Revolution of 1848, these prosperous classes saw the painting as glorifying the lower-class worker. To them, it was a reminder that French society was built upon the labor of the working masses, and landowners linked this working class with the growing movement of socialism. The depiction of the working class in The Gleaners made the upper classes feel uneasy about their status. The masses of workers greatly outnumbered the members of the upper class. This disparity in numbers meant that if the lower class were to revolt, the upper class would be overturned.

Millet's The Gleaners was also not perceived well due to its large size, 33 inches by 44 inches, or 84 by 112 centimetres. This was large for a painting depicting labor. Normally this size of a canvas was reserved for religious or mythological style paintings. The painting illustrated a realistic view of poverty and the working class. One critic commented that "his three gleaners have gigantic pretensions, they pose as the Three Fates of Poverty...their ugliness and their grossness unrelieved."

While the act of gleaning was not a new topic—representations of Ruth had existed in art—this new work was a statement on rural poverty and not biblical piety: there is no touch of the biblical sense of community and compassion in the contrasting embodiments of grinding poverty in the foreground and the rich harvest in the sunlit distance beyond. The implicit irony was unsettling.

After the Salon, Millet, short on money, sold his piece for 3,000 francs—below his asking price of 4,000—after haggling with an Englishman named Binder who would not budge for his meagre counter-offer; Millet tried to keep the miserable price a secret.

While The Gleaners garnered little but notoriety during his life, after his death in 1875, public appreciation of his work steadily broadened. In 1889, the painting, then owned by banker Ferdinand Bischoffsheim, sold for 300,000 francs at auction. The buyer remained anonymous, but rumours were that the painting was coveted by an American collector. It was announced less than a week later that Champagne maker Jeanne-Alexandrine Louise Pommery had acquired the piece, which silenced gossip on her supposed financial issues after leaving her grapes on the vines weeks longer than her competitors.

At Madame Pommery's death in 1891, and following the conditions of her will, the painting was donated to the Louvre. It now resides in the Musée d'Orsay in Paris.

What does The Gleaners show? [The women] embody an animal force deeply absorbed by a painstaking task. The contrast between wealth and poverty, power and helplessness, male and female spheres is forcefully rendered.

— Liana Vardi

== Legacy ==
The Gleaners is one of Millet's best-known works. Its imagery of bending peasant women gleaning was paraphrased frequently in works by younger artists such as Pissarro, Renoir, Seurat, and van Gogh. Art historian Robert Rosenblum says Millet's painting introduced "imposing new presences in the repertory of mid-century art, with endless progeny in city and country. Daumier's and Degas's laundresses, and even more so Caillebotte's floor-scrapers, are almost unthinkable without Millet's epic hymn to labor."

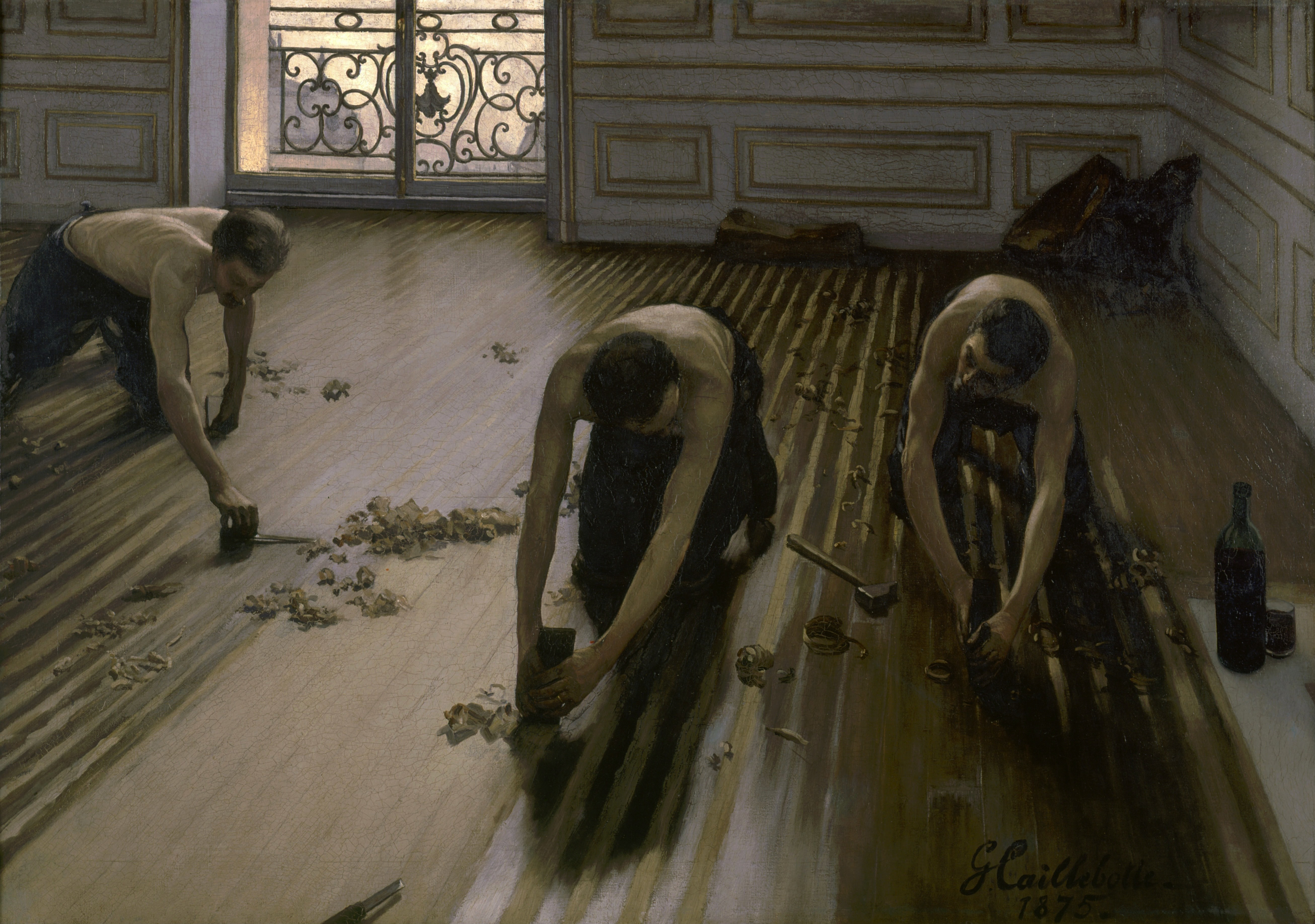
Gustave Caillebotte, The Floor Planers, 1875

The Gleaners provides evidence of Millet's role as a contemporary social critic. His brutal depiction of three female gleaners segregated from the laborers and the abundant crop in the distance demonstrates his attention to, if not necessarily sympathy for, the plight of the poorest members of the community around Barbizon and its larger neighbor, Chailly, as the area experienced the growing pains of French modernization. Only about thirty-five miles from the French capital (whose population doubled between 1831 and 1851), the rich, broad plain bordering the forest of Fontainebleau was among the earliest with a rail link to Paris, readily lending itself to feeding the burgeoning city.

Studies tracing the transformation of rural France in the nineteenth century note that little change in peasant life occurred beyond northern France and the Paris basin until the last quarter of the century. Millet's representation of class strife on a large-scale farm was thus uniquely modern in the 1850s.

The painting inspired and is discussed in the 2000 film by Agnès Varda, The Gleaners and I. The film itself inspired a 2019 studio album by American jazz bassist Larry Grenadier. The Gleaners was included in the Nintendo video game series Animal Crossing as a piece of art that can be donated to the museum.

== See also ==
- Scandals in art
- Droit de suite
- Social realism

== Bibliography ==
- Cole, Bruce and Adelheid Gealt. Art of the Western World. Simon & Schuster, 1991
- Fratello, Bradley (December 2003). "France embraces Millet: the intertwined fates of The Gleaners and The Angelus". The Art Bulletin 85 (4): 685–701. doi:10.2307/3177365.
- Kimmelman, Michael (August 27, 1999), "Art Review; Plucking Warmth From Millet's Light", The New York Times, retrieved 2008-01-10
- Kleiner, Fred; Christian J. Mamiya (2005). Gardner's Art Through the Ages (12 ed.). California: Wadsworth/Thompson Learning. p. 857. ISBN 0-534-64091-5.
- "Story behind the picture – The Gleaners". University of St. Andrews. Retrieved 2008-01-10.
- Moreau-Nélaton, Étienne. Millet racconté par lui-même. Paris, 1921
- Pollock, Griselda. Millet. London: Oresko, 1977
- Rosenblum, Robert (1989). Paintings in the Musée d'Orsay. New York: Stewart, Tabori & Chang. ISBN 1-55670-099-7
- Vardi, Liana (December 1993). "Construing the Harvest: Gleaners, Farmers, and Officials in Early Modern France". The American Historical Review 98 (5): 1424–1447. doi:10.2307/2167061.
