= The Sin (Lossow) =

1880 painting by Heinrich Lossow

- Die Versündigung (German)
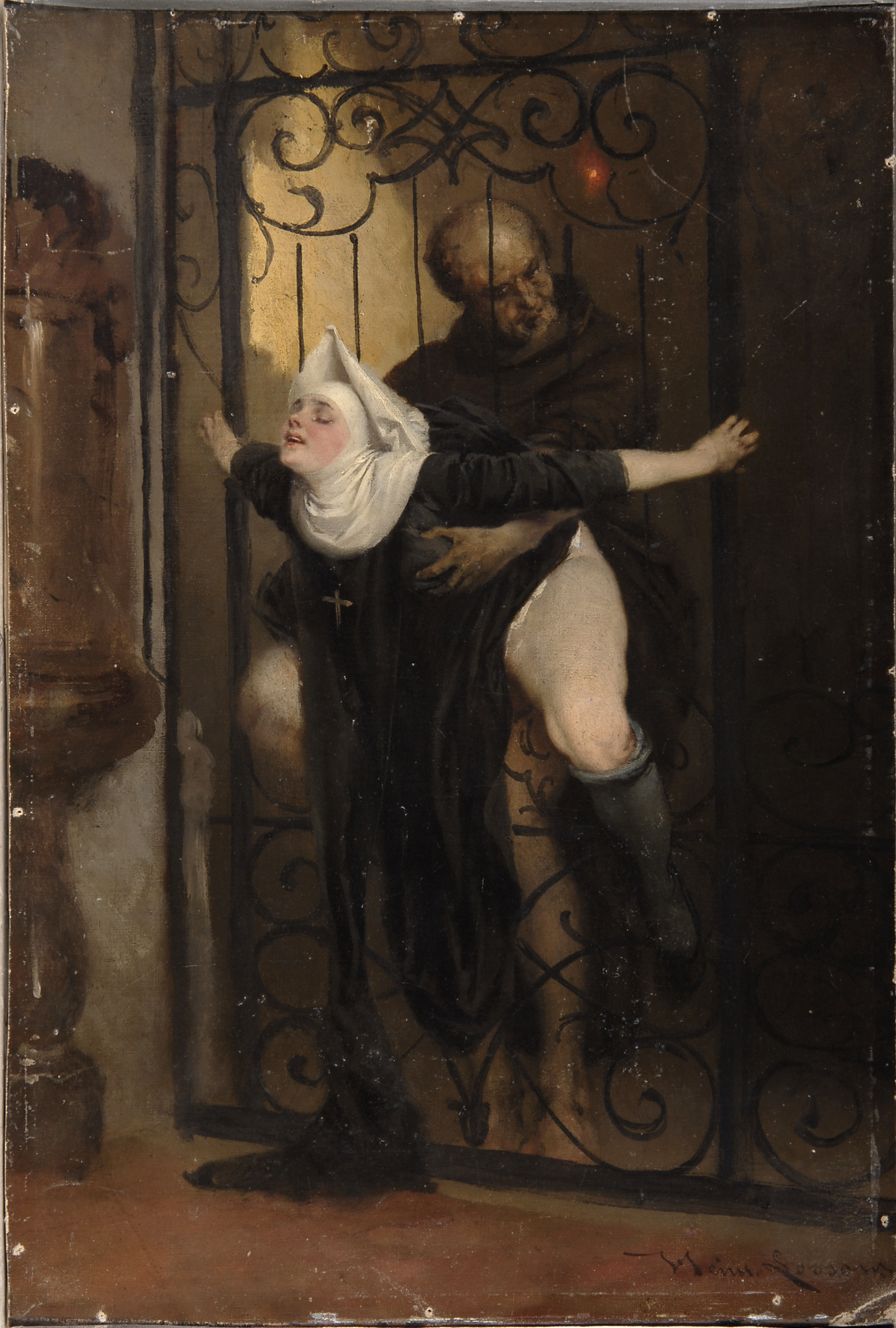
- Artist: Heinrich Lossow
- Year: 1880
- Medium: Oil on canvas
- Dimensions: 55 cm × 37 cm (21.6 in × 14.5 in)

The Sin (German: Die Versündigung) is an 1880 oil on canvas erotic art painting by the German artist Heinrich Lossow (1843–1897). The painting depicts a Catholic monk enjoying consensual copulation with a Catholic nun through an iron gate that is achieved by using an athletic sexual position; the painting uses the chiaroscuro technique to contrast its two subjects.

While little is known of Lossow's motivation, the painting is believed to be thematically linked to the Banquet of Chestnuts, an event purported to have taken place in 1501 in Rome where Cesare Borgia, an Italian nobleman and former Cardinal, hired courtesans to attend a feast with his father, Pope Alexander VI. The monk in the painting is sometimes suspected to be Cesare himself. The painting caused significant controversy and outrage in Germany due to its explicit nature and anti-clerical content, and Lossow was formally condemned by the Catholic Church. The location of the painting remains unknown, and it is believed to be in private ownership.

== See also ==
- A Monk With a Beguine, 1591 erotic painting
- Kneeling Nun, 1731 erotic painting
- Anti-clerical art
- Erotic art
- Scandals in art
