= Decline & Fall (EP) =

EP by Godflesh
- Released: 2 June 2014
- Recorded: 2013–2014
- Genre: Industrial metal; post-punk
- Length: 20:34
- Label: Avalanche
- Producer: Justin Broadrick

Godflesh chronology
Streetcleaner: Live at Roadburn 2011 (2013)	Decline & Fall (2014)	A World Lit Only by Fire (2014)

Singles from Decline & Fall
- 1. "Ringer" Released: 21 May 2014

Decline & Fall is the sixth EP by English industrial metal band Godflesh. It was released on 2 June 2014 through frontman Justin Broadrick's own record label, Avalanche Recordings. The EP is the second release by Godflesh since Hymns (2001), following the 2013 single "F.O.D. (Fuck of Death)". It precedes the group's seventh studio album, A World Lit Only by Fire (2014), and the two were recorded in the same sessions.

The track "Ringer" was released for streaming in May 2014 on the band's SoundCloud account.

== Background and composition ==
When mixing began for Godflesh's return studio album, A World Lit Only by Fire, Broadrick found that there was more material than he wanted to include on a single release. To keep the album under an hour, he cut the more "colorful" and "dynamic" outlying tracks and combined them to create Decline & Fall. In a 2014 interview with the French publication La Grosse Radio, Broadrick spoke about the value of the EP format, explaining that it allows for more experimentation because the general public doesn't consider it as important as a studio album release.

Decline & Fall and the following album feature extensive use of an eight-string guitar. The guitar, a signature model, was provided to Broadrick by Blakhart. On the use of this instrument, Broadrick stated:

I have been playing an eight-string guitar for a few years now, first release that was eight-string was the Jesu Christmas EP in 2010. All new Godflesh, both the EP and the new LP, were written and recorded with an eight-string, mainly due to the ability to tune even lower coupled with the capability to achieve more complex dissonant chords and riffs. On the latest Jesu LP Everyday I Get Closer to the Light from Which I Came, "The Great Leveller" is with eight-string guitar.

"Decline & Fall"
The EP's title track showcases its extreme weight, distortion and repetition.

Musically, Decline & Fall is a heavy industrial metal release with extremely distorted, low and repetitive guitar work layered over similarly distorted bass from B. C. Green and Godflesh's signature drum machine beats. The EP marked a return to the group's mechanical percussion after 2001's Hymns, which featured live drumming by Ted Parsons. Decline & Fall is intentionally dissonant and rough; Zoe Camp of Pitchfork wrote that the production of the EP could be heard as a response to the sanitation of industrial music, saying that "Godflesh remain fiercely loyal to lo-fi, treating songs as caustic exercises in overstimulation."

== Critical reception ==
Professional ratings
Review scores
Source	Rating
Pitchfork	7.9/10
Resident Advisor	4/5 stars
The Wire	Positive

Decline and Fall was met with positive reviews. Zoe Camp of Pitchfork gave the EP a positive review, writing, "Avant and yet strangely accessible, industrially-minded but all-embracing, Decline & Fall confirms that a decade-plus-long absence has dulled neither Godflesh’s industrial spirit, nor their devotion to experimentation." Gregory Heany of AllMusic described the EP as "sludgy, grime-covered industrial metal that feels like a promising preview for their first post-breakup full-length, A World Lit Only by Fire." Maya Kalev of Resident Advisor wrote, "Even when it seems like Godflesh are re-treading old ground, the effect is never less than thrilling."

Decline & Fall drew favorable comparisons to early Godflesh releases, like their 1988 self-titled EP and their debut album, Streetcleaner (1989).

== Track listing ==
All songs written by Justin Broadrick and G.C. Green.

No.	Title	Length
1.	"Ringer"	6:23
2.	"Dogbite"	3:52
3.	"Playing with Fire"	6:01
4.	"Decline & Fall"	4:17
Total length:		20:34

Bandcamp and Japanese bonus tracks
No.	Title	Length
5.	"Ringer" (Dub)	7:09
6.	"Playing with Fire" (Dub)	6:08
Total length:		33:52

== Personnel ==
- Justin Broadrick – vocals, eight-string guitar, production
- B. C. Green – bass
- Machines – drums, rhythm
