= A World Lit Only by Fire =

Book by William Manchester

A World Lit only By Fire
- Author: William Manchester
- Language: English
- Subject: History 1
- Publisher: Little, Brown and Company; A Back Bay Book (paperback)
- Publication date: 1992; 1993 Paperback
- Publication place: United States
- Media type: Print (Hardback, Paperback)
- Pages: 322 (Paperback)
- ISBN: 0-316-54531-7 (1st edition)=ISBN 0-316-54556-2 (pb)
- OCLC: 243729651
- Dewey Decimal: 940.2/1 20
- LC Class: CB369 .M36 1992

A World Lit Only by Fire: The Medieval Mind and the Renaissance: Portrait of an Age is an informal history of the European Middle Ages by American historian William Manchester. Published in 1992, the book is divided into three sections: "The Medieval Mind", "The Shattering", and "One Man Alone". In the book, Manchester posits, as the title suggests, that the Middle Ages were ten centuries of technological stagnation, short-sightedness, bloodshed, feudalism, and an oppressive Catholic Church wedged between the golden ages of the Roman Empire and the Renaissance.

== Contents ==
In the book's "Author's Note", Manchester says, "It is, after all, a slight work, with no scholarly pretensions. All the sources are secondary, and few are new; I have not mastered recent scholarship on the early sixteenth century."

"The Medieval Mind" extensively covers notable occurrences centered in approximately the year 500, including a description of the fall of the Roman Empire. The book further delineates the Dark Ages that immediately followed the collapse of the Roman Empire, including details regarding a number of adverse events that were characteristic of what Manchester regards as a "stark" era. It includes commentary on St. Augustine and the effects he had on medieval civilization. It talks about the overall ignorance of the masses during this time period.

The second section of the book, "The Shattering", is the book's longest section, expanding upon a number of events that Manchester regards as embodying the end of the Middle Ages as well as the early period of the Renaissance. It relates extensive anecdotes regarding a pope from the formidable medieval Borgia family, Pope Alexander VI, focusing on his "wild" celebrations and extensive nepotism, contrasted with a narrative centered around Martin Luther and the Protestant Reformation. Continuing with his focus in regard to spirituality, Manchester writes on the rise of humanism in the early Renaissance days and its celebration of secularism over piety. The section further covers humanist scholars, and concentrates upon the humanist tendencies of Renaissance leaders such as Michelangelo and Leonardo da Vinci. The European nobility of the era are also touched upon in chapters elaborately describing the life and decisions made by England's King Henry VIII. Henry's wives and eventual separation from the Church despite his being once an "ardent Catholic" are treated extensively.

The final section of the work, "One Man Alone", is a description of the voyage of the Portuguese explorer Ferdinand Magellan, who circumnavigated the globe. The section expands upon the life and personality of Magellan and his eventual death in the Philippines in an attempt to convert the natives to Catholicism there. Manchester's argument is ultimately that Magellan's voyage was concurrent with and, on several levels, symptomatic of changing ways in which Renaissance people thought.

== Reception ==
A World Lit Only by Fire became a New York Times bestseller and was praised for its lively storytelling in some journalistic reviews. Ron Grossman of the Chicago Tribune, for instance, wrote that "by taking readers along on Magellan's voyage, Manchester provides them with easy access to a fascinating age when our modern mentality was just being born."

Some professional historians, however, have dismissed or ignored the book because of accusations regarding numerous factual errors and its dependence on interpretations that largely fell out of favor by the 1930s. In a review for Speculum, the journal of the Medieval Academy of America, Jeremy duQuesnay Adams remarked that Manchester's work contained "some of the most gratuitous errors of fact and eccentricities of judgment this reviewer has read (or heard) in quite some time." In particular, Adams pointed out that Manchester's claims about diet, clothing, and medieval people's views of time and their sense of themselves were guilty of overstatement, overgeneralisation, and often ran counter to more recent, highly particularized and detailed scholarship.

Manchester’s views on the transition from medieval to modern civilization, though they were popular in the 19th and early 20th century (and still are current in some segments of contemporary culture), have long been rejected by professional scholars in the relevant fields. Despite this, the book has often taught at the beginning of College Board's AP European History class.

In 2014, the English industrial metal band Godflesh released an album named after Manchester's book.

In 2016, the book was chosen by Tom Hanks as the book he would take with him when castaway on BBC Radio 4's Desert Island Discs.

== See also ==
- The Dark Ages, a term for the Early Middle Ages in historiography
