= Heinrich Lossow =

German painter (1843–1897)

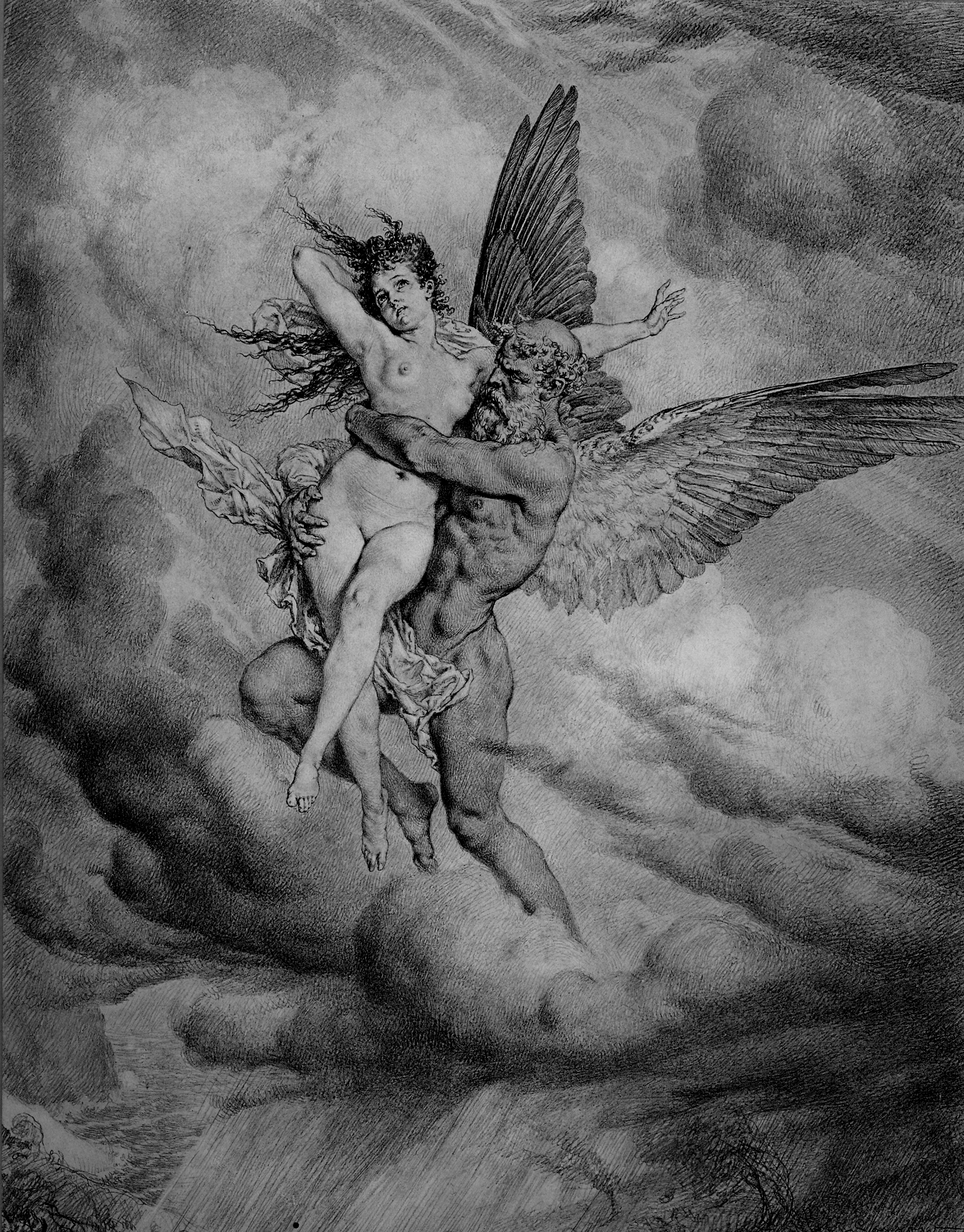
Boreas and Orithya (1880)

Heinrich Lossow (10 March 1843 – 19 May 1897) was a German genre painter and illustrator. He was a prolific pornographer in his spare time.

== Biography ==
Lossow was born on 10 March 1843, in Munich under the Kingdom of Bavaria. Lossow's father was Arnold Hermann Lossow, a Bremen sculptor. His father moved to Munich in 1820 to study under Ernst Mayer. In Munich, Arnold Hermann Lossow married and had three children: Carl Lossow in 1835, Friedrich Lossow in 1837, and Heinrich Lossow in 1843. The three boys had an affinity for art; Carl became a historical painter, while Friedrich became a wildlife painter. Heinrich would outlive both of his siblings.

He first trained under his father but would go on to study under Karl Theodor von Piloty at the Munich Academy of Fine Arts. He then traveled through France and Italy, perfecting his art.

His was an illustrator for publishers, including one for an edition of William Shakespeare's The Merry Wives of Windsor.

Later in his life, he served as a curator at the Schleissheim Palace.

Lossow died on 19 May 1897, in Schleissheim, Austria Hungary.

== Gallery ==
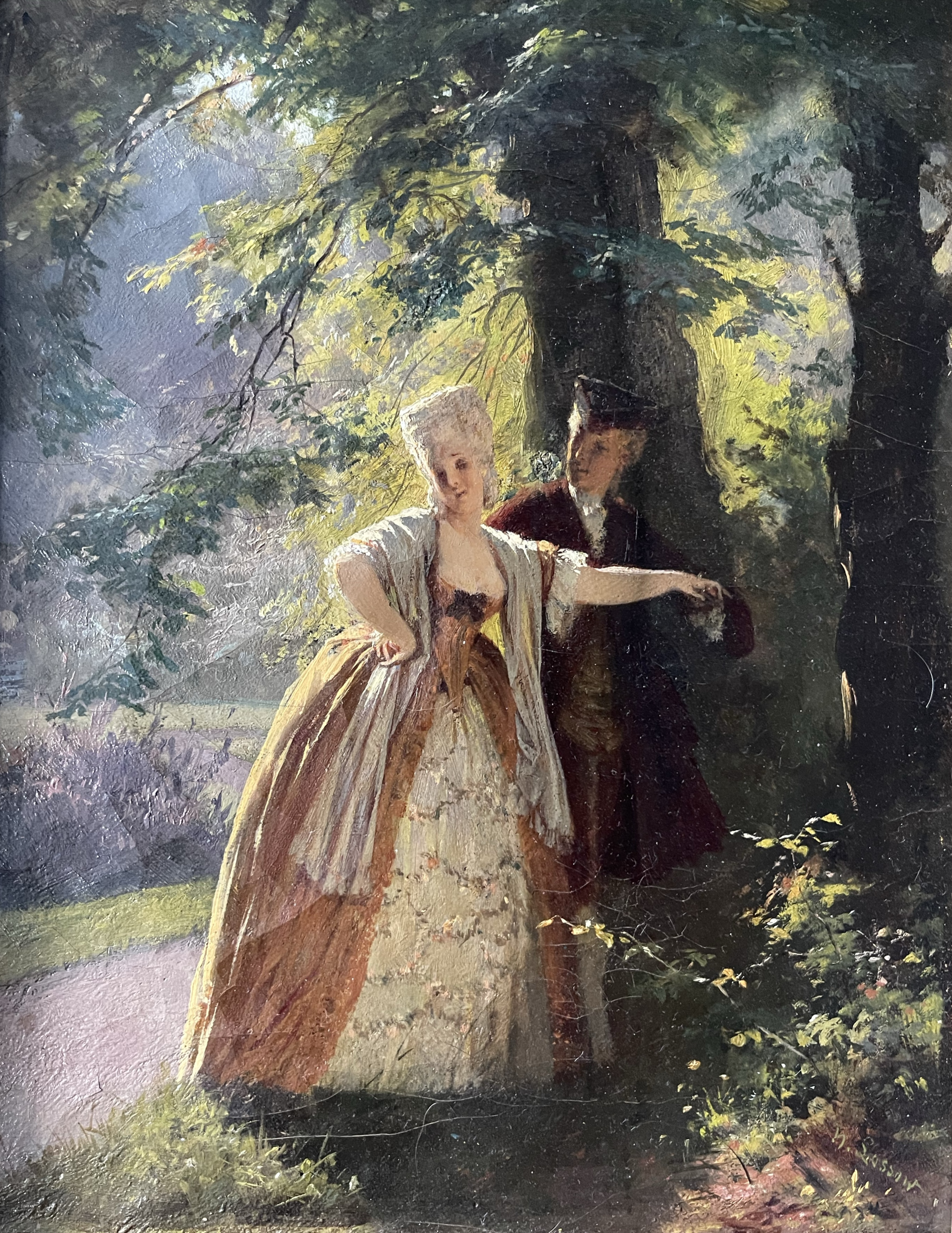
Feigned Innocence (1870)

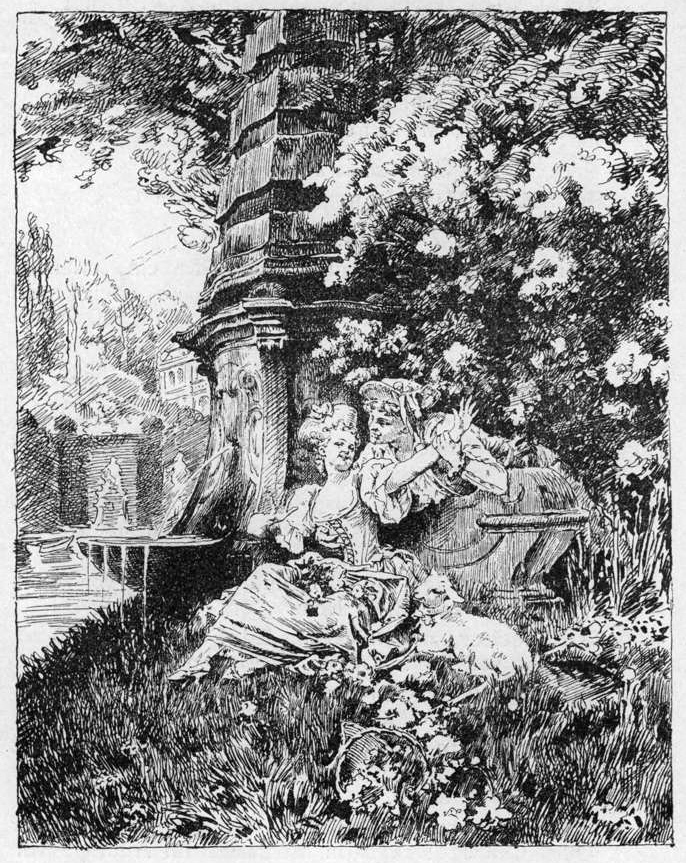
Illustration for Glaspalast München (1883)

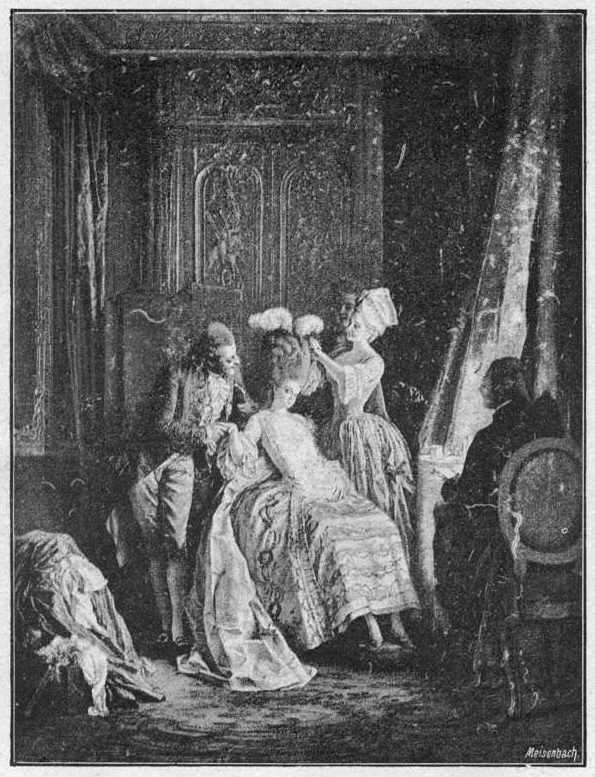
Illustration for Glaspalast München (1888)

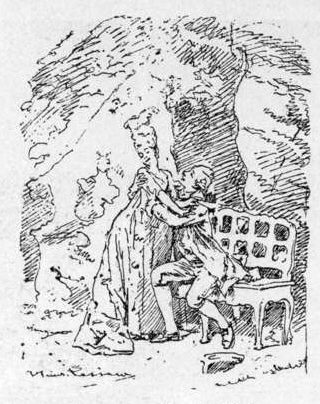
Illustration for Glaspalast München (1890)

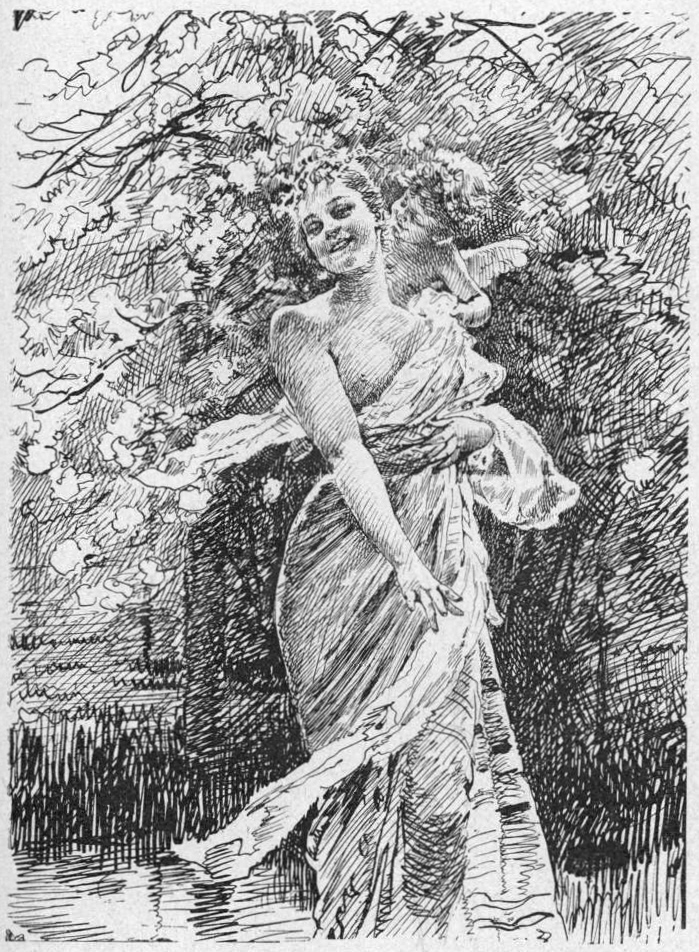
Illustration for Glaspalast München (1891)

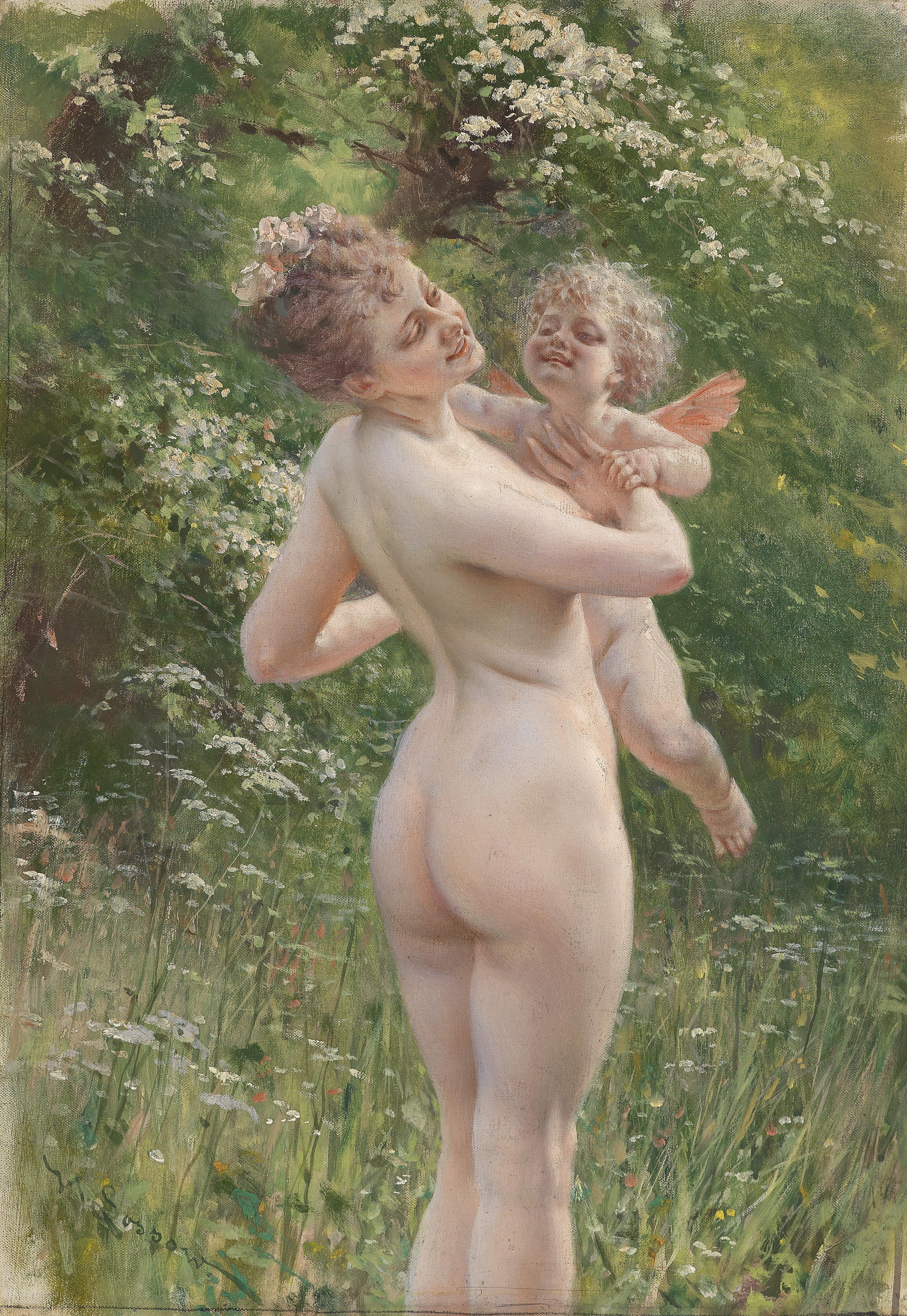
Love Whispers (1897)

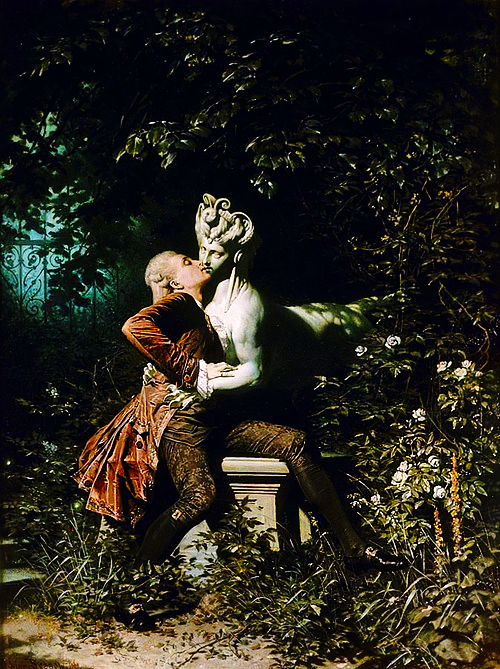
The Sphinx and the Poet (1868)

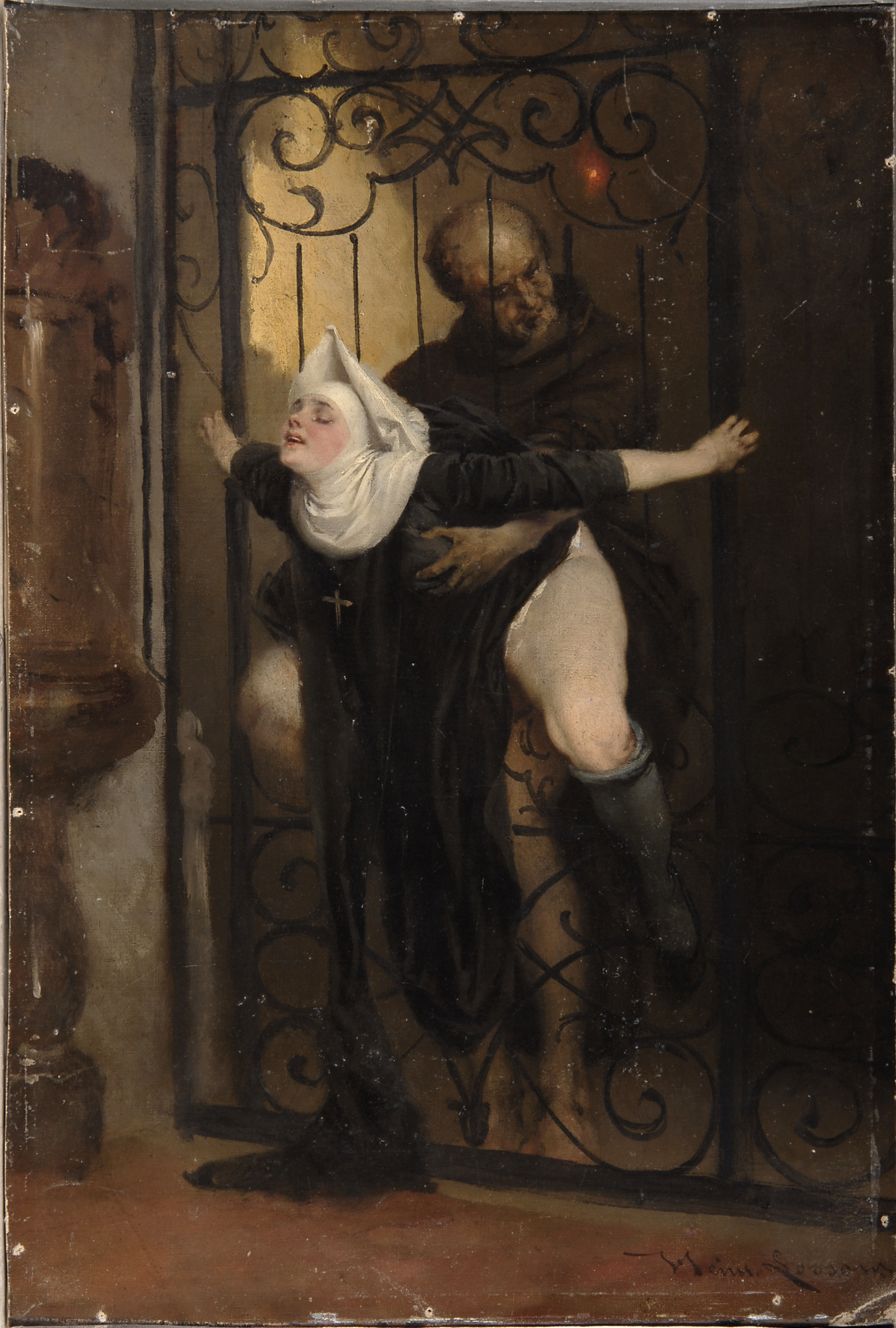
The Sin (1880), an image concerning the Banquet of Chestnuts

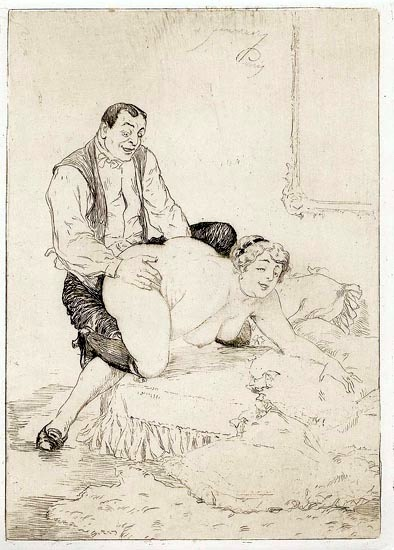
Part of the Her Faithful Servant series

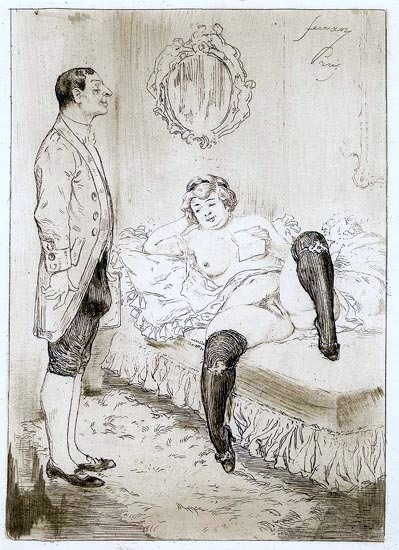
Part of the Her Faithful Servant series

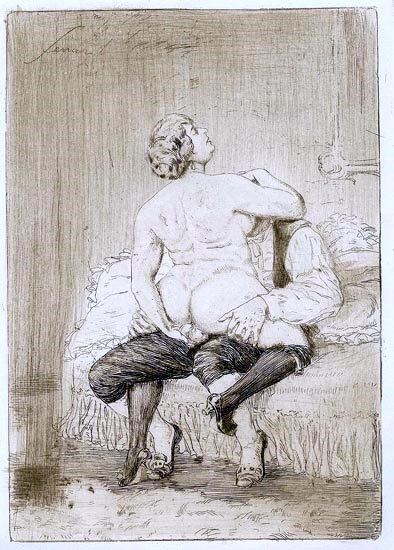
Part of the Her Faithful Servant series

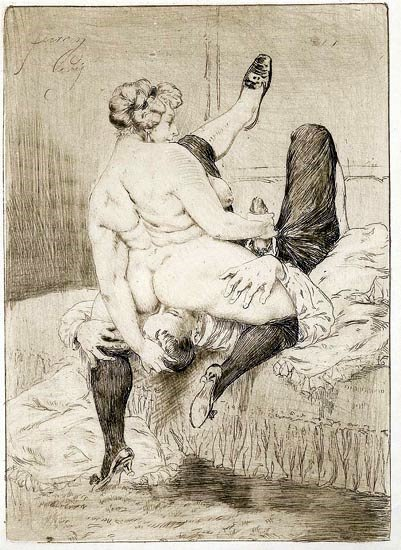
Part of the Her Faithful Servant series

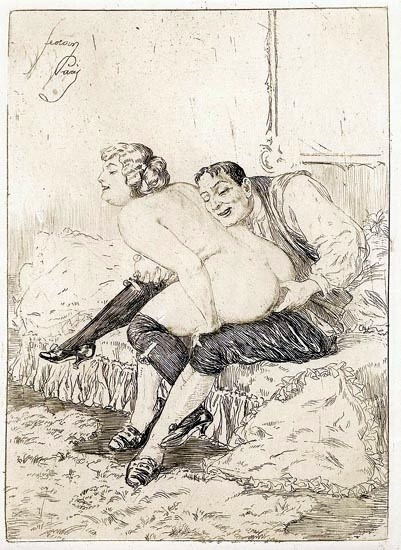
Part of the Her Faithful Servant series
