= A World Lit Only by Fire (album) =

Studio album by Godflesh
- Released: 7 October 2014
- Recorded: 2012–2014
- Studio: Justin Broadrick's home studio in Wales
- Genre: Industrial metal
- Length: 53:57
- Label: Avalanche
- Producer: Justin Broadrick

Godflesh chronology
Decline & Fall (2014)	A World Lit Only by Fire (2014)	Post Self (2017)

Singles from A World Lit Only by Fire
- 1. "New Dark Ages" Released: 5 August 2014; 2. "Imperator" Released: 17 September 2014

A World Lit Only by Fire is the seventh studio album by English industrial metal band Godflesh. It was released on 7 October 2014 through frontman Justin Broadrick's own label, Avalanche Recordings, and was the band's first full-length album since 2001's Hymns. It was preceded by the digital singles "New Dark Ages" in August 2014 and "Imperator" in September 2014, and it was followed by several international tours.

Musically, A World Lit Only by Fire is a particularly heavy album driven by repetitive machine percussion, frontman Justin Broadrick's employment of an eight-string guitar and B. C. Green's distorted bass. Broadrick's low, guttural vocals explore the brutality of humankind and the corruption power brings, an approach partially inspired by the book from which the album derives its title. A World Lit Only by Fire was the band's first album to chart in America, peaking at positions 25 and 22 on the Tastemakers and Top Heatseekers charts respectively. Godflesh released a companion remix album titled A World Lit Only by Dub on 6 December 2024.

As Godflesh's comeback album after dissolving in 2002, it was the goal of Broadrick and Green to do more than just exploit the media attention of their reformation. Both the album and its preceding EP, Decline & Fall (2014), underwent a long recording and revision process, ultimately culminating in two critically acclaimed releases lauded by some critics as the ideal return for Godflesh; Exclaim! awarded A World Lit Only by Fire a perfect score, and Terrorizer named it the best album of 2014.

== Background ==
After dissolving Godflesh in 2002, frontman Justin Broadrick formed the bands Jesu and Greymachine and released music under various monikers, including Final and JK Flesh; B. C. Green, Godflesh's other founding member, spent the time quietly, finishing school and focusing on his relationship with his partner. Though Broadrick quickly became interested in writing music under the Godflesh title again, he presumed the band to be permanently dead. He and Green remained friendly throughout the 2000s, but they rarely if ever spoke about the band. In 2009, though, Broadrick decided to approach Green with the idea of reforming Godflesh. The latter responded enthusiastically, and in November of that year, the reunion was made official with the announcement that Godflesh would be performing at a 2010 festival in France.

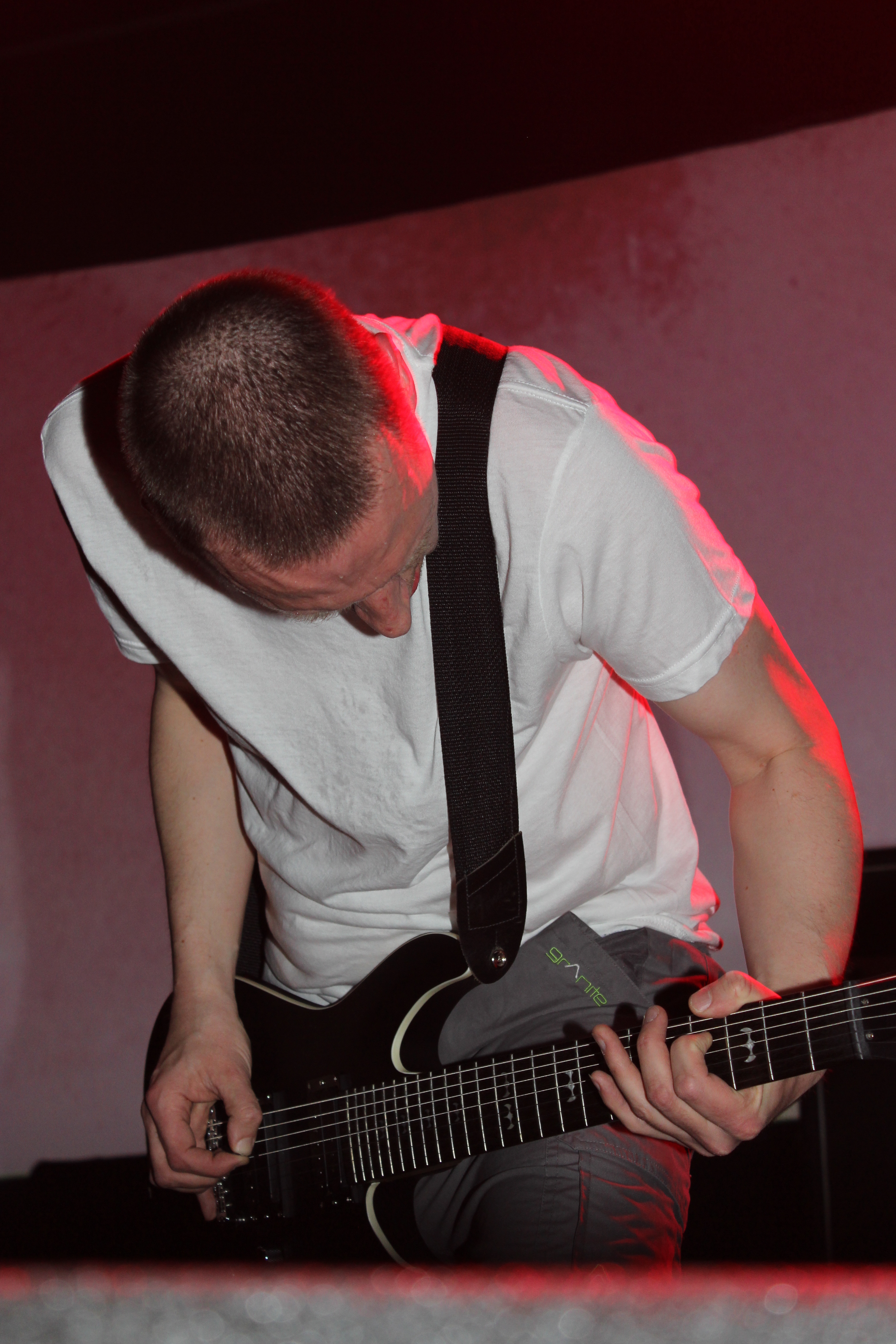
Justin Broadrick performing with Godflesh in 2014

Initially, both Broadrick and Green said that Godflesh would not commit to recording any new material, insisting that the chance of another studio album was unlikely. However, Broadrick later confirmed that the entire point of the reformation was "fundamentally about wanting to make new music". In 2012, the band started recording A World Lit Only by Fire in Broadrick's home studio in Wales. On 2 June 2014, Godflesh released the Decline & Fall EP, featuring songs cut from the upcoming album for being colourful outliers that would have put it over Broadrick's desired ten-song length. On 7 October 2014, after several delays, A World Lit Only by Fire was released. Originally, the album was to be followed by a remix release titled A World Lit Only by Fire in Dub. Ted Parsons of Prong, who had previously drummed on Hymns (2001) and toured with Godflesh, was set to provide additional live percussion. In an interview with the French publication La Grosse Radio, Broadrick stated that the release would explore Godflesh's post-punk side. This dub album ultimately saw release without Parsons' involvement in late 2024 as A World Lit Only by Dub.

A key component to Godflesh's reformation and comeback album was the reintegration of a drum machine into the band. Broadrick believed that the addition of a human drummer to the Godflesh dynamic was largely detrimental, calling it a dilution of his original goal that, despite yielding "quite amazing" results, took the project away from its initial point of man–machine fusion. The mechanical percussion used on A World Lit Only by Fire facilitated Broadrick's groove- and beat-focused writing style, and it allowed him to be more deliberate in the composition process; this eased one of the primary difficulties in creating the album: the pressure to rush out a product and exploit the reunion's media attention. Broadrick was surprised that interest in the band persisted even while he and Green were in their private studio, writing and deconstructing and rewriting songs multiple times over.

== Composition and style ==
"[A World Lit Only by Fire] is getting straight back to the core of what this is all about [...] It's like refocusing and obviously, we're somewhat older and wiser. It's going to be a really interesting record. It's extremely minimal and very, very brutal—a fairly unforgiving record, really, I think."

— Justin Broadrick on the tone of A World Lit Only by Fire

Musically, A World Lit Only by Fire is an exceptionally heavy, bleak and mechanical album driven, as Godflesh's earliest and most influential releases were, by machine percussion. Unlike those first EPs and albums, though, A World Lit Only by Fire features Broadrick using an eight-string guitar; according to him, this choice was made so he could "tune even lower" than before and "achieve more complex dissonant chords and riffs". The album is slow and deliberately simple, focused on intense repetition; Broadrick regularly described it as direct, brutal, dissonant and minimal. Several noted the tone of the album as especially heavy and unforgiving. Many critics favourably compared A World Lit Only by Fire to Godflesh's first few releases (namely, 1988's self-titled EP, 1989's Streetcleaner and 1992's Pure). Denise Falzon of Exclaim! wrote, "it's as if no time has passed; it could be mistaken for a lost recording from the band's early days if not for the impeccable production", and Pitchfork's Brandon Stosuy said that the band "managed to expand upon what they did best without losing any of the original burn". José Carlos Santos of Terrorizer called the balance of past and present perfect, and PopMatters' Dean Brown praised the album for both respecting Godflesh's early material and focusing on the future. Broadrick and Green acknowledged the album's regressive attitude; about it, the former said, "It will definitely sound aggressive and it probably won't sound like any of the other records we've made, but it will have the minimalism of the first few records". Green echoed his bandmate's sentiment, saying that A World Lit Only by Fire is in the spirit of Streetcleaner and Pure.

"Deadend"
"Deadend" is an example of the album's heightened aggression.

The album's first song and lead single, "New Dark Ages", is a slowly building piece with a guitar sound that Gregory Heaney of AllMusic described as an "impossibly detuned, nearly atonal chug". The song, focused on a simple, looping groove that Tom Breihan of Stereogum called a "ferocious methodical pummel", was compared to the opening track from Streetcleaner, "Like Rats", by Falzon. After the percussion introduction and incorporation of the same repeating riff, Broadrick's delivers guttural, typically sparse vocals with Biblical and medieval overtones. The second song on the album, "Deadend", immediately launches into a weighty barrage of downtuned guitar and crushing bass. Like that of "New Dark Ages", the riff repeats and dominates the sonic landscape.

The third track of A World Lit Only by Fire, "Shut Me Down", was the only song of the album to be written prior to Godflesh's split in 2002. It is based around a sample of Public Enemy's 1991 song "Shut 'Em Down", from which it also derived its title. This sample is one of the only audible examples of a sound not produced by a drum machine, Broadrick's guitar and vocals or Green's bass. Like the preceding songs, "Shut Me Down" is heavily riff-focused. The atmosphere of A World Lit Only by Fire shifts on its fourth track, "Life Giver Life Taker", which is less overtly heavy than the first three, focusing instead on post-punk dreariness and spectral sounds while further emphasising percussive repetition. This continues into "Obeyed", which features a more stretched and expansive tone. Lars Gotrich of NPR described the song as haunted and scourged.

"Carrion"
"Carrion's" introduction is an example of the album's extreme weight and repetition.

"Curse Us All" the album's sixth and shortest track, is acutely aggressive and unrelenting with a structure that James Barry of Clash called incredibly effective in its simplicity. "Curse Us All" flows into "Carrion", a song that Barry called "a horrific robotic monster". Like "Head Dirt" from Streetcleaner, the first half of "Carrion" comprises an active, pummeling song with a brutally minimal central riff, while the latter half decays into feedback and extremes degrees of distortion. The eighth track and second single of A World Lit Only by Fire, "Imperator", is a droning song with Broadrick employing a clean, eerily tranquil style of singing rather than his characteristic growls. Gregory Adams of Exclaim! called the track "high-grade industrial damage", and wrote, "thick and meaty, detuned guitar chug is paired with a percussive stomp of a million-robot-deep militia". MetalSucks wrote about the song that Broadrick and Green "both seem to be trying to set a new record for the heaviest tones ever achieved on their respective instruments; if they had a real drummer, he’d need to play on a kit made from rocks just to try and compete"; Kez Whelan of Terrorizer concurred, calling Green's bass "thunderous" and Broadrick's riffs "humongous". Andy O'Connor of Pitchfork noted that the "grating repetition" of "Imperator" was reminiscent of Swans, a band that was a major early inspiration for Godflesh.

The two final and longest songs of A World Lit Only by Fire, "Towers of Emptiness" and Forgive Our Fathers", are both weighty tracks that conclude with Broadrick melancholically repeating the titles over a background of sinister sounds. The former has a grinding riff and an expansive compositional structure. Jason Heller of Pitchfork described the latter as "particularly gorgeous", with a sound of "lingering anguish in an apocalyptic fugue", and Barry called it "epic". Included on the Japanese and Bandcamp versions of A World Lit Only by Fire were three remixes done by Broadrick. These versions are stripped down and extended from the original tracks, with two bearing the dub label.

=== Theme and title ===
Thematically, A World Lit Only by Fire is a reflection on the brutality of humankind. Inspired by the 1992 William Manchester book of the same name, much of A World Lit Only by Fire deals with corruption of religion and the savagery of people. Broadrick described the theme by saying:

A lot of the frustration of Godflesh is internal – it's the human condition, the frailty, and that we're essentially amoral. There's so little to sway us. It's a resignation to the fact that we're just beasts, and the world always has been and always will be lit only by fire. We've always been primal, and we still are. We see it in all four corners of the globe. Savagery happens everywhere, even in our own backyards. So, it's looking at oneself and being disgusted, but also resigned. You are good and you are evil, and there's very little in between sometimes.

== Touring ==
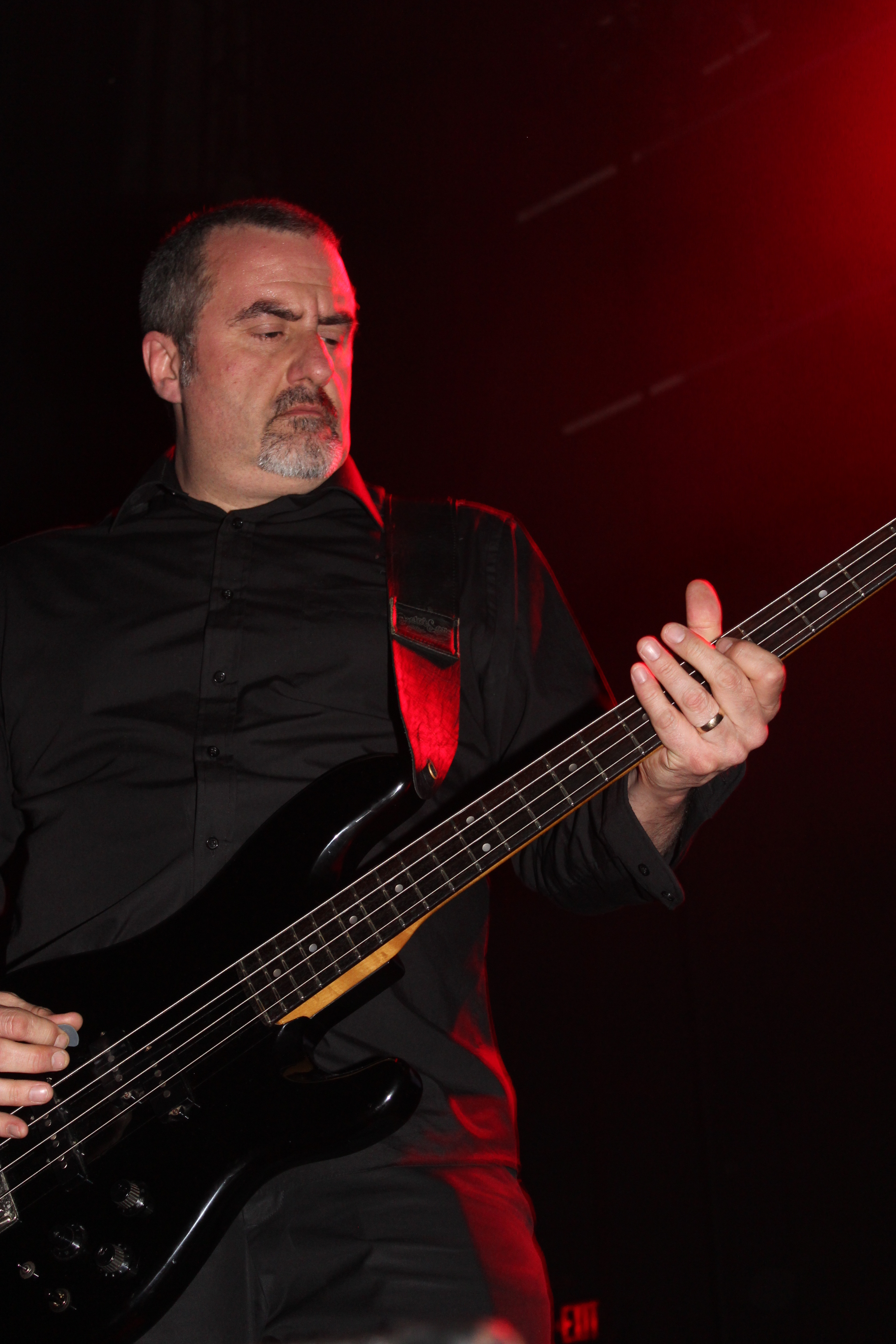
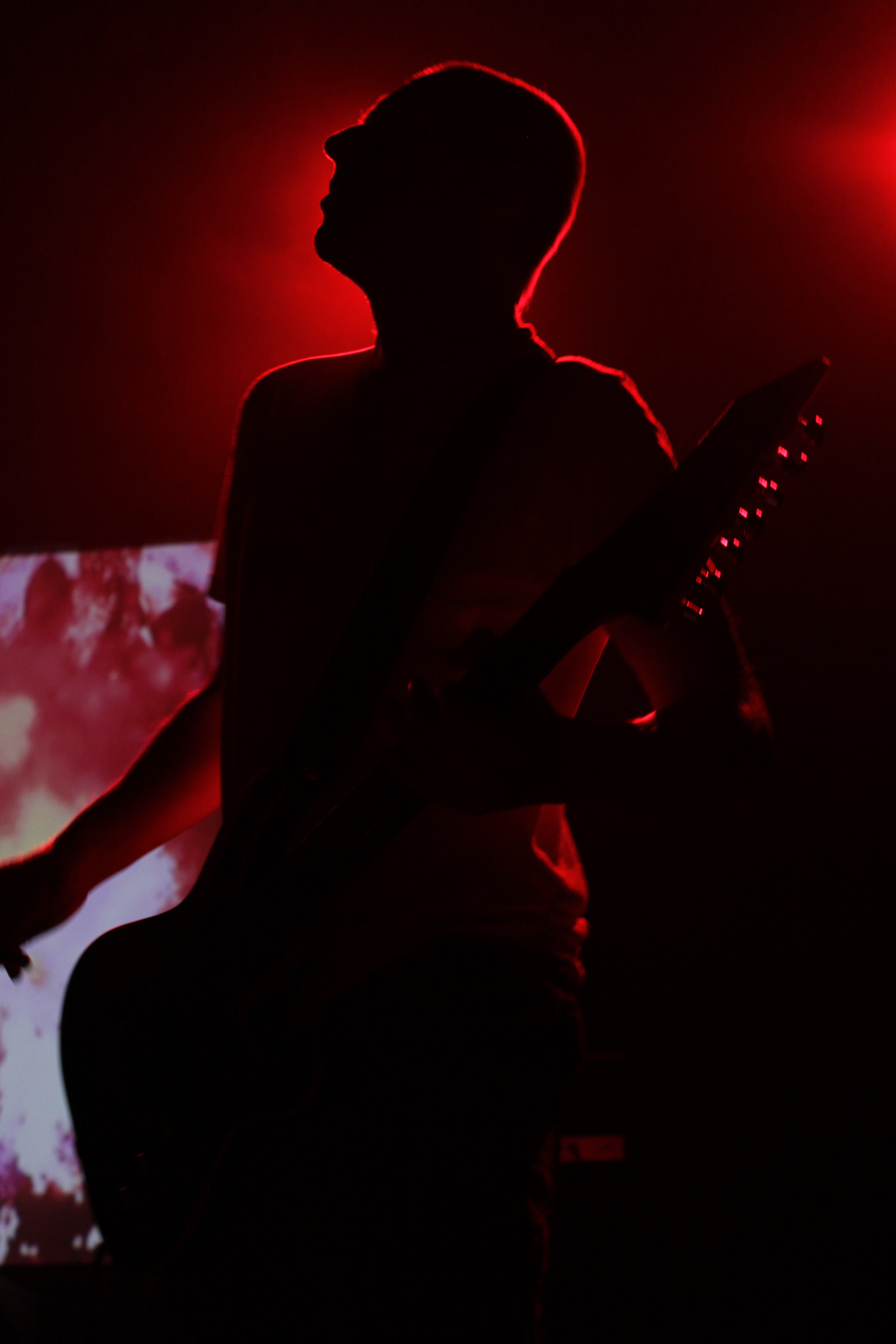
B. C. Green and Justin Broadrick supporting A World Lit Only by Fire live

Despite encountering visa issues, Godflesh toured North America and Europe throughout 2014. The band coheadlined shows with Loop (whose frontman, Robert Hampson, toured with Godflesh in 1991 and 1992 and contributed on Pure) and was later supported by opening acts Prurient and Khost. Through June, the only song from A World Lit Only by Fire played was "New Dark Ages", the album's lead single, while most others were from Streetcleaner. Broadrick described the profusion of classic material as "necessary" while he and Green reacclimated to Godflesh in preparation of writing new songs. Another reason for leaning so heavily upon early Godflesh music was because Broadrick wanted to cover as much of the globe as possible, playing their more well-known early releases, so they could guiltlessly focus on performing much of the next album when it came out.

When the tour picked back up in December after the release of A World Lit Only by Fire, the majority of the set lists were taken up with new songs. This trend continued through 2015, with Godflesh performing half the album per concert. For the shows in support of A World Lit Only by Fire, Green and Broadrick played over preprogrammed drum machine loops, and apocalyptic imagery was projected onto a backdrop. As he did on the album, Broadrick performed with an eight-string guitar.

Typical 2014–2015 Godflesh set list
1. "New Dark Ages" *
2. "Deadend" *
3. "Shut Me Down" *
4. "Life Give Life Taker" *
5. "Carrion" *
6. "Towers of Emptiness" *
7. "Christbait Rising"
8. "Streetcleaner"
9. "Spite"
10. "Crush My Soul"
11. "Like Rats"
"*" indicates a song from A World Lit Only by Fire

== Release ==
On 5 August 2014 (a month after the release of Decline & Fall), the first track from A World Lit Only by Fire, "New Dark Ages", was released for streaming. It was followed by a second single, "Imperator", on 17 September 2014. A World Lit Only by Fire saw worldwide release on 7 October 2014, and all versions featured cover art taken from the 1933 experimental film Lot in Sodom by James Sibley Watson and Melville Webber. The Japanese and digital versions included three remixes done by Broadrick. In 2019, Broadrick's label, Avalanche Recordings, released an album by Celer known as Plays Godflesh; it is composed entirely of ambient samples from A World Lit Only by Fire.

=== Critical reception ===
Professional ratings
Aggregate scores
Source	Rating
Metacritic	85/100
Review scores
Source	Rating
AllMusic	4/5 stars
Alternative Press	4.5/5 stars
Clash	8/10
Exclaim!	10/10
Kerrang!	4/5 stars
The Guardian	4/5 stars
Metal Hammer	4/5 stars
Mojo	4/5 stars
Pitchfork	8/10
PopMatters	7/10

A World Lit Only by Fire was met with very positive reception; it received an average score of 85/100 from 10 reviews on Metacritic, indicating "universal acclaim". AllMusic's Gregory Heaney wrote that "A World Lit Only by Fire makes it crystal clear that Godflesh have a long, unfailing memory, and that their punishing work has only just begun." Clash critic James Barry described the album as "a brave record" and stated, "there’s nothing nostalgic here—it’s the sound of a band reborn, rather than one reformed." Denise Falzon of Exclaim! gave the album a perfect score and said, "Complete with bleak, nihilistic themes, A World Lit Only by Fire is every bit the record fans have been waiting over a dozen years for." Writing for The Guardian, Dom Lawson described the album as "a sustained and hypnotic march through minimalist, post-Sabbath landscapes, and crucifyingly heavy on every level." Pitchfork critic Jason Heller said, "As a whole, A World Lit Only by Fire represents music converted into motion—kinetic and mechanical, inexorable and inhuman." Heller further stated that Godflesh "has never sounded so relentless."

Zachary Houle of PopMatters wrote, "A World Lit Only by Fire is revisionist industrial and the soundscapes of this brittle disc leaves you wondering what on earth just hit you." Houle went on to say that the album "basically rewrites the rule book for industrial". Lars Gotrich of NPR said that A World Lit Only by Fire was "one of those reunion albums that wasn't only better than it should've been, but a reclamation and reinvention for Justin Broadrick and G. C. Green." Writing for Metal Injection, Jeremy Ulrey said, "A World Lit Only by Fire will eventually go down as an elite Godflesh album not for the era(s) it recreates, but for the strength of material. Much like the Decline & Fall EP, this album has an embarrassment of riches". Mojo described the album as "brilliantly brutal", and Kerrang! wrote that it "effortlessly recaptures the visceral appeal of their early days".

=== Accolades ===
Along with acclaim upon release, A World Lit Only by Fire appeared on many publications' year-end lists. Pitchfork praised the album for living up to Godflesh's early releases, and Rolling Stone wrote, "Sculpted out of scrap metal and bloody sinew, it's a monument to what [Broadrick] sees as a new Dark Age where humanity still breeds like rats under a fiery, polluted sky". Stereogum appreciated how the album began as impressively heavy, forming "a sea of heaving industrial", and managed to maintain the aggression throughout. Terrorizer selected A World Lit Only by Fire as their album of the year and said that it ruled "over anything else the year had to offer".

Year	Publication	Country	Accolade	Rank	Ref.
2014	Decibel	United States	"Top 40 Albums of 2014"	5	
2014	Pitchfork	United States	"The Best Metal Albums of 2014"	7	
2014	PopMatters	United States	"The Best Metal of 2014"	7	
2014	The Quietus	United Kingdom	"Albums of the Year 2014"	95	
2014	Revolver	United States	"20 Best Albums of 2014"	11	
2014	Rolling Stone	United States	"20 Best Metal Albums of 2014"	7	
2014	Stereogum	United States	"The 50 Best Metal Albums of 2014"	27	
2014	Terrorizer	United Kingdom	"Critics' Top 50 Albums of 2014"	1	

== Track listing ==
All songs written by Justin Broadrick and B. C. Green.

No.	Title	Length
1.	"New Dark Ages"	4:51
2.	"Deadend"	5:07
3.	"Shut Me Down"	4:26
4.	"Life Giver Life Taker"	5:27
5.	"Obeyed"	5:35
6.	"Curse Us All"	3:46
7.	"Carrion"	6:05
8.	"Imperator"	4:26
9.	"Towers of Emptiness"	6:34
10.	"Forgive Our Fathers"	7:40
Total length:		53:57

Bandcamp and Japanese bonus tracks
No.	Title	Length
11.	"Shut Me Down" (Version)	6:22
12.	"New Dark Dub"	6:26
13.	"Imperator" (Version Dub)	9:18
Total length:		76:08

== Personnel ==
All credits adapted from A World Lit Only by Fire liner notes

- Justin Broadrick – vocals, eight-string guitar, machines and production
- B. C. Green – bass guitar

== Charts ==
Chart (2014)	Peak position
US Billboard Tastemakers	25
US Billboard Heatseekers	22
