= List of 2010 albums =

The following is a list of albums, EPs, and mixtapes released in 2010. These albums are (1) original, i.e. excluding reissues, remasters, and compilations of previously released recordings, and (2) notable, defined as having received significant coverage from reliable sources independent of the subject.

For additional information for deaths of musicians and for links to other music lists, see 2010 in music.

== First quarter ==
=== January ===
List of albums released in January 2010
Go to: January | February | March | April | May | June | July | August | September | October | November | December | Back to top
Release date	Artist	Album	Genre	Label	Ref.
January 1	Kesha	Animal	Electropop, dance-pop	RCA, Sony Music	
January 4	Lana Del Rey	Lana Del Ray	Alternative pop	5 Points	
January 5	The Dear & Departed	Chapters		Equal Vision	
January 5	Kanye West	VH1 Storytellers	Hip-hop	Roc-A-Fella, Def Jam	
January 5	Katharine McPhee	Unbroken	Pop	Verve Forecast	
January 10	Grimes	Geidi Primes	Dream pop	Arbutus	
January 11	Adam Green	Minor Love	Anti-folk, garage rock	Rough Trade	
January 11	Delphic	Acolyte	Alternative dance	Polydor, Dangerbird, Modular	
January 11	Heidi Montag	Superficial	Electropop, dance-pop	Pratt Productions, Warner	
January 11	Vampire Weekend	Contra	Indie pop, worldbeat	XL	
January 11	You Me at Six	Hold Me Down	Alternative rock, pop-punk	Virgin	
January 12	The Bouncing Souls	Ghosts on the Boardwalk	Punk rock	Chunksaah	
January 12	OK Go	Of the Blue Colour of the Sky	Alternative rock, power pop	Capitol, EMI	
January 12	Owen Pallett	Heartland	Baroque pop	Domino	
January 12	Ringo Starr	Y Not	Rock	Hip-O, UM^{e}	
January 12	Woodpigeon	Die Stadt Muzikanten	Indie folk	Boompa, End of the Road	
January 13	Lostprophets	The Betrayed	Alternative rock, alternative metal, hard rock	Visible Noise	
January 15	Spoon	Transference	Indie rock	Merge	
January 18	These New Puritans	Hidden	Art rock	Angular, Domino	
January 19	A Hero A Fake	Let Oceans Lie	Progressive metal, metalcore	Victory	
January 19	Dessa	A Badly Broken Code	Hip-hop, alternative hip-hop	Doomtree	
January 19	Eels	End Times	Indie rock	Vagrant, E Works	
January 19	Motion City Soundtrack	My Dinosaur Life	Emo, pop-punk	Columbia	
January 19	RJD2	The Colossus	Hip-hop, electronica, alternative rock	RJ's Electrical Connections	
January 19	Surfer Blood	Astro Coast	Indie rock	Kanine	
January 19	Various artists	Crazy Heart: Original Motion Picture Soundtrack		New West	
January 20	Alexandros	Where's My Potato?	Alternative rock, indie rock, punk	RX-Records	
January 20	Corinne Bailey Rae	The Sea	Soul, R&B, pop rock	Virgin	
January 20	Joel Alme	Waiting for the Bells		Razzia	
January 22	Nitzer Ebb	Industrial Complex	EBM	Metropolis	
January 22	Suicide Commando	Implements of Hell	Industrial metal	Metropolis	
January 25	Four Tet	There Is Love in You	Folktronica	Domino	
January 25	Jaga Jazzist	One-Armed Bandit	Post-rock, progressive rock, jazz fusion	Ninja Tune	
January 25	Tindersticks	Falling Down a Mountain	Chamber pop	4AD, Constellation	
January 26	Alesana	The Emptiness	Post-hardcore	Fearless	
January 26	Barry Manilow	The Greatest Love Songs of All Time	Pop	Arista	
January 26	Basia Bulat	Heart of My Own	Folk	Secret City	
January 26	Beach House	Teen Dream	Dream pop	Sub Pop, Bella Union	
January 26	Los Campesinos!	Romance Is Boring	Indie rock	Wichita, Arts & Crafts	
January 26	Day of Fire	Losing All	Post-grunge	Razor & Tie	
January 26	Fozzy	Chasing the Grail	Heavy metal	Riot!	
January 26	Lady Antebellum	Need You Now	Country	Capitol Nashville	
January 26	Living Sacrifice	The Infinite Order	Groove metal, metalcore	Solid State	
January 26	Locksley	Be in Love		Feature Records	
January 26	The Magnetic Fields	Realism	Indie rock	Nonesuch	
January 26	Never Shout Never	What Is Love?		Loveway Records, Sire, Warner Bros.	
January 26	Nocando	Jimmy the Lock	Hip-hop	Alpha Pup	
January 26	Number One Gun	To the Secrets and Knowledge	Christian rock	Tooth & Nail	
January 26	Patty Griffin	Downtown Church	Gospel	Credential	
January 26	Strong Arm Steady	In Search of Stoney Jackson	Hip-hop	Stones Throw	
January 26	The Wonder Years	The Upsides	Pop-punk	No Sleep	
January 26	Woodhands	Remorsecapade		Paper Bag	
January 28	Hot Chip	One Life Stand	Alternative dance, synth-pop, indietronica	Parlophone	
January 28	Various artists	WWE The Music: A New Day, Vol. 10	Rock, pop, dance	WWE Music Group	
January 29	Groove Armada	Black Light	Dance-pop, electropop, electronic	Cooking Vinyl	
January 29	Overkill	Ironbound	Thrash metal	eOne Music, Nuclear Blast	

=== February ===
List of albums released in February 2010
Go to: January | February | March | April | May | June | July | August | September | October | November | December | Back to top
Release date	Artist	Album	Genre	Label	Ref.
February 1	Apparatjik	We Are Here	Alternative rock	Meta Merge Un	
February 1	BT	These Hopeful Machines	Electronica	Black Hole	
February 1	Kashmir	Trespassers		Columbia, Sony Music	
February 1	The Knife in collaboration with Mt. Sims and Planningtorock	Tomorrow, in a Year		Rabid	
February 1	Midlake	The Courage of Others	Folk rock	Bella Union	
February 1	Ocean Colour Scene	Saturday	Alternative rock, indie rock	Cooking Vinyl	
February 2	Butch Walker	I Liked It Better When You Had No Heart	Alternative rock, pop rock	One Haven Music	
February 2	Disco Biscuits	Planet Anthem			
February 2	Dommin	Love Is Gone	Gothic rock	Roadrunner	
February 2	Lil Wayne	Rebirth	Rap rock	Young Money, Cash Money, Universal Motown	
February 2	Nick Jonas & the Administration	Who I Am	Blues rock, R&B, blue-eyed soul	Hollywood	
February 2	Rob Zombie	Hellbilly Deluxe 2	Industrial metal, alternative metal	Roadrunner	
February 2	The Soft Pack	The Soft Pack	Indie rock	Kemado	
February 2	Statik Selektah	100 Proof: The Hangover	Hip-hop	ShowOff Records, Brick Records	
February 2	Through the Eyes of the Dead	Skepsis	Deathcore, technical death metal	Prosthetic	
February 5	Fear Factory	Mechanize	Industrial metal	Candlelight, AFM	
February 5	Fionn Regan	The Shadow of an Empire	Folk	Heavenly, Universal Music Ireland	
February 5	Rage	Strings to a Web	Power metal, heavy metal, symphonic metal	Nuclear Blast	
February 5	Sade	Soldier of Love	Pop-soul	Epic	
February 5	TobyMac	Tonight	Christian rock, pop, rap rock	ForeFront	
February 8	Gil Scott-Heron	I'm New Here	Blues, electronica, post-industrial	XL	
February 8	HIM	Screamworks: Love in Theory and Practice	Alternative rock	Sire	
February 8	Massive Attack	Heligoland	Electronica	Virgin	
February 8	Ov Hell	The Underworld Regime	Black metal	Indie Recordings, Prosthetic	
February 8	Yeasayer	Odd Blood	Experimental rock	Secretly Canadian	
February 9	Arsis	Starve for the Devil	Melodic death metal, technical death metal	Nuclear Blast	
February 9	DJ Kay Slay	More Than Just a DJ	Hip-hop	eOne	
February 9	Fair	Disappearing World		Tooth & Nail	
February 9	Fireflight	For Those Who Wait	Christian rock	Flicker	
February 9	Jaheim	Another Round		Atlantic	
February 9	Josh Turner	Haywire	Country	MCA Nashville	
February 9	Look What I Did	Atlas Drugged	Post-hardcore, progressive rock, pop-punk	Modernist Movement Recordings	
February 9	Phantogram	Eyelid Movies		Barsuk	
February 12	Angels & Airwaves	Love	Alternative rock	To the Stars	
February 12	Peter Gabriel	Scratch My Back	Art pop	Real World, Virgin	
February 15	Field Music	Field Music (Measure)	Indie rock	Memphis Industries	
February 15	Lightspeed Champion	Life Is Sweet! Nice to Meet You	Folk	Domino	
February 15	Marina and the Diamonds	The Family Jewels	Alternative pop	679, Atlantic	
February 15	Pet Shop Boys	Pandemonium	Synth-pop	Parlophone	
February 16	Carnifex	Hell Chose Me	Deathcore, death metal	Victory	
February 16	Chelsea Grin	Desolation of Eden	Deathcore	Artery, Razor & Tie	
February 16	Close Your Eyes	We Will Overcome	Melodic hardcore, post-hardcore, pop-punk	Victory	
February 16	Juliana Hatfield	Peace and Love	Indie rock	Ye Olde Records	
February 16	The Souljazz Orchestra	Rising Sun		Strut	
February 16	Story of the Year	The Constant	Pop-punk, post-hardcore	Epitaph	
February 17	Finntroll	Nifelvind	Folk metal, black metal	Century Media	
February 17	Two Door Cinema Club	Tourist History	Indie rock	Kitsuné	
February 19	Eluveitie	Everything Remains (As It Never Was)	Folk metal, melodic death metal, Celtic metal	Nuclear Blast	
February 22	Autechre	Oversteps	IDM	Warp	
February 22	The Courteeners	Falcon	Indie rock	A&M	
February 22	Efterklang	Magic Chairs	Indie pop	4AD	
February 22	Elephant9	Walk the Nile		Rune Grammofon	
February 23	Ali Farka Touré and Toumani Diabaté	Ali and Toumani	African blues	World Circuit	
February 23	Alkaline Trio	This Addiction	Punk rock	Epitaph	
February 23	The Brian Jonestown Massacre	Who Killed Sgt. Pepper?	Neo-psychedelia, electronic	A Records	
February 23	Cindy Blackman	Another Lifetime	Jazz fusion	4Q	
February 23	Electric President	The Violent Blue	Electronic	Fake Four Inc.	
February 23	Holly Miranda	The Magician's Private Library	Indie rock	XL	
February 23	Joanna Newsom	Have One on Me	Indie folk	Drag City	
February 23	Johnny Cash	American VI: Ain't No Grave	Americana	American Recordings, Lost Highway	
February 23	Newworldson	Newworldson	CCM	Inpop	
February 23	Quasi	American Gong	Indie rock	Kill Rock Stars	
February 23	The Rocket Summer	Of Men and Angels	Pop rock	Island Def Jam	
February 23	Shearwater	The Golden Archipelago	Indie rock	Matador	
February 23	Shout Out Louds	Work	Indie rock	Merge	
February 23	Starfield	The Saving One	CCM	Sparrow	
February 23	Xiu Xiu	Dear God, I Hate Myself	Experimental rock, indie rock	Kill Rock Stars	
February 23	Zeus	Say Us	Alternative rock, indie	Arts & Crafts	
February 24	Dark Tranquillity	We Are the Void	Heavy metal	Century Media	
February 26	Ellie Goulding	Lights	Pop	Polydor	
February 26	Jason Derulo	Jason Derulo	Rock, R&B	Beluga Heights, Warner Bros.	

=== March ===
List of albums released in March 2010
Go to: January | February | March | April | May | June | July | August | September | October | November | December | Back to top
Release date	Artist	Album	Genre	Label	Ref.
March 1	Blood Red Shoes	Fire like This	Alternative rock	V2	
March 1	Frightened Rabbit	The Winter of Mixed Drinks	Indie rock	FatCat	
March 2	B. Dolan	Fallen House, Sunken City	Hip-hop	Strange Famous	
March 2	DJ Khaled	Victory	Hip-hop	We the Best, E1	
March 2	Jaguar Love	Hologram Jams	Art punk	Fat Possum	
March 2	Lifehouse	Smoke & Mirrors	Alternative rock	Geffen	
March 2	Meredith Andrews	As Long as It Takes	Contemporary Christian	Word	
March 2	Portugal. The Man	American Ghetto	Psychedelic rock, electronic rock	Equal Vision	
March 2	Rogue Wave	Permalight	Indie rock	Brushfire	
March 2	Satellites & Sirens	Satellites & Sirens			
March 2	Shooter Jennings and Hierophant	Black Ribbons	Hard rock	Black Country Rock	
March 3	Gorillaz	Plastic Beach	Pop, electronic, hip-hop	Parlophone	
March 5	Black Rebel Motorcycle Club	Beat the Devil's Tattoo	Alternative rock	Vagrant	
March 5	Boyzone	Brother	Pop	Polydor	
March 5	New Young Pony Club	The Optimist	Electropop, new wave	The Numbers	
March 5	Sugababes	Sweet 7	Electropop	Island	
March 8	Airbourne	No Guts. No Glory.	Hard rock	Roadrunner	
March 8	Amy Macdonald	A Curious Thing	Pop rock, soft rock	Melodramatic Records, Mercury	
March 8	Goldheart Assembly	Wolves and Thieves		Fierce Panda	
March 8	Gonjasufi	A Sufi and a Killer	Alternative hip-hop	Warp	
March 9	Adie	Just You and Me	Contemporary Christian	BEC	
March 9	Ana Tijoux	1977	Hip-hop, jazz	Nacional	
March 9	The Besnard Lakes	The Besnard Lakes Are the Roaring Night	Indie rock	Jagjaguwar, Outside Music	
March 9	The Bled	Heat Fetish	Hardcore	Rise	
March 9	Broken Bells	Broken Bells	Indie rock	Columbia	
March 9	Chasen	That Was Then, This Is Now			
March 9	Daughters	Daughters	Noise rock	Hydra Head	
March 9	Demon Hunter	The World Is a Thorn	Metalcore, groove metal	Solid State	
March 9	Four Year Strong	Enemy of the World	Pop-punk, melodic hardcore	Decaydance, Universal Motown	
March 9	Gary Allan	Get Off on the Pain	Country	MCA Nashville	
March 9	Jason Collett	Rat a Tat Tat	Indie rock, alternative country	Arts & Crafts	
March 9	Kidz in the Hall	Land of Make Believe	Hip-hop	Duck Down Music	
March 9	Liars	Sisterworld	Experimental rock	Mute	
March 9	Ludacris	Battle of the Sexes	Hip-hop	Disturbing tha Peace, Def Jam	
March 9	Of Mice & Men	Of Mice & Men	Metalcore, post-hardcore	Rise	
March 9	Sanctus Real	Pieces of a Real Heart	Christian rock	Sparrow	
March 9	Selena	La Leyenda	Latin pop	Capitol Latin, EMI, Q-Productions	
March 9	Serj Tankian	Elect the Dead Symphony	Art rock	Reprise, Warner Bros., Serjical Strike	
March 9	Ted Leo and the Pharmacists	The Brutalist Bricks	Art punk, punk rock, indie rock	Matador	
March 9	Titus Andronicus	The Monitor	Indie rock	XL	
March 9	Van Canto	Tribe of Force	A cappella, heavy metal	Napalm	
March 9	Violent Soho	Violent Soho	Alternative rock	Ecstatic Peace!	
March 11	Various artists	Passion: Awakening	Worship	sixsteps	
March 14	Scorpions	Sting in the Tail	Hard rock, heavy metal	Sony Music	
March 15	Dan le Sac vs Scroobius Pip	The Logic of Chance	Hip-hop, electronic	Sunday Best	
March 15	Katatonia	The Longest Year		Peaceville	
March 16	Armored Saint	La Raza	Heavy metal	Metal Blade	
March 16	The Audition	Great Danger	Pop-punk	Victory	
March 16	Danny Brown	The Hybrid	Alternative hip-hop	Rappers I Know, Hybrid Music	
March 16	Drive-By Truckers	The Big To-Do	Alternative country	ATO	
March 16	Fireball Ministry	Fireball Ministry		Restricted Release	
March 16	Flobots	Survival Story	Alternative rock	Universal Republic	
March 16	From First to Last	Throne to the Wolves	Post-hardcore	Rise	
March 16	Jessica Harp	A Woman Needs	Country	Warner Bros. Nashville	
March 16	Julieta Venegas	Otra Cosa	Latin pop		
March 16	Neon Trees	Habits	Alternative rock	Mercury	
March 16	Streetlight Manifesto	99 Songs of Revolution: Vol. 1	Ska punk	Victory, Pentimento	
March 16	The Whigs	In the Dark	Indie rock	ATO	
March 16	Wrench in the Works	Decrease / Increase		Facedown	
March 17	Poets of the Fall	Twilight Theater	Alternative rock	Insomniac Records	
March 17	She & Him	Volume Two	Indie pop	P-Vine, Merge, Double Six	
March 19	Goldfrapp	Head First	Synth-pop, Italo disco	Mute	
March 19	Justin Bieber	My World 2.0	Teen pop	Island	
March 19	Monica	Still Standing	R&B	J	
March 20	MGMT	Congratulations	Indie rock, psychedelic rock, neo-psychedelia	Columbia	
March 22	Laura Marling	I Speak Because I Can	Folk	Virgin	
March 22	Triptykon	Eparistera Daimones	Extreme metal, doom metal, death metal	Prowling Death, Century Media	
March 23	Barenaked Ladies	All in Good Time	Alternative rock	Raisin' Records	
March 23	Belinda	Carpe Diem	Electropop	Capitol Latin	
March 23	The Bird and the Bee	Interpreting the Masters Volume 1: A Tribute to Daryl Hall and John Oates	Indie pop, electronic	Blue Note	
March 23	Bonnie "Prince" Billy and the Cairo Gang	The Wonder Show of the World	Americana, alternative country	Drag City	
March 23	Brotha Lynch Hung	Dinner and a Movie	Hardcore hip-hop, horrorcore, gangsta rap	Strange Music	
March 23	The Dillinger Escape Plan	Option Paralysis	Mathcore	Season of Mist	
March 23	Mindy McCready	I'm Still Here	Country	Linus	
March 23	Queens Club	Young Giant	Alternative rock	Tooth & Nail	
March 23	Robbie Seay Band	Miracle		Sparrow	
March 23	Ron Contour & Factor Chandelier	Saffron	Hip-hop	Fake Four Inc.	
March 23	Rufus Wainwright	All Days Are Nights: Songs for Lulu	Pop	Decca, Polydor	
March 23	Sleeping with Sirens	With Ears to See and Eyes to Hear	Post-hardcore	Rise	
March 23	The Weakerthans	Live at the Burton Cummings Theatre	Indie rock	Anti-	
March 26	Alcest	Écailles de lune	Blackgaze, post-black metal	Prophecy Productions	
March 26	Madonna	Sticky & Sweet Tour		Warner Bros.	
March 26	Usher	Raymond v. Raymond	R&B	LaFace, Jive	
March 29	Craig David	Signed Sealed Delivered		Universal Motown	
March 29	Das Racist	Shut Up, Dude	Hip-hop	Greedhead Music, Mishka	
March 29	Hybrid	Disappear Here	Trip hop, breakbeat, electronica	Distinct'ive Breaks	
March 29	Lower Than Atlantis	Far Q	Melodic hardcore, post-hardcore, punk rock	A Wolf at Your Door	
March 30	Amy Grant	Somewhere Down the Road	Contemporary Christian	EMI CMG, Sparrow	
March 30	Black Francis	NonStopErotik	Alternative rock	Cooking Vinyl	
March 30	Charmaine	Love Reality	Christian electronic dance music	In:ciite Music	
March 30	Erykah Badu	New Amerykah Part Two (Return of the Ankh)	Neo soul	Universal Motown	
March 30	Manafest	The Chase	Christian rock, rap rock	BEC, Uprok Records	
March 30	Melissa Auf der Maur	Out of Our Minds	Alternative rock	Roadrunner	
March 30	Method Man, Ghostface Killah, and Raekwon	Wu-Massacre	Hip-hop	Def Jam	
March 30	Paper Tongues	Paper Tongues		A&M Octone	
March 30	Sho Baraka	Lions and Liars	Christian hip-hop	Reach	
March 31	Earl Sweatshirt	Earl	Alternative hip-hop, horrorcore	Earl Sweatshirt	
March 31	Jónsi	Go	Post-rock, baroque pop	XL, Parlophone	
March 31	Slash	Slash	Hard rock, heavy metal	EMI, Universal, Roadrunner	

== Second quarter ==
=== April ===
List of albums released in April 2010
Go to: January | February | March | April | May | June | July | August | September | October | November | December | Back to top
Release date	Artist	Album	Genre	Label	Ref.
April 1	Lali Puna	Our Inventions	Electropop	Morr	
April 3	Avantasia	Angel of Babylon	Power metal, symphonic metal	Nuclear Blast, Fearless, Bodog	
April 3	Avantasia	The Wicked Symphony	Power metal, symphonic metal	Nuclear Blast	
April 5	Darkthrone	Circle the Wagons	Crust punk, heavy metal, speed metal	Peaceville	
April 5	David Byrne & Fatboy Slim	Here Lies Love		Todomundo, Nonesuch	
April 5	GBH	Perfume and Piss	Hardcore punk, street punk, punk rock	Hellcat	
April 6	Bobby McFerrin	Vocabularies	Jazz	EmArcy	
April 6	Cary Brothers	Under Control	Indie rock	Procrastination Records	
April 6	The Classic Crime	Vagabonds	Alternative rock	Tooth & Nail	
April 6	Dave Barnes	What We Want, What We Get	CCM, pop, Christian rock	Razor & Tie	
April 6	Dr. Dog	Shame, Shame	Psychedelic rock, indie rock	Anti-	
April 6	Murder by Death	Good Morning, Magpie	Indie	Vagrant	
April 6	Secret and Whisper	Teenage Fantasy	Post-hardcore, emo, experimental	Tooth & Nail	
April 6	Sharon Jones & the Dap-Kings	I Learned the Hard Way	Soul, funk	Daptone	
April 6	Tunng	...And Then We Saw Land	Folktronica	Thrill Jockey, Full Time Hobby	
April 6	Upon a Burning Body	The World Is Ours	Deathcore	Sumerian	
April 6	Veil of Maya	Id	Deathcore, djent	Sumerian	
April 7	Engel	Threnody	Melodic death metal, industrial metal	Avex Group, Trooper Entertainment, Season of Mist	
April 9	Gyroscope	Cohesion	Alternative rock	Island	
April 9	Natalie Merchant	Leave Your Sleep	Folk	Nonesuch	
April 9	The Ocean	Heliocentic	Post-metal, post-rock, sludge metal	Pelagic, Metal Blade	
April 9	Plan B	The Defamation of Strickland Banks	Soul, hip-hop	679, Asylum	
April 12	Darwin Deez	Darwin Deez	Indie rock	Lucky Number Music	
April 13	Amber Pacific	Virtues	Pop-punk	Victory	
April 13	Bleeding Through	Bleeding Through	Metalcore	Rise, Roadrunner	
April 13	Cancer Bats	Bears, Mayors, Scraps & Bones	Hardcore punk, sludge metal	Distort	
April 13	Coheed and Cambria	Year of the Black Rainbow	Progressive rock	Columbia, Roadrunner	
April 13	Dosh	Tommy	Post-rock, instrumental hip-hop	Anticon	
April 13	The Flatliners	Cavalcade	Punk rock, alternative rock	Fat	
April 13	Foxy Shazam	Foxy Shazam	Glam rock	Sire	
April 13	Matt Pond PA	The Dark Leaves	Indie rock	Altitude Records	
April 13	Murs and 9th Wonder	Fornever	Hip-hop	SMC	
April 13	The Nels Cline Singers	Initiate	Rock, jazz	Cryptogramophone	
April 13	The Tallest Man on Earth	The Wild Hunt	Folk	Dead Oceans	
April 13	War of Ages	Eternal	Metalcore	Facedown	
April 14	Saori@destiny	World Wild 2010	J-pop, electropop, electro	D-topia, Victor	
April 16	Eisbrecher	Eiszeit	Neue Deutsche Härte	AFM, Metropolis	
April 16	Terje Rypdal	Crime Scene	Jazz	ECM	
April 17	Josh Ritter	So Runs the World Away	Folk rock, Americana	Pytheas Recordings	
April 19	Eivind Aarset & the Sonic Codex Orchestra	Live Extracts	Jazz	Jazzland	
April 19	John Grant	Queen of Denmark	Indie folk, soft rock	Bella Union	
April 19	Kate Nash	My Best Friend Is You	Indie pop, indie rock	Geffen, Fiction	
April 19	Lucky Soul	A Coming of Age	Indie pop	Ruffa Lane Rrecords	
April 19	Meat Loaf	Hang Cool Teddy Bear	Hard rock	Mercury, Loud & Proud	
April 19	Paul Weller	Wake Up the Nation	Rock, indie rock	Island, Yep Roc	
April 20	The Apples in Stereo	Travellers in Space and Time	Indie pop	Simian, Elephant 6, Yep Roc	
April 20	Caribou	Swim		City Slang, Merge	
April 20	Circa Survive	Blue Sky Noise	Indie rock	Atlantic	
April 20	Cypress Hill	Rise Up	Hip-hop, rap rock	Priority	
April 20	Kayo Dot	Coyote	Experimental music	Hydra Head	
April 20	Kottonmouth Kings	Long Live the Kings	Rap rock	Suburban Noize	
April 20	Little Brother	Leftback	Hip-hop, alternative hip-hop	Hall of Justus, Traffic Entertainment Group	
April 20	Ozomatli	Fire Away	Funk, hip-hop	Downtown, Mercer Street Records	
April 20	Periphery	Periphery	Progressive metal, djent, progressive metalcore	Sumerian, Distort, Roadrunner	
April 20	Ratt	Infestation	Heavy metal, hard rock	Loud & Proud, Roadrunner	
April 20	Sevendust	Cold Day Memory	Alternative metal	Asylum	
April 20	Sick of It All	Based on a True Story	Hardcore punk, crossover thrash	Century Media	
April 20	Superchick	Reinvention	Christian rock	Inpop	
April 20	Willie Nelson	Country Music	Country, bluegrass	Rounder	
April 23	Hole	Nobody's Daughter	Alternative rock	Mercury	
April 26	Bullet for My Valentine	Fever	Heavy metal, melodic metalcore	Sony Music, Jive	
April 26	The Fall	Your Future Our Clutter	Post-punk	Domino	
April 26	The Futureheads	The Chaos	Punk rock, indie rock	Nul	
April 27	Balkan Beat Box	Blue Eyed Black Boy		Nat Geo Music, Crammed Discs	
April 27	B.o.B	B.o.B Presents: The Adventures of Bobby Ray	Alternative hip-hop, rap rock, Pop rock	Grand Hustle, Rebel Rock, Atlantic	
April 27	Daddy Yankee	Mundial	Reggaeton	El Cartel, Sony Latin	
April 27	Drowning Pool	Drowning Pool	Hard rock, post-grunge, alternative metal	Eleven Seven	
April 27	Gogol Bordello	Trans-Continental Hustle	Gypsy punk	American Recordings	
April 27	Jo Dee Messina	Unmistakable: Love	Country	Curb	
April 27	Melissa Etheridge	Fearless Love	Rock	Island	
April 27	Raintime	Psychromatic	Power metal, progressive metal	Lifeforce	
April 30	CocoRosie	Grey Oceans	Freak folk, art pop	Sub Pop	
April 30	Diana Vickers	Songs from the Tainted Cherry Tree	Dance-pop, folktronica, electropop	RCA	

=== May ===
List of albums released in May 2010
Go to: January | February | March | April | May | June | July | August | September | October | November | December | Back to top
Release date	Artist	Album	Genre	Label	Ref.
May 1	Homens da Luta	A Cantiga É Uma Arma		Casa do Fumo	
May 3	Flying Lotus	Cosmogramma	Electronica	Warp	
May 4	Big K.R.I.T.	K.R.I.T. Wuz Here	Southern hip-hop	Cinematic, Nature Sounds	
May 4	Broken Social Scene	Forgiveness Rock Record	Indie rock	Arts & Crafts	
May 4	Court Yard Hounds	Court Yard Hounds	Country rock	Columbia	
May 4	Deftones	Diamond Eyes	Alternative metal	Reprise	
May 4	f(x)	Nu ABO	Pop	SM	
May 4	Godsmack	The Oracle	Heavy metal, hard rock	Universal Republic	
May 4	The Hold Steady	Heaven Is Whenever	Indie rock	Vagrant, Rough Trade	
May 4	The Letter Black	Hanging On by a Thread	Christian rock	Tooth & Nail	
May 4	MercyMe	The Generous Mr. Lovewell	Christian rock	INO	
May 4	Minus the Bear	Omni	Math rock, experimental rock, progressive rock	Dangerbird	
May 4	The New Pornographers	Together	Indie rock, power pop	Last Gang, Matador	
May 4	Nonpoint	Miracle	Alternative metal	954 Records	
May 4	Roc Marciano	Marcberg	Hip-hop	Fat Beats Records	
May 4	Toni Braxton	Pulse	R&B	Atlantic	
May 4	Tonic	Tonic	Rock	429	
May 4	Woods	At Echo Lake	Indie rock, freak folk	Woodsist	
May 7	As I Lay Dying	The Powerless Rise	Metalcore	Metal Blade	
May 7	Charice	Charice		Reprise	
May 7	Exodus	Exhibit B: The Human Condition	Thrash metal	Nuclear Blast	
May 7	Lena	My Cassette Player		Universal Music Germany	
May 10	Foals	Total Life Forever	Indie rock	Transgressive, Sub Pop	
May 10	Keane	Night Train	Alternative rock	Island, Cherrytree, Interscope	
May 10	The National	High Violet	Indie rock, post-punk revival	4AD	
May 10	We Are the Fallen	Tear the World Down	Hard rock, nu metal	Universal Republic	
May 10	Zaz	Zaz	Pop, jazz, blues	Play On, Sony Music	
May 11	Beneath the Sky	In Loving Memory	Metalcore, deathcore	Victory	
May 11	The Dead Weather	Sea of Cowards	Rock	Warner Bros., Third Man	
May 11	Gayngs	Relayted	Indie rock, soft rock	Jagjaguwar	
May 11	Holy Fuck	Latin	Electronic	Young Turks	
May 11	Lost Dogs	Old Angel	Blues rock, roots music	Fools of the World, Stunt	
May 11	Male Bonding	Nothing Hurts	Indie rock, noise pop, punk rock	Sub Pop	
May 11	Open Mike Eagle	Unapologetic Art Rap	Hip-hop	Mush	
May 11	Sage Francis	Life	Hip-hop	Anti-	
May 11	Tenth Avenue North	The Light Meets the Dark	Contemporary Christian	Reunion	
May 13	Super Junior	Bonamana	K-pop, R&B, dance	SM	
May 14	Cloud Control	Bliss Release	Folk, psychedelic	Ivy League	
May 14	Kelis	Flesh Tone	EDM, dance-pop, electropop	will.i.am, Interscope	
May 16	Faithless	The Dance	Trip hop, trance, dance	Nates Tunes, PIAS	
May 17	LCD Soundsystem	This Is Happening	Dance-punk, electronica, art rock	DFA, Virgin	
May 17	Tracey Thorn	Love and Its Opposite	Chamber folk	Strange Feeling, Merge	
May 17	Wintersleep	New Inheritors	Indie rock	The Tom Kotter Company	
May 18	Bad Religion	30 Years Live	Punk rock	Epitaph	
May 18	Band of Horses	Infinite Arms	Indie rock	Brown, Fat Possum, Columbia	
May 18	The Black Keys	Brothers	Blues rock, garage rock	Nonesuch	
May 18	Factor Chandelier	Lawson Graham	Hip-hop	Fake Four Inc.	
May 18	Guilty Simpson	O. J. Simpson	Hip-hop	Stones Throw	
May 18	Hammock	Chasing After Shadows... Living with the Ghosts	Ambient, post-rock	Hammock Music	
May 18	Jamie Lidell	Compass	Soul	Warp	
May 18	Janelle Monáe	The ArchAndroid	Alternative R&B, psychedelic pop, psychedelic soul	Wondaland Arts Society, Bad Boy, Atlantic	
May 18	Jay Chou	The Era	Mandopop	JVR Music	
May 18	Jimmy Needham	Nightlights	Contemporary Christian	Inpop	
May 18	Mickie James	Strangers & Angels	Country		
May 18	Necro	Die!	Horrorcore	Psycho+Logical	
May 18	Ryan Adams	Orion	Hard rock, heavy metal	PAX AM	
May 18	Silent Civilian	Ghost Stories	Metalcore, thrash metal	Mediaskare	
May 18	Soulfly	Omen	Thrash metal, groove metal, death metal	Roadrunner	
May 18	To Speak of Wolves	Myself < Letting Go	Metalcore, post-hardcore	Solid State	
May 19	22-20s	Shake/Shiver/Moan	Rock, blues	Yoshimoto R and C, TBD	
May 21	Apparatjik	4 Can Keep a Secret If 3 of Them Are Dead			
May 21	Pendulum	Immersion	Electronic rock	Warner Music UK, Earstorm, Atlantic	
May 21	Stone Temple Pilots	Stone Temple Pilots	Alternative rock, hard rock	Atlantic	
May 21	Tame Impala	Innerspeaker	Psychedelic rock, neo-psychedelia	Modular	
May 24	Katie Melua	The House	Pop, jazz, progressive rock	Dramatico	
May 24	Rolo Tomassi	Cosmology	Mathcore	Hassle	
May 24	Sleigh Bells	Treats	Noise pop	Mom + Pop, N.E.E.T.	
May 24	Stornoway	Beachcomber's Windowsill	Indie rock, indie folk, chamber pop	4AD	
May 24	Villagers	Becoming a Jackal		Domino	
May 25	Bettye LaVette	Interpretations: The British Rock Songbook	Soul, R&B	Anti-	
May 25	Black Tusk	Taste the Sin	Sludge metal	Relapse	
May 25	Framing Hanley	A Promise to Burn		Silent Majority, Warner	
May 25	Shad	TSOL	Hip-hop	Black Box, Decon	
May 25	Tobacco	Maniac Meat	Electronic	Anticon	
May 29	The Brave Little Abacus	Just Got Back From the Discomfort—We're Alright	Emo, emo revival, math rock	The Brave Little Abacus	
May 31	The Divine Comedy	Bang Goes the Knighthood	Orchestral pop, art pop	Divine Comedy	

=== June ===
List of albums released in June 2010
Go to: January | February | March | April | May | June | July | August | September | October | November | December | Back to top
Release date	Artist	Album	Genre	Label	Ref.
June 1	Clay Aiken	Tried and True	Pop	Decca	
June 1	Hawthorne Heights	Skeletons	Post-hardcore, emo, alternative rock	Wind-up	
June 1	Jack Johnson	To the Sea	Folk rock, soft rock	Brushfire, Universal Republic	
June 1	Melvins	The Bride Screamed Murder	Sludge metal	Ipecac	
June 4	Christina Aguilera	Bionic	Electropop, futurepop, R&B	RCA	
June 7	The Drums	The Drums	Indie rock	Moshi Moshi, Island	
June 7	Morcheeba	Blood Like Lemonade	Electronica	PIAS	
June 7	Nina Nastasia	Outlaster	Folk, post-classical	FatCat	
June 8	Actress	Splazsh	Electronic, outsider house	Honest Jon's	
June 8	Against Me!	White Crosses	Punk rock, power pop, arena rock	Sire	
June 8	Ariel Pink	Before Today		4AD	
June 8	Attack Attack!	Attack Attack!	Metalcore	Rise	
June 8	Blitzen Trapper	Destroyer of the Void	Alternative country	Sub Pop	
June 8	Deer Tick	The Black Dirt Sessions	Indie rock, alternative country	Partisan	
June 8	Dierks Bentley	Up on the Ridge	Country	Capitol Nashville	
June 8	Hot Hot Heat	Future Breeds	Indie rock, alternative rock, new wave	Dangerbird, Dine Alone	
June 8	MyChildren MyBride	Lost Boy	Metalcore	Solid State	
June 8	Nevermore	The Obsidian Conspiracy	Progressive metal, thrash metal	Century Media	
June 8	Rhymefest	El Che	Hip-hop	dNBe Entertainment, EMI	
June 8	Tokyo Police Club	Champ	Indie rock, alternative rock, heartland rock	Mom + Pop Music	
June 8	Travie McCoy	Lazarus		Nappy Boy, Decaydance, Fueled by Ramen	
June 8	Whitechapel	A New Era of Corruption	Deathcore	Victory	
June 8	The Young Veins	Take a Vacation!	Rock, garage rock, psychedelic rock	One Haven Music	
June 11	Kevin Rudolf	To the Sky	Pop rock, rap rock	Cash Money	
June 11	Monrose	Ladylike		Starwatch Music, Cheyenne, Warner Music	
June 11	Ozzy Osbourne	Scream	Heavy metal	Epic	
June 14	The Chemical Brothers	Further	Electronic	Freestyle Dust, Parlophone	
June 14	Ed Harcourt	Lustre	British rock, chamber pop	Piano Wolf Recordings	
June 14	Uffie	Sex Dreams and Denim Jeans	Synth-pop, electronica, hip-hop	Ed Banger, Because Music	
June 14	We Are Scientists	Barbara	Indie rock, post-punk revival	PIAS	
June 15	Cowboy Junkies	Renmin Park	Alternative country	Latent	
June 15	Devo	Something for Everybody	New wave	Warner Bros.	
June 15	Dirty Circus	Alive and Well	Hip-hop	URBNET	
June 15	Drake	Thank Me Later	Hip-hop, R&B, pop-rap	Young Money, Cash Money, Universal Motown	
June 15	Gaslight Anthem	American Slang	Heartland rock, punk rock, power pop	SideOneDummy	
June 15	Pigeon Hole	Age Like Astronauts		URBNET	
June 15	Punch Brothers	Antifogmatic	Progressive bluegrass	Nonesuch	
June 15	Tom Petty and the Heartbreakers	Mojo	Heartland rock, blues rock	Reprise	
June 15	Ty Segall	Melted	Garage rock, psychedelic rock	Goner	
June 18	The Amity Affliction	Youngbloods	Post-hardcore	Boomtown	
June 18	Eminem	Recovery	Hip-hop	Aftermath, Shady, Interscope	
June 18	Miley Cyrus	Can't Be Tamed	Dance-pop	Hollywood	
June 18	Sia	We Are Born	Pop	Monkey Puzzle, Jive	
June 21	Pulled Apart by Horses	Pulled Apart by Horses	Alternative rock, stoner rock, post-hardcore	Transgressive	
June 21	Vinnie Paz	Season of the Assassin	Hip-hop	Enemy Soil Entertainment, The Orchard	
June 21	Pierce the Veil	Selfish Machines	Post-hardcore, pop-punk, experimental rock	Equal Vision	
June 22	Baths	Cerulean	Hypnagogic pop, glitch, experimental pop	Anticon	
June 22	Cyndi Lauper	Memphis Blues	Blues	Downtown	
June 22	Front Line Assembly	Improvised Electronic Device	Electro-industrial, industrial metal, industrial rock	Metropolis, Dependent	
June 22	Herbie Hancock	The Imagine Project	Jazz		
June 22	Laurie Anderson	Homeland	Avant-garde, experimental, pop	Nonesuch	
June 22	Oneohtrix Point Never	Returnal	Ambient, noise, kosmische	Mego	
June 22	The Roots	How I Got Over	Hip-hop	Def Jam	
June 22	VersaEmerge	Fixed at Zero	Alternative rock, experimental rock	Fueled by Ramen	
June 22	Yakuza	Of Seismic Consequence		Profound Lore	
June 25	The Cat Empire	Cinema	Alternative rock, jazz, ska	EMI	
June 27	Ceschi	The One Man Band Broke Up	Hip-hop	Fake Four Inc., Equinox Records	
June 27	Pet Slimmers of the Year	...And the Sky Fell	Post-metal, post-rock	Lost Children Net Label	
June 28	Kula Shaker	Pilgrims Progress	Rock	Strange F.O.L.K. Records	
June 28	Scissor Sisters	Night Work	Glam rock	Polydor	
June 29	3OH!3	Streets of Gold	Electropop, electronic rock	Photo Finish, Atlantic	
June 29	The-Dream	Love King	R&B	Radio Killa, Def Jam	
June 29	Haste the Day	Attack of the Wolf King	Metalcore	Solid State	
June 29	Maps & Atlases	Perch Patchwork	Indie rock	Barsuk	
June 29	Wolf Parade	Expo 86	Indie rock	Sub Pop	
June 30	Kylie Minogue	Aphrodite	Dance-pop, disco-pop	Parlophone	

== Third quarter ==
=== July ===
List of albums released in July 2010
Go to: January | February | March | April | May | June | July | August | September | October | November | December | Back to top
Release date	Artist	Album	Genre	Label	Ref.
July 1	Wavves	King of the Beach	Indie rock, psychedelic pop, pop-punk	Fat Possum	
July 2	Soilwork	The Panic Broadcast	Melodic death metal	Nuclear Blast	
July 3	Liz Phair	Funstyle	Pop rock, electropop, pop rap	Rocket Science Records	
July 5	Big Boi	Sir Lucious Left Foot: The Son of Chico Dusty	Hip-hop	Purple Ribbon, Def Jam South	
July 5	Cherry Ghost	Beneath This Burning Shoreline	Indie rock, chamber pop	Heavenly	
July 5	Enrique Iglesias	Euphoria	Latin pop	Universal Republic, Universal Music Latino	
July 5	I Am Kloot	Sky at Night		Shepherd Moon LLP	
July 5	Mystery Jets	Serotonin	Indie rock	Rough Trade	
July 6	Brandon Boyd	The Wild Trapeze	Alternative rock	Epic	
July 6	Juvenile	Beast Mode	Hip-hop	UTP Records, E1	
July 6	The Tony Danza Tapdance Extravaganza	Danza III: The Series of Unfortunate Events	Mathcore, djent	Black Market Activities	
July 6	Trailer Choir	Tailgate	Country	Show Dog-Universal Music	
July 7	M.I.A.	Maya	Avant-pop, hip-hop, industrial	N.E.E.T., XL, Interscope	
July 9	In This Moment	A Star-Crossed Wasteland	Metalcore, heavy metal, hard rock	Century Media	
July 11	Crowded House	Intriguer	Alternative rock	Fantasy	
July 12	Andrea Bocelli	Carmen: Duets & Arias	Opera, classical	Decca, Universal	
July 12	Danger Mouse and Sparklehorse	Dark Night of the Soul	Indie rock	Parlophone, Capitol, Lex	
July 12	El Guincho	Piratas de Sudamérica, Vol. 1		Young Turks	
July 12	The Maine	Black & White	Pop rock	Warner Bros.	
July 12	Young Guns	All Our Kings Are Dead	Alternative rock	Live Forever	
July 13	Capone-N-Noreaga	The War Report 2: Report the War	East Coast hip-hop, hardcore hip-hop, gangsta rap	Ice H2O, EMI	
July 13	Hellyeah	Stampede	Groove metal	Epic	
July 13	Korn	Korn III: Remember Who You Are	Nu metal	Roadrunner	
July 13	Mack 10 & Glasses Malone	Money Music			
July 13	Norma Jean	Meridional	Metalcore, mathcore, sludge metal	Razor & Tie	
July 13	Paul Wall	Heart of a Champion	Hip-hop	Asylum, Swishahouse	
July 13	Stat Quo	Statlanta	Hip-hop	Dream Big, Sony Music, The Orchard	
July 13	Sun Kil Moon	Admiral Fell Promises	Folk rock	Caldo Verde	
July 15	Pernice Brothers	Goodbye, Killer	Indie rock	Ashmont Records	
July 19	Loudon Wainwright III	10 Songs for the New Depression	Folk, pop rock	Proper	
July 19	Mount Kimbie	Crooks & Lovers	Post-dubstep	Hotflush	
July 20	The Acacia Strain	Wormwood	Deathcore, metalcore	Prosthetic	
July 20	Big Head Todd and the Monsters	Rocksteady	Rock	Big Records	
July 20	Billy Bang	Prayer for Peace	Jazz	Tum Records	
July 20	Black Veil Brides	We Stitch These Wounds	Post-hardcore, metalcore	StandBy, Virgin	
July 20	Frontier Ruckus	Deadmalls and Nightfalls	Folk rock	Ramseur Records	
July 20	Rick Ross	Teflon Don	Hip-hop	Maybach Music Group, Slip-n-Slide, Def Jam	
July 20	Sheryl Crow	100 Miles from Memphis	R&B, Memphis soul	A&M	
July 23	Avenged Sevenfold	Nightmare	Heavy metal	Warner Bros.	
July 27	Best Coast	Crazy for You	Indie pop, surf, garage rock	Mexican Summer	
July 27	Dean & Britta	13 Most Beautiful: Songs for Andy Warhol's Screen Tests		Double Feature Records	
July 27	Decrepit Birth	Polarity	Technical death metal	Nuclear Blast	
July 27	Dru Hill	InDRUpendence Day	R&B, soul	Kedar Entertainment Group	
July 27	Miniature Tigers	Fortress	Indie rock, alternative rock	Modern Art Records	
July 29	Blind Guardian	At the Edge of Time	Power metal, progressive metal, symphonic metal	Nuclear Blast	
July 29	Tom Jones	Praise & Blame	Americana	Island, Lost Highway	
July 30	Bliss n Eso	Running on Air	Hip-hop	Illusive Sounds, Liberation Music	

=== August ===
List of albums released in August 2010
Go to: January | February | March | April | May | June | July | August | September | October | November | December | Back to top
Release date	Artist	Album	Genre	Label	Ref.
August 2	Opshop	Until the End of Time	Rock	Rhythmethod	
August 3	Arcade Fire	The Suburbs	Indie rock, art rock, baroque pop	Merge, City Slang, Mercury	
August 3	Buckcherry	All Night Long	Hard rock	Eleven Seven Music, Atlantic	
August 3	Dr. John and the Lower 911	Tribal	Blues	429	
August 3	Les Savy Fav	Root for Ruin	Art punk, indie rock, post-punk	Frenchkiss	
August 3	Secondhand Serenade	Hear Me Now	Alternative rock, pop rock, emo pop	Glassnote	
August 10	Black Label Society	Order of the Black	Heavy metal	E1 Music, Roadrunner, Riot	
August 10	Brother Clyde	Brother Clyde	Alternative rock	Fontana, Buena Vista	
August 10	The Budos Band	The Budos Band III	Afrobeat, funk, soul	Daptone	
August 10	Chuck Person	Chuck Person's Eccojams Vol. 1		The Curatorial Club	
August 10	Mike Posner	31 Minutes to Takeoff	Electropop	J	
August 11	Angra	Aqua	Progressive metal, power metal		
August 12	Wang Leehom	The 18 Martial Arts	Mandopop	Sony Music Taiwan	
August 13	Iron Maiden	The Final Frontier	Heavy metal	EMI	
August 13	Jolin Tsai	Myself	Pop	Warner, Mars	
August 13	Mac Miller	K.I.D.S.		Rostrum	
August 13	The Saturdays	Headlines!	Electropop, pop	Fascination, Geffen	
August 16	Darin	Lovekiller		Universal Music	
August 16	David Gray	Foundling	Folk rock	Polydor, Downtown, Mercer Street Records	
August 16	The Hoosiers	The Illusion of Safety	Pop rock, indie pop, indie rock	RCA	
August 17	American Hi-Fi	Fight the Frequency	Power pop, alternative rock	RED	
August 17	Brian Wilson	Brian Wilson Reimagines Gershwin	Traditional pop	Walt Disney	
August 17	Eels	Tomorrow Morning	Rock	E Works, Vagrant	
August 17	John Mellencamp	No Better Than This	Americana, country blues, heartland rock	Rounder	
August 17	Matthew Dear	Black City	Electronic	Ghostly International	
August 17	Miss May I	Monument	Metalcore	Rise	
August 17	Ray LaMontagne and the Pariah Dogs	God Willin' & the Creek Don't Rise	Folk, folk rock	RCA, Stone Dwarf, RED	
August 17	Trace Adkins	Cowboy's Back in Town	Country	Show Dog-Universal Music	
August 20	Accept	Blood of the Nations	Heavy metal	Nuclear Blast	
August 20	Apocalyptica	7th Symphony	Hard rock		
August 20	Grass Widow	Past Time		Kill Rock Stars	
August 23	Klaxons	Surfing the Void	Indie rock, electronic rock, noise rock	Polydor	
August 23	Women	Public Strain	Post-punk	Flemish Eye, Jagjaguwar	
August 23	Zola Jesus	Stridulum II		Souterrain Transmissions	
August 24	Fantasia	Back to Me	R&B, pop	J	
August 24	Ion Dissonance	Cursed	Deathcore, mathcore	Century Media	
August 24	Isobel Campbell	Hawk	Alternative rock, folk rock	V2	
August 24	Jessica Mauboy	Get 'Em Girls	R&B	SRC, Universal Republic	
August 24	Katy Perry	Teenage Dream	Pop	Capitol	
August 24	Little Big Town	The Reason Why	Country	Capitol Nashville	
August 24	Malevolent Creation	Invidious Dominion	Death metal	Nuclear Blast	
August 24	Never Shout Never	Harmony	Folk, folk pop	Loveway Records, Sire, Warner Bros.	
August 27	Everything Everything	Man Alive	Art rock, indie rock	Geffen	
August 27	Hurts	Happiness		Major Label, RCA	
August 27	The Pretty Reckless	Light Me Up	Alternative rock	Interscope	
August 28	Goo Goo Dolls	Something for the Rest of Us	Alternative rock, soft rock	Warner Bros.	
August 30	Kano	Method to the Maadness	British hip-hop, electronic	Bigger Picture Music	
August 31	Atom Smash	Love Is in the Missile		Jive	
August 31	The Autumn Offering	The Autumn Offering	Melodic death metal, deathcore	Victory	
August 31	Bill Frisell	Beautiful Dreamers	Jazz	Savoy	
August 31	Comeback Kid	Symptoms + Cures	Hardcore punk	Victory	
August 31	Disturbed	Asylum	Heavy metal, alternative metal, hard rock	Reprise	
August 31	Film School	Fission		Beggars Banquet	
August 31	For Today	Breaker	Metalcore	Facedown	
August 31	Jenny & Johnny	I'm Having Fun Now	Alternative	Warner	
August 31	KRS-One and True Master	Meta-Historical	Hip-hop	Fat Beats Records	
August 31	Luke Doucet	Steel City Trawler	Indie rock, country	Six Shooter	
August 31	Murderdolls	Women and Children Last	Heavy metal, horror punk	Roadrunner	
August 31	Papa Roach	Time for Annihilation: On the Record & On the Road		Eleven Seven Music	
August 31	The Weepies	Be My Thrill	Folk-pop	Nettwerk	
August 31	Within the Ruins	Invade	Progressive metal, metalcore, mathcore	Victory	
August 31	The Word Alive	Deceiver	Metalcore	Fearless	

=== September ===
List of albums released in September 2010
Go to: January | February | March | April | May | June | July | August | September | October | November | December | Back to top
Release date	Artist	Album	Genre	Label	Ref.
September 1	Tarja	What Lies Beneath	Symphonic metal	Vertigo, Universal, The End	
September 2	Underworld	Barking	Techno	Cooking Vinyl	
September 3	Brandon Flowers	Flamingo	Soft rock, country pop, synth-pop	Island	
September 3	Death Angel	Relentless Retribution	Thrash metal	Nuclear Blast	
September 3	Imelda May	Mayhem	Rockabilly	Decca	
September 3	Oceansize	Self Preserved While the Bodies Float Up	Progressive rock	Superball Music	
September 6	The Naked and Famous	Passive Me, Aggressive You	Synth-pop, electro rock	Somewhat Damaged	
September 6	Robyn	Body Talk Pt. 2	Synth-pop, dance-pop	Konichiwa	
September 7	Anberlin	Dark Is the Way, Light Is a Place	Alternative rock	Universal Republic	
September 7	Atmosphere	To All My Friends, Blood Makes the Blade Holy: The Atmosphere EP's	Hip-hop	Rhymesayers	
September 7	Blue Sky Black Death and Alexander Chen	Third Party	Hip-hop	Fake Four Inc.	
September 7	Gold Panda	Lucky Shiner	Electronic	Ghostly International	
September 7	Helmet	Seeing Eye Dog	Alternative metal	Work Song	
September 7	Interpol	Interpol	Indie rock, post-punk revival	Matador, Soft Limit	
September 7	JoJo	Can't Take That Away from Me	R&B, pop		
September 7	Sara Bareilles	Kaleidoscope Heart	Pop rock, soul	Epic	
September 7	Stone Sour	Audio Secrecy	Alternative metal, post-grunge, alternative rock	Roadrunner	
September 7	Tera Melos	Patagonian Rats		Sargent House	
September 7	The Thermals	Personal Life	Indie rock	Kill Rock Stars	
September 8	Linkin Park	A Thousand Suns	Alternative rock	Warner Bros., Machine Shop	
September 8	Röyksopp	Senior	Downtempo, ambient, trip hop	Wall of Sound	
September 10	Kamelot	Poetry for the Poisoned	Progressive metal, heavy metal, power metal	Avalon, earMUSIC, KMG Recordings	
September 10	The Script	Science & Faith	Alternative rock	RCA	
September 10	Weezer	Hurley	Alternative rock, power pop	Epitaph	
September 13	DragonForce	Twilight Dementia	Power metal	Roadrunner, Spinefarm	
September 13	Edwyn Collins	Losing Sleep		Heavenly	
September 13	Grinderman	Grinderman 2	Alternative rock, noise rock	Mute	
September 13	El Guincho	Pop Negro	Tropicália, psychedelic pop	Young Turks	
September 13	Junip	Fields	Indie rock, pop	Mute	
September 13	Phil Collins	Going Back	Pop, soul, R&B	Atlantic	
September 13	Skunk Anansie	Wonderlustre	Alternative rock, post-grunge	V2, earMUSIC, Carosello	
September 14	Amusement Parks on Fire	Road Eyes			
September 14	Azure Ray	Drawing Down the Moon	Dream pop	Saddle Creek	
September 14	The Bad Plus	Never Stop	Jazz	E1 Music	
September 14	Bilal	Airtight's Revenge	Neo soul	Plug Research	
September 14	Black Milk	Album of the Year	Hip-hop	Fat Beats Records	
September 14	Das Racist	Sit Down, Man	Hip-hop	Greedhead Music, Mishka NYC, Mad Decent	
September 14	Dibiase	Machines Hate Me	Instrumental hip-hop	Alpha Pup	
September 14	Jamey Johnson	The Guitar Song	Country	Mercury Nashville	
September 14	Justin Townes Earle	Harlem River Blues	Country	Bloodshot	
September 14	Kendrick Lamar	Overly Dedicated	Hip-hop	Top Dawg	
September 14	of Montreal	False Priest	Psychedelic pop, dance pop, R&B	Polyvinyl	
September 14	Mavis Staples	You Are Not Alone		Anti-	
September 14	Screaming Females	Castle Talk	Indie rock, punk rock	Don Giovanni	
September 14	Sully Erna	Avalon	Acoustic rock, symphonic rock	Universal Republic	
September 14	Superchunk	Majesty Shredding	Alternative rock, indie rock, punk rock	Merge	
September 14	Trey Songz	Passion, Pain & Pleasure	R&B	Songbook, Atlantic	
September 14	The Walkmen	Lisbon	Indie rock	Fat Possum, Bella Union	
September 15	Maroon 5	Hands All Over	Pop	A&M Octone	
September 17	Selena Gomez & the Scene	A Year Without Rain	Dance-pop, synth-pop	Hollywood	
September 20	Abe Vigoda	Crush		Bella Union, PPM	
September 20	Black Country Communion	Black Country Communion	Hard rock, blues rock	Mascot, J&R Adventures	
September 20	Manic Street Preachers	Postcards from a Young Man	Alternative rock, power pop	Columbia	
September 20	Orchestral Manoeuvres in the Dark	History of Modern	Synth-pop	100% Records	
September 21	Emm Gryner	Gem and I	Pop	Dead Daisy Records, Second Motion	
September 21	John Legend and The Roots	Wake Up!	R&B, soul, funk	GOOD Music, Columbia	
September 21	Matt Costa	Mobile Chateau	Indie rock	Brushfire	
September 21	My Darkest Days	My Darkest Days	Hard rock, post-grunge	604	
September 21	Paula Cole	Ithaca	Rock	Decca	
September 21	Serj Tankian	Imperfect Harmonies	Art rock, symphonic rock, progressive rock	Reprise, Serjical Strike	
September 21	Sharon Van Etten	Epic		Ba Da Bing	
September 21	Torche	Songs for Singles	Sludge metal	Hydra Head	
September 22	Dimmu Borgir	Abrahadabra	Symphonic black metal	Nuclear Blast	
September 22	Envy	Recitation	Screamo, post-rock	Temporary Residence Limited	
September 22	KT Tunstall	Tiger Suit	Folktronica, indie pop	Relentless	
September 23	Swans	My Father Will Guide Me up a Rope to the Sky	Post-rock	Young God	
September 23	White Denim	Last Day of Summer	Indie rock, psychedelic rock	Downtown	
September 24	Ana Popović	An evening at Trasimeno Lake	Electric blues, blues rock, jazz	ArtisteXclusive records	
September 24	Gordon Haskell	One Day Soon		Fullfill Records	
September 24	Mark Ronson & The Business Intl.	Record Collection	Alternative hip-hop, synth-pop, alternative dance	Allido, RCA, Columbia	
September 27	Deerhunter	Halcyon Digest	Psychedelic pop, dream pop, indie pop	4AD	
September 27	Enslaved	Axioma Ethica Odini	Progressive metal, Viking metal	Indie Recordings, Nuclear Blast	
September 27	Infernal	Fall from Grace		Border Breakers, inf:rec	
September 27	Killing Joke	Absolute Dissent	Industrial metal, post-punk	Spinefarm, Universal	
September 27	Lil Wayne	I Am Not a Human Being	Hip-hop	Young Money, Cash Money, Universal Motown	
September 27	Momus	Hypnoprism		Analog Baroque	
September 27	Tricky	Mixed Race	Trip hop, electronica	Domino	
September 27	The Twilight Sad	The Wrong Car	Indie rock	FatCat	
September 28	Aloe Blacc	Good Things	Soul	Stones Throw, Vertigo	
September 28	August Burns Red	Home	Melodic metalcore	Solid State	
September 28	Bad Religion	The Dissent of Man	Punk rock	Epitaph	
September 28	Ben Folds and Nick Hornby	Lonely Avenue	Alternative rock	Nonesuch	
September 28	Electric Six	Zodiac	Indie rock, electronic rock	Metropolis	
September 28	Ice Cube	I Am the West	West Coast hip-hop	Lench Mob	
September 28	Jimmy Eat World	Invented	Power pop	Interscope	
September 28	Kenny Chesney	Hemingway's Whiskey	Country	BNA	
September 28	Michael W. Smith	Wonder	CCM, pop	Reunion	
September 28	Mushroomhead	Beautiful Stories for Ugly Children	Alternative metal	Megaforce	
September 28	No Age	Everything in Between	Art punk, noise rock, experimental rock	Sub Pop	
September 28	October Tide	A Thin Shell	Death-doom	Candlelight	
September 28	Owen Pallett	A Swedish Love Story	Baroque pop	Domino	
September 28	Ronnie Wood	I Feel Like Playing	Blues rock, boogie rock	Eagle Rock	
September 30	Grimes	Halfaxa	Witch house	Arbutus, Lo	

== Fourth quarter ==
=== October ===
List of albums released in October 2010
Go to: January | February | March | April | May | June | July | August | September | October | November | December | Back to top
Release date	Artist	Album	Genre	Label	Ref.
October 1	Tinie Tempah	Disc-Overy	Hip-hop	Parlophone	
October 4	Bring Me the Horizon	There Is a Hell Believe Me I've Seen It. There Is a Heaven Let's Keep It a Secret.	Metalcore	Epitaph	
October 4	Bruno Mars	Doo-Wops & Hooligans	R&B, pop	Atlantic, Elektra	
October 4	Crystal Fighters	Star of Love	Folktronica, alternative dance	Zirkulo	
October 4	Gonjasufi	The Caliph's Tea Party	Alternative hip-hop	Warp	
October 5	Air Dubai	Wonder Age	Alternative rock		
October 5	Canibus	C of Tranquility	Hip-hop	Interdependent Media	
October 5	Chiodos	Illuminaudio	Post-hardcore	Equal Vision	
October 5	The Corin Tucker Band	1,000 Years	Alternative rock, indie rock	Kill Rock Stars	
October 5	David Archuleta	The Other Side of Down	Pop	Jive, 19	
October 5	Emily Osment	Fight or Flight	Electropop	Wind-up	
October 5	Faith Evans	Something About Faith	R&B	Prolific, E1	
October 5	Finger Eleven	Life Turns Electric	Alternative rock	Wind-up	
October 5	Fistful of Mercy	As I Call You Down	Blues, folk rock	HOT Records	
October 5	Guster	Easy Wonderful	Alternative rock, indie rock	Aware, Universal Republic	
October 5	Joe Satriani	Black Swans and Wormhole Wizards	Instrumental rock, progressive rock	Epic	
October 5	Marnie Stern	Marnie Stern	Experimental rock, indie rock	Kill Rock Stars	
October 5	Toby Keith	Bullets in the Gun	Country	Show Dog-Universal Music	
October 8	Alter Bridge	AB III	Alternative metal	Roadrunner	
October 8	The Audreys	Sometimes the Stars		ABC Music	
October 8	Magnetic Man	Magnetic Man	Dubstep, drum and bass, breakbeat hardcore	Startime International, Columbia	
October 8	Pavlov's Dog	The Adventures of Echo & Boo and Assorted Small Tails	Progressive rock, art rock	Rockville Music	
October 11	Belle and Sebastian	Belle and Sebastian Write About Love	Indie pop	Rough Trade	
October 11	Joanne Shaw Taylor	Diamonds in the Dirt	Blues rock, electric blues	Ruf	
October 11	Steve Lukather	All's Well That Ends Well	Hard rock	Mascot	
October 12	CFCF	The River		RVNG Intl.	
October 12	Darius Rucker	Charleston, SC 1966	Country	Capitol Nashville	
October 12	Far East Movement	Free Wired	Dance-pop, hip-hop, electronic	Cherrytree, Interscope	
October 12	Gram Rabbit	Miracles & Metaphors	Indie rock, space rock, electropop	Cobraside, Royal Order	
October 12	Kno	Death Is Silent	Hip-hop	APOS Music, QN5 Music	
October 12	Madball	Empire	Hardcore punk	Good Fight Music	
October 12	Motionless in White	Creatures	Metalcore, gothic metal, post-hardcore	Fearless	
October 12	The Orb featuring David Gilmour	Metallic Spheres	Electronica	Columbia	
October 12	Sufjan Stevens	The Age of Adz	Synth-pop, art pop, electro-folk	Asthmatic Kitty	
October 12	Trapt	No Apologies	Alternative metal	Eleven Seven Music	
October 12	Valencia	Dancing with a Ghost	Alternative rock, pop-punk	I Surrender	
October 14	Avey Tare	Down There		Paw Tracks	
October 15	Kings of Leon	Come Around Sundown	Alternative rock	RCA	
October 15	Miley Cyrus (Hannah Montana)	Hannah Montana Forever	Pop, teen pop, pop rock	Walt Disney	
October 15	Symphorce	Unrestricted	Power metal	AFM	
October 18	Ghost	Opus Eponymous		Rise Above, Metal Blade, Trooper Entertainment	
October 18	Huey Lewis and the News	Soulsville	Soul	W.O.W. Records	
October 18	Shobaleader One	Shobaleader One: d'Demonstrator		Warp	
October 19	Allstar Weekend	Suddenly Yours	Pop rock	Hollywood	
October 19	Bad Books	Bad Books	Indie rock	Favorite Gentlemen, Razor & Tie	
October 19	Bo Burnham	Words Words Words	Comedy	Comedy Central	
October 19	Brian Eno with Leo Abrahams and Jon Hopkins	Small Craft on a Milk Sea	Electronic, ambient, experimental rock	Warp	
October 19	Dag Arnesen	Norwegian Song 3		Losen	
October 19	Elton John and Leon Russell	The Union	Rock	Decca	
October 19	Jim Bryson and The Weakerthans	The Falcon Lake Incident	Indie rock	Kelp, MapleMusic	
October 19	Rod Stewart	Fly Me to the Moon... The Great American Songbook Volume V	Jazz, traditional pop	J	
October 19	Shakira	Sale el Sol	Latin pop	Epic	
October 19	Sugarland	The Incredible Machine	Country	Mercury Nashville	
October 19	Teebs	Ardour	Instrumental hip-hop	Brainfeeder	
October 19	Zach Hill	Face Tat	Noise rock, noise, experimental	Sargent House	
October 22	Joe McElderry	Wide Awake	Pop, dance-pop, teen pop	Syco Music	
October 25	Anika	Anika	Dub, electronic, pop	Invada Records, Stones Throw	
October 25	Belanova	Sueño Electro I	Pop		
October 25	Bryan Ferry	Olympia	Sophisti-pop	Virgin	
October 25	Buddy Guy	Living Proof	Chicago blues, blues rock, electric blues	Silvertone, Jive	
October 25	Charlotte Church	Back to Scratch	Pop, alternative rock	Dooby Records	
October 25	Conducting from the Grave	Revenants	Deathcore, melodic death metal, technical death metal	Sumerian	
October 25	Kylesa	Spiral Shadow	Sludge metal	Season of Mist	
October 25	Monster Magnet	Mastermind	Stoner rock	Napalm	
October 25	Star One	Victims of the Modern Age	Progressive metal, space rock	Inside Out Music	
October 25	Taylor Swift	Speak Now	Country pop, pop rock	Big Machine	
October 25	Warpaint	The Fool	Art rock	Rough Trade	
October 26	1982	1982	Hip-hop	ShowOff Records, Brick Records	
October 26	Senses Fail	The Fire	Post-hardcore, emo	Vagrant	
October 26	Young the Giant	Young the Giant	Alternative rock, indie rock	Roadrunner	
October 27	Good Charlotte	Cardiology	Pop-punk	Capitol	
October 29	Cheryl Cole	Messy Little Raindrops	R&B, dance-pop	Fascination, Polydor	
October 29	Devlin	Bud, Sweat and Beers	British hip-hop, grime	Island, Universal	
October 31	Alexisonfire	Dog's Blood	Post-hardcore, hardcore punk	Dine Alone	
October 31	Helloween	7 Sinners	Power metal	SPV/Steamhammer, Spinefarm	

=== November ===
List of albums released in November 2010
Go to: January | February | March | April | May | June | July | August | September | October | November | December | Back to top
Release date	Artist	Album	Genre	Label	Ref.
November 1	Anne Sofie von Otter and Brad Mehldau	Love Songs	Nouvelle chanson	Naïve	
November 1	Cradle of Filth	Darkly, Darkly, Venus Aversa	Extreme metal	Peaceville	
November 1	Electric Wizard	Black Masses	Doom metal, stoner metal	Rise Above	
November 1	Jamiroquai	Rock Dust Light Star	Funk, rock, R&B	Universal, Mercury	
November 2	Bear Hands	Burning Bush Supper Club	Experimental rock, indie rock, post-punk	Cantora	
November 2	Escape the Fate	Escape the Fate	Alternative metal, post-hardcore, hard rock	Interscope	
November 2	Jason Aldean	My Kinda Party	Country	Broken Bow	
November 2	Mariah Carey	Merry Christmas II You	Christmas	Island Def Jam	
November 2	Matt and Kim	Sidewalks	Dance-punk, synth-pop	Fader Label	
November 2	N.E.R.D.	Nothing	Blues, pop, soft rock	Star Trak, Interscope	
November 2	Pitbull	Armando	Pop rap	Mr. 305 Inc., Sony Latino	
November 8	Atheist	Jupiter	Technical death metal	Season of Mist	
November 8	James Blunt	Some Kind of Trouble	Pop rock, folk rock	Atlantic, Custard, Epic	
November 8	Nadine	Insatiable	R&B, pop	Black Pen Records	
November 9	Brian Johnson	Love Came Down - Live Acoustic Worship in the Studio			
November 9	Brokencyde	Will Never Die	Crunkcore	BreakSilence	
November 9	Cassandra Wilson	Silver Pony	Jazz, blues, pop	Blue Note	
November 9	CeeLo Green	The Lady Killer	Soul, R&B, funk	Elektra	
November 9	Deathspell Omega	Paracletus	Black metal, avant-garde metal	Norma Evangelium Diaboli	
November 9	Gwar	Bloody Pit of Horror	Thrash metal, groove metal, doom metal	Metal Blade	
November 9	Kid Cudi	Man on the Moon II: The Legend of Mr. Rager	Alternative hip-hop	Dream On, GOOD Music, Universal Motown	
November 9	The Ocean	Anthropocentric	Post-metal, sludge metal, progressive metal	Metal Blade	
November 9	Reba McEntire	All the Women I Am	Country	Starstruck, Valory	
November 9	Saroos	See Me Not	Post-rock, electronica	Anticon, Alien Transistor	
November 9	Shigeto	Full Circle	Electronic	Ghostly International	
November 9	Tobacco	LA UTI	Electronic	Anticon	
November 9	Underoath	Ø (Disambiguation)	Metalcore, post-hardcore	Solid State, Tooth & Nail	
November 9	Zion I	Atomic Clock	Hip-hop	Gold Dust Media	
November 12	Annie Lennox	A Christmas Cornucopia	Christmas, world	Island, Decca	
November 12	Nelly	5.0	Hip-hop, pop, R&B	Derrty, Universal Motown, Universal	
November 12	Rihanna	Loud	R&B, dance-pop	Def Jam, SRP	
November 15	A Day to Remember	What Separates Me from You	Post-hardcore, metalcore, pop-punk	Victory	
November 15	Girl Talk	All Day	Mashup	Illegal Art	
November 15	McFly	Above the Noise	Pop rock, pop, EDM	Universal Island	
November 15	Take That	Progress	Pop rock, pop, electropop	Polydor	
November 16	Keith Urban	Get Closer	Country pop, pop rock, country rock	Hit Red, Capitol Nashville	
November 16	Kid Rock	Born Free	Country, heartland rock	Atlantic	
November 16	No Joy	Ghost Blonde	Shoegaze, noise pop	Mexican Summer	
November 16	Rascal Flatts	Nothing Like This	Country	Big Machine	
November 16	The Russian Futurists	The Weight's on the Wheels	Indie pop	Upper Class Recordings	
November 16	Stereolab	Not Music	Post-rock	Duophonic, Drag City	
November 19	Christina Aguilera and Cher	Burlesque: Original Motion Picture Soundtrack		Screen Gems, Inc, RCA	
November 19	JLS	Outta This World	R&B, pop	Epic	
November 19	Kesha	Cannibal	Dance-pop	RCA	
November 19	Westlife	Gravity	Pop, dance-pop	Syco Music, Sony Music, RCA	
November 22	Gangrene	Gutter Water	Hip-hop	Decon	
November 22	Girls	Broken Dreams Club	Indie rock	True Panther	
November 22	Jessica Simpson	Happy Christmas	Pop, Christmas, R&B	Primary Wave, eleveneleven	
November 22	Kanye West	My Beautiful Dark Twisted Fantasy	Hip-hop	Def Jam, Roc-A-Fella	
November 22	Lloyd Banks	H.F.M. 2 (The Hunger for More 2)	Hip-hop	G-Unit, EMI	
November 22	My Chemical Romance	Danger Days: The True Lives of the Fabulous Killjoys	Alternative rock, punk rock	Reprise	
November 22	Ne-Yo	Libra Scale	R&B, Europop	Def Jam, Compound Entertainment	
November 22	Nicki Minaj	Pink Friday	Hip-hop, R&B, pop	Young Money, Cash Money, Universal Motown	
November 22	Robyn	Body Talk	Electropop, synth-pop	Konichiwa	
November 22	Yelawolf	Trunk Muzik 0-60	Hip-hop	Ghet-O-Vision, DGC, Interscope	
November 23	After the Burial	In Dreams	Progressive metal, metalcore, deathcore	Sumerian	
November 23	Agalloch	Marrow of the Spirit	Black metal, folk metal, doom metal	Profound Lore	
November 23	Yngwie Malmsteen	Relentless	Neoclassical metal, heavy metal	Rising Force, Koch	
November 26	Alesha Dixon	The Entertainer	R&B	Asylum	
November 26	Black Eyed Peas	The Beginning	Pop	Interscope	
November 26	Duffy	Endlessly	Pop	A&M	
November 26	Manowar	Battle Hymns MMXI	Power metal	Magic Circle Music	
November 29	Jazmine Sullivan	Love Me Back	R&B, hip-hop soul	J, Arista	
November 30	Chrisette Michele	Let Freedom Reign	R&B	Def Jam	
November 30	Flo Rida	Only One Flo (Part 1)	Pop-rap, hip house, dance	Atlantic, Poe Boy	
November 30	Soulja Boy	The DeAndre Way	Hip-hop	SOD, Collipark Music, Interscope	

=== December ===
List of albums released in December 2010
Go to: January | February | March | April | May | June | July | August | September | October | November | December | Back to top
Release date	Artist	Album	Genre	Label	Ref.
December 3	Daft Punk	Tron: Legacy	Electronic	Walt Disney	
December 3	Die Krupps	Als wären wir für immer	Industrial, EBM	Synthetic Symphony	
December 6	Deadmau5	4×4=12	Progressive house, electro house	Mau5trap, Ultra, Virgin	
December 6	Mylène Farmer	Bleu noir	Dance-pop, electropop, synth-pop	Universal Music France	
December 6	Not Squares	Yeah OK		Richter Collective, Teto Records	
December 7	Diane Birch	The Velveteen Age	Neo soul, pop, gospel	S-Curve	
December 7	Feist	Look at What the Light Did Now	Alternative rock	Arts & Crafts Productions	
December 7	Hinder	All American Nightmare	Hard rock	Universal Republic	
December 7	I, the Breather	These Are My Sins	Metalcore	Sumerian	
December 7	Natasha Bedingfield	Strip Me	Pop	Epic, Phonogenic	
December 7	Plain White T's	Wonders of the Younger	Alternative rock, indie rock, emo pop	Hollywood	
December 7	T.I.	No Mercy	Hip-hop	Grand Hustle, Atlantic	
December 10	Ciara	Basic Instinct	R&B	LaFace, Jive	
December 14	Crystal Bowersox	Farmer's Daughter	Folk rock, country	Jive, 19	
December 14	The Damned Things	Ironiclast	Hard rock, heavy metal	Mercury, Island	
December 14	Diddy – Dirty Money	Last Train to Paris	Hip-hop, house	Bad Boy, Interscope	
December 14	R. Kelly	Love Letter		Jive	
December 14	Ryan Adams & the Cardinals	III/IV	Alternative country, country rock	PAX AM	
December 15	Mr. Big	What If...	Hard rock	WHD Entertainment, Victor, Frontiers	
December 17	Ektomorf	Redemption	Groove metal, nu metal	AFM	
December 17	Keri Hilson	No Boys Allowed	R&B	Mosley Music, Zone 4, Interscope	
December 17	LaViVe	No Sleep	Dance-pop	Starwatch	
December 20	Wire	Red Barked Tree	Post-punk, experimental rock	Pinkflag	
December 21	David Banner and 9th Wonder	Death of a Pop Star	Hip-hop	Big Face Entertainment, eOne	
December 21	Duran Duran	All You Need Is Now	New wave, pop rock	S-Curve	
December 21	Jamie Foxx	Best Night of My Life	R&B, hip-hop	J	
December 21	Keyshia Cole	Calling All Hearts	R&B	Geffen, Interscope	
December 25	Gorillaz	The Fall	Lo-fi, electronic	Parlophone, Virgin	
December 25	Klaxons	Landmarks of Lunacy	Alternative rock		
