= MU.ZZ.LE =

Studio album by Gonjasufi
- Released: January 24, 2012
- Genres: Alternative hip-hop; experimental; psychedelic rock; lo-fi
- Length: 24:34
- Language: English
- Label: Warp
- Producers: Psychopop; Angelo Arce; Gonjasufi

Gonjasufi chronology
The Caliph's Tea Party (2010)	MU.ZZ.LE (2012)	Callus (2016)

Professional ratings
Aggregate scores
Source	Rating
AnyDecentMusic?	6.8/10
Metacritic	69/100
Review scores
Source	Rating
AllMusic	3/5 stars
Clash	8/10
Fact	3.5/5.0
The Guardian	4/5 stars
MusicOMH	3.5/5 stars
NME	4/5 stars
Pitchfork	7.8/10
PopMatters	7/10
Sputnikmusic	3.0/5.0
Tiny Mix Tapes	3.5/5 stars

MU.ZZ.LE is the second studio album by Gonjasufi (Sumach Ecks), following his first album, A Sufi and a Killer. The record was released by Warp on January 24, 2012 and produced one single "The Blame". Reviewed by 23 critics on Metacritic, the album received an average score of 69% which means "generally favorable reviews". Meanwhile, the song "Nikels And Dimes" was sampled in the track "Nickels And Dimes" by rapper Jay-Z from his 2013 album Magna Carta Holy Grail.

== Reception ==
At AnyDecentMusic?, that collates critical reviews from more than 50 media sources, the album scored 6.8 points out of 10, based on 23 reviews. MU.ZZ.LE received an average score of 69/100 from 23 reviewers on Metacritic, indicating "generally favorable reviews".

Nate Patrin of Pitchfork commented "MU.ZZ.LE might be a transitional point on Gonjasufi's path and it shows just one face of an eclectic, multifaceted performer. But it's also that rare album that feels meditative and cathartic all at once." Jonathan Linds of PopMatters added "If A Sufi and a Killer introduced us to an engaging new presence, then MU.ZZ.LE is his first artistically cohesive statement: a bold first stab at playing with space and mood. It’s a compelling reason to keep watching to see what he’ll do next, because if this is what Gonjasufi sounds like muzzled, we should all be very afraid when he finally decides to unleash." Daniel Paton of musicOMH stated "However, dark and compelling though MU.ZZ.LE undoubtedly is, there is the niggling sense that this greater focus and narrow tempo range doesn’t really suit Gonjasufi. A track like The Blame seems almost conventional, and maybe even a little pedestrian by this artist’s fearless standards. Clearly, expecting mere repetition of the wheel is unfair – but MU.ZZ.LE does seem to work more as a more concentrated appendix to A Sufi And A Killer. It doesn’t necessarily suggest the most effective way forward." Reef Younis of Clash wrote "Notably shorter than its predecessor, ‘MU.ZZ.LE’ is just as rich and arresting, cataloguing Sumach's echoes, mumbles and stumbles through an album of lethargic trip hop and uneasy paranoia."

== Track listing ==
All tracks are written by Gonjasufi.

No.	Title	Length
1.	"White Picket Fence"	1:47
2.	"Feedin' Birds"	1:56
3.	"Nikels and Dimes"	3:50
4.	"Rubberband"	1:53
5.	"Venom"	2:43
6.	"Timeout"	2:52
7.	"Skin"	2:28
8.	"The Blame"	3:25
9.	"Blaksuit"	2:19
10.	"Sniffin'"	1:26
Total length:		24:34

== Personnel ==
- Sumach Valentine – executive producer
- Noel Summerville – mastering
- Mr. IMD – mixing, sequencing, design, layout
- Angelo Arce – producer (tracks: 3 4 7)
- Gonjasufi – producer (tracks: 3 5 6 8 9 10), mixing
- Psychopop – producer (tracks: 1 2 4 7)
