= Volatility =

Volatility or volatile may refer to:

== Chemistry ==
- Volatility (chemistry), a measuring tendency of a substance or liquid to vaporize easily
  - Volatile organic compounds, organic or carbon compounds that can evaporate at normal temperature and pressure
    - Volatile anaesthetics, a class of anaesthetics which evaporate or vaporize easily
    - Volatile substance abuse, the abuse of household inhalants containing volatile compounds
    - Volatile oil, also known as essential oil, an oil derived from plants with aromatic compounds used in cosmetic and flavoring industries
- Relative volatility, a measure of vapor pressures of the components in a liquid mixture
- Volatile acid/Volatile acidity, a term used inconsisitenly across the fields of winemaking, wastewater treatment, physiology, and other fields
- Volatile (astrogeology), a group of compounds with low boiling points that are associated with a planet's or moon's crust and atmosphere

== Computer science ==
- Volatile variables, variables that can be changed by an external process
- Volatile memory, memory that lasts only while the power is on (and thus would be lost after a restart)
- Volatility (memory forensics), an open source memory forensics tool

== Other uses ==
- Volatility (finance), degree of variation over time
- Volatiles, the volatile compounds of magma (mostly water vapor) that affect the appearance and strength of volcanoes
- Stochastic volatility, in the mathematical theory of probability
- Pedersen index, a measure of electoral volatility in political party systems
- One of the components of the set of phenomena known as volatility, uncertainty, complexity and ambiguity
- Volatile Games, a video games maker
- Volatile (A Hero A Fake album), 2008
- Volatile (The Lime Spiders album), 1988
- Volatile (horse), a racehorse
