= Internal Logic (album) =

2012 Grass Widow album

Studio album by Grass Widow
- Released: May 22, 2012
- Label: HLR

Grass Widow chronology
Past Time (2010)	Internal Logic (2012)

Internal Logic is the third and final album by Bay Area trio Grass Widow, released on May 22, 2012. It was their first self-released album.

According to Hannah Lew, the band "just wanted to write songs that had positive affirmations and were fun to play," after Past Time's focus on death and grief. Lillian Maring said that "This record is us relaxing into what we want to be as a band."

== Reception ==
Pitchfork rated the album 7.7/10, praising the band's "total command" of their sound. Consequence of Sound described the band as "a three-headed serpent of sugary harmonies," and criticized the band for offering a "mirror image of the band’s previous outings." Spin rated the album 8/10, describing it as "A Slits and Shangri-Las summit where heavenly three-part harmonies dance atop jagged post-punk guitars."

== Track listing ==
All music is composed by Grass Widow.

No.	Title	Length
1.	"Goldilocks Zone"	03:15
2.	"Hang Around"	02:59
3.	"Milo Minute"	02:01
4.	"Under the Atmosphere"	03:06
5.	"Disappearing Industries"	02:35
6.	"A Light in the Static"	01:34
7.	"Spock on MUNI"	03:10
8.	"Advice"	03:01
9.	"Cover You"	02:34
10.	"Whistling in the Dark"	03:32
11.	"Response to Photographs"	01:40
Total length:		29:27
