= Tales from Sadness =

Studio album by Raintime
- Released: 6 May 2005
- Recorded: 2004
- Genres: Melodic death metal Power metal
- Length: 46:34
- Label: Arise Records

Raintime chronology
Tales from Sadness (2005)	Flies & Lies (2007)

Professional ratings
Review scores
Source	Rating
Rock Hard	7/10
Scream Magazine	5/6
Noise.fi	3/5
Heavymetal.dk	6/10
Vampster	

Tales from Sadness is the debut album from Italian metal band Raintime. It was released in 2005.

== Track listing ==
1. "Moot-Lie" – 5:51
2. "Faithland" – 5:08
3. "Creation" – 1:01 (instrumental)
4. "The Experiment" – 6:32
5. "Denied Recollection" – 6:22
6. "Chains of Sadness" – 5:15
7. "Using the Light Forever" – 5:31
8. "Daily Execution/Paradox Defeat" – 6:08
