= Neo Boys =

American punk band

- Origin: Portland, Oregon, United States
- Genres: Punk rock
- Years active: 1977-1983
- Label: K Records
- Past members: Pat Baum; Meg Hentges; Kim Kincaid; K.T. Kincaid; Jennifer LoBianco; Carol Stienel

Neo Boys was an American punk band from Portland, Oregon, United States, active from 1978-1983. Considered Portland's first all-female punk band, Neo Boys are noted for their political and feminist lyrics. Hannah Lew, of Grass Widow, wrote: "They created a world I have taken refuge in during times when I felt the effects of narrow attitudes about gender and women's voices in music."

== History ==
Before Neo Boys was formed, Kim Kincaid, K.T. Kincaid and Jennifer LoBianco were part of Formica and the Bitches. The band only played a few shows before breaking up.

Neo Boys band members included Kim Kincaid (vocals), K.T. Kincaid (bass), Jennifer LoBianco (guitar) and Pat Baum (drums). After Jennifer LoBianco left the Neoboys, Carol Steinel played guitar with the band from 1979 to 1980, followed by Meg Hentges who joined as a guitarist in 1980. Jennifer went on to form the band, Randy and the Randies before leaving for Los Angeles in 1980.

They regularly shared bills with The Wipers, opened for Nico, and played their first show with Television. Most of their early shows were performed in basements, colleges, and art galleries.

Keeping with the punk template at the time, the band started as four teens making loud sounds and writing self-reflective lyrics. But this quartet was one of the first all-female groups of its kind in Portland, distinct when compared to the city's male-dominated music scene.

Neo Boys were featured in Northwest Passage: The Birth of Portland's DIY Culture.

== Discography ==
=== EPs ===
- Crumbling Myths (1982, self-released)
- Neo Boys (1980, Greg Sage's Trap Records), Tracks: "Never Comes Down", "Give Me the Message" and "Rich Man’s Dream"

=== Compilations/Live ===
- 10/29/79 (1979, Live LP, also featuring The Wipers and Sado-Nation)
- Sooner or Later (2013, 2CD, K Records/Mississippi Records)

=== Documentary ===
- Northwest Passage: The Birth of Portland's DIY Culture
