= Mandela Effect (album) =

Remix album by Gonjasufi
- Released: April 7, 2017
- Genre: Alternative hip-hop; experimental; psychedelic rock; lo-fi
- Length: 48:05
- Label: Warp
- Producer: Gonjasufi

Gonjasufi chronology
Callus (2016)	Mandela Effect (2017)

Professional ratings
Aggregate scores
Source	Rating
Metacritic	69/100
Review scores
Source	Rating
AllMusic	3.5/5 stars
The Line of Best Fit	7/10
Pop Matters	7/10

Mandela Effect is the second remix album by American musician Gonjasufi (Sumach Ecks), released by record label Warp in 2017. His collaborators include underground hip-hop group Shabazz Palaces, Daddy G from Massive Attack, and Nigerian percussionist Tony Allen. The album contains 16 tracks—remixes from his previous album Callus as well as several originals and collaborations. The title refers to the phenomenon of false memories which are shared by numerous people, dubbed the "Mandela effect" by some in reference to mistaken memories of the death of Nelson Mandela before he became president of South Africa.

== Reception ==
At Metacritic, that assigns a normalized rating out of 100 to reviews from mainstream critics, the album received an average score of 69, based on four reviews, which indicates "generally favorable reviews".

Andy Cush of Spin stated "Gonjasufi’s psychedelic blasts of bass and spiritual noise have always been disorienting–the kind of music that might impels you to check your headphone jack to make sure everything is plugged in correctly, or is it really supposed to sound like that? Now, he’s applying his off-kilter sensibility to release formats as well... The name is probably instructive in terms of how Gonjasufi wants The Mandela Effect to be received: as a relic from another reality that diverges from Callus in some ways but reflects it in others. Trippy." Paul Carr of PopMatters added "It is incredibly difficult to make remix albums hang together well and Mandela Effect is no different. There is a distinct absence of flow to the album as each reinterpretation proves to be so radically different. Nonetheless, each guest adds something memorable with certain songs arguably more powerful than the originals. Impressively, the whole thing retains the angular peril and stifling claustrophobia of the original but with slightly more light and shade. As an alternate version of his Callous [sic] album, it is one well worth remembering."

Paul Simpson of AllMusic commented "Mandela Effect is certainly more varied than Callus (which, like all Gonjasufi releases, is a heady mix of styles itself), and while it isn't exactly lighter or more listener-friendly, it often seems to get its messages across in more intriguing ways". Nathan Westley of The Line of Best Fit noted "At its heart, Mandela Effect is an exploration of texture, something made most evident on the abstract hip-hop which lays at the burning central core of Shabazz Palaces' reworked version of "Afrikan Spaceship" – a track centred around an intermittent bass-driven rhythm and motorcycle samples. King Britt's take on the same song, however, sees it arrive in a dub-touched trenchcoat. In all, it's pretty confusing. But with Mandela Effect, Gonjasufi has created a truly stimulating album that will be quite unlike any other released this year."

== Track listing ==
No.	Title	Writer(s)	Length
1.	"(X) (Intro)"	Gonjasufi	0:28
2.	"Show (Beth Gibbons / Rustin Man Cover)"	Beth Gibbons	2:53
3.	"Your Maker (Daddy G Remix)"	Gonjasufi	3:56
4.	"Afrikan Spaceship (Shabazz Palaces Rework)"	King Britt, Gonjasufi	3:46
5.	"Maniac Depressant (Perera Elsewhere Remix)"	Gonjasufi	4:24
6.	"When I Die (IMD Remix)"	Gonjasufi	4:00
7.	"(Y) (Interlude)"	Gonjasufi	0:36
8.	"The Conspiracy (Santiro Romeri Remix)"	Gonjasufi	3:36
9.	"Your Maker (Anna Wise Remaker)"	Gonjasufi	3:17
10.	"Afrikan Spaceship (Ras G Ghettoscifi Remix)"	Gonjasufi	3:17
11.	"Maniac Depressant (Innsyter Remix)"	Gonjasufi	2:59
12.	"Vinaigrette (Dave Parley Remix)"	Gonjasufi	2:59
13.	"Afrikan Spaceship (King Britt Rework)"	Gonjasufi	2:58
14.	"The Kill (Moor Mother Remix)"	Gonjasufi	2:17
15.	"Etherwave (feat. Tony Allen)"	Gonjasufi	3:13
16.	"(Z) (Outro)"	Gonjasufi	1:36
Total length:			48:05

== Personnel ==
- Gonjasufi – composer, mixing, producer
- Pearl Thompson – guitar
- Tony Allen – featured artist
- Beth Gibbons – composer
