= Callus (album) =

Studio album by Gonjasufi
- Released: August 19, 2016
- Genre: Alternative hip-hop; experimental; psychedelic rock; lo-fi
- Length: 51:57
- Language: English
- Label: Warp
- Producer: Gonjasufi

Gonjasufi chronology
MU.ZZ.LE (2012)	Callus (2016)	Mandela Effect (2017)

Professional ratings
Aggregate scores
Source	Rating
AnyDecentMusic?	6.4/10
Metacritic	66/100
Review scores
Source	Rating
AllMusic	3.5/5 stars
Resident Advisor	3.7/5
The Guardian	4/5 stars
Pitchfork	7.6/10
Slant	2/5 stars
Louder Than War	8/10 stars
Pop Matters	6/10 stars
The Irish Times	3/5 stars
Spectrum Culture	3.25/5
Exclaim!	7/10 stars

Callus is the third studio album by Gonjasufi (Sumach Ecks). The album was released by Warp on August 19, 2016. Former Cure guitarist Pearl Thompson is also heavily featured on the album.

== Critical reception ==
Upon release Callus received an average score of 66/100 from 12 reviewers on Metacritic, indicating "generally favorable reviews". At AnyDecentMusic?, that collates critical reviews from more than 50 media sources, the album scored 6.4 points out of 10, based on 12 reviews.

Jim Carroll of The Irish Times commented "Listening to Callus, though, it’s clear that Ecks has done some hard living in the last few years and the songs are attempts at catharsis as he deals with events across both his homeland and his own personal universe. It’s dark, dissonant, raw and desolate, a collection of tracks which are often on the edge of collapse as Ecks pulls at the various threads holding them together." Andrew Ryce of Resident Advisor stated "Callus was made over the course four years, through frustration and hopelessness. It's not always an easy listen. Sometimes it sounds uncomfortably close, other times it's off-piste and rambling. The clarity of the songwriting varies wildly across its 19 tracks, though the sound quality doesn't, always rendered with the lo-fi fuzz of a busted mic and a TASCAM four-track. Callus is the sound of someone exorcising their demons with nothing but a few pieces of gear and his own snarling weapon of a voice—and growing stronger for it." John Paul of PopMatters added "With Callus, Gonjasufi has crafted an aural equivalent of this modern era. It’s a bleak, often painful listen that does not engender a sense of hope for the future. In this, the commentary acts as something of a self-reflection in which we see ourselves as we truly are as a society. It’s unflinching, unapologetic and at times bordering on unlistenable. But it’s a bold sonic statement that brutally conveys its intended message. In this, Callus proves a success."

== Track listing ==
All tracks are written by Gonjasufi.

No.	Title	Length
1.	"Your Maker"	3:10
2.	"Maniac Depressant"	1:56
3.	"Afrikan Spaceship"	3:25
4.	"Carolyn Shadows"	2:46
5.	"Ole Man Sufferah"	2:44
6.	"Greasemonkey"	1:17
7.	"The Kill"	1:44
8.	"Prints of Sin"	1:52
9.	"Krishna Punk"	2:00
10.	"Elephant Man"	1:28
11.	"The Conspiracy"	3:15
12.	"Poltergeist"	3:26
13.	"Vinaigrette"	2:16
14.	"Devils"	2:44
15.	"Surfinfinity"	4:04
16.	"When I Die"	2:30
17.	"The Jinx"	1:58
18.	"Shakin Parasites"	6:26
19.	"Last Nightmare"	3:05
Total length:		51:57

== Personnel ==
- Hassan Rahim – artwork
- Pearl Thompson – guitar (tracks: 7 12 13 15)
- Daddy Kev – mastering
- AGDM – mixing
- Timothy Saccenti – photography
- Gonjasufi – producer, mixing

== Chart performance ==
Chart (2017)	Peak position
US Top Dance/Electronic Albums (Billboard)	25
