= Flies & Lies =

Studio album by Raintime
- Released: 21 March 2007
- Recorded: 2006
- Genre: Melodic death metal Power metal Progressive metal
- Label: Lifeforce Records (Europe), Replica Records, Soundholic Records (Japan), Bieler Bros (USA, Canada & UK)
- Producer: Tommy Hansen

Raintime chronology
Tales From Sadness (2005)	Flies & Lies (2007)	Psychromatic (2010)

Professional ratings
Review scores
Source	Rating
Rock Hard	7/10
Metal.de	7/10
Powermetal.de	
Vampster	

Flies & Lies is the second release from the Italian melodic death metal band Raintime. It was released in 2007, in Japan on 21 March, in Sweden, United States, Canada, and the United Kingdom on 25 May, and 28 May for the rest of Europe.

It was produced by Tommy Hansen.

== Track listing ==
No.	Title	Length
1.	"Flies & Lies"	5:01
2.	"Rolling Chances"	4:38
3.	"Apeiron"	4:21
4.	"Rainbringer"	4:01
5.	"Finally Me"	4:34
6.	"Tears of Sorrow"	3:55
7.	"The Black Well"	4:43
8.	"Beat It" (Michael Jackson cover)	3:44
9.	"Another Transition"	4:27
10.	"Burning Doll"	1:11
11.	"Matrioska"	5:47
Total length:		51:22

== Personnel ==
=== Raintime ===
- Claudio Coassin: Vocals, "Animal Sounds"
- Matteo DiBon: Rhythm Guitar
- Luca Michael Martina: Lead Guitar
- Andrea Corona: Keyboards
- Michele Colussi: Bass
- Enrico Fabris: Drums, Percussion

=== Additional Personnel ===
- Tommy Hansen: Vocal Backing, Pipe Organ
- Lars F. Larsen: Vocal Backing
