= The Caliph's Tea Party =

Remix album by Gonjasufi
- Released: October 4, 2010
- Genre: Alternative hip-hop; experimental; psychedelic rock; lo-fi
- Length: 48:04
- Label: Warp
- Producer: Gonjasufi; The Gaslamp Killer; Flying Lotus; Mainframe

Gonjasufi chronology
| A Sufi and a Killer (2010) | The Caliph's Tea Party (2010) | MU.ZZ.LE (2012) |

Professional ratings
Aggregate scores
| Source | Rating |
|---|---|
| AnyDecentMusic? | 6.7/10 |
Review scores
| Source | Rating |
| AllMusic | 3/5 stars |
| Drowned in Sound | 6/10 |
| Pitchfork | 6.2/10 |
| The Skinny | 4/5 stars |
| Uncut | 4/5 stars |

The Caliph's Tea Party is a remix studio album by American musician Gonjasufi. The album was released on October 4, 2010 by Warp label. The album is a complete reworking of his debut album A Sufi and a Killer released earlier the same year.

== Reception ==
At AnyDecentMusic?, that collates critical reviews from more than 50 media sources, the album scored 6.7 points out of 10, based on six reviews.

Rory Gibb of Drowned in Sound stated "By all rights, at least the first half of this review ought to act as penance for my write-up of Gonjasufi’s debut, A Sufi & A Killer, on this very site. Upon its release earlier this year, the main emotion it evoked was a strong sense of confusion, as though hidden underneath its abrasive surface was something greater just out of reach. It turns out that was exactly the case; several months down the line it has slowly burned its way into the list of 2010’s most accomplished – if least obvious - albums. The trick lies in its deft fusion of old and new." Martin Skivington of The Skinny added "Sumach 'Gonjasufi' Ecks is an esoteric vocalist whose excellent debut album A Sufi And A Killer, released earlier this year, saw him link up with major players from the alt-beats scene, including Flying Lotus and Gaslamp Killer. The Caliph's Tea Party brings an equally subversive band of audiophiles on board to remix the entire album. There's no lack of talent here — Bibio, Dam Mantle and Bear In Heaven all chip in — so the results are unsurprisingly impressive.

== Track listing ==
All tracks are written by Gonjasufi.

| No. | Title | Length |
|---|---|---|
| 1. | "Ancestors (Dreamtime) [Mark Prichard Remix]" | 5:42 |
| 2. | "Candylane [Bibo Remix]" | 5:42 |
| 3. | "Ageing [Dam Mantle Remix]" | 4:14 |
| 4. | "The Caliph's Tea Party [Broadcast & the Focus Group "DedNd" Remix]" | 5:22 |
| 5. | "Kobwebz [Jeremiah Jae Remix]" | 3:09 |
| 6. | "Love of Reign [Bear In Heaven Remix]" | 3:18 |
| 7. | "She's Gone [Oneohtrix Point Never Remix]" | 3:28 |
| 8. | "Holidays [MRR Remix]" | 2:26 |
| 9. | "Change [Shlomo Remix]" | 4:47 |
| 10. | "My Only Friend [Hezus Remix]" | 4:01 |
| 11. | "DedNd [Agdm Remix]" | 3:29 |
| 12. | "SuzieQ [Dem Hunger Bowel Blood Remix]" | 2:26 |
| Total length: | | 48:04 |
