= Breakthrough (The Gaslamp Killer album) =

Studio album by the Gaslamp Killer
- Released: September 17, 2012
- Genres: Alternative hip-hop; electronic
- Length: 47:25
- Label: Brainfeeder
- Producer: The Gaslamp Killer

The Gaslamp Killer chronology
Breakthrough (2012)	The Gaslamp Killer Experience: Live in Los Angeles (2015)

Professional ratings
Aggregate scores
Source	Rating
Metacritic	66/100
Review scores
Source	Rating
AllMusic	3/5 stars
BBC	favorable
Consequence of Sound	C+
Drowned in Sound	7/10
Fact	4/5
The Guardian	3/5 stars
NME	6/10
Pitchfork	7.7/10
PopMatters	7/10 stars

Breakthrough is the first studio album by American alternative-hip-hop producer the Gaslamp Killer. It was released on Brainfeeder on September 17, 2012. The album features guest appearances from Gonjasufi, Daedelus, and Samiyam, among others.

== Background and recording ==
While The Gaslamp Killer's earlier work was characterized by a heavy use of samples, on Breakthrough he chose to work with musicians to recreate the "vibe" of particular tracks. Comparing his method to the way that Led Zeppelin and The Rolling Stones used blues music, he said, "I'm just trying to get ideas from world music, different rock 'n' roll records, library records, psychedelic shit, jazz – getting ideas from other records and trying to recreate them with musicians."

== Critical reception ==
At Metacritic, which assigns a weighted average score out of 100 to reviews from mainstream critics, Breakthrough received an average score of 66% based on 18 reviews, indicating "generally favorable reviews".

== Track listing ==
No.	Title	Length
1.	"Breakthrough"	2:15
2.	"Veins" (featuring Gonjasufi)	1:45
3.	"Holy Mt. Washington" (featuring Computer Jay)	2:27
4.	"Father"	1:13
5.	"Critic" (featuring Mophono)	2:20
6.	"Dead Vets" (featuring Adrian Younge)	2:25
7.	"Flange Face" (featuring Miguel Atwood-Ferguson)	3:39
8.	"Fuck"	1:11
9.	"Apparitions" (featuring Gonjasufi)	2:51
10.	"Impulse" (featuring Daedelus)	3:33
11.	"Peasants, Cripples & Retards" (featuring Samiyam)	2:15
12.	"Meat Guilt" (featuring R.S.I)	1:50
13.	"Mother"	2:59
14.	"Nissim" (featuring Amir Yaghmai)	4:31
15.	"Keep It Simple Stupid" (featuring Shigeto)	1:46
16.	"Seven Years of Bad Luck for Fun" (featuring Dimlite)	3:52
17.	"In the Dark..."	6:23

== Charts ==
Chart	Peak position
Top Dance/Electronic Albums	23
