= Raintime =

Italian metal band

- Origin: Pordenone, Italy
- Genres: Melodic death metal, power metal, progressive metal
- Years active: 1999–2012
- Labels: Arise, Soundholic, Replica, Lifeforce, Bieler Bros.
- Members: Claudio Coassin; Matteo Di Bon; Luca Michael Martina; Michele Colussi; Enrico Fabris; Andrea Corona
- Past members: Matteo Barzan; Francesco Rossi; Giovanni Buora; Carlo Nadalin

Raintime was an Italian melodic death metal / power metal band founded in 1999. The band was inspired by Dream Theater and leaned towards progressive metal.

== History ==
The band recorded the instrumental demo Jump in the Past. After its release, Enrico Fabris replaced the original drummer. Keyboardist Claudio Coassin switched to vocals, leaving keyboards to Andrea Corona. Their sound borrows elements from extreme metal, such as death growls and lower tuning, and from melodic genres, especially keyboards and vocals. The band recorded their debut album, Tales from Sadness, in 2005 with Arise Records. Their second album, Flies & Lies (Lifeforce), was released in 2007 and produced by Tommy Handsen. Raintime performed at ProgPower USA with bands like After Forever, Virgin Steele and Sonata Arctica. Their latest album, Psychromatic, was released in 2010.

Raintime stated on 27 May 2012 that the band would split due to "too many new members". Claudio, Enrico and Ivan have worked on the side project Fake Idols.

== Members ==
- Claudio Coassin – vocals
- Daniele "Acido" Bressa – lead guitar
- Ivan Odorico – guitar
- Dario Battiston – bass
- Andrea Corona – keyboards
- Enrico Fabris – drums
- Parham Amini – bass (studio)

== Discography ==
- Jump in the Past (demo, self-produced, 2000)
- Tales from Sadness (album, Arise, 2005)
- Flies & Lies (album, Lifeforce, 2007)
- Psychromatic (album, Lifeforce, 2010)
