= A Hero A Fake =

American metalcore band

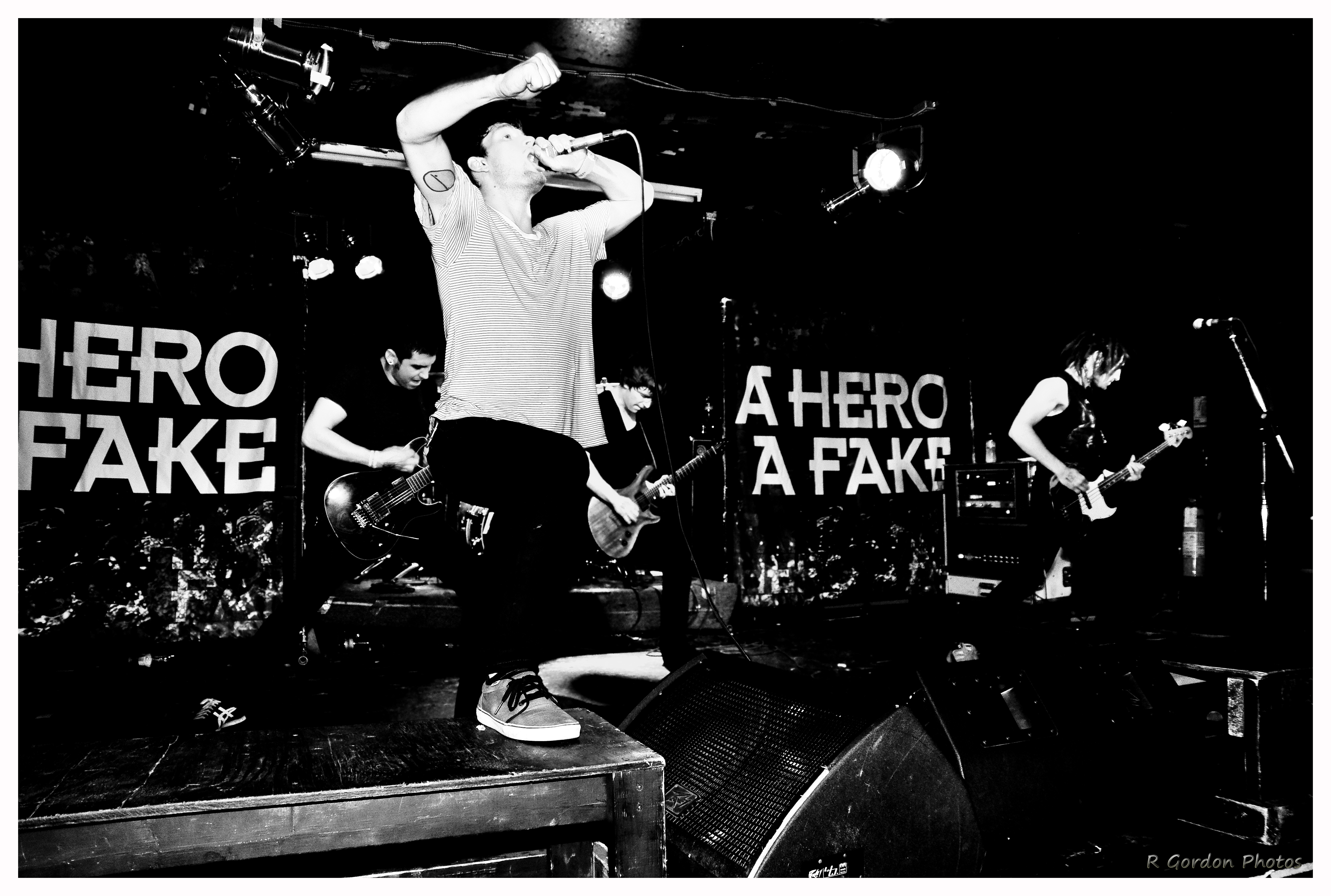
- Live in Sacramento 2011

Background information
- Origin: Charlotte, North Carolina, U.S.
- Genres: Metalcore, progressive metal
- Years active: 2004–2013
- Label: Victory
- Members: Justin Brown; Eric Morgan; Patrick Jeffers; Evan Kirkley
- Past members: Lenin Hernandez; Peter Gwynn; Matt Davis; Tim Burgess; Brendon Campau; Chris Rosser
- Website: www.aheroafake.com

A Hero A Fake was an American metalcore band from Charlotte, North Carolina, United States. Forming in 2004, they signed to Victory Records in July 2008. Their debut album Volatile was released in October 2008 and their follow up Let Oceans Lie released in January 2010.

== History ==
=== Formation and self-releases (2004–2007) ===
A Hero A Fake was formed in late 2004 in Charlotte, North Carolina by Eric Morgan, Justin Brown, and Lenin Hernandez while they were in high school at Olympic High School, picking up freshman drummer Brendon Campau (former). The band was originally named Nothing Gold Can Stay but was changed during the recording of their first demo. In February 2005, they recorded an untitled six song demo, AHAF Demo 2005, which they distributed at their first shows during the spring of 2005. Their initial sound was heavily influenced by bands like Thrice, Senses Fail, A Static Lullaby, and Underoath. As such, the music on their first demo is considered to be melodic post-hardcore.

In June 2005, drummer Evan Kirkley (formerly of Cambridge and the Lifeforce Records band Seneca) joined A Hero A Fake to record the Friends Are Family EP. The five song EP featured the song Click Click which would later be re-recorded and included as a secret song at the end of their second full-length album, Let Oceans Lie. The sound present on this recording had shifted towards a more metalcore influence. The band continued to perform at regional shows until guitarist Eric Morgan and vocalist Justin Brown moved to Chapel Hill, North Carolina to attend University of North Carolina in September 2005.

In early 2006, Eric Morgan and Justin Brown decided to keep A Hero A Fake active by traveling from Raleigh to Charlotte each weekend between classes—a schedule they would retain for the following four years. In April 2006, Peter Gwynne took over on drums and shortly after Matt Davis joined on bass and Patrick Jeffers was added as the third guitarist. This lineup would end up recording a three song demo with producer and former Hopesfall member Christopher Kincaid, AHAF Demo 2007, which was self-released in January 2007. The three track demo included the song F-16 which was later re-recorded on the band's debut full-length Volatile. Peter Gwynne would eventually leave the band in response to an offer to play for Circle Takes The Square. During the summer of 2007, Tim Burgess joined the band on drums which would be the last lineup change for the next three years.

=== Volatile (2008–2009) ===
In December 2007, A Hero A Fake entered The Basement Recording studios with producer Jamie King to record their first full-length album. The band released the songs "I Know I", "F-16", and "Superwoman" on MySpace in April 2008. Three months later the band announced via their MySpace that they had signed a record deal with Chicago, Illinois based Victory Records. Their debut album, Volatile was released on October 28, 2008 to mixed reviews noting the band's use of "non-standard song structures" and its "fresh approach to technical metal." Criticisms of the album centered around vocal tones and underdeveloped passages "like a band who were swept into the label world before they were ready." The band garnered considerable buzz following their first album and was picked by Alternative Press as a band to know in 2009.

The release of Volatile was intended to be a developmental release for the band since college schedules prohibited properly touring during the album cycle. A music video for the album's single, "I Know I", was produced by Scott Hansen and premiered on MTV2 on February 21, 2009. Upon the members graduating college in May 2009, the band embarked on an east coast tour June and a midwest tour throughout most of July. In August 2009, the band announced via a video update that they were returning to the studio with producer Jamie King to record their second album. In October 2009, the band toured with Modern Day Escape. The following December, the band toured with Good Fight Entertainment band I Am Abominatio and fellow Victory Records labelmate Farewell to Freeway.

=== Let Oceans Lie (2010–2011) ===
On December 1, 2009, the band announced the name of their next album, Let Oceans Lie, and that it would release on January 19, 2010. The same day, Victory Records released the album's title track as a digital single via iTunes. A music video for Let Oceans Lie was once again produced by Scott Hansen which premiered on MTV2 and Fuse TV on February 8, 2010. A Hero A Fake hosted episode 54 of the VicTorV monthly video series. This album received a much better reception among critics citing "the progression displayed on this release is immense. While Volatile allowed the band get their feet wet in the waters of the post-hardcore scene, Let Oceans Lie mends together everything the band did right on their debut and delivers hundred fold." The band toured independently throughout the midwest and east coast during January and February 2010. During March and April 2010, the band headlined the Rise of Victory Tour with labelmates Farewell to Freeway and Before There Was Rosalyn. In May 2010, the band took part in the Rage tour to promote the new album of the same name by Artery Recordings band Attila. The tour also included the Mediaskare Records band Blind Witness and future Victory Records labelmate Dr. Acula. In August 2010, the band began the Blood In The Water tour with labelmates Corpus Christi and Bullet Tooth Records band Deception of a Ghost.

On December 1, 2010, Victory Records released the band's cover of the song "Looking Up" by Paramore. The next day the band started the Dismember December tour with CI Records band An Early Ending. Directly following that tour, the band joined the Metal Christmas tour headlined by Equal Vision Records band Texas In July along with supporting acts Like Moths To Flames and Destruction of a Rose.

In February 2011, the band entered Die in a Fire Studios to demo several new songs. On June 24, 2011, the band announced via Twitter that they had finished tracking the first batch of new songs.

=== The Future Again (2012–present) ===
After nearly a year without performing live, A Hero A Fake announced a new 17 stop tour on November 9, 2011. This was the band's first tour west of Texas and they made their first appearances in California.

On October 17, 2011, A Hero A Fake released a pre-EP version of a new song "The Constant". The band announced a new EP via their Facebook page on January 19, 2012 to be released during summer 2012 on Victory Records.

On May 23, 2012, AHAF announced the name of the new EP, as The Future Again. On August 26, they stated that they are breaking up after a final show in their hometown of Charlotte, North Carolina.

== Members ==
Current

- Justin Brown – vocals (2004–2013)†
- Eric Morgan – guitar (2004–2013)†
- Patrick Jeffers – guitar (2006–2013)‡
- Evan Kirkley – drums (2005, 2010–2013)

Former

- Alex Avigliano – guitar, vocals (2004–2009)†₦
- Peter Gwynne – drums (2006–2007)
- Matt Davis – bass guitar (2006–2010)†
- Tim Burgess – drums (2007–2010)
- Joshua Taddeo – bass guitar, vocals (2010–2011)
- Chris Rosser – bass guitar (2012–2013)
- Brendon Campau – drums (2004)

† denotes a founding member ₦ Born as Lenin Hernandez, filed for name change in 2008.

A Hero A Fake discography
- Studio albums: 2
- Extended plays: 2

== Studio albums ==
- Volatile (Victory Records, October, 2008)
- Let Oceans Lie (Victory Records, January, 2010)

== EP's ==
- Friends Are Family EP (self-released, July, 2005)
- The Future Again EP (Victory Records, July, 2012)

== Demo's ==
- AHAF Demo 2005 (self-released, February, 2005)
- AHAF Demo 2007 (self-released, January, 2007)
