= Yeah OK =

Studio album by Not Squares
- Released: December 6, 2010

Professional ratings
Review scores
| Source | Rating |
|---|---|
| Drowned in Sound | 5/10 |
| Hot Press | 4/5 |
| The Irish Times | 4/5 stars |
| Loud and Quiet | 2/10 |
| State | 4/5 stars |

Yeah OK is an album by Not Squares. The album was released on December 6, 2010, by the Richter Collective in the UK and Ireland and by Teto Records in Japan.
