= Volatile (A Hero A Fake album) =

Studio album by A Hero A Fake
- Released: October 28, 2008
- Recorded: The Basement Studios
- Genres: Progressive metal; metalcore
- Length: 40:16
- Label: Victory
- Producer: Jamie King

A Hero A Fake chronology
Volatile (2008)	Let Oceans Lie (2010)

Professional ratings
Review scores
Source	Rating
AbsolutePunk	73%
RockFreaks	4/5 stars
The Interlude at the Wayback Machine (archived November 13, 2008)	3.5/5 stars
King Banana	4/5 stars
Underthegunreview	5/10 stars

Volatile is the debut album by American metalcore band A Hero A Fake, released on October 28, 2008, through Victory Records. A music video for the album's single, I Know I, was produced by Scott Hansen and premiered on MTV2 on February 21, 2009.

== Track listing ==
All lyrics are written by Justin Brown; all music is composed by A Hero A Fake.

No.	Title	Length
1.	"Superwoman"	5:46
2.	"El Gigante"	3:08
3.	"Un Bienvenido Descanso (Interlude 1)"	0:48
4.	"Just Another Number"	3:21
5.	"Altered Beast"	5:00
6.	"F-16"	3:30
7.	"Medieval"	4:03
8.	"I Know I"	4:31
9.	"Sinfonia (Interlude 2)"	0:53
10.	"Terminal"	5:33
11.	"Burden"	3:37
Total length:		40:16

== Personnel ==
A Hero A Fake

- Justin Brown – Vocals
- Eric Morgan – Guitar
- Patrick Jeffers – Guitar
- Lenin Hernandez – Guitar, Vocals†
- Matt Davis – Bass
- Tim Burgess – Drums, Percussion

† filed for name change to Alex Avigliano

Production

- Produced and mixed by Jamie King
- Mastered by Jamie King
- Additional recording by Kit Walters
- Album artwork by Jason Link
- Band photography by Justin Reich
