= The Gaslamp Killer =

Mexican-American DJ and Producer

- Born: William Benjamin Bensussen; November 7, 1982 (age 43); San Diego, California, U.S.
- Genres: Psychedelia; underground hip-hop
- Occupations: Producer; DJ
- Instruments: Turntables; drums; sampler; keyboard
- Years active: 2000–present
- Labels: Brainfeeder; Cuss Records; Finders Keepers; Gaslamp Killer Music
- Website: thegaslampkiller.com

William Benjamin Bensussen (born November 7, 1982), better known by his stage name The Gaslamp Killer, is an American alternative hip-hop producer and DJ based in Los Angeles, California.

== Early life ==
William Benjamin Bensussen was born and raised in San Diego, California. His father, Isaac was a musician born in Mexico City, Mexico. His father shared his love of music and taught him how to whistle at age 5, leading to Bensussen being a whistler as a boy and first getting into music. Bensussen uses whistling often in his music.

Bensussen's taste in music was influenced first by his siblings, then his highschool friends, and later his peers in the music scene. Bensussen cites world music as influential, particularly the music of Turkey, Africa, India, Latin America, and Jamaica. During his teen years, he would explore and hang out in the Gaslamp district, not fitting in with his beach neighborhood with skaters and surfers.

== Career ==
Bensussen started becoming a DJ in the Gaslamp district when he was 17. He was inspired by DJ Shadow.

His sets often ruined the music vibe in the clubs, earning him the nickname "The Gaslamp Killer". The crowd sometimes would verbally and phsycially assault him.

After moving to Los Angeles in 2006, he helped found Low End Theory, "L.A.'s monolithic weekly showcase for uncut beat-driven tracks".

The Gaslamp Killer has played at Coachella Valley Music and Arts Festival, the Austin Psych Fest, the Decibel Festival, and the Voodoo Fest.

He produced Gonjasufi's debut album, A Sufi and a Killer, with Flying Lotus and Mainframe in 2010.

In August 2012, he released a single, "Flange Face" b/w "Seven Years of Bad Luck for Fun", which was listed by Pitchfork as their "Best New Track" of July 2012. His debut album, Breakthrough, was released in September 2012.

In 2015, he released a live album, The Gaslamp Killer Experience: Live in Los Angeles. In 2016, he released a studio album, Instrumentalepathy. In 2020, he released his latest album Heart Math.

In 2017, a woman named Chelsea Tadros accused Bensussen of drugging and raping her and another woman at a party in 2013. Bensussen denied the accusation and sued Tadros for defamation. The accusation led venues such as Low End Theory to stop booking Bensussen and his label, Brainfeeder to disown him. In 2019, Tadros and Bensussen settled their lawsuit and issued a joint statement maintaining that Tadros had been incapable of giving consent, but acknowledging that Bensussen was unaware of Tadros's incapacitation and that the identity of the person who drugged Tadros is unknown.

In 2023, he released a collaboration with the Heliocentrics entitled Legna.

== Personal life ==
Bensussen is Jewish, and his ancestry includes Turkish, Syrian, Lebanese, Mexican and Lithuanian. His great-uncle is activist Herbert Aptheker.

Bensussen was in a scooter accident in 2013, which nearly cost him his life. He lost his spleen and was at one point three hours from death. Due to this outcome, he is no longer able to drink alcohol.

== Discography ==
=== Studio albums ===
- Breakthrough (2012)
- Instrumentalepathy (2016)
- Break Stuff (2019)
- Heart Math (2020)
- Legna (with the Heliocentrics) (2023)

=== Live albums ===
- The Gaslamp Killer Experience: Live in Los Angeles (2015)

=== EPs ===
- The Killer Robots (2008) (with Free the Robots)
- My Troubled Mind (2009)
- Death Gate (2010)

=== Singles ===
- "Impulse" (2010) (with Daedelus)
- "Flange Face" b/w "Seven Years of Bad Luck for Fun" (2012)
- "Brass Sabbath" (2013) (with Jungle by Night)
- "Murder Man" (2015) (with Mophono)
- "Residual Tingles" (2016)

=== Mixes ===
- Gaslamp Killers (2007)
- It's a Rocky Road: Volume 1 (2007)
- It's a Rocky Road: Volume 2 (2007)
- I Spit on Your Grave (2008)
- We Make It Good Mix Series Volume 5 (2008)
- Akuma No Chi Ga Odoru (2009)
- All Killer: Finders Keepers Records 1-20 Mixed by The Gaslamp Killer (2009)
- Hell and the Lake of Fire Are Waiting for You! (2009)
- Vs Finders Keepers (2009)
- A Decade of Flying Lotus (2010)
- Helio x GLK (2013)
- Lavender AM: Meditation Mix (2013)
- 90's Hip Hop Mix (2024)

=== Productions ===
- Flying Lotus - "GNG BNG" from Los Angeles (2008)
- The Beastmaster - Have You Ever Bled from Your Eyes? Do You Want To? (2009)
- Gonjasufi - "Kobwebz" and "Kowboyz & Indians" from A Sufi and a Killer (2010)

== Free the Robots - Free the Robots (2008) ==
- Prefuse 73 - Everything She Touched Turned Ampexian (2009)
- Nocando - "Hurry Up and Wait" from Jimmy the Lock (2010)

=== Compilation appearances ===
- The Change Up EP-V.01 (2006)
- T7L: Audio Promo Disc 707 (2007)
- ArtDontSleep Presents... From L.A. with Love (2007)
- Echo Expansion (2007)
- Secret Hangout (2007)
- Brainfeeder Sampler (2008)
- Warp Records Spring 2008 (2008)
- Stussy x TurntableLab - Beats (2008)
- Dublab Presents: Echo Expansion (2009)
- Choice on 12 (2010)
- Radio Galaxia (2010)
- Low End Theory Podcast (2010)

== Awards and nominations ==
=== Berlin Music Video Awards ===
The Berlin Music Video Awards is an international festival that promotes the art of music videos.

Year	Nominated Work	Award	Result	Ref.
2025	Chaos In The Brain	Best Experimental	Nominated	
