= Let Oceans Lie =

Studio album by A Hero A Fake
- Released: January 19, 2010
- Recorded: The Basement Studios
- Genres: Progressive metal, metalcore
- Length: 60:00
- Label: Victory
- Producer: Jamie King

A Hero A Fake chronology
| Volatile (2008) | Let Oceans Lie (2010) |

Professional ratings
Review scores
| Source | Rating |
|---|---|
| AbsolutePunk | 75% |
| RockFreaks | 7.5/10 stars |
| Decoy Music | 3.5/4 stars |
| review rinse repeat | 4/5 stars |
| Alternative Press | 3/5 stars |
| Sea Of Tranquility | 4/4 stars |
| Apoch's Metal Review | 3/5 stars |
| Rocksound | 7/10 stars |
| Bring On Mixed Reviews | (4.25/5) |
| Blistering | 7.5/10 stars |
| Metal Invader | 4.5/5 stars |
| The Pit | 7/10 stars |
| review rinse repeat | 4/5 stars |

Let Oceans Lie is the second and final album by American metalcore band A Hero A Fake, released on January 19, 2010, through Victory Records. A music video for the album's self-titled single, Let Oceans Lie, was produced by Scott Hansen and premiered on MTV2 on February 13, 2010.

== Track listing ==
All lyrics are written by Justin Brown except on A Year in Passing which was written by Eric Morgan; all music is composed by A Hero A Fake.

| No. | Title | Length |
|---|---|---|
| 1. | "Our Summit, This World" | 3:50 |
| 2. | "Swallowed By the Sea" | 4:32 |
| 3. | "Elk River Falls" | 4:22 |
| 4. | "Sleep State" | 3:33 |
| 5. | "Astronomical" | 5:18 |
| 6. | "Dear" | 6:04 |
| 7. | "Images" | 4:02 |
| 8. | "Let Oceans Lie" | 4:17 |
| 9. | "Eckhart" | 3:53 |
| 10. | "Impart Your Loss" | 5:18 |
| 11. | "A Year in Passing" | 14:45 |
| Total length: | | 60:00 |

== Personnel ==
A Hero A Fake

- Justin Brown – Vocals
- Eric Morgan – Guitar
- Patrick Jeffers – Guitar
- Lenin Hernandez – Guitar, Vocals†
- Matt Davis – Bass, Vocals
- Tim Burgess – Drums, Percussion

† filed for name change to Alex Avigliano

Production

- Produced and mixed by Jamie King
- Mastered by Jamie King
- Additional recording by Justin Brown
- Album artwork by Justin Reich
- Album layout by Jason Link
- Band photography by Justin Reich
