= Just Got Back From the Discomfort—We're Alright =

Studio album by The Brave Little Abacus
- Released: May 29, 2010
- Recorded: 2009–2010
- Genres: Emo; emo revival; midwest emo; math rock
- Length: 44:58
- Label: Self-released

Just Got Back From the Discomfort—We're Alright (stylized in all lowercase on the original release, and sometimes shortened to Just Got Back) is the second and final studio album by American emo band The Brave Little Abacus, released on May 29, 2010. The album was a lo-fi home recording that developed a popular following only after the band broke up and was noted by critics for its varied instrumentation and unorthodox vocals.

== Background and recording ==
Following the release of Masked Dancers in 2009, The Brave Little Abacus quickly began writing their second and final album. Adam Demirjian—the vocalist, guitarist, and drummer for the band—said that they chose to forgo conventional studio recording equipment and record the album at home, as they enjoyed experimenting with sound design rather than being "confined" in a studio environment. The album was self-produced, apart from some mixing work by Demirjian's guitar teacher Eric Clemenzi on a couple of the tracks. The band suffered a computer crash and lost two of the original recordings on the album, replacing them in the final cut with mixdown versions originally used for practice purposes.

Just Got Back implements a multitude of different instruments, including the piano, accordion, glockenspiel, synths, church organs, and different brass instruments, among others. The album also contains several samples from the early 2000s sitcom Malcolm in the Middle. Demirjian described Malcolm in the Middle as important to him growing up, and said he used the samples as a "vehicle" for presenting both his passion for the show and the messages the show conveyed.

The album cover of Just Got Back features a picture taken on Demirjian's parents' honeymoon, which depicts Demirjian's father in front of a gas station.

== Release ==
The band released Just Got Back onto Bandcamp on May 29, 2010. The initial release was not popular; Demirjian said that the Bandcamp album had under 200 downloads some time after it was published. After The Brave Little Abacus broke up in 2012, the album started to develop a cult following, becoming popular on 4chan's /mu/ board and subsequently Reddit.

In October 2020, remastered versions of Just Got Back and Masked Dancers were released on streaming services.

== Critical reception ==
In a review for Sputnikmusic, emeritus user Trebor rated the album 5/5, describing it as "a life changing record... the most underrated, underappreciated classic in all of emo", while also admitting that it is "dicey trying to argue that an album that almost no one has heard is a classic." They also note that the lo-fi production and Demirjian's nasally vocals created a "challenging listen. [Which is why they] are so drawn to it". Thomas Seraydarian included Just Got Back in an "emo primer" for Crossfader Magazine, writing that the album felt "like a math rock record with a much more dominant level of melancholic melody and varied, experimental instrumentation".

Just Got Back came in at number 27 in Spin's ranking of the "30 best emo revival albums". Zoe Camp wrote that due to the varied instrumentation and Demirjian's unique vocals, the album represented a "dispatch from the doldrums" of typical 2000s emo music: "Seven years later, it feels just as unique as ever." Eli Schoop included the album in a list of staff-favorite music releases of the 2010s at Tiny Mix Tapes, describing the album as feeling "straight, undistilled, [and] without restraint". In the 2019 book Perfect Sound Whatever, James Acaster said the album had a "beautifully stitched-together flow to it, full of detailed sound collages".

== Track listing ==
No.	Title	Length
1.	"Pile! No Pile! Pile!"	6:22
2.	"Please Don’t Cry, They Stopped Hours Ago."	4:42
3.	"Boy's Theme"	2:48
4.	"A Highway Got Paved Over My Future, I Drive It Getting to School."	2:34
5.	"The Blah Blah Blahs"	4:14
6.	"Can't Run Away"	6:30
7.	"Untitled (Cont.)"	3:40
8.	"Aubade (Morning Love Song)"	2:13
9.	"It's Not What You Think It Is"	3:39
10.	"Allston, Massachusetts December 2009—January 2010"	1:20
11.	"Bug-Infested Floorboards—Can We Please Just Leave This Place, Now."	4:38
12.	"Orange, Blue With Stripes"	2:13
Total length:		44:58

- Tracks 1, 3, 5, 6, 8, 9, 11, and 12 are stylized in all lowercase on the original release.
- Tracks 2 and 4 are stylized in sentence case on the original release.
- For the 2020 remaster, all unique stylization was removed, as well as all punctuation aside from exclamation points.

Sample credits

- "Pile! No Pile! Pile!" contains samples from Season 7 Episode 14 of Malcolm in the Middle
- "Bug-Infested Floorboards—Can We Please Just Leave This Place, Now." contains samples from Season 3 Episode 6 and Season 4 Episode 2 of Malcolm in the Middle
- "Orange, Blue With Stripes" contains samples from Season 1 Episode 1 of Malcolm in the Middle
- "A Highway Got Paved Over My Future, I Drive It Getting to School." interpolates lyrics from "Nashville" by Liz Phair
