= Past Time (Grass Widow album) =

Studio album by Grass Widow
- Released: 2010
- Label: Kill Rock Stars

Grass Widow chronology
Grass Widow (2009)	Past Time (2010)	Internal Logic (2012)

Past Time is the second album by Bay Area trio Grass Widow, released in 2010. It was their first release on Kill Rock Stars.

The album was written while Hannah Lew, the band's bassist, dealt with the death of her father, leading many of the songs on the album to be focused on death, dying, and grief.

== Reception ==
Pitchfork rated Past Time 6.7/10, describing it as a "solid second album" with "meandering guitars and colorful vocals." The song "Fried Egg" was chosen for NPR's All Songs Considered's list of Top 10 Songs for 2010.

== Track listing ==
All music is composed by Grass Widow.

No.	Title	Length
1.	"Uncertain Memory"	03:18
2.	"Shadow"	03:00
3.	"11 Of Diamonds"	02:55
4.	"Give Me Shapes"	01:49
5.	"Old Disguise"	02:29
6.	"Fried Egg"	03:31
7.	"Landscape"	02:09
8.	"Submarine"	02:54
9.	"Strangers Come"	01:54
10.	"Tuesday"	02:35
Total length:		26:34
