= The Brave Little Abacus =

American indie rock band

- Origin: Sandown, New Hampshire
- Genres: Midwest emo; emo revival; math rock; post-hardcore
- Years active: 2007–2012
- Label: Quote Unquote
- Spinoffs: Interrobang!?; Me in Capris
- Spinoff of: Eggplant Danceoff!
- Past members: Adam Demirjian; Zach Kelly-Onett; Andrew Ryan; Nick Morrone

The Brave Little Abacus (or simply Brave Little Abacus) was an American emo band formed in Sandown, New Hampshire, in 2007. The band consisted of vocalist, guitarist, and drummer Adam Demirjian, bassist Andrew Ryan, and keyboardist Zach Kelly-Onett. They were joined by Nick Morrone on drums in 2011.

Following their break up in 2012, The Brave Little Abacus gained a cult following after their final album, Just Got Back From the Discomfort—We're Alright (2010), renewed interest in online music communities.

== Career ==
The Brave Little Abacus was formed in August 2007 as a spinoff of ska band Eggplant Danceoff!, where Demirjian sang and played guitar.

The Brave Little Abacus first released a demo through Myspace in 2008 titled Demo?. That same year, they released a split titled S/T with fellow New Hampshire musician Matt Aspinwall. In August 2009, the band self-released their first album, titled Masked Dancers: Concern In So Many Things You Forget Where You Are (often shortened to Masked Dancers.)

In May 2010, the band self-released their second and final album, titled Just Got Back From the Discomfort—We're Alright. The album was listed at number 27 on Spin magazine's list of the "30 Best Emo Revival Albums, Ranked". The first track from Just Got Back, "Pile! No Pile! Pile!", was named the most important emo song of 2010 by The Ringer in 2022. The Brave Little Abacus's final release, an EP titled Okumay, was released in 2012 on Quote Unquote Records as a 7-inch vinyl, featuring a cover of the song "Introducing Morrissey" by The Ergs. They played their last show at the Vic Geary Center in Plaistow, New Hampshire, on January 28, 2012.

=== Post-breakup (2012–present) ===
Demirjian and Morrone are currently members of Boston-based power pop band Me in Capris, and Kelly-Onett has pursued a solo career as a modern classical musician. Demirjian is the drummer for Boston-based power pop band Lilith. In recent years, many publications and musicians have cited the Brave Little Abacus as an under-appreciated band.

== Musical style ==
The Brave Little Abacus is commonly associated with the emo, emo revival, and math rock genres, though the band did not identify with any genre while active. Demirjian named the Flaming Lips, They Might Be Giants, Bright Eyes, the Dillinger Escape Plan, Deftones, Bomb the Music Industry!, Laura Stevenson, and Cursive as musical influences for the band, along with microtonal composer Alois Hába, whose works were studied by Kelly-Onett.

The band made extensive use of samples from video games, TV shows, and anime, including Marvel vs. Capcom, Malcolm in the Middle, and Akira. Prior to the addition of a live drummer, backing tracks for live shows were played on CDs using a Dreamcast or PlayStation, which was then plugged into a CRT television. The Brave Little Abacus is also noted for utilizing a wide array of instruments in their songs, including glockenspiel, xylophone, church organ, and euphonium.

=== Influences ===
Shoegaze artist Parannoul listed The Brave Little Abacus as an inspiration on his Bandcamp near the release of his 2021 album To See the Next Part of the Dream.

== Members ==
Former members

- Adam Demirjian – lead vocals, guitars (2007–2012), drums, percussion (2007–2011)
- Zach Kelly-Onett – keyboards, backing vocals (2007–2012)
- Andrew Ryan – bass guitar (2007–2012)
- Nick Morrone – drums, percussion (2011–2012)

Former touring members

- Evan Briggs – guitar, backing vocals (2012)

== Discography ==
=== Studio albums ===
- Masked Dancers: Concern in So Many Things You Forget Where You Are (2009, self-released)
- Just Got Back From the Discomfort—We're Alright (2010, self-released)

=== EPs ===
- Okumay (2012, Cat Dead, Details Later/Quote Unquote Records)

=== Splits ===
- Matt Aspinwall/The Brave Little Abacus (2008, self-released)

=== Demos ===
- Demo? (2008, self-released)
