= Gonjasufi =

American rapper

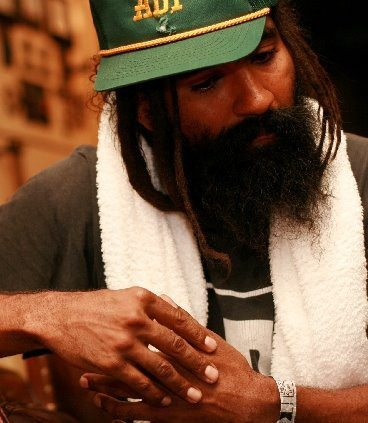
- Gonjasufi in Budapest, Hungary, 2011.

Background information
- Also known as: Sumach Valentine
- Born: Sumach Ecks
- Origin: San Diego, California, United States
- Genres: Hip-hop; psychedelic
- Occupations: Vocalist; rapper; producer; DJ; yoga teacher
- Instruments: Vocals; turntables; guitar
- Years active: 1990s–present
- Labels: Warp; A.I.R.
- Website: www.sufisays.com

Sumach Valentine (born 1978), better known by his stage name Gonjasufi, is an American vocalist, producer, disc jockey, and yogi.

== Life and career ==
Ecks was born in 1978 to a Mexican mother and an American-Ethiopian father. He spent his formative years in Chula Vista, California.

Ecks got involved early on in the arts, playing Helios the Sun God in the opera Persephone.

In the early 1990s, he began releasing music within the San Diego hip-hop scene; notably with the Masters of the Universe crew. Touring under the stage names Sumach Ecks and Randy Johnson, his first band was called Plant Lyphe.

Ecks gained notice from Warp Records in 2008 after an appearance on Californian musician Flying Lotus' album Los Angeles, on which he sings on the track "Testament". His Warp debut album, A Sufi and a Killer, was released March 8, 2010.

Ecks' voice has been described by Pitchfork as "a scraggly, scary, smoked-out croak that creeps like the spiritual offspring of George Clinton and Lead Belly". He attributes his singing style to his day job teaching yoga, where he was forced to learn how to "project from [his] stomach more". His music is largely experimental, fusing urban beats with psychedelic flourishes.

Besides singing and rapping, Ecks also serves as a producer, DJ, and yoga teacher.

On August 19, 2016, Gonjasufi released the album, Callus, which featured contributions from Pearl Thompson.

== Discography ==
=== Studio albums ===
- A Sufi and a Killer (2010)
- MU.ZZ.LE (2012)
- Callus (2016)

=== Remix albums ===
- The Caliph's Tea Party (2010)
- Mandela Effect (2017)

=== EPs ===
- The Ninth Inning EP (2011)
- Untitled (2013) (split with Ras G)

=== Singles ===
- "Holidays" b/w "Candylane" (2009)
- "Kowboyz&Indians" b/w "My Only Friend" (2010)
- "Kobwebz" b/w "Speaketh" (2010)
- "Nickels and Dimes" (2010)
- "Ninth Inning" (2011)
- "The Blame" (2012)

=== Guest appearances ===
- Flying Lotus – "Testament" from Los Angeles (2008)
- The Gaslamp Killer – "I'm in Awe" from Death Gate (2010)
- Humansuit – "Lawnmower Man" from Humansuit (2012)
- The Gaslamp Killer – "Veins" and "Apparitions" from Breakthrough (2012)
- Old English – "The Omen" from Band in Amerikkka (2013)
- Perera Elsewhere – "Giddy" from Everlast (2013)
- Awol One & Gel Roc – "Flight" from The Cloaks (2014)
- Dag Savage – "Bad Trip" from E & J (2014)
- The Bug – "Save Me" from Angels & Devils (2014)
- L'Orange & Mr. Lif – "Strange Technology" from The Life & Death of Scenery (2016)
- The Gaslamp Killer – "Good Morning" from Instrumentalepathy (2016)
- A7pha – "Hater Hate It" from A7pha (2017)
