= Psychromatic =

Studio album by Raintime
- Released: 27 April 2010
- Recorded: 2009
- Genre: Alternative metal; progressive metal; power metal; melodic death metal
- Length: 46:30
- Label: Lifeforce

Raintime chronology
Flies & Lies (2007)	Psychromatic (2010)

Professional ratings
Review scores
Source	Rating
BurnYourEars	7.5/10
Heavymetal.dk	7/10
Metal.de	9/10
Musikreviews.de	10/15
Rockfreaks.net	3/5

Psychromatic is the third and final studio album by Italian melodic death metal band Raintime. It was released on 27 April 2010.

== Track listing ==
1. "Fire Ants" – 4:10
2. "Turned Up and Down" – 3:31
3. "Never Ending Stairway" – 3:29
4. "Nothing but a Mistake" – 3:32
5. "I Want to Remember" – 4:45
6. "Shift" – 3:35
7. "Fake Idols" – 3:50
8. "Beaten Roads" – 4:01
9. "One Day" – 3:27
10. "Buried in You" – 3:56
11. "Walk-on Actor" – 8:14

== Personnel ==
=== Raintime ===
- Claudio Coassin – vocals
- Daniele "Acido" Bressa – lead guitar
- Matteo DiBon – rhythm guitar
- Michele Colussi – bass guitar
- Andrea Corona – keyboards
- Enrico Fabris – drums, percussion

=== Additional personnel ===
- Efis Canu Najarro – vocals on track 4
