= Grass Widow =

American indie rock band from San Francisco

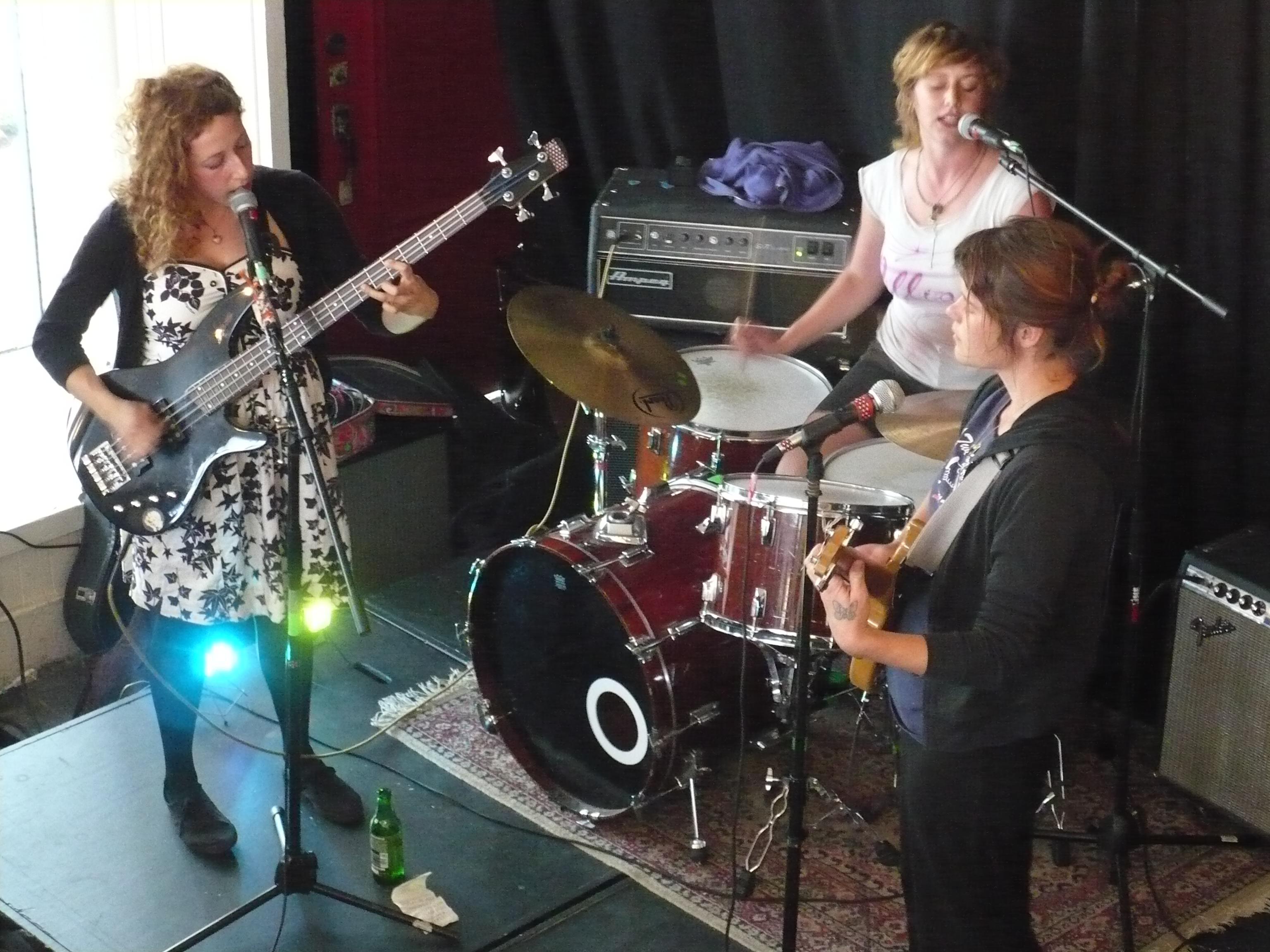
- Grass Widow in 2008

Background information
- Origin: San Francisco, California, USA
- Genres: Indie Rock; noise pop; indie pop
- Years active: 2009–2013
- Labels: Captured Tracks; Kill Rock Stars; HLR
- Past members: Lillian Maring; Hannah Lew; Raven Mahon
- Website: Grass Widow

Grass Widow was an American indie rock band from San Francisco, California. Their music has been described as discordant and lo-fi, and connected to the post-punk roots of the members of the band.

== History ==
Grass Widow was formed in San Francisco in 2007, by former members of the band Shitstorm. Hannah Lew played bass, Raven Mahon played guitar and Lillian Maring played the drums, with all three members sharing vocal duties. The band mentioned in interviews their intentionally collaborative creative process, and their focus on sustainability in their music careers, opting to tour for only two weeks at a time to stay connected with friends and family. Songs were created together in their San Francisco practice space and all members contributed equally to the work of the band.

Their second album, Past Time, was released on Kill Rock Stars in 2010. Their third album, Internal Logic was self-released on their own label, HLR, in 2012.

Members of the band were often asked about the fact that the band is all-women and about their feminism, and have responded with a quote from Gina Birch: "And you ask me if I’m a Feminist? Why the hell would I not be?!" They cited influences like Neo Boys and Kleenex, they also note Roy Wood's The Move and The Kinks as a major source of inspiration.

The band dissolved circa 2013, with members moving on to pursue other projects.

Their namesake term grass widow, shared across Germanic languages, often refers to a promiscuous woman, a wife whose husband is away, or an unmarried mother who claims to be a widow to save her reputation.

== Discography ==
=== Studio albums ===
- Grass Widow (2009, Make A Mess Records)
- Past Time (2010, Kill Rock Stars)
- Internal Logic (2012, HLR label)

=== Other releases ===
- Grass Widow (2009, Captured Tracks)
- Milo Minute 7" (2011, HLR label)
- Disappearing Industries (2012, HLR label)
