= Young Giant =

Studio album by Queens Club
- Released: March 23, 2010
- Genre: Alternative rock
- Length: 38:41
- Label: Tooth & Nail

Queens Club chronology
Nightmarer EP (2009)	Young Giant (2010)

Professional ratings
Review scores
Source	Rating
Allmusic	3/5 stars
Alternative Press	3/5 stars

Young Giant is the lone full-length album from Queens Club. It was released on March 23, 2010. This album contained an equal amount of pre-released material and new unreleased recordings.

== Track listing ==
1. "Are We? Will We?" - 3:22
2. "Issinair" - 3:07
3. "Cutt Me Off" - 2:36
4. "An Apparition" - 3:06
5. "Dust" - 3:34
6. "Less Talk" - 4:05
7. "Lydia" - 2:49
8. "Upstart" - 3:35
9. "Family Ties" - 3:26
10. "Nightmarer" - 2:45
11. "I'm American" - 2:10
12. "Danger Kids" - 4:07

== Credits ==
Queens Club consists of:

- Dan Eaton - singer/ guitarist
- Andy Nichols - guitarist
- Tyler Bottles - bassist
- Jake Ryan - drummer

== Other Info ==
The song "Danger Kids" was used as the theme song for the 2011 racing game TrackMania 2: Canyon.
