= A Sufi and a Killer =

Studio album by Gonjasufi
- Released: March 8, 2010
- Genre: Alternative hip-hop; experimental; psychedelic rock; lo-fi
- Length: 58:49
- Label: Warp
- Producer: The Gaslamp Killer; Flying Lotus; Mainframe

Gonjasufi chronology
A Sufi and a Killer (2010)	The Caliph's Tea Party (2012)

A Sufi and a Killer is the debut studio album by Gonjasufi (Sumach Ecks). It was released by Warp on March 8, 2010. The album was produced by Flying Lotus, The Gaslamp Killer, and Mainframe.

Ecks said of the album: "I didn't want it to be too easy for the listener. I wanted it to hurt a little bit. I wanted it to get into a spot in the head that hasn't been hit". Of its title he said "The Sufi side of life has helped me with my killer side so I try not to attach myself to any label. There's a Sufi and a killer in everybody, man, and I'll be whatever I have to be just to make it through".

== Reception ==
Professional ratings
Aggregate scores
Source	Rating
AnyDecentMusic?	7.5/10
Metacritic	78/100
Review scores
Source	Rating
AllMusic	4/5 stars
Clash	7/10
The Guardian	4/5 stars
The Irish Times	4/5 stars
Mojo	4/5 stars
MusicOMH	4/5 stars
Pitchfork	8.4/10
PopMatters	6/10
Q	3/5 stars
Uncut	3/5 stars

At Metacritic, which assigns a weighted average score out of 100 to reviews from mainstream critics, A Sufi and a Killer received an average score of 78 based on 16 reviews, indicating "generally favorable reviews". At AnyDecentMusic?, which collates critical reviews from more than 50 media sources, the album scored 7.5 points out of 10, based on 18 reviews.

The album garnered much positive critical coverage on its release. AllMusic's Jason Lymangrover gave the album four stars out of five, describing it as "weird, ‘60s-rooted, psychedelic hip-hop", sounding "like if J. Dilla produced George Clinton after visiting with the Dalai Lama, or if Dan the Automator recorded Cody Chesnutt after the two shared a plate of magic mushrooms", and calling it "truly visionary". The BBC described it as "a stunning, genre-transcending record" and "a terrific, trippy adventure". Drowned in Sound gave the album 7/10, describing Ecks' voice as "a hugely versatile instrument, every bit as unique and distinctive as that of Björk or Tom Waits", and calling the album "a fascinating glimpse of a character continually in transition". The Guardian called it "one of the strangest and most eclectic records you'll hear all year", and "an album that practically has a green smog drifting above it". Clash gave it 7/10, stating "repeated plays reveal an irresistible talent". PopMatters gave it 6/10, with reviewer David Amidon stating "I've listened to this album a lot just trying to make sense of it...and have walked away mostly pleased".

A Sufi and a Killer ranked at number 41 on Tiny Mix Tapes' "Favorite 50 Albums of 2010" list. It ranked at number 14 on The Wire's "2010 Rewind" list.

== Track listing ==
All tracks are written by Gonjasufi.

No.	Title	Producer(s)	Length
1.	"Untitled (Bharatanatyam)"	The Gaslamp Killer	0:55
2.	"Kobwebz"	The Gaslamp Killer	2:13
3.	"Ancestors"	Flying Lotus	2:36
4.	"Sheep"	The Gaslamp Killer	4:03
5.	"She Gone"	The Gaslamp Killer	2:45
6.	"SuzieQ"	The Gaslamp Killer	1:44
7.	"Stardustin"	The Gaslamp Killer	1:04
8.	"Kowboyz&Indians"	The Gaslamp Killer	2:43
9.	"Change"	The Gaslamp Killer	2:04
10.	"Duet"	The Gaslamp Killer	3:06
11.	"Candylane"	Mainframe	2:07
12.	"Holidays"	Mainframe	3:57
13.	"Love of Reign"	Mainframe	2:39
14.	"Advice"	Mainframe	2:45
15.	"Klowds"	The Gaslamp Killer	3:28
16.	"Ageing"	The Gaslamp Killer	2:42
17.	"DedNd"	The Gaslamp Killer	3:38
18.	"I've Given"	The Gaslamp Killer	3:35
19.	"Made / Dobermins"	The Gaslamp Killer	10:45
Total length:			58:49

== Charts ==
Chart (2010)	Peak position
Belgian Albums (Ultratop Flanders)	55
Belgian Albums (Ultratop Wallonia)	98
UK Independent Albums (OCC)	33
