= Drenge discography =

Band discography

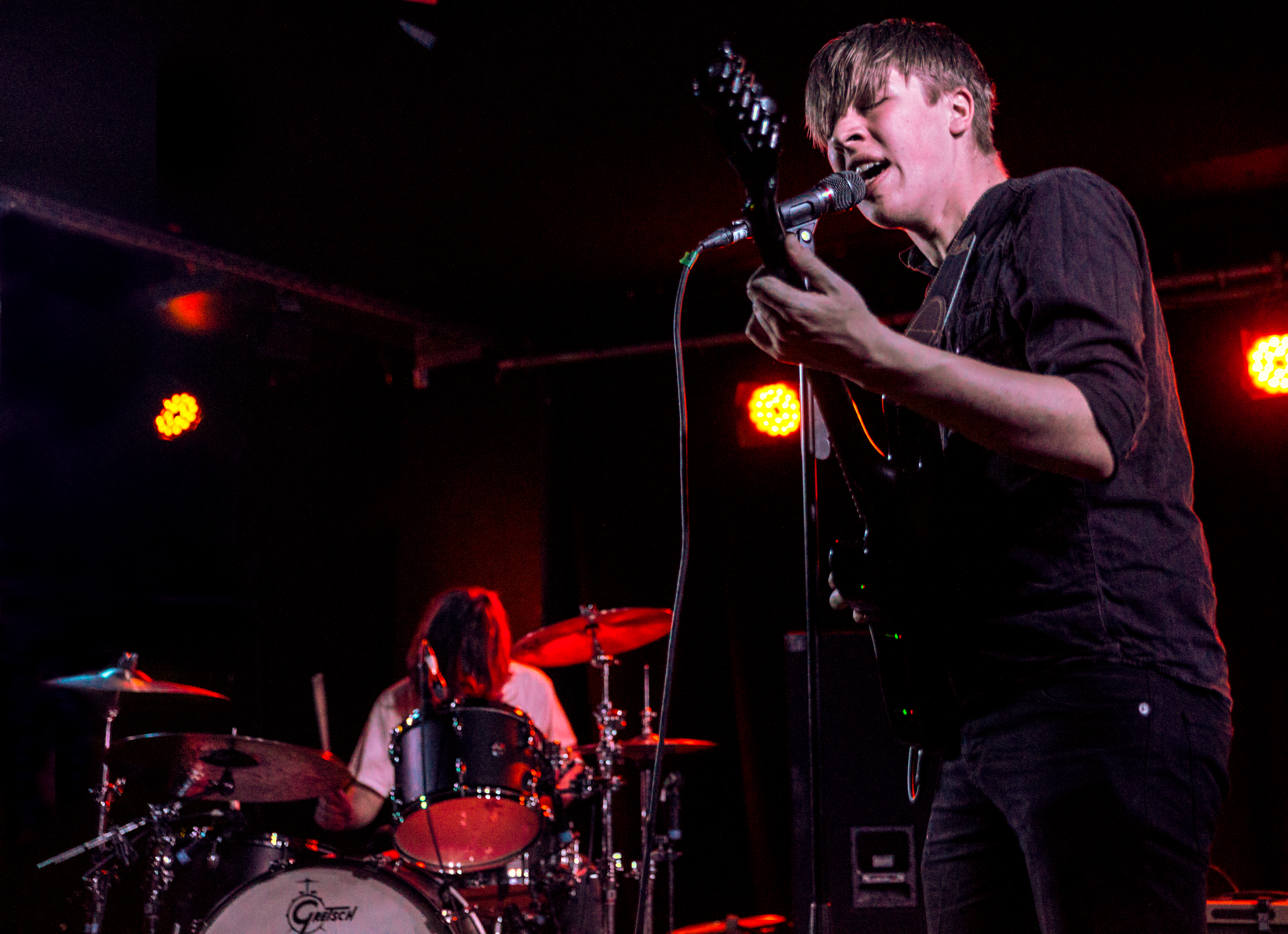
- Drenge performing live in Munich in April 2014
- Studio albums: 3
- EPs: 1
- Singles: 5
- Video albums: 0
- Music videos: 5

Drenge is an English three-piece rock band made up of Eoin Loveless, on guitar and vocals, his younger brother Rory, on drums, and Rob Graham on bass. The brothers grew up in Castleton, Derbyshire, where they formed the band in 2010, relocating to Sheffield in 2014. They have released three studio albums: Drenge in 2013, Undertow in 2015, and Strange Creatures in 2019.

== Albums ==
=== Studio albums ===
List of studio albums, with selected chart positions
Title	Album details	Peak chart positions	
Title	Album details	UK	BEL
Drenge	Released: 19 August 2013; Label: Infectious; Formats: CD, LP, digital download	42	—
Undertow	Released: 6 April 2015; Label: Infectious; Formats: CD, LP, digital download	14	196
Strange Creatures	Released: 22 February 2019; Label: Infectious	52	—
"—" denotes albums that did not chart.

=== Live albums ===
List of live albums
Title	Album details
iTunes Festival 2013	Released: 13 September 2013; Label: Infectious; Format: Digital download

== Extended plays ==
List of EPs
Title	EP details
Autonomy	Released: 5 October 2018; Label: Infectious; Formats: CD, digital download

== Singles ==
- "Bloodsports" (04/03/2013) on Infectious Music

No.	Title	Length
1.	"Bloodsports"	2:31
2.	"Dogmeat"	2:23

- "Backwaters" (17/05/2013) on Infectious Music

No.	Title	Length
1.	"Backwaters"	3:13
2.	"Necromance is Dead"	1:51

- "Face Like a Skull" (19/07/2013) on Infectious Music

No.	Title	Length
1.	"Face Like a Skull"	3:32
2.	"Done Thing"	2:09
