= James Adrian Brown =

English guitarist and songwriter

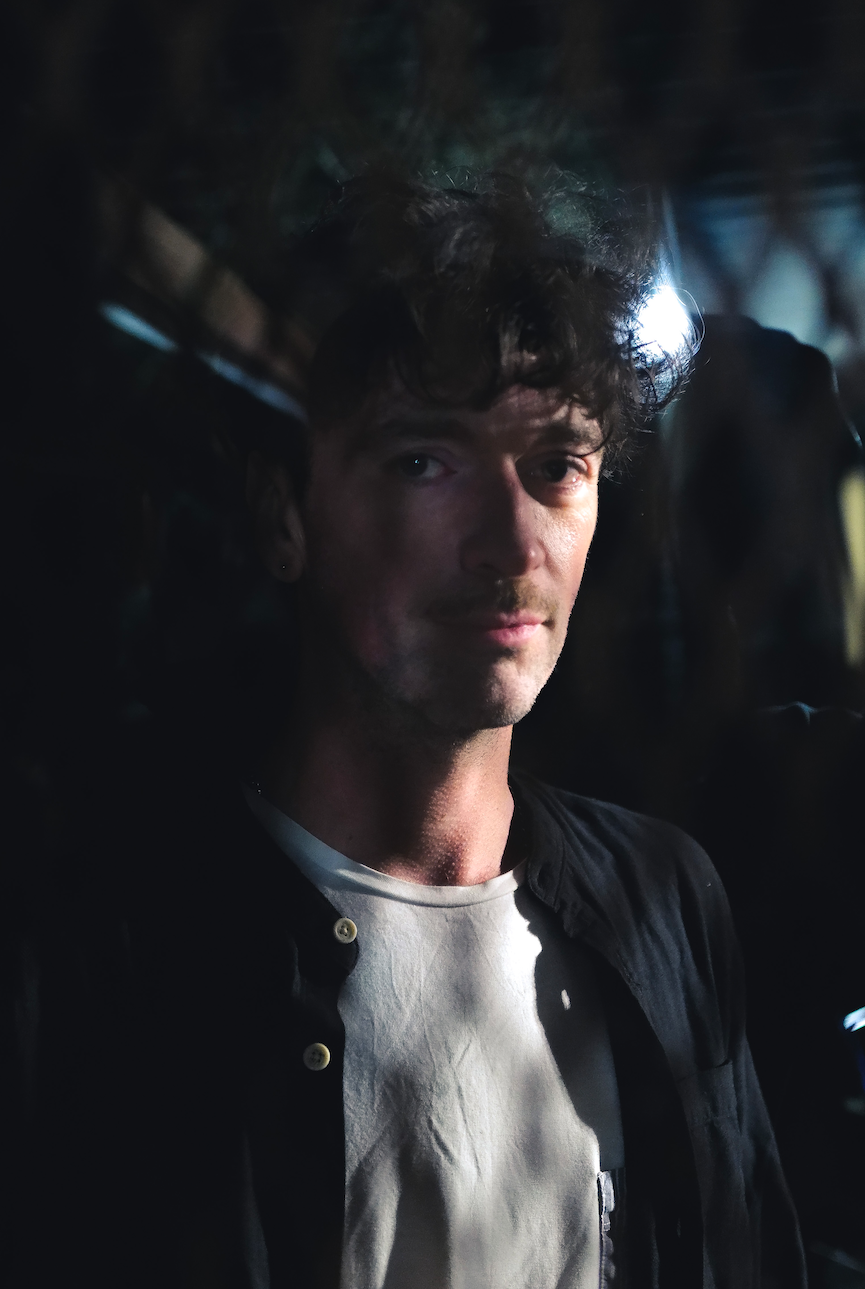
- J A Brown in 2024

Background information
- Origin: Leeds, West Yorkshire, England
- Genres: electronic music, indie rock, alternative rock
- Occupations: Guitarist, composer, songwriter
- Instruments: Guitar, keyboards
- Years active: 2008–present
- Labels: Transgressive, Sony, Caroline International, Universal Music, EMI Music Publishing Invada Records
- Formerly of: Pulled Apart by Horses
- Website: www.jamesadrianbrown.com

James Adrian Brown is an English musician, solo electronic artist, producer, composer and former guitarist and songwriter with the English alternative rock band Pulled Apart by Horses.

== Solo electronic career ==
Brown embarked upon creating electronic compositions during the nationwide lockdown of the UK brought about by the COVID-19 pandemic in early 2020. It was stated this was a way to combat his ongoing mental health issues and to continue creating music. In 2021 the first of these recordings were released by Leeds, West Yorkshire based electronic/ambient record label Analog Horizons.

Brown then later signed to the UK electronic record label Castles In Space in 2023. His first release was a limited-edition 7-inch single There Is Space Under Your Seat. This was followed by the six-track EP Terra Incognita in July 2024, which Brown described as being inspired by his experiences with mental health challenges. In October 2025, he released the single Generator, taken from his debut album, alongside a CD edition featuring remixes and a headline tour of England and Ireland.

Brown released his full-length debut album "Forever Neon Lights" on January 30th, 2026 by Castles In Space. The LP was inspired by Brown's formative memories of regularly visiting the Blackpool Illuminations as a child.

Alongside writing and releasing his own original work, Brown has also remixed tracks by Benefits, Blood Red Shoes, I Like Trains and former Wild Beasts frontman Hayden Thorpe.

== Pulled Apart by Horses ==
Brown formed the band in 2008. They were signed by Transgressive Records in 2009, and released their debut album Pulled Apart by Horses on 21 June 2010. In August 2011, the band went into Monnow Valley Studio in Wales to record with record producer Gil Norton, and their second album Tough Love was released to critical acclaim on 20 January 2012.

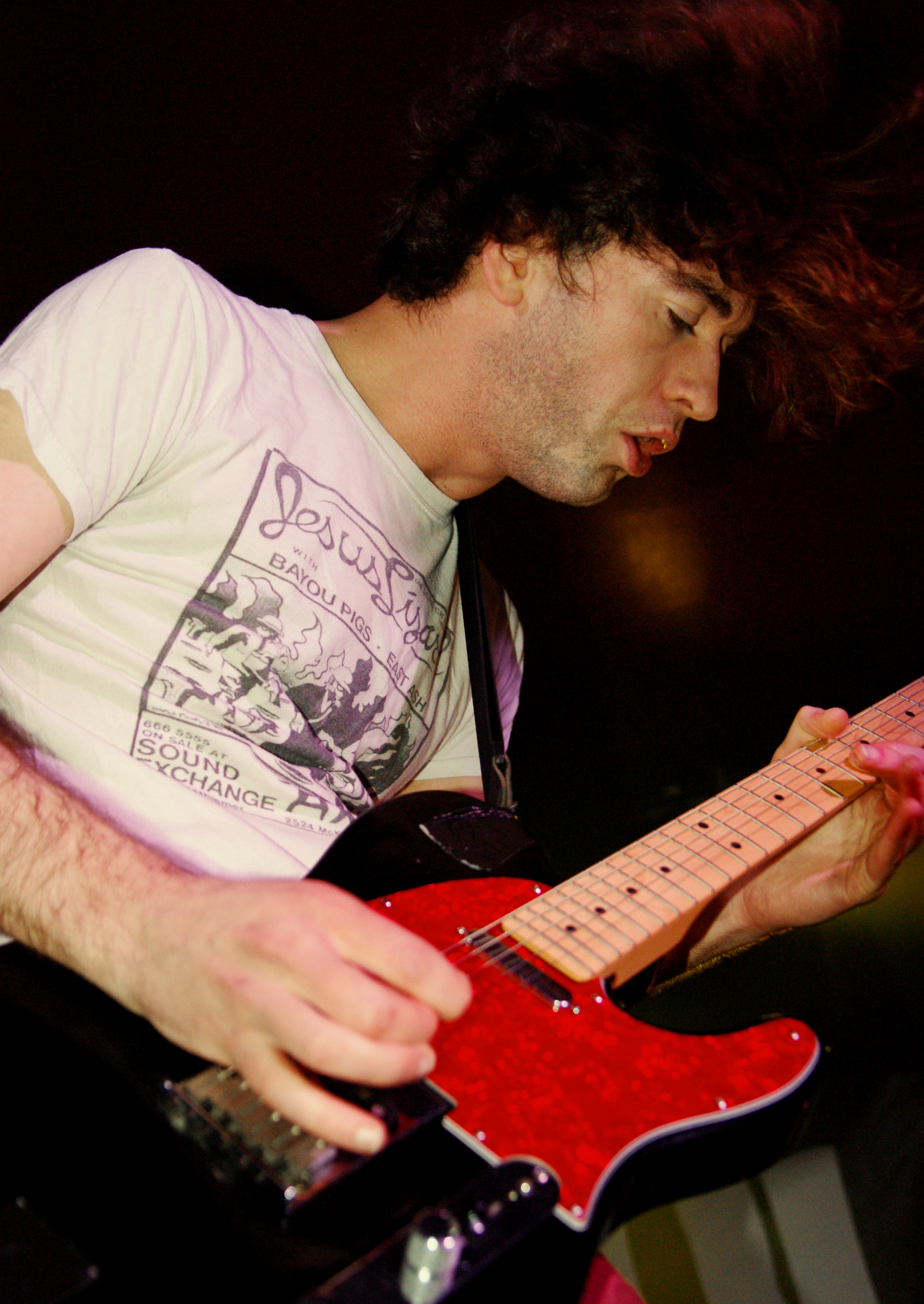
Brown performing in Pulled Apart By Horses

After Tough Love, the band sold out their first European tour, and went on to support Biffy Clyro and Foals. In 2010 they supported Muse at the Manchester County Cricket Ground.

In September 2014 the band's third album Blood became their first top 40, entering the charts at 38. In 2016, Brown and bandmate, Tom Hudson, recorded a take over for Annie Mac and the BBC's Radio 1 in the United Kingdom.

The band's next album, The Haze was released in March 2017 and reached number 12 in the charts.

On 25 May 2022, after 14 years as the band's lead guitarist, the band announced his departure on their Instagram page.

== Other musical projects ==
Since 2017, Brown has been collaborating with the composer Benson Taylor. In 2018 Brown travelled to Beirut, Lebanon to perform with singer songwriter Nadine Shah live and collaborated with her on an original piece of music for a BBC Radio 4 documentary.

2019 saw James begin composing and writing original scores for TV & film alongside his close friend Benson Taylor.

In early 2020 Brown collaborated with Welsh poet and play-wright Patrick Jones, British/Singaporean film director Paul Sng and BBC Radio 1 presenter and DJ Huw Stephens. Their collaboration brought about the creation of a short film titled "Ghosts Of '39" which visually follows in the weary footsteps of the Chartists march during the Newport Rising. Brown composed an original score for the production.

At the beginning of 2021, Brown announced he had begun working on an original film-score for Entropía Cinema. The post-apocalyptic horror film ‘La Ultima Flor del Cerezo’ (The Last Cherry Blossom) directed by Héctor Hernández, was released in 2024 with Brown receiving two awards for his score.

In 2024, Brown completed work as the producer of Constant Noise, the second studio album by Benefits, a British post-punk duo. The album was released in March 2025 by Invada Records to critical acclaim, with NME describing it as "a masterful and measured dose of reality against a void of humanity – and their best work to date."

== Awards ==
Brown received the award for 'Best Original Music Short Film' at the 7 Colors Lagoon, Bacalar International Film Festival in 2023 for his work on ‘La Ultima Flor del Cerezo’ (The Last Cherry Blossom).

== Personal life ==
Brown studied art at college and university for five years in Leeds, UK. He has been a keen gamer since he was a young child. He is a clothing ambassador for the British brand Farah.

In 2012, Brown commented to Clash Magazine what it is like sharing a name with the soul legend, James Brown, "I'll never forget Christmas Day of 2006 when he passed away, I was drunk as a sailor the night before and awoke in the morning to find 26 text messages from friends saying 'R.I.P James' and 'Papa's Got A Brand New Body Bag'. I thought I'd died or something."

== Discography ==
=== James Adrian Brown ===
Title	Release date	Record label	Cat	Formats
To Be In Two Places At Once (Single)	26 October 2021	Analog Horizons	AH003	Digital
Everything Follows (Single)	25 November 2021	Analog Horizons	AH004	Digital
There Is Space Under Your Seat (Single)	31 March 2023	Castles In Space	CiS129	7" Vinyl & Digital
UVB-76 (Single)	23 November 23	Castles In Space	CiS171	7" Vinyl & Digital
Terra Incognita (EP)	19 July 24	Castles In Space	CiS152	12" Vinyl & Digital
Generator (Single & Remixes)	31 October 25	Castles In Space	CiS204	CD & Digital
Forever Neon Lights (Album)	30 January 26	Castles In Space	CiS202	12" Vinyl & Digital

=== Pulled Apart by Horses ===
Title	Album details	Peak chart positions
Title	Album details	UK
Pulled Apart by Horses	Released: 21 June 2010; Label: Transgressive Records; Format: CD, digital download	–
Tough Love	Released: 23 January 2012; Label: Transgressive Records; Format: Vinyl, CD, digital download	67
Blood	Released: 1 September 2014; Label: Sony Music; Format: Vinyl, CD, digital download	38
The Haze	Released: 17 March 2017; Label: Caroline International; Format: Vinyl, CD, digital download	12
"—" denotes album that did not chart or was not released
