= Strange Creatures =

Strange Creatures may refer to:

- Strange Creatures (band)
- "Strange Creatures", song by Jake Bugg from Shangri La
- "Strange Creatures", song by The Undead from Til Death
- Strange Creatures (album), a 2019 album by Drenge
