= Wet Nuns =

English rock band

- Also known as: Wet Nun (2016)
- Origin: Sheffield, West Yorkshire, UK
- Genres: Stoner rock; punk blues; garage rock; hard rock
- Years active: 2009–2013, 2016
- Label: Throng of Nobs
- Past members: Rob Graham; Alexis Gotts

Wet Nuns were an English rock band from Sheffield, South Yorkshire. Formed in 2009 by former Eternal Stench members Alexis "Leki" Gotts (drums) and Rob Graham (guitar, vocals), the band created a tongue-in-cheek fusion of stoner rock and punk rock that parodied the heavy metal subculture. They released only the EP Broken Teeth (2013) and full-length album Wet Nuns (2013), gaining widespread attention from publications including NME, DIY and the BBC, then disbanded in late 2013. Gotts died in 2014. A tribute concert was held for him in 2016, in which Graham performed Wet Nuns songs with a variety of other musicians under the name Wet Nun.

Wet Nuns were foundational to establishing a stoner rock, doom metal and sludge metal scene in Sheffield, by inspiring bands, organising events and bringing touring bands to the city. They also defined a heavy strain of the 2000s blues rock revival, which would go on to be practised by Royal Blood and Drenge.

== History ==
=== Formation and early years (2009–2012) ===
Wet Nuns was formed in 2009 by Alexis Matthew "Leki" Gotts (drums) and Rob Graham (guitar, vocals). The pair had met while playing in the crust punk band Eternal Stench. They formed intending to play grindcore and perform dressed only in a religious habit and leather underwear, but they could not afford the clothes. However, after a few writing sessions, they found they preferred writing blues-based music. In a 2012 interview, they explained their choice of the band name "Wet Nuns" because "that really means something to us. As anyone who follows the band would know we are keen band-name enthusiasts. We cultivate band-names. Wet Nuns is a very rare and valuable breed. Like a delicate lily. Dry Monks is a weed". Other names considered were Groan Feather, Scrote Pagoda, Hammett's Ranch and Spitbubble Cathedral.

On 11 November 2011, they released the single "Heavens Below". It was accompanied by a remixed version by Matt Helders. On 14 January 2012, they released the single "Heavens Below". On 6 February 2012, they released the single "Throttle", accompanied by a music video based on the Guinea Pig film series. They performed at Reading and Leeds Festivals 2012. On 10 September, they released the single "Why You So Cold".

=== Broken Teeth, Wet Nuns and disbandment (2013) ===
On 18 February 2013, they released the EP Broken Teeth, which featured two new songs and two that had already been released. For its release, they founded the record label Throng of Nobs to release their music. Between 25 February and 29 March, they headlined a tour of the United Kingdom. On 30 and 31 March, they organised the festival Detestival, held at Sheffield's Queens Social Club. The lineup included themselves, Hawk Eyes, Black Moth, Hookworms, Temples, Toy, Wolf People, Bo Ningen, John J. Presley, Dry Heaves, Throne, Salem Rages, Blood Sport and Temple of Coke. They performed at South by Southwest 2013. On 9 August, they performed at a Converse-organised show at the 100 Club alongside Pulled Apart by Horses, the Safety Fire and Overkill.

The band announced they would disband in 2013, stating a "four year long joke isn't very funny anymore". On 3 October 2013, they performed one of their final live dates at the Lexington, Islington. On 7 October, they released their self-titled debut album. On 19 October 2013, they performed their final show at Queens Social Club in Sheffield, with support from Royal Blood, Flaming Skulls and Loom. NME noted Alex Turner was in attendence and that it distracted many attendees.

=== Post-breakup and Gotts' death (2014–2016) ===
Detestival 2 was held between 18 and 20 April 2014, with a lineup including Soft Play, Menace Beach, Turbowolf and PINS. Graham joined Drenge as bassist in 2015.

Gotts killed himself on November 2014. On 23 February 2016, On 5 March, Graham released "Spooky Glow (Part 2)", a previously unreleased song he and Gotts had recorded. A tribute show for Gotts was held at O2 Academy Sheffield, where Graham performed with various drummers and guests. The performance was under the singular name "Wet Nun", and support came from Baba Naga, Sievehead, Creedence Clearwater Review and Wolf People. All proceeds from the event were donated to Sheffield & Rotherham Wildlife Trust and Mind.

== Musical style and legacy ==
Critics categorised Wet Nuns' music as stoner rock, sludge rock, punk rock, garage rock, punk blues and hard rock. They incorporated elements of country rock, Americana, electric blues, no wave, punk rock, shoegaze, surf music Rockers' Digest stated they were "falling somewhere between stoner and blues". They self-identified as "power-death-blues-punk"

Wet Nuns performed as a "power duo", featuring only a guitarist/vocalist and a drummer. Their recordings were often lo-fi. and their music incorporated driving rhythms and fuzzy riffs. Wet Nuns performed tongue-in-cheek parodies of the heavy metal subculture. When performing live they would often put on American accents and claim to be from Sheffield, Alabama.

The Independent described their music as "Taking the Sabbath dirge of Kyuss with a pinch of the Tarantino energy of the Jim Jones Revue they created obtuse death blues with is more Black Mirror than Black Keys". 405 called it "a bastardised Black Keys, only more interested in turning the volume up and forcing their dirty riffs and guttural vocals upon you". The Line of Best Fit described them as "the bluesy cousins of fellow Yorkshiremen Pulled Apart by Horses; they preserve that band’s keen sense of fun, but lay the same crunchingly heavy guitars over more typical blues structures". NME called their sound "aiming squarely for the Pulled Apart by Horses school of 300mph relentless energy", while Clash called it "blues reconfigured by cavemen". Fortitude magazine called them "Rasping, slovenly guitar mates bareback with unwashed drums, the vocals sounding for all the world like Danzig’s rotgut cousin, 50’s slapback pushing the old school dials to maximum."

=== Legacy ===
Wet Nuns were widely influential, helping to establish a doom metal, stoner rock and sludge metal scene in Sheffield, by organising their own festival Detestival and bringing doom bands such as Conan to the city. Counterfeit magazine credited them with having "dirtied up" the 2000s blues rock revival.

Critics have noted their influence on Royal Blood. They have been cited as an influence by Drenge and the Violet May. In an article for Pitchfork, Brown Brogues listed Wet Nun's album as their favourite album of 2013.

== Members ==
- Rob Graham – guitar, vocals
- Alexis "Leki" Gotts – drums

== Discography ==
Studio albums

- Wet Nuns (2013)

EPs

- Broken Teeth (2013)
