= Bloodsport (disambiguation) =

A blood sport is a category of sports or entertainment that causes bloodshed.

Blood Sport or Bloodsport may also refer to:

== Film and television ==
- Bloodsport (film), a 1988 martial arts film starring Jean-Claude Van Damme
- Blood Sport (TV film), a 1986 American television film spinoff of T. J. Hooker
- "Blood Sports" (The Professionals), a 1980 episode of the crime-action drama series
- "Bloodsport", a 1999 season 2 episode of Batman Beyond

== Music ==
- Bloodsport (album), a 2002 album by Sneaker Pimps, or its title track
- Blood Sports (album), a 1984 album by Avenger
- Bloodsports (album), a 2013 album by Suede
- "Bloodsports", a 2013 song by Drenge from Drenge
- "Bloodsport", a song by KMFDM and Tim Skold from Skold vs. KMFDM
- "Bloodsport", a song by Mobb Deep from Hell on Earth
- "Blood Sport", a song by English rock band Sleep Token from Sundowning
- "Bloodsport '15", a song by Raleigh Ritchie from You're a Man Now, Boy

== Other uses ==
- Bloodsport (character), a DC Comics supervillain
- GCW Bloodsport, a series of professional wrestling events produced by Game Changer Wrestling
- Blood Sport, a Hardy Boys Casefiles novel
