= Drenge =

Drenge may refer to:

- Boys (1977 film), a 1977 Danish film, originally Drenge
- Drenge (band), a band formed in 2011 in Castleton, Derbyshire
  - Drenge (album)
