= Benson Taylor =

English composer and producer (born 1983)

Benson Taylor FRSA
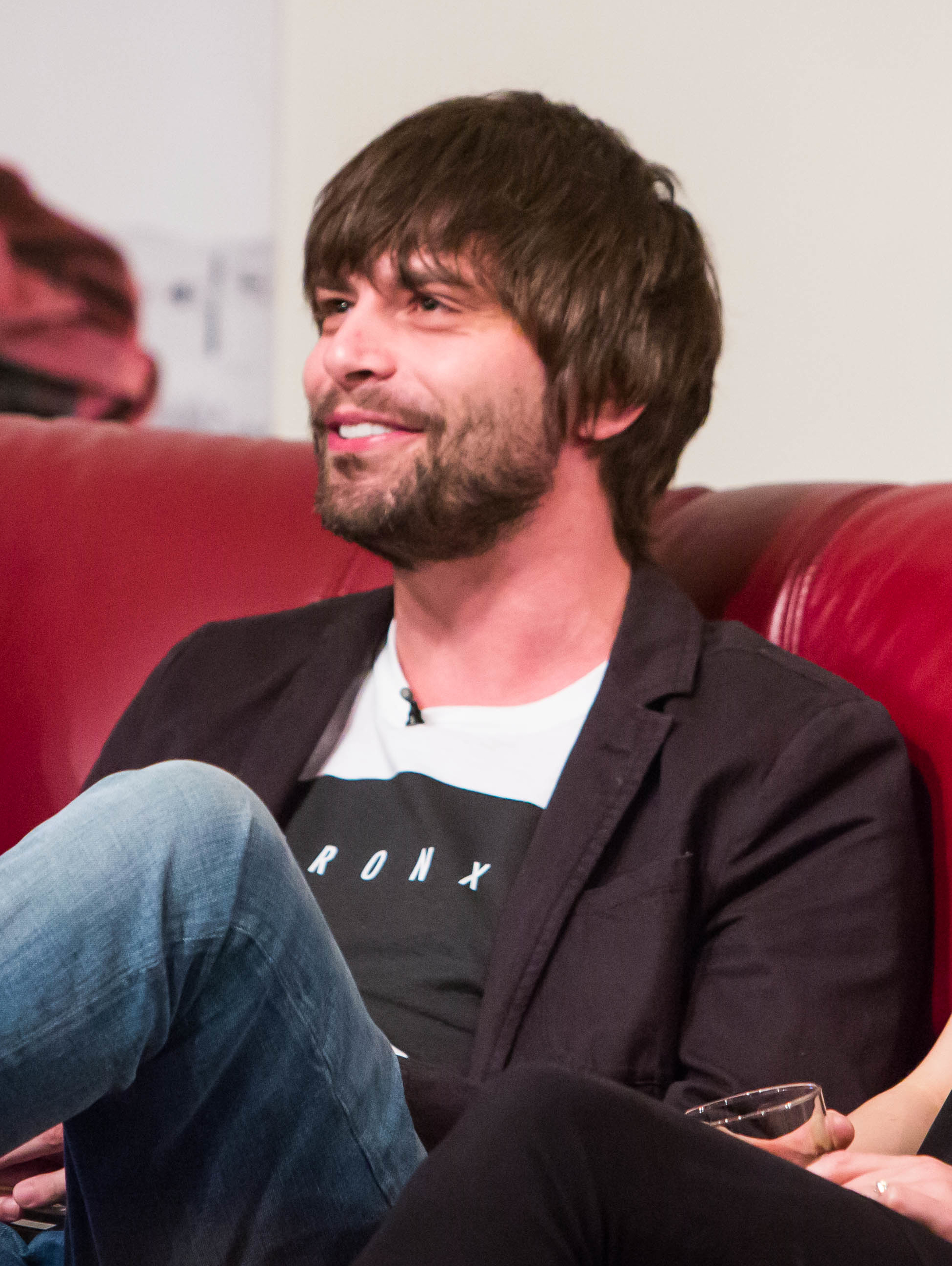
- Taylor in 2014
- Born: Mark Davison; 10 September 1983 (age 43); Bradford, West Yorkshire, England
- Education: University of California, Los Angeles
- Occupations: Composer, songwriter, remixer, DJ, record producer, label owner
- Children: 2
- Musical career
- Genres: Ambient, classical, film score, electronic, dark ambient, hip hop, Post-industrial, experimental music, alternative rock
- Instruments: Trumpet, piano, synthesizers, music sequencer, drum machine
- Years active: 2009–present
- Labels: Decca, Universal Music, EMI Music Publishing, Warner Music Group, Sony/ATV
- Website: bensontaylor.com

Benson Taylor FRSA (born Mark Davison) is an English composer, songwriter, record producer, and humanitarian. He is best known for his music in The Big Bang Theory, Orange is the New Black, London Fields, and the eighth highest-grossing Mexican film of all time The Perfect Dictatorship. In November 2016, Taylor was awarded an honorary doctorate for services to humanitarian causes and music.

He founded A Remarkable Idea in 2017, a sub label of Universal Music, located in Santa Monica, California & London. Taylor has collaborated with, and produced a range artists for the label, including MOBO-winning jazz quartet Kairos 4Tet, The Halle Orchestra, Mercury Prize-nominated Maxïmo Park and Kele Okereke, Bloc Party, Good Charlotte's Billy Martin, Pulled Apart by Horses, Robot Koch, Lack of Afro, Benoît Pioulard, Freddie Cowan, Bo Ningen, James Brown, and Menace Beach.

Taylor won the "Best Original Music" award at the 2014 Monaco International Film Festival. In 2018, he scored and produced the music to Mathew Cullen's thriller adaptation of the Martin Amis novel, London Fields, starring Billy Bob Thornton, Amber Heard, Jason Isaacs, Cara Delevingne, Theo James and Johnny Depp. In 2020, he scored the music for the film, Chick Fight, starring Bella Thorne, Alec Baldwin, and Malin Akerman. He co-wrote original songs with Bones UK and he served as the film's executive producer.

Taylor is a goodwill ambassador for the UK aid agency CAFOD, part of Caritas Internationalis, and a goodwill ambassador for the Cambodian Children's Trust. He is patron of the British-based charity, Music and the Deaf. Taylor was appointed the first ambassador of the Leeds Conservatoire in the United Kingdom.

He is a resident DJ on Los Angeles based radio station Dublab, and a guest DJ on NTS Radio in London.

== Life and career ==
Born in Brontë Country, Bradford, Taylor later studied composition at the University of California, Los Angeles. After UCLA, he mentored with American composer, Mark Mancina, and studied privately with orchestrator, Hummie Mann. His style of music has a British influence, often working a classic film score sound amongst electronics, and other musical settings.

He began writing music at a young age as a trumpet player. Whilst working as a jingle producer at Key 103 in Manchester, England he opened a studio producing scores for American television, including Two and a Half Men, 30 Rock, 90210, and The Big Bang Theory, as well as producing music for the Super Bowl between 2010 and 2014. Taylor's music has been widely used across international advertising campaigns, including Nissan in 2017, McDonald's in 2018, Jose Cuervo's 2015 campaign and a collaboration in 2011 with CeeLo Green for the Las Vegas Tourist Board.

In 2011, Taylor made his London West End theatre debut co-composing the electronic music for Derek Bond's production of the play Many Moons.

In June 2013, music publishers Fairwood Music announced that they had added Taylor to their roster of artists which includes David Bowie, U2, The Selecter, Cat Stevens, The Average White Band, Bob Marley, and J.J. Cale. Taylor told British magazine Music Week, "I'm extremely humbled to join their roster, amongst some of the most recognised talents in the world. Here's hoping some of it will rub off on me!"

In November 2014, Taylor was a Grand Juror at the Tallinn Black Nights Film Festival alongside director Tomasz Wasilewski.

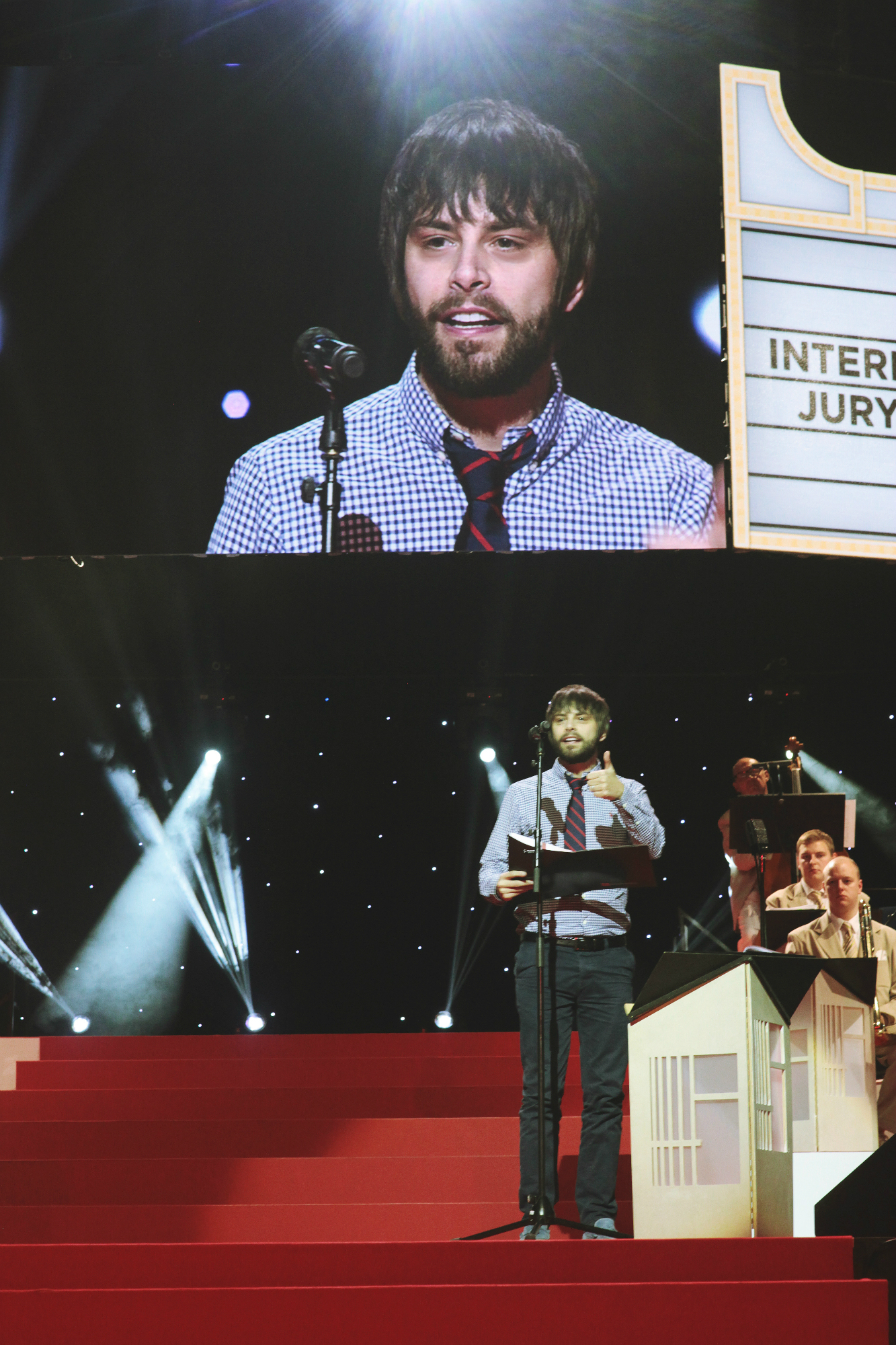
Taylor presenting "Best Actor" to Eddie Redmayne at Pöff in Tallinn in 2014.

In 2016, Taylor produced soundtracks for US talk shows, including, Late Night With Seth Meyers and Jimmy Kimmel Live. He has twice contributed music to the Netflix produced series, Orange Is the New Black. Taylor's music has also appeared in the sixth series of Justified, the first series of How to Get Away with Murder, the second series of Ray Donovan, and in the 2015 Kroll Show.

Taylor scored and produced the music to Mathew Cullen's thriller, London Fields in 2015, starring Billy Bob Thornton, Theo James, Cara Delevingne, Amber Heard and Johnny Depp. Due to legal problems between the director and producers, the film was not released until September 2018, three years after Taylor had finished the musical score. As well as writing the musical score, Taylor collaborated with Toydrum and Bat for Lashes to cover Patsy Cline's "Walkin' After Midnight", and also with James Bagshaw from the British band Temples, covering "How Do You Sleep" from John Lennon's Imagine album, both tracks were recorded specifically for the film.

In December 2021, Taylor's music was performed live by an orchestra and the Italian Mayor of Florence, Dario Nardella, in a returning Christmas tradition celebrating the city and its residents. The concert took place in the Salone Dei Cinquecento in Florence's Palazzo Vecchio.

In September 2023, Taylor collaborated with Los Angeles-based electronic artist Daedelus under the moniker Tuscan Junk Food. The duo released the project Fourth Third Twenty Three, marking Taylor's move into experimental electronic music outside scores.

Taylor is a professional member of the British Academy of Songwriters, Composers and Authors. He was styled as the "New Sound of Hollywood" by MovieScope magazine in its 24th issue in 2011.

Taylor has a monthly show on the Los Angeles-based Dublab, and he is a guest DJ on NTS Radio in London.

== Business ventures ==
In 2017, Taylor established A Remarkable Idea, a music label based in Santa Monica in Los Angeles, and in London. The label produces music for film, television and video games. Taylor has collaborated with artists for A Remarkable Idea including The Halle orchestra, Maxïmo Park and Kele Okereke of Bloc Party, Pulled Apart by Horses, Robot Koch, Lack of Afro, Kairos 4Tet, Bo Ningen, Good Charlotte's Billy Martin, and ambient artists such as Benoît Pioulard. Taylor co-founded, Insidious Music, which is now defunct since 2015 after being acquired.

Taylor frequently records with the British orchestra, The Hallé, and they regularly perform his works in concert. As part of his commercial recordings in 2015, he developed a short term education programme for students.

== Personal life ==
Taylor splits his time between Tuscany, Yorkshire, and Los Angeles. He is married and has two children, who have dual citizenship in both the United Kingdom and Italy.

His third great-grandfather, George Davison, was the maternal uncle of John D. Rockefeller, the founder of Standard Oil. Taylor is Roman Catholic.

== Humanitarian and activism work ==
Taylor supports several charities globally, including and was one of the founding committee members of the homeless charity Emmaus Bradford in West Yorkshire, England. He is also a goodwill ambassador for the Cambodian Children's Trust in Battambang, which works towards freeing children from severe poverty, and alongside the Cambodian government to end orphan tourism. Taylor is the patron of the charity, Music and the Deaf, based in Britain.

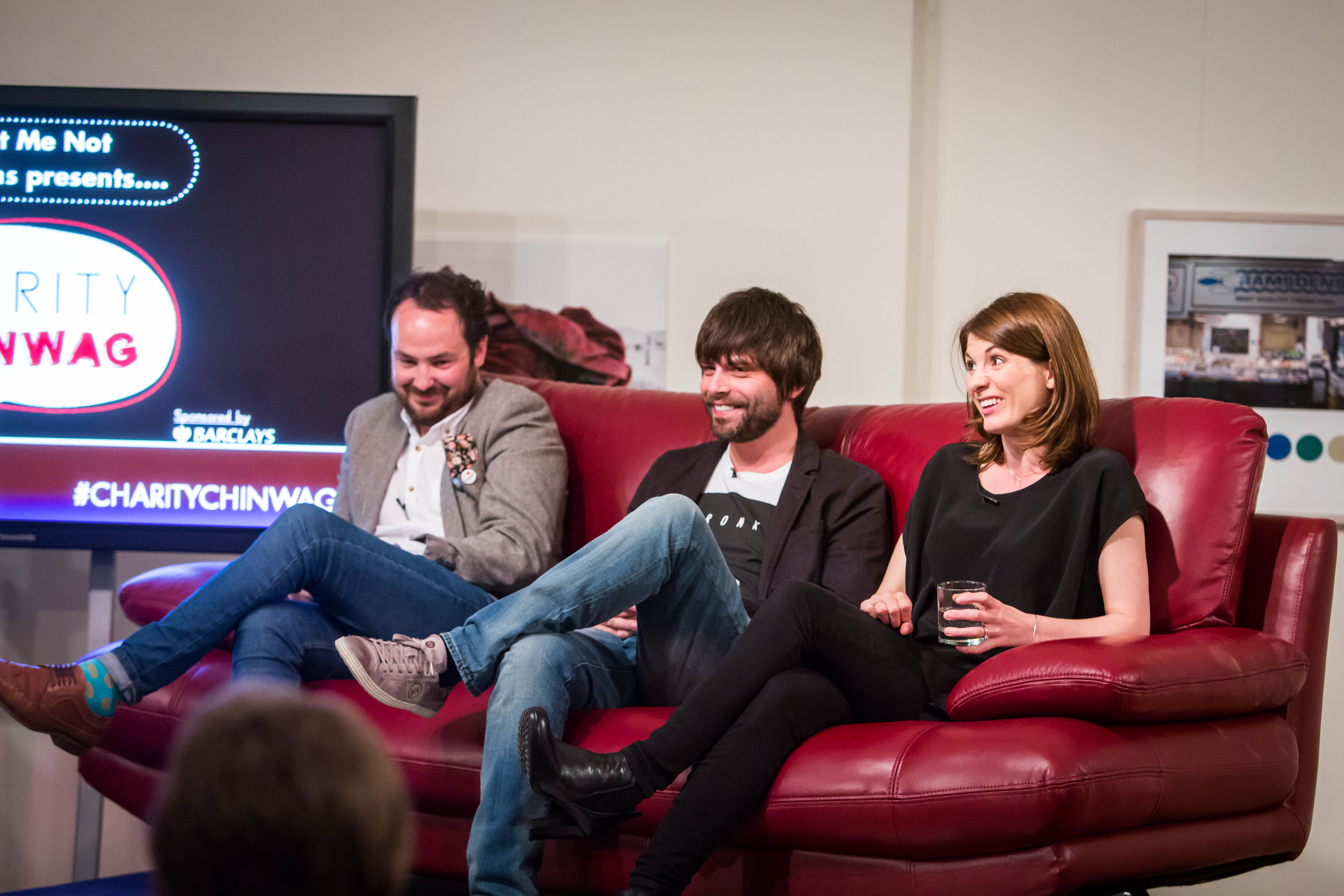
Taylor being interviewed with newscaster Nina Hossain, reality TV star Matthew Burton and Doctor Who actress Jodie Whittaker, at the Forget Me Not Children's Hospice Charity Fundraiser in 2014.

He is an ambassador for the international aid agency for the catholic church, CAFOD, working to raise global awareness and fight poverty and injustice in communities across Africa, Asia and Latin America.

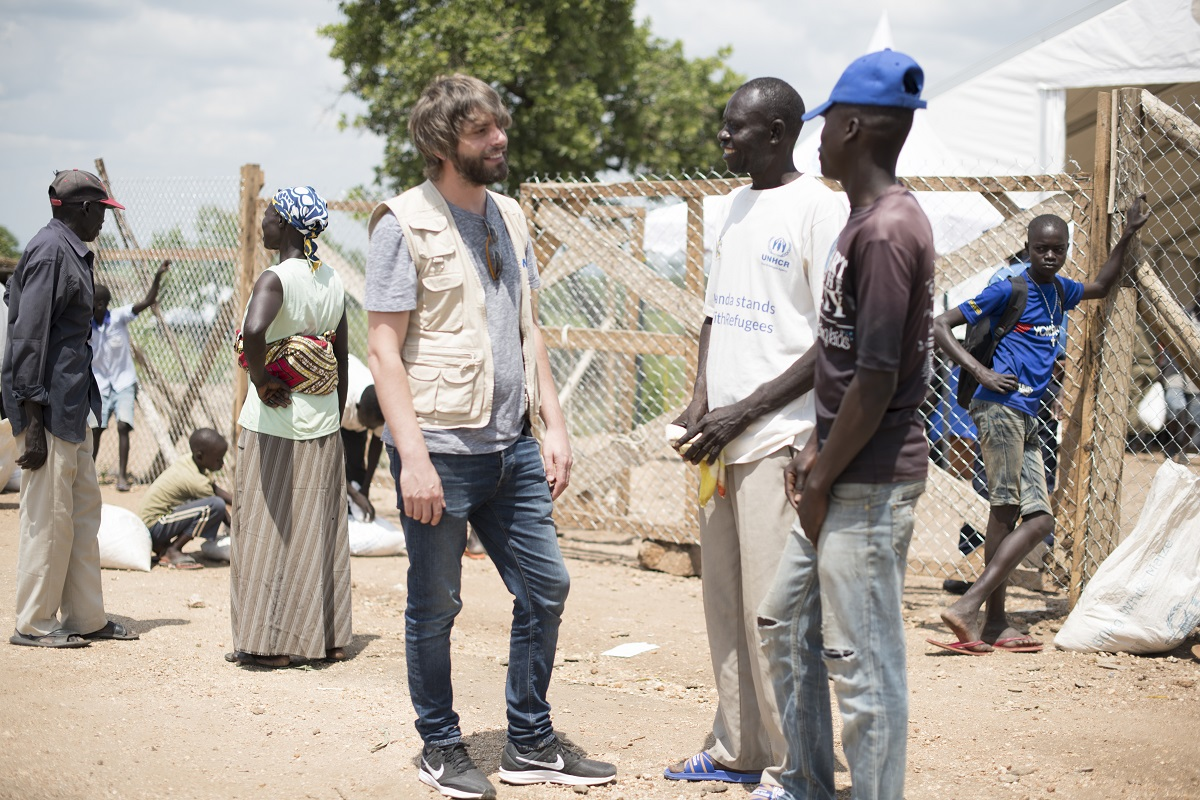
Taylor speaking with South Sudanese refugees at the Bidi Bidi Refugee Settlement in Uganda with the United Nations World Food Programme.

Taylor is a known supporter of the NGO Médecins Sans Frontières, and the United Nations Refugee Agency, producing music to support their awareness campaigns. He has worked alongside the World Food Programme for several years promoting zero hunger in Syria, Lebanon, Jordan, Cambodia, and on the African continent. In June 2018, he travelled to the Bidi Bidi Refugee Settlement in Uganda with the WFP to raise awareness for World Refugee Day. Whilst in Uganda, he worked alongside refugee musicians from South Sudan.

On 26 June 2018, Alzheimer's Research UK released an educational film produced by Aardman Animations. The film was narrated by Simon Pegg and the music was produced by Taylor. It went viral the morning of its release after being shared by the British actor Stephen Fry, former British prime minister, David Cameron, Jeff Bridges, Richard Branson, film director Ron Howard and actors Andy Serkis & Bryan Cranston.

=== Recognition and honors ===
In 2014, Taylor became a fellow of the Royal Society of Arts in London, and in November 2016 was also honoured with an honorary degree from University of Bradford for his services to humanitarian causes.

In 2016, he was appointed the first ambassador of the music conservatoire, Leeds College of Music in the United Kingdom.

== Musical works ==
=== Film scores ===
Year	Title	Role	Director	Studio(s)
2007	Brooklyn Rules	Composer (Additional Music)	Michael Corrente	Southpaw Entertainment; The Weinstein Company
2009	Hellbilly 58	Composer (Additional Music)	Russ Diaper	Sledge Films
2010	Cocaine Saints	Composer	Matt Reiker	Reiker Respect Entertainment; Miramax
2014	Fear of Water	Composer	Kate Lane	KL Dream Pictures; M4West Media
2014	Dark House	Composer	Victor Salva	Charles Agron Productions; Paladin
2014	The Perfect Dictatorship	Composer	Luis Estrada	Bandidos Films
2018	London Fields	Composer	Mathew Cullen	Muse Productions; Lionsgate
2020	You See Me	Composer	Gray Hughes	Ridley Scott; Scott Free Productions
2021	Chick Fight	Composer; Executive Producer	Paul Leyden	Yale Productions; Idiot Savant Pictures

=== Recent TV scores ===
Year	Title	Role	Director	Studio(s)
2013	The Big Bang Theory	Composer: Additional music	Mark Cendrowski	Chuck Lorre Productions; Warner Bros. Television
2013	Super Bowl XLVII	Composer: Additional music	Mike Arnold	CBS Sports
2013	Orange Is the New Black	Songwriter	Michael Trim	Lionsgate Television; Tilted Productions
2014	Super Bowl XLVIII	Composer: Additional music	Hamish Hamilton	Fox Sports
2014	Justified	Composer (Song)	Tucker Gates	The Mark Gordon Company
2014	Ray Donovan	Composer (Song)	Michael Dinner	FX Productions; Timberman-Beverly Productions; Nemo Films
2014	How to Get Away with Murder	Songwriter	Laura Innes	ShondaLand; ABC Studios
2015	Kroll Show	Composer	Jonathan Krisel	Good At Bizness Inc.
2016	Luke Cage (TV series)	Writer "Getting Lost"	Paul McGuigan	Netflix; Marvel Television
2017	Grey's Anatomy	Writer "Time"	Geary McLeod	ShondaLand
2017	Suits	Songwriter "Nippit"	Maurice Marable	NBCUniversal
2017	Young Sheldon	Composer	Michael Zinberg	Chuck Lorre Productions; Warner Bros. Television
2018	13 Reasons Why	Composer; Songwriter "Let It Go"	Michael Morris	Paramount Television; Netflix
2018	Maniac	Songwriter	Cary Fukunaga	Anonymous Content; Netflix
2019	Succession	Songwriter	Kevin Bray	Warner Bros. Television
2019	Broad City	Composer (Song)	Abbi Jacobson	Paper Kite Productions; Comedy Partners
2019	1994	Songwriter "Question Everything"	Stefano Accorsi	Sky Italia; Sky Cinema 1
2019	Deep Water	Songwriter "Lonely Lately" by Maxïmo Park"	Jim Loach	ITV
2021	One of Us Is Lying	Songwriter "If I Could"	Sophia Takal	Universal Content Productions
2022	Alice in Borderland	Composer (Songs)	Shinsuke Sato	Netflix
2023	The Bear	Songwriter "Immortal"	Christopher Storer	FX Productions

=== Video games ===
Year	Title	Role	Studio(s)
2009/10	CSI: Deadly Intent	Additional Music Composer	CBS Television Network; Ubi Soft

== Awards and honors ==
In November 2016, Kate Swann awarded Taylor with an honorary doctorate from the University of Bradford for his services to music and humanitarian causes, making him the youngest person to date to receive the award.

Taylor was honoured with a Fellowship of the Royal Society of Arts in 2015.

He won Best Original Music for his score to Fear of Water at the 2014 Monaco International Film Festival as judged by film director Roland Joffé.

Year	Work	Category	Festival/Event	Results
2014	Fear of Water	Best Original Music	Monaco International Film Festival	Won

== See also ==
- List of English people
- List of soundtrack composers
- List of ambient music artists
- List of people from Bradford
