= Hellbilly 58 =

- Promotional poster for Hellbilly 58
- Directed by: Russ Diaper
- Written by: Russ Diaper
- Produced by: James G. Robinson
- Starring: Russ Diaper; Thomas Fisher; Peter Iasillo Jr; Lloyd Kaufman; Kim Sønderholm; Christa Campbell
- Cinematography: Ian Hylands
- Edited by: Russ Diaper
- Music by: The Pumpkin Philharmonic; Benson Taylor
- Distributed by: Sledge Films
- Release date: 31 October 2008
- Country: United Kingdom
- Language: English

Hellbilly 58 is a 2008 horror film directed by Russ Diaper about A Murdered Hillbilly returns from the dead to seek revenge on the town that put him to death in 1958.

== Cast ==
- Dave Diaper as Mayor Hilton
- Clayton Fussell as George
- Clayton Fussell as Bobby
- Daniel Bennett as Historian
- Peter Iasillo Jr as Banner
- David Francis as Kate
- Daryl Winter as Reporter Jen
- Christa Campbell as Reporter Trisha Borden
- Debbie Rochon as Deputy Fred Cravens
- Michael C. Williams as Jack Kaufman
- Lloyd Kaufman as Julie
- Kim Sønderholm as Trent

== Production ==
The development of the film started in September 2006. Hellbilly 58 was inspired by the song of the same name that was released by the band Blazing Haley in their album Sleeper. Director Russ Diaper asked Blazing Haley, the songwriter of HellBilly58 and the band's front man Matt Armor for the rights to use the song, Armor also plays the role of Hank in the film.

HellBilly 58 was filmed in 5 different locations. These Locations included London and Southampton, Hampshire both located in England; Siegen, North Rhine in Westphalia, Germany; and New York City, New York. The also utilized stock footage of New York City.

== Release ==
Hellbilly 58 was released worldwide on 1 February 2009.
