= Dublab =

Non-profit internet radio station

dublab
- Type: Public radio network
- Country: United States
- Availability: Global
- Founded: 1999
- Owner: Future Roots, Inc.
- Key people: Mark McNeill; Alejandro Cohen, Matthew McQueen, Jake Viator & Diego Herrera
- Official website: dublab.com

dublab is a non-profit music public broadcasting internet radio station based in Los Angeles. They have also been involved with art exhibitions, film projects, event production, and record releases. These shows are archived and downloadable on the dublab website. dublab also broadcasts on KLDB-LP on 99.1 FM in Los Angeles. dublab was founded in 1999 by Jonathan Buck, Mark McNeill and fellow students from KSCR Radio at the University of Southern California.

Their name is a portmanteau of dubbing and laboratory for the combined meaning: a place of experimenting with sampling music. Examples of this, besides their stream, is their film production Secondhand Sureshots where they gave producers, such as Daedelus, five dollars to buy albums from thrift stores and sample the music to create new tracks. Another in audio/visual form is Into Infinity a collaboration with Creative Commons. It is a group art exhibition of around a hundred vinyl record sized circular artworks and more than a hundred eight-second audio loops. The works are randomly dubbed together and is all made freely available for others to remix and sample, even on the project's website.

In January 2008, dublab formed a non-profit umbrella corporation Future Roots, Inc. The name comes from their characteristic style of mixing traditional music, such as folk, with electronic sounds. It also refers to the paradox that often music that is actually really old can sound very much like it was made in the present. In that theme, dublab will often only be written as either all lowercase or all uppercase by those familiar with the collective. There are other such characteristic writing styles such as a heavy use of alliteration.

Much of dublab's funding comes directly via listener support, with other funds generated through grants, Underwriting spots and event production. Their sound system and DJs have been featured at; MOCA, LACMA, Art Center College of Design, Barnsdall Art Park, CalArts, Page Museum/La Brea Tar Pits, The Getty Center, Disney Hall, UCLA, Hammer Museum, Hollywood Bowl, and El Rey Theatre.

They also have extended to releasing records such as; In The Loop series, Summer, Freeways, Echo Expansion and Light from Los Angeles. They record many Sprout Sessions at their studio in Los Angeles, which are released via their Live at dublab Podcast. These have made their way to record releases such as the Feathers Sprout Session. In August 2008 they released their performance video project called Vision Version, which is available as an RSS feed. They also have music-themed group art shows such as Into Infinity, Dream Scene, Up Our Sleeve, and Patchwork.

== Resident DJs ==
- Ale (Languis/Pharaohs)
- Andres Renteria (Poo-bah)
- Anenon (Non Projects)
- Anthony Valadez (Record Breakin/KCRW)
- Beatie Wolfe
- Benson Taylor
- Carlos Niño (Ammoncontact/Life Force Trio)
- Cooper Saver
- Daedelus
- Danny Holloway (Ximeno Records/Blazing 45s)
- Derelict
- Discotchari (Silk Road Secret Agents)
- EDJ
- Farmer Dave Scher (All Night Radio/Beachwood Sparks)
- Friends of Friends
- Frosty (Adventure Time/Golden Hits)
- Ganas (Mas Exitos)
- Gay Felony
- Greg Belson (Divine Chord Gospel Show/45's of Fury)
- Hashim B (Disques Corde)
- Heidi Lawden
- Hoseh (Headspace KXLU)
- Induce (Induce's Listening)
- Jake Jenkins
- Jeff Weiss [POW Radio]
- Jen Ferrer
- Jimmy Tamborello (Dntel)
- Katie Byron (Golden Hits)
- Kutmah (Poo-Bah)
- Lovefingers (ESP Institute)
- Low Limit (Icee Hot)
- Lucky Dragons
- Mahssa (Finders Keepers)
- Mamabear (Sweaterfunk)
- Marco Paul
- Maria Minerva
- Marion Hodges (Hungry Beat/KCRW)
- Matthewdavid (Leaving Records/Brainfeeder)
- Mean Mr. Mustard (Soul Fire Funk Club)
- Michael Stock (Part Time Punks)
- Morpho (The Masses)
- Nanny Cantaloupe (Golden Hits/KXLU)
- Nobody (Blank Blue/Low End Theory)
- Ras G (Poo-Bah)
- Rani de Leon (Soul in the Park, Radio Afrique)
- Slow Motion DJs
- Sodapop (Anticon)
- Suzanne Kraft (Discothèque Records)
- Take (Innercurrent)
- Teebs (My Hollow Drum)
- T-Kay (KSPC)
- Tommy DeNys (Kraak)
- Turquoise Wisdom (Biggest Crush)

== Notable guests, artists, and DJs ==
- Daedelus
- Flying Lotus
- Benson Taylor
- Holy Fuck
- Mia Doi Todd
- Danny Holloway
- Lucky Dragons
- Dntel
- DJ Z-Trip
- Capes
- Smaze
- Kozyndan
- Andy Votel
- Figurine
- Why?
- Stevie Jackson
- Animal Collective
- Ariel Pink
- Baby Dee
- Busdriver
- Cluster
- Cut Chemist
- Dan Deacon
- Robert Woodrow Wilson
- Allee Willis
- J Rocc
- Keith Fullerton Whitman
- Kyp Malone (TV on the Radio)
- Nobukazu Takemura
- Smegma
- Tom Brosseau
- Terry Callier
- Thomas Fehlmann
- Devendra Banhart
- Morton Subotnick
- Marshall Allen
- Damo Suzuki
- Matmos
- Four Tet
- Mouse On Mars
- Dungen
- Saul Williams
- Peter Hammarstedt
- Erlend Øye
- The One AM Radio
- Lavender Diamond
- Manuel Göttsching
- Trickfinger (John Frusciante)
- V. Vale
- Dustin Wong
