= High Five, Swan Dive, Nose Dive =

Single by Pulled Apart by Horses

from the album Pulled Apart by Horses
- B-side: "Somersault" (Sky Larkin cover)
- Released: September 6, 2010
- Recorded: 2010
- Genre: Alternative rock, indie rock
- Length: 2:54
- Label: Transgressive Records

Pulled Apart by Horses singles chronology
"Back to the Fuck Yeah" (2010)	"High Five, Swan Dive, Nose Dive" (2010)	"Yeah Buddy" (2010)

"High Five, Swan Dive, Nose Dive" is the second single from the Leeds four-piece, Pulled Apart by Horses's self-titled debut album. It was released on September 6, 2010. The single features a cover of fellow Leeds band, Sky Larkin's song, "Somersault" from their debut album The Golden Spike as a B-side. The song has received praise from Radio 1, where it has been placed on its B-list and has been Jo Whiley's Record of the week on her show.

== Track listing ==
1. "High Five, Swan Dive, Nose Dive" – 2:54
2. "Somersault" (Sky Larkin cover)

== Music video ==
The video was filmed and released in mid-August 2010. The band is playing in an empty swimming pool, which is intercut of scenes of the band dressed as the character from the album artwork. The band, then dressed as skull-masked characters proceed to destroy the instruments that the band were playing with, and set off flares. The instruments shown in the video were donated by fans of the band.

== Personnel ==
- Tom Hudson – vocals, guitar
- James Brown – guitar
- Robert Lee – bass guitar
- Lee Vincent – drums, percussion
