= Constant Noise =

Studio album by Benefits
- Released: 21 March 2025
- Length: 50:59
- Label: Invada
- Producer: James Adrian Brown; James Welsh

Benefits chronology
Nails (2023)	Constant Noise (2025)

Singles from Constant Noise
- 1. "Land of the Tyrants" Released: 17 September 2024; 2. "Relentless" Released: 13 November 2024; 3. "Missiles" Released: 24 December 2024

Constant Noise is the second studio album by Benefits, a British post-punk duo composed of vocalist Kingsley Hall and instrumentalist Robbie Major. It was released on 21 March 2025 by Invada Records, in various formats including vinyl, CD, cassette and digital download.

== Background ==
Consisting of fourteen songs ranging between one and six minutes each, Constant Noise succeeds the duo's 2023 debut project, Nails. Described as incorporating synths, disco, and themes of mortality, grief, and the political state of the United Kingdom, the album was produced and mixed by James Welsh and James Adrian Brown. In an interview with NME, Hall referred to the work as "an angry album" referencing their own anger and rage.

The first single of the album, "Land of the Tyrants", features singer Zera Tønin and was released on 17 September 2024. "Relentless", featuring The Libertines singer and guitarist Pete Doherty, was released as the second single on 13 November 2024. The third single, "Missiles", was released on 24 December 2024.

== Reception ==
Professional ratings
Aggregate scores
Source	Rating
Metacritic	90/100
Review scores
Source	Rating
Beats Per Minute	81%
Clash	8/10
DIY	4.5/5 stars
God Is in the TV	9/10
The Line of Best Fit	9/10
Louder Than War	5/5 stars
Record Collector	4/5 stars
The Skinny	4/5 stars
Tom Hull – on the Web	B+
Uncut	9/10

Louder Than War described Constant Noise as a "confidently eclectic beast; effortlessly moving from floor-shaking beats to ambient soundscapes." The Quietus remarked: "In contrast to the blunt acrimony of 2023's Nails, Constant Noise seeks a dark euphoria through the nuanced interplay of light and shade to address collective trauma." Clash Magazine referred to it as "a subdued yet persistent diatribe against misinformation and war, commentating on the tangled state of British politics," and rated it eight out of ten.

British magazine The Skinny assigned a rating of four out of five for the album, noting: "On their latest album, Constant Noise, Benefits shift between EDM, techno, rave and bleak, apocalyptic sonic wastelands." Los Angeles-based online publication Beats Per Minute gave the album a rating of 81% and commented: "Anger is an energy, but it needs to be euphoric, collective, and righteous if it is to have value beyond the moment. Constant Noise is all of these things." The album received a nine-out-of-ten rating from English magazine The Line of Best Fit, which stated: "With this album, they've crafted something that is still powerful, vital and confrontational, but balanced between fury and finesse."

NME called the album "a masterful and measured dose of reality against a void of humanity – and their best work to date." Rating the album four and a half stars, Sarah Jamieson of DIY Magazine noted that "it's an album that's vast in scope – both musically and lyrically – with the unhinged moments of their debut pulled back in favour of more dance-orientated elements."

== Composition ==
"Land of the Tyrants" was noted as an electronica song criticizing public servants and apathy in the United Kingdom. It was compared to "Star Guitar" by the Chemical Brothers due to similarities in rhythm. "The Victory Lap" features a club instrumental and centers on the theme of a collective mindset within the British nation, while "Terror Forever" was stylistically described as containing elements of jazz. "Blame" infuses electronic music and was musically compared to the styles of Leftfield and Underworld. "Missiles" features a spoken word commentary about the war in Gaza, and "Lies and Fear" integrates lo-fi music, blast beat, and the musical style of Nails.

== Track listing ==
Constant Noise track listing
No.	Title	Length
1.	"Constant Noise"	3:05
2.	"Land of the Tyrants" (featuring Zera Tønin)	3:06
3.	"The Victory Lap"	4:16
4.	"Lies and Fear"	1:47
5.	"Missiles"	5:49
6.	"Blame"	3:51
7.	"Continual"	3:03
8.	"Divide" (featuring Shakk)	5:42
9.	"Relentless" (featuring Pete Doherty)	3:59
10.	"Terror Forever"	1:03
11.	"Dancing on the Tables"	3:14
12.	"Everything Is Going to Be Alright"	3:52
13.	"The Brambles"	3:34
14.	"Burnt Out Family Home"	4:38
Total length:		50:59

== Personnel ==
Credits for Constant Noise adapted from Bandcamp:

- Kingsley Hall - Lyrics, Vocals, Composer
- Robbie Major - Composer, Synths, Violin, Lyrics
- Hugh Major - Guitar
- James Adrian Brown – production, mixing
- James Welsh – production, mixing
- James Trevascus – mastering
