= 4Tet =

4Tet or 4 Tet can refer to:

- Kairos 4Tet, a British jazz quartet
- Four Tet, an English electronic musician
