= Music and the Deaf =

- Founded: 1988. Building discovery in 1855.
- Founder: Paul Whittaker OBE
- Type: Not-for-profit
- Purpose: Deafness
- Location: Halifax, England
- Region served: United Kingdom
- Website: www.matd.org.uk

Music and the Deaf is a national and international charity based in the United Kingdom. It was founded in 1988 by deaf musician Dr Paul Whittaker, OBE to provide musical opportunities and access for children and adults who live with any degree of hearing loss. Since 2015 the charity has been helmed by Danny Lane, both a profoundly deaf musician and artistic director.

British composer, Benson Taylor, is the incumbent patron.

== History ==
Music and the Deaf is a charity nationally and internationally claiming to provide musical opportunities and access for children and adults who live with any degree of hearing loss. The charity was founded in 1988 by Dr Paul Whittaker, OBE, himself a profoundly deaf musician. Now led by Artistic Director Danny Lane, following Paul's resignation in 2015, the charity continues to build an international reputation for pushing the boundaries of what deaf people can aspire to and achieve in music.

Since 2007, Music and the Deaf has run the Deaf Youth Orchestra of West Yorkshire, and has been developed nationally from 2010. The charity is one of only eight flagship organisations within "Sing Up" providing opportunities for both deaf and hearing people to learn to sing and sign. The people whom work with the youth deaf community are highly specialized and experienced in working with people with hearing loss. Music and the deaf has done many of projects throughout its time. Some projects include; The deaf youth and orchestra project, Frequalise and the 4ORTE ensemble. Many workshops have also been promoted to gain support for the deaf community and this non profit organization. Some facts gained from the workshops are; few of the 45,000 deaf children in the UK have access to music education. Also, around 85% of deaf children integrated into mainstream education over recent years.
