= Strange Creatures (band) =

Filipino alternative dream-pop band formed in January 2013

The Strange Creatures
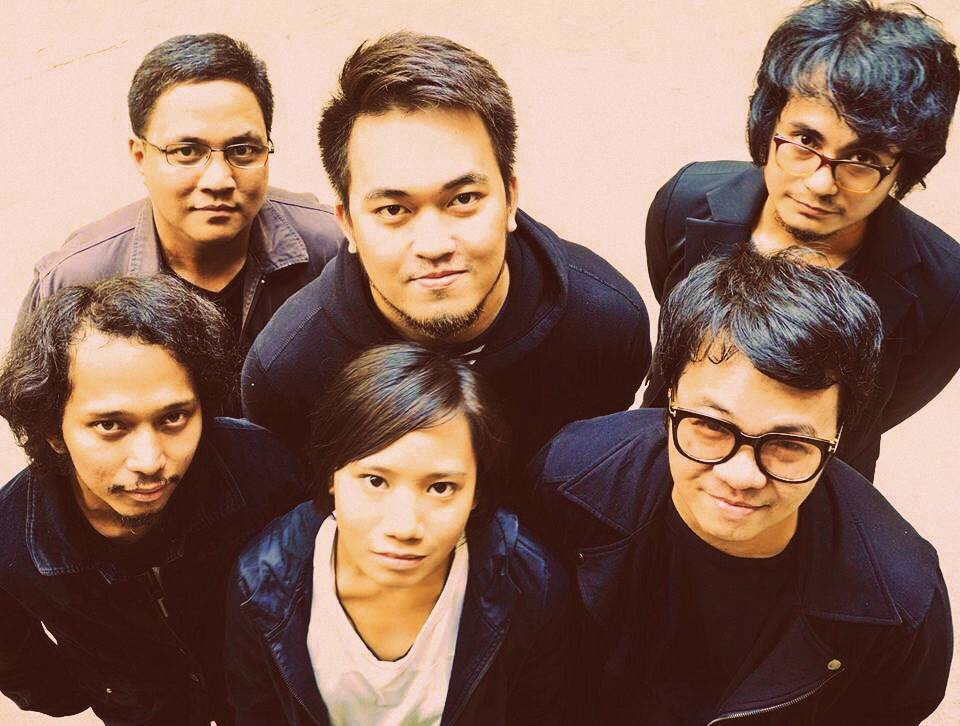
- The Strange Creatures at Redverb Studios

Background information
- Origin: Manila, Philippines
- Genres: Indie Pop
- Years active: 2013–present
- Labels: Terno Recordings
- Members: Jon Tamayo; Megumi Acorda; Tobit Rubio; Bam Butalid; Tan Evangelista; Ryan Rillorta

The Strange Creatures is a Filipino alternative dream-pop band from Manila, formed in January 2013. The band currently consists of vocalist Jon Tamayo, keyboardist Megumi Acorda, bassist Bam Butalid, drummer Ryan Rillorta, and guitarists Tan Evangelista & Tobit Rubio.

== History ==
Formerly known as “The Charmless Man and his Strange Creatures” the original group was led by singer-songwriter Jon Tamayo and Tobit Rubio.

== Releases ==
The Strange Creatures was featured at the South East Asia (SEA Indie) and Kuala Lumpur’s TimeOut Magazine. In 2014, they have distributed their debut EP Stargazer in the UK-based Dufflecoat Records.

In April 2013, they released their first Single entitled, "Stargazer". The song became an internet hit in the Philippines and received positive reviews from several music blog sites. It was also included in SEA Indie and Manila based music blog site, Vandals On The Wall’s pan-Asian indie compilation, ERASING MEMORIES: A Vandals On The Wall x SEA Indie Mixtape.

In February 2014, they released their second single, "I Feel Like I'm On Drugs" which caught the attention of an alternative radio station in Manila (Jam 88.3) and charted in their weekly Top Ten. They were also featured in a Malaysian-based music and pop culture magazine, Time Out Kuala Lumpur. In a short period of time, the band were able to release a couple of singles. "Despite Everything" is about the struggles of a long-distance relationship, another song called "Moonstruck", like its predecessors, is well-acclaimed by listeners and critics around the music circuit. In the same year, Stargazer EP was born. It is a collection of their early songs and singles sans Moonstruck. The album is distributed by an American independent record label, Jigsaw Records, available for download in digital form

The Strange Creatures won the Wanderband 2015. By winning this competition, they were able to play the Wanderland Music Festival and share the stage with international acts such as Youngblood Hawke, The Jungle Giants, Augustana, and Kid Cudi.

In October 2018, the band had their dual album launch with Maude for their 10-track album entitled Phantasms at 19East Bar & Grill Muntinlupa. They are currently under independent record label Terno Recordings, together with some of the known bands in the country like, Up Dharma Down and Radioactive Sago Project.

== Members ==
- Jon Tamayo – vocals, guitars
- Tobit Rubio – guitars
- Megumi Acorda – vocals, keyboards
- Tan Evangelista – guitars
- Bam Butalid – bass guitar
- John Jason Rodriguez – drums

== Former Members ==
- Ryan Rillorta – drums
- Stephanie Coojacinto – vocals, keyboards
- Jimbo Cuenco – drums
- Aleph – vocals

== Discography ==
=== Phantasms (Album) ===
1. Moonstruck
2. Palipad Hangin
3. Stargazer
4. Into Serenity
5. I Feel Like I'm On Drugs
6. Mananatili
7. Nostalgia Blues
8. Dreamy Eyes
9. Ocean Child
10. Azure Sky

=== Stargazer EP ===
1. Stargazer
2. Despite Everything
3. I Feel Like I’m On Drugs
4. I Don’t Want To See Your Face Again
5. The Shire

=== Singles ===
1. Moonstruck (28 March 2016)
2. Palipad Hangin (5 May 2016)
