= Benefits (band) =

British noise punk band formed in 2019

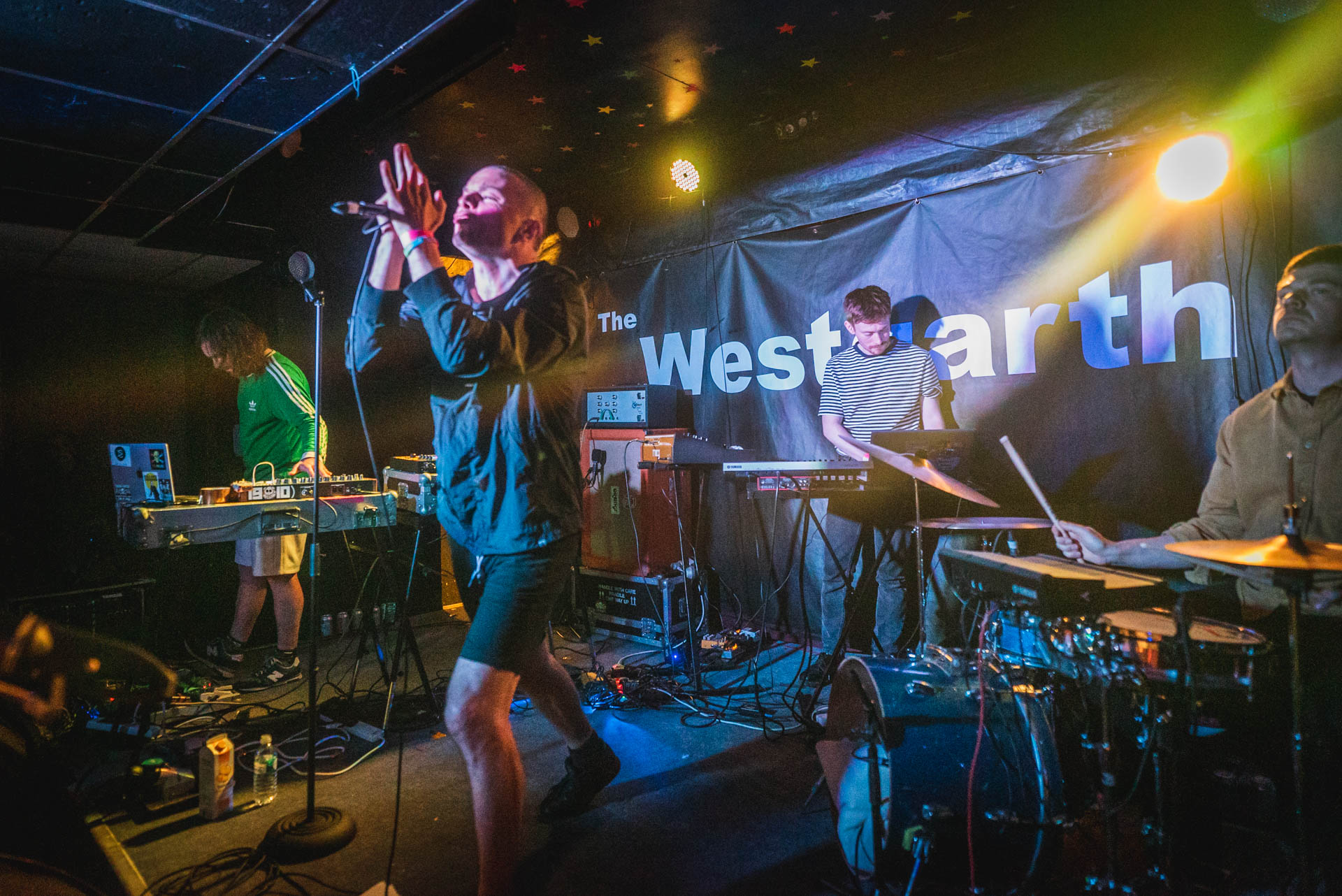
- Benefits

Background information
- Origin: Teesside, England
- Genres: Noise punk, electronic, industrial
- Years active: 2019–present
- Label: Invada Records
- Members: Kingsley Hall – vocals, lyrics, composer; Robbie Major – composer, electronics, synthesizers
- Website: benefitstheband.com

Benefits are a British noise punk band formed in 2019 in Teesside, England. The group is noted for its politically charged lyrics and a fusion of punk, electronic, and industrial music.

== History ==
Benefits were formed by vocalist Kingsley Hall—formerly of The Chapman Family—and multi-instrumentalist Robbie Major. The band began releasing music independently during the COVID-19 pandemic.

Their debut album, Nails, was released in April 2023 on Invada Records and received positive critical reception for its urgent sound and social commentary.

In 2025, Benefits released their second album, Constant Noise, also through Invada. The album expanded their sonic range, incorporating elements of electronic dance music and rave, while retaining their politically motivated lyrical focus.

== Musical style and themes ==
Benefits’ music combines aggressive electronic instrumentation with spoken-word vocals. Their lyrics often address political disillusionment, social inequality, and the decline of post-industrial Britain. The band have been described as a “noisy, visceral issues-based collective” by The Guardian.

== Live performances ==
The band is known for intense live performances featuring Hall's commanding stage presence and Major's confrontational instrumentation. In 2023, they made their debut at Glastonbury Festival, appearing on the Leftfield Stage.

In 2025, Benefits implemented affordability measures including a £12 ticket price cap and early show curfews to accommodate working-class audiences and those dependent on public transport.

A 2025 live performance at The Lexington in London was noted for blending dystopian themes with humor and emotional depth. The Times praised the band's ability to turn apocalyptic anger into exhilarating celebration, highlighting their dynamic energy and inventive wordplay.

== Band members ==
=== Current members ===
- Kingsley Hall – vocals, lyrics, composer
- Robbie Major – composer, electronics, synthesizers

=== Past members ===
- Hugh Major – synthesizers
- Paul Chapman – guitar (formerly of The Chapman Family)
- Neil Cooper – drums (of Therapy?)
- Rick McMurray – drums (of Ash)
- Cat Myers – drums (of Texas)
- Dale Frost – drums (of FROST)
- Jonny Snowball – drums
- Mike Kitching – drums

== Discography ==
=== Studio albums ===
- Nails (2023)
- Constant Noise (2025)
