= Pulled Apart by Horses =

English alternative rock band

Pulled Apart By Horses
- Pulled Apart by Horses performing live in 2018

Background information
- Origin: Leeds, West Yorkshire, UK
- Genres: Garage punk; noise rock; post-hardcore; math rock
- Years active: 2008–present
- Labels: Alcopop, Transgressive, Big Scary Monsters, On the Bone, Dance to the Radio, Sony RED, A Remarkable Idea
- Spinoffs: Menace Beach
- Members: Tom Hudson; Robert Lee; Tommy Davidson; Joseph Thorpe
- Past members: Lee Vincent; James Adrian Brown
- Website: pulledapartbyhorses.com

Pulled Apart by Horses are an English alternative rock band from Leeds. The band was formed in early 2008, by vocalist/guitarist Tom Hudson, bassist Robert Lee, guitarist James Adrian Brown and drummer Lee Vincent. The band were signed by Transgressive Records in 2009, and released their debut self-titled album Pulled Apart by Horses on 21 June 2010 and their second album Tough Love was released to critical acclaim in 2012. Their third album Blood was released in 2014, and was their final release with Vincent. That year, his role was filled by Tommy Davidson, who performed on their fourth album The Haze (2017). In 2019, the band recorded their fifth album Reality Cheques, which saw Hudson stop playing guitar, solely becoming vocalist. Due to the COVID-19 lockdowns, the album's release was delayed until 2022. That year, Brown announced his departure, leading Lee to move from bass to guitar and bass duties become filled by Joseph Thorpe.

== History ==
=== Formation (2008) ===
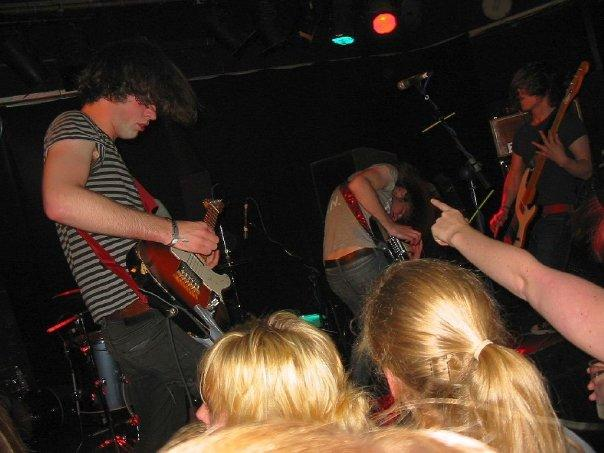
Pulled Apart by Horses live in 2008

Pulled Apart By Horses has its origins in the 2008 breakup of Leeds band Mother Vulpine. James Adrian Brown, the founder of On the Bone Records and former guitarist in It Takes Bridges, who had released Mother Vulpine's only single, believed the record label would soon close. In response, he decided to form a band consisting of members of On the Bone bands. He first contacted Lee Vincent, a former member of Concentration Champ, through the Leedsmusicscene.net forum, suggesting they make music influenced by the Jesus Lizard. At the Brudenell Social Club, Brown brought up the idea to Robert Lee, bassist of Monster Kills by Laser, to which he said he was interesting in joining. They rehearsed three times as trio, Lee on bass, Brown on guitar and Vincent on drums. Brown asked Mother Vulpine bassist Tom Hudson to attend their fourth rehearsal "for a laugh" at House of Mook Studios in Meanwood. During the rehearsal, Hudson officially joined as guitarist and vocalist. The members had all moved to the city for university and recently graduated. They took the name "Pulled Apart by Horses" in reference to the song FeelingPulledApartByHorses by Thom Yorke.

For their first live performance, Brown posted on Leedsmusicscene.net saying anybody who wished to attend could text a number and they would be notified of the location on the day. It took place on 12 February 2008 at The Packhorse pub. The support for the event was That Fucking Tank.

The band then began touring in 2008 and soon received notable attention from the press and media due to their live performances and soon began to gain a quickly growing fan base. They also began to be known for their very frantic live performances during which band members have been known to be injured. On 17 May 2008, when headlining Nastyfest IX in Leeds to a packed audience, a chaotic and injury stricken performance took place leading to guitarist James Brown being sent to hospital with a gash to the head.

=== Early singles (2008–2009) ===
The band's debut single, "Meat Balloon", was released via Big Scary Monsters Recording Company in October 2008. It debuted at No. 18 on the UK Indie Singles chart. The limited edition 7" single came with a free CD and comic, created by Hudson. On the back of their live repuation, they were approached by Brontone Management who asked to sign them and begin doing the band full-time. In January 2009, PABH released their single "I Punched A Lion In The Throat" on Too Pure/Beggars on 7" vinyl, with b-side "The Crapsons". The song was also made available as a free download on the band's official website. That year, the band went on to constantly tour for one year before the release of the debut album playing larger shows supporting Blood Red Shoes, Future of the Left, the Bronx, Rolo Tomassi, Glassjaw and Anti Flag.

=== Pulled Apart by Horses (2009–2011) ===
Pulled Apart by Horses performing live in 2010

Once the band became busy with frequent touring in the UK and Europe they self-released 500 copies a 5 track CD which was only available at shows whilst they were securing a record deal. A second run off 500 were made in early 2010 prior to their debut record release. That year also saw the release of the first record and the band headlining two full UK and European tours and more supporting tours with the likes of Biffy Clyro and Foals, and then in 2010 supported Muse at Manchester County Cricket Ground. On 21 March, Transgressive Records announced the release of a strictly limited 12" vinyl release titled 'Live At Leeds' to be released on Record Store Day (17 April) in the UK. The record would appear to borrow the idea from The Who classic album with artwork and packaging being similar. The 'Live at Leeds' album is available to download from the band's official website.

Between tours, Pulled Apart by Horses took a two week break and wrote their debut album. It was released as Pulled Apart by Horses on 28 June 2010.

=== Tough Love, Blood and The Haze (2012–2019) ===
Drummer Lee Vincent (left) departed from the band in 2014

In August 2011, they went into Monnow Valley Studio in Wales to record with record producer Gil Norton, and their second album Tough Love was released to critical acclaim on 20 January 2012. The band went out to play a headline tour in the UK and Europe to support the record from February to April which included a sold-out show in London at the Electric Ballroom. Later in 2012 the band announced a full UK tour for November which was then announced as being pulled from the band's website due to 'unforeseen circumstances' Then, the band sold out their first European tour, and went on to support Biffy Clyro and Foals. In 2010 they supported Muse at the Old Trafford Cricket Ground. In early 2014, Vincent departed from the band, replaced by Tommy Davidson.

In September 2014 the band's third album Blood became their first top 40, entering the UK Albums Chart at number 38. In 2016, Pulled Apart by Horses recorded a take over for Annie Mac and the BBC's Radio 1 in the United Kingdom. The band's fourth album, The Haze was released in March 2017.

=== Reality Cheques (2019–present) ===
In 2019, they toured the United Kingdom performing songs from their unreleased fifth album, with Hudson no longer playing guitar, to focus solely on vocals. Two weeks later, they entered Nave Studios in Leeds to record the album. In October 2021, the band signed with Alcopop! Records. On 25 May 2022, Brown announced his departure from the band. The album was released as Reality Cheques on 30 September 2022. They soon hired Joseph Thorpe, formerly of Rolo Tomassi as bassist, with Lee moving to guitar.

== Musical style and influences ==
Critics have categorised Pulled Apart by Horses' music as garage punk, post-hardcore, noise rock and math rock. In a 2010 interview with Drowned in Sound, they stated their goal was to make music that was "heavy without being metal" and incorporate unorthodox time signatures.

Pulled Apart by Horses's early influences included Blakfish, Meet Me in St. Louis, Reuben, At the Drive-In, Refused, Fudge Tunnel, Nirvana, Shellac, the Jesus Lizard and King Crimson. In a 2024 interview, Lee stated many of their influences at this stage were local Leeds bands. They were then inspired by early tours alongside Biffy Clyro, Blood Red Shoes and Future of the Left. Other influences they have cited include Sugar, Tool, Pulp and Blur.

On Blood (2014), they were influenced by Black Sabbath, Rage Against the Machine, Queens of the Stone Age, the Wytches, Metz, Part Chimp, Roomrunner, Marnie Stern, the Pixies, Sonic Youth, the Smashing Pumpkins, Suede, Roxy Music, Post War Glamour Girls, the Cribs and Osee. On The Haze (2017), they were influenced by Uncle Acid & the Deadbeats, King Gizzard & the Lizard Wizard, Big Business, Fuzz, Meatbodies, the 13th Floor Elevators, Hot Snakes, the Stooges, Iggy Pop, Kurt Vile, Preoccupations, Arctic Monkeys, the Fall, Television, Joy Division, Kraftwerk, Can, David Bowie, the Beatles and Ty Segall. On Reality Cheques (2022), they were influences mostly by 1960s and 1970s bands, particularly in the punk rock and garage rock genres, including the Stooges, Television, the Cramps, Misfits, the Ramones, Patti Smith, the Rolling Stones, the Fall, Joy Division, Velvet Underground and David Bowie. They also cited newer musicians Amyl and the Sniffers, Viagra Boys, Ty Segall, Metz, Fuzz and Osees.

The Guardian credited Pulled Apart By Horses with helping to originate the late 2000s and 2010s grunge revival, alongside fellow Leeds bands Dinosaur Pile-Up, Old Romantic Killer Band and Wonderswan. These bands adopted elements of grunge as a rejection of the locally-dominant New Yorkshire scene of clean-production indie rock.

They have been cited as an influence by Blacklisters, the Wytches, Drenge, Fizzy Blood and Fangclub. In a 2026 interview, James Smith of Yard Act and Post-War Glamour Girls stated that the first live show he attended in Leeds was Pulled Apart by Horses in 2009, noting them as a favourite and his introduction to the Brudenell Social Club, which would be an important location for his bands.

== Band members ==
- Tom Hudson – lead vocals (2008–present), guitar (2008–2019)
- Robert John Lee – guitar, backing vocals (2022–present), bass (2008–2022)
- Tommy Davison – drums (2014–present)
- Joseph Thorpe – bass (2022–present)

=== Past members ===
- James Brown – guitar (2008–2022)
- Lee Vincent – drums, percussion (2008–2014)

=== Live members ===
- Lindsay Wilson – bass (intermittent mid-set fill ins)

== Discography ==
=== Studio albums ===
Title	Album details	Peak chart positions
Title	Album details	UK
Pulled Apart by Horses	Released: 21 June 2010; Label: Transgressive Records; Format: CD, digital download	—
Tough Love	Released: 23 January 2012; Label: Transgressive Records; Format: Vinyl, CD, digital download	67
Blood	Released: 1 September 2014; Label: Sony Music; Format: Vinyl, CD, digital download	38
The Haze	Released: 17 March 2017; Label: Caroline International; Format: Vinyl, CD, digital download	-
Reality Cheques	Released: 30 September 2022; Label: Alcopop! Records; Format: Vinyl, CD, digital download	-
"—" denotes album that did not chart or was not released

=== Singles ===
Year	Title	Album
2008	"Meat Balloon / Super Hang-on"	Non-Album Track
2009	"I Punched A Lion In The Throat / The Crapsons"	Non-Album Track
2010	"Back To The Fuck Yeah"	Pulled Apart By Horses
2010	"High Five, Swan Dive, Nose Dive"	Pulled Apart By Horses
2010	"Yeah Buddy"	Pulled Apart By Horses
2011	"I Punched A Lion In The Throat" (re-release)	Pulled Apart By Horses
2011	"V.E.N.O.M."	Tough Love
2012	"Wolf Hand"	Tough Love
2012	"Bromance Ain't Dead"	Tough Love
2012	"Epic Myth"	Tough Love
2014	"Hot Squash"	Blood
2014	"Lizard Baby"	Blood
2014	"Medium Rare"	Blood
2017	"The Big What If"	Haze
2017	"Hotel Motivation"	Haze
2022	"Sleep in Your Grave"	Reality Cheques

=== EPs ===
- Tour Traxx (2009)
- Live At Leeds 12" Vinyl (2010)

=== Split singles ===
- Pulled Apart By Horses/Holy State (2009)
- DTTR 4x12" Vol 1 (2009)
- Pulled Apart By Horses/Blood Red Shoes (2013)

=== Music videos ===
- "Meat Balloon" (2009)
- "Back to the Fuck Yeah" (2010)
- "High Five, Swan Dive, Nose Dive" (2010)
- "Yeah Buddy" (2010)
- "I Punched a Lion in the Throat" (2011)
- "V.E.N.O.M." (2011)
- "Wolf Hand" (2012)
- "Bromance Ain't Dead" (2012)
- "Epic Myth" (2012)
- "Hot Squash" (2014)
- "Lizard Baby" (2014)
- "Medium Rare" (2014)
- "Grim Deal" (2015)
- "The Big What If" (2016)
- "Hotel Motivation" (2016)
- "Is This Thing On?" (2019)
- "First World Problems (2022)
- "Rinse & Repeat" (2023)
