= Blood (Pulled Apart by Horses album) =

Studio album by Pulled Apart by Horses
- Released: 1 September 2014
- Genres: Alternative rock, post-hardcore
- Length: 40:57
- Label: Best Of The Best / Sony RED
- Producer: Matt Peel

Pulled Apart by Horses chronology
Tough Love (2012)	Blood (2014)	The Haze (2017)

Singles from Blood
- 1. "Hot Squash" Released: 12 May 2014; 2. "Lizard Baby" Released: 27 July 2014

Blood is the third album from the Leeds four piece Pulled Apart by Horses. It was released on 1 September 2014. On 6 September, it entered the UK Albums Chart at number 38, giving the band their first top 40 album.

Professional ratings
Aggregate scores
Source	Rating
Metacritic	75/100
Review scores
Source	Rating
DIY (magazine)	(8/10)
Drowned in Sound	(8/10)
The Guardian	4/5 stars
Q Magazine	4/5 stars

== Track listing ==
No.	Title	Length
1.	"Hot Squash"	3:57
2.	"ADHD in HD"	3:29
3.	"Lizard Baby"	3:11
4.	"You Want It"	3:03
5.	"Hello Men"	3:20
6.	"Skull Noir"	3:24
7.	"Grim Deal"	2:50
8.	"Bag of Snakes"	2:00
9.	"Outahead"	3:05
10.	"Medium Rare"	4:05
11.	"Weird Weather"	3:03
12.	"Golden Monument"	5:00
