= Pulled Apart by Horses (album) =

Studio album by Pulled Apart by Horses
- Released: 21 June 2010
- Genres: Alternative rock, stoner rock, post-hardcore
- Length: 35:53
- Label: Transgressive

Pulled Apart by Horses chronology
Pulled Apart by Horses (2010)	Tough Love (2012)

Singles from Pulled Apart by Horses
- 1. "Back to the Fuck Yeah" Released: 14 June 2010; 2. "High Five, Swan Dive, Nose Dive" Released: 6 September 2010; 3. "Yeah Buddy" Released: 29 November 2010; 4. "I Punched A Lion in the Throat" Released: 7 March 2011

Pulled Apart by Horses is the self-titled debut album from the Leeds four piece of the same name. The album was announced to the public on 29 April 2010, along with the title of the first single "Back to the Fuck Yeah". The album was released on 21 June 2010 in the UK ahead of the tour that took place throughout June 2010, which included appearances at Glastonbury and the Reading and Leeds Festivals.

== Track listing ==
No.	Title	Length
1.	"Back to the Fuck Yeah"	2:41
2.	"The Crapsons"	2:14
3.	"High Five, Swan Dive, Nose Dive"	2:54
4.	"Yeah Buddy"	2:27
5.	"I Punched a Lion in the Throat"	3:14
6.	"I've Got a Guest List to Rory O'Hara's Suicide"	2:20
7.	"Get Off My Ghost Train"	3:27
8.	"Meat Balloon"	3:26
9.	"Moonlit Talons"	3:27
10.	"'The Lighthouse"	2:16
11.	"Den Horn"	7:27

=== iTunes Bonus track ===
No.	Title	Length
12.	"E=MC Hammer"	3:08

== Reception ==
Professional ratings
Review scores
Source	Rating
Drowned in Sound	8/10
The Guardian	4/5 stars
NME	8/10
Rock Sound	7/10

Upon its release, Pulled Apart by Horses received positive reviews.
