= Undertow (Drenge album) =

Studio album by Drenge
- Released: 6 April 2015
- Recorded: 2014, McCall Sound Studios
- Genre: Punk rock; garage rock
- Label: Infectious
- Producer: Ross Orton

Drenge chronology
Drenge (2013)	Undertow (2015)	Autonomy (2018)

Singles from Undertow
- 1. "We Can Do What We Want" Released: 24 February 2015; 2. "Never Awake" Released: 2 March 2015; 3. "Favourite Son" Released: 25 March 2015

Professional ratings
Aggregate scores
Source	Rating
Metacritic	78/100
Review scores
Source	Rating
Allmusic	4/5 stars
DIY	5/5 stars
Drowned in Sound	7/10
The Guardian	4/5 stars
Mojo	3/5 stars
NME	9/10
The Observer	3/5 stars
Rolling Stone	3.5/5 stars
Q	}
Uncut	7/10

Undertow is the second album by Drenge released on 6 April 2015. Their first release since expanding to a three-piece with the addition of bassist Rob Graham, who played on three tracks, the album was produced by Ross Orton and recorded at McCall Sound Studios in late 2014.

The album was announced on 27 January 2015 and the band performed a track from it on The Late Show with David Letterman the same day, their first appearance on American television.

The album's release was followed by a UK tour in April 2015.

The first single to be taken from the album, "We Can Do What We Want", was released in January 2015.

== Critical response ==
Drenge's second record was well received by critics. DIY Magazine awarded the album a perfect score calling Drenge "a band finding their feet before taking to the skies." The continued: "The brilliance of ‘Undertow’ is in knowing just how much more Drenge can achieve." The Guardian described Undertow as "the sound of a band who’ve found their murky flow" and "an album that will pull you under." The NME said the album marks Drenge as the "UK’s most brilliantly disorderly band." The Line of Best Fit declared: "Drenge make a bloodied mess of the idea 'second album syndrome.'" They continued: "Their second album continues the work of the first, a yardstick for the heavy guitar sound, and is in its own way as hard hitting, visceral and effortlessly brilliant." They awarded the album a score of 8.5.

== Accolades ==
Publication	Accolade	Year	Rank
NME	NME'S Albums of the Year 2015	2015	38

== Track listing ==
No.	Title	Length
1.	"Introduction"	1:12
2.	"Running Wild"	3:45
3.	"Never Awake"	3:32
4.	"We Can Do What We Want"	2:56
5.	"Favourite Son"	2:27
6.	"The Snake"	4:00
7.	"Side By Side"	3:35
8.	"The Woods"	3:33
9.	"Undertow"	2:41
10.	"Standing in the Cold"	5:36
11.	"Have You Forgotten My Name?"	4:23

== Personnel ==
Drenge

- Eoin Loveless – lead vocals, guitar
- Rory Loveless – drums
- Rob Graham – bass guitar

== Charts ==
Chart (2015)	Peak position
Belgian Albums (Ultratop Flanders)	196
UK Albums (OCC)	14
