= Wolf People =

English rock band

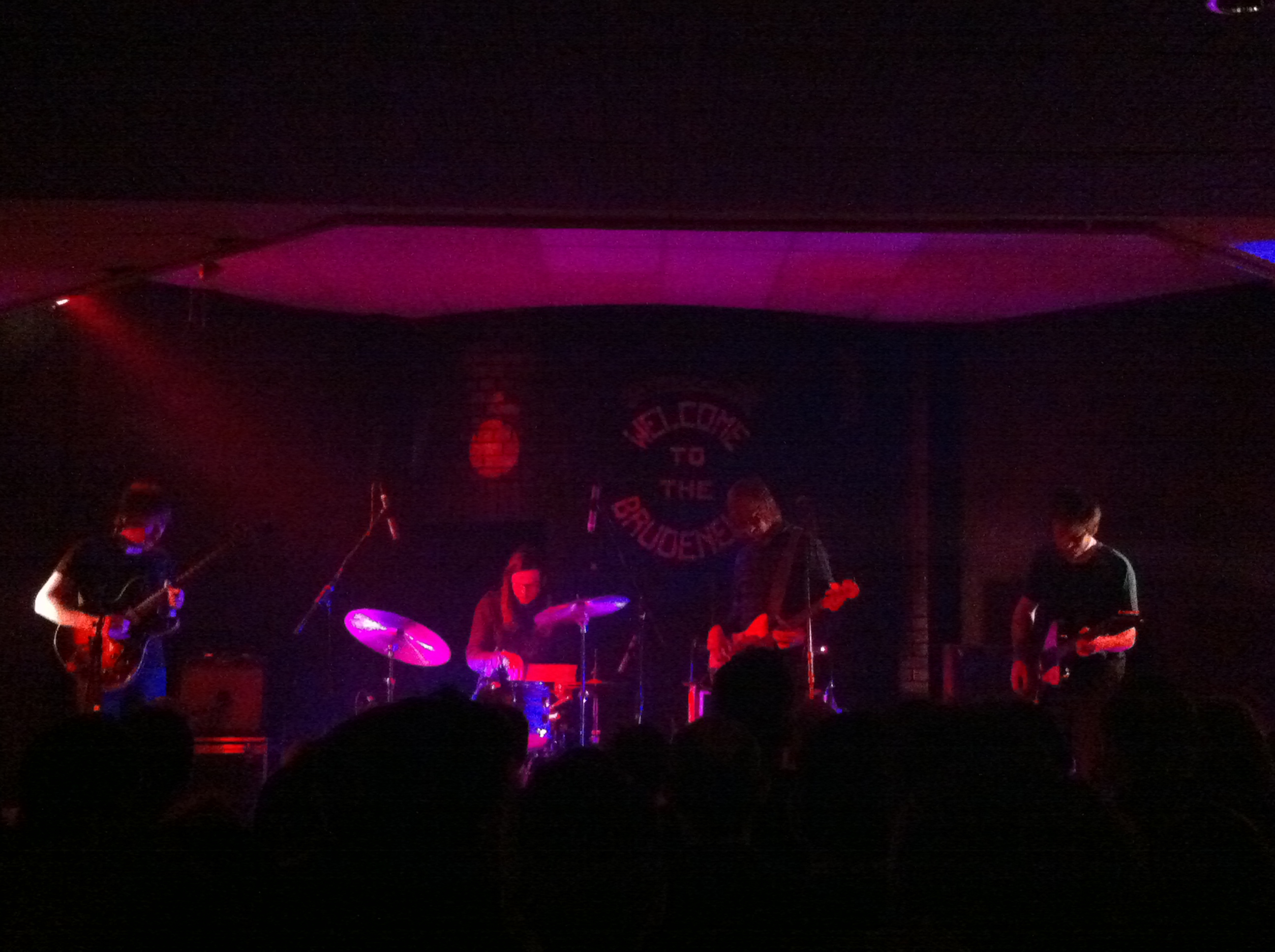
- Wolf People performing at Brudenell Social Club, Leeds on 14 January 2012

Background information
- Origin: Bedford, England
- Genres: Psychedelic rock
- Years active: 2005–2020
- Label: Jagjaguwar
- Members: Jack Sharp; Joe Hollick; Dan Davies; Tom Watt

Wolf People were an English psychedelic rock band, formed by singer and guitarist Jack Sharp in Bedford in 2005. The band announced an indefinite hiatus in January 2020.

After returning to his home of Bedfordshire following a period living in London, Sharp began recording songs under the name Wolf People, after the Margaret Greaves children's book Little Jacko and the Wolf People. After releasing some of these songs as singles on the Battered Ornament label, Sharp joined up with childhood friend and drummer Tom Watt and guitarist Joe Hollick and the three began performing live. Following the addition of bassist Dan Davies, Wolf People became a band, rather than just a vehicle for Sharp's solo material, and were the first British band signed by American record label Jagjaguwar.

Wolf People released their first two albums in 2010 - Tidings, a compilation of singles and demos recorded between 2005 and 2009, and the group's debut album proper, Steeple. Both albums were inspired by folk music in general and bands such as Pentangle and received generally positive reviews from critics, although some criticism was levelled at the band for trying too hard to recreate the sounds of 1960s and 70s rock music. The band's next album, Fain, was recorded in guitarist Joe Hollick's house in Skipton, Yorkshire and saw the group experimenting with complex song structures. Reviews were again mostly positive, although some critics felt the album to be too similar to its predecessors in its psychedelic rock sound and use of lengthy guitar solos.

The band's final album, Ruins, was released in 2016 and saw them attempting a more hard rock sound, with the loss of some of their earlier record's folkiness. Writing for the record took place online, with members passing on song ideas and music they liked over the internet, but the songs on the album were almost exclusively recorded live, with the band performing together in the same room.

== History ==
=== Formation ===
Frontman Jack Sharp grew up in Clophill, Bedfordshire. At 14 years old, Sharp approached future Wolf People drummer Tom Watt, who lived nearby, and asked if he would like to join his band, having heard drumming coming from Watt's house. Watt agreed despite the fact that he couldn't actually play drums - the noise Sharp had heard had actually been made by Watt's drummer sister.

The pair initially worked on hip hop songs before Sharp listened to British folk band Pentangle's debut album, which he had bought years earlier for sampling, and something "just clicked". Sharp began listening to artists such as Anne Briggs, Shirley Collins and The Young Tradition as a result and eventually recorded demos of songs influenced by folk music and Captain Beefheart after moving back to Bedfordshire following a period of living in London.

Choosing the name Wolf People after the Margaret Greaves children's book Little Jacko and the Wolf People, Sharp made some of his demos available on the internet in 2005 and over the next two years released several singles and EPs on Battered Ornament records. Sharp joined up with Watt and guitarist Joe Hollick, and the trio began performing his songs live. Following the addition of bassist Dan Davies, who the group met in London, Wolf People became a band rather than simply a name for Sharp's solo project, and started writing material together. The group eventually became the first British group to sign to American record label Jagjaguwar.

=== Tidings ===
==== Recording ====
Wolf People's first release for Jagjaguwar was the singles and outtakes collection Tidings. Released on 22 February 2010 in the UK, the album brought together various tracks Sharp had recorded between 2005 and 2009. (Note: Many reviewers, such as Mojo's Peter Watts, Pitchfork's Zach Kelly, MusicOMH's Darren Lee, and Tiny Mix Tapes' Julia Reidy reported that Tidings contained tracks recorded between 2005 and 2007, while the album's liner notes give dates of 2005 to 2009.) As well as the influence of Pentangle and folk music in general, Sharp has claimed that the melodies and guitar sounds on Tidings were inspired by the Captain Beefheart record Safe as Milk.

==== Critical reception ====
The album received mostly positive reviews, with a score of 71 on Metacritic from 6 reviews, denoting a "generally favourable" response from critics. Giving Tidings a score of 6.4 out of 10, Pitchfork's Zach Kelly lamented the addition of so many interludes, which he characterised as "field recordings or outtakes of aimless strumming, strange whirrings, and drunken ramblings", among album highlights, such as the "crunchy slab of drug-rock steeped in mystic imagery" "Black Water", and "Cotton Strands", which he compared to Love. Kelly also singled out "Untitled"; "Empty Heart", which he likened to the music of T. Rex; and the "wild, noodly groover" "October Fires" with its "sweaty honky-tonk rhythm, harmonica, and punchy guitar details"; for praise. MusicOMH's Darren Lee also felt that "October Fires" was one of the album's highlights, comparing it to the Grateful Dead circa Aoxomoxoa, but felt the album's "slavish devotion" to recreating the psychedelic rock of the late 1960s and early 70s was its main weakness. Nevertheless, Lee awarded the album three and a half stars out of five, describing it as a "promising but ramshackle collection". Writing for Mojo, critic Philip Wilding agreed, giving the album three stars out of five and stating that the "disparate set" of recordings contained on the record provided a "promising indicator" of the music the band's debut album proper might contain. Tiny Mix Tapes' Julia Reidy gave Tidings four stars out of five in her review for the website, commending the juxtaposition of "grinding, pentatonic melody" and "buzzing and hissing and muted, melancholy vocals" featured of "Storm Cloud" and the "Hendrix-y guitar" and vocal melodies, with complementary instrumental backing of bells and harmonica, of "Empty Heart". In contrast with Zach Kelly, Reidy stated that she felt the musical interludes added character to the album and helped it achieve an "unexpectedly complete, avant-garde reimagining of 60s and 70s psychedelic rock" reminiscent of the tapes pictured on its cover art. Uncut's Peter Watts agreed, stating that he felt the mood of Tidings was enhanced by the interludes and that the "creepy half songs, found sounds and noodlings" mixed well with the likes of the "folk rock" "Cotton Sounds" and the Electric Prunes sounding "October Fire" to produce an album that had "much to recommend it".

=== Steeple ===
==== Recording ====
Steeple, the band's debut album proper, was released eight months after Tidings, on 10 October 2010. Recording took place at York Street Studios, Bedford and Mwnci Studios in Wales, with "Tiny Circle" being recorded at Shock and Awe Studios, Barnet. The album's lyrics feature an "underlying mysticism", with Sharp taking inspiration from traditional folk songs and traditional British and Irish folk tales. "Painted Cross" was inspired by the 1960s desecration of St Mary's Church, Clophill. According to Sharp, when his family moved to Clophill in the 1980s the church was still visited by hundreds of people each Halloween and he wrote the lyrics "from the perspective of the families of the people whose bones were dug up". "One By One From Dorney Reach" also had a real life inspiration, with Sharp writing about the 1961 A6 murder. Sharp has said that "Silbury Sands" was the most collaborative effort included on Steeple and also one of the most rewarding tracks to record, stating that the band "had so many bits and pieces that worked together, when they finally clicked in to place it was great".

==== Critical reception ====
Like its predecessor, Steeple garnered mostly positive reviews, achieving a score of 77 on Metacritic based on 11 reviews, denoting a "generally favourable" response from critics. Writing for the NME, Emily Mackay awarded the album three and a half stars out of five, claiming that it was "just odd enough to escape period-piece pastiche" and that the band's mix of different styles and musical eras made them akin to a "UK version of White Denim". musicOMH's Gideon Brody gave Steeple three stars out of five, stating that, while the album felt more "potent" than the works of bands such as Ocean Colour Scene and Kula Shaker, who he thought were similarly in debt to the psychedelic blues-rock music of the past, it was lacking in creativity. Although Brody criticised Steeple's "timid" vocals and "Led Zep-lite lyrics" and stated that its "soul [...] will probably forever be caught in a bygone time", he felt that it was an enjoyable album and "hopefully the start of something, rather than a pinnacle". Mojo's Will Hodgkinson found similarities between Steeple's and the music of the "post-psychedelic, pre-progressive rock" period and claimed that Sharp's vocals reminded him of "Traffic-era Steve Winwood", while the album's lyrics recalled "the menace of the British Countryside in the manner of 70's horror movies". Hodgkinson awarded Steeple four stars out of five and stated that it was "an exciting, evocative album". Uncut's Peter Watts also gave the record four stars out of five, likening Wolf People to both Jethro Tull and contemporaneous Canadian rock band Black Mountain, and selecting the "elegantly ragged boogie" of "Castle Keep" as Steeple's best song. Writing for The Skinny, Oisín Kealy gave the album four stars out of five and stated that it showed evidence of their being "something a little wild" about Wolf People. Kealy went on to compare "Silbury Sands" to "The Black Keys taking on the Moody Blues or Pentangle" and claimed that the "funky flute riff" of "Tiny Circles" was an "unlikely but astounding addition" and made the album. Giving the album 7 stars out of ten, PopMatters Matthew Fiander also asserted that "Tiny Circles" was the best song on the album and commented on the funkiness of its flute riff, going on to highlight a trio of songs—"Morning Born", "Cromlech" and "One By One From Dorney Reach"—which he felt made the middle of the record "particularly strong". Like other reviewers, Fiander suggested that Steeple "walks a fine line between revivalism and timelessness" but found that its execution and number of "unique turns" lent it more of the latter quality. Julia Reidy gave the record three and a half stars out of five in her review for Tiny Mix Tapes, stating that while it has a "completeness to it, a reassuring wholeness even when things get loud or wild or weird", Steeple "errs on the side of monotony" in "sticking firmly to its take on authentic psychedelia" in contrast with previous album Tidings, which she felt was more adventurous and exotic sounding. Theo Krekis gave Steeple 7 out of 10 in his review for the Drowned in Sound website, congratulating Sharp on his vocal performance and stating that "Tiny Circle" and "Painted Cross" were the best songs on the album, both finding "common ground between both the people's psychedelia of Ocean Colour Scene's "Riverboat Song", the rawness of Queens of the Stone Age's Era Vulgaris and the progressiveness of Battles". In his four-star-out-of-five review for Classic Rock, Scott Rowley claimed that Steeple was a "late contender for album of the year", picking out "Tiny Circle", "One by One From Dorney Reach" and "Banks of Sweet Dundee" as the record's highlights and likening Wolf People to the Incredible String Band, Jethro Tull, Black Sabbath, Led Zeppelin and Fairport Convention. Writing for the BBC's website, Noel Gardner was even more enthusiastic, calling Steeple "one of the towering highlights of 2010". Gardner praised Wolf People's musicianship, in particular the "swinging funkiness" of drummer Tom Watt, and likened them to Fairport Convention, Black Sabbath, Black Mountain and Swedish rock bands Graveyard and Witchcraft.

=== Fain ===
==== Recording ====
Fain was recorded at guitarist Joe Hollick's home—an old gatehouse by a river in Skipton, Yorkshire—a location drummer Tom Watt has described as an "inspiring [...] beautiful place". When renting the house, Hollick agreed with his landlord that he would be recording a "four piece noisy rock band in the front room". During sessions, Watts, singer Jack Sharp and bassist Dan Davies camped outside the house so their equipment, including vintage guitars and amplifiers, could be stored inside. The band experimented with complex song structures, while Sharp performed "exhaustive research" when writing his lyrics, citing the "sense [of] depth" evident in Richard Thompson's songs because of the research the ex-Fairport Convention guitarist carries out, as an inspiration. The track "When the Fire Is Dead in the Grate" was influenced by the "seaside folk superstition" Sharp read in David Thomson's 1954 book, The People of the Sea. The Besnard Lakes' Jace Lasek provides backing vocals on "All Returns".

==== Critical reception ====
Fain received mostly positive reviews, achieving a score of 72 on Metacritic based on 11 reviews, denoting a "generally favourable" response from critics. Max Evans, writing for website The Quietus, stated that, although Wolf People are clearly influenced by the folk-rock and prog music on the 70s, on Fain they "inject their influences with an honest vitality that keeps them truly alive" and are able to create a unique sound. Pitchfork's Paul Thompson awarded the album 5.9 out of 10, stating that Wolf People narrowed their influences to just a "few strains of turn-of-the-70s UK rock" when creating Fain, a policy which he thought resulted in them "going in circles". Thompson was also critical of the record's "constant guitar wig-outs", which he felt made for a disjointed album, although he did praise Jack Sharp's vocals and the "spiralling riff" of "When the Fire is Dead in the Grate", which he thought was Fain's highlight. MusicOMH's Max Raymond also felt that Fain saw Wolf People "retreading the same ground" and was critical of the unfocussed nature of many of the tracks in his three-star-out-of-five review. Janne Oinonen, writing for The Line of Best Fit, took the opposite view, stating that the album saw Wolf People amplifying "the healthy appreciation of English and Scottish folk song traditions" which had appeared on their previous albums and suggesting that the band were able to create something modern by blending their influences together, in a similar way that "masters of vintage British folk-rock" had done in the past. Oinonen awarded Fain 8.5 out of ten, complimenting the lyrics, which he felt helped to "create a totally convincing alternative universe", and the complicated song structures which, while initially confusing, became the album's "greatest strength, as all those rapidly shifting motifs and riffs unveil their razor-sharp fangs". Record Collector's Oregano Rathbone awarded Fain four stars out of five and also thought that Wolf People were able to transcend their influences on the album, giving "no impression of being beholden to easy nostalgia and slavish mimicry." Fain received 8 out of 10 from Rob Hughes in his review for Uncut. Hughes described the album as "deliciously wiggy prog-folk" and singled out the "phosphorescence" of "Hesperus" and "NRR"'s "spidery tangle of rural mores and garage grooves" as evidence of Wolf People's "modernist witchery".

=== Ruins ===
==== Recording ====
Ruins was recorded in studios in Devon, the Isle Of Wight and London. The band attempted to "remove at least some of [their] folkiness" and, according to singer Sharp, were heavily influenced by the music of Black Sabbath, "early UK hard rock" and Scottish band Iron Claw while writing songs for the album. As the four band members live in different parts of the United Kingdom, communication was mostly done via the internet, with Sharp, Hollick, Davies and Watt "sharing stuff [they] like" along with song ideas. The band attempted to capture the "magic and excitement" of them playing together so, unlike their previous albums and with the exception of the track "Ninth Night", avoided the use of overdubs where possible. The album title refers to the "ruins of civilisation" and Sharp's lyrics try to imagine "what the world might be like without humans".

==== Critical reception ====
Ruins received mostly positive reviews, achieving a score of 78 on Metacritic based on 8 reviews, denoting a "generally favourable" response from critics. Many reviewers commented on the fact that Ruins was a 'heavier' album than its predecessors, with Uncut's Joe Anderson stating that its tracks are "sharply focused and blessedly heavy" in comparison with the band's earlier work, which he felt were "sometimes blighted by a weakness for jammy indulgence". Writing for Classic Rock, Jo Kendall said that Wolf People sound "decidedly fucked off" on the album, citing Ruins opening trio of "dirty, Vertigo-style garage-rock belters". The Guardian's Michael Hann similarly commented on the record's combination of pastoral folk music and metal, claiming that "if Fairport Convention had preferred Black Sabbath to Bob Dylan, they might have sounded like this".

=== Hiatus ===
Citing "the geographical distance between us and increased personal and family commitments", the band announced an indefinite hiatus in January 2020.

== Band members ==
- Jack Sharp – lead vocals, guitar (2005–2020)
- Joe Hollick – guitar (c. 2007–2020)
- Dan Davies – bass (c.2007–2020)
- Tom Watt – drums (c.2007–2020)

== Discography ==
=== Studio albums ===
- Tidings (2010)
- Steeple (2010)
- Fain (2013)
- Ruins (2016)

=== Singles ===
- "Silbury Sands" / "Dry" (Jagjaguwar JAG189), 2011
- "When The Fire Is Dead in the Grate" / "Become The Ground" / "All Returns" / "All Returns Part II" (Jagjaguwar JAG248), 2013

== Bibliography ==
- Anderson, Jason (1 December 2016). "Wolf People – Ruins". Uncut. Archived from the original on 28 October 2016.
- Brody, Gideon (11 October 2010). "Wolf People – Steeple". musicOMH. Archived from the original on 15 May 2013.
- Carr, Paul (30 January 2017). "Crumbling Dais – An Interview With Wolf People". PopMatters. Archived from the original on 30 January 2017.
- Cox, Tom (21 July 2013). "Wolf People: 'Folk songs are there to tell a story'". The Guardian. Archived from the original on 28 October 2016.
- Cronshaw, Jon (31 May 2013). "Join the pack crying wolf ahead of gig". Yorkshire Post. Archived from the original on 2 February 2017.
- Ewing, Jerry (16 January 2020). "Wolf People announce indefinite hiatus". Louder Sound. Archived from the original on 16 November 2020.
- Evans, Max (2 May 2013). "Wolf People: Fain". The Quietus.
- Fiander, Matthew (12 October 2010). "Wolf People – Steeple". PopMatters. Archived from the original on 15 April 2016.
- Fortunato, John (30 March 2011). "Interview with Jack Sharp of Wolf People: Climb Broad 'Steeple'". The Aquarian Weekly. Archived from the original on 3 November 2013.
- Gardner, Noel (2010). "Wolf People — Steeple". BBC. Archived from the original on 9 January 2016.
- Hann, Michael (10 November 2016). "Wolf People review – folk-loving indie with a dark side". The Guardian. Archived from the original on 28 October 2016.
- Heaney, Gregory (2016). "Wolf People – artist biography". AllMusic. Archived from the original on 4 February 2017.
- Hodgkinson, Will (December 2010). "Wolf People – Steeple". Mojo. No. 205. p. 94.
- Hughes, Rob (June 2013). "Wolf People – Fain". Uncut. No. 193. p. 81.
- Ingalls, Chris (15 November 2016). "Wolf People – Ruins". PopMatters. Archived from the original on 16 November 2016.
- Kealy, Oisín (23 September 2010). "Wolf People — Steeple". The Skinny. Archived from the original on 14 February 2017.
- Kelly, Zach (22 February 2010). "Wolf People: Tidings". Pitchfork. Archived from the original on 20 April 2016.
- Kendall, Jo (20 December 2016). "The best new prog albums you can buy this month". Classic Rock. Archived from the original on 10 February 2021.
- Krekis, Theo (11 October 2010). "Wolf People: Steeple". Drowned in Sound. Archived from the original on 28 October 2016.
- Lee, Darren (22 February 2010). "Wolf People – Tidings". musicOMH. Archived from the original on 19 July 2013.
- Lee, Stewart (20 March 2013). "Wolf People – a non press release by Stewart Lee". www.stewartlee.co.uk.
- Mackay, Emily (15 October 2010). "Album Review: Wolf People – Steeple (Jagjaguwar)". NME. Archived from the original on 6 February 2017.
- "Wolf People – Tidings". Metacritic. 2010. Archived from the original on 6 February 2017.
- "Wolf People – Steeple". Metacritic. 2010. Archived from the original on 29 May 2015.
- "Wolf People – Fain". Metacritic. 2013. Archived from the original on 9 December 2013.
- "Wolf People – Ruins". Metacritic. 2016. Archived from the original on 7 February 2017.
- Myers, Ben (2016). "Biography – Ben Myers on Ruins". www.wolfpeople.co.uk. Archived from the original on 10 October 2016.
- Oinonen, Janne (24 April 2013). "Wolf People – Fain". The Line of Best Fit. Archived from the original on 13 December 2013.
- Parker, Matt (22 November 2013). "Wolf People talk uncool influences and recording boot camp". MusicRadar. Archived from the original on 28 October 2016.
- Rathbone, Oregano (2013). "Wolf People – Fain". Record Collector. Archived from the original on 13 December 2013.
- Raymond, Max (8 May 2013). "Wolf People – Fain". musicOMH. Archived from the original on 9 June 2013.
- Reidy, Julie (4 March 2010). "Wolf People – Tidings". Tiny Mix Tapes. Archived from the original on 18 May 2013.
- Reidy, Julie (17 November 2010). "Wolf People – Steeple". Tiny Mix Tapes. Archived from the original on 13 November 2011.
- Rowley, Scott (8 December 2010). "Wolf People – Steeple". Classic Rock. Archived from the original on 14 February 2017.
- Sexton, Paul (3 November 2016). "Wolf People: The real story behind Ruins". Classic Rock. Archived from the original on 9 March 2017.
- Steeple (Liner notes). Jagjaguwar. 2010.
- Thompson, Paul (8 May 2013). "Wolf People: Fain". Pitchfork. Archived from the original on 3 July 2016.
- Steeple (Liner notes). Jagjaguwar. 2010.
- Watts, Peter (March 2010). "Wolf People – Tidings". Uncut. No. 154. p. 107.
- Watts, Peter (November 2010). "Wolf People – Steeples". Uncut. No. 162. p. 113.
- Westley, Nathan (17 November 2016). "Wolf People toughen up on Ruins". The Line of Best Fit. Archived from the original on 10 February 2021.
- Wilding, Philip (March 2010). "Wolf People – Tidings". Mojo. No. 196. p. 100.
