= Autonomy (Drenge EP) =

EP by Drenge
- Released: 5 October 2018
- Recorded: April–July 2018
- Genre: Alternative rock; blues rock; grunge; punk blues
- Length: 12:58
- Label: Infectious

Drenge chronology
Undertow (2015)	Autonomy (2018)	Strange Creatures (2019)

Professional ratings
Review scores
Source	Rating
DIY	4/5 stars
NME	3/5 stars
The Skinny	4/5 stars

Autonomy is an extended play released by British blues rock band, Drenge. The extended play was released on 5 October 2018 through Infectious, in between their second and third studio albums, Undertow and Strange Creatures, respectively.

== Track listing ==
No.	Title	Length
1.	"Autonomy"	3:27
2.	"Fades to Black"	2:59
3.	"Outside"	3:33
4.	"Before the War Begins"	2:59
Total length:		12:58

== Personnel ==
Drenge

- Eoin Loveless – lead vocals, guitar
- Rory Loveless – drums
- Rob Graham – bass guitar
