= Tough Love (Pulled Apart by Horses album) =

Studio album by Pulled Apart by Horses
- Released: 20 January 2012
- Genres: Alternative rock, neo-grunge, post-hardcore
- Length: 32:42
- Label: Transgressive
- Producer: Gil Norton

Pulled Apart by Horses chronology
Pulled Apart by Horses (2010)	Tough Love (2012)	Blood (2014)

Singles from Tough Love
- 1. "V.E.N.O.M" Released: 11 November 2011; 2. "Wolf Hand" Released: 23 April 2012; 3. "Bromance Ain't Dead" Released: 23 July 2012; 4. "Epic Myth" Released: 22 October 2012

Tough Love is the second album from the Leeds four piece Pulled Apart by Horses. It was recorded at Monnow Valley Studio in South Wales. It was released on 20 January 2012. In an interview with NME, Bassist Rob Lee explained that "This album is a lot more direct, we're better musicians and songwriters now. On the first one, we weren't that good as musicians, but now we've been touring relentlessly and we've got to be better players. We made our debut ourselves and it wasn't ambitious. This feels more like our first proper album and not just something for self-gratification. Every song on this album has its own personality and really stands on its own".

== Track listing ==
No.	Title	Length
1.	"V.E.N.O.M."	3:20
2.	"Wolf Hand"	2:38
3.	"Shake Off The Curse"	2:59
4.	"Epic Myth"	3:35
5.	"Some Mothers"	1:43
6.	"Night Of The Living (I'm Scared of People)"	3:49
7.	"Wildfire, Smoke & Doom"	2:23
8.	"Bromance Ain't Dead"	2:46
9.	"Give Me A Reason"	3:17
10.	"Degeneration Game"	2:10
11.	"Everything Dipped In Gold"	4:01

== Singles ==
V.E.N.O.M, the first single from the album, was released on 11 November 2011. The release of Wolf Hand followed on 23 April 2012, accompanied by a music video featuring the band performing Jackass-style stunts in a back garden. The band released their third single from the album, Bromance Ain't Dead, on 3 July 2012.

== Tour ==
The band recently filmed a documentary with Noisey detailing their UK tour in February 2012. The live footage featured in the documentary was filmed at The Electric Ballroom in Camden Town, London on 23 February 2012. The documentary features footage of vocalist Tom Hudson vomiting into a bucket after overexerting himself throughout the gig. The band played several dates on this tour, where they were supported by The Computers.

Pulled Apart By Horses are due to tour again in November 2012 off the back of the success of Tough Love.

== Reception ==
Professional ratings
Review scores
Source	Rating
AllMusic	3/5 stars
Drowned in Sound	8/10 stars
NME	8/10 stars

Tough Love received positive reviews, with an 8/10 from NME.
