= Strange Creatures (album) =

Studio album by Drenge
- Released: 22 February 2019
- Recorded: 2018
- Genre: Punk rock; garage rock; grunge
- Length: 38:04
- Label: Infectious; Rough Trade

Drenge chronology
Autonomy (2018)	Strange Creatures (2019)

Singles from Strange Creatures
- 1. "This Dance" Released: 4 May 2018; 2. "Autonomy" Released: 5 October 2018; 3. "Bonfire of the City Boys" Released: 5 November 2018; 4. "Never See the Signs" Released: 15 January 2019

Strange Creatures is the third studio album by British rock band, Drenge. The album was released on 22 February 2019 through Infectious Records.

== Background ==
The album was first announced on 29 October 2018 following the release of a four track EP titled, Autonomy.

== Track listing ==
No.	Title	Length
1.	"Bonfire of the City Boys"	4:10
2.	"This Dance"	2:31
3.	"Autonomy"	3:26
4.	"Teenage Love"	3:44
5.	"Strange Creatures"	4:24
6.	"Prom Night"	4:04
7.	"No Flesh Road"	4:31
8.	"Never See The Signs"	2:59
9.	"Avalanches"	3:59
10.	"When I Look Into Your Eyes"	4:16
Total length:		38:04

== Critical reception ==
Professional ratings
Aggregate scores
Source	Rating
Metacritic	67/100
Review scores
Source	Rating
DIY	3/5 stars
Dork	4/5 stars
NME	4/5 stars
Q	3/5 stars
The Independent	3/5 stars
The Quietus	4/5 stars
Uncut	3/5 stars

Strange Creatures was received mixed to positive reviews by most contemporary music critics. On review aggregator website, Metacritic, which normalizes music ratings, Strange Creatures received an average score of 67 out of 100, indicating "generally favorable reviews based on six critics".

Rhian Daly, writing for New Musical Express gave the album four out of five stars saying, that Strange Creatures is "a trip through a dark, weird, small town where outsiders stick out like sore thumbs. It's a daring record that bristles with ideas". Ciaran Steward also gave the album four stars out of five. In Steward's review for Dork magazine, Steward said that "Drenge have an unbridled ability to curate grunge with an anthemic tilt, and there are few bands able to conjure the atmospheres they regularly produce. This is surely the next step forward though as they’ve produced a deeply psychological release that takes no prisoners".

In a mixed review, the editorial staff for Q said "If Strange Creatures show a grander musical approach, then lyrically they're still fascinated by the bleak detail of everyday life, even if lads-night-out-gone-wrong vignette "Bonfire Of the City Boys" and sax-peppered deadpan horror story "Prom Night" flip the mundane into something more twisted". Q magazine ultimately gave the album three out of five stars.

Ellie Desborough, writing for The Quietus praised the expansive sound of instrumentation on the album saying that it helped the record feel more full. Desborough said that "This record is perhaps the first time we see Drenge exploiting the additions that were initially made to their live band, and exploring the expanded instrumentation to its full potential." Desborough gave the album four stars out of five.

== Personnel ==
Drenge

- Eoin Loveless – lead vocals, guitar
- Rory Loveless – drums
- Rob Graham – bass guitar

== Charts ==
Chart (2019)	Peak position
Scottish Albums (OCC)	52
UK Albums (OCC)	52
