= Drenge (album) =

Studio album by Drenge
- Released: 19 August 2013
- Genre: Garage rock, grunge, blues rock, punk rock
- Length: 37:21
- Label: Infectious

Drenge chronology
| Drenge (2013) | Undertow (2015) |

Professional ratings
Aggregate scores
| Source | Rating |
|---|---|
| Metacritic | (76/100) |
Review scores
| Source | Rating |
| NME | (8/10) |
| The Guardian | 4/5 stars |
| The Independent | 3/5 stars |
| Clash | (8/10) |

Drenge is the self-titled debut album by British band Drenge. It was released on 19 August 2013 on Infectious Music. The album reached #39 on the iTunes charts upon its release.

The album received mostly positive reviews with Clash Music describing the album's use of a "brand of raucous, nihilistic, grungy garage punk" as "thrilling", as well as stating that "The thrashing energy [heard in earlier tracks] does relent somewhat towards the end, yet this remains an impressive introductory manifesto."

Their single 'Bloodsports' was nominated for Zane Lowe's 2013 Top 100 Hottest Records.

The artwork for this album features a photograph of Wardsend Cemetery in Sheffield and a nearby scrapyard.

== Track listing ==
From iTunes.

| No. | Title | Length |
|---|---|---|
| 1. | "People in Love Make Me Feel Yuck" | 1:50 |
| 2. | "Dogmeat" | 2:22 |
| 3. | "I Want to Break You in Half" | 1:51 |
| 4. | "Bloodsports" | 2:32 |
| 5. | "Backwaters" | 3:12 |
| 6. | "Gun Crazy" | 2:06 |
| 7. | "Face Like a Skull" | 3:32 |
| 8. | "I Don't Want to Make Love to You" | 2:48 |
| 9. | "Nothing" | 3:40 |
| 10. | "Bye Bye Bao Bao" | 1:10 |
| 11. | "Let's Pretend" | 8:03 |
| 12. | "Fuckabout" | 4:15 |
