= Drenge (band) =

English rock band

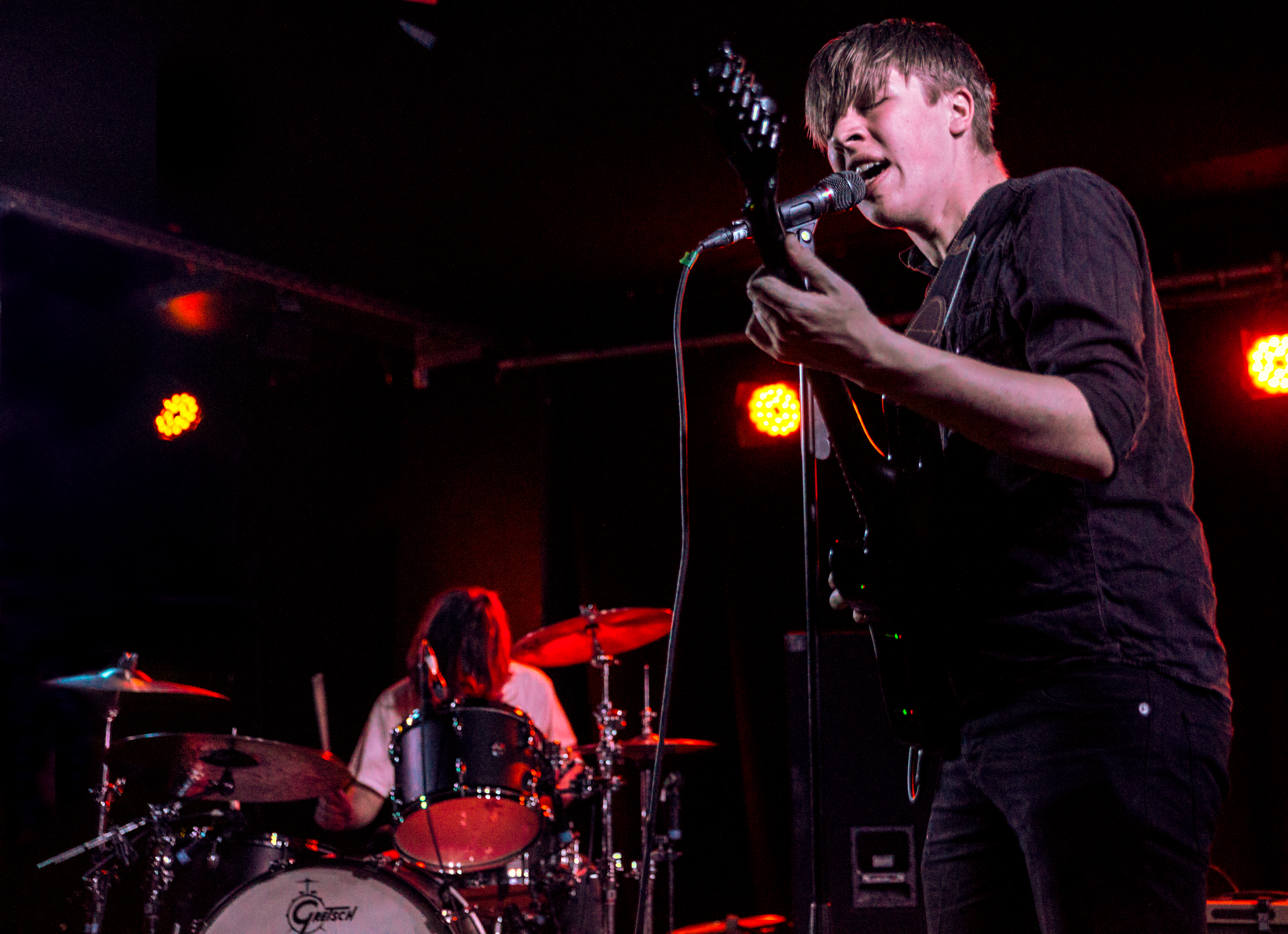
- Drenge in 2014

Background information
- Origin: Castleton, Derbyshire, England
- Genres: Garage rock; garage punk; indie rock; grunge; blues rock
- Years active: 2010–2020
- Label: Infectious
- Members: Eoin Loveless; Rory Loveless; Rob Graham
- Website: www.drenge.co.uk

Drenge was an English three-piece rock band made up of Eoin Loveless on guitar and vocals, his younger brother Rory on drums, and Rob Graham on bass. The brothers grew up in Castleton, Derbyshire, where they formed the band in 2010, relocating to Sheffield in 2014. They released three albums; Drenge (2013), Undertow (2015), and Strange Creatures (2019).

== Background ==
=== Formation (2010–2012) ===
Eoin Loveless became interested in playing music through post-punk revival bands like the Libertines, Bloc Party and Arctic Monkeys. Soon, he believed "that whole scene kind of ate itself", and instead found interest in going to Leeds for DIY shows. At these shows, he witnessed performances by Pulled Apart by Horses, the Eighties Matchbox B-Line Disaster and the Hipshakes, and was inspired to form a band. Taking on vocal and guitar duties, he founded Drenge alongside his brothers Rory Loveless on drums. They officially formed in Castleton, Derbyshire, in 2010. They took their name from the Danish word "drenge" meaning "boys". Of the name they stated that it sounded like something "that would sound like a noise that we would be playing on stage". When Eoin began studying film at York University, the brothers planned to breakup and began booking their final show. However, Eoin instead dropped out of university after a year in order to focus on Drenge full-time.

=== Drenge (2012–2015) ===
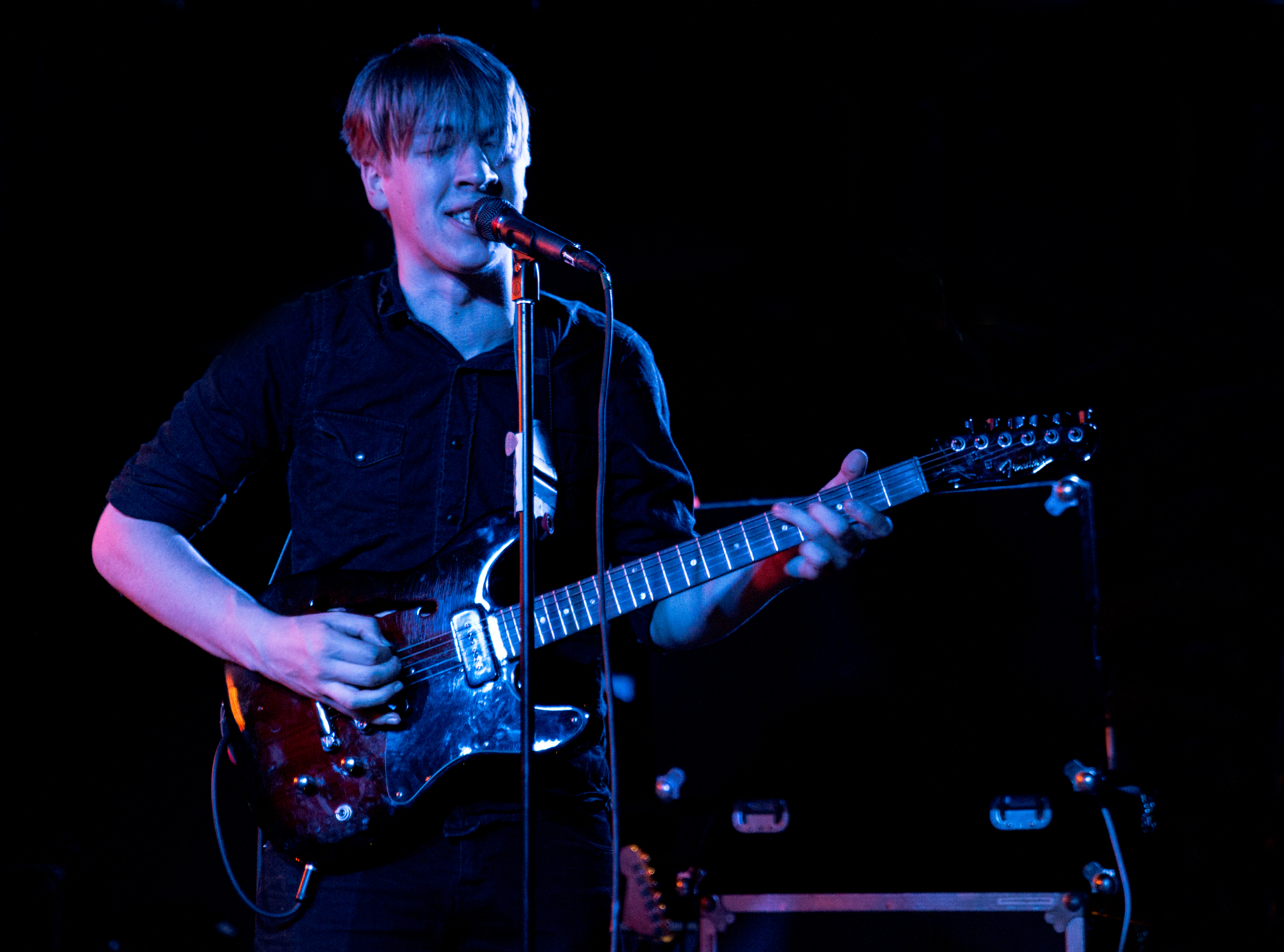
Eoin Loveless, 2014, Munich

In September 2012, they entered the studio in order to record an EP, however they found themself with an album-length of material. In January 2013, Drenge, who had a small following then, was picked up by national media when The Guardian's Paul Lester featured them in his "New Band of the Week" column. On 4 March 2013, Drenge released their debut single "Bloodsports" through Infectious Music. The band rose to further prominence seven months later following the resignation of Labour MP Tom Watson from the Shadow Cabinet in July 2013. In his resignation letter on his blog, Watson wrote: "Be that great Labour leader that you can be, but try to have a real life too. And if you want to see an awesome band, I recommend Drenge." This led to a wave of interest from various publications and programmes including BBC News, the Daily Telegraph and Question Time. They released a series of additional singles in the following months, culminating in their debut album Drenge, released on 19 August 2013. It peaked at number 42 on the Official Charts. The album was made of the material recorded in September 2012.

Drenge has toured extensively in the UK and has appeared at Glastonbury Festival, Latitude Festival, and Reading and Leeds Festival. They have also toured with Californian duo Deap Vally, including an appearance close to their hometown at Sheffield's Queens Social Club. They also toured with the British band Peace in late 2013. They played a headline tour in the first half of 2014, as well as playing at many festivals over the summer of 2014, including Reading and Leeds, Glastonbury and T in the Park. After the tour, they relocated to Sheffield, South Yorkshire.

Around this time, Drenge toured the UK alongside American punk band Radkey, appeared on Later... with Jools Holland, and their single "Bloodsports" was used for an advert for British TV show Misfits. On 27 January 2015, they made their US network television début on the Late Show with David Letterman.

=== Undertow and Strange Creatures (2015–2020) ===
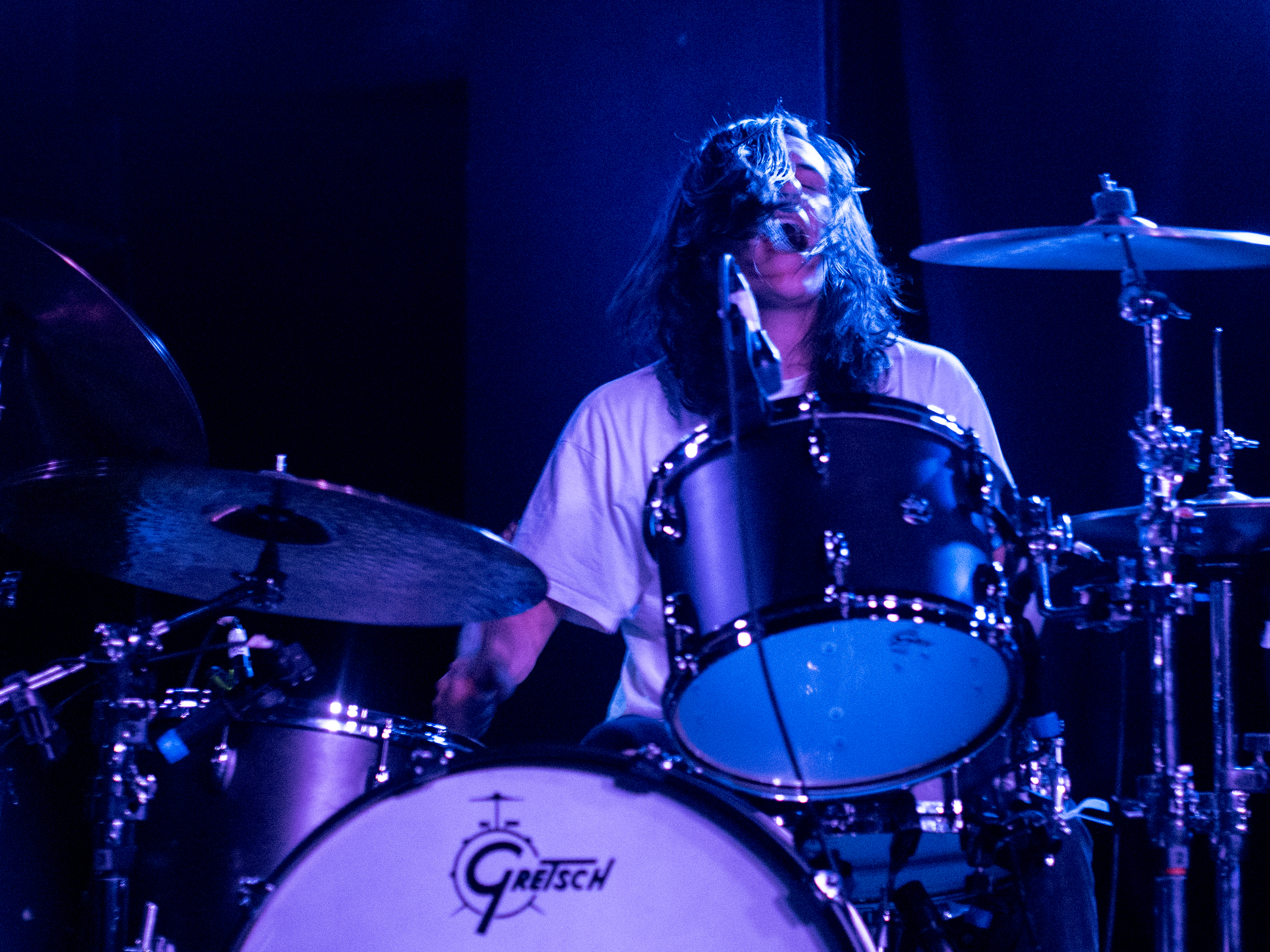
Rory Loveless, 2014, Munich

On 25 February, they released the single "We Can Do What We Want", followed by "Favourite Son" on 25 March. Both were a part of their the band's second album, Undertow, which was released on 6 April and debuted at number 14 on the UK Albums Chart. On 21 May, they released the single "Running Wild". In 2015, they ceased touring in order to write their next album and readjust to non-touring life. While writing, they hired Rob Graham as bassist. In the following years, they performed intimate shows around Sheffield under pseudonyms in order to test their new songs.

In February 2018, after a three-year hiatus, the band announced a new tour titled Grand Reopening, with dates in April and May of that year. On 2 July, they released the single "This Dance". On 5 October, they released the EP Autonomy. On 29 October, they release the four track EP Autonomy. On 5 November, they released the single "Bonfire of the City Boys", followed by "Never See the Signs" on 15 January 2019. This culimated in the 22 February release of their third album Strange Creatures.

== Musical style ==
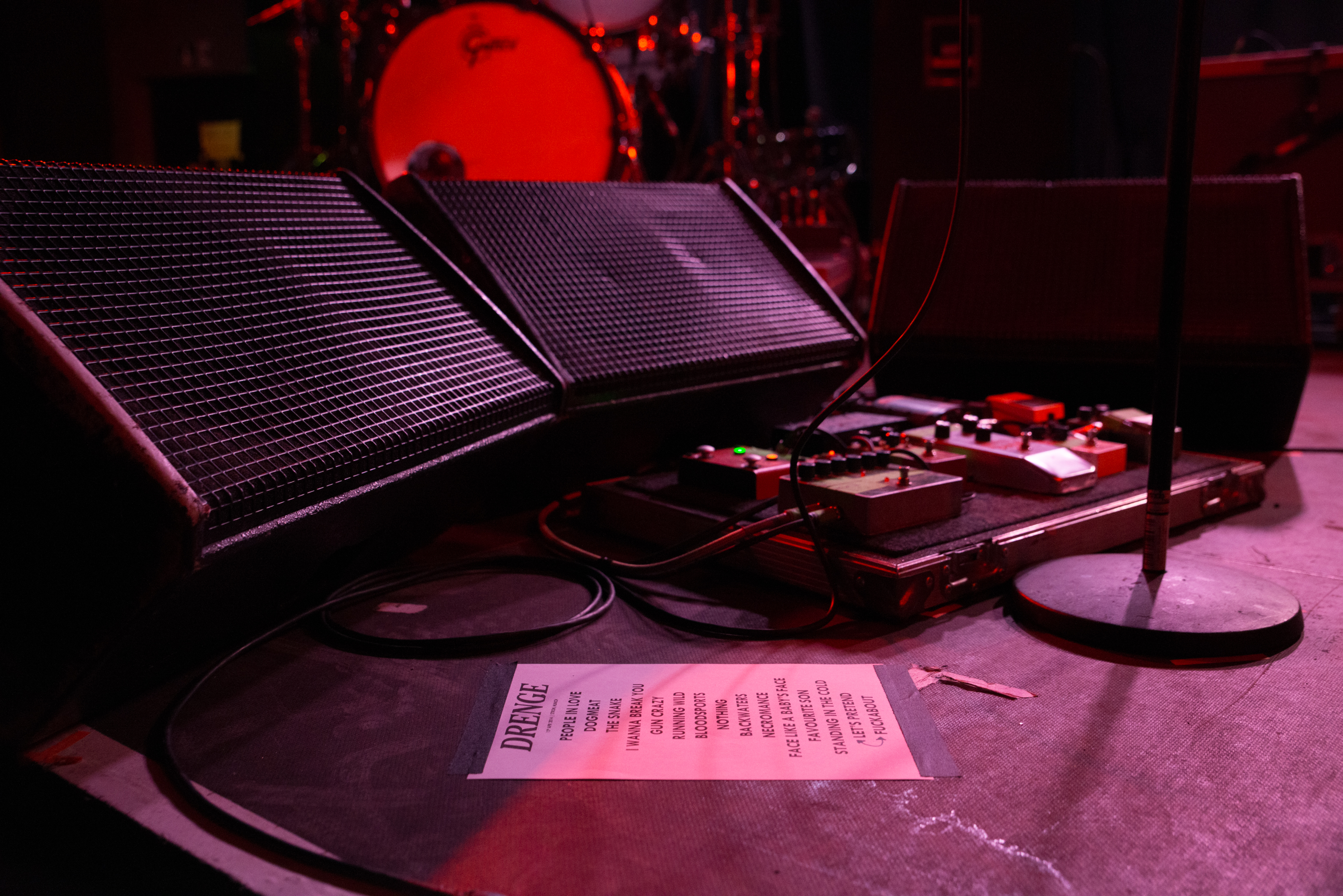
Songlist, 2014 in Munich

Critics categorised Drenge's music as garage rock, indie rock, grunge, garage punk and blues rock.

Eoin would often perform with two or three guitar amplifiers to make a wider sound. Of their music and live performances, Eoin stated "The recorded version is more like a Nevermind and the live version is more like a Bleach, I guess. There are two very different sides to the live and recorded versions of our band".

Alongside Royal Blood, Wolf Alice and Darlia, Drenge were a part of the 2010s grunge revival, a movement of dark, fuzz-using rock bands that arose in reaction against the perceived softness of the dominant indie rock styles of the 2000s.

Drenge cited influences including Pulled Apart by Horses, Nirvana, the Eighties Matchbox B-Line Disaster, Stray Cats, the White Stripes, Queens of the Stone Age, the Cure, the Cribs, the Von Bondies, the Vines, the Libertines, the Strokes, Smith Westerns, Black Lips, Wet Nuns, Sum 41 and Blink 182.

== Band members ==
Members

- Eoin Loveless – lead vocals, guitar (2010–present)
- Rory Loveless – drums, percussion, backing vocals (2010–present)
- Rob Graham – bass, backing vocals (2015–present)

== Discography ==
Studio albums

- Drenge (August 2013, Infectious)
- Undertow (April 2015, Infectious)
- Strange Creatures (February 2019, Infectious)
