= List of 2012 albums =

The following is a list of albums, EPs, and mixtapes released in 2012. These albums are (1) original, i.e. excluding reissues, remasters, and compilations of previously released recordings, and (2) notable, defined as having received significant coverage from reliable sources independent of the subject.

For additional information for deaths of musicians and for links to other music lists, see 2012 in music.

== First quarter ==
=== January ===
List of albums released in January 2012
Go to: January | February | March | April | May | June | July | August | September | October | November | December | Back to top
Release date	Artist	Album	Genre	Label	Ref.
January 1	Irène Schweizer	To Whom It May Concern: Piano Solo Tonhalle Zürich	Free improvisation	Intakt	
January 1	Raekwon	Unexpected Victory		Raekwon	
January 6	Alcest	Les Voyages de l'âme	Blackgaze, post-rock	Prophecy	
January 6	The Little Willies	For the Good Times	Country	Milking Bull, Parlophone	
January 6	Rick Ross	Rich Forever	Hip-hop	Maybach, Def Jam, Warner Bros.	
January 9	The Maccabees	Given to the Wild	Indie rock	Fiction, Polydor	
January 9	Todd Terje	It's the Arps		Olsen Records	
January 9	Trailer Trash Tracys	Ester		Domino, Double Six	
January 10	The Babies	Cry Along with the Babies	Indie rock	New Images	
January 10	KRS-One	The BDP Album	Hip-hop	6.8.2 Records	
January 10	Rae Spoon	I Can't Keep All of Our Secrets		Saved by Radio	
January 11	The Big Pink	Future This	Electronic rock, indie rock, shoegaze	4AD	
January 12	Waxahatchee	American Weekend	Indie folk, alternative country	Don Giovanni	
January 14	Schoolboy Q	Habits & Contradictions	West Coast hip-hop, gangsta rap	Top Dawg	
January 16	Diagrams	Black Light		Full Time Hobby	
January 16	Enter Shikari	A Flash Flood of Colour	Electronicore, post-hardcore	Ambush Reality	
January 16	Karol Gwóźdź	Tamte Czasy	Ambient	Psychonavigation Records	
January 16	Pinch	FabricLive.61	Electronic	Fabric	
January 16	Tribes	Baby		Island	
January 17	Ani DiFranco	¿Which Side Are You On?	Indie rock, folk rock	Righteous Babe	
January 17	Attack Attack!	This Means War	Metalcore, hardcore punk	Rise	
January 17	Himanshu	Nehru Jackets	Hip-hop	Greedhead	
January 17	Kathleen Edwards	Voyageur	Country, folk, rock	MapleMusic	
January 18	Nada Surf	The Stars Are Indifferent to Astronomy	Alternative rock	Barsuk, City Slang	
January 20	Aborted	Global Flatline	Death metal	Century Media	
January 20	Biohazard	Reborn in Defiance	Hardcore punk, rapcore	Nuclear Blast	
January 20	Pulled Apart by Horses	Tough Love	Alternative rock	Transgressive	
January 23	Deichkind	Befehl von ganz unten		Universal Music	
January 23	Lacuna Coil	Dark Adrenaline	Alternative metal, gothic metal	Century Media	
January 24	Chairlift	Something	Indie rock	Columbia	
January 24	Cloud Nothings	Attack on Memory	Post-hardcore, noise rock, emo	Carpark, Wichita	
January 24	Craig Finn	Clear Heart Full Eyes	Indie rock, country	Full Time Hobby	
January 24	Elizaveta	Beatrix Runs	Pop	Universal Republic	
January 24	Foxy Shazam	The Church of Rock and Roll	Hard rock, glam rock	I.R.S.	
January 24	Gangrene	Vodka & Ayahuasca	Underground hip-hop	Decon	
January 24	Gonjasufi	MU.ZZ.LE	Alternative hip-hop	Warp	
January 24	Ingrid Michaelson	Human Again	Indie pop	Cabin 24 Records, Mom + Pop	
January 24	John K. Samson	Provincial	Folk, indie	Anti-	
January 24	Kellie Pickler	100 Proof	Country	BNA, 19, XIX	
January 24	Lamb of God	Resolution	Groove metal, thrash metal, metalcore	Epic, Roadrunner	
January 24	mind.in.a.box	Revelations		Dreamweb Music, Metropolis	
January 24	Sean Paul	Tomahawk Technique	Dancehall pop, electropop	Atlantic	
January 24	Tim McGraw	Emotional Traffic	Country	Curb	
January 24	Various artists	Chimes of Freedom: The Songs of Bob Dylan Honoring 50 Years of Amnesty International	Rock, pop, folk	Amnesty International distributed by Fontana	
January 27	Iron Fire	Voyage of the Damned	Progressive metal, power metal, speed metal	Napalm	
January 27	John Williamson	The Big Red		Warner Music Australasia	
January 27	Lana Del Rey	Born to Die	Alternative pop, orchestral pop, baroque pop	Interscope, Polydor	
January 27	Tord Gustavsen Quartet	The Well	Jazz	ECM	
January 29	Die Antwoord	Ten$ion		Zef Recordz	
January 30	Pepe Deluxé	Queen of the Wave	Psychedelic rock, baroque pop, surf	Asthmatic Kitty, Catskills	
January 30	Ringo Starr	Ringo 2012	Rock	Hip-O, UM^{e}	
January 31	Aranda	Stop the World	Hard rock, post-grunge	Wind-up	
January 31	The Asteroids Galaxy Tour	Out of Frequency	Psychedelic pop	BMG	
January 31	Grimes	Visions	Synth-pop, dream pop, art pop	4AD, Arbutus	
January 31	Hit the Lights	Invicta	Pop-punk, indie rock, alternative rock	Razor & Tie, Sony Music, 3Wise Records	
January 31	Imperial Teen	Feel the Sound	Pop rock, alternative rock	Merge	
January 31	K'naan	More Beautiful Than Silence	Alternative hip-hop	A&M Octone	
January 31	Leonard Cohen	Old Ideas	Folk	Columbia	
January 31	Lincoln Durham	The Shovel vs. the Howling Bones	Roots rock, blues	Lincoln Durham, Rayburn Publishing	
January 31	Shigeto	Lineage		Ghostly International	

=== February ===
List of albums released in February 2012
Go to: January | February | March | April | May | June | July | August | September | October | November | December | Back to top
Release date	Artist	Album	Genre	Label	Ref.
February 1	Swallow the Sun	Emerald Forest and the Blackbird	Death-doom, melodic death metal, progressive metal	Spinefarm	
February 3	The Chemical Brothers	Don't Think			
February 3	Hermitude	HyperParadise	Australian hip-hop, electronica	Elefant Traks	
February 3	Ulrich Schnauss and Mark Peters	Underrated Silence	Indietronica, ambient techno	Bureau B	
February 3	Young Guns	Bones	Alternative rock, hard rock, alternative metal	Live Forever, Wind-up, PIAS	
February 6	Air	Le voyage dans la lune	Space rock	Virgin	
February 6	James Levy and the Blood Red Rose	Pray to Be Free		Heavenly	
February 6	Mark Lanegan Band	Blues Funeral	Alternative rock, blues rock	4AD	
February 6	Paul McCartney	Kisses on the Bottom	Jazz, traditional pop	Hear Music	
February 6	Therapy?	A Brief Crack of Light	Alternative rock, alternative metal	Blast Records	
February 6	The Twilight Sad	No One Can Ever Know	Post-punk revival, dark wave, industrial	FatCat	
February 7	Dierks Bentley	Home	Country	Capitol Nashville	
February 7	Dr. Dog	Be the Void	Indie rock, blues rock, neo-psychedelia	Anti-	
February 7	The Fray	Scars & Stories	Alternative rock, pop rock	Epic	
February 7	of Montreal	Paralytic Stalks	Psychedelic pop, progressive rock, experimental pop	Polyvinyl	
February 7	Sharon Van Etten	Tramp	Indie folk	Jagjaguwar	
February 7	Silverstein	Short Songs	Emo, hardcore punk	Hopeless	
February 7	Van Halen	A Different Kind of Truth	Hard rock, heavy metal	Interscope	
February 10	Eluveitie	Helvetios	Folk metal, melodic death metal	Nuclear Blast	
February 10	Motorpsycho and Ståle Storløkken	The Death Defying Unicorn	Progressive rock	Stickman Records, Rune Grammofon	
February 10	Soap&Skin	Narrow	Experimental	PIAS	
February 13	Burial	Kindred	Dubstep, 2-step garage	Hyperdub	
February 13	Emeli Sandé	Our Version of Events	R&B, soul, pop	Virgin, EMI	
February 13	Field Music	Plumb	Indie rock	Memphis Industries	
February 13	Goatwhore	Blood for the Master	Blackened death metal	Metal Blade	
February 14	Beneath the Massacre	Incongruous			
February 14	Earth	Angels of Darkness, Demons of Light II	Experimental rock, post-rock	Southern Lord Records	
February 14	Edyta Górniak	My	R&B, pop	Anaconda Productions	
February 14	John Talabot	Fin	House	Permanent Vacation	
February 14	Poliça	Give You the Ghost	Art pop, indie pop	Totally Gross National Product	
February 15	Soen	Cognitive	Progressive metal, Progressive rock	Spinefarm	
February 20	Band of Skulls	Sweet Sour	Alternative rock, blues rock, hard rock	Electric Blues Recordings, PIAS, Vagrant	
February 20	Nanci Griffith	Intersection		Proper, Hell No	
February 20	Sinéad O'Connor	How About I Be Me (and You Be You)?	Alternative rock	Shamrock Solutions, One Little Indian	
February 20	Tindersticks	The Something Rain	Art rock, chamber pop	Lucky Dog Recordings, City Slang, Constellation	
February 21	Apparatjik	Square Peg in a Round Hole	Experimental, Alternative rock, electronic rock	Meta Merge Un	
February 21	BBU	Bell Hooks	Hip-hop	Mishka, Mad Decent	
February 21	Busdriver	Beaus$Eros	Hip-hop	Fake Four Inc.	
February 21	Chiddy Bang	Breakfast	Hip-hop	Virgin, I.R.S., Regal	
February 21	The Cranberries	Roses	Alternative rock	Cooking Vinyl	
February 21	Cursive	I Am Gemini	Post-hardcore, indie rock	Saddle Creek, Big Scary Monsters	
February 21	Dustin Wong	Dreams Say, View, Create, Shadow Leads		Thrill Jockey	
February 21	Fun	Some Nights	Indie pop, pop rock	Fueled by Ramen	
February 21	Lambchop	Mr. M	Alternative country	Merge	
February 21	The Menzingers	On the Impossible Past	Punk rock, melodic hardcore	Epitaph	
February 21	Pallbearer	Sorrow and Extinction	Doom metal	Profound Lore, 20 Buck Spin	
February 21	Perfume Genius	Put Your Back N 2 It	Ambient, acoustic, pop	Matador	
February 21	Sleigh Bells	Reign of Terror	Noise pop	Mom + Pop	
February 21	Tyga	Careless World: Rise of the Last King	Hip-hop	Cash Money, Universal Republic, Young Money	
February 22	Ai	Independent	Dance-pop, R&B	EMI Music	
February 24	The Black Sorrows	Crooked Little Thoughts	Soul, blues	Head Records	
February 24	Dirty Three	Toward the Low Sun	Post-rock	Bella Union, Drag City	
February 24	The Ting Tings	Sounds from Nowheresville	Art pop	Columbia	
February 25	Halloween	Terrortory	Heavy metal	Motor City Metal Records, Pure Steel	
February 27	Napalm Death	Utilitarian	Grindcore, death metal	Century Media	
February 27	Primal Rock Rebellion	Awoken Broken	Heavy metal, progressive metal, alternative metal	Spinefarm	
February 27	The Safety Fire	Grind the Ocean	Progressive metal	Inside Out	
February 28	Corrosion of Conformity	Corrosion of Conformity	Stoner rock, sludge metal	Candlelight	
February 28	For King & Country	Crave	Contemporary Christian	Fervent, Curb	
February 28	Jay Farrar, Will Johnson, Anders Parker, and Yim Yames	New Multitudes	Folk rock	Rounder	
February 28	Kutless	Believer	Christian rock, Christian alternative rock	BEC	
February 28	Memoryhouse	The Slideshow Effect	Dream pop	Sub Pop	
February 28	Mouse on Mars	Parastrophics	IDM, wonky	Monkeytown	
February 28	Plants and Animals	The End of That	Indie rock	Secret City	
February 28	Robert Glasper Experiment	Black Radio		Blue Note	
February 28	Sent by Ravens	Mean What You Say		Tooth & Nail	
February 28	Shearwater	Animal Joy	Indie rock	Sub Pop	
February 28	Sister Sparrow & the Dirty Birds	Pound of Dirt	Garage rock	Modern Vintage Recordings	
February 28	Veil of Maya	Eclipse	Deathcore	Sumerian	
February 28	The Wooden Sky	Every Child a Daughter, Every Moon a Sun			
February 28	Xiu Xiu	Always	Art rock	Polyvinyl, Bella Union	

=== March ===
List of albums released in March 2012
Go to: January | February | March | April | May | June | July | August | September | October | November | December | Back to top
Release date	Artist	Album	Genre	Label	Ref.
March 2	Bill Frisell, Matt Chamberlain, Lee Townsend, Tucker Martine	Floratone II	Jazz	Savoy	
March 2	BOL / Westerhus / Snah	Numb, Number	Jazz	Gigafon	
March 2	Pond	Beard, Wives, Denim	Psychedelic rock, neo-psychedelia, indie rock	Modular	
March 5	Andrew Bird	Break It Yourself	Indie folk, baroque pop	Bella Union, Mom+Pop	
March 5	Big K.R.I.T.	4eva N a Day	Hip-hop, Southern hip-hop	Cinematic	
March 5	Caravan Palace	Panic	Electro swing	Wagram	
March 5	Katie Melua	Secret Symphony	Acoustic, blues, jazz	Dramatico	
March 5	Lionel Richie	Tuskegee	Country, R&B, pop	Mercury	
March 5	The Magnetic Fields	Love at the Bottom of the Sea	Indie pop, synth-pop	Merge, Domino	
March 5	The Stranglers	Giants	Punk rock, post-punk	earMUSIC	
March 5	Tomat	01-06 June	Noise, ambient, electronica	Monotreme Records	
March 6	Balkan Beat Box	Give		Nat Geo Music, Crammed Discs	
March 6	Bruce Springsteen	Wrecking Ball	Heartland rock, folk rock	Columbia	
March 6	Every Time I Die	Ex Lives	Metalcore, Southern rock	Epitaph	
March 6	Todd Agnew	How to Be Loved	CCM, worship, blues	Ardent, Fair Trade, Columbia	
March 6	Todd Snider	Agnostic Hymns & Stoner Fables	Folk rock	Aimless Records, Thirty Tigers	
March 8	Blaze Bayley	The King of Metal	Heavy metal	Blaze Bayley Recordings	
March 8	Nine Muses	Sweet Rendezvous	K-pop, dance-pop	Star Empire, LOEN	
March 9	Hilltop Hoods	Drinking from the Sun	Australian hip-hop	Golden Era	
March 12	Michael Kiwanuka	Home Again	Soul, folk	London, Polydor, Interscope	
March 13	Cannibal Corpse	Torture	Death metal	Metal Blade	
March 13	The Decemberists	We All Raise Our Voices to the Air (Live Songs 04.11–08.11)	Indie rock, folk rock, indie folk	Capitol, Rough Trade	
March 13	I See Stars	Digital Renegade	Metalcore, electronicore	Sumerian	
March 13	Mac DeMarco	Rock and Roll Night Club	Indie rock, soft rock	Captured Tracks	
March 13	Miike Snow	Happy to You	Indie pop, electropop	Downtown, Universal Republic	
March 13	Ruben Studdard	Letters from Birmingham	R&B	Shanachie	
March 13	Say Anything	Anarchy, My Dear	Pop-punk, emo	Equal Vision	
March 13	Spawn of Possession	Incurso	Technical death metal	Relapse	
March 13	Vijay Iyer	Accelerando	Jazz	ACT Music	
March 14	James Iha	Look to the Sky	Alternative rock	The End, EMI Music Japan	
March 16	Susanna	Wild Dog	Pop, jazz	Rune Grammofon	
March 19	Apologies, I Have None	London	Folk punk, punk rock	Household Name	
March 19	Mirrorring	Foreign Body	Ambient, psychedelic folk	Kranky	
March 19	Paul Weller	Sonik Kicks	Rock, alternative rock, electronic rock	Island	
March 19	Sharks	No Gods	Punk rock, alternative rock	Rise, Velvet Scene	
March 19	The Shins	Port of Morrow	Alternative rock	Aural Apothecary, Columbia	
March 20	Anti-Flag	The General Strike	Punk rock	SideOneDummy	
March 20	Brad Mehldau	Ode	Jazz	Nonesuch	
March 20	Diggy Simmons	Unexpected Arrival	Hip-hop, R&B	Atlantic	
March 20	Esperanza Spalding	Radio Music Society	Jazz	Heads Up International	
March 20	Lee Ranaldo	Between the Times and the Tides	Alternative rock, experimental rock	Matador	
March 20	Melanie Fiona	The MF Life	R&B	SRC, Title 9, Universal Republic	
March 20	Odd Future	The OF Tape Vol. 2	Alternative hip-hop	Odd Future	
March 20	S / S / S	Beak & Claw	Hip-hop, electronic, indie pop	Anticon	
March 20	Unsane	Wreck	Noise rock	Alternative Tentacles	
March 23	Madonna	MDNA	Pop, EDM	Interscope	
March 23	Meshuggah	Koloss	Extreme metal, progressive metal	Nuclear Blast	
March 23	Ministry	Relapse	Industrial metal, thrash metal	13th Planet	
March 26	The All-American Rejects	Kids in the Street	Alternative rock, power pop	Interscope, DGC	
March 26	Blood Red Shoes	In Time to Voices	Alternative rock	V2	
March 26	Chromatics	Kill for Love	Synth-pop	Italians Do It Better	
March 26	Iron Maiden	En Vivo!	Heavy metal	EMI	
March 26	Justin Townes Earle	Nothing's Gonna Change the Way You Feel About Me Now	Country, folk	Bloodshot	
March 26	Macy Gray	Covered	R&B, soul, rock	429	
March 26	The Mars Volta	Noctourniquet	Progressive rock, experimental rock	Warner Bros., Sargent House, Rodriguez-Lopez Productions	
March 26	My Darkest Days	Sick and Twisted Affair	Hard rock, post-grunge	604	
March 26	Quakers	Quakers	Hip-hop	Stones Throw	
March 26	Rocket Juice & the Moon	Rocket Juice & the Moon	Afrobeat, psychedelic funk	Honest Jon's	
March 26	The Used	Vulnerable	Emo, post-hardcore, alternative rock	Hopeless	
March 27	Before Their Eyes	Redemption		inVogue	
March 27	Clay Aiken	Steadfast		Decca	
March 27	Cowboy Junkies	The Wilderness	Alternative country	Latent	
March 27	Georgia Anne Muldrow	Seeds	R&B, soul, funk	SomeOthaShip Connect	
March 27	Janus	Nox Aeris	Alternative metal, nu metal	REALID Records	
March 27	Jay Brannan	Rob Me Blind	Folk, acoustic	Great Depression, Nettwerk	
March 27	Joan Osborne	Bring It On Home	Blues, R&B	Saguaro Road	
March 27	Joel Plaskett Emergency	Scrappy Happiness	Indie rock	MapleMusic	
March 27	OSI	Fire Make Thunder	Progressive rock, progressive metal	Metal Blade	
March 27	Overkill	The Electric Age	Thrash metal	Nuclear Blast	
March 27	Shinedown	Amaryllis	Hard rock, post-grunge	Atlantic, Roadrunner	
March 27	Stick to Your Guns	Diamond	Melodic hardcore, metalcore	Sumerian	
March 27	UFO	Seven Deadly	Hard rock, heavy metal	SPV/Steamhammer	
March 27	Wretched	Son of Perdition		Victory	

== Second quarter ==
=== April ===
List of albums released in April 2012
Go to: January | February | March | April | May | June | July | August | September | October | November | December | Back to top
Release date	Artist	Album	Genre	Label	Ref.
April 2	Clark	Iradelphic		Warp	
April 2	Evans the Death	Evans the Death		Fortuna Pop!	
April 2	The Futureheads	Rant	A cappella	Nul	
April 2	Graham Coxon	A+E	Indie rock, alternative rock	Parlophone	
April 2	Ian Anderson	Thick as a Brick 2	Progressive rock	Chrysalis, EMI	
April 2	Killing Joke	MMXII	Post-punk, industrial metal	Spinefarm, Universal	
April 2	Labrinth	Electronic Earth	Hip-hop, electronica, dubstep	Syco	
April 2	Lostprophets	Weapons	Hard rock	Epic, Fearless	
April 2	Nicki Minaj	Pink Friday: Roman Reloaded	Hip-hop, dance-pop	Young Money, Cash Money, Universal Republic	
April 2	Orbital	Wonky	IDM, drum and bass, wonky	ACP Recordings	
April 2	Willis Earl Beal	Acousmatic Sorcery	Outsider, soul, blues	Hot Charity, XL	
April 3	De La Soul's Plug 1 and Plug 2	Plug 1 & Plug 2 Present... First Serve	East Coast hip-hop, alternative hip-hop	Duck Down Music, PIAS	
April 3	Dr. John	Locked Down	Rock, funk, psychedelic rock	Nonesuch	
April 3	Great Lake Swimmers	New Wild Everywhere	Folk rock	Nettwerk	
April 3	High on Fire	De Vermis Mysteriis	Stoner metal, sludge metal, thrash metal	E1 Music	
April 3	Lukas Nelson & Promise of the Real	Wasted		Tone Tide Records	
April 3	Obie Trice	Bottoms Up	Hardcore hip-hop	Black Market Entertainment	
April 3	Our Lady Peace	Curve	Alternative rock, art rock	Warner Music	
April 3	Paul van Dyk	Evolution	Trance music, house music, progressive house	Vandit	
April 3	Rascal Flatts	Changed	Country	Big Machine	
April 3	Screaming Females	Ugly	Indie rock, punk rock	Don Giovanni	
April 3	Serengeti	Kenny Dennis EP	Hip-hop	Anticon	
April 3	Zammuto	Zammuto	Experimental, electronic	Temporary Residence Limited	
April 4	Alexandros	Schwarzenegger	Alternative rock, indie rock	RX-Records	
April 4	Fly	Year of the Snake	Jazz	ECM	
April 6	M. Ward	A Wasteland Companion	Pop, rock	Merge, Bella Union	
April 6	Monica	New Life	R&B	RCA	
April 9	Le1f	Dark York	Hip-hop	Greedhead, Camp & Street	
April 10	Black Dice	Mr. Impossible	Experimental, noise, electronic	Ribbon Music	
April 10	Bonnie Raitt	Slipstream		Redwing Records	
April 10	Cavo	Thick as Thieves	Hard rock, post-grunge	Eleven Seven Music	
April 10	Counting Crows	Underwater Sunshine (or What We Did on Our Summer Vacation)	Alternative rock, country rock	Cooking Vinyl	
April 10	Demon Hunter	True Defiance	Groove metal, metalcore	Solid State	
April 10	Halestorm	The Strange Case Of...	Hard rock, alternative metal, heavy metal	Atlantic	
April 10	Kishi Bashi	151a	Indie pop	Joyful Noise	
April 10	Lords of Acid	Deep Chills	Electro-industrial, electronic rock, acid techno	Lektroland, Metropolis, dPulse Recordings	
April 10	Manafest	Fighter	Christian rock	BEC	
April 10	Municipal Waste	The Fatal Feast	Thrash metal, crossover thrash	Nuclear Blast	
April 10	Pelican	Ataraxia/Taraxis	Post-metal	Southern Lord	
April 10	Upon a Burning Body	Red. White. Green.	Metalcore	Sumerian	
April 12	CFCF	Exercises		Paper Bag, Dummy Records	
April 12	Trembling Bells and Bonnie "Prince" Billy	The Marble Downs		Honest Jon's	
April 14	Joyce Manor	Of All Things I Will Soon Grow Tired	Indie rock, punk rock, lo-fi	Asian Man, Big Scary Monsters	
April 13	Future	Pluto	Hip-hop	A1, Freebandz, Epic	
April 13	Jason Mraz	Love Is a Four Letter Word	folk-pop, guitar pop	Atlantic	
April 13	Train	California 37	Rock, pop rock	Columbia, Sony Music	
April 15	DragonForce	The Power Within	Power metal	Essential Music, Roadrunner, JVC Victor	
April 16	Anathema	Weather Systems	Progressive rock, art rock	Kscope, The End	
April 16	Cancer Bats	Dead Set on Living	Hardcore punk, sludge metal	Distort	
April 16	Dean Blunt and Inga Copeland	Black Is Beautiful	Experimental, electronic	Hyperdub	
April 16	The Gaddabouts	Look Out Now!	Jazz pop, folk rock, Americana	RacecarLOTTA Records	
April 16	Spiritualized	Sweet Heart Sweet Light	Art rock, neo-psychedelia	Double Six	
April 17	Evans Blue	Graveyard of Empires	Alternative metal	Sounds+Sights	
April 17	Full of Hell / Code Orange Kids	Full of Hell / Code Orange Kids	Hardcore punk	Topshelf	
April 17	Loudon Wainwright III	Older Than My Old Man Now	Folk	2nd Story Sound	
April 17	Maps & Atlases	Beware and Be Grateful		Barsuk	
April 17	Neon Trees	Picture Show	Alternative rock, new wave	Mercury	
April 17	Thousand Foot Krutch	The End Is Where We Begin	Hard rock, nu metal, alternative metal	Fuel Music	
April 17	William Beckett	Walk the Talk EP		Yike Records	
April 18	Europe	Bag of Bones	Hard rock, blues rock	earMUSIC	
April 18	Paradise Lost	Tragic Idol	Doom metal, gothic metal	Century Media	
April 18	The Rasmus	The Rasmus		Universal	
April 18	The Soundtrack of Our Lives	Throw It to the Universe	Alternative rock	Parlophone, Yep Roc	
April 20	Rufus Wainwright	Out of the Game	Baroque pop	Decca, Polydor	
April 23	Actress	R.I.P.	Ambient, electronic, techno	Honest Jon's	
April 23	Feeder	Generation Freakshow	Alternative rock, post-grunge	Big Teeth Records	
April 23	Jack White	Blunderbuss	Blues rock	Third Man, XL, Columbia	
April 24	Alexz Johnson	Skipping Stone		Laydee Spencer Music Inc.	
April 24	The Dandy Warhols	This Machine		Beat the World, The End	
April 24	Death by Stereo	Black Sheep of the American Dream	Hardcore punk	Viking Funeral Records	
April 24	Death Grips	The Money Store	Experimental hip-hop, industrial hip-hop, hardcore hip-hop	Epic	
April 24	Deuce	Nine Lives	Rap rock	Five Seven Music	
April 24	Eve 6	Speak in Code	Alternative rock	Fearless	
April 24	Kip Moore	Up All Night	Country	MCA Nashville	
April 24	Kool A.D.	51	Hip-hop, alternative hip-hop	Greedhead, Mishka, Veehead	
April 24	Prong	Carved into Stone	Groove metal, thrash metal	Long Branch/SPV	
April 24	The Raveonettes	Into the Night		The Orchard	
April 24	Santigold	Master of My Make-Believe	New wave, reggae fusion, electronic	Atlantic	
April 24	Torche	Harmonicraft	Sludge metal	Volcom	
April 25	Kent	Jag är inte rädd för mörkret	Alternative rock, pop rock	Sonet, Universal	
April 25	Marilyn Manson	Born Villain	Industrial rock	Cooking Vinyl, Hell, etc.	
April 25	Norah Jones	Little Broken Hearts	Indie pop	Blue Note	
April 27	Marina and the Diamonds	Electra Heart	Pop, electropop, dance-pop	679, Atlantic	
April 27	Moonspell	Alpha Noir/Omega White	Melodic death metal, symphonic metal, gothic metal	Napalm	
April 27	Saint Vitus	Lillie: F-65	Doom metal	Season of Mist	
April 29	Brendon Small	Brendon Small's Galaktikon	Heavy metal	BS Records	
April 30	Father John Misty	Fear Fun	Indie rock	Sub Pop	
April 30	Mystery Jets	Radlands	Indie rock	Rough Trade	

=== May ===
List of albums released in May 2012
Go to: January | February | March | April | May | June | July | August | September | October | November | December | Back to top
Release date	Artist	Album	Genre	Label	Ref.
May 1	Apollo Brown and O.C.	Trophies	Hip-hop	Mello Music	
May 1	B.o.B	Strange Clouds	Alternative hip-hop, pop-rap	Grand Hustle, Rebel Rock, Atlantic	
May 1	Carrie Underwood	Blown Away	Country pop	Arista Nashville, 19	
May 1	Lone	Galaxy Garden	House, bass	R&S	
May 1	Pennywise	All or Nothing	Punk rock, melodic hardcore, skate punk	Epitaph	
May 1	Various artists	Avengers Assemble (Music from and Inspired by the Motion Picture)		Hollywood, Marvel Music	
May 4	Keane	Strangeland	Alternative rock	Island	
May 7	The Brian Jonestown Massacre	Aufheben	Neo-psychedelia	A Records	
May 7	The Cribs	In the Belly of the Brazen Bull	Indie rock, punk rock, alternative rock	Wichita	
May 7	Cover Drive	Bajan Style	Pop, R&B, hip-hop	Polydor	
May 7	Guillemots	Hello Land!	Baroque pop	The state51 Conspiracy	
May 7	JK Flesh	Posthuman		3BY3	
May 7	Meek Mill	Dreamchasers 2	Hip-hop	MMG	
May 7	The Proclaimers	Like Comedy	Blue-eyed soul	Cooking Vinyl	
May 7	Richard Hawley	Standing at the Sky's Edge	Alternative rock, chamber pop, neo-psychedelia	Parlophone, Mute	
May 8	Cattle Decapitation	Monolith of Inhumanity	Deathgrind, technical death metal	Metal Blade	
May 8	Infected Mushroom	Army of Mushrooms	Psychedelic trance, dubstep	Dim Mak	
May 8	Pixel	Reminder	Jazz	Cuneiform	
May 8	Silversun Pickups	Neck of the Woods	Alternative rock, indie rock, shoegaze	Dangerbird	
May 8	Wadada Leo Smith	Ten Freedom Summers		Cuneiform	
May 9	Iggy Pop	Après		Thousand Mile Inc	
May 11	Garbage	Not Your Kind of People	Alternative rock, electronic rock	Stunvolume	
May 11	Gossip	A Joyful Noise	Dance-punk, indie rock, synth-pop	Columbia	
May 11	Tenacious D	Rize of the Fenix	Comedy rock, hard rock, heavy metal	Columbia	
May 11	Zowie	Love Demolition	Pop, electro, punk	Sony BMG	
May 14	Adam Lambert	Trespassing	Pop, electropop, dance-pop	19, RCA	
May 14	Cornershop	Urban Turban		Ample Play Records	
May 14	Santana	Shape Shifter	Latin rock	Starfaith Records, Sony Music	
May 14	Simian Mobile Disco	Unpatterns	Electronic, tech house	Wichita	
May 14	Squarepusher	Ufabulum	Electronic, IDM	Warp	
May 15	Beach House	Bloom	Dream pop	Sub Pop	
May 15	Best Coast	The Only Place	Pop rock, jangle pop	Wichita	
May 15	Hot Water Music	Exister	Punk rock, post-hardcore	Rise	
May 15	Killer Mike	R.A.P. Music	Southern hip-hop	Williams Street	
May 15	Krizz Kaliko	Kickin' and Screamin'	Alternative hip-hop, dubstep	Strange Music	
May 15	Lisa Marie Presley	Storm & Grace	Roots rock	Universal Republic, XIX Recordings	
May 15	Meiko	The Bright Side	Indie folk, indie pop	Fantasy	
May 15	mewithoutYou	Ten Stories	Indie rock	Pine Street	
May 15	Shadows Fall	Fire from the Sky	Metalcore, thrash metal	Razor & Tie	
May 15	Willie Nelson	Heroes	Country, outlaw country	Legacy	
May 18	The Cult	Choice of Weapon	Hard rock	Cooking Vinyl	
May 18	Kris Allen	Thank You Camellia	Pop rock	RCA, 19	
May 18	Saint Etienne	Words and Music by Saint Etienne	Synth-pop, alternative dance, house	Heavenly, Universal UMC	
May 18	The Temper Trap	The Temper Trap	Indie rock	Liberation	
May 21	Burzum	Umskiptar	Viking metal	Byelobog Productions	
May 21	Paul Buchanan	Mid Air		Newsroom Records	
May 21	Soulsavers	The Light the Dead See	Alternative rock	V2, Mute	
May 21	Tom Jones	Spirit in the Room	Americana, blues	Island	
May 22	1982	2012	Hip-hop	ShowOff Records, Brick Records	
May 22	The Bunny the Bear	The Stomach for It	Metalcore, post-hardcore, synth-pop	Victory	
May 22	Chris Price	Homesick	Indie pop, garage rock	Price the Band LLC	
May 22	El-P	Cancer 4 Cure	Hip-hop	Fat Possum	
May 22	Grass Widow	Internal Logic			
May 22	Haley Reinhart	Listen Up!	Pop	19, Interscope	
May 22	Joey Ramone	...Ya Know?	Hard rock, punk rock, folk rock	BMG	
May 22	John Mayer	Born and Raised	Folk rock, country rock, Americana	Columbia, Sony Music	
May 22	MercyMe	The Hurt & The Healer	CCM	Fair Trade, Columbia	
May 22	Mount Eerie	Clear Moon	Indie rock, experimental	P. W. Elverum & Sun	
May 22	The Riverboat Gamblers	The Wolf You Feed		Volcom	
May 22	Slash featuring Myles Kennedy and The Conspirators	Apocalyptic Love	Hard rock, heavy metal	Dik Hayd International	
May 22	Smile Empty Soul	3's	Alternative metal, post-grunge	eOne Music	
May 22	Sonny Landreth	Elemental Journey		Landfall Records	
May 22	Tedeschi Trucks Band	Everybody's Talkin'	Rock, blues rock, blues	Sony Masterworks	
May 23	Kyary Pamyu Pamyu	Pamyu Pamyu Revolution	J-pop, bubblegum pop, electropop	Warner Music Japan	
May 23	Sigur Rós	Valtari	Post-rock, ambient, dream pop	Parlophone	
May 25	Alt-J	An Awesome Wave	Indie rock, folktronica	Infectious Music	
May 25	Ladyhawke	Anxiety	Pop rock	Modular	
May 25	Scissor Sisters	Magic Hour	Dance-pop, nu-disco	Polydor	
May 25	Ultravox	Brilliant	Synth-pop, new wave	EMI	
May 28	Architects	Daybreaker	Metalcore, progressive metalcore, post-hardcore	Century Media	
May 28	Jam City	Classical Curves	Electronic, UK bass	Night Slugs	
May 28	Paloma Faith	Fall to Grace		RCA	
May 28	Public Image Ltd	This Is PiL	Experimental rock, post-punk	PiL Official Ltd	
May 28	Ulver	Childhood's End	Art rock	Kscope	
May 29	Cadence Weapon	Hope in Dirt City	Alternative hip-hop	Upper Class	
May 29	Japandroids	Celebration Rock	Garage rock	Polyvinyl	
May 29	Marissa Nadler	The Sister	Folk, dream pop	Box of Cedar Records	
May 29	Melody Gardot	The Absence	Jazz, blues, bossa nova	Verve	
May 29	Regina Spektor	What We Saw from the Cheap Seats	Anti-folk, baroque pop, indie rock	Sire	
May 29	Sun Kil Moon	Among the Leaves	Indie folk	Caldo Verde	
May 29	The Walkmen	Heaven	Indie rock	Fat Possum, Bella Union	
May 29	White Lung	Sorry	Punk rock	Deranged	

=== June ===
List of albums released in June 2012
Go to: January | February | March | April | May | June | July | August | September | October | November | December | Back to top
Release date	Artist	Album	Genre	Label	Ref.
June 1	Alexandra Burke	Heartbreak on Hold	Pop, dance, R&B	RCA	
June 1	Delain	We Are the Others	Symphonic metal	CNR Music	
June 1	Dntel	Aimlessness	Electronic	Pampa Records	
June 1	The Hives	Lex Hives	Garage rock, garage punk	Disque Hives	
June 1	Kreator	Phantom Antichrist	Thrash metal	Nuclear Blast	
June 1	Patti Smith	Banga	Rock	Columbia	
June 1	Swearin'	Swearin'	Indie rock, pop-punk	Salinas	
June 4	Disclosure	The Face	Balearic beat, UK garage, dubstep	Greco-Roman Records	
June 4	Friends	Manifest!	Indie pop, indie rock	Fat Possum, Lucky Number	
June 4	Liars	WIXIW	Experimental rock	Mute	
June 4	Panopticon	Kentucky	Black metal, bluegrass, Americana	The Flenser, Handmade Birds	
June 5	The Beach Boys	That's Why God Made the Radio	Soft rock	Capitol	
June 5	Big K.R.I.T.	Live from the Underground	Hip-hop	Cinematic, Def Jam	
June 5	Chris Robinson Brotherhood	Big Moon Ritual	Blues rock	Silver Arrow Records	
June 5	Fear Factory	The Industrialist	Industrial metal, groove metal	Candlelight, AFM, Bodog	
June 5	Joe Walsh	Analog Man	Pop rock, soft rock	Fantasy	
June 5	Jukebox the Ghost	Safe Travels	Power pop	Yep Roc	
June 5	Kool Keith	Love and Danger	Hip-hop	Junkadelic Music	
June 5	Melvins	Freak Puke	Alternative rock	Ipecac	
June 5	The Mynabirds	Generals	Indie rock	Saddle Creek	
June 5	Neil Young & Crazy Horse	Americana	Rock	Reprise	
June 5	The Rocket Summer	Life Will Write the Words	Pop rock	Aviate Records	
June 5	A Silent Film	Sand & Snow	Alternative rock	Creative Media Investments	
June 6	Hot Chip	In Our Heads	Synth-pop	Domino	
June 8	Candlemass	Psalms for the Dead	Epic doom metal	Napalm	
June 8	Rush	Clockwork Angels	Progressive rock, hard rock	Roadrunner	
June 8	Usher	Looking 4 Myself	R&B, dance-pop	RCA	
June 10	f(x)	Electric Shock	K-pop, electropop, EDM	SM	
June 11	Amy Macdonald	Life in a Beautiful Light	Pop rock, soft rock	Melodramatic, Mercury	
June 11	iamamiwhoami	Kin	Electropop, synth-pop, experimental pop	To whom it may concern., Cooperative Music	
June 11	Kitty	Haha, I'm Sorry	Cloud rap	Kitty	
June 11	Maxïmo Park	The National Health	Indie rock	V2	
June 12	The dB's	Falling Off the Sky	Jangle pop	Bar/None	
June 12	Future of the Left	The Plot Against Common Sense	Post-hardcore	Xtra Mile	
June 12	Guided by Voices	Class Clown Spots a UFO	Indie rock	Guided by Voices Inc.	
June 12	Josh Turner	Punching Bag	Country	MCA Nashville	
June 12	Metric	Synthetica	Indie rock, new wave	Metric Music International	
June 12	Miss May I	At Heart	Metalcore	Rise	
June 12	Motion City Soundtrack	Go	Alternative rock	Epitaph	
June 12	SpaceGhostPurrp	Mysterious Phonk: Chronicles of SpaceGhostPurrp	Hip-hop, phonk	4AD	
June 15	Cheryl	A Million Lights	Pop, dance, R&B	Fascination	
June 15	Justin Bieber	Believe	Pop, R&B	Island, RBMG, Schoolboy	
June 16	Manowar	The Lord of Steel	Power metal	Magic Circle Music	
June 18	Joey Cape and Tony Sly	Acoustic Volume 2		Fat Wreck Chords	
June 19	Blood on the Dance Floor	Evolution	Dance-pop, electropop	Dark Fantasy Records	
June 19	Bobby Womack	The Bravest Man in the Universe	R&B, soul, neo soul	XL	
June 19	Broadway	Gentlemen's Brawl		Uprising	
June 19	Del the Funky Homosapien and Parallel Thought	Attractive Sin	Hip-hop	Parallel Thought LTD.	
June 19	Dirty Heads	Cabin by the Sea		Five Seven Music	
June 19	Fiona Apple	The Idler Wheel...	Art pop	Epic	
June 19	The Flower Kings	Banks of Eden	Progressive rock	Inside Out	
June 19	For All Those Sleeping	Outspoken		Fearless	
June 19	The Ghost Inside	Get What You Give		Epitaph	
June 19	Glen Hansard	Rhythm and Repose	Folk	Anti-	
June 19	Kenny Chesney	Welcome to the Fishbowl	Country	Blue Chair Records, Columbia Nashville	
June 19	Lit	The View from the Bottom	Alternative rock	Megaforce	
June 19	Peaking Lights	Lucifer		Mexican Summer, Weird World	
June 19	The Smashing Pumpkins	Oceania	Alternative rock, psychedelic rock, progressive rock	Martha's Music	
June 19	Whitechapel	Whitechapel	Deathcore	Metal Blade	
June 20	Asia	XXX	Progressive rock	Frontiers	
June 20	Linkin Park	Living Things	Alternative rock, electronic rock	Warner Bros.	
June 20	Maroon 5	Overexposed	Pop, pop rock	A&M Octone	
June 22	Deathspell Omega	Drought		Norma Evangelium Diaboli	
June 25	R. Kelly	Write Me Back		RCA	
June 26	Bosse-de-Nage	III	Black metal, blackgaze, math rock	Profound Lore	
June 26	Chris Cagle	Back in the Saddle	Country	Bigger Picture Music	
June 26	DIIV	Oshin	Dream pop	Captured Tracks	
June 26	Everclear	Invisible Stars	Alternative rock	eOne	
June 26	Gojira	L'Enfant sauvage	Progressive metal, technical death metal, groove metal	Roadrunner	
June 26	Little Feat	Rooster Rag		Hot Tomato Records	
June 26	Memphis May Fire	Challenger	Metalcore, post-hardcore	Rise	
June 26	The Offspring	Days Go By	Punk rock	Columbia	
June 26	A Place to Bury Strangers	Worship	Noise rock	Dead Oceans	
June 26	Ty Segall Band	Slaughterhouse	Garage rock, noise rock	In the Red	

== Third quarter ==
=== July ===
List of albums released in July 2012
Go to: January | February | March | April | May | June | July | August | September | October | November | December | Back to top
Release date	Artist	Album	Genre	Label	Ref.
July 2	Beak	Beak 2	Krautrock	Invada	
July 2	My Tiger My Timing	Celeste	New wave, pop, indie rock	Snakes & Ladders	
July 3	Abandon All Ships	Infamous	Metalcore, electronicore	Universal Music Canada, Rise	
July 3	Flo Rida	Wild Ones	Pop-rap, dance	Atlantic, Poe Boy	
July 3	Periphery	Periphery II: This Time It's Personal	Progressive metal	Sumerian, Century Media	
July 6	50 Cent	5 (Murder by Numbers)	Hip-hop	G-Unit	
July 10	Aesop Rock	Skelethon	Hip-hop	Rhymesayers	
July 10	Dirty Projectors	Swing Lo Magellan	Indie rock, art pop, experimental	Domino	
July 10	The Early November	In Currents	Alternative rock, indie rock	Rise	
July 10	Frank Ocean	Channel Orange	Alternative R&B, progressive soul, neo soul	Def Jam	
July 10	MadGibbs	Shame	Hip-hop, jazz	Madlib Invazion	
July 10	P.O.D.	Murdered Love	Alternative metal	Razor & Tie	
July 10	Saint Motel	Voyeur	Indie rock, power pop	OnThe Records	
July 10	Serj Tankian	Harakiri	Alternative rock	Reprise, Serjical Strike	
July 11	Azealia Banks	Fantasea	Melodic metalcore	Nuclear Blast	
July 13	Bury Tomorrow	The Union of Crowns	Melodic metalcore	Nuclear Blast	
July 13	Elton John and Pnau	Good Morning to the Night	Synth-pop, nu-disco, rock	Mercury, Casablanca	
July 13	Nas	Life Is Good	Hip-hop	Def Jam	
July 13	Public Enemy	Most of My Heroes Still Don't Appear on No Stamp	Hip-hop	Enemy Records, Spit Digital	
July 15	Psy	Psy 6 (Six Rules), Part 1		YG Entertainment, Universal Music, YGEX	
July 16	Jimmy Cliff	Rebirth	Reggae	UMe, Sunpower, Hip-O	
July 17	The Alchemist	Russian Roulette	Hip-hop	Decon	
July 17	Baroness	Yellow & Green	Sludge metal	Relapse	
July 17	The Contortionist	Intrinsic	Progressive metal	Good Fight	
July 17	KB	Weight & Glory	Christian hip-hop	Reach	
July 17	Matisyahu	Spark Seeker	Pop, hip-hop, electronic	Fallen Sparks Records	
July 17	Milo Greene	Milo Greene	Indie folk, folk rock	Chop Shop, Atlantic	
July 17	Pierce the Veil	Collide with the Sky	Post-hardcore, emo, pop-punk	Fearless	
July 17	Soul Asylum	Delayed Reaction	Alternative rock	429	
July 17	Tremonti	All I Was	Hard rock, speed metal	Fret12	
July 17	William Beckett	Winds Will Change	Pop rock	Yike Records	
July 18	Anna von Hausswolff	Ceremony		Kning Disk, City Slang, Other Music Recording Co.	
July 20	Joss Stone	The Soul Sessions Vol. 2	Soul, R&B	S-Curve, Stone'd	
July 20	Passion Pit	Gossamer	Electropop, dance-rock	Columbia	
July 20	Purity Ring	Shrines	Electropop	4AD	
July 23	The Gaslight Anthem	Handwritten	Punk rock, hard rock, heartland rock	Mercury	
July 24	Dark Time Sunshine	Anx	Hip-hop	Fake Four	
July 24	Emilie Autumn	Fight Like a Girl	Dark cabaret, electro-industrial	The Asylum Emporium	
July 24	Jeremiah Jae	Raw Money Raps	Hip-hop	Brainfeeder	
July 27	Testament	Dark Roots of Earth	Thrash metal	Nuclear Blast	
July 30	Rick Ross	God Forgives, I Don't	Hip-hop	Slip-n-Slide, Def Jam, Maybach	
July 30	The Unthanks	The Unthanks with Brighouse and Rastrick Brass Band	Folk	Rabble Rouser	
July 31	Serengeti	C.A.R.	Hip-hop	Anticon	
July 31	Toadies	Play.Rock.Music	Alternative rock	Kirtland	

=== August ===
List of albums released in August 2012
Go to: January | February | March | April | May | June | July | August | September | October | November | December | Back to top
Release date	Artist	Album	Genre	Label	Ref.
August 1	Farrah Abraham	My Teenage Dream Ended	Pop, outsider music		
August 7	Redd Kross	Researching the Blues	Alternative rock, power pop	Merge	
August 7	Sixpence None the Richer	Lost in Transition	Alternative rock, pop rock	Credential	
August 10	Mystery	The World Is a Game	Progressive rock	Unicorn Digital	
August 13	Black Light Burns	The Moment You Realize You're Going to Fall	Industrial rock, alternative rock, alternative metal	Rocket Science Ventures, RED Distribution	
August 13	James Yorkston	I Was a Cat from a Book	Folk	Domino	
August 13	Spector	Enjoy It While It Lasts	Indie rock	Fiction	
August 13	While She Sleeps	This Is the Six	Metalcore	Search and Destroy	
August 13	Why?	Sod in the Seed	Indie rock	City Slang	
August 14	2 Chainz	Based on a T.R.U. Story	Hip-hop, trap	Def Jam	
August 14	In This Moment	Blood	Metalcore, alternative metal, nu metal	Century Media	
August 14	Insane Clown Posse	The Mighty Death Pop!	Horrorcore, Detroit techno, dark ambient	Psychopathic	
August 14	Strong Arm Steady and Statik Selektah	Stereo Type	Underground hip-hop	Stones Throw	
August 14	Yellowcard	Southern Air	Pop-punk	Hopeless	
August 16	Ry Cooder	Election Special	American roots, blues rock	Perro Verde, Nonesuch	
August 17	Owl City	The Midsummer Station	Synth-pop, dance-pop, electropop	Universal Republic	
August 18	Parquet Courts	Light Up Gold	Indie rock	Dull Tools, What's Your Rupture?	
August 20	Ariel Pink's Haunted Graffiti	Mature Themes		4AD	
August 20	Bloc Party	Four	Alternative rock, art punk	Frenchkiss	
August 20	British Theatre	Dyed in the Wool Ghost			
August 20	The Darkness	Hot Cakes	Glam metal, hard rock	Wind-up	
August 20	Four Tet	Pink	Outsider house, future garage	Text	
August 20	Goat	World Music	Psychedelic rock	Rocket Recordings	
August 21	DJ Khaled	Kiss the Ring	Hip-hop	We the Best, Cash Money, Universal Republic	
August 21	Ivy Queen	Musa	Latin	Siente	
August 21	Lynyrd Skynyrd	Last of a Dyin' Breed	Southern rock, hard rock	Roadrunner	
August 21	Trey Songz	Chapter V	R&B	Songbook, Atlantic	
August 21	Yeasayer	Fragrant World	Experimental rock, psychedelic pop	Secretly Canadian	
August 22	Alanis Morissette	Havoc and Bright Lights	Soft rock	Collective Sounds, Columbia, SevenOneMusic	
August 24	Rita Ora	Ora	Pop	Roc Nation	
August 24	Tarja Turunen	Act I: Live in Rosario	Symphonic metal, alternative rock	earMUSIC	
August 25	Krallice	Years Past Matter	Black metal, progressive metal	Krallice	
August 27	Archive	With Us Until You're Dead	Trip hop, alternative rock	Dangervisit Records	
August 27	Dan Deacon	America	Electronic	Domino	
August 27	Divine Fits	A Thing Called Divine Fits	Indie rock, art rock	Merge	
August 27	Ensiferum	Unsung Heroes	Folk metal, melodic death metal, power metal	Spinefarm	
August 27	Katatonia	Dead End Kings	Progressive metal	Peaceville	
August 27	Marius Neset and Daniel Herskedal	Neck of the Woods	Jazz	Edition	
August 28	Beanie Sigel	This Time	Hip-hop	State Property, Ruffhouse, EMI	
August 28	The Chariot	One Wing	Metalcore, mathcore	Good Fight, eOne Music	
August 28	Circa Survive	Violent Waves	Indie rock, post-hardcore, progressive rock	Circa Survive, Sumerian	
August 28	Dwele	Greater Than One	R&B	RT Music Group, eOne	
August 28	Matchbox Twenty	North	Alternative rock, pop rock	Atlantic	
August 28	Minus the Bear	Infinity Overhead	Math rock	Dangerbird	
August 28	Morning Glory	Poets Were My Heroes	Punk rock	Fat Wreck	
August 28	The Orb featuring Lee "Scratch" Perry	The Orbserver in the Star House	Electronica, dub, IDM	Cooking Vinyl, The End	
August 28	Robert Cray	Nothin but Love	Blues	Provogue	
August 28	Slaughterhouse	Welcome to: Our House	Hip-hop	Shady, Interscope	
August 28	Swans	The Seer	Post-rock, experimental, noise rock	Young God	
August 28	Tamia	Beautiful Surprise		Plus 1 Music Group	
August 28	TobyMac	Eye on It	CCM	ForeFront	
August 29	Cat Power	Sun	Electronic, pop, dance-rock	Matador	
August 29	Mount Eerie	Ocean Roar	Indie rock, noise rock	P.W. Elverum & Sun	
August 31	Two Door Cinema Club	Beacon	Indie rock	Maison Kitsuné	

=== September ===
List of albums released in September 2012
Go to: January | February | March | April | May | June | July | August | September | October | November | December | Back to top
Release date	Artist	Album	Genre	Label	Ref.
September 3	Charlotte Church	One	Indie pop, alternative rock, folk rock	Alligator Wine	
September 3	Lil Wayne	Dedication 4	Hip-hop	Young Money, Aphilliates Music Group	
September 3	The Pineapple Thief	All the Wars	Progressive rock, alternative rock	Kscope	
September 3	The Vaccines	Come of Age	Indie rock, post-punk revival	Columbia	
September 4	Animal Collective	Centipede Hz	Neo-psychedelia, experimental rock	Domino	
September 4	Blu & Exile	Give Me My Flowers While I Can Still Smell Them	Hip-hop	Dirty Science, Fat Beats	
September 4	Bob Mould	Silver Age	Alternative rock	Merge	
September 4	Deerhoof	Breakup Song		Polyvinyl	
September 4	Imagine Dragons	Night Visions	Pop rock	Kidinakorner, Interscope	
September 4	Lecrae	Gravity	Christian hip-hop	Reach	
September 4	Mono	For My Parents		Temporary Residence Limited	
September 4	Propagandhi	Failed States	Melodic hardcore	Epitaph	
September 4	The Sheepdogs	The Sheepdogs	Southern rock, boogie rock, rock	Atlantic	
September 4	Two Gallants	The Bloom and the Blight	Indie rock	ATO	
September 5	Agnes	Veritas	Electro, disco	Roxy, Universal	
September 5	Pet Shop Boys	Elysium	Synth-pop	Parlophone	
September 5	The xx	Coexist	Indie pop	Young Turks	
September 7	Amanda Palmer and the Grand Theft Orchestra	Theatre Is Evil		8 Ft. Records	
September 7	The Amity Affliction	Chasing Ghosts	Metalcore, post-hardcore	UNFD, Roadrunner	
September 7	Elephant9 with Reine Fiske	Atlantis		Rune Grammofon	
September 7	Kasey Chambers & Shane Nicholson	Wreck & Ruin	Country	Liberation Music	
September 7	King Gizzard & the Lizard Wizard	12 Bar Bruise	Garage rock, garage punk, acid rock	Flightless	
September 7	Lacrimosa	Revolution	Gothic metal, gothic rock	Hall of Sermon	
September 7	The Presets	Pacifica	House, synth-pop, EDM	Modular	
September 7	The Script	#3	Pop rock, Hip-hop	Phonogenic	
September 10	Bob Dylan	Tempest		Columbia	
September 10	David Byrne and St. Vincent	Love This Giant	Art pop	4AD, Todo Mundo	
September 10	Gallows	Gallows	Hardcore punk	Venn Records	
September 10	Joe McElderry	Here's What I Believe	Pop	Decca	
September 10	ZZ Top	La Futura	Blues rock	American, Universal Republic	
September 11	The Avett Brothers	The Carpenter	Americana	American	
September 11	Billy Talent	Dead Silence	Punk rock, post-hardcore	Warner Music Canada, Last Gang	
September 11	Bucky Covington	Good Guys	Country	eOne	
September 11	Calexico	Algiers		Anti-	
September 11	Chris Robinson Brotherhood	The Magic Door	Blues rock	Silver Arrow Records	
September 11	Dave Matthews Band	Away from the World	Alternative rock	RCA	
September 11	Hoobastank	Fight or Flight	Post-grunge, alternative rock	Open E Entertainment	
September 11	Little Big Town	Tornado	Country	Capitol Nashville	
September 11	NOFX	Self Entitled	Punk rock	Fat Wreck Chords	
September 11	Thee Oh Sees	Putrifiers II	Garage rock, psychedelic rock, experimental	In the Red	
September 11	The Raveonettes	Observator		Vice	
September 12	John Frusciante	PBX Funicular Intaglio Zone	Art pop, electronica, experimental rock	Record Collection	
September 12	Richie Sambora	Aftermath of the Lowdown		Dangerbird	
September 14	Carly Rae Jepsen	Kiss	Dance-pop	604, Schoolboy, Interscope	
September 14	Kreayshawn	Somethin' 'Bout Kreay	Alternative hip-hop	Columbia	
September 14	Nelly Furtado	The Spirit Indestructible	Dance-pop, electronic, alternative pop	Interscope, Mosley	
September 14	Pink	The Truth About Love	Pop, pop rock	RCA Records	
September 14	Various artists	Cruel Summer	Hip-hop	GOOD, Def Jam	
September 17	Aimee Mann	Charmer	Pop rock	SuperEgo Records	
September 17	Brad Mehldau Trio	Where Do You Start	Jazz	Nonesuch	
September 17	The Gaslamp Killer	Breakthrough	Alternative hip-hop, electronic	Brainfeeder	
September 17	The Killers	Battle Born	Alternative rock	Island	
September 17	Mika	The Origin of Love	Pop	Casablanca, Barclay	
September 17	Oneohtrix Point Never and Rene Hell	Music for Reliquary House / In 1980 I Was a Blue Square	Electroacoustic, glitch	NNA Tapes	
September 17	Rival Sons	Head Down	Blues rock	Earache	
September 17	Skunk Anansie	Black Traffic	Alternative rock, hard rock	100% Records, earMUSIC, Carosello	
September 17	We Are the Ocean	Maybe Today, Maybe Tomorrow	Alternative rock, melodic hardcore	Hassle	
September 18	Becoming the Archetype	I Am	Metalcore, technical death metal	Solid State	
September 18	Ben Folds Five	The Sound of the Life of the Mind	Alternative rock	ImaVeePee Records	
September 18	Brother Ali	Mourning in America and Dreaming in Color	Hip-hop	Rhymesayers	
September 18	Corin Tucker Band	Kill My Blues	Alternative rock	Kill Rock Stars	
September 18	Devin Townsend Project	Epicloud	Alternative metal, hard rock, progressive metal	HevyDevy Records	
September 18	Dinosaur Jr.	I Bet on Sky	Alternative rock, indie rock	Jagjaguwar, PIAS	
September 18	Down	Down IV – Part I	Stoner metal, sludge metal	Roadrunner	
September 18	Dwight Yoakam	3 Pears	Country	Warner Bros. Nashville	
September 18	Go Radio	Close the Distance	Pop rock	Fearless	
September 18	Grizzly Bear	Shields	Indie rock, neo-psychedelia, baroque pop	Warp	
September 18	Homeboy Sandman	First of a Living Breed	Hip-hop	Stones Throw	
September 18	The Jon Spencer Blues Explosion	Meat + Bone	Punk blues, alternative rock	Bronze Rat	
September 18	Local H	Hallelujah! I'm a Bum	Alternative rock	SlimStyle Records	
September 18	Title Fight	Floral Green		SideOneDummy	
September 18	Woods	Bend Beyond	Indie folk	Woodsist	
September 19	Superfly	Force	Pop rock, blues	Warner Music Japan	
September 21	Deadmau5	Album Title Goes Here	Progressive house, electro house, glitch	Mau5trap, Ultra, Parlophone	
September 21	Green Day	¡Uno!	Punk rock, pop-punk, power pop	Reprise	
September 21	Mumford & Sons	Babel	Indie folk, pop	Island, Gentlemen of the Road	
September 21	No Doubt	Push and Shove	Ska, pop	Interscope	
September 22	Dragonette	Bodyparts	Electropop	Dragonette, Inc.	
September 22	Efterklang	Piramida	Indie pop	4AD	
September 24	Alphabeat	Express Non-Stop	Dance-pop, Europop	Copenhagen	
September 24	Lucy Rose	Like I Used To		Columbia	
September 25	As I Lay Dying	Awakened	Melodic metalcore	Metal Blade	
September 25	The Bad Plus	Made Possible	Jazz	E1 Music	
September 25	Dave Douglas Quintet	Be Still	Jazz	Greenleaf Music	
September 25	Legend	Witchcraft	Doom metal, hard rock	Nuclear Blast	
September 25	Lupe Fiasco	Food & Liquor II: The Great American Rap Album Pt. 1	Conscious hip-hop	Atlantic	
September 25	Miguel	Kaleidoscope Dream	Alternative R&B, contemporary R&B	Black Ice Records, ByStorm Entertainment, RCA	
September 25	Murs and Fashawn	This Generation	Hip-hop	Duck Down	
September 25	Wanderlust	Record Time		Sony Music, Zip Records	
September 25	Yoko Ono, Kim Gordon, and Thurston Moore	Yokokimthurston	Rock, experimental rock	Chimera Music	
September 28	Angband	Saved from the Truth	Power metal, progressive metal	Pure Steel	
September 28	Enslaved	RIITIIR	Progressive metal, black metal, Viking metal	Indie Recordings, Nuclear Blast	
September 28	Flying Lotus	Until the Quiet Comes	Electronica, electronic jazz, psychedelia	Warp	
September 28	Muse	The 2nd Law	Alternative rock, art rock, progressive rock	Helium 3, Warner Bros.	

== Fourth quarter ==
=== October ===
List of albums released in October 2012
Go to: January | February | March | April | May | June | July | August | September | October | November | December | Back to top
Release date	Artist	Album	Genre	Label	Ref.
October 1	AxeWound	Vultures	Metalcore	Search and Destroy Records	
October 1	Beth Orton	Sugaring Season	Folk	Anti-	
October 1	Death Grips	No Love Deep Web	Experimental hip-hop, industrial hip-hop	Third Worlds, Harvest	
October 1	Godspeed You! Black Emperor	'Allelujah! Don't Bend! Ascend!	Post-rock	Constellation	
October 1	John Cale	Shifty Adventures in Nookie Wood	Art rock	Double Six	
October 1	Lower Than Atlantis	Changing Tune	Arena rock	Island	
October 1	Public Enemy	The Evil Empire of Everything	Hip-hop	ENEMY Records	
October 2	Chris Brokaw	Gambler's Ecstasy	Alternative rock, post-rock	12XU, Damnably	
October 2	Cody Simpson	Paradise		Atlantic	
October 2	Diana Krall	Glad Rag Doll	Jazz	Verve	
October 2	DJ Drama	Quality Street Music	Hip-hop	eOne, Aphilliates, Powerhouse Productions	
October 2	Hammock	Departure Songs	Ambient, post-rock	Hammock Music	
October 2	The Hood Internet	FEAT	Electronic, hip-hop, indie rock	Decon	
October 2	Jackie Evancho	Songs from the Silver Screen	Classical crossover	Syco, Columbia	
October 2	Matt and Kim	Lightning	Indie pop	Fader, Universal	
October 2	The Mountain Goats	Transcendental Youth	Indie rock	Merge	
October 2	Papa Roach	The Connection	Nu metal, hard rock, electronic rock	Eleven Seven Music	
October 2	Three Days Grace	Transit of Venus	Alternative metal	RCA	
October 2	Tristan Prettyman	Cedar + Gold	Pop	Capitol	
October 2	Van Morrison	Born to Sing: No Plan B	Jazz, blues, pop	Blue Note	
October 5	Ellie Goulding	Halcyon	Electropop	Polydor	
October 5	Peter Buck	Peter Buck	Alternative rock	Mississippi	
October 5	Tame Impala	Lonerism	Psychedelic rock	Modular	
October 6	Jamey Johnson	Living for a Song: A Tribute to Hank Cochran	Country	Mercury Nashville	
October 8	All Time Low	Don't Panic	Pop-punk, alternative rock	Hopeless	
October 8	Converge	All We Love We Leave Behind	Mathcore, post-hardcore, hardcore punk	Epitaph	
October 8	Paws	Cokefloat!		FatCat	
October 8	Protomartyr	No Passion All Technique	Garage rock, post-punk, noise rock	Urinal Cake Records	
October 8	Sylosis	Monolith		Nuclear Blast	
October 9	A. C. Newman	Shut Down the Streets	Indie rock	Matador	
October 9	August Burns Red	August Burns Red Presents: Sleddin' Hill	Melodic metalcore, Christmas music	Solid State	
October 9	Between the Buried and Me	The Parallax II: Future Sequence	Progressive metal	Metal Blade	
October 9	The Birthday Massacre	Hide and Seek	Gothic rock	Metropolis	
October 9	Coheed and Cambria	The Afterman: Ascension	Progressive rock, progressive metal	Hundred Handed, Everything Evil	
October 9	A Fine Frenzy	Pines	indie rock	Virgin	
October 9	Kiss	Monster	Hard rock, heavy metal	UM^{e}	
October 9	Macklemore and Ryan Lewis	The Heist	West Coast hip-hop, alternative hip-hop, pop rap	Macklemore LLC, ADA	
October 9	MellowHype	Numbers	Alternative hip-hop	Odd Future, RED, Sony Music	
October 9	Metz	Metz	Punk rock	Sub Pop	
October 9	Ty Segall	Twins	Psychedelic rock	Drag City	
October 9	The Wallflowers	Glad All Over	Alternative rock	Columbia	
October 9	Why?	Mumps, Etc.	Indie rock	Anticon, City Slang	
October 9	Xzibit	Napalm	West Coast hip-hop, gangsta rap	Open Bar, EMI	
October 12	Bat for Lashes	The Haunted Man	Art pop, dream pop, synth-pop	Parlophone	
October 12	Brandy	Two Eleven	R&B	RCA, Chameleon Entertainment	
October 12	Leona Lewis	Glassheart		Syco, RCA	
October 12	Urthboy	Smokey's Haunt	Australian hip-hop	Elefant Traks	
October 15	Jake Bugg	Jake Bugg	Indie folk, indie rock	Mercury	
October 15	My Dying Bride	A Map of All Our Failures	Doom metal	Peaceville	
October 16	Anberlin	Vital	Alternative rock	Universal Republic	
October 16	Bill Laswell	Means of Deliverance	New-age	Innerhythmic	
October 16	Boys Noize	Out of the Black	Electronic	Boysnoize Records, Ingrooves	
October 16	Daphni	Jiaolong		Merge	
October 16	Dethklok	Dethalbum III	Melodic death metal	Williams Street	
October 16	Donald Fagen	Sunken Condos	Yacht rock, R&B	Reprise	
October 16	Jason Aldean	Night Train	Country pop, arena rock, Southern rock	Broken Bow	
October 16	Mac DeMarco	2	Soft rock	Captured Tracks	
October 16	Pinback	Information Retrieved		Temporary Residence Limited	
October 16	ZZ Ward	Til the Casket Drops	Blues rock, hip-hop, R&B	Hollywood	
October 19	Doro	Raise Your Fist	Heavy metal	Nuclear Blast	
October 19	Thy Art Is Murder	Hate	Deathcore	Halfcut	
October 22	Bridgit Mendler	Hello My Name Is...	Pop, soul	Hollywood	
October 22	Kendrick Lamar	Good Kid, M.A.A.D City	West Coast hip-hop, gangsta rap	Top Dawg, Aftermath, Interscope	
October 22	Killbot	Sound Surgery	Dubstep, electronic	Dim Mak	
October 22	Main Attrakionz	Bossalinis & Fooliyones	Hip-hop	Young One Records	
October 22	Stone Sour	House of Gold & Bones – Part 1	Alternative metal, hard rock, nu metal	Roadrunner	
October 22	Taylor Swift	Red	Pop, country	Big Machine	
October 22	Titus Andronicus	Local Business	Punk rock, indie rock	XL	
October 22	Vinnie Paz	God of the Serengeti	Hip-hop	Enemy Soil Entertainment, The Orchard	
October 23	Anaal Nathrakh	Vanitas	Black metal, grindcore, death metal	Candlelight	
October 23	Basement	Colourmeinkindness	Alternative rock	Run for Cover	
October 23	Black Moth Super Rainbow	Cobra Juicy	Indietronica	Rad Cult Records	
October 23	P.O.S	We Don't Even Live Here	Hip-hop	Rhymesayers	
October 23	The Sword	Apocryphon	Heavy metal, doom metal	Razor & Tie	
October 24	Kamelot	Silverthorn	Symphonic metal, power metal, progressive metal	SPV/Steamhammer, King	
October 24	Kylie Minogue	The Abbey Road Sessions	Orchestral pop	Parlophone	
October 26	Calvin Harris	18 Months	EDM	Deconstruction, Fly Eye, Columbia	
October 29	Cee Lo Green	Cee Lo's Magic Moment	Christmas, R&B	Elektra, Warner Bros.	
October 29	Madness	Oui Oui, Si Si, Ja Ja, Da Da	Ska, pop, 2-tone	Lucky 7, Cooking Vinyl	
October 29	Tracey Thorn	Tinsel and Lights	Christmas	Strange Feeling, Merge	
October 30	Andrew Bird	Hands of Glory	Indie folk	Mom + Pop	
October 30	Cody Chesnutt	Landing on a Hundred	Soul	Vibration Vineyard, One Little Indian	
October 30	The Coup	Sorry to Bother You	Alternative hip-hop	Anti-	
October 30	Esthero	Everything Is Expensive	Pop, jazz, folk	Esthero	
October 30	Flyleaf	New Horizons	Post-grunge, hard rock	A&M Octone	
October 30	Meek Mill	Dreams and Nightmares	Hip-hop	Maybach	
October 30	Neil Young & Crazy Horse	Psychedelic Pill	Psychedelic rock, hard rock, folk rock	Reprise	
October 30	Neurosis	Honor Found in Decay	Post-metal	Neurot, Relapse	
October 30	Sean Price	Mic Tyson	Hip-hop	Duck Down Music	
October 30	Thrice	Anthology	Alternative rock, post-hardcore	Staple Records	
October 30	Toby Keith	Hope on the Rocks	Country	Show Dog-Universal Music	
October 31	Ne-Yo	R.E.D.	Pop, dance-pop, R&B	Motown	

=== November ===
List of albums released in November 2012
Go to: January | February | March | April | May | June | July | August | September | October | November | December | Back to top
Release date	Artist	Album	Genre	Label	Ref.
November 2	Jesse Kaikuranta	Vie mut kotiin		Universal Music Finland	
November 2	Kerser	No Rest for the Sickest		Obese	
November 2	Mouse on Mars	WOW	Wonky, IDM, footwork	Monkeytown	
November 5	Focus	Focus X	Progressive rock	Eastworld Recordings	
November 5	Robbie Williams	Take the Crown	Pop rock	Island	
November 5	Rolo Tomassi	Astraea	Mathcore, progressive rock	Destination Moon	
November 5	Thee Faction	Singing Down the Government, or, The War of Position and How We're Winning It		Soviet Beret	
November 5	The Unthanks	Songs from the Shipyards	Folk	Rabble Rouser	
November 6	Aerosmith	Music from Another Dimension!	Rock	Columbia	
November 6	Alex G	Trick	Indie rock		
November 6	Apollo Brown and Guilty Simpson	Dice Game	Hip-hop	Mello Music	
November 6	E-40 and Too Short	History: Function Music	Hip-hop	Heavy on the Grind Entertainment, EMI	
November 6	E-40 and Too Short	History: Mob Music	Hip-hop	Heavy on the Grind Entertainment, EMI	
November 6	Lil Fame and Termanology	Fizzyology	Hip-hop	Brick Records	
November 6	Mr. Muthafuckin' eXquire	Power & Passion	Hip-hop	Universal Republic	
November 7	Boom Boom Satellites	Remixed	Electronica, rock	Gr8!	
November 7	Castle Face & Friends (Various artists)	The Velvet Underground & Nico	Noise rock, indie rock	Castle Face, Universal	
November 7	Crystal Castles	III	Electronica, witch house	Fiction, Polydor	
November 9	Anastacia	It's a Man's World	Rock, pop rock	BMG	
November 9	Christina Aguilera	Lotus	Pop	RCA	
November 9	Green Day	¡Dos!	Punk rock, pop-punk, garage rock	Reprise	
November 9	Lana Del Rey	Paradise	Baroque pop, trip hop	Interscope	
November 9	Mykki Blanco	Cosmic Angel: The Illuminati Prince/ss	Alternative hip-hop	UNO Records	
November 9	One Direction	Take Me Home	Pop	Syco, Columbia	
November 12	Deftones	Koi No Yokan	Alternative metal	Reprise	
November 12	Eivind Aarset	Dream Logic	Jazz	ECM	
November 13	9th Wonder and Buckshot	The Solution	Hip-hop	Duck Down	
November 13	Aaron Lewis	The Road	Country rock, alternative country	Blaster Records	
November 13	The Babies	Our House on the Hill	Indie rock	Woodsist	
November 13	Brian Eno	Lux	Ambient, electronic	Warp	
November 13	Guided by Voices	The Bears for Lunch	Indie rock	Guided by Voices Inc., Fire	
November 13	Motionless in White	Infamous	Industrial metal, gothic metal, metalcore	Fearless	
November 13	Murs and 9th Wonder	The Final Adventure	Hip-hop	Jamla	
November 13	Roc Marciano	Reloaded	Hip-hop	Decon	
November 13	Soundgarden	King Animal	Alternative metal, grunge	Universal Republic, Loma Vista, Vertigo	
November 13	Susan McKeown	Belong	Folk, world, pop rock	East River Records, Hibernian Records, Fish Records	
November 13	Travis Barker and Yelawolf	Psycho White	Rap rock, alternative hip-hop, horrorcore	LaSalle, Killer Distribution	
November 14	Heems	Wild Water Kingdom	Hip-hop	Greedhead	
November 15	Action Bronson and The Alchemist	Rare Chandeliers	Hip-hop	Vice	
November 16	Pitbull	Global Warming	EDM, dance-pop	RCA, Mr. 305	
November 18	Myka 9 and Factor Chandelier	Sovereign Soul	Hip-hop	Fake Four Inc.	
November 19	AC/DC	Live at River Plate	Hard rock	Columbia	
November 19	Example	The Evolution of Man	Hip-hop, rock, pop	Ministry of Sound	
November 19	Keyshia Cole	Woman to Woman	R&B	Geffen, Interscope	
November 19	Kid Rock	Rebel Soul	Rock and roll, blue-eyed soul	Top Dog, Atlantic	
November 19	Little Mix	DNA	Pop, dance-pop, R&B	Syco	
November 19	Phillip Phillips	The World from the Side of the Moon	Pop rock	Interscope, 19	
November 19	Rihanna	Unapologetic	Pop, synth-pop, R&B	Def Jam, SRP Records	
November 20	Code Orange Kids	Love Is Love/Return to Dust	Hardcore punk, metalcore	Deathwish	
November 20	The Evens	The Odds	Indie rock, post-punk, post-hardcore	Dischord	
November 20	Jessica Pratt	Jessica Pratt	Folk	Birth Records	
November 20	Tim Hecker	Instrumental Tourist	Ambient, drone, experimental	Software Recording Co.	
November 20	Woe, Is Me	Genesi[s]	Metalcore, post-hardcore	Rise, Velocity	
November 21	Lorde	The Love Club EP	Electronica, electropop	UMG, Virgin	
November 22	Alicia Keys	Girl on Fire	R&B	RCA	
November 23	Olly Murs	Right Place Right Time	Pop	Syco, Epic	
November 26	The Bryan Ferry Orchestra	The Jazz Age	Orchestral jazz, retro swing, trad jazz	BMG	
November 27	Ghostface Killah and Sheek Louch	Wu Block	Hip-hop	eOne	
November 27	Solange	True	Neo soul	Terrible	
November 30	Kesha	Deconstructed	Pop	RCA, Kemosabe	
November 30	Kesha	Warrior	Electropop, rock	RCA, Kemosabe	
November 30	Tulisa	The Female Boss	Grime, hip-hop, R&B	Island, All Around the World	

=== December ===
List of albums released in December 2012
Go to: January | February | March | April | May | June | July | August | September | October | November | December | Back to top
Release date	Artist	Album	Genre	Label	Ref.
December 3	Mylène Farmer	Monkey Me	Dance-pop, synth-pop, pop rock	Polydor	
December 3	Scott Walker	Bish Bosch	Experimental	4AD	
December 4	Wiz Khalifa	O.N.I.F.C.	Hip-hop	Atlantic	
December 7	Bruno Mars	Unorthodox Jukebox	Pop, R&B, rock	Atlantic	
December 7	Green Day	¡Tré!	Pop-punk, alternative rock, power pop	Reprise	
December 11	Big Boi	Vicious Lies and Dangerous Rumors	Hip-hop	Purple Ribbon, Def Jam	
December 11	The Game	Jesus Piece	West Coast hip-hop, gangsta rap	DGC, Interscope	
December 11	JK Flesh and Prurient	Worship Is the Cleansing of the Imagination	Industrial, noise	Hydra Head	
December 11	Lifehouse	Almería	Southern rock, country rock	Geffen	
December 11	Masta Killa	Selling My Soul	Hip-hop	Royal Lion, Nature Sounds	
December 14	Burial	Truant / Rough Sleeper	Future garage	Hyperdub	
December 18	Blink-182	Dogs Eating Dogs	Progressive punk		
December 18	T.I.	Trouble Man: Heavy Is the Head	Hip-hop, trap	Grand Hustle, Atlantic	
December 21	Flotsam and Jetsam	Ugly Noise	Thrash metal, progressive metal		
December 21	Minuit	Last Night You Saw This Band	Electronic	Dollhouse Records	
December 24	Wale	Folarin	Hip-hop		
