= Eyesore =

Eyesore may refer to:

- Eyesore, eye lesion, such as corneal ulcer
- “Eye Sore”, an episode of Hi Hi Puffy AmiYumi
- Eyesore (EP), by Skinlab
- "Eyesore" (song), by Janus
