= London (Apologies, I Have None album) =

Studio album by Apologies, I Have None
- Released: 19 March 2012
- Genre: Folk punk, punk rock
- Length: 37:19
- Label: Self-Released (CD); Household Name Records (vinyl)
- Producer: Peter Miles

Apologies, I Have None chronology
Two Sticks and Six Strings (2010)	London (2012)	Black Everything (2014)

Professional ratings
Review scores
Source	Rating
Big Cheese	4/5 stars
Bring The Noise	8/10 stars
Punknews.org	4.5/5 stars
Punktastic	4/5 stars

London is the debut studio album by British punk rock band Apologies, I Have None, released on 19 March 2012. The CD was self-released, and the vinyl by Household Name Records. The album's artwork was done by friend of the band, Emma Smith.

== Track listing ==
No.	Title	Length
1.	"60 Miles"	3:21
2.	"Sat In Vicky Park"	3:21
3.	"Clapton Pond"	3:55
4.	"Concrete Feet"	3:41
5.	"Still Sitting Tight"	3:23
6.	"Holloway or Anywhere"	4:38
7.	"The 26"	3:53
8.	"Joiners and Windmills"	4:19
9.	"Foundations"	3:45
10.	"Long Gone"	3:00
Total length:		37:16

== Personnel ==
- Dan Bond - vocals, guitar
- Josh Mckenzie - vocals, guitar
- PJ Shepherd - bass, vocals
- Joe Watson - drums, vocals

== Release history ==
London was released in the UK in 2012.

Country	Date	Label	Format	Catalogue number
United Kingdom	19 March 2012	Self-released	CD	AIHN3
United Kingdom	19 March 2012	Household Name Records	Vinyl	HAUS111LP
