= And Into Heaven Came the Night =

Studio album by Lincoln Durham
- Released: March 30, 2018
- Genres: Southern Gothic, psycho-blues revival
- Length: 31:54
- Label: Droog Records
- Producer: Lincoln Durham

Lincoln Durham chronology
Revelations of a Mind Unraveling (2016)	And Into Heaven Came the Night (2018)

And Into Heaven Came the Night is Lincoln Durham's fourth studio album, released on March 30, 2018 on Droog Records. Durham uses an array of instruments for the album, including guitar, cigar box guitar, pump organ, fiddle, and sheet metal. Most of the music on the album is generated by Durham, but he uses Chris Hausler for drums and mini Marvin on some of the tracks, and his wife Alissa provides some backing vocals.

Durham states about this album:

This one is a little less scathing and angry than the last. I feel it's a little more balanced, but again, it's still me writing mostly in terms of what's going on in my head. I've never – even though I'd like to be, for maybe more money — been great at the love song or the popular sing-a-longs. I write as therapy for myself. Each album is me in different places mentally, emotionally and sometimes physically. This one [album] is a little closer to me than some of the recent ones because I had to produce this one myself. Which was a new and very scary experience. My old producer, who was a long-time friend and the producer of my previous three [albums], he passed away last year. That sent me into uncharted territory and I decided to try to write and produce and record this myself... sometimes when I would go into the studio I might have the song fast and arranged this way and George [former producer] would say, 'What if I did it this way, and slower?' Sometimes it would become a different song, which is what you really want in the studio. But this one, for the first time, is basically every thing that I had in my head coming out onto the tracks. So it's a little more scary than usual. It's truly mine to fail.

== Track list ==
All tracks are written by Lincoln Durham

No.	Title	Length
1.	"Heaven"	3:16
2.	"Preacher"	2:37
3.	"Hate"	4:13
4.	"Grave"	3:50
5.	"Laugh"	4:41
6.	"Death"	3:27
7.	"Gnaw"	3:09
8.	"Feather"	3:07
9.	"Hero"	3:34
