= Celeste (album) =

Studio album by My Tiger My Timing
- Released: 2 July 2012
- Recorded: London, United Kingdom
- Genre: New wave, pop, indie rock
- Length: 37:01
- Label: Snakes & Ladders
- Producer: My Tiger My Timing

Singles from Celeste
- 1. "Endless Summer" Released: 11 August 2011; 2. "Written In Red" Released: 11 November 2011; 3. "The Gold Rush" Released: 12 June 2012; 4. "Let Me Go" Released: 12 November 2012

Professional ratings
Review scores
Source	Rating
The Line Of Best Fit	(7/10)
The 405	(7/10)
BBC Music	favourable
Drowned in Sound	(7/10)

Celeste is the debut album by new wave pop band My Tiger My Timing, released on 2 July 2012.

== Track listing ==
All songs written by My Tiger My Timing.

1. "Wasteland" – 3:36
2. "Written in Red" – 3:25
3. "The Gold Rush" – 4:12
4. "Let Me Go" – 3:38
5. "After School" – 3:49
6. "On My Record Player" – 3:33
7. "Endless Summer" – 3:27
8. "Honest" – 3:08
9. "Memories of Earth" – 3:59
10. "Your Way" – 4:14

== Personnel ==
- Anna Vincent – vocals, keyboards, programming
- James Vincent – bass, guitar, backing vocals
- Jamie Harrison – bass, guitar, backing vocals
- Gary Drain – drums, backing vocals
- Sebastian Underhill – synthesizer, keyboards, vocals
