= Karol Gwóźdź =

Polish multidisciplinary artist

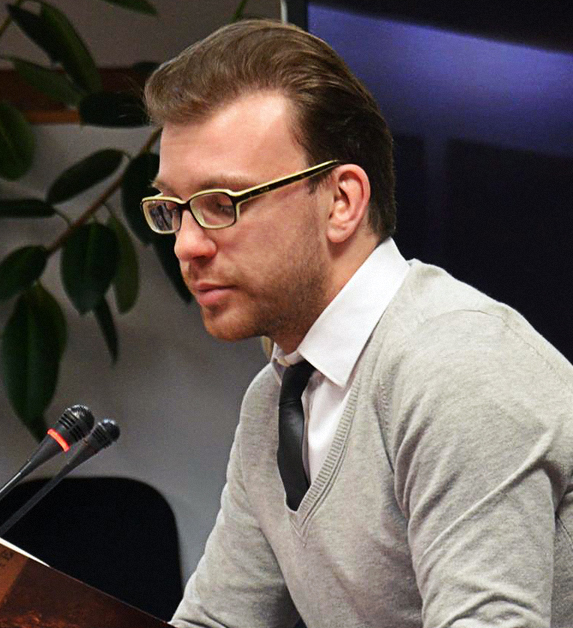

Background information
- Also known as: Nail
- Born: 2 April 1987 (age 39); Katowice / Silesia, Poland
- Genres: Electronica; Ambient; Modern classical; Drone; Electro; Techno
- Occupations: poet; writer; dj; musician; producer; photographer; graphic designer
- Labels: Psychonavigation Records, Dominance Electricity
- Website: karolgwozdz.com

Karol Gwóźdź (Polish: [ˈkarɔl ɡvuɕt͡ɕ]; born 2 April 1987 in Katowice) is a Silesian poet, writer, graphic designer, photographer, DJ, musician and producer of ambient and electronic music, also known as Nail (gwóźdź is Polish for nail). Promoter of Silesianness and Upper Silesian symbolism.

== Life and career ==
He was born in 1987 in Katowice, but since birth he is living in Siemianowice Śląskie, with which he is emotionally and generationally connected. He graduated the 5th Secondary School in the Sports School Complex in Siemianowice Śląskie in 2006 and completed majors: advertising organization and phototechnics.

Gwóźdź is a versatile artist, he is best known of the musical and literary spheres. He writes practically entirely in Silesian language, using Steuer's Silesian alphabet, although he occasionally also writes in Polish. Initially, he published in local newspapers, later also on the Silesian portal Wachtyrz.eu. He often emphasized that Silesianness need a change image to more modern, and himself as a writer, he proposed a neologism: mobilniok (en. mobile phone). He used to be a juror in literary competitions.

Although he is a photographer by education, professionally works as a graphic designer, designing e.g. ephemeras, brochures, books or logos; he collaborated among others with Ruch Chorzów for which he redesigned the club's crest for its second centenary, designed Adler (the club mascot), a captain's armband in the Upper Silesian colors, created a lot of badges, enamel pins and many other products, including several books.

=== Literature ===
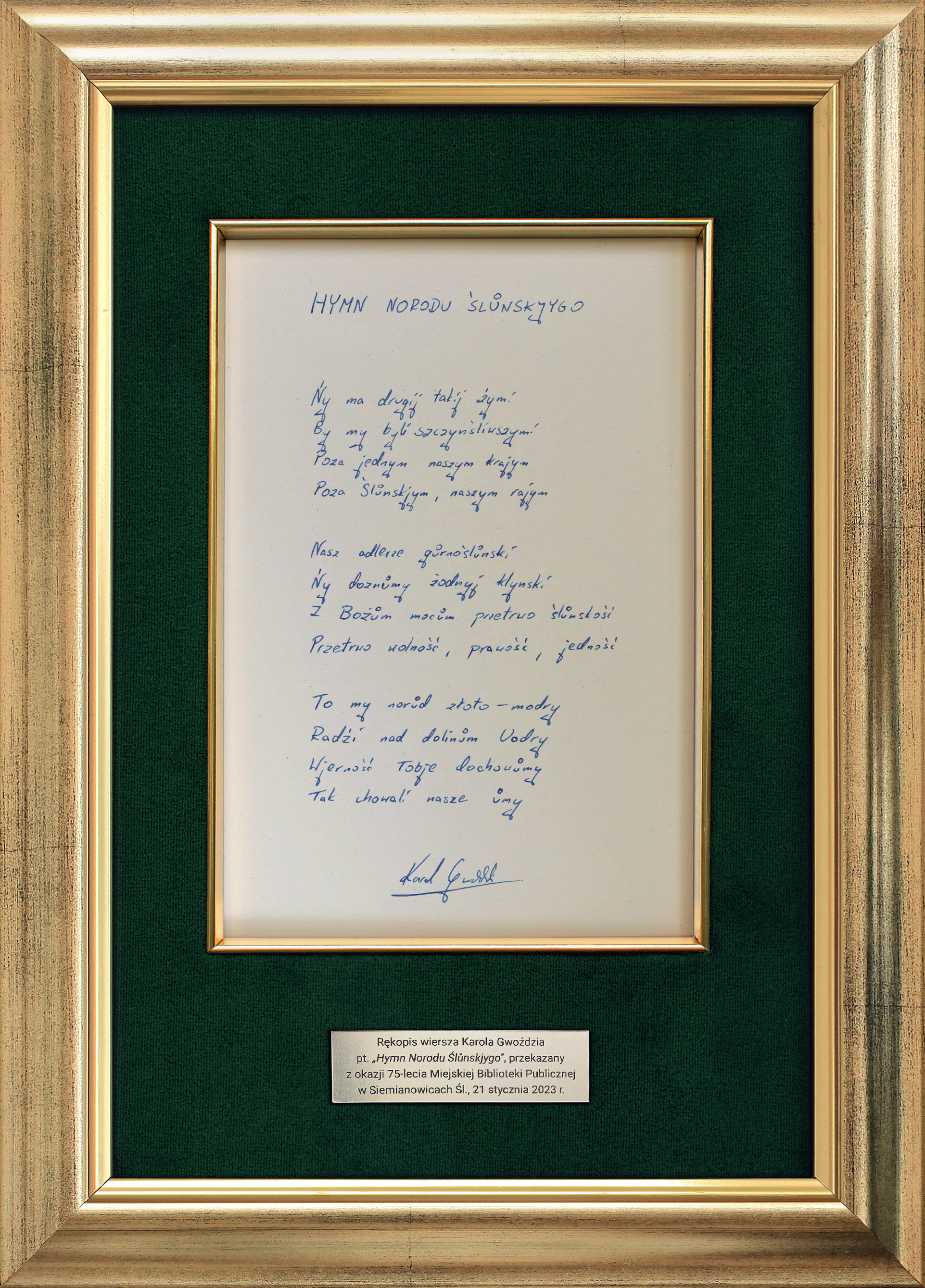
Manuscript of the poem "Hymn Norodu Ślůnskjygo" in the Library in Siemianowice Śl.

He made his debut in 2005 with the poem "Uůna" (en. She) in Gazeta Wyborcza and becoming a laureate of the first edition of the Bończyk Poetry Contest in Ruda Śląska. In 2010, was published his first book of poetry "Myśli ukryte" (en. Hidden thoughts), which includes "Hymn Norodu Ślůnskjygo" (en. Anthem of Silesian Nation), one of the most popular Silesian poem, whose manuscript is in the Public Library in Siemianowice Śląskie. In 2022 he enriched the anthology "Siemianowice, kere pamiyntomy" with the short story called "Za bajtla na Bytkowje..." (en. Childhood in Bytków), which is embellished with the so-called "mazuration", a rare linguistic feature of the speech of the native inhabitants of Siemianowice Śląskie. In 2024, "Myśli ukryte" was translated into Ukrainian, a landmark event for Silesian culture as the first translation of a Silesian-language publication into a foreign language.

=== Music ===
Karol Gwóźdź performing dj-set as Nail...

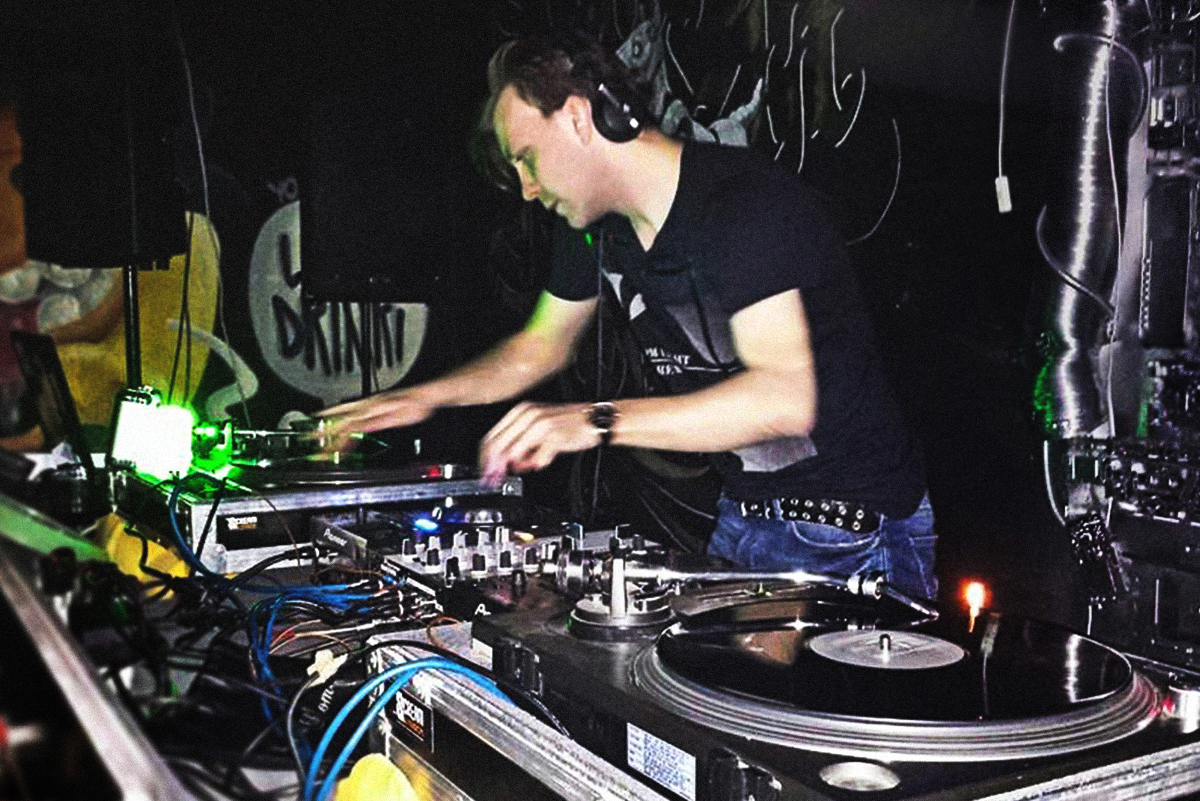
...during the festival in Mysłowice (March 28, 2015)...

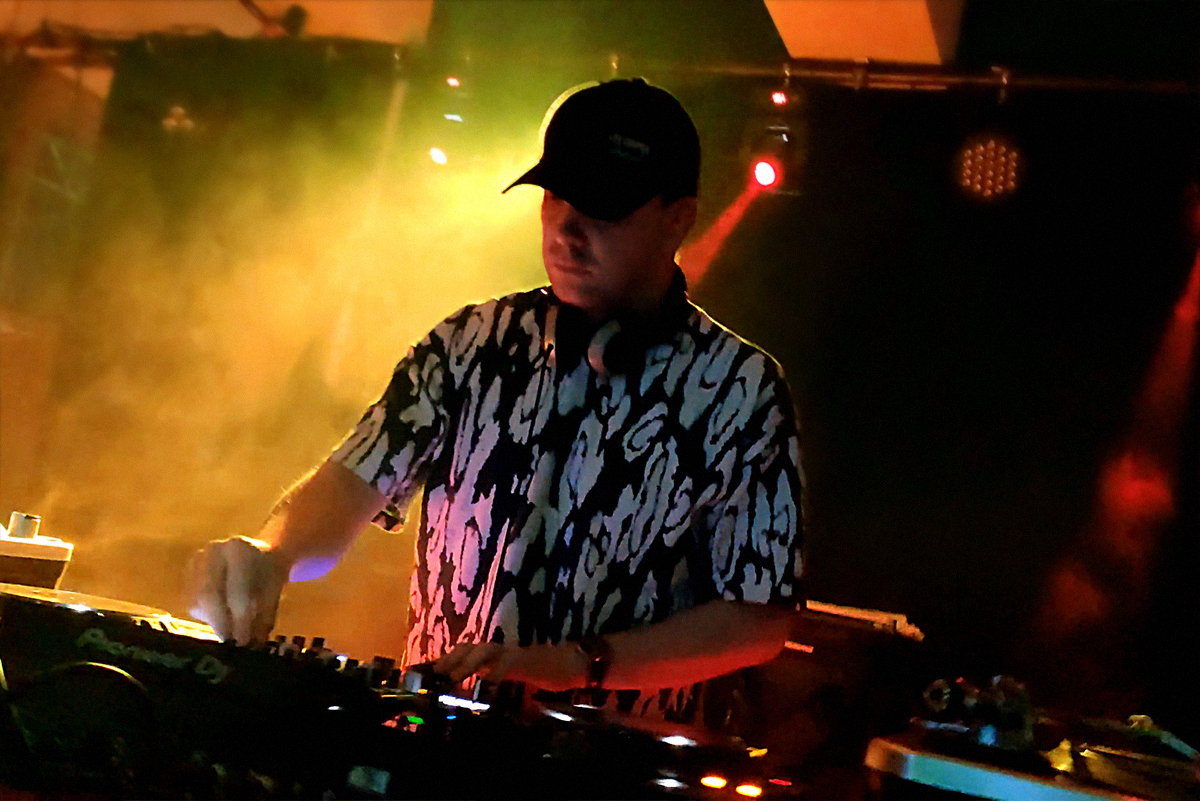
...and at the "Komin Music Cafe" club (April 15, 2022).

He began to enter the world of music in his early childhood, and over time, through his fascination with breakdance and dancing electric boogie, he discovered himself in electronic music. He started his DJ career at the age of 17, performing under the pseudonym Nail, mixing mainly electro, techno and breakbeat music, initially playing in legendary clubs in Silesia, and a little later already performing all around Poland. In 2012 he released his debut ambient album "Tamte Czasy", from which comes "Gůrnoślůnskje Tragedyje", a track used in the movie Beat Girl. In 2019 he released his first electro vinyl "Revelation" on the German label Dominance Electricity, classified according to the British record store Bleep, in the annual 20 Best Electro & Acid 12"s of 2019, as one of the best singles of 2019.

He was also the author of the event series Sex with the Machines and Zicherungi, taking place in the legendary INQbator Club in Katowice.

== Personal life ==
He is a declared Catholic and a supporter of Ruch Chorzów. He identifies himself as a representative of Silesian nationality. Involved in social causes, he has participated in charity actions for animals.
