= Black Everything =

EP by Apologies, I Have None
- Released: (United Kingdom) 12 May 2014
- Genre: Alternative rock, pop punk
- Length: 16:04
- Label: Beach Community

Apologies, I Have None chronology
London (2012)	Black Everything (2014)

Professional ratings
Review scores
Source	Rating
Punknews.org	4/5 stars
Stereoboard	4/5 stars

Black Everything is a four-track EP from the alternative rock band Apologies, I Have None.

It is the first Apologies, I Have None release without founding member Dan Bond who left the band in early 2014.

== Track listing ==
All music is composed by Apologies, I Have None

No.	Title	Length
1.	"Raging Through The Thick & Heavy Darkness Of A Bloodlust"	5:06
2.	"Two Bombs In A Box"	3:23
3.	"Coffee, Alcohol, Codeine, Repeat"	3:31
4.	"The Clarity Of Morning"	4:07
Total length:		16:04

== Personnel ==
Apologies, I Have None

- Josh Mckenzie - vocals/guitar
- PJ Shepherd - bass
- Joe Watson - drums
