= Wanderlust (American band) =

American power pop band

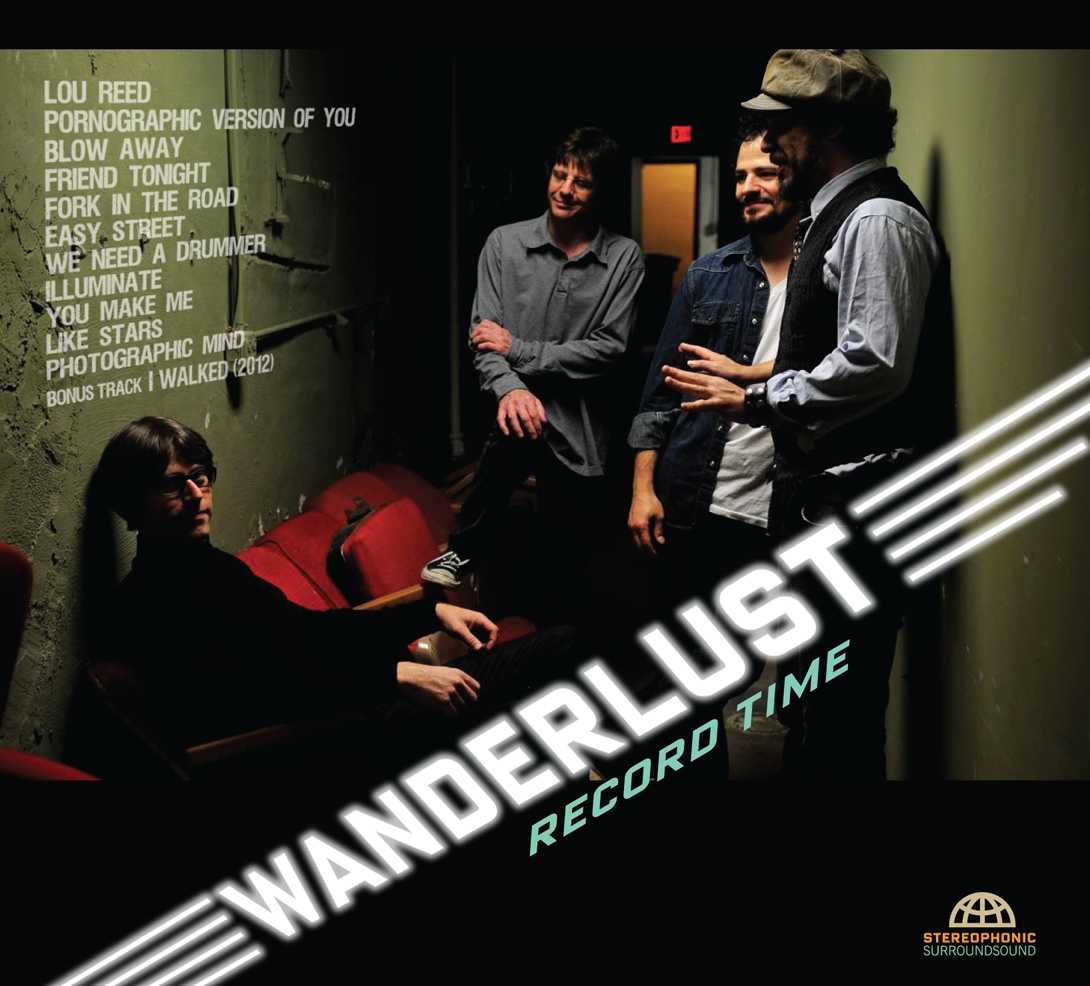
- Wanderlust "Record Time"

Background information
- Origin: Philadelphia, Pennsylvania, USA
- Genres: Power pop, Alternative rock
- Years active: 1992–1998, 2011–present
- Labels: RCA, Zip Records, Red Distribution
- Members: Scot Sax – vocals, guitar Rob Bonfiglio – vocals, guitar Mark Levin (AKA Mark Getten) – bass Jim Cavanaugh – drums
- Website: www.wanderlustfans.com

Wanderlust is an American power pop band of the mid-1990s based in Philadelphia, Pennsylvania.

== Formation ==
Scot Sax, a native of Philadelphia, had been playing and writing songs since the age of 13, and had actually performed with Rob Bonfiglio a number of times. The lineup was filled by rhythm members Mark Levin on bass and Jim Cavanaugh on drums, and Wanderlust was formed.

== Prize (1995) ==
In 1994, the band began recording a demo at Tongue & Groove Studios in Philadelphia with engineer Mike Musmano. Before the demo was completed the band was signed with RCA. The full length album, Prize, was released in April 1995 to positive critical reviews. In 1997 the band returned to the studio to record a second album, but was dropped from the label and the record was never completed. The unfinished second album was later released by Not Lame.

=== Track listing ===
1. "Wanna Feel New"
2. "Prize"
3. "I Walked"
4. "Troubled Man"
5. "Sundial"
6. "Coffee in the Kitchen"
7. "Before We Fade"
8. "Deepest Blue"
9. "Brand New Plan"
10. "Stage Name"
11. "Flash & Shadow"

== After Wanderlust ==
After the band's breakup, Scot Sax went on to form Bachelor Number One in 1999, which appeared on the American Pie soundtrack with the song "Summertime". He formed another band, Feel, in 2001 and has written or co-written songs for such artists as Faith Hill, Tim McGraw, and Jennifer Love Hewitt. In 2006 he worked with Sharon Little on her debut CD Drawing Circles and her major label release Perfect Time for a Breakdown (CBS Records, 2008). He now resides in Nashville and continues to release new music and produce documentaries as a filmmaker under the name Scot Sax Films.

Rob Bonfiglio went on to form The Better Days, later renamed The Skies of America, whose song "Shine" appeared on the soundtrack to the 2007 film Bridge to Terabithia. He also released a solo album called Bring on the Happy in 2008. Bonfiglio has been married to Carnie Wilson since 2000.

After leaving Wanderlust, Jim Cavanaugh was the drummer for a Philadelphia-based band, Swell Box, and has been with The Mighty Manatees since January 2007. He also produced the debut album by SugrHi.

Mark Levin, who now goes by the name Mark Getten, lives in the Los Angeles area and plays bass for AM. He also heads an experimental project band called Indignitaries.

== Record Time (2012) ==
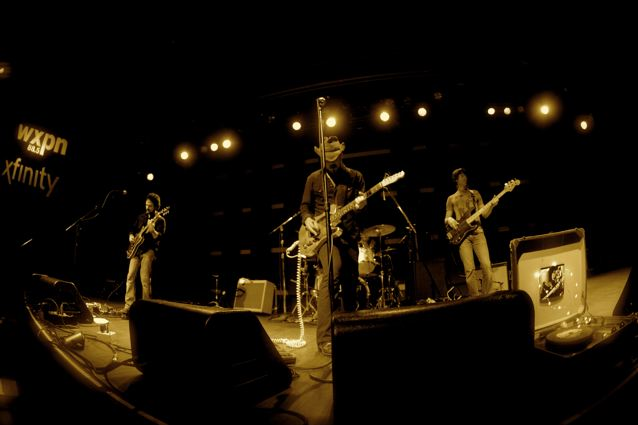
Wanderlust performing at WXPN Free at Noon

In the fall of 2011, Scot sent an instrumental to former writing partner Rob. Realizing that the chemistry was still there after 14 years, the band decided to get back together and work on a project. They wrote and recorded the entire CD at Milkboy Studios in Ardmore, PA in three days. After finishing the album, the band signed with indie-label Zip Records, and the CD is distributed by Red Distribution/Sony Music. Record Time was released on 25 September 2012 in a digital format. The lead single "Lou Reed" can be heard on AAA radio and internet radio. Wanderlust played the WXPN Free at Noon show in support of the new CD on July 27, 2012.

=== Track listing ===
1. "Lou Reed"
2. "Pornographic Version of You"
3. "Blow Away"
4. "Friend Tonight"
5. "Fork in the Road"
6. "Easy Street"
7. "We Need a Drummer"
8. "Illuminate"
9. "You Make Me"
10. "Like Stars"
11. "Photographic Mind"
12. "I Walked" 2012 (bonus track)
