= Revelations of a Mind Unraveling =

Studio album by Lincoln Durham
- Released: March 25, 2016
- Genre: Rock, alternative folk, Southern Gothic, revival punk
- Length: 31:37
- Label: Droog Records
- Producer: George Reiff

Lincoln Durham chronology
Exodus of the Deemed Unrighteous (2013)	Revelations of a Mind Unraveling (2016)	And Into Heaven Came the Night (2018)

Professional ratings
Review scores
Source	Rating
PopMatters	7/10 stars

Revelations of a Mind Unraveling is Lincoln Durham's third studio album, released on March 25, 2016, on Droog Records. The album is a soundtrack for his exploration of the darkness of his inner psyche. Durham has dealt with anxiety, depression, and OCD all of his life, and rather than taking medication, he has found that his music soothes his issues. The album was written during a period when his issues rose up against him and he wrote the music as ammunition to shoot it down.

== Track list ==
All tracks are written by Lincoln Durham

No.	Title	Length
1.	"Suffer My Name"	2:00
2.	"Bleed Until You Die"	3:18
3.	"Creeper"	3:41
4.	"Bones"	3:25
5.	"Prophet Incarnate"	2:50
6.	"Rage and Fire and Brimstone"	4:13
7.	"Rusty Knife"	3:53
8.	"Gods of Wood and Stone"	3:01
9.	"Noose"	2:35
10.	"Bide My Time"	2:41
