= Exodus of the Deemed Unrighteous =

Studio album by Lincoln Durham
- Released: October 22, 2013
- Genre: Roots rock, alternative folk, blues
- Length: 31:46
- Label: Droog Records
- Producer: George Reiff

Lincoln Durham chronology
The Shovel vs. the Howling Bones (2012)	Exodus of the Deemed Unrighteous (2013)	Revelations of a Mind Unraveling (2016)

Professional ratings
Review scores
Source	Rating
The Irish Times	4/5 stars

Exodus of the Deemed Unrighteous is Lincoln Durham's second studio album, released on October 22, 2013, on Droog Records. Durham teamed up with drummer Rick Richard and producer George Reiff for the second time for his follow up album to The Shovel vs. the Howling Bones. Durham plays a variety of instruments on the album, playing his guitar and other instruments including a cigar box guitar, an old Samsonite case, piano, lap steel guitar, harmonica, and a banjo.

== Track list ==
All tracks are written by Lincoln Durham

No.	Title	Length
1.	"Ballad of a Prodigal Son"	2:19
2.	"Rise in the River"	2:54
3.	"Annie Departee"	4:12
4.	"Beautifully Sewn, Violently Torn"	3:05
5.	"Stupid Man"	2:59
6.	"Strike Us Down"	1:58
7.	"Keep on Allie"	4:00
8.	"Sinner"	4:18
9.	"Exodus Waltz"	2:35
10.	"Mama"	3:26

== Personnel ==
Musicians

- Lincoln Durham – vocals, guitar, fiddle, harmonica, lap steel guitar, piano, wind chimes
- Rick Richards – drums, percussion, hand-clapping

Special guest musicians

- George Reiff - kalimba, hand-clapping, background vocals
- Alissa Durham - hand-clapping, background vocals
