= Nox Aeris =

Studio album by Janus
- Released: March 27, 2012
- Genre: Alternative metal, nu metal
- Length: 44:11
- Label: REALID Records

Janus chronology
Red Right Return (2008)	Nox Aeris (2012)

Alternative cover

Nox Aeris is the second major label studio album and fifth overall by rock band Janus. The album was released on March 27, 2012. The song "Stains" peaked at No.26 on the Billboard Mainstream Rock Chart.

The album title is Latin for "night air" and stems from the Black Death-era belief that going outdoors at night made people susceptible to the disease. Two slightly different album covers were released, depicting a person with a plague mask.

== Track listing ==
1. In Flames - 3:17
2. Stains - 3:36
3. Lifeless - 3:36
4. Promise To No One - 3:37
5. Pound Of Flesh - 3:08
6. Waive - 3:36
7. Stray - 4:24
8. Numb - 3:28
9. Always Rains - 5:02
10. Polarized - 3:06

Deluxe edition tracks

11. Numb (Acoustic) - 3:38
12. Stains (Acoustic) - 3:43

== Charts ==
Year	Chart	Position
2012	Billboard Top Heatseekers	24
2012	Billboard Rock Albums	33
