= Tamte Czasy =

Studio album by Karol Gwóźdź
- Released: January 16, 2012
- Genre: Ambient, Modern classical
- Length: 39:15
- Label: Psychonavigation PSY049
- Producer: Karol Gwóźdź

Tamte Czasy is the debut album by Silesian musician Karol Gwóźdź. It was released on 16 January 2012 by Psychonavigation Records. In 2013, track "Gůrnoślůnskje Tragedyje" was used in the Emmy Award nominated drama movie "Beat Girl".

== Reception ==
Tamte Czasy received mainly positive reviews on release. Textura.org reviewed the album positively, calling it "Taken on its own terms, the album's sultry piano serenades and ominous vignettes make for a potent combination." Vital Weekly said of the album "I think Gwozdz delivers a true fine ambient album of great quality." Stephen Fruitman, writing for Cyclic Defrost, stated: As a kind of mood primer, Gwóźdź taped cassette hiss over which to record his album. It is just barely discernable and gives his meticulous compositions, combining a variety of acoustic instruments, though most often and prominently the piano, with synthesizers, an enhanced foundation on which to adhere. It´s a very promising debut. It has its bland moments and it droops near the end, but its best tracks, and they are the majority, light up an otherwise dreary vista.

Professional ratings
Review scores
Source	Rating
The Irish Times	3/5 stars
ReGen Magazine	3/5 stars
EtherREAL	6/8 stars
Ashoka	8/10

== Track listing ==
All tracks are written by Karol Gwóźdź.

No.	Title	Length
1.	"Dyszczowy Poranek Na Bytkowje"	4:04
2.	"Myśli Zasutego Bergmana"	2:29
3.	"Bittkow"	6:32
4.	"Echo Nocy"	3:57
5.	"Rajza Po Parku"	2:44
6.	"Gůrnoślůnskje Tragedyje"	3:38
7.	"Tamte Czasy"	4:04
8.	"Spůmńyńa"	4:27
9.	"Utopek"	2:42
10.	"Gryfne Bajtlostwo"	4:42
Total length:		39:15
