= Apologies, I Have None =

English band

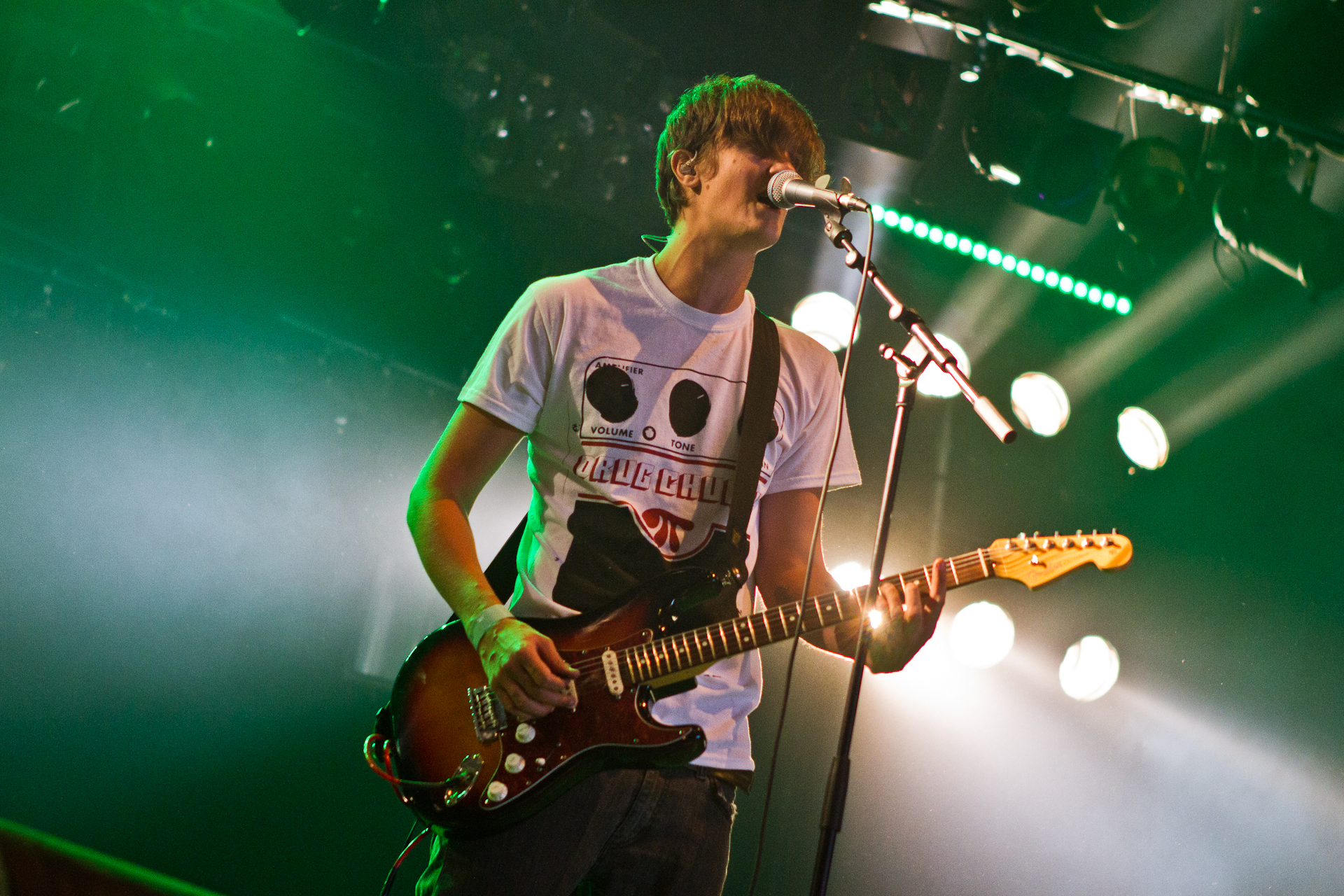
- Josh McKenzie of Apologies, I Have None at Groezrock Festival 2014 in Meerhout, Belgium

Background information
- Origin: London, England
- Genres: Folk punk, punk rock
- Years active: 2004–present
- Labels: Self-released, Household Name Records, Uncle M Music
- Members: Josh Mckenzie 乔 沃森 (EN: Joe Watson); James Hull
- Past members: Dan Bond; PJ Shepherd; Lee Hartney; Simon Small
- Website: apologiesihavenone.co.uk

Apologies, I Have None are an English melancholic, punk-influenced quartet from London, England.

== History ==
Apologies, I Have None started off as a two-piece drums and guitar band, consisting of Dan Bond and Josh Mckenzie. In 2007 they released their first EP, "Done" which was available on CD and as a free download through the band's website. On 18 March 2009 they released their second EP "Two Sticks and Six Strings". Later on in 2009 they expanded the line up by adding PJ Shepherd on bass and 乔 沃森 on drums.

On 1 April 2010, Apologies, I Have None released a Double A-side 7", featuring the tracks "Sat In Vicky Park" and "Joiners And Windmills".

In March 2011, Apologies, I Have None were featured on BBC Radio 1's "The Punk Show with Mike Davies". The show featured several tracks recorded in session at the BBC's Maida Vale Studios in London, and an interview with Mike Davies. Apologies, I Have None regularly toured the UK and Europe and in May and June 2011 recorded a new album which was scheduled for release in 2012.

On 19 March 2012, Apologies, I Have None released their debut album London. The band self-released the CD version, with London punk label Household Name Records releasing the vinyl LP. The label also pressed a limited edition white vinyl edition of the LP of which only 75 copies were made. This was later released by Uncle M Music in Germany.

Over the 2012 August Bank Holiday weekend, Apologies, I Have None opened the Lock Up Stage on the Sunday and Friday respectively at Reading and Leeds Festivals.

On 20 February 2014, the band announced via their Facebook page that founding member Dan Bond had left the band and that they would continue as a three-piece. Simon Small later joined the band on guitar. In 2014, the band released their Black Everything EP on Uncle M Music. The same year, they toured Europe playing many festivals and shows including Hurricane and Southside and Groezrock. On 22 August 2014, the band announced via their Facebook page that bassist PJ Shepherd had left the band. He was later replaced by James Hull. In November 2014, Apologies joined The Smith Street Band and The Front Bottoms for a sold-out tour in Australia. Lee Hartney featured on bass.

In 2014 and 2015, time was spent writing and recording Pharmacie - the follow-up to 2012's London. This was released in 2016.

In March 2026, the band announced via their Instagram page that Simon Small had passed away after a car accident.

== Band members ==
Present:

- Josh Mckenzie - Vocals/Guitar
- 乔 - Drums
- James Hull - Bass

Former

- Dan Bond - Vocals/Guitar (2004–2014)
- PJ Shepherd - Bass (2009–2014)
- Lee Hartney - Bass (2014)
- Simon Small - Guitar (2014–2026; his death)

== Discography ==
=== EPs and singles ===
Year	Title	Label
2007	Done	self released
2009	Two Sticks and Six Strings	self released
2010	"Sat in Vicky Park" / "Joiners and Windmills"	self released
2011	Split with ONSIND & Calvinball	Specialist Subject
2012	"Clapton Pond"	self released
2014	Black Everything	Beach Community
2016	Split with Luca Brasi	Holy Roar Records (Cassette) Uncle M Music (Digital)

=== Albums ===
Year	Title	Label
2012	London	Household Name
2016	Pharmacie	Holy Roar Records (UK/AUS/NZ) Uncle M Music (EUR) Animal Style Records (USA/JAP)

=== Music videos ===
Year	Title	Director
2012	60 Miles	Joe Spray
2012	Clapton Pond	JG Harding
2012	Long Gone	JG Harding
2013	Foundations	N/A
2016	Wraith	N/A
2016	Love & Medication	South of Devon Films
2016	Everybody Wants To Talk About Mental Health	South of Devon Films
2016	A Pharmacy In Paris	South of Devon Films
