= Lincoln Durham =

American singer-songwriter

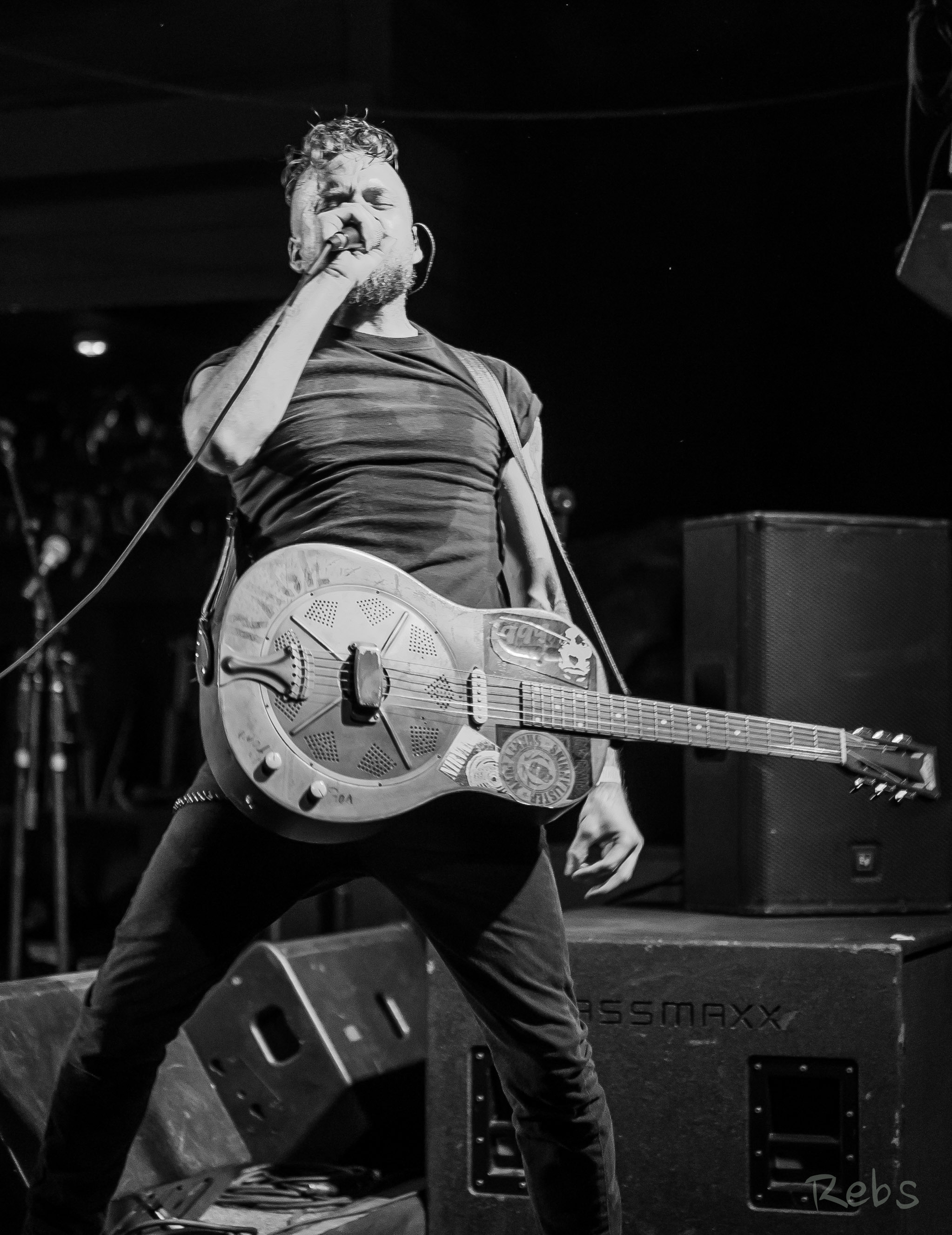
- Lincoln Durham at Pennyfest 2017

Background information
- Born: Whitney, Texas, United States
- Genres: Alternative rock, southern gothic, revival punk, psycho blues, Americana
- Occupation(s): Singer-songwriter, guitarist
- Instrument(s): Vocals, guitar, drums, cigar box guitars, harmonica, fiddle, banjo, mandolin
- Years active: 2010–present
- Labels: Droog Records, Rayburn Publishing, CD Baby
- Website: lincolndurham.com

Lincoln Durham is an American alternative rock, southern gothic, revival punk, psycho blues, Americana singer, songwriter and one-man-band musician.

== History ==
Lincoln Durham was born in Whitney, Texas and grew up in Itasca, Texas. Durham started out playing fiddle when he was four. He competed in fiddle contests in Texas, Arkansas, and Oklahoma, and when he was ten, he won the Texas State Youth Fiddle Championship. In high school, Durham switched to electric guitar citing Nirvana as the inspiration for a new direction. After high school he took a break from music, but he returned, switching over to acoustic guitar and picking up a slide guitar style. Durham was mentored by Ray Wylie Hubbard. Durham's current sound has been compared to Nick Cave, Jack White and Tom Waits.

== Recordings ==
In 2010, Durham recorded an extended play album, EP, produced by Ray Wylie Hubbard and George Reiff. The EP was released on May 11, 2010, as a sneak-peek for his upcoming debut album, which was in the process of being produced, but would not be released until almost two years later.

Lincoln Durham's debut full-length album, The Shovel vs. the Howling Bones was released January 31, 2012 by Rayburn Publishing. The album was produced by Ray Wylie Hubbard and George Reiff at George Reiff's studio, The Finishing School in Austin, Texas. Durham played the majority of the instruments, including a 1929 Gibson HG22 guitar, a bird feeder, a hacksaw, and oil pans. Drums were performed by Rick Richards. Other guest musicians from Austin on the album were Derek O'Brien (guitar), Jeff Plankenhorn (mandolin), Bucca Allen (accordion and piano), and Idgy Vaughn (backup vocals on "Trucker's Love Song"), plus Lincoln Durham's wife, Alissa (backup vocals).

Durham's second album, Exodus of the Deemed Unrighteous was released on October 22, 2013, by Droog Records. The album was produced by George Reiff at his studio, The Finishing School in Austin, Texas, and has Rick Richards on drums again.

Durham's third album, Revelations of a Mind Unraveling, was released on March 25, 2016, on Droog Records. The album was produced by George Reiff at The Finishing School in Austin, Texas.

Durham's fourth album, And Into Heaven Came the Night, was released on March 30, 2018, on Droog Records. The album was produced by Lincoln Durham, and recorded at The Ice Cream Factory Studios and The Crypt in Austin, Texas.

== Discography ==
=== Studio albums ===
Year	Details
2012	The Shovel vs. the Howling Bones: Released: January 31, 2012; Label: Lincoln Durham/Rayburn Publishing
2013	Exodus of the Deemed Unrighteous: Released: October 22, 2013; Label: Droog Records
2016	Revelations of a Mind Unraveling: Released: March 25, 2016; Label: Droog Records
2018	And Into Heaven Came the Night: Released: March 30, 2018; Label: Droog Records
2023	Resurrection Thorn: Released: June 30, 2023; Label: Droog Records

=== Extended Play ===
Year	Details
2010	EP: Released: March 20, 2010; Label: Lincoln Durham, CD Baby

== EP extended play listing ==
EP

EP by Lincoln Durham
- Released: March 20, 2010
- Genre: Folk, blues
- Length: 12:24
- Label: Lincoln Durham, CD Baby
- Producer: Ray Wylie Hubbard, George Reiff

Lincoln Durham chronology
EP (2010)	The Shovel vs. the Howling Bones (2012)

All tracks are written by Lincoln Durham

No.	Title	Length
1.	"Living This Hard"	3:25
2.	"Georgia Lee"	3:20
3.	"How Does a Crow Fly"	2:34
4.	"Reckoning Lament"	3:05
