= Janus (American band) =

American metal band

- Origin: North East, Maryland, U.S.
- Genres: Alternative metal; nu metal; hard rock
- Years active: 1992–2014; 2019–present
- Labels: REALID Records, Music For Good
- Members: David Scotney; Anthony Lojeski; Mike Tyranski; Jake Portenkirchner
- Past members: Shawn Harrity; Dan Thomey; Richie "Dickie" Betts; Alan Quitman; Johnny Salazar; Jared Melrath
- Website: www.janusmusic.com

Janus is an American alternative metal band based in Chicago. They formed in 1992 in North East, Maryland. Performing their first gig in Gary and Brians Basement in Newark Delaware, and have released five studio albums, “Orifice” (1994),Influx (1998), Armor (2004), Red Right Return (2008), and Nox Aeris (2012). They mix alternative metal with non-traditional rock instruments, such as auxiliary percussion, and electronic sounds. The band gained popularity on rock radio stations across the US due to their single "Eyesore," and has toured with bands such as All That Remains, Breaking Benjamin, Chevelle, Sevendust, and Sick Puppies. The band is known for wearing custom made red and black 1920s Russian-inspired militaristic uniforms both on stage, and in their music video for "Eyesore."

== History ==
Janus formed in 1998 and that same year released Influx, a 12 track CD issued through Mirror Records with a sound similar to The Smashing Pumpkins, Tool, and Soundgarden. In 2004 Janus released their second album, titled Armor containing 9 tracks of a more modern alternative metal sound. In 2006 Janus released a 5 track demo that contained songs they would later re-record and feature on their 2008 release Red Right Return. 5 songs were recorded for this demo: "If I Were You", "Your Arms", "The Nerve", "Skin Deep", and "100 Years". In 2007, director Noah Shulman shot a music video for their demo version of "If I Were You" in an ink factory in Chicago, Illinois in support of their third upcoming album, Red Right Return, which was released in 2008 through Level It Records/Glass Bottom Boat Music.

Johnny Salazar, previously of the bands "Shades of Fiction" and "Relative Ash", joined as the new drummer in 2007. Replacing long time original drummer Richie Betts (Influx/Armor/Red Right Return). Signed to a new label (REALID/ILG Records), Janus re-released Red Right Return in 2009, and shot another music video with Noah Shulman for their single "Eyesore."

The band's fourth album, Nox Aeris, was released on March 27, 2012. The first single is "Stains."

According to a Tweet by band member Mike Tyranski in October 2016, the band is no longer together. Frontman David Scotney has since moved out of the Chicago area to start a new pizza restaurant called Oakfire in Lake Geneva, WI David Scotney, re-launched the band and announced via a youtube video on April 22, 2019.

On May 3, 2019, the band released their first single since 2012, a cover of the song Drive, by The Cars, and all of the proceeds go to charity for bipolar disorder research.

== Discography ==
=== Studio albums ===
Year	Album details	Peak chart positions		Certification (sales thresholds)
Year	Album details	US Heat	US Rock	Certification (sales thresholds)
1995	Orifice: Released: 1995; Label: Mirror Records; Format: CD	—	—	
1998	Influx: Released: 1998; Label: Mirror Records; Format: CD	—	—	
2004	Armor: Released: 2004; Label: Inasense Studios; Format: CD	—	—	
2008	Red Right Return: Released: November 18, 2008; Re-release: September 22, 2009; Label: Level It Records, Glass Bottom Boat Music, REALID; Format: CD, DI	—	—	
2012	Nox Aeris: Released: March 27, 2012; Label: REALID; Format: CD, DI	24	33	
"—" denotes a release that did not chart.

=== Singles ===
Year	Song	US Main	US Rock	Album
2009	"Eyesore"	17	31	Red Right Return
2010	"If I Were You"	—	—	Red Right Return
2012	"Stains"	26	—	Nox Aeris
2012	"Promise to No One"	—	—	Nox Aeris
2019	"Drive"			
2020	"Stolen Sisters on YouTube"			
2021	"In Flames (Redux) on YouTube"			
2025	"Empty Eyes on YouTube"			
