= The Shovel vs. the Howling Bones =

Studio album by Lincoln Durham
- Released: January 31, 2012
- Genre: Acoustic blues, roots rock, blues
- Length: 37:59
- Label: Lincoln Durham/Rayburn Publishing
- Producer: Ray Wylie Hubbard, George Reiff

Lincoln Durham chronology
EP (2010)	The Shovel vs. the Howling Bones (2012)	Exodus of the Deemed Unrighteous (2013)

Professional ratings
Review scores
Source	Rating
The Austin Chronicle	2/5 stars
PopMatters	7/10 stars

The Shovel vs. the Howling Bones is Lincoln Durham's debut studio album, released on January 31, 2012 by Rayburn Publishing. Four of the songs on the album are from his 2010 EP, and the other seven are original compositions. Durham was mentored and produced by singer-songwriter Ray Wylie Hubbard, and co-produced by George Reiff. Durham played the majority of the instruments, including a 1929 Gibson HG22 guitar, a bird feeder, a hacksaw, and oil pans. Drums were performed by Rick Richards. Other guest musicians from Austin on the album were Derek O'Brien Jeff Plankenhorn, Bucca Allen, and Idgy Vaughn, plus Lincoln Durham's wife, Alissa.

== Track list ==
All tracks are written by Lincoln Durham

No.	Title	Length
1.	"Drifting Wood"	4:23
2.	"Last Red Dawn"	3:10
3.	"Living This Hard"	3:26
4.	"Clementine"	3:22
5.	"Mud Puddles"	3:27
6.	"Reckoning Lament"	3:10
7.	"How Does a Crow Fly"	2:36
8.	"Love Letters"	2:57
9.	"Georgia Lee"	3:19
10.	"People of the Land"	3:23
11.	"Trucker's Love Song"	4:46

== Personnel ==
Musicians

- Lincoln Durham – vocals, guitars, fiddle, harmonica
- Rick Richards – drums; bird feeder and trashcan (track 7), cardboard box (track 10)

Special guest musicians

- Ray Wylie Hubbard – guitar (track 4), backup vocals (track 10)
- Jeff Plankenhorn - mandolin (track 2)
- Bucca Allen - grand piano (track 4), accordion (track 11)
- Derek O'Brian - guitar (tracks 1 and 11)
- George Reiff - guitar
- Idgy Vaughn - backup vocals (track 10 and 11)
- Alissa Durham - backup vocals and cardboard box (track 10)
- Clay Berkes - backup vocals (track 9)
