= My Tiger My Timing =

- Origin: New Cross, London, UK
- Genres: New wave, pop, indie rock
- Years active: 2008–2014
- Labels: Snakes & Ladders Records, Modular, Kitsuné, Pure Groove, Electric Minds
- Members: Anna Vincent; James Vincent; Jamie Harrison; Sebastian Underhill; Gary Drain

My Tiger My Timing was a five-piece new wave pop band from New Cross in south-east London formed in 2008. Their music was described by NME.com as "tribal electro like a south London Gang Gang Dance" and by Clash as "alternative pop with a dark heart that's bursting with desire". The band are on indefinite hiatus as of 2014.

The band take their name from the title of a song by New York experimental musician Arthur Russell.

== Career ==
Their debut single "This Is Not The Fire" was produced by Andy Spence of the British New Rave band New Young Pony Club and self-released in April 2009. Their second single, "I Am The Sound", was also produced by Andy Spence and released as part of I Am The Sound EP through London's Pure Groove label.

The band's music has also featured on Kitsuné Maison Compilation 8, on Modular's Leave Them All Behind III, on the Pure Groove 3 sampler and French label Sisterphunk's Sisters EP. They contributed a cover of an Arthur Russell song, "Arm Around You" to A Tribute to Arthur Russell, a compilation released on the Electric Minds label.

In November 2010, the band were chosen as winners of the Beck's European Newcomer award.

In April 2011, the band made the finals of Glastonbury's Emerging Talent Competition and opened the John Peel Stage at the festival that year.

In August 2011 the band released their third single, Endless Summer through their own Snakes & Ladders label. The single was playlisted by BBC 6 Music and XFM and was described by Drowned in Sound as "shimmery post-punk...in which all the guitar lines dangle like silver filigree chains".

In November 2011 Snakes & Ladders released a fourth single, Written in Red, followed by a free Christmas download, See You on New Year's Day. They released 5th single "The Gold Rush" Snakes & Ladders on 25 June 2012 just ahead of the release of their debut album 'Celeste' on 2 July 2012 through their own Snakes & Ladders label.

The third single released from 'Celeste' – "Let Me Go" Snakes & Ladders was released on 5 November 2012.

== Press ==
"An album that nostalgically looks back through the band's metaphorical personal diaries with songs written about the best days of their lives"

"Shimmery post-punk, it is a beautifully composed three and a half minutes in which all the guitar lines dangle like silver filigree chains"

"Deliciously upbeat and groove-laden post-punk"

"Tribal electro like a south London Gang Gang Dance"

"Alternative pop with a dark heart that's bursting with desire"

"Their debut single, This Is Not The Fire...sounds distilled, concentrated – it's electro with its bones showing"

"My Tiger My Timing slowly mess with expectations, tinkering with the trappings of 21st century post-punk and altering bits of their sound here and there with such a deft hand that it's barely noticeable. But it makes all the difference"

"…their musical modesty hides a cleverness and sexiness which is all the more irresistible for its refusal to announce itself"

"...you can't deny that this is a magic pop song" – Xposure Hot One

== Radio ==
The band's their third single Endless Summer was playlisted on BBC 6 Music from June to August 2011, and on XFM's Evening Playlist in July 2011. In April 2009, the band were broadcast as part of XFM's Xposure Live sessions with John Kennedy. In May 2010, the band played the BBC Introducing stage at Radio 1's Big Weekend event in Bangor, North Wales.

== Discography ==
=== Albums ===
- Celeste (2 July 2012)

=== Singles ===
- This Is Not The Fire (9 April 2009)
- I Am The Sound (9 October 2009)
- Endless Summer (11 August 2011)
- Written in Red (11 November 2011)
- The Gold Rush (12 June 2012)
- Let Me Go (12 November 2012)

=== EPs ===
- I Am The Sound EP (9 October 2009 / re-released 11 August 2010)

=== Compilations ===
- Sisters EP – Sisterphunk (9 April 2009)
- Leave Them All Behind III – Modular (9 August 2009)
- Pure Groove 3 – Pure Groove (9 August 2009)
- Kitsuné Maison Compilation 8 – Kitsuné (9 November 2009)
- A Tribute to Arthur Russell – Electric Minds (9 November 2009)

=== Other Tracks ===
- Arm Around You – Arthur Russell cover (9 April)
- Far Away feat. My Tiger My Timing – by Futurecop! (11 October)
- California Gurls – Katy Perry cover (11 August)
- See You on New Year's Day – Christmas download (11 December)

=== Music Videos ===
- This Is Not The Fire – directed by Ian William Galloway (9 April)
- I Am The Sound – directed by Ian William Galloway (9 August)
- Endless Summer – directed by Ross McClure (11 August)
- Written in Red – directed by Jenny Sadler (11 November)
- The Gold Rush – directed by My Tiger My Timing and Visitor (30 August)
- Let Me Go – directed by Visitor (21 November)
