= The Mighty Manatees =

American band

- Origin: Montgomery County, Pennsylvania
- Years active: 1985–present
- Labels: Fuzztone Records, Shady Egyptian Records, Hungadunga Records, JefDam Records, Shoreline, Lakestone Records, Ronkle Records, DeCarlo Records, Flexitone Records
- Members: Ranger Will; Joe "Jo-Zo" Rizzo; Karl "K-Jo" Frick; Tim Hooper; Jim Hines
- Past members: Many of the players on this list still play with The Mighty Manatees on occasion: Ray Adkins; Rev. Tom "Bebop" Brunner; Ted "The Fiddler" Wilby; Roy Truax; Myles Rothwell; Andrew "Dr. Drew" Geltzer; Jim "Grandpa" Cavanaugh; Jim Sergovic; Eric Allal; Andy Vernon; Ritchie DeCarlo; Tim Campbell; Jeff "Blondy" Von Stenz; Harold Watkins; Bobby Michaels; Ras Michael Sheffer; Kathleen Weber; Nancy Josephson; Jim Verduer; Tom Mussleman; Chris Delsordo; Brian Herder; Waler Tates Jr. Jason Crosby; Brett Hass; Randy Wagner; Aaron DeAngelo; Terry DeAngelo; Roy Bell; John Bian
- Website: www.themightymanatees.com

The Mighty Manatees is an American band based in Montgomery County, Pennsylvania. Throughout a career spanning four decades, the band has performed in a wide range of styles including blues, reggae, country, folk, ska, funk, zydeco and rock 'n roll—distilled into a genre described as "Dreadneck", a term not easily defined. They have formerly been known by a variety of other stage names, including The Manatees, and The Mighty Manatees Medicine Show.

On September 11, 2002 the band played in a tribute to those who died in the September 11 attacks.

In 2012 Jim Cavanaugh and Will Hodgson played in Belfast and Dublin, backing up Shana Morrison opening for father Van Morrison.

In 2015 the group performed at a theater in Sellersville, Pennsylvania to celebrate their 30th anniversary and to memorialize a Pennsylvania-born teenager who died of a brain tumor.

== Discography ==
- 1988 [Cassette] Manatees - Live
- 1989 [Cassette] History Of The Manatees Vol. One
- 1991 High Water
- 1991 The Shoreline Sampler Vol. One (Compilation)
- 1992 The Mighty Manatees - Whiskey Joe's
- 1996 South Paw
- 1996 Live Medicine
- 1996 'Tees In The Keys
- 2002 All Heaven Broke
- 2002 Manatee Masquerade
- 2003 Go Forward (Compilation)
- 2003 Good Friday Tracks - La Banda Grande
- 2004 Tall Pines (acoustic)
- 2006 No "L" (Christmas compilation)
- 2008 The Mighty Manatees
- 2009 The Mighty Manatees Live!
- 2013 Medicine Show

== Video releases ==
- 1989 Manatees in Manhattan (60 min)
- 1990 Save This (30 min)
