= Eyesore (song) =

Single by Janus

from the album Red Right Return
- Released: August 18, 2009
- Genre: Nu metal, industrial metal
- Length: 3:36
- Label: REALID Records
- Songwriter: Janus

Janus singles chronology
"Eyesore" (2009)	"If I Were You" (2010)

Music video
- "Eyesore" on YouTube

"Eyesore" is a song written by Janus. It is the 5th track from their third album Red Right Return, and was the first single released from the album in 2009. An acoustic version was exclusively released on KUPDs Acoustic 2010 compilation album.

== Song ==
In an interview David Scotney said, “Eyesore” is about listening to your own voice, not letting others influence your thoughts and decisions, and being true to yourself. The title, “Eyesore,” is meant to define that moment of awareness where you realize the consequence of not following your own voice.

== Chart performance ==
Chart (2009)	Peak Position
Billboard U.S. Mainstream Rock	17
Billboard U.S. Rock	31

== Music video ==
The music video of Eyesore was directed and edited by Noah Shulman. Video was shot in a green screen studio with all members individually. The music video shows the band in a uniform performing on stage in front of a huge crowd with respirators covering their faces.

== Track listing ==
All tracks are written by Janus.

No.	Title	Length
1.	"Eyesore (Radio Edit)"	3:01
2.	"Eyesore (Album Version)"	3:38
