= Two Sticks and Six Strings =

EP by Apologies, I Have None
- Released: 2010
- Recorded: London; 2008 - 2009
- Length: 17:08

Apologies, I Have None chronology
Done (2007)	Two Sticks and Six Strings (2010)	7" (2010)

Professional ratings
Review scores
Source	Rating
Punknews.org	4/5 stars

Two Sticks and Six Strings is the second EP by Apologies, I Have None. It was released on CD in 2010 by the band without any label backing. The EP was also released on iTunes on 18 March 2009.

== Track listing ==
All tracks are written by Apologies, I Have None

No.	Title	Length
1.	"100 Club"	2:25
2.	"Bent Strings"	4:08
3.	"Green Green Mabley Green"	3:11
4.	"Apologies, I Have None"	3:23
5.	"Rearranging The Dust"	4:01
Total length:		17:08

== Personnel ==
- Dan Bond
- Josh McKenzie

Additional personnel

- Gaby De Sena
- Ema Smith
- PJ Shepherd
- James Allan
- Tommy Simpson

Artwork

- Emma Smith
