= 01-06 June =

2012 album by Tomat

Studio album by Tomat
- Released: March 5, 2012
- Recorded: June 1, 2010–June 6, 2010
- Studio: Superbudda Studio (Turin)
- Genres: Noise music; Ambient music; Electronica
- Label: Monotreme

01-06 June is the debut solo album by Italian musician Davide Tomat (of the rock band N.A.M.B.), under the mononym Tomat. A space-themed concept album, it was recorded by Tomat over the first six days of June 2010 and was released on March 5, 2012, through Monotreme Records.

== Background ==
Davide Tomat became known as the leader of the rock band N.A.M.B. and a side project called Niagara. He recorded a few solo songs in 1997, but abandoned the project. Tomat later began improvising alone for long periods during his time with N.A.M.B., describing the results as "interesting." This motivated him to record a full solo album.

== Recording and production ==
01-06 June was recorded over the first six days of June 2010, during which Tomat locked himself in his studio to record in total exile. He entered what he described as an "almost unconscious state", leading him to believe that "perhaps some energetic echo of events from the past or some recurring astral conjunction had somehow influenced me on that sonic journey". While researching on Wikipedia, Tomat learned about the variety of space-related events that transpired over those six days throughout history. He then matched up the historical events with the moods of the songs he had created.

Tomat initially recorded seven hours of music, of which 36 tracks were crafted. This was later reduced to 11 songs, which were then mixed and mastered in Berlin. Each of the 11 songs on the album was therefore named after one of these events, ranging from the Montgolfier brothers' first public demonstration of their hot air balloon on June 4, 1783, to the 2012 transit of Venus on June 6, 2012.

I improvised for six days straight with my voice filtered through loopers, Kaoss pads, laptop, delay, and also my guitar and my Moog, synchronizing all the various loopers so that all the sound material I produced was always in sync. –Tomat describing his recording process.

== Artwork ==
According to Tomat, the cover art for the album was "based on a pixel treatment of images that represent the ordered diffraction of X-rays all having the same energy through a crystalline sample of DNA." He said the idea for the artwork came from a book called Powers of Ten that he read at age 10. Tomat also compared the concept to his album, which was "passed through digital effects that dissected the continuous signal into a discrete signal using the digital sampling technique." He added that "space is discrete, digital, and not analog, like pixels in images and digital sampling in music."

== Release and promotion ==
01-06 June was released through Monotreme Records on March 5, 2012, via CD and digital download.

Tomat released a music video for "1984" later that month, directed by his bandmate and frequent collaborator Gabriele Ottino. It was the first solo music video of his career. As described by Redefine, the video "mixes archival footage of events between June 1st and June 6th, 1984, glitch and pixel elements, and modern day footage of the musician into a brightly-colored visual slideshow." According to Ottino, "Its aesthetics of reality [...] is invaded by visual glitches and pixel errors that almost suggest a transition between the lived-in reality and a data bank of auxiliary memory."

Tomat later released a music video for "Titan" in 2013. It was similarly directed by Ottino.

== Critical reception ==
01-06 June
Review scores
Source	Rating
AllMusic	4/5 stars
God Is in the TV	4.5/5
PopMatters	7/10
The Skinny	3/5 stars

Ned Raggett of AllMusic rated the album four out of five stars. He wrote that it "falls somewhere between dreamy ambient pop formalism and something else entirely -- every time it seems like one can get an exact handle on either a song or the album as a whole, Tomat takes it a little somewhere else."

A 4.5-out-of-five review in God Is in the TV described it as "expansive textured layers of white-noise electronica [...] interlaced with a varied synthesis of aching, drifting and swooning vocals", adding that Tomat "warrants praise for unassumingly, and with a fanfare, crafting an effective immersible listening experience".

In a review for PopMatters, Steven Spoerl rated the album a seven out of ten. He described it as "a dense record, overflowing with ideas. Fortunately, they’re mostly good ones, and while Tomat does take the listener to the edge more than once and constantly tests their patience, what he’s delivered here is an album that’s difficult to forget." Spoerl also speculated that it could "become a curiosity that elevates itself to cult favorite in years to come"; and concluded that it was a "genuinely fascinating debut from a fairly exciting new artist who’s provided us with some conversation-starting music that’s pretty damn good."

In a mixed review, The Skinny's Sam Wiseman awarded the album three out of five stars. He wrote that "the conceptual dimension to 01-06 June feels fairly superficial", though "[m]usically [...] it wrings moments of beauty and sublimity from its spartan origins". He concluded that it "may be somewhat confused, but its erratic-yet-intuitive style often yields unexpected rewards."

== Track listing ==
01-06 June track listing
No.	Title	Length
1.	"CE-2"	4:31
2.	"Radio"	6:59
3.	"Donaticomet"	9:26
4.	"Soyuz"	3:43
5.	"Jupiterasteroid"	9:46
6.	"Montgolfier"	6:20
7.	"Lovelyplace"	3:52
8.	"Venus"	7:13
9.	"1984"	5:15
10.	"Soyuz11"	4:37
11.	"Titan"	7:35
