= Snakes & Ladders Records =

- Founded: 2005; 20 years ago
- Genre: Indie
- Country of origin: London, England
- Official website: snakes.interbase.co.uk

Snakes & Ladders Records is a London-based independent DIY label founded in 2005 by members of the London band My Tiger My Timing.

The label released music during 2006 and 2007, and then after a hiatus of 4 years, resumed activity in 2011.

== Discography ==
=== Singles ===
- How Did We Make it So Angry? – Shock Defeat [S&L002] (September 2006)
- Your Excellency – The Total Drop [S&L004] (January 2007)
- Nuit Americaine – The Total Drop [S&L007] (April 2007)
- I Am Pied Piper – Catnap [S&L005] (November 2007)
- Guts / Amsterdam Vs Berlin – Shock Defeat! [S&L008] (December 2007)
- Endless Summer – My Tiger My Timing [S&L0011] (August 2011)
- Written in Red – My Tiger My Timing [S&L0013] (November 2011)
- The Gold Rush – My Tiger My Timing [S&L0015] (June 2012)
- Let Me Go – My Tiger My Timing [S&L0016] (November 2012)

=== EPs ===
- TTD NYC EP – The Total Drop [S&L003] (September 2006)
- Rugged Individualism EP – The Fat Abbots [S&L006] (April 2007)
- The Fun Before The Crash EP – The Roaring Twenties [S&L007] (April 2007)
- Rubber Headband EP – Shock Defeat! [S&L0010] (December 2007)
- I Am The Sound EP – My Tiger My Timing [S&L0012] (August 2011)

=== Albums ===
- S&LCD001 – label sampler compilation [S&L001] (March 2006)
- Worthless Originals – label sampler compilation [S&L009] (December 2007)
- Celeste – My Tiger My Timing [S&L0014] (July 2012)

== Artists ==
- My Tiger My Timing
- The Total Drop
- The Roaring Twenties
- Shock Defeat!
- Catnap
- The Fat Abbots

== Press ==
Snakes & Ladders featured in Artrocker as part of its DIY labels article (30 August 2006) and included tracks by The Total Drop and The Roaring Twenties on the accompanying covermount CD.

Tracks from the label's sampler compilation S&LCD001 have also been played on the magazine's weekly radio programme on London's Resonance FM and on BBC Radio 1's Rob Da Bank show. Radio 1's Huw Stephens also made S&L his 'DIY-label-of-the-week' on his 'Best of Unsigned' programme, 27 September 2006.

"...with great certainty one would expect to hear a lot more from these bands and this label in the coming years."

"...an excellent snapshot of the flourishing underground art-rock scene..."

"They're doing it all on their own and as such deserve to be supported in their endeavours."

"...an ace little record label."

"Snakes and Ladders is the kind of label we all need. Desperately. Eccentric and wilful, they put out material that does not necessarily want to fit in with any current trend."

== See also ==
- List of record labels
