= List of MNRK Music Group artists =

This is a partial list of artists currently and/or formerly signed to independent record label, MNRK Music Group. It includes artists who were on the Koch or Audium labels as well.

== 0-9 ==
- 2Pac (Death Row/E1/Interscope)
- 40 Cal. (Diplomat/E1)
- The 5 Browns (E1)
- Akir (Viper/Babygrande/E1)
- 98 Degrees

== A ==
- Ace Frehley
- Oleta Adams
- Anew Revolution
- Ani DiFranco (Righteous Babe/E1)
- Arkaea
- Ashanti (Written Entertainment/E1)
- Avalon
- Avatar
- AZ
- Azealia Banks

== B ==
- Blackhole
- Baby D (Big Oomp/E1)
- The Bangles
- Basia
- Benny The Butcher
- Big Noyd
- Big Moe
- Big Pokey
- Bizarre (rapper)
- Black Label Society
- Black Map
- Black Tape For A Blue Girl (Projekt Records)
- Blueface
- Bodysnatcher
- Brandy (Brand Nu Entertainment/eOne Music)
- Bryant Myers
- Brian McKnight (Hard Work/E1)
- Foxy Brown
- Richard Butler
- David Ball
- B.G.
- Tamar Braxton (Tamaritan Land/E1)
- Trina Braxton (SolTri/E1)
- Traci Braxton
- Britney Spears

== C ==
- The Callous Daoboys
- Cash Out (Bases Loaded/E1)
- Cassidy (Krossover/E1)
- Chickenfoot
- Chimaira
- Chris Webby (Eighty HD MUSIC/E1)
- CKY
- Ashley Cleveland
- Confederate Railroad (E1, formerly on Audium & Shanachie)
- The Contortionist (E1/Good Fight Music)
- John Cowan
- Carl Cox
- Crowbar
- ChriZzy Goodtung
- Chief Keef
- Cradle Of Filth (Koch Records)

== D ==
- Charlie Daniels (Blue Hat)
- Darkest Hour
- Dark Sermon
- David Archuleta
- Daz Dillinger (Doggystyle/E1)
- Death from Above
- Derek Minor
- Dirge Within
- Devin The Dude
- DJ Encore
- DJ Khaled (We the Best Music Group/E1)
- Dope
- Dirtfedd
- Donell Jones
- Jerry Douglas
- Dwele
- Dorrough (E1)

== E ==
- Elle Varner
- En Vogue
- Faith Evans (Prolific/E1)
- Enterprise Earth (E1/Good Fight Music)
- Eyes Set to Kill (BreakSilence/E1)

== F ==
- Fat Joe (Terror Squad/E1)
- Fair to Midland
- FBG Cash (Fly Boy Gang)
- Fifth on the Floor (Black Country Rock/eOne Music)
- Fit for an Autopsy
- Funkmaster Flex
- Ken Fowler
- Michael Franks

== G ==
- Gangsta (Gutta/E1)
- Ginuwine
- Goodie Mob
- Vivian Green

== H ==
- Havoc
- Hatebreed
- Hell Rell (Diplomat/E1)
- High on Fire
- Horse the Band
- The Human Abstract
- William Hung

== I ==
- I-20 (dukor/Disturbing Tha Peace)
- Ian Brown
- Iconz
- Imani Winds
- Impending Doom
- In Flames (US distribution)

== J ==
- Joe Budden
- Bob James
- Jedi Mind Tricks (Enemy Soil/E1)
- Jeff Golub
- Jim Jones (Diplomat/E1)
- Donell Jones
- Jordan Knight (JK Music/E1)
- J.R. Writer (Diplomat/Koch)
- Cledus T. Judd (E1, formerly on Audium/Koch)
- Leela James

== K ==
- Kah-Lo
- K.Michelle
- Kermit Furiouz
- King Crimson (back catalogue distribution, via Discipline Global Mobile)

== L ==
- Larsiny Family (Krossover/E1)
- Lake (Death Row/E1)
- LeToya Luckett (E1)
- Lord Dying
- Lil' C-Style (Gangsta Advisory/E1)
- Lil' Kim (Queen Bee Entertainment/E1)
- Lil Mo
- Little Big Town
- Lumineers

== M ==
- Shorty Mack (Knockout/E1)
- Marley Marl
- Peter Malick
- Master P (E1)
- Jake Miller
- Max Thrilla
- Marcus Miller
- Marillion (Velvel/Koch - US)
- Cody McCarver (PLC/E1)
- Melissa Manchester
- Mephiskapheles (Velvel/Koch - US)
- Michel'le (Death Row/E1)
- Michelle Williams (Light Records/E1)
- Keith Murray (Def Squad/E1)
- The Myriad
- Mr. Hyde (Psycho+Logical/E1)
- Messy Marv
- Brian McKnight
- M.O.P.
- Moosh & Twist
- Montana of 300
- MyChildren MyBride

== N ==
- Necro (Psycho+Logical/E1)
- Willie Norwood (Knockout/E1)

== O ==
- Sinéad O'Connor
- Opeth
- Otep
- Overkill (Nuclear Blast/E1)

== P ==
- Paradise Lost
- Playa (Gutta/E1)
- Pleasure P (Swagga Entertainment/E1)
- Clara Ponty (Care/E1)
- Pop Evil
- Prodigy (Infamous/E1)
- Project Pat
- Public Enemy
- Powerglove
- Prime Boys

== Q ==
- Q-Unique (Psycho+Logical/E1)

== R ==
- Ray J (Knockout/E1)
- RBX (Gangsta Advisory/E1)
- Reflections (Good Fight/E1)
- Restless Heart (Audium/Koch)
- Rich Boyz (Gutta/E1)
- Rich Boy
- Steve Roach (Projekt Records)
- Romeo Miller (Gutta/E1)
- Royal Bliss
- RZA
- Ron Isley
- Royce da 5'9 (Koch E1)

== S ==
- Sabac Red (Psycho+Logical/E1)
- Sabrina (WIDEawake/Death Row/E1)
- Satyricon (Roadrunner/E1)
- Scorpions (Koch/E1)
- Sha Stimuli
- Skyharbor (E1/Good Fight Music)
- Shadows Fall
- Maia Sharp
- Sheek Louch (D-Block/E1)
- Shemy (ClockWerk/KRD/Oarfin/E1)
- Silkk The Shocker (No Limit/Gutta/E1)
- Daryle Singletary (E1, formerly on Audium/Koch)
- Slash's Snakepit
- Slaughterhouse (former)
- Slim Thug (Boss Hogg/E1)
- Smile Empty Soul
- Some Girls
- Splendora
- Soulja Boy
- Spoken
- Stabbing Westward
- Ringo Starr
- Styles P (D-Block/Ruff Ryderz/E1)
- Syleena Johnson
- Skull Gang (Skull Gang/E1/Koch Records)
- Straight Line Stitch
- Sundy Best
- Maggie Szabo

== T ==
- Tamia
- Terrance Quaites
- Texas Hippie Coalition
- Tha Dogg Pound (Doggystyle/E1)
- Tha Realest (Black Diamond/E1)
- The Blue Stones
- The Game
- The Lumineers
- Through the Eyes of the Dead
- Throwdown (2009)
- Time for Three (Tf3) 3 Fervent Travelers (2010)
- Token
- Torus
- Toxic Holocaust
- Trick Trick
- TRU (No Limit/Gutta/E1)
- Trust Company (2010)
- Torture T (Torturenati Records/E1)

== U ==
- Underoath
- Unearth
- Unk (Big Oomp/E1)
- The U.N (Diplomat/E1)

== V ==
- Will Varley
- Jim Verraros (TTL/E1)

== W ==
- Warren G (TTL/E1)
- Doug Wamble
- Dale Watson
- Westurn Union (Doggystyle/E1)
- Within the Ruins
- Wu-Tang Clan

== X ==
- Xzibit (Open Bar/E1)

== Y ==
- Young V (Gutta/E1)
- Yung Berg

== Z ==
- Zardonic
- Zoroaster

== See also ==
- E1 Music
- List of record labels
