= Weightless =

Weightless may refer to:

- Weightlessness, the condition that exists for an object or person when they experience little or no acceleration

== Arts, entertainment, media ==
- Weightless (novel), a 2015 novel by Sarah Bannan

=== Film ===
- Song to Song, a 2017 American film by Terrence Malick, originally titled Weightless
- Weightless (film), a 2018 American film by Enda Walsh
- Weightless, a 2009 documentary film about the making of the Jakob Bro album Balladeering

=== Music ===
- Weightless Recordings, a U.S. record label

==== Albums ====
- Weightless (Animals as Leaders album), and a song from that album, 2011
- Weightless (Katie Herzig album), 2006
- Weightless (The Skinny Boys album), 1986
- Weightless EP, by Secondhand Serenade, 2011
- The Weightless EP, by Stillman, 2004

==== Songs ====
- "Weightless" (All Time Low song), 2009
- "Weightless" (Wet Wet Wet song), 2008
- "Weightless" (Marconi Union song), 2011
- "Weightless", by The Skinny Boys from their eponymous album Weightless, 1986
- "Weightless", by Sissel Kyrkjebø from their album All Good Things, 2000
- "Weightless", by Old '97 from their album Satellite Rides, 2001
- "Weightless", by Stillman from their album The Weightless EP, 2004
- "Weightless", by Katie Herzig from their eponymous album Weightless, 2006
- "Weightless", by Black Lab from their album Passion Leaves a Trace, 2007
- "Weightless" (Chinese: 無重力), by Will Pan from his album 007 (Chinese: 零零七), 2009
- "Weightless", by Natasha Bedingfield from their album Strip Me, 2010
- "Weightless", by Animals as Leaders from their eponymous album Weightless, 2011
- "Weightless", by God Is an Astronaut from their album Origins, 2013
- "Weightless", by Within the Ruins from their album Elite, 2013
- "Weightless", by Northlane from their album Node, 2015
- "Weightless", by Hayden James from the album Between Us, 2019
- "Weightless", by Elbow from their album Giants of All Sizes, 2019
- "Weightless", by Spacey Jane from their album Sunlight, 2020
- "Weightless", by Romy from their album Mid Air, 2023
- "Weightless", by Infernal, 2017

== Other uses ==
- Weightless (wireless communications), proposed proprietary open wireless technology standard
- Weightless (religion), when a body becomes so heavy during displacement that it is very difficult to move it, or even impossible to move it at all

== See also ==
- Weightlessness (film), 2019 Iranian film
- Weight (disambiguation)
- Less (disambiguation)
