= Exoplanet (album) =

Studio album by The Contortionist
- Released: August 31, 2010; January 22, 2016 (remastered)
- Recorded: 2010
- Studio: System Recordings, Boston, Massachusetts; Voltaic Recording Studio, Indianapolis, Indiana
- Genre: Progressive metal; deathcore; djent
- Length: 48:14
- Label: Good Fight
- Producer: Ken Susi

The Contortionist chronology
Apparition (2009)	Exoplanet (2010)	Intrinsic (2012)

Professional ratings
Review scores
Source	Rating
The New Review	4.5/5

Exoplanet is the debut studio album by American progressive metal band The Contortionist, released through Good Fight Entertainment on August 31, 2010. A remastered edition of the album was released on January 22, 2016.

A live music video for the song "Primal Directive" was released on July 1, 2022. The video was filmed during the band's Reimagined Tour from 2018. The video was released to coincide with the band's 2022 tour where Exoplanet and Language were performed in their entirety.

== Concept ==
Guitarist Robby Baca explained:

The three Exoplanet tracks represent the focal point of the album's concept, musically the songs are tied together somehow to show that they are a part of a time line. That’s why — if you listen closely — there are repeated musical ideas throughout. These three tracks are the definitive songs of the album. Part one is a journey outside our solar system. Part two is a journey in between galaxies (interstellar void) and part three is the colonization and failure of human life on another planet. The songs were not originally meant to be consecutive and tied together, but that’s how everything came together, and we rolled with it.

The lyrics on the album focus on space, interstellar travel, and the journey to reach and colonize another habitable planet, hence the title of the album. Four tracks on the album are re-worked and renamed versions of material from their 2009 EP Apparition; the song "Eyes: Closed" was re-worked as "Flourish", "Infection" was re-worked as "Expire", "Realms" was re-worked as "Advent", and "Oscillator" was re-worked while keeping the original title. The lyrics of the re-worked songs were also re-written entirely in order to fit the overall concept of the album. The remaining 7 tracks, including the three title tracks, are all new material.

== Track listing ==
All tracks are written by The Contortionist.

No.	Title	Length
1.	"Primal Directive"	4:02
2.	"Flourish"	6:22
3.	"Expire"	3:45
4.	"Contact"	5:00
5.	"Advent"	3:17
6.	"Vessel"	4:57
7.	"Oscillator"	5:01
8.	"Axiom" (instrumental)	2:25
9.	"Exoplanet I: Egress"	4:12
10.	"Exoplanet II: Void"	3:33
11.	"Exoplanet III: Light"	5:46
Total length:		48:14

== Personnel ==
The Contortionist

- Jonathan Carpenter – vocals, keyboards, lyrics
- Robby Baca – guitar, keyboards, programming
- Cameron Maynard – guitar, keyboards
- Joey Baca – drums
- Christopher Tilley – bass

Production

- Produced, engineered & mixed by Ken Susi (Unearth)
- Mastered by Alan Douches, @ West West Side Music, New York
- Additional production & keyboards by Jordan King
- Additional keyboards by Alex Ruger
- Management by Ben Lionetti & Jason Rudolph
- Design & layout by Sons of Nero
