= Phenomena II =

Studio album by Within the Ruins
- Released: August 23, 2024
- Recorded: 2023–2024
- Length: 50:05
- Label: MNRK
- Producer: Joe Cocchi

Within the Ruins chronology
Black Heart (2020)	Phenomena II (2024)

Singles from Phenomena II
- 1. "Castle in the Sky" Released: June 26, 2024; 2. "The Last Son" Released: July 29, 2024; 3. "Demon Killer" Released: August 23, 2024

Professional ratings
Review scores
Source	Rating
Powermetal.de	7.5/10
This Day in Metal	8/10

Phenomena II is the seventh studio album by American metalcore band Within the Ruins. It was released on August 23, 2024. It is a sequel to their 2014 album Phenomena and their first studio album since their 2009 debut Creature not to feature a track from the "Ataxia" instrumental track series, although it features a sequel track to the instrumental "Enigma" from the first Phenomena album.

Guitarist Joe Cocchi stated about the album, "We had written a handful of songs, and we were searching for inspiration. We wanted to celebrate the tenth anniversary of Phenomena, because it was a pinnacle point of our career. I wrote a demo that reminded [vocalist Steve Tinnon] of Phenomena. So, it was his idea to create Phenomena II. The styles really aligned in terms of the unique guitar effects and the themes where each track tells a story from a comic book character's point-of-view."

== Track listing ==
Phenomena II track listing
No.	Title	Length
1.	"Castle in the Sky"	5:04
2.	"Daywalker"	4:34
3.	"Demon Killer"	5:18
4.	"Level 12" (instrumental)	4:42
5.	"Eater of Worlds"	4:09
6.	"The Last Son"	4:03
7.	"Chaos Reigns"	5:04
8.	"Death Mask" (instrumental)	4:40
9.	"Corruption"	4:00
10.	"A World on Fire"	4:11
11.	"Enigma II" (instrumental)	4:20
Total length:		50:05

== Personnel ==
Within the Ruins

- Steve Tinnon – lead vocals
- Joe Cocchi – guitars, production, engineering, mixing
- Paolo Galang – bass, clean vocals
- Kevin McGuill – drums
