= Things We Think, But Never Speak =

Studio album by Like Monroe
- Released: October 14, 2014
- Recorded: Think Sound Studios
- Genre: Post-hardcore, metalcore
- Length: 39:25
- Label: eOne, Good Fight
- Producer: Drew Fulk

Things We Think, But Never Speak is the debut studio album by Houston, Texas post-hardcore band Like Monroe. The album was released on October 14, 2014 through eOne Music and Good Fight. It was recorded at Think Sound Studios in Greensboro, North Carolina with producer Drew Fulk (Motionless in White, The Amity Affliction, For All Those Sleeping). Two music videos have been released for the tracks "The Hills" and "So Beautiful" directed by Aaron Marsh (Of Mice and Men).

== Track listing ==
Tracklist
No.	Title	Length
1.	"Roswell"	3:46
2.	"The Hills"	3:38
3.	"Black Lungs" (featuring Garret Rapp of The Color Morale)	4:23
4.	"So Beautiful"	4:12
5.	"Changing Lanes"	3:36
6.	"We Will All Prevail"	3:23
7.	"Prison Flood"	3:49
8.	"Circle The Drain"	3:01
9.	"Crowsnest"	2:40
10.	"The Enemy"	3:23
11.	"Strange Lips"	3:34
Total length:		39:25

== Critical reception ==
Professional ratings
Review scores
Source	Rating
Substream Magazine	(4/5)
Cryptic Rock	(3.5/5)
New Transcendence	(4.5/5)

"While some may think the album’s energy steadily decreases as the songs go on, it’s actually more of a transition from loud and abrasive to calm and melodic. From metalcore to post-hardcore, raw screams to soulful singing, or shapeless chaos to structured verse-chorus form, Like Monroe manage to explore their roots, perfect their sound, and navigate the star system that is musical expression." - The Aquarian Weekly
