= The Contortionist =

American progressive metal band

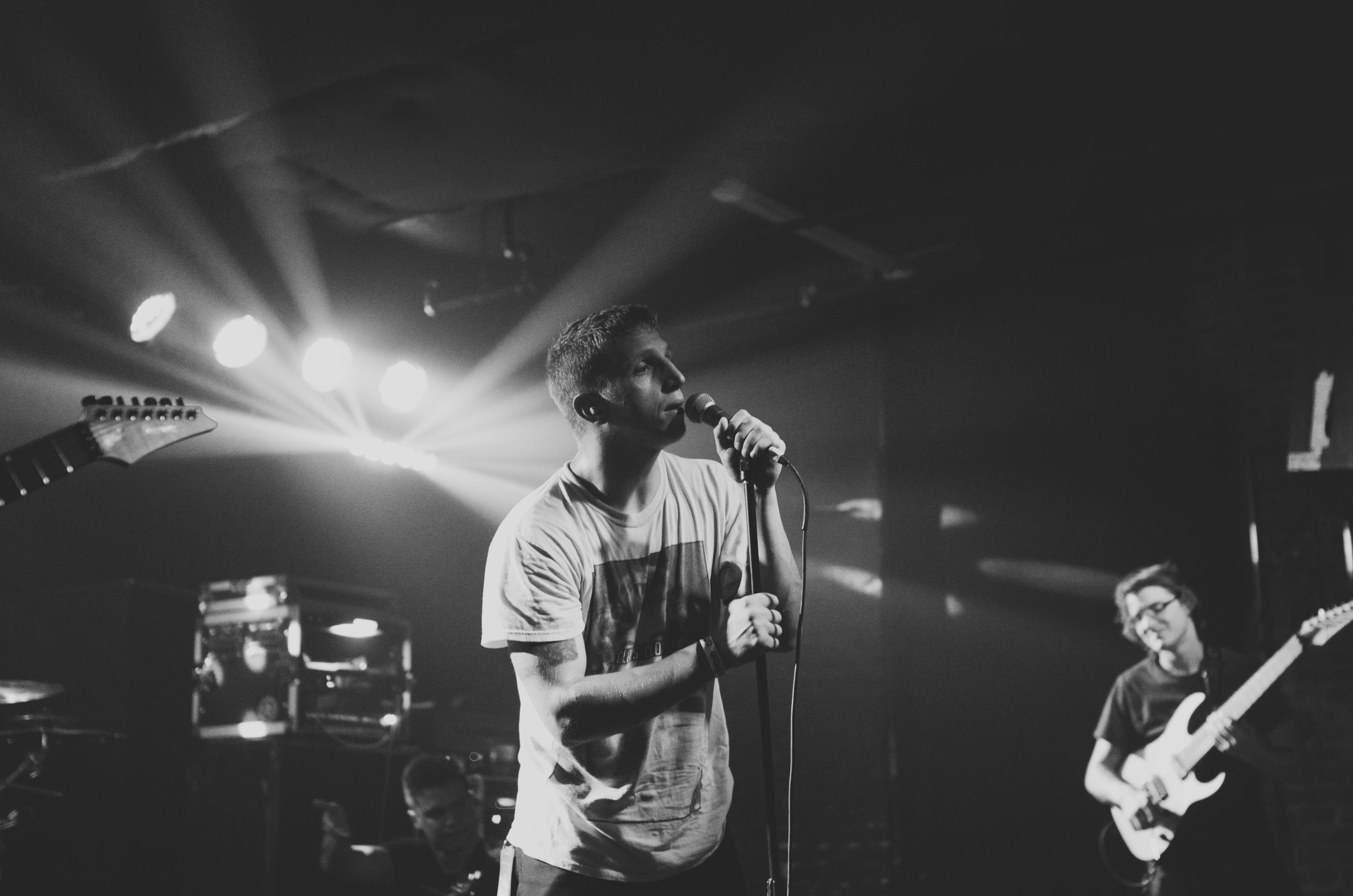
- The Contortionist performing in 2014

Background information
- Also known as: At the Hands of Machines (2007–2008)
- Origin: Indianapolis, Indiana, U.S.
- Genres: Progressive metal; progressive rock; deathcore (early)
- Years active: 2007–present
- Labels: eOne; Good Fight
- Members: Robby Baca; Joey Baca; Cameron Maynard; Michael Lessard; Eric Guenther; Jordan Eberhardt
- Past members: Jake Morris; Dave Hoffman; Jonathan Carpenter; Christopher Tilley
- Website: www.thecontortionist.net

The Contortionist is an American progressive metal band from Indianapolis, Indiana. Formed in 2007, the band consists of guitarists Robby Baca and Cameron Maynard, drummer Joey Baca, vocalist Mike Lessard, bassist Jordan Eberhardt, and keyboardist Eric Guenther. They have released four studio albums and three EPs. The band signed with eOne Music and Good Fight Entertainment in early 2010.

== History ==
The Contortionist formed in 2007 under the name At the Hands of Machines with vocalist Jake Morris, guitarists Robby Baca and Cameron Maynard, bassist Christopher Tilley, and drummer Joey Baca. The band's first release, the EP Sporadic Movements, was released later that year. At the Hands of Machines changed their name to The Contortionist following the EP's release and the same line-up recorded the EP Shapeshifter, which was released in September 2008. These two EPs featured a deathcore sound in contrast to the band's later works. Following the release of Shapeshifter, vocalist Jake Morris left the band and was replaced by Dave Hoffman, who also provided keyboards. The band entered Voltaic Recording Studio in early 2009 and released their third EP, Apparition, in September of that year. The EP continued the deathcore sound heard with Morris, but also showed the band incorporating elements of progressive metal into its music.

Hoffman departed the band in early 2010 and was replaced by Jonathan Carpenter. Not long after Carpenter's arrival, The Contortionist began work on their debut album, Exoplanet. Exoplanet was released on August 31, 2010, through Good Fight Entertainment. The album's sound continued the progressive metal/deathcore sound heard on Apparition, with lyrics exploring themes such as space and interstellar travel. Several of the album's songs are reworked songs from Apparition, featuring new lyrics written by Carpenter with slightly different musical passages. The band's second album, Intrinsic, was released on July 17, 2012. A month before the album's release, The Contortionist released their first music video for the song "Holomovement." The sound of Intrinsic differed from previous releases; the album still contained elements of deathcore, but had a greater focus on melody and atmosphere. Carpenter's lyrics focused on science fiction themes which are reflected in the music videos for "Causality" and "Dreaming Schematics".

In March 2013, Jonathan Carpenter announced his departure from the band. At the time, Carpenter and his longtime girlfriend (now wife) were expecting their first child. He left on good terms with the band to focus on his personal life and starting his family. Carpenter commented on his departure:

"It's going to be a jarring change of pace for my life, not being on the road most of the year. Making songs with the band and then performing them in front of the best fans has been a once in a lifetime experience. I wouldn't trade the perspective I've found in the past few years for anything. I got to meet so many amazing people and see a good chunk of the world. I absolutely intend to keep creating and playing music in the future, albeit in a more personal pursuit. I will miss seeing everyone in the TC family very much. I wish the best to all of my band buds and everyone who supports live music and all this heavy banger music we've been making. I feel very excited for my future with the love of my life and our pups, and our little one on the way. Music has always been one of my passions and that's what drew me to this band in the first place. The music comes first, and I know that the talent of the band will rise above this member change and they will find a new arrangement that will blow your minds."

Robby Baca also commented on Carpenter leaving:

"We are sad to see John go, but at the same time remain fully supportive of his decision. We look forward to the process of finding a new vocalist and writing a new record."

Mike Lessard of Last Chance to Reason took over vocal duties for upcoming shows until the band found a permanent replacement. Mike Lessard commented on filling in for Carpenter:

"I'm happy to be helping my friends in The Contortionist for the next few months on tour as a temporary vocalist. I'll be returning to my duties in Last Chance to Reason once these dates are finished in May. I look forward to seeing a bunch of new and familiar faces in the months to come."

On June 21, 2013, The Contortionist announced via their Facebook page that Mike Lessard was officially their new vocalist.

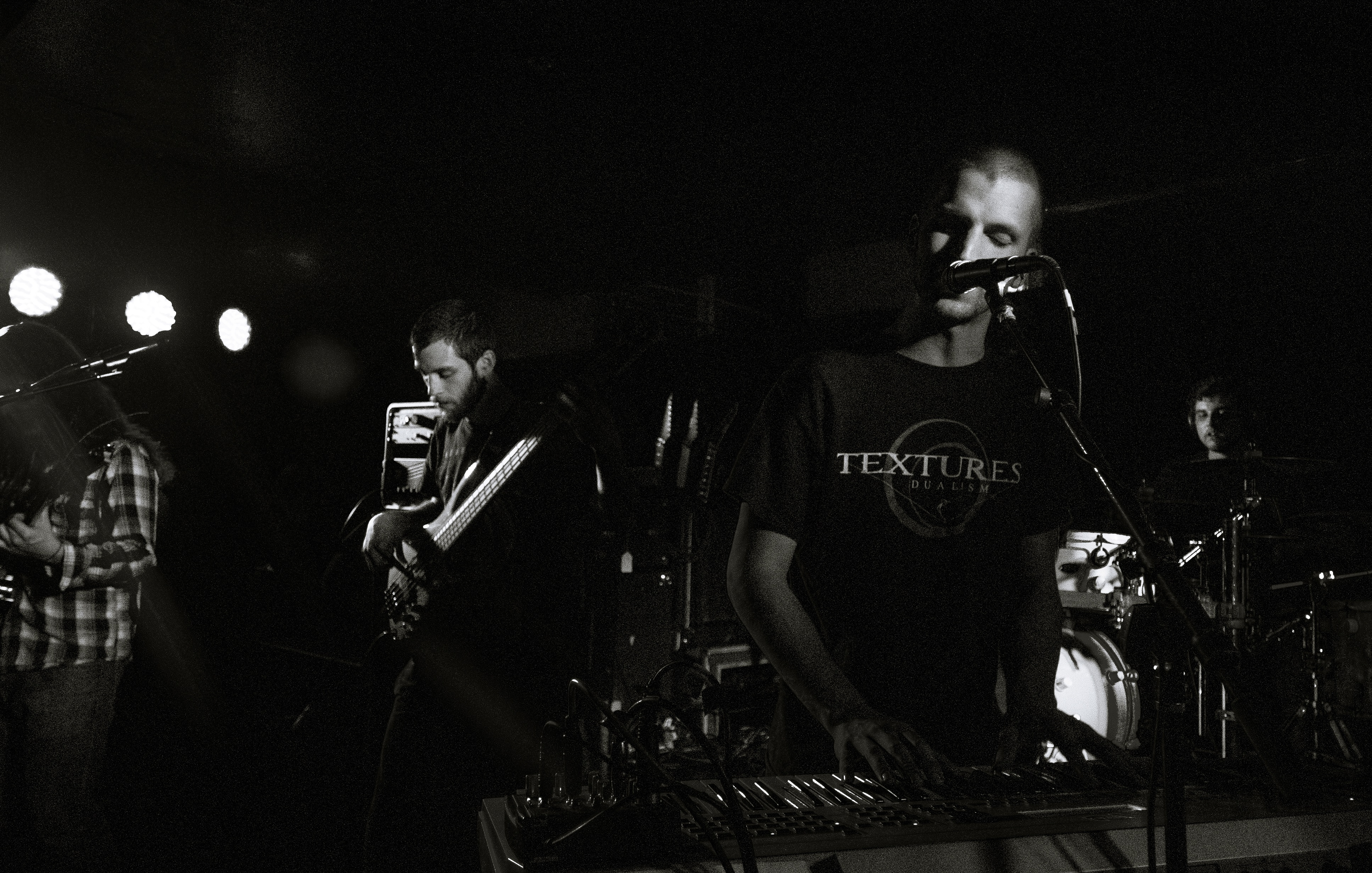
The Contortionist in 2012

On April 23, 2014, The Contortionist announced that they had completed the recording of their third full-length album. It was produced by Jamie King (Between the Buried and Me, He Is Legend, the Human Abstract, among many others). On June 26, 2014, The Contortionist announced on their Facebook page that their new album, entitled Language, would be released September 16, 2014 through eOne and Good Fight Music. It was also officially made known that bassist Christopher Tilley had been replaced by former Scale the Summit bassist, Jordan Eberhardt, for unannounced reasons. During an AMA session, which took place on September 12, a question regarding Christopher Tilley's departure was answered, the band's response was: "Touring and all that comes with it just wasn't what Tilley wanted to do anymore. We love Chris and wish him the best!"

The band released their fourth album, entitled Clairvoyant, on September 15, 2017. This album featured a softer sound, with predominantly clean vocals.

On August 9, 2019, the band released the EP Our Bones. The EP features two new full-length songs, an ambient interlude, and a cover of "1979", originally by The Smashing Pumpkins.

On 28 September, 2026, the band posted on Instagram with a comment saying, "something more." The video shows Lessard in a studio with music, seemingly new music by the band, playing.

== Musical style and influences ==
The Contortionist's musical style has been described as progressive metal and progressive rock. The band's early work showed one-time experiments in other metal genres outside their primary sound; their second EP Apparition has been described as deathcore. Robby Baca has stated that his influences include Planet X, Pat Metheny, Meshuggah, Allan Holdsworth, Between the Buried and Me, Dream Theater, The Dear Hunter, Textures, Deftones, Gojira, and Animosity. Former member Jonathan Carpenter also stated that his personal influences include Dream Theater and ambient composer Brian Eno. Other influences include Rush, Isis, and Cynic.

== Members ==
=== Current ===
- Robby Baca – guitars (2007–present); bass (2014); keyboards (2007–2014)
- Joey Baca – drums (2007–present)
- Cameron Maynard – guitars (2007–present)
- Michael Lessard – vocals (2013–present) (of Last Chance to Reason)
- Eric Guenther – keyboards (2014–present)
- Jordan Eberhardt – bass (2014–present) (formerly of Scale the Summit)

=== Former ===
- Jake Morris – vocals (2007–2008)
- Dave Hoffman – vocals, keyboards (2008–2010) (Ishia, ex-Boreworm, ex-Into the Silence, ex-Wounded Knee)
- Jonathan Carpenter – vocals, keyboards (2010–2013) (Foreign Waves)
- Christopher Tilley – bass (2007–2014)

== Discography ==
=== Studio albums ===
List of studio albums, with selected chart positions
Title	Album details	Peak chart positions			
Title	Album details	US	US Indie	US Rock	US Hard Rock
Exoplanet	Released: August 31, 2010; Label: Good Fight; Formats: CD, LP, DL	—	—	—	—
Intrinsic	Released: July 17, 2012; Label: eOne, Good Fight; Formats: CD, LP, DL	125	23	42	12
Language	Released: September 16, 2014; Label: eOne, Good Fight; Formats: CD, LP, DL	52	13	15	6
Clairvoyant	Released: September 15, 2017; Label: eOne, Good Fight; Formats: CD, LP, DL	135	8	26	7
"—" denotes a recording that did not chart or was not released in that territory.

=== Live albums ===
List of live albums
Title	Album details
Retrospective: Live from Atlanta	Released: January 30, 2023; Label: MNRK Heavy; Format: LP

=== EPs ===
List of extended plays
Title	EP details
Sporadic Movements (released under At the Hands of Machines)	Released: June 1, 2007; Label: Independent; Format: CD
Shapeshifter	Released: September 1, 2008; Label: Independent; Format: CD
Apparition	Released: September 24, 2009; Label: Independent; Format: CD
Our Bones	Released: August 9, 2019; Label: eOne, Good Fight; Format: CD, LP, DL

=== Singles ===
Year	Song	Album
2012	"Holomovement"	Intrinsic
2012	"Causality"	Intrinsic
2014	"Language I: Intuition"	Language
2014	"Primordial Sound"	Language
2017	"Reimagined"	Clairvoyant
2017	"Absolve"	Clairvoyant
2017	"Return to Earth"	Clairvoyant
2019	"Early Grave"	Our Bones

=== Music videos ===
Year	Song	Director
2012	"Causality"	
2012	"Dreaming Schematics"	
2014	"Language I: Intuition"	Corey Norman
2014	"Primordial Sound"	Corey Norman
2015	"The Parable" (Rediscovered)	Erez Bader
2015	"Language" (Rediscovered)	Erez Bader
2015	"Primordial Sound" (Rediscovered)	Erez Bader
2015	"The Source" (Rediscovered)	Erez Bader
2017	"Reimagined"	
2017	"Return to Earth"	
2019	"Early Grave"	
2020	"1979"	Michael Lessard
2022	"Primal Directive" (live)	Michael Lessard

== Concert tours ==
- This Is Where It Ends Tour – All Shall Perish, Carnifex, Fleshgod Apocalypse, Conducting from the Grave, The Contortionist
- To Catch a Predatour – The Acacia Strain, The Red Chord, Terror, GAZA, The Contortionist
- The Summer Slaughter Survivors Tour – Conducting from the Grave, The Contortionist, Scale the Summit, Volumes, Structures, Rings of Saturn
- Intrinsic Tour – The Contortionist, Jeff Loomis, Chimp Spanner, 7 Horns 7 Eyes
- 2012 Co-Headliner – Born of Osiris, Unearth, The Contortionist, Obey the Brave, Wolves at the Gate
- Frak the Gods Tour – Periphery, The Human Abstract, Textures, The Contortionist
- MetalSucks Tour – The Contortionist, Revocation, Fallujah, Toothgrinder
- The Coma Ecliptic Tour – Between the Buried and Me, Animals as Leaders, The Contortionist
- The Good Fight North American Tour – The Contortionist, Within the Ruins, I Declare War, Reflections, City in the Sea
- European Tour – Protest the Hero, The Faceless, The Contortionist, Destrage
- The Divinity of Purpose Tour – Hatebreed, Shadows Fall, Dying Fetus, The Contortionist
- Future Sequence Tour – Between the Buried and Me, The Faceless, The Contortionist, The Safety Fire
- Escape From the Studio Tour – Periphery, The Contortionist, Intervals, Toothgrinder
- Traced in Constellations Tour – Sleepmakeswaves, The Contortionist, Tangled Thoughts of Leaving
- Fall 2014 Tour – The Contortionist, Intervals, Polyphia
- 2015 North America Tour – The Contortionist, Chon, Auras
- Polaris North America Tour – Tesseract, The Contortionist, ERRA, Skyharbor
- Polaris United Kingdom Tour – Tesseract, The Contortionist, Nordic Giants
- 2016 North America Tour – The Contortionist, Monuments, Entheos, Sleepmakeswaves
- The Mothership Tour – Dance Gavin Dance, The Contortionist, Hail the Sun, Good Tiger, The White Noise
- European Unrest Tour – Periphery, The Contortionist, Destrage
- The Sonic Unrest Part II Tour – Periphery, The Contortionist, Norma Jean, Infinity Shred
- Colors 10th Anniversary Tour – Between the Buried and Me, The Contortionist, Polyphia, Toothgrinder
- The Stories We Tell Ourselves Tour – Nothing More, The Contortionist, Big Story, Kirra
- The Clairvoyant Tour – The Contortionist, Silent Planet, Skyharbor, Strawberry Girls, Sikth, AlithiA
- The Reimagined Tour – The Contortionist, Intervals
- Animals as Leaders 10 Year Anniversary Tour – Animals as Leaders, The Contortionist
- Performing Language and Exoplanet in Their Entireties - The Contortionist, Rivers of Nihil

== See also ==
- List of E1 Music artists
- Music of Indiana
