= Intrinsic (album) =

Studio album by The Contortionist
- Released: July 17, 2012
- Recorded: February – May 26, 2012
- Studio: Audiohammer Studios, Sanford, Florida
- Genre: Progressive metal; avant-garde metal; deathcore
- Length: 45:08
- Label: eOne; Good Fight
- Producer: Eyal Levi; Jason Suecof; Eric Guenther

The Contortionist chronology
| Exoplanet (2010) | Intrinsic (2012) | Language (2014) |

Singles from Intrinsic
- 1. "Holomovement" Released: June 11, 2012; 2. "Causality" Released: June 17, 2012

Professional ratings
Review scores
| Source | Rating |
|---|---|
| About.com | 4.5/5 stars |
| Metal Injection | 9/10 |
| NUVO | Positive |
| Sputnikmusic | 3/5 stars |

Intrinsic is the second studio album by American progressive metal band The Contortionist, released through eOne Music/Good Fight Entertainment on July 17, 2012. This is the band's last release with vocalist/keyboardist Jonathan Carpenter and bassist Christopher Tilley.

The album sold 3,600 copies in its first week, reaching no. 125 on the Billboard 200 chart.

== Release and promotion ==
On May 30, 2012, the band revealed the album title, track-listing, and artwork; they also announced various pre-order bundles. The first single, "Holomovement", was released on June 11, 2012. The band also released an animated video to go with the premiere. On July 16, the band released their very first music video for the song "Causality". A music video was released for "Dreaming Schematics" on December 3. The videos share a similar concept - they act as a part 1 and part 2; both were produced by KOTK Productions.

On October 3, 2012, vocalist/keyboardist Jonathan Carpenter released a track-by-track guide for each of the album's songs through Metal Sucks.

== Concept ==
Jonathan Carpenter commented:

Intrinsic‘s lyrics were aimed to be a science-fiction inspired conceptual storyline. It’s like a handful of puzzle pieces. Instrumentals that have different feels and styles. The Contortionist has always been about contrast, the heaviest and then the most beautiful. This provides a very wide range of emotions to write over. We want the listener to feel the ups and downs and to get engaged in the content. When piecing it all together lyrically… I wanted the concepts to be present without being overbearing. The fans who go looking for the details will find them and the casual listener can listen to any song and enjoy a small piece of the puzzle. Never leaving the boundaries of the mind, the first five songs range from mind/brain phenomena and reality theories to religion and mind trips. The last five are from the perspective of future patients coping with a shared reality scenario; a narrative on the potential of using technology to achieve a perfect dream you could feel and control with ease. There’s an eerie uncertainty to how a person’s psyche will react to that degree of extended consciousness.

== Track listing ==
All lyrics are written by Jonathan Carpenter; all music is composed by The Contortionist.

| No. | Title | Length |
|---|---|---|
| 1. | "Holomovement" | 6:30 |
| 2. | "Feedback Loop" | 5:09 |
| 3. | "Causality" | 4:28 |
| 4. | "Sequential Vision" | 3:56 |
| 5. | "Geocentric Confusion" | 5:50 |
| 6. | "Dreaming Schematics" | 4:36 |
| 7. | "Anatomy Anomalies" | 5:02 |
| 8. | "Cortical" | 4:43 |
| 9. | "Solipsis" | 1:37 |
| 10. | "Parallel Trance" (instrumental) | 3:22 |
| Total length: | | 45:08 |

An alternate version of "Parallel Trance" appears on iTunes.

== Personnel ==
The Contortionist

- Jonathan Carpenter — vocals, keyboards
- Robby Baca — guitar
- Cameron Maynard — guitar
- Joey Baca — drums
- Christopher Tilley — bass

Production

- Produced by Eyal Levi, Jason Suecof & Eric Guenther
- Engineered & mixed by Eyal Levi & Jason Suecof
- Mastered by Alan Douches, @ West West Side Music, New York
- Synthesizer by Eric Guenther
- Pro-Tools by John Douglass
- Management by Jason (Strong Management)
- Publicity by Bill Meis (Entone Group)
- Booking by Cody Delong (The Kenmore Agency)

== Charts ==
| Chart (2012) | Peak position |
|---|---|
| US Billboard 200 | 125 |
| US Top Hard Rock Albums (Billboard) | 12 |
| US Independent Albums (Billboard) | 23 |
| US Top Rock Albums (Billboard) | 42 |
| US Heatseekers Albums (Billboard) | 3 |
