= Our Bones =

EP by The Contortionist
- Released: August 9, 2019
- Genre: Progressive rock; progressive metal
- Length: 14:03
- Label: eOne; Good Fight
- Producer: John Douglass; The Contortionist

The Contortionist chronology
Clairvoyant (2017)	Our Bones (2019)

Singles from Our Bones
- 1. "Early Grave" Released: June 25, 2019

Our Bones is the third EP by American progressive metal band The Contortionist. It was released on August 9, 2019 through eOne Music and Good Fight Entertainment. The EP was self-produced by the band and John Douglass.

== Critical reception ==
Professional ratings
Review scores
Source	Rating
Already Heard	3.5/5 stars
Depth	8/10
Distorted Sound	7/10
Metal Injection	8/10

The EP received generally positive reviews from critics. Already Heard rated the EP 3.5 out of 5 and: "Overall, Our Bones is a pleasure to listen to. For a short EP and only 15 minutes of music, The Contortionist have managed to create a diverse snapshot that is sure to excite fans of their future." Depth praised the EP saying, "I'm very happy they've allowed us into the world of Our Bones, and I'm keen for whatever lies ahead."

Distorted Sound scored the EP 7 out of 10 and said: "Unlikely to do much more than whet the appetite for a lengthier release, Our Bones is a welcome aperitif, and a lively reminder that The Contortionist are still well worth our attention." Ricky Aarons writing for Metal Injection reviewed the EP stating: "Our Bones feels more like a calculated teaser than a definitive statement, but it looks like we can expect greater intensity and some classic songcraft from The Contortionist in the not-too-distant future."

== Track listing ==
No.	Title	Length
1.	"Follow"	3:46
2.	"Early Grave"	3:51
3.	"All Grey"	1:56
4.	"1979" (The Smashing Pumpkins cover)	4:29
Total length:		14:03

== Personnel ==
The Contortionist

- Michael Lessard – vocals
- Robby Baca – guitars
- Cameron Maynard – guitars
- Jordan Eberhardt – bass
- Joey Baca – drums
- Eric Guenther – keyboards

Additional personnel

- John Douglass – production, engineering
- The Contortionist – production
- Evan Sammons – engineering
- Jamie King – mastering, mixing
- Bobby Bates – photography
