= List of foreign films shot in Morocco =

Many foreign films have been shot in Morocco. The first were by the French film pioneer Louis Lumière Le chevrier Marocain. Orson Welles filmed his Othello there, which won the Palme d'Or prize at the Cannes Film Festival. In 1955, Alfred Hitchcock directed The Man Who Knew Too Much, set in Marrakesh and Casablanca, while in 1962 David Lean shot the desert scenes of Lawrence of Arabia in Morocco.

== Overview ==
The following is a list of some films that were entirely or partially shot in Morocco:

- 1951: Othello, directed by Orson Welles
- 1953: Flight to Tangier, directed by Charles Marquis Warren
- 1954: Ali Baba and the Forty Thieves, directed by Jacques Becker
- 1955: Captain Gallant
- 1956: The Man Who Knew Too Much
- 1962: Lawrence of Arabia, starred Peter O'Toole, Omar Sharif
- 1965: Our Man in Marrakesh
- 1966: The Hand of Night
- 1967: The Burning, directed by Stephen Frears, starring Mark Baillie and Gwen Ffrangcon-Davies
- 1967: Oedipus Rex, directed by Pier Paolo Pasolini, starred Franco Citti
- 1970: Patton, directed by Franklin Schaffner
- 1975: The Man Who Would Be King, directed by John Huston
- 1976: Emanuelle in Bangkok, directed by Joe D'Amato
- 1977: Jesus of Nazareth, directed by Franco Zeffirelli
- 1977: The Arms of Venus, directed by Mircea Drăgan
- 1981: Rollover, directed by Alan Pakula, starred Jane Fonda
- 1985: Harem, directed by Arthur Joffé, starred Nastassja Kinski
- 1985: The Jewel of the Nile, directed by Lewis Teague, starred Michael Douglas
- 1987: The Living Daylights, directed by John Glen, starred Timothy Dalton and Maryam d'Abo
- 1988: The Last Temptation of Christ, directed by Martin Scorsese, starred Willem Dafoe
- 1989: Marrakech Express, directed by Gabriele Salvatores
- 1990: The Sheltering Sky, directed by Bernardo Bertolucci, starred John Malkovich and Debra Winger
- 1994: Highlander III: The Sorcerer, directed by Andrew Morahan, starred Christopher Lambert
- 1997: Kundun, directed by Martin Scorsese
- 1998: Hamilton, directed by Harald Zwart
- 1998: Hideous Kinky (Marrakech Express)
- 1999: The Mummy, directed by Stephen Sommers, starred Brendan Fraser
- 2000: Gladiator, directed by Ridley Scott, starred Russell Crowe
- 2000: Rules of Engagement, directed by William Friedkin, starred Tommy Lee Jones, Samuel L. Jackson and Guy Pearce
- 2001: Black Hawk Down, directed by Ridley Scott
- 2001: The Mummy Returns, directed by Stephen Sommers, starred Brendan Fraser
- 2001: Spy Game, directed by Tony Scott, starred Robert Redford and Brad Pitt
- 2002: Astérix et Obélix: Mission Cléopâtre (France), directed by Alain Chabat, starred Gérard Depardieu and Jamel Debbouze
- 2002: Live from Baghdad, directed by Mick Jackson, starred Michael Keaton
- 2004: Alexander, directed by Oliver Stone
- 2004: Exorcist: The Beginning, directed by Renny Harlin, starred Stellan Skarsgård
- 2004: Hidalgo, directed by Joe Johnston
- 2004: Les temps qui changent, directed by André Téchiné
- 2005: Kingdom of Heaven, directed by Ridley Scott
- 2005: Sahara, directed by Breck Eisner, starred Matthew McConaughey, Steve Zahn, Penélope Cruz and William H. Macy
- 2006: Babel, directed by Alejandro González Iñárritu
- 2006: The Hills Have Eyes, directed by Alexandre Aja
- 2007: Arn – The Knight Templar, directed by Peter Flinth
- 2007: The Bourne Ultimatum, directed by Paul Greengrass
- 2007: The Hills Have Eyes 2, directed by Martin Weisz
- 2008: Arn – The Kingdom at Road's End, directed by Peter Flinth
- 2008: Body of Lies, directed by Ridley Scott, starred Leonardo DiCaprio and Russell Crowe
- 2009: Pope Joan, directed by Sönke Wortmann, starring John Goodman and Johanna Wokalek
- 2010: Inception, directed by Christopher Nolan
- 2010: Of Gods and Men, directed by Xavier Beauvois
- 2010: Prince of Persia: The Sands of Time, directed by Mike Newell
- 2010: Sex and the City 2, directed by Michael Patrick King
- 2011: Captain Phillips, directed by Paul Greengrass
- 2011: Hanna, directed by Joe Wright
- 2011: The Source, directed by Radu Mihăileanu
- 2013: The Bible, produced by Roma Downey and Mark Burnett
- 2013: Only Lovers Left Alive, directed by Jim Jarmusch
- 2014: American Sniper, directed by Clint Eastwood
- 2014: Mission: Impossible – Rogue Nation, directed by Christopher McQuarrie
- 2014: Son of God, produced by Roma Downey and Mark Burnett
- 2015: A.D. The Bible Continues, produced by Roma Downey and Mark Burnett, starring Juan Pablo di Pace, Babou Ceesay, Richard Coyle and Vincent Regan
- 2015: Spectre, directed by Sam Mendes
- 2016: The Yellow Birds
- 2016: Damascus Cover
- 2016: Watch Them Fall
- 2016: War Dogs
- 2016: Whiskey Tango Foxtrot
- 2016: 13 Hours
- 2016: A Hologram for the King
- 2016: Our Kind of Traitor
- 2017: Raees
- 2017: Tiger Zinda Hai
- 2019: John Wick: Chapter 3 – Parabellum
- 2019: Men in Black: International
- 2021: Redemption Day, directed by Hicham Hajji
- 2022: Inventing Anna
- 2022: Dirty Angels
- 2023: Gladiator II
- 2023: Indiana Jones and the Dial of Destiny
- 2024: Mary (2024 film)
- 2024: Raqqa: Spy vs. Spy
- 2024: Lonely Planet (film)
- 2025: Sirāt
- 2026: The Odyssey
- 2026: Matchbox (2026 film)

== Other movies ==
- Cleopatra

== Foreign TV series shot in Morocco ==
- Cleopatra
- The Young Indiana Jones Chronicles
- Game of Thrones (season 1 and 2)
- Homeland (TV series) (season 3, 6 and 8)
- Prison Break (TV) (2016)
- Tyrant (TV series) (2016)
- Jack Ryan (TV series) (2018)
- Vagabond (TV series) (2019)
- The Wheel of Time (TV series) (2021)
- SAS: Rogue Heroes (2022)
- No Man's Land (2022) (season 2)
- The Witcher (TV series) (2023) (season 3)
- Outer Banks (TV series) (2024) (season 4)
- Atomic (TV series) (2024)

== See also ==
- Aït Benhaddou
- List of Absolutely Fabulous episodes
