= Black Heart (Within the Ruins album) =

Studio album by Within the Ruins
- Released: November 27, 2020
- Recorded: 2019–2020
- Genres: Progressive metalcore; deathcore; melodic death metal; djent
- Length: 44:30
- Labels: eOne Music; Good Fight Music
- Producers: Joe Cocchi; Jim Fogarty

Within the Ruins chronology
Halfway Human (2017)	Black Heart (2020)	Phenomena II (2024)

Singles from Black Heart
- 1. "Deliverance" Released: September 25, 2020; 2. "Black Heart" Released: October 26, 2020

Black Heart is the sixth studio album by American metalcore band Within the Ruins. It was released on November 27, 2020. It is Within the Ruins' first studio album to feature vocalist Steve Tinnon, who joined in 2018, replacing longtime member Tim Goergen, who left due to ongoing health issues. Like their previous album Halfway Human, Black Heart was praised by critics for the incorporation of new elements such as clean vocals in addition to screaming/death growls. The album sold 850 units its first week, debuting at #186 on the Billboard Top 200 Album Sales chart.

== Background and promotion ==
On December 13, 2018, Within the Ruins announced via Instagram that they'd be re-entering the studio to record a brand new album that was originally scheduled for a 2019 release.

After nearly two years of delay, the album release date was announced on September 25, 2020, in conjunction with the release of the album's first promotional single and music video, "Deliverance".

On October 26, 2020, Within the Ruins released a music video to accompany the album's second promotional single and music video, the title track "Black Heart". Speaking on the song, Tinnon stated:

"We're extremely excited to release the video for the title track to our new album, Black Heart! We really enjoyed making this one and getting to tell a bit more of the story behind the music. It's a very angry, personal song, and a lot of the tracks stem from what it's about. It's an important track in regards to the overall theme of the record, and we couldn't be happier with how the video turned out!"

== Critical reception ==
The album received praise from critics. Brutal Planet reviewer Dustin Peterson stated about the band's sound:

"Within the Ruins takes Meshuggah's 'Djent' start / stop, off kilter style and adds elements of classic metal and video game aesthetics. There are literally points in this record where the guitarist is making sounds I heard in Ninja Gaiden while playing 8-Bit Nintendo 30 years ago. The intensity, speed and accuracy of the band as a whole is on par with the best."

Additional praise for the album came from Everything Is Noise reviewer JP Pallais:

"Within the Ruins is one band that have been consistently releasing quality music in a genre over-saturated with bands all trying to achieve the same thing. In the case of WTR, the music blends technical metalcore, deathcore, progressive metal, and melodic death metal into one fluid entity with a massive emphasis on technicality. Despite being relentless in terms of how brutal the music is, Within the Ruins know how to make their tunes just as melodic and atmospheric as well."

== Track listing ==
No.	Title	Length
1.	"Domination"	3:57
2.	"Deliverance"	4:34
3.	"Black Heart"	4:32
4.	"Open Wounds"	4:00
5.	"Eighty Sixed" (instrumental)	5:03
6.	"Devil in Me"	3:34
7.	"Hollow"	3:55
8.	"Outsider"	4:15
9.	"RCKLSS"	4:28
10.	"Ataxia V" (instrumental)	6:12
Total length:		44:30

== Personnel ==
Within the Ruins

- Steve Tinnon – lead vocals
- Joe Cocchi – guitars
- Paolo Galang – bass, clean vocals
- Kevin McGuill – drums

Additional personnel

- Joe Cocchi – production, engineering, mixing
- Jim Fogarty – production, engineering
- Scott Lee – associate production
- Fernando Lemus – vocal engineering
- Josh Wickman – mastering, mixing
- Cameron Gray – artwork
