= Halfway Human (album) =

Studio album by Within the Ruins
- Released: March 3, 2017
- Recorded: May 22 – July 19, 2016 (Coach); June 14–22, 2016 (Zing)
- Studios: Coach Studios; Zing Studios
- Genres: Metalcore; deathcore; djent; progressive metal
- Length: 51:40
- Labels: eOne Music; Good Fight Music
- Producer: Joe Cocchi

Within the Ruins chronology
Phenomena (2014)	Halfway Human (2017)	Black Heart (2020)

Singles from Halfway Human
- 1. "Death of the Rockstar" Released: November 21, 2016; 2. "Beautiful Agony" Released: January 1, 2017; 3. "Objective Reality" Released: February 24, 2017

Halfway Human is the fifth studio album by American metalcore band Within the Ruins. It was released on March 3, 2017. It is Within the Ruins' first studio album to feature bassist Paolo Galang, who joined in 2015. The album was praised by critics for the incorporation of new elements such as clean vocals on the part of Paolo and Tim Goergen (both a first for Within the Ruins) in addition to screaming/death growls. It is the final album featuring long-time vocalist Tim Goergen, who would leave the band in February 2018 citing ongoing health issues. The album debuted at number 191 on the Billboard 200, selling 4,025 copies in its first week.

== Background and recording ==
On May 3, 2016, Within the Ruins announced via a YouTube video that they'd be re-entering the studio to record a follow-up to 2014's Phenomena. Via a release that accompanied the video, the band noted that they'd be recording at their own studio under the leadership of guitarist Joe Cocchi. Within the Ruins noted that they would then be returning to Zing studios in Westfield, Massachusetts to engineer vocals with Jim Fogarty, who had worked with renowned metal acts such as Killswitch Engage and The Devil Wears Prada. Jim had helped engineer the band's debut Creature, which was also produced at Zing in 2008.

On May 6, speaking on the writing process, guitarist Joe Cocchi stated that the band took a different approach towards the recording of Halfway Human that would result in a "different sounding" album:

"The writing process was a bit different for this album," says Cocchi. "We took a step back and kind of reviewed some of our older material. Typically we'd rush and blast out a group of songs and then hit the studio. At the time it felt right. And It had a more organic feel. Now because of a combination of maturity and honestly just feeling sick of the same old formula, we really focused on creating something different sounding."

Cocchi concluded:

"We went back to a more organic style of writing and production. I personally was finally able to abandon a lot of my writing habits or 'rules,' if you will. No more 'oh, that part doesn't really sound like us, have to change that,' type of bullshit. Doing that created a fresher sound. This is the most raw and extreme sounding material we've ever written. Keep an eye out for studio blogs and more updates."

== Promotion and release ==
On August 8, 2016, the band released 17 seconds of audio from a new track via a video on their Facebook page.

The album release date was announced on November 21, 2016, in conjunction with the release of the album's first promotional single, "Death of the Rockstar".

Speaking on the single, guitarist Joe Cocchi stated:

"'Death of the Rockstar' stems from our distaste for the current state of the music industry. The song is straight forward and speaks for itself. We live in an era where mindlessness and fads now trump true art and creativity. The music industry is polluted. Please enjoy."

On December 3, to promote Halfway Human, it was announced that Within the Ruins would join Born of Osiris in support on their "The New Reign Tour" along with Volumes, Oceans Ate Alaska, and Fire from the Gods.

On January 11, 2017, exclusively through popular blog Metal Injection, Within the Ruins released a music video to accompany the album's second promotional single, "Beautiful Agony". Speaking on the video, Cocchi stated:

"It has a darker vibe than most of our previous material and this video totally conveys that. Justin Reich did an amazing job with the video!"

Starting on February 2, the band released three "making of" videos via their YouTube channel to share with fans the experience of recording Halfway Human from Zing studio. The videos chronicled the band's consumption of vast quantities of Miller Lite beer, and (new to Within the Ruins' established sound) the engineering of new bassist Paolo Galang's clean vocals, which were met with anticipation and praise by commenters.

On March 2, Within the Ruins published a music video for the album's third promotional single "Objective Reality" (which had been released on February 24) on YouTube. The video was produced by Justin Reich and was the second video released in promotion of the album. The album was released on March 3, 2017.

== Critical reception ==
Professional ratings
Review scores
Source	Rating
HXC	4/5
Invicta	9.5/10
Itdjents	8.0/10
Metal Hammer	5/7
Metal Injection	7.5/10
New Transcendence	8.5/10

The album received praise from critics, who noted the change and maturity of Within the Ruins' sound, specifically the inclusion of clean vocals. Sputnikmusic reviewer Sebastian gave the album 4.5/5 starts, praising Galang's cleans and the introduction of guitar solos while maintaining Within the Ruins' signature "guitar-wankery". Sebastian stated:

"Halfway Human, for all of its many strengths, proves mainly that Within the Ruins are not only at the top of their game, but the top of the genre. Having spent years mastering their craft, they have released what may be their best yet, with more explosive guitar layers, powerful vocals, and an ever-present spine of drums and bass. Their ability to keep fresh without resorting to cheesy tactics is something to be admired. And if anyone dare challenge Within the Ruins for their crown, then they better be at their best, because there's little that can stop them now."

Additional praise for Paolo Galang's clean vocals came from itdjents reviewer Rodney Fuchs:

"The biggest change found on Phenomena might be the use of clean vocals. And how does it fit the music? Phenomenally, as it turns out! Bassist Paolo Galang stepped up to sing on those tracks, and hearing him on songs like "Death of a Rockstar" or "Beautiful Agony" is quite convincing. Imagine how those cleans would fit into their old songs (just think about "Feeding Frenzy"). Makes you curious, doesn't it? The music of Within the Ruins really profits of the clean, melodic vocals in the choruses."

Fuchs gave the album an 8.0/10, summarizing:

"Halfway Human is still a great record that is pure fun to listen to. It might not be the most innovative work out there, but if you are into melodic heavy music, beautifully sung choruses and a hearty portion of groove, you will love it nonetheless!"

Metal Injection writer Jeremy Ulrey believed the album to be a "transitional album" that would yield a more "nuanced experienced melding of styles" on future efforts. Ulrey gave the album a 7.5/10 praising Cocchi's guitar work and McGuill's drumming, and even drawing parallels to the sound of bands like Gojira, Fear Factory, and Cynic on "Ivory Tower" and "Objective Reality" respectively. Ulrey did note that he felt Galang's clean vocals only stood out on certain songs, and that on most songs they simply "existed". On the album as a whole, Jeremy states:

"Within the Ruins are on the right track with this minor deviation in style, with the only problem being that it's just that: too minor a deviation in style. The songs that deviate the most from their tried-and-true format are the ones that work the least, yet the ones that update their tech-melodic deathcore style with clean choruses – otherwise declining to get too fancy – see the band pulling things off nicely."

== Track listing ==
No.	Title	Length
1.	"Shape-Shifter"	4:34
2.	"Death of the Rockstar"	3:51
3.	"Beautiful Agony"	4:32
4.	"Incomplete Harmony"	4:27
5.	"Bittersweet"	4:49
6.	"Objective Reality"	4:34
7.	"Absolution"	4:37
8.	"Ivory Tower"	4:37
9.	"Sky Splitter"	4:00
10.	"Ataxia IV" (instrumental)	6:52
11.	"Treadstone"	4:31
Total length:		51:40

Japanese edition bonus track
No.	Title	Length
12.	"Grand Illusion"	4:07
Total length:		55:47

== Personnel ==
Within the Ruins

- Tim Goergen – lead vocals
- Joe Cocchi – guitars
- Paolo Galang – bass, clean vocals
- Kevin McGuill – drums

Additional personnel

- Joe Cocchi – production, engineering
- Jim Fogarty – additional production
- Josh Wickman – mastering, mixing
- Scott Baldwin Lee – management
- Angryblue and Justin Kamerer – illustrations, sesign
- Jeremy Saffer – photography

== Charts ==
Chart (2017)	Peak position
US Billboard 200	191
