= Clairvoyant (album) =

Studio album by The Contortionist
- Released: September 15, 2017
- Genres: Progressive rock; progressive metal
- Length: 54:12
- Labels: eOne; Good Fight
- Producer: Jamie King

The Contortionist chronology
Language (2014)	Clairvoyant (2017)	Our Bones (2019)

Singles from Clairvoyant
- 1. "Reimagined" Released: June 5, 2017; 2. "Absolve" Released: July 21, 2017; 3. "Return to Earth" Released: August 25, 2017

Professional ratings
Review scores
Source	Rating
Exclaim!	7/10 stars
Metal Injection	8.5/10 stars
MetalSucks	5/5 stars

Clairvoyant is the fourth studio album by American progressive metal band The Contortionist, released on September 15, 2017 through eOne Music and Good Fight Entertainment. It has been described as somewhat of a departure from their previous heavy sound, moving the band more toward a progressive rock style.

== Track listing ==
All tracks are written by The Contortionist.

No.	Title	Length
1.	"Monochrome (Passive)" (instrumental)	4:57
2.	"Godspeed"	3:47
3.	"Reimagined"	3:22
4.	"Clairvoyant"	7:37
5.	"The Center"	7:12
6.	"Absolve"	5:20
7.	"Relapse"	6:18
8.	"Return to Earth"	6:16
9.	"Monochrome (Pensive)"	9:23
Total length:		54:12

== Personnel ==
The Contortionist

- Michael Lessard – vocals
- Robby Baca – guitar
- Cameron Maynard – guitar
- Jordan Eberhardt – bass
- Eric Guenther – keyboards
- Joey Baca – drums

Production

- Produced by Jamie King

== Charts ==
Chart (2017)	Peak position
US Billboard 200	135
