= Omen (EP) =

EP by Within the Ruins
- Released: May 24, 2011
- Genre: Metalcore; progressive metal
- Length: 17:10
- Label: Victory
- Producer: Joe Cocchi

Within the Ruins chronology
Invade (2010)	Omen (2011)	Elite (2013)

Omen is the third EP by American metalcore band Within the Ruins. It was released on May 24, 2011 through Victory Records. It features two new songs and two covers. Omen would be the band's last release featuring Mike Beaujean on bass and Jay Van Schelt on guitar. Additionally, it would be the last release to feature two guitarists, with Cocchi taking over sole guitar duties in the third studio album Elite. It would also be the band's last release for Victory Records, as they would go on to sign with eOne Music and Good Fight Music in November 2012.

Following Omen's initial release, Victory Records released limited edition vinyl pressings in three colors, all of which included an MP3 download card. Of the three colors offered, only 600 red, 300 green, and 100 "clear with black smoke" were pressed.

On October 11, 2011, the band released a music video for the song "Controller". The video featured scenes of the band performing the song and performing a Reservoir Dogs–inspired getaway scene.

== Background ==
Beginning on March 2, 2011, Victory Records posted a series of videos to their YouTube channel following the band through pre-production of their new EP, which would become Omen.

On the band's choice to cover Metallica's "Fight Fire with Fire", Cocchi stated:

"Of course, Metallica was up there on the list, and after spending some time going through their discography we thought 'Fight Fire With Fire' would suit us best. It's a fun song, fast as fuck, and a bit challenging. It's also not as popular as a lot of their other songs. We wanted to choose a Metallica song that no one's really done before."

On the band's choice to cover Kansas' "Carry On Wayward Son", Cocchi stated:

"I don't think it's something that anyone would expect us to do, which is why we chose it. We spent a good amount of time arranging the song and attempting to add some new elements to it without completely 'butchering' it. It's definitely going to be a challenge for us, but that's the point after all."

== Critical reception ==
Professional ratings
Review scores
Source	Rating
HeavyBlogIsHeavy	4/5

HeavyBlogIsHeavy writer Jimmy Rowe gave the EP a 4/5, calling "Controller" and "Infamy" his favorite two Within the Ruins songs to date. Conversely, he found the Kansas cover out of place following the two "insane tracks" that preceded it. He stated:

"Even though the two covers (which are half of the EP) are quite lackluster, the two new songs are the best two songs the band has written, so this EP is definitely worth a listen, just treat this like a 2-track EP. If anything, it made me look forward to their next release, which is bound to be amazing."

== Track listing ==
No.	Title	Length
1.	"Controller"	4:02
2.	"Infamy"	4:14
3.	"Carry On Wayward Son" (Kansas cover)	4:54
4.	"Fight Fire with Fire" (Metallica cover)	4:00
Total length:		17:10

== Personnel ==
Within the Ruins

- Tim Goergen – vocals
- Joe Cocchi – lead guitar, production
- Jay Van Schelt – rhythm guitar
- Mike Beaujean – bass
- Kevin McGuill – drums
