= Elite (album) =

Studio album by Within the Ruins
- Released: February 26, 2013
- Genres: Metalcore; progressive metal; mathcore
- Length: 39:11
- Labels: eOne Music; Good Fight Music
- Producers: Josh Wickman; Joe Cocchi

Within the Ruins chronology
Omen (2011)	Elite (2013)	Phenomena (2014)

Singles from Elite
- 1. "Feeding Frenzy" Released: February 4, 2013

Elite is the third studio album by American metalcore band Within the Ruins. The album sold 3,750 copies in its first week (roughly double what Invade sold) and saw Within the Ruins' first appearance on the Billboard 200, peaking at the 133 spot. It is their first release for eOne Music and Good Fight Music following their departure from Victory Records in 2012. It is also their first release featuring only one guitarist, following the departure of Jay Van Schelt in 2012. The track list for the album was revealed on February 14, 2013.

To promote the album, the song "Feeding Frenzy" was released as a single on February 4, 2013, with an accompanying lyric video. The video was published to the band's YouTube channel on the same day.

On February 26, the same day the album was released, a music video directed by Kevin J. Custer was released for "Feeding Frenzy". On July 22, a music video was released for the song "New Holy War" and published to the band's YouTube channel.

== Background and recording ==
On March 20, 2012, Victory Records posted a pre-production update video to their YouTube featuring Cocchi and McGuill working on demos for their upcoming album, which would become Elite.

The band would begin to record the album during the spring of 2012 at Dreadcore Studios in White Lake Township, Michigan working again with Joshua Wickman, who produced their second album Invade at Dreadcore in 2011.

They published a studio update video to their YouTube channel on May 8, 2012, chronicling their progress. The band would post a follow-up video on June 22, 2012.

In an interview with music news website MindEqualsBlown in 2013, Cocchi spoke about the benefits of returning to a familiar studio and working with a familiar producer:

"When we did Invade, Josh was still learning," tells Cocchi of the five weeks the band spent with Wickman working on Elite. "We were learning new ways and figuring things out that made the recording [of Invade] easier for us and made it come out better. So when we got to do Elite, we already had a system with Josh. We knew how we were going to do everything. We still experimented and tried out different shit. It just flowed. We had a better schedule. When we did Invade, we would track for six hours and then go out and party and grill. Then we would wake up, record whatever, then repeat. I think it's funny because it shows it has that feel to it, to me at least. When we did Elite, we were like, okay, schedule. We'll go to the gym at 8 in the morning with Josh, then go eat breakfast, then we would start tracking at 10. Then go to 8 o'clock [in the evening]. I think we were a little bit more responsible and professional if you will when doing this album."

Cocchi also noted that the band spent considerably more time on the lyrical content and vocals on Elite than they had on Invade. Where in the past only a "few days" were left to record vocals, on Elite the vocal engineering received as much attention as the drums and guitars. Speaking more on Invade, Cocchi noted that on Elite the guitar riffs were much more varied:

"All the songs are in different keys with this album, where with Invade a lot of the riffs and parts of songs were interchangeable in a way. It all definitely sounded kind of the same after awhile, I'll admit that."

Within the Ruins signed for eOne Music and Good Fight Music in November 2012. Speaking on their departure from Victory Records, and progress towards Elite, guitarist Joe Cocchi stated:

"This is extremely exciting for us. We're proud to be a part of this new family. We look forward to growing as a band with eOne / Goodfight now behind us, and we're thankful to be working with people who care.The new album is complete! It's also completely different so we're very excited for our fans to hear it."

Professional ratings
Review scores
Source	Rating
AllMusic	3/5 stars
Exclaim!	7/10

== Track listing ==
No.	Title	Length
1.	"Terminal" (instrumental)	1:09
2.	"Solace"	2:59
3.	"Feeding Frenzy"	3:41
4.	"New Holy War"	3:42
5.	"The Charm"	3:26
6.	"Ataxia II" (instrumental)	5:09
7.	"Elite"	3:29
8.	"I, Blaspheme"	3:48
9.	"Absolute Hell"	3:42
10.	"Weightless"	3:25
11.	"Dreamland" (instrumental)	4:41
Total length:		39:11

Notes

- The instrumental "Dreamland" features audio clips of Franklin D. Roosevelt's famous inauguration speech during his First inauguration.

== Personnel ==
Within the Ruins

- Tim Goergen – vocals
- Joe Cocchi – guitars
- Andrew Tate – bass
- Kevin McGuill – drums

Additional personnel

- Joe Cocchi – production
- Josh Wickman – production, engineering, mixing
- Leah Urbano and Scott Lee – management
- Nanouk De Meijere and Eric Powell – booking
- Cameron Gray – illustrations, artwork, design
- Jeremy Saffer – photography

== Charts ==
Chart (2013)	Peak position
US Billboard 200	133
US Independent Albums (Billboard)	23
US Top Hard Rock Albums (Billboard)	5
US Heatseekers Albums (Billboard)	2
US Top Rock Albums (Billboard)	35
