= Exi(s)t =

Studio album by Reflections
- Released: October 22, 2013
- Recorded: Audio Hammer Studios; Orlando, Florida
- Genre: Progressive metalcore, djent, deathcore
- Length: 42:39
- Label: eOne, Good Fight
- Producer: Eyal Levi

Reflections chronology
The Fantasy Effect (2012)	Exi(s)t (2013)	The Color Clear (2015)

Singles from Exi(s)t
- 1. "My Cancer" Released: September 10, 2013

Exi(s)t is the second studio album by American metalcore band, Reflections. The album was released October 22, 2013 through labels eOne Music and Good Fight Entertainment. The album was produced by Eyal Levi, who has produced albums for bands such as August Burns Red, the Black Dahlia Murder, Motionless in White, Unearth, and Whitechapel.

The first single from Exi(s)t, titled "My Cancer," was released for download through iTunes and all other digital retailers on September 10, 2013. Reflections simultaneously released a lyric video for the single through their YouTube channel. Vocalist Jake Wolf explained "My Cancer" and some of the background to their music writing: "This song was written to speak to a lot of people in my life and I hope that other people can use it the same way and connect with us... we aren't writing music as a gimmick. We write music to express our struggles and triumphs to try and let people know that they are not alone. We couldn't be more excited for everyone to hear the new song. Hopefully everyone enjoys the new album."

The album was leaked a few days prior to its actual release date.

== Chart performance ==
Exi(s)t debuted at #179 on the Billboard 200 chart, selling 1,972 copies within the first week of being released. The album made it onto five Billboard charts:

- Heatseeker Chart – #6
- Hard Rock Chart – #12
- Independent Album Chart – #35
- Top Current Album Chart – #179
- Digital Albums Chart – #130

The album also made it onto four of iTunes' album charts—three U.S. charts and one Canadian chart:

- iTunes Metal Album Chart – #1
- iTunes Rock Album Chart – #15
- iTunes Canadian Album Chart – #91
- iTunes Album Chart (all genres) – #68

Guitarist Charles Caswell was excited to have made it onto the charts: "We want to sincerely thank everyone for the continuing support of our debut record. It's unreal to think our music hit the charts! We can't express enough how much it means to us!"

== Reception ==
Professional ratings
Review scores
Source	Rating
Headbang 'n Buttonmash	8/10 stars
The Circle Pit	7.5/10 stars
Me Gusta Reviews	4/5 stars
Metal Blast	1.5/5 stars
New Noise Magazine	3.5/5 stars

Exi(s)t was well received by most critics, though some had nothing good to say of the album. Austin Weber from No Clean Singing spoke very positively, stating "Exi(s)t is a big step up from Reflections' promising but not yet diverse enough debut, The Fantasy Effect. Sonically, Reflections have matured into a band capable of giving us a very nasty, massive-sounding assault of heaviness, and yet the undercurrents of sadness and beauty that find their way into the music counterbalance the aggression nicely. The end result is both catchy and calming, a byproduct of Reflections writing in a more sophisticated format then most of their peers. With Exi(s)t, Reflections have just climbed up from the pile into elite status." Dave from Hellhound Music also had much positive to say of the album: "Every song on Exi(s)t is a sonic roller coaster blazing through with enormous depth and shockingly-raw personal exposition."

Metal Blast gave a very negative review, stating that Exi(s)t "frankly just isn't very good" and that "I rarely regret listening to an album... Exi(s)t... is one of those albums."

== Track listing ==
All tracks are written by Reflections.

Standard Edition
No.	Title	Length
1.	"Exit"	3:19
2.	"Delirium"	2:48
3.	"Vain Words from Empty Minds"	5:04
4.	"Bridges"	3:36
5.	"Lost Pages" (featuring Becka Graham)	5:35
6.	"My Cancer"	2:55
7.	"Candle"	4:14
8.	"This House"	5:21
9.	"Stories Through Storms"	4:41
10.	"Exist"	5:06
Total length:		42:39

== Personnel ==
Reflections

- Jake Wolf – lead vocals
- Patrick Somoulay – guitar
- Charles Caswell – guitar, backing vocals
- Francis Xayana – bass
- Cam Murray – drums

Additional personnel

- Eyal Levi – production, recording, and mixing
- Alan Douches – mastering
- Jason Suecof – mix engineering
- John Douglas – assistant engineer
- Jeremy Frost – guitar technician
- Ronn Miller – drum technician
- Daniel Wagner – artwork and layout
- Jason Mageau – management
- Eric Powell – booking agent
- Greg Johnson – intro music production on "Exit"
- Becka Graham – vocals on "Lost Pages"
