= The Color Clear =

Studio album by Reflections
- Released: September 18, 2015
- Recorded: The Machine Shop
- Genres: Metalcore, djent, progressive metal, melodic hardcore
- Length: 38:16
- Labels: eOne, Good Fight
- Producer: Will Putney

Reflections chronology
Exi(s)t (2013)	The Color Clear (2015)	Willow (2020)

Singles from The Color Clear
- 1. "Actias Luna" Released: August 18, 2015

The Color Clear is the third studio album by American metalcore band Reflections. The album was released on September 18, 2015, through eOne Music and Good Fight Entertainment. It was recorded and produced by Will Putney in Belleville, New Jersey.

A music video was released for the first single from the album "Actias Luna" on August 18, 2015. To promote the album, a tour was held during the winter months at the end of 2015 and beginning of 2016.

== Content ==
=== Musical direction ===
With this album, the band's musical direction shifted greatly from their earlier heavy roots to a more melodic sound, which led to a lot of mixed reviews and confusion amongst fans. Vocalist Jake Wolf explained "It’s a sound that was found while writing The Fantasy Effect and lost in the midst of writing and recording our album Exi(s)t."

=== Lyrics ===
In an interview with NewNoise Magazine, Wolf explained that "It wasn’t until the process of writing and making The Color Clear that I was able to find myself again." He also went on to state that many of the topics included on the album reflect his "years of physical, mental and emotional abuse, chemical dependency, more traumatizing events than I care to remember, and years of self harm."

=== 10th Year Anniversary ===
On September 18th, 2025, Reflections announced the Instrumental and Remastered version of The Color Clear. It has been remastered by current bassist of the band, Elliot Merriman.

== Track listing ==
No.	Title	Length
1.	"Pseudo"	3:43
2.	"Autumnus"	4:44
3.	"Sadist"	2:44
4.	"Limbo"	4:22
5.	"Shadow Self"	2:59
6.	"Butterfly Effect"	2:33
7.	"Amulet"	4:11
8.	"Actias Luna"	4:33
9.	"Translucence"	3:56
10.	"Transparence"	4:28
Total length:		38:16

== Personnel ==
- Jake Wolf – lead vocals, guitars
- Patrick Somoulay – guitars
- Francis Xayana – bass
- Nick Lona – drums

=== Additional personnel ===
- Will Putney – production, mixing, mastering
- Elliot Merriman - remastering

== Chart history ==
- Debuted at No. 6 on the Heatseekers Albums Chart.
- Debuted at No. 15 on the Independent Albums Chart
- Debuted at No. 96 on the Billboard 200 Chart
