= The Fantasy Effect =

Studio album by Reflections
- Released: April 28, 2012
- Genres: Progressive metalcore, djent
- Length: 39:17
- Label: Self-released
- Producer: Reflections

Reflections chronology
The Fantasy Effect (2012)	Exi(s)t (2013)

Singles from The Fantasy Effect
- 1. "Advance upon Me Brethren" Released: December 12, 2011

The Fantasy Effect is the debut studio album by American metalcore band, Reflections. The band released a single titled "Advance upon Me Brethren" on December 12, 2011, which later appeared on the album as track six. They were unsigned at the time of release, but soon after releasing The Fantasy Effect, Reflections were signed to record labels eOne and Good Fight. A remastered/remixed edition of The Fantasy Effect was released on April 28, 2022 for the record's 10th anniversary. Most of the production was done by current Vildhjarta drummer, Buster Odeholm, with additional support from vocalist Jake Wolf and Johan Liljeblad.

== Track listing ==
All tracks are written by Patrick Somoulay and Bo Blood, except where noted.

Standard Edition
No.	Title	Music	Length
1.	"Ceilings"		3:13
2.	"Ms. Communication"		2:29
3.	"Good Push"	Charles Caswell	5:10
4.	"Picture Perfect"	Patrick Somoulay, Bo Blood, Jake Wolf	3:45
5.	"An Artifact"		4:57
6.	"Advance Upon Me Brethren"		4:48
7.	"Lost..." (Instrumental)	Patrick Somoulay, Jake Wolf, Charles Caswell	1:31
8.	"...And Found"	Patrick Somoulay, Bo Blood, Jake Wolf	6:03
9.	"Rotations"		7:21
Total length:			39:17

Bonus hidden track
No.	Title	Length
10.	"Sandblasted Skin" (Pantera cover)	3:02
Total length:		42:19

== Reception ==
Professional ratings
Review scores
Source	Rating
Real Metal Reviews	9/10 stars
New-Transcendence	9.4 stars on a 10 point scale
Me Gusta Reviews	4/5 stars

The Fantasy Effect was generally received as an exceptionally good album by several reviewers. The only unfavorable comments made with the album from critics were the production value and the quality of Jake's vocals.

== Personnel ==
Reflections

- Jake Wolf – lead vocals
- Patrick Somoulay – lead guitar
- Charles Caswell – rhythm guitar, backing vocals
- Francis Xayana – bass
- Bo Blood – drums
