= Language (The Contortionist album) =

Studio album by the Contortionist
- Released: September 16, 2014
- Recorded: April 2014
- Studio: The Basement Recording
- Genres: Progressive metal; progressive rock
- Length: 48:45
- Labels: eOne; Good Fight
- Producer: Jamie King

The Contortionist chronology
Intrinsic (2012)	Language (2014)	Clairvoyant (2017)

Singles from Language
- 1. "Language I: Intuition" Released: July 14, 2014; 2. "Primordial Sound" Released: September 2, 2014

Language is the third studio album by American progressive metal band The Contortionist. The album was released under eOne Music/Good Fight Entertainment on September 16, 2014. It is the first studio album to feature Michael Lessard of Last Chance to Reason, who replaced Jonathan Carpenter. The album debuted at #52 on the Billboard 200 chart, as well as #6 on the "Hard Rock" chart and #15 on the "Rock" chart.

== Background ==
The band started the writing process in January - a short update was posted via Facebook stating on January 16, "Writing ... excited for the next album!" Throughout the month of April the band made several updates, one revealed that they entered the studio with producer Jamie King at The Basement Recording Studio. On April 23, the band released a final statement, "That's a wrap. The album is recorded. Jamie King is a genius. We couldn't be more excited about this."

On June 26, both, the album title and release date were announced. The first album teaser was uploaded to YouTube on June 30. On July 9, the rest of the album details were revealed: artwork, track-listing, and various pre-order bundles. The song "Language I: Intuition" was made available for purchase via iTunes on July 14. On August 26, Alternative Press premiered the music video for "Language I: Intuition". The album's second single, "Primordial Sound", premiered on MetalSucks.net Tuesday, September 2.

=== Rediscovered edition ===
A "Rediscovered" version of the LP was released on November 24, 2015. The new version contains four re-worked tracks accompanied by four live session music videos. "Rediscovered was the result of our music naturally leading itself through new ideas developed onstage and in rehearsal. In a way, you could think of it as an artistically selfish move: we want these songs to continue their evolution and life. I can't wait to do something like this again. Reinterpreting the songs after months of experimenting onstage keeps the experience and energy fresh for everyone that celebrates them with us," said keyboardist, Eric Guenther. Commenting on the release, vocalist Michael Lessard stated: “We are very excited to finally share this rerelease of Language with everyone! We wanted to sit down with the songs that we’ve spent the last 14 months playing around the world, and give people a chance to see them in a new light. It’s been a pleasure getting a chance to rediscover these tracks and we hope everyone enjoys!” Videos for each rediscovered track were filmed by director Erez Bader, recorded/engineered by John Douglass and mixed and mastered by Jamie King. The live session video for "Language (Rediscovered)" was uploaded to YouTube on December 15, 2015 via eOneMusicUS.

== Critical reception ==
Professional ratings
Review scores
Source	Rating
Abandoned Hipster	7/10
Cryptic Rock	3.5/5
Metal Injection	Positive
New Noise Magazine	(positive)
Revolver Magazine	4/5
Soundscape	7/10
Sputnikmusic	4.2/5
Substream Magazine	5/5 stars
Ultimate Guitar Archive	7.3/10
Under The Gun Review	8/10

Language peaked at #52 on the Billboard 200 while receiving nearly universal acclaim among progressive metal circles.

Jeff Stevens of Prog Metal Zone said the album "strikes a seamless balance between heavy technicality and a strong progressive melodic approach along with a very heavy dose of jazz fusion to really make their sound one of the most exciting and sophisticated approaches in modern metal." Chris Grenville of The Monolith described the second and third tracks as "ten of the best minutes of progressive songwriting I’ve heard all year." He went on to draw parallels with previous progressive metal works stating that "comparisons with Cynic are easily made – the light/dark dynamic of the record; the timbre and intensity of the throaty screams; the feeling of weightlessness it gives you."

Weid Reitz of This is Not A Scene praised the album stating "The song concept and structure, as well as sound quality, are superior to any of the band’s previous releases." Chris Kemp of The Circle Pit lauded the band's potential to "lead the way for an entire genre" and concluded his review asserting the album would "take them very far, not just within the Prog metal scene but in all things artistic and entertaining". Stefan Andonov from Djent Mag praises the philosophical approach in the album by stating "Language reviews enormous subjects about the metaphysics in the universe and communication as a celestial phenomenon, the depth of the lyrics is mind-blowing."

== Track listing ==
All tracks are written by Joey Baca, Robby Baca, Eric Guenther, Michael Lessard and Cameron Maynard.

No.	Title	Length
1.	"The Source"	2:39
2.	"Language I: Intuition"	5:24
3.	"Language II: Conspire"	4:15
4.	"Integration"	5:46
5.	"Thrive"	6:04
6.	"Primordial Sound"	6:28
7.	"Arise"	3:58
8.	"Ebb & Flow"	7:06
9.	"The Parable"	7:05
Total length:		48:45

Rediscovered Edition
No.	Title	Length
10.	"The Source (Rediscovered) [Live Session]"	6:29
11.	"Language (Rediscovered) [Live Session]"	7:13
12.	"Primordial Sound (Rediscovered) [Live Session]"	5:12
13.	"The Parable (Rediscovered) [Live Session]"	5:32
Total length:		73:11

== Personnel ==
The Contortionist

- Joey Baca – drums
- Robby Baca – guitar, bass
- Jordan Eberhardt – bass solo on "Thrive"
- Eric Guenther – keyboards
- Michael Lessard – vocals
- Cameron Maynard – guitar

Production

- Jamie King – engineering, mixing, mastering
- Bobby Jeffries – art direction, design

== Charts ==
Chart (2014)	Peak position
US Billboard 200	52
US Top Hard Rock Albums (Billboard)	6
US Independent Albums (Billboard)	13
US Top Rock Albums (Billboard)	15
