= People Like a Happy Ending =

People Like A Happy Ending

Studio album by Stillman
- Released: May 29, 2007
- Genre: Indie rock
- Length: 47:45
- Label: TRL Music
- Producer: Chaz Craik

Stillman chronology
The Weightless EP (2004)	People Like A Happy Ending (2007)	Blood Dark Sea (2010)

People Like A Happy Ending is the first album by the artist Stillman (singer-songwriter Chaz Craik). It won Best Album at the Glasswerk New Music Awards 2007.

== Recording ==
Like his first release, The Weightless EP, this album was performed and recorded entirely at home with the exception of the drums. All the drum tracks on this album are actually edits of the drum takes from The Weightless EP, often cut into individual drum hits and sequenced to fit the new songs. The recording was very low budget and according to Craik the vocals were recorded in a wardrobe lined with a duvet and sofa cushions. The album was mixed in its entirety by Craik in his home studio. It was mastered at an unnamed studio but the masters were processed additionally by Craik to bring the dynamic level up to those found in other commercial recordings.

== Release ==
Craik released an initial private pressing of 500 units with a nine-song track listing. These were hand-numbered and given away for free to members of his mailing list. It was through this initial private pressing that he came to the attention of TRL Music who signed him to their label. A subsequent digital release followed on iTunes, Amazon Digital and various other digital outlets, with the album was expanded to eleven tracks with two new songs, "Blisters" and "They Mostly Come At Night".

== Reception ==
The album received numerous positive reviews from webzines and fanzines. Tasty Fanzine described it as "An album with depth that is rarely seen in his contemporaries." Toxic Pete called it "A beautiful piece of work from start to finish,"

It was featured on the front-page of ten European iTunes territories but failed to sell as many copies as the label had hoped, possibly due to limited PR budget available. TRL Music estimated the digital downloads to be equal to roughly a thousand physical CDs.

Despite this, Stillman was nominated in the Glasswerk New Music Awards 2007 in the Best Singer/Songwriter, Best Male and Best Album categories and won the Best Album award.

== Track listing ==
All tracks are written by Chaz Craik.

No.	Title	Length
1.	"Stillborn Moon"	4:24
2.	"The Thaw"	3:31
3.	"Blisters"	3:16
4.	"People Like A Happy Ending"	3:43
5.	"They Mostly Come At Night"	4:24
6.	"Patience"	3:49
7.	"Dilute to Taste"	5:54
8.	"Fading Fast"	4:09
9.	"Jack-in-a-Box"	4:55
10.	"The Hand That Feeds"	3:50
11.	"In The Margin"	5:50
