= Phenomena (Within the Ruins album) =

Studio album by Within the Ruins
- Released: July 22, 2014
- Genres: Metalcore; deathcore; progressive metal; mathcore
- Length: 47:16
- Labels: eOne Music, Good Fight Music
- Producers: Joe Cocchi; Josh Wickman; Jason Suecof

Within the Ruins chronology
Elite (2013)	Phenomena (2014)	Halfway Human (2017)

Phenomena is the fourth studio album by American metalcore band Within the Ruins. It was released on July 22, 2014. The track list for the album was revealed on June 10, 2014, along with the release of the first single "Gods Amongst Men". The album sold 4,067 copies in the United States in its first week and debuted at No. 72 on the Billboard 200.

== Composition ==
This is the first album where guitarist Joe Cocchi uses a 7-string guitar, using bass guitar strings to adopt an unconventionally low tuning and vastly increase the low range of the instrument.

In a 2014 interview with Loudwire, Joe Cocchi noted that parts of the instrumental "Enigma" reference themes from Super Mario Bros. and also Inspector Gadget.

Professional ratings
Review scores
Source	Rating
HeavyBlogIsHeavy	4/5
Metal Injection	7/10
Sputnikmusic	3.5/5

== Track listing ==
No.	Title	Length
1.	"Gods Amongst Men"	5:05
2.	"The Other"	3:33
3.	"Calling Card"	4:41
4.	"Hegira"	4:03
5.	"Ronin"	4:10
6.	"Enigma" (instrumental)	5:01
7.	"Clockwork"	4:01
8.	"Eternal Shore"	3:23
9.	"Dark Monarch"	4:08
10.	"Sentinel"	3:44
11.	"Ataxia III" (instrumental)	5:27
Total length:		47:16

== Personnel ==
Within the Ruins

- Tim Goergen – vocals
- Joe Cocchi – guitars
- Andrew Tate – bass
- Kevin McGuill – drums

Additional personnel

- Joe Cocchi – production, engineering
- Jason Suecof – production, mixing
- Josh Wickman – production, engineering, mixing, mastering, vocal engineering, vocal production
- Cameron Gray – illustrations, artwork
- Sean Marlowe – art direction, design
- Jeremy Saffer – photography

== Charts ==
Chart (2014)	Peak position
US Billboard 200	72
US Independent Albums (Billboard)	15
US Top Hard Rock Albums (Billboard)	11
US Top Rock Albums (Billboard)	25
