= Reflections (Minnesota band) =

American metalcore band

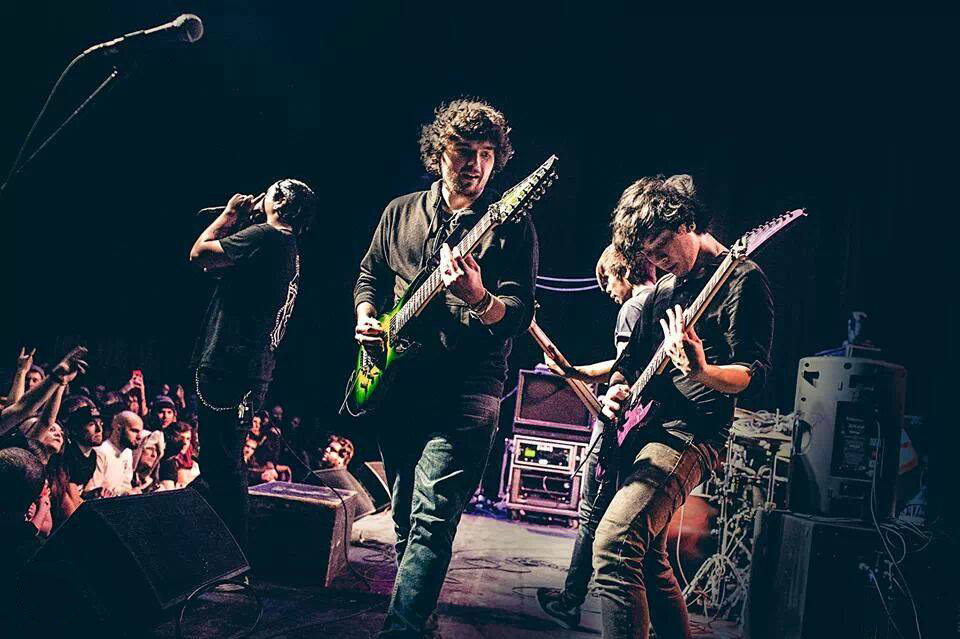
- Performing in 2014 at the Skyway Theatre in Minneapolis. Depicted from left to right: Jake Wolf, Charles Caswell, Francis Xayana, Patrick Somoulay, and Cam Murray (obscured by monitors).

Background information
- Origin: Twin Cities, Minnesota, U.S.
- Genres: Progressive metalcore; djent
- Years active: 2010–2026
- Labels: Independent; eOne; Good Fight
- Past members: Jake Wolf; Charles Caswell; Nick Lona; Bo Blood; Cam Murray; Alex Curry; Patrick Somoulay; Francis Xayana
- Website: Reflections on Facebook

Reflections was an American progressive metalcore band formed in the Twin Cities, Minnesota in 2010. Their logo is the Japanese Kanji 王 (Ō), meaning king.

== History ==
On April 28, 2012, Reflections released their debut album, The Fantasy Effect, which was home-produced and recorded by the band using Mixcraft 4, a Windows music recording and mixing program. Soon after releasing The Fantasy Effect, Reflections were signed to record labels eOne and Good Fight. Reflections' second album and record label debut, titled Exi(s)t, was released October 22, 2013. The album's first single, "My Cancer," was released for download through iTunes and all other digital retailers on September 10, 2013. Reflections simultaneously released a lyric video for the single through their YouTube channel. Exi(s)t debuted at #179 on the Billboard 200 chart, selling 1,972 copies within one week of release.

It was announced that work for the band's third album would commence sometime in February 2015. On August 18, 2015, they released a music video for the song "Actias Luna" from the then upcoming album. Later, the album title was revealed as The Color Clear and was released through eOne and Good Fight on September 18, 2015. It was their best numbers and charting to date with a first week total of 3,025 copies sold and debuting at #6 on the Heatseekers Albums Chart, #15 on the Independent Albums and #96 on the Billboard 200 Chart.

In late 2016, the band announced that they were to stop touring and take an indefinite hiatus.

In late 2019, the band announced the hiatus would be ending and releasing a song on December 11, 2019. Francis was welcomed back to the band along with new member Logan Young. On February 20, 2020, the band released their fourth album, Willow, featuring a much heavier, chaotic style similar to Exi(s)t era.

In 2021, the band released their EP titled Silhouette, consisting of 3 tracks written with guitarist Calle Thomer of Vildhjarta.

In 2022, to celebrate the 10 year anniversary of the band's debut album, Reflections released The Fantasy Effect: Redux, a completely re-recorded and re-arranged version of their debut full-length The Fantasy Effect.

In February 2023, vocalist Jake Wolf started the side project called "Surgeon".

On the October 22, 2023, Reflections released "Vain Words From Empty Minds" Redux as a single for their upcoming "Exi(s)t Redux" EP, releasing on the exact same date of 2024. Shortly after, Reflections releases "Scapegoat" as a surprise release.

On December 20, 2023, Reflections released a single titled "Alone"

On February 16, 2024, Reflections released "Deva" for their continuation of their "Silhouette" EP, "Shadow". On August 30th, 2024, Reflections released their second song from their upcoming EP, "Shadow", called "Anhedonia".

On January 21, 2026, amid Operation Metro Surge in Minnesota, Patrick Somoulay and Francis Xayana announced that they had left the band, citing irreconcilable personal differences with vocalist Jake Wolf.

On July 17, 2026. the band surprised released a new album titled "Crystal Eyes", and announced that the band will be breaking up. this is also their first and only album as a duo with Jake Wolf handling guitars, bass, and additional drums alongside vocals. with touring / session members Josh Solvedt and Elliot Merriman handling guitars and bass respectfully for the album.

== Musical style and influences ==
Reflections has been described as progressive metal, metalcore, and djent. They use seven-string guitars tuned to Drop F tuning (F–C–F–A♯–D♯–G–C).

Their influences include bands such as Pantera, August Burns Red, Gojira, the Tony Danza Tapdance Extravaganza, After the Burial, Born of Osiris, Architects, Structures, and Veil of Maya.

=== Band members ===
Final line-up

- Jake Wolf – lead vocals (2010–2026), drums (2011–2012, 2019–2026), rhythm guitar (2011–2026), lead guitar, bass (2026)
- Nick Lona – drums (2014-2026)

Former members

- Boris "Bo" Blood – drums (2010–2011)
- Alex Curry – rhythm guitar (2010–2011)
- Cam Murray – drums (2012–2014)
- Charles Caswell – guitar, backing vocals (2011–2014)
- Logan Young – guitar (2019–2021)
- Francis Xayana – bass (2010–2016)
- Patrick Somoulay – guitar (2010–2026)

Timeline

== Tours ==
=== 2012 ===
- Midwest Madness tour from October 7 to 14 with After the Burial and The Contortionist.

=== 2013 ===
- Goodfight North American Tour from March 30 to April 11 with The Contortionist, Within the Ruins, I Declare War and City in the Sea.
- Heavy MTL South of the border tour from July 30 to August 17 with All Shall Perish, Oceano, Within the Ruins, and Betrayal.
- Co-Headliner tour from October 19 to 30 with Erra.
- Small east coast run from November 29 to December 7 with Within the Ruins, Sworn In and Legion.

=== 2014 ===
- Celebrate the Chaos tour from January 30 to February 23 with Chimaira, Iwrestledabearonce, Oceano and Fit for an Autopsy.
- they toured U.S.A from March 7 to 22 with Veil of Maya and Erra.
- On May 15 – June 8 they toured U.S.A with For The Fallen Dreams, Obey The Brave, I The Breather and Sylar.
- In the Summer they toured North America from July 15 to August 21 with Scale the Summit, Glass Cloud, Erra, and Monuments.
- In the Fall they toured from September 16 to October 9 with After the Burial, Texas in July, I Declare War and Come the Dawn.
- From November 9 to 20 they toured with Betraying the Martyrs and Invent, Animate. The remainder of the tour past November 14 was cancelled after Betraying the Martyrs were denied entry into Canada.

=== 2015 ===
- On September 5–24 the band did a headlining tour with Toothgrinder, Exalt and Yüth Forever.
- From November 5 to December 11 the band embarked on Texas in July's farewell tour with Invent, Animate and To The Wind.

=== 2016 ===
- The Fury Tour from April 2 to 15 alongside labelmates Unearth, Ringworm, Culture Killer and Hollow Earth.
- Japan Tour with Protest the Hero, Cyclamen and Sithu Aye.

=== 2024 ===
- On January 19 to February 16, they toured with Veil of Maya, Left to Suffer, Angelmaker, Until I Wake and Alluvial on Veil of Maya's "[M]other" Tour

=== 2025 ===
- From September 21 to October 24, they toured the US with Invent Animate and Silent Planet celebrating The Color Clear 10 year anniversary on the “Bloom in Heaven II” Tour

== Discography ==
Studio albums

2012	The Fantasy Effect: Released: April 28, 2012; Label: Self-released
2013	Exi(s)t: Released: October 22, 2013; Label: eOne Music/Good Fight Entertainment
2015	The Color Clear: Released: September 18, 2015; Label: eOne Music/Good Fight Entertainment
2020	Willow: Released: February 20, 2020; Label: Self-released
2026	Crystal Eyes: Released: July 17, 2026; Label: Self-released

=== Extended plays ===
2021	Silhouette: Released: May 26, 2021; Label: Self-released
2024	Shadow: Released: November 29, 2024; Label: Self-released

=== Re-recording albums ===
2022	The Fantasy Effect Redux: Released: April 28, 2022; Label: Self-released
2024	Exi(s)t Redux: Released: October 22, 2024; Label: Self-released

Singles

- "Advance upon Me Brethren" (2011)
- "My Cancer" (2013)
- "Vain Words from Empty Minds" (2013)
- "Actias Lunas" (2015)
- "Shadow Self" (2015)
- "From Nothing" (2019)
- "Samsara" (2020)
- "Help" (2020)
- "Cicada" (2021)
- "Noir" (2021)
- "Coda" (2021)
- "Vain Words from Empty Minds - Redux" (2023)
- "Scapegoat" (2023)
- "Alone" (2023)
- “Deva” (2024)
- ”Anhedonia” (2024)
