= Katie Herzig =

American musician (born 1980)

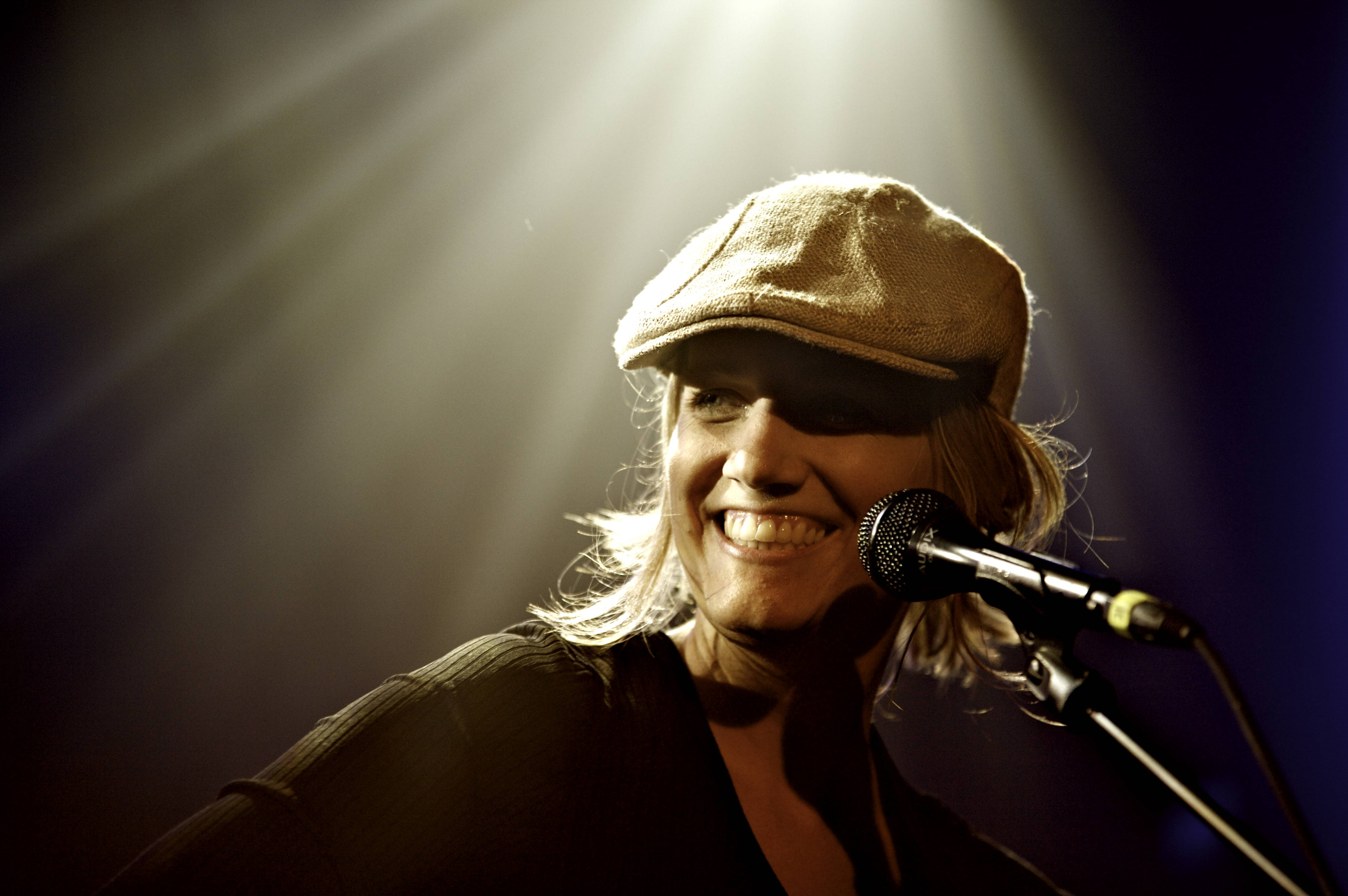

Background information
- Born: March 6, 1980 (age 46); California
- Origin: Fort Collins, Colorado
- Genres: Pop rock, indie pop
- Occupations: Musician, singer-songwriter
- Instruments: Vocals, guitar
- Years active: 1997–present
- Website: www.katieherzig.com

Katie Herzig (born March 6, 1980) is an American singer-songwriter whose songs have appeared often in movies, TV shows, and commercials.

== Personal life ==
Katie Herzig was born in California to a musical family. When she was one year old, her family moved to Fort Collins, Colorado, where she attended Rocky Mountain High School. Her sister sang opera. Herzig studied voice and played percussion in band and orchestra. In her senior year, she got an acoustic guitar from her father, which prompted her to begin playing the instrument. At the University of Colorado Boulder she wrote her first song in poetry class. She majored in journalism and was interested in documentaries and video editing. She was drawn to audio editing after using the computer programs Pro Tools and GarageBand, recording songs on a laptop in her bedroom.

== Career and music use ==
In college, Herzig formed the band Newcomers Home with Tim Thornton and Andrew Jed in the summer of 1997. Newcomers Home's music was a combination of bluegrass, folk, and pop. Herzig suffered from stage fright, and confined herself to singing backing vocals and playing the drums, but she began to play the guitar and became lead singer. The band broke up in 2006, leaving Herzig free to pursue the solo career she had already begun in 2004 when she released her debut album Watch Them Fall.

Two years later, Herzig released Weightless. She produced the album herself, recorded it at home using Pro Tools, and played most of the instruments: electric and acoustic guitar, banjo, keyboards, and percussion, in addition to her singing and songwriting. The song "Jack and Jill" appeared on the TV shows One Tree Hill and Pretty Little Liars, while several others appeared on Grey's Anatomy.

Her next album, Apple Tree (2008), was more pop-oriented. Its emotional songs like "I Hurt Too" and "Wish You Well" were used in TV dramas such as Bones, Grey's Anatomy, and Bored to Death as well as the 2014 horror film Unfriended. "Forevermore" appeared in a commercial, as did "Two Hearts Are Better Than One". In 2010, her single "Hey Na Na" was heard in the movie Going the Distance.

The Waking Sleep was released in 2011. "Lost and Found" appeared in the movie Family Weekend, in a commercial for the movie Saving Mr. Banks, in the season finale of Cougar Town season 3 and in a trailer for the movie Craigslist Joe. The title track, "The Waking Sleep", was featured in the "Torn Apart" episode of VH1's Mob Wives aired March 25, 2012. The song "Lost and Found" was also used in a 2013 Carnival Cruise Line commercial known as "Moments that Matter". "Best Day of Your Life" appeared in an Adventures by Disney TV Spot, “Adventure Together”, as well as the American teen/family drama television series Switched at Birth.

In September 2012, she worked for the campaign "30 Songs/30 Days" to support Half the Sky: Turning Oppression into Opportunity for Women Worldwide, a multi-platform media project inspired by Nicholas Kristof and Sheryl WuDunn's book.

In October 2015, "Say It Out Loud" was included in My Feet Keep Moving Still: Songs to Benefit Steps of Faith Foundation, an album to benefit Steps of Faith, a group that assists amputees.

== Awards and honors ==
In 2007, she was nominated for a Grammy award for Best Country Performance for the song "Heaven's My Home," which she wrote with Ruby Amanfu and which was performed by The Duhks.

== Discography ==
=== Studio albums ===
- Watch Them Fall (2004)
- Weightless (Marion-Lorraine, 2006)
- Apple Tree (Marion-Lorraine, 2008)
- The Waking Sleep (Downtown/Mercer Street, 2011)
- Walk Through Walls (Marion-Lorraine, 2014)
- Moment of Bliss (Marion-Lorraine, 2018)

=== Live albums ===
- Live in Studio: Acoustic Trio (2009)

=== Singles ===
Year	Single	Album
2011	Free My Mind	The Waking Sleep
2014	Walk Through Walls	Walk Through Walls
2017	Feel Alive	Moment of Bliss

=== Music videos ===
Year	Song	Album	Director
2008	Sweeter Than This	Weightless	
2011	Hey Na Na		
2011	Free My Mind	The Waking Sleep	Shih-Ting Hung
2011	Make a Noise	The Waking Sleep	Jeremy Cowart
2012	Lost and Found	The Waking Sleep	Becky Fluke
2014	The Waking Sleep	The Waking Sleep	Shih-Ting Hung
2014	Walk Through Walls	Walk Through Walls	Shih-Ting Hung
