= The Waking Sleep =

Studio album by Katie Herzig
- Released: September 20, 2011
- Label: Mercer Street Records, Marion-Lorraine Records
- Producer: Cason Cooley & Katie Herzig

Katie Herzig chronology
Live In Studio: Acoustic Trio (2009)	The Waking Sleep (2011)	Walk Through Walls (2014)

The Waking Sleep is the fourth studio album by the American singer-songwriter Katie Herzig. "Lost and Found" appeared on the episode "Your World" in the season 3 finale of the sitcom Cougar Town and on the episode "Take the Lead" in the eighth season of Grey's Anatomy. "Closest I Get" is also featured on Grey's Anatomy.

The album was released in the formats CD, Digital download and also is her first vinyl album.

== Track listing ==
All tracks are written by Katie Herzig.

Album release
No.	Title	Length
1.	"Free My Mind"	4:48
2.	"Make a Noise"	4:43
3.	"Way to the Future"	3:23
4.	"Best Day of Your Life"	3:23
5.	"Wasting Time"	3:51
6.	"Midnight Serenade"	4:05
7.	"Oh My Darlin'"	3:39
8.	"Closest I Get"	3:56
9.	"The Waking Sleep"	3:35
10.	"Lost and Found"	4:47
11.	"Daisies and Pews"	5:21
