= Like Monroe =

American metalcore band

- Origin: Houston, Texas, United States
- Genres: Metalcore, post-hardcore
- Years active: 2012–present
- Labels: Good Fight, eOne
- Members: Ty Johnson; Wade Concienne; Alex Lofton; Nathan Richie
- Past members: Jacob Cardinal; Chris Deckard
- Website: Like Monroe on Facebook

Like Monroe is an American metalcore band from Houston, Texas. They formed in the spring of 2012 and were signed to Good Fight Music and eOne Music a year after their formation. They released their debut album Things We Think, But Never Speak on October 14, 2014 through eOne Music.

== History ==
=== Formation of Like Monroe (2012–2013) ===
Like Monroe was first announced in 2012 after member changes were made and the music started to move in a different direction. Ty Johnson, Wade Concienne, Alex Lofton, and Jacob Cardinal were all members in the previous A Candle Lit City (formed in 2006) with a completely different vocal approach, musical content, and overall purpose. The band released their first single "The Enemy" in November 2013 and introduced themselves into the music scene.

=== Signing to Goodfight and first album (2014–2016) ===
On March 4 the band announced through their official Facebook page that they have signed with Good Fight and eOne Music to release their debut album later that fall. The band tapped producer Drew Fulk for their record and would release the first single "The Hills" off the upcoming album in September of that year. The band was able to land a support slot for All That Remains and AVATAR for a string of shows in September.

In support of their new record Things We Think, But Never Speak the band embarked on a fall tour with Eyes Set To Kill and Scare Don't Fear.

The new year would have the band on the road again continuing the support of their new record and they would tour with Mushroomhead, The Family Ruin and Thira.

This would be continued by another tour with The Animal in Me, The Things They Carried and Darkness Divided.

In May the band was able to land a slot on The Bud Light Rivercity Rockfest at the AT&T Centre in San Antonio, Texas with big-name acts such as Linkin Park, Papa Roach, Anthrax, Drowning Pool and more.

A music video was released for the band's cover of "Can't Feel My Face" by The Weeknd on August 31 and gave fans a chance to see their unique approach to a big hit single. The band went on tour early 2016 with Exotype and is expected to release the follow-up to Things We Think, But Never Speak sometime late 2016.

== Members ==
Current

- Ty Johnson – lead vocals (2012–present)
- Wade Concienne – clean vocals, guitar (2012–present)
- Alex Lofton – bass guitar, backing unclean vocals (2012–present)
- Nathan Richie – drums (2014–present)

Former

- Jacob Cardinal – drums (2012-2013)
- Chris Deckard – lead guitar, backing clean vocals (2012–2013)

== Discography ==
Like Monroe discography
- Studio albums: 1
- EPs: 1
- Singles: 6
- Music videos: 4

=== Studio albums ===
Year	Album details
2014	Things We Think, But Never Speak: Released: October 14, 2014; Label: Good Fight Music, eOne Music; Format: CD, Vinyl, Download

=== Singles ===
Year	Song	Album
2013	"The Enemy"	Single

=== Music videos ===
Year	Song	Album	Director	Type	Link
2016	"So Beautiful"	Things We Think, But Never Speak	Wade Concienne & Alex Lofton		
2014	"The Hills"	Things We Think, But Never Speak	Aaron Marsh		
2013	"The Enemy" (Single)	Single	Christopher Jon Puga	Lyric Video	
