= Hung Shih-ting =

Hung Shih-Ting
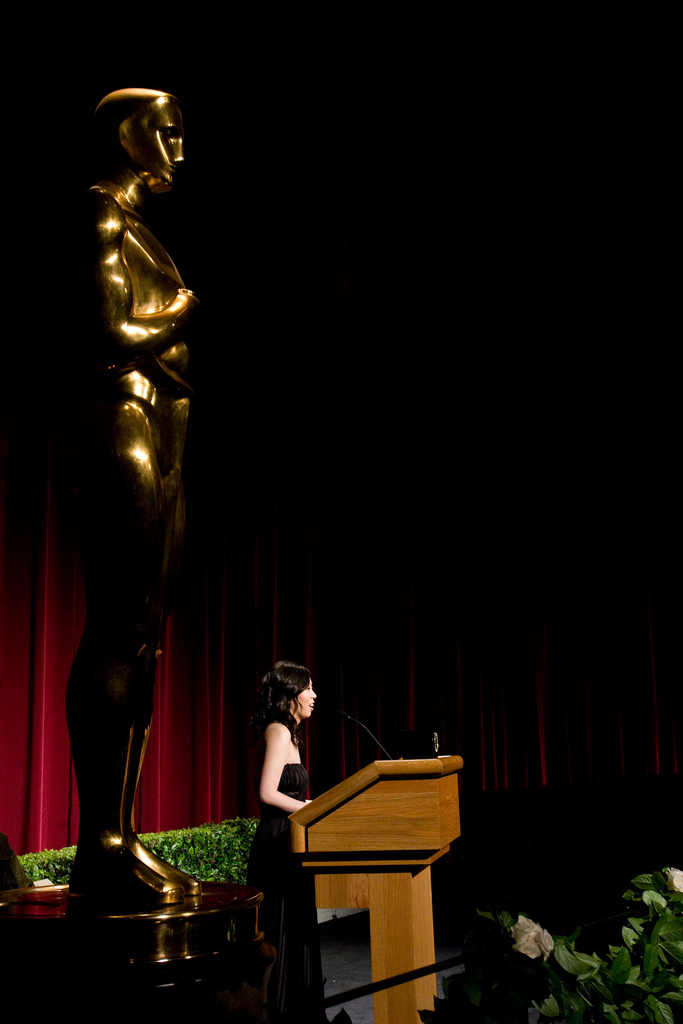
- Born: 洪詩婷; 25 May 1980 (age 45); Penghu, Taiwan
- Occupations: Film Director, Video Artist & Painter
- Awards: Student Academy Awards
- Website: https://www.shihtinghung.com

Hung Shih-Ting, often credited as "Shih-Ting Hung", is a film director, whose first feature film is in pre-production development as of 2022.

Her film, VIOLA : the Traveling Rooms of a Little Giant, earned her a Student Academy Award from Academy of Motion Picture Arts and Sciences in 2008. The film is now in permanent collection at the Academy Archive at AMPAS, Hollywood. Hung Shih-Ting now works globally as a commercial and music video director, she joined Ridley Scott Associates (RSA Films Asia) in 2009, while maintaining freelance status in most parts of the world.

== Early life ==
Hung Shih-Ting was born in Taipei, Taiwan and raised on an archipelago called Penghu. As a young child, she started painting at age four and piano lessons at five. Her first name "Shih" (pronounced as "she") means "poetry", while her surname "Hung", one of the 15th-most-common surname in Mandarin, means "flood",

As a teenager on an island of only 70,000 population, Hung Shih-Ting went through lonely school years and developed the love for Hollywood movies at the age of twelve. She regarded cinema as "a life saving, time space travel device" that worked wonder to her mind. Fantasy genre, above all, was her favorite. From one interview in 2020, Hung Shih-Ting spoke about recording audio from movie Jerry Maguire on TV to cassette tapes and listening to them hundreds of times repeatedly to practice English,

In 1999, Hung Shih-Ting then left hometown Penghu at age nineteen to Taipei, pursuing her Bachelor of Fine Arts degree at National Taiwan Normal University, which was considered the best fine art school at that time nationally. Influenced by her classmates and fellow musician friends, she then ventured out to independent music and world cinema,

== Career ==
Soon followed was her Hollywood dream, when she studied her Master of Fine Arts degree at the School of Cinema, University of Southern California in Los Angeles, USA. Majored in Animation, her thesis film, VIOLA : the Traveling Rooms of a Little Giant (2008), received a Student Academy Award in the Alternative Category and as well as the cover of the Academy Report. She was the first student in history at the USC Animation Department to receive such honor. The original print of the film is now at the Academy Archive at AMPAS, Hollywood.

Having experienced the landscape of the 2009 economic crisis as well as gender and race issues in the industry, Hung Shih-Ting has overcome much adversity to become as a commercial director. By persistently knocking on doors and not taking no for an answer, she continues to build her repertoire and filmmaking skills by leading productions in different countries with diverse culture. In 2019, Hung Shih-Ting went to Greece to shoot a short film about refugees, and also helming the regional productions (Greece/Germany) for the music video of the 2020 Tokyo Olympics theme song,

Hung Shih-Ting has also developed stronger voices to advocate for women’s rights. She has been speaking at United Nations NGO CSW 66 Forum, University of Southern California Symposium, Berlin Commercial Festival for Diversity Panel, and Shanghai International Film Festival, as well as many schools, colleges, and organizations.

== Films ==
- Franz (Post-Production) (2026)
- Vision Of Love (2024)
- VIOLA:The Traveling Rooms of a Little Giant (2008)

== Exhibitions ==
- 2023 | New Taipei City Art Museum (video installation)
- 2018 | Taipei Art District Festival (video installation)
- 2015 | Portrait of Brains : Shih-Ting Hung solo exhibition at Taipei Digital Art Center
- 2013 | Digital Print : The Face at Taipei Digital Art Center ( June 25 - Aug 25th, 2013)
- 2013 | Teresa Teng Exhibition, in memory of the legendary Chinese cultural icon, showcase Jan to April, 2013 on a 160inch x 40inch screen at Chiang Kai-shek Memorial Hall, Taiwan, Shanghai, and six major cities in Asia.
- 2010 | Museum of Contemporary Art Taipei [TAIPEI MOCA] (2009) : VIOLA:The Traveling Rooms of a Little Giant (2008) | Taipei Digital Award (video installation)
- 2010 | Singapore Art Museum (2010) : VIOLA:The Traveling Rooms of a Little Giant (2008) (video installation)
- 2010 | "YouTube Play" : collaboration between Solomon R. Guggenheim Museum & YouTube to showcase 125 video artists' works selected from more than 23,000 submissions in 91 countries.

== Awards ==
- 35th Student Academy Awards - "Gold Medal in Alternative category" / USA
- Kustendorf Film Festival - "Bronze Award" / Serbia
- Taipei Digital Art Award - nomination / Taiwan
- Fotokem Award - Bronze Award / USA
- Moondance Film Festival - Multi-Media Film - Spirit Award / USA
- 5th Singapore short Film Festival - "Voice Award" / Singapore
- 2008 Sidewalk Moving Picture Festival - Best Student Film / USA

== Music videos ==
Release	Artist(s)	Song	Album
Dec 2024	Penny Tai	"Silence"	
Nov 2024	Penny Tai	"Twin Flame" (Twin Videos "Blue" and "Red")	2025 Golden Melody Award Nomination for Best Female Mandarin Singer
July 2022	Penny Tai	"Farce"	2023 Golden Melody Award Nomination for Best Lyrics
July 2022	Penny Tai	"The Passive Audience"	2023 Golden Melody Award Nomination for Best Female Mandarin Singer
June 2022	Penny Tai	"Thanks To You"	
Sep 2021	Putad v.s. Small Island Big Song	"Pinasanga"	2022 Golden Melody Award Best Indigenous Album Nominee
Nov 2019	Yonezu Kenshi	"Paprika"	Tokyo Olympics 2020 Theme song (Greek and Germany segments)
Aug 2019	Wu Tsing-fong	"Space"	Spaceman (2019) (Universal Music Group)
July 2019	Of Monsters and Men	"Alligator"	Fever Dream (2019)
Jan 2015	Faith Yang	"Sunset"	
April 2014	Katie Herzig	"Walk Through Walls"	
Feb 2014	Katie Herzig	"Waking Sleep"	
Jan 2013	Teresa Teng	Legendary Chinese Singer : " Teresa Teng Classics - Section Hong Kong "	Teresa Teng Foundation
Dec 2012	Teresa Teng	Legendary Chinese Singer : " Teresa Teng Classics - Section Taiwan "	Teresa Teng Foundation
Nov 2012	Teresa Teng	Legendary Chinese Singer : " Teresa Teng Classics - Section Japan "	Teresa Teng Foundation
Sep 2011	Katie Herzig	"Free My Mind"	
Aug 2009	Mêlée	"Imitation"	(Warner Bros. Records)

=== Other credits ===
- United Airline: Heart (USA) (Compositor) - Annie Award winner (2008)
- The Willowz: Jubilee (Stop Motion Animator) (2008)
- Honda Element: Find New Roads (2D Animator) (2008)
- Norah Jones: Sinkin' Soon (Stop Motion Animator) (2007)
