= Walk Through Walls =

Studio album by Katie Herzig
- Released: April 8, 2014
- Recorded: St. Cecelia studios, Nashville (TN)
- Genre: Alternative, dream pop
- Label: Marion-Lorraine Records

Katie Herzig chronology
The Waking Sleep (2011)	Walk Through Walls (2014)

Walk Through Walls is the fifth studio album by the American singer-songwriter Katie Herzig. The album was recorded at her own St. Cecelia Studios in Nashville together with Cason Cooley. The album was mixed by Justin Gerrish and was self-released.

== Track listing ==
Album release
No.	Title	Length
1.	"Frequencies"	3:52
2.	"Drug"	3:03
3.	"Walk Through Walls"	4:24
4.	"Summer"	4:23
5.	"Say It Out Loud"	3:18
6.	"Your Side"	4:21
7.	"Lines"	3:25
8.	"Thick As Thieves"	4:18
9.	"Human Too"	3:16
10.	"Water Fear"	4:33
11.	"Forgiveness"	4:41
12.	"Proud"	4:25
