= Willow (Reflections album) =

Studio album by Reflections
- Released: February 20, 2020
- Genres: Progressive metalcore, deathcore, djent
- Length: 43:17

Reflections chronology
The Color Clear (2015)	Willow (2020)	Crystal Eyes (2026)

Professional ratings
Review scores
Source	Rating
Exclaim!	7/10
Metal Blast	8/10
Scream Blast Repeat	7/10

Willow is the fourth studio album by American progressive metalcore band Reflections. The album was released on February 20, 2020. This was the first and only album to feature Logan Young, who left the band a year after the album released, and the final album to feature Patrick Somoulay and Francis Xayana, who both left the band on January 26, 2026, having accused vocalist Jake Wolf of supporting ICE.

The album has many influences including Humanity's Last Breath's self-titled debut, Mick Gordon's soundtrack for Doom, ex-Periphery drummer Travis Orbin, Hate by Thy Art Is Murder, Danza III: The Series of Unfortunate Events by The Tony Danza Tapdance Extravaganza, Divided By by Structures, and the first two Slipknot albums.

== Track listing ==
No.	Title	Length
1.	"Synthetics"	2:43
2.	"From Nothing"	3:51
3.	"Psychosis"	3:05
4.	"Isolation"	3:44
5.	"Marionette"	3:39
6.	"Dismal"	3:47
7.	"Samsara"	4:24
8.	"Empathy"	3:09
9.	"Seven Stages"	4:28
10.	"Illusionist"	3:14
11.	"Help"	3:13
12.	"Ghost"	4:00
Total length:		43:17

== Personnel ==
- Jake Wolf – lead vocals, drums, guitars
- Patrick Somoulay – guitars
- Logan Young – guitars
- Francis Xayana – bass guitar

== Additional Personnel ==
- Chris George - Drums on Empathy and Seven Stage

== Production ==
- Jeff Key - Produced, Mixed, Mastered
