= The Weightless EP =

EP by Stillman
- Released: May 29, 2004
- Genre: Indie rock
- Length: 15:43
- Label: Self-release
- Producer: Chaz Craik

Stillman chronology
The Weightless EP (2004)	People Like a Happy Ending (2007)

The Weightless EP is the first release under the name Stillman by the singer-songwriter Chaz Craik.

== Recording ==
The EP was performed and recorded in Craik's home studio with the exception of the drums played by Ben Townsend at an unknown studio. Craik took the edited audio files to Propagation House, Holsworthy, Devon where he oversaw the mixing and mastering of the EP. Upon return to London he decided the mastering process had overly-flattened the music's dynamics and remastered the mixes himself.

== Cover art ==
The cover art was done by Craik himself and features an early version of what become the Stillman logo, namely the stick figure in the circle. Craik has said that it originally represented a magnifying glass focused on a person falling off the edge off the world, a theme from the lyrics of the title track. The image seemed to strike a chord with listeners of the album and it was variously interpreted as a man floating in a bubble or even grown in a petri dish. Craik adopted it as the logo and after this EP the hand-drawn version appears on the covers of all his subsequent releases in some form.

== Reception ==
The EP was chosen as single of the week by Planet Sound, at that time Channel 4 teletext's music zine. They said, "Very, very few singer-songwriter albums that get released induce so many shivers. It's as if Elliot Smith and Tom McRae got together to make the music they can't quite do on their own. Think that's hyperbole? Get a copy and prove us wrong."

It was given overwhelmingly positive reviews by a variety of webzines and fanzines. Losing Today said it was "able to conjure peaks of sublime melodic textures from thin air..to walk from this unaffected is to not love music at all", while The Beat Surrender wrote, "His vocals are magnificently rich, floating over the eclectic instrumentation..Magnificent stuff and hopefully its a taster for a full length effort further down the line." Diskant wrote that it "put me in mind of the cracked poetry of a post-Britpop Paul Simon, ‘The Weightless EP’ is a truly special record."

== Track listing ==
All tracks are written by Chaz Craik.

No.	Title	Length
1.	"Foreword"	1:17
2.	"Weightless"	5:01
3.	"The Worst Is Over"	4:16
4.	"Born For Show"	4:14
5.	"Afterword"	3:02
