= Creature (Within the Ruins album) =

Studio album by Within the Ruins
- Released: February 17, 2009
- Recorded: November 10, 2008 – January 2, 2009
- Studios: Zing Studios; Stadium Sound Recording Studio
- Genres: Metalcore; progressive metal
- Length: 38:06
- Label: Victory
- Producers: Eric Arena; Joe Cocchi

Within the Ruins chronology
Empires (2008)	Creature (2009)	Invade (2010)

Creature is the debut studio album by American metalcore band Within the Ruins. It was released on February 17, 2009, through Victory Records. It is their only studio album to feature Jon Grande on vocals. Additionally, it is their only studio album to feature Kyle Marcoux on guitar, and also Madison Roseberry on bass. The album features a distinctly different sound than the established sound the band would reveal on their sophomore release Invade.

The album saw the creation of the band's first music video, recorded for the song "Extinguish Them" and published to the band's YouTube channel on October 2, 2011.

== Background and recording ==
Creature was recorded between November 10, 2008 and January 2, 2009, at Zing Recording Studios in Within the Ruins' hometown of Westfield, Massachusetts. Zing had previously produced highly acclaimed metalcore albums by renowned metal bands such as Unearth's The Oncoming Storm, August Burns Red's debut Thrill Seeker, several Killswitch Engage albums, and Shadows Fall's Somber Eyes to the Sky. The band would return to Zing to engineer the vocals on their 2017 release Halfway Human.

== Critical reception ==
Creature was ranked 53rd by Metal Injection readers in the blog's end-of-year "Best Albums of 2009" poll.

== Track listing ==
No.	Title	Length
1.	"The Book of Books"	3:58
2.	"Arsenal"	3:50
3.	"Dig a Ditch"	4:22
4.	"Call Off the Wedding"	3:38
5.	"Extinguish Them"	3:56
6.	"Jump Ship" (instrumental)	2:53
7.	"Creature"	3:31
8.	"Tractor Pull"	4:56
9.	"Holy Mess"	4:36
10.	"Victory" (instrumental)	2:26
Total length:		38:06

== Personnel ==
Within the Ruins

- Jon Grande – vocals
- Joe Cocchi – lead guitar
- Kyle Marcoux – rhythm guitar
- Madison Roseberry – bass
- Kevin McGuill – drums

Additional personnel

- Joe Cocchi – production
- Eric Arena – production, engineering, mixing
- Jim Fogarty – engineering, piano
- Jay Deluca and Maria Rice – engineering
- Jeff Lipton – remastering
- Godmachine – design, artwork
- Doublej – layout
- Jeremy Saffer – photography
