= Watch Them Fall =

2004 studio album by Katie Herzig

Studio album by Katie Herzig
- Released: 2004
- Genre: Folk, indie pop

Katie Herzig chronology
Watch Them Fall (2004)	Weightless (2006)

Watch Them Fall is the debut album by the American singer-songwriter Katie Herzig, released in 2004. The song "Watch Them Fall" was featured in the TV series Smallville and "Say Goodbye" appeared on the film X's & O's.

== Track list ==
Album release
No.	Title	Length
1.	"Say Goodbye"	2:52
2.	"Chase Me"	3:28
3.	"Over And Over"	3:28
4.	"Wonderful World"	4:05
5.	"Tell Me Something"	3:29
6.	"Take It Back"	4:05
7.	"Maybe"	1:44
8.	"Angels On The Banks"	4:22
9.	"Hungry Still"	4:43
10.	"Watch Them Fall"	4:19
11.	"Make It Through"	3:59
