= Invade (Within the Ruins album) =

Studio album by Within the Ruins
- Released: August 31, 2010
- Genres: Progressive metal; metalcore; mathcore
- Length: 40:59
- Label: Victory
- Producers: Josh Wickman; Within the Ruins

Within the Ruins chronology
Creature (2009)	Invade (2010)	Omen (2011)

Invade is the second studio album by American metalcore band Within the Ruins. It is the first release to feature Tim Goergen on vocals, and Jay Van Schelt on guitars. The album sold 2,000 copies in its first week and 650 in its second.

== Composition ==
Invade is the first Within the Ruins album to feature a song from the "Ataxia" instrumental series. Newer installments of the song would appear on most of the band's subsequent studio albums ever since. Speaking on "Ataxia" in a 2013 interview with music news site MindEqualsBlown, guitarist Joe Cocchi stated:

"It was one of the first demos that I had. As soon as I started writing it, I knew it wasn't going to be a song that we would necessarily perform live with [vocalist] Tim [Goergen] or add vocals to. It's just a totally different vibe and a different feel. It's going to be instrumental and a little more over the top and all over the place, which makes it really hard to write vocals to and to play the thing live with me being the only guitar player right now."

== Promotion and release ==
Vocalist Tim Goergen and guitarist Joe Cocchi interviewed with metal blog MetalSucks on August 11, 2010, to discuss the new album. Goergen noted the album was "heavier" sounding, with more "intense" lyrical themes, and more "structured" than Creature. Overall, he stated that Invade had a "crisper, bigger production".

Speaking on the lyrics, Goergen stated:

"I tried to write from more of a personal perspective. I was homeless for a while, and I had some drinking issues, so I put my personal experiences in there. I also tried to put in a positive tone so people who are listening can understand and maybe the songs can help them out."

Goergen noted that only two of the songs on the album were written before he and Van Schelt joined the band. On the writing process for the album, Goergen noted:

"Normally we start with a riff from Joe, and then we add drums sometimes with a machine, then I start writing lyrics, then we all start jamming on the song. It took us about one year to make so we could make sure it sounded the way we wanted it to sound. Actually, we're already writing a new record (laughs)."

On July 23, 2010, the band posted the song "Invade" to their Myspace. The song "Versus" was premiered at metal blog MetalSucks on August 19, 2010.

Three music videos were released in support of the album – one live, and two studio. A live video for the song "Red Flagged" was released on December 14, 2010. On April 25, 2011, a studio music video was released for the song "Versus".

Providing background on the video, which was filmed on January 29, 2011, the band stated:

"The performance aspect of the video will be shot at the Waterfront Tavern in Holyoke MA, Saturday, January 29th. Interlaced with the live footage will be a storyline that follows a young man struggling to cope with the reality that we live in and questioning his religious upbringing. After numerous tragedies occur in his life, the young man chooses to follow his own path forsaking all organized religion and choosing to think for himself rather than fall victim to the fear mongering that is involved in all organized religion."

A second studio video, this for the song "Invade", was published to the band's YouTube channel on October 2, 2011.

== Critical reception ==
Professional ratings
Review scores
Source	Rating
HeavyBlogIsHeavy	3/5
Sputnikmusic	3.0/5

Invade was ranked 39th in Metal Injection's 2010 end-of-year "Best Albums of 2010" reader poll. The album received 13 votes, which tied it with Carnifex's Hell Chose Me, Cynic's Re-Traced, and others.

HeavyBlogIsHeavy reviewer Jimmy Rowe gave the album 3/5, praising the "epic leads, tech riffs, and solos" on songs like "Ataxia" and "Invade". Though favoring the album's technicality, he believed they relied too heavily on deathcore tropes. He writes:

"There are some rather brilliant moments throughout Invade, but in the grand scheme of things, they seem to be pretty minuscule when breakdowns are thrown in without a second's thought. These guys can definitely bring the riffs and shred, and while no doubt talented, they don't use this to their full advantage. Don't hide behind the veil of prog when you throw in a couple of new riffs and leads between breakdowns. I give the band a hard time, but they are a cut above the average and I want to see them succeed. A better grip on songwriting would be beneficial. Invade isn't bad at all. In fact, it's actually a solid listen, but these guys are capable of more than 'solid'."

== Track listing ==
No.	Title	Length
1.	"Designing Oblivion" (instrumental)	0:34
2.	"Versus"	3:54
3.	"Behold the Harlot"	3:37
4.	"Red Flagged"	3:58
5.	"Invade"	3:58
6.	"Ataxia" (instrumental)	3:46
7.	"Cross Buster"	3:36
8.	"Feast or Famine"	3:50
9.	"Oath" (featuring Nate Johnson of Fit for an Autopsy)	3:49
10.	"The Carouser"	3:33
11.	"Roads" (instrumental)	6:24
Total length:		40:59

== Personnel ==
Within the Ruins

- Tim Goergen – vocals
- Joe Cocchi – lead guitar
- Jay Van Schelt – rhythm guitar
- Mike Beaujean – bass
- Kevin McGuill – drums

Additional musicians

- Nate Johnson – guest vocals on "Oath"

Additional personnel

- Within the Ruins – production, art direction
- Josh Wickman – production, engineering, mixing, mastering
- Ryan Moge – engineering
- Derek Guidry – illustrations
- Doublej – layout

== Charts ==
Chart (2010)	Peak position
US Independent Albums (Billboard)	46
US Heatseekers Albums (Billboard)	9
