= Weightless (Katie Herzig album) =

Studio album by Katie Herzig
- Released: January 31, 2006
- Genre: Folk, Indie
- Length: 50:26
- Label: Marion-Lorraine Records
- Producer: Katie Herzig

Katie Herzig chronology
Watch Them Fall (2004)	Weightless (2006)	Apple Tree (2008)

Weightless is the second studio album by the American singer-songwriter Katie Herzig, which was released in 2006.

== Track listing ==
Album release
No.	Title	Length
1.	"Jack and Jill"	2:45
2.	"Sweeter Than This"	2:43
3.	"Until You Try"	4:17
4.	"Crazy"	4:01
5.	"Fool's Gold"	2:48
6.	"The Offer"	3:26
7.	"Charlie Chaplin"	2:41
8.	"Butterfly"	3:36
9.	"Not Even Close"	4:34
10.	"Weightless"	3:19
11.	"Jenny Lynn"	4:28
12.	"Diamond Ring"	3:50
13.	"Child I Can See Ya"	5:21
14.	"Middle"	2:30
