= Within the Ruins =

American metalcore band

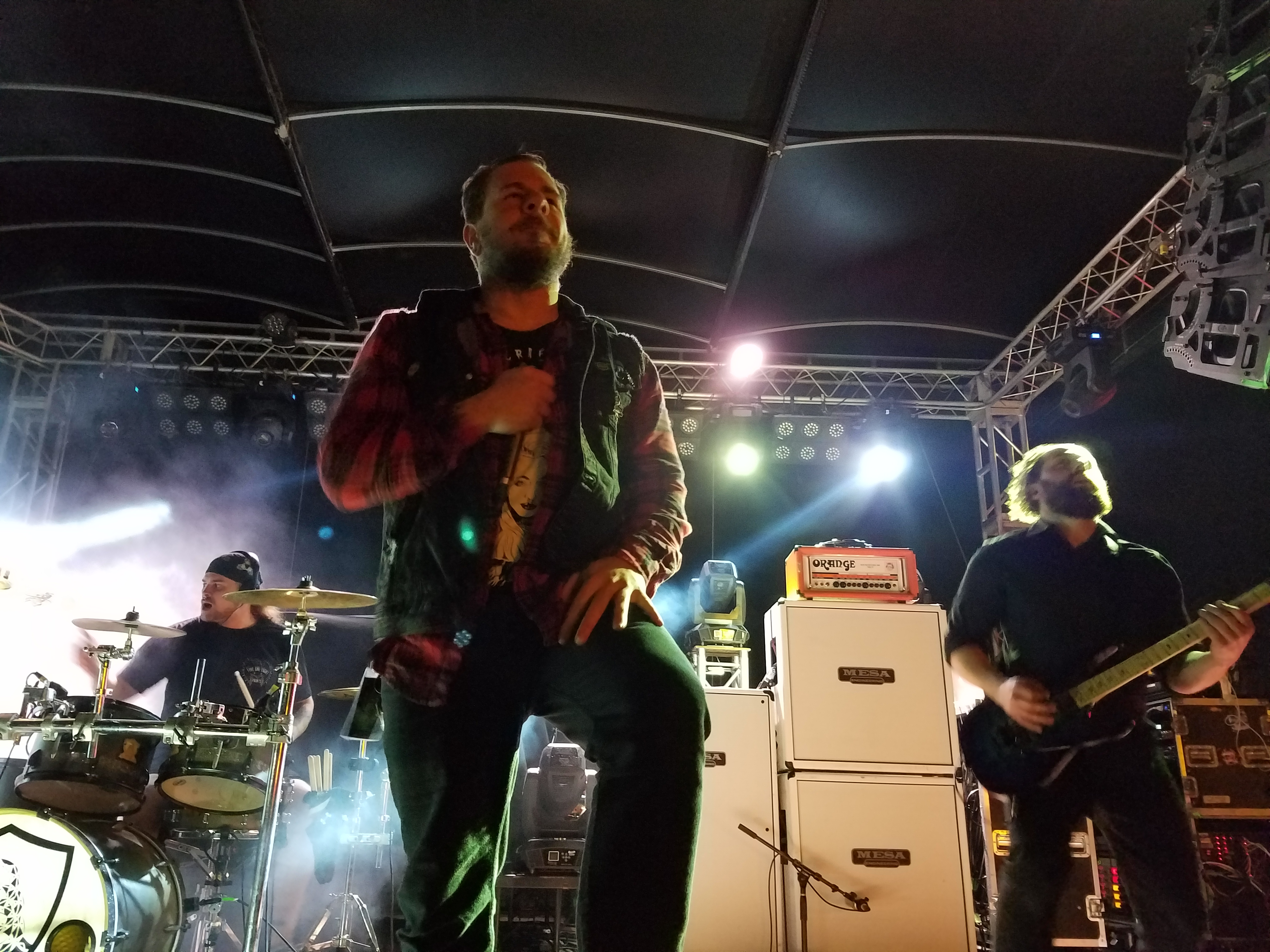
- Within the Ruins in 2017

Background information
- Origin: Westfield, Massachusetts, U.S.
- Genres: Metalcore; deathcore; progressive metal; melodic death metal; djent; mathcore
- Years active: 2003–present
- Labels: eOne Music; Good Fight Music; Victory; Innerstrength
- Members: Joe Cocchi; Kevin McGuill; Paolo Galang; Steve Tinnon
- Past members: Rafael Gonzalez; Chris Strong; Arthur Pero; Jon Grande; Madison Roseberry; Kyle Marcoux; Mike Beaujean; Jay Van Schelt; Andrew Tate; Tim Goergen

Within the Ruins is an American metalcore band formed in Westfield, Massachusetts, in 2003. The group currently consists of guitarist Joe Cocchi, drummer Kevin McGuill, bassist Paolo Galang, and vocalist Steve Tinnon. They are currently signed to eOne Music and Good Fight Music. The band has released seven studio albums and three EPs.

The band employs very little clean singing. Lead vocalist Steve Tinnon is considered to be "the focal point" of the band, with clean vocals provided by bassist Paolo Galang being used "predominantly as backup".

== History ==
Within the Ruins founding members Joe Cocchi and Kevin McGuill started the band during 2003.

The band went through some line-up changes and finally began working on their first self-released EP entitled Driven by Fear which was completed in 2005.

Followed by the release, the band began touring in late 2006 in an effort to gain exposure and label recognition. With the release of their second EP Empires through Innerstrength Records the band received an offer from Victory Records.

The band's debut studio album Creature was released in February 2009, followed by their second studio album entitled Invade in August 2010. Invade sold over 3,000 copies in its first week.

The band has most recently toured Europe with Carnifex and has been part of a number of 2011-12 festivals thus far including the Bonecrusher Fest, the Jamboree, New England Metal and Hardcore Festival, the Bamboozle, South by Southwest and 2011's the Summer Slaughter Tour.

In support of the Summer Slaughter Tour the band released a 4-song EP entitled Omen. The EP consists of 2 new original songs and a cover of Metallica's "Fight Fire with Fire" and Kansas' "Carry On Wayward Son".

In 2013 the band signed with new label eOne Entertainment and released the third studio album called Elite.

On April 20, 2014, vocalist Tim Goergen was hospitalized in the band's hometown of Westfield, Massachusetts, with "heart/liver complications". As a result, the band was forced to miss a scheduled appearance at the "Eat Your Heart Out Fest" in Poughkeepsie, New York, while touring in support of fellow deathcore mainstays Whitechapel.

The band released an official statement on the occurrence via their Facebook page:

Yesterday morning Tim checked into a hospital here in Western Mass for a second time since our tour began four days ago. We will unfortunately not be performing at today's Eat Your Heart Out Fest, as we are waiting for clarity on Tim's condition and release. Tim informed us a few weeks before leaving for tour that he was experiencing chest and stomach pains. After his first doctor visit he was advised to "take it easy" if he did do the tour. At this point all we know is that he is experiencing heart/liver complications, will not be released today, but is stable.

Tim's recovery necessitated the band canceling the rest of their scheduled tour dates. On their Facebook page, the band released an official statement:

Unfortunately, at this point we have no other option but to withdraw from the remaining dates of the Whitechapel tour. Tim will be released tomorrow, but due to the seriousness of his condition he has been advised not to engage in any strenuous activity while recovering over the next few weeks. We apologize to any fans that were looking forward to seeing us, but Tim’s health comes first. We WILL be back out this summer in support of our forthcoming album. The rest of the shows are still happening so be sure to make it out and support our friends in Whitechapel, Carnifex and Cruel Hand. See you all this summer!

On July 8, the band released their fourth studio album entitled Phenomena, which reached #72 on the Billboard 200.

On February 15, 2015, while traveling through Pennsylvania in support of Suicide Silence on "The Stronger Than Faith", the band were involved in a serious bus accident. Extreme winter conditions resulted in the band's van and trailer flipping several times on the interstate. None of the band members were injured, however their gear was completely destroyed.

Speaking on the incident, Joe Cocchi stated:

We rolled about three times from what I can remember and landed on the median. Our van and trailer are totaled. All I can say is that we're happy to be alive. I don't know how, but none of us were injured. We're on the road touring because this is all we know and love, and we want to continue. Help us get back on our feet by picking up a shirt. Thank you all for the continued support.

The band created a GoFundMe page in order to help pay for the damages to their equipment.

On November 21, 2016, Within the Ruins announced their fifth studio album, Halfway Human, and debuted a single, "Death of the Rockstar". On March 3, 2017, the band released Halfway Human. The album debuted at number 191 on the Billboard 200, selling 4,025 copies in its first week.

On February 24, 2018, it was announced vocalist Tim Goergen would be leaving the band following his final performance with the band at the 2018 New England Metal and Hardcore Festival on April 21. His replacement would be Steve Tinnon. On July 27, the band released two new singles, their first with Tinnon, "Resurgence" and "World Undone".

On September 24, 2020, the band announced that their sixth studio album, Black Heart, would be released on November 27.

On June 26, 2024, the band released a single titled "Castle in the Sky" and announced that their seventh studio album, Phenomena II would be released on August 23, 2024.

== Band members ==
Current

- Joe Cocchi – guitars (2003–present)
- Kevin McGuill – drums (2003–present)
- Paolo Galang – bass, clean vocals (2016–present)
- Steve Tinnon – lead vocals (2018–present)

Former

- Rafael Gonzalez – unclean vocals (2003–2006)
- Arthur Pero – bass (2005-2006)
- Chris Strong – bass (2006–2008)
- Jon Grande – unclean vocals (2007–2009)
- Madison Roseberry – bass (2008–2009)
- Kyle Marcoux – guitars (2003–2010)
- Mike Beaujean – bass (2009–2011)
- Jay Van Schelt – guitars (2010–2011)
- Andrew Tate – bass (2011–2015)
- Tim Goergen – lead vocals (2016–2018); unclean vocals (2009–2016)

== Discography ==
Within the Ruins discography
- Studio albums: 7
- Extended plays: 3

=== Studio albums ===
List of studio albums, with selected chart positions
Title	Album details	Peak chart positions				
Title	Album details	US	US Heat.	US Indie.	US Rock	US Hard Rock
Creature	Released: February 17, 2009; Label: Victory	—	—	—	—	—
Invade	Released: August 31, 2010; Label: Victory	—	9	46	—	—
Elite	Released: February 26, 2013; Label: eOne Music, Good Fight Music	133	2	23	35	5
Phenomena	Released: July 22, 2014; Label: eOne Music, Good Fight Music	72	—	15	25	11
Halfway Human	Released: March 3, 2017; Label: eOne Music, Good Fight Music	191	—	11	38	9
Black Heart	Released: November 27, 2020; Label: eOne Music, Good Fight Music	—	—	—	—	—
Phenomena II	Released: August 23, 2024; Label: MNRK	—	—	—	—	—
"—" denotes a recording that did not chart

=== EPs ===
List of extended plays
Title	EP details
Driven by Fear	Released: September 11, 2006; Label: Innerstrength
Empires	Released: July 10, 2008; Label: Innerstrength
Omen	Released: May 24, 2011; Label: Victory
