= Good Fight Entertainment =

Business conglomerate

Good Fight Entertainment is a business conglomerate that was founded in 2010. The company consists of a record label, band management, sports management, a clothing line and an art studio. Good Fight was founded by Paul Conroy and Carl Severson who have previously worked for Ferret Music and Warner Music Group. Carl Severson is also known as a longtime member of hardcore act NORA.

== Good Fight Music ==
Good Fight Music
- Founded: 2010
- Founder: Carl Severson
- Distributors: INgrooves, ADA, RED
- Genre: Hardcore punk, metalcore, heavy metal, punk rock
- Country of origin: United States
- Official website: goodfightmusic.com

Good Fight Music is the independent record label department of Good Fight Entertainment which features hardcore punk and heavy metal bands. The first albums released through Good Fight Music were Bears, Mayors, Scraps & Bones by Cancer Bats and The Farthest Reaches by Son of Aurelius which were released on April 13, 2010. In November 2010, Good Fight acquired the rights to release seven of In Flames' earlier albums in the United States.

=== Bands ===
Current artists

- Assassins
- Auras
- The Banner
- Chokehold
- Conditions
- The Contortionist
- Cryptodira
- Dark Sermon
- Disembodied
- End
- Enterprise Earth
- Extinction A. D.
- Great American Ghost
- Harvest
- Hollow Earth
- In Flames (Classic catalog, North America only)
- Ion Dissonance
- Legion
- Like Monroe
- MyChildren MyBride
- Nasty
- Nora
- Pyralis
- Racetraitor
- Rarity
- Skyharbor
- Son of Aurelius
- SOS
- Winds of Plague
- Within the Ruins
- '68
- Through the Eyes of the Dead
- Vile Ones
- Yashira

Former artists

- Cancer Bats
- The Chariot
- Fit for an Autopsy
- Funeral for a Friend
- I Am Abomination
- No Bragging Rights
- Reflections
- Rosaline
- Terror
- This or the Apocalypse
- Trapped Under Ice
- While She Sleeps

== Good Fight Sports athletes ==
- Tom Asta
- Chris Cole
- Alyonka Larionov
- Alec Martinez
- James van Riemsdyk
- Dakota Roche
- Mike Vallely
