= UK techno =

Techno music and scenes in the United Kingdom

UK techno is the techno music made and played in the United Kingdom, and the club, rave and free party culture around it. Detroit techno reached Britain in the late 1980s alongside Chicago house and acid house, and from the early 1990s British DJs, producers, clubs and sound systems developed their own approaches to it, from the "intelligent" listening techno associated with Warp to the hard, loop-based sound of Birmingham and the acid techno of London's squat parties. Scotland, and particularly Glasgow and Edinburgh, developed one of the most devoted techno audiences in Europe, and Belfast's club scene became a meeting point for young people across Northern Ireland's sectarian divide.

Many of the first generation of British techno artists came to the music through earlier subcultures: electro, hip hop and breakdancing, and the post-punk, goth, industrial and gay club scenes of the 1980s.

== History ==
=== House, acid house and the arrival of Detroit ===
In the UK, a club following for house music grew steadily from 1985, with interest sustained by scenes in London, Manchester, Nottingham, and later Sheffield and Leeds. The DJs thought to be responsible for house's early UK success include Mike Pickering, Mark Moore, Colin Faver, and Graeme Park (DJ).

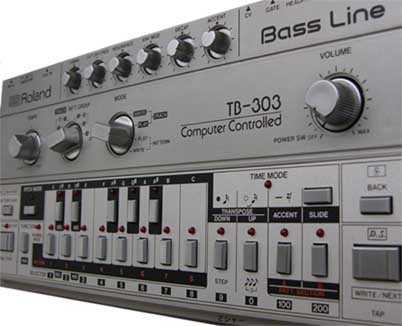
Roland TB-303: The bass line synthesizer that was used prominently in acid house.

By 1988, house music had exploded in the UK, and acid house was increasingly popular. There was also a long-established warehouse party subculture based around the sound system and rare groove scene. By 1988 house had already become part of the mix at these parties. That same year, the Balearic party vibe associated with Ibiza-based DJ Alfredo Fiorito was transported to London, when Danny Rampling and Paul Oakenfold opened the clubs Shoom and Spectrum, respectively. Both night spots quickly became synonymous with acid house, and it was during this period that the use of MDMA, as a party drug, started to gain prominence. Other important UK clubs at this time included Jive Turkey in Sheffield, and in Manchester The Haçienda, where Mike Pickering and Graeme Park's Friday night spot, Nude, was an important proving ground for American underground dance music. Acid house party fever escalated in London and Manchester, and it quickly became a cultural phenomenon. MDMA-fueled club goers, faced with 2AM closing hours, sought refuge in the warehouse party scene that ran all night. To escape the attention of the press and the authorities, this after-hours activity quickly went underground. Within a year, however, up to 10,000 people at a time were attending the first commercially organized mass parties, called "raves", and a media storm ensued.

The success of house and acid house paved the way for wider acceptance of the Detroit sound, and vice versa: techno was initially supported by a handful of house music clubs in Chicago, New York, and Northern England, with London clubs catching up later; but in 1987, it was "Strings of Life" which eased London club-goers into acceptance of house, according to DJ Mark Moore.

=== Electro, b-boys, goths and gay clubs ===
Electro and hip hop were the first electronic dance music for many British techno producers. Ed Handley and Andy Turner, later of The Black Dog and Plaid, bonded as teenage b-boys in a village outside Ipswich, and have described themselves as ex-breakdancers; the DJ and producer Ben Sims described many of the early London techno producers as "hip hop kids who discovered acid house". In Manchester, Gerald Simpson (A Guy Called Gerald) was a b-boy from 1982–83, danced to jazz-funk and electro-funk, and battled other DJ crews as a member of the Scratch Beatmasters before making "Voodoo Ray" (1988). Dave Clarke began DJing hip hop and disco at a Brighton roller disco, and was sacked for playing acid house; he has said that growing up on hip hop made breakbeats and swing central to his techno.

Others came from goth, industrial and gay club culture. Luke Slater became a resident in 1988–89 at Troll, a mixed gay night at the Soundshaft, the small room attached to the London club Heaven, after handing the booker a mixtape. Troll's residents also included Daz Saund, who went on to play at Trade, London's first legal after-hours club, when it opened in 1990. The London duo Greater Than One (Lee Newman and Michael Wells) moved from experimental industrial records on Wax Trax! to techno and rave as GTO and Tricky Disco, whose "Tricky Disco" reached number 14 in the UK in 1990. In Edinburgh, Keith McIvor (JD Twitch) began DJing at a night known locally as a goth club (though none of its DJs were goths) playing bands such as Big Black and the Butthole Surfers, before switching it to acid house; his later nights combined house and techno with new beat, EBM, On-U Sound and dub.

The Detroit sound also found an early home with black British DJs. Grooverider, who with Fabio later became central to jungle and drum and bass, recalled that the vocal-free dub mixes of Detroit records were "right up my street".

=== Techno clubs and parties ===
In the United Kingdom, Sub Club which opened in Glasgow in 1987, and Trade which opened its doors to Londoners in 1990, were venues which helped bring techno into the country. Trade has been referred to as the 'original all night bender'.

In London, the Kiss FM DJs Colin Faver and Colin Dale championed techno on radio, and in 1992 co-founded the club Knowledge at SW1, near Victoria, known for tougher techno and international guests. Steve Bicknell's warehouse parties Lost, which began in 1991, had a purist focus and a strong link with Jeff Mills, and paired British producers such as Luke Slater and Plaid with American and European artists including Mills and Basic Channel. Ben Sims described Lost as a meeting point for UK producers.

=== Intelligent techno ===
In 1991 UK music journalist Matthew Collin wrote that "Europe may have the scene and the energy, but it's America which supplies the ideological direction...if Belgian techno gives us riffs, German techno the noise, British techno the breakbeats, then Detroit supplies the sheer cerebral depth." By 1992 a number of European producers and labels began to associate rave culture with the corruption and commercialization of the original techno ideal. Following this the notion of an intelligent or Detroit inspired pure techno aesthetic began to take hold. Detroit techno had maintained its integrity throughout the rave era and was pushing a new generation of so-called intelligent techno producers forward. Simon Reynolds suggests that this progression "involved a full-scale retreat from the most radically posthuman and hedonistically functional aspects of rave music toward more traditional ideas about creativity, namely the auteur theory of the solitary genius who humanizes technology."

The term intelligent techno was used to differentiate more sophisticated versions of underground techno from rave-oriented styles such as breakbeat hardcore, Schranz, Dutch Gabber. Warp Records was among the first to capitalize upon this development with the release of the compilation album Artificial Intelligence Of this time, Warp founder and managing director Steve Beckett said

the dance scene was changing and we were hearing B-sides that weren't dance but were interesting and fitted into experimental, progressive rock, so we decided to make the compilation Artificial Intelligence, which became a milestone ... it felt like we were leading the market rather than it leading us, the music was aimed at home listening rather than clubs and dance floors: people coming home, off their nuts and having the most interesting part of the night listening to totally tripped out music. The sound fed the scene.

Warp had originally marketed Artificial Intelligence using the description electronic listening music but this was quickly replaced by intelligent techno. In the same period (1992–93) other names were also bandied about such as armchair techno, ambient techno, and electronica, but all referred to an emerging form of post-rave dance music for the "sedentary and stay at home". Following the commercial success of the compilation in the United States, Intelligent Dance Music eventually became the name most commonly used for much of the experimental dance music emerging during the mid-to-late 1990s.

Although it is primarily Warp that has been credited with ushering the commercial growth of IDM and electronica, in the early 1990s there were many notable labels associated with the initial intelligence trend that received little, if any, wider attention. Amongst others they include: Black Dog Productions (1989), Carl Craig's Planet E (1991), Kirk Degiorgio's Applied Rhythmic Technology (1991), Eevo Lute Muzique (1991), Rephlex Records (1991), and General Production Recordings (1991). In 1993, a number of new "intelligent techno"/"electronica" record labels emerged, including New Electronica, Mille Plateaux, 100% Pure (1993) and Ferox Records (1993).

=== London producers and labels ===
In London, the self-distributed debut Virtual by the Black Dog (Ken Downie, Ed Handley and Andy Turner) is widely credited with shaping a new, abstract form of techno. Kirk Degiorgio, who worked at Reckless Records in Soho and met Derrick May at an Inner City gig in 1989, founded the label Applied Rhythmic Technology (A.R.T.); Carl Craig's Planet E licensed one of its EPs. Steve Rutter and Mike Golding's B12 were inspired by Derrick May's "It Is What It Is" to make a British equivalent, and were often mistaken for a Detroit label. The Fat Cat record shop, which opened in Crawley in 1989 and moved to Covent Garden the following year, became a hub for collectors, and labels such as Peacefrog (home of Stasis) and Baby Ford's Ifach developed the scene, while Luke Slater recorded as The 7th Plain for General Production Recordings. Dave Clarke's Red series of singles in the mid-1990s are regarded as groundbreaking productions. In the mid-1990s the rise of drum and bass split the scene, and by 1997 records such as Plaid's Not for Threes and Baby Ford's Headphoneasy Rider pointed towards album-based electronica and minimal production respectively.

=== Free parties and sound systems ===
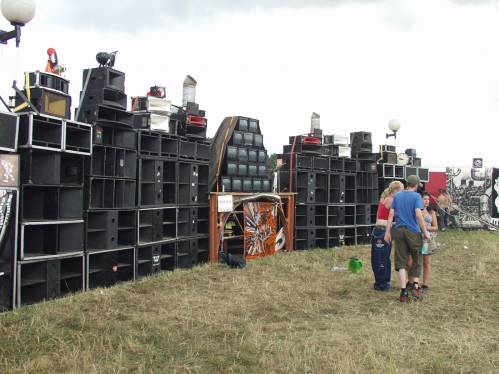
A sound system at Czechtek 2004

In the early 1990s a post-rave, DIY, free party scene had established itself in the UK. It was largely based around an alliance between warehouse party goers from various urban squat scenes and politically inspired new age travellers. The new agers offered a readymade network of countryside festivals that were hastily adopted by squatters and ravers alike. Prominent among the sound systems operating at this time were Exodus in Luton, Tonka in Brighton, Smokescreen in Sheffield, DiY in Nottingham, Bedlam, Circus Warp, LSDiesel and London's Spiral Tribe. The high point of this free party period came in May 1992 when with less than 24 hours notice and little publicity more than 35,000 gathered at the Castlemorton Common Festival for 5 days of partying.

The Criminal Justice and Public Order Act 1994, prompted in large part by Castlemorton, led many of the travelling sound systems to leave Britain; their parties in continental Europe helped spread the free party and teknival model there.

Musically, the free party systems differed widely. Spiral Tribe have been described as "'90s Britain's hardest hardcore techno crew", playing techno and hardcore for free; DiY in Nottingham was primarily a house sound system. Bedlam, founded in east London, kept a deliberately low profile and avoided Spiral Tribe's politics; its DJ Murf later held a long residency at Sub-terrain, the flagship night at the London club The End, alongside Mr. C. Other crews were strictly techno: the Midlands system BWPT would boo DJs off for playing house records, and Virus, run by former Spiral Tribe members, played Cologne acid and Chicago-style tracks in the vein of Robert Armani.

=== Squat parties and acid techno ===
After the Criminal Justice Act, the free party ethos survived in London's squat party scene, which used derelict buildings left by deindustrialisation. Its characteristic sound was acid techno, defined by the Roland TB-303 and influenced by Jeff Mills, Underground Resistance and Belgian new beat. The Liberator DJs (Chris, Aaron and Julian), who came from the squat punk scene and threw their first party in a squat in north London in 1991, launched the Stay Up Forever label in 1993–94; it grew into a collective of labels that released thousands of tracks. Other crews on the "crustier end" of London rave included the Tribal Energy squat parties.

=== Mid-1990s and Birmingham ===
With an increasing diversification (and commercialization) of dance music, the collectivist sentiment prominent in the early rave scene diminished, each new faction having its own particular attitude and vision of how dance music (or in certain cases, non-dance music) should evolve. According to Muzik magazine, by 1995 the UK techno scene was in decline and dedicated club nights were dwindling. The music had become "too hard, too fast, too male, too drug-oriented, too anally retentive." Despite this, weekly nights at clubs such as Final Frontier (London), The Orbit (Leeds), House of God (Birmingham), Pure (Edinburgh, whose resident DJ Twitch later founded the more eclectic Optimo), and Bugged Out (Manchester) were still popular. With techno reaching a state of "creative palsy," and with a disproportionate number of underground dance music enthusiasts more interested in the sounds of rave and jungle, in 1995 the future of the UK techno scene looked uncertain as the market for "pure techno" waned. Muzik described the sound of UK techno at this time as "dutiful grovelling at the altar of American techno with a total unwillingness to compromise."

In Birmingham, Anthony Child (Surgeon) became a resident at the club night House of God in the mid-1990s; with Regis and others he developed the stripped, abrasive "Birmingham sound", which influenced German DJs including Chris Liebing.

== Scotland ==
Glasgow's industrial decline and high unemployment in the late 1980s, and its blue-collar culture of working and partying hard, have been credited with shaping its club scene. The duo Slam (Stuart McMillan and Orde Meikle) started their night at Tin Pan Alley in 1988, brought Derrick May to the Sub Club in 1989, and took up residencies there, including the Saturday night Atlantis with Harri. Extended 5 am licences granted during Glasgow's year as European City of Culture in 1990 gave the scene a further boost. In 1991 Slam co-founded Soma Quality Recordings, which released Slam's "Positive Education" (1993) and, in 1995, Daft Punk's "Da Funk"; Slam's monthly night Pressure later moved to The Arches, where they had first played in 1992.

Glasgow also had a rougher, more underground techno scene. Pussypower, run by the brothers Jason and Terry Power, was described by Soma's Dave Clarke as "a couple of crusty techno DJs with Castlemilk connections", and held a one-off event at The Arches before Slam's club began there. Pussypower's parties included raves on a chartered ferry, and the crew remained active in Glasgow's acid house and techno underground for more than 25 years, at a time when Glasgow's licensing curfew and the Criminal Justice Bill brought heavy restrictions on unlicensed events.

In Edinburgh, McIvor (JD Twitch) and Andrew Watson (DJ Brainstorm) founded Pure in 1990 after police closed their earlier night UFO. Running at The Venue until 1997, Pure played a wide range of hard, funky music from UK breakbeats to Dutch hardcore to a mixed crowd of students, bikers, football fans and ravers, and hosted the UK debuts of Richie Hawtin and Jeff Mills. The heavier, acid-focused Sativa, closer to the free party scene, began in Edinburgh in 1991 and ran its own label from 1994. In 1997 McIvor and Belfast-born Jonnie Wilkes launched Optimo at the Sub Club, a Sunday night whose genre-crossing policy McIvor described as a reaction against techno becoming "very masculine"; it ran weekly until 2010. McIvor died in September 2025.

== Northern Ireland ==
In Belfast, David Holmes and Iain McCready's Sugar Sweet nights at the Art College in the early 1990s introduced techno to a generation of young people, and were widely credited with bringing people together across the city's sectarian divisions; Orbital named their track "Belfast" after playing there. The producer Phil Kieran recalled Sugar Sweet as his first experience of a proper techno night. Shine, founded in 1995 by Alan Simms, began with US house but became best known as a techno club, hosting artists including Richie Hawtin, Dave Clarke and Slam, with Kieran as a long-time resident.

== See also ==
- Techno
- Birmingham sound
- Bleep techno
- Free party
- Acid techno

== Bibliography ==
- Brewster, B.; Broughton, F. (2006). Last Night a DJ Saved My Life: The History of the Disc Jockey. Avalon Travel Publishing. ISBN 978-0802136886.
- Cosgrove, S. (May 1988). "Seventh City Techno". The Face. No. 97. p. 88. ISSN 0263-1210.
- Reynolds, S. (1999). Generation Ecstasy: Into the World of Techno and Rave Culture. New York: Routledge. ISBN 978-0415923736.
- Rietveld, H. C. (1998). This is Our House: House Music, Cultural Spaces and Technologies. Aldershot: Ashgate. ISBN 978-1857422429.
- Sicko, D. (1999). Techno Rebels: The Renegades of Electronic Funk. Billboard Books. ISBN 978-0823084289.
- St John, G., ed. (2001). FreeNRG: Notes From the Edge of the Dance Floor. Melbourne: Common Ground. ISBN 978-1863350846.
