= End Beginnings =

Studio album by Sandwell District
- Released: 28 March 2025
- Genre: Techno
- Length: 50:49
- Label: The Point of Departure
- Producer: Regis; Function

Sandwell District chronology
Feed-Forward (2010)	End Beginnings (2025)

Singles from End Beginnings
- 1. "Hidden" Released: 15 January 2025

End Beginnings is a studio album by techno group Sandwell District. It was released on 28 March 2025, via the Point of Departure Recording Company, in CD, LP and digital formats.

== Background ==
The album, released fifteen years after the group's last full-length release Feed-Forward in 2010, was produced by Regis and Function, who are the remaining members of Sandwell District, following the death of long-time member Silent Servant in 2024. Regis commented about the album creation process, "Having a good time is pretty much why you get into it in the first place. And it is fun. I think we feel a lot more fortunate now, especially with what happened with Juan. We're grateful." "Hidden" was released as a single on 15 January 2025.

== Reception ==
Professional ratings
Review scores
Source	Rating
Pitchfork	6.3/10
Mojo	4/5 stars

The album received a rating of 6.3 from Pitchfork, whose reviewer Ray Philp noted it as "the sound of the collective letting loose." Louder Than War referred to it as "a majestic combination of cinematic techno and mind-bending dancefloor dynamism." Reid BG of Resident Advisor observed that "the album is flush with clubland missiles, but the songs also reveal mysterious melodies, revealing something more delicate within," stating "It's the sound of techno at its most human—fragile, furious and unflinchingly alive."

The Quietus' Jon Buckland remarked, "It might not have the initial groundbreaking impact of its predecessor, but End Beginnings pushes the techno continuum on, inch by inch, bleep by alien bleep, beat by rib-crushing beat." In a four-star review, Mojo stated, "Striding purposefully between sinewy, heads-down grooves and contemplative soundscapes, End Beginnings can fill rooms — but is equally devastating on headphones."

== Track listing ==
End Beginnings track listing
No.	Title	Length
1.	"Dreaming"	6:58
2.	"Self-Initiate"	6:30
3.	"Will You Be Safe"	6:34
4.	"Restless"	6:15
5.	"Least Travelled"	5:06
6.	"Citrinitas Acid"	5:36
7.	"Hidden"	7:56
8.	"The Silent Servant"	5:54
Total length:		50:49
