= Exit Stance =

EP by JK Flesh
- Released: November 30, 2017
- Studio: Avalanche Studios
- Genre: Techno; industrial
- Length: 19:54
- Label: Downwards Records
- Producer: Justin Broadrick

JK Flesh chronology
Rise Above (2016)	Exit Stance (2017)	PI04 (2018)

Professional ratings
Review scores
Source	Rating
Resident Advisor	4/5 stars

Exit Stance is an EP by JK Flesh, a moniker of English musician Justin Broadrick, and was released on November 30, 2017 through Downwards Records as a digital download and as a vinyl. Described as more dance-oriented than the previous JK Flesh EP, Nothing Is Free, Exit Stance covers themes of "whiteout, transcendence and self-annihilation."

== Reception ==
Writing for Resident Advisor, Andrew Ryce said "Doubling down on what he does best while stepping into a new arena with confidence, Exit Stance establishes Broadrick as a bonafide techno artist." Chang Terhune of Igloo Magazine praised the EP, writing, "Exit Stance is an excellent addition to Broadrick’s catalog, giving the listener plenty to enjoy while tantalizing with the possibility of more like this to come in the future."

== Track listing ==
All music is composed by Justin Broadrick

No.	Title	Length
1.	"Exit Stance"	5:51
2.	"Motivated by Jealousy"	4:50
3.	"Bullied by Love"	4:22
4.	"Caveman"	4:51
Total length:		19:54

== Personnel ==
- Justin Broadrick – instruments, production
