= KVB =

KVB may refer to:

- The KVB, a British audio-visual music duo
- Contrôle de vitesse par balises or KVB, a train protection system used on the French railway network
- Karur Vysya Bank, an Indian private sector bank
- Kölner Verkehrs-Betriebe, the municipal public transit company of Cologne, Germany
