= JK Flesh =

English musician

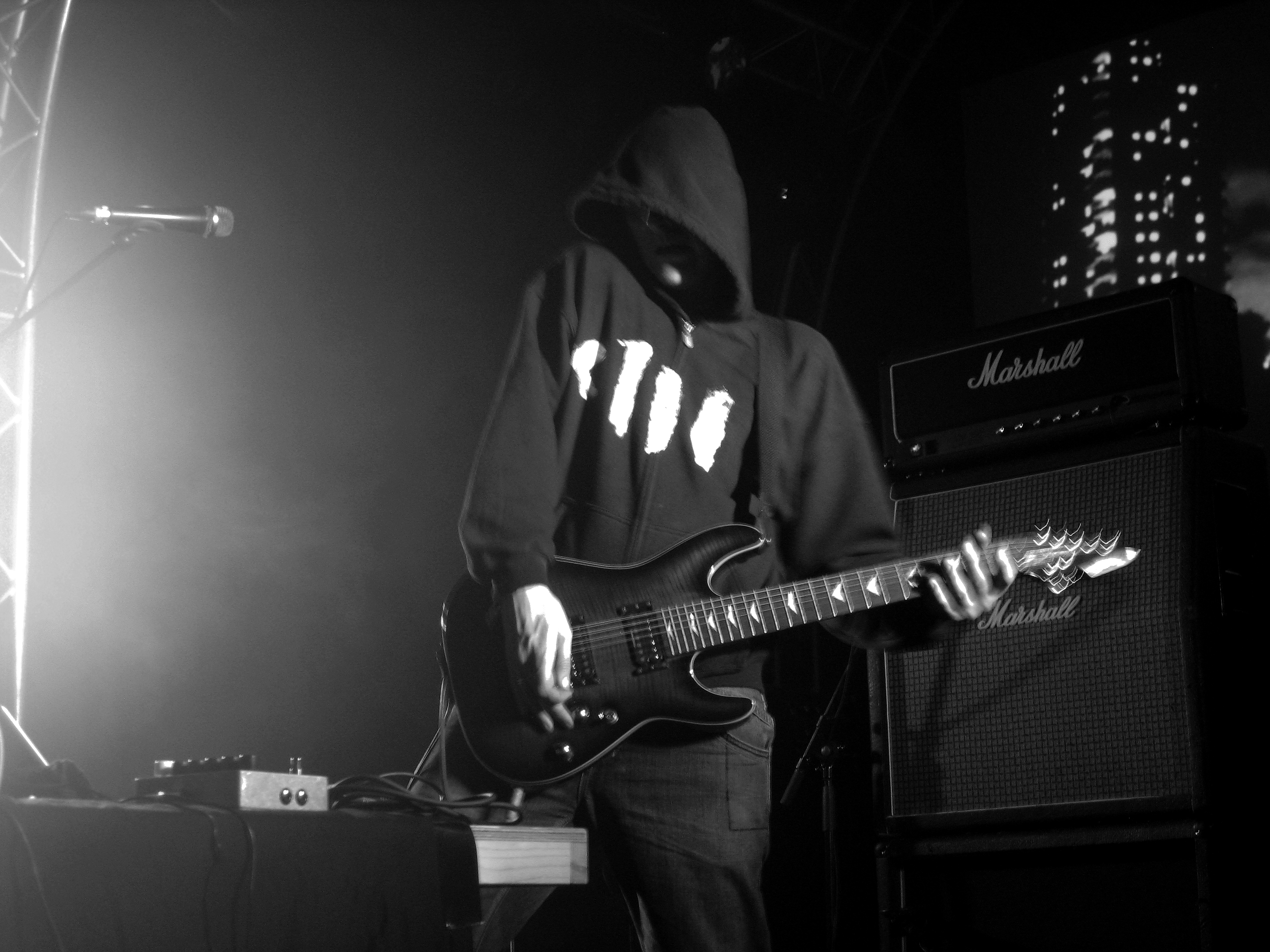
- Justin Broadrick performing as JK Flesh at Roadburn 2012

Background information
- Origin: Birmingham, England, UK
- Genres: Electronic music; techno; industrial music
- Years active: 2012–present
- Labels: Avalanche Recordings; Electric Deluxe; Hospital Productions; Downwards Records
- Members: Justin Broadrick
- Website: Official website

JK Flesh is a moniker of English musician Justin Broadrick employed for his solo work within electronic music. Broadrick's usage of the title spans back to his work in the 1990s with Kevin Martin in Techno Animal, but he first released a solo studio album as JK Flesh in 2012. Unlike Broadrick's most well-known projects, Godflesh and Jesu, his work as JK Flesh is electronic and (apart from Posthuman) lacks metal riffs. Over the years, the project has shifted into a more minimal and dub sound while retaining its industrial influences.

As JK Flesh, Broadrick has released four studio albums, five EPs, a split album with Prurient, and a number of remixes.

== History ==
=== Background ===
In the early 1990s, Justin Broadrick became interested in producing hip hop and drum and bass music. While this influence is felt in some of his more prominent releases, like in Godflesh's 1991 EP Slavestate and 1992 album Pure, Broadrick fully explored these genres privately in a solo capacity or incorporated the work into his collaborative projects such as Techno Animal with Kevin Martin. A few of these experiments saw release within various compilation albums, others such as his short lived projects Tech-Level 2 and Youpho saw releases on British jungle label Hardleaders. Broadrick himself briefly ran a minimal techno label in the late 90s called Lo Fibre through which he released EPs of his projects Solaris B.C. with Diarmuid Dalton and The Sidewinder with Martin. A portion of this material was rereleased compiled under the name The Lo Fibre Companion (1998) on Invisible Records. Broadrick and Dalton would later play together in Jesu and release three albums together as Council Estate Electronics, an analog synthesizer project inspired by Shard End where they grew up in.

=== Solo releases ===
In 2009 Broadrick compiled some of the JK Flesh tracks he created from 1997 to 1999 in an album named From Hell released under the title Krackhead, but it wasn't until 2012 that he fully embarked on the project. In an interview, Broadrick estimated around 17,000 electronic tracks that had created between 1990 and 2012 and were sitting in his archives. Regarding JK Flesh's inception, Broadrick said:

I felt in the late 2000s that I finally wished to pursue this solo, and the JK Flesh pseudonym seemed most fitting since this was my pseudonym in the projects Kevin Martin and I shared [...] It feels free for me to explore the heavier side of what I love about techno, grime/garage, drum and bass, etc.

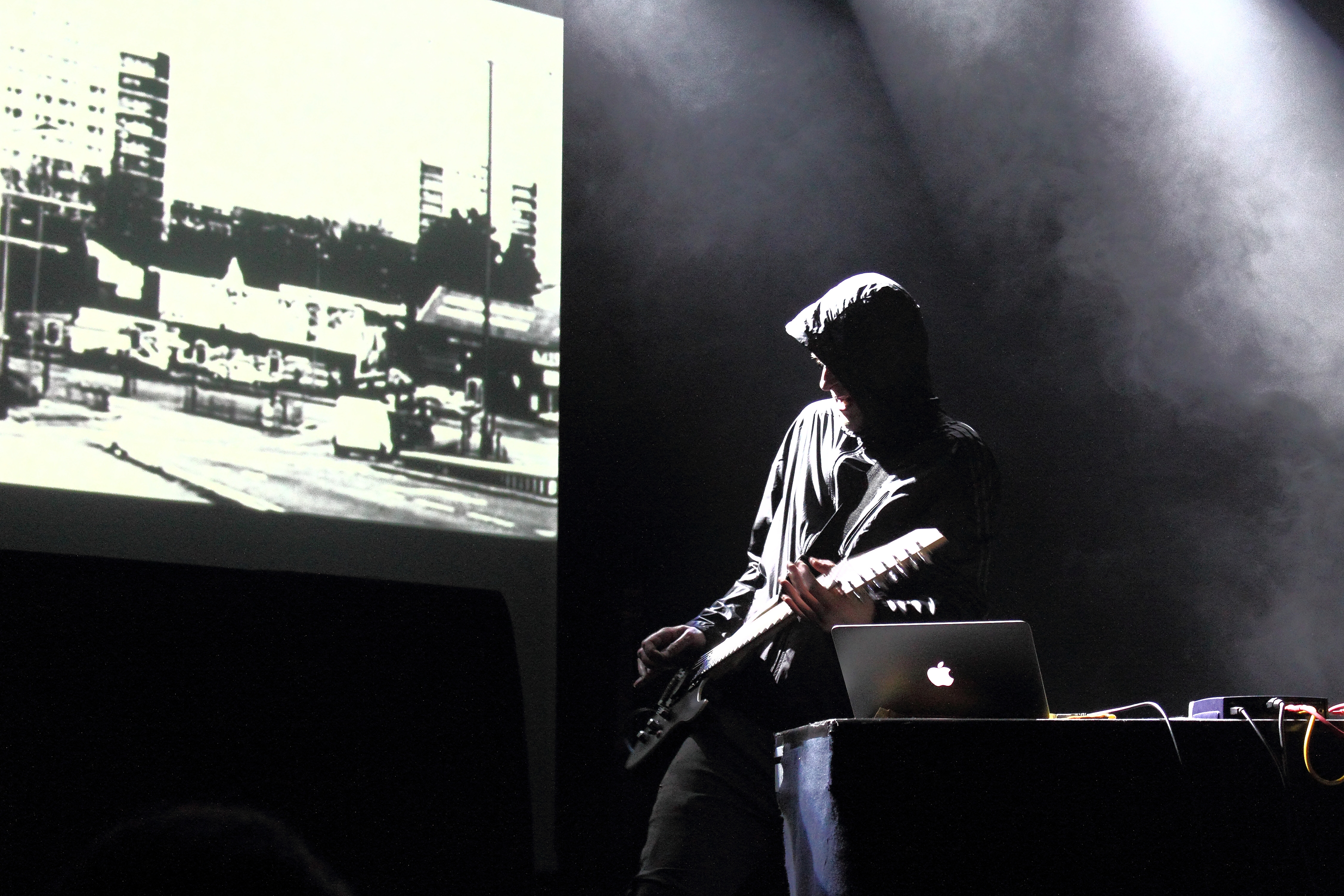
JK Flesh performing in 2013

JK Flesh was also conceived as the antithesis of Broadrick's more melodically driven electronica project Pale Sketcher, with JK Flesh constituting "the angry, hateful, disenchanted side of [...] electronic beat-driven, bass-driven music". It is also an "electronic continuation" of Greymachine (his project with Aaron Turner from the band Isis), a "monolith of nasty, bloated sounding shit".

As a project for Broadrick to fully explore niche areas of electronic and dub music, JK Flesh eschews many conventions that he and his listeners had become used to. The project's debut album, Posthuman (2012), still features heavily downtuned guitars, thick distortion, and a bleak mood–aspects all common in Broadrick's other music–but the beats are less industrial and more dance- and techno-oriented. The heavy guitars ultimately weren't his "long term [...] vision for [the] project" though, and were instead added based on the label's suggestion.

JK Flesh's following releases ventured further into extreme distortion and drum and bass with the Nothing Is Free EP (2015) and the second album, Rise Above (2016). The EPs Exit Stance (2017) and PI04 (2018) adopted a more purely techno sound. Following another EP in 2018 titled Wasplike, JK Flesh's third studio album, New Horizon, was released on 28 September 2018.

== Influences ==
Broadrick's electronic work was informed by the early rave parties he attended in the early 90s seeing Jeff Mills, Robert Hood, Plastikman and Aphex Twin as well as his friendship with fellow Brummie Karl O'Connor better known as Regis, the head of Downwards Records. Broadrick also went on to call Dillinja his "favorite producer of filthy bass and cutting breakbeats, absolutely direct, textures unlike any, the ultimate DnB producer". Broadrick has also credited Moritz von Oswald's dub techno projects Basic Channel and Maurizio as well as his record label Chain Reaction as a main influence on JK Flesh.

JK Flesh's sound has also been compared to Andy Stott and Ancient Methods.

== Discography ==
=== Studio albums ===
- Posthuman (2012)
- Rise Above (2016)
- New Horizon (2018)
- Depersonalization (2020)
- New Religions Old Rules (2022)
- Sewer Bait (2022)
- Echo Chamber Music 01 (2024)
- Live. 2018 (2025)
- Prehuman. Fleshstep (2026)

=== EPs ===
- Nothing Is Free (2015)
- Suicide Estate / Suicide Estate Antibiotic Armageddon (2016)
- Exit Stance (2017)
- PI04 (2018)
- Wasplike (2018)
- In Your Pit (2019)
- Veneer of Tolerance (2022)
- No Exits (2023)
- PI11 (2023)

=== Remix albums ===
- Veneer of Tolerance Remixes (2024)

=== Collaboration albums ===
- Light Bringer with Orphx (live) (2019)
- Echology Vol 1 with Echologist (2020)
- Disintegration Dubs with G36 (2021)
- Discipline Theory with Cruel Decisions and Israel Vines (2025)

=== Split releases ===
- Worship Is the Cleansing of the Imagination with Prurient (2012)
- Knights of the Black Table with Goth-Trad (2019)
- Halved with Klaska (2019)
- See Red (2021) - split EP with Monrella
- Gnod Vs. JK Flesh with Gnod (2021)
- Shouting the Odds with Monrella (2026)

=== Singles ===
- "Nothing Is Free" (2016)
- "Dissociation (Rainforest Spiritual Enslavement Extended Remix)" (2020)

=== Other ===
- Submerged Technology – album released as Solaris B.C. (2009)
- From Hell – album released as Krackhead (2009)
- "No Self Control" – track on the A Disseminated Darkness on Inner Personality Status compilation (2016)
- "Need for Ritual" – unreleased track on the Electric Deluxe 170 podcast (2016)
- "The Stranger" – unreleased track on the Secret Thirteen 200 podcast (2016)
- "Entitlement Issues" – track on the Unrelenting Noise VA001 compilation (2017)
- "One Desire No Purpose" – unreleased track on the Solid Steel podcast (2017)
- "Light Bringer" – collaborative track with Orphx on the Berlin Atonal – Force Majeure compilation (2017)
- "Dog (feat. JK Flesh)" and "Pray (feat. JK Flesh)" – bonus tracks on Concrete Desert by The Bug vs Earth (2017)
- "Being" – track on the Elephant Road compilation (2017)
- "Black Market – track on No Exit Strategy of Certain Benefit split (2018)
- "Warning" – track on the Music 2 Heal the Earth compilation (2018)
- "Chelmsley Wood" – track on the Variable compilation (2018)
- "Underpass (Weightless Version)" – track on the Shared Meanings mix/compilation by Mumdance (2018)
- "Inquisition" – track on the V.A. – 0.02 compilation (2019)
- "Static Demon" – track on the Limits Of Existence Vol.4 compilation (2019)
- "Decontrol" – track on the Berghain 09 mix/compilation by Vatican Shadow (2019)
- "House Of Fun" – track on the V.A. – 0.03 compilation (2019)
- "The Simplicity Of Ignorance" – track on the Against The Grain Vol2 compilation (2019)
- "Human Pack Animals" – track on the Dogfight compilation (2019)
- "Jellyfish" – track on the "Murder 01" compilation (2020)
- "Live In Amsterdam" with Orphx – track on the Divide & Rule compilation (2020)
- "Enduring Endurance" - track on the 5 Years 5OIL Records compilation (2023)

=== Remixes ===
- Necessary Intergalactic Cooperation – "Big Smoke Dub" (2007)
- Final – "Inanimate Air (JK Flesh Remix)" (2010)
- Cloaks – "Rust On Metal (JK Flesh Remix)" (2011)
- Jesu – "Christmas (JK Flesh Remix)" (2012)
- Violetshaped – "cX31Ø (JK Flesh Reshape)" (2013)
- RA – "Paz Podre (JK Flesh Remix)" (2014)
- AnD – "Non Sky Signal Noise (Justin Broadrick as JK Flesh Remix)" (2015)
- Necessary – "Insisting on Racial Name Calling (JK Flesh Remix)" (2015)
- Health – "Men Today (JK Flesh Remix)" (2017)
- These Hidden Hands – "Dendera Light (JK Flesh Remix)" (2017)
- Survive – "Other (Justin K Broadrick as JK Flesh Remix)" (2017)
- Addremove – "Crie (JK Flesh Remix)" (2017)
- Dead Fader – "FYI (JK Flesh Remix)" (2017)
- Godflesh – "In Your Shadow (JK Flesh Reshape)" (2017)
- End Christian – "Altered for Concern (JK Flesh Mix)" (2018)
- Phal:Angst – "The Books (JK Flesh Remix)" (2018)
- Pessimist – "New Age (JK Flesh Remix)" (2019)
- Joe Mesmar – "Transistor Rhythm" (JK Flesh Extended Reshape) – two mixes (2019)
- Sons of Alpha Centauri – "Hitmen (JK Flesh Remix)" (2019)
- I Murdered – "Insomnia (JK Flesh Remix)" (2019)
- Vatican Shadow – "The House of the Followers (JK Flesh Remix)" (2019)
- Paragon – "Black Imagining (JK Flesh Remix)" (2020)
- Viviankrist – "Blue Iron (Iron Flesh Reshape by JK Flesh)" (2020)
