= Poisoned Electrick Head =

English psychedelic indie rock/punk band

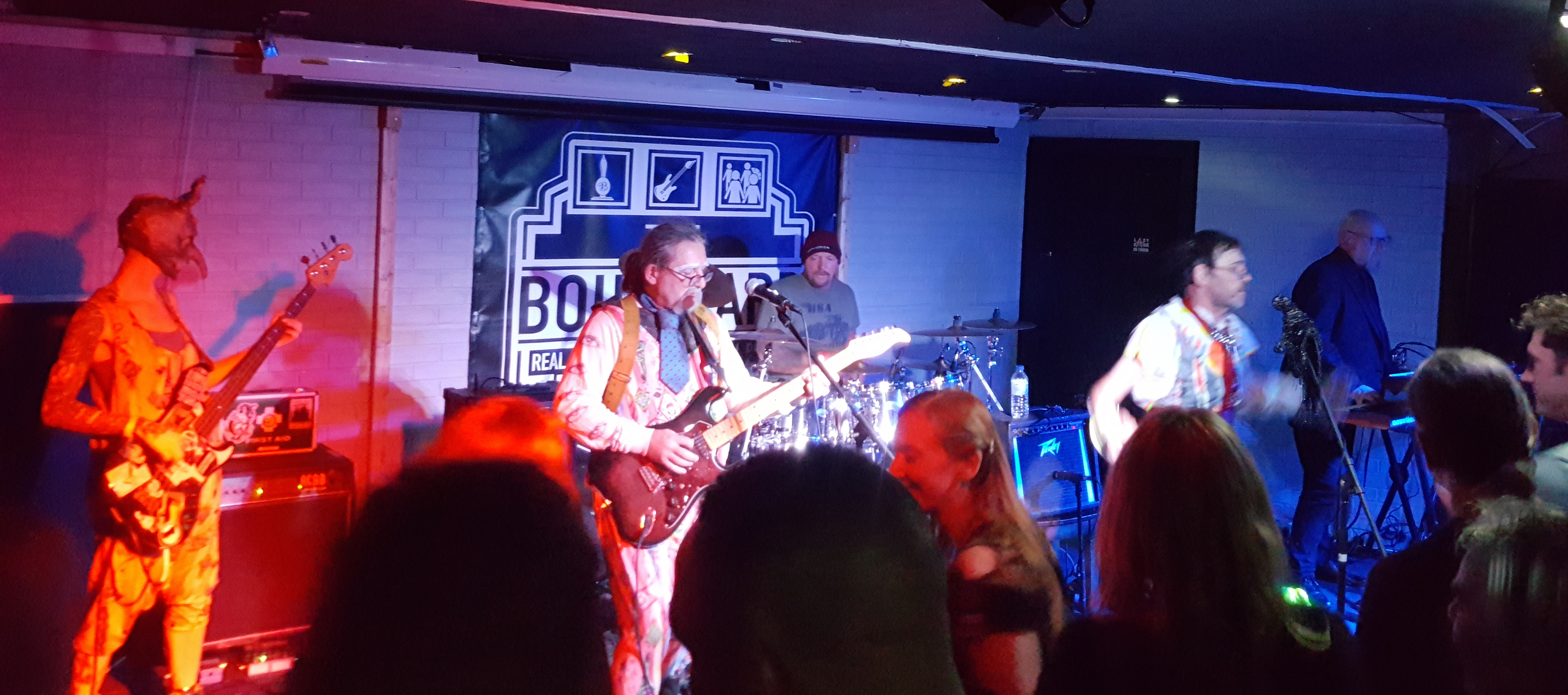
- Poisoned Electrick Head performing in 2020

Background information
- Origin: St Helens, Merseyside, England
- Genres: Psychedelic rock; space rock; new wave; post-punk; indie rock
- Years active: 1986–1998; 2009–present
- Labels: Dead Fly; Probe Plus; Abstract Sounds; Voiceprint
- Members: Emerald Greenshade; Jefferson Jesu Devil; Vik Vibe; Moose Mother
- Past members: Katmandu; Tjunca B Low; Professor Bubblekeys; Phil ZaPeep; Captain O'Ship; Dr Baron Igor Von Pronkenstein
- Website: poisonedelectrickhead.com

Poisoned Electrick Head (PEH) is an English psychedelic indie rock/punk band formed in 1986 in St Helens, Merseyside, England. The band is best known for the 1994 independent chart hit "Out of Order" and for its fantasy-costumed stage act. Poisoned Electrick Head split up in 1998 and formally reformed in 2009. The band's name is taken from the final words sung by Vivian Stanshall in the Bonzo Dog Doo-Dah Band track, "My Pink Half of the Drainpipe".

== Musical style ==
The Poisoned Electrick Head sound could be described as a combination of space rock and angular post-punk, with heavy, distorted guitars and analog synthesizers providing an idiosyncratic backing to the two lead vocalists' unconventional scattergun delivery. An early review in the popular music magazine NME described them as sounding like "UK Subs playing early Genesis". and the band drew frequent comparisons to Hawkwind, Devo and Cardiacs. Many Poisoned Electrick Head tracks also experimented with ambient electronic passages, dropped-in samples and dub techniques.

== History ==
Poisoned Electrick Head formed when seven musicians in the St Helens area opted to join forces. The band members had previously played together in different permutations since the late 1970s. From the start, the band displayed a theatrical flair, with each member operating under a pseudonym - singers "Emerald Greenshade" and "Katmandu", rhythm guitarist "Jefferson Jesu(s) Devil", lead guitarist "Philippe ZaPeep", keyboard player "Professor Bubblekeys", bass guitarist "Tjunca B Low" and drummer "Vik Vibeskin". An unofficial eighth member, Bubblekeys's brother known as "Burt Sliders", served as sound man and sound designer.

Emerald, Vik and Zapeep had been in a punk band called Subversion in 1979, and both Emerald (keys)had been part of The Aristocrats releasing a track on the Elegance Charm & Deadly Danger LP (along with Jesu Vik and Katmandu) in 1982. Bubblekeys and Tjunca - along with another pseudonymous musician, "Flimb" (drums) and Doug Eglin (vocal/guitar) - had worked together as the Academy Of Unrest (who released the Sheol Hex/Rise of Doubt/Hope 12" EP in 1986 and the track 'Sensitive' on compilation album 'Elegance, Charm and Deadly Danger'). By 1985, Jesu, Emerald & Vik were in a band called Moon, to which they recruited Tjunca, initially as keyboard player - he would subsequently move to bass guitar on the arrival of Bubblekeys. Zapeep was the next addition to the band, in early 1986: later in the same year Katmandu was recruited (initially as a proposed replacement for Greenshade, but subsequently as his singing partner).

The band's first release was the 1986 cassette-only mini-album Drink Me, followed three years later by the "Trickeroo/Cap of Flies" single.

Throughout the 1980s and 1990s, Poisoned Electrick Head built up a fiercely devoted live following in their hometown and in other parts of the UK. By the start of the 1990s, the band had taken their onstage theatricality a step further, with the singers dressing in boiler-suits and wearing latex "death masks" and other bizarre stage costumes while the remaining band members wore ornate H. R. Giger-esque "alien domeheads" and robes. The band's album sleeves were adorned with similarly Giger-esque artwork, designed (as were the costumes) by Zapeep.

Behind the scenes, Poisoned Electrick Head continued to be self-producing and self-releasing, putting out many of their releases on their own Dead Fly label while licensing others to various independent labels. The band played numerous tours, concerts, festivals and underground gatherings including the Stonehenge Free Festival, Glastonbury Festival and the legendary Castlemorton Common Festival of 1992. Poisoned Electrick Head also played with numerous underground bands and artists of the time including Hawkwind, Cardiacs, Gong, Senser, Back to the Planet and Arthur Brown. In 1991, the band contributed a song (their popular live favourite Snobs) to the Delerium Records compilation album A Psychedelic Psauna (In Four Parts).

In 1992, the band licensed their first full-length album, Poisoned Electrick Head to the independent label Probe Plus Records. This was followed later in the same year by another cassette album, Unmistakeably Rainbow Trout, released on Dead Fly. Two years after that, the band licensed and released a second full-release album The Big Eye Am on another independent label, Abstract Sounds. The tracks on the record included "Out of Order" which was released as a single: this became an independent chart hit, accompanied by a video made by the band themselves.

By 1997 the band had around 800 gigs to their credit, but eleven years of hard underground gigging had taken its toll and the band was beginning to fracture. Katmandu had left the band during the 1996 recording sessions for their third album, The Hanged Man, leaving Emerald as sole lead vocalist (with occasional backup from Bubblekeys). Around this time the band also dispensed with their stage costumes, as it was considered that these were holding the band back. The Hanged Man was released on the Blueprint label (a subdivision of Voiceprint) but during the promotional tour Tjunca also departed. The band continued to play live, using taped basslines, and subsequently went through a period with greater vocal input from Bubblekeys, a harder and more metallic sound and the inclusion of rapping. In 1998, Bubblekeys also left the band and Poisoned Electrick Head was put on hold for a decade.

In the mid-2000s (decade), the remaining four members - Jesu, Emerald, Vibeskin and Zapeep- regrouped with Burt under the "PEH" name to record new music. Although the band was briefly referred to as "Purified Electrick Heart", they reverted to their original name when they played at the Rebellion Festival in Blackpool in the summer of 2009, a concert which also saw the band returning to wearing stage costumes (although different ones from those worn in the 1990s). The band played at the same event in 2010 with a lineup of Jesu, Emerald and Vik (assisted by Burt), joined by a previously unmentioned bassist called "Bigshed George" and two guest performers - Nik Turner (of Hawkwind) and Arthur Brown as event narrator.

In 2011, Poisoned Electrick Head played the Rebellion Festival again, unveiling a new album called Where the Power Is (which featured guest contributions from Arthur Brown and Bubblekeys) and subsequently joined the Wreck'n'Roll Circus tour. A forum posting from Poisoned Electrick Head on the Ozric Tentacles discussion forum on 6 March 2011 listed the current band as PEH (under their usual pseudonyms) with new recruits "Captain O’Ship" (keyboards, backing vocals, samples) and "Moose Mother" (bass guitar).

In 2014, drummer Vik Vibeskin won £1,045,504 on the National Lottery. At a similar time, the Captain was replaced on the keyboards by one "Dr Baron Igor Von Pronkenstein".

In 2017, the band released the second in the "Jedder" series of albums, The Purified Electrick Heart, which again featured Arthur Brown narrating.

=== Former members ===
Various former band members are now active with other projects. Bubblekeys is now based in Belgium and performs as a solo act called Android 80. In 2011 he released a solo album 'Suburban Robot'(a nod to Devo's 'Smart Patrol' "...suburban robots to monitor reality"). He was nominated for best Electronic artist in 'Les Octaves de la Musique 2012', the Belgian Music Awards. In 2010, he published an autobiography called "Take Your Protein Pills: The Poisoned Electrick Head Story" which detailed his life with the band. Tjunca now teaches music technology but also occasionally plays bass and has a project called Bunfly. Zapeep now works as a tattooist in Wallasey.

== Band members ==
=== Current ===
- Dammo Buster - Lead Vox (2021)
- Jefferson Jesus Devil AKA the Dancer - Lead Vox - guitar, synthesizer, backing vocals (1986–present)
- Moose Mother AKA Don`t fuck with the Moose - bass guitar (2011 onwards)
- Vik Vibe AKA Sing along with Vik - drums (1986–present)
- OQ Pye - Guitar (2019-present)
- Burt Sliders - sound design and sonic manipulation (1986–present)

=== Former ===
- Emerald Greenshade AKA Vicious Weed - lead vocals (1986– 1998, guitar & keyboards (2009–2019)
- Katmandu - lead vocals (1986–1997)
- Tjunca B Low - bass guitar (1986–1997)
- Professor Bubblekeys - keyboards, vocals (1986–1998)
- Dr Baron Igor Von Pronkenstein - keyboards, samples (2012-2018)
- Philippe ZaPeep - lead guitar, programming, costume design & artwork (1986-c. 2010)
- Bigshed George - bass guitar (?-2011)

== Discography ==
=== Albums ===
- Drink Me (Dead Fly Records 1986) (cassette only)
- Poisoned Electrick Head (Probe Plus 1992)
- Unmistakeably Rainbow Trout (Dead Fly Records 1992) (cassette only)
- The Big Eye Am (Abstract Sounds 1994)
- The Hanged Man (Voiceprint Records 1996)
- Where the Power Is (self-released 2011)
- The Purified Electrick Heart (self-released 2017)

=== Singles ===
- Telebot flexi 7" (St. Helens Music Collective 1989) (A split single release with All of Everything on the other side)
- Trickeroo/Cap Of Flies (7" Dead Fly Records 1989) (Limited to 1000 copies)
- Out of Order (7", 12" and CD Abstract Sounds 1994)

=== Compilation appearances ===
- Various Artists, A Psychedelic Psauna (In Four Parts) (Delerium Records, 1991) - includes "Snobs".
- Various Artists, New Reaction compilation, (1987) - includes "Telebot"

=== Other ===
Several dozen bootleg live performances also remain in circulation.
