= Second Process =

2017 EP by LSD

Studio album by LSD
- Released: 18 August 2019
- Genre: Techno
- Label: LSD records
- Producer: Luke Slater, Steve Bicknell, Dave Sumner

LSD chronology
Process (2017)	Second Process (2019)

"Second Process" is a 2019 album by the techno group LSD, a collective composed of producers Luke Slater, Steve Bicknell, and Dave Sumner (aka Function).

The songs are described as "melodic and mind-melting techno with surreal atmospheres and propulsive drum-programming", and directly follow from their highly regarded 2017 EP "Process".

== Track listing ==
All tracks written and produced by Slater, Bicknell and Sumner.

- Process 4
- Process 5
- Process 6
- Process 7
- Process 8
- Process 9
