= Rise Above (JK Flesh album) =

Second studio album by English musician Justin Broadrick

Studio album by JK Flesh
- Released: 3 June 2016
- Studio: Avalanche Studios
- Genre: Electro-industrial; techno
- Length: 44:40
- Label: Electric Deluxe
- Producer: Justin Broadrick

JK Flesh chronology
Suicide Estate (2016)	Rise Above (2016)	Exit Stance (2017)

Rise Above is the second studio album by JK Flesh, a moniker of English musician Justin Broadrick, and was released digitally and on vinyl on 3 June 2016 through the label Electric Deluxe under the designation EDLX.048. It is Broadrick's fourth release under the JK Flesh title and continues the sparse, drum and bass style of Nothing Is Free, the EP released a year earlier.

== Composition ==
"Conquered"
"Conquered" showcases JK Flesh's shift into danceable techno.

Inspired by Broadrick's childhood in industrial Birmingham, Rise Above's sound is characterized by heavy distortion, kinetic beats, and noisy production. In keeping with the JK Flesh evolution, nearly all elements of industrial metal are gone from this album and replaced with starker, more synthetic sounds. John Twells of Fact wrote, "The doomy, distorted grind of Godflesh and Jesu is certainly still present, but woven into a wheezing 4/4 template that doesn’t sound a million miles from Andy Stott’s patented 'knackered house' or a Surgeon record on the wrong speed being played through a broken car stereo." Chang Terhune of Igloo Magazine also drew comparisons between Rise Above and the work of Andy Stott. Heathen Harvest likened the album's percussion driven approach to early industrial albums: "The predominant sound is that of the factory: machines, machines, and more machines."

According to Broadrick, his vision for JK Flesh was only fully realized with Rise Above. About the deliberate shift away from guitar and industrial beats, he said, "Wildly divisive, its lack of guitars and its adherence to 4/4 techno, has led to a misunderstanding of this project's intentions, but I find this is positive. I'm doing something ‘real', and I'm doing it because I need and love doing it. This shouldn't be easy for anyone."

== Reception ==
Professional ratings
Review scores
Source	Rating
The Quietus	Positive
Resident Advisor	4/5 stars

Rise Above received positive reviews. Writing for The Quietus, Tristan Bath said "So frank and brutal are the whiteknuckled grooves and aggression on Rise Above it’s tougher than ever to imagine where Broadrick will go next." Resident Advisor reviewer Justin Farrar wrote "It's a rare musician who could make music this bleak sound utterly engrossing."

In another very positive review Ben Hudgins of Heathen Harvest called Rise Above "unadulterated machine music that’s been crafted by a master engineer."

== Track listing ==
All music is composed by Justin Broadrick

No.	Title	Length
1.	"Tunnel"	6:06
2.	"Defector"	5:32
3.	"Swarm"	5:31
4.	"Conquered"	5:12
5.	"Trinity"	4:53
6.	"Rise Above"	5:26
7.	"Cast"	5:52
8.	"Low Alloy"	6:05
Total length:		44:40

== Personnel ==
Taken from the Rise Above liner notes.

- Justin Broadrick – instruments, production
