= Wasplike =

2018 techno album by JK Flesh

EP by JK Flesh
- Released: 15 June 2018
- Studio: Avalanche Studios
- Genre: Techno; industrial
- Length: 18:37
- Label: Inner Surface Music (INNER014)
- Producer: Justin Broadrick

JK Flesh chronology
PI04 (2018)	Wasplike (2018)	New Horizon (2018)

Wasplike is the fifth EP by JK Flesh, a moniker of English musician Justin Broadrick, and was released on 15 June 2018. It was his first release on Manchester techno label Inner Surface Music. The EP was inspired by the drum and bass works of Dillinja, amongst others.

== Release and reception ==
Wasplike was released on 15 June 2018 as a limited 12-inch EP.

Resident Advisor gave the EP a rating of 3.7/5 and called it "one track shy of brutal perfection", saying that when compared to one of Broadrick's previous EPs, 2017's Exit Stance, Wasplike is "even colder and more smothering, dialling up the tension between paranoia and pleasure, weariness and euphoria."

== Track listing ==
All music is composed by Justin Broadrick.

No.	Title	Length
1.	"Wasplike"	4:47
2.	"Mindprison"	4:49
3.	"New Build Estate"	4:23
4.	"Dark Horse"	4:38
Total length:		18:37

== Personnel ==
Credits adapted from Wasplike liner notes

JK Flesh

- Justin Broadrick – instruments, production

Technical personnel

- Ajna Design – artwork
- Lewis Hopkin – mastering
