= Nothing Is Free =

EP by JK Flesh
- Released: 7 September 2015
- Recorded: 2013–2015
- Studio: Avalanche Studios
- Genre: Industrial
- Length: 55:05
- Label: Avalanche Recordings
- Producer: Justin Broadrick

JK Flesh chronology
Worship Is the Cleansing of the Imagination (2012)	Nothing Is Free (2015)	Suicide Estate (2016)

Nothing Is Free is the debut EP of JK Flesh, a pseudonym of English musician Justin Broadrick, and was self-released digitally by Avalanche Recordings on a pay what you want basis on 7 September 2015. It is Broadrick's third release under the JK Flesh title, following the debut studio album, Posthuman (2012), and a split album with Prurient, Worship Is the Cleansing of the Imagination (2012).

== Content ==
"Hide & Seek"
"Hide & Seek" showcases the EP's shift from heavy metal guitar to a more purely electronic sound.

Unlike Posthuman, Nothing Is Free adopts a sparser, more sterile drum and bass sound. Most of the traditional metal riffs are gone and replaced with abrasive washes of bass and other synthesizer noises, which Broadrick saw as a more honest realization of what he set out to do with the JK Flesh project. The EP has been noted for its high level of aural aggression as well as ability to be both disturbing and danceable. The tracks on the album are slower and more darkly psychedelic than those on Posthuman, with Broadrick commenting "I love working in that slowish, 80 to 90 BPM, super fucking gray area. A lot of DJs don’t want to play that stuff, but for me, it’s a great zone to experiment."

Greg Kennelty of Metal Injection wrote, "The album is a compilation of works Broadrick did between 2013 and 2015, though I wouldn't call these b-sides or anything. They sound like fully-formed, well-produced songs that belong on pretty much any of his projects." Despite being categorized as an EP, Nothing Is Free clocks in at 55:05, which is longer than many traditional studio albums, including JK Flesh's 2016 follow-up release Rise Above.

== Reception ==
Crack Magazine's Billy Black described the EP as "relentless industrial nightmare that proves, if nothing else, that Broadrick is a master of all things unholy," while Klaus Kinski from BrooklynVegan called it "wall to wall sonic brilliance".

Writing for Intravenous Magazine, Sean Palfrey summed up Nothing Is Free saying it "blends elements of dub, industrial and noise into a heady and oppressive mix of throbbing beats, swirling synths, static, distorted vocals, and subtle melodies that is cerebral in its execution" and "a rewarding listen".

Allen Griffin from Burning Ambulance said Broadrick "displays a keen awareness of beat culture" and praised his sonic palette. Freq agreed calling the EP "supremely confident and knowledgable (sic)", also adding that "Nothing Is Free almost palpably swelters, demands motion, forces the body to change its way of being, to take a chance on total immersion in skilfully structured, blissfully overwhelming noise".

== Track listing ==
All music is composed by Justin Broadrick

No.	Title	Length
1.	"Nothing Is Free"	5:10
2.	"Hide & Seek"	5:11
3.	"Boundless Submission"	6:10
4.	"Peace in Pieces"	6:18
5.	"Kontorted"	4:04
6.	"Pleasurer"	10:02
7.	"Offering"	6:48
8.	"They Own You"	5:54
9.	"Nails"	5:24
Total length:		55:05

== Personnel ==
Taken from the Nothing Is Free liner notes

- Justin Broadrick – instruments, production

== Single ==
"Nothing Is Free"

Single by JK Flesh

from the album Nothing Is Free
- Released: May 12, 2016
- Recorded: 2015
- Genre: Industrial techno
- Length: 14:43
- Label: Downwards
- Songwriter(s): Justin Broadrick
- Producer(s): Justin Broadrick

The EP's title track was released as a plain black 12-inch single in 500 copies on 12 May 2016. The B-side features a remix by Broadrick's fellow Birmingham musician, Surgeon, as well as the track "Kontorted".

=== Track listing ===
All music is composed by Justin Broadrick

No.	Title	Length
1.	"Nothing Is Free"	5:10
2.	"Nothing Is Free" (Surgeon remix)	5:29
3.	"Kontorted"	4:04
Total length:		14:43

=== Personnel ===
Taken from the "Nothing Is Free" liner notes

- Justin Broadrick – instruments, production
- Anthony Child – remixing (track 2)
- Matt Colton – mixing
