= Function (musician) =

American musician

- Born: David Charles Sumner; December 1, 1973 (age 52); Brooklyn, New York City
- Genres: Techno music
- Occupations: DJ and producer
- Labels: Synewave

David Charles Sumner (born 1 December 1973), who records as Function, is an American techno DJ and producer.

Born in the Canarsie area of Brooklyn in New York City Sumner's early musical interests included Kraftwerk, Afrika Bambaataa, Man Parrish, John Robie and Arthur Baker, The Human League, New Order and Depeche Mode. and released his first record in 1996, producing work on the Synewave label and becoming the only non-Birmingham Dj to release work on the Downwards Records label.

In 2004 Sumner joined Regis's Sandwell District collective.

== Albums ==
- RA.EX001 (2010)
- Incubation (2013)
- Function : Vatican Shadow -Game Have Rules (2014)
- Existenz (2019)

(With LSD)

- Process (2017)
- Second Process (2019)
