= Process (EP) =

2017 EP by LSD

EP by LSD
- Released: 17 November 2017
- Genre: Techno
- Label: Ostgut Ton
- Producer: Luke Slater, Steve Bicknell, Dave Sumner

LSD chronology
Process (2017)	Second Process (2019)

"Process" (catalogue number "O-Ton 109") is the 2017 debut EP by the techno group LSD, a collaboration between Luke Slater, Steve Bicknell and Function (aka Dave Sumner). The tracks are described as focused on "the psychedelic aspects of techno", and an "interpretation of stroboscopic intensity on the summit of psychedelic experiences - permeated with moments of hypnotic and atonal melodies".

The three producers had worked together at various points over the previous 25 years; Slater and Bicknell remixed various of each others tracks during the early 1990s, Bicknell and Sumner had performed live together, while Sumner appears on a 2015 release from Slater's 'LB Dub Corp' project. The EP was preceded by live concerts in 2016 at the Amsterdam Dance Event and at Berghain in Berlin.

"Process" was released as a 12 inch on 17 November 2017 by the German label, Ostgut Ton, with sleeve art-work by Brazilian-born New York-based artist Eli Sudbrack, aka Assume Vivid Astro Focus.

== Track listing ==
All tracks written and produced by Slater, Bicknell and Sumner.

- Process 1 - 5:08
- Process 2 - 8:26
- Process 3 - 10:40

== Follow up ==
In May 2019, LSD announced the formation of a self-titled record label off-shoot, and the planned release of a six track album, Second Process, on 28 June. The song titles follow on directly after "Process 3", and are numbered "Process 4" to "Process 9". After the tracks were pre-released on SoundCloud, they were described as "melodic and mind-melting techno with surreal atmospheres and propulsive drum-programming."
