= Network 23 (record label) =

Influential free tekno record label

Network 23 was a record label founded by the Spiral Tribe sound system in 1994. Its last release was in 1996. In 2005, the label Network Repress was set up to rerelease tracks.

== History ==
Having left England for mainland Europe after the Castlemorton Common Festival and the ensuing trial for organising it, Spiral Tribe found themselves in Paris and decided to set up a record label. The aim was to start a non-profit communication channel in opposition to the mainstream. Over the next two years, Network 23 released a number of records by members of Spiral Tribe under various aliases such as SP23, 69db and Crystal Distortion. Some tracks were recorded in a mobile studio whilst on the road.

The Spiral Tribe sound came to be known as free tekno, also referred to as spiral hardcore, French hardcore and enimatek. The label also brought out records by invited artists such as Curley, Somatic Responses, Unit Moebius, Headcleaner and Les Boucles Etranges. The first ten records were pressed at MZM in the Czech Republic since the company offered the cheapest price, but the sound quality is low. Nevertheless, most of these records have become classics, selling at a high price on auction sites. Some tracks are still played at parties 10–20 years after they were made.

== Techno Import controversy ==
In 1997, commercial distributors Techno Import released a CD entitled Spiral Tribe The Sound of Teknival. The CD was advertised on television and manufactured 30,000 copies. Techno Import actually registered the word teknival as a trade name. Spiral Tribe members were not informed of this decision until the CD was already produced. They released flyers which began F**k Techno Import and stated Spiral Tribe is not for sale. This, alongside the differing views of people in the collective, eventually led to the winding up of Network 23.

== Slogan ==
- "This is Network 23, the network that means business, now transmitting live to the world." (Opening line of Max Headroom)

== Network Repress ==
In an indication of the popularity of the label, in 2005 a new label, Network Repress was set up to rerelease hard to find classic tracks alongside new or unreleased music by the same artists. Between 2005 and 2013, 24 releases were brought out by various artists from SP23, the new name of Spiral Tribe.

== See also ==
- Czechtek
- List of record labels
