= PI04 =

EP by JK Flesh
- Released: 2 February 2018
- Studio: Avalanche Studios
- Genre: Techno; industrial
- Length: 19:37
- Label: Pi Electronics
- Producer: Justin Broadrick

JK Flesh chronology
Exit Stance (2017)	PI04 (2018)	Wasplike (2018)

PI04 (stylized as π04) is the fourth EP by JK Flesh, a moniker of English musician Justin Broadrick, and was released on 2 February 2018 through Pi Electronics. The EP features a remix by American DJ and producer Silent Servant. This is the fourth release of the Pi Electronics label, and was made available as a limited LP.

== Release ==
PI04 was released on 2 February 2018 as a 12-inch EP limited to 300 copies. The release features no cover, but is instead packaged with a card featuring artwork of an armored man.

== Track listing ==
All music is composed by Justin Broadrick

No.	Title	Length
1.	"PI04.1"	5:13
2.	"PI04.2"	4:48
3.	"PI04.3"	5:16
4.	"PI04.2" (Silent Servant Remix)	4:20
Total length:		19:37

== Personnel ==
- Justin Broadrick – instruments, production
- John Juan Mendez – remixing (4)
