= Silent Servant =

American music producer (1977–2024)

- Birth name: John Juan Mendez
- Born: August 14, 1977; Guatemala
- Origin: Los Angeles, California, U.S.
- Died: January 18, 2024 (aged 46); Los Angeles, California, U.S.
- Genres: Techno
- Occupations: DJ; producer
- Labels: Sandwell District, Hospital Productions, Jealous God, Tresor Records, Modularz, Historia y violencia
- Formerly of: Sandwell District, Tropic of Cancer

John Juan Mendez (August 14, 1977 – January 18, 2024), who recorded as Silent Servant, was an American techno DJ and music producer.

Mendez was a member of the groups Sandwell District and Tropic of Cancer.

== Early life ==
Mendez was born on August 14, 1977 in Guatemala. His parents, and older brother, Eddy Mendez, moved to the United States when Mendez was two years old. He was raised in Westminster, California and attended Pasadena City College.

Mendez grew up listening to The Smiths, The Cure, New Order, My Bloody Valentine and Sonic Youth. He started DJing at the age of 16.

== Career ==
Mendez was a pioneer in the underground techno music scene of Los Angeles. In 1999, he made contact with Regis, the founder of the Birmingham-based Downwards Records label, becoming a member of Regis's Sandwell District collective, with whom he released a series of singles throughout the 2000s. Mendez additionally acted as Sandwell District's art director.

Mendez began releasing music as Silent Servant in 2006 with his The Silent Morning 12". Over the last two decades he released several singles, EPs, collaborative projects and also two full-length solo albums, 2012's Negative Fascination and 2018's Shadows of Death and Desire, both on Hospital Productions. As Silent Servant, he remixed songs by artists including Daniel Avery, Battles, Boy Harsher, Drab Majesty, JK Flesh and Liars. Mendez was also credited with packaging and design on Drab Majesty's second studio album Modern Mirror. In November 2023, he issued his last record, In Memoriam, via Tresor Records.

Mendez also formed the project Tropic of Cancer in 2007 with his then-wife Camella Lobo. The duo's first release was "The Dull Age / Victims" ten-inch single in 2009. Mendez left the group in 2011. Lobo said that Mendez was busy with other projects and she wanted to work on her own.

After Sandwell District disbanded in 2011, Mendez formed the Jealous God label with Regis and James Ruskin in 2013. Jealous God focused primarily on EBM, industrial and techno music. On July 27, 2016, Mendez announced that Jealous God would cease operations.

== Death ==
Mendez died on January 18, 2024, alongside his partner Simone Ling and Luis Vasquez (The Soft Moon), from fentanyl poisoning, while consuming cocaine, thought to be pure. Their three bodies were discovered at Mendez's Los Angeles residence after Vasquez's wife called for a welfare check.
