= Posthuman (JK Flesh album) =

Studio album by JK Flesh
- Released: 7 May 2012
- Recorded: Avalanche Studios
- Genre: Electro-industrial; industrial hip-hop; industrial metal; dubstep
- Length: 55:46 (original release); 87:11 (Posthuman+)
- Label: 3BY3
- Producer: Justin Broadrick

JK Flesh chronology
Posthuman (2012)	Worship Is the Cleansing of the Imagination (2012)

Posthuman is the debut studio album by JK Flesh, a solo moniker of English musician Justin Broadrick, and was released on 7 May 2012 through 3BY3. Though Broadrick had been creating music under the title of JK Flesh since the early 1990s, Posthuman marked the first release of the project.

On 30 April 2012, the track "Knuckledragger" was released in advance of the album for streaming.

== Background and composition ==
In 2010, Broadrick revived the band he was most known for, Godflesh, and toured with it. In 2011, his secondary shoegaze project, Jesu, released its third album. During this period of activity, Broadrick was creating and compiling material for his first solo electronic album. Posthuman, released on 7 May 2012, came out of those efforts, and, due to preceding any new Godflesh material despite the group being reformed, drew attention for being Broadrick's first album in some time to display the brutal heaviness his early music was known for.

"Idle Hands"
"Idle Hands" showcases the album's combination of heavy, distorted guitar, sparse beats, and hip-hop electronics.

Posthuman synthesizes two sounds that Broadrick had been known for: heavy, downtuned guitars paired with distorted vocals and electronic, dub- and hip-hop-influenced beats. Broadrick said Posthuman allowed him to "bridge the gap" that existed between Godflesh and Techno Animal, his electronic project with Kevin Martin. On his employment of the guitar for Posthuman, Broadrick said,

It’s rooted in the Godflesh aesthetic, to some extent. It’s mostly about texture, like most of my music. I don’t consider myself a technical musician in any respect at all. It’s another means to an end - I just abuse guitars, really. With JK Flesh, I’m to some extent using the guitar to try and articulate the electronics. I was trying to do something that was just minimal and dissonant, and I just added texture.

Broadrick later regretted the metal fusion on the record. In a 2018 interview he said "I submitted a lot of post-dubstep, techno, and peripheral sounds to the guy at the label and he was like, ‘God, this shit’s great! But imagine if you put some of your Godflesh guitar and vocals in there.’ In retrospect, I wish I had just left the stuff minimal." He aimed to rectify this with the next release, Nothing Is Free.

== Critical reception ==
Professional ratings
Review scores
Source	Rating
Drowned in Sound	7/10
Pitchfork	7.6/10
The Quietus	Positive
The Skinny	3/5 stars
Spin	8/10

Posthuman received favorable reviews. Brian Howe of Pitchfork appreciated the album's brutality and weight, writing, "Posthuman might not fully win back the crowd that Broadrick alienated with dreamy Jesu, but you can't deny that at least he's back to trying to blacken your eyes rather than put stars in them." Writing for The Quietus, Joe Kennedy praised the album's bleakness and surprisingly subtle employment of certain sounds. Pieter J. Macmillan of Drowned in Sound wrote, "If you’ve got a gap in your record collection for a record with the bite and bile of Godflesh and the swing and swagger of dubstep then Posthuman is just the thing to fill it." In a more lukewarm review, Ross Watson of The Skinny wrote, "Cold and detached, dark and demented, Posthuman is an unapologetically difficult listen. With its detached atmosphere and heavy basslines, it has its middle finger pointed firmly in the direction of the post-dubstep crowd, and will come as a welcome curio for fans of this most cultivated figure of underground music."

== Track listing ==
All music is composed by Justin Broadrick.

No.	Title	Length
1.	"Knuckledragger"	5:28
2.	"Idle Hands"	6:19
3.	"Punchdrunk"	6:22
4.	"Devoured"	7:04
5.	"Posthuman"	6:31
6.	"Earthmover"	5:45
7.	"Dogmatic"	5:56
8.	"Underfoot"	5:51
9.	"Walk Away"	6:30
Total length:		55:46

Posthuman+ (Bandcamp bonus tracks)
No.	Title	Length
10.	"Imperial Majesty"	5:46
11.	"Posthuman" (Dub)	6:56
12.	"Earthmover" (Version)	5:45
13.	"Knuckledragger" (Version)	5:21
14.	"Punchdrunk" (Dub)	7:37
Total length:		87:11

== Personnel ==
Adapted from the Posthuman liner notes.

- Justin Broadrick – instruments, production
- Shawn Joseph – mastering

== Release history ==
Region	Date	Label	Format	Catalog
United Kingdom	2012	3BY3	CD, LP	3BY3009
Japan	2012	Daymare Recordings	2xCD	DYMC-163
United Kingdom	2015	Avalanche Recordings	Music download	
