= Exodus Collective =

Community collective formed in 1992, in Luton, England

- Exodus Collective logo
- Formation: 5 June 1992; 33 years ago
- Founded at: Luton, England
- Type: Civil society campaign, collective
- Purpose: Housing, social exclusion, community projects, social centres
- Region served: Bedfordshire
- Methods: Nonviolent direct action, sound system, DIY culture, squatting

Exodus Collective was a community collective and sound system formed in 1992, in the Marsh Farm area of Luton, England. It organised free parties and became involved in housing, social exclusion, and community projects, founded upon the principle of DIY culture. The group squatted buildings and repeatedly came into conflict with Bedfordshire Police, which by 1995 had resulted in Bedfordshire County Council voting for a public inquiry into alleged police harassment. The licence of a pub owned by the mother of people in the collective was revoked, a decision which was later overturned by a judicial review.

The collective occupied a disused farm and turned it into a community project which they later bought. The fortnightly raves in venues across Bedfordshire attracted up to 10,000 people and, especially during the Marsh Farm riots of 1995, served to defuse tensions locally. By 2000, the collective was holding licensed raves in agreement with landowners. The collective disbanded in 2000, later reforming under the name Leviticus. Some former members were then involved in the Marsh Farm Outreach community group, which successfully campaigned to build a local community centre.

== Formation ==
Exodus as a sound system was formed on 5 June 1992, when the collective hosted a free party near woods in Dunstable, Bedfordshire, promoting it through word of mouth in local pubs. A few days earlier, founding member DJ Hazad had reclaimed some speaker cabinets which had been left in a rubbish bin, enlisting a friend to fit speakers in them. The collective was inspired by Luton dub sound system Gemini High Power.

Exodus raised funds through donations and bar takings, reinvesting the money in equipment. By the time a third party was held on New Year's Eve 1992, it was estimated to have been attended by 10,000 people. The collective named themselves after the track by Bob Marley and the Wailers, also adopting "Movement of Jah People" as their slogan. A founding member of the collective, Glenn Jenkins, would become the most public face of the group, acting as its spokesperson.

== History ==
In summer of 1992, the collective squatted a warehouse which was then evicted in August. Exodus then immediately occupied Long Meadow Farm, which was owned (but left disused) by the Department of Transport. The 17-acre (6.9 ha) farm sat beside the M1 motorway, which was due to be expanded in 2000. The group renovated it extensively, eventually being offered a lease. A working farm was set up and it began to hold open days for local schools. It was renamed Long Meadow Community Free Farm and had goats, sheep, chickens, geese and Vietnamese pot-bellied pigs.

Whilst the Exodus collective attempted to create alternative approaches to social problems and crime, they regularly encountered police raids, injunctions and court appearances. Bedfordshire Police operations against the group were given codenames such as Anagram, Anatomy, Anchovy and Ashanti. On 31 January 1993, Operation Anagram saw a large police raid on Long Meadow Farm by 120 riot police. The thirty-six members of the collective who were at the farm at that moment were arrested and taken to the police station. Since it was Saturday and the day of a planned Exodus rave, a crowd of 4,000 supporters surrounded the police station. Police later claimed that they had found £2,000 worth of ecstasy tablets next to a member of the collective's personal belongings and subsequently charged them with possession. Historian Geoff Eley described this as a "trumped-up drugs charge". The case collapsed at trial with police officers giving contradictory statements.

Bedfordshire County Council voted unanimously in 1995 to support of a public inquiry into the alleged police harassment of Exodus, to be chaired by Michael Mansfield. The inquiry was then stalled by the Home Office. MixMag profiled the collective in 1996, writing: "Exodus is more than just a free party sound system – it's a housing co-op, a city farm, a ray of light in the concrete no-man's land of Luton. They've survived four police operations against them and are currently battling a murder charge, an arson attack and a tractor assault on their rave lorry. This isn't just about dancing, it's about an alternative way of life". The murder charge was later dropped. In an uncommon sequence of events, the trial was first brought forward six months and then the presiding judge (Maurice Drake) agreed to step aside since he was a Freemason and the Exodus collective had for years come into conflict with masons.

By 1998, there had been 11 police raids, 65 arrests and 55 charges. This had resulted in 10 convictions, 9 of which were related to organising unlicensed parties. Further, the police had applied to revoke the licence of a pub in Luton run by Glenn Jenkins's mother, which was frequented by members of the collective. Mrs Jenkins's licence was then confiscated and she was forced to shut down the pub and lay off her staff. In addition, she was ordered to pay the court costs of £13,000. Mrs Jenkins appealed the judgement unsuccessfully and then pursued a judicial review of the case. Lord Justice Dyson ruled in her favour, criticising the judgement of the Appeal Judge Davis as "plainly inadequate" since the reasons to dismiss the appeal had not been made clear. Dyson commented that much more weight should have been given to petition signed by eleven of the pub's twelve neighbours in support of Mrs Jenkins, since the original reason for the revocation of the licence was that the pub had been a local nuisance.

At the beginning of January 1993, Exodus had supported fourteen homeless people who were squatting a long-empty property in Luton called the Oakmore Hotel. Bucket collections were organised at parties in order to help repair the building. After two weeks, the police violently raided the property. Two people were arrested and charged with affray, but at the trial the police were unable to produce the notebooks of thirteen officers involved in the operation and so the charges were dropped. The Oakmore Hotel would be evicted six weeks later in police operation Ashanti, with residents being told they had 30 minutes to leave. Before that time, another property, a derelict old people's home called St Margaret's Hospice, was occupied. Exodus turned the building into a co-op and community centre, which became known as the Housing Action Zone or HAZ Manor. All the occupiers would pay their rent or housing benefit into a pot, and decisions as to how the money was spent (for example, renovating the building) were reached by consensus. HAZ Manor was eventually licensed to the occupiers by the Council.

== Parties ==
Exodus outdoor party taken from Exodus from Babylon, Channel 4 documentary

Raves were held fortnightly by the collective, in the Luton and Dunstable area. The Woodside Industrial Estate became a regular meeting point for revellers awaiting for details of party locations. "Sandpit" parties were held in quarries near Clophill, Bedfordshire, between 1997 and 1999. On other occasions, disused warehouses on the industrial estate would be used for raves such as on New Year's Eve 1999.

Marsh Farm, a suburb of Luton, saw three nights of riots in July 1995. Exodus Collective then organised an out-of-town party on Saturday, 8 July, intending to defuse the tension. The rave was attended by 1,500–2,000 people and the local radio station is reported to have called the collective to tell them that whilst the event was happening there was no rioting at all. In the aftermath of the 2011 England riots, Jenkins later commented in Red Pepper magazine: "From 1995 onwards we proved that youth diversion works better than police oppression. We stopped the Marsh Farm riot by putting on a dance just outside Luton. We wanted to divert the energy and say, c'mon, let's dance, then let's talk, and then let's build".

In 1997, and for the next three years afterwards, Exodus held the Free The Spirit Festival at Longmeadow Farm. The 1999 festival resulted in local councillors calling on the then Home Secretary Jack Straw to intervene. Member of Parliament for Mid Bedfordshire Jonathan Sayeed called on the Secretary of State for the Environment, Transport and the Regions to support a decision to evict Exodus from the farm. However, by the end of 1999, the collective had bought the farm co-operatively with loans from Triodos Bank and the Industrial Common Ownership Movement (ICOM).

Bedfordshire Police launched another operation (codenamed Canterbury), intended to stop a rave happening on the May Day weekend of 1999. At the cost of £25,000, the police used a helicopter and 140 officers to stop vehicles, seize the sound system and arrest three people on suspicion of obstruction. These actions were later declared unlawful in court, so the charges were dropped and the sound system was returned. In summer 2000, the collective achieved their aim of holding a licensed rave. The location was near Ridgmont, Bedfordshire, on land owned by the Marquess of Tavistock. His son, now the Duke of Bedford, had negotiated with Exodus that they could organise raves three times a year on the 135,000 acres of Woburn Estates and commented that "they are very easy to talk to, they talk perfectly good sense and I would recommend someone talking to them".

== Dissolution ==
The raves, the work on the farm... the whole programme. You have to understand that members of the collective are there on condition of loving these principles that we're on. And all of a sudden if those principles aren't there anymore then you can't put your work into it. You can't put your back into it because you would be building something you don't agree with. So anyway Exodus' activities came to a grinding halt and we had meeting after meeting after meeting. People shouting at each other and all of that kind of thing. It was like a divorce. We had our arguments. We had rare-ups. And when we realised we couldn't be a family again, then a fair section of the people couldn't stay there and removed themselves.

— Glenn Jenkins (interviewee), "Whatever happened to the Exodus Collective?" Part One, Squall Magazine

After the fourth Free the Spirit Festival in 2000, the collective went in different directions. Some people continued to stay at HAZ Manor, others at Long Meadow Farm, but the parties stopped. Despite the difficulties, members of the group would persevere in their vision to build a truly "people-led" community and social centre in Marsh Farm, referred to as The Ark. After initially securing funding from the Civic Trust's Regeneration Unit, the application was blocked when Chief Constable Michael O'Byrne raised concerns over the group's support for the legalisation of cannabis. In consequence, the New Deal refused to work with the collective and local Member of Parliament for Luton South Margaret Moran told the press that the New Deal would never support Exodus. This led to the founding of the Marsh Farm Outreach community group, of which Jenkins became chair, with a determination to make the Government's New Deal for Communities benefit the estate.

The Leviticus collective formed out of Exodus and became a dub sound system. The new collective stated "we re-claim disused lands and properties in our town to create our own tribal dances, free festivals, workplaces and homes... building an alternative 'way of life' in our home town of Luton". DJs from the sound system regularly appear at Beautiful Days festival, which is organised by the Levellers.

The Marsh Farm Outreach community group continued to work towards the founding of a community enterprise centre on the site of a former factory. In 2011, it opened its doors and is known as Marsh Farm Futures House.

== In popular culture ==
- Exodus were featured in Channel 4 documentaries Exodus Movement of Jah People (1995) and Exodus From Babylon (1997).
- In a 1999 episode of BBC2's Living with the Enemy, a Young Conservative went to stay with Exodus and unsuccessfully reported the collective to the police for smoking cannabis.

== See also ==
- DiY Sound System
- Spiral Tribe
