= Sandwell District =

British techno record label (2002–2011)

- Founded: 2002
- Founder: Regis, Female
- Defunct: 2011
- Genre: Techno
- Country of origin: England, United States

Sandwell District was a record label and multinational collective of techno DJs and producers that operated between 2002 and 2011. Their sound has been highly influential across the following generation of techno musicians, and has informed a major shift in world techno. By the time the collective announced its "glorious death" in 2012, the American Billboard magazine wrote that "Sandwell District's influence on underground techno can hardly be overstated."

Sandwell District was established as a record label in 2002 by Regis (Karl O'Connor) and Female (Peter Sutton) as an extension of their Downwards Records label, which had been instrumental in shaping techno's Birmingham sound in the early 1990s. The label was revived in 2004 and from 2005 increasingly incorporated the artistic input of the New York City–based Function (David Sumner) and the Los Angeles–based Silent Servant (Juan Mendez). Initially releasing records under their own identities, as the label's success grew, it came to be seen increasingly as a collective entity, releasing tracks and albums anonymously partly in revolt against the increasingly celebrity-oriented DJ culture of the time, culminating in its 2010 collective album Feed Forward.
