= Breaking the Frame =

Studio album by Surgeon
- Released: 2011
- Genre: Techno
- Length: 55:33
- Label: Dynamic Tension
- Producer: Anthony Child

Surgeon chronology
Body Request (2000)	Breaking the Frame (2011)	From Farthest Known Objects (2016)

Breaking the Frame is a studio album by English record producer Anthony Child under the pseudonym Surgeon. It was released in 2011 through Dynamic Tension Records.

== Background ==
Breaking the Frame is Surgeon's first studio album since Body Request (2000). In an interview, he explained that the album "was very influenced by spiritually inspired music by people like Alice Coltrane, Eliane Radigue and Terry Riley, La Monte Young, that kind of thing."

== Critical reception ==
Professional ratings
Review scores
Source	Rating
Fact	4/5 stars
Pitchfork	7.2/10
Resident Advisor	4.0/5

Michaelangelo Matos of Resident Advisor commented that "Each of these nine tracks is stark and enormous." He added, "Straight off, they announce themselves, and while each has a good amount of detail that you don't even have to listen very closely to notice, what's striking about them all is that those strong first impressions remain true the entire time each track plays." Tim Finney of Pitchfork stated, "It's typical on an album whose structures throw shadows of bleak, inhuman grandeur: Enormity, rather than velocity, defines the best work on Breaking the Frame, and there's a masochistic pleasure in being made to feel very small as you lose yourself on the dancefloor."

=== Accolades ===
Year-end lists for Breaking the Frame
Publication	List	Rank	Ref.
Fact	The 50 Best Albums of 2011	38	
PopMatters	The 10 Best Electronic Albums of 2011	5	

== Track listing ==
All tracks are written by Anthony Child..

Breaking the Frame track listing
No.	Title	Length
1.	"Dark Matter"	3:05
2.	"Transparent Radiation"	6:47
3.	"Remover of Darkness"	6:44
4.	"The Power of Doubt"	7:45
5.	"Radiance"	6:40
6.	"Presence"	6:46
7.	"We Are All Already Here"	5:41
8.	"Those Who Do Not"	7:51
9.	"Not-Two"	4:11
Total length:		55:33

== Personnel ==
Credits adapted from liner notes.

- Anthony Child – production
- Trudy Creen – artwork, typography
