= Freek Funk =

Studio album by Luke Slater
- Released: 20 October 1997
- Genre: Techno
- Length: 74:54
- Label: Novamute
- Producer: Luke Slater

Luke Slater chronology
The Drone Sector (1997)	Freek Funk (1997)	Wireless (1999)

Singles from Freek Funk
- 1. "Freek Funk" Released: 1997

Freek Funk is a studio album by British techno producer Luke Slater, released in October 1997 by Novamute Records as his first album for the label and his first for a major label. The album was among Slater's most personal works to date, and his intention for the album was to record music that went beyond the four-to-the-floor nature of techno and push the genre's barriers, resulting in an eclectic, minimal album that also incorporates funk, acid techno and electro styles. The album varies in tone, with aggressive techno tracks and softer, less upbeat material.

The album was promoted by the single "Freek Funk", and was also Slater's first release in the United States. The producer supported the record with a live tour. Upon release, Freek Funk received critical acclaim and helped popularise Slater's music. It went on to influence many techno and breakbeat producers, and is today hailed as an ambitious album. In 2017, Mixmag named it the fifth greatest techno album of the 1990s.

== Background and production ==
Throughout the 1990s, Slater built up a reputation as an influential British techno producer, taking influence from Detroit techno in particular and releasing material under the name Planetary Assault Systems. In 1996, he signed to Peacefrog Records for the second time in his career, on which he released the first Planetary Assault Systems album, The Electric Funk Machine (1997), which featured alterations in suctioned percussion and bass. The follow-up album The Drone Sector was also released by Peacefrog Records later that year.

Following these releases, Slater signed to NovaMute Records, a techno label owned by Mute Records home to fellow producers Speedy J and Richie Hawtin. While on the label, Slater began releasing his most personal work. His first album for the label, and first major label record, Freek Funk was written and produced by Slater, with the "delicious talents" of Hulal aiding the recording. Slater's plan for Freek Funk was to write music that was not necessarily techno of a four-to-the-floor nature, and as a result "wrote the tracks I wanted and it ended up quite varied", as he told an interviewer. He elaborated: "I didn't want to do what people expected, but on the other hand I didn't want to purposefully not do it. I might be born of perversion but the album's not."

== Composition ==
Freek Funk is a sleek and lush album, and continues Slater's Detroit-influenced techno sound, but is more experimental, covering a variety of styles including abrasive techno, string-laden house and ambient music reminiscent of film scores. The album also features styles of electronic funk and acid techno, and was referred to by writer Andy Hermann as a fusion of techno, funk and electro. The NME felt the album was "sinister mechanical soul" music that was steeped in "traditional techno manoeuvres", while Emma Morgan of Select noted that the "vast and varied affair" alternates between "twinkling soundscapes and tinny floorfillers". Dave Turner of Mixmag felt the album was a collection of aggressive techno tracks which is nonetheless relieved with the inclusion of the calmer tracks "Zebediah" and "Walking the Line". Writer Tim Haslett noted Slater's "kicked-drummed minimalism" sound and felt he "[occupied] techno's basic structures and [turned] them inside-out to make them fit his design". The album's sixteen tracks are characterised by their organic percussion sounds.

Throughout the album are four numbered "Score" tracks which Morgan compared to Vangelis' Blade Runner soundtrack. The opening track "Purely" announces the album's "tough techno" sound from its first kick. "Origin" is an intense rave track dominated by bleep sounds. "Score Two" features a cinematic atmosphere, whereas the following track "Are You There" is an electro track, with an "Egyptian boom-bap" style that writer Aaron M. Gonsher felt revealed Slater's "vocoded weirdness". "Engine One" is a relentless, intense techno piece, while the title track is a hypnotic and complex composition, and was described by Morgan as reminiscent of "Talking Heads' 'Once in a Lifetime' playing from the Voyager probe in place of Bach's 'Brandenburg Concerto No. 2'." It opens with choir samples and a metallic keyboard sequence before the serene mood is interrupted by a looped, distorted Roland TR-808 kick drum sound. Guitar noise soon appears, albeit put through many filters and effect pedals so that the original instrument is almost unrecognisable.

"Zebediah" is a trip hop-styled track with dub music influences, and is reminiscent of the "spiritual bliss" of Orbital. "Bless Bless" features a distressed funk sound, and incorporates rattly but rigid percussion, a drifting bassline and swirly sample bed. By contrast, following track "Filter 2" features an industrial "sound wall" style, and is similar to "Option" in its "ravey whirlpool" style. "Score Four (Black Cloud Over Zin Vortex)" is characterised by spacey textures and "fraught atmospheres" similar to "Zebediah". "Time Dancer" has been described as a "peak-time head spinner". The album is closed by the abstract hip-hop of "Walking the Line".

== Release and reception ==
Professional ratings
Review scores
Source	Rating
AllMusic	4.5/5 stars
Muzik	10/10
NME	8/10
Select	4/5

Freek Funk was released by NovaMute on 20 October 1997. In the United States, where NovaMute also released the album, it was Slater's first release, although he had built up a following among "import fiends" in the country. The title track was released as the album's first single. It contained the B-side "Stomp", a techno track incorporating broken beats. Upon release, Freek Funk was critically acclaimed, and according to writer Justin Kleinfeld, it put Slater "on top of the electronic music circuit". Dave Hoffman of PopMatters reflected that the album "was popular on dancefloors all over the world". The album also was a relative commercial success in that it topped the dance charts.

In a favourable review, Emma Morgan of Select wrote: "As palatable to techno-heads as to anyone kicked into touch by Daft Punk's recent triumphs, Freek Funk is a momentarily unifying force as dance music continues to divide and regenerate at light speed." Option called the album "an enjoyable collection. It sputters by smoothly and coherently, a 75-minute set of logical progressions." They praised Slater for creating a unified album "suitable for solitary consumption", feeling this was unlike many techno producers who the writer felt would make "halfhearted" albums instead. Praise was given to the title track for being intricate without seeming "fussy or overwrought", and for "Bless Bless" for being "outstanding". Vincent Brunner of Les Inrockuptibles felt that the album is "as much for dancers as for dreamers, provided they do not have short breath and low vision". He complimented the variety of styles and the music's "human" feel, and felt that Slater was "moving forward", describing the record as "a veritable kaleidoscope of techno". Andy Crysell of NME hailed the album for reminding listeners of techno's "fantastical" sound.

In their year-end lists of the best albums of 1997, Muzik ranked the album 18th, Nojesguiden ranked it 19th, and OOR ranked it 33rd. Tim Haslett of CMJ New Music Monthly wrote in December 1997 that Freek Funk was a "treat" and commented: "No wonder he counts people like Robert Hood and Carl Craig among his followers." He felt the album's "effect" was "similar to that of reaching a difficulty level in a video game that the game's designers hadn't planned for." Among retrospective reviews, John Bush of AllMusic felt that the album was Slater's most precise and emotional album to date, while also noting its musical experimentation and variety. He concluded that Slater was "[o]ne of the few British producers who seem to realize that interesting sounds aren't quite as important as investing the music with spirit", and described Freek Funk as "one of the best techno LPs of the year". Resident Advisor felt the record consolidated on previous Slater productions, such as the Al Sage collaboration "Freebase" and "important releases" released under the pseudonyms Planetary Assault System and Clementine.

== Legacy ==
"Slater first became known for his work as Planetary Assault Systems on the Peacefrog imprint in the early nineties, bringing an aggressive edge and electronic swagger to the Detroit sound, but it was his long-player Freek Funk (1997) under his own name which crossed over to global dancefloors with its blend of deep acid and electronic funk."

—Resident Advisor

Following the album's release, Slater discussed playing the album live, and announced to Select that he was going to perform a range of songs from the album and other sources on its accompanying tour. Since its release, Freek Funk has gone on to be considered an influential album; Resident Advisor wrote that the album made an immediate, heavy impact on the techno and breakbeat scenes, and felt that it inspired "the next generation of electro-tinged breaks and nu-skool techno". Slater was surprised by the album's influence, saying: "It was a great feeling, to be honest. I was trying to push the barriers of the techno thing. I was surprised." Paul Cooper of Pitchfork felt the album was "ambitious and innovative".

In 1999, French magazine Trax included the album in their unordered list of "The 50 Best Techno Albums 1989-1999", while in 2017, Mixmag ranked the album at number 5 in their list of "The 10 best 90s techno albums". They said Slater delivered an "epic" album where "every track is potent to keep listeners locked in", and felt that the record "sounds like an invasion from an off-world colony of dance freaks." That same year, they also included the album on a list of 20 notable electronic albums released in 1997, and told listeners to "revisit Freek Funk to remind yourself of the magic [Slater] conjured up 20 years ago." Writer Paul Morley included the album in a list of 100 great albums "that map out the universe as it is because of Kraftwerk".

== Track listing ==
All songs written by Luke Slater

1. "Purely" – 8:02
2. "Score One" – 1:46
3. "Origin" – 3:14
4. "Score Two" – 2:06
5. "Are You There?" – 4:52
6. "Score Two (Message from Hulal)" – 2:20
7. "Engine One" – 6:45
8. "Freek Funk" – 7:51
9. "Zebediah" – 6:57
10. "Bless Bless" – 4:21
11. "Filter 2" – 6:16
12. "Time Dancer" – 6:15
13. "Score Four (Black Cloud Over Zin Vortex)" – 1:06
14. "Love" – 6:14
15. "Black Cloud (Epilogue)" – 1:29
16. "Walking the Cloud" – 5:20

== Personnel ==
- Luke Slater – production, writing
- Hulal – recording
- House – design
- Spiros Politis – photography
