= Blood of Heroes =

Blood of Heroes may refer to:

- The Blood of Heroes, a 1989 post-apocalyptic film directed by David Webb Peoples
- Blood of Heroes (EP), a 2002 EP by Polish black metal band Graveland
- The Blood of Heroes (band), a Brooklyn New York alternative rock group
- Blood of Heroes (role-playing game), a superhero role-playing game by Pulsar Games
- Blood of Heroes, a song by the american thrash-metal band Megadeth on the album Youthanasia of 1994
