= Worship Is the Cleansing of the Imagination =

Studio album (split) by JK Flesh & Prurient
- Released: December 11, 2012
- Genre: Industrial; noise
- Length: 34:05; 54:19 (Japanese release)
- Label: Hydra Head (HH666–236)

JK Flesh chronology
Posthuman (2012)	Worship Is the Cleansing of the Imagination (2012)	Nothing Is Free (2015)

Prurient chronology
Wrapped in the Flame of Illusion, Masked in the Clay of Behavior (2012)	Worship Is the Cleansing of the Imagination (2012)	Through the Window (2013)

Worship Is the Cleansing of the Imagination is a split album between experimental musicians Dominick Fernow under the pseudonym Prurient and Justin Broadrick (of Godflesh and Jesu) under the pseudonym JK Flesh. Released on vinyl on December 11, 2012, Worship Is the Cleansing of the Imagination was the final release of new material by Hydra Head Records, the label founded by former Isis member Aaron Turner, during its existence as a full-time label.

== Critical reception ==
Professional ratings
Review scores
Source	Rating
Fact	4/5 stars
Pitchfork	8/10 stars

Worship Is the Cleansing of the Imagination received positive reviews. Maya Kalev of Fact wrote that the album was a triumphal and fitting end to the Hydra Head label. Pitchfork writer Grayson Currin said, "These six tracks provide heaviness in a half-dozen different ways, a functional and fitting elegy for an imprint that achieved that mission with enviable consistency."

== Track listing ==
All music is composed by JK Flesh.

No.	Title	Length
1.	"Fear of Fear"	5:20
2.	"Deceiver"	5:35
3.	"Obedient Automaton"	5:26
Total length:		16:21

All music is composed by Prurient.

No.	Title	Length
4.	"Chosen Books"	5:52
5.	"Entering the Water"	4:34
6.	"I Understand You"	7:18
Total length:		17:44 (34:05)

Digital and Japanese bonus tracks
No.	Title	Writer	Length
7.	"Mundanity of Suspended Anxiety" (Prurient remix)	Aaron Turner	7:00
8.	"JK Flesh Merges Prurient 1"		5:22
9.	"JK Flesh Merges Prurient 2"		7:52
Total length:			20:14 (54:19)

=== Notes ===
- The US digital release of Worship Is the Cleansing of the Imagination puts track 7 as track 9 and displaces the others up.
