= New Horizon (JK Flesh album) =

Studio album by JK Flesh
- Released: 28 September 2018
- Studio: Avalanche Studios
- Genre: Techno
- Length: 51:02
- Label: Electric Deluxe
- Producer: Justin Broadrick

JK Flesh chronology
| Wasplike (2018) | New Horizon (2018) |

New Horizon is the third studio album by JK Flesh, a moniker of English musician Justin Broadrick. It was released digitally and on vinyl on 28 September 2018 through the label Electric Deluxe under the designation EDLX.058. The album was preceded by streams of the tracks "Different Species" and "External Transmission Stage" in June and August 2018 respectively.

== Production ==
Like the JK Flesh releases that precede it, New Horizon continues into minimal techno territory tinted by Justin Broadrick's decades creating metal music. Musically, the album is dark and textured, with pulsing beats and Broadrick's typically gloomy atmosphere. The sound is informed by dub music. About the album's deliberately stark style, Broadrick said:

I actually reduce things down so they sound more like a machine for me, not like a musical instrument. It’s somewhat trying to remove myself from the music and remove all shred of humanity.

Broadrick spent a week in early 2017 recording hundreds of music jam pieces at Avalanche Studios in North Wales which he then edited and mixed over a period of a month "using a combination of hardware and industrial gear, including tape loops and echo pedals". About the process, he said "It was very hands-on and very concise. I don’t generally spend even an hour on one thing—maybe 10 minutes and I’m like, ‘Right, I’ve said everything I need to say. On to the next one.’" The rhythms on the album average between 120 and 135 beats per minute.

My bottom line is often misery of some context. The new JK Flesh is very much about textures that become very earthy, burly, and somewhat hellish.

== Reception ==
Professional ratings
Review scores
| Source | Rating |
|---|---|
| The Letter | 8/10 |
| Resident Advisor | 4.2/5 |

Andrew Ryce of Resident Advisor gave New Horizon a positive review, praising its ominous mood and its "push-and-pull between aggression and restraint". The Letter's Blair Millen called the album "cohesive, well sequenced and a thoroughly thrilling listen". Reviewing the album for Noisey's Stream of the Crop selection, Colin Joyce wrote, "It’s gross, it’s humid, but most importantly, it’s alive." Joyce also described the album as "a chilling and kinetic record of belt-sander techno that’s—to my ears—his defining work as JK Flesh and one of the finest albums he’s put out under any moniker". The Quietus singled out "External Transmission Stage" as one of their favorite songs of the year.

=== Accolades ===
| Year | Publication | Country | Accolade | Rank | Ref. |
|---|---|---|---|---|---|
| 2018 | Resident Advisor | United Kingdom | "2018's Best Albums" | * | |
"*" denotes an unordered list.

== Track listing ==
All music is composed by Justin Broadrick

| No. | Title | Length |
|---|---|---|
| 1. | "Different Species" | 7:05 |
| 2. | "Super Human" | 6:26 |
| 3. | "External Transmission Stage" | 6:25 |
| 4. | "Genetics" | 6:42 |
| 5. | "Earlier Form of Life" | 5:44 |
| 6. | "Macromolecules" | 5:52 |
| 7. | "The Next Stage" | 6:09 |
| 8. | "Homo Sapiens" | 6:39 |
| Total length: | | 51:02 |

== Personnel ==
Credits adapted from New Horizon liner notes

- Justin Broadrick – instruments, production
