= The KVB =

British post-punk duo

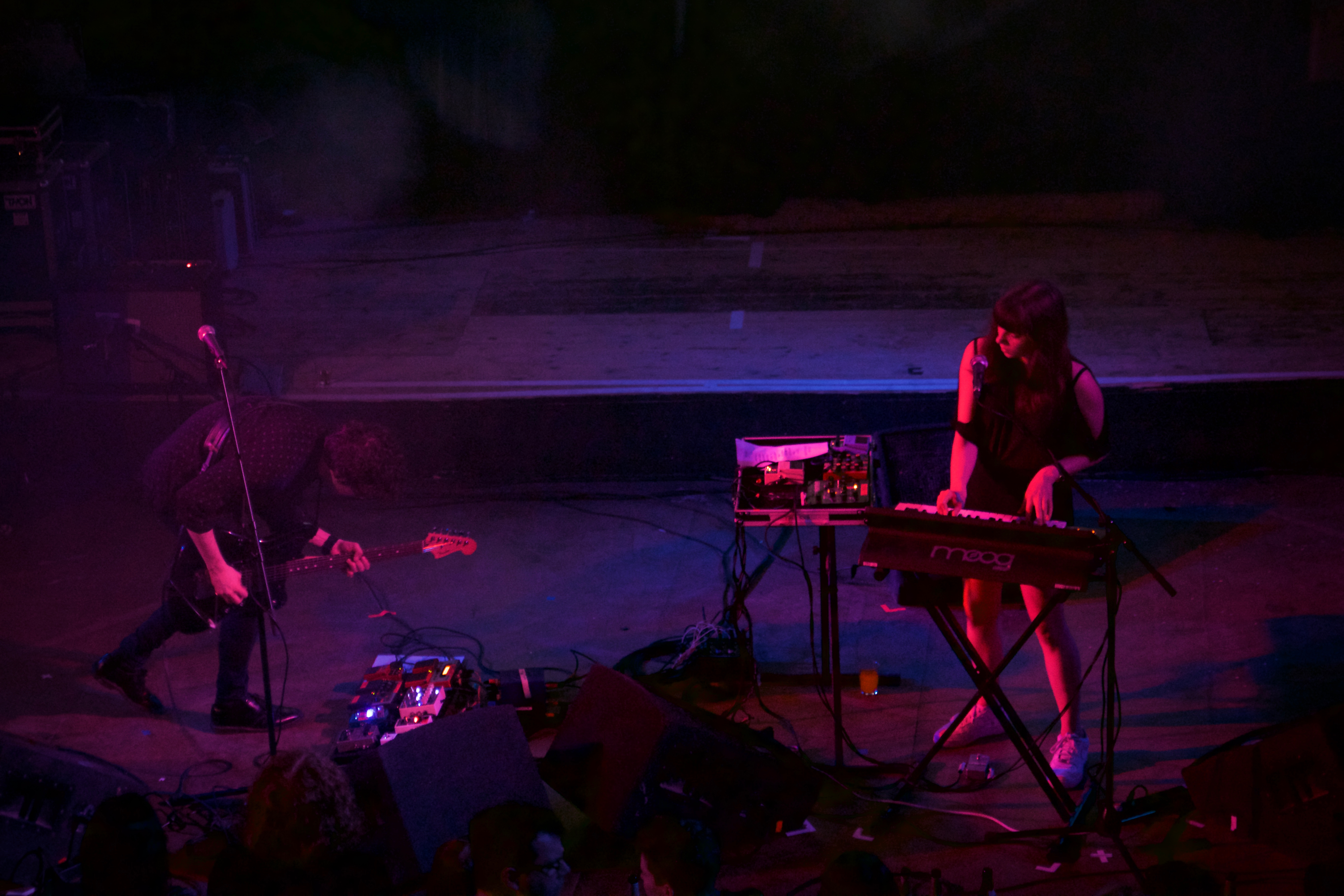

Background information
- Origin: London, England
- Genres: Post-punk; dark wave; shoegaze
- Years active: 2010–present
- Labels: Invada Records; A Records; Cititrax; Minimal Wave; Clan Destine; Downwards
- Members: Nicholas Wood, Kat Day
- Website: thekvb.co.uk

The KVB is a British post-punk duo originally formed in London in 2010 by Nicholas Wood and Kat Day. The KVB's sound has been described as a combination of electronic, psychedelic, post-punk and shoegaze. The visual element of the band is created by Kat Day, who studied fine art at Goldsmiths, University of London.

== Biography ==
Originally starting in 2010 as the solo recording project of then Southampton-based musician Nicholas Wood, The KVB released a number of demos online and limited edition cassettes, before gaining the attention of techno label Downwards for the release of the EP Into the Night in June 2011.

Nicholas was joined by Kat Day on synthesizers and visuals in late 2011, whilst she was studying fine art at Goldsmiths, University of London, to form a duo. Their influences included Suicide, Spacemen 3 and OMD. The band played their first live concert together in London at The Shacklewell Arms in December of that year. Their first full-length album, Always Then, was released in February 2012 on Clan Destine Records and coincided with their first European tour, as well as support dates in the UK with The Soft Moon, Singapore Sling (band) and Tamaryn.

To coincide with the A Records release, The KVB supported The Brian Jonestown Massacre on their tour of Australia that year. 2013 also saw The KVB support Loop on their UK reunion tour and play at the Loop-curated ATP Festival at Camber Sands.

The duo recorded their next release, 2014's EP Out of Body at the Berlin studio of Anton Newcombe. Live drums on this release were contributed by Joe Dilworth, formerly of Stereolab.

2015 saw the band perform at the Primavera Sound festivals in Barcelona & Porto.

In 2017, The KVB released the EP, Fixation / White Walls.

On 26 November 2021, the band released their sixth album, Unity.

In January 2023 they supported Editors on their UK & Ireland tour and remixed one of their songs. In May, they released Artefacts (Reimaginings From The Original Psychedelic Era), an album containing covers of tracks from classic psychedelic rock bands including The 13th Floor Elevators, The Castaways, Status Quo or The Who, referencing a seminal compilation of the genre (Nuggets: Original Artyfacts from the First Psychedelic Era, 1965–1968) with the title. Early 2024 they announced the April release of their new album, Tremors and a UK & Europe our for the following month.

In 2024, the KVB released a music video for Tremors which featured in Brooklyn Vegan the video gained 42,000 views on YouTube in the first 2 years of its release.

The KVB have been touring Europe/UK in April and May 2024

== Discography ==
=== Studio albums ===
- Always Then (2012, Clan Destine Records)
- Immaterial Visions (2013, Cititrax)
- Minus One (2013, A Records)
- Mirror Being (2015, Invada Records)
- Of Desire (2016, Invada Records)
- Only Now Forever (2018, Invada Records)
- Live At La Cigale (2020, Invada Records)
- Unity (2021, Invada Records)
- Tremors (2024, Invada Records)

=== EPs ===
- Into The Night (2011, Downwards Records)
- Out Of Body (2014, A Records)
- Fixation / White Walls (2017, Invada Records)
