= Suicide Estate =

EP by JK Flesh
- Released: February 27, 2016 (limited cassette); February 20, 2017 (digital); October 20, 2017 (CD)
- Studio: Avalanche Studios
- Genre: Techno; industrial
- Length: 26:01 (original cassette); 51:29 (double cassette / double LP / CD); 57:22 (digital)
- Label: Hospital Productions; Avalanche Recordings
- Producer: Justin Broadrick

JK Flesh chronology
Nothing Is Free (2015)	Suicide Estate (00000000)	Rise Above (2016)

Hospital Productions reissue cover
- Released in 2017

Suicide Estate or Suicide Estate Antibiotic Armageddon is an EP by JK Flesh, a moniker of English musician Justin Broadrick, and was originally released on February 27, 2016 through Hospital Productions as a cassette. The EP has been rereleased numerous times in different formats, culminating in a widespread digital release in February 2017, and a double LP in November 2017. Each edition features a different tracklist.

== Release history ==
Suicide Estate was originally released on February 27, 2016 as a single 4-track cassette on Dominick Fernow's record label, Hospital Productions. This version was limited to 44 copies. A double cassette version with new artwork was released on the same record label in April 2016. This version was limited to 66 copies.

On February 20, 2017, nearly a year after the EP's original release, a revised version known as Suicide Estate Antibiotic Armaggeddon was released digitally through Justin Broadrick's own record label, Avalanche Recordings. This edition was remastered and includes three new or remixed tracks. On November 1, 2017, another version of the EP was released again under the title Suicide Estate and again through Hospital Productions. This version is a double LP, a blue double LP limited to 250 copies, and a CD. It features different artwork than the other releases.

== Track listing ==
All music is composed by Justin Broadrick.

Suicide Estate original 2016 cassette release
No.	Title	Length
1.	"Bayley Tower"	6:25
2.	"Stoneycroft Tower"	7:00
3.	"Bromford Bridge Estate"	6:23
4.	"Holbrook Tower"	6:13
Total length:		26:01

Suicide Estate Antibiotic Armageddon 2017 digital release
No.	Title	Length
1.	"Bayley Tower" (Remix)	5:53
2.	"Bayley Tower" (New Mix)	6:16
3.	"Tamiflu"	6:41
4.	"Stoneycroft Tower"	6:56
5.	"Holbrook Tower"	6:10
6.	"Squalene" (New Mix)	6:15
7.	"Ethylene Glycol"	6:02
8.	"Bromford Bridge Estate"	6:06
9.	"Thimerosal"	7:03
Total length:		57:22

Suicide Estate 2017 CD / 2xLP release
No.	Title	Length
1.	"Bayley Tower" (New Mix)	6:16
2.	"Tamiflu"	6:41
3.	"Stoneycroft Tower"	6:56
4.	"Holbrook Tower"	6:10
5.	"Squalene" (New Mix)	6:15
6.	"Ethylene Glycol"	6:02
7.	"Bromford Bridge Estate"	6:06
8.	"Thimerosal"	7:03
Total length:		51:29

2016 double cassette release, cassette 1 (Suicide Estate)
No.	Title	Length
1.	"Bayley Tower"	6:20
2.	"Stoneycroft Tower"	6:52
3.	"Bromford Bridge Estate"	6:08
4.	"Holbrook Tower"	6:06
Total length:		25:26

2016 double cassette release, cassette 2 (Antibiotic Armageddon)
No.	Title	Length
5.	"Thimerosal"	7:06
6.	"Ethylene Glycol"	6:00
7.	"Tamiflu"	6:44
8.	"Squalene"	6:08
Total length:		25:58 (51:24)

== Personnel ==
- Justin Broadrick – instruments, production
