= Birmingham sound =

Subgenre of techno music

- Stylistic origins: Techno
- Cultural origins: Early 1990s, Birmingham, England

The Birmingham sound is a subgenre of techno that emerged in Birmingham, England in the early 1990s. It is most commonly associated with the city's House of God club night, the Downwards Records label, and the local DJs and producers Regis, Surgeon and Female. It is characterised by a hard, fast and uncompromising style that strips the music of the bassline funk that characterised the techno of Detroit and Berlin, leaving only "huge slabs of unrelentingly unchanging minimalism".

The Birmingham sound marked a turning point in the development of techno and its influence can be heard throughout the Berlin techno of the Berghain and Ostgut Ton. It also formed the starting point for Regis and Female's later Sandwell District project.
