= DiY Sound System =

DiY Sound System, also known as the DiY Collective, was a British house music sound system that began operating in 1990. The collective itself was formed in Nottingham in 1989 by Harry Harrison, Rick "Digs" Down, Simon "DK" Smith, and Pete "Woosh" Birch. The group later "divided their activities between free parties and legal club nights, acting as a bridge between counter-culture and the mainstream".

== History ==
=== 1990s ===
The DiY Collective was co-founded by Harry Harrison, Rick "Digs" Down, Simon "DK" Smith and Pete "Woosh" Birch in Nottingham as a reaction against the growing commercialisation of pay parties, especially Orbital raves such as Biology and Sunrise. DiY's standpoint came from a merging of anarchist principles and a history of attending both free festivals and clubs such as the Haçienda. They wished to form a cohesive, collective, political front against the prevailing anti-rave legislation that was beginning to come into force at that time. This became more marked around the time of the Criminal Justice and Public Order Act 1994, with DiY playing a key role in the illegal rave at Castlemorton Common Festival prior to the Bill in May 1992. After hooking up with a group of progressive travellers at the 1990 Glastonbury Festival, they began to throw a constant stream of illegal, outdoor parties (often at travellers' sites, quarries and disused airfields) all over the country for many years. Simon Reynolds wrote that DiY threw "free parties at abandoned airfields or on hilltops, drawing a mixed crowd of urban ravers and crusty road warriors".

On 23 November 1989 at The Garage in Nottingham, there was a birthday party for Harry. Pete Birch later described it as the first club night leading to the formation of DiY, though the collective did not operate as a sound system until 1990. Their "Bounce" began at Venus, Nottingham in February 1991 and ran for five years at various clubs, including nights at the Dance Factory. Bounce also at one point had a network of nights in Liverpool, Manchester, Hull, Sheffield, Bristol, Birmingham, Exeter and Bath.

The Strictly 4 Groovers label put out its first release by Alabama 3 in 1992, followed by records from members of the DiY Collective, as well local artists including Atjazz, Rhythm Plate and Charles Webster.

== Legacy ==
DiY continue to hold occasional free parties, typically to celebrate a milestone date—on 19 September 2009, DiY celebrated their 20th birthday with a free party near their home town of Nottingham, and on 23 August 2014, their 25th birthday with a free party held in a field in Leicestershire.

On 3 October 2020, it was announced that Pete Birch (Woosh) had died from cancer.

Harry Harrison released a biographical history of DiY, Dreaming In Yellow in 2022.

Simon DK died on 6 July 2023, age 60.

Digs continues to DJ as Grace Sands.

== See also ==
- Exodus Collective
- Free party
- Spiral Tribe
- Teknival
