= Spiral Tribe =

Free party sound system

Background information
- Origin: London, England
- Genres: Free tekno, breakbeat hardcore
- Years active: 1990–present
- Labels: Network 23, Big Life Records, Rabbit City, Force Inc, LabWorks
- Website: sp23.org

Spiral Tribe is an arts collective and free party sound system formed in 1990. It organised free parties, festivals and raves in the UK and later Europe in the 1990s. Spiral Tribe was in the Castlemorton Common Festival, and members have released music on labels such as Network 23 and Big Life Records. The sound system combined pagan beliefs with New Age traveller culture and rave to form teknivals. After a hiatus, the collective reformed as SP23 in 2011 and continues to organise events.

== Early history ==
Spiral Tribe formed as a sound system in 1990, organising free parties in the UK. Between 1990 and 1992, the collective organised or were involved in over 30 free parties, raves, and festivals in indoor and outdoor locations. The three founding members of Spiral Tribe/SP23 were Mark Harrison, Debbie Griffith and Simone Feeney. According to Harrison, the name Spiral Tribe came to him when he was at work, staring at a poster of the interconnecting spirals in an ammonite shell. The number 23, which is associated with Spiral Tribe, was introduced by Harrison. Despite allusions to the number having been used by Psychic TV and Robert Anton Wilson, he stated that it "had nothing to do with any pre-existing individual, group or subculture".

== Selected parties ==
On New Year's Eve 1991, Spiral Tribe held a rave at the then derelict Roundhouse venue in Camden, London, which lasted for a week. The building had previously been used for an All Night Rave in the 1960s. Spiral Tribe organised a warehouse rave in Acton Lane, west London on 19 April 1992 (Easter Sunday). The Metropolitan Police decided to shut down the party and since the doors were barricaded, the Territorial Support Group drove a JCB through a wall to enter the party.

In May 1992, the free party circuit moved up a gear and attendances increased heavily. At the beginning of the month, Spiral Tribe joined DiY Sound System and Circus Warp at Lechlade, Gloucestershire. This would reach its peak by the end of May with the Castlemorton Common Festival which became a huge party as an unintended consequence of the police preventing New Age travellers heading for the annual Avon Free Festival. Thirteen members of Spiral Tribe were arrested immediately after the event and subsequently charged with public order offences. Their trial became one of the longest-running and most expensive cases in British legal history, lasting four months and costing the UK £4 million. Spiral Tribe first used the slogan "Make some fucking noise" on T-shirts which they wore in the courtroom. The judge ordered them to remove these garments. However, when the female defendants revealed that they wore nothing underneath their T-shirts, the judge reversed his instructions, something quite rare in UK courts. Regarding Castlemorton, Nigel South states that "the adverse publicity attending the event laid the groundwork for the Criminal Justice Act 1994". Police pressure on the collective was increasing. The week after Castlemorton, Spiral Tribe tried to put on a rave but prospective five venues were all shut down. It then organised a rave at Canada Square beside the then half-built Canary Wharf tower in June 1992, which was attended by 1,000 before being stopped.

After participants were eventually acquitted of all charges relating to Castlemorton in March 1993, half of the group moved to Europe shortly afterwards, doing parties in the Netherlands, Germany and Austria. In Berlin, Spiral Tribe made their base at Kunsthaus Tacheles with the Mutoid Waste Company.

Over the next few years, the collective organised parties and teknivals throughout Europe, then it slowly dispersed with some members taking up residence in Germany and the Netherlands and releasing work on Labworks and many other techno labels. Individual members of the collective joined other sound systems such as Facom Unit, Sound Conspiracy and Total Resistance. Spiral Tribe also toured the USA in the late 1990s.

== Legacy ==
Spiral Tribe became an influential pioneer of the teknival and free party scene in western Europe and north America. It forged a new techno-punk identity out of rave and New Age traveller culture, which brought in pagan influences. Members of the collective promoted the use of psychedelic drugs such as LSD and psilocybin. The music of Spiral Tribe inspired other sound systems such as Desert Storm, Teknocrates, Nomades, OQP and Psychiatrik. Low and Barnett opine in Spaces of Democracy that "Spiral Tribe, with their free and inclusive parties, succeeded in constituting an alternative public space, rather than just a secret one". Creating temporary autonomous zones through squatting venues, the collective could set the volume as high as it wanted and drug use was not restricted.

The DVD World Traveller Adventures (named after the Spiral Tribe track "World Traveller Adventurer") includes films about Spiral Tribe and other sound systems, tracking how they organised parties, as well as overground journeys. In 2019, Seana Gavin put on an exhibition in Paris about the legacy of Spiral Tribe and then released a book called Spiralled. A documentary entitled Free Party: A Folk History was announced in 2021 which included interviews with members of Spiral Tribe.

== 2011 reformation ==
In 2011, several of the original members of Spiral Tribe reformed as SP23, a creative collective involved in a number of grassroots and community projects as well as still organising parties. A return to the UK party was held in London in April 2013 at Village Underground club; the lineup was Crystal Distortion, 69DB, Ixindamix, Jeff23, Meltdown Mickey, the Bad Girlz and Sirius. Since then, SP23 have hosted across Europe. Members of SP23 are Mark (a.k.a. Stray Wayward), Debbie (a.k.a. Feenix13), David (a.k.a. Dave808), Simone (a.k.a. Sim Simmer), Meltdown Mickey, Simon (a.k.a. Crystal Distortion), Sebastian (a.k.a. 69db), Ixindamix, Jeff 23, Max Volume and Charlie Kane. Jeff 23 and Simone formed the group Artists in Action in order to raise money to support refugees by releasing compilation albums.

== Discography ==
In 1992, some members of the collective signed to the major label Big Life Records, as a result of the publicity generated from their involvement in the organisation of the Castlemorton Common Festival. Three EPs were released with them enjoying short crossover success with Forward the Revolution and Breach the Peace, an album Tekno Terra, as well as a compilation. The track "Breach the Peace" included samples of police officers talking about Castlemorton.

Members of Spiral Tribe also released records on their own label Network 23. In 1997, Techno Import, a French commercial distributor, compiled a CD entitled Spiral Tribe: The Sound of Teknival. The CD was released without any consent from members of Spiral Tribe, was advertised on television and sold an estimated 30,000 copies.

=== Albums ===
- Tekno Terra (Big Life Records, 1993)

=== Compilations ===
- Spiral Tribe Sound System (The Album) (Big Life, 1993)

=== Selected singles/EPs ===
- U Make Me Feel So Good (self-released, 1992)
- Spiral Tribe EP (a.k.a. Breach the Peace) (Big Life, 1992)
- Spiral Tribe EP 2 (a.k.a. Forward the Revolution) (Big Life, 1992)
- SP 23 (Rabbit City, 1992)
- Sirius 23 (Big Life, 1993)
- Verdict Not Guilty EP (a.k.a. Black Plastik) (self-released, 1992)
- Don't Take the Piss (Network 23, 1994)
- Definitely Taking Drugs (Network 23, 1994)
- Expekt the Unxpekted (Network 23, 1994)
- This Is Trance (Force Inc, 1994)
- Panasonic (Network 23, 1994)
- Probably Taking Drugs (Network 23, 1994)
- LSP 23 (Network 23, 1994)
- Spiral Tribe 1 (Network 23, 1994)
- Spiral Tribe 2 (Network 23, 1994)
- Spiral Tribe 3 (Network 23, 1994)
- Spiral Tribe 4 (Network 23, 1995)
- Spiral Tribe 5 (Network 23, 1995)
- Power House (Network 23, 1995)
- Power House 02 (Network 23, 1995)
- Full Fill Fromage (Network 23, 1996)
- Strange Breaks (Network 23, 1996)
- Fac'em If They Can't Take a Joke (Facom Unit, 1997)

=== Remixes ===
- Killing Joke – "Change" (Spiral Tribe mixes) (Virgin, 1992)

=== Appearances ===
- Shamanarchy in the UK (Evolution, 1992)
- Survival! The Dance Compilation (Guerilla Records, 1993)
- Technohead – Mix Hard or Die (React Records, 1993)
- World Traveller Adventures (DVD) (Uncivilized World, 2004)
- Aid Asia Compilation (Aid Asia, 2005)

== See also ==
- DiY Sound System
- Exodus Collective
