= Luke Slater =

English musician, DJ and record producer

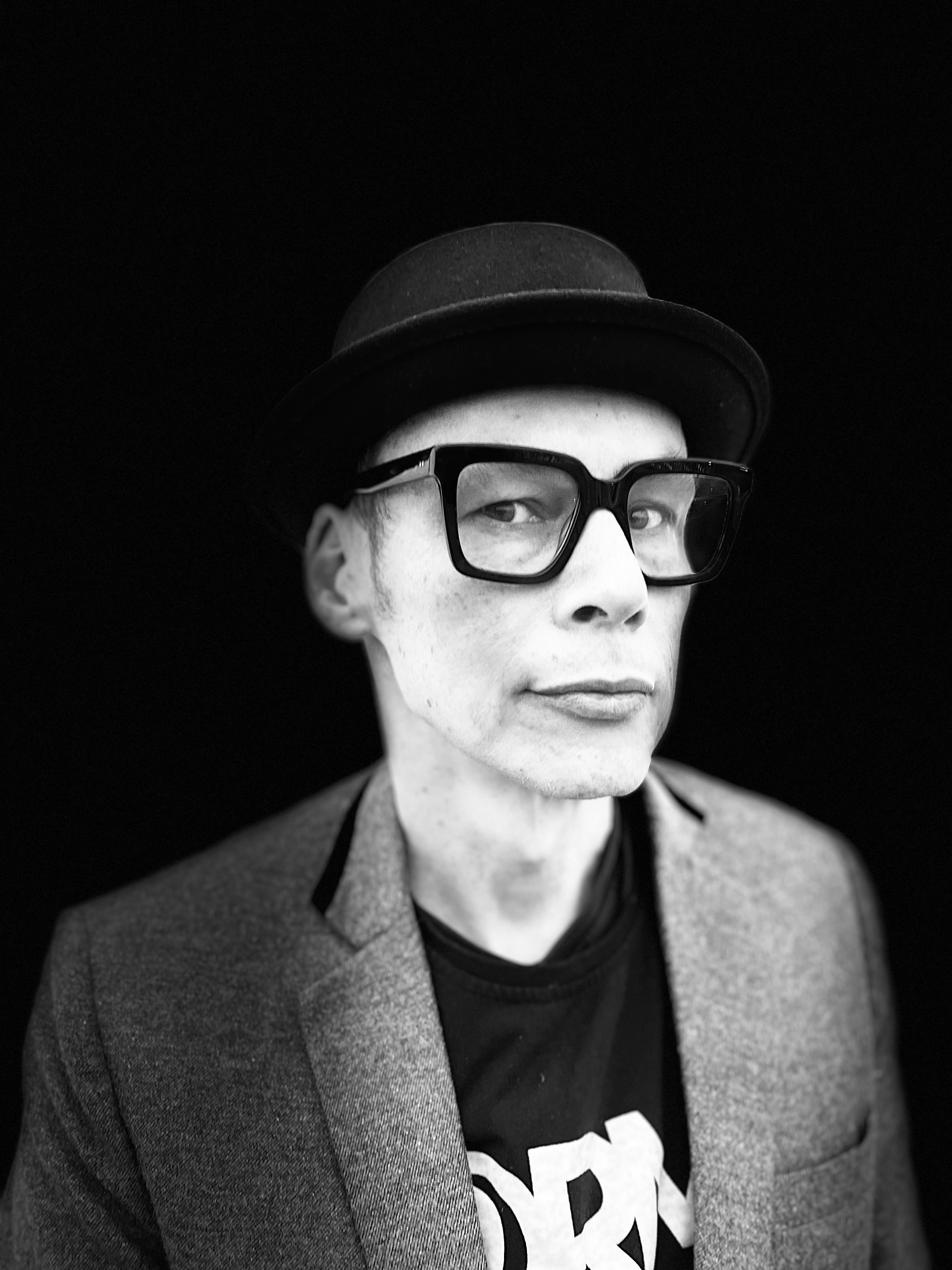

Background information
- Also known as: Planetary Assault Systems; 4 Slots for Bill; The 7th Plain; Clementine; Deputy Dawg; Earnest Honest; Krispy Krouton; L.B. Dub Corp; Lloyd Owes Me a Packet; Morganistic; Offset; Plug; Translucent
- Born: Luke Slater; 12 June 1968 (age 58)
- Origin: Reading, Berkshire, England
- Genres: Techno, electronic
- Occupations: DJ, producer
- Years active: 1989–present
- Labels: General Production; Peacefrog; Mute; Mote-Evolver; Ostgut Ton
- Website: http://www.lukeslater.com/

Luke Slater (born 12 June 1968) is an English electronic musician, DJ and record producer, who has concentrated on techno since the beginning of the 1990s. He achieved break through commercial success with his tracks "Love" (1997) and "All Exhale" (1999).

As well as releasing many tracks and albums under his own name, Slater has recorded and performed under a number of aliases; he has released music under more than 10 different names; the best known being Planetary Assault Systems, and LSD.

== Early life ==
Born in Reading and raised in Horley, Slater's early sound dalliances with his father's reel to reel tape recorder and his drumming stints led to work in local record shops, including Jelly Jam in Brighton. By 1988, Slater was immersed in the early acid house scene, DJing in London's Heaven nightclub.

== Music ==
Slater began releasing original tracks under various aliases, following his single debut in 1989 with "Momentary Vision". Releases followed on Djax as Clementine, on General Production Recordings as 7th Plain, and as Morganistic (with Alan Sage), and especially on Peacefrog Records, with nearly a dozen of releases as The X-Tront and as Planetary Assault Systems.

After releasing four albums on Peacefrog, he issued 1997's Freek Funk and Wireless two years later. His tracks "All Exhale" (2000) and "Nothing at All" (2002) reached number 74 and number 70 respectively on the UK Singles Chart. His first volume of the mix series Fear and Loathing appeared in 2001, on the React label. Alright on Top (2002) was an "album of songs" with vocals and writing courtesy of Ricky Barrow (of The Aloof). The second volume of Fear and Loathing appeared in late 2004.

Slater has released a mix for the Fabric DJ-mix series, and has reinvented innumerable tracks in remixes from artists such as Depeche Mode and Ken Ishii to more recent remixes for Radial and Soul Designer. In 2006, Slater launched his own label, Mote-Evolver, releasing limited 12" records and digital downloads through the Mote-Evolver and N.E.W.S. websites.

In 2014, he launched a podcast entitled The Spacestation.

== Pseudonyms ==
- Planetary Assault Systems (releases on Peacefrog Records, Mote-Evolver, Figure, Token and Ostgut Ton)
- The 7th Plain (releases on General Production Recordings and Ostgut Ton)
- Clementine (releases on Djax Records)
- L.B. Dub Corp (releases on Mote-Evolver and Ostgut Ton)
- Own name (releases on Peacefrog Records, novamute, Mute Records and Mote-Evolver)

== Selected discography ==
As Luke Slater

- X-Tront Vol. 2 (1993)
- Freek Funk (1997)
- Wireless (1999)
- Alright on Top (2002)

As The 7th Plain

- My Yellow Wise Rug (1994)
- The 4 Cornered Room (1994)
- Chronicles I, II, III (2018)

As Planetary Assault Systems

- The Drone Sector (1997)
- The Electric Funk Machine (1997)
- Atomic Funkster (2001)
- Temporary Suspension (2009)
- The Messenger (2011)
- Arc Angel (2016)
- ”Straight Shooting" (2019)
- Plantae (2019)
- Sky Scraping (2021)

With LSD

- Process (2017)
- Second Process (2019)

As L.B. Dub Corp

- Unknown Origin (2013)
- Side Effects (2018)
- Saturn To Home (2024)
