= Back to the Planet =

English anarcho-punk band

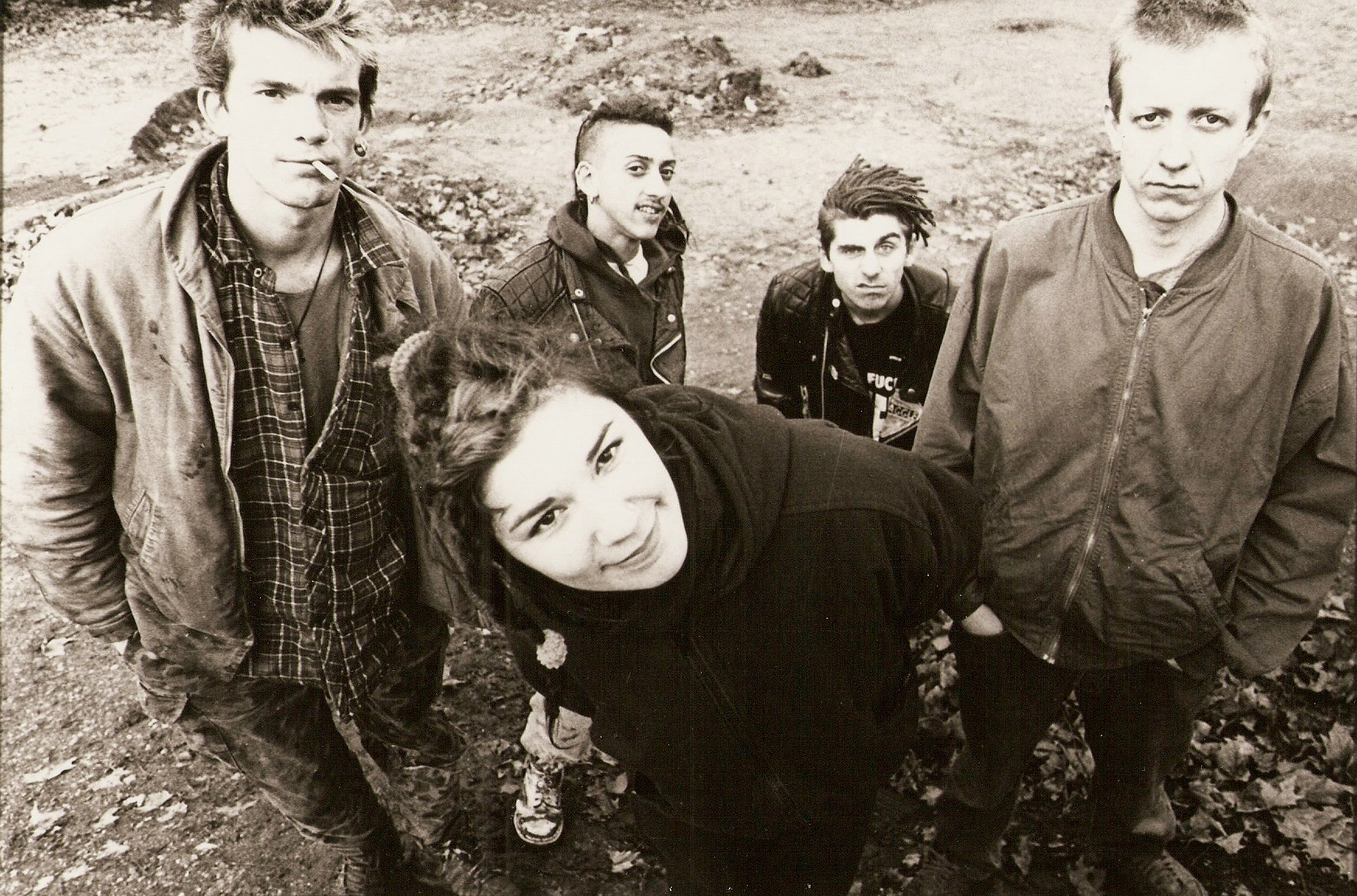

Background information
- Origin: Peckham, London, England
- Genres: Anarcho-punk
- Years active: 1989–1995; 2006–2024
- Label: Parallel
- Website: www.backtotheplanet.com

Back to the Planet were an anarcho-punk band from London, England. Their music blends elements of ska, dub, punk, and electronic dance music. They formed in 1989, split in 1995 to pursue personal music projects. They had a reunion gig in 2006 and played together irregularly since.

== History ==
Back to the Planet (BTTP) formed while squatting together in Peckham, London in 1989, and attracted a following throughout the early 1990s. They played four consecutive Glastonbury Festivals and played many free festivals, including the Deptford Urban Festival and the Castlemorton Common Festival in 1992. BTTP were vociferous in their resistance to the Criminal Justice and Public Order Act 1994 around this time and held events to protest the impending legislation.

Their first (cassette-only) album, Warning the Public, was released on their own label, Arthur Mix Records, based in Hither Green. In 1993, the band signed to Parallel Records, and released a chain of singles, having minor hits with "Teenage Turtles" and "Daydream" as well as accompanying album Mind and Soul Collaborators. Dropped from the label, BTTP split not long after the release of follow-up album, Messages After The Bleep in 1995, to pursue personal music projects.

BTTP performed a reunion gig at the Red Star Bar in Camberwell on 10 December 2006. They also played at the Endorse It in Dorset Festival in August 2007, and the main stage at that year's Beautiful Days festival. BTTP then played the Paradise Gardens free festival, London, and at the Endorse It in Dorset, Solfest and Shambhala festivals in summer 2008.

The band appeared at Glastonbury, and EnDorset in Dorset during the summer of 2009, and played the Wickerman Festival in 2010. They joined the Levelling the Land Part II tour, along with The Levellers and Dreadzone, in December 2011, headlined Rogues Picnic in May 2012, and played Bearded Theory festival the same month. Back to the Planet made a late-night appearance at The Bimble Inn at Beautiful Days Festival on Friday 17 August 2012 and were confirmed to play Alchemy Festival in September 2013.

In June 2024 the band announced that they had split once more, saying "We all felt it was time, we had a good run, we enjoyed getting back together and making some new music, but it was time for us all to move on."

== Members ==
- Fil Walters (a.k.a. Fil Planet) – vocals
- Guy McAffer (a.k.a. The Geezer) – keyboards
- Carl Hendrickse (a.k.a. Carlos Fandango) – bass
- Fraggle (Bernard Malcolm Clive Fletcher) – guitar
- Henry Cullen (a.k.a. D.A.V.E. the Drummer) – drums
- Alex Hore – guitar
- Marshall Penn – guitar
- Amir Mojarrad – drums

Outside of BTTP, Fil Planet has written and recorded a solo album, and is now the lead singer of the South East London band, Monkeyrush. Guy Mcaffer a.k.a. The Geezer is also a record producer on the London acid techno scene, and has written the album, Ave Some of That You Wankers. He and Carl Hendrickse have worked together producing acid techno under the name Audio Pancake. He also owns the record label RAW, plays the organ in The Birds of Prey, and guitar in the punk band Dog Shite. In addition, Fraggle is the lead guitarist of the punk band The Skraelings. Henry Cullen went on to become D.A.V.E the Drummer a techno producer and DJ and owner of Hydraulix records. Carl also produces and DJ's drum&bass under the name DJTrashman.

== Discography ==
=== Albums ===
- Warning the Public (cassette only) (1991)
- Earzone Friendly (cassette only) (1990)
- Mind and Soul Collaborators (1993) – UK No. 32
- A Potted History (compilation of early material) (1994)
- Messages After the Bleep (1995)

=== Singles ===
- "Revolution of Thought" 12" (1992)
- "Please Don't Fight" (1993)
- "Teenage Turtles" (1993) – UK No. 52
- "Daydream" (1993) – UK No. 52
- "A Small Nuclear Device" (1995)

=== EPs ===
- "Kick Out" (2020)
- "War Cry" (2021)

=== Other recordings ===
- "Never Let Them Down" (demo) – appeared on You Can't Kill The Spirit anti-CJB compilation 1994.
- "Livetape Vol.1" (BTTP004) – Recorded live at various locations, available at gigs in 1991.
