= Steve Bicknell =

English footballer

Personal information
- Full name: Stephen John Bicknell
- Date of birth: 28 November 1959 (age 66)
- Place of birth: Stockton, Warwickshire, England
- Position: Winger

Youth career
- 197?–1976: Leicester City

Senior career*
Years	Team	Apps	(Gls)
1976–1978	Leicester City	7	(0)
1978–1979	Torquay United	3	(0)
–	VS Rugby		
–	Southam United		
- * Club domestic league appearances and goals

Stephen John Bicknell (born 28 November 1959) is an English former professional footballer who played in the Football League for Leicester City and Torquay United.

Bicknell was born in Stockton, Warwickshire and began his career as an apprentice winger with Leicester City, turning professional in December 1976. After a bright start to his Leicester career he failed to make the league side the following season, and in August 1978 joined Torquay United on a free transfer. His Gulls career never took off, and after only three league appearances (all as a substitute) he left for VS Rugby and later played for Southam United.
