= Castlemorton Common Festival =

Free festival and rave in England

Coordinates: 52.05°N 2.32°W

- Genre: Breakbeat hardcore, techno, house, anarcho-punk
- Dates: 22–29 May 1992
- Locations: Malvern, Worcestershire, England
- Years active: 1992
- Attendance: 20,000–40,000

The Castlemorton Common Festival was a week-long free festival and rave held in the Malvern Hills near Malvern, Worcestershire, England, between 22 and 29 May 1992. The media interest and controversy surrounding the festival, and concerns as to the way it was policed, inspired the legislation that would eventually become the Criminal Justice and Public Order Act 1994.

== Background ==
On 1st June 1985, for the 11th People's Free Festival, people tried to go to Stonehenge. The police stopped a 600-person convoy, using equipment and tactics developed during the miners' strike.

In May 1992 Avon and Somerset Police tried to end the annual Avon Free Festival, which had been held in the Bristol area around the May Bank Holiday for several years. As a result, hundreds of new age travellers en route to the area for the expected festival were shunted into neighbouring counties by Avon and Somerset's Operation Nomad police manoeuvres, with West Mercia Police deciding to confine them to common land at Castlemorton.

== Events ==
The first travellers arrived on the common on 22 May, but the high-profile coverage in the national media only served to swell the crowd further as ravers from far afield made their way to join the festival, thus making it an impossible task for the authorities to close the event down. An estimated 20,000–40,000 people gathered on Castlemorton Common for the party, which lasted a full week, the biggest of its kind since the Stonehenge Free Festival in the mid-1980s.

Castlemorton hosted many of the large sound systems of the time such as Bedlam, Circus Warp, Spiral Tribe and DiY Sound System, and bands such as Back To The Planet, Xenophobia (fronted by Spiral Tribe's MC Skallywag), AOS3 and Poisoned Electrick Head.

Simon Reynolds wrote retrospectively that, "during the next five days of its existence, Castlemorton will inspire questions in Parliament, make the front page of every newspaper in England and incite nationwide panic about the whereabouts of the next destination on the crusty itinerary."

Days after the festival around twenty travellers were camped outside Worcester police station as their vehicles had been seized by West Mercia Police, preventing them from travelling on.

Speaking in a House of Commons debate, the local MP at the time, Michael Spicer, opined, "new age travellers, ravers and drugs racketeers arrived at a strength of two motorised army divisions, complete with several massed bands and, above all, a highly sophisticated command and signals system. However, they failed to bring latrines. The numbers, speed and efficiency with which they arrived—amounting at one time to as many as 30,000 people—combined to terrorise the local community to the extent that some residents had to undergo psychiatric treatment in the days that followed. Such an incident must never happen again, in my constituency or elsewhere. We need tighter laws, especially to give banning powers to the police; a Cabinet Committee to bring responsible Departments together; quicker and more co-ordinated police action; and a more effective application of existing policies by national and local authorities."

== Aftermath ==
Thirteen members of Spiral Tribe were arrested after the event, and charged with public order offences. After a lengthy and costly trial, they were acquitted.

Concerns about the festival and the way in which it was policed inspired the legislation which developed into the Criminal Justice and Public Order Act 1994. This wide-ranging Act effectively made illegal such outdoor parties playing music that, as defined in section 63(1)(b), incorporates "sounds wholly or predominantly characterised by the emission of a succession of repetitive beats".

Whilst some have argued that Castlemorton, with its attendant publicity, led directly to the Criminal Justice Act and was the "final nail in the coffin of the unlicensed event", others have seen the Act as a draconian piece of legislation which was "explicitly aimed at suppressing the activities of certain strands of alternative culture".

== Free Party: A Folk History ==
Free Party: A Folk History is a 107-minute 2023 documentary directed by Aaron Trinder that explores the origins of the subculture, the Free Party movement in the late 1980's and early 1990's, a uniting of ravers and the new age travellers near Margaret Thatcher's resignation, up to the 1992 Castlemorton festival and attempted prosecutions, the 1994 Criminal Justice and Public Order Act, and the ex-pat diaspora subculture.

== See also ==
- Criminal Justice and Public Order Act 1994
- List of electronic music festivals
- List of free parties
- Spiral Tribe
- Teknival
- DiY Sound System
