= Surgeon (musician) =

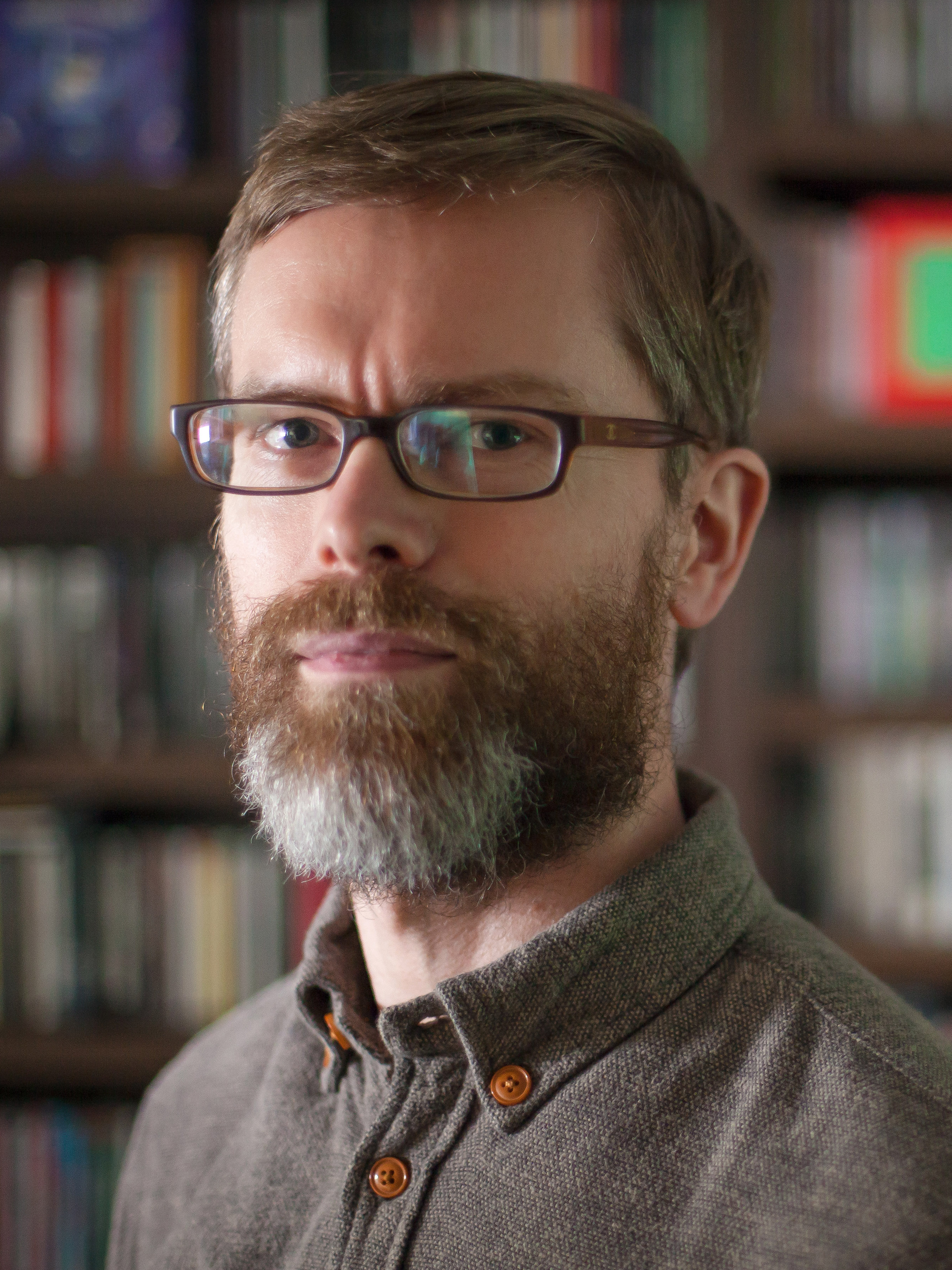
- Surgeon in 2014

Background information
- Born: Anthony Child; 1 May 1971 (age 55); Kislingbury, Northamptonshire, England
- Genres: Electronic, techno, industrial techno, Birmingham sound
- Occupations: Musician, DJ, remixer
- Instruments: Electronics, Macintosh computers, JazzMutant Lemur
- Years active: 1991–present
- Labels: Counterbalance, Dynamic Tension, Downwards, Tresor
- Website: dj-surgeon.com

Anthony Child (born 1 May 1971), better known as Surgeon, is an English electronic musician and DJ. Child releases music on his own labels Counterbalance and Dynamic Tension. Established imprints, such as Tresor, Soma, and Harthouse, have also released Surgeon's original material and remixes. He has also been recognized as one of the first wave of DJs to use Ableton Live and Final Scratch to supplement his DJ sets.

== Biography ==
Child grew up in Kislingbury, in Northamptonshire, England. In 1989, he moved to Birmingham to study audio-visual design, where he played in a jazz/rock/fusion band called Blim, and learned to DJ from friend Paul Damage. At that time, there were no Techno clubs in Birmingham so he and his friends started House of God, and by 1992 he was DJing there regularly. In 1994, he released his eponymous debut EP on Downwards Records.

Child is also known for several significant artist collaborations in his career. These include tonal experiments with Mick Harris, British Murder Boys with Regis, and with Ben Sims as Frequency 7. He has also opened for Lady Gaga, performing with Lady Starlight.

Under the pseudonym Surgeon, Child also released Basictonalvocabulary (1997), Balance (1998), Force + Form (1999), Breaking the Frame (2011), From Farthest Known Objects (2016), Luminosity Device (2018), Crash Recoil (2023), and Shell~Wave (2025).

== Musical style and influences ==
Surgeon's musical style is characterised by his incorporation of the more cinematic and left-field aspects of his musical background into his club-based material. His production, remix, and DJ repertoire are inspired by krautrock and industrial music bands such as Faust, Coil, and Whitehouse. In particular, the extent of Coil's influence is such that most of the track titles from Surgeon's Tresor album "Force and Form" are direct references to Coil recordings. Child also is influenced by Chicago house, techno, dub music and electro, and also from non-musical works by Mike Leigh, David Lynch, William S. Burroughs, Bret Easton Ellis and Cindy Sherman.

== Discography ==
=== Studio albums ===
- Communications (1996)
- Basictonalvocabulary (1997)
- Balance (1998)
- Force + Form (1999)
- Body Request (2000)
- Breaking the Frame (2011)
- From Farthest Known Objects (2016)
- Luminosity Device (2018)
- Crash Recoil (2023)
- Shell Wave (2025)
