= Regis (musician) =

- Born: Karl O'Connor
- Genres: Techno
- Years active: 1990s-present
- Label: Downwards Records

Karl O'Connor, known professionally as Regis, is an Irish-born British techno musician and record label owner.

As co-founder of Downwards Records, O'Connor, alongside his label-mate Surgeon (aka Anthony Child), was one of the originators of the Birmingham sound, forging a sound that blended Chicago house with darker European electronics. Although initially his plan was to take a "director of operations" role (he cites Daniel Miller as his greatest influence), O'Connor and his label partner Peter Sutton (aka Female) found it increasingly difficult to find artists to share their vision, and to this day still work with the same core artists.

== Music career ==
O'Connor began making music in the early 1990s and founded Downward Records with Sutton in 1993 in Halesowen. He set up the Integrale Muzique distribution company in 1996 with Sutton and Antonio Soares-Vieira. Regis' debut EP Montreal included the hypnotic industrial track "Speak To Me". Other releases from the period include the Gymnastics 2x12", and the Application of Language EP, both featuring hard minimal electronica. The era was capped off by a remix of "Totmacher" by DJ Hell. Things came full circle in the late 1990s, when O'Connor went on to work with and produce his childhood heroes Robert Görl and Chrislo Haas of Deutsch Amerikanische Freundschaft, but by this time he was already developing a more layered and tonal sound that would become his trademark in the following years.

In 2000, Downwards continued their unorthodox approach to dance music by releasing a series of 7" singles. These were a collection of noise loops, cut-ups and industrial death pop, including O'Connor's Suicide-esque "A Man Has Responsibilities", under the Diversion Group guise. 2000 also saw the release of Againstnature for Berlin-based label Tresor. Recorded with collaboration of Peter Sutton under his real name, the LP was an example of raw techno, coupled with organic field recordings. The duo were unhappy with the way Tresor altered the album for release and it was reissued as LP in the way they had originally intended in 2010. Title of that album was changed to Againstnature (11 Reclaimed Fragments) and it was branded under different alias as Regis/Female.

2001 saw the release of Penetration a record that would move the Regis sound on yet again. A combination of tonal drones layered with heavy percussion was inspirational to a new generation of techno producers. This influence was underlined when Regis and Surgeon started the British Murder Boys (BMB) project in 2002. More a group project, BMB drew on their non-techno influences to create an original concept for the dancefloor. Their recorded output included the tracks "Don't Give Way To Fear" and "Learn Your Lesson", but the group also played live, with gigs often ending in total chaos and digital feedback. Since 2001 Regis has been less prolific, but continues to work in techno.

O'Connor joined with other artists such as Silent Servant (Juan Mendez), Female (Peter Sutton), Rrose and Function (Dave Sumner) in the Sandwell District international techno collective/label in 2002. O'Connor and Sumner also work together as club DJs under the Sandwell District name. He has also collaborated with Juan Mendez (Silent Servant/Tropic of Cancer) as Sandra Electronics, with Sumner as Portion Reform, and with former Napalm Death drummer Mick Harris as Ugandan Speed Trials. He has also released records under the name Kalon and CUB. One of O'Connor and Harris's collaborations was as part of the mixed media Narcissus Trance exhibition at the Event Gallery in London in June 2010, exploring the ideas of Marshall McLuhan on the interaction of technology and humanity. O'Connor was recently credited as "executive producer" on former Sandwell District label-mate Silent Servant's album "Negative Fascination."

== Discography ==
=== Albums ===
- Gymnastics (1996), Downwards
- Delivered into The Hands of Indifference (1998), Downwards
- Regis (2000), Downwards
- Penetration (2001), Downwards
- Againstnature (11 Reclaimed Fragments) (2011), Downwards
- Death Head Said (2012), Downwards
- Hidden in This Is the Light That You Miss (2020), Downwards

=== Singles ===
- "Untitled" (1996), Downwards
- "We Said No" (1996), Downwards
- "Facilities" (1998), Downwards
- "Divine Ritual" (1999), Downwards
- Blood into Gold EP (1999), Downwards
- "Born-Against" (20??), Downwards – as Kalon
