= Downwards Records =

Record label

Downwards Records is a record label founded by the techno DJs and producers Regis and Female in Birmingham, England in 1993. The label was initially established to release the set of tracks that fellow Birmingham DJ and producer Surgeon had recorded in the small studio that ex-Napalm Death drummer Mick Harris had built in his downstairs toilet.

Although most closely associated with techno's Birmingham sound, which it pioneered, the label has released a wide range of music, from garage rock and shoegaze to industrial music and electronica.
