= Justin Broadrick discography =

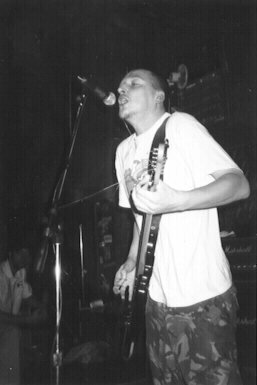
Broadrick performing with Godflesh in 1996

This is a partial discography of Justin Broadrick, a prolific English songwriter, guitarist, singer, producer and general multi-instrumentalist musician most known for being the leading force of the industrial metal band Godflesh. Broadrick is also recognized for his experimental project Jesu, his key contributions to the seminal grindcore album Scum (1987) by Napalm Death, and his strong presence in the electronic and industrial remix community.

Throughout his career, Broadrick has released music under numerous different titles and with numerous different artists. He has provided remixes for Pantera, Isis, Mogwai, Pelican and many others. His music, especially under the Godflesh title, has been cited as a powerful early influence on industrial and extreme music at large.

== As frontman ==
=== Godflesh (1988–2002, 2010–present) ===
- Godflesh (1988)
- Streetcleaner (1989)
- Loopflesh/Fleshloop (1991)
- Slavestate (1991)
- Slateman (1991)
- Cold World (1991)
- Pure (1992)
- Merciless (1994)
- Selfless (1994)
- Crush My Soul (1994)
- Songs of Love and Hate (1996)
- Love and Hate in Dub (1997)
- Us and Them (1999)
- Messiah (2000/reissued in 2003)
- Hymns (2001)
- In All Languages (2001)
- Streetcleaner: Live at Roadburn 2011 (2013)
- Decline & Fall (2014)
- A World Lit Only by Fire (2014)
- Post Self (2017)
- New Flesh in Dub (2021)
- Nero (2023)
- Purge (2023)
- A World Lit Only by Dub (2024)
- Decay (2026)

=== Jesu (2004–present) ===
- Heart Ache (2004)
- Jesu (2004)
- Silver (2006)
- Conqueror (2007)
- Sun Down/Sun Rise (2007)
- Jesu/Eluvium (split EP with Eluvium) (2007)
- Lifeline (2007)
- Pale Sketches (2007)
- Envy/Jesu (split with Envy) (2008)
- Why Are We Not Perfect? (2008)
- Jesu/Battle of Mice (split with Battle of Mice) (2008)
- Infinity (2009)
- Opiate Sun (2009)
- Heart Ache/Dethroned (2010)
- Christmas (2010)
- Ascension (2011)
- Duchess/Veiled (2012)
- Every Day I Get Closer to the Light From Which I Came (2013)
- Jesu/Sun Kil Moon (collaboration with Sun Kil Moon) (2016)
- Resolution Heart (collaboration with Dirk Serries) (2016)
- 30 Seconds to the Decline of Planet Earth (collaboration with Sun Kil Moon) (2017)
- Never (2020)
- Terminus (2020)
- Pity/Piety (2022)
- Hard To Reach (2024)

== As a member ==
=== Fall of Because (1983–1987) ===
- Extirpate (1986)
- Life Is Easy (1999)

=== Napalm Death (1985–1986) ===
- Scum (Note: Side A only) (1987)

=== Head of David (1987–1989) ===
- Dustbowl (1988)
- The Saveana Mixes (1988)
- White Elephant (1989)

=== Sweet Tooth (1990–1993) ===
- Soft White Underbelly (1990)
- Crash Live (1993)

=== Techno Animal (1991–2004) ===
- Ghosts (1991)
- Re-Entry (1995)
- Babylon Seeker (1996)
- Unmanned (1996)
- Phobic (1997)
- Demonoid version 1 (1997)
- Demonoid version 2 (1997)
- Techno Animal Versus Reality (1998)
- Cyclops (1998)
- Radio Hades (1998)
- Monolith (1999)
- Symbiotics (1999)
- Eraser (2000)
- Megaton (2000)
- Dead Man's Curse (2001)
- The Brotherhood of the Bomb (2001)
- We Can Build You (2001)
- Re-Entry (2023 Remaster) (2023)
- The Brotherhood of the Bomb (2023 Remaster) (2024)

=== God (1992–1994) ===
- Possession (1992)
- The Anatomy of Addiction (1994)

=== Ice (1993–1998) ===
- Under the Skin (1993)
- Quarantine (1995)
- Headwreck (1998)
- Bad Blood (1998)
- Trapped in Three Dimensions (1999)

=== The Sidewinder (1996–1998) ===
- Colonized (1996)
- Implant (1997)

=== Youpho (1998–2000) ===
- Anti Body/Mode 7 (1998)
- Anxiety/Life (1998)
- Malfunktion/Program (2000)

=== The Curse of the Golden Vampire (1998–2003) ===
- The Curse of the Golden Vampire (1998)
- Mass Destruction (2003)

=== White Viper (1998–1999) ===
- Crawler/Into The Light (1999)

=== Zonal (2000, 2017–present) ===
- The Quatermass Project, Volume 1 (2000)
- Zonal (2019)

=== Eraser (2000) ===
- Overdrive/Overdose (2000)

=== with Jarboe (2008) ===
- J² (2008)

=== Oxbow presents Love's Holiday Orchestra (2008) ===
- Live at Supersonic, 2007 (2008)

=== Council Estate Electronics (2009–present) ===
- Kitsland (available exclusively as a digital release) (2009)
- Longmeadow (available exclusively as a digital release) (2012)
- Arktika (2016)
- Mirfield (2025)

=== Greymachine (2009–present) ===
- Disconnected (2009)

=== The Blood of Heroes (2009–present) ===
- The Blood of Heroes (2010)
- Remain (2010)
- The Waking Nightmare (2012)
- Nine Cities (2023)

=== with Andrew Broder (2010) ===
- Kissing Kin Singles Club (2010)

=== Valley of Fear (2012) ===
- Valley of Fear (2012)

=== Loud as Giants (2023) ===
- Empty Homes (2023)

=== Pynuka (2023) ===
- Not In The Sense That We Did Something Wrong (2023)

== Solo projects ==
=== Final (1983–1987, 1993–present) ===
- Desquamation (Cassette) (1983)
- Exterpite (Cassette) (1983)
- A Final Process Of Elimination (Cassette) (1984)
- Assault (Cassette) (1984)
- Live Mission 1 (Cassette) (1984)
- Live Mission 2 (Cassette) (1984)
- Smear Atrocity (Cassette) (1984)
- Maximum Hatred (Cassette) (1985)
- Fight Back (Cassette) (1985)
- Live Mission 3 (Cassette) (1985)
- Live Mission 4 (Cassette) (1985)
- Live Mission 5 (Cassette) (1985)
- To The Desinfectionraum (Cassette) (1985)
- Inheritance (Cassette) (1986)
- Execution Of The Will (Cassette) (1986)
- One (1993)
- Flow/Openings (7") (1995)
- Solaris (EP) (1996)
- 2 (1996)
- Urge/Fail (7") (1996)
- The First Millionth of a Second (1997)
- 3 (2006)
- Infinite Guitar 1 (CDr) (2007)
- Infinite Guitar 2 (CDr) (2007)
- Guitar & Bass Improvisations Volume 1 (CDr) (2007)
- Guitar & Bass Improvisations Volume 2 (CDr) (2007)
- Infinite Guitar 1 & 2/Guitar & Bass Improvisations Vol 1 & 2 (CDr) (2008)
- Fade Away (2008)
- :Afar: (2008)
- Dead Air (2008)
- Reading All The Right Signals Wrong (2009)
- Infinite Guitar 3/Guitar & Bass Improvisations 3 (2009)
- Final + Fear Falls Burning (with Fear Falls Burning) (2009)
- My Body is a Dying Machine (Digital EP) (2010)
- The Apple Never Falls Far From The Tree (2010)
- Burning Bridges Will Light Your Way (Digital) (2012)
- Infinite Guitar 4 (2013)
- Black Dollars (Digital) (2015) – expanded reissue of My Body is a Dying Machine EP
- You Couldn't Mean Any Less EP (Digital) (2020)
- Live Incubate (Digital) (2020)
- Oblivion Vol. 1 (Digital) (2021)
- Oblivion Vol. 2 (Digital) (2022)
- Expect Nothing And The Kingdom Will Be Yours (Digital) (2022)
- It Comes To Us All (2022)
- I Am the Dirt Under Your Fingernails (2022)
- Oblivion Vol. 3 (Digital) (2022)
- Oblivion 0 (Digital) (2023)
- Ravine Of Spears (with Richard Ramirez) (LP and digital) (2023)
- What We Don't See (2024)
- Giving Up, One Day At A Time (Digital) (2025)
- Cracked Paint (with Black Leather Jesus) (Cassette and digital) (2026)

=== Last Exit (1984) ===
- 06.03.84 (1984)

=== Split with Andy Hawkins (1995) ===
- Subsonic 3: Skinner's Black Laboratories (1995)

=== Hydrus (1996) ===
- Jazzless (1996)

=== Solaris BC (1996–2009) ===
- 01 (1996)
- 02 (1997)
- Submerged Technology (2009)

=== Krackhead (1998–2009) ===
- From Hell (2009)

=== Tech Level 2 (2000–2003, 2020–present) ===
- Hymn/Hard Times (Dub) (2000)
- Tempest/Lexicon (2001)
- Teknological/Master (2002)
- Whowanseekwar (2003) (split 12" with Soundmurderer & SK-1)
- Revolve (2020)
- Depths (2021)
- Indifferent (EP) (2025)

=== White Static Demon (2009–2013) ===
- Decayed (2009)
- Apparitions (2010)
- The Poisoned Tape (2013)

=== Pale Sketcher (2010–present) ===
- Can I Go Now (Gone Version) (2010)
- Jesu: Pale Sketches Demixed (2010)
- Seventh Heaven (2011)
- Warm Sunday/Mogadon (2013)
- Just Won't Sing (2013)
- Golden Skin (2022)

=== JK Flesh (2012–present) ===
- Posthuman (2012)
- Worship is the Cleansing of the Imagination (2012) – split EP with Prurient
- Nothing Is Free (2015)
- Suicide Estate/Suicide Estate Antibiotic Armageddon (2016)
- Rise Above (2016)
- Exit Stance (2017)
- PI04 (2018)
- Wasplike (2018)
- New Horizon (2018)
- Light Bringer (2019) - collaboration with Orphx
- Knights of the Black Table (2019) – split EP with Goth-Trad
- Halved (2019) – split EP with Klaska
- In Your Pit (2019)
- Depersonalization (2020)
- Echology Vol. 1 (2020) – collaboration with Echologist
- See Red (2021) - split EP with Monrella
- JK Flesh vs Gnod (2021) – collaboration with Gnod
- Echology Vol. 2 (2021) – collaboration with Echologist
- Disintegration Dubs (2021) – collaboration with G36
- New Religions Old Rules (2022)
- Veneer of Tolerance (2022)
- Sewer Bait (2022)
- No Exits (Digital) (2023)
- PI11 (2023)
- Veneer of Tolerance Remixes (2024)
- Echo Chamber Music 01 (2024)
- Live. 2018 (2025)
- Shouting the Odds (2026) – split LP with Monrella
- Prehuman. Fleshstep (2026)
- Death / Rebirth One (2026) – split EP with Orphx

=== Exit Electronics (2022–present) ===
- Learn the Hard Way (2022)
- Believe Anything, Believe Everything (2023)
- I'm Your Beggar (Digital) (2026)

== As a contributor ==
=== Compilation appearances ===
Sources:

- Destined to Decay compilation (1986) – provided 7 tracks under various monikers
- Belial compilation (1986) – provided 4 tracks under various monikers
- Power and Control compilation – provided 8 tracks under various monikers
- Economi$ed compilation (2000) – provided 2 tracks
- for-Wards compilation (2018) – provided 1 track, "An Ode To Yorks Wood"

=== Guest instrumentation ===
- Scorn – Vae Solis (1992) – additional guitar
- Painkiller – Buried Secrets – guitar, drum machine, vocals on "Buried Secrets" and "The Toll"
- Deathless – Nondeathless (1993) – bass on "Storm 2"
- Philippe Petit & Friends – (Reciprocess: +/VS.) – Documenting the Process of Musical Reciprocality Between Philippe Petit & Friends (2009) – one-track collaboration with Petit
- Alan Moore & Mitch Jenkins – Unearthing (2010) – guitar on the soundtrack
- Submerged – Before Fire I Was Against Other People (2011) – 8-string guitar on "Dead"
- Philippe Petit – Una Symphonia Della Paura (2012) – featured on "Murmurs"
- The Bug – Angels & Devils (2014) – guitar on "The One" and "Fat Mac"
- Shapednoise – Different Selves (2015) – bass and electronics on "Enlightenment"
- Submerged v Bill Laswell – After Such Knowledge, What Forgiveness? (2016) – guitar on "The Summoning"
- Cavalera Conspiracy – Psychosis (2017) – vocals on "Hellfire"
- Shapednoise – Blaze (2019) – featured on "Aesthesis"
- Phoebe Bridgers - Lost Weekend (2026) – electric guitar on "Bobby" and "Best Dressed"

=== Technical ===
- Cable Regime – Assimilate & Destroy (1992) production
- Cable Regime – Life In The House Of The Enemy (1992) production, mixing
- Cable Regime – Kill Lies All (1993) production
- Lull – Journey Through Underworlds (1993) mixing
- Pram – Iron Lung (1993) recording
- Terminal Power Company – Red Skin Eclipse (1993) production, mixing
- Terminal Power Company – Juggernaut (1993) production
- Deathless – Nondeathless (1993) production
- Cable Regime – King of Beers (1993) production
- Cable Regime – Brave New World (1995) production
- Cable Regime – Cable Regime (2000) production
- Pelican – After the Ceiling Cracked (2007) live technician
- Gallhammer – Ruin of a Church (2008) production
- Transitional – Nothing Real Nothing Absent (2008) mastering
- Jarboe – Live In London 2005 (2008) live mixing
- Isis – Live V (2009) live mixing
- Transitional – Stomach Of The Sun (2009) mastering
- Constants – If Tomorrow The War (2010) production
- Necessary – Voldsløkka (2010) production
- ...And The Earth Swarmed With Them – The Fading Voice Of The Old Era Speaks To Us, But Where Are The Ears Left To Hear It? (2010) mixing
- Sky Burial – Aegri Somnia (2011) mastering
- Ramesses – Possessed By The Rise Of Magik (2011) mixing, executive production
- Transitional – Dark Matter Communion (2013) mastering
- Halspirit – Musiques Immobiles : point central (2014) mastering
- Dragged into Sunlight/Gnaw Their Tongues – NV (2015) production
- End Christian – Bach Part One (2018) additional mixing, production on "Great Escapes"
- Vatican Shadow – Persian Pillars of the Gasoline Era (2020) mastering
- Vatican Shadow– 20th Hijacker (2025) mastering

== Remixes ==
As Final

- Jesu – "Christmas (Final Remix)" (2010)
- Vidna Obmana – "Out from the Garden Reminded" (2011)

As Godflesh

- The Lemonheads – "Godflesh Style (Remix By Justin K. Broadrick)" (1994)
- Khost (Deconstructed and Reconstructed by Godflesh) – Needles Into The Ground (2016)
- The Membranes – "21st Century Man (Godflesh Remix)" (2016)
- Mortiis – "The Great Leap (Godflesh)" (2017), also "Extended Version"
- Controlled Bleeding – "Swarm (Remix by Justin K. Broadrick/Godflesh)" (2017)

As Jesu

- Necessary Intergalactic Cooperation – "Materialismo (Jesu Mix)" (2005) on Teledubgnosis vs. N.I.C.
- Agoraphobic Nosebleed – "Flesh of Jesu Mix" (2006) on PCP Torpedo/ANbRx
- Explosions in the Sky – "The Birth and Death of The Day (Jesu Mix)" (2007) on All of a Sudden I Miss Everyone
- Maninkari – "Participation Mystic (Remix by Jesu)" (2007)
- Fog – "I Have Been Wronged (Jesu Remix)" (2007)
- Pyramids – "The Echo of Something Lovely (Jesu)" (2008) on Pyramids
- School of Seven Bells – "Face To Face on High Places (Jesu Remix)" (2009)
- School of Seven Bells – "Face To Face on High Places (Jesu Remix - Instrumental Version)" (2009)
- Iroha – "Last Day of Summer (Jesu Remix)" (2011)
- Vidna Obmana – "Out from the Garden Reminded" (2011)
- Challenger – "Life in the Paint (Jesu Remix)" (2012)
- Isaurian – "Hologram (Jesu Remix)" (2017)
- Jack Colwell – "Beneather (Jesu Remix)" (2017)
- Oathbreaker – "Ease Me (Jesu Remix)" (2020)
- Interpol – "Toni (Jesu Remix)" (2023)
- Bomb a Lil Joy – "Lament (Jesu Remix)" (2025)

As JK Flesh

- Necessary Intergalactic Cooperation – "Say U Sick (JK Flesh Mix)" (2005) on Teledubgnosis vs. N.I.C.
- Necessary Intergalactic Cooperation – "Big Smoke Dub" (2007)
- Final – "Inanimate Air (JK Flesh Remix)" (2010)
- Cloaks – "Rust on Metal (JK Flesh Remix)" (2011)
- Jesu – "Christmas (JK Flesh Remix)" (2012)
- Violetshaped – "cX31Ø (JK Flesh Reshape)" (2013)
- RA – "Paz Podre (JK Flesh Remix)" (2014)
- AnD – "Non Sky Signal Noise (Justin Broadrick as JK Flesh Remix)" (2015)
- Necessary – "Insisting on Racial Name Calling (JK Flesh Remix)" (2015)
- Health – "Men Today (JK Flesh Remix)" (2017)
- These Hidden Hands – "Dendera Light (JK Flesh Remix)" (2017)
- Survive – "Other (Justin K. Broadrick as JK Flesh Remix)" (2017)
- Addremove – "Crie (JK Flesh Remix)" (2017)
- Dead Fader – "FYI (JK Flesh Remix)" (2017)
- Godflesh – "In Your Shadow (JK Flesh Reshape)" (2017)
- End Christian – "Altered for Concern (JK Flesh Mix)" (2018)
- Phal:Angst – "The Books (JK Flesh Remix)" (2018)
- Vatican Shadow – "The House of the Followers (JK Flesh Remix)" (2019)
- Viviankrist – "Blue Iron – Iron Flesh Reshape (JK Flesh Remix)" (2020)
- This Celestial Engine – "Rewire My Subtext (JK Flesh RMX)" (2024)
- Derision Cult - "Warning Signs (JKFleshmix)" (2024)
- Cruel Decisions – "Fake Syndicate (JK Flesh Remix)" (2025)

As Pale Sketcher

- Jesu – "Christmas (Pale Sketcher Remix)" (2010)
- Miracle – "Good Love (Pale Sketcher Remake)" (2012)
- Necessary – "IORNC (Pale Sketcher Remix)" (2012)
- Multiple Mono – "False Prophet (Pale Sketcher Remix)" (2013)

As Solaris

- Tactile – "Intervention 6 – Tactile Vs. Solaris" (1996)

As Sub Species (with Kevin Martin)

- The Jon Spencer Blues Explosion – "Money Rock'N'Roll" (Sub Species Mix)" (2002)
- T. Raumschmiere – "A Million Brothers (Sub Species Remix)" (2003), also dub version

As Tech Level 2

- The Bug vs The Rootsman – "WWW (Tech Level 2 Remix)" (2002)
- Teledubgnosis – "80 Creeps (Dub & Bass Head Mix)" (2003)
- Paragon - "Shadow Mechanics (Tech Level 2 RMX)" (2021)

As Techno Animal (with Kevin Martin)

- Magnet – "Miles To Go (Invisible Man)" (1996)
- The Rootsman – "Tribal Dervish (Urban Guerilla Mix)" (1997)
- Einstürzende Neubauten – "Die Explosion Im Festspielhaus" (1997)
- DJ Vadim – "The Breaks (Techno Animal Remix)" (1997)
- Stina Nordenstam – "People Are Strange (Techno Animal Remix)" (1998)
- The Jon Spencer Blues Explosion – Techno Animal Remixes (2000)
- Dälek – "Classical Homicide (Remix)" (2000)
- 2nd Gen – "And/Or (Techno Animal Vocal Mix Featuring Dälek)" (2001), also "Instrumental Mix"
- s.y.d. – "Not Yet (Splatter Mix By Techno Animal)" (2001)
- The Jon Spencer Blues Explosion – "Over and Over (Techno Animal Mix)" (2002)

As himself

- Pantera – "Fucking Hostile (Biochemical Mix)" and "By Demons Be Driven (Biochemical Mix)" (1992) on the Walk Biomechanical EP
- Murder, Inc. – "Last of the Biomechanical Urgents" (1993)
- Deathless – "Inexstasis (JK Broadrick Remix)" (1995)
- The Mark of Cain – "You Let Me Down (Biomechanical Mix)" and "Pointman (Unclean Mix)" (1998)
- Pigface – "Burundi (Overload Mix)" (1998)
- David Kristian – "Cookie" (1999)
- Cylon vs. Quoit – "Plug 8 Remix" (2000)
- Isis – "Celestial (Signal Fills the Void)" (2001) on SGNL›05
- Isis – "Hym (Justin Broadrick Remix)" (2004) on Oceanic Remixes and Reinterpretations
- Pelican – "Angel Tears (JK Broadrick Remix)" (2005) on March into the Sea
- Earth – "Harvey" (2005) on Legacy of Dissolution
- Knut – "H/armless" (2006) on Alter
- 5ive – "Soma Remix By J K Broadrick (Stage 1)" and "Soma Remix By J K Broadrick (Stage 2)" (2006)
- Genghis Tron – "Colony Collapse (Justin K. Broadrick Remix)" (2008) on Board Up The House Remixes Volume 1
- Constants – "Those Who Came Before Pt. I" (2009) on The Foundation, The Machine, The Ascension
- Lustmord – "Dub Awakening (Justin K. Broadrick Remix)" (2009)
- Yakuza – "The Blinding (Justin K. Broadrick Remix)" (2009) on Transmutations
- October File – Our Souls To You bonus disc (2010)
- Majeure – "Teleforce (Justin K. Broadrick Remix)" (2010)
- Killing Joke – "European Super State (Justin Broadrick Remix)" (2010)
- Circle of Animals – "Invisible War" (2010)
- Bear in Heaven – "Dust Cloud (Justin K. Broadrick Remix)" (2010) on Beast Rest Forth Mouth
- The Blood of Heroes – "Remain (Justin K. Broadrick Remix)" (2010)
- Continuum – Continuum Recyclings Volume Two (2010)
- Iroha – Iroha bonus disc (2011)
- Extra Life – "Made Flesh (Justin K. Broadrick Remix)" (2011)
- Ceremony – "It's Too Late (Justin K. Broadrick)" (2011)
- Mogwai – "George Square Thatcher Death Party (Justin K. Broadrick Reshape)" (2012) on A Wrenched Virile Lore
- My Disco – "All I Can Do (Justin K. Broadrick's Warmer Remix)" (2012)
- My Disco – "All I Can Do (Justin K. Broadrick's Heavier Remix)" (2012)
- Cult Of Luna – "Vicarious Redemption (Remix By Justin K. Broadrick)" (2013) on Vertikal II
- Empty Flowers – "Car Fires (JK Broadrick Remix)" (2014)
- Dirk Serries – "There's a Light in Vein" (2014)
- Endon – "Etude for Lynching by Family (Justin K. Broadrick Remix)" (2014)
- Pale Horseman – "Fork in the Road (Justin K. Broadrick Remix)" (2014)
- Amantra – "Rituals (Justin K. Broadrick Remix)" (2014)
- Coliseum – "White Magic Punks: Sorcerer Mix (Justin K. Broadrick)" (2014)
- Atlanta Industrial Sector – "Immanence (Justin K. Broadrick 'Destroyed Version')" (2014)
- Solypsis – "Unperfect (Justin Broadrick Reshape)" (2014)
- Invertia – "The Sidewinding (Justin K. Broadrick Remix)" (2014)
- La Fin Absolute Du Monde – "Black Sheep (Justin K. Broadrick Remix)" (2014)
- Pelican – "The Cliff (Justin Broadrick Remix)" (2015) on The Cliff
- Nicolas Godin – "Widerstehe Doch Der Sünde (Justin K. Broadrick remix)" (2015)
- The View Electrical – "Treasures (Justin K. Broadrick Remix)" (2016)
- Frank Rosaly – "Malo III (Justin K. Broadrick Remix)" (2016)
- Steven Wilson & Dirk Serries – The Continuum Recyclings, Volume II (2016)
- Drug Honkey – "Pool of Failure (Justin K. Broadrick Remix)" (2017)
- Guerrilla Ghost – "Everybody Rap (Justin K. Broadrick Remix)" (2018)
- Full of Hell – "Thundering Hammers (JK Broadrick Remix)" (2019) from Weeping Choir
- Earth - "Teeth of Lions Rule the Divine (Justin K. Broadrick Remix)" (2023) from Earth 2.23 Special Lower Frequency Mix
- Chelsea Wolfe - "Everything Turns Blue (Justin K. Broadrick Remix)" (2024) from Undone EP
- Lamb of God - "Omertá (Justin K. Broadrick Remix)" (2024) from Ashes of the Wake (20th Anniversary Edition)
- Cyanotic - "Nothing Changes (Justin K. Broadrick Fleshmix)" (2026)
