= Jesu discography =

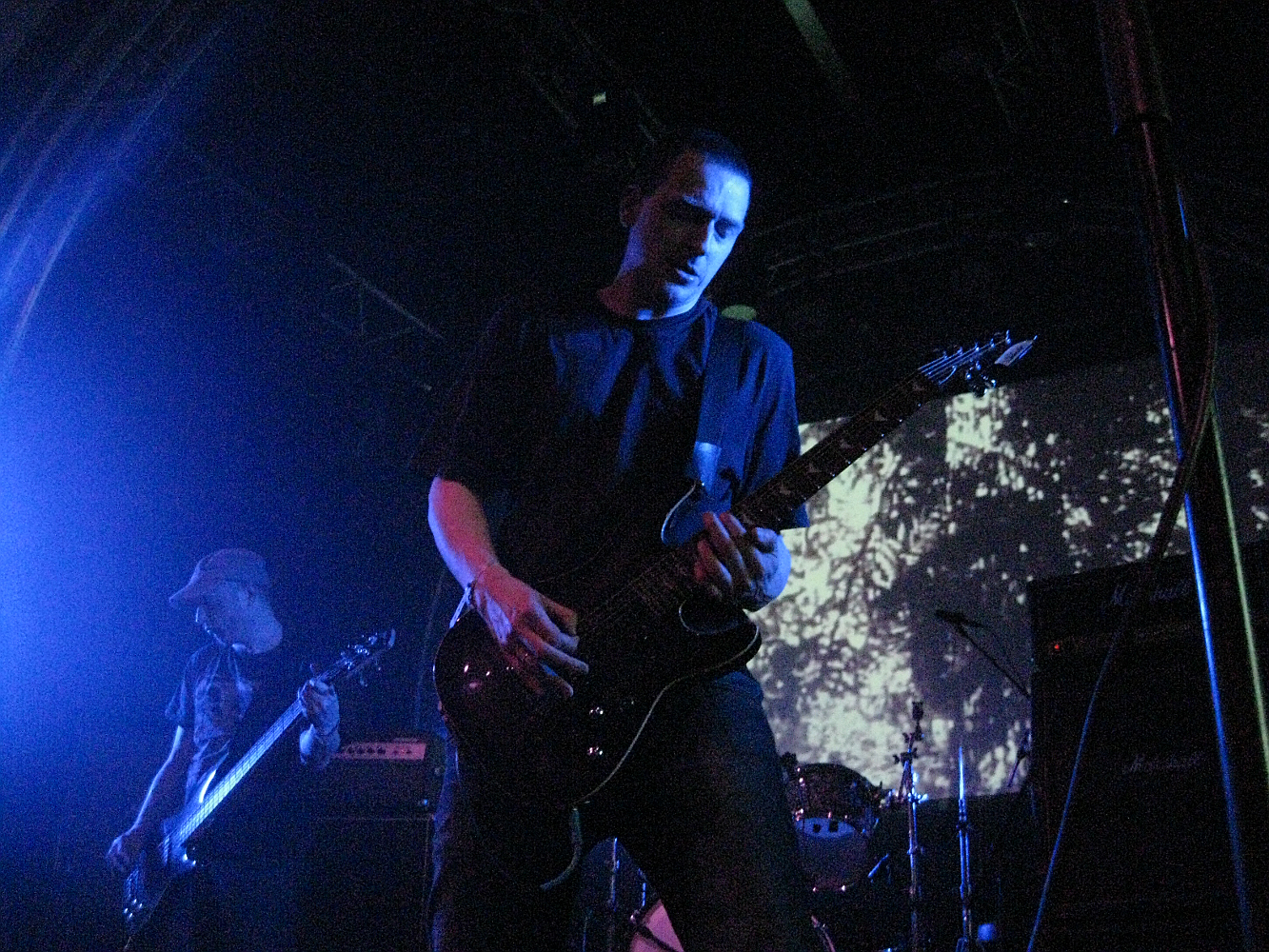
- Studio albums: 5
- Extended plays: 14
- Compilation albums: 1
- Tribute albums: 2
- Singles: 4
- Pale Sketcher releases: 6
- Split releases: 3
- Other appearances: 1

The discography of the band Jesu consists of eighteen official releases. This includes four full-length albums, two compilation albums, seven EPs, and three split albums. An additional EP, a remixed album, and a single were released under the moniker Pale Sketcher. Jesu is a post-metal band formed in 2003 by Justin Broadrick following the breakup of Godflesh. In March, 2010, Broadrick announced that he felt Jesu had strayed further away from the guitar driven music that he had intended, and more into electronica. As a resolution, although Jesu would still contain electronic elements, it would return to a guitar driven sound while the Pale Sketcher project would allow Broadrick to explore the electronica oriented sound further without interfering with Jesu.

== Studio albums ==
Year	Details
2004	Jesu: Released: 8 December 2004; Label: Hydra Head (#HH666-79), Conspiracy (core 026), Daymare (PTCD-1015-6, DYMC-045); Format: CD, vinyl; Re-released as Jesu (Deluxe) Avalanche Recordings (AREC057) on 11 March 2022
2007	Conqueror: Released: 2 February 2007; Label: Hydra Head (HH666-126), Daymare (DYMC-017), Conspiracy (CORE046); Format: CD, vinyl
2011	Ascension: Released: 10 May 2011; Label: Caldo Verde (CV013); Format: CD
2013	Everyday I Get Closer to the Light from Which I Came: Released: 23 September 2013; Label: Avalanche Recordings (AREC027), Daymare (DYMC-201); Format: CD, vinyl, digital
2020	Terminus: Released: 13 November 2020; Label: Avalanche Recordings; Format: CD, vinyl

== Extended plays ==
Year	Details
2004	Heart Ache: Released: 30 August 2004; Label: Dry Run (dry98cd), Avalanche Recordings (AREC007), Hydra Head (HH666-197), Daymare (DYMC-131); Format: CD, vinyl; Re-released as Heart Ache/Dethroned EP in 2010
2006	Silver: Released: 11 April 2006; Label: Hydra Head (HH666-110), Daymare (DYMC002), Conspiracy (Core032); Format: CD, vinyl
2007	Sun Down/Sun Rise: Released: 2 February 2007; Label: Aurora Borealis, Daymare; Format: vinyl
2007	Jesu/Eluvium: Released: 5 July 2007; Label: Hydra Head (HH666-136), Temporary Residence (TRR126), Daymare; Format: Vinyl; Split EP with Eluvium; Jesu tracks re-released as Why Are We Not Perfect? EP in 2008
2007	Lifeline: Released: 4 October 2007; Label: Hydra Head (HH666-127), Daymare (DYMC-044); Format: CD
2008	Envy/Jesu: Released: 11 July 2008; Label: Daymare (DYMC-066), Conspiracy (CORE068), Hydra Head (HH666-169); Format: CD, vinyl; Split EP with Envy; Jesu tracks re-released as Hard to Reach EP in 2024
2008	Jesu/Battle of Mice: Released: 12 August 2008; Label: Robotic Empire; Format: CD, vinyl; Split EP with Battle of Mice
2008	Why Are We Not Perfect?: Released: 19 August 2008; Label: Hydra Head (62362), (Daymare); Format: CD
2009	Infinity: Released: 23 July 2009; Label: Avalanche Recordings (AAREC017, REC019), Daymare (DYMC96); Format: CD, digital, vinyl; Re-released digitally as Infinity (Digital Deluxe Edition) EP on 16 May 2014
2009	Opiate Sun: Released: 27 October 2009; Label: Caldo Verde (CDCV009), Aural Exploits/Caldo Verde (AELP3002), Daymare (DYMC110); Format: CD, vinyl
2010	Heart Ache/Dethroned: Released: 16 November 2010; Label: Hydra Head; Format: CD, vinyl
2010	Christmas: Released: 9 December 2010; Label: Avalanche Recordings (AREC 021); Format: Digital
2018	Jesu/Yang Li - Christmas EP: Released: 7 December 2018; Label: Hospital Productions (HOS625); Format: Digital
2020	Never: Released: 3 July 2020; Label: Avalanche Recordings (AREC048); Format: CD, vinyl, digital
2022	Pity/Piety: Released: 13 December 2022; Label: Avalanche Recordings (AREC065); Format: Digital
2024	Hard to Reach: Released: 30 January 2024; Label: Avalanche Recordings (AREC073); Format: Digital

== Collections ==
Year	Details
2007	Pale Sketches: Released: 9 October 2007; Label: Avalanche Recordings (AREC008, AREC009), Daymare (DYMC97); Format: CD, vinyl

== Collaborations ==
Year	Details
2016	Jesu/Sun Kil Moon: Released: 21 February 2016; Label: Caldo Verde; Contributing artists: Jesu, Sun Kil Moon
2016	Resolution Heart: Released: 6 May 2016; Label: Tonefloat; Contributing artists: Jesu, Dirk Serries
2017	30 Seconds to the Decline of Planet Earth: Released: 1 June 2017; Label: Caldo Verde; Contributing artists: Jesu, Sun Kil Moon

== Singles ==
Year	Details	Album
2012	Duchess/Veiled: Released: September 2012; Label: Matador (OLE 986–7); Format: Digital	Released as part of the Matador Singles Club
2020	Because of You: Released: June 2020; Label: Avalanche Recordings (AREC048S); Format: Digital	Never
2020	When I Was Small: Released: September 2020; Label: Avalanche Recordings (AREC049S); Format: Digital	Terminus
2020	Alone: Released: October 2020; Label: Avalanche Recordings (AREC049S2); Format: Digital	Terminus

== Cover songs ==
Year	Details	Original artist
2008	"Chapter 24": Released: 23 September 2008; Label: Dwell; Album: Like Black Holes in The Sky: The Tribute to Syd Barrett	Pink Floyd
2008	"The Funeral Party": Released: 28 October 2008; Label: Manimal Vinyl; Album: Perfect As Cats: A Tribute to The Cure; Format: CD, digital	The Cure

== Other appearances ==
- WTUL Songs From The Basement Volume Four - "Your Path To Divinity (WTUL Remix)" exclusive remix track; compilation album (2006)
- Metal Swim - "Dethroned"; Adult Swim compilation album (2010)
- The Space Project - "Song of Earth" exclusive track; Record Store Day compilation release by Lefse Records (2014)
- Say Yes! - "Condor Ave." exclusive track by Jesu & Sun Kil Moon; compilation album release American Laundromat Records (2016)
- 30 Days, 30 Songs - "The Greatest Conversation Ever in the History of the Universe" compilation contribution by Jesu & Sun Kil Moon (2016)

== Remixes ==
- Necessary Intergalactic Cooperation – "Materialismo (Jesu Mix)" (2005) on Teledubgnosis vs. N.I.C.
- Agoraphobic Nosebleed – "Flesh of Jesu Mix" (2006) on PCP Torpedo/ANbRx
- Explosions in the Sky – "The Birth and Death of The Day (Jesu Mix)" (2007) on All of a Sudden I Miss Everyone
- Maninkari – "Participation Mystic (Remix by Jesu)" (2007)
- Fog – "I Have Been Wronged (Jesu Remix)" (2007)
- Pyramids – "The Echo of Something Lovely (Jesu)" (2008) on Pyramids
- School of Seven Bells – "Face To Face on High Places (Jesu Remix)" (2009), also "Instrumental Version"
- Iroha – "Last Day of Summer (Jesu Remix)" (2011)
- Vidna Obmana – "Out from the Garden Reminded" (2011)
- Challenger – "Life in the Paint (Jesu Remix)" (2012)
- Isaurian – "Hologram (Jesu Remix)" (2017)
- Jack Colwell – "Beneather (Jesu Remix)" (2017)
- Oathbreaker – "Ease Me (Jesu Remix)" (2020)
- Interpol – "Toni (Jesu Remix)" (2023)

== Pale Sketcher releases ==
Year	Details	Original album
2010	Jesu: Pale Sketches Demixed: Released: August 2010; Label: Ghostly International (GI-118); Format: CD, digital, vinyl	Remixed version of Pale Sketches
2010	"Can I Go Now (Gone Version)": Released: 10 August 2010; Label: Ghostly International (GI-122); Format: Digital	Jesu: Pale Sketches Demixed
2011	Seventh Heaven: Released: 15 February 2011; Label: Ghostly International (GI-131); Format: Digital, vinyl	
2013	Warm Sunday: Released: 17 June 2013; Label: Heartache Records (001); Format: Digital	
2013	Just Won't Sing: Released: 1 November 2013; Label: Heartache Records (002); Format: Digital	
2013	Golden Skin: Released: 23 September 2022; Label: Give/Take (GT044); Format: CD, digital, vinyl	
