= Diarmuid Dalton =

British musician and songwriter

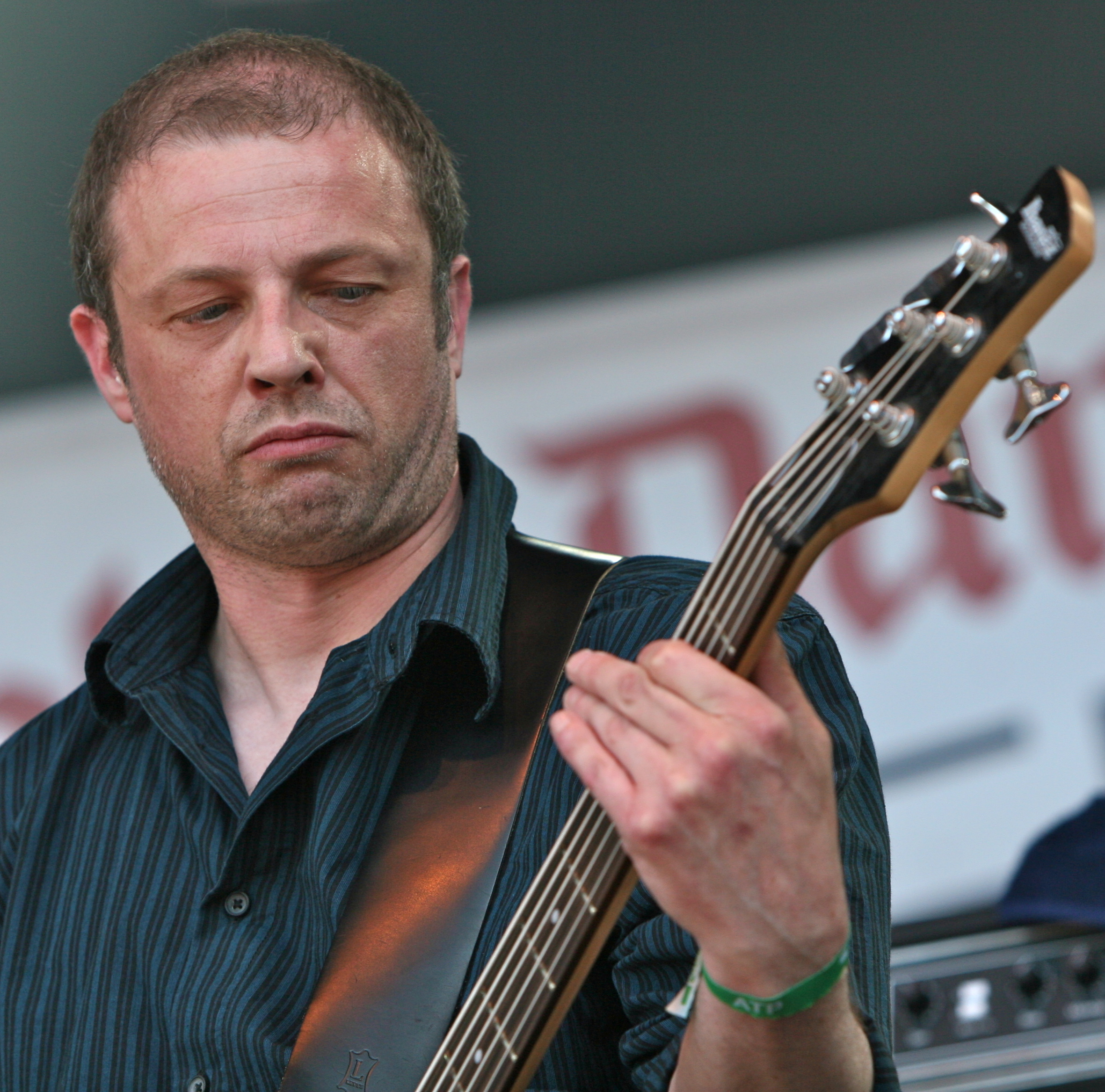
- Diarmuid Dalton performing with Jesu at Primavera Sound in 2009

Background information
- Born: Dublin Ireland
- Origin: Dublin, Ireland
- Genres: Post-metal, shoegazing, drone metal, industrial, experimental
- Occupations: Musician, songwriter
- Instruments: Bass, keyboards
- Years active: 1988–present
- Labels: Avalanche Recordings, Hydra Head
- Member of: Iroha, Council Estate Electronics, Greymachine
- Formerly of: Jesu, Cable Regime, Line, Saskwatch

Diarmuid Dalton is an Irish musician and songwriter. He is best known as the bass guitarist of post-metal bands, Jesu and Iroha. Dalton frequently collaborates with Justin Broadrick, who is the founder of Godflesh and Jesu.

== Biography ==
Irish born, Diarmuid Dalton grew up in Ireland and Birmingham. He was friends with G. C. Green and Paul Neville prior to their involvement with Fall of Because and Godflesh and met with Broadrick in 1984. In between 1988 and 1997, Dalton was a member of the industrial rock group Cable Regime, which featured Neville and Steve Hough. In 1996, he contributed to Broadrick's dark ambient project Final, performing on the albums, 2 (1996) and Solaris (1998). He played Moog synthesizer and electronics on the last track of Godflesh's 2001 studio album, Hymns.

In 2005, Dalton and Swans drummer Ted Parsons joined to Broadrick's post-Godflesh band Jesu, which took its name from the Godflesh track on which he performed. He was initially featured on the band's debut album, Jesu (2004). His further releases with Jesu included Silver EP (2005) and Conqueror (2007), In 2007, Dalton didn't perform at Jesu's North American tour due to being refused a work permit for the United States. For the tour, he was substituted by Dave Cochrane of Head of David and God. Dalton also didn't perform on Ascension (2011) and Everyday I Get Closer to the Light from Which I Came (2013), on which Broadrick played all the instruments.

From the 2006 onwards, Dalton continued to contribute to Final, playing bass on releases such as Guitar & Bass Improvisations album series and Infinite Guitar 3 (2009). In 2008, he joined to English post-metal band Iroha. The band released two albums, Iroha (2011) and Shepherds & Angels (2012). In 2009, he became a member of Greymachine alongside Broadrick and Isis guitarist Aaron Turner. Dalton also releases music under the name Council Estate Electronics with Broadrick.

== Discography ==
With Cable Regime

- Kill Lies All (1993)
- Brave New World (1995)
- Cable Regime (2000)

With Final

- 2 (1996)
- Solaris (1998)
- 3 (2006)
- Guitar & Bass Improvisations Volume 1 (2007)
- Guitar & Bass Improvisations Volume 2 (2007)
- Infinite Guitar 3 (2009)

With Jesu

- Jesu (2004)
- Silver (2005)
- Sun Down/Sun Rise (2007)
- Lifeline (2007)
- Conqueror (2007)

With Iroha

- Iroha (2011)
- Shepherds & Angels (2012)

With Greymachine

- Disconnected (2009)

With Council Estate Electronics

- Kitsland (2009)
- Longmeadow (2012)

Other credits

- Godflesh – Hymns (2001) (synthesizer and electronics on "Jesu")
- Pelican – After the Ceiling Cracked (2008) (live sound technician)
