= Iroha (band) =

English post-metal band

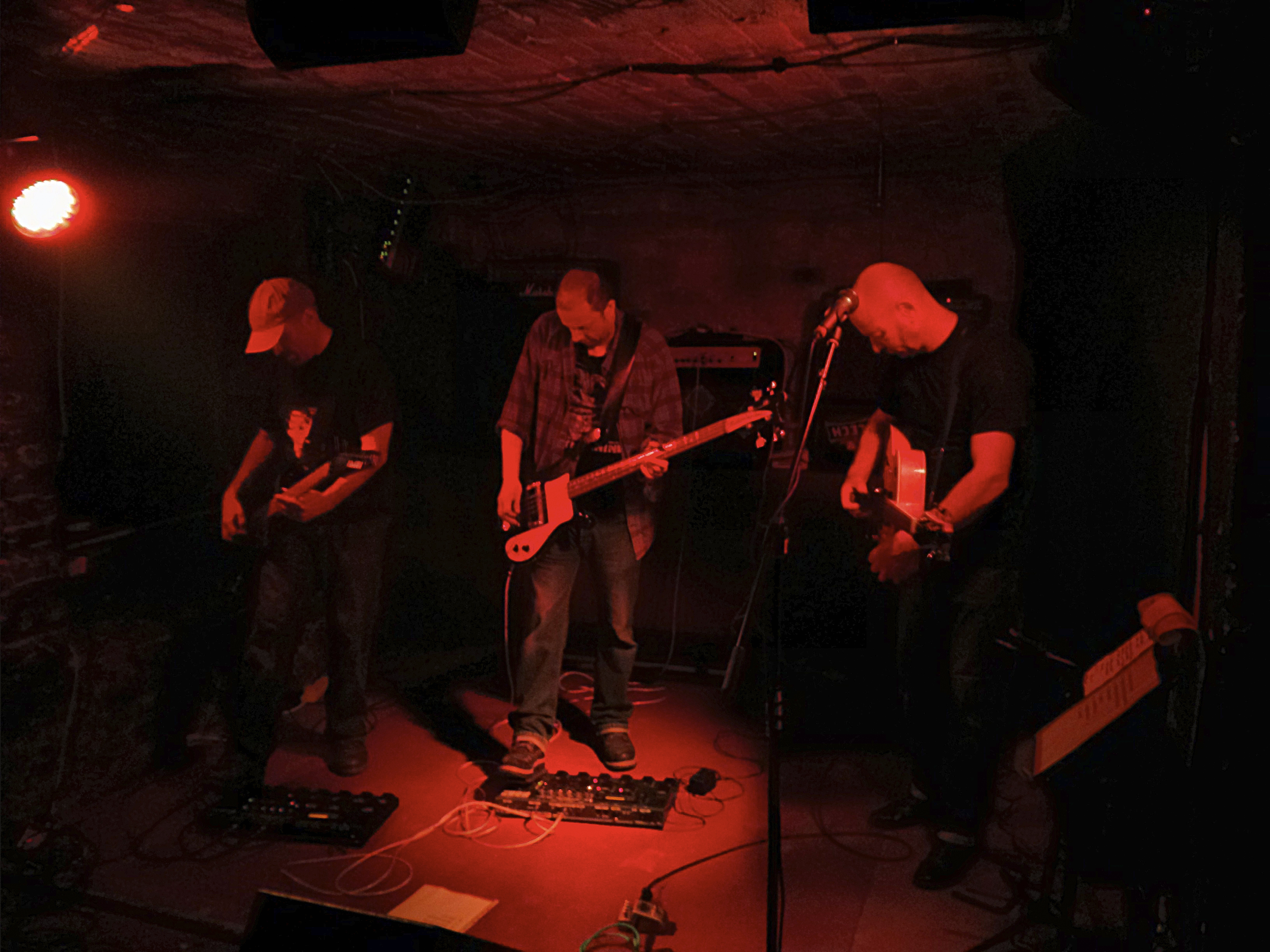
- Iroha, live in Berlin 2013

Background information
- Origin: Birmingham, England
- Genres: Post-metal, shoegazing, sadcore, drone metal
- Years active: 2008–present
- Label: Denovali Records
- Members: Andy Swan; Diarmuid Dalton; Dominic Crane

Iroha are an English post-metal band from Birmingham, West Midlands, formed by former Final member Andy Swan featuring Jesu bassist Diarmuid Dalton and former Rumblefish and Low Art Thrill member, Dominic Crane.

== History ==
Guitarist and vocalist Andy Swan was an original member of Final, an experimental electronics outfit from Birmingham, England. Formed as a duo in 1982, Final (originally as Atrocity Exhibition) also featured Justin Broadrick who went on to be a member of Napalm Death and Head of David before forming the highly influential Godflesh. Final were joined on some recordings by Napalm Death founding member Nicholas Bullen, who also went on to form Scorn. After leaving Final in 1985, Swan switched his attention to the dance scene for the next decade before forming Iroha in 2008.

Bassist Diarmuid Dalton was an original member of Cable Regime and also plays bass in Jesu.

Guitarist and vocalist Dominic Crane was an original member of Rumblefish who released a self-titled album on Atlantic Records imprint East West Records in 1992 and reached No. 34 in the Indie Charts with "Tug Boat Line".

Signed to Denovali Records in 2010, Iroha's first release was a split EP with French artist Fragment. entitled "Bittersweet" and was described by The Sleeping Shaman as "a perfectly balanced, heartbreaking, yet life-affirming, piece of modern music".

Iroha's debut self-titled album was released by Denovali Records in February 2011 followed in September 2011 by a four track EP entitled "End of an Era".

Iroha's second album, Shepherds & Angels, was released on 7 December 2012 via Denovali Records.

== Discography ==
=== Studio albums ===
- Iroha (18 February 2011) Denovali Records
- Shepherds & Angels (7 December 2012) Denovali Records

=== Singles ===
- "Bittersweet" (2010) Denovali Records
- "End of an Era" (2011) Denovali Records
