= Christmas (Jesu EP) =

EP by Jesu
- Released: 9 December 2010 (download); 27 November 2012 (CD and vinyl)
- Genre: Post-metal, drone, ambient
- Length: 28:27 (original) 35:12 (Remaster+)
- Label: Robotic Empire, Avalanche

Jesu chronology
Heart Ache/ Dethroned (2010)	Christmas (2010)	Ascension (2011)

Christmas is the sixth EP release by the post-metal band Jesu. It was released digitally on 9 December 2010, via Avalanche Recordings. The EP contains the track "Christmas", along with two remixes of the song, mixed by Justin Broadrick's side projects Pale Sketcher and Final.

A limited CD and vinyl edition with 500 copies was released by Robotic Empire on 27 November 2012.

According to Broadrick, the EP was inspired by "the onset of the Christmas period and the onset of emotions and feelings of nostalgia, joy and sadness that the period often evokes". The title song, "Christmas", was described as "a frosty, sun-glinted, dreamy, nine-minute snowglobe dirge" by Spin.

== Track listing ==
All tracks are written by Justin Broadrick

No.	Title	Length
1.	"Christmas"	8:44
2.	"Christmas (JK Flesh Remix)" (only on the Remaster+ version)	6:45
3.	"Christmas (Pale Sketcher remix)"	5:32
4.	"Christmas (Final remix)"	14:11
Total length:		35:12
