= Seed State =

Studio album by Head of David
- Released: 1991
- Length: 43:11
- Label: Blast First; Elektra; Mute
- Producer: Paul Kendall

Head of David chronology
White Elephant (1989)	Seed State (1991)	Soul Spark EP (1991)

Seed State is the third and final album by British experimental metal band Head of David, released in 1991. Produced by Paul Kendall, the album was recorded after two of the band members, the bassist Dave Cochrane and the drummer Justin Broadrick, departed to join their respective projects, God and Godflesh. Cochrane was replaced by Bipin Kumar and Broadrick was substituted by a drum machine. The band embarked an accompanying North American tour following the release of the album.

== Critical reception ==
Professional ratings
Review scores
Source	Rating
AllMusic	2.5/5 stars

AllMusic critic Wilson Neate wrote that "the band rarely strays from the same path, laying down rigid, thumping drum programs and heavy, propulsive basslines as a foundation for abrasive guitars and harsh vocals." Neate also thought that "much of this material sounds slightly anachronistic," due to "the omnipresent drum machine."

== Track listing ==
1. "Three Robes, One Bowl" – 0:38
2. "Honey Lives!" – 4:26
3. "How Primitive are You?" – 4:24
4. "Human Feel" – 3:45
5. "Vulture Culture" – 4:32
6. "Kingdom Crawl" – 7:37
7. "Girderland" – 6:55
8. "Zen Walker" – 5:03
9. "Sweetandlovingthing" – 2:36
10. "Wolf" (Joe Walsh cover) – 3:15

== Personnel ==
Album personnel as adapted from album liner notes.

- Bipin Kumar – bass, backing vocals
- Kenneth – assistant engineer
- Eric Jurenovskis – guitar, drum programming
- Paul Kendall – producer, engineer
- Stephen R. Burroughs – vocals
