= The Blood of Heroes (band) =

American drum and bass group

- Origin: New York City, US
- Genres: Drum and bass, metal
- Years active: 2009–present
- Labels: Ohm Resistance
- Members: Justin Broadrick; Dr. Israel; Enduser; Bill Laswell; Submerged
- Past members: Mark Gregor Filip; Balázs Pándi

The Blood of Heroes is a Brooklyn-based drum and bass/metal music project started in 2009. The first incarnation consisted of Submerged, Justin Broadrick, Dr. Israel, Enduser, Mark Gregor Filip, Balázs Pándi, and Bill Laswell. KJ Sawka, Jason Selden, and Tony Maimone have also contributed significantly to the project. As of 2026, they have released three studio albums—The Blood of Heroes (2010), The Waking Nightmare (2012), and Nine Cities (2023); and one remix album, Remain (2010), all via Ohm Resistance.

== History ==
The Blood of Heroes was founded in 2009, taking its name from the 1989 post-apocalyptic movie The Blood of Heroes, starring Rutger Hauer. Their first, self-titled album, was released by Ohm Resistance on April 4, 2010. In 2012, The Waking Nightmare came out and was placed as fourth on The Quietus' "Best Metal of 2013" list.

== Discography ==
Studio albums

- The Blood of Heroes (2010)
- The Waking Nightmare (2012)
- Nine Cities (2023)

Remix albums

- Remain (2010)
