= Submerged (DJ) =

- Born: Kurt Gluck
- Origin: Rosedale, Queens, New York, U.S.
- Genre: Drum and bass
- Occupations: DJ, bassist, record producer, label owner
- Years active: 1999–present
- Labels: Ohm Resistance, Obliterati
- Website: Ohm Resistance

Kurt Gluck known professionally as Submerged is a Brooklyn-based DJ, bassist, founder of the avant-garde drum and bass and experimental music label Ohm Resistance and co-founder of Obliterati, and a prolific multi-genre electronic music producer, first notable for his work with bassist and producer Bill Laswell in creating drum and bass-jazz fusion projects including their band Method of Defiance, and The Blood of Heroes.

In drum and bass, Submerged has pushed the boundaries of the genre beyond dance music through jagged free-form breakbeat structures, historic fusion collaborations with non-drum and bass musicians including Bill Laswell, Pharoah Sanders, Buckethead, and others, as well as publishing confrontational visual artwork.

Submerged performs onstage as a DJ and as a bassist and is a member of avant-garde bands incorporating drum and bass beats and live sound manipulation, such groups including Painkiller and Bill Laswell's project, Method of Defiance. Submerged has also performed live with groups including other artists such as Milford Graves, John Zorn and Toshinori Kondo, and artists Mike Patton and Dr. Israel. He currently collaborates with multi-instrumentalist nem0 in the band You Will Choose Fire, as well as the dark-hop trio, HAVE DEMONS, with Luke Lund.

Submerged has played venues across North America, Europe and Asia, including Russia, Germany, Belgium, Hungary, Ukraine, Kazakhstan, and the UK.

He toured with Scorn in 2011 across Europe.

== Background ==
Gluck was born in Rosedale, Queens, New York. His father was a Brooklyn police officer and his mother an worked at an architecture firm.

Gluck played clarinet and bass clarinet in his school jazz band and symphonic band. “I always took band classes because I loved playing music. I had my own metal band in high school. I wrestled (folkstyle) for four years varsity, but I was really into music. I listened mostly to metal. I didn’t start to get into electronic music heavily till my summer after high school. My favourite bands were Slayer, Napalm Death. Godflesh was huge to me, also.”

In 1999 he founded Ohm Resistance, a collective of musicians and DJs on two continents, which was also a label that released progressive Washington, DC artists including Sinthetix, Impulse, Kiko, MC Mecha, and Skynet. For one year, Ohm Resistance threw a Wednesday weekly called Tangent at the U-Turn club.

Submerged moved Ohm's headquarters to Brooklyn in late 2002 to facilitate global distribution of its releases. In 2003 he co-created a second label, Obliterati, to pursue the darker and more experimental roots of Ohm Resistance.

In 2003, Laswell met with Submerged to discuss working together and said he owed John Zorn a record. Submerged came up with eight compositions to which Laswell added more music and live bass. This first historic drum and bass-jazz fusion collaboration by Bill Laswell and Submerged, “Brutal Calling,” was released on Zorn's Avant label in the first half of 2004.

In 2005, Laswell and Submerged as Method of Defiance released a 9-track album, “The Only Way to Go Is Down,” on Sublight Records.

In 2007, Method of Defiance released an album called Inamorata, a fusion of drum and bass and jazz music, with the collaboration of many artists from the drum and bass and jazz scenes.

Alex Henderson of All Music Guide described Submerged's Violence as First Nature (2008) double-CD release as "forceful, abrasive, confrontational stuff" and compared his work to "industrial rockers like Ministry, Skinny Puppy, and the Revolting Cocks (as well as hip-hop agitators Public Enemy)."

In April 2010, Submerged project The Blood of Heroes released its self-titled debut on Ohm Resistance - a collaboration project featuring Justin Broadrick (Godflesh, Jesu, Napalm Death) and Bill Laswell, with beats from Submerged and End.user and vocals from Doctor Israel, described in an album review as follows: "Post apocalyptic soundscapes and de-imaged electronic beats backed up with heavy guitar and bass. Features live drumming from KJ Sawka and Balazs Pandi, and sound design from film sound architect M. Gregor Filip. Powerful anthemic tracks collide with vicious drum n bass beatdowns and intersperse with breathtaking synth beauty and Aphex Twin style mezzed beats. The soundtrack to post-solarflare humanity!"

In 2016, Submerged moved to the Pacific Northwest and started a shoegaze-influenced live drum and bass band called You Will Choose Fire with multi-instrumentalist nem0. They have toured in the US and Ukraine.

== Discography ==
=== Albums ===
- Submerged – Stars Lights The End (Sublight Records, 2007)
- Submerged with Bill Laswell as Method of Defiance – The Only Way To Go Is Down (Sublight Records, 2006)
- Submerged with Bill Laswell as part of Laswell's Method of Defiance – Inamorata (Columbia Music Entertainment, 2008, first release 2006)
- Bill Laswell vs. Submerged – Brutal Calling (Avant, 2004)
- Graham Haynes vs Submerged – Echolocation (Burning Ambulance Music, 2021)

=== EPs ===
- You Will Choose Fire – self-titled (Ohm Resistance, 2017)

=== Mixed Albums ===
- Submerged – Violence As First Nature (Ohm Resistance, 2008) (drum 'n' bass, breakcore, experimental)

=== Ohm Resistance releases ===
- 1M OHM; Various – Forwards In Backwards Time (2xCD) (2004)
- 2M OHM; Sinthetix Gateway (2xCD, Ltd; 2006)
- 3M OHM; Black Sun Empire – Cruel & Unusual (2xCD; 2005)
- 5M OHM; Method Of Defiance Inamorata (CD, album, digital; 2007) (see track list above)
- 5M OHM; Method Of Defiance Inamorata LP sampler (12", W/Lbl, promo; 2008)
- 6M OHM; Scorn (band) Stealth (CD, album) (2007)
- 7M OHM; End.user* Left (CD, album; 2008)
- 8M OHM; Fanu + Bill Laswell Lodge (CD, album, digital; 2008)
- 9M OHM; Technical Itch You Need Therapy (CD, compilation, mixed; 2008)
- 10MOHM; Submerged Violence As First Nature (CD, album + CD, mixed; 2008) (see track list above)
- 11MOHM; Silent Killer Everyone Bleeds (CD, album; 2009)
- 12MOHM; The Project_Pale – Our Inventions and How They Fail Us
- 13MOHM; S.S.T – Stepping Through Shadows (CD, album; 2010)
- 14MOHM; The Blood Of Heroes – The Blood of Heroes (CD, album; 2010)
- 15M OHM; Imaginary Forces (2) – Filth Columnist (CD, album; 2010)
- 16M OHM; Scorn Refuse; Start Fires (album; 2 versions; 2010)
- 17M OHM; Necessary* Voldsløkka (album; 2 versions; 2010)
- 18M OHM; Silent Killer & Breaker Amongst Villains (2x12"; 2010)
- 18M OHM; Silent Killer & Breaker Amongst Villains (CD, album; 2010)
- 18M OHM; Silent Killer & Breaker Amongst Villains (12"; 2010)
- 19M OHM; The Blood Of Heroes Remain (CD, album; 2010)
- 20K OHM; Submerged / end.user Servant (Technical Itch Remix) / The Return (Ohm Resistance VIP)
- 21K OHM; Counterstrike / Identity / Corrupt Souls / Lethal & Khanage Disciples of the Unreal
- 22M OHM; Submerged Before Fire I Was Against Other People (CD, digital; 3/29/2011)
- 23K OHM; Lethal & Khanage / Identity & 4Pro Project X / Snap
- 24K OHM; Lethal & Khanage / Temulent Fuck You! / Nothing (Ohmwreckers Part 4)
- 25K OHM; Infiltrata / Breaker / Identity Make Life Illa / I’ve Given Up The Hammer for the Hatchet (Ohmwreckers Part 5)
- 26K OHM; Submerged ft. Corrupt Souls / C.A.B.L.E. Gutter / One More Time (Ohmwreckers Part 6)
- 27K OHM; Silent Killer + Breaker Endure / Brigade (Ohmwreckers Part 7)
- 28K OHM; SST & Glitch / The Chosen Let It Bleed / Faith Of The Fallen
