= Why Are We Not Perfect? =

EP by Jesu
- Released: 19 August 2008
- Genre: Post-rock, shoegaze, ambient
- Length: 36:30
- Label: Hydra Head Records
- Producer: Justin Broadrick

Jesu chronology
Jesu / Battle of Mice (2008)	Why Are We Not Perfect? (2008)	Infinity (2009)

Professional ratings
Review scores
Source	Rating
The Aquarian Weekly	A−
The Fader	favorable
Pitchfork	(5.6)

Why Are We Not Perfect? is the fifth EP release by the post-metal band Jesu. It was released on 19 August 2008 via Hydra Head Records.

The EP contains Jesu's tracks from the band's split with the ambient musician Eluvium, named Jesu / Eluvium, along with an alternative version for the each song.

On 9 September the EP was streamed online via the official website of the record.

According to Robbie Mackey of Pitchfork, the EP shows a further departure from the band's post-metal style in favor of an exploration of melodic shoegazing sound and occasional trip hop elements. The album was also compared to Slowdive's works. Jason Jackowokiak of The Fader also noted that the alternative version of "Farewell" could be "the most serene track Broadrick’s ever committed to tape" with its "a loping miasma of distant voices, splintered harmonium drones and stuttering breakbeats."

== Track listing ==
1. "Farewell" - 6:32
2. "Blind and Faithless" - 3:33
3. "Why Are We Not Perfect" - 6:48
4. "Farewell (Alternative version)" - 6:45
5. "Why Are We Not Perfect (Alternative version) - 6:50
6. "Blind and Faithless (Alternative version)" - 6:22†

† indicates a track exclusive to the Japanese edition of the album.

== Personnel ==
The personnel, as adapted from Discogs:

- Justin Broadrick - vocals, instruments, programming, composition, mixing, production
- Aaron Turner - art direction
- James O'Mara - layout and construction
- John Golden - mastering
- Jason Hellmann - photography
