= Envy/Jesu =

Album by Envy

Studio album by Envy and Jesu
- Released: July 11, 2008 (Japan); July 26, 2009 (US)
- Genre: Electronica, post-rock, hardcore punk
- Length: 37:11
- Label: Daymare (DYMC-066); Conspiracy Records (CORE068); Hydra Head Records (HH666-169)

Envy chronology
Abyssal (2007)	Envy/Jesu (2008)	Thursday / Envy (2008)

Jesu chronology
Lifeline (EP) (2007)	Envy / Jesu (2008)	Jesu/Battle of Mice (2008)

Professional ratings
Review scores
Source	Rating
Alternative Press	link

Envy/Jesu is a split EP between Japanese hardcore band Envy and Justin Broadrick's Jesu. It was originally released in Japan by Daymare in 2008. Conspiracy Records released a 12" vinyl version, limited to 2,000 copies in white, transparent blue, gold and silver.

Hydra Head Records re-released the album in North America on July 26, 2009. Hydra Head also released a double 10" vinyl edition in September, 2009.

The album artwork was designed by Aaron Turner.

On January 30, 2024, Broadrick released the Hard to Reach EP digitally via the Jesu Bandcamp page. The five-song EP features remastered version of the two Jesu tracks featured on the Envy/Jesu album, as well as an alternative version of "Hard to Reach", as well as two bonus tracks that were originally considered for inclusion on the original release had it not been a split EP.

== Track listing ==
Side A

1. Envy – "Conclusion of Existence" (5:58)
2. Envy – "A Winter Quest for Fantasy" (6:25)
3. Envy – "Life Caught in the Rain" (4:25)

Side B

1. Jesu – "Hard to Reach" (13:39)
2. Jesu – "The Stars That Hang Above You" (7:35)
