= Final (band) =

Electronic music projectl

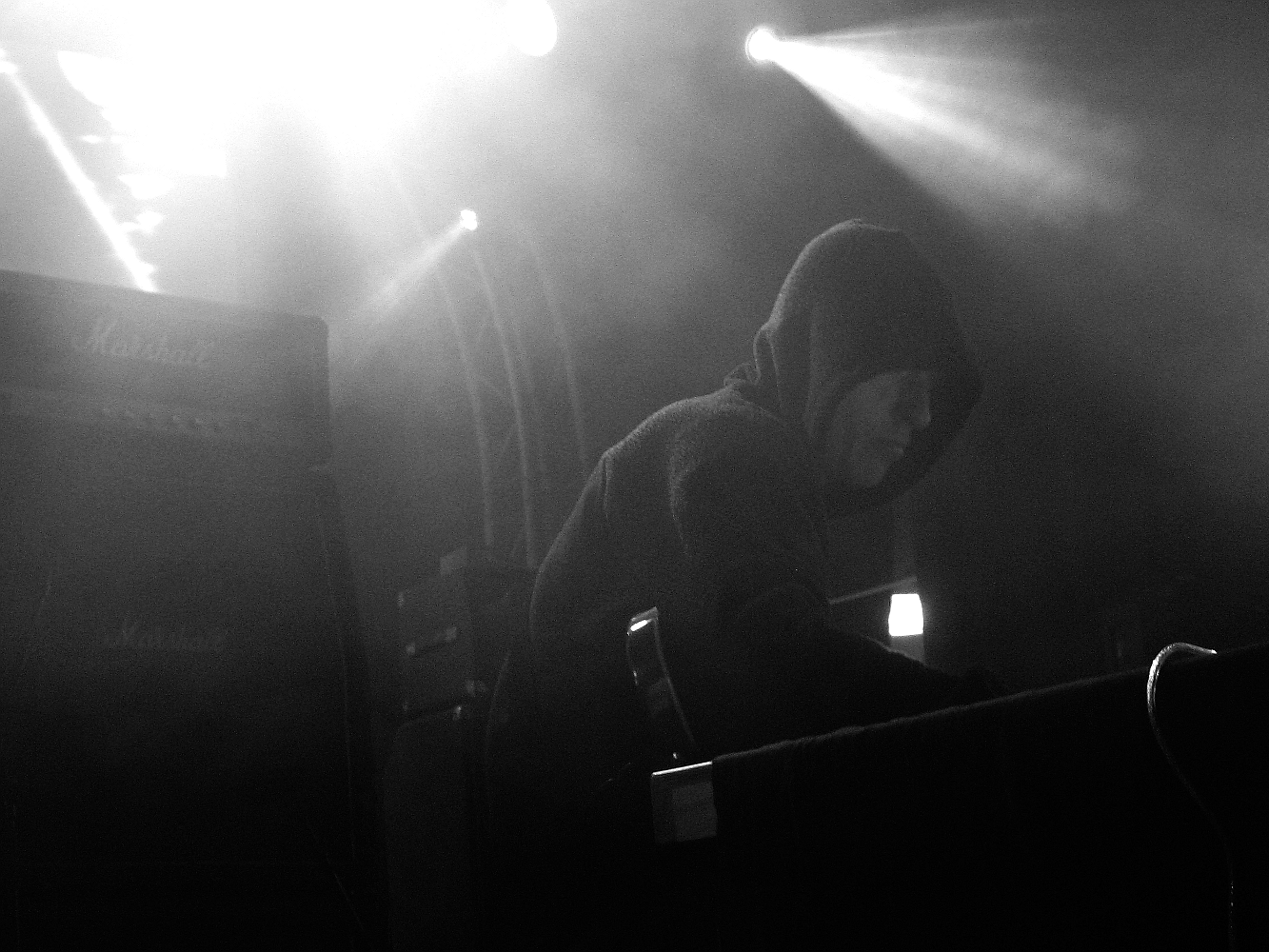
- Justin Broadrick performing as Final, 2012

Background information
- Also known as: Atrocity Exhibition (1982–1983); Smear Campaign (1983–1984)
- Origin: Birmingham, England, UK
- Genres: Power electronics; industrial music; Drone music; ambient; dark ambient
- Years active: 1982–1986; 1993–present
- Labels: Avalanche; Post Mortem Sentrax; Neurot
- Members: Justin Broadrick
- Past members: Andrew Swan

Final is a project of English musician Justin Broadrick, creator of the band Godflesh, which he started when he was 13 years old. Unlike Godflesh, Final is primarily electronic in nature, taking on a space-like, dark ambient sound.

== History ==
Originally project was formed in 1982 as a power electronics/industrial duo of Justin Broadrick and Andy Swan (who Broadrick met at the city's Rag Market and both shared an interest in power electronics and industrial bands such as Throbbing Gristle, Ramleh and Whitehouse) under name Atrocity Exhibition. The duo released cassettes on Post Mortem Rekordings, Justin Broadrick's own cassette label (started in 1982 and ended in 1986). Later in 1983, the duo changed their name to Smear Campaign, and first performed live on 7 July 1984 in The Mermaid Pub in Birmingham, using Broadrick's stepfather's shortwave radio and distortion pedals. The played at the pub alongside Con-Dom and Family Patrol Group and was briefly signed on The Grey Wolves's label, changing their name to Final after this show.

Beginning in 1982, Broadrick released over fifty tapes through his Post Mortem Rekordings label until 1986, many of which were Final tapes. Other contributors during this period included Guy Pearce, Nicholas Bullen (of Scum fame), Kevin Johnson, and Paul Neville. The music from this period is expected to receive a boxset reissue on Hospital Productions. In 1986, Final went on hiatus while Justin Broadrick played in Napalm Death and Head of David and later co-founded Godflesh. Andy Swan would later go on to form the bands Iroha and Khost, both of which Broadrick has remixed songs for.

Final was revived in 1993 as an experimental ambient solo project of Justin Broadrick meant to "explore beat-less spaces" and focus on textures, now expanding its influences to the likes of Brian Eno and Maurizio Bianchi. This new incarnation started utilizing electric guitar, tape decks, synthesizers and samplers. One was released on Sentrax and Subharmonic and was Final's first ever CD release. 2 (1996) and 3 (2006), which both compiled pieces recorded over several years, were collaborations with Broadrick's bass players: Godflesh's G. C. Green and Jesu's Diarmuid Dalton respectively. Two series of live improvised music were self released under the Final name on Avalanche Recordings, Infinite Guitar (2007-2009) and Guitar & Bass Improvisations (2007-2013). A collaborative avant-garde drone album with Dirk Serries was also released in 2009, Final + Fear Falls Burning.

Final played its first live show in twenty years as support for The Living Jarboe in 2005, with a laptop as the only instrument. A European tour followed in 2006 alongside L'Enfance Rouge and a further show was played later that year at Supersonic Festival and as support for Isis at All Tomorrow's Parties. One-off shows were played in Birmingham in 2009, during Broadrick's Roadburn Festival residence in 2012 and as a double bill with the live debut of Council Estate Electronics in 2014. The Birmingham show saw a Bandcamp release as Live Reprocessed (2016). Dalton assisted Broadrick on some of these dates. Final played its first ever United States show on 8 December 2018 at Hospital Fest in Queens, New York City.

== Members ==
Current lineup

- Justin Broadrick (1982–1986, 1993–present)

Former members

- Andy Swan (1982–1986)

Former touring musicians and collaborators

- Philip Timms
- Daniel Johnson
- Paul Neville
- Nicholas Bullen (1983, 1984)
- Graham Robertson
- Kevin Johnson
- Guy Pearce
- G.C. Green (1995–1998)
- Diarmuid Dalton (1995–1996, 2006–2009)

== Discography ==
=== Studio albums ===
- One (CD 1993; CD 1994)
- 2 (CD 1996)
- The First Millionth of a Second (CD 1997)
- 3 (2xCD 2006)
- Fade Away (Digital 2008)
- :Afar: (LP & Digital 2008) - limited Picture Disc of 500 copies
- Dead Air (CD 2008)
- Reading All The Right Signals Wrong (LP & CD 2009)
- Infinite Guitar 3 / Guitar & Bass Improvisations 3 (2xCD & Digital 2009)
- The Apple Never Falls Far From The Tree (2xLP 2010)
- Burning Bridges Will Light Your Way (Digital 2012)
- Infinite Guitar 4 (3xCDr & Digital 2013)
- Black Dollars (2xLP & Digital 2015) - expanded reissue of My Body is a Dying Machine EP
- Expect Nothing and the Kingdom Will Be Yours (Digital 2022)
- It Comes To Us All (CD, LP, & Digital 2022)
- I Am the Dirt Under Your Fingernails (CD & LP 2022)
- Ravine Of Spears (with Richard Ramirez) (LP and Digital) (2023)
- What We Don't See (CD & Digital 2024)
- Giving Up, One Day At A Time (Digital 2025)

=== Singles and EPs ===
- Flow / Openings (7" 1995) - limited release of 1,000 copies
- Solaris (CD EP 1996, CD EP 1998) - the 1998 reissue by Invisible Records features one bonus track
- Urge / Fail (7" 1996) - limited release of 250 copies
- My Body is a Dying Machine (Digital 2010)
- You Couldn't Mean Any Less (Digital 2020)
- Oblivion Vol 1 (Digital 2021)
- Oblivion Vol 2 (Digital 2022)
- Oblivion Vol 3 (Digital) (2022)
- Oblivion 0 (Digital) (2023)

=== Live albums ===
- Live Reprocessed | Birmingham 2009 (Digital 2016)
- Live Marseille 2006 (CDr & Digital 2019)
- Live Incubate (Digital 2020)

=== Sets and compilations ===
- Infinite Guitar 1 & 2 / Guitar & Bass Improvisations Vol 1 & 2 (4xCDr 2008)
- Origins 1983-87 (5xCD) (TBA) - forthcoming box set of cassette recordings chosen by Justin Broadrick

=== Collaborations ===
- Final + Fear Falls Burning (album with Dirk Serries) (LP & Digital 2009)
- Fear Falls Burning vs Final (track with Dirk Serrie) on Fear Falls Burning – Once We All Walk Through Solid Objects) (5xLP & Digital 2014)

=== Other releases ===
- Desquamation (Cassette) (1983)
- Exterpite (Cassette) (1983)
- A Final Process Of Elimination (Cassette) (1984)
- Assault (Cassette) (1984)
- Live Mission 1 (Cassette) (1984)
- Live Mission 2 (Cassette) (1984)
- Smear Atrocity (Cassette) (1984)
- Maximum Hatred (Cassette 1985)
- Fight Back (Cassette) (1985)
- Live Mission 3 (Cassette) (1985)
- Live Mission 4 (Cassette) (1985)
- Live Mission 5 (Cassette) (1985)
- To The Desinfectionraum (Cassette) (1985)
- Inheritance (Cassette 1986)
- Execution Of The Will (Cassette 1986)
- Failure (Digital 2005) - outtake from the 3 album available only through Final's official website
- Infinite Guitar 1 (CDr 2007, Digital 2012) - CDr limited release of 150 copies
- Infinite Guitar 2 (CDr 2007, Digital 2012) - CDr limited release of 150 copies
- Guitar & Bass Improvisations Volume 1 (CDr 2007, Digital 2012) - CDr limited release of 150 copies
- Guitar & Bass Improvisations Volume 2 (CDr 2007, Digital 2012) - CDr limited release of 150 copies

=== Exclusive songs on compilations ===
- "Exist" on Power And Control (Cassette 1984)
- "Blood Love" on Power And Control (Cassette 1984)
- "Vomit Eat" on International Sound Communication 2 (Cassette 1985)
- "A Message To Man" on International Sound Communication 6 (Cassette 1985)
- "I Am Pt 2" on Thee Anal Probe Archives 10th Anniversary Retro (Cassette 1985/1986)
- "Belief" on Carnage In A Country Garden (Cassette 1986) and on Thee Anal Probe Archives 10th Anniversary Retro (Cassette 1985/1986)
- "Inheritance" on Cultural Terror Volume One & Two - A Zeal SS Sampler (Cassette 1986)
- "Execution Of The Will" on Cultural Terror Volume One & Two - A Zeal SS Sampler (Cassette 1986)
- "Crimes Pt.2" on Belial (Cassette 1986)
- "Thumbscrew" on Belial (Cassette 1986)
- "Processor Remix" on Destined To Decay (Cassette 1986)
- "Desquamation Live Mission 2" on Destined To Decay (Cassette 1986)
- "Dream 1-3" on Shrine (CD 1993)
- "Hide" on Ambient 4: Isolationism (CD 1994)
- "Alien Soundtracks" on Indiscreet Stereo Test Record (CD 1995)
- "Exit" on Endless 2 (CD 1995)
- "Voidbeat 1" on Fear Drop 3 (CD 1997) - track credited as Final Vs. Solaris
- "Sticks & Stones" on The Lo Fibre Companion (2xCD 1998)
- "Two Chords" on Strings & Stings: A 100% Guitar Compilation (CD 1999)
- "Far" on Fear Drop 7 (CD 2000)
- "The End Has Come" on HHR Vs 2xH Vol 1 "Where Is My Robotic Boot?" (2xCD 2004)
- "4AM Internal" on Fabriksampler V2 (CD 2008)
- "Pripyat Funfair" on Ominous Silence Compilation 2012 (Digital 2012)
- "Dedicated To Greenland" on Fear Drop 17 (CD 2014)
