= Opiate Sun =

EP by Jesu
- Released: 27 October 2009
- Recorded: May–June 2009, Avalanche
- Genre: Post-metal, shoegazing
- Length: 25:54
- Label: Caldo Verde Records
- Producer: Justin Broadrick

Jesu chronology
Infinity (2009)	Opiate Sun (2009)	Heart Ache/ Dethroned (2010)

Professional ratings
Review scores
Source	Rating
Allmusic	3.5/5 stars
Pitchfork Media	(7.0/10)
PopMatters	(9/10)

Opiate Sun is the fifth EP and tenth overall release by Jesu. It was released in America through Mark Kozelek's Caldo Verde label on 27 October 2009. Kozelek had been impressed by Justin Broadrick's performance when he saw him live in San Francisco in 2007, and approached Broadrick about putting a release out on Caldo Verde. Daymare Recordings released the album in Japan on 6 November 2009. The Daymare version of the album contains an exclusive bonus track.

Broadrick had originally mentioned the EP in 2008 but a title and official release date had yet to be announced. It was later announced that Opiate Sun, would be released in July 2009, although that date was later rescheduled.

Initially, the EP was intended to be the first studio recording to include the lineup of Justin Broadrick, Dave Cochrane, and Phil Petrocelli. This lineup was to be featured on two of the four tracks, with the classic lineup of Broadrick, Ted Parsons, and Diarmuid Dalton performing the other two tracks. The released version of the album features Broadrick performing solo.

== Track listing ==
All songs written and performed by Justin K. Broadrick.

1. "Losing Streak" – 6:15
2. "Opiate Sun" – 7:09
3. "Deflated" – 6:59
4. "Morning Light" – 5:31
5. "Deflated" (Demo Version) – 7:02 †

† indicates a track exclusive to the Japanese edition of the album.

== Personnel ==
- Justin Broadrick – guitar, vocals, programming, production
- Nyree Watts – photography
- Brian Azer – sleeve design

== Release history ==
Country	Date	Label	Format	Catalogue #	Notes
United States	27 October 2009	Caldo Verde Records	CD	CDCV009	Released in a digipak
United States	November 2009	Aural Exploits/Caldo Verde	12" vinyl	AELP3002	Pressed on five colour variations: black, blue haze, red, red haze, and yellow haze
Japan	6 November 2009	CD	Daymare Recordings	DYMC-110	Includes an exclusive bonus track
