= Lifeline (EP) =

EP by Jesu
- Released: (Japan) 4 October 2007 (United States) 23 October 2007
- Genre: Post-metal, experimental rock, shoegazing, ambient
- Length: 23:07
- Label: Hydra Head Records (CD) (HH666-127); Daymare (CD) (DYMC-044)
- Producer: Justin Broadrick

Jesu chronology
Pale Sketches (2007)	Lifeline (2007)	Envy/Jesu (Split EP) (2008)

Professional ratings
Review scores
Source	Rating
Allmusic	3.5/5 stars

Lifeline is the fourth EP and eighth overall release by Jesu. It was released on CD on 4 October 2007 in Japan, and 23 October 2007 in America. In 2009, popular music publication Pitchfork Media cited "Lifeline" as "the best non-collaborative release in Broadrick's unwieldy discography."

== Track listing ==
1. "Lifeline" - 5:17
2. "You Wear Their Masks" - 6:18
3. "Storm Comin' On" - 5:58
4. "End of the Road" - 5:34
5. "Lifeline" (Alternate Version) - 5:23 †
6. "Decide" (Alternate Version of "Storm Comin' On") - 5:54 †

† indicates a track exclusive to the Japanese edition of the album.

== Personnel ==
- Justin Broadrick – guitars/vocals/programming
- Diarmuid Dalton – bowed bass guitar ("Storm Comin' On")
- Ted Parsons - drums ("Storm Comin' On")
- Jarboe - vocals ("Storm Comin' On")
