= Heart Ache/Dethroned =

- The Heart Ache side of the CD gatefold compilation. Photograph by Justin Broadrick, photo treatment by Faith Coloccia.

Compilation album by Jesu
- Released: 16 November 2010
- Recorded: 2004–2010
- Genre: Post-metal; drone metal; experimental metal; industrial metal; shoegaze; ambient
- Length: 68:19
- Label: Hydra Head (HH666–197)
- Producer: Justin Broadrick

Jesu chronology
Opiate Sun (2009)	Heart Ache/Dethroned (2010)	Christmas (2010)

Professional ratings
Aggregate scores
Source	Rating
Metacritic	79/100
Review scores
Source	Rating
Allmusic	4/5 stars
The A.V. Club	A−
Pitchfork	7.6/10.0
PopMatters	6/10
Punknews.org	3.5/5 stars
Spin	8/10

Heart Ache/Dethroned is a double EP release by the Welsh band Jesu. Released on 16 November 2010 through Hydra Head Records, it combines the band's out-of-print, debut 2004 EP Heart Ache with a previously unreleased EP titled Dethroned. Jesu founder, Justin Broadrick, began working on Dethroned around the same time as Heart Ache in 2004, but it was not completed until 2010. Broadrick said the release of Dethroned took so long because he didn't want it to be a stand-alone EP and was waiting for the right album with which to combine it. Broadrick chose a reissue of Heart Ache to pair with Dethroned because they were written around the same period and contained similarities to his previous band, Godflesh. He said, "Both Heart Ache and Dethroned, for me, contain a huge amount of Godflesh to some extent, it's that period when the ghost of Godflesh still somewhat influenced the Jesu sound and songwriting."

Heart Ache/Dethroned scored a 79/100 on Metacritic based on 8 critics, indicating "generally favorable reviews". Thom Jurek of Allmusic gave the album four out of five stars stating that, "What the Dethroned half of this nearly 70-minute set reveals is that Jesu is still breaking new ground. Contrasted with Heart Ache, this new double EP is an excellent introductory portrait of the project, past and present." While Leor Galil of PopMatters gave the album a 6/10 stating that, "Combining a brilliant debut with some never-heard, once-unfinished songs is clearly a move made with diehard Jesu fans in mind. But, for the curious and casual music listeners, it's the record's shorter songs that, oddly enough, are the least listenable."

== Track listing ==
All songs written by Jesu.

=== Disc 1: Heart Ache ===
1. "Heart Ache" – 19:42
2. "Ruined" – 20:14

=== Disc 2: Dethroned ===
1. "Dethroned" – 7:12
2. "Annul" – 7:16
3. "Aureated Skin" – 6:46
4. "I Can Only Disappoint You" – 7:09

==== Japanese bonus track ====
5. "I Can Only Disappoint You" (extended dub) – 9:42

== Personnel ==
Heart Ache/Dethroned adapted from CD liner notes.

=== Jesu ===
- Justin Broadrick – all instruments, vocals

=== Production ===
- Justin Broadrick – production, mixing

=== Artwork ===
- Justin Broadrick – photography
- Aaron Turner – design
- Faith Coloccia – photo treatments, design assistance
