= Valley of Fear (album) =

Studio album by Valley of Fear
- Released: 13 April 2012
- Genre: Noise rock; black metal
- Length: 30:26
- Label: Legion Blotan
- Producer: Justin Broadrick, M.J. Bower, S.J. Davies

Valley of Fear is the only album from English noise group Valley of Fear, released on 13 April 2012. The band was composed of Godflesh front man Justin Broadrick, Skullflower founder Matthew Bower, and Skullflower member Samantha Davies. Kez Whelan of Terrorizer described Valley of Fear as "densely textured black metal".

Limited to only five hundred copies, Valley of Fear was released exclusively as a CD. In keeping with the sparseness of the music, the physical release is notably bereft of information. Aside from the list of members and the album's title, documentation is scant; nothing about a record label, a studio, a producer, or even a product code is recorded.

== Track listing ==
All tracks are written by J.K. Broadrick, S.J. Davies, M.J. Bower

No.	Title	Length
1.	"Serpent's Trail"	8:03
2.	"Ourobous" (sole release includes typo of 'ouroboros')	5:30
3.	"Naga"	4:34
4.	"The Exit Door Leads in"	12:17
Total length:		30:26

== Personnel ==
- J.K. Broadrick – guitar, bass, rhythm machine
- S.J. Davies – guitar, bass
- M.J. Bower – guitar
