= Ascension (Jesu album) =

Studio album by Jesu
- Released: 10 May 2011
- Recorded: 2010–2011 at Avalanche
- Genre: Post-metal, shoegazing
- Length: 61:34
- Label: Caldo Verde (CV013)
- Producer: Justin Broadrick

Jesu chronology
Christmas (2010)	Ascension (2011)	Everyday I Get Closer to the Light from Which I Came (2013)

Professional ratings
Aggregate scores
Source	Rating
Metacritic	75/100
Review scores
Source	Rating
AllMusic	3.5/5 stars
The A.V. Club	A
Consequence of Sound	4/5 stars
The Guardian	4/5 stars
Metal Storm	8.3/10
Pitchfork Media	7.0/10
PopMatters	7/10
Prefix Magazine	7.0/10
Revolver	3.5/5
Rock Sound	9/10 stars

Ascension is the third studio album by the British post-metal band Jesu. The album was released on 10 May 2011 through Caldo Verde Records. Ascension is the first full-length studio album released by Jesu since 2007's Conqueror. On 8 June 2011, Daymare Recordings released the album in Japan with a bonus disc containing four additional tracks unavailable on the original release. In August 2018, the album was reissued on vinyl via American record label Robotic Empire and featured brand new mixes for each song by Justin Broadrick, as well as new mastering provided by John Golden of Golden Mastering.

== Track listing ==
No.	Title	Length
1.	"Fools"	8:12
2.	"Birth Day"	5:09
3.	"Sedatives"	5:10
4.	"Broken Home"	8:52
5.	"Brave New World"	4:13
6.	"Black Lies"	5:27
7.	"Small Wonder"	7:31
8.	"December"	7:51
9.	"King of Kings"	6:24
10.	"Ascension"	2:45
Total length:		61:34

Japanese edition only bonus disc
No.	Title	Length
1.	"Fools" (Alternative version)	8:07
2.	"Birth Day" (Alternative version)	5:08
3.	"King of Kings" (Alternative version)	6:43
4.	"King of Pride"	6:53
Total length:		26:50

== Personnel ==
- Justin Broadrick – guitars, bass, vocals, keyboards
- Ted Parsons – drums, percussion
