= Jesu/Eluvium =

EP by Jesu and Eluvium
- Released: July 5, 2007
- Genres: Electronica, post-rock, ambient
- Labels: Hydra Head Records (12") (HH666-136); Temporary Residence (12") (TRR126)

Eluvium chronology
| Copia (2007) | Jesu/Eluvium (2007) | Similes (2010) |

Jesu chronology
| Sun Down / Sun Rise (EP) (2007) | Jesu / Eluvium (2007) | Pale Sketches (2007) |

Professional ratings
Review scores
| Source | Rating |
|---|---|
| Scene Point Blank | 8.7 stars on a 10 point scale |
| Sonic Frontiers | 6.7/10 |

Jesu/Eluvium is a split LP between Justin Broadrick's Jesu and Matthew Cooper's Eluvium. It was released through Hydra Head Records on July 5, 2007. The album was recorded at Broadrick's own Avalanche Studio. Broadrick and Cooper wrote, recorded and mixed their respective tracks with John Golden mastering all tracks. Broadrick featured the tracks he had produced later on the Jesu release Why Are We Not Perfect?.

== Track listing ==
Side A

1. Jesu – "Farewell" (6:26)
2. Jesu – "Blind & Faithless" (3:31)
3. Jesu – "Why Are We Not Perfect?" (6:43)

Side B

1. Eluvium – "Time-Travel of the Sloth Parts I, II, & III" (19:56)
