= Silver (EP) =

EP by Jesu
- Released: 11 April 2006
- Recorded: 2004–2005
- Studio: Avalanche
- Genres: Post-metal; shoegaze
- Length: 28:39
- Labels: Hydra Head Records (CD) (HH666-110); Daymare (CD) (DYMC002); Conspiracy (12" vinyl) (Core032)
- Producer: Justin Broadrick

Jesu chronology
Jesu (2004)	Silver (2006)	Conqueror (2007)

Professional ratings
Review scores
Source	Rating
AbsolutePunk.net	(95%) link
AllMusic	link
Pitchfork Media	(7.9/10) link

Silver is the second EP by Jesu, their third release overall, released by Hydra Head Records on 11 April 2006. This album shows a more melodic and poppy side to the band than the previous two Jesu releases, drawing comparisons to shoegazing bands such as My Bloody Valentine and Ride. Pitchfork Media placed the title track at number 488 on their "The Top 500 Tracks of the 2000s" list. Decibel ranked the EP the 6th best release of 2006 and the 26th best release of the decade.

The Japanese edition of this album contains two additional mixes of the songs "Silver" and "Wolves".

== Track listing ==
1. "Silver" – 6:44
2. "Star" – 7:00
3. "Wolves" – 8:27
4. "Dead Eyes" – 6:26
5. "Silver (Original Beats)" – 6:57 †
6. "Wolves (Original Mix)" – 8:35 †

† indicates a track exclusive to the Japanese edition of the album.

== Personnel ==
- Justin Broadrick – guitar, vocals, programming
- Diarmuid Dalton – bass
- Ted Parsons – drums on "Silver"
