= Cable Regime =

British rock band

Cable Regime was a British industrial rock and noise band that existed between 1988 and 1997. Cable Regime released three albums, two EPs, a 12" single, and was included on various compilation albums. Its final album, Cable Regime, was released in 2000. Paul Neville was a member of the band Godflesh, and Diarmuid Dalton is an occasional member of the band Jesu.

== Discography ==
- "Assimilate & Destroy" (CD, Maxi) – 1992
- "Life in the House of the Enemy" (CD) – 1992
- "Dance Trilogy" (CD, Maxi) – 1993
- Kill Lies All (CD) – 1993
- "King of Beers" (12" single) – 1993
- Brave New World (CD, Maxi) – 1995
- Cable Regime (CD) – 2000
- Mortar (Various Artists) – Cable Regime – Cop Shoot Cop – Nox – Caspar Brötzmann – Massaker – Gore / Hoer – Fall of Because – Grill (digital publishing) – 2014

== Members ==
- Paul Neville – guitars and vocals
- Steve Hough – guitars
- Diarmuid Dalton – bass
