= Everyday I Get Closer to the Light from Which I Came =

Studio album by Jesu
- Released: 23 September 2013
- Recorded: Avalanche Studio, 2011–2013
- Genre: Post-metal, shoegazing
- Length: 42:39
- Label: Avalanche Recordings
- Producer: Justin Broadrick

Jesu chronology
Ascension (2011)	Everyday I Get Closer to the Light from Which I Came (2013)	Jesu/Sun Kil Moon (2016)

Professional ratings
Aggregate scores
Source	Rating
Metacritic	75/100
Review scores
Source	Rating
Allmusic	4/5 stars
Fact	3.5/5 stars
Exclaim!	5/10
Pitchfork	(6.8/10)
Popmatters	8/10

Everyday I Get Closer to the Light from Which I Came is the fourth studio album by the British post-metal band Jesu. It was released on 23 September 2013 via frontman Justin Broadrick's own record label, Avalanche Recordings.

The album attributes influences from post-punk, dub and electronica. Its sound relies on a more sombre, darker mood than the outlet's previous album Ascension, which featured a shorter, more guitar-led approach during its production. All instruments on the album, except for a string orchestra, were played by Broadrick himself.

== Critical reception ==
The album received generally positive reviews. At Metacritic, which assigns a normalized rating out of 100 to reviews from critics, the album received an average score of 75, which indicates "generally favorable reviews", based on 6 reviews. Thom Jurek of Allmusic gave the album a positive review, stating: "Over five tracks and nearly 45 minutes, Broadrick not only touches variously on every musical phase Jesu has visited previously, but stresses the power of lyricism via myriad textures and actual dynamics over sheer metallic force." Maya Kalev of Fact wrote: "Though it sounds like it couldn’t be by anybody else, it’s more sonically diverse and less dense than previous Jesu albums." Robert Rubsam of Popmatters described the album as "Broadrick's poppiest, most beautiful, and, arguably, most satisfying collection since 2006," while commenting: "as much as it feels like another step towards that light, the album reflects the work that came before it."

In a more mixed review, Eric Hill of Exclaim! stated: "There are great moments that fulfil expectations of Jesu as a dissolving whirlpool bath of glass shards, but these flashes don't carry the full weight of the album." Jason Heller of Pitchfork also wrote: "The tracks vary greatly in span, but beyond that there’s not as much of a dynamic as on prior Jesu full-lengths."

== Track listing ==
All songs written and composed by Justin Broadrick.

No.	Title	Length
1.	"Homesick"	5:58
2.	"Comforter"	7:10
3.	"Everyday I Get Closer to the Light from Which I Came"	7:32
4.	"The Great Leveller"	17:25
5.	"Grey Is the Colour"	4:34

Japanese edition only bonus disc
No.	Title	Length
1.	"Everyday I Get Closer to the Light from Which I Came" (Alternative version)	7:25
2.	"The Great Leveller" (Alternative version)	10:19

== Personnel ==
- Justin Broadrick - instruments, lyrics, production
- Nicola Manzan - string orchestra
- James Plotkin - mastering
