= Conqueror (Jesu album) =

Studio album by Jesu
- Released: 2 February 2007 (Japan); 19 February 2007 (UK); 20 February 2007 (US)
- Recorded: 2003–2006
- Genres: Post-metal, experimental rock, sludge metal, shoegazing
- Length: 57:56
- Labels: Hydra Head Records (HH666-126); Daymare (2xCD) (DYMC-017); Conspiracy (2x12" vinyl) (CORE046)
- Producer: Justin Broadrick

Jesu chronology
Silver (2006)	Conqueror (2007)	Sun Down / Sun Rise (2007)

Professional ratings
Review scores
Source	Rating
Absolutepunk.net	75/100
Allmusic	4/5 stars
Metal Hammer	7/10 stars
No Ripcord	8/10 stars
Pitchfork Media	7.8/10
PopMatters	8/10
Rocklouder	4/5 stars
Revolver	4.5/5 stars

Conqueror is the second album from Jesu. It was released on 20 February 2007 in the United States, 19 February in the United Kingdom and Europe, and on 2 February in Japan.

The Japanese edition contains a bonus disc featuring the two tracks that constitute the Sun Down / Sun Rise EP.

This album features much more melody and less drone than the self-titled album. "Stanlow" concerns itself with the oil refinery of the same name; the song opens with a treated fragment of a 1980 track by OMD, also titled "Stanlow".

In support of the album, the band made their United States live debut, in March 2007, as an opening act for Isis, although work permit problems caused them to miss the first three weeks of the tour.

== Track listing ==
All tracks are written by Justin Broadrick.

No.	Title	Length
1.	"Conqueror"	8:10
2.	"Old Year"	5:46
3.	"Transfigure"	5:58
4.	"Weightless & Horizontal"	10:06
5.	"Medicine"	7:22
6.	"Brighteyes"	7:20
7.	"Mother Earth"	7:16
8.	"Stanlow"	5:58
Total length:		57:56

== Personnel ==
- Justin Broadrick - guitars, vocals, programming
- Diarmuid Dalton - bass
- Ted Parsons - drums, percussion
