= Avalanche Recordings =

Record label

- Founded: 1999
- Founder: Justin Broadrick
- Status: Active
- Genre: Extreme metal, experimental, electronic, ambient
- Country of origin: United Kingdom
- Official website: avalancherecordings.bandcamp.com

Avalanche Recordings is an independent record label, founded by English musician Justin Broadrick in 1999. It is named after Broadrick's own recording studio, Avalanche Studios, and mainly releases Justin Broadrick's projects.

The first release of the label was Godflesh's previously unreleased EP, Messiah in 2000. This was followed by Zonal's The Quatermass Project Volume 1, released in the same year.

The label extensively released various Jesu recordings, including Pale Sketches in 2007, Infinity in 2009 and Everyday I Get Closer to the Light from Which I Came in 2013.

On 29 March 2013, Justin Broadrick announced via Twitter that the label's official website would be migrating to Bandcamp and operating under there.

== Artists ==
Justin Broadrick projects

- Jesu
- Final
- Godflesh
- Krackhead
- Council Estate Electronics
- Solaris BC
- White Static Demon
- Zonal

Other

- Amantra
- Halspirit
- Transitional

== Catalogue ==
- AREC001: Godflesh – Messiah (2000)
- AREC002: Zonal – The Quatermass Project Volume 1 (2000)
- AREC003: Final – Infinite Guitar (2007)
- AREC004: Final – Infinite Guitar 2 (2007)
- AREC005: Final – Guitar & Bass Improvisations Vol 1 (2007)
- AREC006: Final – Guitar & Bass Improvisations Vol 2 (2007)
- AREC007: Jesu – Heart Ache (2004)
- AREC008: Jesu – Pale Sketches (2007)
- AREC009: Jesu – Pale Sketches (2008, vinyl)
- AREC010: Final – Afar (2008)
- AREC011: Final – Infinite Guitar 1 & 2 / Guitar & Bass Improvisations Vol 1 & 2 (2008)
- AREC012: Final – Fade Away (2008)
- AREC013: Krackhead – From Hell (2009)
- AREC014: Council Estate Electronics – Kitsland (2009)
- AREC015: Solaris BC – Submerged Technology (2009)
- AREC016: White Static Demon - Decayed (2009)
- AREC017: Jesu – Infinity (2009)
- AREC018: Final – Infinite Guitar 3 / Guitar & Bass Improvisations 3 (2009)
- AREC019: Final – My Body Is a Dying Machine (2010)
- AREC020: Council Estate Electronics - Longmeadow (2012)
- AREC021: Jesu – Christmas (2010)
- ARECTF01: Final – The Apple Never Falls Far From the Tree (2010)
- AREC022: Final – Burning Bridges Will Light Your Way (2012)
- AREC023: Transitional – Dark Matter Communion (2013)
- AREC024: Jesu – Duchess/Veiled (2013)
- AREC025: Final – Infinite Guitar 4 (2013)
- AREC026: White Static Demon – The Poisoned Tape (2013)
- AREC027: Jesu – Everyday I Get Closer to the Light from Which I Came (2013)
- AREC028: Godflesh – Streetcleaner: Live at Roadburn 2011 vinyl release (2013)
- AREC029: Halspirit – Musiques immobiles (2014)
- AREC033: Amantra – Rituals (2014)
- AREC034: Godflesh – A World Lit Only by Fire (2014)
- AREC040: Godflesh – Post Self (2017) / Streetcleaner: Live at Roadburn 2011 CD release (2017)
- AREC041: Celer – Plays Godflesh (2019)
- AREC066: Godflesh – Purge (2023)
