= Heart Ache =

EP by Jesu
- Released: 30 August 2004
- Genre: Drone metal; post-metal
- Length: 39:56
- Label: Dry Run (CD) (dry98cd); Avalanche (12" vinyl) (AREC007); Hydra Head (2XCD); Daymare (DYMC-131) (2XCD)
- Producer: Justin Broadrick

Jesu chronology
Heart Ache (2004)	Jesu (2004)

Professional ratings
Review scores
Source	Rating
Kerrang!	5/5 stars

The Heart Ache EP is the first release by Jesu. Justin Broadrick wrote both tracks, played all of the instruments as well as mixed and produced the EP. It was originally released on 30 August 2004 by Dry Run Records; Avalanche Recordings released a 12" vinyl version in January 2008 also. The vinyl version is limited to 1500 copies.

Hydra Head was scheduled to re-release the CD edition in September 2009 but it was later rescheduled to be released on 16 November 2010. This new edition, titled Heart Ache/Dethroned, includes a second disc featuring a previously unreleased 2003 EP titled Dethroned. Daymare Records released the compilation in Japan on 24 November 2010 and included one bonus track not available on the Hydra Head version of the Dethroned EP.

== Track listing ==
1. "Heart Ache" – 19:42
2. "Ruined" – 20:13

== Personnel ==
- Justin Broadrick – guitar, bass, vocals, programming
