= Pale Sketches =

Compilation album by Jesu
- Released: 9 October 2007 (Worldwide); 19 August 2009 (Japan)
- Recorded: 2000–2007
- Genre: Electronica, ambient, shoegazing, post-metal, experimental rock
- Length: 46:36
- Label: Avalanche (AREC009); Daymare (DYMC97)
- Producer: Justin Broadrick

Jesu chronology
Jesu / Eluvium (2007)	Pale Sketches (2007)	Lifeline (EP) (2007)

Professional ratings
Review scores
Source	Rating
A Distorted Reality	4.5/5 stars

Pale Sketches is a full length compilation of previously unreleased studio material recorded by Jesu between 2000 and 2007. It was released worldwide on October 9, 2007 through Justin Broadrick's own Avalanche Recordings label and limited to 2,000 copies on CD, and 1,000 on gatefold vinyl LP.

On August 19, 2009, Daymare Recordings re-issued Pale Sketches as a two-disc CD set. The second disc features three exclusive, previously unreleased, remixes.

On August 24, 2010, Justin Broadrick released Jesu: Pale Sketches Demixed on Ghostly International under the name "Pale Sketcher". The album was a release of "demixed" remixes of the album and was preceded by the lead single of "Can I Go Now (Gone Version)".

== Track listing ==
1. "Don't Dream It" - 5:30
2. "Can I Go Now?" - 5:49
3. "Wash It All Away" - 5:22
4. "The Playgrounds Are Empty" - 5:37
5. "Dummy" - 6:46
6. "Supple Hope" - 6:39
7. "Tiny Universe" - 4:59
8. "Plans That Fade" - 5:44
9. "Don't Dream It (2009 Instrumental Version)" †
10. "Supple Hope (2009 Mix)" †
11. "The Playgrounds Are Empty (Slumber Mix)" †

† indicates a track exclusive to the Japanese re-release edition of the album.

== Personnel ==
- Justin Broadrick - guitars, vocals, programming
