= Sun Down/Sun Rise =

EP by Jesu
- Released: 2 February 2007 (Japan); 23 April 2007 (Worldwide)
- Genre: Post-metal, experimental rock, ambient, shoegazing, electronica
- Length: 32:42
- Label: Aurora Borealis, Daymare
- Producer: Justin Broadrick

Jesu chronology
Conqueror (2007)	Sun Down/Sun Rise (2007)	Jesu/Eluvium (2007)

Sun Down/Sun Rise is the fifth release by Jesu.

The EP was released on 12" colored vinyl in two limited formats through Aurora Borealis Records on 23 April 2007. The EP had seen a prior release as a bonus CD appended to the Japanese version of Conqueror issued via Daymare. It has subsequently seen a second pressing via Aurora Borealis and Hydra Head in different colors. The photo on the cover of the album is by Seldon Hunt.

According to Broadrick's blog, it was originally intended for an end of 2006 release, prior to the release of Conqueror (which was projected for early 2007 in the same entry).

== Track listing ==
1. "Sun Down" - 17:30
2. "Sun Rise" - 15:12

== Personnel ==
- Justin Broadrick – guitars/vocals/programming
- Diarmuid Dalton – bass
