= Jesu (album) =

Studio album by Jesu
- Released: 8 December 2004
- Recorded: 2001–2004
- Genre: Drone metal; post-metal; industrial metal; shoegaze
- Length: 74:25
- Label: Hydra Head (HH666-79)
- Producer: Justin Broadrick

Jesu chronology
Heart Ache (EP) (2004)	Jesu (2004)	Silver (EP) (2006)

Professional ratings
Review scores
Source	Rating
AllMusic	3.5/5 stars
Pitchfork	7.9/10
PopMatters	7/10
Stylus Magazine	B
Tiny Mix Tapes	4/5

Jesu is the first album by British experimental music band Jesu, released through Hydra Head Records on 8 December 2004. Unlike the Heart Ache EP, where Justin Broadrick executed all instrumentation himself, this release features Ted Parsons on drums, Diarmuid Dalton on bass, and a guest appearance by Paul Neville on guitar on the track "Man/Woman". The album was released in Japan by Daymare Recordings and contains two additional instrumental remixes on a bonus disc. In February 2005, a double vinyl picture disc set was released by Hydra Head, limited to 1000 copies.

In 2022, Broadrick described "Tired of Me" as "one of my most favorite songs I ever wrote" as it documented an extremely painful period in his life following the dissolution of Godflesh (the musical group he had led since the 1980s) and the break-up of a long-time romantic relationship.

== Track listing ==
All tracks are written by Justin K. Broadrick.

No.	Title	Length
1.	"Your Path to Divinity"	9:14
2.	"Friends Are Evil"	9:43
3.	"Tired of Me"	9:30
4.	"We All Faulter"	6:56
5.	"Walk on Water"	11:23
6.	"Sun Day"	10:02
7.	"Man/Woman"	9:28
8.	"Guardian Angel"	8:06
Total length:		74:25

Japanese edition only bonus disc
No.	Title	Length
1.	"Your Path to Divinity (The Endless Path)"	9:22
2.	"Friends Are Evil (Highest Throne)"	11:31
Total length:		20:53

== Personnel ==
Jesu

- Justin Broadrick – guitar, vocals, bass, programming
- Ted Parsons – drums, percussion
- Diarmuid Dalton – bass ("Your Path to Divinity", "Tired of Me", "We All Faulter", "Guardian Angel")
- Paul Neville – guitar ("Man/Woman")

Technical personnel

- Justin K. Broadrick – production, photography
- Lars Klokkerhaug, Lars Sorensen – engineering
- Aaron Turner – design, layout

== Release history ==
Country	Date	Label	Format	Catalogue #	Notes
United States	8 December 2004	Hydra Head Records	CD	HH666-79	
United States	February 2005	Hydra Head Records	2LP	HH666-79	Double picture disc edition; limited to 1000 copies
Belgium	December 2004	Conspiracy Records	2LP	core 026	Pressed on three colour variations: blue (limited to 50), red (limited to 150), and black (limited to 800)
Japan	29 October 2004	Daymare Recordings	2CD	PTCD-1015-6	Comes in a jewel case
Japan	5 October 2007	Daymare Recordings	2CD	DYMC-045	Reissue comes in a mini-LP sleeve
