= Head of David =

British heavy metal band

- Origin: United Kingdom
- Genres: Experimental metal industrial metal
- Years active: 1986–1991
- Label: Blast First
- Past members: Stephen R. Burroughs; Eric Jurenovskis; Dave Cochrane; Paul Sharp; Justin Broadrick; Bipin Kumar

Head of David were a British heavy metal band that featured vocalist Stephen R. Burroughs and ex-Napalm Death member Justin Broadrick (later of Godflesh and Jesu). The band's sound paved way for various music genres, including industrial metal, grindcore and noise rock. The band were influenced by Suicide and covered the song "Rocket USA" on their first EP.

Andrea 'Enthal described them in Spin magazine as such: "they re-create the feeling that music cannot get any more abrasive without descending into pure noise".

== Band members ==
- Stephen R. Burroughs – vocals
- Eric Jurenovskis – guitars
- Bipin Kumar – bass/backing vocals
- Dave Cochrane – bass (1986–1989)
- Paul Sharp – drums (1986–1987)
- Justin Broadrick – drums (1987–1989)

== Discography ==
Released	Title	Label	UK Indie Chart position	Additional information
Sep 1986	Dogbreath EP			
Oct 1986	LP	Blast First	3	Side A "Dogbreath" / Side B "Godbreath"
July 1987	The Shit Hits the Fan		21	live at the I.C.A., London
March 1988	Dustbowl	Blast First		album; Side A "Rays" / Side B "Shadows"
February 1989	The Saveana Mixes	Blast First		EP recorded 1987
February 1989	White Elephant	Blast First		John Peel sessions 23 September 1986 & 7 July 1987
January 1991	Seed State	Blast First; Elektra		album
March 1991	Soul Spark EP	Blast First		10"
