= Jesu (band) =

British experimental metal band

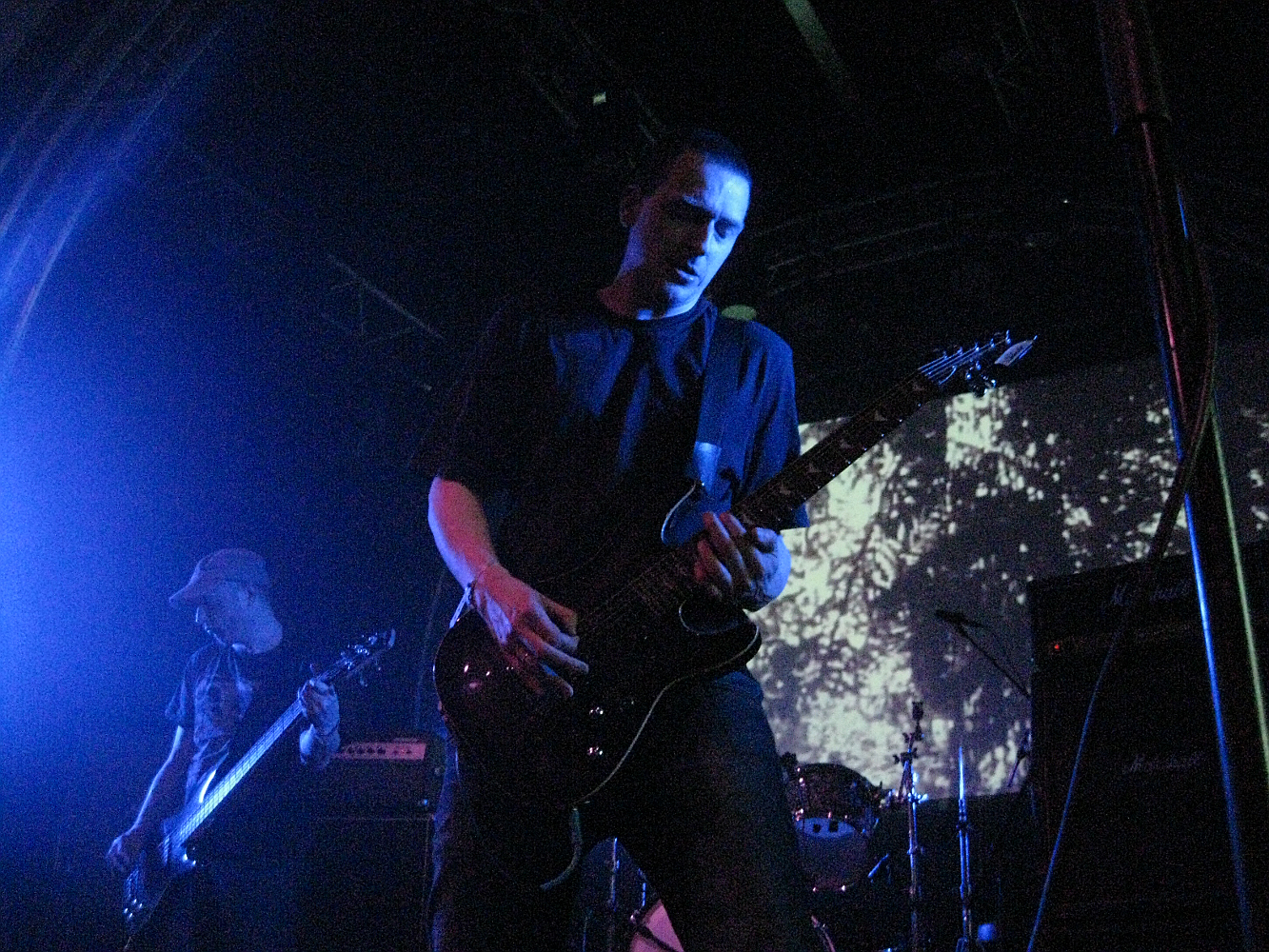
- Jesu performing in 2012

Background information
- Origin: Abergele, Wales
- Genres: Shoegaze; post-metal; drone metal; industrial metal
- Years active: 2003–present
- Labels: Hydra Head, Daymare Recordings, Avalanche, Aurora Borealis, Temporary Residence Limited, Dry Run, Caldo Verde
- Members: Justin Broadrick
- Past members: Diarmuid Dalton; Ted Parsons

Jesu (pronounced "yay-zoo") are a British experimental metal band formed in 2003 by Justin Broadrick following the breakup of his band Godflesh. It shares its name with the last song on Hymns, the final album of Godflesh's initial run. Jesu's sound is heavily layered and textured, incorporating a diverse mix of influences. Broadrick himself has stated that "...it's very loosely speaking pop/rock/metal/electronica ... I'm intentionally writing what I consider to be coherent 'pop' songs".

== History ==
=== 2004–2008 ===
Jesu's first release, the Heart Ache EP, was released in 2004 and featured Broadrick performing all of the instruments and vocals alone. It was followed four months later by the full-length Jesu LP, which featured contributions from bassist Diarmuid Dalton and drummer Ted Parsons on select tracks. A tour of Europe, in support of the album, featured Roderic Mounir of Knut filling in for Parsons. Commenting on the sonic influences of the band, Broadrick said: "I really wanted to take that rhythm and weld it to the Godflesh sensibilities of abstract, surreal, mutated metal."

With their third release, 2006's four song Silver EP, Jesu took a more melodic and layered approach, gaining comparison to shoegazing band My Bloody Valentine. The majority of this release features Broadrick and Dalton, with Parsons joining them for the title track.

The full lineup recorded the second full-length album, Conqueror, which was released in February 2007. Broadrick and Dalton recorded the Sun Down/Sun Rise EP without Parsons for a 23 April release. This EP had already seen release in Japan where it had been packaged as a bonus CD for the Conqueror album. Jesu returned as a solo act with the release of a split 12" album with Eluvium, released on 5 July 2007.

October 2007 saw the release of Pale Sketches, a collection of previously unreleased Jesu songs, performed entirely by Broadrick and recorded between 2000 and 2007. The album was released on Broadrick's own label, Avalanche. That same month, a four-song EP titled Lifeline, once again featuring Broadrick as the sole member, was released by Hydra Head in the United States and Daymare in Japan. The band made their United States live debut in March 2007 as an opening act for Isis, although work permit problems caused them to miss the first three weeks of the tour. Neither Parsons nor Dalton were able to participate in the tour and were temporarily replaced by Danny Walker (of Intronaut) and long-time Broadrick collaborator Dave Cochrane (Head of David, God, Ice), respectively. During this tour, Jesu also made their South by Southwest debut as part of a Hydra Head Records showcase.

In late 2007 the band embarked on headlining tours of the United Kingdom, Japan, Europe and the United States. During this tour, Phil Petrocelli of Seattle band, Black Noise Cannon, took over as the band's touring drummer. Jesu released their second split release, this time with Japanese post-rock band, Envy, exclusively in Japan through Daymare Records on 11 July 2008. On 12 August 2008, a third split 12", this time with Battle of Mice, was engineered by Joel Hamilton and released by Robotic Empire. The album had originally been announced in 2006 but was delayed while awaiting cover art.

On 9 September 2008 Hydra Head released Why Are We Not Perfect, a CDEP featuring the three Jesu songs previously only available on the Eluvium split vinyl album, as well as two new remixes. Daymare released the album, in Japan, with an additional third remix not available on the American release. On 23 September 2008 Dwell Records released Like Black Holes in The Sky: The Tribute to Syd Barrett which features Jesu covering Pink Floyd's "Chapter 24." Jesu also contributed a cover version of The Cure's "The Funeral Party" to Manimal Vinyl's Perfect As Cats: A Tribute to The Cure. The album was released digitally through iTunes on 28 October 2008. The CD edition of the album was released in stores on 25 November 2008, in a limited edition of 2,000 copies.

In March 2009 Broadrick announced a new one-song LP, titled Infinity, scheduled for release through his own Avalanche Recordings label in June 2009, although he later announced it was certain to be released in July. Infinity was made available to purchase through Broadrick's Avalanche Recording webstore on 23 July. On 29 July Broadrick made the album available via digital download. The album consists of one track, lasting approximately 50 minutes, performed entirely by Broadrick. On 19 August 2009 Daymare released the Infinity album as a two-disc set featuring an extra track as well as a re-release of Pale Sketches, containing a second disc featuring three new remixes.

=== 2009–present ===
Broadrick also announced that a new EP, titled Opiate Sun, would be released in July 2009. The EP had originally been mentioned in 2008 but a title and official release date had yet to be announced. Opiate Sun was later rescheduled for 27 October 2009, and was released on Mark Kozelek's record label Caldo Verde. The Daymare edition of the album was released on 6 November 2009 in Japan and includes a "demo" version of one of the four songs as a bonus track. Initially, the EP was intended to be the first studio recording to include the lineup of Justin Broadrick, Dave Cochrane and Phil Petrocelli. This lineup was to be featured on two of the four tracks, with the classic lineup of Broadrick, Parsons and Dalton performing the other two tracks. The released version of the album features Broadick performing solo on all four tracks.

In June 2009, Hydra Head re-released the Jesu/Envy split 12" on CD. The label also released a double 10" vinyl edition in September 2009. On 16 November 2010 Hydra Head released Heart Ache/Dethroned, which featured a reissue of the Heart Ache EP, packaged with Dethroned, a previously unreleased Jesu EP from 2003.

In March 2010, Broadrick stated that he felt that Jesu had strayed further away from the guitar driven music that he intended it to be and more into electronica. Broadrick further stated that while Jesu would continue to contain electronic elements, it would return to a guitar driven sound and a new project, named Pale Sketcher, would allow Broadrick to continue exploring the electronica oriented sound without interfering with Jesu. Jesu released two albums after 2010, Ascension (2011), Everyday I Get Closer to the Light from Which I Came (2013).

In January 2016, Broadrick, as Jesu, collaborated with Mark Kozelek's folk rock project, Sun Kil Moon to record an album titled Jesu/Sun Kil Moon and the collaborative act toured in support of the album. Jesu and Sun Kil Moon collaborated once again to record a cover of "Condor Ave" for an Elliott Smith tribute album titled Say Yes!, released in October 2016. A second album by Jesu and Sun Kil Moon, titled 30 Seconds to the Decline of Planet Earth, was released in May 2017.

On July 3, 2020, Jesu released the five-track Never EP digitally through Bandcamp. A new full-length, titled Terminus, was released through the same outlet on November 13, 2020.

Broadrick works from a studio in Abergele, Wales.

== Remixes ==
Using the Jesu name, Broadrick has also contributed remixed versions of songs by such bands as Mogwai, N.I.C., Agoraphobic Nosebleed, Explosions in the Sky, Interpol, Isis, Pelican, Earth, Cult of Luna, Fog, Maninkari, Pyramids, Yakuza, Genghis Tron, Jack Colwell, Challenger, Constants, Isaurian and Oathbreaker.

== Members ==
Current members

- Justin Broadrick – guitar, vocals, programming, bass, drums

Former members

- Diarmuid Dalton – bass (2004–2007)
- Ted Parsons – drums, percussion (2004–2007)

Touring musicians

- Danny Walker – drums
- Dave Cochrane – bass
- Phil Petrocelli – drums
- Roderic Mounir – drums

Session musicians

- Paul Neville – additional guitar ("Man/Woman" from Jesu)
- Jarboe – vocals ("Storm Comin' On" from Lifeline)

== Discography ==
- Jesu (2004)
- Conqueror (2007)
- Ascension (2011)
- Everyday I Get Closer to the Light from Which I Came (2013)
- Terminus (2020)
