= Justin Broadrick =

English musician, singer and songwriter

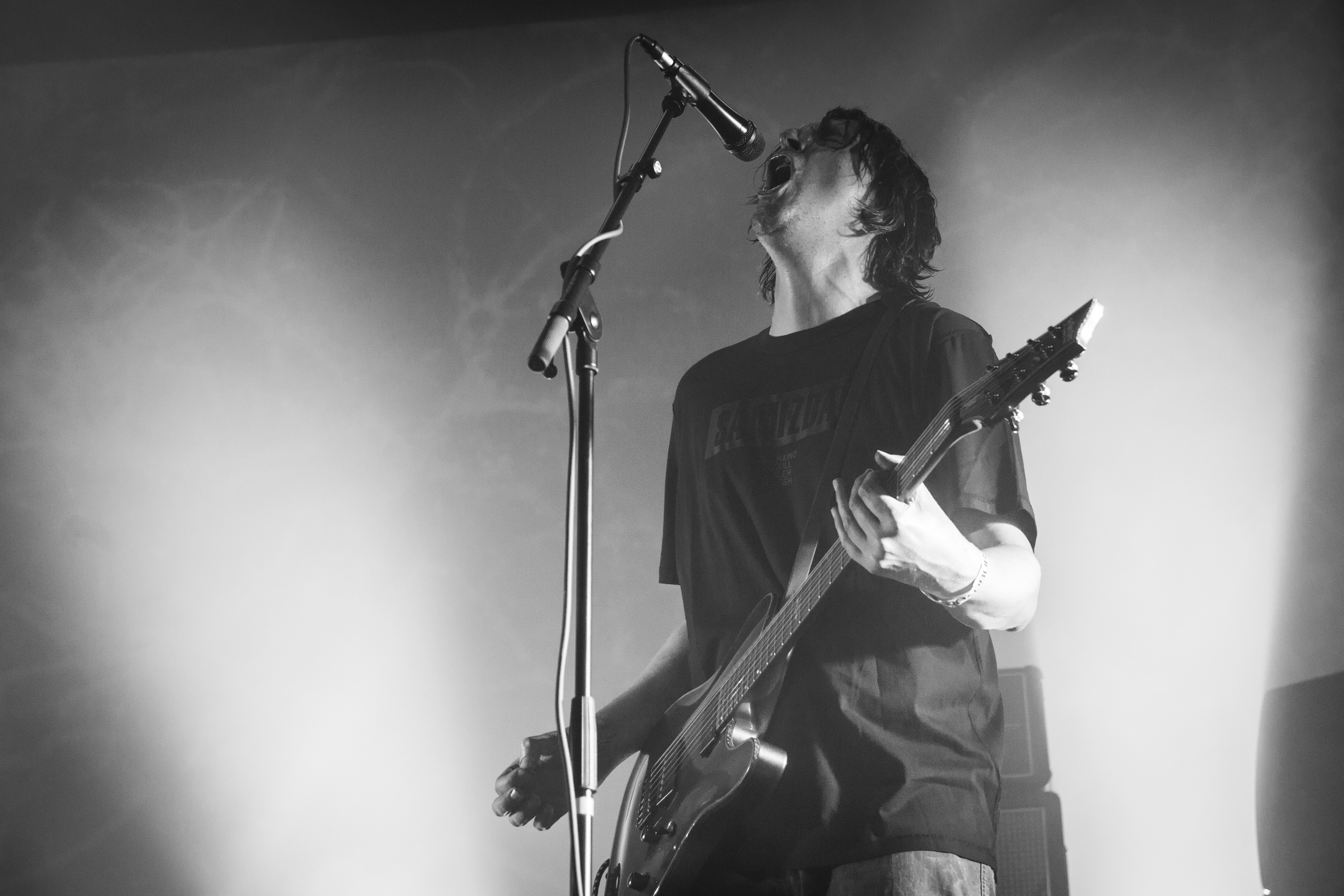
- Broadrick performing with Godflesh at Roadburn Festival 2018

Background information
- Also known as: Justin K. Broadrick; JKB; JK Flesh
- Born: Justin Karl Michael Broadrick; 15 August 1969 (age 57); Birmingham, England
- Genres: Industrial metal; grindcore; experimental
- Occupations: Singer; songwriter; musician; record producer
- Instruments: Vocals; guitar; drums; synthesiser; sampler
- Years active: 1982–present
- Labels: Avalanche Recordings; Hydra Head; Ghostly International; Relapse; Give/Take
- Member of: Godflesh, Jesu, Zonal, Final, Greymachine
- Formerly of: Fall of Because, GOD, Napalm Death, Techno Animal, Head of David

Justin Karl Michael Broadrick (born 15 August 1969) is an English musician, singer and songwriter. He is best known as the lead singer, guitarist, and a founding member of the band Godflesh, one of the first bands to combine elements of extreme metal and industrial music. Following Godflesh's initial breakup in 2002, Broadrick formed the band Jesu.

He was briefly in the English grindcore band Napalm Death when he was a teenager in the mid-1980s, writing and recording guitar for their debut album, Scum. Broadrick has also maintained a parallel career as a producer, producing records and remixes for groups such as Pantera, Isis, Mogwai and Hydra Head labelmates Pelican. Since the 1990s he has worked with Kevin Martin as Techno Animal an electronic music project based in a fusion of industrial, dub, ambient and hip hop, which disbanded in 2001 and was reactivated in 2017 under the new name Zonal. Since 2012, he has been releasing hard techno music under the solo moniker JK Flesh. Broadrick has set up record labels such as HeadDirt, Avalanche Recordings, Post Mortem Productions (briefly renamed Uprising Productions), Lo Fibre and Heartache.

== Biography ==
=== Childhood and first recordings (1969–1983) ===
Broadrick was born on 15 August 1969, in a council estate of inner Birmingham. For the first four years of his life, Broadrick was raised by his mother Gabrielle Fern (a.k.a. Lucy Nation) and stepfather Robert Fern (a.k.a. Bob Allcock) in a hippie commune in Shard End. In the late '70s, Broadrick's mother and stepfather were members of Anti-Social, a band infamous for live shows involving blood and faecal matter, as well as for soliciting people to commit suicide via guillotine live on stage. Anti-Social were dubbed "the world's most violent rock group" and released one single, Traffic Lights/Teacher Teacher which is now one of the rarest UK punk record releases. During a period of heroin addiction, Broadrick's biological father was mostly absent from the family home. According to Broadrick, his maternal grandmother from Germany was a practicing white witch with an interest in the occult.

By the age of ten, Broadrick was surrounded by the punk-rock that his parents listened to. "There was Led Zeppelin and Black Sabbath, but it was always the stuff that wasn't so standard that grabbed me. I was always playing things like Lou Reed's Metal Machine Music when I was about eight! Stuff like Can, the weirdest parts of Pink Floyd, Hendrix", says Broadrick. "The first thing I probably heard out of the house, when I was about 11 years old, was Crass", says Broadrick. Shortly after seeing them at his first concert, he recorded his first demo tape at the age of 11. "By the age of 12 I fell into early industrial music, stuff like Throbbing Gristle, Whitehouse". Broadrick began to play with his stepfather's guitar, who was then into Roxy Music and Brian Eno.

In 1982, he started publishing tapes with his friend Andy Swan, who had a synthesizer. The first name they went under was Atrocity Exhibition, named after a Joy Division track (which, itself, takes its name from a book by J. G. Ballard). Their first recording was titled Live in the Studio and was the first catalogued release on their cassette label Post Mortem Rekordings. Shortly after, the project was named Smear Campaign, after a Nocturnal Emissions track. This was the name they went under at their first live performance on 7 July 1984 in The Mermaid in Birmingham. Promptly after the show they settled on the name Final. Final was then inspired lyrically and musically by acts such as Throbbing Gristle and Maurizio Bianchi. "We were pretty heavily into the whole industrial tape culture and fanzines of the very early '80s", Broadrick says. The project developed to embrace the power electronics subgenre of industrial music in 1983, releasing material by them and other industrial projects on Post Mortem Rekordings (which was renamed Uprising Productions in 1985) such as Family Patrol Group, Mental Health Act, Ashenden, The Grey Wolves, Con-Dom, Death Magazine 52, Fern and Un-Kommuniti. Final went under numerous lineup changes during its lifetime, including musicians like Philip Timms, Daniel Johnson, Paul Neville, Nicholas Bullen, Graham Robertson and Guy Pearce. "I had about 50 Final releases over about a year and a half", he says. Other project names Broadrick recorded under included Last Exit, Crusade and Dead Pulp. Broadrick also had a short-lived progressive punk band called The Blakk Korridor with Diarmuid Dalton and Dan.

=== Fall of Because and Napalm Death (1984–1986) ===
In 1984, Broadrick joined the group Fall of Because [founded by G. Christian Green and Paul Neville in 1982 initially named O.P.D. (Officially Pronounced Dead)] as a drummer and additional vocalist. The group recorded the Extirpate demo cassette in 1986, which contained a number of songs which were later re-worked as songs for Godflesh (including "Life Is Easy", "Mighty Trust Krusher" and "Merciless"). The group disbanded in 1988. The Life Is Easy compilation album of demo and live recordings was released in 1999.

Broadrick met Nicholas Bullen in 1985 at the flea market where he met Andy. Broadrick gave Final tapes to Bullen and they recorded some material together. "Then I played him some of the stuff I did with guitar, which he then played to another guy in Napalm Death. Basically, they were impressed with what I was doing with guitar, and so I joined Napalm Death", Broadrick says. Soon Mick Harris (then member of a psychobilly band) joined the lineup and they shifted from anarcho-punk to grindcore. "Nick and I left Napalm Death after we recorded the first side of Scum. I'd had enough of Napalm Death very, very quickly", he says. Lee Dorrian and Jim Whitely joined to replace Bullen and Broadrick. Broadrick gave the first side to Earache Records founder Digby Pearson, who then contacted the new Napalm Death that had recorded the second side.

=== Head of David and the forming of Godflesh (1987–1990) ===
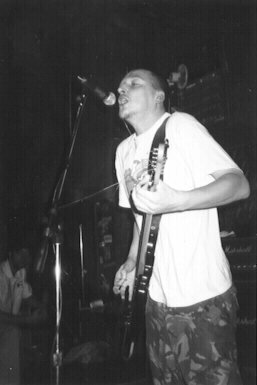
Broadrick performing with Godflesh at Wetlands Preserve in New York City on 11 November 1996

The industrial metal band Head of David had played live with Napalm Death before their drummer left and Broadrick was invited to take his place. "I was in Head of David literally six weeks, and we did a John Peel Session for Radio One. That was the first highlight of my life", Broadrick says. He had been writing more brutal songs for the band, but due to artistic differences, he was kicked out in 1988. "When I first got exposed in '89 to the early acid house movement, I was an instant convert. The first time I heard early Aphex Twin, when Digeridoo first came out, I knew that this was where I wanted to go", Broadrick says.

He formed Godflesh with his friend B. C. Green. They started with working on existing Fall of Because songs and Broadrick was influenced by the hip-hop sound at the time – artists like Public Enemy, Beastie Boys, Run-DMC. Godflesh released their debut self-titled EP on Swordfish Records and in 1989 Earache Records put out their first album Streetcleaner.

Broadrick met Kevin Martin of the band GOD. Martin had a club in Brixton and he promoted the first Godflesh show in London. Godflesh was met with derision on their first tour. However, Godflesh was well received in the United States. "To this day, I still sell the majority of my records in America. Of any music I make, it mostly goes to America", Broadrick says.

Broadrick also played guitar for Sweet Tooth with Scott Kiehl (of GOD) and Dave Cochrane (of Head of David), who released the album Soft White Underbelly on Earache Records in 1990. He is credited as co-writer for all songs. The band also contributed "Fat City" to the compilation Grindcrusher – The Ultimate Earache, which was also on Earache Records.

=== Side projects (1991–1993) ===
In 1991, Broadrick and Martin recorded their debut album Ghosts as Techno Animal and it was released on Martin's label Pathological Records. In the end of 1991 Godflesh recorded the experimental Slavestate EP. In 1992, Godflesh released their second studio album Pure. Broadrick and Martin created a new project called Ice in 1993, where they experimented with industrial and dub music as well as hip-hop beat patterns. Broadrick also revived his Final project along with his ambient guitar experiments in 1993. During this period, Broadrick produced records for Pram, Terminal Power Company, Lull and Cable Regime.

=== Kevin Martin collaborations and electronic music (1994–1999) ===
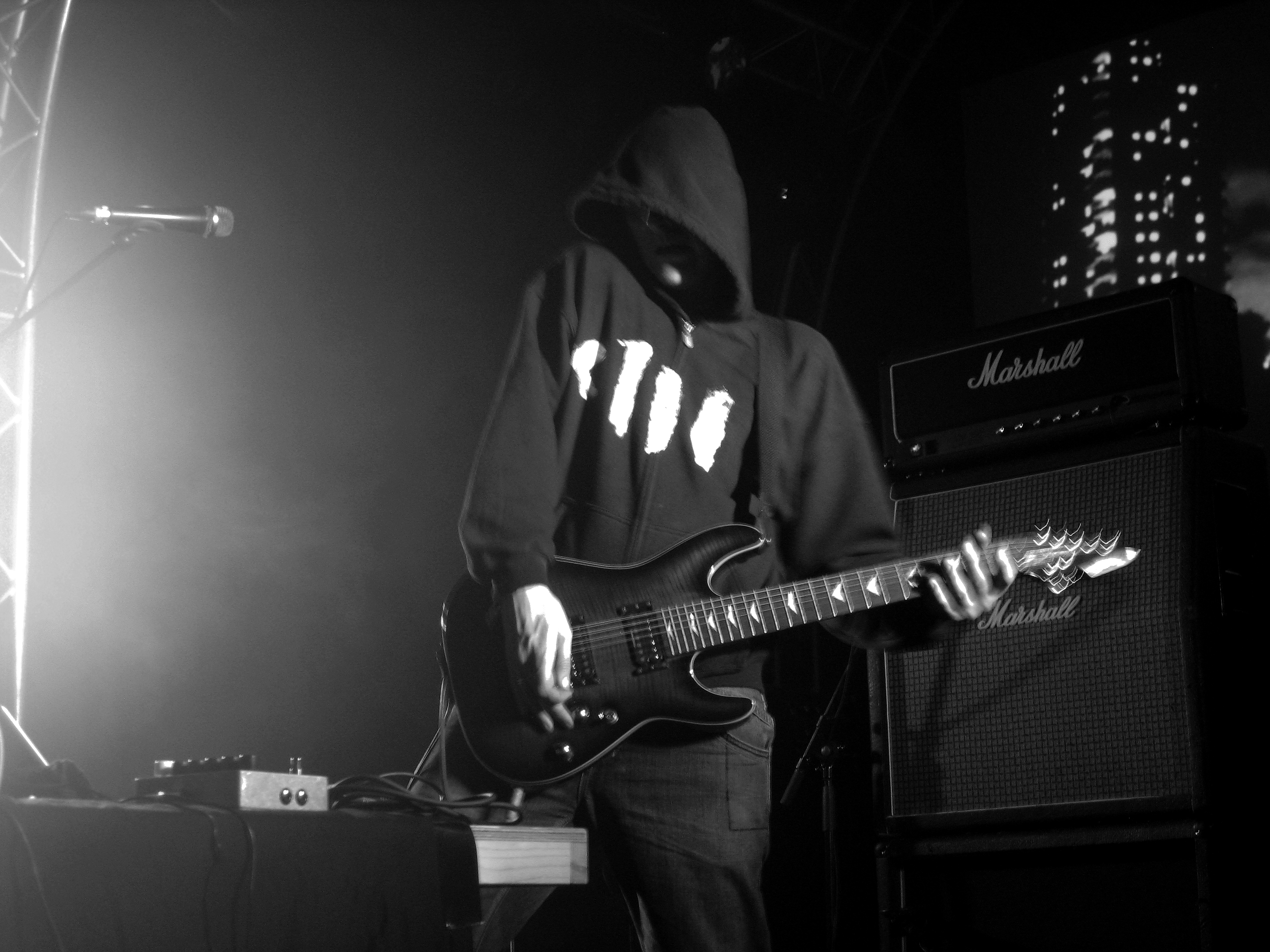
The debut live performance of JK Flesh at Roadburn Festival in Tilburg, Netherlands on 12 April 2012

In 1994, Godflesh released their album Selfless on Columbia Records and sold approximately 180,000 copies. Broadrick joined Kevin Martin's band GOD as a guitarist for their second and final album The Anatomy of Addiction. The duo recorded the second Techno Animal album, Re-Entry, which was released as a two-disc CD through Virgin Records in 1995. Broadrick was more influenced by hip-hop and dub music when Godflesh recorded the fourth album, Songs of Love and Hate, with live drummer Bryan Mantia. Broadrick also recorded the second Final full-length that was released on Rawkus Records. In 1997, Godflesh released the electronic remix record Love and Hate in Dub. "What Kevin and I were doing with Techno Animal then began to rub off on Godflesh, and vice versa", Broadrick says. From 1997 to 1999, Martin and Broadrick released two Techno Animal compilations, Versus Reality and Radio Hades, a split album with Porter Ricks. They also start a new project titled Curse of the Golden Vampire with Alec Empire. Broadrick also had recorded tracks as JK Flesh during this time but they were released in 2009 in the compilation album From Hell. He turned down offers to join both Faith No More and Danzig. Broadrick released drum and bass music under numerous pseudonyms such as Cylon, Tech Level 2 and Youpho. He also recorded such music with Kevin Martin under the names White Viper and Eraser. At that time, they were influenced by acts like Ed Rush and Dillinja, and labels like No U-Turn and Renegade Hardware.

=== End of Godflesh and Techno Animal (2000–2003) ===
In 2000, Broadrick, Green and drummer Ted Parsons began work on the Godflesh album, Hymns. "I was already aware of Godflesh's mortality. Though I enjoyed a good amount of the album, I still felt a bit restricted. I started doing a lot of stuff during the recording of that album where I was really trying to get past the limitations of Godflesh, which were self-created". After the album was released, G. C. Green left due to not wanting to tour any longer. Godflesh was booked for a European tour to open for Fear Factory, so Broadrick invited Paul Raven to replace Ben. A week into the tour Broadrick said "Raven is a fantastic bass player, but it just wasn't Benny, who I had been playing with for 13 years and was a whole part of what Godflesh was". A North American tour was also planned without Broadrick's input. Soon after, Broadrick and his girlfriend of thirteen years broke up. Broadrick slipped into a mental breakdown, fled back to Birmingham and hid at a friend's house just as he was supposed to board a plane to begin the North American tour. Bands, equipment companies and promoters moved to recoup the lost money and Broadrick lost his house and other valuable assets in his name. Kevin Martin moved on to record alone as The Bug and Techno Animal was ended.

=== Jesu and Final (2004–2009) ===
In August 2004, Broadrick's new project, Jesu, released the Heart Ache EP. In December, the self-titled debut LP was released. This release featured Ted Parsons on drums, Diarmuid Dalton on bass and a guest appearance from Paul Neville. The album was more melodic than his previous work. "I was still making low-tuned, heavy, guttural music, at the heart of this there was something quite pretty and beautiful, just being construed in an almost ugly fashion", said Broadrick. In November 2005 Broadrick played live as Final for the first time in 20 years and supported Jarboe. Final's two-disc release 3 had been in making for nearly five years and was put out in 2006. Broadrick toured Europe as Final in March 2006. In April 2006 the Silver EP was released through Hydra Head Records. The second full-length album, Conqueror, was released in February 2007. Jesu toured with Sunn O))) and Isis and Broadrick played as a guest with both bands. On 30 April 2007 Jesu released a 12" called Sun Down/Sun Rise. Broadrick began to release limited runs of material on his Avalanche Recordings label, including new material by Final and a Jesu full-length compilation of electronic tracks titled Pale Sketches. In 2008, Broadrick collaborated with former Swans vocalist Jarboe for an album titled J². In May 2008, Broadrick released the first download-only final full-length, Fade Away, and the second, Afar, in October. In 2009, Broadrick released the album Disconnected with his new band, Greymachine.

In January 2009, he released two new digital releases via his label Avalanche Recordings: the Krackhead album and Kitsland. Kitsland was a recording as Council Estate Recordings with Diarmuid Dalton. The project was influenced by Broadrick's old 1980s cassette material. In November 2009, Broadrick announced that Godflesh were reforming for a few shows in the summer 2010.

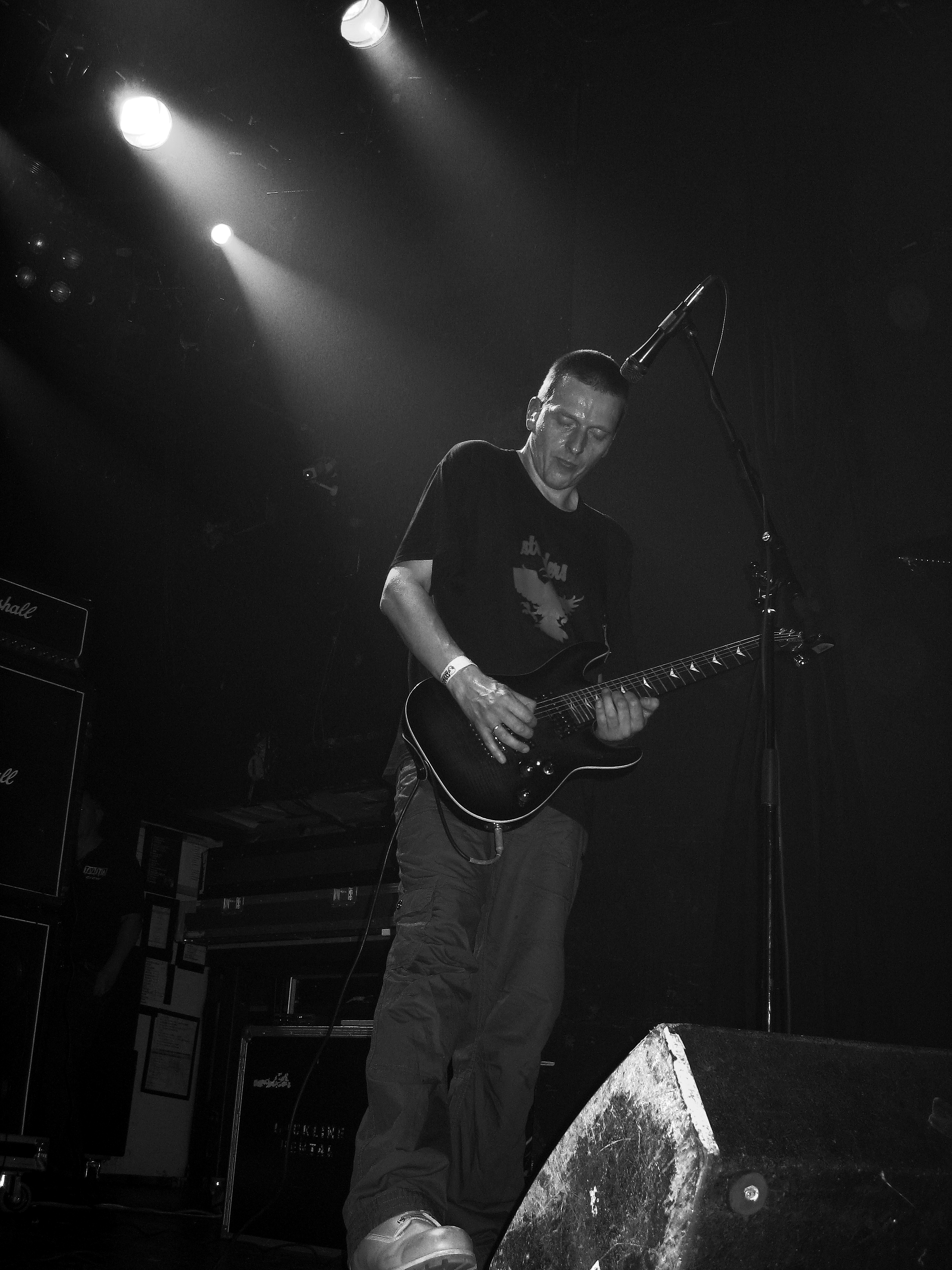
Godflesh performing at Tavastia Club in Helsinki, Finland on 24 September 2011

=== Pale Sketcher and solo album (2010–2013) ===
In March 2010, Broadrick announced that he felt Jesu had strayed further away from the guitar driven music that he intended it to be and more into electronica. As a resolution, although Jesu would still contain electronic elements, it would return to a guitar driven sound and a new project, titled Pale Sketcher, would allow Broadrick to explore the electronica oriented sound further without interfering with Jesu. "It's more 4/4-based – shoegazy dream-pop that's almost techno, somewhat in the area of Gas and some of the early Kompakt stuff like Dettinger". On 24 August 2010, he released Jesu: Pale Sketches Demixed on Ghostly International. Broadrick contributed guitar soundscapes to Alan Moore's audiobook Unearthing.

Broadrick released the album Posthuman under the JK Flesh project name on 30 April 2012. Although many of Broadrick's projects feature him performing all instrumentation anyway, the album is considered to be Broadrick's first solo album.

In April 2012, Valley of Fear, a new project of Broadrick, Matthew Bower and Samantha Davies, released an album of noise rock and black metal experiments on Legion Blotan Records. On 11 December, a split release between JK Flesh and Prurient called Worship Is the Cleansing of the Imagination was released on Hydra Head Records. On 17 June 2013, he released the free digital single Warm Sunday / Mogadon as Pale Sketcher on his new record label Heartache Records.

In August 2022, Broadrick announced the release of never before heard Pale Sketcher material. Golden Skin, written and recorded primarily between 2009 and 2013 was originally slated for release on Richard D. James' (Aphex Twin) Rephlex Records prior to it shuttering. The album was unearthed and completed by Broadrick specifically for its unveiling on Give/Take on September 23, 2022.

=== Signature guitar and Jesu/Sun Kil Moon collaboration (2014–present) ===
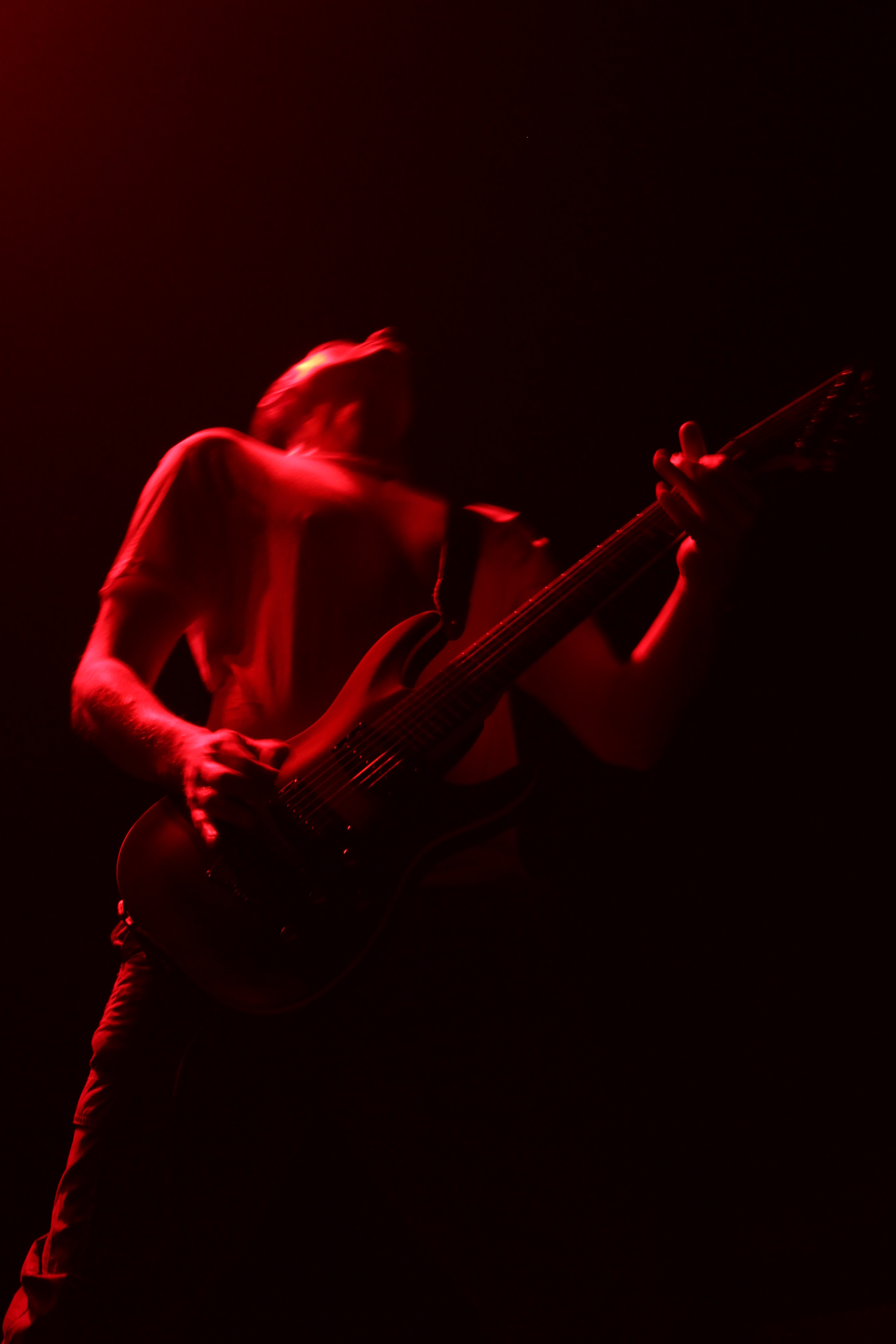
Broadrick performing with Godflesh in 2014

In 2002, since the inception of Jesu, Broadrick used a Schecter C-7 Diamond Series guitar tuned to A Standard.

In 2014, Blakhart Guitars released a Broadrick signature edition 8-string guitar. The guitar features a six-bolt Mono-blok neck to body mount, dual expanding truss rods and a string through body fixed bridge and was played by Broadrick for a short time before he switched to another company.

In January 2016, Broadrick's Jesu project collaborated with Mark Kozelek's folk rock project, Sun Kil Moon to record an album titled Jesu/Sun Kil Moon and the collaborative act toured in support of the album. Jesu and Sun Kil Moon collaborated once again to record a cover of "Condor Ave" for an Elliott Smith tribute album titled Say Yes!, released in October 2016. A second album by Jesu and Sun Kil Moon, titled 30 Seconds to the Decline of Planet Earth, was released in May 2017.

In June 2022, Broadrick produced a remix of the Hercules and Love Affair song "Poisonous Storytelling", which also featured the singer Anohni.

In 2026, Broadrick played the guitar on "Bobby" and "Best Dressed" from Phoebe Bridgers' album Lost Weekend. Bridgers approached Broadrick for a collaboration because she is a Jesu fan.

== Personal life ==
Broadrick was in a 13-year relationship that ended around the time Godflesh broke up in 2002. Broadrick resides in Abergele, Wales with his partner and his son.

In 2022, Broadrick was diagnosed with autism and post-traumatic stress disorder.
