= CzechTek 2005 =

- Date: 30 July 2005

Parties
Police	CzechTek

Lead figures
Vladislav Husák	

Number
1,200 policemen	5,000 people

Casualties and losses
89 injured	Over 35 injured

CzechTek in 2005 was a freetekno music festival in the Czech Republic on 29 July 2005. Taking place in a meadow next to the D5 motorway near Mlýnec in the Plzeň Region, the festival was raided the following day by riot police using heavy equipment including tear gas, water cannons and military BVP vehicles.

The ensuing clashes between police and revellers resulted in multiple injuries on both sides. Several dozen festival-goers were injured, fifteen seriously, and about fifty policemen were injured, five seriously. One participant was killed by a truck on his way to the festival in the early hours of the morning. The police damaged cars, electronic equipment and other property, and used tear gas and stun grenades in their operation.

The police intervention triggered protests outside the Czech Interior Ministry, and political debate about the proportionality of the repression measures. Czech president Václav Klaus criticized the police's use of heavy force, while Prime Minister Jiří Paroubek defended it. Several months after the clash, all charges against the police were dropped.

== Events ==
CzechTek 2005 was a smaller festival than previous years, attended by around 5,000 people, with just a few sound systems playing on the night from Friday to Saturday. More systems were plugged in during the day on Saturday, but played only very briefly or not at all. The event became centred around two walls, which played until Saturday at 21:30.

== Police attack ==
On Friday, the police blocked the exit from the highway for several hours; however, festival attendees parked their cars in nearby towns and side roads and arrived at the festival on foot. On Saturday, the police put an end to the event with two interventions of roughly 1,000 heavy-duty riot police, using heavy equipment including tear gas, water cannons and the military BVP vehicle. They cited damage to private property, and argued that the intervention was necessary to protect the surrounding land, whose owners had not given permission for their land to be used as access routes, unlike the landlord of the venue itself, who consented to the event.

The police damaged cars, electronic equipment and other property, used massive amounts of tear gas and stun grenades, and broke car windows with iron bars. Several dozen festival-goers were injured, 15 seriously, and about 50 policemen were injured, five seriously. One participant was killed by a truck on his way to the festival in the early morning hours.

The clashes resulted in many being hospitalized and in a serious condition. Doctors treated a total of 82 injured, including 47 police officers. 15 technicians were hospitalized, some with poisoning or fractured jaws. Five police officers were seriously injured; one of them lost movement in his legs after being hit in the spine with a stone. One of the participants was hit in the eye by a tear gas grenade, and suffered impaired vision requiring surgery. Later, the number of those treated was confirmed as approximately 100 people; 34 people were transported for further treatment, including 26 civilians and 8 police officers. According to the final report of the Plzeň Regional Rescue Service, many other injured participants of the techno party may not have sought medical treatment at the scene, and the number of injuries was therefore probably higher.

Several months after the clash, the investigation into the police response was dropped, in most cases due to failure to identify individual police officers, and in other cases because it was deemed that an offence had not been committed. No police officer was charged in connection with the intervention. On the other hand, nine festival participants were accused of attacking police officers. Three were acquitted by the court, and one was sentenced to a suspended sentence.

== Aftermath ==
The police intervention was widely criticised by the participants, sympathetic sections of the public, and some politicians, who said the response was disproportionately harsh, and in violation of the law and human rights.

The week after CzechTek, four demonstrations took place outside the Czech Interior Ministry in Prague with several thousand participants, as well as demonstrations in Brno, Plzeň, Ostrava and other cities. The protests were coordinated by the PolicejniStat.cz initiative, created a few hours after the events at CzechTek. There were also a series of protest concerts organised, entitled "We don't want a police state", which took place in several Czech cities on 1 September, and again on 28 September.

The techno community responded to the intervention with several large free parties, which went ahead peacefully in agreement with the local authorities. ParoubTek was held at the same location as CzechTek on the weekend of 17–18 September, followed a week later by DIY carnival in the streets of Prague.

The Czech president Václav Klaus criticized the police's use of heavy force, and the Senate called it unreasonable, while Prime Minister Jiří Paroubek, defended the action, declaring that the tekno fans were "not dancing children but dangerous people". Minister of the Interior František Bublan called for stricter legislation to prevent similar events from taking place in the future, but it was rejected. Later, the Ministry of Interior prepared a draft "decree against the techno party".

Among the political parties that condemned the intervention were the Green Party, Civic Democrats (ODS) and also the radical-left association REVO. The Social Democrats (ČSSD) defended the intervention. KDU-ČSL and the Communist Party did not take a clear position.

In April 2006, there was a march followed by a free party in Strasbourg, France to protest against police repression in general and against the actions of the Czech police in closing CzechTek specifically. In 2009, the attack on CzechTek was cited as one of the causes of the youth protests against Jiří Paroubek and ČSSD during the European Parliament election campaign.
