= Maitreya Festival =

Annual music festival in Melbourne, Australia

The Maitreya Festival (sometimes spelt Maitreyah festival) is a large outdoor music festival held yearly in Melbourne, Australia. The festival generally plays a mixture of psytrance and techno, and has a large associated Alternative community. It has grown considerably in size over its 10-year history, with the event starting with 2000 people, building to attract 10,000 attendees in 2015, its 9th year of operation. In terms of outdoor electronic music events (commonly known as Doofs or Bush Doofs in Australia, this makes it the third biggest after Rainbow Spirit Festival and Earthcore. It is the largest psytrance event in Australia. Maitraya has been said as some to be more “Ideaologically in tune” and less commercial.

Like Rainbow Serpent and Earthcore, Maitreya has traditionally been run on properties, public spaces in country Australia, 3/4 hours out of Melbourne. Apart from featuring International and Australian DJs, the event features workshops, art exhibitions, performance, markets and food. Attendees often highlight the non-commercial nature of Maitreya, and regular attendees catch up with friends they see every year. Australia has a worldwide reputation for popular outdoor events, with four large events in Victoria Rainbow Serpent, Yemaya and Maitreya, Subsonic and Burning Seed in NSW, and Earth Frequency, Happy Dayze in Queensland.

The Festival has remained to a certain degree, true to its roots, using volunteers to assist the production, respecting aboriginal culture, and has a focus on respecting the environment. Maitreya has specifically focused on being green and causing as little impact on the environment as possible, by implementing sustainability plans, and using measures such as recycling, encouraging attendees to take their waste home, and reusing food waste as pig food for local farms.

== History ==
The first Maitreya festival was held in 2008 and was originally planned to be held in Elaine because another large festival, Meredith, was being held in the Grampians. First even originally holding 2000 people, it was slightly controversial over the noise limits. The event was entitled "Art, Music, Culture Explosion, and featured a relatively small lineup, including Dick Trevor, Cosmosis, Phony Orphants, Sensifeel, Atmos and Psyseek.

It was then held 7–10 March 2008, including DJs such as Deeper and Funk in public. The third Maitreya was held near Tongal, 179 km south of Melbourne. Police attended and pulled over a number of vehicles, but only made two arrests.

Second Maitrey was held 6–9 March 2009 and featured a number of overseas psytrance DJs including Etnica, Human Traffic, Antix, Freq and Andromeda. The event included an art competition, including a $10,000 art prize.

2010 saw things get muddy. 2011 saw the festival move to the racecourse. The event was held at Carisbrook's harness racing track site, which differed from its usual bush setting. Despite this, the 2011 event, was regarded as a success, with the numbers by this stage increasing to 2500, and attracting international attendees. The event was also held there in 2012. While regarded as a successful event, it did cause some issues with noise as it was centrally located. After two years, the council moved the Festival out of Carisbrook, largely because of noise complaints, but noted the loss of revenue. 2012 also saw the festival run at Carisbrook racecourse, and featured a range of artists including Ace Ventura, Nerso, Zen Mechanics, Liquid Ace, The Riddler and laughing Buddha.

Because of the central location, while businesses welcomed the influx of business associated with the event, noise issues affected the general community. Following council action, it was then relocated to Buloke Council area.

On 11–14 March 2013, the event was happily running at Green Lake, near Malee in Victoria. Following concerns from the council at Carisbrook, the event was swiftly moved at the last minute to the new site, with the support of Buloke Shire Council. The line up once again featured a range of artists, including Ace Ventura, Alex Smoke, Basic, Chromatone, E-Clip, Grouch, Headroom, Human Element / DJ Martin, Hypnocoustics, Jiser, Klopfgeister, LOUD, Young Kim, Mad Maxx. By this stage, the event was still relatively small, with 2500 people attending.

2014 also saw Maitreya held in the same area, and this year featured artists such as Antix/Fiord, Child, Timmus, Moodmachine, Yahel Sherman, Cid Inc., Fabio & Moon, Dick Trevor, Major 7, Sonic Species, Symphonix, Ecliptic, Burn In Noise, Circuit Breakers, Perfect Stranger (musician), X-Noise, Antix & Ford, Tron. It also saw an afterparty held in Melbourne, which featured Yahel Sherman, Perfect Stranger and Major 7.

2015 saw the event move to the lakeside at Charlton Victoria. Artists here included Terrafractyl, Unseen Dimension, Basic, Ozzy, Jekyll, Interpulse, Sekkt, Hypnagog, Tom Cosm, U-One, Staunch, Timmus, Dark Nebula and Mood Machine and internationals DJ Tristan, E-Clip, Tube & Berger.

=== Buloke Shire cancellation and collapse in 2016 ===
2016 saw the event not going ahead due to refusal by the Shire of Buloke council administration to grant permission, with the council blaming Maitreya for submitting their paperwork late, while critics of the council suggesting that it was the Council's fault for embargoing paperwork which delayed the process.

While the council said that the correct paperwork had not been supplied on time, conversely, upon appeal to VCAT, VCAT suggested the event go ahead under a council clause that meant some of the paperwork was not necessary. The Council declined VCATs advice, and still refused to allow the event to run, and asked VCAT to ban the event. Local residents, some facing huge financial loss, protested, including starting an online petition asking the Council to allow the event to run.

Maitreya was proposed to run on a different site, however, the event was officially cancelled when the backup site was flooded. An FOI request was put to the council asking for copies of the internal documents dealing with the matter, but the Council refused to hand over the paperwork. The failure of the event to run and the losses made it unlikely the event would ever run again.

Following the cancellation of the festival, confusion arose over refunds for the more than $1 million in tickets sold through Trybooking. After initial confusion about legal responsibility for refunds was clarified by Consumer Affairs Victoria, the ticketing platform refunded $520,524 to customers, and subsequently filed proceedings in the Victorian Supreme Court seeking $409,082 in damages.
