= Jílovice =

Jílovice may refer to places in the Czech Republic:

- Jílovice (České Budějovice District), a municipality and village in the South Bohemian Region
- Jílovice (Hradec Králové District), a municipality and village in the Hradec Králové Region
