= Tekno =

Tekno may refer to:

- Tekno (musician), Nigerian singer-songwriter sometimes referred to as Jkay
- Tekno (toy manufacturer), toy maker from Copenhagen, Denmark
- Tekno Autosports, Australian motor racing team
- Tekno the Robotic Puppy, robotic toy
- Free tekno, music genre
  - Freetekno, a cultural movement associated with the music genre

== See also ==
- Techno, a genre of electronic music
