= Vinca Petersen =

British photographer

Vinca Petersen (born c. 1973) is a British photographer and artist, living on the Isle of Skye. Her photography book No System documents her life in the 1990s, travelling around Europe with sound systems, putting on free parties. Petersen's work has been shown in group exhibitions at Tate Modern, Turner Contemporary and Saatchi Gallery, and is held in the collections of the Victoria and Albert Museum, National Portrait Gallery, London and Arts Council Collection.

== Life and work ==
Petersen was born in Seoul, South Korea. She lived in Romania and Sweden and then moved to the UK with her family at age six. She started taking photographs at about age 7. In 1989 she left home, aged seventeen, and moved into a squat in London. She worked as a model, appearing in i-D and The Face.

In 1994 Petersen bought a campervan. Between then and 2004, she travelled around Europe with various sound systems, putting on free parties. She occasionally returned to London for modeling work. While on the road she made diaristic photographs, encouraged by her friend the photographer Corinne Day. Photographs from this period in the 1990s were collected in the book No System (1999). The work is distinctive for its proximity to the subject; photography by people within the rave scene at the time was uncommon, with cameras discouraged due to the illegal nature of some activities.

Drawing from her archive, Future Fantasy (2017) is a collection of photographs from Petersen's life aged 16 to 24 as well as flyers, love letters and other ephemera. It also includes photographs by Day of Petersen, and artwork by Ben Freeman (AKA Ben Ditto).

Deuce and a Quarter (2018) documents a US road trip that Petersen made with Day, Rosemary Ferguson and Susie Babchick in 1999. They drove a 1970s Buick Electra 225 from Houston to Austin, through the Texas Hill Country, down to the Mexican border and beyond. The book's title is street lingo for the Electra 225.

As of 2019 she lived in Ramsgate, where she co-founded a social art charity, Future Youth Project (FYP). As of 2022 she lives on the Isle of Skye.

== Publications ==
- No System. Göttingen: Steidl, 1999. Photographs, letters, diary entries and notes by Petersen. Edited by Michael Mack. ISBN 9783882436457.
  - London: Mack, 2020. ISBN 978-1527265639.
- Future Fantasy. London: Ditto, 2017. Photographs, flyers, letters and other ephemera by Petersen, with photographic contributions by Corinne Day, and artwork by Ben Freeman.
  - London: Ditto, 2019. Edition of 1150 copies.
- Deuce and a Quarter. London: IDEA, 2018. Photographs by Petersen. Edition of 1000 copies.

== Group exhibitions ==
- Sweet Harmony: Rave | Today, Saatchi Gallery, London, 2019. Included Petersen's A Life of Subversive Joy.
- Seaside Photographed, Turner Contemporary, Margate, 2019
- Diaristic Photography and the Photobook, Tate Modern, London, 2019

== Collections ==
Petersen's work is held in the following permanent collection:

- Arts Council Collection, UK
- National Portrait Gallery, London: 1 print (as of 30 December 2022)
- Victoria and Albert Museum, London: 4 prints (as of September 2020)
