= Josef Quinteros =

Spanish musician

Bansi Quinteros
- Also known as: Bansi
- Born: Josef Quinteros; 20 May 1976; Barcelona, Spain
- Died: 19 June 2018 (aged 42)
- Genres: Psychedelic trance Progressive trance Progressive house
- Occupation: Musician
- Instruments: Keyboards; Programming
- Website: http://www.gms-music.com/

Josef "Bansi" Quinteros (20 May 1976 – 19 June 2018) was a Spanish trance keyboardist. Together with his production partner Shajahan "Riktam" Matkin, he was in the groups G.M.S. (Growling Mad Scientists), Riktam & Bansi, Zorba, 1200 Micrograms (with Raja Ram and DJ Chicago), Alien Jesus (with Olli Wisdom and Jon Klein), Soundaholix (with Celli Fermi), Systembusters (with Filippo Scrimizzi and Francesco D'Amato), Growling Mad Synchro (with Jeroen van Garling), Growling Moon Spirits (with Celli Firmi, Frederic Talaa, Jean-Baptiste Lafitte, and Sebastian Claro), Growlmonizer (with Simon Posford), Meathead Productions (with Frédéric Holyszewski, Sound Farmers (with Celli Firmi and Sebastian Claro), Electric Scientists (with Boris Blenn), and many more. Without Riktam, he also collaborated with Ron Rothfield and Sastra Rothfield in the band Visible Sound, with Jan Willem Bot in the group Growling Virus, and with Avi Algranati in the group Inner Reflextions.

== Biography ==
Quinteros was born in Barcelona, Spain.

He specialized in genres such as psychedelic trance, progressive trance, and progressive house.

Quinteros died on 19 June 2018, from a rare form of blood cancer known as multiple myeloma at the age of 42.
