= Freetekno =

Cultural movement formed around loose collectives

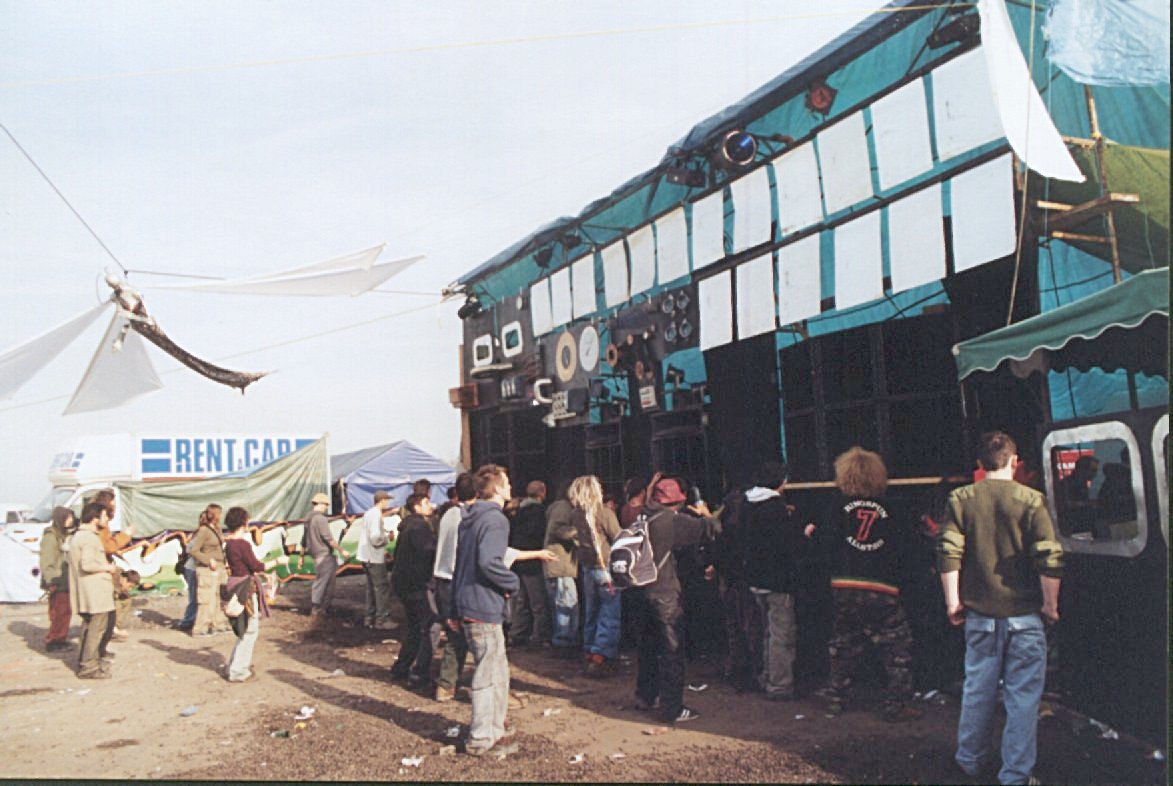
Freetekno

Freetekno is a cultural movement that is present in Europe, Australia and North America. Freetekno sound systems or tribes form in loose collectives, frequently with anarchist philosophies. These sound systems join to hold parties wherever a viable space can be found – typical locations include warehouses (also known as squat parties), fields, abandoned buildings or forests. Because freetekno parties are usually held illegally this sometimes leads to clashes with the police, as was the case at both the 2004 and 2005 Czechtek festivals and many other, smaller parties around the world at different times.

== Music ==
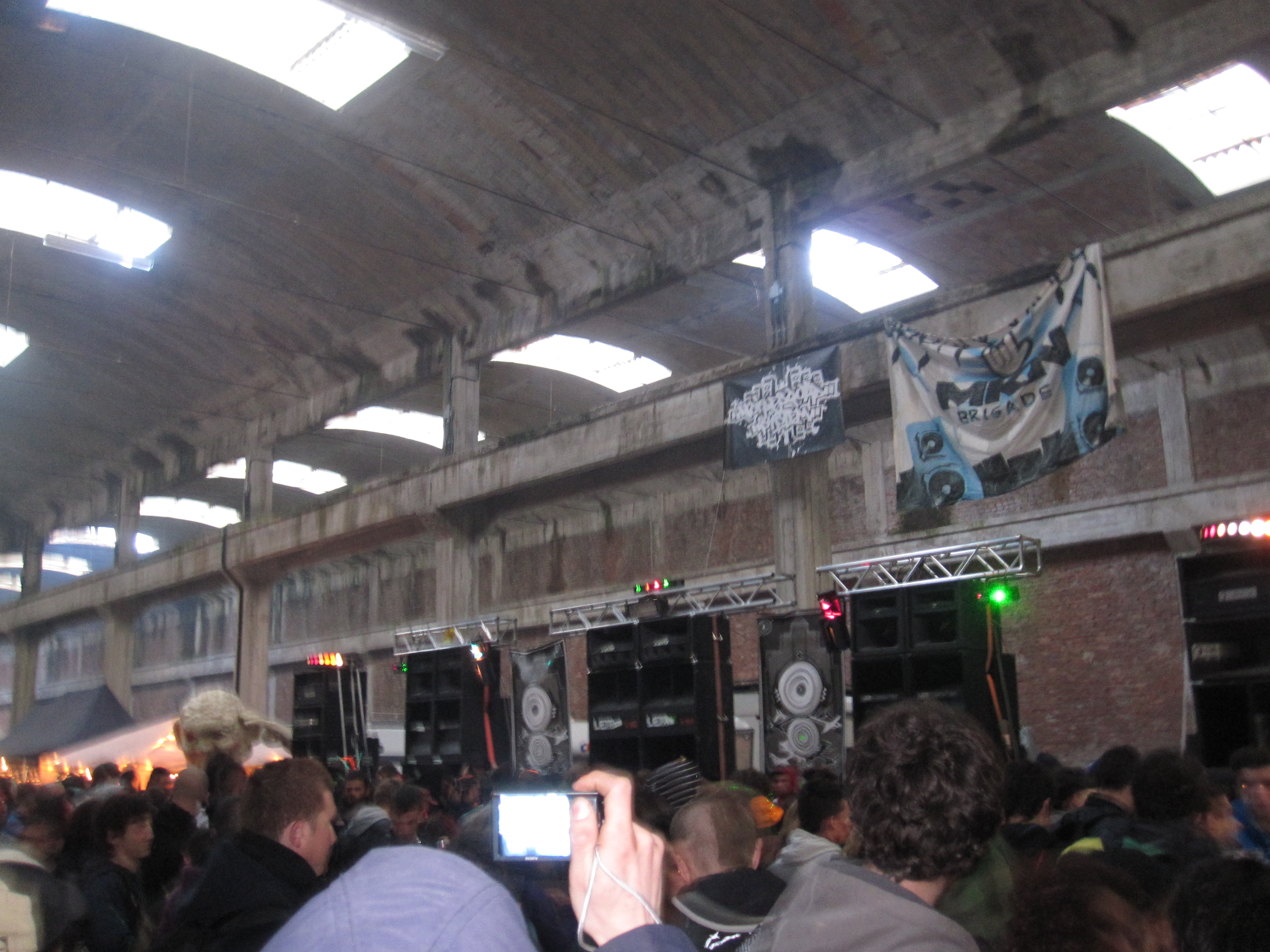
Freetekno party

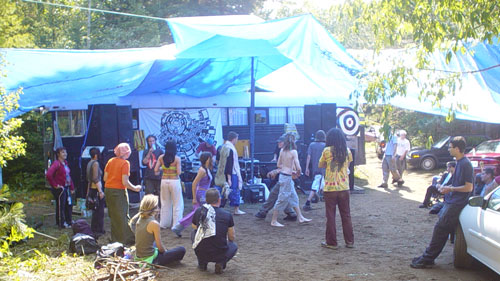
Freeteknitians at Teknival 2004, Ontario, Canada

Tekno or hardtek is also a style of music which takes elements from both techno and hardcore, generally high-tempo and energetic. Speedbass, speedcore and other forms of underground music can be heard at freetekno parties. Not all Freetekno events play hardcore (especially the Frenchcore subgenre); psychedelic trance, happy hardcore, hardstyle, drum and bass, breakbeats, glitch, electro, world beat, house, techno, trance, and experimental fusion music are also present at freetekno events.

== History ==
The freetekno movement appeared in first half of the 1990s in the United Kingdom and in the same decade was strong in Austria, Belgium, the Czech Republic, France, Italy and the Netherlands. It also spread to Canada, Germany, the Pacific Northwest region of the United States, Poland, Slovakia, Spain, Switzerland and Romania.

Freetekno parties are intended as an example of a Temporary Autonomous Zone. In summer, large Freetekno parties, known as teknivals, attract thousands of people and can last a week or longer, with dozens of sound systems attend.

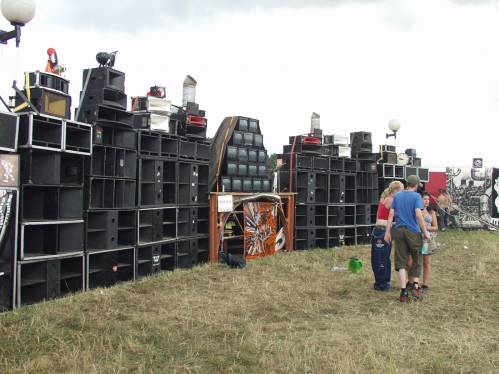
A soundsystem at Czechtek 2004

== Regional scenes ==
=== United Kingdom ===
London in the United Kingdom plays host to "free parties" (term used by the squat party scene) thrown by an array of sound systems every week. A regular theme is (and always has been) tekno, although drum & bass, breakbeat, hardcore and psytrance can be common. Parties will occur all over London from derelict/deserted buildings in the borough of Hackney to empty office blocks in the City of London. However, the South West of England is generally considered to have the best free party 'vibe' due to beautiful locations of the raves, as well as the welcoming nature of all those attending. In contrast to London, the music played in the south west is generally drum and bass, jungle, jungletek, raggatek, 4x4 and hardtek.

=== Germany ===
Tekk, also known as Tekke or Hardtekk, is a musical genre primarily originating in the eastern part of Germany, gaining prominence in the 1990s. Known for its distinctive rhythm, Tekk, classified as a form of dance music, distinguishes itself by accentuating a pronounced rhythmic structure. The term "Tekk" evolved to become synonymous with hardcore dance music, with the conspicuous use of the letter "k" serving as an advertising strategy to signify the hardness of the sound at events and compilations (Tekno, Tekkno, Tekkkno). A parallel variant emerged with the rise of the Freetekno scene, creating a dynamic interplay with the evolving landscape of Tekk. The sonic identity of Tekk is often described as "dumb" or "asozial/assi," characterized by heavy, monotone kicks and repetitive vocals, which can be compared to Schranz.

== See also ==
- Free party
- Free tekno
- Teknival
- Sound system (DJ)
- List of electronic music festivals
