= Mindless =

Mindless may refer to:

- Mindless (film) (Meeletu), a 2006 Estonian comedy film or the play on which it's based
- Mindless, an unreleased American indie horror film with executive producer Michael Biehn
- Mindless Records, a personal record label owned by Keith Richards
- "Mindless", a 1992 song from Cool World (soundtrack)
- "Mindless", a 2003 song from Entheogenic album Spontaneous Illumination
- "Mindless", a 2010 song from Daysend's album Within the Eye of Chaos
