= Doof Shed =

Small nightclub

- Address: Sydney; Australia
- Owner: Labrakis twins
- Operator: Labrakis twins
- Seating type: none
- Capacity: 7
- Type: nightclub
- Event: Doof
- Record attendance: 7
- Field size: 1.53 by 0.74 metres (5 ft 0 in × 2 ft 5 in)

Construction
- Groundbreaking: 2021
- Opened: 23 June 2021
- Years active: 2021-
- Builders: Harry Nathan Labrakis; Evangelos "Boonie" Labrakis

Website
- doofshed.com

The Doof Shed is a small, portable nightclub created by twins Harry Nathan and Evangelos "Boonie" Labrakis. It holds a Guinness World Record for being the smallest nightclub in the world, measuring 1.53 by 0.74 metres (5 ft 0 in × 2 ft 5 in) and fitting seven people. It beat previous record holder, Club 28 in Rotherham, England.

Doof is an Australian term for an outdoor dance party, derived from the sound of the kick drum used in electronic music.

== History and description ==
The Doof Shed, measuring 1.53m x 0.74m x 1.88m, was built and furnished in Sydney, Australia from a repurposed corrugated metal shed with the help of the twins' father to fill a need after the COVID-19 pandemic in Australia upended Sydney's nightclub scene. The exterior graffiti-style logo was applied in bright neon paint while the interior contains hallmarks typical of a nightclub, including a fog machine, smart lighting, a disco ball and a Pioneer DJ setup. The capacity of the nightclub is just 7 people, potential patrons must enter a ballot on DoofShed.com.
