= CzechTek =

Electronic music festival in the Czech Republic (1994-2006)

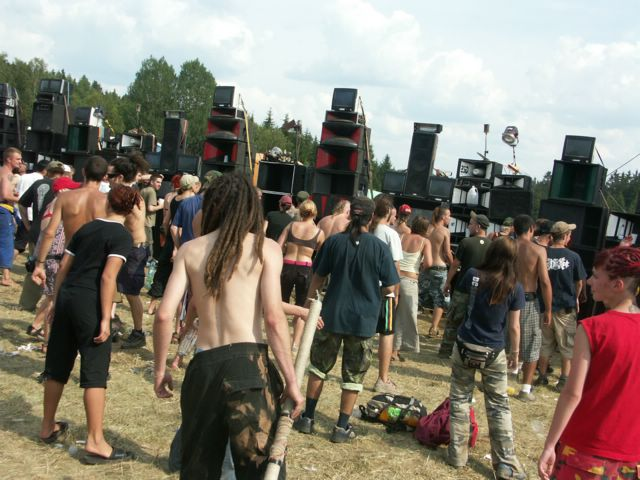
- CzechTek 2004
- Genre: Electronic music
- Location: Czech Republic
- Years active: 1994–2006
- Attendance: 40,000+

CzechTek was an annual teknival normally held on the weekend at the end of July in the Czech Republic. It attracted thousands of free tekno dancers from several European countries (40,000 people attended in 2003 and 2006). Open invitations were usually made to all sound systems, performers and all people with positive thinking.

== History ==
The first CzechTek was held in 1994 at Hostomice, it was organized by the Spiral Tribe sound system and a group of artists called the Mutoid Waste Company. Various foreign sound systems also attended. The festival was held at the same location the following two years. After that the festival was held in a different location in the Czech Republic each year, usually on ex-military land or in a meadow near a forest. The location of the meeting was always revealed one day before the event on Czech rave websites. Unlike more commercial festivals such as Love Parade or the Street Parade there was little or no organisation, though later teknivals required organisation due to large numbers of attendees.

Date	Location	Legality
28 July – ? 1994	Hostomice	Legal
26 July – ? 1995	Hostomice	Legal
26–28 July 1996	Hostomice	Legal
25–27 July 1997	Stará Huť	Legal
30 July – 4 August 1998	Stará Huť	Legal
30 July - 4 August 1999	Ralsko-Hradčany	Illegal
28 July – 2 August 2000	Jílovice-Lipnice	Illegal
27–30 July 2001	Doksy	Illegal
26–31 July 2002	Višňová-Andělka	Legal
25 July – 3 August 2003	Kopidlno-Ledkov	Legal
30 July – 3 August 2004	Chodová Planá-Boněnov	Illegal
29–31 July 2005	Přimda-Mlýnec	Legal*
27–30 July 2006	Hradiště Military Training Area	Legal

== CzechTek 2005 ==
CzechTek 2005 took place in Přimda-Mlýnec in Tachov District, close to the German border in the west of the country. The organisers claimed to have permission from the landowner to set up the event, but shortly after the festival began, around 1,000 riot police arrived, using heavy equipment including tear gas, water cannons and the military BVP vehicle. Police cited damage to private property, and argued that the owners of the neighbouring properties had not agreed to allow access to vehicles and that the authorities had not been informed of the event.

The police damaged cars, electronic equipment and other property, and clashes between police and revellers resulted in multiple injuries on both sides. Police used massive amounts of tear gas and stun grenades, broke car windows with iron bars or threw gas grenades in. One participant was killed by a truck on his way to the festival in the early morning hours. Several dozen festival-goers were injured, fifteen seriously, and about fifty policemen were injured, five seriously.

Following the police actions there were protests outside the Czech Interior Ministry. The Czech president Václav Klaus criticized the police's use of heavy force. The Prime Minister, Jiří Paroubek, defended the action, declaring that the tekno fans were "not dancing children but dangerous people".

Several months after the clash, all charges against police were dropped, in most cases due to failure to identify individual police officers, and in other cases because it was deemed that an offence had not been committed. In April 2006, there was a march followed by a free party in Strasbourg, France to protest against police repression in general and against the actions of the Czech police in closing CzechTek specifically.

== CzechTek 2006 ==
On 14 June 2006 an agreement was signed between the Czech Army and the Association of Czech Sound Systems. The festival was held on land which was part of the Hradiště Military Region. Close cooperation with the state administration caused some resentment among the freetekno community, but the festival went ahead without any repeat of the previous year's violence.

== Czechtek discontinued ==
After the event in 2006, the co-ordinators announced on the official CzechTek website that the festival had been discontinued, stating that "in regard of the fact that the situation around Czechtek isn't bearable anymore, the representatives of the Czech freetekno community came to this radical decision. This year, and very probably even never again, any action of size and under the name Czechtek won't be realized". The reasons given were:

- step-by-step abolition of original thoughts of freetekno
- parasitic behaviour of people not connected to the scene, including many of the visitors themselves
- disability and reluctance to respect the elementary principles of behaviour in shared space

The announcement was signed by: Oktekk, Strahov, NSK, AKA.IO, Komatsu, Spiritual, Mayapur, Layka, Pentatonika, Merkur, Fatal Noise, Matchbox, Luxor, Cirkus Alien, Vosa, Bazooka, Koryto, Shamanic, Zuqwa, Czajovna, Figura, Machine Works, Metro, Ultimate Crew, Basswood, Mutaphone, FDM, Jednota, TMC, NabaziGangoo, Massive Elementz, UANDU Tribe, MHD, Hondzik Sound, Witacid, Iluzor, Detox23, Pandemic, Spectro, Radiator, Swampsound, Gummo, EskanoiZZe, Tsunami, Yaga, Synthetik, MiMiK, Squakka, Mandala, Alkaline, Dynamodestroy, Triptekk, Tekkirk, Remek, FSS, Shadow cabaret, Invaders, Mushroom, Bassmekk, Swazarm, Techamin, Laydakk, Othersidesystem, Inkognito, T2B and others.

== See also ==
- List of electronic music festivals
- Teknival
- Spiral Tribe
- DIY Culture
