= Entheogenic (band) =

French musical project

- Genres: Psytrance, Downtempo, Psybient, ambient, chill-out
- Years active: 1999–present
- Labels: c.o.r.n. recordings, Chillcode Records
- Members: Piers Oak-Rhind and Helmut Glavar
- Website: www.entheogenic.net

Entheogenic is a musical project consisting of Piers Oak-Rhind and Helmut Glavar that crosses musical style boundaries. Since the early 1980s, the Austrian musician and songwriter Helmut Glavar has founded a variety of bands, ranging from punk and funk to new wave and drums-and-bass. Piers Oak-Rhind was born in England and has been a sound designer, programmer and musician since the early 1990s. He studied guitar at the London School of Guitar. According to the two members, the music mixes "coloristic electrophonics" with "impressionistic orchestra-like sound".

The use of both eastern and western vocals, tribal-sounding instruments, and an array of synthesizers built the foundation of the Entheogenic sound.

== History ==
=== Background ===
Entheogenic was formed in 1999 by producer, engineer, and songwriter Piers Oak-Rhind and Helmut Glavar. The duo met while working for Emagic (a former producer of music-studio software and hardware such as Logic, acquired by Apple Inc. in 2002). The name Entheogenic is derived from the term Entheogen coined in 1979 by a group of ethnobotanists and mythology scholars to describe psychedelic substances used in a religious or shamanic context.

==== German "Chill-Out" charts ====
In November 2003, Entheogenic's second album, Spontaneous Illumination, released on the German label C.O.R.N. Recordings, was the first psy-chill album ever to make it to number 1 in the German charts, where it remained Number 1 for 8 weeks and stayed in the Top 10 for an additional 12 weeks.

== Discography ==
=== Albums ===
- Entheogenic (3dVISION 2002)
- Spontaneous Illumination (C.O.R.N. Recordings 2003)
- Dialogue of the Speakers (Chillcode 2005)
- Golden Cap (Chillcode 2006)
- Flight of the Urubus (USR 2008)
- Gaia Sophia (USR 2011)
- Anthropomorphic (Universal Symbiosis Records, 2013)
- Enthymesis (2014)
- A Singularity Encoded (2015)
- Dreamtime Physics (2017)
- Kykeon (2018)
- Hypatia (2019)
- Animism (2020)
- Meltwater Pulse 1B (2021)
- Kailash (2023)
- Oddiyana (2024)

=== Singles and contributions for compilations ===
- Liquid Universe - Entheogenic
- Sideways (Jong rmx) - Chiller Vol. 1 - Chillcode Records
- Kashmir day trip (Kuba rmx)- Chiller Vol. 1 - Chillcode Records
- Sideways - Kumhara Lounge Ibiza Vol 5

Distant Eyes - Ibiza Chillout Special Classic Mix Edition 3

Golden Cap - Downbeat Liquid Vol.1 - Chillcode Records

Sacred Man - Goa Trance Vol.5 - Yellow Sunshine Explosion

Spaced (Shulman rmx) Random Thoughts - Aleph Zero Records

Spaced - Cosmophilia Vol.2 - Cosmophilia

Walking on Air - Quality Relaxation - Chill Tribe Records

We are One - Muladhara "AC" - 666 Records

Ground Luminosity - Global Psychedelic Trance Vol.9 - Spirit Zone Recordings

Habitual Overtones - Global Psychedelic Trance Vol.9 - Spirit Zone Recordings

Pagan Dream Machine - Global Psychedelic Trance Vol.9 - Spirit Zone Recordings

Mindless - Global Psychedelic Trance Vol.9 - Spirit Zone Recordings

Invisible Landscape - Global Psychedelic Trance Vol.9 - Spirit Zone Recordings

Twilight Eyes - Global Psychedelic Trance Vol.9 - Spirit Zone Recordings

Spaced - Global Psychedelic Trance Vol.9 - Spirit Zone Recordings

Invisible Landscape - Module 01 - 3dVISION / Relax
