= Gardenzitty =

Czech soundsystem

Gardenzitty was a well-known Czech soundsystem from Prague playing drum and bass. During their career they became one of the favourite sound systems on the Czech jungle-music scene. They were influenced with several music styles like reggae dancehall, old school hardcore jungle, bhangra, drum and bass and many others.

== Members ==
=== DJs ===
- Technical
- Alert
- Errphorz
- Shin
- F99
- Mara

=== MCs ===
- Dr. Kary
- Nu C
