= Electric universe =

Electric universe may refer to:

- Electric Universe (album), the 1983 studio album by Earth, Wind & Fire
- Electric Universe, a psychedelic trance music group from Germany
- Any of a number of outside-the-mainstream proposals regarding astrophysics; see, for example, Plasma cosmology
- Electric Universe: How Electricity Switched On the Modern World, a book by science writer David Bodanis
