= Doof =

Outdoor dance party

Bush doof
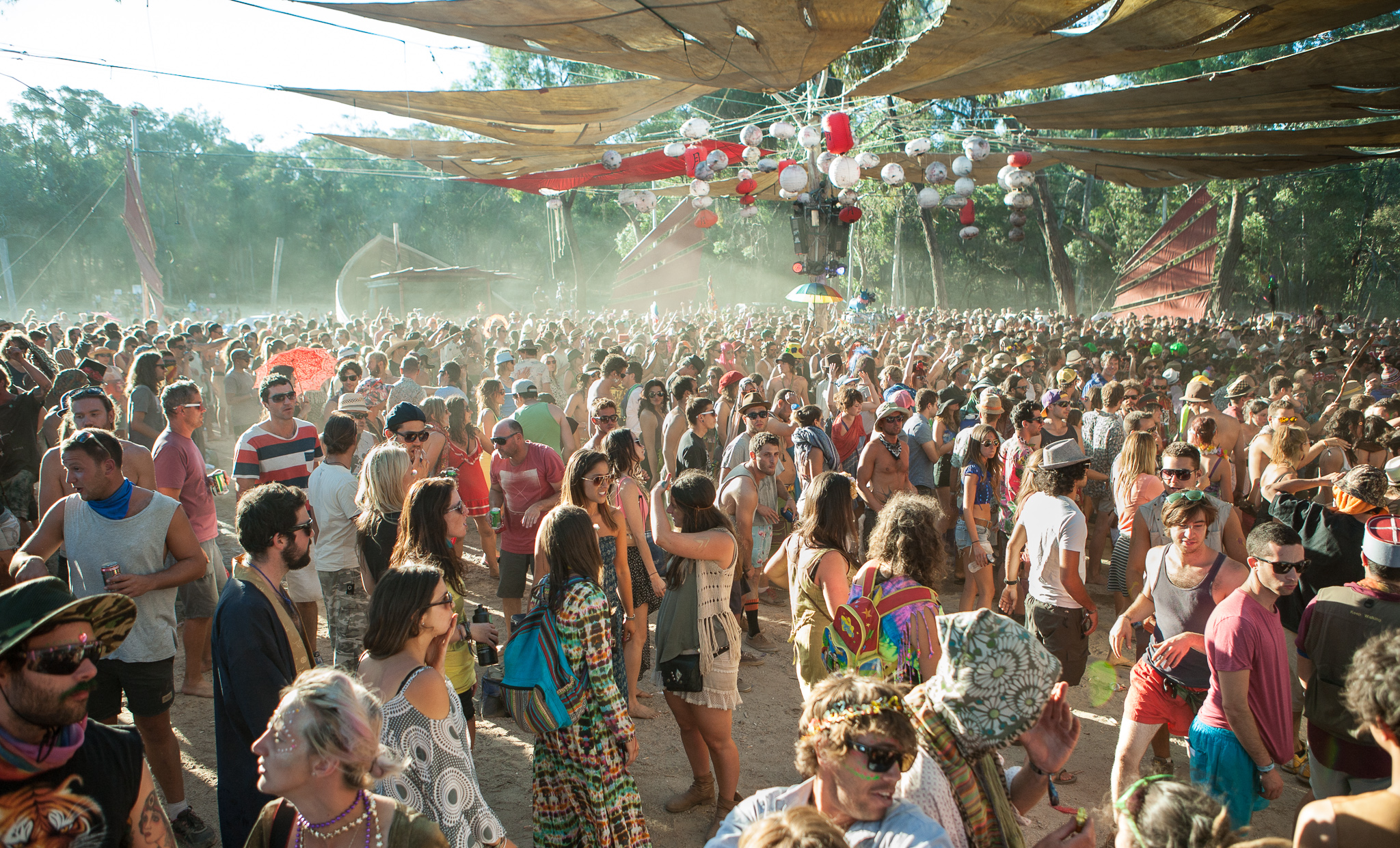
- Rainbow Serpent Festival 2013

General Information
- Related genres: Trance music, electronic dance music, goa, dub techno, psychedelic trance, ebm, industrial music, jungle music
- Location: Oceania, New Zealand, Australia
- Related events: Music festival, rave, trance festival, electronic dance music festival, teknival, free party

A doof or bush doof is a type of outdoor dance party generally held in a remote country area, or outside a large city in surrounding bush or rain-forest. The term doof was first popularized in Australia and New Zealand and can be repeated to varying degrees (e.g. "doof doof") depending on the speaker’s disposition, intended emphasis or simply as an explanatory means. The term has since gained international usage for similar events, often propagated by small sets of social groups to grow into a subculture with millions of active members, and is considered by some as a cultural movement. Doofs share many features with other outdoor parties scenes around the world, such as raves, teknivals and free parties. They often have healing workshops, speakers, art, live bands, performance art, and DJs playing a range of electronic music (most commonly psychedelic trance, goa, house, dub techno, Techno, and acid heavy sounds).

== Etymology ==
The name is onomatopoeic, and is derived from the sound of the kick drum used in the electronic music frequently lettered (as in "doof doof music"). According to Peter Strong, the original term "doof" was created in Newtown, Sydney in Spring 1992, after a neighbour of the Non Bossy Posse knocked on the door to complain about their music: "What is this Doof Doof Doof I hear all night long, this is not music" she exclaimed. The term did not become a popular designation for outdoor dance parties until after the mid-1990s.

== History ==
During the 1990s, free dance parties proliferated in Sydney, particularly in Sydney Park in St Peters and warehouses of the Inner West. As pressure from police and councils increased, holding parties in the bush appeared as a more viable option.

The first documented commercial "doof" parties in Australia were held in Sydney in 1993. The earliest recorded event was Vegetable Matter on 8 May 1993, produced by Vegetable Matter. The event took place in an abandoned supermarket on Dixon Street, Chinatown, with DJs such as Non Bossy Posse, Biz E, Sub Bass Snarl, Colour, Quang, Freebase, Comadose, Pulse, Todd, Michael MD, Patrick HAF, and Blau Dot. The decks were set up inside old fridges, and the entrance was through a back alley past old freezers. Many people wondered what was in them.

Later that month, on 26 May 1993, another significant doof event, Suck Acid Fest, was produced by Virtual Bass at 324 King Street, Newtown. The lineup featured DJs Vincent, Free Bass, Sub Bass Snarl, and Acid Masters.

Following these early Sydney events, Earthcore became notable as one of the first commercial bush doof parties in Melbourne, Victoria, later in 1993.

Today, the term 'doof' can describe anything from a small gathering in the bush focused around a small sound system to a multi-day, multi-stage event with DJs, bands, and workshops.

In 2013, "bush doof" was added to the sixth edition of the Macquarie Dictionary.

== List of doofs ==
- Earthcore (1992–2017)
- Rainbow Serpent Festival (1997–present)
- Maitreya Festival
- Mushroom Valley Festival
- Esoteric Festival
- Wild Horses Festival
- Interstellar Groove Festival
- Dragon Dreaming Festival
- Earth Frequency Festival
- Rabbits Eat Lettuce Festival
- Strawberry Fields Festival

== See also ==
- List of electronic music festivals
- List of festivals in Australia
