= Olli Wisdom =

British musician (1958–2021)

- Also known as: Space Tribe
- Born: Oliver John Wisdom; 8 March 1958; London, England
- Died: 22 August 2021 (aged 63) London, England
- Genres: Glam rock, gothic rock, deathrock, Goa trance, post-punk, psychedelic trance
- Occupations: Musician, singer, DJ
- Labels: Spirit Zone Records (1996–2004); Space Tribe Music (from 2004)

Oliver John Wisdom (8 March 1958 – 22 August 2021) was a British musician and clothing producer who lived in London. From the 1990s he recorded under the name Space Tribe.

== Early life and education ==
Olli Wisdom was the eldest son of Anthony Wisdom and his wife Charlotte (née Hartstein) and grew up in London and in Monmouth, Wales. He went to school in London and at Hereford Cathedral School in Hereford.

== Career in music ==
In the early 1980s Wisdom was the singer in the theatrical glam and gothic rock group Specimen, and co-founded and ran The Batcave, London's weekly goth club-night at the Gargoyle Club. Before forming Specimen and opening the Batcave, Wisdom was the frontman for the punk band The Unwanted. Their most popular song was a cover version of Nancy Sinatra's "These Boots Are Made for Walkin'". After the Unwanted, Wisdom joined Metroz for a few months.

Wisdom was a pioneer of psychedelic trance for many years. After Specimen split up, in 1986 he went travelling in Asia and in 1989 came to Ko Pha-ngan in Thailand, where he first encountered the electro-driven wild psychedelic parties on the beach. He stayed there for two years DJing and set up a small studio to make tracks for the parties before moving to Goa, India.

Over the next four years, Wisdom spent his time mostly in Goa, but started to travel elsewhere, DJing at parties in Japan, Switzerland, the UK and the United States. In 1993, with his brother Miki, and Richmond, he started Space Tribe clothing in Bali. In 1995, the first Space Tribe tracks were hatched in the studio with Simon Posford (Hallucinogen/Shpongle).

Wisdom moved to the rainforest in Byron Bay in Australia and set up the Rainforest Space Base studio. Space Tribe released its first album, Sonic Mandala, on Spirit Zone in 1996. In 2004 Space Tribe Music was set up as a record label, providing an outlet for Space Tribe releases and compilation albums. Space Tribe also made many tracks in collaboration with other artists such as GMS and CPU. His work with Electric Universe was sometimes released under the name ESP.

== Personal life ==
Wisdom had one daughter, born in 1996.

He died on 22 August 2021, at the age of 63, and was buried at St Pancras and Islington Cemetery on 13 September.

== Discography ==
=== Specimen ===
- Batastrophe (Sire Records, 1983)
- Azoic (Jungle Records, 1997)
- Electric Ballroom (Metropolis Records, 2007)
- Alive at the Batcave (Eyes Wide Shut Recordings, 2008)
- Wake the Dead (Batcave Music, 2013)

=== Space Tribe ===
- Sonic Mandala (Spirit Zone Records, 1996)
- The Ultraviolet Catastrophe (Spirit Zone Records, 1997)
- The Future's Right Now (Spirit Zone Records, 1998)
- 2000 O.D. (Spirit Zone Records, 1999)
- Religious Experience (Spirit Zone Records, 2000)
- Shapeshifter (Spirit Zone Records, 2001)
- Heart Beat (Spirit Zone Records, 2002)
- Time S-T-R-E-T-C-H (Spirit Zone Records, 2004)
- Collaborations (Space Tribe Music, 2004)
- Thru the Looking Glass (Space Tribe Music, 2005)
- Electro Convulsive Therapy (Space Tribe Music, 2008)
- Continuum Vol.1 (Space Tribe Music, 2011)
- Continuum Vol.2 (Space Tribe Music, 2011)
- Peak Experience (Space Tribe Music, 2011)
- Space between Atoms (Space Tribe Music, 2021)

=== ESP ===
- Electric Space Phenomenon (Space Tribe Music, 2006)
- Sensory Overload (Space Tribe Music, 2007)

=== Alien Jesus ===
- Open Your Eyes (Space Tribe Music, 2010)
- Time Machine (Space Tribe Music, 2012) (EP)

=== Mad Tribe ===
- Spaced Out (TIP Records, 2015)
- Amazing Tales from Outer Space (TIP Records, 2017)
