= Earthcore =

Former Australian outdoor dance music festival

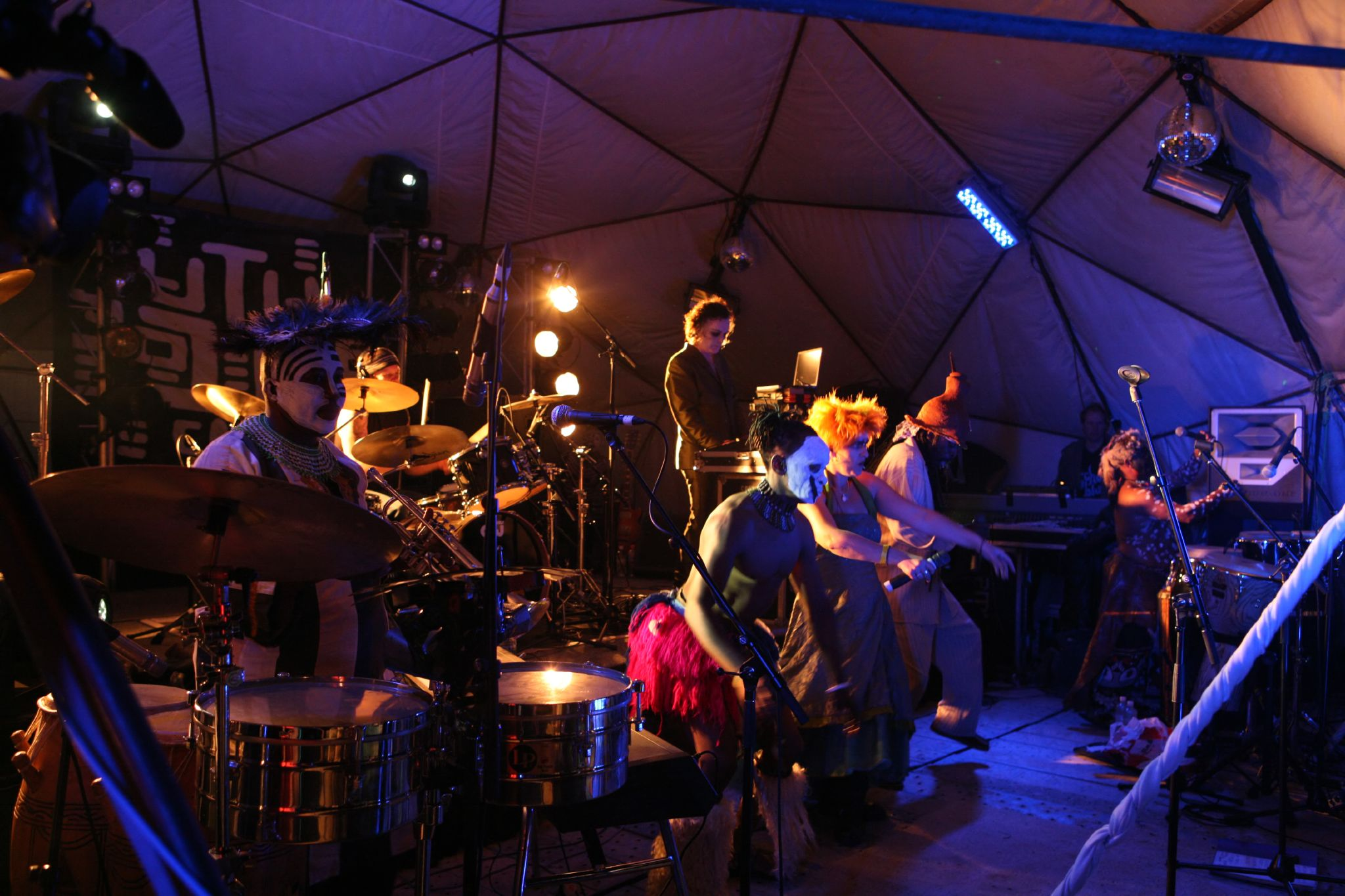
- Juno Reactor at Earthcore 04
- Genre: Electronic music
- Locations: Victoria, Australia, with some events held in Queensland and overseas in New Caledonia
- Years active: 1993–2018
- Website: Earthcore.com.au

Earthcore was an Australian outdoor dance music festival and electronic music event. The outdoor events were generally held in forest environments around Victoria, Australia, with some events held in Queensland and overseas in New Caledonia. Earthcore has operated since 1992. After the Earthcore Carnival that ran from the 28th to 30 November 2008, Earthcore took a hiatus before returning for their 20-year anniversary celebration in November 2013.

Earthcore returned to its traditional ground roots festival beginning with the 20 year anniversary in 2013 to celebrate the event that introduced Australia to the outdoor electronic dance music festival. With a new home amongst the rolling hills of Pyalong in country Victoria, Earthcore was again held in November 2014 with one of the largest lineups to date including favourites Hallucinogen and Shpongle as headliners. Earthcore continued to operate in Pyalong until 2016 and moved to Elmore Victoria for the 2017 festival.

== History ==
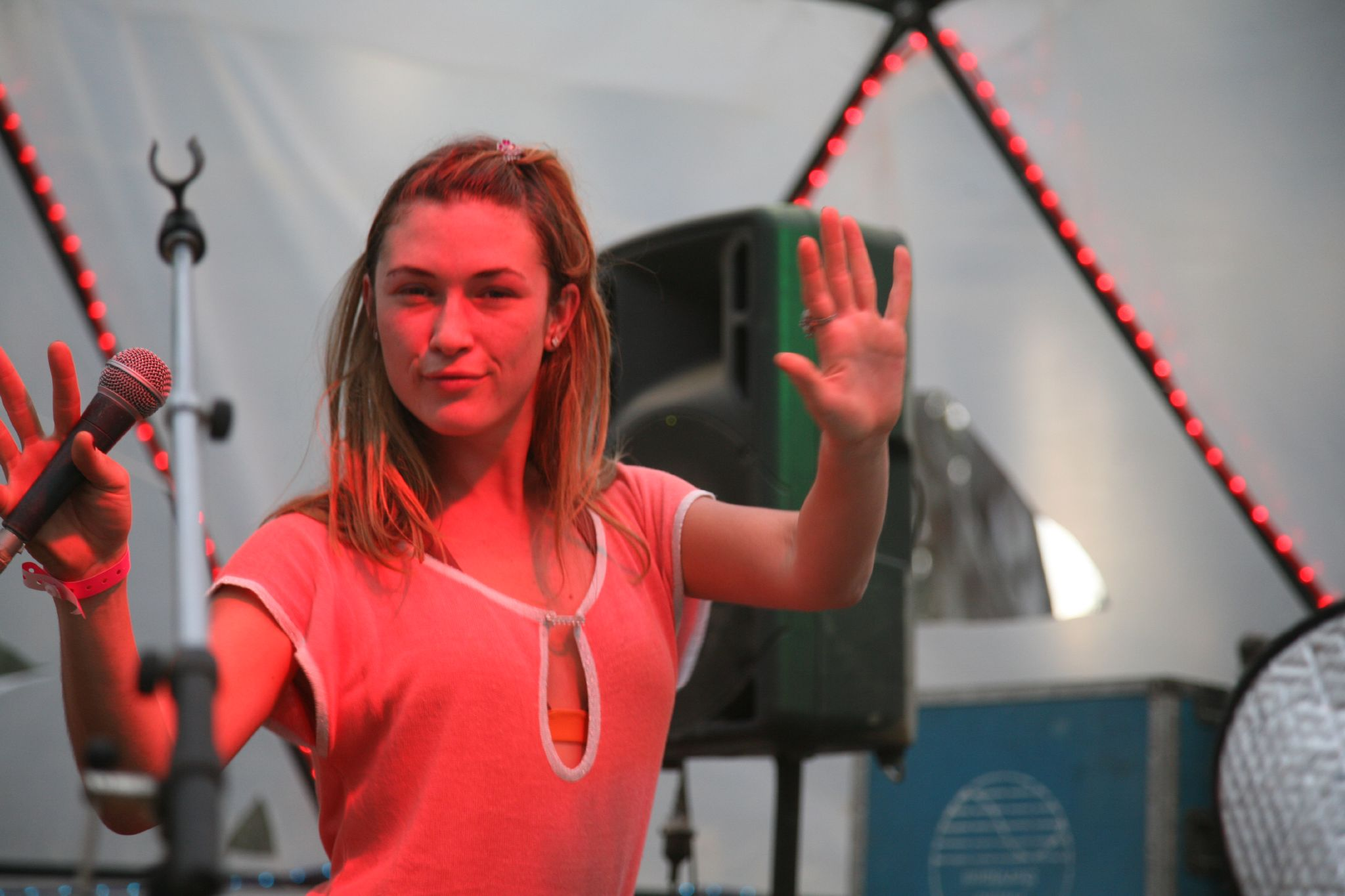
Michele Adamson at Earthcore 2006

Over the years, events included large outdoor festivals, one night weekly club events, warehouse parties, one-off large-scale indoor parties, events on boats and a club on a moving train. The peak Earthcore event was the 2000 New Year's Eve party which went for seven days and was attended by up to 15,000 people over the seven days.

== Controversies ==
In 2017, Earthcore events in three states were cancelled abruptly. Earthcore blamed the cancellations on what they alleged was a smear campaign by international artist Coming Soon. However, many of the bands countered that the cancellations were in fact because they hadn't been paid for their performances, and hadn't been given their air tickets, and so wouldn't be attending. The event "lost up to 32 acts" the day before the event, with the Herald Sun reporting "Many artists have posted disgruntled messages on their Facebook pages, many claiming they have not been paid and many saying their flights to Australia had not been booked". This included a number of the headlining acts, such as Juno Reactor, Animato and Electric Universe. Earthcore then alleged that many artists were paid and kept the fees and did not perform. In all, the Western Australia, New South Wales & Queensland events were cancelled, the Victorian event proceeded with a reduced lineup.

A number of companies relating to the management of Earthcore have suffered from financial problems.

Spiro Boursinos, a.k.a. Spiro Boursine, founder and main organiser of Earthcore, died on the 24th of October, 2018, leaving the future of the events unknown, including an upcoming large scale event meant to celebrate the 25th anniversary of the event.

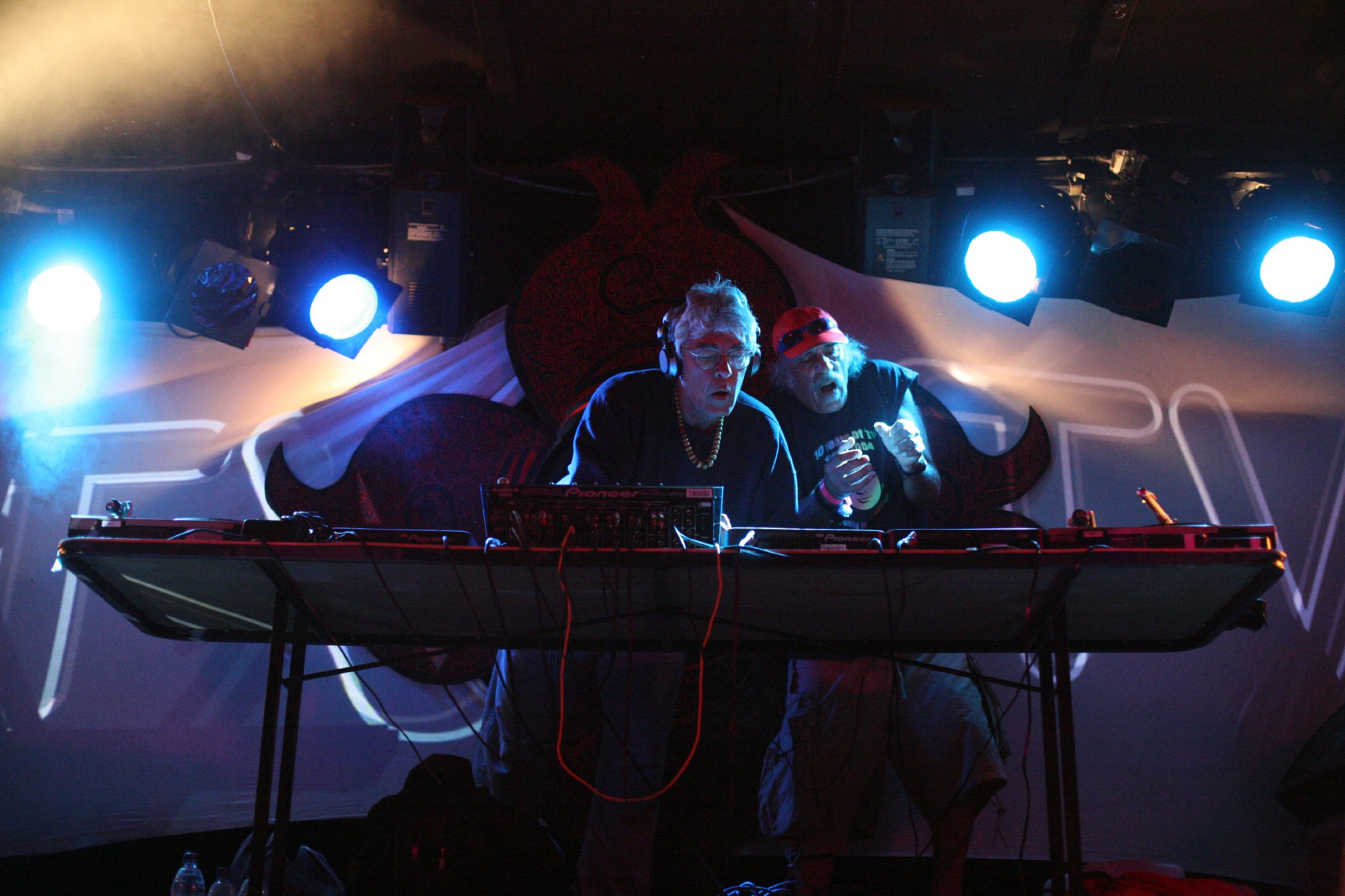
Raja Ram & Chicago at Earthcore 2006

== Closure of the Event ==
The final earthcore was held in 2017. The 25th Anniversary Earthcore was planned for November 2018, with artists booked and a venue in place, but the main organiser, Spiro Boursine, passed away only weeks before the event. Other organisers were unable to run the event and it was cancelled.

== See also ==
- List of electronic music festivals
- Doof
- Rave
