= Spontaneous Illumination =

Studio album by Entheogenic
- Released: November 2003
- Label: C.O.R.N. Recordings

Entheogenic chronology
Entheogenic (2002)	Spontaneous Illumination (2003)	Dialogue of the Speakers (2005)

Spontaneous Illumination was Entheogenic's second and most successful album. It was released in November 2003 for the German label C.O.R.N. Recordings and went to Number 1 on the German Chill-Out Charts, where it remained at number 1 for 8 weeks. Spontaneous Illumination stayed in the Top 10 for an additional 12 weeks.

== Track listing ==
1. "Ground Luminosity" – 11:42
2. "Habitual Overtones" – 8:54
3. "Pagan Dream Machine" – 9:45
4. "Mindless" – 9:41
5. "Invisible Landscapes" – 9:35
6. "Twilight Eyes" – 12:32
7. "Spaced" – 9:47
