= Spirit Zone Records =

Independent record label

Spirit Zone Recordings was an independent record label releasing Goa trance, psychedelic trance, progressive trance and ambient music. Founded in 1994 by Wolfgang Ahrens (a.k.a. DJ Antaro), the label has been defunct since July 2005.

Some of the artists that started their careers and released their albums on the label are Electric Universe, Space Tribe, Shiva Chandra, Etnica, and S.U.N. Project. Spirit Zone also released music by Ololiuqui, Star Sounds Orchestra, Patchwork, Gabriel Le Mar, Ooze, Mekkanikka, Necton and many others.

Spirit Zone was also famous with its series of Global Psychedelic Trance compilations that included tracks by the label's artists and other famous names from the international psychedelic trance scene. All releases in the series, except for the first one, were double-CD packs, with the first CD containing dance music and the second CD containing ambient music.

Plusquam Records was a sub-label of Spirit Zone Records formed by Wolfgang Ahrens (a.k.a. DJ Antaro). It was established to release other music styles that did not fit into Spirit Zone's music concept, such as minimal techno and downtempo music.

== See also ==
- List of record labels
