= GMS (duo) =

Dutch music duo

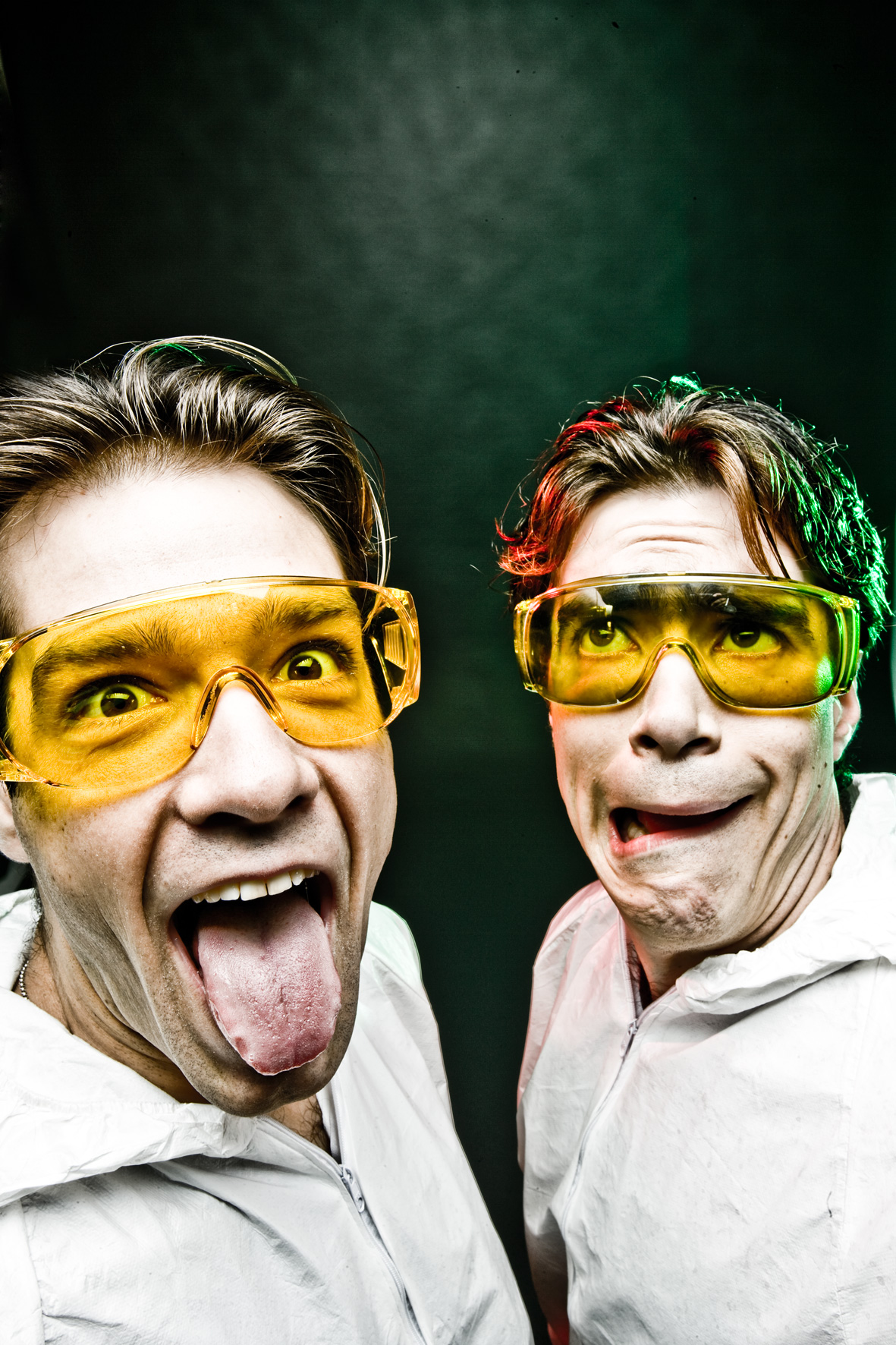

Background information
- Origin: Amsterdam, Netherlands
- Genres: Psychedelic trance Electronica
- Years active: 1995–ongoing
- Labels: Starbox, Spun Records, TIP World
- Members: Riktam (Shajahan Matkin)
- Past members: Sebastion Claro; Yakov (Jacob Biton); Bansi Quinteros
- Website: www.gms-music.com

GMS (also known as the Growling Mad Scientists) are a Dutch psychedelic trance duo which have attained significant popularity, beginning in the early 1990s. Formed by Shajahan Matkin (also known as Riktam) and Joseph Quinteros (also known as Bansi) in the city of Amsterdam, located in the west of The Netherlands, the duo has attracted a large international fanbase. GMS founded Spun Records in 1999, the first psychedelic trance label in the United States and Ibiza, Spain.

In 2008, GMS left Spun Records to further concentrate on their own careers and had created in 2009 a new label to release all of their music from their own various bands called Starbox Music.

They have sold over 350,000 copies worldwide. Director Tony Scott used GMS tracks in his films Man on Fire, Domino and Unstoppable.

GMS won the Psy-Trance award twice (in 2001 and 2009) at the DJ Awards in Ibiza, Spain.

== Members ==
=== Riktam ===
Shajahan Matkin (Riktam) was born in 1976 in Amsterdam, Netherlands. He met his co-member Bansi in a coffee shop when he was 14 years old. When he was 15, he left school and went to India where he travelled to Goa to experience his first trance parties. After returning to Amsterdam in 1995 from another trip to India, he started making music with his friend Bansi. They created a group called the Growling Mad Scientists (or GMS, as it became known). Now he lives in Ibiza, Spain and DJs and produces live shows around the world at various functions.

=== Bansi ===
Joseph Quinteros (Bansi) was born in Barcelona in 1976. He played the drums for six years, starting at the age of 11. He also played bass and guitar, since his father was a musician. At 14, he met Riktam and, after going to Goa together, they founded GMS. He also lived in Ibiza and toured the world on a constant basis. He died on 19 June 2018 at the age of 42 from blood cancer.

== Discography ==
=== Albums ===
Studio albums

- Chaos Laboratory (1997)
- The Growly Family (1998)
- GMS vs Systembusters (1999)
- Tri-Ball University (2000)
- The Hitz (2000)
- No Rules (2002)
- Emergency Broadcast System (2005)
- The G.M.S. Experiment (2021)

Remix albums

- Top of The TIPs 94-98 (TIP Records, 1998)
- The Remixes (Spun, 2003)
- The Remixes Vol2 (Starbox, 2009)
- Tampered Diversity (Future Music Records, 2018)

Compilation albums

- Genetic Process (Spun, 2002)
- Genetic Process "Part Dose" (Spun, 2002)
- Spunout (Spun, 2003)
- Pressure (Spun, 2003)
- Zero-1 (Spun, 2003)
- Hypernova (Spun, 2004)
- XXL (Spun, 2004)
- Remote Viewing (Spun, 2005)
- Zero Gravity (Spun, 2005)
- The Outer Limits (Spun, 2005)
- Spunout in Ibiza (Spun, 2007)

Remixes

- Major7 & Vini Vici - "Back Underground" (GMS Remix)

== Recognitions ==
=== Awards ===
Ibiza DJ Awards

- 2001 Best International DJ Psychedelic Trance
- 2009 Best International DJ Psychedelic Trance
