= Jílovice (Hradec Králové District) =

- Municipality
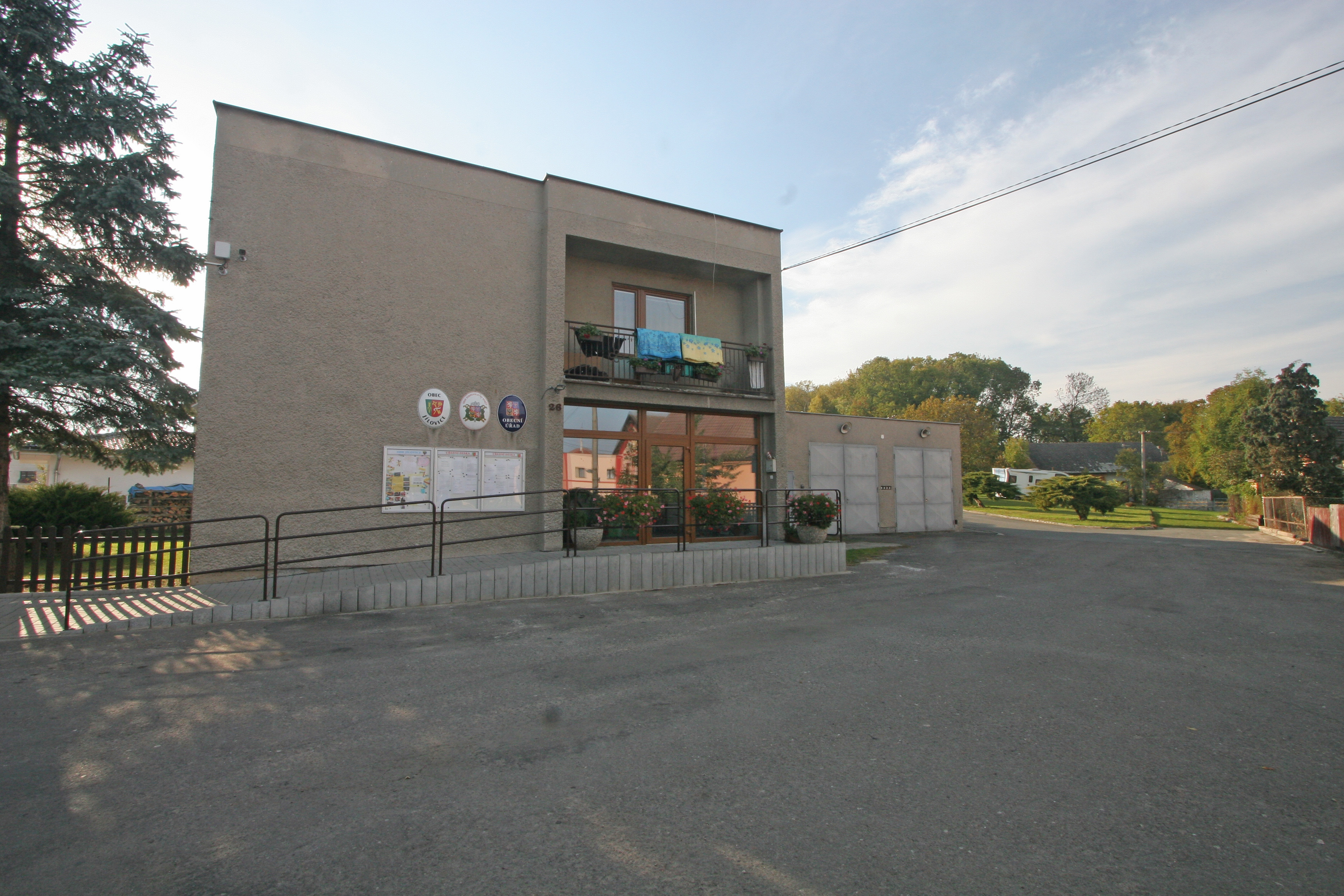
- Municipal office

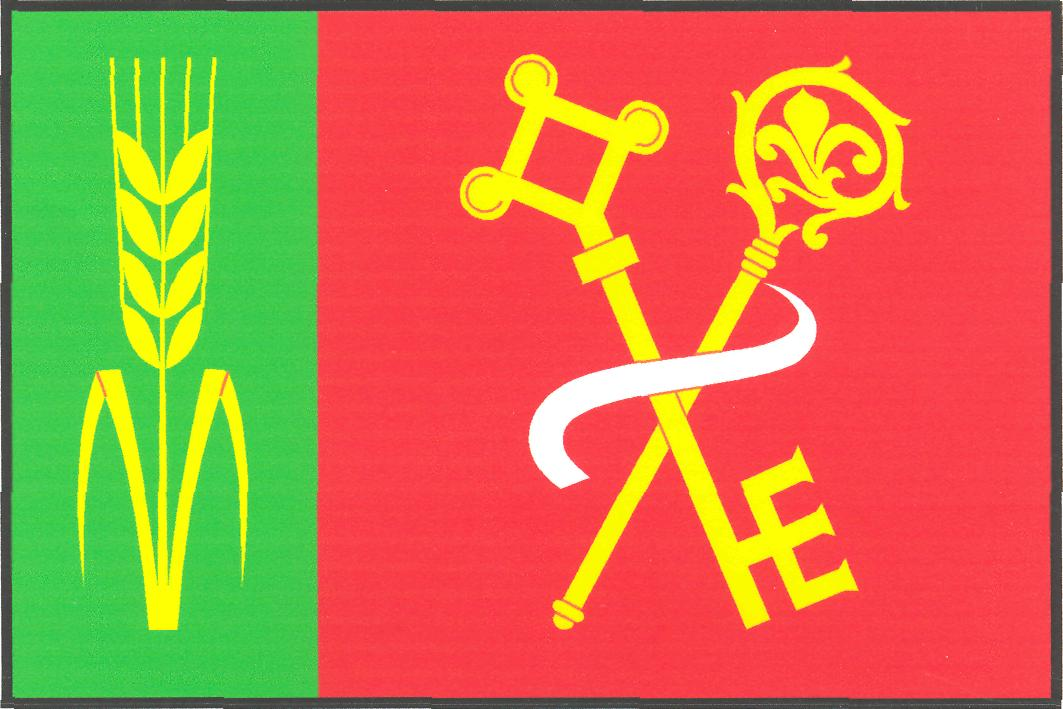
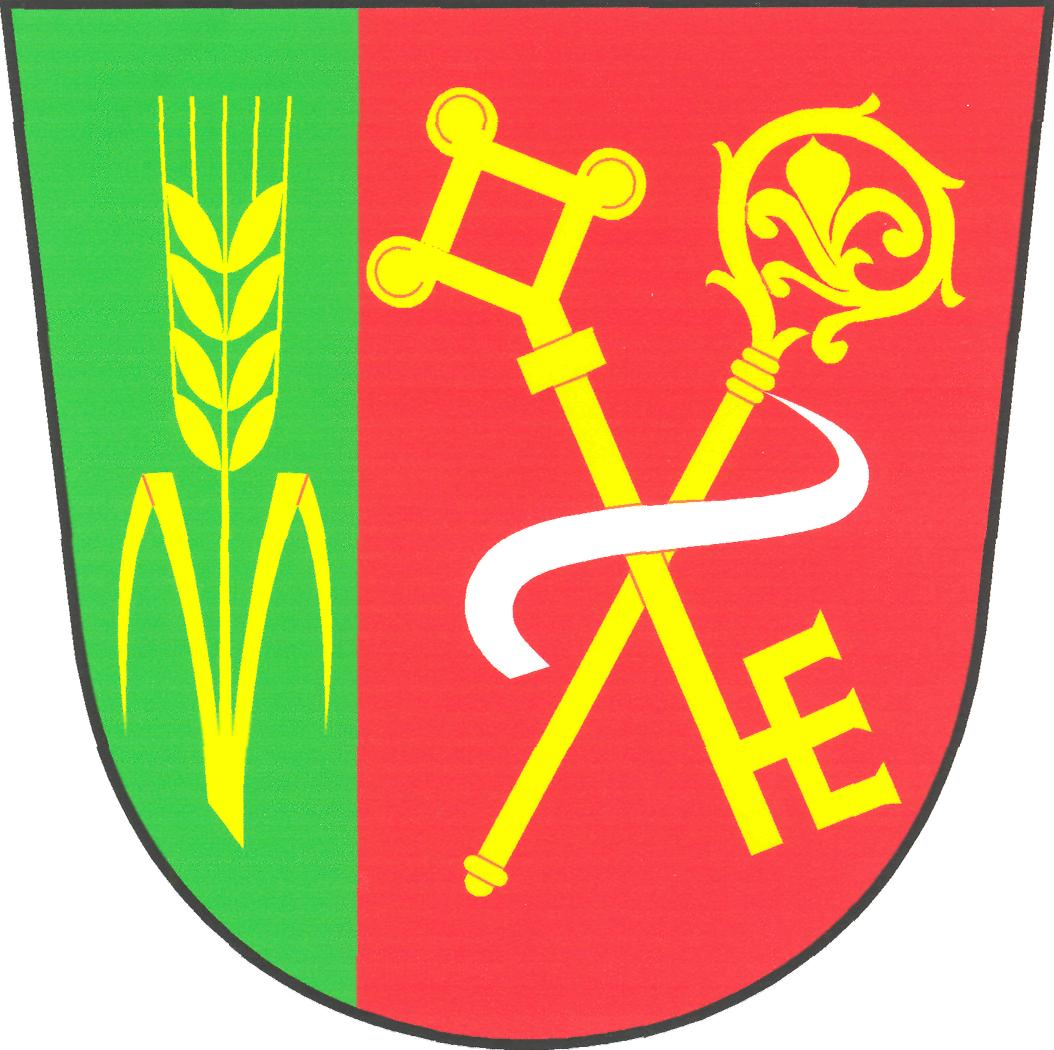
- Flag Coat of arms

- Location in the Czech Republic
- Coordinates: 50°15′2″N 16°0′46″E
- Country: Czech Republic
- Region: Hradec Králové
- District: Hradec Králové
- First mentioned: 1458

Area
  - Total: 3.65 km^{2} (1.41 sq mi)
- Elevation: 271 m (889 ft)

Population (2026-01-01)
  - Total: 308
  - Density: 84.4/km^{2} (219/sq mi)
- Time zone: UTC+1 (CET)
  - Summer (DST): UTC+2 (CEST)
- Postal code: 517 72
- Website: obec-jilovice.cz

Jílovice is a municipality and village in Hradec Králové District in the Hradec Králové Region of the Czech Republic. It has about 300 inhabitants.

== Demographics ==
Historical population
Year	Pop.	±%
1869	452	—
1880	524	+15.9%
1890	505	−3.6%
1900	479	−5.1%
1910	493	+2.9%
1921	445	−9.7%
1930	429	−3.6%
1950	326	−24.0%
1961	300	−8.0%
1970	300	+0.0%
1980	253	−15.7%
1991	242	−4.3%
2001	250	+3.3%
2011	311	+24.4%
2021	320	+2.9%
Source: Censuses
