= Teknival =

Free parties taking place for several days

Teknivals (a portmanteau of the words tekno and festival) are large free parties which take place for several days. They take place most often in Europe and are often illegal under various national or regional laws. They vary in size from dozens to thousands of people, depending on factors such as accessibility, reputation, weather, and law enforcement. The parties often take place in venues far away from residential areas such as squatted warehouses, empty military bases, beaches, forests or fields. The teknival phenomenon is a grassroots movement which has grown out of the rave, punk, reggae sound system and UK traveller scenes and spawned an entire subculture. Summer is the usual season for teknivals.

== History ==
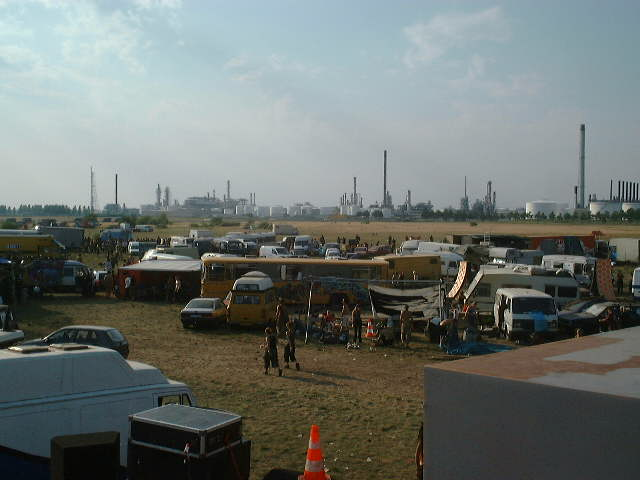
Dutch teknival, August 2001

Teknivals are a larger scale version of free parties and emerged in the early 1990s, when acid house parties and travellers in Great Britain became the target of political repression, culminating in the Criminal Justice and Public Order Act 1994. Section 63 of the Act gave the police new powers to close down illegal parties.

Sound systems then started travelling to countries in Europe where laws were less restrictive and the authorities were uncertain how to stop the festivals. One of the most famous of these sound systems was Spiral Tribe, which was at the forefront of the free party movement in Europe. Other systems were called Bedlam, Circus Normal, Circus Warp and Vox Populi. Desert Storm sound system organised teknivals in France and Spain and brought raves to war-torn Sarajevo, Bosnia, in 1996. At one party the front-line was 10 kilometres away and they were asked to turn off their lights in case they attracted enemy fire.

While some teknivals are one-off events, most take place every year on or around the same date; the biggest, such as the ones in France or Czech Republic, can attract up to 100,000 visitors (2003, France). Just as the word 'teknival' was formed by merging the words 'tekno' and 'festival', teknivals in different countries are referred to by abbreviated names, such as the aforementioned Czechtek, Frenchtek (North France) and also Poltek (Poland), Slovtek (Slovakia), Southtek (South Germany), Bulgariatek (Bulgaria), Rotek (Romania) Helltek (Greece, Hellas in Greek), AlbaniaTek (Albania), Dutchtek (Netherlands), Easttek (East Germany), U-Tek (Ukraine), Northtek (Canada) and Occitek (Occitania, South France). NorthTek was held on Crown Land in Ontario.

== Features ==
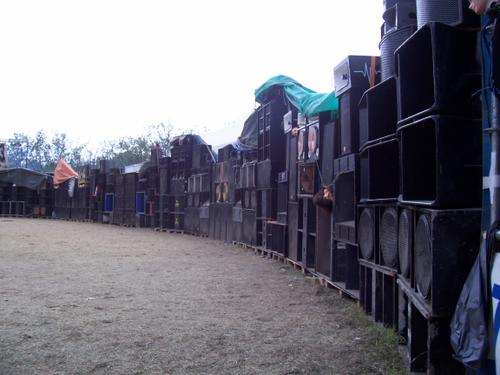
SummerTek 2007

=== Music ===
Since a teknival can last a week or longer, many musical styles will be represented. The music which grew in tandem with teknivals was free tekno, which is characterised by heavy, repetitive kick drums and is normally about 180 bpm. The DJs and party goers are unconcerned by musical boundaries, so a lot of different, mostly electronic, music is played and performed. Most sound systems play styles such as acid techno, hardcore, frenchcore, electro, techno, jungle music, raggacore, skullstep, neurofunk, breakcore, schranz and speedcore. Instead of focusing on genre, the music can be characterised by being more underground than the music heard in clubs and at commercial parties, although some sound systems might specialise in a certain subgenre. The music is played by DJs playing vinyl records and Mp3 files on a computer. Livesets are also frequently played using a variety of equipment: keyboards, drum machines, guitar effects pedals, MIDI controller and computers. At early teknivals, sound systems would play until either no-one was left dancing or the diesel ran out in the generator.

=== Subculture ===
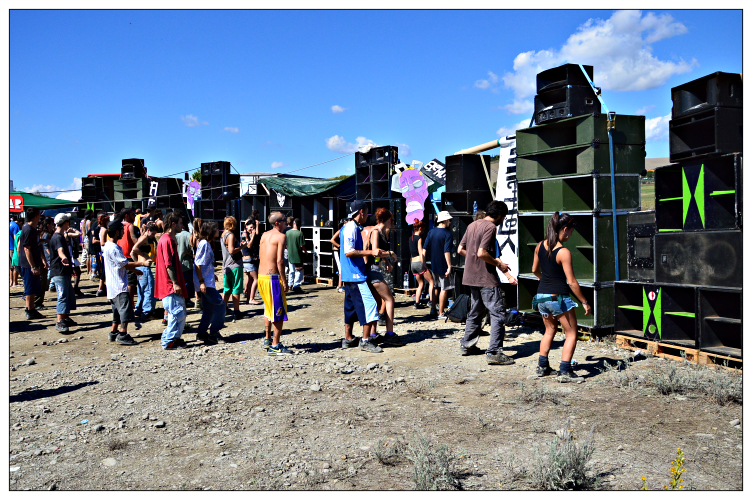
2014 teknival in Italy

Anyone is welcome to enter the site, there is no ticket or fee. Normally any artist who turns up is encouraged to participate. Over the course of a few days, the site can grow into a village of sound systems, cafes, tents and vehicles. The teknival is often regarded as an example of what Hakim Bey has termed the Temporary Autonomous Zone, though in interviews Bey has professed that rave culture's interest in technology remains problematic for the implementation of the TAZ. However this has not stopped various groups from claiming the teknival and rave culture in general as the implementation of the TAZ. French ravers reached out to José Bové to make a political alliance but were rebuffed.

At the teknival site one finds a mixed group of young people which may include students, tekno travellers, squatters and hippies, bonded together by their love for listening to free tekno 'sous les etoiles' (translation: 'under the stars') - as an early flyer proclaimed. It is usually the perception that there is no "coherent" politics or philosophical stance represented by the teknival subculture, mainly due to the fact that emphasis is placed on individual freedom. Many young teknival goers are disillusioned with mainstream politics. Nevertheless, the parties themselves require complex collective organisation and, in order to be successful, a sustainable environment of community relations. In themselves such events can be seen as a political statement of self-organisation at a distance from the State. Clashes with the police have mobilised some people to action against laws which would prohibit self-organisation and gathering to enjoy teknivals. These clashes date back to the 1980s (when teknivals were arguably indistinguishable from UK Orbital raves, summer acid house parties, UK traveller gatherings, Stonehenge pagan events, early tribal gatherings, trance parties in Goa, India and the like) and have continued to be part of teknival life. In April 2006 there was a march followed by a small teknival in Strasbourg, France to protest against police repression generally and more specifically against the closure of Czechtek in 2005. During the implementation of the Criminal Justice Act in the UK, various large-scale protests took place during daylight and in public. The Reclaim the Streets and Carnivals Against Capital of the 1990s that led up to and beyond the Seattle WTO protests (and subsequent "anti-globalization" events) drew from teknival and rave organisation and culture, often involving many of the same organisers and cross-section of the population.

As occurs with many subcultures, a dress code has developed. This 'underground look' involves dark, baggy clothing (often ex-military) and extreme haircuts, such as dyed hair, dreadlocks or a shaved head (or a combination of the above). Body piercings and tattoos are common. People often buy large vehicles second-hand such as decommissioned buses, coaches or trucks. The vehicles are often primarily homes, lived in permanently or for a few months while travelling. They are also used to transport sound equipment. The tekno traveller is generally known as a mix between a New Age traveller and a crust punk.

=== Organization ===
Sound systems gather on the site and play varied types of electronic music. Along with each sound system come friends and travellers so most teknivals have a multicultural atmosphere. The parties can last for several days or even weeks. Teknivals are organised by the sound system community using underground methods such as word of mouth, answerphone messages, flyer (pamphlet) and internet discussion boards. Normally the flyer states that the party is an open invitation, thus any artist who turns up can play music. The emphasis is on a DIY ethic. As well as local sound systems, who might act as the hosts, larger sound systems can spend the summer travelling from one teknival to the next before returning to their home country for the winter.

Despite public perceptions, drug deaths at parties are rare. Two people died at a teknival at Marigny-le-Grand in Marne in 2005, one from a cocktail of alcohol and drugs, the other from an allergic reaction to a caterpillar.

== Teknivals by region ==
=== French teknivals ===
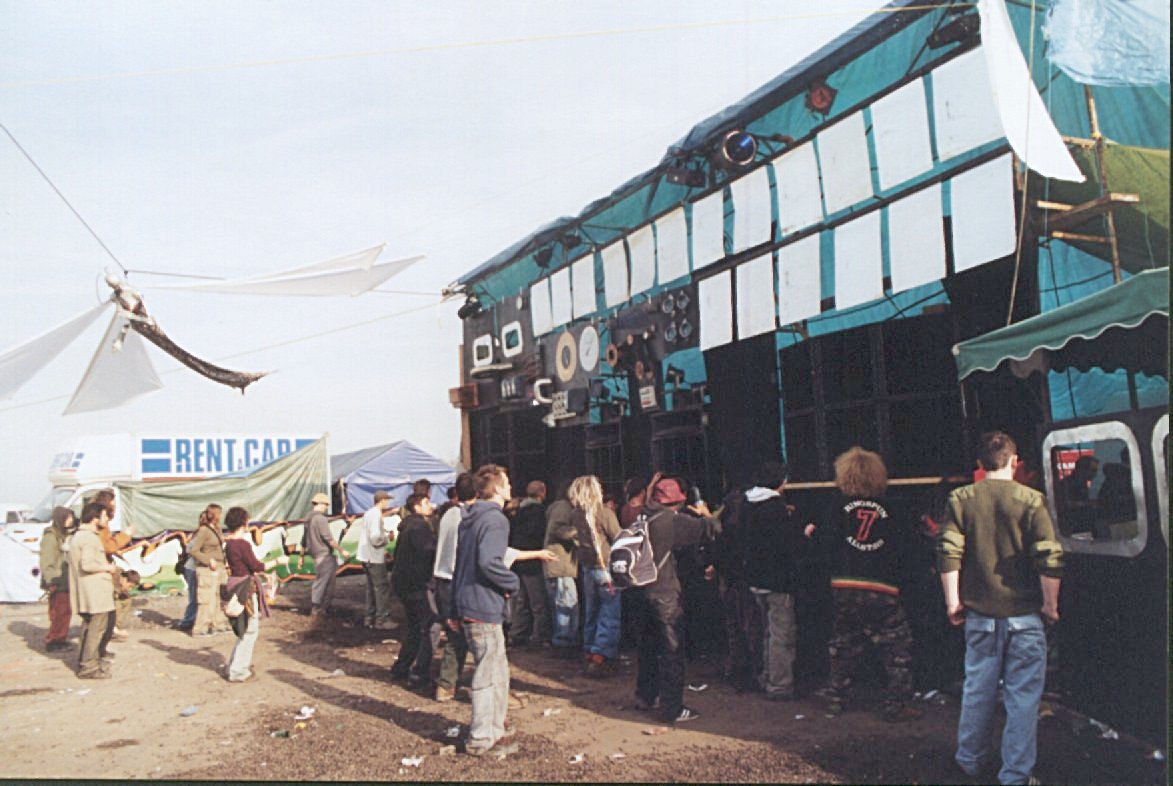
Paris Teknival, May 2005

In France teknivals began in 1993. The May Day teknival at Fontainebleau near Paris was attracting 60-80,000 people by the late 1990s and in 2004 over 110,000 with over 200 sound systems. Eventual amendments to the public safety laws, the Loi sur la Securité Quotidienne, were passed in 2002 (known as the "Mariani Law" named after politician Thierry Mariani) in which free parties became linked with terrorism. Like the UK’s Criminal Justice Act, this effectively criminalized large free festivals and increased police powers to prevent these events. Legitimate teknivals, now dubbed "Sarkovals" after Nicolas Sarkozy (formerly the Minister of the Interior and President) would require permission from the Ministry. However, while regulatory interventions have inaugurated the institutionalization and commercialization of a scene rooted in an autonomous vibe, the parties continued. A legal party near Chambéry drew 80,000 ravers. Sound systems were occasionally seized at illegal parties, for example at Bouafles in 2009 and Saint-Martin-de-Crau in 2011.

Currently French law permits free parties with 500 people or under (subject to no noise complaints), and while Prefets generally refuse the applications now required for free parties with over 500 people, through constant negotiations with the Ministry of Interior since the August 2002 teknival on the French/Italian frontier at Col de l’Arches where sound crews set up rigs inside the Italian border facing the party goers in France, the French Government have reluctantly allowed up to three large teknivals each year, even though they are technically unauthorized events. Teknivals also take place outside legal festivals such as Printemps de Bourges, Transmusicales in Rennes or Borealis in Montpellier. Teknival negotiators deal directly with the Ministry of Interior, not the Ministry of Culture (with whom the commercial ventures seeking official status must deal) indicating that they are largely not cultural but security concerns.

In May 2019, unexpectedly cold weather affected a teknival attended by 10,000 people in the Creuse department in central France. Thirty people were treated for hypothermia as the temperature dropped to −3 °C (27 °F; 270 K).

=== UK teknivals ===
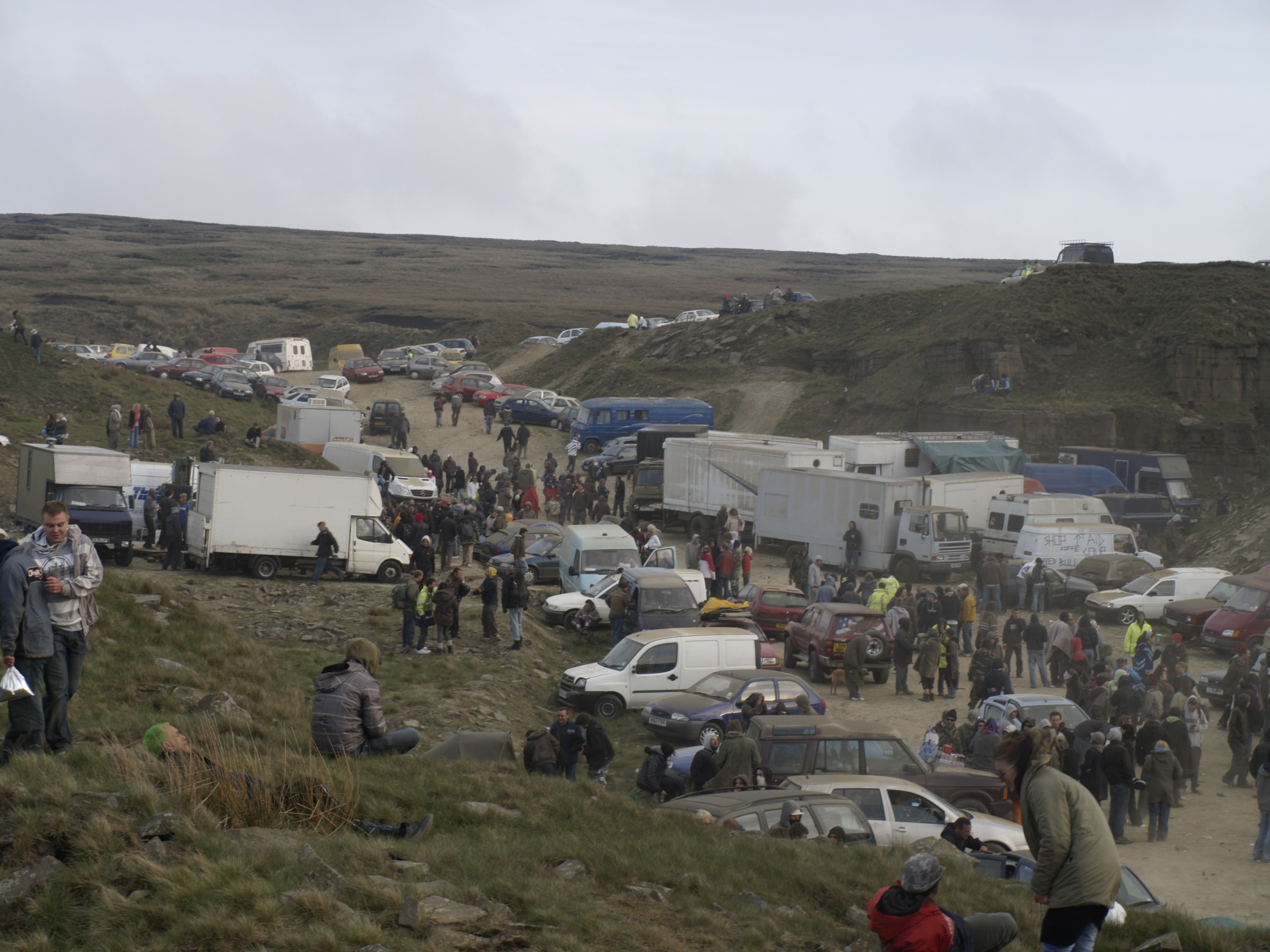
UK Tek 2008

In 2002, the tenth anniversary of the legendary Castlemorton rave was celebrated at Steart Beach, where around 16,000 people turned up over the course of the weekend. In 2005, there was a UK Tek in Wales and also a teknival known as Scumtek that happened twice in London. The first Scumtek was stopped by the police. However a further four events have taken place under the Scumtek name, three of which were squats with teknival rig numbers, and Scumtek 3 which took place in the centre of London Docklands in April 2010 outside and inside with 23 rigs in attendance.

2006 saw a teknival occur in Camelford, Cornwall at Davidstow abandoned airfield. Approximately 2,500 people attended and it was eventually clamped down on by the police three days after it began. UK Tek 2008 took place in a moorland quarry above Rochdale in north Manchester resulting in a significant police response, including attacking ravers with batons. Dog units, mounted police, and police in full riot gear attended. The UK Tek in 2009 took place on a remote hillside near Brecon, Wales at an abandoned pub called The Drovers Arms, that is used by the MOD as a training location. In 2010 UK Tek was at Dale Aerodrome in Pembrokeshire, Wales again with approximately 2,500 attendees and police forced most people off site by the Sunday. In 2015 it took place in Lincolnshire at an old airfield that had been used in the past for raves. Police closed down soundsystems one by one, until the remaining system had the majority of ravers around it, and resisted Police lines and forced them to back down. 2017 UK Tek took place in Wales near Sennybridge, Brecon.

In May 2018, a UK Tek was organised near to the Welsh town of Brechfa in Carmarthenshire. The rave started at midnight on Saturday with the music not finishing until late Monday evening. Approximately 4,000 people were in attendance. South Wales Police were aware of the rave, but did not have the resources available to disperse such a large crowd of people. A police helicopter was used throughout the bank holiday weekend to monitor the actions on the ground. Late on Tuesday evening, rave attendees were still seen at the location cleaning up the majority of litter left behind.

In April 2022, an Easter Teknival took place in East Lulworth, Dorset. News sources claim that over 1000 revellers were in attendance over the 21 hour duration of the party.

=== Czech teknivals ===
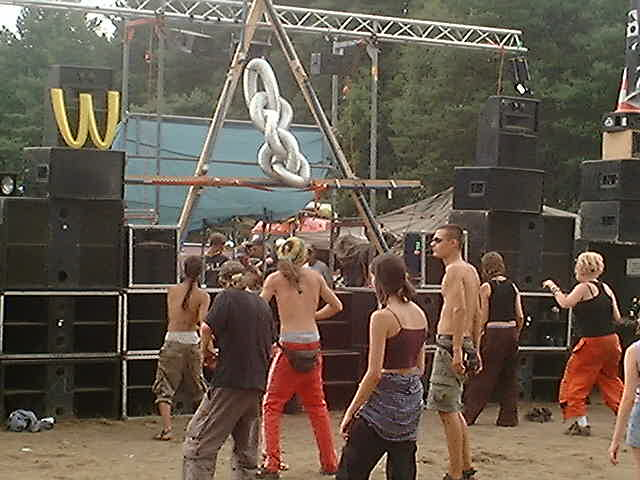
CzechTek 2001

In the Czech Republic, Czechtek was held annually from 1994. In 2005, police and 5,000 party-goers clashed resulting in 30 injured ravers and 50 injured police officers. There is also Czarotek (held annually in spring). When Czechtek has been discontinued after the event at Hradiště Military Area in 2006, more smaller open free parties are held through all the year. Czech travellers like Circus Alien, Strahov or Vosa continued to spread the vibe to various countries across Europe such as Bulgaria (from 2003), Romania, Spain, Poland or Ukraine (from 2006).

=== Bulgarian teknivals ===
Bulgariatek began in 2003 and takes place annually in early August, usually somewhere on the Black Sea coast.

The first noise complaint occurred in 2017 in Shkoprilovtsi and made the local authorities surprisingly notice that a teknival had been taking place on the beach every year for the last ten years.

== See also ==
- List of electronic music festivals
- Doof
