= Etnica =

Italian Goa trance band

Etnica was a Goa trance project from Milan, Italy. It was formed by Carlo Paterno, Max Lanfranconi, Maurizio Begotti, and Andrea Rizzo.

== 1993–1998 ==
Max Lanfranconi was a co-producer on an independent Italian label Time Out and had released two singles in the mid-80's. Max was also member of the 'Tribe' group and by 1988 he began organizing 'Dance all Night' parties in Italy. Dance All Night parties became very famous, the first official parties in Italy to last till the morning lights. Encouraged by the success Max decided to start producing and around in 1992 he met Andrea Rizzo and they started to make music together. Meanwhile, around the same time Maurizio Begotti and Carlo Paterno had started making music elsewhere. In 1993 they all met a record shop and decided to produce music together and Etnica was born. Andrea had a solid classical music background that combined with the melodies of Carlo and Maurizio's sense of arrangement would soon lead to the production of some of the most classic Goa trance tracks.

Their first EP was published on Brainstorm Records in 1994, and was entitled The EP. Their first album, The Juggeling Alchemists Under The Black Light, was out in 1995 on the German label High Society. This helped the band to build a solid reputation in the psychedelic trance scene. Their second album, the classic Alien Protein, was released in 1996 on Blue Room Released.

The band, beside producing music as Etnica, had the idea of creating a party-oriented side project and after some thoughts the name Pleiadians was forged. Starting off with an EP on Symbiosis Records in 1995, they have produced with the original band members two albums, Identified Flying Object (1997) and Family of Light (1999) in which Carlo was partially involved. Their first album, I.F.O., was started by Carlo during August '96 and was then finalized with the other band members in September '96, but released only a year after on Dragonfly Records.

They had another side project, Crop Circles, that was a collaboration with another Italian band, Lotus Omega, and with that project they released 2 singles, "Full Mental Jackpot" and "Lunar Civilization", both released in 1997 on Auracle Recordings, and also finalized an album in 1998, Tetrahedron, that was finally released only in 2008 on DAT Records.

== 1998–present ==
In 1998 the band moved its studios to Ibiza where the project would be carried on by Max and Maurizio only. After the writing of their third full-length album Equator (1999), Andrea left the band as well. Since 1999 the band has changed their sound to be up to the modern standards of production, following the worldwide trends and trying to achieve a more mature sound, after successfully proving that they could realize some of the best Goa trance tracks ever.

Their fourth album, Nitrox (2001), is the result of this evolution and worked really well on the dance-floors at the time of release. The following album, Chrome (2002), displayed a further development in sound production and clarity and was so successful that they released two versions, one for Europe and one for Japan. Their sixth Etnica album Sharp (2004) was liked by old time fans too as it featured a return of melodies, like they did in the past times, but still showed a crystal clear and professional production. In 2006 a seventh album was released, Totemism, featuring all their best hits remixed by the most famous psytrance producers of the millennium. This one was highly acclaimed by fans worldwide.

The Pleiadians project was relaunched in 2006 with the release of a third opus, an album called 7even Sister7, that delivered many sci-fi oriented tracks, released on Harmonia Records.

Etnica are still very active in the scene and weekly performing DJ and Live sets all around the world.

== Discography ==
=== EPs ===
Etnica

- The EP (Brainstorm 1994)
- The Italian EP (Spirit Zone Records 1995)
- Tribute (Blue Room Released 1995)
- Kumba Mela (Matsuri Productions 1995)
- Starship 101 (Blue Room Released 1996)
- Plastic (Blue Room Released 1997)
- Polar (Spirit Zone Records 1999)
- Andromeda (Spirit Zone Records 2000)
- Hell's Kitchen (MDMT Records 2000)
- B Sirius (Spirit Zone Records 2002)
- Tracktor Activity (Etnicanet Records 2002)
- 2012 EP (Neurobiotic Records 2012)

Pleiadians

- Pleiadians (Symbiosis Records 1995)
- Sonic System (Symbiosis Records 1996)
- Zeta Reticuli (Flying Rhino Records 1996)
- Accidental Occidentalism Sampler (Symbiosis Records 1996)
- Alcyone Picture EP (Dragonfly Records 1997)
- Headspin (Dragonfly Records 1998)
- Starseed EP (Etnicanet Records 2012)

Crop Circles

- Full Mental Jackpot (Auracle Recordings 1997)
- Lunar Civilization (Auracle Recordings 1997)

=== Albums ===
Etnica

- The Juggeling Alchemists Under The Black Light (High Society Records 1995)
- Alien Protein (Blue Room Released 1996)
- Equator (Spirit Zone Records 1999)
- Nitrox (Spirit Zone Records 2001)
- Chrome (Solstice Music 2002)
- Chrome (Western Edition) (Etnicanet Records 2002)
- Sharp (Solstice Music 2004)
- Totemism - Etnica Remixed 1996-2006 (Etnicanet Records 2007)
- The Juggeling Alchemist Under The Black Light (DAT Records 2018)

- Remaster of Etnica's first Release. Including never released early demos and test tracks.

Pleiadians

- Identified Flying Object (Dragonfly Records 1997)
- Family of Light (Dragonfly Records 1999)
- Seven Sisters (Harmonia Records 2006)

Crop Circles

- Tetrahedron (DAT Records 2008)
