= Jílovice (České Budějovice District) =

- Municipality
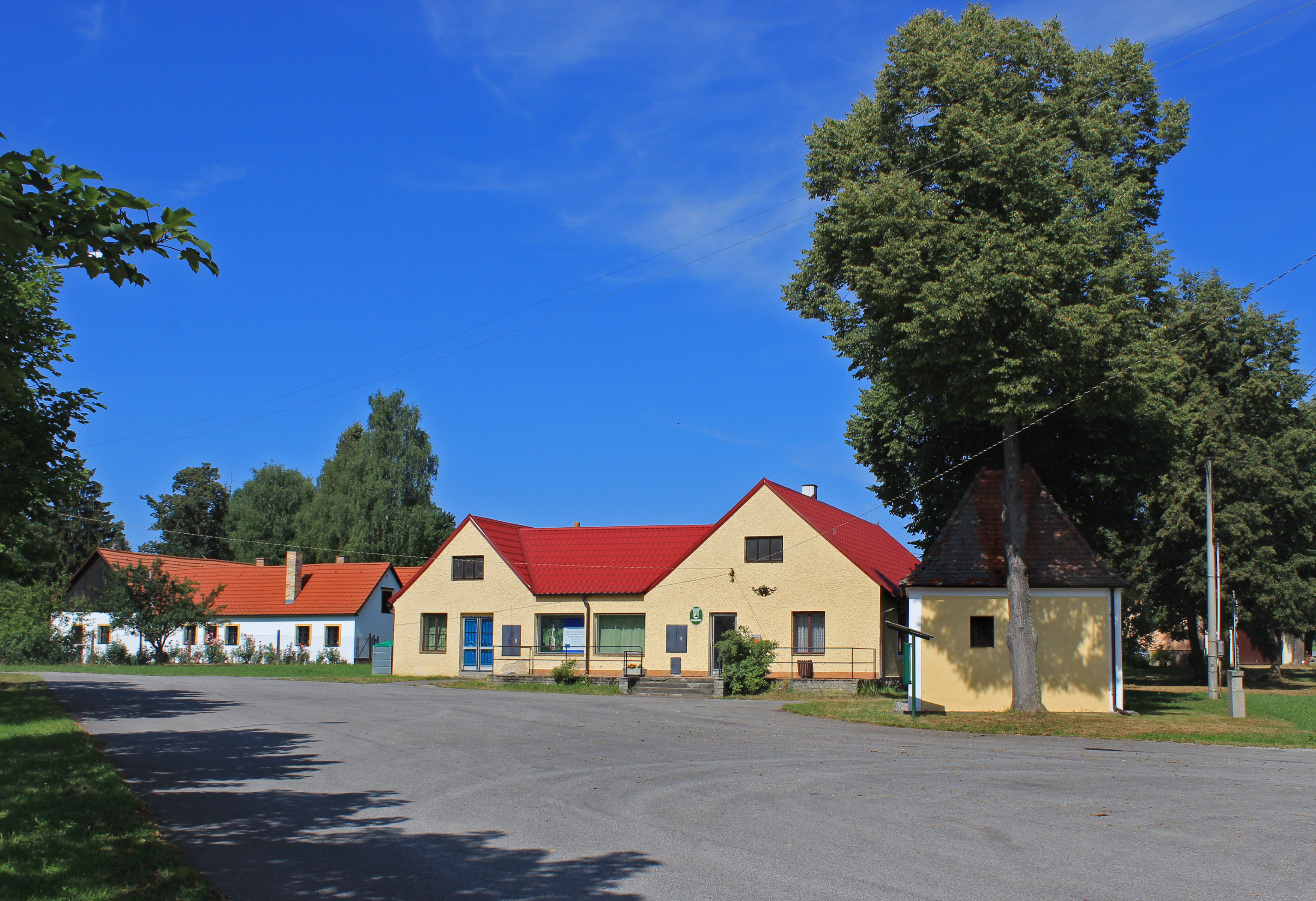
- Centre of Lipnice, a part of Jílovice

- Flag Coat of arms

- Location in the Czech Republic
- Coordinates: 48°53′22″N 14°43′36″E
- Country: Czech Republic
- Region: South Bohemian
- District: České Budějovice
- First mentioned: 1366

Area
  - Total: 44.33 km^{2} (17.12 sq mi)
- Elevation: 494 m (1,621 ft)

Population (2026-01-01)
  - Total: 1,120
  - Density: 25.3/km^{2} (65.4/sq mi)
- Time zone: UTC+1 (CET)
  - Summer (DST): UTC+2 (CEST)
- Postal code: 373 32
- Website: www.obecjilovice.cz

Jílovice is a municipality and village in České Budějovice District in the South Bohemian Region of the Czech Republic. It has about 1,100 inhabitants.

Jílovice lies approximately 21 kilometres (13 mi) south-east of České Budějovice and 135 km (84 mi) south of Prague.

== Administrative division ==
Jílovice consists of eight municipal parts (in brackets population according to the 2021 census):

- Jílovice (558)
- Jiterní Ves (11)
- Kojákovice (157)
- Kramolín (43)
- Lipnice (95)
- Nepomuk (29)
- Šalmanovice (111)
- Vlachnovice (23)

== Demographics ==
Historical population
Year	Pop.	±%
1869	2,304	—
1880	2,204	−4.3%
1890	2,337	+6.0%
1900	2,493	+6.7%
1910	2,634	+5.7%
1921	2,299	−12.7%
1930	2,180	−5.2%
1950	1,588	−27.2%
1961	1,550	−2.4%
1970	1,324	−14.6%
1980	1,047	−20.9%
1991	901	−13.9%
2001	842	−6.5%
2011	933	+10.8%
2021	1,027	+10.1%
Source: Censuses
