= Sound system (DJ) =

DJ and audio engineer collective

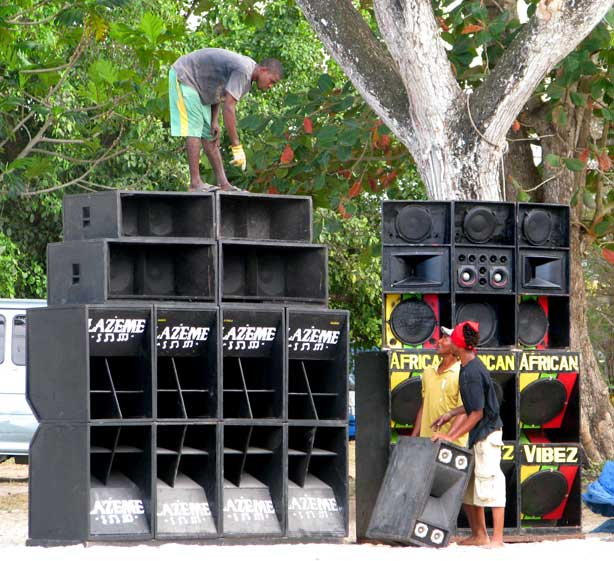
Audio technicians set up massive speaker enclosures for a Jamaican sound system party.

A sound system is a group of DJs and audio engineers contributing and working together as one, playing and producing music over a large PA system or sound reinforcement system, typically for a dance event or party.

== Origin ==
The sound system concept originated in the 1950s in Kingston, Jamaica. DJs would load up a truck with a generator, turntables, and huge speakers to set up street parties. The sound system scene is a part of Jamaican cultural history and responsible for the rise of modern Jamaican musical styles such as ska, rocksteady, reggae and dub. When Jamaicans emigrated to the United Kingdom, the sound system culture followed and became firmly rooted there in the 1970s. It is still strongly linked with those Jamaican-originated music genres, and some bands or producers still call themselves sound systems, such as Dub Narcotic Sound System and the On-U Sound System. When Asian Dub Foundation are advertised as Asian Dub Foundation, the whole band performs, but when they announce themselves as Asian Dub Foundation Sound System, members of the band mix and play music (by other artists, as well as their own) while one or two MCs rap over the songs. The term also has become connected with sound reinforcement systems by DJs.

== Free party ==
The term "sound system" is also used to refer to a free party sound system, also known as a rig. The equipment includes a van, loudspeakers, amplifiers, turntable decks and cables. Larger rigs might also have a fog machine, stage lighting, video projectors and an electrical generator; the generator enables the sound system to be set up anywhere. A sound system collective is usually five or more people, with larger sound systems having more members. Equipment is owned by some and others are DJs, record producers or enthusiastic ravers who help out. They will be the people who organise free parties and teknivals and will be a group of friends with similar interests. Some owners purposely use second hand equipment, to reduce their risk if the equipment is stolen or damaged. This type of rig is called a "suicide rig" and usually used at insecure locations where it may get stolen or damaged and if it is suspected that police will have knowledge of the party.

Sometimes a sound system collective is well known for its wide travels. This type of collective can be described as modern nomad tribes or new age travellers. In this context the word sound system is used interchangeably to describe either the group of people or the equipment. The techno travelling scene of the 1990s was made of sound system crews like Bedlam sound system and Spiral Tribe. The free party community has been criticized for the unkempt appearance of attendees to such events, accusations of substance abuse of illegal drugs such as MDMA, ketamine, amphetamines and LSD, and complaints about messes left behind by such parties have given the scene a negative reputation. However, despite such complaints, the scene continues to grow with a large following in Bristol, Abergavenny, Newport, London, Devon and Cornwall.

== See also ==
- Dub music
- Free party
- Free tekno
- Rave
- Reggae
- Rocksteady
- Ska
- Sound clash
- Sound system (Jamaican)
- Teknival
