= Electric Universe =

German musical group

Electric Universe is a psychedelic trance project from Germany formed by Boris Blenn and Michael Dressler in 1991. Their first EP release, Solar Energy, was an instant hit with the underground trance scene and is often credited with putting the Spirit Zone Recordings label at the forefront of psychedelic trance early on. According to The Sofia Echo, they were "hailed in the 1990s as one of the top psychedelic trance projects to come out of Germany".

== History ==
The Electric Universe project was founded in 1991 by Boris Blenn and Michael Dressler in Hamburg, Germany. After being inspired by the first big Voov Experience in Sprötze, the first Psy Trance oriented tracks were produced, with just 5 pieces of equipment. These were two synthesizers, one sampler, a mixing desk, and an Atari 1040STE. Some of the tracks found their way into the hands of DJ Antaro, who had just started his record label Spirit Zone. He liked the stuff and decided to release the Electric Universe Solar Energy maxi single as the second release on his label. It turned out to be a big hit and set the ground for the first album, One Love, in 1994.

More and more trance parties were taking place and Electric Universe started to give concerts, at first, mainly in Germany, and then later, all around the globe. In 1997, Dressler decided to leave the project and Boris went on alone. It was the year of the Star Diver album, with the massive track Online Information, that blew the dancefloors everywhere and came to be a blueprint for breakbeat trance. In 1999, Roland Wedig joined Electric Universe and the result of the first cooperation was the track "Meteor" on the Blue Planet album. This kicking track, with its expressive guitar lines was played at many psychedelic parties for over a year. Often during live performances, Electric Universe will be accompanied by their stage guitarist, Roland, who accompanies the band in tracks that feature the electric guitar.

As well as the Electric Universe project, Blenn is successfully working on several side projects such as Jupiter 8000 on Nova Tekk/Liquid Audio and the chill project Galaxy on Blue Room as well as Gabon3 with its first release in the form of the album Source Of Silence in 2003 on Medial Music/Silenzio. Many collaborations have been happening in the last few years with artists such as DJ Sangeet, S.U.N. Project, GMS, and Olli Wisdom (Space Tribe).

== Discography ==
- One Love (Spirit Zone Records 1995)
- Stardiver (Spirit Zone Records 1997)
- Waves (Spirit Zone Records 1998)
- Blue Planet (Spirit Zone Records 1999)
- Blue Planet (Avatar Records 1999)
- Divine Design (Spirit Zone Records 2000)
- Unify (Spirit Zone Records 2002)
- Cosmic Experience (Spirit Zone Records 2004)
- Silence In Action (Planet B.E.N. Records 2006)
- Space Phenomenon (Space Tribe vs Electric Universe) (Space Tribe Music 2006)
- Sensory Overload (Space Tribe vs Electric Universe) (Space Tribe Music 2007)
- Burning (feat. Chico) (Electric Universe Records 2008)
- Sonic Ecstasy (Electric Universe Records 2008)
- Higher Modes (Electric Universe Records 2011)
- Journeys Into Outer Space (Dacru Records 2014)
- Nebula (Dacru Records 2015)
- Sacred Geometry (Sacred Technology 2022)
