= Free tekno =

Subgenre of hardtechno

Free tekno, also known as tekno, freetekno and hardtek, is the music predominantly played at free parties in Europe. The spelling tekno is deliberately used to differentiate the musical style from techno. The music is fast and it can vary between 150 and 185 bpm and is characterised by a pounding repetitive kick drum. Nevertheless, bass drum distortion by clipping is used less often as in the related genre of mainstyle hardcore. Nowadays, some tekno producers also use drum samples/sounds that rather sound trancey, since many members of the tekno subculture as well as the psytrance subculture frequently attend the same raves and the two scenes are closely connected.

== History ==
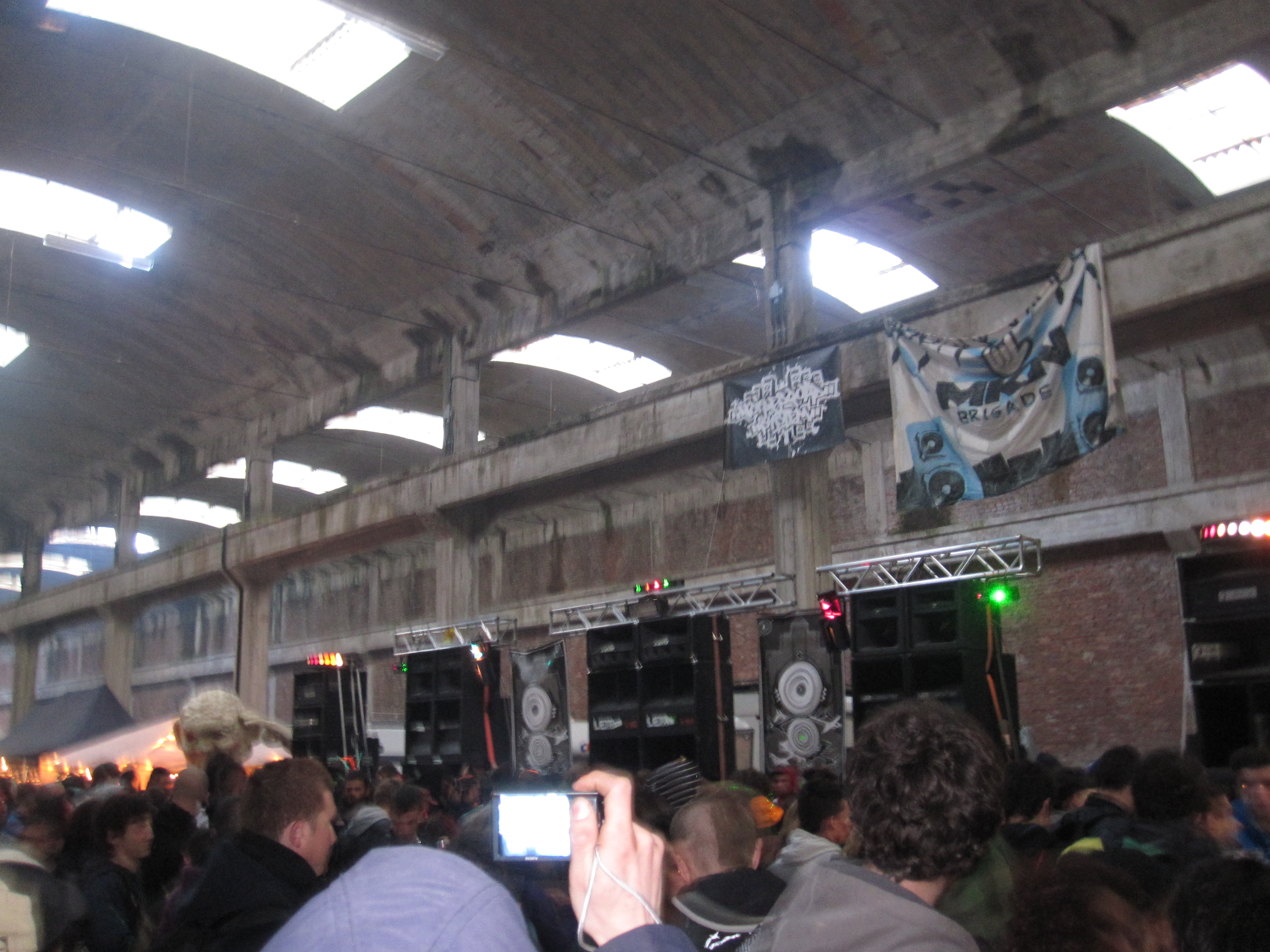
Freetekno party

Tekno evolved in tandem with the teknival movement in the early 1990s since many of the teknival organisers and DJs were also making music. At first the music took off from acid house and then drew on influences such as hardcore, jungle, early hardcore and techno, with the producers taking the sound in a darker direction. Spiral Tribe was the first to start making and widely disseminating this genre, taking it to France and Eastern Europe after the Criminal Justice act was implemented in the UK. An emphasis is placed on samples from TV shows, films and popular culture which are placed at strategic moments in the tracks. The music was produced with whatever was available: drum machines, synthesisers and keyboards as well as computer programs such as audio/MIDI sequencers and Trackers, sometimes even hitting a random table with a pen. Starting from year 2001 there has been a trend using laptop and laptops for live performances, because the capabilities of both the hardware and software were improving very quickly. Many artists, however, still use hardware for live performance and create a unique track at every freeparty. The sounds are lot simpler making them sound more oldschool and easier to dance to. The main genre that is still played with hardware, is tribe, a relatively underground subgenre of tekno.

With the evolution of the genre it has come to be known by a number of names, including spiral tekno, hardtek, tribetek, tribe and lately evolved in many other subgenres like pumping tek, hardfloor and Frenchcore which is a sort of mixture between mainstream hardcore and hardtekno, with funny and pumping samples taken from different media sources.

Artists within this genre usually follow a very different ideology when compared to more modern and mainstream producers:

- Artists often use many pseudonyms, as they are not interested in mainstream success or recognition
- Most are not interested in profit
- They also support the free distribution of their works, as they do not see it as their own material, but as something that belongs to the fans and the community

This is described as "returning to the roots".

== Other genres ==
Tekk/tekke is mainly produced in Germany and often remixes quotes or audio clips and represents a commercial part of electronic music. Therefore the tekno and tekkno scenes are not connected. As dance music, tekkno was unusually rhythm-oriented for the time. Therefore, this term also became synonymous with particularly hard dance music. At times, the number of the letter "k" was used to advertise the supposed hardness of the sound at parties and compilations (Tekno, Tekkno, Tekkkno...). A similar variant appeared shortly afterwards with the emergence of the freetekno[de] scene. The overall sound of tekk can be described as "dumb" or "asozial/assi", due to its heavy and monotone kicks with repeating vocals. Artists include Die Gebrüder Brett, Zahni, Nogge, Crotekk, Minupren and Craig Mortalis.
