= Free party =

Party "free" from the restrictions of the legal club scene

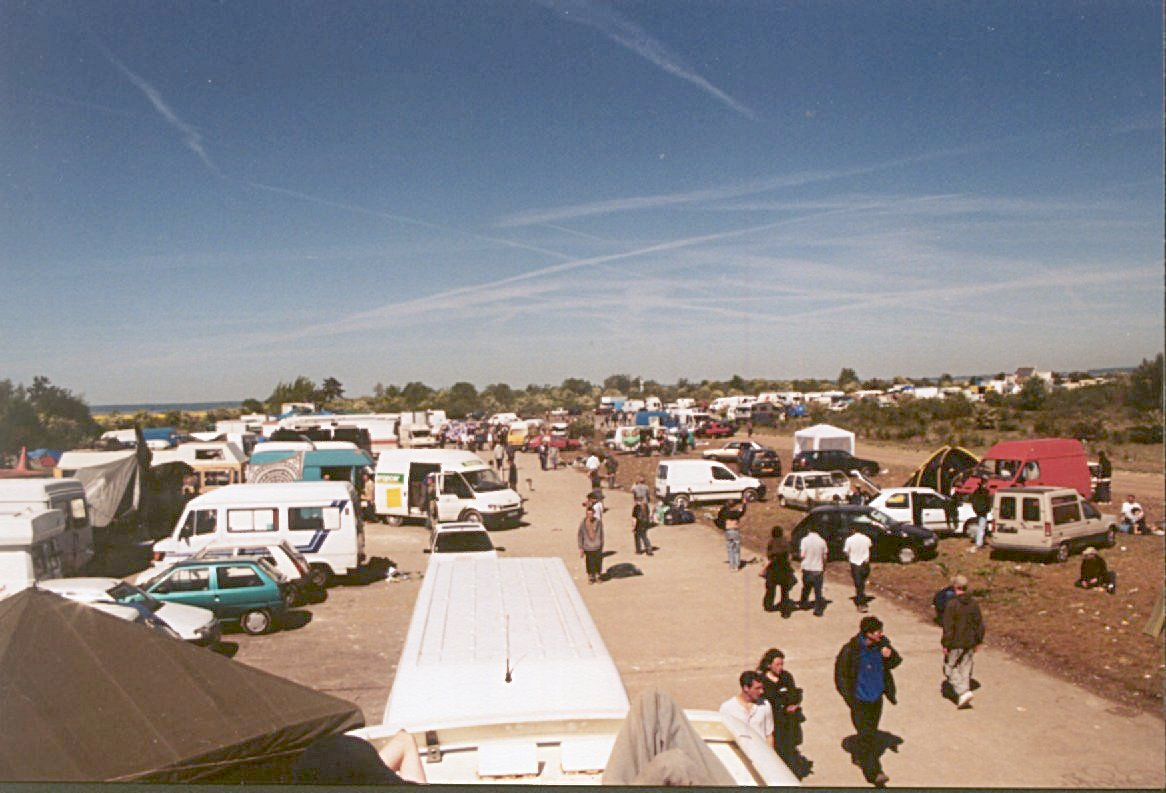
A free party in 2003

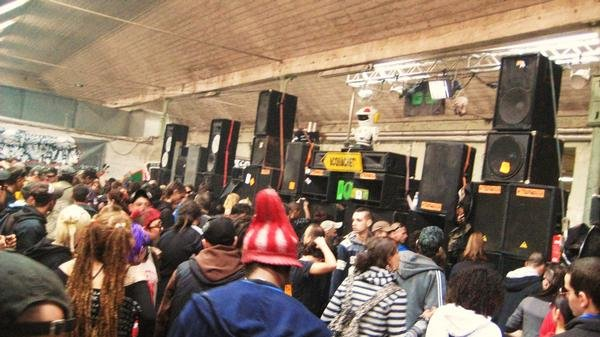
Pasquatek 2009

A free party is a party "free" from the restrictions of the legal club scene, similar to the free festival movement. It typically involves a sound system playing electronic dance music from late at night until the time when the organisers decide to go home. A free party may be multiple sound systems. If the party becomes a festival, it becomes a teknival. Free in this context describes the entry fee and the lack of restrictions and law enforcement.

Organiser motivations range from political protest to simple recreation. An example of free parties as political protest was their prominence during the M11 link road protest. At most parties no money is asked for entrance since profit is not the aim. Some (often indoor) events request donations at the door to cover costs. Typically organisers make little profit or a loss setting them up. The term free party is used more widely in Europe than in the US. In Canada and some European countries, these events are also known as Freetekno parties. A free party might have once been described as a rave, and the origins of the two are similar. Since the birth of nightclubs in town centres in Europe the term rave had largely fallen out of fashion; however there has been a recent resurgence.

Squat parties are free parties with secret indoor locations. The address is obtained on the day of the event personally from organizers as the buildings are squatted. These parties often last more than 24 hours.

== History ==
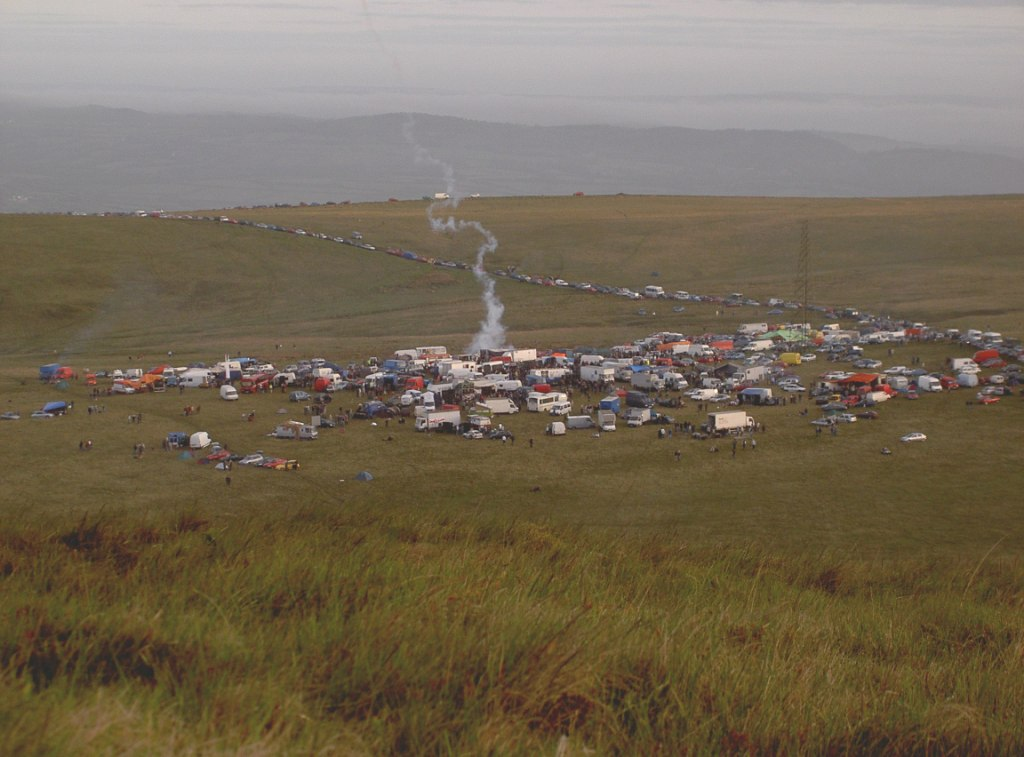
May 2005, UK Tek a large outdoor free party in Wales

After the emergence of Acid House parties in the late 1980s, raves of up to 4,000 attendees were known. These events happened almost every weekend. The noise and disturbance of thousands of people appearing at parties in rural locations, such as Genesis '88, caused outrage in the national media. The British government made the fine for holding an illegal party £20,000 and six months in prison.

Police crackdowns on these parties drove the scene into the countryside. These weekend parties occurred at various locations outside the M25 Orbital motorway and attracted up to 25 000. Sound systems from this time include Spiral Tribe and DiY.

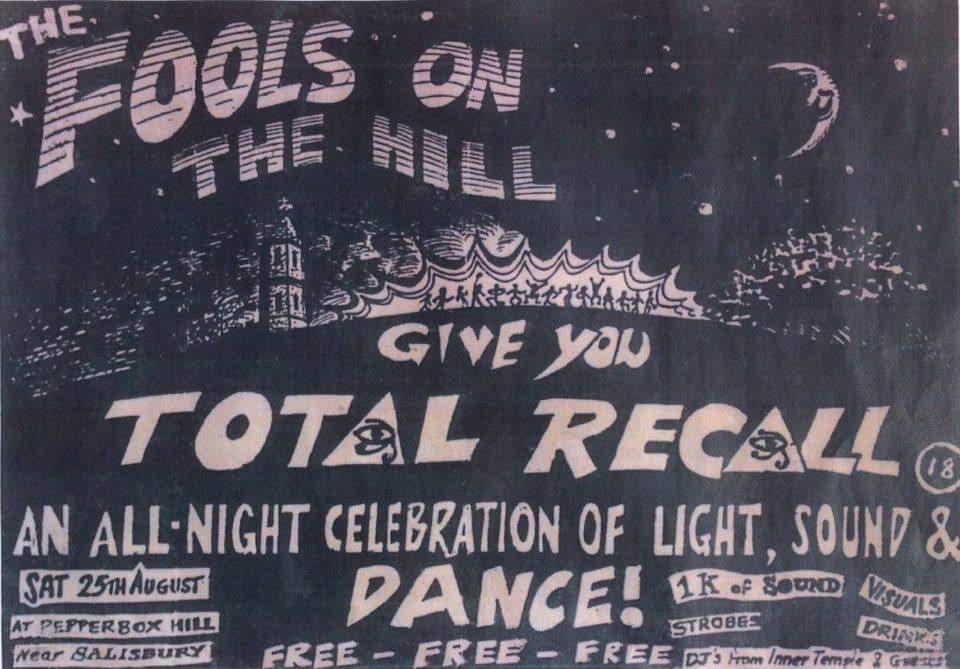
The flyer advertising the Total Recall free party on Pepperbox Hill, 25 August 1990. Original artwork by David Stooke.

In August and September 1990 a series of unlicensed free parties took place on Pepperbox Hill, outside Salisbury, in South Wiltshire. The parties were organised by a loose collective of new age travellers, squatters and anarchists based in the Salisbury area. They used different pseudonyms, including Inner Temple, The Fools On The Hill and The Leyline Lunatics, but ultimately became known as the People From Pepperbox or PFP. Initially small affairs, the parties grew during August as word spread to clubbers in Bournemouth and Southampton. By the end of August, people were attending from across the UK. The final party on Pepperbox Hill was held on 1 September 1990. The Wiltshire Constabulary closed the site to public access the following weekend. The People From Pepperbox went on to organise three subsequent events in 1990, at Barton Stacey airfield in Hampshire, a disused RAF airbase at Sopley in Dorset, and a squatted former pub in Salisbury, deploying guerilla tactics to stay ahead of police and ensure parties remained undetected until they were too large for authorities to stop. On 13 April 1991 one further PFP party was held at a new age travellers' site at Pitton, near Salisbury. The party ended in violence, and led to parliamentary debate discussing new age traveller sites. The Pepperbox free parties are regarded as being the first to combine raves and free festivals, creating the free party. DJs at these pioneering events included Pepperbox organisers DJ Oli and DJ ETC, Bournemouth DJs Justin Harris and Nigel Casey (known as North and South), and latterly, Simon DK and DJ Jack from Nottingham's DiY soundsystem.

In the 1990s legal raves began to expand into a global phenomenon. Around 1989-1992 people who had travelled to attend the first raves began setting up regional promotion companies to organize their own parties. This happened on a grassroots basis. By the mid-1990s, major corporations were sponsoring events and adopting the scene's music and fashion for their advertising.

After sensational coverage in tabloids, culminating in a particularly large rave (near Castlemorton) in May 1992, the government acted on what was depicted as a growing menace. In 1994, the United Kingdom passed the Criminal Justice and Public Order Act 1994, containing sections designed to suppress the growing free party and anti-road protest movements (sometimes embodied by ravers and travellers). This led to the expansion of the movement mainly due to the Spiral Tribe collective, who fled the UK after the Castlemorton rave. Fleeing fines from the British government, they went to France, where they organized the first major festival outside the United Kingdom: Frenchtek, which is still held illegally every year.

By the early 2000s, the term "rave" had fallen out of favour among some in the electronic dance music community, particularly in Europe; although "rave" is still often used in North America to describe EDM events. The Freetekno movement is not as present in North America, except some parts of Quebec. Many Europeans identify themselves as "clubbers" rather than ravers. The term 'free party' has been used for some time and can be seen on the Spiral Tribe video 'Forward the Revolution' in 1992. It tried to disconnect raves from big commercial events of the early nineties to a more anarchist version of a party.

Some communities preferred the term "festival", while others simply referred to "parties". With less constrictive laws allowing raves to continue after the United Kingdom banned them, more anarchic raves continue to occur in Central Europe and France, where law permits only 4 teknivals per year (2 in the south, 2 in the north). In France the larger teknivals can attract up to 30 000 people in a three-day period. The terms free party and squat party have become the predominant terms used to describe an illegal party.

Free parties tend to be on the boundaries of law and are discouraged by government authorities, occasionally using aggressive police tactics.

Liza 'N' Eliaz was considered a "spiritual leader" in the free party movement in France.

== Typical party ==
Free parties are much like other rave parties, with distinctions of free expression, no restrictions, and often free of charge. These events are often held in isolated outdoor venues or abandoned buildings. These locations are away from authorities' attention and avoid public disturbance.

Often free parties and squat parties involve psychoactive drug use. The music played at free parties is very bass heavy. It is for this reason that they are usually held in isolated venues or places where police interference is unlikely, such as protected squatting residences (particularly in the UK).

Dance music with fast repetitive beats is typical. Each sound system has its own music policy, following and entourage. Popular genres include breakcore, gabba, psy-trance, freetekno, Acid Tekno, Hard Trance and Electro House/Techno, Drum & Bass/Jungle, Hardtek, Tribe, Tribecore and Tekstep. Some parties, now incorporate elements of performance art ("synthetic circus") as well as electronic dance music.

Ignoring licensing restrictions, these parties often start after midnight and continue until morning, often longer. Some parties last several days and large teknivals such as may last a week.

Squat parties may have an overt or implied radical left-wing stance. The squat party community embraces autonomous, anarchistic principles, refusing to recognize the right of outside authorities to decide when and how people should congregate. Squat party organizers often eschew capitalistic values by putting on parties which benefit the community and its artists instead of profit.

Occasionally, squat parties act as ad-hoc information points where political pamphlets are distributed or petitions signed to raise awareness about (usually left-wing) causes. London's Reclaim the Streets movement brought traffic and commerce to a standstill once a year to draw public attention to inner city problems, and was a highly visible and politicized affiliate of the U.K. squat party scene.

Squat parties are events held in squatted venues/occupied properties usually without restrictions allowing people to express themselves freely, just like a free party with the difference that a squat parties are held in unused/abandoned buildings mostly happening in the winter and autumn, when its mostly cold to hold parties outdoors.

== Law and police ==
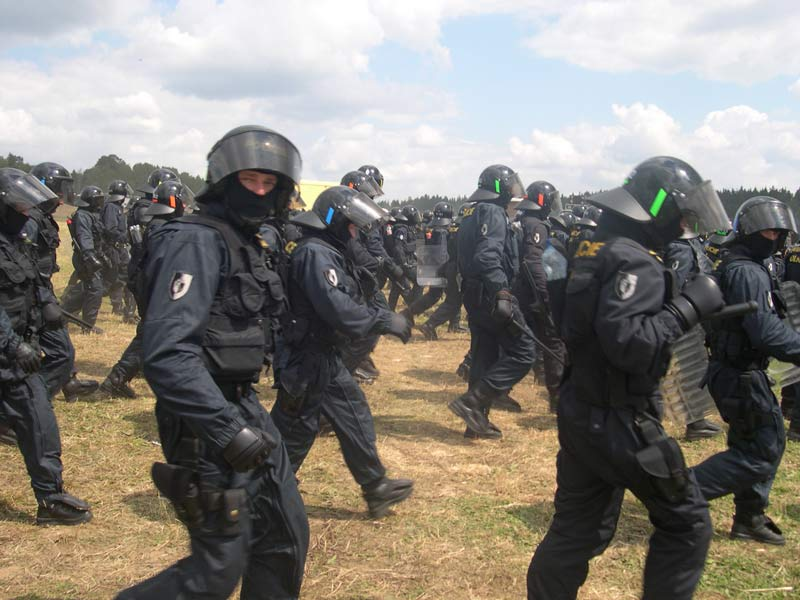
Police out in force at CzechTek 2004

=== UK ===
Under the Criminal Justice and Public Order Act 1994 the definition of music played at a rave was given as:

"music" includes sounds wholly or predominantly characterised by the emission of a succession of repetitive beats.

— Criminal Justice and Public Order Act 1994

Sections 63, 64 & 65 of the Act targeted electronic dance music played at raves. The Criminal Justice and Public Order Act empowered police to stop an open-air rave during any period of time when a hundred or more people are attending, or where two or more preparing a rave. Section 65 allows any uniformed constable within five miles of a rave and believing a person is on their way to a rave to stop them and direct them away; non-compliant citizens may receive a maximum fine up to level 3 on the standard scale (£1000). The Act was ostensibly introduced because of noise and disruption night parties cause to nearby residents, and to protect the countryside. It has also been claimed that it was introduced to kill a popular youth movement that was taking many drinkers out of town centres drinking taxable alcohol and into fields to take untaxed drugs.

The number of people attending and organising such an event for it to be deemed illegal were altered in the Anti-Social Behaviour Act 2003 section 58 to cover indoor parties and outdoor parties of more than 20 people. It is also a crime to prepare to attend a rave within 24 hours of being told by a police officer to leave a rave.

More recently in the United Kingdom, anti-social behaviour orders (ASBOs) have been used against unlicensed rave organisers if the police receive repeated complaints about noise and littering from locals.

Despite these laws, free parties continue, employing tactics to avoid disruption. They can be small (fewer than 100 people) and remote so that they are unlikely to distress local residents. If the police learn about the party and turn up, it is rarely worth police resources attempting to arrest people and seize equipment. Rave attendees would have to leave without time to tidy up and potentially incapable of driving safely. Free parties may also be large enough to make breaking them up difficult. Groups of 500 or more creates potential for a riot if interrupted. A typical justification for allowing a rave to continue is: "officers had decided not to stop the rave because they had only received one complaint about noise and the amount of resources needed to stop it would not be justified."

In August 2006, an unlicensed party organised by united sounds – Aztek, LowKey, One Love, Mission, Illicit, Monolith & Brains-Kan Sound Systems in Essex, England was broken up after 24 hours resulting in approx. 60 injuries from both sides and over 50 arrests. This was one of the largest confrontations between police and unlicensed ravers for many years. The Chief Superintendent in charge of the operation said "These sorts of raves are quite unheard of in this county - I have not seen this sort of violence since the old days of acid house."

== Squat party ==
A squat party is a party that takes place either in a disused building (where entry is obtained and the building secured for the party) or in an already existing squat / occupied building.

Squat parties are usually advertised either by word of mouth, internet bulletin boards, WhatsApp, Telegram, flyers handed out at other similar events, and through phone lines set up by organizers or the sound system(s) planning the event. This is for security reasons, since organizers do not want the authorities finding out about them and trying to stop them. Other events might be much smaller acoustic nights run more like a café. Squatted buildings are often used as social centres and creative spaces.

Most squat parties run for 12 to 24 hours, finishing when the organizers have had enough or when shut down by police. Most large cities in the UK have a squat party scene, with London considered the most active location in the country. Most London squat parties occur in industrial estates or disused warehouses which make ideal venues and a smaller chance of residential noise complaints. The London squat party scene of has recently seen an influx of foreigners, becoming events with attendees from all around the planet. Usually regular attendees bring new attendees, spreading the word.

Squat parties have grown in recent decades after the closure of many London night clubs. These closures have been forced by laws and restrictions since 2007.

These events often feature police presence, usually on the event and people's safety. Despite most of free parties being unlicensed, they are often allowed to continue while people are safe. Closing these events can risk the safety of party goers and the general public, but they will usually be closed if people are in danger.

Squat 'eviction' parties occur when the squatters residing in a building have been given a final date for their eviction, and organize a large party and protest to resist eviction.

== Drugs ==
Drugs sale and use is long standing, most commonly MDMA (ecstasy), amphetamine, cocaine, LSD, psilocybin mushrooms, cannabis, 2CB, nitrous oxide, and ketamine. Drugs are easily available at almost all free parties and people often use stimulants to reduce fatigue from hours of dancing, and for the recreational effects. Psychedelics are often used to achieve altered states, especially in psytrance festivals.

In early years MDMA was the most common party drug; however ketamine had been increasingly popular in Europe, most noticeably in the London scene, where ketamine has a massive presence. In 2000 ketamine use was mostly isolated to free parties but by 2005 was commonly found in mainstream clubs.

In many free-parties, the organisers will have some sort of risk-reduction in place. Often offering earplugs, nose and eye drops, condoms and paper straws for sniffing. This mitigates the damage of risky behaviours, reducing issues like Hepatitis or deafness. Some events have a crisis tent for people in need, who may have overdosed or are tired from dancing for extended periods of time.

== Security ==
Due to the drug culture and unregulated environment, security is a problem for many party organisers. Some free party sound systems hire private security at events to keep the crowd safe, but they are not always present.

Parties often rely on self-policing and control established by attendees. Police are rarely an option for dealing with troublemakers so sometimes the music is stopped and the offenders are told to leave.

== Locations ==
Typical parties in the London scene range from small parties of a few hundred people up to huge multi-riggers involving a thousand or more people. The number of sound systems involved also varies – small parties may have just one or two sound systems, larger parties may have anything up to 20 or more, including several "link-ups" where two or more sound systems will combine their rigs into a single large system.

Although London is the central location for squat parties, they exist outside the capital in places such as the Three Counties, Bedfordshire, Hertfordshire & Cambridgeshire as well asBuckinghamshire; all have popular scenes dating pre 1995. Modern parties are usually hosted in Bedford, Norfolk, or London; but Cambridgeshire, Northampton and Suffolk still have a contemporary underground scene, along with Derbyshire, South Yorkshire and South Wales. Outdoor parties are popular all over Wales and the South West and can attract up to a thousand people. Outdoor parties are organised so that noise pollution is not a factor. If the local residents complain then the party is much more at risk of being stopped. In most big cities there is an underground counterculture centred around free parties which are predominantly outdoor parties in the summer and squat parties when it is too cold. Most organisers will try to secure a warehouse, if not they will look for a wooded area to hide themselves and try and soften the music and enjoy the outdoor environment as well as to avoid being discovered by the authorities.

== List of free parties ==
The following is an incomplete list of notable free parties:

- Castlemorton Common Festival
- CzechTek
- KaZantip
- Love Parade
- Street Parade
- Fuckparade

== See also ==
- Freetekno
- Teknival
- Rave party
