= Disconnected (Greymachine album) =

Studio album by Greymachine
- Released: 4 August 2009
- Genre: Industrial metal, sludge metal, post-metal, noise, drone
- Length: 62:27
- Label: Hydra Head
- Producer: Justin Broadrick

Singles from Disconnected
- 1. "Vultures Descend" Released: 12 May 2009

Vinyl reissue cover
- Released in 2018

Disconnected is the debut album by experimental music act Greymachine, featuring Justin Broadrick, Aaron Turner, Dave Cochrane and Diarmuid Dalton. Produced by Broadrick, it was released on 4 August 2009 via Turner's own record label, Hydra Head Records. In February 2018, Disconnected was reissued as a limited 2xLP with unique artwork and clear vinyl.

The track "Vultures Descend" was released as a limited edition promotional single on 12 May 2009.

== Musical style ==
Regarding Disconnected's style, Broadrick said:

Greymachine was influenced by really heavy drum & bass, Whitehouse, noise, Throbbing Gristle, old bands like Drunks With Guns, The Stooges... It's like this mish-mash of stuff, a really cantankerous album. It was funny, when the album came out on Hydra Head it was advertised initially as being a collaboration between Jesu and Isis. A lot of people got really angry because it's not remotely similar to either band. The whole point was for it to be this real monolith of nasty, bloated sounding shit.

According to AllMusic's Phil Freeman, the songs on Disconnected, "most of which run in the eight to nine-minute range, all feature a heavy combination of huge beats, sludgily dissonant guitar riffs, industrial electronics, and raw-throated howls." "Droning soundscapes layered into weighted guitar riffs, feedback and general noise" are also present on the record. These take influence from various genres of experimental music, including noise music, no wave and free jazz. The album is also indebted to its members' earlier work on records, like Godflesh's Streetcleaner, Isis's Celestial, Ice's Under the Skin, and God's The Anatomy of Addiction. Nevertheless, according to Iann Robinson of CraveOnline, the record still retains "a punk rock influence born from The Stooges or The Screamers." Sonic Youth, Sun Ra and Throbbing Gristle were reported to be additional influences and likes.

== Critical reception ==
Professional ratings
Review scores
Source	Rating
AllMusic	4.5/5 stars
About.com	2/5 stars
Ox-Fanzine	4.5/5 stars
Pitchfork	4.3/10

Phil Freeman of AllMusic praised the album, stating, "Disconnected is likely to be a one-off, given the astonishingly busy schedules its members keep, but it's no mere diversion; if you're a fan of Broadrick or Turner, it's one for the permanent collection." Iann Robinson of CraveOnline described the album as "a pure and true testament to real experimentation", while also stating that "[in a] musical world that breeds as much apathetic mediocrity as the current one does a noisy enema like Greymachine's Disconnected is a welcome friend." Cam Lindsay of Exclaim! wrote, "Greymachine's compositions move at a slower rate, bringing the brutality with a doom-filled heaviness that asphyxiates with an impenetrable wall of noise built by scraping riffage and floating effects." Nevertheless, he also stated that "While it shows Broadrick can still find that harsh realm he cut his teeth on, Disconnected doesn't live up to the massive potential Greymachine had on paper."

George Pacecho of About.com expressed his distaste of the album, saying, "Disconnected, the resulting spawn of this much-talked-about collaboration, seems to be of a far less genre-defining nature". Cosmo Lee of Pitchfork criticized the album, stating, "Greymachine wastes the talents of Broadrick and Turner." He also commented that "the album feels like a collection of demos – for a Godflesh remix EP, perhaps, or for Broadrick's earlier beat-oriented projects like Techno Animal or Ice."

== Track listing ==
No.	Title	Length
1.	"Wolf at the Door"	8:08
2.	"Vultures Descend"	9:38
3.	"When Attention Just Isn't Enough"	6:41
4.	"Wasted"	8:43
5.	"We Are All Fucking Liars"	8:35
6.	"Just Breathing"	5:09
7.	"Sweatshop"	6:56
8.	"Easy Pickings"	8:34
Total length:		62:27

Japanese bonus track
No.	Title	Length
9.	"We Are All Fucking Liars" (Version)	8:35
Total length:		71:02

== Personnel ==
Credits adapted from Disconnected liner notes

- Justin Broadrick – drums, electronics, guitar, vocals, programming, mixing, production
- Dave Cochrane – bass
- Diarmuid Dalton – bowed bass, electronics
- Aaron Turner – electronics, guitar, vocals, layout design
