= Laika (band) =

English band

- Origin: London, England
- Genres: Electronic; experimental; post-rock
- Years active: 1993–2003
- Label: Too Pure
- Past members: Margaret Fiedler; Guy Fixsen; John Frenett; Lou Ciccotelli; Louise Elliott; Rob Ellis

Laika were an English band formed in 1993 and helmed by Margaret Fiedler (lead vocals, programming) and Guy Fixsen (guitar, programming). Their lineup also included John Frenett (bass), Lou Ciccotelli (drums), Louise Elliott (flute, saxophone), and Rob Ellis (drums). Laika were founded following Fiedler and Frenett's departure from the band Moonshake; Laika's other members had previously worked with different artists on the roster of Moonshake's label Too Pure. Laika's experimental style blended diverse genres, including electronica, krautrock, dub, hip hop, and jazz. They released their debut album Silver Apples of the Moon in 1994, and followed with 1997's Sounds of the Satellites, both to critical praise. Laika released two subsequent albums, 2000's Good Looking Blues and 2003's Wherever I Am I Am What Is Missing, after which they entered an indefinite hiatus.

== History ==
=== 1993: Formation ===
Margaret Fiedler moved from New York City to London in 1989 in search of music which better suited her interests. The first significant band she joined was Moonshake, in which she was one of two lead vocalists, a songwriter and a multi-instrumentalist predominantly playing guitar, keyboards and samplers. Moonshake's songwriting was split between Fiedler and co-vocalist David Callahan, who had a very different style: Callahan favoured an art-punk storytelling approach with a dub/funk undercurrent while Fiedler preferred a more enveloping and abstract approach drawing on rhythmic krautrock-esque loops and murmured vocals. The early Moonshake records, released on the Too Pure label, were engineered by the producer Guy Fixsen, who had also worked with bands including My Bloody Valentine and The Breeders.

The creative tensions in Moonshake ultimately became personal and the band broke up after a tour of the United States in 1993. While Callahan kept the Moonshake name and continued the band (along with the drummer Mig Morland and various guest musicians), Fiedler and the band's bass guitarist John Frenett both left. Fiedler began working with Guy Fixsen as her writing and recording partner, as well as beginning a romantic relationship with him. The new partnership, with Frenett playing bass guitar, continued to develop the approach Fiedler had taken with her songs in Moonshake. The band named themselves after the Russian dog Laika, the first animal to orbit the Earth.

=== 1994–2000: Active recording and performance ===
In Laika's first incarnation, Fiedler, Fixsen, and Frenett were augmented by the flautist and saxophonist Louise Elliott and the drummer Lou Ciccotelli (God, Eardrum, SLAB!). On recordings and in live shows, Fiedler and Fixsen shared guitar, keyboards and sampling, with Fiedler doing most of the vocals. The group's first album was the acclaimed Silver Apples of the Moon, released on Too Pure in 1994. Shortly afterwards, Rob Ellis (PJ Harvey, Spleen) joined as an occasional second drummer and percussionist.

The band quickly became popular interviewees in the alternative and underground music press, its music praised for mingling intricacy, polish and accessibility with experimentation and originality. In 1995, Fiedler described her band's music as "just like trip-hop, but much much faster" and declared her distaste for the then-current Britpop, citing a preference for jazz and dub. She later recalled that "Guy and I were interested in rhythm but couldn't get excited about 4/4. So, influenced by bands like The Young Gods, we wanted to take rock rhythms and turn them upside down. 7 is great!"

Laika's second album, Sounds of the Satellites, was released in early 1997. Many of the previous album's more abrasive edges were smoothed away in favour of a sleeker, though not much less experimental, dance tone. The group continued to attract a lot of press attention, particularly when they supported Radiohead on tour, and continued to be an underground favourite, despite not having a hit. A third album, Good Looking Blues, was released in 2000. The same year, Fiedler played in PJ Harvey's backing band on an extensive world tour promoting Harvey's album Stories from the City, Stories from the Sea. On this tour, she played guitar, cello and other instruments. In 2003, Laika released a collection of singles, B-sides, and rarities entitled Lost in Space: Volume 1 (1993–2002).

=== 2003: Final recordings and hiatus ===
Up until 2003, each Laika release had been a full band recording involving, at the very least, Elliott and Frenett as players. This changed in 2003 with Wherever I Am I Am What Is Missing, which was recorded by Fiedler and Fixsen alone but with Lou Ciccotelli remaining as the percussionist. The band were dismayed by the album's poor commercial reception, apparently selling less than any of its predecessors. Fiedler has subsequently blamed online file sharing for Laika's sudden dip in sales, commenting: "We (had) sold steadily more and more until the last one which didn't do so well. And that coincided time-wise with everyone getting broadband. People were still coming to see the live shows, so go figure."

At around this time, Fiedler and Fixsen ended their romantic relationship. Although they maintained their musical partnership, the band's working life began to become strained. In 2009, Fiedler commented that "we were a couple both personally and professionally for a long time – over ten years – and the personal side of that is over and sometimes it's difficult to work together", citing the recently defunct Stereolab as a similar example of a band driven by a central romantic partnership which suffered professionally once that relationship had ended.

In 2005, Fiedler opted to devote most of her time to law school, something which she has cited as ensuring that "the band stopped being a going concern". Fixsen also took time out in order to travel the world. There were no formal announcements of a Laika break-up but the band has not released anything since Wherever I Am I Am What Is Missing. Laika is also no longer listed in the roster on the Too Pure homepage.

=== Post-Laika work and possible future activity ===
Fixsen continues to work as a sound engineer and producer. He co-produced English musician Lonelady's 2010 album Nerve Up. Fiedler, now known by her married name of Mags McGinnis, has divided time between several ventures, including music, writing, candlemaking, working in copyright law for the BBC, and running the rights clearance service Mineral Point Music Ltd. She played rhythm guitar for English rock band Wire on their 2008 tour of Europe and North America, replacing Bruce Gilbert. Fiedler has stated that "the decline of album sales due to illegal downloads made [her] recording and songwriting careers less financially viable".

Fixsen has claimed that Laika are "taking a break" with about half of an album already recorded, and that he and Fiedler will reconvene and complete the tracks at a future date. While Fiedler has not entirely discounted this suggestion or stated that Laika have formally split up, she has cited the difficulties of working with a former romantic partner on any project, as well as the obstacle of her current work. She has, however, admitted that it would be "great to finish (the album)" as well as to play some shows and tour some of the places which Laika did not visit during the band's active lifetime.

== Sound ==
Musically, the band drew from a variety of sources, including dub, trip hop, and drum and bass, as well as more atmospheric and "dreamy" pop approaches. Their work utilizes both electronic and organic approach to songwriting with live drums and percussion, together with guitars and samples, creating a complex layered and polyrhythmic blend of beats and diverse analogue sounds that defies simple categorization. They were among the first wave of bands to be classified as post-rock; in a 1994 article in Melody Maker profiling the genre, journalist Simon Reynolds described Laika's sound as a "blend of machine-music and flesh-and-blood funk... combining the 'magical', superhuman effects of sampling with the 'warmth' that comes from real-time interaction between players".

== Discography ==
=== Studio albums ===
- Silver Apples of the Moon (Too Pure, 1994)
- Sounds of the Satellites (Too Pure, 1997)
- Good Looking Blues (Too Pure, 2000)
- Wherever I Am I Am What Is Missing (Too Pure, 2003)

=== Compilation albums ===
- Lost in Space: Volume 1 (1993–2002) (Too Pure, 2003)

=== EPs ===
- Antenna EP (Too Pure, 1994)
- Almost Sleeping EP (Too Pure, 1997)
- Breather EP (Too Pure, 1997)

=== Singles ===
- "Uneasy" (Too Pure, 2000)
- "Black Cat Bone" (12" vinyl only; Too Pure, 2000)
- "Badtimes" (Too Pure, 2000)

=== Tracks on various artists compilations ===
- "If You Miss (Laika Virgin Mix)" (from Macro Dub Infection; 1995)
- "Lower Than Stars" (from Volume 12; 1995)
- "Looking for the Jackalope" (from Offbeat: A Red Hot Soundtrip; 1996)
- "German Shepherds" (from Whore: Various Artists Play Wire; 1996)
- "Looking for the Jackalope (236 Remix)" (from Beat Experience; 1997)
- "Black Cat Bone" (from Buffy the Vampire Slayer: Radio Sunnydale – Music from the TV Series [UK version]; 2003)
