= Wherever I Am I Am What Is Missing =

Studio album by Laika
- Released: 20 October 2003
- Length: 41:50
- Label: Too Pure
- Producer: Margaret Fiedler; Guy Fixsen

Laika chronology
Good Looking Blues (2000)	Wherever I Am I Am What Is Missing (2003)

Wherever I Am I Am What Is Missing is the fourth studio album by English band Laika. It was released on 20 October 2003 through Too Pure. It received generally favorable reviews from critics.

== Background ==
Laika were an English band formed in 1993. Wherever I Am I Am What Is Missing is the band's fourth studio album and a follow-up to Good Looking Blues (2000). It contains 10 tracks, clocking in at 42 minutes. The album's title comes from Mark Strand's poem, "Keeping Things Whole". The album was released on 20 October 2003 through Too Pure. A music video was released for "Alphabet Soup".

== Critical reception ==
Professional ratings
Aggregate scores
Source	Rating
Metacritic	71/100
Review scores
Source	Rating
AllMusic	3/5 stars
Pitchfork	5.1/10
Playlouder	3.5/5 stars

According to the review aggregator Metacritic, Wherever I Am I Am What Is Missing received "generally favorable reviews" based on a weighted average score of 71 out of 100 from 8 critic scores.

Lee Meyer of AllMusic wrote, "without the aid of the additional instrumentation from their previous records (such as trumpets, loops, samples, and the sorely missed electric guitars), Laika's typically airy atmosphere sounds more sterilized this time around." Adrien Begrand of PopMatters stated, "With this album, Laika boldly try to let the low-key music simply exist, letting the silences speak for themselves, easing the listener into the music, instead of overwhelming."

== Track listing ==
All tracks are written by Margaret Fiedler and Guy Fixsen.

Wherever I Am I Am What Is Missing track listing
No.	Title	Length
1.	"Girl Without Hands"	5:00
2.	"Falling Down"	5:18
3.	"Alphabet Soup"	4:07
4.	"Barefoot Blues"	3:50
5.	"Leaf by Leaf"	4:40
6.	"Diamonds & Stones"	3:46
7.	"Dirty Bird"	3:20
8.	"Fish for Nails"	3:17
9.	"Oh"	4:13
10.	"King Sleepy"	4:24
Total length:		41:50

== Personnel ==
Credits adapted from liner notes.

- Margaret Fiedler – production
- Guy Fixsen – production, recording, mixing
- Lou Ciccotelli – drums
- Dan Turner – recording assistance
- Richard Morris – mixing assistance
- Tony Cousins – mastering
- Alison Fielding – illustration, layout
