= When All Else Fails =

When All Else Fails may refer to:

- When All Else Fails (Bracket album), 2000
- When All Else Fails... (1989 16-17 album)
- When All Else Fails... (2005 16-17 album)
- "When All Else Fails", a song by Skyclad from the 1992 EP Tracks from the Wilderness
- When All Else Fails, a 2005 short film written and directed by David Ellison
