= Loco (God album) =

Live album by GOD
- Released: 1991
- Recorded: St. Mary's Church
- Genre: Experimental; industrial; noise rock; industrial metal; experimental rock
- Length: 53:34
- Label: Pathological
- Producer: Justin Broadrick

GOD chronology
Breach Birth (1990)	Loco (1991)	Possession (1992)

Loco is a live performance album by GOD, released in 1991 by Pathological Records.

== Track listing ==
All tracks are written by GOD

No.	Title	Length
1.	"Fucked"	11:11
2.	"Sick Puppy"	6:19
3.	"I'll See You in Hell"	13:07
4.	"Surf Locomotive"	5:40
5.	"Love's an Illness"	17:16

== Personnel ==
Adapted from the Loco liner notes.

GOD

- Steve Blake – tenor saxophone
- Lou Ciccotelli – drums
- Dave Cochrane – bass guitar
- John Edwards – double bass
- Tim Hodgkinson – alto saxophone
- Gary Jeff – bass guitar
- Scott Kiehl – drums
- Kevin Martin – lead vocals, tenor saxophone, cover art
- Russell Smith – guitar

Additional musicians and production

- Justin Broadrick – production
- Eddie Prévost – percussion

== Release history ==
Region	Date	Label	Format	Catalog
United Kingdom	1991	Pathological	CD	PATH 9
