= Human Distortion =

EP by 16-17
- Released: 1998
- Genre: Punk jazz, electronic
- Length: 26:15
- Label: Digital Hardcore Recordings (DHR)
- Producer: Kevin Martin

16-17 chronology
When All Else Fails... (2005)	Human Distortion (1998)	Gyatso (2008)

Human Distortion is an EP / MCD by 16-17, released in 1998 through Digital Hardcore Recordings (DHR).

== Reception ==
AllMusic staff writer William York writes: "the Human Distortion EP, which appeared in 1998 on Alec Empire's Digital Hardcore label sounded like the work of a completely different band..." From the DHR production notes: "Noisy industrial tech-step before everyone else tried to copy the style. Outstanding release on DHR!"

== Track listing ==
All music is composed by Alex Buess and Kevin Martin

No.	Title	Length
1.	"Digitized"	5:41
2.	"Autogeddon"	6:39
3.	"Digitized"	6:03
4.	"Headled"	7:52

== Personnel ==
Musicians

- Alex Buess – saxophone electronics, engineering
- Damian Bennett – bass
- Michael Wertmüller – drums
- Kevin Martin – samplers, production
- Dave Cochrane – bass

== Production and additional personnel ==
- Simon Heyworth – mastering
- The Pathological Puppy – Artwork

== Release history ==
Region	Date	Label	Format	Catalog
Europe	1998	Digital Hardcore Recordings (DHR)	EP	DHR 19
Europe	1998	Digital Hardcore Recordings (DHR)	CD	DHR MCD 19
