= Buess =

Buess is a Swiss surname. Notable people with the surname include:

- Alex Buess (born 1954), Swiss musician
- Daniel Buess (1976–2016), Swiss musician and sound artist
- Remo Buess (born 1977), Swiss football player
- Roman Buess (born 1992), Swiss football player
