= When All Else Fails... (1989 16-17 album) =

Live album by 16-17
- Released: 1989
- Genre: Punk jazz, industrial
- Length: 36:58
- Label: Vision
- Producer: 16-17

16-17 chronology
When All Else Fails... (2005 16-17 album) (2005)	When All Else Fails... (1989)	Gyatso (2008)

When All Else Fails... is the second vinyl LP by 16-17, released in 1989 through Vision. It is the second full-length vinyl album of the band.

== Reception ==
The Dusted Magazine writer Doug Mosurock reviews: "By the time of 1989’s When All Else Fails LP, 16-17 had become, unbelievably, even more aggressive, this time as a result of Kneubühler adding new technologies and a whole palette of unconventional sound-generating devices to his setup. The approach here is positively industrial at times, as on “Pedestrian Dub,” where sax and guitar are infused with enveloped, processed barbs that make each bleat and downstroke sound like wavering sheet metal, and Remond's shell tones all the more alien. The cyclic rhythms of their earlier work reappear on “Who Planned All This?” and “Clap Trap,” but the rictus of dance rhythms and the drive to innovate moved the band beyond earlier works..."

== Track listing ==
All music is composed by 16-17 Alex Buess, Markus Kneubühler, Knut Remond LP Side A = Title 1-3, LP Side B= Title 4-6).

No.	Title	Length
1.	"Sneak Preview"	4:30
2.	"Pedestrian Dub"	7:17
3.	"Browbeaten Beat"	6:59
4.	"Who Planned All This?"	6:29
5.	"Clap Trap"	5:06
6.	"Spit It Out!"	6:03

== Personnel ==
Adapted from the When All Else Fails... LP liner notes. Musicians:

16-17

- Alex Buess – saxophones, electronics, vocals, oboe
- Knut Remond – drums, percussion, electronic shaker,
- Markus Kneubühler – guitar, synths, electronics

Production

Tracks 2, 4, 5 & 6 recorded live on 9/12/1988 at restaurant Hirscheneck, Basel, on a 4-track recorder Tracks 1 & 3 recorded live on 31/3/1989 at the Kulturfabrik, Wetzikon, on a simple cassette tape deck. Mixed at the Wolf 2.8.1. studios in Basel.

- 16-17 – mastering
- Markus Kneubühler– Artwork
- Alex Buess – engineer

== Release history ==
Region	Date	Label	Format	Catalog
Europe	1989	Vision	Vinyl LP	Vision 27
