= Marco Papiro =

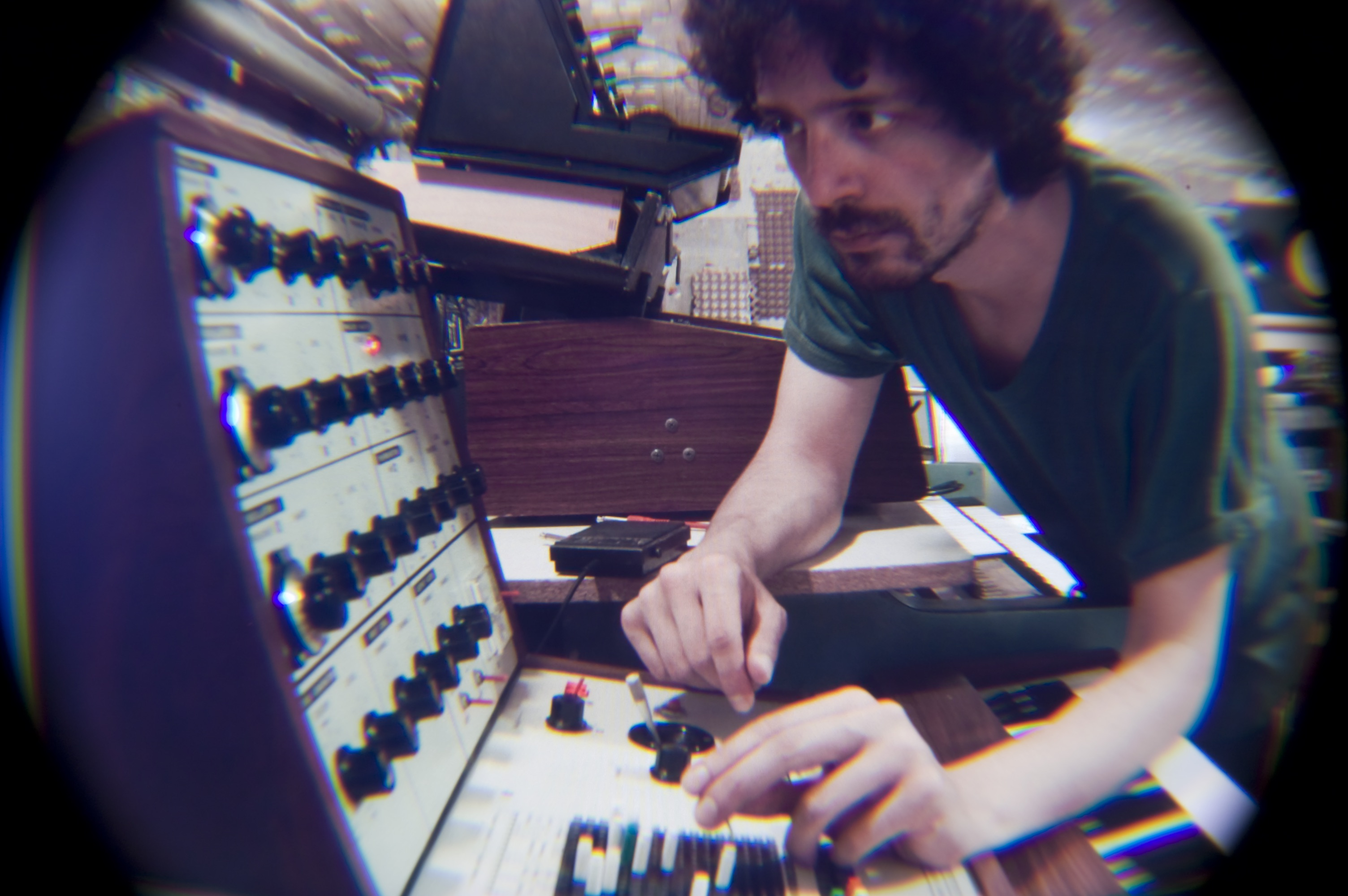

Background information
- Also known as: Papiro
- Born: 1975 (age 50–51)
- Origin: Basel, Switzerland
- Genres: Experimental, Electronic,
- Occupations: Musician, electronic music producer, graphic designer
- Years active: 1995 – present
- Labels: A Tree in a Field Records, Planam
- Website: http://papiro.ch/

Marco Papiro is a Swiss-Italian experimental musician, electronic music producer, sound artist and graphic designer born in Basel, Switzerland

== Biography ==
Classically trained from early age, he played violin, synthesizer and bass guitar in several bands before creating and releasing his own self-produced music as Papiro. His influences are numerous and audible: drone, minimal, folk from all times and places, psychedelic, contemporary classical, industrial – but also easy listening, pop and even new age music. His compositions are generally instrumental, meditative and hypnotic, but at times also bizarre and humorous. Papiro is a multi-instrumentalist with a fondness for synthesizers from the pre-programmable era – the EMS VCS3, the Moog Sonic Six, the Roland Jupiter 4 and the Serge Modular among others.

Marco Papiro has collaborated with various musicians such as Mani Neumeier, Hans Koch or Gyða Valtýsdóttir, and has been a „sound carrier“ for Damo Suzuki on several occasions. He is also a regular guest with Swiss garage-psych band Roy & the Devil's Motorcycle. In 2005 he founded the noise band Mir, together with Daniel Buess and Michael Zaugg (later also Marlon McNeill and Yanik Soland). Until Daniel Buess' death in 2016, the band played over a hundred shows in Europe, Brazil and Japan. As a producer he has initiated the re-release of "Herzschlag Erde / Verdunkelt die Sinne" and "Die singende Sternlaterne / Folklore des Weltalls 1982" by Swiss underground musician and outsider artist "Die Welttraumforscher", of whom he is a big admirer.

Papiro is also active as an unorthodox DJ. Together with Markus Stähli of Roy & the Devil's Motorcycle they host a monthly night were they expand their eclectic sets by using various speeds, additional instruments, prepared tapes and effects.

Marco Papiro has studied graphic design at the Basel School of Design from 1995 to 1999. As a graphic designer Marco Papiro is mostly known for the posters and album covers he has created for related artists such as Sun Araw, Spacemen 3 / Spectrum(with Peter Kember a.k.a. Sonic Boom), Panda Bear, Z'EV, Antoine Chessex, Oren Ambarchi and many others. He teaches at the Basel School of Design since 2006.

== Discography ==
- Papiro, Papiro a.k.a. Leaf album (2002) – Not on label, re-released as TREE008
- Avventure lontane (2006) – A Tree in a Field Records TREE017 / Some Fine Legacy SFL 005
- The Ghost Album (2006) – Interdisco ID16
- Rev (2010) – A Tree in a Field Records TREE028 / Some Fine Legacy SFL006
- Negativ White 2 (2012) – A Tree in a Field Records TREE035
- People on a Bridge (2014) – A Tree in a Field Records TREE050
- Teopatia (2014) – Planam PLANAM P
- Automare (2017) – Muscut, MUSCUT 7 (2012)
- Roy & the Devil's Motorcycle: Water Air Food & Love (2010) – Not on Label
- Roy & the Devil's Motorcycle : Tino: Frozen Angel OST (2014) – Voodoo Rhythm
- Compilation several tracks with Roy & the Devil's Motorcycle: Live at the Jolt Festival Basel (2014) – A Tree in a Field Records
- MIR Ex Modules (2005) – A Tree in a Field Records
- MIR, MIR(2009) – A Tree in a Field Records
- MIR Abandon Ship (2009) – A Tree in a Field Records
- MIR Shock Your Moneymaker (2013) – A Tree in a Field Records TREE039
- Rise (2019) – Solar Ipse Audio House SIAH06

== Publications ==
- Basler Kulturplakate 2001–2009 – Basler Plakatsammlung (2009)
- Min: The New Simplicity in Graphic Design – Thames & Hudson (2016) ISBN 9780500292198
- Prints and Drinks 3 – Typographie kann unter Umständen lesbar sein – Prints and Drinks (2016) Schwabe Verlag, ISBN 9783906819037
