= Silver Apples of the Moon (Laika album) =

Studio album by Laika
- Released: 17 October 1994
- Studio: Laika's home studio; Protocol (London)
- Genre: Experimental pop; post-rock; trip hop
- Length: 43:56
- Label: Too Pure

Laika chronology
| Silver Apples of the Moon (1994) | Sounds of the Satellites (1997) |

Silver Apples of the Moon is the debut studio album by the English band Laika. It was released on 17 October 1994 by Too Pure.

The album's title is derived from American electronic music composer Morton Subotnick's 1967 album of the same name.

== Critical reception ==
Professional ratings
Review scores
| Source | Rating |
|---|---|
| AllMusic | 4/5 stars |
| Christgau's Consumer Guide | (1-star Honorable Mention) |
| The Encyclopedia of Popular Music | 4/5 stars |
| Exclaim! | 9/10 |
| NME | 7/10 |
| Pitchfork | 8.1/10 |

Writing on its 2015 reissue for Exclaim!, Daniel Sylvester called Silver Apples of the Moon a "seminal" experimental pop album and "a welcome addition to any adventurous indie rock fan's collection."

Silver Apples of the Moon was ranked at number 16 on Fact's 2015 list of the 50 best trip hop albums of all time, and at number 36 on Treble's 2024 list of the 50 best post-rock albums.

== Track listing ==
All tracks are written by Margaret Fiedler and Guy Fixsen

| No. | Title | Length |
|---|---|---|
| 1. | "Sugar Daddy" | 5:25 |
| 2. | "Marimba Song" | 5:15 |
| 3. | "Let Me Sleep" | 4:23 |
| 4. | "Itchy & Scratchy" | 0:57 |
| 5. | "Coming Down Glass" | 4:57 |
| 6. | "If You Miss" | 5:19 |
| 7. | "44 Robbers" | 4:15 |
| 8. | "Red River" | 3:56 |
| 9. | "Honey in Heat" | 4:23 |
| 10. | "Thomas" | 3:26 |
| 11. | "Spider Happy Hour" | 1:40 |
| Total length: | | 43:56 |

== Personnel ==
Credits are adapted from the album's liner notes.

Laika

- Margaret Fiedler – vocals, sampler, guitar, Moog synthesizer, marimba, vibraphone, melodica, engineering, mixing
- Guy Fixsen – vocals, sampler, guitar, Moog synthesizer, marimba, vibraphone, melodica, engineering, mixing
- John Frenett – bass guitar
- Lou Ciccotelli – drums, percussion
- Louise Elliott – flute, saxophone

Production

- Neil – assistance
- Tony – assistance
- Giles – assistance
- Colm Ó Cíosóig – digital editing

Design

- Laika – sleeve
