= Consumed (God album) =

Live album by GOD
- Released: 1993
- Recorded: 28 March 1992 in Zurich, Switzerland
- Genre: Experimental
- Length: 67:54
- Label: Sentrax

GOD chronology
Possession (1992)	Consumed (1993)	The Anatomy of Addiction (1994)

Professional ratings
Review scores
Source	Rating
Allmusic	3/5 stars

Consumed is a live album by GOD, released on 19 October 1993 through Sentrax.

== Track listing ==
All tracks are written by GOD

No.	Title	Length
1.	"Head on Collision"	12:34
2.	"Suck on a Leech"	10:49
3.	"Detox"	17:19
4.	"Lust"	27:07

== Personnel ==
GOD

- Lou Ciccotelli – drums, percussion
- Dave Cochrane – bass guitar
- John Edwards – double bass
- Tim Hodgkinson – alto saxophone
- Scott Kiehl – drums, percussion
- Gary Jeff – bass guitar
- Kevin Martin – tenor saxophone, vocals
- Simon Picard – tenor saxophone
- Niko Wenner – guitar

Production and additional personnel

- Denis Blackham – mastering
- Dietmar Diesner – soprano saxophone
- Peter Morris – photography
