= V2 Institute for the Unstable Media =

Cultural institution in Rotterdam, the Netherlands

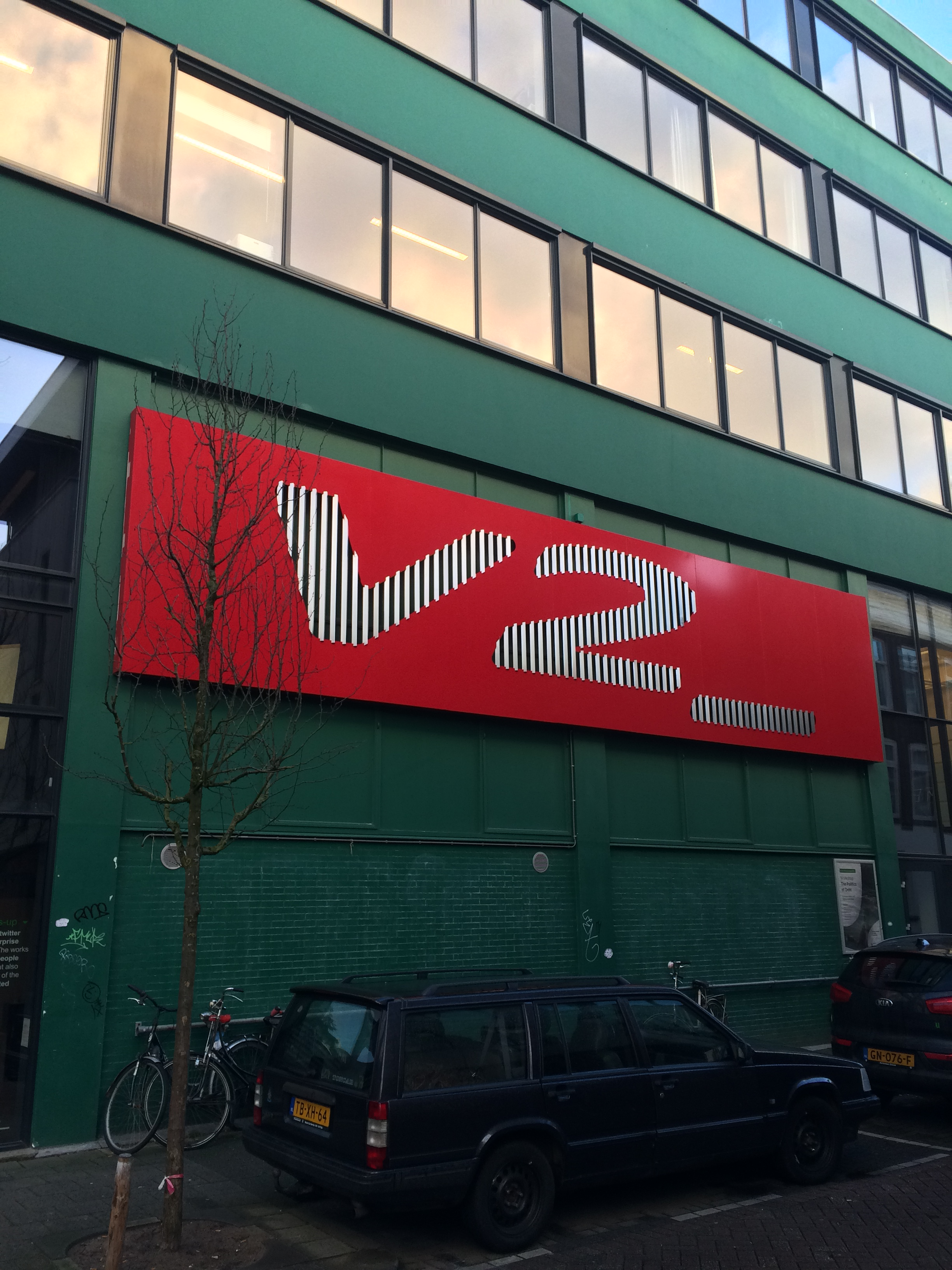
V2 Lab Building on Eendrachtsstraat in Rotterdam

V2_, Lab for the Unstable Media, founded in 1981, is an interdisciplinary center for art and media technology in Rotterdam, the Netherlands.

V2- presents, produces, archives, and publishes art created with new technologies, fostering debate on these issues. It provides a platform where artists, scientists, software and hardware developers, researchers, and theorists from various disciplines can share their findings and insights.

It was the main organizer of the Dutch Electronic Art Festival, which evolved from the Manifestations for the Unstable Media that V2_ had been organizing since 1987.

Over the years V2_ has collaborated with many artists and theorists, including for instance: Stelarc, Orlan, Symbiotica, Dick Raaymakers, Michel Waisvisz, Francisco López, Brian Massumi, Manuel de Landa, Paul Virilio, Rafael Lozano-Hemmer, Knowbotic Research, Ulrike Gabriel, Achille Mbembe, and Rem Koolhaas.

== Events and Residencies ==
V2_ has organized many residencies for emerging artists in the field of art & technology. Including amongst others the following thematic group exhibitions;

- Manifest[0] (1987)
- Machine Aesthetics (1997)
- Palm Top Theater Exhibition (2011)
- Data in de 21st Century (2015)
- The Gig Is Up (2016)
- To Mind is to Care (2020)
- Reasonable Doubt (2022)
- Waterworks (2022)
- Becoming Geological (2022)
- presence (Un) presence (2023)
- .NewArt { collection;} at V2_ (2023)
- {class} - On Consequences in Algorithmic Classification (2023)
- [up]loaded bodies (2024)

== Publications ==
V2_ has published a number of books on interactive art and related subjects like sociology, media theory, biology, and technological innovation.

1990s

- Book for the Unstable Media, 1992
- Interfacing Realities, 1997
- TechnoMorphica, 1997
- The Art of the Accident, 1998

2000s

- Machine Times, 2000
- Book for the Electronic Arts, 2000
- TransUrbanism, 2002
- My First Recession, 2003
- Making Art of Databases, 2003
- Information Is Alive, 2003
- Feelings Are Always Local, 2004
- Understanding Media Theory, 2004
- aRt&D, 2005
- Interact or Die!, 2007
- Dick Raaijmakers, Monografie, 2008
- The Architecture of Continuity, 2008

2010s

- The Politics of the Impure, 2010
- From Image to Interaction, 2010
- The Sympathy of Things, 2011
- Vital Beauty, 2012
- Iedereen Een Kunstenaar, 2014
- Een Stuk Van Mij Gaat Een Paar Keer, 2014
- Giving and Taking, 2014
- On the Threshold of Beauty, 2014
- The War Of Appearances: Transparency, Opacity, Radiance, 2016
- Wat Is Community Art?, 2016
- Machines Will Make Better Choices Than Humans, 2016
- Everyone Is An Artist, 2016
- To Mind is to Care, 2016

2020s

- 40 Years of V2_, 2021
- Sandra Trienekens: Participatieve kunst, 2021
- Marije Baalman: Composing Interactions, 2022
- Achille Mbembe: The Earthly Community, 2022
- Van Tuinen & Brouwer (eds.): Technological Accidents, Accidental Technologies, 2023
