= Ice (band) =

English industrial music band

ICE
- Origin: England
- Genres: Industrial metal, dub, experimental, industrial hip hop
- Years active: 1993–1998
- Labels: Pathologica, Crashh, Morpheus
- Members: Justin Broadrick; Lou Ciccotelli; Dave Cochrane; Kevin Martin
- Past members: John Jobaggy; Alex Buess

Ice (often stylized as ICE) is an industrial music band formed by guitarist Justin Broadrick and saxophonist/vocalist Kevin Martin.

== History ==
Keeping to a similar vein as their other musical project Techno Animal, Justin Broadrick and Kevin Martin opted for Ice to be a studio-based project. Drummer John Jobaggy, bassist Dave Cochrane and saxophonist/engineer Alex Buess were recruited to aid them in the recording process. Their debut album, Under the Skin, is comparable to Pure-era Godflesh and Martin's free jazz and dub work with God. The group went on hiatus for several years and Jobaggy was replaced by Laika drummer Lou Ciccotelli. By their second album, Bad Blood, the band had absorbed hip hop influences and nearly all the songs featured contributions from recognizable names in the underground rap scene. Blixa Bargeld, of Einsturzende Neubauten, also contributed his vocals to the music.

== Band members ==
Final line-up

- Justin Broadrick – guitar (1993–1998)
- Lou Ciccotelli – drums (1998)
- Dave Cochrane – bass guitar (1993–1998)
- Kevin Martin – vocals, saxophone, synthesizer, turntables (1993–1998)

Former members

- John Jobaggy – drums (1993)
- Alex Buess – saxophone (1993)

== Discography ==
Albums

- Under the Skin (Pathological, 1993)
- Bad Blood (In Bloom/Reprise/Warner Bros. Records, 1998)

Singles & EPs

- Quarantine (Carcrashh, 1995)
- Bad Blood Transfusion (with Underdog) (Morpheus, 1998)
- Headwreck (Morpheus, 1998)
- Trapped in Three Dimensions (Morpheus, 1999)
