= Sounds of the Satellites =

Studio album by Laika
- Released: 24 February 1997
- Studio: Laika's home studio; Protocol (London)
- Genre: Dream pop; trip hop
- Length: 76:52
- Label: Too Pure

Laika chronology
Silver Apples of the Moon (1994)	Sounds of the Satellites (1997)	Good Looking Blues (2000)

Singles from Sounds of the Satellites
- 1. "Breather" Released: 20 January 1997; 2. "Almost Sleeping" Released: 14 September 1997

Sounds of the Satellites is the second studio album by the English band Laika. It was released on 24 February 1997 by Too Pure.

== Critical reception ==
Professional ratings
Review scores
Source	Rating
AllMusic	4.5/5 stars
The Boston Phoenix	3/4 stars
Entertainment Weekly	A−
The Guardian	3/5 stars
Muzik	7/10
NME	5/10
Pitchfork	7.3/10
Q	4/5 stars
Rolling Stone	3.5/5 stars
Vox	7/10

Rob Brunner of Entertainment Weekly said, "Sounds of the Satellites' entrancing blend of heavy bass, gurgling electronics, and moody melodies – sung with low-key intensity by former Moonshaker Margaret Fiedler – is rich enough to hold your attention even when it doesn't move your feet." Jason Ankeny of AllMusic wrote that the album "is even better than its predecessor, a simultaneous expansion of the band's sonic palette and a brilliant refinement of their past innovations."

== Track listing ==
All tracks are written by Margaret Fiedler and Guy Fixsen.

No.	Title	Length
1.	"Prairie Dog"	4:56
2.	"Breather"	7:16
3.	"Out of Sight and Snowblind"	5:27
4.	"Almost Sleeping"	6:54
5.	"Starry Night"	3:19
6.	"Bedbugs"	5:52
7.	"Martinis on the Moon"	1:43
8.	"Poor Gal"	3:08
9.	"Blood + Bones (Moody Mix)"	4:37
10.	"Shut Off / Curl Up"	5:36
11.	"Spooky Rhodes"	6:17
12.	"Dirty Feet + Giggles"	21:47
Total length:		76:52

== Personnel ==
Credits are adapted from the album's liner notes.

Laika

- Margaret Fiedler – vocals, sampler, guitar, bass guitar, Minimoog synthesizer, drums, trumpet, engineering, mixing
- Guy Fixsen – vocals, sampler, guitar, bass guitar, Minimoog synthesizer, drums, trumpet, engineering, mixing
- Louise Elliott – flute
- Lou Ciccotelli – percussion
- Rob Ellis – drums, prepared piano, percussion, backing vocals

Additional musicians

- Alonso Mendoza – vibraphone

Production

- Jai Williams – mixing (assistant)
- Liam Molloy – mixing (assistant)
- Tony Cousins – mastering

Design

- Laika – layout
- Rachel Fixsen – original snowdome artwork
- John Summerhayes – photography
