= Greymachine =

Heavy metal musical group

- Origin: Abergele, Wales, United Kingdom
- Genres: Industrial metal, sludge metal, noise, post-industrial, drone
- Years active: 2006–present (on hold after 2009)
- Labels: Hydra Head
- Members: Justin Broadrick; Aaron Turner; Diarmuid Dalton; Dave Cochrane

Greymachine is an experimental music project founded in 2006. It is led by Godflesh and Jesu frontman Justin Broadrick. The act also features Isis frontman and guitarist Aaron Turner, Jesu bassist Diarmuid Dalton and Head of David bassist Dave Cochrane.

Broadrick started Greymachine as a solo project with some "drum beats I'd recorded, along with very abstract, improvised guitar parts and lot's [sic] of synth noise." He eventually enlisted other contributors for the project. The debut album of the act, Disconnected, was released on 4 August 2009, via Turner's own record label, Hydra Head Records. Allmusic described the album as "one of the most anticipated metal records of the year." The track “Vultures Descend” from the album was released as a promotional single.

About the project, Broadrick stated: "Most of my music has a strong sense of misanthropy. Greymachine just [more obviously] deals with self loathing, self disgust, frustration, isolation, disillusionment, ego, exhibitionism and utter confusion, fear and disenchantment."

== Personnel ==
- Justin Broadrick - guitar, vocals, electronics, programming, drums
- Dave Cochrane - bass
- Diarmuid Dalton - bass, synthesizer
- Aaron Turner - guitar, vocals, electronics

== Discography ==
Studio albums

- Disconnected (2009)

Singles

- "Vultures Descend" (2009)
