= Daniel Buess =

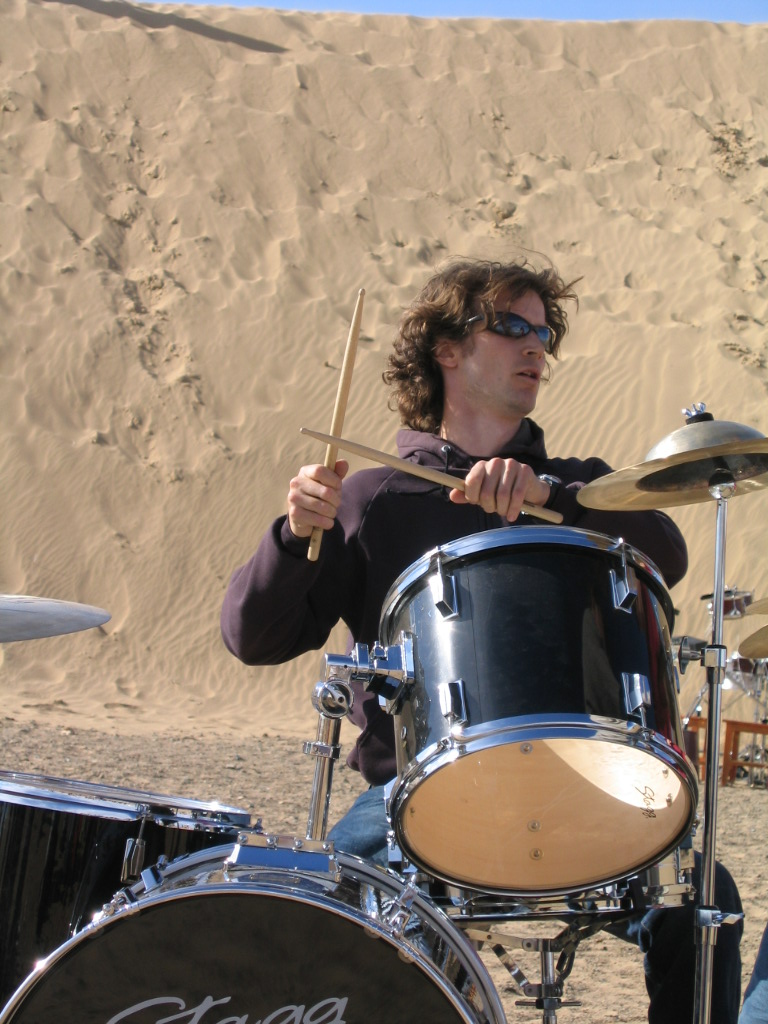

Background information
- Born: 28 January 1976
- Origin: Basel, Switzerland
- Died: 10 March 2016 (aged 40)
- Genres: experimental, noise, improvised music, contemporary classical music
- Occupations: drummer, percussion player

Daniel Buess (28 January 1976 – 10 March 2016) was a Swiss drummer, percussion player and sound artist from Basel.

== Biography ==
He studied percussion at the Musikhochschule Basel with Siegfried Schmid and with Isao Nakamura in Karlsruhe. His studies included the traditional south Indian percussion-music, specially the Mridangam from 1995 till 1998 and the Arabic percussion music during a three months residency in Cairo, Egypt from November 2007 till January 2008. He also worked as a percussion teacher at the Musikakademie Basel for many years.

Daniel Buess was involved in various groups and Ensembles in the realm of experimental and improvised music, such as the Ensemble Phoenix Basel of which he was a co-founder. He had been a core-member and solo-percussionist since its foundation in 1998. Other important acts are: CORTEX (with the composer, saxophone player and electronic-musician Alex Buess),16-17, Buggatronic (with James Hullick), HOW2 (with the percussionist Daniel Stalder), B&B (with the flautist Christoph Bösch), MIR (with Papiro and Michael Zaugg) and NoiseZone (with Artur and Sebastian Smolyn)

His collaborations include artists like Zbigniew Karkowski, Alex Buess, Hany Bedair, Kasper T.Toeplitz, John Duncan, Jürg Henneberger, Michael Wertmüller, Phill Niblock, Knut Remond, Z'EV, Julio Estrada, Antoine Chessex, Christoph Bösch, Volker Heyn, Thomas Lauck, Tim Hodgkinson, Marco Papiro, Iancu Dumitrescu, Ana Maria Avram, Jerome Noetinger, Cadlag and many others.

His drumming could be described as highly intense and energetic, archaic but nevertheless sophisticated and multitimbral: he tended to use electronic percussion devices as well as acoustic drums and percussion instruments. Daniel made an extensive use of his self-built percussion devices such as electronic metal shakers, percussive string instruments or electronically modified skin instruments.

On his regular tours through Europe, Asia and Australia, he performed at festivals for experimental music such as Huddersfield Contemporary Music Festival (2015) and Lucerne Festival, Warsaw Autumn (2006) as well as at several underground venues, open spaces, and independent venues.

In 2010 he organized the Echo Festival in Belgrade which was documented by a book as well as a CD. In November 2011 he curated and organized the very successful event TERRAINS: JOLT Swiss Australian Sonic Festival The live recordings of this festival have also been published on CD and vinyl.

In 2014, he released a solo album called "Pitch", dedicated to Zbigniew Karkowski at Pharmafabrik Recordings.

Buess died in early 2016, in his home town of Basel.

== Discography (selection) ==
- HOW2 Turing Machine (1998), percussion duo Daniel Buess and Daniel Stalder (1998). Compositions by Rico Gubler, Alex Buess, MaartenAltena and Iannis Xenakis Label: United Phoenix Records
- Ensemble Phoenix Basel: Portrait-CD Detlev Müller-Siemens (1999). Label: Wergo
- 16-17 (1999) "Mechanophobia" (The Soundsystem Mixes), Vinyl-EP, Label: Praxis UK
- Ensemble Phoenix Basel (2004) "Repulsion". Compositions by Tim Hodgkinson, Dror Feiler and Alex Buess.Label: United Phoenix Records
- Ensemble Phoenix Basel Live-Recordings (2008). Works by Jim Grimm, Beat Furrer, Jorge Sanchez-Jong, and Alex Buess. Label: Musiques Suisses/ Grammont Portrait
- Zbigniew Karkowski "Physiques Sonores" (Book& CD) Label:Editions Rip on/off
- MIR – MIR (2009) live at Reitschule, Bern. Co-release by 3 Labels: A Tree in a Field Records, Wallace Records (Italy) and Savage Land Records (France) CD and 12" vinyl versions.
- ECHO Echo Festival Belgrade 2010 (Book & CD) with Manja Ristic, Knut Remond, Antoine Chessex and Ivan Kadelburg. Label: UMNA-Art&Science
- CORTEX: "Vacuum Theory" (2011) Label: Praxis (Praxis 48) Vinyl 12" EP
- MIR: "Shock Your Moneymaker"(2013, CD/LP) Label: A Tree in a Field Records
- Zbigniew Karkowski _ "Unreleased Material", CD Compilation, Zbigniew Karkowski & Daniel Buess – live from LUFF does Tokyo.Label Fibrr Records
- Ensemble Phoenix Basel conducted by Jürg Henneberger, Marianne Schuppe Voice: "RITO" works by Giacinto Scelsi (2014) Label: telos music
- Antoine Chessex – "Selected Chamber Music Works 2009-2013", Ensemble Phoenix Basel plays "Metakatharsis". Label: Tochnit Aleph
- "Live at the JOLT-Festival Basel(2011)" Compilation (Vinyl+CD), 3 Tracks with CORTEX, 1 Track with Cortex and the Ensemble Phoenix Basel.CD and Vinyl 12" Label: A Tree in a Field Records
- "PITCH" (feat. Cal Lyall & Kikuchi Yukinori) by Daniel Buess. Label: Pharmafabrik Recordings (2014)
- "My Daily Noise", Duo with Kasper Toeplitz, Label: ZORA Records
- "SKIN CRAFT" – RIND & NOL Works by Alex Buess & Daniel Buess arranged by CORTEX. Label: Praxis Records (2016)
