= Appeal to Human Greed =

Remix album by GOD
- Released: 10 October 1995
- Genre: Experimental
- Length: 36:31
- Label: Big Cat

GOD chronology
The Anatomy of Addiction (1994)	Appeal to Human Greed (1995)

Professional ratings
Review scores
Source	Rating
Allmusic	2.5/5 stars

Appeal to Human Greed is a remix EP by GOD, released on 10 October 1995 through Big Cat. It contains five remixed tracks from the group's second album, The Anatomy of Addiction.

== Track listing ==
All tracks are written by GOD

No.	Title	Length
1.	"Gold Teeth" (Charles Atlas Mix)	4:44
2.	"Bloodstream" (The Evening Redness in the West Mix)	10:33
3.	"On All Fours" (Biomechanical Mix)	4:46
4.	"Tunnel" (Electro-Convulsive Mix)	6:44
5.	"Bloodstream" (Peckinpah Mix)	9:44

== Personnel ==
- Justin Broadrick – production on "On All Fours"
- Colm Ó Cíosóig – engineering on "Tunnel"
- Tony Cousins – mastering
- Bill Laswell – production on "Bloodstream"
- Chris Lovejoy – drums and bells on "Gold Teeth"
- The Lumberjacks – production on "Gold Teeth"
- Kevin Martin – production on "Bloodstream", cover art
- Robert Musso – engineering on "Bloodstream"
- Kevin Shields – production on "Tunnel"
