= 16-17 =

Swiss music band

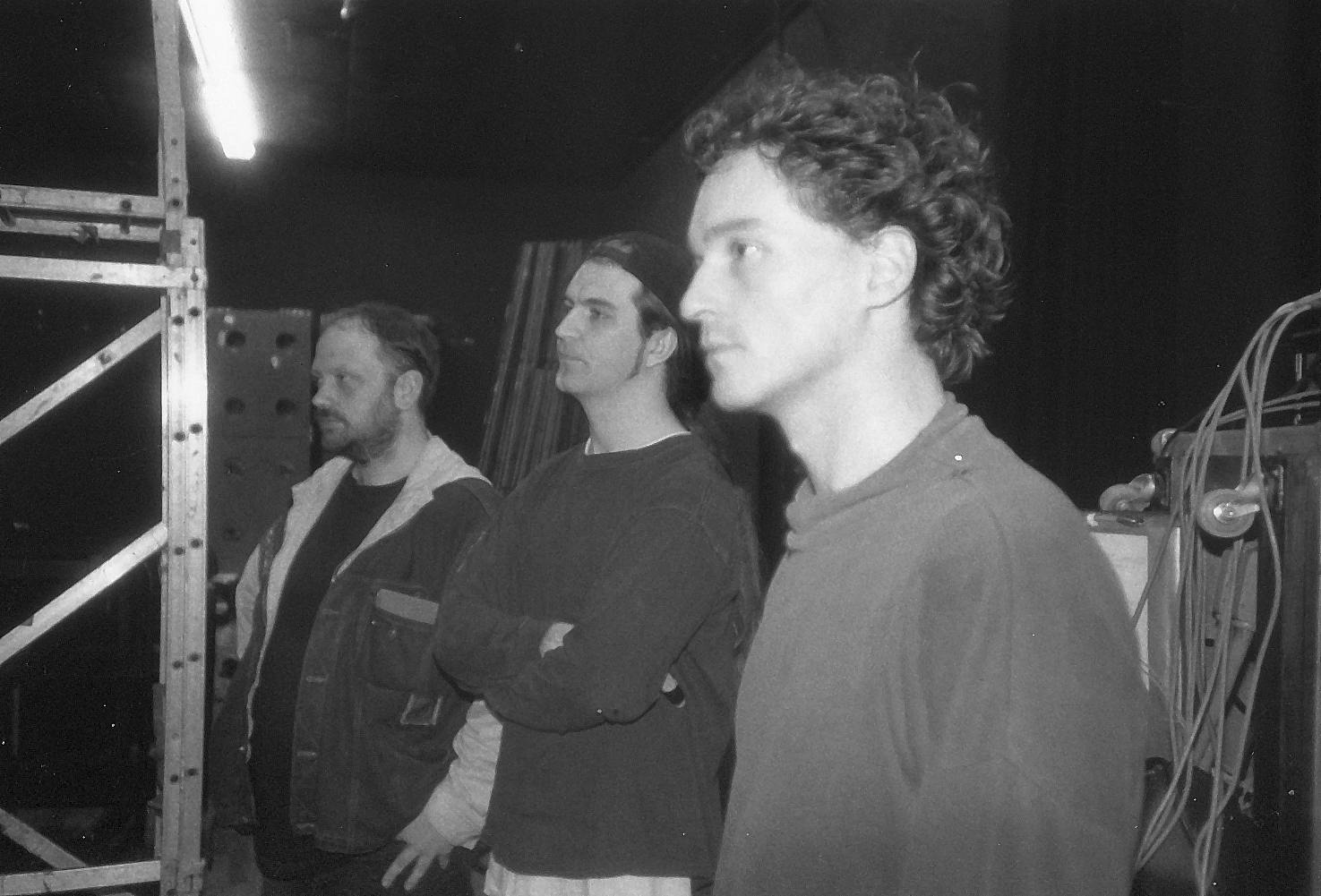

Background information
- Origin: Basel, Switzerland
- Genres: Punk jazz, industrial, jazzcore
- Years active: 1983–2000
- Labels: Pathological, Big Cat, Virgin, Savageland, Digital Hardcore
- Members: Alex Buess; Michael Wertmüller; Damian Bennet
- Past members: Knut Remond; Markus Kneubühler; Daniel Buess (died 2016); Kevin Martin; G. C. Green

16-17 is a band from Basel, Switzerland. Their music combines punk rock, hardcore punk, jazz and industrial music.

== Biography ==
16-17 was founded in 1983 by Alex Buess, Knut Remond and Markus Kneubühler. When the group played its first concerts in 1983 it was received with controversial reactions: there were hardly any groups that played in an approximately similar style. Only some years later around 1986 groups like Painkiller, Last Exit or The Flying Luttenbachers appeared . They played a similar mix of rough noise, heavily amplified instruments and free jazz inspired improvisation. 1983 to 1994 the group did a lot of tours and played many gigs all over Europe, Japan and USA. From this period there are three official releases: the cassette Buffbunker and Hardkore, the LP 16-17 (Label Rec Rec) as well as the LP When All Else Fails... (Label Vision/Praxis). These first three productions of the group are exclusively live recordings.

1994 Alex Buess met Kevin Martin during the recording sessions of the group Alboth! for their CD Liebefeld Alex Buess played saxophones on this album as a guest musician and Kevin Martin produced it. This first meeting of Buess and Martin was very important: they both got along very well: they both went similar paths, Kevin with his group GOD and Alex with 16–17. Consequently, 16-17 worked on the production of their first studio album Gyatso. The album was produced by Kevin Martin and G. C. Green (Godflesh) appeared as a guest musician. Kevin Martin said in an interview by Jason Pettigrew (Alternative Press): "I liked the sheer intensity of 16-17's Early Recordings very much and I intended to increase this intensity by the additional use of studio technology." He was indeed very successful. The CD found a lot of attention in the international press, the media and the audience.

After the production of Gyatso the line up of the band changed. The bass player Damian Bennett (Deathless, khost, Techno Animal) replaced Markus Kneubühler and the drummer Michael Wertmüller (Full Blast) replaced Knut Remond. 16-17 toured all over Europe with this new line up. The idea was to reproduce the sound of the Gyatso album live. The concert appearance at the Taktlos Festival 1995 was one of the highlights of 16-17's new sound. 1999 the EP Human Distortion was released on Alec Empire's Digital Hardcore Label (DHR) and in the same year the Mechanophobia EP appeared on Praxis the Berlin-based label. In autumn 1999 16-17 toured again extensively as 16-17 Soundsystem with Daniel Buess (MIR, My Daily Noise, Noise Zone) on drums. In 2000 the group disbanded.

It was very difficult to get hold of the 16-17 productions for quite a long time. But in 2005 Savageland Records a Lyon-based French record label re-released a CD box called When All Else Fails... a.k.a. Early Recordings and later in 2008 Gyatso. Weasel Walter has remastered both productions and Jason Pettigrew wrote extensive new liner notes for Gyatso. In 2020, an album of previously unreleased material recorded in 1995, titled Phantom Limb with guest musicians singer Eugene S.Robinson of Oxbow, vocalist Kasia Meow and guitarist Bigrogers Graf, was issued through Austrian label Trost Records. In 2021 the remastered vinyl version of Gyatso was released by the German label Praxis.

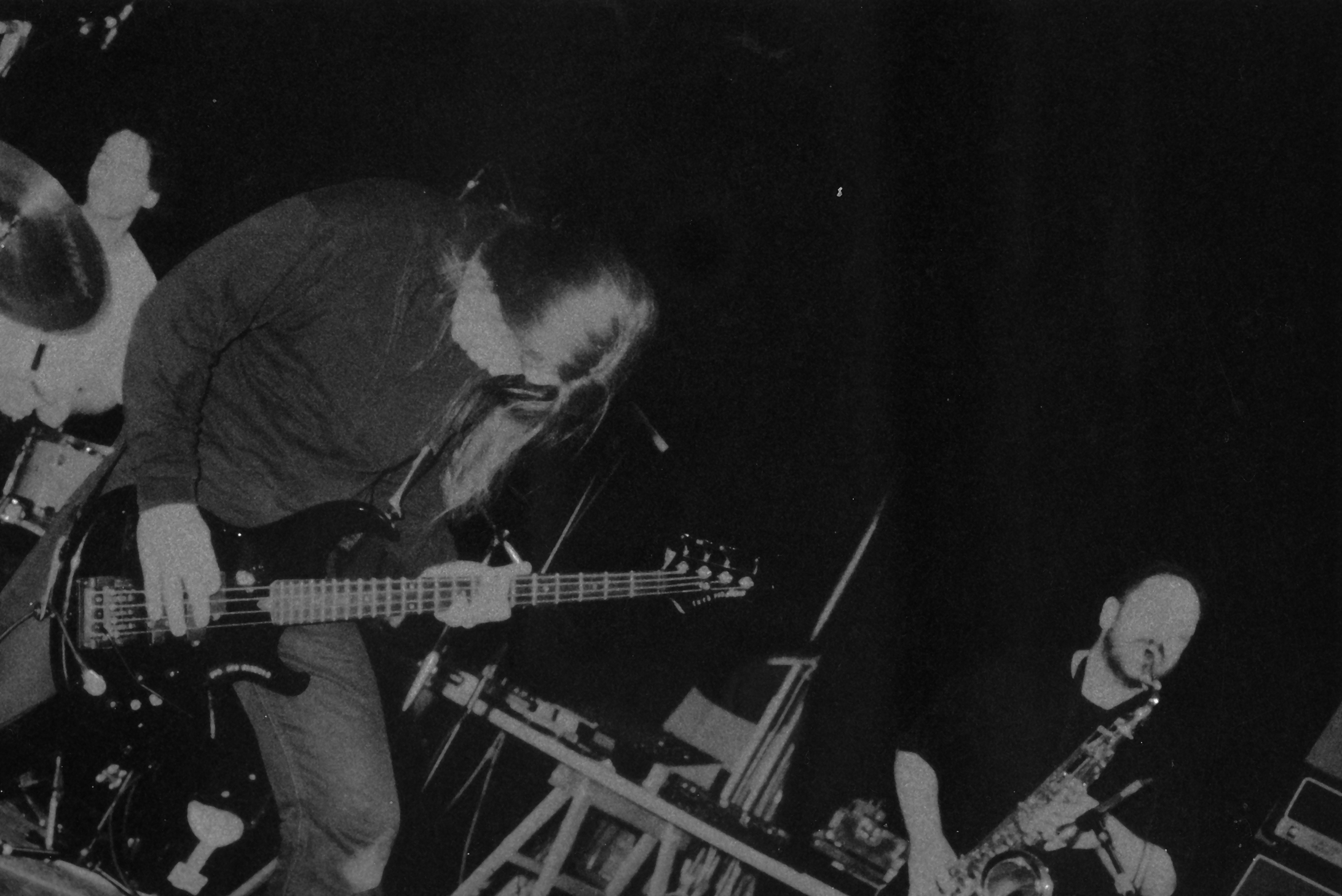
Live at Taktlos Festival 1995

== Discography ==
- 1984: Buffbunker & Hardkore (cassette, Calypso Now)
- 1986: 16-17 (LP, Rec Rec)
- 1989: When All Else Fails... (LP, Vision)
- 1993: Gyatso (CD, Pathological / Big Cat GB)
- 1993: 16–17 on Virgin Ambient compilation Jazz Satellites Vol 1
- 1998: Human Distortion (CD & EP, DHR)
- 1999: Mechanophobia (EP, Praxis)
- 2005: When All Else Fails... a.k.a. 16-17 Early Recordings (CD Box, new, remastered version of the first three LP productions on CD, Savageland Records)
- 2008: Gyatso (CD, new, remastered version with modified artwork and liner notes)
- 2020: Phantom Limb (LP, Trost)
- 2021: Gyatso (vinyl version) remastered 12" LP, Praxis, Berlin
