= Hinterland (Lonelady album) =

Studio album by LoneLady
- Released: March 2015
- Studio: Keyclub Recordings, Benton Harbor, Michigan
- Genre: Post-punk, alternative dance, dance-punk
- Length: 47:14
- Label: Warp
- Producer: Bill Skibbe

LoneLady chronology
Nerve Up (2010)	Hinterland (2015)	Former Things (2021)

Hinterland is the second studio album by Manchester solo artist Julie Campbell, known as Lonelady, released in 2015 by Warp.

== Background and recording ==
Campbell drew inspiration for the album from the landscapes of her childhood home in Audenshaw and the tower block she had been living in as an adult. She also drew on the architecture of Manchester. Campbell wrote some of the songs for Hinterland shortly after the release of her previous album, Nerve Up (2010). Hinterland was recorded over a period of 18 months, and was completed a year before it saw release. The album was recorded, mixed and produced by Campbell in her home studio in Manchester, with additional production with Bill Skibbe at Keyclub Recording Co., Michigan. Skibbe added live drums and LinnDrums to the mix.

== Reception ==
Professional ratings
Aggregate scores
Source	Rating
Metacritic	83/100
Review scores
Source	Rating
AllMusic	4/5 stars
Drowned in Sound	7/10
The Guardian	4/5 stars
The Line of Best Fit	8.5/10
musicOMH	4.5/5 stars
NME	8/10
The Quietus	(favourable)

At Metacritic, which assigns a normalised rating out of 100 to reviews from mainstream critics, Hinterland received an average score of 83, based on 12 reviews, indicating "universal acclaim". Gareth O'Malley, writing for Drowned in Sound, said that the album was "a layered record that reveals more with each listen." AllMusic critic Heather Phares said that "Hinterland's tough, hard-won beauty reveals Campbell coming into her own." Annette Barlow of the Quietus called the album "a masterpiece". In his review for the Line of Best Fit, Chris Todd said that Campbell had "gone and made the finest pop record of 2015 so far." David Welsh of musicOMH said that the album "has to be one of the year's most satisfyingly accomplished long players."

Bobby Gillespie of Primal Scream picked Hinterland as his album of the year, stating 'Its just fucking cool. Its got a strange atmosphere and unique mood..''

Publication	Rank	List
The Music Exchange (Record Store)	1	Top Ten of 2015
Piccadilly Records (Record Store)	5	Top 100 End of Year Review
Louder Than War	8	Albums of the Year 2015: 50-1
Q Magazine	23	Top 50 Albums of 2015
Mojo	38	Top 50 Albums of 2015
The Quietus	45	100 Albums Of 2015

== Track listing ==
All tracks are written by Julie Campbell.

No.	Title	Length
1.	"Into the Cave"	5:23
2.	"Bunkerpop"	5:56
3.	"Hinterland"	5:07
4.	"Groove it Out"	6:17
5.	"(I Can See) Landscapes"	3:08
6.	"Silvering"	6:19
7.	"Flee!"	5:35
8.	"Red Scrap"	4:51
9.	"Mortar Remembers You"	4:38

== Personnel ==
- Julie Campbell - guitar, keyboards, cello, vocals, bass, electronic drums, Clavinet, percussion, photography
- Andrew Cheetham - drums
- Andrew Mansberger - wood blocks, handclaps, Clavinet
