= Terminal Cheesecake =

English alternative rock band

- Origin: London
- Genres: Alternative rock, neo-psychedelia
- Years active: 1988–1995 2013–
- Labels: Wiiija Records, Clawfist Records, Pathological, World Serpent Records, Atypeek Music, Jackass
- Members: John Jobbagy; Russell Smith; Gordon Watson; Dave Cochrane; Neil Francis
- Past members: Gary Boniface; Mick Parkin; Joe Whitney; Steve Fez; Simon Doling; Paul Morris; MC Freaky; Dave Arbon
- Website: www.terminalcheesecake.com

Terminal Cheesecake are an English alternative rock band, originally formed by Gary Boniface (formerly of The Purple Things and The Vibes), Russell Smith (formerly of A.R.Kane and MARRS), Mick Parkin and John Jobbagy (also from The Vibes and Purple Things) in 1988 in North and East London.

== History ==
The name of the group was taken from a list of fictional 1960s bands written by Nick Saloman of The Bevis Frond.

Terminal Cheesecake were the first group to sign to Wiiija Records – their debut record, 1988's "Bladdersack" EP was also the first release on the label. Two albums for Wiiija followed in 1989.

The band recorded a John Peel Session in April 1990. This was followed by a third album, Angels in Pigtails which was released on Kevin Martin's Pathological label and described by rock critic Simon Reynolds as "an epic of ruination".

Russell Smith of the group was also a member of noise rock band Skullflower and one hit sampling wonders MARRS.

Terminal Cheesecake ceased activity in 1995. The group reformed in 2013 with Neil Francis from the band Gnod replacing Boniface as vocalist.

== Discography ==
=== Albums ===
- Johnny Town-Mouse (Wiiija Records, 1989)
- V.C.L. (Wiiija Records, 1989)
- Angels in Pigtails (Pathological, 1990)
- Pearlesque Kings of the Jewmost (World Serpent Records, 1992)
- King of All Spaceheads (Jackass, 1994)
- Cheese Brain Fondue: Live in Marseille (Artificial Head Records, Atypeek Music, 2015)
- Dandelion Sauce of the Ancients (Box Records, 2016)
- Le Sacre Du Liévre (Box Records, 2019)

=== Singles and EPs ===
- "Bladdersack" (Wiiija Records, 1988)
- "Meathead (Clawfist, 1990) a split 7-inch with GOD
- "Unhealing Wound" (World Serpent Records, 1991)
- "Gateau D’Espace" (Jackass, 1992)
- "Oily Hot Knife" (Jackass, 1994)
