= Breach Birth =

EP by GOD
- Released: 1990
- Genre: Experimental; industrial; experimental rock; industrial rock; industrial metal; noise rock
- Length: 12:41
- Label: Situation Two
- Producer: Justin Broadrick, Grant Showbiz

GOD chronology
Breach Birth (1990)	Loco (1991)

Breach Birth is an EP by GOD, released in 1990 by Situation Two.

== Track listing ==
All tracks are written by GOD

Side one
No.	Title	Length
1.	"Meat Head"	8:15

Side two
No.	Title	Length
1.	"Swine Fever"	1:46
2.	"Crash Victim"	2:40

== Personnel ==
Adapted from the Breach Birth liner notes.

GOD

- Kevin Martin – lead vocals, tenor saxophone
- Shane Rogan – guitar

Production and additional personnel

- Justin Broadrick – production
- Step Parikian – engineering
- Grant Showbiz – production

== Release history ==
Region	Date	Label	Format	Catalog
United Kingdom	1990	Situation Two	LP	SIT 65T
