= Vultures Descend =

Single by Greymachine

from the album Disconnected
- B-side: "We Are All Fucking Liars"
- Released: 12 May 2009
- Genre: Industrial metal, sludge metal, post-metal, noise
- Length: 18:12
- Label: Hydra Head
- Producer(s): Justin Broadrick

"Vultures Descend" is a song by experimental music project Greymachine, from the act's debut album, Disconnected. Produced by the band leader Justin Broadrick, it was released on 12 May 2009 as a single via bandmember Aaron Turner's own record label, Hydra Head Records.

== Background ==
The song was released as a 12" vinyl and a cassette single. The 12" single was limited to 600 copies that were pressed on black vinyl with white labels. Each copy has a "DJ style sleeve" with centre hole punched out and with a sticker in the upper right hand corner.

The song was also released for free download prior to the release of the single on Avalanche Recordings' official website.

== Critical reception ==
Tom Breihan of Pitchfork Media described the track as "an extended formless feedback wallow, along the lines of Broadrick's work as Final." Keith Carman of Exclaim! commented, "Apparently, the music is even more cacophonous and doomy than one might expect." Another Exclaim! staff reviewer, Cam Lindsay, described the song as a "mighty fine piece of ruthlessly sludgy noisecore."

== Track listing ==
1. "Vultures Descend" – 9:36
2. "We Are All Fucking Liars" – 8:36

== Personnel ==
- Justin Broadrick – drums, electronics, guitar, programming, vocals, mixing, production
- Dave Cochrane – bass
- Diarmuid Dalton – bowed bass, electronics
- Aaron Turner – electronics, guitar, vocals, layout design
