= Possession (God album) =

Studio album by GOD
- Released: 17 April 1992
- Recorded: Gateway Studio, Kingston
- Genre: Industrial; industrial rock; experimental rock; avant-garde; industrial metal
- Length: 67:51
- Label: Caroline/Virgin
- Producer: Kevin Martin

GOD chronology
| Loco (1991) | Possession (1992) | Consumed (1993) |

Professional ratings
Review scores
| Source | Rating |
|---|---|
| Allmusic | 4/5 stars |
| Robert Christgau | (neither) |

Possession is the debut studio album of GOD, released on 17 April 1992 by Caroline and Virgin Records.

== Accolades ==
| Publication | Country | Accolade | Year | Rank |
|---|---|---|---|---|
| Terrorizer | United Kingdom | 100 Most Important Albums of the Nineties | 2000 | * |
"*" denotes an unordered list.

== Track listing ==
All tracks are written by GOD.

| No. | Title | Length |
|---|---|---|
| 1. | "Pretty" | 3:57 |
| 2. | "Fucked" | 9:59 |
| 3. | "Return to Hell" | 5:27 |
| 4. | "Soul Fire" | 9:52 |
| 5. | "Hate Meditation" | 4:49 |
| 6. | "Lord, I'm On My Way" | 10:22 |
| 7. | "Love" | 16:46 |
| 8. | "Black Jesus" | 6:49 |

== Personnel ==
Adapted from the Possession liner notes.

GOD

- Steve Blake – alto saxophone, baritone saxophone, tenor saxophone, didgeridoo
- Justin Broadrick – guitar
- Lou Ciccotelli – drums
- Dave Cochrane – bass guitar
- John Edwards – double bass
- Tim Hodgkinson – alto saxophone, bass clarinet
- Gary Jeff – bass guitar
- Scott Kiehl – drums, percussion, mixing
- Kevin Martin – lead vocals, tenor saxophone, sampler, production, mixing

Additional musicians

- Peter Kraut – piano (4, 5, 7, 8)
- Gary Smith – guitar (8)
- John Zorn – alto saxophone (3, 5, 6), mixing

Production and additional personnel

- Silvia Edin – cover art
- Oz Fritz – mixing
- Steve Lowe – recording
- Imad Mansour – assistant engineering
- Peter Morris – photography
- Howie Weinberg – mastering

== Release history ==
| Region | Date | Label | Format | Catalog |
|---|---|---|---|---|
| United Kingdom | 1992 | Virgin | CD | CDVE 910 |
| United States | 1992 | Caroline | CD, CS | CAROL 1874 |
