= Slab! =

British band

SLAB!
- Origin: Leamington Spa, England
- Genres: Industrial music, alternative rock
- Years active: 1986–1991, 2009–present
- Label: Ink
- Members: Stephen Dray; Paul Jarvis
- Past members: Dave Morris; Hugh Rawson; Neill Woodger; Bill Davies; Robin Risso; Margaret Ward; Scott Kiehl; Rob Allum; Graham Sherman

SLAB! are an industrial music/alternative rock band initially active between the mid-1980s and early 1990s. They reformed in 2009.

== History ==
The band's first release was the "Mars on Ice" 12-inch single in 1986 on Dave Kitson's Ink Records (an offshoot of his Red Flame label). This received airplay from John Peel who invited them to record a session for his BBC Radio 1 show the same year. Peel had given the band their first ever national press by devoting his whole column in the "Observer" to SLAB! having witnessed their first ever London gig. It was from this gig that the band got signed to Ink Records. The band released their second single "Parallax Avenue" in early 1987 which saw them in the lower reaches of the UK Independent Chart, and in May that year their debut mini-LP Music From The Iron Lung was issued, reaching number 21 on the Independent Albums chart. "Smoke Rings" gave them their highest charting single, reaching number 31 on the indie chart in July 1987, and towards the end of the year the band's first long-playing album, Descension was issued.

"Descension" was a major change in sound and style; its strong riffs and heaviness saw the band moving into new sonic territory. It was this album with its heavily detuned fuzz bass riffs that has influenced, among others, later bands such as Godflesh, artists including Justin Broadrick, Kevin Martin and God, Nicholas Bullen and Mick Harris from Scorn. Artists as diverse as Stephen O'Malley and Steven Wilson have both proclaimed their admiration for "Descension". When the album was released it received outstanding reviews from Dave Haslam in "New Musical Express" and from both "Sounds" and "Melody Maker". The fourth single "People Pie" was released shortly after "Descension". "Ikon Video" from Manchester, who had been shooting live videos of the group for the past two years, released a promo video of the single which was shown on BBC2 "Snub TV".

A third John Peel session was recorded in February 1988 This session saw the band experimenting with further free playing. Kevin Martin included a track from the session on the compilation album "Jazz Satellites". The band also appeared as the fictional Noise rock group 'Earthworks' in "Bad Vibrations", the third episode of the second series of the BBC comedy-drama A Very Peculiar Practice, broadcast in March 1988.

After more line up changes throughout 1988 the band recorded its second full album "Sanity Allergy" following the arrival of Scott Kiehl and Lou Cicotelli from America. This was a much denuded sound and far more conventional than "Descension" (the songwriting duties were shared amongst all members of the band on "Sanity Allergy") and the band instantly underwent more line-up changes as the album was released - Kiehl and Cicotelli returned to Chicago.

Stephen Dray and Paul Jarvis surrounded themselves with new like minds in Rob Allum and Graham Sherman ("Sherman at the Controls" writer at "NME"). New material was written in a similar style to "Descension" and a joint headline tour of the UK and Scandinavia with The Young Gods was undertaken to rapturous live reviews from "Dele Fedele" in "NME" and from "Melody Maker".

On return to the UK in late 1989, the band found that Red Flame Records and Ink Records were ceasing to trade. In February 1990, the band stopped practicing but there was no split announced. Stephen Dray and Graham Sherman began recording together for Guerilla Records under the name Euphoria. A 'best of' Slab! compilation, Ship of Fools, comprising tracks from "Descension", "Sanity Allergy" and the earlier singles was released in 1990.

"Descension" was subsequently reissued by Relapse Records where it was equally well-received and influenced a further group of artist and musicians. Vocalist Stephen Dray and guitarist Paul Jarvis reformed the group in 2009 and began working on new material, releasing a 4 song EP “Revelations Chapter One” on “Iron Triangle” record label.

== Musical style ==
The band's style has been described as a mixture of "modern funk, freeform jazz and punk white noise". Dray said of the band's music:

"Why just like modern jazz? Why just like Boyd Rice, or Sonic Youth, or The Swans? Why not mutate the whole bloody thing and make the most godawful sound that you can. We want to take that rock element to the extreme and make it do things that it was never theoretically designed to do."

== Members ==
- Stephen Dray - vocals, saxophone
- Paul Jarvis - guitar
- Dave Morris - guitar
- Nick Page - guitar
- Hugh Rawson - trumpet
- Neill Woodger - trombone
- Bill Davies - bass guitar
- Robin Risso - drums
- Margaret Ward - backing vocals, tapes
- Scott Kiehl - drums, bass
- Lou Ciccotelli - drums

== Discography ==
=== Albums ===
- Music from the Iron Lung mini-LP (1987), Ink - UK Indie #21
- Descension (1987), Ink - UK Indie #30
- Sanity Allergy (1988), Ink
- Ship of Fools (1991), Ink - compilation

=== Singles ===
- "Mars On Ice" (1986), Ink
- "Parallax Avenue" (1987), Ink - UK Indie #45
- "Smoke Rings" (1987), Ink - UK Indie #31
- "People Pie" (1988), Ink
- "Death's Head Soup" (1989), Ink
- ”Revelations Chapter One” (2009), Iron Triangle

=== Compilation appearances ===
- On the Dotted Line...(Here) (1987), EMI: "Parallax Avenue" (live)
- Ashes and Diamonds (1988), Red Flame/Ink: "Dolores"
- Funky Alternatives 5 (1990), Concrete: "Death's Head Soup"
- New Wave Club Class•X 2 (1991), Antler-Subway: "Mars On Ice"
- 98 New Wave Club Class•X Traxx!!! (1996), Play It Again Sam: "Mars On Ice"
- Jazz Satellites Vol.1 : Electrification (1996), Virgin: "Bride of Sloth"
- Alternator (1996), Concrete: "Death's Head Soup"
- Industrial Rock (2000), Edel America: "Death's Head Soup"

== Radio sessions ==
- 1986 John Peel session, recorded 12 August 1986, transmitted 22 September 1986:

1. "Mars On Ice"
2. "Painting The Forth Bridge"
3. "Dust"
4. "The Animals Are All Eating People Pie"

- 1987 John Peel session, recorded 1 February 1987, transmitted 16 February 1987:

1. "Undriven Snow"
2. "Mining Town In Lotusland"
3. "Blood Flood"
4. "Parallax Avenue"

- 1988 John Peel session, recorded 21 February 1988, transmitted 7 March 1988:

1. "Big Sleeper"
2. "Last Detail"
3. "Killer for a Country"
1. "Bride of Sloth"
