= When All Else Fails... (2005 16-17 album) =

When All Else Fails... (1983–1998)

Live album by 16-17
- Released: May 20, 2005
- Recorded: 1983–1989
- Genre: Industrial, punk jazz
- Length: 86:51
- Label: Savaage Land
- Producer: 16-17

16-17 chronology
| Human Distortion (1998) | When All Else Fails... (1983–1998) (2005) | Gyatso (2008) |

The two-CD collection, When All Else Fails...a.k.a. Early Recordings, gathers together three different recordings by Swiss trio 16-17: 1984's Hardkore & Buffbunker (disc one, tracks 8–12), 1987's 16-17 (disc one, tracks 1–7), and 1989's When All Else Fails (disc two). This live album by the industrial punk jazz band was released on May 20, 2005, by Savage Land.

== Reception ==
Professional ratings
Review scores
| Source | Rating |
|---|---|
| AllMusic | 4/5 stars |

AllMusic staff writer William York calls the formula simple: "maniacal drumming, noisy guitar, and paint-peeling saxophone steamrolling ahead for three to five minutes at a time". And the Dusted Magazine writer Doug Mosurock reviews: "By the time of 1989’s When All Else Fails LP, 16-17 had become, unbelievably, even more aggressive, this time as a result of Kneubühler adding new technologies and a whole palette of unconventional sound-generating devices to his setup. The approach here is positively industrial at times, as on “Pedestrian Dub,” where sax and guitar are infused with enveloped, processed barbs that make each bleat and downstroke sound like wavering sheet metal, and Remond's shell tones all the more alien. The cyclic rhythms of their earlier work reappear on “Who Planned All This?” and “Clap Trap,” but the rictus of dance rhythms and the drive to innovate moved the band beyond earlier works..."

== Track listing ==
All tracks composed by Alex Buess, Markus Kneubuehler, Knut Remond (16-17)

Disc One: 16-17 / Buffbunker & Hardkore
| No. | Title | Length |
|---|---|---|
| 1. | "Kat" | 2:40 |
| 2. | "Speech" | 1:22 |
| 3. | "Direkt B" | 3:28 |
| 4. | "Davul" | 4:15 |
| 5. | "Eva 4" | 3:27 |
| 6. | "Bomba Bomba" | 8:42 |
| 7. | "Watch!" | 7:40 |
| 8. | "Hardkore I" | 2:59 |
| 9. | "Hardkore II" | 4:08 |
| 10. | "Buffbunker IV" | 7:04 |
| 11. | "Hardkore III" | 2:34 |
| 12. | "Hardkore IV" | 2:08 |
| Total length: | | 50:27 |

Disc Two: When All Else Fails...
| No. | Title | Length |
|---|---|---|
| 1. | "Sneak Preview" | 4:30 |
| 2. | "Pedestrian Dub" | 7:17 |
| 3. | "Browbeaten Beat" | 6:59 |
| 4. | "Who Planned All This?" | 6:29 |
| 5. | "Clap Trap" | 5:06 |
| 6. | "Spit It Out" | 6:03 |
| Total length: | | 36:24; 86:51 (Total) |

== Personnel ==
Adapted from the When All Else Fails... liner notes.

16-17

- Alex Buess – saxophones, electronics, vocals, oboe (track 4), bass (tracks 10 and 13)
- Knut Remond – drums, percussion, bass (track 4), electronic shaker, Welson organ
- Markus Kneubühler – guitar, synths, electronics

Additional musicians and production

- Alison Gangler – shawm and oboe (track4)
- Weasel Walter – mastering
- 16-17 & RIV – artwork
- Alex Buess – engineer

== Release history ==
| Region | Date | Label | Format | Catalog |
|---|---|---|---|---|
| Europe | 2005 | Savage Land | CD | SL 01 and 02 |
