= Bad Blood (Ice album) =

Studio album by Ice
- Released: 20 October 1998
- Recorded: ???
- Genre: Trip hop; industrial hip-hop; industrial; industrial rock
- Length: 53:46
- Label: Morpheus Records In Bloom/Reprise/Warner Bros. Records; 47068
- Producer: Kevin Martin

Ice chronology
Under the Skin (1993)	Bad Blood (1998)

Professional ratings
Review scores
Source	Rating
Allmusic	3/5 stars

Bad Blood is the second and final album by Ice. The album is most notable for its fusion of industrial music and hip hop, as well as the number of guests on the album.

== Track listing ==
1. "X-1" – 7:13
  - Vocals – Blixa Bargeld, Sebastian Laws
2. "The Snakepit" – 5:54
  - Scratches – DJ Vadim
  - Vocals – Blixa Bargeld, Toastie Taylor
3. "Trapped in Three Dimensions" – 7:38
  - Vocals: A-Syde, El-P
4. "Dusted" – 6:53
  - Vocals: Sebastian Laws, Sensational
5. "A New Breed of Rat" – 11:55
  - Vocals: Blixa Bargeld
6. "Devils" – 7:04
7. "When Two Worlds Collide" – 7:09
  - Scratches - DJ Vadim
  - Vocals - Blixa Bargeld, Priest, Sebastian Laws

== Personnel ==
Ice

- Kevin Martin – Vocals, Saxophone, Synthesizer, Turntables
- Justin Broadrick – Guitar
- Dave Cochrane – Bass
- Lou Ciccotelli – Drums, Percussion

Additional personnel

- Scott Harding – Drum Loops, Samples
- Alex Buess – Engineering
- Simon Heyworth – Mastering
