= Antoine Chessex =

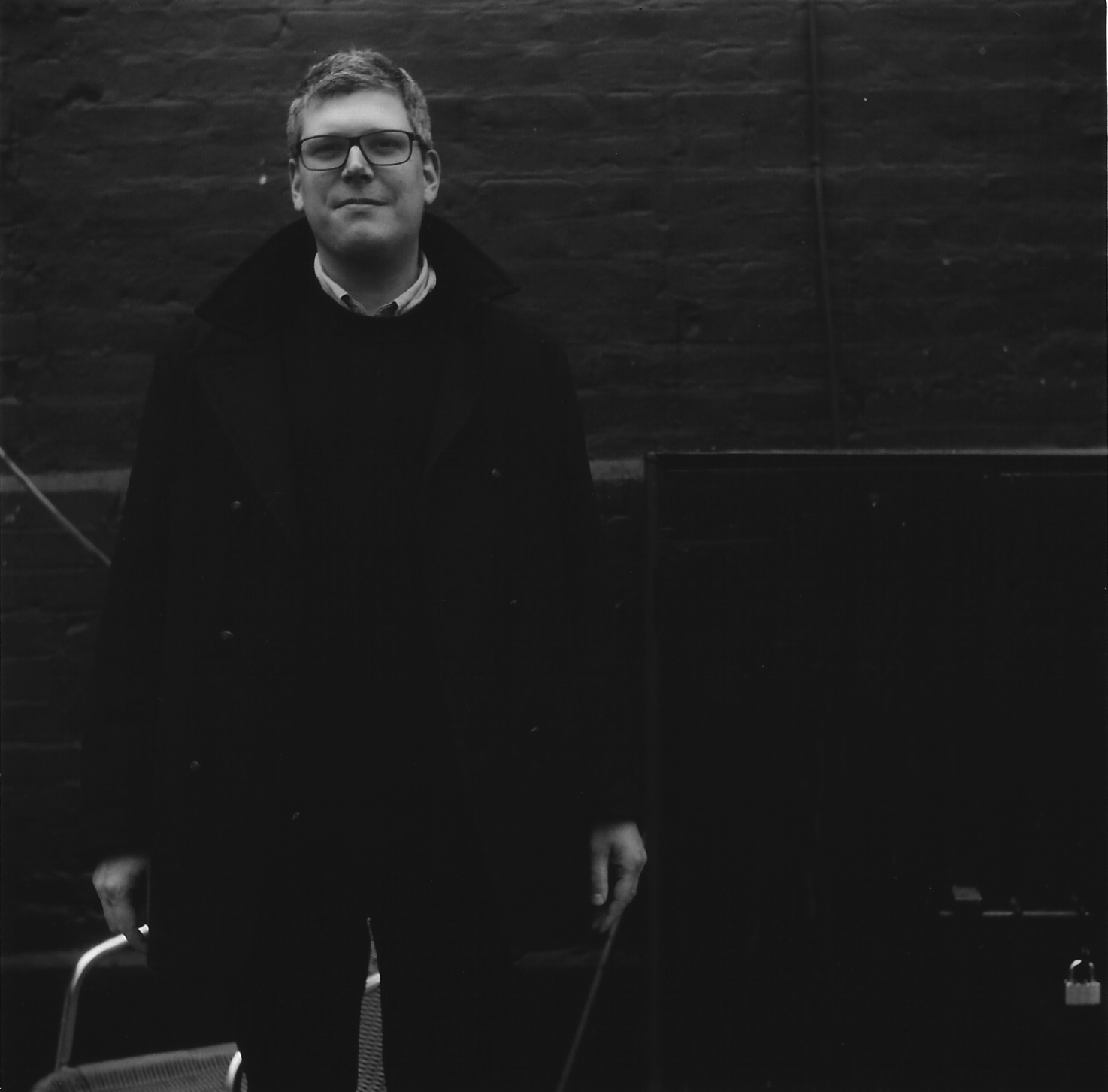

Background information
- Born: 1980 (age 45–46)
- Origin: Vevey, Switzerland
- Genres: Experimental, Noise, Sound Art, Improvised music, Contemporary classical music,
- Occupations: Musician; composer; sound artist; lecturer; researcher
- Formerly of: Monno

Antoine Chessex (1980 in Vevey) is a Swiss artist and cultural theorist who works with sound. Selected instrumental works as a composer include Les Abîmes Hallucinés (for Ensemble Proton in Bern), La Résonance des Ruines (for ICTUS Ensemble in Brussels), Plastic Concrete (For Apartment House in London), The Experience of Limit, and Echo/cide.

As a saxophone player and performer in the field of Noise and Drone music, Chessex has appeared at numerous festivals and venues like CTM Festival in Berlin, Unsound Festival in Krakow, Cafe OTO in London, Issue Project Room in New York, Sonic Protest Festival in Paris or LUFF festival in Lausanne.

Antoine Chessex is the recipient of a Swiss Music Prize from the Federal Office of Culture in 2020, as well as an Artist Prize "Werkjahr" from the City of Zurich in 2018.

Chessex is also a founding member of the noise-rock band Monno with whom he toured extensively. Collaborations with musicians Lasse Marhaug, Zbigniew Karkowski, Jérôme Noetinger, John Duncan, Maja Ratkje, Chris Corsano, Pat Thomas, Okkyung Lee, Axel Dörner, architect Christian Waldvogel and media artist Ulrike Gabriel (Flow, 2002).

Antoine Chessex is currently a lecturer and researcher at the Zurich University of the Arts where he works on the transdisciplinary exploration of artistic research, sound studies and cultural studies.

== Discography ==
chamber music:

- Echo/cide & The Experience of Limit (Tochnit-Aleph, 2020)
- Chessex, Noetinger & Apartment House (Bocian, 2016)
- Furia played by Werktag (A Tree in A Field, 2015)
- Selected Chamber Music Works (Tochnit-Aleph, 2014)
- Dust for 3 violins, backtape and electronics (Cave12/Metamkine, 2011)

solo works:

- Subjectivation (Rekem/Fragment Factory, 2018)
- Multiple (Musica Moderna, 2014)
- Errances (Under Platform, 2013)
- Fools (Tourette, 2010)
- Le Point Immobile (Mnoad, 2010)
- Terra Incognita (Absurd, 2009)
- Power, stupidity & ignorance (Petit mignon, 2009)
- Untitled acoustic (Naivsuper, 2008)
- Lost in destruction (Editions Zero, 2008)
- Silences (Tanzprocesz, 2007)
- No (Imvated, 2004)

with Monno:

- Cheval Ouvert (2xLP, Staalplaat/Petit Mignon, 2015)
- Cheval Ouvert (Idiosyncratics, 2013)
- Ghosts (Conspiracy, 2009)
- Error (Conspiracy, 2007)
- Untitled (Soundimplant, 2004)
- Candlelight technology (Subdeviant, 2003)

collaborations:

- Maiandros with Francisco Meirino & Jérôme Noetinger (Cave12, 2021)
- Der dritte Treffpunkt (Clean Feed, 2017)
- Maja Ratkje's Crepuscular Hour (Rune Grammofon, 2016)
- Coi Tormenti with Valerio Tricoli (Dilemma, 2010)
- Calcination (Utech, 2009)
- With Dave Phillips (Tochnit aleph compilation, 2005)
- Swiftmachine (Creative sources, 2004)
- Kainkwatett (Schraum, 2003)
