= Nerve Up =

Studio album by Lonelady
- Released: 22 February 2010
- Recorded: March–April 2009
- Studio: Ancoats, Manchester
- Genre: Indie rock
- Length: 40:22
- Label: Warp
- Producer: Julie Campbell, Guy Fixsen

Lonelady chronology
Nerve Up (2010)	Hinterland (2015)

Nerve Up is the debut album by Lonelady, released by Warp on 22 February 2010.

== Background ==
In an interview for Pop Matters with Guy Mankowski Julie Campbell stated that she wanted the album to "crackle with energy and clarity, and retain the intimacy of a home-recorded aesthetic". She elaborated on her artistic process, saying "some of those songs first existed as four-track home recordings; I was using minimal means and this informed the aesthetic. It is not, for example an intentionally bass-less record; I just didn’t, and don’t, think in terms of conservative/traditional arrangements. I started out with a crappy keyboard and a few other bits and pieces (but no bass guitar) and this small armoury of tools instilled a love of the economical, the stripped, the stark, the trebly and harsh."

== Reception ==
Nerve Up
Review scores
Source	Rating
Allmusic	4/5 stars
NME	(9/10)
Pitchfork Media	(7.7/10)
The Skinny	4/5 stars
Q	4/5 stars
The Quietus	(8/10)

David Raposa of Pitchfork Media awarded Nerve Up a 7.7 rating, praising the album's "wonderful wall-to-wall skittishness" and commenting on its "nervous, contagious energy".NME reviewer John Doran celebrated "the arrival of a fresh and invigorating voice" and awarded a 9 out of 10 rating. Nerve Up narrowly missed out on a Guardian First Album Award.

== Track listing ==
All tracks composed by Lonelady

1. "If Not Now" - 3:21
2. "Intuition" - 3:28
3. "Nerve Up" - 4:41
4. "Early the Haste Comes" - 3:48
5. "Marble" - 5:07
6. "Immaterial" - 3:38
7. "Cattletears" - 4:09
8. "Have No Past" - 3:41
9. "Army" - 3:01
10. "Fear No More" - 5:35

== Personnel ==
- Julie Campbell - artwork, photography
- Andrew Cheetham - drums
