= Under the Skin (Ice album) =

Studio album by Ice
- Released: 1993
- Recorded: Jon Wakelin/Jasmine Cafe, Birmingham
- Genre: Industrial; industrial metal; dub; illbient; industrial hip hop; post-metal
- Length: 77:08
- Label: Pathological
- Producer: Kevin Martin

Ice chronology
Under the Skin (1993)	Bad Blood (1998)

Professional ratings
Review scores
Source	Rating
AllMusic	3/5 stars

Under the Skin is the debut album of Ice, released in 1993 through Pathological Records.

== Track listing ==
All tracks are written by Ice.

No.	Title	Length
1.	"Juggernaut Kiss"	7:40
2.	"Survival of the Fattest"	5:59
3.	"Out of Focus"	9:53
4.	".357 Magnum Is a Monster"	7:51
5.	"Skyscraper"	8:16
6.	"The Flood"	6:12
7.	"Stick Insect"	7:29
8.	"Implosion"	10:15
9.	"The Swimmer"	13:28

== Accolades ==
Year	Publication	Country	Accolade	Rank
1993	Mojo	United Kingdom	"Albums of the Year"	15
1995	Alternative Press	United States	"Top 99 of '85 to '95"	97
"*" denotes an unordered list.

== Personnel ==
Ice

- Justin Broadrick – guitar, drum machine
- Dave Cochrane – bass guitar
- John Jobbagy – drums
- Kevin Martin – tenor saxophone, sampler, vocals, production

Production and additional personnel

- Alex Buess – tenor saxophone on "Juggernaut Kiss" and "Survival of the Fattest" and engineering on all tracks
- Tony Cousins – mastering
- Jon Wakelin – recording
