= Gyatso (album) =

Studio album by 16-17
- Released: May 10, 1994
- Recorded: 1994
- Genre: Industrial, punk jazz
- Length: 62:21
- Label: Pathological / Big Cat / Savage Land
- Producer: Kevin Martin

16-17 chronology
When All Else Fails... (2005)	Gyatso (1994)	Human Distortion (1998)

Gyatso is the final studio album by industrial punk jazz band 16-17, released on May 10, 1994 by Pathological Records and Big Cat Records, re-released by Savage Land 2008.

== Reception ==
Professional ratings
Review scores
Source	Rating
AllMusic	4/5 stars

AllMusic staff writer William York calls Gyatso a "a take-no-prisoners piece of industrial hardcore jazz".

== Track listing ==
All tracks composed by Alex Buess, Markus Kneubuehler and Knut Remond (16-17)

No.	Title	Length
1.	"Attack->Impulse"	6:31
2.	"Intravenous"	5:26
3.	"Vertebrae"	5:01
4.	"Fall Of The West"	2:58
5.	"Black And Blue"	6:23
6.	"Two Way Mirror"	4:03
7.	"The Trawler"	5:59
8.	"Motor"	6:26
9.	"Flamethrower"	2:51
10.	"Solo"	3:28
11.	"White Out"	3:08
12.	"The Trawler (Dredged Up Mix)"	4:06
13.	"Motor (Alien Body Mix)"	6:34

== Personnel ==
Adapted from the Gyatso liner notes.

16-17

- Alex Buess – saxophones, bassclarinet, electronics
- Knut Remond – drums, percussion
- Markus Kneubühler – guitar, synths

Additional musicians and production

- Kevin Martin – production, samples
- G.C.Green – bass
- Tony Cousins – mastering (1993)
- Weasel Walter – mastering (2008)
- The Pathological Puppy – front cover design
- The RGB Design – layout
- Jon Wakelin – engineering
- Manuel Liebeskind – engineering
- Jason Pettigrew – liner notes

== Release history ==
Region	Date	Label	Format	Catalog
Europe	1994	Big Cat	CD	PATH 12
Europe	2008	Savage Land	CD	SL 06
Europe	2021	Praxis	LP	Praxis 59
