= The Anatomy of Addiction =

Studio album by God
- Released: 5 May 1994
- Recorded: 1994
- Genres: Industrial metal; experimental rock; industrial; avant-garde; avant-garde metal
- Length: 79:04
- Label: Big Cat
- Producer: Kevin Martin

God chronology
Consumed (1993)	The Anatomy of Addiction (1994)	Appeal to Human Greed (1995)

Professional ratings
Review scores
Source	Rating
Allmusic	3/5 stars
Robert Christgau	(neither)

The Anatomy of Addiction is the second and final studio album by the experimental rock band God, released on 5 May 1994 by Big Cat Records.

== Reception ==
Allmusic staff writer Ned Raggett gave the record three stars, calling it a "fantastic listen" and "a good way for the band to go".

== Accolades ==
Year	Publication	Country	Accolade	Rank
1994	The Wire	United Kingdom	"Albums of the Year"	*
"*" denotes an unordered list.

== Track listing ==
No.	Title	Length
1.	"On All Fours"	4:38
2.	"Body Horror"	5:35
3.	"Tunnel"	6:22
4.	"Lazarus"	7:30
5.	"Voodoo Head Blows"	4:46
6.	"Bloodstream"	10:39
7.	"Driving the Demons Out"	6:50
8.	"White Pimp Cut Up"	8:49
9.	"Gold Teeth"	5:39
10.	"Detox"	18:12

== Personnel ==
Adapted from The Anatomy of Addiction liner notes.

God

- Justin Broadrick – guitar
- Lou Ciccotelli – drums, percussion
- Dave Cochrane – bass guitar
- John Edwards – double bass
- Tim Hodgkinson – saxophone
- Gary Jeff – bass guitar
- Scott Kiehl – percussion
- Kevin Martin – vocals, saxophone, sampler, production
- Russell Smith – guitar

Additional musicians and production

- Alex Buess – clarinet, mixing
- Tony Cousins – mastering
- The Pathological Puppy – front cover design
- Tom Prentice – viola
- The RGB Design – layout
- Jon Wakelin – engineering

== Release history ==
Region	Date	Label	Format	Catalog
United Kingdom	1994	Big Cat	CD, LP	ABB62
