= Lou Ciccotelli =

American Drummer

- Genres: Post-rock; industrial rock
- Occupation: Musician
- Instrument: Drums
- Years active: 1989–present
- Label: Too Pure

Lou Ciccotelli is an American drummer from Chicago, who drummed for multiple British post-rock projects including God, Ice, Laika and Eardrum in the 1990s.

== Biography ==
Lou Ciccotelli was a founding member of the noise rock group Drunk Tank, but parted with them after recording their two singles in 1989. The same year he briefly became a member of the industrial rock act Slab! shortly before they disbanded.

He later joined God, an industrial metal ensemble with free jazz leanings founded by British musician Kevin Martin. He recorded two studio albums with the band, Possession in 1992 and The Anatomy of Addiction in 1994, along with several live albums and EPs. He collaborated again with Martin on Bad Blood, an industrial hip hop project issued under the name Ice in 1998.

He began recording with the ambient pop band Laika in 1994, first appearing on the EP Antenna and then on their full-length debut album Silver Apples of the Moon. He subsequently performed on all four of Laika's studio albums until the band dissolved.

== Discography ==
Year	Artist	Album	Label
1988	SLAB!	Sanity Allergy	Ink
1992	God	Possession	Virgin
1994	God	The Anatomy of Addiction	Big Cat
1994	Laika	Silver Apples of the Moon	Too Pure
1996	Gary Smith	Stereo	Chronoscope
1997	Laika	Sounds of the Satellites	Too Pure
1998	Ice	Bad Blood	Morpheus
1998	Mass	Mass	Paratactile
1999	Rhys Chatham	Hard Edge	Morpheus
1999	Mass	From Zero	The Wire Editions
2000	Laika	Good Looking Blues	Too Pure
2001	Eardrum	Side Effects	The Leaf
2003	Laika	Wherever I Am I Am What Is Missing	Too Pure
2007	Klima	Klima	Peacefrog
2013	Dragline Speedway	Black Thunder	Gibbon Envy
