= Dave Cochrane (musician) =

English bassist

- Genres: Industrial, noise rock
- Occupation: Musician
- Instrument: Bass guitar
- Years active: 1986–present
- Label: Blast First

Dave Cochrane is an English bassist that founded noise rock band Head of David. He has also collaborated with Justin Broadrick and Kevin Martin on several occasions.

In later years he has played in the last two albums of the industrial psychedelic band Terminal Cheesecake and the noise metal outfit Bruxa Maria. He has now formed a project with drummer Sned (founder of Flat Earth Records that played at some point in Doom, Oi Polloi and War All The Time among others) called Hollow Eyes

== Biography ==
Dave Cochrane joined the noise rock group Head of David after having played with Mick Harris in the punk band Anorexia. After leaving Head Of David in 1989, he formed Sweet Tooth with former Slab! drummer Scott Kiehl. Justin Broadrick joined them on guitar and the trio recorded one EP for Earache Records before disbanding. He has collaborated with British musician Kevin Martin and played and recorded with God and Ice, Techno Animal and Jesu. He has been part of the noise metal outfit Bruxa Maria and Terminal Cheesecake.

== Discography ==
Year	Artist	Album	Label
1986	Head of David	LP	Blast First
1988	Head of David	Dustbowl	Blast First
1992	God	Possession	Virgin
1993	Ice	Under the Skin	Pathological
1994	God	The Anatomy of Addiction	Big Cat
1997	The Bug	Tapping the Conversation	WordSound
1998	Ice	Bad Blood	Morpheus
2008	Transitional	Nothing Real Nothing Absent	Conspiracy
2009	Transitional	Stomach of the Sun	Conspiracy
2009	Greymachine	Disconnected	Hydra Head
2013	Dragline Speedway	Black Thunder	Gibbon Envy
2013	Fire Pariah	Fire Pariah	Gibbon Envy
2013	Transitional	Dark Matter Communion	Avalanche
