= Good Looking Blues =

Studio album by Laika
- Released: 28 February 2000
- Genre: Trip hop
- Length: 55:10
- Label: Too Pure
- Producer: Margaret Fiedler; Guy Fixsen

Laika chronology
Sounds of the Satellites (1997)	Good Looking Blues (2000)	Wherever I Am I Am What Is Missing (2003)

Singles from Good Looking Blues
- 1. "Uneasy" Released: 2000; 2. "Black Cat Bone" Released: 2000; 3. "Badtimes" Released: 2000

Good Looking Blues is the third studio album by British band Laika. It was released through Too Pure on 28 February 2000. The album peaked at number 37 on the UK Independent Albums Chart.

== Critical reception ==
Professional ratings
Aggregate scores
Source	Rating
Metacritic	82/100
Review scores
Source	Rating
AllMusic	3.5/5 stars
Alternative Press	4/5
The Guardian	3/5 stars
The List	4/5 stars
Muzik	4/5 stars
NME	7/10
Pitchfork	7.5/10
Select	4/5
Uncut	4/5 stars
Wall of Sound	78/100

At Metacritic, which assigns a weighted average score out of 100 to reviews from mainstream critics, Good Looking Blues received an average score of 82 based on 8 reviews, indicating "universal acclaim".

Amy Schroeder of AllMusic wrote, "even though you wouldn't call the sound upbeat, it is indeed mesmerizing, tranquil, and head-bobbing." Lydia Vanderloo of CMJ New Music Monthly said: "As on previous efforts, the songs here share an aggressive rhythmic undertow that's equal parts dub and trip-hop."

== Track listing ==
All tracks are written by Margaret Fiedler and Guy Fixsen

No.	Title	Length
1.	"Black Cat Bone"	4:24
2.	"Moccasin"	4:31
3.	"T. Street"	6:10
4.	"Uneasy"	4:57
5.	"Good Looking Blues"	5:45
6.	"Widow's Weed"	7:46
7.	"Glory Cloud"	3:44
8.	"Go Fish"	4:35
9.	"Badtimes"	4:51
10.	"Knowing Too Little"	8:27
Total length:		55:10

Japanese / US edition bonus tracks
No.	Title	Length
11.	"Lie Low"	4:40
12.	"A Single Word"	5:02
Total length:		64:52

== Charts ==
Chart (2000)	Peak position
UK Independent Albums (OCC)	37
