= Lonelady =

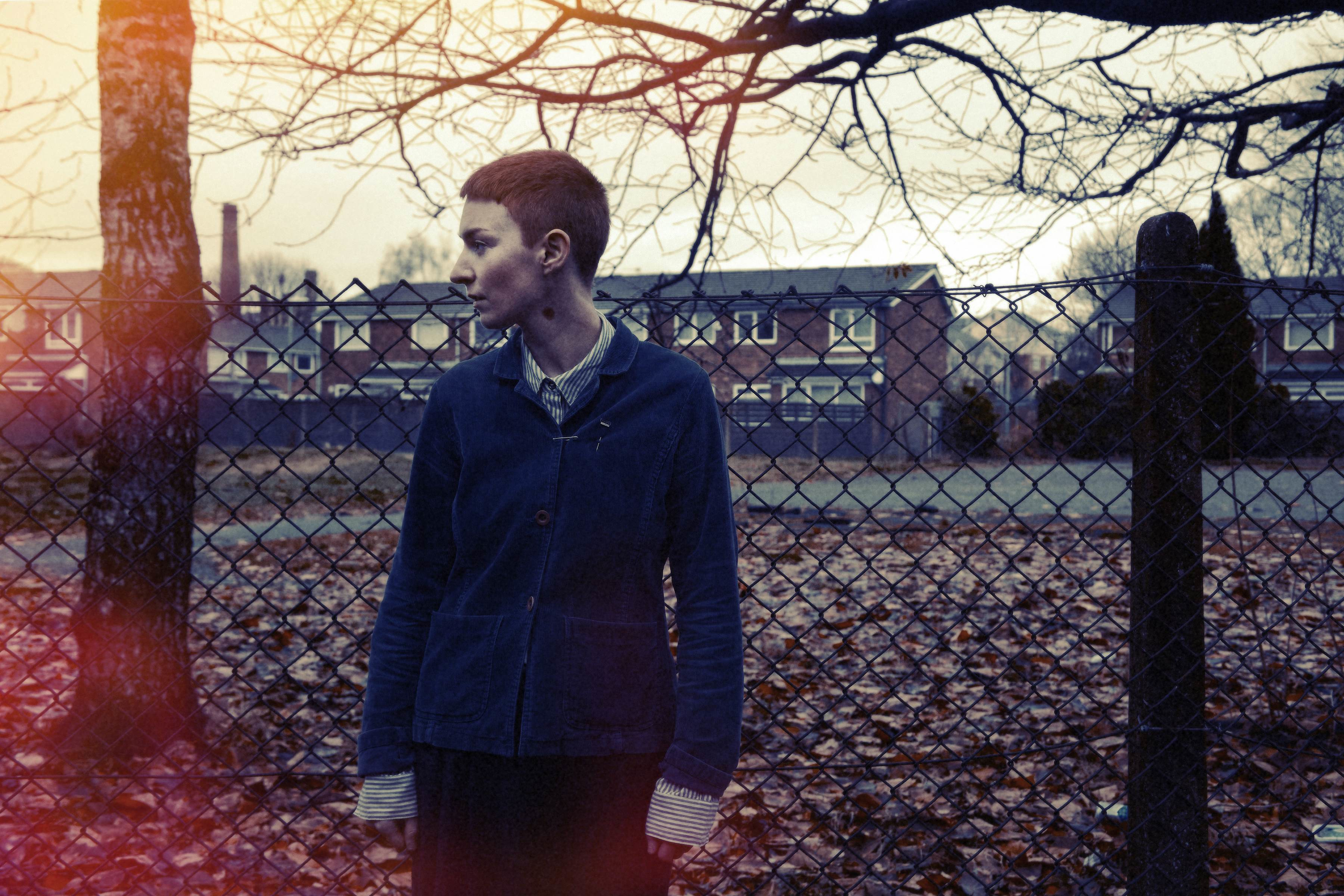

Background information
- Born: Julie Campbell
- Genre: Post-punk
- Occupations: solo artist, singer, songwriter, producer
- Instruments: Guitar, vocals, synths, cello, sampler, bass, electronic drums
- Years active: 2007–present
- Labels: Warp, Too Pure

Julie Campbell, known as LoneLady, is a music artist from Manchester, England, influenced by the post-punk era, but later integrating dance and funk influences. She first started making music on a 4-track cassette recorder in her towerblock flat in Manchester while completing a Fine Art degree. Her stark, early first gigs featured Campbell alone playing electric guitar along to a drum machine. She would later have a 4-piece live band, however.

Campbell came to the attention of Warp who signed her in 2009. Her first album, Nerve Up, was released in 2010 to widespread critical acclaim. NME called it a "unique, brilliant debut ... we should celebrate LoneLady as the arrival of a fresh and invigorating voice whose talent transcends time and space and influence"; it also drew praise from music journalist Paul Morley.

Campbell's music is characterised by a lo-fi, economical approach; she has said that "Working with basic tools, mainly an 8-track cassette recorder, a telecaster and a drum machine forced me to be economical and inventive, and set an aesthetic blueprint for the way I like to work, to keep things stark and urgent."

Inspired by psychogeography, with dance and funk influences coming to the fore, Campbell's second album Hinterland was released in 2015, also to widespread critical acclaim. The Quietus called it a "vibrant and urgent combination of genealogy and vision – and it is this that truly makes it a masterpiece." All four singles released from Hinterland reached the 'A' Playlist on BBC 6 Music; Campbell also received a Sky Arts nomination for Best Breakthrough Artist.

== History ==
Julie Campbell was born in Ashton-under-Lyne and grew up in Audenshaw, an area in East Manchester. Since the age of 18 she has lived just outside Manchester's city centre. Her early lo-fi home recordings were released on CDR and 7-inch via small local label Filthy Home Recordings.

She came to the attention of Warp, signing with them in 2009. Nerve Up (2010) was recorded in a crumbling room of a mill in Miles Platting, a run-down area of East Manchester, co-produced by Campbell and Guy Fixsen (Laika, My Bloody Valentine). The room was purpose built using breeze-blocks and salvaged scrap. Campbell's love of raw industrial spaces has been present from day one, infiltrating into her psyche and her music, and this has also meant a tendency to avoid professional recording studios.

For her live shows, Campbell arranges parts and shows her musicians what to play. Campbell toured Nerve Up in the UK and Europe, which included a support tour with art-pop pioneers Wire. After touring Campbell contributed vocals and guitar to various other projects. Due to these projects and fluctuating management, it would be 2015 before Campbell's second album Hinterland appeared, a delay that Campbell is unhappy about.

Hinterland (Warp, 2015) is driven by Campbell's increasing interest in psychogeography and Brutalist architecture. "It seems like these places reflect a part of me; that I belong there..there’s a communication...walking in these places feels a little bit ritualistic. Its about what surrounds you every day, transforming the unremarkable and derelict into something that has magic and meaning." Landscapes obsess Hinterland - the word itself translates as "the land behind" or "unknown region" - every song is about a landscape of one kind or another; Mancunian wildernesses, childhood playspaces, the landscape of the mind.

The 6-minute-long dance-influenced "Groove It Out" was released on 12-inch and download November 2014 and featured a remix by Ekoplekz. The second single "Bunkerpop" was released in February 2015 on 12-inch and download and featured a remix by Wrangler.

Campbell's second album Hinterland was released in 2015. More rhythm-oriented, the songs are longer, with simple drum machine at its core, setting up the groove. Embellished with Campbell's intricate and propulsive guitar playing and various instruments including electronic drums, cello and clavinet, Hinterland expands Campbell's previously stark approach into more colourful dimensions, and shows funk and dance influences coming to the fore. Campbell plays all instruments except real drums and she recorded, mixed and produced Hinterland to near-completion in Concrete Retreat, her home studio.

"I recorded and mixed the songs in my home studio using a Tascam 8-track cassette recorder and Garageband. During this process it became clear that these recordings had an intimacy and integrity of their own; and I felt it was unnecessary to try and re-create an arid facsimile in professional studio." - Campbell. Though the songs were, essentially finished, Campbell travelled to Keyclub Recording Co, an analogue recording studio in an industrial region in Michigan, for some finishing touches. Working with Bill Skibbe, a layer of real drums and Linn LM-1 drums were added, together with a few subtle processes to add an additional depth of tone and character.

In July 2015, Campbell was invited by The Barbican, London, to be part of Station To Station, a month-long live art happening, where Campbell continued her ongoing explorations about concrete and its effects on the psyche. In a week long-studio residency open to the public, this featured a modular synth tutorial by Ben Edwards (John Foxx, Wrangler), an on-site 12-inch vinyl pressing of new song "Fear Colours", and culminated in a performance in the gallery space accompanied by wrap-around audio-visual projections.

Throughout 2015, Campbell invited Stephen Mallinder (founder member of Cabaret Voltaire) along on tour in the UK and Europe, to play a series of guest DJ sets. In October 2015, LoneLady shared the bill with Factory Floor at Abbeydale Picturehouse, a crumbling former cinema, for Sensoria 2015, an annual festival in Sheffield named after a Cabaret Voltaire song.

== Discography ==
=== Albums ===
- Nerve Up (2010, Warp)
- Hinterland (2015, Warp)
- Former Things (2021, Warp)

=== Singles ===
- "Immaterial" (Warp, 2009)
- "Intuition" (Warp, 2010)
- "Groove It Out" (Warp, 2014)
- "Bunkerpop" (Warp, 2015)
- "Hinterland" (Warp, 2015)
- "Silvering" (Warp, 2015)
- "(There is) No Logic" (Warp, 2021)
