= Ulrike Gabriel =

German artist and researcher focussing on generative systems

Ulrike Gabriel was born in 1964 in Munich. She is an artist, researcher and curator focussing on generative systems. Ulrike co-founded the laboratory Codelab, Berlin where she spent some time as a director. She also worked in ecological agriculture in Argentina from 2003 to 2006. Ulrike was a professor and head of the teaching area Electronic Media at the Hochschule für Gestaltung Offenbach am Main (2006-2012). She studied philosophy at LMU Munich from 1983 to 1985 and painting and applied graphics at the Academy of Fine Arts from 1985-1991 in Munich. After that she was a post-graduate at the Institute for New Media at the Städelschule, Frankfurt (1991-1992) and a research fellow at the Academy of Media Arts Cologne, department for media science (1996-1998).

== Works ==
Gabriel explores human reality while her work includes robotics, some Virtual Reality (VR) work, installations, performative formats and painting.

Perceptual Arena is an interactive and immersive Virtual Reality installation developed by Ulrike Gabriel and otherspace in 1993 for the exhibition Artlab3, Hillside Plaza, Tokyo. This work has been further shown at V2 Exhibition Rotterdam, Le Manege Sallestrau Maubeuge, the Voyages Virtuales exhibitions in Paris, and at the Serious Chiller Lounge in Munich. Perceptual Arena is a realtime virtual environment that explores what the mind can do. This creates an audio-visual space texture that has the interaction of the user as an important attribute. The interaction is simply to be in the space, to distinguish it and to move around and to grab on to the resulting virtual clay. This defines the space and is what's used for the further interaction. The space matches the individual perception. The perceivable evolves through perception of it. To be involved and possibly mess up in this process can transform the world, but can also push it out of balance and therefore destroy. The use of polygons and sounds is created and always changing by the personal views. The viewer is the only thing that can manipulate what is happening. The complexity of the arena world results out of the total interrelation of all its factors which in the end all depend on the users input data. These are some things the viewers might encounter. The view onto the space, their movement in the space, a history of movement and view, a virtual sensor in the field of view which applies history onto the space, the total access with a data glove onto the space through the field of view, and the virtual clay which is object and result of all this factors.

In another work called Breath that she developed in 1991 during a residency at german helicopterlab the human breath is explored. There are sensors used in this project on the belt they wear that regulates breathing. The people who use these belts can alter the dynamics of the sounds being duplicated around them. The breathing causes the polygons in the computer-generated image to fluctuate. It is said that the more you breath regularly, the more complicated and disorganized the visual and acoustic processes become. Ulrike Gabriel creates a complicated system of biofeedback that goes beyond normal relationships between action and reaction. The way interaction with human beings is being used is something that is explored way beyond a normal mind. Gabriel is using her mind to go beyond the depths and think outside the box. The way breath in this project is being used is connected with virtual space in which the spectator experiences in a cybernetic world presenting images how breath mechanism can be linked with time. In the picture system, there are 400 polygons in the hyperplane that can move.

The technology used for this project is beyond our days. So to start out a participant stands in front of a big screen wearing a sensor belt around the waist. The sensor detects amplitude of the lung and abdominal muscles in breathing. So because of that action the data is fed to a computer. When it first starts out regularly grid-shaped CG polygons, subdivided in small pieces, are projected on the screen. As the data of the magnitude of breathing are sent in, parts of the cellular texture start to develop in real-time. When breathing is at a stable pitch the polygons begin to transform drastically. When solidity is gone and pitches move back and forth, polygons calm down as if they were going back to the beginning stage. Looking at his visualized breathing, the participant finds it difficult to continue to breathe calmly. Gabriel presents that automatic physical functions such as breathing are actually automaton controlling us. It is said that a mechanical autonomous environment contradicts human consciousness. She regards human body as an accumulation of complex data, and tries to interface human body with computer in a paradoxical association.

Gabriel created 1993 Terrain_01, 1996 Barriere and 1997 Terrain_02, a series of installations where the motion of a colony of solar-powered robots is controlled by the viewer's brain waves.

In 2001 she developed the Oskarine, a software project that dealt with the poetic work of Oskar Pastior (1927-2006). 2002 she founded the flow ensemble that was on tour in the netherlands 2002.
