= Margaret Fiedler McGinnis =

American musician

- Origin: Chicago, Illinois, United States
- Genres: Indie electronic; dream pop; post-rock
- Occupations: Musician; rights administrator; craftsperson
- Instruments: Vocals; guitar; cello; keyboards; sampler
- Labels: Too Pure; American Recordings
- Website: Official website

Margaret Fiedler McGinnis (née Fiedler) is a London-based American vocalist, multi-instrumentalist and sculptor. She is best known as a founding member of UK indie groups Moonshake and Laika, as live guitarist with PJ Harvey and Wire and as the owner/operative of Mineral Point Music Ltd. In 2025 she completed the MA Sculpture programme at the Royal College of Art.

== Early life ==
Margaret Fiedler was born in Chicago, Illinois, United States, and grew up in Winnetka, Illinois and later in Connecticut. She was educated at Sarah Lawrence College and at Trinity College, Dublin.

She had attended grade school in Winnetka and played the cello growing up. McGinnis formed Child's Play with Moby as a high school band.

== Career ==
After a move to London, England, McGinnis formed Moonshake in 1991 with David Callahan, formerly of The Wolfhounds. She and Callahan shared vocals, guitar, sampling and songwriting duties, and the band was augmented by John Frenett (bass) and Mig Morland (drums, percussion). Moonshake were signed to Alan McGee's Creation Records for their debut First EP released in Spring 1991. The group then moved to Too Pure Records, and released the Secondhand Clothes EP and the Eva Luna LP in 1992, and the mini-album Big Good Angel in 1993.

In 1993, McGinnis and Frenett split away from Moonshake to form Laika with engineer/musician Guy Fixsen (who'd engineered and co-produced Moonshake's recordings), flautist Louise Elliott and drummers Lou Ciccotelli and Rob Ellis. The band, increasingly centred around McGinnis and Fixsen, produced four albums (Silver Apples of the Moon, Sound of the Satellites, Good Looking Blues and Wherever I Am, I Am What is Missing) and five singles for Too Pure between 1994 and 2003, following which the band went on what became a permanent hiatus.

In 2000, while still with Laika, McGinnis joined PJ Harvey's live band to play lead guitar, cello, keyboards and percussion on the world tour for "Stories from the City, Stories from the Sea" world tour. Following Laika's last album in 2003, she studied at the College of Law where she received a post-graduate law qualification. After graduation, she took a job at the BBC in 2006, working in the music copyright field.

In 2008, McGinnis took a break from the BBC to join post-punk pioneers Wire, replacing Bruce Gilbert on guitar for an ongoing world-wide tour. After the tour she resumed work at the BBC until 2011, followed by music-licensing stints at Antenna International, Remedy Productions and Paramount (covering all music rights issues for MTV music-based programmes produced in the United Kingdom). Between 2008 and 2010, she had a parallel career working as a candle maker and aromatherapy instructor at The Make Lounge between 2008 and, using vintage teacups and environmentally friendly materials.

In 2015, McGinnis opened up a Twitter account for a new band project called Pea but the account didn't witness any further updates. In 2016, she set up the full rights clearance/music supervision service Mineral Point Music Ltd.

McGinnis returned to a more active musical career following the COVID-19 pandemic lockdown. In 2023, a Pea homepage was set up announcing that music would be released the same year, with McGinnis declaring "new music coming soon... old music coming soon - 2023 is year of rabbits, lots of rabbits..." This page later disappeared from the internet, superseded by a dedicated Margaret Fiedler McGinnis homepage which did not mention the Pea project.

McGinnis' current homepage and her LinkedIn page note that she has been composing for television and film, as well as working on several other musical projects, including a "silent field recording project/homage" called Recording the Dead and a "secret" project provisionally called October First. She has also been half of Earthworm, a collaboration with musician/sound artist Christie Denton: the first fruit of this collaboration was a graphic score for "reactive electronics, guitar, and other elements (including) the musicians' own heartbeats and other organic rhythms" called "SPRINGS", which was performed at the Le Non_Jazz:: concert evening in Paris on 5 March 2024.

== Personal life ==
Prior to her marriage, and while still known as Margaret Fiedler, McGinnis was in a romantic and domestic relationship with her Laika partner Guy Fixsen from the early 1990s until the early 2000s. She began using her married surname "McGinnis" from the mid-to-late 2000s.

McGinnis is an animal-rights supporter.
