= God (British band) =

British industrial band

- Origin: London, England, UK
- Genres: Industrial metal, noise rock, free jazz, experimental
- Years active: 1987–1996
- Labels: Big Cat, Virgin
- Past members: Steve Blake; Justin Broadrick; Lou Ciccotelli; Dave Cochrane; John Edwards; Tim Hodgkinson; Gary Jeff; Scott Kiehl; Kevin Martin; Shaun Rogan; Russell Smith; Simon Picard; Niko Wenner

God (stylised in all caps) were a British experimental band formed in London by Kevin Martin. The band's first official release was 'Sounds Like Thunder' in 1988, for a Mark E. Smith-curated 'Disparate Cognescenti' compilation. The band expanded to include nine members and released two studio albums before disbanding in 1996. The group's abrasive combination of ambient, dub, free jazz and noise rock music garnered respect from their peers such as Bill Laswell, Ministry, My Bloody Valentine, J. G. Thirlwell and John Zorn.

== History ==
God originally consisted of Kevin Martin on tenor saxophone and vocals and Nigel Armstrong on guitar. The pairing came together after the pair, along with Andy Rendall (Admass) relocated from Weymouth to London, and Fall frontman Mark E. Smith asked Martin if he wanted to contribute to Smith's 1988 Disparate Cognescenti compilation. In late 1988, Martin met Justin Broadrick, whose project Godflesh he had heard on John Peel's Radio 1 show. Broadrick began working with Martin and served as a producer for God's early releases before joining as a member.

== Discography ==
Studio albums

- Possession (1992, Virgin)
- The Anatomy of Addiction (1994, Big Cat)

Live albums

- Loco (1991, Pathological)
- Consumed (1993, Sentrax)

Singles and EPs

- Breach Birth (1990, Situation Two)
- Car First (1990, Clawfist) a split 7-inch with Terminal Cheesecake
- Appeal to Human Greed (1995, Big Cat)
