= Alex Buess =

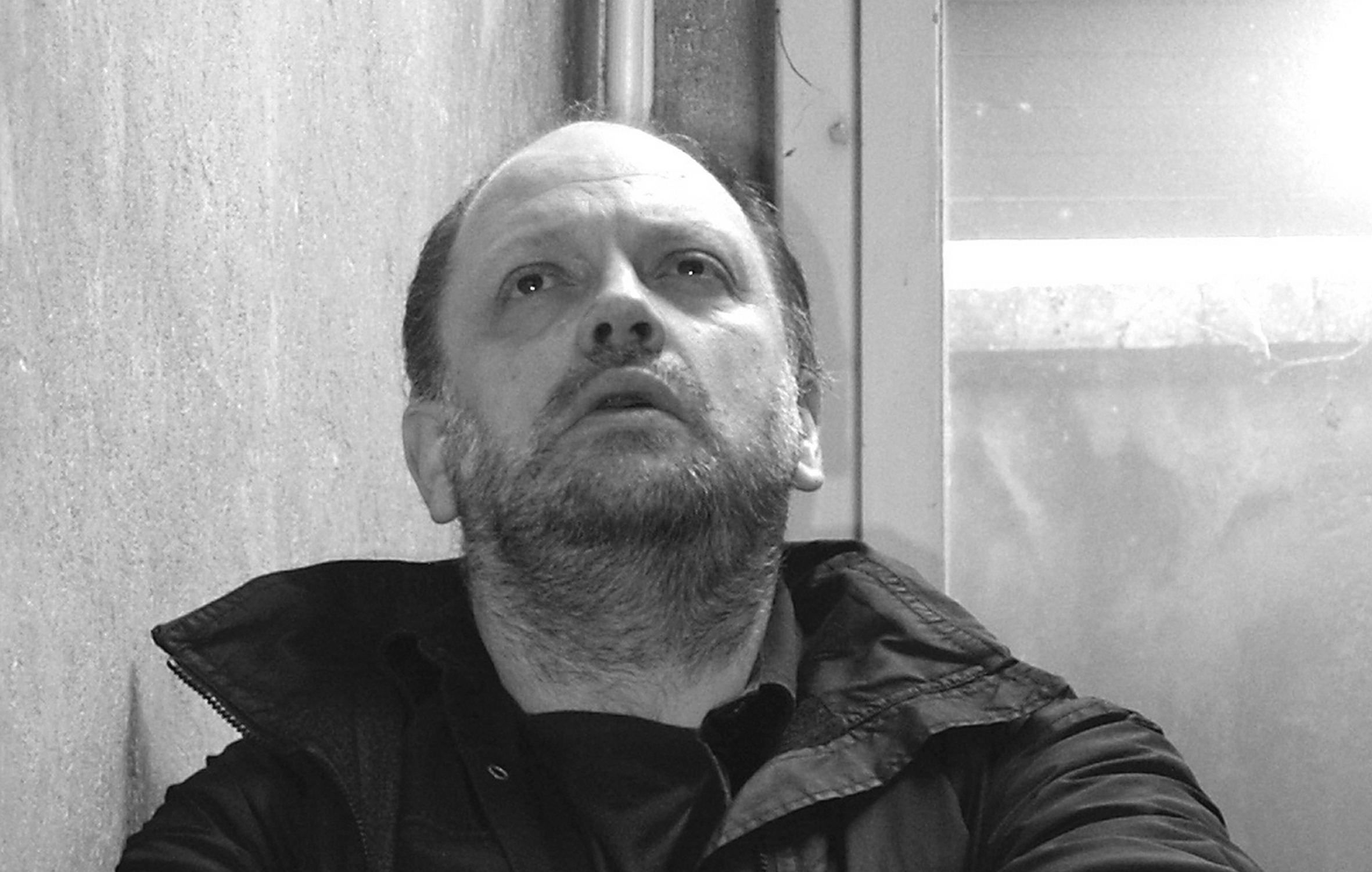
- Born: 1954 (age 71–72); Basel, Switzerland
- Occupations: Composer; Saxophone player; Producer
- Organizations: 16-17, Ice, God

Alex Buess is a Swiss composer, saxophone player, producer and sound artist born in 1954 in Basel (CH).

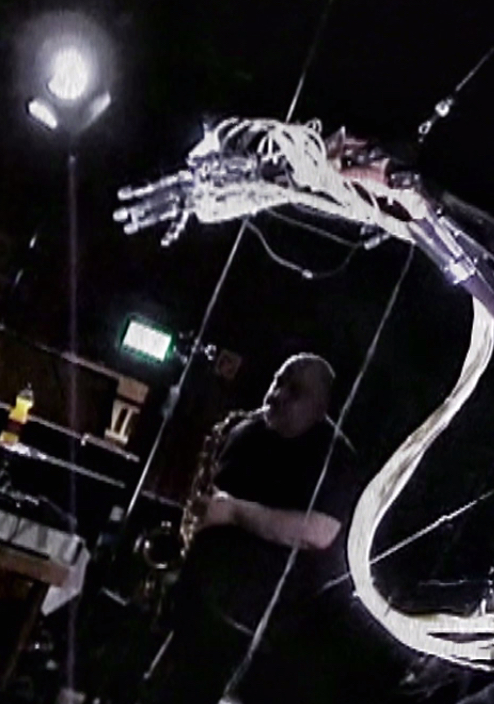
At the JOLT Festival 2011

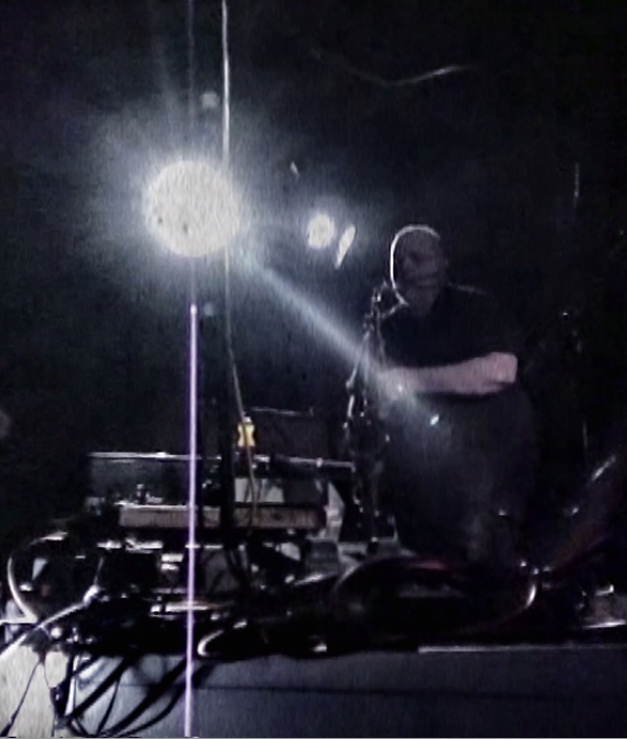
At the JOLT Festival 2011

== Biography ==
He collaborates (has collaborated) with Stephan Wittwer, Paul Schütze, Kevin Martin, Peter Brötzmann, William Parker, Raoul Björkenheim, Toshinori Kondo, Bill Laswell, Kevin Shields (My Bloody Valentine), Tim Hodgkinson, Michael Wertmüller, Daniel Buess and many other musicians in the wide field of improvisation, electronics, electroacoustic music and composition. He plays/played in the groups ICE, God, Phantom City, The Bug, Sprawl, Cortex and his own group 16-17

Buess has written compositions for various contemporary music ensembles such as e. g. the Ensemble Modern, the Xasax Saxophone Quartett Paris or the Ensemble Phoenix Basel and also works as a producer and sound engineer. His compositions are performed in Europe and throughout the world. Several of his works have been commissioned by well known music festivals.

Buess`s compositions are characterized by dense layers of sound, polyrhythmic and microrhythmic structures. He has a penchant for using acoustic instruments as well as electroacoustic tools to amplify and alienate the original sounds resulting in compositions characterized by textural density and huge impact

Alex Buess has received various prizes and sabbatical years including those offered by the Musikkreditkommission of Basel City in 1992 and the Robert Thyll-Dürr Foundation in 1998. His studies include electronics, acoustics, musicology, phonetics, semantics and composition.

He has appeared at various international festivals including Huddersfield Contemporary Music Festival (England), Rostrum for Electroacoustic Music (Austrian / Swiss contribution 1997 Radio DRS 2), Tampere Festival (Finland), Musique Action Vandœuvres-les-Nancy (France), Taktlos 1993/95/96/2003 (CH), Tonart Festival 2000 (CH), Festival de Musica Contemporanea in Quito (Ecuador), and the Encuentro de Compositores Bolivianos in Sucre (Bolivia), Lucerne Festival (2005), Warsaw Autumn (2006), Donaueschingen Music Festival (2007), Tage für Neue Musik Zürich(2013) and various concerts and festivals in Japan, Australia and China.

Buess’s work reflects his experience with electronic technology, written contemporary music, film music, new mixing and production techniques and computer music.

== Discography (selection) ==
- Ice with Kevin Martin, Dave Cochrane, John Jobaggy, Justin Broadrick and Alex Buess. Title:Under The Skin. Label: Pathological GB (1993)
- Sprawl with Michael Wertmüller, Peter Brötzmann, Alex Buess, Stephan Wittwer and William Parker. Label: Trost, A (1997)
- 16-17, title: Gyatso, Label: Pathological GB (1993), Reedition 2008: Savageland Records
- God, title: The Anatomy of Addiction, Label: Big Cat GB, USA (1994)
- The Bug, title: Tapping the Conversation with Kevin Martin, Dave Cochrane, Simon Hopkins, Label: Wordsound USA (1995)
- Phantom City, title: Site Anubis with Paul Schütze, Raoul Björkenheim, Alex Buess, LolCoxhill, Bill Laswell and Dirk Wachtelaer, Label: Big Cat GB (1996)
- Phantom City, title: Shiva Recoil: Live/Unlive at the Tampere Jazzfestival, Finland. Label: Virgin UK (1997)
- Xasax Saxophon quartet: composition: Hyperbaton, CD Erol 7019 by Xasax. Works by Donatoni, Xenakis, Cage, Aperghis, Wolpe, Buess, Essel und Rzewski.
- Ensemble Phoenix Basel, title: Repulsion: compositions: Maxwell’s Demon and Parallaxe A, United Phoenix Records 001. Works by Dror Feiler, Tim Hodgkinson and Alex Buess.

== Chamber music scores (selection) ==
- Ata-7 for saxophone, live-electronics and percussion
- Khat for bass-flute, percussion and live-electronics
- Parallaxe A for large ensemble and 5-channeltape
- X_Syn_Drome_1 for soprano, perkussion, live-electronics and tape
- Metatron's cube for clarinet, trombone, amplified violin, amplified violoncello, amplified doublebass and percussion
- Phylum for solo perkussion, solo electronics, large ensemble and live-electronics
- Ghosts of Schizophonia for double ensemble and live-electronics
