= Panorama Music Festival =

Music festival in New York City

- Status: Defunct
- Genre: Rock, alternative rock, indie, hip hop, R&B, funk, EDM, Americana.
- Locations: Randall's Island; 20 Randall's Island Park; New York, NY 10035, USA
- Years active: 2016–2018
- Inaugurated: July 22, 2016
- Founders: Goldenvoice
- Most recent: July 27, 2018
- Website: Panorama NYC Music Festival at the Wayback Machine (archived 24 December 2019)

The Panorama Music Festival (commonly referred to as Panorama) was a multi-day music festival held on Randall's Island in New York City. It was presented by Goldenvoice.

== History ==
Goldenvoice, the company behind Panorama, is a subsidiary of AEG Live. The same people who also produce Coachella Valley Music and Arts Festival, Rock on the Range and other festivals around the world.

The first Panorama took place in the summer of 2016 and was met with some controversy. Founder's Entertainment, the creators behind Governors Ball Music Festival, petitioned the city of New York and Mayor Bill de Blasio to have the dates of Panorama changed. Founder's Entertainment's major concern was that Panorama's ticket sales would cut into their own festival's. De Blasio obliged and the festival was moved to 7 weeks after Governors Ball, rather than the original 2 weeks, to avoid compromised ticket sales.

== Panorama 2016 ==
The inaugural Panorama was held July 22 through July 24. The weekend long festival hosted artists from various genres.

=== Lineup ===
==== Friday July 22nd ====
- Arcade Fire
- Alabama Shakes
- Major Lazer
- FKA Twigs
- Silversun Pickups
- Schoolboy Q
- Broken Social Scene
- DJ Khaled
- Mike D
- Lindsey Stirling
- Netsky (musician)
- Preservation Hall Jazz Band
- DJ Harvey
- Madlib
- Here We Go Magic
- White Lung
- Little Scream

==== Saturday July 23rd ====
- Kendrick Lamar
- The National (band)
- Sufjan Stevens
- Flosstradamus
- Blood Orange
- Foals (band)
- Daughter (band)
- Anderson Paak
- AlunaGeorge
- Jai Wolf
- Kaytranada
- Tokimonsta
- The Julie Ruin
- Oh Wonder
- Melanie Martinez (singer)
- Ex Hex (band)
- Aurora (singer)
- Horse meat disco
- Museum of Love
- Caveman (group)
- JDH & Dave P

==== Sunday July 24th ====
- LCD Soundsystem
- Sia
- ASAP Rocky
- Kurt Vile & The Violators
- Run the Jewels
- Grace Potter
- Rufus Du Sol
- Flatbush Zombies
- The Front Bottoms
- SZA (singer)
- Nathaniel Rateliff & the Night Sweats
- Holy Ghost!
- Tensnake
- Classixx
- Show Me The Body
- Prinze George
- The Black Madonna
- Lloydski

== Panorama 2017 ==
The festival's second year will take place July 28 through July 30.

=== Lineup ===
==== Friday July 28th ====
- Frank Ocean
- Solange Knowles
- MGMT
- Future Islands
- Tyler, The Creator
- Spoon
- Girl Talk
- DJ Shadow
- Vance Joy
- Isaiah Rashad
- MØ
- Breakbot
- Foxygen
- Marcellus Pittman
- Cherry Glazerr
- Honne
- 24 Hours
- Jamila Woods

==== Saturday July 29th ====
- Tame Impala
- Alt-J
- Nick Murphy
- Nicolas Jaar
- Belle and Sebastian
- Vince Staples
- Jagwar Ma
- Matoma
- Mitski
- Hot Since 82
- Sofi Tukker
- S U R V I V E
- THEY.
- Pinegrove
- Noname
- Bleached
- Huerco S.
- Anthony Naples
- Mister Saturday Night
- Jayda G

==== Sunday July 30th ====
- Nine Inch Nails
- A Tribe Called Quest
- Justice
- Glass Animals
- Cashmere Cat
- Angel Olsen
- Andrew McMahon
- Snakehips
- Kiiara
- Mura Masa
- Cloud Nothings
- Preoccupations
- Dhani Harrison
- Bishop Briggs
- 6LACK
- Towkio
- Tim Sweeney
- DJ Heather

== Panorama 2018 ==
=== Line-up ===
==== Friday July 27th ====
- The Weeknd
- Migos
- Father John Misty
- The War on Drugs
- Dua Lipa
- Jhené Aiko
- Daniel Caesar
- Charlotte Gainsbourg
- Sabrina Claudio
- The Black Madonna
- Soulection
- Yaeji
- Mall Grab
- Supa Bwe
- Mike Servito
- Turtle Bugg
- Bearcat

==== Saturday July 28th ====
- Janet Jackson
- SZA
- Lil Wayne (replaced Cardi B on the lineup)
- Gucci Mane
- St. Vincent
- PVRIS
- Japanese Breakfast
- Floating Points
- Sigrid
- Bicep
- Jay Som
- Kyle Hall
- Avalon Emerson
- Lo Moon
- DJ Python
- Kalin White
- Riobamba

==== Sunday July 29th ====
- The Killers
- The xx
- ODESZA
- David Byrne
- Fleet Foxes
- Greta Van Fleet
- Mount Kimbie
- Chicano Batman
- Nora En Pure
- Robert DeLong
- Moodymann
- Rex Orange County
- Shannon and the Clams
- Downtown Boys
- Helena Hauff
- Jlin
- Laurel Halo
- Shanti Celeste
- DJ Haram

== The Lab ==
The Lab, sponsored by Hewlett-Packard, is the festival's art component.

Exclusively featuring NYC artists, The Lab seeks to focus on experiential arts with an interactive space exhibition and a 360 virtual reality theater.

=== 2016 Artists ===
- Antfood
- Dave and Gabe
- Dirt Empire
- Emilie Baltz (& Philip Seirzega)
- Future Wife
- Gabriel Pulecio
- Invisible Light Network
- Red Paper Heart
- The Mountain Gods (Philip Sierzega & Charlie Whitney)
- VolvoxLabs
- Zach Lieberman

== Panorama 2019 and beyond ==
On January 18 2019, Billboard announced that Panorama Festival would not be returning in 2019.
