= Field Day (festival) =

Yearly outdoor music festival in London

Coordinates: 51°32′21″N 0°1′54″W

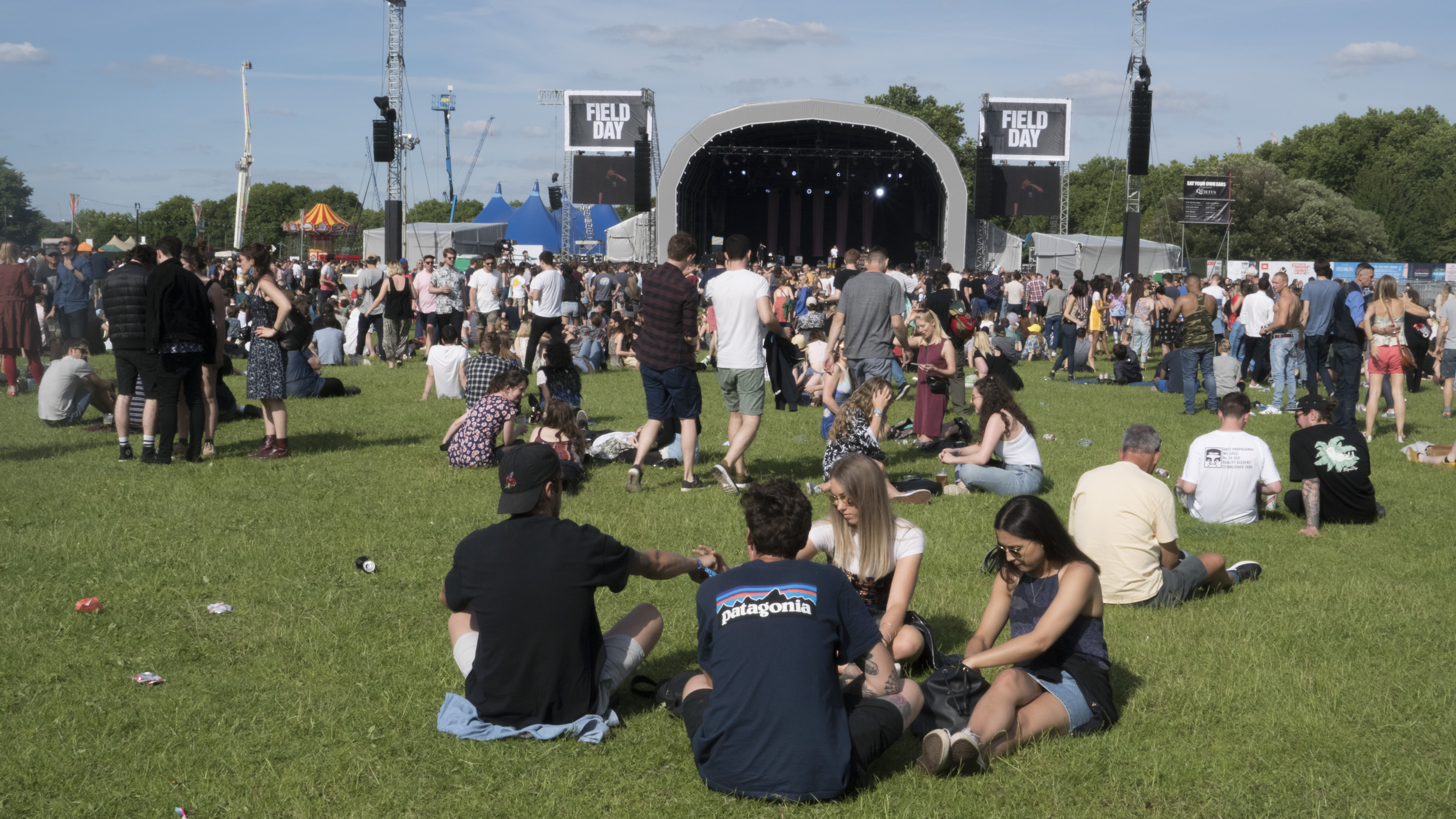
- Field Day 2017
- Genre: Electronic
- Dates: Saturday 24th May 2025
- Locations: Brockwell Park (2025) Victoria Park, London Borough of Tower Hamlets (2007–2017); Brockwell Park (2018); Meridian Water (2019)
- Years active: 2007 – present
- Founders: Tom Baker (Eat Your Own Ears) - (2007 - 2019) - and Marcus Weedon (Brockwell Live) (https://www.brockwell-live.com/)
- Capacity: 30,000
- Website: http://www.fielddayfestivals.com/

Field Day is a yearly outdoor music festival in London. It was first held in Victoria Park in the London Borough of Tower Hamlets on 11 August 2007 and returned there each year until 2017. The 2018 festival moved to Brockwell Park, and in 2019 it was held at Meridian Water in Enfield. Between 2021 and 2024 the festival returned to Victoria Park, and in 2025 it is to be held in Brockwell Park.

Beginning in 2021, the festival partnered with AEG's Goldenvoice, merging into All Points East.

In April 2023, the festival was acquired by Superstruct Entertainment.

== Village mentality ==
The festival once hosted an annual village fete titled Village Mentality. Beginning in 2008, the area includes a sack race, tug of war and egg and spoon race. In 2008, the events took place until 5pm, finishing earlier than the rest of the festival. In 2009, the area was extended to include its own musical line-up, playing on the Village Mentality Stage. Acts included Mumford & Sons, Toumani Diabaté and Malcolm Middleton. The area is handled by organiser Tom Baker's partner Natalie Silk. Village Mentality was formerly known as Homefires, the last Village Mentality at Field Day was in 2018

== Field Day radio ==
Field Day and Eat Your Own Ears founder Tom Baker, together with radio production company Folded Wing, recorded a series of radio shows in the run up to Field Day festival in 2012. It featured sessions and interviews with the performing artists and has been a regular feature of the festival since. Episodes included exclusives interviews and mixes from the likes of Pixies, Grimes, Solange, Mulatu Astatke, Panda Bear, Caribou, Omar Souleyman, Metronomy, John Cooper Clarke, Four Tet, Kurt Vile and many more.

== Lineups ==
=== 2007 festival ===
The inaugural Field Day festival took place on 11 August 2007, with the first Underage Festival taking place the same weekend. Over fifty artists featured across four stages, as well as a musical bandstand. Artists included the 1990s, Absentee, Adem, Alberta Cross, Andrew Weatherall, Archie Bronson Outfit, Bat for Lashes, Battles, Caribou, Casper C, The Cock N Bull Kid, Crispin Dior, El Plate, Electrelane, Erol Alkan, Euros Childs, Fanfarlo, Filthy Dukes, Florence and the Machine, Foals, Four Tet, Fridge, GoodBooks, Gruff Rhys, Hannah Holland, James Yorkston, Jo Jo de Freq, Justice, Kid Harpoon, Late of the Pier, Laura Marling, Liars, Matt Walsh, Matthew Dear, Miss Odd Kidd, Mystery Jets, Nadia Ksaiba, Patchwork Pirates, The Pictish Trail, Pull Tiger Tail, Skull Juice, The Aliens, The Concretes, The Earlies, The Lovely Jonjo, Vetiver, Warboy, White Rabbits, Young Turks and Zombie Disco Squad. Originally being billed as a capacity of 6,000, the amount was increased to 10,000 shortly before the festival.

=== 2008 festival ===
The 2008 event took place on 9 August 2008, with the Underage Festival taking place the previous day. The entire site was redesigned by Vanguardia Consulting, who provide specialist advice on sound control. Capacity was increased to 20,000, and bars and toilets across the site were doubled. More than fifty artists were again billed for the festival, including Simian Mobile Disco, Les Savy Fav, Mystery Jets and Laura Marling. The event was headlined by Foals, in what was their first UK headline festival performance. A 25-member brass band was also added as a final addition to the line-up. The event now featured five stages, an increase from the previous year. The main stage was retitled the "Converse Century Stage", to reflect the company's 100-year anniversary in 2008. A similar stage was used at Underage Festival the previous day.

Converse Century Stage	NME Stage	Homefires Stage	Bugged Out! Stage	Bloggers Delight Stage
Beyond the Wizard's Sleeve; El Guincho; Foals; Howling Bells; Huw Stephens (DJ set); Laura Marling; Les Savy Fav; Lightspeed Champion; ~~Mystery Jets~~; Noah and the Whale; Of Montreal; The Field; Wild Beasts	~~Dan Deacon~~; Filthy Dukes; Magistrates; Simian Mobile Disco; The Emperor Machine; The Notwist; White Lies; Benga; Crispin Dior; Matt Helders (DJ set); Stopmakingme (DJ set); The Mae Shi	Alasdair Roberts; Efterklang; Emma Pollock; Fionn Regan; Jeffrey Lewis; King Creosote; One Little Plane; The Pictish Trail; Rob da Bank; Tunng	Brodinski; Crookers; Disco Bloodbath DJs; Hannah Holland and MC Chickaboo; James Holden; Matt Walsh; Modeselektor; Richie Hawtin	Casper C; Corman; Heartbreak; Ian Robinson; Jacob Husley; Matt and Olly; Mikki Most; Peter Pixzel; Primary 1; Rory Phillips; Skull Juice; The Lovely Jonjo

- Dan Deacon had been due to play on the NME stage, but was later forced to pull out due to passport issues. Mystery Jets also pulled out due to illness. They were later replaced by Lightspeed Champion.

=== 2009 festival ===
The 2009 festival took place on 1 August 2009, one day prior to Underage. The first line-up announcements were made on 28 January 2009, when NME announced that Mogwai would headline the event. Four Tet, James Yorkston, Apes and Androids, Malcolm Middleton, Fennesz, Errors and Skream were also announced. Further line-up additions were announced on 7 April 2009, including The Horrors, Little Boots, Santigold and Mystery Jets. Other line-up announcements have been sporadically announced through the festival's Twitter account.

Eat Your Own Ears Main Stage	Adventures in the Beetroot Field Stage	Village Mentality Stage	Bugged Out! Stage	Bloggers Delight Stage
Eat Your Own Ears DJs; Errors; Fanfarlo; Fennesz; Final Fantasy; Gaggle; Mogwai; Santigold; Skream; The Horrors; The Temper Trap	Allez Allez; Crispin Dior (DJ Set); Devil Made Me Do It; Four Tet; King Charles; Micachu and the Shapes; Mystery Jets; Plugs; S.C.U.M; Sian Alice Group; Stopmakingme (DJ Set); The Big Pink; Wild Beasts	First Aid Kit; James Yorkston; Jon Hopkins; Juana Molina; The Local DJs; Malcolm Middleton; Mumford & Sons; The Thing; Toumani Diabaté; Twisted Folk DJs; Wet Paint; Woodpigeon	Aeroplane DJs; Audion; Delphic; Erol Alkan; Fake Blood; JD Twitch (Optimo); Little Boots; Wild Geese DJs	Casper C; Dave I.D.; Drums of Death; Greco-Roman Soundsystem; No Pain in Pop DJs; Rusko (DJ set); Skull Juice; The xx; Totally Enormous Extinct Dinosaurs; Work It

=== 2010 Festival ===
The 2010 event was confirmed to take place on 31 July 2010, in their fourth annual outing in Victoria Park. On 9 February 2010, it was announced that Phoenix would headline the event, with Amiina, Beth Jeans Houghton, Caribou, Esben and the Witch, Chilly Gonzalez, Corsano and Flowers, Gold Panda, Hypnotic Brass Ensemble, James Holden, Joker & MC Nomad, Max Tundra, Memory Tapes, Mouse on Mars, Pantha Du Prince and Silver Apples also announced to perform. Further acts were announced on 12 March 2010, when Babeshadow, Carte Blanche (DJ Mehdi & Riton), Chapel Club, Hudson Mohawke, Lightspeed Champion, No Age, Simian Mobile Disco, Tamikrest, The Fall, These New Puritans and YucK were added. The festival is set to expand further to six stages, including the Outdoor live stage, Adventures in the Beetroot Field arena, Homefires stage, Bugged Out! arena, Bloggers Delight stage, and the musical bandstand.

For the first time in 2010, Field Day is to take part in a festival 'twinning' scheme, organised by the Association of Independent Festivals (AIF). The initiative encourages twinned festivals to swap artists and cross promote each other's events. Field Day was 'twinned' with the Øya Festival in Oslo, Norway.

Eat Your Own Ears Stage	Adverntures in the Beetroot Field Stage	Bugged Out! Stage in association with Full Circle and Dummy	XOYO / Lock Tavern Stage	Bloggers Delight Stage	Village Mentality Stage in association with The Quietus
Andrew Weatherall DJ; Anna Calvi; Bethan Elfyn * The Vinyl Vendettas; Caribou; Erland and the Carnival; Gilles Peterson; Holly Miranda; Hypnotic Brass Ensemble; Lightspeed Champion; Phoenix; Ramadanman; Steve Mason; The Fall; The Invisible DJ	Atlas Sound; Cate Le Bon; Chapel Club; Egyptian Hip Hop; Is Tropical; Last.FM DJ; No Age; Now Wave DJ; Our Girls DJ; The Kissaway Trail; These New Puritans	Carte Blanche (DJ Mehdi & Riton); Chilly Gonzales; Fake Blood; James Holden; Joker & MC Nomad; Memory Tapes; Moderat; Rory Phillips; Simian Mobile Disco DJ; Tensnake; The Golden Filter	Babeshadow; Club.The.Mammoth DJ; Dam Mantle; Don't Die Wondering DJ; Factory Floor; Hounds of Hate; Leather Boy DJ; MIM (Black Cab Sessions; No Pain in Pop DJ; Prizes; Sexbeat DJ; Sunday Girl; Toro Y Moi; Von Haze; Walls; Yuck	Bloggers Delight (Casper C, NikNikNik, Skull Juice); Dam Funk & Master Blazter; Deadly Rhythm DJ; FACT DJ; Feeding Time DJ; Gold Panda Live; Hudson Mohawke Live; Mount Kimbie Live; Night Slugs (L-Vis 1990 & Bok Bok); Off Modern DJ; Pantha Du Prince Live	Amiina; Archie Bronson Outfit; Beth Jeans Houghton; Double Denim DJ; Esben and the Witch; Flower Corsano Duo; Gruff Rhys vs Tony Da Gatorra; Max Tundra; Mouse on Mars; Runners; Shula Wigwam DJ; Silver Apples; Thisaintnodisco

=== 2011 Festival ===
The 2011 event took place on 6 August 2011. The next day, a companion festival took place, with the same organisers and similar stages at the location, under the name The Apple Cart festival.

Eat Your Own Ears Stage	Bugged Out! Stage in association with Resident Advisor	Village Mentality Stage in association with The Quietus	Bloggers Delight / Lanzarote Stage	Laneway Festival Stage in association with Last.FM	Shacklewell Arms / Lock Tavern Stage	Do You Come Here Often? Stage
Baio (Vampire Weekend) DJ; Chimes; Electrelane; Huw Stephens DJ; Jen Long DJ; John Cale; Junip; Justin Speak DJ; Sun Ra Arkestra; The Coral; Villagers; Warpaint; Wild Beasts; Willy Mason	Benga & Youngman; Carl Craig presents 69; Erol Alkan; James Blake DJ; Kieran Hebden B2B James Holden; L-VIS 1990; Matt Walsh DJ; Michael Mayer; Pearson Sound; Roska	About Group; Anna Calvi; Ariel Pink's Haunted Graffiti; Factory Floor; Faust; Gruff Rhys; Jon Hillcock DJ; Konono No.1; Mark Kozelek; Omar Souleyman; The Sea and Cake; Toy	Actress; Anika; Bleed DJ; Casper C DJ; Darkstar; Ducktails; Hype Williams; Jamie xx; Lanzarote DJ; Nik Nik Nik DJ; Oneotrix Point Never; SBTRKT; Skull Juice DJ; Zola Jesus	2:54; Baio (Vampire Weekend) DJ; Connan Mockasin; James Blake Live; Jamie Woon; Jon Hopkins DJ; Laneway Festival DJ; Matthew Dear Live; Mount Kimbie; The History of Apple Pie; The Horrors; Twin Shadow	Beach Creep DJ; Born Ruffians; Chad Valley; Clock Opera; CocknBullkid; Creep; Dollop DJs; Factory Floor; Feeding Time DJ; Givers; Glasser; God Don't Like It DJ; Leather Boy DJ; Martin Creed; No Pain in Pop DJ; S.C.U.M.; Sexbeat DJ; Spector; Tribes; Trophy Wife	Alitrec; Boom Boom Cabaret; Club.The.Mammoth vs Grimes DJ; Dance Party 4000; Echo Lane; Greenwich Tea Party; Jig T DJ; John McIvor; Kicker Conspiracy DJ; No Bones DJ; Spectrals; Star Slinger DJ; Still Corners; The Bookhouse Boys; Veronica Falls; Visions of Trees

=== 2012 Festival ===
The 2012 festival date moved from the traditional August month to Saturday 2 June 2012 (bank holiday weekend). This was due to Victoria Park being used for events to celebrate the London Olympics. The Apple Cart festival took place again on the next-day Sunday.

Eat Your Own Ears Stage	Bugged Out! Stage	Laneway Festival Stage in association with Last.FM	Village Mentality Stage in association with The Quietus	Bleed / Lanzarote Stage	Shacklewell Arms	Red Bull Music Academy Stage
Andrew Bird; Beirut; Eat Your Own Ears DJ; Franz Ferdinand; Huw Stephens DJ; Justin Spear DJ; Last Dinosaurs; Liars; Metronomy; Pond; Savages	Blawan DJ; Daniel Avery DJ; Eats Everything DJ; Hudson Mohawke Live; Julio Bashmore DJ; Koreless Live; Maya Jane Coles DJ; Modeselektor; Rustie Live; The Internet Live	Blood Orange; Deco Child DJ; Dum Dum Girls DJ; Errors; Here We Go Magic; Kindness; Sega Bodega DJ; Sleigh Bells; Spector; Summer Camp; The Vaccines; Two Jackals	Afrocubism; Django Django; Gold Panda; Grimes; Mazzy Star; Papa M; R. Stevie Moore; Revere; Rocketnumbernine; Tim Burgess; Tortoise	Blackest Ever Black DJ; Casper C DJ; Com Truise; Fennesz; Julia Holter; Kassem Mosse; Laurel Halo; Paddy O'Neill DJ; Peaking Lights; The Haxan Cloak DJ; Zomby DJ	Amateur Best DJ; Austra; Baxter Dury; Beach Creep; Bobby Tank DJ; Citizens!; Crocodiles; Double Denim DJ; Friends; Jeffrey Lewis & The Junkyard; Jen Long DJ; Jig T DJ; Lanzarote DJ; Novella DJ; Outfit; Sexbeat; The Men; Theme Park; To Kill A King; Toy; When Saints Go Machine; Zulu Winter	Blanck Mass; Chairlift; Debruit; Jessie Ware; Kidkanevil; Sunless '97; UMA

=== 2013 Festival ===
Following on from 2012's change in date, Field Day 2013 took place on Saturday 25 May (bank holiday weekend).

Eat Your Own Ears Stage	Bugged Out! Stage	Laneway Festival Stage in association with Last.FM	Village Mentality Stage in association with The Quietus	Bleed / Lanzarote Stage	Shacklewell Arms	Red Bull Music Academy Stage	Back Stage Area
Animal Collective; Bat For Lashes; Four Tet; Eyoe; Everything Everything; Gabriel Bruce; Jon Hillock; MT Warning; Solange; Stealing Sheep; Thomas Mapfumo	Disclosure; Jacques Greene; TNGHT; Ben Pearce; Ben UFO; Daniel Avery; Daphni; Julio Bashmore; Pangaea; Pearson Sound; Seth Troxler	Charlie Boyer + The Voy..; Chvrches; Dark Bells; Daughter; Django Django; Kurt Vile; Mount Kimbie; Palma Violets; Savages	Do Make Say Think; East India Youth; Ginger Baker Jazz Confu..; James Yorkston; King Krule; Mulatu Astatke; Stubborn Heart; Tim Burgess	Bleep DJs; Charanjit Singh; How To Dress Well; Lee Gamble; Volte Face; Karenn; Shed; Objekt	Connan Moackasin; Dark Dark Dark; Feathers; Francois and The Atlas ..; Fucked Up; Guards; Jen Long; John Cooper Clarke; Metz; Splashh; Toy; Virals; Vondelpark; Wild Nothing	Amateur Best; Bobby Tank DJ; Duologue; Egyptian Hip Hop; Happa; J. Marinetti; Jagwar Ma; Koreless; Kwes; Rainy Milo; Rudi Zygadlo; Throwing Snow	Teen Creeps DJs

=== 2014 Festival ===
In 2014, Field Day expanded to a two-day event. It took place on the weekend of 7–8 June 2014, headlined by Pixies and Metronomy.

Appearing were:

RA Stage	Eat Your Own Ears	Bugged Out	Crack Magazine	Shacklewell Arms	Red Bull Music Academy	Red Stripe Bandstand
Bake FunkinEven James Holden (live) Omar Souleyman Oneohtrix Point Never George FitzGerald Todd Terje (live) Erol Alkan Daniel Avery	Tom Baker Arthur Beatrice Phil Taggart Sky Ferreira Seun Kuti & Fela's Egypt 80 Huw Stephens Blood Orange Warpaint Marc Riley Jon Hopkins Metronomy	Volte-Face Eclair Fifi Gerd Janson Dusky Jackmaster & Oneman Jamie XX Dixon Âme SBTRKT	Crack Magazine DJs Lo Fang Thurston Moore Marika Hackman Simian Mobile Disco SOHN Last fm DJs Ghostpoet Neneh Cherry Tim Burgess Jagwar Ma Tourist Danny Brown	Shacklewell Arms DJs PAWS Becoming Real Charlotte OC Only Real Jaakko Eino Kalevi Transgressive Soundsystem All We Are Teleman Dry the River John Wizards Woman's Hour Jen Long Courtney Barnett M O N E Y Mystery Jets East India Youth Fat White Family	Moxie DJ Barely Legal Slackk b2b Samename Vessel Sophie Jamie Isaac Evian Christ Jessy Lanza Ryan Hemsworth Lunice	Charli Avery Morgan Hammer Lemmy Ashton Justin Robertson Jonjo Jury Transgressive Soundsystem

=== 2015 Festival ===
The 2015 festival took place on the weekend of 6–7 June 2015, and was headlined by Caribou, Ride and Patti Smith.

Caribou; Ride; Patti Smith; tUnE-yArDs; Django Django; Chet Faker; Mac DeMarco; Madlib; DIIV; Hudson Mohawke; Todd Terje; My Brightest Diamond; FKA Twigs; John Talabot; Savages	Owen Pallett; Kindness; Ducktails; Clark; Sylvan Esso; Allah-Las; Run the Jewels; Baxter Dury; Floating Points; Nina Kraviz; Daniel Avery; Philip Selway; Ten Walls; Toumani Diabaté	Ben Klock; Outfit; Fryars; SOPHIE; Hookworms; Marcel Dettmann; Tei Shi; Antix; DJ Andrew Weatherall; Shura; Viet Cong; Jack Garratt; Jane Weaver; Leon Vynehall	Ghost Culture; Elijah & Skilliam; Hailu Mergia; Awesome Tapes from Africa; Sidiki Diabate; Bad Breeding; Jagaara; Wild Echo; DJ Huw Stephens; DJ Marc Riley; DJ Tom Ravenscroft; DJ Tony Buck; DJ Phil Taggart; Teen Creeps DJs

=== 2016 Festival ===
2016 was the 10th anniversary edition of Field Day. It took place on Saturday 11th and Sunday 12 June 2016. The line up was:

Air; Adam Green; Ata Kak; Avalon Emerson; Baio (DJ set); Beach House; Ben Watt Band feat. Bernard Butler; Bicep - live Blossoms; Brian Jonestown Massacre; Cass McCombs; Champion; Coves; Danny L Harle; Daphni; Dean Blunt; Declan McKenna; D.D Dumbo	Deerhunter; DIIV; Dilly Dally; DJ Koze; Dusky; Empress Of; Fakear; Fat White Family; Fickle Friends; Floating Points - live Formation; Four Tet; Frisco; Gillbanks; Girl Band; Goat; Gold Panda; Greco-Roman Soundsystem; Happy Meal Ltd.	Holly Herndon - live Jackmaster b2b Gerd Janson James Blake; John Grant; Junior Boys; Kelela; Kimmo Pohjonen Skin; KINK - live Little Simz; Loyle Carner; LUH; Lxury; Mabel; Mbongwana Star; Meilyr Jones; Mentsh (GRSS); Metz; Mind Enterprises; Molly Nilsson; Moon Duo	Motor City Drum Ensemble; Mount Kimbie DJ Set Mura Masa; Mystery Jets; Nao; Nimmo; Novelist; Opal People (DJ set); Optimo; Orchestra Baobab; Paradise Bangkok Molam International Band; Parquet Courts PJ Harvey; Plastician; Red Axes - live Rejjie Snow; Roman Flügel; Roots Manuva; Shock Machine; Skepta; Sleaford Mods	Slimzee; Steve Mason Special Request; Tale of Us; Tangerines; Teen Creeps DJs; The Black Madonna; The Temper Trap; The Thurston Moore Group; Tirzah (live); Tourist; Wild Nothing; Wooden Wisdom & Dj Fitz; Yeasayer; Yorkston/Thorne/Khan; Youth Lagoon

=== 2017 Festival ===
The festival was reduced to one day and was on Saturday 3 June. This was the last year in Victoria Park.

The Barn	Crack	Bugged Out	Eat Your Own Ears	Moth Club	Resident Advisor	Shacklewell Arms	Bleep presents the Bandstand
Aphex Twin Nina Kraviz Nicolas Jaar Jon Hopkins (DJ) Moderat Marcel Dettmann Dekmantel Soundsystem	Slowdive Tom Ravenscroft Mura Masa Arab Strap Esther Joy Death Grips Dr John Cooper Clarke HMLTD Pictish Trail Kite Base	Hunee Fatima Yamaha - live Joe Goddard Job Jobse Overmono Lena Willikens Midland Tom Demac	Run The Jewels Lady Leshurr Phil Taggart Whitney Rae Morris Loyle Carner Hælos Imarhan Manuela Tom Baker Soundsystem	Omar Souleyman PC Music presents Danny L Harle, A.G. Cook & More Clams Casino Silver Apples Sinkane Gaika Beak> Idris Ackamoor & The Pyramids Andy Shauf	Flying Lotus Moodymann Âme (live) Lena Willikens Machinedrum Forest Swords ABRA Kaitlyn Aurelia Smith Siren DJs	Thee Oh Sees Marc Riley King Gizzard and the Lizard Wizard S U R V I V E Kevin Morby Flamingods Julia Jacklin Methyl Ethel Áine Cahill Jade Bird	E. Myers Mike Paradinas Kode9 Raime b2b Yally Ikonika Wallwork Tsvi

=== 2018 Festival ===
The 2018 festival moved to Brockwell Park in Herne Hill and took place on 1 and 2 June. The headliners were Erykah Badu, Four Tet, Thundercat and Fever Ray.

Friday 1 June
Eat Your Own Ears x Fader	Dimensions x Total Refreshment Centre	Shacklewell Arms x London In Stereo	MOTH Club x It's Nice That	Superdry Sounds
Erykah Badu; Loyle Carner; NAO; Mammal Hands; Moses Sumney; Wu-Lu; Andwot & Clara Amfo; Huw Stephens; Matthew Halsall	Tony Allen & Jeff Mills; The Comet is Coming; Moses Boyd Exodus; Obongjayar; IAMDDB; Sons of Kemet; Ezra Collective; Children of Zeus; Total Refreshment Centre x Church of Sound; Sean OD; Jazz Re:Freshed	Mr Jukes; Jordan Rakei; Masego; Gilles Peterson; Mafalda; Nabihah Iqbal; Aaron L	Lee Fields & The Expressions; Sudan Archives; Hailu Mergia; Zara McFarlane; Nubya Garcia; Yazmin Lacey; Brownswood DJs	Mahalia; JPEGMafia; Hak Baker; Conner Youngblood; Ashnikko; Aaron Unknown; Ami Carmine

Saturday 2 June
Eat Your Own Ears x The Quietus	The Hydra x The Barn	CRACK	Bugged Out! x FACT	Resident Advisor	Superdry Sounds
Thundercat; Charlotte Gainsbourg; KURUPT FM; AJ Tracey; Oumou Sangaré; Tomorrow's Warriors Female Frontline; Project Karnak; Tom Ravenscroft; Barely Legal; EYOE DJs; Tom Baker Soundsystem	Four Tet; Floating Points; Panda Bear; Daphni; Nils Frahm; Willow; Dolan Bergin	Fever Ray; Cornelius; Mount Kimbie; ZHU; Princess Nokia; James Holden & The Animal Spirits; Jimothy Lacoste; Harry James; Georgie Rogers; Marcus Harris; Milner & Vish; 239EF DJs; Syrra DJs	Gilles Peterson; Young Marco; DJ Seinfeld; DJ Boring; Moscoman; Jayda G; HAAi; Lemmy Ashton	Daniel Avery; Helena Hauff; Avalon Emerson; Tzusing; Objekt B2B Batu; Ross From Friends; Tash LC	AU/RA; FEET; SASSY 009; Whenyoung; G Flip; Boy Pablo; Jack Vallier; Self Esteem; Benny Mails; Klose One

=== 2019 Festival ===
The 2019 festival was at Meridian Water in Enfield on 7 and 8 June. The headliners were Skepta and Jorja Smith. There was a new system in place for the festival; a Day part and a Late Night part; the Day part of the festival finished around 10.30 pm and the Late Night part of the festival finished around 3 am. The line up was:

Friday 7 June

Eat Your Own Ears	Printworks	CRACK	Boot Room	Bulldog Gin Yard
Skepta; Jungle; Death Grips; Earl Sweatshirt; Mahalia; Homeshake; Kojey Radical; Femi Kuti; Jessica Winter	Late Night: Maya Jane Coles presents Nocturnal Sunshine; Leon Vynehall; Modeselektor (live); George Fitzgerald; Bonobo (dj); George Fitzgerald; Leon Vynehall; Actress; Lost Souls of Saturn; Kelly Lee Owens; Charlotte Adigéry	Modeselektor (live); Deerhunter; Julia Holter; Tirzah; Methyl Ethel; Haelos; Boy Azooga; Pip Bloom	Yizzy; Tirzah; RIMON; Brad Stank; Crows; Denzel Himself & KEYAH/BLU; Reprezent FM	Erol Alkan; Baba Stiltz; Skee Mask; Marie Davidson (live); DEBONAIR; Jay Carder; Fall Forward

Saturday 8 June

Eat Your Own Ears	Printworks	Boiler Room	Boot Room	Bulldog Gin Yard
Jorja Smith; Diplo; Pusha T; Roosevelt; Sinkane; The Mauskovic Dance Band; Celeste; Jvck James; Rachel Chinouriri	Late Night: Mella Dee; Denis Sulta; Tiga; HAAi; The Black Madonna; Seth Troxler; Mall Grab; John Talabot; Courtesy; Grainger	Octavian; JPEGMafia; Flohio; Mor Mor; Channel Tres; Red Axes (dj); Alfie Templeman	Flohio; Marika Hackman; Emma-Jean Thackray; Rachel Chinouriri; Frankie Stew & Harvey Gunn; Reprezent FM	Todd Terje (dj); Denis Sulta; DJ Seinfeld; HAAi; Mella Dee; Eclair Fifi; Fall Forward

=== 2020 Festival ===
The 2020 festival was at Drumsheds in Tottenham on 11th July, with the likes of Floating Points (live), Tale Of Us, Mount Kimbie (DJ), Floorplan (DJ), Josey Rebelle, Maribou State (DJ), Ross From Friends (live), Special Request and many more joined BICEP (live).

=== 2021 Festival ===
The 2021 festival returned to its original home, Victoria Park, on 29th August with a special live performance from the acclaimed Irish duo Bicep LIVE.

The full line up included:

Bicep LIVE (Exclusive London Festival), Adelphi Music Factory, Artwork, The Blessed Madonna, Donna Leake, Floating Points Live, Floorplan DJ Set, George FitzGerald (DJ) & DJ Seinfeld, IMOGEN, India Jordan, Jaguar, Josey Rebelle, Jungle (UK) DJ Set, KETTAMA, Logic1000, Mall Grab, Mount Kimbie DJ Set, Overmono Live, Prospa, Ross From Friends Live, Special Request, TSHA, & O'Flynn

=== 2022 Festival ===
The 2022 festival was again hosted in Victoria Park, on the 20th of August with electronic music duo, The Chemical Brothers, and the band that invented it, Kraftwerk, plus special guest Peggy Gou. The 15th anniversary also features Floating Points, Daniel Avery [live], Squarepusher [live], Logic1000, Erol Alkan, Carl Craig b2b Moodymann, Folamour, and many more.

The full line up included:

The Chemical Brothers, Kraftwerk, Peggy Gou, Artwork b2b CC:DISCO!, Carl Craig b2b Moodymann, Cici, Daniel Avery (live), Denis Sulta b2b Mella Dee, Eliza Rose, Emerald b2b Jossy Mitsu, Erol Alkan, FJAAK [DJ set], Floating Points, Folamour: Power to the PPL [A/V], HAAi, Heléna Star, Kareem Ali, Logic1000, Otik, salute, Squarepusher (live), Tourist (live).

=== 2023 Festival ===
After a sold out 2022 edition, Field Day was back at Victoria Park on 19th August with headliners Aphex Twin and Bonobo. Joining them were Jon Hopkins, Jayda G, Arca, Kelela, Fever Ray, Actress (live), Julianna Huxtable, Sudan Archives, TSHA (live), and more.

The full line up included:

East Stage	West Stage	CUPRA North Arena	BBC 6 Music Stage	New Artist Stage
Hagop Tchaparian; Surusinghe; LSDXOXO b2b Juliana Huxtable; Jayda G; Fever Ray; Arca; Aphex Twin	MAFRO; Desire; Sudan Archives; TSHA (Live); Jon Hopkins; Bonobo	Giulia Tess; Actress (Live); Kai Campos: Mount Kimbie; SBTRKT; Kelala; Moderat	Ella Knight; Mary Anne Hobbs; quest?onmarq; Elkka; yunè pinku (DJ Set); Effy; Anastasia Kristensen; Chloé Robinson	Bibi Seck; Love Remain; GAZZI; Art School Girlfriend (DJ Set)

=== 2024 Festival ===
The 2024 edition was once again at Victoria Park on 24th August. The headliners included French electro house legends Justice and Belgian DJ and producer Charlotte de Witte, and further down the line up were the likes of Mura Masa, Romy, Shygirl, Yaeji and Sega Bodega.

The full line up included:

East Stage	West Stage	CUPRA North Arena	BBC 6 Music Stage
George Riley; I. Jordan Live; Shygirl presents Clubshy; Romy; Mura Masa DJ set; Justice	John Glacier; 2manydjs; Bambii; Tiga & Hudson Mohawke; Yves Tumor; Charlotte de Witte	Memphis LK; HorsegiirL; Sega Bodega; Yaeji Live; Skin on Skin & KETTAMA; Brutalismus 3000	Mary Anne Hobbs; Deena Abdelwahed; Ela Minus DJ set; LCY b2b Yazzus; AFRODEUTSCHE; ANNA; Jlin

=== 2025 Festival ===
Field Day 2025 enters a new chapter relocating to Brockwell Park, on 24th May 2025. The lineup announcement led by internationally celebrated DJ Peggy Gou, spans across 6 stages offering 6 diverse sounds.

As of May 2025, fifteen artists had dropped out of the line up due to ties to private equity firm KKR over its investments in the occupied Palestinian territories. Besides, more than 200 performers signed an open letter urging Field Day festival event organizers to cut ties with the investor firm.

The full line up includes:

South Stage	The Bowl	Bugged Out!	The Green	Corsica Studios	Sisu x Dazed Club
Peggy Gou; Bubble Love (Ross From Friends); Emerald; Folamour; Girls Dont Sync; Jayda G; Nicola Bear	4am Kru; James Blake (DJ) B2B Mala; Lu.Re; Skream & Benga; Special Request B2B Yung Singh; Storm Mollison; Y U QT	Demi Riquismo B2B Matisa; Dixon (A/V Set); Fall Forward; Fatima Yamaha (Live); Jungle (DJ); Midland; Tarzsa	AK Sports; Mall Grab; Modeselektor (DJ); Partiboi69; SWIM; VTSS	Dresden (Ivan Smagghe and Manfredas); Pangaea; Regularfantasy; Roza Terenzi; Sarahtonin; Spray pres. Spriitzz Live	Ariane V; Calaida; Chickie; ex.sses; GUYZ; inda Flo; izzy. b2b Malissa
