= Unclassified (Adult Swim album) =

{UNCLASSIFIED}

Compilation album by Various artists
- Released: September 2011
- Genre: Outsider house, Dubstep
- Label: Williams Street

Adult Swim Music chronology
Adult Swim Singles Program 2011 (2011)	{UNCLASSIFIED} (2011)	Adult Swim Singles Program 2012 (2012)

{UNCLASSIFIED} is a compilation album released by Adult Swim. The album was released as a free download on their website. It consists of rare and/or unreleased material from various artists.

== Track listing ==
1. Ikonika – "World on Mute"
2. xxxy – "Kerpow"
3. Untold – "Peaky"
4. Geiom – "Pure Bristle"
5. Ginz – "Chrome"
6. Lukid – "Running From The Demons"
7. Geeneus ft Riko, Wiley and Breeze – "Knife & Gun" (Dusk & Blackdown 2step mix ft Farrah)
8. SBTRKT – "Golddigger"
9. Starkey – "Eris"
10. Actress – "Murder Plaza"
11. Zomby – "Hexagons"
12. Dauwd – "Ikopol"
13. Boxcutter – "Waiting For The Lights"
14. Babe Rainbow ft Ashley Webber – "Give You Time"
15. Burial – "Street Halo"
16. Kode9 – "Just Inside"
17. Pinch – "Blow Out The Candle"
18. Cooly G – "R U Listening"
