= Hazyville =

Studio album by Actress
- Released: November 28, 2008
- Genres: Outsider house; glitch; minimal techno
- Length: 44:29
- Labels: Werk Discs, Ninja Tune

Actress chronology
Hazyville (2008)	Splazsh (2010)

Professional ratings
Review scores
Source	Rating
AllMusic	4/5 stars

Hazyville is the debut album by the electronic musician Actress. It was initially released on November 28, 2008, by Werk Discs, and later under Ninja Tune.

== Track listing ==
No.	Title	Length
1.	"Again the Addiction"	3:51
2.	"Hazylude"	0:34
3.	"Doggin'"	3:44
4.	"Ivy May Gilpin"	5:16
5.	"I Can't Forgive You"	3:54
6.	"Crushed"	3:16
7.	"Redit 124"	3:23
8.	"Againlude"	1:30
9.	"Hazyville"	5:35
10.	"Mincin"	6:34
11.	"Green Gal"	6:52
Total length:		44:29
