= From the Toolkit of Lovers =

Studio album by Loidis
- Released: October 23, 2026
- Genre: Minimal house
- Length: 111:02
- Label: Incienso
- Producer: Brian Leeds

Loidis chronology
One Day (2024)	From the Toolkit of Lovers (2026)

Singles from From the Toolkit of Lovers
- 1. "Towlift" Released: September 10, 2026; 2. "Dry Your Eyes" Released: October 2, 2026

From the Toolkit of Lovers is the second studio album by Loidis, the alias of American outsider house musician Brian Leeds. It was released on October 23, 2026, via Incienso. It was preceded by two singles, "Towlift" and "Dry Your Eyes."

== Reception ==
Daniel Bromfield of Pitchfork gave the album an 8/10. They described the record as nudging the minimal house revival "toward new extremes—of detail, duration, sensuousness—on a sprawling triple LP of hypnotic, late-night grooves." Moreover, highlighting lush pads and "addictive chord-snaps" throughout. They also praise the record for justifying its length, noting that the lack of ambient interludes typically found on Leeds music and consistent lengths make the album slide by easily. Their main complaint was a lack of experimentation and self-indulgence, feeling that an album its length justifies the occasional pretentious idea, something they note Leeds had done on previous records.

Will Patterson of Inverted Audio also gave a highly positive review of the record. They described the album as a "nearly 2-hour smorgasbord of minimal goodness." Additionally, they state that the extended runtimes of the tracks leads to a very rewarding experience, elaborating by stating that "When a delayed chord finally echoes around the cavern of your skull, or a crisp hi-hat suddenly establishes a new rhythmic emphasis, it’s a reward for those who stick with the record and give it their full attention."

Ben Beaumont-Thomas of The Guardian gave the album a 4/5. They believed the album to be among the grandest statements Leeds had ever released as an artist across any alias, believing that Leeds does an impressive job justifying its length. They highlighted elements of Luomo-esque microhouse on much of the record as well as sound design reminiscent of ASMR. Their main complaint was that the album began to lose some of its adventurous momentum in the back half, but still overall praised the record.

== Track listing ==
All tracks are written by Brian Leeds.

From The Toolkit Of Lovers track listing
No.	Title	Length
1.	"TT Stunt"	7:30
2.	"A Fine Line"	9:59
3.	"Towlift"	7:17
4.	"Dry Your Eyes"	10:27
5.	"Possession Centre"	7:41
6.	"Horse on Wheels"	11:43
7.	"Running Rich"	10:06
8.	"Council Groove"	9:12
9.	"Shopgirl Keepsake"	11:01
10.	"Copy Plot"	8:46
11.	"The Lowest Word"	8:57
12.	"I Would Be Glad on It"	8:23
Total length:		111:02

== Personnel ==
Credits adapted from Bandcamp.

- Brian Leeds – production, songwriting
- Josh Abramovici – artwork
- Anne Taegert – mastering, lacquer cut
- Ian Kim Judd – press text
