= Ghettoville =

Studio album by Actress
- Released: 27 January 2014
- Genres: Electronic; glitch; minimal techno
- Length: 69:13
- Labels: Werkdiscs, Ninja Tune

Actress chronology
R.I.P. (2012)	Ghettoville (2014)	AZD (2017)

Professional ratings
Aggregate scores
Source	Rating
Metacritic	72/100
Review scores
Source	Rating
AllMusic	4/5 stars
Clash	8/10
Consequence of Sound	C+
Drowned in Sound	9/10
The Guardian	4/5 stars
The Irish Times	3/5 stars
The Observer	3/5 stars
Pitchfork	6.7/10
Slant Magazine	4/5 stars
Spin	8/10

Ghettoville is the fourth studio album by British electronic musician Actress. It was released on 27 January 2014 by Werkdiscs and Ninja Tune.

== Track listing ==
No.	Title	Length
1.	"Forgiven"	7:22
2.	"Street Corp."	5:32
3.	"Corner"	4:21
4.	"Rims"	5:51
5.	"Contagious"	4:44
6.	"Birdcage"	2:34
7.	"Our"	2:32
8.	"Time"	6:03
9.	"Towers"	3:27
10.	"Gaze"	5:03
11.	"Skyline"	5:52
12.	"Image"	2:29
13.	"Don't"	1:16
14.	"Rap"	2:39
15.	"Frontline"	5:47
16.	"Rule"	3:41
17.	"Grey Over Blue" (Japanese edition bonus track)	7:52
Total length:		77:20

== Charts ==
Chart	Peak position
US Top Dance/Electronic Albums (Billboard)	20
