= Anthony Naples =

American electronic musician and DJ

- Born: 1990 (age 35–36)
- Origin: New York City, United States
- Genres: Electronic music
- Occupations: Musician, DJ
- Label: Incienso
- Website: http://www.anthonynapl.es/

Anthony Naples (born 1990) is an American electronic musician and DJ, based in New York City.

== Biography ==
As a producer, his early work was associated with the burgeoning outsider house scene in the United States, but has diversified in recent years to include Ambient, Techno, Deep House, and more experimental styles. His music has received attention from The Guardian, The New York Times, and Resident Advisor, the latter of which placed his debut single "Mad Disrespect" and album "Body Pill" in their end of the year lists.

Naples has released his music on a variety of independent labels including The Trilogy Tapes, Rubadub, and Mister Saturday Night Records, as well as an album on Four Tet's Text Records.

Aside from producing his own works, Naples also currently operates a record label called Incienso, and previously, Proibito, which was responsible for releasing Huerco S' critically acclaimed "For Those Of You Who Have, and Also Those Of You Who Have Never."

== Discography ==
=== Albums ===
- Body Pill (2015)
- Take Me With You (2018)
- Fog FM (2019)
- Chameleon (2021)
- Orbs (2023)
- Scanners (2025)
- In Studio Magic (2025)

=== EP's ===
- Mad Disrespect EP (2012)
- El Portal (2013)
- RAD-AN1 (2013)
- Moscato (2013)
- P O T (2013)
- Zipacon EP (2014)
- Smacks EP (2015)
- Slice Of Life (2016)
- Us Mix (2016)
- Love No Border (2017)
- OTT/ZTL (2018)
