= Discreet Desires =

Studio album by Helena Hauff
- Released: 4 September 2015
- Genre: Electro; techno; industrial techno
- Length: 41:32
- Label: Werkdiscs; Ninja Tune
- Producer: Helena Hauff

Helena Hauff chronology
A Tape (2015)	Discreet Desires (2015)	Qualm (2018)

Discreet Desires is the debut full-length studio album by German DJ and record producer Helena Hauff. It was released on 4 September 2015 by Werkdiscs and Ninja Tune.

== Background ==
Debuting in 2013 with a brand of "hardware-driven" and "dark acid techno-influenced music", Hauff worked with various different labels, including James Dean Brown's Hypnobeat record label, Following the release of Lex Tertia EP in 2014, Hauff collaborated with Werkdiscs and Ninja Tune labels to release her debut album.

The press material described the record as "the embodiment of Helena’s deep-seated beliefs about music as a radical force and unifying movement." The record is based on an old photograph Hauff found and "felt compelled to make music around." "The atmosphere of that photo seemed to project a certain sound to me, so I tried to replicate it in musical form, to somehow try to make the music sound how the photo looked". Rejecting that Discreet Desires is a conceptual album, Hauff stated that she "just had a conceptual approach to it." The photograph which served as an inspiration on the record was to be its artwork before Hauff switched it at the last minute.

== Music ==
Drowned in Sound critic Nick Roseblade labeled Discreet Desires as "a classic electro album with techno leanings," with all tracks sounding "authentically retro and filthy." AllMusic's Paul Simpson thought that the record retains the "grittiness of her previous releases, but has a much wider scope, sounding much fuller and more melodic while avoiding sounding polished or sterile." Noting the "spooky goth melodies and snapping, marching beats", Simpson also remarked that the vintage electro and industrial/EBM influences, which were "always evident in Hauff's work", came into full focus with Discreet Desires. Andy Battaglia of Rolling Stone regarded that the "vintage-signifying synth and drum-machine sounds plus a blocky, patterned approach to programming of the album peer back to the Eighties/Nineties early age of techno." The Irish Times' Jim Carroll described the release's sound as "tough, thumping, bleepy electro and industrial techno".

== Critical reception ==
Professional ratings
Aggregate scores
Source	Rating
Metacritic	70/100
Review scores
Source	Rating
AllMusic	4/5 stars
Drowned in Sound	8/10
Exclaim!	8/10
The Irish Times	3/5 stars
Mixmag	8/10
Resident Advisor	3.7/5
The Skinny	3/5 stars

Upon its release, Discreet Desires received generally positive reviews from music critics. At Metacritic, which assigns a normalized rating out of 100 to reviews from critics, the album received an average score of 70, which indicates "generally favorable reviews", based on 7 reviews. AllMusic critic Paul Simpson described the record as a "fascinating debut album" and stated that it "demonstrates the right way to transition from an underground, 12"-only electronic producer to a full-scale album artist, greatly expanding upon previous ideas while avoiding sounding overblown and remaining rough and exhilarating." Nick Roseblade of Drowned in Sound wrote: "The melodies are polymerous, and Hauff’s deft technical flourishes mean that different instruments merge in and out of each other to create ever changing, but constant patterns." Labelling the album as "more introverted than Hauff's previous material", Exclaim!'s Daryl Keating "She's attempted to present a unified piece with this album, rather than a selection of similar tracks, and it's a gambit that's paid off in spades."

The Irish Times critic Jim Carroll described the release as "a hugely inventive record which indicates that there’s much more to come in time from Hauff." Mixmag's Joseph Twin wrote: "It may sound dark, cold, gothic and rough around the edges compared to software-produced music, but these sounds have proved over the decades that they will set your synapses alight with delight." Matt McDermott of Resident Advisor stated: "Some of the best moments on Discreet Desires occur when she's flexing these unexpected songwriting chops." The Skinny critic Andrew Gordon thought that "individually, a number of the tracks make strong impressions but digested as a whole, their mechanical repetition and minimal melodic nuance becomes a little wearying."

The album was listed as number 19 on Rolling Stone's list of "20 Best EDM and Electronic Albums of 2015."

== Track listing ==
All tracks are written by Helena Hauff

No.	Title	Length
1.	"Tripartite Pact"	3:16
2.	"Spur"	4:18
3.	"Sworn to Secrecy Part I"	1:41
4.	"L' Homme Mort"	7:17
5.	"Funereal Morality"	4:34
6.	"Piece of Pleasure"	5:24
7.	"Tryst"	6:18
8.	"Sworn to Secrecy Part II"	3:54
9.	"Silver Sand & Boxes of Mould"	3:09
10.	"Dreams in Colour"	1:41
Total length:		41:32

== Personnel ==
Credits adapted from the liner notes of Discreet Desires.

- Helena Hauff – writing, production
