= Glyphic =

Glyphic may refer to:

- "Glyphic" (The Outer Limits), a 1998 episode of TV series The Outer Limits
- Glyphic (album), a 2007 album by Boxcutter
