= Delroy Edwards =

American electronic music producer

- Also known as: DJ Punisher
- Born: Brandon Avery Perlman; 1989 or 1990 (age 35–36)
- Genres: Outsider house; techno; hip-hop; lo-fi
- Occupations: Music producer; DJ; label owner
- Labels: L.I.E.S.; L.A. Club Resource; Gene's Liquor
- Website: soundcloud.com/delroy-edwards

Brandon Avery Perlman (born 1989/1990), known professionally as Delroy Edwards, is an American electronic music producer and DJ based in Los Angeles. According to AllMusic's Paul Simpson, he produces "gritty, lo-fi house tracks in addition to trippy, abstract mixtapes". He is the owner of the record label L.A. Club Resource and runs the underground hip-hop reissue label Gene's Liquor.

Edwards is the son of actor Ron Perlman.

== Early life ==
Edwards was born to actor Ron Perlman and jewelry designer Opal Stone Perlman. His father is Jewish with roots from Hungary and Poland and his mother is Afro-Jamaican. He has an elder sister, Blake Amanda (b. 1984).

Edwards was exposed to different genres of music while growing up, including post-punk, industrial, funk and R&B. Edwards also stated that he frequented noise concerts and listened to KROQ-FM artists and acts such as New Order, Joy Division and Depeche Mode throughout this time. His parents were influential in his early musical development and provided him with his first drum kit; he was trained classically in jazz drumming. His mother, a fan of gangsta rap and dancehall, introduced Edwards to underground hip-hop and cassette culture. He was introduced to house music by a friend of his sister, who taught him how to operate a drum machine.

Edwards briefly attended California Institute of the Arts to study music.

== Career ==
Moving to New York City in 2010, Edwards worked at A1 Records with Ron Morelli, who founded the label L.I.E.S. His debut 12", 4 Club Use Only, was issued on the label in 2012. Releasing a string of EPs on the label, he founded his own imprint, L.A. Club Resource, in 2013. Edwards's chopped and screwed mixtape series, Slowed Down Funk, was issued on the label for free download.

In 2014, The Death of Rave record label issued Teenage Tapes, a compilation of experimental tracks that Edwards recorded back in art school. The same year also saw the debut of Edwards's techno project, DJ Punisher. In 2016, Edwards released the 30-track full-length Hangin' at the Beach on L.A. Club Resource; Resident Advisor's Matt McDermott described it as his "most realized album to date." Its follow up, Rio Grande was issued in 2018. In the same year, he returned to L.I.E.S. with the LP Aftershock, his first with the label since 2013. Edwards also collaborated with Dean Blunt on Desert Sessions, a collection of experimental synthesizer tracks.

In 2020, L.I.E.S. issued his full-length album, Slap Happy.

== Musical style ==
While Edwards is known to employ different genres for his different releases, including house, techno, chopped and screwed, Memphis rap, noise, hardcore and obscure American garage rock, his music is generally characterized by lo-fi production and tape hiss. Pitchfork critic Marc Masters thought that Edwards combines "the faded '80s vibe of Ariel Pink and John Maus with a sharp eye toward what moves bodies on dance floors today," while Kevin Ritchie of Now regarded his work as "avowedly anti-pop, anti-digital and anti-glam in its minimalism." His work is often associated with the "outsider house" scene, with his EP 4 Club Use Only being regarded as a defining release of the genre. His Slowed Down Funk mixtape series were heavily influenced by DJ Screw and featured "edits of laid-back Southern rap and '80s R&B grooves filtered through his hazy, lo-fi sensibilities," while Hangin' at the Beach was characterized by "racing new wave-inspired electronic drums and occasional post-punk basslines" that permeated through the record.

According to Shawn Reynaldo of Pitchfork, Edwards's aesthetics are informed by "classic Chicago house and vintage rap tropes."

== Discography ==
Studio albums

- Teenage Tapes (2014)
- Hangin' at the Beach (2016)
- Rio Grande (2018)
- Aftershock (2018)
- Desert Sessions (2018; with Dean Blunt)
- Slap Happy (2020)

EPs

- 4 Club Use Only (2012)
- White Owl (2013)
- Untitled (2013)
- Kickin Butts!! (2015)
- Wagon Wheels (2019)
- Dubonnet (2019)

Mixtapes

- Slowed Down Funk Vol. I (2014)
- Slowed Down Funk Volume II: Hate Is Beneath Me (2014)
- Slowed Down Funk Vol III: Pure Evil (2014)

Singles

- "Heart and Soul" / "Sprk tha Dust" (2012)
- "Untitled" (2013; with FunkinEven)
- "Can U Get With" / "Always (Edit)" / "Untitled" (2014)
- "Heart of Gold (Take 2) Raw Jam" (2015)
- "Stop It Baby" (2017)
- "When I Think" (2018)
