= Actress (musician) =

British electronic musician (born 1979)

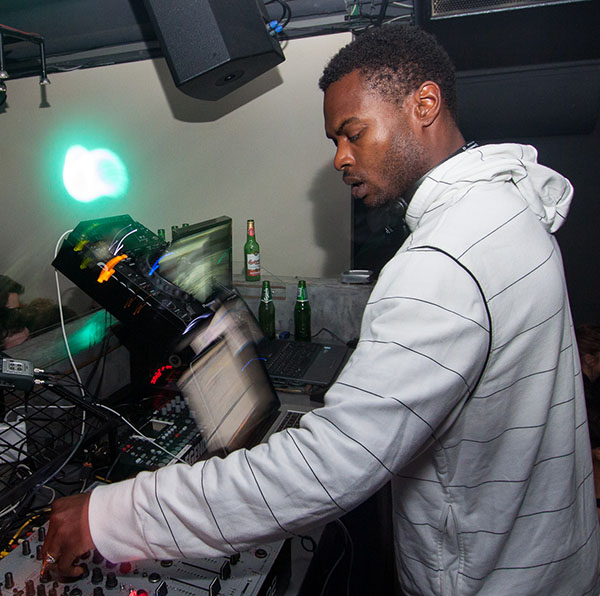
- Actress, 2012

Background information
- Born: 23 August 1979 (age 47); Wolverhampton, England
- Genres: Electronic; microhouse; experimental techno; ambient
- Years active: 2004–present
- Labels: Werkdiscs; Ninja Tune; Honest Jon's; Nonplus; Shark Men; Prime Numbers
- Website: whoisactress.com

Darren J. Cunningham (born 23 August 1979), known professionally as Actress, is a British electronic musician and DJ.

His albums include Hazyville (2008), Splazsh (2010), R.I.P. (2012), Ghettoville (2014), AZD (2017), LAGEOS (with the London Contemporary Orchestra; 2018), 88 (2020), Karma & Desire (2020); released on Ninja Tune, Honest Jon's Records, and Werkdiscs, a label he co-founded in 2004, and LXXXVIII (2023); released on Ninja Tune, and Statik (2024); via Smalltown Supersound. Splazsh was named best album of the year by The Wire. Grey Interiors (2025); a 20-minute electronic music composition and installation piece in collaboration with the Los Angelese digital art studio Actual Objects; via Smalltown Supersound.

== Early life ==
Darren J. Cunningham was born 23 August 1979 in Wolverhampton, England. Growing up, Cunningham was a footballer, signing and playing for West Bromwich Albion F.C. until suffering an injury which derailed his career.

His first introduction to music came through a friend who had a basic music studio set up in his student accommodation. When he went travelling, Cunningham purchased his studio equipment for £200. When he first began making music, Cunningham did not use a metronome, a technique which he says has contributed to how his "style developed".

Cunningham moved to London with the financial assistance from the Professional Footballers Association, where he attended a university for a first degree course in Recording Arts. Cunningham used the money for tuition to purchase synthesizers instead.

== Career ==
In 2004, Following his early experiences in music and his subsequent immersion into the London club scene, Actress founded the label Werk Discs. The label started as a club night and has gone on to discover and release music by artists such as Helena Hauff, disrupt, Zomby, and Cunningham's own releases. During this early period of Cunningham's career, he remixed various productions, wrote for Soma Records and released singles and EPs through Prime Numbers and Nonplus.

Cunningham's debut album, Hazyville, was released originally by Werk Discs on 28 November 2008, and later under both Ninja Tune and Werk Discs in January 2014. PopMatters described it as a "clear winner" and it was retrospectively described on Tiny Mix Tapes as one of 2008's "most slept-on electronic releases". The album was the first of Cunningham's discography to be originally released by Werk Discs in collaboration with Ninja Tune.

Cunningham's second album Splazsh, released 8 June 2010, was placed on numerous publications' end-of-year lists, including Fact and Resident Advisor, placing 3rd and 4th respectively. On top of this, the album topped The Wire's "2010 Rewind" list. Additionally, the album was placed 91st on Pitchfork's "100 Best Albums of the Decade So Far". It was also his first album to be released by Honest Jon's, a British record label jointly founded by Damon Albarn as an offshoot of the Honest Jon's Record shop. Actress later traveled to the Democratic Republic of The Congo alongside Albarn to record Kinshasa One Two, which was released a year later in 2011 to benefit Oxfam's work in Congo.

On 20 April 2012, R.I.P. was released. It was the second album of Cunningham's to be released on the Honest Jon's imprint. The album received the Best New Album designation from Pitchfork, and was placed third on The Wire's 2012 annual critics' poll. The album was notable for displaying a shift in the musical direction for Actress, and was described as almost feeling "like another artist entirely" by Drowned in Sound, who also described it as "the most fully realised, ambitious and rewarding project that Cunningham has yet put to record".

Many thought Ghettoville, Cunningham's fourth album, to be his last, due to the preceding press-release in which he described the album as a "black tinted conclusion of the Actress image", and signed the message off with 'R.I.P. Music 2014'. The album was released collaboratively by both Cunningham's own label, Werkdiscs, and Ninja Tune, and went on to reach number 20 on the Billboard Chart's Top Dance/Electronic albums. It has been described as sitting "at the point of convergence for all of electronic music's most cutting-edge sounds, incorporating pieces of them all and feeling out the unexpected ways they synchronize." For Cunningham's live performances of the album, he commissioned artists such as Riyo Nemeth, William Stein, and Nic Hamilton to create visual interpretations of each of the album's tracks. Stein's visual interpretation of the album would be used for the album's artwork.

On 14 April 2017, Actress released AZD, his fifth studio album. The album was described by Thea Ballard, writing for Pitchfork, as an album that explores "Cunningham's clubbiest and most avant-garde impulses, exploring language and Afrofuturism while maintaining a musicality that holds the listener close." Resident Advisor opined that "Cunningham can once again produce mirage-like moment[s] of beauty like nobody else". The album entered the UK Albums Chart at number 45, reaching number 3 on the UK Electronic iTunes Album Chart, number 5 on the US Electronic iTunes Album Chart, and number 6 on the German Electronic iTunes Album Charts.

In October 2017, Actress was invited by the British Arts Council to perform a multimedia interpretation of Steve Reich's Different Trains to mark the 70th anniversary of Indian independence. Titled Different trains 1947, the performance was a collaborative piece between Actress, Jack Barnett (These New Puritans), Indian music producer Sandunes, percussionist Jivraj Singh and vocalist Priya Purushothaman, and filmmakers/artists Iain Forsyth and Jane Pollard, who performed a new audiovisual composition in response to the events of 1947.

On 26 May 2018, Actress collaborated with the London Contemporary Orchestra, performing to a sold-out audience at the Barbican, London. In 2018, the recordings of this performance were compiled and released as an album titled LAGEOS, described by The Guardian as formulating "a new sonic palette that is in equal measures intriguing and unsettling."

On 15 May 2019, Actress performed a musical and artistic tribute to Karlheinz Stockhausen in a show named 'Sin (x)', performed at the Royal Festival Hall in London.

On 16 July 2020, Actress released an album titled 88 on Bandcamp. The record was uploaded as a 49 minute single.

On 1 September 2020, Actress released the single "Walking Flames" with Sampha on vocals. Also that month, he remixed LEYA's song "Wave” from the duo's LP Flood Dream.

On 23 October 2020, Actress released his eighth album, Karma & Desire, with Ninja Tune. The album was included in Pitchfork's 41 Most Anticipated Albums of Fall 2020. Accompanying its release, Actress released a short film named after the album. The film was directed by Lee Bootee and includes appearances from Sampha, Zsela and Aura T-09 who all feature on the album. The album reached number 4 on the UK electronic album charts and was well received by critics, with Actress being acclaimed for further developing his sound. Bandcamp described it as "warmer and more generous than anything he's released to date", and in a 10/10 review, Future Music added it is "a masterpiece of ethereal, smudged contemporary electronic music" and "perhaps Actress' most accomplished work to date". Karma & Desire was included in The Guardian's 50 best albums of 2020 and reached number 31 in Clash's Albums of the Year 2020 list. Karma & Desire was nominated for A2IM's 2021 Libera Award for Best Dance/Electronic Album.

== Exhibition work ==
In March 2012, shortly before the release of R.I.P., Cunningham performed alongside Koreless and Lapalux as part of a Tate Modern exhibition dedicated to the work of Japanese artist Yayoi Kusama.

Actress participated in Alternative Perceptions in September 2012 at Tate Modern, a collaboration with Matthew Herbert and several other artists such as Moiré, Purple Ferdinand, Kae Tempest and Knit the City. Cunningham went on to collaborate with choreographer Eddie Peake and visual artist Nic Hamilton in August 2013 for a collaborative multimedia performance at St John-at-Hackney. Titled A Shared Cultural Memory, the piece was billed as "audio-visual experiences in direct response to the architecture and atmosphere of the Church."

In September 2021, Actress debuted the audiovisual piece entitled Grey Interiors, in collaboration with the Actual Objects art collective, at the Zeiss-Großplanetarium as part of The New Infinity event at Berlin Art Week. "The three-part composition shows our civilization as an imploded space without recognizable gravity, of which only floating machine fragments and rotting objects remain as quotations without a reference system."

== Discography ==
=== Albums ===
- Hazyville (2008, Werkdiscs; 2014 Werkdiscs / Ninja Tune)
- Splazsh (2010, Honest Jon's)
- R.I.P. (2012, Honest Jon's)
- Ghettoville (2014, Werkdiscs / Ninja Tune)
- AZD (2017, Ninja Tune)
- LAGEOS with the London Contemporary Orchestra (2018, Ninja Tune)
- 88 (2020, self-released)
- Karma & Desire (2020, Ninja Tune)
- LXXXVIII (2023, Ninja Tune)
- Statik (2024, Smalltown Supersound)
- Radical Frame (2026, Ninja Tune)

==== Live albums ====
- Concrète Waves with Suzanne Ciani (2026, Werkdiscs)

=== Singles and EPs ===
- "No Tricks" (2004, Werk Discs)
- "Ghosts Have a Heaven" (2009, Prime Numbers)
- "Machine and Voice" (2010, Nonplus)
- "Paint, Straw and Bubbles" / "Maze" (2010, Honest Jon's)
- "Harrier ATTK" / "Gershwin" (2011, Nonplus)
- "Rainy Dub" / "Faceless" (2011, Honest Jon's)
- "Silver Cloud" (2013, Werkdiscs / Ninja Tune)
- "Grey Over Blue" (2013, Werkdiscs / Ninja Tune)
- "Xoul" (2014, Werkdiscs / Ninja Tune)
- "X22RME" (2017, Ninja Tune)
- Young Paint (as Young Paint) (2018, Werk)
- "Audio Track 5" (w/ London Contemporary Orchestra) (2018, Ninja Tune)
- "Loveless / Angels Pharmacy" (2020, Ninja Tune)
- "Walking Flames" (feat. Sampha) (2020, Ninja Tune)
- "AZD SURF" with Mount Kimbie and Kai Campos (2022, Ninja Tune)
- Dummy Corporation (2022, Ninja Tune)
- "Dolphin Spray / Static" (2024, Smalltown Supersound)
- "THRASH" with Simon J Karis (2024, Nice Music Label)
- Дарен Дж. Каннінгем (2024, Smalltown Supersound)
- Grey Interiors (2025, Smalltown Supersound)
- Tranzkript 1 (2025, Modern Obscure Music)
- "Live by You" (feat. CASISDEAD) (2026, Ninja Tune)
- "Overchord" (2026, Ninja Tune)

=== Remixes ===
- Alex Smoke – "Make My Day (Actress Remix)" (2006, Soma)
- Various Production – "Lost (Actress Remix)" (2008, Various Production)
- Tom Trago – "Lost In The Streets Of NYC (Actress Remix)" (2009, Rush Hour)
- Joy Orbison – "The Shrew Would Have Cushioned The Blow (Actress' Neu Haus So-Glo Mix)" (2010, Aus Music)
- Kode9 – "You Don't Wash (Dub) (DJ-Kicks) (Actress's Negril Mix)" (2010, !K7)
- Panda Bear – "Surfer's Hymn (Actress Primitive Patterns Remix)" (2011, Kompakt)
- Radiohead – "Give Up The Ghost (Thriller Houseghost RMX)" (2011, XL)
- Tallulah Rendall – "Colorblind (Actress Remix)" (2011, Transducer)
- Kasabian – "Narcotic Farm (Actress's Mad House Mix)" (2012, Columbia)
- Kodiak – "Spreo Superbus (Actress Uræus Remix)" (2012, Numbers)
- John Cale – "Perfection (Reflection Mix)" (2012, Double Six)
- Teengirl Fantasy – "Motif (Actress #! Remix)" (2012, R&S)
- Legowelt – "Elementz Of Houz Music (Actress Mix 1 / Mix 2)" (2013, Jack For Daze)
- Terrence Dixon as Population One – "Self Portrait (Actress Remix)" (2013, Monique Musique)
- Neon Indian – "The Blindside Kiss (Actress Remix)" (2013, Transgressive)
- Dinos Chapman – "I'm This Idiot (Actress Remix)" (2013, The Vinyl Factory)
- Moiré – "Lose It (Actress Remix)" (2013, Ninja Tune)
- Forever Forever – "Play Fights (Actress Remix)" (2014, Cult Music)
- Tricky – "Sun Down (Actress Tes Remix)" (2014, False Idols)
- Kelis – "Rumble (Actress Sixinium Bootleg Remix)" (2014, Ninja Tune)
- Panes – "Bones Without You (Actress 'Constellations on the Wall' Remix)" (2014, Brown Rice)
- Wiley – "From The Outside (Actress's Generation 4 Constellation Mix)" (2015, Big Dada)
- Sporting Life, Evy Jane – "Court Vision (Actress Remix)" (2016, R&S)
- Joji – "Window (Actress Remix)" (2018, 88rising / Empire)
- Daniel Avery – "Slow Fade (Actress Remix)" (2018, PIAS)
- Galya Bisengalieva – "Tulpar (Actress 26 Drones Remix)" (2019, NOMAD)
- The Cinematic Orchestra – "A Promise (Actress' The Sky Of Your Heart Will Rain Mix 2)" (2020, Ninja Tune)
- LEYA – "Wave (Actress Remix)" (2020, NNA Tapes)
- Soccer Mommy – "crawling in my skin (Actress remix)" (2020, Loma Vista)
- Para One – "Shin Sekai (Actress Remix)" (2021, Animal63)
- Son Of Philip – "Rubber Stamp (Actress Remix)" (2021, Wigflex)
- Agat – "I've Done It Again (Actress Remix)" (2021, Agat Paz Schwarz)
- Perfume Genius – "One More Try (Actress Remix)" (2021, Matador)
- Kelsey Lu & Yves Tumor feat. Kelly Moran and Moses Boyd – "let all the poisons that lurk in the mud seep out (Actress Remix)" (2021, Hydroharmonia / No Tracks)
- Galya Bisengalieva – "Barsa-Kelmes (Actress Remix)" (2021, One Little Independent)
- Kaleida – "Think (Actress Tone Two Remix)" (2021, Lex)
- Carmen Villain – "Carmen Villain (Actress Remix)" (2021, Smalltown Supersound)
- BAD WITH PHONES – "Living & Surfing (Actress Remix)" (2022, Don't Sleep)
- Tirzah – “Sink In (Actress Remix)” (2022, Domino Recording)
- Catching Flies – "Halo (Actress' Untitled Mix) (2024, Indigo Soul)
- Low End Activist – "TWOC (Actress Remix)" (2025, Sneaker Social Club)

=== Other albums ===
- Kinshasa One Two with Damon Albarn and DRC Music (2011, Warp)
- Unclassified (2011, Williams Street)
- DJ-Kicks: Actress (2015, !K7)
