= Splazsh =

Studio album by Actress
- Released: 8 June 2010
- Genres: Electronic; outsider house
- Length: 61:52
- Label: Honest Jon's

Actress chronology
| Hazyville (2008) | Splazsh (2010) | R.I.P. (2012) |

Splazsh is the second studio album by British electronic musician Actress. It was released on 8 June 2010 by Honest Jon's Records.

== Critical reception ==
Professional ratings
Aggregate scores
| Source | Rating |
|---|---|
| Metacritic | 71/100 |
Review scores
| Source | Rating |
| AllMusic | 5/5 stars |
| Fact | 5/5 |
| Financial Times | 4/5 stars |
| MusicOMH | 4/5 stars |
| Pitchfork | 8.3/10 |
| Q | 2/5 stars |
| Resident Advisor | 4.5/5 |
| Spin | 8/10 |
| Uncut | 3/5 stars |
| URB | 4/5 stars |

=== Accolades ===
Splazsh was ranked on numerous music critics' and publications' end-of-year albums lists, topping The Wire's "2010 Rewind", as well as being in the top five of Fact, Los Angeles Times critic Jeff Weiss and Resident Advisor. It was also put as an honorable mention on the lists of XLR8R and Pitchfork, which in 2014 listed the album number 91 on their "100 Best Albums of the Decade So Far".

| Publication/Author | Country | Accolade | Year | Rank |
|---|---|---|---|---|
| Fact | United Kingdom | The 40 Best Albums of 2010 | 2010 | 3 |
| Los Angeles Times (Jeff Weiss) | United States | Favorite Albums of 2010 | 2010 | 5 |
| Resident Advisor | United States | Top 20 Albums of 2010 | 2010 | 4 |
| Slate | United States | The Best Albums of 2010 | 2010 | * |
| Uncut | United Kingdom | The Wild Mercury Sound 100 Of 2010 | 2010 | 98 |
| The Wire | United Kingdom | 2010 Rewind | 2011 | 1 |
| Pitchfork | United States | The 100 Best Albums of the Decade So Far (2010–14) | 2014 | 91 |
* denotes an unordered list.

== Track listing ==
| No. | Title | Length |
|---|---|---|
| 1. | "Hubble" | 8:48 |
| 2. | "Lost" | 6:08 |
| 3. | "Futureproofing" | 1:15 |
| 4. | "Bubbles Butts and Equations" | 5:33 |
| 5. | "Always Human" | 2:57 |
| 6. | "Get Ohn" | 6:44 |
| 7. | "Maze" | 5:21 |
| 8. | "Purrple Splazsh" | 3:28 |
| 9. | "Senorita" | 2:10 |
| 10. | "Let's Fly" | 6:10 |
| 11. | "Wrong Potion" | 3:12 |
| 12. | "Supreme Cunnilingus" | 2:36 |
| 13. | "The Kettle Men" | 5:01 |
| 14. | "Casanova" | 2:29 |
| Total length: | | 61:52 |
