= AZD =

AZD may refer to:

- airport code for Shahid Sadooghi Airport
- Azd, tribe of ancient Arabs
- AZD (album), a music album
- AŽD Praha, Czech railway company
- ΑΞΔ, shortcut for Alpha Xi Delta
- language code for Mexicanero language
