= Lonely at the Top =

Lonely at the Top may refer to:

== Songs ==
- "Lonely at the Top" (song), 2023, by Asake
- "Lonely at the Top", a song by Bon Jovi from their album 100,000,000 Bon Jovi Fans Can't Be Wrong
- "Lonely at the Top", a song by Chamillionaire from his album Mixtape Messiah 7
- "Lonely at the Top", a song by J. Cole from his album The Fall-Off
- "Lonely at the Top", a song by Mick Jagger from his album She's the Boss
- "Lonely at the Top", a song by the Ordinary Boys from the album How to Get Everything You Ever Wanted in Ten Easy Steps
- "Lonely at the Top", a song by Randy Newman from his album Sail Away
- "Lonely at the Top", a song by Van Morrison from his album No Guru, No Method, No Teacher

== Albums ==
- Lonely at the Top (Lukid album), 2012
- Lonely at the Top (Joey Badass album), 2025
- Lonely at the Top: The Best of Randy Newman, a 1987 album
- Lonely at the Top, a 1984 album by Hermine Demoriane

== Other uses ==
- "Lonely at the Top" (The Morning Show), a 2019 television episode
