= Arecibo Message (album) =

Studio album by Boxcutter
- Released: 20 April 2009
- Genre: Electronic, experimental, dubstep
- Length: 43:05
- Label: Planet Mu Records
- Producer: Barry Lynn

Boxcutter chronology
Glyphic (2007)	Arecibo Message (2009)	The Dissolve (2011)

Arecibo Message is the third album by electronic musician Boxcutter.

== Track listing ==
1. Boxcutter – "Sidetrak" 4:03
2. Boxcutter – "Mya Rave v2" 4:10
3. Boxcutter – "Arecibo Message" 4:25
4. Boxcutter – "S P A C E B A S S" 3:53
5. Boxcutter – "Arcadia 202" 3:13
6. Boxcutter – "Old School Astronomy" 4:32
7. Boxcutter – "A Familiar Sound" 4:34
8. Boxcutter – "Free House Acid" 4:14
9. Boxcutter – "Sidereal Day" 3:29
10. Led Piperz – "Otherside Remix" (Earth Is My Spaceship) 4:10
11. Boxcutter – "Lamp Post Funk" 2:47
12. Boxcutter – "Kab 28" 2:50
13. Boxcutter – "A Cosmic Parent" 2:47
