= AZD (album) =

Studio album by Actress
- Released: 14 April 2017
- Genres: Electronic; experimental techno
- Length: 55:15
- Label: Ninja Tune
- Producer: Darren Cunningham

Actress chronology
Ghettoville (2014)	AZD (2017)	Karma & Desire (2020)

Professional ratings
Aggregate scores
Source	Rating
AnyDecentMusic?	7.5/10
Metacritic	81/100
Review scores
Source	Rating
AllMusic	4/5 stars
The A.V. Club	A
Financial Times	4/5 stars
The Guardian	4/5 stars
NME	3/5 stars
The Observer	3/5 stars
Pitchfork	7.9/10
Q	4/5 stars
Record Collector	4/5 stars
Resident Advisor	4.2/5

AZD (pronounced "Azid") is the fifth studio album by British electronic musician Actress (real name Darren Cunningham). It was released on 14 April 2017 on Ninja Tune Records. Upon its announcement, the video for the lead single "X22RME" was released on Ninja Tune's YouTube channel. AZD is Actress's fifth album. The preceding album, Ghettoville, had been suspected to have been his last.

As an artist, Actress has always been considered vague in regards to the intentions behind his actions and albums. Christian Eede of The Quietus writes that while a common theme of Cunningham's albums reportedly experienced by listeners is death and a downbeat vibe, AZD shows Actress in a more humorous and open light.

Cunningham tends to give vague titles to his music works to give his audience a glimpse of what the concept of the pieces are instead of fully revealing his thoughts on his songs.

The album has a central concept of the sound associated with 'chrome'. Chrome can represent futuristic ideals while also conveying coldness which in turn could represent human dissociation. Even with this, AZD is a big change in terms of energy from past albums. Its energy is described and felt as higher, as it is not as gloomy or dark as his others.

== Track listing ==
Track listing adapted from Ninja Tune's website.

All tracks are written by Darren J. Cunningham.

No.	Title	Length
1.	"Nimbus"	0:54
2.	"Untitled 7"	5:13
3.	"Fantasynth"	5:02
4.	"Blue Window"	3:42
5.	"Cyn"	3:18
6.	"X22RME"	5:04
7.	"Runner"	5:12
8.	"Falling Rizlas"	2:25
9.	"Dancing in the Smoke"	6:21
10.	"Faure in Chrome"	6:02
11.	"There's an Angel in the Shower"	7:33
12.	"Visa"	4:29
Total length:		55:15
