= Qualm (album) =

Studio album by Helena Hauff
- Released: 3 August 2018
- Genre: Techno; acid; EBM; cold wave
- Length: 56:36
- Label: Ninja Tune
- Producer: Helena Hauff

Helena Hauff chronology
| Discreet Desires (2015) | Qualm (2018) | Living with Ants (2019) |

Qualm is the second studio album by German electronic music DJ and record producer Helena Hauff. It was released on 3 August 2018 by Ninja Tune. The album was critically acclaimed and the track "Hyper-Intelligent Genetically Enriched Cyborg" was named as one of the best electronic tracks of 2018 by Pitchfork. In comparison to her previous album, Discreet Desires (2015), the tracks on it had more traditional song structure and they were "more poppier."

== Production ==
While creating the album, Hauff used one synthesizer, which was Roland TR-808, and one drum machine.

== Title ==
The title has multiple definitions. The German meaning of "qualm" is "smoke" or "fumes", as in English language, it is "an uneasy feeling of doubt, worry, or fear."

== Critical reception ==
Professional ratings
Aggregate scores
| Source | Rating |
|---|---|
| AnyDecentMusic? | 7.6/10 |
| Metacritic | 82/100 |
Review scores
| Source | Rating |
| AllMusic | 4/5 stars |
| The A.V. Club | B+ |
| Clash | 8/10 |
| Financial Times | 4/5 stars |
| The Guardian | 5/5 stars |
| The Independent | 4/5 stars |
| Pitchfork | 7.8/10 |
| Q | 4/5 stars |
| Resident Advisor | 3.0/5 |
| Uncut | 7/10 |

Qualm received positive reviews from music critics. At Metacritic, which assigns a normalised rating out of 100 to reviews from mainstream critics, the album received an average score of 82, based on 15 reviews, which indicates "universal acclaim". Philip Sherburne of Pitchfork stated that Qualm is a "spartan mix of techno, acid, EBM, and coldwave". Nathan Wesley of The Line of Best Fit opined that the album is a "nocturnal, adventurous album that sees Hauff take a progressive leap forward from her 2015 debut Discreet Desires." Andrew Moore of Clash remarked that Qualm is a "statement of romantic infatuation amongst an otherwise hash, twisted and raw landscape. A glance into the past and a look to the future." Tom Ewing of Freaky Trigger believed that Hauff's "clattering, muscular techno might be better in a more bracing, high-volume environment, delivering an icy January shock – under the duvet, late at night, the rackety rhythms have the same comforting steadiness of near-passing trains."

== Track listing ==
All tracks are written by Helena Hauff.

| No. | Title | Length |
|---|---|---|
| 1. | "Barrow Boot Boys" | 6:04 |
| 2. | "Lifestyle Guru" | 5:43 |
| 3. | "Btdr-Revisited" | 3:29 |
| 4. | "Entropy Created You and Me" | 2:42 |
| 5. | "Fag Butts in the Fire Bucket" | 4:03 |
| 6. | "Hyper-Intelligent Genetically Enriched Cyborg" | 6:03 |
| 7. | "The Smell of Suds and Steel" | 8:11 |
| 8. | "Primordial Sludge" | 5:33 |
| 9. | "Qualm" | 2:33 |
| 10. | "No Qualms" | 3:22 |
| 11. | "Panegyric" | 5:19 |
| 12. | "It Was All Fields Around Here When I Was a Kid" | 3:34 |

Notes

- "Btdr-Revisited" is stylised in lowercase letters.

== Personnel ==
Credits adapted from the liner notes of Qualm.

- Helena Hauff – writing, production, arrangement
- BüroBrüggmann – design
- Florian Hammerl – photography
