= Lonely at the Top (Lukid album) =

Studio album by Lukid
- Released: 22 October 2012 (UK); 30 October 2012 (Worldwide)
- Genre: Electronic
- Label: Werkdiscs

Lukid chronology
Chord (2010)	Lonely at the Top (2012)

Professional ratings
Aggregate scores
Source	Rating
Metacritic	78/100
Review scores
Source	Rating
MusicOMH	4/5 stars
Clash	8/10
XLR8R	7/10
Resident Advisor	3.5/5 stars

Lonely at the Top is the fourth album by British electronic producer, Lukid. It was released in October 2012 by Werkdiscs.

== Music videos ==
The music video for the song Lonely at the Top features an animation by WendyVainity, an artist from Adelaide, South Australia

== Track list ==
No.	Title	Length
1.	"Bless My Heart"
2.	"Manchester"
3.	"Lonely at the Top"
4.	"Snow Theme"
5.	"This Dog Can Swim"
6.	"Southpaw"
7.	"Tomorrow"
8.	"Riquelme"
9.	"USSR"
10.	"The Life of the Mind"
11.	"Laroche"
12.	"Talk to Strangers"
13.	"Uptown Girl"
14.	"Daphne On Horseback"
15.	"How Clean Is Your House? (Japanese Bonus Track)"
