= Galya Bisengalieva =

Kazakh-British musician

- Born: Almaty, Kazakhstan
- Genres: Classical; contemporary; electronic
- Occupation: Musician
- Instrument: Violin
- Labels: NOMAD Music Productions; One Little Independent
- Website: bisengalieva.com

Galya Bisengalieva is a Kazakh-British violinist. Improvisor, collaborator and leader of the London Contemporary Orchestra based in London.

== Biography ==
Born in Almaty, Kazakhstan, Galya studied at the Royal Academy of Music and Royal College of Music. She has performed solo shows throughout Europe, USA, India, Turkey, Brazil and made her sell out debut in Teatro Col, Buenos Aires where Galya received the Revelation Award by the Music Critics Association of Argentina.

Galya toured Brahm's Violin Concerto as part of There Will be Blood: Live and premiered Edmund Finnis' Shades Lengthen on BBC Radio 3.

She has collaborated with Steve Reich, Laurie Spiegel, Suzanne Ciani, Terry Riley, Pauline Oliveros as well as commissioning and performing new works by Shiva Feshareki, Claire M Singer, Emilie Levienaise-Farrouch, Mica Levi and CHAINES.

Galya leads the London Contemporary Orchestra and can be heard on Radiohead's A Moon Shaped Pool, Lynne Ramsay's Cannes Film Festival Winner You Were Never Really Here, Thom Yorke's film score for the upcoming remake Suspiria, Frank Ocean's Blond, and Oscar-nominated Phantom Thread.

Recently she co-wrote the track "Galya Beat" with Actress a.k.a. Darren Cunningham and Sam Wilson, released as part of the LP LAGEOS on Ninja Tune Records.

She released her debut solo EP, EP One on NOMAD Music Productions on 30 November 2018. This was reviewed by notable publications Pitchfork and The Quietus.

Galya Bisengalieva was featured by Kazakhstan national newspaper Tengrinews in April 2015.
