= Oneiric (album) =

Studio album by Boxcutter
- Released: 17 April 2006
- Genre: Electronic, dubstep
- Length: 1:05:24
- Label: Planet Mu Records
- Producer: Barry Lynn

Boxcutter chronology
Oneiric (2006)	Glyphic (2007)

Oneiric is the debut album by electronic musician Boxcutter (Barry Lynn). The word oneiric means "of or pertaining to dreams; resembling a dream, dreamlike".

This release established Boxcutter's experimental breaks and bass-driven style of music, which at first appraisal was labeled as dubstep because of its similar 2-step rhythms and warped basslines. However, comparisons were also drawn to IDM in that most tracks featured heavy use of effects and processed samples of live instrumentation. "Tauhid", for instance, begins with a distorted flute sample that intercuts throughout the track, while "Sunshine V.I.P." features choppy, rapid-fire beat sequencing sourced from live drums in addition to a flute melody.

Lynn says of his approach to musicmaking:

I write my music on anything that comes to hand – tracks can start with a breakbeat idea that's been programmed in a sequencer, a melodic phrase on the guitar, a MIDI doodle or a sound I've processed and shaped with DSP software.

The track "Hyloz" was used in Amon Tobin's live mix set during his Foley Room tour in 2007, though it is mistakenly listed as "Grub" on the subsequent release.

== Track listing ==
1. "Tauhid" – 5:40
2. "Grub" – 6:18
3. "Skuff'd" – 5:17
4. "Gave Dub" – 4:28
5. "Brood" – 5:40
6. "Mossy" – 5:20
7. "Rikta" – 5:11
8. "Sunshine V.I.P." – 6:26
9. "Bad You Do" – 6:13
10. "Silver Birch Solstice" – 5:29
11. "Hyloz" – 5:12
12. "Chlorophyll" – 4:10
