= R.I.P. (Actress album) =

Studio album by Actress
- Released: 23 April 2012
- Genres: Ambient; electronic; techno
- Length: 56:59
- Label: Honest Jon's

Actress chronology
Splazsh (2010)	R.I.P. (2012)	Ghettoville (2014)

R.I.P. is the third studio album by British electronic musician Actress. It was released on 23 April 2012 on Honest Jon's Records.

== Critical reception ==
Professional ratings
Aggregate scores
Source	Rating
AnyDecentMusic?	8.1/10
Metacritic	81/100
Review scores
Source	Rating
AllMusic	4.5/5 stars
Clash	9/10
Fact	4.5/5
The Irish Times	4/5 stars
Mixmag	4/5
NME	8/10
Pitchfork	8.5/10
Resident Advisor	4.5/5
Rolling Stone	3.5/5 stars
Spin	8/10

R.I.P. holds a score of 81 out of 100 on the review aggregate website Metacritic based on reviews from 21 critics, indicating "universal acclaim". The album placed third in The Wire's annual critics' poll.

== Track listing ==
No.	Title	Length
1.	"R.I.P."	1:16
2.	"Ascending"	3:08
3.	"Holy Water"	1:39
4.	"Marble Plexus"	4:42
5.	"Uriel's Black Harp"	2:27
6.	"Jardin"	6:07
7.	"Serpent"	3:56
8.	"Shadow from Tartarus"	5:26
9.	"Tree of Knowledge"	4:09
10.	"Raven"	5:04
11.	"Glint"	0:37
12.	"Caves of Paradise"	4:15
13.	"The Lord's Graffiti"	3:04
14.	"N.E.W."	5:28
15.	"Iwaad"	5:41
Total length:		56:59
