= Statik (album) =

2024 album by Actress

Studio album by Actress
- Released: June 7, 2024
- Length: 47:42
- Label: Smalltown Supersound
- Producer: Darren J. Cunningham

Actress chronology
LXXXVIII (2023)	Statik (2024)

Statik is the tenth studio album by British electronic musician Actress, released 7 June 2024 via Smalltown Supersound.

== Background ==
Composed during what the artist described as an "extensive flow state", Statik is Actress' first full-length project through Smalltown Supersound; his previous album, LXXXVIII was released via Ninja Tune. The album was announced on 25 April 2024 with the release of two singles, "Dolphin Spray" and "Static", along with a full track listing.

== Critical reception ==
Professional ratings
Aggregate scores
Source	Rating
Metacritic	76/100
Review scores
Source	Rating
AllMusic	3.5/5 stars
Pitchfork	7.9/10

Statik received a score of 76 out of 100 on review aggregator Metacritic based on four critics' reviews, indicating "generally favorable reviews".

Dash Lewis of Pitchfork characterized Statik as "soft and unsettling", praising the album's ability to evoke "dread-filled anticipation". Daniel Bromfield of Resident Advisor described the album as Actress' most "accessible" work to date and noted that while Cunningham was "at the peak of his powers", Statik offered a more subdued experience for listeners. Reviewing the album for AllMusic, Andy Kellman claimed that, "For the listener familiar with Cunningham's past, nothing here is likely to sound novel. It might be surprising how often it verges on "coffee table," though any lounging it inspires would be at least a little uneasy, like waiting for a curfew to lift or a state of emergency to expire."

== Track listing ==
All tracks are written by Darren J. Cunningham.

Statik track listing
No.	Title	Length
1.	"Hell"	6:15
2.	"Static"	1:35
3.	"My Ways"	1:27
4.	"Rainlines"	3:50
5.	"Ray"	5:34
6.	"Six"	3:07
7.	"Cafe del Mars"	6:48
8.	"Dolphin Spray"	4:43
9.	"System Verse"	4:33
10.	"Doves Over Atlantis"	6:03
11.	"Mellow Checx"	3:47
Total length:		47:42

== Personnel ==
- Darren J. Cunningham – production, mixing
- Noel Summerville – mastering
- Blank Blank Studio – design
- Ola Rindal – photography

== Charts ==
Chart performance for Statik
Chart (2024)	Peak position
UK Album Downloads (OCC)	70
