= Antix (rapper) =

British–Jordanian hip hop artist (active from 2010)

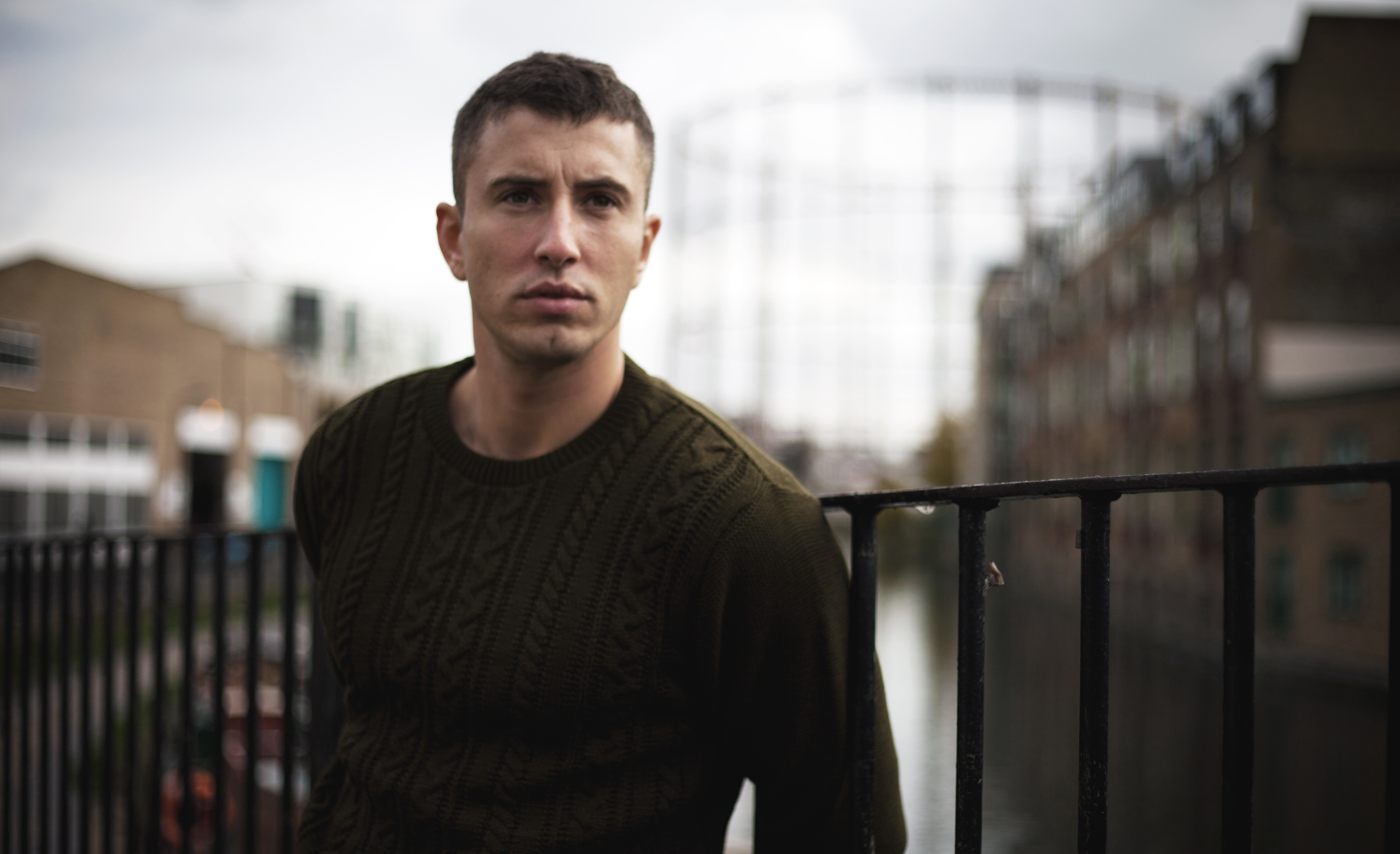

Background information
- Born: Alex Nimier
- Origin: London, England
- Genres: Hip hop music; British hip hop
- Occupation: Rapper
- Instrument: Vocals
- Years active: 2010–present
- Website: antixofficial.com

Alex Nimier, better known by his stage name Antix, is a British–Jordanian hip hop artist, known for discussing political, social, and personal issues (such as his relationship with his now-deceased mother). Antix released his debut album Flammable Grammar in November 2010. The album received regular circulation from Pandora Radio and garnered Antix a fan base in the United States, particularly with his track 'Hands Up'.

On 31 October 2012, Antix released his follow-up album Question Everything and his debut single 'You're Crazy' entered the Music Week Urban Charts top 20 in August 2013. MTV named him as a shortlist nominee for MTV Brand New later that year.

In 2014, Antix entered the Music Week Urban Charts again, in the top ten, with 'Bad Dreams'. This was the first in a string of break-out singles for Antix, which have led to him being a regular featured artist on VEVO and seeing support from BBC Radio, Red Bull Music and the Huffington Post amongst others.

== Career ==
=== Early life ===
Born in London, Antix grew up living in the UK, France, Jordan and the United States. His early musical influences came from his diverse upbringing, as well as hip-hop artists of the early 1990s onwards such as Nas, 2Pac, the Wu-Tang Clan, Eminem, and Outkast. Antix lost his mother to cancer at the age of seventeen and is now an ambassador for the Rarer Cancer Foundation.

=== 2010–2011: Flammable Grammar ===
His debut studio album, Flammable Grammar was released during 2010. Pandora Radio in the United States gave regular circulation to the album and in particular the track 'Hands Up'. Antix played a number of high-profile shows in Los Angeles such as Hollywood's Whisky a Go Go, performing with artists such as Bone Thugs-n-Harmony and Tha Dogg Pound.

=== 2012–2013: Question Everything ===
In 2013, Antix released 'You're Crazy (2012)' as the lead single from his second studio album Question Everything. The track saw commercial success, reaching No.17 on the UK Music Week Urban Charts. The song, which sampled White Town's 1997 hit "Your Woman", also received airplay on BBC Introducing and was performed on BalconyTV. MTV named Antix as a shortlist nominee for MTV Brand New 2014.

=== 2014–2017: Singles ===
In February 2014, Antix entered the Music Week Urban Charts again, in the top ten, with 'Bad Dreams'. Antix was a featured artist on VEVO with this and his next releases 'Smile' and 'Breathless', the latter which also saw support from Record of the Day and Tom Robinson's Fresh on the Net. His next release 'Come Home' in 2015 was chosen as the BBC Introducing Track of the Week with BBC Three Counties Radio and saw additional support from the likes of Clash Music and Red Bull Music. Antix was also added to the Field Day 2015 line-up, alongside the likes of FKA Twigs, Django Django and Chet Faker, and saw support from publications such as the Huffington Post for his 'Afshin's Song' project. The 'Afshin's Song' project was funded through the PledgeMusic platform.

=== 2021: Everything's Alright ===
In June 2021 Antix sent out an email containing links to his final album 'Everything's Alright.' Available on Spotify, Amazon, Apple Music, and Tidal, the album focuses on love, religion, politics, life and failed plans, unexpected successes, and Antix's exit from rap as a whole.

== Discography ==
Singles

- 2017: When It Falls
- 2015: Is It Too Late For Us? (Spoken Word)
- 2015: Afshin's Song
- 2015: Come Home
- 2014: Breathless
- 2014: Smile
- 2014: Bad Dreams
- 2013: You're Crazy

Albums

- 2021: Everything's Alright
- 2012: Question Everything
- 2010: Flammable Grammar
