= The Dissolve (album) =

Studio album by Boxcutter
- Released: May 2011
- Genre: Electronic
- Label: Planet Mu Records
- Producer: Barry Lynn

Boxcutter chronology
Arecibo Message (2009)	The Dissolve (2011)

Professional ratings
Aggregate scores
Source	Rating
Album of the Year	71/100
AnyDecentMusic?	7.5/10
Metacritic	78/100
Review scores
Source	Rating
Clash	7/10
Cokemachineglow	76%
Fact	3.5/5 stars
Mojo	4/5 stars
musicOMH	4/5 stars
Resident Advisor	3.5/5
Sputnikmusic	3/5
Uncut	4/5 stars

The Dissolve is the fourth studio album by electronic musician Boxcutter.

== Track listing ==
1. Boxcutter Panama
2. Boxcutter Zabriskie Disco
3. Boxcutter ft. Brian Greene All Too Heavy
4. Boxcutter vs. Ken & Ryu Cold War
5. Boxcutter Passerby
6. Boxcutter TV Troubles
7. Boxcutter ft. Brian Greene The Dissolve
8. Boxcutter Factory Setting
9. Boxcutter Topsoil
10. Boxcutter vs. Kab Driver Little Smoke Remix
11. Boxcutter ft. Brian Greene Ufonik
