= Boxcutter (musician) =

- Born: Barry Lynn; 1980 (age 45–46)
- Origin: Northern Ireland
- Genres: IDM, dubstep, contemporary R&B, dub, ambient, drum and bass, jazz
- Occupations: Record producer, DJ, musician, guitarist, bass guitarist
- Instruments: Guitar, bass, synthesizer
- Years active: 2005–present
- Labels: Planet Mu, Hotflush Recordings, Cosmic Bridge, Kinnego Records

Boxcutter is the pseudonym for Barry Lynn (born 1980), an electronic musician from Northern Ireland. Early Boxcutter material from 2005 and 2006, like that released on Hotflush Recordings and on the debut Planet Mu album Oneiric, was frequently associated with the genre dubstep, although it was also compared to experimental artists such as Amon Tobin and Boards of Canada. The second Boxcutter album Glyphic was more influenced by classic dub music such as King Tubby, but also drew comparisons to artists such as Squarepusher, Foul Play and Seefeel, and continued Lynn's reputation for working outside of conventions and taking a genre-hopping approach. In 2009, Lynn released the SETI-themed album Arecibo Message. In the same year, he also founded the Kinnego Records label, on which he released a collaboration with Kinnego Flux (a duo composed of David Baxter and Brian Greene) featuring artwork by London designers La Boca, and the first vinyl single by Space Dimension Controller.

The Dissolve was released in 2011 and scored 78 on Metacritic, with the BBC Review referencing Panda Bear to describe a collaboration with vocalist Brian Greene, and reviewers remarking on the move away from dubstep sonics. Also in 2011, Adult Swim commissioned the track Waiting for the Lights for their {Unclassified} compilation.

Boxcutter released the Gnosis EP on Om Unit's Cosmic Bridge label in December 2013.

Boxcutter has also released music as The Host, including 2012's eponymous album on Planet Mu, and Esalen Lecures on Touch Sensitive Records in 2015. An album of material by Barry Lynn pre-dating the Boxcutter alias was released by Planet Mu in 2008, entitled Balancing Lakes, named after the balancing lakes in Craigavon.

Barry Lynn has collaborated with FaltyDL under the alias NeferTT, releasing the EP Blue Skies Red Soil in 2012 for Hotflush Recordings.

Boxcutter has performed live across Europe and the US, including at Unsound Festival, TodaysArt, Club Transmediale, Bloc Festival, and Decibel Festival. For live shows, Barry often accompanies his electronic music with live electric guitar or bass guitar.

Barry Lynn is the son of the late Correspondence Chess International Master Liam Lynn.

Lynn has a PhD in Astrophysics from Queen's University Belfast and has published research papers for Monthly Notices of the Royal Astronomical Society.

== Discography ==
Singles

- Brood / Sunshine (Hotflush Recordings, 2005)
- Tauhid (Planet Mu, 2006)
- Brood V.I.P. / November Dub (ABUCS, 2006)
- Philly / Endothermic (Hotflush Recordings, 2007)
- Moon Pupils / 2Time (with Kab Driver) (Kinnego Records, 2010)
- Allele / Other People (Planet Mu, 2011)
- Gnosis (Cosmic Bridge, 2013)
- Shea EP (Kinnego Records, 2014)
- Retina Grains (Kinnego Records, 2014)
- New Yen EP (with Defcon) (Kinnego Records, 2014)
- Vatic Dreams (Kinnego Records, 2015)
- Canopy (Kinnego Records, 2016)
- Talamh (Kinnego Records, 2017)
- Alignments (Kinnego Records, 2018)
- Scope (Kinnego Records, 2024)
- Dapple / Eyebeam (Kinnego Records, 2025)

Albums

- Oneiric (Planet Mu, 17 April 2006)
- Glyphic (Planet Mu, 29 October 2007)
- Arecibo Message (Planet Mu, 20 April 2009)
- The Dissolve (Planet Mu, 25 April 2011)
- Sheene (Kinnego Records, 1 November 2018)
- Béaloideas (Kinnego Records, 25 Apr 2020)
- Cirrus Dubs (Kinnego Records, 21 May 2021)

Remixes

- Kitchen Sink (Boxcutter Remix) – Amon Tobin – Kitchen Sink Remixes (Ninja Tune 2007)
- Sparkle (Boxcutter Remix) – Toasty / Elemental – Angel / Sparkle (Remixes) (Hotflush Recordings 2007)
- Conundrum (Boxcutter Autumn Drum Remix) – Wolf & Cub – This Mess (4AD 2007)
- Human Meadow (Boxcutter Remix) – FaltyDL – Human Meadow Remixes (Planet Mu 2009)
- Otherside Remix (Earth Is My Spaceship) – LED Piperz* – Aerial / Otherside (Airflex Labs 2009)
- VCOcation (Boxcutter Remix) – Space Dimension Controller – Unidentified Flying Oscillator (Acroplane Recordings 2009)
- Alpha Beta Gamma (Boxcutter Remix) – Brain Machine – Alpha Beta Gamma Remixes (Titan's Halo Records 2011)
- Suicide Beauty Spot (Boxcutter Remix) – Point B – Suicide Beauty Spot Remixes Part 2 (Combat Recordings 2011)
- Life in the Cloudz (The Host Remix) – DJ Earl – Blue Summer EP (Lil Pitch Records 2012)

As Barry Lynn

- Balancing Lakes (Planet Mu, 18 February 2008)
- Taurus Tapes Vol. I (Touch Sensitive, 28 April 2017)
- Taurus Tapes Vol. II (Touch Sensitive, 28 April 2017)
- '01 – '04 Tracks (Kinnego Records, 15 September 2017)
- Compositions For Software Instruments (Kinnego Records, 27 October 2023)
- Silverwood Selections (Kinnego Records, 27 October 2023)
- First Impressions (Kinnego Records, 27 October 2023)
- Lomography (Kinnego Records, 13 September 2024)
- Divisible (Kinnego Records, 6 February 2026)

As The Host

- The Host (Planet Mu, 20 March 2012)
- Esalen Lectures (Touch Sensitive, 15 August 2015)
- Audience Science (Kinnego Records, 30 October 2015)
