= For Those of You Who Have Never (And Also Those Who Have) =

Studio album by Huerco S.
- Released: June 6, 2016
- Recorded: 2014–2015
- Studios: Wilson Avenue Studios, Brooklyn, New York
- Genres: Ambient; experimental
- Length: 52:39
- Label: Proibito Records
- Producer: Brian Leeds

Huerco S. chronology
Colonial Patterns (2013)	For Those of You Who Have Never (And Also Those Who Have) (2016)	Plonk (2022)

Professional ratings
Aggregate scores
Source	Rating
Metacritic	85/100
Review scores
Source	Rating
AllMusic	4.5/5 stars
Exclaim!	8/10
Pitchfork	8.1/10
Resident Advisor	3.8/5
Sputnikmusic	4.5/5
Tiny Mix Tapes	4.5/5 stars

For Those of You Who Have Never (And Also Those Who Have) is the second studio album from American electronic musician Brian Leeds under the pseudonym Huerco S. and was released by Proibito Records on June 6, 2016. Pitchfork listed the album among their top 50 ambient albums of all time, and top 200 albums of the 2010s.

== Production ==
For Those of You Who Have Never... was produced by Brian Leeds under the pseudonym "Huerco S." in his Brooklyn apartment. The album is a work of ambient music, which was a stylistic departure from his first album, the more rhythmic and techno oriented Colonial Patterns (2013). He decided to stop using external samples as in his earlier work, seeking new ways to express himself.

== Track listing ==
Side A
No.	Title	Length
1.	"A Sea of Love"	7:18
2.	"Lifeblood (Naïve Melody)"	8:13
Total length:		15:31

Side B
No.	Title	Length
1.	"Hear Me Out"	6:07
2.	"Kraanvogel"	5:39
Total length:		11:46

Side C
No.	Title	Length
1.	"On the Embankment"	5:57
2.	"Marked for Life"	3:41
3.	"Cubist Camouflage"	2:41
Total length:		12:19

Side D
No.	Title	Length
1.	"Promises of Fertility"	6:56
2.	"The Sacred Dance"	6:07
Total length:		13:03

== Personnel ==
- Brian Leeds – Composition and production
- Simon Davey – Mastering
- DJ Python – Liner notes
