= Jimothy Lacoste =

British rapper and musician

Jimothy
- Also known as: Jimothy Lacoste
- Born: Timothy Gonzales; London, United Kingdom
- Genres: Hip hop; bedroom pop
- Occupations: Rapper; songwriter
- Instrument: Vocals
- Years active: 2016–present

Timothy Gonzales, best known by his stage name Jimothy Lacoste, is a British rapper and musician from Camden, North London, associated with the bedroom pop and DIY genres.

== Career ==
Lacoste started posting music online in 2016, but his breakthrough track was "Getting Busy", released on YouTube on 28 July 2017. Since then, he has had a series of viral hits, and received considerable media attention in London and from music websites. Lacoste started performing live in 2018, including festivals such as Field Day, where he received positive reviews from The Guardian, which described him as "North London's viral wonderkid".

In early 2019 Jimothy completed his second UK tour, where he performed alongside fellow London rapper V7Backin2007. In 2019, he played at festivals including Cambridge's Strawberries and Creem and Glastonbury, where The Telegraph referred to him as a "viral Internet enigma". He has recently worked with brands such as Adidas and Vogue.

== Music ==
Lacoste's music consists of deadpan vocals laid over lo-fi midi beats. His lyrics reflect an optimistic worldview and usually relate to inane everyday scenarios. A review in The Guardian characterised his music as "absurd iPad pop". The New York Times highlighted the origins of his music and aesthetic in his "lifelong fluency in digital culture". The success of his tracks online has been credited to the low-budget humorous videos that accompany them, which invariably feature Lacoste dancing alone or in idiosyncratic situations, and frequent visual references to public transport. His catchphrase, first mentioned in "Getting Busy", is "Life is getting quite exciting".

== Personal life ==
Lacoste was born in England to a British-Caribbean father and Spanish mother. He has stated in interviews that he has dyscalculia and said that he attended a school for children with special educational needs, which he has credited with giving him confidence and allowing him to follow his interest in music.
