= LXXXVIII (album) =

Studio album by Actress
- Released: 3 November 2023
- Genre: Electronic; experimental techno
- Length: 57:12
- Label: Ninja Tune
- Producer: Darren J. Cunningham

Actress chronology
Karma & Desire (2020)	LXXXVIII (2023)	Statik (2024)

LXXXVIII is the eighth solo studio album by British electronic music producer Actress, released on 3 November 2023 through Ninja Tune. It was inspired by chess and game theory, and received positive reviews from critics.

== Background ==
The album was inspired by chess, with each track title containing a coordinate on a chessboard used in algebraic notation, as well as game theory. Its title is the Roman numeral for 88, which is also the name of a mixtape Actress released in 2020; 88 is included with the 3×LP edition of LXXXVIII.

== Critical reception ==
Professional ratings
Aggregate scores
Source	Rating
Metacritic	82/100
Review scores
Source	Rating
AllMusic	4/5 stars
Pitchfork	7.4/10
The Skinny	4/5 stars

LXXXVIII received a score of 82 out of 100 on review aggregator Metacritic based on six critics' reviews, indicating "universal acclaim". Daniel Bromfield of Pitchfork commented that "there are some remarkably idle stretches on this 57-minute album, which weaves between short dance tracks and long, intractable expanses of stasis; it's the inverse of the typical techno 'artist album,' where the dance tracks are sandwiched between half-baked ambient stocking-stuffers designed to show off the producer's compositional bona fides". AllMusic's Andy Kellman described it as "yet another source of mystification" as "its deconstructions and creative alterations of underground club music forms, combined with crystalline ambient compositions [...] cause more sensations of wonderment, comfort, and unease".

Andrew Ryce of Resident Advisor stated that LXXXVIII "focuses on piano, electronics and voice" as Actress adds "a tinge of jazz to one of dance music's most recognisable sounds, the LP is eclectic and comforting, designed to make you squirm and relax at the same time". Reviewing the album for The Skinny, Patrick Gamble called it "an incredibly unpredictable album, with Cunningham seemingly determined to push his imaginative limits, vivifying his unique brand of experimental techno by cataloguing the possibilities of the genre".

== Track listing ==
All lyrics are written by Darren J. Cunningham, except where noted; all music is composed by Darren J. Cunningham, except where noted.

LXXXVIII track listing
No.	Title	Length
1.	"Push Power (a1)" (lyrics by Jonnine Standish; music by Cunningham and Standish)	4:09
2.	"Hit That Spdiff (b8)"	7:46
3.	"Azd Rain (g1)"	4:43
4.	"Memory Haze (c1)"	3:57
5.	"Game Over (e1)" (lyrics and music by Cunningham and Adam Markiewicz)	3:15
6.	"Typewriter World (c8)"	4:32
7.	"It's Me (g8)"	5:17
8.	"Chill (h2)"	1:11
9.	"Green Blue Amnesia Magic Haze (d7)"	6:25
10.	"Oway (f7)"	5:03
11.	"M2 (f8)" (lyrics and music by Cunningham and Laura Groves)	3:03
12.	"Azifiziks (d8)"	5:08
13.	"Pluto (a2)"	2:43
Total length:		57:12

== Personnel ==
- Darren J. Cunningham – production, mixing
- Noel Summerville – mastering
- Inventory Studio – design

== Charts ==
Chart performance for LXXXVIII
Chart (2023)	Peak position
UK Album Downloads (OCC)	85
UK Dance Albums (OCC)	8
