= Helena Hauff =

German DJ

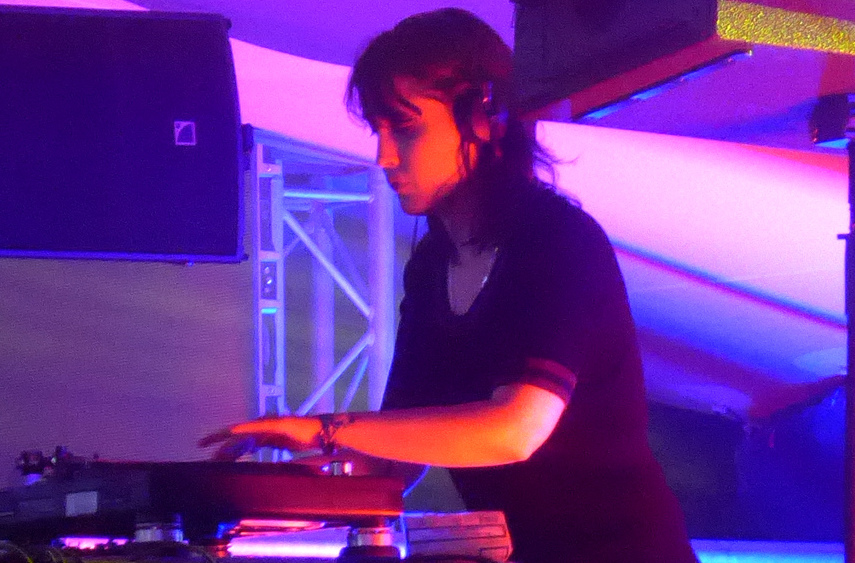
- Hauff performing in Barcelona, Spain in 2016

Background information
- Origin: Hamburg, Germany
- Genres: Techno; electro; acid house
- Occupations: DJ; record producer
- Labels: Werkdiscs; Hypnobeat; Solar One Music; Ninja Tune; L.I.E.S.; Tresor Records
- Website: helena-hauff.com

Helena Hauff is a German DJ and record producer based in Hamburg, Germany. She is known for her "stripped-down techno and electro tracks" that are recorded using strictly analog equipment and draws influences from acid house, EBM and industrial music.

Hauff, who has studied fine art, physics and systematic music science, previously worked as a DJ at Hamburg's Golden Pudel Club, where she hosted a night called Birds and Other Instruments. She released her debut record, Actio Reactio EP, in 2013. Following a series of releases from various different labels, including James Dean Brown's Hypnobeat record label, she released her debut full-length album, Discreet Desires, through Werkdiscs records in 2015. The album was listed as number 19 on Rolling Stone's list of "20 Best EDM and Electronic Albums of 2015."

In December 2017, she became the first ever female DJ to be named BBC Radio 1's Essential Mix of the year. She runs her own label called "Return to Disorder".

== Events ==
Helena Hauff performed at the 2018 Movement Festival in Detroit from May, 26 to 28, alongside other acts such as Diplo, Dubfire, Modeselektor, and more. Along with Movement, Hauff also performed at AVA Festival 2018 in Belfast accompanied by other performers Hunee, Midland, and many more.

Helena Hauff also performed at Dekmantel Festival 2018 hosted in Amsterdam, from 1 to 5 August. Amongst Hauff, there were other well known artists such as Four Tet, Tangerine Dream, and Thundercat.

== Discography ==
Studio albums

- Discreet Desires (2015)
- Qualm (2018)

EPs

- Actio Reactio (2013)
- Return to Disorder (2014)
- Helena Hauff Meets Andreas Gehm (2014, with Andreas Gehm)
- Shatter Cone (2014)
- Lex Tertia (2014)
- Have You Been There, Have You Seen It (2017)
- Living with Ants (2019)
- Multiply your absurdities (2024)

Singles

- "Sworn to Secrecy Part II" (2015)
- "L'Homme Mort" (2015)

Other releases

- A Tape (2015)
- Flächenbrand Mix (2015) (DJ mix)
- The Exaltics & Helena Hauff – Futuros Ep (2021)
