= L.I.E.S. =

American record label based in Brooklyn

L.I.E.S. (Long Island Electrical Systems)
- Founded: 2010
- Founder: Ron Morelli
- Distributor(s): All Day Records, Rush Hour
- Genre: House music, techno
- Country of origin: United States
- Location: Brooklyn, New York
- Official website: https://liesrecords.com/

L.I.E.S. Records is an American record label based in Brooklyn, New York that releases various types of electronic music. Founded by Ron Morelli and short for "Long Island Electrical Systems," L.I.E.S. is closely associated with the so-called outsider house genre of house and techno coming from Brooklyn. Artists include Delroy Edwards, Terekke, Gunnar Haslam, Vereker, Shawn O'Sullivan, Steve Moore, Person of Interest, Marcos Cabral, Legowelt, Randomer, and Tzusing. Founded in 2010, L.I.E.S. quickly rose to critical acclaim among music critics and fans, its 12" vinyl releases frequently quickly selling out after influential music stores like Hard Wax began to champion the label. Pitchfork Media wrote, "the rise of L.I.E.S. is one of the most significant and encouraging developments in American underground electronic music in years."
