= Lukid =

British electronic music producer

Lukid (real name Luke Blair) is an electronic music producer and UK-based composer from London, England. He has released three albums on Werkdiscs, as well as EPs on Liberation Technologies, Warp Records' sub label Arcola, and his own label Glum.

Blair is also one half of the duo Rezzett, who have released several records on London based record label The Trilogy Tapes, including a self-titled album in 2018 and the album "Meant Like This" in 2023.

In 2018 he also created a new pseudonym, Refreshers, releasing material on a record label of the same name.

In 2013, he was discussed in the Guardian with regard to the video for his song "Riquelme", which is named after footballer Juan Román Riquelme. Blair produced the video along with his brother, Sam Blair.

Since 2013 Blair has hosted a monthly show on NTS Radio.

== Education ==
Blair was educated at Highgate Wood Secondary School, a state school in North London.

== Film & Television ==
Luke Blair is a UK composer with credits that include the BFI funded feature film Personal Best, which received a nationwide cinema release, ESPN's award-winning documentary series 30 for 30, and the BBC short film Mary, by Callum Rice. He composed the original score music for Leo Leigh's films Loony in the Woods in 2006 and Sometimes Chinese in 2016.

== Fashion ==
Under his own name, and as part of Rezzett, Blair has composed music for fashion brands such as Palace, Cav Empt, Dior, Reebok, Adidas, SHOW Studio, Gareth Pugh and more.

== Dance ==
In 2023 Luke Blair composed the original music and sound design for Malik Nashad Sharpe's dance piece, Goner, which was performed at the Yard Theatre, London; Museum of Contemporary Arts, Skopje; and Dansehallern, Copenhagen.

He was also commissioned by the director Ruth Hogben to compose music for the American Ballet Theatre.

== Commercial ==
Blair has composed jingles and spots for London's NTS radio, as well as the theme for environmental podcast Sugi Talks, and architectural podcast Scaffold.

In his commercial work, Blair has collaborated with creative agencies Somesuch and Saatchi & Saatchi.

== Discography ==
- Onandon (2007)
- Foma (2009)
- Chord (2010)
- Spitting Bile (2011)
- Lonely at the Top (2012)
- This Dog Can Swim (2012)
- Crawlers (2014)
- Twisted Blood (2017)
- Drip (2019)
- Tilt (2023)
