= Tzusing =

Chinese techno artist

Tzusing 子訢
- Born: 涂子訢 Tzu Sing Tho; Kota Kinabalu, Malaysia
- Origin: Chicago, Illinois, US; Shanghai, China
- Genres: Techno; Industrial techno; EBM; World
- Occupations: Founder, H Plus Son; Director representative, Giant Bicycles board
- Years active: 2002 - Present
- Labels: L.I.E.S.; PAN; Sea Cucumber
- Publisher: Bedouin Records

Tzu Sing Tho (Chinese: 涂子訢), known professionally as Tzusing, is a Chinese techno DJ and producer. He is known for his fusion of Chinese folk music and other non-Western instrumentation with industrial techno.

== Early life ==
Tzu Sing was born in Kota Kinabalu, Malaysia to mother Bonnie Tu and father Tu Jibing. He was moved early to Singapore, then to Taichung, Taiwan.

Because of his delinquent behavior during high school, his father moved him to Shanghai, then to San Diego with his uncle. After high school, he studied at Columbia College Chicago, achieving a BA.

== Career ==
=== 2002 to 2016 ===
Tzusing began DJing in 2002 at Chicago's smartbar. However, in 2007, he was pressured to return to China and become an entrepreneur by his father; he moved to Kunshan and founded the bike parts company H Plus Son.

He returned to DJing at Shanghai's The Shelter, where he became a resident. He was picked up by L.I.E.S. for his 2014-2016 EP run A Name Out Of Place.

=== 2017 to Present ===
Tzusing's first album release was 2017's 東方不敗 (Dongfang Bubai), lit. 'Invincible East', named after the eponymous character from the wuxia novel The Smiling, Proud Wanderer. Published by L.I.E.S., music from the album was featured in an Adidas-Ivy Park campaign in 2022.

Later in 2017, he released the 5-track 一瞬千撃, transl. In A Moment A Thousand Hits, with Bedouin Records.

In 2021, Tzusing minted a record label, Sea Cucumber, based in Shanghai.

On July 8, 2021, Tzu Sing Tho was elected to the Giant Bicycles Board of Directors as Director representative of Kinablu Holdings Ltd., of which his mother Bonnie Tu was chairperson.

Tzusing's second album release was in 2023, 绿帽 Green Hat, published by PAN. The album's name and its first track Introduction's monologue are in reference to a Chinese-culture symbol of cuckoldry. The music video for its single 偶像包袱(Idol Baggage) was directed by Jesse Kanda and filmed in G-Cans.

== Discography ==
A Name Out Of Place Pt. 1

- Released: 23 December 2014
- Format: EP
- Label: L.I.E.S.
- Tracks: "1976", "Axis Of Revision", "ISMS", "No Primordial State"

A Name Out Of Place Pt. 2

- Released: 18 May 2015
- Format: EP
- Label: L.I.E.S.
- Tracks: "4 Floors Of Whores", "Frankencense And Myrrh", "Khi-Tang", "O.D.D."

A Name Out Of Place Pt. 3

- Released: 3 January 2017
- Format: EP
- Label: L.I.E.S.
- Tracks: "Face of Electric", "Emotional Eater", "R"

東方不敗 (Dongfang Bubai, transl. Invincible East)

- Released: 19 May 2017
- Label: L.I.E.S.
- Tracks: "日出東方 唯我不敗" (Rì chū dōngfāng wéi wǒ bùbài, transl. "The sun rises in the east, and I am the only one who can't defeat you"), "Digital Properties", "Esther", "King of Hosts", "Nature is Not Created", "Post Soviet Models", "Torque Pulsations"

一瞬千撃 (transl. In A Moment A Thousand Hits)

- Released: October 1, 2017
- Format: EP
- Label: Bedouin Records
- Tracks: "Flow State" feat. Illsee, "Shame", "風雲再起", "地心引力抓不住你", "得意先生"

绿帽 Green Hat

- Released: March 31, 2023
- Label: PAN, Sea Cucumber
- Director: Jesse Kanda, 偶像包袱 (Idol Baggage)
- Tracks: "Introduction", "趁人之危 (Take Advantage)", "偶像包袱 (Idol Baggage)", "Muscular Theology", "孝忍狠 (Filial Endure Ruthless)", "Balkanize", "Interlude", "Clout Tunnel" feat. Suda, "Exascale", "Gait", "戴綠帽 (Wear Green Hat)", "Residual Stress"
- Singles: "孝忍狠 (Filial Endure Ruthless)", "偶像包袱 (Idol Baggage)"

== Awards ==
Award nominations
Year	Nominated work	Category	Award	Result	Notes	Ref.
2024	绿帽 Green Hat	Best electronic album	Wave Music Awards	Nominated		
2024	Clout Tunnel	Best electronic song	Wave Music Awards	Nominated	w. Suda	
