= Hælos =

English trip hop band

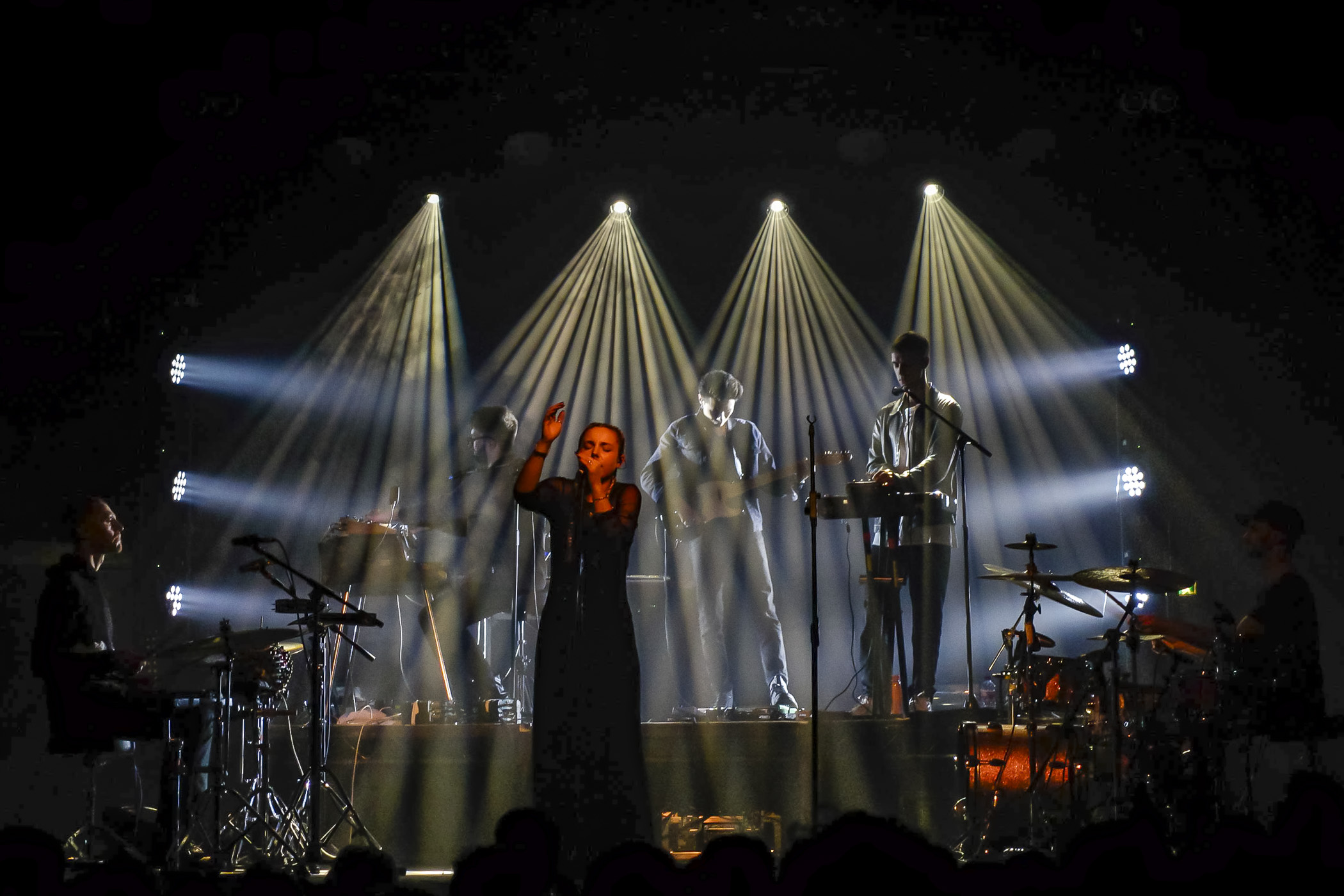
- HÆLOS performing at Heaven in London in 2016

Background information
- Origin: London, United Kingdom
- Genres: Trip hop; ambient; electronic
- Labels: Matador; Infectious
- Members: Lotti Benardout; Dom Goldsmith; Daniel Vildosola
- Past members: Arthur Delaney
- Website: haelos.com

Hælos (frequently stylized as HÆLOS, and sometimes as Haelos or HAELOS) are a British trip hop band from London.

Hælos's first single, "Dust", was released in 2014, and the group followed in 2015 with the singles "Pray" and "Earth Not Above". After signing to Matador Records in 2015, they released the Earth Not Above EP, which was followed in early 2016 with a full-length entitled Full Circle. Full Circle reached number 5 on the US Billboard electronic charts and number 20 on the Heatseekers chart. Their music has been described as "dark euphoria", and has been compared to Depeche Mode and OMD.

In January 2019, alongside the release of "Kyoto", the band announced their second album, titled Any Random Kindness, would be released on 10 May that year.

== Discography ==
=== Albums ===
- Full Circle (2016)
- Any Random Kindness (2019)
- SOMNUM (2023)

=== Extended plays ===
- Earth Not Above (2015)
- I'm There (2020)
- Somnum (2021)

=== Singles ===
- "Dust", 2014
- "Pray", 2015
- "Earth Not Above", 2015
- "Buried in the Sand", 2018
- "Kyoto", 2019
- "Boy / Girl", 2019
- "End of World Party (Edit)", 2019
- "Last Days", 2023
