= Brian Leeds =

- Born: April 20, 1991 (age 35)
- Origin: Emporia, Kansas, United States
- Genres: Outsider house, ambient
- Labels: Wicked Bass Records, Opal Tapes, Future Times, Software, Proibito, West Mineral
- Website: westmineral.ltd

Brian Leeds (born April 20, 1991), better known by the pseudonyms Pendant, Huerco S., Loidis, and Royal Crown of Sweden, is an American independent electronic musician. Born in Emporia, Kansas, United States, he is considered a pioneer in the genre of outsider house, a more experimental and lo-fi form of deep house. His recent work has abandoned outsider house in favour of an ambient sound. His music has received attention from, among others, The Fader, FACT Magazine and Tiny Mix Tapes, the latter of whom awarded his 2018 album Make Me Know You Sweet with the "Eureka!" rating of 4 out of 5.

== Discography ==
=== As Huerco S. ===
==== Albums ====
- Colonial Patterns (2013)
- For Those of You Who Have Never (And Also Those Who Have) (2016)
- Plonk (2022)

==== EPs ====
- HRCS-001 (2011)
- Untitled (2012)
- No Jack (2012)
- Apheleia's Theme (2013)
- A Verdigris Reader (2014)
- Railroad Blues (2015)

==== Limited editions ====
- Quiet Time (2016)

=== As Pendant ===
==== Albums ====
- Make Me Know You Sweet (2018)
- To All Sides They Will Stretch Out Their Hands (2021)

=== As Royal Crown of Sweden ===
==== EPs ====
- R.E.G.A.L.I.E.R. (2013)

=== As Loidis ===
==== Albums ====
- One Day (2024)
- From the Toolkit of Lovers (2026)

==== EPs ====
- A Parade, In The Place I Sit, The Floating World (& All Its Pleasures) (2018)
