= Carmen Villain =

Norwegian-Mexican musician

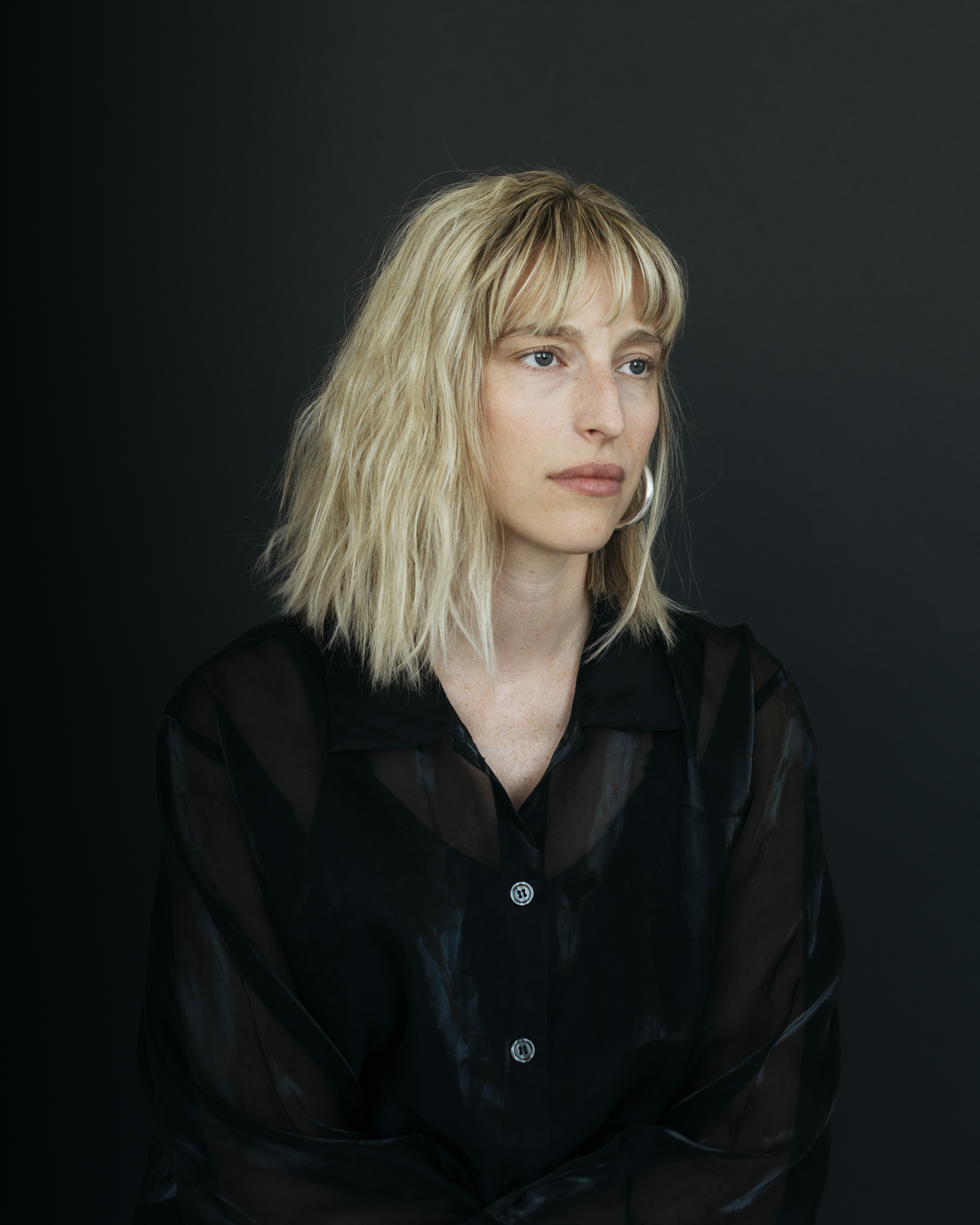
- Carmen Villain in 2018

Background information
- Born: Carmen Maria Hillestad; 1983 (age 42–43); Michigan, United States
- Origin: Oslo, Norway
- Genres: Ambient dub

Carmen Maria Hillestad (born 1983), known professionally as Carmen Villain, is a Norwegian-Mexican musical artist.

Hillestad was born in 1983 in Michigan, United States. Her mother is Mexican, and her father is Norwegian. Her parents raised her in Oslo, Norway. She grew up playing the piano and the clarinet. She worked as a model before becoming a musician.

In 2005, Hillestad moved to London and started writing music. Her early work was guitar-driven shoegaze and dream pop. Her 2022 album, Only Love From Now On, released to positive critical reception. Her album Memoria is scheduled to release on September 4, 2026.

== Discography ==
- Sleeper (2013)
- Infinite Avenue (2017)
- Both Lines Will Be Blue (2019)
- Only Love From Now On (2022)
- Memoria (2026)
