= Jon Hillcock =

British radio presenter

- Born: 25 January 1979 (age 47)
- Occupation: Radio Presenter

Jon Hillcock (born 25 January 1979) is a British radio DJ, presenter, voiceover artist and writer. He is currently a deputy presenter on BBC Radio 6 Music.

== Media career ==
=== Radio ===
Hillcock began his radio career presenting on Loughborough Campus Radio, while studying at Loughborough University in 2001. Following graduation, material from the LCR show was used to secure employment as a DJ/presenter on Virgin Megastores’ national in-store radio station, VMR.

While working at VMR full-time as assistant manager and DJ, Hillcock also began working on John Kennedy's X-Posure at London station Xfm, which eventually led to him becoming a full-time presenter. Following a stint presenting early breakfast at Xfm alongside general relief cover across the schedule - including regular cover for John Kennedy - in September 2007 Hillcock was given his own Saturday night specialist music show. New Noise shared its name with a new music podcast he had also started producing and presenting that year.

In 2009 Hillcock joined NME Radio to continue presenting both his weekly specialist new music programme New Noise, alongside a new daily programme from 10 am to 2 pm.

Since 2010 Hillcock has been used as cover on a number of programmes for the BBC. For Janice Long on BBC Radio 2, and Tom Ravenscroft, Marc Riley, Tom Robinson, Gideon Coe, Now Playing at 6 Music, Steve Lamacq, Jon Holmes, Chris Hawkins and Nemone on BBC Radio 6 Music. Jon has most recently been found standing in for Shaun W Keaveny on his regular 'sick days'.

In 2011 Hillcock was invited to present a show on Domino Radio, a short-term radio station set up by Domino Records.

Hillcock's new music podcast New Noise was renamed All Back No Front in October 2012. The relaunch coincided with the start of All Back No Front Live - a series of gigs curated and promoted by Hillcock in London.

=== Music writing ===
Since August 2011 Hillcock has written a weekly live music review column for Clash Magazine. He has also contributed to Q Magazine and NME.

=== Voice work ===
Hillcock is voiceover artist and has lent his voice to many different album and single advertising campaigns. He has been a continuity announcer for ITV3, ITV4, Virgin 1/Channel One & Sky2 and is also a regular voice on BBC America.

== Personal life ==
Hillcock has a sister, is married and has three daughters.

He is a fan of Charlton Athletic FC.
