= Glyphic (album) =

Studio album by Boxcutter
- Released: 29 October 2007
- Genre: Electronic, experimental, dubstep
- Label: Planet Mu Records
- Producer: Barry Lynn

Boxcutter chronology
Oneiric (2006)	Glyphic (2007)	Arecibo Message (2009)

Glyphic is the second studio album by the electronic artist Boxcutter. It was released in 2007 on Planet Mu Records.

== Track listing ==
1. "Glyphic" – 7:50
2. "Windfall" – 2:50
3. "Bug Octet" – 5:23
4. "Rusty Break" – 5:13
5. "J Dub" – 4:35
6. "Chiral" – 4:37
7. "Kaleid" – 5:30
8. "Bloscid" – 3:22
9. "Foxy" – 5:02
10. "Lunal" – 4:57
11. "Nanobot" – 2:16
12. "Fieldtrip" – 6:32
