= Karma & Desire =

Studio album by Actress
- Released: 23 October 2020
- Genre: Electronic
- Length: 68:28
- Label: Ninja Tune
- Producers: Actress; Aura T-09; Young Paint

Actress chronology
88 (2020)	Karma & Desire (2020)	LXXXVIII (2023)

Professional ratings
Aggregate scores
Source	Rating
Metacritic	84/100
Review scores
Source	Rating
AllMusic	4/5 stars
Beats Per Minute	76%
Clash	9/10
Exclaim!	8/10
The Quietus	4/5 stars
Under the Radar	7.5/10

Karma & Desire is the seventh solo studio album by British electronic music producer Actress, released on Ninja Tune on 23 October 2020. Its announcement was preceded by the surprise release of a single-file album by Actress named 88, which included a PDF hinting towards Karma & Desire's track listing. The album was officially announced on 1 September 2020 and described by Actress as being "a romantic tragedy set between the heavens and the underworld". The announcement of the album was accompanied by the release of the lead single from the album, "Walking Flames", featuring British singer Sampha. The album was included in Pitchfork's 41 Most Anticipated Albums of Fall 2020.

On 23 October 2020, Karma & Desire was released through Ninja Tune, along with an accompanying short film of the same name directed by Lee Bootee/ The film stars Actress, Sampha, Zsela, and Aura T-09, who all feature on the album. American musician Yves Tumor also appears. The album reached number 4 on the UK electronic album charts and was well received by critics, with Actress being acclaimed for further developing his sound.

== Critical reception ==
Phil E. Bloomfield of Bandcamp described Karma & Desire as "warmer and more generous than anything [Actress has] released to date", In a 10/10 review, Ela Minus wrote in Future Music that the album is "a masterpiece of ethereal, smudged contemporary electronic music" and "perhaps Actress' most accomplished work to date". It was named the 41st best album of 2020 by The Guardian and the 31st best album of 2020 by Clash. At the 2021 Libera Awards, Karma & Desire was nominated for Best Dance/Electronic Record, ultimately losing to Caribou's Suddenly.

== Track listing ==
Karma & Desire track listing
No.	Title	Writer(s)	Length
1.	"Fire and Light"	Darren Cunningham	1:16
2.	"Angels Pharmacy" (featuring Zsela)	Cunningham; Zsela Sterlin	4:41
3.	"Remembrance" (featuring Zsela)	Cunningham; Sterlin	2:41
4.	"Reverend"	Cunningham	2:59
5.	"Leaves Against the Sky"	Cunningham	4:38
6.	"Save"	Cunningham; Robert Ames	5:06
7.	"VVY" (featuring Sampha)	Cunningham; Sampha Sisay	2:37
8.	"XRAY"	Cunningham	3:31
9.	"Gliding Squares"	Cunningham	3:07
10.	"Many Seas, Many Rivers" (featuring Sampha)	Cunningham; Sisay	8:11
11.	"Loveless" (featuring Aura T-09)	Cunningham; Marcia Pinna	4:40
12.	"Public Life" (featuring Vanessa Benelli Mosell)	Cunningham; Ames; Young Paint	4:00
13.	"Fret"	Cunningham	1:28
14.	"Loose" (featuring Christel Well)	Cunningham; Rebekah Christel Cromwell	4:19
15.	"Turin" (featuring Aura T-09)	Cunningham; Pinna	7:13
16.	"Diamond X"	Cunningham	3:51
17.	"Walking Flames" (featuring Sampha)	Cunningham; Sisay	4:10
Total length:			68:28

== Personnel ==
- Darren Cunningham – production (tracks 1–11, 13–17), mixing (all tracks)
- Noel Summerville – engineering
- Aura T-09 – production (11, 15)
- Young Paint – production (12)
- Kara-Lis Coverdale – co-production (17)
- Unseen_Werk – creative direction, photography
- Inventory Studio – graphic design
