= Mister Saturday Night =

Recurring dance music party in New York City

- Origin: Brooklyn, New York, U.S.
- Years active: 2009–present
- Members: Eamon Harkin; Justin Carter
- Website: mistersaturdaynight.com

Mister Saturday Night is a recurring party based in Brooklyn, New York. It is organized and DJed by Eamon Harkin and Justin Carter. The duo also runs an associated Sunday afternoon party called Mister Sunday. They have been referred to as "one of the city’s most accomplished DJ duos" by The Guardian. The party started in Santos Party House, a traditional Manhattan club, in early 2009, but left the club in May of that year and began hosting its events in non-traditional venues such as 12-turn-13. Mister Saturday Night offers an alternative nightlife experience that is "just as interested in constructing an engaging journey as they are in dropping good tunes." The party gives back to the community, announcing an initiative to donate ten percent of its annual net profits in 2014 to the Robin Hood Foundation, a poverty-fighting organization in New York.

== Mister Saturday Night Records ==
Mister Saturday Night Records is the independent record label associated with Mister Saturday Night. It was founded by Justin Carter and Eamon Harkin in 2012. The label started as a home for the artists that were regulars at the party, but it has featured artists from outside of New York as well. The first eleven releases were hand-stamped, vinyl-only EPs, and it is releasing a full-length album on featuring all the artists from the label on June 23. Mister Saturday Night Records was voted Label to watch in 2014 by FACT Magazine.

=== Artists on the label ===
- Anthony Naples
- Alex Burkat
- Archie Pelago
- Dark Sky
- Hank Jackson
- Lumigraph
- Boya
- General Ludd
- Gunnar Haslam
- Keita Sano
- Nathan Melja

== Personnel ==
=== Eamon Harkin ===
Harkin was born in Northern Ireland and moved to New York in 2004. He then created ‘Calling All Kids’, a party which played homage to New York legend Arthur Russell and the history of downtown New York. He hosted a residency at FUN, at the now-gone Brooklyn club, Studio B. There he led the bookings and production and brought a variety of talent to the venue. He now produces Mister Saturday Night and Mister Sunday and DJs with his partner Carter. As a producer, Harkin has released edits, remixes and original productions, on his own and with former partner Steve Raney (as Harkin and Raney).

=== Justin Carter ===
Carter moved from North Carolina to New York in 1999. In 2004 he started DJing and producing secret parties at Asterisk, a pioneering DIY venue in Bushwick that led the way for many other living-spaces-turned-party-places and carved a new path for underground parties in Brooklyn. That year he also became a member of the Nublu family, where he launched the club’s record label and performed and DJed regularly. Carter has sung in the chorus of avant-garde composer Butch Morris and co-written and is currently working on an album of solo material.
