= Werkdiscs =

British independent record label

- Founded: 2004
- Founder: Darren J. Cunningham; Ben Casey; Gavin Weale
- Distributor(s): [PIAS] and Redeye Distribution; via Ninja Tune 2012-2015
- Genre: Electronic
- Country of origin: United Kingdom
- Official website: werkdiscs.com

Werkdiscs (formerly spelt as Werk Discs) is a British independent record label based in London. It was originally a club night started by Darren J. Cunningham also known as Actress, Ben Casey and Gavin Weale in the early 2000s. Werkdiscs released their first record in the summer of 2004.

== Artists (present and past) ==
- Actress
- Disrupt
- Atki 2
- Format.K
- Giganta
- Helena Hauff
- Lone
- Lukid
- Monkey Steak
- Moiré
- Stacs of Stamina
- Starkey
- Zomby

== See also ==
- List of record labels
