= Outsider house =

Subgenre of house

- Other names: Outsider dance; raw house
- Stylistic origins: Deep house; techno; ambient; noise; lo-fi music
- Cultural origins: Early 2010s

Subgenres
- Lo-fi house

Other topics
- IDM; minimal techno; tech house

Outsider house (originally spawned as outsider dance, also known as raw house) is a subgenre of house music, combining elements of deep house, techno, noise, and ambient, with artists embracing lo-fi techniques rather than the polished cleanliness of mainstream deep house and other EDM genres.

The term "outsider dance" was coined in 2012 by the London-based DJ Ben UFO and emphasized by music journalist Scott Wilson, referring to different producers and record labels "operating at the fringes of the fringes" such as Laurel Halo, Anthony Naples. However, Ben UFO himself called the term "off-the-cuff formulation", reacting negatively to the term taking hold and circulating, stating "I'm not exactly happy that it's now being held up as a genre, because I think this outsider thing just doesn't do justice to the artists and their music. [outsider house artists] are my friends, we get along well and support each other".

== Lo-fi house ==
Around the mid-2010s, outsider house developed into a new form, known as lo-fi house. Producers like DJ Seinfeld, DJ Boring and Ross From Friends combined rough sounds of the parent genre with the aesthetic of melancholy, irony and postmodernism attributed to vaporwave, creating songs "resembling melancholic 1990s deep house recorded to cassette and packaged with a veneer of internet-age irony". While the labels like L.I.E.S., 1080p and Lobster Theremin have carved out a signature sound, attributed to the genre, whereas music is often rough, characterized by muffled drums, fuzzy synths and a gauzy, saturated quality, but also use jazzy piano samples and warm percussion samples.
