= Burial discography =

- Studio albums: 2
- Extended plays: 16
- Compilation albums: 2
- Singles: 15
- Mix albums: 1

English electronic music producer Burial has released two studio albums, two compilation albums, one mix album, sixteen extended plays, and fourteen singles. Burial debuted in May 2005 with the release of his extended play South London Boroughs on the Hyperdub label. His eponymous debut studio album followed in May 2006 and was praised by music critics for its unique incorporation of 2-step garage, ambient, downtempo, dubstep, and trip hop styles. Following the releases of the extended plays Distant Lights (2006) and Ghost Hardware (2007), Burial released his second studio album Untrue in November 2007 to critical acclaim. It peaked at number 58 on the UK Albums Chart and at number 57 on the Ultratop 50 chart for the Belgian region of Flanders. Untrue later received nominations for the Mercury Prize and the Shortlist Music Prize, with the album experiencing a 1004% sales increase in the week following the Mercury Prize awards ceremony.

Following the release of Untrue, Burial issued several collaborative singles with other artists—"Moth" / "Wolf Cub" with producer Four Tet, "Ego" / "Mirror" with Four Tet and musician Thom Yorke, and "Four Walls" / "Paradise Circus" with trip hop group Massive Attack—and performed production work on several songs for British singer Jamie Woon's album Mirrorwriting (2011). In March 2011, Burial released the extended play Street Halo, followed by Kindred in February 2012. A compilation album combining the two extended plays, Street Halo / Kindred, was also released in February 2012. Burial has since released several succeeding EPs, including Truant / Rough Sleeper (2012), Rival Dealer (2013), Young Death / Nightmarket (2016), Subtemple / Beachfires (2017), and Antidawn (2022); most of which were included in the compilation album Tunes 2011–2019 (2019).

== Albums ==
=== Studio albums ===
List of studio albums, with selected chart positions and certifications
Title	Details	Peak chart positions				Certifications
Title	Details	UK	UK Dance	BEL (FL)	BEL (FL) Alt.	Certifications
Burial	Released: 15 May 2006; Label: Hyperdub (HDBCD001); Formats: CD, LP, digital download	—	—	—	—	
Untrue	Released: 5 November 2007; Label: Hyperdub (HDBCD002); Formats: CD, LP, digital download	58	4	57	23	BPI: Silver
"—" denotes a recording that did not chart or was not released in that territory.

=== Compilation albums ===
List of compilation albums, with selected chart positions
Title	Details	Peak chart positions		
Title	Details	UK Dance	BEL (FL)	JPN
Street Halo / Kindred	Released: 11 February 2012; Label: Beat (BRC320); Formats: CD, digital download	—	186	185
Tunes 2011–2019	Released: 6 December 2019; Label: Hyperdub (HDBCD048); Formats: CD, digital download	5	190	—
"—" denotes a recording that did not chart or was not released in that territory.

=== Mix albums ===
List of mix albums, with selected chart positions
Title	Details	Peak chart positions
Title	Details	UK Dance
Fabriclive 100 (with Kode9)	Released: 28 September 2018; Label: Fabric (FABRIC200); Formats: CD, LP, digital download	5

== Extended plays ==
List of extended plays, with selected chart positions
Title	Details	Peak chart positions			
Title	Details	BEL (FL)	JPN	US Heat.	US Dance
South London Boroughs	Released: 16 May 2005; Label: Hyperdub (HDB001); Formats: 12", digital download	—	—	—	—
Distant Lights	Released: 28 August 2006; Label: Hyperdub (HDB003); Formats: 12", digital download	—	—	—	—
Ghost Hardware	Released: 18 June 2007; Label: Hyperdub (HDB004); Formats: 12", digital download	—	—	—	—
Street Halo	Released: 28 March 2011; Label: Hyperdub (HDB013); Formats: 12", digital download	—	—	—	—
Kindred	Released: 13 February 2012; Label: Hyperdub (HDB059); Formats: 12", digital download	—	—	—	—
Truant / Rough Sleeper	Released: 17 December 2012; Label: Hyperdub (HDB069); Formats: 12", CD, digital download	—	—	—	—
Rival Dealer	Released: 9 December 2013; Label: Hyperdub (HDB080); Formats: 12", CD, digital download	—	140	5	8
Young Death / Nightmarket	Released: 28 November 2016; Label: Hyperdub (HDB100); Formats: 12", digital download	—	—	—	—
Subtemple / Beachfires	Released: 19 May 2017; Label: Hyperdub (HDB108); Formats: 10", digital download	—	—	—	—
Fog / Shrine (with The Bug as Flame 1)	Released: 30 March 2018; Label: Pressure (PRESH001); Formats: 12", digital download	—	—	—	—
Claustro / State Forest	Released: 14 June 2019; Label: Hyperdub (HDB120); Formats: 12", digital download	—	—	—	—
Dive / Rain (with The Bug as Flame 2)	Released: 5 August 2019; Label: Pressure (PRESH008); Formats: 12", digital download	—	—	—	—
Shock Power of Love (with Blackdown)	Released: 29 April 2021; Label: Keysound (LDN083); Formats: 12", digital download	—	—	—	—
Chemz / Dolphinz	Released: 21 May 2021; Label: Hyperdub (HDB134); Formats: 12", digital download	—	—	—	—
Antidawn	Released: 28 January 2022; Label: Hyperdub (HDBCD050); Formats: 12", CD, digital download	44	—	—	—
Streetlands	Released: 21 October 2022; Label: Hyperdub (HDB150); Formats: 12", digital download	—	—	—	—
Comafields / Imaginary Festival	Released: 1 August 2025; Label: Hyperdub (HDB161); Formats: 12", digital download	—	—	—	—
"—" denotes a recording that did not chart or was not released in that territory.

== Singles ==
List of singles, with selected chart positions, showing year released and album name
Title	Details	Peak chart positions	Album
Title	Details	BEL (FL) Tip	Album
"Archangel"	Released: 2007; Label: Hyperdub; Formats: CD-R	21	Untrue
"Ghost Hardware"	Released: 10 December 2007; Label: Hyperdub; Formats: Digital download	—	Untrue
"Moth" / "Wolf Cub" (with Four Tet)	Released: 4 May 2009; Label: Text (TEXT006); Formats: 12"	—	Non-album singles
"Ego" / "Mirror" (with Four Tet and Thom Yorke)	Released: 21 March 2011; Label: Text (TEXT010); Formats: 12"	—	Non-album singles
"Four Walls" / "Paradise Circus" (with Massive Attack)	Released: 24 October 2011; Label: The Vinyl Factory (VF034), Inhale Gold (INHALEGOLD001); Formats: 12"	—	Non-album singles
"Nova" (with Four Tet)	Released: 19 March 2012; Label: Text (TEXT013); Formats: 12"	—	Non-album singles
"Temple Sleeper"	Released: 22 January 2015; Label: Keysound (LDN051); Formats: 12", digital download	—	Non-album singles
"Sweetz" (with Zomby)	Released: 29 July 2016; Label: Hyperdub (HDB103); Formats: 10"	—	Ultra
"Rodent"	Released: 14 September 2017; Label: Hyperdub (HDB113); Formats: 10", digital download	—	Non-album singles
"Pre Dawn" / "Indoors"	Released: 17 November 2017; Label: Nonplus (NONPLUS043); Formats: 12", digital download	—	Non-album singles
"Her Revolution" / "His Rope" (with Four Tet and Thom Yorke)	Released: 2 December 2020; Label: XL Recordings (XL1106T); Formats: 12"	—	Non-album singles
"Chemz"	Released: 21 December 2020; Label: Hyperdub; Formats: Digital download	—	Chemz / Dolphinz
"Unknown Summer" (Note: Split with Kode9's single "Infirmary".)	Released: 21 July 2023; Label: Fabric (FRO010); Formats: 12", digital download	—	Non-album singles
"Dreamfear" / "Boy Sent From Above"	Released: 2 February 2024; Label: XL Recordings (XL1401); Formats: 12", digital download	—	Non-album singles
"Phoneglow" (Note: Split with Kode9's single "Eyes Go Blank".)	Released: 18 June 2024; Label: Hyperdub (HDB155); Formats: 12", digital download	—	Non-album singles
"—" denotes a recording that did not chart or was not released in that territory.

== Other appearances ==
=== Guest appearances ===
List of guest appearances, showing year released and album name
Title	Year	Other artist(s)	Album
"Versus"	2006	none	Warrior Dubz
"Unite"	2007	none	Box of Dub: Dubstep and Future Dub
"Fostercare"	2009	none	5: Five Years of Hyperdub
"Vial"	2010	Breakage	Foundation
"Prophecy"	2010	El-B	Nu Levels
"Lambeth"	2014	none	Hyperdub 10.4
"Old Tape"	2019	none	HyperSwim
"Starlore"	2019	none	Konsolation

=== Remix work ===
List of remix work for other artists, showing year released and album name
Title	Year	Other artist(s)	Album
"Crackle Blues" (Burial Remix)	2006	Blackdown	"Lata" single
"Wayfaring Stranger" (Burial Remix)	2007	Jamie Woon	"Wayfaring Stranger" single
"Where Is Home?" (Burial Remix)	2007	Bloc Party	"Flux" single
"And It Rained All Night" (Burial Remix)	2007	Thom Yorke	The Eraser Rmxs
"Be True" (Burial Remix)	2008	Commix	Re:Call to Mind
"Inner City Life" (Burial Remix) (featuring Espa)	2017	Goldie	"Inner City Life (2017 Rebuild and Burial Remix)" single
"Deep Summer" (Burial Remix)	2017	Mønic	"Deep Summer" single
"Love" (Burial Remix)	2019	Luke Slater	Love Remixes
"The Spell" (Burial Mix) (featuring Ingrid Chavez)	2020	Charles Webster	"The Spell" single
"Only the Good Times" (Burial Remix)	2024	L.B. Dub Corp	"Only the Good Times" single

=== Production work ===
List of production work for other artists, showing year released and album name
Title	Year	Artist(s)	Co-producer(s)	Album
"Night Air"	2010	Jamie Woon	Jamie Woon	Mirrorwriting
"Street"	2011	Jamie Woon	Jamie Woon	Mirrorwriting
"Lady Luck"	2011	Jamie Woon	Jamie Woon, Royce Wood Jr.	Mirrorwriting
"The Second Spell" (featuring Ingrid Chavez)	2020	Charles Webster	Charles Webster	Decision Time

=== Radio mix appearances ===
List of radio mix appearances, showing year broadcast and selected information
Title	Year	Notes
"Gaslight"	2006	Broadcast: 4 April 2006 on Radio 1's Experimental Show
"Rain"	2006	Broadcast: 4 April 2006 on Radio 1's Experimental Show
"U Hurt Me (Version)"	2006	Broadcast: 17 April 2006 on Keysound Radio
"Stairwell"	2007	Broadcast: 25 May 2007 on Radio 1's Experimental Show
"Feral Witchchild"	2007	Broadcast: 17 October 2007 on Radio 1's Experimental Show
"Archeron"	2007	Broadcast: 17 October 2007 on Radio 1's Experimental Show
"Afterglow"	2007	Broadcast: 17 October 2007 on Radio 1's Experimental Show
"Sinkheart"	2007	Broadcast: 17 October 2007 on Radio 1's Experimental Show
"Speedball 2"	2007	Broadcast: 17 October 2007 on Radio 1's Experimental Show
"Cold Planet"	2007	Broadcast: 17 October 2007 on Radio 1's Experimental Show
"Stay"	2007	Broadcast: 17 October 2007 on Radio 1's Experimental Show
"True Love VIP"	2008	Broadcast: 15 February 2008 on Rinse FM
Untitled	2009	Broadcast: 20 February 2009 on Deviation
"Deity" (with Goldie)	2010	Broadcast: 10 March 2010 on Metalheadz Podcast
"Pole Position" (Note: Instra:mental's Kid Drama revealed the track's title on CNVX Radio in 2021.) (with dBridge and Instra:mental)	2011	Broadcast: 7 December 2011 on Rinse FM; Broadcast: 10 February 2021 on CNVX Radio
Untitled (with Four Tet)	2013	Broadcast: 7 October 2013 on Rinse FM
Dark Untitled (with Instra:mental)	2020	Broadcast: 1 February 2020 on Radio 1's Essential Mix

=== Film Soundtrack ===
List of films containing Burial compositions
Year	Title	Director
2024	Bird	Andrea Arnold
2024	Baby Invasion	Harmony Korine
