= Tunes 2011–2019 =

Compilation album by Burial
- Released: 6 December 2019
- Recorded: 2011–2019
- Studio: Transition, London (mastering)
- Length: 149:39
- Label: Hyperdub
- Producer: Burial

Burial chronology
Claustro / State Forest (2019)	Tunes 2011–2019 (2019)	Shock Power of Love EP (2021)

Tunes 2011–2019 is the second compilation album by British electronic musician Burial. It was released by Hyperdub on 6 December 2019, and compiles Burial's solo EPs on the label.

== Reception ==
Professional ratings
Aggregate scores
Source	Rating
Metacritic	96/100
Review scores
Source	Rating
AllMusic	4.5/5 stars
Exclaim!	8/10
The Guardian	5/5 stars
The Irish Times	5/5 stars
Mondo Sonoro	9/10
The Observer	5/5 stars
Pitchfork	9.0/10
PopMatters	10/10
Sputnikmusic	4.8/5
Uncut	9/10

The compilation received universal critical acclaim, garnering a Metacritic score of 96 based on 10 reviews.

The album's non-chronological track sequencing has been singled out by many publications for praise. Writing for Popmatters, Rod Waterman notes that it forces the listener "to think about" the music "across a significant period, rather than to react just to the release of a couple of songs at a time and to revel in the arrival of new Burial music. The juxtaposition of these tracks, and in the order Bevan has chosen here, suggests relationships and trajectories that might not have previously been apparent. It suggests further that Burial has been playing a very long game, with an artistic and emotional vision that is even more comprehensive than we might have imagined." Sam Richards of Uncut similarly notes that "the compilation is sequenced for flow", thus resulting in the emergence of "some unexpected shapes." A staff reviewer for Sputnikmusic characterized the album as an "epilogue", writing that it "instills a level of newfound confidence, of acceptance. Bevan, now Burial again, feels at home with no plot to course."

Others have praised the content of the compilation itself, with Pitchfork's Gabriel Szatan considering the first half of the second disc to be "the apex of Burial's dancefloor material, truly as good as it gets." In a perfect score review, Damien Morris of The Observer hailed the album as a "compilation of rare bravery and beauty", and compared Burial to Banksy for his ability to communicate "poetic truths about the prosaic to the public." Eamon Sweeney of The Irish Times made a similar comparison, and wrote that the collection "constitutes arguably the finest compilation of the last 10 years."

== Track listing ==
All tracks are written by Burial.

Disc one
No.	Title	Origin	Length
1.	"State Forest"	Claustro / State Forest (2019)	8:03
2.	"Beachfires"	Subtemple / Beachfires (2017)	9:53
3.	"Subtemple"	Subtemple / Beachfires (2017)	7:25
4.	"Young Death"	Young Death / Nightmarket (2016)	5:51
5.	"Nightmarket"	Young Death / Nightmarket (2016)	7:28
6.	"Hiders"	Rival Dealer (2013)	4:45
7.	"Come Down to Us"	Rival Dealer (2013)	13:06
8.	"Claustro"	Claustro / State Forest (2019)	5:44
9.	"Rival Dealer"	Rival Dealer (2013)	10:43
Total length:			72:48

Disc two
No.	Title	Origin	Length
1.	"Kindred"	Kindred (2012)	11:29
2.	"Loner"	Kindred (2012)	7:31
3.	"Ashtray Wasp"	Kindred (2012)	11:47
4.	"Rough Sleeper"	Truant / Rough Sleeper (2012)	13:49
5.	"Truant"	Truant / Rough Sleeper (2012)	11:48
6.	"Street Halo"	Street Halo (2011)	6:46
7.	"Stolen Dog"	Street Halo (2011)	6:23
8.	"NYC"	Street Halo (2011)	7:39
Total length:			76:51

Notes

- The album's original CD release erroneously lists "Claustro" and "Rival Dealer" in swapped order.
- The digital release of Tunes 2011–2019 has a slightly edited version of "Beachfires" with a duration of 9:10.

== Charts ==
Chart (2019–2020)	Peak position
Belgian Albums (Ultratop Flanders)	190
UK Dance Albums (OCC)	5
