= 5: Five Years of Hyperdub =

Compilation album by various artists
- Released: 5 October 2009
- Genre: Dubstep
- Length: 2:29:10
- Label: Hyperdub

Professional ratings
Review scores
Source	Rating
AllMusic	5/5 stars
Fact	8.5/10
The Observer	4/5 stars
Pitchfork	8.2/10
Record Collector	4/5 stars
Resident Advisor	4.5/5
Rolling Stone	3.5/5 stars
XLR8R	9/10

5: Five Years of Hyperdub is a compilation album of material from the back catalogue of the record label Hyperdub. The first disc consists of unreleased material, and the second disc consists of previously released tracks.

Pitchfork listed 5: Five Years of Hyperdub as the 27th best album of 2009.

== Track listing ==
Disc one
No.	Title	Artist(s)	Length
1.	"Meltdown"	King Midas Sound	4:27
2.	"Time Patrol" (featuring Cha Cha)	Kode9 and The Spaceape	5:09
3.	"Aidys Girl's a Computer"	Darkstar	5:13
4.	"Roller Skates"	Samiyam	2:18
5.	"Disco Balls"	Flying Lotus	2:33
6.	"Purple Smoke"	Black Chow	3:25
7.	"Fostercare"	Burial	5:32
8.	"Weekend Fly"	Cooly G	4:19
9.	"Tarantula"	Zomby	4:05
10.	"Mega Drive Generation"	Martyn	6:17
11.	"Turn Away" (featuring Dandelion)	LV	4:14
12.	"Level Nine"	Mala	4:53
13.	"Shake It"	LD	6:10
14.	"Bleeps from Outer Space"	Quarta330	5:21
15.	"Sahara Michael"	Ikonika	4:22
16.	"Stash"	Joker and Ginz	4:36

Disc two
No.	Title	Artist(s)	Length
1.	"9 Samurai"	Kode9	5:39
2.	"South London Boroughs"	Burial	5:06
3.	"Bad"	Kode9 and LD	5:12
4.	"Money Honey" (Remix; featuring Warrior Queen)	The Bug	4:56
5.	"Globetrotting (Erol Bellot)"	LV	3:44
6.	"Distant Lights"	Burial	5:26
7.	"Ghost Town"	Kode9 and The Spaceape	4:20
8.	"Fukkaz"	Kode9 and The Spaceape	4:58
9.	"Return"	Samiyam	3:09
10.	"Need You"	Darkstar	6:10
11.	"Spliff Dub (Rustie Remix)"	Zomby	3:32
12.	"Please"	Ikonika	4:40
13.	"Kaliko"	Zomby	3:57
14.	"You Don't Know What Love Is"	2000F and J Kamata	5:46
15.	"Digidesign"	Joker	4:12
16.	"9 Samurai" (Quarta330 Remix)	Kode9	5:29

== Charts ==
Chart (2009)	Peak position
UK Compilation Albums (OCC)	66
