= Playin' Me =

Studio album by Cooly G
- Released: 10 July 2012
- Genre: Various: UK Funky; bass; soul; drum and bass; lovers rock; dubstep; UK garage; R&B; post-disco; deep house; sophisti-pop; singer-songwriter; minimal; techno; grime; broken beat; 2-step garage
- Length: 52:08
- Label: Hyperdub
- Producer: Cooly G

Cooly G chronology
Playin' Me (2012)	Wait 'Til NIght (2014)

Singles from Playin' Me
- 1. ""Up in My Head" / "Phat Si"" Released: 6 August 2010; 2. "Landscapes" / "It's Serious" Released: 3 November 2011

Playin' Me is the debut studio album of British UK funky musician Merissa Campbell, known by her stage name as Cooly G. It wasn't until more than a year before the release of Playin' Me that Campbell began work on a full-length debut album as suggested by Hyperdub founder Kode9. Previously-released cuts including "Up in My Head," "Landscapes," and "It's Serious" appeared on the album's final track listing.

Playin' Me was produced with the programs Ableton Live, FL studio, and Logic Pro. While mostly written and produced by Campbell herself, the album also features collaborations with Arethis (Aaron Carr), producers P. L. Stanislas-Renouf, known by his stage name as Simbad, and Karizma. It maintains the same sparse structure and UK funky styles of Cooly G's previous records. In using minimal arrangements, the LP is focused on tension and testing the listener's patience through the use of certain sounds coming in and out of the mix at random. A Pitchfork critic categorized it as "music that knocks you over with a feather" where so much goes on despite its quiet, scarce, and understated structure.

Playin' Me is a much more lyric-focused record than Campbell's previous DJ-set-suitable releases. The album is based on her feelings from a worsening relationship she was in since 2005 when her first son was born. It goes through different moods and the messages are often uninterpretable and contradict with the vibe of the music, indicating the main female character in the LP's relationship story feels disorientate. Playin' Me was also noted by some journalists to be about the culture and lifestyle of London.

Released in July 2012 by Hyperdub, Playin' Me garnered critical acclaim; numerous reviewers praised Cooly G for being able to create a great and unique full-length record, a goal not many dance and dubstep producers were able to achieve. Common highlights in reviews were its lyrics and how the LP mixed together multiple genres. However, some writers also criticized the inclusion of Cooly G's cover of "Trouble," a song by English rock band Coldplay. Playin' Me was in the top 50 of numerous year-end lists by publications such as The Guardian, Gigwise, and The Wire. Time Out London and Fact put it in the top ten on their lists, Fact later ranking it at number 100 on their list of the best LPs of the first half of the 2010s.

== History ==
"Most of the tracks on Playin’ Me are straight up freestyled products of my emotions that were put together at the moment I was feeling them. They came directly from the emotional source, time, and place. But they were almost entirely improvised. I would just sit down and BAM—sing, BAM—harmonies, BAM—plug-ins, all out at one time. Tune done. In under an hour. I’m quick. Occasionally I would have to go back and EQ my hi-hats a little bit, but that's about all. "

— Merissa Campbell in an interview with Electronic Beats

Merissa Campbell spent the first 15 years of her career releasing only singles and EPs. "Up in My Head" / "Phat Si" was issued by Hyperdub on 6 August 2010. Hyperdub then issued the single "Landscapes" / "It's Serious," on 3 November 2011. Music journalists gave the single favorable reviews upon its release, though they felt that the music took multiple plays for the listener to get into it. "Landscapes" also received an official music video that was summarized by XLR8R as "psychedlic video feedback of the producer's singing visage [that] fills the screen with pinks, purples, and other warm hues." It was until Hyperdub founder Kode9 gave Campbell the idea to produce and release an album that she started making an LP during her free time from touring.

Taking more than a year to finish, Playin' Me was produced with the programs Ableton Live and Logic Pro as well as controllers such as Ableton's Launchpad and the Korg Kaoss Pad. Most of the tracks are recordings of freestyle performances and were completed in under an hour. Her son made vocal engineering contributions to some of the LP's final tracks. Out of 20 tracks she produced for the album, ten made it to the final track list although "He said I said", "Come into My Room", and "Good Times" were Produced entirely by Arethis (Aaron Carr) despite having featuring credits that were acknowledged later on digital copies of the Album. The tracks "Sunshine" and the Coldplay cover "Trouble" feature production by the artist Arethis as well. "Up in My Head," "Landscapes," and "It's Serious" are also on Playin' Me. The album first became available via streaming on 10 July 2012. It then premiered on Hype Machine on 16 July 2012 before Hyperdub released it in digital stores and on physical format on 17 July 2012.

== Lyrical themes ==
One difference of Playin' Me from past Cooly G records, which consisted of sounds and structures more suited for live DJ sets, is that it is much more lyric-focused. Campbell explained that Playin' Me primarily has themes about a worsening relationship, which were based on Campbell's own experiences of being in one from as early of 2005 when her first son, Nas, was born. However, some critics also noted Playin' Me to be about the culture and lifestyle of London, a portion of the album's songs having stories about riding a bus home late at night, finding partners in a club, and going "down the street" with friends.

As Campbell explained, "I was just going through all these emotions and thinking about loads of things and while I was going through that I was doing the album. [On] the track, "Trying," I was angry one night and I was crying and that tune came out. So it was that kind of vibe." In addition to garnering serious emotions from her relationship, she also became very tempestuous from watching the news. An example of this is "What This World Needs Now," a song based on Campbell's feelings towards the 2010 Haiti earthquake; the title of the song was conceived by his husband. Nate Patrin of Pitchfork labeled the album's lyrics as "evocative without shutting out the possibility of some elusive subtext."

The relationship on Playin' Me starts with "He Said I Said," where an unnamed male tells the main character of the story, Cooly G, to relax at his home. By "What This World Needs Now," the male takes control of her. Mike Newmark of PopMatters described the song as a "confusing track—seductively, maddeningly so—made no clearer by the title implying that love, sweet love, will make everything all right." He analyzed the track's "chords that throb atop the slick double-time beat imply not love, but sex—erotic, confounding, destabilizing sex." By the piano-driven "Come into My Room," Cooly G becomes too weak to not accept her partner's sexual advances.

Playin' Me mostly shows its main character feeling disorientate, the clearest indication of this coming from when she sings on "Trouble," "Oh no, I see / A spider web, it's tangled up with me / And I lost my head / The thought of all the stupid things I said." To represent this, the record goes through several different moods, and most of the messages of the song's lyrics are uninterpretable and often contradict with the mood of the instrumental. On "Sunshine," Campbell sings the refrain "You bring me sunshine," but the music "evoke[s] a cloudy, restless ambivalence," wrote Newmark. As Newmark described "Trying," it "emphasizes two words that speak of struggle—"trying" and "crying"—yet the music undulates with cathartic bliss that brings to mind the elysian soundscapes of the gone-too-soon trip-hop group Povi."

== Music ==
Playin' Me maintains the same minimal arrangement of synthesizer sounds and UK funky styles that defined previous Cooly G's previous releases. The vocals and sparse style of the LP was compared by critic Will Ryan to the self-titled debut albums of Emika and Nina Kraviz. Patrin described the LP as mainly including a "juxtaposition of complex drum patterns, slow-motion melodies, and heavily floating basslines" and wrote that it touches on several genres to the point where "its personality's better defined by its moods than any genre affiliations." Journalist Martin Clark categorized Playin' Me as a "broken dub house" record due to its use of "delayed percussive touches, subby basslines and wistful Detroit pads."

Patrin labeled the content of Playin' Me as "music that knocks you over with a feather" where so much goes on despite its quiet, scarce, and understated structure. The album is very focused on tension and testing the patience of the listener; synthesizer sounds play at random moments, and, as Clark described, various types of drum rhythms are used, ranging from "driving to scattered and beatless." The most disordered and harshest song on the album is "Is It Gone?". Ari Spool of Tiny Mix Tapes wrote that it contains "broken-up, repetitious vocals and watch-alarm tweets, [...] and you can envision Cooly pressing MPC pads and feeling out the rhythm organically." While some reviewers described Playin' Me as a vocal record, Newmark disagreed with this categorization and analyzed the LP is about how the musical content "interacts" with the lyrics Campbell sings and "provides us with necessary information." His example for this was the title track, which involves her singing only the words "Playin’ Me" throughout, but the mood of the instrumental changes from "disbelief to anger" in the middle of the song's runtime.

Categorizing the style of Playin' Me as a mixture of mainstream club music and experimental dark pop, musicOMH critic Martyn Young wrote that it has a "slightly strange ghostly vibe" and a "sense of mystery and portent," with "the songs floating along on a distended ethereal plane." As Ryan analyzed, "the record is never straight-up ambient, but some of its most compelling material, on tracks like "Come into My Room" or "Good Times," is a loose assemblage of beats, synths, and organic instrumentation bleeding together like runny watercolors." Patrin highlighted the LP's "sly dynamic" in the way each track is mixed: "if you want to really get a good sense of how she lets the snares play against each other, you need to push the volume up into the red. At that point, the bass will flood even more of your ear-space, while still sounding more warm than abrasive-- it doesn't rattle subwoofers, it melts them."

== Vocals ==
Being that Playin' Me is a LP focused on lyrics, Campbell's singing is more prevalent than her past records. Most of the album's tracks involve her vocals at the highest volume in the mix, and its very few other songs, including "Trouble," involve other sounds interrupting her singing. A. J. Samuels of Electronic Beats described her vocal performance on the album as "a more experimental Sade," while Patrin labeled the vocal melodies "melodic but not really melismatic." On the record, her lead vocals are performed and edited in a variety of manners; while the words she sings are clear on some tracks, other songs involve an audio recording of her saying only one word or breathing filtered in echo and being "twist[ed] around bed sheets and pillowcases," as Clark described. Patrin wrote that in some songs, such as "Trying," "It's Serious," and the title track, "her voice is scarce enough to pass for the skeletal remnants of stripped-away vocals in vintage dub versions, allusive flashes of context overwhelmed by the sound system." However, other songs involve Campbell singing in a way that's "unashamedly sensual, but in a way that feels more like a deep internal monologue than a performance for an audience," analyzed Patrin.

== Critical reception ==
Professional ratings
Aggregate scores
Source	Rating
AnyDecentMusic?	7.5/10
Review scores
Source	Rating
AllMusic	4/5 stars
The Guardian	4/5 stars
NME	8/10
Pitchfork	8/10
PopMatters	9/10 stars
Q	4/5 stars
The Skinny	3/5 stars
Spin	7/10
Tiny Mix Tapes	4/5 discs
Uncut	3/5 stars

In a 2014 retrospective piece published in Fact magazine, a critic wrote that in 2012, Playin' Me was a "sheer surprise" given the "string of whipcrack UK funky releases" at the time. Alexis Petridis called the album "unearthly, alternately scattered and luscious, and ultimately like no one else." In a review for The Skinny, Bram E. Gieben described it as a "strong, dynamic listen from a young producer with heaps of artistic courage and ability." Samuels favorably compared Playin' Me to English musician Goldie's album Timeless (1995); he praised the "explorativeness" of Playin' Me, reasoning that "there are easier ways to get heads bobbing and asses shaking, and Cooly G resists them all, opting for a subtler tweaking of heroes and genres." Clark called the LP a near "perfect execution of [Cooly G's] sound," his only minor criticisms being her cover of "Trouble" and that the "odd vocal embellishment sounds ill-advised."

Chris Power of BBC Music praised how the album mixes together multiple styles and how Cooly G "evoke[s] a season, or the sorrowful arc of an entire relationship, with skill and power." Irish music critic Jim Carroll also highlighted how the LP combines several different genres together: "The beauty of Playin’ Me is not so much that [Campbell] expertly blends everything from dubby house to r’n’b as she weaves these tales, but how she uses this to illuminate the many striking songs here." Journalist Martyn Young stated, "Playin’ Me combines all of Cooly G's influences, relentless ambition and invention into an album that represents all that is exciting about UK bass music in 2012." Spool opined that, "as a decisive statement of a not-so-newcomer's extension of style, Playin’ Me is a worthwhile listen and a flag-in-the-sand moment for the club scene in London." However, he felt that some of the songs were more suited being a part of a DJ mix.

Writing an article for The Quietus, Angus Finlayson opined that most of Playin' Me showed Campbell successfully achieving the goal of making a unique full-length album, which was rare for a dance or dubstep producer to do: "[she] has more than risen to the challenge, developing her own distinctive grammar that tips generous nods to the dancefloor whilse acknowledging that, in this new territory, fresh creative trajectories ought to be pursued." Ryan similarly wrote, "Given more than two sides of a 12″, as has been her MO thus far, she's able to sketch and carve out her own sonic world, affectively leaving her [dubstep] scene qualifications at the door to build something with a little lasting significance." Time Out London stated that Cooly G "succeeds with this debut album where most dance LPs fail – by avoiding endless bangers and instead using her studio skills and tender vocals to craft real songs with real bite."

Newmark honored the album for being a record that has viewpoints from a female regarding popular topics of relationship problems, which was very unusual for a record in the dubstep scene, mostly consisting of male producers, to have. He called it "incredibly honest, refreshingly free of competitive posturing, and full of new-era dubstep richness." Finlayson called the lyrical content of Playin' Me "distinct," "showing how both the depth and the surface of romantic endeavour can be expressed without recourse to some placeless, faceless world of cliché and empty platitudes." Similarly, The 405 critic Alex Cull praised how the songs executed its negative lyrical themes: "What Playin' Me never does however is descend into stilted histrionics, no matter how emotional – or even traumatic – the events it chronicles are, and it's hard not to feel a little inspired by this."

On the other hand, a Dusted magazine reviewer stated that while the lyrics aren't "great," what makes the songs work is how "the spontaneity and soulfulness of [Campbell's] vocals resonate because it's grounded in how she feels rather than how she thinks we'll take it." He reasoned that "it's ultimately her skill at painting from experience, conveying "vibes from the heart" without concern for generic conventions, that makes Playin' Me unique and gives it a human appeal beyond its prescribed [dubstep] scene."

However, Finlayson also described Playin' Me's dancefloor-suited songs as "pale and slightly lacklustre: whether it's a matter of technical production chops or less tangible creative choices, they often lack punch and dynamic, a fact which is no doubt a turn-off for DJs in clubs as much as it is for yours truly at home." He overall stated that the LP was good but not excellent, his reasons being that Cooly G had an "unwillingness to stretch beyond a single idea" and her singing was "by no means unpleasant or ineffective, but each time I listen to this record I find less to love in her pronouncements, find it harder to sink into the timeless ritual of following the grain, the expressive minutiae, the ineffable richness that animates the vocal chords of a great singer."

In an eight-out-of-ten review, George Bass of Drowned in Sound stated that with Playin' Me, "Cooly G has achieved a small miracle in making an album that never fudges the consistency of early singles." However, he also criticized it for not being "as technical as other Hyperdub releases, or not as technical as it is concerned with keeping the crowd on their toes." Ben Ratliff of The New York Times had a mixed opinion towards the album; he wrote that "it's got moments" but wasn't very favorable towards its "weird kind of singer-songwriter" method, reasoning that "the narratives are fractured or boiled down to nearly nothing." Some reviewers were specifically critical towards Cooly G's cover of "Trouble." A writer for NME felt it disrupted the flow of the LP, a Spin magazine critic called it "needless," while Clark found it to be "terrible not because of its source but of the disconnect between the unrelated keys the vocal and the piano parts are playing in."

== Accolades ==
Year-end
Publication	Rank
Fact	3
Gigwise	29
The Guardian	15
musicOMH	39
Self-titled ("75 Records Worth Buying Beyond Our Top 10 Lists")	*
Time Out London	8
The Wire	41
2010–14
Publication	Rank
Fact	100
All-time
Publication	Rank
The Fader ("150 More Great Albums Made By Women")	25
"*" indicates an unordered list.

== Track listing and personnel ==
All songs written and produced by Merissa Campbell.

Playin' Me – Standard version
No.	Title	Additional writer(s)	Length
1.	"He Said I Said (additional production by Arethis/ Aaron Carr)"		3:03
2.	"What This World Needs Now"		3:44
3.	"Come into My Room (produced by Arethis/Aaron Carr)"		2:50
4.	"Landscapes" (featuring Simbad)	P. L. Stanislas-Renouf	4:43
5.	"Good Times (additional production by Arethis/Aaron Carr)"		2:49
6.	"Sunshine (additional production by Arethis/Aaron Carr)"		4:49
7.	"Trying"		3:06
8.	"Playin' Me"		4:45
9.	"Trouble"	Chris Martin; Guy Berryman; Jonny Buckland; Will Champion	4:43
10.	"What Airtime"		5:35
11.	"It's Serious" (featuring Karizma)	Kris Klayton	3:49
12.	"Is It Gone"		4:38
13.	"Up in My Head"		3:34
Total length:			52:08
