= Work It Out =

Work It Out may refer to:

- "Work It Out", a song by TJ Davis for Sonic R
- Work It Out (album), an album by Caroline's Spine
- "Work It Out" (Beyoncé song)
- "Work It Out" (Def Leppard song)
- "Work It Out" (Joe Jonas song)
- "Work It Out" (Jurassic 5 song)
- "Work It Out" (Karizma song)
- "Work It Out" (Steve "Silk" Hurley song)
- "Doctor (Work It Out)", a song by Pharrell Williams featuring Miley Cyrus, 2024
- "Work It Out!", a song by Kumi Koda from Best: Third Universe/Universe
- "Work It Out", a song by Misia from Just Ballade
- "Work It Out", a song by Q-Tip from The Renaissance
- "Work It Out", a song by Monie Love from the Boyz n the Hood soundtrack
- "Work It Out", a song by Shiva
- "Work It Out", a song by A-Trak

== See also ==
- Work It out with Chet Atkins C.G.P., an album by Chet Atkins
- Working It Out, a 1990 American television sitcom
- "Work It Out", a storyline in the science fiction comedy webtoon series Live with Yourself!
- We Can Work It Out (disambiguation)
