= Young Death / Nightmarket =

EP by Burial
- Released: 28 November 2016
- Genres: Ambient house; downtempo; future garage
- Length: 13:14
- Label: Hyperdub
- Producer: Burial

Burial chronology
Rival Dealer (2013)	Young Death / Nightmarket (2016)	Subtemple / Beachfires (2017)

Young Death / Nightmarket is the eighth extended play released by William Emmanuel Bevan, an electronic musician known by his stage name Burial, and the 100th release in the catalog of the Hyperdub label. It departs from his previous two extended plays, Kindred (2012) and Rival Dealer (2013), in that it returns to Burial's signature sound consisting of vinyl crackle sounds, rain-filled atmospheres and vocal samples that was on records like Untrue (2007). It is also less dance-based than previous releases by the producer, with the percussion of "Young Death" being submerged by other sounds and "Nightmarket" being devoid of any drum beats.

Young Death / Nightmarket attracted significant media coverage for how it was released. While Hyperdub planned to distribute the record on 28 November 2016, five vinyl copies of the record were "accidentally" sold at the Toronto shop Sonic Boom Records on 25 November as a result of buyers mistaking the product for a secret Black Friday item. This led to Discogs listings of the EP three days before its intended official release and multiple fake uploads of it on services such as YouTube. The EP received positive reviews from professional music journalists in general. Some critics praised its return to the sound of Burial's early material, while reviewers with mixed opinions on the EP felt it lacked substance and had a formless structure.

== Composition ==
Young Death / Nightmarket maintains the signature sound of Burial that was on albums like Untrue (2007), which consists of vinyl crackle sounds, rain-filled atmospheres, and vocal samples, and is less dance-based than previous works by the producer. The songs have what the journalist Paul Carr described as non-traditional "ambiguous, obscure and intangible" structures that excite the listener in having "no idea which thread [Burial] is going to drop and which one he is going to pick up". As Ray Philp of Resident Advisor wrote, Young Death / Nightmarket has an optimistic tone while "resisting the euphoric surges" of Burial's previous EPs Kindred (2012) and Rival Dealer (2013).

A sound effect of a lighter spark opens "Young Death", before it transitions into what Philp of Resident Advisor analogized as "sunrise", a time of day usually not associated with Burial. This "sunrise" part of the song is very clean and introduces soft choir textures, twinkling chimes and what Philp labeled "crisp and clear" vocals. Around the three minute mark, all of the sounds suddenly cut out and let in a different song with Burial's usual darker vibe that includes what Philp analyzed as "a homespun arpeggio casts more daylight onto the music" and evil laughter. As The New York Times critic Jon Pareles described, "Young Death" is "from the farthest fringe of dance music" and most of it includes "steady but nearly subliminal" kick drum beats that are "submerged deep in the mix". The most noticeable sounds on the track are crackly noises and vocals singing phrases such as "don’t fear", "don’t cry" and "I will always be there for you". Pareles wrote that the drum beats are "absorbed by the static, to be replaced by one that’s slower and even less supportive".

Described by Pareles as an "even more shadowy, attenuated travelogue" than "Young Death" and devoid of percussion, "Nightmarket" depicts a set of arpeggio blip lines, which Philp described as a "Blade Runner-esque synth", wind chimes, and voices sounding far, far away yelling, whispering and saying phrases such as "come with me", "the frontier" and "over here". Philp suggested the voice recordings used are samples from the film Alien (1979). Landon Macdonald noted that the track consists of an arrangement that repeats twice; the first cycle "falls off quickly, almost sounding like a car engine giving up, and ambient haze gradually grows louder", while in the second cycle, the synthesizers "build somewhat, like a gathering of like ideas and echoes, and it feels like we are headed to a payoff, but the song descends to a close".

== Release and reception ==
Professional ratings
Aggregate scores
Source	Rating
Metacritic	72/100
Review scores
Source	Rating
AllMusic	3.5/5 stars
Exclaim!	6/10
Fact	6/10
Pitchfork	6.9/10
PopMatters	7/10 stars
Pretty Much Amazing	B
Resident Advisor	3.5/5
Sputnikmusic	2.5/5
Vice (Expert Witness)	(2-star Honorable Mention)

Young Death / Nightmarket was Hyperdub's 100th release. On Black Friday on 25 November 2016, five copies of Young Death / Nightmarket were "accidentally" sold at the Toronto store Sonic Boom Records, and information about the EP was first revealed via Discogs listings that sold the copies. Sonic Boom record buyer Blair Whatmore explained, "[The box the records came in] said ‘artist/title’. We assumed it was a Black Friday secret listing. It wasn’t really clear to us that we weren’t supposed to be selling it." He said that when he went to the store on 26 November 2016, he received a call from a Hyperdub staff member who "was not happy" about the accidental distribution. As a result of the song titles surfacing on Discogs, there were many fake uploads of the song on services such as YouTube; according to Daniel Montesinos-Donaghy of Fact magazine, "some were pretty good" and "some were amazing trolls". While commenters on Discogs initially speculated that Hyperdub planned to officially release the EP on 30 November, the label finally released it to digital stores on the 28 November 2016. According to the Exclaim! writer Connie Przybyslawski, the release of the EP was the most covered Burial-related topic in the press since Untrue (2007).

Writing for AllMusic, Paul Simpson stated that while Young Death / Nightmarket was not as "riveting or intense" as Kindred and Rival Dealer, "it still has the unmistakable Burial sound and it's still unpredictable, so it's still well worth the listener's time." Philp praised the EP for retaining Burial's signature urban-like atmosphere that was not present in his recent works up to that point. However, he also opined that "both tracks lack a certain quality" writing, "there are moments of hymnal beauty, but it's unmoored from the hardcore nostalgia of Bevan's most affecting music". He also disliked that "the context for Young Death / Nightmarket is harder to grasp, and before you know it, it drifts away." MacDonald described the songs as "the audio for some indie VR experience than true Burial tracks", explaining that they are "engaging, but ultimately don’t have the same replay-ability as the classic Bevan stuff".Young Death / Nightmarket was number nine on Gorilla vs. Bear's list of the best albums of 2016, where the writer Chris wrote that ""Young Death" is as haunting and emotional as it gets, and the transportive and cinematic "Nightmarket" should obviously be prominently featured in next year’s Blade Runner sequel."

More mixed reviews of Young Death / Nightmarket were towards the EP's lack of substance. Mark Richardson, writing for Pitchfork, wrote that the album does little to be original apart from having "dark atmospheric beauty," and for an ambient record, "the songs don’t stick around long enough to be immersive." Przybyslawski criticized the EP for being "another cut of the same" in Burial's discography, analyzing that he "emphasizes structural variety over substance, and relies on former sonic signatures to push a release that remains distinguished within the electronic landscape." He also felt that the EP's "conviction" of its Untrue-style sound was "lost to wispy, disembodied vocal samples that are either too invested in structural variance to truly ensnare the listener, or wallow too long in their own moodiness." The reviewer Robert Lowe dismissed the EP as "formless", describing the structure as a "sloppy" and "random mishmash" of "cheap" synthesizer sounds that "feel out of place on a Burial record, and sound like they were ripped straight out of a knockoff Mass Effect soundtrack". He opined that it was "a shame as there are a couple of bright ideas buried in the chaos".

== Track listing ==
All tracks written and produced by Burial.

No.	Title	Length
1.	"Young Death"	5:49
2.	"Nightmarket"	7:25
Total length:		13:14
