= Notu Uronlineu =

Studio album by Scratcha DVA
- Released: 16 October 2016
- Genre: Electronic, experimental
- Length: 39:00
- Label: Hyperdub

Scratcha DVA chronology
Pretty Ugly (2012)	Notu Uronlineu (2016)

Professional ratings
Aggregate scores
Source	Rating
Metacritic	82/100
Review scores
Source	Rating
Resident Advisor	3.6/5
Mixmag	9/10
Pitchfork	71/100
PopMatters	8/10
Mojo	80/100

Notu Uronlineu (stylized NOTU_URONLINEU) is the second studio album by producer Scratcha DVA, released on 16 October 2016 through Hyperdub.

== Track listing ==
All tracks are written by Leon 'Scratcha DVA' Smart

No.	Title	Length
1.	"SHUTDOWNCENTRAL"	1:48
2.	"SUZHOU"	2:24
3.	"MEMORIESOFOFFLINEACTIVITY"	2:49
4.	"AD1_V1"	1:00
5.	"B IT"	4:12
6.	"ALMOSTU" (featuring Roses Gabor, Rae Rae)	3:13
7.	"DAFUQ"	3:19
8.	"NOTU_URONLINEU" (featuring Danalogue)	8:05
9.	"SHUTDOWNCENTRAL 2.1"	1:21
10.	"FD14"	2:44
11.	"DREAMFLIX"	2:58
12.	"SHUTDOWNCENTRAL 3.0"	6:17
13.	"WTSTHEWIFIPASSWORD?"	0:56
