= Ultra (Zomby album) =

Studio album by Zomby
- Released: 2 September 2016
- Genre: Electronic
- Length: 52:14
- Label: Hyperdub

Zomby chronology
With Love (2013)	Ultra (2016)	Mercury's Rainbow (2017)

Singles from Ultra
- 1. "Sweetz" Released: 2016

Ultra is the fourth studio album by British electronic musician Zomby. It was released via Hyperdub on 2 September 2016. It features contributions from Banshee, Burial, Darkstar, and Rezzett.

== Critical reception ==
Professional ratings
Aggregate scores
Source	Rating
AnyDecentMusic?	6.4/10
Metacritic	71/100
Review scores
Source	Rating
AllMusic	3/5 stars
The Guardian	3/5 stars
The Irish Times	2/5 stars
Mixmag	9/10
Mojo	4/5 stars
The Observer	4/5 stars
Pitchfork	7.9/10
Q	3/5 stars
Resident Advisor	3.2/5
Uncut	8/10

At Metacritic, which assigns a weighted average score out of 100 to reviews from mainstream critics, Ultra received an average score of 71 out of 100 based on 18 reviews, indicating "generally favorable reviews".

Andy Kellman of AllMusic gave the album 3 stars out of 5 and said, "Although it's not without some dazzling moments, this is the Zomby album with the lowest quantity of thrills." KC Orcutt of Consequence of Sound gave the album a grade of C, saying, "On Ultra, it simply feels as though something is missing, and overall, makes more sense as an appetizer than the entrée." Isa Jaward of The Observer gave the album 4 stars out of 5, calling it "an unapologetic pastiche of 90s rave culture and retro video games."

=== Accolades ===
Year-end lists for Ultra
Publication	List	Rank	Ref.
Crack	Albums of the Year 2016	73	
The Wire	Top 50 Releases of 2016	48	

== Track listing ==
Ultra track listing
No.	Title	Length
1.	"Reflection"	4:59
2.	"Burst"	2:02
3.	"Fly 2" (with Banshee)	5:28
4.	"E.S.P"	2:59
5.	"I"	2:02
6.	"Glass"	4:29
7.	"Sweetz" (with Burial)	6:58
8.	"Her"	4:51
9.	"Quandary" (with Darkstar)	4:20
10.	"Freeze"	2:17
11.	"Yeti"	2:18
12.	"S.D.Y.F" (with Rezzett)	5:32
13.	"Thaw"	3:56
Total length:		52:14

Digital edition bonus track
No.	Title	Length
14.	"Tenkyuu" (with HKE)	3:38

== Charts ==
Chart (2016)	Peak position
UK Dance Albums (Official Charts)	25
UK Independent Albums (Official Charts)	48
US Top Dance Albums (Billboard)	18
