= Distant Lights =

Distant Lights may refer to:

- Distant Lights (1987 film), an Italian science fiction thriller
- Distant Lights (2003 film), a German drama
- Distant Lights (EP), a 2006 EP by Burial
- "Distant Lights", a 2011 song by Ivy

== See also ==
- Distant Light (disambiguation)
