= Dedication (Zomby album) =

Studio album by Zomby
- Released: 11 July 2011
- Genre: Electronic
- Length: 35:30
- Label: 4AD
- Producer: Zomby

Zomby chronology
Where Were U in '92? (2008)	Dedication (2011)	Nothing (2011)

Dedication is the second studio album by British electronic music producer Zomby, released on 11 July 2011 through 4AD.

== Release ==
The album's first single "Natalia's Song" was embroiled in controversy in early 2012. Electronic producer Reark claims he wrote the loop that comprises the main portion of the song in 2007, and that he was not credited by Zomby for his contribution; in response, 4AD later amended the track credits to include Reark's name.

== Critical reception ==
Professional ratings
Aggregate scores
Source	Rating
AnyDecentMusic?	7.6/10
Metacritic	79/100
Review scores
Source	Rating
AllMusic	4/5 stars
The A.V. Club	B+
Consequence of Sound	B
The Guardian	4/5 stars
The Independent	4/5 stars
Los Angeles Times	3.5/4 stars
No Ripcord	6/10
Pitchfork	7.6/10
Spin	8/10
XLR8R	9/10

Dedication received positive reviews from music critics. At Metacritic, which assigns a normalized rating out of 100 to reviews from mainstream critics, the album received an average score of 79, based on 28 reviews, indicating "generally favorable reviews".

Dave Simpson of The Guardian gave note of the "pensive, thought-provoking sadness" throughout the record's production, highlighting the melodies as being reminiscent of the "dark, inverted negative[s]" synthpop of the Human League and the "minimal pianos and bare clonks" having a mixture of Keith Jarrett and Spooky that's "somewhere between dubstep and contemporary classical", concluding with, "But however you define it, its beautiful atmosphere of sadness and decay is hard to deny." The Independent's Andy Gill praised Zomby for utilizing a minimalist approach to electronic music throughout the track listing, while also adding substance to them, concluding that "there's a pervasive haunted sense of loss and melancholy that links these 16 tracks together, giving Dedication a depth and elegance not often found in more dance-focused dubstep." Randall Roberts of the Los Angeles Times said that, "Each of the thousands of individual beats, bumps, dots and dashes on Dedication sound forged with a sculptor's eye for form and shape, crafted and shined until they glisten." Alex Young of Consequence of Sound felt that "this latest offering from the spectral producer proves much more enduring a record than he seemed capable of a couple of years back and one that makes as solid a case as is imaginable for integrating dubstep into the mainstream as one of the genre's first great releases on a label not named Hyperdub or NinjaTune."

Pitchfork contributor Jess Harvell said that despite lacking elements from previous works she commended Zomby for crafting "the most stylistically wide-ranging record he's released yet," giving praise to his evolution from "game cartridge kitsch" to rhythms that are reminiscent of Boards of Canada, saying that its "in many ways the work of a producer pushing himself to see how hard and how far he can push his music into new places." She added that listeners might be put off by the musically varied tracks containing two- or three-minute runtimes that hint at something lengthier and more fleshed out. Matt Oliver of Clash wrote that, "His quill inviting tomes of humbling electronic stealth to lash out in cold blood (the pure grime 'Vortex' is an open invite for emcees to taunt and insult over), and as skittish as the suspicion of his persona affords, 'Dedication' will raise more questions than provide answers. Exactly the 'out of the palm' manoeuvre Zomby wants you to eat from." Mark Davison, writing for No Ripcord, said, "Zomby may have the potential to be the most brilliant, versatile British electronic musician since Richard D. James, but his distant, maverick act does him few favours here – what he needed was somebody to sit him down and tell him to focus on one idea at a time. As it is, Dedication seems like a bit of a missed opportunity; as a collection of ideas it may be incredible, but as an album it's just insubstantial."

It ranked at number 8 on Spin's "20 Best Dance Albums of 2011" list. The magazine's writer Michaelangelo Matos said that "Dedication has plenty of bang in its back end, but its early, slower tracks are what lodge in your mind's ear, whether it's Zomby cutting a Russian pop singer into haunted phenomes on "Natalia's Song" or Panda Bear crooning over the squiggly skank of "Things Fall Apart.""

== Track listing ==
Dedication track listing
No.	Title	Length
1.	"Witch Hunt"	1:46
2.	"Natalia's Song" (with Reark)	4:03
3.	"Alothea"	2:49
4.	"Black Orchid"	1:33
5.	"Riding with Death"	2:02
6.	"Vortex"	1:58
7.	"Things Fall Apart"	2:50
8.	"Salamander"	0:51
9.	"Lucifer"	0:56
10.	"Digital Rain"	3:29
11.	"Vanquish"	0:58
12.	"A Devil Lay Here"	2:51
13.	"Florence"	1:39
14.	"Haunted"	2:18
15.	"Basquiat"	2:15
16.	"Mozaik"	3:12
Total length:		35:30

Japanese edition bonus tracks
No.	Title	Length
17.	"Haunted Part 2"	1:37
18.	"Hexxx"	2:06
19.	"Gates of Hell"	1:55
20.	"Labyrinth"	3:10
21.	"Digital Fractal"	3:55
22.	"Sens"	1:59
23.	"It Was All a Dream"	3:51
24.	"Trapdoor"	3:27
25.	"Stargate 5"	3:29
26.	"Ecstasy Versions"	2:42

== Charts ==
Chart (2011)	Peak position
Belgian Albums (Ultratop Flanders)	91
UK Dance Albums (Official Charts)	26
UK Independent Albums (Official Charts)	35
US Heatseekers Albums (Billboard)	42
US Top Dance Albums (Billboard)	20
