= Pretty Ugly (Scratcha DVA album) =

Studio album by Scratcha DVA
- Released: 2012
- Recorded: London, UK, Cape Town, South Africa and Atlanta, USA.
- Genre: Electronic
- Length: 44:00
- Label: Hyperdub

Scratcha DVA chronology
Pretty Ugly (2012)	NOTU URONLINEU (2016)

Professional ratings
Aggregate scores
Source	Rating
Metacritic	69/100
Review scores
Source	Rating
Clash	8/10
NME	3.5/5 stars
Pitchfork	6.4/10

Pretty Ugly is the debut studio album by Scratcha DVA. It was released 19 March 2012 through Hyperdub.

== Production ==
It was recorded in London, Cape Town, and Atlanta.

== Critical reception ==
Pitchfork wrote that the album "wears its polemical heart on its sleeve, offering a manifesto for an approach to dance music that looks askew, glances awry, and always moves out of kilter." The Quietus wrote that Pretty Ugly contains "a decent scattering of funky-ish house tracks," while allowing Scratcha DVA the opportunity to be more "stylistically divergent." BBC Music called it "an exhilarating debut album from Leon Smart’s DVA alias, full of complexity." Exclaim! wrote that the album's "decidedly upbeat atmosphere dodges any pattern or semblance."

== Track listing ==
All tracks are written by Leon Smart

No.	Title	Length
1.	"Reach the Sun"	3:45
2.	"Just Vybe" (featuring Fatima)	2:32
3.	"Polyphonic Dreams"	4:58
4.	"Pretty Ugly" (featuring Cornelia)	4:53
5.	"Bare Fuzz"	5:03
6.	"Madness" (featuring Viktar Dupleix)	3:10
7.	"Fire Fly" (featuring Zaki Ibrahim)	2:42
8.	"Why You Do?" (featuring A.L.)	2:24
9.	"The Big 5ive"	4:49
10.	"Eye Know" (featuring Natalie Maddix)	5:37
11.	"33rd Degree" (featuring Muhsinah)	3:48
12.	"Where I Belong"	3:46
