= Antidawn =

EP by Burial
- Released: 6 January 2022
- Genres: Ambient; sound collage
- Length: 43:30
- Label: Hyperdub

Burial chronology
Chemz / Dolphinz (2021)	Antidawn (2022)	Streetlands (2022)

Antidawn is an EP by British electronic musician Burial, released 6 January 2022 via Hyperdub.

== Composition ==
Antidawn is a collection of beatless ambient music, cementing the direction that Burial had taken since his late 2010s work, and was his most ambient work yet. The tracks have unconventional structures and focus on distorted vocal samples and crackles, combining into a "loose, amorphous soundscape". Tom Kingsley of Clash wrote that Burial's only previous track "that comes close" to Antidawn was the 2021 B-side "Dolphinz". Resident Advisor reviewer Emeka Okonkwo described it as a release of "spectral, wintery ambient sound-collages" and compared it to previous Burial tracks "Rival Dealer" and "Beachfires". For Loud and Quiet critic Luke Cartledge, the EP is a "familiar blend of rainy, minor-key textures and forlorn-sounding field recordings". "New Love" is the only track to contain percussive elements, although they are vague and distant.

Kingsley compared the music to the KLF's Chill Out (1990) due to their use of collage "as a way to convey a sense of movement, not only through space ("all the way down the East Coast") but through time" and for their use of musique concrète, "piecing together functional, everyday sounds – the strike of a lighter, coughs and muffled voices, metallic clangs – to create something totally otherworldly."

== Reception ==
Antidawn ratings
Aggregate scores
Source	Rating
AnyDecentMusic?	7.9/10
Metacritic	81/100
Review scores
Source	Rating
AllMusic	3.5/5 stars
Beats Per Minute	90%
Clash	9/10
Crack	8/10
Loud and Quiet	8/10
NME	4/5 stars
Pitchfork	7.3/10
PopMatters	8/10

According to the review aggregator Metacritic, Antidawn received "universal acclaim" based on a weighted average score of 81 out of 100 from 7 critic scores.

John Wohlmacher of Beats Per Minute wrote, "At almost 44 minutes and rich in complex structures, these five sound collages are state of the art electronic compositions that unite the elements present on his LPs with the vapor-like ambience of his 12 inch output." In Crack, Jasmine Kent-Smith described Anitidawn as "a loosely-stitched patchwork of hums, crackles and clicks, plus organic sounds such as the clearing of a throat". While noting that some Burial fans may find it disappointing on comparison to Untrue (2007), the writer deemed it an impressive release that would grow on listeners, who would come to enjoy Burial's fixation on his "ambient inclinations". Tom Kinsley of Clash similarly described it as "delicate, complex music that demands relistening". He said that while listeners expecting "another dubstep masterpiece" would initially find the EP frustrating, it would grow on open-minded listeners. "Love it or hate it," he concluded, "Antidawn is one of the most unique releases you’re likely to hear in 2022."

=== Year-end lists ===
Antidawn year-end lists
Publication	#	Ref.
Gorilla vs. Bear	14	
PopMatters	64	
Slant Magazine	32	

== Track listing ==
All tracks are written by W. Bevan.

Antidawn track listing
No.	Title	Length
1.	"Strange Neighbourhood"	11:04
2.	"Antidawn"	8:43
3.	"Shadow Paradise"	10:20
4.	"New Love"	7:13
5.	"Upstairs Flat"	6:07
Total length:		43:30
