= Truant / Rough Sleeper =

EP by Burial
- Released: 14 December 2012
- Recorded: 2012
- Genres: Future garage; downtempo; dubstep; 2-step garage
- Length: 25:38
- Label: Hyperdub
- Producer: Burial

Burial chronology
Kindred (2012)	Truant / Rough Sleeper (2012)	Rival Dealer (2013)

Professional ratings
Review scores
Source	Rating
Beats Per Minute	86%
Consequence of Sound	4/5 stars
Fact	4/5
MSN Music (Expert Witness)	A−
Pitchfork	8.4/10
Resident Advisor	4.0/5
The Skinny	5/5 stars
XLR8R	7/10

Truant / Rough Sleeper is the sixth extended play by British electronic music producer Burial. It was digitally released by Hyperdub on 14 December 2012, with a vinyl and CD release following on 17 December 2012.

== Track listing ==
All tracks written and produced by Burial.

No.	Title	Length
1.	"Truant"	11:48
2.	"Rough Sleeper"	13:50
Total length:		25:38

== Charts ==
Chart (2012–13)	Peak position
UK Physical Singles (OCC)	4
US Hot Singles Sales (Billboard)	4
US Dance/Electronic Singles Sales (Billboard)	1
