= Manthe Ribane =

South African artist, performer, and musician

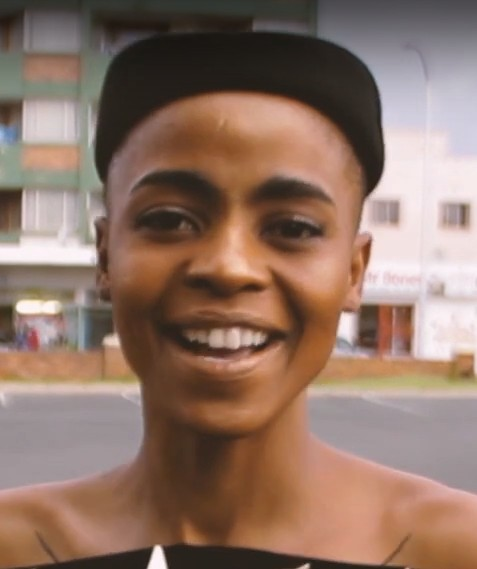
- Ribane in 2016
- Occupation(s): Artist, performer, musician

Ribane on her artistic process

Manthe Ribane is an artist, performer, and musician based in South Africa and the Creative Director at 113 Studios. OkayAfrica described her as a "master of Afrofuturism" in her style and aesthetic.

Dazed wrote that, of the many performance mediums for which Ribane is known, her dance was her "most imaginative and magnetic". Well-known in South Africa's dance scene, she has mastered styles including pantsula, crumping, and voguing. She danced for Die Antwoord on tour. In 2019, she choreographed La Maison Noir: The Gift And The Curse, a visual novel by Petite Noir.

As a musician, Ribane has collaborated with rapper Spoek Mathambo. With Hyperdub producer Okzharp, she released a gqom EP in 2016 and a debut R&B-influenced album, Closer Apart, in 2018.
