= Scratcha DVA =

British electronic musician, producer and DJ

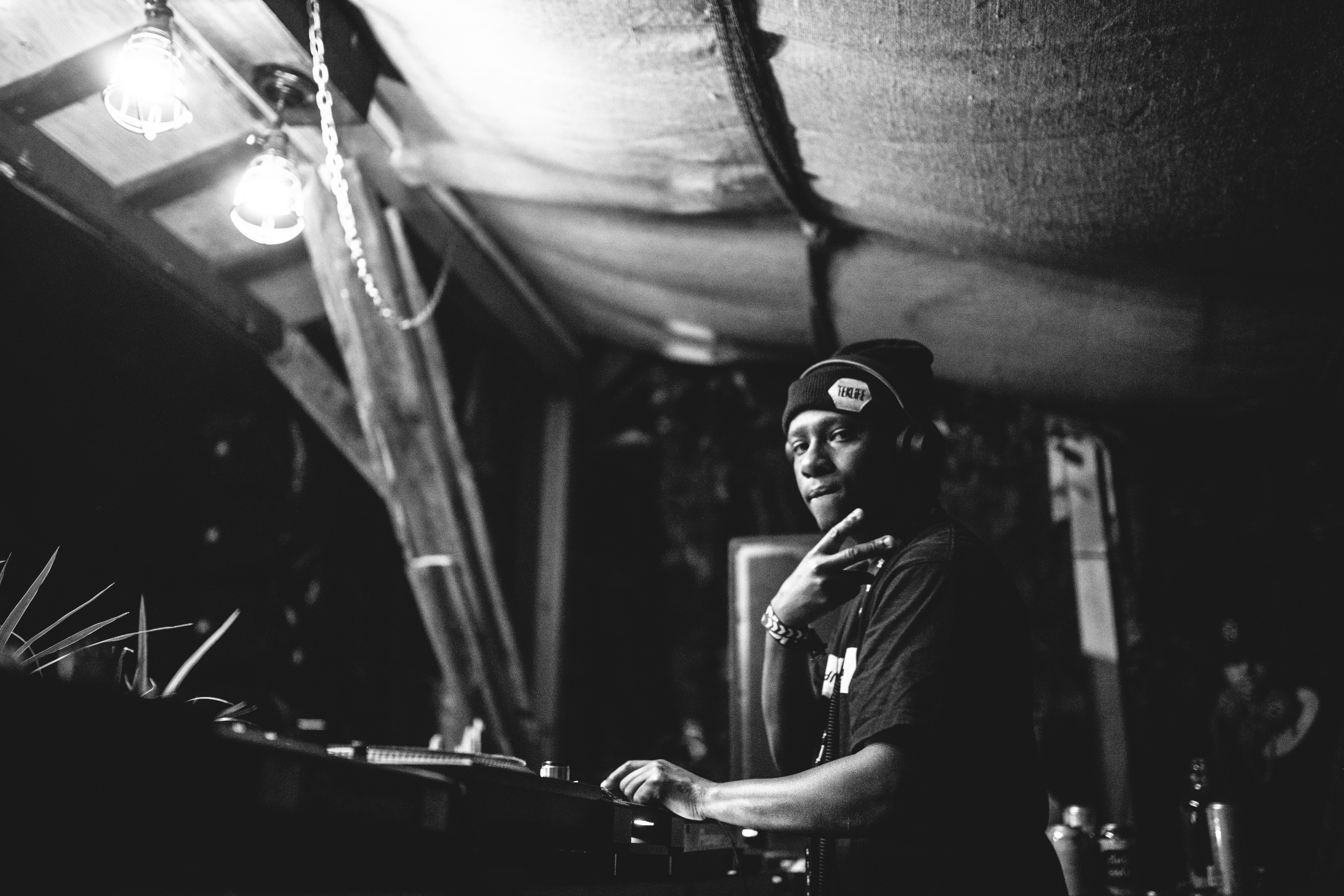

Background information
- Birth name: Leon Smart
- Genres: Electronic; experimental; UK Gqom
- Occupations: Musician; DJ; producer; radio host
- Years active: 2001–present
- Labels: DVA Music; Hyperdub; AllYallRecords
- Formerly of: Aftershock
- Website: scratchadva.bandcamp.com

Scratcha DVA also known as DJ Scratcha, DVA [Hi; Emotions], Scratchclart and DVA is a British electronic musician, producer and DJ often associated with DVA Music, Hyperdub and Rinse FM. His debut album, Pretty Ugly (2012) and second album, Notu Uronlineu (2016) were both released on Hyperdub.

== Early career ==
Scratcha DVA's musical background includes playing and making jungle, drum and bass, UK garage, grime, UK funky, house and other electronic music. He joined up with Terror Danjah forming the Reckless Crew with D Double E, MC Bruza, MC Skanker, MC Triple Threat, MC Hitman Hyper and others. He played sets on London pirate radio stations, such as, Flava FM, London Underground FM, Deja Vu FM and Rinse FM.

== Radio career ==
His radio career started in 1997 as DJ Scratcha, regularly attending stations such as Rinse FM and Deja Vu, Flava FM, and London Underground FM.

In 2006, Scratcha had a Friday night grime show on Rinse FM. After noticing Scratcha liked to talk a lot on the mic, he was later asked to do the Rinse FM breakfast show. The show was popularly known as The Grimey Breakfast Show. The show had a wide variety of guests coming through and co-hosting. Scratcha announced he would be leaving in 2012.

From 2012 to 2016, Scratcha co-hosted the Hyperdub label. After spending 10 years with radio stations, his last show was on 12 June 2016.

In 2016, Scratcha started a bi-weekly show on Radar Radio.

On 21 October 2021, Scratcha did a one-off hosting of the NTS breakfast show. Calling for listeners' favourite songs of all time, he briefly played Vengaboys after it was requested in the NTS chat. In November, following how well-received his hosting was, Scratcha was announced as one of NTS' resident hosts for the weekday morning. He currently hosts the 11am to 1pm slot on Friday. On 15 November 2024, he announced in his show he is leaving NTS.

== Current work ==
In October 2016, Scratcha DVA released his second album Notu Uronlineu which was recorded completely in the dark.

In August 2017, he disestablished his record label of 15 years, DVA Music, to concentrate on his new label, AllYallRecords.

In 2025, Scratcha returned to Rinse FM with a Monday residency.

== Discography ==
=== Albums ===
- Pretty Ugly (2012)
- Notu Uronlineu (2016)

=== Compilations ===
- The Voice of Grime Vol 1 (2006)

=== EPs ===
- The Jelly Roll EP (DVA, 2009)
- DVA ft. Cooly G – DIS Boy (DVA, 2010)
- DVA ft. GuGu – The Afro Cuban EP (DVA, 2011)
- Fly Juice (Hyperdub, 2012)
- Mad Hatter (Hyperdub, 2013)
- AllYallRecords (Hyperdub, 2015)
- Take It All (Hyperdub, 2016)

=== Singles ===
- DVA featuring Alahna – "I'm Leaving" (DVA, 2008)
- DVA ft. Badness, Riko, Killa P & Flowdan – "Bullet a' Go Fly" (Keysound)
- DVA – "Natty/Ganja" (Hyperdub)
- Baobinga & Mensah & DVA – "N.S.G. / This One's Wavey" (Build)
- DVA – "Just Vybe (Soule:Power Mix) / Step 2 Funk" (Hyperdub)
- DVA – "Madness / Polyphonic Dreams" (Hyperdub, 2011)
- DVA, Sinjin Hawke & Killa P – "Worst" (Visceral Vaults, 2017)
- DVA [Hi:Emotions] – "Dead End" (DVA, 2017)
