= With Love (Zomby album) =

Studio album by Zomby
- Released: 17 June 2013
- Genre: Electronic
- Length: 80:04
- Label: 4AD
- Producer: Zomby

Zomby chronology
Nothing (2011)	With Love (2013)	Ultra (2016)

With Love is the third studio album by British electronic music producer Zomby. It was released on 17 June 2013 through 4AD.

== Critical reception ==
Professional ratings
Aggregate scores
Source	Rating
AnyDecentMusic?	6.9/10
Metacritic	71/100
Review scores
Source	Rating
AllMusic	4.5/5 stars
The Independent	4/5 stars
Mixmag	4/5
Mojo	3/5 stars
NME	6/10
Pitchfork	7.9/10
Q	4/5 stars
Resident Advisor	3.5/5
Rolling Stone	3.5/5 stars
Spin	6/10

According to the review aggregator Metacritic, With Love received "generally favorable reviews" based on a weighted average score of 71 out of 100 from 27 critic scores.

=== Accolades ===
Year-end lists for With Love
Publication	List	Rank	Ref.
Crack	Albums of the Year	18	

== Track listing ==
Part One
No.	Title	Length
1.	"As Darkness Falls"	2:08
2.	"Ascension"	0:59
3.	"Horrid"	3:09
4.	"If I Will"	2:23
5.	"Isis"	2:39
6.	"It's Time"	3:39
7.	"Memories"	4:04
8.	"Orion"	1:14
9.	"Overdose"	2:34
10.	"Pray for Me"	1:50
11.	"Rendezvous"	2:51
12.	"The Things You Do"	1:31
13.	"This One"	1:58
14.	"Vanishment"	1:49
15.	"VI-XI"	3:38
16.	"VxV"	1:50
17.	"777"	3:07

Part Two
No.	Title	Length
1.	"Black Rose"	2:25
2.	"Digital Smoke"	1:51
3.	"Entropy Sketch"	1:23
4.	"Glass Ocean"	2:25
5.	"How to Ascend"	2:55
6.	"I Saw Golden Light"	2:18
7.	"Pyrex Nights" (featuring Last Japan)	3:13
8.	"Quickening"	2:46
9.	"Reflection in Black Glass"	1:51
10.	"Shiva"	1:06
11.	"Soliloquy"	3:57
12.	"Sphinx"	2:48
13.	"Sunshine in November"	1:13
14.	"Vast Emptiness"	3:13
15.	"White Smoke"	2:04
16.	"With Love"	3:13

== Charts ==
Chart (2013)	Peak position
Belgian Albums (Ultratop Flanders)	138
UK Albums (Official Charts)	153
UK Dance Albums (Official Charts)	29
UK Independent Albums (Official Charts)	30
US Heatseekers Albums (Billboard)	34
