= Ghost Hardware =

EP by Burial
- Released: 25 June 2007
- Genres: Ambient; downtempo; dubstep; 2-step garage; trip hop
- Length: 15:44
- Language: English
- Label: Hyperdub (HDB004)

Burial EP chronology
Distant Lights (2006)	Ghost Hardware (2007)	Moth / Wolf Cub (2009)

Professional ratings
Review scores
Source	Rating
Stylus Magazine	C

Ghost Hardware is the third EP release by English electronic musician Burial, released on the Hyperdub label in 2007.

== Track listing ==
All music is composed by Burial.

No.	Title	Length
1.	"Ghost Hardware"	4:54
2.	"Shutta"	5:03
3.	"Exit Woundz"	5:47
Total length:		15:44
