= Untrue (album) =

Studio album by Burial
- Released: 5 November 2007
- Recorded: 2007
- Genres: Dubstep; UK garage; ambient
- Length: 50:28 (CD); 39:44 (vinyl); 51:17 (vinyl, 2016 reissue)
- Label: Hyperdub
- Producer: Burial

Burial chronology
Ghost Hardware (2007)	Untrue (2007)	Street Halo (2011)

Singles from Untrue
- 1. "Archangel" Released: 2007; 2. "Ghost Hardware" Released: 10 December 2007

Untrue is the second and most recent studio album by British electronic music producer Burial. Released on 5 November 2007 by Hyperdub, the album was produced by Burial in 2007 using the digital audio editing software Sound Forge. Untrue builds on the sound established by Burial on his eponymous debut album from the previous year, notably through its more prominent use of pitch-shifted and time-stretched vocal samples. The album, like Burial's previous work, also draws on influences from UK garage, ambient, and hardcore music.

Untrue received widespread acclaim from critics, who praised Burial's production style on the album and generally hailed it as a progression and improvement over his prior musical output. It placed on the albums charts of Belgium and the United Kingdom and produced a single, "Ghost Hardware". Untrue later appeared in several publications' lists of the year's best albums, and received nominations for the Mercury Prize and the Shortlist Music Prize.

In the years following its release, Untrue has since been viewed as a landmark album in the dubstep genre, and in electronic music in general. In a 2017 article, Pitchfork called the album "the most important electronic album of the century so far".

== Production ==
Following the release of his self-titled debut album in 2006, Burial began work on a second studio album. He felt pressured to follow up Burial and worked several hours a day creating new songs and learning how to use new sound-editing programs. He produced various songs that he described as "darker" and "more technical", but scrapped the material because he grew tired of them from the long hours he spent on their production. Burial then decided to take a new approach; instead of spending extended periods of time working on individual songs, he sought to "make a glowing, buzzing album, do it really fast; to cheer [himself] up". He produced much of Untrue "in the dead of the night", later recalling: "I would sit around waiting for night to fall, wait for summer to end. Or I would go out, wait for it to get dark, and then I'd go back and work on it, sort of hypnotise myself."

Burial produced Untrue using the software Sound Forge. He aimed to create songs that reflected his musical preferences, particularly UK hardcore music, while also incorporating "a dose of real life... something people can relate to." Burial was particularly motivated to add vocals to the songs on Untrue, influenced by the vocal-based work of producers such as A Guy Called Gerald, Foul Play, and Omni Trio; he cited the "girl-next-door" quality of the vocals in their music as having inspired his own approach to vocal production. In the absence of a session vocalist, Burial had friends sing over the phone and used samples of a cappellas, editing individual words to form sentences. He also frequently sampled atmospheric sounds such as rain and vinyl hiss, as well as incidental noises taken from a variety of sources, including the video game Metal Gear Solid and the sound of car keys from a Vin Diesel film.

== Composition ==
Raw, rolling drums and sub is the sound I love... and if you don't get that then you won't ever get it.

— Burial, late 2007

Untrue, which has been categorised as a dubstep album and described as a tribute to UK garage, retains several musical elements that marked the sound of Burial, including heavy use of sampling and Burial's trademark skipped drum patterns. In contrast to Burial's past work, however, the tracks on Untrue more prominently feature pitch-shifted and time-stretched vocals, mainly sourced from manipulated samples of R&B tracks. Throughout the album's run time, the use of beats is varied; tracks such as "Archangel" and "Near Dark" feature uptempo, skittering beats, while tracks such as the beatless interludes "Endorphin" and "In McDonalds" place emphasis on isolated vocal samples overlaid on ambience. The mix of vocals and skipped drum patterns on Untrue has been likened to 2-step garage and early jungle music. Dan Hancox of The Guardian wrote that while the album is "still distinctly DIY, some of the melancholy of Burial's debut has dissipated on [Untrue], which is more heavily loaded with garage-inflected vocals, and more upbeat as a consequence." Dave Stelfox of The Village Voice expressed a similar sentiment, noting a "shift from dystopian melancholy to restrained optimism." Critics have noted that the increased emphasis on vocal effects on Untrue over his previous works contributes to its more emotional nature. Pitchfork critic Philip Sherburne wrote that Untrue is "not a pop album, at least not by Top 40 standards, but his voices—male, female, and ambiguous—wriggle deep into the listener's consciousness." Burial uses pitch-shifting to make male vocals sound feminine and female vocals sound masculine, resulting in the album's vocals taking on a more androgynous nature. Sherburne stated that "they toy with r&b's conventions, heavy with breath and rippling with trills and melisma, some of it digitally imposed."

References to angels and supernatural phenomena recur in several of the album's vocal samples and track titles, including "Archangel" and "Ghost Hardware", and Burial has stated that these were intended to connect to people "maybe taking a battering in their life, but [who] still handle themselves with grace". He added: "When you think of some of the things people go through, everyday troubles, relationship things, other stuff. Everyone knows those sorts of feelings. I wanted to do songs about that low-key stuff."

== Release ==
On 17 October 2007, Scottish musician and Hyperdub label owner Kode9 appeared as a guest on the BBC programme Radio 1's Experimental Show, where he played several tracks from Untrue. Following much anticipation, Untrue was released by Hyperdub on 5 November 2007. It was released as thirteen-track Digipak CD and a nine-track double vinyl LP on which some beatless pieces were edited out. The 2016 reissue of the vinyl LP reintroduced the beatless pieces. Untrue debuted at number 121 on the UK Albums Chart for the week ending 17 November 2007. In the Belgian region of Flanders, Untrue spent one week at number 57 on the Ultratop 50 albums chart. On the Ultratop Alternative Albums chart, it debuted at number 23 and remained on the chart for eight weeks. Hyperdub issued "Archangel" as the album's first single, and it peaked at number 21 on the Flanders Ultratip singles chart. "Ghost Hardware", which had previously been released on the Burial EP of the same name in June 2007, was made available for free download in the United Kingdom as the iTunes Store single of the week on 10 December 2007.

== Critical reception ==
Professional ratings
Aggregate scores
Source	Rating
Metacritic	90/100
Review scores
Source	Rating
AllMusic	5/5 stars
Blender	4/5 stars
The Guardian	5/5 stars
MSN Music (Consumer Guide)	A
The Observer	5/5 stars
Pitchfork	8.4/10
Q	4/5 stars
Resident Advisor	5/5
Spin	4.5/5 stars
URB	4.5/5 stars

Untrue was widely acclaimed by contemporary critics. At Metacritic, which assigns a normalised rating out of 100 to reviews from mainstream publications, the album has received an average score of 90, based on 23 reviews. Chris Mann of Resident Advisor wrote that Untrue "lays another strong claim to Burial being the most innovative and expressive artist not only in dubstep, but in the whole of electronic music." Jason Birchmeier of AllMusic praised Untrue as being "arguably even better than its predecessor" and called it an album "where the music... takes center stage with no distractions or sideshows, where there's never the urge to skip to the next track, because they're all part and parcel of the greater whole." Writing for The Guardian, Dorian Lynskey stated that "Untrue confirms that Burial possesses not just the keen ear of a Lee Perry or Martin Hannett [...] but a capacious heart," calling the album "as addictive as its predecessor." For MSN Music, Robert Christgau described the album as "emotional, which helps its funk a lot, and eventful, which helps its interest even more", comparing Burial's "sonic imagination" to that of English musician Tricky.

Tom King of Drowned in Sound branded Untrue as an improvement over Burial's debut, writing: "What gives this album more depth is the focus, the rolling symmetry and cinema." Joe Gross of Spin wrote that with the album, Burial "deepens and expands his emotional range". PopMatters critic Tal Rosenberg felt that the "seamlessness" of Untrue distinguished it from his past work and advised listeners not to approach the album "as a dubstep record, but as a record, period." Dave Hughes from Slant Magazine deemed Untrue "ambient music concealing its cracked modern heart with a stiff upper lip", recommending it should be listened to at a high volume. In Pitchfork, Philip Sherburne praised Burial's use of vocal samples and wrote that the album managed to retain the style and overall vibe of Burial and improve over it, describing it as a "deeper album—richer, more complex, more enveloping." Uncut published a more lukewarm review of Untrue, characterising it as "altogether warmer than its predecessor."

=== Accolades ===
Untrue appeared on numerous publications' year-end and decade-end top albums lists. Based on aggregated review scores, Untrue is ranked the most acclaimed album of 2007—tied with The Field's From Here We Go Sublime—by Metacritic. Resident Advisor and Sputnikmusic named it the best album of the year, while it was ranked the year's second best album by Fact and The Wire. Untrue also placed within the top ten of year-end best album lists by The Observer and Pitchfork, as well as at number 27 on The Village Voice's year-end Pazz & Jop critics' poll. In his Pazz & Jop ballot, poll creator Robert Christgau ranked it the tenth best album of the year. The album was nominated for a Mercury Prize in 2008, losing to Elbow's The Seldom Seen Kid. It was also nominated for the 2007 Shortlist Music Prize, which was eventually awarded to Feist's The Reminder. Untrue experienced a 1004% sales increase in the week following the Mercury Prize awards ceremony, allowing it to re-enter the UK Albums Chart and reach a new peak of number 58. The critical and commercial success of Untrue prompted Burial, whose identity until then had been anonymous, to disclose his real name—William Bevan—and give out interviews to the media.

Fact named Untrue the best album of the 2000s and stated that Burial "stripped UK garage of its twitchy micro-textures and created a fabulous new strain of future soul." Resident Advisor listed it as the third best album of the decade, with reviewer Derek Miller calling it "a mastery of sample stitching". Several other publications, including Pitchfork, Slant Magazine, and Stylus Magazine, included Untrue in their decade-end lists of best albums. NPR named the album one of the 50 Most Important Recordings of the Decade, while The A.V. Club put it on its list of the best electronic albums of the decade. Rolling Stone placed Untrue at number eleven on their list of the greatest EDM albums of all time, while Q listed it as one of three essential dubstep releases. In 2017, critic Simon Reynolds, writing in Pitchfork, assessed Untrue as the "most important electronic album of the century so far", citing its impact on the British dance scene "in the form of a self-conscious turn towards emotionality: not the primary-color, explosive emotions of old skool rave, but subtle shades of introspective melancholy". In 2019, the album was ranked 31st on The Guardian's 100 Best Albums of the 21st Century list. In 2024, Apple Music ranked Untrue as the 94th best album of all time.

== Track listing ==
All tracks written and produced by Burial.

CD issue
No.	Title	Length
1.	Untitled	0:46
2.	"Archangel"	3:58
3.	"Near Dark"	3:54
4.	"Ghost Hardware"	4:53
5.	"Endorphin"	2:57
6.	"Etched Headplate"	5:59
7.	"In McDonalds"	2:07
8.	"Untrue"	6:16
9.	"Shell of Light"	4:40
10.	"Dog Shelter"	2:59
11.	"Homeless"	5:20
12.	"UK"	1:40
13.	"Raver"	4:59
Total length:		50:28

Japanese CD issue bonus tracks
No.	Title	Length
14.	"Shutta"	5:02
15.	"Exit Woundz"	5:49
Total length:		61:19

2007 vinyl issue
No.	Title	Length
1.	"Archangel"	3:58
2.	"Near Dark"	3:54
3.	"Homeless"	5:20
4.	"Shell of Light"	4:40
5.	"Raver"	4:59
6.	"Etched Headplate"	5:59
7.	"Untrue"	6:16
8.	"UK"	1:40
9.	"Endorphin"	2:57
10.	"In McDonalds"	2:07
Total length:		39:44

2016 vinyl reissue
No.	Title	Length
1.	Untitled	1:25
2.	"Archangel"	4:00
3.	"Near Dark"	3:54
4.	"Ghost Hardware"	4:49
5.	"Endorphin"	3:01
6.	"Etched Headplate"	5:59
7.	"In Mcdonalds"	2:14
8.	"Untrue"	6:17
9.	"Shell of Light"	4:39
10.	"Dog Shelter"	3:01
11.	"Homeless"	5:21
12.	"UK"	1:40
13.	"Raver"	4:57
Total length:		51:17

== Charts ==
Chart (2007–2008)	Peak position
Belgian Albums (Ultratop Flanders)	57
Belgian Alternative Albums (Ultratop Flanders)	23
UK Albums (Official Charts)	58
UK Dance Albums (Official Charts)	4
UK Independent Albums (Official Charts)	7

== Certifications ==
Region	Certification	Certified units/sales
United Kingdom (BPI)	Silver	60,000^{‡}
^{‡} Sales+streaming figures based on certification alone.
