= Distant Light =

Distant Light may refer to:

- Distant Light (novel), a 2013 novel by Antonio Moresco
- Distant Light (Alex Lloyd album), 2003
- Distant Light (The Hollies album), 1971
- Distant Light (Renée Fleming album), 2017
- Distant Light, violin concerto by Peteris Vasks

== See also ==
- Distant Lights (disambiguation)
