= UK bass =

UK music scene and genre

- Stylistic origins: Dubstep; post-dubstep; future garage; 2-step; house; UK funky; R&B; grime; IDM; techno; other forms of electronic dance music
- Cultural origins: Mid-to-late 2000s, United Kingdom

Other topics
- Electronic musical instrument; sub-bass; record labels; dance music; rave; bassline

UK bass, also called bass music, is a genre of electronic dance music that emerged in the United Kingdom during the mid-2000s under the influence of diverse genres such as house, grime, dubstep, future garage, R&B, and UK funky. The term "UK bass" came into use as artists began ambiguously blending the sounds of these defined genres while maintaining an emphasis on percussive, bass-led rhythm.

UK bass is sometimes conflated with bassline or post-dubstep. It is not to be confused with the hip-hop and electro-based genre Miami bass, which is sometimes called "bass music" as well.

== Origins ==
The breadth of styles that have come to be associated with the term preclude it from being a specific musical genre. Pitchfork writer Martin Clark has suggested that "well-meaning attempts to loosely define the ground we're covering here are somewhat futile and almost certainly flawed. This is not one genre. However, given the links, interaction, and free-flowing ideas… you can't dismiss all these acts as unrelated." Dubstep producer Skream is quoted in an interview with The Independent in September 2011 as saying:

The word dubstep is being used by a lot of people and there were a lot of people being tagged with the dubstep brush. They don't want to be tagged with it and shouldn't be tagged with it – that's not what they're pushing... When I say 'UK bass', it's what everyone UK is associated with so it would be a lot easier if it was called that."

In the United Kingdom, bass music has had major mainstream success since the late 2000s and early 2010s, with artists such as James Blake, Benga, Burial, SBTRKT, Sophie, Rustie, Zomby, and Skream. The term "post-dubstep" has been used synonymously to refer to artists, such as Blake and Mount Kimbie whose work draws on UK garage, 2-step, and other forms of underground dance music, as well as ambient music and early R&B. Outside of nightclubs, UK bass has mainly been promoted and played on Internet radio stations such as Sub.FM and Rinse FM.
