= Rival Dealer =

EP by Burial
- Released: 11 December 2013
- Genres: UK garage; ambient; broken beat
- Length: 28:33
- Label: Hyperdub
- Producer: Burial

Burial chronology
Truant / Rough Sleeper (2012)	Rival Dealer (2013)	Young Death / Nightmarket (2016)

Rival Dealer is the seventh extended play by British electronic music producer Burial. It was released digitally by Hyperdub on 11 December 2013, with a physical release following five days later.

== Background ==
On 2 December 2013, a Cargo Records distribution email revealed that record label Hyperdub would release a three-track EP of Burial material on 16 December in vinyl and CD formats, designated with the catalogue number HDB080. His first release since Truant / Rough Sleeper the year prior, it was also revealed to have a 28-minute running time. On 11 December, Hyperdub made the EP available to purchase digitally through their website and uploaded its three tracks—"Rival Dealer", "Hiders" and "Come Down to Us"—to YouTube.

== Themes ==
Unlike previous Burial releases, Rival Dealer maintains a significant theme throughout its three tracks. Fact critic Tom Lea called the EP a story about "love, confusion and relationships", citing the track "Come Down to Us" as a primary example. In a rare public message to BBC Radio 6 Music, Burial himself stated, "I put my heart into the new EP, I hope someone likes it. I wanted the tunes to be anti-bullying tunes that could maybe help someone to believe in themselves, to not be afraid, and to not give up, and to know that someone out there cares and is looking out for them. So it's like an angel's spell to protect them against the unkind people, the dark times, and the self-doubts."

All three tracks contain samples from an interview with NASA scientist Melissa Dawson Higgins. "Come Down to Us" utilizes a sample from a speech by filmmaker Lana Wachowski at the 2012 Human Rights Campaign gala, as well as a sample from the 1982 film Liquid Sky.

== Critical reception ==
Professional ratings
Aggregate scores
Source	Rating
AnyDecentMusic?	8.1/10
Metacritic	83/100
Review scores
Source	Rating
AllMusic	4/5 stars
Consequence of Sound	4/5 stars
Cuepoint (Expert Witness)	A
DIY	4/5 stars
NME	9/10
Pitchfork	9.0/10
Resident Advisor	4.0/5
Rolling Stone	3.5/5 stars
Slant Magazine	4/5 stars
XLR8R	9/10

Upon its release, Rival Dealer received critical acclaim. At Metacritic, which assigns a normalised rating out of 100 to reviews from mainstream critics, the album holds an average score of 83, indicating "universal acclaim". Pitchfork awarded it their "Best New Music" accolade, with reviewer Larry Fitzmaurice noting a "wider, more jarring and revelatory" change in Burial's sound and praising it as "unquestionably the strongest release of his since 2012's Kindred, and his most satisfying statement of purpose." Resident Advisor's Kit Macdonald felt that the release puts Burial in a "new creative sweet spot" and expands his musical diversity. Fact's Tom Lea argued that Rival Dealer would likely be considered Burial's most divisive release. Writing for Cuepoint, Robert Christgau said the EP offers him the same satisfaction as Rokku Mi Rokka (2007) by Youssou N'Dour and Into the Music (1979) by Van Morrison, and wrote in summation:

Despite the reflexively dark title it shares with the lead track, despite the glitched electronics that will always scare off my generational cohort, despite the consoling females who will just as inevitably trip cynics' corn alarms, its gestalt is intelligently humanistic and fucking uplifting well before the quiet, awkward self-acceptance speech that serves as a coda.

In a year-end list for The Barnes & Noble Review, Christgau named Rival Dealer the ninth best album of 2014.

== Track listing ==
All tracks written and produced by Burial.

No.	Title	Length
1.	"Rival Dealer"	10:45
2.	"Hiders"	4:42
3.	"Come Down to Us"	13:06
Total length:		28:33

== Charts ==
Chart (2013)	Peak position
Japanese Singles (Oricon)	140
UK Physical Singles (OCC)	37
US Heatseekers Albums (Billboard)	5
US Top Dance Albums (Billboard)	8
