= Work It Out (Karizma song) =

Single by Karizma (musician)

from the album The Deadpool EP
- Released: April 24, 2017
- Recorded: February 2016
- Genre: Electronica; House music
- Length: 4:52
- Label: Lumberjacks In Hell
- Producer(s): Karizma (musician)

"Work It Out" is a song by American DJ and Producer, Karizma (musician). It was released on April 24, 2017 by Lumberjacks In Hell as the lead single from the album The Deadpool EP.

The song immediately became a hit played by International DJs at most of the summer dance music events and festivals, is well received by dancers and in the fashion industry being, is featured in the fashion shows. It was also well received by music critics, many of whom complimented its sample of the Gospel classic “Jesus Can Work It Out", which was recorded by several artists and choirs, but the most popular version was recorded by Dr. Charles G. Hayes and the Cosmopolitan Church of Prayer Choir.

In November 2017, the song was chosen for global digital and tv campaigns for Google Chromebook. The song was highlighted as the second top Shazam’d songs from commercials for the week of November 6–12 by Clio.com showcasing the power of pairing the right tune with the right ad, ranking higher than Taylor Swift’s “Look What You Made Me Do”.

== Commercial ==
The song was chosen for global digital and tv campaigns for Google Chromebook.
