= Okzharp =

South African music producer and DJ

- Born: Cape Town, South Africa
- Origin: South Africa
- Genres: House; EDM
- Occupations: Record producer; DJ
- Instruments: Piano, keyboard, drums, vocals
- Years active: 2015–present
- Label: Hyperdub

Okzharp, is a UK-based, South Africa-born music producer and DJ.

== Early life and career ==
Alongside his previous partners in the UK-based trio, LV, he also helped produce a number of releases, including the single "Boomslang" which featured rapper Okmalumkoolkat in 2010 and was released through Hyperdub. He also produced the album "Sebenza" which also featured Okmalumkoolkat, Spoek Mathambo, The Ruffest. Other collaborators included Zaki Ibrahim, Quarta 330 and Mumdance.

For his own productions, he has frequently collaborated with performance artist and singer Manthe Ribane. In 2015, he released his debut EP, Dumela 113 featuring Manthe Ribane which was released through Hyperdub.

In early 2016, he released his second EP Gated with Samrai and in that same year, he released his third EP Tell Your Vision which featured Manthe Ribane and was released through Hyperdub. The EP was written and recorded in London over two weeks in January 2016.

In 2018, he release his debut R&B-influenced album, Closer Apart, featuring singer Manthe Ribane and was released Hyperdub. The title of the album referenced their long-distance musical relationship, with Ribane being based in South Africa and OKZharp living in Britain. Explaining his album:

Most of the music came out of headphones moments in hotel rooms, planes and airports in the brief periods of time that we spent together, mainly on tour, in Paris and later Vienna.

In 2019, he collaborated with DJ Lag on the gqom EP, Steam Rooms. The pair had formulated plans to record the album while touring together and the resulting EP was named after the clubs of Durban gave rise to the gqom sound.

He has played on BBC Radio 6 Music's guest mix. He has headlined at Afropunk Festival and has also featured at music festivals and venues such as the Glastonbury Festival and the Africa Centre Summer Festival in United Kingdom.

== Discography ==
=== Collaborative albums & EPs ===
List of collaborative albums & EPs with selected details
Title	Album details
Dumella 113 (with Manthe Ribane)	Released: 30 October 2015; Label: Hyperdub; Formats: digital download, CD
Gated EP (with Samrai)	Released: 22 April 2016; Label: Keysound Recordings; Formats: digital download, CD
Tell Your Vision (with Manthe Ribane)	Released: 28 October 2016; Label: Hyperdub; Formats: digital download, CD
Closer Apart (with Manthe Ribane)	Released: 6 July 2018; Label: Hyperdub; Formats: digital download, CD
Steam Rooms EP (with DJ Lag)	Released: 19 July 2019; Label: Hyperdub; Formats: digital download, CD
