= Where Were U in '92? =

Studio album by Zomby
- Released: 2008
- Genres: Rave; dubstep; jungle; breakbeat hardcore
- Length: 38:11
- Label: Werk Discs
- Producer: Zomby

Zomby chronology
Where Were U in '92? (2008)	Dedication (2011)

Where Were U In '92? is the debut studio album by British electronic producer Zomby, released in 2008 by Werk Discs.

== Background ==
The album's title refers to the opening line from the M.I.A. song "XR2" and is a homage to the rave scene of the early 1990s, reflected by Zomby's mixture of his usual chiptune-inflected UK garage style with the more upbeat, rave stylings of breakbeat house. Zomby used equipment from the period, such as the Akai S2000 sampler and Atari ST computer.

== Critical reception ==
Professional ratings
Review scores
Source	Rating
AllMusic	4/5 stars
Pitchfork	8.3/10
PopMatters	7/10
Resident Advisor	3.5/5

Rick Anderson of AllMusic stated, "this batch of tracks would have sounded distinctly strange at any rave of the period." Nate Patrin of Pitchfork described the album as "a history lesson, a depiction of a musical timeline that folds in on itself, and a revival that works because it approaches its subject with the idea that it simply evolved instead of died."

=== Accolades ===
Year-end lists for Where Were U in '92?
Publication	List	Rank	Ref.
Fact	20 Best Albums of 2008	3	
Pitchfork	The Top 50 Albums of 2009	47	

== Track listing ==
Where Were U in '92? track listing
No.	Title	Length
1.	"Fuck Mixing, Let's Dance"	3:00
2.	"Euphoria"	3:27
3.	"We Got the Sound"	1:57
4.	"Daft Punk Rave"	1:02
5.	"Tears in the Rain"	4:34
6.	"Get Sorted"	2:18
7.	"G.T.I."	1:26
8.	"Float"	3:19
9.	"Need Ur Lovin'"	2:24
10.	"Pillz"	4:21
11.	"Hench"	2:24
12.	"B with Me"	3:52
13.	"Where Were U in '92"	2:04
14.	"U Are My Fantasy" (Street Fighter II theme remix)	2:03
Total length:		38:11

== Personnel ==
Credits adapted from liner notes.

- Zomby
- Luke Alexander – artwork
- Polo – illustration

== Charts ==
Chart performance for Where Were U in '92?
Chart (2012)	Peak position
UK Record Store (OCC)	10
