= Nothing (Zomby EP) =

EP by Zomby
- Released: 28 November 2011
- Length: 22:13
- Label: 4AD

Zomby chronology
Dedication (2011)	Nothing (2011)	With Love (2013)

Nothing is an EP by English record producer Zomby. It was released on 28 November 2011 through 4AD. It received generally favorable reviews from critics.

== Background ==
Nothing is a follow-up to Zomby's 2011 album, Dedication. The EP contains seven tracks, clocking in at 22 minutes. It was released as a digital download and as a limited edition white vinyl, on 28 November 2011 in the United Kingdom and 6 December 2011 in the United States, through 4AD.

== Critical reception ==
Professional ratings
Aggregate scores
Source	Rating
Metacritic	69/100
Review scores
Source	Rating
Consequence	3/5 stars
The Independent	3/5 stars
Loud and Quiet	6/10
Pitchfork	7.5/10
PopMatters	6/10
Resident Advisor	3.5/5
The Skinny	3/5 stars
Tiny Mix Tapes	3.5/5 stars
XLR8R	7/10

According to the review aggregator Metacritic, Nothing received "generally favorable reviews" based on a weighted average score of 69 out of 100 from 11 critic scores.

Carlos Román of Tiny Mix Tapes stated, "In the Nothing EP, Zomby follows Dedication's trail of non-concluding songs (which actually could be mistaken merely as leftovers from that album) with suggestive titles, shady impressions, and the usual sparkling production." Pete Crigler of PopMatters called the EP "One of the most interesting dance/dubstep collections of the year, without a doubt."

Meanwhile, Andy Gill of The Independent wrote, "The rapid follow-up to this summer's evocative Dedication is markedly different in intent, a much lighter affair lacking the somewhat sombre, haunted mood of that valedictory album." Ray Philp of The Skinny commented that "Nothing is a rather perverse collector's item: a slightly underwhelming Zomby record."

== Track listing ==
Nothing track listing
No.	Title	Length
1.	"Labyrinth"	3:11
2.	"Digital Fractal"	3:38
3.	"Equinox"	3:29
4.	"Sens"	1:59
5.	"It Was All a Dream"	3:51
6.	"Trapdoor"	3:28
7.	"Ecstasy Versions"	2:40
Total length:		22:13
