= Moth / Wolf Cub =

"Moth" / "Wolf Club"

Single by Burial + Four Tet
- Released: 4 May 2009
- Genre: Electronic, dubstep, deep house, tech house
- Length: 17:55
- Label: Text (TEXT006)

Burial singles chronology
"Ghost Hardware" (2007)	"Moth" / "Wolf Cub" (2009)	""Ego" / "Mirror"" (2011)

Four Tet singles chronology
"Ringer" (2008)	"Moth" / "Wolf Cub" (2009)	"Love Cry" (2009)

Professional ratings
Review scores
Source	Rating
Pitchfork	(7/10)
PopMatters	(favourable)
Resident Advisor	3.5/5 stars

"Moth" / "Wolf Cub" is a collaborative release by the British musicians Burial and Four Tet. It was released exclusively on vinyl on 4 May 2009 by Four Tet's own Text Records imprint. The limited-run 12" vinyl had no label and was packaged in a completely black sleeve without liner notes. Neither the artists nor the record label have released any information about the single's content or production, save for the artists and track names.

This record was repressed in November 2011.

== Track listing ==
No.	Title	Length
1.	"Moth"	9:01
2.	"Wolf Cub"	8:54
Total length:		17:55
