= We Can Work It Out (disambiguation) =

"We Can Work It Out" is a song by the Beatles.

We Can Work It Out may also refer to:

== Music ==
- "We Can Work It Out" (Andreas Johnson song)
- "We Can Work It Out" (Sweetbox song)
- "We Can Work It Out", a song by S Club 7, a B-side of the 1999 single "Two in a Million"

== Literature ==
- "We Can Work It Out", a storyline in the science fiction comedy webtoon series Live with Yourself!
- We Can Work It Out: Resolving Conflicts Peacefully and Powerfully. (32 pages) ISBN 978-1892005120 by Marshall Rosenberg
