= Cooly G =

British singer, rapper, producer and DJ

Merrisa Campbell, known by her recording alias Cooly G, is a British singer, rapper, producer and DJ, living in London. She has released two albums of bass music on Hyperdub: Playin' Me (2012) and Wait 'Til Night (2014).

== Music ==
Her full-length albums "explore more complex, difficult and polarising emotional frequencies than can possibly [be] visited on her club-ready EP output."

Singles and EPs from 2008 onwards have encompassed UK funky, jungle, garage, grime, deep house and dub.

Alexis Petridis in The Guardian described her debut album Playin' Me (2012) thus: "You hear fragments of lover's rock, dubstep, Soul II Soul, drum'n'bass, UK funky and Massive Attack's stoned melancholy: the end result sounds unearthly, alternately scattered and luscious, and ultimately like no one else. Her vocals – unreconstructed south-London accent, beautifully understated style, lyrics that trace the arc of a relationship going wrong – bring it back down to earth." A review in the NME concurs that "'Playin' Me' develops the UK funky sound she's been pushing for years, with its devastating sub-bass, raindrop drums and warm vocals. Within those vocals is a pop edge, and some of her lyrics could be cut straight from the Top 40 [ . . .] But the best thing about 'Playin' Me' is that for all its futuristic swirl, it's a record about living in London in 2012." Petridis praised the inclusion of a cover of "Trouble" by Coldplay, where as the NME was critical of it.

Paul MacInnes in The Guardian described second album Wait 'Til Night (2014) as "bass-driven hip hop; and a lyrical theme, lust."

In 2010, Cooly G set up a record label, Dub Organizer, a name she had previously used for a series of CD-R releases. She played Boiler Room DJ sets in London in 2014 and 2018. She has "taught sound engineering and held music production and DJ workshops for disaffected teens."

== Personal life ==
Campbell was born in Brixton, South London.

She has two children. They lost all their belongings in a fire on 31 December 2018. Campbell had been using a temporary storage lock up in Croydon, which was destroyed in a fire, having abandoned their home after a flood and whilst waiting to move.

== Discography ==
=== Albums ===
- Playin' Me (Hyperdub, 2012)
- Wait 'Til Night (Hyperdub, 2014)

=== Singles and EPs ===
- Dub Organizer Vol 1 (BM Funky, 2008) – CD-R, EP
  - Dub Organiser Vol 1 (Dub Organizer, 2010) – digital
- Dub Organizer Vol 2 (2008) – CD-R, EP
- "Narst" / "Love Dub" (Hyperdub, 2009)
- Dub Organizer Vol 3 – EP
  - CD-R (BM Funky, 2009)
  - Digital (Dub Organizer, 2010)
- "Hyperdub 5.5" (Hyperdub, 2009) – split with Mala; includes "Weekend Fly" by Cooly G
- "Up in My Head" / "Phat Si" (Hyperdub, 2010)
- "Dis Boy" (DVA, 2010) – split with Scratcha DVA*; includes "DIS Boy" by Cooly G
- Dub Organizer Vol 4 (Dub Organizer, 2010) – digital, EP
- Dub Organizer Vol 5 (Dub Organizer, 2010) – digital, EP
- Dub Organizer Vol 6 (Dub Organizer, 2010) – digital, EP
- "Landscapes" / "It's Serious" (Hyperdub, 2011)
- Hold Me (Hyperdub, 2014) – EP
- Armz House (Hyperdub, 2015) – EP
