= Burial (Burial album) =

Studio album by Burial
- Released: 15 May 2006
- Recorded: 2001–2006
- Genres: Dubstep; UK garage; UK bass; ambient
- Length: 51:24
- Label: Hyperdub
- Producer: Burial

Burial chronology
| South London Boroughs (2005) | Burial (2006) | Distant Lights (2006) |

Burial is the debut studio album by British electronic musician Burial, released on 15 May 2006 by Kode9's Hyperdub label. Considered a landmark of the mid-2000s dubstep scene, the album's sound features a dark, emotive take on the UK rave music that preoccupied Burial in his youth, including UK garage and 2-step. Critics have variously interpreted the release as an elegy for the dissipated rave movement and a sullen audio portrait of London.

Burial received critical acclaim, with The Wire magazine naming it the record of the year in its annual critics' poll. It was also ranked the year's fifth best album by Mixmag and sixth by The Guardian. It has been ranked among the best albums of the decade by Fact and Resident Advisor, and in 2013 it was ranked number 391 on NME's "500 Greatest Albums of All Time".

== Production and composition ==
As an adolescent, William Bevan listened to drum and bass and jungle music on his way to school. When he heard the song "Special Mission" by Digital, Bevan came to the realization that he could create music without traditional musicianship. In 2006, Bevan described himself as "not a musician." Burial was produced from 2001 to 2006 using the program Sound Forge. Bevan began sending Steve Goodman (a.k.a. Kode9) letters and CD-Rs of his home-made music around 2002, having been a fan of the music featured on Goodman's Hyperdub website. In 2005, the label released the South London Boroughs EP, which collected tracks recorded by Bevan for several years prior.

As Bevan describes the recording process in an interview, "Once I change something, I can never un-change it. I can only see the waves. So I know when I’m happy with my drums because they look like a nice fishbone. When they look just skeletal as fuck in front of me, and so I know they’ll sound good." He also said that he didn't use a sequencer, because if his drums were timed too perfectly, they would "lose something" and "sound rubbish". Bevan prioritised drums while making the record, saying "I don’t find melodies catchy, I find drums catchy. When you have a bassline in your head for a day, you’re fucked. You can’t think." He also recorded himself drumming, in case he forgot a rhythmic idea; he would often get kicked out of class for drumming on tables. Bevan aimed to build a dark, melancholic atmosphere on the album.

== Music ==
Sputnikmusic review Nick Butler described Burial as "claustrophobic, nervous, and at times, scary", but also occasionally "gorgeous", like on "Forgive" which he called "heartbreakingly beautiful" yet "painfully minimal". Pitchfork critic Tim Finney noted the beats to be reminiscent of the playfulness of 2-step, except that the rhythms sound more nervous than joyful, and have a fast-running insubstantiality that brings to mind the fear and dread of dubstep. Lugubrious synths are played over these beats, which Finney said pass "over one another like successive waves of blue and purple rainclouds." He also noted this raincloud effect to be similar to techstep made by artists of Parasol Records sub-label Hidden Agenda or producer Dom & Roland in the late 1990s. Crackles of pirate radio and vinyl, as well as actual recordings of rain and fire, which Burial opined "would put most electronica producers to shame they’re so fucking heavy", are present on the album, as well as vocal samples that have been described as yearning and ghostly.

According to journalist Derek Walmsley, "a melancholy tinge runs through the album, but the constant interplay of tension and calm, and of alienation and intimacy, offers the possibility of salvation around the next corner." Simon Reynolds' review in The Observer shared a similar sentiment, "There's a simmering, suppressed violence bubbling inside Burial's music which conjures images of a city full of damaged people ready to inflict damage on others. But there's also a hovering grace and tenderness that makes me think of Wim Wenders's film Wings of Desire – a quality that emerges most clearly on 'Forgive', a beatless ache of sound threaded with the sounds of cleansing rainfall." Reynolds categorized Burial as a concept album and also said it "could almost be an audio essay about the London hardcore continuum", as it follows South London flooded New Orleans-style due to global warming. He notes this situation similar to the novel The Drowned World by J. G. Ballard, a science fiction author who is a common reference point in discussions regarding dubstep. He said that the setting of the LP is localized using titles like "South London Boroughs" and "Southern Comfort", which are two tracks where their "rippling canopies of amorphous sorrow-sound do for SE19 what Gas's Königsforst did for the woodlands near Cologne."

"Night Bus", instrumentated with a "beat-free Gorecki-like waft of mournful strings", represents the sadness of when Londoners, after clubbing, go through difficult public transport options because they're unable to afford cabs back to Zones three, four, five or six, low-rent areas where they reside. This gloom is offset by the romance and greatness of the city as seen from a top deck, "neon twinkling like a recumbent Milky Way." According to Reynolds, the album also regards the "keep-the-faith conservatism" in dubstep which Mark Fisher argued was a requiem or funeral tribute for the culture of rave, an example being "Gutted", which includes a faltering yet stoic low-key male vocal sample declaring, "me and him, we're from different, ancient tribes ... now we're both almost extinct ... sometimes ... you gotta stick with the ancients ... old school ways."

== Release and artwork ==
Burial was released on the Hyperdub label in May 2006. Bevan did not expect the album to reach wide attention. He said he was "buzzing, totally buzzing. But I had to hide that feeling, I didn't really have anyone to tell, apart from my brothers and my family – but that was all that mattered to me." The album artwork is by Burial, and includes an aerial view of South London around the area of Wandsworth Prison and the intersection of Trinity Road and Windmill Road; "That’s what I wanted. Epic… distant lights. I love this film called Nil By Mouth by Gary Oldman because it’s the only film I’ve ever seen anyone get London properly in it, which is just distant lights, down the end of your road. That vibe, but then sometimes I don’t love it."

== Critical reception ==
Professional ratings
Review scores
| Source | Rating |
|---|---|
| AllMusic | 4/5 stars |
| Christgau's Consumer Guide | (1-star Honorable Mention) |
| Collective | 4/5 |
| The Guardian | 5/5 stars |
| The Observer | 4/5 stars |
| Pitchfork | 8.0/10 |
| Q | 4/5 stars |
| Resident Advisor | 4.5/5 |
| Stylus Magazine | B+ |
| Tiny Mix Tapes | 5/5 |

Burial was met with critical acclaim upon release. In a five-star review, The Guardian's Dorian Lynskey wrote that listeners would not "need to know a thing about London's dubstep scene to find this cryptic debut the most mesmerising electronic album of the year". Simon Reynolds of The Guardian's sister paper, The Observer, highlighted the nervous sadness of the record that he thought would hurt and heal every listener. Simon Pitchforth of Resident Advisor called it one of the year's best albums and "a classic of sustained urban atmospherics." AllMusic journalist Jason Birchmeier labeled Burial as the "first great dubstep album", writing that while other dubstep producers have built a dark and emotive style similar to Burial's, he was the first to do it on a full-length LP so effectively.

Sputnikmusic staff reviewer Nick Butler described Burial as "an experience that's probably quite unlike anything you've ever had" and felt that the album, while not the year's best, "was definitely top 10." Todd Burns of Stylus Magazine called it an "occasionally great and always thrilling album", even out of the dubstep scene. Tim Finney of Pitchfork felt that the album's ability to spin familiar music samples "into webs of torturous beauty" makes it a compelling listen, but also described it as "a brilliant EP padded out with sketches and noble failures", criticizing its inconsistency. In a less enthusiastic review, Robert Christgau gave it as a one-star honorable mention rating, writing that "Maybe [Burial] figured get your beats working first and later for humanism--or maybe he still had a ways to go in the humanity department", while citing "Southern Comfort" and "Broken Home" as highlights.

== Accolades ==
Burial appeared on numerous year-end lists in 2006, including being named "Record of the Year" by The Wire magazine in its annual critics' poll. It was ranked number 25 on Resident Advisor's list of the best albums of the 2000s, calling it "a revolutionary record in the way that it influenced dubstep sounds and reinvented 2-step for an entirely different generation", while on Fact's list of the top records of that decade, it was number 22. In another decade-end list from 2015, it got the eighth spot of Complex's "Best Self-Titled Albums of the Last Decade". As of 23 October 2013, it is number 391 on NME's "500 Greatest Albums of All Time".

Year-end
| Publication | Rank | Ref |
|---|---|---|
| Collective | * | |
| The Guardian | 6 | |
| Idolator | 49 | |
| Mixmag | 5 | |
| The Observer | 18 | |
| Playlouder | 21 | |
| Q | 77 | |
| Stylus Magazine | 41 | |
| Uncut | 20 | |
| The Wire | 1 | |
Decade-end
| Complex | 8 | |
| Fact | 22 | |
| Resident Advisor | 25 | |
All-time
| The Guardian (2007) | * | |
| NME (2013) | 391 | |
2004–2009
| Clash | 24 | |
"*" indicates an unordered list.

== Track listing ==
All tracks written and produced by Burial. "Spaceape" is co-written by The Spaceape. (Note: The Spaceape's lyrics on "Spaceape" are almost identical to his lyrics on "Victims" from Memories of the Future with Kode9.)

| No. | Title | Length |
|---|---|---|
| 1. | Untitled | 0:36 |
| 2. | "Distant Lights" | 5:26 |
| 3. | "Spaceape" (featuring The Spaceape) | 3:59 |
| 4. | "Wounder" | 4:51 |
| 5. | "Night Bus" | 2:13 |
| 6. | "Southern Comfort" | 5:01 |
| 7. | "U Hurt Me" | 5:22 |
| 8. | "Gutted" | 4:43 |
| 9. | "Forgive" | 3:07 |
| 10. | "Broken Home" | 5:04 |
| 11. | "Prayer" | 3:45 |
| 12. | "Pirates" | 6:06 |
| 13. | Untitled | 0:54 |
| Total length: | | 51:07 |

Samples

- "Untitled" contains a sample of Benicio del Toro's dialogue from the film 21 Grams (2003).
- "Distant Lights" contains a vocal sample from "Emotion" by Destiny's Child.
- "Night Bus" contains a vocal sample from "Praise Ye Jah" by Sizzla.
- "U Hurt Me" contains a sample from "Hunger" from the Black Hawk Down soundtrack (2002), and vocal samples from "Foolish" by Ashanti and "Represent" by Nas.
- "Gutted" contains a sample of Forest Whitaker's dialogue from the film Ghost Dog: The Way of the Samurai (1999), and a vocal sample from "My One And Only Love" by Bitty McLean.
- "Forgive" contains a sample from "The End" from the Man on Fire soundtrack (2004).
- "Broken Home" contains a vocal sample from "Dry Cry" by Sizzla.
- "Prayer" contains a drum loop sample from "Sometimes I Cry" by Les McCann.
- "Pirates" contains a sample of Sean Penn's dialogue from the film 21 Grams (2003).
- "Untitled" contains a sample of Will Patton's dialogue from the film The Mothman Prophecies (2002).
