= Subtemple / Beachfires =

EP by Burial
- Released: 19 May 2017
- Genre: Ambient
- Length: 17:17
- Label: Hyperdub
- Producer: Burial

Burial chronology
Young Death / Nightmarket (2016)	Subtemple / Beachfires (2017)	Pre Dawn / Indoors (2017)

Subtemple / Beachfires is the ninth extended play of English electronic musician William Emmanuel Bevan, known by his stage name as Burial. It was released on 19 May 2017 by the label Hyperdub. It is an ambient record that only includes the quiet synthesizers and ghostly vocal samples of Burial's sound and does not include any percussion. Responses from professional music journalists were generally mixed to positive.

== Composition ==
Subtemple / Beachfires is devoid of percussion and only depicts the atmospheric parts of Burial's signature sound, such as quiet synthesizers and haunting vocal samples. Critic Luke Pearson analyzed that the EP, while maintaining the "menacing" vibe of Burial's past works, uses less "urban" sound textures than what is normally in a Burial track. Philip Sherburne labeled the tracks as "musical descriptions of white-out conditions—far northern reaches lashed by chilly winds, where compasses fail and visibility lingers near zero," given that none of the sounds follow a clear rhythm.

"Subtemple" is a track where, as Ray Philp of Resident Advisor analyzed, "many details emerge, but few say much." He wrote that it consists of several field recording sounds such as footsteps, clock ticks, breathing, and water surrounded by crackle noises, with claps and a "tentative toy melody" occasionally coming into the mix. The sounds overlay via echo to make a "internal rhythm," Pearson wrote. A person saying "all that's left is the procedure" and a stopwatch bleep sound is heard later in the track's length. Sherburne analyzed the track heavily includes sounds that "suggest" actual objects, such as clicks indicating a fishing rod, a rumble suggesting an ocean from far away, and a chime indicating a pinging sound from a car.

"Beachfires" is the more melodic track on Subtemple / Beachfires, its only bits of melodies coming from what Sherburne described as "doleful synthesizer tones that circle slowly round and round." Person wrote that "Beachfires" has an "especially haunting atmosphere, featuring what sounds like the ominous chants of a male choir issuing from the primal depths — like [the listener is] secretly witnessing an ancient rite [he has] no business being privy too." Philp, analogizing the track as Burial "lost" in worshipping voids, wrote that the voices "glide in various pitches, from angelic registers to wails that resemble Gregorian chants." In addition to voices, there are chime textures that indicate subtle mutations in the track's tone as well as wind and thunder sound effects.

== Critical reception ==
Professional ratings
Review scores
Source	Rating
Exclaim!	7/10
Pretty Much Amazing	C
Resident Advisor	3.2/5

Pearson wrote that "no one sounds quite like [Burial], and [Subtemple / Beachfires] is no exception." However, he recommended that only Burial fans who enjoy the producer's sound design and atmosphere should buy the EP, and people that are new to his work or are only into his beat-based material should listen to a different record by the musician. Philp opined that "Beachfires" was a better track on the EP due to its "emotional potency." Sherburne enjoyed the EP because, "like a scene filmed in near darkness, the music gives us just enough detail to let the imagination run wild," while Noisey called it "terrifying and brilliant." A mixed review came from Landon MacDonald of Pretty Much Amazing, who criticized the EP for being less like Burial's signature sound that defined him on many of his past records: "As Burial continues to explore the outer reaches of ambient dub, he is just sailing endless gray swamps. Is it relatively unexplored territory? Sure. But maybe it's unexplored for a reason."

== Track listing ==
All tracks written and produced by Burial.

No.	Title	Length
1.	"Subtemple"	7:23
2.	"Beachfires"	9:54
Total length:		17:17

== Release history ==
Region	Date	Format(s)	Label
Worldwide	19 May 2017	Digital download	Hyperdub
Worldwide	26 May 2017	Vinyl	Hyperdub
