= Street Halo =

EP by Burial
- Released: 28 March 2011
- Genres: Downtempo; dubstep; 2-step garage
- Length: 20:43
- Label: Hyperdub
- Producer: Burial

Burial chronology
Ghost Hardware (2007)	Street Halo (2011)	Street Halo / Kindred (2012)

Street Halo is the fourth extended play by British electronic music producer Burial. It was released on 28 March 2011 by Hyperdub, who announced the release five days prior. The EP serves as Burial's first solo release since his second studio album Untrue (2007).

Street Halo was met with positive reviews from music critics, who noted its refinement of the musical style established by Burial's previous work. Hyperdub later re-issued Street Halo and Burial's follow-up EP Kindred as a single compilation on 11 February 2012 in Japan and select worldwide markets. The re-release, Street Halo / Kindred, placed on the Ultratop 50 albums chart.

== Composition ==
Musically, Street Halo retains major elements of Burial's established trademark sound, including the use of R&B vocal samples layered over synthesizer backings and skipping drum beats.

== Release ==
On 23 March 2011, Hyperdub announced that Street Halo, Burial's first release of new solo material since his second studio album Untrue (2007), would be released on 28 March. With Street Halo, Hyperdub adopted a similar release strategy to that of Burial's previous single "Ego" / "Mirror", a collaboration between musicians Thom Yorke and Four Tet which had been issued with only a week's advance notice and quickly sold out. To build up anticipation for the release of Street Halo, Hyperdub label owner and electronic musician Kode9 appeared as a guest on Benji B's BBC Radio 1 programme on 24 March, where he discussed the label and previewed tracks from the EP.

Hyperdub released Street Halo in digital download and 12-inch vinyl formats on 28 March. The label also made the EP available for purchase through their website in MP3 and WAV file formats. The following year, Hyperdub announced that Street Halo and the Burial EP Kindred would be released as a single CD on 9 April 2012 in Japan, with copies also being made available in select European and North American retailers. In the Belgian region of Flanders, Street Halo / Kindred peaked at number 186 on the Ultratop 50 albums chart for the week ending 9 June 2012.

== Critical reception ==
Professional ratings
Aggregate scores
Source	Rating
Metacritic	85/100
Review scores
Source	Rating
AllMusic	4/5 stars
MSN Music (Expert Witness)	A−
Pitchfork	8.0/10
PopMatters	8/10
Resident Advisor	4.0/5
Sputnikmusic	3.5/5

Street Halo received generally positive reviews from critics; at Metacritic, which assigns a normalised rating out of 100 to reviews from mainstream critics, the EP has received an average score of 85, based on 5 reviews. Philip Sherburne of Pitchfork praised Burial for "finding new ideas to animate his worn, mournful samples", while retaining a general sound that "has long since become familiar." Max Feldman of PopMatters described the EP's tracks as "even more compromised, even more ambiguous, than anything we've heard from Burial before." In a glowing review, Feldman wrote that with Street Halo, Burial "continues to make beautiful, relevant, completely non-partisan music that stands outside ghettoising genre divides."

Reviewing the 2012 Street Halo / Kindred reissue, MSN Music critic Robert Christgau said the two releases "cohere almost seamlessly as the album they become when you don't have to turn any plastic over." Sputnikmusic writer Deviant praised all three of the album's tracks and felt that the album's "main beauty... is marked by its somewhat foreign nature, how at times it seems so familiar and yet so utterly alien at the same time, like getting lost in the streets you call home when you view them through midnight eyes."

== Track listing ==
All tracks written and produced by Burial.

No.	Title	Length
1.	"Street Halo"	6:44
2.	"NYC"	7:38
3.	"Stolen Dog"	6:21
Total length:		20:43

== Charts ==
Chart (2011–12)	Peak position
Belgian Albums (Ultratop Flanders) Street Halo / Kindred	186
Japanese Albums (Oricon) Street Halo / Kindred	185
UK Physical Singles (OCC)	5
US Hot Singles Sales (Billboard)	6
US Dance/Electronic Singles Sales (Billboard)	2
