= Kindred (EP) =

EP by Burial
- Released: 13 February 2012
- Recorded: 2011
- Genre: Future garage; dubstep; 2-step garage
- Length: 30:45
- Label: Hyperdub
- Producer: Burial

Burial chronology
| Street Halo / Kindred (2012) | Kindred (2012) | Truant / Rough Sleeper (2012) |

Kindred is the fifth extended play by British electronic music producer Burial. It was first released on 13 February 2012 digitally by Hyperdub, with a vinyl release following on 12 March 2012. The EP was praised, with Metacritic assigning an averaged score of 88 out of 100 based on 17 reviews from mainstream critics. In Japan and other countries, Hyperdub issued Kindred as a compilation with Burial's previous EP Street Halo on 11 February 2012. The release, Street Halo / Kindred, placed on the Ultratop 50 albums chart.

In 2013, Neill Blomkamp's film Elysium featured the song "Loner". Terrence Malick's 2015 film Knight of Cups featured "Ashtray Wasp".

== Critical reception ==
Professional ratings
Aggregate scores
| Source | Rating |
|---|---|
| AnyDecentMusic? | 8.4/10 |
| Metacritic | 88/100 |
Review scores
| Source | Rating |
| AllMusic | 4.5/5 stars |
| Consequence of Sound | 4/5 stars |
| Exclaim! | 9/10 |
| Fact | 4/5 |
| MSN Music (Expert Witness) | A− |
| Pitchfork | 8.7/10 |
| Resident Advisor | 4.5/5 |
| Rolling Stone | 3.5/5 stars |
| Spin | 8/10 |
| XLR8R | 9/10 |

Kindred was widely acclaimed by music critics. At Metacritic, which assigns a normalized rating out of 100, based on 17 reviews, the album received a score of 88 out of 100, indicating "universal acclaim". Andrew Ryce of Pitchfork noted that Kindred "pretty much breaks every Burial precedent there is", calling it "a convenient slap in the face, a wake up call. Never before has his music possessed this much majesty, this much command, this much power: The pathos here has moved from sympathetic to completely domineering." NME's Ben Hewitt wrote that "all the highfaluting talk is justified: the EP’s title track is a 12-minute depth-charge that crackles and fizzes dangerously, imbued with the same knife-edge tension you feel when trekking across London at night." Reviewing the CD reissue compiling the EP with 2011's Street Halo, Robert Christgau wrote that Kindred's title track "takes seven seconds to achieve liminal audibility before slowly building into a peppier elegy than anything [Burial]'s previously dared", while "Ashtray Wasp" develops from a "distressed house anthem" into "something more lyrical. Thoughtful, even."

== Track listing ==
All tracks written and produced by Burial.

| No. | Title | Length |
|---|---|---|
| 1. | "Kindred" | 11:28 |
| 2. | "Loner" | 7:31 |
| 3. | "Ashtray Wasp" | 11:46 |
| Total length: | | 30:45 |

== Charts ==
| Chart (2012) | Peak position |
|---|---|
| Belgian Albums (Ultratop Flanders) Street Halo / Kindred | 186 |
| Japanese Albums (Oricon) Street Halo / Kindred | 185 |
| US Hot Singles Sales (Billboard) | 2 |
| US Dance/Electronic Singles Sales (Billboard) | 1 |
