= Karizma (musician) =

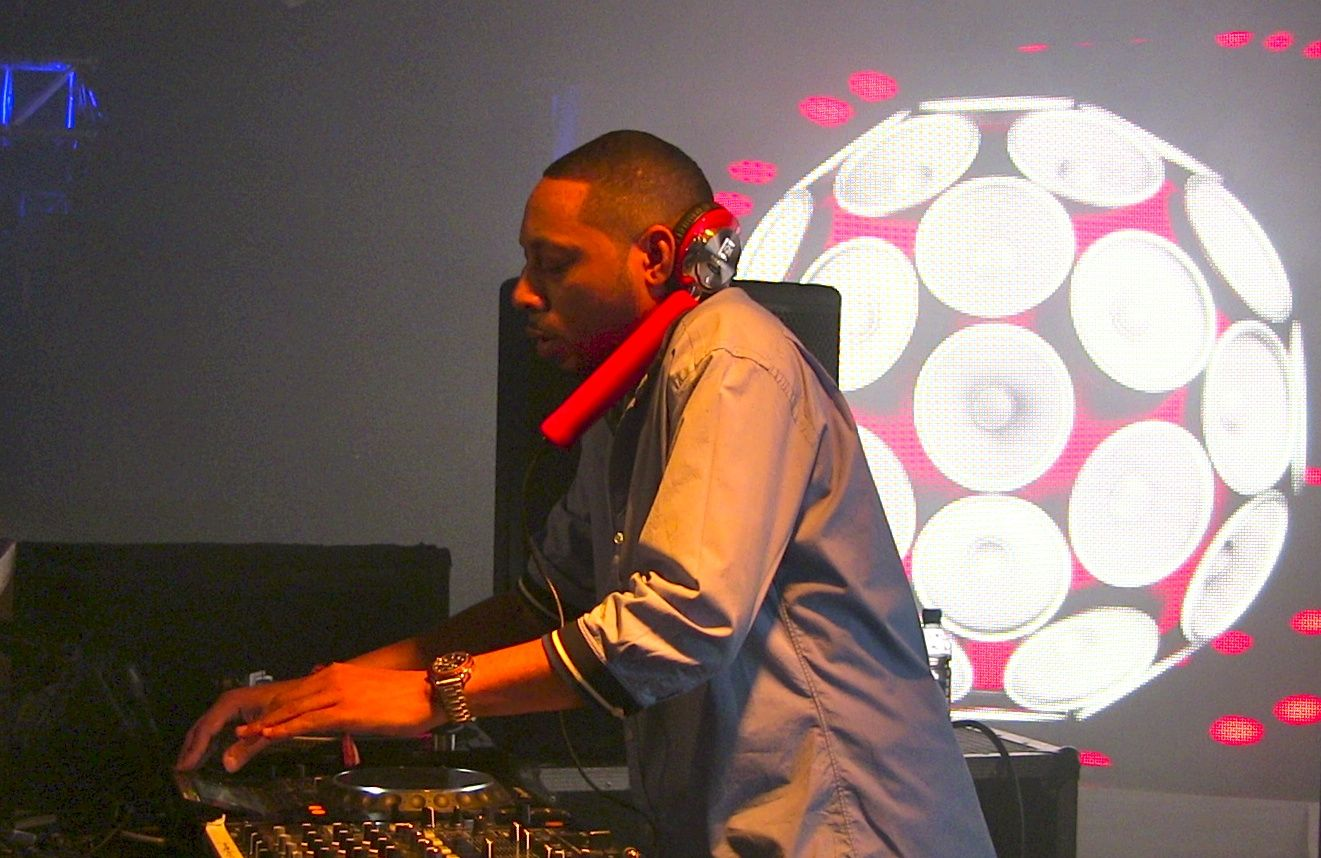

Background information
- Birth name: Cristopher Clayton
- Also known as: Kaytronik
- Origin: Maryland, Baltimore, United States
- Genres: House, hip hop, broken beat
- Occupations: DJ, record producer
- Labels: Atjazz Record Company, Back Corner, Basement Boys Records, BBE, Compost Records, Defected Records, GoGo Music, Kohesive, Nervous, Objektivity, Quantized Recordings, Raw Fusion, R2 Records, Sonar Kollectiv, Soul Heaven, Strictly Rhythm, Vega Records, Yoruba Records

Karizma (born Christopher Clayton on March 28, 1970, in Baltimore, Maryland) is an American electronic musician, DJ and record producer, known for his wide variety of music production in deep house, deep techno, hip hop, jazz, and broken beat.

== Early career ==
Karizma grew up in Baltimore, Maryland, and he began to DJ for fashion shows and college parties at age of 13.

Karizma and DJ Spen worked on a music production project with a record label, Jasper Street Company, and joined the house music production group the Basement Boys, and worked on remixes for musicians such as Mary J. Blige, Bob Sinclar, and Lenny Kravitz.

In October 1999, Karizma released his first solo work, "The Power E.P." from Black Vinyl Records, while he belong to the Basement Boys.

In 2006, Karizma distributed his unreleased track, "Twyst this" to a few contacts including Gilles Peterson. Gilles Peterson introduced it on his radio program, Worldwide on BBC Radio 1, and this track got chart in on top 14 in spite of it being on a white label record.

== Albums and solo career ==
In 2007, Karizma released a solo album, "A Mind of Its Own" on R2 Records, and made his official debut.

Karizma was voted as Best DJ's of 2007 in the XLR8R magazine.

In 2010, Karizma was nominated as the "Best Hometown Hero" on his home town, Baltimore city newspaper for his solo career progression traveling around the globe.

In 2011, he produced a mix for FACT magazine, which lauded him as "one of the world's premiere house producers for well over a decade now".

In 2012, Karizma released a triple pack LP, "Karizma Collection 1999–2012", 500 copy limited editions including his classic songs, "Twysted" and "Power", individually hand sprayed each of the album sleeves.

In 2013, Karizma's third solo album, a double pack LP/ CD (digital), "Karizma Wall of Sound" was released from R2 Records on September 2, 2013, worldwide, featuring collaborations with Osunlade (Yoruba Records), Rokaz (Neil Pierce & Ziggy Funk), and a UK star, Sean McCabe.

In 2014, Karizma has spent a few good months working on his collaboration projects with Osunlade, Atjazz and Deetron to name a few. Karizma's DJ performance as a former Basement Boys during Jasper St. Co. reunion live show during the Southport Weekender 50 and Camelot has also made fresh news in the industry.

In August 2014, Karizma entered "Hall of Fame" by Pete Tong on BBC Radio 1.

== Monikers ==
- Kohesive
- Kris Klayton
- DJ Karizma
- KaytroniK
- K2
- K-man
- Kayorcan
- Krystopher
- Karizma Ltd.

Collaboration units:

- Deepah Ones (DJ Spen)
- Izmabad (Simbad)
- Exist (Atjazz)

== Selected discography ==
=== Albums ===
- A Mind of Its Own, 2007
- A Mind of Its Own V2.0 – The Upgrade, 2009
- Wall of Sound, 2013
- Kaytronik Thee Album, 2016

=== Singles & EPs ===
- Scottie B & Karizma – Feel The Power, 1995
- Karizma – Kristical, 1996
- Sticky People / Karizma – Kong / Mamakossa, 1998
- Karizma – The Power EP, 1999
- Karizma – Shades Of "K" EP, 2000
- Karizma – Strings Emotional EP, 2004
- Karizma – Ride E.P., 2004
- Tedd Patterson Presents Blackbone / Karizma / Groove Assassins & DJ Raw –Re:Cuts Volume 4 Black Vinyl Deep, 2004
- Karizma – The Return Of The K-Man EP, 2005
- Karizma – In Tha D.ee.p, 2005
- Karizma / David Harness – Music / Say Yes, 2005
- Ferrer & Karizma Ltd. – The Cube, 2006
- Karizma – Kaytonik EP, 2006
- Karizma – The Damn Thing / Tech This Out Pt. 2, 2007
- Karizma – Groove A 'K' Ordingly, 2008
- Karizma – Necessary Maddness / Drumz Nightmare, 2009
- Karizma featuring Monique Bingham – Good Morning, 2010
- Karizma – The Power Remixes EP, 2012
- Karizma – Collection 1999–2011, 2012
- Karizma – Komplements EP, 2014
- Karizma featuring Osunlade - Hear And Now, 2014
- Karizma – Beats & Bobs vol 1 & 2, 2014
- Karizma – Beats & Bobs Vol. FR33, 2015
- Beats & Bobs Record Store Day Edition 10, 2015
- Beats & Bobs vol 5, 2015
- Beats & Bobs vol 6, 2016
- Karizma – The Power EP re-issue, 2017
- Karizma -Beats & Bobs Vol 7
- Karizma - Tech this out Re Release

=== DJ mix compilations ===
- Karizma – Coast 2 Coast, 2007
- Kenny Dope* & Karizma – Soul Heaven Presents Kenny Dope & Karizma, 2007
- Karizma / Eddie Thoneick – Strictly Miami, 2010

== Related artists/Group ==
- The Basement Boys
- Exist
