= Zomby =

British electronic musician

- Genres: Dubstep; electronic; jungle; eskibeat; future garage; wonky
- Occupation: Producer
- Years active: 2007–present
- Labels: 4AD; Big Dada; Cult; Dream Catalogue; Hyperdub; Ramp; Werkdiscs; XL
- Website: myspace.com/zombyproductions

Zomby is a British electronic musician who began releasing music in 2007. He has released music on several labels, including Hyperdub, Werk Discs, and 4AD. Zomby's influences include oldschool jungle music and Wiley's eskibeat sound.

== Biography ==
Zomby's first major release was the Zomby EP in 2008 on the Hyperdub label. This was followed in the same year by the full-length album, Where Were U in '92? — the title both a reference M.I.A.'s song "XR2" and an homage to the rave scene of the early 1990s. This was reflected by the music which was a mixture of chiptune-inflected UK garage style with the more upbeat, ravey stylings of breakbeat house. Zomby used equipment from the period to record the album, such as the Akai S2000 sampler and Atari ST computer.

In 2009, he released a subsequent collection of tracks, One Foot Ahead of the Other.

In 2011, Zomby signed to 4AD, on which he released Dedication, also in 2011. In a four-star review in The Guardian, it was described as "an album of pensive, thought-provoking sadness," drawing comparisons to pianist Keith Jarrett and 1990s techno act Spooky. Later that year, he released the Nothing EP.

In early 2012, UK producer Reark posted a loop to SoundCloud entitled "Natalia's Song" he claimed to have written in 2007 and that Zomby had plagiarised. Reark later posted a YouTube video demonstrating the track laid out in music making software Reason. Reark had already reported copyright infringement in August 2011 to both 4AD and Zomby, and 4AD responded by co-crediting Reark on the single in late 2011.

In 2013, Zomby released a double album, entitled With Love. In 2015, Zomby released Let's Jam 1 & 2 on XL Recordings.

Zomby's fourth album, Ultra, was released on the Hyperdub label in 2016. It featured collaborations with Burial, Darkstar, HKE, Banshee, and Rezzett.

In 2017, Zomby released Mercury's Rainbow, a "long-lost" album recorded around 2008 and 2009, through Modern Love.

In 2018, fellow musician Cult Days accused Zomby of sexual assault. Zomby failed to confirm nor deny the claims.

== Discography ==
=== Albums ===
- Where Were U in '92? (Werk Discs, 2008) (Cult, 2012, vinyl re-issue)
- Dedication (4AD, 2011)
- With Love (4AD, 2013)
- Ultra (Hyperdub, 2016)
- Mercury's Rainbow (Modern Love, 2017)

=== EPs ===
- Memories (self-released, 2007)
- Zomby (Hyperdub, 2008)
- One Foot Ahead of the Other (Ramp Recordings, 2009)
- Nothing (4AD, 2011)
- Let's Jam I & II (XL Recordings, 2015)
- Gasp! (Big Dada, 2017)

=== Singles ===
- "Memories (Darkstar Remix)" / "Saytar" (MG77 Recordings, 2007)
- "Liquid Dancehall" / "Strange Fruit" (Ramp Recordings, 2008)
- "Mu5h" / "Spliff Dub (Rustie Remix)" (Hyperdub, 2008)
- "Rumours & Revolutions" (Brainmath, 2008)
- "Spliff Dub (Sukh Knight Remix)" / "Spliff Dub (Starkey Remix)" (self-released, 2008)
- "The Lie" (Ramp Recordings, 2008)
- "Digital Flora" (Brainmath, 2009)
- "Natalia's Song" (4AD, 2011)
- "A Devil Lay Here" / "Basquiat" (4AD, 2011)
