= Burial (musician) =

British electronic musician

Background information
- Born: William Emmanuel Bevan
- Origin: South London, England, United Kingdom
- Genres: Electronic; future garage; dubstep; 2-step; ambient; UK garage; UK bass; post-dubstep
- Occupations: Record producer; musician
- Instrument: Personal computer
- Years active: 2001–present
- Labels: Hyperdub; XL

William Emmanuel Bevan, known by his recording alias Burial, is a British electronic musician from South London. Initially anonymous, Burial became the first artist signed to Kode9's electronic label Hyperdub in 2005. He won acclaim the following year for his self-titled debut album, an influential release in the UK's dubstep scene which showcased a dark, emotive take on UK rave music styles such as UK garage and 2-step; it was named the album of the year by The Wire. Burial's second album, Untrue, was released to further critical acclaim in 2007, and recognised as a landmark work of electronic music.

In 2008, Bevan's identity was revealed by The Independent and confirmed by Hyperdub. In the following years, he went on to collaborate with artists such as Four Tet, Massive Attack, Thom Yorke, Zomby, and The Bug, in addition to releasing a series of long-form EPs such as Kindred (2012), Truant / Rough Sleeper (2012), and Rival Dealer (2013); most of these releases were later compiled on the 2019 compilation Tunes 2011–2019. He has remained reclusive, giving few interviews and avoiding public appearances. AllMusic described him as "one of the most acclaimed, influential, and enigmatic electronic musicians of the early 21st century".

== Biography ==
=== Early career: self-titled debut and Untrue ===
Bevan grew up a fan of jungle and garage, having been introduced to the UK rave scene by his older brothers. He mentioned American garage producer Todd Edwards and the UK's 2-step subgenre as favorites. In an interview with The Wire, he explained:

I was brought up on old jungle tunes and garage tunes that had lots of vocals in but me and my brothers loved intense, darker tunes too, I found something I could believe in... but sometimes I used to listen to the ones with vocals on my own and it was almost a secret thing [...] My brother might bring back these records that seemed really adult to me and I couldn’t believe I had 'em. It was like when you first saw Terminator or Alien when you're only little. I'd get a rush from it, I was hearing this other world...

Bevan began sending Steve Goodman (Kode9) letters and CD-Rs of his home-made music around 2002, having been a fan of the music featured on Goodman's Hyperdub website. In 2005, the label released the South London Boroughs EP, which collected tracks recorded by Burial for several years prior. Burial's self-titled 2006 debut album was the first full-length release on Hyperdub.

Despite early acclaim, Burial initially remained anonymous, and said in an early interview that "only five people know I make tunes". In February 2008, The Independent speculated that Burial was Bevan, an alumnus of South London's Elliott School. The school's alumni also include Kieran Hebden (Four Tet), with whom Bevan has collaborated. On 22 July 2008, it was announced Burial was a nominee for the 2008 Mercury Music Prize for his second album, Untrue. There was much Mercury Prize-related coverage in tabloid newspapers in the UK, including speculation that Burial was either Richard D. James (Aphex Twin) or Norman Cook (Fatboy Slim). On 5 August 2008, Bevan confirmed his identity, and posted a picture of himself on his Myspace page. A blog entry stated, "I'm a lowkey person and I just want to make some tunes", as well as announcing a forthcoming four-track 12″, and thanking his fans for their support up to this point.

=== Post-Untrue work ===
Rather than releasing a third album, Burial has spent the years since Untrue releasing increasingly longer and more experimental individual tracks. This began with "Moth" / "Wolf Cub", a collaboration with Four Tet, and Burial's own track "Fostercare" and EP Street Halo. He developed this practice, experimenting with multi-part suites rather than conventional songs on a Massive Attack collaboration, "Four Walls" / "Paradise Circus", and subsequent solo EPs Kindred (2012), Truant / Rough Sleeper (2012) and Rival Dealer (2013). Each of these EPs was met with critical acclaim, with Kindred being singled out in particular as a landmark release. Three further shorter records were released in the following years; "Temple Sleeper" was released on Keysound Recordings in 2015, an EP titled Young Death / Nightmarket came out in November 2016, and Subtemple / Beachfires followed in May 2017.

In 2018, Burial worked with Kode9 to compile Fabriclive 100, the final instalment of the long-running Fabriclive mix CD series. He collaborated with The Bug on two EPs, 2018's Fog / Shrine and 2019's Dive / Rain, released under the names "Flame 1" and "Flame 2", respectively. A compilation of Burial's solo EP and single releases, Tunes 2011–2019, was released on Hyperdub at the end of 2019.

Burial, Four Tet, and Thom Yorke released two new collaborative songs, "Her Revolution" and "His Rope", in December 2020, followed by a Burial-only release, "Chemz". The following April, Burial and Blackdown released a split EP, Shock Power of Love, and a month later the previous year's single, "Chemz", was given a physical release alongside the track "Dolphinz". The Antidawn EP was released in January 2022, followed by the Streetlands EP in October of the same year. In July 2023, Burial released the single "Unknown Summer", alongside Kode9's single "Infirmary".

In February 2024, Burial released the EP "Dreamfear / Boy Sent From Above" on XL Recordings. Later that year in June, Burial and Kode9 released another split single, consisting of Burial's "Phoneglow" and Kode9's "Eyes Go Blank". In July 2024, it was reported that Burial had composed the scores for Andrea Arnold's film, Bird (2024), and Harmony Korine's film, Baby Invasion (2024).

On 31 July 2025, Burial released an EP titled "Comafields / Imaginary Festival" on Hyperdub.

== Style and composition ==
AllMusic described Burial's recordings as "gloomy, dystopian soundscapes" which blend "fractured breakbeats with mysterious, pitch-shifted voices and loads of vinyl crackle, rainfall, and submerged video game sound effects". His work is inspired by British dance music such as garage, jungle, and hardcore, while his first album was one of the first prominent dubstep albums. He was associated with the mid-2000s hauntology trend, in which British artists explored elements of "spectral" cultural memory.

Bevan claims to compose his music in Sound Forge, a digital audio editor, and to eschew the use of trackers and sequencers. As he describes in an interview, "Once I change something, I can never un-change it. I can only see the waves. So I know when I’m happy with my drums because they look like a nice fishbone. When they look just skeletal as fuck in front of me, and so I know they’ll sound good." He also said that he didn't use a sequencer, because if his drums were timed too perfectly, they would "lose something" and "sound rubbish". Discussing his rhythmic affinities in an interview with Mark Fisher, Burial explained:

Something happens when I hear the subs, the rolling drums and vocals together. To me it’s like a pure UK style of music, and I wanted to make tunes based on what UK underground hardcore tunes mean to me, and I want a dose of real life in there too, something people can relate to.

Of his production techniques, journalist Derek Walmsley wrote in The Wire:

"Ghost Hardware"
An excerpt from "Ghost Hardware", demonstrating Burial's use of crackle, shuffle, and manipulated vocal samples

Burial decided at the outset to avoid at all costs the rigid, mechanistic path that eventually brought drum 'n' bass to a standstill. To this end, his percussion patterns are intuitively arranged on the screen rather than rigidly quantized, creating minute hesitations and slippages in the rhythm. His snares and hi-hats are covered in fuzz and phaser, like cobwebs on forgotten instruments, and the mix is rough and ready rather than endlessly polished. Perhaps most importantly, his basslines sound like nothing else on Earth. Distorted and heavy, yet also warm and earthy, they resemble the balmy gust of air that precedes an underground train.

Burial's music features heavily in the work of documentary filmmaker Adam Curtis. Curtis places Bevan's emotionally saturated sound within the context of a possible cultural revival of the spirit of Romanticism. Discussing the song "Come Down to Us", used as a motif in Bitter Lake, during an interview with music and pop culture magazine Dazed, Curtis lionises the song as a work of "genius" going on to explain:

It really sums up our time... That song is saying, it's really frightening to jump off the edge into the darkness. Both when you fall in love with someone, and when you want to change the world. And it depends whether you can live with the fear or whether you really want the thrill of it. Or whether you retreat into the world you're happy with. And I think that's why it's a work of genius. He's got it, it's the mood of our time that we're waiting for. He's way ahead of our time, an epic emotional artist.

== Discography ==
=== Studio albums ===
- Burial (2006)
- Untrue (2007)

=== Compilation albums ===
- Tunes 2011–2019 (2019)

=== EPs ===
- South London Boroughs (2005)
- Distant Lights (2006)
- Ghost Hardware (2007)
- Street Halo (2011)
- Kindred (2012)
- Truant / Rough Sleeper (2012)
- Rival Dealer (2013)
- Young Death / Nightmarket (2016)
- Subtemple / Beachfires (2017)
- Fog / Shrine (with The Bug as Flame 1) (2018)
- Claustro / State Forest (2019)
- Dive / Rain (with The Bug as Flame 2) (2019)
- Shock Power of Love (with Blackdown) (2021)
- Chemz / Dolphinz (2021)
- Antidawn (2022)
- Streetlands (2022)
- Unknown Summer (2023)
- Dreamfear / Boy Sent From Above (2024)
- Phoneglow (2024)
- Comafields / Imaginary Festival (2025)

=== Soundtracks ===
- Bird (2024)
- Baby Invasion (2024)

== See also ==
- List of ambient music artists
