= Future garage =

Genre of electronic music

- Stylistic origins: UK garage; 2-step garage; breakbeat; IDM; ambient; chillout; trip hop; grime; dubstep; techno; house
- Cultural origins: Mid-2000s in the United Kingdom
- Typical instruments: Computer; digital audio workstation; synthesizer; sampler; effects processor; vocals; audio editor

Future garage is a genre of electronic music that incorporates a variety of influences from UK garage and softer elements from 2-step garage, leading to an off-kilter rhythmic style. Characteristic sounds are pitched vocal chops, warm filtered reese basses, dark atmospheres (including synth pads, field recordings and other atmospheric sounds) and vinyl crackle. The tempo usually ranges from 130 to 140 bpm, but can also be slower or faster.

== Details ==
Future garage incorporates a variety of influences from UK garage and softer elements from 2-step garage. The genre has been described as being influenced by UK garage, dark swing, 2-step garage and grime, producing so-called "futuristic", and often very off kilter modern rhythmic production styles. The name was coined by Whistla before the appearance of Future Garage Forum in November 2009.

In Issue 108 of MusicTech Magazine from March 2013, it was suggested that future garage should employ re-pitched vocals, soft leads with a round attack or an acoustic lead, subbass or a square wave bass with a modulating filter, and a four-to-the-floor or 2-step garage drum beat with off-the-grid hi-hats. The distinct swing in future garage drum beats is the focus on "late" or humanized hi-hats between the kick and snare patterns.
