= Hyperdub =

British electronic music record label

- Founded: 1999 (webzine); 2004 (label)
- Founder: Kode9
- Genre: Electronic, UK bass, dubstep
- Country of origin: England, United Kingdom
- Location: London
- Official website: www.hyperdub.net

Hyperdub is a British electronic music record label and former webzine based in London, founded by Steve Goodman, a.k.a. Kode9. The label was formed in 2004, and grew out of the UK's early dubstep scene. Artists signed to the label have included Burial, Cooly G, Dean Blunt, DJ Rashad, DVA, Fatima Al Qadiri, Ikonika, Jessy Lanza, Klein, Laurel Halo and Zomby.

RBMA called Hyperdub "one of the UK's most celebrated underground labels."

== History ==
Kode9 initially founded Hyperdub as a webzine in 1999, which blended a focus on forward-thinking UK dance music with theoretical writing. The label was founded in 2004; its first release was "Sine of the Dub", a collaboration between Kode9 and The Spaceape. Subsequent releases established the label as an influential label within the UK's early dubstep scene, including Burial's self-titled debut album, which The Wire magazine named their number one album of 2006.

The label would then become associated with styles such as UK funky and Chicago footwork through its signing of artists like Cooly G and DJ Rashad. More recently, the label has signed diverse artists working across electronic music, including Laurel Halo, Fatima Al Qadiri, Jessy Lanza, and Klein.

== Artists ==
- Angel-Ho
- The Bug (Kevin Martin)
- Babyfather (a.k.a. Dean Blunt, DJ Escrow and co.)
- Burial
- Cooly G
- Darkstar
- Dean Blunt
- DJ Rashad
- doon kanda
- Fhloston Paradigm
- Fatima Al Qadiri
- Flowdan
- Foodman
- Hype Williams (a.k.a. Dean Blunt, Inga Copeland and co.)
- Ikonika
- Ill Blu
- Inga Copeland
- Jessy Lanza
- Joker
- Kode9
- King Midas Sound (Kevin Martin)
- Klein
- Laurel Halo
- Loraine James
- Mark Pritchard
- Martyn
- Mica Levi
- Okzharp and Manthe Ribane
- Nazar
- Pressure
- Proc Fiskal
- Samiyam
- Scratcha DVA
- Spaceape
- Terror Danjah
- Zomby

== See also ==
- List of record labels
