= Semibreve (festival) =

Electronic music and digital art festival in Braga, Portugal

- The Theatro Circo, the festival's main venue
- Genre: Exploratory electronic music, digital art
- Date: Late October
- Frequency: Annual
- Venue: Theatro Circo, gnration and other venues
- Location: Braga
- Country: Portugal
- Years active: 2011–present
- Inaugurated: 2011
- Founders: AUAUFEIOMAU cooperative
- Programmer: Pedro Santos
- Organiser: AUAUFEIOMAU, with the support of the Municipality of Braga
- Website: festivalsemibreve.com

Semibreve is an annual festival of exploratory electronic music and digital art held in Braga, Portugal, since 2011. It is organised by the cultural cooperative AUAUFEIOMAU, which is linked to the band Mão Morta, with the support of the Municipality of Braga. The Theatro Circo is the festival's hub. The festival also uses the gnration arts centre and historic buildings around the city, including churches, a monastery and buildings of the University of Minho.

== History ==
Semibreve was founded in 2011 by four people, among them António Rafael and Miguel Pedro of Mão Morta, and Tiago Sequeira. Luís Fernandes was its artistic director, and Pedro Santos took over as programmer from the 2024 edition. The first edition took place from 11 to 13 November 2011 at the Theatro Circo, with performances by Qluster (Hans-Joachim Roedelius and Onnen Bock), Taylor Deupree and Stephan Mathieu, Jon Hopkins, Fennesz, Alva Noto, Vítor Joaquim and Murcof.

In its first three editions the festival was centred on the Theatro Circo, although in 2012 one night took place at the Centro Cultural Vila Flor in Guimarães. From 2014 it expanded to other venues, including the black box of gnration, an arts centre created as part of Braga's year as European Youth Capital in 2012. Reviewing the third edition in 2013, the Portuguese newspaper Público noted that the young festival had already gained international reach and partners. Performers that year included Raime, Helm, Philip Jeck, Rafael Toral, Forest Swords, The Haxan Cloak and Atom TM. In 2015 Semibreve joined the European network ENCAC, and by 2018 it was also part of the SHAPE platform. From 2016 it began commissioning new work.

In 2020, the festival's tenth anniversary, the COVID-19 pandemic led the organisers to postpone their planned programme. Instead they held a hybrid edition at the Tibães Monastery with no conventional concerts. It featured commissioned sound pieces by artists including Jim O'Rourke, Ana da Silva, Beatriz Ferreyra and Kara-Lis Coverdale, along with artist residencies, installations and talks, all also available online.

Later editions have staged concerts at venues such as the Sanctuary of Bom Jesus do Monte, the Congregados Basilica and the medieval hall of the University of Minho's rectorate. Recent performers include Alva Noto and Caterina Barbieri (2022), Kali Malone, Thomas Ankersmit and Tujiko Noriko (2023), Moritz von Oswald and Chris Watson (2024), and Suzanne Ciani with Actress, Rafael Toral and Emptyset (2025). The 15th edition took place in October 2025.

== Editions ==
Selected performers at each edition, as reported in festival announcements and press coverage.

Year	Dates	Main venues	Selected performers	Ref.
2011	11–13 November	Theatro Circo	Qluster, Taylor Deupree, Stephan Mathieu, Jon Hopkins, Fennesz, Alva Noto, Murcof, Vítor Joaquim	
2012	2–6 October	Theatro Circo; Centro Cultural Vila Flor, Guimarães	Pole, Vladislav Delay, Grischa Lichtenberger, Mouse on Mars, Roly Porter, Emptyset, Ben Frost, Ryoji Ikeda, Jacob Kirkegaard	
2013	15–17 November	Theatro Circo	Philip Jeck, Raime, Helm, Rafael Toral, Forest Swords, The Haxan Cloak, Atom TM, Sculpture, Janek Schaefer	
2014	10–12 October	Theatro Circo, gnration	Demdike Stare, patten, Ryoichi Kurokawa, Mark Fell, Roll the Dice, Plaid, Anna Zaradny, Pierce Warnecke, Thomas Ankersmit	
2015	30 October – 1 November	Theatro Circo, gnration, Casa Rolão	Dopplereffekt, Vessel, Hans-Joachim Roedelius, Klara Lewis, Powell, Luke Abbott, Oren Ambarchi, Peder Mannerfelt, Phill Niblock	
2016	28–30 October	Theatro Circo, gnration, Casa Rolão, Capela Imaculada	Andy Stott, Laurel Halo, Kaitlyn Aurelia Smith, Tyondai Braxton, Kara-Lis Coverdale, Christina Vantzou, Rashad Becker, Moritz von Oswald, Oliver Coates, Nídia, Paul Jebanasam, Tarik Barri	
2017	27–29 October	Theatro Circo, gnration, Capela Imaculada	GAS, Visible Cloaks, Steve Hauschildt, Lawrence English, Beatriz Ferreyra, Deathprod, Rabih Beaini, Valgeir Sigurðsson, Fis	
2018	26–28 October	Theatro Circo, gnration, Casa Rolão, University of Minho	William Basinski, Grouper, Caterina Barbieri, Sarah Davachi, Keith Fullerton Whitman, Telectu, RP Boo, DJ Stingray, Actress, Robin Fox	
2019	25–27 October	Theatro Circo, gnration, Capela Imaculada	Morton Subotnick, Suzanne Ciani, Kode9, Alessandro Cortini, Avalon Emerson, Nik Void, Rian Treanor, Deaf Center, Félicia Atkinson, Oren Ambarchi, Robert Aiki Aubrey Lowe, Scanner, Drew McDowall	
2020	24–25 October	Tibães Monastery and online	Ana da Silva, Beatriz Ferreyra, Jessica Ekomane, Jim O'Rourke, Kara-Lis Coverdale, Keith Fullerton Whitman, Tyondai Braxton, Laurel Halo, Oliver Coates, Klara Lewis	
2021	28–31 October	Bom Jesus do Monte, among others	Christina Vantzou, Laurel Halo, Oliver Coates, Nik Void, Klara Lewis, Zeena Parkins, Rabih Beaini, Rafael Toral, Flora Yin-Wong	
2022	27–30 October	Theatro Circo, gnration, Bom Jesus do Monte, Capela Imaculada, University of Minho	Alva Noto, Caterina Barbieri, KMRU, Jan Jelinek, Jana Rush, Gábor Lázár, Stephen O'Malley, Félicia Atkinson, Burnt Friedman, DJ Marfox	
2023	26–29 October	Theatro Circo, Bom Jesus do Monte	Kali Malone, Nkisi, Mumdance, Emeralds, Loraine James, Beatrice Dillon, Thomas Ankersmit, Tujiko Noriko, Kassel Jaeger, Maya Shenfeld, Eiko Ishibashi	
2024	24–27 October	Theatro Circo, gnration, Bom Jesus do Monte, Congregados Basilica, Capela Imaculada	Moritz von Oswald, Kevin Richard Martin, Nídia, Rrose, Ziúr, PYUR, Christina Vantzou, Carmen Villain, Brothers Saint Abdullah, Eomac, Chris Watson	
2025	23–26 October	Theatro Circo, gnration, Congregados Basilica, Capela Imaculada	Suzanne Ciani, Actress, Ava Rasti, aya, Emptyset, Heinali, Lucy Railton, Rafael Toral, Marta De Pascalis, Mike Paradinas	
2026	22–25 October	—	Fennesz, Azu Tiwaline, TYGAPAW, Noémi Büchi, PYUR, Tarik Barri, Qasim Naqvi, Malcolm Pardon, Sam Slater, Nuno Canavarro, Marta Salogni, Flora Yin-Wong, System Sophie, Peder Mannerfelt	

== Programming ==
The festival pairs seated concert-hall performances with a late-night dance programme at gnration. It also includes installations, workshops, lectures and screenings. Critics have highlighted its use of unusual spaces in the city; The Quietus wrote that the choice of venues does not seem to be just for the sake of novelty.

=== EDIGMA Semibreve Award ===
With the Portuguese company EDIGMA, the festival presents the EDIGMA Semibreve Award, an international prize for interactive installations combining sound and image through digital technology. In 2025 the winner received €3,500 and had their work shown at the festival. The 2022 award drew 175 applications.

== Reception ==
In 2013 Público described Semibreve as a festival that did not try to be "the biggest, the best or the most different" but had already earned its place. The Quietus has covered the festival regularly. In 2025 it highlighted the sense of community the festival had built over the years and its "unabashedly intellectual" programming.
