= Multiverse Music =

Music publisher from Bristol, England

Multiverse Music is a British music publisher directed by James Ginzburg that was founded in 2004 to showcase the work of contemporary electronic artists involved with and operating from their Bristol based studio.

Currently Multiverse's output revolves around work produced by Paul Jebanasam, Roly Porter and Emptyset. Projects have included scores for feature films such as Roly Porter's original score for "In Fear", installations such as emptyset's Tate Britain commissioned "Trawsfynydd", and the modern classical output of the Multiverse record label "Subtext" such as Paul Jebanasam's 2013 LP "Rites".

From 2004 to 2008, Multiverse was responsible for seminal releases from artists such as Pinch, 2562, Vex'd, Skream, Emptyset, Joker and Pinch's Tectonic (one of the first Dubstep labels) is now recognised as having played a significant role in the genres worldwide growth and success.

In 2009 the company acquired a new studio space in Clifton, Bristol's film and media district to serve as the main production facility for the various audio-visual and recording projects of their artists. In September 2017 Youth & Power released on Other/other, a new label that falls under the umbrella of Multiverse Music.

== Active Labels ==
- Arc Light Editions
- Subtext

== Historic Labels ==
- Tectonic
- World of Wonders
- Earwax
- Caravan
- Kapsize
- Build
- State of Joy
- Vertical Sound

== Notable published works ==
- Paul Jebanasam – Transformer's 3 Theatrical Trailer
- Roly Porter - OST: In Fear
- Pinch - Underwater Dancehall
- 2562 - Ariel / Unbalance
- Paul Jebanasam & James Fiddian – Falling Skies TV Trailer
- emptyset – demiurge
- Scientist / Various Artists – Scientist Launches Dubstep into Outer Space
- Joker – Tron
- Roly Porter – Aftertime
- James Fiddian – Cravendale "Cats with Thumbs" Ad Score

== Non-Exhaustive List of Syncs and Usages ==
2015

- The Martian, Movie Trailer - Roly Porter - “Black Flag “
- Spooks: The Greater Good, Movie Trailer - Paul Jebanasam & James Fiddian –“Tarpan”
- Hitman: Agent 47 (multiverse sound design) - Multiverse – “Debris Shudder”
- Fantastic 4, Movie Trailer - Roly Porter – “Black Flag”
- Women in Black 2 (multiverse sound design) – Multiverse – “V FX Death Valves”
- Intersteller - (multiverse sound design) – Mutliverse – “MV Loops IO transition”
- Hobbits (animal TV show) – Multiverse - “bowed corridor and bowed tank”
- Jurassic World (multiverse sound design) – Multiverse – “Piano Scrapes”
- Nike/acronym - emptyset "Trawsfynydd Nuclear Power Station and Gate 4”
- Charles Atlas, Channel 4 television in the UK as part of the experimental shorts series Random Acts - Eric Holm - "Andoya"

2014

- Mohammed, Movie Trailer - James Fiddian “Sarajevo” & “Curiocity”
- Alpha Papa, Movie Trailer - James Fiddian - “Monolith”
- Lucy - (multiverse sound design) - “MV Atmos Flux / Alien Exhale”
- Boardwalk Empire - US Television Advertisement - P. Jebanasam – “Prelude”
- Intelligence - P. Jebanasam – “Prelude”
- Captain Phillips – Movie Trailer - emptyset – “Trawsfynned”
- TNT Branding - Roly Porter – “Armour”
- Pompei - (multiverse sound design) - “EMV Atmos Alien Theramin”
- Acronym - emptyset “Plane”

2013

- Call of Duty – Ghosts - Video Game trailer - J. Ginzburg – “Wither Without”
- Oblivion - Paul Jebanasam - “Ion Source”
- Mercury Music Prize - Ginz & Joker "Purple City"
- Big Talk/Film 4's - In Fear - Feature Film - Roly Porter - Original Feature Film Score
- Interferenz (Lukas Fiegelfield) - Roly Porter Original Feature Film Score

2012

- Nurofen - Bogiestomp - 'Pull Your family Through'
- "Apples to apples : Glamorous Bigfoot” Mattel - Anton Maiovvi
- Lemsip 'Movie Set' - James Fiddian "Pacific"
- Lemsip Advertisement - James Fiddian “Little Snowflake"
- Adidas Advertisement - 30 Hz - “Innocent"
- Hyundai - Paul Jebanasam “Light"

2011

- Dior, L.Ady Advert film - Sam Simpson Ed Bayling and Sam Simpson, 'Montpelier'
- Cravendale Cats with Thumbs - Paul Jebanasam & James Fiddian
- CSI - Distance “Menace"
- CSI - Ginz & Joker "Purple City"
- Falling Skies - TV trailer, TNT - p. jebanasam “prelude"
- Original Score "Northern Bank, Re-Brand"

2010

- Northern Bank TVC (2010) - James Fiddian & Paul Jebanasam (Composition)
- MTV Slips - Liam Mclean (Joker) "Do It"
- MTV Slips - Simon Shreeve & Brett Bigden (Kryptic Minds) "768"

2009

- BBC Masterchef Series Finale - James Ginzburg "In Your Ear"
- Sony PlayStation Game Motorstorm 3 - James Ginzburg & Sam Simpson (The
- Bodysnatchers) "Club Beat Internationale"
- Lexus RX350 TVC - Paul Jebanasam & James Ginzburg "Anton's Journey" - https://www.youtube.com/watch?v=p33UOAMulNE
- Sky TV Ashes Cricket TVC - Paul Jebanasam & James Ginzburg "Anton's Journey" (Re-use)
- Microsoft Xbox Crackdown 2 - Liam Mclean & James Ginzburg (Joker & Ginz) "Purple City"
- Microsoft Xbox Crackdown 2 - Liam Mclean Joker) "Psychedelic Runway"

2008

- Channel 5 Californication (Series 2) Ad Campaign - James Ginzburg & Sam Simpson (The Bodysnatchers) "Freaky Ho"
- Sony PlayStation Motorstorm 2 - James Ginzburg & Sam Simpson (The Bodysnatchers) "Twist Up"
- Met Police Knife Crime TVC - Paul Jebanasam "Uranium"

2007

- Film4 Brick Lane Feature Film - James Ginzburg & James Fiddian (Freakeasy) "I've Been"
- BBC Top Gear - J. Flynn (Cyrus) "Indian Stomp"

2006

- ITV Fat Families TV Series Music & Titles - James Ginzburg & James Fiddian
- Universal Children of Men Feature Film - Rob Ellis & James Ginzburg "War Dub"
- Universal Children of Men Feature Film - J. Flynn (Cyrus) "Indian Stomp"

2005

- Microsoft Xbox Project Gotham City Racing 3 - James Ginzburg "No Man's Land"
- South Georgia Board of Tourism DVD (2005) - Tangenti Productions, James Ginzburg & James Fiddian (Music Composition)
- Food Standards Agency DVD (2005) - James Fiddian & James Ginzburg (Music Composition)
