= FabricLive.61 =

Compilation album by Pinch
- Released: January 16, 2012
- Genre: Electronic
- Length: 1:04:24
- Label: Fabric
- Producer: Pinch

FabricLive chronology
FabricLive.60 (2011)	FabricLive.61 (2012)	FabricLive.62 (2012)

Pinch chronology
Pinch & Shackleton (2011)	FabricLive.61 (2012)

Professional ratings
Review scores
Source	Rating
Resident Advisor	3.5/5 stars
Pitchfork	7.5/10

FabricLive.61 is a 2012 DJ mix album by Pinch. The album was released as part of the FabricLive Mix Series. The mix signalled a shift away from Pinch's earlier dubstep sound, moving towards house and techno.

== Track list ==
No.	Title	Length
1.	"Venom" (featuring Distal)	1:45
2.	"Slow Down" (featuring F)	4:59
3.	"Equalized #005B" (featuring EQD)	4:22
4.	"Love Like (Pinch Remix)" (featuring Prince Green, Henry & Louis)	4:22
5.	"Rooms Within a Room" (featuring Shackleton)	2:44
6.	"Natural Law" (featuring Deleted Scenes)	3:28
7.	"In Dreams" (featuring Quest)	4:24
8.	"Swims" (featuring Boddika, Joy Orbison)	3:11
9.	"Uncertain" (featuring Dj G)	1:27
10.	"Hessra" (featuring Loefah, Roly Porter)	0:58
11.	"Acid Reign (Pinch's Dubplate Version)" (featuring Photek)	4:09
12.	"Broken"	1:48
13.	"Double Edge (Pinch Remix)" (featuring Emika)	3:36
14.	"480 BC" (featuring Roska)	2:55
15.	"This Is It" (featuring Addison Groove)	2:42
16.	"Mach" (featuring Goth-Trad)	2:42
17.	"Blue Meanie" (featuring Distance)	2:05
18.	"Get Serious" (featuring Jakes)	1:48
19.	"A Case of the Bleeps" (featuring Jakes)	2:42
20.	"Pressure" (featuring Om Unit)	2:58
21.	"Promise a Secret" (featuring Illum Sphere)	3:33
22.	"Venom [Part 1]" (featuring Distal)	1:46
