= Emika (disambiguation) =

Emika is an English singer from Milton Keynes.

Emika may also refer to:

- Emika, Arizona
- Emika (album)

== People with the given name ==
- Emika Kamieda (上枝 恵美加, born 1994), member of Japanese idol group NMB48
- Emika Yoshida (吉田 恵美可, born 1985), Japanese javelin thrower
