= Hexed! =

Studio album by Aya
- Released: 28 March 2025
- Genre: Electronic
- Length: 33:59
- Label: Hyperdub

Aya chronology
Im Hole (2021)	Hexed! (2025)

Hexed! is the second studio album by English musician Aya Sinclair under the mononym Aya. It was released on 28 March 2025 through Hyperdub. It received universal acclaim from critics.

== Background ==
Aya Sinclair is an English musician from Huddersfield. Hexed! is her second studio album as Aya, following Im Hole (2021). It is her first record since the Lip Flip EP (2024). The album is mixed by James Ginzburg and mastered by Joker. It was released on 28 March 2025 through Hyperdub.

== Critical reception ==
Professional ratings
Aggregate scores
Source	Rating
Metacritic	91/100
Review scores
Source	Rating
Paste	8.5/10
Pitchfork	9.0/10
The Skinny	4/5 stars
Spectrum Culture	85%

According to the review aggregator Metacritic, Hexed! received "universal acclaim" based on a weighted average score of 91 out of 100 from 5 critic scores.

Claire Biddles of The Quietus commented that the album "reveals Aya as a master of sound design, functioning as both a storytelling tool and as a descriptor of emotion." Olivia Cheves of DJ Mag described the album as "an unflinching account of addiction delivered via a heady concoction of excoriating dub metal, hyper hardcore and sharp-tongued speeches."

=== Accolades ===
Year-end lists for Hexed!
Publication	List	Rank	Ref.
Clash	Albums of the Year 2025	28	
Crack	The Top 50 Albums of 2025	18	
DJ Mag	DJ Mag's Top Albums of 2025	—	
The Guardian	The 50 Best Albums of 2025	20	
Paste	The 50 Best Albums of 2025	12	
Pitchfork	The 50 Best Albums of 2025	22	
The Quietus	The Quietus Albums of the Year 2025	1	
Slant Magazine	The 50 Best Albums of 2025	47	
Stereogum	The 50 Best Albums of 2025	25	
The Wire	Releases of the Year (2025 Rewind)	1	

== Track listing ==
Hexed! track listing
No.	Title	Length
1.	"I Am the Pipe I Hit Myself With"	2:25
2.	"Off to the ESSO"	3:29
3.	"The Names of Faggot Chav Boys"	2:30
4.	"Heat Death"	3:51
5.	"Peach"	3:27
6.	"Hexed!"	4:26
7.	"Droplets"	3:44
8.	"Navel Gazer"	3:05
9.	"The Petard Is My Hoister"	3:35
10.	"Time at the Bar"	3:21
Total length:		33:59

== Personnel ==
Credits adapted from liner notes.

- Aya
- James Ginzburg – mixing
- Joker – mastering
- Eli Gromova-Gulbe – artwork
- Dee Iskrzynska – cover photography

== Charts ==
Chart performance for Hexed!
Chart (2025)	Peak position
UK Album Downloads (Official Charts)	46
