= White Hotel, Salford =

Music venue and nightclub in Greater Manchester, England

The White Hotel
- Interactive map of The White Hotel
- Former names: The Bunker (2013–2015)
- Location: Dickinson Street, Salford, England
- Coordinates: 53°29′33″N 2°15′06″W
- Type: Nightclub, music venue

Construction
- Opened: 2015

The White Hotel is an independent arts and music venue and nightclub on Dickinson Street in Salford, England. It was founded in 2015 in an industrial unit that had previously operated as a vehicle repair garage and is near HMP Manchester. It is named after D. M. Thomas' 1981 novel The White Hotel.

The venue has developed a reputation for contributing to the revitalisation of Manchester's nightlife, with its community‑driven ethos, role as a hub for experimental music, and rejection of conventional commercial practices.

== History ==
The club originated as the Fuhrer Bunker on Dickinson Street. Its name was later shortened to The Bunker, and the operation subsequently moved to Unit 1, where it adopted the name The White Hotel.

In 2018 the venue staged a word-for-word re-enactment of the funeral of Diana, Princess of Wales, including a funeral procession and a Mexican Mariachi band performing Elton John's "Candle in the Wind".

In 2023 the venue staged the theatre production Being Purple Aki, a one woman show based on Akinwale Arobieke.

Artists and musicians that are frequently associated with the venue include Afrodeutsche, Anz, Blackhaine, Iceboy Violet, Space Afrika, Rainy Miller, Austin Collings and Manchester Collective.

HEAD II is The White Hotel's subsidiary record label that was founded in 2020 and takes its name from a painting by the artist Francis Bacon. In 2021 HEAD II released Blackhaine's And Salford Falls Apart record and Rainy Miller's Desquamation (Fire.Burn.Nobody) record in 2022.

In 2021 the team behind The White Hotel opened a sister site, then named Peste, a bar, bookshop, record shop and event space in New Cross, Manchester. As of 2026, this site has been renamed three times, with each new name representing a new Season for the venue: Peste, O! Peste Destroyed, P3 Annihilation Eve and now Impiety Hour.

In May 2026, The White Hotel announced that it would permanently close in January 2027, and that a three‑day festival, The Black Lights, would be held in Blackpool, Lancashire, on 26 June 2026.
