= Im Hole =

Studio album by Aya
- Released: 22 October 2021
- Genre: Electronic
- Length: 39:15
- Label: Hyperdub

Aya chronology
Im Hole (2021)	Hexed! (2025)

Im Hole is the debut studio album by English musician Aya Sinclair under the mononym Aya. It was released on 22 October 2021 through Hyperdub.

== Background ==
Aya Sinclair is an English musician from Huddersfield. She previously released music as Loft. Im Hole is her debut studio album as Aya. The album's track "Emley Lights Us Moor" is named after the Emley Moor transmitting station. It features a guest appearance from Iceboy Violet. The album was released on 22 October 2021 through Hyperdub. She also released a hardback, clothbound book of lyrics, poems, and photographs, designed in collaboration with Oliver Van Der Lugt, who is also known as Air Max '97.

== Critical reception ==
Professional ratings
Review scores
Source	Rating
Loud and Quiet	8/10
Pitchfork	8.2/10

Oskar Jeff of Loud and Quiet wrote, "This is a sonically rich album that confirms Aya's place at the forefront of cutting edge electronic music and promises a future filled with left-turns and intrigue." Jaša Bužinel of The Quietus compared the album to Laurie Anderson's Big Science for "its distinct aura, use of mutative digital effects on the vocals, linguistic and musical deconstructions, complexity and contemporaneity."

=== Accolades ===
Year-end lists for Im Hole
Publication	List	Rank	Ref.
Crack	The Top 50 Albums of 2021	2	
DJ Mag	DJ Mag's Top Albums of 2021	—	
The Guardian	The 50 Best Albums of 2021	36	
Pitchfork	The 50 Best Albums of 2021	45	

== Track listing ==
Im Hole track listing
No.	Title	Length
1.	"Somewhere Between the 8th and 9th Floor"	3:49
2.	"What If I Should Fall Asleep and Slipp Under"	2:26
3.	"Once Wen't West"	2:28
4.	"Dis Yacky"	3:48
5.	"OoBrosThesis"	2:01
6.	"The Only Solution I Have Found Is to Simply Jump Higher"	4:36
7.	"Still I Taste the Air"	5:09
8.	"Emley Lights Us Moor" (featuring Iceboy Violet)	2:59
9.	"Tailwind"	4:25
10.	"If [redacted] Thinks He's Having This as a Remix He Can Frankly Do One"	4:23
11.	"Backsliding"	3:05
Total length:		39:15

== Personnel ==
Credits adapted from liner notes.

- Aya Sinclair – recording
- Iceboy Violet – additional vocals (on "Emley Lights Us Moor")
- James Ginzberg – mixing
- Joker – mastering
