= Space Afrika =

British electronic music duo

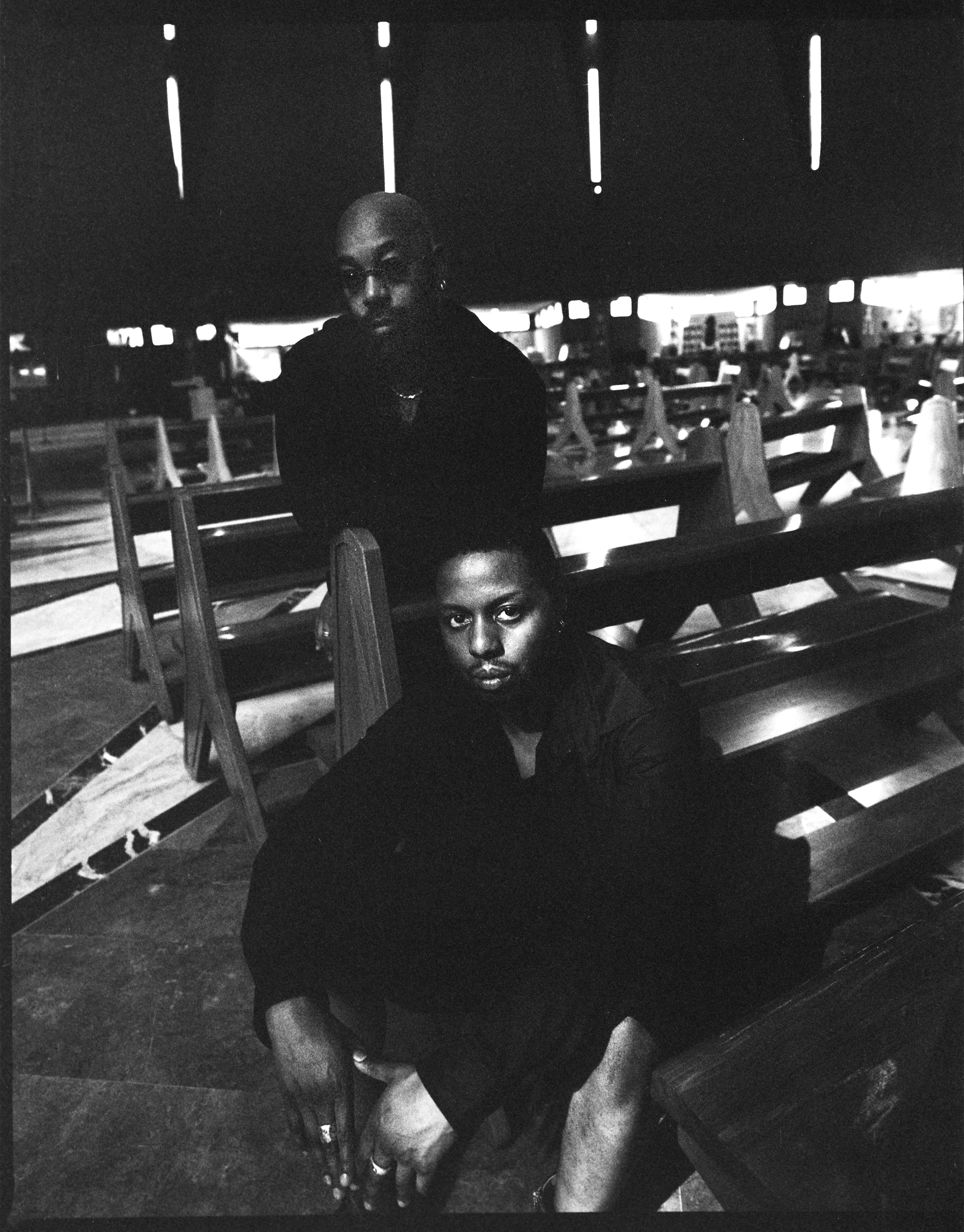
- Space Afrika in 2023; photograph by Glauco Canalis

Background information
- Genres: Ambient techno; dark ambient; experimental electronic
- Years active: 2014–present
- Label: Dais
- Members: Joshua Inyang; Joshua Tarelle Reid
- Website: Official website

Space Afrika are an ambient electronic music duo consisting of longtime friends Joshua Tarelle Reid and Joshua Inyang. Both artists are from Manchester, England.

== History ==
Reid and Inyang began releasing music in 2014. Their sound is heavily influenced by dub-techno. They released their debut album Above The Concrete/Below The Concrete in 2014. Their second album, Somewhere Decent to Live was released in 2018.

In 2020 they released hybtwibt?, a mixtape produced in the wake of the murder of George Floyd. All proceeds from this project were donated to associated groups from the BLM movement.

After the release of their third album Honest Labour (2021) on Dais Records, Space Afrika garnered critical attention. The duo were recognised to be part of a movement of Salford and Manchester-based artists in connection with The White Hotel club and seen to be spearheading a revitalised experimental music scene in the north-west region of England. Other artists of note included aya, Blackhaine, Rainy Miller, Afrodeutsche and Iceboy Violet. Honest Labour was awarded DJ Mag's Album of The Month.

In 2023 they released A Grisaille Wedding, a collaborative album with Rainy Miller featuring collaborations with artists including Mica Levi, Coby Sey and Richie Culver.

In August 2025, Space Afrika began a collaboration with the filmmaker Valentin Noujaïm to create a multidisciplinary film project, Opera Omnia. Opera Omnia will eventually be performed to a live audience at the Manchester Camerata at Manchester's Factory International.

On 9 June 2026, Space Afrika released the single "If This Is Hell", featuring Deuén, as the lead single for their fourth studio album, Quiet Storm. The album was scheduled for release on 25 September 2026 through Dais Records. The album was inspired by conceptual artist Glenn Ligon's work Figure #30 (2009) and explores themes surrounding identity, class, and diaspora. The album was described as incorporating elements of trip hop, jazz, ambient, modern classical, and techno; and features contributions from Klein, Kelly Moran, Tony Njoku, RXKNephew, Vanessa Bedoret, and Deuén.
