= Blackhaine =

English experimental musician

- Born: Tom Heyes; Preston, Lancashire, England
- Origin: Salford, Manchester, England
- Genres: Experimental; electronic; industrial; British hip-hop; performance poetry; butoh
- Occupations: Musician; rapper; choreographer; dancer

Tom Heyes, professionally known as Blackhaine, is an English experimental musician, rapper and choreographer. He is known for his choreographed dances that incorporate elements of butoh and for working with Atlanta-based rapper Playboi Carti and the Opium record label.

== Biography ==
Born in Preston and raised in nearby Chorley, Lancashire, Heyes began to explore contemporary dance in his adolescence while taking interest in experimental music, developing an abrasive style of dance that would often leave him bloodied and bruised. After starring in several music videos, Heyes subsequently began producing music, later releasing the EPs And Salford Falls Apart and Armour II.

He came to prominence as part of a burgeoning experimental music and art scene in 2021 in Salford, largely centered around the local music and arts space, The White Hotel, and alongside other artists such as Space Afrika, Rainy Miller and Aya.

Hayes played the lead role in the 2023 BBC Film / BFI short film Moon Under Water.
