= The Flute-Player =

Fiction Book

First edition

The Flute-Player (Gollancz, 1979) is a fiction book by British novelist, poet, playwright and translator Donald Michael Thomas, known as D. M. Thomas. Thomas considers the book to be one of his six strongest novels. It was Thomas's first novel to be published, though it was the second he had written.

The book tells the story of Elena, a woman in an unspecified city and unspecified country who lives through tumultuous political changes. During this time she is forced to make ends meet by working as a prostitute, dancer, artist's model and servant. According to Thomas, "This novel emerged out of fascination with Russian poets and particularly Anna Akhmatova. I wanted a generic figure, a woman who preserved the truth of the word, while chaos reigned all around her. I didn't want to individualise the characters too much, so there is very little dialogue in this novel."

The plot is told in the past tense third person except for short sections in the present tense and first person.

It won the Gollancz/Guardian Fantasy Prize.

The novel was reviewed favorably by William Gibson in a 1981 review for the fanzine Science Fiction Review:

This is an extraordinarily fine fantasy novel, winner of the "Gollancz/Picador/Guardian Fantasy Competition", that will probably be read by only a handful of American "fantasy readers". I understand that an American edition is now out, although I haven't seen it.

Elena, the protagonist, lives in a country that might be Russia, or some Kafka-esque Germany, in a city made up of equal parts of Leningrad and Berlin. Elena's story is a harrowing fable of totalitarianism's necessary war on art, a story to some extent based on the lives of Mandelstam, Pasternak, Akhmatova and Tsvetaeva. This is a tremendously moving book set in one of the chilliest and most believable hells I've run across in fiction. A story of the survival of love and poetry in the shadow of the death camps.

Sorry, no unicorns.
