= Emptyset =

English music production duo

- Origin: Bristol, England
- Genres: Experimental, electronic, minimal, drone, techno
- Years active: 2005–present
- Labels: Thrill Jockey, Subtext, Raster-Noton, Caravan, Future Days
- Members: James Ginzburg; Paul Purgas
- Website: emptyset.org.uk

Emptyset (stylized in all lowercase as emptyset) is a Bristol-based production project, formed in 2005 by James Ginzburg and Paul Purgas. Ginzburg and Purgas say that by working across performance, installation and the moving image they are examining the physical properties of sound, the legacy of analogue media reflecting upon structural/materialist art production and the perceptual boundaries between noise and music. Emptyset has produced installations for Tate Britain and the Architecture Foundation in London, and presented live performances at Arnolfini, Spike Island Artspace, Kunsthalle Zürich, Sonic Acts XIV and Club transmediale (CTM) festival.

Writing in the magazine Fact, Josh Hall stated that the duo "are preoccupied with interstitial spaces: the points at which distortion takes on its own volition; at which form begins to dictate content; at which techno yields to the equipment with which it is made."

Ginzburg and Purgas began Emptyset in 2005 to explore their shared interests in rhythmic music and bass. Both have backgrounds within Bristol's club music scene: Ginzburg runs Multiverse, a studio complex and collective of record labels that initiated (among others) Pinch's Tectonic and Subtext, which has released many of Emptyset's earlier releases. He also produces club tracks as 'Ginz'. Purgas, who now lives in London, has a history in art and sound art curation, a background in techno, and curates exploratory electronic music events under the banner 'We Can Elude Control'.

== Releases ==
=== Albums ===
- Emptyset (2009)
- Demiurge (2011)
- Recur (2013)
- Borders (2017)
- Blossoms (2019)
- Dissever (2025)

=== EPs ===
- Acuphase (2007)
- Isokon (2007)
- Doxa (2008)
- Medium (2012)
- Collapsed (2012)
- Material [live] (2013)
- Signal [live] (2015)
- Skin (2017)
- Ash (2023)

=== Singles ===
- Altogether Lost [featuring Cornelius Harris] (2011)
- Altogether Lost (SCB & Peverelist Edits) [remixes] (2011)
- Altogether Lost (The Remixes) [remixes] (2011)
- Avichi (2011)
- Demiurge Variations [remixes] (2012)
- Sepal (2020)
- Flame (2023)
- Ore (2024)

=== Compilations ===
- Trace: 2005-2009 (2012)
- Codex III (2014)

== Projects ==
- An installation presented within the central courtyard of the Victoria and Albert Museum, developed as part of the museum's programme exploring sound, performance and architecture.
- A project commissioned by Spike Island Artspace as a collaborative installation with the Turkish visual artist Cevdet Erek.
- A film developed for Tate Britain’s Performing Architecture programme, produced inside the decommissioned Trawsfynydd nuclear power station in North Wales.
- An installation, commissioned by the Architecture Foundation, that took place in a former concrete testing bunker, the Ambika P3 space beneath Baker Street in London. The project took advantage of the site's huge reverberation and its resonant frequencies to produce a dense sonic installation.
- A site-specific performance presented inside Chislehurst Caves in Kent.
- A project based around Woodchester Mansion in Gloucestershire, England.
