= Skull Disco =

UK record label

- Founded: 2005
- Founder: Sam Shackleton; Laurie Osborne
- Genre: Dubstep
- Country of origin: UK
- Location: London
- Official website: http://www.skulldisco.com/

Skull Disco was an independent dubstep record label, based in London, England. It was established in 2005 by Sam Shackleton, with Laurie "Appleblim" Osborne helping with promotion and releasing on the label, and ended in 2008. Shackleton's releases on the label prominently featured African and post-African percussion, as well as "ethnic" samples. Zeke Clough contributed distinctive artwork for the label, drawing on both Egyptology and hardcore / anarcho punk / Crass style imagery.

== History ==
In 2004, prior to the founding of the label, Ian Hicks of Mordant Music liked and released an early Shackleton track entitled "Stalker". The track later appeared on Rough Trade Records Best of 2004 compilation. Around this time, Shackleton was becoming more familiar with the dubstep sound, through regular visits to the Forward>> nights run by Ammunition Promotions at the legendary nightclub Plastic People, run by Ade Fakile known for having an incredibly clear, full and bassey soundsystem (in fact one of the first uses of Funktion 1 speakers in UK). He especially identified with the sound later associated with the DMZ nightclub, citing Loefah's Horror Show and Digital Mystikz Conference as key early influences, and started thinking about forming a label to release similar "interesting bass music" and "interesting percussive stuff".

Shackleton and Laurie 'Appleblim' Osborne went to FWD>> a lot together through a mutual friend. Around this time Shackleton had been making lo-fi dancehall bass heavy beats for his project Evil Mastermind, along with the vocalist The Great Emancipator who would later perform vocals on Shackleton records under the name Vengeance Tenfold. Inspired directly by sets at FWD>> from DJ Youngsta, Hatcha, and Digital Mystikz, Shackleton started making tracks at 140bpm. Sam was impressed with a track, Mystikal Warrior, that Appleblim had made (his first ever production) and scheduled it on the first Skull Disco release; a double A-side, with Shackleton's I Am Animal on the flipside. Shortly after, Shackleton began the (now defunct) Skull Disco nights in London. Attendees at the first Skull Disco night included Coki and Mala of Digital Mystikz.

In November 2007, with the funding of ST Holdings Distribution, Appleblim established his own label, Apple Pips. The first release was from Dutch producer Martyn, and released music from T++, Trevino, Jus Wan, Greena, Arkist, Gatekeeper, Lrusse & Bleecker, Behling & Simpson and many more.

Osborne contacted Ammunition with an idea to help promote the music on their various labels (Tempa, Road, Soulja etc.) to different journalists and DJs outside the UK Garage / D&B / London dominated scene. His work there helped coverage in magazines like The Wire, more house / techno / leftfield club DJs playing Tempa and dubstep artists, and mainstream BBC Radio 1 DJs playing the music. After progressing from warm-ups to peaktime sets at FWD>> during 2007-8, Appleblim was chosen to mix the sixth instalment of the Dubstep Allstars series on Tempa, which was released on 3 June 2008. It won No.3 in Resident Advisor's Top 20 Compilations of the year, and No.14 in their Top 50 Mixes Of 2000-2010. Later in 2008, Shackleton and Appleblim parted ways with the label Skull Disco to release a second CD compilation after ten releases with Skull Disco, a number which Appleblim said "felt right".

== Sound ==
Releases on the Skull Disco label were typically double A-sides, featuring a track apiece from Shackleton and Appleblim; however two compilations (Soundboy Punishments and Soundboy's Gravestone Gets Desecrated by Vandals) were also released.

Skull Disco releases often tended to use unusual sounds, atypical of the dubstep genre. Eschewing the familiar drum tropes of dubstep, tracks would be based on African percussion and samples of ethnic vocals, combined with massive, wobbling sub-bass, and sometimes elements of four to the floor, Basic Channel-style dub techno. Some tracks (particularly later Shackleton releases) bear a resemblance to the music of Muslimgauze . Minimal techno producer Ricardo Villalobos is a fan; he produced a nearly twenty-minute remix of Shackleton's Blood on my Hands after expressing an interest and being handed the core samples of the song at a DJ set. Shackleton has returned the favour by remixing Minimoonstar from Villalobos' Vasco EP Part 1.

According to journalist Derek Walmsley,

With their DIY-style covers, punk rock track titles and free party ethos, Skull Disco approach dubstep from an oblique angle. ... These elastic, pliable reformations of dubstep suggest that the genre has finally evolved beyond rigid formulas, reaching towards a new, organic maturity.

== Artwork ==
Typical artwork on releases (by Zeke Clough) was also of an idiosyncratic nature, the pen-and-ink covers referencing egyptological symbols as well as displaying a decidedly metal influence.

== Discography ==
- 12": A. Shackleton - "I Am Animal" / AA. Appleblim - "Mystikal Warrior" (SKULL001)
- 12": A. Shackleton - "Majestic Visions" AA. Appleblim - "Cheat I" AA2. "Girder" (SKULL002)
- EP: Soundboy's Nuts Get Ground Up Proper A. Shackleton - "Blood on my Hands" B1. Shackleton - "Naked" B2. Shackleton - "Hypno Angel" (SKULL003)
- 12": Soundboy's Bones Get Buried In The Dirt Vol 1 - A. Shackleton - "Tin Foil Sky" AA. Gatekeeper - "Tomb" (SKULL004)
- 12": Soundboy's Bones Get Buried In The Dirt Vol 2 - A. Appleblim - "Fear" AA. Shackleton - "Hamas Rule" (SKULL005)
- 12": Soundboy's Ashes Get Chopped Out And Snorted - A. Appleblim - "Vansan" AA. Shackleton - "You Bring Me Down" (SKULL006)
- 12": Shackleton - "Blood On My Hands (Ricardo Villalobos Apocalypso Now Mix)" (SKULL007)
- 2CD: Skull Disco - Soundboy Punishments (compilation album) (SKULLCD001)
- EP: Appleblim And Peverelist - Soundboy's Ashes Get Hacked Up And Spat Out In Disgust (SKULL008)
- 12" Shackleton feat Vengeance Tenford - "Death Is Not Final" / "Death is Not Final (T++ remix)" (SKULL009)
- 12" Shackleton - Soundboy's Suicide Note (SKULL010)
- CD Shackleton & Appleblim - Soundboy's Gravestone get Desecrated by Vandals (Compilation album)
