= The White Hotel =

1981 novel by D. M. Thomas

- First edition (UK)
- Author: D. M. Thomas
- Language: English
- Genre: Historical fiction
- Publisher: Gollancz
- Publication date: January 1981
- Publication place: Great Britain
- Media type: Print
- Pages: 240 pp
- ISBN: 0-575-02889-0

The White Hotel is a novel written by the British (Cornish) poet, translator and novelist D. M. Thomas. It was first published in January 1981 by Gollancz in the United Kingdom and in March 1981 by The Viking Press in the United States.

The narrative is told principally in the form of an erotic journal and letters between the female narrator and a fictionalized Sigmund Freud as well as Freud's case history analysis of the narrator.

The White Hotel won the 1981 Los Angeles Times Book Prize for Fiction, the 1981 Cheltenham Prize for Literature and was shortlisted for the same year's Booker Prize.

== Development ==
Thomas wrote some of it in Hereford, where he was living, and at New College, Oxford, where he was on a sabbatical, and used two typewriters, one in each city.

== Summary ==
Set in 1919, the book's first three movements consist of the erotic fantasies and case history of a patient of Sigmund Freud, "Anna G", an opera singer referred to him for analysis and treatment of chronic psychosomatic pains in her left breast and ovary. Freud attempts to identify some incident in her past that would explain these pains, and elicits from her a long erotic narrative – called "Don Giovanni", because she had written it on this musical score – in verse and then prose. Freud draws inferences from the incidents described and discusses these with his patient, with Anna notably deducing that her father may have been unfaithful to her mother with her mother's twin sister (Anna G's aunt). Anna is an unreliable narrator, changing key details in the account of her life she offers Freud. Only late in the treatment does she reveal that she considers herself to have second sight. Freud does not, however, consider the possibility that either her erotic journal or her pains might arise from an incident not in her past, but in her future.

Following inconclusive treatment, Frau Anna G – revealed to be Elisabeth (Lisa) Erdman of Vienna – pursues a moderately successful musical career and marries a Russian Jewish opera singer, with whom she moves to Kiev in the 1920s. When he disappears in a Communist purge, she falls upon hard times and the third movement is set in 1941, when German troops capture Kiev. Lisa and her young son are ordered, along with the city's Jews, to Babi Yar.

An other-worldly ("in Palestine or Purgatory", according to the author) epilogue ends the narrative.

== Awards and nominations ==
- 1981 Los Angeles Times Book Prize for Fiction
- 1981 Cheltenham Prize
- 1981 Booker Prize (shortlist)

== Legacy ==
A number of efforts have been made to make the novel into a film, which some have described as unfilmable or unadaptable. These have included attempts by Bernardo Bertolucci with Barbra Streisand, by David Lynch with Isabella Rossellini, by Simon Monjack with Brittany Murphy, and by Emir Kusturica with Nicole Kidman.

In 1992, London artist Maty Grunberg created a portfolio titled "Don Giovanni" (woodcuts, limited edition); text - "Don Giovanni", the opening poem of the book.

In 2016, the independent arts and music venue and nightclub the White Hotel opened in Salford, England, taking its name from the novel.

In August 2018, BBC Radio 4 broadcast an adaptation of Dennis Potter's screenplay, produced by Jon Amiel, producer of Potter's earlier The Singing Detective, with author Thomas's reminiscences about the book's publication and various film proposals. The BBC production starred Anne-Marie Duff as Lisa and Bill Paterson as Dr Probst.

The Irish Times published a piece on the book in April 2020.

== See also ==
- Babi Yar
- Babi Yar memorials
