= Dva (album) =

Album by Emika

Studio album by Emika
- Released: 10 June 2013
- Recorded: Česká Televize; Deafkid Studios; EMusik; Ljova Studio; Wilding Sounds Studio
- Genre: Electronic
- Length: 60:30
- Label: Ninja Tune
- Producer: Emika

Emika chronology
Emika (2011)	Dva (2013)	Klavírní (2015)

Singles from Dva
- 1. "Searching" Released: 12 April 2013; 2. "Centuries" Released: 28 June 2013

Professional ratings
Aggregate scores
Source	Rating
Metacritic	64/100
Review scores
Source	Rating
AllMusic	3.5/5 stars
Exclaim!	7/10
Metro	4/5 stars
musicOMH	3.5/5 stars
No Ripcord	6/10
Pitchfork	5.9/10
PopMatters	6/10
The Quietus	mixed
Resident Advisor	3/5
The Skinny	4/5 stars

Dva (stylised form: DVA) is the second studio album by English musician Emika. It was released on 10 June 2013 by Ninja Tune Records. The album's title derives from the Czech word for "two".

== Track listing ==
All tracks are written by Emika, except where noted.

No.	Title	Length
1.	"Hush Interlude" (featuring Michaela Šrůmová)	1:50
2.	"Young Minds"	3:30
3.	"She Beats"	3:57
4.	"Filters"	4:01
5.	"After the Fall"	4:47
6.	"Sing to Me"	4:12
7.	"Dem Worlds"	4:07
8.	"Primary Colours"	4:07
9.	"Sleep with My Enemies"	4:47
10.	"Wicked Game" (Chris Isaak)	3:55
11.	"Fight for Your Love"	3:49
12.	"Mouth to Mouth"	6:27
13.	"Searching"	4:08
14.	"Centuries"	3:29
15.	"Criminal Gift"	3:24

iTunes Store bonus track
No.	Title	Length
16.	"Murmer"	2:12

== Personnel ==
Credits adapted from the liner notes of Dva.

- Emika – vocals, engineering, mixing, production
- Paul Batson – arrangement ("Hush Interlude", "Dem Worlds")
- B.M. Horska – translation ("Hush Interlude")
- Michaela Šrůmová – soprano vocals ("Hush Interlude")
- The City of Prague Philharmonic Orchestra – strings ("Hush Interlude", "Dem Worlds")
- Miriam Němcová – conducting ("Hush Interlude", "Dem Worlds")
- Jan Holzner – engineering ("Hush Interlude", "Dem Worlds")
- Stáňa Vomáčková – translator ("Hush Interlude", "Dem Worlds")
- James Fitzpatrick – orchestra contractor ("Hush Interlude", "Dem Worlds")
- Tom Wilding – trumpet ("Young Minds")
- Ljova – viola, viola composition ("Primary Colours", "Mouth to Mouth")
- Christopher Lockington (Deafkid) – guitar, guitar composition ("Criminal Gift")
- Hank Shocklee – executive production
- Jo-Ann Nina – executive production management
- Hue Jah Fink – mastering
- Michael Hain – design, layout
- Madison – photography
- Simon Skevington – A&R
