= Emika =

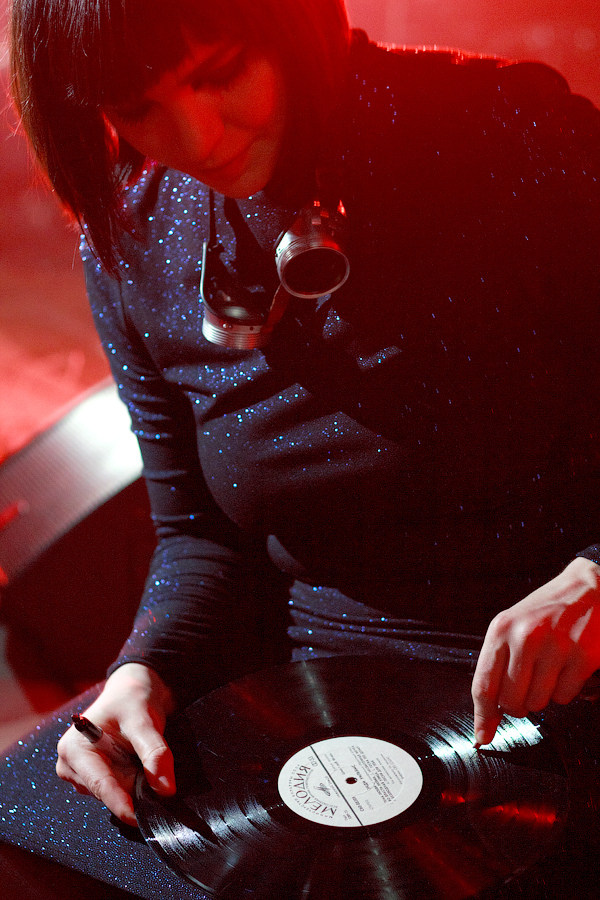
- Emika in 2011

Background information
- Born: Ema Jolly; 8 January 1986 (age 40); Milton Keynes, England
- Genres: Dubstep; trip hop; experimental; electronica; techno; synth-pop; Piano solo; Witch House; Contemporary classical music
- Occupations: Producer; Composer
- Years active: 2009–present
- Labels: Emika Records; Improvisations X Inspirations; Ninja Tune; Ostgut Ton; Tectonic; Aus
- Website: www.emikarecords.com

Ema Jolly (born 8 January 1986), better known by her stage name Emika, is an English electronic musician of Czech origin (her mother is from Příbram) currently residing in Berlin. Her self-titled debut album was released in October 2011 via Ninja Tune and received generally positive reviews.

== Biography ==
Emika, a classically trained musician who studied classical piano and composition, grew up in Milton Keynes, England. She started to make music at school (using an old sequencer program she found on a computer stashed in a cupboard) and waitressed to save up for her first Apple Mac and copy of Logic Studio. Emika received her Music Technology degree in Bath, then procured an internship at the offices of the London label Ninja Tune, where she worked for a month. As the Bristol music scene was transitioning from drum and bass to dubstep, she went to the first parties organised by Pinch.

Speaking of the reasons that made her leave Bristol, Emika explained: "I was very ill, physically, I've had to have some operations which weren't very successful and led to more, and had a long period quite surviving from morphine, really... I was in bed for many weeks. And afterwards in Bristol I became 'the ill girl'... It was very difficult for me to recover and stay in that city". In 2006, she took advantage of a free flight to anywhere in Europe granted by her bank, as she got her account upgraded, flew to Berlin on her own and decided to stay there.

In Berlin Emika began working as a sound designer for Native Instruments, while honing her own, "uniquely haunting" (AllMusic) musical style with her laptop, picking up ideas from the dance scene at the Berghain and Panoramabar clubs. Fünf, the compilation album of music crafted from field recordings made inside these clubs by Emika (who contributed her own track "Cooling Room" to the compilation), was released by Ostgut Ton, as part of the celebration of the label's five-year anniversary. Her job at Native Instruments had an important role in her artistic development, too. "I am focused on the world of sound and the power of the human voice, the instant connections it makes with listeners, in music. In general I feel there is a lack of vocabulary in the field of electronic music", Emika later explained.

=== "Drop the Other" and debut album (2010) ===
Ninja Tune appreciated Emika's new, dark, downtempo dubstep direction and in January 2010, released "Drop the Other" as her debut single, which has also found its way into the label's 20th anniversary box set. Since 2009, Emika has appeared on tracks with the likes of Pinch, Kryptic Minds, Paul Frick and MyMy. Her second single "Double Edge" came out in May 2010 to be followed by "Count Backwards" (April 2011) and "Pretend/Professional Loving", the latter came out in September 2011, and was remixed by Brandt Brauer Frick, Kyle Hall and DJ Rashad.

On 3 October (11 October, in US), 2011, her debut album Emika came out (all four singles included), described as the mix of "bewitching, atmospheric melodies and glitchy electronic beats" and getting good reviews. Emika's music has been described as being influenced by various genres like early dubstep, electronica and classical, critics compared her to PJ Harvey, The xx, Zola Jesus and Beth Gibbons.

On 18 October 2011 Emika embarked upon her first American tour, supporting Amon Tobin on his ISAM tour and she has continued to play live shows all over the world throughout 2012 in countries such as Austria, Czech Republic, France, Ireland, Norway, Switzerland, Russia and Turkey. She performed a live set in Berlin for music streaming website Boiler Room in 2012.

Despite her self-described "nerdy," studio-based background, Emika notes a major shift in her recent output evolving from the isolated nature of her self-titled debut LP to a more interactive and freewheeling piece of work in 2013's Dva.

2015 saw her two albums: piano opus Klavirni and electronic studio album DREI. Ibiza Spotlight gave both records their Album Of The Week accolade.

== Education ==
Emika studied Creative Music Technology at Bath Spa University.

== Film, advertising and other music use ==
Her music has been used in adverts by Gucci, McLaren and NBC - who used her cover of Chris Isaak's Wicked Game in an episode of The Blacklist, which led to the track reaching No. 1 on iTunes in Canada and No. 2 in the US. She has contributed to film soundtracks, including a trailer for Mission Impossible: Ghost Protocol, and her music was used at the 2012 Olympic Games in London.

Her track, "Professional Loving", was sampled by The Weeknd on his track "Professional" on his debut album Kiss Land (2013).

== Collaborations ==
Emika has collaborated with artists and producers such as Tommy Four Seven, Pinch, Nick Hoppner, Paul Frick, (Brandt Brauer Frick), Amon Tobin and Marcel Dettmann (with whom she co-produced a song for his artist album). She has recorded with the City of Prague Philharmonic Orchestra and in 2014 she revealed plans to create a full orchestral symphony.

She has been shot by photographers including Bettina Rheims and Madison.

Emika contributed a remix (along with Gazelle Twin) to the Nicholas Sutton soundtrack album Angels Dreams Inches released as a limited 12" vinyl.

== Emika Records ==
Emika launched her own label in 2014, Emika Records, initially as a platform to release her own music. The debut release was a 12" entitled Melancholia Euphoria.

== Improvisations X Inspirations ==
Emika launched a new collaborative label called Improvisations X Inspirations (also abbreviated as ImpXIns).

== Solo discography ==
=== Albums ===
- Emika (Ninja Tune, 2011)
- Dva (Ninja Tune, 2013)
- Klavírní (Emika Records, 2015)
- Drei (Emika Records, 2015)
- Melanfonie (Emika Records, 2017)
- Falling in Love with Sadness (Emika Records, 2018)
- Klavirni Temna (Emika Records, 2020)
- Chaos Star (Emika Records, 1 May 2020, download, was available for 24 hours only on Bandcamp)
- In Parallel (Emika Records, 22 January 2021)
- Haze (Emika Records, 28 May 2024)
- Vega (Emika Records, 29 November 2024)
- Frames (Emika Records, 25 July 2025)
- Fountain (Emika Records, 27 March 2026)
- Untitled (Emika Records, 18 April 2026)
- Fountain Immersive (Emika Records, 30 October 2026)

=== Mini albums ===
- Chemical Fever (14 May 2012, Ninja Tune)
- Klavírní EP (download with the album Dva, 10 June 2013, Ninja Tune)
- Drei Remixes (24 July 2015, Emika Records)
- Flashbacks (4 March 2016, Emika Records)
- Forever Never (5 August 2016, Emika Records)
- Melanfonie Momente (28 October 2016, Emika Records)
- DREI Instrumentals & A Capellas (download 22 December 2017, Emika Records)
- Falling In Love With Sadness Remixes (11 October 2019, Emika Records)

=== Singles ===
from the album Emika:

- "Drop the Other" (12", 18 January 2010, Ninja Tune)
- "Double Edge" (12", 15 May 2010, Ninja Tune)
- "Count Backwards" (12", 11 April 2011, Ninja Tune)
- "Pretend" / "Professional Loving" (12", 5 September 2011, Ninja Tune)
- "3 Hours" (12", 13 February 2012, Ninja Tune)

from the album Dva:

- "Searching" (download, 15 April 2013, Ninja Tune)
- "Centuries" (download, 1 July 2013, Ninja Tune)

from the album Drei:

- "My Heart Bleeds Melody" (promo only, April 2015)

from the album Falling in Love with Sadness:

- "Eternity (Earth version)" (download 29 March 2019, Emika Records)

others:

- "Melancholia Euphoria" (download 30 November 2014, 12" 1 December 2014, Emika Records)
- "Close" (download 11 June 2018, Emika Records)
- "Sleep in the Day" (download 1 May 2020, Improvisations X Inspirations)

== Collaborations ==
- 2009: Price Tag EP (MyMy & Emika, AUS Music)
- 2010: "2012" (Pinch & Emika, Tectonic)
- 2011: "I Mean" EP (Paul Frick feat. Emika, Doppelschall)
- 2011: "Make You Sleep" (Kryptic Minds vs. Emika, Black Box)
- 2011 : "Pretend" (Brandt Brauer Frick)
- 2016 : "Dreamt In Flesh" (Emika Remix)
- 2017: "Olive tree" by Luke Black (Emika production)
- 2018: “Tell Me What You Remember”, (The Black Dog, featuring Emika, from The Black Dog's “Black Daisy Wheel” album)
