= Pinch & Shackleton =

Studio album by Pinch & Shackleton
- Released: 16 November 2011
- Genre: Dubstep; techno
- Length: 57:08
- Label: Honest Jon's

Singles from Pinch & Shackleton
- 1. "Boracay Drift" Released: 2011

Pinch chronology
Underwater Dancehall (2007)	Pinch & Shackleton (2011)	Late Night Endless (2015)

Shackleton chronology
Three EPs (2009)	Pinch & Shackleton (2011)	Music for the Quiet Hour / The Drawbar Organ EPs (2012)

Pinch & Shackleton is a collaborative studio album by English electronic musicians Pinch & Shackleton. It was released on 16 November 2011, through Honest Jon's. It received universal acclaim from critics.

== Production ==
The album was created in Berlin and Bristol. In a 2012 interview, Pinch recalled, "A lot of synth work. There's nice analogue warmth to it. We use this thing called the Culture Vulture a fair bit – it's a pre amp with a lovely tone, really warms things up. A lot of it is synth-led, rather than sample-based, just us seeing what works, I guess."

== Critical reception ==
Professional ratings
Aggregate scores
Source	Rating
Metacritic	84/100
Review scores
Source	Rating
Beats Per Minute	83%
The Phoenix	3.5/4 stars
Pitchfork	7.3/10
Resident Advisor	4.5/5

According to the review aggregator Metacritic, Pinch & Shackleton received "universal acclaim" based on a weighted average score of 84 out of 100 from 7 critic scores.

Holly Dicker of Resident Advisor stated, "Percussive splay and mutative composition are the album's two greatest merits and maintain the momentum even in its most reductive moments like on 'Torn and Submerged' as it decomposes almost entirely into solitary drum and cymbal hits." Rory Gibb of The Quietus praised "the compositional sophistication on display here." He added, "Each track moves through several different iterations so subtly and skillfully it's easy for the transitions to pass a listener by." Michael C. Walsh of The Phoenix commented that "This release functions as a fully realized product because it sounds like neither of their previous exports, with both artists scaling back on their hard-nosed tendencies." Will Ryan of Beats Per Minute called the album "both artist's most accessible and perhaps best work."

=== Accolades ===
Year-end lists for Pinch & Shackleton
Publication	List	Rank	Ref.
The Quietus	Quietus Albums of the Year 2011	17	
Resident Advisor	Top 20 Albums of 2011	10	

== Track listing ==
Pinch & Shackleton track listing
No.	Title	Length
1.	"Cracks in the Pleasuredome"	6:29
2.	"Jellybones"	5:22
3.	"Torn and Submerged"	6:30
4.	"Rooms Within a Room"	5:21
5.	"Selfish Greedy Life"	5:28
6.	"Burning Blood"	7:11
7.	"Levitation"	6:44
8.	"Monks on the Rum" / "Boracay Drift"	14:03
Total length:		57:08

"Boracay Drift" is not included on the vinyl version.
