= Emika, Arizona =

- Populated place
- Location within the state of Arizona Emika (the United States)
- Coordinates: 32°26′00″N 112°29′12″W
- Country: United States
- State: Arizona
- County: Pima
- Elevation: 2,283 ft (696 m)
- Time zone: UTC-7 (Mountain (MST))
  - Summer (DST): UTC-7 (MST)
- Area code: 520
- FIPS code: 04-22640
- GNIS feature ID: 24406

Emika is a populated place situated in Pima County, Arizona, United States. The name comes from the O'odham language, meaning "my clearing". It has an estimated elevation of 2,283 feet (696 m) above sea level.
