= Theatre Circo =

Theatre in Braga, Portugal

- Teatro Circo
- Facade and promenande of the theatre along Avenida da Liberdade

General information
- Type: Theatre
- Location: São João do Souto, Portugal
- Coordinates: 41°32′58.91″N 8°25′21.34″W
- Opened: 25 February 1907
- Owner: Portuguese Republic

Technical details
- Material: Granite

Design and construction
- Architect: João de Moura Coutinho

Website
- http://www.theatrocirco.com

The Theatre Circo (Portuguese: Teatro Circo) is a 20th-century, Portuguese revivalist theatre, in the civil parish of São João do Souto, municipality of Braga. Designed by the architect João de Moura Coutinho, it was first inaugurated on 21 April 1915 with a performance of Ruggero Leoncavallo's operetta La reginetta delle rose (Portuguese: Rainha das Rosas).

Following a storied history that included the first talking films, operas and public performances, the building was restored by the municipal council of Braga, and reopened in 2006.

== History ==
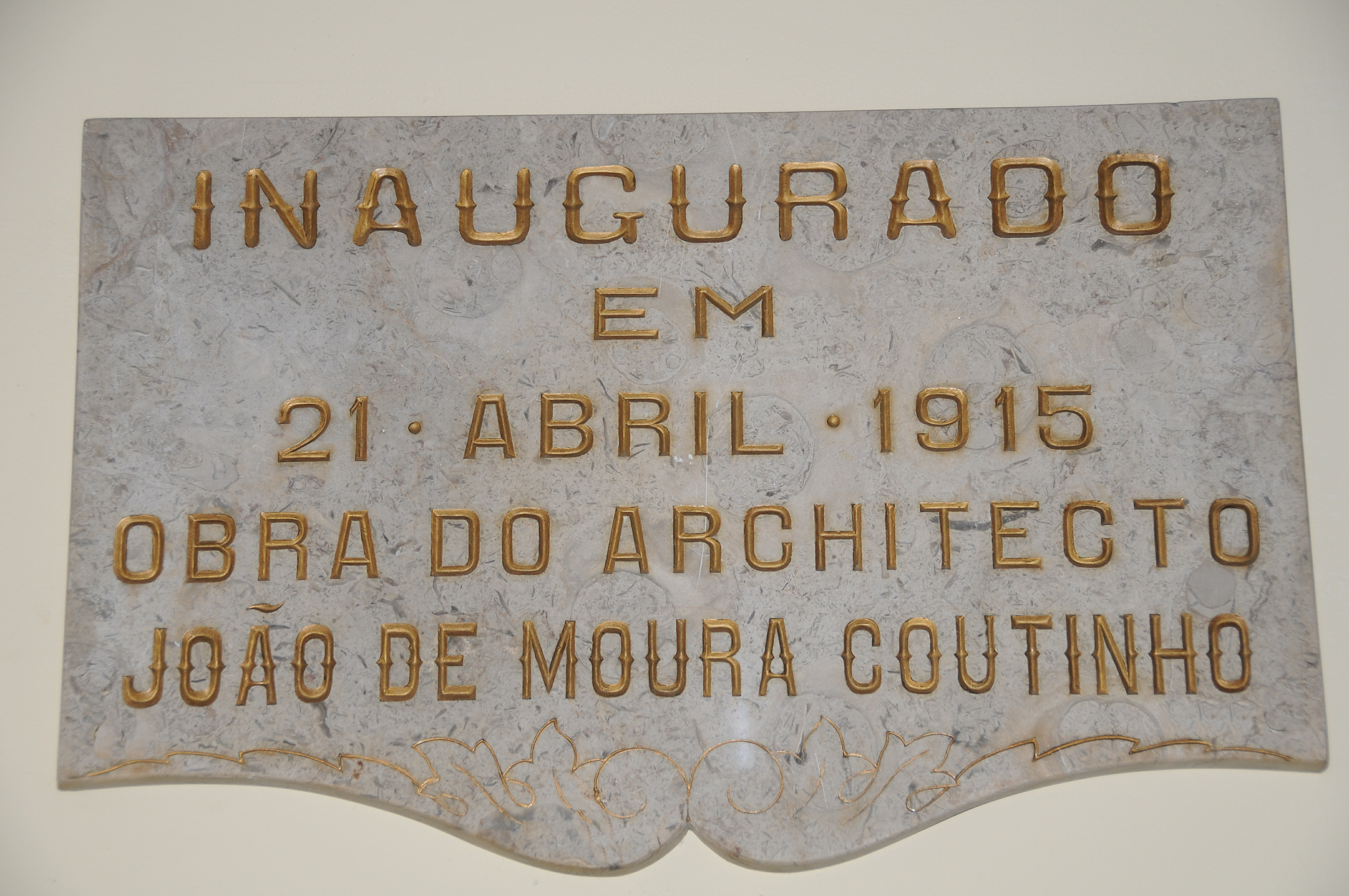
The inauguration plaque dedicated to João de Moura Coutinho, principal architect

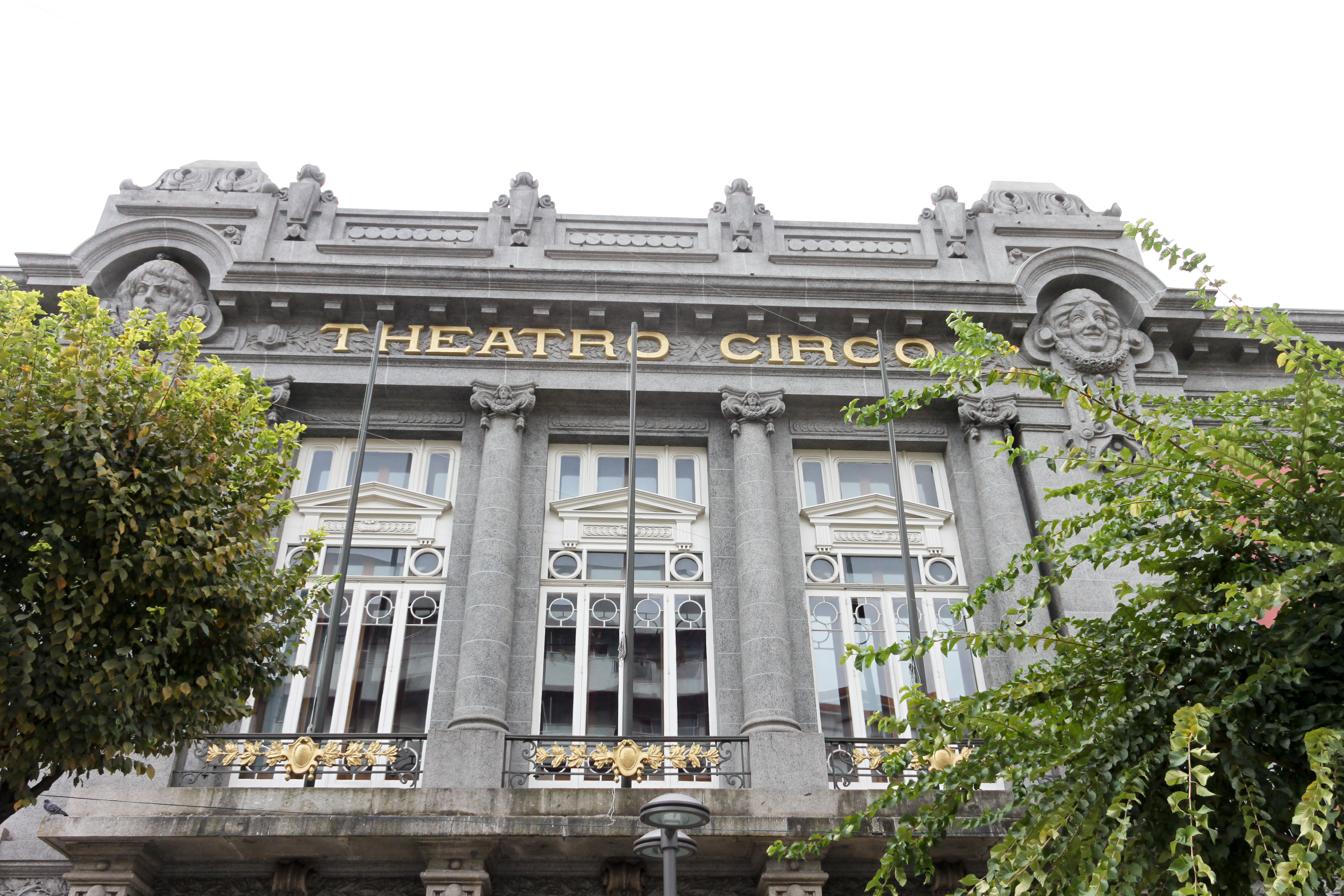
The detailed facade of the Theatre Circo, with sculpted faces

On 25 February 1907, during a session of the municipal council of Braga, which was convened to approve the transfer of buildings, terrains and dependencies of the unoccupied Convent of Remédios (Portuguese: Convento dos Remédios), owing to the planned expansion of the Avenida da Liberidade. The president of the municipal council, through the treasurer, took control of the Convent and the dependencies on the 19th of September, and the next day the demolition of the belvedre, towards the Rua das Águas began.

The need for a new theatre had already become manifest in the artistic community around 1906. At the time the small São Geraldo Theatre (along the Avenida Central with Rua dos Chãos) was the only space used for theatre and cinema, but the larger Portuguese theatre companies could not stage any of their theatrical presentations in the limited stage. Artur José Soares, José António Velosos and Cândido Martins Iiderarm formed the Sociedade do Teatro Circo, and began collecting the materials from the demolished Convent on 16 December 1907.

The construction of the theatre began in 1911, under the supervision of architect João de Moura Coutinho, and continued until 1915 (with a capacity for 1500 people). On 21 April 1911, the theatre was inaugurated with the presentation of the operetta Rainha das Rosas (La reginetta delle rose) by Ruggero Leoncavallo, performed by the Éden Teatro de Lisboa company, under the direction of Luiz Galhardo, and starring Palmira Bastos in the principal role. The following day the actress participated in the unveiling of two marble plaques, in her honour, and to the architect Moura Coutinho for the new building.

The first film was presented on 27 June 1911; Aventuras de Catalina, this was the beginning of a six-year rental agreement with the Sociedade do Teatro Circo. Theatre production was eventually succeeded by the circus, when the Companhia Equestre de W. Frediani began residing in the new hall between May 27 and June 13, 1915. In 1917, the administration of the Theatre Circo acquired the shares of the São Geraldo, selling the building to the Banco de Portugal. Between August 1919 and February 1920, the contractors closed the theatre in order to remodel the main hall. The first opera was sung in 1922. Three years later (January 1925), the rental contract came to maturity, and the Teatro Circo returned to direct administration by the Sociedade.

In October 1927, the administrative council of the Teatro Circo ended its direct administration of the theatre, which passed to José Luís da Costa, a businessman from the Theatre Garrett in Póvoa de Varzim. As a result, in 1928, the first Portuguese cinema began appearing in the theatre, including Fátima Milagrosa and O Primo Basílio, and in October 1930, the first talking pictures, with the reel O Cantor Louco. In 1933, the theatre began running as a concession of José Luís da Costa's businesses, which brought different programs alternating between theatre, circus, cinema and musicals.

On 21 April 1935, celebrations marking the 20th anniversary of the Theatre Circo was inaugurated. Similar festivities were celebrated on 21 April 1940, marking the silver anniversary of the institution, that include performances by tenor Ascenso de Siqueira Freire. Between 1943 and 1950, the prosperity of the theatre reached its peak, and were then followed by a period of remodelling in order to beautify the structure.

A 1958 report presented at the general assembly suggested that there a feeling of crisis, with the introduction of television in local cafés.

On 5 October, the Theatre Circo inaugurated the Hall of Cinema Estúdio.

On 16 February 1983, the group of buildings along the Avenida da Liberdade, which included the Theatre Circo obtained the IGESPAR status of group of properties of public interest.

Around July 1984, the CENA Companhia Profissional de Teatro de Braga is established, and in 1987, the group signed an accord with the Teatro Circo, to occupy space in the great hall.

In 1988, the municipal council acquired the building of the Teatro Circo for 30,0000 contos. Around 2000, new remodelling under the supervision of Sérgio Borges (budgeted at around 2.6 million contos) with funds from European Union and Ministry of Culture (Rede Nacional de Teatros e Cine-Teatros and Rede Municipal de Espaços Culturais) partnerships: the rejuvenated Circo was re-inaugurated on 27 October 2006, with an expansion project, interior and exterior remodeling by Architect Sérgio Borges, serving the municipality of Braga. with profound changes in terms of interior compartmentation, colors and finishes, both interior and exterior, recreating elements and decorative friezes sought to resume the original work after consecutive years of alterations and adaptations, which made the original building uncharacteristic. the lack of elements designed and written about the work made the task of rehabilitation difficult, but allowed us to recreate the spirit of the time with what was possible to do with what existed. a new auditorium, a museum space, a bar, smoking rooms and a café-concert were created with direct access to the theater from the inside.

== Architecture ==
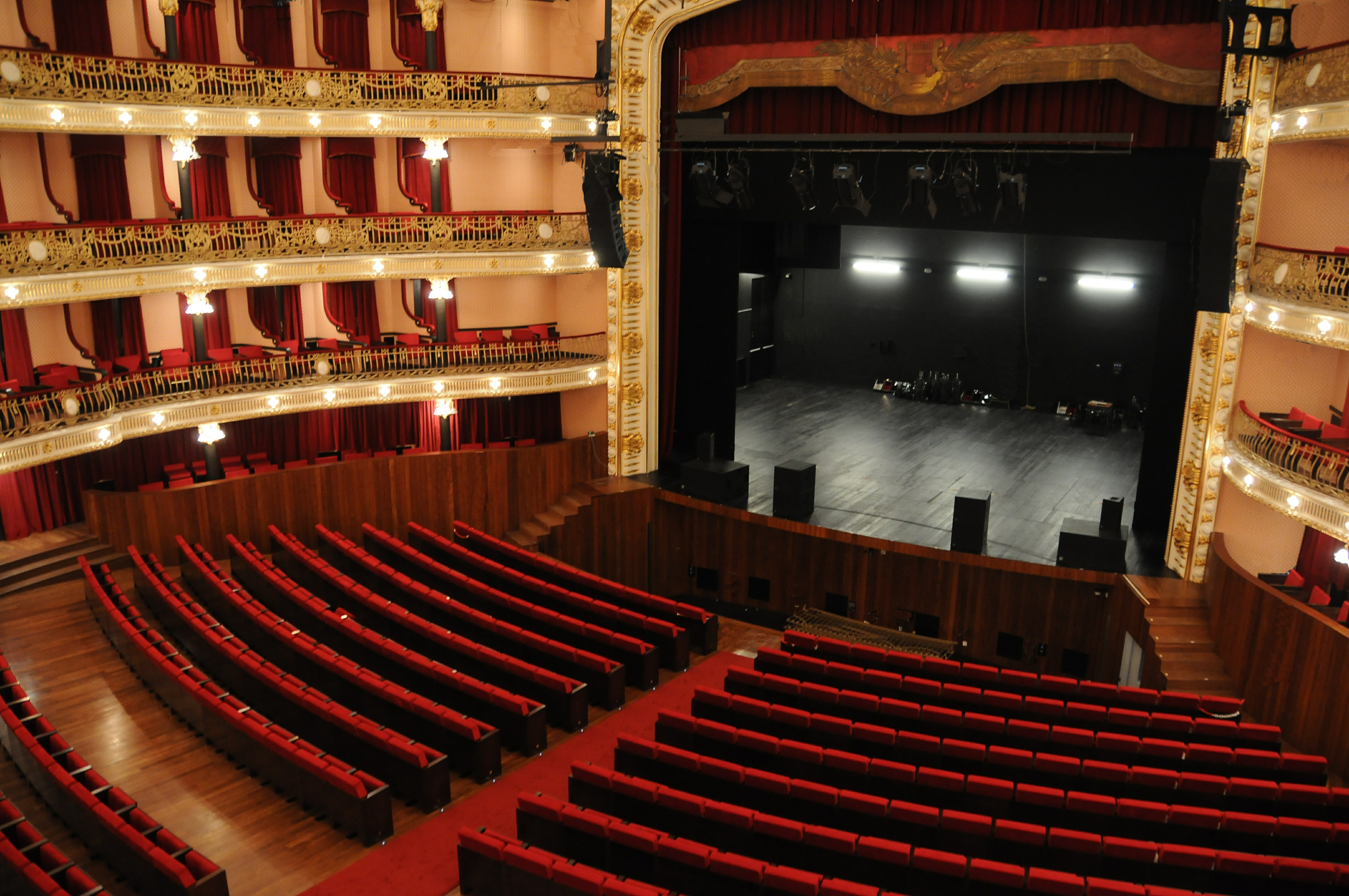
The interior of the theatre, including grande stage and three-storey stalls

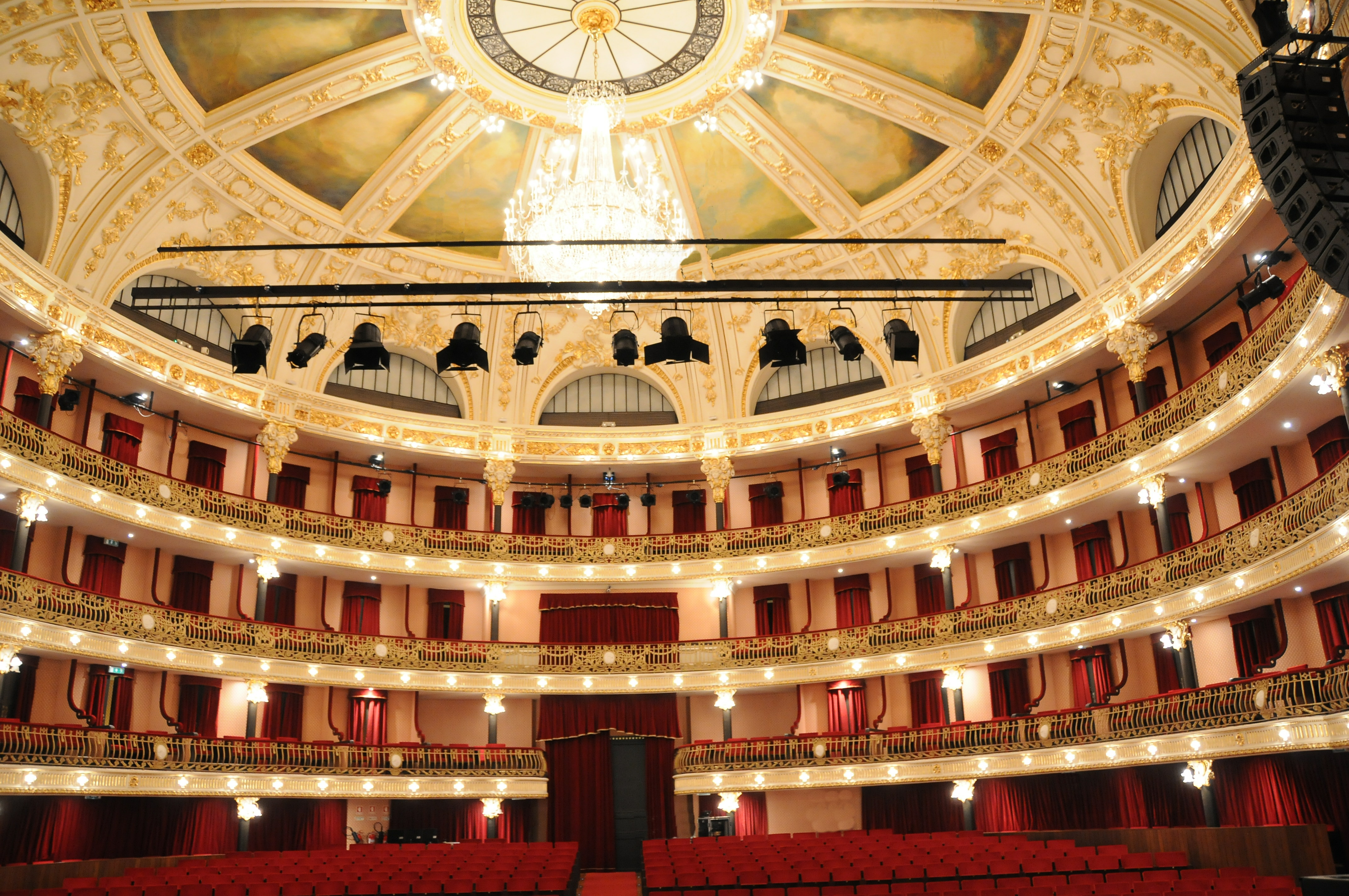
The cupola, showing the panelled arches of red, white and gold, and arch windows

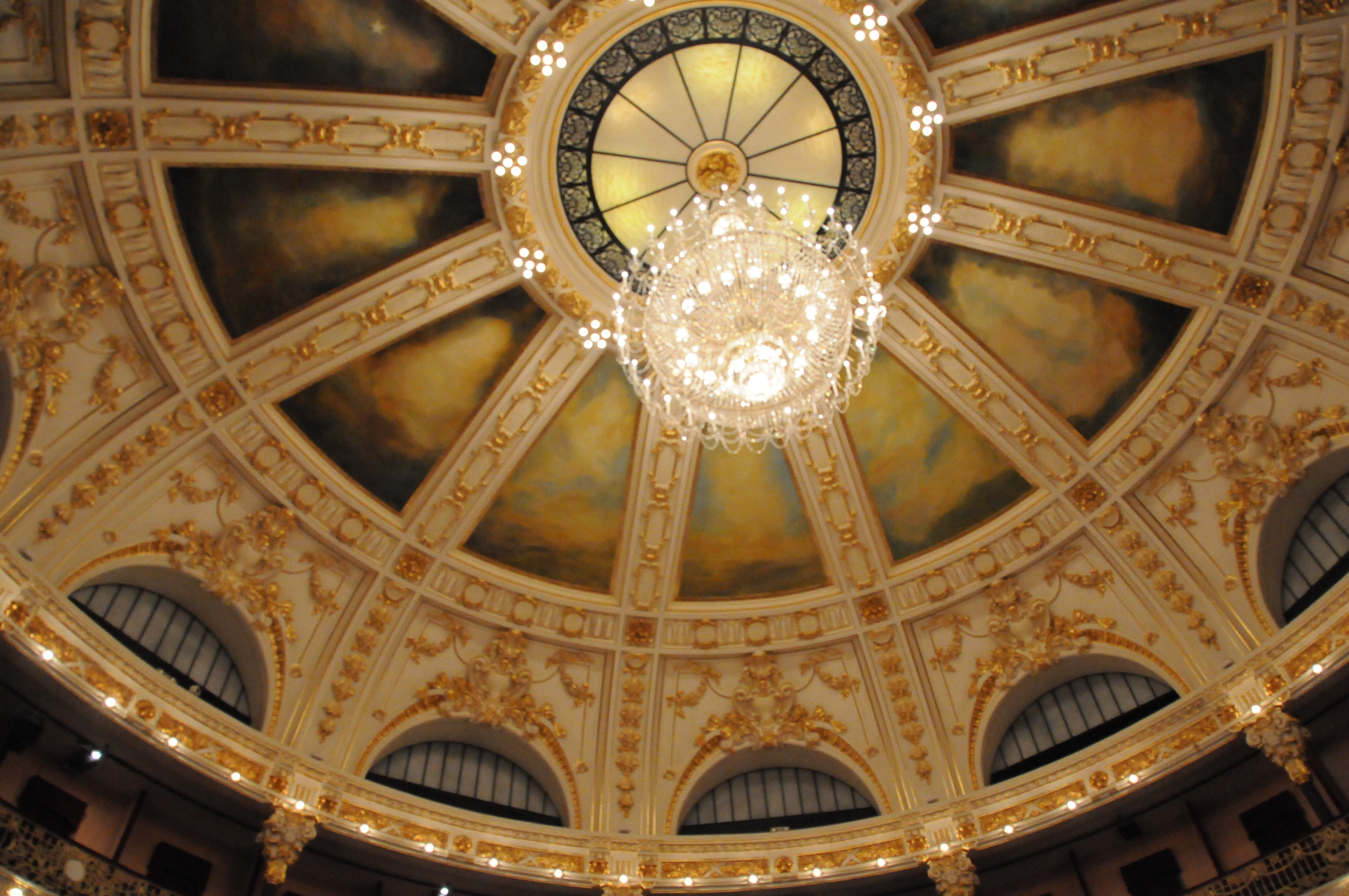
Detail of the cupola and chandelier showing spans

The theatre is located between other buildings, on the corner of Rua Gonçalo Sampaio with Avenida da Liberdade; on one of the principal avenues in the city, the Circo is transited by automobile traffic and pedestrian activity. It is part of frontal facade of a few examples of civil eclectic architecture.

It is a rectangular layout, composed of two adjacent bodies, with staggered horizontal volumes, and the roofs covered in tile. The facades include two registers, plastered and painted rose, over a granite foundation, while topped by a cornice and architrave in granite.

Main facade facing east, of five panels, those at the extreme ends indented, at the level of the upper register. Its centre is marked, by panel stone, with three arched doors, surmounted by balcony topped by lintel, on large corbels, with wrought iron guard. Three doors open at the level of the balcony, each between Ionic columns with wreaths, supporting a cornice, limited by two figureheads with frieze decorated with phytomorphic elements. In turn, the friezes crown a cornice topped sculpted urns, limited by step pyramids. The inscription on the frieze of the principal facade, decorated in phytomorphic elements in bronze, is the title TEATRO CIRCO.

The flanking sections of the principal entranceway, also in granite stone, include three arched doorways surmounted by three rectangular windows and sill, with decorative motifs on the lintels.

The south facade, is marked by three arched doors, similarly topped by wrought iron balcony, with rectangular windows and sills with decorative lintel motifs.

=== Interior ===
The theatre's central foyer is plastered and painted in rose, white and gold, with columns of marble, large glass doors, and a roof consisting of stucco panels painted in white, rose and gold. This space accesses the lounges, bar, dressing rooms and the spectators' seating on the first floor, across a staircase of black marble and metal/wood handrails.

The auditorium, is encircled by three balconies with wrought iron guardrails over columns of cast iron, under a majestic cupola whose spans are stuccoed and painted with geometric motifs, defined by spyglass windows that circle the perimeter.

The interior is highlighted by decorative elements that fill the spaces, such as columns, the decoration on the walls, floors and the organization of the ceilings. The auditorium stresses the grandiosity of the space, the rhythmic organization of the balconies, which are highly decorated, in Neo-Baroque elements.
