= Thomas Ankersmit =

- Born: 1979 (age 46–47); Leiden, Netherlands
- Genres: Experimental, electroacoustic
- Instruments: Modular synthesizer, laptop, saxophone
- Years active: 1998-present
- Labels: PAN, Touch, Ash International, Tochnit Aleph
- Website: www.thomasankersmit.net

Thomas Ankersmit (born 1979, Leiden, Netherlands) is a musician and installation artist based in Berlin and Amsterdam.

His main instrument, both live and in the studio, is the Serge analogue modular synthesizer.

Physical and psychoacoustic phenomena such as sound reflections, infrasonic vibration, otoacoustic emissions, and highly directional projections of sound have been an important part of his work since the early 2000s. His electronic music is also characterized by a deliberate misuse of the equipment, using feedback and disruptions in the signal to create many of the sounds.

Ankersmit frequently collaborates with New York-based minimalist composer Phill Niblock, electroacoustic improviser Valerio Tricoli and noise artist Kevin Drumm.

During the first ten years of his activities, Ankersmit focussed almost exclusively on live performance and installation work. Since 2010, his music has been released on the PAN, Touch and Ash International labels.

== Selected discography ==
- Thomas Ankersmit & Valerio Tricoli: Forma II, CD, PAN, Berlin, 2011
- Thomas Ankersmit: Hangar Performance, Tallinn, May 29, 2010, download, Touch, London, 2010
- Thomas Ankersmit: Live in Utrecht, CD, Ash International, London, 2010
- Thomas Ankersmit/Jim O'Rourke: Weerzin/Oscillators and Guitars, LP, Tochnit Aleph, Berlin, 2005
- Thomas Ankersmit: Alto Saxophone, 3" CD-R, no label, 2001
