= 2562 =

Dutch musician

- Also known as: A Made Up Sound; Dogdaze
- Born: Dave Huismans; 1979 (age 46–47)
- Origin: The Hague, Netherlands
- Genres: Future garage, broken beat, dubstep, techno, outsider house
- Occupations: Record producer, DJ
- Label: Tectonic

Dave Huismans (born 1979), better known by his stage name 2562, is a Dutch musician from The Hague, Netherlands.

Huismans bought his first laptop dedicated for music production in 2003 despite not knowing how to read musical notation.

Having previously released records of various musical styles under the monikers A Made Up Sound and Dogdaze, Huismans created 2562, under which his output is generally described as dubstep. He is known for producing dubstep that takes influence from techno as well.

The debut 2562 album, Aerial (Tectonic Records, 2008), was released to favourable reviews.

== Discography ==
=== Albums ===
- In Dog We Trust (2006), Dogdaze Productions – as Dogdaze
- Aerial (2008), Tectonic – as 2562
- Shortcuts (produced 2004, released 2008), - as Made Up Sound
- Unbalance (2009), Tectonic – as 2562
- Fever (2011), When In Doubt – as 2562
- Air Jordan (2012), When In Doubt - as 2562
- The new today (2014), When In Doubt - as 2562

=== Singles ===
- Kameleon (2007), Tectonic – as 2562
- Channel Two (2007), Tectonic – as 2562
- Techno Dread / Enforcers (2008), Tectonic – as 2562
