= Shackleton (musician) =

- Born: Sam Arthur Shackleton; Lancashire, England
- Genres: Experimental; electronic; techno; post-industrial; avant-garde; dubstep
- Years active: 2004–present
- Labels: Skull Disco, Perlon, Honest Jon's Records, Woe to the Septic Heart!

Sam Arthur Shackleton, better known by his stage name Shackleton, is an English electronic producer and founder of the record labels Skull Disco and Woe to the Septic Heart!.

== History ==
Sam Shackleton was born in Lancashire, England. He participated in various musical projects throughout the years, playing in punk bands as a teenager and later performing as part of a dancehall duo with Earl Fontainelle (a.k.a. Vengeance Tenfold). He first began producing music on a computer in 2003. Around this time, Shackleton was becoming more familiar with grime and dubstep through regular visits with Laurie Osborne (aka Appleblim), Necta Selecta, and Engine Room to FWD>> club nights.

Shackleton's first release was a track entitled "Stalker", released on Mordant Music in 2004. The track was later picked up by Rough Trade Shops and included on their Counter Culture Best of 2004 compilation. The combination of the Rough Trade release and "seeing that people were making interesting bass music" led Shackleton to create the record label Skull Disco with Appleblim in 2005. The label's name was inspired by a book Shackleton was reading "about a tribe from Cameroon who dug up their ancestors remains so as they could enjoy watching the festivities while the living members of the tribe played music, danced and got pissed." Shackleton was impressed with Appleblim's track "Mystikal Warrior", and it appeared on the first Skull Disco release, a double A-side with Shackleton's track "I Am Animal" on the flipside. Shortly after, Shackleton created the now defunct Skull Disco club nights in London.

In 2008, Shackleton and Appleblim said goodbye to the Skull Disco label after ten vinyl releases. In the same year, Shackleton relocated to Berlin.

In 2009, Shackleton released his debut album, Three EPs, on Perlon. The album was originally conceived as three separate releases and was issued on three 12"s. In 2010, Shackleton released Fabric 55, a studio mix based on a previous performance at Fabric. It was the fourth Fabric release to feature a set entirely made up of the artist's own material. Shackleton founded the label Woe to the Septic Heart! in November 2010 with the release of the Man on a String Part 1 and 2 12".

In 2011, Shackleton collaborated with Pinch on the album Pinch & Shackleton, released on Honest Jon's Records. That same year, Shackleton and Vengeance Tenfold were commissioned by SoundUK to create a "Sonic Journey" inspired by sections of two Devon "train lines – part of the main line between Exeter and Totnes, and a section of the Tarka Line between Exeter and Barnstaple."

In 2012, Shackleton's third album, Music for the Quiet Hour / The Drawbar Organ EPs, was released on Woe to the Septic Heart!, once again featuring a collaboration with Vengeance Tenfold providing spoken word vocals.

In 2016 his album with singer Ernesto Tomasini, Devotional Songs (also released on Honest Jon's), was among the year's best for a large number of specialised press, from The Wire and The Quietus to SentireAscoltare and Onda Rock.

== Musical style ==
Shackleton's musical style has been described in the past as falling under dubstep, garage, and techno, but his musical palette in releases in the 2010s has derived from minimalism, musique concrète and dark ambient. It has been noted for its "intense atmospheric gloom" and sense of "tension and paranoia". His sound draws from a wide range of world music, including African, Arabic, and Indian influences. Shackleton has stated that this is not necessarily intentional, saying, "I don't deliberately reference African or Middle Eastern music; I just use sounds that I like and beats that sound good to my ears."

== Discography ==
=== Albums ===
- Three EPs (2009), Perlon
- Pinch & Shackleton (2011), Honest Jon's Records – with Pinch
- Music for the Quiet Hour / The Drawbar Organ EPs (2012), Woe to the Septic Heart!
- Freezing Opening Thawing (2014), Woe to the Septic Heart! (EP)
- Devotional Songs (2016), Honest Jon's Records - with Ernesto Tomasini
- Sferic Ghost Transmits (2017), Honest Jon's Records - with Vengeance Tenfold
- Behind the Glass (2017), Woe to the Septic Heart! - with Anika
- Primal Forms (2020), Cosmo Rhythmatic - with Zimpel
- Departing Like Rivers (2021), Woe to the Septic Heart!
- The Scandal of Time (2023), Woe to the Septic Heart!
- Euphoria Bound (2026), AD 93

=== Mix albums ===
- Fabric 55 (2010), Fabric
