= Beatriz Ferreyra =

Argentine composer

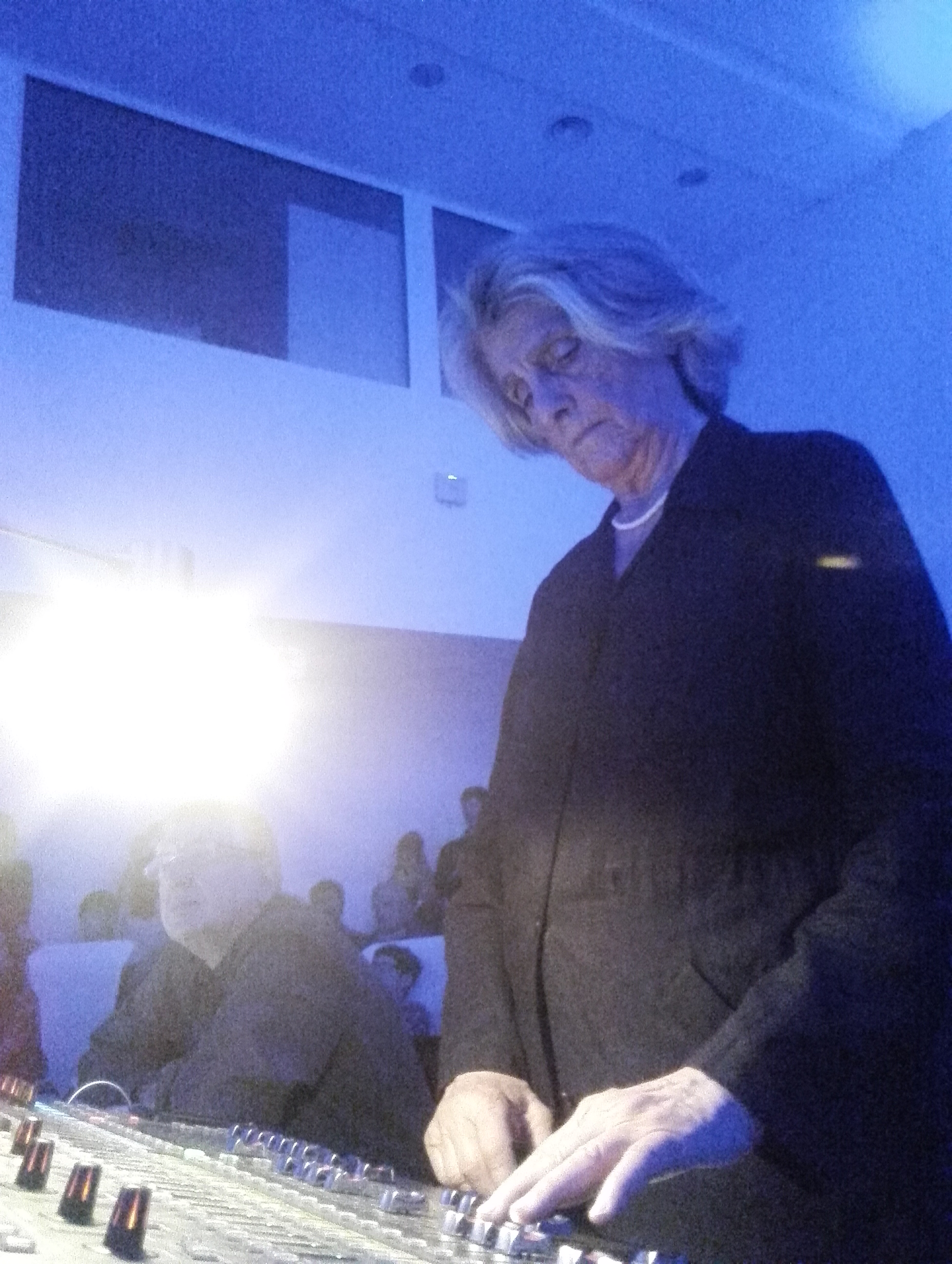

Beatriz Mercedes Ferreyra (born 21 June 1937) is an Argentine composer. She lives and works in Hameau de Hodeng, France.

== Early work and study ==
Ferreyra was born in Cordoba, Argentina, and studied piano with Celia Bronstein in Buenos Aires. She continued her study of music with Nadia Boulanger in Paris, and worked with Earle Brown and György Ligeti in Germany.

== Groupe de Recherches Musicales (GRM) ==
In 1963 she took a position in the research department of the Office de Radiodiffusion Television Francaise (ORTF), working with the Groupe de Recherches Musicales (GRM) directed by Pierre Schaeffer.

She assisted with Henri Chiarucci's and Guy Reibel's Rapport entre la hauteur et la fondamentale d'un son musical, published in 1966 in Revue Internationale d'Audiologie and Pierre Schaeffer's Solfège de l'Objet Sonore. During this time she also lectured at the Conservatoire National Supérieur de Musique de Paris.

== Film music ==
In 1973, Ferreyra was invited to write the music for Fiorella Mariani's film Homo Sapiens (Fiorella is the niece of filmmaker Roberto Rossellini). The hour-long work was completely electroacoustic, for which Ferreyra also did the performing, editing, and mixing.

Mariani's film weaves together footage of people in different groups interacting in both performative and quotidian tasks. The music by Ferreyra is important to weave together a sense of continuity as the film itself presents the contradictions of reality in these different scenarios.

== Collaborations ==
She worked with Bernard Baschet and his Structures Sonores in 1970, and served residencies in electronic music with Dartmouth College in 1976 and in 1998.

In 2015 Ferreyra toured and released an album with Christine Groult, Nahash, on trAce label. The work was commissioned by former of INA-GRM artistic director Christian Zanesi in 2011. The live recording features Ferreyra using "four Revox tape recorders, augmented with an analog matrix and a synchronizer box with self-designed variable speed drives."

== Live performance and recordings in the 21st century ==
Ferreyra has released several albums in the 21st century to critical acclaim. While some of these are re-releases of important earlier works, she has also continued to create new work and perform live (see below, live performance from Festival Zeppelin, 2015), as well as give acoustic composition workshops.

- La Rivière des oiseaux (CD) Motus 2003
- GRM Works (CD) Recollections GRM 2015
- Huellas Entreveradas (vinyl) Persistence of Sound 2020
- Echos + (vinyl) Room40 2020
- Canto + (vinyl) Room40 2021
- UFO Forest + (vinyl) Room40 2023
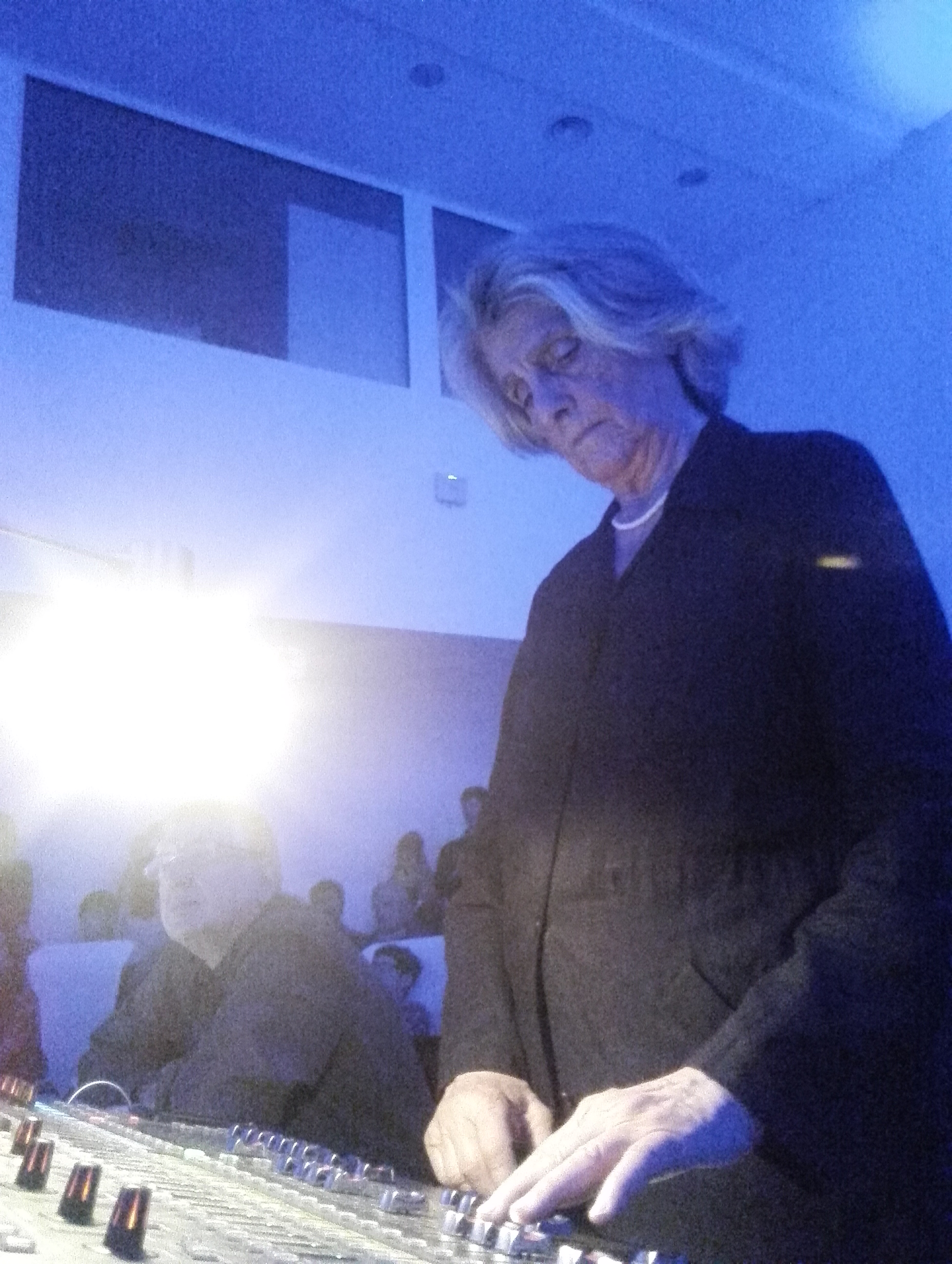
Festival Zeppelin 2015 @ Barcelona

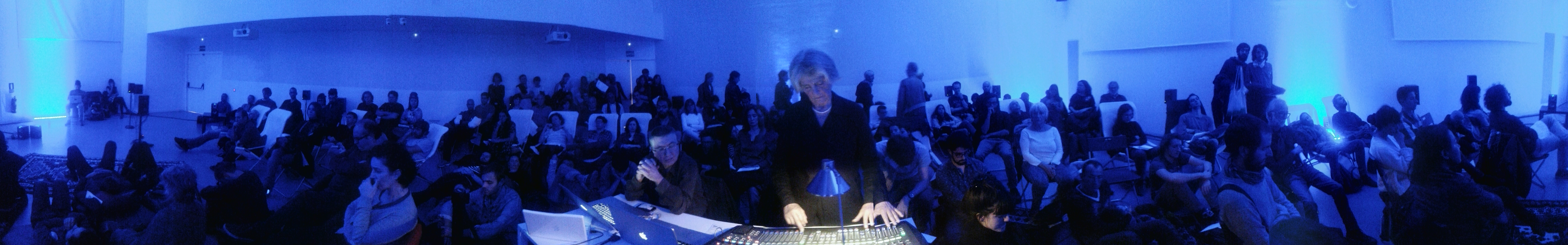
Festival Zeppelin 2015 @ Barcelona

== Works ==
Ferreyra continues to perform internationally commissioned works for concerts and festivals and has also previously composed for ballet, film, radio, television and music therapy. She is an honorary member of CIME/IMC UNESCO. Selected works include:

- Mer d’Azov, étude aux itérations (1963)
- Médisances (1968)
- L’orviétan (1970)
- Siesta Blanca (1972)
- Canto del Loco (1974)
- Echos (1978)
- Petit Poucet magazine (1985)
- The UFO Forest (1986)
- Souffle d’un petit Dieu distrait (1987)
- Ríos del sueno (1998–2000)
- Vivencias (2001)
- Cantos de antes (2002)
- La rivière des oiseaux (2003)
- Dans un point infini (2005)
- L’art de l’étude (2006)
- La condition captive (2006)
- Sourire de l’ange (2006) with Christine Groult
- L'autre Rive / The Other Shore (2007)
- Marche, quitte et va (2008) with Christine Groult
- Impasse (2008) with Inés Wickmann
- Les larmes de l’inconnu (2011)

Her works have been issued on CD and vinyl, including:

- Petit Poucet Magazine (CD) Le Chant Du Monde 1998
