= D. M. Thomas =

British writer (1935–2023)

- Born: Donald Michael Thomas; 25 January 1935; Carnkie, Cornwall, England
- Died: 26 March 2023 (aged 88); Truro, Cornwall, England
- Education: New College, Oxford
- Occupations: Poet; translator; novelist; editor; biographer; playwright
- Spouses: 4
- Children: 3, including Sean
- Writing career
- Period: 1968–2023
- Notable works: The Flute-Player; Dreaming in Bronze; The White Hotel; Ararat; Flying in to Love; The Puberty Tree; Pictures at an Exhibition; Eating Pavlova
- Notable awards: Cholmondeley Award; 1978; Los Angeles Times Book Prize for Fiction; 1981 The White Hotel; Cheltenham Prize for Literature; 1981 The White Hotel; Orwell Prize; 1999 Alexander Solzhenitsyn: a Century in His Life
- Website: www.dmthomasonline.net

Donald Michael Thomas (25 January 1935 – 26 March 2023) was a British poet, translator, novelist, editor, biographer and playwright. His work has been translated into 30 languages.

Working primarily as a poet throughout the 1960s and 1970s, Thomas's 1981 poetry collection Dreaming in Bronze received a Cholmondeley Award. He began writing novels, with The Flute-Player (his second novel, though the first to be published) appearing in 1979. Thomas's third novel The White Hotel won the 1981 Los Angeles Times Book Prize for Fiction, the 1981 Cheltenham Prize for Literature and was shortlisted for the same year's Booker Prize, whose judges were prevented from naming it joint-winner alongside Salman Rushdie's Midnight's Children due to prize rules.

Between 1983 and 1990, Thomas published his "Russian Nights Quintet" of novels, beginning with Ararat and concluding with Summit (inspired by a meeting between Mikhail Gorbachev and Ronald Reagan in Switzerland) and Lying Together (which predicted the dissolution of the Soviet Union and the return of Aleksandr Solzhenitsyn to Russia). He then published Flying in to Love (which concerns the assassination of John F. Kennedy) and five other novels. Bloodaxe Books published The Puberty Tree, the British edition of Thomas's "selected" poems, in 1992. This followed the Penguin Books 1983 publication of Selected Poems, released for U.S. readers following his well-received novel The White Hotel.

A translator from Russian into English, Thomas worked particularly on Anna Akhmatova and Alexander Pushkin, as well as on Yevgeny Yevtushenko. He also wrote a biography of Solzhenitsyn, which was awarded an Orwell Prize in 1999.

== Early life and education ==
Thomas was born to plasterer Harold Thomas and his wife Amy on 25 January 1935, in Carnkie, Redruth, Cornwall. He was a descendant of miners and carpenters. His father spent time living in California during the 1920s and was fond of the United States.

Thomas attended Trewirgie Primary School between 1940 and 1945, then Redruth Grammar School from 1946 until 1949. In 1949, he and his family moved to the Australian city of Melbourne. Thomas spent the years between 1949 and 1951 at University High School there. In 1951, he returned to Carnkie and to Redruth Grammar School.

His National Service was from 1953 until 1955, most of which he spent learning Russian. He retained a lifelong interest in Russian culture and literature. This culminated in a series of well-received translations of Russian poetry from the 1980s onwards, particularly from Anna Akhmatova and Alexander Pushkin, as well as from Yevgeny Yevtushenko. Thomas graduated with First Class Honours in English from New College, Oxford, having studied there between 1955 and 1958. Between 1959 and 1963 he was an English teacher at Teignmouth Grammar School. From 1963 he was an English lecturer at Hereford College of Education until he was made redundant upon its closure in 1978.

== Writing ==
Thomas's first published work was a short story in The Isis Magazine in 1959. He published poetry and some prose in the British science fiction magazine New Worlds (from 1968). Much of what he published until he was 40 years of age was poetry. Two Voices, his first book, was published in 1968; it consisted of poetry. Its title poem relates to science fiction/fantasy.

The title poem of Logan Stone (1971) refers to a balancing rock in Cornwall. Love and Other Deaths (1975) features elegiac poems relating to family. The Honeymoon Voyage (1978) was written around the time of his mother's death. His mother died in 1975.

The Flute-Player, the second novel Thomas wrote, was also published in 1978. Inspired by Russian poetry (especially Anna Akhmatova), it was his first novel to be published and does not contain much dialogue; he had earlier written Birthstone. Birthstone was published in 1980; it is the only one of Thomas's novels to feature his native Cornwall and to deploy instances of Cornish speech. There is also sex, suspenders and psychoanalysis; the London Review of Books described it as "Fantasy as Freud envisaged it, powerful enough to counter reality, working like free association and allowing the unconscious to take over". Dreaming in Bronze, Thomas's 1981 poetry collection, secured for him a Cholmondeley Award.

However, the work that made him famous was not poetry; it was his erotic and somewhat fantastical novel The White Hotel (1981), the story of a woman undergoing psychoanalysis, which proved very popular in continental Europe and the United States. It was shortlisted for the 1981 Booker Prize, coming a close second, according to one of the judges, to the winner, Salman Rushdie's Midnight's Children. Thomas stated in an interview on BBC Radio Cornwall in 2015 that the Booker judges wanted to split the prize between himself and Rushdie, but that the Board informed them that the rules would not permit this, although the rules were indeed changed in this respect the following year. It has also elicited considerable controversy, as some of its passages are taken from Anatoly Kuznetsov's Babi Yar, a novel about the Holocaust. In general, however, Thomas's use of such "composite material" (material taken from other sources and imitations of other writers) is seen as more postmodern than plagiarist. Graham Greene selected The White Hotel for his "Books of the Year". William Golding also selected The White Hotel as his Book of the Year for 1981. Thomas wrote the book during a sabbatical at New College, Oxford in 1978–79. He wrote some of it in Hereford, where he was living and used two typewriters, one in each city. It was translated into 30 languages.

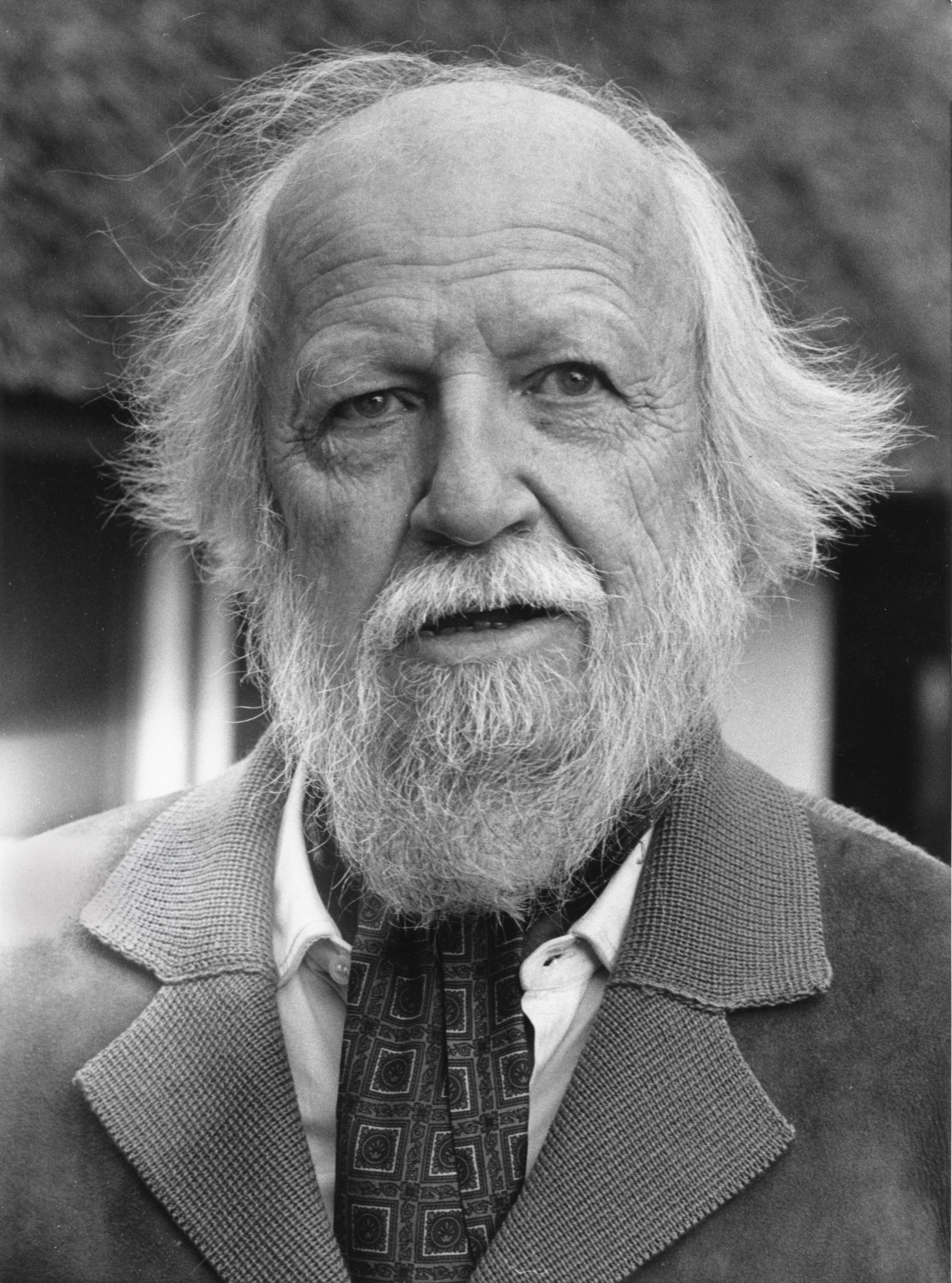
William Golding in 1983; ten years later, D. M. Thomas visited Golding's house on the night of his death.

Follow-up novel Ararat, published in 1983, was the first of a series concerning the Soviet Union, referred to as the Russian Nights Quintet; it was inspired by Thomas's reading of Pushkin and a review of an Armenian poetry anthology which The Times Literary Supplement asked him to write. It was followed by Swallow (1984), Sphinx (1986) Summit (1987) and Lying Together (1990). Summit was inspired by a meeting between Mikhail Gorbachev and Ronald Reagan in Switzerland, while Lying Together predicted the dissolution of the Soviet Union and the return of Aleksandr Solzhenitsyn to Russia.

Thomas's 1992 novel Flying in to Love concerns the assassination of John F. Kennedy (the "Love" in the title refers to Dallas Love Field airport, where Kennedy had landed that morning), as well as the death of his own father in 1960. His 1993 novel Pictures at an Exhibition allowed Thomas to mix his interests in Freud, Nazism and the Holocaust. Its writing was set off by Thomas's attendance at a feminist exhibition, specifically its treatment of the Edvard Munch composition Madonna; writing in the Sunday Independent, critic and journalist Clare Boylan described Pictures at an Exhibition as "a compulsive page-turner". Thomas's 1994 novel Eating Pavlova is set in London in September 1940 and concerns Freud as he dies; The New York Times described it as "the most devious and tragically generous Freud ever envisioned".

His 1998 biography Alexander Solzhenitsyn: a Century in His Life was awarded an Orwell Prize in 1999.

Thomas's 2004 poetry collection Dear Shadows is inspired by photography and its title is a reference to Yeats. His 2006 poetry collection Not Saying Everything is a tribute to his second wife, Denise (whom Thomas described as his Muse), following her death from cancer in 1998. Unknown Shores, a collection released in 2009, consists of all of Thomas's poetry relating to science fiction.

Reluctant for many years to reread his own novels, he eventually did so in October 2010 and concluded that his "strongest" novels are: The White Hotel (1981), Ararat (1983), Flying in to Love (1992), Pictures at an Exhibition (1993), Eating Pavlova (1994) and The Flute-Player (1979).

His fourteenth novel (and his first in fourteen years), Hunters in the Snow appeared in 2014 and takes Vienna ahead of the First World War as its setting.

Thomas wrote reviews for The Times Literary Supplement. He was one of the last people to see William Golding, the Nobel laureate, alive. Thomas visited Golding's house in Perranarworthal as a guest one evening in June 1993; he was the last person unrelated to Golding to leave, doing so around half an hour before Golding collapsed and died whilst preparing to go to bed. Thomas blamed himself for Golding's death and wondered if it would have happened if he had left earlier, with the other guests.

== Awards and honours ==
- c. 1979: Gollancz/Guardian Fantasy Prize, for The Flute-Player
- c. 1981: Cholmondeley Award, for Dreaming in Bronze
- 1981: Los Angeles Times Book Prize for Fiction, for The White Hotel
- 1981: Cheltenham Prize for Literature, for The White Hotel
- P.E.N. Prize, for The White Hotel
- 1981: Booker Prize shortlist, for The White Hotel
- 1999: Orwell Prize, for Alexander Solzhenitsyn: a Century in His Life

== Works ==
=== Poetry ===
- Two Voices (Cape Goliard, 1968)
- Logan Stone (Cape Goliard, 1971)
- The Shaft (Arc, 1973), a long poem
- Love and Other Deaths (Elek Books, 1975)
- The Honeymoon Voyage (Secker & Warburg, 1978)
- Orpheus in Hell (Sceptre, 1977)
- Protest (Hereford, 1980), after a poem by the medieval Armenian poet Frik; with an engraving by Reg Boulton
- Dreaming in Bronze (Secker & Warburg, 1981)
- Selected Poems (Penguin Books, 1983), released in the United States following The White Hotel
- The Puberty Tree (Bloodaxe Books, 1992), the British "selected" edition of Thomas's poetry
- Dear Shadows (Fal Publications, 2004)
- Not Saying Everything (Bluechrome, 2006)
- Unknown Shores (Bluechrome, 2009)
- Flight and Smoke (Francis Boutle, 2010, with signed limited editions available from 2009)
- Two Countries (Francis Boutle, 2011)
- Vintage Ghosts (Francis Boutle, 2012), a verse novel, with six linocut illustrations by Tim Roberts
- Mrs English & other women (Francis Boutle, 2014)
- Corona Man: A Fictional Verse Journal in the Plague Year (The Cornovia Press, 2020) ISBN 1-908878-18-5
- The Last Waltz: Poems (The Cornovia Press, 2021) ISBN 1-908878-22-3
- A Child of Love and War: Verse Memoir (The Cornovia Press, 2021) ISBN 1-908878-23-1

=== Novels ===
Thomas had 14 novels published between 1979 and 2014. The following books form a series known as the Russian Nights Quintet: Ararat (1983), Swallow (1984), Sphinx (1986) Summit (1987) and Lying Together (1990).

- The Flute-Player (Victor Gollancz Ltd, 1979)
- Birthstone (Victor Gollancz Ltd, 1980)
- The White Hotel (Viking Press, 1981)
- Ararat (Victor Gollancz Ltd, 1983)
- Swallow (Victor Gollancz Ltd, 1984)
- Sphinx (Victor Gollancz Ltd, 1986)
- Summit (Victor Gollancz Ltd, 1987)
- Lying Together (Victor Gollancz Ltd, 1990)
- Flying in to Love (Scribner, 1992)
- Pictures at an Exhibition (Bloomsbury, 1993)
- Eating Pavlova (Carroll & Graf, 1994)
- Lady with a Laptop (Carroll & Graf, 1996)
- Charlotte (Duck, 2000)
- Hunters in the Snow (The Cornovia Press, 2014) ISBN 1-908878-12-6 ISBN 1-908878-19-3

=== Memoirs ===
- Memories and Hallucinations (Victor Gollancz Ltd, 1989)
- Bleak Hotel: The Hollywood Saga of the White Hotel (Quartet Books, 2008)

=== Biography ===
- Alexander Solzhenitsyn: A Century in His Life (St Martins, 1998)

=== Play ===
- Hell Fire Corner (2004)

=== Texts edited ===
- The Granite Kingdom (Bradford Barton Ltd, Truro, 1970), an anthology of poems about Cornwall, edited by D. M. Thomas
- Songs from the Earth (Lodenek Press), an anthology of poems by John Harris, edited by D. M. Thomas
- Poetry in Crosslight (Longman, 1975)

=== Translations ===
- Anna Akhmatova, Requiem and Poem without a Hero, (Elek Books, 1976)
- Anna Akhmatova, Way of All the Earth (Secker & Warburg, 1979)
- Alexander Pushkin, The Bronze Horseman: Selected Poems of Alexander Pushkin (Viking Press, 1982)
- Yevgeny Yevtushenko, A Dove in Santiago: A novella in verse (Secker & Warburg, 1982)
- Alexander Pushkin, Boris Godunov (Sixth Chamber Press, 1985)
- Anna Akhmatova, You Will Hear Thunder (Oxford University Press, 1985)
- Anna Akhmatova, Selected Poems (Penguin Books, 1988)
- Anna Akhmatova, Everyman's Library Pocket Poets (Alfred A. Knopf, 2006)
- Alexander Pushkin, Onegin (Francis Boutle, 2010)
- Alexander Pushkin, Ruslan and Ludmila (Simon & Schuster, 2019)

== Personal life ==
Thomas married on four occasions and fathered three children from the first two of those marriages. He married his first wife, Maureen Skewes, in 1958. He had a daughter (born 1960) and a son, Sean (born 1963), with her. He married Denise Aldred in 1976 and their son was born the following year; she would die (of cancer) in 1998, with the three of them having moved to Truro in 1987. He married Victoria Field in 1998 and Angela Embree in 2005.

As well as the Russians Pushkin and Akhmatova, Thomas listed his favourite poets as Robert Frost, William Shakespeare, W. B. Yeats, Charles Causley and Emily Dickinson. His musical interests included Jean Sibelius, Sergei Rachmaninoff and Elgar; his favourite painter was Johannes Vermeer, his second favourite, Edvard Munch.

Thomas died at his home in Truro on 26 March 2023, at the age of 88.
