= Emika (album) =

Studio album by Emika
- Released: 3 October 2011
- Recorded: 2011
- Genre: Electronic; dubstep; trip hop
- Length: 47:36
- Label: Ninja Tune
- Producer: Emika

Emika chronology
Emika (2011)	Dva (2013)

Singles from Emika
- 1. "Drop the Other" Released: 18 January 2010; 2. "Double Edge" Released: 10 May 2010; 3. "Count Backwards" Released: 11 April 2011; 4. "Pretend"/"Professional Loving" Released: 5 September 2011; 5. "3 Hours" Released: 13 February 2012

Emika is the debut studio album by English singer Emika, released on 3 October 2011 by Ninja Tune. The album was written, composed, and performed by Emika and mastered by Berlin engineer Rashad Becker.

== Background ==
Emika chose a software studio as her instrument throughout her musical education and beyond. In Berlin she started to collaborate with engineer Rashad Becker. She has mentioned the roots techno culture as an inspiration because "it was a movement with sound and dancing at its very core. It was not about idols or stars, it was about sound and people coming together to dance and feel free" and also dubstep from Bristol and London, for "originally it was deep spiritual music made by kids for kids". These two influences combined with her being a classically trained pianist and a singer. Speaking of influences, Emika mentioned Delia Derbyshire, the BBC Radiophonic Workshop composer who came up with the original Doctor Who theme music ("not so much for the sounds she made as rather for her questing spirit, it inspires me as I go ahead mapping my own musical realm"), but also Mahler and Rachmaninoff. "Historically they are worlds apart, and yet much of their music shares a beautiful sense for tragedy. The tragedy of life itself, as it were. Not in a way that creates sadness within the listener, but in a way that makes one hold on dearly to every moment lived", she explained.

The songs of the album have been based on narratives. "I start with an idea, a story, and then I seek to find the sound world that best dramatizes my story, making it into a song. I try very hard to stay faithful to my narratives and not fall into the trap of genre conventions which is why I'm shy of genre references", Emika explained.

=== Singles ===
The release of Emika was preceded four singles which later were included into the album. The lead single, "Drop the Other", was released on 18 January 2010, and was followed by "Double Edge" on 10 May 2010. On 11 April 2011, "Count Backwards" was released, "the story of an over-fed yet undernourished soul in search of a little peace and quiet", according to Emika. She expanded:

In times of stress, you can count your date of birth backwards or spell your birth month backwards and the logical side of the mind is kicked into action, resulting in a feeling of calm. Counting backwards is a coping mechanism in overwhelming moments of panic… The song is inspired by my best friend from my teenage years. She was a lot older than me and was in therapy. She told me about how our brain works and how it connects thoughts, feelings and creativity. This was the first moment in my life where I became aware of my own creativity.

The single was remixed by British dubstep producers Kryptic Minds and also Marcel Dettmann.

On 5 September 2011, Ninja Tune released the fourth single "Pretend"/"Professional Loving". The first track, in Emika's words, is "about all sides of fakeness, disbelief, dancing on the head of a pin. It begins with a synth I made to feel like a heartbeat, and ends with psychotic hi-hats playing a melody which will come get you while you sleep", the second about the way in which the music industry uses "friendship" as a form of control. Among the remixers were Berlin experimentalists Brandt Brauer Frick, Kyle Hall and DJ Rashad.

== Critical reception ==
Professional ratings
Review scores
Source	Rating
AllMusic	3.5/5 stars
Drowned in Sound	4/5 stars
The Irish Times	3/5 stars
Mojo	4/5 stars
The Observer	4/5 stars
Pitchfork	7.4/10
PopMatters	6/10 stars
Q	4/5 stars
Resident Advisor	4.0/5
Uncut	4/5 stars

Emika received generally positive reviews from music critics. At Metacritic, which assigns a normalised rating out of 100 to reviews from mainstream publications, the album received an average score of 78, based on 13 reviews. Jon O'Brien of AllMusic wrote that the album's "fusion of ethereal melodies and hushed harmonies with avant-garde electronica and twitchy rhythms is indeed as enchanting as it is unsettling", concluding, "Emika doesn't really sound like anyone else out there, an admirable feat which should appeal to those dismayed by dubstep's recent commercial takeover." Killian Fox of The Observer described the album as "an intriguing work: dark, seductive and as hard to pin down as its creator", adding that "the influence of Portishead can be heard in [Emika's] crystalline vocals, but it doesn't define her." Kyle Ellison of Drowned in Sound praised the album as "varied and impressive" and noted that it has "a remarkable sonic balance, creating a tense, claustrophobic atmosphere that lasts from beginning to end."

Pitchfork's Jeff Weiss viewed Emika as "the product of a dynamic and assured vision, one that retains an alluring sense of mystery." BBC Music's Wyndham Wallace dubbed the album "[d]isconcerting but bewitching" and stated, "Pop enough to be immediately accessible, but dark enough—in fact almost gothic, in the same way as Zola Jesus is gothic—to be mysterious and provocative, Emika leaves you wanting more, even though you know it's sometimes rather troubling." Jim Carroll of The Irish Times found that "[t]here's a wonderful ethereal mood to the tracks, but dig a little deeper and you'll hear her Emika's fondness for dubstep, techno and the minor masterpieces of the BBC Radiophonic Workshop", calling the album "a seductive, impressive affair, the sound of a producer showing just how much potential she has to offer." Andrew Ryce of Resident Advisor expressed that "Emika's music is formidably physical, a quality only amplified by the tense silence that constantly threatens to swallow everything around it. Listen on headphones and you'll get an uncomfortably absent 48 minutes; listen on a good system and you'll be entrapped and immersed." In a mixed review, Timothy Gabriele of PopMatters commented that "[c]ognitive distortion is all over Emika and can at times be sublime", but felt that "[t]here are points on the album meant to pierce that don't hit hard enough and moments of unease which seem swamped down by the overproduction muck."

== Track listing ==
All tracks are written by Emika.

No.	Title	Length
1.	"3 Hours"	4:39
2.	"Common Exchange"	3:33
3.	"Professional Loving"	3:47
4.	"Be My Guest"	4:27
5.	"Count Backwards"	4:00
6.	"Double Edge"	4:39
7.	"Pretend"	4:14
8.	"The Long Goodbye"	4:44
9.	"FM Attention"	3:43
10.	"Drop the Other"	3:28
11.	"Come Catch Me"	4:06
12.	"Credit Theme"	2:16

iTunes Store bonus track
No.	Title	Length
13.	"Save It"	4:51

== Personnel ==
Credits adapted from the liner notes of Emika.

- Emika – vocals, music
- Rashad Becker – mastering, sounds
- Liz Eve – photography
- Michael Hain – design
- Peter Quicke – A&R
- Simon Skevington – A&R
