= Honest Jon's =

British record label and shop

Honest Jon's Records
- Country of origin: United Kingdom
- Official website: Official site

Honest Jon's is a British independent record shop based on Portobello Road in Ladbroke Grove, London, operating since 1974. The shop is owned and run by Mark Ainley and Alan Scholefield, who took over from one of the original proprietors, "Honest" Jon Clare. Their record label of the same name is run in conjunction with Damon Albarn, who has been quoted as saying: "I don't really like the term world music. Wherever it comes from, it's all just music, isn't it? Hopefully that's what Honest Jon's is about – to open a few minds to what's out there."

The shop sells a multitude of genres of music on vinyl and CD, specializing in jazz, blues, reggae, dance, soul, folk and outernational. It runs a mail-order business.

Formed in 2002, the label has released compilation albums such as its London Is the Place for Me series, excavating the music of young Black London, in the years after World War II ("a fascinating archive of material from the 1950s and 1960s, chronicling a time when diasporic rhythms were more or less the sole preserve of the small communities responsible for bringing them to these shores"); also collections of British folk, Port-of-Spain soca, Afro-Cuban jazz from the Bronx, Jamaican dancehall; and retrospectives of artists including Moondog, Maki Asakawa, Bettye Swann and Cedric "Im" Brooks & The Light of Saba. The label has released original music by Candi Staton, Actress, T++, Hypnotic Brass Ensemble, Mark Ernestus, Trembling Bells, The Good, the Bad & the Queen, Simone White, Shackleton, Michael Hurley, Terry Hall, DJ Sotofett, and the Moritz Von Oswald Trio, Vladislav Delay Quartet, Insanlar & Ricardo Villalobos, Kassem Mosse, Pinch, Don't DJ, Tribe of Colin and many more. It recorded the chaabi orchestra of Abdel Hadi Halo on location in Algiers; Lobi Traore and Kokanko Sata Doumbia in Bamako; and Tony Allen in Lagos.

In 2008, Honest Jon's began a run of compilations of early recordings – mostly drawn from the EMI Archive in Hayes, Hillingdon – stretching back to the start of the twentieth century, covering all corners of the world: from the break-up of the Ottoman Empire more than a hundred years ago, to 1950s Beirut, to late-1920s Baghdad, to 1930s East Africa.

== See also ==
- List of record labels
