= Pinch (dubstep musician) =

- Born: Robert Huw Ellis; 1980 (age 45–46); Scotland
- Origin: Bristol, England
- Genres: Dubstep, bass music
- Occupations: Electronic music producer, DJ
- Labels: Planet Mu, Soul Jazz, Tectonic, Swamp 81

Rob Ellis, better known as Pinch, is a British dubstep DJ, producer and label manager from Bristol, England. He is known for his fusion of styles such as reggae, World music, and dancehall with dubstep and his roles as founder of the record label Tectonic and co-founder of the club night Subloaded.

He released his debut album, Underwater Dancehall in 2007, via Tectonic. One of Pinch's most well-known tracks is "Qawwali", released on Planet Mu records, which references the devotional singing of the same name, and featured samples of harmonium and singer Nusrat Fateh Ali Khan. His songs appear on compilations such as Box of Dub: Dubstep and Future Dub 2 (Soul Jazz Records), Science Faction: Dubstep (Breakbeat Science Recordings), 10 Tons Heavy (Planet Mu) and 200 (Planet Mu). More recently, he has moved away from dubstep towards the UK bass scene, working with producers such as Mumdance and Adrian Sherwood.

== Early life ==
Ellis was born in Scotland but moved to Newport, Wales at age 6 where he grew up until settling at nearby Bristol as an adult. As a child his interest in music was influenced by his older brother who made him tapes of Dub music.

== Discography ==
=== Studio albums ===
- Underwater Dancehall 2CD: Tectonic TECCD003, 2007
- Pinch & Shackleton LP: Honest Jon's Records – with Shackleton, 2011
- Late Night Endless (with Sherwood): Tectonic, 2015
- Man Vs Sofa (with Sherwood): On-U Sound/Tectonics 2017
- Reality Tunnels: Tectonic, 2020

=== EPs and singles ===
- War Dub/Alien Tongue 12": Tectonic TEC001, 2005
- Punisher 12"/Digital: Planet Mu ZIQ163, 2006
- Punisher (remixes) 12"/Digital: Planet Mu ZIQ163R, 2006
- Qawwali 12"/Digital: Planet Mu ZIQ133, 2006
- One Blood, One Source/Trauma 12"/Digital: (limited edition album sampler) - Tectonic TEC017, 2007
- Pepper Spray/Cave Dream 12"/Digital: Planet Mu ZIQ196, 2007
- Chamber Dub 12"/Digital: Soul Jazz Records SJR 187–12, 2008
- Dr Carlson/136 Trek 12"/Digital: Punch Drunk DRUNK 007, 2008
- Croydon House/Elements 12": Swamp 81 SWAMP 007, 2011
- Swish/Tunnel Home 12"/Digital: Deep Medi, 2011
- Retribution/Get Out Of Here 12"/Digital: Swamp 81, 2011
- Acid Reign/M25FM (with Photek) 12"/Digital: Photek Productions, 2012
- Shoulda Rolla (with Roska) Tectonic : 12"/Digital, 2013
- Bring Me Weed (with Sherwood) On-U Sound: 12"/CD/Digital, 2013
- Music Killer (with Sherwood) On-U Sound : 12"/CD/Digital, 2013
- Turbo Mitzi/Whiplash (with Mumdance) Tectonic : 12"/Digital, 2914
- Obsession (The Possession) Tectonic : 12"/Digital, 2014
- Down Cold Recordings : 12", 2014
- Big Slug/Lucid Dreaming (with Mumdance) Tectonic: 12"/Digital, 2015
- Stand Strong (with Sherwood) Tectonic : CD, 2015
- Screamer/ No Justice Tectonic : 12"/Digital, 2016

=== Compilation albums ===
- FabricLive.61: Fabric, 2012
