= Tectonic (record label) =

- Parent company: Multiverse Music
- Founded: 2005; 20 years ago
- Founder: Pinch
- Genre: Dubstep
- Country of origin: UK
- Location: Bristol
- Official website: www.tectonicrecordings.com

Tectonic is a British electronic music label, founded and run by Rob Ellis (Pinch) which focuses primarily on dubstep and its related genres. As one of the founding dubstep labels, alongside Tempa, DMZ, Hyperdub, and Hotflush, Tectonic became a focal point for the Bristol scene, as well as introducing artists and releases that were among the first to bridge a gap between dubstep and techno.

Alongside releases from artists such as Skream, Benga, Digital Mystikz & Joker, Tectonic has also been responsible for some of the scene's albums – particularly, 2562's Unbalance and Pinch's Underwater Dancehall.

== Catalogue ==
Title	Artist	Cat No	Format	Year
War Dub / Alien Tongue	Pinch & P Dutty	TEC001	12"	2005
Shellcode	Moving Ninja	TEC002	12"	2005
28g / Fearless	Loefah & Skream	TEC003	12"	2005
Random Trio EP	Cyrus	TEC004	12"	2005
Rebellion	Omen	TEC005	12"	2006
Bahl Fwd / Temptation	Skream / Distance	TEC006	10"	2006
Wear The Crown / Slang	DQ 1 / Mark One	TEC007	10"	2006
System / Molten	Loefah / Digital Mystikz	TEC008	10"	2006
Iron Man / Nightmarez	Armour / Hijak	TEC009	10"	2006
Tectonic Plates	Various	TECD001	CD	2006
Formations	Moving Ninja	TEC010	12"	2007
From The Shadows LP – Disc 1	Cyrus (Random Trio)	TEC011	12"	2007
From The Shadows LP – Disc 2	Cyrus (Random Trio)	TEC012	12"	2007
From The Shadows LP – Disc 3	Cyrus (Random Trio)	TEC013	12"	2007
From The Shadows	Cyrus (Random Trio)	TECCD002	CD	2007
Gud Money / Structive	DQ 1	TEC014	12"	2007
Channel Two / Circulate	2562	TEC015	12"	2007
Channel Two / Circulate	2562	TEC016	12"	2007
One Blood, One Source / Trauma	Pinch	TEC017	12"	2007
Underwater Dancehall (Instrumentals)	Pinch	TEC018	12"	2007
Underwater Dancehall (Album)	Pinch	TECCD003	CD	2007
Infinity Is Now / Junktion	Peverelist	TEC019	12"	2008
Techno Dread / Enforcers	2562	TEC020	12"	2008
Aerial	2562	TEC021	12"	2008
Aerial	2562	TECCD004	CD	2008
Hedd Banger / Percression	Skream	TEC022	12"	2008
Over It / Forward Youth	RSD	TEC023	12"	2008
Midnight Oil / Joyride	Pinch	TEC024	12"	2008
Yet / Kontrol	Martyn / 2562	TEC025	12"	2009
Trapped in a Dark Bubble / Technocal	Skream / Benga	TEC026	12"	2009
Glendale Galleria / Untitled_Rsn	Flying Lotus / Joker	TEC027	12"	2009
False Flag / Junktion (Shed Remix)	Pinch & Moving Ninja / Peverelist	TEC028	12"	2009
Tectonic Plates Volume 2	Various (Compilation)	TECCD005	CD	2009
Love in Outer Space	2562	TEC029	12"	2009
The Chase	Jack Sparrow	TEC030	12"	2009
Space Cadet / Junk Yard	Cyrus (Random Trio)	TEC031	12"	2009
768	Kryptic Minds	TEC032	12"	2009
Clockwork / One Blood, One Source (Distance Remix)	Distance	TEC033	12"	2009
Unbalance	2562	TEC034	12"	2009
Unbalance (Album)	2562	TECCD006	CD	2009
Get Up (Single)	Pinch ft. Yolanda	TECCD007	CD	2009
City Hopper	Joker	TEC036	12"	2009
Terminal / Torment	Jack Sparrow	TEC037	12"	2010
Fox Trot Mannerisms EP	Pursuit Grooves	TEC038	12" EP	2010
Time Ends / Jahwan	Jakes / Darqwan	TEC039	12"	2010
The Boxer	Pinch	TEC040	12"	2010
The Scientist Launches Dubstep into Outer Space	Scientist	TEC046	LP	2011
Dreamstealin / Blood Music	Illum Sphere	TEC047	12"	2011
Broken / Paranormal Activity	Pinch / Loefah / Roska	TEC048	12"	2011
This Is It / Make Um Bounce	Addison Groove	TEC049	12"	2011
Closer	Photek	TEC050	12"	2011
Angry Acid / French Science	Distal	TEC051	12"	2011
The City / Teacher	Author	TEC052	12"	2011
Author	Author	TEC053	LP	2011
Reboot / Bazurk	Distance	TEC054	12"	2012
Booyant / Amphibian	Distal	TEC055	12"	2012
Civilization	Distal	TEC060	LP	2012
Askum / When Two Paths Cross	Kryptic Minds	TEC061	12"	2012
Uncertain / Vendetta	Grenier	TEC062	12"	2012
Decibel EP	Decibel	TEC063	12"	2012
Against The Tide / Trinity	V.I.V.E.K	TEC064	12"	2012
Blurry / Spearhead	Roska	TEC065	12"	2012
Blue Meanie / Searching	Distance	TEC066	12"	2012
Warrior / The Dome	Gemmy	TEC067	12"	2012
Duty / Texers	Beneath	TEC068	12"	2013
Confunktion / Double U	Dark Sky	TEC069	12"	2013
Shoulda Rolla / Asbestos	Pinch, Roska	TEC070	12"	2013
Tectonic Plates Volume 4	Various Artists	TEC071	LP	2013
