= Aya (music producer) =

English musician

Aya Sinclair, known mononymously as Aya (stylised in all lowercase), is an English musician and producer from Huddersfield.

== History ==
Sinclair began her career recording music under the moniker Loft.

In 2016, she released an EP titled Turbulent Dynamics.

In 2018, Sinclair released a compilation of her bootlegs and edits from that year.

In 2019, she released another EP under the moniker Loft, titled and departt from mono games.

In 2021, Sinclair changed her recording name from Loft to Aya. She released her debut album Im Hole as aya the same year, and the album received a "Best New Music" designation from Pitchfork.

In 2024, aya released a new EP titled Lip Flip.

In 2025, she released her second album, Hexed!, through Hyperdub, with Pitchfork calling it one of "the most unhinged albums of the year".

== Discography ==
=== Studio albums ===
- Im Hole (Hyperdub, 2021)
- Hexed! (Hyperdub, 2025)

=== EPs ===
- Lip Flip (self-released, 2024)
