= Joker (British musician) =

British DJ, producer and remixer

- Born: Liam Sylvester McLean; 30 January 1989 (age 37); Bristol, England
- Genres: Purple sound; dubstep; electronic; grime
- Occupations: DJ; producer; remixer; songwriter
- Years active: 2007–present
- Labels: Kapsize; Terrorhythm; Hyperdub; Tectonic; 4AD

Liam Sylvester McLean (born 30 January 1989), better known by his stage name Joker, is a British record producer and audio engineer, known for pioneering the subgenre of purple sound.

He has contributed to two compilations released by the London-based record company Hyperdub. He also runs his own label known as Kapsize Recordings. His debut album, The Vision, was released on 31 October 2011, through independent label 4AD. His sophomore LP, The Mainframe, was released on 16 February 2015, through his own Kapsize imprint.

Since mixing Swindle's 2019 album No More Normal, McLean has worked as an audio engineer in both popular music and underground music scenes, and has mastered music by Stormzy and Hudson Mohawke among others.

== Discography ==
=== Studio albums ===
- The Vision (4AD, 2011)
- The Mainframe (Kapsize, 2015)

=== Singles and EPs ===
- Kapsize EP (Earwax, 2007)
- "Holly Brook Park" / "80's" (Kapsize, 2008)
- "Play Doe" / "Tempered" (Joker & Rustie / Rustie) (Kapsize, 2008)
- "3K Lane" / "Modem" (Jakes vs Joker / Jakes) (H.E.N.C.H / Terrorhythm, 2008)
- "Snake Eater" / "Move Dis" (Joker / TRG) (Soul Motive, 2008)
- Top of the Game EP (Terrorhythm, 2008)
- "Do It" / "Psychedelic Runway" (Kapsize, 2009)
- "Digidesign" / "You Don't Know What Love Is" (Joker / 2000F & J Kamata) (Hyperdub, 2009)
- "Purple City" / "Re-Up" (with Ginz) (Kapsize, 2009)
- "Untitled_rsn" (Note: from Tectonic Plates Volume 2 compilation album) (Tectonic, 2009)
- Hyperdub 5.2 EP (Joker & Ginz / Zomby / Samiyam) (Hyperdub, 2009)
- "City Hopper" / "Output 1-2" (Tectonic, 2009)
- "Tron" (Kapsize, 2010)
- "It Ain't Got a Name" (with TC) (free download, 2010)
- Gully Goon Estate EP (with Terror Danjah & Illmana) (Hardrive, 2011)
- "The Vision (Let Me Breathe)" (Note: album version does not feature Freddie Gibbs; single also includes the instrumental version) (featuring Jessie Ware & Freddie Gibbs) (4AD, 2011)
- "Slaughter House" (Note: formerly known as "Here Come the Lights", as seen on vinyl edition) (featuring Silas of Turboweekend) (4AD, 2011)
- The Vision Instrumentals (4AD, 2011)
- "On My Mind" (featuring William Cartwright) (Goldie & Rustie mixes) (4AD, 2011)
- "Lost" (featuring Buggsy & Otis Brown) (incl. Redlight Remix) (4AD, 2012)
- "Skitta" / "I Think You Should Know" (featuring Newham Generals) (Kapsize, 2012)
- "Old Era" (Kapsize, 2012)
- Face Off EP (Kapsize, 2013)
- Headtop EP (Kapsize, 2014)
- "Midnight" (Kapsize, 2014)
- The Phoenix EP (Kapsize, 2016)
- XXIV Bit EP (Kapsize, 2016)
- Fantasy (Kapsize, 2017)
- Mad Night / Melkweg Bass (Kapsize, 2017)
- Anamorphic / Forever (Kapsize, 2018)
- Marching Orders / Polka Dot (Kapsize, 2018)
- Boat / Deploy (Kapsize, 2018)
- Juggernaut / S Wave (Kapsize, 2024)
- Elastic Band / Small Room (Kapsize, 2024)

=== Remixes ===
- Little Boots – "Meddle" (Joker Remix) (2008)
- The Heavy – "How You Like Me Now?" (Joker Remix) (2009)
- Basement Jaxx – "Raindrops" (Joker & Ginz Remix) (2009)
- Zero 7 – "Everything Up (Zizou)" (Joker & Ginz Remix) (2009)
- Adam Freeland – "Do You" (Joker Remix) (2009)
- Example – "Watch the Sun Come Up" (Joker & Ginz Remix) (2009)
- The Body Snatchers – "I Like What I See" (Joker Remix) (2009)
- Turboweekend – "Trouble Is" (Joker Remix) (2009)
- Primary 1 & Riton – "Radiates" (Joker Remix) (2009)
- Simian Mobile Disco – "Cruel Intentions" (Joker Remix) (2010)
- Sub Focus – "Could This Be Real" (Joker Remix) (2010)
- Gorillaz – "Doncamatic" (Joker Remix) (2010)
- Example – "Close Enemies" (Joker Remix) (2012)
- Congo Natty – "Jah Warriors" (Joker's Space Cake Remix) (2013)
- Dr. Kucho! & Gregor Salto – "Can't Stop Playing (Makes Me High)" (Joker Remix) (2015)
