= DJ Spooky discography =

This is a discography for electronic and experimental hip hop musician DJ Spooky. It lists studio albums, singles, EPs, collaborations, sideman appearances and albums released under his given name Paul D. Miller.

== Albums ==
- Necropolis (Knitting Factory Works KFW 185), March 1996
- Songs of a Dead Dreamer (Asphodel Records 0961), April 1996
- Synthetic Fury EP (Asphodel Records 0110), February 1998
- Haunted Breaks Volumes I and II (Liquid Sky Music), October and December 1998
- Riddim Warfare (Outpost-Geffen CD), September 1998; (Asphodel Records Vinyl), December 2002
- Under the Influence (Six Degrees PRCD 1056–2) (DJ mix record), September 2001
- Songs of a Dead Dreamer (2002 Edition) (Asphodel Records 2009), January 2002
- Modern Mantra (Shadow/Instinct SDW 135–2) (DJ mix record), May 2002
- Optometry (Thirsty Ear THI 57121.2), July 2002
- DJ Spooky That Subliminal Kid vs. Twilight Circus Dub Sound System - Riddim Clash, 2004
- Drums of Death DJ Spooky vs. Dave Lombardo (Thirsty Ear), April 2005
- The Secret Song (Thirsty Ear), October 2009
- Of Water and Ice (Jamendo), June 2013

== Singles and EPs ==
- Galactic Funk (Asphodel 101), 1997
- Object Unknown (with remixes by DJ Spooky and Kut Masta Kurt) (Outpost/Geffen CD; Asphodel vinyl), August 1998
- Peace in Zaire (with remixes by Ambassador Jr., and The Dub Pistols) promotional/White Label Only (Outpost/Geffen), April 1999
- Subliminal Minded EP-Peace in Zaire Remixes (Bar None Records), October 1999
- Catechism featuring Killah Priest (Synchronic), August 2002, SYC 002
- Optometrix 12” (Thirsty Ear), June 2003, THI 57132.1

== Labels ==
- Outpost-Geffen Records
- Trojan Records
- Thirsty Ear Records
- Asphodel Records

== Paul D. Miller and miscellaneous albums ==
- Death in Light of the Phonograph: Excursions into the Pre-linguistic Asphodel Records, September 1996, (limited edition) Originally accompanied installation at Annina Nosei Gallery.
- The Viral Sonata Asphodel Records. Originally accompanied installation for The Whitney Biennial 1997
- ftp>snd>untitled> Nest Magazine CD, accompanying November 2001 issue
- Another Forensic Charade, accompanying catalogue to exhibition at Magasin 3, Stockholm, Sweden, September, December 2001 (limited edition)

== Collaborative releases and mix records ==
- Automaton: Dub Terror Exhaust (Strata), 1994
- Template 12” DJ Spooky and Totemplow (Manifold Records), 1998
- 10” DJ Spooky and Alan Licht (Manifold Records), 1998
- Kaotik : Transgression DJ Spooky and Totemplow (Manifold Records), June 1999
- 10” DJ Spooky and Arto Lindsay (Manifold Records), July 1999
- 10” DJ Spooky and Quoit (Manifold Records), 2000
- 10” DJ Spooky and Merzbow (Manifold Records), 2000
- DJ Spooky vs. The Freight Elevator Quartet: File Under Futurism (Caipirinha Records), September 1999
- The Quick and the Dead DJ Spooky and Scanner (Sulphur Records) Meld series, 2000-01-31, Cat No. MELCD001 (UK) BBWULCD004 (US)
- Anodyne (Main, core and Peripheral mixes) Picture disk w/Sound Secretion (BSI Records) Cat. BSI 014–1, October 2000
- Cinemage by Ryuichi Sakamoto w/ David Sylvian, 2000.
- Catechism (DJ Spooky w/Killah Priest) (Blue Juice Records/UK) BJ007, 2001-06-26
- DJ Spooky: Under the Influence: A mix with Six Degrees Records, September 2001
- Modern Mantra: A label mix for Shadow Records, May 2002
- Dubtometry featuring Mad Professor, Lee “Scratch” Perry, and others — a remix of “Optometry (Thirsty Ear), March 2003, THI 57128.2
- Rhythm Science Audio Companion — C-Side: companion to Rhythm Science book, 2003
- Riddim Clash with Twilight Circus (PLAY Label), April 2004
- Celestial Mechanix: a label mix for Thirsty Ear Records, June 2004
- DJ Spooky presents In Fine Style: 50,000 Volts of Trojan Records: a 2CD label mix for Trojan Records, June 2006
- DJ Spooky presents Riddim Come Forward: 50,000 Volts of Trojan Records: a 2CD label mix for Trojan Records, UK release, October 2006
- Creation Rebel (Trojan/Sanctuary), October 2007

== Film scores ==
- SLAM (Offline/Tri-Mark) Grand Prize winner, Sundance, 1998; Cannes, Camera D'Or, 1998; October 1998 commercial release.
- Quattro Noza (Fountainhead Films) Sundance competition finalist, 2003

== Multimedia, web and misc. projects ==
- Stuzzicadenti DJ Spooky and Diego Cortez, May 2000
- Marcel Duchamp remix, LA Museum of Contemp. Art, 2002

== Remixes ==
- Hooverphonic – "2Wicky" Epic
- Spookey Ruben – "Incidental Drift Mix" TVT Records
- DJ Krush – "Ryuki" (Lulu's Peace Mix) TVT Records
- Ben Neill – "Pentagram: La Mer Mix and Undertow Mix" (Verve Antilles) 1996
- Ben Neill – "Sistrum into Grapheme" Astralwerks
- James Plotkin Sawtooth Swirl "DJ Spooky's Irreducible Gated Momentum Dub Mix" (9:40), 1997 (Rawkus ptv 1136–2)
- Walter Ruttman's Weekend for Engaged Magazine Vol. 6, London, UK
- Hovercraft Stereo Specific Polymerization "Mad Psychotic Hyper-Accelerated Lower East Side Mix" (5:57)
- Earth Crooked Axis for String Quartet "Kool Stereo Arc" Dub Mix (8:42)
- Arto Lindsay – "Mundo Civilizado Inversion Mix" 7:28, Gramavision, June 1997, GLP 79519
- Metallica – For Whom the Bell Tolls "The Irony Of It All" 4:41 for Spawn Soundtrack, Immortal/Epic Records, New Line Cinema; August 1997, EK68494
- Sublime – "Doin' Time" (Life Sentence Remix) 5:43 MCA Records; September 1997
- Free Kitten – Jam #1 "Spatialized Chinatown Express Mix" (6:24), Kill Rock Stars, November 1997. KRS 286
- Nick Cave – "Red Right Hand" for Scream 2 soundtrack Capitol Records, December 1997
- The Swirlies – "In Harmony: DJ Spooky's Retrograde Transposition Mix" (6:15) Taang! Records
- Bally Sagoo – Tum Bin Jiya "Isomorphic Flux Mix" 6:47 Higher Ground/Sony
- Skeleton Key – "Wide Open" (DJ Spooky's Full Spectrum Mix) Capitol Records
- KoЯn – "Got the Life" Immortal/Epic, November 1998 (Limited Edition)
- Cibo Matto – "Swords and Paintbrush" Warner Bros., 1999
- Steve Reich – "City Life" Coalition/None Such Recordings, March 1999
- Show Lee Netsu: Electro: snd>>cd: zero sum mix BMG Funhouse (Japan) BVCR-11015, October 1999
- Hydroponic Sound System Routine Insanity/Evolution Records, September 2000
- Kahimi Karie Tilt Polydor KK Records (Japan), 2000
- "Rock the Nation" (DJ Spooky sound Unbound instrumental remix) with Michael Franti and Spearhead (Six Degrees Records), 2001
- Merzbow – Ikebana Merzbow Important Records, 2003
- Meat Beat Manifesto - "Storm The Studio R.M.X.S." Tino Corp., September 2003
- Sub Rosa Revisited, a catalog mix. Sub Rosa SR 201, November 2003
- Yoko Ono – "Rising" on "Yes, I'm a Witch" Astralwerks 2007
- Bob Marley - "Mr. Brown" Creation Rebel 2007
- Sagol 59 - "Leeches Remix" JDub Records 2008

== Tracks on compilations, soundtracks and miscellaneous releases ==
- "Galactic Funk" on This is Home Entertainment (Home Entertainment Records/Liquid Sky Music)
- "Hologrammic Dub" on The Night Shift, 1996 (C&S Records)
- "Surface Noise" (Theme of the Hungry Ghost), Sonic Soul Records 001,1996
- "Fourth Inversion" on The Resonance Found at the Core of the Bubble, 1996 (Bubble Core Records)
- "Prologue (The Duchamp Effect)" on Mind The Gap 15 Gonzo Circus GC021, 1997
- "Muzique Mecanique Dub" and "Muzique Psychotique" on Electric Ladyland Vol. 3 (Force X Records).
- "Vorticities" on State Of the Union, 1996 (Atatvistic Records)
- "Step In Stand Clear" on Storm of Drones (Sombient)
- "Temporally Displaced", also on Offbeat
- Collaboration with Amiri Baraka on Black Dada Nihilismus on Offbeat: A Red Hot Sound Trip, 1996, Red Hot/Whitney Museum/Wax Trax-TVT compilation released in conjunction with The Whitney Museum's "The Beats: A Retrospective" installation.
- In Visual Ocean on Gilles Deleuze: In Memoriam (Mille Plateaux Records)
- "The Nasty Data Burst" & "Journey" (Paraspace Mix) on Valis: The Destruction of Syntax (Subharmonic Records)
- "Machinic Phylum" (Crippled Symmetries Mix) on Future Audio, 1996 (Freeze Records)
- "Primary Inversion" on This is Home Entertainment 2, 1996 (Liquid Sky Music/Jungle Sky Records HE 008)
- "Black Djinn Trance" (w/Bill Laswell, Jah Wobble) on War Smash Hits, 1996 (Sub Rosa Records SR 105)
- "Zero Gravity Dub" on Synthetic Pleasures Vol. 2 Caipirinha Productions, 1997
- "Soon Forward, Anansi's Gambit" (DJ Spooky's On the Island of the Lost Souls Mix), and "Why Patterns" on Incursions in Illbient, 1997 (Asphodel 0968)
- "Island Of Lost Souls" on The Freestyle Files, 1997, Studio K7 (Germany)
- The Western Lands (A Dangerous Road Mix) w/ William Burroughs, Bill Laswell, etc. on Material; Seven Souls, 1997, (Triloka/Mercury 314 534 905)
- Iannis Xenakis: Analogiques A + B on Ianissimo! (w/STX Ensemble), 1997 (Vandenburg Wave VAN 0003)
- Iannis Xenakis: Kraanerg (w STX Ensemble), 1997 (Asphodel 0975)
- Discord w/ Ryuichi Sakamoto, David Torn and orchestra. Live in Japan, 1997 (Güt/For Life FLCG 3028)
- "Object Unknown", "Pandemonium", and "Degree Zero Launch" CD-ROM (The Product), 1998
- "Reconstruction and The 6th Degree", 1998 on Electric Ladyland 5 (Mille Plateau 48)
- "He Who Leaves No Trace" for Invisible Soundtracks (Leaf Records)
- "Solar Physics" DJ Spooky and Sir Menelik for Rawkus Records
- "Polymorphia 2000: Ill Konceptual Mix" for Kunsthalle, Vienna
- "Haunted: Ill Konceptual Mix" for Kunsthaus, Zurich
- "Reciprocal Presupposition; Seuqigolana" (Suntropic Inversion Mix) for The End of Utopia (Sub Rosa/SR132), 1998
- "Interlude" DJ Spooky and Vinicius Cantuaria for Onda Sonora (Red Hot and Lisbon)
- "Soon Forward, Synaptic Dissonance" for Asphodelic (Asphodel), 1999
- "Turn Table Eyzd, UMM" for Hi-Fidelity Dub Chapter II (Guidance Recordings GDRC-575), January 2000
- "Conduit 23" for “Wreck This Mess Remission 2” Noise Museum
- "Reciprocal Presupposition and Dance of the Morlocks" on '"Condo Painting'" soundtrack Gallery Six Records, April, 2000
- "Rapper’s Relight" on one:it’s all good, man Saul Goodman records, February 2001
- "Another Forensic Charade" on Electric Ladyland — Clickhop Version 1.0 Mille Plateaux Records, 2001
- "If/When" on Scissors (Play label/Japan; Play 002), June 2001
- "FTP>Bundle / Conduit 23" on An Anthology of Noise & Electronic Music (Sub Rosa/SR 190), April 2002
- "Catechism" (instrumental) (Blue Juice Records/UK) BJCD013, September 2002
- "That Subliminal Kid vs. The Last Mohican" on Thirsty Ear Presents The Blue Series Sampler (The Shape of Jazz to Come) (Thirsty Ear), 2003
- "Strictly Turtableyzed Hmm.." on Hi-Fidelity Dub Sessions (Guidance Recordings), 2004

== Sideman appearances ==
- Arto Lindsay – Mundo Civilizado, 1996, For Life/Ryko/Bar None
- Pilgrimage – 9 Songs of Ecstasy, 1997, Point Music 314 536 201-2/4
- Ben Neill – The Gold Bug, 1998, Antilles Records
- Gary Lucas Golgothaon "Improve the Shining Hour" Knitting Factory, 2000
- Lost Objects w/Bang on a Can, Concerto Köln, RIAS Kammerchor Teldec Classics, Germany 8573-84107-2, May 2001
