= Radio Hades =

Compilation album by Techno Animal
- Released: 21 September 1998
- Genre: Illbient
- Length: 69:23
- Label: Position Chrome
- Producer: Justin Broadrick, Kevin Martin

Techno Animal chronology
Techno Animal Versus Reality (1998)	Radio Hades (1998)	Symbiotics (1999)

Professional ratings
Review scores
Source	Rating
Allmusic	3/5 stars

Radio Hades is a compilation album by the Illbient band Techno Animal, released on 21 September 1998 through Position Chrome. It comprises tracks from various compilation albums which have been edited and remixed for their release here.

NME described the album as "bold experiments from that shadowy borderland between instrumental hip-hop and avant-garde noise" and gave it a 6/10 rating.

== Track listing ==
All tracks are written by Techno Animal

No.	Title	Length
1.	"The Myth/Illogical"	5:33
2.	"Intercranial"	6:39
3.	"Toxicity"	4:48
4.	"Return of the Venom"	6:58
5.	"Interplanetary War Chant"	5:12
6.	"Disciples of Dark"	5:12
7.	"Dread Time Warp"	5:13
8.	"Fistfunk"	3:46
9.	"Beheaded"	3:59
10.	"Needle"	3:28
11.	"Bass Concussion"	5:09
12.	"Ill Sinner"	3:37
13.	"Phantom Tribe"	4:51
14.	"Excavator"	4:31

== Personnel ==
Techno Animal

- Justin Broadrick – production
- Kevin Martin – photography, design, production

Additional musicians and production

- Don Ciccotelli – drums on "Return of the Venom"
- Simon Heyworth – mastering
