= Beth Coleman =

American composer

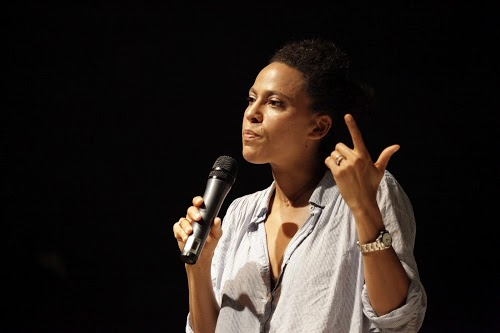
Beth Coleman

Beth Coleman (also known as M. Singe, DJ M. Singe, and DJ Singe) is an American electronic music composer and academic in the field of new media studies. She is an associate professor of data and cities at the Institute of Communication, Culture, Information and Technology (ICCIT) and Faculty of Information at the University of Toronto. Her work has been featured in a variety of venues such as the Whitney Museum of American Art, MoMA PS1, Musée D'art Moderne Paris, and the Waag Society Amsterdam. From 2005 until 2011, she was a professor of Comparative Media Studies and Writing at Massachusetts Institute of Technology. Previously she was an assistant professor in the Department of English Language and Literature at the University of Waterloo, Canada, and co-director of Waterloo's Critical Media Lab.

== Early career ==
Following a trip exploring the burgeoning experimental and electronic music scenes in Berlin in the summer of 1994, Coleman and frequent collaborator Howard Goldkrand returned to New York City, where they formed Soundlab Cultural Alchemy with Paul D. Miller (aka DJ Spooky). SoundLab was formed as a grass roots initiative to provide a space for emerging artists to display new ideas and forms of music and experimental art instillations in response to legal pressures placed on traditional musical venues during the Giuliani administration.

Coleman performed her first solo DJ set with the collective in January 1996. Over her career, Coleman has transitioned from being known primarily as a DJ to being strongly associated with environment installations and new media studies.

== Music ==
Extended experimentation with digital interfaces and audio data manipulation are characteristic of Coleman's musical output, creating what she refers to as an “electronic architecture interface.” Her music is often associated with the illbient music scene of 1990's New York City, a hybrid of ambient, dub, and hip-hop traditions. Over the course of her career, Coleman has shifted from primarily using turntable equipment, a staple of illbient music, to focusing more on audio design software such as Logic. Coleman has stated that she has an aversion towards improvisation in her work, preferring the use of more premeditated, thought-out sound structures.

Coleman is one half of the duo Singe & Verb, a collaboration with her fellow SoundLab co-founder Howard Goldkrand, and has also collaborated with other artists such as Ilhan Ersahin, Lawrence D. Morris, Graham Haynes, and Fredy Studer.

== Academia ==
Coleman has written articles advocating a breakdown of musical and cultural segregation through technology and new art forms, a reflection of the “cultural alchemy” originally introduced in the SoundLab collective.

In 2011, Coleman published her first book, Hello Avatar: Rise of the Networked Generation. In the book, she explores how the boom of social and mobile media and new technologies in the later half of the 2000s has allowed humanity to filter their experiences into a new digital medium, creating an augmented x-reality.

== Selected works ==
In 1999, Coleman and Goldkrand created the piece Mobile Stealth Unit (Pink Noise), a mixed-media sculpture consisting of a workman tricycle and a system of audio electronics. The piece was meant to be an “investigation of space in the form of two-way transmission” through the concept of pink noise.

In 2005, Coleman and Goldkrand created the piece Waken, a full-room installation consisting of six-channel audio mix broadcast through 24 speakers grouped in “flower clusters” designed to replicate the behavior of flower interactions.
