= Edition 1 =

Studio album by King Midas Sound and Fennesz
- Released: 18 September 2015
- Genre: Electronic; ambient; experimental; trip-hop; art pop; dub; drone
- Length: 59:25
- Label: Ninja Tune
- Producer: The Bug

King Midas Sound chronology
Without You (2011)	Edition 1 (2015)	Solitude (2019)

Edition 1 is a collaborative studio album by British crossover project King Midas Sound and Austrian musician Fennesz. It was released on 18 September 2015 through Ninja Tune. It received generally favorable reviews from critics.

== Background ==
King Midas Sound consists of Kevin Martin, Roger Robinson, and Kiki Hitomi. Edition 1 is a collaborative studio album by King Midas Sound and Fennesz. Martin and Fennesz knew each other since the 1990s. The album features "improvised guitar tracks, samples, and unreleased material from Fennesz's archive." They recorded Robinson's part at Martin's studio in Berlin, Hitomi's part in Leipzig, and Fennesz' part in Vienna.

Edition 1 was, upon release, intended to be the first installment in a series of four King Midas Sound albums, each with a different collaborator. However, no further albums have been released by the King Midas Sound project in this series, making it a standalone.

Edition 1 was released on 18 September 2015 through Ninja Tune. It comes with the instrumental version released in conjunction on the digital and CD versions. Edition 1 Instrumentals was later released on its own, on 13 November 2015.

== Critical reception ==
Professional ratings
Aggregate scores
Source	Rating
Metacritic	78/100
Review scores
Source	Rating
AllMusic	4/5 stars
Crack	8/10
Mojo	4/5 stars
Pitchfork	6.7/10
Resident Advisor	3.6/5
Uncut	8/10

According to the review aggregator Metacritic, Edition 1 received "generally favorable reviews" based on a weighted average score of 78 out of 100 from 9 critic scores.

Adam Corner of Crack commented that "Edition 1 is a sprawling, dystopian distillation of King Midas Sound's sub-aquatic sonics and Fennesz' swirling soundscapes, as vocalists Roger Robinson and Kiki Hitomi sprinkle forlorn melodies on to phantom rhythm and bass from the dark side of dub." He added, "for the most part, this engulfing and enigmatic album is a master-class in delicate desolation, and a beautiful merging of two restless electronic innovators." Rory Gibb of The Quietus stated, "compared to Martin's monolithic last couple of albums as The Bug, or the glowering intensity of King Midas Sound's live incarnation of recent years, musically Edition 1 tends towards quiet, reflective gestures."

=== Accolades ===
Year-end lists for Edition 1
Publication	List	Rank	Ref.
Crack	Albums of the Year 2015	62	
The Quietus	The Quietus Albums of 2015	18	
The Wire	The Wire's Top 50 Releases of 2015	31	

== Track listing ==
All tracks are written by Roger Robinson, Kevin Martin, and Christian Fennesz, except where noted.

Edition 1 track listing
No.	Title	Writer(s)	Length
1.	"Mysteries"		4:42
2.	"On My Mind"	Robinson; Kiki Hitomi; Martin; Fennesz	3:32
3.	"Waves"		7:24
4.	"Loving or Leaving"		5:48
5.	"Melt"	Robinson; Martin	5:10
6.	"Lighthouse"		5:03
7.	"Above Water"	Martin; Fennesz	13:53
8.	"We Walk Together"	Robinson; Hitomi; Martin; Fennesz	5:41
9.	"Our Love"		8:07
Total length:			59:25

== Personnel ==
Credits adapted from liner notes.

- The Bug – production, mixing
- Stefan Betke – mastering
- Optigram – artwork
- Jimmy Mould – photography

== Charts ==
Chart performance for Edition 1
Chart (2015)	Peak position
UK Official Record Store (OCC)	22
