= Techno Animal Versus Reality =

Studio album and Remix album by Techno Animal
- Released: 30 March 1998
- Genre: Illbient
- Length: 60:51
- Label: City Slang
- Producer: Justin Broadrick, Kevin Martin

Techno Animal chronology
| Re-Entry (1995) | Techno Animal Versus Reality (1998) | Radio Hades (1998) |

Professional ratings
Review scores
| Source | Rating |
|---|---|
| Allmusic | 4/5 stars |

Techno Animal Versus Reality is a remix album by the Illbient band Techno Animal, released on 30 March 1998 through City Slang.

== Track listing ==
| No. | Title | Remixer | Length |
|---|---|---|---|
| 1. | "Demonoid" | | 6:49 |
| 2. | "Demonoid" (remix) | Porter Ricks | 6:30 |
| 3. | "Deceleration" | | 5:35 |
| 4. | "Deceleration" (remix) | Ui | 3:43 |
| 5. | "Baka" | | 8:31 |
| 6. | "Baka" (remix) | Spectre | 6:08 |
| 7. | "Bionic Beatbox" | | 6:33 |
| 8. | "Bionic Beatbox" (remix) | Tortoise | 5:18 |
| 9. | "Atomic Buddha" | | 6:00 |
| 10. | "Atomic Buddha" (remix) | Alec Empire | 5:44 |

== Personnel ==
Techno Animal

- Justin Broadrick – production
- Kevin Martin – photography, design, production

Additional musicians and production

- Simon Heyworth – mastering
