= Re-Entry (Techno Animal album) =

Studio album by Techno Animal
- Released: 20 June 1995
- Genre: Illbient, ambient, experimental
- Length: 148:31
- Label: Virgin
- Producer: Justin Broadrick and Kevin Martin

Techno Animal chronology
Ghosts (1991)	Re-Entry (1995)	Techno Animal Versus Reality (1998)

2023 Reissue cover art

Professional ratings
Review scores
Source	Rating
Allmusic	4/5 stars

Re-Entry is the second album by the illbient band Techno Animal, released on 20 June 1995 through Virgin Records. It was reissued by Relapse Records in 2023.

== Track listing ==
All tracks are written by Justin Broadrick and Kevin Martin, except "Flight of the Hermaphrodite" and "Needle Park" co-written by Jon Hassell

Disc one: Dream Machinery
No.	Title	Length
1.	"Flight of the Hermaphrodite"	10:56
2.	"The Mighty Atom Smasher"	10:04
3.	"Mastodon Americanus"	7:23
4.	"City Heathen Dub"	10:04
5.	"Narco Agent vs. The Medicine Man"	14:00
6.	"Demodex Invasion"	19:14
Total length:		71:44

Disc two: Heavy Lids
No.	Title	Length
1.	"Evil Spirits/Angel Dust"	9:45
2.	"Catatonia"	15:44
3.	"Needle Park"	10:41
4.	"Red Sea"	11:20
5.	"Cape Canaveral"	21:28
6.	"Resuscitator"	7:46
Total length:		76:47 148:31

== Personnel ==
Techno Animal

- Justin Broadrick – production
- Kevin Martin – production

Additional musicians and production

- Damian Bennette – bass guitar on "Cape Canaveral"
- Kingsuk Biswas – synthesizer on "Narco Agent vs. The Medicine Man"
- Dave Cochrane – bass guitar on "Needle Park"
- Tony Cousins – mastering
- Jon Hassell – trumpet on "Flight of the Hermaphrodite" and "Needle Park"
- The Pathological Puppy – illustrations, design
- Tom Prentice – viola on "Demodex Invasion"
