= Soundlab =

Coordinates: 40.75342°N 73.97074°W

Soundlab was a collective of artists, both sound and visual, that started in the East Village, New York City around the mid 1990s. The founding members were Howard Goldkrand, Beth Coleman and Paul D. Miller a.k.a. DJ Spooky. The collective included many musicians and artists from the Illbient scene including DJ Olive, Lloop, Dj Wally, A.K. Atoms, Kit Krash, Acoustyk a.k.a. MegMan, Lucy Walker and Tim Sweet.

The initial Soundlab events took place at David Linton's House of Ouch in Chinatown and then moving around to secret venues around the city including participation in The RV's Substation massive at Andy Warhol's old Factory space (being the last event ever held there).

Bands such as We, Byzar and Subdub were regular performers as well as Arto Lindsay, Vernon Reid, DJ Soulslinger, the Freight Elevator Quartet and Elliott Sharp.

Beth Coleman and Howard Goldkrand contributed a chapter to Sound Unbound: Sampling Digital Music and Culture (The MIT Press, 2008) edited by Paul D. Miller a.k.a. DJ Spooky.
