= Raz Mesinai =

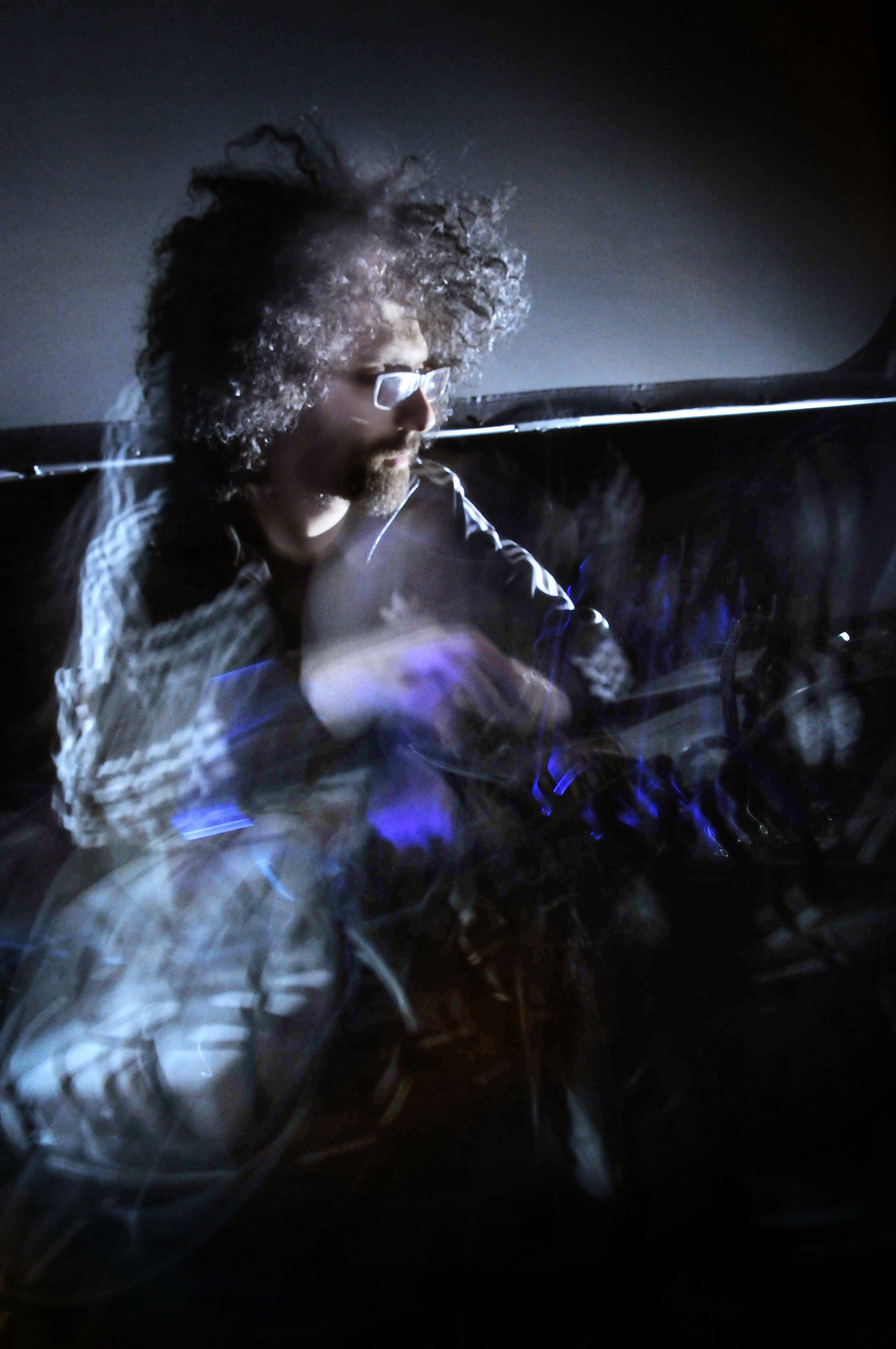
- Mesinai in 2008

Background information
- Also known as: Badawi, Ghost Producer, X-On, Psy Co., LadyMan, Sub Dub, The Heretic Of Ether
- Born: Reuel Emanuel Mesinai; 1973 (age 52–53)
- Genres: Illbient; ambient dub; dub; world
- Occupations: Producer, musician, composer, educator
- Instruments: Electronics, piano, percussion
- Years active: 1989-present
- Labels: Underground Producers Alliance, Asphodel, ROIR
- Website: www.upa.nyc

Reuel Emanuel “Raz” Mesinai (born 1973) is an American record producer, musician, composer, artist, writer and educator from New York City. He has released recordings since 1989 under the monikers Badawi, Sub Dub, Ghost Producer, Psy Co., and Raz Mesinai and is the founder of the "Underground Producers Alliance", an artist development agency in New York City co-founded by Scott Harding.

== Biography ==
Mesinai began experimenting with cassettes and sampling at the age of 10, and at 14, was discovered by musician Juma Sultan while creating music for breakdancers on the streets of New York City. Juma gave him a Multi-Vox Tape Echo machine and a ribbon microphone to produce his early work.

In the early 1990s, Mesinai formed the group Sub Dub with John Ward. The group is credited as an integral part of the founding of the illbient genre.

His 2001 album, The Unspeakable, featured unreleased music that he composed for the Hellraiser 6 soundtrack. The material was rejected after being considered "too scary for the movie".

The Wire described Mesinai's Soldier of Midian (2001) as "explod[ing] with Middle Eastern percussion, Persian horn samples and dulcimer licks played by an ensemble of genuine Middle Eastern musicians, then cut up with a major dose of studio tricnology."

Mesinai's album Badawi: The Heretic of Ether (1999), was used as the template for the score to the blockbuster film, Black Hawk Down. This experience led him to coin the term "Score Design" and led to work creating music for major motion pictures, including The Fountain, Black Swan, The Wrestler, and A Late Quartet.

Mesinai has described Score Design as "conceptualiz[ing] scores that are not calling for the traditional musical score that composers and musicians are used to...It's similar to sound design, where you create the atmosphere and develop sounds, hopefully from scratch, to implement the overall atmosphere and concept of the film."

In 2004, Mesinai was awarded the Sundance Composers Lab Fellowship, where he worked on scores for Sundance Directors.

In 2016, Mesinai released a collaborative film that he directed and scored with Jonathan Uliel Saldanha, titled Tunnel Vision. The film and its music explores subterranean frequencies and was recorded in tunnels and caves, and mixed as a dub record. Tunnel Vision explores a narrative format created by Mesinai called "Dub Fiction," or "a form of storytelling utilizing various mediums of modern technology to create elastic narratives which can be manipulated and, essentially, remixed by others."

Mesinai has taught master classes in music production, sound design and film scoring at UCSD, The New School, Dub Spot, and NYU. He founded the Underground Producers Alliance (UPA) and now teaches for the school exclusively.

Mesinai has received commissions from The Lincoln Center Festival, Carnegie Hall, Kronos Quartet, Ethel, and The Kitchen and has officially remixed artists such as Burning Spear, Shackleton, and Arto Lindsay.

In addition to his musical output, Mesinai draws and writes comic books including issues for Marvel, as well as album artwork for artists such as Kode9 and The Spaceape.

In 2015, Mesinai founded the artist development organization the "Underground Producers Alliance", also acting as a school for teaching extended techniques in music production and sound design to professionals, along with co founders producers Scotty Hard (Jungle Brothers, New Kingdom), Prince Paul (De La Soul), Honeychild Coleman (The Slit)) and HPrizm (Anti Pop Consortium).

== Discography ==
As Raz Mesinai

- The Unspeakable (2001)
- Before the Law (2001)
- Resurrections for Goatskin (2003)
- Cyborg Acoustics (2004)
- Death Notes vol.1 (2018)
- Death Notes vol.2 (2018)

As Badawi

- Bedouin Sound Clash (1996)
- Jerusalem Under Fire (1997)
- The Heretic of Ether (1999)
- Soldier of Midian (2001)
- Clones & False Prophets (2003)
- Safe (2006)
- Unit of Resistance (2007)

As Sub Dub

- Babylon Unite (EP) 1994
- Dawazangpo (EP) 1995
- Sub Dub (1996)
- Dancehall Malfunction (1997)
- Sub Dub Original Masters (2001)
