= Symbiotics (album) =

Studio album by Porter Ricks : Techno Animal
- Released: 2 November 1999
- Genre: Illbient
- Length: 58:39
- Label: Force Inc. Music Works
- Producer: Justin Broadrick, Thomas Köner, Kevin Martin, Andy Mellwig

Techno Animal chronology
Radio Hades (1998)	Symbiotics (1999)	The Brotherhood of the Bomb (2001)

Professional ratings
Review scores
Source	Rating
Allmusic	4.5/5 stars
Alternative Press	5/5 stars

Symbiotics is a collaborative album by Porter Ricks and Techno Animal, released on 2 November 1999 through Force Inc. Music Works.

== Track listing ==
No.	Title	Writer(s)	Length
1.	"Polytoxic 1"	Thomas Köner, Andy Mellwig	4:49
2.	"Hydrozoid"	Justin Broadrick, Kevin Martin	5:56
3.	"Polytoxic 2"	Thomas Köner, Andy Mellwig	6:18
4.	"Bio-Morphium"	Justin Broadrick, Kevin Martin	6:07
5.	"Phosphoric"	Thomas Köner, Andy Mellwig	8:53
6.	"Anthrazite"	Justin Broadrick, Kevin Martin	7:55
7.	"Ionic"	Thomas Köner, Andy Mellwig	12:56
8.	"Monosphate"	Justin Broadrick, Kevin Martin	5:45

== Personnel ==
Musicians

- Justin Broadrick – production
- Thomas Köner – production
- Kevin Martin – photography, design, production
- Andy Mellwig – production

Additional musicians and production

- Magus Designs – photography, design
