= Fire (The Bug album) =

2021 album by The Bug

Studio album by The Bug
- Released: 27 August 2021
- Length: 51:52
- Label: Ninja Tune

The Bug chronology
Angels & Devils (2014)	Fire (2021)

Fire is a studio album by Kevin Martin under his alias The Bug. It was released on Ninja Tune on 27 August 2021.

== Critical reception ==
Professional ratings
Aggregate scores
Source	Rating
Metacritic	85/100
Review scores
Source	Rating
AllMusic	4/5 stars
Clash	8/10
Pitchfork	8.0/10
PopMatters	9/10

At Metacritic, which assigns a weighted average score out of 100 to reviews from mainstream critics, the album received an average score of 85, based on 9 reviews, indicating "universal acclaim".

Tom Morgan, in PopMatters, describes Fire's "tone" as one of "pure, scorching heat", and observes that it treats of themes including climate change and sociopolitical tensions. Morgan argues that Fire is Martin's "finest" as The Bug.

In Le Devoir, giving the album four stars, Philippe Renaud notes that the elements of grime, dancehall, and electronic music in Fire "add fuel to the fire" of Martin's "indignation". JR Moores, in The Quietus, describes Fire as "like a direct sequel" to London Zoo (2008).

The Quietus subsequently voted Fire as number 1 in their 100 favourite albums of 2021.

== Track listing ==
No.	Title	Length
1.	"The Fourth Day" (featuring Roger Robinson)	1:59
2.	"Pressure" (featuring Flowdan)	3:48
3.	"Demon" (featuring Irah)	3:48
4.	"Vexed" (featuring Moor Mother)	3:52
5.	"Clash" (featuring Logan)	3:07
6.	"War" (featuring Nazamba)	4:38
7.	"How Bout Dat" (featuring FFSYTHO)	3:47
8.	"Bang" (featuring Manga Saint Hilare)	3:03
9.	"Hammer" (featuring Flowdan)	3:26
10.	"Ganja Baby" (featuring Daddy Freddy)	3:16
11.	"Fuck Off" (featuring Logan)	3:27
12.	"Bomb" (featuring Flowdan)	4:46
13.	"High Rise" (featuring Manga Saint Hilare)	4:22
14.	"The Missing" (featuring Roger Robinson)	4:33
Total length:		51:52
