= Tippa Irie =

British reggae musician (born 1965)

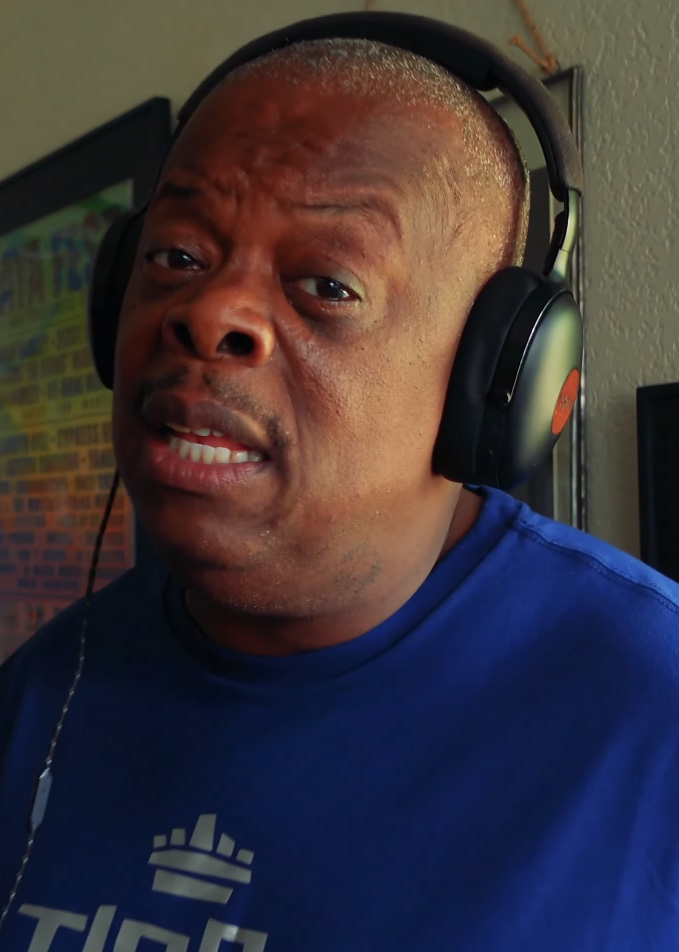
- Irie in 2023

Background information
- Born: Anthony Henry; June 7, 1965 (age 61); London, England
- Origin: Brixton, South London
- Genres: Reggae
- Years active: 1980 - present
- Website: www.tippairie.com

Tippa Irie (born Anthony Henry, 7 June 1965, London, England) is a British reggae singer and DJ from Brixton, South London. He first came to prominence in the early 1980s as an MC on the South London reggae soundsystem Saxon Studio International.

He first achieved national exposure on night-time BBC Radio 1 in the mid-1980s, with the singles "It's Good To Have The Feeling You're The Best" and "Complain Neighbour" (on Greensleeves Records), before achieving a UK Top 40 hit in 1986 with "Hello Darling".

He has collaborated with Alexander O'Neal, Long Beach Dub All Stars, The Skints, and Chali 2na. He enjoyed further success in 2003, when he appeared on The Black Eyed Peas' track "Hey Mama". He has also collaborated with the London-based avant-dancehall outfit The Bug, on the single "Angry" from the album London Zoo.

In 2010, he appeared on the BBC Television panel show Never Mind the Buzzcocks, in the identity parade round. His latest release is Stick to My Roots (2010). ln 2023 he released his autobiography under the same title.

== UK singles chart discography ==
- "Hello Darling" – (1986) – Number 22
- "Heartbeat" – (1986) – Number 59
- "Shouting for the Gunners" – (1993) – Number 34
- "Staying Alive 95" – (1995) – Number 48*
