= Black Sun (Kode9 & the Spaceape album) =

Studio album by Kode9 & the Spaceape
- Released: 18 April 2011
- Genre: UK bass
- Length: 45:42
- Label: Hyperdub
- Producer: S. Goodman

Kode9 & the Spaceape chronology
Memories of the Future (2006)	Black Sun (2011)	Killing Season (2014)

Singles from Black Sun
- 1. "Black Sun" Released: 2009; 2. "Otherman" / "Love Is the Drug" Released: 2011

Black Sun is the second and final collaborative studio album by Kode9 & the Spaceape. It was released on 18 April 2011 through Kode9's record label Hyperdub. It received generally favorable reviews from critics.

== Background ==
Black Sun is Kode9 & the Spaceape's second collaborative studio album, following Memories of the Future (2006). Kode9 took a sabbatical from teaching at the University of East London. In a 2011 interview, the Spaceape cited his recent reading of "classic" writers H. G. Wells and George Orwell, as well as the film directors David Cronenberg, Michael Haneke, Alfred Hitchcock, and Akira Kurosawa, as the influences on the album.

Black Sun includes contributions from Cha Cha and Flying Lotus. The album's cover art is designed by Optigram. The album comes with illustrations by Raz Mesinai that visualize the album's story.

The Spaceape died on 2 October 2014, and Black Sun became their final collaborative studio album.

== Critical reception ==
Professional ratings
Aggregate scores
Source	Rating
Metacritic	80/100
Review scores
Source	Rating
The A.V. Club	B+
Fact	3.5/5 stars
The Guardian	3/5 stars
MusicOMH	4/5 stars
Pitchfork	7.7/10
Resident Advisor	4/5
The Skinny	5/5 stars
Tiny Mix Tapes	4/5 stars

According to the review aggregator Metacritic, Black Sun received "generally favorable reviews" based on a weighted average score of 80 out of 100 from 12 critic scores.

Alex Macpherson of The Guardian stated, "while 2006's Memories of the Future captured the nocturnal smokiness of traditional dubstep, Black Sun is more about richly textured, pitch-shifting synths and spidery rhythmic workouts." He added, "It's often engaging, but the way it discomfits is rather expected, a well-worn sonic language of alienation and dystopia." Nate Patrin of Pitchfork commented that "instead of sinking into a single-minded atmosphere of futurist foreboding, the music is more sprightly and intricate," adding that "tension and anxiety don't always have to be cavernous and austere, and Black Sun reveals a way for dubstep's vanguard to express their more ominous impulses in a way you can still dance to." Michaelangelo Matos of The A.V. Club stated, "In spite of its sprawling palette, Black Sun is tight and compact, an album rather than simply a showcase."

=== Accolades ===
Year-end lists for Black Sun
Publication	List	Rank	Ref.
Fact	The 50 Best Albums of 2011	34	
Rough Trade	Top 100 Albums of 2011	89	

== Track listing ==
All lyrics are written by S. Gordon; all music is composed by S. Goodman.

Black Sun track listing
No.	Title	Length
1.	"Black Smoke" (featuring Cha Cha)	4:51
2.	"Promises"	3:33
3.	"Am I"	3:40
4.	"Love Is the Drug" (featuring Cha Cha)	2:59
5.	"Neon Red Sign" (featuring Cha Cha)	3:17
6.	"The Cure" (featuring Cha Cha)	3:46
7.	"Black Sun" (partial eclipse version)	5:28
8.	"Hole in the Sky"	2:16
9.	"Otherman"	4:23
10.	"Green Sun"	4:33
11.	"Bullet Against Bone"	3:48
12.	"Kryon" (featuring Flying Lotus)	3:06
Total length:		45:42

== Personnel ==
Credits adapted from liner notes.

- S. Goodman – production
- S. Gordon – vocals
- Cha Cha – additional vocals (1, 4–6)
- Flying Lotus – additional production (12)
- Optigram – cover art
- Raz Mesinai – Black Sun story illustration

== Charts ==
Chart performance for Black Sun
Chart (2011)	Peak position
UK Dance Albums (OCC)	35
UK Independent Albums (OCC)	38
