= The Brotherhood of the Bomb =

Studio album by Techno Animal
- Released: 11 September 2001
- Genre: Illbient; industrial hip-hop; experimental hip-hop
- Length: 61:07
- Label: Matador
- Producer: Justin Broadrick; Kevin Martin

Techno Animal chronology
Symbiotics (1999)	The Brotherhood of the Bomb (2001)

Professional ratings
Review scores
Source	Rating
AllMusic	4/5 stars
Alternative Press	4/5 stars
Daily Nexus	Mixed
Drowned in Sound	9/10
PopMatters	Favorable
Stylus Magazine	B

The Brotherhood of the Bomb is the fourth album by the illbient band Techno Animal, released on 11 September 2001 by Matador Records. It was reissued by Relapse Records in 2023.

While earlier Techno Animal recordings had been largely instrumental, Brotherhood of the Bomb features vocals from underground hip-hop artists.

== Track listing ==
All music is composed by Techno Animal.

No.	Title	Lyrics/Vocals	Length
1.	"Cruise Mode 101"	Rubberoom	4:48
2.	"Glass Prism Enclosure"	Beans, High Priest, M. Sayyid	4:23
3.	"Hypertension"		6:14
4.	"DC-10"	Rob Sonic	4:33
5.	"Robosapien"		5:45
6.	"Freefall"		5:03
7.	"Monoscopic"		5:54
8.	"Piranha"	Toastie Taylor	4:58
9.	"Sub Species"		4:18
10.	"We Can Build You"	El-P, Vast Aire	4:16
11.	"Blood Money"		5:22
12.	"Hell"	dälek	5:33
Total length:			61:07

== Personnel ==
Credits adapted from The Brotherhood of the Bomb liner notes

Techno Animal

- Justin Broadrick (credited as JK Flesh) – production
- Kevin Martin (credited as The Bug) – photography, design, production

Additional musicians

- Rubberoom – vocals (track 1)
- Antipop Consortium – vocals (track 2)
- Rob Sonic – vocals (track 4)
- Fred Ones – scratches (track 4)
- Toastie Taylor – vocals (track 8)
- El-P – vocals (track 10)
- Vast Aire – vocals (track 10)
- dälek – vocals (track 12)

Technical personnel

- Simon Heyworth – mastering
- Magus Designs – photography, design
