= Curse of the Golden Vampire =

1998 Studio Album

- Also known as: The Curse of the Golden Vampire
- Genres: Electronic; digital hardcore
- Years active: 1998–2003
- Labels: Digital Hardcore Recordings; Ipecac Recordings
- Past members: Alec Empire; Kevin Martin; Justin Broadrick

Curse of the Golden Vampire was a collaborative music project of Alec Empire and Techno Animal (Kevin Martin and Justin Broadrick). The group released a studio album, titled The Curse of the Golden Vampire, on Digital Hardcore Recordings in 1998. Without the participation of Empire, the group released a studio album, titled Mass Destruction, on Ipecac Recordings in 2003.

== Discography ==
=== Studio albums ===
- The Curse of the Golden Vampire (1998)
- Mass Destruction (2003)

== The Curse of the Golden Vampire ==
The Curse of the Golden Vampire

Studio album by The Curse of the Golden Vampire
- Released: 1998
- Genres: Electronic; digital hardcore
- Length: 59:24
- Label: Digital Hardcore Recordings
- Producer: Techno Animal

The Curse of the Golden Vampire chronology
The Curse of the Golden Vampire (1998)	Mass Destruction (2003)

The Curse of the Golden Vampire is the first studio album by The Curse of the Golden Vampire. It was released on Digital Hardcore Recordings in 1998.

=== Critical reception ===
Professional ratings
Review scores
Source	Rating
AllMusic	2.5/5 stars

John Bush of AllMusic called the album "a distinct disappointment." He added, "The Curse of the Golden Vampire takes each act's trademark -- industrial breakbeats and darkside dub soundscapes, respectively -- and merely blends them together, resulting in a project which sounds as though separate studios were used for recording."

=== Track listing ===
All tracks are written by Alec Empire and Techno Animal.

No.	Title	Length
1.	"Caucasian Deathmask"	7:58
2.	"Escape the Earth"	7:45
3.	"Substance X"	5:28
4.	"Low-Tech Predator"	7:02
5.	"Anti-Matter"	7:54
6.	"Kamikaze Space Programme"	7:50
7.	"Temple of the Yellow Snake"	5:55
8.	"Ultrasonic Meltdown"	9:32
Total length:		59:24

=== Personnel ===
Credits adapted from liner notes.

- Alec Empire – music
- Techno Animal – additional music, production
- Beans – vocals (3)
- Steve Rooke – mastering
- Hell – cover art
- The Pathological Puppy – cover art
