= We (illbient group) =

American hip-hop band

We™
- Origin: Williamsburg, Brooklyn, New York, USA
- Genres: Electronica, trip hop, illbient, alternative dance
- Years active: 1991–2001
- Labels: Asphodel, Home Entertainment, Liquid Sky
- Members: Gregor Asch; Rich Panciera; Ignacio Platas

We™ was an illbient production and DJ collective that was formed in Williamsburg, Brooklyn in 1991 by DJ Olive aka Gregor Asch, Lloop aka Rich Panciera and Once 11 aka Nacho aka Ignacio Platas. They have released music on Asphodel Records alongside DJ Spooky, Byzar and Sub Dub. They are now associated with the Agriculture Records label. We™ have remixed tracks for Arto Lindsay, Free Kitten, and Medeski, Martin, and Wood among others.

== As Is (1997) ==
As Is

Studio album by We™
- Released: 1997
- Recorded: November – December 1996
- Length: 70:25
- Label: Asphodel

Professional ratings
Review scores
Source	Rating
AllMusic	4/5 stars

No.	Title	Length
1.	"Magnesium Flares"	7:00
2.	"Ease-In"	4:50
3.	"Believe Porpoise"	5:04
4.	"Dyed Camel Skins"	9:28
5.	"Flutesque"	4:38
6.	"In Time"	5:36
7.	"Violinstoid"	0:54
8.	"3/10th of the Population"	6:46
9.	"Shape Wipe"	2:45
10.	"Lillie"	5:22
11.	"Tombs & Tombs Only"	5:56
12.	"New Agent"	7:44
13.	"SS/Sadness-88"	4:22

== The Square Root of Negative One (1999) ==
The Square Root of Negative One

Studio album by We™
- Released: 1999
- Genres: Trip hop, experimental electronic, illbient, experimental hip-hop
- Length: 66:39
- Label: Asphodel

Professional ratings
Review scores
Source	Rating
AllMusic	3/5 stars

No.	Title	Length
1.	"Birimbau"	3:48
2.	"12_Diablos"	6:34
3.	"Caya's Kids"	5:29
4.	"Modulana"	3:45
5.	"Back and Forth"	6:38
6.	"Ririka"	7:13
7.	"Thonk"	0:58
8.	"Mosquito"	6:25
9.	"'You Gone?"	4:36
10.	"Hielo"	4:07
11.	"Protons"	6:05
12.	"Intimines"	4:01
13.	"12_Diablos_Mix13"	4:44
14.	"Uabmirib"	2:16

== Decentertainment (2000) ==
Decentertainment

Studio album by We™
- Released: 2000
- Genres: Trip hop, experimental electronic, illbient, experimental hip-hop, instrumental hip-hop
- Length: 68:32
- Labels: Home Entertainment, Liquid Sky

Professional ratings
Review scores
Source	Rating
AllMusic	4.5/5 stars

No.	Title	Length
1.	"Hang On"	6:46
2.	"Afrique"	5:26
3.	"Micro Al Hammed"	3:20
4.	"Out For Now"	6:19
5.	"If They See"	8:35
6.	"Granular Timor Time"	3:22
7.	"Pull"	7:20
8.	"Latex=Porex"	2:47
9.	"Rain In Spain"	5:07
10.	"Hello World"	2:17
11.	"Vulpecula"	7:17
12.	"One Personal Dream"	3:07
13.	"Burn Up In Half"	3:31
14.	"Polynesian Inventor"	3:19
