= Proc Fiskal =

Scottish electronic artist and DJ

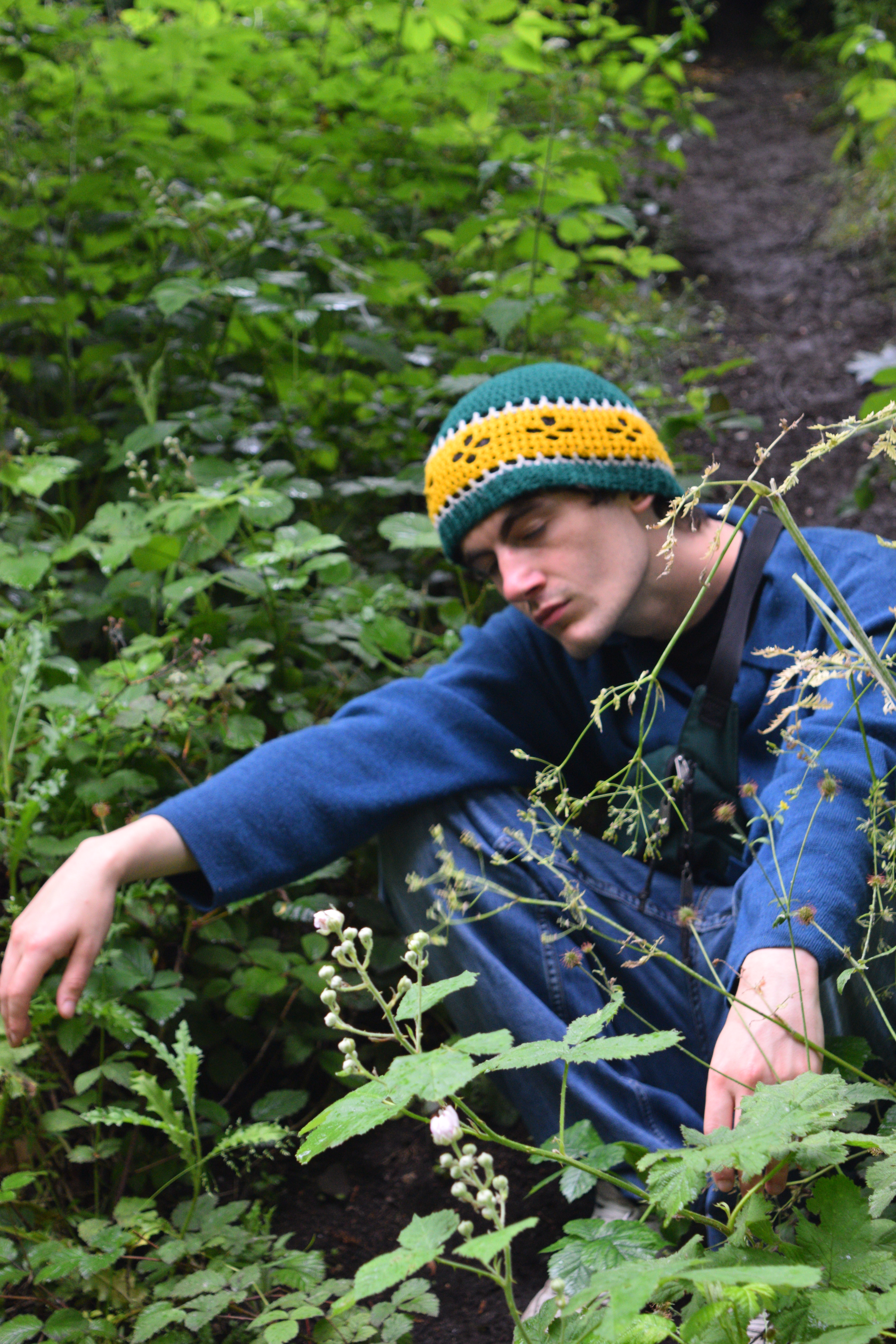
- Powers in 2021

Background information
- Born: Joseph Powers; 1997 (age 28–29)
- Origin: Edinburgh, Scotland, United Kingdom
- Genres: Electronic, grime, IDM
- Occupations: Music producer, DJ
- Labels: Hyperdub, Shleekit Doss
- Website: procfiskal.bandcamp.com

Joe Powers (born 1997) is a Scottish electronic artist and DJ, who works under the name Proc Fiskal. He is known for his experimental style that mixes electronic music with grime and Gaelic Folk. After several years of releasing songs on Soundcloud he was signed to the Hyperdub label before releasing the EP The Highland Mob (2017) and his debut album Insula (2018). Powers has gone on to release the album Siren Spine Sysex (2021) and Canticle Hardposte (2025) with the latter being released on his own label Shleekit Doss which takes its name from his long-running Edinburgh club night.

== Life and career ==
Joe Powers was born in 1997, and grew up in Pilton, Edinburgh. As a teenager, he began experimenting with grime sample packs and sampling from YouTube. He started working with DJs Rapture 4D and Polonis at LVLS Radio in Glasgow becoming heavily involved in the Scottish grime scene. At 19, Powers was signed to Kode9's record label Hyperdub and released his debut EP The Highland Mob and debut album Insula the following year.

In 2021, Powers released the album Siren Spine Sysex for which he was shortlisted for the Scottish Album of the Year Award. The album was described by Beggars Banquet Records as "blended grime and 90s synths with Gaelic folk as a commentary on the tourist industry’s commodification of Scottishness".

For the release of EP Canticle Hardposte, in 2025, Powers collaborated with filmmaker Finn Dove to create a music video for the lead single uHazsh this time on his own label Shleekit Doss. He opened for A.G. Cook at The Roundhouse in London and won Best Electronic artist at the Scottish Alternative Music Awards the same year.

In 2026, Powers returned to Hyperdub to drop the EP Exchequer for which he worked with Dove again to create a music video for the track Disease Again.

== Discography ==
Albums

- Insula (2018, Hyperdub)
- Siren Spine Sysex (2021, Hyperdub)
- Canticle Hardposte (2025, Shleekit Doss)

EPs

- The Highland Mob (2017, Hyperdub)
- Hello Boss (2018, Cosmic Bridge)
- Shleekit Doss (2019, Hyperdub)
- Lothian Buses (2021, Hyperdub)
- Rt Hon (2023, Hyperdub)
- Exchequer (2026, Hyperdub)

Singles

- Skulka (2017, Hyperdub)
- Dish Washing (2018, Hyperdub)
- Soundwise (2018, Hyperdub)
- Prop O Deed (2019, Hyperdub)
- Football (2020, Edina St.)
- Thurs Jung Yout (2021, Hyperdub)
- Leith Tornn Carnal (2021, Hyperdub)
- Humancargoe Estt (2021, Hyperdub)
- Pic Of U (2023, Hyperdub)
- ADDICTIONZ (2026, Shleekit Doss)
