= Ghosts (Techno Animal album) =

Studio album by Techno Animal
- Released: 1991
- Genres: Industrial, experimental
- Length: 72:01
- Label: Pathological
- Producer: Justin Broadrick

Techno Animal chronology
Ghosts (1991)	Re-Entry (1995)

Ghosts is the debut album of the Illbient band Techno Animal, released on Pathological Records in 1991.

== Reception ==
Professional ratings
Review scores
Source	Rating
AllMusic	3/5 stars

Simon Reynolds, in reviewing the album for Melody Maker, said, "Ghosts isn't quite the long-awaited breakthrough, the one that makes the Young Gods seem ancient, but it's a brave stab in the right direction."

== Track listing ==
All tracks are written by Techno Animal.

No.	Title	Length
1.	"Burn"	2:57
2.	"Walk Then Crawl"	11:41
3.	"White Dog"	4:07
4.	"Freak Fucker"	3:47
5.	"The Dream Forger"	7:56
6.	"Tough Cop/Soft Cop"	11:29
7.	"God vs. Flesh"	23:21
8.	"Spineless"	6:47

== Personnel ==
- Justin Broadrick – production, programming
- Kevin Martin – instruments, vocals
