= Solitude (King Midas Sound album) =

Studio album by King Midas Sound
- Released: 14 February 2019
- Genre: Drone; spoken word
- Length: 60:01
- Label: Cosmo Rhythmatic
- Producer: Kevin Richard Martin

King Midas Sound chronology
Edition 1 (2015)	Solitude (2019)

Singles from Solitude
- 1. "You Disappear" Released: 29 January 2019

Solitude is a studio album by King Midas Sound, a British musical project of producer Kevin Martin and vocalist Roger Robinson. It was released on 14 February 2019 through Cosmo Rhythmatic. It received universal acclaim from critics.

== Background ==
The album is almost entirely beatless, and the lyrics explore isolation, loneliness, regret and resentment. According to Martin and Robinson, it was recorded in a fraught period, but the lyrics are not autobiographical. The album's cover art features a photograph taken by Daisuke Yokota.

== Critical reception ==
Professional ratings
Aggregate scores
Source	Rating
Metacritic	85/100
Review scores
Source	Rating
The Line of Best Fit	9/10
Pitchfork	7.8/10
Resident Advisor	4.3/5

According to the review aggregator Metacritic, Solitude received "universal acclaim" based on a weighted average score of 85 out of 100 from 5 critic scores.

Theo Korz for The Line of Best Fit wrote that "Solitude is not an easy record to enjoy – even in writing this review I was reluctant to return to it", but that the album was "brilliant and awful", while Louis Pattison for Pitchfork wrote that "Solitude is the sort of record it's hard to recommend wholeheartedly", saying it's "too severe, too unrelenting".

=== Accolades ===
Year-end lists for Solitude
Publication	List	Rank	Ref.
The Quietus	Quietus Albums of the Year 2019	81	
The Wire	The Wire's Top 50 Releases 2019	28	

== Track listing ==
All tracks are written by R. Robinson and K. Martin.

Solitude track listing
No.	Title	Length
1.	"You Disappear"	6:25
2.	"Zeros"	3:17
3.	"In the Night"	5:51
4.	"Too Late"	3:49
5.	"Alone"	4:38
6.	"Who"	5:40
7.	"Lies"	5:28
8.	"The Lonely"	5:25
9.	"Bluebird (After Bukowski)"	4:55
10.	"Missing You"	4:00
11.	"Her Body"	5:08
12.	"X"	5:25
Total length:		60:01

== Personnel ==
Credits adapted from liner notes.

- Roger Robinson – vocals
- Kevin Richard Martin – production
- Stefan Betke – mastering
- Daisuke Yokota – cover photography
