= Songs of a Dead Dreamer (album) =

Studio album by DJ Spooky
- Released: April 2, 1996
- Genre: Illbient, trip hop
- Length: 73:23
- Label: Asphodel
- Producer: Paul D. Miller

DJ Spooky chronology
Songs of a Dead Dreamer (1996)	Synthetic Fury EP (1998)

Songs of a Dead Dreamer is the debut studio album by DJ Spooky. It was released through Asphodel Records on April 2, 1996.

== Critical reception ==
Professional ratings
Review scores
Source	Rating
AllMusic	4.5/5 stars
Alternative Press	4/5
Muzik	3/5 stars
The Village Voice	(choice cut)

The New York Times wrote that "the sounds are swathed in reverberation or veiled by distortion; distant rumbles and swooshes compete for the foreground with drumbeats and bass lines, hovering chords and metallic clatter."

In 2015, Fact placed it at number 10 on the "50 Best Trip-Hop Albums of All Time" list.

== Track listing ==
No.	Title	Length
1.	"Intro"	1:02
2.	"The Vengeance of Galaxy 5"	1:12
3.	"Phase Interlude"	3:23
4.	"Galactic Funk (Tau Ceti Mix)"	6:48
5.	"Hologrammic Dub"	7:05
6.	"Dance of the Morlocks"	1:00
7.	"Juba"	5:24
8.	"Thoughts Like Rain"	5:41
9.	"Anansi Abstrakt"	11:35
10.	"Grapheme"	10:52
11.	"Phase Interlude Pt. 2"	1:06
12.	"Nihilismus Dub"	4:13
13.	"The Terran Invasion of Alpha Centauri Year 2794"	6:32
14.	"Time Out of Joint"	1:06
15.	"High Density"	6:31
16.	"Outtro"	0:20

== Personnel ==
Credits adapted from liner notes.

- Nikolas van Egten – writing, production
- Paul D. Miller – production, promotion
- Arto Lindsay – guitar (on "Dance of the Morlocks")
- Mica – saxophone (on "Nihilismus Dub")
