= Angels & Devils (The Bug album) =

Studio album by The Bug
- Released: 26 August 2014
- Genre: Electronic
- Length: 47:17
- Label: Ninja Tune

The Bug chronology
London Zoo (2008)	Angels & Devils (2014)	Fire (2021)

Angels & Devils is the fourth studio album by English musician Kevin Martin under his alias The Bug. It was released in August 2014 under Ninja Tune. It peaked at number 50 on the Billboard Heatseekers Albums chart.

== Critical reception ==
Professional ratings
Aggregate scores
Source	Rating
AnyDecentMusic?	7.8/10
Metacritic	83/100
Review scores
Source	Rating
AllMusic	5/5 stars
Exclaim!	9/10
The Irish Times	4/5 stars
Mojo	4/5 stars
NME	7/10
Pitchfork	6.7/10
Q	4/5 stars
Record Collector	4/5 stars
Resident Advisor	4.5/5
Uncut	8/10

At Metacritic, which assigns a weighted average score out of 100 to reviews from mainstream critics, Angels & Devils received an average score of 83, based on 19 reviews, indicating "universal acclaim".

It was placed at number 20 on Fact's "50 Best Albums of 2014" list, as well as number 18 on Rolling Stone's "20 Best EDM, Electronic and Dance Albums of 2014" list.

== Track listing ==
No.	Title	Length
1.	"Void" (featuring Liz Harris)	3:48
2.	"Fall" (featuring Inga Copeland)	2:55
3.	"Ascension"	3:48
4.	"Mi Lost" (featuring Miss Red)	3:15
5.	"Pandi"	4:57
6.	"Save Me" (featuring Gonjasufi)	5:32
7.	"The One" (featuring Flowdan)	4:32
8.	"Function" (featuring Manga)	5:25
9.	"Fuck a Bitch" (featuring Death Grips)	3:04
10.	"Fat Mac" (featuring Flowdan)	3:17
11.	"Fuck You" (featuring Warrior Queen)	3:51
12.	"Dirty" (featuring Flowdan)	2:53
Total length:		47:17

== Charts ==
Chart	Peak position
Belgian Albums (Ultratop Flanders)	91
US Heatseekers Albums (Billboard)	50
