= Byzar =

American electronic music ensemble

Byzar is an American experimental electronic music ensemble, considered one of the founders of the Illbient genre, along with DJ Spooky, Sub Dub, We, and the Soundlab collective, active in the New York experimental dance/electronic music scene during the 1990s.

== Background ==
Founded in 1994 by Akin Adams, the earliest Byzar recordings were long-form textural soundscapes made with a 4-track cassette recording of multiple layers of heavily processed guitars, found objects and a badly damaged Farfisa organ. Adams played guitar in an experimental rock trio called S*A*M, worked as an engineer in a hip-hop and dancehall studio called "Midimation" with artists such as Mikey Dread and KRS-One, and co-hosted a weekly event called "The Abstrakt Lounge" featuring Paul D. Miller, aka DJ Spooky at the "3 of Cups" basement lounge in New York's East Village in 1993.

DJ Spooky lived in the nearby Gas Station, a former gas station turned into a renegade sculpture garden in Alphabet City, and began hosting multimedia events called "Molecular", which attracted artists from the burgeoning Brooklyn dub scenes, DJ's, performance artists and installation designers, who would have free rein to transform the space with inflatables, video projections and various artistic efforts. Adams would provide sound equipment and organization help, and would often create electronic guitar soundscapes at one end of the garage space while Spooky mixed raw breakbeats at the other end.

Abstrakt Lounge and Molecular were part of a network of happenings and events, including the Abstrakt Wave, founded by Tim Sweet in a performance lounge called the RV on NYC's Lower East Side, where Adams began performing as an 'ambient DJ', playing the byzar soundscapes layered with other records and rudimentary beats. Other musicians, Including Hector Becerra, a noted NYC session drummer who played on Taylor Dayne's tour, and Manny Oquendo, who had been a Midimation client with the LES group "Hallucination Station", began jamming with Adams during his sets, and Byzar began to grow into a fluid collective. Miguel Lopez, an NYU grad who also worked as an engineer, offered after-hours studio time at Mike Thorne's "Stereo Society Studios", home of Softcell, and the Byzar began intensive studio experimentation.

Another regular performer & collaborator at Abstract Wave, composer and electric midi violinist Karthik Swaminathan, was referred by NYU classmate Lucy Walker, and he and Adams recorded their first collaboration for Elliot Sharp's State of the Union compilation. As Byzar expanded, Karthik brought in jam collaborators & performance artists Laura Marie Williams and Karl Francke to add visual, performance and sonic elements to Byzar's live show.

Byzar was envisioned as an electronic improvisational experiment, and did not adhere to song structure or popular music formats. Live shows and studio recordings were entirely improvised, with a rotating line-up of "expressionists" playing various instruments and devices. Influenced by dub music, Byzar applied dub studio mixing techniques to their live performances, and varied atmospheric textures with polyrhythmic electronic dance music.

== Members ==
Members include:

- Akin Adams : electronic & acoustic rhythms, electronic guitar, effects and live mixing, codenamed 'Quantyk' for his focus on all things rhythmic
- Manny Oqeundo aka MegMan : electric bass, analog synthesizers, processed vocal effects, codenamed 'Acoustyk' for his background as an acoustic musician
- Miguel Diaz de Lopez: engineering and electronic sound design, samplers and analog synths, codenamed 'Ylyptyk' for his eccentric use of delays and loops
- Karthik Swaminathan : electric violin and effects, codenamed 'Karttyk' for eponymity; currently known as Kit Krash
- Laura Marie Williams : electric bass, vocals
- Lucy Walker : DJ and sound effects
- Hector Becerra : live drums, processed acoustic & vocal effects, codenamed 'Elektryk' as a contrast to 'Acoustyk'
- Karl Francke : harmonica and custom analog synth/oscilloscope controller

== Collaborations ==
The group collaborated at Soundlab events with musicians including Vernon Reid, DJ Spooky, Marc Ribot, Ras Mesinai and Micah Gaugh, and recorded a collaboration "Yaizon" with Priest from the Anti-Pop Consortium, featured on Jungle Sky's "FUNK" compilation. As a charter member of the Soundlab happenings, Byzar played sets with Vernon Reid, Alec Empire, DJ Krush. Byzar collaborated with multimedia artist Mariko Mori on the music for her 3-D work "Nirvana", which was featured in the 1997 Venice Bienniale.

== Installations ==
Byzar also designed multimedia performance installations and site transformations, including "Resonatryx" at The Kitchen, and "Abstrakt Phusion" at the Knitting Factory. Adams designed and managed a 50,000 watt multi-zone integrated soundsystem for the Creative Time Soundlab event at the Brooklyn Bridge Anchorage in 1996, which attracted over 6000 people. Working with promoter Matt E. Silver, Byzar created "chill out" rooms for the New York City shows of The Orb, Prodigy, Chemical Brothers,

== Debut album ==
The debut album, Gaiatronyk vs. the Cheap Robots was released on Asphodel Records, reaching #11 on the CMJ Dance Music Charts.

Lucy Walker directed an avant-garde video for "Phylyx", which aired on MTV's Amp, showing on AMP episodes #116, #122 and #124 The video featured heavily processed stock footage, light painting, and rapid synchronized edits, not showing any of the group's members in easily recognizable form.

Byzar was featured on the cover of issue #154 of Wire Magazine.

Byzar performed internationally, doing a NYC-themed "end of the century" TV special on French Television (M6), playing at London's Institute of Contemporary Art and St. Matthew's Church in Brixton, and playing Der Volksbuhne in Berlin.

Byzar created a white-label only mashup called "Darth Vader vs. The Sugar Plum Fairies" in February 1997, remixing the Imperial March to a mutant hip-hop beat, then blending Tchaikovsky's Dance of the Sugar-Plum Fairies; this record was also given personally to John Peel, who played it on his show several times. DJ Spooky used this as a backing track for Rakim's "Paid in Full" lyrics on recent mixtapes.

Byzar's material was widely downloaded on free sites, and citing poor sales, Asphodel did not seek to release a follow-up album. Byzar languished for several years, attempting to release 'Yaizon' independently in 1998, but finding little traction. Members continue to work individually, and there have been references to a new album, "Polykronyk 13:20".

== Recent activity ==
There is a human gene named after Byzar.

In 2009, Adams revived the Byzar brand for a remix of "Fungirl" by the New York Band Jessica 6, and is currently co-producing Jessica 6's debut album. Byzar appears to be making efforts to revive itself, with a performance at DC's Artomatic festival in 2009.

== Sample reviews ==
"Byzar's impalpable liquid sound hovers between dark Dub and light Ambient. Echoplex snores; some obscure 20th Century electronic composer's vinyl is scratched with reverence and malice; sounds are processed and reprocessed into aural obscurity, erasing the original and creating something wholly within the domain of electricity. This is the same electricity that is found within the body -- synaptic firing, orgones accumulating, neural transmissions, and chi flowing -- all somehow audible at a macro level. Hearing such intimate processes amplified outside the body is somehow uncanny, but Byzar are a slow-motion explosion of pure bliss." [/]

"Byzar are, without argument, precisely that on their debut full-length for Asphodel. Though swiftly pegged as res logicus for the DJ Spooky coattail treatment, this roving collective of beat manipulators and signal mutators are operating from far more interesting territory ... Focusing on off-kilter rhythms and strange and scary monochromatic acoustic and electronic textures, the group's novel sheets of beat-oriented ambient dub-hop recall the more successful moments of Scorn and Techno Animal without falling into the bland repetition and reverb fetishism that tend to mar those groups. A surprisingly mature debut."

== Discography ==
=== Album and EPs ===
- Beings from the B'yond Within, Vol.1 (Asphodel Records) [1996]
- Gaiatronyk vs. the Cheap Robots (Asphodel Records) [1997]
- Beings from B'yond Wythyn, vol. 2 (((Asphodel Records))) (1998)

=== Compilation albums ===
- "This Is Home Entertainment: Volume One"

Song: "Transpyrator" (Home Entertainment) [1995]

- "Incursions In Illbient" compilation (Asphodel Records)[1996]
- "This is Jungle Sky, Vol.6, Funk" (Jungle Sky Records) 1998
- "Necropolis: The Dialogic Project" (Knitting Factory)
