= Memories of the Future =

Studio album by Kode 9 and Spaceape
- Released: 16 October 2006
- Genres: Electronic, dubstep
- Label: Hyperdub
- Producer: Kode9

Kode 9 and Spaceape chronology
Memories of the Future (2006)	Black Sun (2011)

Memories of the Future is the first collaborative studio album by electronic musicians Kode9 and the Spaceape. It was released in 2006 through Hyperdub.

== Critical reception ==
A review in Tiny Mix Tapes described the album as "an important release in dubstep's development." A circumspect review in Resident Advisor noted the "intensity" of the album's "atmosphere", but argued that its quality was somewhat uneven. Journalist Joel Schalit compared it to the work of Linton Kwesi Johnson and Philip K. Dick and argued that it represented the mental distress suffered by minorities in England. Exclaim! called it the "rightful heir" to Tricky's Maxinquaye.

== Track listing ==
1. "Glass" – 4:30
2. "Victims" – 3:51
3. "Backward" – 4:43
4. "Nine" – 1:54
5. "Curious" – 4:58
6. "Portal" – 4:25
7. "Addiction" – 3:40
8. "Sine" – 5:21
9. "Correction" – 3:15
10. "Kingstown" – 4:40
11. "Nine Samurai" – 3:40
12. "Bodies" – 2:26
13. "Lime" – 1:55
14. "Quantum" – 3:18

== Personnel ==
Credits adapted from liner notes.

- Kode9 – production
- The Spaceape – vocals
- Ms. Haptic – additional vocals (1, 5)
- Marco Bettoni – cover photography
