= Nazar (musician) =

Electronic musical artist

- Born: 1993 (age 32–33); Belgium
- Genres: Electronic, Kuduro
- Instrument: FL Studio
- Years active: 2018–present
- Label: Hyperdub

Nazar is an Manchester-based Angolan electronic musician. (Note: Nazar has not publicly shared his name.) He is known for his distinct mixture of the Angolan genre kuduro and electronic music. His stage name is derived from the Justice song "Waters of Nazareth".

== Early life ==
Nazar was born in Belgium in 1993. He is the son of Alcides Sakala Simões, an Angolan politician and former Foreign Affairs Secretary for the National Union for the Total Independence of Angola under Jonas Savimbi. Nazar lived in suburban Brussels until the age of 14. Growing up, the threat of street gangs was a constant. Also, in his childhood, there was a failed kidnapping attempt on his sister. At age 7, Nazar watched a news broadcast wrongly stating that his father had died. By 2002, after the Angolan Civil War, Nazar visited Angola; eventually taking permanent residence in 2007 in the city of Luanda. From the age of 14 Nazar and his family would go on annual pilgrimages to the rural town of Bailundo, the birthplace of his father.

== Career ==
A self-described "alien with no friends", Nazar found himself dealing with depression and in turn found solace in music. By 2007, inspired by the music of Justice, Daft Punk and Burial alongside a desire to impress his classmates, Nazar started to produce music, initially making beats on his father's laptop with a pirated copy of FL studio.

Expanding on the kuduro sound with what he dubs "rough kuduro", Nazar "blends uptempo kuduro beats with aggressive, militaristic sound design and lyrics reflecting on the violence and disorder of the Angolan civil war." In 2018, Nazar released his debut EP Enclave on Hyperdub records. In 2019, Nazar was part of Hyperdub's 15th anniversary show at London's Village. In 2020, he released his album, Guerrilla.

== Discography ==
=== Extended plays ===
- Enclave (2018)

=== Albums ===
- Guerrilla (2020)
- Demilitarize (2025)
