= London Zoo (album) =

Studio album by The Bug
- Released: 7 July 2008
- Genres: Industrial hip hop; ragga; dubstep
- Length: 45:30
- Label: Ninja Tune
- Producer: Kevin Martin

The Bug chronology
Pressure (2003)	London Zoo (2008)	Angels & Devils (2014)

Singles from London Zoo
- 1. "Poison Dart" Released: 2007; 2. "Jah War" Released: 2007; 3. "Skeng" Released: 2007

London Zoo is the third studio album by English musician Kevin Martin under his alias The Bug. It was released on 7 July 2008 by Ninja Tune to widespread critical acclaim. The Wire named London Zoo the record of the year in its annual critics' poll.

== Critical reception ==
Professional ratings
Aggregate scores
Source	Rating
Metacritic	90/100
Review scores
Source	Rating
AllMusic	5/5 stars
Drowned in Sound	9/10
The Guardian	4/5 stars
Mojo	4/5 stars
The Observer	5/5 stars
Pitchfork	8.6/10
PopMatters	9/10
Q	4/5 stars
Uncut	9/10
URB	4/5 stars

At Metacritic, which assigns a weighted average score out of 100 to reviews from mainstream critics, the album received an average score of 90, based on 10 reviews, indicating "universal acclaim". K. Ross Hoffman from AllMusic commented that London Zoo is "an extremely potent, relevant record for its time, capturing an energetic spark that feels tied to the creative renewal of dubstep [...] as well as the tormented spirit of a city ground down and galvanized by recent socio-political developments, both local and global."

== Track listing ==
No.	Title	Writer(s)	Length
1.	"Angry" (featuring Tippa Irie)	Tippa Irie; Kevin Martin	3:37
2.	"Murder We" (featuring Ricky Ranking)	Ricky Ranking; Martin	3:53
3.	"Skeng" (featuring Killa P and Flow Dan)	Killa P; Flow Dan; Martin	4:39
4.	"Too Much Pain" (featuring Ricky Ranking and Aya)	Ricky Ranking; Martin	3:54
5.	"Insane" (featuring Warrior Queen)	Warrior Queen; Martin	4:20
6.	"Jah War" (featuring Flow Dan)	Flow Dan; Martin	2:56
7.	"Fuckaz" (featuring Spaceape)	Spaceape; Martin	5:19
8.	"You & Me" (featuring Roger Robinson)	Roger Robinson; Martin	4:06
9.	"Freak Freak"	Martin	4:53
10.	"Warning" (featuring Flow Dan)	Flow Dan; Martin	3:47
11.	"Poison Dart" (featuring Warrior Queen)	Warrior Queen; Martin	6:06
12.	"Judgement"	Ricky Ranking; Martin	6:06
Total length:			45:30

== Personnel ==
Credits adapted from liner notes.

- The Bug – production
- Kevin Metcalfe – mastering
- Fefe Talavera – artwork
- Claire Emeh – photography

== Release history ==
Region	Date	Label	Format	Catalog no.	Ref.
United Kingdom	July 7, 2008	Ninja Tune	CD	ZENCD132	
United Kingdom	July 7, 2008	Ninja Tune	3X gatefold LP	ZEN132	
Worldwide	July 7, 2008	Ninja Tune	MP3 download bundle	ZENDNL132	
United States	August 12, 2008	Ninja Tune	CD		
