= ST-X Ensemble =

American music ensemble

The ST-X Ensemble is an American ensemble dedicated to performing the music of Iannis Xenakis. It was formed in New York City in 1994 by the conductor Charles Zachary Bornstein, who had served as an assistant conductor to Leopold Stokowski, and was the last private student of the Austrian musical conductor Hans Swarowsky. He formed the music to promote performances of Xenakis's music in the United States after learning that most of the performances of that composer's music took place outside the United States.

The ensemble has released CDs on the Mode and Asphodel labels. It has collaborated with DJ Spooky.
