= Sirens (Kevin Richard Martin album) =

Studio album by Kevin Richard Martin
- Released: 7 June 2019
- Length: 61:00
- Label: Room40
- Producer: Kevin Richard Martin

Kevin Richard Martin chronology
| Sirens (2019) | Return to Solaris (2021) |

Sirens is a solo studio album by English musician Kevin Richard Martin. It was released on 7 June 2019 through Room40. It received universal acclaim from critics.

== Background ==
Sirens is Kevin Richard Martin's first studio album under his real name. He has also released his solo music under the pseudonym The Bug. Sirens draws inspiration from his wife's emergency procedures during the birth and two life-threatening operations for his son. The album originates from a 2015 live performance at the CTM Festival. Lawrence English saw the performance and asked to release the work on his record label Room40.

== Critical reception ==
Professional ratings
Aggregate scores
| Source | Rating |
|---|---|
| Metacritic | 82/100 |
Review scores
| Source | Rating |
| Exclaim! | 8/10 |
| Pitchfork | 7.4/10 |
| PopMatters | 8/10 |
| Resident Advisor | 3.9/5 |
| Spectrum Culture | 3.75/5 |

According to the review aggregator Metacritic, Sirens received "universal acclaim" based on a weighted average score of 82 out of 100 from 7 critic scores.

Euan Andrews of The Quietus called the album "a dense and weighty work of art which examines the areas between life and death in which we shall all find ourselves." He added, "Kevin Richard Martin is making music about subject matters almost wilfully unconsidered by many due to the sheer terrors represented within their everyday realities." Daniel Bromfield of PopMatters commented that "It feels perverse to enjoy an album about a man's real trauma as a thrill-ride, but Sirens comes out as one of the most beguiling and frightening works of domestic horror ever committed to record." Ben Cardew of Pitchfork stated, "It is both abstract and primal, the recorded equivalent of a panicky feeling in the gut; its moments of staggering dark intensity bring to mind the nameless dread of the best horror soundtracks."

== Track listing ==
All tracks are written by Kevin Richard Martin.

Sirens track listing
| No. | Title | Length |
|---|---|---|
| 1. | "There Is a Problem" | 2:02 |
| 2. | "Bad Dream" | 5:38 |
| 3. | "After the Party" | 3:21 |
| 4. | "Life Threatening Operation 2" | 10:48 |
| 5. | "Alarms" | 2:52 |
| 6. | "Too Much" | 4:09 |
| 7. | "The Surgeon" | 2:49 |
| 8. | "Mechanical Chatter in the I.C.U." | 3:35 |
| 9. | "Kangaroo Care" | 3:24 |
| 10. | "The Deepest Fear" | 2:31 |
| 11. | "Necrosis" | 7:49 |
| 12. | "Loss of Consciousness" | 3:26 |
| 13. | "Finalling" | 2:18 |
| 14. | "A Bright Future" | 5:31 |
| Total length: | | 61:00 |

== Personnel ==
Credits adapted from liner notes.

- Kevin Richard Martin – production
- Stefan Betke – mastering
