= Riddim Warfare =

1998 studio album by DJ Spooky

Studio album by DJ Spooky
- Released: 1998

Riddim Warfare is a 1998 studio album by DJ Spooky. It includes contributions from Sir Menelik, Kool Keith, Killah Priest, Thurston Moore, Ben Neil, Arto Lindsay, and Mariko Mori.

== Critical reception ==
Professional ratings
Review scores
| Source | Rating |
|---|---|
| AllMusic | 4/5 stars |
| CMJ New Music Monthly | favorable |

John Bush of AllMusic commented, "Only one man could conceive of an album including turntable battles, a workout for Sonic Youth guitarist Thurston Moore, and a spoken-word piece on the same album." Joshua Klein of The A.V. Club said, "the record is a surprisingly lithe and notably straightforward exercise in hip-hop psychedelia." Marc Weingarten of Vibe called it "the most cohesive and rhythmically righteous album of his career."

== Track listing ==
All tracks are written by Paul D. Miller, except where noted.

| No. | Title | Writer(s) | Length |
|---|---|---|---|
| 1. | "Pandemonium" | | 1:29 |
| 2. | "Synchronic Disjecta" | | 4:26 |
| 3. | "Object Unknown" | Paul D. Miller, Keith Thornton, L. Phillip Collington, Jr., Larry Smith, Joseph Simmons, Darryl McDaniels | 5:14 |
| 4. | "It's Nice Not to Lose Your Mind" | | 0:36 |
| 5. | "Dialectical Transformation I (A Parallax View)" | | 1:34 |
| 6. | "Post-Human Sophistry" | | 3:53 |
| 7. | "Quilombo Ex Optico" | | 3:32 |
| 8. | "Rekonstruction" | Paul D. Miller, Larry Baskerville, Troy Jamerson | 4:42 |
| 9. | "Scientifik" | Paul D. Miller, L. Phillip Collington, Jr. | 3:43 |
| 10. | "A Conversation" | | 3:26 |
| 11. | "Peace in Zaire" | | 7:59 |
| 12. | "Dialectical Transformation II (Du Nouveau Monde)" | | 1:14 |
| 13. | "Degree Zero" | Paul D. Miller, Walter Reed | 4:50 |
| 14. | "Roman Planetaire" | | 3:57 |
| 15. | "Bass Digitalis" | | 1:02 |
| 16. | "Polyphony of One" | | 6:19 |
| 17. | "Riddim Warfare" | Paul D. Miller, Keith Thornton | 3:20 |
| 18. | "The Nerd" | | 1:43 |
| 19. | "Dialectical Transformation III (Soylent Green)" | | 2:11 |
| 20. | "Theme of the Drunken Sailor" | | 5:18 |
| 21. | "Twilight Fugue" | | 2:12 |

== Personnel ==
- DJ Spooky – nmbara, wind chimes, gongs, street noises, additional vocals, bass, electric guitar on track 3, acoustic guitar on track 8
- Sir Menelik – vocals on tracks 3, 9
- Kool Keith – vocals on tracks 3, 17
- Akin Atoms – guitar on tracks 4, 14, 20
- Karsh Kale – drums on tracks 4, 14, 20
- Arto Lindsay – guitar on track 7
- Lucio Maia – guitar on track 7
- Dhengue – bass on track 7
- Jorge Du Peixe – drums on track 7
- Gulmar Bola8 – drums on track 7
- Gira – drums on track 7
- Pupilo – drums on track 7
- Toca Ogan – percussion on track 7
- Marcos Matias – percussion on track 7
- Prince Poetry – vocals on track 8
- Pharoah Monch – vocals on track 8
- Vinicius Cantuaria – acoustic guitar on track 8
- Ambassador Jr. – vocals and scratches on track 10
- Grisha Coleman – vocals on track 11
- Killah Priest – vocals on track 13
- Manny Oquendo – keyboard on tracks 14, 20
- Micah Gaugh – saxophone on track 14
- Julia Sher – vocals on track 16
- Thurston Moore – guitar on track 19
- Ben Neil – trumpet on track 20
- Mariko Mori – vocals on track 21
