= Roger Robinson (poet) =

British writer, musician and performer

Roger Robinson FRSL
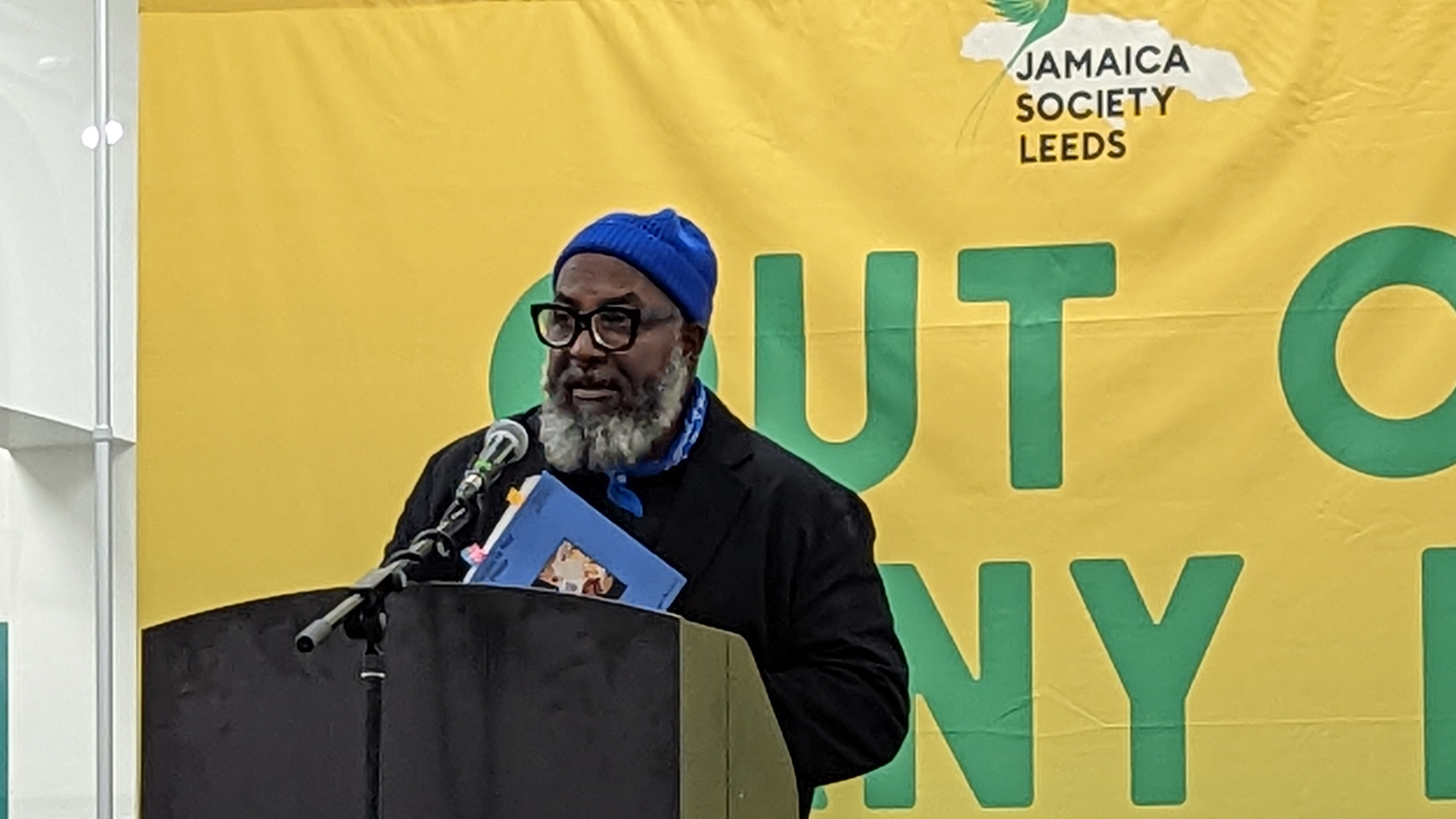
- Robinson at Out of Many Lit Fest in Leeds
- Born: Hackney, London, England
- Occupations: Writer; musician; performer
- Notable work: A Portable Paradise
- Awards: T. S. Eliot Prize, 2019; Ondaatje Prize, 2020
- Website: rogerrobinsononline.com

Roger Robinson FRSL is a British writer, musician and performer who lives between England and Trinidad. He is best known for A Portable Paradise, which won the T. S. Eliot Prize 2019.

== Early life ==
Robinson was born in Hackney, London, to Trinidadian parents, and at the age of four went with them to live in Trinidad, returning to England when he was 19 in the 1980s, He initially lived with his grandmother in Ilford, Essex, before moving to Brixton. He describes himself as "a British resident with a Trini sensibility".

== Spoken word, dub, music ==
From the early 1990s, Robinson has practised as a spoken-word performer in London. He has performed with the bands Techno Animal, Flytronix, The Bug, Attica Blues and Speeka. Robinson is the lead vocalist for the musical crossover project King Midas Sound. Their debut album Waiting for You was released on Hyperdub Records, and was named among the top 50 releases of 2009 in The Wire. His solo album of spoken folk, illclectica, was named by Mojo as one of the top 10 electronic albums of that year. In 2015 he released Dis Side Ah Town described as "an album that lyrically recalls the most incisive and suggestive lyricists in dub and roots reggae". Heaven's Lathe released Robinson's "Sound Man" as a single in 2024.

His one-man spoken-word shows The Shadow Boxer, Letter from My Father's Brother and Prohibition all premiered at the British Festival of Visual Theatre at Battersea Arts Centre. Robinson's commissions have included work for the Theatre Royal Stratford East, the National Trust, London Open House, the National Portrait Gallery, LIFT and the Tate.

== Poetry ==
In 1999, Robinson was one of 30 poets chosen for the New Generation Poets collection at the National Portrait Gallery, London. Robinson went on to publish four collections of poetry between 2004 and 2019. Robinson has toured with the British Council.

In 2010, his collection Suckle won the People's Book Prize.

His 2013 collection The Butterfly Hotel was one of three poetry titles shortlisted for the 2014 OCM Bocas Prize for Caribbean Literature.

A Portable Paradise (Peepal Tree Press) won the T. S. Eliot Prize 2019. Robinson is the second writer of Caribbean heritage to win this prize, the highest value award in UK poetry, following Derek Walcott in 2010. Robinson's victory was further described as significant for small presses. A Portable Paradise went on to be the second book of poetry to win the Ondaatje Prize in May 2020.

== Poetry community ==
Until 2000, Robinson was programme co-ordinator of the performance poetry organisation Apples and Snakes. His workshops have been a part of a shortlist for the Gulbenkian Prize for Museums and Galleries and were also a part of the Barbican Centre's Can I Have A Word. He is a co-founder of London poetry collective Malika's Poetry Kitchen with fellow poets Malika Booker and Jacob-Sam La Rose.

Robinson was chosen by arts organisation Decibel as one of 50 writers who have influenced black-British writing over the past 50 years.

== Bibliography ==
=== Poetry collections ===
- —— (2005). Suitcase. Flipped Eye Publishing. ISBN 9780954224776.
- —— (2009). Suckle. Waterways Series. ISBN 9781905233212.
- —— (2013). The Butterfly Hotel. Peepal Tree Press. ISBN 9781845232191.
- —— (2019). A Portable Paradise. Peepal Tree Press. ISBN 9781845234331.

=== Short fiction ===
- —— (2001). Adventures in 3D. Lubin & Kleyner. ISBN 0954157001.

== Albums ==
- Heavy Vibes (Jahtari, 2024)
- Dog Heart City (Jahtari, 2017)
- Dis Side Ah Town (Jahtari, 2015)
- illclectica (Altered Vibes, 2004)

== Awards and recognition ==
- 2019: T. S. Eliot Prize
- 2020: Ondaatje Prize for A Portable Paradise
- 2020: elected Fellow of the Royal Society of Literature (FRSL)
