= The Spaceape =

British musician

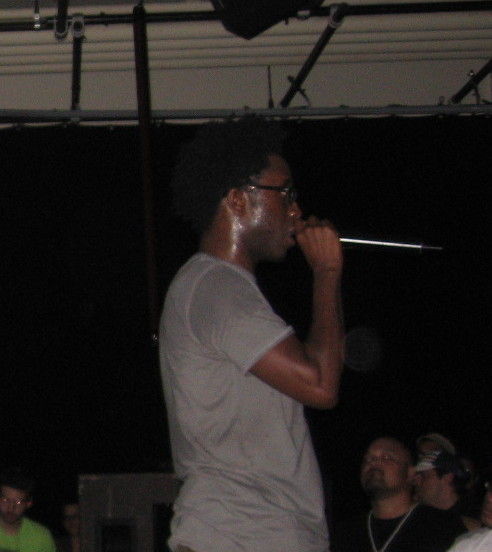
- The Spaceape performing with Kode9 at Mutek in 2007

Background information
- Also known as: Daddy Gee
- Born: Stephen Samuel Gordon; 17 June 1970; United Kingdom
- Died: 2 October 2014 (aged 44)
- Genres: Electronic, dubstep, spoken word
- Occupations: Musician, vocalist, poet
- Label: Hyperdub
- Website: hyperdub.com

Stephen Samuel Gordon (17 June 1970 – 2 October 2014), known as The Spaceape, was a British poet and MC. He is known for his work on the electronic music label Hyperdub, and in particular for his frequent collaborations with labelmate Kode9. He was described by The Guardian as "a pioneering Hyperdub artist," while Pitchfork Media stated that "if first-wave UK dubstep had a voice, it belonged to Stephen Gordon."

Gordon died on 2 October 2014 at the age of 44, following a battle with a rare form of cancer.

== Career ==
Gordon was involved with much of the earliest music released by pioneering dubstep label Hyperdub, run by friend and frequent collaborator Steve Goodman a.k.a. Kode9. Throughout his career, he also collaborated with Burial, The Bug, Martyn, Redshape, Dub Gabriel, the Echologist, Jerry Dammers, Spatial AKA Orchestra, and Junior Boys.

According to Pitchfork, "[the] Spaceape lent his ten-ton doomsayer croak to dozens of definitive works of music and was positioned as the Linton Kwesi Johnson of the post-7/7, surveillance-state UK."

== Personal life ==
Gordon was married with one daughter. He died on 2 October 2014 from a rare form of cancer.

== Discography ==
=== Studio albums ===
- Memories of the Future (with Kode9) (Hyperdub, 2006)
- Black Sun (with Kode9) (Hyperdub, 2011)

=== Singles & EPs ===
- Is This Insanity? (with Martyn) (Alpha Pup, 2009)
- Love & Machines (with Martyn) (Brainfeeder, 2011)
- Xorcism (Hyperdub, 2012)
- Killing Season (with Kode9) (Hyperdub, 2014)
