= Jahtari =

German record label

Jahtari is a netlabel, founded in 2004 by Jan Gleichmar a.k.a. "disrupt". Unlike most netlabels, it focuses on the dub and reggae music genres, with an electronic music approach which it calls "digital laptop reggae". According to The List, "the name is an amalgam of ‘Jah’ and ‘Atari’, and a similar lo-fi 8-bit aesthetic informs their branding and design."

From their site:

"We are a small record label based in Leipzig/Germany and we produce a kind of music here which we call - for the lack of a better term - DIGITAL LAPTOP REGGAE (DLR).This means nothing else but that we produce first and above all REGGAE music (or DUB) in its classical sense, which in itself is nothing new, but since we're having a background of mostly electronic music we're doing this with the only tool that is obvious to use for that purpose - a COMPUTER, and a computer only."

Jan Gleichmar has been working as a camera assistant. By 2006, Jahtari had started to offer a release on CD in addition to the free downloads, and later produced vinyl releases too. As of 2008, it had signed more than 20 artists, among them London-based Mikey Murka (a veteran of 1980s digital reggae).
