= Optometry (album) =

Studio album by DJ Spooky
- Released: 2002
- Genre: Turntablism, free jazz
- Label: Thirsty Ear
- Producer: DJ Spooky

DJ Spooky chronology
Modern Mantra (2002)	Optometry (2002)	Optometrix (2003)

Optometry is an album by the American musician DJ Spooky, released in 2002. It was part of Thirsty Ear Recordings' Blue Series of albums. DJ Spooky considered it an example of Gesamtkunstwerk. He supported the album with a North American tour. A remix album, Dubtrometry, was released in 2003.

== Production ==
The tracks began as free form improvisations played by musicians recruited by DJ Spooky, who then altered, edited, and applied samples to the songs; he also played bass and kalimba. Matthew Shipp played piano on the album; Pauline Oliveros contributed on accordion. William Parker played bass and Guillermo E. Brown served as the project's drummer. Joe McPhee contributed on trumpet and saxophone. "Asphalt (Tome II)" contains a spoken word contribution from Carl Hancock Rux.

== Critical reception ==
Professional ratings
Review scores
Source	Rating
AllMusic	4/5 stars
Los Angeles Times	3.5/4 stars
Philadelphia Daily News	B+
Pitchfork	7.5/10
The Province	4.5/5 stars
(The New) Rolling Stone Album Guide	4/5 stars

Pitchfork wrote: "Rather than just make an album that merges a few different techniques or genres, Spooky has made a point of calling attention to it... Ultimately, Spooky casts himself as ringleader to a revolution that fails to happen—after the initial bustle of a few extremely strong tracks, Optometry wanders blindly for far too long." The Gazette noted that the album melds "music and social theory with collage-like cross-referencing." The Los Angeles Times concluded that "DJ culture does have its Zappa, its Stockhausen, its Cage, an artist defying fashion and changing the possibilities of music forever... Without vinyl pyrotechnics, Spooky reveals how free jazz is also the highest expression of outlaw classical composition."

The Boston Globe determined that, "there may be programmed beats, samples, synthesizers, and even a bit of rapping on this disc, but it's free jazz at heart, it grooves throughout—and it just may be the Bitches Brew of its era." The Independent said that "Optometry hangs around menacingly towards the 'free' end of the jazz spectrum, the intellectual end of the hip-hop one, but that doesn't mean it's an ugly bastard." Rolling Stone deemed Optometry "a fusion exercise that's at turns pensive and frenetic but always richly textured."

AllMusic wrote that "Optometry is fully a DJ outing and fully a jazz record."

== Track listing ==
No.	Title	Length
1.	"Ibid, Désmarches, Ibid"
2.	"Reactive Switching Strategies for the Control of Uninhabited Air"
3.	"Variation Cybernétique: Rhythmic Pataphysic (Part I)"
4.	"Asphalt (Tome II)"
5.	"Optometry"
6.	"Sequentia Absentia (Dialectical Triangulation I)"
7.	"Rosemary"
8.	"Dementia Absentia (Dialectical Triangulation II)"
9.	"Parachutes"
10.	"Absentia Absentia (Dialectical Triangulation III)"
11.	"Variation Cybernétique: Rhythmic Pataphysic (Part II)"
12.	"Périphique"
13.	"It's a Mad, Mad, Mad, World"
