= Kevin Martin (British musician) =

British music producer

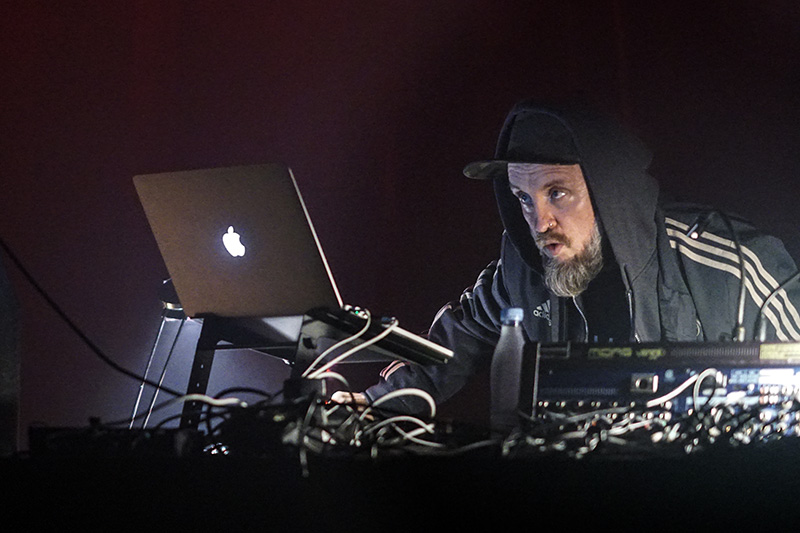
- Martin performing in Aarhus, Denmark, 2018

Background information
- Also known as: The Bug
- Born: Kevin Richard Martin
- Origin: United Kingdom
- Genres: Dub; industrial; dancehall; jazzcore; hip hop; dubstep
- Occupations: Music producer; musician
- Labels: Intercrannial; Pressure; Ninja Tune; Hyperdub; Rephlex

Kevin Richard Martin, often known under his recording alias The Bug, is an English musician and music producer. Martin moved from Weymouth to London around 1990 and is now currently based in mainland Europe. He has been active for over three decades in the genres of dub, jazzcore, industrial hip hop, dancehall, and dubstep.

Martin's projects include GOD, Techno Animal, Ice, Curse of the Golden Vampire, Pressure and, most recently, King Midas Sound (with poet Roger Robinson and singer/visual artist Kiki Hitomi) and The Bug vs Earth.

== Early life ==
Martin first became interested in music as a teenager going to Handsome Dick's, a record store in Weymouth, Dorset, England, UK. At the same time, he was introduced to the music of Joy Division, the Sex Pistols, Captain Beefheart, the Birthday Party and Throbbing Gristle. He has described his initial interest in music as stemming from his difficult family situation during his childhood, adding, "It seemed like everything that I hated about English conservative monoculture was being burned and turned upside down through music," and "post-punk music was tearing up rule books and asking questions of everything, particularly structure in terms of music, art, politics, you know, the law."

Martin first began making music after he was attracted to a do-it-yourself (DIY) aesthetic. He first worked with a four-track recorder and effects pedal, saying, "[I] was interested in everything that wasn't harmony, melody, and conservative musical structure. Dub seemed to tear everything to shreds, burn it up, and rearrange the embers" (referring to dub music). He described his early experiences of music in London as being very influential in his style and appreciation of music, especially after he experienced Iration Steppas and The Disciples in the early 1990s. He described his experience in the London music scene as taking a while to sync his ears up to ragga and digital dancehall, two genres of music in which he has become well known.

== Musical projects ==
=== GOD ===
GOD was a jazzcore group that was part of the grindcore and industrial metal scenes. Justin Broadrick, formerly of Napalm Death and later of Godflesh, eventually joined. This was the first of Martin's collaborations with Broadrick, Techno Animal and Ice being subsequent. John Zorn also worked with this group.

=== Techno Animal ===
An industrial hip-hop and ambient-music collaboration with Justin Broadrick that also collaborated with Dälek, Vast Aire, and Anti-Pop Consortium. In early 2017 Techno Animal reunited for a final gig in Berlin, and Martin and Broadrick announced plans to continue their Techno Animal collaboration under the name Zonal.

=== Ice ===
Ice included Martin on vocals, saxophone, synthesizer, and turntables; Justin Broadrick on guitar; David Cochrane on bass; and Lou Ciccotelli on drums. Its first album, Under the Skin, was somewhat similar to the industrial metal of Broadrick's Godflesh, but with a more experimentalist bent, notably via Martin's free jazz-influenced saxophone. By Bad Blood (In Bloom/Reprise/Warner Bros. Records), its second album, the band had absorbed a great deal of hip-hop influence, and nearly all the songs featured contributions from guests well known in underground hip hop, including El-P. However, the experimentalism continued, with singer Blixa Bargeld of legendary industrial band Einstürzende Neubauten appearing as well, often alongside the emcees. According to critic Ned Raggett, the experiments are not always successful, but he credits the band for expanding its sound.

=== Curse of the Golden Vampire ===
Originally a collaboration between Techno Animal and Alec Empire in an industrial hip-hop vein. The second album, Mass Destruction, featured only Martin and Broadrick and moved into a more vicious breakcore and digital hardcore style with elements of grindcore, industrial hip-hop, and noise/power electronics.

=== The Bug ===
The Bug's music is influenced by dancehall, noise, grime, and hip hop. More subtle influences include dubstep and the dubtronica and broken techno of Basic Channel and Pole. The Bug's first album, Tapping The Conversation, was released in 1997 on the seminal Wordsound label. The album was conceived as an alternative soundtrack to the 1974 Francis Ford Coppola film The Conversation. In this incarnation, The Bug consisted of Kevin Martin and DJ Vadim, and existed in more of a downtempo and trip hop vein. From 2001–2004 The Bug collaborated with UK reggae soundsystem veteran The Rootsman on a number of limited edition 7" singles, released on the Razor X label. These releases were characterised by their harsh, aggressive nature both musically and vocally (vocal artists including Jamaican MCs such as He-Man and Wayne Lonesome).

The Bug's second album, Pressure was released on Rephlex Records in 2003. It included a number of more ambient, dub-influenced tracks alongside the ragga-tinged onslaughts. The Razor X singles were compiled on the Killing Sound album (along with newer material) which was released by Rephlex in 2006. Bug projects have included collaborations with a number of singers and MCs including Cutty Ranks, Flowdan, Warrior Queen, Ras B and Miss Red. In 2005 he collaborated with Mark Stewart and Keith Levene and has released records on Rephlex, Tigerbeat6 and Klien Records. The Bug produced some radio sessions, including a clash with Soundmurderer on John Peel and a 2006 Breezeblock session with 10 MCs.

In 2006, The Bug launched a monthly London-based reggae club night entitled BASH, in collaboration with dubstep producer Loefah. 2008 saw the release of London Zoo, the third full release from the project, on Ninja Tune to critical acclaim.

After a six-year hiatus, The Bug returned with their fourth effort Angels & Devils, again to critical acclaim. In October 2016, The Bug brought their new project Sirens to London for a special performance.

=== Pressure ===
A dub project, with releases on the Hyperdub label.

=== Black Chow ===
Reggae-dub/trip hop collaboration with Kiki Hitomi, now, under the Jahtari record label (previous releases with Hyperdub). Black Chow incorporates Lo-Fi elements into their music, which is typical of artists on the Jahtari record label.

=== King Midas Sound ===
King Midas Sound is a musical crossover project, composed of Martin, London/Trinidad poet Roger Robinson and Japanese artist and singer Kiki Hitomi. Their first 12" release "(HDB014) Cool Out" and debut album Waiting For You... are both released through Kode9's Hyperdub label. "Meltdown" also featured on the 5 Years Of Hyperdub CD release in 2009. Their 12", "Aroo," was released on Ninja Tune in 2013. Their second album, Solitude, a drone ambient album with Robinson's spoken word performances, was released on Valentine's Day of 2019 on Cosmo Rhythmatic.

=== Zonal ===
In 2017 Martin and Broadrick reformed their Techno Animal project under the name Zonal, under which they'd released The Quatermass Project in 2000.

The pair hated the Techno Animal name and had intended to use Zonal for The Brotherhood of the Bomb, but Matador Records only offered to fund the album under what they considered the stronger Techno Animal brand.

In 2017 through to 2019 Zonal performed older Techno Animal material and new Zonal music, and performed at Roadburn and Le Guess Who? with Moor Mother. In early 2020 the group released their first album, Wrecked, on Relapse Records. Moor Mother was guest vocalist on six of the twelve tracks. Bob Cluness of The Quietus called the album "a leviathan of desolate mood music" and a "joyously feel bad album whose grinding negativity and tidal heaviness provides a necessary form of catharsis."

=== Compilations ===
He also compiled the Macro Dub Infection (parts one and two), Ambient 4: Isolationism and Jazz Satellites CDs for the Virgin Ambient series.

=== Kevin Richard Martin ===
Under his real name Kevin Richard Martin, he released Sirens (2019), as well as Return to Solaris (2021).

== Influences ==
Kevin Martin has discussed his admiration for Jah Shaka, Adrian Sherwood, King Tubby, Lee Perry, Swans, Public Enemy, and Thomas Köner.

== Journalism ==
He has previously written for music magazines such as The Wire, Muzik and Jockey Slut.

== Partial discography ==
=== God ===
- Loco (Pathological Records, 1991)
- Possession (Caroline, 1992)
- Consumed (Sentrax/Blazer Corps,1993)
- The Anatomy of Addiction (Big Cat, 1994)

=== Techno Animal ===
- Ghosts (Pathological, 1991)
- Re-Entry (Virgin, 1995)
- Techno Animal Versus Reality (City Slang, 1998)
- Symbiotics (with Porter Ricks) (Force Inc. Music Works, 1999)
- The Brotherhood of the Bomb (Matador, 2001)

=== Ice ===
Albums

- Under the Skin (Pathological, 1993)
- Bad Blood (In Bloom/Reprise/Warner Bros. Records, 1998)

Singles & EPs

- "Quarantine" (Carcrashh, 1995)
- "Bad Blood Transfusion" (with Underdog) (Morpheus, 1998)
- "Headwreck" (Morpheus, 1998)
- "Trapped in Three Dimensions" (Morpheus, 1999)

=== Curse of the Golden Vampire ===
- Curse of the Golden Vampire, (Digital Hardcore Recordings, 1998)
- Mass Destruction, (Ipecac, 2003)

=== The Bug ===
Albums

- Tapping the Conversation (WordSound, 1997)
- Pressure (Rephlex Records, 2003)
- London Zoo (Ninja Tune, 2008)
- Filthy EP: "Freakshow", "Louder", "Dirty", "Kill Them" (2013)
- Angels & Devils (Ninja Tune, 2014)
- Concrete Desert (with Earth) (Ninja Tune, 2017)
- In Blue (with Dis Fig) (Hyperdub, 2020)
- Fire (Ninja Tune, 2021)
- Machine (Relapse Records, 2024)

Featuring – Daddy Freddy

Singles (incomplete)

- "Low Rider" – 12" single (Fat Cat, 1999)
- "Seismic" – 12" single (Morpheus, 2001)
- "Beats, Bombs, Bass, Weapons" – 7" single (Klein, 2003)
- "Buckle Up" – 12" single (Buckout, 2003)
- "Gun Disease" – 12" single (Rephlex Records, 2003)
- "Aktion Pak" – 12" single (Rephlex Records, 2004)
- "Dem a Bomb We" – 12" single (Soul Jazz Records, 2005)
- "Fire" – 12" single (Klein, 2005)
- "Poison Dart" (featuring Warrior Queen) – 12" single (Ninja Tune, 2007)
- "Jah War" (featuring Flowdan) – 12" single (Ninja Tune, 2007)
- "Skeng" (featuring Killa P and Flowdan) – 12" single (Hyperdub, 2007)
- "Ganja" (featuring Killa P and Flowdan) / "Flying" (featuring Ricky Ranking) – 12" single (Ninja Tune, 2008)
- "Infected" – 12" single (Ninja Tune, 2010)
- "Run" – 12" single (Swamp81, 2010)
- "Can't Take This No More/Rise Up" (Acid Ragga/Ninja Tune, 2012)
- "Ganja Baby" (featuring Daddy Freddy) / "Diss Mi Army" (featuring Miss Red) (Acid Ragga/Ninja Tune, 2012)
- "Hardcore Lover/Goodbye" (Acid Ragga/Ninja Tune, 2013)
- "Boa/Cold" (with Earth) (Ninja Tune, 2014)
- "Zim Zim Zim" (featuring Burro Banton) (Ninja Tune, 2015)
- "Box" (featuring D Double E) / "Iceman" (featuring Riko Dan) (Ninja Tune, 2016)
- "Bad" (featuring Flowdan) / "Get Out the Way" (featuring Killa P and Irah) (Ninja Tune, 2017)
- "Clash" (featuring Logan) (Ninja Tune, 2021)
- "Pressure" (featuring Flowdan) (Ninja Tune, 2021)
- "Treetop" (featuring Jason Williamson) (Ninja Tune, 2021)
- "Rosin" (vs. Al Cisneros) (Pressure, 2022)
- "Machine I" (Pressure, 2023)
- "Machine 2" (Pressure, 2023)
- "Machine 3" (Pressure 2023)

Remixes (incomplete)

- "Harrowdown Hill" – originally by Thom Yorke
- "Satellite" – originally by the Kills
- "Malarkey" – originally by the Earlyman
- "Emergency Room" – originally by Ford & Lopatin
- "Make Some Noise" – originally by Beastie Boys
- "Black Stacey" – originally by Saul Williams
- "Le Haine" – originally by Asian Dub Foundation

=== Black Chow ===
- Hyperdub 5.1 – 12", EP (Hyperdub, August 2009)
- Wonderland – Featuring Pupajim, 12", EP (Jahtari, 2011)

=== King Midas Sound ===
Albums

- Waiting For You... (Hyperdub, 2009)
- Without You (Hyperdub, 2011)
- Edition 1 - with Christian Fennesz (Ninja Tune, 2015)
- Solitude (Cosmo Rhythmatic, 2019)

Singles & EPs

- "Cool Out" (Hyperdub, 2008)
- "Dub Heavy – Hearts & Ghosts" (Hyperdub, 2009)
- "Lost" (Hyperdub, 2010)
- "Goodbye Girl" (Hyperdub, 2011)

=== Kevin Richard Martin ===
- Sirens (Room40, 2019)
- Return to Solaris (Phantom Limb, 2021)
- Disconnect (in collaboration with KMRU) (Phantom Limb, 2024)
- Otherness (in collaboration with KMRU) (Phantom Limb, 2024)
