= Techno Animal =

British musical duo

- Origin: London, England
- Genres: Illbient, dub, post-industrial, dark ambient
- Years active: 1991–2004
- Labels: Pathological, Virgin, Blue Angel, Position/Chrome, City Slang, Digital Hardcore, Matador
- Members: Justin Broadrick; Kevin Martin

Techno Animal was an electronic duo formed in 1990 in London, England by British musicians Justin Broadrick (of the band Godflesh) and Kevin Martin (a.k.a. the Bug, of the band God). The duo released six LPs beginning with their 1991 debut Ghosts. They blended dub production with dark, beat-oriented ambient music and paranoiac themes.

== History ==
Kevin Martin had already formed the industrial metal group God in 1987. Justin Broadrick had founded Godflesh in 1988, recorded with Napalm Death and would soon join God alongside Martin. The Techno Animal project came to fruition in 1990, arising from the musicians' shared interest in studio exploration. The intent was to restrict the project to the studio and use sampling to develop the music, with no intent to perform the material live. The name refers to the concept of a technological animal and is not a direct reference to the techno genre.

Techno Animal's debut album Ghosts was released in 1991. In his review of the album, English music critic Simon Reynolds compared the music to that of other sample-based acts such as Einstürzende Neubauten, Die Krupps and 23 Skidoo.

In 2017, Martin and Broadrick reunited after fifteen years and formed the band Zonal. According to Broadrick, this new project is a spiritual continuation of Techno Animal. Regarding Zonal, he said:

"We felt fresh again about collaboration; we didn’t wish to pursue something with an old name... Although as Zonal we play some old Techno Animal songs, most of our set is new material as Zonal. It pretty much continues where we left off as Techno Animal."

== Influence ==
Notably, Techno Animal's music was an important source of inspiration for electronic music musician Kid606, with their debut album Ghosts being particularly influential to him. "It was one of the first experimental electronic records I had ever heard," he said, "Kevin Martin and Justin Broadrick were humongous influences on me from early on."

== Discography ==
Albums

- Ghosts (Pathological, 1991)
- Re-Entry (Virgin, 1995)
- Radio Hades (Position Chrome, 1998)
- Techno Animal Versus Reality (City Slang, 1998)
- Symbiotics (with Porter Ricks) (Force Inc. Music Works, 1999)
- The Brotherhood of the Bomb (Matador, 2001)

Singles & EPs

- Babylon Seeker (Blue Angel, 1996)
- Unmanned (Position Chrome, 1996)
- Demonoid (City Slang, 1997)
- Phobic (Position Chrome, 1997)
- Cyclops (Position Chrome, 1998)
- Brotherhood of the Bomb/Monolith (Force Inc. Music Works, 1999)
- Megaton/Classical Homicide (with Dälek) (Matador, 2000)
- Dead Man's Curse (Matador, 2001)
- We Can Build You (Matador, 2001)
