= Kode9 =

Scottish electronic music artist & Dj

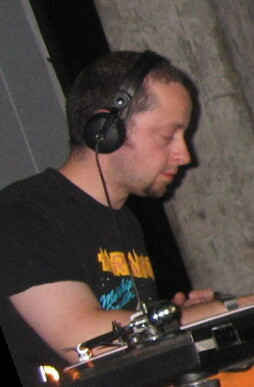
- Kode9 and The Spaceape performing at MUTEK in 2007

Background information
- Born: Steve Goodman; 1973 (age 52–53); Glasgow, Scotland
- Genres: Electronic, dubstep, future garage, UK bass
- Occupations: Musician, record label owner, remixer, DJ
- Instruments: Synthesizer, sampler, mixing desk, turntables, bass guitar
- Years active: 1991–present
- Label: Hyperdub
- Website: http://www.hyperdub.com

Steve Goodman, known as Kode9 (born 1973) is a Scottish electronic music artist, DJ, and founder of the Hyperdub record label. He was one of the founding members of the early dubstep scene with his late collaborator The Spaceape. He has released four full-length albums: 2006's Memories of the Future and 2011's Black Sun (both with The Spaceape), Nothing (2015), Escapology and Astro-Darien (2022).

As owner of Hyperdub, Goodman has signed artists such as Burial, DJ Rashad, Zomby, and Fatima Al Qadiri. Goodman has a PhD in philosophy from the University of Warwick and has published a book, Sonic Warfare: Sound, Affect, and the Ecology of Fear, in 2009.

== Biography ==
=== Foundations ===
Kode9 studied philosophy at university in Edinburgh in the early 1990s. During this time he started DJing, playing music genres including psychedelic jazz, rare groove and funk. However, around this time he started becoming interested in jungle. He has mentioned his first encounter with jungle as being "the most important musical event of my life".

Kode9 moved to Warwick to study rave culture, cybernetics, postmodernism and afrofuturism at the University of Warwick. This later led to a memetic philosophy regarding music, which he has spoken about in interviews. He gained a PhD in philosophy from the university. Here he also collaborated with the Cybernetic Culture Research Unit and was involved in running jungle nights.

In 1999, Kode9 moved to London, becoming a teaching assistant and later a lecturer. At this time Kode9 began finding a lot of drum'n'bass formulaic and he was looking to expand his musical horizons. He became interested in 2 step garage, DJing the style at clubnights such as FWD>>. He also played on pirate radio stations including Rinse FM.

=== Musical artist and Hyperdub ===
In 1999, Kode9 had his first release as a musical artist, 'Katak' on the short-lived label, Katasonix which he ran with the late theorist, Mark Fisher. In 2002, he released an EP including Fat Larry’s Skank; and Tales from the Basside, a collaboration with Benny Ill and The Culprit.

In 2004, Kode9 appeared on the second grime compilation on Rephlex records. That same year, Kode9 founded Hyperdub records; the first release was Sine of the Dub, a collaboration between Kode9 and Daddy Gee, which was a minimal, loose cover version of Prince's "Sign "O" the Times". Kode9 treated the vocals to fit his idea of their delivery by "a man on his deathbed".

The label has become an important and influential label within the dubstep genre. In 2006, Hyperdub released Burial's self-titled debut album, which The Wire magazine named their number one album of 2006. Kode9 continued his academic career working at the University of East London as a lecturer in media production, and course tutor for a master's program in sonic culture. He left UEL in 2014 to concentrate on music and independent research.

In 2007, Kode9 performed live at the Museu de Arte Moderna do Rio de Janeiro, during Hipersônica Festival.. In December 2009, his Sonic Warfare: Sound, Affect, and the Ecology of Fear, a book exploring the uses of acoustic force and how it affects whole populations was published by MIT Press. The book also explores how sound can be deployed to set moods of dread and fear, how sound can be used as torture, as a weapon and as a threat.

== Musical style ==
He has been inspired by Simon Reynolds' notion of the "hardcore continuum" of British dance music; styles such as jungle, drum and bass and 2-step garage and more recently Chicago footwork.

== Discography ==
=== Studio albums ===
- Memories of the Future with the Spaceape (Hyperdub, 2006)
- Black Sun with the Spaceape (Hyperdub, 2011)
- Nothing (Hyperdub, 2015)
- Astro-Darien (Hyperdub, 2022)
- Escapology (Hyperdub, 2023)

=== DJ mixes ===
- DJ Kicks (Hyperdub, 2010)
- Rinse:22 (Rinse, 2013)
- Fabriclive 100 with Burial (Fabric London, 2018)

== See also ==
- Hyperdub
