= DJ Spooky =

American DJ and music producer

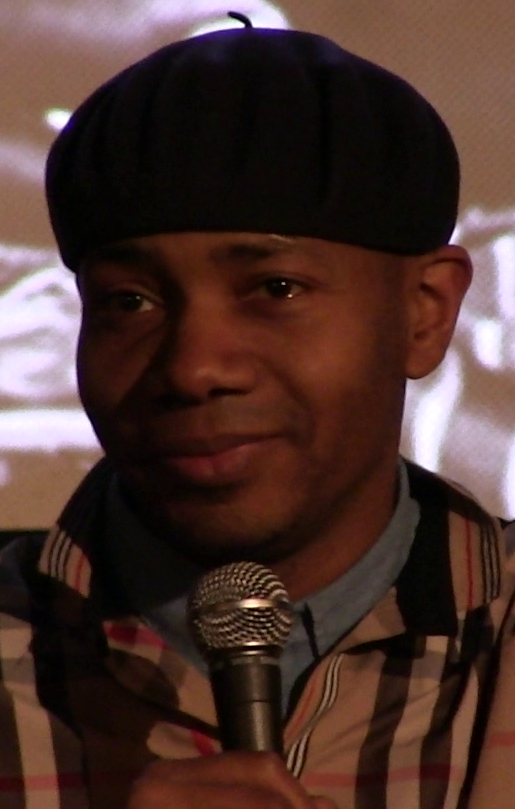
- DJ Spooky at Tribeca Cinemas celebrating Melvin Van Peebles in 2015

Background information
- Born: Paul Dennis Miller; September 6, 1970 (age 56); Washington, D.C., United States
- Genres: Electronic; hip-hop; illbient; trip hop
- Occupations: Disc jockey, record producer
- Years active: 1996–present
- Labels: Asphodel, Thirsty Ear, Universal Music Group, Synchronic
- Website: djspooky.com

Paul Dennis Miller (born September 6, 1970), known professionally as DJ Spooky, That Subliminal Kid, is an American electronic and experimental hip-hopian whose work is often called by critics "illbient" or "trip hop". He is a turntablist, record producer, philosopher, and author. He borrowed his stage name from the character The Subliminal Kid in the novel Nova Express by William S. Burroughs. Having studied philosophy and French literature at Bowdoin College, he has become a professor of Music Mediated Art at the European Graduate School and is the executive editor of Origin magazine.

== Career ==
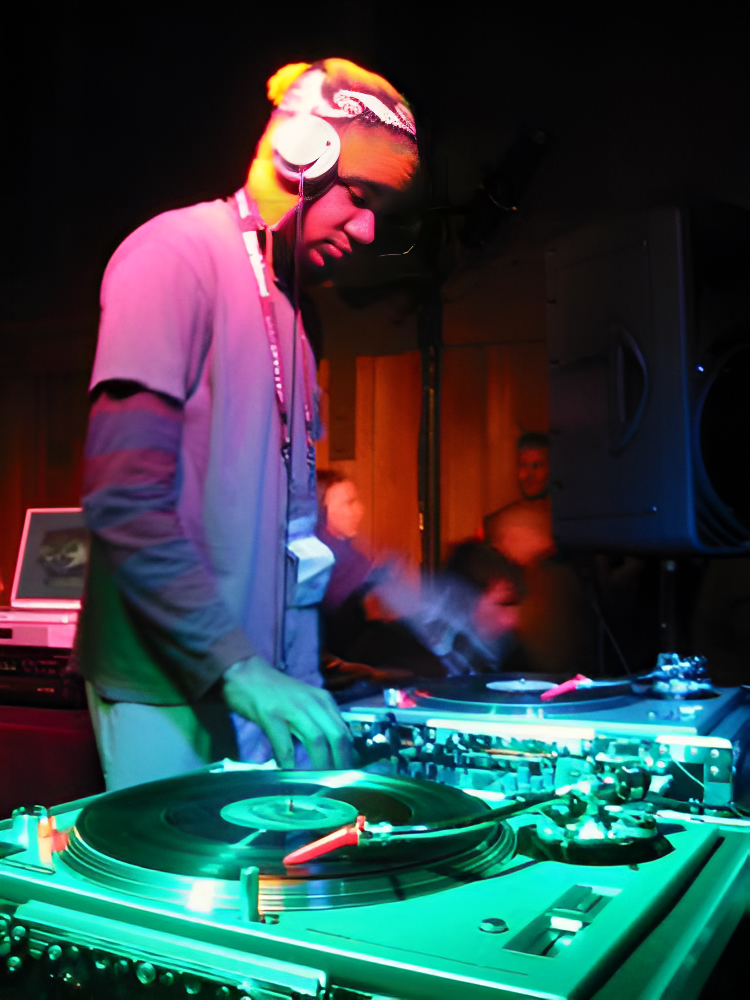
DJ Spooky at the 2003 Sundance Film Festival

Spooky began writing science fiction and formed a collective called Soundlab with several other artists.

In the mid-1990s, Spooky began recording a series of singles and EPs. His debut LP was Songs of a Dead Dreamer. Spooky contributed to the AIDS benefit albums Offbeat: A Red Hot Soundtrip (1996) and Onda Sonora: Red Hot + Lisbon (1998) produced by the Red Hot Organization. Riddim Warfare included collaborations with Kool Keith and other figures in indie rock, including Sonic Youth's Kim Gordon and Thurston Moore. In 2001, he released the CD Under the Influence.

He returned in 2002 with Modern Mantra. That same year saw the release of Optometry, a collaboration with avant-jazz players Matthew Shipp, William Parker, Guillermo E. Brown and Joe McPhee. In a classical vein, he collaborated with the ST-X Ensemble in performances of the music of Iannis Xenakis.

DJ Spooky collaborated with Ryuichi Sakamoto on projects including The Discord Symphony. The concert and album were released as an enhanced CD containing both a full audio program and multimedia computer files. It features spoken-word performances by Laurie Anderson, David Byrne, Patti Smith, David Sylvian, DJ Spooky, David Torn, and Bernardo Bertolucci.

He collaborated with Iannis Xenakis on the recording of Kraanerg, with the STX-Ensemble in 1997.

2005 saw the release of Drums of Death, DJ Spooky's CD based on sessions he recorded with Dave Lombardo of Slayer. Other guest artists include Chuck D of Public Enemy and Vernon Reid of Living Colour. The record was co-produced by Jack Dangers of Meat Beat Manifesto.

DJ Spooky joined the ninth and eleventh annual Independent Music Awards judging panel to assist independent musicians' careers. He was also a judge for the third Independent Music Awards.

DJ Spooky has said that much of his work "deals with the notion of the encoded gesture or the encrypted psychology of how music affects the whole framework of what the essence of 'humaness' [sic] is... To me at this point in the 21st century, the notion of the encoded sound is far more of a dynamic thing, especially when you have these kinds of infodispersion systems running, so I'm fascinated with the unconscious at this point."

=== Other work ===
DJ Spooky presents Vertov Enthusiasm- Sinfonia Donbassa (beta)

His work as an artist has appeared in a variety of contexts such as the Whitney Biennial; the Venice Biennale; the Museum Ludwig in Cologne, Germany; Kunsthalle, Vienna; The Andy Warhol Museum; Paula Cooper Gallery; the Museum of Contemporary Art, Chicago, and many other museums and galleries. In 2007, his work appeared in the Africa Pavilion at the 52nd Venice Biennial. This remix of music from Africa was also distributed freely online, and promoted by the blog Boing Boing. "You give away a certain amount of your stuff, and then the cultural economy of cool kicks in", DJ Spooky said.

In 2006, the song "Battle of Erishkigal", co-written by DJ Spooky and Frank Fitzpatrick, was featured in the anime-inspired film The Rebel Angel. In August 2009, DJ Spooky visited the Republic of Nauru in the Micronesian South Pacific to do research and gather material for a project in development, with a working title of The Nauru Elegies: A Portrait in Sound and Hypsographic Architecture.

DJ Spooky's multimedia performance piece Terra Nova: Sinfonia Antarctica was commissioned by BAM for the 2009 Next Wave Festival; the Hopkins Center for the Arts/Dartmouth College; UCSB Arts & Lectures; Melbourne International Arts Festival; and the Festival dei 2 Mondi in Spoleto, Italy.

DJ Spooky's Rebirth of a Nation, a remix of D. W. Griffith's 1915 film The Birth of a Nation, was commissioned in 2004 by the Lincoln Center Festival, Spoleto Festival USA, Wiener Festwochen, and the Festival d'Automne a Paris.

In 2010, Miller formed The Vanuatu Pacifica Foundation, a contemporary arts organization dedicated to exploring dialog between Oceania and the rest of the world.

In 2011, Miller collaborated with Ballet Austin Artistic Director Stephen Mills on a ballet work titled Echo Boom as part of The Mozart Project.

In 2016, DJ Spooky composed a New Forms duet for carillon and a computational re-synthesis of the Tsar Bell, a Russian bell which broke before it was ever rung.

In 2017, Miller created a score for Body and Soul, the groundbreaking 1925 silent film starring Paul Robeson in his motion picture debut.

In 2017, DJ Spooky started composing the music for Intercepted, a podcast produced by news publication The Intercept.

== Personal Life ==
Miller was born in Washington, D.C. His father, Paul E. Miller, led a panel of 12 African American law professors who assisted Angela Davis's defense lawyers during her California trial. His mother Rosemary Reed Miller was an historian and owned the Washington, D.C., boutique Toast and Strawberries.

DJ Spooky has a daughter with Fumika Yamamoto, born in 2011.

== See also ==
- List of ambient music artists
