= Illbient =

Music genre

- Stylistic origins: Ambient music; downtempo; trip hop; East Coast hip hop; dub music; jungle; post-industrial; avant-garde
- Cultural origins: Early 1990s, New York City

Other topics
- Nu jazz; IDM; psybient; hauntology; dark ambient; dubstep

Illbient is a genre of electronic music and an art movement that originated among hip hop-influenced experimental musicians from New York City in the early 1990s. The word "illbient" combines the hip hop slang term "ill" with "ambient"; DJ Olive and DJ Spooky, pioneers of the genre, have claimed to have coined the term.

Though there are many individualistic variants of illbient, the music is characterized by dub- and industrial-influenced layering of beats and soundscapes, hip hop-influenced use of breaks and samples, and a progressive approach to beat programming that encompasses many forms of world music and electronic music.

Besides DJ Olive and DJ Spooky, other notable names and acts that were part of the original illbient scene included Raz Mesinai, We™, Byzar, Spectre and the artists that were released on his WordSound label around that time. Subsequent illbient artists have included Techno Animal, Sixtoo and Odd Nosdam.

== See also ==
- Soundlab
